= 2013–14 Southeastern Conference men's basketball season =

2013–14 SEC Men's Basketball Season
- League: NCAA Division I
- Sport: Basketball
- Teams: 14
- TV partner(s): CBS, ESPN, SEC Network

Regular Season
- 2014 SEC Champions: Florida
- Season MVP: Scottie Wilbekin, Florida
- Top scorer: Jabari Brown, Missouri

Tournament
- Venue: Georgia Dome, Atlanta, Georgia
- Champions: Florida
- Runners-up: Kentucky
- Finals MVP: Scottie Wilbekin, Florida

Basketball seasons
- ← 2012–13 2014–15 →

2013–14 Southeastern Conference men's basketball standings
	Conf.				Overall
Team	W		L	PCT	W		L	PCT
No. 1 Florida †	18	–	0	1.000	36	–	3	.923
Kentucky	12	–	6	.667	29	–	11	.725
Georgia	12	–	6	.667	20	–	14	.588
Tennessee	11	–	7	.611	24	–	13	.649
Arkansas	10	–	8	.556	22	–	12	.647
Missouri	9	–	9	.500	23	–	12	.657
LSU	9	–	9	.500	20	–	14	.588
Ole Miss	9	–	9	.500	19	–	14	.576
Texas A&M	8	–	10	.444	18	–	16	.529
Vanderbilt	7	–	11	.389	15	–	16	.484
Alabama	7	–	11	.389	13	–	19	.406
Auburn	6	–	12	.333	14	–	16	.467
South Carolina	5	–	13	.278	14	–	20	.412
Mississippi State	3	–	15	.167	14	–	19	.424
† 2014 SEC tournament winner Rankings from AP poll

The 2013–14 SEC men's basketball season began with practices in October 2013, followed by the start of the 2013–14 NCAA Division I men's basketball season in November. Conference play started in early January 2014 and concluded in March, followed by the 2014 SEC men's basketball tournament at the Georgia Dome in Atlanta.

== Pre-season ==
	Media
1.	Kentucky (21)
2.	Florida (5)
3.	Tennessee (1)
4.	LSU
5.	Missouri
6.	Alabama
7.	Ole Miss
8.	Arkansas
9.	Texas A&M
10.	Vanderbilt
11.	Georgia
12.	South Carolina
13.	Mississippi State
14.	Auburn

() first place votes

=== Pre-season All-SEC teams ===
Media
Marshall Henderson OLE MISS
Jordan McRae TENNESSEE
Johnny O'Bryant IIILSU
**Julius Randle KENTUCKY**
Trevor Releford ALABAMA

- Coaches select 8 players
- Players in bold are choices for SEC Player of the Year

== Rankings ==
Legend
Increase in ranking
Decrease in ranking
Not ranked previous week

		Pre	Wk 2	Wk 3	Wk 4	Wk 5	Wk 6	Wk 7	Wk 8	Wk 9	Wk 10	Wk 11	Wk 12	Wk 13	Wk 14	Wk 15	Wk 16	Wk 17	Wk 18	Wk 19	Final
Alabama	AP																				
Alabama	C																				
Arkansas	AP										RV	RV									
Arkansas	C																				
Auburn	AP																				
Auburn	C																				
Florida	AP	10	11	16	15	15	19	16	13	12	10	7	6	3	3	3	2	1	1	1	
Florida	C	8	10	14	13	12	19	17	14	13	11	7	6	4	4	4	2	1	1	1	3
Georgia	AP																				
Georgia	C																				
Kentucky	AP	1	1	4	3	3	11	19	18	15	14	13	14	11	18	14	18	17	25	RV	
Kentucky	C	1	1	5	4	4	10	21	18	16	16	13	14	11	14	13	16	15	24	RV	2
LSU	AP	RV	RV						RV	RV					RV						
LSU	C	RV	RV																		
Mississippi State	AP																				
Mississippi State	C																				
Missouri	AP	RV	RV	RV	RV	RV	24	23	25	25	21	RV	RV								
Missouri	C	RV	RV	RV	RV	RV	RV	25	25	25	21	RV	RV								
Ole Miss	AP					RV															
Ole Miss	C																				
South Carolina	AP																				
South Carolina	C																				
Tennessee	AP	RV	RV	RV	RV										RV					RV	
Tennessee	C	RV	RV	RV	RV																23
Texas A&M	AP																				
Texas A&M	C																				
Vanderbilt	AP																				
Vanderbilt	C																				

== Regular season ==
=== Conference matrix ===
This table summarizes the head-to-head results between teams in conference play. (x) indicates games remaining this season.

	Alabama	Arkansas	Auburn	Florida	Georgia	Kentucky	LSU	Mississippi State	Missouri	Ole Miss	South Carolina	Tennessee	Texas A&M	Vanderbilt
vs. Alabama	–	1–1	1–1	2–0	1–0	1–0	0–1	0–1	1–1	1–1	1–0	1–0	1–0	0–1
vs. Arkansas	1–1	–	0–1	1–0	1–1	0–2	1–1	0–1	2–0	0–1	0–1	1–0	1–0	0–1
vs. Auburn	1–1	1–0	–	2–0	0–1	1–0	1–0	1–1	1–0	1–0	0–2	1–0	0–1	1–0
vs. Florida	0–2	0–1	0–2	–	0–1	0–2	0–1	0–1	0–1	0–1	0–2	0–2	0–1	0–2
vs. Georgia	0–1	1–1	1–0	1–0	–	1–0	0–2	0–1	0–2	0–1	0–2	1–0	0–1	1–0
vs. Kentucky	0–1	2–0	0–1	2–0	0–1	–	1–1	0–2	0–1	0–2	1–0	0–1	0–1	0–1
vs. LSU	1–0	1–1	0–1	1–0	2–0	1–1	–	0–1	0–1	1–0	0–1	1–0	1–1	0–2
vs. Mississippi State	1–0	1–0	1–1	1–0	1–0	2–0	1–0	–	1–0	1–1	1–0	1–0	1–1	1–0
vs. Missouri	1–1	0–2	0–1	1–0	2–0	1–0	1–0	0–1	–	1–0	0–1	1–1	0–0	0–1
vs. Ole Miss	1–1	1–0	0–1	1–0	1–0	2–0	0–1	1–1	0–1	–	0–2	1–0	1–0	0–2
vs. South Carolina	0–1	1–0	2–0	2–0	2–0	0–1	1–0	1–0	1–0	2–0	–	1–0	1–1	0–1
vs. Tennessee	0–1	0–1	0–1	2–0	0–1	1–0	0–1	0–1	1–1	0–1	0–1	–	2–0	1–1
vs. Texas A&M	0–1	0–1	1–0	1–0	1–0	1–0	1–1	1–1	0–0	0–1	1–1	0–2	–	2–0
vs. Vanderbilt	1–0	1–0	0–1	1–0	0–1	1–0	2–0	1–1	1–0	2–0	1–0	1–1	0–2	–
Total	7–11	10–8	6–12	18–0	12–6	12–6	9–9	3–15	9–9	9–9	5–13	11–7	8–10	7–11

== Postseason ==
=== SEC tournament ===
- March 12–16, 2014 Southeastern Conference Basketball Tournament, Georgia Dome, Atlanta.

**2014 SEC men's basketball tournament seeds and results**
Seed	School	Conf.	Over.	Tiebreaker	First Round March 13	Second Round March 14	Quarterfinals March 15	Semifinals March 16	Championship March 17
1.	‡**Florida**	18–0	32–2		BYE	BYE	vs. #8 Missouri **W, 72–49**	vs. #4 Tennessee **W, 56–49**	vs. #2 Kentucky **W, 61–60**
2.	†**Kentucky**	12–6	24–10	1–0 vs. UGA	BYE	BYE	vs. #7 LSU – **W 85–67**	vs. #3 Georgia – **W 70–58**	vs. #1 Florida – **L 60–61**
3.	†**Georgia**	12–6	19–13	0–1 vs. UK	BYE	BYE	vs. #6 Ole Miss – **W, 75–73**	vs. #2 Kentucky – **L, 58–70**	
4.	†**Tennessee**	11–7	21–12		BYE	BYE	vs. #13 South Carolina – **W, 59–44**	vs. #1 Florida – **L, 49–56**	
5.	#**Arkansas**	10–8	21–11		BYE	vs. #13 South Carolina – **L, 69–71**			
6.	#**Ole Miss**	9–9	19–14	2–0 vs. LSU & MU	BYE	vs. #14 Mississippi State – **W, 78-66**	vs. #3 Georgia – **L, 73-75**		
7.	#**LSU**	9–9	19–13	1–1 vs. UM and MU	BYE	vs. #10 Alabama – **W, 68-56**	vs. #2 Kentucky – **L, 67-85**		
8.	#**Missouri**	9–9	22–11	0–2 vs. UM and LSU	BYE	vs. #9 Texas A&M – **W, 91-83^{2OT}**	vs. #1 Florida – **L, 49–72**		
9.	#**Texas A&M**	8–10	17–15		BYE	vs. #8 Missouri – **L, 83-91^{2OT}**			
10.	#**Alabama**	7–11	13–19	1–0 vs. Vanderbilt	BYE	vs. #7 LSU – **L, 83-68**			
11.	**Vanderbilt**	7–11	15–16	0–1 vs. Alabama	vs. #14 Mississippi State – **L, 68–82**				
12.	**Auburn**	6–12	14–16		vs. #13 South Carolina – **L, 56–74**				
13.	**South Carolina**	5–13	13–21		vs. #12 Auburn – **W, 74–56**	vs. #5 Arkansas – **W, 71–69**	vs. #4 Tennessee– **L, 44–59**		
14.	**Mississippi State**	3–15	14–19		vs. #11 Vanderbilt – **W, 82–68**	vs. #6 Ole Miss – **L, 66–78**			
‡ – SEC regular season champions, and tournament No. 1 seed. † – Received a double-bye in the conference tournament. # – Received a single-bye in the conference tournament. Overall records include all games played in the SEC tournament.

=== NCAA tournament ===
Seed	Region	School	First Four	Second Round	Third Round	Sweet 16	Elite Eight	Final Four	Championship
1	South	**Florida**		**W, 67–55** vs. #16 Albany – (Orlando, Florida)	**W, 61–45** vs. #8 Pittsburgh – (Orlando, Florida)	**W, 79–68** vs. #4 UCLA – (Memphis, Tennessee)	**W, 62–52** vs. #11 Dayton – (Memphis, Tennessee)	**L, 53–63** vs. #7 Connecticut – (Arlington, Texas)	
8	Midwest	**Kentucky**		**W, 56–49** vs. #9 Kansas State – (St. Louis, Missouri)	**W, 78–76** vs. #1 Wichita State – (St. Louis, Missouri)	**W, 74–69** vs. #4 Louisville – (Indianapolis, Indiana)	**W, 78–75** vs. #2 Michigan – (Indianapolis, Indiana)	**W, 74–73** vs. #2 Wisconsin – (Arlington, Texas)	**L, 54-60** vs. #7 Connecticut – (Arlington, Texas]
11	Midwest	**Tennessee**	**W, 78–65** vs. #11 Iowa – (Dayton, Ohio)	**W, 86–67** vs. #6 Massachusetts – (Raleigh, North Carolina)	**W, 83–63** vs. #14 Mercer – (Raleigh, North Carolina)	**L, 73–75** vs. #2 Michigan – (Indianapolis, Indiana)			

=== National Invitation tournament ===
Seed	Region	School	First Round	Second Round	Quarterfinals	Semifinals	Finals
2	Florida State Bracket	**Georgia**	**W, 63–56** vs. #7 Vermont – (Athens, Georgia)	**L, 79–71** vs. #3 Louisiana Tech – (Athens, Georgia)			
2	Minnesota Bracket	**Missouri**	**W, 85–77** vs. #7 Davidson – (Columbia, Missouri)	**L, 71–64** vs. #3 Southern Miss – (Columbia, Missouri)			
3	SMU Bracket	**Arkansas**	**W, 91–71** vs. #6 Indiana State – (Fayetteville, Arkansas)	**L, 75–64** vs. #2 California – (Berkeley, California)			
5	SMU Bracket	**LSU**	**W, 71–63** vs. #5 San Francisco – (San Francisco, California)	**L, 75–64** vs. #1 SMU – (University Park, Texas)			

=== College Basketball Invitational ===
School	First Round	Quarterfinals	Semifinals	Finals
**Texas A&M**	**W, 59–43** vs. Wyoming – (College Station, Texas)	**L, 62–55** vs. Illinois State – (Normal, Illinois)		

=== NBA draft ===
Round	Pick	Player	Position	Nationality	Team	School/club team
1	7	Julius Randle	PF	United States	Los Angeles Lakers	Kentucky (Fr.)
1	17	James Young	SG/SF	United States	Boston Celtics (from Brooklyn)	Kentucky (Fr.)
2	35	Jarnell Stokes	PF	United States	Utah Jazz (traded to Memphis)	Tennessee (Jr.)
2	36	Johnny O'Bryant III	PF	United States	Milwaukee Bucks (from L.A. Lakers via Phoenix and Minnesota)	LSU (Jr.)
2	46	Jordan Clarkson	PG	United States	Washington Wizards (traded to L.A. Lakers)	Missouri (Jr.)
2	58	Jordan McRae	SG	United States	San Antonio Spurs (from L.A. Clippers via New Orleans, traded to Philadelphia)	Tennessee (Sr.)

== Honors and awards ==
=== All-SEC awards and teams ===
==== Coaches ====
**2014 SEC Men's Basketball Individual Awards**
Award	Recipient(s)
Player of the Year	**Scottie Wilbekin**, G, FLORIDA
Coach of the Year	**Billy Donovan**, FLORIDA
Defensive Player of the Year	**Patric Young**, F, FLORIDA
Freshman of the Year	**Julius Randle**, F, KENTUCKY
Scholar-Athlete of the Year	**Patric Young**, F, FLORIDA
Sixth Man Award	**Dorian Finney-Smith**, F, FLORIDA

**2014 SEC Men's Basketball All-Conference Teams**
First Team	Second Team	All-Freshman Team	All-Defensive Team
Jabari Brown Jr., G, MISSOURI; Jordan McRae Sr., G, TENNESSEE; Johnny O'Bryant III Sr., F, LSU; Casey Prather Sr., F, FLORIDA; Julius Randle Fr., F, KENTUCKY; Trevor Releford Sr., G, ALABAMA; Jarnell Stokes Jr., F, TENNESSEE; Scottie Wilbekin Sr., G, FLORIDA	Jordan Clarkson Jr., G, MISSOURI; Chris Denson Sr., G, AUBURN; Marshall Henderson Sr., G, OLE MISS; Charles Mann So., G, GEORGIA; Jordan Mickey Fr., F, LSU; Rod Odom Sr., F, VANDERBILT; Bobby Portis Fr., F, ARKANSAS; Jarvis Summers Jr., G, OLE MISS; James Young Fr., G, KENTUCKY; Patric Young Sr., F, FLORIDA	Shannon Hale Fr., F, ALABAMA; Damian Jones Fr., C, VANDERBILT; Jarell Martin Fr., F, LSU; Jordan Mickey Fr., F, LSU; Bobby Portis Fr., F, ARKANSAS; Julius Randle Fr., F, KENTUCKY; Sindarius Thornwell Fr., G, SOUTH CAROLINA; James Young Fr., G, KENTUCKY	Willie Cauley-Stein So., C, KENTUCKY; Jordan Mickey Fr., F, LSU; Josh Richardson Jr., G, TENNESSEE; Scottie Wilbekin Sr., G, FLORIDA; Patric Young Sr., F, FLORIDA
† - denotes unanimous selection

==== Associated Press ====
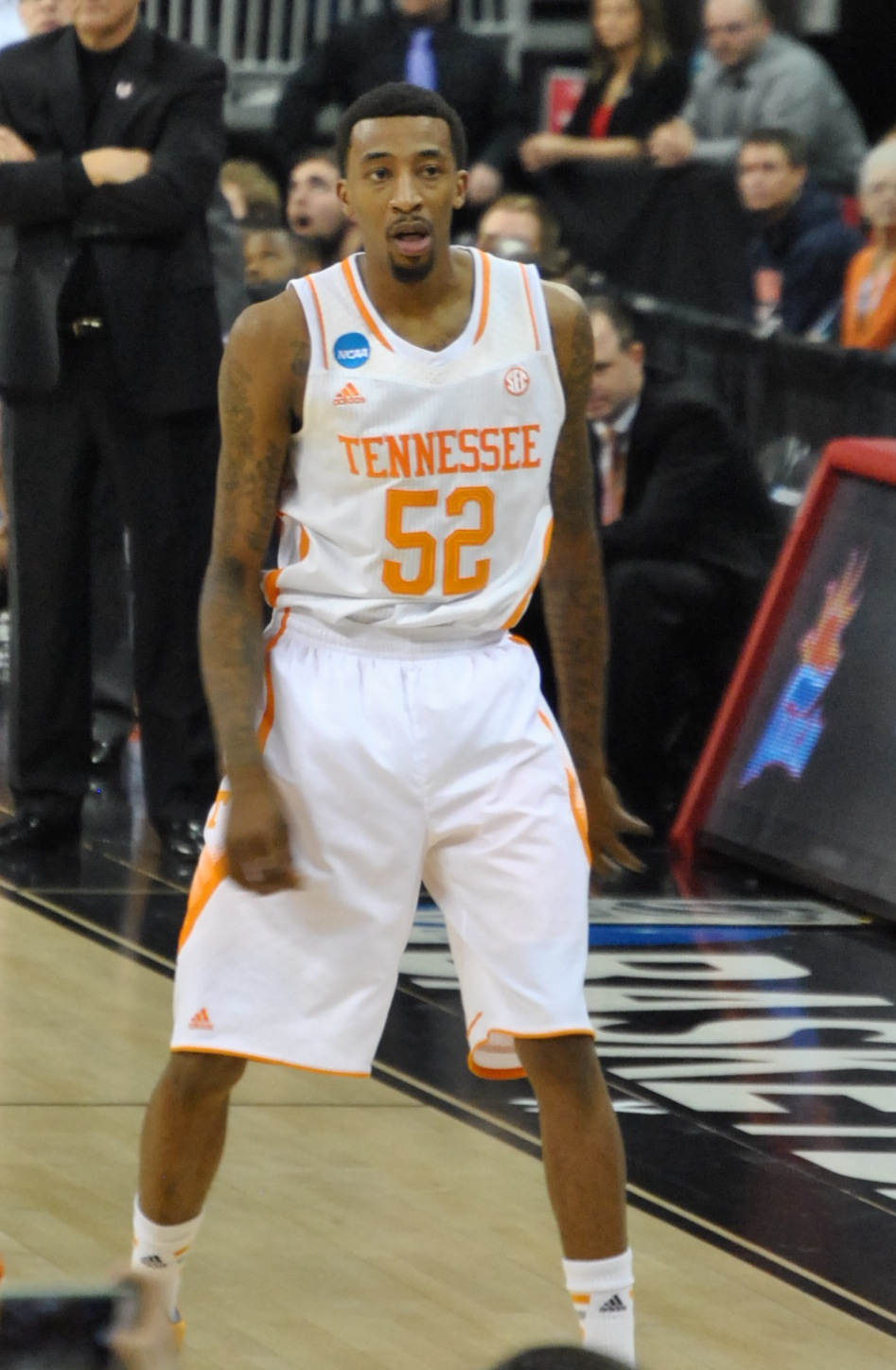
Jordan McRae

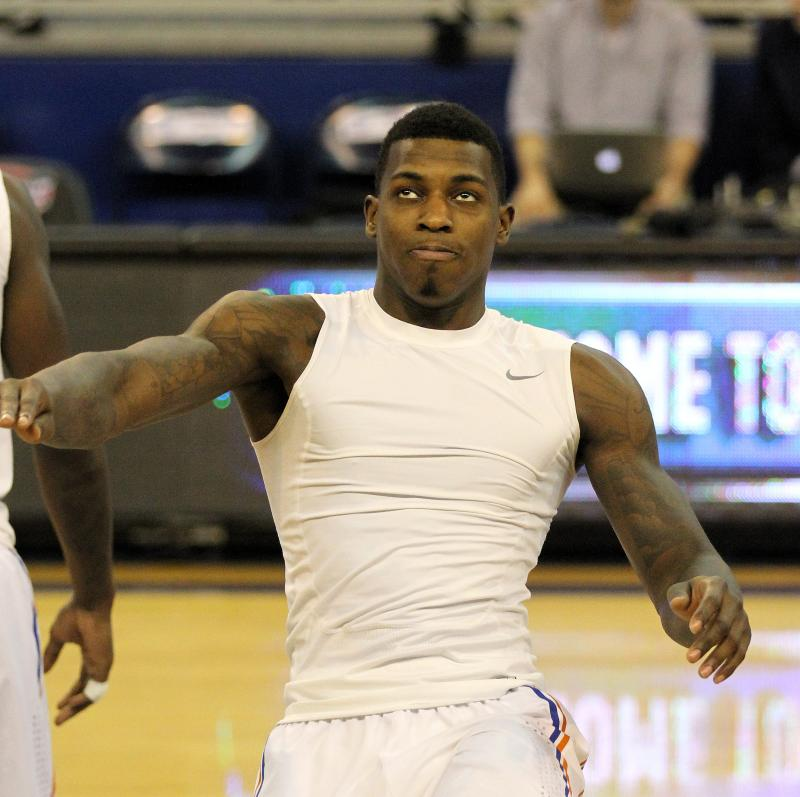
Casey Prather

**2014 SEC Men's Basketball Individual Awards**
Award	Recipient(s)
Player of the Year	**Scottie Wilbekin**, G, FLORIDA
Coach of the Year	**Billy Donovan**, FLORIDA
Newcomer of the Year	**Julius Randle**, F, KENTUCKY

**2014 SEC Men's Basketball All-Conference Teams**
First Team	Second Team
Jabari Brown Jr., G, MISSOURI; Casey Prather Sr., F, FLORIDA; Julius Randle† Fr., F, KENTUCKY; Jarnell Stokes Jr., F, TENNESSEE; Scottie Wilbekin† Sr., G, FLORIDA	Jordan McRae Sr., G, TENNESSEE; Jordan Mickey Fr., F, LSU; Johnny O'Bryant III Jr., F, LSU; Trevor Releford Sr., G, ALABAMA; Patric Young Sr., C, FLORIDA
† - denotes unanimous selection
