= 2013–14 Tennessee Volunteers basketball team =

American college basketball season

2013–14 Tennessee Volunteers basketball

NCAA tournament, Sweet Sixteen
- Conference: Southeastern Conference

Ranking
- Coaches: No. 23
- Record: 24–13 (11–7 SEC)
- Head coach: Cuonzo Martin (3rd season)
- Assistant coaches: Tracy Webster; Jon Harris; Kent Williams
- Home arena: Thompson–Boling Arena

2013–14 Southeastern Conference men's basketball standings
	Conf.				Overall
Team	W		L	PCT	W		L	PCT
No. 1 Florida †	18	–	0	1.000	36	–	3	.923
Kentucky	12	–	6	.667	29	–	11	.725
Georgia	12	–	6	.667	20	–	14	.588
Tennessee	11	–	7	.611	24	–	13	.649
Arkansas	10	–	8	.556	22	–	12	.647
Missouri	9	–	9	.500	23	–	12	.657
LSU	9	–	9	.500	20	–	14	.588
Ole Miss	9	–	9	.500	19	–	14	.576
Texas A&M	8	–	10	.444	18	–	16	.529
Vanderbilt	7	–	11	.389	15	–	16	.484
Alabama	7	–	11	.389	13	–	19	.406
Auburn	6	–	12	.333	14	–	16	.467
South Carolina	5	–	13	.278	14	–	20	.412
Mississippi State	3	–	15	.167	14	–	19	.424
† 2014 SEC tournament winner Rankings from AP poll

The 2013–14 Tennessee Volunteers basketball team represented the University of Tennessee in the 2013–14 NCAA Division I men's basketball season. The team's head coach was Cuonzo Martin, who was in his third season at Tennessee. The team played their home games at the Thompson–Boling Arena in Knoxville, Tennessee as a member of the Southeastern Conference.

== Previous season ==
The Vols posted a record of 20–13 (11–7 SEC) in the 2012–13 season and finished sixth in the SEC standings in Cuonzo Martin's second season as head coach. The season was highlighted by a 30-point victory over rival Kentucky and a victory over a team that competed in the Final Four, Wichita State. The Volunteers lost in the first round of the 2013 NIT to Mercer.

== Season summary ==
Going into the season, Cuonzo Martin faced pressure and unrest from the Tennessee fanbase, restless after having missed the NCAA Tournament two consecutive seasons. During the 2011–12 and 2012–13 seasons, promising finishes to the regular season were undermined by early season losses to inferior out of conference opponents; bewildering losses to College of Charleston, Oakland and Austin Peay scuttled any hopes of a tournament appearance each of those seasons, respectively. Frustrations grew shortly after Tennessee inexplicably dropped a game to a sub-100 RPI UTEP squad during the Battle for Atlantis tournament in November. A bubble team throughout the season, Tennessee ultimately nabbed a bid to the NCAA Tournament (despite the earlier loss to UTEP and suffering a sweep at the hands of a sub-100 RPI Texas A&M). In any case, Martin rallied the team to a 4–0 finish to end the regular season at 20–11. A victory over a moribund South Carolina outfit and a third straight loss to #1 Florida put Tennessee at 21–12. This was enough to earn Tennessee an at-large bid to the NCAA Tournament, Martin's first and only appearance with Tennessee. The Vols were placed in the First Four as an 11 seed, where Tennessee beat Iowa in overtime to move on to the field of 64. Tennessee routed Umass in the second round and Mercer in the round of 32. As a result, Tennessee earned a trip to the Sweet 16 for the first time since 2010. The Vols faced Michigan and came within one basket of making what would have been only their second Elite 8 appearance but fell to the Wolverines, 73–71, thanks to a controversial charge called on Jarnell Stokes.

Despite the late season surge and performance in the tourney (the latter accomplishment arguably the fruit of a favorable tournament draw, and a Mercer upset of Duke), Cuonzo Martin would leave Tennessee at season's end to take the head coaching job at the University of California-Berkeley.

== Roster ==
2013–14 Tennessee Volunteers men's basketball team
Players
Coaches

Pos.	#	Name	Height	Weight	Year	Hometown
G	1	Josh Richardson	6 ft 6 in (1.98 m)	190 lb (86 kg)	Jr	Edmond, Oklahoma
G	2	Antonio Barton	6 ft 1 in (1.85 m)	172 lb (78 kg)	Sr	Baltimore, Maryland
G	3	Robert Hubbs III	6 ft 6 in (1.98 m)	195 lb (88 kg)	Fr	Newbern, Tennessee
G	4	Armani Moore	6 ft 5 in (1.96 m)	203 lb (92 kg)	So	Kennesaw, Georgia
F	5	Jarnell Stokes	6 ft 8 in (2.03 m)	250 lb (113 kg)	Jr	Memphis, Tennessee
C	10	Rawane Ndiaye	6 ft 10 in (2.08 m)	280 lb (127 kg)	Jr	Raleigh, North Carolina
G	15	Darius Thompson	6 ft 5 in (1.96 m)	181 lb (82 kg)	Fr	Murfreesboro, Tennessee
F	21	A. J. Davis	6 ft 9 in (2.06 m)	208 lb (94 kg)	RS Fr	Buford, Georgia
G	23	Derek Reese	6 ft 8 in (2.03 m)	215 lb (98 kg)	So	Orlando, Florida
G	24	Brandon Lopez	6 ft 1 in (1.85 m)	179 lb (81 kg)	Jr	Knoxville, Tennessee
G	25	Galen Campbell	6 ft 2 in (1.88 m)	200 lb (91 kg)	So	Knoxville, Tennessee
G	31	Quinton Chievous	6 ft 6 in (1.98 m)	214 lb (97 kg)	RS So	Chicago
G	32	D'Montre Edwards	6 ft 6 in (1.98 m)	203 lb (92 kg)	Sr	Charleston, South Carolina
F	34	Jeronne Maymon	6 ft 8 in (2.03 m)	260 lb (118 kg)	RS Sr	Madison, Wisconsin
G	52	Jordan McRae	6 ft 6 in (1.98 m)	185 lb (84 kg)	Sr	Midway, Georgia

Head coach

- Cuonzo Martin (Purdue)

Assistant coach(es)

- Tracy Webster (Wisconsin)
- Jon Harris (Marquette)
- Kent Williams (Southern Illinois)

Legend

- (C) Team captain
- (S) Suspended
- (I) Ineligible
- (W) Walk-on
- Injured
- Current redshirt

Roster
Last update: 2012-09-24

== Schedule and results ==
Date time, TV	Rank^{#}	Opponent^{#}	Result	Record	High points	High rebounds	High assists	Site (attendance) city, state
Non-conference regular season
November 12, 2013*; 9:00 pm, FS1		at Xavier	L 63–67	0–1	23 – McRae	10 – Maymon	5 – McRae	Cintas Center (9,878); Cincinnati
November 16, 2013*; 7:00 pm, SPSO		USC Upstate	W 74–65	1–1	18 – McRae	18 – Stokes	3 – McRae	Thompson–Boling Arena (15,119); Knoxville, Tennessee
November 18, 2013*; 7:00 pm, FSN		The Citadel	W 86–60	2–1	20 – McCrae	7 – Moore	3 – Richardson	Thompson–Boling Arena (13,394); Knoxville, Tennessee
November 22, 2013*; 7:00 pm, FSN		Tennessee State	W 88–67	3–1	25 – McRae	8 – Stokes	7 – Thompson	Thompson–Boling Arena (15,134); Knoxville, Tennessee
November 28, 2013*; 9:30 pm, NBCSN		vs. UTEP; Battle 4 Atlantis Quarterfinals	L 70–78	3–2	22 – McRae	14 – Stokes	3 – Richardson	Sports and Fitness Center (1,416); Nassau, Bahamas
November 29, 2013*; 1:00 pm, AXS TV		vs. Xavier; Battle 4 Atlantis Consolation 2nd Round	W 64–49	4–2	20 – Stokes	10 – Stokes	3 – Stokes	Sports and Fitness Center (1,573); Nassau, Bahamas
November 30, 2013*; 3:30 pm, AXS TV		vs. Wake Forest; Battle 4 Atlantis 5th place game	W 82–63	5–2	21 – Stokes	10 – Stokes	3 – Tied	Sports and Fitness Center (1,400); Nassau, Bahamas
December 7, 2013*; 12:00 pm, FSN		Tennessee Tech	W 84–63	6–2	19 – Stokes	13 – Stokes	4 – McRae	Thompson–Boling Arena (13,606); Knoxville, Tennessee
December 14, 2013*; 2:00 pm, ESPN2		at No. 12 Wichita State	L 61–70	6–3	26 – McRae	9 – Maymon	4 – Barton	Charles Koch Arena (14,356); Wichita, Kansas
December 18, 2013*; 7:00 pm, ESPNU		NC State	L 58–65	6–4	21 – McRae	16 – Maymon	3 – Thompson	Thompson–Boling Arena (14,831); Knoxville, Tennessee
December 23, 2013*; 7:00 pm, ESPNU		Morehead State	W 82–67	7–4	19 – Richardson	10 – Reese	5 – McRae	Thompson–Boling Arena (15,207); Knoxville, Tennessee
December 30, 2013*; 7:00 pm, ESPN2		Virginia	W 87–52	8–4	21 – McRae	9 – Reese	5 – McRae	Thompson–Boling Arena (16,142); Knoxville, Tennessee
January 4, 2014*; 2:00 pm		Tusculum	W 98–51	9–4	19 – McRae	8 – Stokes	9 – Thompson	Thompson–Boling Arena (14,175); Knoxville, Tennessee
SEC regular season
January 7, 2014; 7:00 pm, ESPN		at LSU	W 68–50	10–4 (1–0)	19 – McRae	15 – Stokes	5 – McRae	Maravich Center (7,918); Baton Rouge, Louisiana
January 11, 2014; 6:00 pm, ESPN3		Texas A&M	L 56–57	10–5 (1–1)	12 – Barton	15 – Maymon	4 – McRae	Thompson–Boling Arena (18,079); Knoxville, Tennessee
January 15, 2014; 7:00 pm, ESPN3		Auburn	W 78–67	11–5 (2–1)	21 – McRae	14 – Stokes	4 – 3 Tied	Thompson–Boling Arena (14,205); Knoxville, Tennessee
January 18, 2014; 12:00 pm, CBS		at No. 13 Kentucky	L 66–74	11–6 (2–2)	20 – Stokes	15 – Stokes	3 – Barton	Rupp Arena (24,246); Lexington, Kentucky
January 22, 2014; 8:00 pm, SEC TV		Arkansas	W 81–74	12–6 (3–2)	34 – McRae	9 – Maymon	4 – Barton	Thompson–Boling Arena (14,034); Knoxville, Tennessee
January 25, 2014; 4:00 pm, ESPN2		at No. 6 Florida	L 41–67	12–7 (3–3)	16 – Stokes	10 – Stokes	2 – Stokes	O'Connell Center (12,475); Gainesville, Florida
January 29, 2014; 8:00 pm, SEC TV		Ole Miss	W 86–70	13–7 (4–3)	26 – McRae	14 – Stokes	7 – Thompson	Thompson–Boling Arena (14,341); Knoxville, Tennessee
February 1, 2014; 8:00 pm, ESPN2		at Alabama	W 76–59	14–7 (5–3)	26 – McRae	16 – Stokes	4 – McRae	Coleman Coliseum (12,620); Tuscaloosa, Alabama
February 5, 2014; 8:00 pm, ESPN3		at Vanderbilt	L 60–64	14–8(5–4)	16 – McRae	14 – Stokes	5 – Thompson	Memorial Gymnasium (10,733); Nashville, Tennessee
February 8, 2014; 3:00 pm, ESPNU		South Carolina	W 72–53	15–8 (6–4)	24 – McRae	8 – Stokes	4 – Thompson	Thompson–Boling Arena (17,215); Knoxville, Tennessee
February 11, 2014; 7:00 pm, ESPN		No. 3 Florida	L 58–67	15–9 (6–5)	20 – Stokes	11 – Stokes	3 – Barton	Thompson–Boling Arena (18,009); Knoxville, Tennessee
February 15, 2014; 4:00 pm, ESPN2		at Missouri	L 70–75	15–10 (6–6)	31 – McRae	8 – Stokes	3 – Stokes	Mizzou Arena (14,132); Columbia, Missouri
February 18, 2014; 9:00 pm, ESPNU		Georgia	W 67–48	16–10 (7–6)	20 – Stokes	11 – Stokes	3 – Stokes	Thompson–Boling Arena (13,852); Knoxville, Tennessee
February 22, 2014; 3:00 pm, ESPNU		at Texas A&M	L 65-68 ^{OT}	16–11 (7–7)	20 – McRae	16 – Stokes	4 – Stokes	Reed Arena (6,432); College Station, Texas
February 26, 2014; 8:00 pm, SEC TV		at Mississippi State	W 75–68	17–11 (8–7)	29 – McRae	11 – Maymon	4 – McRae	Humphrey Coliseum (6,161); Starkville, Mississippi
March 1, 2014; 12:00 pm, ESPN2		Vanderbilt	W 76–38	18–11 (9–7)	21 – Barton	11 – Stokes	6 – Barton	Thompson–Boling Arena (17,208); Knoxville, Tennessee
March 5, 2014; 8:00 pm, SEC TV		at Auburn	W 82–54	19–11 (10–7)	20 – Stokes	8 – Maymon	7 – Stokes	Auburn Arena (5,304); Auburn, Alabama
March 8, 2014; 4:00 pm, ESPN		Missouri	W 72–45	20–11 (11–7)	16 – Barton	10 – Tied	4 – Tied	Thompson–Boling Arena (18,519); Knoxville, Tennessee
SEC Tournament
March 14, 2014; 3:30 pm, ESPNU		vs. South Carolina; Quarterfinals	W 59–44	21–11	22 – Stokes	15 – Stokes	3 – McRae	Georgia Dome; Atlanta, Georgia
March 15, 2014; 1:00 pm, ABC		vs. No. 1 Florida; Semifinals	L 49–56	21–12	15 – McRae	9 – Maymon	3 – Barton	Georgia Dome; Atlanta, Georgia
NCAA tournament
March 19, 2014; 9:10 pm, TruTV	No. (11 MW)	vs. (11 MW) Iowa; First Four	W 78–65 ^{OT}	22–12	20 – McRae	13 – Stokes	5 – Marble	University of Dayton Arena (11,534); Dayton, Ohio
March 21, 2014; 2:45 pm, CBS	No. (11 MW)	vs. (6 MW) Massachusetts; Second round	W 86–67	23–12	26 – Stokes	14 – Stokes	5 – Richardson	PNC Arena; Raleigh, North Carolina
March 23, 2014*; 6:10 pm, TNT	No. (11 MW)	vs. (14 MW) Mercer; Third round	W 83–63	24–12	26 – Richardson	18 – Stokes	5 – Stokes	PNC Arena; Raleigh, North Carolina
March 28, 2014*; 7:15 pm, CBS	No. (11 MW)	vs. No. 7 (2 MW) Michigan; Sweet Sixteen	L 71–73	24–13	24 – McRae	6 – 3 Tied	2 – 4 Tied	Lucas Oil Stadium; Indianapolis
*Non-conference game. ^{#}Rankings from AP Poll, For NCAA tournament, number in parentheses is seed, letter indicates region. (#) Tournament seedings in parentheses. All times are in Eastern Time.

== See also ==
- 2013–14 Tennessee Lady Volunteers basketball team
