= Big 12/SEC Challenge =

College basketball series

- Conference: Southeastern Conference; Big 12 Conference
- League: NCAA Division I
- Founded: 2013
- Folded: 2022
- Sports fielded: College basketball
- Last champion: Big 12
- Most titles: Big 12 Conference (5)
- Broadcaster: ESPN, ESPN2, ESPNU

The Big 12/SEC Challenge was an NCAA Division I men's college basketball series that took place in the middle of the season, usually late January, consisting of a series of ten games featuring members of the Big 12 Conference and Southeastern Conference.

The format was similar to the ACC–Big Ten Challenge. Each of the ten members of the Big 12 played a game against a member of the SEC. Half of the ten games were hosted by the Big 12 team and the other half were hosted by the SEC team. Because the SEC had 14 members, four teams of the SEC were excluded from the challenge each season. Effective with the 2019–20 season, the SEC teams excluded from the Big 12/SEC Challenge participated in the newly launched SEC/American Alliance against teams from the American Athletic Conference.

Previously, the Big 12 was a part of the Big 12/Pac-10 Hardwood Series from 2007 to 2010, and the SEC was a part of the SEC–Big East Challenge from 2007 to 2012. The contracts for those challenges were not renewed when they expired, leaving both conferences available to establish this challenge. (The issues faced by the Big East in the 2010–13 Big East Conference realignment was a factor in the decision not to renew its series with the SEC).

Two current SEC members, Texas A&M and Missouri, are former members of the Big 12. Missouri has a rivalry with current Big 12 member Kansas leaving the possibility of playing the rivalry game in the Big 12/SEC Challenge. The two teams had not met in the regular season since Missouri left for the SEC until December 10, 2022, when it was played outside of the Challenge.

On November 28, 2022, amid ESPN losing its media rights to the Big Ten, it was announced that the series would be discontinued after the 2022–23 season. ESPN will arrange an ACC–SEC Challenge as a replacement beginning in the 2023–24 season.

In 2024, the Coast-to-Coast Challenge succeeded the Challenge with two match-ups between the conferences.

Since 2023, the term may also refer to a 4-way football derby in the Sun Belt Conference between Kentucky and South Carolina ("SEC Derby"), and between West Virginia and Central Florida ("Big 12 Derby"). Since neither conference sponsors men's soccer, the four orphan teams belong to the Sun Belt. The four-way derby is sometimes called a "Big 12/SEC Challenge" when any of the four teams play each other, with the home conference rivalry the primary derby and the cross-conference derby the other.

== Series history ==
=== Overall record ===
Year	Winner	Overall record
2013–14	Big 12	7–3
2014–15	Big 12	6–4
2015–16	Big 12	7–3
2016–17	Tie	5–5
2017–18	SEC	6–4
2018–19	Big 12	6–4
2019–20	Tie	5–5
2020–21	SEC	5–4
2021–22	SEC	6–4
2022–23	Big 12	7–3
All years combined	Big 12	55–44

=== 2013–14 ===
Date	Time	Big 12 team	SEC team	Location	TV	Attendance	Winner	Leader	All-Time
Thurs., Nov. 14	9:00 PM	Texas Tech	Alabama	Coleman Coliseum • Tuscaloosa, AL	ESPN2	10,746	Alabama (76–64)	SEC (1–0)	SEC (1–0)
Mon., Dec. 2	7:00 PM	#17 Iowa State	Auburn	Hilton Coliseum • Ames, IA	ESPNU	13,889	Iowa State (99–70)	Tied (1–1)	Tied (1–1)
Mon., Dec. 2	9:00 PM	Texas	Vanderbilt	Frank Erwin Center • Austin, TX	ESPN2	7,431	Texas (70–64)	Big 12 (2–1)	Big 12 (2–1)
Thurs., Dec. 5	7:00 PM	TCU	Mississippi State	Humphrey Coliseum • Starkville, MS	ESPNU	6,795	TCU (71–61)	Big 12 (3–1)	Big 12 (3–1)
Thurs., Dec. 5	7:00 PM	West Virginia	Missouri	Mizzou Arena • Columbia, MO	ESPN2	7,292	Missouri (80–71)	Big 12 (3–2)	Big 12 (3–2)
Thurs., Dec. 5	9:00 PM	Kansas State	Ole Miss	Bramlage Coliseum • Manhattan, KS	ESPN2	11,990	Kansas State (61–58)	Big 12 (4–2)	Big 12 (4–2)
Fri., Dec. 6	9:30 PM	#9 Oklahoma State	South Carolina	Gallagher-Iba Arena • Stillwater, OK	ESPNU	13,611	Oklahoma State (79–52)	Big 12 (5–2)	Big 12 (5–2)
Fri., Dec. 6	10:00 PM	#20 Baylor	#3 Kentucky	AT&T Stadium • Arlington, TX	ESPN	12,818	Baylor (67–62)	Big 12 (6–2)	Big 12 (6–2)
Tues., Dec. 10	7:00 PM	#13 Kansas	#19 Florida	O'Connell Center • Gainesville, FL	ESPN	12,423	Florida (67–61)	Big 12 (6–3)	Big 12 (6–3)
Sat., Dec. 21	7:00 PM	Oklahoma	Texas A&M	Toyota Center • Houston, TX	ESPNU	N/A	Oklahoma (64–52)	Big 12 (7–3)	Big 12 (7–3)
Arkansas, Georgia, LSU and Tennessee did not participate for the SEC. All times Eastern

=== 2014–15 ===
Date	Time	Big 12 team	SEC team	Location	TV	Attendance	Winner	Leader	All-Time
Wed., Dec. 3	9:00 PM	Texas Tech	Auburn	United Supermarkets Arena • Lubbock, TX	SECN	7,040	Texas Tech (46–44)	Big 12 (1–0)	Big 12 (8-3)
Thurs., Dec. 4	7:00 PM	#16 West Virginia	LSU	WVU Coliseum • Morgantown, WV	ESPN2	10,802	LSU (74–73)	Tied (1–1)	Big 12 (8-4)
Thurs., Dec. 4	7:00 PM	Baylor	Vanderbilt	Memorial Gymnasium • Nashville, TN	ESPNU	7,740	Baylor (66–63)	Big 12 (2–1)	Big 12 (9-4)
Thurs., Dec. 4	9:00 PM	#20 Iowa State	#18 Arkansas	Hilton Coliseum • Ames, IA	ESPN2	14,384	Iowa State (95–77)	Big 12 (3–1)	Big 12 (10-4)
Thurs., Dec. 4	9:00 PM	TCU	Ole Miss	Tad Smith Coliseum • Oxford, MS	ESPNU	6,370	TCU (66–54)	Big 12 (4–1)	Big 12 (11-4)
Fri., Dec. 5	7:00 PM	#6 Texas	#1 Kentucky	Rupp Arena • Lexington, KY	ESPN	24,340	Kentucky (63–51)	Big 12 (4–2)	Big 12 (11-5)
Fri., Dec. 5	9:00 PM	#11 Kansas	Florida	Allen Fieldhouse • Lawrence, KS	ESPN	16,300	Kansas (71–65)	Big 12 (5–2)	Big 12 (12-5)
Fri., Dec. 5	9:30 PM	#22 Oklahoma	Missouri	Lloyd Noble Center • Norman, OK	ESPNU	11,652	Oklahoma (82–63)	Big 12 (6–2)	Big 12 (13-5)
Sat., Dec. 6	12:00 PM	Oklahoma State	South Carolina	Colonial Life Arena • Columbia, SC	ESPNU	12,007	South Carolina (75–49)	Big 12 (6–3)	Big 12 (13-6)
Sat., Dec. 6	3:15 PM	Kansas State	Tennessee	Thompson–Boling Arena • Knoxville, TN	ESPN2	14,111	Tennessee (65–64)	Big 12 (6–4)	Big 12 (13-7)
Alabama, Georgia, Mississippi State and Texas A&M did not participate for the SEC. All times Eastern

=== 2015–16 ===
Date	Time	Big 12 team	SEC team	Location	TV	Attendance	Winner	Leader	All-Time
Sat., Jan. 30	12:00 PM	#9 West Virginia	Florida	O'Connell Center • Gainesville, FL	ESPN	11,611	Florida (88–71)	SEC (1–0)	Big 12 (13-8)
Sat., Jan. 30	12:00 PM	Texas	Vanderbilt	Frank Erwin Center • Austin, TX	ESPN2	13,041	Texas (72–58)	Tied (1–1)	Big 12 (14-8)
Sat., Jan. 30	2:00 PM	#14 Iowa State	#5 Texas A&M	Reed Arena • College Station, TX	ESPN	12,473	Texas A&M (72–62)	SEC (2–1)	Big 12 (14-9)
Sat., Jan. 30	2:00 PM	TCU	Tennessee	Schollmaier Arena • Fort Worth, TX	ESPN2	5,761	TCU (75–63)	Tied (2–2)	Big 12 (15-9)
Sat., Jan. 30	2:00 PM	Kansas State	Ole Miss	Bramlage Coliseum • Manhattan, KS	ESPNU	12,528	Kansas State (69–64)	Big 12 (3–2)	Big 12 (16-9)
Sat., Jan. 30	4:00 PM	Texas Tech	Arkansas	Bud Walton Arena • Fayetteville, AR	ESPNU	15,975	Arkansas (75–68, OT)	Tied (3–3)	Big 12 (16-10)
Sat., Jan. 30	5:00 PM	#1 Oklahoma	LSU	Pete Maravich Center • Baton Rouge, LA	ESPN	13,882	Oklahoma (77–75)	Big 12 (4–3)	Big 12 (17-10)
Sat., Jan. 30	6:00 PM	#17 Baylor	Georgia	Ferrell Center • Waco, TX	ESPN2	9,675	Baylor (83–73)	Big 12 (5–3)	Big 12 (18-10)
Sat., Jan. 30	7:00 PM	#4 Kansas	#20 Kentucky	Allen Fieldhouse • Lawrence, KS	ESPN	16,300	Kansas (90–84, OT)	Big 12 (6–3)	Big 12 (19-10)
Sat., Jan. 30	8:00 PM	Oklahoma State	Auburn	Auburn Arena • Auburn, AL	ESPN2	8,867	Oklahoma State (74–63)	Big 12 (7–3)	Big 12 (20-10)
Alabama, Missouri, Mississippi State and South Carolina did not participate for the SEC. All times Eastern

=== 2016–17 ===
Date	Time	Big 12 team	SEC team	Location	TV	Attendance	Winner	Leader	All-Time
Sat., Jan. 28	12:00 PM	#18 West Virginia	Texas A&M	WVU Coliseum • Morgantown, WV	ESPN	12,836	West Virginia (81–77)	Big 12 (1–0)	Big 12 (21-10)
Sat., Jan. 28	2:00 PM	Oklahoma	#25 Florida	Lloyd Noble Center • Norman, OK	ESPN	10,859	Florida (84–52)	Tied (1–1)	Big 12 (21-11)
Sat., Jan. 28	2:00 PM	Kansas State	Tennessee	Thompson–Boling Arena • Knoxville, TN	ESPN2	14,398	Tennessee (70–54)	SEC (2–1)	Big 12 (21-12)
Sat., Jan. 28	2:00 PM	Texas Tech	LSU	United Supermarkets Arena • Lubbock, TX	ESPNU	11,056	Texas Tech (77–64)	Tied (2–2)	Big 12 (22-12)
Sat., Jan. 28	4:00 PM	Texas	Georgia	Stegeman Coliseum • Athens, GA	ESPN	10,029	Georgia (59–57)	SEC (3–2)	Big 12 (22-13)
Sat., Jan. 28	4:00 PM	Iowa State	Vanderbilt	Memorial Gymnasium • Nashville, TN	ESPN2	9,851	Vanderbilt (84–78)	SEC (4–2)	Big 12 (22-14)
Sat., Jan. 28	4:00 PM	Oklahoma State	Arkansas	Gallagher-Iba Arena • Stillwater, OK	ESPNU	13,611	Oklahoma State (99–71)	SEC (4–3)	Big 12 (23-14)
Sat., Jan. 28	6:00 PM	#2 Kansas	#4 Kentucky	Rupp Arena • Lexington, KY	ESPN	24,418	Kansas (79–73)	Tied (4–4)	Big 12 (24-14)
Sat., Jan. 28	6:00 PM	#5 Baylor	Ole Miss	The Pavilion at Ole Miss • Oxford, MS	ESPN2	9,411	Baylor (78–75)	Big 12 (5–4)	Big 12 (25-14)
Sat., Jan. 28	6:00 PM	TCU	Auburn	Schollmaier Arena • Fort Worth, TX	ESPNU	6,874	Auburn (88–80)	Tied (5–5)	Big 12 (25-15)
Alabama, Missouri, Mississippi State and South Carolina did not participate for the SEC. All times Eastern

=== 2017–18 ===
Date	Time	Big 12 team	SEC team	Location	TV	Attendance	Winner	Leader	All-Time
Sat., Jan. 27	12:00 PM	Baylor	No. 20 Florida	O'Connell Center • Gainesville, FL	ESPN	10,623	Florida (81–60)	SEC (1–0)	Big 12 (25-16)
Sat., Jan. 27	12:00 PM	No. 14 Texas Tech	South Carolina	Colonial Life Arena • Columbia, SC	ESPN2	14,142	Texas Tech (70–63)	Tied (1–1)	Big 12 (26-16)
Sat., Jan. 27	2:00 PM	Texas	Ole Miss	Frank Erwin Center • Austin, TX	ESPN2	10,913	Texas (85–72)	Big 12 (2–1)	Big 12 (27-16)
Sat., Jan. 27	2:00 PM	Kansas State	Georgia	Bramlage Coliseum • Manhattan, KS	ESPNU	10,314	Kansas State (56–51)	Big 12 (3–1)	Big 12 (28-16)
Sat., Jan. 27	2:15 PM	No. 12 Oklahoma	Alabama	Coleman Coliseum • Tuscaloosa, AL	ESPN	15,383	Alabama (80–73)	Big 12 (3–2)	Big 12 (28-17)
Sat., Jan. 27	4:00 PM	TCU	Vanderbilt	Memorial Gymnasium • Nashville, TN	ESPN2	9,755	Vanderbilt (81–78)	Tied (3–3)	Big 12 (28-18)
Sat., Jan. 27	4:00 PM	Iowa State	No. 22 Tennessee	Hilton Coliseum • Ames, IA	ESPNU	14,384	Tennessee (68–45)	SEC (4–3)	Big 12 (28-19)
Sat., Jan. 27	4:30 PM	No. 5 Kansas	Texas A&M	Allen Fieldhouse • Lawrence, KS	ESPN	16,300	Kansas (79–68)	Tied (4–4)	Big 12 (29-19)
Sat., Jan. 27	6:00 PM	Oklahoma State	Arkansas	Bud Walton Arena • Fayetteville, AR	ESPN2	18,057	Arkansas (66–65)	SEC (5–4)	Big 12 (29-20)
Sat., Jan. 27	7:00 PM	No. 7 West Virginia	Kentucky	WVU Coliseum • Morgantown, WV	ESPN	15,385	Kentucky (83–76)	SEC (6–4)	Big 12 (29-21)
Auburn, LSU, Mississippi State, and Missouri did not participate for the SEC. All times Eastern

=== 2018–19 ===
Date	Time	Big 12 team	SEC team	Location	TV	Attendance	Winner	Leader	All-Time
Sat., Jan. 26	12:00 PM	Baylor	Alabama	Ferrell Center • Waco, TX	ESPNU	7,094	Baylor (73-68)	Big 12 (1–0)	Big 12 (30-21)
Sat., Jan. 26	12:00 PM	No. 24 Iowa State	No. 20 Ole Miss	The Pavilion at Ole Miss • Oxford, MS	ESPN	8,839	Iowa State (87–73)	Big 12 (2–0)	Big 12 (31-21)
Sat., Jan. 26	12:00 PM	TCU	Florida	Schollmaier Arena • Fort Worth, TX	ESPN2	6,682	TCU (55-50)	Big 12 (3–0)	Big 12 (32-21)
Sat., Jan. 26	2:00 PM	Kansas State	Texas A&M	Reed Arena • College Station, TX	ESPN	7,100	Texas A&M (65-53)	Big 12 (3-1)	Big 12 (32-22)
Sat., Jan. 26	2:00 PM	Oklahoma State	South Carolina	Gallagher-Iba Arena • Stillwater, OK	ESPNU	7,658	Oklahoma State (74-70)	Big 12 (4-1)	Big 12 (33-22)
Sat., Jan. 26	2:00 PM	Texas	Georgia	Stegeman Coliseum • Athens, GA	ESPN2	10,374	Georgia (98-88)	Big 12 (4-2)	Big 12 (33-23)
Sat., Jan. 26	4:00 PM	Oklahoma	Vanderbilt	Lloyd Noble Center • Norman, OK	ESPN2	8,848	Oklahoma (86-55)	Big 12 (5-2)	Big 12 (34-23)
Sat., Jan. 26	4:00 PM	West Virginia	No. 1 Tennessee	Thompson–Boling Arena • Knoxville, TN	ESPN	22,149	Tennessee (83-66)	Big 12 (5-3)	Big 12 (34-24)
Sat., Jan. 26	6:00 PM	No. 9 Kansas	No. 8 Kentucky	Rupp Arena • Lexington, KY	ESPN	24,387	Kentucky (71-63)	Big 12 (5-4)	Big 12 (34-25)
Sat., Jan. 26	6:00 PM	No. 14 Texas Tech	Arkansas	United Supermarkets Arena • Lubbock, TX	ESPN2	14,290	Texas Tech (67-64)	Big 12 (6-4)	Big 12 (35-25)
Auburn, LSU, Mississippi State, and Missouri did not participate for the SEC. All times Eastern

=== 2019–20 ===
Date	Time	Big 12 team	SEC team	Location	TV	Attendance	Winner	Leader	All-Time
Sat., Jan. 25	12:00 PM	Iowa State	16 Auburn	Auburn Arena • Auburn, AL	ESPNU	9,121	Auburn (80-76)	SEC (1-0)	Big 12 (35-26)
Sat., Jan. 25	12:00 PM	14 West Virginia	Missouri	WVU Coliseum • Morgantown, WV	ESPN	14,031	West Virginia (74-51)	Tied (1-1)	Big 12 (36-26)
Sat., Jan. 25	2:00 PM	Texas	LSU	Frank Erwin Center • Austin, TX	ESPN	11,287	LSU (69-67)	SEC (2-1)	Big 12 (36-27)
Sat., Jan. 25	2:00 PM	Oklahoma	Mississippi State	Chesapeake Energy Arena • Oklahoma City, OK	ESPN2	6,442	Oklahoma (63-62)	Tied (2-2)	Big 12 (37-27)
Sat., Jan. 25	4:00 PM	3 Kansas	Tennessee	Allen Fieldhouse • Lawrence, KS	ESPN	16,300	Kansas (74-68)	Big 12 (3-2)	Big 12 (38-27)
Sat., Jan. 25	4:00 PM	Oklahoma State	Texas A&M	Reed Arena • College Station, TX	ESPNU	7,622	Oklahoma State (73-62)	Big 12 (4-2)	Big 12 (39-27)
Sat., Jan. 25	4:00 PM	TCU	Arkansas	Bud Walton Arena • Fayetteville, AR	ESPN2	19,200	Arkansas (78-67)	Big 12 (4-3)	Big 12 (39-28)
Sat., Jan. 25	6:00 PM	18 Texas Tech	15 Kentucky	United Supermarkets Arena • Lubbock, TX	ESPN	14,763	Kentucky (76-74)(OT)	Tied (4-4)	Big 12 (39-29)
Sat., Jan. 25	6:00 PM	Kansas State	Alabama	Coleman Coliseum • Tuscaloosa, AL	ESPN2	11,824	Alabama (77-74)	SEC (5-4)	Big 12 (39-30)
Sat., Jan. 25	8:00 PM	1 Baylor	Florida	O'Connell Center • Gainesville, FL	ESPN	11,092	Baylor (72-61)	Tied (5-5)	Big 12 (40-30)
Georgia, Ole Miss, South Carolina, and Vanderbilt did not participate for the SEC. All times Eastern

=== 2020–21 ===
Date	Time	Big 12 team	SEC team	Location	TV	Attendance	Winner	Leader	All-Time
Sat., Jan. 30	Noon	24 Oklahoma	9 Alabama	Lloyd Noble Center • Norman, OK	ESPN	2,680	Oklahoma (66–61)	Big 12 (1–0)	Big 12 (41-30)
Sat., Jan. 30	Noon	Kansas State	Texas A&M	Bramlage Coliseum • Manhattan, KS	ESPNU	942	Texas A&M (68–61)	Tied (1–1)	Big 12 (41-31)
Sat., Jan. 30	2:00 PM	11 West Virginia	Florida	WVU Coliseum • Morgantown, WV	ESPN	1,000	Florida (85–80)	SEC (2–1)	Big 12 (41-32)
Sat., Jan. 30	2:00 PM	10 Texas Tech	LSU	Pete Maravich Assembly Center • Baton Rouge, LA	ESPN2	2,808	Texas Tech (76–71)	Tied (2–2)	Big 12 (42-32)
Sat., Jan. 30	2:00 PM	TCU	12 Missouri	Mizzou Arena • Columbia, MO	ESPNU	3,063	Missouri (102–98) (OT)	SEC (3–2)	Big 12 (42-33)
Sat., Jan. 30	4:00 PM	2 Baylor	Auburn	Ferrell Center • Waco, Texas	ESPN	2,350	Baylor (84–72)	Tied (3–3)	Big 12 (43-33)
Sat., Jan. 30	4:00 PM	Oklahoma State	Arkansas	Gallagher-Iba Arena • Stillwater, OK	ESPN2	3,350	Oklahoma State (81–77)	Big 12 (4–3)	Big 12 (44-33)
Sat., Jan. 30	6:00 PM	15 Kansas	18 Tennessee	Thompson–Boling Arena • Knoxville, TN	ESPN	4,191	Tennessee (81–60)	Tied (4–4)	Big 12 (44-34)
Sat., Jan. 30	6:00 PM	Iowa State	Mississippi State	Humphrey Coliseum • Starkville, MS	ESPN2	1,000	Mississippi State (95–56)	SEC (5–4)	Big 12 (44-35)
Sat., Jan. 30	Georgia, Ole Miss, South Carolina, and Vanderbilt did not participate for the SEC. The Texas-Kentucky game was canceled due to COVID-19. All times Eastern. All games had limited attendance due to the COVID-19 pandemic.								

=== 2021–22 ===
Date	Time	Big 12 team	SEC team	Location	TV	Attendance	Winner	Leader	All-Time
Sat., Jan. 29	12:00 PM	TCU	19 LSU	Schollmaier Arena • Fort Worth, TX	ESPN2	6,539	TCU (77–68)	Big 12 (1–0)	Big 12 (45–35)
Sat., Jan. 29	2:00 PM	Oklahoma	1 Auburn	Auburn Arena • Auburn, AL	ESPN	9,121	Auburn (86–68)	Tied (1–1)	Big 12 (45–36)
Sat., Jan. 29	2:00 PM	West Virginia	Arkansas	Bud Walton Arena • Fayetteville, AR	ESPN2	19,200	Arkansas (77–66)	SEC (2–1)	Big 12 (45–37)
Sat., Jan. 29	2:00 PM	23 Iowa State	Missouri	Hilton Coliseum • Ames, IA	ESPNU	13,612	Iowa State (67–50)	Tied (2–2)	Big 12 (46–37)
Sat., Jan. 29	4:00 PM	4 Baylor	Alabama	Coleman Coliseum • Tuscaloosa, AL	ESPN	14,474	Alabama (87–78)	SEC (3–2)	Big 12 (46–38)
Sat., Jan. 29	4:00 PM	Oklahoma State	Florida	O'Connell Center • Gainesville, FL	ESPN2	10,056	Florida (81–72)	SEC (4–2)	Big 12 (46–39)
Sat., Jan. 29	4:00 PM	Kansas State	Ole Miss	The Sandy and John Black Pavilion at Ole Miss • Oxford, MS	ESPNU	7,135	Ole Miss (67–56)	SEC (5–2)	Big 12 (46–40)
Sat., Jan. 29	6:00 PM	5 Kansas	12 Kentucky	Allen Fieldhouse • Lawrence, KS	ESPN	16,300	Kentucky (80–62)	SEC (6–2)	Big 12 (46–41)
Sat., Jan. 29	6:00 PM	13 Texas Tech	Mississippi State	United Supermarkets Arena • Lubbock, TX	ESPN2	15,098	Texas Tech (76–50)	SEC (6–3)	Big 12 (47–41)
Sat., Jan. 29	8:00 PM	Texas	18 Tennessee	Frank Erwin Center • Austin, TX	ESPN	16,540	Texas (52–51)	SEC (6–4)	Big 12 (48–41)
Georgia, South Carolina, Texas A&M and Vanderbilt did not participate for the SEC. All times Eastern

=== 2022–23 ===
Date	Time	Big 12 team	SEC team	Location	TV	Attendance	Winner	Leader	All-Time
Sat., Jan. 28	12:00 PM	West Virginia	15 Auburn	WVU Coliseum • Morgantown, WV	ESPN	14,116	West Virginia (80–77)	Big 12 (1–0)	Big 12 (49–41)
Sat., Jan. 28	2:00 PM	Oklahoma	2 Alabama	Lloyd Noble Center • Norman, OK	ESPN	10,869	Oklahoma (93–69)	Big 12 (2–0)	Big 12 (50–41)
Sat., Jan. 28	2:00 PM	Texas Tech	LSU	Pete Maravich Assembly Center • Baton Rouge, LA	ESPNU	9,939	Texas Tech (76–68)	Big 12 (3–0)	Big 12 (50–42)
Sat., Jan. 28	2:00 PM	12 Iowa State	Missouri	Mizzou Arena • Columbia, MO	ESPN2	15,601	Missouri (78–61)	Big 12 (3–1)	Big 12 (51–42)
Sat., Jan. 28	4:00 PM	11 TCU	Mississippi State	Humphrey Coliseum • Starkville, MS	ESPN2	8,643	Mississippi State (81–74) (OT)	Big 12 (3–2)	Big 12 (51-43)
Sat., Jan. 28	4:00 PM	17 Baylor	Arkansas	Ferrell Center • Waco, TX	ESPN	10,627	Baylor (67–64)	Big 12 (4–2)	Big 12 (52–43)
Sat., Jan. 28	6:00 PM	10 Texas	4 Tennessee	Thompson–Boling Arena • Knoxville, TN	ESPN	21,678	Tennessee (82–71)	Big 12 (4–3)	Big 12 (52–44)
Sat., Jan. 28	6:00 PM	5 Kansas State	Florida	Bramlage Coliseum • Manhattan, KS	ESPN2	11,000	Kansas State (64–50)	Big 12 (5–3)	Big 12 (53–44)
Sat., Jan. 28	8:00 PM	9 Kansas	Kentucky	Rupp Arena • Lexington, KY	ESPN	20,418	Kansas (77–68)	Big 12 (6–3)	Big 12 (54–44)
Sat., Jan. 28	8:00 PM	Oklahoma State	Ole Miss	Gallagher-Iba Arena • Stillwater, OK	ESPN2	9,973	Oklahoma State (82–60)	Big 12 (7–3)	Big 12 (55–44)
Georgia, South Carolina, Texas A&M and Vanderbilt will not participate for the SEC. All times Eastern

== Team records ==
=== Big 12 Conference (5–3–2) ===
Institution	Wins	Losses	DNP
Baylor Bears	8	2	0
Iowa State Cyclones	4	6	0
Kansas Jayhawks	6	4	0
Kansas State Wildcats	4	6	0
Oklahoma Sooners	7	3	0
Oklahoma State Cowboys	7	3	0
TCU Horned Frogs	5	5	0
Texas Longhorns	4	5	1
Texas Tech Red Raiders	7	3	0
West Virginia Mountaineers	3	7	0
Overall	55	44	—

Because the conferences did not have the same number of members while the series was active (SEC had 14, Big 12 had 10) four teams from the SEC were excluded from participation each year. In all but one year all Big 12 teams played in the Challenge. Texas was scheduled to play in 2021 against Kentucky, but it was cancelled due to the COVID-19 pandemic.

=== Southeastern Conference (3–5–2) ===
Institution	Wins	Loss	DNP
Alabama Crimson Tide	4	2	3
Arkansas Razorbacks	4	4	1
Auburn Tigers	3	5	2
Florida Gators	6	3	0
Georgia Bulldogs	2	2	5
Kentucky Wildcats	5	4	1
LSU Tigers	2	4	3
Missouri Tigers	2	3	4
Mississippi State Bulldogs	1	3	5
Ole Miss Rebels	1	7	2
South Carolina Gamecocks	1	3	5
Tennessee Volunteers	6	3	1
Texas A&M Aggies	3	4	2
Vanderbilt Commodores	2	4	3
Overall	44	55	—

Because the conferences did not have the same number of members while the challenge was active (SEC had 14, Big 12 had 10), four teams from the SEC were excluded from participation each year. The number of times an SEC team is excluded is shown in the "DNP" column in the table above. Kentucky was scheduled to play in 2021 against Texas, but it was cancelled due to the COVID-19 pandemic.

== See also ==
- ACC–Big Ten Challenge
- Big 12/SEC Women's Challenge
- Big East–Big 12 Battle
