= 2013–14 Texas A&M Aggies men's basketball team =

American college basketball season

2013–14 Texas A&M Aggies men's basketball

CBI, Quarterfinals
- Conference: Southeastern Conference
- Record: 18–16 (8–10 SEC)
- Head coach: Billy Kennedy (3rd season)
- Assistant coaches: Glynn Cyprien; Kyle Keller; John Reese
- Home arena: Reed Arena

2013–14 Southeastern Conference men's basketball standings
	Conf.				Overall
Team	W		L	PCT	W		L	PCT
No. 1 Florida †	18	–	0	1.000	36	–	3	.923
Kentucky	12	–	6	.667	29	–	11	.725
Georgia	12	–	6	.667	20	–	14	.588
Tennessee	11	–	7	.611	24	–	13	.649
Arkansas	10	–	8	.556	22	–	12	.647
Missouri	9	–	9	.500	23	–	12	.657
LSU	9	–	9	.500	20	–	14	.588
Ole Miss	9	–	9	.500	19	–	14	.576
Texas A&M	8	–	10	.444	18	–	16	.529
Vanderbilt	7	–	11	.389	15	–	16	.484
Alabama	7	–	11	.389	13	–	19	.406
Auburn	6	–	12	.333	14	–	16	.467
South Carolina	5	–	13	.278	14	–	20	.412
Mississippi State	3	–	15	.167	14	–	19	.424
† 2014 SEC tournament winner Rankings from AP poll

The 2013–14 Texas A&M Aggies men's basketball team represented Texas A&M University in the 2013–14 college basketball season. The team was led by head coach Billy Kennedy, who was in his third season at Texas A&M. The team played their home games at the Reed Arena in College Station, Texas, and was in its second season as a member of the Southeastern Conference.

== Before the season ==
=== Departures ===
Name	Number	Pos.	Height	Weight	Year	Hometown	Reason for departure
Elston Turner	31	G	6'5"	220	RS senior	Missouri City, Texas	Graduated
Jarod Jahns	42	F	6'6"	195	RS senior	Spring, Texas	Graduated
Ray Turner	35	F	6'9"	230	Senior	Houston, Texas	Graduated
Keith Davis	4	C	6'10"	232	Junior	Dallas, Texas	Left team
Daniel Alexander	20	F	6'9"	215	RS sophomore	Dripping Springs, Texas	Transferred to Grand Canyon

=== Recruits ===
College recruiting
Name	Hometown	School	Height	Weight	Commit date
Tony Trocha; PF	Houston, Texas	St. Thomas	6 ft 10 in (2.08 m)	220 lb (100 kg)	Nov 29, 2012
Tony Trocha; PF	Recruit ratings: Scout: Rivals: (77)				
Devante Fitzgerald; SF	Stone Mountain, Georgia	Tucker	6 ft 7 in (2.01 m)	195 lb (88 kg)	Sep 23, 2012
Devante Fitzgerald; SF	Recruit ratings: Rivals: (75)				
Tavario Miller; PF	Houston, Texas	Wheatley	6 ft 8 in (2.03 m)	200 lb (91 kg)	Nov 20, 2012
Tavario Miller; PF	Recruit ratings: Scout: Rivals: (70)				
Overall recruit ranking: Scout: Not Ranked Rivals: Not Ranked ESPN: Not Ranked
Note: In many cases, Scout, Rivals, 247Sports, On3, and ESPN may conflict in their listings of height and weight.; In these cases, the average was taken. ESPN grades are on a 100-point scale.; Sources: "Texas A&M 2013 Basketball Commitments". Rivals.; "2013 Texas A&M Basketball Commits". Scout.; "ESPN". ESPN.; "Scout.com Team Recruiting Rankings". Scout.; "2013 Team Ranking". Rivals.

In addition to the three high school recruits signed, head coach Billy Kennedy also received a commitment from junior college transfer Jamal Jones (Lee College), a small forward from Searcy, Arkansas.

== Roster ==
2013–14 Texas A&M Aggies men's basketball team
Players
Coaches

Pos.	#	Name	Height	Weight	Year	Previous school	Hometown
G	2	Shawn Smith	6 ft 4 in (1.93 m)	192 lb (87 kg)	RS Fr	Faith Baptist Christian	Jacksonville, Florida
F	4	Tavario Miller	6 ft 7 in (2.01 m)	224 lb (102 kg)	Fr	Wheatley (TX)	Long Island, Bahamas
G	5	Jordan Green	6 ft 5 in (1.96 m)	188 lb (85 kg)	Jr	Flower Mound	Flower Mound, Texas
G	10	Blake McDonald	5 ft 11 in (1.8 m)	175 lb (79 kg)	Sr	Klein	Spring, Texas
G	11	J-Mychal Reese	6 ft 1 in (1.85 m)	187 lb (85 kg)	So	Bryan	Bryan, Texas
G	12	Fabyon Harris	5 ft 11 in (1.8 m)	178 lb (81 kg)	Sr	Southern Idaho	Chicago
G	13	Juan Aparicio	6 ft 4 in (1.93 m)	201 lb (91 kg)	So	Second Baptist (TX)	Bogotá, Colombia
F	14	Kourtney Roberson	6 ft 9 in (2.06 m)	244 lb (111 kg)	Jr	Arcadia	Arcadia, Louisiana
F	15	Davonte Fitzgerald	6 ft 7 in (2.01 m)	201 lb (91 kg)	Fr	Tucker	Tucker, Georgia
G	20	Don Thomas	6 ft 0 in (1.83 m)	185 lb (84 kg)	Jr	Lee College	Spring, Texas
G	21	Alex Caruso	6 ft 5 in (1.96 m)	183 lb (83 kg)	So	A&M Consolidated	College Station, Texas
G	23	Jamal Jones	6 ft 8 in (2.03 m)	197 lb (89 kg)	Jr	Lee College	Wynne, Arkansas
F	24	Antwan Space	6 ft 8 in (2.03 m)	224 lb (102 kg)	RS So	Florida State	DeSoto, Texas
G	25	Kyle Dobbins	6 ft 0 in (1.83 m)	172 lb (78 kg)	Fr	Memorial	Houston, Texas
C	45	Dylan Johns	6 ft 11 in (2.11 m)	227 lb (103 kg)	RS Fr	Copleston	Ipswich, England

Head coach

- Billy Kennedy (Southeastern Louisiana)

Assistant coach(es)

- Glenn Cyprien (Texas–San Antonio)
- Kyle Keller (Oklahoma State)
- John Reese (Angelo State)

Legend

- (C) Team captain
- (S) Suspended
- (I) Ineligible
- (W) Walk-on
- Injured
- Current redshirt

== Schedule and results ==
Date time, TV	Rank^{#}	Opponent^{#}	Result	Record	High points	High rebounds	High assists	Site (attendance) city, state
Exhibition
Nov 1*; 7:00 pm		UT Permian Basin	W 80–70	0–0	13 – Harris	8 – Space	4 – Green	Reed Arena (4,122); College Station, Texas
Non-conference games
Nov 8*; 7:00 pm, FSSW		Buffalo	W 82–58	1–0	15 – Green, Roberson	11 – Roberson	8 – Caruso	Reed Arena (4,969); College Station, Texas
Nov 11*; 7:00 pm, FSSW		Mississippi Valley State	W 91–67	2–0	24 – Roberson	10 – Roberson	5 – Caruso	Reed Arena (4,240); College Station, Texas
Nov 15*; 8:00 pm, FSSW		Rice	W 68–65	3–0	19 – Roberson	9 – Roberson	7 – Caruso	Reed Arena (4,816); College Station, Texas
Nov 19*; 7:00 pm, FSSW		Prairie View A&M	W 75–65	4–0	15 – Caruso	8 – Smith	4 – Caruso, Harris	Reed Arena (4,194); College Station, Texas
Nov 24*; 3:00 pm, FSSW		vs. Sam Houston State; Corpus Christi Challenge	W 79–62	5–0	12 – Space	9 – Space	5 – Caruso	Reed Arena (4,218); College Station, Texas
Nov 26*; 7:00 pm, FSSW		vs. Arkansas–Pine Bluff; Corpus Christi Challenge	W 88–55	6–0	18 – Jones	7 – Roberson	4 – Harris	Reed Arena (4,351); College Station, Texas
Nov 29*; 9:00 pm, CBSSN		vs. Missouri State; Corpus Christi Challenge	L 67–73	6–1	16 – Roberson	7 – Space	3 – Caruso	American Bank Center (1,613); Corpus Christi, Texas
Nov 30*; 5:30 pm, CBSSN		vs. SMU; Corpus Christi Challenge	L 52–55	6–2	12 – Fitzgerald	10 – Roberson	2 – Harris	American Bank Center (N/A); Corpus Christi, Texas
Dec 4*; 7:00 pm, ESPN3/FSSW		Houston	W 74–57	7–2	21 – Jones	7 – Jones, Roberson	6 – Green	Reed Arena (4,850); College Station, Texas
Dec 14*; 7:00 pm, FSSW		McNeese State	W 73–60	8–2	16 – Jones	5 – Jones	7 – Caruso	Reed Arena (4,392); College Station, Texas
Dec 21*; 6:15 pm, ESPNU		vs. Oklahoma; Big 12/SEC Challenge	L 52–64	8–3	10 – Green	13 – Roberson	4 – Caruso	Toyota Center (N/A); Houston
Dec 31*; 7:00 pm, FSSW		North Texas	L 41–61	8–4	10 – Caruso	6 – Roberson	2 – Caruso, Green	Reed Arena (4,564); College Station, Texas
Jan 4*; 3:00 pm, FSSW		Texas–Pan American	W 63–46	9–4	16 – Jones	10 – Roberson	6 – Caruso	Reed Arena (5,278); College Station, Texas
Conference games
Jan 8; 8:00 pm, FSSW		Arkansas	W 69–53	10–4 (1–0)	17 – Fitzgerald	8 – Jones	11 – Caruso	Reed Arena (5,102); College Station, Texas
Jan 11; 5:00 pm, FSSW		at Tennessee	W 57–56	11–4 (2–0)	23 – Jones	6 – Roberson	8 – Caruso	Thompson–Boling Arena (18,079); Knoxville, Tennessee
Jan 15; 7:00 pm, SEC TV		South Carolina	W 75–67	12–4 (3–0)	22 – Jones	4 – 3 tied	7 – Caruso	Reed Arena (9,257); College Station, Texas
Jan 18; 12:30 pm, SEC TV		at Mississippi State	L 72–81 ^{OT}	12–5 (3–1)	24 – Jones	6 – Caruso	4 – Caruso, Harris	Humphrey Coliseum (7,073); Starkville, Mississippi
Jan 21; 8:00 pm, ESPN		at No. 14 Kentucky	L 51–68	12–6 (3–2)	12 – Caruso, Fitzgerald	4 – Caruso, Smith	3 – Caruso	Rupp Arena (22,634); Lexington, Kentucky
Jan 25; 12:00 pm, ESPNU		Vanderbilt	L 55–66	12–7 (3–3)	14 – Roberson	10 – Roberson	3 – Jones, Smith	Reed Arena (6,520); College Station, Texas
Jan 29; 6:00 pm, ESPN3		at South Carolina	L 52–80	12–8 (3–4)	9 – Jones, Smith	5 – Harris, Jones	2 – Caruso, Green, Harris, Space	Colonial Life Arena (9,950); Columbia, South Carolina
Feb 1; 3:00 pm, SEC TV		at No. 3 Florida	L 36–69	12–9 (3–5)	7 – Jones, Roberson	7 – Roberson	3 – Caruso	O'Connell Center (12,426); Gainesville, Florida
Feb 5; 8:00 pm, CSS		Mississippi State	W 72–52	13–9 (4–5)	20 – Jones	7 – Jones	10 – Caruso	Reed Arena (4,626); College Station, Texas
Feb 8; 7:00 pm, CSS		at Georgia	L 50–62	13–10 (4–6)	17 – Jones	7 – Roberson	1 – Caruso, Jones, McDonald	Stegeman Coliseum (5,831); Athens, Georgia
Feb 12; 8:00 pm, CSS		LSU	W 83–73	14–10 (5–6)	19 – Jones	10 – Roberson	4 – Smith	Reed Arena (4,782); College Station, Texas
Feb 15; 12:30 pm, SEC TV		at Vanderbilt	L 54–57 ^{OT}	14–11 (5–7)	17 – Jones	13 – Jones	5 – Caruso	Memorial Gymnasium (9,059); Nashville, Tennessee
Feb 20; 6:00 pm, ESPN2		Alabama	W 63–48	15–11 (6–7)	19 – Jones	12 – Space	4 – Roberson, Space	Reed Arena (7,089); College Station, Texas
Feb 22; 2:00 pm, ESPNU		Tennessee	W 68–65 ^{OT}	16–11 (7–7)	14 – Caruso, Jones	7 – Space	7 – Caruso	Reed Arena (6,432); College Station, Texas
Feb 26; 7:00 pm, SEC TV		at LSU	L 49–68	16–12 (7–8)	12 – Green	8 – Roberson	5 – Caruso	Maravich Center (7,689); Baton Rouge, Louisiana
Mar 1; 6:00 pm, FSSW		Ole Miss	W 71–60	17–12 (8–8)	21 – Jones	7 – Caruso	9 – Caruso	Reed Arena (6,811); College Station, Texas
Mar 5; 7:00 pm, ESPN3		at Missouri	L 56–57	17–13 (8–9)	– – –	– – –	– – –	Mizzou Arena (–); Columbia, Missouri
Mar 8; 3:00 pm, SEC TV		Auburn	L 64–69	17–14 (8–10)	– – –	– – –	– – –	Reed Arena (5,254); College Station, Texas
SEC tournament
Mar 13; 12:00 pm, ABC/SECN		vs. Missouri; Second round	L 83–91 ^{2OT}	17–15	28 – Caruso	8 – Caruso	7 – Caruso	Georgia Dome (–); Atlanta
CBI
Mar 19*; 7:00 pm, FCS Pacific		Wyoming; First round	W 59–43	18–15	14 – Roberson	11 – Space	10 – Caruso	Reed Arena (2,346); College Station, Texas
Mar 24*; 8:00 pm		at Illinois State; Quarterfinals	L 55–62	18–16	15 – Space	7 – Roberson	6 – Caruso	Redbird Arena (3,251); Normal, Illinois
*Non-conference game. ^{#}Rankings from AP Poll. (#) Tournament seedings in parentheses. All times are in Central Time.
