= Chris Denson =

American basketball player (born 1991)

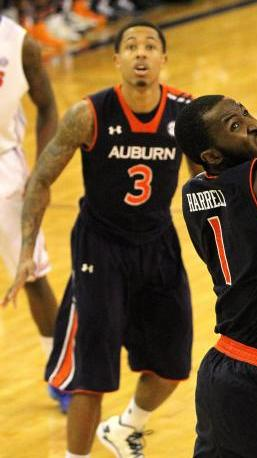
- Denson playing for Auburn in 2014

Personal information
- Born: September 17, 1991 (age 34) Columbus, Georgia, U.S.
- Listed height: 6 ft 2 in (1.88 m)
- Listed weight: 175 lb (79 kg)

Career information
- High school: Shaw (Columbus, Georgia)
- College: Auburn (2010–2014)
- NBA draft: 2014: undrafted
- Playing career: 2014–2015
- Position: Shooting guard

Career history
- 2014–2015: SPM Shoeters Den Bosch

Career highlights
- Second-team All-SEC (2014); DBL champion (2015); DBL All-Star (2015)

Christopher Tyler Denson II (born September 17, 1991) is an American former basketball player. He played college basketball for Auburn. He also played one season of professional basketball with Den Bosch in the Netherlands.

== High school career ==
Denson averaged 24.3 points, 4.7 rebounds, 4.1 assists and 2.5 steals as a senior at Columbus Shaw High School under coach Terry White in 2009–10. He was a McDonald's All-American nominee. He also was a first-team All-State selection as a senior. Denson averaged 13.9 points as a junior, and scored a game-high 38 points versus Liberty County in the Class AAA state tournament in 2010. He helped Shaw advance to the State Playoffs all four years, including an Elite Eight appearance as a freshman, Sweet 16 as a sophomore and then losing a first round heartbreaker as a junior in 2009 when Shaw finished 23–8.

== College career ==
Denson played four seasons collegiately for the Auburn Tigers. He was voted 2014 Associated Press All-SEC Honorable Mention, named All-SEC second team by the league coaches, and an All-District player by the NABC and the USBWA. He averaged 19.1 points his senior season. During his senior year, Denson scored 25 or more points in four straight conference games (February 5–15) and was the first AU player to do that since Keenan Carpenter did it in five straight in 1988–89. He also made 176 out of 268 free throws. His free throw attempts are a single-season Auburn record, breaking John Mengelt's record of 256 from 1970–71.

== Professional career ==
On July 24, 2014, Denson signed a one-year deal with SPM Shoeters Den Bosch of the Dutch Basketball League. He helped Den Bosch win the 2014–15 DBL championship with a 4–1 Finals defeat of Donar Groningen. In 37 league games for Den Bosch, he averaged 14.4 points, 4.3 rebounds and 2.4 assists per game.

On October 31, 2015, Denson was selected by the Delaware 87ers in the third round of the 2015 NBA Development League Draft. However, he was waived on November 11 before the start of the regular season.
