= 2013–14 South Carolina Gamecocks men's basketball team =

American college basketball season

2013–14 South Carolina Gamecocks men's basketball
- Conference: Southeastern Conference
- Record: 14–20 (5–13 SEC)
- Head coach: Frank Martin (2nd season)
- Assistant coaches: Matt Figger; Perry Clark; Lamont Evans
- Home arena: Colonial Life Arena

2013–14 Southeastern Conference men's basketball standings
	Conf.				Overall
Team	W		L	PCT	W		L	PCT
No. 1 Florida †	18	–	0	1.000	36	–	3	.923
Kentucky	12	–	6	.667	29	–	11	.725
Georgia	12	–	6	.667	20	–	14	.588
Tennessee	11	–	7	.611	24	–	13	.649
Arkansas	10	–	8	.556	22	–	12	.647
Missouri	9	–	9	.500	23	–	12	.657
LSU	9	–	9	.500	20	–	14	.588
Ole Miss	9	–	9	.500	19	–	14	.576
Texas A&M	8	–	10	.444	18	–	16	.529
Vanderbilt	7	–	11	.389	15	–	16	.484
Alabama	7	–	11	.389	13	–	19	.406
Auburn	6	–	12	.333	14	–	16	.467
South Carolina	5	–	13	.278	14	–	20	.412
Mississippi State	3	–	15	.167	14	–	19	.424
† 2014 SEC tournament winner Rankings from AP poll

The 2013–14 South Carolina Gamecocks men's basketball team represented the University of South Carolina during the 2013–14 college basketball season. The team's head coach was Frank Martin, who was in his second season at South Carolina. The team played their home games at the Colonial Life Arena in Columbia, South Carolina as a member of the Southeastern Conference.

== Before the season ==
=== Departures ===
Name	Number	Pos.	Height	Weight	Year	Hometown	Notes
Lakeem Jackson	30	Forward	6'5"	230	Senior	Charlotte, North Carolina	Graduated
Shane Phillips	55	Guard	5'10"	170	Senior	Wheeling, West Virginia	Graduated
Damien Leonard	32	Guard	6'4"	192	Sophomore	Greenville, South Carolina	Transferred to Furman
Brian Richardson	2	Guard	6'4"	171	Junior	Wilson, North Carolina	Transferred to High Point
RJ Slawson	33	Forward	6'8"	207	Junior	Charleston, South Carolina	Transferred to Jacksonville
Eric Smith	5	Guard	5'11"	210	Junior	Mullins, South Carolina	Transferred to Coastal Carolina

=== Recruits ===
College recruiting information
Name	Hometown	School	Height	Weight	Commit date
Sindarius Thornwell; SG	Lancaster, SC	Oak Hill Academy (VA)	6 ft 5 in (1.96 m)	180 lb (82 kg)	Oct 1, 2012
Sindarius Thornwell; SG	Recruit ratings: Scout: Rivals: (88)				
Demetrius Henry; PF	Fort Pierce, FL	Faith Baptist	6 ft 9 in (2.06 m)	210 lb (95 kg)	Apr 24, 2013
Demetrius Henry; PF	Recruit ratings: Scout: Rivals: (79)				
Desmond Ringer; C	McDonough, GA	Eagle's Landing	6 ft 9 in (2.06 m)	230 lb (100 kg)	Sep 25, 2012
Desmond Ringer; C	Recruit ratings: Scout: Rivals: (78)				
Duane Notice; SG	Toronto, ON	St. Thomas More (CT)	6 ft 2 in (1.88 m)	195 lb (88 kg)	Apr 1, 2013
Duane Notice; SG	Recruit ratings: Scout: Rivals: (73)				
Justin McKie; SG	Columbia, SC	Irmo	6 ft 3 in (1.91 m)	175 lb (79 kg)	Oct 8, 2013
Justin McKie; SG	Recruit ratings: Rivals: (69)				
Jaylen Shaw; PG	Hartsville, SC	Hartsville	6 ft 0 in (1.83 m)	170 lb (77 kg)	Apr 23, 2013
Jaylen Shaw; PG	Recruit ratings: Rivals: (64)				
Reggie Thues, Jr. SF	Los Angeles, CA	Fairfax	6 ft 6 in (1.98 m)	190 lb (86 kg)	Apr 17, 2013
Reggie Thues, Jr. SF	Recruit ratings: Scout: Rivals: (63)				
Overall recruit ranking: Scout: 28 Rivals: 23 ESPN: 23
Note: In many cases, Scout, Rivals, 247Sports, On3, and ESPN may conflict in their listings of height and weight.; In these cases, the average was taken. ESPN grades are on a 100-point scale.; Sources: "South Carolina 2013 Basketball Commitments". Rivals.; "2013 South Carolina Basketball Commits". Scout.; "ESPN". ESPN.; "Scout.com Team Recruiting Rankings". Scout.; "2013 Team Ranking". Rivals.

== Season ==
=== Preseason ===
Head coach Frank Martin announced the Gamecocks' league schedule on August 20, 2013. The conference schedule was highlighted by trips to Florida, Missouri, Ole Miss, and Tennessee, while playing host to Kentucky, LSU, Florida, and Alabama. The Gamecocks' non-conference schedule was finalized on September 4, 2013. Highlighted by a trip to the annual Diamond Head Classic in Hawaii, the Gamecocks also scheduled games with Oklahoma State (as part of the Big 12/SEC Challenge) and Baylor (as part of the ESPN Hoops Tip-Off Marathon).

The Gamecocks opened their season on November 3 with one exhibition game against USC Aiken, winning 84–72. South Carolina held a 17-point halftime lead but allowed the Pacers to close the gap late.

== Roster ==
2013–14 South Carolina Gamecocks men's basketball team
Players
Coaches

Pos.	#	Name	Height	Weight	Year	Previous school	Hometown
G	0	Sindarius Thornwell	6 ft 5 in (1.96 m)	206 lb (93 kg)	Fr	Oak Hill Academy	Lancaster, SC
G	1	Brenton Williams	5 ft 11 in (1.8 m)	172 lb (78 kg)	Sr	Osceola HS; Santa Fe College	Kissimmee, FL
G	4	Tyrone Johnson	6 ft 3 in (1.91 m)	194 lb (88 kg)	Jr	Montrose Christian School; Villanova	Plainfield, NJ
G	5	Jaylen Shaw	6 ft 0 in (1.83 m)	182 lb (83 kg)	Fr	Hartsville HS	Hartsville, SC
G	10	Duane Notice	6 ft 2 in (1.88 m)	221 lb (100 kg)	Fr	St. Thomas More School	Woodbridge, ON
G	12	Austin Constable	5 ft 11 in (1.8 m)	180 lb (82 kg)	So	Henderson HS	West Chester, PA
F	14	Laimonas Chatkevicius	6 ft 11 in (2.11 m)	250 lb (113 kg)	So	South Kent School	Klaipėda, Lithuania
F	15	Reggie Thues, Jr.	6 ft 6 in (1.98 m)	210 lb (95 kg)	Fr	Fairfax HS	Los Angeles, CA
G	20	Justin McKie	6 ft 4 in (1.93 m)	195 lb (88 kg)	Fr	Irmo HS	Columbia, SC
F/C	21	Demetrius Henry	6 ft 9 in (2.06 m)	215 lb (98 kg)	Fr	Faith Baptist Christian	Miami, FL
G	23	Bruce Ellington	5 ft 9 in (1.75 m)	196 lb (89 kg)	Sr	Berkeley HS	Moncks Corner, SC
F	24	Michael Carrera	6 ft 5 in (1.96 m)	214 lb (97 kg)	So	Montrose Christian School	Anzoátegui, Venezuela
F	25	Mindaugas Kacinas	6 ft 7 in (2.01 m)	210 lb (95 kg)	So	Word of Life School	Klaipėda, Lithuania
F/C	32	Desmond Ringer	6 ft 9 in (2.06 m)	255 lb (116 kg)	Fr	Eagle's Landing HS	McDonough, GA
F	35	Brian Steele	6 ft 5 in (1.96 m)	200 lb (91 kg)	So	Wade Hampton HS	Greenville, SC
F	45	Carlton Geathers	6 ft 10 in (2.08 m)	255 lb (116 kg)	RS Jr	Carvers Bay	Georgetown, SC

Head coach

- Frank Martin (FIU)

Assistant coach(es)

- Matt Figger (Eastern Kentucky)
- Perry Clark (Gettysburg)
- Lamont Evans (Kansas State)

Legend

- (C) Team captain
- (S) Suspended
- (I) Ineligible
- (W) Walk-on
- Injured
- Current redshirt

== Schedule and results ==
Date time, TV	Rank^{#}	Opponent^{#}	Result	Record	Site (attendance) city, state
Exhibition
11/3/2013*; 2:00 pm		USC Aiken	W 84–72	–	Colonial Life Arena (N/A); Columbia, SC
Non-conference games
11/9/2013*; 1:00 pm		Longwood	W 82-44	1–0	Colonial Life Arena (8,536); Columbia, SC
11/12/2013*; 3:00 pm, ESPN		at No. 23 Baylor; ESPN Tip-Off Marathon	L 64–66	1–1	Ferrell Center (5,706); Waco, TX
11/17/2013*; 5:00 pm, ESPN3		at Clemson; Battle of the Palmetto State	L 57–71	1–2	Littlejohn Coliseum (7,283); Clemson, SC
11/24/2013*; 1:00 pm, SPSO		FIU	W 84–72	2–2	Colonial Life Arena (9,869); Columbia, SC
12/6/2013*; 9:30 pm, ESPNU		at No. 9 Oklahoma State; Big 12/SEC Challenge	L 52–79	2–3	Gallagher-Iba Arena (13,611); Stillwater, OK
12/17/2013*; 7:00 pm		Manhattan	L 68–86	2–4	Colonial Life Arena (7,573); Columbia, SC
12/19/2013*; 4:00 pm, SPSO		USC Upstate	L 68–74	2–5	Colonial Life Arena (7,531); Columbia, SC
12/22/2013*; 12:00 am, ESPNU		vs. Saint Mary's; Diamond Head Classic First Round	W 78–71	3–5	Stan Sheriff Center (N/A); Honolulu, HI
12/23/2013*; 9:00 pm, ESPN2		vs. Boise State; Diamond Head Classic Semifinals	L 54–80	3–6	Stan Sheriff Center (6,438); Honolulu, HI
12/25/2013*; 6:30 pm, ESPN2		vs. Akron; Diamond Head Classic 3rd place game	W 69–59	4–6	Stan Sheriff Center (6,769); Honolulu, H
12/28/2013*; 4:00 pm, ESPNU		Akron; Diamond Head Classic	W 78–45	5–6	Colonial Life Arena (7,802); Columbia, SC
12/30/2013*; 7:00 pm, CSS		Marshall	W 92–65	6–6	Colonial Life Arena (7,935); Columbia, SC
1/3/2014*; 7:00 pm, SPSO		South Carolina State	W 82–75	7–6	Colonial Life Arena (7,357); Columbia, SC
Conference games
1/8/2014; 7:00 pm, CSS		at No. 10 Florida	L 58–74	7–7 (0–1)	O'Connell Center (12,147); Gainesville, FL
1/11/2014; 1:30 pm, SECN		LSU	L 68–71	7–8 (0–2)	Colonial Life Arena (12,071); Columbia, SC
1/15/2014; 8:00 pm, SECN		at Texas A&M	L 67–75	7–9 (0–3)	Reed Arena (9,257); College Station, TX
1/18/2014; 4:30 pm, FSN		Ole Miss	L 74–75	7–10 (0–4)	Colonial Life Arena (14,302); Columbia, SC
1/22/2014; 8:00 pm, SECN		at Georgia	L 76–97	7–11 (0–5)	Stegeman Coliseum (5,366); Athens, GA
1/25/2014; 4:00 pm, SECN		at Missouri	L 74–82	7–12 (0–6)	Mizzou Arena (12,033); Columbia, MO
1/29/2014; 7:00 pm, ESPN3		Texas A&M	W 80–52	8–12 (1–6)	Colonial Life Arena (9,950); Columbia, SC
2/1/2014; 1:30 pm, SECN		at Ole Miss	L 71–75	8–13 (1–7)	Tad Smith Coliseum (6,977); Oxford, MS
2/5/2014; 7:00 pm, ESPN3		Auburn	L 74–79	8–14 (1–8)	Colonial Life Arena (8,581); Columbia, SC
2/8/2014; 3:00 pm, ESPNU		at Tennessee	L 53–72	8–15 (1–9)	Thompson-Boling Arena (17,215); Knoxville, TN
2/12/2014; 8:00 pm, SECN		Vanderbilt	W 65–59	9–15 (2–9)	Colonial Life Arena (9,829); Columbia, SC
2/15/2014; 4:00 pm, SECN		Alabama	W 67–66	10–15 (3–9)	Colonial Life Arena (8,186); Columbia, SC
2/19/2014; 9:00 pm, CSS		at Arkansas	L 64–71	10–16 (3–10)	Bud Walton Arena (15,017); Fayetteville, AR
2/22/2014; 1:30 pm, SECN		Georgia	L 56–73	10–17 (3–11)	Colonial Life Arena (13,571); Columbia, SC
2/26/2014; 9:00 pm, FSN		at Auburn	L 67–83	10–18 (3–12)	Auburn Arena (4,434); Auburn, AL
3/1/2014; 6:00 pm, ESPN		No. 17 Kentucky	W 72–67	11–18 (4–12)	Colonial Life Arena (15,303); Columbia, SC
3/4/2014; 7:00 pm, ESPNU		No. 1 Florida	L 46–72	11–19 (4–13)	Colonial Life Arena (12,781); Columbia, SC
3/8/2014; 4:00 pm, SECN		at Mississippi State	W 74–62	12–19 (5–13)	Humphrey Coliseum (6,105); Starkville, MS
SEC tournament
03/12/2014; 7:00 pm		vs. Auburn; First round	W 74–56	13–19	Georgia Dome; Atlanta, GA
03/13/2014; 4:23 pm		vs. Arkansas; Second round	W 71–69	14–19	Georgia Dome; Atlanta, GA
03/14/2014; 3:30 pm		vs. Tennessee; Quarterfinals	L 44–59	14–20	Georgia Dome; Atlanta, GA
*Non-conference game. ^{#}Rankings from AP Poll. (#) Tournament seedings in parentheses. All times are in Eastern Time.

== Honors and awards ==
- Jaylen Shaw was named AgSouth Athlete of the Week on November 25, 2013.
- Sindarius Thornwell was named SEC Freshman of the Week on January 13, 2014 and on February 17, 2014.
- Sindarius Thornwell was named Wayman Tisdale National Freshman of the Week on February 18, 2014.
