= Rod Odom =

American basketball player (born 1991)

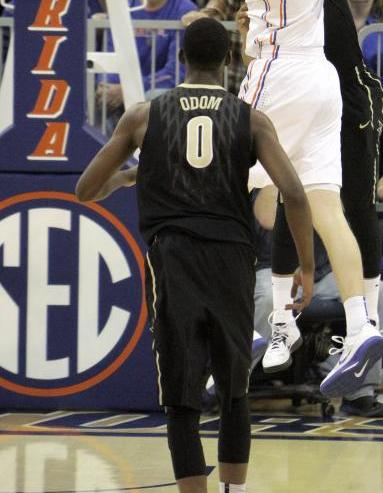

No. 1 – Keravnos
- Position: Power forward
- League: Cyprus Basketball Division 1

Personal information
- Born: September 23, 1991 (age 35) Central Islip, New York
- Listed height: 6 ft 9 in (2.06 m)
- Listed weight: 215 lb (98 kg)

Career information
- High school: Middlesex School (Concord, Massachusetts)
- College: Vanderbilt (2010–2014)
- NBA draft: 2014: undrafted
- Playing career: 2014–present

Career history
- 2014–2015: KAOD
- 2015–2016: Virtus Bologna
- 2016–2017: BC Astana
- 2017–2018: Levallois Metropolitans
- 2018–2019: Nizhny Novgorod
- 2019–present: Keravnos

Career highlights
- Kazakhstan League champion (2017); Kazakhstan Cup winner (2017); Second-team All-SEC (2014)

Roderick Wesley Odom (born September 23, 1991) is an American professional basketball player from Central Islip, New York for Keravnos of the Cyprus Basketball Division 1. He attended Vanderbilt University. Odom is a 6'9, 215 pound combo forward.

== Personal life ==
Odom attended Middlesex School, in Concord, Massachusetts. He played all 5 positions for the Middlesex School where he was one of the most heavily recruited players in the nation. Odom ultimately chose between Harvard, Princeton, Louisville, Arizona and Vanderbilt, and had offers from West Virginia, Michigan, UConn, Boston College, and Oklahoma State as well.

== College career ==
Odom played collegiately at Vanderbilt from 2010 to 2014. He played in all 134 games of his career. He was a member of the Vanderbilt University SEC Championship team in 2012. He managed to improve his number in his last two campaigns by averaging 10.4 points and 4.5 rebounds in his junior year, and 13.6 points and 5.2 rebounds in his senior year. In his senior year he became one of the nation's best three point shooters, while shooting 38.5 percent. He left the Commodores earning All-SEC second team and ALL-SEC honorable mention (Associated Press). He also was named to the SEC Academic honor roll in his senior year. He graduated with a degree in economics, and Corporate Strategy.

== Professional career ==
Odom was selected by the Golden State Warriors, to participate in the NBA Summer League in Las Vegas in the summer of 2014. Odom played power forward for Steve Kerr and the . In August 2014 he signed for Greek Basket League club KAOD. In Odom's rookie season with KAOD, Odom averaged 9 points and 5 rebounds per game.

July 2015, Virtus Bologna finalized an agreement with Rod Odom to play for 2015-2016 Season.

In the 2017–18 season Odom played for Levallois Metropolitans and averaged 10 points and 3.8 rebounds per game. Odom signed with Nizhny Novgorod of the Russian league on July 17, 2018.
