= 2013–14 Missouri Tigers men's basketball team =

American college basketball season

2013–14 Missouri Tigers men's basketball

NIT, second round
- Conference: Southeastern Conference
- Record: 23–12 (9–9 SEC)
- Head coach: Frank Haith
- Assistant coaches: Tim Fuller; Mark Phelps
- Home arena: Mizzou Arena

2013–14 Southeastern Conference men's basketball standings
	Conf.				Overall
Team	W		L	PCT	W		L	PCT
No. 1 Florida †	18	–	0	1.000	36	–	3	.923
Kentucky	12	–	6	.667	29	–	11	.725
Georgia	12	–	6	.667	20	–	14	.588
Tennessee	11	–	7	.611	24	–	13	.649
Arkansas	10	–	8	.556	22	–	12	.647
Missouri	9	–	9	.500	23	–	12	.657
LSU	9	–	9	.500	20	–	14	.588
Ole Miss	9	–	9	.500	19	–	14	.576
Texas A&M	8	–	10	.444	18	–	16	.529
Vanderbilt	7	–	11	.389	15	–	16	.484
Alabama	7	–	11	.389	13	–	19	.406
Auburn	6	–	12	.333	14	–	16	.467
South Carolina	5	–	13	.278	14	–	20	.412
Mississippi State	3	–	15	.167	14	–	19	.424
† 2014 SEC tournament winner Rankings from AP poll

The 2013–14 Missouri Tigers men's basketball team represented the University of Missouri in the 2013–14 NCAA Division I men's basketball season. Their head coach was Frank Haith, who was in his third and final year at Missouri. The team played its home games at Mizzou Arena in Columbia, Missouri, and played its second season in the Southeastern Conference.

On January 13, 2016, it was announced that all 23 wins from the 2013-14 season were to be vacated as a result of a 19-month investigation by the university and the NCAA into the program and former coach Frank Haith.

== Preseason ==
In 2013–14 Head Coach Frank Haith returned one starter (Jabari Brown) and brought in a number of new players as he continued the NCAA Tournament. It was a third new team for Haith, who has less than 40 percent of his scoring, rebounding, assists and steals back from the previous season. However, the addition of a Top 20 recruiting class, the returning of players like seniors Earnest Ross and Tony Criswell and the gained services of transfer Jordan Clarkson had improved the Tigers going into the Southeastern Conference.

=== Departures ===
Name	Number	Pos.	Height	Weight	Year	Hometown	Notes
Phil Pressey	1	G	5'10"	175	Junior	Dallas	Entered 2013 NBA draft
Keion Bell	5	G	6'3"	200	Senior	Los Angeles	Graduated
Domonique Bull	10	G	6'4"	185	Freshman	Worcester, Massachusetts	Transferred to George Washington
Negus Webster-Chan	14	F	6'7"	195	Freshman	Scarborough, Ontario	Transferred to Hawaii
Laurence Bowers	21	F	6'8"	221	Senior	Memphis, Tennessee	Graduated
Alex Oriakhi	42	C	6'9"	245	Senior	Lowell, Massachusetts	Graduated

=== Newcomers ===
College recruiting information
Name	Hometown	School	Height	Weight	Commit date
Wes Clark; PG	Romulus, Michigan	Romulus High School	6 ft 0 in (1.83 m)	175 lb (79 kg)	
Wes Clark; PG	Recruit ratings: Scout: Rivals: (84)				
Johnathan Williams; PF	Memphis, Tennessee	Southwind High School	6 ft 9 in (2.06 m)	210 lb (95 kg)	
Johnathan Williams; PF	Recruit ratings: Scout: Rivals: (87)				
Torren Jones; PF	La Porte, Indiana	La Lumiere School	6 ft 8 in (2.03 m)	215 lb (98 kg)	
Torren Jones; PF	Recruit ratings: Scout: Rivals: (78)				
Shane Rector; PG	South Kent, Connecticut	South Kent High School	6 ft 0 in (1.83 m)	170 lb (77 kg)	
Shane Rector; PG	Recruit ratings: Scout: Rivals: (72)				
Keanau Post; C	Belleville, Illinois	Southwestern Illinois C.C.	6 ft 11 in (2.11 m)	260 lb (120 kg)	
Keanau Post; C	Recruit ratings: Scout: Rivals:				
Overall recruit ranking:
Note: In many cases, Scout, Rivals, 247Sports, On3, and ESPN may conflict in their listings of height and weight.; In these cases, the average was taken. ESPN grades are on a 100-point scale.; Sources: "2013 Missouri Basketball Commitment List". Rivals.; "2013 Missouri Basketball Recruiting Commits". Scout.; "Scout.com Team Recruiting Rankings". Scout.; "2013 Team Ranking". Rivals.

== Roster ==
2013–14 Missouri Tigers men's basketball team
Players
Coaches

Pos.	#	Name	Height	Weight	Year	Previous school	Hometown
G	1	Wes Clark	6 ft 0 in (1.83 m)	171 lb (78 kg)	Fr	Romulus	Detroit
F	2	Tony Criswell	6 ft 9 in (2.06 m)	240 lb (109 kg)	Sr	Douglass; UAB/Independence CC	Oklahoma City
F	3	Johnathan Williams	6 ft 9 in (2.06 m)	208 lb (94 kg)	Fr	Southwind	Memphis, Tennessee
G	4	Corey Haith	5 ft 10 in (1.78 m)	174 lb (79 kg)	So	Rock Bridge	Miami
G	5	Jordan Clarkson	6 ft 5 in (1.96 m)	180 lb (82 kg)	RS Jr	Wagner; Tulsa	San Antonio, Texas
G	10	Deuce Bello (redshirt)	6 ft 4 in (1.93 m)	177 lb (80 kg)	Jr	Westchester Country Day; Baylor	Greensboro, North Carolina
G	14	Shane Rector	6 ft 1 in (1.85 m)	171 lb (78 kg)	Fr	South Kent	Bronx, New York
F	24	Torren Jones	6 ft 8 in (2.03 m)	218 lb (99 kg)	Fr	La Lumiere	Chandler, Arizona
C	25	Zach Price (redshirt)	6 ft 10 in (2.08 m)	250 lb (113 kg)	Jr	Jeffersontown; Louisville	Cleveland, Ohio
F	31	Danny Feldmann	6 ft 9 in (2.06 m)	215 lb (98 kg)	RS Jr	Helias; Columbia	Jefferson City, Missouri
G	32	Jabari Brown	6 ft 5 in (1.96 m)	205 lb (93 kg)	RS Jr	Oakland; Oregon	Oakland, California
G	33	Earnest Ross	6 ft 5 in (1.96 m)	222 lb (101 kg)	RS Sr	Panther Creek; Auburn	Cary, North Carolina
C	44	Ryan Rosburg	6 ft 11 in (2.11 m)	245 lb (111 kg)	So	Marquette	Chesterfield, Missouri
F	45	Keanau Post	6 ft 11 in (2.11 m)	268 lb (122 kg)	Jr	Southwestern Illinois College	Victoria, British Columbia

Head coach

- Frank Haith (Elon)

Assistant coach(es)

- Tim Fuller (Wake Forest)
- Rick Carter (Michigan State)
- Dave Leitao (Northeastern)

Legend

- (C) Team captain
- (S) Suspended
- (I) Ineligible
- (W) Walk-on
- Injured
- Current redshirt

Roster
Last update: 2013-08-22

== Schedule and results ==
Date time, TV	Rank^{#}	Opponent^{#}	Result	Record	High points	High rebounds	High assists	Site (attendance) city, state
Exhibition
Oct 25*; 7:00 pm, Mizzou Network		Oklahoma City	W 73–48	–	15 – Brown	12 – Ross	6 – Clarkson	Hearnes Center (9,222); Columbia, Missouri
Nov 1*; 7:00 pm, Mizzou Network		Central Missouri	W 92–79	–	25 – Ross	13 – Williams	4 – Brown, Clark	Mizzou Arena (7,927); Columbia, Missouri
Non-conference regular season
Nov 8*; 7:00 pm		Southeastern Louisiana	W 89–53	1–0	19 – Brown	7 – Brown, Clark	4 – Clark	Mizzou Arena (7,926); Columbia, Missouri
Nov 12*; 8:00 pm, FSN		Southern Illinois	W 72–59	2–0	31 – Clarkson	9 – Rosburg	5 – Clarkson	Mizzou Arena (6,794); Columbia, Missouri
Nov 16*; 6:00 pm		Hawaiʻi	W 92–80	3–0	23 – Brown	9 – Criswell	5 – Clark, Ross	Sprint Center (13,681); Kansas City, Missouri
Nov 23*; 4:30 pm		Gardner–Webb	W 72–63	4–0	17 – Ross	17 – Williams	5 – Clarkson	Mizzou Arena (6,738); Columbia, Missouri
Nov 25*; 7:00 pm, FSMW		IUPUI	W 78–64	5–0	24 – Brown	10 – Williams	5 – Clark	Mizzou Arena (6,065); Columbia, Missouri
Nov 28*; 9:30 pm, ESPNU		vs. Northwestern; Las Vegas Invitational	W 78–67	6–0	21 – Clarkson	9 – Brown	3 – Clark	Orleans Arena (N/A); Las Vegas
Nov 29*; 7:30 pm, ESPN3		vs. Nevada; Las Vegas Invitational	W 83–70	7–0	28 – Ross	9 – Brown, Ross	4 – Clarkson	Orleans Arena (2,520); Las Vegas
Dec 5*; 6:00 pm, ESPN2		West Virginia; Big 12/SEC Challenge	W 80–71	8–0	25 – Clarkson	10 – Criswell	5 – Clark	Mizzou Arena (7,292); Columbia, Missouri
Dec 7*; 11:30 am, CBS		No. 18 UCLA	W 80–71	9–0	22 – Brown	15 – Williams	6 – Clarkson	Mizzou Arena (8,826); Columbia, Missouri
Dec 15*; 6:00 pm, ESPNU	No. 24	Western Michigan	W 66–60	10–0	15 – Brown	7 – Ross, Williams	5 – Clarkson	Mizzou Arena (7,252); Columbia, Missouri
Dec 21*; 4:30 pm, ESPN2	No. 23	Illinois; Braggin' Rights	L 64–65	10–1	25 – Clarkson	8 – Ross	8 – Clarkson	Scottrade Center (21,987); St. Louis, Missouri
Dec 28*; 7:00 pm, ESPN2	No. 25	at NC State	W 68–64	11–1	21 – Clarkson	13 – Ross	4 – Clarkson	PNC Arena (16,419); Raleigh, North Carolina
Jan 4*; 4:00 pm	No. 25	Long Beach State	W 69–59	12–1	22 – Brown	11 – Rosburg	2 – Clarkson, Ross	Mizzou Arena (8,679); Columbia, Missouri
SEC regular season
Jan 8; 7:00 pm, SECN	No. 21	Georgia	L 64–70 ^{OT}	12–2 (0–1)	19 – Brown	7 – Criswell	3 – Clark	Mizzou Arena (9,298); Columbia, Missouri
Jan 11; 1:00 pm, ESPNU	No. 21	at Auburn	W 70–68	13–2 (1–1)	20 – Clarkson	11 – Jones	3 – Clark	Auburn Arena (7,181); Auburn, Alabama
Jan 16; 6:00 pm, ESPN2		at Vanderbilt	L 75–78	13–3 (1–2)	22 – Brown	9 – Ross	5 – Ross	Memorial Gymnasium (8,478); Nashville, Tennessee
Jan 18; 1:00 pm, ESPN2		Alabama	W 68–47	14–3 (2–2)	24 – Brown	14 – Williams	2 – Clark	Mizzou Arena (11,003); Columbia, Missouri
Jan 21; 6:00 pm, ESPNU		at LSU	L 70–77	14–4 (2–3)	28 – Brown	11 – Ross	3 – Clarkson	Maravich Center (8,411); Baton Rouge, Louisiana
Jan 25; 3:30 pm, SECN		South Carolina	W 82–74	15–4 (3–3)	24 – Brown	6 – Brown	6 – Brown	Mizzou Arena (12,033); Columbia, Missouri
Jan 28; 6:00 pm, ESPNU		at Arkansas	W 75–71	16–4 (4–3)	24 – Ross, Brown	12 – Williams	6 – Clarkson	Bud Walton Arena (15,876); Fayetteville, Arkansas
Feb 1; 12:00 pm, CBS		No. 11 Kentucky	L 79–84	16–5 (4–4)	33 – Brown	6 – Ross	3 – Clarkson, Clark	Mizzou Arena (11,742); Columbia, Missouri
Feb 4; 8:00 pm, ESPN		at No. 3 Florida	L 58–68	16–6 (4–5)	15 – Brown	7 – Rosburg	6 – Brown	O'Connell Center (12,123); Gainesville, Florida
Feb 8; 4:00 pm, FSN		at Ole Miss	L 88–91	16–7 (4–6)	24 – Ross	7 – Brown	4 – Ross, Brown	Tad Smith Coliseum (8,696); Oxford, Mississippi
Feb 13; 4:00 pm, ESPN2		Arkansas	W 86–85	17–7 (5–6)	27 – Clarkson	11 – Ross	4 – Clarkson	Mizzou Arena (12,362); Columbia, Missouri
Feb 15; 3:00 pm, ESPN2		Tennessee	W 75–70	18–7 (6–6)	24 – Brown	5 – Williams, Brown, Clarkson, Jones	5 – Clarkson	Mizzou Arena (14,132); Columbia, Missouri
Feb 19; 7:00 pm, SECN		Vanderbilt	W 67–64	19–7 (7–6)	21 – Clarkson	5 – Clarkson, Brown	5 – Clarkson	Mizzou Arena (9,635); Columbia, Missouri
Feb 22; 7:00 pm, ESPN2		at Alabama	L 73–80	19–8 (7–7)	25 – Ross	8 – Ross	5 – Brown	Coleman Coliseum (10,907); Tuscaloosa, Alabama
Feb 25; 8:00 pm, ESPNU		at Georgia	L 56–71	19–9 (7–8)	17 – Clarkson, Brown	12 – Rosburg	4 – Clarkson	Stegeman Coliseum (5,229); Athens, Georgia
Mar 1; 12:30 pm, SECN		Mississippi State	W 85–66	20–9 (8–8)	21 – Brown	7 – Post	7 – Clarkson	Mizzou Arena (9,403); Columbia, Missouri
Mar 5; 7:00 pm, ESPN3		Texas A&M	W 57–56	21–9 (9–8)	20 – Brown	8 – Williams	3 – Clark	Mizzou Arena (10,655); Columbia, Missouri
Mar 8; 3:00 pm, ESPN		at Tennessee	L 42–75	21–10 (9–9)	13 – Clarkson	5 – Post	3 – Clarkson	Thompson–Boling Arena (18,519); Knoxville, Tennessee
SEC Tournament
Mar 13; 1:00 pm, SEC TV		vs. Texas A&M; Second round	W 91–83 ^{2OT}	22–10	26 – Brown	15 – Williams	4 – Williams	Georgia Dome (9,308); Atlanta, Georgia
Mar 14; 12:00 pm, ESPNU		vs. No. 1 Florida; Quarterfinals	L 49–72	22–11	18 – Brown	5 – Brown	2 – Clark, Clarkson	Georgia Dome (15,273); Atlanta, Georgia
NIT
Mar 18*; 8:00 pm, ESPN2	No. (2)	(7) Davidson; First round	W 85–77	23–11	30 – Brown	6 – Ross	3 – Ross	Mizzou Arena (2,403); Columbia, Missouri
Mar 23*; 4:00 pm, ESPNU	No. (2)	(3) Southern Miss; Second round	L 63–71	23–12	22 – Ross	7 – Williams	5 – Clarkson	Mizzou Arena (6,033); Columbia, Missouri
*Non-conference game. ^{#}Rankings from AP Poll, (#) during NIT is seed within region. (#) Tournament seedings in parentheses. All times are in Central Time.
