= Jordan McRae =

American basketball player (born 1991)

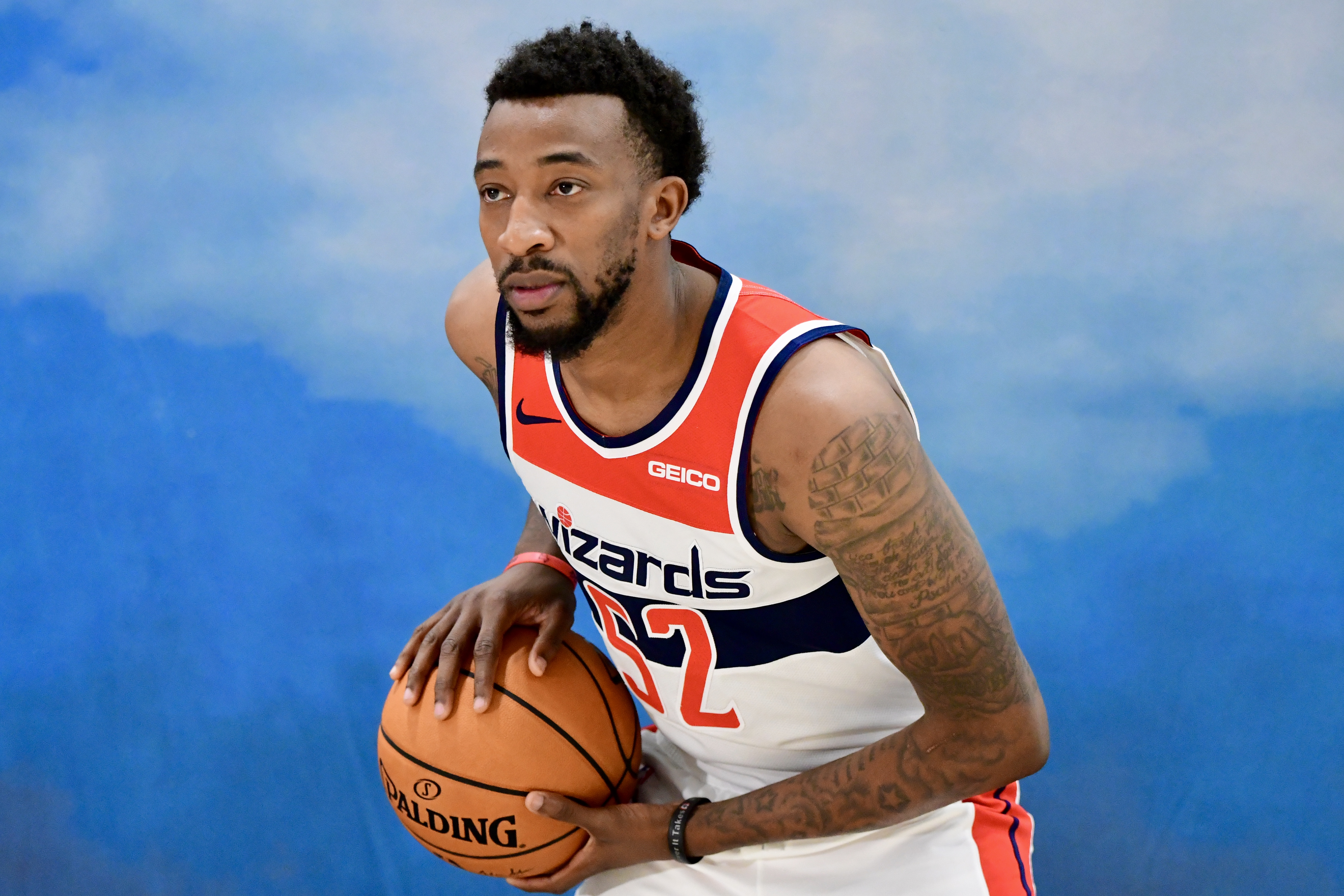
- McRae with the Washington Wizards in 2019

No. 7 – ASK Karditsas
- Position: Small forward / shooting guard
- League: GBL

Personal information
- Born: March 28, 1991 (age 35) Savannah, Georgia, U.S.
- Listed height: 6 ft 5 in (1.96 m)
- Listed weight: 180 lb (82 kg)

Career information
- High school: Liberty County (Hinesville, Georgia)
- College: Tennessee (2010–2014)
- NBA draft: 2014: 2nd round, 58th overall pick
- Drafted by: San Antonio Spurs
- Playing career: 2014–present

Career history
- 2014–2015: Melbourne United
- 2015–2016: Delaware 87ers
- 2016: Phoenix Suns
- 2016–2017: Cleveland Cavaliers
- 2016: →Canton Charge
- 2017–2018: Saski Baskonia
- 2018–2020: Washington Wizards
- 2018–2019: →Capital City Go-Go
- 2020: Denver Nuggets
- 2020: Detroit Pistons
- 2021: Beijing Ducks
- 2021–2022: Metropolitans 92
- 2022–2023: Hapoel Tel Aviv
- 2023–2024: AEK Athens
- 2024: Al Ittihad Alexandria
- 2024: Scafati Basket
- 2025: APR Kigali
- 2025–2026: Hapoel Holon
- 2026–present: Karditsa

Career highlights
- NBA champion (2016); All-NBA G League First Team (2019); NBA G League Top Scorer (2019); All-Israeli League Second Team (2023); NBA D-League All-Star (2016); All-NBL Second Team (2015); Greek All-Star (2023); 2× First-team All-SEC (2013, 2014)
- Stats at NBA.com
- Stats at Basketball Reference

Jordan Tyler McRae (born March 28, 1991) is an American professional basketball player for Karditsa of the Greek Basketball League (GBL). He played college basketball for the University of Tennessee Volunteers, with whom he was twice First-team All-SEC. McRae was drafted 58th overall in the 2014 NBA draft by the San Antonio Spurs, but never appeared in an NBA game for them, and won an NBA championship with the Cleveland Cavaliers in 2016. He is a 1.96 meters (6 ft 5 in) tall shooting guard-small forward.

McRae formerly held the NBA G League single-game scoring record (61 points). After spending time in the NBA G League and overseas, he signed with the Washington Wizards in 2018, and then in 2020 with the Detroit Pistons, his most recent NBA team.

== High school career ==
McRae attended Liberty County High School in Hinesville, Georgia, where he led the Panthers to multiple quarter-finals appearances, while earning prestigious All-State honors and a nomination for the 2010 McDonald's All-American Boys Game. He played one of his greatest high school basketball games to cap off his career with Liberty County, recording 37 points, 13 rebounds, and 5 assists. As a senior in 2009–10, he averaged 24 points, eight rebounds, seven assists, and four blocks per game.

McRae also played with the highly regarded Atlanta Celtics in the Amateur Athletic Union, which had previously been led by Josh Smith and Jordan Adams.

Considered a four-star recruit by Rivals.com, McRae was listed as the No. 10 shooting guard and the No. 38 player in the nation in 2010.

== College career ==
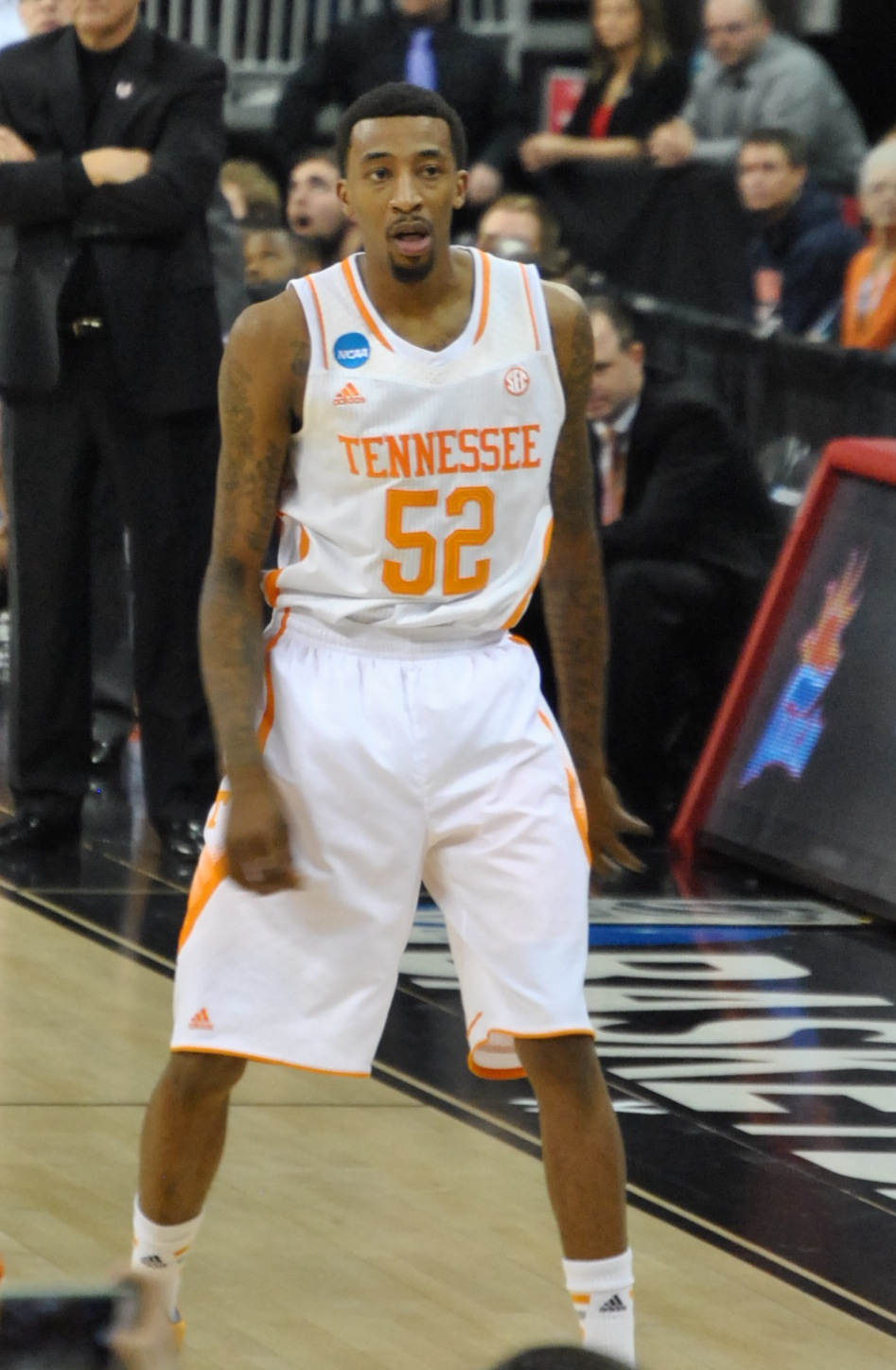
McRae with the Tennessee Volunteers in 2014

After appearing in just 10 games as a freshman for the University of Tennessee Volunteers, McRae played in all 34 games as a sophomore in 2011–12 while earning 15 starting assignments. He also boosted his points per game average from 1.8 as a freshman to 8.6 as a sophomore as he was one of the SEC's top sixth men in 2011–12, coming off the bench to score in double figures in six of UT's last 14 games.

As a junior in the 2012–13 season, McRae appeared in all 33 games with 22 starts as he finished the season as Tennessee's team leader in scoring (15.7 ppg; 4th in the SEC), minutes played (33.6 mpg), three-pointers made (60) and attempted (169), and three-point percentage (.355). He also ranked second in assists (2.0 apg), blocks (0.9 bpg), and steals (0.8 spg) while earning first-team All-SEC and first-team USBWA All-District IV honors.

As a senior in the 2013–14 season, McRae started all 37 games while averaging 18.7 points (4th in the SEC), 3.5 rebounds, 2.5 assists, and 1.0 steals per game as he earned first-team All-SEC and second-team NABC Division I All-District 21 honors.During Tennessee's four NCAA Tournament games, he led the team in scoring (19.8 ppg) and blocks (1.5 bpg) while also averaging 3.5 rebounds and 2.0 assists per game.

In his four-year career at Tennessee, McRae played 114 games (74 starts) while averaging 13.3 points, 3.3 rebounds, and 1.8 assists in 27.1 minutes per game while shooting 41.7 percent from the floor.

== Professional career ==
=== Melbourne United (2014–2015) ===
On June 26, 2014, McRae was selected with the 58th overall pick in the 2014 NBA draft by the San Antonio Spurs. He was later traded to the Philadelphia 76ers on draft night, and went on to join the team for the 2014 NBA Summer League. In four summer league games, he averaged 21.0 points, 2.5 rebounds, 1.0 assists, and 1.8 steals per game.

On August 29, 2014, McRae signed with Melbourne United for the 2014–15 NBL season. On December 24, 2014, he was named Player of the Week for Round 11 after scoring 30 points twice in wins over Wollongong and Sydney. He went on to earn Player of the Month honors for December. On the season, he averaged 19.9 points (2nd in the Australian NBL), 4.7 rebounds, 2.7 assists, and 1.0 steals in 27 games, and finished third in scoring, 11th in steals, 12th in blocks and 13th in assists in the entire league.

=== Delaware 87ers (2015–2016) ===
On March 5, 2015, McRae was acquired by the Delaware 87ers, the 76ers' D-League affiliate. He made his debut for the 87ers the following day, recording 5 points, 4 rebounds, and 4 assists as a starter in a 123–112 win over the Fort Wayne Mad Ants. On March 22, he recorded career-highs with 39 points and 13 rebounds in a 124–120 overtime loss to the Oklahoma City Blue. For the 2015-16 season, in 13 games he averaged 18.4 points, 3.8 assists, and 1.1 steals per game.

In July 2015, McRae re-joined the Philadelphia 76ers for the 2015 NBA Summer League, where he averaged 12.5 points and 3.0 rebounds in four games. On September 27, 2015, he signed with the 76ers, only to be waived by the team on October 26 after appearing in seven preseason games. On November 2, he was reacquired by the 87ers.

On January 26, 2016, McRae scored a career-high and set a D-League single-game record with 61 points, as well as recording 11 rebounds and 7 assists, in a 130–123 overtime win over the Canton Charge. As of March 3, 2022, 61 points stood as the 2nd-best total (only surpassed on March 23, 2016, by Russ Smith). He was later named on the East All-Star team for the 2016 NBA D-League All-Star Game. For the 2015-16 season, in 29 games he averaged 23.3 points, 6.2 assists, and 1.7 steals per game while shooting .799 from the free throw line.

=== Phoenix Suns (2016) ===
On January 29, 2016, McRae signed a 10-day contract with the Phoenix Suns. He made his NBA debut later that night, recording 12 points, 4 assists, 2 rebounds and 1 steal in 25 minutes off the bench in a 102–84 loss to the New York Knicks. On February 8, he signed a second 10-day contract with the Suns. On February 11, he was assigned to the Bakersfield Jam in order to play in the D-League All-Star Game. He was recalled by the Suns five days later after posting seven points and five assists in 14 minutes off the bench in the East's 128–124 win over the West. He played for the Suns on February 19, scoring eight points in 14 minutes off the bench against the Houston Rockets. His contract expired following the game, and on February 23, he re-joined Delaware.

=== Cleveland Cavaliers (2016–2017) ===
On February 28, McRae signed a 10-day contract with the Cleveland Cavaliers. Later that day, he made his debut for the Cavaliers in a 113–99 loss to the Washington Wizards, recording eight points and one rebound in seven minutes off the bench. On March 9, he signed a multi-year contract with the Cavaliers. On April 11, he was assigned to the Canton Charge for a day of training. He was reassigned to Canton the next day to help the team in Game 1 of the D-League Eastern Conference Finals against the Sioux Falls Skyforce.

The next day, McRae was recalled by the Cavaliers and that night, he scored an NBA career-high 36 points, along with four rebounds and seven assists in 47 minutes, against the Detroit Pistons, including a three-pointer to send the game into overtime. In overtime, he had a chance to tie it in the final second, but battling leg cramps, he missed two free throws after being fouled on a three-pointer. The Cavaliers made it to the 2016 NBA Finals where they defeated the Golden State Warriors 4–3. Despite the Cavaliers going down 3–1 in the series following a Game 4 loss, they went on to win the series in seven games to become the first team in NBA history to win the championship after being down 3–1.

On June 28, 2016, the Cavaliers exercised their 2016–17 team option on McRae's contract. He later joined the Cavaliers for the 2016 NBA Summer League, where after averaging 24.3 points per game, he was named to the All-Summer League First Team. On December 31, 2016, McRae made his first start of the season in place of the injured Kyrie Irving and scored a season-high 20 points in a 121–109 win over the Charlotte Hornets. On March 1, 2017, McRae was waived by the Cavaliers. With Cleveland and Phoenix combined, in 2015-16 in 22 games he averaged 8.9 minutes, 4.5 points, and 1.1 assists, per game while shooting .455 from three-point range.>

=== Baskonia (2017) ===
On August 20, 2017, McRae signed a one-year deal with Baskonia. On January 6, 2018, McRae parted ways with Baskonia. He underwent surgery on his left shoulder in Vitoria-Gasteiz and was expected to be sidelined for five more months, missing the remainder of the season. He was first injured on September 15 and was only able to play four games. He took part in four EuroLeague games, averaging five points, 1.0 assists, 1.0 steals, and three fouls drawn per game.

=== Washington Wizards (2018–2020) ===
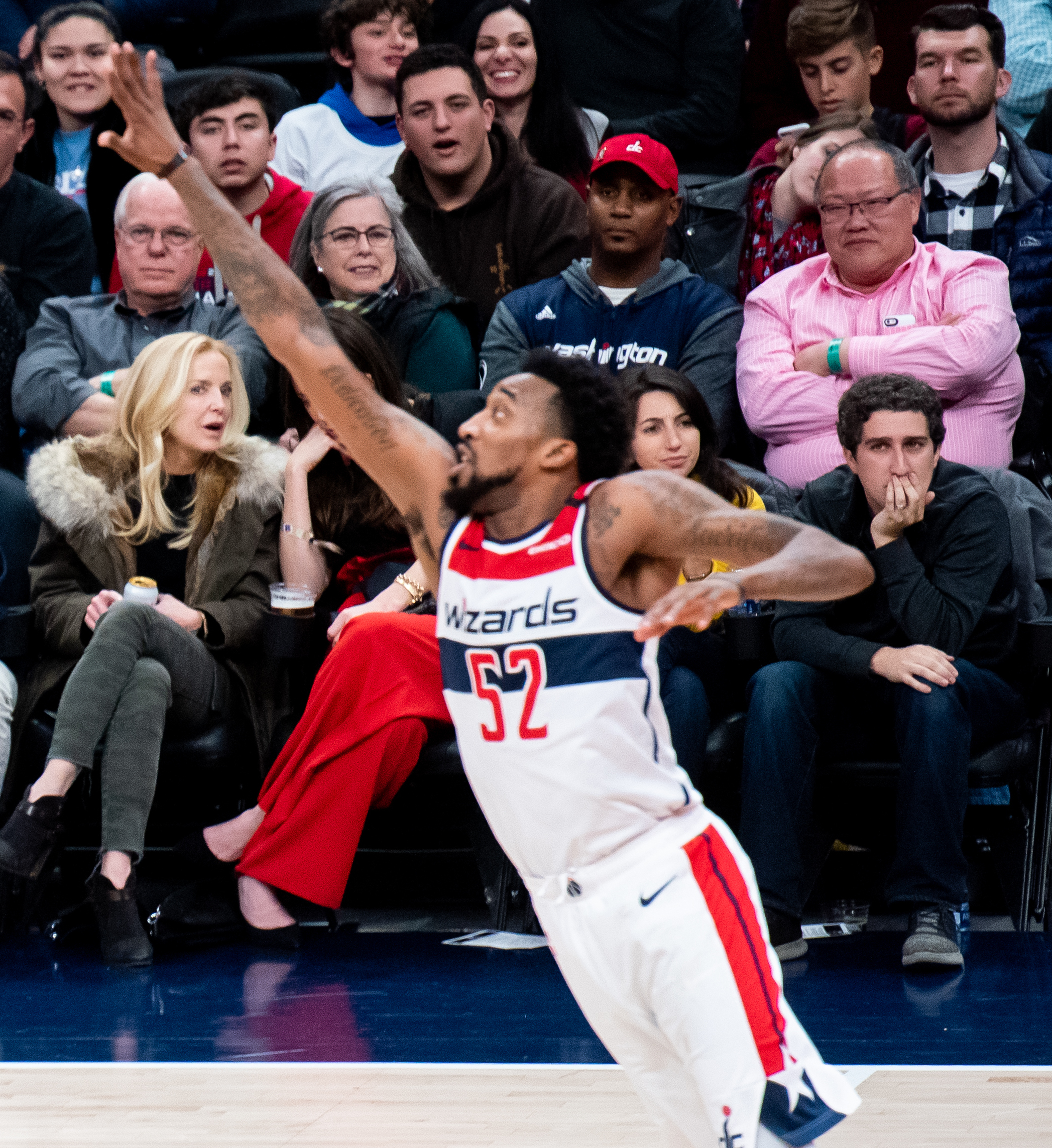
McRae in 2020

On September 20, 2018, the Washington Wizards announced that they had signed McRae to a two-way contract with the Capital City Go-Go of the NBA G League.

On January 18, 2019, McRae set a new NBA G League season-high with 54 points in a win against the Maine Red Claws. In the G League, he averaged 30.4 points, 4.9 rebounds, 3.9 assists, and 1.6 steals per game, and shot .849 from the free throw line. On April 9, 2019, the Washington Wizards announced that they had converted McRae's two-way contract to a standard NBA contract. In the 2018-19 season in 27 games he averaged 12.3 minutes, 5.9 points, and 1.1 assists per game while shooting .800 from the free throw line. In the 2019-20 season with Washington in 29 games he averaged 22.6 minutes, 12.8 points, 2.5 assists, and 0,7 steals per game.

=== Denver Nuggets (2020) ===
On February 6, 2020, McRae was traded to the Denver Nuggets in exchange for Shabazz Napier. In the 2019-20 season with Denver in 4 games he averaged 8.0 minutes, 2.3 points, and 1.0 assist per game. On March 1, 2020, McRae was waived by the Nuggets after a contract buyout agreement was reached.

=== Detroit Pistons (2020) ===
On March 4, 2020, the Detroit Pistons claimed McRae off waivers. In the 2019-20 season with Detroit in 4 games he averaged 24.5 minutes, 11.8 points, and 1.8 assists per game. On March 1, 2020, McRae was waived by the Nuggets after a contract buyout agreement was reached.

=== Beijing Ducks (2020–2021) ===
On December 27, 2020, McRae signed a contract with the Beijing Ducks worth $1.5M for 25 games. He played seven games, in which he averaged 11.3 points, 1.3 assists, and 0.6 steals per game.

=== Metropolitans 92 (2021–2022) ===
On August 22, 2021, McRae signed with Metropolitans 92 of the LNB Pro A. In 31 games he averaged 13.8 points, 2.5 assists, and 1.0 steals per game.

=== Hapoel Tel Aviv (2022–2023) ===
On September 23, 2022, he signed with Hapoel Tel Aviv of the Israeli Basketball Premier League. In 47 games he averaged 15.7 points, 2.6 assists, and 1.0 steals per game.

=== AEK Athens (2023–2024) ===
On July 14, 2023, he signed a one-year contract with GBL club AEK Athens. In 21 games he averaged 13.9 points, 2.2 assists, and 0,9 steals per game, while shooting .814 from the free throw line.

=== Scafati Basket (2024) ===
On October 28, 2024, he signed with Scafati Basket of the Lega Basket Serie A (LBA). In five games he averaged 3.8 points and 0.8 assists per game.

=== Hapoel Holon (2025–present) ===
In the 2025–26 season, McRae played for Hapoel Holon of the Israeli Basketball Premier League. In 31 games he averaged 16.0 points, 2.2 assists, and 0.8 steals per game, while shooting .889 from the free throw line.

== Career statistics ==
Legend
GP	Games played	GS	Games started	MPG	Minutes per game
FG%	Field goal percentage	3P%	3-point field goal percentage	FT%	Free throw percentage
RPG	Rebounds per game	APG	Assists per game	SPG	Steals per game
BPG	Blocks per game	PPG	Points per game	**Bold**	Career high
†	Won an NBA championship

=== NBA ===
==== Regular season ====
Year	Team	GP	GS	MPG	FG%	3P%	FT%	RPG	APG	SPG	BPG	PPG
2015–16	Phoenix	7	0	11.7	.423	.273	**.800**	1.1	1.4	.4	.0	5.3
2015–16†	Cleveland	15	1	7.5	.442	**.636**	.692	.8	1.0	.0	.1	4.1
2016–17	Cleveland	**37**	**4**	10.4	.387	.353	.794	1.1	.5	.2	.2	4.4
2018–19	Washington	27	0	12.3	**.469**	.286	.784	1.5	1.1	.5	.3	5.9
2019–20	Washington	29	**4**	22.6	.420	.377	.771	3.6	**2.8**	**.7**	**.5**	**12.8**
2019–20	Denver	4	0	8.0	.333	.500	.750	1.3	1.0	.5	.3	2.3
2019–20	Detroit	4	0	**24.5**	.326	.188	.727	**3.8**	1.8	.0	.0	11.8
Career		123	9	13.8	.417	.355	.772	1.8	1.4	.4	.2	6.9

==== Playoffs ====
Year	Team	GP	GS	MPG	FG%	3P%	FT%	RPG	APG	SPG	BPG	PPG
2016†	Cleveland	2	0	2.0	1.000	1.000	—	1.0	.0	.0	.0	4.5
Career		2	0	2.0	1.000	1.000	—	1.0	.0	.0	.0	4.5

=== College ===
Year	Team	GP	GS	MPG	FG%	3P%	FT%	RPG	APG	SPG	BPG	PPG
2010–11	Tennessee	10	0	5.3	.316	.111	.455	.8	.0	.2	.4	1.8
2011–12	Tennessee	34	15	21.7	.377	.328	.759	2.9	1.5	.6	.8	8.6
2012–13	Tennessee	33	22	**33.5**	.423	**.355**	.771	**4.1**	2.0	**.8**	.9	15.7
2013–14	Tennessee	**37**	**37**	32.2	**.436**	.351	**.788**	3.5	**2.5**	.7	**1.0**	**18.7**
Career		114	74	27.1	.417	.343	.769	3.3	1.8	.6	.9	13.3
