= Jarnell Stokes =

American basketball player (born 1994)

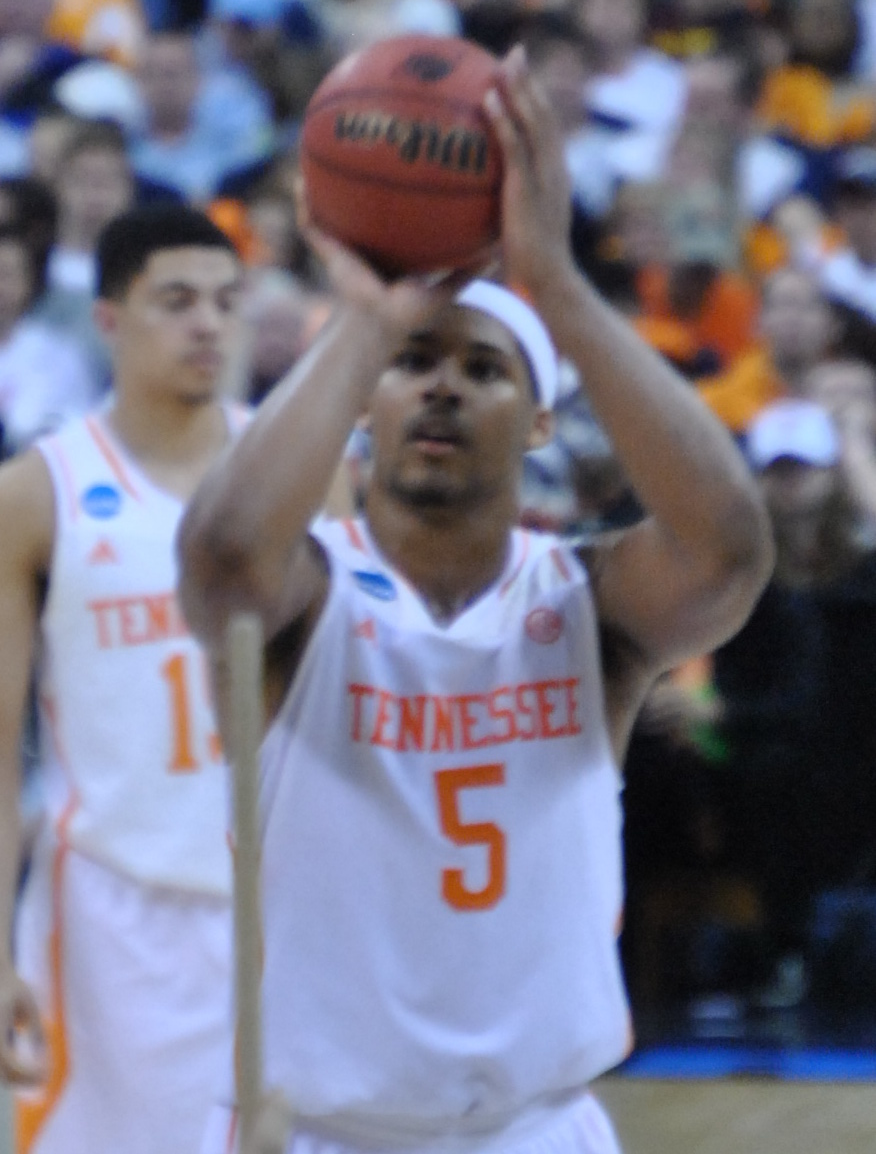
- Stokes playing for the Tennessee Volunteers

Personal information
- Born: January 7, 1994 (age 32) Memphis, Tennessee, U.S.
- Listed height: 6 ft 9 in (2.06 m)
- Listed weight: 263 lb (119 kg)

Career information
- High school: Southwind (Memphis, Tennessee)
- College: Tennessee (2011–2014)
- NBA draft: 2014: 2nd round, 35th overall pick
- Drafted by: Utah Jazz
- Playing career: 2014–2020
- Position: Power forward / center
- Number: 1, 12

Career history
- 2014–2015: Memphis Grizzlies
- 2014–2015: →Iowa Energy
- 2015–2016: Miami Heat
- 2015–2016: →Sioux Falls Skyforce
- 2016: Sioux Falls Skyforce
- 2016: Denver Nuggets
- 2017: Sioux Falls Skyforce
- 2017–2018: Zhejiang Golden Bulls
- 2018: Sioux Falls Skyforce
- 2019: Memphis Hustle
- 2019–2020: Xinjiang Flying Tigers

Career highlights
- NBA D-League champion (2016); NBA D-League Finals MVP (2016); NBA D-League MVP (2016); All-NBA D-League First Team (2016); NBA D-League All-Star (2016); First-team All-SEC (2014); Second-team All-SEC (2013); SEC All-Freshman team (2012)
- Stats at NBA.com
- Stats at Basketball Reference
Medals
Men's basketball
Representing United States
FIBA World U19 Championship
Gold medal – first place	2013 Czech Republic	National team
FIBA Americas U18 Championship
Gold medal – first place	2012 Brazil	National team

Jarnell D'Marcus Stokes (born January 7, 1994) is an American former professional basketball player. He played college basketball for the Tennessee Volunteers. He was one of the top rated high school players in the class of 2011. He was selected in with the 35th overall pick in the 2014 NBA draft by the Utah Jazz, and later traded to the Memphis Grizzlies.

== High school career ==
Stokes was ranked as the No. 11 overall prospect by Rivals.com and No. 18 by ESPN.com. As a junior at Central High School, he averaged 17.2 points and 9.2 rebounds per game.

Stokes chose Tennessee over offers from Arkansas, Connecticut, Florida, Kentucky, Memphis, and Ole Miss.

College recruiting
Name	Hometown	School	Height	Weight	Commit date
Jarnell Stokes; PF	Memphis, TN	Southwind HS	6 ft 8 in (2.03 m)	250 lb (110 kg)	Dec 22, 2011
Jarnell Stokes; PF	Recruit ratings: Scout: Rivals: (97)				

== College career ==
Stokes played three collegiate seasons at the University of Tennessee, averaging 13.0 points, 9.6 rebounds and 1.08 blocks on .530 shooting in 29.7 minutes in 87 games. He left the Volunteers ranked fourth in school history in double-doubles (40), eighth in total rebounds (836) and 14th in blocks (94). He also led the SEC in offensive rebounding in 2013 and 2014.

== Professional career ==
=== Memphis Grizzlies (2014–2015) ===
On June 26, 2014, Stokes was selected with the 35th overall pick in the 2014 NBA draft by the Utah Jazz. He was later traded to the Memphis Grizzlies on draft night. In July 2014, he joined the Grizzlies for the 2014 NBA Summer League before going on to sign a multi-year deal with the franchise on August 18, 2014. On December 3, 2014, he scored a season-high 12 points in a loss to the Houston Rockets. During his rookie season, he had multiple assignments with the Iowa Energy of the NBA Development League.

=== Miami Heat (2015–2016) ===
On November 10, 2015, Stokes was traded, along with Beno Udrih, to the Miami Heat in exchange for Mario Chalmers and James Ennis. The move reunited him with former Tennessee teammate Josh Richardson. On January 20, 2016, he made his debut for the Heat in a 106–87 loss to the Washington Wizards, recording four points in five minutes.

During his sophomore season, he received multiple assignments to the Sioux Falls Skyforce, the Heat's D-League affiliate. On January 29, 2016, he was named in the East All-Star team for the 2016 NBA D-League All-Star Game.

On February 18, 2016, Stokes was traded, along with cash considerations, to the New Orleans Pelicans in exchange for a conditional 2018 second-round pick. He was waived by the Pelicans the next day.

=== Sioux Falls Skyforce (2016) ===
On February 27, 2016, Stokes was acquired by the Sioux Falls Skyforce. He helped the Skyforce win an NBA D-League-record 40 games in 2015–16, securing the first seed in the Eastern Conference playoffs. In 28 regular season games, he averaged team highs of 20.6 points and 9.3 rebounds per game. He subsequently earned league MVP honors. Stokes went on to help the Skyforce cap off a historic season with a playoff run that ended in a 2–1 Finals series victory over the Los Angeles D-Fenders. He added to his regular season MVP award by garnering the Finals MVP, as well as earning All-NBA D-League First Team honors.

=== Denver Nuggets (2016) ===
In July 2016, Stokes joined the San Antonio Spurs for the 2016 NBA Summer League. On September 15, 2016, he signed with the Denver Nuggets. On November 15, 2016, he was waived by the Nuggets after appearing in two games.

=== Second stint with Sioux Falls Skyforce (2017) ===
On March 23, 2017, Stokes was reacquired by the Sioux Falls Skyforce.

=== Zhejiang Golden Bulls (2017–2018) ===
In July 2017, Stokes signed with the Zhejiang Golden Bulls of the Chinese Basketball Association. On February 2, 2018, he was waived by the Zhejiang Golden Bulls.

=== Third stint with Sioux Falls Skyforce (2018) ===
On August 27, 2018, Stokes returned to the Miami Heat on a training camp contract. He was waived on October 13.

On December 8, 2018, Stokes was reacquired by the Sioux Falls Skyforce.

=== Memphis Hustle (2019) ===
On January 1, 2019, Stokes was signed to a two-way contract by the Memphis Grizzlies, to split time with their G League affiliate, the Memphis Hustle.

=== Xinjiang Flying Tigers (2019–2020) ===
On February 12, 2019, Stokes was reported to have signed with the Xinjiang Flying Tigers of the Chinese Basketball Association. He debuted with the Flying Tigers on the same day, making a double-double with 30 points, 19 rebounds, 2 blocks and a steal in a 120–115 victory over the Shanxi Brave Dragons. In July 2019, Stokes returned for the 2019 NBA Summer League to play for the Portland Trail Blazers.

On July 23, 2024, Stokes signed with the Goyang Sono Skygunners of the Korean Basketball League (KBL). However, Stoke violated the contract by not entering South Korea to join the team on the scheduled date. On September 14, his contract was terminated and replaced by D. J. Burns. On September 19, Stokes was banned from KBL for following two seasons.

== NBA career statistics ==
Legend
GP	Games played	GS	Games started	MPG	Minutes per game
FG%	Field goal percentage	3P%	3-point field goal percentage	FT%	Free throw percentage
RPG	Rebounds per game	APG	Assists per game	SPG	Steals per game
BPG	Blocks per game	PPG	Points per game	**Bold**	Career high

=== Regular season ===
Year	Team	GP	GS	MPG	FG%	3P%	FT%	RPG	APG	SPG	BPG	PPG
2014–15	Memphis	**19**	**2**	**6.6**	.568	.000	**.536**	**1.8**	.2	.3	**.3**	**3.0**
2015–16	Memphis	2	0	2.0	.000	.000	.000	1.0	.0	.0	.0	.0
2015–16	Miami	5	0	2.8	.600	.000	.500	.4	.2	.2	.0	1.4
2016–17	Denver	2	0	3.5	**1.000**	.000	.500	1.0	**1.0**	**.5**	.0	1.5
Career		28	2	5.4	.581	.000	.531	1.4	.3	.3	.2	2.4

== Personal life ==
The son of Willie and Shunta Stokes, he majored in Communication Studies.
