= 2013–14 Arkansas Razorbacks men's basketball team =

American college basketball season

2013–14 Arkansas Razorbacks men's basketball

NIT, second round
- Conference: Southeastern Conference
- Record: 22–12 (10–8 SEC)
- Head coach: Mike Anderson (3rd season)
- Home arena: Bud Walton Arena

2013–14 Southeastern Conference men's basketball standings
	Conf.				Overall
Team	W		L	PCT	W		L	PCT
No. 1 Florida †	18	–	0	1.000	36	–	3	.923
Kentucky	12	–	6	.667	29	–	11	.725
Georgia	12	–	6	.667	20	–	14	.588
Tennessee	11	–	7	.611	24	–	13	.649
Arkansas	10	–	8	.556	22	–	12	.647
Missouri	9	–	9	.500	23	–	12	.657
LSU	9	–	9	.500	20	–	14	.588
Ole Miss	9	–	9	.500	19	–	14	.576
Texas A&M	8	–	10	.444	18	–	16	.529
Vanderbilt	7	–	11	.389	15	–	16	.484
Alabama	7	–	11	.389	13	–	19	.406
Auburn	6	–	12	.333	14	–	16	.467
South Carolina	5	–	13	.278	14	–	20	.412
Mississippi State	3	–	15	.167	14	–	19	.424
† 2014 SEC tournament winner Rankings from AP poll

The 2013–14 Arkansas Razorbacks men's basketball team represented the University of Arkansas in the 2013–14 college basketball season. The team's head coach is Mike Anderson. The team played their home games at Bud Walton Arena in Fayetteville, Arkansas, as a member of the SEC.

== Preseason ==
Coach Mike Anderson completed his second season by posting a 19–13 record during the 2012–2013 season, where the Razorbacks finished seventh in the SEC. The Razorbacks did not participate in any postseason play.

=== Departures ===
Name	Number	Pos.	Height	Weight	Year	Hometown	Notes
B. J. Young	11	G	6'3"	180	Sophomore	St. Louis, Missouri	Entered 2013 NBA draft
Hunter Mickelson	21	F	6'10"	245	Sophomore	Jonesboro, Arkansas	Transferred to Kansas
Marshawn Powell	33	F	6'7"	240	Junior	Newport News, Virginia	Entered 2013 NBA draft

=== Incoming class ===
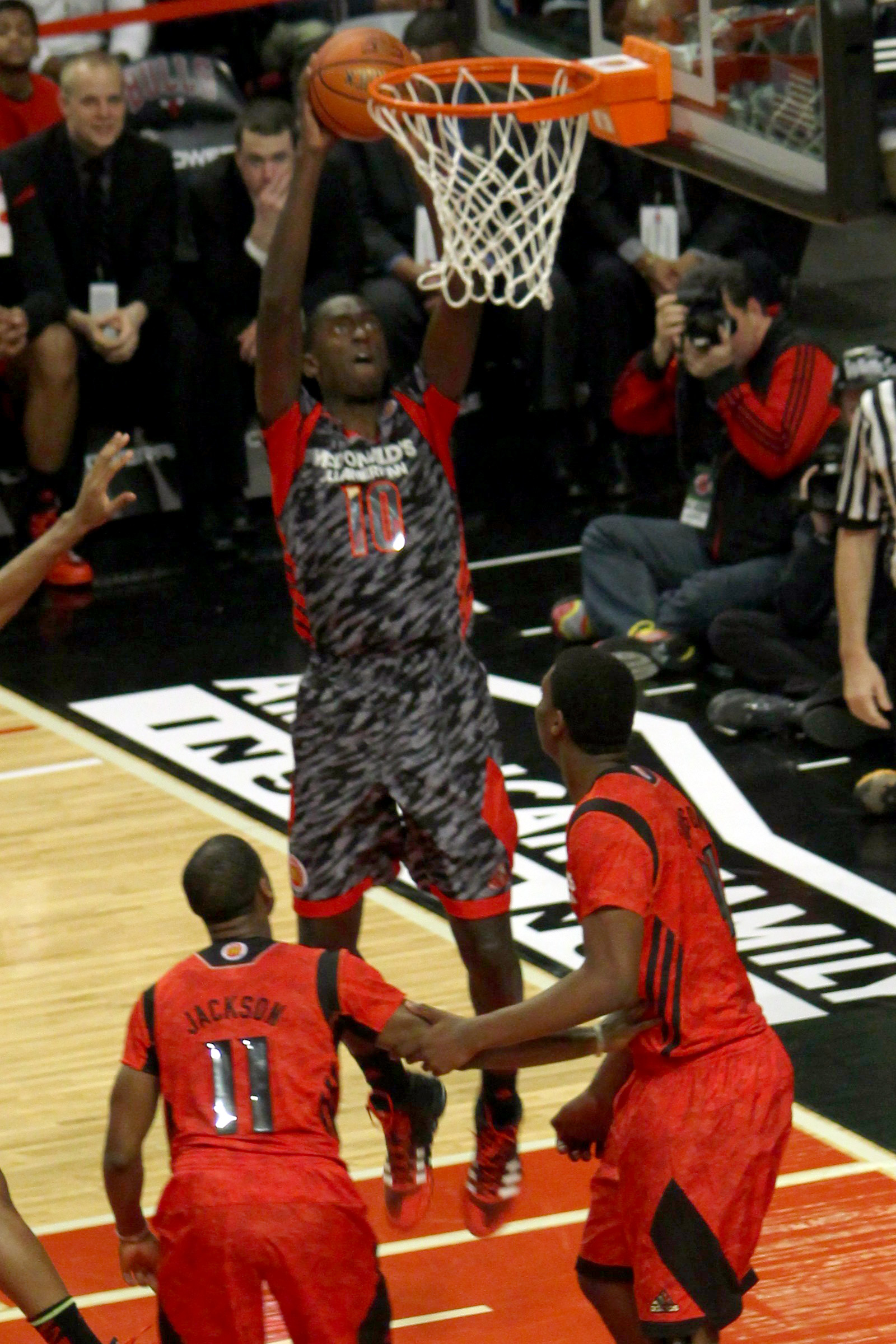
Bobby Portis in the 2013 McDonald's All-American Boys Game

College recruiting information
Name	Hometown	School	Height	Weight	Commit date
Moses Kingsley; C	New Albany, Mississippi	Huntington Prep School	6 ft 9 in (2.06 m)	210 lb (95 kg)	Sep 15, 2012
Moses Kingsley; C	Recruit ratings: Scout: Rivals: (93)				
Bobby Portis; F	Little Rock, Arkansas	Hall	6 ft 10 in (2.08 m)	225 lb (102 kg)	Aug 6, 2011
Bobby Portis; F	Recruit ratings: Scout: Rivals: (95)				
Overall recruit ranking:
Note: In many cases, Scout, Rivals, 247Sports, On3, and ESPN may conflict in their listings of height and weight.; In these cases, the average was taken. ESPN grades are on a 100-point scale.; Sources: "Arkansas 2013 Basketball Commitments". Rivals.; "2013 Arkansas Basketball Commits". Scout.; "ESPN". ESPN.; "Scout.com Team Recruiting Rankings". Scout.; "2013 Team Ranking". Rivals.

== Postseason ==
For the first time since the 2007–08 season, the Razorbacks were invited to a postseason tournament, earning a spot in the NIT after winning 21 games in the regular season. Arkansas drew Indiana State as its first round opponent, the first meeting between the two programs since the 1979 Midwest regional final, and defeated the Sycamores 91-71 at home. Arkansas fell to California on the road in the second round, 75-64.

== Roster ==
2013–14 Arkansas Razorbacks men's basketball team
Players
Coaches

Pos.	#	Name	Height	Weight	Year	Hometown
G	00	Rashad Madden	6 ft 5 in (1.96 m)	180 lb (82 kg)	Jr	Lepanto, Arkansas
G	1	Mardracus Wade	6 ft 2 in (1.88 m)	176 lb (80 kg)	Sr	Memphis, Tennessee
G	2	Alandise Harris	6 ft 6 in (1.98 m)	230 lb (104 kg)	RS Jr	Little Rock, Arkansas
G	3	Rickey Scott	6 ft 3 in (1.91 m)	205 lb (93 kg)	Sr	Irving, Texas
F	4	Coty Clarke	6 ft 7 in (2.01 m)	232 lb (105 kg)	Sr	Antioch, Tennessee
G	5	Anthlon Bell	6 ft 3 in (1.91 m)	188 lb (85 kg)	So	Bartlett, Tennessee
F	10	Bobby Portis	6 ft 11 in (2.11 m)	242 lb (110 kg)	Fr	Little Rock, Arkansas
G	12	Fred Gulley III	6 ft 2 in (1.88 m)	180 lb (82 kg)	Sr	Fayetteville, Arkansas
G	20	Kikko Haydar	5 ft 11 in (1.8 m)	165 lb (75 kg)	Sr	Fayetteville, Arkansas
G	21	Manuale Watkins	6 ft 3 in (1.91 m)	200 lb (91 kg)	Fr	Fayetteville, Arkansas
F	22	JaCorey Williams	6 ft 8 in (2.03 m)	204 lb (93 kg)	So	Birmingham, Alabama
G	23	DeQuavious Wagner	5 ft 10 in (1.78 m)	176 lb (80 kg)	So	Alexandria, Louisiana
G	24	Michael Qualls	6 ft 6 in (1.98 m)	210 lb (95 kg)	So	Shreveport, Louisiana
F	33	Moses Kingsley	6 ft 10 in (2.08 m)	230 lb (104 kg)	Fr	New Albany, Mississippi
F	55	Keaton Miles (redshirt)	6 ft 7 in (2.01 m)	217 lb (98 kg)	Jr	Dallas, Texas

Head coach

- Mike Anderson (Tulsa)

Assistant coach(es)

- Melvin Watkins (Charlotte)
- T. J. Cleveland (Arkansas)
- Matt Zimmerman (Arkansas)

Legend

- (C) Team captain
- (S) Suspended
- (I) Ineligible
- (W) Walk-on
- Injured
- Current redshirt

Roster
Last update: 2013-12-20

== Schedule and results ==
Date time, TV	Rank^{#}	Opponent^{#}	Result	Record	High points	High rebounds	High assists	Site (attendance) city, state
Exhibition
Nov 1*; 7:00 pm		Missouri Southern	W 99–82	–	14 – Clarke	12 – Portis	4 – Haydar	Bud Walton Arena (5,323); Fayetteville, Arkansas
Nov 5*; 7:00 pm		Northeastern State	W 81–54	–	14 – Littleton	7 – Hobbs	2 – Six Tied	Bud Walton Arena (4,525); Fayetteville, Arkansas
Non-conference regular season
Nov 8*; 7:00 pm		SIU Edwardsville	W 99–65	1–0	18 – Bell	8 – Clarke	5 – Gulley	Bud Walton Arena (6,543); Fayetteville, Arkansas
Nov 15*; 7:00 pm		Louisiana–Lafayette	W 76–63	2–0	19 – Harris	8 – Qualls	5 – Qualls	Bud Walton Arena (12,780); Fayetteville, Arkansas
Nov 18*; 7:00 pm		SMU	W 89–78	3–0	21 – Harris	8 – Clarke	4 – Tied	Bud Walton Arena (11,455); Fayetteville, Arkansas
Nov 25*; 2:00 pm, ESPN2		vs. California; 2013 EA Sports Maui Invitational tournament	L 77–85	3–1	21 – Qualls	6 – Harris	3 – Tied	Lahaina Civic Center (2,400); Maui, HI
Nov 26*; 1:00 pm, ESPN2		vs. Minnesota; 2013 EA Sports Maui Invitational Tournament	W 87–73	4–1	15 – Harris	8 – Qualls	4 – Gulley	Lahaina Civic Center (2,400); Maui, HI
Nov 27*; 4:00 pm, ESPN2		vs. No. 11 Gonzaga; 2013 EA Sports Maui Invitational Tournament	L 81–91	4–2	18 – Portis	7 – Tied	3 – Tied	Lahaina Civic Center (2,400); Maui, HI
Dec 3*; 7:00 pm, RSN		Southeastern Louisiana	W 111–65	5–2	16 – Tied	5 – Portis	4 – Harris	Bud Walton Arena (11,765); Fayetteville, Arkansas
Dec 7*; 1:00 pm, CSS		Clemson	W 74–68	6–2	17 – Qualls	7 – Harris	3 – Tied	Bud Walton Arena (13,967); Fayetteville, Arkansas
Dec 12*; 7:00 pm, RSN		Savannah State	W 72–43	7–2	21 – Madden	11 – Portis	2 – Tied	Bud Walton Arena (11,449); Fayetteville, Arkansas
Dec 19*; 7:00 pm, RSN		UT Martin	W 102–56	8–2	15 – Clarke, Portis	12 – Kingsley	5 – Scott	Bud Walton Arena (11,370); Fayetteville, Arkansas
Dec 21*; 7:00 pm, RSN		South Alabama	W 72–60	9–2	15 – Portis	8 – Clarke	2 – Tied	Verizon Arena (10,627); North Little Rock, Arkansas
Dec 28*; 7:00 pm, RSN		High Point	W 89–48	10–2	16 – Portis	9 – Portis, Kingsley	3 – Tied	Bud Walton Arena (13,397); Fayetteville, Arkansas
Jan 4*; 7:00 pm, RSN		UTSA	W 104–71	11–2	19 – Portis	10 – Portis	4 – Qualls	Bud Walton Arena (13,045); Fayetteville, Arkansas
SEC regular season
Jan 8; 8:00 pm, FSN		at Texas A&M	L 53–69	11–3 (0–1)	12 – Madden	10 – Clarke	4 – Clarke	Reed Arena (5,102); College Station, Texas
Jan 11; 12:00 pm, ESPN2		No. 10 Florida	L 82–84 ^{OT}	11–4 (0–2)	23 – Madden	14 – Clarke	3 – Tied	Bud Walton Arena (18,040); Fayetteville, Arkansas
Jan 14; 8:00 pm, ESPN		No. 13 Kentucky	W 87–85 ^{OT}	12–4 (1–2)	18 – Tied	10 – Portis	4 – Qualls	Bud Walton Arena (18,386); Fayetteville, Arkansas
Jan 18; 12:30 pm, SECN		at Georgia	L 61–66 ^{OT}	12–5 (1–3)	13 – Clarke	7 – Tied	5 – Qualls	Stegeman Coliseum (6,662); Athens, Georgia
Jan 22; 7:00 pm, SECN		at Tennessee	L 74–81	12–6 (1–4)	16 – Clarke	9 – Clarke	3 – Tied	Thompson–Boling Arena (14,034); Knoxville, Tennessee
Jan 25; 5:00 pm, FSN		Auburn	W 86–67	13–6 (2–4)	24 – Madden	9 – Portis	5 – Tied	Bud Walton Arena (17,034); Fayetteville, Arkansas
Jan 28; 6:00 pm, ESPNU		Missouri	L 71–75	13–7 (2–5)	20 – Madden	7 – Portis	6 – Gulley	Bud Walton Arena (14,102); Fayetteville, Arkansas
Feb 1; 4:00 pm, ESPNU		at LSU	L 74–88	13–8 (2–6)	17 – Madden	5 – Tied	2 – Madden	Maravich Center (10,925); Baton Rouge, Louisiana
Feb 5; 7:00 pm, SECN		Alabama	W 65–58	14–8 (3–6)	35 – Portis	9 – Portis	6 – Madden	Bud Walton Arena (8,015); Fayetteville, Arkansas
Feb 8; 3:00 pm, SECN		at Vanderbilt	W 77–75	15–8 (4–6)	17 – Qualls	5 – Tied	3 – Tied	Memorial Gymnasium (10,647); Nashville, Tennessee
Feb 13; 6:00 pm, ESPN		at Missouri	L 85–86	15–9 (4–7)	17 – Madden	8 – Portis	4 – Madden	Mizzou Arena (12,362); Columbia, Missouri
Feb 15; 4:00 pm, ESPNU		LSU	W 81–70	16–9 (5–7)	21 – Madden	9 – Clarke	5 – Madden	Bud Walton Arena (18,904); Fayetteville, Arkansas
Feb 19; 8:00 pm, CSS		South Carolina	W 71–64	17–9 (6–7)	20 – Qualls	12 – Clarke	4 – Tied	Bud Walton Arena (9,548); Fayetteville, Arkansas
Feb 22; 3:00 pm, SECN		at Mississippi State	W 73–69	18–9 (7–7)	19 – Bell	9 – Clarke	7 – Clarke	Humphrey Coliseum (6,981); Starkville, Mississippi
Feb 27; 6:00 pm, ESPN		at No. 17 Kentucky	W 71–67 ^{OT}	19–9 (8–7)	14 – Qualls	7 – Tied	4 – Madden	Rupp Arena (23,908); Lexington, Kentucky
Mar 1; 3:00 pm, SECN		Georgia	W 87–75	20–9 (9–7)	23 – Clarke	8 – Portis	3 – Tied	Bud Walton Arena (18,547); Fayetteville, Arkansas
Mar 5; 7:00 pm, ESPN3		Ole Miss	W 110–80	21–9 (10–7)	23 – Bell	8 – Kingsley	7 – Madden	Bud Walton Arena (16,508); Fayetteville, Arkansas
Mar 8; 3:00 pm, ESPN3		at Alabama	L 58–83	21–10 (10–8)	19 – Madden	6 – Qualls	2 – Tied	Coleman Coliseum (10,961); Tuscaloosa, Alabama
SEC Tournament
Mar 13; 4:23 pm, SEC TV		vs. South Carolina; Second round	L 69–71	21–11	13 – Clarke	5 – Clarke	4 – Madden	Georgia Dome (9,308); Atlanta
NIT
Mar 18*; 8:00 pm, ESPN	No. (3)	(6) Indiana State; First round	W 91–71	22–11	28 – Bell	13 – Portis	5 – Madden	Bud Walton Arena (7,697); Fayetteville, Arkansas
Mar 24*; 10:00 pm, ESPN2	No. (3)	(2) California; Second round	L 64-75	22–12	15 – Madden	10 – Portis	5 – Madden	Haas Pavilion (2,518); Berkeley, California
*Non-conference game. ^{#}Rankings from AP poll, (#) during NIT is seed within region. (#) Tournament seedings in parentheses. All times are in Central Time.

Source: 2013–14 Schedule
