= 2013–14 Florida Gators men's basketball team =

American college basketball season

2013–14 Florida Gators men's basketball

SEC regular season and tournament champions

NCAA tournament, Final Four
- Conference: Southeastern Conference

Ranking
- Coaches: No. 3
- AP: No. 1
- Record: 36–3 (18–0 SEC)
- Head coach: Billy Donovan (18th season)
- Assistant coaches: Rashon Burno; Matt McCall; John Pelphrey
- Home arena: O'Connell Center

2013–14 Southeastern Conference men's basketball standings
	Conf.				Overall
Team	W		L	PCT	W		L	PCT
No. 1 Florida †	18	–	0	1.000	36	–	3	.923
Kentucky	12	–	6	.667	29	–	11	.725
Georgia	12	–	6	.667	20	–	14	.588
Tennessee	11	–	7	.611	24	–	13	.649
Arkansas	10	–	8	.556	22	–	12	.647
Missouri	9	–	9	.500	23	–	12	.657
LSU	9	–	9	.500	20	–	14	.588
Ole Miss	9	–	9	.500	19	–	14	.576
Texas A&M	8	–	10	.444	18	–	16	.529
Vanderbilt	7	–	11	.389	15	–	16	.484
Alabama	7	–	11	.389	13	–	19	.406
Auburn	6	–	12	.333	14	–	16	.467
South Carolina	5	–	13	.278	14	–	20	.412
Mississippi State	3	–	15	.167	14	–	19	.424
† 2014 SEC tournament winner Rankings from AP poll

The 2013–14 Florida Gators men's basketball team represented the University of Florida in the sport of basketball during the 2013–14 college basketball season. The Gators competed in Division I of the National Collegiate Athletic Association (NCAA) and the Southeastern Conference (SEC). They were led by head coach Billy Donovan, and played their home games in the O'Connell Center on the university's Gainesville, Florida, campus.

The Gators finished the SEC regular season with an 18–0 record in conference play, the first SEC team to ever accomplish the feat, after the SEC re-expanded to an 18-game regular season schedule prior to the 2012–13 season. In doing so, the Gators won their seventh SEC regular season championship, and their third in four seasons. The Gators beat the Kentucky Wildcats 61–60 to claim the fourth SEC Tournament championship title.

By claiming the SEC tournament, the Gators earned an automatic bid to the NCAA tournament, and were selected as the #1 overall seed, and were placed in the South Regional. The Gators defeated all of their first four opponents by at least 10 points and advanced to the Final Four as the only #1 seed remaining. At that point, the Gators had a school record winning streak of 30 wins, dating back to December 2, 2013, where the Gators lost in a tight game at UConn 64–65. The Gators' semifinal opponent was a rematch against UConn, who had won the East Regional. The Gators got off to a quick start; however, the Huskies were able to catch up and led at halftime. In the second half, the Gators fell farther behind, giving up numerous turnovers, and missing numerous field goals. The Gators eventually suffered only their third (and worst) loss of the season to eventual national champion UConn once again, 63–53, and ended the heavily favored Gators' hopes at earning a third national championship.

== Roster ==
Florida recruits at the 2013 McDonald's All-American Boys Game

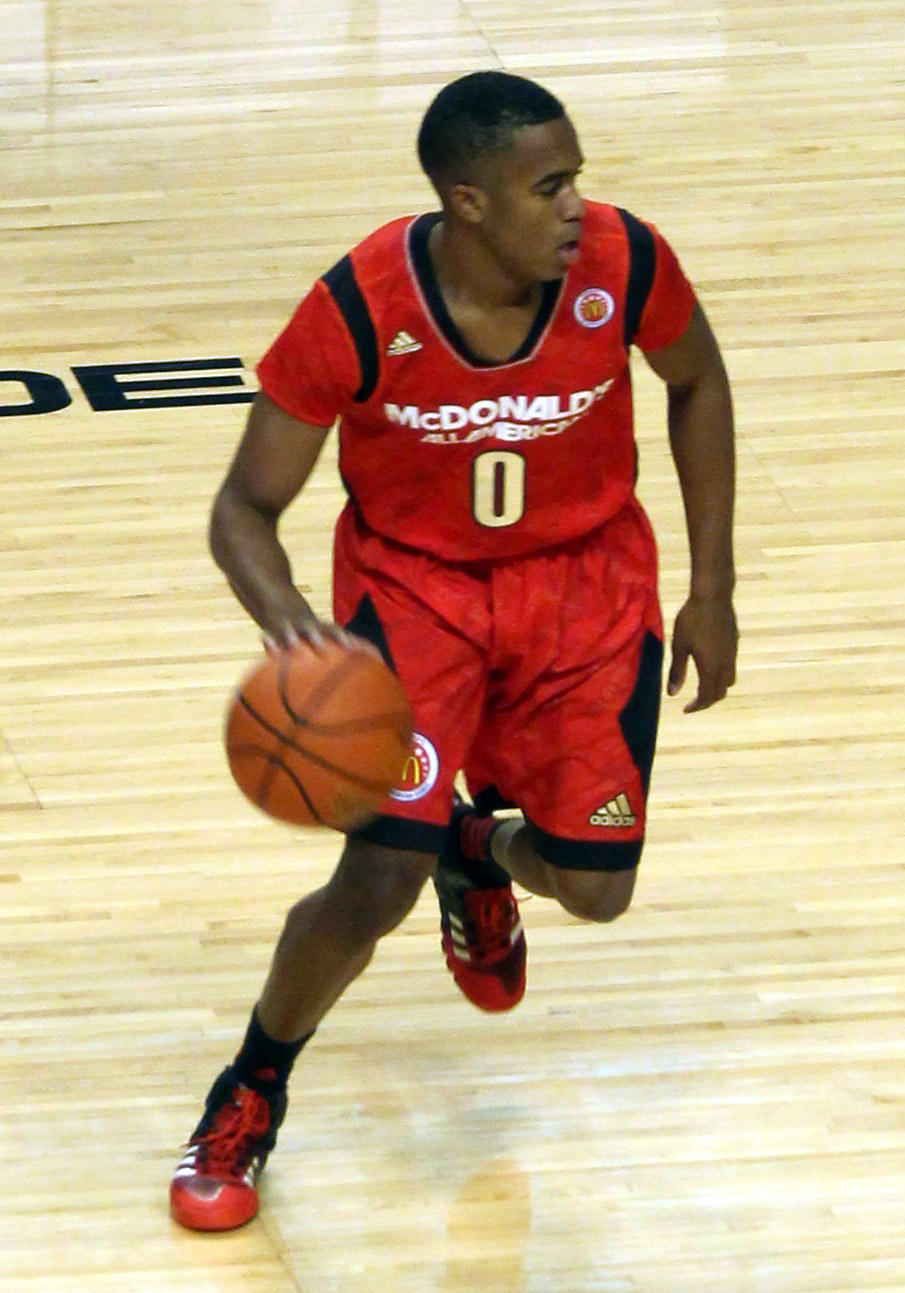
Kasey Hill

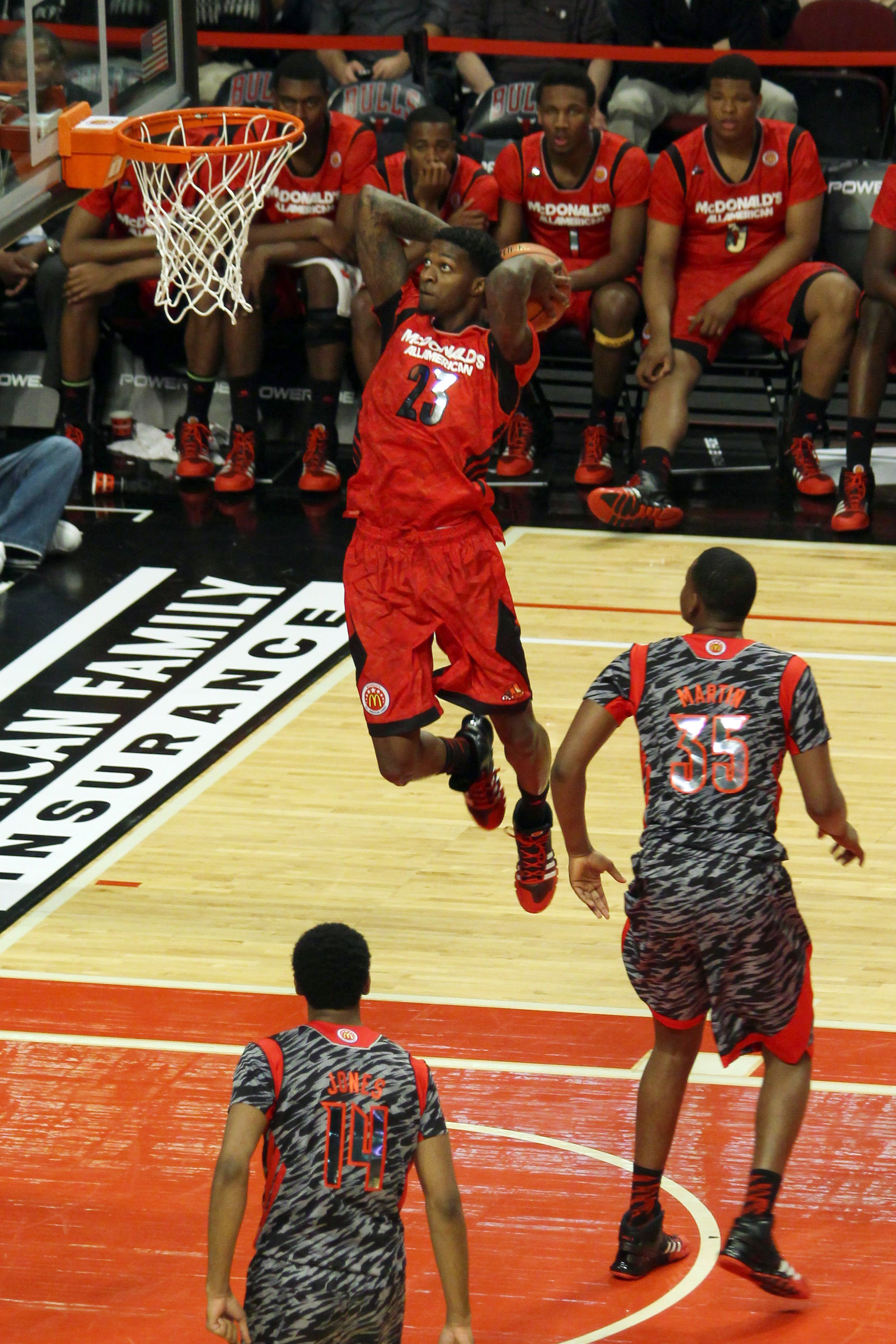
Chris Walker

2013–14 Florida Gators men's basketball team
Players
Coaches

Pos.	#	Name	Height	Weight	Year	Hometown
G	1	Eli Carter (redshirt)	6 ft 2 in (1.88 m)	200 lb (91 kg)	Jr	Paterson, New Jersey
G	42	Billy Donovan Jr. (W)	6 ft 2 in (1.88 m)	195 lb (88 kg)	RS Jr	Gainesville, Florida
G	11	Lexx Edwards (W)	6 ft 2 in (1.88 m)	225 lb (102 kg)	RS So	Orlando, Florida
F	10	Dorian Finney-Smith	6 ft 8 in (2.03 m)	212 lb (96 kg)	RS So	Portsmouth, Virginia
G	20	Michael Frazier II	6 ft 4 in (1.93 m)	199 lb (90 kg)	So	Tampa, Florida
G	12	Dillon Graham (redshirt)	6 ft 4 in (1.93 m)	186 lb (84 kg)	So	Orlando, Florida
G	0	Kasey Hill	6 ft 1 in (1.85 m)	181 lb (82 kg)	Fr	Eustis, Florida
G/F	30	Jacob Kurtz (W)	6 ft 6 in (1.98 m)	210 lb (95 kg)	Jr	Oviedo, Florida
SF	12	Alex Murphy (redshirt)	6 ft 9 in (2.06 m)	230 lb (104 kg)	So	Wakefield, Rhode Island
C	21	Zachary Pindar (W)	6 ft 10 in (2.08 m)	236 lb (107 kg)	RS Fr	Stony Point, New York
G/F	24	Casey Prather	6 ft 6 in (1.98 m)	212 lb (96 kg)	Sr	Jackson, Tennessee
F	23	Chris Walker	6 ft 10 in (2.08 m)	220 lb (100 kg)	Fr	Bonifay, Florida
G	5	Scottie Wilbekin	6 ft 2 in (1.88 m)	176 lb (80 kg)	Sr	Gainesville, Florida
F	15	Will Yeguete	6 ft 8 in (2.03 m)	230 lb (104 kg)	Sr	Bordeaux, France
C	4	Patric Young	6 ft 9 in (2.06 m)	240 lb (109 kg)	Sr	Jacksonville, Florida

Head coach

- Billy Donovan (18th year)

Assistant coach(es)

- Rashon Burno (2nd year)
- Matt McCall (3rd year)
- John Pelphrey (3rd year)

Legend

- (C) Team captain
- (S) Suspended
- (I) Ineligible
- (W) Walk-on
- Injured
- Current redshirt

Roster
Last update: January 27, 2014

NOTES

- Prior to the season, sophomore guard Braxton Ogbueze transferred to Charlotte.

=== Coaches ===
Name	Position	College	Graduating year
Billy Donovan	Head coach	Providence College	1987
Matt McCall	Associate Head Coach	University of Florida	2005
John Pelphrey	Assistant coach	University of Kentucky	1992
Rashon Burno	Assistant coach	DePaul University	2002
Darren Hertz	Assistant to the Head Coach	University of Florida	1997
Oliver Winterbone	Video Coordinator	Rutgers University	2005
Preston Greene	Strength and conditioning Coordinator	Clemson University	1999
Dave Werner	Athletic Trainer	Eastern Kentucky University	1991
Tom Williams	Academic Counselor	University of Florida	1978

== Team statistics ==
As of April 5, 2014.
Indicates team leader in specific category. (FG% leader = minimum 100 att.; 3P% leader = minimum 20 att.; FT% leader = minimum 50 att.)
Retrieved from Gatorzone.com

Name	PTS	PPG	FG %	3P %	FT %	AST	REB	BLK	STL
Billy Donovan Jr.	4	0.3	.000	.000	1.000	3	4	0	2
Lexx Edwards	0	0.0	.000	–	–	0	3	0	0
Dorian Finney-Smith	323	8.7	.370	.293	.643	76	247	16	16
Michael Frazier II	482	12.4	.461	.447	.842	43	137	7	43
Kasey Hill	176	5.5	.407	.143	.663	100	63	5	37
Jacob Kurtz	42	1.6	.630	–	.500	7	38	1	6
Casey Prather	511	13.8	.603	.400	.679	60	184	20	37
Chris Walker	34	1.9	.593	–	.286	1	24	8	2
DeVon Walker	85	2.4	.309	.302	.667	19	43	13	13
Scottie Wilbekin	447	13.1	.402	.390	.725	123	83	0	56
Will Yeguete	191	4.9	.436	.190	.663	45	201	7	37
Patric Young	429	11.0	.541	–	.596	30	240	41	25
Team	2727	69.9	.460	.359	.668	509	1385	118	274

== Schedule and results ==
Date time, TV	Rank^{#}	Opponent^{#}	Result	Record	Site (attendance) city, state
Exhibition
Nov. 1, 2013*; 7:00 p.m., GatorVision	No. 10	Florida Southern	W 110–88	–	O'Connell Center (7,523); Gainesville, FL
Regular season (non-conference play)
Nov. 8, 2013*; 3:00 p.m., Sun	No. 10	North Florida; Global Sports Challenge	W 77–69	1–0	O'Connell Center (10,550); Gainesville, FL
Nov. 12, 2013*; 9:00 p.m., ESPN2	No. 11	at No. 20 Wisconsin	L 53–59	1–1	Kohl Center (17,249); Madison, WI
Nov. 16, 2013*; 4:30 p.m., Sun	No. 11	Arkansas–Little Rock; Global Sports Challenge	W 86–56	2–1	O'Connell Center (8,843); Gainesville, FL
Nov. 18, 2013*; 7:00 p.m., Sun	No. 16	Southern; Global Sports Challenge	W 67–53	3–1	O'Connell Center (8,002); Gainesville, FL
Nov. 21, 2013*; 7:30 p.m., Sun	No. 16	Middle Tennessee; Global Sports Challenge	W 79–59	4–1	O'Connell Center (9,020); Gainesville, FL
Nov. 25, 2013*; 7:00 p.m., FSFL	No. 15	at Jacksonville	W 86–60	5–1	Veterans Memorial Arena (5,625); Jacksonville, FL
Nov. 29, 2013*; 7:30 p.m., ESPN2	No. 15	Florida State	W 67–66	6–1	O'Connell Center (12,306); Gainesville, FL
Dec. 2, 2013*; 7:00 p.m., ESPN2	No. 15	at No. 12 UConn	L 64–65	6–2	Gampel Pavilion (10,167); Storrs, CT
Dec. 10, 2013*; 7:00 p.m., ESPN	No. 19	No. 13 Kansas; Big 12/SEC Challenge	W 67–61	7–2	O'Connell Center (12,423); Gainesville, FL
Dec. 17, 2013*; 9:00 p.m., ESPN	No. 16	vs. No. 14 Memphis; Jimmy V Classic	W 77–75	8–2	Madison Square Garden (8,062); New York, NY
Dec. 21, 2013*; 4:30 p.m., Sun/FSN	No. 16	vs. Fresno State; Orange Bowl Basketball Classic	W 66–49	9–2	BB&T Center (11,214); Sunrise, FL
Dec. 29, 2013*; 3:00 p.m., Sun/FSN	No. 13	Savannah State	W 76–34	10–2	O'Connell Center (10,508); Gainesville, FL
Jan. 4, 2014*; 3:00 p.m., CSS	No. 12	Richmond	W 67–58	11–2	O'Connell Center (12,012); Gainesville, FL
Regular season (SEC conference play)
Jan. 8, 2014; 7:00 p.m., CSS	No. 10	South Carolina	W 74–58	12–2 (1–0)	O'Connell Center (12,147); Gainesville, FL
Jan. 11, 2014; 1:00 p.m., ESPN2	No. 10	at Arkansas	W 84–82 ^{OT}	13–2 (2–0)	Bud Walton Arena (18,040); Fayetteville, AR
Jan. 14, 2014; 7:00 p.m., ESPNU	No. 7	Georgia	W 72–50	14–2 (3–0)	O'Connell Center (12,051); Gainesville, FL
Jan. 18, 2014; 4:00 p.m., SEC TV	No. 7	at Auburn	W 68–61	15–2 (4–0)	Auburn Arena (8,683); Auburn, AL
Jan. 23, 2014; 7:00 p.m., ESPN2	No. 6	at Alabama	W 68–62	16–2 (5–0)	Coleman Coliseum (11,892); Tuscaloosa, AL
Jan. 25, 2014; 4:00 p.m., ESPN	No. 6	Tennessee	W 67–41	17–2 (6–0)	O'Connell Center (12,475); Gainesville, FL
Jan. 30, 2014; 7:00 p.m., ESPN2	No. 3	at Mississippi State	W 62–51	18–2 (7–0)	Humphrey Coliseum (7,989); Starkville, MS
Feb. 1, 2014; 4:00 p.m., SEC TV	No. 3	Texas A&M	W 69–36	19–2 (8–0)	O'Connell Center (12,426); Gainesville, FL
Feb. 4, 2014; 9:00 p.m., ESPN	No. 3	Missouri	W 68–58	20–2 (9–0)	O'Connell Center (12,123); Gainesville, FL
Feb. 8, 2014; 12:00 p.m., ESPN	No. 3	Alabama	W 78–69	21–2 (10–0)	O'Connell Center (12,520); Gainesville, FL
Feb. 11, 2014; 7:00 p.m., ESPN	No. 3	at Tennessee	W 67–58	22–2 (11–0)	Thompson–Boling Arena (18,009); Knoxville, TN
Feb. 15, 2014; 9:00 p.m., ESPN	No. 3	at No. 14 Kentucky; College GameDay	W 69–59	23–2 (12–0)	Rupp Arena (24,425); Lexington, KY
Feb. 19, 2014; 7:00 p.m., FSN	No. 2	Auburn	W 71–66	24–2 (13–0)	O'Connell Center (12,414); Gainesville, FL
Feb. 22, 2014; 12:00 p.m., CBS	No. 2	at Ole Miss	W 75–71	25–2 (14–0)	Tad Smith Coliseum (8,140); Oxford, MS
Feb. 25, 2014; 7:00 p.m., ESPN	No. 1	at Vanderbilt	W 57–54	26–2 (15–0)	Memorial Gymnasium (11,154); Nashville, TN
Mar. 1, 2014; 4:00 p.m., CBS	No. 1	LSU	W 79–61	27–2 (16–0)	O'Connell Center (12,589); Gainesville, FL
Mar. 4, 2014; 7:00 p.m., ESPNU	No. 1	at South Carolina	W 72–46	28–2 (17–0)	Colonial Life Arena (12,781); Columbia, SC
Mar. 8, 2014; 12:00 p.m., CBS	No. 1	No. 25 Kentucky	W 84–65	29–2 (18–0)	O'Connell Center (12,604); Gainesville, FL
SEC tournament
Mar. 14, 2014; 1:00 p.m., ESPNU	(1) No. 1	vs. (8) Missouri; Quarterfinals	W 72–49	30–2	Georgia Dome (15,273); Atlanta, GA
Mar. 15, 2014; 1:00 p.m., ABC	(1) No. 1	vs. (4) Tennessee; Semifinals	W 56–49	31–2	Georgia Dome (20,330); Atlanta, GA
Mar. 16, 2014; 3:15 p.m., ESPN	(1) No. 1	vs. (2) Kentucky; Championship game	W 61–60	32–2	Georgia Dome (21,021); Atlanta, GA
NCAA tournament
Mar. 20, 2014; 4:10 p.m., TBS	(1 S) No. 1	vs. (16 S) Albany; Second round	W 67–55	33–2	Amway Center (16,074); Orlando, FL
Mar. 22, 2014; 12:15 p.m., CBS	(1 S) No. 1	vs. (9 S) Pittsburgh; Third round	W 61–45	34–2	Amway Center (18,512); Orlando, FL
Mar. 27, 2014; 9:45 p.m., CBS	(1 S) No. 1	vs. (4 S) No. 20 UCLA; Sweet Sixteen	W 79–68	35–2	FedExForum (14,991); Memphis, TN
Mar. 29, 2014; 6:09 p.m., TBS	(1 S) No. 1	vs. (11 S) Dayton; Elite Eight	W 62–52	36–2	FedExForum (15,433); Memphis, TN
Apr. 5, 2014; 6:09 p.m., TBS	(1 S) No. 1	vs. (7 E) No. 18 UConn; Final Four	L 53–63	36–3	AT&T Stadium (79,444); Arlington, TX
*Non-conference game. ^{#}Rankings from AP poll. (#) Tournament seedings in parentheses. All times are in Eastern Time.

== Rankings ==
Ranking movement Legend: ██ Increase in ranking. ██ Decrease in ranking. NR = Not ranked. RV = Received votes.
Poll	Preseason	Wk 2 Nov. 11	Wk 3 Nov. 18	Wk 4 Nov. 25	Wk 5 Dec. 2	Wk 6 Dec. 9	Wk 7 Dec. 16	Wk 8 Dec. 23	Wk 9 Dec. 30	Wk 10 Jan. 6	Wk 11 Jan. 13	Wk 12 Jan. 20	Wk 13 Jan. 27	Wk 14 Feb. 3	Wk 15 Feb. 10	Wk 16 Feb. 17	Wk 17 Feb. 24	Wk 18 Mar. 3	Wk 19 Mar. 10	Wk 20 Mar. 17	Final
AP	10	11	16	15	15	19	16	13	12	10	7	6	3	3	3	2	1	1	1	1	N/A
Coaches	8	10	14	13	12	19	17	14	13	11	7	6	4	4	4	2	1	1	1	1	3
