= 2013–14 LSU Tigers basketball team =

American college basketball season

2013–14 LSU Tigers men's basketball

NIT, Second Round
- Conference: Southeastern Conference
- Record: 20–14 (9–9 SEC)
- Head coach: Johnny Jones (2nd season)
- Assistant coaches: Korey McCray; Charlie Leonard; David Patrick
- Home arena: Pete Maravich Assembly Center

2013–14 Southeastern Conference men's basketball standings
	Conf.				Overall
Team	W		L	PCT	W		L	PCT
No. 1 Florida †	18	–	0	1.000	36	–	3	.923
Kentucky	12	–	6	.667	29	–	11	.725
Georgia	12	–	6	.667	20	–	14	.588
Tennessee	11	–	7	.611	24	–	13	.649
Arkansas	10	–	8	.556	22	–	12	.647
Missouri	9	–	9	.500	23	–	12	.657
LSU	9	–	9	.500	20	–	14	.588
Ole Miss	9	–	9	.500	19	–	14	.576
Texas A&M	8	–	10	.444	18	–	16	.529
Vanderbilt	7	–	11	.389	15	–	16	.484
Alabama	7	–	11	.389	13	–	19	.406
Auburn	6	–	12	.333	14	–	16	.467
South Carolina	5	–	13	.278	14	–	20	.412
Mississippi State	3	–	15	.167	14	–	19	.424
† 2014 SEC tournament winner Rankings from AP poll

The 2013–14 LSU Tigers basketball team represented Louisiana State University during the 2013–14 NCAA Division I men's basketball season. The team's head coach was Johnny Jones, who was in his second season at LSU. They played their home games at Pete Maravich Assembly Center as members of the Southeastern Conference.

== Previous season and offseason ==
LSU completed the 2012–13 season with an overall record of 19–12 and a 9–9 record in Southeastern Conference play. After receiving a bye for the first round of the SEC tournament, the Tigers defeated the Georgia Bulldogs in the second round. They were eliminated by the Florida Gators, the SEC regular season champions, in the quarterfinals. LSU was not invited to any other postseason tournament.

The Tigers lost one of their top scorers with the departure of point guard Charles Carmouche. The team's leader in scoring and rebounding and first team all-SEC forward Johnny O'Bryant elected to return for his junior season. LSU's 2013 recruiting class was rated in the top ten by all major recruiting services and included Jarell Martin, considered by many to be one of the top high school basketball players in the country.

=== Departures ===
Name	Number	Pos.	Height	Weight	Year	Hometown	Notes
Charles Carmouche	0	G	6'4"	187	Senior	New Orleans, Louisiana	Graduated
Jalen Courtney	3	F	6'8"	228	Junior	Jackson, Mississippi	Transferred to Morehead State
Corban Collins	4	G	6'3"	192	Freshman	High Point, North Carolina	Transferred to Morehead State
Eddie Ludwig	13	F	6'9"	209	Senior	Metairie, Louisiana	Graduated
Andrew Del Piero	55	C	7'3"	254	Senior	Austin, Texas	Graduated

=== Recruits ===
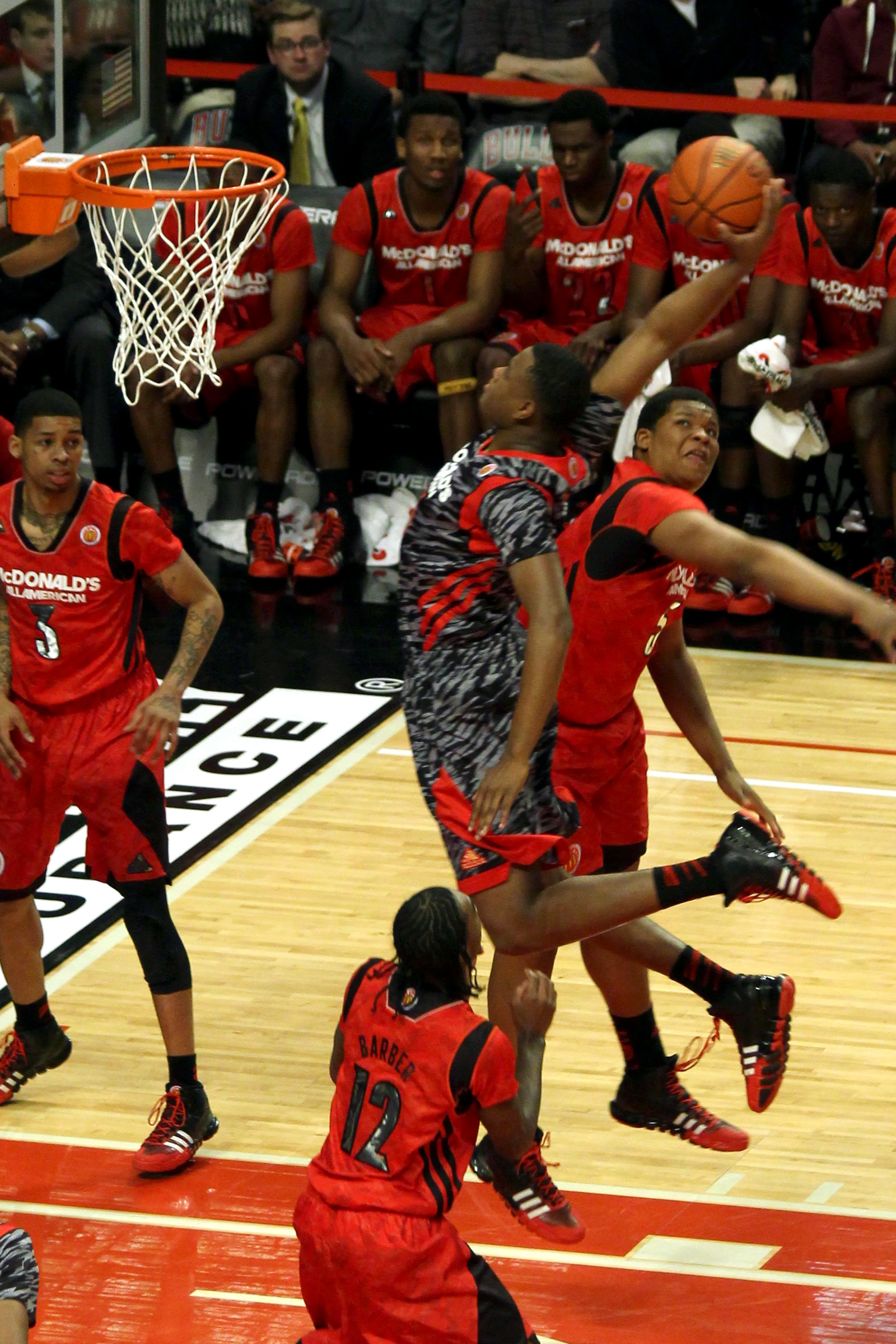
Jarell Martin in the 2013 McDonald's All-American Boys Game

College recruiting information
Name	Hometown	School	Height	Weight	Commit date
Brian Bridgewater; F	Baton Rouge, Louisiana	Scotlandville Magnet High School	6 ft 6 in (1.98 m)	225 lb (102 kg)	Apr 17, 2013
Brian Bridgewater; F	Recruit ratings: Scout: Rivals: ESPN:				
Darcy Malone; C	Canberra, Australia	Australian Institute of Sport	7 ft 0 in (2.13 m)	220 lb (100 kg)	Feb 7, 2013
Darcy Malone; C	Recruit ratings: Scout: Rivals: ESPN:				
Jarell Martin; F	Baton Rouge, Louisiana	Madison Preparatory Academy	6 ft 9 in (2.06 m)	218 lb (99 kg)	Nov 1, 2012
Jarell Martin; F	Recruit ratings: Scout: Rivals: ESPN:				
Jordan Mickey; F	Arlington, Texas	Prime Prep Academy	6 ft 7 in (2.01 m)	200 lb (91 kg)	Sep 27, 2012
Jordan Mickey; F	Recruit ratings: Scout: Rivals: ESPN:				
John Odo; C	Lagos, Nigeria	Hill College	6 ft 10 in (2.08 m)	230 lb (100 kg)	Sep 3, 2012
John Odo; C	Recruit ratings: Scout: Rivals: ESPN:				
Tim Quarterman; G	Savannah, Georgia	Sol C. Johnson High School	6 ft 5 in (1.96 m)	183 lb (83 kg)	Sep 30, 2012
Tim Quarterman; G	Recruit ratings: Scout: Rivals: ESPN:				
Overall recruit ranking: Scout: 9th Rivals: 10th ESPN: 9th
Note: In many cases, Scout, Rivals, 247Sports, On3, and ESPN may conflict in their listings of height and weight.; In these cases, the average was taken. ESPN grades are on a 100-point scale.; Sources: "LSU 2013 Basketball Commitments". Rivals.; "2013 LSU Basketball Commits". Scout.; "ESPN". ESPN.; "Scout.com Team Recruiting Rankings". Scout.; "2013 Team Ranking". Rivals.

== Roster ==
2013–14 LSU Tigers men's basketball team
Players
Coaches

Pos.	#	Name	Height	Weight	Year	Hometown
G	1	Anthony Hickey	5 ft 11 in (1.8 m)	182 lb (83 kg)	Jr	Hopkinsville, Kentucky
F	2	Johnny O'Bryant III	6 ft 9 in (2.06 m)	256 lb (116 kg)	Jr	Cleveland, Mississippi
G	3	Henry Shortess (W)	5 ft 9 in (1.75 m)	150 lb (68 kg)	Fr	Baton Rouge, Louisiana
G	4	Keith Hornsby (I) (redshirt)	6 ft 4 in (1.93 m)	190 lb (86 kg)	Jr	Williamsburg, Virginia
F	5	Shavon Coleman	6 ft 5 in (1.96 m)	195 lb (88 kg)	Sr	Thibodaux, Louisiana
G	10	Andre Stringer	5 ft 10 in (1.78 m)	190 lb (86 kg)	Sr	Jackson, Mississippi
F	11	Shane Hammink	6 ft 7 in (2.01 m)	217 lb (98 kg)	So	Millingen aan de Rijn, Netherlands
F	12	Jarell Martin	6 ft 9 in (2.06 m)	241 lb (109 kg)	Fr	Baton Rouge, Louisiana
F	20	Brian Bridgewater (I)	6 ft 6 in (1.98 m)	230 lb (104 kg)	Fr	Baton Rouge, Louisiana
C	22	Darcy Malone	7 ft 0 in (2.13 m)	229 lb (104 kg)	Fr	Canberra, Australia
G	24	Malik Morgan (injured)	6 ft 4 in (1.93 m)	199 lb (90 kg)	So	River Ridge, Louisiana
F	25	Jordan Mickey	6 ft 8 in (2.03 m)	220 lb (100 kg)	Fr	Arlington, Texas
F	31	John Odo	6 ft 9 in (2.06 m)	236 lb (107 kg)	Jr	Lagos, Nigeria
F	45	Brandon Eddlestone (W)	6 ft 8 in (2.03 m)	245 lb (111 kg)	Fr	Slidell, Louisiana
G	55	Tim Quarterman	6 ft 5 in (1.96 m)	180 lb (82 kg)	Fr	Savannah, Georgia

Head coach

- Johnny Jones (LSU)

Assistant coach(es)

- Charlie Leonard (Christian Brothers)
- David Patrick (Louisiana-Lafayette)
- Korey McCray (Mercer)

Legend

- (C) Team captain
- (S) Suspended
- (I) Ineligible
- (W) Walk-on
- Injured
- Current redshirt

Roster
Last update: 2013-08-21

== Schedule and results ==
Date time, TV	Rank^{#}	Opponent^{#}	Result	Record	High points	High rebounds	High assists	Site (attendance) city, state
Exhibition
Nov 6*; 7:00 pm, CST		Xavier (New Orleans)	W 80–45	–	22 – Stringer	11 – O'Bryant, Odo	6 – Quarterman	Maravich Center (3,029); Baton Rouge, LA
Non-conference regular season
Nov 12*; 10:00 am, ESPN2		at UMass; ESPN College Hoops Tip-Off Marathon	L 90–92	0–1	23 – O'Bryant	11 – O'Bryant	7 – Hickey	Mullins Memorial Center (5,182); Amherst, MA
Nov 16*; 7:00 pm		Northwestern State	W 88–74	1–1	21 – Stringer, O'Bryant	14 – O'Bryant	6 – Hickey	Maravich Center (8,756); Baton Rouge, LA
Nov 19*; 7:00 pm, CST		New Orleans	W 81–54	2–1	19 – Stringer	11 – O'Bryant, Mickey	5 – Quarterman	Maravich Center (7,513); Baton Rouge, LA
Nov 22*; 7:00 pm		Southeastern Louisiana	W 89–66	3–1	18 – O'Bryant	10 – O'Bryant	6 – Hickey	Maravich Center (8,404); Baton Rouge, LA
Nov 28*; 7:30 pm, ESPN2		vs. Saint Joseph's; Old Spice Classic – First round	W 82–65	4–1	18 – Stringer	10 – Mickey	6 – Stringer	HP Field House (2,351); Orlando, FL
Nov 29*; 4:30 pm, ESPN2		vs. No. 21 Memphis; Old Spice Classic – Semifinals	L 69–76	4–2	20 – Hickey	9 – O'Bryant	3 – Stringer	HP Field House (2,612); Orlando, FL
Dec 1*; 1:20 pm, ESPNU		vs. Butler; Old Spice Classic – 3rd place game	W 70–68 ^{OT}	5–2	17 – O'Bryant	8 – O'Bryant	5 – Stringer	HP Field House (2,016); Orlando, FL
Dec 14*; 7:00 pm, CST		Louisiana–Monroe	W 61–54	6–2	25 – Mickey	9 – Mickey	4 – Hickey	Maravich Center (7,623); Baton Rouge, LA
Dec 18*; 8:00 pm, ESPNU		at Texas Tech	W 71–69	7–2	16 – Hickey	6 – Mickey, Odo	4 – Hickey, Stringer	United Spirit Arena (5,985); Lubbock, TX
Dec 21*; 4:00 pm, CST		UAB	W 86–63	8–2	17 – O'Bryant	6 – Mickey, Morgan	9 – Quarterman	Maravich Center (8,418); Baton Rouge, LA
Dec 28*; 7:00 pm, CST		McNeese State	W 79–52	9–2	16 – O'Bryant, Coleman	10 – Martin	3 – Morgan, Quarterman	Maravich Center (8,796); Baton Rouge, LA
Jan 4*; 7:00 pm, CST		Rhode Island	L 70–74	9–3	21 – Mickey	6 – Stringer	7 – Stringer	Maravich Center (8,789); Baton Rouge, LA
SEC regular season
Jan 7; 6:00 pm, ESPN		Tennessee	L 50–68	9–4 (0–1)	14 – Mickey	7 – O'Bryant	4 – Stringer	Maravich Center (7,918); Baton Rouge, LA
Jan 11; 12:30 pm, SECN		at South Carolina	W 71–68	10–4 (1–1)	18 – Martin	7 – O'Bryant	4 – Morgan	Colonial Life Arena (12,071); Columbia, SC
Jan 15; 8:00 pm, CSS		at Ole Miss	L 74–88 ^{OT}	10–5 (1–2)	23 – Stringer	7 – Coleman, Martin	7 – Hickey	Tad Smith Coliseum (7,884); Oxford, MS
Jan 18; 8:00 pm, ESPNU		Vanderbilt	W 81–58	11–5 (2–2)	22 – O'Bryant	12 – O'Bryant	4 – Coleman	Maravich Center (9,716); Baton Rouge, LA
Jan 21; 6:00 pm, ESPNU		Missouri	W 77–71	12–5 (3–2)	19 – Coleman	13 – Mickey	3 – Hickey, Quarterman	Maravich Center (8,411); Baton Rouge, LA
Jan 25; 7:00 pm, ESPN2		at Alabama	L 80–82	12–6 (3–3)	18 – O'Bryant	6 – Martin, Mickey	6 – Stringer	Coleman Coliseum (12,601); Tuscaloosa, AL
Jan 28; 8:00 pm, ESPN		No. 11 Kentucky	W 87–82	13–6 (4–3)	29 – O'Bryant	9 – O'Bryant, Coleman	6 – Hickey	Maravich Center (12,124); Baton Rouge, LA
Feb 1; 4:00 pm, ESPNU		Arkansas	W 88–74	14–6 (5–3)	23 – O'Bryant	11 – Mickey	6 – Hickey	Maravich Center (10,925); Baton Rouge, LA
Feb 6; 6:00 pm, ESPN2		at Georgia	L 78–91	14–7 (5–4)	19 – Mickey, Stringer	8 – Mickey	5 – Stringer	Stegeman Coliseum (4,902); Athens, GA
Feb 8; 3:00 pm, SECN		Auburn	W 87–80	15–7 (6–4)	19 – O'Bryant	10 – O'Bryant, Mickey	7 – Stringer	Maravich Center (10,588); Baton Rouge, LA
Feb 12; 8:00 pm, CSS		at Texas A&M	L 73–83	15–8 (6–5)	21 – Coleman	7 – Mickey	6 – Hickey	Reed Arena (4,782); College Station, TX
Feb 15; 4:00 pm, ESPNU		at Arkansas	L 70–81	15–9 (6–6)	20 – O'Bryant	16 – O'Bryant	4 – Stringer	Bud Walton Arena (18,307); Fayetteville, AR
Feb 19; 7:00 pm, SECN		Mississippi State	W 92–81	16–9 (7–6)	20 – Martin	8 – Martin	5 – O'Bryant	Maravich Center (7,689); Baton Rouge, LA
Feb 22; 3:00 pm, ESPN		at No. 18 Kentucky	L 76–77 ^{OT}	16–10 (7–7)	20 – O'Bryant, Hickey	12 – O'Bryant	8 – Hickey	Rupp Arena (24,244); Lexington, KY
Feb 26; 7:00 pm, SECN		Texas A&M	W 68–49	17–10 (8–7)	20 – Martin	9 – O'Bryant	8 – Hickey	Maravich Center (7,689); Baton Rouge, LA
Mar 1; 3:00 pm, CBS		at No. 1 Florida	L 61–79	17–11 (8–8)	18 – O'Bryant	10 – Mickey	4 – Stringer	O'Connell Center (12,589); Gainesville, FL
Mar 6; 6:00 pm, ESPN2		at Vanderbilt	W 57–51	18–11 (9–8)	25 – O'Bryant	10 – O'Bryant	2 – Coleman, Hickey, Stringer	Memorial Gymnasium (9,968); Nashville, TN
Mar 8; 4:00 pm, FSN		Georgia	L 61–69	18–12 (9–9)	22 – Stringer	8 – O'Bryant, Mickey	2 – O'Bryant, Martin	Maravich Center (9,208); Baton Rouge, LA
SEC Tournament
Mar 13; 6:00 pm, SECN		vs. Alabama; Second round	W 68–56	19–12	15 – Coleman	11 – Mickey	8 – Hickey	Georgia Dome (N/A); Atlanta, GA
Mar 14; 6:00 pm, SECN		vs. Kentucky; Quarterfinals	L 67–85	19–13	18 – O'Bryant	13 – Mickey	4 – Hickey, Martin	Georgia Dome (N/A); Atlanta, GA
National Invitation Tournament
Mar 19*; 9:00 pm, ESPNU	No. (5)	at (4) San Francisco; First round	W 71–63 ^{-}	20–13	16 – Martin	8 – Mickey	3 – Coleman, Mickey, Hickey	War Memorial Gymnasium (3,662); San Francisco, CA
Mar 24*; 8:00 pm, ESPN	No. (5)	at (1) SMU; Second round	L 67–80	20–14	16 – O'Bryant	7 – Coleman, Martin, Mickey, O'Bryant	4 – Hickey	Moody Coliseum (7,021); University Park, TX
*Non-conference game. ^{#}Rankings from AP Poll, (#) during NIT is seed within region. (#) Tournament seedings in parentheses. All times are in Central Time.

== See also ==
- 2013–14 LSU Lady Tigers basketball team
