= 2013–14 Auburn Tigers men's basketball team =

American college basketball season

2013–14 Auburn Tigers men's basketball
- Conference: Southeastern Conference
- Record: 14–16 (6–12 SEC)
- Head coach: Tony Barbee (4th season)
- Associate head coach: Ryan Miller (2nd season)
- Assistant coaches: Tony Madlock; Milt Wagner
- Captains: Allen Payne; KT Harrell
- Home arena: Auburn Arena

2013–14 Southeastern Conference men's basketball standings
	Conf.				Overall
Team	W		L	PCT	W		L	PCT
No. 1 Florida †	18	–	0	1.000	36	–	3	.923
Kentucky	12	–	6	.667	29	–	11	.725
Georgia	12	–	6	.667	20	–	14	.588
Tennessee	11	–	7	.611	24	–	13	.649
Arkansas	10	–	8	.556	22	–	12	.647
Missouri	9	–	9	.500	23	–	12	.657
LSU	9	–	9	.500	20	–	14	.588
Ole Miss	9	–	9	.500	19	–	14	.576
Texas A&M	8	–	10	.444	18	–	16	.529
Vanderbilt	7	–	11	.389	15	–	16	.484
Alabama	7	–	11	.389	13	–	19	.406
Auburn	6	–	12	.333	14	–	16	.467
South Carolina	5	–	13	.278	14	–	20	.412
Mississippi State	3	–	15	.167	14	–	19	.424
† 2014 SEC tournament winner Rankings from AP poll

The 2013–14 Auburn Tigers men's basketball team represented Auburn University during the 2013–14 college basketball season. The team's head coach was Tony Barbee, in his fourth and final season at Auburn. The team played their home games at the Auburn Arena in Auburn, Alabama as a member of the Southeastern Conference.

== Before the season ==
=== Departures ===
Name	Number	Pos.	Height	Weight	Year	Hometown	Notes
Frankie Sullivan	23	G	6'1"	206	RS Senior	Uniontown, Alabama	Graduated
Dylan Spencer	4	G	6'4"	190	Senior	Birmingham, Alabama	Graduated
Josh Wallace	11	G	5'10"	170	Senior	Pensacola, Florida	Graduated
Noel Johnson	32	G	6'6"	200	Senior	Fayetteville, Georgia	Graduated
Rob Chubb	41	C	6'10"	242	Senior	Peachtree City, Georgia	Graduated
Brian Greene	24	G	6'3"	200	Freshman	Chicago	Transferred to Florida Gulf Coast
Jordan Price	10	G	6'5"	230	Freshman	Decatur, Georgia	Transferred to La Salle

=== Recruits ===
College recruiting
Name	Hometown	School	Height	Weight	Commit date
Tahj Shamsid-Deen; PG	Decatur, Georgia	Columbia	5 ft 9 in (1.75 m)	165 lb (75 kg)	Sep 13, 2012
Tahj Shamsid-Deen; PG	Recruit ratings: Scout: Rivals: (70)				
Matthew Atewe; C	Toronto, ON	Notre Dame Prep (MA)	6 ft 8 in (2.03 m)	230 lb (100 kg)	Mar 31, 2013
Matthew Atewe; C	Recruit ratings: Scout: Rivals: (66)				
Ronald Delph; C	Winter Haven, Florida	IMG Academy	7 ft 0 in (2.13 m)	230 lb (100 kg)	Nov 11, 2012
Ronald Delph; C	Recruit ratings: (65)				
Dion Wade; SF	Antwerp	Findlay Prep (NV)	6 ft 7 in (2.01 m)	180 lb (82 kg)	Feb 1, 2013
Dion Wade; SF	Recruit ratings: Scout: Rivals: (NR)				
Benas Griciunas; PF	Henderson, Nevada	Findlay Prep (Nevada)	6 ft 10 in (2.08 m)	200 lb (91 kg)	Nov 12, 2012
Benas Griciunas; PF	Recruit ratings: Scout: Rivals: (NR)				
Overall recruit ranking: Scout: Not Ranked Rivals: Not Ranked ESPN: Not Ranked
Note: In many cases, Scout, Rivals, 247Sports, On3, and ESPN may conflict in their listings of height and weight.; In these cases, the average was taken. ESPN grades are on a 100-point scale.; Sources: "Auburn 2013 Basketball Commitments". Rivals.; "2013 Auburn Basketball Commits". Scout.; "ESPN". ESPN.; "Scout.com Team Recruiting Rankings". Scout.; "2013 Team Ranking". Rivals.

== Season ==
=== Preseason ===
Head coach Tony Barbee announced the team's complete season schedule on August 30, 2013. The Tigers schedule to play three participants from the 2013 NCAA tournament, Northwestern State, Iowa State, and Illinois. The Tigers also scheduled to play host to ACC teams Clemson and Boston College. The SEC schedule was highlighted by the Tigers playing host to Florida, Kentucky, and Tennessee, while visiting LSU and Alabama.

The Tigers opened their season on October 28 with an exhibition game against NAIA opponent Victory. The fast-paced Tigers offense pulled out an easy victory, winning 109–67. Chris Denson led the Tigers with 21 points and highly touted freshman Tahj Shamsid-Deen scored 16 points in his first collegiate action. The Tigers finished off the preseason on November 1 by defeating Division II Paine College by a score of 99–64.

=== November ===
Auburn opened the regular season on November 8, hosting Nicholls State from the Southland Conference. KT Harrell, playing his first game as a Tiger after transferring from Virginia, led Auburn with 21 points to lead a 76–54 victory. The win snapped Auburn's ten game losing streak, dating back to the 2012–13 season. The Tigers welcomed their second straight Southland Conference opponent to Auburn Arena on November 15 as they hosted Northwestern State, a 2013 NCAA tournament participant. Auburn, led by Chris Denson's 29 points, jumped out to a nine-point halftime lead before the Demons exploded for 72 second-half points, leading to a 111–92 victory. Northwestern State, after going 0–17 in three point attempts in their season opener, shot 14–27 from beyond the arc.

Auburn closed out their five-game homestand by hosting three mid-major opponents in Jacksonville State, Murray State, and Tennessee State. The Gamecocks were the first to visit on November 19, falling to Auburn by a final score of 78–54. The Racers visited Auburn Arena on November 23 and fell to the Tigers by a score of 75–67 behind 23 points from Chris Denson. Lastly, Auburn faced the Tigers of Tennessee State, who entered the game winless at 0–6. Due to leading scorers KT Harrell and Chris Denson being in foul trouble, the Tigers struggled to pull away, but won thanks to the strength of freshman Tahj Shamsid-Deen, who had a career high 16 points in the 78–73 win.

=== December ===
The Tigers visited Hilton Coliseum in Ames, Iowa, on December 2 to take on the #17 Iowa State Cyclones as part of the Big 12/SEC Challenge. Despite 27 points from Denson, Auburn's cold-shooting from the field (35%) and a career game from Iowa State's Dustin Hogue (22 points, 16 rebounds), allowed the Cyclones to improve to 6–0 with a 99–70 win. Following the loss, Auburn traveled to Atlanta to take on Illinois on a neutral court. The Tigers once again struggled to shoot and were down 41–17 at halftime, but mounted a small comeback and lost by a final score of 81–62.

== Roster ==
2013–14 Auburn Tigers men's basketball team
Players
Coaches

Pos.	#	Name	Height	Weight	Year	Previous school	Hometown
C	0	Ashaun Dixon-Tatum	7 ft 0 in (2.13 m)	226 lb (103 kg)	Sr	Highland HS; Grand Valley State; Chattahoochee Tech	Anderson, Indiana
G	1	KT Harrell	6 ft 4 in (1.93 m)	216 lb (98 kg)	Jr	Brewbaker Tech; Virginia	Montgomery, Alabama
F	2	Allen Payne	6 ft 6 in (1.98 m)	225 lb (102 kg)	Sr	Winton Woods HS	Cincinnati
G	3	Chris Denson	6 ft 2 in (1.88 m)	181 lb (82 kg)	Sr	Shaw HS	Columbus, Georgia
G	11	Dion Wade	6 ft 5 in (1.96 m)	170 lb (77 kg)	Fr	Findlay Prep	Antwerp, Belgium
G	13	Tahj Shamsid-Deen	5 ft 10 in (1.78 m)	163 lb (74 kg)	Fr	Columbia HS	Decatur, Georgia
F	20	Alex Thompson	6 ft 8 in (2.03 m)	204 lb (93 kg)	Fr	Houston Academy	Dothan, Alabama
G	21	Malcolm Canada	6 ft 3 in (1.91 m)	224 lb (102 kg)	Jr	Akins HS; Ellsworth CC	Austin, Texas
G	22	C. J. Holmes (W)	6 ft 0 in (1.83 m)	191 lb (87 kg)	So	IMG Academy	Washington, D.C.
F	25	Jordon Granger	6 ft 8 in (2.03 m)	200 lb (91 kg)	So	McCluer North HS	St. Louis, Missouri
C	31	Benas Griciunas	7 ft 0 in (2.13 m)	225 lb (102 kg)	Fr	Findlay Prep	Šilutė, Lithuania
F	32	Chris Griffin	6 ft 7 in (2.01 m)	229 lb (104 kg)	Jr	Leon HS; Murray State; Wabash Valley College	Tallahassee, Florida
C	33	Ronald Delph	7 ft 0 in (2.13 m)	235 lb (107 kg)	Fr	IMG Academy	Winter Haven, Florida
C	41	Matthew Atewe	6 ft 9 in (2.06 m)	230 lb (104 kg)	Fr	Notre Dame Prep	Brampton, ON

Head coach

- Tony Barbee (UMass)

Assistant coach(es)

- Ryan Miller (Northern State)
- Tony Madlock (Memphis)
- Milt Wagner (Memphis)

Legend

- (C) Team captain
- (S) Suspended
- (I) Ineligible
- (W) Walk-on
- Injured
- Current redshirt

== Schedule and results ==
Date time, TV	Rank^{#}	Opponent^{#}	Result	Record	Site (attendance) city, state
Exhibition
10/28/2013*; 7:00 pm		Victory	W 109–67	–	Auburn Arena (3,051); Auburn, Alabama
11/1/2013*; 7:00 pm		Paine	W 99–64	–	Auburn Arena (3,661); Auburn, Alabama
Non-conference games
11/8/2013*; 7:00 pm		Nicholls State	W 76–54	1–0	Auburn Arena (4,196); Auburn, Alabama
11/15/2013*; 7:00 pm		Northwestern State	L 92–111	1–1	Auburn Arena (5,823); Auburn, Alabama
11/19/2013*; 7:00 pm		Jacksonville State	W 78–54	2–1	Auburn Arena (4,016); Auburn, Alabama
11/23/2013*; 7:00 pm		Murray State	W 75–67	3–1	Auburn Arena (4,171); Auburn, Alabama
11/26/2013*; 7:00 pm		Tennessee State	W 78–73	4–1	Auburn Arena (4,370); Auburn, Alabama
12/2/2013*; 6:00 pm, ESPNU		at No. 17 Iowa State; Big 12/SEC Challenge	L 70–99	4–2	Hilton Coliseum (13,889); Ames, Iowa
12/8/2013*; 2:00 pm, FSN		vs. Illinois	L 62–82	4–3	Philips Arena (2,259); Atlanta
12/19/2013*; 7:00 pm, FSN		Clemson	W 66–64	5–3	Auburn Arena (4,938); Auburn, Alabama
12/22/2013*; 1:00 pm, PPV		Boston College	W 77–67	6–3	Auburn Arena (4,622); Auburn, Alabama
12/30/2013*; 7:00 pm, PPV		Arkansas–Pine Bluff	W 91–59	7–3	Auburn Arena (4,467); Auburn, Alabama
1/4/2014*; 7:00 pm		Florida A&M	W 81–50	8–3	Auburn Arena (4,677); Auburn, Alabama
Conference games
1/9/2014; 6:00 pm, ESPN/2		at Ole Miss	L 62–65	8–4 (0–1)	Tad Smith Coliseum (6,355); Oxford, Mississippi
1/11/2014; 1:00 pm, ESPNU		No. 21 Missouri	L 68–70	8–5 (0–2)	Auburn Arena (7,181); Auburn, Alabama
1/15/2014; 6:00 pm, PPV		at Tennessee	L 67–78	8–6 (0–3)	Thompson–Boling Arena (14.205); Knoxville, Tennessee
1/18/2014; 3:00 pm, SECN		No. 7 Florida	L 61–68	8–7 (0–4)	Auburn Arena (8,683); Auburn, Alabama
1/22/2014; 7:00 pm, ESPN3		at Mississippi State	L 74–82	8–8 (0–5)	Humphrey Coliseum (7,754); Starkville, Mississippi
1/25/2014; 5:00 pm, FSN		at Arkansas	L 67–86	8–9 (0–6)	Bud Walton Arena (16,762); Fayetteville, Arkansas
1/30/2014^{[a]} 7:00 pm, SECN(ESPN3)		Alabama	W 74–55	9–9 (1–6)	Auburn Arena (9,102); Auburn, Alabama
2/1/2014; 12:30 pm, SECN		Georgia	W 74–67	10–9 (2–6)	Auburn Arena (7,168); Auburn, Alabama
2/5/2014; 6:00 pm, ESPN3		at South Carolina	W 79–74	11–9 (3–6)	Colonial Life Arena (8,581); Columbia, South Carolina
2/8/2014; 3:00 pm, SECN		at LSU	L 80–87	11–10 (3–7)	Maravich Center (10,588); Baton Rouge, Louisiana
2/12/2014; 7:00 pm, SECN		No. 14 Kentucky	L 56–64	11–11 (3–8)	Auburn Arena (7,959); Auburn, Alabama
2/15/2014; 12:30 pm, SECN		Mississippi State	W 92–82	12–11 (4–8)	Auburn Arena (6,890); Auburn, Alabama
2/19/2014; 6:00 pm, FSN		at No. 2 Florida	L 66–71	12–12 (4–9)	O'Connell Center (12,414); Gainesville, Florida
2/22/2014; 5:00 pm, FSN		Vanderbilt	L 59–67	12–13 (4–10)	Auburn Arena (6,814); Auburn, Alabama
2/26/2014; 8:00 pm, FSN		South Carolina	W 83–67	13–13 (5–10)	Auburn Arena (4,344); Auburn, Alabama
3/1/2014; 2:00 pm, ESPNU		at Alabama	L 57–73	13–14 (5–11)	Coleman Coliseum (13,499); Tuscaloosa, Alabama
3/5/2014; 7:00 pm, SECN		Tennessee	L 54–82	13–15 (5–12)	Auburn Arena (5,304); Auburn, Alabama
3/8/2014; 3:00 pm, SECN		at Texas A&M	W 69–64	14–15 (6–12)	Reed Arena; College Station, Texas
SEC Tournament
3/12/2014; 6:00 pm	No. (12)	vs. (13) South Carolina; First round	L 56–74	14–16	Georgia Dome; Atlanta
*Non-conference game. ^{#}Rankings from AP Poll, ( ) Tournament seedings in parentheses. (#) Tournament seedings in parentheses. All times are in Central Time.

NOTES:

^{^[a]}Game was originally scheduled for January 29, 2014, but was moved to January 30, 2014 (and broadcaster on ESPN3) due to snowy conditions across Alabama.

== See also ==
- 2013–14 Auburn Tigers women's basketball team
