= 2013–14 Mississippi State Bulldogs basketball team =

American college basketball season

2013–14 Mississippi State Bulldogs men's basketball
- Conference: Southeastern Conference
- Record: 14–19 (3–15 SEC)
- Head coach: Rick Ray (2nd season)
- Assistant coaches: George Brooks; Wes Flanigan; Chris Hollender
- Home arena: Humphrey Coliseum

2013–14 Southeastern Conference men's basketball standings
	Conf.				Overall
Team	W		L	PCT	W		L	PCT
No. 1 Florida †	18	–	0	1.000	36	–	3	.923
Kentucky	12	–	6	.667	29	–	11	.725
Georgia	12	–	6	.667	20	–	14	.588
Tennessee	11	–	7	.611	24	–	13	.649
Arkansas	10	–	8	.556	22	–	12	.647
Missouri	9	–	9	.500	23	–	12	.657
LSU	9	–	9	.500	20	–	14	.588
Ole Miss	9	–	9	.500	19	–	14	.576
Texas A&M	8	–	10	.444	18	–	16	.529
Vanderbilt	7	–	11	.389	15	–	16	.484
Alabama	7	–	11	.389	13	–	19	.406
Auburn	6	–	12	.333	14	–	16	.467
South Carolina	5	–	13	.278	14	–	20	.412
Mississippi State	3	–	15	.167	14	–	19	.424
† 2014 SEC tournament winner Rankings from AP poll

The 2013–14 Mississippi State Bulldogs basketball team represented Mississippi State University in the 2013–14 college basketball season. The team's head coach was Rick Ray, in his second season at Mississippi State. The team played their home games at the Humphrey Coliseum in Starkville, Mississippi, as a member of the Southeastern Conference.

== Before the season ==
=== Departures ===
The Bulldogs lost three players from the 2012–13 squad.

Name	Number	Pos.	Height	Weight	Year	Hometown	Notes
Jalen Steele	0	G	6'3"	194	Junior	Knoxville, Tennessee	Left team after injuries; intended to transfer to Middle Tennessee but never played
Wendell Lewis	5	C	6'9"	253	Senior	Selma, Alabama	Dismissed; Transferred to Alabama State
Baxter Price	15	G	5'9"	156	Senior	Brandon, Mississippi	Graduated (Walk-on)

=== Recruits ===
College recruiting
Name	Hometown	School	Height	Weight	Commit date
Travis Daniels; SF	Russellville, AL	Shelton State CC	6 ft 8 in (2.03 m)	205 lb (93 kg)	Oct 2, 2012
Travis Daniels; SF	Recruit ratings: Rivals:				
Fallou Ndoye; C	Henderson, NV	Findlay Prep	6 ft 11 in (2.11 m)	215 lb (98 kg)	Nov 13, 2012
Fallou Ndoye; C	Recruit ratings: Scout: Rivals: (69)				
I.J. Ready; PG	Little Rock, AR	Parkview	5 ft 10 in (1.78 m)	160 lb (73 kg)	May 10, 2012
I.J. Ready; PG	Recruit ratings: Scout: Rivals: (74)				
De'Runnya Wilson; SF	Birmingham, AL	Wenonah HS	6 ft 5 in (1.96 m)	215 lb (98 kg)	Jan 22, 2013
De'Runnya Wilson; SF	Recruit ratings: No ratings found				
Overall recruit ranking: Scout: Not Ranked Rivals: Not Ranked ESPN: Not Ranked
Note: In many cases, Scout, Rivals, 247Sports, On3, and ESPN may conflict in their listings of height and weight.; In these cases, the average was taken. ESPN grades are on a 100-point scale.; Sources: "Mississippi State 2013 Basketball Commitments". Rivals.; "2013 Mississippi State Basketball Commits". Scout.; "ESPN". ESPN.; "Scout.com Team Recruiting Rankings". Scout.; "2013 Team Ranking". Rivals.

== Season ==
=== Preseason ===
Head coach Rick Ray announced the Bulldogs' non-conference schedule on July 3, 2013. The Bulldogs scheduled to open the season at home against Prairie View A&M, with other notable non-conference games including a trip to Utah State, a home game against Florida Gulf Coast, and participating in the Las Vegas Classic. Ray announced the team's conference slate on August 20, 2013. The Bulldogs' SEC schedule was highlighted by a home-and-home series with Kentucky, including traveling to Rupp Arena to open conference play on January 8. Other notable games included a visit from Florida to Humphrey Coliseum and a road date at LSU.

On December 30, 2013 it was announced that guard Andre Applewhite would transfer.

=== Departures ===
Name	Number	Pos.	Height	Weight	Year	Hometown	Notes
Andre Applewhite	2	G	6'5"	217	Redshirt Freshman	Memphis, Tennessee	Transferred

== Roster ==
2013–14 Mississippi State Bulldogs men's basketball team
Players
Coaches

Pos.	#	Name	Height	Weight	Year	Previous school	Hometown
G	1	Fred Thomas	6 ft 5 in (1.96 m)	206 lb (93 kg)	So	Jim Hill HS	Jackson, MS
G	2	Andre Applewhite	6 ft 5 in (1.96 m)	217 lb (98 kg)	RS Fr	Central HS	Memphis, TN
F	3	Colin Borchert	6 ft 8 in (2.03 m)	231 lb (105 kg)	Sr	East Mississippi CC	Phoenix, AZ
G	4	Trivante Bloodman	6 ft 0 in (1.83 m)	182 lb (83 kg)	Jr	Olney Central College	Bronx, NY
G	10	Dallas Prater (W)	6 ft 3 in (1.91 m)	170 lb (77 kg)	Fr	St. Andrew's School	Jackson, MS
G	11	Jacoby Davis	6 ft 1 in (1.85 m)	191 lb (87 kg)	RS Fr	West Charlotte HS	Charlotte, NC
F	12	De'Runnya Wilson	6 ft 5 in (1.96 m)	215 lb (98 kg)	Fr	Wenonah HS	Birmingham, AL
G	13	Tevin Moore (W)	6 ft 3 in (1.91 m)	185 lb (84 kg)	Jr	Northwest Mississippi CC	Olive Branch, MS
G	15	I.J. Ready	5 ft 11 in (1.8 m)	170 lb (77 kg)	Fr	Parkview Magnet HS	Little Rock, AR
F	20	Gavin Ware	6 ft 9 in (2.06 m)	268 lb (122 kg)	So	Starkville HS	Starkville, MS
C	22	Fallou Ndoye (I) (redshirt)	6 ft 11 in (2.11 m)	215 lb (98 kg)	Fr	Findlay Prep	Henderson, NV
G	24	Tyson Cunningham (W)	6 ft 3 in (1.91 m)	197 lb (89 kg)	RS Sr	Columbus HS	Columbus, MS
F	25	Roquez Johnson	6 ft 7 in (2.01 m)	210 lb (95 kg)	Jr	G. W. Carver HS	Montgomery, AL
G	32	Craig Sword	6 ft 3 in (1.91 m)	194 lb (88 kg)	So	G. W. Carver HS	Montgomery, AL
G	33	Kyle Dobbs (W)	6 ft 6 in (1.98 m)	160 lb (73 kg)	Fr	Grayson HS	Grayson, GA
F	34	Travis Daniels (redshirt)	6 ft 8 in (2.03 m)	220 lb (100 kg)	So	Shelton State CC	Russellville, AL

Head coach

- Rick Ray (Grand View)

Assistant coach(es)

- George Brooks (Mississippi State)
- Wes Flanigan (Auburn)
- Chris Hollender (Evansville)

Legend

- (C) Team captain
- (S) Suspended
- (I) Ineligible
- (W) Walk-on
- Injured
- Current redshirt

== Schedule and results ==
Date time, TV	Rank^{#}	Opponent^{#}	Result	Record	Site (attendance) city, state
Non-conference games
11/8/2013*; 7:00 pm		Prairie View A&M	W 71–56	1–0	Humphrey Coliseum (6,853); Starkville, MS
11/14/2013*; 7:00 pm		Kennesaw State	W 78–55	2–0	Humphrey Coliseum (3,011); Starkville, MS
11/19/2013*; 7:00 pm		Mississippi Valley State	W 94–72	3–0	Humphrey Coliseum (6,759); Starkville, MS
11/23/2013*; 6:00 pm		at Utah State	L 68–87	3–1	Smith Spectrum (10,043); Logan, UT
11/27/2013*; 1:00 pm		Jackson State	W 58–56	4–1	Humphrey Coliseum (6,776); Starkville, MS
12/1/2013*; 1:00 pm		Loyola–Chicago	W 65–64 ^{OT}	5–1	Humphrey Coliseum (6,010); Starkville, MS
12/5/2013*; 6:00 pm, ESPNU		TCU; Big 12/SEC Challenge	L 61–71	5–2	Humphrey Coliseum (6,795); Starkville, MS
12/13/2013*; 7:00 pm		vs. Southeastern Louisiana	W 68–62	6–2	BancorpSouth Arena (2,035); Tupelo, MS
12/17/2013*; 7:00 pm		Florida A&M	W 78–65	7–2	Humphrey Coliseum (5,803); Starkville, MS
12/19/2013*; 7:00 pm		Florida Gulf Coast	W 66–53	8–2	Humphrey Coliseum (5,902); Starkville, MS
12/22/2013*; 7:00 pm		vs. South Florida; Las Vegas Classic	W 71–66	9–2	Orleans Arena (1,530); Paradise, NV
12/23/2013*; 7:00 pm, CBSSN		vs. UNLV; Las Vegas Classic	L 66–82	9–3	Orleans Arena (3,618); Paradise, NV
1/2/2014*; 7:00 pm		UMES	W 77–63	10–3	Humphrey Coliseum (5,708); Starkville, MS
Conference games
1/8/2014; 7:00 pm, SECN		at No. 14 Kentucky	L 63–85	10–4 (0–1)	Rupp Arena (23,638); Lexington, KY
1/11/2014; 3:00 pm, ESPNU		Ole Miss	W 76–72	11–4 (1–1)	Humphrey Coliseum (8,841); Starkville, MS
1/15/2014; 7:00 pm, SECN		at Alabama	L 61–80	11–5 (1–2)	Coleman Coliseum (10,112); Tuscaloosa, AL
1/18/2014; 11:30 am, SECN		Texas A&M	W 81–72 ^{OT}	12–5 (2–2)	Humphrey Coliseum (7,073); Starkville, MS
1/22/2014; 7:00 pm, ESPN3		Auburn	W 82–74	13–5 (3–2)	Humphrey Coliseum (7,754); Starkville, MS
1/25/2014; 3:00 pm, SECN		at Ole Miss	L 63–82	13–6 (3–3)	Tad Smith Coliseum (8,843); Oxford, MS
1/30/2014; 6:00 pm, ESPN2		No. 3 Florida	L 51–62	13–7 (3–4)	Humphrey Coliseum (7,989); Starkville, MS
2/1/2014; 4:00 pm, FSN		at Vanderbilt	L 49–55	13–8 (3–5)	Memorial Gymnasium (9,170); Nashville, TN
2/5/2014; 8:00 pm, CSS		at Texas A&M	L 52–72	13–9 (3–6)	Reed Arena (4,626); College Station, TX
2/8/2014; 12:30 pm, SECN		No. 18 Kentucky	L 59–69	13–10 (3–7)	Humphrey Coliseum (8,417); Starkville, MS
2/12/2014; 8:00 pm, FSN		Georgia	L 55–75	13–11 (3–8)	Humphrey Coliseum (7,010); Starkville, MS
2/15/2014; 12:30 pm, SECN		at Auburn	L 82–92	13–12 (3–9)	Auburn Arena (6,890); Aurbun, AL
2/19/2014; 7:00 pm, SECN		at LSU	L 81–92	13–13 (3–10)	Pete Maravich Assembly Center (7,689); Baton Rouge, LA
2/22/2014; 3:00 pm, SECN		Arkansas	L 69–73	13–14 (3–11)	Humphrey Coliseum (6,981); Starkville, MS
2/26/2014; 7:00 pm, SECN		Tennessee	L 68–75	13–15 (3–12)	Humphrey Coliseum (6,161); Starkville, MS
3/1/2014; 12:30 pm, SECN		at Missouri	L 66–85	13–16 (3–13)	Mizzou Arena (9,403); Columbia, MO
3/5/2014; 6:00 pm, CSS		at Georgia	L 45–66	13–17 (3–14)	Stegeman Coliseum (5,165); Athens, GA
3/8/2014; 3:00 pm, SECN		South Carolina	L 62–74	13–18 (3–15)	Humphrey Coliseum (6,105); Starkville, MS
SEC tournament
3/12/2014; 8:30 pm		vs. Vanderbilt; First round	W 82–68	14–18	Georgia Dome (7,132); Atlanta, GA
3/13/2014; 9:30 pm		vs. Ole Miss; Second round	L 66–78	14–19	Georgia Dome; Atlanta, GA
*Non-conference game. ^{#}Rankings from AP Poll. (#) Tournament seedings in parentheses. All times are in Central Time.
