= 2014 SEC men's basketball tournament =

Annual college basketball tournament

- Classification: Division I
- Season: 2013–14
- Teams: 14
- Site: Georgia Dome; Atlanta, Georgia
- Champions: Florida (4th title)
- Winning coach: Billy Donovan (4th title)
- MVP: Scottie Wilbekin (Florida)
- Attendance: 183,665
- Television: ABC, ESPN, ESPNU, SEC TV

2013–14 Southeastern Conference men's basketball standings
	Conf.				Overall
Team	W		L	PCT	W		L	PCT
No. 1 Florida †	18	–	0	1.000	36	–	3	.923
Kentucky	12	–	6	.667	29	–	11	.725
Georgia	12	–	6	.667	20	–	14	.588
Tennessee	11	–	7	.611	24	–	13	.649
Arkansas	10	–	8	.556	22	–	12	.647
Missouri	9	–	9	.500	23	–	12	.657
LSU	9	–	9	.500	20	–	14	.588
Ole Miss	9	–	9	.500	19	–	14	.576
Texas A&M	8	–	10	.444	18	–	16	.529
Vanderbilt	7	–	11	.389	15	–	16	.484
Alabama	7	–	11	.389	13	–	19	.406
Auburn	6	–	12	.333	14	–	16	.467
South Carolina	5	–	13	.278	14	–	20	.412
Mississippi State	3	–	15	.167	14	–	19	.424
† 2014 SEC tournament winner Rankings from AP poll

The 2014 SEC men's basketball tournament was the postseason men's basketball tournament for the Southeastern Conference (SEC) held from March 12–16, 2014 in Atlanta at the Georgia Dome. The tournament winner, Florida, received the SEC's automatic bid to the 2014 NCAA men's basketball tournament. However, like most major NCAA Division I conference tournaments, the SEC Tournament does not determine the official conference champion, since the SEC has awarded its men's basketball championship to the team or teams with the best regular season record since the 1950–51 season. Florida, the #1 seed, beat #2 seed Kentucky in the championship game 61–60, with Florida stopping Kentucky from making a last second game-winning shot.

== Seeds ==
Seed	School	Conference	Overall	Tiebreaker
1	Florida‡	18–0	32–2	
2	Kentucky†	12–6	24–10	1–0 vs. Georgia
3	Georgia†	12–6	18–13	0–1 vs. Kentucky
4	Tennessee†	11–7	21–12	
5	Arkansas#	10–8	21–11	
6	Ole Miss#	9–9	19–14	2–0 vs. LSU and Missouri
7	LSU#	9–9	19–13	1–1 vs. Ole Miss and Missouri
8	Missouri#	9–9	22–11	0–2 vs. Ole Miss and LSU
9	Texas A&M#	8–10	17–15	
10	Alabama#	7–11	13–19	1–0 vs. Vanderbilt
11	Vanderbilt	7–11	15–16	0–1 vs. Alabama
12	Auburn	6–12	14–16	
13	South Carolina	5–13	14–20	
14	Mississippi State	3–15	14–19	
‡ – SEC regular season champions, and tournament No. 1 seed. † – Received a double-bye in the conference tournament. # – Received a single-bye in the conference tournament. Overall records include all games played in the SEC Tournament.

== Schedule ==
Game	Time*	Matchup^{#}	Television	Attendance
First round – Wednesday, March 12
1	7:00 pm	#12 Auburn vs. #13 South Carolina	SEC TV	7,132
2	9:30 pm	#11 Vanderbilt vs. #14 Mississippi State	SEC TV	7,132
Second round – Thursday, March 13
3	1:00 pm	#8 Missouri vs. #9 Texas A&M	SEC TV	9,308
4	4:23 pm	#5 Arkansas vs. #13 South Carolina	SEC TV	9,308
5	7:10 pm	#7 LSU vs. #10 Alabama	SEC TV	
6	9:25 pm	#6 Ole Miss vs. #14 Mississippi State	SEC TV	
Quarterfinals – Friday, March 14
7	1:00 pm	#1 Florida vs. #8 Missouri	ESPNU	15,273
8	3:30 pm	#4 Tennessee vs. #13 South Carolina	ESPNU	15,273
9	7:00 pm	#2 Kentucky vs. #7 LSU	SEC TV	19,056
10	9:45 pm	#3 Georgia vs. #6 Ole Miss	SEC TV	19,056
Semifinals – Saturday, March 15
11	1:00 pm	#1 Florida vs. #4 Tennessee	ABC	20,330
12	3:30 pm	#2 Kentucky vs. #3 Georgia	ABC	20,330
Championship – Sunday, March 16
13	3:15 pm	#1 Florida vs. #2 Kentucky	ESPN	21,021
*Game times in ET. # – Rankings denote tournament seed

== Bracket ==
First round Wednesday, March 12
12	Auburn	56
13	South Carolina	74
11	Vanderbilt	68
14	Mississippi State	82

Second round Thursday, March 13
8	Missouri	91**
9	Texas A&M	83
13	South Carolina	71
5	Arkansas	69
7	LSU	68
10	Alabama	56
14	Mississippi State	66
6	Ole Miss	78

Quarterfinals; Friday, March 14
8	Missouri	49
1	#1 Florida	72
13	South Carolina	44
4	Tennessee	59
7	LSU	67
2	Kentucky	85
6	Ole Miss	73
3	Georgia	75

Semifinals; Saturday, March 15
1	#1 Florida	56
4	Tennessee	49
2	Kentucky	70
3	Georgia	58

Championship; Sunday, March 16
1	#1 Florida	61
2	Kentucky	60

* denote overtime period

== Game statistics ==
=== First round ===
SEC TV

March 12
7:00 pm EDT

Recap

South Carolina Gamecocks 74, Auburn Tigers 56
Scoring by half: 38–26, 36–30
Pts: D. Notice, 23; Rebs: M. Kacinas, 10; Asts: M. Kacinas, 3	Pts: C. Denson, 14; Rebs: K. Harrell, 5 Asts: K. Harrell. 2

Georgia Dome
Attendance: 7,132
Referees: Tony Greene, Joe Lindsay, Antinio Petty

SEC TV

March 12
9:35 pm EDT

Recap

Mississippi State Bulldogs 82, Vanderbilt Commodores 68
Scoring by half: 36–31, 46–37
Pts: C. Sword, 20; Rebs: I. Ready, 6 Asts: C. Sword, 6	Pts: D. Jones, 16; Rebs: J. Siakam, 5 Asts: Tied, 3

Georgia Dome
Attendance: 7,132
Referees: Doug Shows, Anthony Jordan, John Hampton

=== Second round ===
SEC TV

March 13
1:00 pm EDT

Recap

Texas A&M Aggies 83, Missouri Tigers 91
Scoring by half: 34–26, 57–57
Pts: A. Caruso, 28; Rebs: A. Caruso, 8 Asts: A. Caruso, 7	Pts: J. Brown, 26; Rebs: J. Williams, 15; Asts: J. Williams, 4

Georgia Dome
Attendance: 9,308
Referees: Antonio Petty, Mike Nance, Tony Henderson

SEC TV

March 13
4:25 pm EDT

Recap

South Carolina Gamecocks 71, Arkansas Razorbacks 69
Scoring by half: 35–32, 36–37
Pts: S. Thornwell, 17; Rebs: M. Kacinas, 10; Asts: D. Notice, 3	Pts: C. Clarke, 13; Rebs: C. Clarke, 5 Asts: R. Madden, 4

Georgia Dome
Attendance: 9,308
Referees: Pat Adams, Ron Groover, James Barker

SEC TV

March 13
7:11 pm EDT

Recap

Alabama Crimson Tide 56, LSU Tigers 68
Scoring by half: 24–35, 32–33
Pts: Tied, 11; Rebs: L. Randolph, 6 Asts: T. Releford, 3	Pts: S. Coleman, 15; Rebs: J. Mickey, 11; Asts: A. Hickey, 8

Georgia Dome
Attendance: 9,308
Referees: Anthony Jordan, John Hampton, Pat Evans

SEC TV

March 13
9:35 pm EDT

Recap

Mississippi State Bulldogs 66, Ole Miss Rebels 78
Scoring by half: 44–35, 22–43
Pts: Tied, 16; Rebs: G. Ware, 10; Asts: Tied, 3	Pts: Tied, 21; Rebs: D. Cox, 6 Asts: J. Summers, 6

Georgia Dome
Attendance: 9,308
Referees: Joe Lindsay, Lee Cassell, Brian Shey

=== Quarterfinals ===
ESPNU

March 14
1:00 pm EDT

Recap

Missouri Tigers 49, Florida Gators 72
Scoring by half: 29–29, 20–43
Pts: J. Brown, 18; Rebs: J. Brown, 5 Asts: Tied, 2	Pts: Tied, 15; Rebs: D. Finney-Smith, 9 Asts: K. Hill, 5

Georgia Dome
Attendance: 15,273
Referees: Tony Greene, Antinio Petty, Lee Cassell

ESPNU

March 14
3:25 pm EDT

Recap

South Carolina Gamecocks 44, Tennessee Volunteers 59
Scoring by half: 18–28, 26–31
Pts: B. Williams, 9 Rebs: M. Carrera, 8 Asts: D. Notice, 5	Pts: J. Stokes, 22; Rebs: J. Stokes, 15; Asts: J. McRae, 3

Georgia Dome
Attendance: 15,273
Referees: Mike Nance, Anthony Jordan, Tony Henderson

SEC TV

March 14
7:00 pm EDT

Recap

LSU Tigers 67, Kentucky Wildcats 85
Scoring by half: 32–42, 35–43
Pts: J. O'Bryant, 18; Rebs: J. Mickey, 13; Asts: Tied, 4	Pts: J. Young, 21; Rebs: J. Randle, 16; Asts: An. Harrison, 8

Georgia Dome
Attendance: 19,056
Referees: Doug Shows, Joe Lindsay, Glenn Tuitt

SEC TV

March 14
9:25 pm EDT

Recap

Ole Miss Rebels 73, Georgia Bulldogs 75
Scoring by half: 38–36, 35–39
Pts: J. Summers, 26; Rebs: M. Newby, 10; Asts: Tied, 3	Pts: C. Mann, 16; Rebs: M. Thornton, 11; Asts: J. Frazier, 3

Georgia Dome
Attendance: 19,056
Referees: Pat Adams, Ron Groover, Pat Evans

=== Semifinals ===
ABC

March 15
1:00 pm EDT

Recap

Tennessee Volunteers 49, Florida Gators 56
Scoring by half: 35–28, 14–28
Pts: J. McRae, 15; Rebs: J. Maymon, 9 Asts: A. Barton, 3	Pts: P. Young, 16; Rebs: P. Young, 8 Asts: C. Prather, 5

Georgia Dome
Attendance: 20,330
Referees: Doug Shows, Pat Adams, Joe Lindsay

ABC

March 15
3:40 pm EDT

Recap

Georgia Bulldogs 58, Kentucky Wildcats 70
Scoring by half: 32–36, 26–34
Pts: K. Gaines, 13; Rebs: M. Thornton, 6 Asts: B. Morris, 2	Pts: Aa. Harrison, 22; Rebs: J. Randle, 11; Asts: An. Harrison, 9

Georgia Dome
Attendance: 20,330
Referees: Tony Greene, Mike Nance, Lee Cassell

=== Championship game ===
ESPN

March 16
3:15 pm EDT

Recap

Florida Gators 61, Kentucky Wildcats 60
Scoring by half: 40–30, 21–30
Pts: Tied, 14; Rebs: W. Yeguete, 7 Asts: S. Wilbekin, 6	Pts: Aa. Harrison, 16; Rebs: W. Cauley-Stein, 11; Asts: Tied, 2

Georgia Dome
Attendance: 21,021
Referees: Tony Greene, Doug Shows, Ron Groover
