= 2013–14 Ole Miss Rebels men's basketball team =

American college basketball season

2013–14 Ole Miss Rebels men's basketball
- Conference: Southeastern Conference
- Record: 19–14 (9–9 SEC)
- Head coach: Andy Kennedy (8th season)
- Assistant coaches: Sergio Rouco; Al Pinkins; Bill Armstrong
- Home arena: Tad Smith Coliseum

2013–14 Southeastern Conference men's basketball standings
	Conf.				Overall
Team	W		L	PCT	W		L	PCT
No. 1 Florida †	18	–	0	1.000	36	–	3	.923
Kentucky	12	–	6	.667	29	–	11	.725
Georgia	12	–	6	.667	20	–	14	.588
Tennessee	11	–	7	.611	24	–	13	.649
Arkansas	10	–	8	.556	22	–	12	.647
Missouri	9	–	9	.500	23	–	12	.657
LSU	9	–	9	.500	20	–	14	.588
Ole Miss	9	–	9	.500	19	–	14	.576
Texas A&M	8	–	10	.444	18	–	16	.529
Vanderbilt	7	–	11	.389	15	–	16	.484
Alabama	7	–	11	.389	13	–	19	.406
Auburn	6	–	12	.333	14	–	16	.467
South Carolina	5	–	13	.278	14	–	20	.412
Mississippi State	3	–	15	.167	14	–	19	.424
† 2014 SEC tournament winner Rankings from AP poll

The 2013–14 Ole Miss Rebels men's basketball team represented the University of Mississippi in the 2013–14 college basketball season. The team's head coach was Andy Kennedy, in his eighth season at Ole Miss. The team played their home games at the Tad Smith Coliseum in Oxford, Mississippi as a member of the Southeastern Conference.

== Before the season ==
=== Departures ===
Name	Number	Pos.	Height	Weight	Year	Hometown	Notes
Nick Williams	20	G	6'4"	210	RS Senior	Mobile, Alabama	Graduated
Murphy Holloway	31	F	6'7"	240	RS Senior	Irmo, South Carolina	Graduated
Reginald Buckner	23	F	6'9"	225	Senior	Memphis, Tennessee	Graduated
Jason Carter	2	F	6'8"	230	Junior	Houston, Texas	Transferred to Arkansas State

=== Recruits ===
College recruiting information
Name	Hometown	School	Height	Weight	Commit date
Dwight Coleby; C	Piney Woods, MS	Piney Woods	6 ft 9 in (2.06 m)	220 lb (100 kg)	Oct 14, 2012
Dwight Coleby; C	Recruit ratings: Scout: Rivals: (77)				
Sebastian Saiz; C	Bel Aire, KS	Sunrise Christian	6 ft 9 in (2.06 m)	225 lb (102 kg)	Nov 1, 2012
Sebastian Saiz; C	Recruit ratings: Scout: Rivals: (66)				
Janari Jõesaar; SF	Bel Aire, KS	Sunrise Christian	6 ft 6 in (1.98 m)	180 lb (82 kg)	Nov 1, 2012
Janari Jõesaar; SF	Recruit ratings: Scout: Rivals: (NR)				
Overall recruit ranking: Scout: Not Ranked Rivals: Not Ranked ESPN: Not Ranked
Note: In many cases, Scout, Rivals, 247Sports, On3, and ESPN may conflict in their listings of height and weight.; In these cases, the average was taken. ESPN grades are on a 100-point scale.; Sources: "Ole Miss 2013 Basketball Commitments". Rivals.; "2013 Ole Miss Basketball Commits". Scout.; "ESPN". ESPN.; "Scout.com Team Recruiting Rankings". Scout.; "2013 Team Ranking". Rivals.

== Season ==
=== Preseason ===
Ole Miss made headlines on July 10, 2013, when the team indefinitely suspended their leading scorer from 2012 to 2013, the enigmatic Marshall Henderson. Henderson was the 2013 SEC Tournament MVP and averaged 20.1 points per game in 2012–13, but had well-documented issues with partying, drugs, and other general inappropriate behavior. In August 2013, Henderson was cleared to return to class by Ole Miss.

Head coach Andy Kennedy announced the Rebels' full season schedule on August 20, 2013. Key non-conference games included a trip to the Barclays Center Classic, as well as games against 2013 NCAA Tournament participants Kansas State, Oregon and Middle Tennessee. Conference play was highlighted by a home-and-home series with Kentucky, as well as visits to Tad Smith Coliseum from Florida, LSU, and Alabama.

The Rebels opened the season with one exhibition game against USC-Aiken on November 1. Ole Miss struggled their way to a 5-point win in overtime, led by Derrick Millinghaus who had 15 points.

=== November ===
Ole Miss opened the regular season on November 8 at home against Troy. Led by 28 points by Jarvis Summers, the Rebels brought a 13-point lead into halftime and coasted to a 69–54 victory.

== Roster ==
2013–14 Ole Miss Rebels men's basketball team
Players
Coaches

Pos.	#	Name	Height	Weight	Year	Previous school	Hometown
G	0	Jerron Martin	6 ft 1 in (1.85 m)	165 lb (75 kg)	Fr	Princeton Day School	Prince George's County, MD
G	1	Martavious Newby	6 ft 3 in (1.91 m)	210 lb (95 kg)	So	Booker T. Washington HS	Memphis, TN
G	3	Derrick Millinghaus	5 ft 10 in (1.78 m)	172 lb (78 kg)	So	Believe Prep	Schenectady, NY
C	4	Demarco Cox	6 ft 8 in (2.03 m)	276 lb (125 kg)	Jr	Yazoo City HS	Yazoo City, MS
G	5	Cade Peeper	6 ft 2 in (1.88 m)	185 lb (84 kg)	So	Collierville HS	Collierville, TN
G	10	LaDarius White	6 ft 6 in (1.98 m)	211 lb (96 kg)	Jr	McComb HS	McComb, MS
F	11	Sebastian Saiz	6 ft 9 in (2.06 m)	233 lb (106 kg)	Fr	Sunrise Christian Academy	Madrid, Spain
F	13	Anthony Pérez	6 ft 9 in (2.06 m)	213 lb (97 kg)	So	Word of Life Traditional School	Cumaná, Venezuela
G	21	Will Norman	6 ft 5 in (1.96 m)	213 lb (97 kg)	RS Jr	St. Thomas More HS	Lafayette, LA
G	22	Marshall Henderson	6 ft 2 in (1.88 m)	177 lb (80 kg)	Sr	L. D. Bell HS; Utah; Texas Tech; South Plains College	Hurst, TX
C	23	Dwight Coleby	6 ft 9 in (2.06 m)	236 lb (107 kg)	Fr	Piney Woods HS	Piney Woods, MS
F	24	Janari Jõesaar	6 ft 6 in (1.98 m)	208 lb (94 kg)	Fr	Sunrise Christian Academy	Tartu, Estonia
F	25	Terry Brutus	6 ft 6 in (1.98 m)	237 lb (108 kg)	So	Massanutten Military Academy	Spring Valley, NY
G	32	Jarvis Summers	6 ft 3 in (1.91 m)	186 lb (84 kg)	Jr	Provine HS	Jackson, MS
F	34	Aaron Jones	6 ft 9 in (2.06 m)	220 lb (100 kg)	Jr	Gautier HS	Gautier, MS

Head coach

- Andy Kennedy (UAB)

Assistant coach(es)

- Sergio Rouco (Nova Southeastern)
- Al Pinkins (NC State)
- Bill Armstrong (UAB)

Legend

- (C) Team captain
- (S) Suspended
- (I) Ineligible
- (W) Walk-on
- Injured
- Current redshirt

== Schedule and results ==
Date time, TV	Rank^{#}	Opponent^{#}	Result	Record	Site (attendance) city, state
Exhibition
11/1/2013*; 6:00 pm		USC-Aiken	W 75–70 ^{OT}	0–0	Tad Smith Coliseum (N/A); Oxford, MS
Non-conference games
11/8/2013*; 7:30 pm		Troy	W 69–54	1–0	Tad Smith Coliseum (6,809); Oxford, MS
11/16/2013*; 6:00 pm		at Coastal Carolina	W 72–70	2–0	HTC Center (3,241); Conway, SC
11/22/2013*; 7:30 pm		Mississippi Valley State; Barclays Center Classic	W 111–82	3–0	Tad Smith Coliseum (6,267); Oxford, MS
11/26/2013*; 3:00 pm		North Carolina A&T; Barclays Center Classic	W 84–50	4–0	Tad Smith Coliseum (6,511); Oxford, MS
11/29/2013*; 3:30 pm, NBCSN		vs. Georgia Tech; Barclays Center Classic	W 77–67	5–0	Barclays Center; Brooklyn, NY
11/30/2013*; 3:30 pm, NBCSN		vs. Penn State; Barclays Center Classic	W 79–76	6–0	Barclays Center (3,088); Brooklyn, NY
12/5/2013*; 8:00 pm, ESPN2		at Kansas State; Big 12/SEC Challenge	L 58–61	6–1	Bramlage Coliseum (11,990); Manhattan, KS
12/8/2013*; 4:00 pm, ESPNU		No. 13 Oregon	L 105–115 ^{OT}	6–2	Tad Smith Coliseum (8,212); Oxford, MS
12/14/2013*; 1:00 pm, CSS		Middle Tennessee	W 72–63	7–2	Tad Smith Coliseum (6,186); Oxford, MS
12/18/2013*; 6:00 pm, CSS		Louisiana–Monroe	W 75–62	8–2	Tad Smith Coliseum (5,754); Oxford, MS
12/22/2013*; 2:00 pm, CSS		Mercer	L 76–79	8–3	Tad Smith Coliseum (7,794); Oxford, MS
12/30/2013*; 7:00 pm		at Western Kentucky	W 79–74	9–3	E. A. Diddle Arena (7,523); Bowling Green, KY
1/4/2014*; 1:00 pm, CSS		Dayton	L 80–83 ^{OT}	9–4	Tad Smith Coliseum (7,035); Oxford, MS
Conference games
1/9/2014; 6:00 pm, ESPN/2		Auburn	W 65–62	10–4 (1–0)	Tad Smith Coliseum (6,355); Oxford, MS
1/11/2014; 3:00 pm, ESPNU		at Mississippi State	L 72–76	10–5 (1–1)	Humphrey Coliseum (8,841); Starkville, MS
1/15/2014; 8:00 pm, CSS		LSU	W 88–74 ^{OT}	11–5 (2–1)	Tad Smith Coliseum (7,884); Oxford, MS
1/18/2014; 3:30 pm, FSN		at South Carolina	W 75–74	12–5 (3–1)	Colonial Life Arena (14,302); Columbia, SC
1/22/2014; 8:00 pm, CSS		at Vanderbilt	W 63–52	13–5 (4–1)	Memorial Gymnasium (8,952); Nashville, TN
1/25/2014; 3:00 pm, SECN		Mississippi State	W 82–63	14–5 (5–1)	Tad Smith Coliseum (8,843); Oxford, MS
1/29/2014; 7:00 pm, SECN		at Tennessee	L 70–86	14–6 (5–2)	Thompson-Boling Arena (14,341); Knoxville, TN
2/1/2014; 12:30 pm, SECN		South Carolina	W 75–71	15–6 (6–2)	Tad Smith Coliseum (6,977); Oxford, MS
2/4/2014; 6:00 pm, ESPNU		at No. 18 Kentucky	L 60–84	15–7 (6–3)	Rupp Arena (22,168); Lexington, KY
2/8/2014; 4:00 pm, FSN		Missouri	W 91–88	16–7 (7–3)	Tad Smith Coliseum (8,696); Oxford, MS
2/11/2014; 8:00 pm, ESPNU		at Alabama	L 64–67	16–8 (7–4)	Coleman Coliseum (9,703); Tuscaloosa, AL
2/15/2014; 3:00 pm, FSN		at Georgia	L 60–61	16–9 (7–5)	Stegeman Coliseum (10,523); Athens, GA
2/18/2014; 6:00 pm, ESPN		No. 18 Kentucky	L 70–84	16–10 (7–6)	Tad Smith Coliseum (8,476); Oxford, MS
2/22/2014; 11:00 am, CBS		No. 2 Florida	L 71–75	16–11 (7–7)	Tad Smith Coliseum (8,140); Oxford, MS
2/26/2014; 6:00 pm, ESPN3		Alabama	W 79–67	17–11 (8–7)	Tad Smith Coliseum (7,165); Oxford, MS
3/1/2014; 6:00 pm, FSN		at Texas A&M	L 60–71	17–12 (8–8)	Reed Arena (6,811); College Station, TX
3/5/2014; 7:00 pm, ESPN3		at Arkansas	L 80–110	17–13 (8–9)	Bud Walton Arena (15,962); Fayetteville, AR
3/8/2014; 12:30 pm, SECN		Vanderbilt	W 65–62	18–13 (9–9)	Tad Smith Coliseum (7,479); Oxford, MS
SEC tournament
03/13/2014; 9:30 pm, SECN		vs. Mississippi State; Second round	W 78–66	19–13	Georgia Dome; Atlanta, GA
03/14/2014; 8:40 pm, SECN		vs. Georgia; Quarterfinals	L 73–75	19–14	Georgia Dome (19,056); Atlanta, GA
*Non-conference game. ^{#}Rankings from AP Poll. (#) Tournament seedings in parentheses. All times are in Central Time.

== See also ==
- 2013–14 Ole Miss Rebels women's basketball team
