= 2013–14 Alabama Crimson Tide men's basketball team =

American college basketball season

2013–14 Alabama Crimson Tide men's basketball
- Conference: Southeastern Conference
- Record: 13–19 (7–11 SEC)
- Head coach: Anthony Grant (5th season)
- Assistant coaches: John Brannen (5th season); Tony Pujol (4th season); Antoine Pettway (2nd season)
- Home arena: Coleman Coliseum (Capacity: 15,316)

2013–14 Southeastern Conference men's basketball standings
	Conf.				Overall
Team	W		L	PCT	W		L	PCT
No. 1 Florida †	18	–	0	1.000	36	–	3	.923
Kentucky	12	–	6	.667	29	–	11	.725
Georgia	12	–	6	.667	20	–	14	.588
Tennessee	11	–	7	.611	24	–	13	.649
Arkansas	10	–	8	.556	22	–	12	.647
Missouri	9	–	9	.500	23	–	12	.657
LSU	9	–	9	.500	20	–	14	.588
Ole Miss	9	–	9	.500	19	–	14	.576
Texas A&M	8	–	10	.444	18	–	16	.529
Vanderbilt	7	–	11	.389	15	–	16	.484
Alabama	7	–	11	.389	13	–	19	.406
Auburn	6	–	12	.333	14	–	16	.467
South Carolina	5	–	13	.278	14	–	20	.412
Mississippi State	3	–	15	.167	14	–	19	.424
† 2014 SEC tournament winner Rankings from AP poll

The 2013–14 Alabama Crimson Tide men's basketball team (variously "Alabama", "UA", "Bama" or "The Tide") represented the University of Alabama in the 2013–14 college basketball season. The team's head coach was Anthony Grant, in his fifth season at Alabama after posting a 23–13 record in the 2012–13 season, when the Crimson Tide finished tied for second in the SEC and received a bid to the 2013 National Invitation Tournament. The team played their home games at Coleman Coliseum in Tuscaloosa, Alabama, as a member of the Southeastern Conference. This was the 101st season of basketball in the school's history.

== Off-season ==
=== Departures ===
Just a week after completing the 2012–13 season, associate head coach Dan Hipsher was named head coach at the University of Texas-Pan American. Former Alabama player Antoine Pettway was promoted to assistant head coach, replacing Hipsher. Then, on April 9, starting center Moussa Gueye announced that he would be transferring from the program, ultimately landing at Valparaiso University. Two weeks later, former 5-star recruit Trevor Lacey announced he would also be transferring from Alabama. Lacey, the only player to start all 36 contests, later announced he would attend North Carolina State University, joining former Crimson Tide head coach Mark Gottfried. On June 4, freshman Devonta Pollard, also a former 5-star recruit, was charged as part of a kidnapping for which his mother was arrested the previous month. Pollard faces one count of conspiracy to commit kidnapping in the April 30 abduction of a child who was taken from her school in Scooba, Mississippi. It was later announced that Pollard was no longer a member of the Crimson Tide basketball team.

=== Arrivals ===
The Crimson Tide also added 2 transfers, 2 freshmen signees as well as a junior college transfer. Guard Ricky Tarrant, a two-time all-conference performer, transferred from Tulane University and will have to sit out the 2013-14 season per NCAA rules. The former Conference USA Freshman of the Year will have two years of eligibility remaining. Before transferring to Alabama, Michael Kessens, a 6-9, 215-pound power forward who played his freshman season at Longwood University. Kessens, a native of Nyon, Switzerland, will also have to sit out this year but will have three years of eligibility remaining.

=== Class of 2013 signees ===
College recruiting
Name	Hometown	School	Height	Weight	Commit date
Shannon Hale; PF	Arden, NC	Christ School	6 ft 8 in (2.03 m)	200 lb (91 kg)	Oct 21, 2010
Shannon Hale; PF	Recruit ratings: Scout: Rivals: (82)				
Algie Key; G	Decatur, GA	Barton Community College	6 ft 4 in (1.93 m)	175 lb (79 kg)	Apr 12, 2013
Algie Key; G	Recruit ratings: Scout: Rivals: (N/A)				
Jimmie Taylor; C	Greensboro, AL	Greensboro High School	6 ft 10 in (2.08 m)	210 lb (95 kg)	May 11, 2012
Jimmie Taylor; C	Recruit ratings: Scout: Rivals: (85)				
Overall recruit ranking:
Note: In many cases, Scout, Rivals, 247Sports, On3, and ESPN may conflict in their listings of height and weight.; In these cases, the average was taken. ESPN grades are on a 100-point scale.; Sources: "Alabama Basketball Commitments". Rivals.; "2013 Alabama Basketball Commits". Scout.; "ESPN". ESPN.; "Scout.com Team Recruiting Rankings". Scout.; "2013 Team Ranking". Rivals.

== Roster ==
2013–14 Alabama Crimson Tide men's basketball team
Players
Coaches

Pos.	#	Name	Height	Weight	Year	Hometown
G	0	Algie Key	6 ft 4 in (1.93 m)	175 lb (79 kg)	Jr	Decatur, Georgia
G	2	Ricky Tarrant (i)	6 ft 2 in (1.88 m)	190 lb (86 kg)	Jr	Pleasant Grove, Alabama
F	3	Michael Kessens (i)	6 ft 9 in (2.06 m)	215 lb (98 kg)	So	Nyon, Switzerland
C	4	Carl Engström	7 ft 1 in (2.16 m)	285 lb (129 kg)	RS Jr	Ystad, Sweden
F	10	Jimmie Taylor	6 ft 10 in (2.08 m)	235 lb (107 kg)	Fr	Greensboro, Alabama
F	11	Shannon Hale	6 ft 8 in (2.03 m)	200 lb (91 kg)	Fr	Johnson City, Tennessee
G	12	Trevor Releford	6 ft 0 in (1.83 m)	195 lb (88 kg)	Sr	Shawnee Mission, Kansas
F	13	Julian Goode (w)	6 ft 7 in (2.01 m)	225 lb (102 kg)	Sr	Atlanta, Georgia
F	15	Nick Jacobs	6 ft 8 in (2.03 m)	265 lb (120 kg)	Jr	Atlanta, Georgia
G	20	Levi Randolph	6 ft 5 in (1.96 m)	205 lb (93 kg)	Jr	Madison, Alabama
F	21	Rodney Cooper	6 ft 6 in (1.98 m)	215 lb (98 kg)	Jr	Hurtsboro, Alabama
G	32	Retin Obasohan	6 ft 1 in (1.85 m)	210 lb (95 kg)	RS So	Antwerp, Belgium
G	33	Isiah Wilson (w)	6 ft 3 in (1.91 m)	175 lb (79 kg)	Sr	Troy, Alabama
F	35	Dakota Slaughter	6 ft 6 in (1.98 m)	215 lb (98 kg)	Jr	Fishers, Indiana

Head coach

- Anthony Grant (Dayton)

Assistant coach(es)

- John Brannen (Marshall)
- Antoine Pettway (Alabama)
- Tony Pujol (Sterling College)

Legend

- (C) Team captain
- (S) Suspended
- (I) Ineligible
- (W) Walk-on
- Injured
- Current redshirt

Source: Rolltide.com 2013–14 Roster

=== Depth chart ===
Pos.	Starting 5	Bench 1	Bench 2
C	Jimmie Taylor	Nick Jacobs	Carl Engström
PF	Rodney Cooper	Shannon Hale
SF	Levi Randolph	Dakota Slaughter
SG	Retin Obasohan	Algie Key
PG	Trevor Releford

== Schedule and results ==
Date time, TV	Rank^{#}	Opponent^{#}	Result	Record	High points	High rebounds	High assists	Site (attendance) city, state
Exhibition
Nov 4*; 7:00 pm		West Georgia	W 65–64 ^{OT}	–	27 – Releford	9 – Jacobs	3 – Cooper	Coleman Coliseum (9, 542); Tuscaloosa, AL
Non-conference regular season
Nov 8*; 4:00 pm, FSN		vs. Oklahoma	L 73–82	0–1	20 – Key	10 – Jacobs	2 – Releford	American Airlines Center (5,207); Dallas, TX
Nov 14*; 8:00 pm, ESPN2		Texas Tech; Big 12/SEC Challenge	W 76–64	1–1	29 – Releford	7 – Cooper	4 – Obasohan	Coleman Coliseum (10,746); Tuscaloosa, AL
Nov 18*; 7:00 pm, ESPN3	No. (3)	Stillman College; NIT Season Tip-Off	W 102–65	2–1	17 – Randolph	8 – Engstrom	5 – Key	Coleman Coliseum (9,903); Tuscaloosa, AL
Nov 19*; 7:00 pm, ESPN3	No. (3)	Georgia State; NIT Season Tip-Off	W 75–58	3–1	19 – Releford	7 – Hale	2 – Cooper	Coleman Coliseum (9,527); Tuscaloosa, AL
Nov 27*; 8:30 pm, ESPN2	No. (3)	vs. No. 6 (2) Duke; NIT Season Tip-Off	L 64–74	3–2	18 – Jacobs	7 – Jacobs	3 – Cooper	Madison Square Garden (8,741); New York, NY
Nov 29*; 3:30 pm, ESPN3	No. (3)	vs. No. (8) Drexel; NIT Season Tip-Off	L 83–85 ^{3OT}	3–3	23 – Jacobs	10 – Randolph	5 – Obasohan	Madison Square Garden (13,266); New York, NY
Dec 4*; 7:00 pm, CSS		North Florida	W 76–48	4–3	20 – Randolph	9 – Taylor	5 – Releford	Coleman Coliseum (9,398); Tuscaloosa, AL
Dec 7*; 8:00 pm, ESPNU		at South Florida	L 64–66	4–4	20 – Obasohan	5 – Engstrom	3 – Releford	USF Sun Dome (4,255); Tampa, FL
Dec 14*; 7:00 pm		Charleston Southern	W 59–45	5–4	22 – Obasohan	9 – Obasohan	3 – Cooper	Coleman Coliseum (10,132); Tuscaloosa, AL
Dec 17*; 8:00 pm, ESPNU		#11 Wichita State	L 67–72	5–5	22 – Releford	5 – Taylor	6 – Releford	Coleman Coliseum (9,918); Tuscaloosa, AL
Dec 21*; 6:00 pm, CSS		Xavier	L 74–77	5–6	17 – Releford	8 – Cooper	3 – Releford	Coleman Coliseum (10,477); Tuscaloosa, AL
Dec 28*; 9:00 pm, ESPN2		at UCLA	L 67–75	5–7	34 – Releford	9 – Hale	3 – Randolph	Pauley Pavilion (9,061); Los Angeles, CA
Jan 4*; 4:30 pm, CSS		Robert Morris	W 64–56	6–7	18 – Releford	7 – Obasohan	4 – Cooper	Coleman Coliseum (10,125); Tuscaloosa, AL
SEC regular season
Jan 7; 8:00 pm, ESPNU		Vanderbilt	W 68–63	7–7 (1–0)	16 – Releford	4 – Tied	6 – Releford	Coleman Coliseum (10,304); Tuscaloosa, AL
Jan 11; 3:00 pm, SECN		at Georgia	L 58–66	7–8 (1–1)	17 – Releford	6 – Cooper	3 – Tied	Stegeman Coliseum (8,118); Athens, GA
Jan 15; 7:00 pm, SECN		Mississippi State	W 80–61	8–8 (2–1)	28 – Releford	5 – Tied	4 – Releford	Coleman Coliseum (10,112); Tuscaloosa, AL
Jan 18; 1:00 pm, ESPN		at Missouri	L 47–68	8–9 (2–2)	12 – Hale	8 – Taylor	3 – Cooper	Mizzou Arena (11,003); Columbia, MO
Jan 23; 6:00 pm, ESPN		#6 Florida	L 62–68	8–10 (2–3)	14 – Releford	7 – Key	7 – Releford	Coleman Coliseum (11,892); Tuscaloosa, AL
Jan 25; 7:00 pm, ESPN2		LSU	W 82–80	9–10 (3–3)	21 – Releford	6 – Cooper	6 – Hale	Coleman Coliseum (12,601); Tuscaloosa, AL
Jan 30^{[a]} 7:30 pm, SECN		at Auburn	L 55–74	9–11 (3–4)	15 – Releford	7 – Cooper	2 – Tied	Auburn Arena (9,102); Auburn, AL
Feb 1; 8:00 pm, ESPN2		Tennessee	L 59–76	9–12 (3–5)	23 – Releford	6 – Jacobs	6 – Releford	Coleman Coliseum (12,620); Tuscaloosa, AL
Feb 5; 7:00 pm, SECN		at Arkansas	L 58–65	9–13 (3–6)	22 – Cooper	10 – Cooper	3 – Key	Bud Walton Arena (14,869); Fayetteville, AR
Feb 8; 11:00 am, ESPN		at #3 Florida	L 69–78	9–14 (3–7)	25 – Releford	6 – Cooper	4 – Releford	O'Connell Center (12,520); Gainesville, FL
Feb 11; 8:00 pm, ESPNU		Ole Miss	W 67–64	10–14 (4–7)	26 – Releford	10 – Cooper	3 – Tied	Coleman Coliseum (9,703); Tuscaloosa, AL
Feb 15; 3:00 pm, SECN		at South Carolina	L 66–67	10–15 (4–8)	27 – Releford	5 – Cooper	5 – Cooper	Colonial Life Arena (8,186); Columbia, SC
Feb 20; 6:00 pm, ESPN		at Texas A&M	L 48–63	10–16 (4–9)	20 – Releford	9 – Hale	3 – Hale	Reed Arena (7,089); College Station, TX
Feb 22; 7:00 pm, ESPN2		Missouri	W 80–73	11–16 (5–9)	33 – Randolph	6 – Cooper	6 – Releford	Coleman Coliseum (10,907); Tuscaloosa, AL
Feb 26; 7:00 pm, ESPN3		at Ole Miss	L 67–79	11–17 (5–10)	27 – Hale	9 – Hale	3 – Tied	Tad Smith Coliseum (7,165); Oxford, MS
Mar 1; 2:00 pm, ESPNU		Auburn	W 73–57	12–17 (6–10)	24 – Randolph	9 – Tied	7 – Releford	Coleman Coliseum (13,499); Tuscaloosa, AL
Mar 4; 8:00 pm, ESPN		at Kentucky	L 48–55	12–18 (6–11)	13 – Releford	6 – Hale	3 – Releford	Rupp Arena (23,504); Lexington, KY
Mar 8; 3:00 pm, ESPN3		Arkansas	W 83–58	13–18 (7–11)	24 – Releford	7 – Tie	4 – Releford	Coleman Coliseum (10,961); Tuscaloosa, AL
2014 SEC tournament
Mar 13; 6:00 pm, SECN	(10)	vs. (7) LSU; Second round	L 56–68	13–19	11 – Releford, Hale	6 – Randolph	3 – Releford	Georgia Dome (–); Atlanta, GA
*Non-conference game. Rankings from AP poll. All times are in Central Time. (#) is seed within tournament.

Notes:

^{^[a]}Game was originally scheduled for January 29, 2014, but was moved to January 30 due to snowy conditions across Alabama.

Source: 2013–14 Schedule. Rolltide.com

== See also ==
- Iron Bowl of Basketball
- 2013–14 NCAA Division I men's basketball season
- 2013–14 NCAA Division I men's basketball rankings
- 2013–14 Alabama Crimson Tide women's basketball team
