= 2013–14 Georgia Bulldogs basketball team =

American college basketball season

2013–14 Georgia Bulldogs men's basketball

NIT Second round vs. Louisiana Tech, L 71–79
- Conference: Southeastern Conference
- Record: 20–14 (12–6 SEC)
- Head coach: Mark Fox (5th season)
- Assistant coaches: Jonas Hayes; Stacey Palmore; Philip Pearson
- Home arena: Stegeman Coliseum

2013–14 Southeastern Conference men's basketball standings
	Conf.				Overall
Team	W		L	PCT	W		L	PCT
No. 1 Florida †	18	–	0	1.000	36	–	3	.923
Kentucky	12	–	6	.667	29	–	11	.725
Georgia	12	–	6	.667	20	–	14	.588
Tennessee	11	–	7	.611	24	–	13	.649
Arkansas	10	–	8	.556	22	–	12	.647
Missouri	9	–	9	.500	23	–	12	.657
LSU	9	–	9	.500	20	–	14	.588
Ole Miss	9	–	9	.500	19	–	14	.576
Texas A&M	8	–	10	.444	18	–	16	.529
Vanderbilt	7	–	11	.389	15	–	16	.484
Alabama	7	–	11	.389	13	–	19	.406
Auburn	6	–	12	.333	14	–	16	.467
South Carolina	5	–	13	.278	14	–	20	.412
Mississippi State	3	–	15	.167	14	–	19	.424
† 2014 SEC tournament winner Rankings from AP poll

The 2013–14 Georgia Bulldogs basketball team represented the University of Georgia during the 2013–14 NCAA Division I men's basketball season. The team's head coach was Mark Fox, who was in his fifth season at UGA. They played their home games at Stegeman Coliseum and were members of the Southeastern Conference.

== Before the season ==
=== Departures ===
Name	Number	Pos.	Height	Weight	Year	Hometown	Notes
Vincent Williams	11	G	6'1"	160	Senior	Homestead, Florida	Graduated
Sherrad Brantley	23	G	6'2"	180	Senior	Dublin, Georgia	Graduated
John Florveus	32	F	6'11"	230	Senior	Miami, Florida	Graduated
Kentavious Caldwell-Pope	1	G	6'5"	200	Sophomore	Greenville, Georgia	Entered 2013 NBA draft

=== Recruits ===
College recruiting information
Name	Hometown	School	Height	Weight	Commit date
J. J. Frazier; PG	Ludowici, GA	Faith Baptist Christian	5 ft 9 in (1.75 m)	160 lb (73 kg)	Feb 10, 2012
J. J. Frazier; PG	Recruit ratings: Scout: Rivals: (69)				
Juwan Parker; SG	Tulsa, OK	Washington	6 ft 4 in (1.93 m)	180 lb (82 kg)	Aug 19, 2012
Juwan Parker; SG	Recruit ratings: Scout: Rivals: (68)				
Kenny Paul Geno; SF	Booneville, MS	Booneville	6 ft 6 in (1.98 m)	200 lb (91 kg)	Apr 17, 2013
Kenny Paul Geno; SF	Recruit ratings: (67)				
Overall recruit ranking: Scout: Not Ranked Rivals: Not Ranked ESPN: Not Ranked
Note: In many cases, Scout, Rivals, 247Sports, On3, and ESPN may conflict in their listings of height and weight.; In these cases, the average was taken. ESPN grades are on a 100-point scale.; Sources: "Georgia 2013 Basketball Commitments". Rivals.; "2013 Georgia Basketball Commits". Scout.; "ESPN". ESPN.; "Scout.com Team Recruiting Rankings". Scout.; "2013 Team Ranking". Rivals.

== Season ==
=== Preseason ===
Georgia's schedule was released in August 2013. Key non-conference games included a trip to the Charleston Classic as well as a road date against Colorado. In SEC play, the Bulldogs' schedule was highlighted by visits from LSU and Alabama to Athens, as well as travelling to Rupp Arena to play Kentucky.

== Roster ==
2013–14 Georgia Bulldogs men's basketball team
Players
Coaches

Pos.	#	Name	Height	Weight	Year	Previous school	Hometown
F	2	Marcus Thornton	6 ft 8 in (2.03 m)	235 lb (107 kg)	RS Jr	Westlake HS	Atlanta, GA
G	3	Juwan Parker	6 ft 4 in (1.93 m)	200 lb (91 kg)	Fr	Washington HS	Tulsa, OK
G	4	Charles Mann	6 ft 5 in (1.96 m)	210 lb (95 kg)	So	Milton HS	Alpharetta, GA
F/C	5	Tim Dixon	6 ft 10 in (2.08 m)	230 lb (104 kg)	Jr	Oldsmar Christian	Columbus, GA
G	10	Taylor Echols (W)	6 ft 1 in (1.85 m)	160 lb (73 kg)	Jr	Eagle's Landing Christian	McDonough, GA
F	11	Cameron Forte	6 ft 7 in (2.01 m)	220 lb (100 kg)	So	McClintock HS; Howard College	Tempe, AZ
G	12	Kenny Gaines	6 ft 3 in (1.91 m)	195 lb (88 kg)	So	Whitefield Academy	Atlanta, GA
G	14	Brandon Young (W)	5 ft 10 in (1.78 m)	160 lb (73 kg)	Fr	Marist HS	Atlanta, GA
F	15	Donte' Williams	6 ft 9 in (2.06 m)	225 lb (102 kg)	Sr	Miller Grove HS	Ellenwood, GA
G	20	Dusan Langura	6 ft 4 in (1.93 m)	210 lb (95 kg)	Fr	Furtah Preparatory School	Romont, Switzerland
F	24	Houston Kessler	6 ft 8 in (2.03 m)	225 lb (102 kg)	RS Fr	Landmark Christian	Newnan, GA
F	25	Kenny Paul Geno	6 ft 6 in (1.98 m)	200 lb (91 kg)	Fr	Booneville HS	Booneville, MS
G	30	J. J. Frazier	5 ft 10 in (1.78 m)	150 lb (68 kg)	Fr	Faith Baptist Christian	Glennville, GA
F	31	Brandon Morris	6 ft 7 in (2.01 m)	215 lb (98 kg)	So	Miller Grove HS	Lithonia, GA
C	41	John Cannon	6 ft 10 in (2.08 m)	240 lb (109 kg)	Jr	Mountain Heritage	Burnsville, NC
F	42	Nemanja Djurisic	6 ft 8 in (2.03 m)	230 lb (104 kg)	Jr	South Kent School	Podgorica, Montenegro

Head coach

- Mark Fox (Eastern New Mexico)

Assistant coach(es)

- Jonas Hayes (Georgia)
- Stacey Palmore (Livingstone)
- Philip Pearson (Alabama)

Legend

- (C) Team captain
- (S) Suspended
- (I) Ineligible
- (W) Walk-on
- Injured
- Current redshirt

== Schedule and results ==
Date time, TV	Rank^{#}	Opponent^{#}	Result	Record	Site (attendance) city, state
Exhibition
11/04/2013*; 7:00 pm		UNC Pembroke	W 81–69	–	Stegeman Coliseum (–); Athens, GA
Non-conference games
11/8/2013*; 7:30 pm		Wofford	W 72–52	1–0	Stegeman Coliseum (5,592); Athens, GA
11/15/2013*; 7:00 pm, FSN		Georgia Tech	L 71–80	1–1	Stegeman Coliseum (10,523); Athens, GA
11/21/2013*; 5:00 pm, ESPNU		vs. Davidson; Charleston Classic Quarterfinals	L 82–94	1–2	TD Arena (N/A); Charleston, SC
11/22/2013*; 7:00 pm, ESPN3		Temple; Charleston Classic Consolation 2nd round	L 81–83	1–3	TD Arena (N/A); Charleston, SC
11/24/2013*; 2:30 pm, ESPN3		Nebraska; Charleston Classic 7th place game	L 65–73	1–4	TD Arena (1,137); Charleston, SC
11/29/2013*; 5:00 pm, ESPN3/CSS		Appalachian State	W 71–53	2–4	Stegeman Coliseum (4,857); Athens, GA
12/2/2013*; 7:30 pm, ESPN3/CSS		Chattanooga	W 87–56	3–4	Stegeman Coliseum (4,226); Athens, GA
12/14/2013*; 4:00 pm		Lipscomb	W 84–75	4–4	Stegeman Coliseum (4,611); Athens, GA
12/19/2013*; 11:30 am		Gardner–Webb	W 58–49	5–4	Stegeman Coliseum (8,719); Athens, GA
12/21/2013*; 2:00 pm, CSS		Western Carolina	W 65–63	6–4	Stegeman Coliseum (6,069); Athens, GA
12/28/2013*; 10:00 pm, PACN		at Colorado	L 70–84	6–5	Coors Events Center (10,848); Boulder, CO
1/3/2014*; 7:00 pm		at George Washington	L 55–73	6–6	Charles E. Smith Athletic Center (3,063); Washington, DC
Conference games
1/8/2014; 8:00 pm, SECN		at Missouri	W 70–64 ^{OT}	7–6 (1–0)	Mizzou Arena (9,298); Columbia, MO
1/11/2014; 4:00 pm, SECN		Alabama	W 66–58	8–6 (2–0)	Stegeman Coliseum (8,118); Athens, GA
1/14/2014; 7:00 pm, ESPNU		at No. 7 Florida	L 50–72	8–7 (2–1)	O'Connell Center (12,051); Gainesville, FL
1/18/2014; 1:30 pm, SECN		Arkansas	W 66–61 ^{OT}	9–7 (3–1)	Stegeman Coliseum (6,662); Athens, GA
1/22/2014; 8:00 pm, SECN		South Carolina	W 97–76	10–7 (4–1)	Stegeman Coliseum (5,366); Athens, GA
1/25/2014; 1:30 pm, SECN		at No. 14 Kentucky	L 54–79	10–8 (4–2)	Rupp Arena (23,376); Lexington, KY
1/29/2014; 7:00 pm, CSS		Vanderbilt	L 54–59	10–9 (4–3)	Stegeman Coliseum (6,234); Athens, GA
2/1/2014; 1:30 pm, SECN		at Auburn	L 67–74	10–10 (4–4)	Auburn Arena (7,168); Auburn, AL
2/6/2014; 7:00 pm, ESPN2		LSU	W 91–78	11–10 (5–4)	Stegeman Coliseum (4,902); Athens, GA
2/8/2014; 8:00 pm, CSS		Texas A&M	W 62–50	12–10 (6–4)	Stegeman Coliseum (5,831); Athens, GA
2/12/2014; 9:00 pm, FSN		at Mississippi State	W 75–55	13–10 (7–4)	Humphrey Coliseum (7,010); Starkville, MS
2/15/2014; 4:00 pm, FSN		Ole Miss	W 61–60	14–10 (8–4)	Stegeman Coliseum (10,523); Athens, GA
2/18/2014; 9:00 pm, ESPNU		at Tennessee	L 48–67	14–11 (8–5)	Thompson-Boling Arena (13,852); Knoxville, TN
2/22/2014; 1:30 pm, SECN		at South Carolina	W 73–56	15–11 (9–5)	Colonial Life Arena (13,571); Columbia, SC
2/25/2014; 9:00 pm, ESPNU		Missouri	W 71–56	16–11 (10–5)	Stegeman Coliseum (5,229); Athens, GA
3/1/2014; 4:00 pm, SECN		at Arkansas	L 75–87	16–12 (10–6)	Bud Walton Arena (18,227); Fayetteville, AR
3/5/2014; 7:00 pm, CSS		Mississippi State	W 66–45	17–12 (11–6)	Stegeman Coliseum (5,165); Athens, GA
3/8/2014; 5:00 pm, FSN		at LSU	W 69–61	18–12 (12–6)	Pete Maravich Assembly Center (9,208); Baton Rouge, LA
SEC tournament
3/14/2014; 9:40 pm, SEC TV		vs. Ole Miss; Quarterfinals	W 75–73	19–12	Georgia Dome (N/A); Atlanta, GA
3/15/2014; 3:30 pm, ABC		vs. Kentucky; Semifinals	L 58–70	19–13	Georgia Dome (N/A); Atlanta, GA
NIT
3/19/2014*; 8:00 pm, ESPNU	No. (2)	(7) Vermont; First round	W 63–56	20–13	Stegeman Coliseum (3,951); Athens, GA
3/22/2014*; 11:00 am, ESPN	No. (2)	(3) Louisiana Tech; Second round	L 71–79	20–14	Stegeman Coliseum (3,692); Athens, GA
*Non-conference game. ^{#}Rankings from AP Poll, (#) during NIT is seed within region. (#) Tournament seedings in parentheses. All times are in Eastern Time.

== See also ==
- 2013–14 Georgia Lady Bulldogs basketball team
