= 2013–14 Vanderbilt Commodores men's basketball team =

American college basketball season

2013–14 Vanderbilt Commodores men's basketball
- Conference: Southeastern Conference
- Record: 15–16 (7–11 SEC)
- Head coach: Kevin Stallings (15th season)
- Assistant coaches: Yanni Hufnagel; Tom Richardson; David Cason
- Home arena: Memorial Gymnasium

2013–14 Southeastern Conference men's basketball standings
	Conf.				Overall
Team	W		L	PCT	W		L	PCT
No. 1 Florida †	18	–	0	1.000	36	–	3	.923
Kentucky	12	–	6	.667	29	–	11	.725
Georgia	12	–	6	.667	20	–	14	.588
Tennessee	11	–	7	.611	24	–	13	.649
Arkansas	10	–	8	.556	22	–	12	.647
Missouri	9	–	9	.500	23	–	12	.657
LSU	9	–	9	.500	20	–	14	.588
Ole Miss	9	–	9	.500	19	–	14	.576
Texas A&M	8	–	10	.444	18	–	16	.529
Vanderbilt	7	–	11	.389	15	–	16	.484
Alabama	7	–	11	.389	13	–	19	.406
Auburn	6	–	12	.333	14	–	16	.467
South Carolina	5	–	13	.278	14	–	20	.412
Mississippi State	3	–	15	.167	14	–	19	.424
† 2014 SEC tournament winner Rankings from AP poll

The 2013–14 Vanderbilt Commodores men's basketball team represented Vanderbilt University in the 2013–14 college basketball season. The team's head coach is Kevin Stallings, in his fifteenth season at Vanderbilt. The team played their home games at Memorial Gymnasium in Nashville, Tennessee, were member of the Southeastern Conference.

== Previous season ==
After a 21–10 record and an SEC tournament championship in 2012, the Commodores were in rebuild mode with 88.1% scoring lost heading into 2013. The Commodores finished 16–17, which was their first losing record since 2002-03 and second under Head Coach Kevin Stallings. The Commodores, however, did advance to the SEC Tournament semifinals for the fourth consecutive year.

=== Departures ===
Name	Number	Pos.	Height	Weight	Year	Hometown	Notes
Kevin Bright	15	G	6'5"	210	Freshman	Mannheim, Germany	Turned Pro (Germany)
A.J. Astroth	20	G/F	6'6"	200	Freshman	Tampa, Florida	Transferred
Sheldon Jeter	21	SF	6'7"	215	Freshman	Beaver Falls, Pennsylvania	Transferred

== Roster ==
2013–14 Vanderbilt Commodores men's basketball team
Players
Coaches

Pos.	#	Name	Height	Weight	Year	Hometown
F	0	Rod Odom	6 ft 9 in (2.06 m)	215 lb (98 kg)	Sr	Central Islip, New York
G	1	Eric McClellan (S)	6 ft 4 in (1.93 m)	180 lb (82 kg)	RS So	Austin, Texas
G	2	Kedren Johnson (I)	6 ft 4 in (1.93 m)	215 lb (98 kg)	Jr	Lewisburg, Tennessee
F	3	Luke Kornet	6 ft 10 in (2.08 m)	190 lb (86 kg)	Fr	Lantana, Texas
G	10	Nathan Watkins (W)	6 ft 5 in (1.96 m)	190 lb (86 kg)	So	Brentwood, Tennessee
G	11	Kyle Fuller	6 ft 1 in (1.85 m)	200 lb (91 kg)	Sr	Moreno Valley, California
G	12	Rob Cross (W)	6 ft 0 in (1.83 m)	195 lb (88 kg)	Sr	Chappaqua, New York
G	14	Carter Josephs (W)	5 ft 10 in (1.78 m)	165 lb (75 kg)	So	San Antonio, Texas
G	24	Dai-Jon Parker	6 ft 3 in (1.91 m)	190 lb (86 kg)	Jr	Baton Rouge, Louisiana
C	30	Damian Jones	6 ft 10 in (2.08 m)	230 lb (104 kg)	Fr	Baton Rouge, Louisiana
F	34	Shelby Moats	6 ft 8 in (2.03 m)	225 lb (102 kg)	Jr	Waconia, Minnesota
F	35	James Siakam	6 ft 6 in (1.98 m)	210 lb (95 kg)	RS Jr	Douala, Cameroon
C	40	Josh Henderson	6 ft 11 in (2.11 m)	230 lb (104 kg)	RS Jr	Roanoke, Virginia

Head coach

- Kevin Stallings (Purdue)

Assistant coach(es)

- David Cason (Illinois State)
- Yanni Hufnagel (Cornell)
- Tom Richardson (St. Xavier (IL))

Legend

- (C) Team captain
- (S) Suspended
- (I) Ineligible
- (W) Walk-on
- Injured
- Current redshirt

Roster
Last update: 2014-03-09

== Schedule and results ==
Date time, TV	Rank^{#}	Opponent^{#}	Result	Record	High points	High rebounds	High assists	Site (attendance) city, state
Non-conference regular season
Nov 12*; 7:00 pm		Georgia State	W 86–80	1–0	19 – Tied	7 – Jones	7 – Fuller	Memorial Gymnasium (8,241); Nashville, Tennessee
Nov 15*; 7:00 pm		Lipscomb	W 80–69	2–0	20 – Odom	13 – Siakam	6 – Fuller	Memorial Gymnasium (8,416); Nashville, Tennessee
Nov 19*; 5:00 pm, FS1		at Butler	L 77–85 ^{OT}	2–1	29 – McClellan	6 – Tied	3 – Tied	Hinkle Fieldhouse (6,617); Indianapolis, Indiana
Nov 22*; 5:30 pm, CBSSN		vs. Providence; Paradise Jam tournament	L 60–67	2–2	17 – Odom	7 – Henderson	6 – McClellan	Sports and Fitness Center (–); Saint Thomas, VI
Nov 23*; 4:00 pm, CBSSN		vs. Morgan State; Paradise Jam Tournament	W 75–66	3–2	16 – Fuller	6 – Tied	5 – Tied	Sports and Fitness Center (N/A); Saint Thomas, VI
Nov 25*; 4:00 pm, CBSSN		vs. Loyola Marymount; Paradise Jam Tournament	W 77–68	4–2	20 – Fuller	8 – Odom	4 – Tied	Sports and Fitness Center (1,222); Saint Thomas, VI
Dec 2*; 8:00 pm, ESPN2		at Texas; Big 12/SEC Challenge	L 64–70	4–3	22 – McClellan	6 – Tied	5 – Parker	Frank Erwin Center (7,431); Austin, Texas
Dec 5*; 7:00 pm		Marshall	W 69–67	5–3	15 – Tied	7 – McClellan	5 – Parker	Memorial Gymnasium (8,240); Nashville, Tennessee
Dec 17*; 8:00 pm, CSS		Austin Peay	W 58–56	6–3	12 – Jones	9 – Odom	3 – Parker	Memorial Gymnasium (8,422); Nashville, Tennessee
Dec 21*; 3:00 pm, FSN		Georgia Tech	W 76–63	7–3	18 – Odom	5 – Tied	4 – Parker	Memorial Gymnasium (9,022); Nashville, Tennessee
Dec 30*; 8:00 pm, ESPNU		Saint Louis	L 49–57	7–4	12 – Jones	8 – Siakam	8 – Fuller	Memorial Gymnasium (9,305); Nashville, Tennessee
Jan 4*; 8:00 pm		Northeastern	W 79–49	8–4	21 – Odom	7 – Tied	7 – Parker	Memorial Gymnasium (8,438); Nashville, Tennessee
SEC regular season
Jan 7; 8:00 pm, ESPNU		at Alabama	L 63–68	8–5 (0–1)	20 – Odom	10 – Odom	4 – Parker	Coleman Coliseum (10,304); Tuscaloosa, Alabama
Jan 11; 12:00 pm, CBS		No. 14 Kentucky	L 62–71	8–6 (0–2)	18 – Jones	11 – Jones	10 – Fuller	Memorial Gymnasium (14,316); Nashville, Tennessee
Jan 16; 6:00 pm, ESPN/ESPN2		Missouri	W 78–75	9–6 (1–2)	24 – Odom	8 – Odom	6 – Parker	Memorial Gymnasium (8,478); Nashville, Tennessee
Jan 18; 8:00 pm, ESPNU		at LSU	L 58–81	9–7 (1–3)	20 – Odom	6 – Odom	4 – Slakam	Maravich Center (9,716); Baton Rouge, Louisiana
Jan 22; 8:00 pm, CSS		Ole Miss	L 52–63	9–8 (1–4)	18 – Odom	10 – Jones	5 – Fuller	Memorial Gymnasium (8,952); Nashville, Tennessee
Jan 25; 12:00 pm, ESPNU		at Texas A&M	W 66–55	10–8 (2–4)	22 – Slakam	10 – Slakam	5 – Parker	Reed Arena (6,520); College Station, Texas
Jan 29; 6:00 pm, CSS		at Georgia	W 59–54	11–8 (3–4)	16 – Odom	12 – Odom	4 – Fuller, Parker	Stegeman Coliseum (6,234); Athens, Georgia
Feb 1; 4:00 pm, FSN		Mississippi State	W 55–49	12–8 (4–4)	18 – Odom	7 – Siakam	5 – Fuller	Memorial Gymnasium (9,170); Nashville, Tennessee
Feb 5; 7:00 pm, SECN		Tennessee	W 64–60	13–8 (5–4)	26 – Odom	7 – Parker	10 – Fuller	Memorial Gymnasium (10,733); Nashville, Tennessee
Feb 8; 3:00 pm, SECN		Arkansas	L 75–77	13–9 (5–5)	22 – Odom	7 – Jones	5 – Fuller	Memorial Gymnasium (10,647); Nashville, Tennessee
Feb 13; 7:00 pm, SECN		at South Carolina	L 59–65	13–10 (5–6)	20 – Fuller	10 – Jones	3 – Tied	Colonial Life Arena (9,829); Columbia, South Carolina
Feb 15; 12:30 pm, SECN		Texas A&M	W 57–54 ^{yes}	14–10 (6–6)	16 – Siakam	13 – Jones	4 – Fuller	Memorial Gymnasium (9,059); Nashville, Tennessee
Feb 19; 7:00 pm, SECN		at Missouri	L 64–67	14–11 (6–7)	19 – Jones	7 – Jones	9 – Fuller	Mizzou Arena (9,635); Columbia, Missouri
Feb 22; 7:00 pm, SECN		at Auburn	W 67–59	15–11 (7–7)	21 – Parker	9 – Siakam	9 – Josephs	Auburn Arena (6,814); Auburn, Alabama
Feb 25; 6:00 pm, ESPN		#1 Florida	L 54–57	15–12 (7–8)	12 – Odom	6 – Parker	3 – Parker	Memorial Gymnasium (11,132); Nashville, Tennessee
Mar 1; 11:00 am, ESPN/ESPN2		at Tennessee	L 38–76	15–13 (7–9)	9 – Fuller	7 – Parker	2 – Fuller	Thompson–Boling Arena (17,208); Knoxville, Tennessee
Mar 6; 6:00 pm, ESPN		LSU	L 51–57	15–14 (7–10)	15 – Odom	6 – Tied	4 – Parker	Memorial Gymnasium (9,968); Nashville, Tennessee
Mar 8; 12:30 pm, SECN		at Ole Miss	L 62–65	15–15 (7–11)	25 – Parker	11 – Jones	5 – Josephs	Tad Smith Coliseum (7,479); Oxford, Mississippi
2014 SEC tournament
Mar 12; 8:30 pm, ABC/SECN		vs. Mississippi State; First round	L 68–82	15–16	16 – Jones	5 – Siakam	3 – Tied	Georgia Dome (7,132); Atlanta
*Non-conference game. Rankings from AP poll. All times are in Central Time.

== See also ==
2013–14 Vanderbilt Commodores women's basketball team
