= 2013–14 Kentucky Wildcats men's basketball team =

2013–14 season of University of Kentucky men's basketball team

2013–14 Kentucky Wildcats men's basketball

NCAA tournament, Runner-up

National Championship Game, L 54–60 vs. Connecticut
- Conference: Southeastern Conference

Ranking
- Coaches: No. 2
- Record: 29–11 (12–6 SEC)
- Head coach: John Calipari (5th season)
- Assistant coaches: John Robic (5th season); Orlando Antigua (5th season); Kenny Payne (4th season)
- Home arena: Rupp Arena

2013–14 Southeastern Conference men's basketball standings
	Conf.				Overall
Team	W		L	PCT	W		L	PCT
No. 1 Florida †	18	–	0	1.000	36	–	3	.923
Kentucky	12	–	6	.667	29	–	11	.725
Georgia	12	–	6	.667	20	–	14	.588
Tennessee	11	–	7	.611	24	–	13	.649
Arkansas	10	–	8	.556	22	–	12	.647
Missouri	9	–	9	.500	23	–	12	.657
LSU	9	–	9	.500	20	–	14	.588
Ole Miss	9	–	9	.500	19	–	14	.576
Texas A&M	8	–	10	.444	18	–	16	.529
Vanderbilt	7	–	11	.389	15	–	16	.484
Alabama	7	–	11	.389	13	–	19	.406
Auburn	6	–	12	.333	14	–	16	.467
South Carolina	5	–	13	.278	14	–	20	.412
Mississippi State	3	–	15	.167	14	–	19	.424
† 2014 SEC tournament winner Rankings from AP poll

The 2013–14 Kentucky Wildcats men's basketball team represented the University of Kentucky in the 2013–14 college basketball season. The team played its home games in Lexington, Kentucky for the 39th consecutive season at Rupp Arena, with a capacity of 23,500. The team was led by fifth-year head coach John Calipari. This team was nicknamed the "Tweakables" in reference to Calipari's comment prior to the 2014 SEC tournament. The team was the National Runner-up in the NCAA tournament, and also marked Kentucky's 16th Final Four appearance. It was Calipari's third Final Four appearance at Kentucky.

Despite the 2012–13 team making the NIT, there were high expectations for this team. The team, however, would be without some of its top players from the 2012–13 team including Nerlens Noel and starting shooting guard Archie Goodwin, who were first-round draft choices in the 2013 NBA draft. Starting power forward Kyle Wiltjer transferred to Gonzaga and starting point guard Ryan Harrow transferred to Georgia State. Returning was former McDonald's All-American Alex Poythress and starting center Willie Cauley-Stein. The poor success of the 2012–13 team did not stop John Calipari from again producing another number one recruiting class. The entering class included a record six McDonald's All-Americans highlighted by Julius Randle and the Harrison Twins, Aaron and Andrew.

The Wildcats were led by 2014 Consensus All-American and Southeastern Conference Men's Basketball Rookie of the Year Randle, a unanimous first-team All-SEC selection. James Young (SEC 2nd team) also earned conference honors.

== Departures ==
2013–14 Kentucky departures

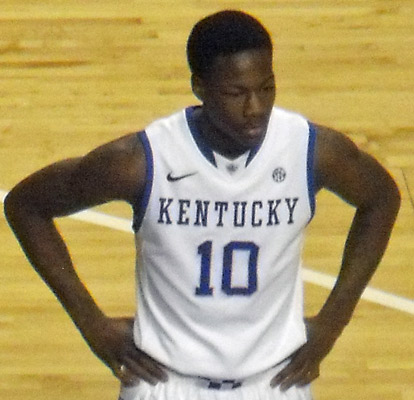
Archie Goodwin entered the NBA draft

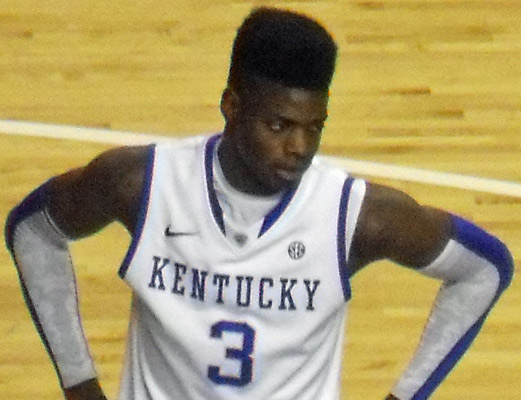
Nerlens Noel entered the NBA draft

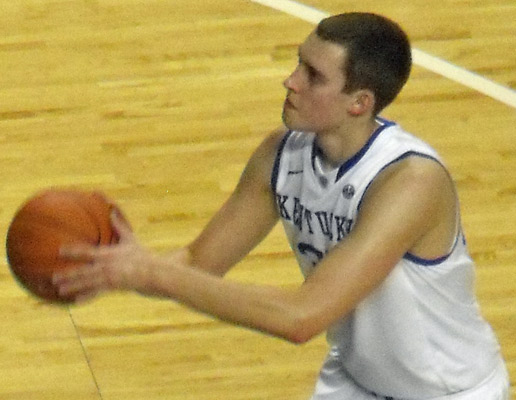
Kyle Wiltjer transferred to Gonzaga

Name	Number	Pos.	Height	Weight	Year	Hometown	Notes
Nerlens Noel	3	F	6'10"	228	Freshman	Everett, Massachusetts	Entered 2013 NBA draft
Archie Goodwin	10	G	6'4"	198	Freshman	Sherwood, Arkansas	Entered 2013 NBA draft
Twany Beckham	11	G	6'4"	202	Senior	Louisville, Kentucky	Graduated
Ryan Harrow	12	G	6'2"	170	Sophomore	Marietta, Georgia	Transferred to Georgia State
Kyle Wiltjer	33	F	6'10"	239	Sophomore	Portland, Oregon	Transferred to Gonzaga
Julius Mays	34	G	6'2"	192	Senior	Marion, Indiana	Graduated

== 2013–14 newcomers ==
Kentucky recruits at the 2013 McDonald's All-American Boys Game

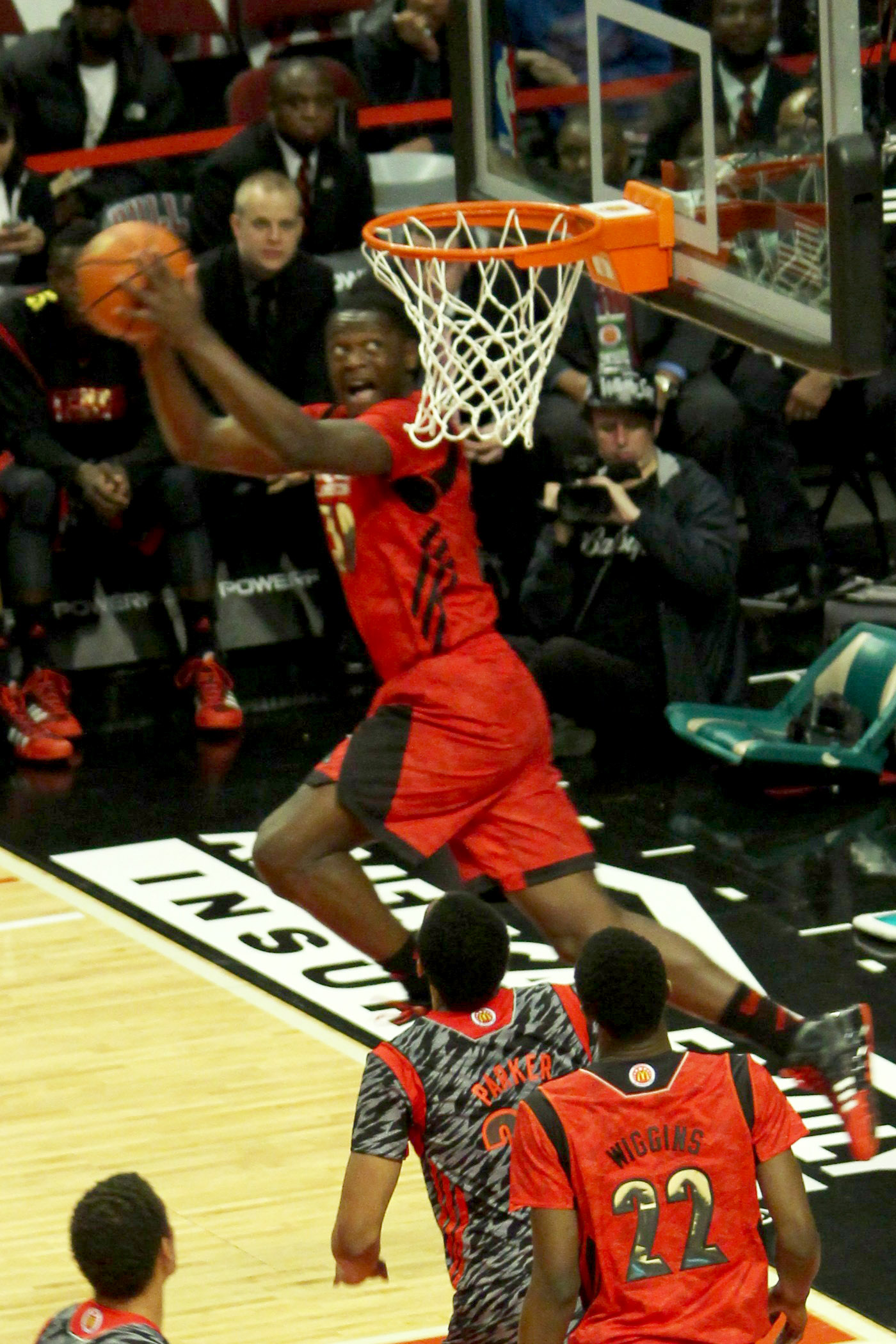
Julius Randle

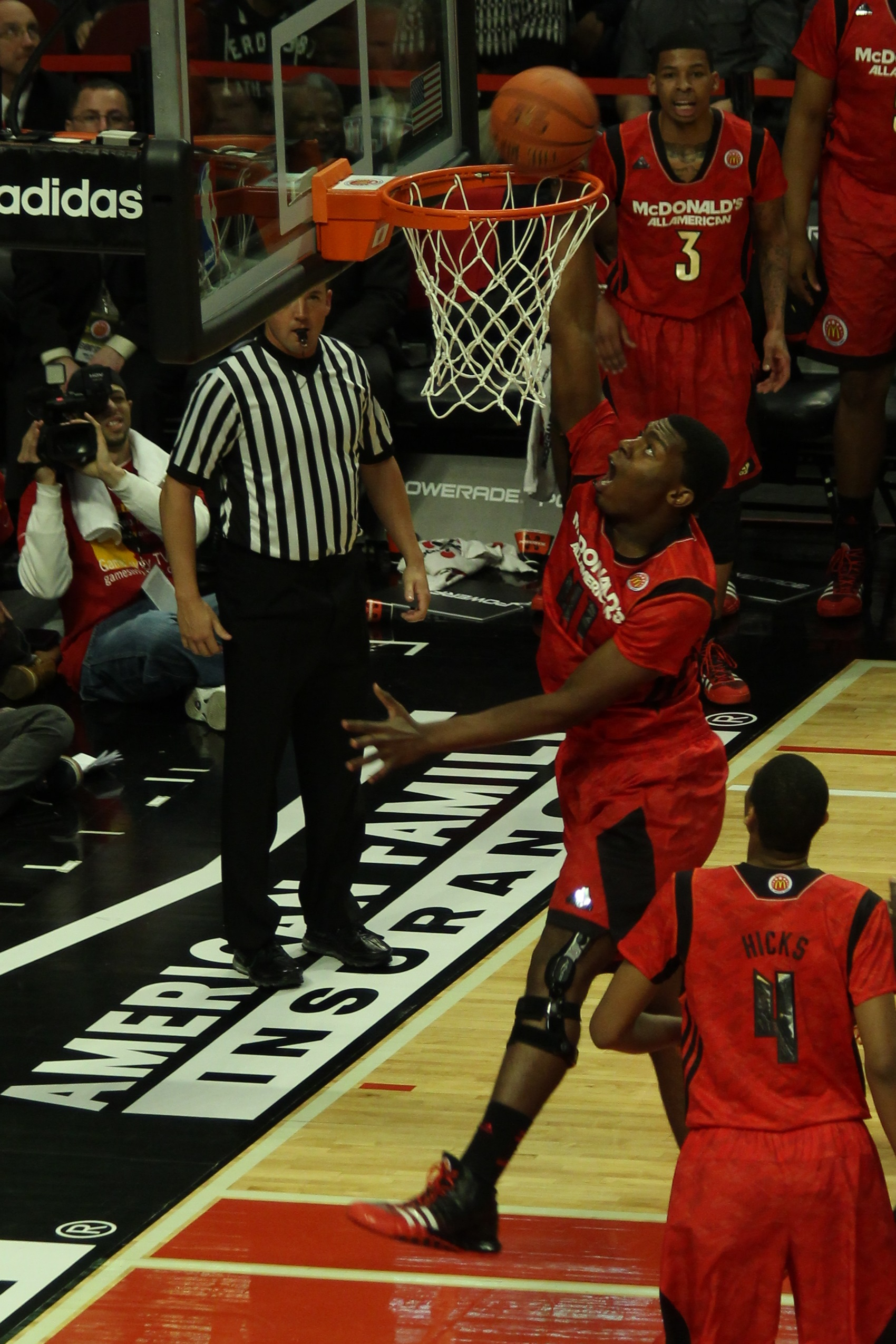
Dakari Johnson

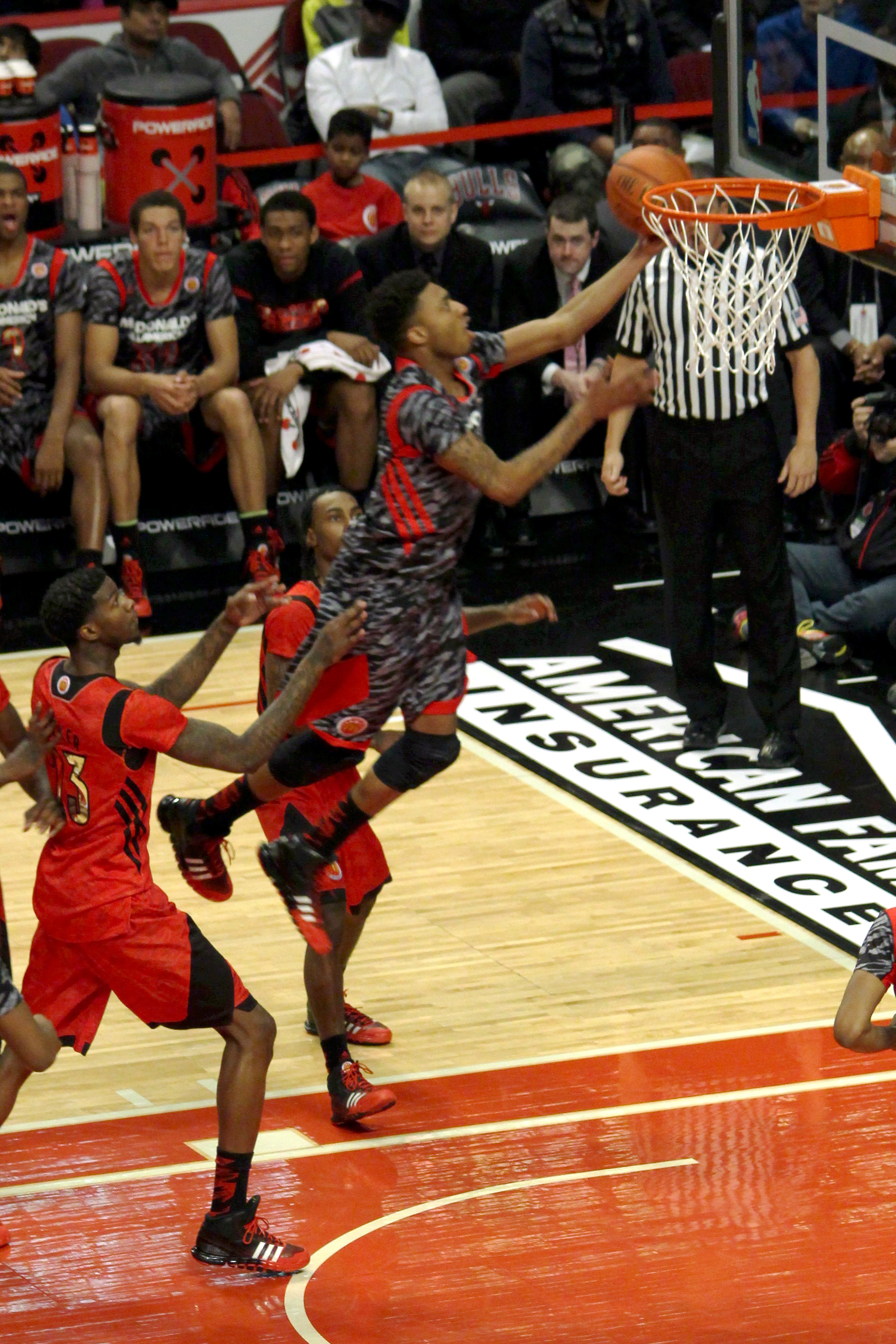
James Young

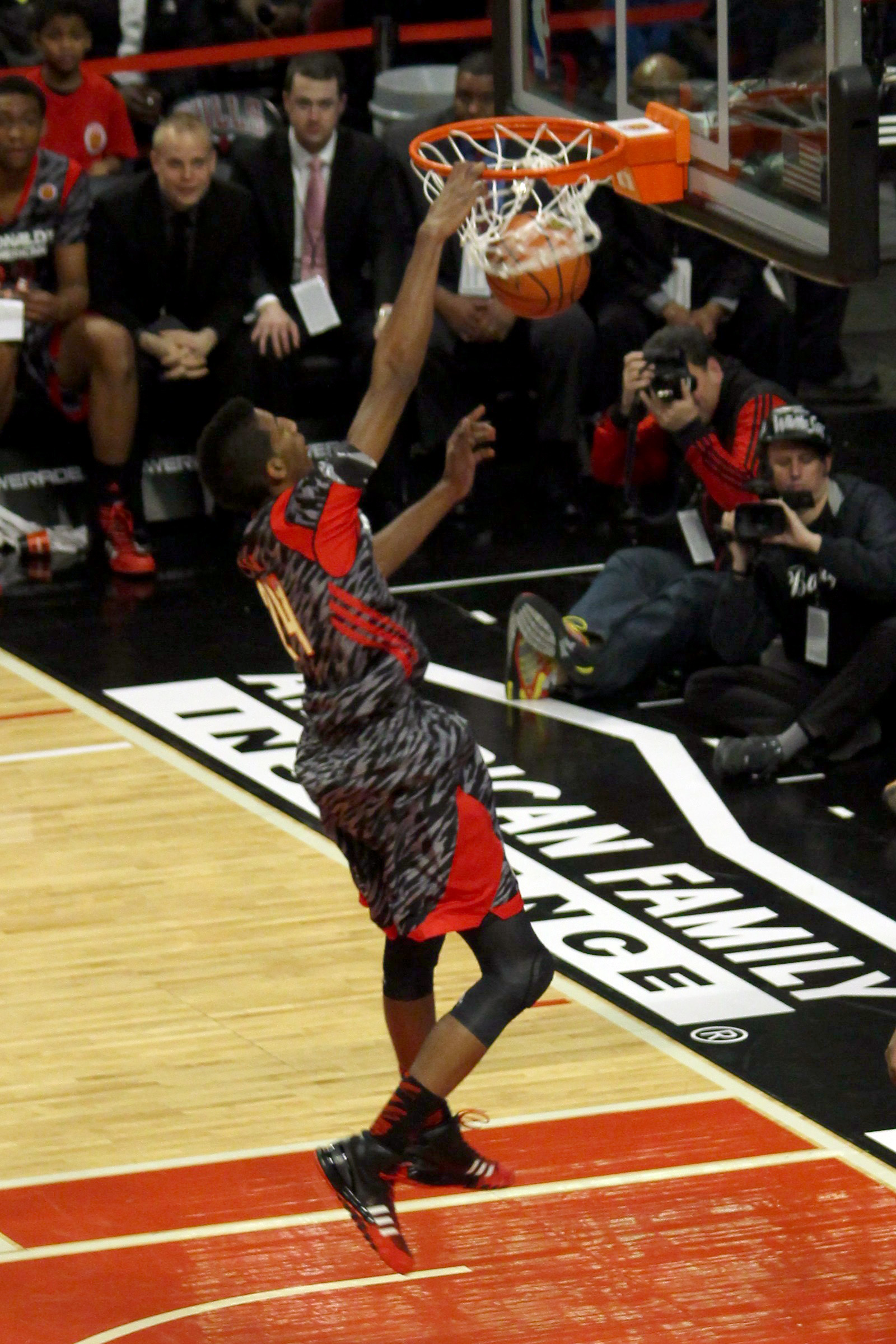
Marcus Lee

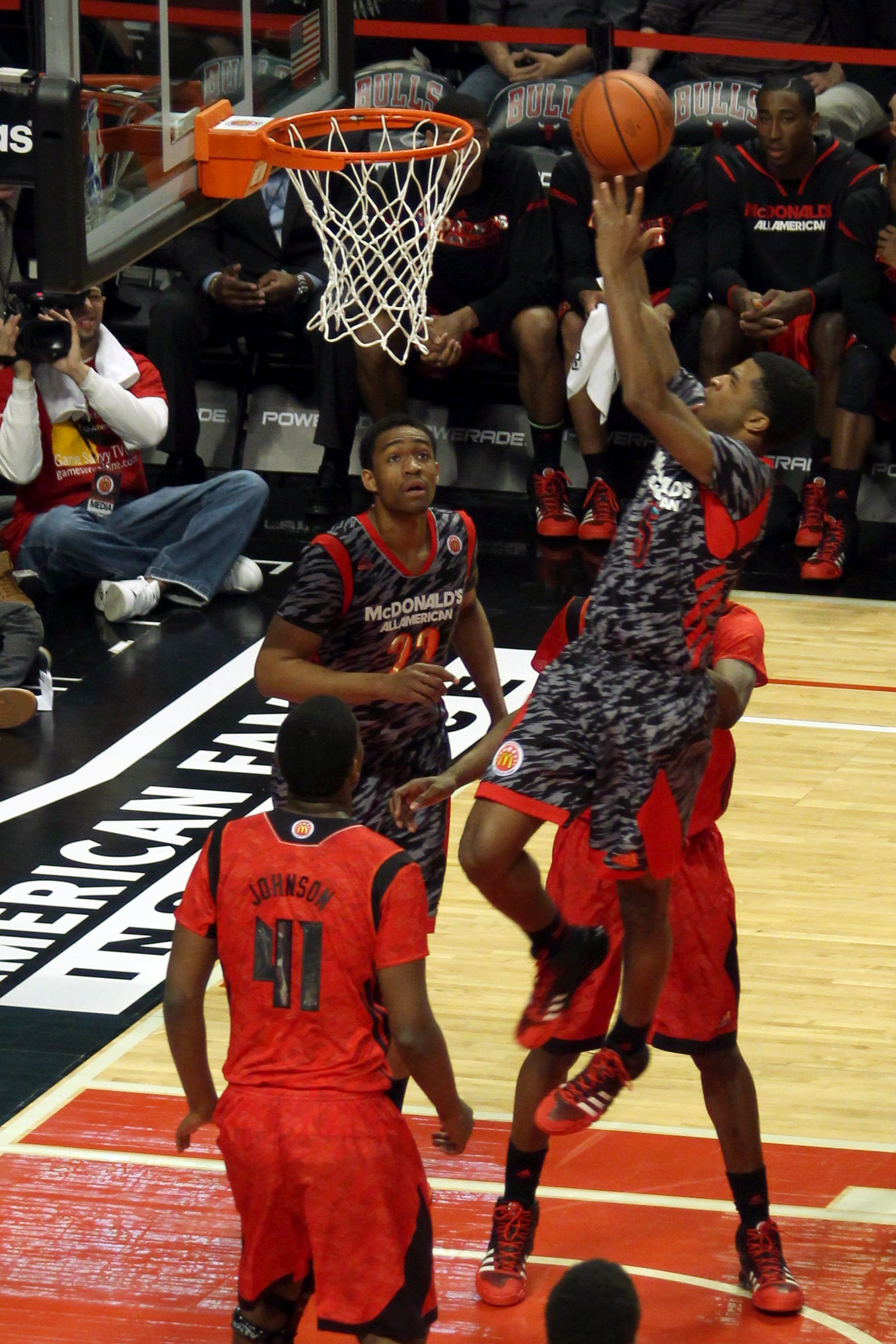
Andrew Harrison

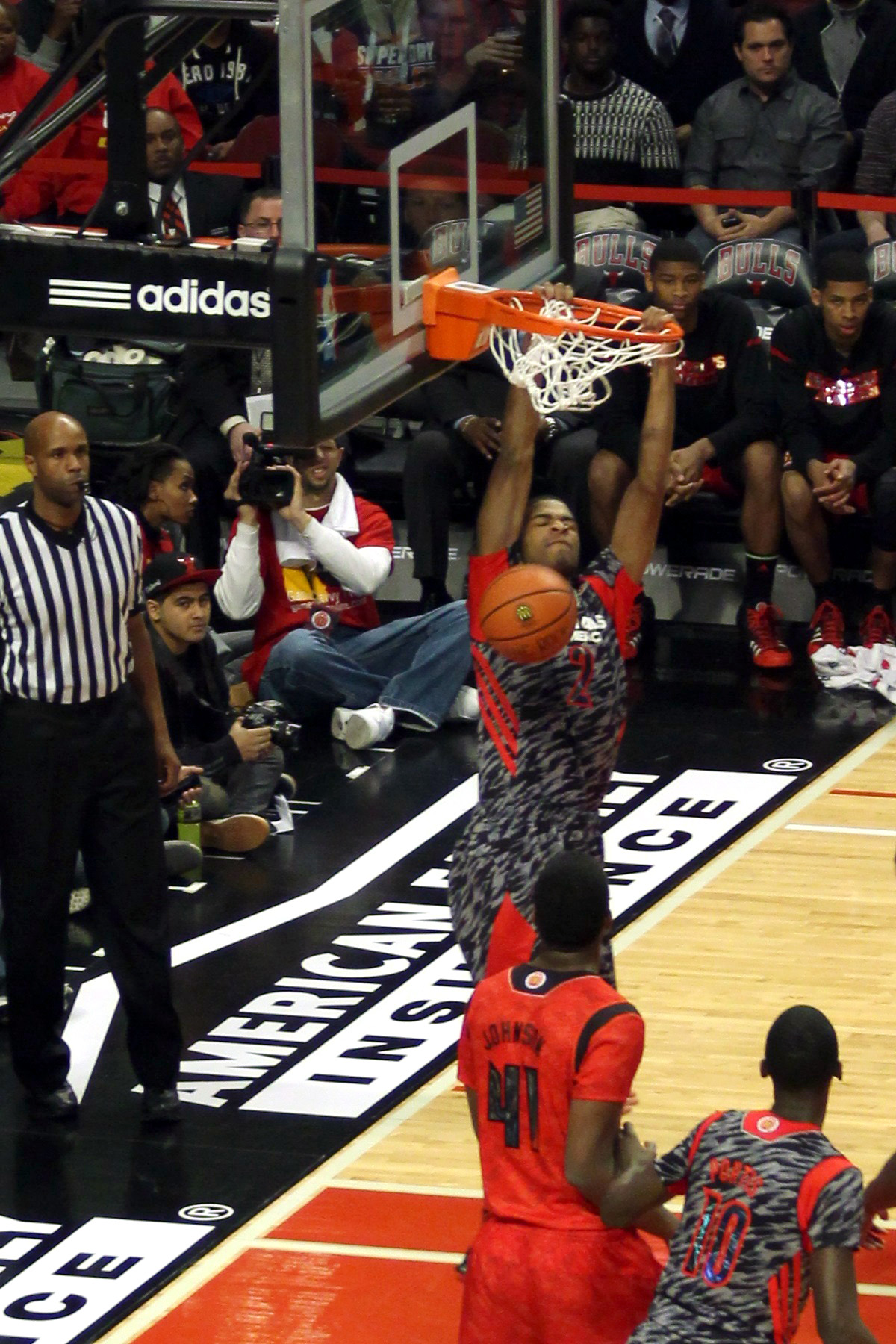
Aaron Harrison

Many recruiting analysts and experts proclaimed that the 2013 signing class for Kentucky was the greatest recruiting class since the infamous Fab Five in the 1990s. Some proclaimed that it was the greatest ever assembled. It featured a record six McDonald's All-Americans and five consensus top fifteen players.

Julius Randle, originally from Plano, Texas, was the highest rated signee in the 2013 class. He committed to Kentucky on March 18, one day after Kentucky lost to Robert Morris in the opening round of the NIT. He chose Kentucky over Kansas and Texas. He was the nation's consensus top power forward, was ranked the No. 2 overall player by Rivals, the No. 3 overall player by ESPN and the No. 5 overall player by Scout. He helped lead Prestonwood Christian to three state titles including one in his freshman year and back-to-back titles in junior and senior seasons. He was a McDonald's All-America and Jordan Brand Classic game selection. He was the co-MVP in the Jordan Brand Classic.

The Harrison twins, Aaron and Andrew, became the first set of twins to ever play for Kentucky. Andrew was the consensus top point guard and Aaron was the consensus top shooting guard in the 2013 class. Out of Richmond, Texas, the Twins committed to Kentucky on October 4, 2012, on a live broadcast on ESPNU. The Twins chose Kentucky over their Father's alma mater, Maryland. They were a McDonald's All-America and Jordan Brand Classic game selections.

James Young was a consensus top ten prospect within the 2013 class. Originally from Rochester, Michigan, he committed to Kentucky on October 11, 2012, on ESPNU. He chose Kentucky over in-state schools Michigan and Michigan State. Young was ranked as the No. 6 prospect in the class by ESPN and No. 10 by both Rivals and Scout. He was a McDonald's All-America game selection.

Dakari Johnson was the consensus top center in the 2013 class. He committed to Kentucky on January 5, live on ESPNU. He chose Kentucky over Florida and Georgetown. He was rated as the No. 11 overall player by ESPN, No. 9 overall player by Rivals, and No. 18 over all player by Scout. Johnson led his high school, Montverde, to a national championship at the National High School Invitational where he claimed MVP honors after logging 18 points and eight rebounds. He was a McDonald's All-America.

Marcus Lee was a forward and participated several sports in high school and made all-state selections in both basketball and volleyball. He committed to Kentucky on October 17, 2012, choosing Kentucky over California and Louisville. He was a McDonald's All-America and Jordan Brand Classic game selection.

Derek Willis was the first commitment in the class of 2013. Originally committed to Purdue, he opted for the Wildcats on January 20, 2012, when he was junior in high school.

Dominique Hawkins was the least heralded of all the signees in the 2013 signing class. He was the 2013 Kentucky Mr. Basketball and is the 17th player in UK history to claim the honor. He directed Madison Central to the state championship and captured most valuable player honors after averaging 20.4 points, 5.6 rebounds, 2.9 assists and 1.8 steals per game throughout the Kentucky Boys Sweet Sixteen.

College recruiting
Name	Hometown	School	Height	Weight	Commit date
Aaron Harrison; G	Richmond, Texas	Travis	6 ft 5 in (1.96 m)	205 lb (93 kg)	Oct 4, 2012
Aaron Harrison; G	Recruit ratings: Scout: Rivals: (94)				
Andrew Harrison; G	Richmond, Texas	Travis	6 ft 5 in (1.96 m)	210 lb (95 kg)	Oct 4, 2012
Andrew Harrison; G	Recruit ratings: Scout: Rivals: (96)				
Dominique Hawkins; G	Richmond, Kentucky	Madison Central	6 ft 1 in (1.85 m)	185 lb (84 kg)	Apr 10, 2013
Dominique Hawkins; G	Recruit ratings: Scout: Rivals: (72)				
Dakari Johnson; C	Brooklyn, New York	Montverde	6 ft 10 in (2.08 m)	250 lb (110 kg)	Jan 5, 2013
Dakari Johnson; C	Recruit ratings: Scout: Rivals: (95)				
Marcus Lee; F	Antioch, California	Deer Valley	6 ft 9 in (2.06 m)	200 lb (91 kg)	Oct 17, 2012
Marcus Lee; F	Recruit ratings: Scout: Rivals: (89)				
Julius Randle; F	Dallas, Texas	Prestonwood Christian	6 ft 9 in (2.06 m)	250 lb (110 kg)	Mar 20, 2013
Julius Randle; F	Recruit ratings: Scout: Rivals: (96)				
Derek Willis; F	Mount Washington, Kentucky	Bullitt East	6 ft 9 in (2.06 m)	220 lb (100 kg)	Jan 20, 2012
Derek Willis; F	Recruit ratings: Scout: Rivals: (77)				
James Young; G	Rochester, Michigan	Rochester	6 ft 6 in (1.98 m)	210 lb (95 kg)	Oct 11, 2012
James Young; G	Recruit ratings: Scout: Rivals: (94)				
Overall recruit ranking: Scout: 1 Rivals: 1 ESPN: 1
Note: In many cases, Scout, Rivals, 247Sports, On3, and ESPN may conflict in their listings of height and weight.; In these cases, the average was taken. ESPN grades are on a 100-point scale.; Sources: "Kentucky 2013 Basketball Commitments". Rivals.; "2013 Kentucky Basketball Commits". Scout.; "ESPN". ESPN.; "Scout.com Team Recruiting Rankings". Scout.; "2013 Team Ranking". Rivals.

== Pre-season ==
=== Roster ===
On March 18, 2013, Randle committed to play in the 2013–14 season. On March 31 Harrow announced he was leaving Kentucky to transfer to Georgia State for his remaining two seasons of eligibility. On April 1 Goodwin entered the 2013 NBA draft while Cauley-Stein and Wiltjer announced they were returning. On April 2, Poythress decided to return to school for his sophomore season. On April 10 Hawkins committed to play in the 2013–14 season. On April 15 Noel entered the 2013 NBA Draft. On July 19 Wiltjer announced he was leaving Kentucky to transfer to Gonzaga for his remaining two seasons of eligibility.

On June 27, 2013, Noel was selected sixth in the 2013 NBA Draft by the New Orleans Pelicans and traded to the Philadelphia Sixers for in exchange for Jrue Holiday and 42nd pick which was used to select Pierre Jackson. Goodwin was drafted 29th by the Golden State Warriors and traded to the Phoenix Suns in exchange for 30th pick which was used to select Nemanja Nedovic.

=== Off-season rankings ===
The earliest preseason predictions were made the day after the 2013 NCAA Division I men's basketball tournament on April 9, before final decisions by college players about declaring for the 2013 NBA draft and before many high-school players signed a National Letter of Intent about their 2013 seasons. With the high expectations of the talented incoming players from the 2013 signing class (Harrisons, Johnson, Lee, Randle, Young), Kentucky was projected as the top ranked team by ESPN. USA Today projected the same sentiment that the talented freshmen would make Kentucky the top team in the 2013–14 season.

On April 30, ESPN's Eamonn Brennan named Randle a third-team 2013–14 pre-offseason All-American selection. In June 2013, Sporting News' Mike DeCourcy named Cauley-Stain and Randle as the third-best players at their respective positions (center and power forward) while Poythress was named the sixth-best small forward for the upcoming season.

=== Accolades and rankings ===
The Southeastern Conference preseason media poll was released at the SEC Media Days in October, it predicted that Kentucky would win the championship and selected Randle as its Player of the Year. Randle was also named to the All-SEC First Team while Cauley-Stein, Andrew Harrison, and Johnson were named to the All-SEC Second Team.

USA Today announced its initial coaches poll on October 18, with Kentucky ranked as No. 1 in the country. The Associated Press announced on October 31 that Kentucky was ranked No. 1 to start the season in its initial poll of the season.

=== Events ===
On October 3 the camp out for Big Blue Madness, Kentucky's version of Midnight Madness, began. There were a record 755 tents set up around Memorial Coliseum to be first in line for the tickets that went on sale for Big Blue Madness on October 5. Tickets for Big Blue Madness sold out on October 5 in thirty minutes.

Big Blue Madness took place on October 18. The event debuted the team for the 2013–14 season. It included player introductions, a speech by Calipari, and a scrimmage.

The Blue-White scrimmage was the first live game for the team. It occurred at Rupp Arena on October 29. The Blue team started four freshmen, Andrew Harrison, Aaron Harrison, Young and Randle, along with Cauley-Stein. The White team opened with Jarrod Polson, Jon Hood, sophomore Poythress, Willis, and Lee. Young led all players with 21 points.

The first exhibition game was against Transylvania on November 1 at Rupp Arena. Kentucky defeated Transylvania 76 to 42. Randle notched a double-double with 16 points and 12 rebounds.

The second and final exhibition game was against Montevallo on November 4 at Rupp Arena. Kentucky defeated Montevallo 95 to 72. Randle collected 21 points and 11 rebounds, giving him a double-double in both exhibition games. Young tallied 16 points and had the play of the night when he saved the ball from going out of bounds and accidentally lofted the ball into his own defensive basket, scoring two points for Montevallo.

== 2014–15 signees ==
In November Kentucky signed another top recruiting class. John Calipari announced four players for his 2014 class during the early signing period on November 14. Trey Lyles (Indianapolis), Karl-Anthony Towns (Metuchen, N.J.), Devin Booker (Grand Rapids, Mich.) and Tyler Ulis (Chicago Heights, Ill.) all signed national letters of intent to play basketball at the University of Kentucky, starting in the 2014–15 season.

Karl-Anthony Towns was the first commitment for the class when verbally committed on December 4, 2012. He was named Gatorade National Player of the Year in 2014. He played for the Dominican Republic National Team in 2012 and 2013 which were coached by John Calipari and Kentucky assistant, Orlando Antigua. He was ranked as No. 6 overall by ESPN and No. 11 by Rivals and Scout.

Tyler Ulis was the second commitment in the class when he verbally committed on September 13, 2013. He committed to Kentucky briefly after he was offered a scholarship. Kentucky had just missed on their primary target, Emmanuel Mudiay, when he committed to SMU on August 24, 2013. Ulis, however, quickly rose the recruiting ranking finishing No. 20 overall by Scout, No. 21 overall by Rivals, and No. 25 overall by ESPN. He chose Kentucky over Iowa, Michigan State, and Southern Cal.

Devin Booker was the third commitment in the class when he verbally committed on October 31, 2013. He was ranked as the No. 18 overall by ESPN and No. 29 overall by Scout and Rivals. As a junior, he was named by Gatorade as the top basketball player in Mississippi. He is the son of the former Missouri and All-American great Melvin Booker. He chose Kentucky over his Dad's alma mater and Michigan.

Trey Lyles was the final commitment in the class when he verbally committed on November 5, 2013. After his senior season, he was named Indiana Mr. Basketball, where he led his high school to a state championship. He committed to Kentucky over rivals Indiana and Louisville. He was rated as the No. 6 overall player by ESPN, the No. 11 overall by Scout, and the No. 13 overall by Rivals.

College recruiting
Name	Hometown	School	Height	Weight	Commit date
Devin Booker; G	Grand Rapids, Michigan	Moss Point	6 ft 6 in (1.98 m)	185 lb (84 kg)	Oct 31, 2013
Devin Booker; G	Recruit ratings: Scout: Rivals: (93)				
Trey Lyles; F	Indianapolis, Indiana & Regina, Saskatchewan	Arsenal Tech	6 ft 10 in (2.08 m)	235 lb (107 kg)	Nov 5, 2013
Trey Lyles; F	Recruit ratings: Scout: Rivals: (96)				
Karl Towns; C	Metuchen, New Jersey	St. Joseph	6 ft 11 in (2.11 m)	235 lb (107 kg)	Dec 4, 2012
Karl Towns; C	Recruit ratings: Scout: Rivals: (96)				
Tyler Ulis; G	Chicago, Illinois	Marian Catholic	5 ft 8 in (1.73 m)	150 lb (68 kg)	Sep 13, 2013
Tyler Ulis; G	Recruit ratings: Scout: Rivals: (88)				
Overall recruit ranking:
Note: In many cases, Scout, Rivals, 247Sports, On3, and ESPN may conflict in their listings of height and weight.; In these cases, the average was taken. ESPN grades are on a 100-point scale.; Sources: "Kentucky 2014 Basketball Commitments". Rivals.; "2014 Kentucky Basketball Commits". Scout.; "ESPN". ESPN.; "Scout.com Team Recruiting Rankings". Scout.; "2014 Team Ranking". Rivals.

== Roster ==
2013–14 Kentucky Wildcats men's basketball team
Players
Coaches

Pos.	#	Name	Height	Weight	Year	Previous school	Hometown
PF	00	Marcus Lee	6 ft 9 in (2.06 m)	215 lb (98 kg)	Fr	Deer Valley	Antioch, California
SG	1	James Young	6 ft 7 in (2.01 m)	215 lb (98 kg)	Fr	Rochester	Rochester Hills, Michigan
SG	2	Aaron Harrison	6 ft 6 in (1.98 m)	218 lb (99 kg)	Fr	Travis	Fort Bend, Texas
PG	3	Jarrod Polson	6 ft 2 in (1.88 m)	182 lb (83 kg)	Sr	West Jessamine	Wilmore, Kentucky
SF	4	Jon Hood	6 ft 7 in (2.01 m)	215 lb (98 kg)	RS Sr	Madisonville North Hopkins	Madisonville, Kentucky
SG	5	Andrew Harrison	6 ft 6 in (1.98 m)	215 lb (98 kg)	Fr	Travis	Fort Bend, Texas
PG	13	Sam Malone	5 ft 11 in (1.8 m)	185 lb (84 kg)	Jr	Scituate	Scituate, Massachusetts
C	15	Willie Cauley-Stein (injured)	7 ft 0 in (2.13 m)	244 lb (111 kg)	So	Olathe Northwest	Olathe, Kansas
PG	21	Tod Lanter	6 ft 2 in (1.88 m)	190 lb (86 kg)	Jr	Dunbar/Gulf Coast State CC	Lexington, Kentucky
SF	22	Alex Poythress	6 ft 8 in (2.03 m)	239 lb (108 kg)	So	Northeast	Clarksville, Tennessee
PG	24	EJ Floreal	6 ft 3 in (1.91 m)	195 lb (88 kg)	Fr	Dunbar (Lexington, KY)	Palo Alto, California
PG	25	Dominique Hawkins	6 ft 0 in (1.83 m)	193 lb (88 kg)	Fr	Madison Central	Richmond, Kentucky
PF	30	Julius Randle	6 ft 9 in (2.06 m)	250 lb (113 kg)	Fr	Prestonwood Christian	Dallas, Texas
PG	32	Brian Long	5 ft 9 in (1.75 m)	155 lb (70 kg)	Jr	River Dell	Dumont, New Jersey
SF	35	Derek Willis	6 ft 9 in (2.06 m)	205 lb (93 kg)	Fr	Bullitt East	Mount Washington, Kentucky
C	44	Dakari Johnson	7 ft 0 in (2.13 m)	265 lb (120 kg)	Fr	Montverde	Brooklyn, New York

Head coach

- John Calipari (Clarion)

Assistant coach(es)

- Rod Strickland (DePaul)
- John Robic (Denison)
- Orlando Antigua (Pittsburgh)
- Kenny Payne (Louisville)

Legend

- (C) Team captain
- (S) Suspended
- (I) Ineligible
- (W) Walk-on
- Injured
- Current redshirt

=== Depth chart ===
Pos.	Starting 5	Bench 1	Bench 2
C	Willie Cauley-Stein	Dakari Johnson	Derek Willis
PF	Julius Randle	Marcus Lee	Jon Hood
SF	James Young	Alex Poythress	E.J. Floreal
SG	Aaron Harrison	Dominique Hawkins	Brian Long
PG	Andrew Harrison	Jarrod Polson	Sam Malone

== Schedule ==
=== Regular season ===
==== November ====
The season officially began on November 8 with an 89–57 victory over UNC Asheville at Rupp Arena. Randle led all scorers with 15 points and all rebounders with 15 rebounds. Two nights later, on November 10, the team squared off against in-state foe Northern Kentucky, it was the first meeting between the two schools. Kentucky prevailed 93–63 behind another strong performance from Randle. Kentucky's first challenge of the season came two nights later in Chicago at the Champions Classic against No. 2 Michigan State. November 12 was the earliest the AP No. 1 and No. 2 teams had ever met in college basketball history. Kentucky made a late rally from being down 12 at halftime but ended up losing 78–74 for their first loss of the season. Julius Randle continued to boast huge numbers by posting his third consecutive double-double, 27 points and 13 rebounds. On November 17 Kentucky avenged its 2013 NIT loss to Robert Morris at Rupp Arena winning 87–49 in the first game of the inaugural Bill Keightley Classic. Aaron Harrison led all scorers with 28, while Randle posted his fourth consecutive double double. On November 19 the Keightley Classic continued as Kentucky defeated Texas–Arlington 105–76. Young led all scorers with 26, Randle posted his fifth consecutive double double. Kentucky needed a late rally to get past Cleveland State on November 25. Cleveland State led by 10 with 7:41 to go. Kentucky went on a 24–7 run to end the game and win 68–61. Kentucky earned its 500th Rupp Arena win by beating Eastern Michigan 8163 on November 27. Kentucky's halftime lead was just 35–32, but they steadily built it to double digits with 12:52 left and led by as many as twenty-one with 2:39 remaining.

==== December ====
December 1 against Providence was the second consecutive season that Kentucky played at the Barclays Center in Brooklyn. They defeated the Friars 79 to 65 behind a near triple-double from Cauley-Stein. Playing #20 Baylor at AT&T Stadium on December 6 provided a chance for Kentucky to get an early glimpse into what it felt like playing at the site of 2014 Final Four. The game was a part of a double-header between the two schools. The Baylor and Kentucky women's teams played to four overtimes in which Kentucky won. However, the men could not complete the sweep as Baylor handed Kentucky its second loss of the season by the score of 67–62. Kentucky rebounded after the loss by defeating Boise State on December 10. The Wildcats were by another double-double by Randle and defeated the Broncos 70–55 at Rupp Arena. On December 14 Kentucky played its first road game of the season when they played No. 18 North Carolina in Chapel Hill. The series between the two programs with the most wins in college basketball resumed after a one-year hiatus in 2013. The Tar Heels handed Kentucky its third loss of the season 82–77. After a week off for finals week, Belmont visited Lexington on December 21. At one point in the first half Kentucky trailed by 10 and did not take its first lead until 14 minutes remained in the second half. Kentucky defeated Belmont 93–80. The final game of the non-conference was against in-state rival No. 6 Louisville. The game featured the two previous national champions as Kentucky won the championship in 2012 and Louisville in 2013. Behind 18 points and 10 rebounds from Young, Kentucky defeated Louisville 73–66.

=== Results ===
Date time, TV	Rank^{#}	Opponent^{#}	Result	Record	High points	High rebounds	High assists	Site (attendance) city, state
Exhibition
Nov. 1*; 7:00 pm, FSN/UK IMG	No. 1	Transylvania	W 76–42	–	16 – Randle	12 – Randle	5 – Young	Rupp Arena (20,740); Lexington, KY
Nov. 4*; 7:00 pm, FSN/UK IMG	No. 1	Montevallo	W 95–72	–	21 – Randle	11 – Randle	7 – Aa. Harrison	Rupp Arena (20,039); Lexington, KY
Non-conference regular season
Nov. 8*; 7:00 pm, FSN/UK IMG	No. 1	UNC Asheville	W 89–57	1–0	23 – Randle	16 – Randle	5 – An. Harrison	Rupp Arena (22,413); Lexington, KY
Nov. 10*; 4:00 pm, FSN/UK IMG	No. 1	Northern Kentucky	W 93–63	2–0	22 – Randle	14 – Randle	3 – Randle	Rupp Arena (22,925); Lexington, KY
Nov. 12*; 7:30 pm, ESPN	No. 1	vs. No. 2 Michigan State; Champions Classic	L 74–78	2–1	27 – Randle	13 – Randle	3 – An. Harrison	United Center (22,711); Chicago, IL
Nov. 17*; 7:00 pm, ESPN2	No. 1	Robert Morris; Keightley Classic	W 87–49	3–1	28 – Aa. Harrison	15 – Randle	3 – Tied	Rupp Arena (21,600); Lexington, KY
Nov. 19*; 7:30 pm, CSS	No. 4	Texas–Arlington; Keightley Classic	W 105–76	4–1	26 – Young	10 – Tied	6 – An. Harrison	Rupp Arena (20,305); Lexington, KY
Nov. 25*; 7:00 pm, FSN/UK IMG	No. 3	Cleveland State; Keightley Classic	W 68–61	5–1	15 – Randle	15 – Randle	5 – An. Harrison	Rupp Arena (21,067); Lexington, KY
Nov. 27*; 4:00 pm, FSN/UK IMG	No. 3	Eastern Michigan; Keightley Classic	W 81–63	6–1	22 – Aa. Harrison	10 – Randle	4 – Young	Rupp Arena (22,721); Lexington, KY
Dec. 1*; 8:30 pm, FS1	No. 3	vs. Providence	W 79–65	7–1	18 – Young	8 – Tied	4 – Tied	Barclays Center (8,086); Brooklyn, NY
Dec. 6*; 10:00 pm, ESPN	No. 3	vs. No. 20 Baylor; Big 12/SEC Challenge	L 62–67	7–2	16 – Randle	8 – Randle	6 – Tied	AT&T Stadium (12,818); Arlington, TX
Dec. 10*; 9:00 pm, ESPN	No. 11	Boise State	W 70–55	8–2	21 – Young	11 – Randle	2 – Tied	Rupp Arena (21,565); Lexington, KY
Dec. 14*; 5:15 pm, ESPN	No. 11	at No. 18 North Carolina	L 77–82	8–3	20 – Aa. Harrison	12 – Cauley-Stein	7 – An. Harrison	Dean E. Smith Center (21,750); Chapel Hill, NC
Dec. 21*; 12:00 pm, ESPNU	No. 19	Belmont	W 93–80	9–3	29 – Randle	10 – Randle	7 – Aa. Harrison	Rupp Arena (24,224); Lexington, KY
Dec. 28*; 4:00 pm, CBS	No. 18	No. 6 Louisville; Battle for the Bluegrass	W 73–66	10–3	24 – Young	10 – Tied	7 – Young	Rupp Arena (24,396); Lexington, KY
SEC regular season
Jan. 8; 8:00 pm, SEC TV	No. 14	Mississippi State	W 85–63	11–3 (1–0)	26 – Young	14 – Randle	5 – Young	Rupp Arena (23,638); Lexington, KY
Jan. 11; 1:00 pm, CBS	No. 14	at Vanderbilt	W 71–62	12–3 (2–0)	15 – Cauley-Stein	11 – Randle	4 – Tied	Memorial Gymnasium (14,316); Nashville, TN
Jan. 14; 9:00 pm, ESPN	No. 13	at Arkansas	L 85–87 ^{OT}	12–4 (2–1)	23 – Young	14 – Randle	6 – An. Harrison	Bud Walton Arena (18,386); Fayetteville, AR
Jan. 18; 12:00 pm, CBS	No. 13	Tennessee	W 74–66	13–4 (3–1)	26 – An. Harrison	4 – Tied	4 – Randle	Rupp Arena (24,246); Lexington, KY
Jan. 21; 9:00 pm, ESPN	No. 14	Texas A&M	W 68–51	14–4 (4–1)	16 – Poythress	11 – Randle	4 – An. Harrison	Rupp Arena (22,634); Lexington, KY
Jan. 25; 1:30 pm, SEC TV	No. 14	Georgia	W 79–54	15–4 (5–1)	15 – Aa. Harrison	9 – Randle	5 – An. Harrison	Rupp Arena (23,367); Lexington, KY
Jan. 28; 9:00 pm, ESPN	No. 11	at LSU	L 82–87	15–5 (5–2)	23 – Young	7 – Tied	2 – Young	Maravich Center (12,124); Baton Rouge, LA
Feb. 1; 1:00 pm, CBS	No. 11	at Missouri	W 84–79	16–5 (6–2)	21 – Aa. Harrison	9 – Randle	4 – An. Harrison	Mizzou Arena (11,742); Columbia, MO
Feb. 4; 7:00 pm, ESPNU	No. 18	Ole Miss	W 84–60	17–5 (7–2)	18 – Cauley-Stein	11 – Cauley-Stein	5 – An. Harrison	Rupp Arena (22,168); Lexington, KY
Feb. 8; 1:30 pm, SEC TV	No. 18	at Mississippi State	W 69–59	18–5 (8–2)	16 – Randle	8 – Johnson	6 – Aa. Harrison	Humphrey Coliseum (8,417); Starkville, MS
Feb. 12; 8:00 pm, SEC TV	No. 14	at Auburn	W 64–56	19–5 (9–2)	16 – An. Harrison	12 – Randle	2 – An. Harrison	Auburn Arena (7,959); Auburn, AL
Feb. 15; 9:00 pm, ESPN	No. 14	No. 3 Florida; ESPN College GameDay	L 59–69	19–6 (9–3)	20 – An. Harrison	13 – Randle	4 – An. Harrison	Rupp Arena (24,425); Lexington, KY
Feb. 18; 7:00 pm, ESPN	No. 18	at Ole Miss	W 84–70	20–6 (10–3)	25 – Randle	13 – Randle	5 – Young	Tad Smith Coliseum (8,476); Oxford, MS
Feb. 22; 4:00 pm, ESPN	No. 18	LSU	W 77–76 ^{OT}	21–6 (11–3)	21 – Aa. Harrison	15 – Randle	4 – An. Harrison	Rupp Arena (24,244); Lexington, KY
Feb. 27; 7:00 pm, ESPN	No. 17	Arkansas	L 67–71 ^{OT}	21–7 (11–4)	16 – Cauley-Stein	13 – Cauley-Stein	3 – Tied	Rupp Arena (23,908); Lexington, KY
Mar. 1; 6:00 pm, ESPN2	No. 17	at South Carolina	L 67–72	21–8 (11–5)	21 – Aa. Harrison	15 – Randle	4 – An. Harrison	Colonial Life Arena (15,303); Columbia, SC
Mar. 4; 9:00 pm, ESPN	No. 25	Alabama; Senior Night	W 55–48	22–8 (12–5)	12 – Randle	11 – Randle	3 – Tied	Rupp Arena (23,504); Lexington, KY
Mar. 8; 12:00 pm, CBS	No. 25	at No. 1 Florida	L 65–84	22–9 (12–6)	16 – Randle	10 – Randle	5 – An. Harrison	O'Connell Center (12,604); Gainesville, FL
SEC Tournament
Mar. 14; 7:00 pm, SEC TV	(2)	vs. (7) LSU; Quarterfinals	W 85–67	23–9	21 – Young	16 – Randle	8 – An. Harrison	Georgia Dome (N/A); Atlanta, GA
Mar. 15; 7:00 pm, ABC	(2)	vs. (3) Georgia; Semifinals	W 70–58	24–9	22 – Aa. Harrison	11 – Randle	9 – An. Harrison	Georgia Dome (N/A); Atlanta, GA
Mar. 16; 3:00 pm, ESPN	(2)	vs. (1) No. 1 Florida; Championship game	L 60–61	24–10	16 – Aa. Harrison	11 – Cauley-Stein	2 – Tied	Georgia Dome (21,021); Atlanta, GA
NCAA tournament
Mar. 21*; 9:40 pm, CBS	(8 MW)	vs. (9 MW) Kansas State; Second round	W 56–49	25–10	19 – Randle	15 – Randle	5 – An. Harrison	Scottrade Center (19,223); St. Louis, MO
Mar. 23*; 2:45 pm, CBS	(8 MW)	vs. (1 MW) No. 2 Wichita State; Third round	W 78–76	26–10	20 – An. Harrison	10 – Randle	6 – Randle	Scottrade Center (19,676); St. Louis, MO
Mar. 28*; 9:45 pm, CBS	(8 MW)	vs. (4 MW) No. 5 Louisville; Sweet Sixteen	W 74–69	27–10	15 – Tied	12 – Randle	7 – An. Harrison	Lucas Oil Stadium (41,072); Indianapolis, IN
Mar. 30*; 5:05 pm, CBS	(8 MW)	vs. (2 MW) No. 7 Michigan; Elite Eight	W 75–72	28–10	16 – Randle	11 – Randle	6 – An. Harrison	Lucas Oil Stadium (35,551); Indianapolis, IN
Apr. 5*; 8:49 pm, TBS	(8 MW)	vs. (2 W) No. 12 Wisconsin; Final Four	W 74–73	29–10	17 – Young	7 – Tied	4 – An. Harrison	AT&T Stadium (79,444); Arlington, TX
Apr. 7*; 9:10 pm, CBS	(8 MW)	vs. (7 E) No. 18 UConn; National Championship	L 54–60	29–11	20 – Young	7 – Young	5 – An. Harrison	AT&T Stadium (79,238); Arlington, TX
*Non-conference game. ^{#}Rankings from AP poll. (#) Tournament seedings in parentheses. MW=Midwest region, W=West region, E=East region. All times are in Eastern Time.

== Statistics ==
The team posted the following statistics:

Name	GP	GS	Min.	Avg.	FG	FGA	FG%	3FG	3FGA	3FG%	FT	FTA	FT%	OR	DR	RB	Avg.	PF	DQ	Ast.	TO	Stl.	Blk.	Pts.	Avg.
Julius Randle	40	40	1,233	30.8	196	392	0.500	3	18	0.167	204	289	0.706	140	277	417	10.4	91	1	57	101	31	20	599	15.0
James Young	40	39	1,296	32.4	193	450	0.407	82	235	0.349	125	177	0.706	41	130	171	4.3	83	2	67	75	8	30	573	14.3
Aaron Harrison	40	40	1,303	32.6	174	411	0.423	62	174	0.356	139	176	0.790	25	93	118	3.0	85	2	74	65	12	43	549	13.7
Andrew Harrison	40	39	1,267	31.7	121	330	0.367	33	94	0.351	159	208	0.764	32	94	126	3.2	119	3	159	109	9	21	434	10.9
Willie Cauley-Stein	37	18	880	23.8	106	178	0.596	0	0	0.000	40	83	0.482	94	131	225	6.1	98	2	25	31	106	44	252	6.8
Alex Poythress	40	0	734	18.4	88	177	0.497	8	33	0.242	50	80	0.625	72	109	181	4.5	85	2	17	38	29	12	234	5.9
Dakari Johnson	39	18	550	14.1	82	144	0.569	0	0	0.000	38	85	0.447	79	75	154	3.9	79	1	11	25	23	9	202	5.2
Marcus Lee	25	4	157	6.3	26	42	0.619	0	0	0.000	7	16	0.438	21	15	36	1.4	19	0	2	4	14	0	59	2.4
Jon Hood	13	1	47	3.6	4	13	0.308	3	10	0.300	4	4	1.000	1	3	4	0.3	5	0	5	4	0	2	15	1.2
Derek Willis	14	0	39	2.8	3	9	0.333	1	6	0.167	9	12	0.750	1	7	8	0.6	0	0	0	4	0	1	16	1.1
Jarrod Polson	33	1	281	8.5	11	36	0.306	9	5	0.360	1	3	0.333	5	16	21	0.6	26	0	17	9	2	2	32	1.0
Dominique Hawkins	33	0	283	8.6	9	31	0.290	2	16	0.125	5	13	0.385	7	16	23	0.7	37	0	12	6	1	4	25	0.8
E.J. Floreal	3	0	4	1.3	1	1	1.000	0	0	0.000	0	0	0.000	0	1	1	0.3	1	0	0	0	1	1	2	0.7
Sam Malone	1	0	0	0.0	0	0	0.000	0	0	0.000	0	0	0.000	0	0	0	0.0	0	0	0	0	0	0	0	0.0
Brian Long	1	0	1	1.0	0	0	0.000	0	0	0.000	0	0	0.000	0	0	0	0.0	0	0	0	0	0	0	0	0.0
TEAM	40													56	67	123	3.1	4			10				
Season Total	40	—	8,075	—	1,004	2,214	0.453	203	611	0.332	781	1,146	0.682	574	1,034	1,608	40.2	732	13	446	481	236	189	2,992	74.8
Opponents	40	—	8,075	—	933	2,271	0.411	222	689	0.322	577	836	0.690	437	794	1,231	30.8	884	—	416	428	123	232	2,665	66.6

== Honors ==
The team was given a lot of individual honors during the season.

At SEC Media Days in October, the SEC media selected Randle as its pick to win the SEC Player of the Year award. Randle was also named to the All-SEC First Team while Cauley-Stein, Andrew Harrison, and Johnson were named to the All-SEC Second Team.

To begin the season Andrew Harrison was placed on the Bob Cousy Award watch list with 45 other players from across the country, which recognizes the best point guard. Randle was placed on the Oscar Robertson Trophy watch list with 15 other players from across the country. The Harrison twins, Randle, and Young were among ten freshmen that were placed on the Wayman Tisdale Award watch list, which is given to the top freshman in the country. Andrew Harrison, Randle, and Young were among 50 players named to the Naismith Trophy watch list, which goes to the National Player of the Year.

During the season Randle earned SEC Player of the Week honors on November 11 after his first two games, averaging 22.5 points and 15.0 rebound per game. On January 27 he was named SEC Freshman of the Week after averaging 13.5 points and 10.0 rebounds in wins over Texas A&M and Georgia. He was again named SEC Player of the Week on February 24 after averaging 16.5 points and 14.0 rebounds in two victories over LSU and Ole Miss. In addition to winning SEC Player of the Week on February 24, Randle became the first player in 2014 to be honored by the USBWA as its Oscar Robertson National Player of the Week and its Wayman Tisdale National Freshman of the Week. Randle was among ten semifinalists for the Naismith Trophy. Randle was also named as one of 15 finalists for the John R. Wooden Award.

Young also earned USBWA National Freshman of the Week on December 31 after the win over Louisville. Randle was not the only Kentucky player to be honored with SEC Freshman of the Week during the season. On November 25 Young was honored with weekly award after scoring 26 points in a win over UT-Arlington. Aaron Harrison was honored twice with the award on December 2 and December 23.

There were several postseason awards that were handed out to Kentucky players. On March 11 the SEC honored Randle as its Freshman of the Year, joining DeMarcus Cousins (2010), Terrence Jones (2011), Anthony Davis (2012) and Nerlens Noel (2013) as recent Wildcats to win the award. Randle was also named to the First All-SEC team while Young was named to the Second All-SEC team. Both were a part of the SEC All-Freshman team, too. Cauley-Stein was honored with the SEC All-Defensive team.

== Rankings ==
Ranking movements Legend: ██ Increase in ranking ██ Decrease in ranking RV = Received votes
	Week																				
Poll	Pre	2	3	4	5	6	7	8	9	10	11	12	13	14	15	16	17	18	19	20	Final
AP	1	1	4	3	3	11	19	18	15	14	13	14	11	18	14	18	17	25	RV	RV	N/A*
Coaches	1	1	5	4	4	10	21	18	16	16	12	14	11	14	13	16	15	24	RV	22	2

== Departures ==
=== 2014 NBA draft ===
Within two weeks after the season ended Young and Randle declared for the 2014 NBA draft. They became the 11th and 12th freshmen players to declare for the NBA draft under Calipari. Young declared for the NBA draft on April 17. He was projected as a player that could potentially be a lottery pick. Randle declared for the on April 22. This was not a surprise due to Randle being projected as a top-5 pick during the season.

=== NBA draft selections ===
Year	Round	Pick	Overall	Player	NBA club
2014	1	7	7	Julius Randle	Los Angeles Lakers
2014	1	17	17	James Young	Boston Celtics

== See also ==
- 2013–14 Kentucky Wildcats women's basketball team
