= 2012–13 Kentucky Wildcats men's basketball team =

2012–13 season of University of Kentucky men's basketball team

2012–13 Kentucky Wildcats men's basketball

NIT, first round
- Conference: Southeastern Conference
- Record: 21–12 (12–6 SEC)
- Head coach: John Calipari (4th season)
- Assistant coaches: John Robic (4th season); Orlando Antigua (4th season); Kenny Payne (3rd season)
- Home arena: Rupp Arena

2012–13 Southeastern Conference men's basketball standings
	Conf.				Overall
Team	W		L	PCT	W		L	PCT
No. 14 Florida	14	–	4	.778	29	–	8	.784
Ole Miss †	12	–	6	.667	27	–	9	.750
Alabama	12	–	6	.667	23	–	13	.639
Kentucky	12	–	6	.667	21	–	12	.636
Missouri	11	–	7	.611	23	–	11	.676
Tennessee	11	–	7	.611	20	–	13	.606
Arkansas	10	–	8	.556	19	–	13	.594
LSU	9	–	9	.500	19	–	12	.613
Georgia	9	–	9	.500	15	–	17	.469
Vanderbilt	8	–	10	.444	16	–	17	.485
Texas A&M	7	–	11	.389	18	–	15	.545
South Carolina	4	–	14	.222	14	–	18	.438
Mississippi State	4	–	14	.222	10	–	22	.313
Auburn	3	–	15	.167	9	–	23	.281
† 2013 SEC tournament winner As of March 31, 2013; Rankings from AP poll

The 2012–13 Kentucky Wildcats men's basketball team represented the University of Kentucky in the 2012–13 college basketball season. The team's head coach was John Calipari, who was in his fourth season. They played their home games at Rupp Arena and were members of the Southeastern Conference. They finished the season 21–12, 12–6 in SEC play to finish in a three-way tie for second place. They lost in the quarterfinals of the SEC tournament to Vanderbilt. They were invited to the 2013 NIT where they lost in the first round to Robert Morris.

== Pre-season ==
=== Departures ===
Name	Number	Pos.	Height	Weight	Year	Hometown	Notes
Darius Miller	1	G	6'8"	235	Senior	Maysville, Kentucky	Graduated/Entered 2012 NBA draft
Terrence Jones	3	F	6'9"	252	Sophomore	Portland, Oregon	Entered 2012 NBA draft
Michael Kidd-Gilchrist	14	F	6'7"	232	Freshman	Somerdale, New Jersey	Entered 2012 NBA draft
Doron Lamb	20	G	6'4"	210	Sophomore	Queens, New York	Entered 2012 NBA draft
Anthony Davis	23	C	6'10"	220	Freshman	Chicago, Illinois	Entered 2012 NBA draft
Marquis Teague	25	G	6'2"	189	Freshman	Indianapolis, Indiana	Entered 2012 NBA draft
Eloy Vargas	30	C	6'11"	244	Senior	Moca, Dominican Republic	Graduated

=== Class of 2012 signees ===
College recruiting information
Name	Hometown	School	Height	Weight	Commit date
Willie Cauley-Stein; C	Spearville, Kansas	Olathe Northwest	7 ft 0 in (2.13 m)	215 lb (98 kg)	Oct 31, 2011
Willie Cauley-Stein; C	Recruit ratings: Scout: Rivals: (95)				
Archie Goodwin; G	Sherwood, Arkansas	Sylvan Hills	6 ft 4 in (1.93 m)	181 lb (82 kg)	Sep 20, 2011
Archie Goodwin; G	Recruit ratings: Scout: Rivals: (97)				
Nerlens Noel; C	Everett, Massachusetts	Tilton School	6 ft 10 in (2.08 m)	215 lb (98 kg)	Apr 11, 2012
Nerlens Noel; C	Recruit ratings: Scout: Rivals: (98)				
Alex Poythress; F	Clarksville, Tennessee	Northeast	6 ft 7 in (2.01 m)	215 lb (98 kg)	Nov 10, 2011
Alex Poythress; F	Recruit ratings: Scout: Rivals: (97)				
Overall recruit ranking: Scout: #1 Rivals: #1 ESPN: #2
Note: In many cases, Scout, Rivals, 247Sports, On3, and ESPN may conflict in their listings of height and weight.; In these cases, the average was taken. ESPN grades are on a 100-point scale.; Sources: "Kentucky 2012 Basketball Commitments". Rivals.; "2012 Kentucky Basketball Commits". Scout.; "ESPN". ESPN.; "Scout.com Team Recruiting Rankings". Scout.; "2012 Team Ranking". Rivals.

=== Class of 2013 commitments ===
College recruiting information (2013)
Name	Hometown	School	Height	Weight	Commit date
Aaron Harrison; SG	Richmond, Texas	Travis	6 ft 5 in (1.96 m)	205 lb (93 kg)	Oct 4, 2012
Aaron Harrison; SG	Recruit ratings: Scout: Rivals: (95)				
Andrew Harrison; PG	Richmond, Texas	Travis	6 ft 5 in (1.96 m)	210 lb (95 kg)	Oct 4, 2012
Andrew Harrison; PG	Recruit ratings: Scout: Rivals: (96)				
Dakari Johnson; C	New York, New York	Montverde	6 ft 10 in (2.08 m)	425 lb (193 kg)	Jan 5, 2013
Dakari Johnson; C	Recruit ratings: Scout: Rivals: (92)				
Marcus Lee; PF	Antioch, California	Deer Valley	6 ft 9 in (2.06 m)	200 lb (91 kg)	Oct 17, 2012
Marcus Lee; PF	Recruit ratings: Scout: Rivals: (89)				
Julius Randle; PF	Dallas, Texas	Prestonwood	6 ft 9 in (2.06 m)	250 lb (110 kg)	Mar 20, 2013
Julius Randle; PF	Recruit ratings: Scout: Rivals: (96)				
Derek Willis; PF	Mount Washington, Kentucky	Bullitt East	6 ft 9 in (2.06 m)	220 lb (100 kg)	Jan 20, 2012
Derek Willis; PF	Recruit ratings: Scout: Rivals: (77)				
James Young; SG	Rochester, Michigan	Rochester	6 ft 6 in (1.98 m)	210 lb (95 kg)	Oct 11, 2012
James Young; SG	Recruit ratings: Scout: Rivals: (95)				
Overall recruit ranking:
Note: In many cases, Scout, Rivals, 247Sports, On3, and ESPN may conflict in their listings of height and weight.; In these cases, the average was taken. ESPN grades are on a 100-point scale.; Sources: "Kentucky 2013 Basketball Commitments". Rivals.; "2013 Kentucky Basketball Commits". Scout.; "ESPN". ESPN.; "Scout.com Team Recruiting Rankings". Scout.; "2013 Team Ranking". Rivals.

=== Class of 2014 commitments ===
College recruiting information (2014)
Name	Hometown	School	Height	Weight	Commit date
Karl-Anthony Towns; C	Pisctaway, New Jersey	St. Joseph	6 ft 11 in (2.11 m)	235 lb (107 kg)	Dec 4, 2012
Karl-Anthony Towns; C	Recruit ratings: Scout: Rivals: (96)				
Devin Booker; SG	Grand Rapids, Michigan	Moss Point	6 ft 6 in (1.98 m)	185 lb (84 kg)	Oct 31, 2013
Devin Booker; SG	Recruit ratings: Scout: Rivals: (93)				
Trey Lyles; PF	Indianapolis, Indiana & Regina, Saskatchewan	Arsenal Tech	6 ft 10 in (2.08 m)	235 lb (107 kg)	Nov 5, 2013
Trey Lyles; PF	Recruit ratings: Scout: Rivals: (96)				
Tyler Ulis; PG	Chicago, Illinois	Marian	5 ft 8 in (1.73 m)	150 lb (68 kg)	Sep 13, 2013
Tyler Ulis; PG	Recruit ratings: Scout: Rivals: (88)				
Overall recruit ranking:
Note: In many cases, Scout, Rivals, 247Sports, On3, and ESPN may conflict in their listings of height and weight.; In these cases, the average was taken. ESPN grades are on a 100-point scale.; Sources: "Kentucky 2014 Basketball Commitments". Rivals.; "2014 Kentucky Basketball Commits". Scout.; "ESPN". ESPN.; "Scout.com Team Recruiting Rankings". Scout.; "2014 Team Ranking". Rivals.

== Roster ==
2012–13 Kentucky Wildcats men's basketball team
Players
Coaches

Pos.	#	Name	Height	Weight	Year	Previous school	Hometown
C	3	Nerlens Noel (injured)	6 ft 10 in (2.08 m)	228 lb (103 kg)	Fr	Tilton School	Everett, MA
SF	4	Jon Hood	6 ft 7 in (2.01 m)	212 lb (96 kg)	RS Jr	Madisonville North Hopkins	Madisonville, KY
SG	5	Jarrod Polson	6 ft 2 in (1.88 m)	189 lb (86 kg)	Jr	West Jessamine	Wilmore, KY
SG	10	Archie Goodwin	6 ft 4 in (1.93 m)	198 lb (90 kg)	Fr	Sylvan Hills	Sherwood, AR
SG	11	Twany Beckham	6 ft 4 in (1.93 m)	202 lb (92 kg)	RS Sr	Ballard/Mississippi State	Louisville, KY
PG	12	Ryan Harrow	6 ft 2 in (1.88 m)	170 lb (77 kg)	RS So	Walton/NC State	Marietta, GA
PG	13	Sam Malone	5 ft 11 in (1.8 m)	185 lb (84 kg)	So	Scituate	Scituate, MA
C	15	Willie Cauley-Stein	7 ft 0 in (2.13 m)	244 lb (111 kg)	Fr	Olathe Northwest	Olathe, KS
PG	21	Tod Lanter	6 ft 2 in (1.88 m)	189 lb (86 kg)	So	Dunbar	Lexington, KY
SF	22	Alex Poythress	6 ft 7 in (2.01 m)	239 lb (108 kg)	Fr	Northeast	Clarksville, TN
PG	32	Brian Long	5 ft 9 in (1.75 m)	155 lb (70 kg)	So	River Dell	Dumont, NJ
PF	33	Kyle Wiltjer	6 ft 10 in (2.08 m)	239 lb (108 kg)	So	Jesuit	Portland, OR
PG	34	Julius Mays	6 ft 2 in (1.88 m)	192 lb (87 kg)	GS	Marion/Wright State	Marion IN

Head coach

- John Calipari (Clarion)

Assistant coach(es)

- John Robic (Denison)
- Orlando Antigua (Pittsburgh)
- Kenny Payne (Louisville)

Legend

- (C) Team captain
- (S) Suspended
- (I) Ineligible
- (W) Walk-on
- Injured
- Current redshirt

=== Depth chart ===
Pos.	Starting 5	Bench 1	Bench 2	Bench 3
C	Nerlens Noel	Willie Cauley-Stein
PF	Alex Poythress	Kyle Wiltjer
SF	Archie Goodwin		Twany Beckham
SG	Julius Mays	Jon Hood	Tod Lanter	Brian Long
PG	Ryan Harrow	Jarrod Polson		Sam Malone

== Schedule and results ==
Date time, TV	Rank^{#}	Opponent^{#}	Result	Record	High points	High rebounds	High assists	Site (attendance) city, state
Exhibition
Nov. 1, 2012*; 7:00 pm, FSN/UK IMG	No. 3	Northwood (FL)	W 93–61	0–0	22 – Goodwin	11 – Noel	5 – Tied	Rupp Arena (20,073); Lexington, KY
Nov. 5, 2012*; 8:00 pm, FSN/UK IMG	No. 3	Transylvania	W 74–28	0–0	15 – Noel	6 – Goodwin	4 – Harrow	Rupp Arena (20,769); Lexington, KY
Non-conference regular season
Nov. 9, 2012*; 8:30 pm, ESPN	No. 3	vs. Maryland; Barclays Center Classic	W 72–69	1–0	19 – Wiltjer	9 – Noel	3 – Polson	Barclays Center (17,732); Brooklyn, NY
Nov. 13, 2012*; 9:30 pm, ESPN	No. 3	vs. No. 9 Duke; Champions Classic	L 68–75	1–1	20 – Poythress	8 – Tied	4 – Tied	Georgia Dome (22,847); Atlanta, GA
Nov. 16, 2012*; 7:00 pm, FSN/UK IMG	No. 3	Lafayette; Barclays Center Classic	W 101–49	2–1	23 – Wiltjer	7 – Noel	10 – Mays	Rupp Arena (21,360); Lexington, KY
Nov. 21, 2012*; 7:00 pm, FSN/UK IMG	No. 8	Morehead State; Barclays Center Classic	W 81–70	3–1	28 – Goodwin	11 – Noel	4 – Tied	Rupp Arena (21,897); Lexington, KY
Nov. 23, 2012*; 7:00 pm, FSN/UK IMG	No. 8	Long Island; Barclays Center Classic	W 104–75	4–1	22 – Tied	9 – Tied	9 – Goodwin	Rupp Arena (22,222); Lexington, KY
Nov. 29, 2012*; 7:00 pm, ESPN2	No. 8	at Notre Dame; SEC–Big East Challenge	L 50–64	4–2	16 – Mays	7 – Tied	5 – Goodwin	Joyce Center (9,149); South Bend, IN
Dec. 1, 2012*; 12:30 pm, CBS	No. 8	Baylor	L 55–64	4–3	17 – Goodwin	16 – Noel	5 – Goodwin	Rupp Arena (24,192); Lexington, KY
Dec. 4, 2012*; 7:00 pm, FSN/ESPN3		Samford	W 88–56	5–3	18 – Goodwin	12 – Cauley-Stein	5 – Mays	Rupp Arena (21,221); Lexington, KY
Dec. 8, 2012*; 12:00 pm, ESPN2		Portland	W 74–46	6–3	15 – Tied	9 – Noel	6 – Harrow	Rupp Arena (22,285); Lexington, KY
Dec. 15, 2012*; 12:30 pm, FSN/ESPN3		Lipscomb	W 88–50	7–3	23 – Wiltjer	12 – Wiltjer	4 – Tied	Rupp Arena (21,323); Lexington, KY
Dec. 22, 2012*; 4:00 pm, ESPN2		Marshall	W 82–54	8–3	23 – Harrow	10 – Noel	5 – Mays	Rupp Arena (24,271); Lexington, KY
Dec. 29, 2012*; 4:00 pm, CBS		at No. 4 Louisville; Battle for the Bluegrass	L 77–80	8–4	22 – Goodwin	8 – Tied	3 – Harrow	KFC Yum! Center (22,810); Louisville, KY
Jan. 2, 2013*; 6:00 pm, ESPNU		Eastern Michigan	W 90–38	9–4	17 – Wiltjer	13 – Noel	8 – Harrow	Rupp Arena (22,135); Lexington, KY
SEC regular season
Jan. 10, 2013; 9:00 pm, ESPN		at Vanderbilt	W 60–58	10–4 (1–0)	16 – Harrow	8 – Cauley-Stein	4 – Tied	Memorial Gymnasium (14,316); Nashville, TN
Jan. 12, 2013; 4:00 pm, SEC Network/ESPN3		Texas A&M	L 71–83	10–5 (1–1)	17 – Goodwin	11 – Noel	6 – Noel	Rupp Arena (24,193); Lexington, KY
Jan. 15, 2013; 7:00 pm, ESPN		Tennessee	W 75–65	11–5 (2–1)	17 – Wiltjer	9 – Noel	4 – Harrow	Rupp Arena (24,033); Lexington, KY
Jan. 19, 2013; 9:00 pm, ESPNU		at Auburn	W 75–53	12–5 (3–1)	17 – Wiltjer	9 – Noel	8 – Harrow	Auburn Arena (9,121); Auburn, AL
Jan. 22, 2013; 9:00 pm, ESPN		at Alabama	L 55–59	12–6 (3–2)	14 – Wiltjer	13 – Noel	2 – Tied	Coleman Coliseum (15,383); Tuscaloosa, AL
Jan. 26, 2013; 4:00 pm, SECN/ESPN3		LSU	W 75–70	13–6 (4–2)	20 – Poythress	12 – Poythress	2 – Tied	Rupp Arena (24,248); Lexington, KY
Jan. 29, 2013; 9:00 pm, ESPN		at No. 16 Ole Miss	W 87–74	14–6 (5–2)	26 – Wiltjer	7 – Tied	4 – Tied	Tad Smith Coliseum (9,232); Oxford, MS
Feb. 2, 2013; 6:00 pm, ESPN		at Texas A&M	W 72–68 ^{OT}	15–6 (6–2)	19 – Tied	14 – Noel	3 – Tied	Reed Arena (10,558); College Station, TX
Feb. 5, 2013; 9:00 pm, ESPNU		South Carolina	W 77–55	16–6 (7–2)	15 – Mays	10 – Noel	4 – Tied	Rupp Arena (22,559); Lexington, KY
Feb. 9, 2013; 4:00 pm, SECN/ESPN3		Auburn	W 72–62	17–6 (8–2)	14 – Wiltjer	12 – Noel	2 – Tied	Rupp Arena (24,253); Lexington, KY
Feb. 12, 2013; 7:00 pm, ESPN	No. 25	at No. 7 Florida	L 52–69	17–7 (8–3)	10 – Tied	6 – Tied	3 – Tied	O'Connell Center (12,480); Gainesville, FL
Feb. 16, 2013; 1:00 pm, CBS	No. 25	at Tennessee	L 58–88	17–8 (8–4)	18 – Wiltjer	6 – Wiltjer	4 – Goodwin	Thompson-Boling Arena (21,678); Knoxville, TN
Feb. 20, 2013; 8:00 pm, SECN/ESPN3		Vanderbilt	W 74–70	18–8 (9–4)	20 – Cauley-Stein	7 – Cauley-Stein	6 – Mays	Rupp Arena (22,887); Lexington, KY
Feb. 23, 2013; 9:00 pm, ESPN		Missouri; College GameDay	W 90–83 ^{OT}	19–8 (10–4)	24 – Mays	12 – Cauley-Stein	6 – Harrow	Rupp Arena (24,380); Lexington, KY
Feb. 27, 2013; 8:00 pm, SECN		Mississippi State	W 85–55	20–8 (11–4)	19 – Harrow	8 – Cauley-Stein	4 – Tied	Rupp Arena (24,023); Lexington, KY
Mar. 2, 2013; 4:00 pm, CBS		at Arkansas	L 60–73	20–9 (11–5)	14 – Goodwin	10 – Cauley-Stein	2 – Tied	Bud Walton Arena (18,139); Fayetteville, AR
Mar. 7, 2013; 7:00 pm, ESPN		at Georgia	L 62–72	20–10 (11–6)	20 – Goodwin	11 – Cauley-Stein	3 – Poythress	Stegeman Coliseum (10,062); Athens, GA
Mar. 9, 2013; 12:00 pm, CBS		No. 11 Florida	W 61–57	21–10 (12–6)	16 – Goodwin	12 – Poythress	2 – Tied	Rupp Arena (24,294); Lexington, KY
SEC Tournament
Mar. 15, 2013; 7:30 p.m., SECN/ESPN3	(2)	vs. (10) Vanderbilt; Quarterfinals	L 48–64	21–11	12 – Goodwin	9 – Cauley-Stein	3 – Mays	Bridgestone Arena (18,192); Nashville, TN
National Invitation Tournament
Mar. 19, 2013*; 7:30 p.m., ESPN	(1)	at (8) Robert Morris; First Round	L 57–59	21–12	18 – Goodwin	7 – Goodwin	3 – Polson	Charles L. Sewall Center (3,444); Moon Township, PA
*Non-conference game. ^{#}Rankings from AP poll. (#) Tournament seedings in parentheses. All times are in Eastern Time.

== Rankings ==
Ranking movements Legend: ██ Increase in ranking ██ Decrease in ranking — = Not ranked RV = Received votes
	Week																			
Poll	Pre	1	2	3	4	5	6	7	8	9	10	11	12	13	14	15	16	17	18	Final
AP	3	3	8	8	RV	RV	RV	RV	RV	RV	RV	—	—	—	RV	25	—	—		
Coaches	3	3	7	8	19	22	23	23	RV	RV	RV	—	—	—	RV	RV	RV	RV		
