= 2010–11 Kentucky Wildcats men's basketball team =

2010–11 season of University of Kentucky men's basketball team

2010–11 Kentucky Wildcats men's basketball

SEC tournament champions

NCAA tournament, Final Four
- Conference: Southeastern Conference
- Eastern

Ranking
- Coaches: No. 3
- AP: No. 11
- Record: 29–9 (10–6 SEC)
- Head coach: John Calipari (2nd season)
- Assistant coaches: John Robic (2nd season); Orlando Antigua (2nd season); Kenny Payne (1st season)
- Home arena: Rupp Arena

2010–11 Southeastern Conference men's basketball standings
	Conf.				Overall
Team	W		L	PCT	W		L	PCT
East
No. 15 Florida	13	–	3	.813	29	–	8	.784
No. 11 Kentucky †	10	–	6	.625	29	–	9	.763
No. 25 Vanderbilt	9	–	7	.563	23	–	11	.676
Georgia	9	–	7	.563	21	–	12	.636
Tennessee	8	–	8	.500	19	–	15	.559
South Carolina	5	–	11	.313	14	–	16	.467
West
Alabama	12	–	4	.750	25	–	12	.676
Mississippi State	9	–	7	.563	17	–	14	.548
Ole Miss	7	–	9	.438	20	–	14	.588
Arkansas	7	–	9	.438	18	–	13	.581
Auburn	4	–	12	.250	11	–	20	.355
LSU	3	–	13	.188	11	–	21	.344
† 2011 SEC tournament winner As of April 2, 2011; Rankings from AP Poll

The 2010–11 Kentucky Wildcats men's basketball team represented the University of Kentucky in the college basketball season of 2010–11. The team's head coach is John Calipari, who entered his second season after posting a 35–3 record in his inaugural season.

== Pre-season ==
=== Departures ===
Name	Number	Pos.	Height	Weight	Year	Hometown	Notes
Eric Bledsoe	24	G	6' 1"	190	Freshman	Birmingham, Alabama	Entered the 2010 NBA draft
DeMarcus Cousins	15	F/C	6' 11"	270	Freshman	Mobile, Alabama	Entered the 2010 NBA draft
Darnell Dodson	3	F	6' 7"	215	Sophomore	Greenbelt, Maryland	Academically ineligible
Ramon Harris	5	G/F	6' 7"	218	Senior	Anchorage, Alaska	Graduated
Mark Krebs	12	G	6' 5"	207	Senior	Newport, Kentucky	Graduated
Daniel Orton	33	F/C	6' 10"	255	Freshman	Oklahoma City, Oklahoma	Entered the 2010 NBA draft
Patrick Patterson	54	F	6' 9"	235	Junior	Huntington, West Virginia	Entered the 2010 NBA draft
Perry Stevenson	21	F	6' 9"	215	Senior	Lafayette, Louisiana	Graduated
John Wall	11	G	6' 4"	195	Freshman	Raleigh, North Carolina	Entered the 2010 NBA draft

=== Recruiting ===
==== Class of 2010 signees ====
College recruiting (2010)
Name	Hometown	School	Height	Weight	Commit date
Brandon Knight; G	Fort Lauderdale, Florida	Pine Crest School	6 ft 3 in (1.91 m)	195 lb (88 kg)	Apr 14, 2010
Brandon Knight; G	Recruit ratings: Scout: Rivals: (97)				
Terrence Jones; F	Portland, Oregon	Jefferson High School	6 ft 9 in (2.06 m)	220 lb (100 kg)	May 19, 2010
Terrence Jones; F	Recruit ratings: Scout: Rivals: (97)				
Enes Kanter; C	Istanbul, Turkey	Stoneridge Prep	6 ft 11 in (2.11 m)	261 lb (118 kg)	Mar 23, 2010
Enes Kanter; C	Recruit ratings: Scout: Rivals: (95)				
Doron Lamb; G	Laurelton, New York	Oak Hill Academy	6 ft 4 in (1.93 m)	190 lb (86 kg)	Apr 17, 2010
Doron Lamb; G	Recruit ratings: Scout: Rivals: (95)				
Eloy Vargas; F	Moca, Dominican Republic	Miami Dade CC	6 ft 11 in (2.11 m)	225 lb (102 kg)	May 15, 2010
Eloy Vargas; F	Recruit ratings: Scout: Rivals: (95)				
Stacey Poole; G	Jacksonville, Florida	Providence School	6 ft 5 in (1.96 m)	200 lb (91 kg)	Sep 24, 2009
Stacey Poole; G	Recruit ratings: Scout: Rivals: (94)				
Jarrod Polson; G	Wilmore, Kentucky	West Jessamine High School	6 ft 1 in (1.85 m)	175 lb (79 kg)	Apr 28, 2010
Jarrod Polson; G	Recruit ratings: Scout: Rivals: (72)				
Overall recruit ranking: Scout: 1 Rivals: 1
Note: In many cases, Scout, Rivals, 247Sports, On3, and ESPN may conflict in their listings of height and weight.; In these cases, the average was taken. ESPN grades are on a 100-point scale.; Sources: "Kentucky 2010 Basketball Commitments". Rivals.; "2010 Kentucky Basketball Commits". Scout.; "ESPN". ESPN.; "Scout.com Team Recruiting Rankings". Scout.; "2010 Team Ranking". Rivals.

==== Class of 2011 commitments ====
College recruiting (2011)
Name	Hometown	School	Height	Weight	Commit date
Anthony Davis; F	Chicago, Illinois	Perspectives Charter School	6 ft 10 in (2.08 m)	200 lb (91 kg)	Aug 13, 2010
Anthony Davis; F	Recruit ratings: Scout: Rivals: (98)				
Michael Gilchrist; F	Elizabeth, New Jersey	St. Patrick	6 ft 7 in (2.01 m)	190 lb (86 kg)	Apr 14, 2010
Michael Gilchrist; F	Recruit ratings: Scout: Rivals: (98)				
Marquis Teague; G	Indianapolis, Indiana	Pike	6 ft 2 in (1.88 m)	170 lb (77 kg)	Apr 22, 2010
Marquis Teague; G	Recruit ratings: Scout: Rivals: (98)				
Kyle Wiltjer; F	Portland, Oregon	Jesuit	6 ft 9 in (2.06 m)	225 lb (102 kg)	Aug 28, 2010
Kyle Wiltjer; F	Recruit ratings: Scout: Rivals: (97)				
Overall recruit ranking: Scout: 1 Rivals: 1
Note: In many cases, Scout, Rivals, 247Sports, On3, and ESPN may conflict in their listings of height and weight.; In these cases, the average was taken. ESPN grades are on a 100-point scale.; Sources: "Kentucky 2011 Basketball Commitments". Rivals.; "2011 Kentucky Basketball Commits". Scout.; "ESPN". ESPN.; "Scout.com Team Recruiting Rankings". Scout.; "2011 Team Ranking". Rivals.

== Roster ==
2010–11 Kentucky Wildcats men's basketball team
Players
Coaches

Pos.	#	Name	Height	Weight	Year	Previous school	Hometown
C	0	Enes Kanter (I)	6 ft 11 in (2.11 m)	272 lb (123 kg)	Fr	Stoneridge Prep (CA)	Istanbul, Turkey
F	1	Darius Miller	6 ft 7 in (2.01 m)	230 lb (104 kg)	Jr	Mason County	Maysville, Kentucky
G	2	Stacey Poole	6 ft 4 in (1.93 m)	203 lb (92 kg)	Fr	Providence School	Jacksonville, Florida
F	3	Terrence Jones	6 ft 8 in (2.03 m)	250 lb (113 kg)	Fr	Jefferson	Portland, Oregon
G	4	Jon Hood	6 ft 7 in (2.01 m)	205 lb (93 kg)	So	Madisonville North Hopkins	Madisonville, Kentucky
G	5	Jarrod Polson	6 ft 2 in (1.88 m)	180 lb (82 kg)	Fr	West Jessamine	Wilmore, Kentucky
G	12	Brandon Knight (C)	6 ft 3 in (1.91 m)	195 lb (88 kg)	Fr	Pine Crest School	Fort Lauderdale, Florida
G	20	Doron Lamb	6 ft 4 in (1.93 m)	210 lb (95 kg)	Fr	Oak Hill Academy (VA)	Queens, New York
F	30	Eloy Vargas	6 ft 11 in (2.11 m)	239 lb (108 kg)	Jr	Miami Dade College	Moca, Dominican Republic
G	34	DeAndre Liggins	6 ft 6 in (1.98 m)	215 lb (98 kg)	Jr	Findlay Prep	Chicago, Illinois
F	55	Josh Harrellson	6 ft 10 in (2.08 m)	275 lb (125 kg)	Sr	Southwestern Illinois	St. Charles, Missouri
G	10	Twany Beckham (redshirt)	6 ft 5 in (1.96 m)	195 lb (88 kg)	So	Ballard	Louisville, Kentucky

Head coach

- John Calipari (Clarion)

Assistant coach(es)

- John Robic (Denison)
- Orlando Antigua (Pittsburgh)
- Kenny Payne (Louisville)

Legend

- (C) Team captain
- (S) Suspended
- (I) Ineligible
- (W) Walk-on
- Injured
- Current redshirt

- Twany Beckham transferred from Mississippi State in January 2011. He was not eligible to play until December 2011. He was still able to practice and be a part of the roster, but was not on scholarship during spring 2011.

=== Depth chart ===
Pos.	Starting 5	Bench 1	Bench 2
C	Josh Harrellson	Eloy Vargas
PF	Terrence Jones
SF	Darius Miller	Jon Hood	Stacey Poole
SG	DeAndre Liggins	Doron Lamb
PG	Brandon Knight		Jarrod Polson

== Schedule and results ==
Date time, TV	Rank^{#}	Opponent^{#}	Result	Record	High points	High rebounds	High assists	Site (attendance) city, state
Exhibition
August 15, 2010*; 7 p.m., BBSN		Windsor	W 95–62	–	31 – Knight	12 – Miller	4 – Liggins	St. Denis Centre (–); Windsor, Ontario
August 16, 2010*; 6 p.m., BBSN		Western Ontario	W 96–68	–	24 – Lamb	8 – Harrellson	12 – Knight	St. Denis Centre (–); Windsor, Ontario
August 17, 2010*; 11 a.m., BBSN		Windsor	W 104–75	–	27 – Knight	19 – Harrellson	9 – Knight	St. Denis Centre (–); Windsor, Ontario
November 1, 2010*; 7:00 pm, BBSN	No. 11	Pikeville	W 97–66	–	22 – Knight	10 – Miller	3 – (2 tied)	Rupp Arena (21,127); Lexington, KY
November 5, 2010*; 7:00 pm, BBSN	No. 11	Dillard	W 122–54	–	23 – Jones	10 – Jones	6 – Knight	Rupp Arena (21,589); Lexington, KY
Non-conference regular season
November 12, 2010*; 7:00 pm, BBSN	No. 11	East Tennessee State	W 88–65	1–0	25 – Jones	12 – Jones	5 – Knight	Rupp Arena (23,740); Lexington, KY
November 19, 2010*; 10:30 pm, ESPNU	No. 12	vs. Portland	W 79–48	2–0	21 – Knight	12 – Harrellson	4 – Miller	Rose Garden (10,216); Portland, OR
November 22, 2010*; 5:30 pm, ESPN2	No. 8	vs. Oklahoma; Maui Invitational	W 76–64	3–0	29 – Jones	13 – Jones	4 – Liggins	Lahaina Civic Center (2,400); Lahaina, HI
November 23, 2010*; 9:30 pm, ESPN	No. 8	vs. No. 13 Washington; Maui Invitational	W 74–67	4–0	24 – Knight	17 – Jones	2 – Liggins	Lahaina Civic Center (2,400); Lahaina, HI
November 24, 2010*; 10:00 pm, ESPN	No. 8	vs. Connecticut; Maui Invitational	L 67–84	4–1	24 – Jones	6 – Vargas	5 – Knight	Lahaina Civic Center (2,400); Lahaina, HI
November 30, 2010*; 7:00 pm, BBSN	No. 10	Boston University	W 91–57	5–1	23 – Knight	12 – Harrellson	6 – Knight	Rupp Arena (21,684); Lexington, KY
December 4, 2010*; 12:30 pm, CBS	No. 10	at North Carolina	L 73–75	5–2	24 – Lamb	11 – Harrellson	4 – (2 tied)	Dean Smith Center (20,695); Chapel Hill, NC
December 8, 2010*; 9:30 pm, ESPN	No. 17	vs. No. 23 Notre Dame; SEC/Big East Invitational	W 72–58	6–2	27 – Jones	19 – Jones	5 – Knight	Freedom Hall (17,404); Louisville, KY
December 11, 2010*; 5:15 pm, ESPN	No. 17	Indiana	W 81–62	7–2	19 – Liggins	12 – Harrellson	4 – Knight	Rupp Arena (24,337); Lexington, KY
December 18, 2010*; 8:00 pm, BBSN	No. 17	Mississippi Valley State	W 85–60	8–2	19 – Jones	12 – Harrellson	5 – Miller	Rupp Arena (23,341); Lexington, KY
December 22, 2010*; 1:00 pm, BBSN	No. 13	Winthrop	W 89–52	9–2	32 – Lamb	10 – Harrellson	9 – Liggins	Rupp Arena (22,698); Lexington, KY
December 28, 2010*; 7:00 pm, BBSN	No. 11	Coppin State	W 91–61	10–2	18 – Jones	8 – Liggins	8 – Knight	Rupp Arena (24,329); Lexington, KY
December 31, 2010*; 12:00 pm, CBS	No. 11	at No. 22 Louisville; Battle for the Bluegrass	W 78–63	11–2	25 – Knight	14 – Harrellson	6 – Jones	KFC Yum! Center (22,803); Louisville, KY
January 3, 2011*; 7:00 pm, ESPNU	No. 10	Penn	W 86–62	12–2	22 – Knight	12 – Harrellson	6 – Miller	Rupp Arena (21,681); Lexington, KY
SEC regular season
January 8, 2011; 4:00 pm, SECNetwork	No. 10	at Georgia	L 70–77	12–3 (0–1)	24 – Jones	11 – Harrellson	3 – (2 tied)	Stegeman Coliseum (10,523); Athens, GA
January 11, 2011; 7:00 pm, ESPNU	No. 13	Auburn	W 78–54	13–3 (1–1)	35 – Jones	8 – Jones	7 – Lamb	Rupp Arena (23,065); Lexington, KY
January 15, 2011; 4:00 pm, SEC Network	No. 13	LSU	W 82–44	14–3 (2–1)	19 – Knight	14 – Harrellson	5 – Lamb	Rupp Arena (24,330); Lexington, KY
January 18, 2011; 9:00 pm, ESPN	No. 12	at Alabama; Super Tuesday	L 66–68	14–4 (2–2)	17 – Jones	9 – (2 tied)	3 – Knight	Coleman Coliseum (14,589); Tuscaloosa, AL
January 22, 2011; 6:00 pm, ESPN	No. 12	at South Carolina	W 67–58	15–4 (3–2)	23 – Knight	7 – (3 tied)	3 – Liggins	Colonial Life Arena (18,000); Columbia, SC
January 29, 2011; 4:00 pm, ESPN	No. 14	Georgia	W 66–60	16–4 (4–2)	19 – Lamb	8 – Harrellson	4 – Knight	Rupp Arena (24,352); Lexington, KY
February 1, 2011; 7:00 pm, ESPNU/ESPN2	No. 10	at Ole Miss	L 69–71	16–5 (4–3)	22 – Jones	6 – Jones	2 – Knight	Tad Smith Coliseum (8,243); Oxford, MS
February 5, 2011; 9:00 pm, ESPN	No. 10	at Florida; College GameDay	L 68–70	16–6 (4–4)	24 – Knight	7 – Jones	4 – Knight	O'Connell Center (12,633); Gainesville, FL
February 8, 2011; 9:00 pm, ESPN	No. 18	Tennessee; Super Tuesday	W 73–61	17–6 (5–4)	19 – Liggins	11 – Jones	3 – Liggins	Rupp Arena (24,334); Lexington, KY
February 12, 2011; 1:00 pm, CBS	No. 18	at No. 23 Vanderbilt	L 77–81	17–7 (5–5)	25 – Jones	10 – Harrellson	3 – Harrellson	Memorial Gymnasium (14,316); Nashville, TN
February 15, 2011; 7:00 pm, ESPN	No. 22	Mississippi State; Super Tuesday	W 85–79	18–7 (6–5)	24 – Knight	10 – Jones	7 – Knight	Rupp Arena (23,196); Lexington, KY
February 19, 2011; 4:00 pm, SEC Network	No. 22	South Carolina	W 90–59	19–7 (7–5)	22 – Miller	12 – Jones	9 – Knight	Rupp Arena (24,338); Lexington, KY
February 23, 2011; 8:00 pm, SEC Network	No. 22	at Arkansas	L 76–77 ^{OT}	19–8 (7–6)	26 – Knight	14 – Harrellson	5 – Knight	Bud Walton Arena (13,472); Fayetteville, AR
February 26, 2011; 4:00 pm, CBS	No. 22	No. 13 Florida	W 76–68	20–8 (8–6)	24 – Miller	12 – Harrellson	6 – Knight	Rupp Arena (24,346); Lexington, KY
March 1, 2011; 9:00 pm, ESPN	No. 20	No. 21 Vanderbilt; Super Tuesday	W 68–66	21–8 (9–6)	17 – Knight	9 – (2 tied)	3 – Knight	Rupp Arena (24,275); Lexington, KY
March 6, 2011; 12:00 pm, CBS	No. 20	at Tennessee	W 64–58	22–8 (10–6)	19 – Knight	11 – Jones	3 – (2 tied)	Thompson-Boling Arena (21,678); Knoxville, TN
SEC Tournament
March 11, 2011; 3:30 pm, SEC Network	(E2) No. 15	vs. (W3) Ole Miss; SEC Quarterfinals	W 75–66	23–8	19 – Lamb	7 – (3 tied)	6 – Knight	Georgia Dome (21,875); Atlanta, GA
March 12, 2011; 1:00 pm, ABC	(E2) No. 15	vs. (W1) Alabama; SEC Semifinals	W 72–58	24–8	15 – Lamb	10 – Harrellson	7 – Knight	Georgia Dome (21,728); Atlanta, GA
March 13, 2011; 1:00 pm, ABC	(E2) No. 15	vs. (E1) No. 12 Florida; SEC Championship Game	W 70–54	25–8	17 – Knight	8 – Harrellson	4 – Knight	Georgia Dome (21,409); Atlanta, GA
NCAA tournament
March 17, 2011*; 3:08 pm, CBS	(4 E) No. 11	vs. (13 E) Princeton; NCAA Second Round	W 59–57	26–8	17 – Miller	10 – Harrellson	5 – Knight	St. Pete Times Forum (14,835); Tampa, FL
March 19, 2011*; 12:15 pm, CBS	(4 E) No. 11	vs. (5 E) No. 22 West Virginia; NCAA Third Round	W 71–63	27–8	30 – Knight	10 – Jones	4 – (2 tied)	St. Pete Times Forum (17,771); Tampa, FL
March 25, 2011*; 9:54 pm, CBS	(4 E) No. 11	vs. (1 E) No. 1 Ohio State; NCAA Sweet Sixteen	W 62–60	28–8	17 – Harrellson	10 – Harrellson	4 – (2 tied)	Prudential Center (18,343); Newark, NJ
March 27, 2011*; 4:55 pm, CBS	(4 E) No. 11	vs. (2 E) No. 7 North Carolina; NCAA Elite Eight	W 76–69	29–8	22 – Knight	8 – Harrellson	4 – (2 tied)	Prudential Center (18,278); Newark, NJ
April 2, 2011*; 8:49 pm, CBS	(4 E) No. 11	vs. (3 W) No. 9 Connecticut; NCAA Final Four	L 55–56	29–9	17 – B. Knight	15 – T. Jones	5 – B. Knight	Reliant Stadium (75,421); Houston, TX
*Non-conference game. ^{#}Rankings from AP Poll. (#) Tournament seedings in parentheses. E=NCAA East Regional. W=NCAA West Regional. All times are in Eastern Time.

== Rankings ==
Ranking movements Legend: ██ Increase in ranking ██ Decrease in ranking
	Week																			
Poll	Pre	1	2	3	4	5	6	7	8	9	10	11	12	13	14	15	16	17	18	Final
AP	11	12	8	10	17	17	13	11	10	13	12	14	10	18	22	22	20	15	11	
Coaches	10	13	9	11	16	16	14	12	11	15	12	16	11	18	22	22	23	16	10	3
