= Bill Keightley =

American basketball equipment manager for the University of Kentucky

- Born: William Bond Keightley; December 17, 1926; Lawrenceburg, Kentucky
- Died: March 31, 2008 (aged 81); Cincinnati, Ohio
- Other names: "Mr. Wildcat"
- Occupations: Equipment manager for University of Kentucky men's basketball, 1972–2008

William Bond Keightley (December 17, 1926 – March 31, 2008) was the equipment manager for the University of Kentucky men's basketball team, a position he held for 48 years. Known affectionately to most as "Mr. Wildcat," players referred to him as "Mr. Bill" or "Big Smooth."

== Early life and career ==
Keightley was an All-State center for now-defunct Kavanaugh High School in Lawrenceburg, Kentucky. He graduated in 1944. He enlisted with the United States Marine Corps, and served in World War II.

Keightley was working as a postal carrier in 1962 when fellow postal employee George Hukle asked him to become his assistant at his other job—equipment manager for the University of Kentucky basketball team. Keightley accepted the position; ten years later, he succeeded Hukle as equipment manager. He held the post during the tenures of coaches Adolph Rupp, Joe B. Hall, Eddie Sutton, Rick Pitino, Tubby Smith, and Billy Gillispie.

== Honors and awards ==
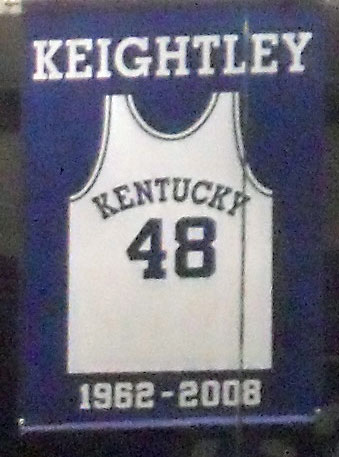
A jersey honoring Keightley hangs in Rupp Arena

- Keightley was on three NCAA Championship teams (1978, 1996, 1998) with the Wildcats. He wore one championship ring on each hand and kept the third ring in his pocket.
- In 1997, the university retired a jersey in honor of Keightley. He and broadcaster Cawood Ledford are the only two people who did not play for or coach the Wildcats that have received such an honor. For the 2009 season, the jersey was given the number #48 to reflect his 48 years of service (previously it simply read "UK" for the number)
- In 2001, Keightley was featured on special edition bottles of Maker's Mark bourbon.
- In 2002, the university presented the first Bill Keightley Award. The award is given to "the individual who understands and exemplifies the pride, respect and the positive attributes associated with being a part of the Kentucky basketball program."
- In 2005, he was honored with the Lifetime Achievement Award at the university's annual "Catspy" awards.
- On May 2, 2007, Keightley was inducted into the Kentucky Athletic Hall of Fame.
- On October 11, 2008, during Midnight Madness, Keightley was honored at the home bench of the Wildcats where his seat was. His daughter Karen and his fellow equipment manager assistants pulled off a piece of the basketball court as a memorial to remember him by. During that season, the "K" (in KENTUCKY) on the front of the player's jerseys was done in black as a tribute.
- Several oral history interviews with Keightley were conducted by the Louie B. Nunn Center for Oral History at the University of Kentucky Libraries between 2005 and 2007 and can be accessed online: William B. Keightley Oral History Project
- In the 2013–14 season, Kentucky's men's basketball team scheduled a series of home games called the Keightley Classic in Keightley's honor.

== Family ==
Keightley was married to Hazel (Robinson) Keightley. The couple had one daughter, Karen, who formerly worked at the university's veterinary science center, and is now employed with the athletic department. Keightley was an avid fan of the Cincinnati Reds.

== Death ==
Keightley died on March 31, 2008, after suffering a fall from a bus on his way to the season opening Cincinnati Reds baseball game versus the Arizona Diamondbacks. The cause of death was internal bleeding caused by a previously undiagnosed tumor on his spine. His memorial service was attended by many prominent basketball coaches, including Billy Gillispie, Rick Pitino, Billy Donovan, Rick Stansbury, and John Pelphrey (also a former Kentucky player). Many other former Kentucky basketball players attended as well, including former Louisville Cardinal player Ellis Myles. The Wildcats did not hire a new equipment manager for the 2009 season and in fact left his chair on the bench empty for the season. As an additional tribute, the first "K" in "KENTUCKY" on the players jerseys for the 2009 season was black outlined.
