= James Young (basketball) =

American basketball player (born 1995)

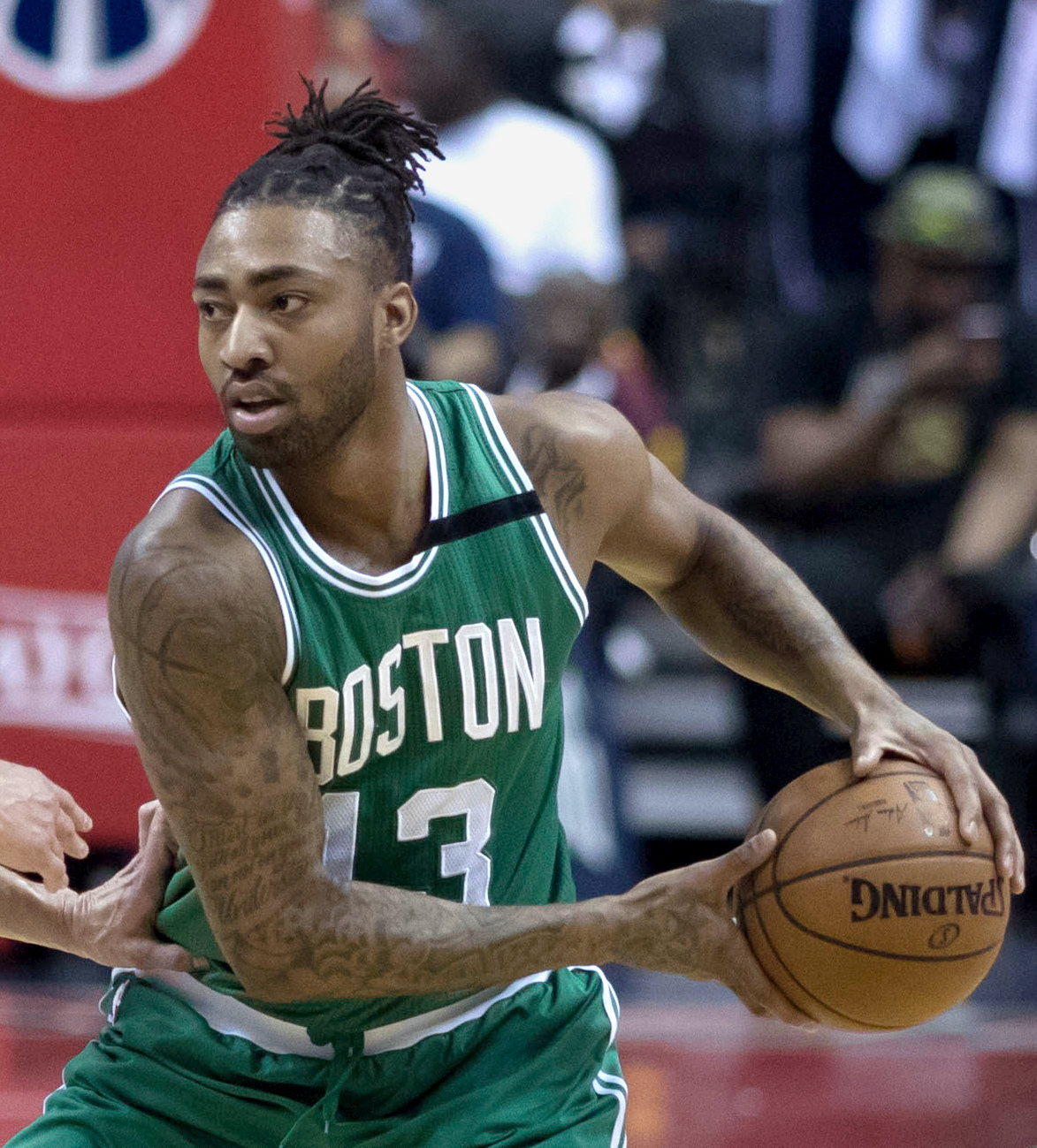
- Young with the Boston Celtics in 2017

Free agent
- Position: Shooting guard

Personal information
- Born: August 16, 1995 (age 31) Flint, Michigan, U.S.
- Listed height: 6 ft 6 in (1.98 m)
- Listed weight: 216 lb (98 kg)

Career information
- High school: Troy (Troy, Michigan); Rochester (Rochester Hills, Michigan)
- College: Kentucky (2013–2014)
- NBA draft: 2014: 1st round, 17th overall pick
- Drafted by: Boston Celtics
- Playing career: 2014–present

Career history
- 2014–2017: Boston Celtics
- 2014–2016: →Maine Red Claws
- 2017–2018: Wisconsin Herd
- 2018: Philadelphia 76ers
- 2018: →Delaware 87ers
- 2018–2019: Wisconsin Herd
- 2019–2020: Maccabi Haifa
- 2021: Westchester Knicks
- 2021–2022: Hapoel Tel Aviv
- 2023: Kolossos Rodou
- 2023: Treviso Basket
- 2023–2024: Varese
- 2025: Ipswich Force

Career highlights
- Israeli Basketball Premier League Top Scorer (2020); Second-team All-SEC (2014); SEC All-Freshman Team (2014); McDonald's All-American (2013); First-team Parade All-American (2013)
- Stats at NBA.com
- Stats at Basketball Reference

James Calvin Young (born August 16, 1995) is an American professional basketball player who last played for the Ipswich Force of the NBL1 North. He played one season of college basketball for the Kentucky Wildcats before being selected with the 17th overall pick in the 2014 NBA draft by the Boston Celtics. He spent the majority of his rookie NBA season playing in the NBA Development League for the Celtics' affiliate team, the Maine Red Claws. In 2019–20 he was the top scorer in the Israel Basketball Premier League, with an average of 20.5 points per game.

== High school career ==
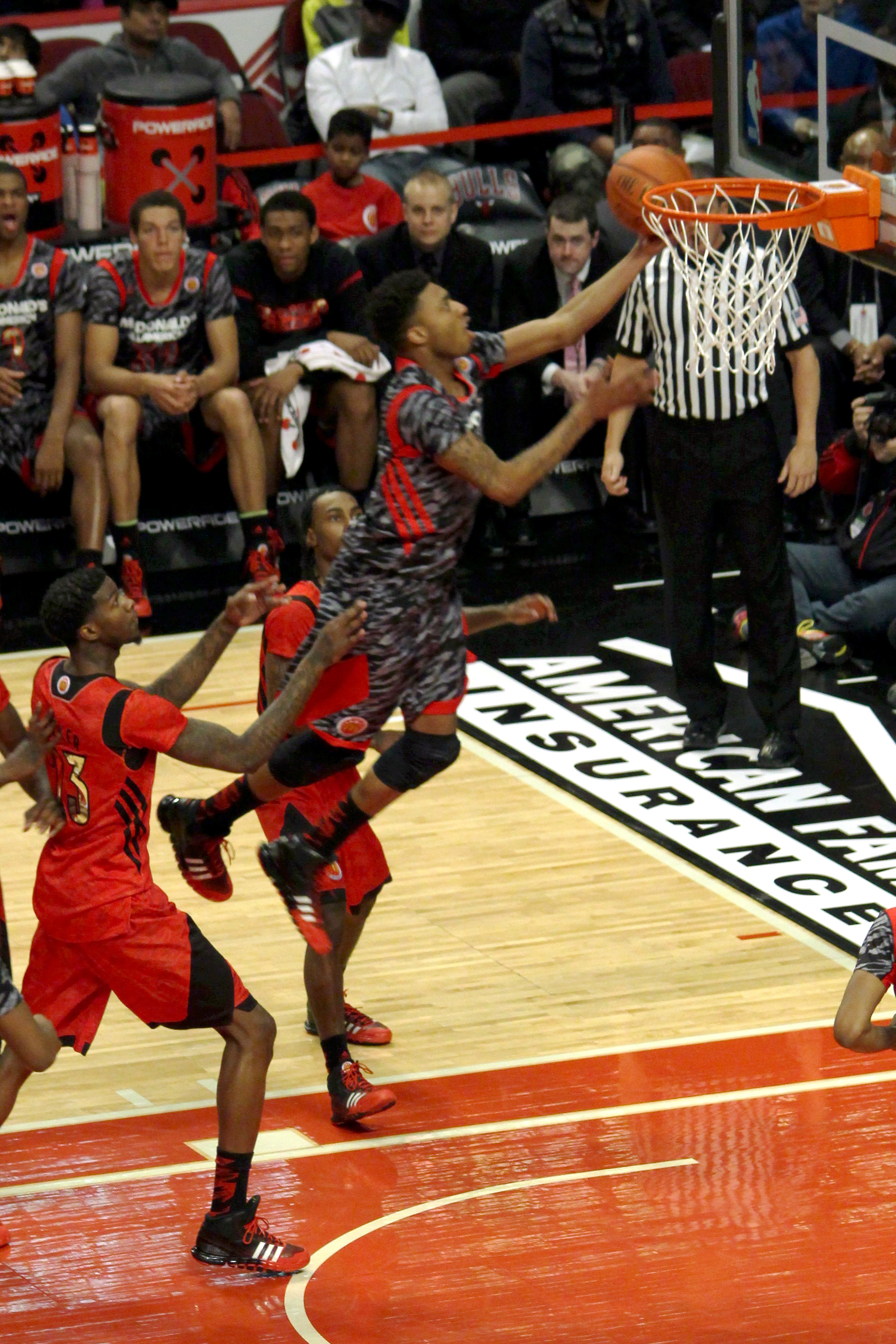
Young slashes for a layup in the 2013 McDonald's All-American Boys Game

Young attended both Troy High School in Troy, Michigan, and Rochester High School in Rochester Hills, Michigan. As a junior at Troy in 2011–12, Young averaged 25.1 points, 10.5 rebounds, 4.5 assists and 2.5 steals per game, earning first-team All-State honors from the Associated Press, Detroit News and Detroit Free Press.

On October 11, 2012, Young signed a letter of intent to play college basketball for the University of Kentucky. As a senior at Rochester in 2012–13, Young averaged 27.2 points, 16.0 rebounds and 5.7 assists per game, going on to earn McDonald's All-American honors losing twice to Rochester Adams High School.

Considered a five-star recruit by ESPN.com, Young was listed as the No. 3 small forward and the No. 8 player in the nation in 2013.

== College career ==
As a freshman at Kentucky in 2013–14, Young finished second in UK single-season freshman history with 82 made three-pointers on the season. He was named SEC Freshman of the Week two times, earned second-team All-SEC honors, SEC All-Freshman team honors, and was named to the Final Four NCAA All-Tournament team. In 40 games (39 starts), he averaged 14.3 points, 4.3 rebounds and 1.7 assists in 32.4 minutes per game. Early in the season, on November 19, he scored a career-high 26 points and hit five three-pointers in a 105–76 win over UT Arlington.

On April 17, 2014, Young declared for the NBA draft, forgoing his final three years of college eligibility.

== Professional career ==
=== Boston Celtics (2014–2017) ===
==== 2014–15 season ====
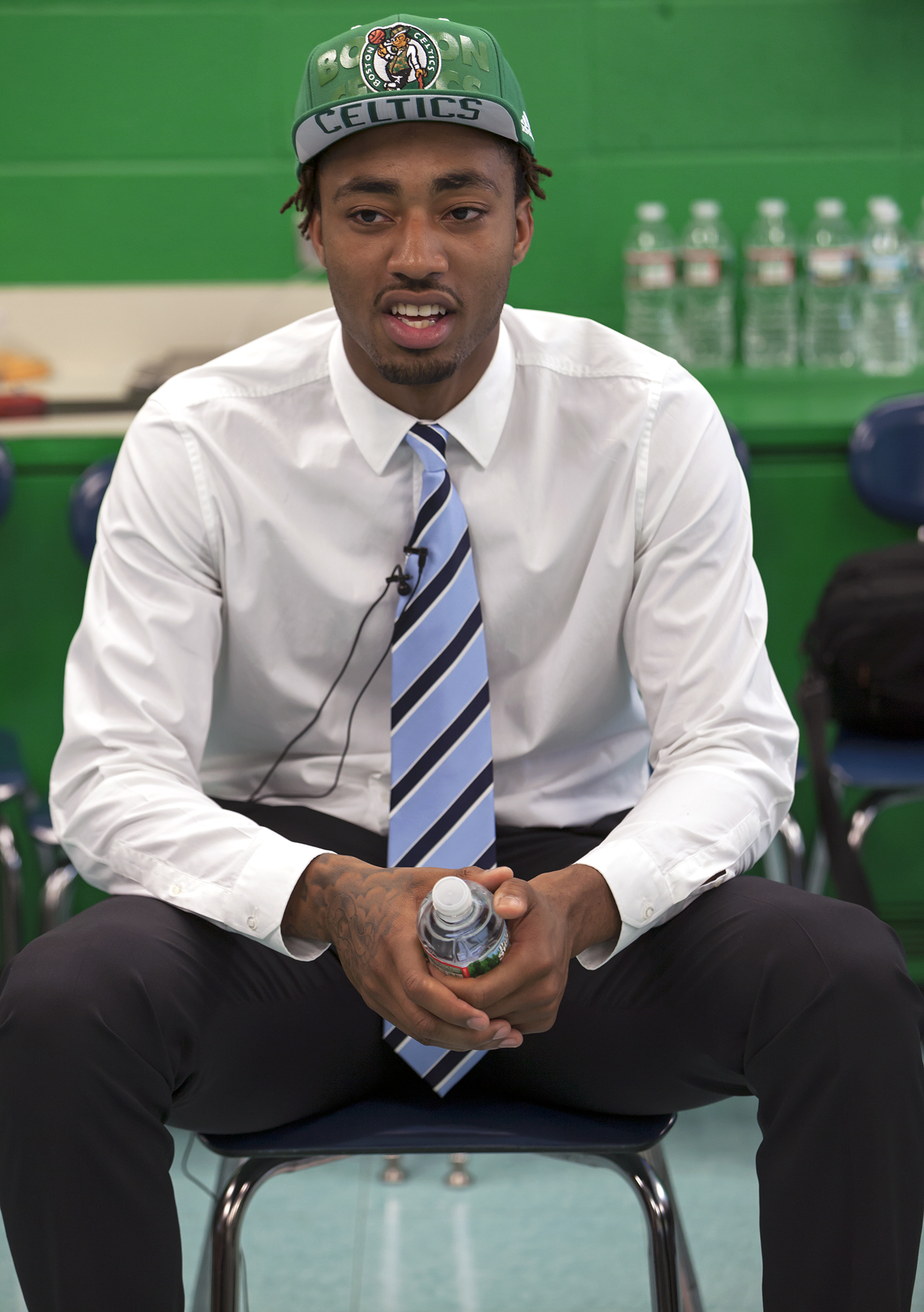
Young with the Celtics in 2014

On June 26, 2014, Young was selected with the 17th overall pick in the 2014 NBA draft by the Boston Celtics. On July 10, 2014, he signed his rookie scale contract with the Celtics. Injuries forced Young to miss the summer league, most of training camp and part of the early season. Because of these setbacks, Young spent much of the season driving back and forth between Boston and Maine, playing for the Red Claws in order to receive consistent playing time. He had 11 D-League assignments in total during his rookie season. Playing in the D-League was something Young was originally against, but grew to love in time, even urging the Celtics to send him to Maine during the month of December. Young finally got an opportunity to shine for the Celtics on January 5, 2015, scoring a season-high 13 points in a loss to the Charlotte Hornets. In light of this performance, Young had a solid run of playing time in Brad Stevens' rotation, averaging 3.8 points in 12.9 minutes per game between January 5 and March 6. However, following that string of opportunities, Young managed just four more appearances to close out the regular season, and failed to appear in any of the Celtics' four playoff games against the Cleveland Cavaliers.

In 19 games for the Red Claws in 2014–15, Young averaged 20.7 points, 5.2 rebounds, 2.0 assists and 1.4 steals per game.

==== 2015–16 season ====
In July 2015, Young joined the Celtics for the 2015 NBA Summer League, where he averaged 9.4 points and 3.4 rebounds in five games. His performance was considered underwhelming, as he shot just 27.1% from the field and 22.7% from three-point range. He subsequently played the fewest preseason minutes of anyone who made the final 2015–16 opening night roster. Despite this, on October 30, the Celtics exercised their third-year team option on Young's rookie scale contract, extending the contract through the 2016–17 season. His early 2015–16 season opportunities mirrored his rookie season, as he spent five days with the Red Claws between November 3 and 9 on two different assignments before finally making his season debut for the Celtics on November 10, playing in the final 49 seconds of the team's 99–83 win over the Milwaukee Bucks. He received three more assignments to Maine following this. After playing in three games for the Celtics between November 24 and December 3, he almost got on a plane from San Antonio to Maine on December 4, but was informed not to minutes before boarding; the Celtics needed Young as insurance because of a quad injury to Avery Bradley. Young ultimately did not play for the Celtics against the Spurs on December 5. He went on to appear in seven of the team's next eight games, averaging 14.3 minutes per game over that stretch. Young received seven more assignments to the Red Claws in 2016 and appeared in three of the Celtics' six playoff games against the Atlanta Hawks.

In 16 games for the Red Claws in 2015–16, Young averaged 14.8 points, 5.6 rebounds, 1.9 assists and 1.0 steals per game.

==== 2016–17 season ====
In July 2016, Young re-joined the Celtics for the 2016 NBA Summer League, where he averaged 7.5 points and 2.8 rebounds in six games. On October 24, 2016, Young was retained by the Celtics for the 2016–17 season. On November 12, 2016, in the Celtics' ninth game of the season, Young scored a season-high 12 points in a 105–99 win over the Indiana Pacers. Young went unassigned in 2016–17 but only managed 29 games during the regular season.

=== 2017 off-season ===
In July 2017, Young became a free agent and joined the New Orleans Pelicans for the 2017 NBA Summer League. On September 6, 2017, he signed a training camp contract with the Milwaukee Bucks. He was waived by the Bucks on October 5, 2017.

=== Wisconsin Herd (2017–2018) ===
On October 22, 2017, Young was named in the inaugural Wisconsin Herd training camp roster. He went on to earn a spot in the team's opening-night roster.

=== Philadelphia 76ers (2018) ===
On January 5, 2018, Young was signed to a two-way contract by the Philadelphia 76ers. Under the terms of the deal, Young split his playing time for the year between the 76ers and their G League affiliate, the Delaware 87ers. On March 26, 2018, Young was waived by the 76ers.

=== Second stint with Wisconsin Herd (2018–2019) ===
In October 2018, Young re-joined the Wisconsin Herd. On January 18, 2019, he was waived by the Herd.

=== Maccabi Haifa (2019–2020) ===
On August 8, 2019, Young signed a one-year deal with Maccabi Haifa of the Israeli Premier League. On November 14, 2019, Young recorded a career-high 32 points, shooting 9-of-17 from the field, along with five rebounds and three assists, leading Haifa to a 95–83 win over Hapoel Gilboa Galil. On December 22, 2019, Young tied his career-high 32 points, while shooting 7-of-11 from three-point range, along with eight rebounds and three steals in a 92–60 blowout win over Hapoel Holon. He averaged 20.3 points, 5.2 rebounds, 1.9 assists, and 1.4 steals per game for the team. In 2019–20 he was the top scorer in the Israel Basketball Premier League, with an average of 20.5 points per game.

=== Westchester Knicks (2020–2021) ===
On December 14, 2020, Young was signed by the New York Knicks. He was waived before the start of the season and assigned to the Knicks' G League affiliate, the Westchester Knicks.

=== Hapoel Tel Aviv (2021–2022) ===
On March 8, 2021, he signed with Hapoel Tel Aviv of the Israeli Basketball Premier League.

=== Kolossos Rodou (2023) ===
On January 12, 2023, Young signed with Greek club Kolossos Rodou for the rest of the season. In 10 league games, he averaged 9.1 points and 3.3 rebounds, playing around 16 minutes per contest.

=== Universo Treviso Basket (2023–2024) ===
On July 22, 2023, he signed with Treviso Basket of the Lega Basket Serie A.

=== Ipswich Force (2025) ===
On April 14, 2025, Young was announced on the roster of the Ipswich Force for the 2025 NBL1 North season.

== Career statistics ==
Legend
GP	Games played	GS	Games started	MPG	Minutes per game
FG%	Field goal percentage	3P%	3-point field goal percentage	FT%	Free throw percentage
RPG	Rebounds per game	APG	Assists per game	SPG	Steals per game
BPG	Blocks per game	PPG	Points per game	**Bold**	Career high

=== NBA ===
==== Regular season ====
Year	Team	GP	GS	MPG	FG%	3P%	FT%	RPG	APG	SPG	BPG	PPG
2014–15	Boston	**31**	0	**10.7**	.353	.258	.552	**1.4**	**.4**	**.3**	**.1**	**3.4**
2015–16	Boston	29	0	6.9	.306	.231	.250	.9	.3	.2	.0	1.0
2016–17	Boston	29	0	7.6	**.431**	**.343**	**.667**	.9	.1	**.3**	**.1**	2.3
2017–18	Philadelphia	6	0	10.2	.357	.300	**.667**	.3	.3	.0	.0	2.8
Career		95	0	8.5	.367	.277	.563	1.0	.3	.3	.1	2.3

==== Playoffs ====
Year	Team	GP	GS	MPG	FG%	3P%	FT%	RPG	APG	SPG	BPG	PPG
2016	Boston	3	0	3.5	**.333**	.000	—	.0	.0	.0	.0	.7
2017	Boston	**10**	0	**3.9**	**.333**	**.357**	—	**.7**	**.3**	.0	.0	**1.5**
Career		13	0	3.8	.333	.333	—	.5	.2	.0	.0	1.3

=== College ===
Year	Team	GP	GS	MPG	FG%	3P%	FT%	RPG	APG	SPG	BPG	PPG
2013–14	Kentucky	40	39	32.4	.407	.349	.706	4.3	1.7	.8	.2	14.3
