= Jarrod Polson =

American basketball player (born 1991)

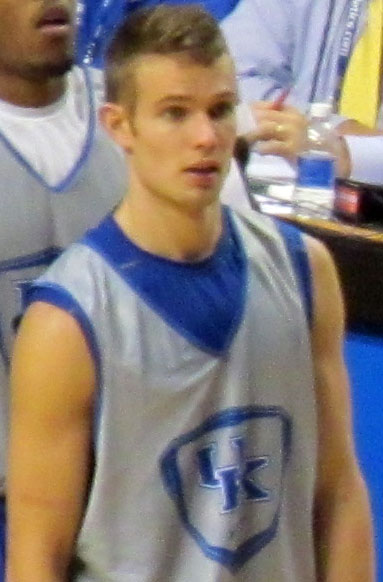
- Polson during Kentucky's 2013 Blue-White scrimmage

Personal information
- Born: May 8, 1991 (age 35) Nicholasville, Kentucky, U.S.
- Listed height: 6 ft 2 in (1.88 m)
- Listed weight: 189 lb (86 kg)

Career information
- High school: West Jessamine (Nicholasville, Kentucky)
- College: Kentucky (2010–2014)
- NBA draft: 2014: undrafted
- Position: Guard

Career highlights
- NCAA champion (2012)

Jarrod Polson (born May 8, 1991) is a former college basketball player for the University of Kentucky Wildcats men's basketball team. He is a 6-foot-2, 189-pound guard. Playing for West Jessamine High School in January 2009, Polson set the KHSAA Kentucky state high school basketball record for free throws attempted and free throws made, in a game in which he also scored 51 points.

In April 2012, Polson was a member of the 2012 NCAA Men's Division I Basketball Tournament championship team, and was recognized along with the other members of the team by a resolution of the Kentucky House of Representatives. As of the 2020–21 season, Polson remained one of only five players to play four scholarship seasons under John Calipari at Kentucky.

== High school career ==
Jarrod Polson played all four of his high school years at West Jessamine High School. In his freshman season, Polson and the West Jessamine Colts finished with a record of 20–10. During that season, they won the 46th District championship but lost in the second round of the 12th Region championship tournament.

In his sophomore season, Polson and the Colts finished the season with a record of 22–11. During that season, they won the 46th District championship (for the second straight season) but lost in the third round of the 12th Region championship tournament.

In his junior season, Polson and the Colts finished the season with a record of 28–9. During that season, they won the 46th District championship (for the third straight season), won the 12th Region championship (first time for Polson), but lost in the third round of the National City/KHSAA Boys Sweet Sixteen® Basketball Tournament.

In his senior season, Polson and the Colts finished the season with a record of 27–8. During that season, they won the 46th District championship (for the fourth straight season), won the 12th Region championship (second straight season), but lost in the second round of the PNC/KHSAA Boys Sweet Sixteen® Basketball Tournament.

Polson finished his high school career with a total of 482 assists, 429 rebounds, and 1,884 points. Polson was first team all state in his senior season.

== College career ==
Jarrod Polson was originally a walk-on for the University of Kentucky Wildcats men's basketball team, however he quickly earned a full scholarship before his freshman year began, with Calipari calling him one of the best walk-ons he had ever had. In his freshman season, the cats finished the season with a record of 29–9. During that season, the cats won the SEC Championship, won the NCAA East Region Championship, but lost in the Final Four to Connecticut (55–56). Polson played a total of 31 minutes where he had 2 rebounds, 2 personal fouls, 3 turnovers, and 6 points.

In his sophomore season, the Cats finished the season with a record of 38–2. During that season, the cats won the Basketball Hall of Fame Tip-Off Championship, won the SEC Regular Season Championship, lost in the finals of the SEC Championship Tournament to Vanderbilt, won the NCAA South Region Championship, and won the NCAA National Championship. This is the Cats eighth time winning the National Championship. Polson played a total of 31 minutes where he had 4 rebounds, 1 assist, 2 steals, 4 personal fouls, 5 turnovers, and 1 point.

In his junior season, Polson suddenly found himself in the rotation after a break-out performance in the season opening game against the Maryland Terrapins on November 9, 2012. Coach Calipari subbed Polson in for Ryan Harrow, whose play was greatly hindered due to flu-like symptoms. Polson successfully handled the pressure and finished the game with 10 points, 2 rebounds (both offensive rebounds), 3 assists, 1 steal, and 0 turnovers. The one steal was off of a missed free throw by Nerlens Noel, which was rebounded by Terrapins guard Pe'Shon Howard. Maryland head coach Mark Turgeon later called Polson's steal and acrobatic layup the "play of the game." In the final seconds of the game, Polson extended Kentucky's lead from 1 to 3 points by sinking two free throws. Dick Vitale commented that Polson was "the MVP for Kentucky" in that game, and Turgeon said that Polson was "the key" to Kentucky's victory. Since that game, Polson has seen solid minutes off the bench for Kentucky, including a start in a losing effort against Tennessee on February 16, 2013 (Kentucky's first game without Nerlens Noel, who suffered an ACL tear the previous game against Florida).

Polson's role diminished in his senior season as Kentucky reloaded with talented freshmen. In 33 games Polson scored just 32 points and failing to score in four appearances in the NCAA Tournament, when Kentucky's surprising run to the title game was ended by Connecticut on April 7, 2014. Kentucky finished the season 29–11, and Polson got his only start on Senior Day, a 55–48 win over Alabama on March 4.

== Post college ==
Polson currently works as a market developer for a non-profit in Lexington, Kentucky.
