= John Robic =

American basketball coach

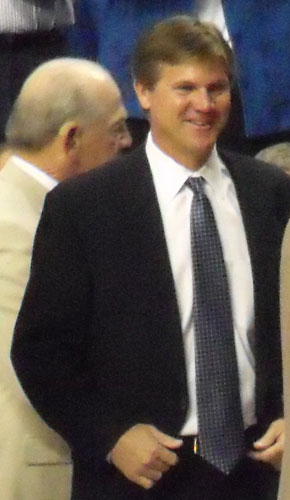
- Robic before a game at Rupp Arena

Biographical details
- Born: August 10, 1963 (age 63)

Playing career
- 1982–1984: Walsh
- 1984–1986: Denison

Coaching career (HC unless noted)
- 1986–1988: Kansas (asst.)
- 1988–1999: Massachusetts (asst.)
- 1999–2005: Youngstown State
- 2005–2009: Memphis (asst.)
- 2009–2021: Kentucky (asst.)

John Robic (/ˈroʊbɪk/ ROH-bik; born August 10, 1963) is an American men's basketball coach. He most recently served as an assistant men's basketball coach at the University of Kentucky. Prior to joining the Wildcats staff, he served as assistant coach at the University of Memphis and head coach at Youngstown State University.

== Playing career ==
After graduating from North Hills High School in Pittsburgh, Pennsylvania, Robic attended Walsh College in Canton, Ohio, before transferring to Denison University in Granville, Ohio, where he earned his Bachelor of Arts degree in speech communication and physical education in 1986. Robic's 1982-83 season at Walsh was during head coach Bob Huggins' last year at the college.

At Denison, Robic garnered Division III All-America accolades as a senior and was a two-time all-conference performer. He was one of 10 former players to be named to the 10th Anniversary All-Decade Team in the league in 1994. In the fall of 2006, he was inducted into the Denison Athletic Hall of Fame. Robic was inducted into the North Hills High School Hall of Fame in 2004.

== Coaching career ==
Robic served as a graduate assistant on Larry Brown's staff at the University of Kansas for two years (1986–87, 1987–88). While in Lawrence, he was a member of the coaching staff that led the Jayhawks to a 52-22 two-year mark and consecutive NCAA Tournaments. The 1986-87 squad advanced to the NCAA Sweet 16, and the 1987-88 team, dubbed "Danny Manning and The Miracles", won the NCAA championship behind the spectacular performance of the Jayhawk All-American.

Robic served as an assistant for 11 years at Massachusetts for both John Calipari and Bruiser Flint. After a 10-18 mark his first season on staff, Robic helped lead the Minutemen to nine consecutive winning campaigns. From 1990 to 1996, the Minutemen averaged 26 wins per year and had six-straight 20-win seasons, including two 30-victory campaigns. Mass made the NCAA Tournament Sweet 16 in 1992, Elite Eight in 1995 and Final Four in 1996. It was Mass' first appearance on college basketball's largest stage. After Calipari moved on to the NBA, Robic remained at Mass and was elevated to the associate head coach post under Flint from 1997 to 1999. During his tenure at Mass, the Minutemen posted a 247-111 overall record (.690 winning percentage) and earned nine postseason tournament bids (seven NCAA, two NIT).

Robic was hired as the head coach at Youngstown State University men's basketball team in May 1999. Prior to its move to the Horizon League in 2001, Youngstown State put together a tremendous year in the Mid-Continent Conference in 2000-01, Robic's second year at the helm. The Penguins posted a 19-11 overall mark and an 11-5 conference record. The 19 overall wins were the second most in 16 seasons, and the 11 league victories tied the school record for most conference wins. In six seasons, Robic's record was 58 wins and 113 losses for a winning percentage of 0.339.

In 2005, Robic rejoined coach John Calipari as an assistant at the University of Memphis. Robic helped lead Memphis to another storied era in his four seasons as an assistant (2006–09). During these four years, the Tigers won an NCAA record 137 games (137-14 record), while advancing to the 2006 and 2007 NCAA Elite Eights, the 2008 NCAA title game and sweeping the 2006-09 Conference USA regular season and tournament crowns. Memphis spent each week of the last four years in the national polls. In 2007-08, Robic was a part of the Tigers' "Dream Season", which lasted through the NCAA championship game. Memphis set an NCAA record for victories with 38 wins (38-2 mark) and held down the No. 1 spot in both national polls for a school-record five-straight weeks during the season.

When Calipari accepted the head coach position at the University of Kentucky in 2009, Robic went with him as an assistant coach. Robic helped the Wildcats post a 35-3 mark in his inaugural season at Kentucky. The Cats made an appearance in the 2010 Elite Eight while claiming SEC regular season and tournament championships along the way. He helped UK make history when five Wildcats were drafted in the first round of the 2010 NBA draft. Robic has been Calipari's assistant coach for a total of 21 years.

In August 2021, Robic transitioned into an administrative role in the athletic department.
