= Madisonville North Hopkins High School =

Location
- 4515 Hanson Road; Madisonville, Kentucky 42431; United States
- 37.3807°N 87.4947°W

Information
- School type: Public
- Motto: Expect More
- Founded: 1968
- School district: Hopkins County Schools
- Principal: Adam Harris
- Teaching staff: 64.50 (FTE)
- Grades: 9–12
- Enrollment: 1,076 (2023-2024)
- Student to teacher ratio: 16.68
- Campus: Small city
- Colors: Maroon , White , Black
- Team name: Maroons and Lady Maroons
- Feeder schools: James Madison Middle School, Browning Springs Middle School, Christ the King School, West Hopkins School
- Athletics: Baseball, basketball, cheerleading, cross country, football, golf, powerlifting, soccer, softball, Bass Fishing, swimming, tennis, track, volleyball
- Website: https://madisonvillenorthhopkins.hopkins.kyschools.us/

Madisonville North Hopkins High School (MNHHS) located in Madisonville, Kentucky, United States, opened in fall 1968. The school, located on Hanson Road, replaced the old Madisonville High School. Classes had graduated from the Spring Street facility from 1939 to 1968. The building now houses Browning Springs Middle School. MNHHS is one of two high schools in the Hopkins County school district, the other being Hopkins County Central High School.

== Academics ==
Madisonville North Hopkins has a curriculum of several Advanced Placement classes, including: English Language and Composition, English Literature and Composition, World History: Modern, United States History, Government and Politics: United States, Spanish Language and Culture, Spanish Literature and Culture, Calculus AB, Statistics, Biology, and Chemistry. The school day at MNHHS consists of 7 periods, with each period lasting 50 minutes. 26 credits are required to graduate.

== Activities ==
The Madisonville North Hopkins Marching Maroons regularly compete in the Kentucky State Marching Band Championships and, in addition to having 25 state finals appearances, are the 2005, 2006, 2007, 2008, 2009, 2010, 2011, 2012, 2013, and 2014 AAAA state champions.

The Madisonville North Hopkins Maroon "powerlifting" team has won the AAA state championship for 4 years, however, it is not a KHSAA sponsored sport.

The Future Problem Solving team won the international championship in 2006 and 2007. The Academic Team has won District 5 and Region 2 for the past 6 years, placed 2nd at State in 2006, and placed 3rd at state in 2007.

The Madisonville North Hopkins Maroon cheerleaders were the 2009 KAPOS Small Varsity State Champions.

The school recently added an Archery Team in 2012. The team will compete against the surrounding counties, KHSAA does not recognize this as a sponsored sport, much like the Powerlifting team.

In the present context, the school no longer encompasses a competitive bass fishing team, yet it is noteworthy that there exists a collective desire among the students for the school to feature a fishing team.

== Notable alumni ==
- Jeremy Clark, NFL cornerback for the New York Jets
- Sonny Collins, former NFL running back
- Travis Ford, former basketball player & current coach
- Bill Hagerty, U.S. Senator from Tennessee and former ambassador to Japan
- Frank Ramsey, former professional basketball player & coach
