= West Jessamine High School =

Coordinates: 37.88688°N 84.61588°W

Location
- 2101 Wilmore Road; Nicholasville, Kentucky 40356; United States

Information
- Type: Public
- Motto: The West Way
- Established: 1997
- School district: Jessamine County Schools
- Principal: Brady Thornton
- Teaching staff: 72.30 (FTE)
- Enrollment: 1,349 (2023-2024)
- Student to teacher ratio: 18.66
- Colors: Red, white and Columbia blue
- Nickname: Colts
- Website: https://www.jessamine.kyschools.us/o/wjhs

West Jessamine High School is a public high school in Nicholasville, Kentucky. It opened in 1997 along with East Jessamine High School after rapidly growing Jessamine County split its former high school, Jessamine County High, in two. West Jessamine inherited the former Jessamine County High's nickname of Colts.

== Athletics ==
- Archery (coeducational)
- Baseball (boys only)
- Basketball (separate boys and girls)
- Bowling (separate boys and girls)
- Cheerleading squad (coeducational)
- Cross country team (coeducational, but boys and girls compete separately at the state level)
- Dance team
- Football (boys only)
- Golf (separate boys and girls)
- Rugby (coeducational)
- Soccer (separate boys and girls)
- Fastpitch softball (girls only)
- Tennis (separate boys and girls)
- Track (separate boys and girls)
- Volleyball (girls only)
- Swim Team (coeducational, but boys and girls compete separately at the state level)
- Wrestling (coeducational)
- Marching Band (coeducational)

== Academics ==
West Jessamine High School has the following academic departments:

- Agriculture
- Alternative
- Business
- Family and Consumer Science
- Fine Arts
- Fresh Start
- Language Arts
- Mathematics
- Physical Education
- Science
- Social Studies
- Special Education
- Technology Education
- World Languages

== Extracurricular activities ==
West Jessamine's varsity football team has made a number of state playoffs appearances, most recently in 2005. The JV and freshman football teams have also had some recent success, going a combined 7–2 in the 2007 season. In the 2009 football season West Jessamine's football team went a record 9–3, most wins in school history, and won their first playoff game against Harrison County High School, but was defeated by Boyle County, who would later win the state championship.

The boys' varsity basketball team has made a number of state tournament appearances as well, including 2005's Sweet Sixteen run. In 2009 they made it to the Final Four in basketball. The boys' baseball, girls' softball, boys' and girls' soccer, and boys' and girls' track and cross country teams have all also achieved status among the better programs in the state; West Jessamine's two-state athletics championship came in girls' slow-pitch softball and girls' golf.

The West Jessamine girls' soccer team is under the head coaching of Kevin Wright. Miss Kentucky Soccer 2010 was senior Arin Gilliland, who completed her career at West as a Parade All American and a member of the U20 National Team and several years on the Kentucky All-State team. The Lady Colts made school history in the 2011 season by reaching the KHSAA Soccer Final Four, although they lost to the eventual state champion in the Final Four game.

The boys' golf team is arguably the school's most successful sports team in recent years, having won the State Championship in both 2012 and 2013.

The archery team is the only mixed-gender athletic program in the school. The team was re-established in the fall of 2012 after several years without funding. The team practices at the Providence Activity Center alongside the East Jessamine team, as both teams have the same coaches. West and East hosted 2013 pre-regional and the 2014 regional and pre-regional tournaments. West shot in the 2013 State, National, and World Tournaments, held in Louisville, Kentucky, and St. Louis, Missouri, respectively. The archery team is the only athletic team in West Jessamine's history to compete at a higher competition level than the state.

The chorus program at West Jessamine High School has a reputation as one of the best in the state of Kentucky, receiving distinguished ratings. Elite voices in the chorus ensembles have represented West Jessamine High School at the Kentucky Governor's School for the Arts majoring in Vocal Music. Three individuals have been selected in the past two years, two who attended as sophomores.

The band program at West Jessamine High School has received numerous "distinguished" ratings over the past several years. The band program consists of five major components - marching band, symphonic band, indoor percussion, pep band, and jazz band.

- Marching Band
  - In 2004, the West Jessamine High School Marching Band, under the direction of Steven Page, placed 16th in Class 3A at the KMEA (Kentucky Music Education Association)State Marching Band Semifinals.
  - In 2005, with band director Steven Page, the marching band placed 8th, Distinguished rating, in the Class 4A KMEA State Marching Band Semifinals with their show "En La Oscuridad," which is translated as "Into the Darkness." In spring 2006, while still under the direction of Steven Page, the concert band won the prestigious Dixie Classic music festival in the Overall Honor Group category, scoring higher than the bands competing in Virginia Beach from across the country.
  - In 2006, they placed 7th overall, Distinguished rating, in Class 4A KMEA State Marching Band Semifinals with their show "A Heart Divided",. They were under the direction of Rex Payton.
  - In 2007, the West Jessamine High School Marching Band placed 10th in Class 4A KMEA State Marching Band Semifinals with their show "Four".
  - Along with that, the band also received numerous best percussion awards and a few best color guard awards in their 2008 season in the Class 4A KMEA State Marching Band Semifinals with their show "Pulse." The show brought the band to 5th place in the Class 4A KMEA State Marching Band Semifinals, and just barely kept them out of state finals, with only two points between them and the fourth place band.
  - In 2009, under new band director, Michael White, the band performed "The Pursuit", in which they placed 5th, Distinguished rating, in the Class 4A KMEA State Marching Band Semifinals, falling short of making Finals by .09 points.
  - In 2010, the band performed the Show entitled "From the Ashes", under the direction of Michael White. They earned 7th place, Distinguished rating, in the Class 4A KMEA State Marching Band Semifinals and 4th Place Mid-States Class 3A Marching Band Championship.
  - In 2011, under the direction of Michael White, the West Jessamine Colts Band made school history by with their Class 4A KMEA State Marching Band Semifinals performance on October 29, 2011, at Barren County High School. That performance earned them the title of a KMEA State Finalist, Distinguished rating, and sent them to the KMEA Finals Championship at Western Kentucky University that same evening. The Colts finished in fourth place, thereby placing them as the 4th best high school marching band in the 4A division in the Commonwealth of Kentucky.
- Drumline
  - The drumline brought home the silver medal from the Tri-State Indoor Drumline and Guard Circuit in the winter of 2006 in class Independent A with the show "High Octane." In 2008, they set up an indoor drumline to train future marching band percussionists. The show was entitled "Paradox."

The school's Drama and Musical Theater program, under the theatrical direction of Edie Moon and Hallie Brinkerhoff and with assistance from the other arts departments at the high school, has performed plays and musicals such as Antigone, Wait Until Dark, Joseph and the Amazing Technicolor Dreamcoat, Fiddler on the Roof, The Real Inspector Hound, and The Crucible. In the fall of 2007, the high school performed the play On the Verge. Also, in the fall of 2006 the drama department entered Antigone into the yearly competition sponsored by the Kentucky Theater Association. The school's drama department won the "Best Newcomer" award. Out of all actors attending, three out of ten were chosen from West Jessamine High School as "most talented".

== May 18th Tornado ==
The May 18th, 1995 Tornado in Jessamine County left a lasting impact on West Jessamine High School, causing extensive damage and resulting in numerous injuries. According to WKYT, the storm inflicted more than $2 million in structural damage to the school and left as many as 30 people injured, with one of the injuries being serious. The tornado struck the school right as students were arriving on buses, causing significant destruction to the transportation fleet. Out of the 11 buses that were present, all of them sustained damage from the storm.

The agricultural program at West Jessamine High School also suffered severe losses due to the tornado. A tobacco barn and greenhouse, utilized by the program, were completely flattened by the powerful winds. This destruction not only affected the physical structures but also had a profound impact on the educational resources available to the students involved in the agriculture program.

Initially, the National Weather Service (NWS) had initially classified the damage as caused by straight-line winds. However, after further investigation, the NWS reevaluated their ruling and reclassified it as a high-end F2 tornado. This decision was based on a combination of factors, including eyewitness accounts, video and photo evidence, and a comprehensive damage analysis. The reassessment by the NWS confirmed that the destructive force experienced at West Jessamine High School was indeed the result of a tornado, underscoring the magnitude of the event and the challenges faced by the school and its community in its aftermath.

The findings regarding the May 18th, 1995 Tornado in Jessamine County underwent a notable update in classification, shifting from the Enhanced Fujita (EF) scale to the original Fujita (F) scale. The National Weather Service (NWS) made this announcement more than 20 years after the storm occurred. The reclassification was preceded by a previous announcement in May, when the NWS reclassified the tornado that struck West Jessamine High School as an F2 tornado. The NWS investigative team released their final report on Friday, providing further details about the tornado's intensity. The wind speeds of the tornado were revised to 145-miles-per-hour for the Jessamine County area.

The decision to use the F-scale instead of the EF-scale was driven by a focus on wind speed rather than structural damage. The NWS aimed to gather substantial evidence, including video recordings, photographs, and eyewitness accounts, to confirm and align with the wind speeds measured during the storm. John Gordon, a Meteorologist with the National Weather Service Louisville, explained the challenges and complexities involved in the investigation, comparing it to solving a puzzle where a few pieces were missing. The reclassification highlighted the dedication and efforts put forth by the NWS in unraveling the true nature of the tornado and accurately characterizing its impact.
