= 2013–14 Ole Miss Rebels women's basketball team =

Intercollegiate basketball season

2013–14 Ole Miss Rebels women's basketball
- Conference: Southeastern Conference
- Record: 12–20 (2–14 SEC)
- Head coach: Matt Insell (1st season)
- Assistant coaches: Alex Simmons; Tai Dillard; Todd Schaefer
- Home arena: Tad Smith Coliseum

2013–14 SEC women's basketball standings
	Conf.				Overall
Team	W		L	PCT	W		L	PCT
No. 8 South Carolina	14	–	2	.875	29	–	5	.853
No. 3 Tennessee †	13	–	3	.813	29	–	6	.829
No. 15 Texas A&M	13	–	3	.813	27	–	9	.750
No. 10 Kentucky	10	–	6	.625	26	–	9	.743
Florida	8	–	8	.500	20	–	13	.606
Georgia	7	–	9	.438	20	–	12	.625
LSU	7	–	9	.438	21	–	13	.618
Vanderbilt	7	–	9	.438	18	–	13	.581
Auburn	7	–	9	.438	19	–	15	.559
Alabama	7	–	9	.438	14	–	16	.467
Arkansas	6	–	10	.375	19	–	11	.633
Missouri	6	–	10	.375	17	–	14	.548
Mississippi State	5	–	11	.313	22	–	14	.611
Ole Miss	2	–	14	.125	12	–	20	.375
† 2014 SEC tournament winner As of 10:03, 1 April 2014 (UTC); Rankings from AP poll

The 2013–14 Ole Miss Rebels women's basketball team represented University of Mississippi during the 2013–14 NCAA Division I women's basketball season. The Rebels, who were led by first-year head coach Matt Insell, played their home games at Tad Smith Coliseum and are a members of the Southeastern Conference.

== Roster ==
#	Name	Height	Position	Class	Hometown
00	Hasina Muhammad	6'1"	G	Junior	Memphis, TN
1	Meagan Tucker	5'8"	G	Freshman	Covington, GA
3	Allina Starr	5'10"	G	Freshman	Minneapolis, MN
10	Brandy Montgomery	5'10"	G	Freshman	Port St. Lucie, FL
12	Keonna Farmer	6'1"	G/F	Freshman	Birmingham, AL
13	Katie Frerking	6'1"	G/F	Freshman	Johns Creek, GA
21	Melinda Brimfield	6'0"	F	Junior	Norway, SC
22	Kiani Parker	5'9"	G	Junior	Fort Walton Beach, FL
32	Tyrese Tanner	6'1"	G/F	Senior	Birmingham, AL
34	Peyton Davis	6'5"	C	Senior	Pinson, AL
35	Cabriana Capers	6'1"	F	Sophomore	Bolingbrook, IL
40	Khady Dieng	5'10"	G	Freshman	Dakar, Senegal
44	Tra'Cee Tanner	6'3"	F/C	Sophomore	Birmingham, AL

== Schedule ==
Date time, TV	Rank^{#}	Opponent^{#}	Result	Record	Site (attendance) city, state
Exhibition
Nov. 2, 2013*; 2:00 p.m.		Christian Brothers	W 74–59	–	Tad Smith Coliseum (N/A); Oxford, MS
Regular Season
Nov. 8, 2013*; 5:00 p.m.		Jacksonville State	W 83–62	1–0	Tad Smith Coliseum (N/A); Oxford, MS
Nov. 10, 2013*; 2:00 p.m.		Central Arkansas	L 63–66	1–1	Tad Smith Coliseum (590); Oxford, MS
Nov. 15, 2013*; 8:30 p.m.		vs. West Virginia; Rainbow Wahine Classic	L 56–86	1–2	Stan Sheriff Center (N/A); Honolulu, HI
Nov. 16, 2013*; 6:30 p.m.		at Hawaiʻi; Rainbow Wahine Classic	L 63–79	1–3	Stan Sheriff Center (N/A); Honolulu, HI
Nov. 17, 2013*; 6:30 p.m.		vs. Washington State; Rainbow Wahine Classic	L 65–79	1–4	Stan Sheriff Center (N/A); Honolulu, HI
Nov. 22, 2013*; 5:00 p.m.		Southeastern Louisiana	W 96–69	2–4	Tad Smith Coliseum (N/A); Oxford, MS
Nov. 24, 2013*; 2:00 p.m.		Tennessee State	W 77–61	3–4	Tad Smith Coliseum (612); Oxford, MS
Nov. 26, 2013*; 5:30 p.m.		Louisiana-Monroe	W 78–72	4–4	Tad Smith Coliseum (6,511); Oxford, MS
Nov. 30, 2014*; 2:00 p.m.		at Tulane	W 89–66	5–4	Devlin Fieldhouse (316); New Orleans, LA
Dec. 4, 2013*; 11:00 a.m.		Louisiana Tech	W 79–68	6–4	Tad Smith Coliseum (4,491); Oxford, MS
Dec. 7, 2013*; 12:00 p.m.		Mississippi Valley State	W 72–60	7–4	Tad Smith Coliseum (385); Oxford, MS
Dec. 16, 2013*; 7:05 p.m.		at South Alabama	W 72–56	8–4	Mitchell Center (512); Mobile, AL
Dec. 18, 2013*; 6:00 p.m., FSSW+		at No. 9 Baylor	L 80–87	8–5	Ferrell Center (6,723); Waco, TX
Dec. 30, 2013*; 11:30 a.m.		Austin Peay	W 99–69	9–5	Tad Smith Coliseum (500); Oxford, MS
Jan. 2, 2014; 6:00 p.m.		Missouri	L 76–85	9–6 (0–1)	Tad Smith Coliseum (462); Oxford, MS
Jan. 9, 2014; 6:00 p.m., CSS		at No. 8 Tennessee	L 70–94	9–7 (0–2)	Thompson–Boling Arena (10,382); Knoxville, TN
Jan. 12, 2014; 2:00 p.m.		at Alabama	L 79–93	9–8 (0–3)	Foster Auditorium (2,561); Tuscaloosa, AL
Jan. 16, 2014; 6:00 p.m.		No. 24 Vanderbilt	L 74–80	9–9 (0–4)	Tad Smith Coliseum (354); Oxford, MS
Jan. 19, 2014; 2:00 p.m., CST		at Arkansas	L 65–68	9–10 (0–5)	Bud Walton Arena (1,975); Fayetteville, AR
Jan. 23, 2014; 6:00 p.m.		Mississippi State	W 87–85 ^{OT}	10–10 (1–5)	Tad Smith Coliseum (1,107); Oxford, MS
Jan. 26, 2014; 1:00 p.m., SEC TV		No. 15 LSU	L 56–66	10–11 (1–6)	Tad Smith Coliseum (737); Oxford, MS
Jan. 30, 2014; 6:00 p.m.		at No. 7 South Carolina	L 70–99	10–12 (1–7)	Colonial Life Arena (5,344); Columbia, SC
Feb. 2, 2014; 1:00 p.m.		Florida	L 60–81	10–13 (1–8)	Tad Smith Coliseum (532); Oxford, MS
Feb. 6, 2014; 6:00 p.m., CSS		No. 8 Tennessee	L 65–77	10–14 (1–9)	Tad Smith Coliseum (882); Oxford, MS
Feb. 9, 2014; 1:00 p.m., CSS		at Georgia	L 63–84	10–15 (1–10)	Stegeman Coliseum (4,250); Athens, GA
Feb. 13, 2014; 6:00 p.m., SPSO		at No. 18 Kentucky	L 78–108	10–16 (1–11)	Memorial Coliseum (6,530); Lexington, KY
Feb. 20, 2014; 6:00 p.m.		No. 16 Texas A&M	L 61–73	10–17 (1–12)	Tad Smith Coliseum (557); Oxford, MS
Feb. 23, 2014; 2:00 p.m.		at Mississippi State	L 70–72 ^{OT}	10–18 (1–13)	Humphrey Coliseum (3,155); Starkville, MS
Feb. 27, 2014; 7:00 p.m., SPSO		at Missouri	L 72–75	10–19 (1–14)	Mizzou Arena (2,034); Columbia, MO
Mar. 2, 2014; 2:00 p.m.		at Auburn	W 73–71 ^{OT}	11–19 (2–14)	Auburn Arena (935); Auburn, AL
2014 SEC women's basketball tournament
Mar. 5, 2014; 5:00 p.m., SPSO	No. (14)	vs. No. (11) Arkansas; First round	W 63–62	12–19	Arena at Gwinnett Center (2,044); Duluth, GA
Mar. 6, 2014; 7:30 p.m., SPSO	No. (14)	vs. No. (6) Auburn; Second round	L 54–70	12–20	Arena at Gwinnett Center (3,152); Duluth, GA
*Non-conference game. ^{#}Rankings from AP Poll. (#) Tournament seedings in parentheses. All times are in Pacific Time.

== See also ==
2013–14 Ole Miss Rebels men's basketball team
