= 2013–14 Alabama Crimson Tide women's basketball team =

Intercollegiate basketball season

2013–14 Alabama Crimson Tide women's basketball
- Conference: Southeastern Conference
- Record: 14–16 (7–9 SEC)
- Head coach: Kristy Curry (1st season)
- Assistant coaches: Kelly Curry; Terry Nooner; Shereka Wright
- Home arena: Foster Auditorium

2013–14 SEC women's basketball standings
	Conf.				Overall
Team	W		L	PCT	W		L	PCT
No. 8 South Carolina	14	–	2	.875	29	–	5	.853
No. 3 Tennessee †	13	–	3	.813	29	–	6	.829
No. 15 Texas A&M	13	–	3	.813	27	–	9	.750
No. 10 Kentucky	10	–	6	.625	26	–	9	.743
Florida	8	–	8	.500	20	–	13	.606
Georgia	7	–	9	.438	20	–	12	.625
LSU	7	–	9	.438	21	–	13	.618
Vanderbilt	7	–	9	.438	18	–	13	.581
Auburn	7	–	9	.438	19	–	15	.559
Alabama	7	–	9	.438	14	–	16	.467
Arkansas	6	–	10	.375	19	–	11	.633
Missouri	6	–	10	.375	17	–	14	.548
Mississippi State	5	–	11	.313	22	–	14	.611
Ole Miss	2	–	14	.125	12	–	20	.375
† 2014 SEC tournament winner As of 10:03, 1 April 2014 (UTC); Rankings from AP poll

The 2013–14 Alabama Crimson Tide women's basketball team represented the University of Alabama in the 2013–14 college basketball season. The Crimson Tide, led by first year head coach Kristy Curry, played their games at Foster Auditorium and are members of the Southeastern Conference.

== Roster ==
2013–14 Alabama Crimson Tide women's basketball team
Players
Coaches

Pos.	#	Name	Height	Year	Previous school	Hometown
F	3	Khadijah Carter	6 ft 1 in (1.85 m)	So	Jacksonville College	Goodrich, Texas
G	4	Emily Davis	6 ft 1 in (1.85 m)	So	Enterprise HS	Enterprise, Ala.
F/C	34	Oceana Hamilton	6 ft 4 in (1.93 m)	Fr	St. Edmund Campion	Mississauga, Ontario, Canada
F	13	Nikki Hegstetter	6 ft 2 in (1.88 m)	So	Harrison HS	Kennesaw, Ga.
G	2	Courtney Hunter	5 ft 9 in (1.75 m)	Fr	Hoover HS	Hoover, Ala.
F	25	Briana Hutchen	6 ft 1 in (1.85 m)	Jr	Rutgers	Baltimore, Md.
F	32	Brittany Jack	6 ft 0 in (1.83 m)	Jr	Samford	Suwanee, Ga.
C	14	Brooksie McGraw	6 ft 3 in (1.91 m)	Fr	P. K. Yonge HS	Gainesville, Fla.
G	22	Karyla Middlebrook	5 ft 7 in (1.7 m)	Fr	Blue Springs HS	Blue Springs, Mo.
G	12	Shafontaye Myers	5 ft 8 in (1.73 m)	Sr	Sunshine HS	Newbern, Ala.
F	23	Kara Rawls	6 ft 0 in (1.83 m)	Fr	Hoover HS	Hoover, Ala.
G	33	Sharin Rivers	5 ft 3 in (1.6 m)	Jr	Shelton State	Huntsville, Ala.
G	0	Daisha Simmons	5 ft 10 in (1.78 m)	Jr	Rutgers	Jersey City, N.J.
G	1	Jasmine Steele	5 ft 1 in (1.55 m)	RS Fr	Midfield HS	Midfield, Ala.
G	15	Erika Waters	5 ft 6 in (1.68 m)	Sr	Peachtree Ridge HS	Lawrenceville, Ga.
F	20	Ashley Williams	6 ft 0 in (1.83 m)	Fr	Alcovy HS	Covington, Ga.

Head coach

Kristy Curry

Assistant coach(es)

Kelly Curry
Terry Nooner
Shereka Wright

Legend

- (C) Team captain
- (S) Suspended
- (I) Ineligible
- (W) Walk-on
- Injured
- Current redshirt

Roster
Last update: 2013-08-14

== Schedule ==
Date time, TV	Rank^{#}	Opponent^{#}	Result	Record	Site (attendance) city, state
Exhibition
Nov. 4, 2013*; 7:00 p.m.		West Alabama	W 73–31	–	Foster Auditorium (646); Tuscaloosa, AL
Regular Season
Nov. 8, 2013*; 6:30 p.m.		at Chattanooga	L 72–80	0–1	McKenzie Arena (3,633); Chattanooga, TN
Nov. 11, 2013*; 7:00 p.m.		at No. 15 Nebraska	L 48–62	0–2	Pinnacle Bank Arena (4,924); Lincoln, NE
Nov. 17, 2013*; 1:00 p.m.		at No. 2 Duke	L 57–92	0–3	Cameron Indoor Stadium (4,009); Durham, NC
Nov. 21, 2013*; 7:00 p.m.		Wisconsin	W 70–62	1–3	Foster Auditorium (1,229); Tuscaloosa, AL
Nov. 25, 2013*; 7:00 p.m.		Alabama A&M	W 60–32	2–3	Foster Auditorium (1,041); Tuscaloosa, AL
Nov. 29, 2013*; 4:00 p.m.		at Saint Mary's; Hilton Concord Thanksgiving Classic	L 76–86	2–4	McKeon Pavilion (575); Moraga, CA
Nov. 30, 2013*; 2:00 p.m.		vs. Cal State Fullerton; Hilton Concord Thanksgiving Classic	W 69–54	3–4	McKeon Pavilion (102); Moraga, CA
Dec. 4, 2013*; 7:00 p.m.		Tennessee-Martin	L 57–75	3–5	Foster Auditorium (957); Tuscaloosa, AL
Dec. 8, 2013*; 2:00 p.m.		Houston	W 51–44	4–5	Foster Auditorium (847); Tuscaloosa, AL
Dec. 17, 2013*; 11:00 a.m.		Jacksonville	W 75–62	5–5	Foster Auditorium (2,067); Tuscaloosa, AL
Dec. 20, 2013*; 7:00 p.m.		Troy	W 113–105 ^{OT}	6–5	Foster Auditorium (2,104); Tuscaloosa, AL
Dec. 28, 2013*; 11:00 a.m.		vs. Princeton; Cavalier Classic	L 59–79	6–6	John Paul Jones Arena (3,543); Charlottesville, VA
Dec. 29, 2013*; 11:00 a.m.		vs. Coppin State; Cavalier Classic	W 82–60	7–6	John Paul Jones Arena (N/A); Charlottesville, VA
Jan. 2, 2014; 2:00 p.m.		No. 6 Kentucky	L 63–85	7–7 (0–1)	Foster Auditorium (1,639); Tuscaloosa, AL
Jan. 5, 2014; 2:00 p.m.		at Texas A&M	L 58–73	7–8 (0–2)	Reed Arena (5,385); College Station, TX
Jan. 12, 2014; 2:00 p.m.		Ole Miss	W 93–79	8–8 (1–2)	Foster Auditorium (2,561); Tuscaloosa, AL
Jan. 16, 2014; 7:00 p.m.		Auburn	L 39–61	8–9 (1–3)	Foster Auditorium (2,453); Tuscaloosa, AL
Jan. 19, 2014; 2:00 p.m.		at No. 8 South Carolina	L 51–77	8–10 (1–4)	Colonial Life Arena (7,740); Columbia, SC
Jan. 23, 2014; 6:00 p.m.		at No. 9 Kentucky	W 57–55	9–10 (2–4)	Memorial Coliseum (4,722); Lexington, KY
Jan. 26, 2014; 2:00 p.m., CSS		Georgia	W 69–66	10–10 (3–4)	Foster Auditorium (2,678); Tuscaloosa, AL
Jan. 30, 2014; 6:00 p.m., FSFL		at Florida	L 67–75	10–11 (3–5)	O'Connell Center (1,431); Gainesville, FL
Feb. 2, 2014; 3:30 p.m., ESPNU		No. 10 Tennessee	L 54–64	10–12 (3–6)	Foster Auditorium (3,002); Tuscaloosa, AL
Feb. 9, 2014; 2:00 p.m.		at Missouri	W 59–56	11–12 (4–6)	Mizzou Arena (2,356); Columbia, MO
Feb 13, 2014; 2:00 p.m.		at Arkansas	L 55–75	11–13 (4–7)	Bud Walton Arena (1,131); Fayetteville, AR
Feb. 16, 2014; 12:00 p.m., SPSO		No. 14 Texas A&M	L 46–71	11–14 (4–8)	Foster Auditorium (2,359); Tuscaloosa, AL
Feb. 20, 2014; 7:00 p.m.		Mississippi State	W 72–64 ^{OT}	12–14 (5–8)	Foster Auditorium (2,415); Tuscaloosa, AL
Feb. 23, 2014; 7:00 p.m., CSS		at Vanderbilt	W 66–62	13–14 (6–8)	Memorial Gymnasium (3,479); Nashville, TN
Feb. 27, 2014; 6:00 p.m.		at Auburn	L 65–70 ^{2OT}	13–15 (6–9)	Auburn Arena (3,649); Auburn, AL
Mar. 2, 2014; 1:00 p.m., SEC TV		LSU	W 78–60	14–15 (7–9)	Foster Auditorium (2,536); Tuscaloosa, AL
2014 SEC women's basketball tournament
Mar. 6, 2014; 5:00 p.m., SPSO	No. (7)	vs. No. (10) LSU; Second round	L 65–78	14–16	Arena at Gwinnett Center (3,152); Duluth, GA
*Non-conference game. ^{#}Rankings from AP Poll. (#) Tournament seedings in parentheses. All times are in Central Time.

== See also ==
2013–14 Alabama Crimson Tide men's basketball team
