= 2013–14 Texas A&M Aggies women's basketball team =

Intercollegiate basketball season

2013–14 Texas A&M Aggies women's basketball

NCAA tournament, Elite Eight
- Conference: Southeastern Conference

Ranking
- Coaches: No. 14
- AP: No. 15
- Record: 27–9 (13–3 SEC)
- Head coach: Gary Blair (11th season)
- Assistant coaches: Kelly Bond-White (11th season); Bob Starkey (2nd season); Amy Wright (2nd season)
- Home arena: Reed Arena

2013–14 SEC women's basketball standings
	Conf.				Overall
Team	W		L	PCT	W		L	PCT
No. 8 South Carolina	14	–	2	.875	29	–	5	.853
No. 3 Tennessee †	13	–	3	.813	29	–	6	.829
No. 15 Texas A&M	13	–	3	.813	27	–	9	.750
No. 10 Kentucky	10	–	6	.625	26	–	9	.743
Florida	8	–	8	.500	20	–	13	.606
Georgia	7	–	9	.438	20	–	12	.625
LSU	7	–	9	.438	21	–	13	.618
Vanderbilt	7	–	9	.438	18	–	13	.581
Auburn	7	–	9	.438	19	–	15	.559
Alabama	7	–	9	.438	14	–	16	.467
Arkansas	6	–	10	.375	19	–	11	.633
Missouri	6	–	10	.375	17	–	14	.548
Mississippi State	5	–	11	.313	22	–	14	.611
Ole Miss	2	–	14	.125	12	–	20	.375
† 2014 SEC tournament winner As of 10:03, 1 April 2014 (UTC); Rankings from AP poll

The 2013–14 Texas A&M Aggies women's basketball team represented Texas A&M University during the 2013–14 college basketball season. The team were led by 11th year head coach Gary Blair, and played their home games at the Reed Arena in College Station, Texas as second season members of the Southeastern Conference. They finished the season 27–9 overall, 13–3 during SEC play, and finished in a tie for second place. As the No. 2 seed in the 2014 SEC women's basketball tournament, they advanced to the semifinals, where they were defeated by Tennessee.

The team received an at-large bid to the NCAA tournament as a No. 3 seed in the Lincoln Regional. They defeated North Dakota in the first round, James Madison in the second round and DePaul in the Sweet Sixteen to advance to the Elite Eight. There, they lost to eventual national champion, and the No. 1 ranked UConn Huskies 54–69.

== Roster ==
#	Name	Position	Height	Class	Hometown	Last college or high school
1	Courtney Williams	F/G	6–1	So.	Houston, Texas	North Shore
3	Taylor Cooper	F	6–0	So.	Shawnee, Oklahoma	Oral Roberts; Shawnee
5	Cristina Sanchez-Quintanar	G	5–7	Sr.	Campo de Criptana, Spain	Maryland; Ministry of Science/Education
10	Allison Chu	G	5–6	So.	Plano, Texas	Plano
11	Curtyce Knox	G	5-7	RS Fr.	Humble, Texas	Atascocita
12	Jada Terry	C	6–3	Fr.	Cedar Hill, Texas	Cedar Hill
13	Chelsea Jennings	G	5–9	So.	Fort Worth, Texas	North Crowley
14	Kristen Grant	G	5–9	Sr.	Arlington, Texas	Lamar
15	Tori Scott	G	5–10	Jr.	Marrero, Louisiana	John Ehret
23	Rachel Mitchell	C	6–7	So.	Houston, Texas	Atascocita
24	Jordan Jones	G	5–6	So.	DeSoto, Texas	DeSoto
32	Tavarsha Scott	F	6–0	Jr.	Ringgold, Louisiana	Northwest Florida State College; Ringgold High School
33	Courtney Walker	G	5–8	So.	Edmond, Oklahoma	Santa Fe
34	Karla Gilbert	C	6–5	Sr.	College Station, Texas	A&M Consolidated
35	Achiri Ade	F	6–1	Jr.	Baltimore, Maryland	Midland JC; Seton Keough

== Schedule and results ==
Date time, TV	Rank^{#}	Opponent^{#}	Result	Record	High points	High rebounds	High assists	Site (attendance) city, state
Exhibition
November 3, 2013*; 5:00 p.m., 12thManTV	No. 16	Oklahoma City	W 103–60	-	18 – Gilbert	8 – Gilbert	7 – Jones	Reed Arena (3,585); College Station, TX
Non-conference games
November 11, 2013*; 7:00 p.m.	No. 16	at North Texas	W 67–48	1–0	14 – Ade	8 – Ade	5 – Jones	The Super Pit (1,791); Denton, TX
November 13, 2013*; 7:00 p.m., 12thManTV	No. 16	Prairie View A&M	W 76–27	2–0	15 – Gilbert	7 – Gilbert	10 – Jones	Reed Arena (4,053); College Station, TX
November 17, 2013*; 3:30 p.m.	No. 16	at Houston	W 63–51	3–0	19 – Walker	11 – Ade & Williams	6 – Jones & Walker	Hofheinz Pavilion (942); Houston, TX
November 28, 2013*; 5:00 p.m., TGVN.tv	No. 12	vs. Memphis; Paradise Jam tournament	W 69–59	4–0	19 – Scott	14 – Gilbert	4 – Jones	Sports and Fitness Center (N/A); Saint Thomas, U.S. Virgin Islands
November 29, 2013*; 5:00 p.m., TGVN.tv	No. 12	vs. Texas; Paradise Jam Tournament	L 58–69	4–1	15 – Walker	7 – Gilbert	3 – Knox	Sports and Fitness Center (N/A); Saint Thomas, U.S. Virgin Islands
November 30, 2013*; 7:15 p.m., TGVN.tv	No. 12	vs. Syracuse; Paradise Jam Tournament	L 63–78	4–2	26 – Walker	7 – Gilbert, Ade	3 – Knox	Sports and Fitness Center (N/A); Saint Thomas, U.S. Virgin Islands
December 3, 2013*; 7:00 p.m., 12thManTV	No. 23	San Diego State	W 72–35	5–2	16 – Gilbert	12 – Williams	10 – Jones	Reed Arena (4,023); College Station, TX
December 7, 2013*; 7:00 p.m., 12thManTV	No. 23	Washington	W 74–68	6–2	13 – Williams	15 – Gilbert	8 – Jones	Reed Arena (4,169); College Station, TX
December 15, 2013*; 1:00 p.m.	No. 24	at No. 12 Penn State	L 58–66	6–3	20 – Walker	10 – Gilbert	7 – Knox	Bryce Jordan Center (4,777); University Park, PA
December 17, 2013*; 11:00 am, 12thManTV	No. 24	Nicholls State	W 73–39	7–3	14 – Williams	8 – 2 tied	5 – Walker	Reed Arena (7,188); College Station, TX
December 22, 2013*; 10:00 am, ESPNU		vs. St. John's; Maggie Dixon Classic	L 70–72	7–4	15 – Gilbert	6 – Walker	7 – Walker	Madison Square Garden (5,468); New York City, NY
December 28, 2013*; 7:00 p.m., 12thManTV		Louisiana Tech	W 80–52	8–4	22 – Williams	10 – Williams	13 – Jones	Reed Arena (4,544); College Station, TX
December 30, 2013*; 7:00 p.m., 12thManTV		Arkansas State	W 80–62	9–4	27 – Williams	10 – Ade	8 – Jones	Reed Arena (4,172); College Station, TX
January 2, 2014*; 6:00 p.m., 12thManTV		UTEP	W 74–58	10–4	21 – Williams	8 – Ade	9 – Jones	Reed Arena (4,052); College Station, TX
Conference games
January 5, 2014; 2:00 p.m., 12thManTV		Alabama	W 73–58	11–4 (1–0)	23 – Williams	12 – Ade	4 – 4 tied	Reed Arena (5,385); College Station, TX
January 9, 2014; 6:00 p.m., CST		at LSU	W 52–48	12–4 (2–0)	17 – Williams	7 – Williams	4 – Jones	Pete Maravich Assembly Center (2,786); Baton Rouge, LA
January 12, 2014; 1:00 p.m., SEC TV		at No. 25 Georgia	W 58–44	13–4 (3–0)	16 – Walker	16 – Ade	7 – Jones	Stegeman Coliseum (3,420); Athens, GA
January 16, 2014; 7:00 p.m., FSSW+	No. 25	No. 8 South Carolina	W 67–65 ^{OT}	14–4 (4–0)	18 – Walker	9 – Williams	7 – Jones	Reed Arena (5,778); College Station, TX
January 19, 2014; 2:00 p.m., 12thManTV	No. 25	Mississippi State	W 73–35	15–4 (5–0)	16 – Walker	10 – Gilbert	9 – Jones	Reed Arena (5,318); College Station, TX
January 23, 2014; 7:00 p.m.	No. 17	at Missouri	W 62–57	16–4 (6–0)	21 – Walker	9 – Walker	4 – Jones & Knox	Mizzou Arena (1,185); Columbia, MO
January 26, 2014; 3:00 p.m., ESPN2	No. 17	No. 11 Tennessee	L 55–76	16–5 (6–1)	20 – Walker	11 – Gilbert	7 – Jones	Reed Arena (7,207); College Station, TX
January 30, 2014; 6:00 p.m.	No. 17	at Auburn	W 71–54	17–5 (7–1)	17 – Williams	10 – Ade	6 – Jones	Auburn Arena (2,780); Auburn, AL
February 2, 2014; 1:00 p.m., FSSW	No. 17	at No. 16 Vanderbilt	L 69–71	17–6 (7–2)	26 – Gilbert	12 – Gilbert	8 – Jones	Memorial Gymnasium (3,483); Nashville, TN
February 9, 2014; 1:30 p.m., FSSW	No. 19	No. 16 LSU	W 72–67	18–6 (8–2)	22 – Walker	7 – Ade & Walker	9 – Jones	Reed Arena (5,926); College Station, TX
February 13, 2014; 7:00 p.m., FSSW	No. 14	Georgia	W 78–73 ^{OT}	19–6 (9–2)	25 – Walker	8 – Ade	6 – Jones	Reed Arena (4,757); College Station, TX
February 16, 2014; 12:00 p.m., FSSW	No. 14	at Alabama	W 71–46	20–6 (10–2)	15 – Gilbert	7 – Ade	10 – Jones	Foster Auditorium (2,359); Tuscaloosa, AL
February 20, 2014; 6:00 p.m.	No. 16	at Ole Miss	W 73–61	21–6 (11–2)	26 – Williams	10 – Gilbert	6 – Jones	Tad Smith Coliseum (557); Oxford, MS
February 23, 2014; 1:00 p.m., ESPN2	No. 16	No. 15 Kentucky	L 74–83	21–7 (11–3)	26 – Walker	10 – Walker	8 – Jones	Reed Arena (7,343); College Station, TX
February 27, 2014; 7:00 p.m., FSSW	No. 17	Arkansas	W 77–54	22–7 (12–3)	19 – Jones	10 – Jones	10 – Jones	Reed Arena (6,631); College Station, TX
March 2, 2014; 12:00 p.m., CSS	No. 17	at Florida	W 83–72	23–7 (13–3)	23 – Gilbert	5 – Scott	14 – Jones	O'Connell Center (2,779); Gainesville, FL
2014 SEC Tournament
March 7, 2014; 7:30 p.m., SPSO	No. 15 (3)	vs. No. (6) Auburn; Quarterfinal	W 86–54	24–7	25 – Walker	7 – Gilbert	11 – Jones	Gwinnett Center (5,232); Duluth, GA
March 8, 2014; 1:30 p.m., ESPNU	No. 15 (3)	vs. No. 6 (2) Tennessee; Semifinal	L 77–86	24–8	26 – Walker	6 – Jones	10 – Jones	Gwinnett Center (6,306); Duluth, GA
NCAA tournament
Mar 23, 2014*; 7:00 p.m., ESPN2	(3 L) No. 15	(14 L) North Dakota; First Round	W 70–55	25–8	19 – Walker	8 – Walker & Gilbert	11 – Jones	Reed Arena (6,075); College Station, TX
Mar 25, 2014*; 8:30 p.m., ESPN2	(3 L) No. 15	(11 L) James Madison; Second Round	W 85–69	26–8	23 – Williams	15 – Gilbert	16 – Jones	Reed Arena (7,095); College Station, TX
Mar 29, 2014*; 6:00 p.m., ESPN	(3 L) No. 15	vs. (7 L) No. 23 DePaul; Sweet Sixteen	W 84–65	27–8	25 – Walker	7 – Williams & Ade	6 – Jones	Pinnacle Bank Arena (9,585); Lincoln, NE
Mar 31, 2014*; 8:30 p.m., ESPN	(3 L) No. 15	vs. (1 L) No. 1 UConn; Elite Eight	L 54–69	27–9	14 – Walker	7 – Jones	3 – Ade	Pinnacle Bank Arena (7,169); Lincoln, NE
*Non-conference game. ^{#}Rankings from AP Poll. (#) Tournament seedings in parentheses. L=Lincoln Region. All times are in Central Time.

== See also ==
- 2013–14 NCAA Division I women's basketball season
- 2013–14 NCAA Division I women's basketball rankings
- 2013–14 Texas A&M Aggies men's basketball team
