= 2013–14 Tennessee Lady Volunteers basketball team =

Intercollegiate basketball season

2013–14 Tennessee Lady Volunteers basketball

SEC tournament champions

NCAA tournament, Sweet Sixteen
- Conference: Southeastern Conference

Ranking
- Coaches: No. 8
- AP: No. 3
- Record: 29–5 (13–3 SEC)
- Head coach: Holly Warlick
- Assistant coaches: Kyra Elzy; Jolette Law; Dean Lockwood
- Home arena: Thompson–Boling Arena

2013–14 SEC women's basketball standings
	Conf.				Overall
Team	W		L	PCT	W		L	PCT
No. 8 South Carolina	14	–	2	.875	29	–	5	.853
No. 3 Tennessee †	13	–	3	.813	29	–	6	.829
No. 15 Texas A&M	13	–	3	.813	27	–	9	.750
No. 10 Kentucky	10	–	6	.625	26	–	9	.743
Florida	8	–	8	.500	20	–	13	.606
Georgia	7	–	9	.438	20	–	12	.625
LSU	7	–	9	.438	21	–	13	.618
Vanderbilt	7	–	9	.438	18	–	13	.581
Auburn	7	–	9	.438	19	–	15	.559
Alabama	7	–	9	.438	14	–	16	.467
Arkansas	6	–	10	.375	19	–	11	.633
Missouri	6	–	10	.375	17	–	14	.548
Mississippi State	5	–	11	.313	22	–	14	.611
Ole Miss	2	–	14	.125	12	–	20	.375
† 2014 SEC tournament winner As of 10:03, 1 April 2014 (UTC); Rankings from AP poll

The 2013–14 Tennessee Lady Volunteers basketball team represented the University of Tennessee in the 2013–14 college basketball season. The Lady Vols, led by 2nd year head coach Holly Warlick, played their games at Thompson–Boling Arena and were members of the Southeastern Conference.

== Roster ==
#	Name	Height	Position	Class	Hometown
0	Jordan Reynolds	5'11"	G	Freshman	Portland, Oregon
1	Nia Moore	6'3"	C	Sophomore	Chicago
2	Jasmine Jones	6'2"	F	Sophomore	Madison, Alabama
4	Jannah Tucker	6'0"	G	Freshman	Randallstown, Maryland
5	Ariel Massengale	5'7"	G	Junior	Bolingbrook, Illinois
10	Meighan Simmons	5'9"	G	Senior	Cibolo, Texas
11	Cierra Burdick	6'2"	F	Junior	Charlotte, North Carolina
12	Bashaara Graves	6'2"	F	Sophomore	Clarksville, Tennessee
14	Andraya Carter	5'9"	G	RS Freshman	Flowery Branch, Georgia
20	Isabelle Harrison	6'3"	C	Junior	Nashville, Tennessee
21	Mercedes Russell	6'6"	C	Freshman	Springfield, Oregon

== Schedule and results ==
Date time, TV	Rank^{#}	Opponent^{#}	Result	Record	Site (attendance) city, state
Exhibition
Nov. 4, 2013*; 7:00 p.m.	No. 4	Carson–Newman	W 115–31	–	Thompson–Boling Arena (10,507); Knoxville, Tennessee
Regular Season
Nov. 8, 2013*; 8:00 p.m., WUXP	No. 4	at Middle Tennessee State	W 67–57	1–0	Murphy Center (11,227); Murfreesboro, Tennessee
Nov. 11, 2013*; 9:00 p.m., ESPN2	No. 4	at No. 12 North Carolina	W 81–65	2–0	Carmichael Arena (4,923); Chapel Hill, North Carolina
Nov. 14, 2013*; 7:00 p.m.	No. 4	Chattanooga	W 80–56	3–0	Thompson–Boling Arena (10,508); Knoxville, Tennessee
Nov. 17, 2013*; 7:00 p.m., FSSO/FSTN	No. 4	Georgia Tech	W 87–76	4–0	Thompson–Boling Arena (10,364); Knoxville, Tennessee
Nov. 24, 2013*; 2:00 p.m.	No. 3	Oakland	W 84–50	5–0	Thompson–Boling Arena (10,313); Knoxville, Tennessee
Nov. 28, 2013*; 2:00 p.m.	No. 3	vs. Virginia; Junkanoo Jam	W 76–67	6–0	St. George HS Gymnasium (456); Freeport, BAH
Nov. 30, 2013*; 8:00 p.m.	No. 3	vs. SMU; Junkanoo Jam	W 87–47	7–0	St. George HS Gymnasium (563); Freeport, BAH
Dec. 8, 2013*; 1:00 p.m., FSSO/FSTN	No. 3	Texas	W 75–61	8–0	Thompson–Boling Arena (11,569); Knoxville, Tennessee
Dec. 14, 2013*; 2:00 p.m., SPSO	No. 3	Troy	W 103–64	9–0	Thompson–Boling Arena (11,358); Knoxville, Tennessee
Dec. 17, 2013*; 7:00 p.m.	No. 3	Tennessee State	W 94–43	10–0	Thompson–Boling Arena (9,607); Knoxville, Tennessee
Dec. 21. 2013*; 4:30 p.m., P12N	No. 3	at No. 6 Stanford; Rivalry	L 70–76	10–1	Maples Pavilion (6,044); Stanford, California
Dec. 29, 2013*; 2:00 p.m.	No. 5	Lipscomb	W 110–42	11–1	Thompson–Boling Arena (12,046); Knoxville, Tennessee
Jan. 2, 2014; 7:00 p.m., CSS	No. 5	No. 16 LSU	L 77–80	11–2 (0–1)	Thompson–Boling Arena (14,437); Knoxville, Tennessee
Jan. 5, 2014; 4:00 p.m., SPSO	No. 5	at No. 19 Georgia	W 85–70	12–2 (1–1)	Stegeman Coliseum (6,571); Athens, Georgia
Jan. 9, 2014; 7:00 p.m., CSS	No. 8	Ole Miss	W 94–70	13–2 (2–1)	Thompson–Boling Arena (10,382); Knoxville, Tennessee
Jan. 12, 2014; 5:00 p.m., ESPN	No. 8	at Vanderbilt; Rivalry	L 63–74	13–3 (2–2)	Memorial Gymnasium (9,412); Nashville, Tennessee
Jan. 16, 2014; 9:00 p.m., CSS	No. 12	at Mississippi State	W 67–63	14–3 (3–2)	Humphrey Coliseum (3,169); Starkville, Tennessee
Jan. 20, 2014*; 7:00 p.m., ESPN2	No. 11	No. 2 Notre Dame	L 70–86	14–4	Thompson–Boling Arena (13,346); Knoxville, Tennessee
Jan. 23, 2014; 6:30 p.m., SPSO	No. 11	Florida	W 89–69	15–4 (4–2)	Thompson–Boling Arena (10,541); Knoxville, Tennessee
Jan. 26, 2014; 4:00 p.m., ESPN2	No. 11	at No. 17 Texas A&M	W 76–55	16–4 (5–2)	Reed Arena (7,207); College Station, Texas
Jan. 30, 2014; 7:00 p.m., SPSO	No. 10	Arkansas	W 70–60	17–4 (6–2)	Thompson–Boling Arena (9,811); Knoxville, Tennessee
Feb. 2, 2014; 4:30 p.m., ESPNU	No. 10	at Alabama	W 64–54	18–4 (7–2)	Foster Auditorium (3,002); Tuscaloosa, Alabama
Feb. 6, 2014; 7:00 p.m., CSS	No. 8	at Ole Miss	W 77–65	19–4 (8–2)	Tad Smith Coliseum (882); Oxford, Mississippi
Feb. 10, 2014; 9:00 p.m., ESPN2	No. 8	No. 16 Vanderbilt; Rivalry	W 81–53	20–4 (9–2)	Thompson–Boling Arena (11,384); Knoxville, Tennessee
Feb. 16, 2014; 1:00 p.m., ESPN	No. 8	No. 18 Kentucky; Rivalry	L 71–75	20–5 (9–3)	Thompson–Boling Arena (15,664); Knoxville, Tennessee
Feb. 20, 2014; 7:00 p.m., CSS	No. 10	Auburn	W 93–63	21–5 (10–3)	Thompson–Boling Arena (10,111); Knoxville, Tennessee
Feb. 23, 2014; 2:00 p.m., SEC TV	No. 10	at Missouri	W 56–50	22–5 (11–3)	Mizzou Arena (5,017); Columbia, Missouri
Feb. 27, 2014; 9:00 p.m., CSS	No. 10	at LSU	W 72–67	23–5 (12–3)	Maravich Center (3,374); Baton Rouge, Louisiana
Mar. 2, 2014; 2:30 p.m., ESPNU	No. 10	No. 4 South Carolina	W 73–61	24–5 (13–3)	Thompson–Boling Arena (14,072); Knoxville, Tennessee
2014 SEC Tournament
Mar. 7, 2014; 6:00 p.m., SPSO	(2) No. 6	vs. (10) LSU; Quarterfinal	W 77–65	25–5	Arena at Gwinnett Center (5,232); Duluth, Georgia
Mar. 8, 2014; 2:30 p.m., ESPNU	(2) No. 6	vs. (3) No. 15 Texas A&M; Semifinal	W 86–77	26–5	Arena at Gwinnett Center (6,306); Duluth, Georgia
Mar. 9, 2014; 3:30 p.m., ESPN	(2) No. 6	vs. (4) No. 12 Kentucky; Championship game / Rivalry	W 71–70	27–5	Arena at Gwinnett Center (6,544); Duluth, Georgia
2014 NCAA Tournament
Mar. 22, 2014*; 4:00 p.m., ESPN2	(1) No. 3	(16) Northwestern State; First round	W 70–46	28–5	Thompson–Boling Arena (7,128); Knoxville, Tennessee
Mar. 24, 2014*; 4:00 p.m., ESPN2	(1) No. 3	St John's; Second Round	W 67–51	29–5	Thompson–Boling Arena (5,961); Knoxville, Tennessee
Mar. 30, 2014*; Noon, ESPN2	(1) No. 3	Maryland; Sweet Sixteen	L 62–73	29–6	KFC Yum Center (11,097); Louisville, Kentucky
*Non-conference game. ^{#}Rankings from AP Poll. (#) Tournament seedings in parentheses. All times are in Eastern Time.

== Rankings ==
Ranking movement Legend: ██ Increase in ranking. ██ Decrease in ranking. NR = Not ranked. RV = Received votes.
Poll	Pre	Wk 2	Wk 3	Wk 4	Wk 5	Wk 6	Wk 7	Wk 8	Wk 9	Wk 10	Wk 11	Wk 12	Wk 13	Wk 14	Wk 15	Wk 16	Wk 17	Wk 18	Wk 19	Final
AP	4	3	3	3	3	3	3	5	5	8	12	11	10	8	8	10	10	6	4	3
Coaches	4	3	4	4	3	3	3	5	5	8	10	12	10	8	8	10	9	6	3	8

== See also ==
2013–14 Tennessee Volunteers basketball team
