= 2013–14 Georgia Lady Bulldogs basketball team =

Intercollegiate basketball season

2013–14 Georgia Lady Bulldogs basketball

NCAA Women's Tournament, First Round
- Conference: Southeastern Conference
- Record: 20–11 (7–9 SEC)
- Head coach: Andy Landers (35th season)
- Assistant coaches: Joni Crenshaw; Angie Johnson; Robert Mosley
- Home arena: Stegeman Coliseum

2013–14 SEC women's basketball standings
	Conf.				Overall
Team	W		L	PCT	W		L	PCT
No. 8 South Carolina	14	–	2	.875	29	–	5	.853
No. 3 Tennessee †	13	–	3	.813	29	–	6	.829
No. 15 Texas A&M	13	–	3	.813	27	–	9	.750
No. 10 Kentucky	10	–	6	.625	26	–	9	.743
Florida	8	–	8	.500	20	–	13	.606
Georgia	7	–	9	.438	20	–	12	.625
LSU	7	–	9	.438	21	–	13	.618
Vanderbilt	7	–	9	.438	18	–	13	.581
Auburn	7	–	9	.438	19	–	15	.559
Alabama	7	–	9	.438	14	–	16	.467
Arkansas	6	–	10	.375	19	–	11	.633
Missouri	6	–	10	.375	17	–	14	.548
Mississippi State	5	–	11	.313	22	–	14	.611
Ole Miss	2	–	14	.125	12	–	20	.375
† 2014 SEC tournament winner As of 10:03, 1 April 2014 (UTC); Rankings from AP poll

The 2013–14 Georgia Lady Bulldogs women's basketball team represented University of Georgia in the 2013–14 college basketball season. The Lady Bulldogs, led by thirty-fifth year head coach Andy Landers, played their home games at Stegeman Coliseum, and were a member of the Southeastern Conference.

== Roster ==
2013–14 Georgia Bulldogs women's basketball team
Players
Coaches

Pos.	#	Name	Height	Year	Previous school	Hometown
G	1	Khaalidah Miller	5 ft 9 in (1.75 m)	Jr	Douglass HS	Atlanta, Ga.
F	2	Ebony Jones	6 ft 2 in (1.88 m)	Sr	Cedar Hill HS	Cedar Hill, Texas
G/F	3	Anne Marie Armstrong	6 ft 3 in (1.91 m)	Sr	Wesleyan School	Norcross, Ga.
G	4	Danielle Bennett	5 ft 10 in (1.78 m)	Sr	Hillsborough (Fla.) CC	Springfield, Mo.
G	10	Jasmine James	5 ft 9 in (1.75 m)	Sr	Bartlett HS	Memphis, Tenn.
G	11	Tiaria Griffin	5 ft 7 in (1.7 m)	Fr	Hattiesburg	Monticello, Miss.
F	12	Jasmine Hassell	6 ft 2 in (1.88 m)	Sr	Wilson Central HS	Lebanon, Tenn.
F	13	Merritt Hempe	6 ft 2 in (1.88 m)	Fr	Stafford	Fredericksburg, Va.
G/F	15	Krista Donald	5 ft 11 in (1.8 m)	So	Lake HS	Lake, Miss.
G/F	20	Shacobia Barbee	5 ft 10 in (1.78 m)	Fr	Riverdale	Murfreesboro, Tenn.
F	22	Kaelyn Causwell	6 ft 4 in (1.93 m)	Fr	Wesleyan School	Sacramento, Calif.
F	23	Tamika Willis	6 ft 2 in (1.88 m)	Sr	Westlake HS	College Park, Ga.
G	24	Marjorie Butler	5 ft 8 in (1.73 m)	Fr	Webb School	Knoxville, Tenn.
G	31	Erika Ford	5 ft 9 in (1.75 m)	So	Chattahoochee HS	Alpharetta, Ga.

Head coach

Andy Landers

Assistant coach(es)

Joni Crenshaw
Angie Johnson
Robert Mosley

Legend

- (C) Team captain
- (S) Suspended
- (I) Ineligible
- (W) Walk-on
- Injured
- Current redshirt

Roster
Last update: 2013-08-16

== Schedule ==
Date time, TV	Rank^{#}	Opponent^{#}	Result	Record	Site (attendance) city, state
Regular Season
Nov. 10, 2013*; 2:00 p.m.	No. 24	Presbyterian	W 45–30	1–0	Stegeman Coliseum (3,165); Athens, GA
Nov. 14, 2013*; 7:00 p.m.	No. 24	Mercer	W 72–41	2–0	Stegeman Coliseum (2,405); Athens, GA
Nov. 17, 2013*; 2:00 p.m.	No. 24	Ohio State	W 53–49	3–0	Stegeman Coliseum (3,627); Athens, GA
Nov. 19, 2013*; 7:00 p.m.	No. 23	Furman	W 72–48	4–0	Stegeman Coliseum (2,459); Athens, GA
Nov. 22, 2013*; 2:00 p.m.	No. 23	Georgia Tech; Clean, Old-Fashioned Hate	W 63–56	5–0	Stegeman Coliseum (3,084); Athens, GA
Nov. 26, 2013*; 7:00 p.m.	No. 22	South Carolina State	W 73–58	6–0	Stegeman Coliseum (2,272); Athens, GA
Nov. 29, 2013*; 4:15 p.m.	No. 22	vs. George Washington; Georgia State Invitational	W 80–60	7–0	GSU Sports Arena (538); Atlanta, GA
Dec. 1, 2013*; 2:30 p.m.	No. 22	at Georgia State; Georgia State Invitational	W 70–58	8–0	GSU Sports Arena (608); Atlanta, GA
Dec. 12, 2013*; 8:00 p.m.	No. 16	at Belmont	W 81–55	9–0	Curb Event Center (466); Nashville, TN
Dec. 15, 2013*; 2:00 p.m., CSS	No. 16	Kennesaw State	W 91–32	10–0	Stegeman Coliseum (2,953); Athens, GA
Dec. 17, 2013*; 7:00 p.m.	No. 16	Lipscomb	W 81–46	11–0	Stegeman Coliseum (2,269); Athens, GA
Dec. 21, 2013*; 2:00 p.m.	No. 16	at Rutgers	L 58–61	11–1	The RAC (1,557); Piscataway, NJ
Dec. 28, 2013*; 4:00 p.m., CSS	No. 19	Illinois	W 82–60	12–1	Stegeman Coliseum (3,886); Athens, GA
Jan. 2, 2014; 9:00 p.m., CSS	No. 19	at Vanderbilt	L 58–66	12–2 (0–1)	Memorial Gymnasium (3,607); Nashville, TN
Jan. 5, 2014; 4:00 p.m., SPSO	No. 19	No. 5 Tennessee	L 70–85	12–3 (0–2)	Stegeman Coliseum (6,571); Athens, GA
Jan. 9, 2014; 8:00 p.m.	No. 25	at Missouri	L 56–66	12–4 (0–3)	Mizzou Arena (1,051); Columbia, MO
Jan. 12, 2014; 2:00 p.m., SEC TV	No. 25	Texas A&M	L 44–58	12–5 (0–4)	Stegeman Coliseum (3,420); Athens, GA
Jan. 16, 2014; 7:00 p.m.		Arkansas	W 60–58	13–5 (1–4)	Stegeman Coliseum (2,458); Athens, GA
Jan. 19, 2014; 7:00 p.m.		at Florida	W 68–62	14–5 (2–4)	O'Connell Center (3,659); Gainesville, FL
Jan. 26, 2014; 3:00 p.m., CSS		at Alabama	L 66–69	14–6 (2–5)	Foster Auditorium (2,678); Tuscaloosa, AL
Jan. 30, 2014; 3:00 p.m., SPSO		No. 13 Kentucky	W 58–56	15–6 (3–5)	Stegeman Coliseum (2,509); Athens, GA
Feb. 2, 2014; 3:00 p.m., CSS		at Mississippi State	L 67–80	15–7 (3–6)	Humphrey Coliseum (2,286); Starkville, MS
Feb. 9, 2014; 2:00 p.m., CSS		Ole Miss	W 84–63	16–7 (4–6)	Stegeman Coliseum (4,250); Athens, GA
Feb. 13, 2014; 8:00 p.m., FSSW		at No. 14 Texas A&M	L 73–78 ^{OT}	16–8 (4–7)	Reed Arena (4,757); College Station, TX
Feb. 16, 2014; 1:00 p.m., ESPNU		Florida	W 67–58	17–8 (5–7)	Stegeman Coliseum (3,425); Athens, GA
Feb. 20, 2014; 7:00 p.m.		No. 19 LSU	W 71–67	18–8 (6–7)	Stegeman Coliseum (3,421); Athens, GA
Feb. 23, 2014; 3:00 p.m.		at Auburn	L 59–67	18–9 (6–8)	Auburn Arena (2,694); Auburn, AL
Feb. 27, 2014; 7:00 p.m.		at No. 4 South Carolina	L 56–67	18–10 (6–9)	Colonial Life Arena (12,000); Columbia, SC
Mar. 2, 2014; 1:00 p.m., SPSO		Mississippi State	W 77–48	19–10 (7–9)	Stegeman Coliseum (3,723); Athens, GA
2014 SEC tournament
Mar. 6, 2014; Noon, SPSO	No. (9)	vs. No. (8) Vanderbilt; Second round	W 53–43	20–10	Arena at Gwinnett Center (2,918); Duluth, GA
Mar. 7, 2014; Noon, SPSO	No. (9)	vs. No. 5 (1) South Carolina; Quarterfinal	L 48–67	20–11	Arena at Gwinnett Center (4,217); Duluth, GA
2014 NCAA tournament
Mar. 23, 2014; 5:30 p.m., ESPN	No. (8)	vs. No. (9) Saint Joseph's; First round	L 57–67	20–12	Gampel Pavilion (5,018); Storrs, CT
*Non-Conference Game. Rankings from AP poll. All times are in Eastern Time.

== Rankings ==
Ranking movement Legend: ██ Increase in ranking. ██ Decrease in ranking. NR = Not ranked. RV = Received votes.
Poll	Pre	Wk 2	Wk 3	Wk 4	Wk 5	Wk 6	Wk 7	Wk 8	Wk 9	Wk 10	Wk 11	Wk 12	Wk 13	Wk 14	Wk 15	Wk 16	Wk 17	Wk 18	Wk 19	Final
AP	24	24	23	22	19	16	16	19	19	25	NR	NR	NR	NR	NR	NR	NR	NR	NR	NR
Coaches	22	22	21	21	18	17	15	18	18	21	RV	RV	RV	RV	RV	RV	RV	NR	RV	RV

== See also ==
- 2013–14 Georgia Bulldogs basketball team
