= 2013–14 Kentucky Wildcats women's basketball team =

Intercollegiate basketball season

2013–14 Kentucky Wildcats women's basketball

NCAA tournament, Sweet Sixteen
- Conference: Southeastern Conference

Ranking
- Coaches: No. 11
- AP: No. 10
- Record: 26–9 (10–6 SEC)
- Head coach: Matthew Mitchell (7th season)
- Assistant coaches: Jeff House; Shalon Pillow; Danielle Santos
- Home arena: Memorial Coliseum

2013–14 SEC women's basketball standings
	Conf.				Overall
Team	W		L	PCT	W		L	PCT
No. 8 South Carolina	14	–	2	.875	29	–	5	.853
No. 3 Tennessee †	13	–	3	.813	29	–	6	.829
No. 15 Texas A&M	13	–	3	.813	27	–	9	.750
No. 10 Kentucky	10	–	6	.625	26	–	9	.743
Florida	8	–	8	.500	20	–	13	.606
Georgia	7	–	9	.438	20	–	12	.625
LSU	7	–	9	.438	21	–	13	.618
Vanderbilt	7	–	9	.438	18	–	13	.581
Auburn	7	–	9	.438	19	–	15	.559
Alabama	7	–	9	.438	14	–	16	.467
Arkansas	6	–	10	.375	19	–	11	.633
Missouri	6	–	10	.375	17	–	14	.548
Mississippi State	5	–	11	.313	22	–	14	.611
Ole Miss	2	–	14	.125	12	–	20	.375
† 2014 SEC tournament winner As of 10:03, 1 April 2014 (UTC); Rankings from AP poll

The 2013–14 Kentucky Wildcats women's basketball team represented University of Kentucky during the 2013–14 NCAA Division I women's basketball season. The Wildcats, led by seventh year head coach Matthew Mitchell, played their home games at the Memorial Coliseum and were members of the Southeastern Conference. They finished with a record of 26–9 overall, 10–6 in SEC play for a fourth-place finish. They lost in the 2014 SEC women's basketball tournament to Tennessee. They were invited to the 2014 NCAA Division I women's basketball tournament, where they defeated Wright State in the first round, Syracuse in the second round before losing to Baylor in the sweet sixteen.

== Roster ==
2013–14 Kentucky Wildcats women's basketball team
Players
Coaches

Pos.	#	Name	Height	Year	Previous school	Hometown
PG	0	Jennifer O'Neill	5 ft 6 in (1.68 m)	Jr	Saint Michael Academy	Bronx, NY
PG	3	Janee Thompson	5 ft 7 in (1.7 m)	So	Whitney Young	Chicago, IL
F	5	Kyvin Goodin-Rogers	6 ft 1 in (1.85 m)	Fr	Marion County	Lebanon, KY
G	10	Bernisha Pinkett	5 ft 7 in (1.7 m)	Sr	Woodson	Washington, DC
F	11	DeNesha Stallworth	6 ft 3 in (1.91 m)	RS Sr	Pinole Valley; California	Richmond, CA
F/C	12	Jelleah Sidney	6 ft 2 in (1.88 m)	Jr	Saint Michael Academy; Chipola JC	Queens Village, NY
G	13	Bria Goss	5 ft 10 in (1.78 m)	Jr	Ben Davis	Indianapolis, IN
G	15	Linnae Harper	5 ft 8 in (1.73 m)	Fr	Whitney Young	Chicago, IL
F/C	23	Samarie Walker	6 ft 1 in (1.85 m)	Sr	Chaminade-Julienne; Connecticut	West Carrollton, OH
G	25	Makayla Epps	5 ft 10 in (1.78 m)	Fr	Marion County	Lebanon, KY
F/C	31	Samantha Drake	6 ft 3 in (1.91 m)	Sr	Nelson County	Bardstown, KY
G	32	Kastine Evans	5 ft 8 in (1.73 m)	Sr	Norwich Free Academy	Salem, CT
F/C	50	Azia Bishop	6 ft 3 in (1.91 m)	Jr	Start	Toledo, OH

Head coach

Matthew Mitchell (Mississippi State)

Assistant coach(es)

Jeff House (Nazareth)
Shalon Pillow (Tennessee)
Danielle Santos (Florida)

Legend

- (C) Team captain
- (S) Suspended
- (I) Ineligible
- (W) Walk-on
- Injured
- Current redshirt

Roster
Last update: 2013-08-16

== Schedule ==
Date time, TV	Rank^{#}	Opponent^{#}	Result	Record	Site (attendance) city, state
Exhibition
Nov. 5, 2013*; 1:00 p.m.	No. 7	Eckerd College	W 83–35	–	Memorial Coliseum (2,314); Lexington, KY
Regular Season
Nov. 8, 2013*; 7:00 p.m.	No. 7	at Marist	W 75–61	1–0	McCann Field House (3,200); Poughkeepise, NY
Nov. 10, 2013*; 1:00 p.m.	No. 7	at Wagner	W 96–57	2–0	Spiro Sports Center (1,847); Staten Island, NY
Nov. 13, 2013*; 11:00 a.m.	No. 7	Georgia Southern	W 103–38	3–0	Memorial Coliseum (6,278); Lexington, KY
Nov. 17, 2013*; 2:00 p.m., UK IMG/FSN	No. 7	Central Michigan	W 96–74	4–0	Memorial Coliseum (4,813); Lexington, KY
Nov. 21, 2013*; 7:00 p.m.	No. 7	Lipscomb	W 116–49	5–0	Memorial Coliseum (5,031); Lexington, KY
Nov. 24, 2013*; 5:00 p.m., WNAB	No. 7	at Middle Tennessee	W 84–72	6–0	Murphy Center (4,822); Murfreesboro, TN
Nov. 27, 2013*; 5:00 p.m.	No. 7	Bradley	W 117–77	7–0	Memorial Coliseum (4,829); Lexington, KY
Dec. 1, 2013*; 1:00 p.m., UK IMG/FSN	No. 7	No. 4 Louisville; The Battle For The Bluegrass	W 74–69	8–0	Memorial Coliseum (7,963); Lexington, KY
Dec. 6, 2013*; 7:30 p.m.	No. 5	vs. No. 9 Baylor	W 133–130 ^{4OT}	9–0	AT&T Stadium (N/A); Arlington, TX
Dec. 12, 2013*; 7:00 p.m., FS1	No. 5	at DePaul	W 96–85	10–0	Sullivan Athletic Center (2,577); Chicago, IL
Dec. 15, 2013*; 2:00 p.m., UK IMG/FSN	No. 5	East Tennessee State	W 73–56	11–0	Memorial Coliseum (5,431); Lexington, KY
Dec. 22, 2013*; 3:00 p.m., UK IMG/FSN	No. 5	No. 2 Duke	L 61–67	11–1	Rupp Arena (23,706); Lexington, KY
Dec. 29, 2013*; 2:00 p.m.	No. 6	Grambling State	W 109–46	12–1	Memorial Coliseum (5,165); Lexington, KY
Jan. 2, 2014; 3:00 p.m.	No. 6	at Alabama	W 85–63	13–1 (1–0)	Foster Auditorium (1,639); Tuscaloosa, AL
Jan. 5, 2014; 3:00 p.m., CSS	No. 6	Florida	L 73–83	13–2 (1–1)	Memorial Coliseum (7,039); Lexington, KY
Jan. 9, 2014; 7:00 p.m.	No. 9	at No. 10 South Carolina	L 59–68	13–3 (1–2)	Colonial Life Arena (5,689); Columbia, SC
Jan. 12, 2014; 5:00 p.m., ESPNU	No. 9	Missouri	W 80–69	14–3 (2–2)	Memorial Coliseum (5,279); Lexington, KY
Jan. 19, 2014; 2:00 p.m., SEC TV	No. 10	at Auburn	W 73–71	15–3 (3–2)	Auburn Arena (3,129); Auburn, AL
Jan. 23, 2014; 7:00 p.m.	No. 9	Alabama	L 55–57	15–4 (3–3)	Memorial Coliseum (4,722); Lexington, KY
Jan. 26, 2014; 1:00 p.m., SPSO	No. 9	Arkansas	W 68–58	16–4 (4–3)	Memorial Coliseum (5,396); Lexington, KY
Jan. 30, 2014; 9:00 p.m., SPSO	No. 13	at Georgia	L 56–58	16–5 (4–4)	Stegeman Coliseum (2,509); Athens, GA
Feb. 2, 2014; 12:00 p.m., SPSO	No. 13	No. 14 LSU	W 63–56	17–5 (5–4)	Memorial Coliseum (6,333); Lexington, KY
Feb. 9, 2014; 12:00 p.m., CSS	No. 15	at Florida	L 80–86	17–6 (5–5)	O'Connell Center (2,759); Gainesville, FL
Feb. 13, 2014; 7:00 p.m., SPSO	No. 18	Ole Miss	W 108–78	18–6 (6–5)	Memorial Coliseum (6,530); Lexington, KY
Feb. 16, 2014; 1:00 p.m., ESPN	No. 18	at No. 8 Tennessee; Rivalry	W 75–71	19–6 (7–5)	Thompson–Boling Arena (15,664); Knoxville, TN
Feb. 20, 2014; 7:00 p.m., UK IMG/FSN	No. 15	No. 4 South Carolina	L 58–81	19–7 (7–6)	Memorial Coliseum (5,958); Lexington, KY
Feb. 23, 2014; 2:00 p.m., ESPN2	No. 15	at No. 16 Texas A&M	W 83–74	20–7 (8–6)	Reed Arena (7,343); College Station, TX
Feb. 27, 2014; 8:00 p.m.	No. 12	at Mississippi State	W 81–74 ^{OT}	21–7 (9–6)	Humphrey Coliseum (2,871); Starkville, MS
Mar. 2, 2014; 4:00 p.m., ESPN2	No. 12	Vanderbilt	W 65–63	22–7 (10–6)	Memorial Coliseum (6,551); Lexington, KY
SEC tournament
Mar. 7, 2014; 2:30 p.m., SPSO	No. 12 (4)	vs. No. (5) Florida; Quarterfinal	W 75–70	23–7	Arena at Gwinnett Center (4,217); Duluth, GA
Mar. 8, 2014; Noon, ESPNU	No. 12 (4)	vs. No. 5 (1) South Carolina; Semifinal	W 68–58	24–7	Arena at Gwinnett Center (6,306); Duluth, GA
Mar. 9, 2014; 3:30 p.m., ESPN	No. 12 (4)	vs. No. 6 (2) Tennessee; Championship game / Rivalry	L 70–71	24–8	Arena at Gwinnett Center (6,544); Duluth, GA
NCAA women's tournament
Mar. 22, 2014*; 11:00 a.m., ESPN2	No. 10 (3)	No. (14) Wright State; First Round	W 106–60	25–8	Memorial Coliseum (N/A); Lexington, KY
Mar. 24, 2014*; 6:25 p.m., ESPN2	No. 10 (3)	No. (6) Syracuse; Second Round	W 64–59	26–8	Memorial Coliseum (4,661); Lexington, KY
Mar. 29, 2014*; 12:00 p.m., ESPN	No. 10 (3)	vs. No. 5 (2) Baylor; Sweet Sixteen	L 72–90	26–9	Edmund P. Joyce Center (N/A); South Bend, IN
*Non-conference game. ^{#}Rankings from AP Poll. (#) Tournament seedings in parentheses. All times are in Eastern Time.

== Rankings ==
Ranking movement Legend: ██ Increase in ranking. ██ Decrease in ranking. NR = Not ranked. RV = Received votes.
Poll	Pre	Wk 2	Wk 3	Wk 4	Wk 5	Wk 6	Wk 7	Wk 8	Wk 9	Wk 10	Wk 11	Wk 12	Wk 13	Wk 14	Wk 15	Wk 16	Wk 17	Wk 18	Wk 19	Final
AP	7	7	7	7	5	5	5	6	6	9	10	9	13	15	18	15	12	12	10	10
Coaches	8	8	7	7	6	6	6	6	6	10	12	8	12	13	18	15	15	13	11	11

== See also ==
2013–14 Kentucky Wildcats men's basketball team
