= 2013–14 Auburn Tigers women's basketball team =

Intercollegiate basketball season

2013–14 Auburn Tigers women's basketball

WNIT, Third Round
- Conference: Southeastern Conference
- Record: 19–15 (7–9 SEC)
- Head coach: Terri Williams-Flournoy (2nd season)
- Assistant coaches: Ty Evans; Caroline McCombs; Adrian Walters
- Home arena: Auburn Arena

2013–14 SEC women's basketball standings
	Conf.				Overall
Team	W		L	PCT	W		L	PCT
No. 8 South Carolina	14	–	2	.875	29	–	5	.853
No. 3 Tennessee †	13	–	3	.813	29	–	6	.829
No. 15 Texas A&M	13	–	3	.813	27	–	9	.750
No. 10 Kentucky	10	–	6	.625	26	–	9	.743
Florida	8	–	8	.500	20	–	13	.606
Georgia	7	–	9	.438	20	–	12	.625
LSU	7	–	9	.438	21	–	13	.618
Vanderbilt	7	–	9	.438	18	–	13	.581
Auburn	7	–	9	.438	19	–	15	.559
Alabama	7	–	9	.438	14	–	16	.467
Arkansas	6	–	10	.375	19	–	11	.633
Missouri	6	–	10	.375	17	–	14	.548
Mississippi State	5	–	11	.313	22	–	14	.611
Ole Miss	2	–	14	.125	12	–	20	.375
† 2014 SEC tournament winner As of 10:03, 1 April 2014 (UTC); Rankings from AP poll

The 2013–14 Auburn Tigers women's basketball team represented Auburn University during the 2013–14 NCAA Division I women's basketball season. The Tigers, led by second-year head coach Terri Williams-Flournoy, played their home games at Auburn Arena and were members of the Southeastern Conference.

== Roster ==
#	Name	Height	Position	Class	Hometown
00	Hasina Muhammad	6'1"	G	Junior	Memphis, TN
1	Meagan Tucker	5'8"	G	Freshman	Covington, GA
3	Allina Starr	5'10"	G	Freshman	Minneapolis, MN
10	Brandy Montgomery	5'10"	G	Freshman	Port St. Lucie, FL
12	Keonna Farmer	6'1"	G/F	Freshman	Birmingham, AL
13	Katie Frerking	6'1"	G/F	Freshman	Johns Creek, GA
21	Melinda Brimfield	6'0"	F	Junior	Norway, SC
22	Kiani Parker	5'9"	G	Junior	Fort Walton Beach, FL
32	Tyrese Tanner	6'1"	G/F	Senior	Birmingham, AL
34	Peyton Davis	6'5"	C	Senior	Pinson, AL
35	Cabriana Capers	6'1"	F	Sophomore	Bolingbrook, IL
40	Ndeye Dieng	5'10"	G	Freshman	Dakar, Senegal
44	Tra'Cee Tanner	6'3"	F/C	Sophomore	Birmingham, AL

== Schedule ==
Date time, TV	Rank^{#}	Opponent^{#}	Result	Record	Site (attendance) city, state
Regular season
Nov. 9, 2013*; 6:00 p.m.		Georgia Southern	W 69–59	1–0	Auburn Arena (2,982); Auburn, AL
Nov. 13, 2013*; 6:00 p.m.		Jacksonville State	W 66–49	2–0	Auburn Arena (1,713); Auburn, AL
Nov. 16, 2013*; 5:00 p.m.		at Temple	L 74–78	2–1	McGonigle Hall (758); Philadelphia, PA
Nov. 19, 2013*; 7:00 p.m.		at Alabama A&M	W 77–49	3–1	Elmore Gymnasium (1,362); Huntsville, AL
Nov. 24, 2013*; 2:00 p.m.		at Chattanooga	L 52–80	3–2	McKenzie Arena (2,069); Chattanooga, AL
Nov. 29, 2013*; 2:00 p.m.		vs. Ball State; South Point Shootout semifinals	W 67–51	4–2	South Point Arena (N/A); Paradise, NV
Nov. 30, 2013*; 9:30 p.m.		vs. No. 23 Iowa State; South Point Shootout championship	L 58–67	4–3	South Point Arena (413); Paradise, NV
Dec. 3, 2013*; 6:00 p.m.		Tulane	W 62–52	5–3	Auburn Arena (1,611); Auburn, AL
Dec. 6, 2013*; 6:00 p.m.		St. John's	W 69–55	6–3	Auburn Arena (1,734); Auburn, AL
Dec. 15, 2013*; 6:00 p.m.		Florida A&M	W 92–55	7–3	Auburn Arena (1,845); Auburn, AL
Dec. 18, 2013*; 6:00 p.m.		Presbyterian	W 64–27	8–3	Auburn Arena (1,532); Auburn, AL
Dec. 21, 2013*; 2:00 p.m.		vs. UCLA; Subway Classic	W 66–60	9–3	Williams Arena (350); Minneapolis, MN
Dec. 22, 2013*; 2:00 p.m.		at Minnesota; Subway Classic	L 54–67	9–4	Williams Arena (3,139); Minneapolis, MN
Jan. 5, 2014; 2:00 p.m.		at Mississippi State	W 82–74	10–4 (1–0)	Humphrey Coliseum (2,269); Starkville, MS
Jan. 9, 2014; 6:00 p.m.		Vanderbilt	L 65–74	10–5 (1–1)	Auburn Arena (2,319); Auburn, AL
Jan. 12, 2014; 1:30 p.m., SPSO		No. 10 South Carolina	L 66–72	10–6 (1–2)	Auburn Arena (2,453); Auburn, AL
Jan. 16, 2014; 7:00 p.m.		at Alabama	W 61–39	11–6 (2–2)	Foster Auditorium (2,453); Tuscaloosa, AL
Jan. 19. 2014; 1:00 p.m., SEC TV		No. 10 Kentucky	L 71–73	11–7 (2–3)	Auburn Arena (3,129); Auburn, AL
Jan. 23, 2014; 7:00 p.m.		at No. 15 LSU	L 60–71	11–8 (2–4)	Maravich Center (2,855); Baton Rouge, LA
Jan. 26, 2014; 2:00 p.m., ESPNU		at Florida	L 69–87	11–9 (2–5)	O'Connell Center (3,114); Gainesville, FL
Jan. 30, 2014; 6:00 p.m.		No. 17 Texas A&M	L 54–71	11–10 (2–6)	Auburn Arena (2,780); Auburn, AL
Feb. 2, 2014; 2:00 p.m.		at Arkansas	W 56–48	12–10 (3–6)	Bud Walton Arena (1,387); Fayetteville, AR
Feb. 9, 2014; 2:00 p.m.		Mississippi State	W 51–43	13–10 (4–6)	Auburn Arena (3,278); Auburn, AL
Feb. 13, 2014; 6:00 p.m., CSS		at No. 16 Vanderbilt	W 66–62	14–10 (5–6)	Memorial Gymnasium (3,023); Nashville, TN
Feb. 16, 2014; 2:00 p.m., SPSO		Missouri	L 58–68	14–11 (5–7)	Auburn Arena (2,241); Auburn, AL
Feb. 20, 2014; 6:00 p.m., CSS		at No. 10 Tennessee	L 63–93	14–12 (5–8)	Thompson–Boling Arena (10,111); Knoxville, TN
Feb. 23, 2014; 6:00 p.m.		Georgia	W 67–59	15–12 (6–8)	Auburn Arena (2,694); Auburn, AL
Feb. 27, 2014; 6:00 p.m.		Alabama	W 70–65 ^{2OT}	16–12 (7–8)	Auburn Arena (3,649); Auburn, AL
Mar. 2, 2014; 2:00 p.m.		Ole Miss	L 71–73 ^{OT}	16–13 (7–9)	Auburn Arena (935); Auburn, AL
2014 SEC women's basketball tournament
Mar. 6, 2014; 7:30 p.m., SPSO	No. (6)	vs. No. (14) Ole Miss; Second round	W 70–54	17–13	Arena at Gwinnett Center (3,152); Duluth, GA
Mar. 7, 2014; 7:30 p.m., SPSO	No. (6)	vs. No. 15 (3) Texas A&M; Second round	L 54–86	17–14	Arena at Gwinnett Center (3,152); Duluth, GA
2014 Women's National Invitation Tournament
Mar. 20, 2014*; 6:00 p.m., SPSO		Furman; First round	W 78–64	18–14	Auburn Arena (N/A); Auburn, AL
Mar. 24, 2014*; 6:00 p.m., SPSO		Old Dominion; Second round	W 82–59	19–14	Auburn Arena (N/A); Auburn, AL
Mar. 27, 2014; 7:00 p.m., SPSO		at Mississippi State; Third round	L 54–59	19–15	Humphrey Coliseum (N/A); Starkville, MS
*Non-conference game. ^{#}Rankings from AP Poll. (#) Tournament seedings in parentheses. All times are in Central Time.

== See also ==
- 2013–14 Auburn Tigers men's basketball team
