= 2013–14 LSU Lady Tigers basketball team =

Intercollegiate basketball season

2013–14 LSU Lady Tigers basketball

Barclays Center Women's Invitational Champions NCAA Women's Tournament, Sweet Sixteen
- Conference: Southeastern Conference
- Record: 21–13 (7–9 SEC)
- Head coach: Nikki Fargas (3rd season)
- Assistant coaches: Tasha Butts; Angel Elderkin; Tony Perotti
- Home arena: Pete Maravich Assembly Center

2013–14 SEC women's basketball standings
	Conf.				Overall
Team	W		L	PCT	W		L	PCT
No. 8 South Carolina	14	–	2	.875	29	–	5	.853
No. 3 Tennessee †	13	–	3	.813	29	–	6	.829
No. 15 Texas A&M	13	–	3	.813	27	–	9	.750
No. 10 Kentucky	10	–	6	.625	26	–	9	.743
Florida	8	–	8	.500	20	–	13	.606
Georgia	7	–	9	.438	20	–	12	.625
LSU	7	–	9	.438	21	–	13	.618
Vanderbilt	7	–	9	.438	18	–	13	.581
Auburn	7	–	9	.438	19	–	15	.559
Alabama	7	–	9	.438	14	–	16	.467
Arkansas	6	–	10	.375	19	–	11	.633
Missouri	6	–	10	.375	17	–	14	.548
Mississippi State	5	–	11	.313	22	–	14	.611
Ole Miss	2	–	14	.125	12	–	20	.375
† 2014 SEC tournament winner As of 10:03, 1 April 2014 (UTC); Rankings from AP poll

The 2013–14 LSU Lady Tigers basketball team represented Louisiana State University during the 2013–2014 college basketball season. The team's head coach is Nikki Fargas, who was in her third season at LSU. They played their home games at Pete Maravich Assembly Center as members of the Southeastern Conference.

== Roster ==
2013–14 LSU Tigers women's basketball team
Players
Coaches

Pos.	#	Name	Height	Year	Previous school	Hometown
C	1	Derreyal Youngblood	6 ft 4 in (1.93 m)	So	John Curtis HS	Harvey, La.
G	3	Akilah Bethel	6 ft 0 in (1.83 m)	Jr	Academy of Holy Cross/West Virginia	Baltimore, Md.
G	4	Anne Pedersen	6 ft 1 in (1.85 m)	So	The Rock School / FL	Copenhagen, Denmark
G	5	Jeanne Kenney	5 ft 8 in (1.73 m)	Sr	St. Michael HS	Baton Rouge, La.
G	10	Jasmine Rhodes	5 ft 10 in (1.78 m)	Fr	Faith Academy	Mobile, Ala.
G	11	Raigyne Moncrief	5 ft 10 in (1.78 m)	Fr	American Heritage HS	Fort Lauderdale, Fla.
G	13	Rina Hill	5 ft 7 in (1.7 m)	Fr	IMG Academy / FL	Nagoya-Shi, Japan
F	21	Shanece McKinney	6 ft 4 in (1.93 m)	Sr	LeFlore HS	Mobile, Ala.
G	24	DaShawn Harden	5 ft 9 in (1.75 m)	Jr	St. Thomas Aquinas HS/Johnson County (KS) CC	Olathe, Kan.
F	31	Ann Jones	6 ft 3 in (1.91 m)	Jr	Liberty Magnet School/Memphis	Jackson, Tenn.
G	32	Danielle Ballard	5 ft 9 in (1.75 m)	So	Memphis Central HS	Memphis, Tenn.
F	42	Sheila Boykin	6 ft 2 in (1.88 m)	Jr	Long Beach Poly HS	Los Angeles, Calif.
F	55	Theresa Plaisance	6 ft 5 in (1.96 m)	Sr	Vandebilt Catholic HS	New Orleans, La.

Head coach

Nikki Fargas

Assistant coach(es)

Tasha Butts
Angel Elderkin
Tony Perotti

Legend

- (C) Team captain
- (S) Suspended
- (I) Ineligible
- (W) Walk-on
- Injured
- Current redshirt

Roster
Last update: 2013-08-16

== Schedule and results ==
Date time, TV	Rank^{#}	Opponent^{#}	Result	Record	Site (attendance) city, state
Exhibition
Oct. 30, 2013*; 7:00 p.m.	No. 17	Tennessee Temple	W 95–24	–	Maravich Center (N/A); Baton Rouge, LA
Nov. 2, 2013*; 2:00 p.m.	No. 17	Mississippi College	W 104–30	–	Maravich Center (N/A); Baton Rouge, LA
Regular Season
Nov. 8, 2013*; 7:00 p.m.	No. 15	Stephen F. Austin; Preseason WNIT	W 86–58	1–0	Maravich Center (2,290); Baton Rouge, LA
Nov. 10, 2013*; 2:00 p.m.	No. 15	Saint Joseph's; Preseason WNIT	W 80–64	2–0	Maravich Center (2,623); Baton Rouge, LA
Nov. 14, 2013*; 6:00 p.m.	No. 14	at No. 5 Louisville; Preseason WNIT	L 67–88	2–1	KFC Yum! Center (8,099); Louisville, KY
Nov. 20, 2013*; 7:00 p.m.	No. 15	Hampton	W 73–54	3–1	Maravich Center (2,459); Baton Rouge, LA
Nov. 23, 2013*; 1:00 p.m.	No. 15	at Louisiana Tech	W 81–69	4–1	Thomas Assembly Center (2,767); Ruston, LA
Nov. 29, 2013*; 12:00 p.m.	No. 15	vs. Rutgers; Barclays Women's Invitational semifinals	W 69–65	5–1	Barclays Center (1,194); Brooklyn, NY
Nov. 30, 2013*; 9:00 p.m.	No. 15	vs. Michigan; Barclays Women's Invitational championship	W 64–62	6–1	Barclays Center (1,012); Brooklyn, NY
Dec. 3, 2013*; 11:30 a.m.	No. 13	Indiana State	W 83–66	7–1	Maravich Center (6,105); Baton Rouge, LA
Dec. 15, 2013*; 2:00 p.m.	No. 13	at Arkansas-Little Rock	W 58–51	8–1	Jack Stephens Center (2,635); Little Rock, AR
Dec. 17, 2013*; 7:00 p.m., CST	No. 12	Florida Gulf Coast	W 69–46	9–1	Maravich Center (2,190); Baton Rouge, LA
Dec. 20, 2013*; 6:00 p.m.	No. 12	at NC State	L 79–89	9–2	Reynolds Coliseum (2,025); Raleigh, NC
Dec. 30, 2013*; 8:00 p.m., CST	No. 16	Jackson State	W 72–45	10–2	Maravich Center (2,801); Baton Rouge, LA
Jan. 2, 2014; 6:00 p.m., CSS/CST	No. 16	at No. 5 Tennessee	W 80–77	11–2 (1–0)	Thompson–Boling Arena (14,437); Knoxville, TN
Jan. 5, 2014*; 2:00 p.m.	No. 12	at Tulane	W 63–35	12–2	Devlin Fieldhouse (2,844); New Orleans, LA
Jan. 9, 2014; 6:00 p.m., CST	No. 12	Texas A&M	L 48–52	12–3 (1–1)	Maravich Center (2,786); Baton Rouge, LA
Jan. 12, 2014; 12:00 p.m., ESPNU	No. 12	Florida	W 82–68	13–3 (2–1)	Maravich Center (3,672); Baton Rouge, LA
Jan. 16, 2014; 7:00 p.m.	No. 14	at Missouri	W 87–68	14–3 (3–1)	Mizzou Arena (2,005); Columbia, MO
Jan. 19, 2014; 1:00 p.m., FSN/SPSO	No. 14	at No. 24 Vanderbilt	L 70–79	14–4 (3–2)	Memorial Gymnasium (6,020); Nashville, TN
Jan. 23, 2014; 7:00 p.m.	No. 15	Auburn	W 71–60	15–4 (4–2)	Maravich Center (2,855); Baton Rouge, LA
Jan. 26, 2014; 1:00 p.m., SEC TV	No. 15	at Ole Miss	W 66–56	16–4 (5–2)	Tad Smith Coliseum (737); Oxford, MS
Jan. 30, 2014; 7:00 p.m., CST	No. 14	Mississippi State	W 65–56	17–4 (6–2)	Maravich Center (2,587); Baton Rouge, LA
Feb. 2, 2014; 11:00 a.m., FSN/SPSO	No. 13	at No. 14 Kentucky	L 56–63	17–5 (6–3)	Memorial Coliseum (6,333); Lexington, KY
Feb. 6, 2014; 7:00 p.m.	No. 16	Missouri	W 75–58	18–5 (7–3)	Maravich Center (2,663); Baton Rouge, LA
Feb. 9, 2014; 1:30 p.m., FSN/SPSO	No. 16	at No. 19 Texas A&M	L 67–72	18–6 (7–4)	Reed Arena (5,926); College Station, TX
Feb. 16, 2014; 2:30 p.m., ESPN2	No. 19	No. 5 South Carolina	L 57–73	18–7 (7–5)	Maravich Center (4,275); Baton Rouge, LA
Feb. 20, 2014; 6:00 p.m.	No. 19	at Georgia	L 67–71	18–8 (7–6)	Stegeman Coliseum (3,421); Athens, GA
Feb. 23, 2014; 1:00 p.m., CST	No. 19	Arkansas	L 53–57	18–9 (7–7)	Maravich Center (3,155); Baton Rouge, LA
Feb. 27, 2014; 8:00 p.m., CSS/CST		No. 10 Tennessee	L 67–72	18–10 (7–8)	Maravich Center (3,374); Baton Rouge, LA
Mar. 2, 2014; 1:00 p.m., SEC TV		at Alabama	L 60–78	18–11 (7–9)	Foster Auditorium (2,536); Tuscaloosa, AL
2014 SEC Tournament
Mar. 6, 2014; 5:00 p.m., SPSO	No. (10)	vs. No. (7) Alabama; Second round	W 78–65	19–11	Arena at Gwinnett Center (3,152); Duluth, GA
Mar. 7, 2014; 5:00 p.m., SPSO	No. (10)	vs. No. 6 (2) Tennessee; Quarterfinal	L 65–77	19–12	Arena at Gwinnett Center (5,232); Duluth, GA
2014 NCAA Tournament
Mar. 22, 2014*; 11:50 a.m., ESPN2	No. (7)	No. (10) Georgia Tech; First round	W 98-78	20-12	Pete-Maravich Assembly Center (2,833); Baton Rouge, LA
Mar. 25, 2014*; 8:45 p.m., ESPN2	No. (7)	No. (2) West Virginia; Second round	W 76-67	21-12	Pete-Maravich Assembly Center (2,186); Baton Rouge, LA
Mar. 30, 2014*; 1:30 p.m., ESPN2	No. (7)	No. (3) Louisville; Sweet Sixteen	L 47-73	21-13	KFC Yum! Center (11,097); Louisville, KY
*Non-conference game. ^{#}Rankings from AP Poll. (#) Tournament seedings in parentheses. All times are in Central Time.

== Rankings ==
Ranking movement Legend: ██ Increase in ranking. ██ Decrease in ranking. NR = Not ranked. RV = Received votes.
Poll	Pre	Wk 2	Wk 3	Wk 4	Wk 5	Wk 6	Wk 7	Wk 8	Wk 9	Wk 10	Wk 11	Wk 12	Wk 13	Wk 14	Wk 15	Wk 16	Wk 17	Wk 18	Wk 19	Final
AP	15	14	15	15	13	13	12	16	16	12	14	15	14	16	19	19				
Coaches	17	16	18	17	14	13	12	16	16	13	14	14	14	14	17	18				

== See also ==
- 2013–14 LSU Tigers basketball team
