= 2013–14 Florida Gators women's basketball team =

Intercollegiate basketball season

2013–14 Florida Gators women's basketball

Junkanoo Jam, 3rd Place NCAA tournament, Second round
- Conference: Southeastern Conference
- Record: 20–13 (8–8 SEC)
- Head coach: Amanda Butler (7th season)
- Assistant coaches: David Lowery (7th season); Murriel Page (4th season); Angela Crosby (1st season)
- Home arena: O'Connell Center

2013–14 SEC women's basketball standings
	Conf.				Overall
Team	W		L	PCT	W		L	PCT
No. 8 South Carolina	14	–	2	.875	29	–	5	.853
No. 3 Tennessee †	13	–	3	.813	29	–	6	.829
No. 15 Texas A&M	13	–	3	.813	27	–	9	.750
No. 10 Kentucky	10	–	6	.625	26	–	9	.743
Florida	8	–	8	.500	20	–	13	.606
Georgia	7	–	9	.438	20	–	12	.625
LSU	7	–	9	.438	21	–	13	.618
Vanderbilt	7	–	9	.438	18	–	13	.581
Auburn	7	–	9	.438	19	–	15	.559
Alabama	7	–	9	.438	14	–	16	.467
Arkansas	6	–	10	.375	19	–	11	.633
Missouri	6	–	10	.375	17	–	14	.548
Mississippi State	5	–	11	.313	22	–	14	.611
Ole Miss	2	–	14	.125	12	–	20	.375
† 2014 SEC tournament winner As of 10:03, 1 April 2014 (UTC); Rankings from AP poll

The 2013–14 Florida Gators women's basketball team represented the University of Florida in the sport of basketball during the 2013–14 women's college basketball season. The Gators competed in Division I of the National Collegiate Athletic Association (NCAA) and the Southeastern Conference (SEC). They were led by head coach Amanda Butler, and played their home games in the O'Connell Center on the university's Gainesville, Florida campus.

In the postseason, the Gators advanced to the Quarterfinal round of the SEC tournament, where they were defeated by the Kentucky Wildcats 70–75, their only loss to Kentucky of the season. The Gators were then selected to compete in the NCAA tournament, and advanced to the second round after defeating the Dayton Flyers 83–69. In the second round, the Gators were ousted by the Penn State Lady Lions 61–83.

== Previous season ==
In the 2012–13 season, the Gators finished with a record of 22–15 overall, 6–10 in the SEC, and lost in the Semifinal round of the WNIT to Drexel.

== Roster ==
2013–14 Florida Gators women's basketball team
Players
Coaches

Pos.	#	Name	Height	Year	Hometown
G	5	Antoinette Bannister	5 ft 10 in (1.78 m)	So	Jacksonville, Florida
G	10	Jaterra Bonds	5 ft 7 in (1.7 m)	Sr	Gainesville, Florida
C	15	Viktorija Dimaite	6 ft 4 in (1.93 m)	RS So	Panevėžys, Lithuania
G	22	Kayla Lewis	6 ft 0 in (1.83 m)	RS Jr	Decatur, Georgia
F	25	Christin Mercer (redshirt)	6 ft 0 in (1.83 m)	So	Douglasville, Georgia
G	3	January Miller	5 ft 8 in (1.73 m)	So	Orlando, Florida
G	4	Carlie Needles	5 ft 6 in (1.68 m)	RS So	Highlands Ranch, Colorado
G	13	Cassie Peoples	5 ft 6 in (1.68 m)	RS So	San Antonio, Texas
F	31	Lily Svete	6 ft 2 in (1.88 m)	RS Sr	Granger, Indiana
G/F	1	Ronni Williams	6 ft 0 in (1.83 m)	Fr	Daytona Beach, Florida

Head coach

- Amanda Butler (7th year)

Assistant coach(es)

- David Lowery (7th year)
- Murriel Page (4th year)
- Angela Crosby (1st year)

Legend

- (C) Team captain
- (S) Suspended
- (I) Ineligible
- (W) Walk-on
- Injured
- Current redshirt

Roster
Last update: 2014-02-03

=== Coaches ===
Name	Position	College	Graduating year
Amanda Butler	Head coach	University of Florida	1995
Angela Crosby	Assistant coach	Appalachian State University	1995
David Lowery	Assistant coach	Mississippi State University	2000
Murriel Page	Assistant coach	University of Florida	1998
Serena Wilson	Director of Basketball Operations	University of Florida	2008
Shellie Greenman	Program Coordinator	Emory and Henry College	1988
Travis Kwok	Video Coordinator	University of Florida	2008
Tyler Stuart	Strength & Conditioning Coordinator	Anderson University	2007
John "JB" Barrett	Athletic trainer	Mississippi State University	1997
Judy Traveis	Academic Advisor	University of Florida	1993

== Schedule and results ==
Date time, TV	Rank^{#}	Opponent^{#}	Result	Record	Site (attendance) city, state
Regular season (Non-conference play)
Nov. 8, 2013*; 5:15 p.m.		Bethune-Cookman	W 93–65	1–0	O'Connell Center (1,179); Gainesville, FL
Nov. 10, 2013*; 2:00 p.m.		UNF	W 88–77	2–0	O'Connell Center (1,413); Gainesville, FL
Nov. 14, 2013*; 7:00 p.m.		at Virginia Tech	L 59–71	2–1	Cassell Coliseum (1,100); Blacksburg, VA
Nov. 17, 2013*; 2:00 p.m.		at Kennesaw State	W 83–62	3–1	KSU Convocation Center (916); Kennesaw, GA
Nov. 21, 2013*; 5:00 p.m.		Florida State	L 68–76	3–2	O'Connell Center (1,602); Gainesville, FL
Nov. 26, 2013*; 7:00 p.m.		St. John's	W 72–68	4–2	O'Connell Center (702); Gainesville, FL
Nov. 29, 2013*; 1:00 p.m.		vs. Illinois State; Junkanoo Jam Semifinal	L 64–68	4–3	St. George's High School Gymnasium (255); Freeport, Bahamas
Nov. 30, 2013*; 1:45 p.m.		vs. Oregon State; Junkanoo Jam 3rd Place Game	W 73–70	5–3	St. George's High School Gymnasium (257); Freeport, Bahamas
Dec. 4, 2013*; 8:00 p.m.		at Troy	W 104–74	6–3	Trojan Arena (765); Troy, AL
Dec. 17, 2013*; 6:00 p.m.		Saint Francis (PA)	W 105–71	7–3	O'Connell Center (1,008); Gainesville, FL
Dec. 20, 2013*; 7:00 p.m.		Tennessee State; Gator Holiday Classic	W 86–56	8–3	O'Connell Center (1,152); Gainesville, FL
Dec. 21, 2013*; 7:00 p.m.		FIU; Gator Holiday Classic	W 90–74	9–3	O'Connell Center (1,091); Gainesville, FL
Dec. 28, 2013*; 2:00 p.m., Sun		Georgetown	W 67–65 ^{OT}	10–3	O'Connell Center (1,629); Gainesville, FL
Regular season (Conference play)
Jan. 2, 2014; 7:00 p.m., Sun/FSFL		Mississippi State	W 82–72	11–3 (1–0)	O'Connell Center (1,224); Gainesville, FL
Jan. 5, 2014; 3:00 p.m., CSS/CST		at No. 6 Kentucky	W 83–73	12–3 (2–0)	Memorial Coliseum (7,039); Lexington, KY
Jan. 9, 2014; 7:00 p.m.		Arkansas	W 59–52	13–3 (3–0)	O'Connell Center (1,369); Gainesville, FL
Jan. 12, 2014; 1:00 p.m., ESPNU		at No. 12 LSU	L 68–82	13–4 (3–1)	Pete Maravich Assembly Center (3,672); Baton Rouge, LA
Jan. 19, 2014; 1:00 p.m., CSS/CST		Georgia	L 62–68	13–5 (3–2)	O'Connell Center (3,659); Gainesville, FL
Jan. 23, 2014; 6:30 p.m., SPSO/FSFL		at No. 11 Tennessee	L 61–89	13–6 (3–3)	Thompson–Boling Arena (10,541); Knoxville, TN
Jan. 26, 2014; 3:00 p.m., ESPNU		Auburn	W 87–69	14–6 (4–3)	O'Connell Center (3,114); Gainesville, FL
Jan. 30, 2014; 7:00 p.m., FSFL		Alabama	W 75–67	15–6 (5–3)	O'Connell Center (1,431); Gainesville, FL
Feb. 2, 2014; 2:00 p.m., SEC TV		at Ole Miss	W 81–60	16–6 (6–3)	Tad Smith Coliseum (532); Oxford, MS
Feb. 6, 2014; 8:00 p.m.		at Arkansas	L 49–55	16–7 (6–4)	Bud Walton Arena (1,208); Fayetteville, AR
Feb. 9, 2014; Noon, CSS/CST		No. 15 Kentucky	W 86–80	17–7 (7–4)	O'Connell Center (2,759); Gainesville, FL
Feb. 16, 2014; 1:00 p.m., ESPNU		at Georgia	L 58–67	17–8 (7–5)	Stegeman Coliseum (3,425); Athens, GA
Feb. 20, 2014; 7:00 p.m., Sun		Missouri	L 76–81	17–9 (7–6)	O'Connell Center (1,161); Gainesville, FL
Feb. 23, 2014; 1:00 p.m., SPSO/Sun		at No. 4 South Carolina	L 55–69	17–10 (7–7)	Colonial Life Arena (10,547); Columbia, SC
Feb. 27, 2014; 8:00 p.m.		at Vanderbilt	W 73–68	18–10 (8–7)	Memorial Gymnasium (3,338); Nashville, TN
Mar. 2, 2014; 1:00 p.m., CSS/CST		No. 17 Texas A&M	L 72–83	18–11 (8–8)	O'Connell Center (2,779); Gainesville, FL
SEC tournament
Mar. 6, 2014; 2:30 p.m., SPSO/Sun	No. (5)	vs. (13) Mississippi State; Second round	W 71–67	19–11	Arena at Gwinnett Center (2,918); Duluth, GA
Mar. 7, 2014; 2:30 p.m., SPSO/Sun	No. (5)	vs. No. 12 (4) Kentucky; Quarterfinal	L 70–75	19–12	Arena at Gwinnett Center (4,271); Duluth, GA
NCAA tournament
Mar. 23, 2014; 3:00 p.m., ESPN	No. (11)	vs. (6) Dayton; First round	W 83–69	20–12	Bryce Jordan Center (3,925); University Park, PA
Mar. 25, 2014; 7:00 p.m., ESPN2	No. (11)	vs. No. 14 (3) Penn State; Second round	L 61–83	20–13	Bryce Jordan Center (3,500); University Park, PA
*Non-Conference Game. Rankings from AP poll. All times are in Eastern Time. ( ) Tournament seedings in parentheses.

== Rankings ==
Ranking movement Legend: ██ Increase in ranking. ██ Decrease in ranking. NR = Not ranked. RV = Received votes.
Poll	Pre Nov. 4	Wk 2 Nov. 11	Wk 3 Nov. 18	Wk 4 Nov. 25	Wk 5 Dec. 2	Wk 6 Dec. 9	Wk 7 Dec. 16	Wk 8 Dec. 23	Wk 9 Dec. 30	Wk 10 Jan. 6	Wk 11 Jan. 13	Wk 12 Jan. 20	Wk 13 Jan. 27	Wk 14 Feb. 3	Wk 15 Feb. 10	Wk 16 Feb. 17	Wk 17 Feb. 24	Wk 18 Mar. 3	Wk 19 Mar. 10	Wk 20 Mar. 17	Final
AP	NR	NR	NR	NR	NR	NR	NR	NR	NR	RV	RV	NR	NR	NR	RV	RV	NR	NR	NR	NR	
Coaches	RV	RV	NR	NR	NR	NR	NR	NR	NR	RV	RV	NR	NR	NR	RV	NR	NR	NR	NR		
