= 2013–14 Vanderbilt Commodores women's basketball team =

Intercollegiate basketball season

2013–14 Vanderbilt Commodores women's basketball

NCAA Women's Tournament, first round
- Conference: Southeastern Conference
- Record: 18–13 (7–9 SEC)
- Head coach: Melanie Balcomb (12th season)
- Assistant coaches: Tom Garrick; Kim Rosamond; Ashley Earley
- Home arena: Memorial Gymnasium

2013–14 SEC women's basketball standings
	Conf.				Overall
Team	W		L	PCT	W		L	PCT
No. 8 South Carolina	14	–	2	.875	29	–	5	.853
No. 3 Tennessee †	13	–	3	.813	29	–	6	.829
No. 15 Texas A&M	13	–	3	.813	27	–	9	.750
No. 10 Kentucky	10	–	6	.625	26	–	9	.743
Florida	8	–	8	.500	20	–	13	.606
Georgia	7	–	9	.438	20	–	12	.625
LSU	7	–	9	.438	21	–	13	.618
Vanderbilt	7	–	9	.438	18	–	13	.581
Auburn	7	–	9	.438	19	–	15	.559
Alabama	7	–	9	.438	14	–	16	.467
Arkansas	6	–	10	.375	19	–	11	.633
Missouri	6	–	10	.375	17	–	14	.548
Mississippi State	5	–	11	.313	22	–	14	.611
Ole Miss	2	–	14	.125	12	–	20	.375
† 2014 SEC tournament winner As of 10:03, 1 April 2014 (UTC); Rankings from AP poll

The 2013–14 Vanderbilt Commodores women's basketball team represented Vanderbilt University in the 2013–14 college basketball season. The team's head coach was Melanie Balcomb, in her twelfth season at Vanderbilt. The team played their home games at Memorial Gymnasium in Nashville, Tennessee, as a member of the Southeastern Conference.

== Roster ==
2013–14 Vanderbilt Commodores women's basketball team
Players
Coaches

Pos.	#	Name	Height	Year	Previous school	Hometown
G	1	Rebekah Dahlman	5 ft 9 in (1.75 m)	Fr	Braham Area	Braham, Minn.
F	3	Heather Bowe	6 ft 0 in (1.83 m)	So	Regis	Eau Claire, Wis.
G	5	Kady Schrann	5 ft 9 in (1.75 m)	Jr	York Catholic	York, Pa.
G	10	Christina Foggie	5 ft 9 in (1.75 m)	Sr	Lenape Regional	Mount Laurel, N.J.
G	11	Jasmine Lister	5 ft 4 in (1.63 m)	Sr	Santiago	Corona, Calif.
G	15	Jasmine Jenkins	5 ft 8 in (1.73 m)	So	East Hall	Gainesville, Ga.
F	22	Marqu'es Webb	6 ft 1 in (1.85 m)	Fr	Hoover	Hoover, Ala.
G	23	Kylee Smith	5 ft 11 in (1.8 m)	Fr	Alpharetta	Alpharetta, Ga.
F	24	Kristen Gaffney	6 ft 1 in (1.85 m)	RS Fr	Green Hope	Cary, N.C.
G	25	Morgan Batey	5 ft 10 in (1.78 m)	So	Pace Academy	Atlanta, Ga.
C	35	Kendall Shaw	6 ft 4 in (1.93 m)	So	Barbers Hill	Mont Belvieu, Texas
F	44	Rayte'a Long	6 ft 0 in (1.83 m)	Jr	Chaminade	Dayton, Ohio

Head coach

Melanie Balcomb

Assistant coach(es)

Tom Garrick
Kim Rosamond
Ashley Earley

Legend

- (C) Team captain
- (S) Suspended
- (I) Ineligible
- (W) Walk-on
- Injured
- Current redshirt

Roster
Last update: 2014-10-10

== Schedule ==
Date time, TV	Rank^{#}	Opponent^{#}	Result	Record	Site (attendance) city, state
Exhibition
Nov. 2, 2013*; 2:00 p.m.		North Alabama	W 103–50	–	Memorial Gymnasium (3,005); Nashville, TN
Non-conference regular season
Nov. 8, 2013*; 7:00 p.m.		Appalachian State	W 96–53	1–0	Memorial Gymnasium (2,746); Nashville, TN
Nov. 11, 2013*; 7:00 p.m.		WKU	W 85–60	2–0	Memorial Gymnasium (2,830); Nashville, TN
Nov. 14, 2013*; 7:00 p.m.		Delaware State	W 73–67	3–0	Memorial Gymnasium (2,830); Nashville, TN
Nov. 17, 2013*; 2:00 p.m.		Marquette	L 77–82	3–1	Memorial Gymnasium (4,229); Nashville, TN
Nov. 21, 2013*; 5:30 p.m.		at No. 2 Duke	L 69–88	3–2	Cameron Indoor Stadium (3,938); Durham, NC
Nov. 24, 2013*; 2:00 p.m.		Dayton	W 82–52	4–2	Memorial Gymnasium (2,902); Nashville, TN
Nov. 29, 2013*; 4:00 p.m.		Elon; Thanksgiving Tournament semifinals	W 88–66	5–2	Memorial Gymnasium (4,446); Nashville, TN
Nov. 30, 2013*; 6:30 p.m.		Wisconsin; Thanksgiving Tournament championship	W 81–69	6–2	Memorial Gymnasium (4,446); Nashville, TN
Dec. 3, 2013*; 7:00 p.m.		East Tennessee State	W 92–71	7–2	Memorial Gymnasium (2,984); Nashville, TN
Dec. 15, 2013*; 1:00 p.m.		at Hartford	W 65–56	8–2	Chase Arena (1,210); Hartford, CT
Dec. 18, 2013*; 6:00 p.m.		at James Madison	W 89–85 ^{OT}	9–2	JMU Convocation Center (2,260); Harrisonburg, VA
Dec. 21, 2013*; 11:30 a.m.		UNC Asheville	W 83–57	10–2	Memorial Gymnasium (3,201); Nashville, TN
Dec. 30, 2013*; 7:00 p.m.		at UAB	W 87–76	11–2	Bartow Arena (711); Birmingham, AL
SEC regular season
Jan. 2, 2014; 8:00 p.m., CSS		No. 19 Georgia	W 66–58	12–2 (1–0)	Memorial Gymnasium (3,607); Nashville, TN
Jan. 5, 2014; 12:00 p.m., ESPNU		at No. 13 South Carolina	L 66–76	12–3 (1–1)	Colonial Life Arena (4,810); Columbia, SC
Jan. 9, 2014; 6:00 p.m.		at Auburn	W 74–65	13–3 (2–1)	Auburn Arena (2,319); Auburn, AL
Jan. 12, 2014; 4:00 p.m., ESPN		No. 8 Tennessee; Rivalry	W 74–63	14–3 (3–1)	Memorial Gymnasium (9,412); Nashville, TN
Jan. 16, 2014; 6:00 p.m.	No. 24	at Ole Miss	W 80–74	15–3 (4–1)	Tad Smith Coliseum (354); Oxford, MS
Jan. 19, 2014; 1:00 p.m., SPSO	No. 24	No. 14 LSU	W 79–70	16–3 (5–1)	Memorial Gymnasium (6,020); Nashville, TN
Jan. 26, 2014; 1:00 p.m., ESPN2	No. 16	No. 10 South Carolina	L 57–61	16–4 (5–2)	Memorial Gymnasium (3,554); Nashville, TN
Jan. 30, 2014; 7:00 p.m.	No. 16	at Missouri	L 54–59	16–5 (5–3)	Mizzou Arena (1,238); Columbia, MO
Feb. 2, 2014; 1:00 p.m., FSSO	No. 16	No. 17 Texas A&M	W 71–69	17–5 (6–3)	Memorial Gymnasium (3,483); Nashville, TN
Feb. 10, 2014; 4:00 p.m., ESPN2	No. 16	No. 8 Tennessee; Rivalry	L 53–81	17–6 (6–4)	Thompson–Boling Arena (11,384); Knoxville, TN
Feb. 13, 2014; 6:00 p.m., CSS	No. 16	Auburn	L 62–68	17–7 (6–5)	Memorial Gymnasium (3,023); Nashville, TN
Feb. 16, 2014; 1:00 p.m., SEC TV	No. 16	at Mississippi State	L 62–64	17–8 (6–6)	Humphrey Coliseum (2,354); Starkville, MS
Feb. 20, 2014; 7:00 p.m.		at Arkansas	W 56–50	18–8 (7–6)	Bud Walton Arena (1,400); Fayetteville, AR
Feb. 23, 2014; 7:00 p.m., CSS		Alabama	L 62–66	18–9 (7–7)	Memorial Gymnasium (3,479); Nashville, TN
Feb. 27, 2014; 7:00 p.m.		Florida	L 68–73	18–10 (7–8)	Memorial Gymnasium (3,338); Nashville, TN
Mar. 2, 2014; 3:00 p.m., ESPN2		at No. 12 Kentucky	L 63–65	18–11 (7–9)	Memorial Coliseum (6,551); Lexington, KY
2014 SEC tournament
Mar. 6, 2014; 11:00 a.m., SPSO	(8)	vs. (9) Georgia; Second round	L 43–53	18–12	Arena at Gwinnett Center (2,918); Duluth, GA
2014 NCAA women's tournament
Mar. 22, 2014*; 10:00 a.m., ESPN2		vs. Arizona State; First Round	L 61–69	18–13	Savage Arena (N/A); Toledo, OH
*Non-conference game. Rankings from AP poll. All times are in Central Time.

== Rankings ==
Ranking movement Legend: ██ Increase in ranking. ██ Decrease in ranking. NR = Not ranked. RV = Received votes.
Poll	Pre	Wk 2	Wk 3	Wk 4	Wk 5	Wk 6	Wk 7	Wk 8	Wk 9	Wk 10	Wk 11	Wk 12	Wk 13	Wk 14	Wk 15	Wk 16	Wk 17	Wk 18	Wk 19	Final
AP	RV	RV	RV	NR	NR	NR	NR	NR	NR	RV	24	16	16	18	16	RV	NR			
Coaches	RV	25	RV	RV	RV	RV	RV	RV	RV	RV	25	19	18	19	20	25				

== See also ==
- 2013–14 Vanderbilt Commodores men's basketball team
