= 2014 SEC women's basketball tournament =

- Classification: Division I
- Season: 2013–14
- Teams: 14
- Site: Arena at Gwinnett Center; Duluth, Georgia
- Champions: Tennessee (17th title)
- Winning coach: Holly Warlick (1st title)
- MVP: Isabelle Harrison (Tennessee)
- Attendance: 30,467
- Television: SportSouth, Fox Sports South, ESPNU, ESPN

2013–14 SEC women's basketball standings
| | Conf. | | | | Overall |
| Team | W | | L | PCT | W | | L | PCT |
|---|---|---|---|---|---|---|---|---|
| No. 8 South Carolina | 14 | – | 2 | .875 | 29 | – | 5 | .853 |
| No. 3 Tennessee † | 13 | – | 3 | .813 | 29 | – | 6 | .829 |
| No. 15 Texas A&M | 13 | – | 3 | .813 | 27 | – | 9 | .750 |
| No. 10 Kentucky | 10 | – | 6 | .625 | 26 | – | 9 | .743 |
| Florida | 8 | – | 8 | .500 | 20 | – | 13 | .606 |
| Georgia | 7 | – | 9 | .438 | 20 | – | 12 | .625 |
| LSU | 7 | – | 9 | .438 | 21 | – | 13 | .618 |
| Vanderbilt | 7 | – | 9 | .438 | 18 | – | 13 | .581 |
| Auburn | 7 | – | 9 | .438 | 19 | – | 15 | .559 |
| Alabama | 7 | – | 9 | .438 | 14 | – | 16 | .467 |
| Arkansas | 6 | – | 10 | .375 | 19 | – | 11 | .633 |
| Missouri | 6 | – | 10 | .375 | 17 | – | 14 | .548 |
| Mississippi State | 5 | – | 11 | .313 | 22 | – | 14 | .611 |
| Ole Miss | 2 | – | 14 | .125 | 12 | – | 20 | .375 |
† 2014 SEC tournament winner As of 10:03, 1 April 2014 (UTC); Rankings from AP poll

The 2014 SEC women's basketball tournament was the postseason women's basketball tournament for the Southeastern Conference (SEC), beginning on March 5, 2014, and ending on March 9, 2014, in Duluth, Georgia, at the Arena at Gwinnett Center. While it determined the SEC's representative in the NCAA tournament, it did not determine the official SEC champion; the conference has awarded its official championship solely on the basis of regular-season record since the 1985–86 season.

== Format ==
Although the SEC expanded to 14 members with the addition of Missouri and Texas A&M in July 2012, this was the first SEC women's tournament to feature 14 teams. Ole Miss did not participate in the 2013 tournament; it self-imposed a postseason ban for the 2012–13 season after revelations of potential major NCAA rules violations.

The teams seeded 1–4 received a double-bye to the quarterfinals, and the teams seeded 5–10 received a single-bye to the second round. The remaining four teams played in the first round.

== Seeds ==
2014 SEC women's basketball tournament seeds and results
| Seed | School | Conf. | Over. | Tiebreaker |
| 1 | ‡South Carolina | 14–2 | 27–4 | |
| 2 | †Tennessee | 13–3 | 27–5 | 1–0 vs. Texas A&M |
| 3 | †Texas A&M | 13–3 | 24–8 | 0–1 vs. Tennessee |
| 4 | †Kentucky | 10–6 | 24–8 | |
| 5 | #Florida | 8–8 | 19–12 | |
| 6 | #Auburn | 7–9 | 17–14 | 4–2 vs. Alabama, Vanderbilt, Georgia, and LSU |
| 7 | #Alabama | 7–9 | 14–16 | 3–2 vs. Auburn, Vanderbilt, Georgia, and LSU; 1–0 vs. Vanderbilt |
| 8 | #Vanderbilt | 7–9 | 18–12 | 3–2 vs. Auburn, Alabama, Georgia, and LSU; 0–1 vs. Alabama |
| 9 | #Georgia | 7–9 | 20–11 | 1–3 vs. Auburn, Alabama, Vanderbilt, and LSU; 1–0 vs. LSU |
| 10 | #LSU | 7–9 | 19–12 | 1–3 vs. Auburn, Alabama, Vanderbilt, and Georgia; 0–1 vs. Georgia |
| 11 | Arkansas | 6–10 | 19–11 | 2–0 vs. Missouri |
| 12 | Missouri | 6–10 | 17–13 | 0–2 vs. Arkansas |
| 13 | Mississippi State | 5–11 | 19–13 | |
| 14 | Ole Miss | 2–14 | 12–20 | |
‡ – SEC regular season champions, and tournament No. 1 seed. † – Received a double-bye in the conference tournament. # – Received a single-bye in the conference tournament. Overall records include all games played in the SEC Tournament.

== Schedule ==
| Game | Time* | Matchup^{#} | Television | Attendance |
First Round – Wednesday, March 5
| 1 | 6:00 pm | #12 Missouri vs. #13 Mississippi State | FSSO/SPSO | 2,044 |
| 2 | 8:30 pm | #11 Arkansas vs. #14 Ole Miss | FSSO/SPSO | 2,044 |
Second Round – Thursday, March 6
| 3 | Noon | #9 Georgia vs. #8 Vanderbilt | SPSO | 2,918 |
| 4 | 2:30 pm | #5 Florida vs. #13 Mississippi State | SPSO | 2,918 |
| 5 | 6:00 pm | #7 Alabama vs. #10 LSU | SPSO | 3,152 |
| 6 | 8:30 pm | #6 Auburn vs. #14 Ole Miss | SPSO | 3,152 |
Quarterfinals – Friday, March 7
| 7 | Noon | #1 South Carolina vs. #9 Georgia | SPSO | 4,217 |
| 8 | 2:30 pm | #4 Kentucky vs. #5 Florida | SPSO | 4,217 |
| 9 | 6:00 pm | #2 Tennessee vs. #10 LSU | SPSO | 5,232 |
| 10 | 8:30 pm | #3 Texas A&M vs. #6 Auburn | SPSO | 5,232 |
Semifinals – Saturday, March 8
| 11 | Noon | #1 South Carolina vs. #4 Kentucky | ESPNU | 6,306 |
| 12 | 2:30 pm | #2 Tennessee vs. #3 Texas A&M | ESPNU | 6,306 |
Championship – Sunday, March 9
| 13 | 3:30 pm | #4 Kentucky vs. #2 Tennessee | ESPN | 6,544 |
*Game Times in ET. # – Rankings denote tournament seed

SPSO games air across the SEC Region on FSN affiliates, including FSSW, and FSMW. The games rotate between the main channel and Plus affiliates. The games are also simulcast outside SEC territories on ESPN3. Next year the majority of the games will move to SEC Network.

=== Bracket ===
First round Wednesday, March 5
12 | Missouri | 70
13 | Mississippi State | 73
11 | Arkansas | 62
14 | Ole Miss | 63

Second round Thursday, March 6
9 | Georgia | 53
8 | Vanderbilt | 43
13 | Mississippi State | 67
5 | Florida | 71
10 | LSU | 78
7 | Alabama | 65
14 | Ole Miss | 54
6 | Auburn | 70

Quarterfinals; Friday, March 7
9 | Georgia | 48
1 | South Carolina | 67
5 | Florida | 70
4 | Kentucky | 75
10 | LSU | 65
2 | Tennessee | 77
6 | Auburn | 54
3 | Texas A&M | 86

Semifinals; Saturday, March 8
1 | South Carolina | 58
4 | Kentucky | 68
2 | Tennessee | 86
3 | Texas A&M | 77

Championship Game; Sunday, March 9
4 | Kentucky | 70
2 | Tennessee | 71

^{OT} denotes overtime game
