= Melanie Balcomb =

American basketball coach

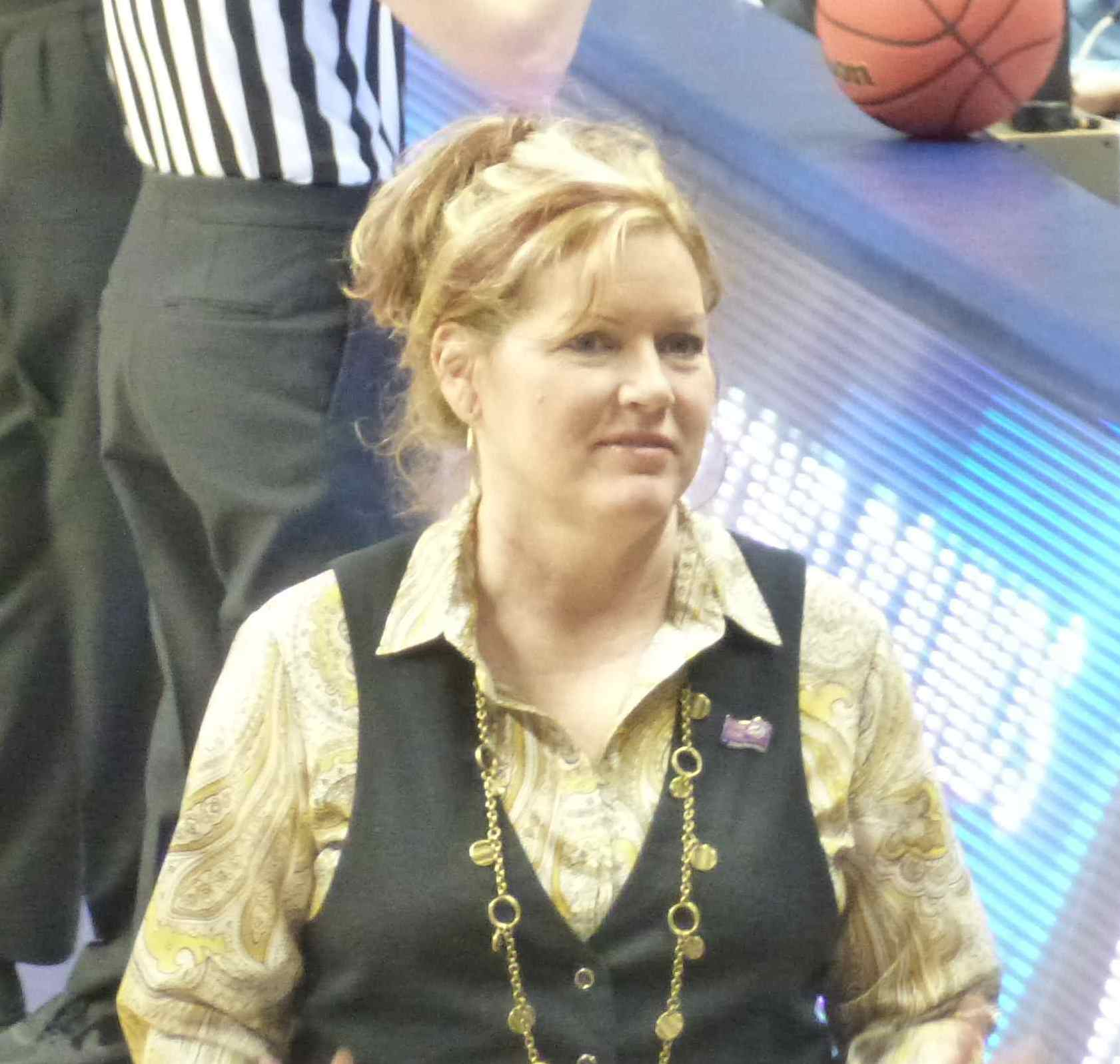

Biographical details
- Born: September 24, 1962 (age 64); Trenton, New Jersey, U.S.

Playing career
- 1985–1989: Trenton State

Coaching career (HC unless noted)
- 1989–1990: Ohio (Asst.)
- 1990–1993: Providence (Asst.)
- 1993–1995: Ashland
- 1995–2002: Xavier
- 2002–2016: Vanderbilt
- 2017: Texas Tech (Asst.)
- 2019–2021: Purdue (Assoc.)
- 2021–2022: Ohio Dominican (Asst.)
- 2022–2023: Ohio Dominican

Head coaching record
- Overall: 472–245 (.658)

Melanie Balcomb (born September 24, 1962) is an American basketball coach who is the head coach of the Ohio Dominican Panthers women's basketball team. She was previously the head coach for the Vanderbilt women's basketball team from 2002–2016.

== Career ==
Balcomb attended Hightstown High School, in Hightstown, New Jersey, where she starred as a point guard for the girls' varsity basketball team from 1976 to 1980. She attended Trenton State College (now The College of New Jersey), where she set school records for career assists and steals, and she scored over 1,000 points in her collegiate basketball career.

Before arriving at Vanderbilt, Balcomb was head coach at Xavier for seven years, leading the Lady Musketeers to a school-record 31 wins and an Elite Eight appearance in 2001.

Balcomb resigned from Vanderbilt at the end of 2016 season and was subsequently hired by the South Carolina women's basketball team to direct offensive analytics.

== Head coaching record ==
Record table
Season	Team	Overall	Conference	Standing	Postseason
Ashland (Great Lakes Valley) (1993–1995)
1993–94	Ashland	18–9			
1994–95	Ashland	10–17			
Ashland:		28–26 (.519)			
Xavier (Atlantic 10 Conference) (1995–2002)
1995–96	Xavier	15–13	7–9	8th	
1996–97	Xavier	10–17	5–11	8th	
1997–98	Xavier	17–12	11–5	T-2nd	WNIT 1st Round
1998–99	Xavier	24–9	11–5	T-4th	NCAA 2nd Round
1999-00	Xavier	26–5	13–3	3rd	NCAA 1st Round
2000–01	Xavier	31–3	15–1	1st	NCAA Elite Eight
2001–02	Xavier	12–19	5–11	10th	
Xavier:		135–78 (.634)	67–45 (.598)		
Vanderbilt (SEC) (2002–2016)
2002–03	Vanderbilt	22–10	9–5	T-5th	NCAA 2nd Round
2003–04	Vanderbilt	26–8	8–6	4th	NCAA Sweet Sixteen
2004–05	Vanderbilt	24–8	10–4	3rd	NCAA Sweet Sixteen
2005–06	Vanderbilt	21–11	8–6	T-5th	NCAA 2nd Round
2006–07	Vanderbilt	28–6	10–4	T-3rd	NCAA 2nd Round
2007–08	Vanderbilt	25–9	11–3	3rd	NCAA Sweet Sixteen
2008–09	Vanderbilt	26–9	10–4	T-2nd	NCAA Sweet Sixteen
2009–10	Vanderbilt	23–11	9–7	T-3rd	NCAA 2nd Round
2010–11	Vanderbilt	20–12	10–6	T-3rd	NCAA 1st Round
2011–12	Vanderbilt	23–10	9–7	7th	NCAA 2nd Round
2012–13	Vanderbilt	21–12	9–7	7th	NCAA 2nd Round
2013–14	Vanderbilt	18–13	7–9	T-6th	NCAA 1st Round
2014–15	Vanderbilt	15–16	5–11	T-11th	
2015–16	Vanderbilt	18–14	5–11	11th	
Vanderbilt:		309–142 (.685)	119–82 (.592)		
Ohio Dominican (Great Midwest Athletic Conference) (2022–2023)
2022–23	Ohio Dominican	6–21	3–17	13th	
Ohio Dominican:		6–21 (.222)	3–17 (.150)		
Total:		478–266 (.642)			
National champion Postseason invitational champion Conference regular season champion Conference regular season and conference tournament champion Division regular season champion Division regular season and conference tournament champion Conference tournament champion
