= 2013–14 Southeastern Conference women's basketball season =

2013–14 SEC Women's Basketball Season
- League: NCAA Division I
- Sport: Basketball
- Teams: 14
- TV partner(s): ESPN2, SEC Network, FSN

WNBA Draft

Regular Season
- 2014 SEC Champions: South Carolina

Tournament

Basketball seasons
- ← 2012–13 2014–15 →

The 2013–14 SEC women's basketball season began with practices in October 2013, followed by the start of the 2013–14 NCAA Division I women's basketball season in November. Conference play started in early January 2014 and concluded in March, followed by the 2014 SEC women's basketball tournament at the Arena at Gwinnett Center in Duluth, Georgia.

== Standings ==
2013–14 SEC women's basketball standings
	Conf.				Overall
Team	W		L	PCT	W		L	PCT
No. 8 South Carolina	14	–	2	.875	29	–	5	.853
No. 3 Tennessee †	13	–	3	.813	29	–	6	.829
No. 15 Texas A&M	13	–	3	.813	27	–	9	.750
No. 10 Kentucky	10	–	6	.625	26	–	9	.743
Florida	8	–	8	.500	20	–	13	.606
Georgia	7	–	9	.438	20	–	12	.625
LSU	7	–	9	.438	21	–	13	.618
Vanderbilt	7	–	9	.438	18	–	13	.581
Auburn	7	–	9	.438	19	–	15	.559
Alabama	7	–	9	.438	14	–	16	.467
Arkansas	6	–	10	.375	19	–	11	.633
Missouri	6	–	10	.375	17	–	14	.548
Mississippi State	5	–	11	.313	22	–	14	.611
Ole Miss	2	–	14	.125	12	–	20	.375
† 2014 SEC tournament winner As of 10:03, 1 April 2014 (UTC); Rankings from AP poll
