= 2013–14 South Carolina Gamecocks women's basketball team =

Intercollegiate basketball season

2013–14 South Carolina Gamecocks women's basketball

SEC Regular Season Champion

NCAA tournament, Sweet Sixteen
- Conference: Southeastern Conference

Ranking
- Coaches: No. 8
- AP: No. 8
- Record: 29–5 (14–2 SEC)
- Head coach: Dawn Staley (6th season)
- Assistant coaches: Lisa Boyer; Nikki McCray; Darius Taylor
- Home arena: Colonial Life Arena

2013–14 SEC women's basketball standings
	Conf.				Overall
Team	W		L	PCT	W		L	PCT
No. 8 South Carolina	14	–	2	.875	29	–	5	.853
No. 3 Tennessee †	13	–	3	.813	29	–	6	.829
No. 15 Texas A&M	13	–	3	.813	27	–	9	.750
No. 10 Kentucky	10	–	6	.625	26	–	9	.743
Florida	8	–	8	.500	20	–	13	.606
Georgia	7	–	9	.438	20	–	12	.625
LSU	7	–	9	.438	21	–	13	.618
Vanderbilt	7	–	9	.438	18	–	13	.581
Auburn	7	–	9	.438	19	–	15	.559
Alabama	7	–	9	.438	14	–	16	.467
Arkansas	6	–	10	.375	19	–	11	.633
Missouri	6	–	10	.375	17	–	14	.548
Mississippi State	5	–	11	.313	22	–	14	.611
Ole Miss	2	–	14	.125	12	–	20	.375
† 2014 SEC tournament winner As of 10:03, 1 April 2014 (UTC); Rankings from AP poll

The 2013–14 South Carolina Gamecocks women's basketball team represented the University of South Carolina during the 2013–14 NCAA Division I women's basketball season. The Gamecocks, led by sixth year head coach Dawn Staley, played their home games at the Colonial Life Arena and competed as members of the Southeastern Conference. The Gamecocks won their first SEC regular season championship with a 14–2 league record and entered the NCAA Tournament as a No. 1 seed for the first time. Tiffany Mitchell was named SEC Player of the Year, averaging 15.5 points per game, and freshman center Alaina Coates earned SEC Freshman of the Year honors.

== Roster ==
2013–14 South Carolina Gamecocks women's basketball team
Players
Coaches

Pos.	#	Name	Height	Year	Previous school	Hometown
G	0	India Farmer	6 ft 0 in (1.83 m)	Fr	North Myrtle Beach	North Myrtle Beach, S.C.
G	2	Olivia Gaines	5 ft 7 in (1.7 m)	Jr	Louisburg College (N.C.)	Chester, S.C.
G	5	Khadijah Sessions	5 ft 8 in (1.73 m)	So	Myrtle Beach	Myrtle Beach, S.C.
C	12	Wilka Montout	6 ft 3 in (1.91 m)	Sr	Northeastern Oklahoma A&M	Cayenne, French Guiana
G	15	Tiffany Davis	5 ft 7 in (1.7 m)	RS Fr	Westbury Christian	Houston, Texas
G	21	LeAnna Morrison	5 ft 5 in (1.65 m)	Jr	Charlotte	Monck's Corner, S.C.
G	23	Tina Roy	5 ft 11 in (1.8 m)	RS So	Kaplan	Kaplan, La.
F	24	Aleighsa Welch	6 ft 0 in (1.83 m)	Jr	Goose Creek	Goose Creek, S.C.
G	25	Tiffany Mitchell	5 ft 9 in (1.75 m)	So	Providence Day	Charlotte, N.C.
G	31	Asia Dozier	6 ft 0 in (1.83 m)	So	Spring Valley	Columbia, S.C.
F	33	Elem Ibiam	6 ft 4 in (1.93 m)	Jr	Fayette County	Fayetteville, Ga.
C	41	Alaina Coates	6 ft 4 in (1.93 m)	Fr	Dutch Fork	Irmo, S.C.

Head coach

Dawn Staley

Assistant coach(es)

Lisa Boyer
Nikki McCray
Darius Taylor

Legend

- (C) Team captain
- (S) Suspended
- (I) Ineligible
- (W) Walk-on
- Injured
- Current redshirt

Roster
Last update: 2013-08-16

== Schedule ==
Date time, TV	Rank^{#}	Opponent^{#}	Result	Record	Site (attendance) city, state
Exhibition
Nov. 3, 2013*; 7:00 p.m.	No. 22	North Greenville	W 96–35	–	Colonial Life Arena (N/A); Columbia, SC
Regular Season
Nov. 9, 2013*; 7:00 p.m.	No. 22	Charleston Southern	W 99–29	1–0	Colonial Life Arena (5,120); Columbia, SC
Nov. 10, 2013*; 2:00 p.m.	No. 22	Louisiana Tech	W 68–45	2–0	Colonial Life Arena (5,078); Columbia, SC
Nov. 13, 2013*; 8:00 p.m., FSSO/FSCR	No. 21	College of Charleston	W 81–54	3–0	Colonial Life Arena (4,882); Columbia, SC
Nov. 17, 2013*; 3:00 p.m.	No. 21	Seton Hall	W 88–67	4–0	Colonial Life Arena (4,765); Columbia, SC
Nov. 21, 2013*; 7:00 p.m.	No. 19	at Clemson	W 68–43	5–0	Littlejohn Coliseum (715); Clemson, SC
Nov. 23, 2013*; 4:00 p.m.	No. 19	at San Diego State	W 88–54	6–0	Viejas Arena (642); San Diego, CA
Nov. 25, 2013*; 8:00 p.m., P12N	No. 17	at USC	W 70–50	7–0	Galen Center (897); Los Angeles, CA
Dec. 2, 2013*; 7:00 p.m., FSSO/FSCR	No. 12	North Carolina Central	W 79–27	8–0	Colonial Life Arena (4,347); Columbia, SC
Dec. 8, 2013*; 2:00 p.m.	No. 12	at Charlotte	W 76–61	9–0	Dale F. Halton Arena (1,357); Charlotte, NC
Dec. 18, 2013*; 7:00 p.m.	No. 10	vs. No. 14 North Carolina; Carolinas Challenge	L 66–74	9–1	Myrtle Beach Convention Center (4,137); Myrtle Beach, SC
Dec. 20, 2013*; 12:00 p.m.	No. 10	Winthrop	W 69–61	10–1	Colonial Life Arena (5,431); Columbia, SC
Dec. 22, 2013*; 2:00 p.m., FSSO/FSCR	No. 10	South Carolina State	W 70–26	11–1	Colonial Life Arena (5,937); Columbia, SC
Dec. 29, 2013*; 2:00 p.m., FSSO/FSCR	No. 13	Savannah State	W 82–40	12–1	Colonial Life Arena (4,824); Columbia, SC
Jan. 2, 2014; 8:00 p.m.	No. 13	at Arkansas	W 55–51	13–1 (1–0)	Bud Walton Arena (2,215); Fayetteville, AR
Jan. 5, 2014; 1:00 p.m., ESPNU	No. 13	Vanderbilt	W 76–66	14–1 (2–0)	Colonial Life Arena (4,810); Columbia, SC
Jan. 9, 2014; 7:00 p.m.	No. 10	No. 9 Kentucky	W 68–59	15–1 (3–0)	Colonial Life Arena (5,689); Columbia, SC
Jan. 12, 2014; 2:30 p.m., SPSO	No. 10	at Auburn	W 72–66	16–1 (4–0)	Auburn Arena (2,453); Auburn, AL
Jan. 16, 2014; 8:00 p.m.	No. 8	at No. 25 Texas A&M	L 65–67 ^{OT}	16–2 (4–1)	Reed Arena (5,778); College Station, TX
Jan. 19, 2014; 3:00 p.m.	No. 8	Alabama	W 77–51	17–2 (5–1)	Colonial Life Arena (7,740); Columbia, SC
Jan. 26, 2014; 2:00 p.m., ESPN2	No. 10	at No. 16 Vanderbilt	W 61–57	18–2 (6–1)	Memorial Gymnasium (3,554); Nashville, TN
Jan. 30, 2014; 7:00 p.m.	No. 7	Ole Miss	W 99–70	19–2 (7–1)	Colonial Life Arena (5,344); Columbia, SC
Feb. 2, 2014; 3:00 p.m.	No. 7	Missouri	W 78–62	20–2 (8–1)	Colonial Life Arena (7,828); Columbia, SC
Feb. 6, 2014; 8:00 p.m.	No. 6	at Mississippi State	W 71–64	21–2 (9–1)	Humphrey Coliseum (2,323); Starkville, MS
Feb. 9, 2014; 8:00 p.m., SEC TV/WKTC	No. 6	Arkansas	W 67–49	22–2 (10–1)	Colonial Life Arena (7,545); Columbia, SC
Feb. 16, 2014; 3:30 p.m., ESPN2	No. 5	at No. 19 LSU	W 73–57	23–2 (11–1)	Maravich Center (4,275); Baton Rouge, LA
Feb. 20, 2014; 7:00 p.m., UK IMG/FSSO	No. 4	at No. 15 Kentucky	W 81–58	24–2 (12–1)	Memorial Coliseum (5,958); Lexington, KY
Feb. 23, 2014; 1:00 p.m., SPSO	No. 4	Florida	W 69–55	25–2 (13–1)	Colonial Life Arena (10,547); Columbia, SC
Feb. 27, 2014; 7:00 p.m., SPSO	No. 4	Georgia	W 67–56	26–2 (14–1)	Colonial Life Arena (12,000); Columbia, SC
Mar. 2, 2014; 2:30 p.m., ESPNU	No. 4	at No. 10 Tennessee	L 61–73	26–3 (14–2)	Thompson–Boling Arena (14,072); Knoxville, TN
SEC tournament
Mar. 7, 2014; 12:00 p.m., SPSO	No. 5 (1)	vs. No. (9) Georgia; Quarterfinal	W 67–48	27–3	Arena at Gwinnett Center (4,217); Duluth, GA
Mar. 8, 2014; 12:00 p.m., ESPNU	No. 5 (1)	vs. No. 12 (4) Kentucky; Semifinal	L 58–68	27–4	Arena at Gwinnett Center (6,306); Duluth, GA
NCAA women's tournament
Mar. 23, 2014*; 5:30 p.m., ESPN2	No. 8 (1)	vs. No. (16) Cal State Northridge; First Round	W 73–58	28–4	Alaska Airlines Arena (1,365); Seattle, WA
Mar. 25, 2014*; 9:40 p.m., ESPN2	No. 8 (1)	vs. No. (9) Oregon State; Second Round	W 78–69	29–4	Alaska Airlines Arena (1,664); Seattle, WA
Mar. 30, 2014*; 7:00 p.m., ESPN2	No. 8 (1)	vs. No. 12 (4) North Carolina; Sweet Sixteen	L 58-65	29-5	Maples Pavilion; Stanford, CA
*Non-conference game. ^{#}Rankings from AP Poll. (#) Tournament seedings in parentheses. All times are in Eastern Time.

== Rankings ==
Ranking movement Legend: ██ Increase in ranking. ██ Decrease in ranking. NR = Not ranked. RV = Received votes.
Poll	Pre	Wk 2	Wk 3	Wk 4	Wk 5	Wk 6	Wk 7	Wk 8	Wk 9	Wk 10	Wk 11	Wk 12	Wk 13	Wk 14	Wk 15	Wk 16	Wk 17	Wk 18	Wk 19	Final
AP	22	22	19	17	12	10	10	13	13	10	8	10	7	6	5	4	4	5	8	8
Coaches	21	17	14	13	10	10	10	12	12	11	8	11	8	7	6	6	5T	7	8	8

== See also ==
2013–14 South Carolina Gamecocks men's basketball team
