= Foster Auditorium =

Multipurpose facility at the University of Alabama

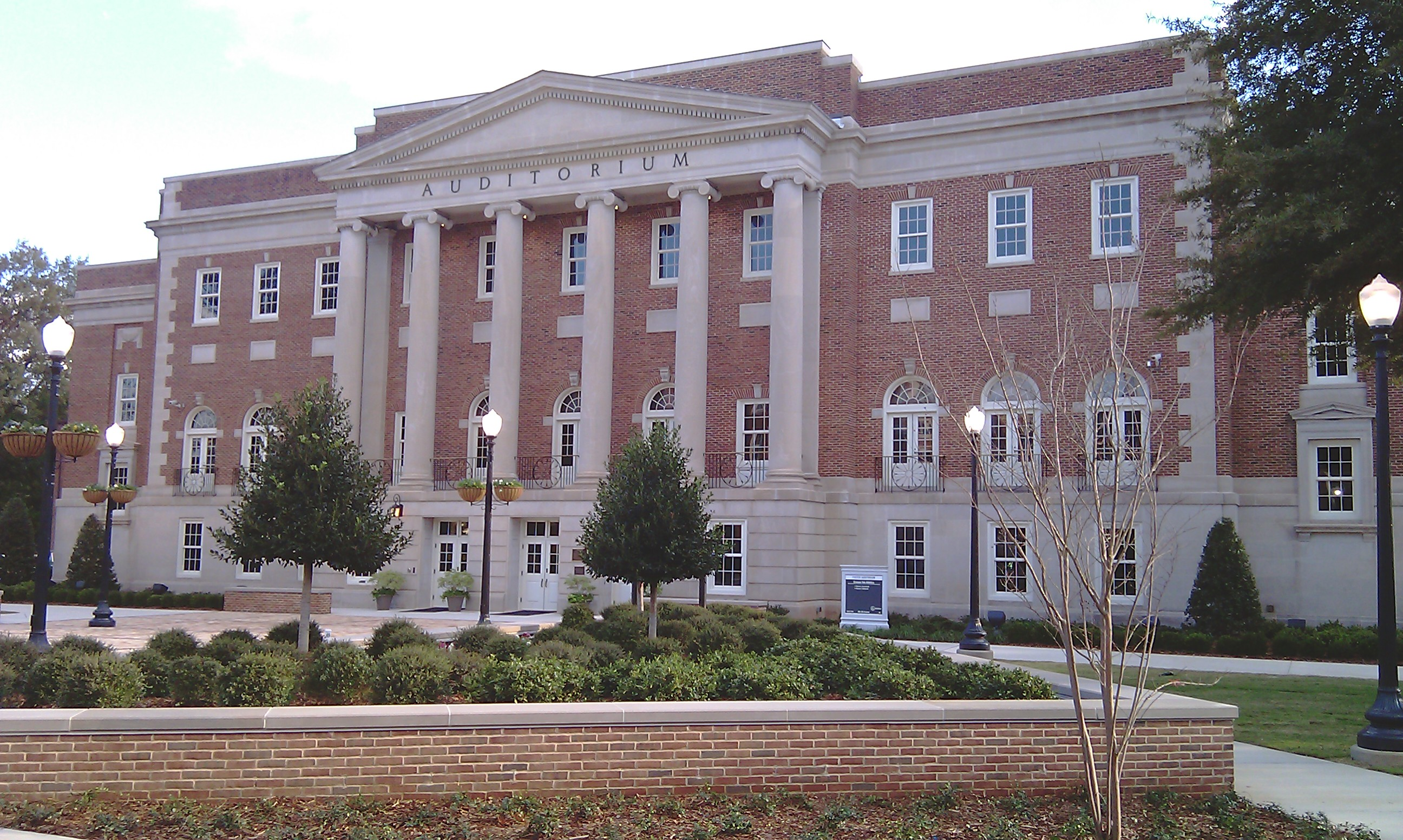
- Interactive map of Foster Auditorium
- Location: University of Alabama; Tuscaloosa, AL 35487
- Owner: University of Alabama
- Operator: University of Alabama
- Capacity: 3,800

Construction
- Opened: 1939

Tenants
- Alabama Crimson Tide; Men's basketball (1939–1968); Women's basketball (1975, 2011–2016); Women's volleyball (1974–1995, 2011–present)

- Foster Auditorium
- U.S. National Register of Historic Places
- U.S. National Historic Landmark
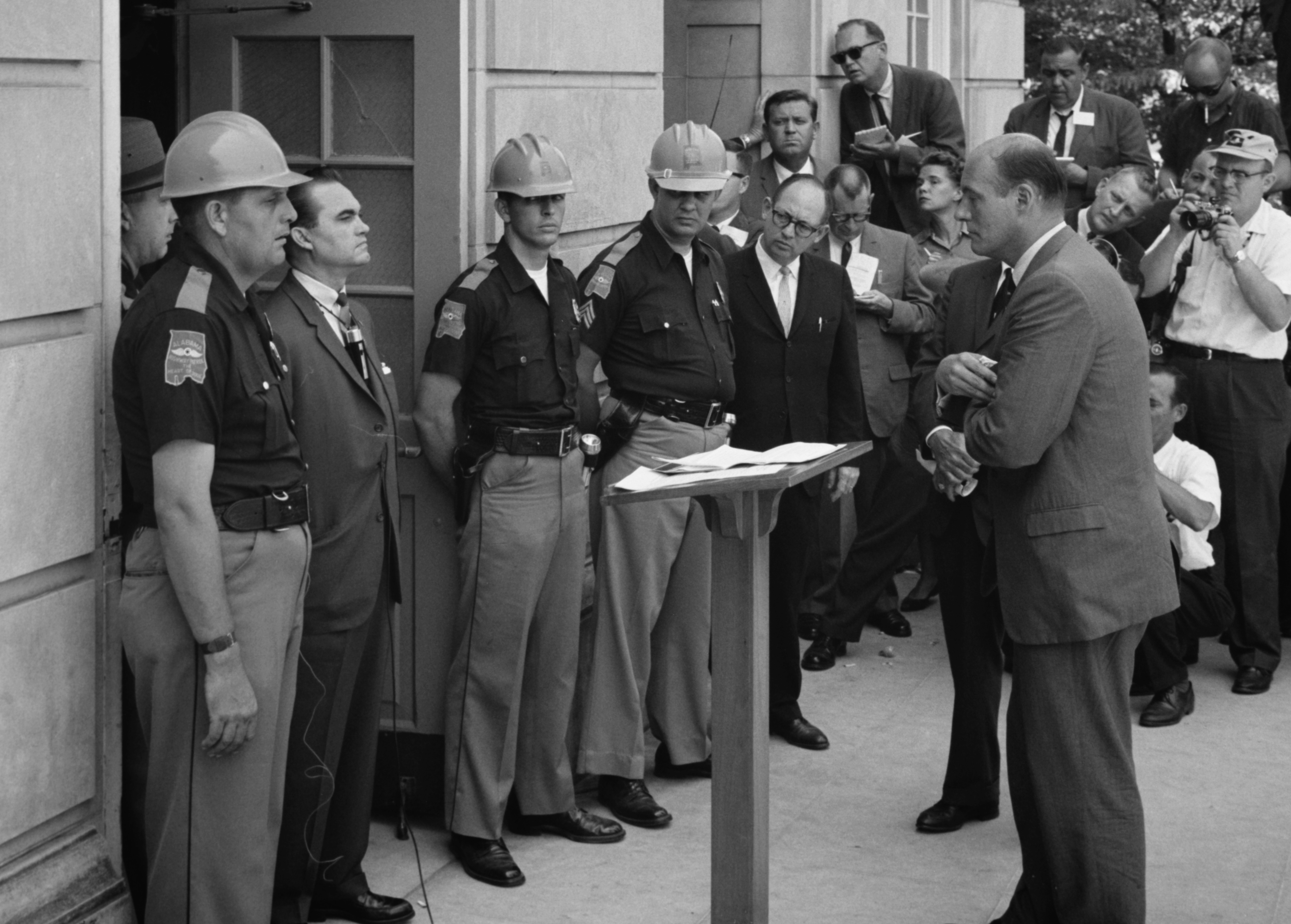
- Wallace standing against desegregation while being confronted by Deputy U.S. Attorney General Nicholas Katzenbach at the University of Alabama.

- Location within Alabama
- Location: Tuscaloosa, Alabama
- Coordinates: 33°12′28″N 87°32′38″W
- NRHP reference No.: 05000457

Significant dates
- Added to NRHP: April 5, 2005
- Designated NHL: April 5, 2005

Foster Auditorium is a multi-purpose facility at the University of Alabama in Tuscaloosa, Alabama. It was built in 1939 as a Works Progress Administration project and has been used for Alabama basketball, women's sports (in the 1970s and 1980s), graduations, lectures, concerts, and other large gatherings, including registration. Its status as the largest indoor building on campus came to an end in 1968 with the opening of the Memorial Coliseum. The building housed the Department of Kinesiology until 2006. In April 2009, the University announced a major renovation for the auditorium. After the renovation, the Crimson Tide women's basketball and volleyball programs moved back to Foster Auditorium, their original home.

The facility is named for Richard Clarke Foster, president of the University of Alabama from 1937 to 1941.

The building was declared a National Historic Landmark on April 5, 2005, for its role as the site of Governor George Wallace's "Stand in the Schoolhouse Door" opposing actions to desegregate the university.

== Sports history ==
Foster Auditorium was the site of a full court shot during the January 4, 1955 basketball game between the University of Alabama and the University of North Carolina. Alabama player George Linn made the 84 foot 11 inch shot at the end of the first half. The shot was featured in Sports Illustrated, and is commemorated at the Naismith Memorial Basketball Hall of Fame. A brass marker was placed in the gym floor to indicate the location of the shot.

== Stand in the Schoolhouse Door ==
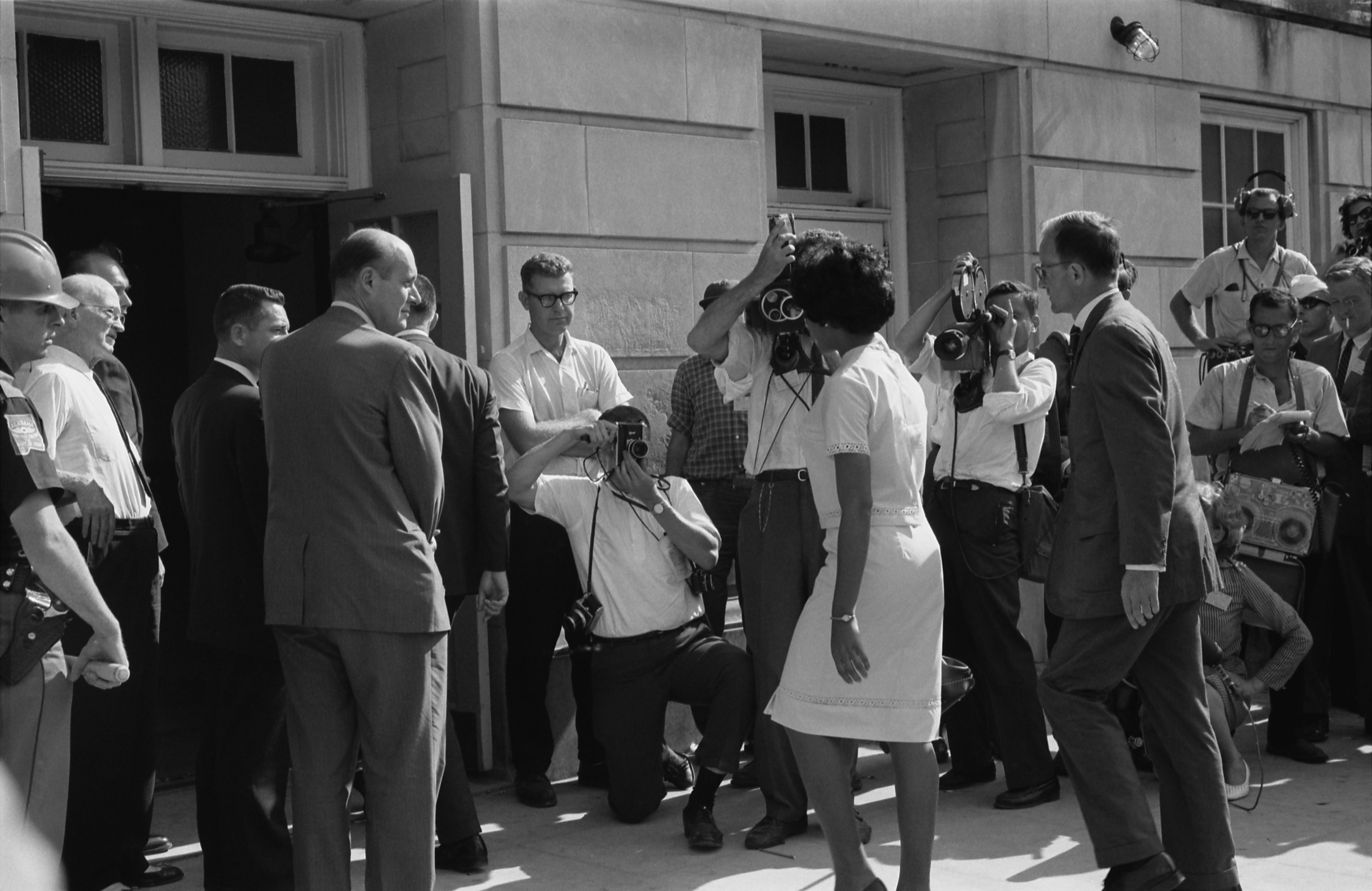
Vivian Malone arriving to register for classes at the University of Alabama's Foster Auditorium in 1963.

More than any other event, Foster Auditorium is known as the site of the "Stand in the Schoolhouse Door" incident. On June 11, 1963, Governor George C. Wallace, making good on a campaign pledge to not allow integration of the university, stood in the doorway of the building on the day of registration. He was attempting to block two black students, Vivian Malone and James Hood, from enrolling at the university. President John F. Kennedy called on the Alabama National Guard to forcibly allow the students to enter the building if need be. Calling it "an unwelcomed, unwanted, unwarranted and force-induced intrusion upon the campus," Wallace denounced the actions, but, seeing as he could not win against the combined efforts of the Guard, federal marshals and Deputy United States Attorney General Nicholas Katzenbach, Wallace stepped aside, returning to the state capital as Malone and Hood entered for registration. The incident is seen as one of the seminal events in the Civil Rights Movement in America.

The scene was depicted (with artistic liberties taken) in the 1994 film Forrest Gump.

The courtyard at the auditorium's rear entrance (the actual "schoolhouse door" in which Wallace stood, as opposed to its front facade, where white students were allowed to enter) was dedicated in 2013 as the Malone-Hood Plaza in honor of James Hood and Vivian Malone. The Plaza is the site of the Autherine Lucy Clock Tower, named for the first black student to attend the University.

== See also ==
- List of National Historic Landmarks in Alabama
- List of NCAA Division I basketball arenas
