= Iowa Big Four men's college basketball =

Hy-Vee Classic
- Hy-Vee Classic Logo
- Sport: Basketball
- Founded: 1979 (Round-Robin), 2012 (Big 4 Classic)
- No. of teams: 4
- Country: United States
- Headquarters: Iowa
- Most recent champion: Iowa (2018–19)
- Most titles: Iowa (15)
- Related competitions: Big Ten Conference, Big XII Conference, Missouri Valley Conference

Locations of Iowa, Iowa State, Northern Iowa, and Drake

The Hy-Vee Classic consisted of games between Iowa's four NCAA Division I men's basketball teams: Iowa, Iowa State, Northern Iowa, and Drake. For 2012–2018, the rivalry consisted of a one-day two game event at Wells Fargo Arena each December, originally called the Big Four Classic but now known as the Hy-Vee Classic, Iowa and Iowa State playing each other in an ongoing-home and home series, and Drake and Northern Iowa playing each other regularly as members of the Missouri Valley Conference. Grinnell College was previously considered a part of the Big Four prior to their demotion to NCAA Division III athletics when they were members of the MVIAA and Missouri Valley Conference.

== History ==
For decades, Iowa (of the Big Ten Conference) and Iowa State (of the Big XII Conference) had home-and-home series with in-state rivals Northern Iowa and Drake (both of the Missouri Valley Conference), with Iowa visiting Northern Iowa in odd-numbered years and Drake in even-numbered years (with the corresponding return trips to Iowa in the opposite years) and Iowa State visiting Northern Iowa in even-numbered years and Drake in odd-numbered years. Iowa State and Drake, in particular, played in 104 of 105 seasons.

In the 2000s, Iowa State, wanting to grow a greater presence in the Des Moines area, offered and played multiple games at Wells Fargo Arena against various teams. When they offered Drake the opportunity to move their rivalry to Wells Fargo Arena, Drake declined. Iowa and Iowa State also offered Northern Iowa and Drake money to play solely in Iowa City/Ames but both schools declined.

During the 2010/2011 seasons, Iowa and Iowa State began to feel pressure from both losing to Northern Iowa and Drake in their non-conference schedule and the need to allow for more games against Power 5 conference competition in hopes of building a stronger non-conference resume for consideration of at-large bids for future NCAA Tournaments. Northern Iowa and Drake did not want to lose the in-state match-ups. A neutral site concept was seen as the best for everyone involved and the Big Four Classic was born.

Hy-Vee signed on as the sponsor of the event. The initial contract ran from 2012–2015. It was later extended to 2017. As part of the 2019 extension, the event was renamed the Hy-Vee Classic.

== Hy-Vee Classic ==
The event was held on the third Saturday of December. In 2013 the event was moved to the first Saturday of December, but attendance from students preparing for finals dropped considerably so the event was moved back to the third Saturday, although all four universities host December Commencement exercises on that same day.

The event consists of two games played back to back. Initially, in even numbered years, Iowa played Northern Iowa and Iowa State played Drake; in odd numbered years, Iowa played Drake and Iowa State played Northern Iowa. The even-odd rotation was switched as part of the 2016–2019 extension. The schools also rotate hosting duties in this order: Iowa, Drake, Iowa State, Northern Iowa.

Which game is first/second and at what times is largely determined by television. Initially there was hope for both games broadcasting to a national television audience; however, this has largely been unsuccessful to date due to both college football bowl games and other established basketball events falling on the same day. The Big Ten & Big XII have rights to the games that Iowa and Iowa State, respectively, compete in. If both conference TV partners pass on the game, ESPN can telecast through the Missouri Valley's deal with the network; otherwise, the games air locally on Mediacom (MC22). In 2015, the Northern Iowa-Iowa State game broadcast via ESPNU (aided by both teams being ranked) and the Drake-Iowa game was broadcast on ESPN3 marking the first national television broadcast from the event.

Financially, the four schools split revenue 25–25–25–25. This has resulted in Northern Iowa and Drake making a much larger profit than they previously did, although it has come at the expense of the loss of a major home game each year. The event did not sell out in its first year, but has each year since.

In addition to the loss of on-campus home games against in-state rivals, Northern Iowa and Drake play one of either Iowa or Iowa State (but not both) in the same season. As UNI and DU cannot face each other in the classic (due to their Missouri Valley Conference affiliations), there is no way to formally determine an official champion between the four schools in a tournament-style format.

== Regular season results ==
=== Key ===
Drake victories
ISU victories
Iowa victories
UNI victories
No game/title

=== Round-Robin era ===
Season	Drake – ISU score	Drake – Iowa score	Drake – UNI score (1)	Drake – UNI score (2)	ISU – Iowa score	ISU – UNI score	Iowa – UNI score	Champion
1979–80	87–66	66–77	DNP	DNP	64–67	DNP	78–46	Iowa
1980–81	72–74	68–90	DNP	DNP	59–85	83–69	86–52	Iowa
1981–82	72–56	49–60	62–58	DNP	68–79	78–65	84–53	Iowa
1982–83	47–52	63–68	73–65	DNP	56–73	73–50	DNP	Iowa
1983–84	72–79 ^{OT}	43–66	55–67	DNP	76–72 ^{2OT}	91–75	DNP	Iowa State
1984–85	73–74	DNP	DNP	DNP	54–50	69–61	DNP	Iowa State
1985–86	77–69	43–55	DNP	DNP	74–61	83–60	DNP	
1986–87	51–55	62–69	86–52	DNP	64–89	79–60	DNP	Iowa
1987–88	77–83	57–70	88–77	DNP	102–100 ^{OT}	80–75	DNP	Iowa State
1988–89	66–80	72–96	72–87	DNP	71–91	88–80	95–76	Iowa
1989–90	114–117 ^{OT}	54–68	63–71 ^{OT}	DNP	87–89	92–80	74–77	
1990–91	69–86	61–80	67–83	DNP	73–75	62–68	72–68	Iowa
1991–92	61–92	56–83	51–56	84–96	98–84	84–66	108–85	Iowa State
1992–93	81–119	65–80	69–59	62–64 ^{OT}	51–78	74–67	64–44	Iowa
1993–94	67–83	86–90	54–71	79–102	86–79	79–66	81–76	Iowa State
1994–95	69–94	68–103	78–67	82–71	76–63	81–62	80–48	Iowa State
1995–96	62–65	66–98	76–82	66–83	50–56	DNP	78–73	Iowa
1996–97	50–74	59–79	68–81	55–76	81–74	DNP	72–63	Iowa State
1997–98	63–61	60–90	60–74	55–68	59–60	48–54	78–84	Northern Iowa
1998–99	56–57	74–78	78–72	57–83	53–74	57–61	83–67	Iowa
1999–2000	48–44	76–83 ^{2OT}	58–54	54–56	79–66	73–41	67–59	Iowa State
2000–01	55–75	71–73	65–63	65–71 ^{OT}	68–80	69–55	74–42	Iowa
2001–02	72–58	59–101	56–71	71–77	53–78	88–69	76–78	Northern Iowa
2002–03	55–76	49–50	75–73	48–59	73–69	75–73	63–54	Iowa State
2003–04	77–83	56–74	56–76	79–84 ^{OT}	84–76	79–76	66–77	Iowa State
2004–05	46–73	75–91	81–72	60–61	63–70	82–99	76–73	Iowa
2005–06	74–89	60–65	72–91	49–51	72–60	68–61	63–67 ^{OT}	Iowa State
2006–07	80–78	75–59	74–61	67–59	59–77	70–57	57–55	Drake
2007–08	79–44	56–51	58–54	65–55	56–47	61–48	62–55	Drake
2008–09	66–63	60–43	59–81	47–46	57–73	71–66	65–46	Drake
2009–10	70–90	67–71	51–67	48–57	81–71	60–63	67–50	Northern Iowa
2010–11	43–91	52–59	49–69	72–69	75–72	54–60	51–39	
2011–12	74–65	68–82	68–83	52–66	86–76	62–69	60–80	Northern Iowa

=== Hy-Vee Classic era ===
Wells Fargo Arena

Date	Winning Team	Score	Losing Team	Attendance
December 15, 2012	Iowa	80–73	Northern Iowa	13,180
December 15, 2012	Iowa State	86–77	Drake	13,180
December 7, 2013	Iowa State	91–82 ^{OT}	Northern Iowa	14,512
December 7, 2013	Iowa	83–66	Drake	14,512
December 20, 2014	Iowa State	83–54	Drake	15,124
December 20, 2014	Northern Iowa	56–44	Iowa	15,124
December 19, 2015	Iowa	70–64	Drake	15,424
December 19, 2015	Northern Iowa	81–79	Iowa State	15,424
December 17, 2016	Iowa	69–46	Northern Iowa	15,028
December 17, 2016	Iowa State	97–80	Drake	15,028
December 16, 2017	Iowa	90–64	Drake	13,828
December 16, 2017	Iowa State	76–65	Northern Iowa	13,828
December 15, 2018	Iowa State	77–68	Drake	12,236
December 15, 2018	Iowa	77–54	Northern Iowa	12,236

On-Campus Facilities

Season	Drake – UNI score (1)	Drake – UNI score (2)	ISU – Iowa score
2012–13	85–55	71–64	80–71
2013–14	76–66	70–67	85–82
2014–15	64–40	69–53	90–75
2015–16	77–44	82–66	83–82
2016–17	79–60	71–63	78–64
2017–18	68–54	71–64	84–78
2018–19	57–54	83–77	98–84

=== Post Hy-Vee Classic era ===
Season	Drake – UNI score (1)	Drake – UNI score (2)	Drake – UNI score (MVC)	ISU – Iowa score
2019–20	83–73	70–43	77–56	84–68
2020–21	80–59	77–69	DNP	105–77
2021–22	82–74 ^{OT}	74–69 ^{OT}	DNP	73–53
2022–23	88–81 ^{2OT}	82–74	DNP	75–56
2023–24	77–63	91–77	DNP	90–65
2024–25	66–52	64–58 ^{OT}	DNP	89–80
2025–26	February 15	March 1	TBD	66–62

== Future match-ups ==
Iowa announced on June 14, 2018 that it was exercising its contractual right to leave the Hy-Vee Classic after the 2018 season, leaving the future of the Hy-Vee Classic in doubt. While Iowa and Iowa State have not ruled out further participation, comments by both schools indicate that they would prefer to not play games in Des Moines and would rather play home games at each school's respective home arena.

=== Outright Big Four Championships by team ===
Team	Number of Championships	Last Season Claimed
Iowa	15	2018–19
Iowa State	13	2017–18
Northern Iowa	6	2015–16
Drake	3	2008–09

== See also ==
- Iowa–Iowa State rivalry
- Northern Iowa–Drake rivalry
- Iowa Corn Cy-Hawk Series
- Philadelphia Big 5
- Crossroads Classic
