= 2013–14 Wichita State Shockers men's basketball team =

American college basketball season

2013–14 Wichita State Shockers men's basketball

Missouri Valley regular season and Tournament Champions CBE Hall of Fame Classic Champions

NCAA tournament, Round of 32
- Conference: Missouri Valley Conference

Ranking
- Coaches: No. 7
- AP: No. 2
- Record: 35–1 (18–0 MVC)
- Head coach: Gregg Marshall (7th season)
- Assistant coaches: Chris Jans; Greg Heiar; Steve Forbes
- Home arena: Charles Koch Arena (10,506)

2013–14 Missouri Valley Conference men's basketball standings
	Conf.				Overall
Team	W		L	PCT	W		L	PCT
No. 2 Wichita State †	18	–	0	1.000	35	–	1	.972
Indiana State	12	–	6	.667	23	–	11	.676
Northern Iowa	10	–	8	.556	16	–	15	.516
Missouri State	9	–	9	.500	20	–	13	.606
Illinois State	9	–	9	.500	18	–	16	.529
Southern Illinois	9	–	9	.500	14	–	19	.424
Bradley	7	–	11	.389	12	–	20	.375
Drake	6	–	12	.333	15	–	16	.484
Evansville	6	–	12	.333	14	–	19	.424
Loyola Chicago	4	–	14	.222	10	–	22	.313
† 2014 MVC tournament winner Rankings from AP poll

The 2013–14 Wichita State Shockers men's basketball team represented Wichita State University in the 2013–14 NCAA Division I men's basketball season. They played their home games at Charles Koch Arena, which had a capacity of 10,506. They were in their 69th season as a member of the Missouri Valley Conference. They were led by seventh-year head coach Gregg Marshall. They were the last team to finish the regular season and enter the NCAA tournament unbeaten until Kentucky did it the next year.

== Description ==
The 2013–14 season was arguably the best season in Wichita State's 108-year basketball history. After defeating Missouri State on March 1, 2014, Wichita State became the first men's Division I team ever to finish the regular season 31–0 (Kentucky matched it the next year), the first team to finish 18–0 in conference play in the Missouri Valley Conference since the 1985–86 Bradley Braves, as well as the first to finish the regular season undefeated since Saint Joseph's in 2003–04. The team's 35–0 start was the best men's Division I start ever (before Kentucky started 38–0 the next year), beating the 1990–91 UNLV Runnin' Rebels who began the season 34–0 and the best Missouri Valley Conference start ever, beating the 1978–79 Indiana State Sycamores, who went 33–0 to start the season. They spent most of the season in the top 10 of both major polls, rising as high as #2 in late February. They continued their run by winning their first MVC tournament title since 1987, and were ranked second in both final major media polls, the highest final national ranking in school history. However, some analysts noted that Wichita State's schedule was relatively easy compared to previous teams that finished the regular season primarily because none of their opponents throughout the season were ranked when they played them, as well as only beating one opponent that was ranked at any point in the season (Saint Louis, who also had a lack of quality wins).

They entered the 2014 NCAA Division I men's basketball tournament undefeated at 34–0. The Shockers beat Cal Poly, 64–37. Two days later, and playing their 5th and final straight game at St. Louis' Scottrade Center, Fred VanVleet's three-point attempt at the end-of-game buzzer against Kentucky bounced harmlessly off the rim, and so went their attempt to become the first men's team in 38 years to win the title undefeated.

== Preseason ==
In the 2012–13 college basketball season, the Wichita State University Shockers, under sixth-year head coach Gregg Marshall, finished the season 30–9 and 12–6 in Missouri Valley play to finish in second place. They advanced to the championship game of the Missouri Valley Tournament where they lost to Creighton. They received an at-large bid to the 2013 NCAA Tournament, receiving a 9 seed in the West Region, where they defeated 8 seed Pittsburgh and 1 seed Gonzaga to advance to the Sweet Sixteen. In the West Region semifinals, they defeated 13 seed La Salle and 2 seed Ohio State in the regional finals to be crowned West Region Champions and advance to the Final Four for the second time in school history and first time since 1965. In the Final Four, they lost to eventual-champion Louisville, 72–68. Wichita State was ranked #4 in the final Coach's Poll of the 2012–13 season.

== Departures ==
Name	Number	Pos.	Height	Weight	Year	Hometown	Notes
Malcolm Armstead	2	G	6'0"	205	Senior	Florence, Alabama	Graduated
Ehimen Orukpe	21	C	7'0"	250	Senior	Lagos, Nigeria	Graduated
Carl Hall	22	F	6'8"	238	Senior	Cochran, Georgia	Graduated
Jake White	22	G	6'8"	232	Sophomore	Chaska, Minnesota	Transferred

== Class of 2013 recruits ==
College recruiting
Name	Hometown	School	Height	Weight	Commit date
Shaquille Morris; PF	Edmond, OK	Edmond Memorial High School	6 ft 8 in (2.03 m)	262 lb (119 kg)	Oct 22, 2012
Shaquille Morris; PF	Recruit ratings: Scout: Rivals: (71)				
D. J. Bowles; PG	Cleveland, TN	Oldsmar Christian High School	6 ft 1 in (1.85 m)	175 lb (79 kg)	Nov 5, 2012
D. J. Bowles; PG	Recruit ratings: Scout: Rivals: (64)				
Ri'an Holland; PG	Hope Mills, NC	South View High School	6 ft 0 in (1.83 m)	165 lb (75 kg)	Jun 27, 2012
Ri'an Holland; PG	Recruit ratings: Scout: Rivals: (63)				
Darius Carter; PF	Akron, OH	Vincennes University	6 ft 7 in (2.01 m)	230 lb (100 kg)	Apr 21, 2013
Darius Carter; PF	Recruit ratings: Scout: Rivals: (JC)				
Overall recruit ranking: Scout: Not Ranked Top 20 Rivals: Not Ranked Top 25 ESPN: Not Ranked Top 25
Note: In many cases, Scout, Rivals, 247Sports, On3, and ESPN may conflict in their listings of height and weight.; In these cases, the average was taken. ESPN grades are on a 100-point scale.; Sources: "2013 Wichita State Basketball Commits". Rivals.; "2013 Wichita State Basketball Commits". Scout.; "2013 Wichita State Basketball Commits". ESPN.; "Scout.com Team Recruiting Rankings". Scout.; "2013 Team Ranking". Rivals.

== Roster ==
2013–14 Wichita State Shockers men's basketball team
Players
Coaches

Pos.	#	Name	Height	Weight	Year	Hometown
F	0	Chadrack Lufile	6 ft 9 in (2.06 m)	251 lb (114 kg)	Sr	Burlington, ON, Canada
F	1	Derail Green	6 ft 7 in (2.01 m)	199 lb (90 kg)	RS Fr	Houston, TX
G	3	Evan Wessel	6 ft 5 in (1.96 m)	201 lb (91 kg)	So	Wichita, KS
F	5	Zach Bush	6 ft 6 in (1.98 m)	175 lb (79 kg)	Fr	Wichita, KS
G	10	Ri'an Holland	6 ft 0 in (1.83 m)	165 lb (75 kg)	Fr	Hope Mills, NC
F	11	Cleanthony Early	6 ft 8 in (2.03 m)	215 lb (98 kg)	Sr	Middletown, NY
F	12	Darius Carter	6 ft 7 in (2.01 m)	230 lb (104 kg)	Jr	Akron, OH
G	14	John Robert Simon	5 ft 11 in (1.8 m)	165 lb (75 kg)	Fr	Oklahoma City, OK
G	15	Nick Wiggins	6 ft 6 in (1.98 m)	187 lb (85 kg)	Sr	Toronto, ON, Canada
C	20	Kadeem Coleby	6 ft 9 in (2.06 m)	251 lb (114 kg)	Sr	Nassau, Bahamas
G	23	Fred VanVleet	5 ft 11 in (1.8 m)	190 lb (86 kg)	So	Rockford, IL
F	24	Shaquille Morris	6 ft 8 in (2.03 m)	262 lb (119 kg)	Fr	Edmond, OK
G	25	D. J. Bowles	6 ft 1 in (1.85 m)	175 lb (79 kg)	Fr	Cleveland, TN
G	31	Ron Baker	6 ft 3 in (1.91 m)	218 lb (99 kg)	RS So	Scott City, KS
G	32	Tekele Cotton	6 ft 2 in (1.88 m)	202 lb (92 kg)	Jr	Marietta, GA

Head coach

- Gregg Marshall (Randolph–Macon)

Assistant coach(es)

- Chris Jans (Loras)
- Greg Heiar (Franciscan)
- Steve Forbes (Southern Arkansas)

Legend

- (C) Team captain
- (S) Suspended
- (I) Ineligible
- (W) Walk-on
- Injured
- Current redshirt

Roster
Last update: 2013-11-08

== Schedule ==
Date time, TV	Rank^{#}	Opponent^{#}	Result	Record	Site (attendance) city, state
Exhibition
11/02/2013*; 7:00 pm		Oklahoma Baptist	W 73–29	–	Charles Koch Arena (10,506); Wichita, KS
Non-conference regular season
11/09/2013*; 1:00 pm	No. 16	Emporia State	W 93–50	1–0	Charles Koch Arena (10,506); Wichita, KS
11/12/2013*; 12:00 am, ESPN2	No. 16	WKU	W 66–49	2–0	Charles Koch Arena (10,506); Wichita, KS
11/14/2013*; 7:00 pm	No. 16	William & Mary; CBE Hall of Fame Classic	W 79–62	3–0	Charles Koch Arena (10,506); Wichita, KS
11/16/2013*; 12:00 pm	No. 16	Tennessee State; CBE Hall of Fame Classic	W 85–71	4–0	Charles Koch Arena (10,506); Wichita, KS
11/20/2013*; 7:00 pm, CBSSN	No. 14	at Tulsa	W 77–54	5–0	Reynolds Center (5,446); Tulsa, OK
11/25/2013*; 9:00 pm, ESPN3	No. 12	vs. DePaul; CBE Hall of Fame Classic	W 90–72	6–0	Sprint Center (7,682); Kansas City, MO
11/26/2013*; 9:15 pm, ESPN2	No. 12	vs. BYU; CBE Hall of Fame Classic	W 75–62	7–0	Sprint Center (8,324); Kansas City, MO
12/01/2013*; 12:00 pm, CBSSN	No. 12	at Saint Louis	W 70–65	8–0	Chaifetz Arena (9,031); St. Louis, MO
12/07/2013*; 7:00 pm	No. 11	Oral Roberts	W 71–58	9–0	Charles Koch Arena (10,506); Wichita, KS
12/14/2013*; 1:00 pm, ESPN2	No. 12	Tennessee	W 70–61	10–0	Intrust Bank Arena (14,356); Wichita, KS
12/17/2013*; 8:00 pm, ESPNU	No. 11	at Alabama	W 72–67	11–0	Coleman Coliseum (9,918); Tuscaloosa, AL
12/22/2013*; 7:00 pm	No. 11	North Carolina Central	W 77–66	12–0	Charles Koch Arena (10,506); Wichita, KS
12/29/2013*; 2:00 pm	No. 10	Davidson	W 81–70	13–0	Charles Koch Arena (10,506); Wichita, KS
Missouri Valley Conference regular season
01/02/2014; 7:05 pm	No. 8	at Southern Illinois	W 82–67	14–0 (1–0)	SIU Arena (4,891); Carbondale, IL
01/05/2014; 1:00 pm	No. 8	Northern Iowa	W 67–53	15–0 (2–0)	Charles Koch Arena (10,506); Wichita, KS
01/08/2014; 7:00 pm	No. 6	Illinois State	W 66–47	16–0 (3–0)	Charles Koch Arena (10,506); Wichita, KS
01/11/2014; 7:00 pm	No. 6	at Missouri State	W 72–69 ^{OT}	17–0 (4–0)	JQH Arena (10,776); Springfield, MO
01/14/2014; 7:00 pm	No. 5	Bradley	W 72–50	18–0 (5–0)	Charles Koch Arena (10,506); Wichita, KS
01/18/2014; 3:00 pm, ESPN2	No. 5	Indiana State	W 68–48	19–0 (6–0)	Charles Koch Arena (10,506); Wichita, KS
01/22/2014; 7:05 pm	No. 5	at Illinois State	W 70–55	20–0 (7–0)	Redbird Arena (9,510); Normal, IL
01/25/2014; 7:05 pm	No. 5	at Drake	W 78–61	21–0 (8–0)	Knapp Center (6,127); Des Moines, IA
01/28/2014; 7:00 pm	No. 4	Loyola–Chicago	W 57–45	22–0 (9–0)	Charles Koch Arena (10,506); Wichita, KS
02/01/2014; 2:00 pm, ESPNU	No. 4	Evansville	W 81–67	23–0 (10–0)	Charles Koch Arena (10,506); Wichita, KS
02/05/2014; 7:05 pm, ESPN3	No. 4	at Indiana State	W 65–58	24–0 (11–0)	Hulman Center (9,245); Terre Haute, IN
02/08/2014; 8:00 pm, ESPN2	No. 4	at Northern Iowa	W 82–73	25–0 (12–0)	McLeod Center (7,150); Cedar Falls, IA
02/11/2014; 7:00 pm	No. 4	Southern Illinois	W 78–67	26–0 (13–0)	Charles Koch Arena (10,506); Wichita, KS
02/16/2014; 4:00 pm, ESPN3	No. 4	at Evansville	W 84–68	27–0 (14–0)	Ford Center (8,802); Evansville, IN
02/19/2014; 7:00 pm, ESPN3	No. 3	at Loyola–Chicago	W 88–74	28–0 (15–0)	Joseph J. Gentile Arena (4,577); Chicago, IL
02/22/2014; 7:00 pm	No. 3	Drake	W 83–54	29–0 (16–0)	Charles Koch Arena (10,506); Wichita, KS
02/25/2014; 8:00 pm, ESPN2	No. 2	at Bradley	W 69–49	30–0 (17–0)	Carver Arena (10,257); Peoria, IL
03/01/2014; 1:00 pm, ESPN	No. 2	Missouri State	W 68–45	31–0 (18–0)	Charles Koch Arena (10,506); Wichita, KS
Missouri Valley Tournament
03/07/2014; 12:05 pm, MVCTV	(1) No. 2	vs. (9) Evansville; Quarterfinals	W 80–58	32–0	Scottrade Center (10,260); St. Louis, MO
03/08/2014; 1:35 pm, MVCTV	(1) No. 2	vs. (4) Missouri State; Semifinals	W 67–42	33–0	Scottrade Center (13,966); St. Louis, MO
03/09/2014; 1:05 pm, CBS	(1) No. 2	vs. (2) Indiana State; Championship	W 83–69	34–0	Scottrade Center (12,125); St. Louis, MO
NCAA tournament
03/21/2014*; 6:10 pm, CBS	No. 2 (1 MW)	vs. (16 MW) Cal Poly; Second round	W 64–37	35–0	Scottrade Center (19,223); St. Louis, MO
03/23/2014*; 1:45 pm, CBS	No. 2 (1 MW)	vs. (8 MW) Kentucky; Third round	L 76–78	35–1	Scottrade Center (19,676); St. Louis, MO
*Non-conference game. ^{#}Rankings from AP Poll, (#) during NCAA Tournament is seed within region MW=Midwest. (#) Tournament seedings in parentheses. All times are in Central Time.

== Honors ==
Fred VanVleet was named one of the ten semi-finalists for the Naismith College Player of the Year Award. Cleanthony Early was named one of fifteen finalists for both the Oscar Robertson Award and the John R. Wooden Award. Early has earned 2014 NCAA Men's Basketball All-American second team recognition from the United States Basketball Writers Association, National Association of Basketball Coaches (NABC), NBC Sports, and USA Today as well as third team recognition from the Associated Press (AP) and honorable mention recognition from Bleacher Report. Early also earned John R. Wooden Award All-American Team recognition. VanVleet was a second team selection by Sports Illustrated and Bleacher Report, and he earned third team All-American recognition from Sporting News and NABC as well as honorable mention recognition from AP.

== Rankings ==
Ranking movement Legend: ██ Increase in ranking. ██ Decrease in ranking. ██ Not ranked the previous week.
Poll	Pre	Wk 2	Wk 3	Wk 4	Wk 5	Wk 6	Wk 7	Wk 8	Wk 9	Wk 10	Wk 11	Wk 12	Wk 13	Wk 14	Wk 15	Wk 16	Wk 17	Wk 18	Wk 19	Wk 20	Final
AP	16	16	14	12	11	12	11	10	8	6	5	5	4	4	4	3	2 (14)	2 (14)	2 (15)	2 (15)	N/A
Coaches	16	16	16	12	10	8	9	8	7	6	5	4	3	2	2	3	2 (8)	2 (7)	2 (7)	2 (6)	7 (1)
