= 2013–14 Evansville Purple Aces men's basketball team =

American college basketball season

2013–14 Evansville Purple Aces men's basketball
- Conference: Missouri Valley Conference
- Record: 14–19 (6–12 The Valley)
- Head coach: Marty Simmons (7th season)
- Assistant coaches: Jimmy Elgas; Carson Harris; Geoff Alexander
- Home arena: Ford Center

2013–14 Missouri Valley Conference men's basketball standings
	Conf.				Overall
Team	W		L	PCT	W		L	PCT
No. 2 Wichita State †	18	–	0	1.000	35	–	1	.972
Indiana State	12	–	6	.667	23	–	11	.676
Northern Iowa	10	–	8	.556	16	–	15	.516
Missouri State	9	–	9	.500	20	–	13	.606
Illinois State	9	–	9	.500	18	–	16	.529
Southern Illinois	9	–	9	.500	14	–	19	.424
Bradley	7	–	11	.389	12	–	20	.375
Drake	6	–	12	.333	15	–	16	.484
Evansville	6	–	12	.333	14	–	19	.424
Loyola Chicago	4	–	14	.222	10	–	22	.313
† 2014 MVC tournament winner Rankings from AP poll

The 2013–14 Evansville Purple Aces men's basketball team represented the University of Evansville during the 2013–14 NCAA Division I men's basketball season. The Purple Aces, led by seventh year head coach Marty Simmons, played their home games at the Ford Center and were members of the Missouri Valley Conference. They finished the season 14–19, 6–12 in MVC play to finish in a tie for eighth place. They advanced to the quarterfinals of the Missouri Valley tournament where they lost to Wichita State.

== Roster ==
Number	Name	Position	Height	Weight	Year	Hometown
0	Ryan Sawvell	Forward/Center	6–8	200	Junior	Mundelein, Illinois
2	Christian Benzon	Guard	6–4	195	Freshman	Gainesville, Florida
3	Jaylon Brown	Guard	6–0	185	Freshman	Fishers, Indiana
4	Duane Gibson	Guard	6–3	195	Freshman	Cleveland, Ohio
5	Mislav Brzoja	Guard	6–4	205	Sophomore	Zagreb, Croatia
10	Jaylon Moore	Forward/Center	6–7	230	Junior	Olive Branch, Mississippi
12	Adam Wing	Guard	6–4	205	Sophomore	Morehead, Kentucky
22	Tyler Ptacek	Guard	6–3	175	Freshman	Parma, Ohio
23	Mike Leazer	Guard	6–3	170	Sophomore	Mount Prospect, Illinois
25	Rokas Cesnulevicius	Forward/Center	6–8	215	Junior	Alytus, Lithuania
31	D.J. Balentine	Guard	6–2	210	Sophomore	Kokomo, Indiana
44	David Howard	Forward	6–8	225	RS–Freshman	Nashville, Tennessee
50	Blake Simmons	Guard/Forward	6–5	210	Freshman	Newburgh, Indiana
55	Egidijus Mockevičius	Center	6–10	225	Sophomore	Vilnius, Lithuania

== Schedule ==
Date time, TV	Opponent	Result	Record	Site (attendance) city, state
Exhibition
10/26/2013*; 7:00 pm	Trevecca Nazarene	W 83–40		Ford Center (2,865); Evansville, IN
11/02/2013*; 4:00 pm	Illinois–Springfield	W 82–74		Ford Center (3,534); Evansville, IN
Regular season
11/09/2013*; 7:00 pm	Martin Methodist	W 87–69	1–0	Ford Center (3,874); Evansville, IN
11/12/2013*; 7:00 pm	at IUPUI	W 84–78	2–0	IUPUI Gymnasium (1,215); Indianapolis, IN
11/18/2013*; 7:00 pm	Mercer	W 89–76	3–0	Ford Center (3,607); Evansville, IN
11/20/2013*; 8:00 pm	Valparaiso	W 100–92	4–0	Ford Center (4,018); Evansville, IN
11/23/2013*; 7:00 pm	Anderson	W 91–68	5–0	Ford Center (4,131); Evansville, IN
11/26/2013*; 8:00 pm, BTN	at Indiana	L 46–77	5–1	Assembly Hall (16,255); Bloomington, IN
11/30/2013*; 2:00 pm	at Ohio	L 59–81	5–2	Convocation Center (4,637); Athens, OH
12/04/2013*; 7:00 pm	at Murray State	L 63–65	5–3	CFSB Center (2,474); Murray, KY
12/07/2013*; 1:00 pm	Miami (OH)	W 78–65	6–3	Ford Center (3,305); Evansville, IN
12/10/2013*; 7:00 pm, FS1	at Xavier	L 60–63	6–4	Cintas Center (9,086); Cincinnati, OH
12/14/2013*; 2:00 pm	Jackson State	L 51–57	6–5	Ford Center (4,097); Evansville, IN
12/21/2013*; 2:00 pm	Butler	L 59–68	6–6	Ford Center (7,035); Evansville, IN
12/28/2013*; 1:00 pm	Grambling State	W 96-61	7-6	Ford Center (3,712); Evansville, IN
01/01/2014; 7:00 pm	at Drake	L 66–94	7–7 (0–1)	Knapp Center (3,071); Des Moines, IA
01/04/2014; 7:00 pm, ESPNU	Indiana State	L 62–81	7–8 (0–2)	Ford Center (4,937); Evansville, IN
01/08/2014; 7:00 pm	Northern Iowa	L 53–80	7–9 (0–3)	Ford Center (3,222); Evansville, IN
01/11/2014; 3:00 pm	at Southern Illinois	W 75–69	8–9 (1–3)	SIU Arena (4,763); Carbondale, IL
01/15/2014; 7:00 pm	at Illinois State	L 78–79 ^{OT}	8–10 (1–4)	Redbird Arena (4,375); Normal, IL
01/18/2014; 1:00 pm	Loyola–Chicago	W 53–48	9–10 (2–4)	Ford Center (4,310); Evansville, IN
01/21/2014; 7:00 pm	at Missouri State	L 61–64	9–11 (2–5)	JQH Arena (4,752); Springfield, MO
01/26/2014; 1:00 pm, ESPN3	Bradley	W 66–60	10–11 (3–5)	Ford Center (5,889); Evansville, IN
01/29/2014; 7:00 pm	at Northern Iowa	L 81–95	10–12 (3–6)	McLeod Center (3,670); Cedar Falls, IA
02/01/2014; 2:00 pm, ESPNU	at No. 4 Wichita State	L 67–81	10–13 (3–7)	Charles Koch Arena (10,506); Wichita, KS
02/05/2014; 7:00 pm, ESPN3	Missouri State	L 54–66	10–14 (3–8)	Ford Center (3,463); Evansville, IN
02/09/2014; 4:00 pm	at Bradley	L 66–83	10–15 (3–9)	Carver Arena (6,732); Peoria, IL
02/12/2014; 7:00 pm	Illinois State	W 104–98 ^{OT}	11–15 (4–9)	Ford Center (3,151); Evansville, IN
02/16/2014; 4:00 pm, ESPN3	No. 4 Wichita State	L 68–84	11–16 (4–10)	Ford Center (8,802); Evansville, IN
02/19/2014; 7:00 pm	at Indiana State	L 54–59	11–17 (4–11)	Hulman Center (5,778); Terre Haute, IN
02/22/2014; 7:00 pm	Southern Illinois	L 56–61	11–18 (4–12)	Ford Center (6,243); Evansville, IN
02/25/2014; 7:00 pm	Drake	W 61–48	12–18 (5–12)	Ford Center (3,483); Evansville, IN
03/01/2014; 3:00 pm	at Loyola–Chicago	W 75–72	13–18 (6–12)	Joseph J. Gentile Arena (1,382); Chicago, IL
2014 Missouri Valley tournament
03/06/2014; 7:05 pm, MVC TV	vs. Drake; First round	W 69–61	14–18	Scottrade Center (5,601); St. Louis, MO
03/07/2014; 1:05 pm, MVC TV	vs. No. 2 Wichita State; Quarterfinals	L 58–80	14–19	Scottrade Center (10,260); St. Louis, MO
*Non-conference game. ^{#}Rankings from AP Poll. (#) Tournament seedings in parentheses. All times are in Eastern Time.
