= 2013–14 Virginia Cavaliers men's basketball team =

American college basketball season

2013–14 Virginia Cavaliers men's basketball

ACC regular season and ACC tournament champions Corpus Christi Challenge champions

NCAA tournament, Sweet Sixteen
- Conference: Atlantic Coast Conference

Ranking
- Coaches: No. 10
- AP: No. 3
- Record: 30–7 (16–2 ACC)
- Head coach: Tony Bennett (5th season)
- Associate head coach: Ritchie McKay (5th season)
- Assistant coaches: Ron Sanchez (5th season); Jason Williford (5th season)
- Offensive scheme: Blocker-Mover
- Base defense: Pack-Line
- Home arena: John Paul Jones Arena

2013–14 ACC men's basketball standings
| | Conf. | | | | Overall |
| Team | W | | L | PCT | W | | L | PCT |
|---|---|---|---|---|---|---|---|---|
| No. 3 Virginia † | 16 | – | 2 | .889 | 30 | – | 7 | .811 |
| No. 14 Syracuse | 14 | – | 4 | .778 | 28 | – | 6 | .824 |
| No. 8 Duke | 13 | – | 5 | .722 | 26 | – | 9 | .743 |
| No. 19 North Carolina | 13 | – | 5 | .722 | 24 | – | 10 | .706 |
| Pittsburgh | 11 | – | 7 | .611 | 26 | – | 10 | .722 |
| Clemson | 10 | – | 8 | .556 | 23 | – | 13 | .639 |
| NC State | 9 | – | 9 | .500 | 22 | – | 14 | .611 |
| Maryland | 9 | – | 9 | .500 | 17 | – | 15 | .531 |
| Florida State | 9 | – | 9 | .500 | 22 | – | 14 | .611 |
| Miami (FL) | 7 | – | 11 | .389 | 17 | – | 16 | .515 |
| Wake Forest | 6 | – | 12 | .333 | 17 | – | 16 | .515 |
| Georgia Tech | 6 | – | 12 | .333 | 16 | – | 17 | .485 |
| Notre Dame | 6 | – | 12 | .333 | 15 | – | 17 | .469 |
| Boston College | 4 | – | 14 | .222 | 8 | – | 24 | .250 |
| Virginia Tech | 2 | – | 16 | .111 | 9 | – | 22 | .290 |
† 2014 ACC tournament winner Rankings from AP poll

The 2013–14 Virginia Cavaliers men's basketball team represented the University of Virginia during the 2013–14 NCAA Division I men's basketball season. The team was led by head coach Tony Bennett, in his fifth season, and played their home games at John Paul Jones Arena as members of the Atlantic Coast Conference.

The 2013–14 season was one of the most successful in UVa's 109-year basketball history. The Cavaliers won only their second ever outright ACC regular season title, with a 16–2 conference record (at the time, their best conference record in program history), as well as only their second ever ACC tournament title. They also won 30 games for only the second time in school history (the first being in 1981–82) and finished third in the final AP Poll—their highest final national ranking in 30 years. On March 16, 2014, the Cavaliers received a #1 seed in the NCAA tournament. In the NCAA Tournament, they defeated Coastal Carolina and Memphis to advance to the Sweet Sixteen, where they lost to Michigan State.

== Class of 2013 signees ==
College recruiting
| Name | Hometown | School | Height | Weight | Commit date |
|---|---|---|---|---|---|
| Devon Hall; PG | Virginia Beach, Virginia | Cape Henry Collegiate School | 6 ft 5 in (1.96 m) | 200 lb (91 kg) | Jun 30, 2012 |
| Devon Hall; PG | Recruit ratings: Rivals: (74) | | | | |
| London Perrantes; PG | Los Angeles, California | Crespi Carmelite High School | 6 ft 0 in (1.83 m) | 170 lb (77 kg) | Sep 2, 2012 |
| London Perrantes; PG | Recruit ratings: Scout: Rivals: (82) | | | | |
Overall recruit ranking:
Note: In many cases, Scout, Rivals, 247Sports, On3, and ESPN may conflict in their listings of height and weight.; In these cases, the average was taken. ESPN grades are on a 100-point scale.; Sources: "Virginia Basketball Commitment List". Rivals.; "2013 Team Ranking". Rivals.

== Roster ==
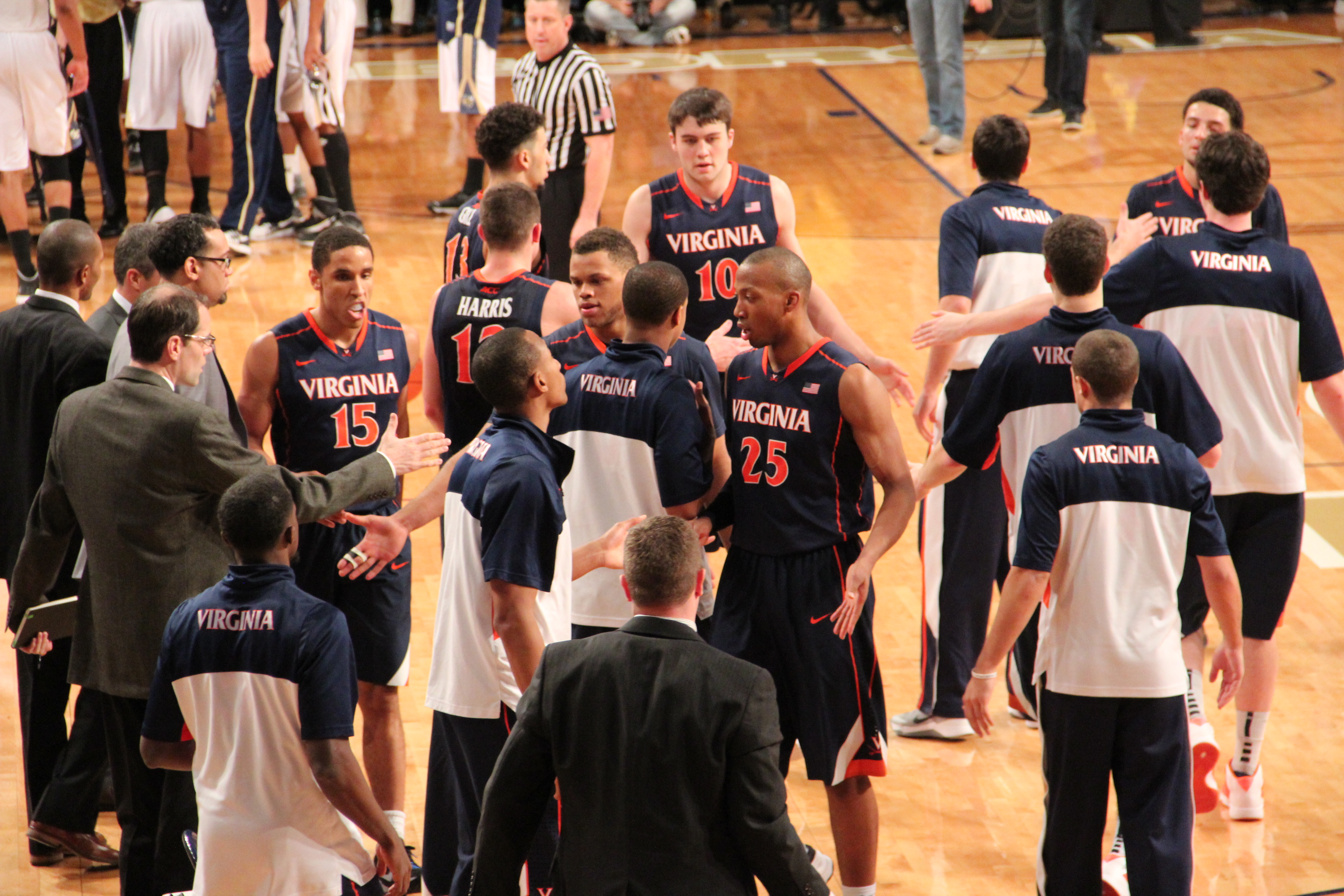
The 2013–14 team at Hank McCamish Pavilion

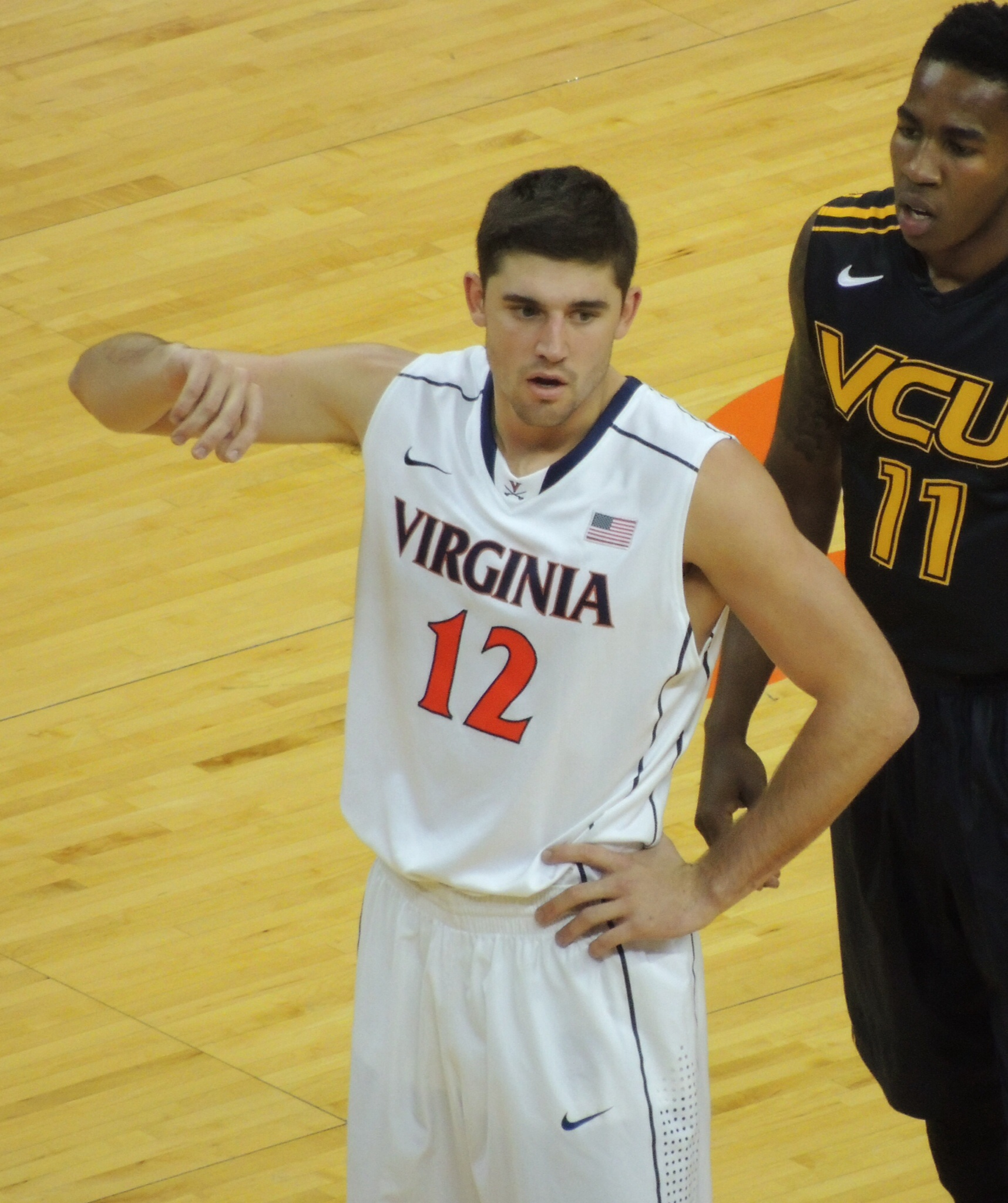
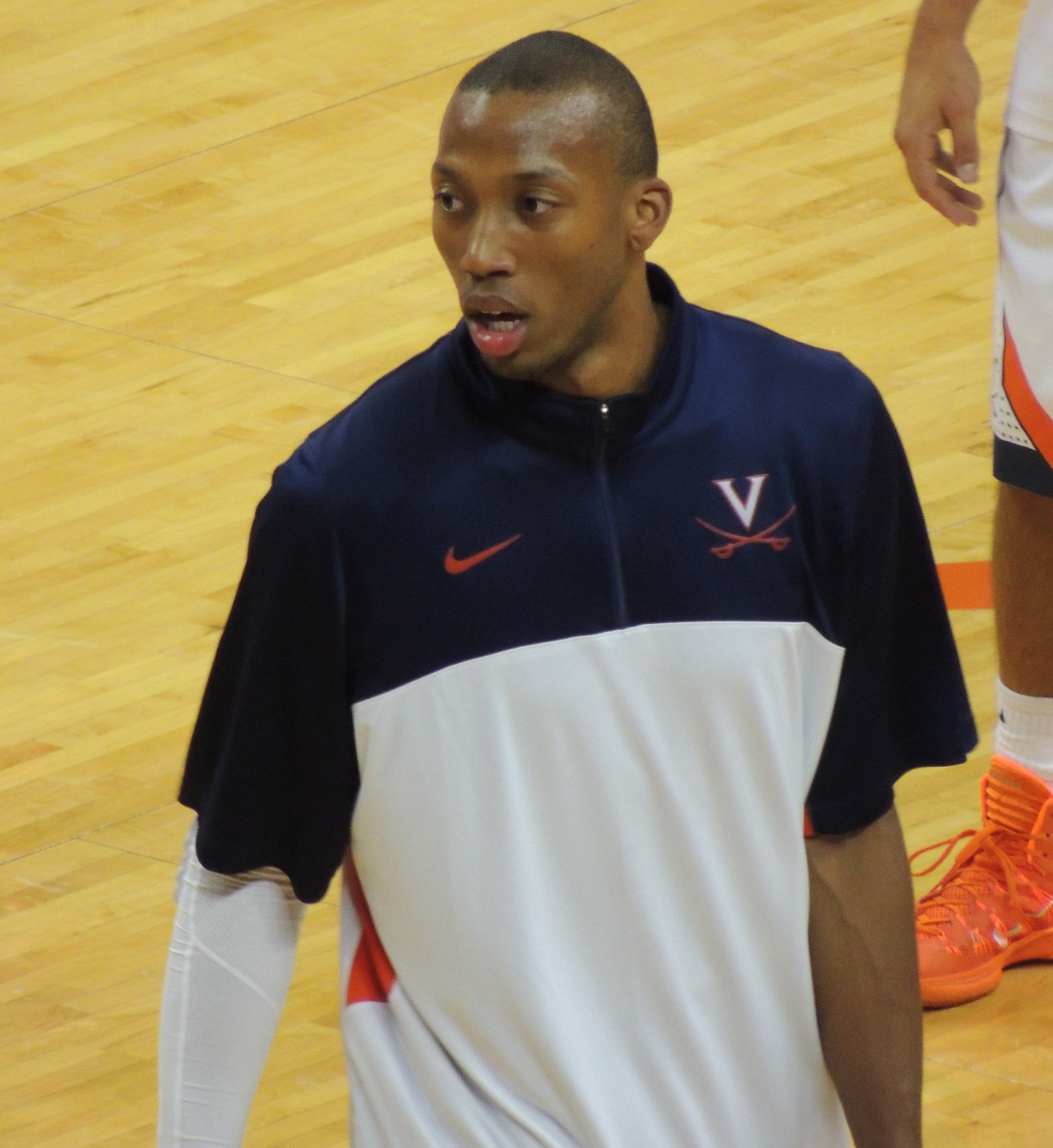
Seniors Joe Harris (left) and Akil Mitchell (right) served as co-captains for the 2013–14 campaign.

2013–14 Virginia Cavaliers men's basketball team
Players
Coaches

| Pos. | # | Name | Height | Weight | Year | Previous school | Hometown |
|---|---|---|---|---|---|---|---|
| G | 0 | Devon Hall (redshirt) | 6 ft 5 in (1.96 m) | 210 lb (95 kg) | Fr | Cape Henry Collegiate | Virginia Beach, Virginia |
| G | 1 | Justin Anderson | 6 ft 6 in (1.98 m) | 225 lb (102 kg) | So | Montrose Christian | Montross, Virginia |
| G | 4 | Maleek Frazier (W) | 5 ft 10 in (1.78 m) | 170 lb (77 kg) | Jr | The Covenant School | Charlottesville, Virginia |
| G | 5 | Teven Jones | 6 ft 0 in (1.83 m) | 182 lb (83 kg) | So | Fishburne Military School | Kannapolis, North Carolina |
| C | 10 | Mike Tobey | 6 ft 11 in (2.11 m) | 253 lb (115 kg) | So | Blair Academy | Monroe, New York |
| F | 11 | Evan Nolte | 6 ft 8 in (2.03 m) | 227 lb (103 kg) | So | Milton | Milton, Georgia |
| G | 12 | Joe Harris (C) | 6 ft 6 in (1.98 m) | 225 lb (102 kg) | Sr | Chelan | Chelan, Washington |
| F | 13 | Anthony Gill | 6 ft 8 in (2.03 m) | 230 lb (104 kg) | RS So | Charlotte Christian/South Carolina | High Point, North Carolina |
| G | 15 | Malcolm Brogdon | 6 ft 5 in (1.96 m) | 217 lb (98 kg) | RS So | Greater Atlanta Christian | Norcross, Georgia |
| G | 21 | Rob Vozenilek (W) | 6 ft 2 in (1.88 m) | 190 lb (86 kg) | Jr | St. Christopher's | Richmond, Virginia |
| G | 23 | London Perrantes | 6 ft 2 in (1.88 m) | 189 lb (86 kg) | Fr | Crespi | Los Angeles, California |
| F | 24 | Caid Kirven (W) | 6 ft 8 in (2.03 m) | 229 lb (104 kg) | So | Woodberry Forest | Raleigh, North Carolina |
| F | 25 | Akil Mitchell (C) | 6 ft 8 in (2.03 m) | 235 lb (107 kg) | Sr | Charlotte Christian | Charlotte, North Carolina |
| G | 30 | Thomas Rogers | 6 ft 6 in (1.98 m) | 206 lb (93 kg) | Sr | Fork Union | Farmville, Virginia |
| F | 32 | Darion Atkins | 6 ft 8 in (2.03 m) | 234 lb (106 kg) | Jr | Landon School | Clinton, Maryland |
| F | 34 | Jeff Jones (W) | 6 ft 6 in (1.98 m) | 195 lb (88 kg) | Fr | St. Anne's-Belfield | Charlottesville, Virginia |

Head coach

- Tony Bennett (Green Bay)

Assistant coach(es)

- Ritchie McKay (Seattle Pacific)
- Ron Sanchez (SUNY Oneonta)
- Jason Williford (Virginia)

Strength and conditioning coach(es)

Mike Curtis (Virginia)

Athletic trainer(s)

Ethan Saliba (Kansas)

Legend

- (C) Team captain
- (S) Suspended
- (I) Ineligible
- (W) Walk-on
- Injured
- Current redshirt

== Schedule ==
| Date time, TV | Rank^{#} | Opponent^{#} | Result | Record | Site (attendance) city, state |
Non-conference regular season
| Nov. 8*; 7:00 pm, ESPN3 | No. 24 | James Madison | W 61–41 | 1–0 | John Paul Jones Arena (11,934); Charlottesville, VA |
| Nov. 12*; 7:00 pm, ESPN2 | No. 25 | No. 14 VCU | L 56–59 | 1–1 | John Paul Jones Arena (14,593); Charlottesville, VA |
| Nov. 16*; 12:00 pm | No. 25 | vs. Davidson | W 70–57 | 2–1 | Time Warner Cable Arena (5,216); Charlotte, NC |
| Nov. 19*; 7:00 pm, RSN | | Navy | W 67–42 | 3–1 | John Paul Jones Arena (9,764); Charlottesville, VA |
| Nov. 23*; 4:00 pm, ESPN3 | | Liberty; Corpus Christi Challenge | W 75–53 | 4–1 | John Paul Jones Arena (10,941); Charlottesville, VA |
| Nov. 26*; 7:00 pm, ESPN3 | | Hampton; Corpus Christi Challenge | W 69–40 | 5–1 | John Paul Jones Arena (8,970); Charlottesville, VA |
| Nov. 29*; 7:30 pm, CBSSN | | vs. SMU; Corpus Christi Challenge | W 76–73 | 6–1 | American Bank Center^{1} (N/A); Corpus Christi, TX |
| Nov. 30*; 9:30 pm, CBSSN | | vs. Missouri State; Corpus Christi Challenge | W 83–63 | 7–1 | American Bank Center^{1} (N/A); Corpus Christi, TX |
| Dec. 4*; 7:00 pm, ESPN2 | | No. 8 Wisconsin; ACC–Big Ten Challenge | L 38–48 | 7–2 | John Paul Jones Arena (11,142); Charlottesville, VA |
| Dec. 7*; 5:00 pm, ESPNU | | at Green Bay | L 72–75 | 7–3 | Resch Center (6,491); Green Bay, WI |
| Dec. 21*; 4:00 pm, ESPN3 | | Northern Iowa | W 57–43 | 8–3 | John Paul Jones Arena (9,714); Charlottesville, VA |
| Dec. 23*; 7:00 pm, ESPN3 | | Norfolk State | W 66–56 | 9–3 | John Paul Jones Arena (9,206); Charlottesville, VA |
| Dec. 30*; 7:00 pm, ESPN2 | | at Tennessee | L 52–87 | 9–4 | Thompson-Boling Arena (16,142); Knoxville, TN |
Conference regular season
| Jan. 4; 12:00 pm, ESPN2 | | at Florida State | W 62–50 | 10–4 (1–0) | Donald L. Tucker Center (5,588); Tallahassee, FL |
| Jan. 8; 7:00 pm, RSN | | Wake Forest | W 74–51 | 11–4 (2–0) | John Paul Jones Arena (10,114); Charlottesville, VA |
| Jan. 11; 5:00 pm, ESPN2 | | at NC State | W 76–45 | 12–4 (3–0) | PNC Arena (15,623); Raleigh, NC |
| Jan. 13; 7:00 pm, ESPN | | at No. 23 Duke; Big Monday | L 65–69 | 12–5 (3–1) | Cameron Indoor Stadium (9,314); Durham, NC |
| Jan. 18; 12:00 pm, ACCN | | Florida State | W 78–66 | 13–5 (4–1) | John Paul Jones Arena (12,765); Charlottesville, VA |
| Jan. 20; 7:00 pm, ESPN | | North Carolina; Big Monday | W 76–61 | 14–5 (5–1) | John Paul Jones Arena (13,045); Charlottesville, VA |
| Jan. 25; 3:00 pm, ACCN | | Virginia Tech | W 65–45 | 15–5 (6–1) | John Paul Jones Arena (14,215); Charlottesville, VA |
| Jan. 28; 9:00 pm, ESPNU | | at Notre Dame | W 68–53 | 16–5 (7–1) | Joyce Center (7,565); South Bend, IN |
| Feb. 2; 12:30 pm, ESPNU | | at No. 18 Pittsburgh | W 48–45 | 17–5 (8–1) | Petersen Events Center (12,508); Pittsburgh, PA |
| Feb. 5; 7:00 pm, ESPN2 | No. 20 | Boston College | W 77–67 | 18–5 (9–1) | John Paul Jones Arena (10,853); Charlottesville, VA |
| Feb. 8; 12:00 pm, ACCN | No. 20 | at Georgia Tech | W 64–45 | 19–5 (10–1) | Hank McCamish Pavilion (8,187); Atlanta, GA |
| Feb. 10; 9:00 pm, ESPNU | No. 17 | Maryland; Big Monday | W 61–53 | 20–5 (11–1) | John Paul Jones Arena (11,568); Charlottesville, VA |
| Feb. 15; 12:00 pm, ESPN2 | No. 17 | at Clemson | W 63–58 | 21–5 (12–1) | Littlejohn Coliseum (8,573); Clemson, SC |
| Feb. 18; 9:00 pm, ACCN | No. 14 | at Virginia Tech | W 57–53 | 22–5 (13–1) | Cassell Coliseum (5,316); Blacksburg, VA |
| Feb. 22; 2:00 pm, ESPN2 | No. 14 | Notre Dame | W 70–49 | 23–5 (14–1) | John Paul Jones Arena (14,114); Charlottesville, VA |
| Feb. 26; 7:00 pm, RSN | No. 12 | Miami (FL) | W 65–40 | 24–5 (15–1) | John Paul Jones Arena (11,812); Charlottesville, VA |
| Mar. 1; 4:00 pm, ESPN | No. 12 | No. 4 Syracuse | W 75–56 | 25–5 (16–1) | John Paul Jones Arena (14,593); Charlottesville, VA |
| Mar. 9; 4:00 pm, CBS | No. 5 | at Maryland | L 69–75 ^{OT} | 25–6 (16–2) | Comcast Center (17,950); College Park, MD |
ACC Tournament
| Mar. 14; 12:00 pm, ESPN2/ACCN | (1) No. 6 | vs. (9) Florida State; Quarterfinals | W 64–51 | 26–6 | Greensboro Coliseum^{2} (21,533); Greensboro, NC |
| Mar. 15; 1:00 pm, ESPN2/ACCN | (1) No. 6 | vs. (5) Pittsburgh; Semifinals | W 51–48 | 27–6 | Greensboro Coliseum^{2} (21,533); Greensboro, NC |
| Mar. 16; 1:00 pm, ESPN/ACCN | (1) No. 6 | vs. (3) No. 7 Duke; Championship | W 72–63 | 28–6 | Greensboro Coliseum^{2} (21,533); Greensboro, NC |
NCAA tournament
| Mar. 21*; 9:25 pm, TBS | (1 E) No. 3 | vs. (16 E) Coastal Carolina; Second round | W 70–59 | 29–6 | PNC Arena^{3} (17,472); Raleigh, NC |
| Mar. 23*; 8:40 pm, TNT | (1 E) No. 3 | vs. (8 E) Memphis; Third round | W 78–60 | 30–6 | PNC Arena^{3} (18,712); Raleigh, NC |
| Mar. 28*; 9:57 pm, TBS | (1 E) No. 3 | vs. (4 E) No. 11 Michigan State; Sweet Sixteen | L 59–61 | 30–7 | Madison Square Garden^{4} (19,314); New York, NY |
*Non-conference game. ^{#}Rankings from AP Poll^1Game played in Corpus Christi, Texas.^2Game played in Greensboro, North Carolina.^3Game played in Raleigh, North Carolina^4Game played in New York City. (#) Tournament seedings in parentheses. All times are in Eastern Time.

== Rankings ==
Ranking movement Legend: ██ Improvement in ranking. ██ Decrease in ranking. ██ Not ranked the previous week. RV=Others receiving votes.
| Poll | Pre | Wk 2 | Wk 3 | Wk 4 | Wk 5 | Wk 6 | Wk 7 | Wk 8 | Wk 9 | Wk 10 | Wk 11 | Wk 12 | Wk 13 | Wk 14 | Wk 15 | Wk 16 | Wk 17 | Wk 18 | Wk 19 | Wk 20 | Final |
|---|---|---|---|---|---|---|---|---|---|---|---|---|---|---|---|---|---|---|---|---|---|
| AP | 24 | 25 | RV | RV | RV | NR | NR | NR | NR | NR | RV | RV | RV | 20 | 17 | 14 | 12 | 5 | 6 | 3 | N/A |
| Coaches | 25 | 25 | RV | RV | RV | RV | RV | NR | NR | NR | RV | RV | RV | 21 | 16 | 13 | 11 | 5 | 8 | 4 | 10 |

== Team players drafted into the NBA ==
| Year | Round | Pick | Player | NBA club |
| 2014 | 2 | 33 | Joe Harris | Cleveland Cavaliers |
| 2015 | 1 | 21 | Justin Anderson | Dallas Mavericks |
| 2016 | 2 | 36 | Malcolm Brogdon | Milwaukee Bucks |
| 2018 | 2 | 53 | Devon Hall | Oklahoma City Thunder |
