= 2013–14 Missouri State Bears basketball team =

American college basketball season

2013–14 Missouri State Bears men's basketball

CIT, First round
- Conference: Missouri Valley Conference
- Record: 20–13 (9–9 The Valley)
- Head coach: Paul Lusk (3rd season)
- Assistant coaches: Jermaine Henderson; Derrick Tilmon; Brad Korn
- Home arena: JQH Arena

2013–14 Missouri Valley Conference men's basketball standings
	Conf.				Overall
Team	W		L	PCT	W		L	PCT
No. 2 Wichita State †	18	–	0	1.000	35	–	1	.972
Indiana State	12	–	6	.667	23	–	11	.676
Northern Iowa	10	–	8	.556	16	–	15	.516
Missouri State	9	–	9	.500	20	–	13	.606
Illinois State	9	–	9	.500	18	–	16	.529
Southern Illinois	9	–	9	.500	14	–	19	.424
Bradley	7	–	11	.389	12	–	20	.375
Drake	6	–	12	.333	15	–	16	.484
Evansville	6	–	12	.333	14	–	19	.424
Loyola Chicago	4	–	14	.222	10	–	22	.313
† 2014 MVC tournament winner Rankings from AP poll

The 2013–14 Missouri State Bears basketball team represented Missouri State University during the 2013–14 NCAA Division I men's basketball season. The Bears, led by third year head coach Paul Lusk, played their home games at JQH Arena and were members of the Missouri Valley Conference. They finished the season 20–13, 9–9 in Missouri Valley play to finish in a three way tie for fourth place. They advanced to the semifinals of the Missouri Valley tournament where they lost to Wichita State. They were invited to the CollegeInsider.com Tournament where they lost in the first round to Murray State.

== Roster ==
Number	Name	Position	Height	Weight	Year	Hometown
1	Keith Pickens	Guard/Forward	6–4	203	Senior	St. Louis, Missouri
2	Austin Ruder	Guard	6–3	196	Freshman	Nixa, Missouri
3	Michael Simpson	Guard/Forward	6–6	190	Sophomore	Spring, Texas
5	Jarmar Gulley	Forward	6–5	218	Senior	Beaumont, Texas
10	Ron Mvouika	Guard/Forward	6–6	201	Junior	Paris, France
11	Marcus Marshall	Guard	6–3	190	Sophomore	St. Paul, Minnesota
12	Devon Thomas	Guard	6–0	162	Freshman	Silver Spring, Maryland
20	Gavin Thurman	Forward	6–7	226	Sophomore	Wichita, Kansas
23	Dorrian Williams	Guard	6–3	199	Sophomore	Oklahoma City, Oklahoma
24	Emmanuel Addo	Forward	6–8	230	Senior	Toronto, Canada
30	Nathan Scheer	Guard/Forward	6–5	201	Senior	Washington, Missouri
35	Bruce Marshall	Center	6–10	236	Sophomore	Fayette, Missouri
42	Christian Kirk	Forward	6–8	218	Junior	Springfield, Missouri
50	Tyler McCullough	Center	6–11	246	Freshman	Fayetteville, Arkansas

== Schedule ==
Date time, TV	Opponent	Result	Record	Site (attendance) city, state
Exhibition
10/27/2013*; 3:05 pm	McKendree	W 104–71	–	JQH Arena (1,905); Springfield, MO
10/29/2013*; 7:35 pm	Missouri Southern	W 93–80		JQH Arena (2,761); Springfield, MO
Regular season
11/08/2013*; 6:00 pm, Ozarks CW	at Old Dominion	W 79–67 ^{OT}	1–0	Ted Constant Convocation Center (6,780); Norfolk, VA
11/16/2013*; 7:05 pm, Ozarks CW	Tulsa	W 96–93	2–0	JQH Arena (6,236); Springfield, MO
11/20/2013*; 7:05 pm	Grambling State	W 97–67	3–0	JQH Arena (4,216); Springfield, MO
11/24/2013*; 2:05 pm	Hampton; Corpus Christi Challenge	W 81–67	4–0	JQH Arena (3,988); Springfield, MO
11/26/2013*; 7:05 pm	Liberty; Corpus Christi Challenge	W 54–52	5–0	JQH Arena (3,898); Springfield, MO
11/29/2013*; 9:00 pm, CBSSN	vs. Texas A&M; Corpus Christi Challenge	W 73–67	6–0	American Bank Center (N/A); Corpus Christi, TX
11/30/2013*; 8:00 pm, CBSSN	vs. Virginia; Corpus Christi Challenge	L 63–83	6–1	American Bank Center (N/A); Corpus Christi, TX
12/04/2013*; 7:05 pm	Cameron	W 81–57	7–1	JQH Arena (3,874); Springfield, MO
12/13/2013*; 7:00 pm, KY3	at Oral Roberts	W 70–67	8–1	Mabee Center (4,262); Tulsa, OK
12/17/2013*; 8:00 pm, ESPN2	at No. 6 Louisville	L 60–90	8–2	KFC Yum! Center (21,335); Louisville, KY
12/21/2013*; 7:05 pm	Alabama A&M	W 68–47	9–2	JQH Arena (4,176); Springfield, MO
12/29/2013*; 2:05 pm	Southeast Missouri State	W 81–78	10–2	JQH Arena (3,889); Springfield, MO
01/02/2014; 7:05 pm	Illinois State	W 78–70 ^{OT}	11–2 (1–0)	JQH Arena (4,945); Springfield, MO
01/05/2014; 3:00 pm, Ozarks CW	at Loyola–Chicago	L 57–89	11–3 (1–1)	Joseph J. Gentile Arena (1,024); Chicago, IL
01/08/2014; 7:00 pm, KY3	at Bradley	W 68–65	12–3 (2–1)	Carver Arena (5,745); Peoria, IL
01/11/2014; 7:00 pm, ESPN3	No. 6 Wichita State	L 69–72 ^{OT}	12–4 (2–2)	JQH Arena (10,776); Springfield, MO
01/15/2014; 6:00 pm, ESPN3	at Indiana State	L 55–70	12–5 (2–3)	Hulman Center (5,895); Terre Haute, IN
01/18/2014; 12:00 pm, ESPNU	at Northern Iowa	L 89–94	12–6 (2–4)	McLeod Center (5,232); Cedar Falls, IA
01/21/2014; 7:00 pm	Evansville	W 64–61	13–6 (3–4)	JQH Arena (4,752); Springfield, MO
01/25/2014; 7:00 pm, MVCTV	Southern Illinois	W 69–63	14–6 (4–4)	JQH Arena (6,206); Springfield, MO
01/29/2014; 7:00 pm, KY3	at Drake	L 74–84	14–7 (4–5)	Knapp Center (3,290); Des Moines, IA
02/01/2014; 2:00 pm	Bradley	W 74–61	15–7 (5–5)	JQH Arena (6,174); Springfield, MO
02/05/2014; 7:00 pm, Ozarks CW	at Evansville	W 66–54	16–7 (6–5)	Ford Center (3,463); Evansville, IN
02/08/2014; 6:00 pm, MVCTV	at Southern Illinois	L 54–72	16–8 (6–6)	SIU Arena (6,249); Carbondale, IL
02/12/2014; 7:00 pm, ESPN3	Drake	W 69–63	17–8 (7–6)	JQH Arena (5,674); Springfield, MO
02/15/2014; 8:00 pm, ESPNU	Northern Iowa	L 58–60	17–9 (7–7)	JQH Arena (6,314); Springfield, MO
02/18/2014; 7:00 pm, Ozarks CW	at Illinois State	L 63–67	17–10 (7–8)	Redbird Arena (4,682); Normal, IL
02/22/2014; 12:00 pm, ESPNU	Indiana State	W 77–66	18–10 (8–8)	JQH Arena (5,207); Springfield, MO
02/25/2014; 7:00 pm	Loyola–Chicago	W 72–56	19–10 (9–8)	JQH Arena (5,455); Springfield, MO
03/01/2014; 1:00 pm, ESPN	at No. 2 Wichita State	L 45–68	19–11 (9–9)	Charles Koch Arena (10,506); Wichita, KS
Missouri Valley tournament
03/07/2014; 2:35 pm, MVCTV	vs. Illinois State; Quarterfinals	W 53–48	20–11	Scottrade Center (10,260); St. Louis, MO
03/08/2014; 1:35 pm, MVCTV	vs. No. 2 Wichita State; Semifinals	L 42–67	20–12	Scottrade Center (13,966); St. Louis, MO
CIT
3/19/2014*; 7:00 pm	Murray State; First round	L 63–66	20–13	JQH Arena (2,910); Springfield, MO
*Non-conference game. ^{#}Rankings from AP Poll. (#) Tournament seedings in parentheses. All times are in Central Time.
