= 2014 Missouri Valley Conference men's basketball tournament =

- Classification: Division I
- Season: 2013–14
- Teams: 10
- Site: Scottrade Center; St. Louis, Missouri
- Champions: Wichita State (3rd title)
- Winning coach: Gregg Marshall (1st title)
- MVP: Tekele Cotton (Wichita State)
- Television: MVC TV, CBS

2013–14 Missouri Valley Conference men's basketball standings
	Conf.				Overall
Team	W		L	PCT	W		L	PCT
No. 2 Wichita State †	18	–	0	1.000	35	–	1	.972
Indiana State	12	–	6	.667	23	–	11	.676
Northern Iowa	10	–	8	.556	16	–	15	.516
Missouri State	9	–	9	.500	20	–	13	.606
Illinois State	9	–	9	.500	18	–	16	.529
Southern Illinois	9	–	9	.500	14	–	19	.424
Bradley	7	–	11	.389	12	–	20	.375
Drake	6	–	12	.333	15	–	16	.484
Evansville	6	–	12	.333	14	–	19	.424
Loyola Chicago	4	–	14	.222	10	–	22	.313
† 2014 MVC tournament winner Rankings from AP poll

The 2014 Missouri Valley Conference men's basketball tournament, popularly referred to as "Arch Madness", as part of the 2013–14 NCAA Division I men's basketball season was played in St. Louis, Missouri March 6–9 at the Scottrade Center. The championship game was televised on CBS on Sunday March 9 at 1:05 pm (central). The tournament's winner received the Missouri Valley Conference's automatic bid to the 2014 NCAA tournament.

== Tournament bracket ==
Opening Round; Thursday, March 6 MVC TV
8	Drake	61
9	Evansville	69
7	Bradley	72
10	Loyola–Chicago	74

Quarterfinals; Friday, March 7 MVC TV
1	No. 2 Wichita State	80
9	Evansville	58
4	Missouri State	53
5	Illinois State	48
2	Indiana State	75
10	Loyola–Chicago	62
3	Northern Iowa	58
6	Southern Illinois	63

Semifinals; Saturday, March 8 MVC TV
1	No. 2 Wichita State	67
4	Missouri State	42
2	Indiana State	62
6	Southern Illinois	59

Final; Sunday, March 9 CBS
1	No. 2 Wichita State	83
2	Indiana State	69

== Tournament notes ==
- Wichita State's championship win made them the first team to enter the NCAA tournament undefeated since UNLV in 1991

== Awards ==
The following were honored as the top players of the tournament:

- Tekele Cotton, Wichita State
- Fred VanVleet, Wichita State
- Cleanthony Early, Wichita State
- Jake Odum, Indiana State
- D.J. Balentine, Evansville

Tekele Cotton of the Wichita State Shockers was named the tournament's most outstanding player (MOP) after scoring 20 points and grabbing 3 rebounds in the championship game against Indiana State. In the game, he scored the second most points behind Fred VanVleet, who added 22.
