= 2013–14 Indiana State Sycamores men's basketball team =

American college basketball season

2013–14 Indiana State Sycamores men's basketball

NIT First round vs. Arkansas, L 71–91
- Conference: Missouri Valley Conference
- Record: 23–11 (12–6 The Valley)
- Head coach: Greg Lansing (4th season)
- Assistant coaches: Lou Gudino; Marcus Belcher; David Ragland
- Home arena: Hulman Center

2013–14 Missouri Valley Conference men's basketball standings
	Conf.				Overall
Team	W		L	PCT	W		L	PCT
No. 2 Wichita State †	18	–	0	1.000	35	–	1	.972
Indiana State	12	–	6	.667	23	–	11	.676
Northern Iowa	10	–	8	.556	16	–	15	.516
Missouri State	9	–	9	.500	20	–	13	.606
Illinois State	9	–	9	.500	18	–	16	.529
Southern Illinois	9	–	9	.500	14	–	19	.424
Bradley	7	–	11	.389	12	–	20	.375
Drake	6	–	12	.333	15	–	16	.484
Evansville	6	–	12	.333	14	–	19	.424
Loyola Chicago	4	–	14	.222	10	–	22	.313
† 2014 MVC tournament winner Rankings from AP poll

The 2013–14 Indiana State Sycamores basketball team represented Indiana State University during the 2013–14 NCAA Division I men's basketball season. The Sycamores, led by fourth year head coach Greg Lansing, played their home games at the Hulman Center and were members of the Missouri Valley Conference. They finished the season 23–11, 12–6 in MVC play to finish in second place. They advanced to the championship game of the Missouri Valley Conference tournament where they lost to Wichita State. They were invited to the National Invitation Tournament where they lost in the first round to Arkansas.

== Roster ==
Number	Name	Position	Height	Weight	Year	Hometown
0	Jake Kitchell	Forward/Center	6–10	247	Junior	Union Mills, Indiana
1	Alex Etherington	Guard/Forward	6–5	205	Freshman	Cicero, Indiana
2	Lucas Eitel	Guard	6–3	195	Senior	Marshall, Illinois
3	Manny Arop	Guard/Forward	6–5	215	Senior	Edmonton, Alberta
4	Brenton Scott	Guard	6–1	185	Freshman	Fort Wayne, Indiana
5	Justin Gant	Forward	6–9	230	Junior	Terre Haute, Indiana
11	Devonte Brown	Guard	6–2	195	Sophomore	Killeen, Texas
12	Dawon Cummings	Guard	6–3	175	Senior	Kansas City, Missouri
13	Jake Odum	Guard	6–4	180	Senior	Terre Haute, Indiana
15	Demetrius Moore	Forward	6–7	230	Junior	Paxton, Florida
22	Brandon Burnett	Guard	6–6	225	Sophomore	Tucson, Arizona
30	Mike Samuels	Center	6–11	290	Junior	Bushkill, Pennsylvania
32	Khristian Smith	Guard/Forward	6–6	215	Sophomore	Indianapolis, Indiana
42	TJ Bell	Forward/Center	6–8	240	Freshman	Charleston, Illinois

== Schedule ==
Date time, TV	Rank^{#}	Opponent^{#}	Result	Record	Site (attendance) city, state
Exhibition
11/03/2013*; 2:05 pm		Rose–Hulman	W 73–37	–	Hulman Center (3,716); Terre Haute, IN
Regular season
11/09/2013*; 1:05 pm, WTWO		Ball State	W 82–73	1–0	Hulman Center (7,221); Terre Haute, IN
11/14/2013*; 8:00 pm		at Belmont	L 95–96	1–1	Curb Event Center (2,613); Nashville, TN
11/17/2013*; 12:00 pm, FSMW		at No. 21 Notre Dame	W 83–70	2–1	Purcell Pavilion (8,257); South Bend, IN
11/22/2013*; 7:05 pm		Truman State	W 80–69	3–1	Hulman Center (4,419); Terre Haute, IN
11/27/2013*; 11:30 pm, CBSSN		vs. Tulsa; Great Alaska Shootout First Round	L 62–63	3–2	Sullivan Arena (3,922); Anchorage, AK
11/29/2013*; 4:00 pm		at Alaska Anchorage; Great Alaska Shootout Consolation 2nd Round	W 97–87	4–2	Sullivan Arena (3,897); Anchorage, AK
11/30/2013*; 6:00 pm		vs. Pepperdine; Great Alaska Shootout 5th Place Game	W 73–70	5–2	Sullivan Arena (3,898); Anchorage, AK
12/07/2013*; 3:00 pm		at Eastern Illinois	W 66–48	6–2	Lantz Arena (1,255); Charleston, IL
12/14/2013*; 2:05 pm, WAVW		at UMKC	W 74–63	7–2	Municipal Auditorium (2,496); Kansas City, MO
12/18/2013*; 8:00 pm, FSMW		at Saint Louis	L 66–83	7–3	Chaifetz Arena (7,205); St. Louis, MO
12/21/2013*; 3:35 pm, WTWO		IUPUI	W 81–61	8–3	Hulman Center (5,980); Terre Haute, IN
12/28/2013*; 1:05 pm, WAWV		Belmont	W 85–73	9–3	Hulman Center (4,837); Terre Haute, IN
01/01/2014; 3:05 pm		Loyola–Chicago	W 70–58	10–3 (1–0)	Hulman Center (5,266); Terre Haute, IN
01/04/2014; 8:00 pm, ESPNU		at Evansville	W 81–62	11–3 (2–0)	Ford Center (4,937); Evansville, IN
01/08/2014; 8:00 pm		at Drake	W 77–73	12–3 (3–0)	Knapp Center (3,465); Des Moines, IA
01/11/2014; 1:05 pm, WAVW		Bradley	W 62–59	13–3 (4–0)	Hulman Center (5,545); Terre Haute, IN
01/15/2014; 7:05 pm, ESPN3		Missouri State	W 70–55	14–3 (5–0)	Hulman Center (5,895); Terre Haute, IN
01/18/2014; 4:00 pm, ESPN2		at No. 5 Wichita State	L 48–68	14–4 (5–1)	Charles Koch Arena (10,506); Wichita, KS
01/22/2014; 8:00 pm		at Loyola–Chicago	W 65–61	15–4 (6–1)	Joseph J. Gentile Arena (1,180); Chicago, IL
01/25/2014; 6:05 pm, WAVW		Illinois State	W 76–62	16–4 (7–1)	Hulman Center (6,528); Terre Haute, IN
01/29/2014; 8:00 pm, WTWO		at Southern Illinois	L 60–79	16–5 (7–2)	SIU Arena (4,821); Carbondale, IL
02/01/2014; 8:00 pm, ESPN3		at Northern Iowa	W 87–81	17–5 (8–2)	McLeod Center (5,127); Cedar Falls, IA
02/05/2014; 8:05 pm, ESPN3		No. 4 Wichita State	L 58–65	17–6 (8–3)	Hulman Center (9,245); Terre Haute, IN
02/09/2014; 3:05 pm, ESPN3		Drake	W 60–56	18–6 (9–3)	Hulman Center (5,449); Terre Haute, IN
02/12/2014; 8:00 pm		at Bradley	W 68–62	19–6 (10–3)	Carver Arena (6,302); Peoria, IL
02/15/2014; 1:05 pm, WAVW		Southern Illinois	W 60–57	20–6 (11–3)	Hulman Center (5,420); Terre Haute, IN
02/19/2014; 7:05 pm, ESPN3		Evansville	W 59–54	21–6 (12–3)	Hulman Center (5,778); Terre Haute, IN
02/22/2014; 1:00 pm, ESPNU		at Missouri State	L 66–77	21–7 (12–4)	JQH Arena (5,207); Springfield, MO
02/26/2014; 8:00 pm		at Illinois State	L 59–77	21–8 (12–5)	Redbird Arena (4,684); Normal, IL
03/01/2014; 1:00 pm, ESPNU		Northern Iowa	L 69–71	21–9 (12–6)	Hulman Center (5,717); Terre Haute, IN
Missouri Valley tournament
03/07/2014; 7:00 pm, MVCTV		vs. Loyola–Chicago; Quarterfinals	W 75–62	22–9	Scottrade Center (9,037); St. Louis, MO
03/07/2014; 7:00 pm, MVCTV		vs. Southern Illinois; Semifinals	W 62–59	23–9	Scottrade Center (13,966); St. Louis, MO
03/09/2014; 2:00 pm, CBS		vs. No. 2 Wichita State; Championship	L 69–83	23–10	Scottrade Center (12,125); St. Louis, MO
NIT
03/18/2014*; 9:00 pm, ESPN	No. (6)	at (3) Arkansas; First round	L 71–91	23–11	Bud Walton Arena (7,096); Fayetteville, AR
*Non-conference game. ^{#}Rankings from AP Poll, (#) during NIT is seed within region. (#) Tournament seedings in parentheses. All times are in Eastern Time.
