= Barry Hinson =

American basketball coach (born 1961)

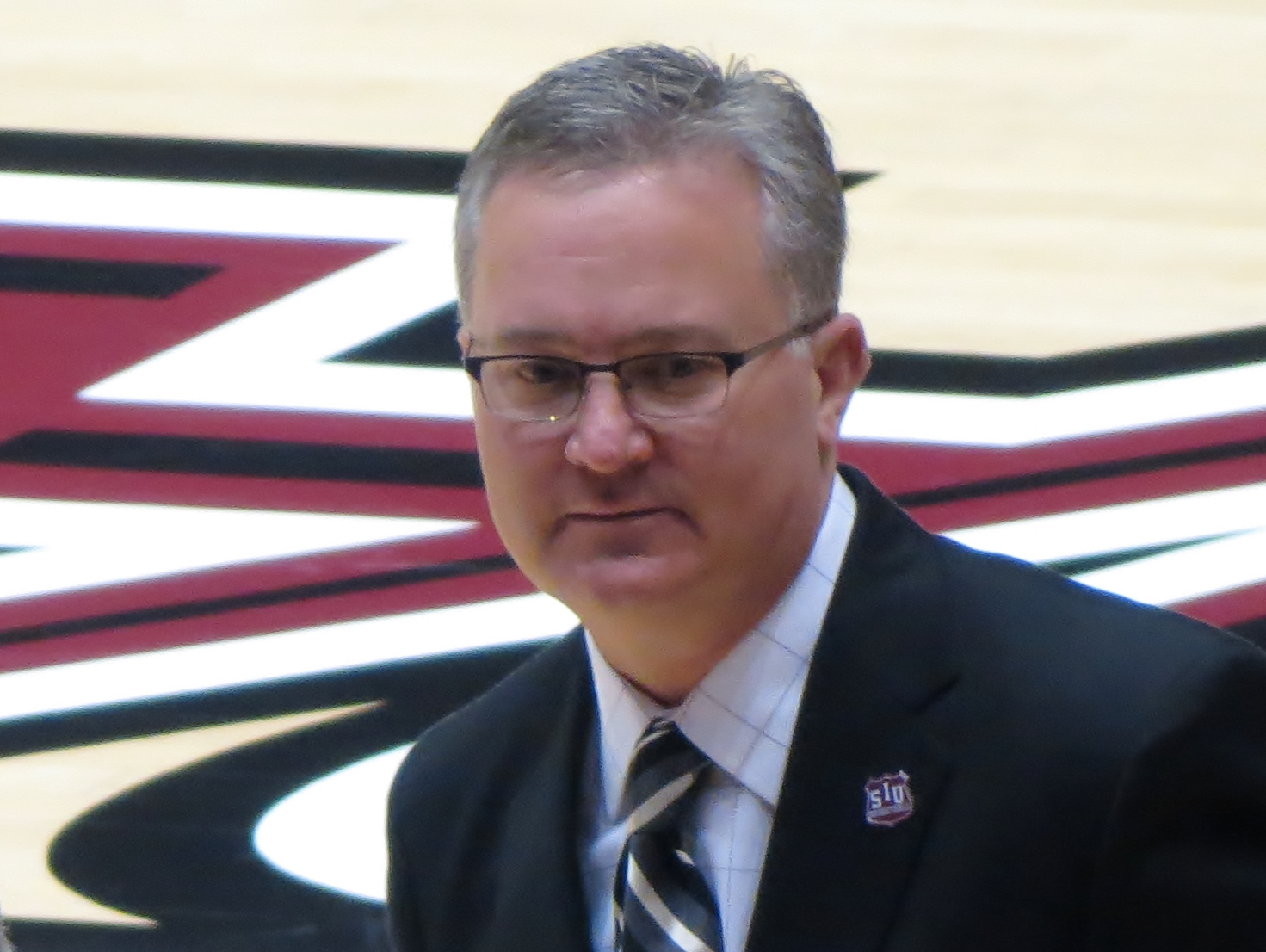

Current position
- Title: Analyst
- Team: Oklahoma State

Biographical details
- Born: May 12, 1961 (age 65); Marlow, Oklahoma, U.S.
- Education: Oklahoma State (1983)

Coaching career (HC unless noted)
- 1982–1985: Stillwater JHS
- 1985–1986: Stillwater HS (assistant)
- 1986–1987: Edmond Memorial HS (assistant)
- 1987–1993: Bishop Kelley HS
- 1993–1997: Oral Roberts (assistant)
- 1997–1999: Oral Roberts
- 1999–2008: Missouri State
- 2008–2012: Kansas (administrative)
- 2012–2019: Southern Illinois
- 2019-present: Oklahoma State (analyst)

Head coaching record
- Overall: 311–241 (college)
- Tournaments: 4–4 (NIT)

Accomplishments and honors

Championships
- MCC regular season (1999)

Awards
- MVC Coach of the Year (2016)

Barry Douglas Hinson (born May 12, 1961) is an American college basketball coach and most recently was the head coach of the Southern Illinois Salukis men's basketball team (SIU). He was born in Marlow, Oklahoma. Before SIU he was the Director of Men's Basketball Operations at the University of Kansas, head coach of Missouri State University and head coach of Oral Roberts University. On March 28, 2012, Hinson was announced the head coach of Southern Illinois University's men's basketball team.

On March 8, 2019, Hinson announced his resignation at head coach of Southern Illinois University's men's basketball team following a loss in the quarterfinals of the Missouri Valley Conference basketball tournament in St. Louis.

Hinson is now Analyst, for the Men's Basketball team at Oklahoma State University.

== Coaching career ==
=== Oral Roberts ===
==== 1997–1999 ====
Hinson led the Golden Eagles to win–loss records of 19–12 and 17–11 in his two seasons at Oral Roberts Golden Eagles men's basketball. His first year, which was also ORU's first season as part of the Mid-Continent Conference, Hinson's squad ended the season just one win shy of regular season champion Valparaiso. The same two schools tied for the conference's best record the following season, each logging a 10–4 mark. Hinson's young men fell to Valparaiso in the MCC tournament final.

Shortly after the season, on April 21, 1999, Hinson accepted the head coaching job at Missouri State (known then as Southwest Missouri State, or SMS), becoming the Bears' 15th head coach.

=== Missouri State ===
==== 1999–00 ====
Hinson inherited a Bears program that had been to the NCAA Tournament Sweet 16 the previous season and featured five seniors, out of seven returnees overall, who were part of that successful squadron. After an 11–4 start out of the gate, the Bears stumbled, losing five of their next six games. However, beginning midway through February 2000, Hinson's team won their final eight regular season contests and fell just short of forcing a tie for the Missouri Valley Conference regular season title. The Bears continued their hot streak, claiming victory in their first two games of the MVC tournament, a streak halted only by a loss in the tourney final.

After amassing a 22–10 record, including 10 wins in their previous 11 games, and ranking with an RPI in the middle 30s, Hinson and his squad were disappointed to be omitted from the (then) 64-team NCAA Tournament field. However, the National Invitation Tournament (NIT) came calling, and SMS drew a first-round matchup at home with Southern Methodist, whom they defeated handily. On the road at Ole Miss in the second round, Hinson and his Bears did not fare as well, getting blown out to the Rebels.

By garnering 23 wins (against 11 losses), Hinson stands as only the fourth MSU head coach to win at least 20 games in his inaugural season. His win tally broke the school record for the most wins by a head coach in his first campaign.

==== 2000–01 ====
The Bears followed up their successful 22–10 campaign with an equally unsuccessful season, finishing 13–16 overall and 8–10 in the conference. They did not participate in any post-season games.

==== 2001–02 ====
The Bears finished the 2001–02 season with a 17–15 overall record, going 11–7 in the Missouri Valley Conference. They did not participate in any post-season games.

==== 2002–03 ====
Picked before the season to finish eighth in the MVC, Hinson's Bears made an impression by finishing in a tie for third place in the conference standings. With a final record of 17–12 overall and a 12–6 Valley mark, the Bears again spent March at home.

==== 2003–04 ====
Missouri State continued a trend of winning more than losing, yet still sitting at home in March. With a final record of 19–14 and 9–9 in the Valley, the Bears finished 95th in the College RPI.

==== 2004–05 ====
Hinson led the Bears to another NIT appearance. Along the way, the Bears upset #23 Southern Illinois, the Missouri Valley regular season champion, in the conference tournament semifinal game. The victory over the Salukis marked the second consecutive year in which SMS/MSU defeated SIU in the conference tourney semifinals. Hinson's Bears lost to Creighton in the finals, but their 18–12 record earned themselves an NIT bid. Hinson led Missouri State to victory over Rice University in the NIT opener, but succumbed to Davidson in the second round.

==== 2005–06 ====
Hinson's 2005–06 team had a win–loss record of 22–9 and achieved an RPI ranking of #21. The Bears again tasted postseason action, defeating Stanford and Houston in the NIT before getting blown out at Louisville in the tournament quarterfinals. It was Missouri State's third NIT appearance under Hinson and the third time in history that MSU reached the NIT quarterfinals.

==== 2006–07 ====
The 2006–07 Bears won 22 games under Hinson's leadership. However, of their 11 losses, five were to MVC foes Creighton and Southern Illinois, and the NCAA Tournament selection committee passed on inviting Missouri State to the big dance. MSU accepted a bid to the NIT for the third straight year. They were handed a home loss by San Diego State by the score of 74–70. Despite having won a modest 22 games, some fans were calling for Missouri State to replace Hinson. However, when the season was complete, MSU President Michael T. Nietzel called a press conference to announce that Hinson would remain as head coach.

==== 2007–08 ====
The Missouri State Bears completed the 2007–08 season with a record of 17–16, including an 8-–regular-season record in the Missouri Valley Conference, highlighted by an 86–83 win over then-20th-ranked Drake at the final men's basketball game at Hammons Student Center. However, the team's mediocre record heightened speculation about Hinson's future, resulted in the creation of a website advocating his dismissal, Fire Barry! and led to his firing. In nine seasons with MSU, Hinson's teams did not make an NCAA Tournament appearance. His tenure has been described as "good, but not good enough."

During Hinson's coaching tenure at Missouri State, his players had the highest Academic Progress Rates in the Missouri Valley Conference. In his 11-year career, including his time at Oral Roberts University, 46 out of 48 players coached by Hinson have graduated, although 18 players left the school early.

=== Southern Illinois ===
==== 2012–13 ====
Hinson was named head coach at Southern Illinois University Carbondale on May 28, 2012. His first Saluki team went 14–17. Josh Swan and Chase Hines were lost to career-ending knee injuries.

==== 2013–14 ====
Hinson's second Southern Illinois team got off to a rocky start but managed to finish sixth in the Missouri Valley Conference with a record of 14–19 (9–9) including a buzzer beater win against Illinois State University in front of a sold out SIU Arena on the last day of the regular season.

==== 2014–15 ====
The Southern Illinois team was the 22nd youngest team in the NCAA and struggled to a 12–21 (4–14) record and a ninth-place finish in the Missouri Valley.

After the end of the season five players including two starting freshmen Jordan Caroline and Dion Lavender transferred. Three players were complaining about playing time.

Assistant coach Tom Hankins also left during the off-season in order to take the head coaching position and Division II University of Central Oklahoma. Brad Autry, a former Marquette and Hawaii assistant took Hankin's place.

==== 2015–16 ====
The team added two junior college guards in Mike Rodriguez and Leo Vincent, and added freshmen Rudy Stradnieks and Sean Lloyd. Despite being picked to finish ninth in the Missouri Valley, Hinson lead the improved Salukis to early season success with an 11–2 non-conference record. The Salukis finished tied for fourth in the Missouri Valley regular season before looking overmatched and losing to Northern Iowa in the conference tournament. They ended 22–10 overall and 11–7 in MVC play, marking the first winning season for the Salukis since 2007–08 and the first twenty win season since 2006–07. However, a weak non-conference schedule and a below average year for its conference meant no NCAA or NIT bid for the team.

On November 28, Hinson picked up his 250th career victory when the Salukis defeated the University of Portland at the Corpus Christi Classic 80–79 when Portland's potential game winning shot got wedged between the rim and backboard as time expired.

On January 20, Hinson picked up his 226th victory while coaching in the Missouri Valley when the Salukis defeated Indiana State University 79–66 at the SIU Arena. This put him above former SIU coach Rich Herrin as fourth all-time in the conference.

Hinson was named Missouri Valley Coach of the Year at the end of the season.

Anthony Beane Jr., one of Hinson's first SIU recruits, was named First-Team all Missouri Valley Conference and finished 3rd in all-time scoring for SIU.

== Administrative career ==
After Hinson was fired by Missouri State, he worked for the University of Kansas in two different administrative positions. First he was director of external relations for men's basketball for two seasons. Later, he was appointed Director of Men's Basketball Operations in May 2010.

== Head coaching record ==
Record table
Season	Team	Overall	Conference	Standing	Postseason
Oral Roberts Golden Eagles (Summit League) (1997–1999)
1997–98	Oral Roberts	19–12	12–4	2nd	
1998–99	Oral Roberts	17–11	10–4	T–1st	
Oral Roberts:		36–23 (.610)	22–8 (.733)		
Southwest Missouri State Bears (Missouri Valley Conference) (1999–2005)
1999–00	Southwest Missouri State	23–11	13–5	2nd	NIT 2nd Round
2000–01	Southwest Missouri State	13–16	8–10	T–7th	
2001–02	Southwest Missouri State	17–15	11–7	4th	
2002–03	Southwest Missouri State	17–12	12–6	T–3rd	
2003–04	Southwest Missouri State	19–14	9–9	5th	
2004–05	Southwest Missouri State	19–13	10–8	5th	NIT 2nd Round
Missouri State Bears (Missouri Valley Conference) (2005–2008)
2005–06	Missouri State	22–9	12–6	T–2nd	NIT Quarterfinals
2006–07	Missouri State	22–11	12–6	3rd	NIT 1st Round
2007–08	Missouri State	17–16	8–10	T–7th	
Missouri State:		169–117 (.591)	95–67 (.586)		
Southern Illinois Salukis (Missouri Valley Conference) (2012–2019)
2012–13	Southern Illinois	14–17	6–12	10th	
2013–14	Southern Illinois	14–19	9–9	6th	
2014–15	Southern Illinois	12–21	4–14	9th	
2015–16	Southern Illinois	22–10	11–7	T–4th	
2016–17	Southern Illinois	17–16	9–9	T–3rd	
2017–18	Southern Illinois	20–13	11–7	2nd	
2018–19	Southern Illinois	17–15	10–8	T–3rd	
Southern Illinois:		116–106 (.523)	60–66 (.476)		
Total:		321–246 (.566)	177–141 (.557)		
National champion Postseason invitational champion Conference regular season champion Conference regular season and conference tournament champion Division regular season champion Division regular season and conference tournament champion Conference tournament champion
