= 2013–14 Illinois State Redbirds men's basketball team =

American college basketball season

2013–14 Illinois State Redbirds men's basketball

CBI, Semifinal
- Conference: Missouri Valley Conference
- Record: 18–16 (9–9 MVC)
- Head coach: Dan Muller (2nd season)
- Assistant coaches: Dana Ford; Torrey Ward; Luke Yaklich
- Home arena: Doug Collins Court at Redbird Arena

2013–14 Missouri Valley Conference men's basketball standings
	Conf.				Overall
Team	W		L	PCT	W		L	PCT
No. 2 Wichita State †	18	–	0	1.000	35	–	1	.972
Indiana State	12	–	6	.667	23	–	11	.676
Northern Iowa	10	–	8	.556	16	–	15	.516
Missouri State	9	–	9	.500	20	–	13	.606
Illinois State	9	–	9	.500	18	–	16	.529
Southern Illinois	9	–	9	.500	14	–	19	.424
Bradley	7	–	11	.389	12	–	20	.375
Drake	6	–	12	.333	15	–	16	.484
Evansville	6	–	12	.333	14	–	19	.424
Loyola Chicago	4	–	14	.222	10	–	22	.313
† 2014 MVC tournament winner Rankings from AP poll

The 2013–14 Illinois State Redbirds men's basketball team represented Illinois State University during the 2013–14 NCAA Division I men's basketball season. The Redbirds, led by second-year head coach Dan Muller, played their home games at Redbird Arena in Normal, Illinois as a member of the Missouri Valley Conference. They finished the season 18–16, 9–9 in conference play, to finish in a tie for fourth place. As the number five seed in the MVC tournament, they were defeated by Missouri State in a quarterfinal game. They received an invitation to the College Basketball Invitational where they won over Morehead State in the first round and Texas A&M in the quarterfinal round before losing to Siena in the semifinal round.

== Roster ==
2013–14 Illinois State Redbirds men's basketball team
Players
Coaches

Pos.	#	Name	Height	Weight	Year	Previous school	Hometown
G	0	Kaza Keane	6 ft 1 in (1.85 m)	185 lb (84 kg)	So	Christian Faith Center Academy	Ajax, Ontario
G	1	Paris Lee	5 ft 11 in (1.8 m)	165 lb (75 kg)	Fr	Proviso East High School	Maywood, IL
G	3	Daishon Knight	6 ft 1 in (1.85 m)	175 lb (79 kg)	Jr	Lake Clifton Eastern High School; Odessa College	Baltimore, MD
G	4	Bobby Hunter	5 ft 10 in (1.78 m)	190 lb (86 kg)	RS Jr	Bishop Manogue High School; Santa Fe College	Reno, NV
F	5	Jamaal Samuel	6 ft 9 in (2.06 m)	200 lb (91 kg)	RS So	O. Perry Walker High School; South Plains College	New Orleans, LA
C	10	John Jones	6 ft 9 in (2.06 m)	260 lb (118 kg)	Jr	The Howe School	Saint Michael, Barbados
F	11	MiKyle McIntosh (redshirt)	6 ft 7 in (2.01 m)	230 lb (104 kg)	Fr	22 Feet Academy	Pickering, ON
G	12	Tony Wills	6 ft 3 in (1.91 m)	185 lb (84 kg)	Fr	Ben Davis High School	Indianapolis, IN
G	15	Nick Zeisloft	6 ft 4 in (1.93 m)	185 lb (84 kg)	RS So	Lyons Township High School	LaGrange, IL
C	22	Reggie Lynch	6 ft 10 in (2.08 m)	230 lb (104 kg)	Fr	Edina High School	Edina, MN
G	23	Zach Lofton	6 ft 4 in (1.93 m)	200 lb (91 kg)	So	Quakerdale Prep School; San Jacinto College	Saint Paul, MN
F	24	Deontae Hawkins (redshirt)	6 ft 8 in (2.03 m)	215 lb (98 kg)	Fr	Dunbar High School	Dayton, OH
F	25	Michael Middlebrooks	6 ft 9 in (2.06 m)	210 lb (95 kg)	Jr	Rainier Beach High School; North Idaho College	Seattle, WA
G	31	Matt Stacho (W)	6 ft 1 in (1.85 m)	180 lb (82 kg)	So	Naperville North High School	Naperville, IL

Head coach

- Dan Muller (Illinois State)

Assistant coach(es)

- Dana Ford (Illinois State)
- Torrey Ward (UAB)
- Luke Yaklich (Illinois State)

Legend

- (C) Team captain
- (S) Suspended
- (I) Ineligible
- (W) Walk-on
- Injured
- Current redshirt

Roster
Last update: March 27, 2014

== Schedule and results ==
Date time, TV	Rank^{#}	Opponent^{#}	Result	Record	High points	High rebounds	High assists	Site (attendance) city, state
Exhibition Season
November 3, 2013*; 4:35 pm		Quincy	W 84–65		19 – Lofton	–	–	Doug Collins Court at Redbird Arena (3,877); Normal, IL
Non-Conference Regular Season
November 8, 2013*; 6:00 pm, CSN Chicago Plus		at No. 14 VCU	L 58–96	0–1	12 – Lofton	7 – Jones, Zeisloft	2 – Hunter, Keane, Lee	Stuart C. Siegel Center (7,741); Richmond, VA
November 12, 2013*; 7:05 pm, CSN Chicago/ESPN3		Drexel	L 70–78	0–2	14 – Hunter	15 – Middlebrooks	4 – Keane	Doug Collins Court at Redbird Arena (4,313); Normal, IL
November 17, 2013*; 7:30 pm		at Northwestern	W 68–64	1–2	15 – Knight, Lofton	11 – Middlebrooks	4 – Keane, Lee	Welsh–Ryan Arena (6,025); Evanston, IL
November 20, 2013*; 7:05 pm		Manhattan	L 70–79	1–3	21 – Knight	10 – Middlebrooks	4 – Lee	Doug Collins Court at Redbird Arena (4,690); Normal, IL
November 27, 2013*; 10:15 pm		vs. Vermont; University of San Francisco; Golden Gate Challenge [Round–Robin]	L 76–87	1–4	19 – Lofton	6 – Jones	4 – Knight	War Memorial Gymnasium (697); San Francisco, CA
November 29, 2013*; 10:15 pm		vs. Sonoma State; University of San Francisco; Golden Gate Challenge [Round–Robin]	W 75–58	2–4	21 – Knight	7 – Lynch	4 – Hunter	War Memorial Gymnasium (475); San Francisco, CA
November 30, 2013*; 10:15 pm		at San Francisco; University of San Francisco; Golden Gate Challenge [Round–Robin]	W 90–76	3–4	15 – Hunter, Lofton, Lee	8 – Knight	6 – Knight	War Memorial Gymnasium (1,414); San Francisco, CA
December 4, 2013*; 7:05 pm		Chicago State	W 75–56	4–4	15 – Knight	7 – Knight, Zeisloft	3 – Hunter, Lofton	Doug Collins Court at Redbird Arena (4,211); Normal, IL
December 7, 2013*; 7:05 pm, CSN Chicago		No. 25 Dayton	W 81–75	5–4	20 – Knight	6 – Knight, Lynch	4 – Knight	Doug Collins Court at Redbird Arena (6,697); Normal, IL
December 16, 2013*; 6:00 pm		at Oakland	L 75–90	5–5	14 – Knight, Lee	6 – Wills	4 – Wills	Athletics Center O'rena (1,005); Rochester, MI
December 19, 2013*; 7:05 pm		Tennessee State	W 64–58	6–5	16 – Knight	6 – Zeisloft, Lynch	6 – Lee	Doug Collins Court at Redbird Arena (4,061); Normal, IL
December 22, 2013*; 3:35 pm, CSN Chicago		DePaul	W 69–64	7–5	16 – Knight	6 – Knight	5 – Lofton	Doug Collins Court at Redbird Arena (5,345); Normal, IL
Missouri Valley Conference Regular Season
January 2, 2014; 7:05 pm		at Missouri State	L 70–78 ^{OT}	7–6 (0–1)	15 – Knight	7 – Knight	5 – Lee	JQH Arena (4,945); Springfield, MO
January 5, 2014; 1:05 pm		Southern Illinois	W 66–48	8–6 (1–1)	18 – Lofton	7 – Lee	5 – Keane	Doug Collins Court at Redbird Arena (1,060); Normal, IL
January 8, 2014; 7:00 pm		at No. 6 Wichita State	L 47–66	8–7 (1–2)	11 – Hunter	7 – Lofton	3 – Hunter, Lofton	Charles Koch Arena (10,506); Wichita, KS
January 11, 2014; 7:05 pm, MVC Network (CSN Chicago Plus/FSMW)		Loyola–Chicago	W 59–50	9–7 (2–2)	12 – Zeisloft	7 – Jones	4 – Lofton	Doug Collins Court at Redbird Arena (5,354); Normal, IL
January 15, 2014; 7:05 pm		Evansville	W 79–78 ^{OT}	10–7 (3–2)	21 – Lofton	6 – Lofton, Lynch, Wills	3 – Lofton	Doug Collins Court at Redbird Arena (4,375); Normal, IL
January 18, 2014; 7:05 pm, CSN Chicago/ESPN3		at Drake	W 77–63	11–7 (4–2)	17 – Knight	7 – Knight, Lynch	6 – Hunter	The Knapp Center (3,701); Des Moines, IA
January 22, 2014; 7:05 pm		No. 5 Wichita State	L 55–70	11–8 (4–3)	12 – Knight	8 – Knight	2 – Keane	Doug Collins Court at Redbird Arena (9,510); Normal, IL
January 25, 2014; 5:05 pm		at Indiana State	L 62–76	11–9 (4–4)	13 – Hunter	7 – Lynch	3 – Hunter	Hulman Center (6,528); Terre Haute, IN
January 29, 2014; 7:00 pm		at Bradley; I–74 Rivalry	L 45–64	11–10 (4–5)	8 – Knight, Lee	8 – Hunter	4 – Hunter	Carver Arena (8,403); Peoria, IL
February 1, 2014; 3:05 pm		Drake	W 75–57	12–10 (5–5)	19 – Hunter	7 – Lofton	4 – Hunter	Doug Collins Court at Redbird Arena (5,874); Normal, IL
February 5, 2014; 7:05 pm		Northern Iowa	W 76–65	13–10 (6–5)	17 – Hunter	6 – Lynch	5 – Lee	Doug Collins Court at Redbird Arena (4,021); Normal, IL
February 9, 2014; 3:00 pm, ESPN3		at Loyola–Chicago	L 69–79	13–11 (6–6)	14 – Lee	4 – Hunter, Knight	5 – Knight	Joseph J. Gentile Arena (2,664); Chicago, IL
February 12, 2014; 7:05 pm		at Evansville	L 98–104 ^{OT}	13–12 (6–7)	18 – Zeisloft	9 – Hunter	6 – Hunter	Ford Center (3,151); Evansville, IN
February 15, 2014; 6:05 pm, MVC Network (CSN Chicago/FSMW)		Bradley; I–74 Rivalry	W 70–54	14–12 (7–7)	26 – Knight	8 – Samuel	5 – Hunter	Doug Collins Court at Redbird Arena (8,111); Normal, IL
February 18, 2014; 7:05 pm		Missouri State	W 67–63	15–12 (8–7)	17 – Knight	5 – K⁬night	5 – Knight	Doug Collins Court at Redbird Arena (4,682); Normal, IL
February 23, 2014; 4:00 pm, MVC Network (CSN Chicago/FSMW)		at Northern Iowa	L 59–72	15–13 (8–8)	24 – Lofton	7 – Lynch	5 – Knight	McLeod Center (4,385); Cedar Falls, IA
February 26, 2014; 7:05 pm		Indiana State	W 77–59	16–13 (9–8)	20 – Knight	8 – Knight, Lynch	4 – Hunter	Doug Collins Court at Redbird Arena (4,684); Normal, IL
March 1, 2014; 3:00 pm, CSN Chicago/ESPN3		at Southern Illinois	L 65–66	16–14 (9–9)	15 – Knight	5 – Knight	2 – Zeisloft, Lee	SIU Arena (8,339); Carbondale, IL
State Farm Missouri Valley Conference {MVC} tournament
March 7, 2014*; 2:35 pm	(5)	vs. (4) Missouri State; Quarterfinal	L 48–53	16–15	25 – Lofton	8 – Lynch	3 – Wills	Scottrade Center (10,260); St. Louis, MO
College Basketball Invitational {CBI}
March 19, 2014*; 7:05 pm		Morehead State [First Round]	W 77–67	17–15	18 – Knight	8 – Lynch	3 – Wills	Doug Collins Court at Redbird Arena (2,080); Normal, IL
March 24, 2014*; 8:05 pm, CBSSN		Texas A&M [Quarterfinal]	W 62–55	18–15	17 – Knight	9 – Knight	5 – Hunter	Doug Collins Court at Redbird Arena (3,251); Normal, IL
March 26, 2014*; 6:00 pm		at Siena [Semifinal]	L 49–61	18–16	15 – Lynch	7 – Lynch	2 – Keane, Lee	Times Union Center (3,980); Albany, NY
*Non-conference game. ^{#}Rankings from AP Poll. (#) Tournament seedings in parentheses. All times are in Central Time.
