= 2013–14 Loyola Ramblers men's basketball team =

American college basketball season

2013–14 Loyola Ramblers men's basketball
- Conference: Missouri Valley Conference
- Record: 10–22 (4–14 The Valley)
- Head coach: Porter Moser (3rd season)
- Assistant coaches: Daniyal Robinson; Emanuel Dildy; Matt Gordon
- Home arena: Joseph J. Gentile Arena

2013–14 Missouri Valley Conference men's basketball standings
| | Conf. | | | | Overall |
| Team | W | | L | PCT | W | | L | PCT |
|---|---|---|---|---|---|---|---|---|
| No. 2 Wichita State † | 18 | – | 0 | 1.000 | 35 | – | 1 | .972 |
| Indiana State | 12 | – | 6 | .667 | 23 | – | 11 | .676 |
| Northern Iowa | 10 | – | 8 | .556 | 16 | – | 15 | .516 |
| Missouri State | 9 | – | 9 | .500 | 20 | – | 13 | .606 |
| Illinois State | 9 | – | 9 | .500 | 18 | – | 16 | .529 |
| Southern Illinois | 9 | – | 9 | .500 | 14 | – | 19 | .424 |
| Bradley | 7 | – | 11 | .389 | 12 | – | 20 | .375 |
| Drake | 6 | – | 12 | .333 | 15 | – | 16 | .484 |
| Evansville | 6 | – | 12 | .333 | 14 | – | 19 | .424 |
| Loyola Chicago | 4 | – | 14 | .222 | 10 | – | 22 | .313 |
† 2014 MVC tournament winner Rankings from AP poll

The 2013–14 Loyola Ramblers men's basketball team represented Loyola University Chicago during the 2013–14 NCAA Division I men's basketball season. The Ramblers, led by third year head coach Porter Moser, played their home games at the Joseph J. Gentile Arena and were first year members of the Missouri Valley Conference. They finished the season 10–22, 4–14 in MVC play to finish in last place. They advanced to the quarterfinals of the Missouri Valley tournament where they lost to Indiana State.

== Roster ==
| Number | Name | Position | Height | Weight | Year | Hometown |
|---|---|---|---|---|---|---|
| 2 | Jordan Pickett | Guard | 6–0 | 165 | Freshman | Indianapolis, Indiana |
| 4 | Devon Turk | Guard | 6–4 | 170 | Sophomore | Houston, Texas |
| 5 | Joe Crisman | Guard | 6–4 | 195 | Junior | Munster, Indiana |
| 10 | Cody Johnson | Center | 6–10 | 245 | Sophomore | Draper, Utah |
| 13 | London Dokubo | Guard | 6–0 | 165 | Junior | Schaumburg, Illinois |
| 22 | Matt O'Leary | Forward | 6–8 | 210 | Sophomore | Terre Haute, Indiana |
| 23 | Jeff White | Guard | 6–1 | 160 | Sophomore | Peoria, Illinois |
| 25 | Nick Osborne | Forward | 6–8 | 220 | Sohpomore | Muncie, Indiana |
| 30 | Tanner Williams | Forward | 6–7 | 205 | Sophomore | Orion, Illinois |
| 32 | Christian Thomas | Guard/Forward | 6–5 | 207 | Junior | St. Louis, Missouri |
| 33 | Jeremy King | Center | 6–10 | 209 | Freshman | Houston, Texas |
| 34 | Cal Kennedy | Forward | 6–6 | 193 | Freshman | Oak Lawn, Illinois |
| 35 | Milton Doyle | Guard | 6–4 | 170 | Freshman | Chicago, Illinois |
| 44 | Derrick Boone | Guard | 6–3 | 180 | Senior | Minneapolis, Minnesota |
| 45 | Bill Clark | Guard | 6–4 | 207 | Senior | Valparaiso, Indiana |
| 52 | Tony Nixon | Guard | 6–4 | 207 | Senior | Chicago, Illinois |

== Schedule ==
| Date time, TV | Opponent | Result | Record | Site (attendance) city, state |
Exhibition
| 11/02/2013*; 3:00 pm | Lewis | L 70–82 | | Joseph J. Gentile Arena (1,278); Chicago, IL |
Regular season
| 11/08/2013*; 7:00 pm | Milwaukee | W 76–72 | 1–0 | Joseph J. Gentile Arena (2,247); Chicago, IL |
| 11/12/2013*; 7:00 pm | at Tennessee Tech | L 69–74 | 1–1 | Eblen Center (1,185); Cookeville, TN |
| 11/16/2013*; 2:00 pm | at Tulane | L 59–69 | 1–2 | Devlin Fieldhouse (1,552); New Orleans, LA |
| 11/19/2013*; 7:00 pm | Rockhurst | W 83–65 | 2–2 | Joseph J. Gentile Arena (1,364); Chicago, IL |
| 11/22/2013*; 7:30 pm | at Portland State; Portland State Tournament | L 63–67 | 2–3 | Stott Center (755); Portland, OR |
| 11/23/2013*; 5:00 pm | vs. UC Davis; Portland State Tournament | L 61–64 ^{OT} | 2–4 | Stott Center (834); Portland, OR |
| 11/24/2013*; 2:00 pm | vs. SIU Edwardsville; Portland State Tournament | W 73–72 | 3–4 | Stott Center (738); Portland, OR |
| 12/01/2013*; 12:00 pm | at Mississippi State | L 64–65 ^{OT} | 3–5 | Humphrey Coliseum (6,010); Starkville, MS |
| 12/07/2013*; 3:00 pm | UIC | W 73–70 | 4–5 | Joseph J. Gentile Arena (2,017); Chicago, IL |
| 12/13/2013*; 7:00 pm | Campbell | W 80–68 | 5–5 | Joseph J. Gentile Arena (1,103); Chicago, IL |
| 12/18/2013*; 7:00 pm | Northern Illinois | L 49–55 | 5–6 | Joseph J. Gentile Arena (1,517); Chicago, IL |
| 12/23/2013*; 3:00 pm | at Fordham | L 69–83 | 5–7 | Rose Hill Gymnasium (2,959); Bronx, NY |
| 01/01/2014; 2:00 pm | at Indiana State | L 58–70 | 5–8 (0–1) | Hulman Center (5,266); Terre Haute, IN |
| 01/05/2014; 3:00 pm | Missouri State | W 89–57 | 6–8 (1–1) | Joseph J. Gentile Arena (1,024); Chicago, IL |
| 01/08/2014; 7:00 pm, CSN Chicago | Southern Illinois | L 67–71 | 6–9 (1–2) | Joseph J. Gentile Arena (1,623); Chicago, IL |
| 01/11/2014; 7:00 pm, CSN Chicago | at Illinois State | L 50–59 | 6–10 (1–3) | Redbird Arena (5,354); Normal, IL |
| 01/15/2014; 7:00 pm | Drake | W 70–60 | 7–10 (2–3) | Joseph J. Gentile Arena (1,702); Chicago, IL |
| 01/18/2014; 1:00 pm | at Evansville | L 48–53 | 7–11 (2–4) | Ford Center (4,310); Evansville, IN |
| 01/22/2014; 7:00 pm | Indiana State | L 61–65 | 7–12 (2–5) | Joseph J. Gentile Arena (1,180); Chicago, IL |
| 01/25/2014; 3:00 pm | Northern Iowa | W 93–87 ^{OT} | 8–12 (3–5) | Joseph J. Gentile Arena (2,723); Chicago, IL |
| 01/28/2014; 7:00 pm | at No. 4 Wichita State | L 45–57 | 8–13 (3–6) | Charles Koch Arena (10,506); Wichita, KS |
| 02/01/2014; 3:00 pm | at Southern Illinois | L 76–81 ^{OT} | 8–14 (3–7) | SIU Arena (5,156); Carbondale, IL |
| 02/06/2014; 7:00 pm, ESPN3 | Bradley | L 54–63 | 8–15 (3–8) | Joseph J. Gentile Arena (1,870); Chicago, IL |
| 02/09/2014; 3:00 pm, ESPN3 | Illinois State | W 79–69 | 9–15 (4–8) | Joseph J. Gentile Arena (2,664); Chicago, IL |
| 02/12/2014; 7:00 pm | at Northern Iowa | L 58–80 | 9–16 (4–9) | McLeod Center (3,532); Cedar Falls, IA |
| 02/15/2014; 7:00 pm | at Drake | L 62–70 | 9–17 (4–10) | Knapp Center (4,292); Des Moines, IA |
| 02/19/2014; 7:00 pm | No. 3 Wichita State | L 74–88 | 9–18 (4–12) | Joseph J. Gentile Arena (4,577); Chicago, IL |
| 02/22/2014; 7:00 pm, CSN Chicago | at Bradley | L 38–55 | 9–19 (4–13) | Carver Arena (8,931); Peoria, IL |
| 02/25/2014; 7:00 pm | at Missouri State | L 56–72 | 9–20 (4–13) | JQH Arena (5,455); Springfield, MO |
| 03/01/2014; 3:00 pm | Evansville | L 72–75 | 9–21 (4–14) | Joseph J. Gentile Arena (1,382); Chicago, IL |
2014 Missouri Valley tournament
| 03/06/2014; 8:35 pm, MVCTV | vs. Bradley; First round | W 74–72 | 10–21 | Scottrade Center (5,601); St.Louis, MO |
| 03/07/2014; 7:00 pm, MVCTV | vs. Indiana State; Quarterfinals | L 62–75 | 10–22 | Scottrade Center (9,037); St. Louis, MO |
*Non-conference game. ^{#}Rankings from Coaches' Poll. (#) Tournament seedings in parentheses. All times are in Central Time.
