= 2013–14 Southern Illinois Salukis men's basketball team =

American college basketball season

2013–14 Southern Illinois Salukis men's basketball
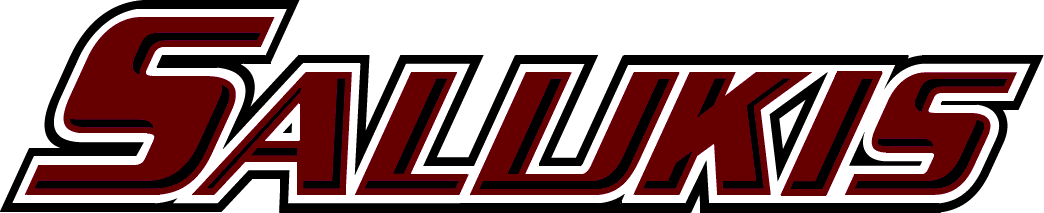
- Conference: Missouri Valley Conference
- Record: 14–19 (9–9 The Valley)
- Head coach: Barry Hinson (2nd season)
- Assistant coaches: Tom Hankins; Anthony Beane, Sr.; Terrance McGee
- Home arena: SIU Arena

2013–14 Missouri Valley Conference men's basketball standings
	Conf.				Overall
Team	W		L	PCT	W		L	PCT
No. 2 Wichita State †	18	–	0	1.000	35	–	1	.972
Indiana State	12	–	6	.667	23	–	11	.676
Northern Iowa	10	–	8	.556	16	–	15	.516
Missouri State	9	–	9	.500	20	–	13	.606
Illinois State	9	–	9	.500	18	–	16	.529
Southern Illinois	9	–	9	.500	14	–	19	.424
Bradley	7	–	11	.389	12	–	20	.375
Drake	6	–	12	.333	15	–	16	.484
Evansville	6	–	12	.333	14	–	19	.424
Loyola Chicago	4	–	14	.222	10	–	22	.313
† 2014 MVC tournament winner Rankings from AP poll

The 2013–14 Southern Illinois Salukis men's basketball team represented Southern Illinois University Carbondale during the 2013–14 NCAA Division I men's basketball season. The Salukis, led by second year head coach Barry Hinson, played their home games at the SIU Arena and were members of the Missouri Valley Conference. They finished the season 14–19, 9–9 in MVC play to finish in a three way tie for fourth place. They advanced to the semifinals of the Missouri Valley tournament where they lost to Indiana State.

== Roster ==
Number	Name	Position	Height	Weight	Year	Hometown
0	Mike Balogun	Guard	6–1	180	Junior	Staten Island, New York
1	Jalen Pendleton	Guard	6–2	201	Sophomore	Evansville, Indiana
2	KC Goodwin	Guard	5–10	160	Freshman	Memphis, Tennessee
3	Desmar Jackson	Guard	6–5	173	Senior	Warren, Ohio
4	Davante Drinkard	Forward	6–9	234	Senior	Toccoa, Georgia
10	Ibby Djimde	Center	6–8	245	Junior	Bamako, Mali
11	Colby Long	Guard	5–11	170	Senior	Mt. Zion, Illinois
12	Marcus Fillyaw	Guard	6–1	180	Sophomore	Topeka, Kansas
15	Hunter Gibson	Guard	6–4	190	Sophomore	Bethany, Oklahoma
20	Tyler Smithpeters	Guard	6–4	180	Freshman	Harrisburg, Illinois
22	Bronson Verhines	Forward	6–6	195	Senior	Woodlawn, Illinois
23	Bola Olaniyan	Forward	6–7	219	Freshman	Lagos, Nigeria
24	Dawson Verhines	Guard	6–3	195	Junior	Woodlawn, Illinois
25	Anthony Beane, Jr.	Guard	6–2	171	Sophomore	Normal, Illinois
33	Sean O'Brien	Guard	6–6	195	Freshman	Chicago, Illinois

== Schedule ==
Date time, TV	Opponent	Result	Record	Site (attendance) city, state
Exhibition
11/02/2013*; 7:05 pm	Missouri–St. Louis	W 71–66		SIU Arena (4,165); Carbondale, IL
11/09/2013*; 7:05 pm	William Jewell	W 78–66		SIU Arena (4,287); Carbondale, IL
Regular season
11/12/2013*; 8:00 pm, FS Midwest/ESPN3	at Missouri	L 59–72	0–1	Mizzou Arena (6,794); Columbia, MO
11/16/2013*; 7:05 pm	Saint Louis	L 67–76	0–2	SIU Arena (5,640); Carbondale, IL
11/19/2013*; 7:05 pm	at Austin Peay	L 70–72	0–3	Dunn Center (2,505); Clarksville, TN
11/21/2013*; 7:05 pm	Missouri S&T; Gulf Coast Showcase	W 96–74	1–3	SIU Arena (3,924); Carbondale, IL
11/25/2013*; 7:30 pm	vs. St. Bonaventure; Gulf Coast Showcase	L 71–83	1–4	Germain Arena (487); Estero, FL
11/26/2013*; 1:30 pm	vs. Stetson; Gulf Coast Showcase	W 67–48	2–4	Germain Arena (N/A); Estero, FL
11/27/2013*; 1:30 pm	vs. San Diego; Gulf Coast Showcase	L 56–59	2–5	Germain Arena (N/A); Estero, FL
11/30/2013*; 2:05 pm	at Chicago State	L 84–88	2–6	Jones Convocation Center (1,347); Chicago, IL
12/07/2013*; 3:05 pm, ESPN3	WKU	L 60–69	2–7	SIU Arena (4,164); Carbondale, IL
12/17/2013*; 7:00 pm	at Murray State	L 65–73	2–8	CFSB Center (3,389); Murray, KY
12/21/2013*; 2:05 pm	Ball State	W 66–58	3–8	SIU Arena (4,223); Carbondale, IL
12/23/2013*; 7:05 pm	SIU Edwardsville	W 74–57	4–8	SIU Arena (7,057); Carbondale, IL
12/29/2013*; 2:30 pm	at Miami (OH)	L 65–67	4–9	Millett Hall; Oxford, OH
01/02/2014; 7:05 pm, ESPN3	No. 8 Wichita State	L 67–82	4–10 (0–1)	SIU Arena (4,891); Carbondale, IL
01/05/2014; 1:00 pm	at Illinois State	L 48–66	4–11 (0–2)	Redbird Arena (1,060); Normal, IL
01/08/2014; 7:00 pm, MVCTV	at Loyola–Chicago	W 71–67	5–11 (1–2)	Joseph J. Gentile Arena (1,623); Chicago, IL
01/11/2014; 3:05 pm	Evansville	L 69–75	5–12 (1–3)	SIU Arena (4,763); Carbondale, IL
01/14/2014; 7:05 pm	Northern Iowa	W 68–66	6–12 (2–3)	SIU Arena (4,278); Carbondale, IL
01/17/2014; 7:00 pm	at Bradley	L 60–66	6–13 (2–4)	Carver Arena (6,909); Peoria, IL
01/22/2014; 7:05 pm	Drake	L 54–57	6–14 (2–5)	SIU Arena (4,532); Carbondale, IL
01/25/2014; 7:00 pm, MVCTV	at Missouri State	L 63–69	6–15 (2–6)	JQH Arena (6,206); Springfield, MO
01/29/2014; 7:05 pm	Indiana State	W 79–60	7–15 (3–6)	SIU Arena (4,821); Carbondale, IL
02/01/2014; 3:05 pm	Loyola–Chicago	W 81–76 ^{OT}	8–15 (4–6)	SIU Arena (5,156); Carbondale, IL
02/04/2014; 7:05 pm	at Drake	W 74–58	9–15 (5–6)	Knapp Center (3,354); Des Moines, IA
02/08/2014; 6:00 pm, MVCTV	Missouri State	W 72–54	10–15 (6–6)	SIU Arena (6,249); Carbondale, IL
02/11/2014; 7:00 pm	at No. 4 Wichita State	L 67–78	10–16 (6–7)	Charles Koch Arena (10,506); Wichita, KS
02/15/2014; 12:05 pm	at Indiana State	L 57–60	10–17 (6–8)	Hulman Center (5,420); Terre Haute, IN
02/18/2014; 7:05 pm	Bradley	W 75–64	11–17 (7–8)	SIU Arena (5,089); Carbondale, IL
02/22/2014; 7:05 pm	at Evansville	W 61–56	12–17 (8–8)	Ford Center (6,243); Evansville, IN
02/26/2014; 7:00 pm	at Northern Iowa	L 54–73	12–18 (8–9)	McLeod Center (3,804); Cedar Falls, IA
03/01/2014; 3:00 pm, CSN Chicago, ESPN3	Illinois State	W 66–65	13–18 (9–9)	SIU Arena (8,339); Carbondale, IL
2014 Missouri Valley tournament
03/07/2014; 8:35 pm, MVCTV	vs. Northern Iowa; Quarterfinals	W 63–58	14–18	Scottrade Center (9,037); St.Louis, MO
03/08/2014; 8:35 pm, MVCTV	vs. Indiana State; Semifinals	L 59–62	14–19	Scottrade Center (13,966); St.Louis, MO
*Non-conference game. ^{#}Rankings from AP Poll. (#) Tournament seedings in parentheses. All times are in Central Time.
