= 2013–14 Northern Iowa Panthers men's basketball team =

American college basketball season

2013–14 Northern Iowa Panthers men's basketball
- Conference: Missouri Valley Conference
- Record: 16–15 (10–8 The Valley)
- Head coach: Ben Jacobson (8th season)
- Assistant coaches: Erik Crawford; Kyle Green; P.J. Hogan
- Home arena: McLeod Center

2013–14 Missouri Valley Conference men's basketball standings
	Conf.				Overall
Team	W		L	PCT	W		L	PCT
No. 2 Wichita State †	18	–	0	1.000	35	–	1	.972
Indiana State	12	–	6	.667	23	–	11	.676
Northern Iowa	10	–	8	.556	16	–	15	.516
Missouri State	9	–	9	.500	20	–	13	.606
Illinois State	9	–	9	.500	18	–	16	.529
Southern Illinois	9	–	9	.500	14	–	19	.424
Bradley	7	–	11	.389	12	–	20	.375
Drake	6	–	12	.333	15	–	16	.484
Evansville	6	–	12	.333	14	–	19	.424
Loyola Chicago	4	–	14	.222	10	–	22	.313
† 2014 MVC tournament winner Rankings from AP poll

The 2013–14 Northern Iowa Panthers men's basketball team represented the University of Northern Iowa during the 2013–14 NCAA Division I men's basketball season. The Panthers, led by eighth year head coach Ben Jacobson, played their home games at McLeod Center and were members of the Missouri Valley Conference. They last played in the Missouri Valley Tournament where they lost to the Southern Illinois Salukis in the quarterfinals

== Roster ==
Number	Name	Position	Height	Weight	Year	Hometown
1	Deon Mitchell	Guard	6–1	194	Junior	Pflugerville, Texas
2	Klint Carlson	Forward	6–7	220	Freshman	Waverly, Iowa
3	Ted Friedman	Center	6–9	230	Freshman	Ankeny, Iowa
4	Chip Rank	Forward	6–6	235	Senior	Cedarburg, Wisconsin
5	Matt Bohannon	Guard	6–4	210	Sophomore	Marion, Iowa
10	Seth Tuttle	Forward	6–8	221	Junior	Sheffield, Iowa
11	Wes Washpun	Guard	6–1	170	Sophomore	Cedar Rapids, Iowa
12	Marvin Singleton	Forward	6–6	245	Junior	Minneapolis, Minnesota
14	Nate Buss	Forward	6–9	216	Junior	Charles City, Iowa
15	Nate Buchheit	Guard	6–4	190	Junior	Pella, Iowa
20	Jeremy Morgan	Guard	6–5	185	Freshman	Coralville, Iowa
21	Matt Morrison	Guard	6–0	180	Senior	Solon, Iowa
22	Robert Knar	Guard	6–1	175	Freshman	Mundelein, Illinois
24	Max Martino	Guard	6–5	210	Junior	Cedar Rapids, Iowa
25	Bennett Koch	Forward	6–9	210	Freshman	Ashwaubenon, Wisconsin
32	Matt MacDougall	Guard	6–4	175	RFreshman	Cedar Rapids, Iowa
	Paul Jesperson	Guard	6–6	215	Junior	Merrill, Wisconsin
	Kasey Semler	Guard	6–1	205	Junior	Cedar Rapids, Iowa

== Schedule ==
Date time, TV	Rank^{#}	Opponent^{#}	Result	Record	Site (attendance) city, state
Exhibition
10/25/2013*; 7:00 pm		Bemidji State	W 71–48		McLeod Center (3,120); Cedar Falls, IA
11/01/2013*; 7:00 pm		Dubuque	W 85–66		McLeod Center (3,278); Cedar Falls, IA
Regular season
11/09/2013*; 1:00 pm		at Ohio	L 64–75	0–1	Convocation Center (11,162); Athens, OH
11/11/2013*; 7:00 pm		Coe	W 86–52	1–1	McLeod Center (3,658); Cedar Falls, IA
11/16/2013*; 3:00 pm		at George Mason	L 70–76	1–2	Patriot Center (4,136); Fairfax, VA
11/22/2013*; 12:30 pm, CBSSN		vs. Loyola Marymount; Paradise Jam tournament	W 90–81	2–2	Sports and Fitness Center (1,527); Saint Thomas, U.S. Virgin Islands
11/24/2013*; 6:00 pm, CBSSN		vs. Maryland; Paradise Jam Tournament	L 66–80	2–3	Sports and Fitness Center (1,766); Saint Thomas, U.S. Virgin Islands
11/25/2013*; 6:30 pm, CBSSN		vs. La Salle; Paradise Jam Tournament	W 65–50	3–3	Sports and Fitness Center (2,655); Saint Thomas, U.S. Virgin Islands
12/03/2013*; 7:00 pm		at Milwaukee	L 72–83	3–4	Klotsche Center (2,632); Milwaukee, WI
12/07/2013*; 5:00 pm		vs. No. 17 Iowa State; Big Four Classic	L 82–91 ^{OT}	3–5	Wells Fargo Arena (14,512); Des Moines, IA
12/10/2013*; 7:00 pm		Savannah State	W 55–50	4–5	McLeod Center (3,145); Cedar Falls, IA
12/14/2013*; 11:00 am, ESPNU		VCU	W 77–68	5–5	McLeod Center (5,890); Cedar Falls, IA
12/21/2013*; 3:00 pm, ESPN3		at Virginia	L 43–57	5–6	John Paul Jones Arena (9,714); Charlottesville, VA
12/28/2013*; 7:00 pm		Iona	W 90–78	6–6	McLeod Center (5,218); Cedar Falls, IA
01/01/2014; 7:00 pm		Bradley	W 80–46	7–6 (1–0)	McLeod Center (4,132); Cedar Falls, IA
01/05/2014; 1:00 pm		at No. 8 Wichita State	L 53–67	7–7 (1–1)	Charles Koch Arena (10,506); Wichita, KS
01/08/2014; 7:00 pm		at Evansville	W 80–53	8–7 (2–1)	Ford Center (3,222); Evansville, IN
01/11/2014; 7:00 pm		Drake	W 76–66	9–7 (3–1)	McLeod Center (6,072); Cedar Falls, IA
01/14/2014; 7:00 pm		at Southern Illinois	L 66–68	9–8 (3–2)	SIU Arena (4,278); Carbondale, IL
01/18/2014; 12:00 pm, ESPNU		Missouri State	W 94–89	10–8 (4–2)	McLeod Center (5,232); Cedar Falls, IA
01/22/2014; 7:00 pm		at Bradley	L 65–69	10–9 (4–3)	Carver Arena (6,585); Peoria, IL
01/25/2014; 3:00 pm		at Loyola–Chicago	L 87–93 ^{OT}	10–10 (4–4)	Joseph J. Gentile Arena (2,723); Chicago, IL
01/29/2014; 7:00 pm, ESPN3		Evansville	W 95–81	11–10 (5–4)	McLeod Center (3,670); Cedar Falls, IA
02/01/2014; 7:00 pm, ESPN3		Indiana State	L 81–87	11–11 (5–5)	McLeod Center (5,127); Cedar Falls, IA
02/05/2014; 7:00 pm		at Illinois State	L 65–76	11–12 (5–6)	Redbird Arena (4,021); Normal, IL
02/08/2014; 8:00 pm, ESPN2		No. 4 Wichita State	L 73–82	11–13 (5–7)	McLeod Center (7,150); Cedar Falls, IA
02/12/2014; 7:00 pm		Loyola–Chicago	W 80–58	12–13 (6–7)	McLeod Center (3,532); Cedar Falls, IA
02/15/2014; 8:00 pm, ESPNU		at Missouri State	W 60–58	13–13 (7–7)	JQH Arena (6,314); Springfield, MO
02/18/2014; 8:00 pm		at Drake	L 67–70	13–14 (7–8)	Knapp Center (4,285); Des Moines, IA
02/23/2014; 4:00 pm		Illinois State	W 72–59	14–14 (8–8)	McLeod Center (4,385); Cedar Falls, IA
02/26/2014; 7:00 pm		Southern Illinois	W 73–54	15–14 (9–8)	McLeod Center (3,804); Cedar Falls, IA
03/01/2014; 12:00 pm, ESPNU		at Indiana State	W 71–69	16–14 (10–8)	Hulman Center (5,717); Terre Haute, IN
2014 Missouri Valley tournament
03/07/2014; 8:35 pm, MVCTV		vs. Southern Illinois; Quarterfinals	L 58–63	16–15	Scottrade Center (9,037); St.Louis, MO
*Non-conference game. ^{#}Rankings from AP Poll. (#) Tournament seedings in parentheses. All times are in Central Time.
