= 2013–14 Bradley Braves men's basketball team =

American college basketball season

2013–14 Bradley Braves men's basketball
- Conference: Missouri Valley Conference
- Record: 12–20 (7–11 The Valley)
- Head coach: Geno Ford (3rd season)
- Assistant coaches: Ronald Coleman; Greg Graham; Jaden Uken
- Home arena: Carver Arena; Renaissance Coliseum

2013–14 Missouri Valley Conference men's basketball standings
	Conf.				Overall
Team	W		L	PCT	W		L	PCT
No. 2 Wichita State †	18	–	0	1.000	35	–	1	.972
Indiana State	12	–	6	.667	23	–	11	.676
Northern Iowa	10	–	8	.556	16	–	15	.516
Missouri State	9	–	9	.500	20	–	13	.606
Illinois State	9	–	9	.500	18	–	16	.529
Southern Illinois	9	–	9	.500	14	–	19	.424
Bradley	7	–	11	.389	12	–	20	.375
Drake	6	–	12	.333	15	–	16	.484
Evansville	6	–	12	.333	14	–	19	.424
Loyola Chicago	4	–	14	.222	10	–	22	.313
† 2014 MVC tournament winner Rankings from AP poll

The 2013–14 Bradley Braves men's basketball team represented Bradley University during the 2013–14 NCAA Division I men's basketball season. The Braves, led by third year head coach Geno Ford, played their home games at Carver Arena and Renaissance Coliseumain Peoria, Illinoisnd were members of the Missouri Valley Conference. They finished the season 12–20, 7–11 in MVC play to finish in seventh place. They lost in the first round of the Missouri Valley tournament to Loyola–Chicago.

== Roster ==
Number	Name	Position	Height	Weight	Year	Hometown
0	Ka'Darryl Bell	Guard	6–1	195	Sophomore	Chicago, Illinois
1	Johnah Sarhrs	Guard			Freshman	Edwards, Illinois
3	Anthony Fields	Guard	6–0	160	Sophomore	Detroit, Michigan
4	Auston Barnes	Forward	6–8	215	Junior	Lansing, Michigan
10	Mason Alwan	Guard	6–2	200	Senior	Peoria, Illinois
12	Darrion Harris	Guard	5–10	155	Sophomore	St. Louis, Missouri
13	Jordan Swopshire	Forward	6–6	205	Freshman	O'Fallon, Missouri
20	Tyshon Pickett	Forward	6–6	230	Senior	Passaic, New Jersey
21	Mike Shaw	Forward	6–8	230	Junior	Chicago, Illinois
22	Xzavier Taylor	Forward/Center	6–9	225	Sophomore	Chicago, Illinois
24	Omari Grier	Guard	6–4	180	Sophomore	Erial, New Jersey
25	Walt Lemon, Jr.	Guard	6–3	180	Senior	Chicago, Illinois
32	Jarret Sahrs	Guard			Freshman	Edwards, Illinois
34	Stefan Zacevic	Guard	6–6	200	Freshman	Kragujevac, Serbia
35	Chris Blake	Forward	6–7	215	Junior	San Antonio, Texas
44	Jordan Prosser	Center	6–8	245	Senior	Goodfield, Illinois
52	Nate Wells	Center	7–1	260	Sophomore	Davenport, Iowa

== Schedule ==
Date time, TV	Opponent	Result	Record	Site (attendance) city, state
Summer exhibition
08/12/2013*; 6:00 pm	vs. Commonwealth Bank Giants; Summer of Thunder Classic	L 74–77		Sir Kendal Isaacs Gymnasium; Nassau, Bahamas
08/13/2013*; 8:00 pm	vs. Real Deal Shockers; Summer of Thunder Classic	W 74–66		Sir Kendal Isaacs Gymnasium; Nassau, Bahamas
08/14/2013*; 8:00 pm	vs. PJ Stingers; Summer of Thunder Classic	W 96–70		Sir Kendal Isaacs Gymnasium; Nassau, Bahamas
08/15/2013*; 6:00 pm	vs. Mail Boat Cybots; Summer of Thunder Classic	W 90–55		Sir Kendal Isaacs Gymnasium; Nassau, Bahamas
Exhibition
10/28/2013*; 7:00 pm	Upper Iowa	W 85–83		Renaissance Coliseum (3,085); Peoria, IL
11/02/2013*; 1:00 pm	West Virginia Wesleyan	W 70–60		Carver Arena (6,591); Peoria, IL
Non-conference regular season
11/08/2013*; 7:00 pm	Jacksonville State; Global Sports Invitational	W 72–65	1–0	Carver Arena (7,209); Peoria, IL
11/10/2013*; 4:00 pm	Alabama State; Global Sports Invitational	W 85–59	2–0	Renaissance Coliseum (3,820); Peoria, IL
11/12/2013*; 7:00 pm	Central Michigan	W 80–70	3–0	Carver Arena (6,334); Peoria, IL
11/15/2013*; 7:00 pm	Chicago State; Global Sports Invitational	W 77–64	4–0	Carver Arena (6,797); Peoria, IL
11/17/2013*; 5:00 pm, BTDN	at Illinois; Global Sports Invitational	L 55–81	4–1	State Farm Center (15,849); Champaign, IL
11/22/2013*; 9:00 pm, Pac-12 Network	at Arizona State	L 58–70	4–2	Wells Fargo Arena (5,570); Tempe, AZ
11/30/2013*; 7:00 pm	Texas–Pan American	W 74–54	5–2	Carver Arena (5,898); Peoria, IL
12/04/2013*; 7:30 pm	IUPUI	L 66–72	5–3	Renaissance Coliseum (3,750); Peoria, IL
12/07/2013*; 3:00 pm	at Milwaukee	L 67–73	5–4	U.S. Cellular Arena (2,498); Milwaukee, WI
12/10/2013*; 7:00 pm	IPFW	L 61–65	5–5	Carver Arena (5,977); Peoria, IL
12/20/2013*; 7:00 pm	vs. Portland; South Point Holiday Hoops Classic	L 53–74	5–6	South Point Arena (N/A); Enterprise, NV
12/21/2013*; 7:30 pm	vs. Pacific; South Point Holiday Hoops Classic	L 55–71	5–7	South Point Arena (312); Enterprise, NV
12/28/2013*; 7:00 pm	South Florida	L 57–61	5–8	Carver Arena (6,221); Peoria, IL
Missouri Valley Conference regular season
01/01/2014; 7:00 pm, MVCTV	at Northern Iowa	L 46–80	5–9 (0–1)	McLeod Center (4,132); Cedar Falls, IA
01/04/2014; 7:00 pm	Drake	W 68–57	6–9 (1–1)	Carver Arena (6,465); Peoria, IL
01/08/2014; 7:00 pm	Missouri State	L 65–68	6–10 (1–2)	Carver Arena (5,745); Peoria, IL
01/11/2014; 12:00 pm	at Indiana State	L 59–62	6–11 (1–3)	Hulman Center (5,545); Terre Haute, IN
01/14/2014; 7:00 pm	at No. 5 Wichita State	L 50–72	6–12 (1–4)	Charles Koch Arena (10,506); Wichita, KS
01/17/2014; 7:00 pm	Southern Illinois	W 66–60	7–12 (2–4)	Carver Arena (6,909); Peoria, IL
01/22/2014; 7:00 pm	Northern Iowa	W 69–65	8–12 (3–4)	Carver Arena (6,585); Peoria, IL
01/26/2014; 1:00 pm, MVCTV	at Evansville	L 60–66	8–13 (3–5)	Ford Center (5,889); Evansville, IN
01/29/2014; 7:00 pm	Illinois State	W 64–45	9–13 (4–5)	Carver Arena (8,403); Peoria, IL
02/01/2014; 2:00 pm	at Missouri State	L 61–74	9–14 (4–6)	JQH Arena (6,174); Springfield, MO
02/06/2014; 7:00 pm, ESPN3	at Loyola–Chicago	W 63–54	10–14 (5–6)	Joseph J. Gentile Arena (1,870); Chicago, IL
02/09/2014; 3:00 pm	Evansville	W 83–66	11–14 (6–6)	Carver Arena (6,732); Peoria, IL
02/12/2014; 7:00 pm	Indiana State	L 62–68	11–15 (6–7)	Carver Arena (6,302); Peoria, IL
02/15/2014; 6:00 pm, MVCTV	at Illinois State	L 54–70	11–16 (6–8)	Redbird Arena (8,111); Normal, IL
02/18/2014; 7:00 pm	at Southern Illinois	L 64–75	11–17 (6–9)	SIU Arena (5,089); Carbondale, IL
02/22/2014; 7:00 pm, MVCTV	Loyola–Chicago	W 55–38	12–17 (7–9)	Carver Arena (8,931); Peoria, IL
02/25/2014; 7:00 pm, ESPN3	No. 2 Wichita State	L 49–69	12–18 (7–10)	Carver Arena (10,257); Peoria, IL
03/01/2014; 2:00 pm	at Drake	L 66–71	12–19 (7–11)	Knapp Center (4,122); Des Moines, IA
2014 Missouri Valley tournament
03/06/2014; 8:35 pm, MVCTV	vs. Loyola–Chicago; First round	L 72–74	12–20	Scottrade Center (5,601); St.Louis, MO
*Non-conference game. ^{#}Rankings from AP Poll. (#) Tournament seedings in parentheses. All times are in Central Time.
