= 2013–14 Drake Bulldogs men's basketball team =

American college basketball season

2013–14 Drake Bulldogs men's basketball
- Conference: Missouri Valley Conference
- Record: 15–16 (6–12 MVC)
- Head coach: Ray Giacoletti (1st season)
- Assistant coaches: Jeff Rutter; Todd Townsend; Bill Walker
- Home arena: Knapp Center

2013–14 Missouri Valley Conference men's basketball standings
	Conf.				Overall
Team	W		L	PCT	W		L	PCT
No. 2 Wichita State †	18	–	0	1.000	35	–	1	.972
Indiana State	12	–	6	.667	23	–	11	.676
Northern Iowa	10	–	8	.556	16	–	15	.516
Missouri State	9	–	9	.500	20	–	13	.606
Illinois State	9	–	9	.500	18	–	16	.529
Southern Illinois	9	–	9	.500	14	–	19	.424
Bradley	7	–	11	.389	12	–	20	.375
Drake	6	–	12	.333	15	–	16	.484
Evansville	6	–	12	.333	14	–	19	.424
Loyola Chicago	4	–	14	.222	10	–	22	.313
† 2014 MVC tournament winner Rankings from AP poll

The 2013–14 Drake Bulldogs men's basketball team represented Drake University during the 2013–14 NCAA Division I men's basketball season. The Bulldogs, led by first year head coach Ray Giacoletti, played their home games at the Knapp Center and were members of the Missouri Valley Conference. They finished the season 15–16, 6–12 in MVC play to finish in a tie for eighth place. They lost in the first round of the Missouri Valley tournament to Evansville.

== Roster ==
Number	Name	Position	Height	Weight	Year	Hometown
1	Karl Madison	Guard	5–10	175	Junior	Springfield, Illinois
2	Gary Ricks, Jr.	Guard	6–1	182	Senior	Los Angeles, California
3	Richard Carter	Guard	5–11	177	Senior	Detroit, Michigan
4	Blake Danielak	Forward	6–7	190	Freshman	Georgetown, Texas
10	Trevor Berkeley	Forward	6–6	200	Junior	Tucker, Georgia
11	Jacob Jensen	Center	6–11	240	Freshman	Lunderskov, Denmark
12	Jordan Daniels	Guard	5–9	153	Sophomore	Fontana, California
21	Robert Puleikis	Center	6–10	221	Sophomore	Detroit, Michigan
23	Mitch McLaughlin	Guard	6–0	181	Sophomore	Cedar Rapids, Iowa
25	Chris Caird	Guard/Forward	6–6	215	Junior	Daventry, England
31	Aaron Hawley	Guard/Forward	6–8	197	Senior	Rogers, Arkansas
40	Daddy Ugbede	Forward	6–6	216	Sophomore	Gardena, California
45	Seth VanDeest	Center	6–11	269	Senior	Bettendorf, Iowa

== Schedule ==
Date time, TV	Opponent	Result	Record	Site (attendance) city, state
Exhibition
11/03/2013*; 2:00 pm	Central College	W 90–70		Knapp Center (3,135); Des Moines, IA
Regular season
11/09/2013*; 7:00 pm, CSN Chicago	at UIC	W 61–59	1–0	UIC Pavilion (5,245); Chicago, IL
11/12/2013*; 7:00 pm, MC22	Iowa Wesleyan	W 104–49	2–0	Knapp Center (3,256); Des Moines, IA
11/16/2013*; 9:00 pm	at Saint Mary's	L 63–67	2–1	McKeon Pavilion (2,495); Moraga, CA
11/23/2013*; 1:00 pm	Nebraska–Omaha	W 88–80	3–1	Knapp Center (3,256); Des Moines, IA
11/29/2013*; 9:00 pm	at Fresno State; Fresno State Classic	W 84–74	4–1	Save Mart Center (6,170); Fresno, CA
11/30/2013*; 6:30 pm	vs. Northern Arizona; Fresno State Classic	W 76–56	5–1	Save Mart Center (6,022); Fresno, CA
12/01/2013*; 1:00 pm	vs. Cal State Bakersfield; Fresno State Classic	W 65–57	6–1	Save Mart Center (5,807); Fresno, CA
12/07/2013*; 7:30 pm, MC22	vs. No. 23 Iowa; Big Four Classic	L 66–83	6–2	Wells Fargo Arena (14,512); Des Moines, IA
12/14/2013*; 7:00 pm	New Mexico State	L 69–81 ^{OT}	6–3	Knapp Center (3,288); Des Moines, IA
12/18/2013*; 7:00 pm	Western Michigan	W 71–68	7–3	Knapp Center (3,054); Des Moines, IA
12/23/2013*; 7:00 pm	Albany	W 71–63	8–3	Knapp Center (3,389); Des Moines, IA
12/29/2013*; 1:00 pm	IUPUI	W 75–52	9–3	IUPUI Gymnasium (583); Indianapolis, IN
01/01/2014; 7:00 pm	Evansville	W 94–66	10–3 (1–0)	Knapp Center (3,071); Des Moines, IA
01/04/2014; 7:00 pm	at Bradley	L 57–68	10–4 (1–1)	Carver Arena (6,465); Peoria, IL
01/08/2014; 7:00 pm	Indiana State	L 73–77	10–5 (1–2)	Knapp Center (3,465); Des Moines, IA
01/11/2014; 7:00 pm	at Northern Iowa	L 66–76	10–6 (1–3)	McLeod Center (6,072); Cedar Falls, IA
01/15/2014; 7:00 pm	at Loyola–Chicago	L 60–70	10–7 (1–4)	Joseph J. Gentile Arena (1,702); Chicago, IL
01/18/2014; 7:00 pm	Illinois State	L 63–77	10–8 (1–5)	Knapp Center (3,701); Des Moines, IA
01/22/2014; 7:00 pm	at Southern Illinois	W 57–54	11–8 (2–5)	SIU Arena (4,532); Carbondale, IL
01/25/2014; 7:00 pm	No. 5 Wichita State	L 61–78	11–9 (2–6)	Knapp Center (6,127); Des Moines, IA
01/29/2014; 7:00 pm	Missouri State	W 84–74	12–9 (3–6)	Knapp Center (3,290); Des Moines, IA
02/01/2014; 3:00 pm	at Illinois State	L 57–75	12–10 (3–7)	Redbird Arena (5,874); Normal, IL
02/04/2014; 7:00 pm	Southern Illinois	L 58–74	12–11 (3–8)	Knapp Center (3,354); Des Moines, IA
02/09/2014; 2:00 pm, FS Midwest	at Indiana State	L 56–60	12–12 (3–9)	Hulman Center (5,449); Terre Haute, IN
02/12/2014; 7:00 pm, ESPN3	at Missouri State	L 63–69	12–13 (3–10)	JQH Arena (5,674); Springfield, MO
02/15/2014; 7:00 pm	Loyola–Chicago	W 70–62	13–13 (4–10)	Knapp Center (4,292); Des Moines, IA
02/18/2014; 8:00 pm, FS Midwest	Northern Iowa	W 70–67	14–13 (5–10)	Knapp Center (4,285); Des Moines, IA
02/22/2014; 7:00 pm	at No. 3 Wichita State	L 54–83	14–14 (5–11)	Charles Koch Arena (10,506); Wichita, KS
02/25/2014; 7:00 pm	at Evansville	L 48–61	14–15 (5–12)	Ford Center (3,483); Evansville, IN
03/01/2014; 2:00 pm	Bradley	W 71–66	15–15 (6–12)	Knapp Center (4,122); Des Moines, IA
2014 Missouri Valley tournament
03/06/2014; 6:05 pm	vs. Evansville; First round	L 61–69	15–16	Scottrade Center (5,601); St.Louis, MO
*Non-conference game. ^{#}Rankings from AP Poll. (#) Tournament seedings in parentheses. All times are in Central Time.
