= 2013–14 Mid-American Conference men's basketball season =

- League: NCAA Division I
- Sport: Basketball
- Teams: 12

Regular season
- League champions: Western Michigan and Toledo
- Season MVP: Javon McCrea

Tournament
- Champions: Western Michigan
- Runners-up: Toledo
- Finals MVP: David Brown

Mid-American men's basketball seasons
- ← 2012–13 2014–15 →

2013–14 Mid-American Conference men's basketball standings
	Conf.				Overall
Team	W		L	PCT	W		L	PCT
East
Buffalo	13	–	5	.722	19	–	10	.655
Akron	12	–	6	.667	21	–	13	.618
Ohio	11	–	7	.611	25	–	12	.676
Miami	8	–	10	.444	13	–	18	.419
Kent State	7	–	11	.389	16	–	16	.500
Bowling Green	6	–	12	.333	12	–	20	.375
West
Toledo	14	–	4	.778	27	–	7	.794
Western Michigan †	14	–	4	.778	23	–	10	.697
Eastern Michigan	10	–	8	.556	22	–	15	.595
Northern Illinois	8	–	10	.444	15	–	17	.469
Central Michigan	3	–	15	.167	10	–	21	.323
Ball State	2	–	16	.111	5	–	25	.167
† 2014 MAC tournament winner

The 2013–14 Mid-American Conference men's basketball season began with practices in October 2013, followed by the start of the 2013–14 NCAA Division I men's basketball season in November. Conference play began in January 2014 and concluded in March 2014. Western Michigan and Toledo shared the regular season title with a conference record of 14–4. Top-seeded Western Michigan defeated Toledo in the MAC tournament final and represented the MAC in the NCAA tournament where they lost to Syracuse.

== Preseason awards ==
The preseason poll and league awards were announced by the league office on October 29, 2013.

=== Preseason men's basketball poll ===
(First place votes in parentheses)

==== East Division ====
1. Akron 143 (18)
2. Buffalo 120 (6)
3. Ohio 94
4. Kent State 91 (1)
5. Miami 42
6. Bowling Green 35

==== West Division ====
1. Toledo 149 (24)
2. Western Michigan 108
3. Eastern Michigan 101 (1)
4. Ball State 89
5. Central Michigan 50
6. Northern Illinois 28

==== Tournament champs ====
Akron (14), Toledo (7), Buffalo (1)

=== Honors ===
Honor	Recipient
Preseason All-MAC East	Javon McCrea, Buffalo
Preseason All-MAC East	Demetrius Treadwell, Akron
Preseason All-MAC East	Will Felder, Miami
Preseason All-MAC East	Will Regan, Buffalo
Preseason All-MAC East	Quincy Diggs, Akron
Preseason All-MAC West	Rian Pearson, Toledo
Preseason All-MAC West	Julius Brown, Toledo
Preseason All-MAC West	Shayne Whittington, Western Michigan
Preseason All-MAC West	Majok Majok, Ball State
Preseason All-MAC West	Glenn Bryant, Eastern Michigan

== Postseason ==
=== Postseason awards ===
1. Coach of the Year: Steve Hawkins, Western Michigan
2. Player of the Year: Javon McCrea, Buffalo
3. Freshman of the Year: Zavier Turner, Ball State
4. Defensive Player of the Year: Da’Shonte Riley, Eastern Michigan
5. Sixth Man of the Year: Jake Kretzer, Akron

=== Honors ===
Honor	Recipient
Postseason All-MAC First Team	Julius Brown, G, Toledo
Postseason All-MAC First Team	David Brown, G, Western Michigan
Postseason All-MAC First Team	Javon McCrea, F, Buffalo
Postseason All-MAC First Team	Demetrius Treadwell, F, Akron
Postseason All-MAC First Team	Shayne Whittington, F, Western Michigan
Postseason All-MAC Second Team	Quincy Diggs, G, Akron
Postseason All-MAC Second Team	Will Felder, F, Miami
Postseason All-MAC Second Team	Nick Kellogg, G, Ohio
Postseason All-MAC Second Team	Maurice Ndour, F, Ohio
Postseason All-MAC Second Team	Rian Pearson, G, Toledo
Postseason All-MAC Third Team	Justin Drummond, G, Toledo
Postseason All-MAC Third Team	Chris Fowler, G, Central Michigan
Postseason All-MAC Third Team	Richaun Holmes, F, Bowling Green
Postseason All-MAC Third Team	Majok Majok, F/C, Ball State
Postseason All-MAC Third Team	Karrington Ward, F, Eastern Michigan
Postseason All-MAC Honorable Mention	Kris Brewer, G, Kent Statee
Postseason All-MAC Honorable Mention	Josh Freelove, G, Buffalo
Postseason All-MAC Honorable Mention	Connor Tava, F, Western Michigan
Postseason All-MAC Honorable Mention	Jordan Threloff, C, Northern Illinois
Postseason All-MAC Honorable Mention	J.D. Weatherspoon, F, Toledo
All-MAC Freshman Team	Aaric Armstead, G, Northern Illinois
All-MAC Freshman Team	Shannon Evans, G, Buffalo
All-MAC Freshman Team	Tucker Haymond, G, Western Michigan
All-MAC Freshman Team	Zavier Turner, G, Ball State
All-MAC Freshman Team	Jonathan Williams, G, Toledo

== See also ==
- 2013–14 Mid-American Conference women's basketball season
