= 2013–14 Miami RedHawks men's basketball team =

American college basketball season

2013–14 Miami RedHawks men's basketball
- Conference: Mid-American Conference
- East Division
- Record: 13–18 (8–10 MAC)
- Head coach: John Cooper (2nd season)
- Assistant coaches: Rick Duckett; Sheldon Everett; Trey Meyer
- Home arena: Millett Hall

2013–14 Mid-American Conference men's basketball standings
	Conf.				Overall
Team	W		L	PCT	W		L	PCT
East
Buffalo	13	–	5	.722	19	–	10	.655
Akron	12	–	6	.667	21	–	13	.618
Ohio	11	–	7	.611	25	–	12	.676
Miami	8	–	10	.444	13	–	18	.419
Kent State	7	–	11	.389	16	–	16	.500
Bowling Green	6	–	12	.333	12	–	20	.375
West
Toledo	14	–	4	.778	27	–	7	.794
Western Michigan †	14	–	4	.778	23	–	10	.697
Eastern Michigan	10	–	8	.556	22	–	15	.595
Northern Illinois	8	–	10	.444	15	–	17	.469
Central Michigan	3	–	15	.167	10	–	21	.323
Ball State	2	–	16	.111	5	–	25	.167
† 2014 MAC tournament winner

The 2013–14 Miami RedHawks men's basketball team represented Miami University during the 2013–14 NCAA Division I men's basketball season. The RedHawks, led by second-year head coach John Cooper, played their home games at Millett Hall in Oxford, Ohio as members of the East Division of the Mid-American Conference (MAC). They finished the season 13–18, 8–10 in MAC play, to finish in fourth place in the East Division. They advanced to the second round of the MAC tournament where they lost to Ohio.

== Season ==
=== Preseason ===
Head coach John Cooper announced the RedHawks' full season schedule on September 3, 2013. The team's non-conference schedule was highlighted by trips to Notre Dame, Arizona State and Xavier, and a home game against Southern Illinois. For the conference slate, the RedHawks schedule home-and-home series with Akron, Bowling Green, Buffalo, Kent State, Ohio, Central Michigan, and Western Michigan, while visiting Ball State and Northern Illinois and playing host to Toledo and Eastern Michigan.

The RedHawks opened their season with one exhibition game against Division II opponent Northwood. Miami squeaked by with a close 76–71 win, with the Timberwolves nearly mounting a second-half comeback. Sophomore Willie Moore scored 16 points to lead the RedHawks.

== Roster ==
2013–14 Miami RedHawks men's basketball team
Players
Coaches

Pos.	#	Name	Height	Weight	Year	Previous school	Hometown
G	0	Geovonie McKnight	6 ft 3 in (1.91 m)	182 lb (83 kg)	So	Middletown HS	Middletown, OH
G	2	Quinten Rollins	6 ft 0 in (1.83 m)	179 lb (81 kg)	Sr	Wilmington HS	Wilmington, OH
G	3	Will Sullivan	6 ft 3 in (1.91 m)	188 lb (85 kg)	Jr	York HS	Elmhurst, IL
G	4	Reggie Johnson	6 ft 1 in (1.85 m)	201 lb (91 kg)	So	St. Joseph HS	Chicago, IL
G	5	Jaryd Eustace	6 ft 7 in (2.01 m)	187 lb (85 kg)	Fr	Brisbane Boys' School	Brisbane, Australia
F	10	Joshua Oswald	6 ft 7 in (2.01 m)	210 lb (95 kg)	Fr	Caulfield Grammar School	Melbourne, Australia
F	12	Bill Edwards	6 ft 6 in (1.98 m)	245 lb (111 kg)	RS Sr	Middletown HS; Penn State	Middletown, OH
G	13	Philip Bennett	6 ft 0 in (1.83 m)	165 lb (75 kg)	Sr	Talawanda HS	Oxford, OH
G	22	Willie Moore	6 ft 3 in (1.91 m)	198 lb (90 kg)	So	Aiken HS; Oregon	Cincinnati, OH
F	33	Will Felder	6 ft 7 in (2.01 m)	207 lb (94 kg)	RS Sr	Lutheran East HS	Cleveland, OH
F	35	Brian Oddo	6 ft 6 in (1.98 m)	205 lb (93 kg)	So	Providence Catholic HS	New Lenox, IL
C	40	John Hawkins	7 ft 0 in (2.13 m)	259 lb (117 kg)	RS So	Troy HS; Palm Beach Atlantic	Troy, MI
F/C	41	Blake McLimans	6 ft 10 in (2.08 m)	40 lb (18 kg)	RS Sr	Worcester Academy	Hamburg, NY

Head coach

- John Cooper (Wichita State)

Assistant coach(es)

- Rick Duckett (North Carolina)
- Sheldon Everett (South Carolina)
- Trey Meyer (Clemson)

Legend

- (C) Team captain
- (S) Suspended
- (I) Ineligible
- (W) Walk-on
- Injured
- Current redshirt

Roster
Last update: September 17, 2024

== Schedule and results ==
Date time, TV	Opponent	Result	Record	Site (attendance) city, state
Exhibition
October 30, 2013*; 7:00 p.m.	Northwood	W 76–71	0–0	Millett Hall (N/A); Oxford, OH
Non-conference games
November 8, 2013*; 7:00 p.m., ESPN3	at No. 21 Notre Dame	L 62–74	0–1	Edmund P. Joyce Center (7,783); Notre Dame, IN
November 12, 2013*; 9:00 p.m., P12N	at Arizona State	L 54–90	0–2	Wells Fargo Arena (4,796); Tempe, AZ
November 20, 2013*; 8:00 p.m., FS1	at Xavier	L 51–77	0–3	Cintas Center (9,514); Cincinnati, OH
November 23, 2013*; 3:00 p.m.	Wilmington	L 63–65	0–4	Millett Hall (1,932); Oxford, OH
December 3, 2013*; 7:00 p.m.	IPFW	W 94–87	1–4	Millett Hall (1,667); Oxford, OH
December 7, 2013*; 2:05 p.m.	at Evansville	L 65–78	1–5	Ford Center (3,305); Evansville, IN
December 15, 2013*; 2:00 p.m.	Wright State	W 59–56	2–5	Millett Hall (1,338); Oxford, OH
December 18, 2013*; 8:05 p.m.	at UMKC	L 55–69	2–6	Swinney Recreation Center (1,306); Kansas City, MO
December 21, 2013*; 8:00 p.m.	at Tennessee State	W 79–64	3–6	Gentry Complex (812); Nashville, TN
December 29, 2013*; 3:30 p.m.	Southern Illinois	W 67–65	4–6	Millett Hall (1,072); Oxford, OH
January 4, 2014*; 7:00 p.m.	at No. 23 Massachusetts	L 65–73	4–7	William D. Mullins Memorial Center (5,864); Amherst, MA
Conference games
January 8, 2014; 7:00 p.m.	at Central Michigan	W 77–70	5–7 (1–0)	McGuirk Arena (1,592); Mount Pleasant, MI
January 11, 2014; 3:00 p.m.	Western Michigan	L 77–78 ^{OT}	5–8 (1–1)	Millett Hall (981); Oxford, OH
January 15, 2014; 7:00 p.m.	at Akron	L 52–59	5–9 (1–2)	James A. Rhodes Arena (3,058); Akron, OH
January 18, 2014; 2:00 p.m.	at Ball State	W 64–52	6–9 (2–2)	John E. Worthen Arena (3,054); Muncie, IN
January 22, 2014; 7:00 p.m.	Central Michigan	W 86–80	7–9 (3–2)	Millett Hall (746); Oxford, OH
January 25, 2014; 2:00 p.m.	at Bowling Green	W 70–65	8–9 (4–2)	Stroh Center (1,797); Bowling Green, OH
January 29, 2014; 7:00 p.m.	Toledo	L 70–83	8–10 (4–3)	Millett Hall (1,448); Oxford, OH
February 1, 2014; 3:00 p.m.	Eastern Michigan	W 65–61	9–10 (5–3)	Millett Hall (1,038); Oxford, OH
February 4, 2014; 7:00 p.m.	at Northern Illinois	L 41–53	9–11 (5–4)	Convocation Center (644); DeKalb, IL
February 8, 2014; 2:00 p.m.	at Ohio	L 75–82	9–12 (5–5)	Convocation Center (10,669); Athens, OH
February 12, 2014; 7:00 p.m.	Buffalo	L 62–75	9–13 (5–6)	Millett Hall (1,084); Oxford, OH
February 15, 2014; 4:30 p.m.	at Western Michigan	L 57–68	9–14 (5–7)	University Arena (3,290); Kalamazoo, MI
February 19, 2014; 7:00 p.m.	Kent State	L 63–75	9–15 (5–8)	Millett Hall (1,021); Oxford, OH
February 23, 2014; 2:00 p.m.	Bowling Green	W 55–52	10–15 (6–8)	Millett Hall (945); Oxford, OH
February 26, 2014; 7:00 p.m.	Akron	W 65–61	11–15 (7–8)	Millett Hall (1,004); Oxford, OH
March 1, 2014; 12:00 p.m.	at Buffalo	L 55–78	11–16 (7–9)	Alumni Arena (4,402); Amherst, NY
March 4, 2014; 7:00 p.m.	at Kent State	W 73–61	12–16 (8–9)	MAC Center (2,414); Kent, OH
March 8, 2014; 12:00 p.m.	Ohio	L 76–82 ^{OT}	12–17 (8–10)	Millett Hall (1,760); Oxford, OH
MAC tournament
March 10, 2014; 7:00 p.m.	Kent State; First round	W 71–64	13–17	Millett Hall (780); Oxford, OH
March 12, 2014; 6:30 p.m.	vs. Ohio; Second round	L 55–63	13–18	Quicken Loans Arena (513); Cleveland, OH
*Non-conference game. ^{#}Rankings from AP poll. (#) Tournament seedings in parentheses. All times are in Eastern.
