= 2013–14 Western Michigan Broncos men's basketball team =

American college basketball season

2013–14 Western Michigan Broncos men's basketball

Rainbow Classic champions MAC West Division co-champions MAC regular season co-champions MAC tournament champions

NCAA tournament, round of 64
- Conference: Mid-American Conference
- West Division
- Record: 23–10 (14–4 MAC)
- Head coach: Steve Hawkins (11th season)
- Assistant coaches: Clayton Bates; Larry Farmer; James Holland
- Home arena: University Arena

2013–14 Mid-American Conference men's basketball standings
	Conf.				Overall
Team	W		L	PCT	W		L	PCT
East
Buffalo	13	–	5	.722	19	–	10	.655
Akron	12	–	6	.667	21	–	13	.618
Ohio	11	–	7	.611	25	–	12	.676
Miami	8	–	10	.444	13	–	18	.419
Kent State	7	–	11	.389	16	–	16	.500
Bowling Green	6	–	12	.333	12	–	20	.375
West
Toledo	14	–	4	.778	27	–	7	.794
Western Michigan †	14	–	4	.778	23	–	10	.697
Eastern Michigan	10	–	8	.556	22	–	15	.595
Northern Illinois	8	–	10	.444	15	–	17	.469
Central Michigan	3	–	15	.167	10	–	21	.323
Ball State	2	–	16	.111	5	–	25	.167
† 2014 MAC tournament winner

The 2013–14 Western Michigan Broncos men's basketball team represented Western Michigan University (WMU) during the 2013–14 NCAA Division I men's basketball season. The Broncos were Mid-American Conference (MAC) overall and West Division co-champions with Toledo, received the No. 1 seed in the conference tournament and defeated Toledo in the conference finals to receive the MAC's automatic berth into the 2014 NCAA Division I men's basketball tournament. WMU is led by 11th year head coach Steve Hawkins and play their home games at University Arena in Kalamazoo, Michigan.

WMU was given a 14 seed in the NCAA Tournament and lost to No. 3 seeded Syracuse in the second round 77–53. Syracuse was ranked No. 14 in the AP Poll.

Seniors David Brown and Shayne Whittington were awarded All-MAC first team honors while Hawkins was awarded the MAC Coach of the Year.

== 2013 recruiting class ==
Western Michigan brought in three freshmen from high school detailed in the following table.

College recruiting information
Name	Hometown	School	Height	Weight	Commit date
Mario Matasovic; Power forward	Delafield, WI	St. John's NW Military Academy	6 ft 8 in (2.03 m)	213 lb (97 kg)	May 17, 2013
Mario Matasovic; Power forward	Recruit ratings: (69)				
Leo Svete; Small forward	Granger, IN	Penn High School	6 ft 5 in (1.96 m)	188 lb (85 kg)	Jul 6, 2012
Leo Svete; Small forward	Recruit ratings: Scout: (67)				
Tucker Haymond; Shooting guard	Seattle, WA	Garfield High School	6 ft 6 in (1.98 m)	210 lb (95 kg)	Jan 6, 2013
Tucker Haymond; Shooting guard	Recruit ratings: No ratings found				
Overall recruit ranking: Scout: N/A Rivals: N/A
Note: In many cases, Scout, Rivals, 247Sports, On3, and ESPN may conflict in their listings of height and weight.; In these cases, the average was taken. ESPN grades are on a 100-point scale.; Sources: "Rivals Western Michigan Basketball Commitment List". Rivals.; "Scout Western Michigan Basketball Commitment List". Scout.; "ESPN Western Michigan Basketball Commitment List". ESPN.; "Scout.com Team Recruiting Rankings". Scout.; "2013 Team Ranking". Rivals.

== Preseason ==
West Division preseason poll
School	Points
Toledo (24)	149
Western Michigan	108
Eastern Michigan (1)	101
Ball State	89
Central Michigan	50
Northern Illinois	28
First place votes in parentheses.

WMU was picked by a 25-member MAC news media panel to finish second in the MAC West Division. They finished with 108 points, 41 points behind first place Toledo and 7 points ahead of third place Eastern Michigan. Senior forward Shayne Whittington was selected to the West Division All-MAC Team. The Broncos did not receive any first place votes to win the division nor any votes to win the conference tournament.

Western Michigan defeated Kalamazoo College 88–59 and Aquinas College 69–54 in exhibition games at University Arena prior to opening the regular season against New Mexico State in the Rainbow Classic.

== Season ==
=== Rainbow Classic ===
Western Michigan opened the 2013–14 season in Hawaii by winning the Rainbow Classic. WMU finished 2–1 in the four-team, round-robin tournament along with New Mexico State and Hawaiʻi and was awarded the title based on the tiebreaker of fewest points allowed in the tournament. The Broncos gave up 194 total points while New Mexico State and Hawaiʻi allowed 213 and 218 points, respectively.

Senior guard David Brown was named to the All-Tournament Team.

=== Awards ===
The Broncos received six MAC West Division Player of the Week awards this season.

==== David Brown ====
Senior guard David Brown was named the MAC West Division Player of the Week on February 10, 2014. In two wins over Ohio and Northern Illinois, Brown averaged 23 points per game. Brown shot 14–23 (61%) for field goals and 10–14 (71%) on three-point field goals. He also had eight rebounds and five steals during the week. In the NIU game, Brown had 20 points in the first half while making his first nine shots of the game.

==== Connar Tava ====
Sophomore forward Connar Tava was named the MAC West Division Player of the Week on December 2, 2013. Tava averaged 18 points, 10 rebounds, 3 assists and 2 steals in a 99–88 win over Oakland and an 83–70 win over Cornell. Tava made all eight field goal attempts against Oakland and recorded his first career double–double against Cornell.

Tava won his second MAC West Division Player of the Week on January 13, 2014. In two victories over preseason favorite Toledo and Miami, Tava averaged 23.5 points per game and made 16 of 17 field goals (94.1%). The only field goal he missed was his final shot of the game against Miami. Tava also recorded nine rebounds, six assists, two blocked shots and two steals during the two games.

==== Shayne Whittington ====
Senior center Shayne Whittington was named the MAC West Division Player of the Week on January 27, 2014. Whittington averaged 19.5 points, 10.5 rebounds and 1.5 blocked shots per game in two wins against Kent State and Ball State.

Whittington was named the co-MAC West Division Player of the Week on February 17, 2014. Whittington averaged 16.5 points and 8.5 rebounds per game in two wins over Akron and Miami that moved WMU into a tie for first place in the MAC. He also recorded four blocks against Miami.

He earned his second consecutive MAC West Player of the Week on February 24, 2014. In wins over Ohio and Eastern Michigan, Whittington averaged 16.5 points and 11.0 rebounds per game. He did that while missing two practices prior to the EMU game.

== Roster ==
Number	Name	Position	Height	Weight	Year	Hometown
00	Von Washington	Guard	6′ 0″	175	Freshman (redshirt)	Kalamazoo, Michigan
1	Tucker Haymond	Guard/forward	6′ 5″	210	Freshman	Seattle, Washington
2	Connar Tava	Forward	6′ 5″	235	Sophomore	Macomb, Michigan
3	Hayden Hoerdemann	Guard	6′ 3″	195	Junior	Bloomington, Illinois
4	Jared Klein	Guard	6′ 1″	180	Sophomore	Otsego, Michigan
5	David Brown	Guard	6′ 3″	210	Senior (redshirt)	Roscoe, Illinois
11	Bishop Robinson	Guard	6′ 2″	180	Freshman	Kalamazoo, Michigan
20	Tim Brennan	Guard/forward	6′ 5″	195	Junior	Chicago, Illinois
21	Shayne Whittington	Center	6′ 11″	250	Senior (redshirt)	Paw Paw, Michigan
22	Austin Richie	Guard	6′ 2″	185	Junior	Lowell, Indiana
31	Mario Matasovic	Forward	6′ 7″	215	Freshman	Croatia
32	Taylor Perry	Guard	6′ 4″	195	Sophomore	Rochester, Michigan
33	Leo Svete	Guard	6′ 5″	190	Freshman	Granger, Indiana
34	A. J. Avery	Forward	6′ 6″	205	Sophomore	Chicago, Illinois
35	Charles Harris	Guard/forward	6′ 4″	190	Freshman (redshirt)	Antioch, Illinois
40	Kellen McCormick	Forward	6′ 8″	220	Freshman (redshirt)	West Bloomfield, Michigan

== Schedule ==
Date time, TV	Rank^{#}	Opponent^{#}	Result	Record	Site (attendance) city, state
November 9, 2013*; 1:30 am		vs. New Mexico State; Rainbow Classic	W 70-64	1–0	Stan Sheriff Center (5,720); Honolulu, HI
November 10, 2013*; 12:30 am, OC Sports		at Hawaiʻi; Rainbow Classic	L 68-78	1–1	Stan Sheriff Center (5,861); Honolulu, HI
November 11, 2013*; 7:00 pm		vs. Tennessee State; Rainbow Classic	W 63–52	2–1	Stan Sheriff Center (156); Honolulu, HI
November 17, 2013*; 2:00 pm		Alabama A&M	W 73–69	3–1	University Arena (2,132); Kalamazoo, MI
November 20, 2013*; 7:00 pm		North Dakota State	L 74-83	3–2	University Arena (2,111); Kalamazoo, MI
November 26, 2013*; 7:00 pm		Oakland	W 99–88	4–2	University Arena (2,228); Kalamazoo, MI
November 29, 2013*; 7:00 pm		Cornell	W 83–70	5–2	University Arena (2,566); Kalamazoo, MI
December 7, 2013*; 5:00 pm		at Northwestern	L 35-51	5–3	Welsh–Ryan Arena (6,167); Evanston, IL
December 15, 2013*; 7:00 pm, ESPNU		at No. 24 Missouri	L 60-66	5–4	Mizzou Arena (7,252); Columbia, MO
December 18, 2013*; 8:05 pm		at Drake	L 68-71	5–5	Knapp Center (3,054); Des Moines, IA
December 21, 2013*; 2:00 pm		Prairie View A&M	W 92–53	6–5	University Arena (3,142); Kalamazoo, MI
January 2, 2014*; 7:00 pm		Siena Heights	W 83–47	7–5	University Arena (2,436); Kalamazoo, MI
January 8, 2014; 7:00 pm		Toledo	W 87–76	8–5 (1–0)	University Arena (2,482); Kalamazoo, MI
January 11, 2014; 3:00 pm		at Miami	W 78–77 ^{OT}	9–5 (2–0)	Millett Hall (981); Oxford, OH
January 14, 2014; 7:00 pm, TWCSC Ohio		at Eastern Michigan; Michigan MAC Trophy	L 37-56	9–6 (2–1)	Convocation Center (1,049); Ypsilanti, MI
January 19, 2014; 2:00 pm, TWCSC Ohio		Bowling Green	L 64-69	9–7 (2–2)	University Arena (2,437); Kalamazoo, MI
January 23, 2014; 7:00 pm		at Kent State	W 75–59	10–7 (3–2)	Memorial Athletic and Convocation Center (2,993); Kent, OH
January 26, 2014; 2:00 pm, Ball State Sports Network		Ball State	W 62–53	11–7 (4–2)	University Arena (2,698); Kalamazoo, MI
January 29, 2014; 7:00 pm		at Buffalo	L 63-84	11–8 (4–3)	Alumni Arena (3,052); Amherst, NY
February 1, 2014; 2:00 pm		Central Michigan; Michigan MAC Trophy	W 75–72	12–8 (5–3)	University Arena (3,504); Kalamazoo, MI
February 5, 2014; 7:00 pm		Ohio	W 90–74	13–8 (6–3)	University Arena (2,344); Kalamazoo, MI
February 9, 2014; 4:30 pm		at Northern Illinois	W 74–71	14–8 (7–3)	Convocation Center (2,005); DeKalb, IL
February 12, 2014; 7:00 pm		Akron	W 57–54	15–8 (8–3)	University Arena (2,369); Kalamazoo, MI
February 15, 2014; 4:30 pm		Miami	W 68–57	16–8 (9–3)	University Arena (3,290); Kalamazoo, MI
February 19, 2014; 7:00 pm		at Ohio	W 73–63	17–8 (10–3)	Convocation Center (6,319); Athens, OH
February 23, 2014; 2:00 pm		Eastern Michigan; Michigan MAC Trophy	W 75–67	18–8 (11–3)	University Arena (3,204); Kalamazoo, MI
February 26, 2014; 7:00 pm, TWCSC Ohio		at Ball State	W 88–81 ^{OT}	19–8 (12–3)	John E. Worthen Arena (2,590); Muncie, IN
March 1, 2014; 6:00 pm, TWCSC Ohio		at Toledo	L 85-96 ^{OT}	19–9 (12–4)	Savage Arena (6,912); Toledo, OH
March 4, 2014; 7:00 pm		Northern Illinois	W 61–56	20–9 (13–4)	University Arena (3,176); Kalamazoo, MI
March 7, 2014; 7:00 pm		at Central Michigan; Michigan MAC Trophy	W 78–64	21–9 (14–4)	McGuirk Arena (2,087); Mount Pleasant, MI
MAC tournament
March 14, 2014; 6:30 pm, TWCSC Ohio	No. (1)	vs. No. (4) Akron; Semifinals	W 64–60 ^{OT}	22–9	Quicken Loans Arena (6,318); Cleveland, OH
March 15, 2014; 6:30 pm, ESPN2	No. (1)	vs. No. (2) Toledo; Championship	W 98–77	23–9	Quicken Loans Arena (5,278); Cleveland, OH
NCAA tournament
March 20, 2014*; 2:45 pm, CBS	No. (14 S)	vs. No. 14 (3 S) Syracuse; Second round	L 53-77	23–10	First Niagara Center (19,260); Buffalo, NY
*Non-conference game. ^{#}Rankings from AP Poll. Rankings in parentheses indicate tournament seeds. (#) Tournament seedings in parentheses. All times are in Eastern Time.
