= 2013–14 Kent State Golden Flashes men's basketball team =

American college basketball season

2013–14 Kent State Golden Flashes men's basketball
- Conference: Mid-American Conference
- East Division
- Record: 16–16 (7–11 MAC)
- Head coach: Rob Senderoff (3rd season)
- Assistant coaches: Eric Haut; Bobby Steinburg; DeAndre Haynes
- Home arena: MAC Center

2013–14 Mid-American Conference men's basketball standings
	Conf.				Overall
Team	W		L	PCT	W		L	PCT
East
Buffalo	13	–	5	.722	19	–	10	.655
Akron	12	–	6	.667	21	–	13	.618
Ohio	11	–	7	.611	25	–	12	.676
Miami	8	–	10	.444	13	–	18	.419
Kent State	7	–	11	.389	16	–	16	.500
Bowling Green	6	–	12	.333	12	–	20	.375
West
Toledo	14	–	4	.778	27	–	7	.794
Western Michigan †	14	–	4	.778	23	–	10	.697
Eastern Michigan	10	–	8	.556	22	–	15	.595
Northern Illinois	8	–	10	.444	15	–	17	.469
Central Michigan	3	–	15	.167	10	–	21	.323
Ball State	2	–	16	.111	5	–	25	.167
† 2014 MAC tournament winner

The 2013–14 Kent State Golden Flashes men's basketball team represented Kent State University during the 2013–14 NCAA Division I men's basketball season. The Golden Flashes, led by third year head coach Rob Senderoff, played their home games at the Memorial Athletic and Convocation Center, colloquially known as the MAC Center, as members of the East Division of the Mid-American Conference. They finished the season 16–16, 7–11 in MAC play to finish in fifth place in the East Division. They lost in the first round of the MAC tournament to Miami (OH).

== Season ==
=== Preseason ===
On May 30, 2013, Senderoff announced the team's complete non-conference schedule for the season. Key games included participation in the Coaches Vs. Cancer Classic, along with games against 2013 NCAA tournament participants Temple and Bucknell. The team's conference slate was announced on September 3, 2013. The Flashes scheduled to play Akron, Bowling Green, Buffalo, Miami, Ohio, Central Michigan, and Northern Illinois twice each in home-and-home series, while playing Ball State, Eastern Michigan, Toledo, and Western Michigan once each.

== Roster ==
2013–14 Kent State Golden Flashes men's basketball team
Players
Coaches

Pos.	#	Name	Height	Weight	Year	Previous school	Hometown
G	0	Devareaux Manley	6 ft 4 in (1.93 m)	195 lb (88 kg)	Jr	Castlemont HS	Oakland, CA
G	1	Kris Brewer	6 ft 3 in (1.91 m)	185 lb (84 kg)	Jr	Brehm Prep	Memphis, TN
G	2	Kellon Thomas	5 ft 11 in (1.8 m)	180 lb (82 kg)	So	Southport HS	Indianapolis, IN
G/F	3	Devin Carter	6 ft 4 in (1.93 m)	200 lb (91 kg)	So	Centennial HS; Lake Land College	Champaign, IL
F	4	Chris Ortiz	6 ft 8 in (2.03 m)	225 lb (102 kg)	So	South Kent School	Brooklyn, NY
G	5	Tyler Scott	6 ft 5 in (1.96 m)	202 lb (92 kg)	RS Fr	Gateway HS	Pittsburgh, PA
G	11	Jon Fleming	5 ft 9 in (1.75 m)	160 lb (73 kg)	Fr	Fishers HS	Fishers, IN
F	13	Mark Henninger	6 ft 9 in (2.06 m)	230 lb (104 kg)	Sr	Jackson HS	Massillon, OH
G	14	K. K. Simmons	6 ft 3 in (1.91 m)	190 lb (86 kg)	RS So	Wheeler HS; UNC Wilmington	Marietta, GA
F	20	Marquiez Lawrence	6 ft 8 in (2.03 m)	200 lb (91 kg)	Fr	Marion-Franklin HS	Columbus, OH
F	21	Khalig Spicer	6 ft 9 in (2.06 m)	210 lb (95 kg)	So	Robichaud HS	Detroit, MI
G	23	Derek Jackson	6 ft 1 in (1.85 m)	175 lb (79 kg)	RS Jr	Benedictine HS; Central Michigan	Cleveland, OH
F	32	Melvin Tabb	6 ft 9 in (2.06 m)	255 lb (116 kg)	Sr	Enloe HS; Wake Forest; Midland College	Raleigh, NC
F	35	Jimmy Hall (I)	6 ft 7 in (2.01 m)	215 lb (98 kg)	So	St. Anthony HS; Hofstra	Brooklyn, NY
C	41	Blake Vedder (I)	7 ft 4 in (2.24 m)	235 lb (107 kg)	Sr	West Geauga HS; Indiana (PA)	Chesterland, OH
F	42	Darren Goodson	6 ft 5 in (1.96 m)	245 lb (111 kg)	Sr	Aiken HS; Pensacola State College	Cincinnati, OH

Head coach

- Rob Senderoff (Albany)

Assistant coach(es)

- Eric Haut (Kent State)
- Bobby Steinberg (Middle Tennessee)
- DeAndre Haynes (Kent State)

Legend

- (C) Team captain
- (S) Suspended
- (I) Ineligible
- (W) Walk-on
- Injured
- Current redshirt

== Schedule and results ==
Date time, TV	Opponent	Result	Record	Site (attendance) city, state
Non-Conference Games
11/8/2013*; 7:00 pm	Ohio Northern	W 84–48	1–0	MAC Center (2,240); Kent, OH
11/11/2013*; 7:00 pm, ESPNU	at Temple	W 81–77	2–0	Liacouras Center (6,589); Philadelphia, PA
11/13/2013*; 7:00 pm	at Seton Hall; Coaches Vs. Cancer Classic	L 76–78	2–1	Prudential Center (5,601); Newark, NJ
11/17/2013*; 2:00 pm	Saint Peter's	W 75–58	3–1	MAC Center (2,282); Kent, OH
11/21/2013*; 7:00 pm	Western Carolina; Coaches Vs. Cancer Classic	W 72–59	4–1	MAC Center (2,473); Kent, OH
11/22/2013*; 7:00 pm	USC Upstate; Coaches Vs. Cancer Classic	W 79–78	5–1	MAC Center (2,394); Kent, OH
11/23/2013*; 7:00 pm	Niagara; Coaches Vs. Cancer Classic	W 102–97	6–1	MAC Center (2,173); Kent, OH
11/27/2013*; 7:00 pm	Youngstown State	W 83–79	7–1	MAC Center (1,963); Kent, OH
12/1/2013*; 2:00 pm	Kennesaw State	W 68–51	8–1	MAC Center (1,994); Kent, OH
12/4/2013*; 7:00 pm	Bucknell	L 59–66	8–2	MAC Center (2,657); Kent, OH
12/21/2013*; 3:00 pm	at College of Charleston	W 58–54	9–2	TD Arena (2,361); Charleston, SC
12/28/2013*; 7:00 pm	Cleveland State	L 70–78	9–3	MAC Center (4,553); Kent, OH
12/31/2013*; 12:00 pm	at Princeton	L 68–73	9–4	Jadwin Gymnasium (2,440); Princeton, NJ
Conference Games
1/8/2014; 7:00 pm	Ohio	L 53–59	9–5 (0–1)	MAC Center (4,143); Kent, OH
1/11/2014; 7:00 pm	Ball State	W 86–74	10–5 (1–1)	MAC Center (3,764); Kent, OH
1/15/2014; 8:00 pm	at Northern Illinois	W 73–64 ^{OT}	11–5 (2–1)	Convocation Center (651); DeKalb, IL
1/18/2014; 2:30 pm	at Buffalo	L 60–71	11–6 (2–2)	Alumni Arena (3,347); Amherst, NY
1/23/2014; 7:00 pm	Western Michigan	L 59–75	11–7 (2–3)	MAC Center (2,993); Kent, OH
1/26/2014; 6:00 pm	at Toledo	L 78–81	11–8 (2–4)	Savage Arena (5,611); Toledo, OH
1/29/2014; 7:00 pm	Northern Illinois	L 49–50	11–9 (2–5)	MAC Center (2,234); Kent, OH
2/1/2014; 6:00 pm	Akron	W 60–57	12–9 (3–5)	MAC Center (6,181); Kent, OH
2/5/2014; 7:00 pm	at Central Michigan	L 73–78 ^{OT}	12–10 (3–6)	McGuirk Arena (1,743); Mount Pleasant, MI
2/8/2014; 2:00 pm	at Eastern Michigan	L 53–70	12–11 (3–7)	Convocation Center (716); Ypsilanti, MI
2/12/2014; 7:00 pm	Bowling Green	W 62–61	13–11 (4–7)	MAC Center (2,724); Kent, OH
2/15/2014; 6:00 pm	Central Michigan	W 83–75	14–11 (5–7)	MAC Center (2,528); Kent, OH
2/19/2014; 7:00 pm	at Miami (OH)	W 75–63	15–11 (6–7)	Millett Hall (1,021); Oxford, OH
2/22/2014; 12:00 pm	Buffalo	L 69–78	15–12 (6–8)	MAC Center (3,104); Kent, OH
2/26/2014; 7:00 pm	at Bowling Green	L 66–73	15–13 (6–9)	Stroh Center (1,333); Bowling Green, OH
3/1/2014; 2:00 pm	at Ohio	W 75–61	16–13 (7–9)	Convocation Center (6,820); Athens, OH
3/4/2014; 7:00 pm	Miami (OH)	L 61–73	16–14 (7–10)	MAC Center (2,414); Kent, OH
3/8/2014; 7:00 pm	at Akron	L 54–58	16–15 (7–11)	James A. Rhodes Arena (5,488); Akron, OH
2014 MAC tournament
03/10/2014; 7:00 pm	vs. Miami (OH); First round	L 64–71	16–16	Millett Hall (780); Oxford, OH
*Non-conference game. ^{#}Rankings from AP Poll. (#) Tournament seedings in parentheses. All times are in Eastern.
