= Nick Kellogg =

American basketball player

Paris Basketball
- Position: Guard
- League: LNB Pro B

Personal information
- Born: December 11, 1991 (age 34) Westerville, Ohio, U.S.
- Listed height: 6 ft 3 in (1.91 m)
- Listed weight: 198 lb (90 kg)

Career information
- High school: St. Francis DeSales (Columbus, Ohio)
- College: Ohio (2010–2014)
- NBA draft: 2014: undrafted
- Playing career: 2014–present

Career history
- 2014–2015: BC Batumi
- 2015–2017: Start Lublin
- 2018–present: Paris

Career highlights
- Second-team All-MAC (2014); MAC All-Freshman team (2011)

Nick Kellogg (born December 11, 1991) is an American professional basketball player who plays for Paris Basketball. He is the son of former National Basketball Association (NBA) player Clark Kellogg. He went to St. Francis DeSales High School in Columbus, Ohio, where he played basketball and competed in consecutive state Final Fours. He played collegiate basketball for Ohio University.

== College career ==
=== Recruitment ===
College recruiting
Name	Hometown	School	Height	Weight	Commit date
Nick Kellogg; PG	Westerville, OH	St. Francis DeSales HS	6 ft 3 in (1.91 m)	185 lb (84 kg)	Nov 19, 2009
Nick Kellogg; PG	Recruit ratings: Rivals: (86)				
Overall recruit ranking:
Note: In many cases, Scout, Rivals, 247Sports, On3, and ESPN may conflict in their listings of height and weight.; In these cases, the average was taken. ESPN grades are on a 100-point scale.; Sources: "Ohio Commit List for 2010". Rivals.; "Scout.com: Men's Basketball Recruiting". Scout.; "Ohio Basketball Recruiting 2010". ESPN.; "Scout.com Team Recruiting Rankings". Scout.; "2010 Team Ranking". Rivals.

=== Overview ===
Kellogg was a four-year starter for the Ohio Bobcats men's basketball team, helping the Bobcats win the MAC tournament in 2012. In the 2013–14 season, he set the school record for career 3 point shots made (previously held by former teammate D. J. Cooper) in his final regular season game as a Bobcat versus Miami (OH). Kellogg later broke the same record for the Mid-American Conference (MAC) in the first round MAC tournament win over Ball State. During his career at Ohio, Kellogg participated in the NCAA tournament (2012) ending in the "Sweet Sixteen", NIT (2013), and the CIT (2011 and 2014).

Kellogg played in the 2014 Portsmouth Invitational Tournament. He was 1 of 64 seniors in the NCAA invited to participate.

=== Statistics ===
Season	Team	Min	FGM-FGA	FG%	3PM-3PA	3P%	FTM-FTA	FT%	Reb	Ast	Blk	Stl	PF	TO	PTS
2010–11	Ohio	25.8	2.4–5.8	.417	1.8–4.2	.435	1.1–1.4	.760	1.4	2.0	0.0	0.8	2.2	1.1	7.8
2011–12	Ohio	27.5	2.9–6.4	.449	2.3–5.4	.427	0.9–1.1	.897	2.0	1.1	0.1	1.1	1.9	0.8	9.0
2012–13	Ohio	25.6	2.7–6.5	.418	1.6–4.7	.338	1.0–1.3	.791	2.1	1.4	0.1	1.0	1.8	1.2	8.0
2013–14	Ohio	32.6	5.3–11.5	.462	2.4–6.0	.392	2.5–2.9	.887	3.6	2.9	0.0	1.1	2.1	1.5	15.5

All statistics are from espn.com

== Professional career ==
On October 30, 2016, Kellogg was acquired by the Windy City Bulls, but was waived on November 4.
