= 2013–14 Ohio Bobcats men's basketball team =

American college basketball season

2013–14 Ohio Bobcats men's basketball

CIT Quarterfinals vs. VMI, L 90–92
- Conference: Mid-American Conference
- East Division
- Record: 25–12 (11–7 MAC)
- Head coach: Jim Christian (2nd season)
- Assistant coaches: Bill Wuczynski; Anthony Stewart; Aaron Fuss
- Home arena: Convocation Center

2013–14 Mid-American Conference men's basketball standings
	Conf.				Overall
Team	W		L	PCT	W		L	PCT
East
Buffalo	13	–	5	.722	19	–	10	.655
Akron	12	–	6	.667	21	–	13	.618
Ohio	11	–	7	.611	25	–	12	.676
Miami	8	–	10	.444	13	–	18	.419
Kent State	7	–	11	.389	16	–	16	.500
Bowling Green	6	–	12	.333	12	–	20	.375
West
Toledo	14	–	4	.778	27	–	7	.794
Western Michigan †	14	–	4	.778	23	–	10	.697
Eastern Michigan	10	–	8	.556	22	–	15	.595
Northern Illinois	8	–	10	.444	15	–	17	.469
Central Michigan	3	–	15	.167	10	–	21	.323
Ball State	2	–	16	.111	5	–	25	.167
† 2014 MAC tournament winner

The 2013–14 Ohio Bobcats men's basketball team represented Ohio University during the 2013–14 NCAA Division I men's basketball season. The Bobcats, led by second year head coach Jim Christian, played their home games at the Convocation Center as members of the East Division of the Mid-American Conference. They finished the season 25–12, 11–7 in MAC play to finish in third place in the East Division. They advanced to the quarterfinals of the MAC tournament where they lost to Akron. They were invited to the CollegeInsider.com Tournament where they defeated Cleveland State and Wright State to advance to the quarterfinals where they lost to VMI. After the season Christian accepted the head coach position at Boston College.

== Before the season ==
=== Departures ===
Departures
Name	Number	Pos.	Height	Weight	Year	Hometown	Reason
Nick Goff	2	G	6'2"	183	RS Junior	Columbus, OH	Graduated
Walter Offutt	3	G	6'4"	202	RS Senior	Indianapolis, IN	Graduated
David McKinley	4	G	5'10"	171	Senior	Dublin, OH	Graduated
D. J. Cooper	5	G	6'0"	176	Senior	Chicago, IL	Graduated; entered NBA draft, plays professionally with P.A.O.K. BC
Ivo Baltic	23	F	6'9"	214	Senior	Kansas City, MO	Graduated; plays professionally with KK Cedevita
Reggie Keely	30	F	6'9"	239	Senior	University Heights, OH	Graduated; plays professionally with Den Helder Kings

=== Recruits ===
College recruiting information
Name	Hometown	School	Height	Weight	Commit date
Antonio Campbell; PF	Covington, KY	Holy Cross High School	6 ft 7 in (2.01 m)	225 lb (102 kg)	Sep 15, 2012
Antonio Campbell; PF	Recruit ratings: Scout: Rivals: (68)				
Wadley Mompremier; C	Miami, FL	Miami Senior High School	6 ft 9 in (2.06 m)	210 lb (95 kg)	Oct 6, 2012
Wadley Mompremier; C	Recruit ratings: Scout: Rivals: (53)				
D. J. Wingfield; SF	Cincinnati, OH	Walnut Hills High School	6 ft 4 in (1.93 m)	205 lb (93 kg)	Oct 1, 2012
D. J. Wingfield; SF	Recruit ratings: Scout: Rivals: (NR)				
Maurice Ndour; PF	New Rochelle, NY	Monroe College (JC)	6 ft 8 in (2.03 m)	200 lb (91 kg)	Oct 13, 2012
Maurice Ndour; PF	Recruit ratings: Scout: Rivals: (JC)				
Overall recruit ranking:
Note: In many cases, Scout, Rivals, 247Sports, On3, and ESPN may conflict in their listings of height and weight.; In these cases, the average was taken. ESPN grades are on a 100-point scale.; Sources: "2013 Ohio Basketball Commitment List". Rivals.; "2013 Ohio Basketball Recruiting Commits". Scout.; "Scout.com Team Recruiting Rankings". Scout.; "2013 Team Ranking". Rivals.

== Season ==
The Bobcats started the 2013-14 season strong. In non-conference play the team went 10-3 only losing to #10 Ohio State, #20 Massachusetts, and Oakland. Once Mid-American Conference (MAC) play began the streak continued, starting 6-2 in conference play. At the conclusion of the regular season, the Bobcats finished 21-10, 11-7 in the MAC, and clinched the 5th seed in the 2014 MAC men's basketball tournament. With 21 wins, it is the 4th time within 5 years the Bobcats have reached 20 or more wins in a season. Senior Nick Kellogg broke the school record for career 3 point shots made (previously held by D. J. Cooper) in his final regular season game against Miami {OH}. Kellogg later broke the MAC record for career 3 point shots made in the first round MAC tournament win over Ball State. Ohio lost to Akron in the quarterfinals of the 2014 MAC tournament.

== Roster ==
2013–14 Ohio Bobcats men's basketball team
Players
Coaches

Pos.	#	Name	Height	Weight	Year	Hometown
F	0	Treg Setty	6 ft 9 in (2.06 m)	196 lb (89 kg)	RS So	Maysville, KY
G/F	2	D. J. Wingfield	6 ft 5 in (1.96 m)	200 lb (91 kg)	Fr	Cincinnati, OH
G	3	Javarez Willis	5 ft 11 in (1.8 m)	175 lb (79 kg)	RS Jr	Homer, LA
F	4	Wadly Mompremier	6 ft 10 in (2.08 m)	213 lb (97 kg)	Fr	Miami, FL
F	5	Maurice Ndour	6 ft 9 in (2.06 m)	203 lb (92 kg)	Jr	Mbour, Senegal
G/F	11	Khari Harley	6 ft 8 in (2.03 m)	170 lb (77 kg)	Fr	Egg Harbor Township, NJ
G	12	Drew Crabtree	6 ft 0 in (1.83 m)	185 lb (84 kg)	Fr	Marysville, OH
G/F	13	T. J. Hall	6 ft 6 in (1.98 m)	210 lb (95 kg)	Sr	Gainesville, FL
G	15	Nick Kellogg	6 ft 3 in (1.91 m)	198 lb (90 kg)	Sr	Westerville, OH
G/F	20	Ricardo Johnson	6 ft 5 in (1.96 m)	207 lb (94 kg)	Sr	Covington, KY
F	21	Jon Smith	6 ft 7 in (2.01 m)	189 lb (86 kg)	RS Sr	Grove City, OH
G	22	Stevie Taylor	5 ft 10 in (1.78 m)	167 lb (76 kg)	Jr	Gahanna, OH
G	24	Travis Wilkins	6 ft 4 in (1.93 m)	192 lb (87 kg)	Sr	Springfield, MO
F	33	Antonio Campbell	6 ft 8 in (2.03 m)	279 lb (127 kg)	Fr	Cincinnati, OH

Head coach

- Jim Christian (Rhode Island)

Assistant coach(es)

- Bill Wuczynski (UNLV)
- Anthony Stewart (Mount Union)
- Aaron Fuss (Ohio State)

Legend

- (C) Team captain
- (S) Suspended
- (I) Ineligible
- (W) Walk-on
- Injured
- Current redshirt

Roster

== Preseason ==
The preseason poll and league awards were announced by the league office on October 29, 2013. Ohio was picked to finish third in the MAC East

=== Preseason men's basketball poll ===
(First place votes in parentheses)

==== East Division ====
1. Akron 143 (18)
2. Buffalo 120 (6)
3. Ohio 94
4. Kent State 91 (1)
5. Miami 42
6. Bowling Green 35

==== West Division ====
1. Toledo 149 (24)
2. Western Michigan 108
3. Eastern Michigan 101 (1)
4. Ball State 89
5. Central Michigan 50
6. Northern Illinois 28

==== Tournament champs ====
Akron (14), Toledo (7), Buffalo (1)

== Postseason ==
Ohio participated in the 2014 CollegeInsider.com Tournament (CIT) where they beat Cleveland State 64-62 in the first round, defeated Wright State 56-54 in the second round, then lost to VMI 90-92 in the quarterfinals. Senior Jon Smith abruptly quit the team before the first round of the CIT, creating some controversy. The 2013-14 seniors of the Bobcats are the all-time winningest class in the programs history.

== Schedule and results ==
Date time, TV	Opponent	Result	Record	Site (attendance) city, state
Exhibition
11/2/2013*; 2:00 pm	Ashland	W 66–44		Convocation Center (5,742); Athens, OH
Non-conference games
11/9/2013*; 2:00 pm	Northern Iowa	W 75–64	1–0	Convocation Center (11,162); Athens, OH
11/12/2013*; 8:00 pm, BTN	at No. 10 Ohio State	L 69–79	1–1	Value City Arena (17,388); Columbus, OH
11/17/2013*; 2:00 pm	Valparaiso	W 76–72	2–1	Convocation Center (6,144); Athens, OH
11/20/2013*; 7:30 pm	at Morgan State	W 65–62	3–1	Talmadge L. Hill Field House (2,108); Baltimore, MD
11/23/2013*; 2:00 pm	Heidelberg	W 85–57	4–1	Convocation Center (6,069); Athens, OH
11/26/2013*; 7:00 pm	Mercer	W 76–67	5–1	Convocation Center (4,416); Athens, OH
11/30/2013*; 2:00 pm	Evansville	W 81–59	6–1	Convocation Center (4,637); Athens, OH
12/7/2013*; 6:00 pm	at Oakland	L 56–73	6–2	Athletics Center O'Rena (1,315); Rochester, MI
12/14/2013*; 2:00 pm	Alabama A&M	W 72–47	7–2	Convocation Center (5,336); Athens, OH
12/18/2013*; 7:00 pm	No. 20 Massachusetts	L 71–83	7–3	Convocation Center (6,329); Athens, OH
12/22/2013*; 1:00 pm	at Richmond	W 70–69 ^{OT}	8–3	Robins Center (4,722); Richmond, VA
12/30/2013*; 7:00 pm	Longwood	W 78–43	9–3	Convocation Center (5,242); Athens, OH
1/4/2014*; 2:00 pm	at UNC Asheville	W 79–70	10–3	Kimmel Arena (2,389); Asheville, NC
MAC regular season
1/8/2014; 7:00 pm, ESPN3	at Kent State	W 59–53	11–3 (1–0)	MAC Center (4,143); Kent, OH
1/12/2014; 6:00 pm, ESPN3	Akron	L 80–83 ^{2OT}	11–4 (1–1)	Convocation Center (8,114); Athens, OH
1/15/2014; 8:00 pm, ESPN3	Ball State	W 71–51	12–4 (2–1)	Convocation Center (5,942); Athens, OH
1/18/2014; 8:00 pm	at Northern Illinois	W 65–46	13–4 (3–1)	Convocation Center (1,667); DeKalb, IL
1/22/2014; 7:00 pm	Bowling Green	L 56–58	13–5 (3–2)	Convocation Center (5,801); Athens, OH
1/25/2014; 2:00 pm, ESPNU	at Eastern Michigan	W 58–56	14–5 (4–2)	Convocation Center (1,321); Ypsilanti, MI
1/29/2014; 7:00 pm	Central Michigan	W 71–67	15–5 (5–2)	Convocation Center (5,438); Athens, OH
2/1/2014; 1:00 pm, ESPNU	Toledo	W 95–90 ^{OT}	16–5 (6–2)	Convocation Center (9,173); Athens, OH
2/5/2014; 7:00 pm	at Western Michigan	L 74–90	16–6 (6–3)	University Arena (2,344); Kalamazoo, MI
2/8/2014; 2:00 pm, ESPN3	Miami (OH)	W 82–75	17–6 (7–3)	Convocation Center (10,669); Athens, OH
2/12/2014; 7:00 pm, ESPN3	at Toledo	L 76–82	17–7 (7–4)	Savage Arena (5,849); Toledo, OH
2/15/2014; 2:30 pm	at Buffalo	W 73–70	18–7 (8–4)	Alumni Arena (5,052); Amherst, NY
2/19/2014; 7:00 pm	Western Michigan	L 63–73	18–8 (8–5)	Convocation Center (6,319); Athens, OH
2/22/2014; 6:00 pm, ESPN3	at Akron	W 66–50	19–8 (9–5)	James A. Rhodes Arena (4,918); Akron, OH
2/26/2014; 7:00 pm	Buffalo	L 64–69	19–9 (9–6)	Convocation Center (6,283); Athens, OH
3/1/2014; 2:00 pm	Kent State	L 61–75	19–10 (9–7)	Convocation Center (6,820); Athens, OH
3/4/2014; 7:00 pm	at Bowling Green	W 72–61	20–10 (10–7)	Stroh Center (1,798); Bowling Green, OH
3/8/2014; 12:00 pm, ESPN3	at Miami (OH)	W 82–76 ^{OT}	21–10 (11–7)	Millett Hall (1,760); Oxford, OH
MAC tournament
3/10/2014; 7:00 pm	Ball State; First round	W 76–64	22–10	Convocation Center (4,153); Athens, OH
3/12/2014; 6:30 pm, ESPN3	vs. Miami (OH); Second round	W 63–55	23–10	Quicken Loans Arena (513); Cleveland, OH
3/13/2014; 6:30 pm, ESPN3	vs. Akron; Quarterfinals	L 77–83	23–11	Quicken Loans Arena (4,116); Cleveland, OH
CIT
3/19/2014*; 7:00 pm	Cleveland State; First round	W 64–62	24–11	Convocation Center (3,261); Athens, OH
3/22/2014*; 2:00 pm	Wright State; Second round	W 56–54	25–11	Convocation Center (3,533); Athens, OH
3/26/2014*; 7:00 pm	VMI; Quarterfinals	L 90–92	25–12	Convocation Center (3,734); Athens, OH
*Non-conference game. ^{#}Rankings from AP Poll. (#) Tournament seedings in parentheses. All times are in Eastern.

== Player honors and awards ==
=== Academic All-MAC Honorable Mentions ===
- Treg Setty - Redshirt Sophomore - 3.212 GPA - Communication Studies
- Travis Wilkins - Senior - 3.570 GPA - Psychology

=== MAC All-Tournament Team ===
- Nick Kellogg - Senior - G

=== All-MAC Second Team ===
- Nick Kellogg - Senior - G
- Maurice Ndour - Junior - F

== Statistics ==
=== Team statistics ===
Final 2013–14 statistics

Record	Ohio	OPP
Scoring	2647	2480
Scoring Average	71.54	67.03
Field goals – Att	937–2042	822–1990
3-pt. Field goals – Att	274–777	194–616
Free throws – Att	499–699	585–826
Rebounds	1252	1252
Assists	559	409
Turnovers	475	445
Steals	238	242
Blocked Shots	157	93

=== Player statistics ===
			Minutes		Scoring		Total FGs			3-point FGs			Free-Throws			Rebounds								
Player	GP	GS	Tot	Avg	Pts	Avg	FG	FGA	Pct	3FG	3FA	Pct	FT	FTA	Pct	Off	Def	Tot	Avg	A	PF	TO	Stl	Blk
Nick Kellogg	37	37	1206	32.6	573	15.5	196	424	0.462	87	222	0.392	94	106	0.887	22	112	134	3.6	109	77	55	39	1
Maurice Ndour	36	31	1084	30.1	498	13.8	182	356	0.511	18	54	0.333	116	159	0.73	58	194	252	7	56	95	89	22	55
Stevie Taylor	36	24	802	22.3	258	7.2	97	237	0.409	32	108	0.296	32	51	0.627	13	53	66	1.8	87	60	47	37	1
Javarez Willis	37	12	758	20.5	254	6.9	86	212	0.406	52	137	0.38	30	34	0.882	4	58	62	1.7	96	49	79	26	0
Travis Wilkins	37	14	890	24.1	245	6.6	82	186	0.441	55	128	0.43	26	32	0.813	14	60	74	2	56	56	27	19	3
Jon Smith	34	33	953	28	239	7	102	158	0.646	0	0	0	35	53	0.66	76	129	205	6	37	102	35	38	54
T.J. Hall	35	11	667	19.1	219	6.3	71	197	0.36	19	78	0.244	58	87	0.667	34	85	119	3.4	59	90	52	27	9
Antonio Campbell	34	9	327	9.6	130	3.8	52	90	0.578	1	9	0.111	25	46	0.543	28	61	89	2.6	11	62	23	7	13
Ricardo Johnson	15	14	339	22.6	109	7.3	32	80	0.4	6	19	0.316	39	57	0.684	22	40	62	4.1	20	40	24	9	8
Treg Setty	36	0	416	11.6	107	3	32	83	0.386	4	19	0.211	39	65	0.6	17	60	77	2.1	28	61	32	13	7
Wadly Mompremier	17	0	74	4.4	13	0.8	4	16	0.25	0	2	0	5	9	0.556	5	10	15	0.9	0	12	3	0	6
Drew Crabtree	6	0	9	1.5	2	0.3	1	3	0.333	0	1	0	0	0	0	0	2	2	0.3	0	2	0	1	0
Total	37	-	7325	-	2647	71.5	937	2042	0.459	274	777	0.353	499	699	0.714	351	901	1252	33.8	559	706	475	238	157
Opponents	37	-	7325	-	2480	67.0	822	1990	0.413	194	616	0.315	585	826	0.708	402	850	1252	33.8	409	632	445	242	93

Legend
GP	Games played	GS	Games started	Avg	Average per game
FG	Field-goals made	FGA	Field-goal attempts	Off	Offensive rebounds
Def	Defensive rebounds	A	Assists	TO	Turnovers
Blk	Blocks	Stl	Steals	High	Team high

== Awards and honors ==
=== All-MAC Awards ===
Postseason All-MAC teams
Team	Player	Position	Year
All-MAC Second Team	Maurice Ndour	F	Jr.
All-MAC Honorable Mention	Nick Kellogg	G	Sr.
