= 2014 MAC men's basketball tournament =

- Classification: Division I
- Season: 2013–14
- Teams: 12
- First round site: Campus sites
- Quarterfinals site: Quicken Loans Arena; Cleveland, Ohio
- Semifinals site: Quicken Loans Arena; Cleveland, Ohio
- Finals site: Quicken Loans Arena; Cleveland, Ohio
- Champions: Western Michigan (2nd title)
- Winning coach: Steve Hawkins (2nd title)
- MVP: David Brown (Western Michigan)
- Top scorer: Nick Kellogg (Ohio) (62 points)
- Television: TWCSC (Ohio), ESPN2
- MAC men's basketball tournaments

2013–14 Mid-American Conference men's basketball standings
	Conf.				Overall
Team	W		L	PCT	W		L	PCT
East
Buffalo	13	–	5	.722	19	–	10	.655
Akron	12	–	6	.667	21	–	13	.618
Ohio	11	–	7	.611	25	–	12	.676
Miami	8	–	10	.444	13	–	18	.419
Kent State	7	–	11	.389	16	–	16	.500
Bowling Green	6	–	12	.333	12	–	20	.375
West
Toledo	14	–	4	.778	27	–	7	.794
Western Michigan †	14	–	4	.778	23	–	10	.697
Eastern Michigan	10	–	8	.556	22	–	15	.595
Northern Illinois	8	–	10	.444	15	–	17	.469
Central Michigan	3	–	15	.167	10	–	21	.323
Ball State	2	–	16	.111	5	–	25	.167
† 2014 MAC tournament winner

The 2014 Mid-American Conference men's basketball tournament was the post-season men's basketball tournament for the Mid-American Conference (MAC) 2013–14 college basketball season. The 2014 tournament was held March 10–15. Top-seeded Western Michigan defeated Toledo in the tournament final. In the NCAA tournament they lost to Syracuse.

== Format ==
First round games were held on campus sites at the higher seed on March 10. The remaining rounds were held at Quicken Loans Arena, between March 12–15. As with the recent tournaments, the top two seeds received byes into the semifinals, with the three and four seeds receiving a bye to the quarterfinals.

== Seeds ==
Seed	School	Conference	Tiebreaker	Notes
1	Western Michigan	14–4	1–1 head-to-head 8–2 vs. division	Bye to semifinals
2	Toledo	14–4	1–1 head-to-head 7–3 vs. division	Bye to semifinals
3	Buffalo	13–5		Bye to quarterfinals
4	Akron	12–6		Bye to quarterfinals
5	Ohio	11–7		
6	Eastern Michigan	10–8		
7	Northern Illinois	8–10	1–0 head-to-head	
8	Miami	8–10	0–1 head-to-head	
9	Kent State	7–11		
10	Bowling Green	6–12		
11	Central Michigan	3–15		
12	Ball State	2–16		

== Schedule ==
Game	Time*	Matchup^{#}	Television
First round – Monday, March 10
1	7:00 pm	#12 Ball State at #5 Ohio	
2	7:00 pm	#9 Kent State at #8 Miami	
3	7:30 pm	#11 Central Michigan at #6 Eastern Michigan	
4	8:00 pm	#10 Bowling Green at #7 Northern Illinois	
Second round – Wednesday, March 12
5	6:30 pm	#5 Ohio vs. #8 Miami	TWCSC (Ohio)
6	9:00 pm	#6 Eastern Michigan vs. #7 Northern Illinois	TWCSC (Ohio)
Quarterfinals – Thursday, March 13
7	6:30 pm	#4 Akron vs. #5 Ohio	TWCSC (Ohio)
8	9:00 pm	#3 Buffalo vs. #6 Eastern Michigan	TWCSC (Ohio)
Semifinals – Friday, March 14
9	6:30 pm	#1 Western Michigan vs. #4 Akron	TWCSC (Ohio)
10	9:00 pm	#2 Toledo vs. #6 Eastern Michigan	TWCSC (Ohio)
Championship – Saturday, March 15
11	6:30 pm	#1 Western Michigan vs. #2 Toledo	ESPN2
* Game times in ET. # Rankings denote tournament seed

== Bracket ==
First round Monday, March 10, 2014
12	Ball State	64
5	Ohio	76
9	Kent State	64
8	Miami (OH)	71
11	Central Michigan	60
6	Eastern Michigan	72
10	Bowling Green	51
7	Northern Illinois	54

Second round Wednesday, March 12, 2014; TWCSC (Ohio)
5	Ohio	63
8	Miami (OH)	55
6	Eastern Michigan	53
7	Northern Illinois	48

Quarterfinals; Thursday, Match 13, 2014; TWCSC
4	Akron	83
5	Ohio	77
3	Buffalo	64
6	Eastern Michigan	69

Semifinals; Friday, March 14, 2014; TWCSC
1	Western Michigan	64*
4	Akron	60
2	Toledo	59
6	Eastern Michigan	44

Championship Game; Saturday, March 15, 2014; ESPN2
1	Western Michigan	98
2	Toledo	77
