= 2013–14 Toledo Rockets men's basketball team =

American college basketball season

2013–14 Toledo Rockets men's basketball

MAC West Division co-champions MAC regular season co-champions

NIT First round vs. Southern Miss, L 59–66
- Conference: Mid-American Conference
- West Division
- Record: 27–7 (14–4 MAC)
- Head coach: Tod Kowalczyk (4th season)
- Assistant coaches: Jason Kaslow; Jason Kemp; Jordan Mincy (1st season)
- Home arena: Savage Arena

2013–14 Mid-American Conference men's basketball standings
	Conf.				Overall
Team	W		L	PCT	W		L	PCT
East
Buffalo	13	–	5	.722	19	–	10	.655
Akron	12	–	6	.667	21	–	13	.618
Ohio	11	–	7	.611	25	–	12	.676
Miami	8	–	10	.444	13	–	18	.419
Kent State	7	–	11	.389	16	–	16	.500
Bowling Green	6	–	12	.333	12	–	20	.375
West
Toledo	14	–	4	.778	27	–	7	.794
Western Michigan †	14	–	4	.778	23	–	10	.697
Eastern Michigan	10	–	8	.556	22	–	15	.595
Northern Illinois	8	–	10	.444	15	–	17	.469
Central Michigan	3	–	15	.167	10	–	21	.323
Ball State	2	–	16	.111	5	–	25	.167
† 2014 MAC tournament winner

The 2013–14 Toledo Rockets men's basketball team represented the University of Toledo during the 2013–14 NCAA Division I men's basketball season. The Rockets, led by fourth-fyear head coach Tod Kowalczyk, played their home games at the Savage Arena as members of the West Division of the Mid-American Conference. After sitting out the postseason in 2012–13 due to low APR scores, the Rockets became eligible for the MAC and NCAA Tournaments in 2013–14. They finished the season 27–7, 14–4 in MAC play to finish in a share for the West Division championship and the #1 overall seed in the MAC tournament. They advanced to the MAC championship game, where they lost to Western Michigan. As the MAC #1 seed who failed to win the conference tournament, the received an automatic bid to the National Invitation Tournament, where they lost in the first round to Southern Miss.

== Season ==
=== Preseason ===
The Rockets announced their complete season schedule on September 3, 2013. The Rockets' non-conference schedule was highlighted by a trip to Detroit for a 2K Sports Classic subregional. Trips to Boston College, Robert Morris, and Kansas also were scheduled. For the conference slate, the Rockets scheduled home-and-home series with Ball State, Central Michigan, Eastern Michigan, Northern Illinois, Western Michigan, Ohio, and Bowling Green, while hosting Buffalo and Kent State and visiting Akron and Miami.

== Roster ==
2013–14 Toledo Rockets men's basketball team
Players
Coaches

Pos.	#	Name	Height	Weight	Year	Previous school	Hometown
G	1	Jonathan Williams	6 ft 3 in (1.91 m)	180 lb (82 kg)	Fr	Southfield-Lathrup HS	Southfield, Michigan
G/F	4	Justin Drummond	6 ft 4 in (1.93 m)	187 lb (85 kg)	Jr	Riverdale Baptist School; Loyola (MD)	Bowie, Maryland
G	5	Rian Pearson	6 ft 4 in (1.93 m)	190 lb (86 kg)	Sr	Raytown South HS; Green Bay	Raytown, Missouri
G	11	Josh Lemons	6 ft 0 in (1.83 m)	175 lb (79 kg)	So	La Salle HS	Cincinnati, Ohio
F	15	Aubrey Williams	6 ft 7 in (2.01 m)	215 lb (98 kg)	RS Fr	IMG Academy	Bowie, Maryland
G	20	Julius Brown	5 ft 10 in (1.78 m)	175 lb (79 kg)	Jr	Hillcrest HS	Markham, Illinois
G	22	Angel Aparicio	6 ft 5 in (1.96 m)	190 lb (86 kg)	So	Leo XIII HS	Benicarló, Spain
F	24	J. D. Weatherspoon	6 ft 6 in (1.98 m)	215 lb (98 kg)	Jr	North HS; Ohio State	Columbus, Ohio
G	25	Jordan Lauf	6 ft 5 in (1.96 m)	190 lb (86 kg)	Fr	Napoleon HS	Napoleon, Ohio
G	30	Donald Beatty	6 ft 3 in (1.91 m)	195 lb (88 kg)	Sr	Belmont HS	Dayton, Ohio
C	33	Zach Garber	6 ft 9 in (2.06 m)	225 lb (102 kg)	Fr	Vanlue HS	Carey, Ohio
F	43	Matt Smith	6 ft 7 in (2.01 m)	225 lb (102 kg)	Sr	Whitewright HS; Green Bay	Whitewright, Texas
C	53	Nathan Boothe	6 ft 9 in (2.06 m)	250 lb (113 kg)	So	Warren Township HS	Gurnee, Illinois

Head coach

- Tod Kowalczyk (Minnesota Duluth)

Assistant coach(es)

- Jason Kaslow (Wisconsin–Stevens Point)
- Jason Kemp (Wisconsin–La Crosse)
- Jordan Mincy (Kent State)

Legend

- (C) Team captain
- (S) Suspended
- (I) Ineligible
- (W) Walk-on
- Injured
- Current redshirt

== Schedule and results ==
Date time, TV	Rank^{#}	Opponent^{#}	Result	Record	Site (attendance) city, state
Exhibition
11/3/2013*; 3:30 pm		Hillsdale	W 85–84 ^{OT}		Savage Arena (N/A); Toledo, Ohio
Non-conference games
11/9/2013*; 7:00 pm		Northwestern Ohio	W 102–55	1–0	Savage Arena (3,971); Toledo, Ohio
11/14/2013*; 7:00 pm		at Boston College	W 95–92	2–0	Conte Forum (3,538); Chestnut Hill, Massachusetts
11/18/2013*; 7:00 pm		Florida A&M	W 79–69	3–0	Savage Arena (3,916); Toledo, Ohio
11/22/2013*; 4:30 pm		vs. Stony Brook; 2K Sports Classic	W 103–99	4–0	Calihan Hall (2,221); Detroit, Michigan
11/23/2013*; 5:30 pm		at Detroit; 2K Sports Classic	W 80–78	5–0	Calihan Hall (2,230); Detroit, Michigan
11/24/2013*; 1:30 pm		vs. Florida Atlantic; 2K Sports Classic	W 94–74	6–0	Calihan Hall (1,669); Detroit, Michigan
12/4/2013*; 7:00 pm		Detroit	W 91–75	7–0	Savage Arena (4,357); Toledo, Ohio
12/7/2013*; 4:00 pm		at Robert Morris	W 80–77	8–0	Charles L. Sewall Center (804); Moon Township, Pennsylvania
12/14/2013*; 1:00 pm		Sam Houston State	W 77–61	9–0	Savage Arena (3,602); Toledo, Ohio
12/17/2013*; 8:00 pm		at Arkansas State	W 78–65	10–0	Convocation Center (2,077); Jonesboro, Arkansas
12/21/2013*; 2:00 pm, BCSN		Cleveland State	W 71–67	11–0	Savage Arena (4,207); Toledo, Ohio
12/28/2013*; 2:00 pm		Coppin State	W 85–66	12–0	Savage Arena (4,632); Toledo, Ohio
12/30/2013*; 8:00 pm, ESPN3		at No. 16 Kansas	L 83–93	12–1	Allen Fieldhouse (16,300); Lawrence, Kansas
Conference games
1/8/2014; 7:00 pm		at Western Michigan	L 76–87	12–2 (0–1)	University Arena (2,482); Kalamazoo, Michigan
1/11/2014; 6:00 pm		Central Michigan	W 86–71	13–2 (1–1)	Savage Arena (6,189); Toledo, Ohio
1/15/2014; 7:00 pm		Buffalo	W 67–65	14–2 (2–1)	Savage Arena (4,595); Toledo, Ohio
1/18/2014; 11:00 am, ESPNU		at Akron	W 75–61	15–2 (3–1)	James A. Rhodes Arena (4,596); Akron, Ohio
1/22/2014; 7:00 pm		Northern Illinois	W 77–68	16–2 (4–1)	Savage Arena (4,335); Toledo, Ohio
1/26/2014; 6:00 pm, ESPN3		Kent State	W 81–78	17–2 (5–1)	Savage Arena (5,611); Toledo, Ohio
1/29/2014; 7:00 pm		at Miami (OH)	W 83–70	18–2 (6–1)	Millett Hall (1,448); Oxford, Ohio
2/1/2014; 1:00 pm, ESPNU		at Ohio	L 90–95 ^{OT}	18–3 (6–2)	Convocation Center (9,173); Athens, Ohio
2/5/2014; 7:00 pm		Bowling Green	W 83–76	19–3 (7–2)	Savage Arena (6,031); Toledo, Ohio
2/8/2014; 2:00 pm		at Ball State	W 80–73	20–3 (8–2)	John E. Worthen Arena (2,722); Muncie, Indiana
2/12/2014; 7:00 pm, ESPN3		Ohio	W 82–76	21–3 (9–2)	Savage Arena (5,849); Toledo, Ohio
2/15/2014; 2:00 pm		at Eastern Michigan	L 44–65	21–4 (9–3)	Convocation Center (1,356); Ypsilanti, Michigan
2/20/2014; 9:00 pm, ESPNU		at Bowling Green	W 60–58	22–4 (10–3)	Stroh Center (3,182); Bowling Green, Ohio
2/23/2014; 6:00 pm, ESPN3		Ball State	W 85–74	23–4 (11–3)	Savage Arena (4,912); Toledo, Ohio
2/26/2014; 8:00 pm		at Northern Illinois	L 66–74	23–5 (11–4)	Convocation Center (1,254); DeKalb, Illinois
3/1/2014; 6:00 pm, ESPN3		Western Michigan	W 96–85 ^{OT}	24–5 (12–4)	Savage Arena (6,912); Toledo, Ohio
3/4/2014; 7:00 pm		at Central Michigan	W 73 – 69	25–5 (13–4)	McGuirk Arena (1,713); Mount Pleasant, Michigan
3/8/2014; 2:00 pm		Eastern Michigan	W 77-66	26–5 (14–4)	Savage Arena (5,911); Toledo, Ohio
MAC tournament
3/14/2014; 9:00 pm		vs. Eastern Michigan; Semifinals	W 59–44	27–5	Quicken Loans Arena (6,318); Cleveland, Ohio
3/15/2014; 6:30 pm, ESPN2		vs. Western Michigan; Championship	L 77–98	27–6	Quicken Loans Arena (5,278); Cleveland, Ohio
NIT
3/19/2014*; 8:30 pm, ESPN3	No. (6)	at (3) Southern Miss; First round	L 59–66	27–7	Reed Green Coliseum (4,054); Hattiesburg, Mississippi
*Non-conference game. ^{#}Rankings from AP Poll, (#) during NIT is seed within region. (#) Tournament seedings in parentheses. All times are in Eastern.
