= 2013–14 Eastern Michigan Eagles men's basketball team =

American college basketball season

2013–14 Eastern Michigan Eagles men's basketball

Keightley Classic Runner-Up

CIT Second round vs. Columbia, L 56–69
- Conference: Mid-American Conference
- West Division
- Record: 22–15 (10–8 MAC)
- Head coach: Rob Murphy (3rd season)
- Assistant coaches: Mike Brown; Kevin Mondro; Benny White
- Home arena: Eastern Michigan University Convocation Center

2013–14 Mid-American Conference men's basketball standings
	Conf.				Overall
Team	W		L	PCT	W		L	PCT
East
Buffalo	13	–	5	.722	19	–	10	.655
Akron	12	–	6	.667	21	–	13	.618
Ohio	11	–	7	.611	25	–	12	.676
Miami	8	–	10	.444	13	–	18	.419
Kent State	7	–	11	.389	16	–	16	.500
Bowling Green	6	–	12	.333	12	–	20	.375
West
Toledo	14	–	4	.778	27	–	7	.794
Western Michigan †	14	–	4	.778	23	–	10	.697
Eastern Michigan	10	–	8	.556	22	–	15	.595
Northern Illinois	8	–	10	.444	15	–	17	.469
Central Michigan	3	–	15	.167	10	–	21	.323
Ball State	2	–	16	.111	5	–	25	.167
† 2014 MAC tournament winner

The 2013–14 Eastern Michigan Eagles men's basketball team represented Eastern Michigan University during the 2013–14 NCAA Division I men's basketball season. The Eagles, led by third year head coach Rob Murphy, played their home games at the Eastern Michigan University Convocation Center and were members of the West Division of the Mid-American Conference. They finished the season 22–15, 10–8 in MAC play to finish in third place in the West Division. They advanced to the semifinals of the MAC tournament where they lost to Toledo. They were invited to the CollegeInsider.com Tournament where they defeated Norfolk State in the first round before losing in the second round to Columbia.

== Arrivals ==
- Olalekan Ajayi transferred from Collin College in Plano, TX. While at Collin Ajayi ranked 17th in the nation in rebounding and was rated as the 11th best junior college player according to rivals.com.
- Ali Farhat a freshman walk-on from Dearborn HS where he was a four time All-City award winner, three time All-League and during his senior year earned All-State accolades and named to the All-Metro West Second team.
- Darell Combs joined EMU from Blinn College in Brenham, TX. Last season he led his team in points, with a 16.8pts per game average.
- Mo Hughley is a graduate student transfer from CSU-Baskersfield. Before that he was named honorable mention NCJAA All-Region and ranked 8th in Region XIV in rebounding at Paris Junior College.
- Jordan Martin a walk-on from Oakland Community College. Was a First Team All-Eastern Collegiate Conference award winner.
- Jodan Price will have to sit out the 2013/14 after transferring from DePaul University.Ranked 143rd overall on Rivals.Ranked among the class of 2012’s top-25 three-point shooters by ESPN.com in high school.
- Trent Perry another walk-on, attended Independence HS in Thompson Station, TN. In high school Perry was named to the District 11AAA All-Tournament Team and earned John Maher Student-Athlete of the Month.
- Karrington Ward a transfer from Moraine Valley CC where he was named Skyway Conference Player of the Year and was a Division 1 National Junior College Athletic Association All-American. While at Kankakee Community College he earned Division II First Team National Junior College Athletic Association All-American status.

== Departures ==
Name	Yr	Pos	Reason
Derek Thompson	Sr	G	Graduated
J.R. Sims	Sr	G	Graduated
Jamell Harris	Sr	F	Graduated
Austin Harper	Jr	G	Transferred Out
Matt Balkema	Sr	C	Graduated
Antoine Chandler	So	G	Transferred Out
Josh Lyle	Jr	F	Transferred Out

== Awards ==
Academic All-MAC

- Daylen Harrison,3.66 GPA, Chemistry

Ben Jobe Award

- Rob Murphy was a finalist

MAC West Players of the Week

- Dec 16 Raven Lee
- Feb 17 Da'Shonte Riley

Hustlebelt.com Preseason Top 25 MAC Players

- 10 Glenn Bryant
- 25 Daylen Harrison
- Honorable Mention-Mike Talley

MAC Defensive Player Of The Year

- Da'Shonte Riley

3rd Team All-MAC

- Karrington Ward

== Statistics ==
National Statistical Champions

- 2013/14 NCAA Statistical Championship for Field Goal Percentage Defense (36.9%)

MAC Statistical Champions

- 2013/14 Scoring Defense (61.4)
- 2013/14 Field Goal Percentage Defense (.369)
- 2013/14 Blocked Shots (6 Avg/G)
- 2013/14 Turnover Maring (+3.57)

== Roster ==
2013–14 Eastern Michigan Eagles men's basketball team
Players
Coaches

Pos.	#	Name	Height	Weight	Year	Hometown
G	0	Raven Lee	6 ft 3 in (1.91 m)	170 lb (77 kg)	RS Fr	Detroit, Michigan
G	1	Mike Talley	5 ft 11 in (1.8 m)	175 lb (79 kg)	RS Jr	Detroit, Michigan
G	2	J.R. Sims	6 ft 3 in (1.91 m)	175 lb (79 kg)	RS Sr	Fort Wayne, Indiana
F	3	Mo Hughley	6 ft 7 in (2.01 m)	240 lb (109 kg)	Sr	Queens Village, New York
G	5	Jodan Price	6 ft 7 in (2.01 m)	172 lb (78 kg)	RS So	Indianapolis, Indiana
C	10	Da'Shonte Riley	7 ft 0 in (2.13 m)	240 lb (109 kg)	RS Sr	Detroit, Michigan
F	12	Olalekan Ajayi	6 ft 11 in (2.11 m)	245 lb (111 kg)	So	Winston-Salem, North Carolina
G	13	Trent Perry	6 ft 4 in (1.93 m)	175 lb (79 kg)	Fr	Irving, Texas
F	14	Karrington Ward	6 ft 7 in (2.01 m)	180 lb (82 kg)	Jr	Lockport, Illinois
G	20	Ali Farhat	6 ft 0 in (1.83 m)	165 lb (75 kg)	Fr	Dearborn, Michigan
G	21	Jalen Ross	5 ft 11 in (1.8 m)	175 lb (79 kg)	So	Greensboro, North Carolina
G	22	Jordan Martin	6 ft 3 in (1.91 m)	195 lb (88 kg)	Jr	Detroit, Michigan
F	23	Glenn Bryant	6 ft 8 in (2.03 m)	210 lb (95 kg)	RS Sr	Detroit, Michigan
G	25	Darell Combs	6 ft 2 in (1.88 m)	175 lb (79 kg)	So	Chicago, Illinois
G	33	Anthony Strickland	6 ft 5 in (1.96 m)	220 lb (100 kg)	RS Sr	Ypsilanti, Michigan
G	35	Daylen Harrison	6 ft 6 in (1.98 m)	215 lb (98 kg)	RS Sr	Akron, Ohio

Head coach

Rob Murphy (Central State)

Assistant coach(es)

- Mike Brown (Wayne State)
- Kevin Mondro (Detroit Mercy)
- Benny White (Michigan State)

Legend

- (C) Team captain
- (S) Suspended
- (I) Ineligible
- (W) Walk-on
- Injured
- Current redshirt

Roster

== Schedule ==
Date time, TV	Opponent	Result	Record	Site (attendance) city, state
Exhibition
11/04/2013*; 7:00 pm	Marygrove	W 101–38		Convocation Center; Ypsilanti, MI
Regular season
11/08/2013*; 12:00 pm	Albion	W 77–45	1–0	Convocation Center (2,677); Ypsilanti, MI
11/12/2013*; 7:00 pm	Concordia	W 95–50	2–0	Bowen Field House (506); Ypsilanti, MI
11/14/2013*; 7:30 pm	Robert Morris; Keightley Classic Game	W 69–64	3–0	Bowen Field House (793); Ypsilanti, MI
11/18/2013*; 7:00 pm	Cleveland State; Keightley Classic Game	W 81–69	4–0	Convocation Center (825); Ypsilanti, MI
11/23/2013*; 7:00 pm	Texas–Arlington; Keightley Classic Game	W 74–69	5–0	Convocation Center (810); Ypsilanti, MI
11/27/2013*; 4:00 pm, FSN	at No. 3 Kentucky; Keightley Classic Game	L 63–81	5–1	Rupp Arena (22,721); Lexington, Kentucky
12/3/2013*; 7:00 pm	No. 21 Massachusetts	L 57–69	5–2	Convocation Center (1,314); Ypsilanti, MI
12/7/2013*; 2:00 pm, ESPN3	at Purdue	L 64–69	5–3	Mackey Arena (13,079); West Lafayette, Indiana
12/10/2013*; 7:00 pm	Green Bay	W 67–58	6–3	Convocation Center (583); Ypsilanti, MI
12/21/2013*; 1:00 pm	at Oakland	W 81–79 ^{OT}	7–3	Athletics Center O'rena (1,507); Rochester, Michigan
12/28/2013*; 2:00 pm, ESPN2	at No. 9 Duke	L 59–82	7–4	Cameron Indoor Stadium (9,314); Durham, North Carolina
12/31/2013*; 3:00 pm, ESPNU	at No. 2 Syracuse	L 48–70	7–5	Carrier Dome (20,306); Syracuse, New York
1/4/2014*; 2:00 pm	Rochester	W 92–54	8–5	Convocation Center (429); Ypsilanti, MI
1/8/2014; 4:00 pm	at Bowling Green	W 56–51	9–5 (1–0)	Stroh Center (1,205); Bowling Green, Ohio
01/11/2014; 2:00 pm	at Buffalo	L 66–76	9–6 (1–1)	Alumni Arena (2,616); Amherst, New York
01/14/2014; 7:00 pm, TWCSC Ohio	Western Michigan; Michigan MAC Trophy	W 56–37	10–6 (2–1)	Convocation Center (1,049); Ypsilanti, MI
01/18/2014; 7:00 pm	at Central Michigan; Michigan MAC Trophy	W 72–59	11–6 (3–1)	McGuirk Arena (2,428); Mount Pleasant, Michigan
01/22/2014; 7:00 pm, ESPN3	Akron	L 68–78	11–7 (3–2)	Convocation Center (609); Ypsilanti, MI
01/25/2014; 7:00 pm	Ohio; ESPNU	L 56–58	11–8 (3–3)	Convocation Center (1,321); Ypsilanti, MI
01/29/2014; 7:00 pm	Bowling Green	W 69–57	12–8 (4–3)	Convocation Center (601); Ypsilanti, MI
02/1/2014; 3:00 pm	at Miami (OH)	L 61–65	12–9 (4–4)	Millett Hall (1,038); Oxford, Ohio
02/5/2014; 7:00 pm, ESPN3	at Akron	L 48–52	12–10 (4–5)	James A. Rhodes Arena (3,014); Akron, Ohio
02/08/2014; 2:00 pm	Kent State	W 70–53	13–10 (5–5)	Convocation Center (716); Ypsilanti, MI
02/12/2014; 7:00 pm	at Ball State	W 73–62	14–10 (6–5)	Convocation Center (2,411); Muncie, Indiana
02/15/2014; 2:00 pm	Toledo	W 65–44	15–10 (7–5)	Convocation Center (1,356); Ypsilanti, MI
02/20/2014; 7:00 pm, ESPN3	at Northern Illinois	L 59–61 ^{2OT}	15–11 (7–6)	Convocation Center (877); DeKalb, Illinois
02/23/2014; 2:00 pm	at Western Michigan; Michigan MAC Trophy	L 67–75	15–12 (7–7)	University Arena (3,204); Kalamazoo, Michigan
02/26/2014; 7:00 pm	Central Michigan; Michigan MAC Trophy	W 64–42	16–12 (8–7)	Convocation Center (571); Ypsilanti, MI
03/1/2014; 2:00 pm	Northern Illinois	W 56–52	17–12 (9–7)	Convocation Center (815); Ypsilanti, MI
03/4/2014; 7:00 pm, Ball State Sports Net	Ball State	W 72–58	18–12 (10–7)	Convocation Center (903); Ypsilanti, MI
03/8/2014; 2:00 pm	at Toledo	L 66–77	18–13 (10–8)	Savage Arena (5,911); Toledo, Ohio
MAC Tournament
03/10/2014; 7:30 pm	Central Michigan; First round	W 72–60	19–13	Convocation Center (863); Ypsilanti, MI
03/12/2014; 9:00 pm	vs. Northern Illinois; Second round	W 53–48	20–13	Quicken Loans Arena (513); Cleveland, Ohio
03/13/2014; 9:00 pm, TWCSC	vs. Buffalo; Quarterfinals	W 69–64	21–13	Quicken Loans Arena (4,116); Cleveland, Ohio
03/14/2014; 9:00 pm, TWCSC	vs. Toledo; Semifinals	L 44–59	21–14	Quicken Loans Arena (6,318); Cleveland, Ohio
CIT
03/18/2014*; 7:00 pm	Norfolk State; First round	W 58–54	22–14	Convocation Center (373); Ypsilanti, MI
03/22/2014*; 7:00 pm	at Columbia; Second round	L 56–69	22–15	Levien Gymnasium (2,019); New York City, NY
*Non-conference game. ^{#}Rankings from AP Poll. (#) Tournament seedings in parentheses. All times are in Eastern Time.
