= 2013–14 Buffalo Bulls men's basketball team =

American college basketball season

2013–14 Buffalo Bulls men's basketball

MAC East Division Champions
- Conference: Mid-American Conference
- East Division
- Record: 19–10 (13–5 MAC)
- Head coach: Bobby Hurley (1st season)
- Assistant coaches: Eric Harrield; Levi Watkins; Nate Oats
- Home arena: Alumni Arena

2013–14 Mid-American Conference men's basketball standings
	Conf.				Overall
Team	W		L	PCT	W		L	PCT
East
Buffalo	13	–	5	.722	19	–	10	.655
Akron	12	–	6	.667	21	–	13	.618
Ohio	11	–	7	.611	25	–	12	.676
Miami	8	–	10	.444	13	–	18	.419
Kent State	7	–	11	.389	16	–	16	.500
Bowling Green	6	–	12	.333	12	–	20	.375
West
Toledo	14	–	4	.778	27	–	7	.794
Western Michigan †	14	–	4	.778	23	–	10	.697
Eastern Michigan	10	–	8	.556	22	–	15	.595
Northern Illinois	8	–	10	.444	15	–	17	.469
Central Michigan	3	–	15	.167	10	–	21	.323
Ball State	2	–	16	.111	5	–	25	.167
† 2014 MAC tournament winner

The 2013–14 Buffalo Bulls men's basketball team represented the University at Buffalo, The State University of New York during the 2013–14 NCAA Division I men's basketball season. The Bulls, led by first year head coach Bobby Hurley, played their home games at Alumni Arena as members of the East Division of the Mid-American Conference. They finished the season 19–10, 13–5 in MAC play to be champions of the East division. They lost in the semifinals of the MAC tournament to Eastern Michigan. Despite the 19 wins and the division title, the Bulls did not participate in postseason play.

== Season ==
=== Preseason ===
Following the firing of previous head coach Reggie Witherspoon and departures of assistant coaches Turner Battle, Kevin Heck, and Jim Kwitchoff, Buffalo began the re-tooling of its staff by hiring Bobby Hurley, formerly the associate head coach at Rhode Island, as their 12th head coach in program history, on March 26, 2013. Prior to his time at Rhode Island, Hurley was an assistant coach for Wagner.

On April 12, 2013, Hurley announced that Levi Watkins and Eric Harrield would join the team as assistant coaches. Watkins, a former player for NC State, had spent the past eight years working for the Wolfpack in different parts of the team. Harrield joined the team after spending five years as an assistant coach for New York City high school basketball powerhouse St. Anthony's High School. On June 18, Nate Oats was hired to fill out the coaching staff. Oats joined the Bulls from another high school basketball powerhouse, Romulus High School in Michigan.

On September 16, 2013, Hurley announced the team's complete schedule for the season. The main highlight on the non-conference schedule was a game against rival Canisius at the First Niagara Center, home of the Buffalo Sabres of the National Hockey League. Other key non-conference games included a trip to Texas A&M (Buffalo's first game against an SEC opponent since 1976), and home games against South Dakota State and rival St. Bonaventure. In the conference schedule, the Bulls were to play home-and-home series with Akron, Bowling Green, Kent State, Miami, Ohio, Northern Illinois, and Ball State, while playing one game against Central Michigan, Western Michigan, Eastern Michigan, and Toledo.

=== November ===
On November 8, the Bulls opened their season in College Station, Texas, as visitors against Texas A&M. Bobby Hurley's head coaching debut was spoiled by a strong defensive performance by the Aggies, who outscored Buffalo 25–6 over the final ten minutes en route to an 82–58 victory. Star forward Javon McCrea led the Bulls with 14 points.

== Roster ==
2013–14 Buffalo Bulls men's basketball team
Players
Coaches

Pos.	#	Name	Height	Weight	Year	Previous school	Hometown
G	1	Joshua Freelove	6 ft 2 in (1.88 m)	180 lb (82 kg)	Sr	North Broward Prep; Toledo; Lewis and Clark CC; Alabama State	North Lauderdale, FL
F	2	Will Regan	6 ft 8 in (2.03 m)	230 lb (104 kg)	Jr	Nichols School; Virginia	Buffalo, NY
G	3	Jarod Oldham	6 ft 3 in (1.91 m)	185 lb (84 kg)	Sr	Eisenhower HS	Decatur, IL
F	4	Jamir Hanner	6 ft 8 in (2.03 m)	210 lb (95 kg)	Jr	Notre Dame Prep; Marshall	Philadelphia, PA
G	5	Corey Raley-Ross	6 ft 3 in (1.91 m)	195 lb (88 kg)	Sr	Harding HS	Charlotte, NC
G	10	Jarryn Skeete	6 ft 3 in (1.91 m)	175 lb (79 kg)	So	Wasatch Academy	Brampton, ON
G	11	Shannon Evans	6 ft 1 in (1.85 m)	170 lb (77 kg)	Fr	Nansemond River HS	Suffolk, VA
F	12	Javon McCrea	6 ft 7 in (2.01 m)	250 lb (113 kg)	Sr	Newark HS	Newark, NY
G	15	Deyshonee Much	6 ft 5 in (1.96 m)	170 lb (77 kg)	Fr	Gates Chili HS	Rochester, NY
G	22	Auraum Nuiriankh	6 ft 6 in (1.98 m)	200 lb (91 kg)	Sr	Arundel HS	Baltimore, MD
F	23	Justin Moss	6 ft 7 in (2.01 m)	240 lb (109 kg)	So	Romulus HS; Indian Hills CC	Detroit, MI
F	35	Xavier Ford	6 ft 7 in (2.01 m)	210 lb (95 kg)	Jr	Harrison HS	Colorado Springs, CO

Head coach

- Bobby Hurley (Duke)

Assistant coach(es)

- Eric Harrield (Virginia)
- Levi Watkins (NC State)
- Nate Oats (Maranatha)

Legend

- (C) Team captain
- (S) Suspended
- (I) Ineligible
- (W) Walk-on
- Injured
- Current redshirt

== Schedule and results ==
Date time, TV	Opponent	Result	Record	Site (attendance) city, state
Non-conference games
11/8/2013*; 8:00 pm	at Texas A&M	L 58–82	0–1	Reed Arena (4,969); College Station, TX
11/13/2013*; 7:00 pm	at Niagara	L 81–92	0–2	Gallagher Center (1,937); Lewiston, NY
11/16/2013*; 3:00 pm	West Virginia Wesleyan	W 80–60	1–2	Alumni Arena (3,568); Amherst, NY
11/26/2013*; 7:00 pm	Robert Morris	W 81–66	2–2	Alumni Arena (2,539); Amherst, NY
11/30/2013*; 2:00 pm	Delaware State	W 65–55	3–2	Alumni Arena (2,112); Amherst, NY
12/7/2013*; 2:00 pm	St. Bonaventure	W 78–73	4–2	Alumni Arena (4,652); Amherst, NY
12/11/2013*; 8:00 pm	vs. Canisius	L 55–69	4–3	First Niagara Center (4,703); Buffalo, NY
12/21/2013*; 2:30 pm	vs. Manhattan	L 81–84 ^{OT}	4–4	Barclays Center (11,039); Brooklyn, NY
12/23/2013*; 12:00 pm	Binghamton	W 87–57	5–4	Alumni Arena (3,136); Amherst, NY
12/29/2013*; 7:00 pm	at Drexel	W 55–52	6–4	Daskalakis Athletic Center (1,503); Philadelphia, PA
1/3/2014*; 7:00 pm	South Dakota State			Alumni Arena; Amherst, NY
Conference games
1/8/2014; 7:00 pm	Northern Illinois	W 67–46	7–4 (1–0)	Alumni Arena (1,520); Amherst, NY
1/11/2014; 2:00 pm	Eastern Michigan	W 76–66	8–4 (2–0)	Alumni Arena (2,616); Amherst, NY
1/15/2014; 7:00 pm	at Toledo	L 65–67	8–5 (2–1)	Savage Arena (4,595); Toledo, OH
1/18/2014; 2:30 pm	Kent State	W 71–60	9–5 (3–1)	Alumni Arena (3,347); Amherst, NY
1/23/2014; 7:00 pm	at Ball State	L 68–71	9–6 (3–2)	John E. Worthen Arena (3,072); Muncie, IN
1/25/2014; 2:00 pm	at Northern Illinois	W 75–67	10–6 (4–2)	Convocation Center (901); DeKalb, IL
1/29/2014; 7:00 pm	Western Michigan	W 84–63	11–6 (5–2)	Alumni Arena (3,052); Amherst, NY
2/2/2014; 2:00 pm	at Bowling Green	L 68–74	11–7 (5–3)	Stroh Center (1,456); Bowling Green, OH
2/5/2014; 7:00 pm	Ball State	W 69–48	12–7 (6–3)	Alumni Arena (2,558); Amherst, NY
2/8/2014; 7:00 pm	at Central Michigan	W 79–70	13–7 (7–3)	McGuirk Arena (1,955); Mount Pleasant, MI
2/12/2014; 7:00 pm	at Miami (OH)	W 75–62	14–7 (8–3)	Millett Hall (1,084); Oxford, OH
2/15/2014; 3:30 pm	Ohio	L 70–73	14–8 (8–4)	Alumni Arena (5,052); Amherst, NY
2/19/2014; 7:00 pm	Akron	W 96–90	15–8 (9–4)	Alumni Arena (3,579); Amherst, NY
2/22/2014; 12:00 pm	at Kent State	W 78–69	16–8 (10–4)	MAC Center (3,104); Kent, OH
2/26/2014; 7:00 pm	at Ohio	W 69–64	17–8 (11–4)	Convocation Center (6,283); Athens, OH
3/1/2014; 2:00 pm, ESPN3	Miami (OH)	W 78–55	18–8 (12–4)	Alumni Arena (4,402); Amherst, NY
3/4/2014; 7:00 pm, ESPN3	at Akron	L 71–83	18–9 (12–5)	James A. Rhodes Arena (3,220); Akron, OH
3/8/2014; 2:30 pm	Bowling Green	W 88–55	19–9 (13–5)	Alumni Arena (5,452); Amherst, NY
MAC tournament
03/13/2014; 9:00 pm, TWCSC (Ohio)	vs. Eastern Michigan; Quarterfinals	L 64–69	19–10	Quicken Loans Arena (4,116); Cleveland, OH
*Non-conference game. ^{#}Rankings from AP Poll. (#) Tournament seedings in parentheses. All times are in Eastern.
