= 2013–14 Central Michigan Chippewas men's basketball team =

American college basketball season

2013–14 Central Michigan Chippewas men's basketball
- Conference: Mid-American Conference
- West Division
- Record: 10–21 (3–15 MAC)
- Head coach: Keno Davis (2nd season)
- Assistant coaches: Kevin Gamble; Jeff Smith; Kyle Gerdeman
- Home arena: McGuirk Arena

2013–14 Mid-American Conference men's basketball standings
	Conf.				Overall
Team	W		L	PCT	W		L	PCT
East
Buffalo	13	–	5	.722	19	–	10	.655
Akron	12	–	6	.667	21	–	13	.618
Ohio	11	–	7	.611	25	–	12	.676
Miami	8	–	10	.444	13	–	18	.419
Kent State	7	–	11	.389	16	–	16	.500
Bowling Green	6	–	12	.333	12	–	20	.375
West
Toledo	14	–	4	.778	27	–	7	.794
Western Michigan †	14	–	4	.778	23	–	10	.697
Eastern Michigan	10	–	8	.556	22	–	15	.595
Northern Illinois	8	–	10	.444	15	–	17	.469
Central Michigan	3	–	15	.167	10	–	21	.323
Ball State	2	–	16	.111	5	–	25	.167
† 2014 MAC tournament winner

The 2013–14 Central Michigan Chippewas men's basketball team represented Central Michigan University during the 2013–14 NCAA Division I men's basketball season. The Chippewas, led by second year head coach Keno Davis, played their home games at the McGuirk Arena as members of the West Division of the Mid-American Conference. They finished the season 10–21, 3–15 in MAC play to finish in fifth place in the West Division. They lost in the first round of the MAC tournament to Eastern Michigan.

== Season ==
=== Preseason ===
Head coach Keno Davis announced the Chippewas' season schedule on September 3, 2013. The main highlight of the schedule was the first ever Central Michigan Tournament, with Montana State, Austin Peay, and Cal State Northridge participating. The Chippewas also schedule to visit Atlantic 10 squad Dayton. For the conference schedule, the Chippewas scheduled home-and-home series with Ball State, Eastern Michigan, Northern Illinois, Toledo, Western Michigan, Miami, and Kent State, while hosting Buffalo and Akron and visiting Ohio and Bowling Green.

=== November ===
The Chippewas opened the regular season on November 8, 2013, with a dominating win over Division III opponent Manchester. John Simons scored 27 points to lead the Chippewas to a 101–49 victory.

== Roster ==
2013–14 Central Michigan Chippewas men's basketball team
Players
Coaches

Pos.	#	Name	Height	Weight	Year	Previous school	Hometown
G	0	Braylon Rayson	5 ft 9 in (1.75 m)	178 lb (81 kg)	Fr	West Mesquite HS	Dallas, TX
G/F	1	Spencer Krannitz	6 ft 4 in (1.93 m)	196 lb (89 kg)	So	North Muskegon HS	North Muskegon, MI
G/F	2	DeAndray Buckley	6 ft 4 in (1.93 m)	209 lb (95 kg)	Sr	Romulus HS; Indian Hills CC	Romulus, MI
G	3	Derrick Richardson, Jr.	6 ft 4 in (1.93 m)	200 lb (91 kg)	So	Ypsilanti HS	Ypsilanti, MI
G	4	Rayshawn Simmons	6 ft 4 in (1.93 m)	182 lb (83 kg)	So	Moberly Area CC	St. Louis, MO
G	5	Sheldon Lowman	6 ft 1 in (1.85 m)	177 lb (80 kg)	Jr	Mid Michigan CC	Detroit, MI
G	10	Austin Stewart	6 ft 6 in (1.98 m)	207 lb (94 kg)	So	West HS	Normal, IL
C	11	Milos Cabarkapa	7 ft 0 in (2.13 m)	233 lb (106 kg)	Fr	Impact Academy	Belgrade, Serbia
G	12	Josh Kozinski	6 ft 4 in (1.93 m)	180 lb (82 kg)	Fr	Edwardsburg HS	Edwardsburg, MI
G	15	Chris Fowler	6 ft 1 in (1.85 m)	189 lb (86 kg)	So	Detroit Country Day School	Southfield, MI
G	30	Austin Keel	6 ft 3 in (1.91 m)	185 lb (84 kg)	Jr	Winter Park HS	Winter Springs, FL
F	32	Blake Hibbitts	6 ft 7 in (2.01 m)	224 lb (102 kg)	So	Hudsonville HS	Hudsonville, MI
F	34	John Simons	6 ft 8 in (2.03 m)	228 lb (103 kg)	So	Cadillac HS	Cadillac, MI
G/F	35	Nick Carlos	6 ft 7 in (2.01 m)	191 lb (87 kg)	Fr	Southern Boone HS	Ashland, MO
F	41	Zach Saylor	6 ft 8 in (2.03 m)	235 lb (107 kg)	Sr	Waverly HS	Lansing, MI

Head coach

- Keno Davis (Iowa)

Assistant coach(es)

- Kevin Gamble (Iowa)
- Jeff Smith (Southeast Missouri State)
- Kyle Gerdeman (Alma)

Legend

- (C) Team captain
- (S) Suspended
- (I) Ineligible
- (W) Walk-on
- Injured
- Current redshirt

== Schedule and results ==
Date time, TV	Opponent	Result	Record	Site (attendance) city, state
Exhibition
10/28/2013*; 7:00 pm	Lake Superior State	W 92–88 ^{OT}	–	McGuirk Arena (N/A); Mount Pleasant, MI
Non-conference games
11/08/2013*; 2:30 pm	Manchester	W 101–49	1–0	McGuirk Arena (N/A); Mount Pleasant, MI
11/12/2013*; 8:00 pm	at Bradley	L 70–80	1–1	Carver Arena (6,334); Peoria, IL
11/16/2013*; 6:30 pm	Pepperdine	L 71–88	1–2	McGuirk Arena (1,593); Mount Pleasant, MI
11/21/2013*; 7:00 pm	Austin Peay; Central Michigan Tournament	W 90–75	2–2	McGuirk Arena (1,252); Mount Pleasant, MI
11/22/2013*; 7:00 pm	Montana State; Central Michigan Tournament	L 54–59	2–3	McGuirk Arena (1,539); Mount Pleasant, MI
11/23/2013*; 7:30 pm	Cal State Northridge; Central Michigan Tournament	W 90–76	3–3	McGuirk Arena (1,575); Mount Pleasant, MI
11/26/2013*; 8:00 pm	at Texas A&M–Corpus Christi	W 68–64	4–3	American Bank Center (1,081); Corpus Christi, TX
11/30/2013*; 7:00 pm	Jacksonville State	W 66–61	5–3	McGuirk Arena (769); Mount Pleasant, MI
12/07/2013*; 8:00 pm	at SIU Edwardsville	W 65–64	6–3	Vadalabene Center (2,116); Edwardsville, IL
12/14/2013*; 7:00 pm, TWCS	at Dayton	L 58–84	6–4	University of Dayton Arena (12,153); Dayton, OH
12/17/2013*; 7:45 pm	at Jacksonville State	L 73–82	6–5	Pete Mathews Coliseum (2,143); Jacksonville, AL
01/03/2014*; 7:00 pm	Marygrove	W 127–44	7–5	McGuirk Arena (1,579); Mount Pleasant, MI
Conference games
01/08/2014; 7:00 pm	Miami (OH)	L 70–77	7–6 (0–1)	McGuirk Arena (1,592); Mount Pleasant, MI
01/11/2014; 6:00 pm, ESPN3	at Toledo	L 71–86	7–7 (0–2)	Savage Arena (6,189); Toledo, OH
01/15/2014; 7:00 pm	at Bowling Green	L 57–67	7–8 (0–3)	Stroh Center (1,427); Bowling Green, OH
01/18/2014; 7:00 pm	Eastern Michigan	L 59–72	7–9 (0–4)	McGuirk Arena (2,428); Mount Pleasant, MI
01/22/2014; 7:00 pm	at Miami (OH)	L 80–86	7–10 (0–5)	Millett Hall (746); Oxford, OH
01/25/2014; 7:00 pm	Akron	L 74–82	7–11 (0–6)	McGuirk Arena (2,039); Mount Pleasant, MI
01/29/2014; 7:00 pm	at Ohio	L 67–71	7–12 (0–7)	Convocation Center (5,438); Athens, OH
02/01/2014; 2:00 pm	at Western Michigan	L 72–75	7–13 (0–8)	University Arena (3,504); Kalamazoo, MI
02/05/2014; 7:00 pm	Kent State	W 78–73 ^{OT}	8–13 (1–8)	McGuirk Arena (1,743); Mount Pleasant, MI
02/08/2014; 7:00 pm	Buffalo	L 70–79	8–14 (1–9)	McGuirk Arena (1,955); Mount Pleasant, MI
02/12/2014; 8:00 pm	at Northern Illinois	L 63–88	8–15 (1–10)	Convocation Center (773); DeKalb, IL
02/15/2014; 6:00 pm, ESPN3	at Kent State	L 75–83	8–16 (1–11)	MAC Center (2,528); Kent, OH
02/19/2014; 7:00 pm	Ball State	W 101–95 ^{3OT}	9–16 (2–11)	McGuirk Arena (1,673); Mount Pleasant, MI
02/23/2014; 2:00 pm, WCMU	Northern Illinois	W 70–67	10–16 (3–11)	McGuirk Arena (1,797); Mount Pleasant, MI
02/26/2014; 7:00 pm	at Eastern Michigan	L 42–64	10–17 (3–12)	Convocation Center (571); Ypsilanti, MI
03/01/2014; 2:00 pm	at Ball State	L 71–74	10–18 (3–13)	John E. Worthen Arena (3,125); Muncie, IN
03/04/2014; 7:00 pm	Toledo	L 69–73	10–19 (3–14)	McGuirk Arena (1,713); Mount Pleasant, MI
03/08/2014; 7:00 pm	Western Michigan	L 64–78	10–20 (3–15)	McGuirk Arena (2,087); Mount Pleasant, MI
2014 MAC tournament
03/10/2014; 7:30 pm	Eastern Michigan; First round	L 60–72	10–21	Convocation Center (863); Ypsilanti, MI
*Non-conference game. ^{#}Rankings from AP Poll. (#) Tournament seedings in parentheses. All times are in Eastern.

== See also ==
- 2013–14 NCAA Division I men's basketball season
- 2013–14 NCAA Division I men's basketball rankings
