= 2013–14 Bowling Green Falcons men's basketball team =

American college basketball season

2013–14 Bowling Green Falcons men's basketball
- Conference: Mid-American Conference
- East Division
- Record: 12–20 (6–12 MAC)
- Head coach: Louis Orr (7th season)
- Assistant coaches: LaMonta Stone; Louis Twigg; Dennis Hopson
- Home arena: Stroh Center

2013–14 Mid-American Conference men's basketball standings
	Conf.				Overall
Team	W		L	PCT	W		L	PCT
East
Buffalo	13	–	5	.722	19	–	10	.655
Akron	12	–	6	.667	21	–	13	.618
Ohio	11	–	7	.611	25	–	12	.676
Miami	8	–	10	.444	13	–	18	.419
Kent State	7	–	11	.389	16	–	16	.500
Bowling Green	6	–	12	.333	12	–	20	.375
West
Toledo	14	–	4	.778	27	–	7	.794
Western Michigan †	14	–	4	.778	23	–	10	.697
Eastern Michigan	10	–	8	.556	22	–	15	.595
Northern Illinois	8	–	10	.444	15	–	17	.469
Central Michigan	3	–	15	.167	10	–	21	.323
Ball State	2	–	16	.111	5	–	25	.167
† 2014 MAC tournament winner

The 2013–14 Bowling Green Falcons men's basketball team represented Bowling Green State University during the 2013–14 NCAA Division I men's basketball season. The Falcons, led by seventh year head coach Louis Orr, played their home games at the Stroh Center as members of the East Division of the Mid-American Conference. They finished the season 12–20, 6–12 in MAC play to finish in last place in the East Division. They lost in the first round of the MAC tournament to Northern Illinois.

== Season ==
=== Preseason ===
The Falcons announced their full season schedule on September 3, 2013. Key non-conference games included a trip to the Cancún Challenge to face teams such as Wisconsin and Saint Louis. Another key non-conference game was a trip to Xavier. For the MAC schedule, the Falcons schedule home-and-home series with Eastern Michigan, Kent State, Toledo, Buffalo, Akron, Ohio, and Miami. Western Michigan, Central Michigan, Northern Illinois, and Ball State were to be played once each.

Bowling Green opened the season with an exhibition victory over Malone, dominating throughout en route to an 87–60.

=== November ===
The Falcons opened the regular season on November 9 with a dominating victory over Division III Earlham College, winning 102–49. Jehvon Clarke led the charge for Bowling Green with 17 points, eight assists, and six steals in the win.

== Roster ==
2013–14 Bowling Green Falcons men's basketball team
Players
Coaches

Pos.	#	Name	Height	Weight	Year	Previous school	Hometown
C	0	Josh Gomez	6 ft 10 in (2.08 m)	226 lb (103 kg)	RS So	Rice HS; Iona	Bronx, NY
G	1	JD Tisdale	6 ft 4 in (1.93 m)	177 lb (80 kg)	Fr	Swartz Creek HS	Flint, MI
G	2	Anthony Hernderson	6 ft 1 in (1.85 m)	178 lb (81 kg)	RS Jr	Start HS	Toledo, OH
F	3	Spencer Parker	6 ft 7 in (2.01 m)	202 lb (92 kg)	So	West Bloomfield HS	West Bloomfield, MI
G	4	Zack Denny	6 ft 2 in (1.88 m)	180 lb (82 kg)	Fr	Valley View HS	Germantown, OH
F	10	Craig Sealey	6 ft 6 in (1.98 m)	217 lb (98 kg)	Sr	Brookhaven HS	Columbus, OH
G	11	Damarkeo Lyshe	5 ft 11 in (1.8 m)	160 lb (73 kg)	Jr	Westerville South HS	Westerville, OH
G	20	Jehvon Clarke	6 ft 1 in (1.85 m)	181 lb (82 kg)	Jr	Timken HS	Canton, OH
G/F	21	Chauncey Orr	6 ft 4 in (1.93 m)	201 lb (91 kg)	Jr	Bowling Green HS	Bowling Green, OH
F	22	Richaun Holmes	6 ft 8 in (2.03 m)	232 lb (105 kg)	Jr	Lockport HS; Moraine Valley CC	Lockport, IL
F	33	Garrett Mayleben	6 ft 9 in (2.06 m)	230 lb (104 kg)	Fr	Milford HS	Milford, OH
F/C	35	Cameron Black	6 ft 10 in (2.08 m)	258 lb (117 kg)	Sr	Roosevelt HS	Kent, OH

Head coach

- Louis Orr (Syracuse)

Assistant coach(es)

- LaMonta Stone (Wayne State)
- Louis Twigg (Temple)
- Dennis Hopson (Ohio State)

Legend

- (C) Team captain
- (S) Suspended
- (I) Ineligible
- (W) Walk-on
- Injured
- Current redshirt

== Schedule and results ==
Date time, TV	Opponent	Result	Record	Site (attendance) city, state
Exhibition
11/2/2013*; 2:00 pm	Malone	W 87–60		Stroh Center (N/A); Bowling Green, OH
Non-conference games
11/9/2013*; 2:00 pm	Earlham	W 102–49	1–0	Stroh Center (N/A); Bowling Green, OH
11/15/2013*; 8:30 pm, ESPN3	South Florida	L 61–75	1–1	Stroh Center (2,419); Bowling Green, OH
11/21/2013*; 8:00 pm, ESPN3	at No. 12 Wisconsin; Cancún Challenge	L 64–88	1–2	Kohl Center (16,807); Madison, WI
11/23/2013*; 7:00 pm	at Saint Louis; Cancún Challenge	L 47–74	1–3	Chaifetz Arena (6,741); St. Louis, MO
11/26/2013*; 12:30 pm	vs. Presbyterian; Cancún Challenge	W 67–45	2–3	Hard Rock Hotel Riviera Maya (220); Cancún, Mexico
11/27/2013*; 4:00 pm	vs. Oral Roberts; Cancún Challenge	L 56–63	2–4	Hard Rock Hotel Riviera Maya (934); Cancún, Mexico
12/2/2013*; 7:00 pm	WKU	W 74–62	3–4	Stroh Center (1,378); Bowling Green, OH
12/7/2013*; 2:00 pm	at Xavier	L 73–85	3–5	Cintas Center (9,270); Cincinnati, OH
12/11/2013*; 7:00 pm	North Dakota	W 79–69	4–5	Stroh Center (1,515); Bowling Green, OH
12/15/2013*; 2:00 pm	at Morehead State	W 67–61	5–5	Ellis Johnson Arena (1,507); Morehead, KY
12/22/2013*; 2:00 pm	Detroit	W 64–62	6–5	Stroh Center (1,410); Bowling Green, OH
12/29/2013*; 3:00 pm	at Wright State	L 43–46	6–6	Nutter Center (3,864); Fairborn, OH
1/2/2014*; 7:00 pm	IPFW	L 60–65	6–7	Stroh Center (1,282); Bowling Green, OH
Conference games
1/8/2014; 7:00 pm	Eastern Michigan	L 51–56	6–8 (0–1)	Stroh Center (1,205); Bowling Green, OH
1/12/2014; 4:30 pm	Northern Illinois	L 36–45	6–9 (0–2)	Stroh Center (1,982); Bowling Green, OH
1/15/2014; 7:00 pm	Central Michigan	W 67–57	7–9 (1–2)	Stroh Center (1,427); Bowling Green, OH
1/19/2014; 2:00 pm	at Western Michigan	W 69–64	8–9 (2–2)	University Arena (2,437); Kalamazoo, MI
1/22/2014; 7:00 pm	at Ohio	W 58–56	9–9 (3–2)	Convocation Center (5,801); Athens, OH
1/25/2014; 2:00 pm	Miami (OH)	L 65–70	9–10 (3–3)	Stroh Center (1,797); Bowling Green, OH
1/29/2014; 7:00 pm	at Eastern Michigan	L 57–69	9–11 (3–4)	Convocation Center (601); Ypsilanti, MI
2/2/2014; 2:00 pm	Buffalo	W 74–68	10–11 (4–4)	Stroh Center (1,456); Bowling Green, OH
2/5/2014; 7:00 pm	at Toledo	L 76–83	10–12 (4–5)	Savage Arena (6,031); Toledo, OH
2/9/2014; 2:00 pm	Akron	L 61–62	10–13 (4–6)	Stroh Center (2,901); Bowling Green, OH
2/12/2014; 7:00 pm	at Kent State	L 61–62	10–14 (4–7)	MAC Center (2,724); Kent, OH
2/15/2014; 4:00 pm	at Ball State	W 66–64	11–14 (5–7)	John E. Worthen Arena (3,414); Muncie, IN
2/20/2014; 7:00 pm	Toledo	L 58–60	11–15 (5–8)	Stroh Center (3,182); Bowling Green, OH
2/23/2014; 2:00 pm	at Miami (OH)	L 52–55	11–16 (5–9)	Millett Hall (945); Oxford, OH
2/26/2014; 7:00 pm	Kent State	W 73–66	12–16 (6–9)	Stroh Center (1,333); Bowling Green, OH
3/1/2014; 7:00 pm	at Akron	L 47–57	12–17 (6–10)	James A. Rhodes Arena (4,049); Akron, OH
3/4/2014; 7:00 pm	Ohio	L 61–72	12–18 (6–11)	Stroh Center (1,798); Bowling Green, OH
3/8/2014; 2:30 pm	at Buffalo	L 65–88	12–19 (6–12)	Alumni Arena (5,452); Amherst, NY
MAC tournament
03/10/2014; 8:00 pm	vs. Northern Illinois; First round	L 51–54	12–20	Convocation Center (941); DeKalb, IL
*Non-conference game. ^{#}Rankings from AP Poll. (#) Tournament seedings in parentheses. All times are in Eastern.
