= 2013–14 Northern Illinois Huskies men's basketball team =

American college basketball season

2013–14 Northern Illinois Huskies men's basketball
- Conference: Mid-American Conference
- West Division
- Record: 15–17 (8–10 MAC)
- Head coach: Mark Montgomery (3rd season)
- Assistant coaches: Jon Borovich; Lou Dawkins; Jason Larson
- Home arena: Convocation Center

2013–14 Mid-American Conference men's basketball standings
	Conf.				Overall
Team	W		L	PCT	W		L	PCT
East
Buffalo	13	–	5	.722	19	–	10	.655
Akron	12	–	6	.667	21	–	13	.618
Ohio	11	–	7	.611	25	–	12	.676
Miami	8	–	10	.444	13	–	18	.419
Kent State	7	–	11	.389	16	–	16	.500
Bowling Green	6	–	12	.333	12	–	20	.375
West
Toledo	14	–	4	.778	27	–	7	.794
Western Michigan †	14	–	4	.778	23	–	10	.697
Eastern Michigan	10	–	8	.556	22	–	15	.595
Northern Illinois	8	–	10	.444	15	–	17	.469
Central Michigan	3	–	15	.167	10	–	21	.323
Ball State	2	–	16	.111	5	–	25	.167
† 2014 MAC tournament winner

The 2013–14 Northern Illinois Huskies men's basketball team represented Northern Illinois University during the 2013–14 NCAA Division I men's basketball season. The Huskies, led by third year head coach Mark Montgomery, played their home games at the Convocation Center as members of the West Division of the Mid-American Conference. They finished the season 15–17, 8–10 in MAC play to finish in fourth place in the West Division. They advanced to the second round of the MAC tournament where they lost to Eastern Michigan.

== Season ==
=== Preseason ===
The Huskies announced their complete season schedule on September 3, 2013. Highlighted by an early November tournament at home featuring San Jose State, James Madison, and Milwaukee, the Huskies schedule included 16 home games. The Huskies also scheduled to make trips to Nebraska, UMass, and Iowa State. For the conference schedule, the Huskies schedule home-and-home series with Ball State, Central Michigan, Eastern Michigan, Toledo, Western Michigan, Buffalo, and Kent State, while hosting Ohio and Miami and visiting Akron and Bowling Green.

== Roster ==
2013–14 Northern Illinois Huskies men's basketball team
Players
Coaches

Pos.	#	Name	Height	Weight	Year	Previous school	Hometown
C	0	Pete Rakocevic	6 ft 11 in (2.11 m)	245 lb (111 kg)	RS Jr	Wilbraham & Monson Academy; Sacramento State	Chicago, IL
G	2	Aaron Armstead	6 ft 4 in (1.93 m)	195 lb (88 kg)	Jr	Hales Franciscan HS; San Jose City College	Chicago, IL
G	3	Antone Christian	6 ft 2 in (1.88 m)	205 lb (93 kg)	RS Sr	Martin Luther King HS	Nashville, TN
G	4	Dontel Highsmith	6 ft 2 in (1.88 m)	190 lb (86 kg)	Fr	Dowagiac HS	Dowagiac, MI
G	5	Travon Baker	5 ft 10 in (1.78 m)	160 lb (73 kg)	So	Detroit Consortium	Detroit, MI
F	10	Darrell Bowie	6 ft 6 in (1.98 m)	220 lb (100 kg)	So	La Jolla Prep	Milwaukee, WI
G	11	Daveon Balls	6 ft 0 in (1.83 m)	170 lb (77 kg)	So	Lawrence North HS	Indianapolis, IN
F	13	Kevin Gray	6 ft 8 in (2.03 m)	225 lb (102 kg)	Jr	Brooks Academy	Chicago, IL
G	15	J. J. Cravatta	6 ft 1 in (1.85 m)	185 lb (84 kg)	So	Streator Township HS	Streator, IL
F	21	Keith Gray	6 ft 8 in (2.03 m)	225 lb (102 kg)	Jr	Brooks Academy	Chicago, IL
G	23	Aaric Armstead	6 ft 5 in (1.96 m)	190 lb (86 kg)	Fr	La Jolla Prep	Chicago, IL
G/F	32	Aksel Bolin	6 ft 7 in (2.01 m)	220 lb (100 kg)	Sr	Asker HS	Asker, Norway
G	33	Anthony Johnson	6 ft 3 in (1.91 m)	190 lb (86 kg)	Jr	Whitney Young HS; Purdue	Chicago, IL
C	34	Marin Maric	6 ft 10 in (2.08 m)	240 lb (109 kg)	Fr	La Lumiere School	Split, Croatia
C	42	Jordan Threloff	6 ft 9 in (2.06 m)	255 lb (116 kg)	RS Jr	DeKalb HS; Illinois State	DeKalb, IL
G	55	Michael Orris	6 ft 2 in (1.88 m)	195 lb (88 kg)	So	Crete-Monee HS; Kansas State	Crete, IL

Head coach

- Mark Montgomery (Michigan State)

Assistant coach(es)

- Jon Borovich (Central Michigan)
- Lou Dawkins (Tulsa)
- Jason Larson (Grand Valley State)

Legend

- (C) Team captain
- (S) Suspended
- (I) Ineligible
- (W) Walk-on
- Injured
- Current redshirt

== Departures ==
Name	Number	Pos.	Height	Weight	Year	Hometown	Notes
Abdel Nader	23	F	6'7"	225	Junior	Skokie, IL	Transferred
Akeem Springs	2	G	6'3"	208	Sophomore	Waukegan, IL	Transferred
Brandon Hayes	4	F	6'4"	200	Graduate	Homewood, IL	Graduated
Mike Davis	24	G	6'2"	200	Sophomore	Cleveland, OH	Transferred
Tony Nixon	25	G	6'4"	207	Graduate	Chicago, IL	Graduated
Sam Mader	2	G	6'9"	220	Sophomore	Appelton, WI	Transferred

== Recruits ==
College recruiting information
Name	Hometown	School	Height	Weight	Commit date
Dontel Highsmith; PG	Dowagiac, MI	Dowagiac Union High School	6 ft 2 in (1.88 m)	175 lb (79 kg)	
Dontel Highsmith; PG	Recruit ratings: Scout: Rivals: (68)				
Aaric Armstead; SF	Chicago, IL	La Jolla Prep	6 ft 5 in (1.96 m)	185 lb (84 kg)	
Aaric Armstead; SF	Recruit ratings: Scout: Rivals: (65)				
Marin Maric; C	Split, CR	La Lumiere School (Ind.)	6 ft 10 in (2.08 m)	240 lb (110 kg)	
Marin Maric; C	Recruit ratings: No ratings found				
Overall recruit ranking: Scout: Not Ranked Rivals: Not Ranked ESPN: Not Ranked
Note: In many cases, Scout, Rivals, 247Sports, On3, and ESPN may conflict in their listings of height and weight.; In these cases, the average was taken. ESPN grades are on a 100-point scale.; Sources: "2013 Team Ranking". Rivals.

NIU also got Aaron Armstead, transfer from San Jose City College. Redshirted last year, Pete Rakocevic is also eligible this year.

== Schedule and results ==
Date time, TV	Opponent	Result	Record	Site (attendance) city, state
Exhibition
11/2/2013*; 5:00 pm	Rockford	W 90–57		Convocation Center (701); DeKalb, IL
Non-conference games
11/8/2013*; 7:00 pm	Nebraska–Omaha	L 66–68	0–1	Convocation Center (1,060); DeKalb, IL
11/15/2013*; 8:00 pm	James Madison; NIU Invitational	L 55–60	0–2	Convocation Center (1,113); DeKalb, IL
11/16/2013*; 8:00 pm	San Jose State; NIU Invitational	W 60–59	1–2	Convocation Center (753); DeKalb, IL
11/17/2013*; 3:30 pm	Milwaukee; NIU Invitational	L 69–82	1–3	Convocation Center (474); DeKalb, IL
11/24/2013*; 3:00 pm	Saint Joseph's (IN)	W 111–61	2–3	Convocation Center (663); DeKalb, IL
11/30/2013*; 12:00 pm	at Nebraska	L 58–63	2–4	Pinnacle Bank Arena (15,332); Lincoln, NE
12/5/2013*; 7:00 pm	Dartmouth	W 64–57	3–4	Convocation Center (625); DeKalb, IL
12/14/2013*; 2:00 pm, NBCSN	at No. 21 Massachusetts	L 54–80	3–5	William D. Mullins Memorial Center (4694); Amherst, MA
12/18/2013*; 7:00 pm	at Loyola (IL)	W 55–49	4–5	Joseph J. Gentile Arena (1517); Chicago, IL
12/22/2013*; 4:00 pm	at UC Riverside	W 71–64	5–5	UC Riverside Student Recreation Center (236); Riverside, CA
12/31/2013*; 6:00 pm	at No. 14 Iowa State	L 63–99	5–6	Hilton Coliseum (14,384); Ames, IA
1/3/2014*; 7:00 pm	Bethune-Cookman	W 65–51	6–6	Convocation Center (657); DeKalb, IL
Conference games
1/8/2014; 6:00 pm	at Buffalo	L 46–67	6–7 (0–1)	Alumni Arena (1,520); Amherst, NY
1/12/2014; 3:30 pm	at Bowling Green	W 45–36	7–7 (1–1)	Stroh Center (1,982); Bowling Green, OH
1/15/2014; 7:00 pm	Kent State	L 64–73	7–8 (1–2)	Convocation Center (651); DeKalb, IL
1/18/2014; 7:00 pm	Ohio	L 46–65	7–9 (1–3)	Convocation Center (1,667); DeKalb, IL
1/22/2014; 6:00 pm	at Toledo	L 68–77	7–10 (1–4)	Savage Arena (4,335); Toledo, OH
1/25/2014; 1:00 pm	Buffalo	L 67–75	7–11 (1–5)	Convocation Center (901); DeKalb, IL
1/29/2014; 6:00 pm, ESPN 3	at Kent State	W 50–49	8–11 (2–5)	MAC Center (2,234); Kent, OH
2/1/2014; 1:00 pm	at Ball State	W 67–65 ^{OT}	9–11 (3–5)	John E. Worthen Arena (2,786); Muncie, IN
2/4/2014; 7:00 pm, ESPN 3	Miami (OH)	W 53–41	10–11 (4–5)	Convocation Center (644); DeKalb, IL
2/9/2014; 3:30 pm	Western Michigan	L 71–74	10–12 (4–6)	Convocation Center (2,005); DeKalb, IL
2/12/2014; 7:00 pm	Central Michigan	W 88–63	11–12 (5–6)	Convocation Center (773); DeKalb, IL
2/15/2014; 6:00 pm	at Akron	L 54–62	11–13 (5–7)	James A. Rhodes Arena (3,642); Akron, OH
2/20/2014; 7:00 pm, ESPN 3	Eastern Michigan	W 61–59	12–13 (6–7)	Convocation Center (877); DeKalb, IL
2/23/2014; 1:00 pm	at Central Michigan	L 67–70	12–14 (6–8)	McGuirk Arena (1,797); Mount Pleasant, MI
2/26/2014; 7:00 pm	Toledo	W 74–66	13–14 (7–8)	Convocation Center (1,254); DeKalb, IL
3/1/2014; 1:00 pm	at Eastern Michigan	W 56–52	13–15 (7–9)	Convocation Center (815); Ypsilanti, MI
3/4/2014; 6:00 pm	at Western Michigan	L 56–61	13–16 (7–10)	University Arena (3,176); Kalamazoo, MI
3/8/2014; 3:30 pm	Ball State	W 70–56	14–16 (8–10)	Convocation Center (2,144); DeKalb, IL
MAC tournament
03/10/2014; 7:00 pm	vs. Bowling Green; First round	W 54–51	15–16	Convocation Center (941); DeKalb, IL
03/12/2014; 9:00 pm	vs. Eastern Michigan; Second round	L 48–53	15–17	Quicken Loans Arena (1,513); Cleveland, OH
*Non-conference game. ^{#}Rankings from AP Poll. (#) Tournament seedings in parentheses. All times are in Central.
