= Steve Hawkins =

American basketball coach

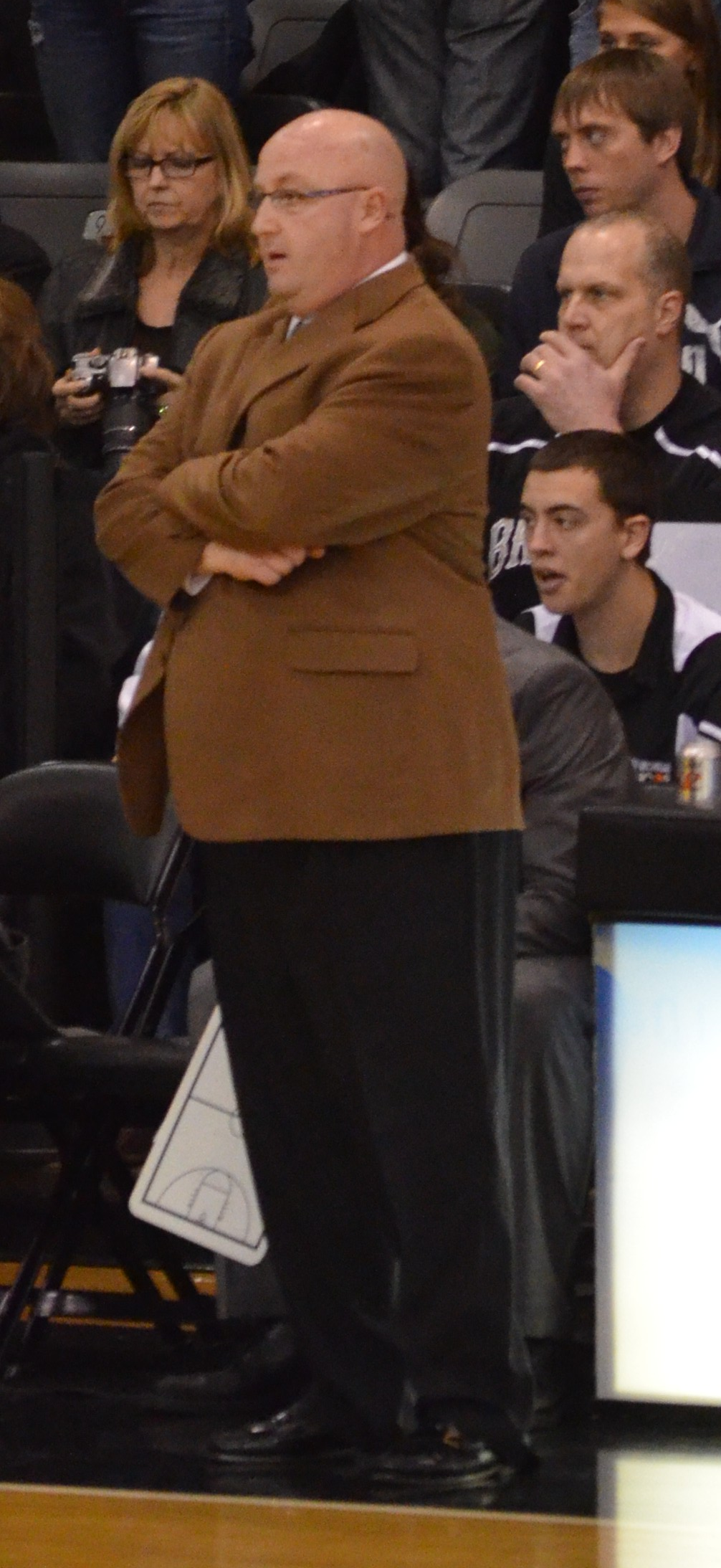
- Hawkins in a 2011 game against Oakland University

Current position
- Title: Assistant coach
- Team: Southern Illinois
- Conference: MVC

Biographical details
- Born: August 3, 1962 (age 64); Ventura, California, U.S.
- Education: South Alabama (1987) (BA); United States Sports Academy 1989 (MA)

Coaching career (HC unless noted)
- 1981–1983: Villanova Prep. School
- 1983–1984: St. Bonaventure HS
- 1984–1987: South Alabama (asst.)
- 1987–1988: Quincy (asst.)
- 1988–1990: St. Andrew's (asst.)
- 1990–1991: Quincy (asst.)
- 1991–2000: Quincy
- 2000–2003: Western Michigan (asst.)
- 2003–2020: Western Michigan
- 2022–2024: Quincy
- 2024–present: Southern Illinois (asst.)

Head coaching record
- Overall: 453–405 (.528)

Accomplishments and honors

Championships
- 2× MAC tournament (2004, 2014); 2x MAC regular season (2004, 2014); 8× MAC West Division (2004, 2005, 2008, 2009, 2011, 2013, 2014, 2017)

Awards
- MAC Coach of the Year (2014)

Stephen Greg Hawkins (born August 3, 1962) is an American college basketball coach. He is currently an assistant men's basketball coach for Southern Illinois University Carbondale, a position he has held since 2024. He had previously served as the head coach at Western Michigan University and Quincy University.

== Coaching career ==
=== Early career ===
Hawkins was born in Ventura, California. Following his graduation from high school, Hawkins spent time as a high school basketball coach in the Los Angeles area at Villanova Preparatory School and St. Bonaventure High School during the early 1980s. During this time he worked as an assistant at UCLA basketball camps, serving as chauffeur for legendary Bruins coach John Wooden. While the two were stuck in traffic, they were able to talk basketball. Hawkins maintained the UCLA connection during his coaching career, often having Wooden speak to his teams at Quincy and Western Michigan. Former UCLA head coach Larry Farmer, would later work for Hawkins as an assistant coach at Western Michigan from 2010–12 and again from 2013 until the present.

Hawkins later attended the University of South Alabama, graduating with a bachelor's degree in 1987. From 1984–87 he served as a student assistant to men's basketball head coach Mike Hanks. In 1989 he earned his master's degree in sports science from the United States Sports Academy.

Hawkins served as an assistant coach at Quincy University from 1987-1988 and 1990-1991 and St. Andrews Presbyterian College in 1989. He was promoted to head coach at Quincy in 1992 and served there for 9 seasons until joining the staff of Robert McCullum at Western Michigan in the spring of 2000.

=== Western Michigan University ===
Hawkins was named head coach at Western Michigan University on May 1, 2003, following the departure of head coach Robert McCullum to South Florida. Hawkins had served as an assistant coach on the WMU staff for the previous three seasons.

Under Hawkins, the Broncos have finished no worse than 3rd in the Mid-American Conference West Division. The team captured both the MAC regular season championship and conference tournament championship in 2003–04. That squad eventually fell to Vanderbilt in the opening round of the 2004 NCAA Men's Division I Basketball Tournament.

Following the 2004–05 season, the Broncos participated in the 2005 National Invitation Tournament.

In 2005 Hawkins was a finalist for the head coaching job at DePaul University that eventually went to Jerry Wainwright. He has also received head coaching offers from the University of San Francisco (2004), the University of Nevada, and Southern Methodist University. He also received interest from Bradley University and Loyola-Chicago.

In July 2007, Hawkins was hospitalised for three days following a seizure in his office.

Following the 2007–08 basketball season, Hawkins was very critical of the post season basketball tournaments. Despite a 20-win season and a MAC West Division title, WMU was passed over for post season play, including the new College Basketball Invitational.

Following the 2010–11 basketball season, Hawkins coached the Broncos in the 2011 CollegeInsider.com Tournament. After a victory in the opening round against Tennessee Tech, the Broncos fell in the second round to MAC rival Buffalo.

Following the 2012-13 basketballs season, Hawkins and Broncos participated in the 2013 College Basketball Invitational. They won their first 2 games before falling to George Mason in the semifinals.

The 2013-14 Broncos were one of the most successful of Hawkins' tenure, with a Rainbow Classic Championship, a MAC regular season championship, and a MAC tournament championship. The team made the NCAA tournament, where as a #14 seed they fell in the opening round to #3 seed Syracuse by a score of 77-53. Following the season, Hawkins was named the 2014 MAC Men's Basketball Coach of the Year.

On Wednesday, March 11, 2020, Western Michigan announced Hawkins would not return, ending his 17-year run as head coach.

=== Quincy University (second stint) ===
On March 9, 2022, Hawkins was hired as head coach of the Quincy Hawks men's basketball team. On April 15, 2024, Hawkins resigned as head coach to explore another opportunity.

=== Southern Illinois University ===
On April 15, 2024, Hawkins was hired as an assistant coach of the Southern Illinois Salukis men's basketball team under head coach Scott Nagy.

== Head coaching record ==
Record table
Season	Team	Overall	Conference	Standing	Postseason
Quincy Hawks (Great Lakes Valley Conference) (1991–2000)
1991–92	Quincy	8–20			
1992–93	Quincy	16–11			
1993–94	Quincy	19–9			NCAA DII first round
1994–95	Quincy	23–7			NCAA DII Semifinals
1995–96	Quincy	17–10			
1996–97	Quincy	20–9			NCAA DII Regional semifinals
1997–98	Quincy	12–14			
1998–99	Quincy	12–15			
1999–00	Quincy	10–16			
Western Michigan Broncos (Mid-American Conference) (2003–2020)
2003–04	Western Michigan	26–5	15–3	1st (West)	NCAA Division I Round of 64
2004–05	Western Michigan	20–13	11–7	T–1st (West)	NIT 2nd Round
2005–06	Western Michigan	14–17	10–8	T–2nd (West)	
2006–07	Western Michigan	16–16	9–7	2nd (West)	
2007–08	Western Michigan	20–12	12–4	1st (West)	
2008–09	Western Michigan	10–21	7–9	T–1st (West)	
2009–10	Western Michigan	18–15	8–8	T–2nd (West)	
2010–11	Western Michigan	21–13	11–5	1st (West)	CIT 2nd Round
2011–12	Western Michigan	14–20	6–10	T–3rd (West)	
2012–13	Western Michigan	22–13	10–6	1st (West)	CBI semifinals
2013–14	Western Michigan	23–10	14–4	T–1st (West)	NCAA Division I Round of 64
2014–15	Western Michigan	20–14	10–8	3rd (West)	CIT 1st Round
2015–16	Western Michigan	13–19	7–11	6th (West)	
2016–17	Western Michigan	16–16	11–7	T–1st (West)	
2017–18	Western Michigan	17–15	9–9	4th (West)	
2018–19	Western Michigan	8–24	2–16	6th (West)	
2019–20	Western Michigan	13–19	6–12	T–5th (West)	
Western Michigan:		291–262 (.526)	158–134 (.541)		
Quincy Hawks (Great Lakes Valley Conference) (2022–2024)
2022–23	Quincy	14–15	10–10	T–8th	
2023–24	Quincy	11–17	6–14	13th	
Quincy:		162–143 (.531)	16–24 (.400)		
Total:		453–405 (.528)			
National champion Postseason invitational champion Conference regular season champion Conference regular season and conference tournament champion Division regular season champion Division regular season and conference tournament champion Conference tournament champion
