= 2013–14 Ball State Cardinals men's basketball team =

American college basketball season

2013–14 Ball State Cardinals men's basketball
- Conference: Mid-American Conference
- West Division
- Record: 5–25 (2–16 MAC)
- Head coach: James Whitford (1st season)
- Assistant coaches: Brett Nelson; Billy Wright; Jason Grunkemeyer
- Home arena: John E. Worthen Arena

2013–14 Mid-American Conference men's basketball standings
	Conf.				Overall
Team	W		L	PCT	W		L	PCT
East
Buffalo	13	–	5	.722	19	–	10	.655
Akron	12	–	6	.667	21	–	13	.618
Ohio	11	–	7	.611	25	–	12	.676
Miami	8	–	10	.444	13	–	18	.419
Kent State	7	–	11	.389	16	–	16	.500
Bowling Green	6	–	12	.333	12	–	20	.375
West
Toledo	14	–	4	.778	27	–	7	.794
Western Michigan †	14	–	4	.778	23	–	10	.697
Eastern Michigan	10	–	8	.556	22	–	15	.595
Northern Illinois	8	–	10	.444	15	–	17	.469
Central Michigan	3	–	15	.167	10	–	21	.323
Ball State	2	–	16	.111	5	–	25	.167
† 2014 MAC tournament winner

The 2013–14 Ball State Cardinals men's basketball team represented Ball State University during the 2013–14 NCAA Division I men's basketball season. The Cardinals, led by first year head coach James Whitford, played their home games at the John E. Worthen Arena as members of the West Division of the Mid-American Conference. They finished the season 5–25, 2–16 in MAC play to finish in last place in the West Division. They lost in the first round of the MAC tournament to Ohio.

== Season ==
=== Preseason ===
On April 10, 2013, Ball State announced James Whitford as the 19th head coach in program history. Whitford had previously worked under Sean Miller as an assistant coach at Xavier and Arizona. On April 19, Whitford announced the first hiring of an assistant coach by hiring Brett Nelson. Nelson, a former honorable mention All-American at Florida, had previous assistant coaching experience at Marshall, Arkansas, and Drake. Jason Grunkemeyer was hired as the second assistant coach to Whitford's staff on April 26. Grunkemeyer, a former player at conference foe Miami, joined the staff after several years as an assistant at Saint Louis. On May 3, Whitford filled out his staff by hiring Billy Wright as his final assistant coach. Wright was previously the associate head coach at Western Illinois.

Whitford announced the team's conference schedule on September 3, 2013. Ball State schedule home-and-home series with Central Michigan, Eastern Michigan, Northern Illinois, Toledo, Western Michigan, Akron, and Buffalo, while hosting Miami and Bowling Green and visiting Kent State and Ohio. The non-conference schedule was released on September 24, 2013. Road trips to Utah and Marquette, along with hosting Butler highlighted the non-league slate.

=== November ===
The Cardinals traveled to Terre Haute, Indiana on November 9 to open their season against the Indiana State Sycamores. Despite a solid game from Zavier Turner (17 points), the Cardinals fell in James Whitford's debut, 73–82.

== Roster ==
2013–14 Ball State Cardinals men's basketball team
Players
Coaches

Pos.	#	Name	Height	Weight	Year	Previous school	Hometown
G	0	Kameran Madison (W)	5 ft 9 in (1.75 m)	185 lb (84 kg)	Jr	Bowman Academy; Purdue Calumet	Gary, IN
G	1	Zavier Turner	5 ft 9 in (1.75 m)	170 lb (77 kg)	Fr	Pike HS	Indianapolis, IN
F	2	Matt Kamieniecki	6 ft 8 in (2.03 m)	238 lb (108 kg)	Sr	Clarkston HS	Clarkston, MI
G	3	Quinten Payne	6 ft 5 in (1.96 m)	190 lb (86 kg)	Fr	St. Charles North HS	St. Charles, IL
G	4	Kindon "KD" Crowder (W)	6 ft 3 in (1.91 m)	180 lb (82 kg)	Sr	Munster HS	Chicago, IL
F	5	Rocco Belcaster	6 ft 7 in (2.01 m)	201 lb (91 kg)	So	Morton HS	Berwyn, IL
G	11	Kaleb Mallory (W)	5 ft 8 in (1.73 m)	140 lb (64 kg)	Fr	Muncie Central HS	Muncie, IN
F	12	Bo Calhoun	6 ft 5 in (1.96 m)	228 lb (103 kg)	So	Washington HS	South Bend, IN
G	13	Mark Alstork	6 ft 4 in (1.93 m)	190 lb (86 kg)	Fr	Thurgood Marshall HS	Dayton, OH
G	14	Chase Brogna	5 ft 11 in (1.8 m)	181 lb (82 kg)	So	St. Thomas HS	Houston, TX
F	15	Franko House	6 ft 6 in (1.98 m)	245 lb (111 kg)	Fr	Concord HS	Elkhart, IN
F	20	Chris Bond	6 ft 4 in (1.93 m)	195 lb (88 kg)	Sr	Bowman Academy	Gary, IN
G	32	Jesse Berry	6 ft 2 in (1.88 m)	192 lb (87 kg)	Sr	Jefferson HS	Lafayette, IN
F	34	Tyler Koch	6 ft 6 in (1.98 m)	229 lb (104 kg)	Sr	Winchester HS; Wright State	Winchester, IN
C	44	Mading Thok	6 ft 11 in (2.11 m)	200 lb (91 kg)	RS Fr	Western Christian HS	Boyden, IA
F	55	Majok Majok	6 ft 9 in (2.06 m)	245 lb (111 kg)	Sr	Northfield Mount Hermon School; Midland College	Perth, Australia

Head coach

- James Whitford (Wisconsin)

Assistant coach(es)

- Brett Nelson (Florida)
- Jason Grunkemeyer (Bradley)
- Billy Wright (Miami (OH))

Legend

- (C) Team captain
- (S) Suspended
- (I) Ineligible
- (W) Walk-on
- Injured
- Current redshirt

== Schedule and results ==
Date time, TV	Opponent	Result	Record	Site (attendance) city, state
Exhibition
11/4/2013*; 7:00 pm	Marian	W 62–59	0–0	John E. Worthen Arena (1,584); Muncie, IN
Non-conference games
11/9/2013*; 1:05 pm	at Indiana State	L 73–82	0–1	Hulman Center (7,221); Terre Haute, IN
11/12/2013*; 7:00 pm	Taylor	W 73–53	1–1	John E. Worthen Arena (2,922); Muncie, IN
11/18/2013*; 7:00 pm	SE Missouri State	W 87–83	2–1	John E. Worthen Arena (2,765); Muncie, IN
11/23/2013*; 2:00 pm	Butler	L 58–59	2–2	John E. Worthen Arena (6,015); Muncie, IN
11/27/2013*; 9:00 pm, P12N	at Utah	L 69–88	2–3	Jon M. Huntsman Center (8,761); Salt Lake City, UT
11/30/2013*; 7:00 pm	at Cleveland State	L 55–78	2–4	Wolstein Center (1,991); Cleveland, OH
12/4/2013*; 7:00 pm, Sports Link	Valparaiso	L 50–69	2–5	John E. Worthen Arena (2,953); Muncie, IN
12/17/2013*; 8:00 pm, FS1	at Marquette	L 53–91	2–6	BMO Harris Bradley Center (13,668); Milwaukee, WI
12/21/2013*; 8:00 pm	at Southern Illinois	L 58–66	2–7	SIU Arena (4,223); Carbondale, IL
12/30/2013*; 8:00 pm	at James Madison	L 68–73	2–8	JMU Convocation Center (3,172); Harrisonburg, VA
1/3/2014*; 7:00 pm	Oakland City	W 94–58	3–8	John E. Worthen Arena (2,487); Muncie, IN
Conference games
1/8/2014; 7:00 pm	Akron	L 68–72	3–9 (0–1)	John E. Worthen Arena (2,606); Muncie, IN
1/11/2014; 7:00 pm	at Kent State	L 74–86	3–10 (0–2)	MAC Center (3,764); Kent, OH
1/15/2014; 8:00 pm, TWCS	at Ohio	L 51–71	3–11 (0–3)	Convocation Center (5,942); Athens, OH
1/18/2014; 2:00 pm, Ball State Sports Net	Miami (OH)	L 52–64	3–12 (0–4)	John E. Worthen Arena (3,054); Muncie, IN
1/23/2014; 8:00 pm, TWCS	Buffalo	W 71–68	4–12 (1–4)	John E. Worthen Arena (3,072); Muncie, IN
1/26/2014; 2:00 pm, Ball State Sports Net	at Western Michigan	L 53–62	4–13 (1–5)	University Arena (2,698); Kalamazoo, MI
1/29/2014; 7:00 pm	at Akron	L 46–73	4–14 (1–6)	James A. Rhodes Arena (3,211); Akron, OH
2/1/2014; 2:00 pm	Northern Illinois	L 65–67 ^{OT}	4–15 (1–7)	John E. Worthen Arena (2,786); Muncie, IN
2/5/2014; 7:00 pm	at Buffalo	L 48–69	4–16 (1–8)	Alumni Arena (2,558); Amherst, NY
2/8/2014; 2:00 pm	Toledo	L 73–80	4–17 (1–9)	John E. Worthen Arena (2,722); Muncie, IN
2/12/2014; 7:00 pm	Eastern Michigan	L 62–73	4–18 (1–10)	John E. Worthen Arena (2,411); Muncie, IN
2/15/2014; 4:00 pm, Sports Link	Bowling Green	L 64–66	4–19 (1–11)	John E. Worthen Arena (3,414); Muncie, IN
2/19/2014; 7:00 pm, Ball State Sports Net	at Central Michigan	L 95–101 ^{3OT}	4–20 (1–12)	McGuirk Arena (1,673); Mount Pleasant, MI
2/23/2014; 6:00 pm, TWCS	at Toledo	L 74–85	4–21 (1–13)	Savage Arena (4,912); Toledo, OH
2/26/2014; 7:00 pm, TWCS	Western Michigan	L 81–88 ^{OT}	4–22 (1–14)	John E. Worthen Arena (2,590); Muncie, IN
3/1/2014; 2:00 pm	Central Michigan	W 74–71	5–22 (2–14)	John E. Worthen Arena (3,125); Muncie, IN
3/4/2014; 7:00 pm, Ball State Sports Net	at Eastern Michigan	L 58–72	5–23 (2–15)	Convocation Center (903); Ypsilanti, MI
3/8/2014; 4:30 pm	at Northern Illinois	L 56–70	5–24 (2–16)	Convocation Center (2,144); DeKalb, IL
2014 MAC tournament
3/10/2014; 7:00 pm	at Ohio; First round	L 64–76	5–25	Convocation Center (4,153); Athens, OH
*Non-conference game. ^{#}Rankings from AP Poll. (#) Tournament seedings in parentheses. All times are in Eastern.
