= Will Felder =

American professional basketball player

Tours
- Position: Power forward
- League: Nationale Masculine 1

Personal information
- Born: March 9, 1991 (age 35) Cleveland, Ohio, U.S.
- Listed height: 6 ft 7 in (2.01 m)
- Listed weight: 202 lb (92 kg)

Career information
- High school: Lutheran East (Cleveland Heights, Ohio)
- College: Saint Francis (PA) (2009–2011); Miami (Ohio) (2012–2014)
- NBA draft: 2014: undrafted
- Playing career: 2014–present

Career history
- 2014–2015: ZZ Leiden
- 2015–2016: Vendée Challans
- 2016–2017: Rueil Athletic Club
- 2017–2019: UB Chartres Métropole
- 2019–present: Union Tours Métropole

Career highlights
- DBL All-Star (2015); DBL blocks leader (2015); NEC All-Rookie Team (2010)

Will Felder (born March 9, 1991) is an American professional basketball player. Felder usually plays as power forward and is known for his athletic playing style.

== College career ==
Felder played four seasons collegiate, two for Saint Francis (PA) and two for the Miami RedHawks.

== Professional career ==
For the 2014–15 season, Felder signed with Dutch side ZZ Leiden of the Dutch Basketball League (DBL). In his debut DBL season, Felder averaged 10 points and 4.8 rebounds per game over 31 games. Felder also led the league in blocks, as he averaged 1.2 blocks per game.
