= 2014 National Invitation Tournament =

Annual NCAA basketball competition

- Season: 2013–14
- Teams: 32
- Finals site: Madison Square Garden, New York City
- Champions: Minnesota Golden Gophers (3rd title)
- Runner-up: SMU Mustangs (1st title game)
- Semifinalists: Clemson Tigers (3rd semifinal); Florida State Seminoles (2nd semifinal)
- Winning coach: Richard Pitino (1st title)
- MVP: Austin Hollins (Minnesota)

The 2014 National Invitation Tournament was a single-elimination tournament of 32 NCAA Division I teams that were not selected to participate in the 2014 NCAA tournament. The annual tournament started on campus sites for the first three rounds, with the Final 4 and championship game being held at Madison Square Garden in New York City. The tournament began on Tuesday, March 18 and ended on Thursday, April 3. Minnesota won this tournament after being the third Big Ten team in a row to make the NIT Finals (the two previous years a Big Ten team had lost the final game).

== Participants ==
=== Automatic qualifiers ===
The following teams earned automatic berths into the 2014 NIT field having won their respective conference's regular season championship, but failing to win their conference tournament.

Team	Conference	Record	Appearance	Last bid
Belmont	Ohio Valley	24–9	2nd	2004
Boston University	Patriot	24–10	6th	2005
Davidson	Southern	20–12	6th	2009
Florida Gulf Coast	Atlantic Sun	22–12	1st	Never
Georgia State	Sun Belt	25–8	2nd	2002
Green Bay	Horizon	24–6	3rd	1992
High Point	Big South	16–14	1st	Never
Iona	MAAC	22–10	5th	1997
Louisiana Tech	C-USA	27–7	8th	2013
Robert Morris	Northeast	21–13	3rd	2013
UC Irvine	Big West	23–11	5th	2002
Utah Valley	WAC	20–11	1st	Never
Vermont	America East	22–10	3rd	2011

Southern from the Southwestern Athletic Conference (SWAC) was the league regular-season champion and lost in their conference tournament but is ineligible for the NIT due to Academic Progress Rate (APR) sanctions. No team from the SWAC received an NIT autobid.

Arizona (Pac-12), Cincinnati (American), Kansas (Big 12), Michigan (Big Ten), Saint Louis (Atlantic 10), San Diego State (Mountain West) and Villanova (Big East) received automatic bids to the NIT, but did not accept them as they were selected as at-large teams in the 2014 NCAA tournament.

=== At-large bids ===
The following 19 teams were also awarded NIT berths.

Team	Conference	Record	Appearance	Last bid
Arkansas	SEC	21–11	3rd	1997
California	Pac-12	19–13	8th	2011
Clemson	ACC	20–12	15th	2007
Florida State	ACC	19–13	9th	2013
Georgetown	Big East	17–14	12th	2009
Georgia	SEC	19–13	12th	2007
Illinois	Big Ten	19–14	5th	2010
Indiana State	Missouri Valley	23–10	4th	2013
LSU	SEC	19–13	7th	2012
Minnesota	Big Ten	20–13	15th	2012
Missouri	SEC	22–11	8th	2005
Saint Mary's	West Coast	22–11	3rd	2011
San Francisco	West Coast	21–11	6th	2005
SMU	American	23–9	3rd	2000
Southern Miss	C-USA	27–6	10th	2013
St. John's	Big East	20–12	30th	2013
Toledo	MAC	27–6	8th	2007
Utah	Pac-12	21–11	16th	2001
West Virginia	Big 12	17–15	16th	2007

=== Seeds ===
SMU Bracket
Seed	School	Conference	Record	Berth type
1	SMU	American	23–9	At-large
2	California	Pac-12	19–13	At-large
3	Arkansas	SEC	21–11	At-large
4	San Francisco	West Coast	21–11	At-large
5	LSU	SEC	19–13	At-large
6	Indiana State	MVC	23–10	At-large
7	Utah Valley	WAC	20–11	Automatic
8	UC Irvine	Big West	23–11	Automatic

Florida State Bracket
Seed	School	Conference	Record	Berth type
1	Florida State	ACC	19–13	At-large
2	Georgia	SEC	19–13	At-large
3	Louisiana Tech	C-USA	27–7	Automatic
4	Georgetown	Big East	17–14	At-large
5	West Virginia	Big 12	17–15	At-large
6	Iona	MAAC	22–10	Automatic
7	Vermont	America East	22–10	Automatic
8	Florida Gulf Coast	Atlantic Sun	22–12	Automatic

St. John's Bracket
Seed	School	Conference	Record	Berth type
1	St. John's	Big East	20–12	At-large
2	Illinois	Big Ten	19–14	At-large
3	Clemson	ACC	20–12	At-large
4	Green Bay	Horizon	24–6	Automatic
5	Belmont	Ohio Valley	24–9	Automatic
6	Georgia State	Sun Belt	25–8	Automatic
7	Boston University	Patriot	24–10	Automatic
8	Robert Morris	Northeast	21–13	Automatic

Minnesota Bracket
Seed	School	Conference	Record	Berth type
1	Minnesota	Big Ten	20–13	At-large
2	Missouri	SEC	22–11	At-large
3	Southern Miss	C-USA	27–6	At-large
4	Saint Mary's	West Coast	22–11	At-large
5	Utah	Pac-12	21–11	At-large
6	Toledo	MAC	27–6	At-large
7	Davidson	Southern	20–12	Automatic
8	High Point	Big South	16–14	Automatic

== Bracket ==
Games are played at higher seed unless noted.

First round March 18–19
1	SMU	68
8	UC Irvine	54
4	San Francisco	63
5	LSU	71
2	California	77
7	Utah Valley	64
3	Arkansas	91
6	Indiana State	71

Second round March 24
1	SMU	80
5	LSU	67
2	California	75
3	Arkansas	64

Quarterfinals; March 26
1	SMU	67
2	California	65

First round March 18–19
1	St. John's	78
8	Robert Morris	89
4	Green Bay	65
5	Belmont	80
2	Illinois	66
7	Boston University	62
3	Clemson	78
6	Georgia State	66

Second round March 21, 23
8	Robert Morris	71
5	Belmont	82
2	Illinois	49
3	Clemson	50

Quarterfinals; March 25
5	Belmont	68
3	Clemson	73

*#2 Illinois played at #7 Boston University and at #3 Clemson due to State Farm Center renovations.

First round March 18–19
1	Minnesota	88
8	High Point	81
4	Saint Mary's	70
5	Utah	58
2	Missouri	85
7	Davidson	77
3	Southern Miss	66
6	Toledo	59

Second round March 23
1	Minnesota	63
4	Saint Mary's	55
2	Missouri	63
3	Southern Miss	71

Quarterfinals; March 25
1	Minnesota	81
3	Southern Miss	73

First round March 18–19
1	Florida State	58
8	Florida Gulf Coast	53
4	Georgetown	77
5	West Virginia	65
2	Georgia	63
7	Vermont	56
3	Louisiana Tech	89
6	Iona	88

Second round March 22, 24
1	Florida State	101
4	Georgetown	90
2	Georgia	71
3	Louisiana Tech	79

Quarterfinals; March 26
1	Florida State	78
3	Louisiana Tech	75

Semifinals; April 1
1	SMU	65
3	Clemson	59
1	Minnesota	67^{OT}
1	Florida State	64

Final; April 3
1	SMU	63
1	Minnesota	65

== Media ==
ESPN has exclusive television rights to all NIT games. They aired every single game across ESPN, ESPN2, ESPNU and ESPN3. Since 2011 Westwood One has held exclusive radio rights to the semifinals and championship. In 2014, John Tautges and Kelly Tripucka called these games for Westwood One.

== See also ==
- 2014 Women's National Invitation Tournament
- 2014 NCAA Division I men's basketball tournament
- 2014 NCAA Division II men's basketball tournament
- 2014 NCAA Division III men's basketball tournament
- 2014 NCAA Division I women's basketball tournament
- 2014 NCAA Division II women's basketball tournament
- 2014 NCAA Division III women's basketball tournament
- 2014 NAIA Division I men's basketball tournament
- 2014 NAIA Division II men's basketball tournament
- 2014 NAIA Division I women's basketball tournament
- 2014 NAIA Division II women's basketball tournament
- 2014 College Basketball Invitational
- 2014 CollegeInsider.com Postseason Tournament
