= Duke Mondy =

American professional basketball player (born 1990)

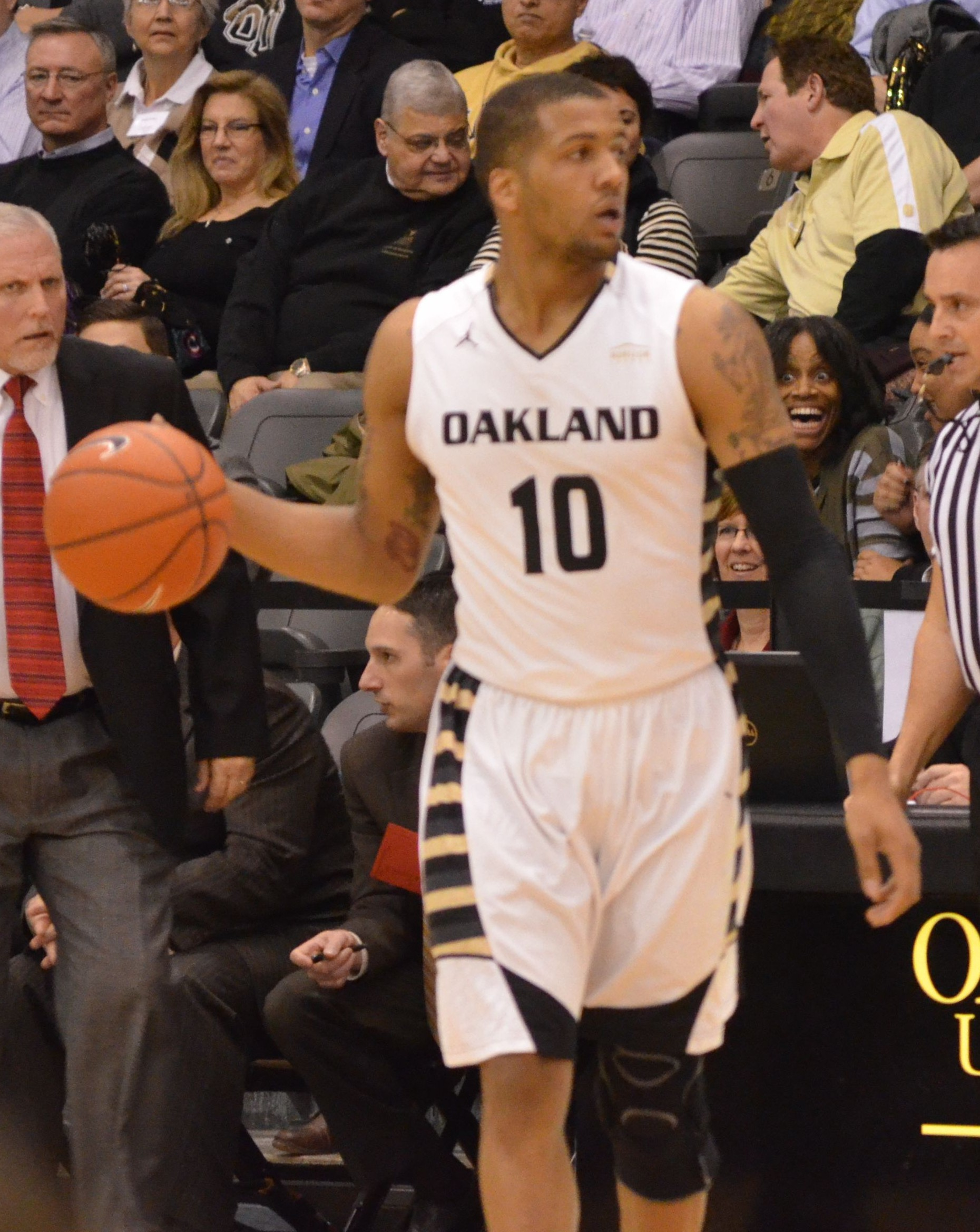
- Mondy in a 2014 game against Youngstown State

Personal information
- Born: December 2, 1990 (age 35)
- Listed height: 6 ft 4 in (1.93 m)
- Listed weight: 205 lb (93 kg)

Career information
- High school: Catholic Central (Grand Rapids, Michigan)
- College: Providence (2009–2011); Oakland (2012–2014)
- NBA draft: 2014: undrafted
- Playing career: 2014–2024
- Position: Shooting guard / point guard

Career history
- 2016–2017: Arantia Larochette
- 2017–2018: Cape Breton Highlanders
- 2018: Texas Legends
- 2019: Sioux Falls Skyforce
- 2019: Ostioneros de Guaymas
- 2019–2020: GTK Gliwice
- 2021: Odesa
- 2021: Cafeteros de Armenia
- 2023–2024: Cangrejeros de Monagas
- 2024: Grand Rapids Gold

Career highlights
- NCAA steals leader (2013); The Summit League Newcomer of the Year (2013); Horizon League All-Defensive team (2014)

Murray Deshawn "Duke" Mondy (born December 2, 1990) is an American former professional basketball player who last played for the Grand Rapids Gold of the NBA G League. He played college basketball for the Oakland Golden Grizzlies where he led the National Collegiate Athletic Association (NCAA) Division I in steals per game during his junior season, averaging 3.03 steals per game.

== High school career ==
Mondy attended Catholic Central High School in Grand Rapids, Michigan and was rated a two-star recruit by both Scout.com and Rivals.com. He received scholarship offers from Providence and Central Michigan.

== College career ==
Mondy started his career at Providence before transferring to Oakland following his sophomore season. Mondy led the Big East Conference in steals his sophomore season and led The Summit League in steals his redshirt junior season. Oakland switched to the Horizon League prior to his senior season. If Mondy leads the Horizon League in steals, he will become the first player in NCAA history to lead three different conferences in steals.

Mondy majors in Integrative Studies at Oakland.

=== Freshman season ===
Mondy averaged 3.4 points, 2.0 rebounds and 1.2 assists per game as a true freshman at Providence. The team finished with a 12–19 record.

=== Sophomore season ===
During his last season at Providence, Mondy let the Big East in steals per game with 2.1. He averaged 7.7 points, 3.3 rebounds and 1.2 assists per game. He received the team's Marvin Barnes Defensive Player of the Year award.

=== Junior season ===
Due to NCAA transfer rules, Mondy transferred to Oakland and was required to sit out a season . He used his redshirt season during 2011–12 in order to have two years of eligibility remaining at Oakland.

During his redshirt junior season in 2012–13, Mondy led the NCAA steals leader, averaging 3.03. He also set the Oakland single season record with 100 steals.

Mondy was named The Summit League's Newcomer of the Year and All-League Second Team after leading the league in steals and assists per game (6.0). He was the conference Player of the Week on January 7, 2013, after averaging 14.5 points, 5.5 assists, 4.0 steals and 3.0 rebounds against Nebraska–Omaha and Alabama.

=== Senior season ===
Mondy and teammate Dante Williams were arrested the morning of November 14 on rape charges in Culver City, California. The Los Angeles County District Attorney declined to press charges due to a lack of evidence. Oakland conducted its own internal investigation and also determined that no crime was committed. The players were suspended for two games for violating curfew. Mondy missed three games total, against California, Gonzaga and Louisiana–Lafayette.

Mondy set a career high for steals in a game against Indiana team with seven. He matched that total in his next game against No. 5 Michigan State.

Mondy sprained the MCL in his knee December 22 against Robert Morris. He was expected to miss one to four weeks of games but only missed the team's next game against Defiance College.

In the January 26, 2014, game against Illinois–Chicago, Mondy made a three-point field goal at the buzzer to give Oakland a 76–75 win. Mondy received the inbounds pass under his own basket with 4.4 seconds on the clock. He dribbled the length of the court before hitting the pull up shot. Officials reviewed video of the play for approximately five minutes to determine if his foot was on the three-point line before confirming the attempt was indeed a three-pointer.

=== Statistics ===
Year	Team	GP	GS	MPG	FGM	FGA	FG%	3PM	3PA	3P%	FTM	FTA	FT%	REB	RPG	AST	APG	STL	SPG	BLK	PTS	PPG
2009–10	Providence	31	1	13.5	38	111	.342	19	71	.268	10	15	.667	62	2.0	36	1.2	34	1.1	3	105	3.4
2010–11	Providence	28	4	27.1	70	198	.354	47	152	.309	28	44	.636	93	3.3	33	1.2	59	2.1	7	215	7.7
2011–12	Oakland	Did not play – redshirt																				
2012–13	Oakland	33	21	31.3	141	353	.399	35	111	.315	79	96	.823	144	4.4	168	5.1	100	3.0	10	396	12.0
2013–14	Oakland	29	28	33.0	114	287	.397	28	86	.326	82	120	.683	144	5.0	121	4.2	90	3.1	10	338	11.7
Career		121	54	26.2	363	949	.383	129	420	.307	199	275	.724	443	3.7	358	3.0	283	2.3	30	1,054	8.7

Bold italics indicates led NCAA Division I

== Professional career ==
=== D-League ===
On November 1, 2014, Mondy was selected by the Rio Grande Valley Vipers in the fourth round the 2014 NBA Development League Draft. However, he was later waived by the Vipers on November 14 prior to the start of the regular season.

After sitting out the 2014–15 season, Mondy again entered the NBA Development League draft, this time being selected by the Westchester Knicks in the sixth round of the 2015 edition. He again failed to make the team's final roster, getting cut by the Knicks on November 7.

=== Arantia Larochette ===
In 2016, Mondy signed with Luxembourgish club Arantia Larochette in the Total League.

=== Cape Breton Highlanders ===
In 2017, Mondy signed with Canadian club the Cape Breton Highlanders in NBL Canada.

=== NBA G League ===
On February 16, 2018, Mondy was acquired by the Texas Legends.

On October 23, 2021, Mondy signed with the Memphis Hustle. He did not make the final roster.

=== Cafeteros de Armenia (2021) ===
On November 17, 2021, Mondy signed with the Cafeteros de Armenia of the Baloncesto Profesional Colombiano.

=== Cangrejeros de Monagas (2023–2024) ===
On February 7, 2023, Mondy signed with the Cangrejeros de Monagas of the Superliga Profesional de Baloncesto.

=== Grand Rapids Gold (2024) ===
On March 24, 2024, Mondy joined the Grand Rapids Gold of the NBA G League.

== Career statistics ==
=== Domestic Leagues ===
==== Regular season ====
Legend
GP	Games played	MPG	Minutes per game	FG%	Field goal percentage
3P%	3-point field goal percentage	FT%	Free throw percentage	RPG	Rebounds per game
APG	Assists per game	SPG	Steals per game	BPG	Blocks per game
PPG	Points per game	**Bold**	Career high		Led the league

Note: Only games in the primary domestic competitions are included. Therefore, games in cup or European competitions are left out.

Year	Team	League	GP	MPG	FG%	3P%	FT%	RPG	APG	SPG	BPG	PPG
2016–17	(Luxembourg) Arantia Larochette	Total League	18	37.3	.461	.410	.837	5.4	5.3	3.0	0.1	22.5
