= 2013–14 Youngstown State Penguins men's basketball team =

American college basketball season

2013–14 Youngstown State Penguins men's basketball
- Conference: Horizon League
- Record: 15–17 (6–10 Horizon)
- Head coach: Jerry Slocum (9th season)
- Assistant coaches: Michael Wernicki; Brian DePaoli; Steve Hall
- Home arena: Beeghly Center

2013–14 Horizon League men's basketball standings
	Conf.				Overall
Team	W		L	PCT	W		L	PCT
Green Bay	14	–	2	.875	24	–	7	.774
Cleveland State	12	–	4	.750	21	–	12	.636
Wright State	10	–	6	.625	21	–	15	.583
Valparaiso	9	–	7	.563	18	–	16	.529
Milwaukee †	7	–	9	.438	21	–	14	.600
Oakland	7	–	9	.438	13	–	20	.394
Youngstown State	6	–	10	.375	15	–	17	.469
Detroit	6	–	10	.375	13	–	19	.406
UIC	1	–	15	.063	6	–	25	.194
† 2014 Horizon League Tournament winner

The 2013–14 Youngstown State Penguins men's basketball team represented Youngstown State University during the 2013–14 NCAA Division I men's basketball season. The Penguins, led by ninth year head coach Jerry Slocum, played their home games at the Beeghly Center and were members of the Horizon League. They finished the season 15–17, 6–10 in Horizon League play to finish in a tie for seventh place. They lost in the first round of the Horizon League tournament to Oakland.

== Roster ==
Number	Name	Position	Height	Weight	Year	Hometown
1	Jalon Plummer	Guard	6–5	180	Freshman	Belleville, Michigan
2	Kyle Steward	Forward	6–7	190	Freshman	Detroit, Michigan
3	Kendrick Perry	Guard	6–0	175	Senior	Ocoee, Florida
4	Shawn Amiker	Guard	6–5	185	Junior	Oak Park, Michigan
5	Kamren Belin	Forward	6–7	235	Senior	Atlanta, Georgia
10	Marcus Keene	Guard	5–11	160	Freshman	San Antonio, Texas
11	DJ Cole	Guard	5–11	175	Junior	Olathe, Kansas
14	Josh Chojnacki	Forward	6–9	240	Senior	Erie, Pennsylvania
20	Bobby Hain	Forward	6–10	235	Sophomore	Jupiter, Florida
23	Ronnye Beamon	Guard	6–4	195	Freshman	Calumet City, Illinois
25	Fletcher Larson	Forward	6–8	215	Junior	Lakewood, New York
32	Larry Johnson Jr.	Forward	6–4	220	Sophomore	Oak Park, Michigan
33	Ryan Weber	Forward	6–6	200	Sophomore	Indianapolis, Indiana
34	Mike Podolsky	Guard	6–1	214	Senior	Canfield, Ohio

== Schedule ==
Date time, TV	Opponent	Result	Record	Site (attendance) city, state
Regular season
11/08/2013*; 7:30 pm	at Kennesaw State; Kennesaw State Tournament	W 73–57	1–0	KSU Convocation Center (1,412); Kennesaw, GA
11/09/2013*; 3:00 pm	vs. FIU; Kennesaw State Tournament	W 74–72 ^{OT}	2–0	KSU Convocation Center (N/A); Kennesaw, GA
11/10/2013*; 1:00 pm	vs. Eastern Kentucky; Kennesaw State Tournament	W 75–67	3–0	KSU Convocation Center (N/A); Kennesaw, GA
11/14/2013*; 7:05 pm	Warren Wilson; Kennesaw State Tournament	W 104–58	4–0	Beeghly Center (1,402); Youngstown, OH
11/17/2013*; 1:00 am	at UMass	L 69–85	4–1	Mullins Center (N/A); Amherst, MA
11/20/2013*; 7:45 pm	Thiel	W 82–58	5–1	Beeghly Center (1,428); Youngstown, OH
11/23/2013*; 11:15 am	Westminster College	W 108–57	6–1	Beeghly Center (1,201); Youngstown, OH
11/27/2013*; 7:00 pm	at Kent State	L 79–83	6–2	MAC Center (1,963); Kent, OH
11/30/2013*; 7:05 pm	Austin Peay	L 86–88	6–3	Beeghly Center (1,460); Youngstown, OH
12/04/2013*; 7:45 pm	Robert Morris	W 84–76	7–3	Beeghly Center (N/A); Youngstown, OH
12/07/2013*; 1:05 pm	at UMKC	L 80–88	7–4	Swinney Recreation Center (1,067); Kansas City, MO
12/14/2013*; 12:00 pm	at Pittsburgh	L 73–91	7–5	Petersen Events Center (8,621); Pittsburgh, PA
12/17/2013*; 7:05 pm	Bethune–Cookman	W 71–59	8–5	Beeghly Center (1,399); Youngstown, OH
12/21/2013*; 7:05 pm	at St. Johns	L 87–96	8–6	Carnesecca Arena (4,248); Queens, NY
12/29/2013*; 2:05 pm	South Dakota	W 85–59	9–6	Beeghly Center (1,872); Youngstown, OH
1/02/2014; 8:00 pm	at Milwaukee	L 76–82	9–7 (0–1)	U.S. Cellular Arena (2,362); Milwaukee, WI
1/04/2014; 2:00 pm	at Green Bay	L 69–85	9–8 (0–2)	Resch Center (2,644); Green Bay, WI
1/07/2014; 8:00 pm	at UIC	W 75–62	10–8 (1–2)	UIC Pavilion (N/A); Chicago, IL
1/13/2014; 7:05 pm	Cleveland State	W 67–66	11–8 (2–2)	Beeghly Center (2,855); Youngstown, OH
1/18/2014; 7:00 pm	Detroit	W 77–63	12–8 (3–2)	Beeghly Center (3,447); Youngstown, OH
1/23/2014; 7:05 pm	Valparaiso	L 71–74	12–9 (3–3)	Beeghly Center (1,938); Youngstown, OH
1/25/2014; 7:05 pm	Wright State	W 68–67	13–9 (4–3)	Beeghly Center (4,743); Youngstown, OH
1/31/2014; 7:00 pm	at Oakland	L 85–86	13–10 (4–4)	Athletics Center O'rena (2,952); Rochester, MI
2/05/2014; 7:00 pm	at Wright State	L 67–77	13–11 (4–5)	Nutter Center (3,713); Fairborn, OH
2/09/2014; 2:00 pm	at Detroit	L 81–83 ^{OT}	13–12 (4–6)	Calihan Hall (3,048); Detroit, MI
2/13/2014; 7:05 pm	Green Bay	L 40–71	13–13 (4–7)	Beeghly Center (2,153); Youngstown, OH
2/15/2014; 7:05 pm	UIC	W 59–56	14–13 (5–7)	Beeghly Center (3,559); Youngstown, OH
2/20/2014; 7:05 pm	Milwaukee	W 88–83 ^{OT}	15–13 (6–7)	Beeghly Center (1,505); Youngstown, OH
2/22/2014; 8:05 pm	at Valparaiso	L 66–68	15–14 (6–8)	Athletics–Recreation Center (3,657); Valparaiso, IN
2/25/2014; 7:00 pm	at Cleveland State	L 69–70 ^{OT}	15–15 (6–9)	Wolstein Center (2,641); Cleveland, OH
3/01/2014; 7:05 pm	Oakland	L 81–87	15–16 (6–10)	Beeghly Center (4,392); Youngstown, OH
2014 Horizon League tournament
3/04/2014; 7:00 pm	at Oakland; First round	L 92–96 ^{OT}	15–17	Athletics Center O'rena (2,283); Rochester, MI
*Non-conference game. ^{#}Rankings from AP Poll. (#) Tournament seedings in parentheses. All times are in Eastern Time.
