= 2013–14 Cleveland State Vikings men's basketball team =

American college basketball season

2013–14 Cleveland State Vikings men's basketball

CIT, First round
- Conference: Horizon League
- Record: 21–12 (12–4 Horizon)
- Head coach: Gary Waters
- Assistant coaches: Larry DeSimpelare; Jermaine Kimbrough; Cornelius Jackson
- Home arena: Wolstein Center

2013–14 Horizon League men's basketball standings
	Conf.				Overall
Team	W		L	PCT	W		L	PCT
Green Bay	14	–	2	.875	24	–	7	.774
Cleveland State	12	–	4	.750	21	–	12	.636
Wright State	10	–	6	.625	21	–	15	.583
Valparaiso	9	–	7	.563	18	–	16	.529
Milwaukee †	7	–	9	.438	21	–	14	.600
Oakland	7	–	9	.438	13	–	20	.394
Youngstown State	6	–	10	.375	15	–	17	.469
Detroit	6	–	10	.375	13	–	19	.406
UIC	1	–	15	.063	6	–	25	.194
† 2014 Horizon League Tournament winner

The 2013–14 Cleveland State Vikings men's basketball team represented Cleveland State University in the 2013–14 NCAA Division I men's basketball season. Their head coach was Gary Waters. The Vikings played their home games at the Wolstein Center and were members of the Horizon League. It was the 83rd season of Cleveland State basketball. They finished the season 21–12, 12–4 in Horizon League play to finish in second place. They lost in the semifinals of the Horizon League tournament to Wright State. They were invited to the CollegeInsider.com Tournament where they lost in the first round to Ohio.

== Roster ==
2013–14 Cleveland State Vikings men's basketball team
Players
Coaches

Pos.	#	Name	Height	Weight	Year	Hometown
F	0	Derek Sloan	6 ft 5 in (1.96 m)	210 lb (95 kg)	Fr	Moreland Hills, OH
G	1	Sebastian Douglas	6 ft 4 in (1.93 m)	205 lb (93 kg)	Jr	Houston, TX
G	2	Bryn Forbes	6 ft 3 in (1.91 m)	175 lb (79 kg)	So	Lansing, MI
G	3	Trey Lewis	6 ft 2 in (1.88 m)	190 lb (86 kg)	So	Garfield Heights, OH
C	4	Devon Long	6 ft 7 in (2.01 m)	260 lb (118 kg)	Sr	Highland Park, MI
C	5	Ismaila Dauda	6 ft 10 in (2.08 m)	250 lb (113 kg)	Jr	Kano, Nigeria
G	11	Andre Yates	6 ft 0 in (1.83 m)	185 lb (84 kg)	So	Dayton, OH
F	20	Raphael Veira	6 ft 5 in (1.96 m)	200 lb (91 kg)	Sr	Cleveland, OH
F	21	Marlin Mason	6 ft 6 in (1.98 m)	215 lb (98 kg)	Jr	Detroit, MI
G	23	Khyler Fields	5 ft 11 in (1.8 m)	170 lb (77 kg)	So	Massillon, OH
F	24	Ludovic Ndaye	6 ft 9 in (2.06 m)	240 lb (109 kg)	Sr	Montreal, Quebec
G	31	Charlie Lee	5 ft 8 in (1.73 m)	160 lb (73 kg)	Jr	Milwaukee, WI
C	32	Aaron Scales	6 ft 9 in (2.06 m)	260 lb (118 kg)	So	High Point, NC
F	33	Demonte Flannigan	6 ft 7 in (2.01 m)	240 lb (109 kg)	Fr	Richmond Height, OH
F	35	Jon Harris	6 ft 7 in (2.01 m)	215 lb (98 kg)	Sr	Twinsburg, OH

Head coach

- Gary Waters (Ferris State)

Assistant coach(es)

- Larry DeSimpelare (Spring Arbor)
- Jermaine Kimbrough (Virginia Tech)
- Cornelius Jackson (Marshall)

Legend

- (C) Team captain
- (S) Suspended
- (I) Ineligible
- (W) Walk-on
- Injured
- Current redshirt

Roster
Last update: 2013-12-29

== Schedule ==
Date time, TV	Opponent	Result	Record	High points	High rebounds	High assists	Site (attendance) city, state
Exhibition
Nov 5*; 7:00 pm	Lake Erie College	W 78–62	1–0	21 – Forbes	9 – Mason, Harris	6 – Lewis	Wolstein Center (1,179); Cleveland, OH
Regular season
Nov 9*; 2:00 pm	Iona	W 73–69	1–0	22 – Forbes	11 – Grady	5 – Lewis	Wolstein Center (2,251); Cleveland, OH
Nov 13*; 11:00 pm	at San Francisco	L 82–91	1–1	15 – Douglas, Lee	5 – Douglas, Harris	5 – Lee, Lewis	War Memorial Gymnasium (1,433); San Francisco, CA
Nov 15*; 8:30 pm	at Texas–Arlington; Keightley Classic	W 83–73	2–1	24 – Forbes	5 – Forbes, Harris, Lee	3 – Lee, Lewis	College Park Center (4,824); Arlington, TX
Nov 18*; 7:00 pm	at Eastern Michigan; Keightley Classic	L 69–81	2–2	22 – Forbes	8 – Harris, Lewis	3 – Douglas, Lee	Convocation Center (825); Ypsilanti, MI
Nov 23*; 3:00 pm	Robert Morris; Keightley Classic	W 87–74	3–2	18 – Forbes	7 – Harris	4 – Grady, Lee, Lewis	Wolstein Center (2,755); Cleveland, OH
Nov 25*; 7:00 pm, STO	at No. 3 Kentucky; Keightley Classic	L 61–68	3–3	22 – Forbes	6 – Douglas, Harris	4 – Lewis	Rupp Arena (21,067); Lexington, KY
Nov 30*; 7:00 pm	Ball State	W 78–55	4–3	23 – Lewis	8 – Harris	4 – Lewis	Wolstein Center (1,991); Cleveland, OH
Dec 4*; 7:00 pm	at Drexel	L 82–85 ^{3OT}	4–4	27 – Harris	9 – Grady	8 – Lewis	Daskalakis Athletic Center (2,127); Philadelphia, PA
Dec 7*; 2:00 pm	Akron	L 61–73	4–5	14 – Lee	8 – Harris	3 – Lewis	Wolstein Center (3,079); Cleveland, OH
Dec 16*; 7:00 pm	Western Carolina	W 66–55	5–5	16 – Douglas	6 – Harris, Lewis	3 – Lee	Wolstein Center (1,163); Cleveland, OH
Dec 18*; 7:00 pm	Notre Dame (OH)	W 97–72	6–5	27 – Forbes	6 – Grady, Harris, Mason	4 – Forbes, Lewis	Wolstein Center (1,121); Cleveland, OH
Dec 21*; 2:00 pm	at Toledo	L 67–71	6–6	21 – Lewis	6 – Lewis	4 – Lee	Savage Arena (4,207); Toledo, OH
Dec 23*; 3:00 pm	La Roche	W 89–42	7–6	19 – Grady	6 – Forbes	5 – Douglas, Lewis	Wolstein Center (1,069); Cleveland, OH
Dec 28*; 7:00 pm	at Kent State	W 78–70	8–6	16 – Douglas, Forbes	7 – Douglas	5 – Forbes	Memorial Athletic and Convocation Center (4,553); Kent, OH
Jan 2; 8:00 pm	at Green Bay	L 55–66	8–7 (0–1)	11 – Lewis, Mason	10 – Grady, Mason	4 – Lee, Lewis	Resch Center (2,298); Green Bay, WI
Jan 4; 8:00 pm	at Milwaukee	W 77–49	9–7 (1–1)	19 – Grady	11 – Grady	4 – Lee, Lewis	U.S. Cellular Arena (2,846); Milwaukee, WI
Jan 8; 7:00 pm	Detroit	W 73–63	10–7 (2–1)	18 – Harris	8 – Grady	9 – Lee	Wolstein Center (2,153); Cleveland, OH
Jan 13; 7:00 pm, STO	at Youngstown State	L 66–67	10–8 (2–2)	17 – Forbes	7 – Grady	4 – Grady	Beeghly Center (2,855); Youngstown, OH
Jan 16; 5:30 pm, STO	Oakland	W 86–76	11–8 (3–2)	29 – Lewis	7 – Harris	5 – Lee	Wolstein Center (1,777); Cleveland, OH
Jan 19; 1:00 pm	Wright State	L 46–49	11–9 (3–3)	17 – Harris	11 – Harris	3 – Lee, Lewis	Wolstein Center (2,023); Cleveland, OH
Jan 22; 8:00 pm	at UIC	W 74–64	12–9 (4–3)	20 – Forbes	10 – Harris	5 – Lee, Lewis	UIC Pavilion (1,681); Chicago, IL
Jan 25; 2:00 pm	Valparaiso	W 69–50	13–9 (5–3)	17 – Lewis	11 – Grady	4 – Lee, Lewis	Wolstein Center (2,331); Cleveland, OH
Jan 28*; 8:00 pm	at Eastern Illinois	W 82–68	14–9	25 – Forbes	9 – Lewis	5 – Lewis	Lantz Arena (582); Charleston, IL
Jan 31; 7:00 pm, ESPNU	at Detroit	W 86–78	15–9 (6–3)	27 – Forbes	9 – Grady	7 – Lee	Calihan Hall (2,490); Detroit, MI
Feb 6; 7:00 pm, STO	at Oakland	W 92–85	16–9 (7–3)	31 – Lee	9 – Grady	6 – Lee	Athletics Center O'Rena (2,631); Rochester, MI
Feb 8; 1:00 pm, ESPN2	at Wright State	W 72–68	17–9 (8–3)	25 – Lee	12 – Grady	3 – Lee, Lewis	Nutter Center (4,981); Fairborn, OH
Feb 13; 7:30 pm	UIC	W 73–53	18–9 (9–3)	18 – Lewis	9 – Harris	7 – Lee	Wolstein Center (3,079); Cleveland, OH
Feb 15; 3:00 pm, STO	Green Bay	L 54–68	18–10 (9–4)	20 – Lewis	9 – Mason	2 – Douglas, Grady, Lee	Wolstein Center (4,033); Cleveland, OH
Feb 22; 2:00 pm, TWCS	Milwaukee	W 74–50	19–10 (10–4)	14 – Lee	7 – Mason	4 – Lewis	Wolstein Center (2,079); Cleveland, OH
Feb 25; 7:00 pm	Youngstown State	W 70–69 ^{OT}	20–10 (11–4)	15 – Forbes	9 – Harris	5 – Lee	Wolstein Center (2,641); Cleveland, OH
Mar 1; 7:00 pm, STO	at Valparaiso	W 63–52	21–10 (12–4)	11 – Mason, Lewis	8 – Grady	6 – Lee	Athletics-Recreation Center (3,171); Valparaiso, IN
Horizon League tournament
Mar 8; 6:00 pm, ESPNU	vs. Wright State; Semifinals	L 63–68	21–11	16 – Lee	13 – Grady	4 – Kee	Resch Center (7,113); Green Bay, WI
CIT
Mar 19*; 7:00 pm	at Ohio; First round	L 62–64	21–12	20 – Forbes	9 – Forbes, Mason	6 – Lee	Convocation Center (3,261); Athens, OH
*Non-conference game. ^{#}Rankings from ESPN/USA Today Coaches Poll. (#) Tournament seedings in parentheses. All times are in Eastern Time..
