= 2013–14 Oakland Golden Grizzlies men's basketball team =

American college basketball season

2013–14 Oakland Golden Grizzlies men's basketball
- Conference: Horizon League
- Record: 13–20 (7–9 Horizon)
- Head coach: Greg Kampe (30th season)
- Associate head coach: Saddi Washington
- Assistant coaches: Darren Sorenson; Brandon Weems
- Home arena: Athletics Center O'rena

2013–14 Horizon League men's basketball standings
	Conf.				Overall
Team	W		L	PCT	W		L	PCT
Green Bay	14	–	2	.875	24	–	7	.774
Cleveland State	12	–	4	.750	21	–	12	.636
Wright State	10	–	6	.625	21	–	15	.583
Valparaiso	9	–	7	.563	18	–	16	.529
Milwaukee †	7	–	9	.438	21	–	14	.600
Oakland	7	–	9	.438	13	–	20	.394
Youngstown State	6	–	10	.375	15	–	17	.469
Detroit	6	–	10	.375	13	–	19	.406
UIC	1	–	15	.063	6	–	25	.194
† 2014 Horizon League Tournament winner

The 2013–14 Oakland Golden Grizzlies men's basketball team represented Oakland University during the 2013–14 NCAA Division I men's basketball season. The Golden Grizzlies, led by 30th year head coach Greg Kampe, played their home games at the Athletics Center O'rena and were first-year members of the Horizon League.

The 2013–14 season was the first for Oakland in the Horizon League. Previously, Oakland was a 15-year member of The Summit League where they won three regular season championships and three conference tournament championships. Their overall Summit League conference record was 155–89 (.635).

They finished the 2013–14 season 13–20, 7–9 in Horizon League play to finish in a tie for fifth place. They advanced to the second round of the Horizon League tournament where they lost to Wright State.

Senior shooting guard Travis Bader entered the season 100 three-point field goals behind JJ Redick for the NCAA career three-point field goal record. On February 2, 2014, Bader passed JJ Redick for the career NCAA Division I record for three-point FGs made. Five games later, Bader broke the record for the most career three-point FGs attempted.

== 2013 recruiting class ==
The Golden Grizzlies brought in three freshmen from high school detailed in the following table.

College recruiting
Name	Hometown	School	Height	Weight	Commit date
Jalen Hayes; Power forward	Lansing, MI	J. W. Sexton High School	6 ft 7 in (2.01 m)	200 lb (91 kg)	Aug 29, 2012
Jalen Hayes; Power forward	Recruit ratings: Scout: Rivals: (67)				
Kahlil Felder; Point guard	Detroit, MI	Pershing High School	5 ft 9 in (1.75 m)	165 lb (75 kg)	September 17, 2012
Kahlil Felder; Point guard	Recruit ratings: Scout: Rivals: (69)				
Nick Daniels; Point guard	Westland, MI	John Glenn High School	6 ft 1 in (1.85 m)	160 lb (73 kg)	
Nick Daniels; Point guard	Recruit ratings: Scout: Rivals: (66)				
Overall recruit ranking: Scout: N/A Rivals: N/A
Note: In many cases, Scout, Rivals, 247Sports, On3, and ESPN may conflict in their listings of height and weight.; In these cases, the average was taken. ESPN grades are on a 100-point scale.; Sources: "Oakland Basketball Commitment List". Rivals.; "ESPN – Oakland Golden Grizzlies Basketball Recruiting 2013". ESPN.; "2013 Team Ranking". Rivals.

== Preseason ==
Preseason poll
School	Points
Green Bay (21)	390
Wright St. (22)	389
Cleveland St. (2)	338
Oakland (1)	258
Youngstown St. (1)	219
Valparaiso	205
UIC	151
Detroit	141
Milwaukee	69
First place votes in parentheses.

Oakland was picked by coaches, media and sports information directors to finish fourth in their first season in the Horizon League. They received one vote for first place. Senior shooting guard Travis Bader was selected to the preseason first team. Bader entered the season 100 three-point field goals behind JJ Redick for the NCAA career three-point field goal record.

The Golden Grizzlies lost senior captain Drew Valentine to graduation from the 2012–13 team. Valentine became a graduate manager for the Michigan State Spartans men's basketball team. Valentine's brother Denzel is a sophomore on the team.

Prior to the start of the season, senior guard Ryan Bass left the team for unspecified reasons. However, he remains on the team's roster. In January, coach Greg Kampe announced Bass will not play basketball this season. Bass started 24 games the previous season and averaged 26.6 minutes per game, 9.3 points per game and 2.7 assists per game.

Freshman guard Nick Daniels broke his foot during a preseason practice. He is expected to be unavailable to play for eight weeks. A true freshman, Daniels received all-state awards as a senior at John Glenn High School in Westland, Michigan.

Oakland defeated Tiffin 76–52 and Lake Superior State 88–61 in exhibition games prior to opening up the season against North Carolina.

== Season ==
The Golden Grizzlies opened the season with seven consecutive losses (five road games and two neutral site games), including three games against teams in the AP Poll's Top 25. Their first win came at home against National Association of Intercollegiate Athletics member Rochester College. Their first NCAA win came in the next game against Ohio of the Mid-American Conference.

Duke Mondy and Dante Williams were arrested the morning of November 14 on rape charges in Culver City, California. The team was in California during a West Coast road trip. The Los Angeles County District Attorney declined to press charges due to a lack of evidence. The players were suspended for two games for violating curfew. They missed the November 15 and 17 games against California and Gonzaga.

Oakland lost their first Horizon League game on the road against Wright State. They defeated former The Summit League rival Valparaiso in their first conference home game 75–70. In that game, Oakland trailed by 15 points (57–42) with 12:44 remaining in the second half before coming back to win.

In their first meeting since the 2003–04 season, Oakland defeated Detroit at Calihan Hall 77–69. Oakland trailed in the game by 11 (59–48) with 8:10 remaining in the second half before going on a 29–10 run to finish the game.

In the January 26, 2014, game against Illinois–Chicago (UIC), Mondy made a three-point field goal at the buzzer to give Oakland a 76–75 win. Mondy received the inbounds pass under his own basket with 4.4 seconds on the clock. He dribbled the length of the court before hitting the pull up shot. Officials reviewed video of the play for approximately five minutes to determine if his foot was on the three-point line before confirming the attempt was indeed a three-pointer.

In each of Oakland's four league wins, they have trailed in the second half. In the Valparaiso game Oakland trailed 57–42 with 12:44 remaining, in the Detroit game they trailed 59–48 with 8:10 remaining, in the UIC game they trailed 70–65 with 1:57 remaining and in the Youngstown State game they trailed 63–52 with 13:43 to go. Ken Pomeroy's in-game win probabilities gave Oakland a 6.4%, 3.1%, 18.4% and 11.5% chance, respectively, of winning each game.

=== Awards ===
The Golden Grizzlies have received seven Horizon League Player of the Week awards.

==== Travis Bader ====
Bader was named Horizon League co-Player of the Week for the week of December 16–22. Bader made 21 three-point field goals in three games. He recorded the first double-double of his career against Illinois State and made 10 of 15 three-pointers in a loss to Eastern Michigan. He averaged 26 points per game for the week and made 58.3% of this three-pointers while Oakland went 2–1. He shared the award with Green Bay's Alec Brown.

==== Kahlil Felder ====
Freshman point guard Kahlil Felder was named Horizon League Freshman of the Week for the week of November 12–18. Felder scored 10 points against No. 24 UCLA, 13 points against California and 7 points against No. 15 Gonzaga. He played all 40 minutes against Gonzaga and California and had seven assists against Gonzaga.

Felder received his second Freshman of the Week award for the week of December 16–22. Felder recorded at least five assists in the three games Oakland played, going 2–1. He averaged 8.3 points per game and 6.7 assist per game during the week, with a high of 9 assists against Robert Morris.

After defeating rival Detroit on the road, Felder was named the Freshman of the Week for the third time. During the week of January 6–12, Felder scoring a career-high 25 points against Milwaukee and had 12 points and six assists against Detroit.

Felder received his fourth Freshman of the Week award for the week of January 20–26. Felder had 14 points and eight assists against first-place Green Bay. Felder also scored 21 points (9–11 field goals and 3–3 free throws) and nine assists in a win against UIC.

Felder received his fifth Freshman of the Week award for the week of January 27–February 2. This was his second consecutive award. During the week, Felder had his first career double–double with 19 points and a career-high 12 assists. He also made two free throws with 4.0 seconds left to give the Golden Grizzlies a one-point win over Youngstown State. In his second game of the week against Milwaukee, Felder had 10 points and nine assists. Felder also assisted on Bader's 458th career three-point field goal that set the NCAA Division I career record.

Felder won his sixth Freshman of the Week award for the week of February 10–16. Felder earned the first triple-double in Oakland's history and the eighth in the NCAA this season. He had 15 points, 10 rebounds and 11 assists in Oakland's 83–82 overtime win against rival Detroit while playing the entire 45 minutes of the game. For the week, Felder averaged 14.5 points, 5.5 rebounds and 7.0 assists per game.

== Roster ==
The following table lists Oakland's roster as of November 7, 2013.

Number	Name	Position	Height	Weight	Year	Hometown
0	Ralph Hill	Forward	6′ 6″	230	Junior (redshirt)	Westerville, Ohio
2	Dante Williams	Forward	6′ 6″	190	Junior	Ann Arbor, Michigan
3	Travis Bader	Guard	6′ 5″	190	Senior (redshirt)	Okemos, Michigan
4	Jalen Hayes	Forward	6′ 7″	200	Freshman	Lansing, Michigan
10	Duke Mondy	Guard	6′ 4″	205	Senior (redshirt)	Grand Rapids, Michigan
11	Nick Daniels	Guard	6′ 1″	165	Freshman	Westland, Michigan
12	Artis Cleveland	Center	6′ 10″	215	Freshman	Birmingham, Alabama
13	Mitch Baenziger	Guard	6′ 2″	200	Sophomore	Clarkston, Michigan
15	Lloyd Neely II	Forward	6′ 5″	250	Sophomore	Detroit, Michigan
20	Kahlil Felder	Point guard	5′ 9″	180	Freshman	Detroit, Michigan
21	Raphael Carter	Forward	6′ 9″	207	Senior	Columbus, Ohio
23	Tommie McCune	Forward	6′ 8″	205	Sophomore (redshirt)	Saginaw, Michigan
33	Ryan Bass	Guard	5′ 9″	170	Senior	Dayton, Ohio
42	Corey Petros	Center/Forward	6′ 10″	260	Junior (redshirt)	Macomb, Michigan
52	Joey Asbury	Forward	6′ 7″	230	Senior	Warren, Michigan

== Schedule ==
Date time, TV	Opponent	Result	Record	Site (attendance) city, state
Regular season
November 8, 2013*; 9:00 pm, RSNs	at No. 12 North Carolina	L 61-84	0–1	Dean Smith Center (15,102); Chapel Hill, NC
November 12, 2013*; 9:00 pm, P12N	at No. 24 UCLA	L 60-91	0–2	Pauley Pavilion (4,771); Los Angeles, CA
November 15, 2013*; 11:00 pm, P12N	at California; Maui Invitational	L 60-64	0–3	Haas Pavilion (4,975); Berkeley, CA
November 17, 2013*; 8:00 pm, ROOTNW	at No. 15 Gonzaga; Maui Invitational	L 67-82	0–4	McCarthey Athletic Center (6,000); Spokane, WA
November 23, 2013*; 6:30 pm	vs. Louisiana; Maui Invitational	L 75-84	0–5	HTC Center (1,550); Conway, SC
November 24, 2013*; 12:30 pm	vs. St. Francis Brooklyn; Maui Invitational	L 62-68	0–6	HTC Center (1,430); Conway, SC
November 26, 2013*; 7:00 pm	at Western Michigan	L 88-99	0–7	University Arena (2,228); Kalamazoo, MI
November 30, 2013*; 6:00 pm	Rochester	W 86–51	1–7	Athletics Center O'rena (1,435); Rochester, MI
December 7, 2013*; 6:00 pm	Ohio	W 73–56	2–7	Athletics Center O'rena (1,315); Rochester, MI
December 10, 2013*; 7:00 pm, ESPN2	at Indiana	L 54-81	2–8	Assembly Hall (17,472); Bloomington, IN
December 14, 2013*; 4:00 pm, ESPN2	vs. No. 5 Michigan State	L 63-67	2–9	The Palace of Auburn Hills (13,873); Auburn Hills, MI
December 16, 2013*; 7:00 pm	Illinois State	W 90–75	3–9	Athletics Center O'rena (1,005); Rochester, MI
December 21, 2013*; 1:00 pm	Eastern Michigan	L 79-81 ^{OT}	3–10	Athletics Center O'rena (1,507); Rochester, MI
December 22, 2013*; 1:00 pm	Robert Morris	W 100–94	4–10	Athletics Center O'rena (1,238); Rochester, MI
December 27, 2013*; 7:00 pm	Defiance College	W 87–66	5–10	Athletics Center O'rena (1,433); Rochester, MI
January 2, 2014; 7:00 pm	at Wright State	L 64-76	5–11 (0–1)	Nutter Center (3,542); Fairborn, OH
January 4, 2014; 6:00 pm	Valparaiso	W 75–70	6–11 (1–1)	Athletics Center O'rena (2,709); Rochester, MI
January 8, 2014; 7:00 pm	Milwaukee	L 75-84	6–12 (1–2)	Athletics Center O'rena (1,427); Rochester, MI
January 11, 2014; 7:00 pm, ESPN3	at Detroit	W 77–69	7–12 (2–2)	Calihan Hall (6,976); Detroit, MI
January 16, 2014; 5:30 pm	at Cleveland State	L 76-86	7–13 (2–3)	Wolstein Center (1,777); Cleveland, OH
January 22, 2014; 8:00 pm	at Green Bay	L 69-83	7–14 (2–4)	Resch Center (2,569); Green Bay, WI
January 25, 2014; 2:00 pm, ESPN3	UIC	W 76–75	8–14 (3–4)	Athletics Center O'rena (2,987); Rochester, MI
January 31, 2014; 7:00 pm, ESPN3	Youngstown State	W 86–85	9–14 (4–4)	Athletics Center O'rena (2,952); Rochester, MI
February 2, 2014; 1:00 pm	at Milwaukee	L 64-86	9–15 (4–5)	Klotsche Center (2,047); Milwaukee, WI
February 6, 2014; 7:00 pm	Cleveland State	L 85-92	9–16 (4–6)	Athletics Center O'rena (2,631); Rochester, MI
February 9, 2014; 2:35 pm	at Valparaiso	L 60-63	9–17 (4–7)	Athletics–Recreation Center (2,448); Valparaiso, IN
February 14, 2014; 7:00 pm, ESPNU	Detroit	W 83–82 ^{OT}	10–17 (5–7)	Athletics Center O'rena (4,065); Rochester, MI
February 16, 2014; 1:00 pm	Wright State	L 71-72	10–18 (5–8)	Athletics Center O'rena (2,411); Rochester, MI
February 21, 2014; 8:00 pm, ESPN3	at UIC	W 86–71	11–18 (6–8)	UIC Pavilion (2,697); Chicago, IL
February 27, 2014; 8:00 pm, ESPNU	Green Bay	L 63-71	11–19 (6–9)	Athletics Center O'rena (2,731); Rochester, MI
March 1, 2014; 7:05 pm	at Youngstown State	W 87–81	12–19 (7–9)	Beeghly Center (4,392); Youngstown, OH
2014 Horizon League tournament
March 4, 2014; 7:00 pm	Youngstown State; First round	W 96–92 ^{OT}	13–19	Athletics Center O'rena (2,283); Rochester, MI
March 7, 2014; 7:00 pm, ESPN3	vs. Wright State; Second round	L 57-73	13–20	Resch Center (1,770); Green Bay, WI
*Non-conference game. ^{#}Rankings from AP Poll. (#) Tournament seedings in parentheses. All times are in Eastern Time.
