= 2013–14 Detroit Titans men's basketball team =

American college basketball season

2013–14 Detroit Titans men's basketball
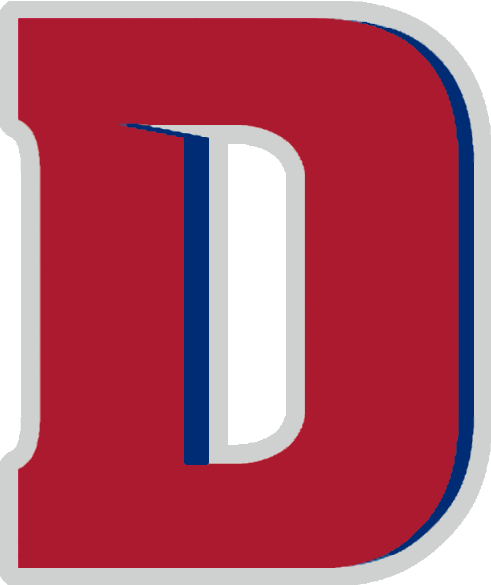
- Conference: Horizon League
- Record: 13–19 (6–10 Horizon)
- Head coach: Ray McCallum
- Assistant coaches: Ernie Zeigler; Jay Smith; Steve Payne
- Home arena: Calihan Hall

2013–14 Horizon League men's basketball standings
	Conf.				Overall
Team	W		L	PCT	W		L	PCT
Green Bay	14	–	2	.875	24	–	7	.774
Cleveland State	12	–	4	.750	21	–	12	.636
Wright State	10	–	6	.625	21	–	15	.583
Valparaiso	9	–	7	.563	18	–	16	.529
Milwaukee †	7	–	9	.438	21	–	14	.600
Oakland	7	–	9	.438	13	–	20	.394
Youngstown State	6	–	10	.375	15	–	17	.469
Detroit	6	–	10	.375	13	–	19	.406
UIC	1	–	15	.063	6	–	25	.194
† 2014 Horizon League Tournament winner

The 2013–14 Detroit Titans men's basketball team represented the University of Detroit Mercy in the 2013–14 NCAA Division I men's basketball season. Their head coach was Ray McCallum. The Titans played their home games at Calihan Hall and were members of the Horizon League. They finished the season 13–19, 6–10 in Horizon League play to finish in a tie for seventh place. They lost in the first round of the Horizon League tournament to Milwaukee.

== Roster ==
2013–14 Detroit Titans men's basketball team
Players
Coaches

Pos.	#	Name	Height	Weight	Year	Hometown
C	00	Olumide Solanke	6 ft 11 in (2.11 m)	244 lb (111 kg)	Sr	Lagos, Nigeria
G	1	Anton Wilson	6 ft 5 in (1.96 m)	191 lb (87 kg)	So	Flint, MI
F	2	Juwan Howard, Jr.	6 ft 6 in (1.98 m)	210 lb (95 kg)	RS Jr	Detroit, MI
F	4	Patrick Onwenu (redshirt)	6 ft 8 in (2.03 m)	210 lb (95 kg)	Jr	Southfield, MI
PG	5	Matthew Grant	6 ft 1 in (1.85 m)	165 lb (75 kg)	Fr	Los Angeles, CA
PG	11	Jarod Williams	6 ft 2 in (1.88 m)	168 lb (76 kg)	Fr	Danville, VA
C	15	Ugochukwu Njoku	6 ft 10 in (2.08 m)	220 lb (100 kg)	Sr	Lagos, Nigeria
F	21	Jermaine Lippert	6 ft 8 in (2.03 m)	230 lb (104 kg)	Sr	Munich, Germany
G	23	Carlton Brundidge	6 ft 3 in (1.91 m)	202 lb (92 kg)	RS So	Southfield, MI
C	32	Patrick Ackerman	6 ft 11 in (2.11 m)	225 lb (102 kg)	Jr	Rutland, MA
F	33	Evan Bruinsma	6 ft 8 in (2.03 m)	214 lb (97 kg)	Sr	New Era, MI
G/F	35	Paris Bass (C)	6 ft 8 in (2.03 m)	185 lb (84 kg)	Fr	Birmingham, MI

Head coach

- Ray McCallum (Ball State)

Assistant coach(es)

- Steve Payne
- Jay Smith (Saginaw Valley State)
- Ernie Zeigler

Legend

- (C) Team captain
- (S) Suspended
- (I) Ineligible
- (W) Walk-on
- Injured
- Current redshirt

Roster
Last update: 2013-11-08

== Schedule ==
Date time, TV	Opponent	Result	Record	Site (attendance) city, state
Regular season
11/08/2013*; 8:00 pm	at South Alabama	L 58–74	0–1	Mitchell Center (2,152); Mobile, AL
11/11/2013*; 7:30 pm, HLN	Michigan–Dearborn	W 106–51	1–1	Calihan Hall (1,645); Detroit, MI
11/14/2013*; 7:00 pm, ESPN3	at No. 19 UConn	L 55–101	1–2	Harry A. Gampel Pavilion (8,140); Storrs, CT
11/19/2013*; 7:00 pm	at James Madison	W 71–67	2–2	Convocation Center (4,030); Harrisonburg, VA
11/22/2013*; 7:00 pm, Comcast 900	Florida Atlantic; 2K Sports Classic	W 77–44	3–2	Calihan Hall (2,221); Detroit, MI
11/23/2013*; 5:30 pm, WADL	Toledo; 2K Sports Classic	L 78–80	3–3	Calihan Hall (2,230); Detroit, MI
11/24/2013*; 4:00 pm, Comcast 900	Stony Brook; 2K Sports Classic	L 102–104 ^{3OT}	3–4	Calihan Hall (1,669); Detroit, MI
11/30/2013*; 7:00 pm, ESPN3	at South Florida	W 65–60	4–4	USF Sun Dome (3,225); Tampa, FL
12/04/2013*; 7:00 pm	at Toledo	W 91–75	4–5	Savage Arena (4,357); Toledo, OH
12/08/2013*; 2:00 pm, WADL	Rhode Island	W 70–68	5–5	Calihan Hall (2,413); Detroit, MI
12/14/2013*; 6:00 pm, ESPN3	at NC State	L 79–82	5–6	PNC Arena (5,758); Raleigh, NC
12/18/2013*; 7:00 pm	at Akron	L 60–79	5–7	James A. Rhodes Arena (2,800); Akron, Oh
12/22/2013*; 2:00 pm	at Bowling Green	L 62–64	5–8	Stroh Center (1,410); Bowling Green, OH
12/23/2013*; 12:00 pm, HLN	Indiana Tech	W 93–50	6–8	Calihan Hall (1,341); Detroit, MI
12/30/2013*; 7:00 pm, Comcast 900	Bethune-Cookman	W 73–53	7–8	Calihan Hall (3,107); Detroit, MI
1/04/2014; 2:00 pm, WADL	Wright State	W 58–53	8–8 (1–0)	Calihan Hall (2,735); Detroit, MI
1/08/2014; 7:00 pm	at Cleveland State	L 63–73	8–9 (1–1)	Wolstein Center (2,153); Cleveland, OH
1/11/2014; 7:00 pm	Oakland	L 69–77	8–10 (1–2)	Calihan Hall (6,976); Detroit, MI
1/15/2014; 7:00 pm, Comcast 900	Valparaiso	L 70–78	8–11 (1–3)	Calihan Hall (1,602); Detroit, MI
1/18/2014; 7:00 pm	at Youngstown State	L 63–77	8–12 (1–4)	Beeghly Center (3,447); Youngstown, OH
1/24/2014; 8:00 pm	at Milwaukee	W 73–54	9–12 (2–4)	Klotsche Center (3,524); Milwaukee, WI
1/26/2014; 2:00 pm	at Green Bay	L 52–62	9–13 (2–5)	Resch Center (5,503); Ashwaubenon, WI
1/29/2014; 7:00 pm, WADL	UIC	W 74–68	10–13 (3–5)	Calihan Hall (1,452); Detroit, MI
1/31/2014; 7:00 pm, ESPNU	Cleveland State	L 78–86	10–14 (3–6)	Calihan Hall (2,490); Detroit, MI
2/07/2014; 9:00 pm, ESPNU	at Valparaiso	W 59–57	11–14 (4–6)	Athletics-Recreation Center (3,661); Valparaiso, IN
2/09/2014; 2:00 pm, Comcast 900	Youngstown State	W 83–81 ^{OT}	12–14 (5–6)	Calihan Hall (3,048); Detroit, MI
2/14/2014; 7:00 pm, ESPNU	at Oakland	L 82–83 ^{OT}	12–15 (5–7)	Athletics Center O'Rena (4,065); Rochester, MI
2/18/2014; 8:00 pm, ESPN3	at UIC	W 65–59	13–15 (6–7)	UIC Pavilion (2,538); Chicago, IL
2/21/2014; 10:00 pm, ESPNU	at Wright State	L 61–65	13–16 (6–8)	Nutter Center (5,042); Fairborn, OH
2/27/2014; 7:00 pm, Comcast 900	Milwaukee	L 62–68	13–17 (6–9)	Calihan Hall (2,078); Detroit, MI
3/01/2014; 4:00 pm, WADL	Green Bay	L 66–75	13–18 (6–10)	Calihan Hall (2,075); Detroit, MI
2014 Horizon League tournament
3/04/2014; 7:00 pm	at Milwaukee; First Round	L 73–83	13–19	U.S. Cellular Arena (1,204); Milwaukee, WI
*Non-conference game. ^{#}Rankings from AP Poll. (#) Tournament seedings in parentheses. All times are in Eastern Time.
