= 2014 CollegeInsider.com Postseason Tournament =

- Season: 2013–14
- Teams: 32
- Finals site: CFSB Center, Murray, Kentucky
- Champions: Murray State (1st title)
- Runner-up: Yale (1st title game)
- Semifinalists: VMI (1st semifinal); Pacific (2nd semifinal)
- Winning coach: Steve Prohm (1st title)
- MVP: Cameron Payne (Murray State)

The 2014 CollegeInsider.com Postseason Tournament (CIT) was a postseason single-elimination tournament of 32 NCAA Division I teams. The first round started March 17, 2014. The semifinals were played on April 1, with the championship game played on April 3, 2014.

32 participants who belong to "mid-major" conferences and were not invited to the 2014 NCAA Tournament, the 2014 National Invitation Tournament (NIT), or the 2014 College Basketball Invitational (CBI) made up the field.

The first three rounds were streamed online through the Collegeinsider.com platform powered by NeuLion. Free registration was required to view the games. Both semifinals and the CIT championship game, were televised on CBS Sports Network

In the championship game, the Murray State Racers defeated the Yale Bulldogs 65–57 in front of a crowd of 4,467 at Murray State's CFSB Center.

== Participating teams ==
The following teams received an invitation to the 2014 CIT:

School	Conference	Overall record	Conference record
Akron	Mid-American	21–12	12–6
Alabama State	SWAC	19–12	12–6
Brown	Ivy League	15–13	7–7
Canisius	MAAC	21–12	14–6
Chattanooga	Southern	18–14	12–4
Cleveland State	Horizon	21–11	12–4
Columbia	Ivy League	19–12	8–6
East Carolina	Conference USA	17–16	6–12
East Tennessee State	Atlantic Sun	18–15	10–8
Eastern Michigan	Mid-American	21–14	10–8
Grand Canyon	WAC	15–14	10–6
IPFW	Summit	24–10	10–4
Holy Cross	Patriot	19–13	12–6
Missouri State	Missouri Valley	20–12	9–9
Murray State	Ohio Valley	18–11	13–3
Nebraska–Omaha	Summit	16–14	5–9
Norfolk State	MEAC	19–14	11–5
North Dakota	Big Sky	17–16	12–8
Northern Colorado	Big Sky	18–13	11–9
Ohio	Mid-American	23–11	11–7
Pacific	West Coast	15–15	6–12
Portland State	Big Sky	17–14	11–9
Quinnipiac	MAAC	20–11	14–6
Sam Houston State	Southland	23–10	13–5
San Diego	West Coast	16–16	7–11
Texas A&M–Corpus Christi	Southland	17–15	14–4
Towson	Colonial	23–10	13–3
USC Upstate	Atlantic Sun	19–14	11–7
Wright State	Horizon	20–14	10–6
Valparaiso	Horizon	18–15	9–7
VMI	Big South	19–12	11–5
Yale	Ivy League	15–13	9–5

== Format ==
The sixth annual CIT again used the former NIT model in which match-ups in each round were re-seeded based on the results of the previous round.

== Schedule ==
Game	Date	Time	Matchup	Television
First round
1	March 17	7:00 pm	**Holy Cross** at Brown	
2	March 18	7:00 pm	**VMI** at Canisius	
3	March 18	7:00 pm	**Wright State** at East Carolina	
4	March 18	7:00 pm	Norfolk State at **Eastern Michigan**	
5	March 18	7:00 pm	Chattanooga at **East Tennessee State**	
6	March 18	8:00 pm	Alabama State at **Sam Houston State**	
7	March 18	8:05 pm	**Columbia** at Valparaiso	
8	March 18	10:00 pm	Portland State at **San Diego**	
9	March 19	7:00 pm	Quinnipiac at **Yale**	
10	March 19	7:00 pm	**Towson** at USC Upstate	
11	March 19	7:00 pm	Cleveland State at **Ohio**	
12	March 19	7:00 pm	Akron at **IPFW**	
13	March 19	8:00 pm	North Dakota at **Nebraska–Omaha**	
14	March 19	8:05 pm	**Murray State** at Missouri State	
15	March 19	9:00 pm	**Texas A&M–Corpus Christi** at Northern Colorado	
16	March 19	10:00 pm	**Pacific** at Grand Canyon	
Second round
17	March 21	7:00 pm	**Towson** at East Tennessee State	
18	March 22	1:00 pm	IPFW at **VMI**	
19	March 22	2:00 pm	Wright State at **Ohio**	
20	March 22	7:00 pm	**Yale** at Holy Cross	
21	March 22	7:00 pm	Eastern Michigan at **Columbia**	
22	March 22	7:00 pm	**San Diego** at Sam Houston State	
23	March 22	9:00 pm	Texas A&M–Corpus Christi at **Pacific**	
24	March 24	8:00 pm	Nebraska–Omaha at **Murray State**	
Quarterfinals
25	March 26	7:00 pm	**Yale** at Columbia	
26	March 26	7:00 pm	**VMI** at Ohio	
27	March 26	10:00 pm	San Diego at **Pacific**	
28	March 27	8:00 pm	Towson at **Murray State**	
Semifinals
29	April 1	7:00 pm	**Yale** at VMI	CBSSN
30	April 1	9:00 pm	Pacific at **Murray State**	CBSSN
Championship
31	April 3	7:00 pm	Yale at **Murray State**	CBSSN
All tipoff times in Eastern Time Zone. Winning team in **bold**.

Source: www.collegeinsider.com

== Bracket ==
Bracket is for visual purposes only. The CIT does not have a set bracket.

First round March 17–19
Quinnipiac	68
Yale	69
Holy Cross	68
Brown	65
Norfolk State	54
Eastern Michigan	58
Columbia	58
Valparaiso	56
Akron	91
IPFW	97
VMI	111
Canisius	100
Wright State	73
East Carolina	59
Cleveland State	62
Ohio	64
Portland State	65
San Diego	87
Alabama State	49
Sam Houston State	71
Texas A&M–CC	82
Northern Colorado	71
Pacific	69
Grand Canyon	67
Towson	63
USC Upstate	60
Chattanooga	66
East Tennessee State	79
North Dakota	75
Nebraska–Omaha	91
Murray State	66
Missouri State	63

Second round March 21–24
Yale	71
Holy Cross	66
Eastern Michigan	56
Columbia	69
IPFW	95
VMI	106
Wright State	54
Ohio	56
San Diego	77
Sam Houston State	72
Texas A&M–CC	60
Pacific	89
Towson	83
East Tennessee State	77
Nebraska–Omaha	62
Murray State	86

Quarterfinals; March 26–27
Yale	72
Columbia	69
VMI	92
Ohio	90
San Diego	60
Pacific	75
Towson	73
Murray State	85

Semifinals; April 1
Yale	75
VMI	62
Pacific	75
Murray State	98

Championship; April 3
Yale	57
Murray State	65

Home teams are listed second.
