= 2013–14 SMU Mustangs men's basketball team =

American college basketball season

2013–14 SMU Mustangs men's basketball

NIT Championship vs. Minnesota, L 63–65
- Conference: American Athletic Conference
- Record: 27–10 (12–6 The American)
- Head coach: Larry Brown (2nd season)
- Assistant coaches: Tim Jankovich; Ulric Maligi; K. T. Turner
- Home arena: Moody Coliseum

2013–14 American Athletic Conference men's basketball standings
	Conf.				Overall
Team	W		L	PCT	W		L	PCT
No. 5 Louisville* †	15	–	3	.833	31	–	6	.838
No. 15 Cincinnati	15	–	3	.833	27	–	7	.794
No. 18 UConn	12	–	6	.667	32	–	8	.800
SMU	12	–	6	.667	27	–	10	.730
Memphis	12	–	6	.667	24	–	10	.706
Houston	8	–	10	.444	17	–	16	.515
Rutgers	5	–	13	.278	12	–	21	.364
UCF	4	–	14	.222	13	–	18	.419
Temple	4	–	14	.222	9	–	22	.290
South Florida	3	–	15	.167	12	–	20	.375
† The American Tournament winner As of March 15, 2014; *Louisville: 29 reg. season games, 3 postseason games vacated due to sanctions against the program; Disputed Record-(31-6)(15-3); Rankings from AP poll

The 2013–14 SMU Mustangs men's basketball team represented Southern Methodist University (SMU) during the 2013–14 NCAA Division I men's basketball season. The Mustangs played home games on their campus in University Park, Texas at Moody Coliseum. The 2013–14 season was the first season the Mustangs participated in the American Athletic Conference. They finished the season 27–10, 12–6 in AAC play to finish in a three-way tie for third place. They lost in the quarterfinals of the AAC tournament to Houston. They were invited to the National Invitation Tournament where they defeated UC Irvine, LSU, California and Clemson to advance to the NIT championship game where they lost to Minnesota. The 2013–14 season marked the first time in 30 years the SMU Mustangs had been ranked in the AP Poll.

== Off-season ==
2013–2014 Season Highlight: https://www.youtube.com/watch?v=XLou7XIYqr4

=== Departures ===
Name	Number	Pos.	Height	Weight	Year	Hometown	Notes
London Giles	11	G	6'3"	185	Senior	Dallas, Texas	Graduation
Jordan Dickerson	32	C	7'0"	240	Freshman	Brooklyn, New York	Elected to transfer to Penn State.
Blaise Mbargorba	55	C	6'11"	210	Freshman	Hightstown, New Jersey	Elected to transfer to Boston University.
Uche Ofoegbu	5	F	6'4"	200	Freshman	San Antonio, Texas	Elected to transfer to San Francisco.
Brian Bernardi	22	G	6'2"	180	Freshman	New York City	Elected to transfer to Hofstra.
Garrett Wilson	24	G	6'0"	170	Freshman	Katy, Texas	No longer on official team roster.

=== 2013 recruiting class ===
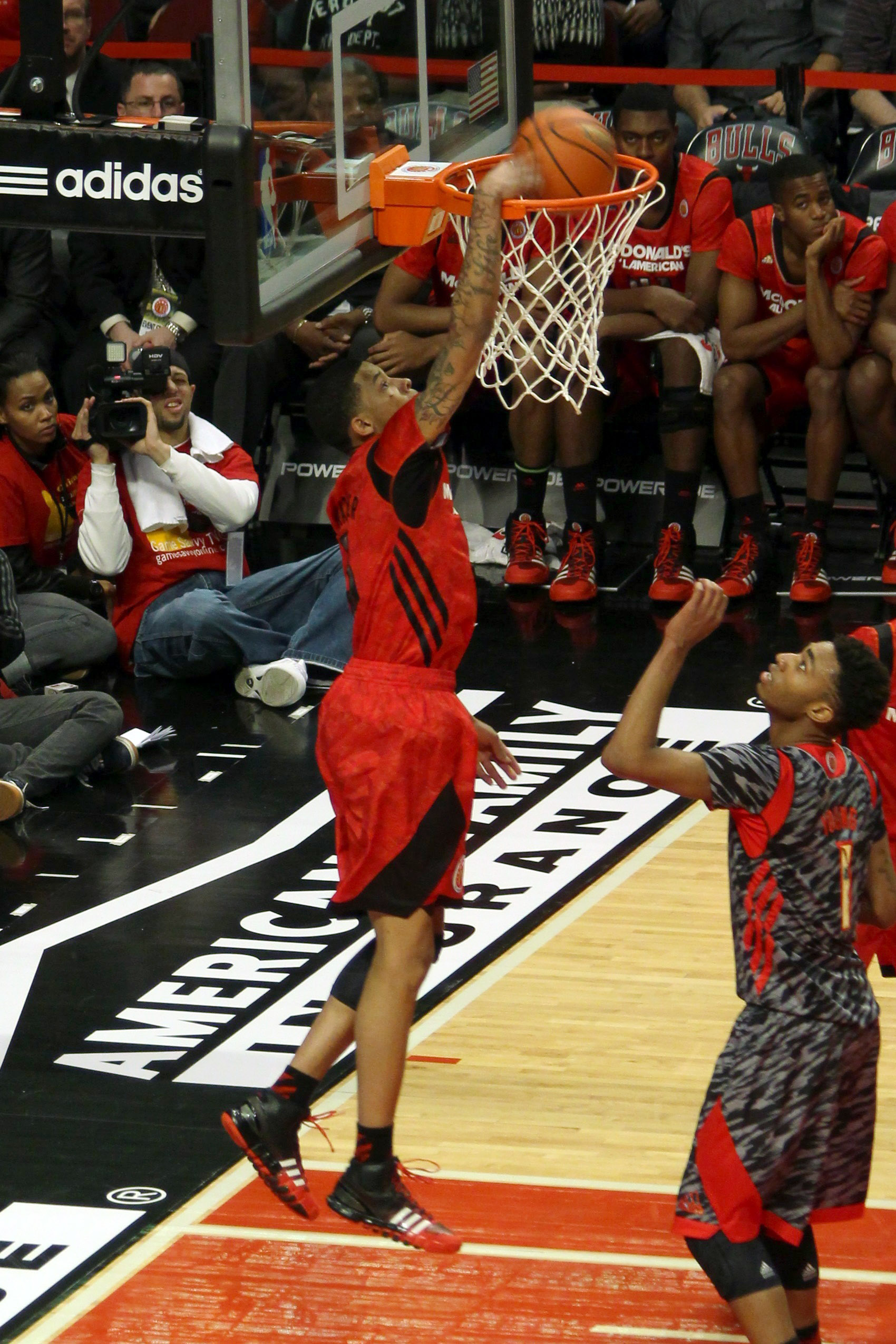
Keith Frazier in the 2013 McDonald's All-American Boys Game

College recruiting
Name	Hometown	School	Height	Weight	Commit date
Keith Frazier; G	Dallas, Texas	Justin F. Kimball High School	6 ft 5 in (1.96 m)	190 lb (86 kg)	Apr 2, 2013
Keith Frazier; G	Recruit ratings: Scout: Rivals: (88)				
Sterling Brown; G	Maywood, Illinois	Proviso East High School	6 ft 4 in (1.93 m)	180 lb (82 kg)	Oct 15, 2012
Sterling Brown; G	Recruit ratings: Scout: Rivals: (77)				
Ben Moore; F	Bolingbrook, Illinois	Bolingbrook High School	6 ft 7 in (2.01 m)	190 lb (86 kg)	Oct 16, 2012
Ben Moore; F	Recruit ratings: Scout: Rivals: (NR)				
Overall recruit ranking:
Note: In many cases, Scout, Rivals, 247Sports, On3, and ESPN may conflict in their listings of height and weight.; In these cases, the average was taken. ESPN grades are on a 100-point scale.; Sources: "2013 SMU Recruiting List". Rivals.; "2013 SMU Recruiting List". Scout.; "2013 SMU Recruiting List". ESPN.; "Scout.com Team Recruiting Rankings". Scout.; "2013 Team Ranking". Rivals.

== Roster ==
2013–14 SMU Mustangs men's basketball team
Players
Coaches

Pos.	#	Name	Height	Weight	Year	Previous school	Hometown
G	1	Ryan Manuel	6 ft 4 in (1.93 m)	185 lb (84 kg)	Jr	Fort Bend Austin HS	Houston, Texas
F	2	Shawn Williams	6 ft 7 in (2.01 m)	230 lb (104 kg)	RS Sr	Duncanville HS	Duncanville, Texas
G	3	Sterling Brown	6 ft 6 in (1.98 m)	200 lb (91 kg)	Fr	Proviso East HS	Maywood, Illinois
G	4	Keith Frazier	6 ft 5 in (1.96 m)	190 lb (86 kg)	Fr	Kimball HS	Dallas, Texas
F	5	Markus Kennedy	6 ft 9 in (2.06 m)	260 lb (118 kg)	RS So	Brewster Academy	Philadelphia
G	10	Kevin Dunleavy	6 ft 3 in (1.91 m)	180 lb (82 kg)	Jr	Delbarton School	New Providence, New Jersey
G	11	Nic Moore	5 ft 9 in (1.75 m)	170 lb (77 kg)	RS So	Warsaw Community HS	Winona Lake, Indiana
G	12	Nick Russell	6 ft 4 in (1.93 m)	210 lb (95 kg)	RS Sr	Grace Prep Academy	Duncanville, Texas
G	13	Crandall Head	6 ft 4 in (1.93 m)	180 lb (82 kg)	RS Jr	Rich South HS	Matteson, Illinois
C	15	Cannen Cunnigham	6 ft 10 in (2.08 m)	225 lb (102 kg)	Jr	Lamar HS	Arlington, Texas
G	21	Jalen Jones	6 ft 7 in (2.01 m)	220 lb (100 kg)	Jr	Kimball HS	Dallas, Texas
F	34	Ben Moore	6 ft 8 in (2.03 m)	185 lb (84 kg)	Fr	Bolingbrook HS	Bolingbrook, Illinois
C	35	Yanick Moreira	6 ft 11 in (2.11 m)	220 lb (100 kg)	Jr	South Plains College	Luanda, Angola

Head coach

- Larry Brown

Assistant coach(es)

- Tim Jankovich
- Ulric Maligi
- K. T. Turner

Legend

- (C) Team captain
- (S) Suspended
- (I) Ineligible
- (W) Walk-on
- Injured
- Current redshirt

Roster
Last update: August 20, 2013

== Schedule and results ==
Date time, TV	Rank^{#}	Opponent^{#}	Result	Record	Site (attendance) city, state
Regular season
November 8, 2013*; 6:30 pm, FSSW+		vs. TCU; Tip-Off Showcase	W 69–61	1–0	American Airlines Center (5,207); Dallas
November 11, 2013*; 7:00 pm, ESPN3		Rhode Island	W 89–58	2–0	Curtis Culwell Center (3,239); Garland, Texas
November 18, 2013*; 7:00 pm		at Arkansas	L 78–89	2–1	Bud Walton Arena (11,455); Fayetteville, Arkansas
November 20, 2013*; 7:30 pm, ESPN3		Texas State	W 70–49	3–1	Curtis Culwell Center (3,509); Garland, Texas
November 24, 2013*; 1:30 pm, ESPN3		Arkansas–Pine Bluff; Corpus Christi Challenge	W 87–61	4–1	Curtis Culwell Center (3,308); Garland, Texas
November 26, 2013*; 7:00 pm, ESPN3		Sam Houston State; Corpus Christi Challenge	W 72–53	5–1	Curtis Culwell Center (3,549); Garland, Texas
November 29, 2013*; 6:30 pm, CBSSN		vs. Virginia; Corpus Christi Challenge	L 73–76	5–2	American Bank Center (N/A); Corpus Christi, Texas
November 30, 2013*; 5:30 pm, CBSSN		vs. Texas A&M; Corpus Christi Challenge	W 55–52	6–2	American Bank Center (N/A); Corpus Christi, Texas
December 2, 2013*; 7:30 pm, ESPN3		McNeese State	W 88–59	7–2	Curtis Culwell Center (3,252); Garland, Texas
December 4, 2013*; 7:00 pm, ESPN3		at UIC	W 73–65	8–2	UIC Pavilion (4,438); Chicago, IL
December 18, 2013*; 7:30 pm, ESPN3		Texas–Pan American	W 82–56	9–2	Curtis Culwell Center (3,342); Garland, Texas
December 20, 2013*; 8:00 pm, RTRM		at Wyoming	W 62–54	10–2	Arena-Auditorium (4,486); Laramie, Wyoming
January 1, 2014; 6:00 pm, ESPNU		at Cincinnati	L 57–65	10–3 (0–1)	Fifth Third Arena (7,239); Cincinnati
January 4, 2014; 1:00 pm, ESPNU		No. 17 UConn	W 74–65	11–3 (1–1)	Moody Coliseum (7,166); Dallas
January 12, 2014; 1:00 pm, CBSSN		at No. 12 Louisville	L 63–71	11–4 (1–2)	KFC Yum! Center (21,237); Louisville, Kentucky
January 15, 2014; 6:00 pm, ESPNU		South Florida	W 71–54	12–4 (2–2)	Moody Coliseum (6,332); Dallas
January 18, 2014; 11:00 am, ESPNews		at UCF	W 58–46	13–4 (3–2)	CFE Arena (4,905); Orlando, Florida
January 19, 2014*; 12:00 pm, ESPN3		Hofstra; Postponed from December 7, 2013	W 73–49	14–4	Moody Coliseum (6,013); Dallas, TX
January 21, 2014; 7:00 pm, ESPNews		Rutgers	W 70–56	15–4 (4–2)	Moody Coliseum (6,042); Dallas
January 26, 2014; 2:00 pm, ESPNews		at Houston	W 75–68	16–4 (5–2)	Hofheinz Pavilion (4,567); Houston
January 28, 2014; 6:00 pm, ESPNews		at South Florida	L 71–78	16–5 (5–3)	USF Sun Dome (3,407); Tampa, Florida
February 1, 2014; 1:00 pm, CBSSN		No. 22 Memphis	W 87–72	17–5 (6–3)	Moody Coliseum (7,058); Dallas
February 6, 2014; 7:00 pm, ESPNews		Temple	W 75–52	18–5 (7–3)	Moody Coliseum (6,852); Dallas
February 8, 2014; 6:30 pm, ESPNU		No. 7 Cincinnati	W 76–55	19–5 (8–3)	Moody Coliseum (7,278); Dallas
February 13, 2014; 6:00 pm, ESPNU	No. 23	at Rutgers	W 77–65	20–5 (9–3)	The RAC (4,094); Piscataway, New Jersey
February 16, 2014; 1:00 pm, CBSSN	No. 23	at Temple	L 64–71	20–6 (9–4)	Liacouras Center (6,566); Philadelphia
February 19, 2014; 7:00 pm, ESPNews		Houston	W 68–64	21–6 (10–4)	Moody Coliseum (6,991); Dallas
February 23, 2014; 1:00 pm, CBSSN		at No. 21 UConn	W 64–55	22–6 (11–4)	Gampel Pavilion (10,167); Storrs, Connecticut
March 1, 2014; 3:00 pm, ESPNews	No. 23	UCF	W 70–55	23–6 (12–4)	Moody Coliseum (7,086); Dallas
March 5, 2014; 6:00 pm, CBSSN	No. 18	No. 11 Louisville	L 71–84	23–7 (12–5)	Moody Coliseum (7,305); Dallas
March 8, 2014; 11:00 am, ESPN2	No. 18	at No. 20 Memphis	L 58–67	23–8 (12–6)	FedEx Forum (18,182); Memphis, Tennessee
American Athletic Conference tournament
March 13, 2014; 12:00 pm, ESPNU	No. 25	vs. Houston; Quarterfinals	L 64–68	23–9	FedEx Forum (13,011); Memphis, Tennessee
NIT
March 19, 2014*; 8:00 pm, ESPN2	No. (1)	(8) UC Irvine; First round	W 68–54	24–9	Moody Coliseum (5,031); Dallas
March 24, 2014*; 8:00 pm, ESPN	No. (1)	(5) LSU; Second round	W 80–67	25–9	Moody Coliseum (7,021); Dallas
March 26, 2014*; 8:00 pm, ESPN2	No. (1)	(2) California; Quarterfinals	W 67–65	26–9	Moody Coliseum (7,038); Dallas
April 1, 2014*; 6:00 pm, ESPN2	No. (1)	vs. (3) Clemson; Semifinals	W 65–59	27–9	Madison Square Garden (7,193); New York City
April 3, 2014*; 6:00 pm, ESPN2	No. (1)	vs. (1) Minnesota; Championship	L 63–65	27–10	Madison Square Garden (5,268); New York City
*Non-conference game. ^{#}Rankings from AP Poll, (#) during NIT is seed within region. (#) Tournament seedings in parentheses. All times are in Central Time.

== Rankings ==
Ranking movement Legend: ██ Improvement in ranking. ██ Decrease in ranking. RV=Others receiving votes.
Poll	Pre	Wk 2	Wk 3	Wk 4	Wk 5	Wk 6	Wk 7	Wk 8	Wk 9	Wk 10	Wk 11	Wk 12	Wk 13	Wk 14	Wk 15	Wk 16	Wk 17	Wk 18	Wk 19	Wk 20	Final
AP	NR	NR	NR	NR	NR	NR	NR	RV	NR	RV	NR	RV	RV	RV	23	RV	23	18	25	NR	N/A
Coaches	NR	NR	NR	NR	NR	NR	NR	NR	NR	NR	NR	NR	RV	RV	RV	RV	24	18	23	RV	RV
