= 2013–14 Akron Zips men's basketball team =

American college basketball season

2013–14 Akron Zips men's basketball
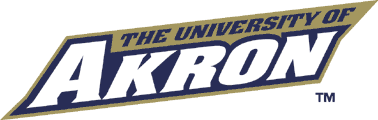

CIT, First round
- Conference: Mid-American Conference
- East Division
- Record: 21–13 (12–6 MAC)
- Head coach: Keith Dambrot (10th season)
- Assistant coaches: Rick McFadden; Charles Thomas; Terry Weigand
- Home arena: James A. Rhodes Arena

2013–14 Mid-American Conference men's basketball standings
	Conf.				Overall
Team	W		L	PCT	W		L	PCT
East
Buffalo	13	–	5	.722	19	–	10	.655
Akron	12	–	6	.667	21	–	13	.618
Ohio	11	–	7	.611	25	–	12	.676
Miami	8	–	10	.444	13	–	18	.419
Kent State	7	–	11	.389	16	–	16	.500
Bowling Green	6	–	12	.333	12	–	20	.375
West
Toledo	14	–	4	.778	27	–	7	.794
Western Michigan †	14	–	4	.778	23	–	10	.697
Eastern Michigan	10	–	8	.556	22	–	15	.595
Northern Illinois	8	–	10	.444	15	–	17	.469
Central Michigan	3	–	15	.167	10	–	21	.323
Ball State	2	–	16	.111	5	–	25	.167
† 2014 MAC tournament winner

The 2013–14 Akron Zips men's basketball team represented the University of Akron during the 2013–14 NCAA Division I men's basketball season. The Zips, led by tenth year head coach Keith Dambrot, played their home games at the James A. Rhodes Arena as members of the East Division of the Mid-American Conference. They finished the season 21–13, 12–6 in MAC play to finish in second place in the East Division. They advanced to the semifinals of the MAC tournament where they lost to Western Michigan. They were invited to the CollegeInsider.com Tournament where they lost in the first round to IPFW.

== Season ==
=== Preseason ===
Akron announced their complete season schedule on September 2, 2013. On the non-conference schedule, the Zips announced they would compete in the annual Diamond Head Classic in Honolulu, Hawaii. Other key non-conference games included a trip to Saint Mary's during the ESPN Tip-Off Marathon, as well as a road game against South Carolina. For the conference schedule, Akron scheduled home-and-home series with Ball State, Eastern Michigan, Ohio, Miami, Kent State, Bowling Green, and Buffalo. Northern Illinois, Toledo, Western Michigan, and Central Michigan were to be played once each.

Akron opened their preseason with an exhibition victory against Bluffton on November 1. Senior Nick Harney scored 21 points to lead the Zips in a 95–40 rout.

=== November ===
The Zips hosted Coastal Carolina on November 8 in their season and home opener. Led by Demetrius Treadwell, who had 13 points and eight rebounds, the Zips held an 11-point lead at halftime and finished off a 72–63 victory, their first of the season. Akron then traveled to Moraga, California to take on traditional mid-major power Saint Mary's as part of the ESPN Hoops Tip-Off Marathon on November 12. The Zips kept it close early behind the play of Treadwell, and despite a strong advantage in rebounding, Akron's poor shooting couldn't lead them to victory, falling 63–85.

On November 16, the Zips traveled to Murfreesboro, Tennessee to take on 2013 NCAA tournament participant Middle Tennessee. After being tied at halftime, Akron stayed with three points until the Blue Raiders pulled ahead by five with 7:10 remaining, eventually winning 80–73. The win extended the Blue Raiders' home winning streak to 32 games.

=== December ===
Following a three-week layoff without playing a game, the Zips returned to action on December 6 when they visited Cleveland State. Cleveland State lost the lead eight minutes into the first half, and Akron, led by Nick Harney, who scored 15 points, pulled out a 73–61 victory. One week later, the Zips hosted MEAC foe Bethune-Cookman. Akron held control of the game and never let go, and capped the first half with 37–6 run. Treadwell scored 19 points and shot a perfect 7–7 from the field to lead the team to an 84–56 win, their second straight.

On December 16, the Zips played host to the Golden Eagles of Oral Roberts University. Tied midway in the second half at 52, Reggie McAdams drained two 3-pointers that gave Akron a lead they would not relinquish en route to a 74–64 triumph.

== Roster ==
2013–14 Akron Zips men's basketball team
Players
Coaches

Pos.	#	Name	Height	Weight	Year	Previous school	Hometown
F	1	Demetrius Treadwell	6 ft 7 in (2.01 m)	235 lb (107 kg)	Sr	Euclid HS	Euclid, OH
F	2	Kwan Cheatham	6 ft 9 in (2.06 m)	233 lb (106 kg)	Fr	Winton Woods HS	Cincinnati, OH
G	3	Nyles Evans	5 ft 11 in (1.8 m)	170 lb (77 kg)	Jr	Hoover HS; Brevard CC	North Canton, OH
G	4	Deji Ibitayo	6 ft 4 in (1.93 m)	205 lb (93 kg)	Jr	Rich Central HS	Chicago, IL
F	5	B. J. Gladden	6 ft 6 in (1.98 m)	215 lb (98 kg)	Fr	Olympic HS	Charlotte, NC
F	10	Nick Harney	6 ft 8 in (2.03 m)	210 lb (95 kg)	Sr	Benedictine HS	Cleveland, OH
G	11	Aaron Jackson	6 ft 7 in (2.01 m)	193 lb (88 kg)	Fr	Lincoln HS	Gahanna, OH
G	12	Carmelo Betancourt	5 ft 11 in (1.8 m)	182 lb (83 kg)	So	Montrose Christian School; Colegio Adianez	Río Piedras, P.R.
F	13	Quincy Diggs	6 ft 6 in (1.98 m)	209 lb (95 kg)	Sr	Plano East HS; New Orleans	Dallas, TX
F	15	Jake Kretzer	6 ft 6 in (1.98 m)	215 lb (98 kg)	So	Waverly HS	Waverly, OH
F	21	Reggie McAdams	6 ft 7 in (2.01 m)	210 lb (95 kg)	So	Elida HS	Elida, OH
C	23	Isaiah Johnson	6 ft 10 in (2.08 m)	285 lb (129 kg)	Fr	Walnut Hills HS	Cincinnati, OH
G	30	Darius Hoisten	6 ft 5 in (1.96 m)	180 lb (82 kg)	So	Garfield HS	Akron, OH
F	33	Jonas Stalyga	6 ft 8 in (2.03 m)	220 lb (100 kg)	Jr	Grand Island High School; Loyola (IL)	Vilnius, Lithuania
C	34	Pat Forsythe	6 ft 11 in (2.11 m)	235 lb (107 kg)	So	Brunswick HS; West Virginia	Brunswick, OH

Head coach

- Keith Dambrot (Akron)

Assistant coach(es)

- Rick McFadden (Akron)
- Charles Thomas (Eastern Michigan)
- Terry Weigand (Ashland)

Legend

- (C) Team captain
- (S) Suspended
- (I) Ineligible
- (W) Walk-on
- Injured
- Current redshirt

== Schedule and results ==
Date time, TV	Opponent	Result	Record	Site (attendance) city, state
Exhibition
11/1/2013*; 7:00 pm	Bluffton	W 95–40	–	James A. Rhodes Arena (3,286); Akron, OH
Non-conference games
11/8/2013*; 8:00 pm	Coastal Carolina	W 72–63	1–0	James A. Rhodes Arena (4,217); Akron, OH
11/12/2013*; 3:00 am, ESPN2	at Saint Mary's; ESPN Tip-Off Marathon	L 63–85	1–1	McKeon Pavilion (2,245); Moraga, CA
11/16/2013*; 3:00 pm	at Middle Tennessee	L 73–80	1–2	Murphy Center (4,288); Murfreesboro, TN
12/7/2013*; 2:00 pm	at Cleveland State	W 73–61	2–2	Wolstein Center (3,079); Cleveland, OH
12/14/2013*; 7:00 pm	Bethune-Cookman	W 84–56	3–2	James A. Rhodes Arena (2,763); Akron, OH
12/16/2013*; 7:00 pm	Oral Roberts	W 74–64	4–2	James A. Rhodes Arena (2,668); Akron, OH
12/18/2013*; 7:00 pm	Detroit	W 79–60	5–2	James A. Rhodes Arena (2,800); Akron, OH
12/22/2013*; 7:30 pm, ESPNU	vs. Oregon State; Diamond Head Classic First Round	W 83–71	6–2	Stan Sheriff Center (8,694); Honolulu, HI
12/23/2013*; 4:30 pm, ESPNU	vs. No. 14 Iowa State; Diamond Head Classic Semifinals	L 60–83	6–3	Stan Sheriff Center (7,140); Honolulu, HI
12/25/2013*; 6:30 pm, ESPN2	vs. South Carolina; Diamond Head Classic 3rd place game	L 59–69	6–4	Stan Sheriff Center (6,769); Honolulu, HI
12/28/2013*; 4:00 pm, ESPNU	at South Carolina; Diamond Head Classic	L 45–78	6–5	Colonial Life Arena (7,802); Columbia, SC
12/31/2013*; 6:00 pm	Coppin State	W 77–66	7–5	James A. Rhodes Arena (2,701); Akron, OH
1/2/2014*; 7:00 pm	Marshall	W 59–58	8–5	James A. Rhodes Arena (3,784); Akron, OH
Conference games
1/8/2014; 7:00 pm	at Ball State	W 72–68	9–5 (1–0)	John E. Worthen Arena (2,606); Muncie, IN
1/12/2014; 6:00 pm, ESPN3	at Ohio	W 83–80 ^{2OT}	10–5 (2–0)	Convocation Center (8,114); Athens, OH
1/15/2014; 7:00 pm	Miami (OH)	W 59–52	11–5 (3–0)	James A. Rhodes Arena (3,058); Akron, OH
1/18/2014; 11:00 am	Toledo	L 61–75	11–6 (3–1)	James A. Rhodes Arena (4,596); Akron, OH
1/22/2014; 7:00 pm, ESPN3	at Eastern Michigan	W 78–68	12–6 (4–1)	Convocation Center (609); Ypsilanti, MI
1/25/2014; 7:00 pm	at Central Michigan	W 82–74	13–6 (5–1)	McGuirk Arena (2,039); Mount Pleasant, MI
1/29/2014; 7:00 pm	Ball State	W 73–46	14–6 (6–1)	James A. Rhodes Arena (3,211); Akron, OH
2/1/2014; 6:00 pm	Kent State; ESPN3	L 57–60	14–7 (6–2)	MAC Center (6,181); Kent, OH
2/5/2014; 7:00 pm, ESPN3	Eastern Michigan	W 52–48	15–7 (7–2)	James A. Rhodes Arena (3,014); Akron, OH
2/9/2014; 6:00 pm, ESPN3	at Bowling Green	W 65–63	16–7 (8–2)	Stroh Center (2,901); Bowling Green, OH
2/12/2014; 7:00 pm	at Western Michigan	L 54–57	16–8 (8–3)	University Arena (2,369); Kalamazoo, MI
2/15/2014; 7:00 pm	Northern Illinois	W 62–54	17–8 (9–3)	James A. Rhodes Arena (3,642); Akron, OH
2/19/2014; 7:00 pm, ESPN3	at Buffalo	L 90–96	17–9 (9–4)	Alumni Arena (3,579); Amherst, NY
2/22/2014; 6:00 pm, ESPN3	Ohio	L 50–66	17–10 (9–5)	James A. Rhodes Arena (4,918); Akron, OH
2/26/2014; 7:00 pm	at Miami (OH)	L 61–65	17–11 (9–6)	Millett Hall (1,004); Oxford, OH
3/1/2014; 7:00 pm	Bowling Green	W 57–47	18–11 (10–6)	James A. Rhodes Arena (4,049); Akron, OH
3/4/2014; 7:00 pm	Buffalo	W 83–71	19–11 (11–6)	James A. Rhodes Arena (3,220); Akron, OH
3/8/2014; TBD	Kent State	W 58–54	20–11 (12–6)	James A. Rhodes Arena (5,488); Akron, OH
MAC tournament
03/13/2014; 6:30 pm, TWCSC (Ohio)	vs. Ohio; Quarterfinals	W 83–77	21–11	Quicken Loans Arena (4,116); Cleveland, OH
03/14/2014; 6:30 pm, TWCSC (Ohio)	vs. Western Michigan; Semifinals	L 60–64 ^{OT}	21–12	Quicken Loans Arena (6,318); Cleveland, OH
CIT
03/19/2014*; 7:00 pm	at IPFW; First round	L 91–97	21–13	Gates Sports Center (1,283); Fort Wayne, IN
*Non-conference game. ^{#}Rankings from AP Poll. (#) Tournament seedings in parentheses. All times are in Eastern.
