= 2013–14 Valparaiso Crusaders men's basketball team =

American college basketball season

2013–14 Valparaiso Crusaders men's basketball

CIT, First round
- Conference: Horizon League
- Record: 18–16 (9–7 Horizon)
- Head coach: Bryce Drew
- Assistant coaches: Roger Powell; Luke Gore; Matt Lottich
- Home arena: Athletics–Recreation Center

2013–14 Horizon League men's basketball standings
| | Conf. | | | | Overall |
| Team | W | | L | PCT | W | | L | PCT |
|---|---|---|---|---|---|---|---|---|
| Green Bay | 14 | – | 2 | .875 | 24 | – | 7 | .774 |
| Cleveland State | 12 | – | 4 | .750 | 21 | – | 12 | .636 |
| Wright State | 10 | – | 6 | .625 | 21 | – | 15 | .583 |
| Valparaiso | 9 | – | 7 | .563 | 18 | – | 16 | .529 |
| Milwaukee † | 7 | – | 9 | .438 | 21 | – | 14 | .600 |
| Oakland | 7 | – | 9 | .438 | 13 | – | 20 | .394 |
| Youngstown State | 6 | – | 10 | .375 | 15 | – | 17 | .469 |
| Detroit | 6 | – | 10 | .375 | 13 | – | 19 | .406 |
| UIC | 1 | – | 15 | .063 | 6 | – | 25 | .194 |
† 2014 Horizon League Tournament winner

The 2013–14 Valparaiso Crusaders men's basketball team represented Valparaiso University during the 2013–14 NCAA Division I men's basketball season. The Crusaders, led by third year head coach Bryce Drew, played their home games at the Athletics–Recreation Center and were members of the Horizon League. They finished the season 18–16, 9–7 in Horizon League play to finish in fourth place. They advanced to the second round of the Horizon League tournament where they lost to Milwaukee. They were invited to the CollegeInsider.com Tournament where they lost in the first round to Columbia.

== Roster ==
2013–14 Valparaiso Crusaders men's basketball team
Players
Coaches

| Pos. | # | Name | Height | Weight | Year | Hometown |
|---|---|---|---|---|---|---|
| G | 0 | Keith Carter | 6 ft 0 in (1.83 m) | 185 lb (84 kg) | So | Maywood, IL |
| G | 2 | Jordan Coleman | 6 ft 5 in (1.96 m) | 190 lb (86 kg) | Sr | North Hollywood, CA |
| G | 4 | LaVonte Dority | 6 ft 1 in (1.85 m) | 200 lb (91 kg) | Sr | Chicago, IL |
| F | 5 | Bobby Capobianco | 6 ft 10 in (2.08 m) | 235 lb (107 kg) | RS Sr | Loveland, OH |
| C | 10 | Moussa Gueye | 7 ft 0 in (2.13 m) | 270 lb (122 kg) | RS Sr | Thiès, SEN |
| G/F | 11 | Clay Yeo | 6 ft 4 in (1.93 m) | 180 lb (82 kg) | Fr | Bourbon, IN |
| F | 14 | Vashil Fernandez | 6 ft 10 in (2.08 m) | 245 lb (111 kg) | Jr | Kingston, JM |
| G | 15 | Lexus Williams | 5 ft 11 in (1.8 m) | 155 lb (70 kg) | Fr | Chicago, IL |
| G | 22 | Nick Davidson | 6 ft 3 in (1.91 m) | 200 lb (91 kg) | Fr | Merrillville, IN |
| F | 23 | Jubril Adekoya | 6 ft 7 in (2.01 m) | 225 lb (102 kg) | Fr | Tinley Park, IL |
| F | 25 | Alec Peters | 6 ft 8 in (2.03 m) | 225 lb (102 kg) | Fr | Washington, IL |
| F | 32 | David Chadwick | 6 ft 9 in (2.06 m) | 220 lb (100 kg) | Sr | Charlotte, NC |
| G/F | | E. Victor Nickerson | 6 ft 7 in (2.01 m) | 195 lb (88 kg) | Jr | Atlanta, GA |

Head coach

- Bryce Drew (Valparaiso)

Assistant coach(es)

- Roger Powell, Jr. (Illinois)
- Luke Gore (Bethel (TN))
- Matt Lottich (Stanford)

Legend

- (C) Team captain
- (S) Suspended
- (I) Ineligible
- (W) Walk-on
- Injured
- Current redshirt

Roster
Last update: 2013-11-07

== Schedule ==
| Date time, TV | Opponent | Result | Record | Site (attendance) city, state |
Regular season
| 11/08/2013*; 7:30 pm | Murray State | W 77–74 | 1–0 | Athletics–Recreation Center (4,277); Valparaiso, IN |
| 11/10/2013*; 1:35 pm | North Park | W 113–50 | 2–0 | Athletics–Recreation Center (N/A); Valparaiso, IN |
| 11/13/2013*; 6:30 pm, BTN | at Illinois | L 52–64 | 2–1 | State Farm Center (13,504); Champaign, IL |
| 11/17/2013*; 1:00 pm | at Ohio | L 72–76 | 2–2 | Convocation Center (6,144); Athens, OH |
| 11/20/2013*; 8:00 pm | at Evansville | L 92–100 | 2–3 | Ford Center (4,018); Evansville, IN |
| 11/23/2013*; 2:05 pm | James Madison | W 81–49 | 3–3 | Athletics–Recreation Center (2,453); Valparaiso, IN |
| 11/26/2013*; 7:05 pm | UCF | W 85–70 | 4–3 | Athletics–Recreation Center (2,381); Valparaiso, IN |
| 11/29/2013*; 7:05 pm | Mercer | L 108–117 ^{3OT} | 4–4 | Athletics–Recreation Center (2,574); Valparaiso, IN |
| 11/30/2013*; 7:05 pm | Cincinnati Christian | W 94–58 | 5–4 | Athletics–Recreation Center (1,965); Valparaiso, IN |
| 12/04/2013*; 6:00 pm | at Ball State | W 69–50 | 6–4 | John E. Worthen Arena (2,953); Muncie, IN |
| 12/07/2013*; 7:00 pm | Saint Louis | L 65–67 | 6–5 | Athletics–Recreation Center (3,564); Valparaiso, IN |
| 12/14/2013*; 1:05 pm | Loyola Marymount | W 80–73 | 7–5 | Athletics–Recreation Center (2,548); Valparaiso, IN |
| 12/21/2013*; 5:30 pm | vs. Southeastern (FL); UCF Holiday Classic | W 89–46 | 8–5 | CFE Arena (364); Orlando, FL |
| 12/22/2013*; 1:30 pm | at UCF; UCF Holiday Classic | L 62–90 | 8–6 | CFE Arena (4,345); Orlando, FL |
| 12/29/2013*; 3:00 pm | at East Tennessee State | L 62–73 | 8–7 | ETSU/Mountain States Health Alliance Athletic Center (2,462); Johnson City, TN |
| 1/02/2014; 7:05 pm | UIC | W 87–72 | 9–7 (1–0) | Athletics–Recreation Center (2,775); Valparaiso, IN |
| 1/04/2014; 5:00 pm | at Oakland | L 70–75 | 9–8 (1–1) | Athletics Center O'rena (2,709); Rochester, MI |
| 1/10/2014; 8:00 pm | Wright State | L 45–62 | 9–9 (1–2) | Athletics–Recreation Center (4,117); Valparaiso, IN |
| 1/15/2014; 6:00 pm | at Detroit | W 78–70 | 10–9 (2–2) | Calihan Hall (1,602); Detroit, MI |
| 1/18/2014; 1:00 pm | Milwaukee | W 75–62 | 11–9 (3–2) | Athletics–Recreation Center (3,281); Valparaiso, IN |
| 1/23/2014; 6:05 pm | at Youngstown State | W 74–71 | 12–9 (4–2) | Beeghly Center (1,938); Youngstown, OH |
| 1/25/2014; 1:00 pm | at Cleveland State | L 50–69 | 12–10 (4–3) | Wolstein Center (2,331); Cleveland, OH |
| 1/29/2014; 7:05 pm | Green Bay | W 75–60 | 13–10 (5–3) | Athletics–Recreation Center (3,524); Valparaiso, IN |
| 2/01/2014; 3:00 pm | at UIC | W 70–46 | 14–10 (6–3) | UIC Pavilion (3,197); Chicago, IL |
| 2/07/2014; 8:00 pm | Detroit | L 57–59 | 14–11 (6–4) | Athletics–Recreation Center (3,661); Valparaiso, IN |
| 2/09/2014; 1:35 pm | Oakland | W 63–60 | 15–11 (7–4) | Athletics–Recreation Center (2,448); Valparaiso, IN |
| 2/15/2014; 7:00 pm | at Milwaukee | W 77–62 | 16–11 (8–4) | U.S. Cellular Arena (5,815); Milwaukee, WI |
| 2/20/2014; 7:00 pm | at Green Bay | L 53–67 | 16–12 (8–5) | Resch Center (3,564); Green Bay, WI |
| 2/22/2014; 7:05 pm | Youngstown State | W 68–66 | 17–12 (9–5) | Athletics–Recreation Center (3,657); Valparaiso, IN |
| 2/25/2014; 6:00 pm | at Wright State | L 58–67 | 17–13 (9–6) | Nutter Center (4,081); Fairborn, OH |
| 3/01/2014; 3:00 pm | Cleveland State | L 52–63 | 17–14 (9–7) | Athletics–Recreation Center (3,171); Valparaiso, IN |
Horizon League tournament
| 3/04/2014; 7:00 pm | UIC; First round | W 73–63 | 18–14 | Athletics–Recreation Center (1,099); Valparaiso, IN |
| 3/07/2014; 8:30 pm | vs. Milwaukee; Second round | L 57–74 | 18–15 | Resch Center (1,770); Green Bay, WI |
CIT
| 3/18/2014*; 7:05 pm | Columbia; First round | L 56–58 | 18–16 | Athletics–Recreation Center (1,663); Valparaiso, IN |
*Non-conference game. ^{#}Rankings from AP Poll. (#) Tournament seedings in parentheses. All times are in Central Time.
