= 2013–14 Wright State Raiders men's basketball team =

American college basketball season

2013–14 Wright State Raiders men's basketball

CIT, Second round
- Conference: Horizon League
- Record: 21–15 (10–6 Horizon)
- Head coach: Billy Donlon (4th season)
- Assistant coaches: Chris Moore; Scott Woods; Brandon Mullins
- Home arena: Nutter Center

2013–14 Horizon League men's basketball standings
	Conf.				Overall
Team	W		L	PCT	W		L	PCT
Green Bay	14	–	2	.875	24	–	7	.774
Cleveland State	12	–	4	.750	21	–	12	.636
Wright State	10	–	6	.625	21	–	15	.583
Valparaiso	9	–	7	.563	18	–	16	.529
Milwaukee †	7	–	9	.438	21	–	14	.600
Oakland	7	–	9	.438	13	–	20	.394
Youngstown State	6	–	10	.375	15	–	17	.469
Detroit	6	–	10	.375	13	–	19	.406
UIC	1	–	15	.063	6	–	25	.194
† 2014 Horizon League Tournament winner

The 2013–14 Wright State Raiders men's basketball team represented Wright State University during the 2013–14 NCAA Division I men's basketball season. The Raiders, led by fourth year head coach Billy Donlon, played their home games at the Nutter Center and were members of the Horizon League. They finished the season 21–15, 10–6 in Horizon League play to finish in third place. They advanced to the championship game of the Horizon League tournament where they lost to Milwaukee. They were invited to the 2014 CollegeInsider.com Tournament where they defeated East Carolina in the first round before losing in the second round to Ohio.

== Roster ==
Number	Name	Position	Height	Weight	Year	Hometown
0	Steven Davis	Forward	6–7	190	Freshman	Indianapolis, Indiana
2	Daniel Collie	Guard	5–11	175	Sophomore	Parkersburg, West Virginia
3	Reggie Arceneaux	Guard	5–9	160	Junior	New Orleans, Louisiana
4	Jerran Young	Forward	6–6	190	Senior	Cedar Hill, Texas
5	Miles Dixon	Guard	6–1	180	Senior	Missouri City, Texas
10	Mark Howell	Guard	5–10	170	Freshman	Grand Prairie, Texas
11	JT Yoho	Forward	6–6	220	Sophomore	Solsberry, Indiana
15	Kendall Griffin	Guard	6–4	210	Junior	Avon, Indiana
20	Chrishawn Hopkins	Guard	6–1	170	Junior	Indianapolis, Indiana
22	Cole Darling	Forward	6–8	200	Senior	Holt, Michigan
23	AJ Pacher	Forward	6–10	245	Senior	Vandalia, Ohio
24	Matt Vest	Guard	6–5	200	Senior	Kettering, Ohio
32	Daniel Meyer (redshirt)	Forward	6–9	225	Freshman	Billings, Montana
34	Stephen Gossard	Forward	6–6	205	Junior	Waynesville, Ohio
44	Tavares Sledge	Forward	6–9	225	Junior	Mobile, Alabama

== Schedule ==
Date time, TV	Opponent	Result	Record	Site (attendance) city, state
Regular season
11/10/2013*; 5:00 pm	Mount St. Joseph	W 82–49	1–0	Nutter Center (3,393); Fairborn, OH
11/13/2013*; 7:00 pm, FS1	at Georgetown	L 70–88	1–1	Verizon Center (7,350); Washington, D.C.
11/16/2013*; 2:00 pm	at DePaul; CBE Hall of Fame Classic	L 72–81	1–2	Allstate Arena (6,162); Rosemont, IL
11/18/2013*; 7:00 pm	Manchester (IN); CBE Hall of Fame Classic	W 83–33	2–2	Nutter Center (3,486); Fairborn, OH
11/22/2013*; 5:00 pm	vs. Houston Baptist; CBE Hall of Fame Classic	W 75–59	3–2	Mitchell Center (1,572); Mobile, AL
11/23/2013*; 2:00 pm	at South Alabama; CBE Hall of Fame Classic	L 70–74	3–3	Mitchell Center (1,614); Mobile, AL
11/27/2013*; 7:00 pm	Alcorn State	W 73–55	4–3	Nutter Center (3,211); Fairborn, OH
11/30/2013*; 3:00 pm	Western Carolina	W 85–77	5–3	Nutter Center (3,008); Fairborn, OH
12/02/2013*; 7:00 pm	at Morehead State	L 69–74	5–4	Ellis Johnson Arena (2,052); Morehead, KY
12/05/2013*; 7:00 pm	at North Carolina A&T	L 59–62	5–5	Corbett Sports Center (1,859); Greensboro, NC
12/07/2013*; 1:00 pm	at VMI	L 74–94	5–6	Cameron Hall (2,430); Lexington, VA
12/15/2013*; 2:00 pm	at Miami (OH)	L 56–59	5–7	Millett Hall (1,338); Oxford, OH
12/19/2013*; 7:00 pm	Eastern Illinois	W 70–43	6–7	Nutter Center (2,911); Fairborn, OH
12/21/2013*; 7:00 pm, Dayton CW	UMKC	W 61–49	7–7	Nutter Center (3,191); Fairborn, OH
12/29/2013*; 3:00 pm, Dayton CW	Bowling Green	W 46–43	8–7	Nutter Center (3,864); Fairborn, OH
1/02/2014; 7:00 pm	Oakland	W 76–64	9–7 (1–0)	Nutter Center (3,542); Fairborn, OH
1/04/2014; 2:00 pm	at Detroit	L 53–58	9–8 (1–1)	Calihan Hall (2,735); Detroit, MI
1/10/2014; 9:00 pm, ESPNU	at Valparaiso	W 62–45	10–8 (2–1)	Athletics-Recreation Center (4,117); Valparaiso, IN
1/12/2014; 7:00 pm, ESPN3	UIC	W 58–53	11–8 (3–1)	Nutter Center (3,008); Fairborn, OH
1/17/2014; 7:00 pm, ESPNU	Green Bay	L ^{69–79}	11–9 (3–2)	Nutter Center (6,600); Fairborn, OH
1/19/2014; 1:00 pm	at Cleveland State	W 49–46	12–9 (4–2)	Wolstein Center (2,023); Cleveland, OH
1/21/2014; 7:00 pm	Milwaukee	W 73–57	13–9 (5–2)	Nutter Center (3,274); Fairborn, OH
1/25/2014; 7:05 pm	at Youngstown State	L 67–68	13–10 (5–3)	Beeghly Center (4,743); Youngstown, OH
1/30/2014; 8:00 pm	at Milwaukee	L 64–68	13–11 (5–4)	Klotsche Center (2,129); Milwaukee, WI
2/01/2014; 6:00 pm, ESPN2	at Green Bay	L 55–62	13–12 (5–5)	Resch Center (5,098); Ashwaubenon, WI
2/05/2014; 7:00 pm, ESPN3	Youngstown State	W 77–67	14–12 (6–5)	Nutter Center (3,713); Fairborn, OH
2/08/2014; 1:00 pm, ESPN2	Cleveland State	L 68–72	14–13 (6–6)	Nutter Center (4,981); Fairborn, OH
2/16/2014; 1:00 pm	at Oakland	W 72–71	15–13 (7–6)	Athletics Center O'Rena (2,411); Rochester, MI
2/21/2014; 7:00 pm, ESPNU	Detroit	W 65–61	16–13 (8–6)	Nutter Center (5,042); Fairborn, OH
2/25/2014; 7:00 pm, ESPN3	Valparaiso	W 67–58	17–13 (9–6)	Nutter Center (4,081); Fairborn, OH
3/01/2014; 2:00 pm	at UIC	W 68–61	18–13 (10–6)	UIC Pavilion (4,362); Chicago, IL
Horizon League tournament
3/07/2014; 7:00 pm	vs. Oakland; Second round	W 73–57	19–13	Resch Center (1,770); Ashwaubenon, WI
3/08/2014; 7:00 pm, ESPNU	vs. Cleveland State; Semifinals	W 68–63	20–13	Resch Center (7,113); Ashwaubenon, WI
3/11/2014; 7:00 pm, ESPN	Milwaukee; Championship	L 63–69	20–14	Nutter Center (7,784); Fairborn, OH
CIT
3/18/2014*; 7:00 pm	at East Carolina; First round	W 73–59	21–14	Williams Arena (2,171); Greenville, NC
3/22/2014*; 2:00 pm	at Ohio; Second round	L 54–56	21–15	Convocation Center (3,533); Athens, OH
*Non-conference game. ^{#}Rankings from AP Poll. (#) Tournament seedings in parentheses. All times are in Eastern Time.

== Awards and honors ==
AJ Pacher	MVP
Matt Vest	Raider Award
AJ Pacher	Second Team All Horizon League
Matt Vest	Horizon League All Defensive Team
Miles Dixon	Horizon League All Tournament Team
AJ Pacher	Horizon League All Tournament Team

== Statistics ==
Number	Name	Games	Average	Points	Assists	Rebounds
23	AJ Pacher	36	11.4	410	30	177
5	Miles Dixon	35	8.5	297	72	82
4	Jerran Young	35	7.9	278	45	125
22	Cole Darling	32	8.5	271	19	106
11	JT Yoho	33	7.9	260	46	101
24	Matt Vest	34	7.5	254	74	101
3	Reggie Arceneaux	35	7.1	247	76	58
20	Chrishawn Hopkins	25	5.3	132	52	48
15	Kendall Griffin	23	5.1	118	48	63
00	Stephen Davis	22	2.7	60	12	32
44	Tavares Sledge	21	2.6	55	5	71
10	Mark Howell	20	1.2	23	13	16
34	Stephen Gossard	7	1.4	10	0	1
02	Daniel Collie	8	0.5	4	1	4
