= 2013–14 Milwaukee Panthers men's basketball team =

American college basketball season

2013–14 Milwaukee Panthers men's basketball

Horizon League tournament champions

NCAA tournament, round of 64
- Conference: Horizon League
- Record: 21–14 (7–9 Horizon)
- Head coach: Rob Jeter (9th season)
- Assistant coaches: Duffy Conroy (10th season); Chad Boudreau (9th season); Sharif Chambliss (2nd season)
- Home arena: U.S. Cellular Arena; Klotsche Center

2013–14 Horizon League men's basketball standings
	Conf.				Overall
Team	W		L	PCT	W		L	PCT
Green Bay	14	–	2	.875	24	–	7	.774
Cleveland State	12	–	4	.750	21	–	12	.636
Wright State	10	–	6	.625	21	–	15	.583
Valparaiso	9	–	7	.563	18	–	16	.529
Milwaukee †	7	–	9	.438	21	–	14	.600
Oakland	7	–	9	.438	13	–	20	.394
Youngstown State	6	–	10	.375	15	–	17	.469
Detroit	6	–	10	.375	13	–	19	.406
UIC	1	–	15	.063	6	–	25	.194
† 2014 Horizon League Tournament winner

The 2013–14 Milwaukee Panthers men's basketball team represented the University of Wisconsin–Milwaukee during the 2013–14 NCAA Division I men's basketball season. The Panthers, led by head coach Rob Jeter, played their home games at the U.S. Cellular Arena and Klotsche Center and were members of the Horizon League. They finished the season 21–14, 7–9 in Horizon League play to finish in a tie for fifth place. They were champions of the Horizon League tournament to earn an automatic bid to the NCAA tournament where they lost in the second round to Villanova.

== Roster ==
2013–14 Milwaukee Panthers men's basketball team
Players
Coaches

Pos.	#	Name	Height	Weight	Year	Hometown
G	1	Jordan Aaron	5 ft 10 in (1.78 m)	160 lb (73 kg)	Sr	Bronx, New York
G	2	Akeem Springs (redshirt)	6 ft 4 in (1.93 m)	210 lb (95 kg)	So	Waukegan, Illinois
F	3	Kyle Kelm	6 ft 9 in (2.06 m)	225 lb (102 kg)	Sr	Randolph, Wisconsin
F	4	Malcolm Moore	6 ft 7 in (2.01 m)	230 lb (104 kg)	Sr	Iowa City, Iowa
G	5	Cody Wichmann	6 ft 5 in (1.96 m)	210 lb (95 kg)	Fr	Pulaski, Wisconsin
G	10	Thierno Niang	6 ft 1 in (1.85 m)	205 lb (93 kg)	Sr	Dakar, Senegal
G	11	Connor Weas (redshirt)	6 ft 4 in (1.93 m)	180 lb (82 kg)	So	Whitefish Bay, Wisconsin
G	15	Trinson White	6 ft 5 in (1.96 m)	190 lb (86 kg)	Jr	Milwaukee, Wisconsin
G	20	Mitch Roelke	6 ft 0 in (1.83 m)	170 lb (77 kg)	Sr	Waunakee, Wisconsin
F	21	Dan Studer (redshirt)	6 ft 7 in (2.01 m)	230 lb (104 kg)	So	Germantown, Wisconsin
G	22	Evan Richard	6 ft 2 in (1.88 m)	175 lb (79 kg)	Jr	Kieler, Wisconsin
F	23	J.J. Panoske	6 ft 10 in (2.08 m)	225 lb (102 kg)	So	Brodhead, Wisconsin
G	25	Steve McWhorter	6 ft 2 in (1.88 m)	185 lb (84 kg)	Jr	Racine, Wisconsin
G	30	JeVon Lyle	6 ft 2 in (1.88 m)	175 lb (79 kg)	So	Kansas City, Missouri
F	31	Matt Tiby	6 ft 8 in (2.03 m)	230 lb (104 kg)	So	Urbandale, Iowa
F	33	Quinton Gustavson	6 ft 9 in (2.06 m)	200 lb (91 kg)	Sr	Racine, Wisconsin
F	34	Austin Arians	6 ft 6 in (1.98 m)	200 lb (91 kg)	So	Stoughton, Wisconsin
F	50	Brett Prahl	6 ft 9 in (2.06 m)	225 lb (102 kg)	Fr	East Troy, Wisconsin
F	52	Alex Prahl	6 ft 9 in (2.06 m)	225 lb (102 kg)	Fr	East Troy, Wisconsin

Head coach

- Rob Jeter (UW–Platteville)

Assistant coach(es)

- Chad Boudreau (Hannibal–LaGrange)
- Duffy Conroy (St. Ambrose)
- Sharif Chambliss (Wisconsin)

Legend

- (C) Team captain
- (S) Suspended
- (I) Ineligible
- (W) Walk-on
- Injured
- Current redshirt

== Schedule ==
- All conference games aired on the Horizon League website

Date time, TV	Rank^{#}	Opponent^{#}	Result	Record	Site (attendance) city, state
Regular season
11/08/2013*; 7:00 pm		at Loyola	L 72–76	0–1	Joseph J. Gentile Arena (2,247); Chicago, IL
11/11/2013*; 7:00 pm, ESPN3		at Davidson	W 81–77	1–1	John M. Belk Arena (3,453); Davidson, NC
11/15/2013*; 5:30 pm		vs. San Jose State; NIU Invitational	W 64–61	2–1	Convocation Center (1,113); DeKalb, IL
11/16/2013*; 5:30 pm		vs. James Madison; NIU Invitational	W 77–66	3–1	Convocation Center (753); DeKalb, IL
11/17/2013*; 3:30 pm		at Northern Illinois; NIU Invitational	W 82–69	4–1	Convocation Center (474); DeKalb, IL
11/19/2013*; 7:00 pm, TWCSC		DePaul	L 71–80	4–2	U.S. Cellular Arena (3,186); Milwaukee, WI
11/23/2013*; 7:00 pm		at Tennessee Tech	W 70–63	5–2	Eblen Center (1,114); Cookeville, TN
11/26/2013*; 7:00 pm		Judson	W 89–56	6–2	U.S. Cellular Arena (1,586); Milwaukee, WI
11/30/2013*; 7:05 pm, TWCSC		at UMKC	W 84–79	7–2	Municipal Auditorium (1,325); Kansas City, MO
12/03/2013*; 7:00 pm, TWCSC		Northern Iowa	W 83–72	8–2	U.S. Cellular Arena (2,637); Milwaukee, WI
12/07/2013*; 3:00 pm		Bradley	W 73–67	9–2	Klotsche Center (2,498); Milwaukee, WI
12/11/2013*; 7:00 pm		at No. 4 Wisconsin	L 52–78	9–3	Kohl Center (16,987); Madison, WI
12/21/2013*; 5:00 pm		vs. Northeastern; Westin Holiday Classic	L 59–62	9–4	Lakefront Arena (2,001); New Orleans, LA
12/22/2013*; 3:00 pm		vs. Alabama State; Westin Holiday Classic	W 67–54	10–4	Lakefront Arena (2,111); New Orleans, LA
1/02/2014; 7:00 pm, HLN		Youngstown State	W 82–76	11–4 (1–0)	U.S. Cellular Arena (2,362); Milwaukee, WI
1/04/2014; 7:00 pm, TWCSC		Cleveland State	L 49–77	11–5 (1–1)	U.S. Cellular Arena (2,846); Milwaukee, WI
1/08/2014; 6:00 pm, HLN		at Oakland	W 84–75	12–5 (2–1)	Athletics Center O'rena (1,427); Rochester, MI
1/12/2014; 1:00 pm, TWCSC		Green Bay	L 86–93 ^{OT}	12–6 (2–2)	U.S. Cellular Arena (4,212); Milwaukee, WI
1/16/2014; 7:00 pm, TWCSC		at UIC	W 67–63	13–6 (3–2)	UIC Pavilion (2,794); Chicago, IL
1/18/2014; 1:00 pm, TWCSC		at Valparaiso	L 62–75	13–7 (3–3)	Athletics–Recreation Center (3,281); Valparaiso, IN
1/21/2014; 6:00 pm, TWCSC		at Wright State	L 57–73	13–8 (3–4)	Nutter Center (3,274); Fairborn, OH
1/24/2014; 7:00 pm, HLN		Detroit	L 54–73	13–9 (3–5)	U.S. Cellular Arena (3,524); Milwaukee, WI
1/30/2014; 7:00 pm, TWCSC		Wright State	W 68–64	14–9 (4–5)	Klotsche Center (2,129); Milwaukee, WI
2/02/2014; 12:00 pm, HLN		Oakland	W 86–64	15–9 (5–5)	Klotsche Center (2,047); Milwaukee, WI
2/08/2014; 1:00 pm, TWCSC/ESPN3		at Green Bay	W 73–63	16–9 (6–5)	Resch Center (6,071); Green Bay, WI
2/15/2014; 7:00 pm, TWCSC		Valparaiso	L 62–77	16–10 (6–6)	U.S. Cellular Arena (5,815); Milwaukee, WI
2/20/2014; 6:05 pm, HLN		at Youngstown State	L 83–88 ^{OT}	16–11 (6–7)	Beeghly Center (1,505); Youngstown, OH
2/22/2014; 1:00 pm, TWCSC		at Cleveland State	L 50–74	16–12 (6–8)	Wolstein Center (2,079); Cleveland, OH
2/25/2014; 7:00 pm, HLN		UIC	L 58–80	16–13 (6–9)	U.S. Cellular Arena (2,968); Milwaukee, WI
2/27/2014; 6:00 pm, HLN		at Detroit	W 68–62	17–13 (7–9)	Calihan Hall (2,078); Detroit, MI
Horizon League tournament
3/04/2014; 7:00 pm, HLN		Detroit; First round	W 83–73	18–13	U.S. Cellular Arena (1,204); Milwaukee, WI
3/07/2014; 8:30 pm, ESPN3		vs. Valparaiso; Second round	W 74–57	19–13	Resch Center (1,770); Green Bay, WI
3/08/2014; 8:30 pm, ESPNU		at Green Bay; Semifinals	W 73–66 ^{OT}	20–13	Resch Center (7,113); Green Bay, WI
3/11/2014; 6:00 pm, ESPN		at Wright State; Championship	W 69–63	21–13	Nutter Center (7,784); Fairborn, OH
NCAA tournament
3/20/2014; 8:30 pm, TBS	No. (15 E)	vs. No. 6 (2 E) Villanova; Second round	L 53–73	21–14	First Niagara Center (18,706); Buffalo, NY
*Non-conference game. ^{#}Rankings from AP Poll. (#) Tournament seedings in parentheses. All times are in Central Time. (#) during NCAA Tournament is seed within region E=East.
