= 2013–14 Green Bay Phoenix men's basketball team =

American college basketball season

2013–14 Green Bay Phoenix men's basketball

Horizon League regular season champions

NIT, First Round
- Conference: Horizon League
- Record: 24–7 (14–2 Horizon)
- Head coach: Brian Wardle
- Assistant coaches: Brian Barone; Jimmie Foster; Chrys Cornelius
- Home arena: Resch Center

2013–14 Horizon League men's basketball standings
	Conf.				Overall
Team	W		L	PCT	W		L	PCT
Green Bay	14	–	2	.875	24	–	7	.774
Cleveland State	12	–	4	.750	21	–	12	.636
Wright State	10	–	6	.625	21	–	15	.583
Valparaiso	9	–	7	.563	18	–	16	.529
Milwaukee †	7	–	9	.438	21	–	14	.600
Oakland	7	–	9	.438	13	–	20	.394
Youngstown State	6	–	10	.375	15	–	17	.469
Detroit	6	–	10	.375	13	–	19	.406
UIC	1	–	15	.063	6	–	25	.194
† 2014 Horizon League Tournament winner

The 2013–14 Green Bay Phoenix men's basketball team represented the University of Wisconsin–Green Bay in the 2013–14 NCAA Division I men's basketball season. Their head coach was fourth year coach Brian Wardle. The Phoenix played their home games at the Resch Center and were members of the Horizon League. They finished the season 24–7, 14–2 in Horizon League play to claim the Horizon League regular season championship. They lost in the semifinals of the Horizon League tournament to Milwaukee. As a regular season conference champion who failed to win their conference tournament, they received an automatic bid to the National Invitation Tournament where they lost in the first round to Belmont.

== Roster ==
2013–14 Green Bay Phoenix men's basketball team
Players
Coaches

Pos.	#	Name	Height	Weight	Year	Hometown
G	2	Turner Botz	6 ft 7 in (2.01 m)	215 lb (98 kg)	Fr	Little Chute, WI
G/F	4	Jordan Fouse	6 ft 7 in (2.01 m)	220 lb (100 kg)	So	Racine, WI
G	5	Lamin Fulton	5 ft 10 in (1.78 m)	175 lb (79 kg)	Jr	Philadelphia, PA
G	10	Josh Humphrey	6 ft 5 in (1.96 m)	198 lb (90 kg)	RS So	Chicago, IL
G	12	Carrington Love	6 ft 1 in (1.85 m)	171 lb (78 kg)	So	Milwaukee, WI
F	15	Greg Mays	6 ft 9 in (2.06 m)	220 lb (100 kg)	Jr	Chicago, IL
C	21	Alec Brown	7 ft 1 in (2.16 m)	235 lb (107 kg)	Sr	Winona, MN
G	24	Keifer Sykes	5 ft 11 in (1.8 m)	175 lb (79 kg)	Jr	Chicago, IL
G	32	Tevin Findlay	6 ft 4 in (1.93 m)	190 lb (86 kg)	Fr	Malton, Ontario, CAN
F	34	Alfonzo McKinnie	6 ft 8 in (2.03 m)	215 lb (98 kg)	RS Jr	Chicago, IL
G	35	Vincent Garrett	6 ft 6 in (1.98 m)	220 lb (100 kg)	Sr	Chicago, IL
F	45	Kenneth Lowe	6 ft 8 in (2.03 m)	230 lb (104 kg)	Fr	Little Chute, WI

Head coach

- Brian Wardle (Marquette)

Assistant coach(es)

- Brian Barone (Marquette)
- Jimmie Foster (South Dakota)
- Chrys Cornelius (Western Illinois)

Legend

- (C) Team captain
- (S) Suspended
- (I) Ineligible
- (W) Walk-on
- Injured
- Current redshirt

Roster
Last update: 2013-11-08

== Schedule ==
Date time, TV	Rank^{#}	Opponent^{#}	Result	Record	Site (attendance) city, state
Regular season
11/09/2013*; 1:00 pm		vs. Northern Michigan	W 71–49	1–0	Kress Events Center (1,663); Green Bay, WI
11/16/2013*; 7:00 pm, ESPN3		No. 20 Wisconsin	L 66–69	1–1	Resch Center (9,906); Green Bay, WI
11/23/2013*; 7:00 pm		Minnesota Duluth	W 92–57	2–1	Resch Center (2,356); Green Bay, WI
11/28/2013*; 8:30 pm, CBSSN		vs. Pepperdine; Great Alaska Shootout First Round	W 97–89	3–1	Sullivan Arena (3,815); Anchorage, AK
11/29/2013*; 11:00 pm, CBSSN		vs. Harvard; Great Alaska Shootout semifinals	L 64–76	3–2	Sullivan Arena (4,064); Anchorage, AK
11/30/2013*; 9:00 pm, CBSSN		vs. Tulsa; Great Alaska Shootout 3rd place game	W 67–59	4–2	Sullivan Arena (4,107); Anchorage, AK
12/07/2013*; 4:00 pm, ESPNU		Virginia	W 75–72	5–2	Resch Center (6,491); Green Bay, WI
12/10/2013*; 6:00 pm		at Eastern Michigan	L 58–67	5–3	Convocation Center (583); Ypsilanti, MI
12/14/2013*; 7:00 pm		at South Dakota	W 89–85	6–3	DakotaDome (1,735); Vermillion, SD
12/17/2013*; 7:00 pm		Tennessee Tech	W 76–49	7–3	Resch Center (2,013); Green Bay, WI
12/21/2013*; 1:00 pm		Fairfield	W 74–58	8–3	Resch Center (2,830); Green Bay, WI
12/28/2013*; 1:00 pm		St. Francis (IL)	W 91–41	9–3	Resch Center (2,024); Green Bay, WI
1/02/2014; 7:00 pm		Cleveland State	W 66–55	10–3 (1–0)	Resch Center (2,298); Green Bay, WI
1/04/2014; 1:00 pm		Youngstown State	W 85–69	11–3 (2–0)	Resch Center (2,644); Green Bay, WI
1/07/2014*; 7:05 pm		at Chicago State	W 98–62	12–3	Emil and Patricia Jones Convocation Center (879); Chicago, IL
1/12/2014; 1:00 pm		at Milwaukee	W 93–86 ^{OT}	13–3 (3–0)	U.S. Cellular Arena (4,212); Milwaukee, WI
1/17/2014; 6:00 pm, ESPNU		at Wright State	W 79–69	14–3 (4–0)	Nutter Center (6,600); Fairborn, OH
1/19/2014; 1:00 pm		at UIC	W 69–64	15–3 (5–0)	UIC Pavilion (2,089); Chicago, IL
1/22/2014; 7:00 pm		Oakland	W 83–69	16–3 (6–0)	Resch Center (2,569); Green Bay, WI
1/26/2014; 1:00 pm		Detroit	W 62–52	17–3 (7–0)	Resch Center (5,503); Green Bay, WI
1/29/2014; 7:05 pm, ESPN3		at Valparaiso	L 60–75	17–4 (7–1)	Athletics–Recreation Center (3,524); Valparaiso, IN
2/01/2014; 5:00 pm, ESPN2		Wright State	W 62–55	18–4 (8–1)	Resch Center (5,098); Green Bay, WI
2/05/2014; 7:00 pm		UIC	W 81–70	19–4 (9–1)	Resch Center (2,733); Green Bay, WI
2/08/2014; 1:00 pm, ESPN3		Milwaukee	L 63–73	19–5 (9–2)	Resch Center (6,071); Green Bay, WI
2/13/2014; 6:05 pm, ESPN3		at Youngstown State	W 71–40	20–5 (10–2)	Beeghly Center (2,153); Youngstown, OH
2/15/2014; 2:00 pm		at Cleveland State	W 68–54	21–5 (11–2)	Wolstein Center (4,033); Cleveland, OH
2/20/2014; 7:00 pm		Valparaiso	W 67–53	22–5 (12–2)	Resch Center (3,564); Green Bay, WI
2/27/2014; 7:00 pm, ESPNU		at Oakland	W 71–63	23–5 (13–2)	Athletics Center O'rena (2,731); Rochester, MI
3/01/2014; 3:00 pm		at Detroit	W 75–66	24–5 (14–2)	Calihan Hall (2,075); Detroit, MI
Horizon League tournament
3/08/2014; 8:30 pm, ESPN3		Milwaukee; Semifinals	L 66–73 ^{OT}	24–6	Resch Center (7,113); Green Bay, WI
NIT
3/18/2014*; 7:15 pm, ESPN3	No. (4)	(5) Belmont; First round	L 65–80	24–7	Resch Center (2,770); Green Bay, WI
*Non-conference game. ^{#}Rankings from AP Poll, (#) during NIT is seed within region. (#) Tournament seedings in parentheses. All times are in Central Time.
