= 2013–14 UIC Flames men's basketball team =

American college basketball season

2013–14 UIC Flames men's basketball
- Conference: Horizon League
- Record: 6–25 (1–15 Horizon)
- Head coach: Howard Moore
- Assistant coaches: Al Biancalana; Donnie Kirksey; Stew Robinson
- Home arena: UIC Pavilion

2013–14 Horizon League men's basketball standings
	Conf.				Overall
Team	W		L	PCT	W		L	PCT
Green Bay	14	–	2	.875	24	–	7	.774
Cleveland State	12	–	4	.750	21	–	12	.636
Wright State	10	–	6	.625	21	–	15	.583
Valparaiso	9	–	7	.563	18	–	16	.529
Milwaukee †	7	–	9	.438	21	–	14	.600
Oakland	7	–	9	.438	13	–	20	.394
Youngstown State	6	–	10	.375	15	–	17	.469
Detroit	6	–	10	.375	13	–	19	.406
UIC	1	–	15	.063	6	–	25	.194
† 2014 Horizon League Tournament winner

The 2013–14 UIC Flames men's basketball team represented the University of Illinois at Chicago in the 2013–14 NCAA Division I men's basketball season. Their head coach was Howard Moore, serving his fourth year. The Flames played their home games at the UIC Pavilion and were members of the Horizon League. They finished the season 6–25, 1–15 in Horizon League play to finish in last place. They lost in the first round of the Horizon League tournament to Valparaiso.

== Roster ==
2013–14 UIC Flames men's basketball team
Players
Coaches

Pos.	#	Name	Height	Weight	Year	Hometown
G	1	Marcus White	5 ft 11 in (1.8 m)	150 lb (68 kg)	Fr	Chicago, IL
G	2	Gabe Snider	6 ft 4 in (1.93 m)	185 lb (84 kg)	So	Chicago, IL
G	3	Joey Miller	6 ft 3 in (1.91 m)	175 lb (79 kg)	Jr	San Marcos, TX
G/F	4	Lance Whitaker	6 ft 4 in (1.93 m)	195 lb (88 kg)	Fr	Bartlett, IL
G	10	Marc Brown	6 ft 4 in (1.93 m)	200 lb (91 kg)	Jr	Dallas, TX
G/F	11	Pat Bird	6 ft 5 in (1.96 m)	190 lb (86 kg)	Fr	Plano, TX
F	13	Hayden Humes	6 ft 8 in (2.03 m)	216 lb (98 kg)	RS Sr	Valparaiso, IN
F/C	15	Jordan Harks	6 ft 8 in (2.03 m)	220 lb (100 kg)	Sr	Lombard, IL
G	23	Jay Parker	5 ft 10 in (1.78 m)	170 lb (77 kg)	Jr	Harvey, IL
G	25	Frank Dounis	6 ft 2 in (1.88 m)	185 lb (84 kg)	Fr	Park Ridge, IL
F	32	Hans Christian Lauer	6 ft 7 in (2.01 m)	210 lb (95 kg)	Fr	Klein-Winternheim, GER
F	33	Ahman Fells	6 ft 5 in (1.96 m)	183 lb (83 kg)	Jr	Chicago, IL
G	34	Markese McGuire	6 ft 3 in (1.91 m)	200 lb (91 kg)	Fr	Elkhart, IN
F	40	Jake Wiegand	6 ft 8 in (2.03 m)	235 lb (107 kg)	So	Herndon, VA
C	44	Will Simonton	6 ft 10 in (2.08 m)	235 lb (107 kg)	Jr	Vienna, VA
G	45	Kelsey Barlow	6 ft 5 in (1.96 m)	200 lb (91 kg)	Sr	Indianapolis, IN

Head coach

- Howard Moore (Wisconsin)

Assistant coach(es)

- Al Biancalana (Elmhurst)
- Donnie Kirksey (Roosevelt)
- Stew Robinson (Indiana)

Legend

- (C) Team captain
- (S) Suspended
- (I) Ineligible
- (W) Walk-on
- Injured
- Current redshirt

Roster
Last update: 2013-11-07

== Schedule ==
Date time, TV	Opponent	Result	Record	Site (attendance) city, state
Regular season
11/09/2013*; 7:00 pm, ESPN3/CSN	Drake	L 59–61	0–1	UIC Pavilion (5,245); Chicago, IL
11/13/2013*; 7:00 pm, HLN	Roosevelt	W 87–65	1–1	UIC Pavilion (2,200); Chicago, IL
11/16/2013*; 3:00 pm, HLN	Eastern Illinois	L 66–86	1–2	UIC Pavilion (3,067); Chicago, IL
11/20/2013*; 7:00 pm, ESPN3/CSN	Northwestern	L 58–93	1–3	UIC Pavilion (5,630); Chicago, IL
11/25/2013*; 1:30 pm	vs. San Diego; Gulf Coast Showcase	W 74–70	2–3	Germain Arena (233); Estero, FL
11/26/2013*; 5:00 pm	vs. Louisiana Tech; Gulf Coast Showcase	L 78–103	2–4	Germain Arena (N/A); Estero, FL
11/27/2013*; 5:00 pm	vs. Wagner; Gulf Coast Showcase	W 94–76	3–4	Germain Arena (N/A); Estero, FL
12/04/2013*; 7:00 pm, ESPN3/CSN	SMU	L 65–73	3–5	UIC Pavilion (4,438); Chicago, IL
12/07/2013*; 3:00 pm, CSN	at Loyola–Chicago	L 70–73	3–6	Joseph J. Gentile Arena (2,017); Chicago, IL
12/14/2013*; 7:00 pm	at Southeast Missouri	W 75–69	4–6	Show Me Center (1,967); Cape Girardeau, MO
12/17/2013*; 7:00 pm, HLN	Purdue-Calumet	W 88–61	5–6	UIC Pavilion (1,624); Chicago, IL
12/20/2013*; 9:00 pm	at UC Riverside	L 56–57	5–7	UC Riverside Student Recreation Center (145); Riverside, CA
12/23/2013*; 8:00 pm	at Colorado State	L 61–74	5–8	Moby Arena (3,225); Fort Collins, CO
12/28/2013*; 1:00 pm, BTN	vs. Illinois	L 60–74	5–9	United Center (13,017); Chicago, IL
1/02/2014; 7:05 pm, ESPN3	at Valparaiso	L 72–87	5–10 (0–1)	Athletics–Recreation Center (2,775); Valparaiso, IN
1/07/2014; 7:00 pm, HLN	Youngstown State	L 62–75	5–11 (0–2)	UIC Pavilion (N/A); Chicago, IL
1/12/2014; 6:00 pm, ESPN3	at Wright State	L 53–58	5–12 (0–3)	Nutter Center (3,008); Fairborn, OH
1/16/2014; 7:00 pm, ESPN3	Milwaukee	L 63–67	5–13 (0–4)	UIC Pavilion (2,794); Chicago, IL
1/19/2014; 1:00 pm, HLN	Green Bay	L 64–69	5–14 (0–5)	UIC Pavilion (2,089); Chicago, IL
1/22/2014; 7:00 pm, HLN	Cleveland State	L 64–74	5–15 (0–6)	UIC Pavilion (1,681); Chicago, IL
1/25/2014; 1:00 pm, HLN	at Oakland	L 75–76	5–16 (0–7)	Athletics Center O'Rena (2,987); Rochester, MI
1/29/2014; 6:00 pm, HLN	at Detroit	L 68–74	5–17 (0–8)	Calihan Hall (1,452); Detroit, MI
2/01/2014; 3:00 pm, ESPN3	Valparaiso	L 46–70	5–18 (0–9)	UIC Pavilion (3,197); Chicago, IL
2/05/2014; 7:00 pm, HLN	at Green Bay	L 70–81	5–19 (0–10)	Resch Center (2,733); Ashwaubenon, WI
2/13/2014; 6:00 pm, HLN	at Cleveland State	L 53–73	5–20 (0–11)	Wolstein Center (3,079); Cleveland, OH
2/15/2014; 6:00 pm, HLN	at Youngstown State	L 56–59	5–21 (0–12)	Beeghly Center (3,559); Youngstown, OH
2/18/2014; 7:00 pm, ESPN3	Detroit	L 59–65	5–22 (0–13)	UIC Pavilion (2,538); Chicago, IL
2/21/2014; 7:00 pm	Oakland	L 71–86	5–23 (0–14)	UIC Pavilion (2,697); Chicago, IL
2/25/2014; 7:00 pm, HLN	at Milwaukee	W 80–58	6–23 (1–14)	Klotsche Center (2,968); Milwaukee, WI
3/01/2014; 1:00 pm, ESPN3	Wright State	L 61–68	6–24 (1–15)	UIC Pavilion (4,362); Chicago, IL
2014 Horizon League tournament
3/04/2014; 6:00 pm	at Valparaiso; First Round	L 63–73	6–25	Athletics–Recreation Center (1,099); Valparaiso, IN
*Non-conference game. ^{#}Rankings from AP Poll. (#) Tournament seedings in parentheses. All times are in Central Time.
