= 2014 Horizon League men's basketball tournament =

American collegiate postseason men's basketball tournament

- Classification: Division I
- Season: 2013–14
- Teams: 9
- First round site: Campus sites
- Semifinals site: Resch Center; Green Bay, Wisconsin
- Finals site: Nutter Center; Fairborn, Ohio
- Champions: Milwaukee (4th title)
- Winning coach: Rob Jeter (2nd title)
- MVP: Jordan Aaron (Milwaukee)
- Television: Horizon League Network, ESPNU, ESPN

2013–14 Horizon League men's basketball standings
	Conf.				Overall
Team	W		L	PCT	W		L	PCT
Green Bay	14	–	2	.875	24	–	7	.774
Cleveland State	12	–	4	.750	21	–	12	.636
Wright State	10	–	6	.625	21	–	15	.583
Valparaiso	9	–	7	.563	18	–	16	.529
Milwaukee †	7	–	9	.438	21	–	14	.600
Oakland	7	–	9	.438	13	–	20	.394
Youngstown State	6	–	10	.375	15	–	17	.469
Detroit	6	–	10	.375	13	–	19	.406
UIC	1	–	15	.063	6	–	25	.194
† 2014 Horizon League Tournament winner

The 2014 Horizon League Men's Basketball Tournament began on March 4 and ended with the championship game on Tuesday March 11. First round games were played on the home court of the higher-seeded team. The second round and semifinals were hosted by the No. 1 seed Green Bay, while the highest remaining seed hosted the championship game. All Horizon League schools participated in the tournament. Teams were seeded by 2013–14 Horizon League season record, with a tiebreaker system to seed teams with identical conference records, the top two teams received a bye to the semifinals.

== Seeds ==
Seed	Team	Record	Tiebreaker
1	Green Bay	14–2	
2	Cleveland State	12–4	
3	Wright State	10–6	
4	Valparaiso	9–7	
5	Milwaukee	7–9	2–0 vs Oakland
6	Oakland	7–9	0–2 vs Milwaukee
7	Youngstown State	6–10	1–1 vs Detroit; 0–2 vs #1 Green Bay, 1–1 vs #2 Cleveland State
8	Detroit	6–10	1–1 vs Youngstown State; 0–2 vs #1 Green Bay, 0–2 vs #2 Cleveland State
9	UIC	1–15	

== Schedule ==
The tournament schedule is listed in the following table.

Game	Time	Matchup	Television
First round – Tuesday, March 4
1	8:05 pm	#9 UIC at #4 Valparaiso	Horizon League Network
2	7:00 pm	#8 Detroit at #5 Milwaukee	Horizon League Network
3	7:00 pm	#7 Youngstown State at #6 Oakland	Horizon League Network
Second round – Friday, March 7 (hosted by Green Bay)
4	7:00 pm	#3 Wright State vs. #6 Oakland	Horizon League Network
5	9:30 pm	#4 Valparaiso vs. #5 Milwaukee	Horizon League Network
Semifinals – Saturday, March 8 (hosted by Green Bay)
6	7:00 pm	#3 Wright State vs. #2 Cleveland State	ESPNU *
7	9:30 pm	#5 Milwaukee at #1 Green Bay	ESPNU
Championship – Tuesday, March 11 (hosted by Wright State)
8	7:00 pm	#5 Milwaukee at #3 Wright State	ESPN
All game times in Eastern Time Zone. * Tape delayed on ESPNU at 11:30 pm EST.

== Bracket ==
First round March 4
4	Valparaiso	73
9	UIC	63
5	Milwaukee	83
8	Detroit	73
6	Oakland	96^{OT}
7	Youngstown State	92

Second round March 7
4	Valparaiso	57
5	Milwaukee	74
3	Wright State	73
6	Oakland	57

Semifinals; March 8
1	Green Bay	66
5	Milwaukee	73^{OT}
2	Cleveland State	63
3	Wright State	68

Championship; March 11
5	Milwaukee	69
3	Wright State	63

First round games at campus sites of higher seeds
Second round and semifinals hosted by No. 1 seed Green Bay
Championship game hosted by highest remaining seed
