= 2013–14 IUPUI Jaguars men's basketball team =

American college basketball season

2013–14 IUPUI Jaguars men's basketball
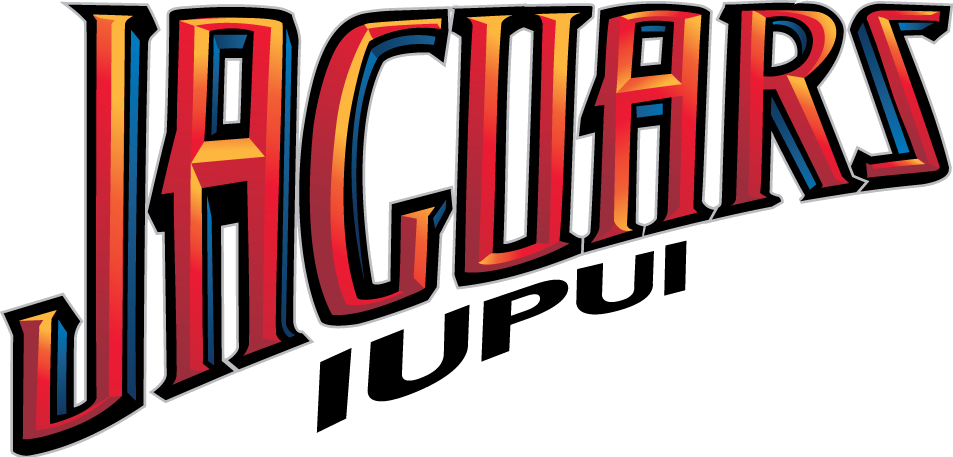
- Conference: Summit League
- Record: 6–26 (1–13 The Summit)
- Head coach: Todd Howard (3rd season)
- Assistant coaches: Matt Crenshaw; David Padgett; Don Carlisle
- Home arena: The Jungle

2013–14 Summit League men's basketball standings
	Conf.				Overall
Team	W		L	PCT	W		L	PCT
North Dakota State †	12	–	2	.857	26	–	7	.788
IPFW	10	–	4	.714	25	–	11	.694
South Dakota State	10	–	4	.714	19	–	13	.594
Denver	8	–	6	.571	16	–	15	.516
South Dakota	6	–	8	.429	12	–	18	.400
Omaha *	5	–	9	.357	17	–	15	.531
Western Illinois	4	–	10	.286	10	–	20	.333
IUPUI	1	–	13	.071	6	–	26	.188
† 2014 Summit League tournament winner Rankings from AP poll *ineligible for NCAA postseason Div. I tournament due to Div. I transition

The 2013–14 IUPUI Jaguars men's basketball team represented Indiana University–Purdue University Indianapolis during the 2013–14 NCAA Division I men's basketball season. The Jaguars, led by third-year head coach Todd Howard, played their home games at IUPUI Gymnasium (better known as The Jungle) in Indianapolis, Indiana and were members of the Summit League. They finished the season 6–26, 1–13 in Summit League play, to finish in last (8th) place. They lost in the first round of the Summit League tournament to IPFW.

On March 9, head coach Todd Howard was fired after a record of 26–70 in three seasons.

== Roster ==
Number	Name	Position	Height	Weight	Year	Hometown
0	Cortell Busby	Guard	6' 2"	190	RS–Freshman	Chester, SC
1	Khufu Najee	Guard	6' 4"	185	Junior	Berkeley, CA
2	Ja'Rob McCallum	Guard	6' 0"	170	Senior	Marion, IN
4	Ian Chiles	Guard	6' 1"	188	Junior	Louisville, KY
5	Linwood Ross Jr.	Guard	6' 5"	185	RS–Freshman	Miramar, FL
10	Jalen McCallum	Guard	5' 9"	160	RS–Freshman	Marion, IN
11	Josh James	Forward/Center	6' 9"	225	Freshman	Cedar Lake, IN
12	Justus Stanback	Forward	6' 8"	200	Freshman	West Lafayette, IN
14	Elijah Ray	Forward	6' 6"	230	RS–Freshman	Gary, IN
22	Marcellus Barksdale	Guard/Forward	6' 5"	200	Sophomore	Lexington, KY
23	P. J. Hubert	Guard	6' 5"	199	Senior	Greenfield, IN
30	Donovan Gibbs	Forward	6' 7"	200	Senior	Louisville, KY
42	Mitch Patton	Forward/Center	6' 9"	248	Senior	Vincennes, IN
	P. J. Boutte	Guard	5' 9"	160	Junior	Indianapolis, IN
	DavRon Williams	Forward	6' 7"	220	Junior	Marion, IN

== Schedule ==
Date time, TV	Opponent	Result	Record	Site (attendance) city, state
Exhibition
November 2, 2013*; 3:00 p.m.	Kentucky State	W 85–73		The Jungle (559); Indianapolis, IN
Regular season
November 8, 2013*; 9:00 p.m.	at Utah Valley	L 66–74	0–1	UCCU Center (1,437); Orem, UT
November 12, 2013*; 7:00 p.m., HTSN	Evansville	L 78–84	0–2	The Jungle (1,215); Indianapolis, IN
November 16, 2013*; 1:00 p.m.	Southeast Missouri State	L 68–76	0–3	The Jungle (550); Indianapolis, IN
November 19, 2013*; 7:00 p.m.	IU Northwest	W 88–53	1–3	The Jungle (597); Indianapolis, IN
November 22, 2013*; 8:00 p.m.	at Northwestern; Las Vegas Invitational	L 61–63	1–4	Welsh-Ryan Arena (5,915); Evanston, IL
November 25, 2013*; 7:00 p.m.	at Missouri; Las Vegas Invitational	L 64–78	1–5	Mizzou Arena (6,065); Columbia, MO
November 28, 2013*; 2:30 p.m.	vs. Gardner–Webb; Las Vegas Invitational	L 54–61	1–6	Orleans Arena (N/A); Paradise, NV
November 29, 2013*; 3:30 p.m.	vs. Chattanooga; Las Vegas Invitational	L 76–87	1–7	Orleans Arena (N/A); Paradise, NV
December 4, 2013*; 8:30 p.m.	at Bradley	W 72–66	2–7	Renaissance Coliseum (3,750); Peoria, IL
December 7, 2013*; 2:00 p.m.	North Carolina Central	W 71–65	3–7	The Jungle (675); Indianapolis, IN
December 10, 2013*; 7:00 p.m.	Cincinnati Christian	W 94–72	4–7	The Jungle (379); Indianapolis, IN
December 14, 2013*; 3:00 p.m., FS1	at Marquette	L 50–86	4–8	Bradley Center (13,972); Milwaukee, WI
December 18, 2013*; 7:00 p.m.	Nicholls State	L 56–62	4–9	The Jungle (653); Indianapolis, IN
December 21, 2013*; 3:30 p.m.	at Indiana State	L 61–81	4–10	Hulman Center (5,980); Terre Haute, IN
December 23, 2013*; 7:00 p.m.	at Southeast Missouri State	L 79–83 ^{OT}	4–11	Show Me Center (1,305); Cape Girardeau, MO
December 29, 2013*; 2:00 p.m., HTSN	Drake	L 52–75	4–12	The Jungle (583); Indianapolis, IN
January 2, 2014*; 7:00 p.m.	Judson	W 112–50	5–12	The Jungle (485); Indianapolis, IN
January 9, 2014; 7:00 p.m., HTSN	South Dakota State	L 70–86	5–13 (0–1)	The Jungle (359); Indianapolis, IN
January 11, 2014; 2:00 p.m., HTSN	North Dakota State	L 64–87	5–14 (0–2)	The Jungle (778); Indianapolis, IN
January 16, 2014; 8:00 p.m.	at South Dakota	L 57–69	5–15 (0–3)	DakotaDome (1,624); Vermillion, SD
January 18, 2014; 6:00 p.m.	at Denver	L 45–66	5–16 (0–4)	Magness Arena (3,547); Denver, CO
January 25, 2014; 7:00 p.m.	at IPFW	L 75–90	5–17 (0–5)	Gates Sports Center (954); Fort Wayne, IN
January 30, 2014; 7:00 p.m., HTSN	Western Illinois	L 54–69	5–18 (0–6)	The Jungle (524); Indianapolis, IN
February 1, 2014; 2:00 p.m., HTSN	Nebraska–Omaha	L 71–99	5–19 (0–7)	The Jungle (527); Indianapolis, IN
February 6, 2014; 8:00 p.m.	at North Dakota State	L 60–66	5–20 (0–8)	Bison Sports Arena (2,877); Fargo, ND
February 8, 2014; 5:00 p.m.	at South Dakota State	L 59–83	5–21 (0–9)	Frost Arena (3,393); Brookings, SD
February 13, 2014; 7:00 p.m.	Denver	W 59–49	6–21 (1–9)	The Jungle (478); Indianapolis, IN
February 15, 2014; 2:00 p.m.	South Dakota	L 67–71	6–22 (1–10)	The Jungle (420); Indianapolis, IN
February 22, 2014; 2:00 p.m., HTSN	IPFW	L 60–84	6–23 (1–11)	The Jungle (1,002); Indianapolis, IN
February 27, 2014; 8:00 p.m.	at Nebraska–Omaha	L 66–88	6–24 (1–12)	Ralston Arena (983); Ralston, NE
March 1, 2014; 8:00 p.m.	at Western Illinois	L 70–75	6–25 (1–13)	Western Hall (1,901); Macomb, IL
2014 Summit League tournament
March 8, 2014; 7:00 p.m., FCS Atlantic	vs. IPFW; Quarterfinals	L 47–85	6–26	Sioux Falls Arena (3,153); Sioux Falls, SD
*Non-conference game. ^{#}Rankings from AP poll. (#) Tournament seedings in parentheses. All times are in Eastern.
