= 2013–14 South Dakota State Jackrabbits men's basketball team =

American college basketball season

2013–14 South Dakota State Jackrabbits men's basketball

CBI first round vs. Old Dominion, L 65–72
- Conference: Summit League
- Record: 19–13 (10–4 The Summit)
- Head coach: Scott Nagy (19th season)
- Assistant coaches: Rob Klinkefus; Brian Cooley; Joe Krabbenhoft
- Home arena: Frost Arena

2013–14 Summit League men's basketball standings
	Conf.				Overall
Team	W		L	PCT	W		L	PCT
North Dakota State †	12	–	2	.857	26	–	7	.788
IPFW	10	–	4	.714	25	–	11	.694
South Dakota State	10	–	4	.714	19	–	13	.594
Denver	8	–	6	.571	16	–	15	.516
South Dakota	6	–	8	.429	12	–	18	.400
Omaha *	5	–	9	.357	17	–	15	.531
Western Illinois	4	–	10	.286	10	–	20	.333
IUPUI	1	–	13	.071	6	–	26	.188
† 2014 Summit League tournament winner Rankings from AP poll *ineligible for NCAA postseason Div. I tournament due to Div. I transition

The 2013–14 South Dakota State Jackrabbits men's basketball team represented South Dakota State University during the 2013–14 NCAA Division I men's basketball season. The Jackrabbits, led by 19th year head coach Scott Nagy, played their home games at Frost Arena and were members of The Summit League. They finished the season 19–13, 10–4 in The Summit League play to finish in a tie for second place. They advanced to the semifinals of The Summit League tournament where they lost to IPFW. They were invited to the College Basketball Invitational where they lost in the first round to Old Dominion.

== Roster ==
2013–14 South Dakota State Jackrabbits men's basketball team
Players
Coaches

Pos.	#	Name	Height	Weight	Year	Hometown
G/F	0	Matt Donlan	6 ft 6 in (1.98 m)	191 lb (87 kg)	RS Fr	Melbourne, Australia
G	1	Skyler Flatten	6 ft 6 in (1.98 m)	185 lb (84 kg)	Fr	Clark, South Dakota
G	2	Keaton Moffitt	6 ft 5 in (1.96 m)	190 lb (86 kg)	Jr	Sioux Falls, South Dakota
G	4	Jake Bittle	6 ft 4 in (1.93 m)	200 lb (91 kg)	So	Bixby, Oklahoma
G	5	Anders Broman	6 ft 2 in (1.88 m)	187 lb (85 kg)	Fr	Duluth, Minnesota
G	10	Joshua White	6 ft 2 in (1.88 m)	182 lb (83 kg)	RS Fr	Edwardsville, Illinois
G	12	Brayden Carlson	6 ft 4 in (1.93 m)	200 lb (91 kg)	Sr	Brookings, South Dakota
G	13	Cory Jacobsen	6 ft 1 in (1.85 m)	185 lb (84 kg)	RS So	Viborg, South Dakota
G/F	23	Lane Severyn	6 ft 5 in (1.96 m)	200 lb (91 kg)	RS Fr	Jefferson, South Dakota
G/F	24	Zach Horstman	6 ft 6 in (1.98 m)	205 lb (93 kg)	Jr	Winner, South Dakota
G	25	Chad White	6 ft 6 in (1.98 m)	202 lb (92 kg)	Sr	Madison, South Dakota
F	30	Connor Devine	6 ft 10 in (2.08 m)	217 lb (98 kg)	Fr	Wasilla, Alaska
F	32	Marcus Heemstra	6 ft 9 in (2.06 m)	220 lb (100 kg)	Sr	Rock Valley, Iowa
F	34	Cody Larson	6 ft 9 in (2.06 m)	236 lb (107 kg)	Jr	Sioux Falls, South Dakota
F	42	Jordan Dykstra	6 ft 8 in (2.03 m)	216 lb (98 kg)	Sr	Rock Valley, Iowa
F	44	Logan Doyle	6 ft 8 in (2.03 m)	200 lb (91 kg)	Fr	Alexandria, Minnesota

Head coach

- Scott Nagy (Delta State)

Assistant coach(es)

- Rob Klinkefus (Buena Vista)
- Brian Cooley (Nebraska Wesleyan)
- Joe Krabbenhoft (Wisconsin)

Legend

- (C) Team captain
- (S) Suspended
- (I) Ineligible
- (W) Walk-on
- Injured
- Current redshirt

Roster
Last update: 2013-11-13

== Schedule ==
Date time, TV	Opponent	Result	Record	Site (attendance) city, state
Exhibition
11/01/2013*; 8:30 pm	Dakota Wesleyan	W 96–73		Frost Arena (2,539); Brookings, SD
Regular season
11/08/2013*; 9:00 pm	at San Diego; USD Classic	L 70–74	0–1	Jenny Craig Pavilion (2,017); San Diego, CA
11/09/2013*; 5:30 pm	vs. Loyola Marymount; USD Classic	L 89–98	0–2	Jenny Craig Pavilion (2,409); San Diego, CA
11/14/2013*; 7:00 pm	Montana	L 69–77	0–3	Frost Arena (2,472); Brookings, SD
11/18/2013*; 7:00 pm	SW Minnesota State	W 83–62	1–3	Frost Arena (2,521); Brookings, SD
11/21/2013*; 7:00 pm, FSSW+	at Texas Tech; Legends Classic	L 54–68	1–4	United Spirit Arena (4,714); Lubbock, TX
11/25/2013*; 8:00 pm	Howard; Legends Classic	W 77–65	2–4	Frost Arena (1,910); Brookings, SD
11/26/2013*; 8:00 pm	Lehigh; Legends Classic	W 74–61	3–4	Frost Arena (1,696); Brookings, SD
11/29/2013*; 9:00 pm	at UC Santa Barbara	L 64–83	3–5	UCSB Events Center (1,857); Santa Barbara, CA
12/01/2013*; 7:00 pm	at Stanford; Legends Classic	L 60–92	3–6	Maples Pavilion (3,887); Stanford, CA
12/04/2013*; 7:00 pm	Dakota State	W 88–62	4–6	Frost Arena (1,128); Brookings, SD
12/10/2013*; 7:00 pm	at Minnesota	L 59–75	4–7	Williams Arena (11,349); Minneapolis, MN
12/14/2013*; 4:00 pm	Belmont	W 85–72	5–7	Frost Arena (2,037); Brookings, SD
12/18/2013*; 7:00 pm	Wayne State	W 75–56	6–7	Frost Arena (1,545); Brookings, SD
12/21/2013*; 4:00 pm	at North Dakota	W 77–70	7–7	Betty Engelstad Sioux Center (2,261); Grand Forks, ND
12/28/2013*; 7:05 pm	at UMKC	W 65–60	8–7	Municipal Auditorium (1,557); Kansas City, MO
01/03/2014*; 6:00 pm	at Buffalo			Alumni Arena; Amherst, NY
01/09/2014; 6:00 pm	at IUPUI	W 86–70	9–7 (1–0)	The Jungle (359); Indianapolis, IN
01/11/2014; 6:00 pm	at IPFW	L 75–82	9–8 (1–1)	Gates Sports Center (N/A); Fort Wayne, IN
01/16/2014; 7:00 pm	Western Illinois	W 64–55	10–8 (2–1)	Frost Arena (2,023); Brookings, SD
01/18/2014; 4:00 pm	Nebraska–Omaha	L 71–80	10–9 (2–2)	Frost Arena (3,274); Brookings, SD
01/25/2014; 4:00 pm	North Dakota State	L 77–85	10–10 (2–3)	Frost Arena (4,859); Brookings, SD
01/30/2014; 8:00 pm, Root Sports	at Denver	W 74–73	11–10 (3–3)	Magness Arena (1,877); Denver, CO
02/01/2014*; 4:00 pm	at South Dakota	W 70–68	12–10 (4–3)	DakotaDome (5,036); Vermillion, SD
02/06/2014; 7:00 pm	IPFW	W 79–51	13–10 (5–3)	Frost Arena (2,144); Brookings, SD
02/08/2014; 4:00 pm	IUPUI	W 83–59	14–10 (6–3)	Frost Arena (3,393); Brookings, SD
02/13/2014; 7:00 pm	at Nebraska–Omaha	W 77–60	15–10 (7–3)	Ralston Arena (1,376); Ralston, NE
02/15/2014; 7:00 pm	at Western Illinois	W 62–50	16–10 (8–3)	Western Hall (2,213); Macomb, IL
02/22/2014; 2:00 pm	at North Dakota State	L 59–74	16–11 (8–4)	Bison Sports Arena (5,614); Fargo, ND
02/27/2014; 7:00 pm	Denver	W 78–69	17–11 (9–4)	Frost Arena (2,743); Brookings, SD
03/01/2014; 4:00 pm	South Dakota	W 75–61	18–11 (10–4)	Frost Arena (5,509); Brookings, SD
The Summit League tournament
03/09/2014; 8:30 pm, FCS Atlantic	vs. Western Illinois; Quarterfinals	W 71–50	19–11	Sioux Falls Arena (6,647); Sioux Falls, SD
03/10/2014; 8:30 pm, FCS Atlantic	vs. IPFW; Semifinals	L 60–64	19–12	Sioux Falls Arena (6,769); Sioux Falls, SD
CBI
03/19/2014*; 6:00 pm	at Old Dominion; First round	L 65–72	19–13	Constant Center (1,487); Norfolk, VA
*Non-conference game. ^{#}Rankings from AP Poll. (#) Tournament seedings in parentheses. All times are in Central Time.

* The January 3 game vs. Buffalo was postponed due to inclement weather in the Northeast. The game was not rescheduled.

== The Zoo Incident ==
On January 13, Brayden "Plankton" Carlson and Marcus "Old Wet Pog" Heemstra were found "fully clothed" in the chimp pen of the Bramble Park Zoo of Watertown, South Dakota. According to reports from both passerby and police records, the men were hooting and scratching each other, as well as doing mock football plays with an invisible ball. No chimps were injured in the escapade, but Anders "Gulp" Broman reportedly suffered extreme intestinal distress on the bus home. The media dubbed both the chimp pen fiasco and Gulp's bus-diarrhea as "The Zoo Incident", although they are seemingly unrelated.
