= 2013–14 NCAA Division I men's basketball season =

Basketball season

- Preseason AP No. 1: Kentucky Wildcats
- Regular season: November 8, 2013 – March 16, 2014
- NCAA Tournament: 2014
- Tournament dates: March 18 – April 7, 2014
- National Championship: AT&T Stadium; Arlington, Texas
- NCAA Champions: UConn Huskies
- Other champions: Minnesota Golden Gophers (NIT), Siena Saints (CBI), Murray State Racers (CIT)
- Player of the Year (Naismith, Wooden): Doug McDermott, Creighton Bluejays

The 2013–14 NCAA Division I men's basketball season began on November 8, 2013 and ended with the 2014 NCAA Men's Division I Basketball Tournament, whose Final Four was played at AT&T Stadium in Arlington, Texas, on April 5, 2014, followed by the national championship game on April 7.

== Season headlines ==
- June 11 – The NCAA releases its annual Academic Progress Rate report. Three Division I men's basketball programs will be ineligible for postseason play in 2013–14; three others are ineligible pending appeals and NCAA review of data. The penalized programs are:
  - Arkansas–Pine Bluff (pending review)
  - FIU
  - Grambling State
  - Mississippi Valley State (pending review)
  - New Orleans
  - Southern (pending review)
- November 4 – The Associated Press preseason All-America team is released. Oklahoma State guard Marcus Smart was the only unanimous choice, gaining all 65 votes. He was joined by Doug McDermott of Creighton (63 votes), Louisville guard Russ Smith (52), Kansas freshman Andrew Wiggins (42) and Michigan forward Mitch McGary (34).
- November 12 – Freshmen and transfers are eligible for the preseason Wooden Award watch list for the first time in the trophy's history. Nine freshmen made the 50-member list, including three each from Kentucky (Andrew Harrison, Julius Randle and James Young) and Kansas (Andrew Wiggins, Wayne Selden, Jr. and Joel Embiid). Jabari Parker of Duke, Aaron Gordon of Arizona and Noah Vonleh of Indiana were the other three freshmen named.
- February 27 – Shortly after the end of Utah Valley's 66–61 home win over New Mexico State in a battle between the WAC co-leaders, NMSU guard K.C. Ross-Miller throws a basketball at Utah Valley's Holton Hunsaker (son of UVU head coach Dick Hunsaker), hitting him in the leg. The incident triggers a brawl between players and fans who had stormed the court, with video later showing that at least one NMSU player threw a punch, and another had to be forcibly pulled from the melee by staff. The next day, the WAC suspends two NMSU players—Ross-Miller for two games and Renaldo Dixon for one—for their involvement in the brawl. In addition, UVU announces that it was reviewing tapes of the incident to determine whether to take further action against its own students and fans who were involved.
- March 26 – South Florida, which had reached an agreement in principle with Manhattan coach Steve Masiello to fill that school's head coaching vacancy, rescinds the agreement after it discovers that Masiello lied on his résumé about graduating from the University of Kentucky. A UK spokesperson confirmed that Masiello attended for four years but did not receive a degree.
- April 7 – Manhattan announces that it will retain Masiello as head coach, contingent on him earning his bachelor's degree from UK. At the time, he was about 10 credit hours short of a degree, and was expected to complete the needed courses during the summer term. UK announced on May 29 that Masiello had completed the required coursework and would receive his degree in August.
- April 9 – UMass sophomore guard Derrick Gordon becomes the first active Division I men's college player to come out as gay.

=== Milestones and records ===
- Oakland guard Travis Bader, Devon Saddler of Delaware, Anthony Ireland of Loyola Marymount, USC Upstate forward Torrey Craig, Bryant forward Alex Francis, Cincinnati guard Sean Kilpatrick, Nevada guard Deonte Burton, Iowa State guard DeAndre Kane, Buffalo forward Javon McCrea and North Dakota swingman Troy Huff each passed the 2,000 point mark for their careers.
- November 19 – Wisconsin junior forward Frank Kaminsky broke the school's single-game scoring record. Kaminsky scored 43 points in a win over North Dakota. The previous record of 42 points was held by Ken Barnes and Michael Finley.
- December 14 – Aaron Craft broke Ohio State's career assist record (previously held by Jamar Butler) in a game against North Dakota State.
- December 18 – Texas Southern's Aaric Murray scored 48 points against Temple in the Liacouras Center, setting records for the most points scored against Temple by one player as well as a new arena record.
- January 25 – Duke head coach Mike Krzyzewski records his 900th career win at the school, becoming just the second Division I men's coach to achieve 900+ wins at one university (Jim Boeheim at Syracuse was the first; both were preceded in the women's game by Pat Summitt at Tennessee).
- Vermont forward Brian Voelkel became the first player in NCAA Division I history to record at least 1,000 career rebounds and 600 career assists.
- February 1 – Syracuse defeats Duke 91–89 in overtime before a record-setting crowd of 35,446, the largest basketball crowd in the Carrier Dome's history and an all-time NCAA record for an on-campus game.
- February 2 – Oakland's Travis Bader surpassed JJ Redick for the most NCAA Division I career three-point field goals made. Redick's 457 made three-pointers record had stood since 2007. He finished his career with 504.
- February 8 – Melvin Ejim of Iowa State scores a Big 12-record 48 points in an 84–69 win over TCU, surpassing Michael Beasley and Denis Clemente, both of Kansas State, who had 44 points in 2008 and 2009, respectively.
- February 10 – SMU enters the Associated Press Top 25 poll for the first time since the next-to-last poll of 1984–85, a span of 30 seasons.
- February 21 – Oakland's Travis Bader eclipsed Keydren Clark's career three-point attempts record of 1,192, which was set in 2006, almost three weeks after setting the new career three-pointers made mark. He finished his career with 1,246.
- March 1 – In his final college game, LIU Brooklyn point guard Jason Brickman became only the fourth men's player in Division I history to collect 1,000 career assists, finishing with 1,009. He also became only the second Division I men's player to average double figures in points and assists in the same season, after Avery Johnson of Southern in 1987–88.
- March 8 – Doug McDermott of Creighton became just the eighth Division I men's player to surpass 3,000 career points. He scored a career-high 45 points against Providence on Creighton's senior night to give him 3,011 at the time. He finished his career with 3,150, the fifth-most ever.
- March 9:
  - Wichita State beats Indiana State 83–69 in the final of the Missouri Valley Conference tournament in St. Louis, becoming the first Division I men's team to enter the NCAA tournament unbeaten since UNLV in 1991.
  - Coastal Carolina, led by head coach Cliff Ellis, beats Winthrop 76–61 in the final of the Big South Conference tournament. With the win, Ellis became just the 10th head coach to take four different schools to the NCAA tournament (he previously took South Alabama, Clemson, and Auburn).
- March 19 – East Carolina guard Akeem Richmond finished his career with 416 made three-pointers, good for sixth all-time in Division I history.

== Conference membership changes ==
The 2013–14 season saw the largest wave of membership changes resulting from a major realignment of NCAA Division I conferences. The cycle began in 2010 with the Big Ten and the then-Pac-10 publicly announcing their intentions to expand. The fallout from these conferences' moves later affected a majority of D-I conferences. The most significant developments this season were:

- The original Big East Conference split into football-sponsoring and non-football conferences. The non-football league now operates as the newly chartered Big East Conference, while the football-sponsoring league operates under the old charter as the renamed American Athletic Conference (The American).
- With The American adding four members in 2013 and three more in 2014, all from Conference USA (C-USA), the latter league responded by adding eight members in 2013, plus one more in 2014. Four of the 2013 C-USA arrivals came from the Sun Belt Conference, which itself added three schools in 2013 and two more in 2014.
- The Western Athletic Conference saw near-total replacement of its membership. Only three schools that had been members in the 2012–13 season—Idaho, New Mexico State, and Seattle—remained in the WAC for 2013–14, and Idaho left for the Big Sky Conference after this season. The WAC's attempts to replenish its membership led to the demise of the Great West Conference.

In addition, four schools began the transition up from Division II starting this season. These schools were ineligible for NCAA-sponsored postseason play until completing their D-I transitions in 2017.

School	Former conference	New conference
Abilene Christian Wildcats	Lone Star Conference (D-II)	Southland Conference
Boston University Terriers	America East Conference	Patriot League
Butler Bulldogs	Atlantic 10 Conference	Big East Conference
Charleston Cougars	Southern Conference	Colonial Athletic Association
Charlotte 49ers	Atlantic 10 Conference	Conference USA
Chicago State Cougars	Great West Conference	Western Athletic Conference
Cincinnati Bearcats	Original Big East Conference	American Athletic Conference ("The American")
UConn Huskies	Original Big East Conference	American Athletic Conference ("The American")
Creighton Bluejays	Missouri Valley Conference	Big East Conference
CSU Bakersfield Roadrunners	NCAA Division I independent	Western Athletic Conference
Denver Pioneers	Western Athletic Conference	The Summit League
DePaul Blue Demons	Original Big East Conference	Big East Conference
Florida Atlantic Owls	Sun Belt Conference	Conference USA
FIU Panthers	Sun Belt Conference	Conference USA
George Mason Patriots	Colonial Athletic Association	Atlantic 10
Georgetown Hoyas	Original Big East Conference	Big East Conference
Georgia State Panthers	Colonial Athletic Association	Sun Belt Conference
Grand Canyon Antelopes	Pacific West Conference (D-II)	Western Athletic Conference
Houston Cougars	Conference USA	American Athletic Conference ("The American")
Houston Baptist Huskies	Great West Conference	Southland Conference
Incarnate Word Cardinals	Lone Star Conference (D-II)	Southland Conference
Louisiana Tech Bulldogs	Western Athletic Conference	Conference USA
Louisville Cardinals	Original Big East Conference	American Athletic Conference ("The American")
Loyola Chicago Ramblers	Horizon League	Missouri Valley Conference
Loyola Maryland Greyhounds	Metro Atlantic Athletic Conference	Patriot League
Marquette Golden Eagles	Original Big East Conference	Big East Conference
Memphis Tigers	Conference USA	American Athletic Conference ("The American")
Middle Tennessee Blue Raiders	Sun Belt Conference	Conference USA
Monmouth Hawks	Northeast Conference	Metro Atlantic Athletic Conference
New Orleans Privateers	NCAA Division I independent	Southland Conference
NJIT Highlanders	Great West Conference	NCAA Division I independent
North Texas Mean Green	Sun Belt Conference	Conference USA
Notre Dame Fighting Irish	Original Big East Conference	Atlantic Coast Conference
Oakland Golden Grizzlies	The Summit League	Horizon League
Old Dominion Monarchs	Colonial Athletic Association	Conference USA
Pacific Tigers	Big West Conference	West Coast Conference
Pittsburgh Panthers	Original Big East Conference	Atlantic Coast Conference
Providence Friars	Original Big East Conference	Big East Conference
Quinnipiac Bobcats	Northeast Conference	Metro Atlantic Athletic Conference
Rutgers Scarlet Knights	Original Big East Conference	American Athletic Conference ("The American")
St. John's Red Storm	Original Big East Conference	Big East Conference
San Jose State Spartans	Western Athletic Conference	Mountain West Conference
Seton Hall Pirates	Original Big East Conference	Big East Conference
SMU Mustangs	Conference USA	American Athletic Conference ("The American")
South Florida Bulls	Original Big East Conference	American Athletic Conference ("The American")
Syracuse Orange	Original Big East Conference	Atlantic Coast Conference
Temple Owls	Atlantic 10 Conference	American Athletic Conference ("The American")
Texas–Arlington Mavericks	Western Athletic Conference	Sun Belt Conference
Texas State Bobcats	Western Athletic Conference	Sun Belt Conference
UCF Knights	Conference USA	American Athletic Conference ("The American")
UMass Lowell River Hawks	Northeast-10 Conference (D-II)	America East Conference
UMKC Kangaroos	The Summit League	Western Athletic Conference
Utah State Aggies	Western Athletic Conference	Mountain West Conference
Utah Valley Wolverines	Great West Conference	Western Athletic Conference
UTPA Broncs	Great West Conference	Western Athletic Conference
UTSA Roadrunners	Western Athletic Conference	Conference USA
Villanova Wildcats	Original Big East Conference	Big East Conference
Xavier Musketeers	Atlantic 10 Conference	Big East Conference

The 2013–14 season was also the last for several other teams in their current conferences:

- Four schools would leave the Southern Conference (SoCon). Appalachian State and Georgia Southern left for the Sun Belt, Davidson for the Atlantic 10, and Elon for the CAA.
- Three schools would join the SoCon, with East Tennessee State and Mercer moving from the Atlantic Sun Conference and VMI leaving the Big South Conference. Both ETSU and VMI were former SoCon members, having respectively left the league in 2005 and 2003.
- East Carolina, Tulane, and Tulsa would all leave C-USA for The American.
- As noted above, Idaho would leave the WAC and return its non-football sports to the Big Sky Conference (after an 18-year absence).
- Louisville and Rutgers would spend only one season in The American; they respectively left for the ACC and Big Ten.
- Maryland would leave the ACC for the Big Ten.
- Oral Roberts would leave the Southland to return to its previous conference home of The Summit.
- Western Kentucky would leave the Sun Belt for C-USA.

== New arenas ==
- The Nebraska Cornhuskers left their home since 1976, the on-campus Bob Devaney Sports Center, for the new Pinnacle Bank Arena in downtown Lincoln. The Cornhuskers played their first game in the arena on November 8 against the Florida Gulf Coast Eagles.
- The Towson Tigers also left a venue that they had occupied since 1976, the Towson Center. Unlike Nebraska, Towson is staying on campus in the new Tiger Arena.
- The four Division I newcomers all used existing on-campus venues:
  - Abilene Christian – Moody Coliseum
  - Grand Canyon – Grand Canyon University Arena
  - Incarnate Word – McDermott Convocation Center
  - UMass Lowell – The River Hawks' main basketball venue is Costello Athletic Center. Another on-campus venue, the Tsongas Center, normally home to the school's ice hockey team, is available for games requiring a larger capacity.

== Major rule changes ==
- Expanded the use of video review as follows:
  - Shot-clock violations and who caused the ball to go out-of-bounds in the final 2:00 of regulation or overtime.
  - Determine if a field goal is worth two points or three in the final 4:00 of regulation or in the entire overtime period. Any other such review must wait until the next media time-out (16:00, 12:00 and 8:00 as well as the final 4:00 of the first half).
- Change the block/charge rule to not permit a defender from sliding in front of an offensive player at the last second to draw a charge. The defender must be in position when the offensive player begins his upward flight with the ball.
- Increasing emphasis on hand-checking or extended arms on defense.
- Permit the use of video review to determine if an elbow delivered above the shoulders of an opponent warrants a flagrant-1 or -2 foul (as was previously the case), a player control foul, or no call.

== Season outlook ==
=== Pre-season polls ===
The top 25 from the AP and USA Today Coaches Polls.

'Associated Press'
Ranking	Team
1	Kentucky (27)
2	Michigan State (22)
3	Louisville (14)
4	Duke (2)
5	Kansas
6	Arizona
7	Michigan
8	Syracuse т Oklahoma State т
10	Florida
11	Ohio State
12	North Carolina
13	Memphis
14	VCU
15	Gonzaga
16	Wichita State
17	Marquette
18	UConn
19	Oregon
20	Wisconsin
21	Notre Dame
22	UCLA
23	New Mexico
24	Virginia
25	Baylor

USA Today Coaches
Ranking	Team
1	Kentucky (16)
2	Michigan State (3)
3	Louisville (10)
4	Duke (3)
5	Arizona
6	Kansas
7	Syracuse
8	Florida
9	Michigan
10	Ohio State
11	North Carolina
12	Oklahoma State
13	Memphis
14	Gonzaga
15	VCU
16	Wichita State
17	Marquette
18	Oregon
19	UConn
20	New Mexico
21	Wisconsin
22	Notre Dame
23	UCLA
24	Indiana
25	Virginia

== Regular season ==
=== Early-season tournaments ===
A number of early-season tournaments took place in November and December 2013.

Name	Dates	Location	No. teams	Champion
Rainbow Classic	November 8, 9, 11	Stan Sheriff Center (Honolulu, HI)	4 (RR)	Western Michigan
NIT Season Tip-Off	November 18–19, 27, 29	Madison Square Garden (New York)	16	Arizona
2K Sports Classic	November 21–22	Madison Square Garden (New York)	4*	UConn
Puerto Rico Tip-Off	November 21–22, 24	Roberto Clemente Coliseum (San Juan, PR)	8	Charlotte
Charleston Classic	November 21–22, 24	TD Arena (Charleston, South Carolina)	8	UMass
Coaches vs. Cancer Classic	November 22–23	Barclays Center (Brooklyn, New York)	4*	Michigan State
Paradise Jam tournament	November 22–25	Sports and Fitness Center (Saint Thomas, VI)	8	Maryland
Hall of Fame Tip Off	November 23–24	Mohegan Sun (Uncasville, Connecticut)	4	North Carolina
Portland State Tournament	November 23–25	Peter W. Stott Center (Portland, Oregon)	4 (RR)	Portland State
Corpus Christi Challenge	November 23–26, 29-30	American Bank Center (Corpus Christi, Texas)	4*	Virginia
CBE Hall of Fame Classic	November 25–26	Sprint Center (Kansas City, Missouri)	4*	Wichita State
Legends Classic	November 25–26	Barclays Center (Brooklyn, New York)	4*	Pittsburgh
Gulf Coast Showcase	November 25–27	Germain Arena (Estero, Florida)	8	Louisiana Tech
Maui Invitational tournament	November 25–27	Lahaina Civic Center (Lahaina, HI)	8	Syracuse
Cancún Challenge	November 26–27	Moon Palace Golf & Spa Resort (Cancún, MX)	8	Wisconsin
Great Alaska Shootout	November 27–30	Sullivan Arena (Anchorage, AK)	8	Harvard
Battle 4 Atlantis	November 28–30	Imperial Arena (Nassau, BAH)	8	Villanova
Old Spice Classic	November 28 – December 1	HP Field House (Lake Buena Vista, Florida)	8	Memphis
Wooden Legacy	November 28 – December 1	Anaheim Convention Center (Anaheim, California)	8	San Diego State
Las Vegas Invitational	November 29–30	Orleans Arena (Las Vegas)	4*	UCLA
Barclays Center Classic	November 29–30	Barclays Center (Brooklyn, New York)	4*	Ole Miss
Las Vegas Classic	December 22–23	Orleans Arena (Las Vegas)	4*	UNLV
Diamond Head Classic	December 22–23, 25	Stan Sheriff Center (Honolulu, HI)	8	Iowa State

*Although these tournaments included more teams, only the number listed played for the championship.

=== Conferences ===
==== Conference winners and tournaments ====
Thirty-one conference seasons concluded with a single-elimination tournament. The teams in each conference that won their regular-season titles were given the number one seed in their respective conference tournaments. Conference tournament winners received an automatic bid to the 2014 NCAA Division I men's basketball tournament. The Ivy League was the only NCAA Division I conference that did not hold a conference tournament, instead sending its regular-season champion to the NCAA tournament.

Conference	Regular season winner	Conference player of the year	Conference Coach of the Year	Conference tournament	Tournament venue (city)	Tournament winner
America East Conference	Vermont	Jameel Warney, Stony Brook	John Becker, Vermont	2014 America East men's basketball tournament	SEFCU Arena (Guilderland, New York); Final at campus site	Albany
American Athletic Conference	Cincinnati & Louisville	Shabazz Napier, UConn	Mick Cronin, Cincinnati	2014 American Athletic Conference men's basketball tournament	FedExForum (Memphis, TN)	Louisville
Atlantic 10 Conference	Saint Louis	Jordair Jett, Saint Louis	Jim Crews, Saint Louis	2014 Atlantic 10 men's basketball tournament	Barclays Center (Brooklyn, New York)	St. Joseph's
Atlantic Coast Conference	Virginia	T. J. Warren, NC State	Tony Bennett, Virginia	2014 ACC men's basketball tournament	Greensboro Coliseum; Greensboro, North Carolina	Virginia
Atlantic Sun Conference	Mercer & Florida Gulf Coast	Langston Hall, Mercer	Bob Hoffman, Mercer	2014 Atlantic Sun men's basketball tournament	Campus sites	Mercer
Big 12 Conference	Kansas	Melvin Ejim, Iowa State	Rick Barnes, Texas	2014 Big 12 men's basketball tournament	Sprint Center (Kansas City, Missouri)	Iowa State
Big East Conference	Villanova	Doug McDermott, Creighton	Jay Wright, Villanova	2014 Big East men's basketball tournament	Madison Square Garden (New York City)	Providence
Big Sky Conference	Weber State	Davion Berry, Weber State	Randy Rahe, Weber State	2014 Big Sky Conference men's basketball tournament	At regular season champion	Weber State
Big South Conference	High Point (North); Coastal Carolina (South)	John Brown, High Point	Scott Cherry, High Point	2014 Big South Conference men's basketball tournament	HTC Center (Conway, South Carolina)	Coastal Carolina
Big Ten Conference	Michigan	Nik Stauskas, Michigan	Tim Miles, Nebraska (Coaches); John Beilein, Michigan (Media)	2014 Big Ten Conference men's basketball tournament	Bankers Life Fieldhouse (Indianapolis)	Michigan State
Big West Conference	UC Irvine	Alan Williams, UC Santa Barbara	Russell Turner, UC Irvine	2014 Big West Conference men's basketball tournament	Honda Center (Anaheim, California)	Cal Poly
Colonial Athletic Association	Delaware	Jerrelle Benimon, Towson	Monté Ross, Delaware	2014 CAA men's basketball tournament	Baltimore Arena (Baltimore)	Delaware
Conference USA	Southern Miss, Louisiana Tech, Middle Tennessee & Tulsa	Shawn Jones, Middle Tennessee	Danny Manning, Tulsa	2014 Conference USA men's basketball tournament	Don Haskins Center (El Paso, Texas)	Tulsa
Horizon League	Green Bay	Keifer Sykes, Green Bay	Brian Wardle, Green Bay	2014 Horizon League men's basketball tournament	First round at campus sites Quarterfinals and semifinals at top seed Final at top remaining seed	Milwaukee
Ivy League	Harvard	Wesley Saunders, Harvard	Does not present this award	No tournament		
Metro Atlantic Athletic Conference	Iona	Billy Baron, Canisius	Tim Cluess, Iona	2014 MAAC men's basketball tournament	MassMutual Center (Springfield, Massachusetts)	Manhattan
Mid-American Conference	Buffalo (East); Toledo & Western Michigan (West)	Javon McCrea, Buffalo	Steve Hawkins, Western Michigan	2014 Mid-American Conference men's basketball tournament	First round at campus sites Remainder at Quicken Loans Arena (Cleveland)	Western Michigan
Mid-Eastern Athletic Conference	North Carolina Central	Jeremy Ingram, North Carolina Central	LeVelle Moton, North Carolina Central	2014 MEAC men's basketball tournament	Norfolk Scope (Norfolk, Virginia)	North Carolina Central
Missouri Valley Conference	Wichita State	Fred VanVleet, Wichita State	Gregg Marshall, Wichita State	2014 Missouri Valley Conference men's basketball tournament	Scottrade Center (St. Louis, Missouri)	Wichita State
Mountain West Conference	San Diego State	Xavier Thames, San Diego State	Steve Fisher, San Diego State	2014 Mountain West Conference men's basketball tournament	Thomas & Mack Center (Paradise, Nevada)	New Mexico
Northeast Conference	Robert Morris	Karvel Anderson, Robert Morris	Andy Toole, Robert Morris	2014 Northeast Conference men's basketball tournament	Campus sites	Mount St. Mary's
Ohio Valley Conference	Belmont (East); Murray State (West)	J. J. Mann, Belmont	Rick Byrd, Belmont	2014 Ohio Valley Conference men's basketball tournament	Nashville Municipal Auditorium (Nashville, Tennessee)	Eastern Kentucky
Pac-12 Conference	Arizona	Nick Johnson, Arizona	Sean Miller, Arizona	2014 Pac-12 Conference men's basketball tournament	MGM Grand Garden Arena (Paradise, Nevada)	UCLA
Patriot League	Boston University	Cameron Ayers, Bucknell	Mike Brennan, American	2014 Patriot League men's basketball tournament	Campus sites	American
Southeastern Conference	Florida	Scottie Wilbekin, Florida	Billy Donovan, Florida	2014 SEC men's basketball tournament	Georgia Dome (Atlanta)	Florida
Southern Conference	Davidson	De'Mon Brooks, Davidson	Mike Young, Wofford (Coaches) & Will Wade, Chattanooga (Media)	2014 Southern Conference men's basketball tournament	U.S. Cellular Center (Asheville, North Carolina)	Wofford
Southland Conference	Stephen F. Austin	Jacob Parker, Stephen F. Austin	Brad Underwood, Stephen F. Austin	2014 Southland Conference men's basketball tournament	Leonard E. Merrell Center (Katy, Texas)	Stephen F. Austin
Southwestern Athletic Conference	Southern	Aaric Murray, Texas Southern	Roman Banks, Southern	2014 SWAC men's basketball tournament	Toyota Center (Houston)	Texas Southern
The Summit League	North Dakota State	Taylor Braun, North Dakota State	Saul Phillips, North Dakota State	2014 The Summit League men's basketball tournament	Sioux Falls Arena (Sioux Falls, South Dakota)	North Dakota State
Sun Belt Conference	Georgia State	R. J. Hunter, Georgia State	Ron Hunter, Georgia State	2014 Sun Belt Conference men's basketball tournament	Lakefront Arena (New Orleans)	Louisiana–Lafayette
West Coast Conference	Gonzaga	Tyler Haws, BYU	Rex Walters, San Francisco	2014 West Coast Conference men's basketball tournament	Orleans Arena (Paradise, Nevada)	Gonzaga
Western Athletic Conference	Utah Valley	Daniel Mullings, New Mexico State	Dick Hunsaker, Utah Valley	2014 WAC men's basketball tournament	Orleans Arena (Paradise, Nevada)	New Mexico State

==== Conference standings ====
2013–14 America East Conference men's basketball standings
	Conf.				Overall
Team	W		L	PCT	W		L	PCT
Vermont	15	–	1	.938	22	–	11	.667
Stony Brook	13	–	3	.813	23	–	11	.676
Hartford	10	–	6	.625	17	–	16	.515
Albany †	9	–	7	.563	19	–	15	.559
UMass Lowell*	8	–	8	.500	10	–	18	.357
UMBC	5	–	11	.313	9	–	21	.300
Binghamton	4	–	12	.250	7	–	23	.233
Maine	4	–	12	.250	6	–	23	.207
New Hampshire	4	–	12	.250	6	–	24	.200
† 2014 America East tournament winner Rankings from AP poll *ineligible for postseason play due to Div. I transition

2013–14 American Athletic Conference men's basketball standings
	Conf.				Overall
Team	W		L	PCT	W		L	PCT
No. 5 Louisville* †	15	–	3	.833	31	–	6	.838
No. 15 Cincinnati	15	–	3	.833	27	–	7	.794
No. 18 UConn	12	–	6	.667	32	–	8	.800
SMU	12	–	6	.667	27	–	10	.730
Memphis	12	–	6	.667	24	–	10	.706
Houston	8	–	10	.444	17	–	16	.515
Rutgers	5	–	13	.278	12	–	21	.364
UCF	4	–	14	.222	13	–	18	.419
Temple	4	–	14	.222	9	–	22	.290
South Florida	3	–	15	.167	12	–	20	.375
† The American Tournament winner As of March 15, 2014; *Louisville: 29 reg. season games, 3 postseason games vacated due to sanctions against the program; Disputed Record-(31-6)(15-3); Rankings from AP poll

2013–14 Atlantic 10 men's basketball standings
	Conf.				Overall
Team	W		L	PCT	W		L	PCT
No. 25 Saint Louis	13	–	3	.813	27	–	7	.794
No. 24 VCU	12	–	4	.750	26	–	9	.743
George Washington	11	–	5	.688	24	–	9	.727
Saint Joseph's †	11	–	5	.688	24	–	10	.706
UMass	10	–	6	.625	24	–	9	.727
Dayton	10	–	6	.625	26	–	11	.703
Richmond	8	–	8	.500	19	–	14	.576
La Salle	7	–	9	.438	15	–	16	.484
St. Bonaventure	6	–	10	.375	18	–	15	.545
Rhode Island	5	–	11	.313	14	–	18	.438
Duquesne	5	–	11	.313	13	–	17	.433
George Mason	4	–	12	.250	11	–	20	.355
Fordham	2	–	14	.125	10	–	21	.323
† 2014 A10 Tournament winner Rankings from AP poll

2013–14 ACC men's basketball standings
	Conf.				Overall
Team	W		L	PCT	W		L	PCT
No. 3 Virginia †	16	–	2	.889	30	–	7	.811
No. 14 Syracuse	14	–	4	.778	28	–	6	.824
No. 8 Duke	13	–	5	.722	26	–	9	.743
No. 19 North Carolina	13	–	5	.722	24	–	10	.706
Pittsburgh	11	–	7	.611	26	–	10	.722
Clemson	10	–	8	.556	23	–	13	.639
NC State	9	–	9	.500	22	–	14	.611
Maryland	9	–	9	.500	17	–	15	.531
Florida State	9	–	9	.500	22	–	14	.611
Miami (FL)	7	–	11	.389	17	–	16	.515
Wake Forest	6	–	12	.333	17	–	16	.515
Georgia Tech	6	–	12	.333	16	–	17	.485
Notre Dame	6	–	12	.333	15	–	17	.469
Boston College	4	–	14	.222	8	–	24	.250
Virginia Tech	2	–	16	.111	9	–	22	.290
† 2014 ACC tournament winner Rankings from AP poll

2013–14 Atlantic Sun men's basketball standings
	Conf.				Overall
Team	W		L	PCT	W		L	PCT
Mercer †	14	–	4	.778	27	–	9	.750
Florida Gulf Coast	14	–	4	.778	22	–	13	.629
USC Upstate	11	–	7	.611	19	–	15	.559
East Tennessee State	10	–	8	.556	19	–	16	.543
Lipscomb	10	–	8	.556	15	–	15	.500
North Florida	10	–	8	.556	16	–	16	.500
Jacksonville	8	–	10	.444	12	–	18	.400
Northern Kentucky*	5	–	13	.278	9	–	21	.300
Stetson	5	–	13	.278	7	–	24	.226
Kennesaw State	3	–	15	.167	6	–	25	.194
† 2014 Atlantic Sun Tournament winner Rankings from AP poll *Ineligible for postseason play due to Div. I transition

2013–14 Big East men's basketball standings
	Conf.				Overall
Team	W		L	PCT	W		L	PCT
No. 6 Villanova	16	–	2	.889	29	–	5	.853
No. 16 Creighton	14	–	4	.778	27	–	8	.771
Providence †	10	–	8	.556	23	–	12	.657
Xavier	10	–	8	.556	21	–	13	.618
St. John's	10	–	8	.556	20	–	13	.606
Marquette	9	–	9	.500	17	–	15	.531
Georgetown	8	–	10	.444	18	–	15	.545
Seton Hall	6	–	12	.333	17	–	17	.500
Butler	4	–	14	.222	14	–	17	.452
DePaul	3	–	15	.167	12	–	21	.364
† 2014 Big East tournament winner Rankings from AP poll Source:

2013–14 Big Sky men's basketball standings
	Conf.				Overall
Team	W		L	PCT	W		L	PCT
Weber State †	14	–	6	.700	19	–	12	.613
Montana	12	–	8	.600	17	–	13	.567
North Dakota	12	–	8	.600	17	–	17	.500
Northern Arizona	12	–	8	.600	15	–	17	.469
Northern Colorado	11	–	9	.550	18	–	14	.563
Portland State	11	–	9	.550	17	–	15	.531
Eastern Washington	10	–	10	.500	15	–	16	.484
Sacramento State	10	–	10	.500	14	–	16	.467
Montana State	9	–	11	.450	14	–	17	.452
Idaho State	8	–	12	.400	11	–	18	.379
Southern Utah	1	–	19	.050	2	–	27	.069
† Conference tournament winner

2013–14 Big South men's basketball standings
	Conf.				Overall
Team	W		L	PCT	W		L	PCT
North
High Point	12	–	4	.750	16	–	15	.516
VMI	11	–	5	.688	22	–	13	.629
Radford	10	–	6	.625	22	–	13	.629
Campbell	6	–	10	.375	12	–	20	.375
Liberty	5	–	11	.313	11	–	21	.344
Longwood	3	–	13	.188	8	–	24	.250
South
Coastal Carolina †	11	–	5	.688	21	–	13	.618
Winthrop	10	–	6	.625	20	–	13	.606
Gardner–Webb	10	–	6	.625	18	–	15	.545
UNC Asheville	10	–	6	.625	17	–	15	.531
Charleston Southern	6	–	10	.375	13	–	18	.419
Presbyterian	2	–	14	.125	6	–	26	.188
† 2014 Big South tournament winner

2013–14 Big Ten Conference men's basketball standings
	Conf.				Overall
Team	W		L	PCT	W		L	PCT
No. 7 Michigan	15	–	3	.833	28	–	9	.757
No. 12 Wisconsin	12	–	6	.667	30	–	8	.789
No. 11 Michigan State†	12	–	6	.667	29	–	9	.763
Nebraska	11	–	7	.611	19	–	13	.594
No. 22 Ohio State	10	–	8	.556	25	–	10	.714
Iowa	9	–	9	.500	20	–	13	.606
Minnesota	8	–	10	.444	25	–	13	.658
Illinois	7	–	11	.389	20	–	15	.571
Indiana	7	–	11	.389	17	–	15	.531
Penn State	6	–	12	.333	16	–	18	.471
Northwestern	6	–	12	.333	14	–	19	.424
Purdue	5	–	13	.278	15	–	17	.469
† 2014 Big Ten tournament winner Rankings from AP poll

2013–14 Big 12 men's basketball standings
	Conf.				Overall
Team	W		L	PCT	W		L	PCT
No. 10 Kansas	14	–	4	.778	25	–	10	.714
No. 21 Oklahoma	12	–	6	.667	23	–	10	.697
Texas	11	–	7	.611	24	–	11	.686
No. 9 Iowa State †	11	–	7	.611	28	–	8	.778
Kansas State	10	–	8	.556	20	–	13	.606
West Virginia	9	–	9	.500	17	–	16	.515
No. 23 Baylor	9	–	9	.500	26	–	12	.684
Oklahoma State	8	–	10	.444	21	–	13	.618
Texas Tech	6	–	12	.333	14	–	18	.438
TCU	0	–	18	.000	9	–	22	.290
† 2014 Big 12 Tournament winner Rankings from AP poll

2013–14 Big West men's basketball standings
	Conf.				Overall
Team	W		L	PCT	W		L	PCT
UC Irvine	13	–	3	.813	23	–	12	.657
UC Santa Barbara	12	–	4	.750	21	–	9	.700
Long Beach State	10	–	6	.625	15	–	17	.469
Hawai'i	9	–	7	.563	20	–	11	.645
Cal State Northridge	7	–	9	.438	17	–	18	.486
Cal Poly †	6	–	10	.375	14	–	20	.412
Cal State Fullerton	6	–	10	.375	11	–	20	.355
UC Riverside	5	–	11	.313	10	–	21	.323
UC Davis	4	–	12	.250	9	–	22	.290
† 2014 Big West tournament winner

2013–14 CAA men's basketball standings
	Conf.				Overall
Team	W		L	PCT	W		L	PCT
Delaware †	14	–	2	.875	25	–	10	.714
Towson	13	–	3	.813	25	–	11	.694
William & Mary	10	–	6	.625	20	–	12	.625
Drexel	8	–	8	.500	16	–	14	.533
Northeastern	7	–	9	.438	11	–	21	.344
College of Charleston	6	–	10	.375	14	–	18	.438
James Madison	6	–	10	.375	11	–	20	.355
Hofstra	5	–	11	.313	10	–	23	.303
UNC Wilmington	3	–	13	.188	9	–	23	.281
† 2014 CAA tournament winner Rankings from AP poll

2013–14 Conference USA men's basketball standings
	Conf.				Overall
Team	W		L	PCT	W		L	PCT
Louisiana Tech	13	–	3	.813	29	–	8	.784
Tulsa †	13	–	3	.813	21	–	13	.618
Middle Tennessee	13	–	3	.813	24	–	9	.727
Southern Miss	13	–	3	.813	29	–	7	.806
UTEP	12	–	4	.750	23	–	11	.676
Old Dominion	9	–	7	.563	18	–	18	.500
Tulane	8	–	8	.500	17	–	17	.500
UAB	7	–	9	.438	18	–	13	.581
Charlotte	7	–	9	.438	17	–	14	.548
FIU*	7	–	9	.438	15	–	16	.484
North Texas	6	–	10	.375	16	–	16	.500
Florida Atlantic	5	–	11	.313	10	–	22	.313
East Carolina	5	–	11	.313	17	–	17	.500
UTSA	4	–	12	.250	8	–	22	.267
Marshall	4	–	12	.250	11	–	22	.333
Rice	2	–	14	.125	7	–	23	.233
† 2014 C-USA Tournament winner Rankings from AP poll *Ineligible for postseason play due to APR penalties

2013–14 Horizon League men's basketball standings
	Conf.				Overall
Team	W		L	PCT	W		L	PCT
Green Bay	14	–	2	.875	24	–	7	.774
Cleveland State	12	–	4	.750	21	–	12	.636
Wright State	10	–	6	.625	21	–	15	.583
Valparaiso	9	–	7	.563	18	–	16	.529
Milwaukee †	7	–	9	.438	21	–	14	.600
Oakland	7	–	9	.438	13	–	20	.394
Youngstown State	6	–	10	.375	15	–	17	.469
Detroit	6	–	10	.375	13	–	19	.406
UIC	1	–	15	.063	6	–	25	.194
† 2014 Horizon League Tournament winner

2013–14 Ivy League men's basketball standings
	Conf.				Overall
Team	W		L	PCT	W		L	PCT
x-Harvard	13	–	1	.929	27	–	5	.844
Yale	9	–	5	.643	19	–	14	.576
Princeton	8	–	6	.571	21	–	9	.700
Columbia	8	–	6	.571	21	–	13	.618
Brown	7	–	7	.500	15	–	14	.517
Dartmouth	5	–	9	.357	12	–	16	.429
Penn	5	–	9	.357	8	–	20	.286
Cornell	1	–	13	.071	2	–	26	.071
Rankings from AP Poll x-Ivy League champion

2013–14 MAAC men's basketball standings
	Conf.				Overall
Team	W		L	PCT	W		L	PCT
Iona	17	–	3	.850	22	–	11	.667
Manhattan †	15	–	5	.750	25	–	8	.758
Quinnipiac	14	–	6	.700	20	–	12	.625
Canisius	14	–	6	.700	21	–	13	.618
Siena	11	–	9	.550	20	–	18	.526
Saint Peter's	9	–	11	.450	14	–	17	.452
Rider	9	–	11	.450	14	–	17	.452
Marist	9	–	11	.450	12	–	19	.387
Monmouth	5	–	15	.250	11	–	21	.344
Fairfield	4	–	16	.200	7	–	25	.219
Niagara	3	–	17	.150	7	–	26	.212
† 2014 MAAC tournament winner

2013–14 Mid-American Conference men's basketball standings
	Conf.				Overall
Team	W		L	PCT	W		L	PCT
East
Buffalo	13	–	5	.722	19	–	10	.655
Akron	12	–	6	.667	21	–	13	.618
Ohio	11	–	7	.611	25	–	12	.676
Miami	8	–	10	.444	13	–	18	.419
Kent State	7	–	11	.389	16	–	16	.500
Bowling Green	6	–	12	.333	12	–	20	.375
West
Toledo	14	–	4	.778	27	–	7	.794
Western Michigan †	14	–	4	.778	23	–	10	.697
Eastern Michigan	10	–	8	.556	22	–	15	.595
Northern Illinois	8	–	10	.444	15	–	17	.469
Central Michigan	3	–	15	.167	10	–	21	.323
Ball State	2	–	16	.111	5	–	25	.167
† 2014 MAC tournament winner

2013–14 MEAC men's basketball standings
	Conf.				Overall
Team	W		L	PCT	W		L	PCT
North Carolina Central †	15	–	1	.938	28	–	6	.824
Hampton	13	–	3	.813	18	–	13	.581
Norfolk State	11	–	5	.688	19	–	15	.559
Morgan State	11	–	5	.688	15	–	16	.484
Savannah State	10	–	6	.625	13	–	19	.406
Florida A&M	8	–	8	.500	14	–	18	.438
Coppin State	7	–	9	.438	12	–	20	.375
Delaware State	5	–	11	.313	9	–	21	.300
South Carolina State	5	–	11	.313	9	–	21	.300
North Carolina A&T	5	–	11	.313	9	–	23	.281
Howard	5	–	11	.313	8	–	25	.242
Bethune–Cookman	5	–	11	.313	7	–	25	.219
Maryland Eastern Shore	4	–	12	.250	6	–	24	.200
† 2014 MEAC tournament winner

2013–14 Missouri Valley Conference men's basketball standings
	Conf.				Overall
Team	W		L	PCT	W		L	PCT
No. 2 Wichita State †	18	–	0	1.000	35	–	1	.972
Indiana State	12	–	6	.667	23	–	11	.676
Northern Iowa	10	–	8	.556	16	–	15	.516
Missouri State	9	–	9	.500	20	–	13	.606
Illinois State	9	–	9	.500	18	–	16	.529
Southern Illinois	9	–	9	.500	14	–	19	.424
Bradley	7	–	11	.389	12	–	20	.375
Drake	6	–	12	.333	15	–	16	.484
Evansville	6	–	12	.333	14	–	19	.424
Loyola Chicago	4	–	14	.222	10	–	22	.313
† 2014 MVC tournament winner Rankings from AP poll

2013–14 Mountain West Conference men's basketball standings
	Conf.				Overall
Team	W		L	PCT	W		L	PCT
No. 13 San Diego State	16	–	2	.889	31	–	5	.861
No. 17 New Mexico †	15	–	3	.833	27	–	7	.794
UNLV	10	–	8	.556	20	–	13	.606
Nevada	10	–	8	.556	15	–	17	.469
Boise State	9	–	9	.500	21	–	13	.618
Wyoming	9	–	9	.500	18	–	15	.545
Fresno State	9	–	9	.500	21	–	18	.538
Utah State	7	–	11	.389	18	–	14	.563
Colorado State	7	–	11	.389	16	–	16	.500
Air Force	6	–	12	.333	12	–	18	.400
San Jose State	1	–	17	.056	7	–	24	.226
† 2014 MWC tournament winner Rankings from AP poll

2013–14 Northeast Conference men's basketball standings
	Conf.				Overall
Team	W		L	PCT	W		L	PCT
Robert Morris	14	–	2	.875	22	–	14	.611
Wagner	12	–	4	.750	19	–	12	.613
Bryant	10	–	6	.625	18	–	14	.563
St. Francis Brooklyn	9	–	7	.563	18	–	14	.563
Mount St. Mary's †	9	–	7	.563	16	–	17	.485
Central Connecticut	7	–	9	.438	11	–	19	.367
Saint Francis	7	–	9	.438	10	–	21	.323
Fairleigh Dickinson	6	–	10	.375	10	–	21	.323
LIU Brooklyn	4	–	12	.250	9	–	20	.310
Sacred Heart	2	–	14	.125	5	–	26	.161
† 2014 NEC tournament winner

2013–14 Ohio Valley Conference men's basketball standings
	Conf.				Overall
Team	W		L	PCT	W		L	PCT
East
Belmont	14	–	2	.875	26	–	10	.722
Eastern Kentucky †	11	–	5	.688	24	–	10	.706
Morehead State	10	–	6	.625	20	–	14	.588
Tennessee Tech	9	–	7	.563	17	–	16	.515
Jacksonville State	4	–	12	.250	10	–	21	.323
Tennessee State	4	–	12	.250	5	–	25	.167
West
Murray State	13	–	3	.813	23	–	11	.676
Southeast Missouri State	8	–	8	.500	18	–	14	.563
Eastern Illinois	7	–	9	.438	11	–	19	.367
SIU Edwardsville	7	–	9	.438	11	–	20	.355
Austin Peay	6	–	10	.375	12	–	18	.400
UT Martin	3	–	13	.188	8	–	23	.258
† 2014 OVC tournament winner Rankings from AP poll

2013–14 Pac-12 Conference men's basketball standings
	Conf.				Overall
Team	W		L	PCT	W		L	PCT
No. 4 Arizona	15	–	3	.833	33	–	5	.868
No. 20 UCLA †	12	–	6	.667	28	–	9	.757
Oregon	10	–	8	.556	24	–	10	.706
Colorado	10	–	8	.556	23	–	12	.657
Arizona State	10	–	8	.556	21	–	12	.636
Stanford	10	–	8	.556	23	–	13	.639
California	10	–	8	.556	21	–	14	.600
Utah	9	–	9	.500	21	–	12	.636
Washington	9	–	9	.500	17	–	15	.531
Oregon State	8	–	10	.444	16	–	16	.500
Washington State	3	–	15	.167	10	–	21	.323
USC	2	–	16	.111	11	–	21	.344
† Conference tournament winner Rankings from AP poll

2013–14 Patriot League men's basketball standings
	Conf.				Overall
Team	W		L	PCT	W		L	PCT
Boston University	15	–	3	.833	24	–	11	.686
American †	13	–	5	.722	20	–	13	.606
Holy Cross	12	–	6	.667	20	–	14	.588
Bucknell	11	–	7	.611	16	–	14	.533
Army	10	–	8	.556	15	–	16	.484
Lehigh	7	–	11	.389	14	–	18	.438
Colgate	6	–	12	.333	13	–	18	.419
Loyola (MD)	6	–	12	.333	11	–	19	.367
Lafayette	6	–	12	.333	11	–	20	.355
Navy	4	–	14	.222	9	–	21	.300
† 2014 Patriot League tournament winner

2013–14 Southeastern Conference men's basketball standings
	Conf.				Overall
Team	W		L	PCT	W		L	PCT
No. 1 Florida †	18	–	0	1.000	36	–	3	.923
Kentucky	12	–	6	.667	29	–	11	.725
Georgia	12	–	6	.667	20	–	14	.588
Tennessee	11	–	7	.611	24	–	13	.649
Arkansas	10	–	8	.556	22	–	12	.647
Missouri	9	–	9	.500	23	–	12	.657
LSU	9	–	9	.500	20	–	14	.588
Ole Miss	9	–	9	.500	19	–	14	.576
Texas A&M	8	–	10	.444	18	–	16	.529
Vanderbilt	7	–	11	.389	15	–	16	.484
Alabama	7	–	11	.389	13	–	19	.406
Auburn	6	–	12	.333	14	–	16	.467
South Carolina	5	–	13	.278	14	–	20	.412
Mississippi State	3	–	15	.167	14	–	19	.424
† 2014 SEC tournament winner Rankings from AP poll

2013–14 Southern Conference men's basketball standings
	Conf.				Overall
Team	W		L	PCT	W		L	PCT
Davidson	15	–	1	.938	20	–	13	.606
Chattanooga	12	–	4	.750	18	–	15	.545
Wofford †	11	–	5	.688	20	–	13	.606
Elon	11	–	5	.688	18	–	14	.563
Western Carolina	10	–	6	.625	19	–	15	.559
UNC Greensboro	7	–	9	.438	14	–	18	.438
Georgia Southern	6	–	10	.375	15	–	19	.441
Samford	6	–	10	.375	13	–	20	.394
Appalachian State	5	–	11	.313	9	–	21	.300
Furman	3	–	13	.188	9	–	21	.300
The Citadel	2	–	14	.125	7	–	26	.212
† 2014 SoCon Tournament winner

2013–14 Southland Conference men's basketball standings
	Conf.				Overall
Team	W		L	PCT	W		L	PCT
Stephen F. Austin †	18	–	0	1.000	32	–	3	.914
Texas A&M–CC	14	–	4	.778	18	–	16	.529
Sam Houston State	13	–	5	.722	24	–	11	.686
Northwestern State	12	–	6	.667	17	–	14	.548
Incarnate Word*	9	–	5	.643	21	–	6	.778
Oral Roberts	10	–	8	.556	17	–	16	.515
Nicholls State	10	–	8	.556	14	–	15	.483
McNeese State	9	–	9	.500	11	–	20	.355
New Orleans**	8	–	10	.444	11	–	15	.423
Southeastern Louisiana	7	–	11	.389	12	–	18	.400
Central Arkansas	5	–	13	.278	8	–	21	.276
Lamar	3	–	15	.167	4	–	26	.133
Abilene Christian*	2	–	12	.143	11	–	20	.355
Houston Baptist	2	–	16	.111	6	–	25	.194
† 2014 Southland tournament winner Rankings from AP poll *ineligible for postseason play due to Div. I transition **ineligible for postseason play due to APR penalties

2013–14 SWAC men's basketball standings
	Conf.				Overall
Team	W		L	PCT	W		L	PCT
Southern*	15	–	3	.833	19	–	13	.594
Texas Southern †	12	–	6	.667	19	–	15	.559
Alabama State	12	–	6	.667	19	–	13	.594
Arkansas–Pine Bluff*	11	–	7	.611	13	–	18	.419
Alabama A&M	10	–	8	.556	14	–	16	.467
Alcorn State**	9	–	9	.500	12	–	19	.387
Jackson State	7	–	11	.389	11	–	20	.355
Prairie View A&M	6	–	12	.333	11	–	23	.324
Mississippi Valley State*	5	–	13	.278	9	–	23	.281
Grambling State*	3	–	15	.167	5	–	24	.172
† 2014 SWAC tournament winner Rankings from AP poll *ineligible for postseason play due to APR penalties **Handed a L1 APR penalty, but eligible for postseason

2013–14 Summit League men's basketball standings
	Conf.				Overall
Team	W		L	PCT	W		L	PCT
North Dakota State †	12	–	2	.857	26	–	7	.788
IPFW	10	–	4	.714	25	–	11	.694
South Dakota State	10	–	4	.714	19	–	13	.594
Denver	8	–	6	.571	16	–	15	.516
South Dakota	6	–	8	.429	12	–	18	.400
Omaha *	5	–	9	.357	17	–	15	.531
Western Illinois	4	–	10	.286	10	–	20	.333
IUPUI	1	–	13	.071	6	–	26	.188
† 2014 Summit League tournament winner Rankings from AP poll *ineligible for NCAA postseason Div. I tournament due to Div. I transition

2013–14 Sun Belt Conference men's basketball standings
	Conf.				Overall
Team	W		L	PCT	W		L	PCT
Georgia State	17	–	1	.944	25	–	9	.735
WKU	12	–	6	.667	21	–	11	.656
Louisiana–Lafayette †	11	–	7	.611	23	–	12	.657
Arkansas State	10	–	8	.556	19	–	13	.594
Arkansas–Little Rock	9	–	9	.500	15	–	17	.469
Texas–Arlington	9	–	9	.500	15	–	17	.469
Louisiana–Monroe	7	–	11	.389	10	–	17	.370
Troy	6	–	12	.333	11	–	20	.355
South Alabama	5	–	13	.278	11	–	20	.355
Texas State	4	–	14	.222	8	–	23	.258
† 2014 Sun Belt Conference tournament winner

2013–14 West Coast Conference men's basketball standings
	Conf.				Overall
Team	W		L	PCT	W		L	PCT
Gonzaga †	15	–	3	.833	29	–	7	.806
BYU	13	–	5	.722	23	–	12	.657
San Francisco	13	–	5	.722	21	–	12	.636
Saint Mary's	11	–	7	.611	23	–	12	.657
Pepperdine	8	–	10	.444	15	–	16	.484
San Diego	7	–	11	.389	18	–	17	.514
Portland	7	–	11	.389	15	–	16	.484
Pacific	6	–	12	.333	18	–	16	.529
Santa Clara	6	–	12	.333	14	–	19	.424
Loyola Marymount	4	–	14	.222	13	–	19	.406
† Conference tournament winner

2013–14 WAC men's basketball standings
	Conf.				Overall
Team	W		L	PCT	W		L	PCT
Utah Valley	13	–	3	.813	20	–	12	.625
New Mexico State †	12	–	4	.750	26	–	10	.722
Grand Canyon *	10	–	6	.625	15	–	15	.500
Chicago State	8	–	8	.500	13	–	19	.406
UMKC	7	–	9	.438	10	–	20	.333
Idaho	7	–	9	.438	16	–	17	.485
Cal State Bakersfield	5	–	11	.313	13	–	19	.406
Seattle	5	–	11	.313	13	–	17	.433
Texas–Pan American	5	–	11	.313	9	–	23	.281
† 2014 WAC tournament winner Rankings from AP poll * ineligible for postseason tournament as part of reclassification from NCAA Division II

=== Division I independents ===
One school played as a Division I independent.

2013–14 NCAA Division I men's basketball independents standings
	Conf.				Overall
Team	W		L	PCT	W		L	PCT
NJIT		–		–	13	–	16	.448

=== Informal championships ===
Conference	Regular season winner	Most Valuable Player
Philadelphia Big 5	Villanova	James Bell, Villanova

Villanova finished with a 4–0 record in head-to-head competition among the Philadelphia Big 5.

=== Statistical leaders ===
Source for additional stats categories

Points per game			Rebounds per game			Assists per game			Steals per game		
Player	School	PPG	Player	School	RPG	Player	School	APG	Player	School	SPG
Doug McDermott	Creighton	26.7	Alan Williams	UC Santa Barbara	11.5	Jason Brickman	LIU Brooklyn	10.0	Brianté Weber	VCU	3.46
Antoine Mason	Niagara	25.6	Jerrelle Benimon	Towson	11.2	Speedy Smith	Louisiana Tech	7.9	Duke Mondy	Oakland	3.10
T. J. Warren	NC State	24.9	Joel Bolomboy	Weber State	11.0	Maurice Watson Jr.	Boston University	7.1	Marcus Smart	Oklahoma St.	2.87
Billy Baron	Canisius	24.1	Chad Posthumus	Morehead St.	10.9	Chaz Williams	UMass	6.9	Tevin Hammond	Arkansas–Pine Bluff	2.68
Patrick Miller	Tennessee St.	23.7	Roscoe Smith	UNLV	10.9	Lucas Woodhouse	Longwood	6.7	Fuquan Edwin	Seton Hall	2.66

Blocked shots per game			Field goal percentage			Three-point field goal percentage			Free throw percentage		
Player	School	BPG	Player	School	FG%	Player	School	3FG%	Player	School	FT%
Jordan Bachynski	Arizona St.	4.03	Jarvis Williams	Murray State	64.8	Micah Mason	Duquesne	56.0	Johnny Dee	San Diego	94.5
Khem Birch	UNLV	3.76	Marshall Bjorklund	North Dakota St.	62.9	Devante Wallace	High Point	49.1	Travis Bader	Oakland	94.3
Rhamel Brown	Manhattan	3.64	Terrence Smith	NJIT	62.9	Melvin Johnson III	Arkansas St.	47.8	Brenton Williams	South Carolina	93.0
D. J. Cunningham	UNC Asheville	3.63	Zeek Woodley	Northwestern St.	61.7	Dylan Garrity	Sacramento St.	47.2	Neil Watson	Southern Miss	91.8
Sim Bhullar	New Mexico St.	3.37	Jameel Warney	Stony Brook	61.6	Ethan Wragge	Creighton	47.0	Josh Greene	Cal St. Northridge	91.4

== Postseason tournaments ==
=== NCAA tournament ===
Final Four – AT&T Stadium in Arlington, Texas

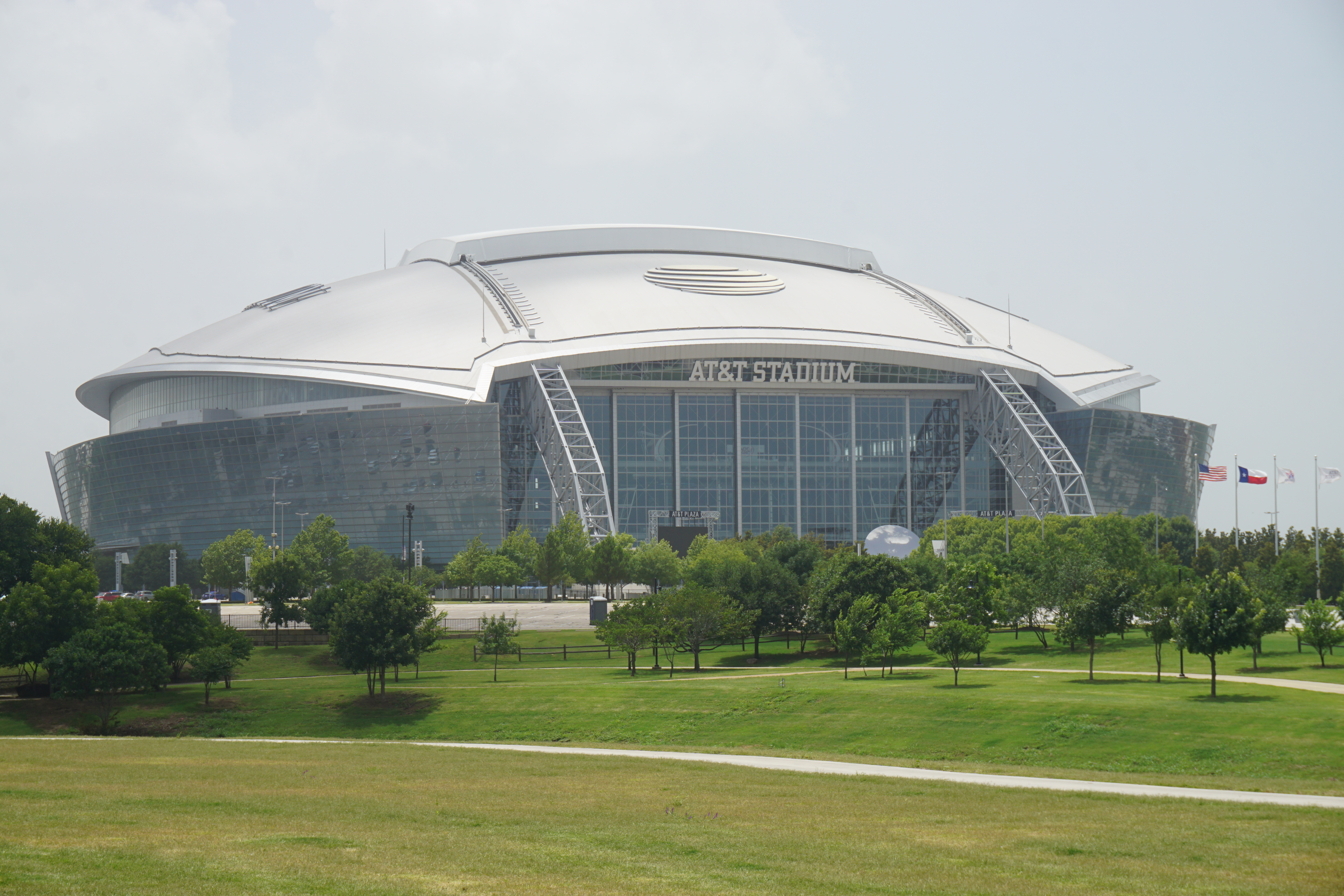
AT&T Stadium in Arlington, Texas, hosted the NCAA men's Final Four.

National Semifinals; April 5, 2014
S1	Florida	53
E7	UConn	63
W2	Wisconsin	73
MW8	Kentucky	74

National Championship Game; April 7, 2014
E7	UConn	60
MW8	Kentucky	54

==== Tournament upsets ====
For this list, a "major upset" is defined as a win by a team seeded 7 or more spots below its defeated opponent.

Date	Winner	Score	Loser	Region	Round
March 20	Harvard (12)	61–57	Cincinnati (5)	East	Round of 64
March 20	North Dakota State (12)	80–75 (OT)	Oklahoma (5)	West	Round of 64
March 21	Mercer (14)	78–71	Duke (3)	Midwest	Round of 64
March 21	Stephen F. Austin (12)	77–75 (OT)	VCU (5)	South	Round of 64
March 22	Dayton (11)	55–53	Syracuse (3)	South	Round of 32
March 23	Stanford (10)	60–57	Kansas (2)	South	Round of 32
March 23	Kentucky (8)	78–76	Wichita State (1)	Midwest	Round of 32

=== National Invitation tournament ===
After the NCAA tournament field is announced, the NCAA invited 32 teams to participate in the National Invitation Tournament. The tournament began on March 18, 2014 with all games prior to the semifinals played on campus sites. The semifinals and final were respectively held on April 1 and 3 at the traditional site of Madison Square Garden in New York City.

Semifinals; April 1, 2014
1	SMU	65
3	Clemson	59
1	Minnesota	67^{OT}
1	Florida State	64

Championship game April 3, 2014
1	SMU	63
1	Minnesota	65

=== College Basketball Invitational ===
The sixth College Basketball Invitational (CBI) Tournament began on March 18, 2014 and will end with a best-of-three final scheduled for March 31, April 2, and April 5; the final went the full three games. This tournament featured 16 teams who were left out of the NCAA tournament and NIT.

Semifinals; March 26, 2014
Illinois State	49
Siena	61
Old Dominion	64
Fresno State	71

Championship Series; March 31, April 2 and 5, 2014
Siena	61	75	81
Fresno State	57	89	68

=== CollegeInsider.com Postseason tournament ===
The fifth CollegeInsider.com Postseason Tournament was held beginning March 17, 2014 and ending with a championship game on April 3, 2014. This tournament places an emphasis on selecting successful teams from "mid-major" conferences who were left out of the NCAA tournament and NIT. 32 teams participated in this tournament.

Semifinals; April 1, 2014
Yale	75
VMI	62
Pacific	75
Murray State	98

Championship; April 3, 2014
Yale	57
Murray State	65

== Award winners ==
=== Consensus All-American teams ===
The following players are recognized as the 2014 Consensus All-Americans:

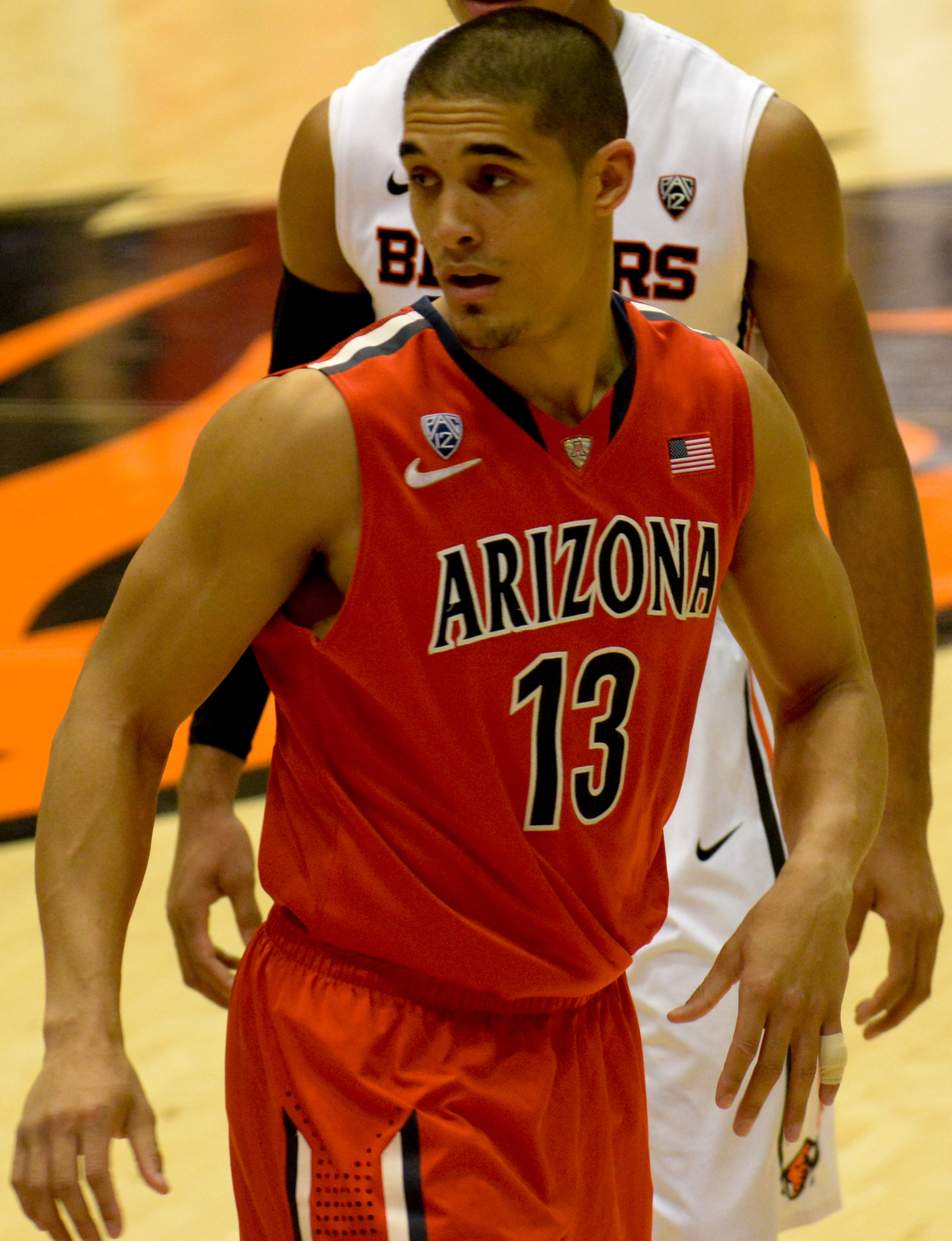
Nick Johnson

Consensus First Team
Player	Position	Class	Team
Nick Johnson	SG	Junior	Arizona
Doug McDermott	SF	Senior	Creighton
Shabazz Napier	PG	Senior	UConn
Jabari Parker	PF	Freshman	Duke
Russ Smith	PG/SG	Senior	Louisville

Consensus Second Team
Player	Position	Class	Team
Cleanthony Early	F	Senior	Wichita State
C. J. Fair	SF	Senior	Syracuse
Sean Kilpatrick	SG	Senior	Cincinnati
Nik Stauskas	SF	Sophomore	Michigan
T. J. Warren	SF	Sophomore	NC State
Andrew Wiggins	SF	Freshman	Kansas

=== Major player of the year awards ===
- Wooden Award: Doug McDermott, Creighton
- Naismith Award: Doug McDermott, Creighton
- Associated Press Player of the Year: Doug McDermott, Creighton
- NABC Player of the Year: Doug McDermott, Creighton
- Oscar Robertson Trophy (USBWA): Doug McDermott, Creighton
- Sporting News Player of the Year: Doug McDermott, Creighton

=== Major freshman of the year awards ===
- Wayman Tisdale Award (USBWA): Jabari Parker, Duke
- Sporting News Freshman of the Year:

=== Major coach of the year awards ===
- Associated Press Coach of the Year: Gregg Marshall, Wichita State
- Henry Iba Award (USBWA): Gregg Marshall, Wichita State
- NABC Coach of the Year: Gregg Marshall, Wichita State
- Naismith College Coach of the Year: Gregg Marshall, Wichita State
- Sporting News Coach of the Year: Gregg Marshall, Wichita State

=== Other major awards ===
- Bob Cousy Award (Best point guard): Shabazz Napier, UConn
- Pete Newell Big Man Award (Best big man): Patric Young, Florida
- NABC Defensive Player of the Year: Aaron Craft, Ohio State
- Frances Pomeroy Naismith Award (Best senior 6'0"/1.83 m or shorter): Russ Smith, Louisville
- Senior CLASS Award (top senior): Doug McDermott, Creighton
- Robert V. Geasey Trophy (Top player in Philadelphia Big 5): James Bell, Villanova
- Haggerty Award (Top player in New York City metro area): D'Angelo Harrison, St. John's
- Ben Jobe Award (Top minority coach): Willis Wilson, Texas A&M Corpus Christi
- Hugh Durham Award (Top mid-major coach): Tony Jasick, IPFW
- Jim Phelan Award (Top head coach): Tim Miles, Nebraska
- Lefty Driesell Award (Top defensive player): Elfrid Payton, Louisiana–Lafayette
- Lou Henson Award (Top mid-major player): Langston Hall, Mercer
- Lute Olson Award (Top non-freshman or transfer player): Doug McDermott, Creighton
- Skip Prosser Man of the Year Award (Coach with moral character): Brian Wardle, Green Bay
- Academic All-American of the Year (Top scholar-athlete): Aaron Craft, Ohio State
- Elite 89 Award (Top GPA among upperclass players at Final Four): Sam Malone, Kentucky.

== Coaching changes ==
A number of teams changed coaches during and after the season.

Team	Former coach	Interim coach	New coach	Reason
Appalachian State	Jason Capel		Jim Fox	Capel's expiring four-year contract was not renewed after he went 53–70 in his time at Appalachian State. Appalachian State hired Davidson assistant Fox.
Auburn	Tony Barbee		Bruce Pearl	Barbee was fired after going 48–75 overall and 18–50 in the SEC in four seasons. Auburn replaced him with ESPN analyst Pearl, who enjoyed major success as a head coach at Milwaukee and Tennessee before being fired in 2011 for lying to the NCAA about the recruitment of future Ohio State star Aaron Craft. When he was hired, Pearl was under a show-cause penalty that expired in August 2014.
Boston College	Steve Donahue		Jim Christian	Donahue was fired after posting an 8–24 record, his third straight losing season at BC.
Bowling Green	Louis Orr		Chris Jans	Orr was fired after posting 13–19 and 12–20 records in the last two seasons, finishing with a 101–121 record after seven seasons. Wichita State assistant Jans was hired as his replacement.
California	Mike Montgomery		Cuonzo Martin	Montgomery announced his retirement after six seasons at Cal. In 32 seasons as a collegiate head coach, Montgomery captured 677 career victories and exits the game as the 25th-winningest head men's basketball coach with at least 10 years of experience at the Division I level in NCAA history
Central Arkansas	Corliss Williamson	Clarence Finley	Russ Pennell	
College of Charleston	Doug Wojcik		Earl Grant	Wojcik was fired on August 5, 2014 after allegations of verbal abuse towards players surfaced
Coppin State	Fang Mitchell		Michael Grant	
Delaware State	Greg Jackson		Keith Walker	
Florida A&M	Clemon Johnson		Byron Samuels	
Florida Atlantic	Mike Jarvis		Michael Curry	Jarvis and Florida Atlantic mutually agreed to part ways after five of the past six seasons resulted in losing records, including a 10–19 overall mark in 2013–14
Grambling State	Joseph Price		Shawn Walker	
Hawaii	Gib Arnold	Benjy Taylor		Arnold was fired mere weeks before the 2014–15 season following an NCAA investigation that also saw the dismissal of assistant Brandyn Akana.
Houston	James Dickey		Kelvin Sampson	Dickey resigned after four seasons and a 64–62 overall record, citing family reasons. The Cougars hired Houston Rockets assistant Sampson, who returns to the college ranks after serving a five-year show-cause penalty for making impermissible cell phone calls to recruits during his previous two college jobs at Oklahoma and Indiana.
IPFW	Tony Jasick		Jon Coffman	
IUPUI	Todd Howard		Jason Gardner	Howard was fired after back-to-back seasons of 6–26 records and having gone 2–28 in conference games during that span.
Jacksonville	Cliff Warren		Tony Jasick	
Lamar	Pat Knight		Tic Price	Knight was fired during his third season after posting a 29–62 record.
Loyola Marymount	Max Good		Mike Dunlap	Good was fired after five seasons, ending with injury-riddled 11–23 and 13–19 seasons. LMU hired Mike Dunlap, a former Charlotte Bobcats head coach and former assistant with several college teams.
Maine	Ted Woodward		Bob Walsh	
Marist	Jeff Bower		Mike Maker	Bower left to become general manager of the Detroit Pistons. Marist went to the Division III ranks to hire Maker, fresh off leading Williams to that division's championship game.
Marquette	Buzz Williams		Steve Wojciechowski	Williams left Marquette to take the Virginia Tech job. The Golden Eagles hired Duke assistant Wojciechowski.
Marshall	Tom Herrion		Dan D'Antoni	Herrion, who had coached at Marshall for four seasons, was bought out of the final two years of his contract. Marshall, which finished the season at 11–22, lost its top seven scorers from last season, notably DeAndre Kane, who transferred to Iowa State and became an All-Big 12 first-team selection. Marshall hired former NBA assistant D'Antoni, older brother of former Marshall great and then-current Los Angeles Lakers head coach Mike D'Antoni.
Maryland Eastern Shore	Frankie Allen		Bobby Collins	
Missouri	Frank Haith		Kim Anderson	Haith left Missouri for the Tulsa job.
Montana	Wayne Tinkle		Travis DeCuire	Tinkle left for the Oregon State job. Montana hired former Cal assistant DeCuire, a former Montana player who had been publicly endorsed by retiring Cal head coach Mike Montgomery as his successor before Cuonzo Martin was hired from Tennessee.
Montana State	Brad Huse		Brian Fish	
North Dakota State	Saul Phillips		David Richman	Phillips left to take the Ohio job.
Ohio	Jim Christian		Saul Phillips	Christian left to take the Boston College job.
Oregon State	Craig Robinson		Wayne Tinkle	Robinson, best known outside basketball as the older brother of First Lady Michelle Obama, was fired after six seasons in which the Beavers never made either the NCAA tournament or the NIT.
Rice	Ben Braun		Mike Rhoades	Braun resigned after six seasons and an overall 63–128 record at Rice. The program was plagued by player transfers in his last few seasons, most notably that of Arsalan Kazemi to Oregon after the 2011–12 season. Rice hired VCU assistant Mike Rhoades.
Samford	Bennie Seltzer		Scott Padgett	Seltzer was fired after two seasons, finishing with a 24–31 overall record. Even more significantly, Seltzer had 14 players transfer out of the program during his tenure, including five of the team's six top scorers in the just-completed season. Two days after reports of the firing, top assistant Padgett was promoted.
South Dakota	Joey James		Craig Smith	James was not retained after one season as the interim head coach. South Dakota finished 12–18. South Dakota hired former Nebraska assistant Smith.
Southeastern Louisiana	Jim Yarbrough		Jay Ladner	
South Florida	Stan Heath		Orlando Antigua	Heath was fired two seasons into a six-year contract he signed after he led USF to the 2012 NCAA tournament. His success at USF did not continue, as the Bulls finished each of the last two seasons at 12–19 overall and 3–15 in league play. South Florida hired Kentucky assistant Orlando Antigua.
Southern Miss	Donnie Tyndall		Doc Sadler	Tyndall left to take the Tennessee job.
Tennessee	Cuonzo Martin		Donnie Tyndall	Martin left to take the California job.
Tennessee–Martin	Jason James		Heath Schroyer	James was fired during his fifth season after posting a 37–117 record.
Tennessee State	Travis Williams		Dana Ford	
Tulsa	Danny Manning		Frank Haith	Manning left for the Wake Forest job.
UNC Wilmington	Buzz Peterson		Kevin Keatts	Peterson was fired at the end of his fourth season after posting a 42–82 record, ending with a last-place CAA finish this season. UNCW hired Louisville assistant Keatts.
Virginia Tech	James Johnson		Buzz Williams	After a 9–22 season, Johnson was fired at the end of his second season as head coach. Johnson was unable to keep two key players in the program—Dorian Finney-Smith transferred to Florida immediately after Johnson was elevated from assistant, and Montrezl Harrell, who had originally committed to Tech, instead went to Louisville.
Wake Forest	Jeff Bzdelik		Danny Manning	Bzdelik resigned after four seasons with records of 51–76 overall and 17–51 in ACC play. Like Ben Braun at Rice and Bennie Seltzer at Samford, Bzdelik was plagued by player transfers, with eight players transferring out during his tenure. Students responded by "rolling" trees in the campus quad with toilet paper, a Wake Forest tradition after big wins.
Washington State	Ken Bone		Ernie Kent	After five years and an 80–86 record, Bone was fired with two years left on his contract; Washington State will pay him the remaining balance of his contract. Bone's final season saw the Cougars go 10–21 overall and 3–15 in the Pac-12 .
Western Illinois	Jim Molinari		Billy Wright	
