= 2013–14 Western Illinois Leathernecks men's basketball team =

American college basketball season

2013–14 Western Illinois Leathernecks men's basketball
- Conference: The Summit League
- Record: 10–20 (4–10 The Summit)
- Head coach: Jim Molinari (6th season)
- Assistant coaches: Wade Hokenson; Damon James; Josh Wolfe
- Home arena: Western Hall

2013–14 Summit League men's basketball standings
	Conf.				Overall
Team	W		L	PCT	W		L	PCT
North Dakota State †	12	–	2	.857	26	–	7	.788
IPFW	10	–	4	.714	25	–	11	.694
South Dakota State	10	–	4	.714	19	–	13	.594
Denver	8	–	6	.571	16	–	15	.516
South Dakota	6	–	8	.429	12	–	18	.400
Omaha *	5	–	9	.357	17	–	15	.531
Western Illinois	4	–	10	.286	10	–	20	.333
IUPUI	1	–	13	.071	6	–	26	.188
† 2014 Summit League tournament winner Rankings from AP poll *ineligible for NCAA postseason Div. I tournament due to Div. I transition

The 2013–14 Western Illinois Leathernecks men's basketball team represented Western Illinois University during the 2013–14 NCAA Division I men's basketball season. The Leathernecks, led by sixth year head coach Jim Molinari, played their home games at Western Hall and were members of The Summit League. They finished the season 10–20, 4–10 in The Summit League play to finish in seventh place. They lost to South Dakota State in the quarterfinals of The Summit League tournament.

At the end of the season, head coach Jim Molinari resigned to take an assistants job at Nebraska. His record was 79–104 in six seasons.

== Roster ==
Number	Name	Position	Height	Weight	Year	Hometown
1	Jabari Sandifer	Guard	6–1	170	Freshman	Naperville, Illinois
10	Jordan Foster	Guard	5–11	175	Sophomore	Chicago, Illinois
12	Jason Hawthorne	Guard	6–0	170	Sophomore	Houston, Texas
14	Bully Molinari	Guard	6–2	190	Senior	Peoria, Illinois
24	Remy Roberts-Burnett	Guard	6–0	180	Junior	Joliet, Illinois
30	Mike Miklusak	Forward	6–6	190	Freshman	Dyer, Indiana
31	Garret Covington	Forward	6–5	180	Freshman	Edwardsville, Illinois
32	Tate Stensgaard	Forward	6–8	190	Sophomore	Rapid City, South Dakota
33	Adam Link	Forward	6–6	210	Senior	Elbert, Colorado
34	Mohamed Conde	Forward	6–7	200	Junior	Belleville, Michigan
43	Travis Barnes	Forward	6–7	215	Freshman	Walstonburg, North Carolina
52	Michael Ochereobia	Center	6–8	260	Senior	Hackney, England

== Schedule ==
Date time, TV	Opponent	Result	Record	Site (attendance) city, state
Exhibition
11/05/2013*; 7:00 pm	Knox	W 97–54		Western Hall (1,310); Macomb, IL
Regular season
11/09/2013*; 9:00 pm	at Idaho	L 63–67	0–1	Memorial Gym (1,326); Moscow, ID
11/12/2013*; 7:00 pm	at Nebraska	L 47–62	0–2	Pinnacle Bank Arena (14,771); Lincoln, NE
11/17/2013*; 4:00 pm	at Pacific	L 52–66	0–3	Alex G. Spanos Center (1,771); Stockton, CA
11/21/2013*; 7:00 pm	Eureka	W 79–52	1–3	Western Hall (1,211); Macomb, IL
11/26/2013*; 7:30 pm	at Southeastern Louisiana	L 52–62	1–4	University Center (460); Hammond, LA
11/30/2013*; 7:00 pm	Greenville	W 76–49	2–4	Western Hall (1,147); Macomb, IL
12/04/2013*; 7:00 pm	Eastern Illinois	W 60–32	3–4	Western Hall (1,585); Macomb, IL
12/07/2013*; 7:00 pm	Grace Bible	W 77–43	4–4	Western Hall (1,112); Macomb, IL
12/16/2013*; 7:00 pm	at Alabama State	W 59–52	4–5	Dunn–Oliver Acadome (236); Montgomery, AL
12/19/2013*; 9:00 pm	at Utah State; Basketball Travelers Classic	L 52–68	4–6	Smith Spectrum (9,447); Logan, UT
12/20/2013*; 6:30 pm	vs. Troy; Basketball Travelers Classic	W 61–58	5–6	Smith Spectrum (1,760); Logan, UT
12/21/2013*; 6:30 pm	vs. UC Santa Barbara; Basketball Travelers Classic	L 55–61	5–7	Smith Spectrum (1,915); Logan, UT
12/28/2013*; 8:00 pm	at UTEP; Sun Bowl Classic	L 64–67	5–8	Don Haskins Center (6,132); El Paso, TX
12/29/2013*; 6:00 pm	vs. Alcorn State; Sun Bowl Classic	W 64–62 ^{2OT}	6–8	Don Haskins Center (6,244); El Paso, TX
01/04/2014*; 7:00 pm	William & Mary	L 67–78	6–9	Western Hall (1,096); Macomb, IL
01/11/2014; 7:00 pm	Nebraska–Omaha	W 79–72 ^{OT}	7–9 (1–0)	Western Hall (2,113); Macomb, IL
01/16/2014; 7:00 pm	at South Dakota State	L 55–64	7–10 (1–1)	Frost Arena (2,023); Brookings, SD
01/18/2014; 2:00 pm	at North Dakota State	L 52–65	7–11 (1–2)	Bison Sports Arena (4,284); Fargo, ND
01/23/2014; 7:00 pm	South Dakota	W 79–61	8–11 (2–2)	Western Hall (2,268); Macomb, IL
01/25/2014; 6:00 pm	Denver	L 55–67	8–12 (2–3)	Western Hall (2,920); Macomb, IL
01/30/2014; 6:00 pm	at IUPUI	W 69–54	9–12 (3–3)	The Jungle (524); Indianapolis, IN
02/01/2014; 6:00 pm	at IPFW	L 64–77	9–13 (3–4)	Gates Sports Center (932); Fort Wayne, IN
02/08/2014; 1:00 pm	at Nebraska–Omaha	L 60–71	9–14 (3–5)	Ralston Arena (1,083); Ralston, NE
02/13/2014; 7:00 pm	North Dakota State	L 52–56	9–15 (3–6)	Western Hall (1,962); Macomb, IL
02/15/2014; 7:00 pm	South Dakota State	L 50–62	9–16 (3–7)	Western Hall (2,213); Macomb, IL
02/20/2014; 8:00 pm	at Denver	L 67–75	9–17 (3–8)	Magness Arena (1,846); Denver, CO
02/22/2014; 4:00 pm	at South Dakota	L 54–64	9–18 (3–9)	DakotaDome (2,102); Vermillion, SD
02/27/2014; 7:00 pm	IPFW	L 56–65	9–19 (3–10)	Western Hall (1,151); Macomb, IL
03/01/2014; 7:00 pm	IUPUI	W 75–70	10–19 (4–10)	Western Hall (1,901); Macomb, IL
The Summit League tournament
03/09/2014; 8:30 pm, FCS Atlantic	vs. South Dakota State; Quarterfinals	L 50–71	10–20	Sioux Falls Arena (6,647); Sioux Falls, SD
*Non-conference game. ^{#}Rankings from AP Poll. (#) Tournament seedings in parentheses. All times are in Central Time.
