= 2013–14 IPFW Mastodons men's basketball team =

American college basketball season

2013–14 Fort Wayne Mastodons men's basketball
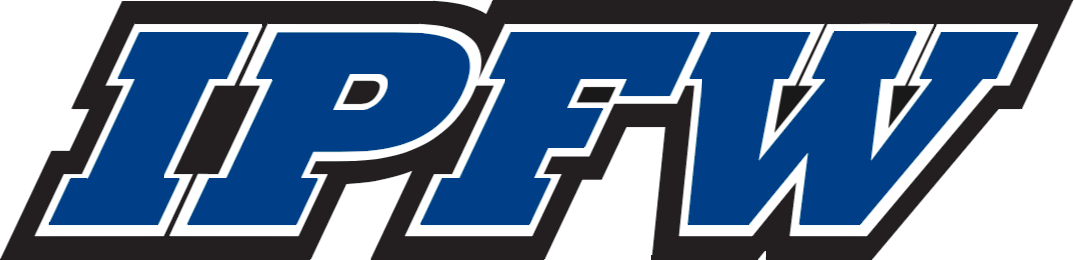

CIT Second round vs. VMI, L 95–106
- Conference: The Summit League
- Record: 25–11 (10–4 The Summit)
- Head coach: Tony Jasick (3rd season)
- Assistant coaches: Jon Coffman; Azzez Ali; Ryan Sims
- Home arena: Gates Sports Center

2013–14 Summit League men's basketball standings
	Conf.				Overall
Team	W		L	PCT	W		L	PCT
North Dakota State †	12	–	2	.857	26	–	7	.788
IPFW	10	–	4	.714	25	–	11	.694
South Dakota State	10	–	4	.714	19	–	13	.594
Denver	8	–	6	.571	16	–	15	.516
South Dakota	6	–	8	.429	12	–	18	.400
Omaha *	5	–	9	.357	17	–	15	.531
Western Illinois	4	–	10	.286	10	–	20	.333
IUPUI	1	–	13	.071	6	–	26	.188
† 2014 Summit League tournament winner Rankings from AP poll *ineligible for NCAA postseason Div. I tournament due to Div. I transition

The 2013–14 Fort Wayne Mastodons men's basketball team represented Indiana University – Purdue University Fort Wayne during the 2013–14 NCAA Division I men's basketball season. The Mastodons, led by third year head coach Tony Jasick, played their home games at the Gates Sports Center and were members of The Summit League. They finished the season 25–11, 10–4 in The Summit League play to finish in a tie for second place. They advanced to the championship game of The Summit League tournament where they lost to North Dakota State. They were invited to the CollegeInsider.com Tournament where they defeated Akron in the first round before losing in the second round to VMI.

At the end of the season, head coach Tony Jasick resigned to take the head coaching position at Jacksonville. Jasick was 52–47 in three seasons. IPFW promoted assistant coach Jon Coffman to replace Jasick.

== Roster ==
Number	Name	Position	Height	Weight	Year	Hometown
2	Pierre Bland	Guard	6–2	215	Senior	Jacksonville, Florida
3	Herbert Graham	Guard	6–4	175	Sophomore	North Miami Beach, Florida
5	Mo Evans	Guard	5–11	170	Freshman	Indianapolis, Indiana
10	Max Landis	Guard	6–2	175	Junior	Indianapolis, Indiana
11	Isaiah McCray	Guard	6–0	180	Junior	Baltimore, Maryland
13	Luis Jacobo	Forward	6–5	215	Senior	Sanford, Florida
20	Michael Kibiloski	Forward	6–7	245	Senior	Elkhart, Indiana
21	Trevor Osborn	Guard	5–11	155	Freshman	Fort Wayne, Indiana
23	Kevin Harden	Guard	6–2	180	Senior	Orlando, Florida
25	Jared Bloom	Guard	6–0	175	Freshman	Warsaw, Indiana
35	Will Dunn	Guard	6–2	185	Sophomore	Edina, Minnesota
44	Joe Reed	Forward	6–7	205	Sophomore	Greenwood, Indiana
50	Brent Calhoun	Forward	6–8	290	Sophomore	Indianapolis, Indiana
53	Joe Edwards	Guard	6–4	190	Junior	Chicago, Illinois
54	Steve Forbes	Forward	6–9	320	Junior	Clermont, Florida

== Schedule ==
Date time, TV	Opponent	Result	Record	Site (attendance) city, state
Regular season
11/09/2013*; 2:00 pm	at Dayton	L 80–81	0–1	UD Arena (12,145); Dayton, OH
11/13/2013*; 7:00 pm	IU Kokomo; Islanders Tournament	W 90–62	1–1	Gates Sports Center (787); Fort Wayne, IN
11/15/2013*; 8:30 pm	at Texas A&M–Corpus Christi; Islanders Tournament	L 71–72	1–2	American Bank Center (1,304); Corpus Christi, TX
11/16/2013*; 4:00 pm	vs. Texas–Pan American; Islanders Tournament	W 66–60	2–2	American Bank Center (N/A); Corpus Christi, TX
11/17/2013*; 2:00 pm	vs. Tennessee Tech; Islanders Tournament	W 69–66	3–2	American Bank Center (N/A); Corpus Christi, TX
11/20/2013*; 7:00 pm	Purdue–Calumet	W 106–72	4–2	Gates Sports Center (1,060); Fort Wayne, IN
11/24/2013*; 2:00 pm	at Kennesaw State	W 76–66	5–2	KSU Convocation Center (886); Kennesaw, GA
11/27/2013*; 8:00 pm	at Eastern Illinois	W 71–65	6–2	Lantz Arena (425); Charleston, IL
11/29/2013*; 8:00 pm, ESPN3	at Illinois	L 55–57	6–3	State Farm Center (15,638); Champaign, IL
12/03/2013*; 7:00 pm	at Miami (OH)	L 87–94	6–4	Millett Hall (1,667); Oxford, OH
12/07/2013*; 7:00 pm	Dartmouth	W 80–64	7–4	Gates Sports Center (2,175); Fort Wayne, IN
12/10/2013*; 8:00 pm	at Bradley	W 65–61	8–4	Carver Arena (5,977); Peoria, IL
12/14/2013*; 7:00 pm	SIU Edwardsville	W 95–75	9–4	Gates Sports Center (702); Fort Wayne, IN
12/21/2013*; 2:00 pm	Eastern Illinois	W 86–65	10–4	Gates Sports Center (613); Fort Wayne, IN
12/29/2013*; 2:00 pm	Eastern Kentucky	L 68–90	10–5	Gates Sports Center (1,021); Fort Wayne, IN
01/02/2014*; 7:00 pm	at Bowling Green	W 65–60	11–5	Stroh Center (1,282); Bowling Green, OH
01/04/2014*; 2:00 pm	Kalamazoo	W 110–74	12–5	Gates Sports Center (507); Fort Wayne, IN
01/09/2014; 7:00 pm	North Dakota State	W 82–71	13–5 (1–0)	Gates Sports Center (608); Fort Wayne, IN
01/11/2014; 7:00 pm	South Dakota State	W 82–75	14–5 (2–0)	Gates Sports Center (N/A); Fort Wayne, IN
01/16/2014; 9:00 pm	at Denver	W 67–64	15–5 (3–0)	Magness Arena (1,609); Denver, CO
01/18/2014; 5:00 pm	at South Dakota	L 61–75	15–6 (3–1)	DakotaDome (2,003); Vermillion, SD
01/25/2014; 7:00 pm	IUPUI	W 90–75	16–6 (4–1)	Gates Sports Center (954); Fort Wayne, IN
01/30/2014; 7:00 pm	Nebraska–Omaha	W 86–82	17–6 (5–1)	Gates Sports Center (684); Fort Wayne, IN
02/01/2014; 7:00 pm	Western Illinois	W 77–64	18–6 (6–1)	Gates Sports Center (932); Fort Wayne, IN
02/06/2014; 8:00 pm	at South Dakota State	L 51–79	18–7 (6–2)	Frost Arena (2,144); Brookings, SD
02/08/2014; 4:00 pm	at North Dakota State	L 58–69	18–8 (6–3)	Bison Sports Arena (4,557); Fargo, ND
02/13/2014; 7:00 pm	South Dakota	W 75–69	19–8 (7–3)	Gates Sports Center (687); Fort Wayne, IN
02/15/2014; 7:00 pm	Denver	L 62–73	19–9 (7–4)	Gates Sports Center (979); Fort Wayne, IN
02/22/2014; 2:00 pm	at IUPUI	W 84–60	20–9 (8–4)	The Jungle (1,002); Indianapolis, IN
02/27/2014; 8:00 pm	at Western Illinois	W 65–56	21–9 (9–4)	Western Hall (1,151); Macomb, IL
03/01/2014; 2:00 pm	at Nebraska–Omaha	W 96–95 ^{OT}	22–9 (10–4)	Ralston Arena (1,242); Ralston, NE
The Summit League tournament
03/08/2014; 7:00 pm, FCS Atlantic	vs. IUPUI; Quarterfinals	W 85–47	23–9	Sioux Falls Arena (3,153); Sioux Falls, SD
03/10/2014; 9:30 pm, FCS Atlantic	vs. South Dakota State; Semifinals	W 64–60	24–9	Sioux Falls Arena (6,769); Sioux Falls, SD
03/11/2014; 9:00 pm, ESPN2	vs. North Dakota State; Championship	L 57–60	24–10	Sioux Falls Arena (4,263); Sioux Falls, SD
CIT
03/19/2014*; 7:00 pm	Akron; First round	W 97–91	25–10	Gates Sports Center (1,283); Fort Wayne, IN
03/22/2014*; 1:00 pm	at VMI; Second round	L 95–106	25–11	Cameron Hall (3,642); Lexington, VA
*Non-conference game. (#) Tournament seedings in parentheses. All times are in Eastern Time.
