= 2013–14 North Dakota State Bison men's basketball team =

American college basketball season

2013–14 North Dakota State Bison men's basketball

The Summit League Regular Season & tournament champions

NCAA tournament, round of 32
- Conference: The Summit League
- Record: 26–7 (12–2 The Summit)
- Head coach: Saul Phillips (7th season)
- Assistant coaches: David Richman; Will Ryan; Freddy Coleman
- Home arena: Bison Sports Arena

2013–14 Summit League men's basketball standings
	Conf.				Overall
Team	W		L	PCT	W		L	PCT
North Dakota State †	12	–	2	.857	26	–	7	.788
IPFW	10	–	4	.714	25	–	11	.694
South Dakota State	10	–	4	.714	19	–	13	.594
Denver	8	–	6	.571	16	–	15	.516
South Dakota	6	–	8	.429	12	–	18	.400
Omaha *	5	–	9	.357	17	–	15	.531
Western Illinois	4	–	10	.286	10	–	20	.333
IUPUI	1	–	13	.071	6	–	26	.188
† 2014 Summit League tournament winner Rankings from AP poll *ineligible for NCAA postseason Div. I tournament due to Div. I transition

The 2013–14 North Dakota State Bison men's basketball team represented North Dakota State University in the 2013–14 NCAA Division I men's basketball season. The Bison, led by seventh year head coach Saul Phillips, played their home games at the Bison Sports Arena and were members of The Summit League. They finished the season 26–7, 12–2 in The Summit League play to finish win The Summit League regular season championship. They were also champions of The Summit League tournament to earn an automatic bid to the NCAA tournament. In the NCAA Tournament, they defeated Oklahoma in the second round before losing to San Diego State in the round of 32.

At the end of the season, Saul Phillips resigned to take the head coaching job at Ohio. He was 134–84 in seven seasons. He was replaced by associate head coach David Richman.

== Roster ==
Number	Name	Position	Height	Weight	Year	Hometown
0	Fred Newell	Guard	5–8	160	Senior	Lakeville, Minnesota
3	Mike Felt	Guard	6–3	190	Senior	Redwood Falls, Minnesota
12	Lawrence Alexander	Guard	6–3	180	Junior	Peoria, Illinois
13	Carlin Dupree	Guard	6–3	180	Freshman	Milwaukee, Wisconsin
21	A. J. Jacobson	Guard	6–6	205	Freshman	Fargo, North Dakota
22	Kory Brown	Guard	6–4	200	Sophomore	Hoffman Estates, Illinois
23	Brett VandenBergh	Forward	6–5	215	Sophomore	De Pere, Wisconsin
24	Taylor Braun	Guard	6–7	210	Senior	Newberg, Oregon
25	Joel Lindberg	Guard	6–2	190	Junior	Superior, Wisconsin
32	TrayVonn Wright	Forward	6–7	185	Senior	Waterloo, Iowa
34	Chris Kading	Forward	6–8	230	Sophomore	De Pere, Wisconsin
40	Dexter Werner	Forward	6–6	235	RS–Freshman	Bismarck, North Dakota
42	Marshall Bjorklund	Forward	6–8	250	Senior	Arlington, Minnesota
44	Jordan Aaberg	Forward	6–9	225	Senior	Rothsay, Minnesota

== Schedule ==
Date time, TV	Rank^{#}	Opponent^{#}	Result	Record	Site (attendance) city, state
Exhibition
10/30/2013*; 7:00 pm		Concordia–Moorhead	W 98–49		Bison Sports Arena (2,329); Fargo, ND
Regular season
11/08/2013*; 7:00 pm		Viterbo	W 93–49	1–0	Bison Sports Arena (2,157); Fargo, ND
11/14/2013*; 10:30 pm		at Saint Mary's	L 65–78	1–1	McKeon Pavilion (2,178); Moraga, CA
11/18/2013*; 7:00 pm, MeTV		Southern Mississippi	L 69–70	1–2	Bison Sports Arena (3,724); Fargo, ND
11/20/2013*; 6:00 pm		at Western Michigan	W 83–74	2–2	University Arena (2,111); Kalamazoo, MI
11/24/2013*; 5:00 pm, MidcoSN/FCS Pacific		at North Dakota	L 77–95	2–3	Betty Engelstad Sioux Center (3,142); Grand Forks, ND
11/29/2013*; 10:00 pm		at Santa Clara; Cable Car Classic	W 91–85	3–3	Leavey Center (850); Santa Clara, CA
11/30/2013*; 10:45 pm		vs. Rider; Cable Car Classic	W 87–70	4–3	Leavey Center (1,024); Santa Clara, CA
12/02/2013*; 7:00 pm		Valley City State	W 86–43	5–3	Bison Sports Arena (1,047); Fargo, ND
12/07/2013*; 12:00 pm		at Bryant; Gotham Classic	W 66–62	6–3	Chace Athletic Center (2,200); Smithfield, RI
12/11/2013*; 6:00 pm, ESPNU		at Notre Dame; Gotham Classic	W 73–69	7–3	Purcell Pavilion (7,662); Notre Dame, IN
12/14/2013*; 7:15 pm, BTN		at No. 3 Ohio State; Gotham Classic	L 62–79	7–4	Value City Arena (15,272); Columbus, OH
12/16/2013*; 7:00 pm, MeTV		Delaware; Gotham Classic	W 85–66	8–4	Bison Sports Arena (3,014); Fargo, ND
12/21/2013*; 7:00 pm, NBC North Dakota/ESPN3		Towson	W 90–82	9–4	Bison Sports Arena (2,905); Fargo, ND
12/23/2013*; 8:00 pm		at Utah Valley	W 74–70	10–4	UCCU Center (1,092); Orem, UT
01/04/2014*; 7:00 pm		Mayville State	W 96–45	11–4	Bison Sports Arena (1,224); Fargo, ND
01/09/2014; 6:00 pm		at IPFW	L 71–82	11–5 (0–1)	Gates Sports Center (608); Fort Wayne, IN
01/11/2014; 1:00 pm, ESPN3		at IUPUI	W 87–64	12–5 (1–1)	The Jungle (778); Indianapolis, IN
01/16/2014; 7:00 pm, MeTV		Nebraska–Omaha	W 91–69	13–5 (2–1)	Bison Sports Arena (3,274); Fargo, ND
01/18/2014; 2:00 pm, MeTV		Western Illinois	W 65–52	14–5 (3–1)	Bison Sports Arena (4,284); Fargo, ND
01/25/2014; 4:00 pm, MidcoSN/FCS		at South Dakota State	W 85–77	15–5 (4–1)	Frost Arena (4,859); Brookings, SD
01/30/2014; 7:00 pm, MidcoSN		at South Dakota	W 66–63	16–5 (5–1)	DakotaDome (1,756); Vermillion, SD
02/01/2014; 5:00 pm		at Denver	L 63–67	16–6 (5–2)	Magness Arena (4,021); Denver, CO
02/06/2014; 7:00 pm, MidcoSN/FCS		IUPUI	W 66–60	17–6 (6–2)	Bison Sports Arena (2,877); Fargo, ND
02/08/2014; 4:00 pm, MidcoSN/FCS		IPFW	W 69–58	18–6 (7–2)	Bison Sports Arena (4,557); Fargo, ND
02/13/2014; 7:00 pm		at Western Illinois	W 56–52	19–6 (8–2)	Western Hall (1,962); Macomb, IL
02/15/2014; 4:00 pm, MidcoSN/FCS		at Nebraska–Omaha	W 75–59	20–6 (9–2)	Ralston Arena (2,276); Ralston, NE
02/22/2014; 4:00 pm, MeTV		South Dakota State	W 74–59	21–6 (10–2)	Bison Sports Arena (5,614); Fargo, ND
02/27/2014; 7:00 pm, MeTV		South Dakota	W 82–54	22–6 (11–2)	Bison Sports Arena (3,804); Fargo, ND
03/01/2014; 7:00 pm, NBC North Dakota/ESPN3		Denver	W 78–68	23–6 (12–2)	Bison Sports Arena (4,527); Fargo, ND
The Summit League tournament
03/10/2014; 6:00 pm, FCS Atlantic		vs. Denver; Semifinals	W 83–48	24–6	Sioux Falls Arena (6,769); Sioux Falls, SD
03/11/2014; 8:00 pm, ESPN2		vs. IPFW; Championship	W 60–57	25–6	Sioux Falls Arena (4,263); Sioux Falls, SD
NCAA tournament
03/20/2014*; 6:27 pm, truTV	No. (12 W)	vs. No. 21 (5 W) Oklahoma; Second round	W 80–75 ^{OT}	26–6	Spokane Arena (10,962); Spokane, WA
03/22/2014*; 5:10 pm, TNT	No. (12 W)	vs. No. 13 (4 W) San Diego State; Third round	L 44–63	26–7	Spokane Arena (11,623); Spokane, WA
*Non-conference game. ^{#}Rankings from AP Poll, (#) during NCAA Tournament is seed within region W=West. (#) Tournament seedings in parentheses. All times are in Central Time.
