= 2013–14 Omaha Mavericks men's basketball team =

American college basketball season

2013–14 Omaha Mavericks men's basketball

CIT Second round vs. Murray State, L 62–86
- Conference: The Summit League
- Record: 17–15 (5–9 The Summit)
- Head coach: Derrin Hansen (9th season)
- Assistant coaches: Pat Eberhart; Tyler Erwin; Randall Herbst
- Home arena: Ralston Arena

2013–14 Summit League men's basketball standings
	Conf.				Overall
Team	W		L	PCT	W		L	PCT
North Dakota State †	12	–	2	.857	26	–	7	.788
IPFW	10	–	4	.714	25	–	11	.694
South Dakota State	10	–	4	.714	19	–	13	.594
Denver	8	–	6	.571	16	–	15	.516
South Dakota	6	–	8	.429	12	–	18	.400
Omaha *	5	–	9	.357	17	–	15	.531
Western Illinois	4	–	10	.286	10	–	20	.333
IUPUI	1	–	13	.071	6	–	26	.188
† 2014 Summit League tournament winner Rankings from AP poll *ineligible for NCAA postseason Div. I tournament due to Div. I transition

The 2013–14 Omaha Mavericks men's basketball team represented the University of Nebraska at Omaha during the 2013–14 NCAA Division I men's basketball season. The Mavericks, led by ninth year head coach Derrin Hansen, played their home games at the Ralston Arena and were members of The Summit League. They finished the season 17–15, 5–9 in The Summit League play to finish in sixth place. As part of their transition from Division II to Division I, they were ineligible for the NCAA Tournament, and thus The Summit League Tournament because its champion receives an NCAA Tournament bid. On March 11, 2014, it was announced that the Mavericks would play in the CollegeInsider.com Tournament, hosting a first round game. This made the Mavericks the first men's basketball team to play in any postseason tournament while still in the transition process to Division I. They defeated North Dakota in the first round before losing in the second round to Murray State.

== Roster ==
Number	Name	Position	Height	Weight	Year	Hometown
1	Jalen Bradley	Guard	6–0	180	RS–Freshman	Norfolk, Nebraska
2	Kyler Erickson	Guard	6–0	165	Sophomore	Omaha, Nebraska
3	Devin Patterson	Guard	5–11	160	Sophomore	Portsmouth, Virginia
4	Alex Phillips	Guard	6–3	190	Senior	Smiths Station, Alabama
5	Mike Rostampour	Forward	6–8	230	Junior	Omaha, Nebraska
10	CJ Carter	Guard	6–0	180	Junior	Omaha, Nebraska
11	Rylan Murry	Forward	6–7	240	Freshman	West Branch, Iowa
12	Caleb Steffensmeier	Guard	6–1	170	Senior	Omaha, Nebraska
21	Justin Simmons	Guard	6–3	190	Senior	Milwaukee, Wisconsin
23	Marcus Tyus	Guard	6–1	175	Sophomore	Ramsey, Minnesota
40	Simon Krych	Forward	6–8	240	Sophomore	St. Cloud, Minnesota
42	Matt Hagerbaumer	Forward	6–7	230	Senior	Lincoln, Nebraska
43	Jake White	Forward	6–8	235	Junior	Chaska, Minnesota
44	John Karhoff	Center	6–8	235	Senior	Omaha, Nebraska

== Schedule ==
Date time, TV	Opponent	Result	Record	Site (attendance) city, state
Regular season
11/08/2013*; 7:00 pm	at Northern Illinois	W 68–66	1–0	Convocation Center (1,060); DeKalb, IL
11/10/2013*; 3:30 pm	at Iowa	L 75–83	1–1	Carver-Hawkeye Arena (14,271); Iowa City, IA
11/13/2013*; 7:07 pm	UMKC	W 101–71	2–1	Ralston Arena (1,363); Ralston, NE
11/15/2013*; 9:00 pm	at UNLV	L 70–73	2–2	Thomas & Mack Center (12,638); Paradise, NV
11/19/2013*; 7:07 pm	South Carolina State	W 91–59	3–2	Ralston Arena (873); Ralston, NE
11/23/2013*; 1:00 pm	at Drake	L 80–88	3–3	Knapp Center (3,467); Des Moines, IA
11/25/2013*; 6:30 pm	at South Carolina State	W 83–67	4–3	SHM Memorial Center (197); Orangeburg, SC
11/30/2013*; 1:00 pm	Iowa Wesleyan	W 86–36	5–3	Ralston Arena (663); Ralston, NE
12/03/2013*; 7:00 pm	Waldorf	W 100–66	6–3	Ralston Arena (733); Ralston, NE
12/10/2013*; 7:07 pm	Cal State Bakersfield	W 93–88	7–3	Ralston Arena (1,024); Ralston, NE
12/14/2013*; 5:05 pm	at Nevada	W 82–80	8–3	Lawlor Events Center (5,052); Reno, NV
12/20/2013*; 8:00 pm, BTN	at Minnesota	L 79–92	8–4	Williams Arena (11,890); Minneapolis, MN
12/22/2013*; 4:00 pm	Seattle	W 76–69	9–4	Ralston Arena (1,593); Ralston, NE
12/29/2013*; 1:00 pm	at Central Arkansas	W 104–88	10–4	Farris Center (423); Conway, AR
01/03/2014*; 11:55 pm	at Hawaiʻi	L 73–77	10–5	Stan Sheriff Center (6,128); Honolulu, HI
01/11/2014; 7:00 pm	at Western Illinois	L 72–79 ^{OT}	10–6 (0–1)	Western Hall (2,113); Macomb, IL
01/16/2014; 7:00 pm	at North Dakota State	L 69–91	10–7 (0–2)	Bison Sports Arena (3,274); Fargo, ND
01/18/2014; 4:00 pm, Midco	at South Dakota State	W 80–71	11–7 (1–2)	Frost Arena (3,274); Brookings, SD
01/23/2014; 7:00 pm, Midco/FCS	Denver	L 60–74	11–8 (1–3)	Ralston Arena (2,015); Ralston, NE
01/25/2014; 1:00 pm	South Dakota	W 77–73	12–8 (2–3)	Ralston Arena (1,514); Ralston, NE
01/30/2014; 6:00 pm	at IPFW	L 82–86	12–9 (2–4)	Gates Sports Center (684); Fort Wayne, IN
02/01/2014; 1:00 pm	at IUPUI	W 99–71	13–9 (3–4)	The Jungle (527); Indianapolis, IN
02/05/2014*; 1:00 pm	Peru State	W 86–62	14–9	Ralston Arena (258); Ralston, NE
02/08/2014; 1:00 pm	Western Illinois	W 71–60	15–9 (4–4)	Ralston Arena (1,083); Ralston, NE
02/13/2014; 7:00 pm	South Dakota State	L 60–77	15–10 (4–5)	Ralston Arena (1,376); Ralston, NE
02/15/2014; 4:00 pm, Midco/FCS	North Dakota State	L 59–75	15–11 (4–6)	Ralston Arena (2,276); Ralston, NE
02/20/2014; 7:00 pm, Midco	at South Dakota	L 86–87	15–12 (4–7)	DakotaDome (1,318); Vermillion, SD
02/22/2014; 5:00 pm	at Denver	L 60–72	15–13 (4–8)	Magness Arena (6,406); Denver, CO
02/27/2014; 7:00 pm	IUPUI	W 88–66	16–13 (5–8)	Ralston Arena (983); Ralston, NE
03/01/2014; 1:00 pm	IPFW	L 95–96 ^{OT}	16–14 (5–9)	Ralston Arena (1,242); Ralston, NE
CIT
03/19/2014*; 7:00 pm	North Dakota; First round	W 91–75	17–14	Ralston Arena (2,158); Ralston, NE
03/24/2014*; 7:00 pm	at Murray State; Second round	L 62–86	17–15	CFSB Center (3,254); Murray, KY
*Non-conference game. (#) Tournament seedings in parentheses. All times are in Central Time.
