= 2013–14 Denver Pioneers men's basketball team =

American college basketball season

2013–14 Denver Pioneers men's basketball
- Conference: The Summit League
- Record: 16–15 (8–6 The Summit)
- Head coach: Joe Scott (7th season)
- Assistant coaches: Mike McKee; John Fitzgerald; A.J. Kuhle
- Home arena: Magness Arena

2013–14 Summit League men's basketball standings
	Conf.				Overall
Team	W		L	PCT	W		L	PCT
North Dakota State †	12	–	2	.857	26	–	7	.788
IPFW	10	–	4	.714	25	–	11	.694
South Dakota State	10	–	4	.714	19	–	13	.594
Denver	8	–	6	.571	16	–	15	.516
South Dakota	6	–	8	.429	12	–	18	.400
Omaha *	5	–	9	.357	17	–	15	.531
Western Illinois	4	–	10	.286	10	–	20	.333
IUPUI	1	–	13	.071	6	–	26	.188
† 2014 Summit League tournament winner Rankings from AP poll *ineligible for NCAA postseason Div. I tournament due to Div. I transition

The 2013–14 Denver Pioneers men's basketball team represented the University of Denver during the 2013–14 NCAA Division I men's basketball season. The Pioneers, led by seventh year head coach Joe Scott, played their home games at Magness Arena and were first year members of The Summit League. They finished the season 16–15, 8–6 in The Summit League play to finish in fourth place. They advanced to the semifinals of The Summit League tournament where they lost to North Dakota State.

== Roster ==
Number	Name	Position	Height	Weight	Year	Hometown
3	Jalen Love	Guard	6–3	165	Sophomore	Wichita, Kansas
14	Duke Douglas	Guard	6–4	185	Freshman	New Orleans, Louisiana
20	Dorian Butler	Forward	6–6	225	Freshman	Riverside, California
21	Bryant Rucker	Guard	6–0	185	Sophomore	Frisco, Texas
22	Charles Webb	Guard	5–5	165	Senior	Erie, Colorado
23	Brett Olson	Guard	6–5	185	Junior	Highlands Ranch, Colorado
24	Dom Samac	Forward	6–9	200	Sophomore	Zagreb, Croatia
25	Jake Logan	Center	6–8	220	RS–Sophomore	Norwalk, Iowa
30	Cam Griffin	Guard	6–3	190	Junior	San Antonio, Texas
32	Drick Bernstine	Forward	6–8	220	Freshman	Aurora, Colorado
33	Nate Engesser	Guard	6–3	185	Sophomore	Colorado Springs, Colorado
34	Chris Udofia	Forward	6–6	200	Senior	Irving, Texas
35	Marcus Byrd	Forward	6–7	205	RS–Sophomore	Highlands Ranch, Colorado
44	Griffin McKenzie	Forward	6–9	235	RS–Junior	Cincinnati, Ohio

== Schedule ==
Date time, TV	Opponent	Result	Record	Site (attendance) city, state
Regular season
11/12/2013*; 9:00 pm, P12N	at California	L 50–77	0–1	Haas Pavilion (8,249); Berkeley, CA
11/17/2013*; 12:00 pm, RTRM	Stanford	L 57–66	0–2	Magness Arena (4,222); Denver, CO
11/28/2013*; 10:00 pm, CBSSN	vs. Harvard; Great Alaska Shootout First Round	L 60–68	0–3	Sullivan Arena (3,923); Anchorage, AK
11/29/2013*; 4:00 pm	vs. Pepperdine; Great Alaska Shootout Consolation 2nd Round	L 56–68	0–4	Sullivan Arena (3,926); Anchorage, AK
11/30/2013*; 2:00 pm	at Alaska–Anchorage; Great Alaska Shootout 7th Place Game	W 78–71	1–4	Sullivan Arena (3,859); Anchorage, AK
12/03/2013*; 7:00 pm	Southern	W 75–74 ^{OT}	2–4	Magness Arena (1,444); Denver, CO
12/07/2013*; 1:00 pm	at Mercer	L 63–64 ^{OT}	2–5	Hawkins Arena (1,827); Macon, GA
12/11/2013*; 7:00 pm, RTRM	at Colorado State	W 80–70	3–5	Moby Arena (3,968); Colorado Springs, CO
12/15/2013*; 2:00 pm, RTRM	Wyoming	W 64–61	4–5	Magness Arena (4,940); Denver, CO
12/17/2013*; 8:00 pm	Belmont	W 90–62	5–5	Magness Arena (1,003); Denver, CO
12/21/2013*; 2:00 pm	UC Irvine	L 50–63	5–6	Magness Arena (2,754); Denver, CO
12/28/2013*; 5:00 pm	vs. Alcorn State; Sun Bowl Invitational	W 67–49	6–6	Don Haskins Center (6,132); El Paso, TX
12/29/2013*; 7:00 pm	at UTEP; Sun Bowl Invitational	L 54–60 ^{2OT}	6–7	Don Haskins Center (6,244); El Paso, TX
12/31/2013*; 4:00 pm, RTRM	Saint Francis (PA)	W 83–61	7–7	Magness Arena (2,076); Denver, CO
01/04/2014*; 12:00 pm	at Saint Joseph's	L 52–53	7–8	Hagan Arena (4,076); Philadelphia, PA
01/11/2014; 3:00 pm, FCS	at South Dakota	L 54–59	7–9 (0–1)	DakotaDome (1,506); Vermillion, SD
01/16/2014; 7:00 pm	IPFW	L 64–67	7–10 (0–2)	Magness Arena (1,609); Denver, CO
01/18/2014; 4:00 pm	IUPUI	W 66–45	8–10 (1–2)	Magness Arena (3,547); Denver, CO
01/23/2014; 6:00 pm, FCS	at Nebraska–Omaha	W 74–60	9–10 (2–2)	Ralston Arena (2,015); Ralston, NE
01/25/2014; 6:00 pm	at Western Illinois	W 67–55	10–10 (3–2)	Western Hall (2,920); Macomb, IL
01/30/2014; 7:00 pm, RTRM	South Dakota State	L 73–74	10–11 (3–3)	Magness Arena (1,877); Denver, CO
02/01/2014; 4:00 pm	North Dakota State	W 67–63	11–11 (4–3)	Magness Arena (4,021); Denver, CO
02/08/2014; 4:00 pm, RTRM	South Dakota	W 75–67	12–11 (5–3)	Magness Arena (4,798); Denver, CO
02/13/2014; 5:00 pm	at IUPUI	L 49–59	12–12 (5–4)	The Jungle (478); Indianapolis, IN
02/15/2014; 5:00 pm	at IPFW	W 73–62	13–12 (6–4)	Gates Sports Center (979); Fort Wayne, IN
02/20/2014; 7:00 pm	Western Illinois	W 75–67	14–12 (7–4)	Magness Arena (1,846); Denver, CO
02/22/2014; 6:00 pm, RTRM	Nebraska–Omaha	W 72–60	15–12 (8–4)	Magness Arena (6,406); Denver, CO
02/27/2014; 6:00 pm, FCS	at South Dakota State	L 69–78	15–13 (8–5)	Frost Arena (2,743); Brookings, SD
03/01/2014; 6:00 pm	at North Dakota State	L 68–78	15–14 (8–6)	Bison Sports Arena (4,527); Fargo, ND
The Summit League tournament
03/09/2014; 5:00 pm, FCS Atlantic	vs. South Dakota; Quarterfinals	W 71–55	16–14	Sioux Falls Arena (6,647); Sioux Falls, SD
03/09/2014; 5:00 pm, FCS Atlantic	vs. North Dakota State; Semifinals	L 48–83	16–15	Sioux Falls Arena (6,769); Sioux Falls, SD
*Non-conference game. ^{#}Rankings from AP Poll. (#) Tournament seedings in parentheses. All times are in Mountain Time.
