= 2014 Summit League men's basketball tournament =

- Classification: Division I
- Season: 2013–14
- Teams: 7
- Site: Sioux Falls Arena; Sioux Falls, South Dakota
- Champions: North Dakota State (2nd title)
- Winning coach: Saul Phillips (2nd title)
- MVP: Taylor Braun (North Dakota State)
- Television: FCS Atlantic, Midco Sport Network, ESPN2

2013–14 Summit League men's basketball standings
	Conf.				Overall
Team	W		L	PCT	W		L	PCT
North Dakota State †	12	–	2	.857	26	–	7	.788
IPFW	10	–	4	.714	25	–	11	.694
South Dakota State	10	–	4	.714	19	–	13	.594
Denver	8	–	6	.571	16	–	15	.516
South Dakota	6	–	8	.429	12	–	18	.400
Omaha *	5	–	9	.357	17	–	15	.531
Western Illinois	4	–	10	.286	10	–	20	.333
IUPUI	1	–	13	.071	6	–	26	.188
† 2014 Summit League tournament winner Rankings from AP poll *ineligible for NCAA postseason Div. I tournament due to Div. I transition

The 2014 Summit League men's basketball tournament was the post-season men's basketball tournament for the Summit League, and took place March 8–11, 2014 at the Sioux Falls Arena in Sioux Falls, South Dakota. Teams were seeded by conference record, with tiebreakers used when necessary. The champion received an automatic bid to the 2014 NCAA tournament.

== Tiebreaking procedure ==
The following rules define the tiebreaking procedure for the Summit League tournament. If there are multiple ties, the ties shall be broken in descending order. Once a tie is broken using the procedures below, it shall remain broken for purposes of all future comparisons. Tiebreaker procedures are used only to determine seeds for the league tournament.

=== Two-team tiebreaking criteria ===
The following criteria are applied to break ties between two teams:

1. Results of head-to-head competition between the two tied teams.
2. Comparison of each tied team's record against the team occupying the highest position in the standings continuing down through the standings until a team gains an advantage.
3. When arriving at another group of tied teams while comparing records, use each team's record against the collective tied teams as a group (prior to that group's own tie-breaking procedure) rather than the performance against individual tied teams.
4. If a tie still cannot be broken after applying criteria (1), (2) and (3), it will be broken by comparing each tied team's Ratings Percentage Index (RPI) (based upon the RPIratings.com Report issued on the morning following the last regular season league game).

=== Multiple-team tiebreaking criteria ===
The following criteria are applied to break ties between more than two teams:

1. Results of each tied team's collective record against the other teams tied for the same position.
2. If multiple ties still remain, then each tied team's record shall be compared to the team or group (if two or more are tied) occupying the highest position in the standings continuing down through the standings until a team gains an advantage.
3. If the above results in two teams remaining, the two-team tiebreaker is used.
4. If a tie involving three or more teams still cannot be broken after applying criteria (1) and (2), it will be broken by comparing each tied team's RPI (based upon the RPIratings.com Report issued on the morning following the last regular season league game).

== Bracket ==
Quarterfinals; March 8–9; FCS Atlantic/ Midco Sport Network
4	Denver	71
5	South Dakota	55
2	IPFW	85
7	IUPUI	47
3	South Dakota State	71
6	Western Illinois	50

Semifinals; March 10; FCS Atlantic/ Midco Sport Network
1	North Dakota State	83
4	Denver	48
2	IPFW	64
3	South Dakota State	60

Final; March 11; ESPN2
1	North Dakota State	60
2	IPFW	57
