= 2013–14 South Dakota Coyotes men's basketball team =

American college basketball season

2013–14 South Dakota Coyotes men's basketball
- Conference: The Summit League
- Record: 12–18 (6–8 The Summit)
- Head coach: Joey James (1st (interim) season)
- Assistant coaches: Eric Johnson; Chris Kassin; Lloyd Williams
- Home arena: DakotaDome

2013–14 Summit League men's basketball standings
	Conf.				Overall
Team	W		L	PCT	W		L	PCT
North Dakota State †	12	–	2	.857	26	–	7	.788
IPFW	10	–	4	.714	25	–	11	.694
South Dakota State	10	–	4	.714	19	–	13	.594
Denver	8	–	6	.571	16	–	15	.516
South Dakota	6	–	8	.429	12	–	18	.400
Omaha *	5	–	9	.357	17	–	15	.531
Western Illinois	4	–	10	.286	10	–	20	.333
IUPUI	1	–	13	.071	6	–	26	.188
† 2014 Summit League tournament winner Rankings from AP poll *ineligible for NCAA postseason Div. I tournament due to Div. I transition

The 2013–14 South Dakota Coyotes men's basketball team represented the University of South Dakota during the 2013–14 NCAA Division I men's basketball season. The Coyotes, led by first year interim head coach and former assistant Joey James, played their home games at the DakotaDome and were members of The Summit League. They finished the season 12–18, 6–8 in The Summit League play to finish in fifth place. They lost in the quarterfinals of The Summit League tournament to Denver.

Interim head coach Joey James was not retained at the end of the season.

== Roster ==
Number	Name	Position	Height	Year	Hometown
1	Trey Norris	Guard	6–0	Sophomore	Grand Prairie, Texas
2	Bounama Keita	Center	6–10	Freshman	Saint-Louis, Senegal
4	Rico Thompson	Guard	6–2	Freshman	Lawton, Oklahoma
10	Vlad Stoicoviciu	Guard	6–5	Freshman	Bucharest, Romania
12	Brandon Bos	Guard	6–1	Junior	Markham, Ontario
13	Adam Thoseby	Guard	6–5	Sophomore	Melbourne, Australia
14	Casey Kasperbauer	Guard	6–1	Sophomore	Carroll, Iowa
21	Jack Foley	Guard	6–0	Junior	Centerville, South Dakota
23	Tyler Flack	Forward	6–7	Sophomore	Lakeville, Minnesota
24	Karim Rowson	Guard	6–5	Senior	New York City, New York
32	Tavian Pomlee	Guard/Forward	6–5	Junior	Davenport, Iowa
41	Eric Robertson	Forward	6–8	Sophomore	Wayzata, Minnesota
45	Austin Sparks	Forward	6–8	Freshman	Denver, Colorado
50	Trevor Gruis	Center	6–10	Senior	Ellsworth, Minnesota
55	Tyler Larson	Guard	6–3	Junior	Las Vegas, Nevada

== Schedule ==
Date time, TV	Opponent	Result	Record	Site (attendance) city, state
Regular season
11/09/2013*; 6:00 pm	at St. Bonaventure	L 46–68	0–1	Reilly Center (3,855); St. Bonaventure, NY
11/11/2013*; 6:00 pm	at Canisius	L 66–71	0–2	Koessler Athletic Center (1,579); Buffalo, NY
11/22/2013*; 9:00 pm, ROOT	at Wyoming	L 53–70	0–3	Arena-Auditorium (5,086); Laramie, WY
11/25/2013*; 7:00 pm	at Texas State	W 57–56	1–3	Strahan Coliseum (2,114); San Marcos, TX
11/30/2013*; 4:15 pm	Graceland	W 112–85	2–3	DakotaDome (1,325); Vermillion, SD
12/02/2013*; 7:00 pm	Utah Valley	W 71–67	3–3	DakotaDome (1,335); Vermillion, SD
12/05/2013*; 8:00 pm, ROOT	at Air Force	L 86–94	3–4	Clune Arena (1,599); Colorado Springs, CO
12/07/2013*; 8:15 pm, MSN	vs. Wyoming	L 66–67 ^{OT}	3–5	Rushmore Plaza Civic Center (3,356); Rapid City, SD
12/10/2013*; 7:00 pm, FSKC	at Kansas State	L 62–64	3–6	Bramlage Coliseum (11,612); Manhattan, KS
12/14/2013*; 7:00 pm	Green Bay	L 85–89	3–7	DakotaDome (1,735); Vermillion, SD
12/19/2013*; 6:00 pm	at Morehead State	L 83–102	3–8	Ellis Johnson Arena (1,392); Morehead, KY
12/29/2013*; 1:00 pm	at Youngstown State	L 59–85	3–9	Beeghly Center (1,872); Youngstown, OH
01/02/2014*; 7:00 pm	Cal State Northridge	W 76–75	4–9	DakotaDome (1,215); Vermillion, SD
01/04/2014*; 4:15 pm	Iowa Wesleyan	W 86–52	5–9	DakotaDome (N/A); Vermillion, SD
01/11/2014; 4:00 pm, MidcoSN/FCS	Denver	W 59–54	6–9 (1–0)	DakotaDome (1,506); Vermillion, SD
01/16/2014; 7:00 pm	IUPUI	W 69–57	7–9 (2–0)	DakotaDome (1,624); Vermillion, SD
01/18/2014; 4:00 pm	IPFW	W 75–61	8–9 (3–0)	DakotaDome (2,003); Vermillion, SD
01/23/2014; 7:00 pm	at Western Illinois	L 61–79	8–10 (3–1)	Western Hall (2,268); Macomb, IL
01/25/2014; 1:00 pm	at Nebraska–Omaha	L 73–77	8–11 (3–2)	Ralston Arena (1,514); Ralston, NE
01/30/2014; 7:00 pm, MidcoSN	North Dakota State	L 63–66	8–12 (3–3)	DakotaDome (1,756); Vermillion, SD
02/01/2014; 4:00 pm, MidcoSN	South Dakota State	L 68–70	8–13 (3–4)	DakotaDome (5,036); Vermillion, SD
02/04/2014*; 7:00 pm	Peru State	W 80–40	9–13	DakotaDome (1,236); Vermillion, SD
02/08/2014; 5:00 pm, ROOT	at Denver	L 67–75	9–14 (3–5)	Magness Arena (4,798); Denver, CO
02/13/2014; 6:00 pm	at IPFW	L 69–75	9–15 (3–6)	Gates Sports Center (687); Fort Wayne, IN
02/15/2014; 1:00 pm	at IUPUI	W 71–67	10–15 (4–6)	The Jungle (420); Indianapolis, IN
02/20/2014; 7:00 pm, MidcoSN	Nebraska–Omaha	W 87–86	11–15 (5–6)	DakotaDome (1,318); Vermillion, SD
02/22/2014; 4:00 pm, MidcoSN/FCS	Western Illinois	W 64–54	12–15 (6–6)	DakotaDome (2,102); Vermillion, SD
02/27/2014; 7:00 pm	at North Dakota State	L 54–82	12–16 (6–7)	Bison Sports Arena (3,804); Fargo, ND
03/01/2014; 4:00 pm, MidcoSN/FCS	at South Dakota State	L 61–75	12–17 (6–8)	Frost Arena (5,509); Brookings, SD
2014 The Summit League tournament
03/09/2014; 6:00 pm, FCS Atlantic	vs. Denver; Quarterfinals	L 55–71	12–18	Sioux Falls Arena (6,647); Sioux Falls, SD
*Non-conference game. ^{#}Rankings from AP Poll. (#) Tournament seedings in parentheses. All times are in Central Time.
