= Todd Howard (basketball) =

American college basketball head coach (born 1970)

Current position
- Title: Head coach

Biographical details
- Born: September 10, 1970 (age 56); Louisville, Kentucky, U.S.

Playing career
- 1989–1993: Louisville

Coaching career (HC unless noted)
- 1993–1994: Louisville (Student asst.)
- 1994–2000: IUPUI (asst.)
- 2001–2011: IUPUI (Assoc. HC)
- 2011–2014: IUPUI
- 2014–2024: Brebeuf Jesuit Prep
- 2024-Present: Marian University (Assoc. HC)

Head coaching record
- Overall: 26–70

Todd Howard (born September 10, 1970) is an American college basketball head coach who coached the IUPUI men's basketball team from 2011 to 2014. He is a graduate of the University of Louisville. Howard was hired after serving as an assistant to Ron Hunter for 17 seasons at IUPUI. Howard played under Coach Denny Crum at The University of Louisville, following a successful prep career at Ballard High School in Louisville.

After posting a 26–70 record in three seasons as head coach, Howard was fired from the IUPUI Jaguars on March 9, 2014. On May 12, 2014, he was hired as the head boys' basketball coach at Brebeuf Jesuit Preparatory School in Indianapolis, IN and serves as the coordinator of Brebeuf Jesuit's Ignatian Scholars Program.

== Head coaching record ==
Record table
Season	Team	Overall	Conference	Standing	Postseason
IUPUI Jaguars (The Summit League) (2011–2014)
2011–12	IUPUI	14–18	7–11	7th	
2012–13	IUPUI	6–26	1–15	9th	
2013–14	IUPUI	6–26	1–13	8th	
IUPUI:		26–70 (.271)	9–39 (.188)		
Total:		26–70 (.271)			
National champion Postseason invitational champion Conference regular season champion Conference regular season and conference tournament champion Division regular season champion Division regular season and conference tournament champion Conference tournament champion
