= 2013–14 Marshall Thundering Herd men's basketball team =

American college basketball season

2013–14 Marshall Thundering Herd men's basketball
- Conference: Conference USA
- Record: 11–22 (4–12 C-USA)
- Head coach: Tom Herrion (4th season)
- Assistant coaches: Mark Cline; Dino Presley; Josh King
- Home arena: Cam Henderson Center

2013–14 Conference USA men's basketball standings
	Conf.				Overall
Team	W		L	PCT	W		L	PCT
Louisiana Tech	13	–	3	.813	29	–	8	.784
Tulsa †	13	–	3	.813	21	–	13	.618
Middle Tennessee	13	–	3	.813	24	–	9	.727
Southern Miss	13	–	3	.813	29	–	7	.806
UTEP	12	–	4	.750	23	–	11	.676
Old Dominion	9	–	7	.563	18	–	18	.500
Tulane	8	–	8	.500	17	–	17	.500
UAB	7	–	9	.438	18	–	13	.581
Charlotte	7	–	9	.438	17	–	14	.548
FIU*	7	–	9	.438	15	–	16	.484
North Texas	6	–	10	.375	16	–	16	.500
Florida Atlantic	5	–	11	.313	10	–	22	.313
East Carolina	5	–	11	.313	17	–	17	.500
UTSA	4	–	12	.250	8	–	22	.267
Marshall	4	–	12	.250	11	–	22	.333
Rice	2	–	14	.125	7	–	23	.233
† 2014 C-USA Tournament winner Rankings from AP poll *Ineligible for postseason play due to APR penalties

The 2013–14 Marshall Thundering Herd Men's Basketball Team represented Marshall University during the 2013–14 NCAA Division I men's basketball season. The Thundering Herd, led by fourth year head coach Tom Herrion, played their home games at the Cam Henderson Center and were members of Conference USA. They finished the season 11–22, 4–12 in C-USA play to finish in a tie for fourteenth place. They advanced to the second round of the C-USA tournament where they lost to Old Dominion.

At the end of the season, head coach Tom Herrion's remaining contract was bought out. On April 24, the Herd hired alumnus and former NBA assistant coach Dan D'Antoni as head coach. D'Antoni was an assistant at Marshall 43 years prior in 1970–71.

== Preseason ==
=== Recruiting ===
College recruiting information
Name	Hometown	School	Height	Weight	Commit date
Jaylen Brantley; PG	Springfield, MA	Notre Dame Prep	5 ft 10 in (1.78 m)	150 lb (68 kg)	May 17, 2013
Jaylen Brantley; PG	Recruit ratings: Scout: Rivals: (N/A)				
Chris Thomas; SG	Marianna, FL	Chipola Junior College	6 ft 5 in (1.96 m)	180 lb (82 kg)	Aug 27, 2013
Chris Thomas; SG	Recruit ratings: Scout: Rivals: (JC)				
Shawn Smith; PG	San Francisco, CA	CC of San Francisco	6 ft 6 in (1.98 m)	220 lb (100 kg)	Apr 16, 2013
Shawn Smith; PG	Recruit ratings: Scout: Rivals: (JC)				
Cheikh Tidiane Sane; PF	Ephraim, UT	Snow College	6 ft 9 in (2.06 m)	217 lb (98 kg)	Apr 2, 2013
Cheikh Tidiane Sane; PF	Recruit ratings: Scout: Rivals: (JC)				
Justin Edmonds; SG	Albion, MI	Owens CC	6 ft 4 in (1.93 m)	205 lb (93 kg)	Mar 4, 2011
Justin Edmonds; SG	Recruit ratings: Scout: Rivals: (JC)				
Overall recruit ranking: Scout: NR Rivals: NR ESPN: NR
Note: In many cases, Scout, Rivals, 247Sports, On3, and ESPN may conflict in their listings of height and weight.; In these cases, the average was taken. ESPN grades are on a 100-point scale.; Sources: "2013 Team Ranking". Rivals.

== Roster ==
2013–14 Marshall Thundering Herd men's basketball team
Players
Coaches

Pos.	#	Name	Height	Weight	Year	Hometown
F	0	Shawn Smith	6 ft 6 in (1.98 m)	228 lb (103 kg)	Jr	Sacramento, California
G	1	Kareem Canty	6 ft 1 in (1.85 m)	185 lb (84 kg)	RS Fr	Harlem, New York
G	4	Kevin McNair (W)	6 ft 1 in (1.85 m)	180 lb (82 kg)	Fr	Atlanta, Georgia
F	13	Cheikh Sane	6 ft 9 in (2.06 m)	225 lb (102 kg)	Jr	Dakar, Senegal
G	15	DeVince Boykins	6 ft 4 in (1.93 m)	210 lb (95 kg)	RS So	Forest City, North Carolina
F	21	TyQuane Goard	6 ft 7 in (2.01 m)	215 lb (98 kg)	RS So	Charleston, West Virginia
G	23	Justin Edmonds	6 ft 4 in (1.93 m)	210 lb (95 kg)	Jr	Albion, Michigan
F	24	Elijah Pittman	6 ft 9 in (2.06 m)	220 lb (100 kg)	Sr	Covington, Kentucky
F	25	Ryan Taylor	6 ft 9 in (2.06 m)	225 lb (102 kg)	RS Fr	Indianapolis, Indiana
C	31	JP Kambola	6 ft 9 in (2.06 m)	244 lb (111 kg)	RS Jr	Toronto, Ontario, Canada
G	32	Tamron Manning	6 ft 4 in (1.93 m)	210 lb (95 kg)	So	Georgetown, Kentucky
C	34	Yous Mbao	7 ft 2 in (2.18 m)	250 lb (113 kg)	RS Sr	Rufisque, Senegal
G	35	Austin Loop	6 ft 4 in (1.93 m)	207 lb (94 kg)	RS Fr	South Webster, Ohio

Head coach

- Tom Herrion (Merrimack)

Assistant coach(es)

- Mark Cline (Wake Forest)
- Dino Presley (Kutztown)
- Josh King (Eckerd)

Legend

- (C) Team captain
- (S) Suspended
- (I) Ineligible
- (W) Walk-on
- Injured
- Current redshirt

Roster
Last update: 2012-10-09

== Schedule ==
Date time, TV	Rank^{#}	Opponent^{#}	Result	Record	Site (attendance) city, state
Exhibition
10/28/2013*; 7:00 pm		Concord	W 94–60		Cam Henderson Center (3,923); Huntington, WV
Regular season
11/08/2013*; 7:00 pm		South Carolina State	W 85–69	1–0	Cam Henderson Center (5,067); Huntington, WV
11/12/2013*; 7:00 pm		Rio Grande	W 119–77	2–0	Cam Henderson Center (4,761); Huntington, WV
11/17/2013*; 2:00 pm		at Morehead State	L 94–102	2–1	Ellis Johnson Arena (3,506); Morehead, KY
11/21/2013*; 7:00 pm		Stephen F. Austin	L 73–80 ^{OT}	2–2	Cam Henderson Center (4,863); Huntington, WV
11/23/2013*; 12:00 pm		UNC Wilmington	W 96–78	3–2	Cam Henderson Center (4,718); Huntington, WV
11/26/2013*; 7:00 pm		WKU	W 84–74	4–2	Cam Henderson Center (5,113); Huntington, WV
11/30/2013*; 4:00 pm		at East Tennessee State	L 78–88	4–3	Freedom Hall Civic Center (3,016); Johnson City, TN
12/05/2013*; 8:00 pm		at Vanderbilt	L 67–69	4–4	Memorial Gymnasium (8,240); Nashville, TN
12/07/2013*; 4:00 pm, ESPN3		at Penn State	L 77–90	4–5	Bryce Jordan Center (5,633); University Park, PA
12/14/2013*; 7:30 pm, WOWK		vs. West Virginia; Chesapeake Energy Capital Classic	L 64–74	4–6	Charleston Civic Center (11,038); Charleston, WV
12/17/2013*; 7:00 pm		Alice Lloyd	W 121–57	5–6	Cam Henderson Center (4,127); Huntington, WV
12/21/2013*; 7:00 pm		Arkansas State	L 82–83	5–7	Cam Henderson Center (4,718); Huntington, WV
12/30/2013*; 7:00 pm, CSS		at South Carolina	L 65–92	5–8	Colonial Life Arena (7,935); Columbia, SC
01/02/2014*; 7:00 pm		at Akron	L 58–59	5–9	James A. Rhodes Arena (3,784); Akron, OH
01/05/2014*; 2:00 pm		Presbyterian	W 77–49	6–9	Cam Henderson Center (4,358); Huntington, WV
01/09/2014; 8:00 pm		at UTSA	L 81–90	6–10 (0–1)	Convocation Center (813); San Antonio, TX
01/11/2014; 9:05 pm		at UTEP	L 56–66	6–11 (0–2)	Don Haskins Center (7,551); El Paso, TX
01/16/2014; 7:00 pm		North Texas	L 65–80	6–12 (0–3)	Cam Henderson Center (4,586); Huntington, WV
01/18/2014; 12:00 pm, CBSSN		Tulsa	L 52–69	6–13 (0–4)	Cam Henderson Center (4,637); Huntington, WV
01/23/2014; 8:00 pm		at Rice	W 73–63	7–13 (1–4)	Tudor Fieldhouse (1,254); Houston, TX
01/25/2014; 8:00 pm, CBSSN		at Louisiana Tech	L 77–98	7–14 (1–5)	Thomas Assembly Center (7,355); Ruston, LA
01/30/2014; 8:00 pm		FIU	W 80–68	8–14 (2–5)	Cam Henderson Center (4,551); Huntington, WV
02/01/2014; 12:00 pm, CSS		Florida Atlantic	L 57–65	8–15 (2–6)	Cam Henderson Center (4,802); Huntington, WV
02/07/2014; 9:30 pm, CBSSN		at Southern Miss	L 57–60	8–16 (2–7)	Reed Green Coliseum (4,839); Hattiesburg, MS
02/09/2014; 2:00 pm		at Tulane	L 65–68	8–17 (2–8)	Devlin Fieldhouse (1,775); New Orleans, LA
02/15/2014; 7:00 pm		at Charlotte	W 59–56	9–17 (3–8)	Halton Arena (5,525); Charlotte, NC
02/20/2014; 7:00 pm		UAB	L 62–68	9–18 (3–9)	Cam Henderson Center (4,784); Huntington, WV
02/22/2014; 2:00 pm, CSS		Middle Tennessee	L 53–56	9–19 (3–10)	Cam Henderson Center (5,092); Huntington, WV
02/27/2014; 7:00 pm		at Old Dominion	L 63–70	9–20 (3–11)	Ted Constant Convocation Center (6,230); Norfolk, VA
03/02/2014; 2:00 pm		East Carolina	W 64–61	10–20 (4–11)	Cam Henderson Center (4,291); Huntington, WV
03/06/2014; 7:00 pm, CBSSN		Charlotte	L 70–74	10–21 (4–12)	Cam Henderson Center (4,944); Huntington, WV
2014 Conference USA tournament
03/11/2014; 8:00 pm	(14)	vs. (11) Florida Atlantic; First round	W 63–59	11–21	Don Haskins Center (4,226); El Paso, TX
03/12/2014; 4:30 pm	(14)	vs. (6) Old Dominion; Second round	L 58–73	11–22	Don Haskins Center (3,916); El Paso, TX
*Non-conference game. ^{#}Rankings from AP poll. (#) Tournament seedings in parentheses. All times are in Eastern Time.
