= 2013–14 East Carolina Pirates men's basketball team =

American college basketball season

2013–14 East Carolina Pirates men's basketball

CIT, First round
- Conference: Conference USA
- Record: 17–17 (5–11 C-USA)
- Head coach: Jeff Lebo (4th season)
- Assistant coaches: Mike Netti; Michael Perry; Ken Potosnak
- Home arena: Williams Arena

2013–14 Conference USA men's basketball standings
	Conf.				Overall
Team	W		L	PCT	W		L	PCT
Louisiana Tech	13	–	3	.813	29	–	8	.784
Tulsa †	13	–	3	.813	21	–	13	.618
Middle Tennessee	13	–	3	.813	24	–	9	.727
Southern Miss	13	–	3	.813	29	–	7	.806
UTEP	12	–	4	.750	23	–	11	.676
Old Dominion	9	–	7	.563	18	–	18	.500
Tulane	8	–	8	.500	17	–	17	.500
UAB	7	–	9	.438	18	–	13	.581
Charlotte	7	–	9	.438	17	–	14	.548
FIU*	7	–	9	.438	15	–	16	.484
North Texas	6	–	10	.375	16	–	16	.500
Florida Atlantic	5	–	11	.313	10	–	22	.313
East Carolina	5	–	11	.313	17	–	17	.500
UTSA	4	–	12	.250	8	–	22	.267
Marshall	4	–	12	.250	11	–	22	.333
Rice	2	–	14	.125	7	–	23	.233
† 2014 C-USA Tournament winner Rankings from AP poll *Ineligible for postseason play due to APR penalties

The 2013–14 East Carolina Pirates men's basketball team represented East Carolina University during the 2013–14 NCAA Division I men's basketball season. The Pirates, led by fourth year head coach Jeff Lebo, played their home games at Williams Arena at Minges Coliseum and were members of Conference USA. They finished the season 17–17, 5–11 in C-USA play to finish in a tie for 12th place.

They advanced to the second round of the C-USA tournament where they lost to UTEP. They were invited to the CollegeInsider.com Tournament where they lost in the first round to Wright State.

The 2013–14 season was their final year as a member of Conference USA; East Carolina joined the American Athletic Conference in July 2014.

== Roster ==
Number	Name	Position	Height	Weight	Year	Hometown
0	Terry Whisnant	Guard	6–3	180	Junior	Cherryville, North Carolina
1	Akeem Richmond	Guard	6–0	180	Senior	Sanford, North Carolina
2	Caleb White	Guard	6–6	190	Freshman	Buckingham, Virginia
3	Petar Torlak	Guard	6–1	185	Senior	Belgrade, Serbia
4	Prince Williams	Guard	6–5	200	Sophomore	Raleigh, North Carolina
10	Francis Edosomwan	Guard	6–3	220	Junior	Charlotte, North Carolina
11	Antonio Robinson	Guard	6–4	175	Junior	Winston-Salem, North Carolina
13	Michel-Ofik Nzege	Forward	6–7	215	Sophomore	Geneva, Switzerland
15	Peyton Robbins	Guard	6–3	200	Sophomore	Raleigh, North Carolina
22	Paris Roberts-Campbell	Guard	6–3	185	Junior	Charlotte, North Carolina
24	Keith Armstrong	Forward	6–7	240	Junior	Raleigh, North Carolina
25	Brandan Stith	Forward	6–7	215	Freshman	Lawrenceville, Virginia
31	Greg Alexander	Guard	6–4	200	Freshman	Hampton, Virginia
34	Michael Zangari	Forward	6–9	230	Sophomore	Lewisberry, Pennsylvania
41	Marshall Guilmette	Forward	6–10	250	Sophomore	Kennesaw, Georgia

== Schedule ==
Date time, TV	Opponent	Result	Record	Site (attendance) city, state
Regular season
11/08/2013*; 8:00 pm	North Carolina Wesleyan	W 97–51	1–0	Williams Arena (5,345); Greenville, North Carolina
11/12/2013*; 7:00 pm	at UNC Greensboro	W 85–84	2–0	Greensboro Coliseum (3,217); Greensboro, North Carolina
11/14/2013*; 7:00 pm	Chowan	W 95–45	3–0	Williams Arena (4,437); Greenville, North Carolina
11/18/2013*; 9:30 pm	vs. Norfolk State; NIT Season Tip-Off First Round	W 76–74	4–0	Cameron Indoor Stadium (N/A); Durham, North Carolina
11/19/2013*; 6:00 pm, ESPNU	at No. 6 Duke; NIT Season Tip-Off semifinals	L 74–83	4–1	Cameron Indoor Stadium (9,314); Durham, North Carolina
11/25/2013*; 5:00 pm	vs. UNC Asheville; NIT Season Tip-Off consolation round	W 91–63	5–1	Ryan Center (869); Kingston, Rhode Island
11/19/2013*; 5:00 pm	vs. McNeese State; NIT Season Tip-Off consolation round	W 81–70	6–1	Ryan Center (N/A); Kingston, Rhode Island
12/01/2013*; 5:00 pm, WITN	UNC Wilmington	L 68–70	6–2	Williams Arena (3,992); Greenville, North Carolina
12/03/2013*; 7:00 pm	Fayetteville State	W 96–78	7–2	Williams Arena (4,137); Greenville, North Carolina
12/08/2013*; 2:00 pm	Mount Olive	W 77–75	8–2	Williams Arena (3,827); Greenville, North Carolina
12/14/2013*; 5:00 pm	North Carolina A&T	W 84–71	9–2	Williams Arena (4,438); Greenville, North Carolina
12/19/2013*; 7:00 pm	VMI	W 103–94	10–2	Williams Arena (3,870); Greenville, North Carolina
12/21/2013*; 12:00 pm, RSN	at NC State	L 79–90	10–3	PNC Arena (15,217); Raleigh, North Carolina
12/29/2013*; 2:00 pm	Georgia State	L 82–89	10–4	Williams Arena (4,309); Greenville, North Carolina
01/02/2014*; 7:00 pm	at Campbell	W 79–71	11–4	Gore Arena (2,865); Buies Creek, North Carolina
01/11/2014; 7:00 pm, WITN	Old Dominion	L 70–81	11–5 (0–1)	Williams Arena (5,328); Greenville, North Carolina
01/16/2014; 7:00 pm	at Florida Atlantic	L 67–78	11–6 (0–2)	FAU Arena (1,408); Boca Raton, Florida
01/18/2014; 5:30 pm	at FIU	L 64–68	11–7 (0–3)	U.S. Century Bank Arena (1,106); Miami
01/23/2014; 7:00 pm	Tulane	L 54–59	11–8 (0–4)	Williams Arena (4,281); Greenville, North Carolina
01/25/2014; 5:00 pm, WITN	Southern Miss	L 46–60	11–9 (0–5)	Williams Arena (5,214); Greenville, North Carolina
01/30/2014; 5:00 pm	Middle Tennessee	L 67–84	11–10 (0–6)	Williams Arena (4,411); Greenville, North Carolina
02/01/2014; 3:00 pm	at UAB	W 74–67	12–10 (1–6)	Bartow Arena (6,013); Birmingham, Alabama
02/06/2014; 9:00 pm, FS1	UTEP	L 47–58	12–11 (1–7)	Williams Arena (4,764); Greenville, North Carolina
02/06/2014; 5:00 pm	UTSA	W 81–71	13–11 (2–7)	Williams Arena (5,188); Greenville, North Carolina
02/13/2014; 5:00 pm	at Tulsa	L 58–76	13–12 (2–8)	Reynolds Center (4,194); Tulsa, Oklahoma
02/15/2014; 8:00 pm	at North Texas	L 51–53	13–13 (2–9)	Super Pit (5,352); Denton, Texas
02/20/2014; 7:00 pm	Louisiana Tech	W 75–68	14–13 (3–9)	Williams Arena (3,798); Greenville, North Carolina
02/22/2014; 7:00 pm	Rice	W 67–55	15–13 (4–9)	Williams Arena (5,023); Greenville, North Carolina
02/27/2014; 5:00 pm, FS1	Charlotte	W 75–68	16–13 (5–9)	Williams Arena (5,248); Greenville, North Carolina
03/02/2014; 2:00 pm	at Marshall	L 61–64	16–14 (5–10)	Cam Henderson Center (4,291); Huntington, West Virginia
03/06/2014; 7:00 pm	at Old Dominion	L 47–68	16–15 (5–11)	Constant Center (7,029); Norfolk, Virginia
Conference USA tournament
03/11/2014; 10:30 pm	vs. UTSA; First round	W 79–76	17–15	Don Haskins Center (4,226); El Paso, Texas
03/12/2014; 8:00 pm	at UTEP; Second round	L 68–77	17–16	Don Haskins Center (8,277); El Paso, Texas
CIT
03/18/2014*; 7:00 pm	Wright State; First round	L 59–73	17–17	Williams Arena (2,171); Greenville, North Carolina
*Non-conference game. ^{#}Rankings from AP Poll. (#) Tournament seedings in parentheses. All times are in Eastern Time.
