= 2013–14 Florida Atlantic Owls men's basketball team =

American college basketball season

2013–14 Florida Atlantic Owls men's basketball
- Conference: Conference USA
- Record: 10–22 (5–11 C-USA)
- Head coach: Mike Jarvis (6th season)
- Assistant coaches: Mike Jarvis II; Tim Kaine; Peter Gash
- Home arena: FAU Arena

2013–14 Conference USA men's basketball standings
	Conf.				Overall
Team	W		L	PCT	W		L	PCT
Louisiana Tech	13	–	3	.813	29	–	8	.784
Tulsa †	13	–	3	.813	21	–	13	.618
Middle Tennessee	13	–	3	.813	24	–	9	.727
Southern Miss	13	–	3	.813	29	–	7	.806
UTEP	12	–	4	.750	23	–	11	.676
Old Dominion	9	–	7	.563	18	–	18	.500
Tulane	8	–	8	.500	17	–	17	.500
UAB	7	–	9	.438	18	–	13	.581
Charlotte	7	–	9	.438	17	–	14	.548
FIU*	7	–	9	.438	15	–	16	.484
North Texas	6	–	10	.375	16	–	16	.500
Florida Atlantic	5	–	11	.313	10	–	22	.313
East Carolina	5	–	11	.313	17	–	17	.500
UTSA	4	–	12	.250	8	–	22	.267
Marshall	4	–	12	.250	11	–	22	.333
Rice	2	–	14	.125	7	–	23	.233
† 2014 C-USA Tournament winner Rankings from AP poll *Ineligible for postseason play due to APR penalties

The 2013–14 Florida Atlantic Owls men's basketball team represented Florida Atlantic University during the 2013–14 NCAA Division I men's basketball season. The Owls, led by sixth year head coach Mike Jarvis, played their home games at the FAU Arena, and were first year members of Conference USA. They finished the season 10–22, 5–11 in C-USA play to finish in a tie for twelfth place. They lost in the first round of the C-USA tournament to Marshall.

== Roster ==
Number	Name	Position	Height	Weight	Year	Hometown
1	D'Andre Johnson	Guard	6–0	185	Freshman	Detroit, Michigan
2	Marquan Botley	Guard	5–10	160	Freshman	Plano, Texas
3	Dragan Sekelja	Center	7–0	250	RS Senior	Zagreb, Croatia
5	Javier Lacunza	Forward	6–9	210	Sophomore	Pamplona, Spain
11	Justin Raffington	Center	6–9	245	RS Junior	Freiburg, Germany
12	Jackson Trapp	Guard	6–4	186	Sophomore	Orlando, Florida
15	Richard Morrow	Guard	6–4	198	RS Junior	Cleveland, Ohio
21	Tyler Pate	Guard	6–3	190	Freshman	Port Aransas, Texas
24	Brian Hornstein	Center/Forward	6–10	210	Junior	Dallas, Texas
25	Pablo Bertone	Guard	6–4	198	Senior	Arroyito, Argentina
44	Kelvin Penn	Forward	6–6	225	Junior	Steilacoom, Washington
50	Grant Pelchen	Center	6–11	225	Freshman	Jupiter, Florida

== Schedule ==
Date time, TV	Opponent	Result	Record	Site (attendance) city, state
Regular season
11/08/2013*; 7:00 pm	Ave Maria	W 86–51	1–0	FAU Arena (1,213); Boca Raton, Florida
11/11/2013*; 7:00 pm	St. Francis Brooklyn	L 57–59	1–1	FAU Arena (1,332); Boca Raton, Florida
11/15/2013*; 7:00 pm	at No. 4 Duke	L 64–97	1–2	Cameron Indoor Stadium (9,314); Durham, NC
11/17/2013*; 8:00 pm, ESPNU	at Boston College; 2K Sports Classic	L 79–82	1–3	Conte Forum (1,653); Chestnut Hill, MA
11/22/2013*; 5:30 pm	at Detroit; 2K Sports Classic	L 44–77	1–4	Calihan Hall (2,221); Detroit, MI
11/23/2013*; 4:00 pm	vs. Stony Brook; 2K Sports Classic	L 61–67	1–5	Calihan Hall (N/A); Detroit, MI
11/24/2013*; 2:30 pm	vs. Toledo; 2K Sports Classic	L 74–94	1–6	Calihan Hall (N/A); Detroit, MI
12/03/2013*; 7:00 pm	Central Florida	W 75–64	2–6	FAU Arena (1,655); Boca Raton, Florida
12/07/2013*; 3:00 pm	Jacksonville	W 83–63	3–6	FAU Arena (1,195); Boca Raton, Florida
12/12/2013*; 9:00 pm, FS1	at DePaul	L 70–81	3–7	Allstate Arena (5,564); Rosemont, IL
12/14/2013*; 2:00 pm, RSN	at Maryland	L 62–66	3–8	Comcast Center (9,265); College Park, MD
12/17/2013*; 7:30 pm	at Stetson	L 62–64	3–9	Edmunds Center (255); DeLand, FL
12/22/2013*; 1:00 pm	Elon	L 62–67	3–10	FAU Arena (908); Boca Raton, Florida
01/01/2014*; 2:00 pm	Warner	W 81–47	4–10	FAU Arena (895); Boca Raton, Florida
01/09/2014; 7:30 pm	at Louisiana Tech	L 64–84	4–11 (0–1)	Thomas Assembly Center (2,678); Ruston, LA
01/11/2014; 8:00 pm	at Rice	W 73–68	5–11 (1–1)	Tudor Fieldhouse (1,276); Houston, TX
01/16/2014; 7:00 pm	East Carolina	W 78–67	6–11 (2–1)	FAU Arena (1,408); Boca Raton, Florida
01/18/2014; 7:00 pm	Old Dominion	L 60–65	6–12 (2–2)	FAU Arena (1,482); Boca Raton, Florida
01/21/2014*; 7:00 pm	Harvard	W 68–53	7–12	FAU Arena (2,315); Boca Raton, Florida
01/25/2014; 6:00 pm, CSS	at FIU	L 57–66	7–13 (2–3)	U.S. Century Bank Arena (2,044); Miami, Florida
01/30/2014; 7:30 pm	at Charlotte	L 53–62	7–14 (2–4)	Halton Arena (4,619); Charlotte, NC
02/01/2014; 12:00 pm, CSS	at Marshall	W 65–57	8–14 (3–4)	Cam Henderson Center (4,802); Huntington, WV
02/06/2014; 7:00 pm	Middle Tennessee	L 63–67	8–15 (3–5)	FAU Arena (1,328); Boca Raton, Florida
02/08/2014; 7:00 pm	UAB	W 82–71	9–15 (4–5)	FAU Arena (1,131); Boca Raton, Florida
02/13/2014; 9:05 pm	at UTEP	W 71–69	10–15 (5–5)	Don Haskins Center (10,508); El Paso, TX
02/15/2014; 7:00 pm	at UTSA	L 56–66	10–16 (5–6)	Convocation Center (1,209); San Antonio, TX
02/20/2014; 7:00 pm	Tulsa	L 52–71	10–17 (5–7)	FAU Arena (1,101); Boca Raton, Florida
02/22/2014; 7:00 pm	North Texas	L 76–78	10–18 (5–8)	FAU Arena (N/A); Boca Raton, Florida
02/26/2014; 9:00 pm	at Tulane	L 64–72	10–19 (5–9)	Devlin Fieldhouse (1,350); New Orleans, LA
03/02/2014; 9:00 pm	Southern Miss	L 49–60	10–20 (5–10)	FAU Arena (1,425); Boca Raton, Florida
03/06/2014; 7:00 pm	FIU	L 70–74	10–21 (5–11)	FAU Arena (1,374); Boca Raton, Florida
2014 Conference USA tournament
03/11/2014; 8:00 pm	vs. Marshall; First round	L 59–63	10–22	Don Haskins Center (4,226); El Paso, TX
*Non-conference game. ^{#}Rankings from AP Poll. (#) Tournament seedings in parentheses. All times are in Eastern Time.
