= 2013–14 Tulane Green Wave men's basketball team =

American college basketball season

2013–14 Tulane Green Wave men's basketball
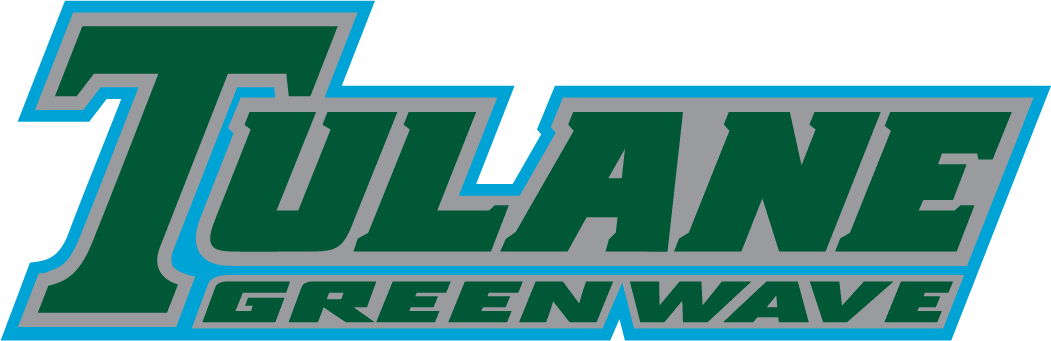

CBI first round vs. Princeton, L 55–56
- Conference: Conference USA
- Record: 17–17 (8–8 C-USA)
- Head coach: Ed Conroy (4th season)
- Assistant coaches: Doug Novak; Andy Fox; Shammond Williams
- Home arena: Devlin Fieldhouse

2013–14 Conference USA men's basketball standings
	Conf.				Overall
Team	W		L	PCT	W		L	PCT
Louisiana Tech	13	–	3	.813	29	–	8	.784
Tulsa †	13	–	3	.813	21	–	13	.618
Middle Tennessee	13	–	3	.813	24	–	9	.727
Southern Miss	13	–	3	.813	29	–	7	.806
UTEP	12	–	4	.750	23	–	11	.676
Old Dominion	9	–	7	.563	18	–	18	.500
Tulane	8	–	8	.500	17	–	17	.500
UAB	7	–	9	.438	18	–	13	.581
Charlotte	7	–	9	.438	17	–	14	.548
FIU*	7	–	9	.438	15	–	16	.484
North Texas	6	–	10	.375	16	–	16	.500
Florida Atlantic	5	–	11	.313	10	–	22	.313
East Carolina	5	–	11	.313	17	–	17	.500
UTSA	4	–	12	.250	8	–	22	.267
Marshall	4	–	12	.250	11	–	22	.333
Rice	2	–	14	.125	7	–	23	.233
† 2014 C-USA Tournament winner Rankings from AP poll *Ineligible for postseason play due to APR penalties

The 2013–14 Tulane Green Wave men's basketball team represented Tulane University during the 2013–14 NCAA Division I men's basketball season. The Green Wave, led by fourth-year head coach Ed Conroy, played their home games at Devlin Fieldhouse and were members of Conference USA. They finished the season 17–17, 8–8 in C-USA play to finish in seventh place.

They advanced to the quarterfinals of the C-USA tournament where they lost to Tulsa. They were invited to the College Basketball Invitational where the lost in the first round to Princeton.

This was their final year in Conference USA as they prepared to move to the American Athletic Conference in July 2014.

== Roster ==
Number	Name	Position	Height	Weight	Year	Hometown
0	Louis Dabney	G	6'3"	210	Sophomore	New Orleans, LA
2	Jonathan Stark	G	6'0"	160	Freshman	Munford, TN
3	Kajon Mack	G	6'3"	185	Sophomore	Los Angeles, CA
4	Mikael Herbert	F	6'9"	210	Freshman	Uusikaupunki, Finland
5	Cameron Reynolds	G	6'6"	195	Freshman	Pearland, Texas
10	Cole Currie	G	6'3"	185	Freshman	La Crescenta, California
11	Josh Hearlihy	G/F	6'7"	215	Freshman	Los Angeles, California
12	Max Keenan	G	6'2"	185	Senior	Washington, D.C.
15	Ryan Smith	C	6'10"	240	Freshman	Wildomar, California
20	Kevin Thomas	F	6'9"	225	Senior	Waco, TX
24	Jay Hook	G	6'3"	178	Junior	Waco, TX
25	Payton Henson	F	6'8"	220	Freshman	Siloam Springs, AR
32	Ray Barreno	C	6'11"	260	Freshman	Ascension Chihuahua, MX
34	Trevante Drye	F	6'6"	218	Junior	Baton Rouge, LA
41	Tomas Bruha	C	7'0"	235	RS Senior	Prague, Czech Republic

== Schedule ==
Date time, TV	Opponent	Result	Record	Site (attendance) city, state
Exhibition
11/03/2013*; 7:00 pm	Loyola (New Orleans)	W 103–74	–	Devlin Fieldhouse (1,557); New Orleans, LA
Regular season
11/08/2013*; 8:00 pm	NJIT	W 75–64	1–0	Devlin Fieldhouse (1,480); New Orleans, LA
11/13/2013*; 7:00 pm	at Southern	W 79–73	2–0	F. G. Clark Center (2,796); Baton Rouge, LA
11/16/2013*; 7:00 pm	Loyola–Chicago	W 65–59	3–0	Devlin Fieldhouse (1,552); New Orleans, LA
11/20/2013*; 12:00 pm	Cedarville; Cure UCD Classic	W 68–58	4–0	Devlin Fieldhouse (3,316); New Orleans, LA
11/23/2013*; 9:00 pm	Northern Kentucky; Cure UCD Classic	L 86–91 ^{OT}	4–1	Devlin Fieldhouse (1,437); New Orleans, LA
11/26/2013*; 7:00 pm	Colgate	L 86–98	4–2	Devlin Fieldhouse (1,502); New Orleans, LA
11/29/2013*; 4:00 pm	vs. Texas State; Cure UCD Classic	L 52–70	4–3	Puerto Vallarta International Convention Center (100); Puerto Vallarta, MX
11/30/2013*; 4:00 pm	vs. SE Missouri State; Cure UCD Classic	L 72–102	4–4	Puerto Vallarta International Convention Center (100); Puerto Vallarta, MX
12/04/2013*; 6:00 pm, ESPN3	at Wake Forest	L 57–72	4–5	LJVM Coliseum (6,176); Winston-Salem, NC
12/07/2013*; 2:00 pm	Jackson State	W 70–65	5–5	Devlin Fieldhouse (1,462); New Orleans, LA
12/17/2013*; 7:00 pm	Washington	L 62–73	5–6	Devlin Fieldhouse (1,646); New Orleans, LA
12/21/2013*; 3:00 pm	Alabama State; Tulane Classic	W 84–66	6–6	Devlin Fieldhouse (2,001); New Orleans, LA
12/22/2013*; 5:00 pm	Northeastern; Tulane Classic	W 65–62	7–6	Devlin Fieldhouse (2,111); New Orleans, LA
12/28/2013*; 4:30 pm, FS2	vs. Kansas State; Brooklyn Holiday Winter Festival	L 41–72	7–7	Barclays Center (7,203); Brooklyn, NY
01/02/2014*; 4:30 pm	Hofstra	W 61–58	8–7	Devlin Fieldhouse (1,391); New Orleans, LA
01/09/2014; 8:30 pm, CSS	at Tulsa	L 71–97	8–8 (0–1)	Reynolds Center (3,910); Tulsa, OK
01/11/2014; 1:00 pm, CSS	at North Texas	W 73–62	9–8 (1–1)	The Super Pit (1,969); Denton, TX
01/16/2014; 7:00 pm, CST	Louisiana Tech	L 45–75	9–9 (1–2)	Devlin Fieldhouse (2,006); New Orleans, LA
01/18/2014; 7:00 pm	Rice	W 58–41	10–9 (2–2)	Devlin Fieldhouse (1,531); New Orleans, LA
01/23/2014; 6:00 pm	at East Carolina	W 59–54	11–9 (3–2)	Williams Arena (4,281); Greenville, NC
01/25/2014; 6:00 pm	at Old Dominion	L 64–70	11–10 (3–3)	Ted Constant Convocation Center (6,512); Norfolk, VA
02/01/2014; 6:00 pm	at Southern Miss	L 47–78	11–11 (3–4)	Reed Green Coliseum (5,405); Hattiesburg, MS
02/07/2014; 7:00 pm	Charlotte	W 64–63	12–11 (4–4)	Devlin Fieldhouse (1,543); New Orleans, LA
02/09/2014; 1:00 pm	Marshall	W 68–65	13–11 (5–4)	Devlin Fieldhouse (1,775); New Orleans, LA
02/13/2014; 7:00 pm	at Middle Tennessee	L 44–71	13–12 (5–5)	Murphy Center (4,098); Murfreesboro, TN
02/15/2014; 7:00 pm	at UAB	W 86–80	14–12 (6–5)	Bartow Arena (5,276); Birmingham, AL
02/20/2014; 7:00 pm	UTEP	L 54–72	14–13 (6–6)	Devlin Fieldhouse (1,606); New Orleans, LA
02/22/2014; 7:00 pm	UTSA	W 68–56	15–13 (7–6)	Devlin Fieldhouse (1,572); New Orleans, LA
02/26/2014; 8:00 pm	Florida Atlantic	W 72–64	16–13 (8–6)	Devlin Fieldhouse (1,350); New Orleans, LA
03/02/2014; 8:00 pm	at FIU	L 47–73	16–14 (8–7)	U.S. Century Bank Arena (1,029); Miami, FL
03/06/2014; 7:00 pm	Southern Miss	L 51–68	16–15 (8–8)	Devlin Fieldhouse (1,906); New Orleans, LA
Conference USA tournament
03/12/2014; 1:00 pm	vs. North Texas; Second round	W 66–61	17–15	Don Haskins Center (4,226); El Paso, TX
03/13/2014; 1:00 pm	vs. Tulsa; Quarterfinals	L 49–70	17–16	Don Haskins Center (N/A); El Paso, TX
CBI
03/19/2014*; 7:00 pm	Princeton; First round	L 55–56	17–17	Devlin Fieldhouse (670); New Orleans, LA
*Non-conference game. ^{#}Rankings from AP Poll. (#) Tournament seedings in parentheses. All times are in Central Time.
