= 2013–14 Tulsa Golden Hurricane men's basketball team =

American college basketball season

2013–14 Tulsa Golden Hurricane men's basketball

Conference USA Regular Season Co-champions Conference USA tournament champions

NCAA tournament, round of 64
- Conference: Conference USA
- Record: 21–13 (13–3 C-USA)
- Head coach: Danny Manning (2nd season)
- Assistant coaches: Brett Ballard; Wendell Moore; Steve Woodberry
- Home arena: Reynolds Center

2013–14 Conference USA men's basketball standings
	Conf.				Overall
Team	W		L	PCT	W		L	PCT
Louisiana Tech	13	–	3	.813	29	–	8	.784
Tulsa †	13	–	3	.813	21	–	13	.618
Middle Tennessee	13	–	3	.813	24	–	9	.727
Southern Miss	13	–	3	.813	29	–	7	.806
UTEP	12	–	4	.750	23	–	11	.676
Old Dominion	9	–	7	.563	18	–	18	.500
Tulane	8	–	8	.500	17	–	17	.500
UAB	7	–	9	.438	18	–	13	.581
Charlotte	7	–	9	.438	17	–	14	.548
FIU*	7	–	9	.438	15	–	16	.484
North Texas	6	–	10	.375	16	–	16	.500
Florida Atlantic	5	–	11	.313	10	–	22	.313
East Carolina	5	–	11	.313	17	–	17	.500
UTSA	4	–	12	.250	8	–	22	.267
Marshall	4	–	12	.250	11	–	22	.333
Rice	2	–	14	.125	7	–	23	.233
† 2014 C-USA Tournament winner Rankings from AP poll *Ineligible for postseason play due to APR penalties

The 2013–14 Tulsa Golden Hurricane men's basketball team represented the University of Tulsa during the 2013–14 NCAA Division I men's basketball season. The Golden Hurricane, led by second year head coach Danny Manning, played their home games at the Reynolds Center and were members of Conference USA. They finished the season 21–13, 13–3 in C-USA play to finish in a four way tie for the C-USA regular season championship. They were champions of the C-USA tournament to earn an automatic bid to the NCAA tournament where they lost in the second round to UCLA.

This was their final year in C-USA as they moved to the American Athletic Conference in July 2014.

== Roster ==
Number	Name	Position	Height	Weight	Year	Hometown
0	Barrett Hunter	Guard	6–0	178	Senior	McLean, Virginia
1	Rashad Smith	Forward	6–7	206	RS Sophomore	Plano, Texas
2	Pat Swilling, Jr.	Guard	6–3	225	Senior	New Orleans, Louisiana
3	Rashad Ray	Guard	5–11	170	Sophomore	New Orleans, Louisiana
4	Riley Kemmer	Forward	6–7	207	Freshman	Wichita, Kansas
5	Tim Peete	Guard	6–4	205	Senior	Memphis, Tennessee
10	James Woodard	Guard	6–3	183	Sophomore	Edmond, Oklahoma
11	Shaquille Harrison	Guard	6–3	175	Sophomore	Kansas City, Missouri
12	Lew Evans	Forward	6–8	230	Sophomore	Salt Lake City, Utah
14	Tarekeyi Edogi	Forward	6–8	210	Freshman	Surprise, Arizona
15	Marquel Curtis	Guard/Forward	6–4	210	Junior	Plymouth, Minnesota
22	Nick Wood	Guard	6–0	170	Sophomore	Tulsa, Oklahoma
23	Stevie Repichowski	Guard	6–5	181	Freshman	Lansing, Michigan
40	D'Andre Wright	Forward	6–9	247	Sophomore	Lawton, Oklahoma
44	Brandon Swannegan	Forward	6–8	205	Sophomore	Houston, Texas
55	Emmanuel Ezechinonso	Forward	6–11	275	Freshman	Lagos, Nigeria

== Schedule ==
Date time, TV	Rank^{#}	Opponent^{#}	Result	Record	Site (attendance) city, state
Exhibition
October 31, 2013*; 8:05 pm		Haskell Indian Nations	W 118–55	–	Reynolds Center (4,280); Tulsa, OK
Regular season
November 10, 2013*; 5:05 pm		Oral Roberts; Rivalry	L 68–74	0–1	Reynolds Center (6,160); Tulsa, OK
November 16, 2013*; 7:05 pm, ESPN3		at Missouri State	L 93–96	0–2	JQH Arena (6,236); Springfield, MO
November 20, 2013*; 7:00 pm, CBSSN		No. 14 Wichita State	L 54–77	0–3	Reynolds Center (5,446); Tulsa, OK
November 23, 2013*; 7:00 pm, FSN		at Creighton	L 72–82	0–4	CenturyLink Center (18,078); Omaha, NE
November 27, 2013*; 10:30 pm, CBSSN		vs. Indiana State; Great Alaska Shootout First Round	W 63–62	1–4	Sullivan Arena (3,922); Anchorage, AK
November 29, 2013*; 8:30 pm, CBSSN		vs. TCU; Great Alaska Shootout semifinals	L 65–72	1–5	Sullivan Arena (3,940); Anchorage, AK
November 30, 2013*; 9:00 pm, CBSSN		vs. Green Bay; Great Alaska Shootout 3rd place game	L 59–67	1–6	Sullivan Arena (4,107); Anchorage, AK
December 4, 2013*; 7:05 pm		Texas Southern	W 98–71	2–6	Reynolds Center (3,806); Tulsa, OK
December 10, 2013*; 7:00 pm		Arkansas–Little Rock	W 78–64	3–6	Reynolds Center (3,780); Tulsa, OK
December 14, 2013*; 4:00 pm		at Oklahoma	L 91–101	3–7	Lloyd Noble Center (10,763); Norman, OK
December 18, 2013*; 7:05 pm		Grand Canyon	W 66–65	4–7	Reynolds Center (4,191); Tulsa, OK
December 21, 2013*; 11:00 am, FSSW+		at TCU	L 58–70	4–8	Daniel–Meyer Coliseum (4,066); Fort Worth, TX
December 29, 2013*; 6:00 pm, ESPNU		at Maryland	L 74–85	4–9	Comcast Center (10,251); Maryland, MD
January 4, 2014*; 12:00 pm		Cal State Fullerton	W 73–57	5–9	Reynolds Center (4,214); Tulsa, OK
January 9, 2014; 8:00 pm, CSS		Tulane	W 97–71	6–9 (1–0)	Reynolds Center (3,910); Tulsa, OK
January 12, 2014; 12:00 pm, FS1		Southern Miss	W 75–71	7–9 (2–0)	Reynolds Center (4,221); Tulsa, OK
January 16, 2014; 6:00 pm		at Charlotte	L 86–90 ^{OT}	7–10 (2–1)	Halton Arena (5,043); Charlotte, NC
January 18, 2014; 11:00 am, CBSSN		at Marshall	W 69–52	8–10 (3–1)	Cam Henderson Center (4,637); Huntington, WV
January 23, 2014; 8:00 pm, FS1		Middle Tennessee	W 58–53	9–10 (4–1)	Reynolds Center (4,179); Tulsa, OK
January 25, 2014; 3:05 pm		UAB	L 63–70	9–11 (4–2)	Reynolds Center (4,827); Tulsa, OK
February 1, 2014; 3:05 pm		North Texas	W 94–63	10–11 (5–2)	Reynolds Center (4,425); Tulsa, OK
February 6, 2014; 8:00 pm, CBSSN		at Louisiana Tech	L 61–66	10–12 (5–3)	Thomas Assembly Center (4,935); Ruston, LA
February 8, 2014; 3:00 pm, CSS		at Rice	W 66–56	11–12 (6–3)	Tudor Fieldhouse (1,757); Houston, TX
February 13, 2014; 7:05 pm		East Carolina	W 76–58	12–12 (7–3)	Reynolds Center (4,194); Tulsa, OK
February 15, 2014; 3:05 pm		Old Dominion	W 76–37	13–12 (8–3)	Reynolds Center (4,609); Tulsa, OK
February 20, 2014; 6:00 pm		at Florida Atlantic	W 71–52	14–12 (9–3)	FAU Arena (1,101); Boca Raton, FA
February 22, 2014; 1:00 pm		at FIU	W 77–65	15–12 (10–3)	U.S. Century Bank Arena (862); Miami, FL
February 27, 2014; 8:05 pm		at UTEP	W 65–60	16–12 (11–3)	Don Haskins Center (11,019); El Paso, TX
March 2, 2014; 3:05 pm		UTSA	W 72–70 ^{OT}	17–12 (12–3)	Reynolds Center (5,427); Tulsa, OK
March 6, 2014; 7:00 pm		at North Texas	W 79–68	18–12 (13–3)	The Super Pit (1,841); Denton, TX
Conference USA tournament
March 13, 2014; 1:00 pm		vs. Tulane; Quarterfinals	W 70–49	19–12	Don Haskins Center (N/A); El Paso, TX
March 14, 2014; 3:00 pm, CBSSN		vs. Middle Tennessee; Semifinals	W 76–69	20–12	Don Haskins Center (5,611); El Paso, TX
March 15, 2014; 10:35 am, CBS		vs. Louisiana Tech; Championship	W 69–60	21–12	Don Haskins Center (4,870); El Paso, TX
NCAA tournament
March 21, 2014*; 8:57 pm, truTV	(13 S)	vs. (4 S) No. 20 UCLA; Second round	L 59–76	21–13	Viejas Arena (11,488); San Diego, CA
*Non-conference game. ^{#}Rankings from AP Poll, (#) during NCAA Tournament is seed within region S=South. (#) Tournament seedings in parentheses. All times are in Central Time.
