= 2013–14 UTSA Roadrunners men's basketball team =

American college basketball season

2013–14 UTSA Roadrunners men's basketball
- Conference: Conference USA
- Record: 8–22 (4–12 C-USA)
- Head coach: Brooks Thompson (8th season)
- Assistant coaches: Dan O'Dowd; Robert Guster; Jeff Renegar
- Home arena: Convocation Center

2013–14 Conference USA men's basketball standings
	Conf.				Overall
Team	W		L	PCT	W		L	PCT
Louisiana Tech	13	–	3	.813	29	–	8	.784
Tulsa †	13	–	3	.813	21	–	13	.618
Middle Tennessee	13	–	3	.813	24	–	9	.727
Southern Miss	13	–	3	.813	29	–	7	.806
UTEP	12	–	4	.750	23	–	11	.676
Old Dominion	9	–	7	.563	18	–	18	.500
Tulane	8	–	8	.500	17	–	17	.500
UAB	7	–	9	.438	18	–	13	.581
Charlotte	7	–	9	.438	17	–	14	.548
FIU*	7	–	9	.438	15	–	16	.484
North Texas	6	–	10	.375	16	–	16	.500
Florida Atlantic	5	–	11	.313	10	–	22	.313
East Carolina	5	–	11	.313	17	–	17	.500
UTSA	4	–	12	.250	8	–	22	.267
Marshall	4	–	12	.250	11	–	22	.333
Rice	2	–	14	.125	7	–	23	.233
† 2014 C-USA Tournament winner Rankings from AP poll *Ineligible for postseason play due to APR penalties

The 2013–14 UTSA Roadrunners men's basketball team represented the University of Texas at San Antonio during the 2013–14 NCAA Division I men's basketball season. The Roadrunners, led by eighth year head coach Brooks Thompson, played their home games at the Convocation Center and were first year members of Conference USA. They finished the season 8–22, 4–12 in C-USA play to finish in a tie for fourteenth place. They lost in the first round of the C-USA tournament to East Carolina.

== Roster ==
Number	Name	Position	Height	Weight	Year	Hometown
0	James Williams	Guard	6–4	190	Sophomore	Arlington, Texas
1	Devon Agusi	Guard	6–0	170	Senior	Dallas, Texas
2	Hyjii Thomas	Guard	6–1	160	Senior	Houston, Texas
4	Danté Willis	Guard	6–3	185	Sophomore	Kingwood, Texas
11	Trey Moore	Guard	5–10	175	Freshman	Louisville, Kentucky
12	Jeromie Hill	Forward	6–8	230	Senior	Cairns, Australia
15	Lucas O'Brien	Center	6–10	220	Freshman	Chandler, Arizona
20	Edrico McGregor	Forward/Center	6–7	225	Senior	Nassau, Bahamas
22	George Matthews	Guard	6–5	220	Junior	Phoenix, Arizona
24	Phillip Jones	Forward	6–6	200	Freshman	Freeport, Bahamas
32	Jordan Sims	Guard/Forward	6–4	185	Senior	El Mirage, Arizona
34	Larry Lewis	Guard	6–2	175	Freshman	Scottsdale, Arizona
42	Tyler Wood	Forward	6–6	230	Senior	San Antonio, Texas
44	Keon Lewis	Guard	6–2	180	Junior	Seattle, Washington
45	Kaj-Bjorn Sherman	Center	7–0	250	Junior	Mercer Island, Washington

== Schedule ==
Date time, TV	Opponent	Result	Record	Site (attendance) city, state
Exhibition
10/31/2013*; 7:00 pm	Southeastern Oklahoma State	W 80–60	–	Convocation Center (787); San Antonio, TX
Regular season
11/09/2013*; 7:00 pm	Northern Arizona	L 63–74	0–1	Convocation Center (1,044); San Antonio, TX
11/14/2013*; 7:00 pm, ESPN3	at Houston	L 62–80	0–2	Hofheinz Pavilion (2,800); Houston, TX
11/18/2013*; 7:00 pm	McMurry	L 71–73	0–3	Convocation Center (703); San Antonio, TX
11/21/2013*; 7:00 pm	Texas–Pan American	L 55–70	0–4	Convocation Center (777); San Antonio, TX
11/23/2013*; 2:00 pm	Texas A&M–Corpus Christi	W 87–76	1–4	Convocation Center (815); San Antonio, TX
11/26/2013*; 6:30 pm	at Nicholls State	L 73–79	1–5	Stopher Gym (296); Thibodaux, LA
11/29/2013*; 7:00 pm, FCS	at Texas Tech	L 64–94	1–6	United Spirit Arena (5,857); Lubbock, TX
12/04/2013*; 7:00 pm	Huston–Tillotson	W 90–62	2–6	Convocation Center (752); San Antonio, TX
12/07/2013*; 7:00 pm	at Texas–Pan American	W 72–65	3–6	UTPA Fieldhouse (1,487); Edinburg, TX
12/18/2013*; 7:00 pm	Cal State Bakersfield	L 64–90	3–7	Convocation Center (687); San Antonio, TX
12/22/2013*; 1:00 pm	Georgia State	L 68–99	3–8	Convocation Center (885); San Antonio, TX
12/31/2013*; 2:00 pm	Cameron	W 64–56	4–8	Convocation Center (633); San Antonio, TX
01/04/2014*; 7:00 pm, RSN	at Arkansas	L 71–104	4–9	Bud Walton Arena (13,045); Fayetteville, AR
01/09/2014; 7:00 pm, TWCS	Marshall	W 90–81	5–9 (1–0)	Convocation Center (813); San Antonio, TX
01/11/2014; 7:00 pm, TWCS	Charlotte	W 85–77	6–9 (2–0)	Convocation Center (784); San Antonio, TX
01/16/2014; 7:00 pm	at UAB	L 65–78	6–10 (2–1)	Bartow Arena (4,017); Birmingham, AL
01/18/2014; 7:00 pm	at Middle Tennessee	L 58–80	6–11 (2–2)	Murphy Center (4,405); Murfreesboro, TN
01/25/2014; 3:00 pm, CSS	at UTEP	L 62–81	6–12 (2–3)	Don Haskins Center (8,692); El Paso, TX
01/30/2014; 8:00 pm, TWCS	Rice	W 89–76	7–12 (3–3)	Convocation Center (1,347); San Antonio, TX
02/01/2014; 3:00 pm, TWCS	Louisiana Tech	L 72–87	7–13 (3–4)	Convocation Center (1,104); San Antonio, TX
02/06/2014; 6:00 pm	at Old Dominion	L 61–69	7–14 (3–5)	Ted Constant Convocation Center (5,320); Norfolk, VA
02/08/2014; 4:00 pm	at East Carolina	L 71–81	7–15 (3–6)	Williams Arena (5,188); Greenville, NC
02/13/2014; 7:00 pm	FIU	L 72–80	7–16 (3–7)	Convocation Center (866); San Antonio, TX
02/15/2014; 3:00 pm	Florida Atlantic	W 66–56	8–16 (4–7)	Convocation Center (1,209); San Antonio, TX
02/20/2014; 7:00 pm	at Southern Miss	L 56–85	8–17 (4–8)	Reed Green Coliseum (3,476); Hattiesburg, MS
02/22/2014; 7:00 pm	at Tulane	L 56–68	8–18 (4–9)	Devlin Fieldhouse (1,572); New Orleans, LA
02/27/2014; 7:00 pm	North Texas	L 62–71	8–19 (4–10)	Convocation Center (878); San Antonio, TX
03/02/2014; 3:00 pm	at Tulsa	L 70–72 ^{OT}	8–20 (4–11)	Reynolds Center (5,427); Tulsa, OK
03/06/2014; 7:00 pm	UTEP	L 51–61	8–21 (4–12)	Convocation Center (1,688); San Antonio, TX
2014 Conference USA tournament
03/11/2014; 9:30 pm	vs. East Carolina; First round	L 76–79	8–22	Don Haskins Center (4,226); El Paso, TX
*Non-conference game. ^{#}Rankings from AP Poll. (#) Tournament seedings in parentheses. All times are in Central Time.
