= 2013–14 Southern Miss Golden Eagles basketball team =

American college basketball season

2013–14 Southern Miss Golden Eagles basketball

BVI Tropical Shootout champions Conference USA regular season co-champions

NIT, Quarterfinals
- Conference: Conference USA
- Record: 0–7, 29 wins vacated (0–3 C-USA, 13 wins vacated)
- Head coach: Donnie Tyndall (2nd season)
- Assistant coaches: Jareem Dowling; Adam Howard; Chris Shumate
- Home arena: Reed Green Coliseum

2013–14 Conference USA men's basketball standings
	Conf.				Overall
Team	W		L	PCT	W		L	PCT
Louisiana Tech	13	–	3	.813	29	–	8	.784
Tulsa †	13	–	3	.813	21	–	13	.618
Middle Tennessee	13	–	3	.813	24	–	9	.727
Southern Miss	13	–	3	.813	29	–	7	.806
UTEP	12	–	4	.750	23	–	11	.676
Old Dominion	9	–	7	.563	18	–	18	.500
Tulane	8	–	8	.500	17	–	17	.500
UAB	7	–	9	.438	18	–	13	.581
Charlotte	7	–	9	.438	17	–	14	.548
FIU*	7	–	9	.438	15	–	16	.484
North Texas	6	–	10	.375	16	–	16	.500
Florida Atlantic	5	–	11	.313	10	–	22	.313
East Carolina	5	–	11	.313	17	–	17	.500
UTSA	4	–	12	.250	8	–	22	.267
Marshall	4	–	12	.250	11	–	22	.333
Rice	2	–	14	.125	7	–	23	.233
† 2014 C-USA Tournament winner Rankings from AP poll *Ineligible for postseason play due to APR penalties

The 2013–14 Southern Miss Golden Eagles men's basketball team represented the University of Southern Mississippi during the 2013–14 NCAA Division I men's basketball season. The Golden Eagles, led by second year head coach Donnie Tyndall, played their home games at Reed Green Coliseum and were members of Conference USA. They finished the season 29–7, 13–3 in C-USA play to finish in a four-way tie for the C-USA regular season championship. They advanced to the semifinals of the C-USA tournament where they lost to Louisiana Tech. They were invited to the National Invitation Tournament where they defeated Toledo and Missouri to advance to the quarterfinals where they lost to Minnesota.

In 2016, the NCAA vacated all 29 wins (including 13 conference wins) due to participation of academically ineligible players.

== Roster ==
Number	Name	Position	Height	Weight	Year	Hometown
2	Matt Bingaya	Guard/Forward	6–5	200	Freshman	Delaware, Ohio
3	Davon Hayes	Guard/Forward	6–7	190	Freshman	Portsmouth, Virginia
5	Neil Watson	Guard	5–11	170	Senior	Kansas City, Kansas
11	Daveon Boardingham	Forward	6–7	225	Senior	Newark, New Jersey
12	Deonte Houston	Guard	6–0	180	Junior	The Bronx, New York
13	Chip Armelin	Guard	6–4	198	RS Junior	Sulphur, Louisiana
21	Norville Carey	Forward	6–7	220	Sophomore	British Virgin Islands
22	Aaron Brown	Forward	6–5	210	RS Junior	Hackensack, New Jersey
23	Jerrold Brooks	Guard	6–0	185	Junior	Rochester, New York
24	Michael Craig	Guard/Forward	6–5	230	Senior	Phoenix, Arizona
25	Jamie Chapman	Forward	6–3	175	Sophomore	Mobile, Alabama
30	Jeremiah Eason	Forward	6–7	230	Junior	Fort Launderdale, FL
32	Ude Ifeanyichukwa	Forward	6–10	235	Junior	Abuja, Nigeria

== Schedule ==
Date time, TV	Rank^{#}	Opponent^{#}	Result	Record	Site (attendance) city, state
Exhibition
10/29/2013*; 7:00 pm		Slippery Rock	W 77–65		Reed Green Coliseum (1,420); Hattiesburg, MS
11/03/2013*; 3:00 pm		Truman State	W 89–69		Reed Green Coliseum (1,537); Hattiesburg, MS
Regular season
11/08/2013*; 7:30 pm		Jackson State	W 67–51	1–0	Reed Green Coliseum (4,967); Hattiesburg, MS
11/13/2013*; 8:00 pm, FS2		at DePaul; CBE Hall of Fame Classic	W 75–68	2–0	Allstate Arena (5,840); Rosemont, IL
11/18/2013*; 7:00 pm		at North Dakota State	W 70–69	3–0	Bison Sports Arena (3,724); Fargo, ND
11/22/2013*; 8:00 pm		at South Alabama; CBE Hall of Fame Classic	W 66–59	4–0	Mitchell Center (3,061); Mobile, AL
11/23/2013*; 3:00 pm		vs. Houston Baptist; CBE Hall of Fame Classic	W 67–62	5–0	Mitchell Center (1,614); Mobile, AL
11/24/2013*; 3:00 pm		William Carey; CBE Hall of Fame Classic	W 99–54	6–0	Reed Green Coliseum (3,530); Hattiesburg, MS
11/29/2013*; 6:00 pm		at No. 9 Louisville	L 38–69	6–1	KFC Yum! Center (21,416); Louisville, KY
12/04/2013*; 7:00 pm		Morehead State	W 74–60	7–1	Reed Green Coliseum (3,563); Hattiesburg, MS
12/07/2013*; 3:00 pm		Georgia State	W 75–65 ^{OT}	8–1	Reed Green Coliseum (3,425); Hattiesburg, MS
12/14/2013*; 5:00 pm		St. Catherine	W 96–60	9–1	Reed Green Coliseum (3,149); Hattiesburg, MS
12/18/2013*; 7:00 pm, ESPN3		at Western Kentucky	L 65–68	9–2	E.A. Diddle Arena (3,718); Bowling Green, KY
12/20/2013*; 9:00 pm		vs. Coppin State; BVI Tropical Shootout semifinals	W 88–74	10–2	Multipurpose Sports Complex (435); Tortola, BVI
12/21/2013*; 7:00 pm		vs. Arkansas–Little Rock; BVI Tropical Shootout championship	W 74–60	11–2	Multipurpose Sports Complex (483); Tortola, BVI
12/28/2013*; 1:00 pm		at Rhode Island	W 77–64	12–2	Ryan Center (3,462); Kingston, RI
01/03/2014*; 1:00 pm		Drexel	W 66–49	13–2	Reed Green Coliseum (6,082); Hattiesburg, MS
01/09/2014; 7:00 pm		at North Texas	W 74–64	14–2 (1–0)	The Super Pit (2,337); Denton, TX
01/12/2014; 12:00 pm, FS1		at Tulsa	L 71–75	14–3 (1–1)	Reynolds Coliseum (4,221); Tulsa, OK
01/16/2014; 7:00 pm		Rice	W 84–62	15–3 (2–1)	Reed Green Coliseum (3,835); Hattiesburg, MS
01/19/2014; 12:00 pm, FS1		Louisiana Tech	W 80–71	16–3 (3–1)	Reed Green Coliseum (5,110); Hattiesburg, MS
01/23/2014; 6:00 pm		at Old Dominion	W 75–60	17–3 (4–1)	Ted Constant Convocation Center (7,549); Norfolk, VA
01/25/2014; 4:00 pm		at East Carolina	W 60–46	18–3 (5–1)	Williams Arena (5,214); Greenville, NC
02/01/2014; 6:00 pm		Tulane	W 78–47	19–3 (6–1)	Reed Green Coliseum (5,405); Hattiesburg, MS
02/07/2014; 8:30 pm, CBSSN		Marshall	W 60–57	20–3 (7–1)	Reed Green Coliseum (4,839); Hattiesburg, MS
02/09/2014; 1:00 pm, CBSSN		Charlotte	W 81–64	21–3 (8–1)	Reed Green Coliseum (4,393); Hattiesburg, MS
02/13/2014; 8:00 pm, CSS		at UAB	L 60–84	21–4 (8–2)	Bartow Arena (4,713); Birmingham, AL
02/15/2014; 1:00 pm, CSS		at Middle Tennessee	L 64–81	21–5 (8–3)	Murphy Center (5,102); Murfreesboro, TN
02/20/2014; 7:00 pm		UTSA	W 85–56	22–5 (9–3)	Reed Green Coliseum (3,476); Hattiesburg, MS
02/22/2014; 5:00 pm, CBSSN		UTEP	W 77–68	23–5 (10–3)	Reed Green Coliseum (5,705); Hattiesburg, MS
02/27/2014; 6:00 pm, CSS		FIU	W 78–66	24–5 (11–3)	Reed Green Coliseum (4,587); Hattiesburg, MS
03/02/2014; 8:00 pm		at Florida Atlantic	W 60–49	25–5 (12–3)	U.S. Century Bank Arena (1,425); Miami, FL
03/06/2014; 6:00 pm		at Tulane	W 68–51	26–5 (13–3)	Devlin Fieldhouse (1,906); New Orleans, LA
Conference USA tournament
03/13/2014; 7:00 pm		at UTEP; Quarterfinals	W 64–56	27–5	Don Haskins Center (8,252); El Paso, TX
03/14/2014; 4:30 pm, CBSSN		vs. Louisiana Tech; Semifinals	L 70–88	27–6	Don Haskins Center (5,611); El Paso, TX
NIT
03/19/2014*; 7:30 pm, ESPN3	No. (3)	(6) Toledo; First round	W 66–59	28–6	Reed Green Coliseum (4,054); Hattiesburg, MS
03/23/2014*; 4:00 pm, ESPNU	No. (3)	at (2) Missouri; Second round	W 71–63	29–6	Mizzou Arena (6,033); Columbia, MO
03/25/2014*; 8:00 pm, ESPN	No. (3)	at (1) Minnesota; Quarterfinals	L 73–81	29–7	Williams Arena (5,444); Minneapolis, MN
*Non-conference game. ^{#}Rankings from AP Poll, (#) during NIT is seed within region. (#) Tournament seedings in parentheses. All times are in Central Time.
