= 2013–14 North Texas Mean Green men's basketball team =

American college basketball season

2013–14 North Texas Mean Green men's basketball
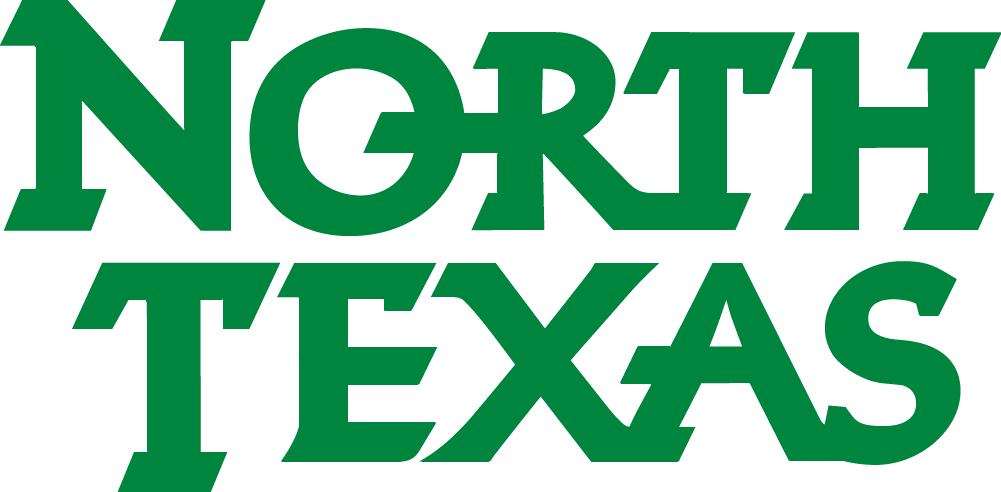
- Conference: Conference USA
- Record: 16–16 (6–10 C-USA)
- Head coach: Tony Benford (2nd season)
- Assistant coaches: David Anwar; Rob Evans; Scott Monarch
- Home arena: The Super Pit (Capacity: 10,040)

2013–14 Conference USA men's basketball standings
	Conf.				Overall
Team	W		L	PCT	W		L	PCT
Louisiana Tech	13	–	3	.813	29	–	8	.784
Tulsa †	13	–	3	.813	21	–	13	.618
Middle Tennessee	13	–	3	.813	24	–	9	.727
Southern Miss	13	–	3	.813	29	–	7	.806
UTEP	12	–	4	.750	23	–	11	.676
Old Dominion	9	–	7	.563	18	–	18	.500
Tulane	8	–	8	.500	17	–	17	.500
UAB	7	–	9	.438	18	–	13	.581
Charlotte	7	–	9	.438	17	–	14	.548
FIU*	7	–	9	.438	15	–	16	.484
North Texas	6	–	10	.375	16	–	16	.500
Florida Atlantic	5	–	11	.313	10	–	22	.313
East Carolina	5	–	11	.313	17	–	17	.500
UTSA	4	–	12	.250	8	–	22	.267
Marshall	4	–	12	.250	11	–	22	.333
Rice	2	–	14	.125	7	–	23	.233
† 2014 C-USA Tournament winner Rankings from AP poll *Ineligible for postseason play due to APR penalties

The 2013–14 North Texas Mean Green men's basketball team represented the University of North Texas during the 2012–13 NCAA Division I men's basketball season. The Mean Green, led by second year head coach Tony Benford, played their home games at UNT Coliseum, nicknamed The Super Pit, and were first year members of Conference USA. They finished the season 16–16, 6–10 in C-USA play to finish 11th place. They advanced to the second round of the C-USA tournament where they lost to Tulane.

== Roster ==
Number	Name	Position	Height	Weight	Year	Hometown
0	Vertrail Vaughns	Guard	6–2	184	RS Senior	Mesquite, Texas
1	Maurice Aniefiok	Guard/Forward	6–5	205	Sophomore	Lagos, Nigeria
2	Brandan Walton	Guard	6–2	195	RS Senior	Compton, California
3	Alzee Williams	Guard	6–4	175	RS Senior	Dallas, Texas
4	Armani Flannigan	Forward	6–8	200	Junior	Rockford, Illinois
5	Chris Jones	Guard	6–2	200	Junior	Garland, Texas
10	Austin Mitchell	Guard	6–1	180	Sophomore	Plano, Texas
21	T.J. Taylor	Guard	6–3	215	RS Junior	Denison, Texas
22	Greg Wesley	Forward	6–7	215	Freshman	Arlington, Texas
23	Jordan Williams	Guard	6–6	195	Junior	Dallas, Texas
24	Kelvin Gaines	Forward/Center	6–10	227	RS Junior	Ocala, Florida
33	Colin Voss	Forward	6–7	240	RS Junior	Grand Rapids, Michigan
44	Keith Coleman	Forward	6–10	250	Junior	Philadelphia, Pennsylvania

== Schedule ==
Date time, TV	Opponent	Result	Record	Site (attendance) city, state
Exhibition
11/01/2013*; 7:00 pm	Oklahoma City	W 78–70		The Super Pit (2,135); Denton, TX
11/04/2013*; 7:00 pm	Southeastern Oklahoma State	W 97–65		The Super Pit (1,665); Denton, TX
Regular season
11/08/2013*; 5:00 pm	Northwood	W 72–67	1–0	The Super Pit (2,236); Denton, OK
11/11/2013*; 7:00 pm, SSTV	at Oklahoma; Coaches vs. Cancer Classic	L 82–95	1–1	Lloyd Noble Center (9,288); Norman, OK
11/14/2013*; 7:00 pm	Nicholls State	W 92–78	2–1	The Super Pit (2,146); Denton, TX
11/21/2013*; 4:00 pm	vs. Columbia; Coaches vs. Cancer Classic	L 66–70	2–2	Chiles Center (N/A); Portland, OR
11/21/2013*; 9:00 pm	vs. Idaho; Coaches vs. Cancer Classic	L 76–87	2–3	Chiles Center (1,444); Portland, OR
11/21/2013*; 9:00 pm	at Portland; Coaches vs. Cancer Classic	W 77–72 ^{OT}	3–3	Chiles Center (1,668); Portland, OR
11/26/2013*; 7:00 pm	Incarnate Word	W 84–67	4–3	The Super Pit (N/A); Denton, TX
11/30/2013*; 7:00 pm	Southeastern Louisiana	W 75–61	5–3	The Super Pit (1,861); Denton, TX
12/03/2013*; 8:00 pm, BYUtv	at BYU	L 67–97	5–4	Marriott Center (13,908); Provo, UT
12/15/2013*; 1:00 pm	Stephen F. Austin	L 53–87	5–5	The Super Pit (1,238); Denton, TX
12/17/2013*; 11:30 am, TWCS	Central Arkansas	W 64–55	6–5	The Super Pit (3,664); Denton, TX
12/21/2013*; 3:00 pm	Wayland Baptist	W 81–77	7–5	The Super Pit (881); Denton, TX
12/31/2013*; 4:30 pm, FSSW	at Texas A&M	W 61–41	8–5	Reed Arena (4,654); College Station, TX
01/04/2014*; 2:00 pm	UC Riverside	W 76–72	9–5	The Super Pit (1,872); Denton, TX
01/09/2014; 7:00 pm	Southern Miss	L 64–74	9–6 (0–1)	The Super Pit (2,337); Denton, TX
01/11/2014; 1:00 pm, CSS	Tulane	L 62–73	9–7 (0–2)	The Super Pit (1,969); Denton, TX
01/16/2014; 6:00 pm, TWCS	at Marshall	W 80–65	10–7 (1–2)	Cam Henderson Center (4,586); Huntington, WV
01/18/2014; 6:00 pm, TWCS	at Charlotte	L 74–76	10–8 (1–3)	Halton Arena (5,780); Charlotte, NC
01/23/2014; 7:00 pm	UAB	W 76–65	11–8 (2–3)	The Super Pit (3,659); Denton, TX
01/25/2014; 7:00 pm	Middle Tennessee	L 63–70	11–9 (2–4)	The Super Pit (4,429); Denton, TX
02/01/2014; 3:00 pm	at Tulsa	L 63–94	11–10 (2–5)	Reynolds Center (4,425); Tulsa, OK
02/06/2014; 7:00 pm	at Rice	L 70–75	11–11 (2–6)	Tudor Fieldhouse (1,112); Houston, TX
02/08/2014; 6:00 pm	at Louisiana Tech	L 75–90	11–12 (2–7)	Thomas Assembly Center (5,123); Ruston, LA
02/13/2014; 7:00 pm	Old Dominion	L 62–72	11–13 (2–8)	The Super Pit (2,335); Denton, TX
02/15/2014; 7:00 pm	East Carolina	W 53–51	12–13 (3–8)	The Super Pit (5,352); Denton, TX
02/20/2014; 6:00 pm	at Florida International	W 65–63	13–13 (4–8)	U.S. Century Bank Arena (924); Miami, FL
02/22/2014; 6:00 pm	at Florida Atlantic	W 78–76	14–13 (5–8)	FAU Arena (N/A); Boca Raton, FL
02/27/2014; 6:00 pm	at UTSA	W 71–62	15–13 (6–8)	Convocation Center (878); San Antonio, TX
03/02/2014; 2:00 pm, TWCS	UTEP	L 54–74	15–14 (6–9)	The Super Pit (N/A); Denton, TX
03/06/2014; 7:00 pm	Tulsa	L 68–79	15–15 (6–10)	The Super Pit (1,841); Denton, TX
2014 Conference USA tournament
03/11/2014; 4:30 pm	vs. Rice; First round	W 63–62 ^{OT}	16–15	Don Haskins Center (4,226); El Paso, TX
03/12/2014; 1:00 pm	vs. Tulane; Second round	L 61–66	16–16	Don Haskins Center (3,916); El Paso, TX
*Non-conference game. (#) Tournament seedings in parentheses. All times are in Central Time.

== See also ==
- 2013–14 North Texas Mean Green women's basketball team
