= 2013–14 Charlotte 49ers men's basketball team =

American college basketball season

2013–14 Charlotte 49ers men's basketball
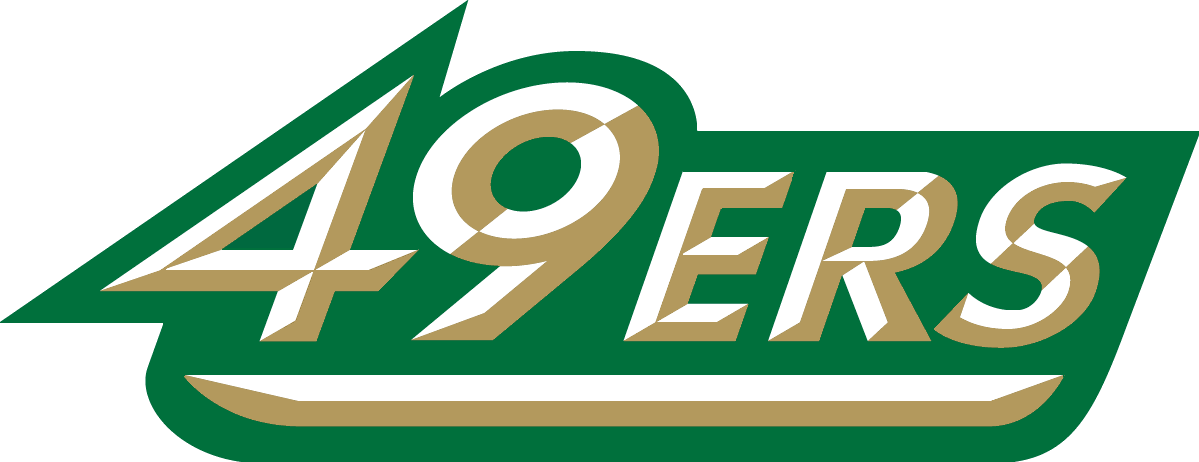

Puerto Rico Tip-Off Champions
- Conference: Conference USA
- Record: 17–14 (7–9 C-USA)
- Head coach: Alan Major (4th season)
- Assistant coaches: Ryan Odom; Desmond Oliver; Orlando Vandross
- Home arena: Dale F. Halton Arena

2013–14 Conference USA men's basketball standings
	Conf.				Overall
Team	W		L	PCT	W		L	PCT
Louisiana Tech	13	–	3	.813	29	–	8	.784
Tulsa †	13	–	3	.813	21	–	13	.618
Middle Tennessee	13	–	3	.813	24	–	9	.727
Southern Miss	13	–	3	.813	29	–	7	.806
UTEP	12	–	4	.750	23	–	11	.676
Old Dominion	9	–	7	.563	18	–	18	.500
Tulane	8	–	8	.500	17	–	17	.500
UAB	7	–	9	.438	18	–	13	.581
Charlotte	7	–	9	.438	17	–	14	.548
FIU*	7	–	9	.438	15	–	16	.484
North Texas	6	–	10	.375	16	–	16	.500
Florida Atlantic	5	–	11	.313	10	–	22	.313
East Carolina	5	–	11	.313	17	–	17	.500
UTSA	4	–	12	.250	8	–	22	.267
Marshall	4	–	12	.250	11	–	22	.333
Rice	2	–	14	.125	7	–	23	.233
† 2014 C-USA Tournament winner Rankings from AP poll *Ineligible for postseason play due to APR penalties

The 2013–14 Charlotte 49ers men's basketball team represented the University of North Carolina at Charlotte during the 2013–14 NCAA Division I men's basketball season. The 49ers, led by fourth head coach Alan Major, played their home games at the Dale F. Halton Arena and were new members Conference USA. They finished the season 17–14, 7–9 in C-USA play to finish in a tie for eighth place. They advanced to the quarterfinals of the C-USA tournament where they lost to Louisiana Tech.

== Roster ==
2013–14 Charlotte 49ers men's basketball team
Players
Coaches

Pos.	#	Name	Height	Weight	Year	Hometown
G	1	Braxton Ogbueze	6 ft 0 in (1.83 m)	179 lb (81 kg)	So	Charlotte, NC
G	2	Gavin Wilson	6 ft 1 in (1.85 m)	208 lb (94 kg)	So	Raleigh, NC
G	3	Shawn Lester	6 ft 4 in (1.93 m)	189 lb (86 kg)	So	Mooresville, NC
G	10	Denzel Ingram	6 ft 0 in (1.83 m)	171 lb (78 kg)	So	Chapel Hill, NC
G	11	Ivan Benkovic	6 ft 6 in (1.98 m)	213 lb (97 kg)	So	Zagreb, CRO
C	12	Mike Thorne Jr.	6 ft 11 in (2.11 m)	257 lb (117 kg)	RS So	Fayetteville, NC
G	14	Terrence Williams	6 ft 4 in (1.93 m)	203 lb (92 kg)	Jr	Charlotte, NC
G	15	Pierriá Henry	6 ft 4 in (1.93 m)	189 lb (86 kg)	Jr	Charleston, WV
F	20	Cameron Blakely	6 ft 9 in (2.06 m)	216 lb (98 kg)	Fr	Winder, GA
F	21	Willie Clayton	6 ft 7 in (2.01 m)	237 lb (108 kg)	So	Thomasville, GA
F	22	Bernard Sullivan	6 ft 8 in (2.03 m)	224 lb (102 kg)	Jr	Gastonia, NC
G	24	Ben Cherry	6 ft 3 in (1.91 m)	180 lb (82 kg)	Sr	Charlotte, NC
F	25	Reid Aube	6 ft 6 in (1.98 m)	212 lb (96 kg)	Fr	Concord, NC
F	25	Marcus Bryan	6 ft 7 in (2.01 m)	224 lb (102 kg)	Fr	Raleigh, NC
G	31	Mitch Warner	6 ft 1 in (1.85 m)	193 lb (88 kg)	So	Charlotte, NC

Head coach

- Alan Major (Purdue)

Assistant coach(es)

- Ryan Odom (Hampden–Sydney)
- Desmond Oliver (Dominican (NY))
- Orlando Vandross (American International)

Legend

- (C) Team captain
- (S) Suspended
- (I) Ineligible
- (W) Walk-on
- Injured
- Current redshirt

Roster
Last update: September 30, 2013

== Schedule ==
Date time, TV	Opponent	Result	Record	Site (attendance) city, state
Exhibition
11/02/2013*; 4:30 pm	Wingate	W 81–57	–	Halton Arena (3,723); Charlotte, NC
Non-conference
11/08/2013*; 7:30 pm	East Tennessee State	W 80–75	1–0	Halton Arena (4,796); Charlotte, NC
11/12/2013*; 7:00 pm	at College of Charleston	L 82–83	1–1	TD Arena (3,752); Charleston, SC
11/15/2013*; 4:00 pm	Elon	W 83–69	2–1	Halton Arena (4,030); Charlotte, NC
11/21/2013*; 10:30 am, ESPNU	vs. Kansas State; Puerto Rico Tip-Off First Round	W 68–61	3–1	Roberto Clemente Coliseum (273); San Juan, PR
11/22/2013*; 2:30 pm, ESPNU	vs. Northeastern; Puerto Rico Tip-Off semifinals	W 86–77	4–1	Roberto Clemente Coliseum (N/A); San Juan, PR
11/24/2013*; 7:30 pm, ESPN2	vs. No. 14 Michigan; Puerto Rico Tip-Off championship	W 63–61	5–1	Roberto Clemente Coliseum (7,642); San Juan, PR
12/01/2013*; 6:00 pm	UNC Asheville	W 77–56	6–1	Halton Arena (4,017); Charlotte, NC
12/04/2013*; 7:00 pm, WCCB	Davidson	L 78–87 ^{OT}	6–2	Halton Arena (6,595); Charlotte, NC
12/08/2013*; 2:00 pm, WCCB	at Appalachian State	W 77–59	7–2	Holmes Center (1,354); Boone, NC
12/17/2013*; 7:00 pm, RSN	at Florida State	L 62–106	7–3	Donald L. Tucker Center (5,522); Tallahassee, FL
12/21/2013*; 7:00 pm	USC Upstate	W 81–76	8–3	Halton Arena (4,042); Charlotte, NC
12/29/2013*; 7:00 pm, FS1	Georgia Tech	L 55–58	8–4	Halton Arena (6,150); Charlotte, NC
01/04/2014*; 7:00 pm, WCCB	North Carolina A&T	W 88–72	9–4	Halton Arena (5,516); Charlotte, NC
C-USA regular season
01/09/2014; 9:00 pm, CBSSN	at UTEP	W 73–68	10–4 (1–0)	Don Haskins Center (7,625); El Paso, TX
01/11/2014; 4:00 pm, TWCSC	at UTSA	L 77–85	10–5 (1–1)	Convocation Center (784); San Antonio, TX
01/16/2014; 7:00 pm	Tulsa	W 90–86 ^{OT}	11–5 (2–1)	Halton Arena (5,043); Charlotte, NC
01/18/2014; 7:00 pm, TWCSC	North Texas	W 76–74	12–5 (3–1)	Halton Arena (5,780); Charlotte, NC
01/23/2014; 7:30 pm	at Louisiana Tech	L 60–80	12–6 (3–2)	Thomas Assembly Center (3,250); Ruston, LA
01/25/2014; 8:00 pm	at Rice	L 69–71	12–7 (3–3)	Tudor Fieldhouse (1,571); Houston, TX
01/30/2014; 7:30 pm	Florida Atlantic	W 62–53	13–7 (4–3)	Halton Arena (4,619); Charlotte, NC
02/01/2014; 7:00 pm, WCCB	FIU	W 73–61	14–7 (5–3)	Halton Arena (5,399); Charlotte, NC
02/07/2014; 8:00 pm	at Tulane	L 63–64	14–8 (5–4)	Devlin Fieldhouse (1,543); New Orleans, LA
02/09/2014; 2:00 pm, CBSSN	at Southern Miss	L 64–81	14–9 (5–5)	Reed Green Coliseum (4,393); Hattiesburg, MS
02/15/2014; 7:00 pm	Marshall	L 56–59	14–10 (5–6)	Halton Arena (5,525); Charlotte, NC
02/20/2014; 7:00 pm	Middle Tennessee	L 49–71	14–11 (5–7)	Halton Arena (4,108); Charlotte, NC
02/22/2014; 3:30 pm, FS1	UAB	L 62–64	14–12 (5–8)	Halton Arena (6,200); Charlotte, NC
02/27/2014; 7:00 pm, FS1	at East Carolina	L 68–75	14–13 (5–9)	Williams Arena (5,248); Greenville, NC
03/02/2014; 7:00 pm, WCCB	Old Dominion	W 74–63	15–13 (6–9)	Halton Arena (4,846); Charlotte, NC
03/06/2014; 7:00 pm, CBSSN	at Marshall	W 74–70	16–13 (7–9)	Cam Henderson Center (4,944); Huntington, WV
Conference USA tournament
03/12/2014; 10:30 pm	vs. UAB; Second round	W 80–70	17–13	Don Haskins Center (8,277); El Paso, TX
03/13/2014; 10:30 pm	vs. Louisiana Tech; Quarterfinals	L 65–86	17–14	Don Haskins Center (8,252); El Paso, TX
*Non-conference game. ^{#}Rankings from AP Poll/Coaches' Poll. (#) Tournament seedings in parentheses. All times are in Eastern Time.
