= 2014 Conference USA men's basketball tournament =

- Classification: Division I
- Season: 2013–14
- Teams: 15
- Site: Don Haskins Center; El Paso, Texas
- Champions: Tulsa (1st title)
- Winning coach: Danny Manning (1st title)
- Television: CBS, CBS Sports Network

2013–14 Conference USA men's basketball standings
	Conf.				Overall
Team	W		L	PCT	W		L	PCT
Louisiana Tech	13	–	3	.813	29	–	8	.784
Tulsa †	13	–	3	.813	21	–	13	.618
Middle Tennessee	13	–	3	.813	24	–	9	.727
Southern Miss	13	–	3	.813	29	–	7	.806
UTEP	12	–	4	.750	23	–	11	.676
Old Dominion	9	–	7	.563	18	–	18	.500
Tulane	8	–	8	.500	17	–	17	.500
UAB	7	–	9	.438	18	–	13	.581
Charlotte	7	–	9	.438	17	–	14	.548
FIU*	7	–	9	.438	15	–	16	.484
North Texas	6	–	10	.375	16	–	16	.500
Florida Atlantic	5	–	11	.313	10	–	22	.313
East Carolina	5	–	11	.313	17	–	17	.500
UTSA	4	–	12	.250	8	–	22	.267
Marshall	4	–	12	.250	11	–	22	.333
Rice	2	–	14	.125	7	–	23	.233
† 2014 C-USA Tournament winner Rankings from AP poll *Ineligible for postseason play due to APR penalties

The 2014 Conference USA men's basketball tournament was the post-season men's basketball tournament for Conference USA, held March 11–15, 2014, in El Paso, Texas, at Don Haskins Center.

== Seeds ==
Seed	School	Conference	Overall	Tiebreaker
1	Louisiana Tech†	13–3	25–6	2–1 vs Tul/MT/SM; 1–0 vs Tul
2	Tulsa†	13–3	18–12	2–1 vs LT/MT/SM; 0–1 vs LT
3	Middle Tennessee†	13–3	23–8	1–2 vs LT/Tul/SM; 1–0 vs. SM
4	Southern Miss†	13–3	26–5	1–2 vs LT/Tul/MT; 0–1 vs. MT
5	UTEP#	12–4	22–9	
6	Old Dominion#	9–7	15–16	
7	Tulane#	8–8	16–15	
8	UAB#	7–9	18–12	1–0 vs Charlotte
9	Charlotte#	7–9	16–13	0–1 vs UAB
10	North Texas	6–10	15–15	
11	Florida Atlantic	5–11	10–21	1–0 vs East Carolina
12	East Carolina	5–11	16–15	0–1 vs Florida Atlantic
13	UTSA	4–12	8–21	1–0 vs Marshall
14	Marshall	4–12	10–21	0–1 vs UTSA
15	Rice	2–14	7–22	
‡ – C–USA regular season champions, and tournament No. 1 seed. † – Received a double–bye in the conference tournament. # – Received a single–bye in the conference tournament. * Ineligible for postseason play due to APR penalties. Overall records include all games played in the C–USA Tournament.

== Schedule ==
Game	Time*	Matchup^{#}	Television	Attendance
First round – Tuesday, March 11
1	3:30 pm	#10 North Texas vs #15 Rice	C-USA DN	
2	6:00 pm	#11 Florida Atlantic vs #14 Marshall	C-USA DN	
3	8:30 pm	#12 East Carolina vs #13 UTSA	C-USA DN	
Second round – Wednesday, March 12
4	12:00 pm	#7 Tulane vs #10 North Texas	C-USA DN	
5	2:30 pm	#6 Old Dominion vs #14 Marshall	C-USA DN	
6	6:00 pm	#5 UTEP vs #12 East Carolina	C-USA DN	
7	8:30 pm	#8 UAB vs #9 Charlotte	C-USA DN	
Quarterfinals – Thursday, March 13
8	12:00 pm	#2 Tulsa vs #7 Tulane	C-USA DN	
9	2:30 pm	#3 Middle Tennessee vs #6 Old Dominion	C-USA DN	
10	6:00 pm	#4 Southern Miss vs #5 UTEP	C-USA DN	
11	8:30 pm	#1 Louisiana Tech vs #9 Charlotte	C-USA DN	
Semifinals – Friday, March 14
12	2:00 pm	#2 Tulsa vs #3 Middle Tennessee	CBSSN	
13	4:30 pm	#4 Southern Miss vs #1 Louisiana Tech	CBSSN	
Championship – Saturday, March 15
14	9:35 am	#2 Tulsa vs. #1 Louisiana Tech	CBS	
*Game times in MT. #-Rankings denote tournament seed

== Bracket ==
First round Tuesday, March 11
12	East Carolina	79
13	UTSA	76
10	North Texas	63
15	Rice	62
11	Florida Atlantic	59
14	Marshall	63

Second round Wednesday, March 12
8	UAB	70
9	Charlotte	80
5	UTEP	77
12	East Carolina	68
7	Tulane	66
10	North Texas	61
6	Old Dominion	78
14	Marshall	58

Quarterfinals; Thursday, March 13
1	Louisiana Tech	86
9	Charlotte	65
4	Southern Miss	64
5	UTEP	56
2	Tulsa	70
7	Tulane	49
3	Middle Tennessee	62
6	Old Dominion	48

Semifinals; Friday, March 14
1	Louisiana Tech	88
4	Southern Miss	70
2	Tulsa	76
3	Middle Tennessee	69

Championship; Saturday, March 15
1	Louisiana Tech	60
2	Tulsa	69
