= 2013–14 Rice Owls men's basketball team =

American college basketball season

2013–14 Rice Owls men's basketball
- Conference: Conference USA
- Record: 7–23 (2–14 C-USA)
- Head coach: Ben Braun (6th season)
- Assistant coaches: Louis Reynaud; Brian Eskildsen; Adam Gierlach
- Home arena: Tudor Fieldhouse

2013–14 Conference USA men's basketball standings
	Conf.				Overall
Team	W		L	PCT	W		L	PCT
Louisiana Tech	13	–	3	.813	29	–	8	.784
Tulsa †	13	–	3	.813	21	–	13	.618
Middle Tennessee	13	–	3	.813	24	–	9	.727
Southern Miss	13	–	3	.813	29	–	7	.806
UTEP	12	–	4	.750	23	–	11	.676
Old Dominion	9	–	7	.563	18	–	18	.500
Tulane	8	–	8	.500	17	–	17	.500
UAB	7	–	9	.438	18	–	13	.581
Charlotte	7	–	9	.438	17	–	14	.548
FIU*	7	–	9	.438	15	–	16	.484
North Texas	6	–	10	.375	16	–	16	.500
Florida Atlantic	5	–	11	.313	10	–	22	.313
East Carolina	5	–	11	.313	17	–	17	.500
UTSA	4	–	12	.250	8	–	22	.267
Marshall	4	–	12	.250	11	–	22	.333
Rice	2	–	14	.125	7	–	23	.233
† 2014 C-USA Tournament winner Rankings from AP poll *Ineligible for postseason play due to APR penalties

The 2013–14 Rice Owls men's basketball team represented Rice University during the 2013–14 NCAA Division I men's basketball season. The Owls, led by sixth year head coach Ben Braun, played their home games at the Tudor Fieldhouse and were members of Conference USA. They finished the season 7–23, 2–14 in C-USA play to finish in last place. They lost in the first round of the C-USA tournament to North Texas.

At the end of the season, head coach Ben Braun resigned after accumulating a six-year record of 63–128. He was replaced by Mike Rhoades, former assistant at VCU.

== Roster ==
Number	Name	Position	Height	Weight	Year	Hometown
0	Dan Peera	Guard	6–0	185	Junior	San Ramon, California
1	Max Guercy	Guard	5–9	165	Sophomore	Arleta, California
2	Joey Burbach	Guard	6–5	190	Freshman	Port Washington, Wisconsin
3	Sean Obi	Forward	6–9	265	Freshman	Kaduna, Nigeria
4	Nizar Kapic	Guard/Forward	6–6	195	RS Freshman	Sankt Pölten, Austria
5	Keith Washington	Guard	6–1	180	Sophomore	Philadelphia, Pennsylvania
10	Denzel Davis	Forward	6–8	215	Freshman	Orlando, Florida
11	Ross Wilson	Forward	6–7	215	Sophomore	Gosforth, England
15	Hunter Eggers	Guard	6–0	200	Freshman	Greenwich, Connecticut
21	Drew Bender	Guard	6–5	195	Freshman	Phoenix, Arizona
22	Marcus Jackson	Guard	6–3	165	Freshman	Acton, California
41	Seth Gearhart	Forward	6–7	215	Junior	Wilsonville, Oregon
42	Austin Ramljak	Guard	6–3	200	Senior	Thousand Oaks, California
44	Bahrom Firozgary	Forward	6–8	200	Senior	Houston, Texas
54	Andrew Drone	Center	6–10	290	Freshman	Junction, Illinois

== Schedule ==
Date time, TV	Opponent	Result	Record	Site (attendance) city, state
Regular season
11/09/2013*; 2:00 pm	St. Thomas	W 69–60	1–0	Tudor Fieldhouse (1,775); Houston, TX
11/12/2013*; 7:00 pm	Southeastern Louisiana	L 62–63	1–1	Tudor Fieldhouse (1,024); Houston, TX
11/15/2013*; 8:00 pm, FSN	at Texas A&M	L 65–68	1–2	Reed Arena (4,816); College Station, TX
11/20/2013*; 7:00 pm	at Texas A&M–Corpus Christi	W 63–61	2–2	American Bank Center (1,006); Corpus Christi, TX
11/23/2013*; 2:00 pm	Princeton	L 56–70	2–3	Tudor Fieldhouse (1,628); Houston, TX
11/29/2013*; 8:00 pm	vs. Rider; Cable Car Classic semifinals	L 92–96 ^{OT}	2–4	Leavey Center (850); Santa Clara, CA
11/30/2013*; 8:00 pm	at Santa Clara; Cable Car Classic 3rd place game	W 67–66	3–4	Leavey Center (1.024); Santa Clara, CA
12/04/2013*; 7:30 pm	at Houston Baptist	L 71–73	3–5	Sharp Gymnasium (724); Houston, TX
12/07/2013*; 2:00 pm	South Alabama	W 96–93 ^{3OT}	4–5	Tudor Fieldhouse (1,201); Houston, TX
12/19/2013*; 11:30 am	Northwood	W 69–56	5–5	Tudor Fieldhouse (4,924); Houston, TX
12/21/2013*; 3:30 pm, CSS/CSNH	vs. Houston; Lone Star Showcase	L 52–54	5–6	Toyota Center (5,907); Houston, TX
12/30/2013*; 1:00 pm, LHN	at Texas	L 44–66	5–7	Frank Erwin Center (8,199); Austin, TX
01/04/2014*; 7:00 pm, CBSSN	Harvard	L 54–69	5–8	Tudor Fieldhouse (1,762); Houston, TX
01/09/2014; 7:00 pm	FIU	L 60–71	5–9 (0–1)	Tudor Fieldhouse (965); Houston, TX
01/11/2014; 7:00 pm	Florida Atlantic	L 68–73	5–10 (0–2)	Tudor Fieldhouse (1,276); Houston, TX
01/16/2014; 7:00 pm	at Southern Miss	L 62–84	5–11 (0–3)	Reed Green Coliseum (3,835); Hattiesburg, MS
01/18/2014; 7:00 pm	at Tulane	L 41–58	5–12 (0–4)	Devlin Fieldhouse (1,531); New Orleans, LA
01/23/2014; 7:00 pm	Marshall	L 63–73	5–13 (0–5)	Tudor Fieldhouse (1,254); Houston, TX
01/25/2014; 7:00 pm	Charlotte	W 71–69	6–13 (1–5)	Tudor Fieldhouse (1,571); Houston, TX
01/30/2014; 8:00 pm, CSS/CSNH	at UTSA	L 76–89	6–14 (1–6)	Convocation Center (1,347); San Antonio, TX
02/01/2014; 8:00 pm	at UTEP	L 57–68	6–15 (1–7)	Don Haskins Center (11,036); El Paso, TX
02/06/2014; 7:00 pm	North Texas	W 75–70	7–15 (2–7)	Tudor Fieldhouse (1,112); Houston, TX
02/08/2014; 3:00 pm, CSS/CSNH	Tulsa	L 56–66	7–16 (2–8)	Tudor Fieldhouse (1,757); Houston, TX
02/15/2014; 7:00 pm	at Louisiana Tech	L 46–85	7–17 (2–9)	Thomas Assembly Center (4,561); Ruston, LA
02/20/2014; 6:00 pm	at Old Dominion	L 51–55	7–18 (2–10)	Constant Center (5,409); Norfolk, VA
02/22/2014; 4:00 pm	at East Carolina	L 55–67	7–19 (2–11)	Williams Arena (5,023); Greenville, NC
02/27/2014; 7:00 pm	UAB	L 60–61	7–20 (2–12)	Tudor Fieldhouse (1,112); Houston, TX
03/01/2014; 5:00 pm	at Middle Tennessee	L 41–65	7–21 (2–13)	Murphy Center (6,307); Murfreesboro, TN
03/06/2014; 7:00 pm	Louisiana Tech	L 48–70	7–22 (2–14)	Tudor Fieldhouse (1,380); Houston, TX
2014 Conference USA tournament
03/11/2014; 4:30 pm	vs. North Texas; First round	L 62–63 ^{OT}	7–23	Don Haskins Center (4,226); El Paso, TX
*Non-conference game. ^{#}Rankings from AP Poll. (#) Tournament seedings in parentheses. All times are in Central Time.
