= 2013–14 Conference USA men's basketball season =

- League: NCAA Division I
- Sport: Basketball
- Teams: 16
- TV partner(s): CBS, CBS Sports Network, Fox Sports

2013–14 NCAA Division I men's basketball season
- Regular season champions: Louisiana Tech; Tulsa; Middle Tennessee; Southern Miss
- Runners-up: UTEP
- Season MVP: Shawn Jones

Tournament
- Champions: Tulsa
- Runners-up: Louisiana Tech
- Finals MVP: James Woodard

Basketball seasons
- 2012–13 2014–15

2013–14 Conference USA men's basketball standings
	Conf.				Overall
Team	W		L	PCT	W		L	PCT
Louisiana Tech	13	–	3	.813	29	–	8	.784
Tulsa †	13	–	3	.813	21	–	13	.618
Middle Tennessee	13	–	3	.813	24	–	9	.727
Southern Miss	13	–	3	.813	29	–	7	.806
UTEP	12	–	4	.750	23	–	11	.676
Old Dominion	9	–	7	.563	18	–	18	.500
Tulane	8	–	8	.500	17	–	17	.500
UAB	7	–	9	.438	18	–	13	.581
Charlotte	7	–	9	.438	17	–	14	.548
FIU*	7	–	9	.438	15	–	16	.484
North Texas	6	–	10	.375	16	–	16	.500
Florida Atlantic	5	–	11	.313	10	–	22	.313
East Carolina	5	–	11	.313	17	–	17	.500
UTSA	4	–	12	.250	8	–	22	.267
Marshall	4	–	12	.250	11	–	22	.333
Rice	2	–	14	.125	7	–	23	.233
† 2014 C-USA Tournament winner Rankings from AP poll *Ineligible for postseason play due to APR penalties

The 2013–14 Conference USA men's basketball season began with practices in October 2013, followed by the start of the 2013–14 NCAA Division I men's basketball season in November.

== Preseason ==
=== Preseason polls ===
C-USA was the only conference not to publish an official preseason poll. However, other publications did publish preseason projections.

	Athlon	Blue Ribbon	ESPN	Lindy's	NBC Sports	USA Today
1.	Louisiana Tech	Louisiana Tech	Southern Miss	Southern Miss	Southern Miss	Louisiana Tech
2.	Southern Miss	UTEP	UTEP	UAB	UTEP	Southern Miss
3.	UTEP	Southern Miss	Louisiana Tech	UTEP	Louisiana Tech	Middle Tennessee
4.	Charlotte	Charlotte	Tulsa	Louisiana Tech	Tulsa	Charlotte
5.	UAB	Middle Tennessee	UAB	Charlotte	Charlotte	UTEP
6.	Tulsa	Tulsa	Charlotte	Tulsa	UAB	FIU
7.	Marshall	UAB	Middle Tennessee	Marshall	Marshall	UAB
8.	Middle Tennessee	North Texas	Marshall	Middle Tennessee	Middle Tennessee	East Carolina
9.	East Carolina	East Carolina	FIU	FIU	FIU	Tulsa
10.	Florida Atlantic	Marshall	North Texas	East Carolina	East Carolina	Florida Atlantic
11.	North Texas	FIU	East Carolina	North Texas	North Texas	Marshall
12.	Tulane	Florida Atlantic	Florida Atlantic	Tulane	Tulane	UTSA
13.	Old Dominion	UTSA	Tulane	Florida Atlantic	Florida Atlantic	Tulane
14.	Rice	Tulane	Old Dominion	Rice	Old Dominion	North Texas
15.	UTSA	Old Dominion	UTSA	UTSA	UTSA	Rice
16.	FIU	Rice	Rice	Old Dominion	Rice	Old Dominion

Although CBS Sports did not rank all the teams, they selected Louisiana Tech as their projected champion and mentioned Southern Miss and UTEP as contenders.

=== Preseason Players to Watch ===
C-USA did not name a preseason all-conference team, but each of the coaches selected a player to watch from their team.

Preseason Players to Watch
Pierriá Henry, Charlotte
Akeem Richmond, East Carolina
Tymell Murphy, FIU
Dragan Sekelja, Florida Atlantic
Raheem Appleby, Louisiana Tech
Elijah Pittman, Marshall
Shawn Jones, Middle Tennessee
Jordan Williams, North Texas
Keenan Palmore, Old Dominion
Max Guercy, Rice
Neil Watson, Southern Miss
Tre Drye, Tulane
James Woodard, Tulsa
Rod Rucker, UAB
Julian Washburn, UTEP
Jeromie Hill, UTSA

== Preconference schedules ==
=== Early-season tournament victories ===
Name	Dates	Location	No. teams	Champion
Puerto Rico Tip-Off	November 21–22, 24	Roberto Clemente Coliseum (San Juan, PR)	8	Charlotte
Gulf Coast Showcase	November 25–27	Germain Arena (Estero, FL)	8	Louisiana Tech

== Rankings ==
Legend
	Improvement in ranking
	Drop in ranking
	Not ranked previous week
RV	Received votes but were not ranked in Top 25 of poll

		Pre/ Wk 1	Wk 2	Wk 3	Wk 4	Wk 5	Wk 6	Wk 7	Wk 8	Wk 9	Wk 10	Wk 11	Wk 12	Wk 13	Wk 14	Wk 15	Wk 16	Wk 17	Wk 18	Wk 19	Wk 20	Final
Charlotte	AP				RV	RV																
Charlotte	C				RV	RV																
East Carolina	AP																					
East Carolina	C																					
FIU	AP																					
FIU	C																					
Florida Atlantic	AP																					
Florida Atlantic	C																					
Louisiana Tech	AP											RV		RV			RV					
Louisiana Tech	C																RV			RV		
Marshall	AP																					
Marshall	C																					
Middle Tennessee	AP																					
Middle Tennessee	C																	RV				
North Texas	AP																					
North Texas	C																					
Old Dominion	AP																					
Old Dominion	C																					
Rice	AP																					
Rice	C																					
Southern Miss	AP													RV	RV	RV			RV			
Southern Miss	C										RV	RV	RV	RV	RV	RV			RV	RV	RV	
Tulane	AP																					
Tulane	C																					
Tulsa	AP																					
Tulsa	C																				RV	
UAB	AP																					
UAB	C																					
UTEP	AP																					
UTEP	C																					
UTSA	AP																					
UTSA	C																					

== Conference schedules ==
=== Conference matrix ===
This table summarizes the head-to-head results between teams in conference play.

	Charlotte	ECU	FIU	FAU	LaTech	Marshall	MTSU	UNT	ODU	Rice	USM	Tulane	Tulsa	UAB	UTEP	UTSA
vs. Charlotte	–	1–0	0–1	0–1	1–0	1–1	1–0	0–1	0–1	1–0	1–0	1–0	0–1	1–0	0–1	1–0
vs. East Carolina	0–1	–	1–0	1–0	0–1	1–0	1–0	1–0	2–0	0–1	1–0	1–0	1–0	0–1	1–0	0–1
vs. FIU	1–0	0–1	–	0–2	1–0	1–0	1–0	1–0	1–0	0–1	1–0	0–1	1–0	0–1	1–0	0–1
vs. Florida Atlantic	1–0	0–1	2–0	–	1–0	0–1	1–0	1–0	1–0	0–1	1–0	1–0	1–0	0–1	0–1	1–0
vs. Louisiana Tech	0–1	1–0	0–1	0–1	–	0–1	0–1	0–1	0–1	0–2	1–0	0–1	0–1	0–1	1–0	0–1
vs. Marshall	1–1	0–1	0–1	1–0	1–0	–	1–0	1–0	1–0	0–1	1–0	1–0	1–0	1–0	1–0	1–0
vs. Middle Tennessee	0–1	0–1	0–1	0–1	1–0	0–1	–	0–1	0–1	0–1	0–1	0–1	1–0	0–2	1–0	0–1
vs. North Texas	1–0	0–1	0–1	0–1	1–0	0–1	1–0	–	1–0	1–0	1–0	1–0	2–0	0–1	1–0	0–1
vs. Old Dominion	1–0	0–2	0–1	0–1	1–0	0–1	1–0	0–1	–	0–1	1–0	0–1	1–0	1–0	1–0	0–1
vs. Rice	0–1	1–0	1–0	1–0	2–0	1–0	1–0	0–1	1–0	–	1–0	1–0	1–0	1–0	1–0	1–0
vs. Southern Miss	0–1	0–1	0–1	0–1	0–1	0–1	1–0	0–1	0–1	0–1	–	0–2	1–0	1–0	0–1	0–1
vs. Tulane	0–1	0–1	1–0	0–1	1–0	0–1	1–0	0–1	1–0	0–1	2–0	–	1–0	0–1	1–0	0–1
vs. Tulsa	1–0	0–1	0–1	0–1	1–0	0–1	0–1	0–2	0–1	0–1	0–1	0–1	–	1–0	0–1	0–1
vs. UAB	0–1	1–0	1–0	1–0	1–0	0–1	2–0	1–0	0–1	0–1	0–1	1–0	0–1	–	1–0	0–1
vs. UTEP	1–0	0–1	0–1	1–0	0–1	0–1	0–1	0–1	0–1	0–1	1–0	0–1	1–0	0–1	–	0–2
vs. UTSA	0–1	1–0	1–0	0–1	1–0	0–1	1–0	1–0	1–0	0–1	1–0	1–0	1–0	1–0	2–0	–
Total	7–9	5–11	7–9	5–11	13–3	4–12	13–3	6–10	9–7	2–14	13–3	8–8	13–3	7–9	12–4	4–12

== Player of the week ==
Players of the week

Throughout the conference regular season, the C-USA offices named one or two players of the week and one or two freshmen of the week each Monday.

Week	Player of the week	Freshman of the week
November 11, 2013	Rakeem Buckles, FIU	Matt Willms, UTEP
November 11, 2013	Elijah Pittman, Marshall	Matt Willms, UTEP
November 18, 2013	Louis Dabney, Tulane	Jonathan Stark, Tulane
November 18, 2013	C. J. Washington, UAB	Jonathan Stark, Tulane
November 25, 2013	Chad Frazier, UAB	Sean Obi, Rice
December 2, 2013	Chad Frazier (2), UAB	Kareem Canty, Marshall
December 9, 2013	Pablo Bertone, Florida Atlantic	Kareem Canty (2), Marshall
December 16, 2013	Shawn Jones, Middle Tennessee	Kareem Canty (3), Marshall
December 23, 2013	Jonathan Stark, Tulane	Jonathan Stark (2), Tulane
December 30, 2013	John Bohannon, UTEP	Vince Hunter, UTEP
January 6, 2014	Alex Hamilton, Louisiana Tech	Ryan Taylor, Marshall
January 13, 2014	John Bohannon (2), UTEP	Jonathan Stark (3), Tulane
January 20, 2014	Michael Craig, Southern Miss	Vince Hunter (2), UTEP
January 27, 2014	Speedy Smith, Louisiana Tech	Ryan Taylor (2), Marshall
January 27, 2014	Neil Watson, Southern Miss	Ryan Taylor (2), Marshall
February 3, 2014	Shawn Jones (2), Middle Tennessee	Vince Hunter (3), UTEP
February 10, 2014	Akeem Richmond, East Carolina	Marquan Botley, Florida Atlantic
February 17, 2014	Kerry Hammonds, Middle Tennessee	Vince Hunter (4), UTEP
February 24, 2014	Aaron Brown, Southern Miss	Vince Hunter (5), UTEP
March 3, 2014	Daveon Boardingham, Southern Miss	Caleb White, East Carolina
March 7, 2014	Shawn Jones (3), Middle Tennessee	Marquan Botley (2), Florida Atlantic

== Honors and awards ==
=== All-Conference USA Awards and Teams ===
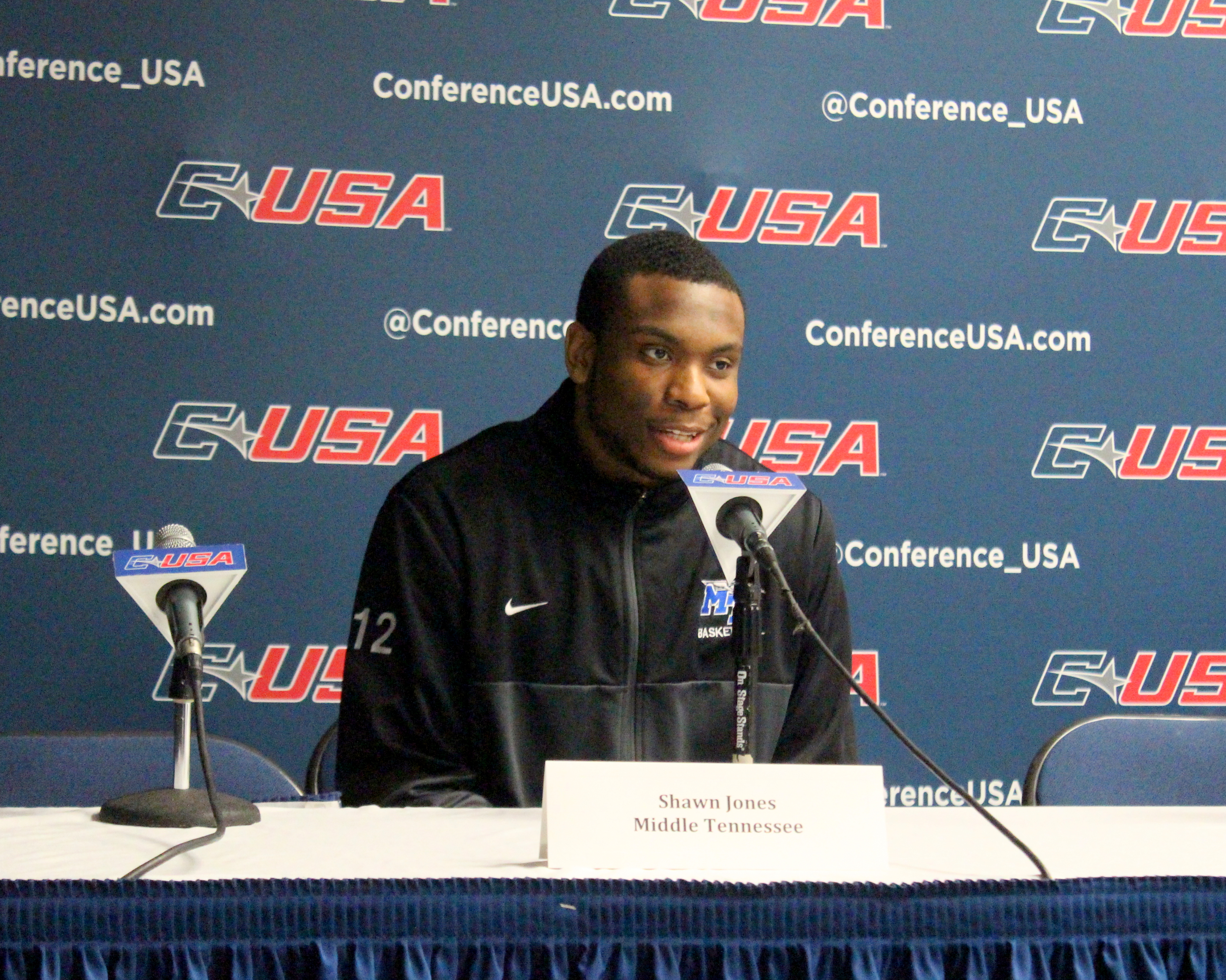
Shawn Jones

Honor	Recipient
Player of the Year	Shawn Jones, Middle Tennessee
Coach of the Year	Danny Manning, Tulsa
Freshman of the Year	Vince Hunter, UTEP
Defensive Player of the Year	Speedy Smith, Louisiana Tech
Newcomer of the Year	Chad Frazier, UAB
Sixth Man of the Year	Kenyon McNeail, Louisiana Tech
All-Conference USA First Team	Pablo Bertone, Florida Atlantic
All-Conference USA First Team	Chad Frazier, UAB
All-Conference USA First Team	Shawn Jones, Middle Tennessee
All-Conference USA First Team	Speedy Smith, Louisiana Tech
All-Conference USA First Team	Neil Watson, Southern Miss
All-Conference USA Second Team	Vince Hunter, UTEP
All-Conference USA Second Team	Tymell Murphy, FIU
All-Conference USA Second Team	Akeem Richmond, East Carolina
All-Conference USA Second Team	Julian Washburn, UTEP
All-Conference USA Second Team	James Woodard, Tulsa
All-Conference USA Third Team	John Bohannon, UTEP
All-Conference USA Third Team	Kareem Canty, Marshall
All-Conference USA Third Team	Michael Craig, Southern Miss
All-Conference USA Third Team	Alex Hamilton, Louisiana Tech
All-Conference USA Third Team	Pierriá Henry, Charlotte
All-Freshman Team	Marquan Botley, Florida Atlantic
All-Freshman Team	Kareem Canty, Marshall
All-Freshman Team	Ryan Taylor, Marshall
All-Freshman Team	Sean Obi, Rice
All-Freshman Team	Jonathan Stark, Tulane
All-Freshman Team	Vince Hunter, UTEP
All-Defensive Team	Pierriá Henry, Charlotte
All-Defensive Team	Michale Kyser, Louisiana Tech
All-Defensive Team	Speedy Smith, Louisiana Tech
All-Defensive Team	Tweety Knight, Middle Tennessee
All-Defensive Team	Julian Washburn, UTEP
All-Academic Team	Ben Cherry, Charlotte
All-Academic Team	Justin Raffington, Florida Atlantic
All-Academic Team	Jackson Trapp, Florida Atlantic
All-Academic Team	Vertrail Vaughns, North Texas
All-Academic Team	Austin Ramljak, Rice

=== NABC ===
The National Association of Basketball Coaches announced their Division I All-District teams on March 12, recognizing the nation's best men's collegiate basketball student-athletes. Selected and voted on by member coaches of the NABC, 252 student-athletes, from 25 districts were chosen. The selections on this list were then eligible for NABC Coaches' All-America Honors. The following list represented the District 11 players chosen to the list.

First Team

- Shawn Jones, Middle Tennessee
- Chad Frazier, UAB
- Pablo Bertone, Florida Atlantic
- Julian Washburn, UTEP
- Kenneth "Speedy" Smith, Louisiana Tech

Second Team

- Neil Watson, Southern Miss
- Alex Hamilton, Louisiana Tech
- Tymell Murphy, FIU
- Vince Hunter, UTEP
- James Woodard, Tulsa

== Postseason ==
=== Conference USA Tournament ===
- March 11–15, 2014 Conference USA Men's Basketball Tournament, Don Haskins Center, El Paso, Texas.

2014 Conference USA men's basketball tournament seeds and results
Seed	School	Conf.	Over.	Tiebreaker	First round March 11	Second round March 12	Quarterfinals March 13	Semifinals March 14	Championship March 15
1	Louisiana Tech †	13–3	27–7	2–1 vs Tul/MT/SM; 1–0 vs Tul	Bye	Bye	Defeated Charlotte 86–65	Defeated Southern Miss 88–70	Eliminated by Tulsa 69–60
2	Tulsa †	13–3	21–12	2–1 vs LT/MT/SM; 0–1 vs LT	Bye	Bye	Defeated Tulane 70–49	Defeated Middle Tennessee 76–69	Defeated Louisiana Tech 69–60
3	Middle Tennessee †	13–3	24–9	1–2 vs LT/Tul/SM; 1–0 vs. SM	Bye	Bye	Defeated Old Dominion 62–48	Eliminated by Tulsa 76–69	
4	Southern Miss †	13–3	27–6	1–2 vs LT/Tul/MT; 0–1 vs. MT	Bye	Bye	Defeated UTEP 64–56	Eliminated by Louisiana Tech 88–70	
5	UTEP #	12–4	23–10		Bye	Defeated East Carolina 77–68	Eliminated by Southern Miss 64–56		
6	Old Dominion #	9–7	16–17		Bye	Defeated Marshall 78–58	Eliminated by Middle Tennessee 62–48		
7	Tulane #	8–8	17–16		Bye	Defeated North Texas 66–61	Eliminated by Tulsa 70–49		
8	UAB #	7–9	18–13	1–0 vs Charlotte	Bye	Eliminated by Charlotte 80–70			
9	Charlotte #	7–9	17–14	0–1 vs UAB	Bye	Defeated UAB 80–70	Eliminated by Louisiana Tech 86–65		
10	North Texas	6–10	16–16		Defeated Rice 63–62	Eliminated by Tulane 66–61			
11	Florida Atlantic	5–11	10–22	1–0 vs East Carolina	Eliminated by Marshall 63–59				
12	East Carolina	5–11	17–16	0–1 vs Florida Atlantic	Defeated UTSA 79–76	Eliminated by UTEP 77–68			
13	UTSA	4–12	8–22	1–0 vs Marshall	Eliminated by East Carolina 79–76				
14	Marshall	4–12	11–22	0–1 vs UTSA	Defeated Florida Atlantic 63–59	Eliminated by Old Dominion 78–58			
15	Rice	2–14	7–23		Eliminated by North Texas 63–62				
† – C-USA regular season co-champions and received a double-bye in the conference tournament. # – Received a single-bye in the conference tournament. Overall records include all games played in the C-USA tournament. FIU is ineligible due to Academic Progress Rate violations.

=== NCAA tournament ===
Seed	Region	School	First Four	Round of 64	Round of 32	Sweet 16	Elite Eight	Final Four	Championship
13	South	Tulsa	n/a	Eliminated by UCLA 76–59					
		W–L (%):	0–0 –	0–1 .000	0–0 –	0–0 –	0–0 –	0–0 –	0–0 –Total: 0–1 .000

=== National Invitation Tournament ===
Seed	Bracket	School	First round	Second round	Quarterfinals	Semifinals	Finals
3	Florida State	Louisiana Tech	Defeated Iona 89–88	Defeated Georgia 79–71	Eliminated by Florida State 78–75		
3	Minnesota	Southern Miss	Defeated Toledo 66–59	Defeated Missouri 71–63	Eliminated by Minnesota 81–73		
		W–L (%):	2–0 1.000	2–0 1.000	0–2 .000	0–0 –	0–0 – Total: 4–2 .667

=== College Basketball Invitational ===
School	First round	Quarterfinals	Semifinals	Finals
Old Dominion	Defeated South Dakota State 72–65	Defeated Radford 82–59	Eliminated by Fresno State 71–64	
Tulane	Eliminated by Princeton 56–55			
UTEP	Eliminated by Fresno State 61–56			
W–L (%):	1–2 .333	1–0 1.000	0–1 .000	0–0 – Total: 2–3 .400

=== CollegeInsider.com Postseason Tournament ===
School	First round	Second round	Quarterfinals	Semifinals	Finals
East Carolina	Eliminated by Wright State 73–59				
W–L (%):	0–1 .000	0–0 –	0–0 –	0–0 –	0–0 – Total: 0–1 .000
