= 2013–14 FIU Panthers men's basketball team =

American college basketball season

2013–14 FIU Panthers men's basketball
- Conference: Conference USA
- Record: 15–16 (7–9 C-USA)
- Head coach: Anthony Evans (1st season)
- Assistant coaches: Louis Rowe; Stephen Ott; Mike Gillian
- Home arena: U.S. Century Bank Arena

2013–14 Conference USA men's basketball standings
	Conf.				Overall
Team	W		L	PCT	W		L	PCT
Louisiana Tech	13	–	3	.813	29	–	8	.784
Tulsa †	13	–	3	.813	21	–	13	.618
Middle Tennessee	13	–	3	.813	24	–	9	.727
Southern Miss	13	–	3	.813	29	–	7	.806
UTEP	12	–	4	.750	23	–	11	.676
Old Dominion	9	–	7	.563	18	–	18	.500
Tulane	8	–	8	.500	17	–	17	.500
UAB	7	–	9	.438	18	–	13	.581
Charlotte	7	–	9	.438	17	–	14	.548
FIU*	7	–	9	.438	15	–	16	.484
North Texas	6	–	10	.375	16	–	16	.500
Florida Atlantic	5	–	11	.313	10	–	22	.313
East Carolina	5	–	11	.313	17	–	17	.500
UTSA	4	–	12	.250	8	–	22	.267
Marshall	4	–	12	.250	11	–	22	.333
Rice	2	–	14	.125	7	–	23	.233
† 2014 C-USA Tournament winner Rankings from AP poll *Ineligible for postseason play due to APR penalties

The 2013–14 FIU Panthers men's basketball team represented Florida International University during the 2013–14 NCAA Division I men's basketball season. The Panthers, led by first year head coach Anthony Evans, played their home games at U.S. Century Bank Arena, and were first members of Conference USA.

Due to APR penalties, they were ineligible for a post-season berth, including the 2014 Conference USA men's basketball tournament.

They finished the season 15–16, 7–9 in C-USA play to finish in a three way tie for eighth place.

== Roster ==
Number	Name	Position	Height	Weight	Year	Hometown
1	Anthony Boswell	Guard	6–6	205	Freshman	Bronx, New York
2	Raymond Taylor	Guard	5–6	145	RS Senior	Miami, Florida
3	Jerome Frink	Forward	6–6	220	Sophomore	Jersey City, New Jersey
4	Cody Mann	Guard	6–0	160	RS Sophomore	Miami, Florida
5	Dee Lewis	Guard	6–3	195	RS Freshman	Ocala, Florida
11	Ray Rodriquez	Guard	6–1	180	Sophomore	Miami, Florida
12	Dominique Williams	Guard	6–7	205	Freshman	Charlotte, North Carolina
14	Jonas Page	Forward	6–7	185	Freshman	Harrisburg, Pennsylvania
15	Tymell Murphy	Forward	6–5	210	Senior	Brooklyn, New York
20	Adrian Diaz	Forward	6–10	230	Junior	Miami, Florida
21	Rakeem Buckles	Forward	6–7	215	RS Senior	Miami, Florida
22	Dennis Mavin	Guard	6–3	183	RS Junior	Gainesville, Florida
23	Marco Porcher Jimenez	Guard	6–4	185	Junior	Málaga, Spain
25	Ivan Jurkovic	Center	7–0	245	Senior	Zagreb, Croatia
32	Adriel Jimenez	Guard	6–2	185	Sophomore	Miami, Florida
33	George Naldjieff	Forward	6–6	225	Senior	Miami, Florida
34	Joey De La Rosa	Center	6–11	240	Junior	Bronx, New York

== Schedule ==
Date time, TV	Opponent	Result	Record	Site (attendance) city, state
Regular season
11/08/2013*; 5:00 pm	vs. Eastern Kentucky; Kennesaw State Tournament	L 61–83	0–1	KSU Convocation Center (400); Kennesaw, GA
11/09/2013*; 3:00 pm	vs. Youngstown State; Kennesaw State Tournament	L 72–74	0–2	KSU Convocation Center (N/A); Kennesaw, GA
11/10/2013*; 3:30 pm, ESPN3	at Kennesaw State; Kennesaw State Tournament	W 66–58	1–2	KSU Convocation Center (1,101); Kennesaw, GA
11/12/2013*; 12:00 pm	vs. Warren Wilson; Kennesaw State Tournament	W 93–56	2–2	KSU Convocation Center (197); Kennesaw, GA
11/14/2013*; 7:00 pm	Florida College	W 85–39	3–2	U.S. Century Bank Arena (2,254); Miami, FL
11/16/2013*; 7:00 pm	Texas Southern	W 70–68	4–2	U.S. Century Bank Arena (1,348); Miami, FL
11/18/2013*; 7:00 pm	Stetson	W 75–66	5–2	U.S. Century Bank Arena (1,524); Miami, FL
11/21/2013*; 7:00 pm	at Bethune-Cookman	W 82–67	6–2	Moore Gymnasium (N/A); Daytona Beach, FL
11/24/2013*; 1:00 pm, SPSO	at South Carolina	L 72–84	6–3	Colonial Life Arena (9,869); Columbia, SC
11/30/2013*; 5:00 pm	Georgia State	W 61–60	7–3	U.S. Century Bank Arena (1,028); Miami, FL
12/03/2013*; 7:00 pm	Nova Southeastern	L 59–77	7–4	U.S. Century Bank Arena (1,081); Miami, FL
12/07/2013*; 4:00 pm, FS1	Florida Gulf Coast	W 72–61	8–4	U.S. Century Bank Arena (2,085); Miami, FL
12/21/2013*; 6:00 pm, FS1	No. 6 Louisville	L 56–85	8–5	U.S. Century Bank Arena (3,361); Miami, FL
12/28/2013*; 12:00 pm, FS1	at Georgetown	L 57–92	8–6	Verizon Center (7,824); Washington, D.C.
01/02/2014*; 7:00 pm	at Florida A&M	L 88–93 ^{OT}	8–7	Teaching Gym (459); Tallahassee, FL
01/09/2014; 8:00 pm	at Rice	W 71–60	9–7 (1–0)	Tudor Fieldhouse (965); Houston, TX
01/11/2014; 8:00 pm	at Louisiana Tech	L 51–85	9–8 (1–1)	Thomas Assembly Center (4,236); Ruston, LA
01/16/2014; 7:00 pm	Old Dominion	L 36–52	9–9 (1–2)	U.S. Century Bank Arena (1,246); Miami, FL
01/18/2014; 5:00 pm	East Carolina	W 68–64	10–9 (2–2)	U.S. Century Bank Arena (1,106); Miami, FL
01/25/2014; 6:00 pm, CSS	Florida Atlantic	W 66–57	11–9 (3–2)	U.S. Century Bank Arena (2,044); Miami, FL
01/30/2014; 7:00 pm	at Marshall	L 68–80	11–10 (3–3)	Cam Henderson Center (4,551); Huntington, WV
02/01/2014; 7:00 pm	at Charlotte	L 61–73	11–11 (3–4)	Halton Arena (5,399); Charlotte, NC
02/06/2014; 7:00 pm	UAB	W 78–73	12–11 (4–4)	U.S. Century Bank Arena (1,002); Miami, FL
02/08/2014; 7:00 pm	Middle Tennessee	L 68–70	12–12 (4–5)	U.S. Century Bank Arena (1,217); Miami, FL
02/13/2014; 8:00 pm	at UTSA	W 80–72	13–12 (5–5)	Convocation Center (866); San Antonio, TX
02/15/2014; 9:05 pm	at UTEP	L 71–84	13–13 (5–6)	Don Haskins Center (11,176); El Paso, TX
02/20/2014; 7:00 pm	North Texas	L 63–65	13–14 (5–7)	U.S. Century Bank Arena (924); Miami, FL
02/22/2014; 2:00 pm	Tulsa	L 65–77	13–15 (5–8)	U.S. Century Bank Arena (862); Miami, FL
02/27/2014; 7:00 pm, CSS	Southern Miss	L 66–78	13–16 (5–9)	Reed Green Coliseum (4,587); Hattiesburg, MS
03/02/2014; 2:00 pm	Tulane	W 73–47	14–16 (6–9)	U.S. Century Bank Arena (1,029); Miami, FL
03/06/2014; 7:00 pm	at Florida Atlantic	W 74–70	15–16 (7–9)	FAU Arena (1,374); Boca Raton, FL
*Non-conference game. ^{#}Rankings from AP Poll. (#) Tournament seedings in parentheses. All times are in Eastern Time.
