= 2013–14 UAB Blazers men's basketball team =

American college basketball season

2013–14 UAB Blazers men's basketball
- Conference: Conference USA
- Record: 18–13 (7–9 C-USA)
- Head coach: Jerod Haase (2nd season)
- Assistant coaches: Robert Ehsan; Richie Riley; Jeff Wulbrun
- Home arena: Bartow Arena

2013–14 Conference USA men's basketball standings
	Conf.				Overall
Team	W		L	PCT	W		L	PCT
Louisiana Tech	13	–	3	.813	29	–	8	.784
Tulsa †	13	–	3	.813	21	–	13	.618
Middle Tennessee	13	–	3	.813	24	–	9	.727
Southern Miss	13	–	3	.813	29	–	7	.806
UTEP	12	–	4	.750	23	–	11	.676
Old Dominion	9	–	7	.563	18	–	18	.500
Tulane	8	–	8	.500	17	–	17	.500
UAB	7	–	9	.438	18	–	13	.581
Charlotte	7	–	9	.438	17	–	14	.548
FIU*	7	–	9	.438	15	–	16	.484
North Texas	6	–	10	.375	16	–	16	.500
Florida Atlantic	5	–	11	.313	10	–	22	.313
East Carolina	5	–	11	.313	17	–	17	.500
UTSA	4	–	12	.250	8	–	22	.267
Marshall	4	–	12	.250	11	–	22	.333
Rice	2	–	14	.125	7	–	23	.233
† 2014 C-USA Tournament winner Rankings from AP poll *Ineligible for postseason play due to APR penalties

The 2013–14 UAB Blazers men's basketball team represented the University of Alabama at Birmingham during the 2013–14 NCAA Division I men's basketball season. The Blazers, led by second year head coach Jerod Haase, played their home games at Bartow Arena. They were members of Conference USA. They finished the season 18–13, 7–9 in C-USA play to finish in a tie for eighth place. They lost in the second round of the C-USA tournament to Charlotte.

== Roster ==
2013–14 UAB Blazers men's basketball team
Players
Coaches

Pos.	#	Name	Height	Weight	Year	Hometown
C	15	Fahro Alihodzic	6 ft 10 in (2.08 m)	240 lb (109 kg)	Sr	Vlasenica, Bosnia(Southeastern (Iowa) CC)
G	2	Robert Brown	6 ft 5 in (1.96 m)	190 lb (86 kg)	Jr	Clermont, Fla.(Virginia Tech)
G	13	Chad Frazier	6 ft 4 in (1.93 m)	190 lb (86 kg)	Jr	Charlotte, N.C.(Gulf Coast (Fla.) CC)
G	22	Tyler Madison	6 ft 4 in (1.93 m)	225 lb (102 kg)	Fr	Columbiana, Ala.
F	21	Tosin Mehinti	6 ft 9 in (2.06 m)	213 lb (97 kg)	Fr	Lithonia, Ga.
F	24	Preston Purifoy	6 ft 5 in (1.96 m)	220 lb (100 kg)	Sr	Conway, Ark.
G	11	Thaddeus Rideau	6 ft 4 in (1.93 m)	168 lb (76 kg)	Jr	Port Arthur, Tex.(Brown Mackie (Kan.) CC)
F	42	Rod Rucker	6 ft 5 in (1.96 m)	220 lb (100 kg)	Sr	Elberton, Ga.
F	44	Jordan Swing	6 ft 6 in (1.98 m)	200 lb (91 kg)	Sr	Birmingham, Ala.(Western Kentucky)
F	25	C.J. Washington	6 ft 8 in (2.03 m)	219 lb (99 kg)	Jr	Augusta, Ga.(Tallahassee (Fla.) CC)
G	1	Denzell Watts	6 ft 2 in (1.88 m)	207 lb (94 kg)	Fr	Flint, Mich.
G	12	K.C. Whitaker	6 ft 6 in (1.98 m)	185 lb (84 kg)	RS So	Ashburn, Va.
G	5	Robert Williams	6 ft 4 in (1.93 m)	210 lb (95 kg)	RS Sr	Greenville, Miss.

Head coach

Jerod Haase

Assistant coach(es)

Robert Ehsan

Richie Riley

Jeff Wulbrun

Legend

- (C) Team captain
- (S) Suspended
- (I) Ineligible
- (W) Walk-on
- Injured
- Current redshirt

Roster
Last update: July 4, 2013

== Schedule ==
Date time, TV	Opponent	Result	Record	Site (attendance) city, state
Exhibition
11/03/2013*; 2:00 pm	Milligan	W 89–68	–	Bartow Arena (2,870); Birmingham, AL
Regular season
11/08/2013*; 7:00 pm	Columbus State	W 76–56	1–0	Bartow Arena (3,127); Birmingham, AL
11/11/2013*; 7:00 pm, CSS	Rutgers	W 79–76	2–0	Bartow Arena (4,073); Birmingham, AL
11/14/2013*; 7:00 pm	Troy	W 81–69	3–0	Bartow Arena (3,412); Birmingham, AL
11/21/2013*; 2:00 pm, ESPNU	vs. No. 19 New Mexico; Charleston Classic Quarterfinals	L 94–97 ^{2OT}	3–1	TD Arena (1,873); Charleston, SC
11/22/2013*; 12:00 pm, ESPN3	vs. Nebraska; Charleston Classic Consolation 2nd Round	W 87–74	4–1	TD Arena (N/A); Charleston, SC
11/24/2013*; 6:30 pm, ESPN3	vs. Temple; Charleston Classic 5th place game	L 66–87	4–2	TD Arena (N/A); Charleston, SC
11/27/2013*; 2:00 pm	Florida A&M	W 85–73	5–2	Bartow Arena (3,319); Birmingham, AL
12/01/2013*; 5:00 pm, FS1	No. 16 North Carolina	W 63–59	6–2	Bartow Arena (8,313); Birmingham, AL
12/07/2013*; 7:00 pm	at Northeastern	W 74–69	7–2	Matthews Arena (1,482); Boston, MA
12/15/2013*; 7:00 pm, CSS	Georgia Southern	W 84–62	8–2	Bartow Arena (3,167); Birmingham, AL
12/18/2013*; 7:00 pm	Chattanooga	W 67–52	9–2	Bartow Arena (3,009); Birmingham, AL
12/21/2013*; 4:00 pm, CST	at LSU	L 63–86	9–3	Maravich Center (8,418); Baton Rouge, LA
12/29/2013*; 2:00 pm	Alabama A&M	W 69–57	10–3	Bartow Arena (3,411); Birmingham, AL
01/04/2014*; 2:00 pm	Newberry	W 96–75	11–3	Bartow Arena (2,891); Birmingham, AL
01/11/2014; 5:00 pm, CSS	at Middle Tennessee	L 84–89 ^{OT}	11–4 (0–1)	Murphy Center (4,605); Murfreesboro, TN
01/16/2014; 7:00 pm	UTSA	W 78–65	12–4 (1–1)	Bartow Arena (4,017); Birmingham, AL
01/18/2014; 7:00 pm	UTEP	L 61–63	12–5 (1–2)	Bartow Arena (6,123); Birmingham, AL
01/23/2014; 7:00 pm	at North Texas	L 65–76	12–6 (1–3)	Super Pit (3,659); Denton, TX
01/25/2014; 3:00 pm	at Tulsa	W 70–63	13–6 (2–3)	Reynolds Coliseum (4,827); Tulsa, OK
01/30/2014; 7:00 pm	Old Dominion	W 75–66	14–6 (3–3)	Bartow Arena (2,491); Birmingham, AL
02/01/2014; 2:00 pm	East Carolina	L 67–74	14–7 (3–4)	Bartow Arena (6,013); Birmingham, AL
02/06/2014; 6:00 pm	at FIU	L 73–78	14–8 (3–5)	U.S. Century Bank Arena (1,002); Miami, FL
02/08/2014; 6:00 pm	at Florida Atlantic	L 71–82	14–9 (3–6)	FIU Arena (1,131); Boca Raton, FL
02/13/2014; 6:00 pm, CSS	Southern Miss	W 84–60	15–9 (4–6)	Bartow Arena (4,713); Birmingham, AL
02/15/2014; 6:00 pm	Tulane	L 80–86	15–10 (4–7)	Bartow Arena (5,276); Birmingham, AL
02/20/2014; 6:00 pm	at Marshall	W 68–62	16–10 (5–7)	Cam Henderson Center (4,784); Huntington, WV
02/22/2014; 2:30 pm, FS1	at Charlotte	W 64–62	17–10 (6–7)	Halton Arena (6,200); Charlotte, NC
02/27/2014; 7:00 pm	at Rice	W 61–60	18–10 (7–7)	Tudor Fieldhouse (1,112); Houston, TX
03/02/2014; 3:00 pm	Louisiana Tech	L 58–67	18–11 (7–8)	Bartow Arena (5,133); Birmingham, AL
03/06/2014; 7:00 pm	at Middle Tennessee	L 53–55	18–12 (7–9)	Bartow Arena (4,673); Birmingham, AL
Conference USA tournament
03/12/2014; 9:30 pm	vs. Charlotte; Second round	L 70–80	18–13	Don Haskins Center (8,277); El Paso, TX
*Non-conference game. ^{#}Rankings from AP Poll. (#) Tournament seedings in parentheses. All times are in Central Time.
