= 2013–14 Middle Tennessee Blue Raiders men's basketball team =

American college basketball season

2013–14 Middle Tennessee Blue Raiders men's basketball

Conference USA Regular Season Co-Champions
- Conference: Conference USA
- Record: 24–9 (13–3 C-USA)
- Head coach: Kermit Davis (12th season)
- Assistant coaches: Win Case; Greg Grensing; Monte Towe
- Home arena: Murphy Center

2013–14 Conference USA men's basketball standings
	Conf.				Overall
Team	W		L	PCT	W		L	PCT
Louisiana Tech	13	–	3	.813	29	–	8	.784
Tulsa †	13	–	3	.813	21	–	13	.618
Middle Tennessee	13	–	3	.813	24	–	9	.727
Southern Miss	13	–	3	.813	29	–	7	.806
UTEP	12	–	4	.750	23	–	11	.676
Old Dominion	9	–	7	.563	18	–	18	.500
Tulane	8	–	8	.500	17	–	17	.500
UAB	7	–	9	.438	18	–	13	.581
Charlotte	7	–	9	.438	17	–	14	.548
FIU*	7	–	9	.438	15	–	16	.484
North Texas	6	–	10	.375	16	–	16	.500
Florida Atlantic	5	–	11	.313	10	–	22	.313
East Carolina	5	–	11	.313	17	–	17	.500
UTSA	4	–	12	.250	8	–	22	.267
Marshall	4	–	12	.250	11	–	22	.333
Rice	2	–	14	.125	7	–	23	.233
† 2014 C-USA Tournament winner Rankings from AP poll *Ineligible for postseason play due to APR penalties

The 2013–14 Middle Tennessee Blue Raiders men's basketball team represented Middle Tennessee State University during the 2013–14 NCAA Division I men's basketball season. The Blue Raiders, led by 12th year head coach Kermit Davis, played their home games at the Murphy Center and were first year members of Conference USA. They finished the season 24–9, 13–3 in C-USA play to finish in a four way tie for the C-USA regular season championship. They advanced to the semifinals of the C-USA tournament where they lost to Tulsa. Despite their 24 wins and conference title, they did not participate in a post season tournament.

== Roster ==
Number	Name	Position	Height	Weight	Year	Hometown
0	Zane Gibson	Guard	6–2	183	Senior	Chattanooga, Tennessee
1	Neiko Hunter	Forward	6–7	221	Senior	Eutaw, Alabama
3	Joshua Phillips	Forward	6–8	220	Freshman	Hendersonville, Tennessee
5	Tweety Knight	Guard	6–1	190	Senior	Rentz, Georgia
10	Jaqawn Raymond	Guard	6–4	197	RS Sophomore	Statesboro, Georgia
11	Tharone Chilton	Guard	6–2	160	Junior	Tulsa, Oklahoma
12	Shawn Jones	Forward	6–8	236	Senior	Hialeah, Florida
13	Blake Johnson	Guard	5-10	160	RS Freshman	Memphis, Tennessee
15	Ronald Ross	Guard	6-3	215	Junior	Indianapolis, Indiana
21	Torin Walker	Center	6–11	240	Senior	Columbus, Georgia
23	Marcus Tarrance	Guard	6–6	210	Junior	Memphis, Tennessee
24	Kerry Hammonds II	Guard/Forward	6–5	210	Senior	Murfreesboro, Tennessee
30	Reggie Upshaw Jr.	Forward	6–7	215	Freshman	Chattanooga, Tennessee
32	Gavin Gibson	Guard	6–4	200	Sophomore	Chattanooga, Tennessee
42	Jacquez Rozier	Forward	6–7	227	Junior	Waynesboro, Georgia

== Schedule ==
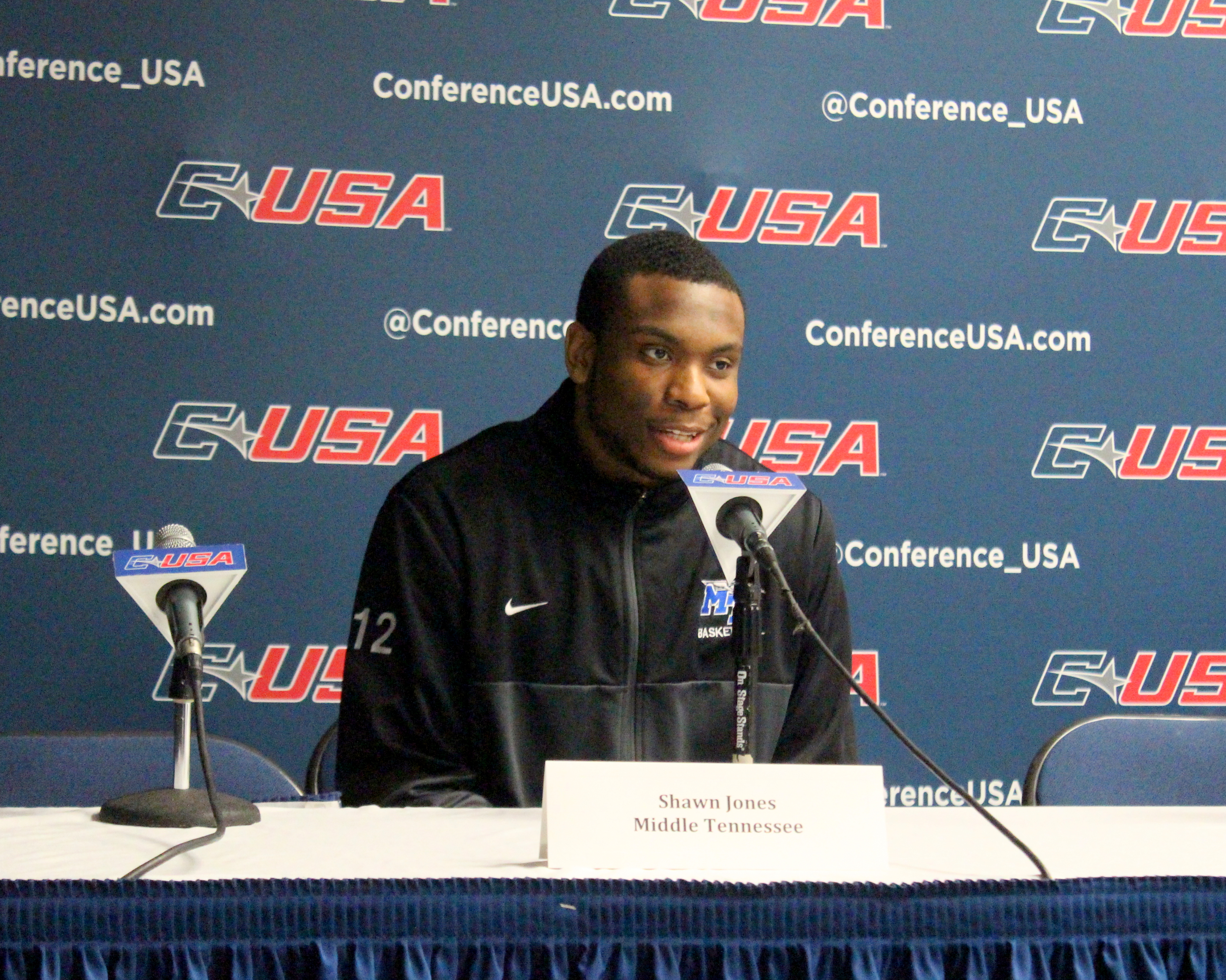
Shawn Jones

Date time, TV	Opponent	Result	Record	Site (attendance) city, state
Exhibition
11/04/2013*; 7:00 pm	Truman State	W 78–66		Murphy Center (1,773); Murfreesboro, TN
Regular season
11/10/2013*; 4:00 pm	Southern; Global Sports Challenge	W 78–75	1–0	Murphy Center (3,307); Murfreesboro, TN
11/13/2012*; 7:00 pm	North Florida; Global Sports Challenge	W 77–70	2–0	Murphy Center (N/A); Murfreesboro, TN
11/16/2013*; 2:00 pm	Akron	W 80–73	3–0	Murphy Center (4,288); Murfreesboro, TN
11/18/2013*; 7:00 pm	Arkansas–Little Rock; Global Sports Challenge	W 76–59	4–0	Murphy Center (N/A); Murfreesboro, TN
11/21/2013*; 6:30 pm, Sun	at No. 16 Florida; Global Sports Challenge	L 59–79	4–1	O'Connell Center (9,020); Gainesville, FL
11/26/2013*; 7:30 pm	at Murray State	W 80–62	5–1	CFSB Center (3,347); Murray, KY
11/30/2013*; 12:00 pm, CSS	South Alabama	W 65–55	6–1	Murphy Center (3,892); Murfreesboro, KY
12/03/2013*; 7:00 pm, WUXP	Belmont	L 58–70	6–2	Murphy Center (7,307); Murfreesboro, KY
12/09/2013*; 7:00 pm	Fisk	W 115–65	7–2	Murphy Center (3,028); Murfreesboro, KY
12/14/2013*; 4:00 pm, CSS	at Ole Miss	L 63–72	7–3	Tad Smith Coliseum (6,186); Biloxi, MS
12/17/2013*; 7:00 pm	Tennessee Temple	W 102–52	8–3	Murphy Center (3,091); Murfreesboro, TN
12/21/2013*; 1:00 pm, FSOH	at Cincinnati	L 48–69	8–4	Fifth Third Arena (5,424); Cincinnati, OH
12/29/2013*; 4:30 pm	vs. Maine; Dr. Pepper Classic	L 85–89 ^{OT}	8–5	McKenzie Arena (3,248); Chattanooga, TN
12/30/2013*; 4:30 pm	vs. Grand Canyon; Dr. Pepper Classic	W 79–56	9–5	McKenzie Arena (2,921); Chattanooga, TN
01/07/2014*; 7:00 pm, WUXP	at Tennessee State	W 74–66	10–5	Gentry Complex (413); Nashville, TN
01/11/2014; 5:00 pm, CSS	UAB	W 89–84 ^{OT}	11–5 (1–0)	Murphy Center (4,605); Murfreesboro, TN
01/16/2014; 7:00 pm, WUXP	UTEP	L 54–63	11–6 (1–1)	Murphy Center (4,793); Murfreesboro, TN
01/16/2014; 7:00 pm	UTSA	W 80–58	12–6 (2–1)	Murphy Center (4,405); Murfreesboro, TN
01/23/2014; 8:00 pm, FS1	at Tulsa	L 53–58	12–7 (2–2)	Reynolds Center (4,179); Tulsa, OK
01/25/2014; 7:00 pm	at North Texas	W 70–63	13–7 (3–2)	The Super Pit (4,429); Denton, TX
01/30/2014; 7:00 pm, WUXP	East Carolina	W 84–67	14–7 (4–2)	Murphy Center (4,411); Murfreesboro, TN
02/01/2014; 5:00 pm, WUXP	Old Dominion	W 64–48	15–7 (5–2)	Murphy Center (4,498); Murfreesboro, TN
02/06/2014; 6:00 pm	at Florida Atlantic	W 67–63	16–7 (6–2)	FAU Arena (1,328); Boca Raton, FL
02/08/2014; 1:00 pm	at Florida International	W 70–68	17–7 (7–2)	U.S. Century Bank Arena (1,217); Miami, FL
02/13/2014; 7:00 pm, WUXP	Tulane	W 71–44	18–7 (8–2)	Murphy Center (4,098); Murfreesboro, TN
02/15/2014; 1:00 pm, CSS	Southern Miss	W 81–64	19–7 (9–2)	Murphy Center (5,102); Murfreesboro, TN
02/20/2014; 7:00 pm	at Charlotte	W 71–49	20–7 (10–2)	Halton Arena (4,108); Charlotte, NC
02/22/2014; 1:00 pm, CSS	at Marshall	W 56–53	21–7 (11–2)	Cam Henderson Center (5,092); Huntington, WV
02/27/2014; 6:30 pm	at Louisiana Tech	L 39–55	21–8 (11–3)	Thomas Assembly Center (5,349); Ruston, LA
03/01/2014; 5:30 pm	Rice	W 65–41	22–8 (12–3)	Murphy Center (6,307); Murfreesboro, TN
03/06/2014; 7:00 pm	at UAB	W 55–53	23–8 (13–3)	Bartow Arena (4,673); Birmingham, AL
Conference USA tournament
03/13/2014; 3:30 pm	vs. Old Dominion; Quarterfinals	W 62–48	24–8	Don Haskins Center (N/A); El Paso, TX
03/14/2014; 3:00 pm, CBSSN	vs. Tulsa; Semifinals	L 69–76	24–9	Don Haskins Center (5,611); El Paso, TX
*Non-conference game. ^{#}Rankings from AP Poll. (#) Tournament seedings in parentheses. All times are in Central Time.
