= Cheikh Sane =

Senegalese basketball player

No. 25 – AMSB
- Position: Power forward
- League: France ProB

Personal information
- Born: May 4, 1992 (age 34) Dakar, Senegal
- Listed height: 6 ft 9 in (2.06 m)
- Listed weight: 225 lb (102 kg)

Career information
- High school: SEED Academy (Dakar, Senegal)
- College: Snow College (2011–2013); Marshall (2013–2015)
- NBA draft: 2015: undrafted
- Playing career: 2015–present

Career history
- 2015–2017: Team FOG Næstved
- 2017: Koroivos
- 2017–2018: Saitama Broncos
- 2018-2019: Horsens IC
- 2020–2021: Starwings Basel
- 2021–2022: AMSB
- 2022–2023: Boulazac Basket
- 2023–2025: Fribourg Olympic
- 2025-today: AMSB

Career highlights
- Danish Cup winner (2017)

Cheikh Tidiane Sane (born May 4, 1992) is a Senegalese professional basketball player for AMSB in ProB French championship. He formerly played professionally in Denmark, Greece, Japan, Switzerland and France.
