= 2013–14 Houston Baptist Huskies men's basketball team =

American college basketball season

2013–14 Houston Baptist Huskies men's basketball
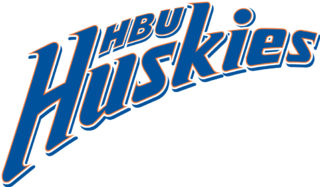
- Conference: Southland Conference
- Record: 6–25 (2–16 Southland)
- Head coach: Ron Cottrell (23rd season)
- Assistant coaches: Steven Key; Justin "Jud" Kinne; Jeremy Case
- Home arena: Sharp Gymnasium (Capacity: 1,000)

2013–14 Southland Conference men's basketball standings
| | Conf. | | | | Overall |
| Team | W | | L | PCT | W | | L | PCT |
|---|---|---|---|---|---|---|---|---|
| Stephen F. Austin † | 18 | – | 0 | 1.000 | 32 | – | 3 | .914 |
| Texas A&M–CC | 14 | – | 4 | .778 | 18 | – | 16 | .529 |
| Sam Houston State | 13 | – | 5 | .722 | 24 | – | 11 | .686 |
| Northwestern State | 12 | – | 6 | .667 | 17 | – | 14 | .548 |
| Incarnate Word* | 9 | – | 5 | .643 | 21 | – | 6 | .778 |
| Oral Roberts | 10 | – | 8 | .556 | 17 | – | 16 | .515 |
| Nicholls State | 10 | – | 8 | .556 | 14 | – | 15 | .483 |
| McNeese State | 9 | – | 9 | .500 | 11 | – | 20 | .355 |
| New Orleans** | 8 | – | 10 | .444 | 11 | – | 15 | .423 |
| Southeastern Louisiana | 7 | – | 11 | .389 | 12 | – | 18 | .400 |
| Central Arkansas | 5 | – | 13 | .278 | 8 | – | 21 | .276 |
| Lamar | 3 | – | 15 | .167 | 4 | – | 26 | .133 |
| Abilene Christian* | 2 | – | 12 | .143 | 11 | – | 20 | .355 |
| Houston Baptist | 2 | – | 16 | .111 | 6 | – | 25 | .194 |
† 2014 Southland tournament winner Rankings from AP poll *ineligible for postseason play due to Div. I transition **ineligible for postseason play due to APR penalties

The 2013–14 Houston Baptist Huskies men's basketball team represented Houston Baptist University in the 2013–14 college basketball season. This was head coach Ron Cottrell's twenty-third season at HBU. The Huskies played their home games at the Sharp Gymnasium and were new members of the Southland Conference. They finished the season 6–25, 2–16 in Southland play to finish in last place. They failed to qualify for the Southland Conference tournament.

== Media ==
All Houston Baptist games will be broadcast online live by Legacy Sports Network (LSN). LSN will also provide online video for every non-televised Huskies home game. However HBU games can air on ESPN3 or Comcast SportsNet Houston as part of the Southland Conference TV packages.

== Roster ==
2013–14 Houston Baptist Huskies men's basketball team
Players
Coaches

| Pos. | # | Name | Height | Weight | Year | Previous school | Hometown |
|---|---|---|---|---|---|---|---|
| G | 2 | Marcel Smith | 5 ft 6 in (1.68 m) | 150 lb (68 kg) | Jr | Academy for Business and Technology in Melvindale | Detroit, MI |
| G | 3 | Tyler Russell | 6 ft 0 in (1.83 m) | 180 lb (82 kg) | Jr | Millennium | Goodyear, AZ |
| C | 4 | Cody Stetler | 6 ft 9 in (2.06 m) | 245 lb (111 kg) | Fr | Hoisington | Hoisington, KS |
| F | 5 | Fred Richardson III | 6 ft 5 in (1.96 m) | 210 lb (95 kg) | So | Clear Brook; Oregon | Houston, TX |
| G | 10 | Jimmy Barton | 5 ft 10 in (1.78 m) | 160 lb (73 kg) | Fr | DeSmet | St. Louis, MO |
| G | 11 | Mike Turner | 6 ft 0 in (1.83 m) | 170 lb (77 kg) | So | St. Francis Academy; Georgia College | Alpharetta, GA |
| G | 12 | Rob Lewis | 5 ft 11 in (1.8 m) | 180 lb (82 kg) | So | Clear Lake | Clear Lake, TX |
| G | 15 | Reveal Chukwujekwu | 6 ft 3 in (1.91 m) | 205 lb (93 kg) | Fr | Strake Jesuit | Houston, TX |
| F | 21 | Colter Lasher | 6 ft 7 in (2.01 m) | 210 lb (95 kg) | Fr | Dimond; Impact Prep | Anchorage, AK |
| G/F | 22 | Dauson Womack | 6 ft 6 in (1.98 m) | 205 lb (93 kg) | So | North Cobb Christian; South Mountain CC | Milwaukee, WI |
| F | 23 | Alex Fountain | 6 ft 7 in (2.01 m) | 200 lb (91 kg) | Fr | Wartburg Central | Wartburg, TN |
| G | 25 | Jacob Gonzales | 6 ft 0 in (1.83 m) | 180 lb (82 kg) | Fr | Pasadena Memorial | Pasadena, TX |
| G/F | 34 | Caleb Crayton | 6 ft 3 in (1.91 m) | 205 lb (93 kg) | So | Northeast Academy | Oklahoma City, OK |
| F | 42 | Cody Joyce | 6 ft 8 in (2.03 m) | 220 lb (100 kg) | So | Southern | Churchton, MD |
| F/C | 55 | Ričmonds Vilde | 6 ft 11 in (2.11 m) | 255 lb (116 kg) | RS Sr | Lee Academy; SMU | Riga, Latvia |

Head coach

- Ron Cottrell (Arkansas)

Assistant coach(es)

- Steven Key (Houston Baptist)
- Justin 'Jud' Kinne (Albion)
- Jeremy Case (Kansas)

Legend

- (C) Team captain
- (S) Suspended
- (I) Ineligible
- (W) Walk-on
- Injured
- Current redshirt

== Schedule and results ==
| Date time, TV | Opponent | Result | Record | Site (attendance) city, state |
Non-Conference Schedule
| 11/08/2013*; 7:00 pm, FCS Atlantic | at Texas Tech | L 61–76 | 0–1 | United Spirit Arena (5,295); Lubbock, TX |
| 11/11/2013*; 7:30 pm, LSN | Crowley's Ridge | W 75–61 | 1–1 | Sharp Gymnasium (547); Houston, TX |
| 11/18/2013*; 6:00 pm, LHN | at Texas; CBE Hall of Fame Classic | L 61–89 | 1–2 | Frank Erwin Center (6,943); Austin, TX |
| 11/22/2013*; 4:00 pm | vs. Wright State; CBE Hall of Fame Classic | L 59–75 | 1–3 | Mitchell Center (3,061); Mobile, AL |
| 11/23/2013*; 3:00 pm | vs. Southern Miss; CBE Hall of Fame Classic | L 62–67 | 1–4 | Mitchell Center (1,614); Mobile, AL |
| 11/24/2013*; 2:00 pm | at South Alabama; CBE Hall of Fame Classic | L 59–79 | 1–5 | Mitchell Center (1,572); Mobile, AL |
| 11/30/2013*; 12:00 pm, PLN | at Army | W 74–72 ^{OT} | 2–5 | Christl Arena (706); West Point, NY |
| 12/04/2013*; 7:30 pm, LSN | Rice | W 73–71 | 3–5 | Sharp Gymnasium (724); Houston, TX |
| 12/07/2013*; 11:00 am | at No. 22 Michigan | L 53–107 | 3–6 | Crisler Center (12,579); Ann Arbor, MI |
| 12/14/2013*; 7:30 pm, LSN | UT Arlington | L 70–80 | 3–7 | Sharp Gymnasium (614); Houston, TX |
| 12/18/2013*; 8:00 pm, FS2 | at DePaul | L 58–78 | 3–8 | Allstate Arena (5,101); Chicago, IL |
| 12/21/2013*; 3:00 pm, TV-32 | at Pepperdine | L 64–76 | 3–9 | Firestone Fieldhouse (810); Malibu, CA |
Conference Schedule
| 01/02/2014; 7:30 pm, FCS | at Oral Roberts | L 55–88 | 3–10 (0–1) | Mabee Center (3,407); Tulsa, OK |
| 01/04/2014; 4:00 pm | at Central Arkansas | L 69–86 | 3–11 (0–2) | Farris Center (612); Conway, AR |
| 01/09/2014; 7:30 pm, LSN | Stephen F. Austin | L 50–77 | 3–12 (0–3) | Sharp Gymnasium (922); Houston, TX |
| 01/11/2014; 7:30 pm, LSN | Northwestern State | W 98–97 | 4–12 (1–3) | Sharp Gymnasium (515); Houston, TX |
| 01/16/2014; 7:30 pm | at Nicholls State | L 64–66 | 4–13 (1–4) | Stopher Gym (542); Thibodaux, LA |
| 01/18/2014; 3:00 pm, ESPN3 | at McNeese State | L 68–70 | 4–14 (1–5) | Burton Coliseum (1,447); Lake Charles, LA |
| 01/23/2014; 7:30 pm, LSN | New Orleans | L 66–79 | 4–15 (1–6) | Sharp Gymnasium (682); Houston, TX |
| 01/25/2014; 7:30 pm, LSN | Southeastern Louisiana | L 52–60 | 4–16 (1–7) | Sharp Gymnasium (894); Houston, TX |
| 01/30/2014; 7:30 pm | at Lamar | L 57–59 | 4–17 (1–8) | Montagne Center (2,145); Beaumont, TX |
| 02/01/2014; 4:00 pm | at Sam Houston State | L 63–81 | 4–18 (1–9) | Bernard Johnson Coliseum (1,036); Huntsville, TX |
| 02/06/2014; 7:30 pm | at Abilene Christian | L 81–87 | 4–19 (1–10) | Moody Coliseum (955); Abilene, TX |
| 02/08/2014; 4:00 pm | at Incarnate Word | L 82–89 ^{OT} | 4–20 (1–11) | McDermott Convocation Center (802); San Antonio, TX |
| 02/13/2014; 7:30 pm, LSN | Oral Roberts | L 66–80 | 4–21 (1–12) | Sharp Gymnasium (751); Houston, TX |
| 02/15/2014; 7:30 pm, LSN | Central Arkansas | W 99–83 | 5–21 (2–12) | Sharp Gymnasium (714); Houston, TX |
| 02/22/2014; 7:30 pm, LSN | Texas A&M–Corpus Christi | L 61–66 | 5–22 (2–13) | Sharp Gymnasium (870); Houston, TX |
| 02/25/2014*; 7:30 pm | Arlington Baptist | W 107–55 | 6–22 | Sharp Gymnasium (413); Houston, TX |
| 03/01/2014; 7:00 pm | at Texas A&M–Corpus Christi | L 45–65 | 6–23 (2–14) | American Bank Center (2,152); Corpus Christi, TX |
| 03/06/2014; 7:30 pm, LSN | Nicholls State | L 62–75 | 6–24 (2–15) | Sharp Gymnasium (553); Houston, TX |
| 03/08/2014; 7:30 pm, LSN | McNeese State | L 77–79 | 6–25 (2–16) | Sharp Gymnasium (913); Houston, TX |
*Non-conference game. ^{#}Rankings from AP Poll. (#) Tournament seedings in parentheses. All times are in Central.
