= 2013–14 UTEP Miners men's basketball team =

American college basketball season

2013–14 UTEP Miners men's basketball

Sun Bowl Invitational Champions

CBI first round vs. Fresno State, L 56–61
- Conference: Conference USA
- Record: 23–11 (12–4 C-USA)
- Head coach: Tim Floyd (4th season)
- Assistant coaches: Phil L. Johnson; Bob Cantu; Ken DeWeese
- Home arena: Don Haskins Center

2013–14 Conference USA men's basketball standings
	Conf.				Overall
Team	W		L	PCT	W		L	PCT
Louisiana Tech	13	–	3	.813	29	–	8	.784
Tulsa †	13	–	3	.813	21	–	13	.618
Middle Tennessee	13	–	3	.813	24	–	9	.727
Southern Miss	13	–	3	.813	29	–	7	.806
UTEP	12	–	4	.750	23	–	11	.676
Old Dominion	9	–	7	.563	18	–	18	.500
Tulane	8	–	8	.500	17	–	17	.500
UAB	7	–	9	.438	18	–	13	.581
Charlotte	7	–	9	.438	17	–	14	.548
FIU*	7	–	9	.438	15	–	16	.484
North Texas	6	–	10	.375	16	–	16	.500
Florida Atlantic	5	–	11	.313	10	–	22	.313
East Carolina	5	–	11	.313	17	–	17	.500
UTSA	4	–	12	.250	8	–	22	.267
Marshall	4	–	12	.250	11	–	22	.333
Rice	2	–	14	.125	7	–	23	.233
† 2014 C-USA Tournament winner Rankings from AP poll *Ineligible for postseason play due to APR penalties

The 2013–14 UTEP Miners basketball team represented the University of Texas at El Paso during the 2013–14 NCAA Division I men's basketball season. The Miners, led by fourth year head coach Tim Floyd, played their home games at the Don Haskins Center and were members of Conference USA. They finished the season 23–11, 12–4 in C-USA play to finish in fifth place. They advanced to the quarterfinals of the C-USA tournament where they lost to Southern Miss. They were invited to the College Basketball Invitational where they lost in the first round to Fresno State. UTEP averaged 8,088 fans per game, ranking 58th nationally.

== Roster ==
Number	Name	Position	Height	Weight	Year	Hometown
2	Aaron Jones	Guard	5–10	175	Freshman	El Paso, Texas
3	Victor Mbachu	Guard	6–1	165	Junior	Houston, Texas
4	Julian Washburn	Forward/Guard	6–8	210	Junior	Duncanville, Texas
5	C. J. Cooper	Guard	6–0	180	Junior	La Verne, California
11	Jake Flaggert	Forward/Guard	6–7	195	Freshman	Lucas, Texas
13	McKenzie Moore	Guard	6–6	200	Junior	Pleasant Hill, California
15	Tevin Caldwell	Guard	6–3	180	Junior	El Paso, Texas
20	Josh Brown	Guard	5–11	185	Freshman	Los Angeles, California
21	John Bohannon	Center	6–10	211	Senior	Lancaster, Texas
23	Hooper Vint	Center	6–11	235	Sophomore	Van Buren, Arkansas
24	Alvin Jones	Guard	5–10	180	Freshman	El Paso, Texas
31	Cedrick Lang	Forward	6–10	255	Junior	Sioux Falls, South Dakota
32	Vince Hunter	Forward	6–8	200	Freshman	Detroit, Michigan
33	Darnell Vandivort	Guard	6–1	145	Freshman	El Paso, Texas
35	Tyler Tafoya	Guard	6–3	195	Senior	El Paso, Texas
41	Matt Willms	Center	7–1	220	Freshman	Leamington, Ontario

== Schedule ==
Date time, TV	Opponent	Result	Record	Site (attendance) city, state
Exhibition
11/02/2013*; 7:05 pm	Southeastern Oklahoma	W 91–63	–	Don Haskins Center (6,084); El Paso, TX
01/04/2014*; 7:05 pm	Angelo State	L 70–75	–	Don Haskins Center (6,152); El Paso, TX
Regular season
11/09/2013*; 7:05 pm	Loyola (New Orleans)	W 84–49	1–0	Don Haskins Center (7,589); El Paso, TX
11/15/2013*; 7:00 pm, ESPN3	at New Mexico State; The Battle of I-10	L 73–86	1–1	Pan American Center (10,019); Las Cruces, NM
11/17/2013*; 7:05 pm	West Alabama; Battle 4 Atlantis Opening Round	W 67–46	2–1	Don Haskins Center (6,331); El Paso, TX
11/19/2013*; 7:05 pm	Colorado State	W 82–74	3–1	Don Haskins Center (7,137); El Paso, TX
11/23/2013*; 7:05 pm	New Mexico State; The Battle of I-10	L 68–77	3–2	Don Haskins Center (11,127); El Paso, TX
11/28/2013*; 7:30 pm, NBCSN	vs. Tennessee; Battle 4 Atlanis First Round	W 78–70	4–2	Imperial Arena (1,416); Nassau, BAH
11/29/2013*; 5:00 pm, NBCSN	vs. No. 23 Iowa; Battle 4 Atlanis semifinals	L 53–89	4–3	Imperial Arena (2,664); Nassau, BAH
11/30/2013*; 5:00 pm, NBCSN	vs. No. 2 Kansas; Battle 4 Atlanis 3rd Place Game	L 63–67	4–4	Imperial Arena (3,350); Nassau, BAH
12/07/2013*; 7:05 pm	Sacramento State	W 69–51	5–4	Don Haskins Center (7,524); El Paso, TX
12/16/2013*; 7:05 pm	New Orleans	L 69–71	5–5	Don Haskins Center (6,344); El Paso, TX
12/19/2013*; 7:05 pm	Northwestern State	W 84–74	6–5	Don Haskins Center (6,363); El Paso, TX
12/21/2013*; 6:30 pm, P12N	at Washington State	W 64–51	7–5	Beasley Coliseum (1,823); Pullman, WA
12/23/2013*; 7:05 pm	Montana State	W 70–55	8–5	Don Haskins Center (6,875); El Paso, TX
12/28/2013*; 7:00 pm	Western Illinois; Sun Bowl Invitational	W 67–64	9–5	Don Haskins Center (6,132); El Paso, TX
12/29/2013*; 7:00 pm	Denver; Sun Bowl Invitational	W 60–54 ^{2OT}	10–5	Don Haskins Center (6,244); El Paso, TX
01/09/2014; 7:05 pm, CBSSN	Charlotte	L 68–73	10–6 (0–1)	Don Haskins Center (7,625); El Paso, TX
01/11/2014; 7:05 pm	Marshall	W 66–56	11–6 (1–1)	Don Haskins Center (7,551); El Paso, TX
01/16/2014; 6:00 pm	at Middle Tennessee	W 63–54	12–6 (2–1)	Murphy Center (4,793); Murfreesboro, TN
01/18/2014; 6:00 pm	at UAB	W 63–61	13–6 (3–1)	Bartow Arena (6,123); Birmingham, AL
01/25/2014; 2:00 pm, CSS	UTSA	W 81–62	14–6 (4–1)	Don Haskins Center (8,692); El Paso, TX
01/30/2014; 7:05 pm	Louisiana Tech	W 89–79	15–6 (5–1)	Don Haskins Center (8,361); El Paso, TX
02/01/2014; 7:05 pm	Rice	W 68–57	16–6 (6–1)	Don Haskins Center (11,036); El Paso, TX
02/06/2014; 7:00 pm, FS1	at East Carolina	W 58–47	17–6 (7–1)	Williams Arena (4,764); Greenville, NC
02/08/2014; 5:00 pm	at Old Dominion	W 63–49	18–6 (8–1)	Ted Constant Convocation Center (6,273); Norfolk, VA
02/13/2014; 7:05 pm	Florida Atlantic	L 69–71	18–7 (8–2)	Don Haskins Center (10,508); El Paso, TX
02/15/2014; 7:05 pm	FIU	W 84–71	19–7 (9–2)	Don Haskins Center (11,176); El Paso, TX
02/20/2014; 6:00 pm	at Tulane	W 72–54	20–7 (10–2)	Devlin Fieldhouse (1,606); New Orleans, LA
02/22/2014; 4:00 pm, CBSSN	at Southern Miss	L 68–77	20–8 (10–3)	Reed Green Coliseum (5,705); Hattiesburg, MS
02/27/2014; 7:05 pm	Tulsa	L 60–65	20–9 (10–4)	Don Haskins Center (11,019); El Paso, TX
03/02/2014; 1:00 pm, TWCS	at North Texas	W 74–54	21–9 (11–4)	Super Pit (N/A); Denton, TX
03/06/2014; 6:00 pm	at UTSA	W 61–51	22–9 (12–4)	Convocation Center (1,688); San Antonio, TX
Conference USA tournament
03/12/2014; 6:00 pm	East Carolina; Second round	W 77–68	23–9	Don Haskins Center (8,277); El Paso, TX
03/13/2014; 6:00 pm	Southern Miss; Quarterfinals	L 56–64	23–10	Don Haskins Center (8,252); El Paso, TX
CBI
03/19/2014*; 7:00 pm	Fresno State; First round	L 56–61	23–11	Don Haskins Center (5,688); El Paso, TX
*Non-conference game. ^{#}Rankings from AP Poll. (#) Tournament seedings in parentheses. All times are in Mountain Time.

== See also ==
- 2013–14 UTEP Lady Miners basketball team
