= 2013–14 Stephen F. Austin Lumberjacks basketball team =

American college basketball season

2013–14 Stephen F. Austin Lumberjacks basketball

Southland Regular Season and tournament champions

NCAA tournament, Round of 32
- Conference: Southland Conference
- Record: 32–3 (18–0 Southland)
- Head coach: Brad Underwood (1st season)
- Assistant coaches: Mike Boynton; Stephen Gentry; Erik Pastrana
- Home arena: William R. Johnson Coliseum

2013–14 Southland Conference men's basketball standings
	Conf.				Overall
Team	W		L	PCT	W		L	PCT
Stephen F. Austin †	18	–	0	1.000	32	–	3	.914
Texas A&M–CC	14	–	4	.778	18	–	16	.529
Sam Houston State	13	–	5	.722	24	–	11	.686
Northwestern State	12	–	6	.667	17	–	14	.548
Incarnate Word*	9	–	5	.643	21	–	6	.778
Oral Roberts	10	–	8	.556	17	–	16	.515
Nicholls State	10	–	8	.556	14	–	15	.483
McNeese State	9	–	9	.500	11	–	20	.355
New Orleans**	8	–	10	.444	11	–	15	.423
Southeastern Louisiana	7	–	11	.389	12	–	18	.400
Central Arkansas	5	–	13	.278	8	–	21	.276
Lamar	3	–	15	.167	4	–	26	.133
Abilene Christian*	2	–	12	.143	11	–	20	.355
Houston Baptist	2	–	16	.111	6	–	25	.194
† 2014 Southland tournament winner Rankings from AP poll *ineligible for postseason play due to Div. I transition **ineligible for postseason play due to APR penalties

The 2013–14 Stephen F. Austin Lumberjacks basketball team represented Stephen F. Austin University during the 2013–14 NCAA Division I men's basketball season. The Lumberjacks were led by new head coach Brad Underwood and played their home games at the William R. Johnson Coliseum. They were members of the Southland Conference. They finished the season 32–3, 18–0 in Southland play to claim their second consecutive Southland regular season championship. They were champions of the Southland Conference tournament to earn an automatic bid to the NCAA tournament. In the NCAA Tournament, they upset VCU in the second round before losing in the third round to UCLA.

The team has been regarded in the national media as the biggest "cinderella" team in the NCAA March Madness tournament.

== Roster ==
Number	Name	Position	Height	Weight	Year	Hometown
0	Thomas Walkup	Guard	6–4	195	RS Sophomore	Pasadena, Texas
3	Deshaunt Walker	Guard	6–0	170	Senior	Silver Spring, Maryland
4	Nikola Gajic	Forward	6–5	200	Senior	Bosnia and Herzegovina
5	Justin Dotson	Guard	6–4	215	Freshman	Central, South Carolina
10	Trey Pinkney	Guard	5–9	160	Sophomore	Katy, Texas
12	Dallas Cameron	Guard	6–3	180	Freshman	Pompano Beach, Florida
15	Ben Brown-White	Forward	6–6	210	Freshman	Sugar Land, Texas
25	Desmond Haymond	Guard	6–3	190	Senior	Durant, Mississippi
30	Tanner Clayton	Forward	6–9	210	Junior	San Diego, California
31	Connor Brooks	Guard/Forward	6–4	190	Junior	Manhattan, Kansas
32	Sharife Sergeant	Forward	6–9	235	Junior	Bronx, New York
33	Patrick Costello	Forward	6–9	220	RS Freshman	Houston, Texas
34	Jacob Parker	Forward	6–6	210	Junior	Bixby, Oklahoma

== Schedule ==
Date time, TV	Rank^{#}	Opponent^{#}	Result	Record	Site (attendance) city, state
Exhibition
11/02/2013*; 6:00 pm		Arkansas Tech	W 87–54		William R. Johnson Coliseum (237); Nacogdoches, TX
Regular season
11/08/2013*; 7:00 pm		UT Tyler	W 90–64	1–0	William R. Johnson Coliseum (2,210); Nacogdoches, TX
11/12/2013*; 7:00 pm		at Texas State	W 64–57	2–0	Strahan Coliseum (2,372); San Marcos, TX
11/15/2013*; 7:00 pm, LHN		at Texas	L 62–72	2–1	Frank Erwin Center (7,348); Austin, TX
11/21/2013*; 6:00 pm		at Marshall; Roundball Classic	W 80–73 ^{OT}	3–1	Cam Henderson Center (4,863); Huntington, WV
11/23/2013*; 3:00 pm		at East Tennessee State; Roundball Classic	L 58–66	3–2	Freedom Hall Civic Center (2,535); Johnson City, TN
11/26/2013*; 7:00 pm		Samford; Roundball Classic	W 98–78	4–2	William R. Johnson Coliseum (857); Nacogdoches, TX
11/29/2013*; 6:00 pm		at UNC Wilmington; Roundball Classic	W 60–55	5–2	Trask Coliseum (3,347); Wilmington, NC
12/01/2013*; 1:00 pm		at High Point	W 71–68	6–2	Millis Center (1,003); High Point, NC
12/06/2013*; 8:00 pm		Towson; Lumberjack E-Tech Classic	W 79–69	7–2	William R. Johnson Coliseum (1,823); Nacogdoches, TX
12/07/2013*; 8:00 pm, CSNH/ESPN3		James Madison; Lumberjack E-Tech Classic	W 70–57	8–2	William R. Johnson Coliseum (1,257); Nacogdoches, TX
12/15/2013*; 1:00 pm		at North Texas	W 87–53	9–2	The Super Pit (1,238); Denton, TX
12/21/2013*; 6:00 pm		Elmhurst	W 83–49	10–2	William R. Johnson Coliseum (483); Nacogdoches, TX
12/30/2013*; 8:00 pm		Cal State Northridge	W 74–67	11–2	William R. Johnson Coliseum (674); Nacogdoches, TX
01/02/2014; 8:00 pm		Lamar	W 85–65	12–2 (1–0)	William R. Johnson Coliseum (637); Nacogdoches, TX
01/04/2014; 6:00 pm		Sam Houston State	W 73–56	13–2 (2–0)	William R. Johnson Coliseum (1,046); Nacogdoches, TX
01/09/2014; 7:30 pm, LSN		at Houston Baptist	W 77–50	14–2 (3–0)	Sharp Gymnasium (922); Houston, TX
01/11/2014*; 6:00 pm		at Texas A&M–Corpus Christi	W 80–70	15–2 (4–0)	American Bank Center (1,295); Corpus Christi, TX
01/16/2014; 7:30 pm		at Northwestern State	W 74–58	16–2 (5–0)	Prather Coliseum (1,310); Natchitoches, LA
01/23/2014; 7:00 pm, ESPN3		at Oral Roberts	W 72–69	17–2 (6–0)	Mabee Center (3,484); Tulsa, OK
01/25/2014; 4:00 pm		at Central Arkansas	W 66–49	18–2 (7–0)	Farris Center (1,242); Conway, AR
01/30/2014; 8:00 pm		Abilene Christian	W 64–48	19–2 (8–0)	William R. Johnson Coliseum (2,836); Nacogdoches, TX
02/01/2014; 6:00 pm		Incarnate Word	W 76–74	20–2 (9–0)	William R. Johnson Coliseum (2,632); Nacogdoches, TX
02/06/2014; 8:00 pm		Nicholls State	W 93–64	21–2 (10–0)	William R. Johnson Coliseum (3,687); Nacogdoches, TX
02/08/2014; 6:00 pm		McNeese State	W 74–54	22–2 (11–0)	William R. Johnson Coliseum (3,275); Nacogdoches, TX
02/13/2014; 7:30 pm		at Lamar	W 78–69	23–2 (12–0)	Montagne Center (2,234); Beaumont, TX
02/15/2014; 4:00 pm, ESPN3		at Sam Houston State	W 67–60	24–2 (13–0)	Bernard Johnson Coliseum (1,884); Huntsville, TX
02/22/2014; 6:00 pm		Northwestern State	W 70–68	25–2 (14–0)	William R. Johnson Coliseum (7,148); Nacogdoches, TX
02/27/2014; 7:45 pm		at New Orleans	W 103–63	26–2 (15–0)	Lakefront Arena (590); New Orleans, LA
03/01/2014; 4:30 pm		at Southeastern Louisiana	W 75–62	27–2 (16–0)	University Center (486); Hammond, LA
03/06/2013; 8:00 pm		Oral Roberts	W 83–72	28–2 (17–0)	William R. Johnson Coliseum (5,314); Nacogdoches, TX
03/08/2014; 6:00 pm		Central Arkansas	W 85–61	29–2 (18–0)	William R. Johnson Coliseum (5,481); Nacogdoches, TX
Southland tournament
03/14/2014; 5:00 pm, ESPN3		vs. Northwestern State; Semifinals	W 85–78	30–2	Merrell Center (3,071); Katy, TX
03/15/2014; 7:30 pm, ESPN2		vs. Sam Houston State; Championship	W 68–49	31–2	Merrell Center (3,740); Katy, TX
NCAA tournament
03/21/2014; 6:27 pm, truTV	No. (12 S)	vs. No. 24 (5 S) VCU; Second round	W 77–75 ^{OT}	32–2	Viejas Arena (11,488); San Diego, CA
03/23/2014; 6:10 pm, TBS	No. (12 S)	vs. No. 20 (4 S) UCLA; Third round	L 60–77	32–3	Viejas Arena (11,504); San Diego, CA
*Non-conference game. ^{#}Rankings from AP Poll, (#) denotes seed within region S=South. (#) Tournament seedings in parentheses. All times are in Central Time.
