= 2013–14 Southeastern Louisiana Lions basketball team =

American college basketball season

2013–14 Southeastern Louisiana Lions men's basketball
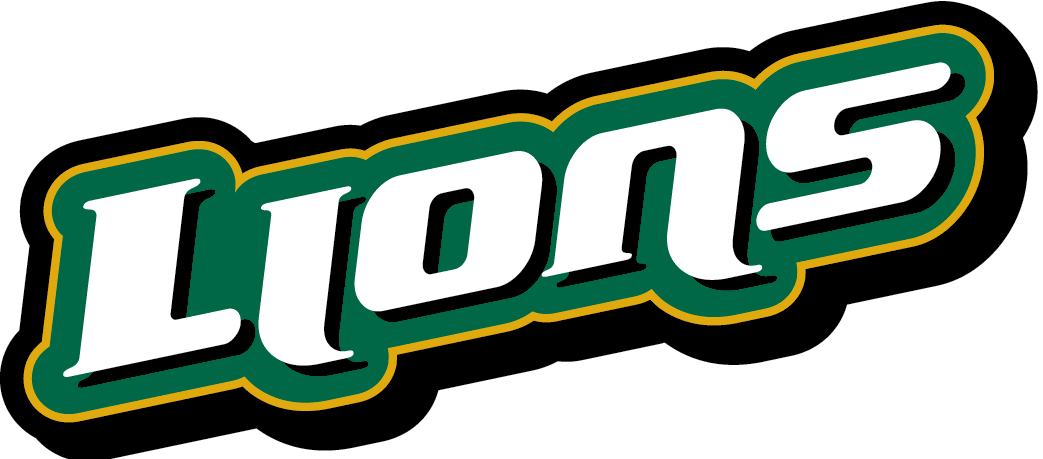
- Conference: Southland Conference
- Record: 12–18 (7–11 Southland)
- Head coach: Jim Yarbrough (9th season)
- Assistant coaches: Larry Cordaro; Alex Hausladen; Michael Cyprien
- Home arena: University Center

2013–14 Southland Conference men's basketball standings
	Conf.				Overall
Team	W		L	PCT	W		L	PCT
Stephen F. Austin †	18	–	0	1.000	32	–	3	.914
Texas A&M–CC	14	–	4	.778	18	–	16	.529
Sam Houston State	13	–	5	.722	24	–	11	.686
Northwestern State	12	–	6	.667	17	–	14	.548
Incarnate Word*	9	–	5	.643	21	–	6	.778
Oral Roberts	10	–	8	.556	17	–	16	.515
Nicholls State	10	–	8	.556	14	–	15	.483
McNeese State	9	–	9	.500	11	–	20	.355
New Orleans**	8	–	10	.444	11	–	15	.423
Southeastern Louisiana	7	–	11	.389	12	–	18	.400
Central Arkansas	5	–	13	.278	8	–	21	.276
Lamar	3	–	15	.167	4	–	26	.133
Abilene Christian*	2	–	12	.143	11	–	20	.355
Houston Baptist	2	–	16	.111	6	–	25	.194
† 2014 Southland tournament winner Rankings from AP poll *ineligible for postseason play due to Div. I transition **ineligible for postseason play due to APR penalties

The 2013–14 Southeastern Louisiana Lions basketball team represented Southeastern Louisiana University during the 2013–14 NCAA Division I men's basketball season. The Lions are led by ninth year head coach Jim Yarbrough and played their home games at the University Center and were members of the Southland Conference. They finished the season 12–18, 7–11 in Southland play to finish in tenth place. They lost in the first round of the Southland Conference tournament to Nicholls State.

== Roster ==
Number	Name	Position	Height	Weight	Year	Hometown
1	Dre Evans	Guard	5–9	170	Senior	Dallas, Texas
2	Devonte Upson	Forward/Center	6–9	205	Junior	Amarillo, Texas
5	JaMichael Hawkins	Guard	6–4	185	Junior	Raymond, Mississippi
11	Antonnio Benton	Forward	6–7	190	Senior	Hattiesburg, Mississippi
12	Antonio Evans	Guard	6–1	176	Freshman	Denham Springs, Louisiana
15	Andrew Guillory	Guard	6–3	200	Junior	Fort Worth, Texas
22	Jeremy Campbell	Guard	6–4	185	Senior	Hattiesburg, Mississippi
23	Joshua Filmore	Guard	6–0	180	Freshman	Orlando, Florida
24	Jeffery Ricard	Guard	6–2	170	Senior	Plaquemine, Louisiana
30	Julian Chiera	Guard	6–5	198	Junior	Cordoba, Argentina
32	Quin Cooper	Forward	6–5	185	Junior	Mandeville, Louisiana
33	Onochie Ochie	Forward	6–6	180	Junior	Albany, Georgia
44	Forrest Johnson	Forward	6–8	235	Freshman	Laurinburg, North Carolina

== Schedule ==
Date time, TV	Opponent	Result	Record	Site (attendance) city, state
Regular season
11/08/2013*; 7:00 pm, ESPN3	at Missouri	W 89–53	0–1	Mizzou Arena (7,929); Columbia, MO
11/12/2013*; 7:00 pm	at Rice	W 63–62	1–1	Tudor Fieldhouse (N/A); Houston, TX
11/14/2013*; 7:00 pm	Champion Baptist	W 108–54	2–1	University Center (543); Hammond, LA
11/22/2013*; 7:00 pm	at LSU	L 66–89	2–2	Pete Maravich Assembly Center (8,404); Baton Rouge, LA
11/26/2013*; 7:00 pm	Western Illinois	W 62–52	3–2	University Center (460); Hammond, LA
11/30/2013*; 7:00 pm	at North Texas	L 61–75	3–3	The Super Pit (1,861); Denton, TX
12/03/2013*; 7:00 pm	at Arkansas	L 65–111	3–4	Bud Walton Arena (11,765); Fayetteville, AR
12/07/2013*; 4:30 pm	Southeast Missouri State	L 73–74	3–5	University Center (302); Hammond, LA
12/13/2013*; 7:00 pm	vs. Mississippi State	L 62–68	3–6	BancorpSouth Arena (2,035); Tupelo, MS
12/21/2013*; 4:00 pm	at UT Martin	W 80–76	4–6	Skyhawk Arena (817); Martin, TN
12/30/2013*; 7:00 pm	Spring Hill	W 75–65	5–6	University Center (432); Hammond, LA
01/02/2014; 7:30 pm	at McNeese State	L 60–69	5–7 (0–1)	Burton Coliseum (1,063); Lake Charles, LA
01/04/2014; 3:30 pm	at Nicholls State	L 61–64	5–8 (0–2)	Stopher Gym (528); Thibodaux, LA
01/09/2014; 7:30 pm	Incarnate Word	W 76–72	6–8 (1–2)	University Center (457); Hammond, LA
01/11/2014; 4:30 pm	Abilene Christian	W 85–77	7–8 (2–2)	University Center (387); Hammond, LA
01/16/2014; 7:30 pm	Sam Houston State	L 78–85	7–9 (2–3)	University Center (454); Hammond, LA
01/18/2014; 4:30 pm	Lamar	W 91–65	8–9 (3–3)	University Center (362); Hammond, LA
01/23/2014; 7:30 pm	at Texas A&M–Corpus Christi	L 71–74	8–10 (3–4)	American Bank Center (1,194); Corpus Christi, TX
01/25/2014; 7:30 pm	at Houston Baptist	W 60–52	9–10 (4–4)	Sharp Gymnasium (894); Houston, TX
01/30/2014; 7:30 pm	New Orleans	L 85–90	9–11 (4–5)	University Center (539); Hammond, LA
02/06/2014; 7:00 pm	at Central Arkansas	L 71–85	9–12 (4–6)	Farris Center (922); Conway, AR
02/08/2014; 7:00 pm	at Oral Roberts	L 54–71	9–13 (4–7)	Mabee Center (6,035); Tulsa, OK
02/13/2014; 7:30 pm	McNeese State	W 62–53	10–13 (5–7)	University Center (785); Hammond, LA
02/15/2014; 4:30 pm	Nicholls State	W 71–66	11–13 (6–7)	University Center (601); Hammond, LA
02/20/2014; 7:45 pm	at New Orleans	L 58–67	11–14 (6–8)	Lakefront Arena (792); New Orleans, LA
02/27/2014; 7:30 pm, ESPN3	Northwestern State	L 83–88	11–15 (6–9)	University Center (1,004); Hammond, LA
03/01/2014; 4:30 pm	Stephen F. Austin	L 62–75	11–16 (6–10)	University Center (486); Hammond, LA
03/06/2014; 7:45 pm	at Sam Houston State	L 54–71	11–17 (6–11)	Bernard Johnson Coliseum (1,187); Huntsville, TX
03/08/2014; 6:00 pm	at Lamar	W 71–62	12–17 (7–11)	Montagne Center (2,002); Beaumont, TX
2014 Southland tournament
03/12/2014; 5:00 pm	vs. Nicholls State; First round	L 64–71	12–18	Merrell Center (1,009); Katy, TX
*Non-conference game. ^{#}Rankings from AP Poll. (#) Tournament seedings in parentheses. All times are in Central Time.

== See also ==
- 2013–14 Southeastern Louisiana Lady Lions basketball team
