= 2014 Southland Conference men's basketball tournament =

- Classification: Division I
- Season: 2013–14
- Teams: 8
- Site: Merrell Center; Katy, Texas
- Champions: Stephen F. Austin (2nd title)
- Winning coach: Brad Underwood (1st title)
- MVP: Thomas Walkup (Stephen F. Austin)
- Attendance: 3,740 (championship)

2013–14 Southland Conference men's basketball standings
| | Conf. | | | | Overall |
| Team | W | | L | PCT | W | | L | PCT |
|---|---|---|---|---|---|---|---|---|
| Stephen F. Austin † | 18 | – | 0 | 1.000 | 32 | – | 3 | .914 |
| Texas A&M–CC | 14 | – | 4 | .778 | 18 | – | 16 | .529 |
| Sam Houston State | 13 | – | 5 | .722 | 24 | – | 11 | .686 |
| Northwestern State | 12 | – | 6 | .667 | 17 | – | 14 | .548 |
| Incarnate Word* | 9 | – | 5 | .643 | 21 | – | 6 | .778 |
| Oral Roberts | 10 | – | 8 | .556 | 17 | – | 16 | .515 |
| Nicholls State | 10 | – | 8 | .556 | 14 | – | 15 | .483 |
| McNeese State | 9 | – | 9 | .500 | 11 | – | 20 | .355 |
| New Orleans** | 8 | – | 10 | .444 | 11 | – | 15 | .423 |
| Southeastern Louisiana | 7 | – | 11 | .389 | 12 | – | 18 | .400 |
| Central Arkansas | 5 | – | 13 | .278 | 8 | – | 21 | .276 |
| Lamar | 3 | – | 15 | .167 | 4 | – | 26 | .133 |
| Abilene Christian* | 2 | – | 12 | .143 | 11 | – | 20 | .355 |
| Houston Baptist | 2 | – | 16 | .111 | 6 | – | 25 | .194 |
† 2014 Southland tournament winner Rankings from AP poll *ineligible for postseason play due to Div. I transition **ineligible for postseason play due to APR penalties

The 2014 Southland Conference men's basketball tournament, a part of the 2013–14 NCAA Division I men's basketball season, took place March 12–15 at the Merrell Center in Katy, Texas. The winner of the tournament received the Southland Conference's automatic bid to the 2014 NCAA tournament.

== Bracket ==
First round Wednesday, March 12; SLC Digital
5 | Nicholls State | 71
8 | SE Louisiana | 64
6 | Oral Roberts | 66
7 | McNeese State | 62

Quarterfinals; Thursday, March 13; SLC Digital
4 | Northwestern State | 88
5 | Nicholls State | 72
3 | Sam Houston State | 70
6 | Oral Roberts | 61

Semifinals; Friday, March 14; ESPN3
1 | Stephen F. Austin | 85
4 | Northwestern State | 78
2 | Texas A&M–CC | 63
3 | Sam Houston State | 69

Championship; Saturday, March 15; ESPN2
1 | Stephen F. Austin | 68
3 | Sam Houston State | 49
