= 2013–14 New Orleans Privateers men's basketball team =

American college basketball season

2013–14 New Orleans Privateers men's basketball
- Conference: Southland Conference
- Record: 11–15 (8–10 Southland)
- Head coach: Mark Slessinger (3rd season)
- Assistant coaches: Kenyon Spears; Kris Arkenberg; Kerwin Forges
- Home arena: Lakefront Arena

2013–14 Southland Conference men's basketball standings
	Conf.				Overall
Team	W		L	PCT	W		L	PCT
Stephen F. Austin †	18	–	0	1.000	32	–	3	.914
Texas A&M–CC	14	–	4	.778	18	–	16	.529
Sam Houston State	13	–	5	.722	24	–	11	.686
Northwestern State	12	–	6	.667	17	–	14	.548
Incarnate Word*	9	–	5	.643	21	–	6	.778
Oral Roberts	10	–	8	.556	17	–	16	.515
Nicholls State	10	–	8	.556	14	–	15	.483
McNeese State	9	–	9	.500	11	–	20	.355
New Orleans**	8	–	10	.444	11	–	15	.423
Southeastern Louisiana	7	–	11	.389	12	–	18	.400
Central Arkansas	5	–	13	.278	8	–	21	.276
Lamar	3	–	15	.167	4	–	26	.133
Abilene Christian*	2	–	12	.143	11	–	20	.355
Houston Baptist	2	–	16	.111	6	–	25	.194
† 2014 Southland tournament winner Rankings from AP poll *ineligible for postseason play due to Div. I transition **ineligible for postseason play due to APR penalties

The 2013–14 New Orleans Privateers men's basketball team represented the University of New Orleans during the 2013–14 NCAA Division I men's basketball season. The Privateers were led by third year head coach Mark Slessinger and played their home games at Lakefront Arena. They were new members of the Southland Conference. They finished the season 11–15, 8–10 in Southland play to finish in ninth place. Due to APR penalties, they were ineligible for postseason play, including the Southland Conference tournament.

== Roster ==
2013–14 New Orleans Privateers men's basketball team
Players
Coaches

Pos.	#	Name	Height	Weight	Year	Previous school	Hometown
G	0	Tradarrius McPhearson	6 ft 1 in (1.85 m)	195 lb (88 kg)	Sr	Raymond; East Mississippi CC	Edwards, MS
G	1	Tevin Broyles	6 ft 4 in (1.93 m)	210 lb (95 kg)	Fr	Gautier	Gautier, MS
G	2	James Harrison	6 ft 4 in (1.93 m)	210 lb (95 kg)	Fr	Westfield	Houston, TX
G	3	Nate Frye	6 ft 1 in (1.85 m)	205 lb (93 kg)	Fr	Houma	Houma, LA
F	4	Cory Dixon	6 ft 7 in (2.01 m)	205 lb (93 kg)	RS Sr	Argyle; Hutchinson CC; Collin CC; Northwestern State	Argyle, TX
G	5	Christavious Gill	5 ft 8 in (1.73 m)	165 lb (75 kg)	Fr	Alexandria	Alexandria, LA
F	10	Tommy Hobbs	6 ft 5 in (1.96 m)	200 lb (91 kg)	So	South Anchorage	Anchorage, AK
G	11	Isaac Mack	6 ft 1 in (1.85 m)	170 lb (77 kg)	Sr	Arsenal Tech; Panola CC	Indianapolis, IN
G	13	John Reese	6 ft 4 in (1.93 m)	175 lb (79 kg)	So	Anacoco	Leesville, LA
F	14	Terrance Syon	6 ft 6 in (1.98 m)	215 lb (98 kg)	Jr	North Crowley; Navarro JC	Ft. Worth, TX
F	15	Kevin Hill	6 ft 7 in (2.01 m)	210 lb (95 kg)	So	John Ehret	Westwego, LA
G/F	20	Evans Ganapamo	6 ft 5 in (1.96 m)	185 lb (84 kg)	So	Mandeville	France
G/F	22	Micha Walker	6 ft 5 in (1.96 m)	195 lb (88 kg)	Jr	Jonesboro; East Mississippi CC	Jonesboro, AR
F	23	Andre Gonzaque	6 ft 5 in (1.96 m)	215 lb (98 kg)	Fr	Holy Savior Menard Central	Alexandria, LA
G	25	Benjamin James	6 ft 3 in (1.91 m)	200 lb (91 kg)	RS So	North Vermillion	Maurice, LA
G/F	31	Teris Bourgeois	6 ft 5 in (1.96 m)	195 lb (88 kg)	Jr	Clear Springs; San Jacinto JC	League City, TX
F	33	Dalton Galpion	6 ft 7 in (2.01 m)	195 lb (88 kg)	Fr	St. Augustine	New Orleans, LA
C	45	Travis Avery	6 ft 8 in (2.03 m)	215 lb (98 kg)	So	Country Day	Algiers, LA
G/F	55	Matt Derenbecker	6 ft 7 in (2.01 m)	219 lb (99 kg)	RS Jr	Country Day; LSU; Dayton	Metairie, LA

Head coach

- Mark Sleeinger (Aurora)

Assistant coach(es)

- Kenyon Spears (Lamar)
- Kris Arkenberg (Franklin (IN))
- Kerwin Forges (Northwestern State)

Legend

- (C) Team captain
- (S) Suspended
- (I) Ineligible
- (W) Walk-on
- Injured
- Current redshirt

== Schedule ==
Date time, TV	Opponent	Result	Record	Site (attendance) city, state
Regular season
11/12/2013*; 7:30 pm	Millsaps	W 81–45	1–0	Lakefront Arena (1,107); New Orleans, LA
11/19/2013*; 7:00 pm, CST	at LSU	L 54–81	1–1	Pete Maravich Assembly Center (7,513); Baton Rouge, LA
11/23/2013*; 11:00 am, CST	Boise State	L 80–100	1–2	Lakefront Arena (1,894); New Orleans, LA
11/27/2013*; 7:00 pm, OTWC	at Hawaiʻi	L 58–91	1–3	Stan Sheriff Center (5,078); Honolulu, HI
12/07/2013*; 2:00 pm, ESPN3	at Minnesota	L 65–80	1–4	Williams Arena (11,228); Minneapolis, MN
12/14/2013*; 6:15 pm	Champion Baptist	W 101–38	2–4	Lakefront Arena (339); New Orleans, LA
12/16/2013*; 7:00 pm	at UTEP	W 71–69	3–4	Don Haskins Center (6,344); El Paso, TX
12/28/2013*; 3:15 pm, BTN	at #5 Michigan State	L 48–101	3–5	Breslin Student Events Center (14,797); East Lansing, MI
01/02/2014; 7:30 pm	at Nicholls State	L 83–88	3–6 (0–1)	Stopher Gym (842); Thibodaux, LA
01/04/2013; 3:00 pm	at McNeese State	L 69–82	3–7 (0–2)	Burton Coliseum (729); Lake Charles, LA
01/09/2014; 7:45 pm	Abilene Christian	W 87–81	4–7 (1–2)	Lakefront Arena (671); New Orleans, LA
01/11/2014; 6:00 pm	Incarnate Word	L 55–78	4–8 (1–3)	Lakefront Arena (552); New Orleans, LA
01/16/2014; 7:45 pm, ESPN3	Lamar	W 77–55	5–8 (2–3)	Lakefront Arena (571); New Orleans, LA
01/18/2014; 6:00 pm	Sam Houston State	L 70–77	5–9 (2–4)	Lakefront Arena (642); New Orleans, LA
01/23/2014; 7:30 pm	at Houston Baptist	W 79–66	6–9 (3–4)	Sharp Gymnasium (682); Houston, TX
01/25/2014; 6:30 pm	at Texas A&M–Corpus Christi	W 70–62	7–9 (4–4)	American Bank Center (1,810); Corpus Christi, TX
01/30/2014; 7:30 pm	at Southeastern Louisiana	W 90–85	8–9 (5–4)	University Center (539); Hammond, LA
02/06/2014; 7:30 pm, FCS	at Oral Roberts	L 59–79	8–10 (5–5)	Mabee Center (4,224); Tulsa, OK
02/08/2014; 4:00 pm, ESPN3	at Central Arkansas	W 88–79	9–10 (6–5)	Farris Center (1,646); Conway, AR
02/13/2014; 7:45 pm	Nicholls State	W 70–64	10–10 (7–5)	Lakefront Arena (1,142); New Orleans, LA
02/16/2014; 4:15 pm	McNeese State	L 69–72	10–11 (7–6)	Lakefront Arena (748); New Orleans, LA
02/20/2014; 7:45 pm	Southeastern Louisiana	W 67–58	11–11 (8–6)	Lakefront Arena (792); New Orleans, LA
02/27/2014; 7:45 pm	Stephen F. Austin	L 63–103	11–12 (8–7)	Lakefront Arena (590); New Orleans, LA
03/01/2014; 6:15 pm	Northwestern State	L 71–84	11–13 (8–8)	Lakefront Arena (540); New Orleans, LA
03/06/2014; 7:30 pm	at Lamar	L 72–89	11–14 (8–9)	Montagne Center (N/A); Beaumont, TX
03/08/2014; 4:00 pm	at Sam Houston State	L 61–80	11–15 (8–10)	Bernard Johnson Coliseum (1,694); Huntsville, TX
*Non-conference game. ^{#}Rankings from AP Poll. (#) Tournament seedings in parentheses. All times are in Central Time.
