= 2013–14 Northwestern State Demons basketball team =

American college basketball season

2013–14 Northwestern State Demons men's basketball
- Conference: Southland Conference
- Record: 17–14 (12–6 Southland)
- Head coach: Mike McConathy (15th season)
- Assistant coaches: Jeff Moore; Bill Lewit; Jacob Spielbauer
- Home arena: Prather Coliseum

2013–14 Southland Conference men's basketball standings
	Conf.				Overall
Team	W		L	PCT	W		L	PCT
Stephen F. Austin †	18	–	0	1.000	32	–	3	.914
Texas A&M–CC	14	–	4	.778	18	–	16	.529
Sam Houston State	13	–	5	.722	24	–	11	.686
Northwestern State	12	–	6	.667	17	–	14	.548
Incarnate Word*	9	–	5	.643	21	–	6	.778
Oral Roberts	10	–	8	.556	17	–	16	.515
Nicholls State	10	–	8	.556	14	–	15	.483
McNeese State	9	–	9	.500	11	–	20	.355
New Orleans**	8	–	10	.444	11	–	15	.423
Southeastern Louisiana	7	–	11	.389	12	–	18	.400
Central Arkansas	5	–	13	.278	8	–	21	.276
Lamar	3	–	15	.167	4	–	26	.133
Abilene Christian*	2	–	12	.143	11	–	20	.355
Houston Baptist	2	–	16	.111	6	–	25	.194
† 2014 Southland tournament winner Rankings from AP poll *ineligible for postseason play due to Div. I transition **ineligible for postseason play due to APR penalties

The 2013–14 Northwestern State Demons basketball team represented Northwestern State University during the 2013–14 NCAA Division I men's basketball season. The Demons, led by 15th year head coach Mike McConathy, played their home games at Prather Coliseum and were members of the Southland Conference. They finished the season 17–4, 12–6 in Southland play to finish in fourth place. They advanced to the semifinals of the Southland Conference tournament where they lost to Stephen F. Austin.

== Roster ==
Number	Name	Position	Height	Weight	Year	Hometown
0	Tra'von Joseph	Guard	6–5	200	Freshman	Morrow, Louisiana
1	Dustin Adams	Forward	6–7	205	Sophomore	Slidell, Louisiana
2	Tyler Washington	Guard	6–1	175	Redshirt Junior	Port Allen, Louisiana
3	Austin Adams	Forward	6–7	205	Sophomore	Slidell, Louisiana
10	Patrick Robinson	Forward	6–5	200	Senior	Baton Rouge, Louisiana
11	Brandon Williams	Forward	6–7	205	Sophomore	West Palm Beach, Florida
12	Jalan West	Guard	5–10	175	Sophomore	Bossier City, Louisiana
13	Matt Killian	Forward	6–5	180	Sophomore	Hornbeck, Louisiana
20	Dadrian Harris	Guard	6–1	185	Sophomore	Castor, Louisiana
21	Sabri Thompson	Guard	6–3	190	Freshman	Newark, Delaware
22	Brison White	Guard	6–0	185	Senior	Wichita, Kansas
23	Zeek Woodley	Guard	6–2	200	Freshman	Pelican, Louisiana
32	DeQuan Hicks	Forward	6–7	230	Senior	Racine, Wisconsin
33	Ryan King	Forward	6–7	205	Junior	Greensboro, North Carolina
40	Marvin Frazier	Center	6–9	200	Junior	Zwolle, Louisiana
42	Matt LaBato	Forward	6–8	220	Junior	Sulphur, Louisiana
44	Gary Stewart	Guard	6–4	197	Senior	Vidalia, Louisiana

== Radio ==
Most games will be carried live on the Demon Sports Radio Network. There are three affiliates for the Demon Sports Radio Network.

- KZBL (Flagship)
- KSYR
- KTEZ

== Schedule ==
Date time, TV	Opponent	Result	Record	Site (attendance) city, state
Regular season
11/08/2013*; 7:30 pm	Letourneau	W 92–76	1–0	Prather Coliseum (1,612); Natchitoches, LA
11/15/2013*; 7:00 pm	at Auburn	W 111–92	2–0	Auburn Arena (5,823); Auburn, AL
11/16/2013*; 7:00 pm	at LSU	W 88–74	2–1	Pete Maravich Assembly Center (8,756); Baton Rouge, LA
11/21/2013*; 7:00 pm	Louisiana–Monroe	L 80–84 ^{OT}	2–2	Prather Coliseum (1,723); Natchitoches, LA
11/27/2013*; 7:00 pm	at Louisiana–Lafayette	L 74–105	2–3	Cajundome (3,153); Lafayette, LA
11/30/2013*; 3:00 pm	Niagara	W 107–100	3–3	Prather Coliseum (612); Natchitoches, LA
12/07/2013*; 7:00 pm, ESPN3	at No. 16 Memphis	L 76–96	3–4	FedExForum (15,605); Memphis, TN
12/11/2013*; 7:00 pm	at Louisiana Tech	L 71–93	3–5	Thomas Assembly Center (3,547); Ruston, LA
12/14/2013*; 3:00 pm	Louisiana College	W 116–76	4–5	Prather Coliseum (1,354); Natchitoches, LA
12/18/2013*; 8:00 pm, FSSW+	at No. 12 Baylor	L 84–91	4–6	Ferrell Center (5,667); Waco, TX
12/19/2013*; 7:30 pm	at UTEP	L 74–84	4–7	Don Haskins Center (6,363); El Paso, TX
01/02/2014; 7:30 pm	Sam Houston State	L 104–107	4–8 (0–1)	Prather Coliseum (1,221); Natchitoches, LA
01/04/2014; 3:00 pm	Lamar	W 99–85	5–8 (1–1)	Prather Coliseum (1,223); Natchitoches, LA
01/09/2014; 7:30 pm	at Texas A&M–Corpus Christi	L 87–101	5–9 (1–2)	American Bank Center (1,220); Corpus Christi, TX
01/11/2014; 7:30 pm	at Houston Baptist	L 97–98	5–10 (1–3)	Sharp Gymnasium (515); Houston, TX
01/16/2014; 7:30 pm	Stephen F. Austin	L 58–74	5–11 (1–4)	Prather Coliseum (2,310); Natchitoches, LA
01/23/2014; 7:00 pm	at Central Arkansas	W 76–68	6–11 (2–4)	Farris Center (1,012); Conway, AR
01/25/2014; 6:00 pm, FCS	Oral Roberts	W 87–83	7–11 (3–4)	Mabee Center (5,026); Tulsa, OK
01/30/2014; 7:30 pm	Incarnate Word	W 100–86	8–11 (4–4)	Prather Coliseum (2,512); Natchitoches, LA
02/01/2014; 3:00 pm	Abilene Christian	W 84–66	9–11 (5–4)	Prather Coliseum (1,422); Natchitoches, LA
02/06/2014; 7:30 pm, ESPN3	McNeese State	W 85–74	10–11 (6–4)	Prather Coliseum (N/A); Natchitoches, LA
02/08/2014; 3:00 pm	Nicholls State	W 86–73	11–11 (7–4)	Prather Coliseum (2,022); Natchitoches, LA
02/13/2014; 7:45 pm	at Sam Houston State	L 64–67	11–12 (7–5)	Bernard Johnson Coliseum (1,357); Huntsville, TX
02/15/2014; 6:00 pm	at Lamar	W 87–67	12–12 (8–5)	Montagne Center (1,965); Beaumont, TX
02/22/2014; 6:00 pm	at Stephen F. Austin	L 68–70	12–13 (8–6)	William R. Johnson Coliseum (7,148); Nacogdoches, TX
02/27/2014; 7:30 pm, ESPN3	at Southeastern Louisiana	W 88–83	13–13 (9–6)	University Center (1,004); Hammond, LA
03/01/2014; 6:15 pm	at New Orleans	W 84–71	14–13 (10–6)	Lakefront Arena (540); New Orleans, LA
03/06/2014; 7:30 pm	Central Arkansas	W 119–102	15–13 (11–6)	Prather Coliseum (2,312); Natchitoches, LA
03/08/2014; 3:00 pm	Oral Roberts	W 88–82	16–13 (12–6)	Prather Coliseum (2,412); Natchitoches, LA
Southland tournament
03/13/2014; 5:00 pm	vs. Nicholls State; Quarterfinals	W 88–72	17–13	Merrell Center (1,213); Katy, TX
03/14/2014; 5:00 pm	vs. Stephen F. Austin; Semifinals	L 78–85	17–14	Merrell Center (3,071); Katy, TX
*Non-conference game. ^{#}Rankings from AP Poll. (#) Tournament seedings in parentheses. All times are in Central Time..

== See also ==
- 2013–14 Northwestern State Lady Demons basketball team
