= 2013–14 Incarnate Word Cardinals men's basketball team =

American college basketball season

2013–14 Incarnate Word Cardinals men's basketball
- Conference: Southland Conference
- Record: 21–6 (9–5 Southland)
- Head coach: Ken Burmeister (8th season)
- Assistant coaches: Prince Johnson; Brian Curtis; Daryl Ward
- Home arena: McDermott Convocation Center

2013–14 Southland Conference men's basketball standings
	Conf.				Overall
Team	W		L	PCT	W		L	PCT
Stephen F. Austin †	18	–	0	1.000	32	–	3	.914
Texas A&M–CC	14	–	4	.778	18	–	16	.529
Sam Houston State	13	–	5	.722	24	–	11	.686
Northwestern State	12	–	6	.667	17	–	14	.548
Incarnate Word*	9	–	5	.643	21	–	6	.778
Oral Roberts	10	–	8	.556	17	–	16	.515
Nicholls State	10	–	8	.556	14	–	15	.483
McNeese State	9	–	9	.500	11	–	20	.355
New Orleans**	8	–	10	.444	11	–	15	.423
Southeastern Louisiana	7	–	11	.389	12	–	18	.400
Central Arkansas	5	–	13	.278	8	–	21	.276
Lamar	3	–	15	.167	4	–	26	.133
Abilene Christian*	2	–	12	.143	11	–	20	.355
Houston Baptist	2	–	16	.111	6	–	25	.194
† 2014 Southland tournament winner Rankings from AP poll *ineligible for postseason play due to Div. I transition **ineligible for postseason play due to APR penalties

The 2013–14 Incarnate Word Cardinals men's basketball team represented the University of the Incarnate Word during the 2013–14 NCAA Division I men's basketball season. The Cardinals were led by eighth year head coach Ken Burmeister and played their home games at McDermott Convocation Center. They were new members of the Southland Conference.

This was year 1 of a 4-year transitional period for Incarnate Word from DII to DI. During year 1 they only played conference opponents once, with the exception of Abilene Christian, and were classified as a DII school for scheduling purposes. Since Abilene Christian was also transitioning, they played them twice. Incarnate Word could not win the regular season basketball title for the 2013–14 season.

In years 2–4 Incarnate Word will be classified as a DI school for scheduling purposes. They will increase the number of conference games, and they can win the regular season conference title. However Incarnate Word cannot participate in the conference tournament until the 2017–18 season, at which time they will also be able to enter the post-season tournaments, should they win the conference.

They finished this season 21–6, 9–5 in Southland play to finish in fifth place.

== Audio streaming ==
All Incarnate Word games were broadcast on KKYX. KKYX's broadcasts will be available at their website. KUIW Radio also produced a student media broadcast for each non-televised home game, that will be available online, and they will provide streaming of all non-televised home games will be shown via UIW TV.

== Roster ==
2013–14 Incarnate Word Cardinals men's basketball team
Players
Coaches

Pos.	#	Name	Height	Weight	Year	Previous school	Hometown
G	0	Chris Starkes	5 ft 10 in (1.78 m)	160 lb (73 kg)	Fr	Brandeis	San Antonio, TX
G	2	Mitchell Badillo	5 ft 10 in (1.78 m)	165 lb (75 kg)	So	Cy Falls	Houston, TX
G	4	Kyle Hittle	6 ft 4 in (1.93 m)	195 lb (88 kg)	So	New Bruanfels	New Braunfels, TX
G/F	5	Justin Phillipe	6 ft 7 in (2.01 m)	225 lb (102 kg)	Jr	Linden; Navarro	Linden, NJ
G	10	Phillip Johnson	6 ft 4 in (1.93 m)	185 lb (84 kg)	Fr	Edison	New Orleans, LA
G	11	Denzel Livingston	6 ft 4 in (1.93 m)	155 lb (70 kg)	Jr	Waltrip	Houston, TX
G	15	Sam Burmeister	6 ft 4 in (1.93 m)	178 lb (81 kg)	Jr	Churchill	San Antonio, TX
F	21	John Baker	6 ft 5 in (1.96 m)	223 lb (101 kg)	Fr	East Central	Adkins, TX
G	22	Marcus Brock	5 ft 11 in (1.8 m)	180 lb (82 kg)	Fr	Madison	San Antonio, TX
G	25	Joseph Louwagie III	6 ft 1 in (1.85 m)	184 lb (83 kg)	So	Johnson	Morris Plains, NJ
F	32	Winslo Barry	6 ft 10 in (2.08 m)	234 lb (106 kg)	Jr	Christian Life Center; Tyler JC	Nassau
F	33	Anthony Horton	6 ft 8 in (2.03 m)	230 lb (104 kg)	Sr	Clear Springs; Campbell	League City, TX
C	50	Ian Markolf	7 ft 1 in (2.16 m)	260 lb (118 kg)	RS Sr	Churchill; Wisconsin	San Antonio, TX

Head coach

- Ken Burmeister (Saint Mary's)

Assistant coach(es)

- Prince Johnson (Incarnate Word)
- Brian Curtis (Incarnate Word)
- Daryl Ward (Incarnate Word)

Legend

- (C) Team captain
- (S) Suspended
- (I) Ineligible
- (W) Walk-on
- Injured
- Current redshirt

== Schedule ==
Date time, TV	Opponent	Result	Record	Site (attendance) city, state
Regular season
11/08/2013*; 7:30 pm	at Northwood	W 88–72	1–0	(250); Cedar Hill, TX
11/11/2013*; 7:00 pm	at Trinity	W 74–62	2–0	William H. Bell Athletic Center (N/A); San Antonio, TX
11/16/2013*; 1:00 pm	at Huston–Tillotson	W 85–78	3–0	Mary E. Branch Gymnasium (150); Austin, TX
11/19/2013*; 7:00 pm	Northwood	W 106–94	4–0	McDermott Convocation Center (326); San Antonio, TX
11/22/2013*; 7:30 pm	at Southwestern	W 80–61	5–0	Robertson Center (567); Georgetown, TX
11/26/2013*; 7:30 pm	at North Texas	L 67–84	5–1	The Super Pit (N/A); Denton, TX
11/30/2013*; 2:00 pm	Texas A&M International	W 75–56	6–1	McDermott Convocation Center (305); San Antonio, TX
12/04/2013*; 7:00 pm	St. Edward's	W 77–67	7–1	McDermott Convocation Center (224); San Antonio, TX
12/14/2013*; 4:00 pm	McMurry	W 83–56	8–1	McDermott Convocation Center (274); San Antonio, TX
12/16/2013*; 7:00 pm	The Open Bible College	W 96–60	9–1	McDermott Convocation Center (121); San Antonio, TX
12/17/2013*; 7:00 pm	The Open Bible College	W 98–53	10–1	McDermott Convocation Center (217); San Antonio, TX
12/30/2013*; 7:00 pm	Huston–Tillotson	W 102–73	11–1	McDermott Convocation Center (157); San Antonio, TX
01/04/2014*; 4:00 pm	Our Lady of the Lake	W 100–85	12–1	McDermott Convocation Center (352); San Antonio, TX
01/09/2014; 7:30 pm	at Southeastern Louisiana	L 72–76	12–2 (0–1)	University Center (457); Hammond, LA
01/11/2014; 6:00 pm	at New Orleans	W 78–55	13–2 (1–1)	Lakefront Arena (552); New Orleans, LA
01/16/2014; 7:30 pm	Central Arkansas	W 87–72	14–2 (2–1)	McDermott Convocation Center (1,386); San Antonio, TX
01/18/2014; 4:00 pm	Oral Roberts	L 77–79	14–3 (2–2)	McDermott Convocation Center (802); San Antonio, TX
01/23/2014; 7:30 pm, CSNH	Sam Houston State	W 85–74	15–3 (3–2)	McDermott Convocation Center (1,362); San Antonio, TX
01/25/2014; 4:00 pm	Lamar	W 75–64	16–3 (4–2)	McDermott Convocation Center (876); San Antonio, TX
01/30/2014; 7:30 pm	at Northwestern State	L 86–100	16–4 (4–3)	Prather Coliseum (2,512); Natchitoches, LA
02/01/2014; 6:00 pm	at Stephen F. Austin	L 74–76	16–5 (4–4)	William R. Johnson Coliseum (2,632); Nacogdoches, TX
02/06/2014; 7:30 pm	Texas A&M–Corpus Christi	W 82–78	17–5 (5–4)	McDermott Convocation Center (789); San Antonio, TX
02/08/2014; 4:00 pm	Houston Baptist	W 89–82 ^{OT}	18–5 (6–4)	McDermott Convocation Center (802); San Antonio, TX
02/13/2014; 8:00 pm, ESPN3	Abilene Christian	W 80–68	19–5 (7–4)	McDermott Convocation Center (1,786); San Antonio, TX
02/27/2014; 7:30 pm	at McNeese State	L 72–87	19–6 (7–5)	Burton Coliseum (873); Lake Charles, LA
03/01/2014; 3:30 pm	at Nicholls State	W 69–67	20–6 (8–5)	Stopher Gym (465); Thibodaux, LA
03/08/2014; 3:00 pm	at Abilene Christian	W 59–56	21–6 (9–5)	Moody Coliseum (1,500); Abilene, TX
*Non-conference game. ^{#}Rankings from AP Poll. (#) Tournament seedings in parentheses. All times are in Central Time.
