= 2013–14 Abilene Christian Wildcats men's basketball team =

American college basketball season

2013–14 Abilene Christian Wildcats men's basketball
- Conference: Southland Conference
- Record: 11–20 (2–12 Southland)
- Head coach: Joe Golding (3rd season)
- Assistant coaches: Brette Tanner; Brian Burton; Patrice Days
- Home arena: Moody Coliseum

2013–14 Southland Conference men's basketball standings
	Conf.				Overall
Team	W		L	PCT	W		L	PCT
Stephen F. Austin †	18	–	0	1.000	32	–	3	.914
Texas A&M–CC	14	–	4	.778	18	–	16	.529
Sam Houston State	13	–	5	.722	24	–	11	.686
Northwestern State	12	–	6	.667	17	–	14	.548
Incarnate Word*	9	–	5	.643	21	–	6	.778
Oral Roberts	10	–	8	.556	17	–	16	.515
Nicholls State	10	–	8	.556	14	–	15	.483
McNeese State	9	–	9	.500	11	–	20	.355
New Orleans**	8	–	10	.444	11	–	15	.423
Southeastern Louisiana	7	–	11	.389	12	–	18	.400
Central Arkansas	5	–	13	.278	8	–	21	.276
Lamar	3	–	15	.167	4	–	26	.133
Abilene Christian*	2	–	12	.143	11	–	20	.355
Houston Baptist	2	–	16	.111	6	–	25	.194
† 2014 Southland tournament winner Rankings from AP poll *ineligible for postseason play due to Div. I transition **ineligible for postseason play due to APR penalties

The 2013–14 Abilene Christian Wildcats men's basketball team represented Abilene Christian University during the 2013–14 NCAA Division I men's basketball season. The Wildcats were led by third year head coach Joe Golding and played their home games at the Moody Coliseum. They were new members of the Southland Conference. Since this was the first year of a 4-year transition phase from DII to DI, Abilene Christian could participate in the Southland Tournament, and played each conference foe only once, with the exception of Incarnate Word. They finished the season 11–20, 2–12 in Southland play to finish in 12th place.

== Roster ==
Number	Name	Position	Height	Weight	Year	Hometown
0	Riley Payne	Forward	6–5	200	Freshman	Idalou, Texas
1	LaDarrien Williams	Guard	5–10	190	Junior	Austin, Texas
2	Rafael Farley	Guard	6–5	195	Junior	Houston, Texas
3	Parker Wentz	Guard	5–9	160	Sophomore	Lubbock, Texas
4	Michael Grant	Guard	6–5	195	Freshman	McKinney, Texas
5	Julian Edmonson	Guard	6–1	195	Junior	Fort Worth, Texas
10	Chris Blakeley	Guard	6–0	160	Freshman	Richardson, Texas
11	Harrison Hawkins	Forward	6–0	175	Junior	Long Beach, California
12	Austin Cooke	Forward	6–7	210	Sophomore	Scottsdale, Arizona
14	Alexsander Milosavljevic	Forward	6–9	245	Junior	Svilajnac, Serbia
21	James Pegues	Forward	6–6	220	Sophomore	Arlington, Texas
33	Jacob Lancaster	Forward	6–10	235	Junior	Colorado Springs, Colorado
	Christian Albright	Forward	6–7	240	Freshman	Dallas, Texas
	Jaris Tinklenberg	Guard	5–10	150	Freshman	Pantego, Texas

== Schedule ==
Date time, TV	Opponent	Result	Record	Site (attendance) city, state
Regular season
11/09/2013*; 1:00 pm	at Duquesne	L 75–94	0–1	A. J. Palumbo Center (2,482); Pittsburgh, PA
11/11/2013*; 6:00 pm	at St. Bonaventure	L 47–75	0–2	Reilly Center (3,042); Allegany, NY
11/13/2013*; 6:00 pm, ESPN3	at Maryland	L 44–67	0–3	Comcast Center (9,117); College Park, MD
11/17/2013*; 3:37 pm, BTN2/MC-22	at Iowa; Battle 4 Atlantis	L 41–103	0–4	Carver-Hawkeye Arena (14,733); Iowa City, IA
11/19/2013*; 7:00 pm, FSSW+	at TCU	L 64–71	0–5	Daniel-Meyer Coliseum (4,619); Ft. Worth, TX
11/22/2013*; 5:00 pm	vs. Western New Mexico; Angelo State Classic	W 62–44	1–5	Stephens Arena (N/A); San Angelo, TX
11/23/2013*; 5:00 pm	vs. Northern New Mexico; Angelo State Classic	W 78–56	2–5	Stephens Arena (N/A); San Angelo, TX
11/25/2013*; 6:00 pm, FS1	at Xavier; Battle 4 Atlantis	L 65–93	2–6	Cintas Center (9,269); Cincinnati, OH
11/29/2013*; 6:30 pm	vs. West Alabama; Battle 4 Atlantis	L 67–77	2–7	Towson Center (127); Towson, MD
11/30/2013*; 12:00 pm	vs. Towson; Battle 4 Atlantis	L 47–74	2–8	Towson Center (1,120); Towson, MD
12/03/2013*; 7:30 pm	Hillsdale Free Will Baptist	W 93–53	3–8	Moody Coliseum (2,146); Abilene, TX
12/17/2013*; 7:30 pm	Bacone College	W 90–63	4–8	Moody Coliseum (230); Abilene, TX
12/18/2013*; 6:00 pm	Open Bible College	W 87–43	5–8	Moody Coliseum (211); Abilene, TX
12/30/2013*; 1:00 pm	Open Bible College	W 99–49	6–8	Moody Coliseum (230); Abilene, TX
01/09/2014; 7:30 pm	at New Orleans	L 81–87	6–9 (0–1)	Lakefront Arena (671); New Orleans, LA
01/11/2014; 4:00 pm	at Southeastern Louisiana	L 77–85 ^{2OT}	6–10 (0–2)	University Center (387); Hammond, LA
01/16/2014; 7:30 pm	Oral Roberts	L 59–82	6–11 (0–3)	Moody Coliseum (941); Abilene, TX
01/18/2014; 3:00 pm	Central Arkansas	W 73–72	7–11 (1–3)	Moody Coliseum (422); Abilene, TX
01/23/2014; 7:30 pm	Lamar	L 57–65	7–12 (1–4)	Moody Coliseum (732); Abilene, TX
01/25/2014; 3:00 pm, ESPN3	Sam Houston State	L 51–70	7–13 (1–5)	Moody Coliseum (1,500); Abilene, TX
01/30/2014; 8:00 pm	at Stephen F. Austin	L 48–64	7–14 (1–6)	William R. Johnson Coliseum (2,836); Nacogdoches, TX
02/01/2014; 3:00 pm	at Northwestern State	L 66–84	7–15 (1–7)	Prather Coliseum (1,422); Natchitoches, LA
02/06/2014; 7:30 pm	Houston Baptist	W 87–81	8–15 (2–7)	Moody Coliseum (955); Abilene, TX
02/08/2014; 3:00 pm	Texas A&M–Corpus Christi	L 69–71	8–16 (2–8)	Moody Coliseum (1,102); Abilene, TX
02/13/2014; 8:00 pm, ESPN3	at Incarnate Word	L 68–80	8–17 (2–9)	McDermott Convocation Center (1,786); San Antonio, TX
02/15/2014*; 6:00 pm	Dallas Christian	W 108–69	9–17	Moody Coliseum (1,053); Abilene, TX
02/18/2014*; 7:30 pm	Arlington Baptist	W 80–66	10–17	Moody Coliseum (1,106); Abilene, TX
02/22/2014*; 7:00 pm	Southwestern Adventist	W 124–57	11–17	Moody Coliseum (1,222); Abilene, TX
02/27/2014; 7:30 pm	at Nicholls State	L 60–79	11–18 (2–10)	Stopher Gym (347); Thibodaux, LA
03/01/2014; 3:00 pm	at McNeese State	L 91–95 ^{OT}	11–19 (2–11)	Burton Coliseum (872); Lake Charles, LA
03/08/2014; 3:00 pm	Incarnate Word	L 56–59	11–20 (2–12)	Moody Coliseum (1,500); Abilene, TX
*Non-conference game. ^{#}Rankings from AP Poll. (#) Tournament seedings in parentheses. All times are in Central Time.
