= 2013–14 Lamar Cardinals basketball team =

American college basketball season

2013–14 Lamar Cardinals men's basketball
- Conference: Southland Conference
- Record: 4–26 (3–15 Southland)
- Head coach: Pat Knight (3rd season)
- Assistant coaches: Kermit Holmes; Scott Wagers; Sherron Wilkerson
- Home arena: Montagne Center

2013–14 Southland Conference men's basketball standings
	Conf.				Overall
Team	W		L	PCT	W		L	PCT
Stephen F. Austin †	18	–	0	1.000	32	–	3	.914
Texas A&M–CC	14	–	4	.778	18	–	16	.529
Sam Houston State	13	–	5	.722	24	–	11	.686
Northwestern State	12	–	6	.667	17	–	14	.548
Incarnate Word*	9	–	5	.643	21	–	6	.778
Oral Roberts	10	–	8	.556	17	–	16	.515
Nicholls State	10	–	8	.556	14	–	15	.483
McNeese State	9	–	9	.500	11	–	20	.355
New Orleans**	8	–	10	.444	11	–	15	.423
Southeastern Louisiana	7	–	11	.389	12	–	18	.400
Central Arkansas	5	–	13	.278	8	–	21	.276
Lamar	3	–	15	.167	4	–	26	.133
Abilene Christian*	2	–	12	.143	11	–	20	.355
Houston Baptist	2	–	16	.111	6	–	25	.194
† 2014 Southland tournament winner Rankings from AP poll *ineligible for postseason play due to Div. I transition **ineligible for postseason play due to APR penalties

The 2013–14 Lamar Cardinals basketball team represented Lamar University during the 2013–14 NCAA Division I men's basketball season. The Cardinals, led by third year head coach Pat Knight, played their home games at the Montagne Center and were members of the Southland Conference. They finished the season 4–26, 3–15 in Southland play to finish in 13th place. They failed to qualify for the Southland Conference tournament.

After starting the season 3–22, head coach Pat Knight was fired on February 16. He compiled a record of 29–62 in three years. The Cardinals finished the season with Tic Price as interim head coach. The Cardinals finished the season 1–4 under Coach Price. Price was named head coach on March 18, 2014.

== Roster ==
Number	Name	Position	Height	Weight	Year	Hometown
1	Keilan Blanks	Guard	5–9	160	Sophomore	Spring Hill, Tennessee
2	Anthony Holliday	Guard	6–1	170	Junior	Los Angeles, California
3	Donnell Minton	Guard	6–0	145	Sophomore	Indianapolis, Indiana
4	Matt Hancock	Guard	6–4	200	Sophomore	Melbourne, Australia
5	Tyran de Lattibeaudiere	Forward	6–4	203	Junior	Kingston, Jamaica
10	Rhon Mitchell	Forward	6–5	180	Sophomore	Inglewood, California
11	Nimrod Hilliard	Guard	6–0	154	Junior	Madison, Wisconsin
20	Marcus Owens	Guard/Forward	6–1	195	Freshman	Fort Lauderdale, Florida
21	Donovan Ross	Forward	6–5	207	Junior	Ridgeland, Mississippi
22	Preston Mattingly	Guard	6–2	195	Freshman	Evansville, Indiana
24	Octavius Green	Forward	6–6	194	Junior	Gainesville, Florida
34	Amos Wilson	Forward	6–5	205	Senior	Allen, Texas
50	Sebastian Norman	Forward	6–9	235	Junior	Uppsala, Sweden

== Schedule ==
Date time, TV	Opponent	Result	Record	High points	High rebounds	High assists	Site (attendance) city, state
Exhibition
11/01/2013*; 7:00 pm	McMurry	W 66–62		–	–	–	Montagne Center (1,942); Beaumont, TX
Regular season
11/09/2013*; 6:00 pm, FS2	at Butler	L 58–89	0–1	23 – Hilliard	7 – Ross	3 – Mitchell	Hinkle Fieldhouse (9,617); Indianapolis, IN
11/12/2013*; 7:00 pm	George Mason	L 54–68	0–2	16 – Ross	6 – 2 tied	4 – Blanks	Montagne Center (3,984); Beaumont, TX
11/16/2013*; 11:30 pm, Pac-12	at Washington State	L 64–84	0–3	16 – Wilson	5 – 3 tied	4 – Ross	Beasley Coliseum (2,593); Pullman, WA
11/21/2013*; 5:00 pm	vs. Savannah State; Global Sports Showcase	W 75–66	1–3	23 – Ross	11 – Ross	9 – Hilliard	Huntsman Center (N/A); Salt Lake City, UT
11/22/2013*; 8:00 pm, Pac-12	at Utah; Global Sports Showcase	L 57–84	1–4	17 – Mitchell	5 – Mitchell	2 – 3 tied	Huntsman Center (7,751); Salt Lake City, UT
11/23/2013*; 3:00 pm	vs. Grand Canyon; Global Sports Showcase	L 69–78	1–5	22 – Mitchell	11 – Green	5 – Hilliard	Huntsman Center (293); Salt Lake City, UT
11/27/2013*; 7:00 pm	Texas-Pan American	L 61–66	1–6	15 – 2 tied	10 – Green	8 – Hilliard	Montagne Center (1,784); Beaumont, TX
11/30/2013*; 6:00 pm	Arkansas State	L 89–95	1–7	20 – Wilson	6 – Ross	14 – Hilliard	Montagne Center (1,668); Beaumont, TX
12/15/2013*; 2:00 pm	Tennessee Tech	L 74–79	1–8	20 – Wilson	5 – 2 tied	7 – Hilliard	Montagne Center (1,696); Beaumont, TX
12/18/2013*; 6:00 pm	at LIU Brooklyn	L 79–82	1–9	21 – Hilliard	12 – Ross	8 – Blanks	Steinberg Wellness Center (1,237); Brooklyn, NY
12/21/2013*; 3:15 pm	at Canisius	L 74–87	1–10	15 – Green	9 – Green	6 – Holliday	Koessler Athletic Center (1,439); Buffalo, NY
12/28/2013*; 3:00 pm	at Colorado State	L 71–86	1–11	15 – Hilliard	7 – Mattingly	4 – Holliday	Moby Arena (3,706); Ft. Collins, CO
01/02/2014; 8:00 pm	at Stephen F. Austin	L 65–85	1–12 (0–1)	14 – Wilson	6 – 2 tied	5 – Holliday	William R. Johnson Coliseum (637); Nacogdoches, TX
01/04/2014; 3:00 pm	at Northwestern State	L 85–99	1–13 (0–2)	29 – Hilliard	7 – 2 tied	8 – Hilliard	Prather Coliseum (1,223); Natchitoches, LA
01/09/2014; 7:30 pm	Nicholls State	L 60–64	1–14 (0–3)	14 – Wilson	10 – Wilson	3 – Ross	Montagne Center (1,882); Beaumont, TX
01/11/2014; 6:00 pm	McNeese State	L 59–74	1–15 (0–4)	18 – Mitchell	9 – Ross	3 – Hilliard	Montagne Center (2,090); Beaumont, TX
01/16/2014; 7:45 pm, ESPN3	at New Orleans	L 55–77	1–16 (0–5)	13 – Ross	9 – Mitchell	1 – 5 tied	Lakefront Arena (571); New Orleans, LA
01/18/2014; 4:30 pm	at Southeastern Louisiana	L 65–91	1–17 (0–6)	15 – Ross	8 – Ross	4 – 2 tied	University Center (362); Hammond, LA
01/23/2014; 7:30 pm	at Abilene Christian	W 65–57	2–17 (1–6)	16 – Mitchell	11 – Wilson	4 – Hilliard	Moody Coliseum (732); Abilene, TX
01/25/2013; 4:00 pm	at Incarnate Word	L 64–75	2–18 (1–7)	14 – Hilliard	6 – Wilson	4 – 2 tied	McDermott Convocation Center (876); San Antonio, TX
01/30/2014; 7:30 pm	Houston Baptist	W 59–57	3–18 (2–7)	14 – 2 tied	8 – 2 tied	5 – Hilliard	Montagne Center (2,145); Beaumont, TX
02/01/2014; 6:00 pm, ESPN3	Texas A&M-Corpus Christi	L 35–58	3–19 (2–8)	11 – Ross	6 – Ross	3 – Holliday	Montagne Center (2,149); Beaumont, TX
02/08/2014; 4:00 pm	at Sam Houston State	L 70–84	3–20 (2–9)	18 – Mitchell	5 – Hilliard	6 – Hilliard	Bernard Johnson Coliseum (1,218); Huntsville, TX
02/13/2014; 7:30 pm	Stephen F. Austin	L 69–78	3–21 (2–10)	16 – 3 tied	6 – Hilliard	9 – Hilliard	Montagne Center (2,234); Beaumont, TX
02/15/2014; 6:00 pm	Northwestern State	L 67–87	3–22 (2–11)	26 – Mitchell	7 – Norman	7 – Hilliard	Montagne Center (1,965); Beaumont, TX
02/22/2014; 6:00 pm	Sam Houston State	L 71–74	3–23 (2–12)	21 – Hilliard	7 – Wilson	5 – Hilliard	Montagne Center (2,340); Beaumont, TX
02/27/2014; 7:00 pm, FCS	at Oral Roberts	L 67–75	3–24 (2–13)	18 – Holliday	7 – Mitchell	3 – Hilliard	Mabee Center (4,839); Tulsa, OK
03/01/2014; 4:00 pm	at Central Arkansas	L 69–76	3–25 (2–14)	19 – Hilliard	9 – Hilliard	6 – Hilliard	Farris Center (1,044); Conway, AR
03/06/2014; 7:30 pm	New Orleans	W 89–72	4–25 (3–14)	19 – Hilliard	7 – Wilson	11 – Hilliard	Montagne Center (2,235); Beaumont, TX
03/08/2014; 6:00 pm	Southeastern Louisiana	L 62–71	4–26 (3–15)	19 – Wilson	10 – Wilson	7 – Hilliard	Montagne Center (2,002); Beaumont, TX
*Non-conference game. ^{#}Rankings from AP Poll. (#) Tournament seedings in parentheses. All times are in Central Time.
