= 2013–14 Louisiana Tech Bulldogs basketball team =

American college basketball season

2013–14 Louisiana Tech Bulldogs men's basketball

Gulf Coast Showcase Champions Conference USA Regular Season Co-champions

NIT, Quarterfinals
- Conference: Conference USA
- Record: 29–8 (13–3 C-USA)
- Head coach: Michael White (3rd season)
- Assistant coaches: Isaac Brown; Dusty May; Derrick Jones
- Home arena: Thomas Assembly Center

2013–14 Conference USA men's basketball standings
	Conf.				Overall
Team	W		L	PCT	W		L	PCT
Louisiana Tech	13	–	3	.813	29	–	8	.784
Tulsa †	13	–	3	.813	21	–	13	.618
Middle Tennessee	13	–	3	.813	24	–	9	.727
Southern Miss	13	–	3	.813	29	–	7	.806
UTEP	12	–	4	.750	23	–	11	.676
Old Dominion	9	–	7	.563	18	–	18	.500
Tulane	8	–	8	.500	17	–	17	.500
UAB	7	–	9	.438	18	–	13	.581
Charlotte	7	–	9	.438	17	–	14	.548
FIU*	7	–	9	.438	15	–	16	.484
North Texas	6	–	10	.375	16	–	16	.500
Florida Atlantic	5	–	11	.313	10	–	22	.313
East Carolina	5	–	11	.313	17	–	17	.500
UTSA	4	–	12	.250	8	–	22	.267
Marshall	4	–	12	.250	11	–	22	.333
Rice	2	–	14	.125	7	–	23	.233
† 2014 C-USA Tournament winner Rankings from AP poll *Ineligible for postseason play due to APR penalties

The 2013–14 Louisiana Tech Bulldogs basketball team represented Louisiana Tech University during the 2013–14 NCAA Division I men's basketball season. The Bulldogs, led by third year head coach Michael White, played their home games at the Thomas Assembly Center and were first year members of the Conference USA. They finished the season 29–8, 13–3 in C-USA play to finish in a four-way tie for the C-USA regular season championship. They advanced to the championship game of the C-USA tournament where they lost to Tulsa. After tiebreakers, they were the #1 seed in the C-USA Tournament, and as a regular season conference champion and overall #1 seed in their conference tournament who failed to win their conference tournament, they received at automatic bid to the National Invitation Tournament where they defeated Iona and Georgia to advance to the quarterfinals where they lost to Florida State.

== Roster ==
2013–14 Louisiana Tech Bulldogs men's basketball team
Players
Coaches

Pos.	#	Name	Height	Weight	Year	Hometown
G	0	Alex Hamilton	6 ft 4 in (1.93 m)	180 lb (82 kg)	So	Chipley, FL
F	1	Michale Kyser	6 ft 9 in (2.06 m)	205 lb (93 kg)	Jr	Lancaster, TX
F	2	Erik McCree (I)	6 ft 8 in (2.03 m)	220 lb (100 kg)	So	Orlando, FL
G	3	Raheem Appleby	6 ft 4 in (1.93 m)	160 lb (73 kg)	Jr	Jacksonville, AR
G	4	Speedy Smith	6 ft 3 in (1.91 m)	180 lb (82 kg)	Jr	St. Petersburg, FL
F	5	Chris Anderson	6 ft 6 in (1.98 m)	220 lb (100 kg)	Sr	Muskegon, MI
F	10	Isaiah Massey	6 ft 8 in (2.03 m)	225 lb (102 kg)	RS Jr	McDonough, GA
F	11	Stojan Gjuroski	6 ft 8 in (2.03 m)	205 lb (93 kg)	RS Jr	Gostivar, Macedonia
G	15	Cordarius Johnson	6 ft 6 in (1.98 m)	220 lb (100 kg)	Sr	Coushatta, LA
G	21	Kenyon McNeail	6 ft 1 in (1.85 m)	190 lb (86 kg)	Sr	Conway, AR
F	22	Josh Butler (W)	6 ft 6 in (1.98 m)	225 lb (102 kg)	Fr	Los Angeles, CA
G	23	Jaron Johnson	6 ft 6 in (1.98 m)	205 lb (93 kg)	Sr	Tyler, TX
F	33	Leo Edwards	6 ft 8 in (2.03 m)	230 lb (104 kg)	Fr	Detroit, MI
F/C	40	Gilbert Talbot	6 ft 10 in (2.08 m)	290 lb (132 kg)	So	Houma, LA

Head coach

- Michael White (Mississippi)

Assistant coach(es)

- Isaac Brown (Louisiana–Monroe)
- Dusty May (Indiana)
- Derrick Jones (Samford)

Legend

- (C) Team captain
- (S) Suspended
- (I) Ineligible
- (W) Walk-on
- Injured
- Current redshirt

Roster
Last update: 2013-10-10

== Schedule ==
Date time, TV	Rank^{#}	Opponent^{#}	Result	Record	Site (attendance) city, state
Exhibition
October 31, 2013*; 6:30 pm		Arkansas–Monticello	W 85–64	–	Scotty Robertson Memorial Gymnasium (N/A); Ruston, LA
November 4, 2013*; 6:30 pm		Southern Arkansas	W 100–49	–	Thomas Assembly Center (N/A); Ruston, LA
Regular season
November 8, 2013*; 10:30 pm		at Saint Mary's	L 70–83	0–1	McKeon Pavilion (2,825); Moraga, CA
November 13, 2013*; 6:30 pm		Centenary; Gulf Coast Showcase Opening Round	W 106–59	1–1	Thomas Assembly Center (3,942); Ruston, LA
November 20, 2013*; 7:00 pm		at Central Arkansas	W 94–57	2–1	Farris Center (1,547); Conway, AR
November 25, 2013*; 11:00 am		vs. UNC Greensboro; Gulf Coast Showcase Quarterfinals	W 99–62	3–1	Germain Arena (N/A); Estero, FL
November 26, 2013*; 5:00 pm		vs. UIC; Gulf Coast Showcase Semifinals	W 103–78	4–1	Germain Arena (N/A); Estero, FL
November 27, 2013*; 7:30 pm		vs. St. Bonaventure; Gulf Coast Showcase Finals	W 76–72	5–1	Germain Arena (N/A); Estero, FL
December 1, 2013*; 5:00 pm		at Jackson State	W 72–61	6–1	Williams Assembly Center (608); Jackson, MS
December 4, 2013*; 6:30 pm		Louisiana–Lafayette	L 80–89	6–2	Thomas Assembly Center (4,085); Ruston, LA
December 7, 2013*; 7:00 pm		Southern	W 69–50	7–2	Thomas Assembly Center (3,629); Ruston, LA
December 11, 2013*; 8:30 pm		Northwestern State	W 93–71	8–2	Thomas Assembly Center (3,547); Ruston, LA
December 14, 2013*; 1:00 pm, ESPNU		vs. No. 7 Oklahoma State; All-College Basketball Classic	L 55–70	8–3	Chesapeake Energy Arena (7,047); Oklahoma City, OK
December 17, 2013*; 6:30 pm		McNeese State	W 64–50	9–3	Thomas Assembly Center (2,962); Ruston, LA
December 22, 2013*; 5:00 pm		at Louisiana–Monroe	W 83–61	10–3	Fant–Ewing Coliseum (4,107); Monroe, LA
December 30, 2013*; 7:00 pm, SSTV		at Oklahoma	W 102–98 ^{OT}	11–3	Lloyd Noble Center (10,903); Norman, OK
January 4, 2014*; 4:00 pm		Longwood	W 126–52	12–3	Thomas Assembly Center (2,502); Ruston, LA
January 9, 2014; 6:30 pm		Florida Atlantic	W 84–64	13–3 (1–0)	Thomas Assembly Center (2,678); Ruston, LA
January 11, 2014; 7:40 pm		FIU	W 85–51	14–3 (2–0)	Thomas Assembly Center (4,236); Ruston, LA
January 16, 2014; 8:00 pm, CST		at Tulane	W 73–45	15–3 (3–0)	Devlin Fieldhouse (2,006); New Orleans, LA
January 19, 2014; 12:00 pm, FS1		at Southern Miss	L 71–80	15–4 (3–1)	Reed Green Coliseum (5,110); Hattiesburg, MS
January 23, 2014; 6:30 pm		Charlotte	W 80–60	16–4 (4–1)	Thomas Assembly Center (3,250); Ruston, LA
January 25, 2014; 7:00 pm, CBSSN		Marshall	W 98–77	17–4 (5–1)	Thomas Assembly Center (7,355); Ruston, LA
January 30, 2014; 8:05 pm		at UTEP	L 79–89	17–5 (5–2)	Don Haskins Center (8,361); El Paso, TX
February 1, 2014; 3:00 pm, TWCSCT		at UTSA	W 87–72	18–5 (6–2)	Convocation Center (1,104); San Antonio, TX
February 6, 2014; 8:00 pm, CBSSN		Tulsa	W 66–61	19–5 (7–2)	Thomas Assembly Center (4,935); Ruston, LA
February 8, 2014; 6:00 pm		North Texas	W 90–75	20–5 (8–2)	Thomas Assembly Center (5,123); Ruston, LA
February 15, 2014; 7:35 pm		Rice	W 85–46	21–5 (9–2)	Thomas Assembly Center (4,561); Ruston, LA
February 20, 2014; 6:00 pm		at East Carolina	L 68–75	21–6 (9–3)	Williams Arena (3,798); Greenville, NC
February 22, 2014; 6:00 pm		at Old Dominion	W 71–66	22–6 (10–3)	Constant Center (6,940); Norfolk, VA
February 27, 2014; 6:30 pm		Middle Tennessee	W 55–39	23–6 (11–3)	Thomas Assembly Center (5,349); Ruston, LA
March 2, 2014; 3:00 pm		at UAB	W 67–58	24–6 (12–3)	Bartow Arena (5,133); Birmingham, AL
March 6, 2014; 7:00 pm		at Rice	W 70–48	25–6 (13–3)	Tudor Fieldhouse (1,380); Houston, TX
Conference USA tournament
March 13, 2014; 9:30 pm		vs. Charlotte; Quarterfinals	W 86–65	26–6	Don Haskins Center (8,252); El Paso, TX
March 14, 2014; 6:05 pm, CBSSN		vs. Southern Miss; Semifinals	W 88–70	27–6	Don Haskins Center (5,611); El Paso, TX
March 15, 2014; 10:35 am, CBS		vs. Tulsa; Championship	L 60–69	27–7	Don Haskins Center (4,870); El Paso, TX
NIT
March 19, 2014*; 6:30 pm, ESPN3	No. (3)	(6) Iona; First round	W 89–88	28–7	Thomas Assembly Center (4,643); Ruston, LA
March 22, 2014*; 10:00 am, ESPN	No. (3)	at (2) Georgia; Second round	W 79–71	29–7	Stegeman Coliseum (3,692); Athens, GA
March 26, 2014*; 6:00 pm, ESPN2	No. (3)	at (1) Florida State; Quarterfinals	L 75–78	29–8	Donald L. Tucker Center (4,470); Tallahassee, FL
*Non-conference game. ^{#}Rankings from AP Poll, (#) during NIT is seed within region. (#) Tournament seedings in parentheses. All times are in Central Time.
