= 2013–14 Sam Houston State Bearkats men's basketball team =

American college basketball season

2013–14 Sam Houston State Bearkats men's basketball

CIT Second round vs. San Diego, L 72–77
- Conference: Southland Conference
- Record: 24–11 (13–5 Southland)
- Head coach: Jason Hooten (4th season)
- Assistant coaches: Chris Mudge (4th season); Matt Braeuer (1st season); Kenneth Mangrum (1st season)
- Home arena: Bernard Johnson Coliseum

2013–14 Southland Conference men's basketball standings
	Conf.				Overall
Team	W		L	PCT	W		L	PCT
Stephen F. Austin †	18	–	0	1.000	32	–	3	.914
Texas A&M–CC	14	–	4	.778	18	–	16	.529
Sam Houston State	13	–	5	.722	24	–	11	.686
Northwestern State	12	–	6	.667	17	–	14	.548
Incarnate Word*	9	–	5	.643	21	–	6	.778
Oral Roberts	10	–	8	.556	17	–	16	.515
Nicholls State	10	–	8	.556	14	–	15	.483
McNeese State	9	–	9	.500	11	–	20	.355
New Orleans**	8	–	10	.444	11	–	15	.423
Southeastern Louisiana	7	–	11	.389	12	–	18	.400
Central Arkansas	5	–	13	.278	8	–	21	.276
Lamar	3	–	15	.167	4	–	26	.133
Abilene Christian*	2	–	12	.143	11	–	20	.355
Houston Baptist	2	–	16	.111	6	–	25	.194
† 2014 Southland tournament winner Rankings from AP poll *ineligible for postseason play due to Div. I transition **ineligible for postseason play due to APR penalties

The 2013–14 Sam Houston State Bearkats men's basketball team represented Sam Houston State University during the 2013–14 NCAA Division I men's basketball season. The Bearkats, led by fourth year head coach Jason Hooten, played their home games at the Bernard Johnson Coliseum and were members of the Southland Conference. They finished the season 24–11, 13–5 in Southland play to finish in third place. They advanced to the championship game of the Southland Conference tournament where they lost to Stephen F. Austin. They were invited to the CollegeInsider.com Tournament where they defeated Alabama State in the first round before losing in the second round to San Diego.

== Roster ==
Number	Name	Position	Height	Weight	Year	Hometown
1	Jabari Peters	Guard	6–4	180	Junior	Brooklyn, New York
2	Marquel McKinney	Guard	6–3	206	Junior	Houston, Texas
5	Jesse Lopez	Forward	6–7	200	Freshman	El Paso, Texas
11	DeMarcus Gatlin	Guard	6–4	190	Senior	Houston, Texas
15	Kaheem Ransom	Guard	6–1	180	Junior	Wichita, Kansas
20	James Thomas	Forward	6–5	215	Senior	Duncanville, Texas
21	Paul Baxter	Guard	6–1	180	Sophomore	Austin, Texas
22	Mitch McCormick	Guard	6–1	180	Sophomore	Montgomery, Texas
24	Terrance Motley	Forward	6–7	240	Senior	Phoenix, Arizona
32	Will Bond	Guard	6–4	190	Senior	Phoenix, Arizona
33	Nathaniel Mason	Forward	6–4	185	Senior	Cincinnati, Ohio
34	Aurimas Majauskas	Forward	6–7	245	Freshman	Marijampolė, Lithuania
35	Michael Holyfield	Center	6–11	255	Junior	Albuquerque, New Mexico
44	Dakariai Henderson	Guard	6–2	170	Redshirt Freshman	Pearland, Texas
55	Brett Lincoln	Center	6–8	220	Junior	Dallas

== Schedule ==
Date time, TV	Opponent	Result	Record	Site (attendance) city, state
Regular season
11/08/2013*; 7:00 pm	at Texas-Pan American	W 77–73	1–0	UTPA Fieldhouse (1,257); Edinburg, Texas
11/11/2013*; 7:00 pm, BSN	Hillsdale Baptist	W 116–54	2–0	Bernard Johnson Coliseum (952); Huntsville, Texas
11/14/2013*; 7:00 pm	at Prairie View A&M	W 108–103	3–0	William Nicks Building (2,678); Prairie View, Texas
11/20/2013*; 7:00 pm, BSN	Jarvis Christian	W 98–48	4–0	Bernard Johnson Coliseum (944); Huntsville, Texas
11/24/2013*; 3:00 pm, ESPN3	at Texas A&M; Corpus Christi Challenge	L 62–79	4–1	Reed Arena (4,218); College Station, Texas
11/26/2013*; 7:00 pm, ESPN3	at SMU; Corpus Christi Challenge	L 53–72	4–2	Curtis Culwell Center (3,549); Garland, Texas
11/29/2013*; 3:30 pm	vs. Arkansas–Pine Bluff; Corpus Christi Challenge	W 75–49	5–2	American Bank Center (N/A); Corpus Christi, Texas
11/30/2013*; 2:35 pm	vs. Liberty; Corpus Christi Challenge	L 58–62	5–3	American Bank Center (N/A); Corpus Christi, Texas
12/06/2013*; 6:00 pm, Lumberjack TV	James Madison; SFA Invitational	W 77–76	6–3	William R. Johnson Coliseum (752); Nacogdoches, Texas
12/07/2013*; 5:30 pm, CSNH/ESPN3	Towson; SFA Invitational	W 67–55	7–3	William R. Johnson Coliseum (797); Nacogdoches, Texas
12/14/2013*; 1:00 pm	at Toledo	L 61–77	7–4	Savage Arena (3,602); Toledo, Ohio
12/28/2012*; 4:00 pm, BSN	LIU Brooklyn	W 82–78	8–4	Bernard Johnson Coliseum (682); Huntsville, Texas
01/02/2014; 7:30 pm	at Northwestern State	W 107–104 ^{2OT}	9–4 (1–0)	Prather Coliseum (1,221); Natchitoches, Louisiana
01/04/2014; 6:00 pm, Lumberjack TV	at Stephen F. Austin	L 56–73	9–5 (1–1)	William R. Johnson Coliseum (1,046); Nacogdoches, Texas
01/09/2014; 7:00 pm, BSN	McNeese State	W 86–81	10–5 (2–1)	Bernard Johnson Coliseum (721); Huntsville, Texas
01/11/2014; 4:00 pm, BSN	Nicholls State	W 88–61	11–5 (3–1)	Bernard Johnson Coliseum (909); Huntsville, Texas
01/16/2014; 7:30 pm	at Southeastern Louisiana	W 85–78	12–5 (4–1)	University Center (454); Hammond, Louisiana
01/18/2014; 6:30 pm	at New Orleans	W 77–70	13–5 (5–1)	Lakefront Arena (642); New Orleans, Louisiana
01/23/2014; 5:30 pm, CSNH	at Incarnate Word	W 85–74	13–6 (5–2)	McDermott Convocation Center (1,362); San Antonio, TX
01/25/2014; 3:00 pm, ESPN3	at Abilene Christian	W 70–51	14–6 (6–2)	Moody Coliseum (1,500); Abilene, Texas
01/30/2014; 7:45 pm, BSN	Texas A&M–Corpus Christi	W 78–74	15–6 (7–2)	Bernard Johnson Coliseum (1,531); Huntsville, Texas
02/01/2014; 4:00 pm, BSN	Houston Baptist	W 81–63	16–6 (8–2)	Bernard Johnson Coliseum (1,036); Huntsville, Texas
02/08/2014; 4:00 pm, BSN	Lamar	W 84–70	17–6 (9–2)	Bernard Johnson Coliseum (1,218); Huntsville, Texas
02/13/2014; 7:45 pm, BSN	Northwestern State	W 67–64	18–6 (10–2)	Bernard Johnson Coliseum (1,357); Huntsville, Texas
02/15/2014; 4:00 pm, ESPN3	Stephen F. Austin	L 60–67	18–7 (10–3)	Bernard Johnson Coliseum (1,884); Huntsville, Texas
02/22/2014; 6:00 pm	at Lamar	W 74–71	19–7 (11–3)	Montagne Center (2,340); Beaumont, Texas
02/27/2014; 7:00 pm	at Central Arkansas	L 71–80	19–8 (11–4)	Farris Center (1,378); Conway, Arkansas
03/01/2014; 7:00 pm, FCS	at Oral Roberts	L 73–80	19–9 (11–5)	Mabee Center (6,431); Tulsa, Oklahoma
03/06/2014; 7:45 pm, BSN	Southeastern Louisiana	W 71–54	20–9 (12–5)	Bernard Johnson Coliseum (1,187); Huntsville, Texas
03/08/2014; 4:00 pm, BSN	New Orleans	W 80–61	21–9 (13–5)	Bernard Johnson Coliseum (1,694); Huntsville, Texas
Southland tournament
03/13/2014; 7:30 pm	vs. Oral Roberts; Quarterfinals	W 70–61	22–9	Merrell Center (1,213); Katy, Texas
03/14/2014; 7:30 pm	vs. Texas A&M–Corpus Christi; Semifinals	W 69–63	23–9	Merrell Center (3,071); Katy, Texas
03/15/2014; 7:30 pm, ESPN2	vs. Stephen F. Austin; Championship	L 49–68	23–10	Merrell Center (3,740); Katy, Texas
CIT
03/18/2014*; 7:00 pm	Alabama State; First round	W 71–49	24–10	Bernard Johnson Coliseum (474); Huntsville, Texas
03/22/2014*; 7:00 pm	San Diego; Second round	L 72–77	24–11	Bernard Johnson Coliseum (597); Huntsville, Texas
*Non-conference game. (#) Tournament seedings in parentheses. All times are in Central Time.
