= 2013–14 McNeese State Cowboys basketball team =

American college basketball season

2013–14 McNeese State Cowboys basketball
- Conference: Southland Conference
- Record: 11–20 (9–9 Southland)
- Head coach: Dave Simmons (8th season)
- Assistant coaches: David Dumars; Steve Welch; Patrick Haynes
- Home arena: Burton Coliseum; Sudduth Coliseum

2013–14 Southland Conference men's basketball standings
	Conf.				Overall
Team	W		L	PCT	W		L	PCT
Stephen F. Austin †	18	–	0	1.000	32	–	3	.914
Texas A&M–CC	14	–	4	.778	18	–	16	.529
Sam Houston State	13	–	5	.722	24	–	11	.686
Northwestern State	12	–	6	.667	17	–	14	.548
Incarnate Word*	9	–	5	.643	21	–	6	.778
Oral Roberts	10	–	8	.556	17	–	16	.515
Nicholls State	10	–	8	.556	14	–	15	.483
McNeese State	9	–	9	.500	11	–	20	.355
New Orleans**	8	–	10	.444	11	–	15	.423
Southeastern Louisiana	7	–	11	.389	12	–	18	.400
Central Arkansas	5	–	13	.278	8	–	21	.276
Lamar	3	–	15	.167	4	–	26	.133
Abilene Christian*	2	–	12	.143	11	–	20	.355
Houston Baptist	2	–	16	.111	6	–	25	.194
† 2014 Southland tournament winner Rankings from AP poll *ineligible for postseason play due to Div. I transition **ineligible for postseason play due to APR penalties

The 2013–14 McNeese State Cowboys basketball team represented McNeese State University during the 2013–14 NCAA Division I men's basketball season. The Cowboys were led by eighth-year head coach Dave Simmons and played their home games at Burton Coliseum, with three home games at Sudduth Coliseum. They were members of the Southland Conference. They finished the season 11–20, 9–9 in Southland play to finish in eighth place. They lost in the first round of the Southland Conference tournament to Oral Roberts.

== Roster ==
Number	Name	Position	Height	Weight	Year	Hometown
0	Shaun Johnson	Guard	5–10	178	Sophomore	Pineville, Louisiana
3	Keelan Garrett	Guard	6–0	180	Senior	Lake Charles, Louisiana
10	Craig McFerrin	Post	6–7	230	Junior	Baton Rouge, Louisiana
11	Kevin Hardy	Guard	6–2	180	Junior	Lake Charles, Louisiana
12	Josh Jagneaux	Guard	6–1	170	Sophomore	Bell City, Louisiana
13	Jordan Wells	Forward	6–7	250	Sophomore	Orange, Texas
20	Adrian Fields	Forward	6–5	197	Senior	Opelousas, Louisiana
23	Brandon Regis	Guard/Forward	6–3	196	Junior	Dallas, TX
32	Desharick Guidry	Forward	6–5	200	Junior	Lake Charles, Louisiana
44	Austin Lewis	Forward	6–8	215	Sophomore	Houston, Texas
54	Pete Kpan	Forward	6–7	235	Senior	Columbus, Ohio
	Matthew Moss	Center	6–9	212	Sophomore	Anacoco, Louisiana

== Schedule ==
Date time, TV	Opponent	Result	Record	Site (attendance) city, state
Regular season
11/08/2013*; 6:00 pm	at No. 2 Michigan State	L 56–98	0–1	Breslin Student Events Center (14,797); East Lansing, MI
11/12/2013*; 7:05 pm	at Louisiana–Lafayette	L 66–92	0–2	Cajundome (3,071); Lafayette, LA
11/15/2013*; 7:00 pm	Louisiana College	W 92–83	1–2	Burton Coliseum (758); Lake Charles, LA
11/18/2013*; 4:30 pm	at Georgia State; NIT Season Tip-Off	L 70–96	1–3	Tuscaloosa, AL (9,903); Coleman Coliseum
11/19/2013*; 4:30 pm	vs. Stillman; NIT Season Tip-Off	W 81–72	2–3	Tuscaloosa, AL (9,527); Coleman Coliseum
11/25/2013*; 4:00 pm	vs. East Carolina; NIT Season Tip-Off	L 62–91	2–4	Ryan Center (869); Kingston, RI
11/26/2013*; 6:30 pm	at Rhode Island; NIT Season Tip-Off	L 71–76	2–5	Ryan Center (858); Kingston, RI
12/02/2013*; 7:30 pm, ESPN3	at SMU	L 59–88	2–6	Moody Coliseum (3,252); University Park, TX
12/14/2013*; 7:00 pm, FSSW	at Texas A&M	L 60–73	2–7	Reed Arena (4,392); College Station, TX
12/17/2013*; 6:30 pm	at Louisiana Tech	L 50–64	2–8	Thomas Assembly Center (2,962); Ruston, LA
12/21/2013*; 9:00 pm, 4SD	at No. 24 San Diego State	L 36–65	2–9	Viejas Arena (12,414); San Diego, CA
12/28/2013*; 7:00 pm, CST	at LSU	W 79–52	2–10	Pete Maravich Assembly Center (8,796); Baton Rouge, LA
01/02/2014; 7:30 pm	Southeastern Louisiana	W 69–60	3–10 (1–0)	Burton Coliseum (1,063); Lake Charles, LA
01/04/2014; 3:00 pm	New Orleans	W 82–69	4–10 (2–0)	Burton Coliseum (729); Lake Charles, LA
01/09/2014; 7:45 pm	at Sam Houston State	L 81–86	4–11 (2–1)	Bernard Johnson Coliseum (721); Huntsville, TX
01/11/2014; 6:00 pm	at Lamar	W 74–59	5–11 (3–1)	Montagne Center (2,090); Beaumont, TX
01/16/2014; 7:30 pm	Texas A&M–Corpus Christi	L 61–77	5–12 (3–2)	Burton Coliseum (721); Lake Charles, LA
01/18/2014; 3:00 pm, ESPN3	Houston Baptist	W 70–68	6–12 (4–2)	Burton Coliseum (1,447); Lake Charles, LA
01/21/2014; 7:30 pm, CSNH	Nicholls State	L 79–87 ^{OT}	6–13 (4–3)	Sudduth Coliseum (1,126); Lake Charles, LA
01/30/2014; 7:30 pm	Central Arkansas	L 75–76	6–14 (4–4)	Sudduth Coliseum (1,307); Lake Charles, LA
02/01/2014; 3:00 pm	Oral Roberts	W 79–68	7–14 (5–4)	Sudduth Coliseum (1,312); Lake Charles, LA
02/06/2014; 7:30 pm, ESPN3	Northwestern State	L 74–85	7–15 (5–5)	Prather Coliseum (N/A); Natchitoches, LA
02/08/2014; 6:00 pm	at Stephen F. Austin	L 54–74	7–16 (5–6)	William R. Johnson Coliseum (3,275); Nacogdoches, TX
02/13/2014; 7:30 pm	at Southeastern Louisiana	L 53–62	7–17 (5–7)	University Center (785); Hammond, LA
02/16/2014; 4:15 pm	at New Orleans	W 72–69	8–17 (6–7)	Lakefront Arena (748); New Orleans, LA
02/22/2014; 3:30 pm	at Nicholls State	L 59–68	8–18 (6–8)	Stopher Gym (545); Thibodaux, LA
02/27/2014; 7:30 pm	Incarnate Word	W 87–72	9–18 (7–8)	Burton Coliseum (873); Lake Charles, LA
03/01/2014; 3:00 pm	Abilene Christian	W 95–91 ^{OT}	10–18 (8–8)	Burton Coliseum (872); Lake Charles, LA
03/06/2014; 7:30 pm	at Texas A&M–Corpus Christi	L 51–67	10–19 (8–9)	American Bank Center (1,233); Corpus Christi, TX
03/08/2014; 7:30 pm	at Houston Baptist	W 79–77	11–19 (9–9)	Sharp Gymnasium (913); Houston, TX
Southland tournament
03/12/2014; 7:30 pm	vs. Oral Roberts; First round	L 62–66	11–20	Merrell Center (1,009); Katy, TX
*Non-conference game. ^{#}Rankings from AP Poll. (#) Tournament seedings in parentheses. All times are in Central Time.
