= 2013–14 Central Arkansas Bears basketball team =

American college basketball season

2013–14 Central Arkansas Bears basketball
- Conference: Southland Conference
- Record: 8–21 (5–13 Southland)
- Head coach: Clarence Finley (1st- interim season)
- Assistant coaches: Keith Richardson Jr.; Chris Sartorius
- Home arena: Farris Center

2013–14 Southland Conference men's basketball standings
| | Conf. | | | | Overall |
| Team | W | | L | PCT | W | | L | PCT |
|---|---|---|---|---|---|---|---|---|
| Stephen F. Austin † | 18 | – | 0 | 1.000 | 32 | – | 3 | .914 |
| Texas A&M–CC | 14 | – | 4 | .778 | 18 | – | 16 | .529 |
| Sam Houston State | 13 | – | 5 | .722 | 24 | – | 11 | .686 |
| Northwestern State | 12 | – | 6 | .667 | 17 | – | 14 | .548 |
| Incarnate Word* | 9 | – | 5 | .643 | 21 | – | 6 | .778 |
| Oral Roberts | 10 | – | 8 | .556 | 17 | – | 16 | .515 |
| Nicholls State | 10 | – | 8 | .556 | 14 | – | 15 | .483 |
| McNeese State | 9 | – | 9 | .500 | 11 | – | 20 | .355 |
| New Orleans** | 8 | – | 10 | .444 | 11 | – | 15 | .423 |
| Southeastern Louisiana | 7 | – | 11 | .389 | 12 | – | 18 | .400 |
| Central Arkansas | 5 | – | 13 | .278 | 8 | – | 21 | .276 |
| Lamar | 3 | – | 15 | .167 | 4 | – | 26 | .133 |
| Abilene Christian* | 2 | – | 12 | .143 | 11 | – | 20 | .355 |
| Houston Baptist | 2 | – | 16 | .111 | 6 | – | 25 | .194 |
† 2014 Southland tournament winner Rankings from AP poll *ineligible for postseason play due to Div. I transition **ineligible for postseason play due to APR penalties

The 2013–14 Central Arkansas Bears basketball team represented the University of Central Arkansas during the 2013–14 NCAA Division I men's basketball season. The Bears are led by interim head coach Clarence Finley and played their home games at the Farris Center. They were members of the Southland Conference. They finished the season 8–21, 5–13 in Southland play to finish in 11th place. They failed to qualify for the Southland Conference tournament.

On March 5, it was announced that UCA alumni Russ Pennell was announced as the team's new head coach for the following season.

== Roster ==
| Number | Name | Position | Height | Weight | Year | Hometown |
|---|---|---|---|---|---|---|
| 0 | Ethan Lee | Forward | 6– | | Freshman | Camden, Arkansas |
| 1 | DeShone McClure | Guard | 6–3 | 175 | Senior | Jacksonville, Arkansas |
| 2 | LaQuentin Miles | Guard | 6–5 | 190 | Senior | Jacksonville, Arkansas |
| 4 | Jalen Jackson | Forward | 6–6 | | Freshman | West Memphis, Arkansas |
| 5 | Ryan Williams | Guard | 6–3 | 185 | Senior | Pine Bluff, Arkansas |
| 10 | Phabian Glasco | Forward | 6–7 | | Freshman | Tulsa, Oklahoma |
| 11 | Oliver Wells | Guard | 6–0 | 185 | Junior | Cedar Hill, Texas |
| 12 | Taylor Johnson | Guard | 6–2 | 170 | Freshman | Flower Mound, Texas |
| 13 | Lenell Brown | Guard | 5–11 | 155 | Junior | Pine Bluff, Arkansas |
| 15 | Terry Tidwell | Center | 6–8 | 230 | Senior | Conway, Arkansas |
| 20 | Jaylen Waller | Guard | 5–7 | 145 | Freshman | Little Rock, Arkansas |
| 21 | Sean Young | Center | 6–9 | 200 | Sophomore | Bixby, Oklahoma |
| 24 | Chasen Williamson | Guard | 6–0 | | Freshman | Fayetteville, Arkansas |
| 30 | DuShaun Rice | Guard | 6–0 | 165 | Freshman | Fort Smith, Arkansas |
| 32 | Tirrell Brown | Forward | 6–5 | 235 | Sophomore | Jacksonville, Arkansas |
| 33 | Jeff Drew | Forward | 6–7 | 215 | Sophomore | Little Rock, Arkansas |
| 35 | Daouda Berete | Guard | 6–4 | 175 | Sophomore | Conakry, Guinea |
| | Aubrey Ball | Guard | 6–3 | 185 | Junior | Carrollton, Texas |

== Schedule ==
| Date time, TV | Opponent | Result | Record | Site (attendance) city, state |
Regular season
| 11/12/2013*; 7:00 pm | Hendrix | W 109–59 | 1–0 | Farris Center (1,527); Conway, AR |
| 11/16/2013*; 7:00 pm | at SIU Edwardsville | L 93–100 | 1–1 | Vadalabene Center (1,535); Edwardsville, IL |
| 11/20/2013*; 7:00 pm | Louisiana Tech | L 57–94 | 1–2 | Farris Center (1,547); Conway, AR |
| 11/24/2013*; 2:05 pm | at Arkansas State | L 56–99 | 1–3 | Convocation Center (1,917); Jonesboro, AR |
| 11/26/2013*; 7:00 pm | Troy | W 60–53 | 2–3 | Farris Center (746); Conway, AR |
| 12/01/2013*; 3:00 pm, FCS | at Kansas State | L 54–87 | 2–4 | Bramlage Coliseum (11,651); Manhattan, KS |
| 12/07/2013*; 12:00 pm | Nebraska–Omaha | L 88–104 | 2–5 | Farris Center (423); Conway, AR |
| 12/15/2013*; 7:00 pm | at Texas Tech | L 54–79 | 2–6 | United Spirit Arena (4,894); Lubbock, TX |
| 12/17/2013*; 11:30 am | at North Texas | L 55–64 | 2–7 | The Super Pit (3,664); Denton, TX |
| 12/21/2013*; 12:00 pm | Charleston Southern | L 90–97 ^{2OT} | 2–8 | Farris Center (557); Conway, AR |
| 12/30/2013*; 4:30 pm | Ecclesia | W 121–77 | 3–8 | Farris Center (483); Conway, AR |
| 01/02/2014; 7:00 pm | Texas A&M–Corpus Christi | L 66–81 | 3–9 (0–1) | Farris Center (610); Conway, AR |
| 01/04/2014; 4:00 pm | Houston Baptist | W 86–69 | 4–9 (1–1) | Farris Center (612); Conway, AR |
| 01/11/2014; 6:00 pm | at Oral Roberts | L 80–93 | 4–10 (1–2) | Mabee Center (3,923); Tulsa, OK |
| 01/16/2014; 7:30 pm | at Incarnate Word | L 72–87 | 4–11 (1–3) | McDermott Convocation Center (1,386); San Antonio, TX |
| 01/18/2014; 3:00 pm | at Abilene Christian | L 72–73 | 4–12 (1–4) | Moody Coliseum (422); Abilene, TX |
| 01/23/2014; 7:00 pm | Northwestern State | L 68–76 | 4–13 (1–5) | Farris Center (1,012); Conway, AR |
| 01/25/2014; 4:00 pm | Stephen F. Austin | L 49–64 | 4–14 (1–6) | Farris Center (1,242); Conway, AR |
| 01/30/2014; 7:30 pm | at McNeese State | W 76–75 | 5–14 (2–6) | Burton Coliseum (1,307); Lake Charles, LA |
| 02/01/2014; 3:30 pm | at Nicholls State | L 67–78 | 5–15 (2–7) | Stopher Gym (527); Thibodaux, LA |
| 02/06/2014; 7:00 pm | Southeastern Louisiana | W 85–71 | 6–15 (3–7) | Farris Center (922); Conway, AR |
| 02/08/2014; 4:00 pm, ESPN3 | New Orleans | L 79–88 | 6–16 (3–8) | Farris Center (1,646); Conway, AR |
| 02/13/2014; 7:30 pm | at Texas A&M–Corpus Christi | L 73–84 | 6–17 (3–9) | American Bank Center (1,721); Corpus Christi, TX |
| 02/15/2014; 7:30 pm | at Houston Baptist | L 83–99 | 6–18 (3–10) | Sharp Gymnasium (714); Houston, TX |
| 02/22/2014; 4:00 pm | Oral Roberts | L 50–63 | 6–19 (3–11) | Farris Center (575); Conway, AR |
| 02/27/2014; 7:00 pm | Sam Houston State | W 80–71 | 7–19 (4–11) | Farris Center (1,378); Conway, AR |
| 03/01/2014; 4:00 pm | Lamar | W 76–69 | 8–19 (5–11) | Farris Center (1,044); Conway, AR |
| 03/06/2014; 7:30 pm | at Northwestern State | L 102–119 | 8–20 (5–12) | Prather Coliseum (2,312); Natchitoches, LA |
| 03/08/2014; 6:00 pm | at Stephen F. Austin | L 61–85 | 8–21 (5–13) | William R. Johnson Coliseum (5,481); Nacogdoches, TX |
*Non-conference game. ^{#}Rankings from AP Poll. (#) Tournament seedings in parentheses. All times are in Central Time.
