= 2013–14 Texas A&M–Corpus Christi Islanders men's basketball team =

American college basketball season

2013–14 Texas A&M–Corpus Christi Islanders men's basketball

CIT Second round vs. Pacific, L 60–89
- Conference: Southland Conference
- Record: 18–16 (14–4 Southland)
- Head coach: Willis Wilson (3rd season)
- Assistant coaches: Marty Gross; Mark Dannhoff; Yaphett King
- Home arena: American Bank Center; Dugan Wellness Center

2013–14 Southland Conference men's basketball standings
	Conf.				Overall
Team	W		L	PCT	W		L	PCT
Stephen F. Austin †	18	–	0	1.000	32	–	3	.914
Texas A&M–CC	14	–	4	.778	18	–	16	.529
Sam Houston State	13	–	5	.722	24	–	11	.686
Northwestern State	12	–	6	.667	17	–	14	.548
Incarnate Word*	9	–	5	.643	21	–	6	.778
Oral Roberts	10	–	8	.556	17	–	16	.515
Nicholls State	10	–	8	.556	14	–	15	.483
McNeese State	9	–	9	.500	11	–	20	.355
New Orleans**	8	–	10	.444	11	–	15	.423
Southeastern Louisiana	7	–	11	.389	12	–	18	.400
Central Arkansas	5	–	13	.278	8	–	21	.276
Lamar	3	–	15	.167	4	–	26	.133
Abilene Christian*	2	–	12	.143	11	–	20	.355
Houston Baptist	2	–	16	.111	6	–	25	.194
† 2014 Southland tournament winner Rankings from AP poll *ineligible for postseason play due to Div. I transition **ineligible for postseason play due to APR penalties

The 2013–14 Texas A&M–Corpus Christi Islanders men's basketball team represented Texas A&M University–Corpus Christi in the 2013–14 NCAA Division I men's basketball season. This was head coach Willis Wilson's third season at Texas A&M–Corpus Christi. The Islanders were members of the Southland Conference and played their home games at the American Bank Center and the Dugan Wellness Center. They finished the season 18–16, 14–4 in Southland play to finish in second place. They lost in the semifinals of the Southland Conference tournament to Sam Houston State. They were invited to the CollegeInsider.com Tournament where they defeated Northern Colorado in the first round before losing in the second round to Pacific.

== Media ==
Texas A&M–Corpus Christi men's basketball airs on KKTX with Steven King on the call all season long. Video streaming of all non-televised home games is available at GoIslanders.com.

== Roster ==
2013–14 Texas A&M–Corpus Christi Islanders men's basketball team
Players
Coaches

Pos.	#	Name	Height	Weight	Year	Previous school	Hometown
G	0	Brandon Pye	6 ft 0 in (1.83 m)	175 lb (79 kg)	So	Timberview	Mansfield, TX
G	1	Hameed Ali	6 ft 2 in (1.88 m)	170 lb (77 kg)	Jr	San Leandro	Hayward, CA
G	2	Cole Martinez	6 ft 2 in (1.88 m)	190 lb (86 kg)	So	Air Force Academy Prep	San Antonio, TX
F	3	Zane Knowles	6 ft 10 in (2.08 m)	240 lb (109 kg)	Sr	Champagnat Catholic; Pearl River CC	Nassau, Bahamas
G	4	Marcus Ellison	6 ft 1 in (1.85 m)	165 lb (75 kg)	Fr	Carroll	Corpus Christi, TX
G	10	Johnathan Jordan	5 ft 10 in (1.78 m)	180 lb (82 kg)	Jr	Hightower	Houston, TX
G	11	Jelani Currie	6 ft 4 in (1.93 m)	180 lb (82 kg)	So	Albany Academy	Albany, NY
G	12	Jake Kocher	6 ft 3 in (1.91 m)	180 lb (82 kg)	RS So	St. Michael's	Austin, TX
G	14	Emmanuel Toney	6 ft 3 in (1.91 m)	175 lb (79 kg)	Fr	Annapolis Area Christian	Annapolis, MD
F	23	Bryce Douvier	6 ft 7 in (2.01 m)	230 lb (104 kg)	Jr	Sedgwick; Northern Colorado	Sedgwick, KS
F	25	Rashawn Thomas	6 ft 7 in (2.01 m)	245 lb (111 kg)	Fr	Southeast	Oklahoma City, OK
F	30	Jeff Beverly	6 ft 6 in (1.98 m)	245 lb (111 kg)	Fr	Clear Springs	Houston, TX
G/F	31	Joy Williamson	6 ft 3 in (1.91 m)	205 lb (93 kg)	Sr	Putnam City North redlands CC	Oklahoma City, OK
G	32	James King	6 ft 0 in (1.83 m)	190 lb (86 kg)	So	Steele	Schertz, TX
F	34	Dale Francis	6 ft 8 in (2.03 m)	230 lb (104 kg)	So	Canarias Basketball Academy	Leighton Buzzard, England

Head coach

- Willis Wilson (Rice)

Assistant coach(es)

- Marty Gross (Jacksonville)
- Mark Dannhoff (UW–La Crosse)
- Yaphett King (Cal State Fullerton)

Legend

- (C) Team captain
- (S) Suspended
- (I) Ineligible
- (W) Walk-on
- Injured
- Current redshirt

== Schedule and results ==
Date time, TV	Opponent	Result	Record	Site (attendance) city, state
Exhibition
08/22/2013*; 2:00 pm	at Nelson Soma All-Stars	W 108–45		Mediolanum Forum (N/A); Milan, Italy
08/24/2013*; 11:30 am	at Oleggio Basket	W 93–53		Piazzale Olympic 2 (N/A); Oleggio, Italy
08/28/2013*	at Latina Basket	L 96–103		Pala Bianchini (N/A); Latina, Italy
08/29/2013*	at Stella Azzurra	W 80–50		Altero Felici Arena (N/A); Rome, Italy
Regular season
11/08/2013*; 7:00 pm	Huston–Tillotson; Islanders Classic	W 79–45	1–0	American Bank Center (802); Corpus Christi, TX
11/12/2013*; 7:00 pm, Cyclones.tv	at Iowa State	L 50–80	1–1	Hilton Coliseum (N/A); Ames, IA
11/15/2013*; 7:30 pm	IPFW; Islanders Classic	W 72–71	2–1	American Bank Center (N/A); Corpus Christi, TX
11/16/2013*; 5:30 pm	Tennessee Tech; Islanders Classic	W 62–60	2–2	American Bank Center (N/A); Corpus Christi, TX
11/17/2013*; 3:30 pm	Texas-Pan America; Islanders Classic	W 72–61	3–2	American Bank Center (N/A); Corpus Christi, TX
11/20/2013*; 7:00 pm	Rice	L 61–63	3–3	American Bank Center (1,006); Corpus Christi, TX
11/23/2013*; 2:00 pm	at UTSA	L 76–87	3–4	Convocation Center (815); San Antonio, TX
11/26/2013*; 7:00 pm	Central Michigan	L 64–68	3–5	American Bank Center (1,081); Corpus Christi, TX
11/30/2013*; 7:00 pm, ESPN3	at Houston	L 67–78	3–6	Hofheinz Pavilion (3,015); Houston, TX
12/05/2013*; 7:00 pm, FSSW or FSSW+	at Oklahoma	L 56–78	3–7	Lloyd Noble Center (2,300); Norman, OK
12/08/2013*; 4:30 pm	UT Permian Basin	L 77–82	3–8	American Bank Center (1,348); Corpus Christi, TX
12/20/2013*; 7:00 pm	Cal State Northridge	L 66–67	3–9	Dugan Wellness Center (531); Corpus Christi, TX
12/28/2013*; 7:30 pm, BTN	at Minnesota	L 44–65	3–10	Williams Arena (11,855); Minneapolis, MN
01/02/2014; 7:30 pm	at Central Arkansas	W 81–66	4–10 (1–0)	Farris Center (610); Conway, AR
01/04/2014; 6:00 pm, FCS	at Oral Roberts	W 71–64	5–10 (2–0)	Mabee Center (3,524); Tulsa, OK
01/09/2014; 7:30 pm	Northwestern State	W 101–87	6–10 (3–0)	American Bank Center (1,220); Corpus Christi, TX
01/11/2014; 6:30 pm	Stephen F. Austin	L 70–80	6–11 (3–1)	American Bank Center (1,295); Corpus Christi, TX
01/16/2014; 7:30 pm	at McNeese State	W 77–61	7–11 (4–1)	Burton Coliseum (721); Lake Charles, LA
01/18/2014; 3:30 pm	at Nicholls State	W 70–67	8–11 (5–1)	Stopher Gym (547); Thibodaux, LA
01/23/2014; 7:30 pm	Southeastern Louisiana	W 74–71	9–11 (6–1)	Dugan Wellness Center (N/A); Corpus Christi, TX
01/25/2014; 6:30 pm	New Orleans	W 70–62	9–12 (6–2)	American Bank Center (1,810); Corpus Christi, TX
01/30/2014; 7:45 pm	at Sam Houston State	L 74–78	9–13 (6–3)	Bernard Johnson Coliseum (1,531); Huntsville, TX
02/01/2014; 6:30 pm, ESPN3	at Lamar	W 58–35	10–13 (7–3)	Montagne Center (2,179); Beaumont, TX
02/06/2014; 7:30 pm	at Incarnate Word	L 78–82	10–14 (7–4)	McDermott Convocation Center (789); San Antonio, TX
02/08/2014; 3:30 pm	at Abilene Christian	W 71–69	11–14 (8–4)	Moody Coliseum (1,102); Abilene, TX
02/13/2014; 7:30 pm	Central Arkansas	W 84–73	12–14 (9–4)	American Bank Center (1,721); Corpus Christi, TX
02/15/2014; 3:30 pm, CSNH	Oral Roberts	W 74–72 ^{OT}	13–14 (10–4)	American Bank Center (1,255); Corpus Christi, TX
02/22/2014; 7:30 pm	at Houston Baptist	W 66–61	14–14 (11–4)	Sharp Gymnasium (870); Houston, TX
03/01/2014; 7:00 pm	Houston Baptist	W 65–45	15–14 (12–4)	American Bank Center (2,152); Corpus Christi, TX
03/06/2014; 7:30 pm	McNeese State	W 67–51	16–14 (13–4)	American Bank Center (1,233); Corpus Christi, TX
03/08/2014; 2:30 pm	Nicholls State	W 58–44	17–14 (14–4)	American Bank Center (1,236); Corpus Christi, TX
Southland tournament
03/14/2014; 7:30 pm, ESPN3	vs. Sam Houston State; Semifinals	L 63–69	17–15	Merrell Center (3,071); Katy, TX
CIT
03/19/2014*; 8:00 pm	at Northern Colorado; First round	W 82–71	18–15	Butler–Hancock Sports Pavilion (953); Greeley, CO
03/22/2014*; 8:00 pm	at Pacific; Second round	L 60–89	18–16	Alex G. Spanos Center (518); Stockton, CA
*Non-conference game. (#) Tournament seedings in parentheses.
