= 2013–14 Nicholls State Colonels men's basketball team =

American college basketball season

2013–14 Nicholls State Colonels men's basketball
- Conference: Southland Conference
- Record: 14–15 (10–8 Southland)
- Head coach: J. P. Piper (10th season)
- Assistant coaches: Rennie Bailey; Liam Tribe-Simmons
- Home arena: Stopher Gym

2013–14 Southland Conference men's basketball standings
	Conf.				Overall
Team	W		L	PCT	W		L	PCT
Stephen F. Austin †	18	–	0	1.000	32	–	3	.914
Texas A&M–CC	14	–	4	.778	18	–	16	.529
Sam Houston State	13	–	5	.722	24	–	11	.686
Northwestern State	12	–	6	.667	17	–	14	.548
Incarnate Word*	9	–	5	.643	21	–	6	.778
Oral Roberts	10	–	8	.556	17	–	16	.515
Nicholls State	10	–	8	.556	14	–	15	.483
McNeese State	9	–	9	.500	11	–	20	.355
New Orleans**	8	–	10	.444	11	–	15	.423
Southeastern Louisiana	7	–	11	.389	12	–	18	.400
Central Arkansas	5	–	13	.278	8	–	21	.276
Lamar	3	–	15	.167	4	–	26	.133
Abilene Christian*	2	–	12	.143	11	–	20	.355
Houston Baptist	2	–	16	.111	6	–	25	.194
† 2014 Southland tournament winner Rankings from AP poll *ineligible for postseason play due to Div. I transition **ineligible for postseason play due to APR penalties

The 2013–14 Nicholls State Colonels men's basketball team represented Nicholls State University during the 2013–14 NCAA Division I men's basketball season. The Colonels, led by tenth year head coach J. P. Piper, played their home games at Stopher Gym and were members of the Southland Conference. They finished the season 14–15, 10–8 in Southland play to finish in a tie for sixth place. They advanced to the quarterfinals of the Southland Conference tournament where they lost to Northwestern State.

== Roster ==
Number	Name	Position	Height	Weight	Year	Hometown
1	Dantrell Thomas	Guard	6–2	200	Senior	Many, Louisiana
2	Lachlan Prest	Forward	6–7	209	Redshirt Sophomore	Flagstaff Hill, Australia
3	J'Aaron Thorne	Guard	5–7	175	Freshman	Missouri City, Texas
4	Jeremy Smith	Guard	6–3	175	Redshirt Senior	New Orleans, Louisiana
5	Amin Torres	Guard	6–1	175	Sophomore	New Orleans, Louisiana
10	Pedro Maciel	Guard	6–1	180	Redshirt Senior	São Paulo, Brazil
11	Piers Carroll	Forward	6–6	200	Redshirt Freshman	Sydney, Australia
12	Alex Overs	Guard	6–4	200	Sophomore	Sydney, Australia
13	Travis Julien	Forward	6–7	190	Redshirt Sophomore	Vacherie, Louisiana
14	Ja'Dante Frye	Forward	6–4	180	Redshirt Freshman	Thibodaux, Louisiana
15	Sam McBeath	Forward	6–7	190	Redshirt Sophomore	Sydney, Australia
20	Cade Towers	Forward	6–9	225	Freshman	Queensland, Australia
21	Shane Rillieux	Guard	6–2	190	Junior	New Orleans, Louisiana
22	T.J. Carpenter	Guard	6–4	200	Sophomore	Sibley, Louisiana
23	Drew Caillouet	Forward	6–5	180	Redshirt Freshman	Thibodaux, Louisiana
24	Liam Thomas	Forward	6–10	195	Freshman	Sydney, Australia
32	JaMarkus Horace	Forward	6–6	180	Sophomore	Sugarland, Texas
33	Luke Doyle	Guard	6–5	190	Freshman	Oviedo, Florida

== Schedule ==
Date time, TV	Opponent	Result	Record	Site (attendance) city, state
Exhibition
11/02/2013*; 3:30 pm	Mobile	W 72–64		Stopher Gym (N/A); Thibodaux, LA
Regular season
11/08/2013*; 7:00 pm	at Auburn	L 54–76	0–1	Auburn Arena (4,196); Auburn, AL
11/14/2013*; 7:00 pm	at North Texas	L 78–92	0–2	The Super Pit (2,146); Denton, TX
11/19/2013*; 7:00 pm	at Troy	L 62–77	0–3	Trojan Arena (1,096); Troy, AL
11/23/2013*; 5:00 pm, ESPN3	at No. 11 Memphis	L 59–98	0–4	FedExForum (15,528); Memphis, TN
11/26/2013*; 6:30 pm	UTSA	W 79–73	1–4	Stopher Gym (296); Thibodaux, LA
12/07/2013*; 3:30 pm	Loyola (New Orleans)	W 87–62	2–4	Stopher Gym (426); Thibodaux, LA
12/14/2013*; 9:00 pm	at San Francisco	L 48–77	2–5	War Memorial Gymnasium (1,398); San Francisco, CA
12/18/2013*; 6:30 pm	at IUPUI	W 62–56	3–5	IUPUI Gymnasium (653); Indianapolis, IN
12/20/2013*; 6:00 pm	at Indiana	L 66–79	3–6	Assembly Hall (16,646); Bloomington, IN
01/02/2014; 7:30 pm	New Orleans	W 88–83	4–6 (1–0)	Stopher Gym (842); Thibodaux, LA
01/04/2014; 3:30 pm	Southeastern Louisiana	W 64–61	5–6 (2–0)	Stopher Gym (528); Thibodaux, LA
01/09/2014; 7:30 pm	at Lamar	W 64–60	6–6 (3–0)	Montagne Center (1,882); Beaumont, TX
01/11/2014; 4:00 pm	at Sam Houston State	L 61–88	6–7 (3–1)	Bernard Johnson Coliseum (909); Huntsville, TX
01/16/2014; 7:30 pm	Houston Baptist	W 66–64	7–7 (4–1)	Stopher Gym (542); Thibodaux, LA
01/18/2014; 3:30 pm	Texas A&M–Corpus Christi	L 67–70	7–8 (4–2)	Stopher Gym (547); Thibodaux, LA
01/21/2014; 8:00 pm, CSNH	at McNeese State	W 87–79 ^{OT}	8–8 (5–2)	Sudduth Coliseum (1,126); Lake Charles, LA
01/30/2014; 7:30 pm, ESPN3	Oral Roberts	W 73–72	9–8 (6–2)	Stopher Gym (1,178); Thibodaux, LA
02/01/2014; 3:30 pm	Central Arkansas	W 78–67	10–8 (7–2)	Stopher Gym (527); Thibodaux, LA
02/06/2014; 8:00 pm	at Stephen F. Austin	L 64–93	10–9 (7–3)	William R. Johnson Coliseum (3,687); Nacogdoches, TX
02/08/2014; 7:30 pm	at Northwestern State	L 73–86	10–10 (7–4)	Prather Coliseum (2,022); Natchitoches, LA
02/13/2014; 7:45 pm	at New Orleans	L 64–70	10–11 (7–5)	Lakefront Arena (1,142); New Orleans, LA
02/15/2014; 4:30 pm	at Southeastern Louisiana	L 66–71	10–12 (7–6)	University Center (601); Hammond, LA
02/22/2014; 3:30 pm	McNeese State	W 68–59	11–12 (8–6)	Stopher Gym (545); Thibodaux, LA
02/27/2014; 7:30 pm	Abilene Christian	W 79–60	12–12 (9–6)	Stopher Gym (347); Thibodaux, LA
03/01/2014; 3:30 pm	Incarnate Word	L 67–69	12–13 (9–7)	Stopher Gym (465); Thibodaux, LA
03/06/2014; 7:30 pm	at Houston Baptist	W 75–62	13–13 (10–7)	Sharp Gymnasium (553); Houston, TX
03/08/2014; 2:30 pm	at Texas A&M–Corpus Christi	L 44–58	13–14 (10–8)	American Bank Center (1,236); Corpus Christi, TX
Southland tournament
03/12/2014; 5:00 pm	vs. Southeastern Louisiana; First round	W 71–64	14–14	Merrell Center (1,009); Katy, TX
03/13/2014; 5:00 pm	vs. Northwestern State; Quarterfinals	L 72–88	14–15	Merrell Center (1,213); Katy, TX
*Non-conference game. ^{#}Rankings from AP Poll. (#) Tournament seedings in parentheses. All times are in Central Time.
