= 2013–14 Oral Roberts Golden Eagles men's basketball team =

American college basketball season

2013–14 Oral Roberts Golden Eagles men's basketball

Cancun Challenge Mayan Division champions
- Conference: Southland Conference
- Record: 17–16 (10–8 Southland)
- Head coach: Scott Sutton (15th season)
- Assistant coaches: Kyan Brown; Wade Mason; Sean Sutton
- Home arena: Mabee Center

2013–14 Southland Conference men's basketball standings
	Conf.				Overall
Team	W		L	PCT	W		L	PCT
Stephen F. Austin †	18	–	0	1.000	32	–	3	.914
Texas A&M–CC	14	–	4	.778	18	–	16	.529
Sam Houston State	13	–	5	.722	24	–	11	.686
Northwestern State	12	–	6	.667	17	–	14	.548
Incarnate Word*	9	–	5	.643	21	–	6	.778
Oral Roberts	10	–	8	.556	17	–	16	.515
Nicholls State	10	–	8	.556	14	–	15	.483
McNeese State	9	–	9	.500	11	–	20	.355
New Orleans**	8	–	10	.444	11	–	15	.423
Southeastern Louisiana	7	–	11	.389	12	–	18	.400
Central Arkansas	5	–	13	.278	8	–	21	.276
Lamar	3	–	15	.167	4	–	26	.133
Abilene Christian*	2	–	12	.143	11	–	20	.355
Houston Baptist	2	–	16	.111	6	–	25	.194
† 2014 Southland tournament winner Rankings from AP poll *ineligible for postseason play due to Div. I transition **ineligible for postseason play due to APR penalties

The 2013–14 Oral Roberts Golden Eagles men's basketball team represented Oral Roberts University during the 2013–14 NCAA Division I men's basketball season. The Golden Eagles were led by 15th year head coach Scott Sutton and played their home games at the Mabee Center. They were members of the Southland Conference. They finished the season 17–16, 10–8 in Southland play to finish in a tie for sixth place. They advanced to the quarterfinals of the Southland Conference tournament where they lost to Sam Houston State.

This was their last season as a member of the Southland as they will rejoin The Summit League in July, 2014 after leaving the league only two years previous.

== Roster ==
Number	Name	Position	Height	Weight	Year	Hometown
0	Jabbar Singleton	Guard	6–0	190	Freshman	New Orleans, Louisiana
1	Bobby Word	Guard	6–4	170	Freshman	Lancaster, Texas
3	Corbin Byford	Forward	6–6	215	Redshirt Freshman	Velma Alma, Oklahoma
4	David Mason	Guard	5–9	160	Senior	Tulsa, Oklahoma
5	Brandon Conley	Forward	6–6	225	Sophomore	Fort Worth, Texas
11	Shawn Glover	Guard/Forward	6–7	215	Senior	Dallas, TX
12	D. J. Jackson	Guard	5–11	175	Redshirt Sophomore	Kansas City, Missouri
15	Obi Emegano	Guard	6–4	215	Redshirt Sophomore	Edmond, Oklahoma
21	Josh White	Forward	6–6	210	Junior	Fort Worth, Texas
22	Adrion Webber	Forward	6–5	210	Junior	Muskogee, Oklahoma
23	Dederick Lee	Guard	6–2	165	Freshman	Clarksville, Arkansas
24	Korey Billbury	Guard	6–2	200	Redshirt Sophomore	Tulsa, Oklahoma
31	Jorden Kaufman	Center	7–0	245	Sophomore	Andover, Kansas
34	Denell Henderson	Forward	6–7	235	Junior	Damascus, Arkansas
35	Drew Wilson	Forward	6–7	220	Redshirt Sophomore	Tulsa, Oklahoma

== Schedule ==
Date time, TV	Opponent	Result	Record	Site (attendance) city, state
Exhibition
11/02/2013*; 6:00 pm	Northwood	W 98–76	–	Mabee Center (N/A); Tulsa, OK
11/06/2013*; 7:00 pm	Rogers State	W 90–66	–	Mabee Center (3,095); Tulsa, OK
Regular season
11/10/2013*; 5:05 pm	at Tulsa; PSO Mayors Cup	W 74–68	1–0	Reynolds Center (6,160); Tulsa, OK
11/13/2013*; 7:00 pm, FSKC/FCS	at Kansas State	L 63–71	1–1	Bramlage Coliseum (11,638); Manhattan, KS
11/16/2013*; 3:00 pm, KGEB/FCS	Texas State	W 82–65	2–1	Mabee Center (3,905); Tulsa, OK
11/21/2013*; 7:00 pm, FSMW+	at Saint Louis; Cancún Challenge	L 55–72	2–2	Chaifetz Arena (6,143); St. Louis, MO
11/23/2013*; 7:30 pm, BTN	at No. 12 Wisconsin; Cancún Challenge	L 67–76	2–3	Kohl Center (16,710); Madison, WI
11/26/2013*; 2:00 pm	vs. Georgia Southern; Cancún Challenge	W 67–65	3–3	Hard Rock Hotel Riviera Maya (203); Cancún, Mexico
11/27/2013*; 3:00 pm	vs. Bowling Green; Cancún Challenge	W 63–56	4–3	Hard Rock Hotel Riviera Maya (934); Cancún, Mexico
12/03/2013*; 7:00 pm	Cameron	W 74–64	5–3	Mabee Center (2,687); Tulsa, OK
12/07/2013*; 7:00 pm	at No. 11 Wichita State	L 58–71	5–4	Charles Koch Arena (10,506); Wichita, KS
12/13/2013*; 7:00 pm, FCS	Missouri State	L 67–70	5–5	Mabee Center (4,262); Tulsa, OK
12/16/2013*; 6:00 pm	at Akron	L 64–74	5–6	James A. Rhodes Arena (2,668); Akron, OH
12/21/2013*; 6:00 pm	Dallas Baptist	W 69–55	6–6	Mabee Center (3,322); Tulsa, OK
12/30/2013*; 7:00 pm, FSSW+	at No. 9 Baylor	L 55–81	6–7	Ferrell Center (8,037); Waco, TX
01/02/2014; 7:30 pm, FCS	Houston Baptist	W 88–55	7–7 (1–0)	Mabee Center (3,407); Tulsa, OK
01/04/2014; 6:00 pm, KGEB/FCS	Texas A&M–Corpus Christi	L 64–71	7–8 (1–1)	Mabee Center (3,524); Tulsa, OK
01/11/2014; 6:00 pm, KGEB/FCS	Central Arkansas	W 93–80	8–8 (2–1)	Mabee Center (3,923); Tulsa, OK
01/16/2014; 7:30 pm	at Abilene Christian	W 82–59	9–8 (3–1)	Moody Coliseum (941); Abilene, TX
01/18/2014; 4:00 pm	at Incarnate Word	W 79–77	10–8 (4–1)	McDermott Convocation Center (802); San Antonio, TX
01/23/2014; 7:30 pm, ESPN3	Stephen F. Austin	L 69–72	10–9 (4–2)	Mabee Center (3,484); Tulsa, OK
01/25/2014; 6:00 pm, KGEB/FCS	Northwestern State	L 83–87	10–10 (4–3)	Mabee Center (5,026); Tulsa, OK
01/30/2014; 7:30 pm, ESPN3	at Nicholls State	L 72–73 ^{OT}	10–11 (4–4)	Stopher Gym (1,178); Thibodaux, LA
02/01/2014; 3:00 pm	at McNeese State	L 68–79	10–12 (4–5)	Burton Coliseum (1,312); Lake Charles, LA
02/06/2014; 7:30 pm, FCS	New Orleans	W 79–59	11–12 (5–5)	Mabee Center (4,224); Tulsa, OK
02/08/2014; 7:00 pm, KGEB/FCS	Southeastern Louisiana	W 71–54	12–12 (6–5)	Mabee Center (6,035); Tulsa, OK
02/13/2014; 7:30 pm	at Houston Baptist	W 80–66	13–12 (7–5)	Sharp Gymnasium (751); Houston, TX
02/15/2014; 3:30 pm, CSNH	at Texas A&M–Corpus Christi	L 72–74 ^{OT}	13–13 (7–6)	American Bank Center (1,255); Corpus Christi, TX
02/22/2014; 4:00 pm	at Central Arkansas	W 63–50	14–13 (8–6)	Farris Center (575); Conway, AR
02/27/2014; 7:30 pm, FCS	Lamar	W 75–67	15–13 (9–6)	Mabee Center (4,839); Tulsa, OK
03/01/2014; 7:30 pm, KGEB/FCS	Sam Houston State	W 80–73	16–13 (10–6)	Mabee Center (6,431); Tulsa, OK
03/06/2014; 8:00 pm	at Stephen F. Austin	L 72–83	16–14 (10–7)	William R. Johnson Coliseum (5,314); Nacogdoches, TX
03/08/2014; 3:00 pm	at Northwestern State	L 82–88	16–15 (10–8)	Prather Coliseum (2,412); Natchitoches, LA
Southland tournament
03/12/2014; 7:30 pm	vs. McNeese State; First round	W 66–62	17–15	Merrell Center (1,009); Katy, TX
03/13/2014; 7:30 pm	vs. Sam Houston State; Quarterfinals	L 61–77	17–16	Merrell Center (1,213); Katy, TX
*Non-conference game. ^{#}Rankings from AP Poll. (#) Tournament seedings in parentheses. All times are in Central Time.

All KGEB games listed are games that will air live and will also air on GEB America. Each FCS weekday home game will air on KGEB and GEB America tape delayed at 11 pm.
