= 2013–14 Colonial Athletic Association men's basketball season =

- League: NCAA Division I
- Sport: Basketball
- Duration: November, 2013 – March, 2014
- Teams: 9

Regular Season
- Champion: Delaware
- Runners-up: Towson
- Season MVP: Jerrelle Benimon (Towson)
- Top scorer: Jerrelle Benimon (Towson)

Tournament
- Champions: Delaware
- Runners-up: William & Mary
- Finals MVP: Jarvis Threatt (Delaware)

CAA men's basketball seasons
- ← 2012–13 2014–15 , →

2013–14 CAA men's basketball standings
	Conf.				Overall
Team	W		L	PCT	W		L	PCT
Delaware †	14	–	2	.875	25	–	10	.714
Towson	13	–	3	.813	25	–	11	.694
William & Mary	10	–	6	.625	20	–	12	.625
Drexel	8	–	8	.500	16	–	14	.533
Northeastern	7	–	9	.438	11	–	21	.344
College of Charleston	6	–	10	.375	14	–	18	.438
James Madison	6	–	10	.375	11	–	20	.355
Hofstra	5	–	11	.313	10	–	23	.303
UNC Wilmington	3	–	13	.188	9	–	23	.281
† 2014 CAA tournament winner Rankings from AP poll

The 2013–14 CAA men's basketball season marked the 29th season of Colonial Athletic Association basketball, taking place between November 2013 and March 2014. Practices commenced in October 2013, and the season ended with the 2014 Colonial Athletic Association men's basketball tournament.

== Preseason ==
=== Coaching changes ===
- Joe Mihalich was hired after a year of turmoil on and off the court led to Head Coach Mo Cassara being relieved of duties on March 22, 2013.

=== Preseason poll ===
Rank	Team
1	Towson
2	Drexel
3	College of Charleston
4	Delaware
5	William & Mary
6	Northeastern
7	James Madison
8	UNC Wilmington
9	Hofstra

=== Preseason All-Conference Teams ===
Award	Recipients
First Team	Jerrelle Benimon (Towson) Damion Lee (Drexel); Frantz Massenat (Drexel); Devon Saddler (Delaware); Marcus Thornton (William & Mary)
Second Team	Adjehi Baru (College of Charleston) Quincy Ford (Northeastern); Andre Nation (James Madison); Tim Rusthoven (William & Mary); Jarvis Threatt (Delaware)

Colonial Athletic Association Preseason Player of the Year: Jerrelle Benimon, Towson

== Regular season ==
=== Head coaches ===
- Doug Wojcik, Charleston
- Monté Ross, Delaware
- Bruiser Flint, Drexel
- Joe Mihalich, Hofstra
- Matt Brady, James Madison
- Bill Coen, Northeastern
- Pat Skerry, Towson
- Buzz Peterson, UNC Wilmington
- Tony Shaver, William & Mary

=== Rankings ===
Legend
Increase in ranking
Decrease in ranking
Not ranked previous week

		Pre	Wk 2	Wk 3	Wk 4	Wk 5	Wk 6	Wk 7	Wk 8	Wk 9	Wk 10	Wk 11	Wk 12	Wk 13	Wk 14	Wk 15	Wk 16	Wk 17	Wk 18	Wk 19	Final
College of Charleston	AP																				
College of Charleston	C																				
Delaware	AP																				
Delaware	C																				
Drexel	AP																				
Drexel	C																				
James Madison	AP																				
James Madison	C																				
Northeastern	AP																				
Northeastern	C																				
Towson	AP		RV	NR																	
Towson	C																				
UNC Wilmington	AP																				
UNC Wilmington	C																				
William & Mary	AP																				
William & Mary	C																				

== Postseason ==
=== Colonial Athletic Association tournament ===
- March 7–10, 2014: Colonial Athletic Association Men's Basketball Tournament, Baltimore Arena, Baltimore, Maryland

Delaware defeated William & Mary, 75–74, in the finals of the 2014 CAA men's basketball tournament to win the conference, and earn an automatic bid to the 2014 NCAA Men's Division I Basketball Tournament.

=== NCAA tournament ===
The CAA had one bid to the 2014 NCAA Men's Division I Basketball Tournament, that being the automatic bid of Delaware.

Seed	Region	School	First Four	Round of 64	Round of 32	Sweet 16	Elite Eight	Final Four	Championship
13	East	Delaware	Bye	Eliminated by Michigan State 78-93					
	Bids	W-L (%):	0–0 –	0–1 .000	0–0 –	0–0 –	0–0 –	0–0 –	TOTAL: 0–1 .000

=== National Invitation tournament ===
No teams from the CAA were invited to play in the 2014 National Invitation Tournament.

=== College Basketball Invitational ===
No teams from the CAA were invited to play in the 2014 College Basketball Invitational.

=== CollegeInsider.com Postseason tournament ===
Towson was invited to play in the 2014 CollegeInsider.com Postseason Tournament

School	First Round	Second Round	Quarterfinals	Semifinals	Championship
Towson	Defeated USC Upstate 63-60	Defeated East Tennessee State 83-77	Eliminated by Murray State 73-85		
W-L (%):	1–0 1.000	1–0 1.000	0–1 .000	0–0 –	TOTAL: 2–1 .667

== Awards and honors ==
=== Regular season ===
==== CAA Player-of-the-Week ====
- Nov. 11 - Frantz Massenat, Drexel
- Nov. 18 – Jerrelle Benimon, Towson
- Nov. 25 – Scott Eatherton, Northeastern
- Dec. 2 – Chris Fouch, Drexel
- Dec. 9 – Kyle Anderson, Delaware
- Dec. 16 – Frantz Massenat, Drexel (2)
- Dec. 23 – Ron Curry, James Madison
- Dec. 30 – Willis Hall, Charleston
- Jan. 6 – Willis Hall, Charleston (2), and Marcus Thornton, William and Mary
- Jan. 13 – Devon Saddler, Delaware
- Jan. 20 – Jerrelle Benimon, Towson (2)
- Jan. 27 – Scott Eatherton, Northeastern (2), and Devon Saddler, Delaware (2)
- Feb. 3 – Frantz Massenat, Drexel (3), and Marcus Thornton, William and Mary (2)
- Feb. 10 – Davon Usher, Delaware
- Feb. 17 – Davon Usher, Delaware (2)
- Feb. 24 - Jerrelle Benimon, Towson (3), and Zeke Upshaw, Hofstra
- Mar. 3 – Jerrelle Benimon, Towson (4)

==== CAA Rookie-of-the-Week ====
- Nov. 11 - Jamall Robinson, Hofstra
- Nov. 18 – Canyon Barry, College of Charleston and Omar Prewitt, William and Mary
- Nov. 25 – Omar Prewitt, William and Mary (2)
- Dec. 2 – Omar Prewitt, William and Mary (3)
- Dec. 9 – Jackson Kent, James Madison
- Dec. 16 – Jamall Robinson, Hofstra (2)
- Dec. 23 – Omar Prewitt, William and Mary (4)
- Dec. 30 – Jamall Robinson, Hofstra (3)
- Jan. 6 – Omar Prewitt, William and Mary (5)
- Jan. 13 – Omar Prewitt, William and Mary (6)
- Jan. 20 – Rodney Williams, Drexel
- Jan. 27 – Jackson Kent, James Madison (2)
- Feb. 3 – Jamall Robinson, Hofstra (4)
- Feb. 10 – T. J. Williams, Northeastern
- Feb. 17 – Yohanny Dalembert, James Madison and Rodney Williams, Drexel (2)
- Feb. 24 - T. J. Williams, Northeastern (2)
- Mar. 3 – Omar Prewitt, William and Mary (7), and Jamall Robinson, Hofstra (5)

=== Postseason ===
==== CAA All-Conference Teams and Awards ====
Award	Recipients
Coach of the Year	Monté Ross (Delaware)
Player of the Year	Jerrelle Benimon (Towson)
Defensive Player of the Year	Scott Eatherton (Northeastern)
Rookie of the Year	Omar Prewitt (William & Mary)
Dean Ehlers Leadership Award	Tim Rusthoven (William & Mary)
First Team	Jerrelle Benimon (Towson); Frantz Massenat (Drexel); Devon Sadler (Delaware); Marcus Thornton (William & Mary); Davon Usher (Delaware)
Second Team	Scott Eatherton (Northeastern); Chris Fouch (Drexel); Willis Hall (Charleston); Tim Rusthoven (William & Mary); Zeke Upshaw (Hofstra)
Third Team	Carl Baptiste (Delaware); Charles Cooke (James Madison); Marcus Damas (Towson); Rafriel Guthrie (Towson); Andre Nation (James Madison); Dion Nesmith (Delaware)
All-Defensive Team	Jerrelle Benimon (Towson); Scott Eatherton (Northeastern); Davon Usher (Delaware); David Walker (Northeastern); Adjehi Baru (Charleston)
All-Rookie Team	Jamall Robinson (Hofstra); Canyon Barry (Charleston); Omar Prewitt (William & Mary); Rodney Williams (Drexel); TJ Williams (Northeastern)
All-Academic Team	Kyle Anderson (Delaware); Canyon Barry (Charleston); Brandon Britt (William & Mary); Kyle Gaillard (William & Mary); Willis Hall (Charleston); Tanner Milson (UNCW); Dion Nesmith (Hofstra); Timajh Parker-Rivera (Towson); Shane Reybold (UNCW); Tim Rusthoven (William & Mary)
All-Tournament Team	Jarvis Threatt (Delaware); Carl Baptiste (Delaware); Devon Sadler (Delaware); Marcus Thornton (William & Mary); Brandon Britt (William & Mary); Scott Eatherton (Northeastern)
Tournament MVP	Jarvis Threatt (Delaware)
