= 2013–14 Drexel Dragons men's basketball team =

American college basketball season

2013–14 Drexel Dragons men's basketball
- Conference: Colonial Athletic Association
- Record: 16–14 (8–8 CAA)
- Head coach: Bruiser Flint (13th season)
- Assistant coaches: Mike Connors (6th season); Matt Collier (4th season); Bobby Jordan (2nd season)
- MVPs: Chris Fouch; Frantz Massenat
- Home arena: Daskalakis Athletic Center

2013–14 CAA men's basketball standings
	Conf.				Overall
Team	W		L	PCT	W		L	PCT
Delaware †	14	–	2	.875	25	–	10	.714
Towson	13	–	3	.813	25	–	11	.694
William & Mary	10	–	6	.625	20	–	12	.625
Drexel	8	–	8	.500	16	–	14	.533
Northeastern	7	–	9	.438	11	–	21	.344
College of Charleston	6	–	10	.375	14	–	18	.438
James Madison	6	–	10	.375	11	–	20	.355
Hofstra	5	–	11	.313	10	–	23	.303
UNC Wilmington	3	–	13	.188	9	–	23	.281
† 2014 CAA tournament winner Rankings from AP poll

The 2013–14 Drexel Dragons men's basketball team represented Drexel University during the 2013–14 NCAA Division I men's basketball season. The Dragons, led by 13th year head coach Bruiser Flint, played their home games at the Daskalakis Athletic Center and were members of the Colonial Athletic Association.

On November 18, 2013, head coach Bruiser Flint recorded his 300th career win as an NCAA basketball head coach in defeating Elon. This game was also Bruiser's 214th win as the head coach at Drexel University, making him the winningest coach in Drexel basketball history. Bruiser was recognized for his accomplishments before the home-opener against Cleveland State on December 4.

They finished the season 16–14, 8–8 in CAA play to finish in fourth place. They lost in the quarterfinals of the CAA tournament to Northeastern.

== Pre-season ==
=== Departures ===
Name	Number	Pos.	Height	Weight	Year	Hometown	Notes
Casey Carroll	20	F	6'8"	225	RS Fr	Canfield, Ohio	Transferred to Nova Southeastern
Aquil Younger	2	G	6'0"	163	So	Philadelphia, Pennsylvania	Transferred to Shaw University
Derrick Thomas	32	G	6'4"	195	Sr	New York City, New York	Graduated
Daryl McCoy	44	F	6'9"	280	Sr	Hartford, Connecticut	Graduated, signed to Ferroviario de Beira (Mozambique, D1)

=== Incoming transfers ===
College recruiting information
Name	Hometown	School	Height	Weight	Commit date
Freddie Wilson; PG	New Haven, Connecticut	Seton Hall	6 ft 2 in (1.88 m)	175 lb (79 kg)	N/A
Freddie Wilson; PG	Recruit ratings: Scout: Rivals: ESPN: (86)				
Overall recruit ranking:
Note: In many cases, Scout, Rivals, 247Sports, On3, and ESPN may conflict in their listings of height and weight.; In these cases, the average was taken. ESPN grades are on a 100-point scale.; Sources:

- Junior point guard Freddie Wilson was not eligible to play until the end of the fall semester due to NCAA transfer rules.

=== Class of 2013 commitments ===
College recruiting information
Name	Hometown	School	Height	Weight	Commit date
Major Canady; SG	Wilson, North Carolina	The Kiski School	6 ft 3 in (1.91 m)	205 lb (93 kg)	Jun 29, 2012
Major Canady; SG	Recruit ratings: Scout: ESPN: (65)				
Mohamed Bah; C	Bamako, Mali	Lee Academy	6 ft 9 in (2.06 m)	228 lb (103 kg)	Oct 16, 2012
Mohamed Bah; C	Recruit ratings: ESPN: (67)				
Rodney Williams; PF	Richmond, Virginia	St. Christopher's School	6 ft 7 in (2.01 m)	220 lb (100 kg)	Jul 9, 2012
Rodney Williams; PF	Recruit ratings: ESPN: (65)				
Khris Lane; PF	Richmond, Virginia	Benedictine High School	6 ft 6 in (1.98 m)	215 lb (98 kg)	Jun 12, 2013
Khris Lane; PF	Recruit ratings: No ratings found				
Overall recruit ranking:
Note: In many cases, Scout, Rivals, 247Sports, On3, and ESPN may conflict in their listings of height and weight.; In these cases, the average was taken. ESPN grades are on a 100-point scale.; Sources: "ESPN". ESPN.

== Roster ==
2013–14 Drexel Dragons men's basketball team
Players
Coaches

Pos.	#	Name	Height	Weight	Year	Previous school	Hometown
G	1	Freddie Wilson	6 ft 3 in (1.91 m)	175 lb (79 kg)	Jr	Hillhouse H.S.	New Haven, Connecticut
G	3	Chris Fouch (6th Year Sr)	6 ft 2 in (1.88 m)	185 lb (84 kg)	RS Sr	Rice H.S.	New York City, New York
G	4	Frantz Massenat	6 ft 4 in (1.93 m)	185 lb (84 kg)	Sr	Trenton Catholic H.S.	Ewing, New Jersey
G	5	Stevan Manojlovic	6 ft 5 in (1.96 m)	197 lb (89 kg)	So	Martingrove Collegiate Institute	Toronto, Ontario
G/F	11	Tavon Allen	6 ft 7 in (2.01 m)	190 lb (86 kg)	RS So	Hillhouse H.S.	New Haven, Connecticut
F/C	13	Goran Pantovic	6 ft 10 in (2.08 m)	225 lb (102 kg)	Sr	Life Center Academy (NJ)	Belgrade, Serbia
G/F	14	Damion Lee (injured) (redshirt)	6 ft 6 in (1.98 m)	200 lb (91 kg)	Jr	Calvert Hall H.S.	Baltimore, Maryland
F/C	15	Mohamed Bah	6 ft 9 in (2.06 m)	225 lb (102 kg)	Fr	Lee Academy (ME)	Bamako, Mali
F	21	Khris Lane	6 ft 6 in (1.98 m)	215 lb (98 kg)	Fr	Benedictine H.S.	Richmond, Virginia
G	22	Jake Lerner (W)	6 ft 2 in (1.88 m)	190 lb (86 kg)	Sr	Abington Friends School	Philadelphia, Pennsylvania
F	24	Rodney Williams	6 ft 7 in (2.01 m)	220 lb (100 kg)	Fr	St. Christopher's School (VA)	Richmond, Virginia
G	25	Major Canady	6 ft 4 in (1.93 m)	200 lb (91 kg)	Fr	The Kiski School (PA)	Wilson, North Carolina
F	32	Kazembe Abif (injured)	6 ft 7 in (2.01 m)	215 lb (98 kg)	Jr	University H.S. (NJ)	Elizabeth, New Jersey
F/C	35	Dartaye Ruffin	6 ft 8 in (2.03 m)	250 lb (113 kg)	Sr	New Hampton H.S.	Stoughton, Massachusetts

Head coach

- James "Bruiser" Flint (Saint Joseph's)

Assistant coach(es)

- Mike Connors (Ithaca)
- Matt Collier (UMass)
- Bobby Jordan (Drexel)

Legend

- (C) Team captain
- (S) Suspended
- (I) Ineligible
- (W) Walk-on
- Injured
- Current redshirt

- Shooting guard Chris Fouch is coming off his second red-shirt season, after suffering a second season-ending injury in 2012. He is classified as a graduate student.
- Starting guard Damion Lee suffered a Torn ACL in a game against Arizona on November 27, 2013. He is expected to Redshirt this season, and maintain 2 years of eligibility remaining entering the 2014–15 season
- Junior forward Kazembe Abif fractured his left hand during practice on February 6, 2014, which required season ending surgery. Prior to this injury, Abif missed 5 games due to a sprained knee, and 1 game due to a concussion.

=== Depth chart ===
Pos.	Starting 5	Bench 1	Bench 2	Bench 3
C	Dartaye Ruffin	Mohamed Bah	Goran Pantovic
PF	Kazembe Abif	Rodney Williams	Khris Lane
SF	Damion Lee	Tavon Allen
SG	Chris Fouch	Major Canady	Stevan Manojlovic	Jake Lerner
PG	Frantz Massenat	Freddie Wilson

== Schedule ==
Date time, TV	Rank^{#}	Opponent^{#}	Result	Record	High points	High rebounds	High assists	Site (attendance) city, state
Non-conference regular season
November 8, 2013*; 11:59 pm, P12N		at No. 22 UCLA	L 67–72	0–1	20 – Massenat	13 – Ruffin	5 – Massenat	Pauley Pavilion (6,859); Los Angeles
November 12, 2013*; 8:00 pm, TCN/ESPN3		at Illinois State	W 78–70	1–1	26 – Fouch	13 – Abif	7 – Massenat	Redbird Arena (4,313); Normal, Illinois
November 18, 2013*; 5:00 pm	(8)	vs. (6) Elon; NIT Season Tip-Off First Round	W 71–64	2–1	22 – Fouch	9 – Abif	3 – Massenat	The RAC (2,106); Piscataway, New Jersey
November 19, 2013*; 7:30 pm, ESPN3	(8)	at (4) Rutgers; NIT Season Tip-Off Quarterfinals	W 70–59	3–1	21 – Allen	9 – Ruffin	9 – Massenat	The RAC (3,025); Piscataway, New Jersey
November 27, 2013*; 7:00 pm, ESPNU	(8)	vs. (1) No. 4 Arizona; NIT Season Tip-Off Semifinals	L 62–66	3–2	29 – Fouch	10 – Williams	2 – Tied	Madison Square Garden (8,741); New York City
November 29, 2013*; 3:30 pm, ESPN2	(8)	vs. (3) Alabama; NIT Season Tip-Off Consolation Game	W 85–83 ^{3OT}	4–2	19 – Fouch	11 – Abif	4 – Tied	Madison Square Garden (13,266); New York City
December 4, 2013*; 7:00 pm		Cleveland State	W 85–82 ^{3OT}	5–2	23 – Allen	14 – Ruffin	9 – Massenat	Daskalakis Athletic Center (2,127); Philadelphia
December 7, 2013*; 4:00 pm		Tennessee State	W 75–61	6–2	21 – Massenat	8 – Tied	6 – Massenat	Daskalakis Athletic Center (1,997); Philadelphia
December 15, 2013*; 2:00 pm		at Davidson	W 72–58	7–2	25 – Massenat	11 – Ruffin	2 – Tied	John M. Belk Arena (3,430); Davidson, North Carolina
December 18, 2013*; 7:00 pm, TCN		at Saint Joseph's	L 55–75	7–3	20 – Allen	10 – Williams	4 – Tied	Hagan Arena (3,651); Philadelphia
December 22, 2013*; 2:00 pm		Saint Francis (PA)	W 59–49	8–3	15 – Fouch	11 – Abif	6 – Allen	Daskalakis Athletic Center (1,523); Philadelphia
December 29, 2013*; 2:00 pm		Buffalo	L 52–55	8–4	14 – Allen	12 – Ruffin	5 – Massenat	Daskalakis Athletic Center (1,503); Philadelphia
January 3, 2014*; 2:00 pm		at Southern Miss	L 49–66	8–5	15 – Allen	4 – Fouch	4 – Massenat	Reed Green Coliseum (6,082); Hattiesburg, Mississippi
CAA regular season
January 8, 2014; 7:00 pm		at William & Mary	L 73–85	8–6 (0–1)	19 – Massenat	7 – Pantovic	4 – Massenat	Kaplan Arena (2,729); Williamsburg, Virginia
January 11, 2014; 2:00 pm, TCN		Northeastern	W 93–88 ^{2OT}	9–6 (1–1)	31 – Fouch	12 – Massenat	8 – Massenat	Daskalakis Athletic Center (2,509); Philadelphia
January 14, 2014; 7:00 pm, CSN		Towson	L 68–80	9–7 (1–2)	28 – Fouch	14 – Williams	4 – Massenat	Daskalakis Athletic Center (1,672); Philadelphia
January 18, 2014; 2:00 pm		at UNC Wilmington	W 79–63	10–7 (2–2)	30 – Massenat	8 – Williams	8 – Massenat	Trask Coliseum (3,614); Wilmington, North Carolina
January 20, 2014; 7:00 pm, NBCSN		Delaware	L 77–90	10–8 (2–3)	20 – Massenat	6 – Ruffin	10 – Massenat	Daskalakis Athletic Center (2,017); Philadelphia
January 25, 2014; 4:00 pm		William & Mary	L 66–68	10–9 (2–4)	31 – Fouch	9 – Ruffin	4 – Tied	Daskalakis Athletic Center (2,457); Philadelphia
January 29, 2014; 7:00 pm		at Hofstra	W 77–74	11–9 (3–4)	32 – Massenat	8 – Ruffin	9 – Massenat	Mack Sports Complex (778); Hempstead, New York
February 1, 2014; 4:30 pm, NBCSN		at Towson	L 73–75	11–10 (3–5)	18 – Massenat	10 – Ruffin	5 – Massenat	SECU Arena (3,870); Towson, Maryland
February 3, 2014; 7:00 pm		UNC Wilmington	W 61–50	12–10 (4–5)	17 – Allen	6 – Ruffin	5 – Massenat	Daskalakis Athletic Center (917); Philadelphia
February 8, 2014; 2:00 pm		James Madison	W 78–60	13–10 (5–5)	26 – Fouch	10 – Williams	4 – Massenat	Daskalakis Athletic Center (2,023); Philadelphia
February 13, 2014; 7:00 pm, NBCSN		at College of Charleston	L 46–47	13–11 (5–6)	16 – Massenat	10 – Allen	1 – Tied	TD Arena (3,613); Charleston, South Carolina
February 16, 2014; 8:00 pm, CSN		Hofstra	W 74–63	14–11 (6–6)	24 – Massenat	9 – Ruffin	7 – Massenat	Daskalakis Athletic Center (1,814); Philadelphia
February 19, 2014; 7:00 pm, CSN		at James Madison	L 61–63 ^{OT}	14–12 (6–7)	15 – Massenat	11 – Ruffin	2 – Massenat	JMU Convocation Center (3,011); Harrisonburg, Virginia
February 23, 2014; 3:00 pm, CSN		at Delaware	W 69–65	15–12 (7–7)	25 – Allen	11 – Ruffin	4 – Allen	Bob Carpenter Center (5,122); Newark, Delaware
February 26, 2014; 7:00 pm		College of Charleston; Senior night	W 58–45	16–12 (8–7)	24 – Massenat	10 – Ruffin	4 – Massenat	Daskalakis Athletic Center (2,016); Philadelphia
March 1, 2014; 1:00 pm		at Northeastern	L 52–54	16–13 (8–8)	26 – Fouch	7 – Ruffin	4 – Massenat	Matthews Arena (1,123); Boston
CAA Tournament
March 8, 2014; 2:30 pm, CSN	(4)	vs. (5) Northeastern; Quarterfinals	L 81–90	16–14	30 – Fouch	7 – Tied	5 – Allen	Baltimore Arena (2,998); Baltimore
*Non-conference game. ^{#}Rankings from AP Poll. (#) Tournament seedings in parentheses. All times are in Eastern Time.

== Team statistics ==
As of the end of the season.
Indicates team leader in each category.
(FG%, FT% leader = minimum 50 att.; 3P% leader = minimum 20 att.)

Player	GP	GS	MPG	PPG	RPG	APG	SPG	BPG	TPG	FG%	FT%	3P%
Kazembe Abif	16	12	30.6	7.2	6.6	0.4	0.7	0.4	0.9	.468	.750	.500
Tavon Allen	28	10	29.5	11.7	3.0	1.9	0.7	0.3	1.6	.396	.654	.280
Mohamed Bah	24	1	11.7	2.0	2.7	0.1	0.1	0.5	0.1	.633	.526	.000
Major Canady	30	14	16.0	2.1	1.7	0.9	0.4	0.0	0.6	.333	.576	.214
Chris Fouch	30	30	35.4	18.3	3.2	2.0	0.9	0.1	1.3	.399	.822	.324
Khris Lane	4	0	1.8	0.0	0.0	0.0	0.3	0.0	0.0	.000	.000	.000
Damion Lee	5	5	26.8	13.0	4.2	2.2	0.6	0.2	1.4	.370	.864	.273
Jake Lerner	5	0	0.8	0.4	0.0	0.2	0.0	0.0	0.0	1.000	.000	.000
Stevan Manojlovic	7	1	2.1	0.4	0.3	0.4	0.1	0.0	0.3	1.000	.000	1.000
Frantz Massenat	30	30	36.8	17.5	3.8	4.7	0.8	0.4	1.9	.405	.721	.353
Goran Pantovic	12	3	13.4	1.2	3.4	0.2	0.3	1.6	0.3	.500	.400	.000
Dartaye Ruffin	28	26	29.6	5.0	7.7	0.6	0.8	0.7	0.9	.581	.567	.000
Rodney Williams	30	18	20.8	5.4	5.0	0.4	0.2	1.2	0.9	.518	.639	.000
Freddie Wilson	19	0	11.1	2.6	1.1	0.8	0.3	0.1	0.6	.313	.667	.222
Team	30	-	-	69	36	12	5	4	9	.421	.709	.314

== Awards ==
Frantz Massenat

- Team co-Most Valuable Player
- First Team NABC All-District Team
- CAA All-Conference First Team
- Assist Award (team leader in assists)
- CAA Player Of The Week (3)
- 2013 NIT Season Tip-Off All-Tournament Team
- Preseason CAA All-Conference Team

Chris Fouch

- Team co-Most Valuable Player
- Philadelphia Inquirer Academic All-Area Men's Basketball Performer of the Year
- Philadelphia Inquirer Academic All-Area Men's Basketball Team (held a 3.56 GPA)
- Second Team NABC All-District Team
- CAA All-Conference Second Team
- CAA Player Of The Week

Rodney Williams

- Samuel D. Cozen Award (most improved player)
- CAA All-Rookie Team
- CAA Rookie Of The Week (2)

Damion Lee

- Preseason CAA All-Conference First Team

Tavon Allen

- Dragon "D" Award (team's top defensive player)

Dartaye Ruffin

- "Sweep" Award (team leader in blocks)

Steve Manojlovic

- Team Academic Award (held a 3.62 GPA)

Jake Lerner

- Donald Shank Spirit & Dedication Award
