= 2013–14 Towson Tigers men's basketball team =

American college basketball season

2013–14 Towson Tigers men's basketball

CIT Quarterfinals vs. Murray State, L 73–85
- Conference: Colonial Athletic Association
- Record: 25–11 (13–3 CAA)
- Head coach: Pat Skerry (3rd season)
- Assistant coaches: Kevin Clark; Jim McCarthy; Bruce Shingler
- Home arena: SECU Arena

2013–14 CAA men's basketball standings
| | Conf. | | | | Overall |
| Team | W | | L | PCT | W | | L | PCT |
|---|---|---|---|---|---|---|---|---|
| Delaware † | 14 | – | 2 | .875 | 25 | – | 10 | .714 |
| Towson | 13 | – | 3 | .813 | 25 | – | 11 | .694 |
| William & Mary | 10 | – | 6 | .625 | 20 | – | 12 | .625 |
| Drexel | 8 | – | 8 | .500 | 16 | – | 14 | .533 |
| Northeastern | 7 | – | 9 | .438 | 11 | – | 21 | .344 |
| College of Charleston | 6 | – | 10 | .375 | 14 | – | 18 | .438 |
| James Madison | 6 | – | 10 | .375 | 11 | – | 20 | .355 |
| Hofstra | 5 | – | 11 | .313 | 10 | – | 23 | .303 |
| UNC Wilmington | 3 | – | 13 | .188 | 9 | – | 23 | .281 |
† 2014 CAA tournament winner Rankings from AP poll

The 2013–14 Towson Tigers men's basketball team represented Towson University during the 2013–14 NCAA Division I men's basketball season. The Tigers, led by third year head coach Pat Skerry, played their home games at the brand new SECU Arena and were members of the Colonial Athletic Association. They finished the season 25–11, 13–3 in CAA play to finish in second place. They advanced to the semifinals of the CAA tournament where they lost to William & Mary. They were invited to the CollegeInsider.com Tournament where they defeated USC Upstate and East Tennessee State to advance to the quarterfinals where they lost to Murray State.

== Roster ==
| Number | Name | Position | Height | Weight | Year | Hometown |
|---|---|---|---|---|---|---|
| 0 | Jerome Hairston* | Guard | 6–3 | 190 | Sophomore | Cheyenne, Wyoming |
| 1 | Marcus Damas | Forward | 6–7 | 210 | Senior | Bay Shore, New York |
| 2 | Marquis Marshall | Guard | 6–5 | 170 | RS Freshman | Reading, Pennsylvania |
| 3 | D. Cimini | Guard | 5-9 | 170 | Sophomore | Charlotte, North Carolina |
| 4 | Four McGlynn | Guard | 6–2 | 180 | RS Sophomore | York, Pennsylvania |
| 5 | Walter Foster | Forward/Center | 6–8 | 230 | Freshman | Atlanta |
| 10 | John Davis | Forward | 6–5 | 215 | Freshman | Philadelphia |
| 12 | Barrington Alston | Forward | 6–8 | 220 | RS Freshman | Wilmington, Delaware |
| 15 | Timajh Parker-Rivera | Forward | 6–7 | 215 | Sophomore | Milford, Connecticut |
| 20 | Jerrelle Benimon | Forward | 6–8 | 245 | Senior | Warrenton, Virginia |
| 22 | Rafriel Guthrie | Forward/Guard | 6–3 | 210 | Senior | Washington, D.C. |
| 23 | Mike Burwell | Guard | 6–5 | 205 | Senior | East Brunswick, New Jersey |
| 25 | A.J. Astroth | Guard | 6–6 | 200 | Sophomore | Tampa, Florida |
| 44 | Jamel Flash | Forward | 6–10 | 220 | Junior | West Hempstead, New York |

* Jerome Hairston left the team on January 7, 2014, after being suspended.

== Schedule ==
| Date time, TV | Opponent | Result | Record | Site (attendance) city, state |
Exhibition
| 10/24/2013*; 7:30 pm | Bloomsburg | W 86–65 | | SECU Arena (1,132); Towson, Maryland |
| 10/30/2013*; 7:30 pm | Mansfield | W 85–65 | | SECU Arena (929); Towson, Maryland |
Regular season
| 11/08/2013*; 7:30 pm | Navy | W 72–45 | 1–0 | SECU Arena (4,262); Towson, Maryland |
| 11/12/2013*; 7:30 pm | Morgan State | W 95–75 | 2–0 | SECU Arena (2,874); Towson, Maryland |
| 11/14/2013*; 7:30 pm, NBCSN | Temple | W 75–69 | 3–0 | SECU Arena (3,554); Towson, Maryland |
| 11/17/2013*; 5:00 pm, FS1 | at Villanova | L 44–78 | 3–1 | The Pavilion (6,500); Villanova, Pennsylvania |
| 11/22/2013*; 8:00 pm, ESPN3 | at No. 2 Kansas; Battle 4 Atlantis Opening Round | L 58–88 | 3–2 | Allen Fieldhouse (16,300); Lawrence, Kansas |
| 11/26/2013*; 7:30 pm | UMBC | W 75–60 | 4–2 | SECU Arena (1,879); Towson, Maryland |
| 11/29/2013*; 5:00 pm | The Citadel; Battle 4 Atlantis Mainland | W 84–59 | 5–2 | SECU Arena (1,293); Towson, Maryland |
| 11/30/2013*; 1:00 pm | Abilene Christian; Battle 4 Atlantis Mainland | W 74–47 | 6–2 | SECU Arena (1,120); Towson, Maryland |
| 12/06/2013*; 9:00 pm | at Stephen F. Austin; Lumberjack E-Tech Classic | L 69–79 | 6–3 | William R. Johnson Coliseum (1,823); Nacogdoches, Texas |
| 12/07/2013*; 9:00 pm, CSNMA | vs. Sam Houston State; Lumberjack E-Tech Classic | L 55–67 | 6–4 | William R. Johnson Coliseum (797); Nacogdoches, Texas |
| 12/10/2013*; 7:30 pm | Central Penn College | W 102–72 | 7–4 | SECU Arena (1,132); Towson, Maryland |
| 12/18/2013*; 10:00 pm, P12N | at Oregon State | L 67–76 | 7–5 | Gill Coliseum (3,042); Corvallis, Oregon |
| 12/21/2013*; 8:00 pm | at North Dakota State | L 82–90 | 7–6 | Bison Sports Arena (2,905); Fargo, North Dakota |
| 12/30/2013*; 7:30 pm | New Hampshire | W 72–64 | 8–6 | SECU Arena (1,945); Towson, Maryland |
| 01/04/2014*; 4:00 pm | at Coppin State | W 81–79 | 9–6 | Physical Education Complex (1,123); Baltimore |
| 01/11/2014; 2:00 pm | UNC Wilmington | W 60–53 | 10–6 (1–0) | SECU Arena (1,750); Towson, Maryland |
| 01/14/2014; 7:00 pm, CSNMA+ | at Drexel | W 80–68 | 11–6 (2–0) | Daskalakis Athletic Center (1,672); Philadelphia |
| 01/19/2014; 3:30 pm, NBCSN | at College of Charleston | W 72–57 | 12–6 (3–0) | TD Arena (3,219); Charleston, South Carolina |
| 01/22/2014; 7:00 pm | Northeastern | L 54–57 | 12–7 (3–1) | SECU Arena (1,177); Towson, Maryland |
| 01/25/2014; 12:00 pm | at Delaware | L 76–83 | 12–8 (3–2) | Bob Carpenter Center (4,138); Newark, Delaware |
| 01/27/2014; 7:00 pm, CSNMA | Hofstra | W 76–58 | 13–8 (4–2) | SECU Arena (2,328); Towson, Maryland |
| 02/01/2014; 4:30 pm, NBCSN | Drexel | W 75–73 | 14–8 (5–2) | SECU Arena (3,870); Towson, Maryland |
| 02/04/2014; 7:00 pm, CSNMA | James Madison | W 80–71 | 15–8 (6–2) | SECU Arena (2,582); Towson, Maryland |
| 02/08/2014; 2:00 pm, CSNMA | College of Charleston | W 68–61 ^{OT} | 16–8 (7–2) | SECU Arena (3,139); Towson, Maryland |
| 02/10/2014; 7:00 pm | at UNC Wilmington game postponed from 01/29/2014 | L 53–66 | 16–9 (7–3) | Trask Coliseum (2,451); Wilmington, North Carolina |
| 02/15/2014; 4:00 pm, CSNMA | at William & Mary | W 85–70 | 17–9 (8–3) | Kaplan Arena (3,306); Williamsburg, Virginia |
| 02/17/2014; 7:00 pm | Delaware | W 78–63 | 18–9 (9–3) | SECU Arena (4,003); Towson, Maryland |
| 02/20/2014; 7:00 pm, CSNMA+ | at Northeastern | W 79–70 | 19–9 (10–3) | Matthews Arena (1,026); Boston |
| 02/22/2014; 4:00 pm | at Hofstra | W 83–77 | 20–9 (11–3) | Mack Sports Complex (1,731); Hempstead, New York |
| 02/26/2014; 7:00 pm | at James Madison | W 69–66 | 21–9 (12–3) | JMU Convocation Center (4,108); Harrisonburg, Virginia |
| 03/01/2014; 4:00 pm, CSNMA | William & Mary | W 70–68 | 22–9 (13–3) | SECU Arena (4,119); Towson, Maryland |
CAA tournament
| 03/08/2014; 6:00 pm, CSN | vs. James Madison; Quarterfinals | W 80–71 | 23–9 | Baltimore Arena (4,897); Baltimore, Maryland |
| 03/09/2014; 5:00 pm, NBCSN | vs. William & Mary; Semifinals | L 71–75 | 23–10 | Baltimore Arena (4,051); Baltimore, Maryland |
CIT
| 03/19/2014*; 7:00 pm | at USC Upstate; First round | W 63–60 | 24–10 | Hodge Center (N/A); Spartanburg, South Carolina |
| 03/21/2014*; 7:00 pm | at East Tennessee State; Second round | W 83–77 | 25–10 | ETSU/MSHA Athletic Center (2,033); Johnson City, Tennessee |
| 03/27/2014*; 8:00 pm | at Murray State; Quarterfinals | L 73–85 | 25–11 | CFSB Center (3,063); Murray, Kentucky |
*Non-conference game. ^{#}Rankings from AP Poll. (#) Tournament seedings in parentheses. All times are in Eastern Time.
