= 2014 CAA men's basketball tournament =

- Tournament Logo
- Classification: Division I
- Season: 2013–14
- Teams: 9
- Site: Baltimore Arena; Baltimore, Maryland
- Champions: Delaware (1st title)
- Winning coach: Monté Ross (1st title)
- MVP: Jarvis Threatt (Delaware)
- Attendance: 19,065
- Top scorers: Jarvis Threatt (Delaware); Marcus Thornton (William & Mary) (59 points)
- Television: CAA.tv, CSN, NBCSN

2013–14 CAA men's basketball standings
	Conf.				Overall
Team	W		L	PCT	W		L	PCT
Delaware †	14	–	2	.875	25	–	10	.714
Towson	13	–	3	.813	25	–	11	.694
William & Mary	10	–	6	.625	20	–	12	.625
Drexel	8	–	8	.500	16	–	14	.533
Northeastern	7	–	9	.438	11	–	21	.344
College of Charleston	6	–	10	.375	14	–	18	.438
James Madison	6	–	10	.375	11	–	20	.355
Hofstra	5	–	11	.313	10	–	23	.303
UNC Wilmington	3	–	13	.188	9	–	23	.281
† 2014 CAA tournament winner Rankings from AP poll

The 2014 Colonial Athletic Association men's basketball tournament was held March 7–10 at the Baltimore Arena in Baltimore, Maryland. The champion received an automatic bid to the 2014 NCAA tournament.

The 2014 tournament featured nine teams due to the departure of George Mason from the conference to join the Atlantic 10, and the addition of the College of Charleston.

== Seeds ==
Seed	School	Conference	Overall
1	Delaware ‡†	14–2	22–9
2	Towson †	13–3	22–9
3	William & Mary †	10–6	18–11
4	Drexel †	8–8	16–13
5	Northeastern †	7–9	10–20
6	College of Charleston †	6–10	14–17
7	James Madison †	6–10	11–19
8	Hofstra	5–11	9–22
9	UNC Wilmington	3–13	9–22
‡ – CAA regular season champions. † – Received a bye in the conference tournament. Overall records are as of the end of the regular season.

== Schedule ==
Session	Game	Time*	Matchup^{#}	Television
First round – Friday March 7, 2014
1	1	7:00 pm	#9 UNC Wilmington 70 vs #8 Hofstra 78	CAA.TV
Quarterfinals – Saturday March 8, 2014
2	2	12:00 pm	#8 Hofstra 76 vs #1 Delaware 87	Comcast SportsNet
2	3	2:30 pm	#5 Northeastern 90 vs #4 Drexel 81	Comcast SportsNet
3	4	6:00 pm	#7 James Madison 71 vs #2 Towson 80	Comcast SportsNet
3	5	8:30 pm	#6 College of Charleston 59 vs #3 William & Mary 70	Comcast SportsNet
Semifinals – Sunday March 9, 2014
4	6	2:30 pm	#5 Northeastern 74 vs #1 Delaware 87	NBCSN
4	7	5:00 pm	#3 William & Mary 75 vs #2 Towson 71	NBCSN
Championship – Monday March 10, 2014
5	8	7:00 pm	#3 William & Mary 74 vs #1 Delaware 75	NBCSN
*Game times in ET. #-Rankings denote tournament seed

== Bracket ==
First round Friday, March 7 CAA.TV
8	Hofstra	78
9	UNC Wilmington	70

Quarterfinals; Saturday, March 8 Comcast SportsNet
1	Delaware	87
8	Hofstra	76
4	Drexel	81
5	Northeastern	90
2	Towson	80
7	James Madison	71
3	William & Mary	70
6	Charleston	59

Semifinals; Sunday, March 9 NBCSN
1	Delaware	87
5	Northeastern	74
2	Towson	71
3	William & Mary	75

Championship; Monday, March 10; NBCSN
1	Delaware	75
3	William & Mary	74

== Awards and honors ==
Tournament MVP

- Jarvis Threatt, Delaware

All-Tournament Team

- Jarvis Threatt, Delaware
- Carl Baptiste, Delaware
- Devon Sadler, Delaware
- Marcus Thornton, William & Mary
- Brandon Britt, William & Mary
- Scott Eatherton, Northeastern

== Game summaries ==
=== First round ===
CAA.tv

March 7
7:00 pm

Recap

#9 UNC Wilmington 70, #8 Hofstra 78
Scoring by half: 35-39, 35-39
Pts: Ponder - 26; Rebs: Sherwood - 7 Asts: Eblen - 5 Ponder - 2 Stls	Pts: Upshaw - 23; Rebs: Nwaukoni - 14; Asts: Allen - 4 Kone - 3 blocks, 2 steals

Baltimore Arena
Baltimore, MD
Attendance: 1,705
Referees: Sean Casady, Clarence Armstrong, Tim Comer

=== Quarterfinals ===
Comcast SportsNet

March 8
12:00 pm

Recap

#8 Hofstra 76, #1 Delaware 87
Scoring by half: 40-37, 36-50
Pts: Upshaw - 23; Rebs: Nwaukoni - 15; Asts: Nesmith - 4 Allen - 9 Pts, 10 Rebs	Pts: Usher - 28; Rebs: Usher - 8 Asts: Threatt - 4 Saddler - 15 Pts, 6 Rebs

Baltimore Arena
Baltimore, MD
Referees: Ron Tyburski, Tony Dawkins, Jeff Nichols

Comcast SportsNet

March 8
2:30 pm

Recap

#5 Northeastern 90, #4 Drexel 81
Scoring by half: 35-21, 55-60
Pts: Eatherton - 23; Rebs: Eatherton - 15; Asts: Tied - 3 Stahl - 19 Pts, 12 Rebs	Pts: Fouch - 30; Rebs: Tied - 7 Asts: Allen - 5 Massenat - 19 Pts

Baltimore Arena
Baltimore, MD
Attendance: 2,998
Referees: Dennis Allocco, Andrew Marotta, Tim Comer

Comcast SportsNet

March 8
6:00 pm

Recap

#7 James Madison 71, #2 Towson 80
Scoring by half: 27-34, 44-46
Pts: Nation - 18; Rebs: Satkus - 7 Asts: Curry - 5 Cooke - 14 Pts	Pts: McGlynn - 21; Rebs: Benimon - 10; Asts: Benimon - 4 Benimon - 18 Pts

Baltimore Arena
Baltimore, MD
Referees: Robert Testa, Sean Casady, John Gwynn

Comcast SportsNet

March 8
8:30 pm

Recap

#6 College of Charleston 59, #3 William & Mary 70
Scoring by half: 40-28, 19-42
Pts: Hall - 15; Rebs: Hall - 14; Asts: Stitt - 4 Thomas - 14 Pts	Pts: Tied - 16; Rebs: Tarpey - 8 Asts: Prewitt - 2 Tarpey - 9 Pts

Baltimore Arena
Baltimore, MD
Attendance: 4,897
Referees: Matt Oblas, Louie Andrakakos, Clarence Armstrong

=== Semifinals ===
NBCSN

March 9
2:30 pm

Recap

#5 Northeastern 74, #1 Delaware 87
Scoring by half: 37-39, 37-48
Pts: Eatherton - 20; Rebs: Tied - 8 Asts: Pollard - 3 Spencer - 18 Pts, 8 Rebs	Pts: Usher - 20; Rebs: Threatt - 11; Asts: Saddler - 9 Threatt - 19 Pts

Baltimore Arena
Baltimore, MD
Referees: William Humes, Joe Lindsay, Mike Eades

NBCSN

March 9
5:00 pm

Recap

#3 William & Mary 75, #2 Towson 71
Scoring by half: 36-36, 39-35
Pts: Thornton - 21; Rebs: Tied - 4 Asts: Tied - 4 Britt - 16 Pts	Pts: Benimon - 18; Rebs: Tied - 5 Asts: Damas - 3 Burwell - 17 Pts

Baltimore Arena
Baltimore, MD
Attendance: 4,051
Referees: William Covington, Tim Comer, Ted Nestor

=== Championship ===
NBCSN

March 10
7:00 pm

Recap

#3 William & Mary 74, #1 Delaware 75
Scoring by half: 33-39, 41-36
Pts: Thornton - 22; Rebs: Tarpey - 8 Asts: Tied - 4 Rusthoven - 16 Pts, 3 Blks	Pts: Baptiste - 24; Rebs: Usher - 10; Asts: Tied - 5 Threatt - 18 Pts, 7 Rebs

Baltimore Arena
Baltimore, MD
Attendance: 5,414
Referees: Roger Ayers, Les Jones, Jamie Luckie
