= 2013–14 Hofstra Pride men's basketball team =

American college basketball season

2013–14 Hofstra Pride men's basketball
- Conference: Colonial Athletic Association
- Record: 10–23 (5–11 CAA)
- Head coach: Joe Mihalich (1st season)
- Assistant coaches: Mike Farrelly; Shane Nichols; Speedy Claxton; Colin Curtin
- Home arena: Mack Sports Complex

2013–14 CAA men's basketball standings
	Conf.				Overall
Team	W		L	PCT	W		L	PCT
Delaware †	14	–	2	.875	25	–	10	.714
Towson	13	–	3	.813	25	–	11	.694
William & Mary	10	–	6	.625	20	–	12	.625
Drexel	8	–	8	.500	16	–	14	.533
Northeastern	7	–	9	.438	11	–	21	.344
College of Charleston	6	–	10	.375	14	–	18	.438
James Madison	6	–	10	.375	11	–	20	.355
Hofstra	5	–	11	.313	10	–	23	.303
UNC Wilmington	3	–	13	.188	9	–	23	.281
† 2014 CAA tournament winner Rankings from AP poll

The 2013–14 Hofstra Pride men's basketball team represented Hofstra University during the 2013–14 NCAA Division I men's basketball season. The Pride, led by first year head coach Joe Mihalich, played their home games at Mack Sports Complex and were members of the Colonial Athletic Association. They finished the season 10–23, 5–11 in CAA play to finish in eighth place. They advanced to the quarterfinals of the CAA tournament where they lost to Delaware.

== Roster ==
Number	Name	Position	Height	Weight	Year	Hometown
0	Jordan Allen	Forward	6–6	200	Sophomore	Bay Shore, New York
1	Juan'ya Green	Guard	6–3	195	Junior	Philadelphia, Pennsylvania
2	Ameen Tanksley	Guard	6–6	200	Junior	Philadelphia, Pennsylvania
3	Zeke Upshaw	Guard	6-6	215	Graduate	Chicago, Illinois
4	Chris Jenkins	Guard	6–4	215	Freshman	Hillside, New Jersey
11	Dion Nesmith	Guard	6–0	200	Graduate	Union, New Jersey
12	Darren Payen	Forward	6–8	205	Sophomore	Milford, Connecticut
14	Brian Bernardi	Guard	6–2	180	Sophomore	Staten Island, New York
15	Adam Savion	Guard	6–2	185	Sophomore	Hackensack, New Jersey
20	Jamall Robinson	Guard	6–5	210	Freshman	Cheltenham, Maryland
24	Stephen Nwaukoni	Forward	6–8	240	Senior	Queens, New York
30	Eliel Gonzalez	Guard	6–3	200	Freshman	Cayey, Puerto Rico
31	Moussa Kone	Forward	6–7	220	Sophomore	Bronx, New York

== Schedule ==
Date time, TV	Opponent	Result	Record	Site (attendance) city, state
Regular season
11/08/2013*; 7:00 pm	Monmouth	L 84–88	0–1	Mack Sports Complex (2,063); Hempstead, NY
11/10/2013*; 4:00 pm	Fairleigh Dickinson	W 80–58	1–1	Mack Sports Complex (1,384); Hempstead, NY
11/12/2013*; 7:00 pm, ESPN3	at No. 3 Louisville; Hall of Fame Tip Off	L 69–97	1–2	KFC Yum! Center (20,112); Louisville, KY
11/19/2013*; 7:00 pm	at Richmond; Hall of Fame Tip Off	L 63–74	1–3	Robins Center (4,109); Richmond, VA
11/23/2013*; 5:30 pm	vs. Hartford; Hall of Fame Tip Off	W 81–78	2–3	Mohegan Sun Arena (2,073); Uncasville, CT
11/24/2013*; 8:30 pm	vs. Belmont; Hall of Fame Tip Off	L 75–85	2–4	Mohegan Sun Arena (1,506); Uncasville, CT
11/30/2013*; 4:00 pm	Manhattan	L 59–66	2–5	Mack Sports Complex (1,658); Hempstead, NY
12/04/2013*; 7:00 pm	Sacred Heart	L 59–73	2–6	Mack Sports Complex (1,128); Hempstead, NY
12/15/2013*; 1:00 pm	Central Connecticut	W 72–67	3–6	Mack Sports Complex (1,458); Hempstead, NY
12/23/2013*; 7:00 pm	at Siena	L 59–67	3–7	Times Union Center (5,941); Albany, NY
12/28/2013*; 4:00 pm	George Washington	L 58–69	3–8	Mack Sports Complex (1,869); Hempstead, NY
12/30/2013*; 7:00 pm	NJIT	W 75–64	4–8	Mack Sports Complex (856); Hempstead, NY
01/02/2014*; 2:00 pm	at Tulane	L 58–61	4–9	Devlin Fieldhouse (1,391); New Orleans, LA
01/05/2014*; 4:00 pm	at Fairleigh Dickinson	L 67–86	4–10	Rothman Center (623); Hackensack, NJ
01/08/2014; 7:00 pm	at Delaware	L 79–86	4–11 (0–1)	Bob Carpenter Center (1,842); Newark, DE
01/11/2014; 4:00 pm	College of Charleston	W 75–71	5–11 (1–1)	Mack Sports Complex (1,628); Hempstead, NY
01/15/2014; 7:00 pm	at UNC Wilmington	W 69–64	6–11 (2–1)	Trask Coliseum (3,108); Wilmington, NC
01/18/2014*; 7:00 pm	at SMU; Postponed from 12/07/2013	L 49–73	6–12	Moody Coliseum (6,013); University Park, TX
01/22/2014; 7:00 pm	William and Mary	W 77–60	7–12 (3–1)	Mack Sports Complex (748); Hempstead, NY
01/25/2014; 4:00 pm	Northeastern	L 57–70	7–13 (3–2)	Mack Sports Complex (1,452); Hempstead, NY
01/27/2014; 7:00 pm, SNY	at Towson	L 58–76	7–14 (3–3)	Tiger Arena (2,328); Towson, MD
01/29/2014; 7:00 pm	Drexel	L 74–77	7–15 (3–4)	Mack Sports Complex (778); Hempstead, NY
02/01/2014; 4:00 pm	at College of Charleston	L 49–67	7–16 (3–5)	TD Arena (3,131); Charleston, SC
02/05/2014; 7:00 pm	at Northeastern	L 73–81	7–17 (3–6)	Matthews Arena (646); Boston, MA
02/08/2014; 7:00 pm	UNC Wilmington	W 61–52	8–17 (4–6)	Mack Sports Complex (2,159); Hempstead, NY
02/10/2014; 7:00 pm, SNY	at James Madison	L 53–59	8–18 (4–7)	JMU Convocation Center (3,160); Harrisonburg, VA
02/16/2014; 8:00 pm, SNY	at Drexel	L 63–74	8–19 (4–8)	Daskalakis Athletic Center (1,184); Philadelphia, PA
02/19/2014; 7:00 pm	Delaware	L 77–81	8–20 (4–9)	Mack Sports Complex (1,293); Hempstead, NY
02/22/2014; 4:00 pm	Towson	L 77–83	8–21 (4–10)	Mack Sports Complex (1,731); Hempstead, NY
02/26/2014; 7:00 pm	at William and Mary	L 74–79	8–22 (4–11)	Kaplan Arena (2,284); Williamsburg, VA
03/01/2014; 7:00 pm	James Madison	W 82–71	9–22 (5–11)	Mack Sports Complex (1,818); Hempstead, NY
2014 CAA tournament
03/07/2014; 7:00 pm, CAA.tv	vs. UNC Wilmington; First round	W 78–70	10–22	Baltimore Arena (1,705); Baltimore, MD
03/08/2014; 12:00 pm, CSN	vs. Delaware; Quarterfinals	L 76–87	10–23	Baltimore Arena (2,998); Baltimore, MD
*Non-conference game. ^{#}Rankings from AP Poll. (#) Tournament seedings in parentheses. All times are in Eastern Time.
