= 2013–14 Charleston Cougars men's basketball team =

American college basketball season

2013–14 Charleston Cougars men's basketball
- Conference: Colonial Athletic Association
- Record: 14–18 (6–10 CAA)
- Head coach: Doug Wojcik (2nd season)
- Assistant coaches: Amir Abdur-Rahim (2nd season); Ryan Freeburg; Joe Wallace
- Home arena: TD Arena

2013–14 CAA men's basketball standings
	Conf.				Overall
Team	W		L	PCT	W		L	PCT
Delaware †	14	–	2	.875	25	–	10	.714
Towson	13	–	3	.813	25	–	11	.694
William & Mary	10	–	6	.625	20	–	12	.625
Drexel	8	–	8	.500	16	–	14	.533
Northeastern	7	–	9	.438	11	–	21	.344
College of Charleston	6	–	10	.375	14	–	18	.438
James Madison	6	–	10	.375	11	–	20	.355
Hofstra	5	–	11	.313	10	–	23	.303
UNC Wilmington	3	–	13	.188	9	–	23	.281
† 2014 CAA tournament winner Rankings from AP poll

The 2013–14 College of Charleston Cougars men's basketball team represented the College of Charleston during the 2013–14 NCAA Division I men's basketball season. The Cougars, led by second year head coach Doug Wojcik, played their home games at the TD Arena and were first year members of the Colonial Athletic Association. They finished the season 14–18, 6–10 in CAA play to finish in a tie for sixth place. They lost in the quarterfinals of the CAA tournament to William & Mary.

== Roster ==
Number	Name	Position	Height	Weight	Year	Hometown
1	Adjehi Baru	Forward/Center	6–9	225	Junior	Abidjan, Ivory Coast
2	Johnathan Burroughs-Cook	Guard	6–1	175	Freshman	Memphis, Tennessee
3	Anthony Thomas	Forward	6–7	207	Senior	Winston-Salem, North Carolina
5	Glen Pierre, Jr.	Forward/Center	6–11	210	Freshman	Orlando, Florida
10	Pat Branin	Guard	6–1	190	Junior	Richmond, Virginia
11	Nori Johnson	Guard/Forward	6–5	209	Senior	Greer, South Carolina
13	Joe Chealey	Guard	6–3	180	Freshman	Orlando, Florida
14	Theo Johnson	Guard/Forward	6–6	195	Sophomore	Sacramento, California
15	Terrance O'Donohue	Forward	6–7	225	Freshman	Norcross, Georgia
20	Chad Cooke	Guard	6–0	175	Sophomore	Bolingbrook, Illinois
22	Anthony Stitt	Guard	6–1	180	Junior	Charlotte, North Carolina
24	Canyon Barry	Guard	6–6	195	RS–Freshman	Colorado Springs, Colorado
31	Harrison Bowne	Forward	6–6	230	Sophomore	Hickory, North Carolina
33	David Wishon	Center	7–2	265	RS–Sophomore	Concord, North Carolina
41	Judson Hall	Forward	6–6	200	Senior	Charlotte, North Carolina
53	Willis Hall	Forward	6–6	235	RS–Senior	Charlotte, North Carolina

== Schedule ==
Date time, TV	Opponent	Result	Record	Site (attendance) city, state
Exhibition
11/02/2013*; 7:00 pm	Newberry	W 102–87		TD Arena (N/A); Charleston, SC
Regular season
11/09/2013*; 1:00 pm, ESPN3	at No. 3 Louisville	L 48–70	0–1	KFC Yum! Center (20,938); Louisville, KY
11/12/2013*; 7:00 pm	Charlotte	W 83–82	1–1	TD Arena (3,752); Charleston, SC
11/15/2013*; 7:30 pm, WBTW	UNC Asheville	L 58–67 ^{OT}	1–2	TD Arena (4,120); Charleston, SC
11/18/2013*; 7:30 pm, WBTW	Miami (FL)	L 54–70	1–3	TD Arena (4,018); Charleston, SC
11/23/2013*; 6:00 pm	Furman	W 89–55	2–3	TD Arena (3,223); Charleston, SC
11/28/2013*; 8:30 pm, ESPNU	vs. San Diego State; Wooden Legacy First Round	L 52–72	2–4	Titan Gym (1,865); Fullerton, CA
11/29/2013*; 12:00 am, ESPNU	vs. Arizona State; Wooden Legacy Consolation 2nd Round	L 58–80	2–5	Titan Gym (3,287); Fullerton, CA
12/01/2013*; 4:30 pm, ESPNU	vs. Cal State Fullerton; The Wooden Legacy 7th Place Game	W 61–48	3–5	Honda Center (N/A); Anaheim, CA
12/12/2013*; 7:00 pm	Coker	W 68–54	4–5	TD Arena (1,812); Charleston, SC
12/15/2013*; 2:00 pm, WBTW	Marist	L 62–69	4–6	TD Arena (1,770); Charleston, SC
12/18/2013*; 7:00 pm	at Old Dominion	W 51–44	5–6	Ted Constant Convocation Center (5,304); Norfolk, VA
12/21/2013*; 3:00 pm, WBTW	Kent State	L 54–58	5–7	TD Arena (2,361); Charleston, SC
12/29/2013*; 2:00 pm	at The Citadel	W 72–48	6–7	McAlister Field House (2,803); Charleston, SC
01/01/2014*; 2:00 pm, WBTW	at Davidson	W 76–64	7–7	John M. Belk Arena (3,816); Davidson, NC
01/04/2014*; 4:00 pm, WBTW	Howard	W 60–50	8–7	TD Arena (3,783); Charleston, SC
01/07/2014; 7:00 pm	James Madison	W 75–61	9–7 (1–0)	TD Arena (4,163); Charleston, SC
01/11/2014; 4:00 pm	at Hofstra	L 71–75	9–8 (1–1)	Mack Sports Complex (1,628); Hempstead, NY
01/13/2014; 7:00 pm, NBCSN	at Northeastern	W 58–49	10–8 (2–1)	Matthews Arena (1,217); Boston, MA
01/19/2014; 3:30 pm, NBCSN	Towson	L 57–72	10–9 (2–2)	TD Arena (3,219); Charleston, SC
01/22/2014; 7:00 pm	UNC Wilmington	W 75–70	11–9 (3–2)	TD Arena (2,748); Charleston, SC
01/25/2014; 2:00 pm, CSNMA	at James Madison	L 56–58	11–10 (3–3)	JMU Convocation Center (3,987); Harrisonburg, VA
01/27/2014; 7:00 pm	at William & Mary	L 63–74	11–11 (3–4)	Kaplan Arena (2,730); Williamsburg, VA
02/01/2014; 4:00 pm	Hofstra	W 67–49	12–11 (4–4)	TD Arena (3,131); Charleston, SC
02/05/2014; 7:00 pm	at Delaware	L 64–67	12–12 (4–5)	Bob Carpenter Center (2,403); Newark, DE
02/08/2014; 2:00 pm, CSNMA	at Towson	L 61–68 ^{OT}	12–13 (4–6)	SECU Arena (3,139); Towson, MD
02/13/2014; 7:00 pm, NBCSN	Drexel	W 47–46	13–13 (5–6)	TD Arena (3,613); Charleston, SC
02/15/2014; 7:00 pm, WBTW	Northeastern	L 44–60	13–14 (5–7)	TD Arena (2,515); Charleston, SC
02/19/2014; 7:00 pm	William & Mary	W 87–54	14–14 (6–7)	TD Arena (2,654); Charleston, SC
02/22/2014; 7:00 pm, WBTW	at UNC Wilmington	L 55–57 ^{2OT}	14–15 (6–8)	Trask Coliseum (4,047); Wilmington, NC
02/26/2014; 7:00 pm	at Drexel	L 45–56	14–16 (6–9)	Daskalakis Athletic Center (2,016); Philadelphia, PA
03/01/2014; 2:00 pm, CSNMA	Delaware	L 86–89	14–17 (6–10)	TD Arena (2,631); Charleston, SC
2014 CAA tournament
03/08/2014; 8:30 pm, CSN	vs. (3) William & Mary; Quarterfinals	L 59–70	14–18	Baltimore Arena (4,897); Baltimore, MD
*Non-conference game. ^{#}Rankings from AP Poll. (#) Tournament seedings in parentheses. All times are in Eastern Time.
