= 2013–14 UNC Wilmington Seahawks men's basketball team =

American college basketball season

2013–14 UNC Wilmington Seahawks men's basketball
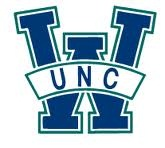
- Conference: Colonial Athletic Association
- Record: 9–23 (3–13 CAA)
- Head coach: Buzz Peterson (4th season)
- Assistant coaches: Eddie Biedenbach; Houston Fancher; Andre Gray
- Home arena: Trask Coliseum

2013–14 CAA men's basketball standings
	Conf.				Overall
Team	W		L	PCT	W		L	PCT
Delaware †	14	–	2	.875	25	–	10	.714
Towson	13	–	3	.813	25	–	11	.694
William & Mary	10	–	6	.625	20	–	12	.625
Drexel	8	–	8	.500	16	–	14	.533
Northeastern	7	–	9	.438	11	–	21	.344
College of Charleston	6	–	10	.375	14	–	18	.438
James Madison	6	–	10	.375	11	–	20	.355
Hofstra	5	–	11	.313	10	–	23	.303
UNC Wilmington	3	–	13	.188	9	–	23	.281
† 2014 CAA tournament winner Rankings from AP poll

The 2013–14 UNC Wilmington Seahawks men's basketball team represented the University of North Carolina Wilmington during the 2013–14 NCAA Division I men's basketball season. The Seahawks, led by fourth year head coach Buzz Peterson, played their home games at the Trask Coliseum and were members of the Colonial Athletic Association. They finished the season 9–23, 3–13 in CAA play to finish in last place. They lost in the first round of the CAA tournament to Hofstra.

On March 11, UNCW fired head coach Buzz Peterson after a four year record of 42–80.

== Roster ==
Number	Name	Position	Height	Weight	Year	Hometown
0	Craig Ponder	Guard	6–1	185	RS–Sophomore	Bluefield, West Virginia
1	Chris Dixon	Guard	6–0	190	Senior	Montgomery, Alabama
3	Yemi Makanjuola	Center	6–8	250	Junior	Lagos, Nigeria
5	Ben Eblen	Guard	6–1	185	Senior	Isle of Palms, South Carolina
10	Freddie Jackson	Guard	6–4	185	Junior	Wilmington, North Carolina
12	Tanner Milson	Guard	6–2	190	Senior	Cedar Hill, Texas
13	Chuck Ogbodo	Forward	6–9	230	Freshman	Enugu, Nigeria
15	Luke Hager	Forward	6–8	205	RS–Sophomore	Chicago, Illinois
20	Dylan Sherwood	Forward	6–9	218	RS–Sophomore	Pittsford, New York
22	Nate Anderson	Forward	6–9	235	Junior	Ashville, Ohio
23	C.J. Gettys	Center	7–0	285	RS–Freshman	Findlay, Ohio
24	Addison Spruill	Guard	6–4	225	Junior	Currie, North Carolina
30	Zack Allen	Guard	5–11	190	Senior	Wilmington, North Carolina
33	Shane Reybold	Forward	6–8	238	Senior	Laurel, Maryland
34	Marcus Graham	Guard	6–6	178	Senior	Roseboro, North Carolina
40	Cedrick Williams	Forward	6–9	225	Junior	Murfreesboro, Tennessee

== Schedule ==
Date time, TV	Opponent	Result	Record	Site (attendance) city, state
Exhibition
10/30/2013*; 7:00 pm	Belmont Abbey	W 101–51		Trask Coliseum (2,381); Wilmington, NC
11/03/2013*; 2:00 pm	Methodist	W 92–51		Trask Coliseum (2,517); Wilmington, NC
Regular season
11/03/2013*; 9:30 pm, ESPN3	at Iowa	L 39–82	0–1	Carver–Hawkeye Arena (15,293); Iowa City, IA
11/10/2013*; 1:00 pm	at Iowa State	L 62–95	0–2	Hilton Coliseum (14,384); Ames, IA
11/13/2013*; 7:30 pm	at Charleston Southern	W 80–78 ^{OT}	1–2	CSU Field House (954); Charleston, SC
11/16/2013*; 7:00 pm	Wingate	W 80–61	2–2	Trask Coliseum (3,531); Wilmington, NC
11/18/2013*; 7:00 pm	at Liberty	W 87–76	3–2	Vines Center (1,731); Lynchburg, VA
11/21/2013*; 8:00 pm	at WKU	L 58–73	3–3	E. A. Diddle Arena (3,837); Bowling Green, KY
11/23/2013*; 7:00 pm	at Marshall	L 78–96	3–4	Cam Henderson Center (4,718); Huntington, WV
11/26/2013*; 7:00 pm	Campbellsville	W 72–55	4–4	Trask Coliseum (3,113); Wilmington, NC
11/29/2013*; 7:00 pm	Stephen F. Austin	L 55–60	4–5	Trask Coliseum (3,347); Wilmington, NC
12/01/2013*; 5:00 pm	at East Carolina	W 70–68	5–5	Williams Arena (3,992); Greenville, NC
12/03/2013*; 7:00 pm	Campbell	W 69–50	6–5	Trask Coliseum (3,007); Wilmington, NC
12/15/2013*; 2:00 pm	Manhattan	L 72–77	6–6	Trask Coliseum (3,411); Wilmington, NC
12/21/2013*; 2:00 pm	Old Dominion	L 57–69	6–7	Trask Coliseum (3,027); Wilmington, NC
12/28/2013*; 4:30 pm	at UNC Asheville	L 61–75	6–8	Kimmel Arena (2,134); Asheville, NC
12/31/2013*; 5:00 pm, ESPNU	at No. 19 North Carolina	L 51–84	6–9	Dean Smith Center (16,923); Chapel Hill, NC
01/04/2014; 7:00 pm	James Madison	L 55–60	6–10 (0–1)	Trask Coliseum (3,877); Wilmington, NC
01/08/2014; 7:00 pm	at Northeastern	L 68–79 ^{OT}	6–11 (0–2)	Matthews Arena (1,002); Boston, MA
01/11/2014; 2:00 pm	at Towson	L 53–60	6–12 (0–3)	SECU Arena (1,750); Towson, MD
01/15/2014; 7:00 pm	Hofstra	L 64–69	6–13 (0–4)	Trask Coliseum (3,108); Wilmington, NC
01/18/2014; 2:00 pm	Drexel	L 63–79	6–14 (0–5)	Trask Coliseum (3,614); Wilmington, NC
01/22/2014; 7:00 pm	at College of Charleston	L 70–75	6–15 (0–6)	TD Arena (2,748); Charleston, SC
02/01/2014; 12:00 pm	at Delaware	L 65–66	6–16 (0–7)	Bob Carpenter Center (2,584); Newark, DE
02/03/2014; 7:00 pm	at Drexel	L 50–61	6–17 (0–8)	Daskalakis Athletic Center (917); Philadelphia, PA
02/05/2014; 7:00 pm	William & Mary	L 50–54	6–18 (0–9)	Trask Coliseum (3,030); Wilmington, NC
02/08/2014; 7:00 pm	at Hofstra	L 52–61	6–19 (0–10)	Mack Sports Complex (2,159); Hempstead, NY
02/10/2014; 7:00 pm	Towson game postponed from 01/29/2014	W 66–53	7–19 (1–10)	Trask Coliseum (2,451); Wilmington, NC
02/13/2014; 7:00 pm	Northeastern game postponed from 02/12/2014	W 55–45	8–19 (2–10)	Trask Coliseum (2,919); Wilmington, NC
02/15/2014; 12:00 pm	at James Madison	L 62–64	8–20 (2–11)	JMU Convocation Center (3,262); Harrisonburg, VA
02/17/2014; 7:00 pm	at William & Mary	L 70–93	8–21 (2–12)	Kaplan Arena (2,606); Williamsburg, VA
02/22/2014; 7:00 pm	College of Charleston	W 57–55 ^{2OT}	9–21 (3–12)	Trask Coliseum (4,047); Wilmington, NC
02/26/2014; 7:00 pm	Delaware	L 57–70	9–22 (3–13)	Trask Coliseum (3,338); Wilmington, NC
2014 CAA tournament
03/07/2014; 7:00 pm, CAA.tv	vs. Hofstra; First round	L 70–78	9–23	Baltimore Arena (1,705); Baltimore, MD
*Non-conference game. ^{#}Rankings from AP Poll. (#) Tournament seedings in parentheses. All times are in Eastern Time.
