= 2013–14 Northeastern Huskies men's basketball team =

American college basketball season

2013–14 Northeastern Huskies men's basketball
- Conference: Colonial Athletic Association
- Record: 11–21 (7–9 CAA)
- Head coach: Bill Coen (8th season)
- Assistant coaches: David McLaughlin; Antonio Reynolds-Dean; Brian McDonald
- Home arena: Matthews Arena

2013–14 CAA men's basketball standings
	Conf.				Overall
Team	W		L	PCT	W		L	PCT
Delaware †	14	–	2	.875	25	–	10	.714
Towson	13	–	3	.813	25	–	11	.694
William & Mary	10	–	6	.625	20	–	12	.625
Drexel	8	–	8	.500	16	–	14	.533
Northeastern	7	–	9	.438	11	–	21	.344
College of Charleston	6	–	10	.375	14	–	18	.438
James Madison	6	–	10	.375	11	–	20	.355
Hofstra	5	–	11	.313	10	–	23	.303
UNC Wilmington	3	–	13	.188	9	–	23	.281
† 2014 CAA tournament winner Rankings from AP poll

The 2013–14 Northeastern Huskies men's basketball team represented Northeastern University during the 2013–14 NCAA Division I men's basketball season. The Huskies, led by eighth-year head coach Bill Coen, played their home games at Matthews Arena and were members of the Colonial Athletic Association. They finished the season 11–21, 7–9 in CAA play to finish in fifth place. They advanced to the semifinals of the CAA tournament, where they lost to Delaware.

== Roster ==
Number	Name	Position	Height	Weight	Year	Hometown
1	Chris Avenant	Guard	6–4	193	RS senior	Sacramento, California
2	Demetrius Pollard	Guard	6–2	200	Junior	Virginia Beach, Virginia
3	Jimmy Marshall	Guard/forward	6–7	185	Freshman	Richmond, Virginia
4	David Walker	Guard	6–6	176	Sophomore	Stow, Ohio
11	Marcos Benegas-Flores	Guard	6–1	190	Junior	Boston
12	Quincy Ford	Guard/forward	6–8	212	Sophomore	St. Petersburg, Florida
15	Caleb Donnelly	Guard	6–1	180	Junior	Hudson, New Hampshire
22	C.J. Hill	Guard	6–2	180	Freshman	Centreville, Virginia
24	Derrico Peck	Forward	6–5	204	Sophomore	Woodstock, Georgia
33	Zach Stahl	Guard	6–5	201	Sophomore	Chanhassen, Minnesota
34	Kwesi Abakah	Forward	6–8	193	RS freshman	Suwanee, Georgia
43	Scott Eatherton	Forward	6–8	219	RS junior	Hershey, Pennsylvania
44	Reggie Spencer	Forward	6–7	210	Junior	Tuscaloosa, Alabama

== Schedule ==
Date time, TV	Opponent	Result	Record	Site (attendance) city, state
Regular season
11/10/2013*; 12:30 pm, NESN	vs. Boston University; Coaches vs. Cancer Boston Tip-Off	L 69–72	0–1	TD Garden (6,037); Boston
11/13/2013*; 7:00 pm	at Stony Brook	L 66–73	0–2	Pritchard Gymnasium (1,266); Stony Brook, New York
11/16/2013*; 4:00 pm	Central Connecticut	W 83–69	1–2	Cabot Center (1,434); Boston
11/21/2013*; 1:10 pm, ESPNU	vs. Georgetown; Puerto Rico Tip-Off First Round	W 63–56	2–2	Roberto Clemente Coliseum (430); San Juan, PR
11/22/2013*; 2:30 pm, ESPN2	vs. Charlotte; Puerto Rico Tip-Off semifinals	L 77–86	2–3	Roberto Clemente Coliseum (N/A); San Juan, PR
11/24/2013*; 4:30 pm, ESPN2	vs. Florida State; Puerto Rico Tip-Off 3rd place game	L 60–62	2–4	Roberto Clemente Coliseum (N/A); San Juan, PR
11/29/2013*; 7:00 pm	at VCU	L 66–79	2–5	Stuart C. Siegel Center (7,741); Richmond, Virginia
12/04/2013*; 7:00 pm	Harvard	L 64–72	2–6	Matthews Arena (1,901); Boston
12/07/2013*; 7:00 pm	UAB	L 69–74	2–7	Matthews Arena (1,482); Boston
12/15/2013*; 1:00 pm	at Fairfield	L 60–64	2–8	Webster Bank Arena (1,106); Bridgeport, Connecticut
12/21/2013*; 5:25 pm	vs. Milwaukee; Tulane Classic	W 62–59	3–8	Devlin Fieldhouse (2,001); New Orleans
12/22/2013*; 6:00 pm	at Tulane; Tulane Classic	L 62–65	3–9	Devlin Fieldhouse (2,111); New Orleans
12/31/2013*; 2:00 pm	Richmond	L 66–70	3–10	Matthews Arena (957); Boston
01/04/2014*; 7:00 pm	at Vanderbilt	L 49–79	3–11	Memorial Gymnasium (8,438); Nashville, Tennessee
01/08/2014; 7:00 pm	UNC Wilmington	W 79–68 ^{OT}	4–11 (1–0)	Matthews Arena (1,002); Boston
01/11/2014; 7:00 pm, CSNNE	at Drexel	L 88–93 ^{2OT}	4–12 (1–1)	Daskalakis Athletic Center (2,509); Philadelphia
01/13/2014; 7:00 pm, NBCSN	College of Charleston	L 49–58	4–13 (1–2)	Matthews Arena (1,217); Boston
01/15/2014; 7:00 pm	at James Madison	W 56–52	5–13 (2–2)	JMU Convocation Center (3,610); Harrisonburg, Virginia
01/18/2014; 7:00 pm, CSNNE	Delaware	L 70–74	5–14 (2–3)	Matthews Arena (1,082); Boston
01/22/2014; 7:00 pm	at Towson	W 57–54	6–14 (3–3)	Tiger Arena (1,177); Towson, Maryland
01/25/2014; 4:00 pm	at Hofstra	W 70–57	7–14 (4–3)	Mack Sports Complex (1,452); Hempstead, New York
01/29/2014; 7:00 pm	James Madison	L 46–49	7–15 (4–4)	Matthews Arena (911); Boston
02/03/2014; 7:00 pm	at Delaware	L 67–80	7–16 (4–5)	Bob Carpenter Center (1,965); Newark, Delaware
02/05/2014; 7:00 pm	Hofstra	W 81–73	8–16 (5–5)	Matthews Arena (646); Boston
02/08/2014; 7:00 pm	William & Mary	L 70–82	8–17 (5–6)	Matthews Arena (1,309); Boston
02/13/2014; 7:00 pm	at UNC Wilmington; Postponed from 2/12/2014	L 45–55	8–18 (5–7)	Trask Coliseum (2,919); Wilmington, North Carolina
02/15/2014; 7:00 pm	at College of Charleston	W 60–44	9–18 (6–7)	TD Arena (2,515); Charleston, South Carolina
02/20/2014; 7:00 pm, CSNNE	Towson	L 70–79	9–19 (6–8)	Matthews Arena (1,026); Boston
02/22/2014; 4:00 pm, CSNNE	William & Mary	L 67–81	9–20 (6–9)	Kaplan Arena (3,112); Williamsburg, Virginia
03/01/2014; 1:00 pm	Drexel	W 54–52	10–20 (7–9)	Matthews Arena (1,123); Boston
2014 CAA tournament
03/08/2014; 2:30 pm, CSN	vs. Drexel; Quarterfinals	W 90–81	11–20	Baltimore Arena (2,998); Baltimore
03/09/2014; 2:30 pm, NBCSN	vs. Delaware; Semifinals	L 74–87	11–21	Baltimore Arena (4,051); Baltimore
*Non-conference game. ^{#}Rankings from AP Poll. (#) Tournament seedings in parentheses. All times are in Eastern Time.
