= 2013–14 Old Dominion Monarchs men's basketball team =

American college basketball season

2013–14 Old Dominion Monarchs men's basketball

CBI Semifinals vs. Fresno State, L 64–71
- Conference: Conference USA
- Record: 18–18 (9–7 C-USA)
- Head coach: Jeff Jones (1st season)
- Assistant coaches: Lamar Barrett (1st season); John Richardson (7th season); Bryant Stith (1st season)
- MVP: Aaron Bacote
- Captains: Aaron Bacote; Keenan Palmore
- Home arena: Ted Constant Convocation Center

2013–14 Conference USA men's basketball standings
	Conf.				Overall
Team	W		L	PCT	W		L	PCT
Louisiana Tech	13	–	3	.813	29	–	8	.784
Tulsa †	13	–	3	.813	21	–	13	.618
Middle Tennessee	13	–	3	.813	24	–	9	.727
Southern Miss	13	–	3	.813	29	–	7	.806
UTEP	12	–	4	.750	23	–	11	.676
Old Dominion	9	–	7	.563	18	–	18	.500
Tulane	8	–	8	.500	17	–	17	.500
UAB	7	–	9	.438	18	–	13	.581
Charlotte	7	–	9	.438	17	–	14	.548
FIU*	7	–	9	.438	15	–	16	.484
North Texas	6	–	10	.375	16	–	16	.500
Florida Atlantic	5	–	11	.313	10	–	22	.313
East Carolina	5	–	11	.313	17	–	17	.500
UTSA	4	–	12	.250	8	–	22	.267
Marshall	4	–	12	.250	11	–	22	.333
Rice	2	–	14	.125	7	–	23	.233
† 2014 C-USA Tournament winner Rankings from AP poll *Ineligible for postseason play due to APR penalties

The 2013–14 Old Dominion Monarchs men's basketball team represented Old Dominion University during the 2013–14 NCAA Division I men's basketball season. The Monarchs, led by first year head coach Jeff Jones, played their home games at Ted Constant Convocation Center and were first year members of the Conference USA. They finished the season 18–18, 9–7 in C-USA play to finish in sixth place. They advanced to the quarterfinals of the C-USA tournament to Middle Tennessee. They were invited to the College Basketball Invitational where they defeated South Dakota State and Radford to advance to the semifinals where they lost to Fresno State.

== Pre-season ==
=== Departures ===
Name	Number	Pos.	Height	Weight	Year	Hometown	Notes
Ekene Anachebe	12	C	6'9"	265	Freshman	Fayetteville, Georgia	Transferred to Southwestern Illinois College
Stuart McEwen	21	F	6'9"	201	Freshman	Sydney, Australia	Transferred to Stonehill College
DeShawn Painter	11	C	6'9"	235	Senior	Norfolk, Virginia	Graduated
Nick Wright	1	F	6'8"	208	Senior	Suffolk, Virginia	Graduated

=== Incoming transfers ===
Name	Number	Pos.	Height	Weight	Year	Hometown	Previous School
Trey Freeman	20	G	6'2"	175	Junior	Virginia Beach, VA	Transferred from Campbell. Under NCAA transfer rules, Freeman will have to redshirt for the 2013–14 season. Will have two years of remaining eligibility.
Nik Biberaj	30	F	6'8"	235	Junior	Fairfax Station, VA	Transferred from Christopher Newport University. Under NCAA transfer rules, Biberaj will have to redshirt for the 2013–14 season. Will have two years of remaining eligibility.

=== Incoming recruits ===
College recruiting
Name	Hometown	School	Height	Weight	Commit date
Jordan Baker; SG	Hampton, Va	Hampton High School	6 ft 2 in (1.88 m)	195 lb (88 kg)	Jul 3, 2012
Jordan Baker; SG	Recruit ratings: Scout: Rivals: 247Sports: (63)				
Denzell Taylor; PF	Brampton, Ontario	Saint Benedict's Prep	6 ft 7 in (2.01 m)	215 lb (98 kg)	Nov 6, 2012
Denzell Taylor; PF	Recruit ratings: Scout: Rivals: 247Sports: (65)				
Overall recruit ranking:
Note: In many cases, Scout, Rivals, 247Sports, On3, and ESPN may conflict in their listings of height and weight.; In these cases, the average was taken. ESPN grades are on a 100-point scale.; Sources: "2013 Team Ranking". Rivals.

== Roster ==
2013–14 Old Dominion Monarchs men's basketball team
Players
Coaches

Pos.	#	Name	Height	Weight	Year	Previous school	Hometown
G	0	Jordan Baker	6 ft 2 in (1.88 m)	195 lb (88 kg)	Fr	Hampton HS	Hampton, VA
G	1	Aaron Bacote (C)	6 ft 4 in (1.93 m)	180 lb (82 kg)	So	Bethel HS	Hampton, VA
G	3	Keenan Palmore (C)	6 ft 1 in (1.85 m)	180 lb (82 kg)	So	The Paideia School	Stone Mountain, GA
G	4	Dimitri Batten	6 ft 3 in (1.91 m)	205 lb (93 kg)	RS Jr	Kecoughtan HS	Newport News, VA
G	10	Martin Shaw (W)	5 ft 11 in (1.8 m)	170 lb (77 kg)	So	Kecoughtan HS	Hampton, VA
F	11	Josue Ebondo	6 ft 7 in (2.01 m)	215 lb (98 kg)	Jr	Euless Trinity HS / Garden City CC	Euless, TX
G	15	Deion Clark (injured)	6 ft 3 in (1.91 m)	210 lb (95 kg)	So	Barron Collier HS	Naples, FL
G	20	Trey Freeman (I) (redshirt)	6 ft 2 in (1.88 m)	175 lb (79 kg)	Jr	Kellam HS / Campbell	Virginia Beach, VA
F	21	Denzell Taylor	6 ft 7 in (2.01 m)	210 lb (95 kg)	Fr	St. Benedict's Prep	Brampton, ON
G	22	Ambrose Mosley	6 ft 2 in (1.88 m)	170 lb (77 kg)	RS Fr	Hargrave Military Academy	Jacksonville, FL
F	23	Richard Ross	6 ft 6 in (1.98 m)	225 lb (102 kg)	RS Jr	Hirschi HS	Wichita Falls, TX
G	25	Donte Hill (I)	6 ft 4 in (1.93 m)	205 lb (93 kg)	RS Sr	Norfolk Collegiate / Clemson	Virginia Beach, VA
G	25	Sean-Michael King (W)	6 ft 1 in (1.85 m)	182 lb (83 kg)	Jr	Hayfield HS	Alexandria, VA
F	30	Nik Biberaj (W) (redshirt)	6 ft 8 in (2.03 m)	235 lb (107 kg)	Jr	South County HS / Christopher Newport	Fairfax Station, VA
C	40	Anton Larsen	7 ft 0 in (2.13 m)	245 lb (111 kg)	RS Sr	Oster Farimagsgades	Copenhagen, DK

Head coach

- Jeff Jones (Virginia)

Assistant coach(es)

- Lamar Barrett (Elizabeth City State)
- John Richardson (Elizabeth City State)
- Bryant Stith (Virginia)

Legend

- (C) Team captain
- (S) Suspended
- (I) Ineligible
- (W) Walk-on
- Injured
- Current redshirt

Roster
Last update: 03/20/14

== Schedule ==
Date time, TV	Opponent	Result	Record	High points	High rebounds	High assists	Site (attendance) city, state
Exhibition
11/01/2013*; 7:00 pm	Elizabeth City State	W 84–50	–	23 – Bacote	12 – Ross	4 – Palmore	Constant Center (5,329); Norfolk, VA
Non-conference regular season
11/08/2013*; 7:00 pm	Missouri State	L 67–79 ^{OT}	0–1	28 – Bacote (1)	10 – Ross (1)	4 – 2 tied	Constant Center (6,780); Norfolk, VA
11/13/2013*; 7:00 pm	Howard	W 77–57	1–1	20 – Bacote (2)	12 – Ross (2)	5 – Bacote (2)	Constant Center (6,102); Norfolk, VA
11/15/2013*; 7:00 pm	Murray State	W 70–60	2–1	21 – Bacote (3)	12 – Taylor (1)	8 – Bacote (3)	Constant Center (5,770); Norfolk, VA
11/21/2013*; 7:00 pm	Presbyterian; Cancún Challenge	W 69–51	3–1	24 – Palmore (1)	7 – 2 tied	4 – Palmore (1)	Constant Center (5,699); Norfolk, VA
11/23/2013*; 3:00 pm	Georgia Southern; Cancún Challenge	W 86–69	4–1	26 – Bacote (4)	8 – Taylor (2)	6 – Bacote (4)	Constant Center (5,418); Norfolk, VA
11/26/2013*; 6:00 pm, CBSSN	vs. West Virginia; Cancún Challenge Semifinals	L 60–78	4–2	20 – Bacote (5)	9 – Bacote (2)	2 – 2 tied	Moon Palace Resort (934); Cancún, MX
11/27/2013*; 7:00 pm, CBSSN	vs. Saint Louis; Cancún Challenge 3rd place game	L 52–62	4–3	15 – Bacote (6)	9 – Ross (3)	3 – Bacote (5)	Moon Palace Resort (934); Cancún, MX
12/03/2013*; 7:00 pm	NC Central	L 69–76 ^{OT}	4–4	25 – Batten (1)	10 – Batten (1)	4 – Palmore (3)	Constant Center (5,189); Norfolk, VA
12/08/2013*; 1:30 pm, CSNMA	at VCU; Rivalry	L 48–69	4–5	13 – 2 tied	9 – Ross (4)	3 – Palmore (4)	Stuart C. Siegel Center (7,741); Richmond, VA
12/14/2013*; 2:00 pm	at Georgia State	L 73–79	4–6	21 – Bacote (8)	12 – Ross (5)	4 – Palmore (5)	GSU Sports Arena (1,477); Atlanta, GA
12/18/2013*; 7:00 pm	College of Charleston	L 44–51	4–7	13 – Bacote (9)	8 – Taylor (3)	2 – Bacote (6)	Constant Center (5,304); Norfolk, VA
12/21/2013*; 2:00 pm	at UNC Wilmington	W 69–57	5–7	17 – Ross (1)	10 – Ross (6)	3 – 2 tied	Trask Coliseum (3,027); Wilmington, NC
12/28/2013*; 6:30 pm, NBCSN	at Richmond	L 58–67	5–8	20 – Bacote (10)	11 – Taylor (4)	2 – 4 tied	Robins Center (6,512); Richmond, VA
01/01/2014*; 7:00 pm	at William & Mary; Rivalry	L 68–74	5–9	28 – Bacote (11)	6 – 2 tied	3 – Bacote (9)	Kaplan Arena (2,806); Williamsburg, VA
01/04/2014*; 7:00 pm	George Mason	W 71–66	6–9	20 – Bacote (12)	7 – 2 tied	4 – Bacote (10)	Constant Center (7,511); Norfolk, VA
Conference USA regular season
01/11/2014; 7:00 pm, COX/WITN	East Carolina	W 81–70	7–9 (1–0)	23 – Palmore (3)	6 – 2 tied	6 – Bacote (11)	Williams Arena (5,328); Greenville, NC
01/16/2014; 7:00 pm	at Florida International	W 52–36	8–9 (2–0)	17 – Palmore (4)	8 – Taylor (8)	3 – 2 tied	U.S. Century Bank Arena (1,246); Miami, FL
01/18/2014; 7:00 pm	at Florida Atlantic	W 65–60	9–9 (3–0)	15 – Palmore (5)	8 – Ross (10)	3 – Mosley (1)	FAU Arena (1,482); Boca Raton, FL
01/23/2014; 7:00 pm	Southern Miss	L 60–75	9–10 (3–1)	19 – Bacote (13)	9 – Ross (11)	4 – Baker (3)	Constant Center (7,549); Norfolk, VA
01/25/2014; 7:00 pm	Tulane	W 70–64	10–10 (4–1)	16 – Bacote (14)	8 – Taylor (9)	4 – 2 tied	Constant Center (6,512); Norfolk, VA
01/30/2014; 8:00 pm	at UAB	L 66–75	10–11 (4–2)	18 – Batten (2)	7 – 2 tied	3 – Batten (3)	Bartow Arena (2,491); Birmingham, AL
02/01/2014; 6:00 pm	at Middle Tennessee	L 48–64	10–12 (4–3)	14 – Batten (3)	8 – Taylor (10)	3 – Palmore (9)	Murphy Center (4,498); Murfreesboro, TN
02/06/2014; 7:00 pm	UTSA	W 69–61	11–12 (5–3)	22 – Bacote (15)	10 – Ross (13)	4 – Bacote (14)	Constant Center (5,320); Norfolk, VA
02/08/2014; 7:00 pm	UTEP	L 49–63	11–13 (5–4)	8 – 2 tied	7 – 2 tied	2 – Palmore (10)	Constant Center (6,273); Norfolk, VA
02/13/2014; 8:00 pm	at North Texas	W 72–62	12–13 (6–4)	21 – Mosley (2)	7 – 2 tied	5 – Palmore (11)	The Super Pit (2,335); Denton, TX
02/15/2014; 4:00 pm	at Tulsa	L 37–76	12–14 (6–5)	12 – Mosley (3)	4 – 2 tied	3 – Palmore (12)	Reynolds Center (4,609); Tulsa, OK
02/20/2014; 7:00 pm	Rice	W 55–51	13–14 (7–5)	18 – Ross (2)	10 – 2 tied	4 – Palmore (13)	Constant Center (5,409); Norfolk, VA
02/22/2014; 7:00 pm	Louisiana Tech	L 66–71	13–15 (7–6)	25 – Bacote (16)	9 – Ross (17)	5 – Bacote (15)	Constant Center (6,940); Norfolk, VA
02/27/2014; 7:00 pm	Marshall	W 70–63	14–15 (8–6)	22 – Bacote (17)	11 – Taylor (12)	4 – Bacote (16)	Constant Center (6,230); Norfolk, VA
03/02/2014; 4:00 pm	at Charlotte	L 63–74	14–16 (8–7)	17 – Bacote (18)	7 – Taylor (13)	5 – Palmore (14)	Dale F. Halton Arena (4,8,46); Charlotte, NC
03/06/2014; 7:00 pm	East Carolina	W 68–47	15–16 (9–7)	17 – Mosley (4)	8 – Ross (18)	4 – Palmore (15)	Constant Center (7,029); Norfolk, VA
Conference USA tournament
03/12/2014; 4:30 pm	vs. Marshall; Second Round	W 73–58	16–16	25 – Bacote (19)	8 – Bacote (3)	1 – 3 tied	Don Haskins Center (3,916); El Paso, TX
03/13/2014; 4:30 pm	vs. Middle Tennessee; Quarterfinals	L 48–62	16–17	13 – Mosley (5)	8 – Ross (19)	3 – Palmore (17)	Don Haskins Center (3,968); El Paso, TX
College Basketball Invitational
03/19/2014; 7:00 pm	South Dakota State; First round	W 72–65	17–17	18 – Batten (4)	7 – Palmore (4)	7 – Palmore (18)	Constant Center (1,487); Norfolk, VA
03/24/2014; 7:00 pm	Radford; Quarterfinals	W 82–59	18–17	23 – Ross (3)	10 – Ross (20)	4 – 2 tied	Constant Center (3,486); Norfolk, VA
03/26/2014; 10:00 pm	at Fresno State; Semifinals	L 64–71	18–18	14 – Batten (5)	7 – Taylor (14)	4 – Palmore (20)	Save Mart Center (3,916); Fresno, CA
*Non-conference game. (#) Tournament seedings in parentheses. All times are in Eastern Time.

== Statistics ==
The team posted the following statistics:

Name	GP	GS	Min.	Avg.	FG	FGA	FG%	3FG	3FGA	3FG%	FT	FTA	FT%	OR	DR	RB	Avg.	Ast.	Avg.	PF	DQ	TO	Stl.	Blk.	Pts.	Avg.
Aaron Bacote	35	34	1033	29.5	163	407	0.400	56	158	0.354	160	205	0.780	16	89	105	3.0	102	2.9	67	1	100	26	5	542	15.5
Dimitri Batten	36	35	981	27.3	137	361	0.380	43	150	0.287	80	128	0.625	28	123	151	4.2	41	1.1	92	1	75	40	9	397	11.0
Richard Ross	36	34	1155	32.1	149	284	0.525	0	1	0.000	60	119	0.504	92	161	253	7.0	32	0.9	87	1	54	27	81	358	9.9
Keenan Palmore	36	36	1009	28.0	141	284	0.496	0	5	0.000	76	134	0.567	43	96	139	3.9	96	2.7	88	3	86	47	8	358	9.9
Ambrose Mosley	36	1	716	19.9	86	238	0.361	58	169	0.343	31	43	0.721	18	85	103	2.9	32	0.9	73	2	26	24	1	261	7.3
Denzell Taylor	36	36	959	26.6	68	130	0.523	0	1	0.000	23	60	0.383	104	109	213	5.9	24	0.7	117	3	47	25	31	159	4.4
Jordan Baker	36	2	659	18.3	50	141	0.355	33	89	0.371	26	36	0.722	11	65	76	2.1	41	1.1	77	2	45	23	0	159	4.4
Joe Ebondo	36	0	583	16.2	20	50	0.400	0	0	0.000	11	25	0.440	55	68	123	3.4	10	0.3	87	1	23	14	4	51	1.4
Anton Larsen	18	2	124	6.9	9	23	0.391	0	8	0.000	4	6	0.667	4	17	21	1.2	2	0.1	15	0	5	0	3	22	1.2
Martin Shaw	17	0	24	1.4	2	7	0.286	0	1	0.000	0	2	0.000	0	1	1	0.1	2	0.1	5	0	2	0	0	4	0.2
Sean-Michael King	7	0	7	1.0	0	2	0.000	0	1	0.000	0	0	0.000	0	0	0	0.0	0	0.0	1	0	0	0	0	0	0.0
TEAM	36													59	38	97	2.7					11				
Season Total	36		7250		825	1927	0.428	190	583	0.326	471	758	0.621	430	852	1282	35.6	382	10.6	709	14	474	226	142	2311	64.2
Opponents	36		7250		777	1848	0.420	214	597	0.358	554	825	0.672	374	834	1208	33.6	378	10.5	686	13	458	227	143	2322	64.5
