= 2013–14 James Madison Dukes men's basketball team =

American college basketball season

2013–14 James Madison Dukes men's basketball
- Conference: Colonial Athletic Association
- Record: 11–20 (6–10 CAA)
- Head coach: Matt Brady (6th season)
- Assistant coaches: Rob O'Driscoll; Mike Deane; Bill Phillips
- Home arena: James Madison University Convocation Center

2013–14 CAA men's basketball standings
	Conf.				Overall
Team	W		L	PCT	W		L	PCT
Delaware †	14	–	2	.875	25	–	10	.714
Towson	13	–	3	.813	25	–	11	.694
William & Mary	10	–	6	.625	20	–	12	.625
Drexel	8	–	8	.500	16	–	14	.533
Northeastern	7	–	9	.438	11	–	21	.344
College of Charleston	6	–	10	.375	14	–	18	.438
James Madison	6	–	10	.375	11	–	20	.355
Hofstra	5	–	11	.313	10	–	23	.303
UNC Wilmington	3	–	13	.188	9	–	23	.281
† 2014 CAA tournament winner Rankings from AP poll

The 2013–14 James Madison Dukes men's basketball team represented James Madison University during the 2013–14 NCAA Division I men's basketball season. The Dukes, led by sixth year head coach Matt Brady, played their home games at the James Madison University Convocation Center and were members of the Colonial Athletic Association. They finished the season 11–20, 6–10 in CAA play to finish in a tie for sixth place. They lost in the quarterfinals of the CAA tournament to Towson.

== Roster ==
2013–14 James Madison Dukes men's basketball team
Players
Coaches

Pos.	#	Name	Height	Weight	Year	Hometown
G	2	Ron Curry	6 ft 4 in (1.93 m)	190 lb (86 kg)	So	Pennsauken, New Jersey
G	4	Charles Cooke	6 ft 6 in (1.98 m)	190 lb (86 kg)	So	Trenton, New Jersey
G	10	Kent Jackson	6 ft 7 in (2.01 m)	180 lb (82 kg)	Fr	High Point, North Carolina
F	11	Andrey Semenov	6 ft 7 in (2.01 m)	200 lb (91 kg)	Sr	Saint Petersburg, Russia
F	12	Paulius Satkus	6 ft 8 in (2.03 m)	205 lb (93 kg)	Fr	Raudondvaris, Lithuania
F	13	Tom Vodanovich	6 ft 8 in (2.03 m)	225 lb (102 kg)	Fr	Wellington, New Zealand
G	14	Christian Pierce	6 ft 5 in (1.96 m)	205 lb (93 kg)	RS Jr	Ivy, Virginia
G	15	Andre Nation	6 ft 5 in (1.96 m)	200 lb (91 kg)	So	Plant City, Florida
F	20	Tom Rivard	6 ft 7 in (2.01 m)	205 lb (93 kg)	Fr	Worcester, Massachusetts
F	21	Dimitrije Cabarkapa	6 ft 10 in (2.08 m)	245 lb (111 kg)	RS Fr	Novi Sad, Serbia
F	22	Taylor Bessick	6 ft 9 in (2.06 m)	230 lb (104 kg)	So	Philadelphia
G	40	Yohanny Dalembert	6 ft 8 in (2.03 m)	225 lb (102 kg)	Fr	Port-au-Prince, Haiti
F/C	55	Ivan Lukic	6 ft 8 in (2.03 m)	215 lb (98 kg)	Fr	Loznica, Serbia

Head coach

- Matt Brady (Siena)

Assistant coach(es)

- Rob O'Driscoll (Villanova)
- Mike Deane (SUNY Potsdam)
- Bill Phillips (Saint Joseph's)

Legend

- (C) Team captain
- (S) Suspended
- (I) Ineligible
- (W) Walk-on
- Injured
- Current redshirt

Roster
Last update: 2013-03-11

== Schedule ==
Date time, TV	Opponent	Result	Record	Site (attendance) city, state
Exhibition
11/03/2013*; 2:30 pm	Philadelphia	W 73–69		JMU Convocation Center; Harrisonburg, Virginia
Regular season
11/08/2013*; 7:00 pm, ESPN3	at No. 24 Virginia	L 41–61	0–1	John Paul Jones Arena (11,934); Charlottesville, Virginia
11/15/2013*; 9:00 pm	at Northern Illinois; Northern Illinois Tournament	W 60–55	1–1	Convocation Center (1,113); DeKalb, Illinois
11/16/2013*; 6:30 pm	vs. Milwaukee; Northern Illinois Tournament	L 66–77	1–2	Convocation Center (753); DeKalb, Illinois
11/17/2013*; 2:00 pm	vs. San Jose State; Northern Illinois Tournament	W 79–66	2–2	Convocation Center (474); DeKalb, Illinois
11/19/2013*; 7:00 pm	Detroit	L 67–71	2–3	JMU Convocation Center (4,030); Harrisonburg, Virginia
11/23/2013*; 3:00 pm	at Valparaiso	L 49–81	2–4	Athletics-Recreation Center (2,453); Valparaiso, IN
11/27/2013*; 7:00 pm	at Winthrop	L 57–69	2–5	Winthrop Coliseum (1,171); Rock Hill, South Carolina
11/30/2013*; 6:00 pm	at Richmond	L 53–68	2–6	Robins Center (5,725); Richmond, Virginia
12/06/2013*; 7:00 pm	vs. Sam Houston State; Lumberjack Classic	L 76–77	2–7	William R. Johnson Coliseum (752); Nacogdoches, Texas
12/07/2013*; 9:15 pm, CSNMA	at Stephen F. Austin; Lumberjack Classic	L 57–70	2–8	William R. Johnson Coliseum (1,257); Nacogdoches, Texas
12/14/2013*; 7:00 pm	at High Point	W 84–69	3–8	Millis Center (1,439); High Point, North Carolina
12/18/2013*; 7:00 pm	at UNC Greensboro	L 65–78	3–9	Greensboro Coliseum (1,626); Greensboro, North Carolina
12/21/2013*; 3:00 pm, NBCSN	vs. Hampton; Governor's Holiday Hoops Classic	W 55–49	4–9	Richmond Coliseum (10,605); Richmond, Virginia
12/30/2013*; 8:00 pm	Ball State	W 73–68	5–9	JMU Convocation Center (3,172); Harrisonburg, Virginia
01/04/2014; 7:00 pm	at UNC Wilmington	W 60–55	6–9 (1–0)	Trask Coliseum (3,877); Wilmington, North Carolina
01/07/2014; 7:00 pm	at College of Charleston	L 61–75	6–10 (1–1)	TD Arena (4,163); Charleston, South Carolina
01/11/2014; 4:00 pm, CSNMA	Delaware	L 74–78	6–11 (1–2)	JMU Convocation Center (4,418); Harrisonburg, Virginia
01/15/2014; 7:00 pm	Northeastern	L 52–56	6–12 (1–3)	JMU Convocation Center (3,610); Harrisonburg, Virginia
01/18/2014; 4:00 pm, CSNMA	at William & Mary	L 56–78	6–13 (1–4)	Kaplan Arena (4,102); Williamsburg, Virginia
01/25/2014; 2:00 pm, CSNMA	College of Charleston	W 58–56	7–13 (2–4)	JMU Convocation Center (3,987); Harrisonburg, Virginia
01/29/2014; 7:00 pm	at Northeastern	W 49–46	8–13 (3–4)	Matthews Arena (911); Boston
02/02/2014; 2:30 pm, NBCSN	William & Mary	L 79–81	8–14 (3–5)	JMU Convocation Center (3,357); Harrisonburg, Virginia
02/04/2014; 7:00 pm, CSNMA	at Towson	L 71–80	8–15 (3–6)	SECU Arena (2,582); Towson, Maryland
02/08/2014; 2:00 pm	at Drexel	L 60–78	8–16 (3–7)	Daskalakis Athletic Center (2,023); Philadelphia
02/10/2014; 7:00 pm, CSNMA	Hofstra	W 59–53	9–16 (4–7)	JMU Convocation Center (3,160); Harrisonburg, Virginia
02/12/2014; 7:00 pm	at Delaware	L 65–81	9–17 (4–8)	Bob Carpenter Center (4,412); Newark, Delaware
02/15/2014; 12:00 pm, CSNMA	UNC Wilmington	W 64–62	10–17 (5–8)	JMU Convocation Center (3,262); Harrisonburg, Virginia
02/19/2014; 7:00 pm, CSNMA	Drexel	W 63–61 ^{OT}	11–17 (6–8)	JMU Convocation Center (3,011); Harrisonburg, Virginia
02/26/2014; 7:00 pm	Towson	L 66–69	11–18 (6–9)	JMU Convocation Center (4,108); Harrisonburg, Virginia
03/01/2014; 7:00 pm	at Hofstra	L 71–82	11–19 (6–10)	Mack Sports Complex (1,818); Hempstead, New York
2014 CAA tournament
03/08/2014; 6:00 pm, CSN	vs. Towson; Quarterfinals	L 71–80	11–20	Baltimore Arena (4,897); Baltimore
*Non-conference game. ^{#}Rankings from AP Poll. (#) Tournament seedings in parentheses. All times are in Eastern Time.
