= Jerrelle Benimon =

American basketball player (born 1991)

Personal information
- Born: August 1, 1991 (age 34) Warrenton, Virginia, U.S.
- Listed height: 6 ft 8 in (2.03 m)
- Listed weight: 245 lb (111 kg)

Career information
- High school: Fauquier (Warrenton, Virginia)
- College: Georgetown (2009–2011); Towson (2012–2014)
- NBA draft: 2014: undrafted
- Playing career: 2014–2019
- Position: Power forward

Career history
- 2014–2015: Idaho Stampede
- 2015: Utah Jazz
- 2015–2016: Foshan Dralions
- 2016–2017: Qingdao Eagles
- 2017–2018: Ulm
- 2018: Shaanxi Wolves
- 2019: Bnei Herzliya

Career highlights
- All-NBA D-League First Team (2015); NBA D-League All-Rookie First Team (2015); NBA D-League All-Star (2015); AP Honorable Mention All-American (2013); 2× CAA Player of the Year (2013, 2014); 2× First-team All-CAA (2013, 2014); 2× CAA All-Defensive Team (2013, 2014)
- Stats at NBA.com
- Stats at Basketball Reference

Jerrelle Benimon (born August 1, 1991) is an American former professional basketball player. In college, he was the 2012–13 Colonial Athletic Association Player of the Year as a redshirt junior after leading the Towson Tigers to the greatest single-season turnaround in National Collegiate Athletic Association (NCAA) Division I history; the Tigers finished with a 1–31 record in 2011–12 before completing an 18–13 season the following year. Benimon also tied for the second-highest rebounding average (11.2) in Division I behind only Siena's O. D. Anosike's 11.4 per game average. Benimon repeated as the player of the year as a senior in 2013–14 and, coincidentally, finished second in the national rebounding average for a second consecutive season (11.2).

== High school career ==
Benimon attended Fauquier High School in Warrenton, Virginia. In his junior season in 2007–08 he averaged 19.5 points, 12.5 rebounds, 3.4 blocks and 3.5 assists per game. Then, as a senior, he averaged 21 points, 17 rebounds, 7 assists and 4 blocks per game en route to his second consecutive Cedar Run District Player of the Year award. On February 17, 2009, Benimon recorded a quadruple-double against Osbourn High School with 13 points, 17 rebounds, 11 assists, 10 blocks.

== College career ==
Benimon spent his first two collegiate seasons playing for the Hoyas of Georgetown University. He saw limited action in both seasons and scored a total of 84 points in 61 game appearances. He decided to transfer after his sophomore year in 2010–11, one in which he only averaged 10.2 minutes per game. Benimon said he "probably got 100 phone calls" from schools who were trying to recruit him as a transfer player, but he ultimately decided on Towson because "...the assistant that recruited me from Towson. He treated me like a big deal. He’d send me an e-mail 1,000 times a day. He’d call me all the time."

Having to sit out the 2011–12 season due to NCAA by-laws, Benimon flew under the radar heading in the Colonial Athletic Association's 2012–13 season. He was not even selected to an All-CAA team during the conference's preseason media day. Benimon burst onto the national scene during his junior year after averaging 17.1 points, 11.2 rebounds, 2.5 assists and 1.9 blocks per game. He was named the CAA Player of the Week four times, its player of the year at the end of the regular season, and guided its 17.5-game turnaround from 2011–12 (the biggest turnaround in Division I history) by leading Towson in points, rebounds, assists and blocks. In an early season loss against Temple, Benimon scored 30 points and grabbed 18 rebounds; in an improbable road win against Oregon State, he recorded 20 points and 21 rebounds. Benimon was a top 10 finalist for the Lou Henson Award, given to the nation's best mid-major men's basketball player.

Benimon's senior season in 2013–14 saw him lead the Tigers to a second-place finish in the CAA behind Delaware, finishing the year with a 13–3 conference record (25–11 overall). The 25 wins is a program record for their Division I era. Towson, seeded second in the 2014 CAA tournament, was upset in the semifinals by third-seeded William & Mary, ending their chance at an automatic NCAA tournament bid. The Tigers accepted an invitation to play in the 2014 CollegeInsider.com Postseason Tournament, however, and won their first two games before falling in the quarterfinals against Murray State. For the year, Benimon averaged 18.7 points, 11.2 rebounds (second best in the nation behind UC Santa Barbara's Alan Williams), 3.6 assists, and 1.2 blocks per game. Benimon's 404 total rebounds set a new school single-season record; it also ranks second all-time in CAA men's basketball history. For the second straight season, Benimon was voted to the CAA's All-Defensive Team as well as being named the CAA Player of the Year.

== Professional career ==
=== 2014–15 season ===
After going undrafted in the 2014 NBA draft, Benimon joined the Miami Heat for Orlando Summer League and the Denver Nuggets for the Las Vegas Summer League. On September 30, 2014, he signed with the Nuggets, but was later waived by the team on October 22 before the start of the 2014–15 NBA season. On November 18, he was acquired by the Idaho Stampede of the NBA Development League. On February 4, he was named to the Futures All-Star team for the 2015 NBA D-League All-Star Game.

On March 6, 2015, Benimon signed a 10-day contract with the Utah Jazz. Following the expiration of his contract on March 16, he was not offered a second 10-day contract by the Jazz, parting ways with the team after appearing in just two games and returned to the Stampede that same day. On April 22, he was named to the 2015 All-NBA D-League first team and the All-Rookie first team.

=== 2015–16 season ===
In July 2015, Benimon joined the Cleveland Cavaliers for the 2015 NBA Summer League. On September 17, he signed with the Foshan Dralions.

=== 2016–17 season ===
Benimon joined the Brooklyn Nets for the 2016 NBA Summer League. On September 10, he signed with Qingdao DoubleStar of the Chinese Basketball Association. On March 2, 2017, Delaware 87ers acquired rights to Benimon.

=== 2017–18 season ===
On October 29, 2017, Benimon signed with German club ratiopharm Ulm.

=== 2018–19 season ===
On August 15, 2018, Benimon signed with the New Zealand Breakers for the 2018–19 NBL season. He was released by the Breakers on September 3 due to personal issues.

On January 10, 2019, Benimon signed with Bnei Herzliya of the Israeli Premier League for the rest of the season.

== NBA career statistics ==
Legend
GP	Games played	GS	Games started	MPG	Minutes per game
FG%	Field goal percentage	3P%	3-point field goal percentage	FT%	Free throw percentage
RPG	Rebounds per game	APG	Assists per game	SPG	Steals per game
BPG	Blocks per game	PPG	Points per game	**Bold**	Career high

=== Regular season ===
Year	Team	GP	GS	MPG	FG%	3P%	FT%	RPG	APG	SPG	BPG	PPG
2014–15	Utah	2	0	1.5	.000	.000	.000	1.5	.0	.0	.0	.0
Career		2	0	1.5	.000	.000	.000	1.5	.0	.0	.0	.0
