= 2013–14 Delaware Fightin' Blue Hens men's basketball team =

American college basketball season

2013–14 Delaware Fightin' Blue Hens men's basketball

CAA Regular Season & tournament champions

NCAA tournament, round of 64
- Conference: Colonial Athletic Association
- Record: 25–10 (14–2 CAA)
- Head coach: Monté Ross (8th season)
- Assistant coaches: Jeff Rafferty; Phil Martelli, Jr.; Chris Cheeks
- Home arena: Bob Carpenter Center

2013–14 CAA men's basketball standings
	Conf.				Overall
Team	W		L	PCT	W		L	PCT
Delaware †	14	–	2	.875	25	–	10	.714
Towson	13	–	3	.813	25	–	11	.694
William & Mary	10	–	6	.625	20	–	12	.625
Drexel	8	–	8	.500	16	–	14	.533
Northeastern	7	–	9	.438	11	–	21	.344
College of Charleston	6	–	10	.375	14	–	18	.438
James Madison	6	–	10	.375	11	–	20	.355
Hofstra	5	–	11	.313	10	–	23	.303
UNC Wilmington	3	–	13	.188	9	–	23	.281
† 2014 CAA tournament winner Rankings from AP poll

The 2013–14 Delaware Fightin' Blue Hens men's basketball team represented the University of Delaware during the 2013–14 NCAA Division I men's basketball season. The Fightin' Blue Hens, led by eighth year head coach Monté Ross, played their home games at the Bob Carpenter Center and were members of the Colonial Athletic Association. They finished the season 25–10, 14–2 in CAA play to win the CAA regular season championship. They were also champions of the CAA tournament to earn an automatic bid to the NCAA tournament where they lost in the second round to Michigan State.

== Roster ==
2013–14 Delaware Fightin' Blue Hens men's basketball team
Players
Coaches

Pos.	#	Name	Height	Weight	Year	Hometown
G	0	Davon Usher	6 ft 6 in (1.98 m)	200 lb (91 kg)	Sr	Baltimore, Maryland
F	1	Tom Allshouse (W)	6 ft 6 in (1.98 m)	230 lb (104 kg)	Jr	Middletown, Delaware
F	2	Barnett Harris	6 ft 9 in (2.06 m)	210 lb (95 kg)	Fr	Monroeville, Pennsylvania
G	4	Jarvis Threatt	6 ft 2 in (1.88 m)	170 lb (77 kg)	Jr	Richmond, Virginia
G	10	Devon Saddler (C)	6 ft 2 in (1.88 m)	210 lb (95 kg)	Sr	Aberdeen, Maryland
F	11	Devonne Pinkard	6 ft 6 in (1.98 m)	205 lb (93 kg)	Fr	Lancaster, Pennsylvania
G	13	Kyle Anderson	6 ft 3 in (1.91 m)	200 lb (91 kg)	Jr	Newark, Illinois
F	15	Maurice Jeffers	6 ft 9 in (2.06 m)	235 lb (107 kg)	RS Fr	Washington D.C.
F	21	Marvin King-Davis	6 ft 7 in (2.01 m)	230 lb (104 kg)	RS So	Richmond, Virginia
G	22	Cazmon Hayes	6 ft 4 in (1.93 m)	195 lb (88 kg)	Fr	Charlotte, North Carolina
G	24	Sean Locke (W)	6 ft 4 in (1.93 m)	195 lb (88 kg)	So	Newark, Delaware
G	31	Dylan Miller (W)	6 ft 4 in (1.93 m)	200 lb (91 kg)	So	Wilmington, Delaware
F	33	Carl Baptiste	6 ft 9 in (2.06 m)	260 lb (118 kg)	Sr	Pittstown, New Jersey
F	55	Tommy Williams	6 ft 8 in (2.03 m)	205 lb (93 kg)	Sr	Hamden, Connecticut

Head coach

- Monté Ross (Winston Salem State)

Assistant coach(es)

- Jeff Rafferty (Springfield)
- Chris Cheeks (Virginia Commonwealth)
- Phil Martelli, Jr. (Saint Joseph's)

Legend

- (C) Team captain
- (S) Suspended
- (I) Ineligible
- (W) Walk-on
- Injured
- Current redshirt

== Schedule ==
Date time, TV	Rank^{#}	Opponent^{#}	Result	Record	Site (attendance) city, state
Regular season
11/08/2013*; 7:00 pm, WTVR		at Richmond	L 69–71	0–1	Robins Center (6,721); Richmond, VA
11/10/2013*; 2:00 pm		Charleston Southern	L 93–95	0–2	Bob Carpenter Center (2,189); Newark, DE
11/17/2013*; 2:00 pm		at Hampton	W 90–79	1–2	Hampton Convocation Center (1,287); Hampton, VA
11/19/2013*; 7:00 pm		at Army	W 89–74	2–2	Christl Arena (569); West Point, NY
11/22/2013*; 7:00 pm, FS1		at Villanova	L 80–84	2–3	The Pavilion (6,500); Villanova, PA
11/25/2013*; 7:00 pm		at Delaware State	W 80–70	3–3	Memorial Hall (1,328); Dover, DE
11/30/2013*; 12:00 pm		Robert Morris	W 86–67	4–3	Bob Carpenter Center (1,823); Newark, DE
12/03/2013*; 7:30 pm		at Charleston Southern	W 85–80	5–3	CSU Field House (853); Charleston, SC
12/07/2013*; 4:00 pm, ACCN		at Notre Dame; Gotham Classic	L 75–80	5–4	Edmund P. Joyce Center (8,157); Notre Dame, IN
12/16/2013*; 8:00 pm, Me-TV ND		at North Dakota State; Gotham Classic	L 66–85	5–5	Bison Sports Arena (3,014); Fargo, ND
12/18/2013*; 7:00 pm, BTN		at No. 3 Ohio State; Gotham Classic	L 64–76	5–6	Value City Arena (14,420); Columbus, OH
12/21/2013*; 9:30 pm		vs. Bryant; Gotham Classic	W 108–107 ^{OT}	6–6	Madison Square Garden (10,138); New York City, NY
12/30/2013*; 5:00 pm		at St. Bonaventure	L 73–80	6–7	Reilly Center (3,689); Olean, NY
01/01/2014*; 3:00 pm		Liberty	W 77–64	7–7	Bob Carpenter Center (2,058); Newark, DE
01/04/2014*; 2:00 pm		Cal Poly	W 82–72	8–7	Bob Carpenter Center (1,980); Newark, DE
01/08/2014; 7:00 pm		Hofstra	W 86–79	9–7 (1-0)	Bob Carpenter Center (1,842); Newark, DE
01/11/2014; 4:00 pm, CSNMA, CSNP		at James Madison	W 78–74	10–7 (2–0)	JMU Convocation Center (4,418); Harrisonburg, VA
01/15/2014; 7:00 pm		William & Mary	W 76–71	11–7 (3–0)	Bob Carpenter Center (2,793); Newark, DE
01/18/2014; 12:00 pm, CSNMA, CSNP		at Northeastern	W 74–70	12–7 (4–0)	Matthews Arena (1,082); Boston, MA
01/22/2014; 7:00 pm, NBCSN		at Drexel	W 90–77	13–7 (5–0)	Daskalakis Athletic Center (2,017); Philadelphia, PA
01/25/2014; 12:00 pm, CSNMA, TCN		Towson	W 83–76	14–7 (6–0)	Bob Carpenter Center (4,138); Newark, DE
01/29/2014; 7:00 pm		at William & Mary	W 89–72	15–7 (7–0)	Kaplan Arena (3,112); Williamsburg, VA
02/01/2014; 12:00 pm, CSNMA, CSNP		UNC Wilmington	W 66–65	16–7 (8–0)	Bob Carpenter Center (2,584); Newark, DE
02/03/2014; 7:00 pm		Northeastern	W 80–67	17–7 (9–0)	Bob Carpenter Center (1,965); Newark, DE
02/05/2014; 7:00 pm		College of Charleston	W 67–64	18–7 (10–0)	Bob Carpenter Center (2,403); Newark, DE
02/12/2014; 7:00 pm		James Madison	W 81–65	19–7 (11–0)	Bob Carpenter Center (4,412); Newark, DE
02/17/2014; 7:00 pm, NBCSN		at Towson	L 63–78	19–8 (11–1)	SECU Arena (4,003); Towson, MD
02/19/2014; 7:00 pm		at Hofstra	W 81–77	20–8 (12–1)	Mack Sports Complex (1,293); Hempstead, NY
02/23/2014; 3:00 pm, CSNMA, CSNP		Drexel	L 65–69	20–9 (12–2)	Bob Carpenter Center (5,122); Newark, DE
02/26/2014; 7:00 pm		at UNC Wilmington	W 70–57	21–9 (13–2)	Trask Coliseum (3,338); Wilmington, NC
03/01/2014; 2:00 pm, CSNMA, TCN		at College of Charleston	W 89–86	22–9 (14–2)	TD Arena (2,631); Charleston, SC
CAA tournament
03/08/2014; 12:00 pm, CSNMA, CSNP		vs. Hofstra; Quarterfinals	W 87–76	23–9	Baltimore Arena (2,998); Baltimore, MD
03/09/2014; 2:30 pm, NBCSN		vs. Northeastern; Semifinals	W 87–74	24–9	Baltimore Arena (4,051); Baltimore, MD
03/10/2014; 7:00 pm, NBCSN		vs. William & Mary; Championship	W 75–74	25–9	Baltimore Arena (5,414); Baltimore, MD
NCAA tournament
03/20/2014; 5:40 pm, TNT	No. (13 E)	vs. No. 11 (4 E) Michigan State; Second round	L 78–93	25–10	Spokane Veterans Memorial Arena (10,862); Spokane, WA
*Non-conference game. ^{#}Rankings from AP Poll. (#) Tournament seedings in parentheses. All times are in Eastern Time. (#) during NCAA Tournament is seed within region E=East.
