= 2013–14 William & Mary Tribe men's basketball team =

American college basketball season

2013–14 William & Mary Tribe men's basketball
- Conference: Colonial Athletic Association
- Record: 20–12 (10–6 CAA)
- Head coach: Tony Shaver (11th season)
- Assistant coaches: Jonathan Holmes; Kotie Kimble; Austin Shaver
- Home arena: Kaplan Arena

2013–14 CAA men's basketball standings
	Conf.				Overall
Team	W		L	PCT	W		L	PCT
Delaware †	14	–	2	.875	25	–	10	.714
Towson	13	–	3	.813	25	–	11	.694
William & Mary	10	–	6	.625	20	–	12	.625
Drexel	8	–	8	.500	16	–	14	.533
Northeastern	7	–	9	.438	11	–	21	.344
College of Charleston	6	–	10	.375	14	–	18	.438
James Madison	6	–	10	.375	11	–	20	.355
Hofstra	5	–	11	.313	10	–	23	.303
UNC Wilmington	3	–	13	.188	9	–	23	.281
† 2014 CAA tournament winner Rankings from AP poll

The 2013–14 William & Mary Tribe men's basketball team represented the College of William & Mary during the 2013–14 NCAA Division I men's basketball season. The Tribe, led by 11th year head coach Tony Shaver, played their home games at Kaplan Arena and were members of the Colonial Athletic Association. With his 11th season, Shaver became the longest-tenured coach in program history.

The team finished the season 20–12, 10–6 in CAA play and lost in the championship game of the 2014 CAA men's basketball tournament to Delaware, 74–75. The one-point margin is the closest that William & Mary has come to qualifying for the NCAA Division I men's basketball tournament; the Tribe lost all seven of its previous tournament bid-clinching games including three prior CAA championship games (1983, 2008, and 2010). Despite the team's final record, William & Mary elected not to participate in a postseason tournament, which would have been its first postseason bid since 2010.

== Preseason ==
On October 22, 2013, William & Mary was picked to finish fifth, out of nine teams, in the Colonial Athletic Association's pre-season coaches poll. Junior guard Marcus Thornton was picked to the first all-conference team while senior forward Tim Rusthoven was selected to the second all-conference team.

== Roster ==
#	Name	Height	Weight	Position	Class	Hometown	Previous team(s)
0	Daniel Dixon	6'5"	200	G	Fr.	Great Falls, Virginia	Langley High School (Virginia) / Fishburne Military School
2	Julian Boatner	6'2"	185	G	Sr.	Bloomington, Indiana	Bloomington High School North
3	Marcus Thornton	6'4"	185	G	Jr.	Upper Marlboro, Maryland	Bishop McNamara High School
4	Omar Prewitt	6'6"	180	G/F	Fr.	Mount Sterling, Kentucky	Montgomery County High School (KY)
5	Ben Whitlatch	6'1"	180	G	Sr.	Bloomington, Indiana	Bloomington High School South
11	Michael Schlotman	6'4"	190	G	Fr.	Munster, Indiana	Munster High School
12	Brandon Britt	6'2"	200	G	Sr.	Chesapeake, Virginia	Atlantic Shores Christian School
22	Tim Rusthoven	6'9"	235	F	Sr.	Winfield, Illinois	Wheaton Academy
23	Kyle Gaillard	6'8"	220	F	Sr.	Huntersville, North Carolina	North Mecklenburg High School
24	Fred Heldring	6'9"	245	F	Sr.	Winnetka, Illinois	Menomonee Falls High School
25	Terry Tarpey	6'5"	200	G	So.	Stamford, Connecticut	Fairfield College Preparatory School
31	Sean Sheldon	6'9"	245	F	So.	Traverse City, Michigan	St. Francis High School
41	Jack Whitman	6'9"	225	F	Fr.	Lexington, Kentucky	Lexington Catholic High School
43	Tom Schalk	6'8"	220	F	Jr.	Burnsville, Minnesota	Apple Valley High School

== Schedule and results ==
Date time, TV	Opponent	Result	Record	Site (attendance) city, state
Non-conference schedule
11/08/2013*; 7:00 p.m.	at Hampton	L 69–77	0–1	Hampton Convocation Center (4,824); Hampton, Virginia
11/12/2013*; 7:00 p.m.	Liberty	W 84–72	1–1	Kaplan Arena at William & Mary Hall (2,250); Williamsburg, Virginia
11/14/2013*; 8:00 p.m.	at No. 16 Wichita State; CBE Hall of Fame Classic	L 62–79	1–2	Charles Koch Arena (10,506); Wichita, Kansas
11/20/2013*; 7:00 p.m.	High Point	L 69–80	1–3	Kaplan Arena at William & Mary Hall (2,275); Williamsburg, Virginia
11/23/2013*; 2:00 p.m.	at Rutgers	W 72–62	2–3	The RAC (4,027); Piscataway, New Jersey
11/27/2013*; 7:00 pm	VMI	W 97–67	3–3	Kaplan Arena at William & Mary Hall (3,111); Williamsburg, Virginia
11/30/2013*; 7:00 p.m.	at Howard	W 84–79 ^{OT}	4–3	Burr Gymnasium (752); Washington, D.C.
12/04/2013*; 7:00 p.m.	Richmond	L 60–71	4–4	Kaplan Arena at William & Mary Hall (2,621); Williamsburg, Virginia
12/07/2013*; 2:00 pm, ESPN3	at Wofford	W 63–60	5–4	Benjamin Johnson Arena (1,012); Spartanburg, South Carolina
12/20/2013*; 7:00 p.m.	Goucher	W 94–60	6–4	Kaplan Arena at William & Mary Hall (2,703); Williamsburg, Virginia
12/29/2013*; 3:00 p.m., RTPT	vs. West Virginia	L 45–82	6–5	Charleston Civic Center (8,885); Charleston, West Virginia
01/01/2014*; 7:00 p.m.	Old Dominion; Rivalry	W 74–68	7–5	Kaplan Arena at William & Mary Hall (2,806); Williamsburg, Virginia
01/04/2014*; 8:00 p.m.	at Western Illinois	W 78–67	8–5	Western Hall (1,096); Macomb, Illinois
Conference schedule
01/08/2014; 7:00 p.m.	Drexel	W 85–73	9–5 (1–0)	Kaplan Arena at William & Mary Hall (2,729); Williamsburg, Virginia
01/15/2014; 7:00 p.m.	at Delaware	L 71–76	9–6 (1–1)	Bob Carpenter Center (2,793); Newark, Delaware
01/18/2014; 4:00 p.m., CSNMA	James Madison	W 78–56	10–6 (2–1)	Kaplan Arena at William & Mary Hall (4,102); Williamsburg, Virginia
01/22/2014; 7:00 p.m.	at Hofstra	L 60–77	10–7 (2–2)	Mack Sports Complex (748); Hempstead, New York
01/25/2014; 4:00 p.m.	at Drexel	W 68–66	11–7 (3–2)	Daskalakis Athletic Center (2,457); Philadelphia
01/27/2014; 7:00 p.m.	College of Charleston	W 74–63	12–7 (4–2)	Kaplan Arena at William & Mary Hall (2,730); Williamsburg, Virginia
01/29/2014; 7:00 p.m.	Delaware	L 72–89	12–8 (4–3)	Kaplan Arena at William & Mary Hall (3,112); Williamsburg, Virginia
02/02/2014; 2:30 p.m., NBCSN	at James Madison	W 81–79	13–8 (5–3)	JMU Convocation Center (3,357); Harrisonburg, Virginia
02/05/2014; 7:00 p.m.	at UNC Wilmington	W 54–50	14–8 (6–3)	Trask Coliseum (3,030); Wilmington, North Carolina
02/08/2014; 7:00 p.m.	at Northeastern	W 82–70	15–8 (7–3)	Matthews Arena (1,309); Boston
02/15/2014; 4:00 p.m., CSNMA	Towson	L 70–85	15–9 (7–4)	Kaplan Arena at William & Mary Hall (3,306); Williamsburg, Virginia
02/17/2014; 7:00 p.m.	UNC Wilmington	W 93–70	16–9 (8–4)	Kaplan Arena at William & Mary Hall (2,606); Williamsburg, Virginia
02/19/2014; 7:00 p.m.	at College of Charleston	L 54–87	16–10 (8–5)	TD Arena (2,654); Charleston, South Carolina
02/22/2014; 4:00 p.m., CSNMA	Northeastern	W 81–67	17–10 (9–5)	Kaplan Arena at William & Mary Hall (3,112); Williamsburg, Virginia
02/26/2014; 7:00 p.m.	Hofstra	W 79–74	18–10 (10–5)	Kaplan Arena at William & Mary Hall (2,284); Williamsburg, Virginia
03/01/2014; 4:00 p.m., CSNMA	at Towson	L 68–70	18–11 (10–6)	Tiger Arena at Towson Center (4,119); Towson, Maryland
2014 CAA Tournament
03/08/2014; 8:30 p.m., CSN	vs. (6) College of Charleston; Quarterfinals	W 70–59	19–11	Baltimore Arena (4,897); Baltimore
03/09/2014; 5:00 p.m., NBCSN	vs. (2) Towson; Semifinals	W 75–71	20–11	Baltimore Arena (4,051); Baltimore
03/10/2014; 7:00 p.m., NBCSN	vs. (1) Delaware; Championship	L 74–75	20–12	Baltimore Arena (5,414); Baltimore
*Non-conference game. ^{#}Rankings from AP Poll. (#) Tournament seedings in parentheses. All times are in Eastern Time.

== Postseason ==
Three William & Mary players received CAA end-of-season accolades. Junior guard Marcus Thornton was named to the first all-conference team, the first Tribe player to receive this distinction since Adam Hess in 2004. He was named to the National Association of Basketball Coaches (NABC) All-District 10 First Team for the second time, tying him for the most NABC First Team selections in program history. CollegeInsider.com named Thornton their CAA Most Valuable Player (which is not technically the same thing as the player of the year, according to CollegeInsider.com). Thornton's 599 points on the season ranked fifth all-time in school history and the most by a player for the Tribe since 1959–60.

Other accolades went to senior forward Tim Rusthoven, who was selected to the all-conference second team, and freshman Omar Prewitt, who was named the CAA Rookie of the Year, becoming only the second William & Mary men's player to receive this honor.
