= Monté Ross =

American college basketball coach (born 1970)

Current position
- Title: Head coach
- Team: North Carolina A&T
- Conference: CAA
- Record: 25–69 (.266)

Biographical details
- Born: August 11, 1970 (age 56); Philadelphia, Pennsylvania, U.S.

Playing career
- 1988–1992: Winston-Salem State
- Position: Guard

Coaching career (HC unless noted)
- 1993–1994: Lehigh (assistant)
- 1994–1996: Drexel (assistant)
- 1996–2006: Saint Joseph's (assistant)
- 2006–2016: Delaware
- 2019–2023: Temple (assistant)
- 2023–present: North Carolina A&T

Head coaching record
- Overall: 157–253 (.383)
- Tournaments: 0–1 (NCAA Division I); 0–1 (CBI)

Accomplishments and honors

Championships
- CAA tournament (2014); CAA regular season (2014)

Awards
- CAA Coach of the Year (2014)

Monté Ross (born August 11, 1970) is an American college basketball coach, currently the head coach at North Carolina A&T. He previously served as the head men's basketball coach at the University of Delaware. Ross has two children: Justin and Lauren. He is married to Michelle Ross.

== Head coaching record ==
Record table
Season	Team	Overall	Conference	Standing	Postseason
Delaware Fightin' Blue Hens (Colonial Athletic Association) (2006–2016)
2006–07	Delaware	5–26	3–15	12th	
2007–08	Delaware	14–17	9–9	7th	
2008–09	Delaware	13–19	6–12	9th	
2009–10	Delaware	7–24	3–15	12th	
2010–11	Delaware	14–17	8–10	7th	
2011–12	Delaware	18–14	12–6	5th	CBI first round
2012–13	Delaware	19–14	13–5	2nd	
2013–14	Delaware	25–10	14–2	1st	NCAA Division I Round of 64
2014–15	Delaware	10–20	9–9	T–6th	
2015–16	Delaware	7–23	2–16	10th	
Delaware:		132–184 (.418)	79–100 (.441)		
North Carolina A&T Aggies (Coastal Athletic Association) (2023–present)
2023–24	North Carolina A&T	7–25	5–13	12th	
2024–25	North Carolina A&T	7–25	3–15	14th	
2025–26	North Carolina A&T	11–19	4–14	12th	
North Carolina A&T:		25–69 (.266)	12–42 (.222)		
Total:		157–253 (.383)			
National champion Postseason invitational champion Conference regular season champion Conference regular season and conference tournament champion Division regular season champion Division regular season and conference tournament champion Conference tournament champion
