= Chris Fouch =

American basketball player

No. 3 – BK Iskra Svit
- Position: Shooting guard
- League: Slovak Extraliga

Personal information
- Born: December 3, 1990 (age 35) Brooklyn, New York, U.S.
- Listed height: 6 ft 2 in (1.88 m)
- Listed weight: 185 lb (84 kg)

Career information
- High school: Rice (Harlem, New York)
- College: Drexel (2009–2014)
- NBA draft: 2014: undrafted
- Playing career: 2014–present

Career history
- 2014–present: BK Iskra Svit

Career highlights
- Second team All-CAA (2014); Third team All-CAA (2011); CAA Rookie of the Year (2010); CAA All-Rookie Team (2010)

Chris Fouch (born December 3, 1990) is an American basketball player who currently plays for BK Iskra Svit. He was named to the Second Team All-CAA following the 2013–14 season as a sixth-year senior, and was also named CAA Rookie of the Year in 2010 playing for Drexel University. Following his last season at Drexel, he ranked fifth on the school's career scoring list with 1,744 points.

== High school ==
Fouch attended Rice High School in Harlem, New York. In his senior year, he averaged over 15 points per game and shot 46 percent from behind the three-point line, earning him a First Team All New York City selection. He was named the MVP of the Nike Super-6 Invitational, and also set an AAU IS8 Spring League Tournament record with 72 points in one game, including 16 three-pointers.

== College ==
At his first year attending Drexel University, Fouch suffered a knee injury before the basketball season began. This caused him to sit out the entire season and redshirt his freshman year.

The next season as a redshirt freshman, Fouch came off the bench for the Dragons at shooting guard, and was named the Colonial Athletic Association (CAA) Rookie of the Year. This was the first time a player from Drexel received the award. During that season, he averaged 11.3 points per game, leading all freshman in the CAA.

The following season, Fouch was named to the Third Team All CAA after leading Drexel in scoring with 14.9 points per game. This included a 30-point game against Binghamton, and back-to-back 27 point games against Northeastern in TD Garden and Rider.

In his redshirt junior season at Drexel, Fouch led the team with three-pointers made despite missing the first 4 games of the season due to injury. He also finished third in the CAA in free throw percentage at 81.7%.

The next season, Chris Fouch suffered a broken ankle in the third game of the season against Penn, forcing him to miss the rest of the season and redshirt for a second time. At the time of the injury, Fouch was averaging 16.7 points per game and shot 48 percent from deep.

In his sixth and final year at Drexel, classified as a graduate student, Fouch was named to the Third Team All CAA after averaging 18.3 points per game. He also led the team in assists per game and free throw percentage.

== Professional ==
Following his final season at Drexel, Fouch signed with sports agent Gilad Berkowitz of Berkowitz Career Ventures. Fouch worked out for the Philadelphia 76ers on May 27, 2014, and later went undrafted in the 2014 NBA draft

=== BK Iskra Svit ===
On November 16, 2014, Fouch signed with Svit of the Slovak Extraliga.

=== The Basketball Tournament (TBT) (2017–present) ===
In the summer of 2017, Fouch played in The Basketball Tournament on ESPN for the Broad Street Brawlers. He competed for the $2 million prize, and for the Brawlers, he averaged 5.3 points per game, shooting 43 percent behind the three-point line. Fouch helped the Brawlers reach the second round, but lost to Team Colorado 111–95.
