= Zeke Upshaw =

American basketball player (1991–2018)

Personal information
- Born: May 27, 1991 Chicago, Illinois, U.S.
- Died: March 26, 2018 (aged 26) Grand Rapids, Michigan, U.S.
- Listed height: 6 ft 6 in (1.98 m)
- Listed weight: 215 lb (98 kg)

Career information
- High school: U. of Chicago Laboratory Schools (Chicago, Illinois)
- College: Illinois State (2010–2013); Hofstra (2013–2014)
- NBA draft: 2014: undrafted
- Playing career: 2014–2018
- Position: Small forward

Career history
- 2014–2015: Helios Suns
- 2015–2016: Basket Esch
- 2016–2018: Grand Rapids Drive

Career highlights
- Second-team All-CAA (2014)

Zena Ray "Zeke" Upshaw (May 27, 1991 – March 26, 2018) was an American professional basketball player. He began his college basketball career with the Illinois State Redbirds. After playing sparingly for three seasons, he transferred to join the Hofstra Pride, where he led the Colonial Athletic Association (CAA) in scoring and was named second-team all-conference. Upshaw played professionally in Slovenia and Luxembourg before returning to the United States and joining the Grand Rapids Drive of the NBA Development League (now known as the G League). In the Drive's regular season finale in 2017–18, he collapsed on the court in the game's final minute and died two days later.

== High school career ==
Upshaw was born in Chicago. As a child, he gravitated toward basketballs at Toys "R" Us over all the other toys in the store. He began playing organized basketball when he was six. Upshaw attended the University of Chicago Laboratory Schools where he averaged 24 points, 12 rebounds and seven assists as a junior in 2008, when he was named the most valuable player (MVP) of the Independent School League.

== College career ==
After redshirting his first year at Illinois State University (ISU), Upshaw played three years for the Redbirds, albeit with minimal playing time. He averaged 1.6 points per game, while never averaging more than 7.4 minutes played per game. He graduated from Illinois State with a degree in apparel, merchandising and design in 2013, but transferred to Hofstra for his final season of NCAA eligibility. Upshaw exercised the graduate transfer exception, which enables players who have already received their degree but have eligibility remaining to be able to play immediately at another school while studying for a post-graduate degree in a discipline that was not available in their previous school. He was seeking a school where he could be an "impact player and have an opportunity to [play professionally] overseas or somewhere."

After receiving his release from ISU, Upshaw was originally recruited by Niagara coach Joe Mihalich. However, the coach left soon for Hofstra, where he told Upshaw the opportunity to play was even higher because four players had been kicked off the team after a burglary incident. On January 15, 2014, Upshaw scored 27 points and tied a Pride record with seven three-pointers in a 69–64 win over UNC-Wilmington. He led the CAA in scoring at 19.8 points per game, and earned second-team All-CAA honors. His 17.3 points per game increase over his 2.5 average from 2012 to 2013 was the largest increase in Division I basketball.

== Professional career ==
After going undrafted in the 2014 NBA draft, he passed on the option to enter the NBA Development League Draft. Instead, he signed with Helios Suns of the Premier A Slovenian Basketball League in September 2014. In 30 games for Helios in 2014–15, he averaged 9.8 points and 3.2 rebounds per game.

In August 2015, Upshaw signed with Basket Esch of Luxembourg's Total League for the 2015–16 season. In 27 games, he averaged 20.9 points, 7.6 rebounds and 1.1 assists per game.

After deciding to enter the 2016 NBA Development League Draft, Upshaw was selected in the fourth round by the Grand Rapids Drive. In 34 games for the Drive in 2016–17, he averaged 6.5 points and 3.0 rebounds per game.

== Death ==
On March 24, 2018, Upshaw scored 11 points in the regular-season finale to earn a playoff spot for Grand Rapids in a 101–99 home win over the Long Island Nets. In the game's final minute, however, he collapsed and was taken off the court at DeltaPlex Arena on a stretcher. Paramedics started cardiopulmonary resuscitation in the ambulance, seven minutes after his collapse, and his heart did not start again until 40 minutes later in the hospital. Two days later on March 26, Upshaw died in Spectrum Hospital in Grand Rapids, Michigan, at the age of 26. The Kent County medical examiner's preliminary determination after conducting an autopsy was that Upshaw had a sudden cardiac death. It was later expanded to state Upshaw had "cardiac abnormalities" that his family had no prior knowledge of. Out of respect for Upshaw, the NBA G League delayed the first round of the 2018 playoffs, while the Detroit Pistons gave him an honorary call-up to the team on March 29 for their game against the Washington Wizards.

On May 30, 2018, Upshaw's parents filed a wrongful death lawsuit against the NBA, the Detroit Pistons, the SSJ Group, who owns the Grand Rapids Drive, and the DeltaPlex Arena. Afterwards, the Detroit Free Press reported that a year earlier, he had fainted and been diagnosed with hypertrophic cardiomyopathy, which is the chief cause of heart-related deaths of young athletes in the U.S. and which, combined with over-exertion, is believed to have killed him.

In July 2019, the NBA and the Detroit Pistons settled a lawsuit with Upshaw's family.

== See also ==
- Sudden cardiac death of athletes
- List of basketball players who died during their careers
