= Frantz Massenat =

American basketball player (born 1992)

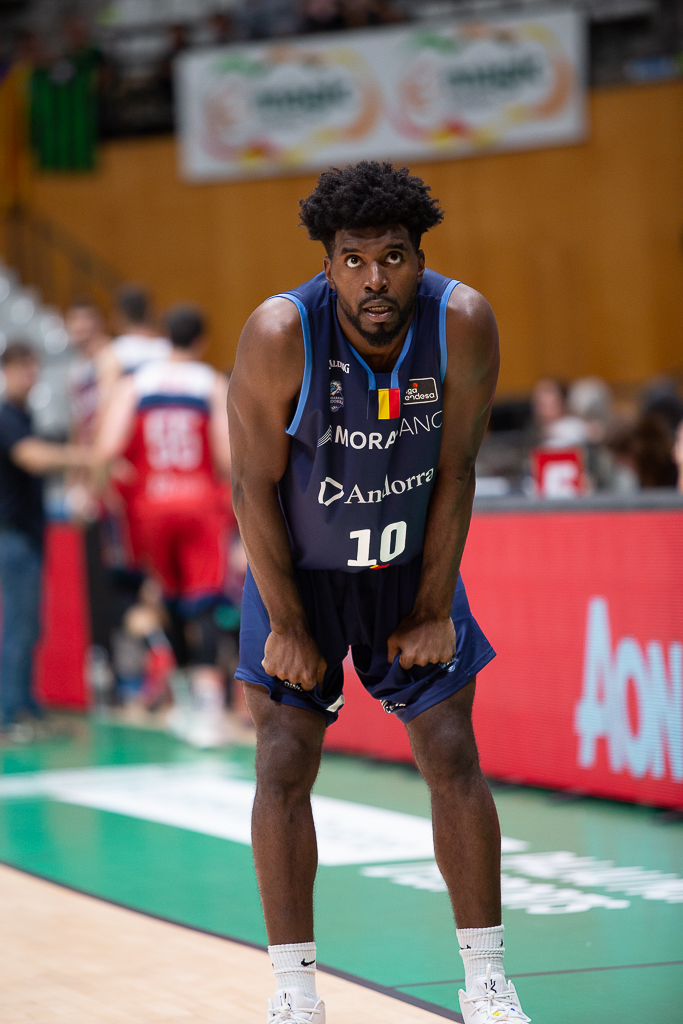
- Massenat with Andorra in 2019

Drexel Dragons
- Position: Assistant coach
- League: Coastal Athletic Association

Personal information
- Born: January 17, 1992 (age 34) Ewing Township, New Jersey, U.S.
- Listed height: 1.92 m (6 ft 4 in)
- Listed weight: 87 kg (192 lb)

Career information
- High school: Trenton Catholic Academy (Hamilton, New Jersey)
- College: Drexel (2010–2014)
- NBA draft: 2014: undrafted
- Playing career: 2014–2023

Career history

Playing
- 2014–2016: Mitteldeutscher BC
- 2016–2019: EWE Baskets Oldenburg
- 2019–2020: Andorra
- 2020–2021: Victoria Libertas Pesaro
- 2021: Saski Baskonia
- 2021–2022: Niners Chemnitz
- 2022–2023: JL Bourg

Coaching
- 2023–present: Drexel (assistant)

Career highlights
- 2× First-team All-CAA (2012, 2014); Second-team All-CAA (2013); CAA All-Rookie team (2011)

Jean Frantz Massenat Jr. (born January 17, 1992) is an American-Haitian professional basketball coach and former player who is an assistant coach for the Drexel Dragons. In his collegiate career at Drexel University, He was named to the First Team All-CAA following the 2011–12 season as a sophomore, leading the Drexel Dragons to 2012 CAA men's basketball tournament where they were narrowly defeated by Virginia Commonwealth University. Massenat started in every game of his collegiate career at Drexel. Following his senior season, he ranked sixth on Drexel's career scoring list with 1,646 points, and his 548 career assists ranked third all-time at Drexel and ninth in CAA history.

== High school ==
Massenat attended Trenton Catholic Academy high school in Hamilton, New Jersey. In his senior year, he led the basketball team to the school's first ever NJSIAA Tournament of Champions title, defeating Camden Catholic High School by a score of 53–39 at the Izod Center on March 23, 2010. That season, Massenat was named the team's Most Valuable Player and earned the honors of a Second Team All-State selection. Academically, Massenat also was a member of the honor roll throughout his four years in high school.

== College ==
In his freshman season at Drexel University, Massenat started every game for the Dragons at point guard, and was named to the Colonial Athletic Association (CAA) All-Rookie Team. During that season, he recorded 11 assists in a game against Niagara, which tied Michael Anderson for the school record for most assists in a game by a freshman.

The following season, Massenat led the CAA in three point percentage (.450), assists per game (4.8), and assist/turnover ratio (2.2). He was named to the CAA All-Tournament Team, and Drexel won the CAA regular season title for the first time in program history.

In his junior season at Drexel, Massenat led the conference in assists per game again with 4.8 and started every game of the season for a third straight year. A career highlight occurred at a game against Hofstra, when Massenat hit a game winning 50-foot three point shot as time expired. The shot was featured on SportsCenter's "Top Ten Plays" the following day.

In this senior year, Massenat received first-team honors for the second time after leading the conference in assists (4.8 apg) and ranking seventh in scoring (17.4 ppg). He also topped the conference and was among the best in Division I in both assist/turnover ratio and total assists.

== Professional career ==
Following his final season at Drexel, Massenat signed with the sports management group Walton Sports. Massenat worked out for the Washington Wizards on June 17, 2014 before going undrafted in the 2014 NBA draft. On July 6, 2014, the Washington Wizards announced that Frantz Massenat was added to their 2014 NBA Las Vegas Summer League roster. However, Massenat would decline the invitation after signing to Mitteldeutscher BC later that week.

=== Mitteldeutscher BC (2014–2016) ===
On July 9, 2014, it was announced that Massenat signed a one-year contract with Mitteldeutscher BC.

=== EWE Baskets (2016–2019) ===
On May 25, 2016, EWE Baskets Oldenburg announced that Massenat signed a 3-year contract with the team.

=== Andorra (2019–2020) ===
On July 4, 2019, Massenat signed with MoraBanc Andorra of the Liga ACB. He averaged 8.4 points and 2.1 rebounds per game in EuroCup.

=== Victoria Libertas Pesaro (2020–2021) ===
On July 21, 2020, he has signed with Victoria Libertas Pesaro of the Italian Lega Basket Serie A (LBA).

=== Saski Baskonia (2021) ===
Pesaro ended the season in the 13th position. Massenat, then, was signed by Saski Baskonia for the ACB Playoffs.

=== Niners Chemnitz (2021–2022) ===
On August 15, 2021, Massenat signed with Niners Chemnitz of the Basketball Bundesliga.

=== JL Bourg (2022–present) ===
He inked a deal with French ProA side JL Bourg on June 29, 2022.

== Coaching career ==
=== Drexel University ===
On August 23, 2023, Drexel announced that the team hired Massenat as an assistant coach.

== National team ==
Massenat, who is of Haitian origin (his parents were born there), was a member of Haiti's men's national team.

== The Basketball tournament ==
Frantz Massenat played for the Talladega Knights in the 2018 edition of The Basketball Tournament. In 4 games, he averaged 11.8 points, 4.8 assists, and 1.5 steals per game. The Knights reached the Northeast Regional Championship before falling to the Golden Eagles.
