= Texas State Bobcats men's basketball statistical leaders =

The Texas State Bobcats basketball statistical leaders are individual statistical leaders of the Texas State Bobcats basketball program in various categories, including points, assists, blocks, rebounds, and steals. Within those areas, the lists identify single-game, single-season, and career leaders. The Bobcats represent Texas State University in the NCAA's Pac-12 Conference.

Texas State began competing in intercollegiate basketball in 1920. However, the school's record book does not generally list records from before the 1950s, as records from before this period are often incomplete and inconsistent. Since scoring was much lower in this era, and teams played much fewer games during a typical season, it is likely that few or no players from this era would appear on these lists anyway.

The NCAA did not officially record assists as a stat until the 1983–84 season, and blocks and steals until the 1985–86 season, but Texas State's record books includes players in these stats before these seasons. These lists are updated through the end of the 2021–22 season.

== Scoring ==
Career
Rk	Player	Points	Seasons
1	Nijal Pearson	2,122	2016–17 2017–18 2018–19 2019–20
2	Charles Sharp	1,884	1956–57 1957–58 1958–59 1959–60
3	Travis Cornett	1,841	1970–71 1971–72 1972–73 1973–74
4	Donte Mathis	1,622	1995–96 1996–97 1997–98 1998–99
5	Brandon Bush	1,569	2005–06 2006–07 2007–08 2008–09
6	Mason Harrell	1,558	2018–19 2019–20 2020–21 2021–22 2022–23
7	Bruce Featherston	1,430	1970–71 1971–72 1972–73 1973–74
8	Kavin Gilder-Tilbury	1,385	2013–14 2014–15 2015–16 2016–17
9	Henry Garcia	1,368	1962–63 1963–64 1964–65 1965–66
10	James Patrick	1,306	1977–78 1978–79 1979–80 1980–81

Season
Rk	Player	Points	Season
1	Charles Sharp	790	1959–60
2	Charles Sharp	731	1958–59
3	Richard Bryant	646	1975–76
4	Travis Cornett	617	1973–74
5	Joel Wright	607	2012–13
6	James Patrick	603	1978–79
7	Nijal Pearson	601	2019–20
8	Willie Terrell	599	1970–71
9	Lynwood Wade	593	1993–94
10	Lewis Gilcrease	592	1952–53

Single game
Rk	Player	Points	Season	Opponent
1	Charles Sharp	53	1959–60	Texas Wesleyan

== Rebounds ==
Career
Rk	Player	Rebounds	Seasons
1	J.C. Maze	1,960	1948–49 1949–50 1950–51 1951–52
2	Gary Mullen	1,009	1965–66 1966–67 1967–68 1968–69
3	Bruce Featherston	977	1970–71 1971–72 1972–73 1973–74
4	Jeff Foster	931	1995–96 1996–97 1997–98 1998–99
5	Travis Cornett	902	1970–71 1971–72 1972–73 1973–74
6	Charles Sharp	799	1956–57 1957–58 1958–59 1959–60
7	Joe Cole	786	1954–55 1955–56 1956–57 1957–58
8	Steve Frontz	751	1974–75 1975–76 1976–77 1977–78
9	Nijal Pearson	739	2016–17 2017–18 2018–19 2019–20
10	Don Forester	696	1956–57 1957–58 1958–59

Season
Rk	Player	Rebounds	Season
1	J.C. Maze	620	1951–52
2	Joe Cole	486	1957–58
3	Don Forester	477	1958–59
4	J.C. Maze	448	1948–49
5	J.C. Maze	446	1950–51
	J.C. Maze	446	1949–50
7	Charles Sharp	365	1959–60
8	Willie Terrell	347	1969–70
9	Charles Sharp	340	1958–59
10	Jeff Foster	316	1998–99
	Bruce Featherston	316	1971–72

Single game
Rk	Player	Rebounds	Season	Opponent
1	Joe Cole	39	1956–57	Texas Lutheran

== Assists ==
Career
Rk	Player	Assists	Seasons
1	Mike Fitzhugh	470	1972–73 1973–74 1974–75 1975–76
2	Ryan White	414	2007–08 2008–09 2009–10 2010–11
3	Mason Harrell	383	2018–19 2019–20 2020–21 2021–22 2022–23
4	David Sykes	338	1999–00 2000–01 2001–02 2002–03
5	Russell Ponds	327	1992–93 1993–94
6	Marlin Davis	298	2016–17 2017–18 2019–20 2020–21
7	Kaden Gumbs	295	2023–24 2024–25 2025–26
8	Gerald Wright	293	1986–87 1987–88
9	Nijal Pearson	292	2016–17 2017–18 2018–19 2019–20
10	Lawrence Fowler	290	1978–79 1979–80 1980–81 1981–82

Season
Rk	Player	Assists	Season
1	Mike Fitzhugh	212	1974–75
2	Gerald Wright	174	1987–88
3	Jaylen Shead	164	2018–19
	Russell Ponds	164	1993–94
5	Russell Ponds	163	1992–93
	Mike Fitzhugh	163	1973–74
7	Corey Jefferson	159	2008–09
8	Ryan White	155	2010–11
9	Stacy Bennett	145	1989–90
10	Ojai Black	144	2016–17

Single game
Rk	Player	Assists	Season	Opponent
1	Stacy Bennett	13	1989–90	SFA

== Steals ==
Career
Rk	Player	Steals	Seasons
1	David Sykes	192	1999–00 2000–01 2001–02 2002–03
2	Wes Davis	189	2011–12 2012–13 2013–14 2014–15
3	Nijal Pearson	177	2016–17 2017–18 2018–19 2019–20
4	Donte Mathis	161	1995–96 1996–97 1997–98 1998–99
5	Ryan White	154	2007–08 2008–09 2009–10 2010–11
6	Mason Harrell	136	2018–19 2019–20 2020–21 2021–22 2022–23
7	Kaden Gumbs	130	2023–24 2024–25 2025–26
8	Kavin Gilder-Tilbury	127	2013–14 2014–15 2015–16 2016–17
9	Brandon Bush	123	2005–06 2006–07 2007–08 2008–09
10	Terry Conerway	114	2002–03 2003–04

Season
Rk	Player	Steals	Season
1	David Sykes	65	2002–03
2	Terry Conerway	64	2002–03
3	David Sykes	62	2001–02
4	Charles Spurlin	61	1980–81
5	Kaden Gumbs	60	2025–26
6	Wes Davis	55	2014–15
	Donte Mathis	55	1998–99
8	Ryan White	54	2010–11
	Brandon Thomas	54	2007–08
	David Sykes	54	2000–01

Single game
Rk	Player	Steals	Season	Opponent
1	Ethan Montalvo	8	2015–16	UTSA
	Wes Davis	8	2011–12	UT Arlington
	Terry Conerway	8	2002–03	Arkansas
	Russell Ponds	8	1992–93	Sam Houston

== Blocks ==
Career
Rk	Player	Blocks	Seasons
1	Jeff Foster	111	1995–96 1996–97 1997–98 1998–99
2	Matt Staff	104	2010–11 2011–12 2012–13
	Torgeir Bryn	104	1987–88 1988–89
4	Brandon Love	87	2021–22 2022–23 2023–24
5	Isiah Small	80	2019–20 2020–21 2021–22
6	Eric Terry	77	2017–18 2018–19 2019–20
7	Patrick Williams	69	1984–85 1985–86 1986–87 1987–88
8	Kavin Gilder-Tilbury	68	2013–14 2014–15 2015–16 2016–17
9	Immanuel King	64	2016–17 2017–18
10	Nighael Ceaser	63	2020–21 2021–22 2022–23

Season
Rk	Player	Blocks	Season
1	Torgeir Bryn	62	1987–88
2	Trevor Cook	53	2005–06
3	Brandon Love	49	2023–24
4	Matt Staff	48	2012–13
5	Tylan Pope	45	2024–25
6	Matt Staff	44	2011–12
7	Torgeir Bryn	42	1988–89
8	Immanuel King	38	2016–17
	Melih Yavsaner	38	2000–01
	Jeff Foster	38	1996–97

Single game
Rk	Player	Blocks	Season	Opponent
1	Trevor Cook	7	2005–06	UT-Pan American
