= 2013–14 Western Kentucky Hilltoppers basketball team =

American college basketball season

2013–14 Western Kentucky Hilltoppers basketball
- Conference: Sun Belt Conference
- Record: 20–12 (12–6 Sun Belt)
- Head coach: Ray Harper (2nd full season)
- Assistant coaches: Lawrence Brenneman; David Boyden; Shawn Forrest
- Home arena: E. A. Diddle Arena

2013–14 Sun Belt Conference men's basketball standings
	Conf.				Overall
Team	W		L	PCT	W		L	PCT
Georgia State	17	–	1	.944	25	–	9	.735
WKU	12	–	6	.667	21	–	11	.656
Louisiana–Lafayette †	11	–	7	.611	23	–	12	.657
Arkansas State	10	–	8	.556	19	–	13	.594
Arkansas–Little Rock	9	–	9	.500	15	–	17	.469
Texas–Arlington	9	–	9	.500	15	–	17	.469
Louisiana–Monroe	7	–	11	.389	10	–	17	.370
Troy	6	–	12	.333	11	–	20	.355
South Alabama	5	–	13	.278	11	–	20	.355
Texas State	4	–	14	.222	8	–	23	.258
† 2014 Sun Belt Conference tournament winner

The 2013–14 Western Kentucky Hilltoppers men's basketball team represented Western Kentucky University during the 2013–14 NCAA Division I men's basketball season. The Hilltoppers were led by head coach Ray Harper in his second full year after coaching the final 19 games in 2011–12. They played their home games at E. A. Diddle Arena and were members of the Sun Belt Conference. They finished the season 20–12, 12–6 in Sun Belt play to finish in second place. They lost in the semifinals of the Sun Belt Conference tournament where they lost to Louisiana–Lafayette. Despite having 20 wins, they did not play in a postseason tournament.

This was their last season as a member of the Sun Belt as they will move to Conference USA in July, 2014.

== Roster ==
2013–14 Western Kentucky Hilltoppers men's basketball team
Players
Coaches

Pos.	#	Name	Height	Weight	Year	Hometown
G	0	Payton Hulsey	6 ft 5 in (1.96 m)	206 lb (93 kg)	Fr	Memphis, Tennessee
G	1	Kevin Kaspar	6 ft 0 in (1.83 m)	176 lb (80 kg)	Jr	Istanbul, Turkey
G	2	Brandon Price	5 ft 9 in (1.75 m)	155 lb (70 kg)	Fr	Radcliff, Kentucky
G	3	Trency Jackson	6 ft 2 in (1.88 m)	190 lb (86 kg)	RS Jr	Jackson, Mississippi
F	10	Caden Dickerson	6 ft 5 in (1.96 m)	205 lb (93 kg)	RS Sr	Argyle, Texas
F	11	Aaron Adeoye	6 ft 7 in (2.01 m)	237 lb (108 kg)	Jr	Marion, Illinois
G	12	Brandon Harris	6 ft 1 in (1.85 m)	173 lb (78 kg)	Sr	Oklahoma City, Oklahoma
F	14	Benjamin Lawson	7 ft 0 in (2.13 m)	210 lb (95 kg)	Fr	Hitchin, England
F	15	O'Karo Akamune	6 ft 7 in (2.01 m)	210 lb (95 kg)	Sr	Miami, Florida
C	20	Aleksej Rostov	6 ft 10 in (2.08 m)	235 lb (107 kg)	So	Riga, Latvia
F	21	Nigel Snipes	6 ft 6 in (1.98 m)	215 lb (98 kg)	RS So	Marietta, Georgia
C	33	Daouda Soumaoro	6 ft 9 in (2.06 m)	235 lb (107 kg)	RS So	Bamako, Mali
F	44	George Fant	6 ft 6 in (1.98 m)	245 lb (111 kg)	Jr	Bowling Green, Kentucky
G	51	Chris Harrison-Docks	5 ft 11 in (1.8 m)	170 lb (77 kg)	RS Fr	Bowling Green, Kentucky
G	52	T. J. Price	6 ft 4 in (1.93 m)	215 lb (98 kg)	Jr	Slidell, Louisiana

Head coach

- Ray Harper (Kentucky Wesleyan)

Assistant coach(es)

- Lawrence Brenneman (Geneva)
- David Boyden (Western Kentucky)
- Shawn Forrest (Arkansas–Pine Bluff)

Legend

- (C) Team captain
- (S) Suspended
- (I) Ineligible
- (W) Walk-on
- Injured
- Current redshirt

Roster
Last update: 2013-11-7

== Schedule ==
Date time, TV	Rank^{#}	Opponent^{#}	Result	Record	Site (attendance) city, state
Exhibition
11/02/2013*; 6:00 pm		Campbellsville	W 87–73		E. A. Diddle Arena (3,106); Bowling Green, KY
Regular season
11/12/2013*; 12:00 am, ESPN2		at Wichita State; ESPN Tip-Off Marathon	L 49–66	0–1	Charles Koch Arena (10,506); Wichita, KS
11/16/2013*; 7:00 pm		East Tennessee State; Roundball Showcase	W 57–50	1–1	E. A. Diddle Arena (5,104); Bowling Green, KY
11/21/2013*; 7:00 pm		UNC Wilmington; Roundball Showcase	W 73–58	2–1	E. A. Diddle Arena (3,837); Bowling Green, KY
11/23/2013*; 7:00 pm		Samford; Roundball Showcase	W 67–64	3–1	E. A. Diddle Arena (4,224); Bowling Green, KY
11/26/2013*; 6:00 pm		at Marshall; Roundball Showcase	L 64–74	3–2	Cam Henderson Center (5,113); Huntington, WV
11/30/2013*; 8:00 pm		Eastern Illinois	W 68–53	4–2	E. A. Diddle Arena (4,527); Bowling Green, KY
12/02/2013*; 6:00 pm, ESPN3		at Bowling Green	L 62–74	4–3	Stroh Center (1,378); Bowling Green, OH
12/07/2013*; 3:00 pm, ESPN3		at Southern Illinois	W 69–60	5–3	SIU Arena (4,164); Carbondale, IL
12/14/2013*; 11:00 am, ESPN2		at No. 6 Louisville	L 63–79 ^{Vacated}	5–4	KFC Yum! Center (22,027); Louisville, KY
12/18/2013*; 7:00 pm, ESPN3		Southern Miss	W 68–65	6–4	E. A. Diddle Arena (3,718); Bowling Green, KY
12/21/2013*; 1:00 pm, ESPN3		Murray State	W 71–64	7–4	E. A. Diddle Arena (4,614); Bowling Green, KY
12/28/2013*; 7:00 pm		Brescia	W 103–65	8–4	E. A. Diddle Arena (3,653); Bowling Green, KY
12/30/2013*; 7:00 pm, ESPN3		Ole Miss	L 74–79	8–5	E. A. Diddle Arena (7,523); Bowling Green, KY
01/02/2014; 5:05 pm, ESPN3		at South Alabama	W 58–56	9–5 (1–0)	Mitchell Center (1,556); Mobile, AL
01/04/2014; 12:00 pm, Sun Belt Network		at Troy	W 60–51	10–5 (2–0)	Trojan Arena (1,035); Troy, AL
01/09/2014; 7:00 pm, ESPN3		Georgia State	L 54–77	10–6 (2–1)	E. A. Diddle Arena (3,971); Bowling Green, KY
01/16/2014; 7:00 pm, ESPN3		Arkansas–Little Rock	L 83–87 ^{OT}	10–7 (2–2)	E. A. Diddle Arena (3,611); Bowling Green, KY
01/18/2014; 7:00 pm, ESPN3		Arkansas State	W 82–77 ^{2OT}	11–7 (3–2)	E. A. Diddle Arena (5,866); Bowling Green, KY
01/23/2014; 7:00 pm, ESPN3		at Louisiana–Monroe	W 69–51	12–7 (4–2)	Fant–Ewing Coliseum (1,528); Monroe, LA
01/25/2014; 4:15 pm, ESPN3		at Louisiana–Lafayette	W 79–70	13–7 (5–2)	Cajundome (4,998); Lafayette, LA
01/30/2014; 7:00 pm, ESPN3		Texas–Arlington	W 77–72	14–7 (6–2)	E. A. Diddle Arena (4,557); Bowling Green, KY
02/01/2014; 7:00 pm, ESPN3		Texas State	W 68–64	15–7 (7–2)	E. A. Diddle Arena (5,514); Bowling Green, KY
02/08/2014; 5:00 pm, Sun Belt Network		at Arkansas–Little Rock	W 79–78	16–7 (8–2)	Jack Stephens Center (3,053); Little Rock, AR
02/10/2014; 7:00 pm, ESPN3		at Arkansas State	L 58–72	16–8 (8–3)	Convocation Center (2,261); Jonesboro, AR
02/13/2014; 7:00 pm, ESPN3		Troy	W 81–76	17–8 (9–3)	E. A. Diddle Arena (4,533); Bowling Green, KY
02/15/2014; 7:00 pm, ESPN3		South Alabama	L 62–69	17–9 (9–4)	E. A. Diddle Arena (4,824); Bowling Green, KY
02/22/2014; 7:00 pm, ESPN3		Louisiana–Monroe	W 72–63	18–9 (10–4)	E. A. Diddle Arena (5,272); Bowling Green, KY
02/27/2014; 7:00 pm		at Texas State	W 51–50	19–9 (11–4)	Strahan Coliseum (1,849); San Marcos, TX
03/01/2014; 7:30 pm		at Texas–Arlington	L 73–80	19–10 (11–5)	College Park Center (1,835); Arlington, TX
03/06/2014; 7:00 pm, ESPN3		Louisiana–Lafayette	W 75–72	20–10 (12–5)	E. A. Diddle Arena (4,810); Bowling Green, KY
03/08/2014; 1:30 pm, ESPN3		at Georgia State	L 55–73	20–11 (12–6)	GSU Sports Arena (3,870); Atlanta, GA
Sun Belt Tournament
03/14/2014; 4:30 pm, Sun Belt Network	(2)	vs. (3) Louisiana–Lafayette; Semifinals	L 72–73	20–12	Lakefront Arena (N/A); New Orleans, LA
*Non-conference game. ^{#}Rankings from AP Poll. (#) Tournament seedings in parentheses. All times are in Central Time; Louisville’s win was later vacated by the NCAA due to recruiting violations by the Louisville basketball program..
