= 2013–14 Arkansas State Red Wolves men's basketball team =

American college basketball season

2013–14 Arkansas State Red Wolves men's basketball
- Conference: Sun Belt Conference
- Record: 19–13 (10–8 Sun Belt)
- Head coach: John Brady (6th season)
- Assistant coaches: Melvin Haralson; Corey Barker; Jeff Clapacs
- Home arena: Convocation Center

2013–14 Sun Belt Conference men's basketball standings
	Conf.				Overall
Team	W		L	PCT	W		L	PCT
Georgia State	17	–	1	.944	25	–	9	.735
WKU	12	–	6	.667	21	–	11	.656
Louisiana–Lafayette †	11	–	7	.611	23	–	12	.657
Arkansas State	10	–	8	.556	19	–	13	.594
Arkansas–Little Rock	9	–	9	.500	15	–	17	.469
Texas–Arlington	9	–	9	.500	15	–	17	.469
Louisiana–Monroe	7	–	11	.389	10	–	17	.370
Troy	6	–	12	.333	11	–	20	.355
South Alabama	5	–	13	.278	11	–	20	.355
Texas State	4	–	14	.222	8	–	23	.258
† 2014 Sun Belt Conference tournament winner

The 2013–14 Arkansas State Red Wolves men's basketball team represented Arkansas State University during the 2013–14 NCAA Division I men's basketball season. The Red Wolves, led by sixth year head coach John Brady, played their home games at the Convocation Center, and were members of the Sun Belt Conference. They finished the season 19–13, 10–8 in Sun Belt play to finish in fourth place. They advanced to the semifinals of the Sun Belt Conference tournament where they lost to Georgia State.

== Roster ==
Number	Name	Position	Height	Weight	Year	Hometown
0	Cameron Golden	Guard	6–0	157	Sophomore	Memphis, Tennessee
1	Rakeem Dickerson	Guard	6–0	178	Junior	Little Rock, Arkansas
3	Brandon Reed	Guard	6–4	182	Senior	Powder Springs, Georgia
4	Josh Pierre	Guard	6–0	184	Sophomore	Baton Rouge, Louisiana
5	P.J. Hardwick	Guard	5–10	162	Sophomore	Miami, Florida
12	Sean Gardner	Guard	6–5	174	Junior	Collierville, Tennessee
14	Kelvin Downs	Forward	6–9	221	Sophomore	Arlington, Texas
20	Kirk Van Slyke	Forward	6–10	228	Senior	The Woodlands, Texas
23	Jammar Sturdivant	Guard	6–0	187	Freshman	Tyronza, Arkansas
24	Ed Townsel	Guard	6–0	171	Senior	Starkville, Mississippi
31	Melvin Johnson III	Guard	6–6	168	Senior	Dallas, Texas
34	Seth Kisler	Forward	6–8	208	Junior	Fort Wayne, Indiana
35	Reaford Worsham	Guard	6–5	190	Sophomore	Waynesboro, Mississippi
40	Kendrick Washington	Forward	6–7	256	Senior	Shreveport, Louisiana

== Schedule ==
Date time, TV	Opponent	Result	Record	Site (attendance) city, state
Exhibition
11/02/2013*; 7:00 pm	Henderson State	W 83–72		Convocation Center (1,471); Jonesboro, AR
11/05/2013*; 7:00 pm	Arkansas–Monticello	W 95–64		Convocation Center (N/A); Jonesboro, AR
Regular season
11/11/2013*; 7:30 pm	at Jackson State	W 65–61	1–0	Williams Assembly Center (998); Jackson, MS
11/13/2013*; 7:00 pm	Tennessee–Martin	W 72–62	2–0	Convocation Center (2,237); Jonesboro, AR
11/16/2013*; 2:00 pm	at Wyoming	L 64–85	2–1	Arena-Auditorium (4,934); Laramie, WY
11/18/2013*; 8:00 pm, Pac-12 Network	at Colorado	L 70–93	2–2	Coors Events Center (8,204); Boulder, CO
11/24/2013*; 2:00 pm	Central Arkansas	W 99–56	3–2	Convocation Center (1,917); Jonesboro, AR
11/30/2013*; 7:00 pm	at Lamar	W 95–89	4–2	Montagne Center (1,668); Beaumont, TX
12/02/2013*; 7:00 pm	Niagara	W 86–61	5–2	Convocation Center (1,645); Jonesboro, AR
12/14/2013*; 3:00 pm, BTN	at Nebraska	L 67–79	5–3	Pinnacle Bank Arena (15,949); Lincoln, NE
12/17/2013*; 7:00 pm	Toledo	L 65–78	5–4	Convocation Center (2,077); Jonesboro, AR
12/21/2013*; 6:00 pm	at Marshall	W 83–82	6–4	Cam Henderson Center (4,718); Huntington, WV
12/30/2013*; 7:00 pm	Southern Arkansas	W 91–66	7–4	Convocation Center (2,027); Jonesboro, AR
01/02/2014; 7:30 pm	at Texas–Arlington	W 82–66	8–4 (1–0)	College Park Center (1,412); Arlington, TX
01/04/2014; 4:30 pm	at Texas State	W 74–69	9–4 (2–0)	Strahan Coliseum (1,606); San Marcos, TX
01/09/2014; 7:00 pm	Troy	L 84–98	9–5 (2–1)	Convocation Center (2,037); Jonesboro, AR
01/11/2014; 7:00 pm	South Alabama	W 72–60	10–5 (3–1)	Convocation Center (4,344); Jonesboro, AR
01/16/2014; 6:00 pm	at Georgia State	L 72–73	10–6 (3–2)	GSU Sports Arena (2,089); Atlanta, GA
01/18/2014; 7:00 pm	at Western Kentucky	L 77–82 ^{2OT}	10–7 (3–3)	E. A. Diddle Arena (5,866); Bowling Green, KY
01/25/2014; 7:00 pm	Arkansas–Little Rock	W 77–49	11–7 (4–3)	Convocation Center (5,631); Jonesboro, AR
01/30/2014; 7:00 pm	at Louisiana–Monroe	L 65–72	11–8 (4–4)	Fant–Ewing Coliseum (1,186); Monroe, LA
02/01/2014; 7:30 pm	at Troy	W 83–73	12–8 (5–4)	Trojan Arena (1,977); Troy, AL
02/10/2014; 7:00 pm	Western Kentucky	W 72–58	13–8 (6–4)	Convocation Center (2,261); Jonesboro, AR
02/13/2014; 7:00 pm	at South Alabama	W 85–61	14–8 (7–4)	Mitchell Center (1,872); Mobile, AL
02/15/2014; 7:15 pm	at Louisiana–Lafayette	L 67–85	14–9 (7–5)	Cajundome (4,223); Lafayette, LA
02/20/2014; 7:00 pm	Texas–Arlington	W 83–60	15–9 (8–5)	Convocation Center (2,115); Jonesboro, AR
02/22/2014; 7:00 pm	Texas State	W 73–68	16–9 (9–5)	Convocation Center (2,651); Jonesboro, AR
02/25/2014*; 7:00 pm	Lyon; Postponed from 2/4 due to weather	W 65–39	17–9	Convocation Center (1,682); Jonesboro, AR
03/01/2014; 7:00 pm	at Arkansas–Little Rock	L 67–74	17–10 (9–6)	Jack Stephens Center (4,895); Little Rock, AR
03/04/2014; 7:00 pm	Georgia State	L 76–79 ^{OT}	17–11 (9–7)	Convocation Center (1,884); Jonesboro, AR
03/06/2014; 7:00 pm	Louisiana–Monroe	W 64–58	18–11 (10–7)	Convocation Center (2,329); Jonesboro, AR
03/08/2014; 7:00 pm	Louisiana–Lafayette	L 76–77	18–12 (10–8)	Convocation Center (3,275); Jonesboro, AR
2014 Sun Belt tournament
03/14/2014; 6:00 pm, Sun Belt Network	vs. Arkansas–Little Rock; Quarterfinals	W 116–114 ^{4OT}	19–12	Lakefront Arena (N/A); New Orleans, LA
03/15/2014; 2:00 pm, Sun Belt Network	vs. Georgia State; Semifinals	L 45–72	19–13	Lakefront Arena (N/A); New Orleans, LA
*Non-conference game. ^{#}Rankings from AP Poll. (#) Tournament seedings in parentheses. All times are in Central Time.
