= 2013–14 Troy Trojans men's basketball team =

American college basketball season

2013–14 Troy Trojans men's basketball
- Conference: Sun Belt Conference
- Record: 11–20 (6–12 Sun Belt)
- Head coach: Phil Cunningham (1st season)
- Assistant coaches: Marcus Grant; Ben Fletcher; Billy Begley
- Home arena: Trojan Arena

2013–14 Sun Belt Conference men's basketball standings
	Conf.				Overall
Team	W		L	PCT	W		L	PCT
Georgia State	17	–	1	.944	25	–	9	.735
WKU	12	–	6	.667	21	–	11	.656
Louisiana–Lafayette †	11	–	7	.611	23	–	12	.657
Arkansas State	10	–	8	.556	19	–	13	.594
Arkansas–Little Rock	9	–	9	.500	15	–	17	.469
Texas–Arlington	9	–	9	.500	15	–	17	.469
Louisiana–Monroe	7	–	11	.389	10	–	17	.370
Troy	6	–	12	.333	11	–	20	.355
South Alabama	5	–	13	.278	11	–	20	.355
Texas State	4	–	14	.222	8	–	23	.258
† 2014 Sun Belt Conference tournament winner

The 2013–14 Troy Trojans men's basketball team represented Troy University during the 2013–14 NCAA Division I men's basketball season. The Trojans, led by first year head coach Phil Cunningham, played their home games at Trojan Arena and were members of the Sun Belt Conference. They finished the season 11–20, 6–12 in Sun Belt play to finish in eighth place. They lost in the first round of the Sun Belt Conference tournament to Arkansas–Little Rock.

== Roster ==
Number	Name	Position	Height	Weight	Year	Hometown
1	Antoine Myers	Guard	6–3	190	Senior	Baltimore, Maryland
2	Deonata Jethroe	Guard/Forward	6–4	230	RS–Junior	Columbus, Mississippi
3	Jeff Mullahey	Guard	6–3	185	Senior	Pace, Florida
4	Kelton Ford	Guard	6–0	180	Freshman	Monroeville, Alabama
5	Jordan Howard	Guard	5–11	180	RS–Freshman	Monroeville, Alabama
10	Phillip Coleman	Guard	6–3	188	Freshman	Samson, Alabama
11	Hunter Williams	Guard	6–0	180	Senior	Ocala, Florida
12	JC Bonny	Guard	6–2	180	Junior	Lawrenceville, Georgia
14	Jaro Moravek	Forward/Center	6–8	232	Freshman	Handlová, Slovakia
21	John Walton	Forward	6–7	220	Junior	Memphis, Tennessee
22	Tevin Calhoun	Forward	6–7	209	Senior	Linden, New Jersey
25	Kevin Thomas	Forward	6–8	215	Junior	Ajax, Ontario
32	Josh Warren	Center	6–9	220	Senior	Orlando, Florida
33	Wes Hinton	Forward/Center	6–8	205	RS–Senior	Lawrenceville, Georgia
44	Hobie Hughes	Center	6–9	250	Freshman	Andalusia, Alabama

== Schedule ==
Date time, TV	Opponent	Result	Record	Site (attendance) city, state
Exhibition
10/29/2013*; 7:00 pm	Victory	W 105–68		Trojan Arena (732); Troy, AL
Regular season
11/08/2013*; 7:30 pm	at Ole Miss	L 54–69	0–1	Tad Smith Coliseum (6,809); Oxford, MS
11/11/2013*; 7:30 pm	LaGrange	W 102–69	1–1	Trojan Arena (1,158); Troy, AL
11/14/2013*; 7:00 pm	at UAB	L 69–81	1–2	Bartow Arena (3,412); Birmingham, AL
11/19/2013*; 7:00 pm	Nicholls State	W 77–62	2–2	Trojan Arena (1,096); Troy, AL
11/26/2013*; 7:00 pm	at Central Arkansas	L 53–60	2–3	Farris Center (746); Conway, AR
12/02/2013*; 7:00 pm	Alcorn State	W 73–70 ^{2OT}	3–3	Trojan Arena (985); Troy, AL
12/07/2013*; 1:00 pm	Alabama State	W 85–69	4–3	Trojan Arena (1,265); Troy, AL
12/15/2013*; 5:00 pm	at Kansas State	L 43–72	4–4	Bramlage Coliseum (11,862); Manhattan, KS
12/19/2013*; 6:30 pm	vs. UC Santa Barbara; Basketball Travelers Classic	L 54–57	4–5	Smith Spectrum (N/A); Logan, UT
12/20/2013*; 6:30 pm	vs. Western Illinois; Basketball Travelers Classic	L 58–61	4–6	Smith Spectrum (1,760); Logan, UT
12/21/2013*; 9:00 pm	at Utah State; Basketball Travelers Classic	L 50–71	4–7	Smith Spectrum (9,704); Logan, UT
12/28/2013*; 1:00 pm	Belhaven	W 74–62	5–7	Trojan Arena (828); Troy, AL
01/02/2014; 6:00 pm	at Georgia State	L 72–81	5–8 (0–1)	GSU Sports Arena (1,436); Atlanta, GA
01/04/2013; 12:00 pm, Sun Belt Network	WKU	L 51–60	5–9 (0–2)	Trojan Arena (1,035); Troy, AL
01/09/2014; 7:00 pm	at Arkansas State	W 98–84	6–9 (1–2)	Convocation Center (2,037); Jonesboro, AR
01/11/2014; 7:00 pm	at Arkansas–Little Rock	W 75–62	7–9 (2–2)	Jack Stephens Center (3,441); Little Rock, AR
01/16/2013; 7:30 pm	Louisiana–Monroe	L 64–75	7–10 (2–3)	Trojan Arena (2,038); Troy, AL
01/18/2013; 7:30 pm	Louisiana–Lafayette	L 59–72	7–11 (2–4)	Trojan Arena (1,738); Troy, AL
01/23/2014; 8:00 pm, Sun Belt Network	at Texas–Arlington	L 56–59	7–12 (2–5)	College Park Center (2,247); Arlington, TX
01/25/2014; 4:30 pm	at Texas State	L 65–73	7–13 (2–6)	Strahan Coliseum (2,059); San Marcos, TX
02/01/2013; 7:30 pm	Arkansas State	L 73–83	7–14 (2–7)	Trojan Arena (1,977); Troy, AL
02/06/2013; 7:30 pm	South Alabama	W 79–74	8–14 (3–7)	Trojan Arena (2,051); Troy, AL
02/13/2014; 7:00 pm, ESPN3	at WKU	L 76–81	8–15 (3–8)	E. A. Diddle Arena (4,533); Bowling Green, KY
02/15/2013; 7:30 pm	Georgia State	W 85–81	9–15 (4–8)	Trojan Arena (2,774); Troy, AL
02/20/2014; 7:00 pm	at Louisiana–Lafayette	L 63–78	9–16 (4–9)	Cajundome (3,466); Lafayette, LA
02/22/2014; 7:00 pm	at South Alabama	L 78–86	9–17 (4–10)	Mitchell Center (3,414); Mobile, AL
02/27/2013; 7:00 pm	Arkansas–Little Rock	L 55–62	9–18 (4–11)	Trojan Arena (1,083); Troy, AL
03/01/2014; 4:00 pm	at Louisiana–Monroe	W 61–46	10–18 (5–11)	Fant–Ewing Coliseum (1,376); Monroe, LA
03/06/2013; 7:00 pm	Texas–Arlington	L 86–87	10–19 (5–12)	Trojan Arena (1,157); Troy, AL
03/08/2013; 7:30 pm	Texas State	W 72–50	11–19 (6–12)	Trojan Arena (1,849); Troy, AL
Sun Belt tournament
03/13/2014; 6:00 pm, Sun Belt Network	vs. Arkansas–Little Rock; First round	L 61–74	11–20	Lakefront Arena (N/A); New Orleans, LA
*Non-conference game. ^{#}Rankings from AP Poll. (#) Tournament seedings in parentheses. All times are in Central Time.
