= 2013–14 Arkansas–Little Rock Trojans men's basketball team =

American college basketball season

2013–14 Arkansas–Little Rock Trojans men's basketball
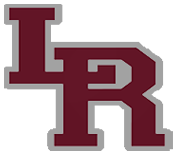
- Conference: Sun Belt Conference
- Record: 15–17 (9–9 Sun Belt)
- Head coach: Steve Shields (11th season)
- Assistant coaches: Joe Kleine; Charles Cunningham; Robert Lee
- Home arena: Jack Stephens Center

2013–14 Sun Belt Conference men's basketball standings
	Conf.				Overall
Team	W		L	PCT	W		L	PCT
Georgia State	17	–	1	.944	25	–	9	.735
WKU	12	–	6	.667	21	–	11	.656
Louisiana–Lafayette †	11	–	7	.611	23	–	12	.657
Arkansas State	10	–	8	.556	19	–	13	.594
Arkansas–Little Rock	9	–	9	.500	15	–	17	.469
Texas–Arlington	9	–	9	.500	15	–	17	.469
Louisiana–Monroe	7	–	11	.389	10	–	17	.370
Troy	6	–	12	.333	11	–	20	.355
South Alabama	5	–	13	.278	11	–	20	.355
Texas State	4	–	14	.222	8	–	23	.258
† 2014 Sun Belt Conference tournament winner

The 2013–14 Arkansas–Little Rock Trojans men's basketball team represented the University of Arkansas at Little Rock during the 2013–14 NCAA Division I men's basketball season. The Trojans, led by eleventh year head coach Steve Shields, played their home games at the Jack Stephens Center, and are members of the Sun Belt Conference. They finished the season 15–17, 9–9 in Sun Belt play to finish in a tie for fifth place. They advanced to the quarterfinals of the Sun Belt Conference tournament where they lost Arkansas State.

== Roster ==
Number	Name	Position	Height	Weight	Year	Hometown
1	Leroy Isler	Guard/Forward	6–5	204	Senior	Brooklyn, New York
2	Keith Beasley	Guard	6–5	215	Junior	Dallas, Texas
3	Josh Hagins	Guard	6–1	175	Sophomore	Bossier City, Louisiana
5	Kemy Osse	Guard	6–1	208	Sophomore	Montreal, Quebec
10	Maurius Hill	Forward	6–5	220	Freshman	Homewood, Illinois
11	DeVonte Smith	Guard	5–11	165	Junior	Oklahoma City, Oklahoma
14	J.T. Thomas	Guard	6–1	180	RS–Junior	New Orleans, Louisiana
15	Stetson Billings	Forward	6–5	192	Sophomore	Strong, Arkansas
21	Mareik Isom	Guard/Forward	6–7	208	RS–Freshman	Austin, Texas
23	Will Neighbour	Forward	6–10	225	Senior	Grayshott, England
24	Ben Dillard	Guard	6–2	185	Junior	Frisco, Texas
33	James White	Forward	6–8	216	RS–Sophomore	Jonesboro, Georgia
50	Andrew Poulter	Center	6–11	266	RS–Freshman	New Braunfels, Texas
55	Gus Leeper	Forward	6–10	237	RS–Junior	Austin, Texas

== Schedule ==
Date time, TV	Opponent	Result	Record	Site (attendance) city, state
Regular season
11/11/2013*; 7:00 pm	North Florida; Global Sports Challenge	L 70–72	0–1	Jack Stephens Center (3,012); Little Rock, AR
11/16/2013*; 3:30 pm, Sun Sports	at No. 11 Florida; Global Sports Challenge	L 56–86	0–2	O'Connell Center (8,843); Gainesville, FL
11/18/2013*; 7:00 pm, ESPN3	at Middle Tennessee; Global Sports Challenge	L 59–76	0–3	Murphy Center (4,102); Murfreesboro, TN
11/22/2013*; 7:00 pm	at Southern; Global Sports Challenge	W 85–82 ^{OT}	1–3	F. G. Clark Center (1,381); Baton Rouge, LA
11/26/2013*; 7:00 pm	Southern Arkansas	W 90–58	2–3	Jack Stephens Center (2,842); Little Rock, AR
11/29/2013*; 2:00 pm	at Oklahoma	L 81–101	2–4	Lloyd Noble Center (4,975); Norman, OK
12/03/2013*; 7:00 pm	UA Fort Smith	W 88–74	3–4	Jack Stephens Center (3,048); Little Rock, AR
12/10/2013*; 7:00 pm	at Tulsa	L 64–78	3–5	Reynolds Center (3,780); Tulsa, OK
12/13/2013*; 7:00 pm, ESPN3	at No. 16 Memphis	L 59–73	3–6	FedExForum (15,821); Memphis, TN
12/20/2013*; 6:00 pm	vs. Jacksonville State; BVI Tropical Shootout	W 75–70	4–6	Multipurpose Sports Complex (N/A); Tortola, BVI
12/21/2013*; 7:00 pm	vs. Southern Miss; BVI Tropical Shootout	L 60–74	4–7	Multipurpose Sports Complex (N/A); Tortola, BVI
12/30/2013*; 7:00 pm	Grambling State	W 88–68	5–7	Jack Stephens Center (2,813); Little Rock, AR
01/02/2014; 7:30 pm	at Texas State	W 63–59	6–7 (1–0)	Strahan Coliseum (1,595); San Marcos, TX
01/02/2014; 5:00 pm	at Texas–Arlington	W 72–70	7–7 (2–0)	College Park Center (1,875); Arlington, TX
01/09/2014; 7:00 pm	South Alabama	W 65–60	8–7 (3–0)	Jack Stephens Center (2,785); Little Rock, AR
01/11/2014; 7:00 pm	Troy	L 62–75	8–8 (3–1)	Jack Stephens Center (3,441); Little Rock, AR
01/16/2014; 7:00 pm, ESPN3	at WKU	W 87–83 ^{OT}	9–8 (4–1)	E. A. Diddle Arena (3,611); Bowling Green, KY
01/18/2014; 1:30 pm	at Georgia State	L 73–99	9–9 (4–2)	GSU Sports Arena (1,859); Atlanta, GA
01/23/2014; 7:00 pm	Texas State	W 69–64	10–9 (5–2)	Jack Stephens Center (3,038); Little Rock, AR
01/25/2014; 7:00 pm	at Arkansas State	L 49–77	10–10 (5–3)	Convocation Center (5,631); Jonesboro, AR
01/30/2014; 7:00 pm	Louisiana–Lafayette	W 80–69	11–10 (6–3)	Jack Stephens Center (3,412); Little Rock, AR
02/01/2014; 4:00 pm	at South Alabama	W 62–58	12–10 (7–3)	Mitchell Center (3,542); Mobile, AL
02/06/2014; 7:00 pm	Georgia State	L 57–68	12–11 (7–4)	Jack Stephens Center (3,038); Little Rock, AR
02/08/2014; 5:00 pm, CSS	WKU	L 78–79	12–12 (7–5)	Jack Stephens Center (3,053); Little Rock, AR
02/13/2014; 7:05 pm	at Louisiana–Lafayette	L 87–93 ^{2OT}	12–13 (7–6)	Cajundome (3,624); Lafayette, LA
02/15/2014; 2:00 pm	at Louisiana–Monroe	L 49–65	12–14 (7–7)	Fant–Ewing Coliseum (1,058); Monroe, LA
02/22/2014; 7:00 pm	Texas–Arlington	L 71–75	12–15 (7–8)	Jack Stephens Center (3,861); Little Rock, AR
02/27/2014; 7:00 pm	at Troy	W 62–55	13–15 (8–8)	Trojan Arena (1,083); Troy, AL
03/01/2014; 7:00 pm	Arkansas State	W 74–67	14–15 (9–8)	Jack Stephens Center (4,895); Little Rock, AR
03/08/2014; 7:00 pm	Louisiana–Monroe	L 65–66	14–16 (9–9)	Jack Stephens Center (4,437); Little Rock, AR
2014 Sun Belt tournament
03/13/2014; 6:00 pm, Sun Belt Network	vs. Troy; First round	W 74–61	15–16	Lakefront Arena (N/A); New Orleans, LA
03/14/2014; 6:00 pm, Sun Belt Network	vs. Arkansas State; Quarterfinals	L 114–116 ^{4OT}	15–17	Lakefront Arena (N/A); New Orleans, LA
*Non-conference game. ^{#}Rankings from AP Poll. (#) Tournament seedings in parentheses. All times are in Central Time.
