= Ryan Harrow =

American basketball player (born 1991)

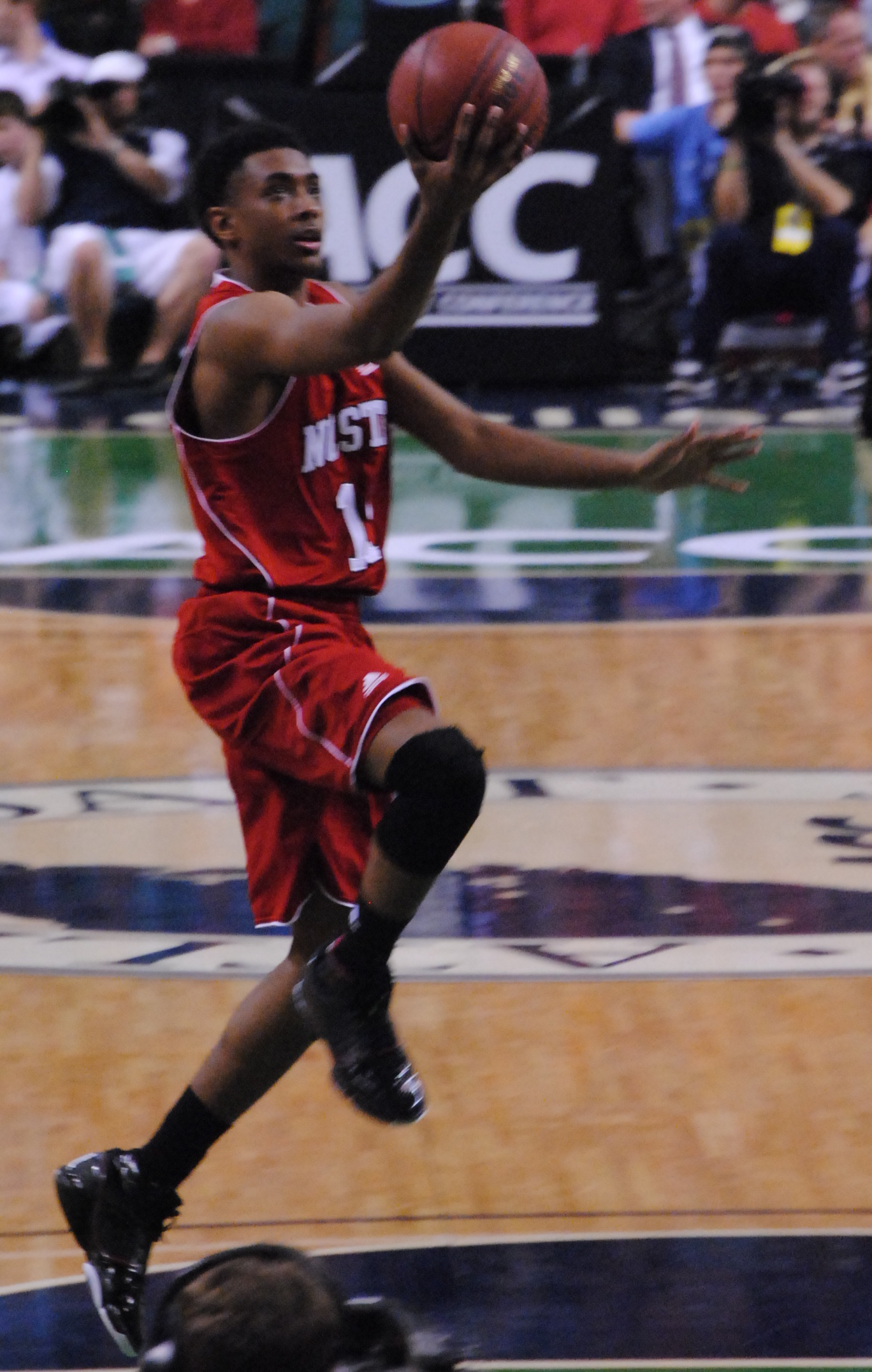
- Harrow playing for NC State

Personal information
- Born: April 22, 1991 (age 35) Fort Lauderdale, Florida, U.S.
- Listed height: 6 ft 0 in (1.83 m)
- Listed weight: 161 lb (73 kg)

Career information
- High school: Walton (Marietta, Georgia)
- College: NC State (2010–2011); Kentucky (2012–2013); Georgia State (2013–2015)
- NBA draft: 2015: undrafted
- Playing career: 2015–present
- Position: Point guard

Career history
- 2015–2016: Rethymno Cretan Kings
- 2016–2017: Victoria Libertas Pesaro
- 2017: Rosa Radom
- 2017: Pieno žvaigždės
- 2017–2018: Rosa Radom
- 2018–2019: Peristeri
- 2020: Real Betis
- 2020–2021: Peristeri
- 2021–2022: Béliers de Kemper
- 2022: BC Balkan Botevgrad

Career highlights
- 2× First-team All-Sun Belt (2014, 2015); Third-team Parade All-American (2010)

Ryan Harrow (born April 22, 1991) is an American professional basketball player. Harrow finished his NCAA college career with the Georgia State Panthers, and is regarded as one of the greatest Panther basketball players ever. He plays the point guard position.

== Prep career ==
Harrow played for Walton High School in Marietta, Georgia. As a junior, he averaged 27.8 points, 6.0 assists, and 3.1 steals. That year, he was named a Georgia 5A all-state first-team selection and Mr. Cobb County Basketball. His senior year, he averaged a county-high 31.4 points and was named the Georgia Gatorade Player of the Year, the Georgia 5A Player of the Year, and Mr. Cobb County Basketball for the second time. Harrow finished with more than 2,000 career points in just three years at Walton (he played a portion of his sophomore year at Concord (N.C.) Cannon School). Coming out of high school, Harrow was ranked the 25th-best overall prospect by Scout.com, the No. 8 point guard, and a five-star prospect. According to Rivals.com, he was ranked the No. 19 player nationally and No. 7 point guard. He was also ranked No. 39 on the ESPNU 100 list.

== Collegiate career ==
=== NC State ===
In his freshman year at NC State, Harrow appeared in 29 games and started in 10. He earned his first career start at Florida State, in which he scored 17 points in 21 minutes of play. Named the ACC Rookie of the Week on December 15, 2010 after his performance against USC Upstate where he came off the bench to score a then career-best 20 points, adding three steals, five assists, and no turnovers. He finished the year tied for fourth on the team in scoring (9.3 PPG) and second in assists per game (3.3). Harrow ranked seventh in the ACC in assist-to-turnover ratio (1.9).

At the end of his freshman season, Harrow, discontent with the NC State's dismissal of coach Sidney Lowe, requested a release from his NC State scholarship to pursue other options. The agreement was that he must choose a school outside the ACC.

=== Kentucky ===
After his transfer to Kentucky, Harrow was required to sit out of games for the 2011–12 season due to NCAA transfer regulations. That season, Kentucky went on to win the NCAA National Championship.

==== 2012–13 ====
Before the season, in June 2012, Ryan Harrow learned that his father had suffered a stroke. His mother called to tell him the news as he was leaving from a summer basketball workout. Harrow flew to Atlanta to be with his parents and says he did not want to return to Kentucky, but did at the insistence of his parents. The failing health of his father loomed over Harrow during the following season. "He would be really emotional, and I tried to be strong," Harrow said in an interview. "But at the same time, it was wearing on me. I think almost every game, I played with pain. 'What's up with my Dad? Who knows what's going to happen next?'"

Harrow had a slow start to his sophomore season, seeing just 10 minutes of play in the season-opener against Maryland due to reported flu-like symptoms. He would completely sit out the following four games. Playing time started to pick back up through non-conference games against Notre Dame and Baylor. He scored in double-figures in 18 of his last 24 games. Harrow showed promise in an early non-conference game against Eastern Michigan in which he totaled 15 points shooting 4-of-5 from 3-point range, grabbed four steals, and reached a season-high eight assists. He followed that game by scoring a team-high 16 points in SEC debut victory over Vanderbilt with four rebounds and four assists. He had a perfect shooting game in win over South Carolina going 6-of-6 from the field. Harrow pulled down a then career-high eight rebounds in a win against Missouri in which he also totaled 16 points and six assists. He led all scorers with 19 points in a win over Mississippi State while grabbing seven rebounds and dishing a game-high four assists.

The season did not end on such a high note though. After receiving a bye to the quarterfinals of the SEC tournament, Kentucky lost that game to Vanderbilt. Showing a great deal of emotion, Harrow blamed himself while fighting tears in post game interviews. Kentucky was later eliminated by Robert Morris in the NIT's opening round. Two weeks later, Harrow announced that he would be transferring universities to be with his father. "I really tried not to think about it until the season was all the way over," Harrow said. "It was a hard decision because I knew how good Kentucky was going to be this season." Ryan's father was his only family member still living in Atlanta, and he felt like he needed to be there with him. "We have a saying in my family, 'Family First'," Harrow said. "We've all got that tattooed on us. My dad is the only one in Atlanta, and with the struggles that he's going through, I just thought that it would be best for me to come back and help him with whatever he needed."

Head coach, John Calipari, said in a statement, "Given the health of his dad, we fully support Ryan's decision to transfer to Georgia State to be closer to his family in Atlanta. Ryan was a vital part of this year's team and an important player in practice during our 2011–12 national championship run. I want to thank Ryan for his efforts and hard work and wish him the best of luck at Georgia State. I know the Big Blue Nation will keep a close eye on him and wish him well as he continues his basketball career and his pursuit of a college degree."

=== Georgia State ===
==== 2013–14 ====
Ryan Harrow earned All-Sun Belt First-Team honors and Sun Belt All-Tournament recognition in his first season at Georgia State. He also earned NABC All-District 24 Region honors. And he was named Sun Belt Player of the Week on November 19, 2013.

Finished the season with 20 or more points in a game 15 times and also had three games of 30 or more. Harrow scored 27 points at old foe, Vanderbilt, to earn Sun Belt Player-of-the-Week honors. Finished with 34 points against Elon, pulling down four rebounds and dishing out four assists. Scored 33 points, making 14-of-15 free throws in win over Old Dominion. Totaled 19 points and eight assists at USTA, going a perfect 8-of-8 from the free throw line. Dished out nine assists, just one shy of a career-high to go along with 24 points in victory at East Carolina. Finished with 18 points, seven assists and five rebounds, going 7-of-7 from the free throw line in win over UL Lafayette. Scored 20 points on 9-of-14 shooting in the Sun Belt tournament opener against Arkansas State. Finished the season with a career-high 37 points, going 11-of-12 from the free throw line in an 81–82 overtime loss to UL Lafayette in the Sun Belt championship game.

GSU finished that year as regular season Sun Belt Conference champs with a 17–1 SBC record. Harrow finished with 604 points, tied for the fourth most in program history, averaging 17.9 points per game. He set a GSU school record with 222 made field goals. Harrow also totaled 144 assists, tied for seventh-most in program history. He went 130-of-155 (83.9%) from the free throw line, the eighth-best mark in GSU history and third in the Sun Belt that season. Harrow went on a streak of 24 straight free throws, then the second-longest stretch in program history.

==== 2014–15 ====
In his final season, Harrow again earned All-Sun Belt First-Team and NABC All-District 24 Region honors. He was named the 2015 Atlanta Tipoff Club Georgia College Player of the Year. He earned Sun Belt Player of the Week on February 4, 2015. And Harrow was invited to the Portsmouth Invitational Tournament as one of the top 64 seniors in the country following the season.

Finished the season with 20 or more points in a game 16 times, including a season-high 31 against UL Monroe which included a career-high seven 3-pointers. Harrow finished with a team-high 26 points at Colorado State. He scored another team-high 23 points on 8-of-11 shooting against Chicago State in the CBE Hall of Fame Classic. In that same tournament, Harrow recorded a double-double with 14 points and 11 assists in victory over Western Carolina. He scored 27 points, knocking down five 3-pointers in a win over Southern Miss. A huge blow to Georgia State's post-season hopes, Harrow suffered a hamstring injury in GSU's final regular season game in which they claimed the SBC regular season championship. As a result, he was forced to sit out of their SBC tournament championship run as well as their NCAA tournament win over the 3 seed, Baylor. Harrow returned to play 19 first-half minutes in the NCAA Tournament third-round game against No. 6 Xavier, scoring six points on a pair of 3-pointers, but had to sit out again in the second half. GSU lost that game 67–75 to end their memorable season.

GSU finished as both the regular season and tournament champions in the Sun Belt Conference. Personally, Harrow reached 1,000 points in a GSU uniform in just 54 games, the second-quickest in program history–quicker than teammate, R. J. Hunter, by one game. Harrow was averaging 20.7 points per game before his hamstring injury that sidelined him for most of the final few games. He finished the season averaging 18.3 points per game (second in the Sun Belt) and finished the season with 530 points scored, 11th-most in school history, despite missing basically nine games over the course of the season. Harrow made 208 field goals, sixth-most in school history and just 14 shy of the school record he set in the previous season.

=== College statistics ===
Season Averages
Season	Team	GP	MPG	PTS	REB	AST	STL	FG%	3P%	FT%	TO	A/TO
2010–11	NC State Wolfpack	29	23	9.3	1.9	3.3	.8	.390	.222	.870	1.8	1.9
2011–12*	Kentucky Wildcats	–	–	–	–	–	–	–	–	–	–	–
2012–13	Kentucky Wildcats	29	27.1	9.9	2.8	2.8	.7	.414	.296	.708	1.7	1.7
2013–14	Georgia State Panthers	34	33.9	17.8	2.6	4.2	1.3	.446	.288	.839	1.7	2.5
2014–15	Georgia State Panthers	29	31.8	18.3	2.1	3.6	1.5	.504	.394	.717	1.9	1.9
Career		121	29	13.8	2.4	3.5	1.1	.439	.300	.784	1.8	2.0

(*) Did not play the 2011–12 season due to NCAA transfer regulations.

=== College records ===
- Single-season Georgia State University leader in field goals made (222, 2013–14)

== Professional career ==
After going undrafted in the 2015 NBA draft, Harrow signed his first professional contract with Rethymno Cretan Kings of the Greek Basket League on July 24, 2015. For the 2016–17 season, Harrow signed with Victoria Libertas Pesaro in Italy. On March 13, 2017, he left Pesaro and joined Rosa Radom of the PLK until the end of the season. He signed with BC Pieno žvaigždės of Lithuania during the summer of 2017. After just five games, he left and again signed with Rosa Radom. On July 16, 2018, Harrow signed with Peristeri of the Greek Basket League. He left the Greek team on April 12, 2019, after a successful season for both him and the club. On August 21, 2020, Harrow signed with Coosur Real Betis of the Spanish Liga ACB. In seven games, he averaged 8.0 points, 1.0 rebound, 1.9 assists and 1.0 steal per game. On November 30, 2020, he agreed to return to Peristeri. On August 2, 2021, Harrow signed with Béliers de Kemper of the LNB Pro B.

== Personal life ==
Ryan Harrow's family includes his mother, Fern Matthews, and his father, Mark Harrow.
