= 2013–14 Louisiana–Monroe Warhawks men's basketball team =

American college basketball season

2013–14 Louisiana–Monroe Warhawks men's basketball
- Conference: Sun Belt Conference
- Record: 10–17 (7–11 Sun Belt)
- Head coach: Keith Richard (4th season)
- Assistant coaches: Lonnie Cooper; Ryan Cross; Cord Wright
- Home arena: Fant–Ewing Coliseum

2013–14 Sun Belt Conference men's basketball standings
	Conf.				Overall
Team	W		L	PCT	W		L	PCT
Georgia State	17	–	1	.944	25	–	9	.735
WKU	12	–	6	.667	21	–	11	.656
Louisiana–Lafayette †	11	–	7	.611	23	–	12	.657
Arkansas State	10	–	8	.556	19	–	13	.594
Arkansas–Little Rock	9	–	9	.500	15	–	17	.469
Texas–Arlington	9	–	9	.500	15	–	17	.469
Louisiana–Monroe	7	–	11	.389	10	–	17	.370
Troy	6	–	12	.333	11	–	20	.355
South Alabama	5	–	13	.278	11	–	20	.355
Texas State	4	–	14	.222	8	–	23	.258
† 2014 Sun Belt Conference tournament winner

The 2013–14 Louisiana–Monroe Warhawks men's basketball team represented the University of Louisiana at Monroe in the 2013–14 NCAA Division I men's basketball season. The Warhawks, led by fourth year head coach Keith Richard, played their home games at Fant–Ewing Coliseum and were members of the Sun Belt Conference. They finished the season 10–17, 7–11 in Sun Belt play to finish in seventh place. They lost in the first round of the Sun Belt tournament to Texas–Arlington.

== Roster ==
Number	Name	Position	Height	Weight	Year	Hometown
0	Marvin Williams	Center	6–8	250	Junior	Memphis, Tennessee
1	Jayon James	Forward	6–6	225	Senior	Paterson, New Jersey
2	DeMondre Harvey	Forward	6–7	210	Sophomore	Minden, Louisiana
3	Marcelis Hansberry	Guard	6–0	185	Senior	Jackson, Mississippi
4	R.J. McCray	Guard	6–2	190	Senior	Arlington, Texas
10	Amos Olatayo	Guard	6–4	200	Senior	Alief, Texas
11	Nick Coppola	Guard	6–0	175	Freshman	Richmond, Virginia
12	Tylor Ongwae	Forward	6–6	210	Junior	Eldoret, Kenya
13	Kolby, Bassingthwaite	Guard	6–3	190	Junior	Rancho Cucamonga, California
15	Kyle Koszuta	Guard	6–2	180	Sophomore	Niceville, Florida
23	Millaun Brown	Forward	6–7	220	Junior	Gunnison, Mississippi
24	Taylor Birchett	Guard	6–4	185	Freshman	Roswell, Georgia
35	Colton Ponder	Forward	6–5	215	Sophomore	Shreveport, Louisiana

== Schedule ==
Date time, TV	Opponent	Result	Record	Site (attendance) city, state
Regular season
11/08/2013*; 7:00 pm, ESPN3	at No. 5 Kansas	L 63–80	0–1	Allen Fieldhouse (16,300); Lawrence, Kansas
11/18/2013*; 7:00 pm	Samford	W 86–52	1–1	Fant–Ewing Coliseum (1,503); Monroe, Louisiana
11/21/2013*; 7:00 pm	at Northwestern State	W 84–80 ^{OT}	2–1	Prather Coliseum (1,723); Natchitoches, Louisiana
12/09/2013; 7:00 pm	Thomas	W 84–61	3–1	Fant–Ewing Coliseum (1,001); Monroe, Louisiana
12/14/2013*; 7:00 pm, CST	at LSU	L 54–61	3–2	Pete Maravich Assembly Center (7,623); Baton Rouge, Louisiana
12/18/2013*; 6:00 pm, CSS	at Ole Miss	L 62–75	3–3	Tad Smith Coliseum (5,754); Oxford, Mississippi
12/22/2013*; 7:00 pm	Louisiana Tech	L 61–83	3–4	Fant–Ewing Coliseum (4,107); Monroe, Louisiana
12/27/2013*; 6:00 pm, BTN	at No. 3 Ohio State	L 31–71	3–5	Value City Arena (18,534); Columbus, Ohio
Sun Belt Conference games
01/04/2014; 4:00 pm	Louisiana–Lafayette	W 103–98 ^{2OT}	4–5 (1–0)	Fant–Ewing Coliseum (1,482); Monroe, Louisiana
01/09/2014; 12:00 pm	at Texas–Arlington	L 79–83 ^{OT}	4–6 (1–1)	College Park Center (1,059); Arlington, Texas
01/11/2014; 4:00 pm	Texas State	L 36–61	4–7 (1–2)	Fant–Ewing Coliseum (1,106); Monroe, Louisiana
01/16/2014; 7:30 pm	at Troy	W 75–64	5–7 (2–2)	Trojan Arena (2,038); Troy, Alabama
01/18/2014; 4:05 pm, Sun Belt Network	at South Alabama	W 64–58	6–7 (3–2)	Mitchell Center (2,358); Mobile, Alabama
01/23/2014; 7:00 pm, ESPN3	WKU	L 51–69	6–8 (3–3)	Fant–Ewing Coliseum (1,528); Monroe, Louisiana
01/25/2014; 4:00 pm	Georgia State	L 58–66	6–9 (3–4)	Fant–Ewing Coliseum (1,682); Monroe, Louisiana
01/30/2014; 7:00 pm	Arkansas State	W 72–65	7–9 (4–4)	Fant–Ewing Coliseum (1,186); Monroe, Louisiana
02/01/2014; 7:15 pm	at Louisiana–Lafayette	L 50–66	7–10 (4–5)	Cajundome (4,685); Lafayette, Louisiana
02/06/2014; 7:00 pm	at Texas State	L 57–65	7–11 (4–6)	Strahan Coliseum (N/A); San Marcos, Texas
02/13/2014; 7:00 pm	Texas–Arlington	L 74–85	7–12 (4–7)	Fant–Ewing Coliseum (1,161); Monroe, Louisiana
02/15/2014; 2:00 pm	Arkansas–Little Rock	W 65–49	8–12 (5–7)	Fant–Ewing Coliseum (1,058); Monroe, Louisiana
02/20/2014; 6:00 pm	at Georgia State	L 60–75	8–13 (5–8)	GSU Sports Arena (1,809); Atlanta, Georgia
02/22/2014; 7:00 pm, ESPN3	at WKU	L 63–72	8–14 (5–9)	E.A. Diddle Arena (5,272); Bowling Green, Kentucky
02/27/2014; 7:00 pm	South Alabama	W 71–54	9–14 (6–9)	Fant–Ewing Coliseum (963); Monroe, Louisiana
03/01/2014; 4:00 pm	Troy	L 46–61	9–15 (6–10)	Fant–Ewing Coliseum (1,376); Monroe, Louisiana
03/06/2014; 7:05 pm	at Arkansas State	L 58–64	9–16 (6–11)	Convocation Center (2,329); Jonesboro, Arkansas
03/08/2014; 7:00 pm	at Arkansas–Little Rock	W 66–65	10–16 (7–11)	Jack Stephens Center (4,437); Little Rock, Arkansas
Sun Belt tournament
03/13/2014; 8:30 pm, Sun Belt Network	vs. Texas–Arlington; First round	L 65–68	10–17	Lakefront Arena (N/A); New Orleans, Louisiana
*Non-conference game. ^{#}Rankings from AP Poll. (#) Tournament seedings in parentheses. All times are in Central Time.
