= 2013–14 Georgia State Panthers men's basketball team =

American college basketball season

2013–14 Georgia State Panthers men's basketball
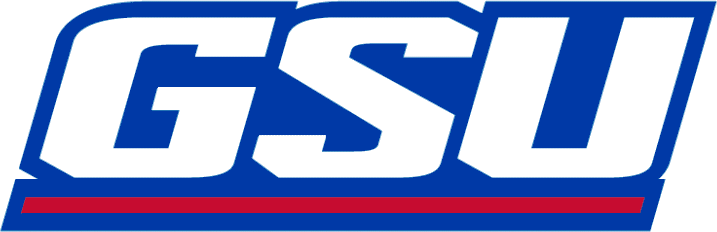

Sun Belt regular season champions

NIT, First round
- Conference: Sun Belt Conference
- Record: 25–9 (17–1 Sun Belt)
- Head coach: Ron Hunter (3rd season)
- Assistant coaches: Darryl LaBarrie (3rd season); Everick Sullivan (3rd season); Claude Pardue (3rd season)
- Home arena: GSU Sports Arena

2013–14 Sun Belt Conference men's basketball standings
	Conf.				Overall
Team	W		L	PCT	W		L	PCT
Georgia State	17	–	1	.944	25	–	9	.735
WKU	12	–	6	.667	21	–	11	.656
Louisiana–Lafayette †	11	–	7	.611	23	–	12	.657
Arkansas State	10	–	8	.556	19	–	13	.594
Arkansas–Little Rock	9	–	9	.500	15	–	17	.469
Texas–Arlington	9	–	9	.500	15	–	17	.469
Louisiana–Monroe	7	–	11	.389	10	–	17	.370
Troy	6	–	12	.333	11	–	20	.355
South Alabama	5	–	13	.278	11	–	20	.355
Texas State	4	–	14	.222	8	–	23	.258
† 2014 Sun Belt Conference tournament winner

The 2013–14 Georgia State Panthers men's basketball team represented Georgia State University during the 2013–14 NCAA Division I men's basketball season. The team's head coach was Ron Hunter serving his third season at GSU. The Panthers played their home games at the GSU Sports Arena competing as members of the Sun Belt Conference. They finished the season 25–9, 17–1 in Sun Belt play to win the Sun Belt regular season championship, advancing to the championship game of the Sun Belt Conference tournament where they lost to Louisiana–Lafayette. As a regular season conference champion who failed to win their conference tournament, they received an automatic bid to the National Invitation Tournament where they lost in the first round to Clemson.

== Season notes ==
- This is the Panthers first year in the Sun Belt Conference since leaving in 1981.
- Despite playing at Kentucky during the 2012–2013 season, guard, Ryan Harrow, was granted an NCAA waiver to play immediately at Georgia State due to hardship resulting from his father, who resides in Atlanta, having a stroke prior to the 2012–2013 season.
- Curtis Washington tied the school record for blocked shots in a single game, tying 3 ways at 9 with Sylvester Morgan and James Vincent during the season opener on November 9 against Southern Poly.
- R. J. Hunter broke his own record for 3-pointers made in a single game at 12 on December 22 against UTSA. His previous record was 10 the previous season vs. Old Dominion.
- R. J. Hunter also broke the record for 3-pointers attempted in a single game at 19 on December 22 against UTSA.
- The team broke the record for free throws made in a single game, making a perfect 22 of 22 on the January 9th game against Western Kentucky. This was also a record for the E. A. Diddle Arena, Western Kentucky's home arena.
- R. J. Hunter took the record for consecutive free throws made, ending with his 38th straight during the January 14th game against Louisiana.
- The 10-0 conference start ending against UALR was the first time that the Panthers have gone undefeated in conference for 10 games.
- Georgia State made a new win streak record, making 14 straight starting against ODU on December 14, 2013, and ending on February 6 against UALR.
- Due to inclement weather conditions throughout the state of Georgia, the home game against South Alabama was moved from Thursday, January 30 to Monday, February 3.
- Due to inclement weather conditions, the home game against Texas State was moved from Thursday, February 13 to Monday, February 17.
- During the February 15th game against Troy, R. J. Hunter made his 1,000th career point, the third-fastest to reach the mark in school history.
- During the February 17th game against Texas State, Ryan Harrow made his 1,000th career point, the second-fastest to reach the mark in school history (edging R. J. out by one game).
- During the February 20th game against ULM, Manny Atkins made his 1,000th career point.

== Roster ==
2013–14 Georgia State Panthers men's basketball team
Players
Coaches

Pos.	#	Name	Height	Weight	Year	Hometown
F	1	LaRon Smith	6 ft 8 in (2.03 m)	196 lb (89 kg)	So	Palm Bay, FL
G	2	Ryann Green (W)	6 ft 1 in (1.85 m)	180 lb (82 kg)	Jr	College Park, GA
G	4	Isaiah Dennis	5 ft 11 in (1.8 m)	180 lb (82 kg)	Fr	McDonough, GA
G	10	Kevin Shaw	6 ft 1 in (1.85 m)	180 lb (82 kg)	Jr	Louisville, KY
G	11	Jaylen Hinton	6 ft 0 in (1.83 m)	170 lb (77 kg)	Fr	Richmond, Va
G	12	Devonte White	5 ft 11 in (1.8 m)	170 lb (77 kg)	Sr	Alpharetta, GA
G	22	R. J. Hunter	6 ft 5 in (1.96 m)	185 lb (84 kg)	So	Indianapolis, IN
F	23	Manny Atkins	6 ft 6 in (1.98 m)	205 lb (93 kg)	RS Sr	Tucker, GA
G	24	Darius Sharpe (W)	6 ft 1 in (1.85 m)	185 lb (84 kg)	Fr	Atlanta, GA
G	25	Rashaard Richardson	6 ft 4 in (1.93 m)	185 lb (84 kg)	Sr	Charleston, SC
F	31	TJ Shipes	6 ft 7 in (2.01 m)	230 lb (104 kg)	So	Buford, GA
F	33	Marcus Crider	6 ft 6 in (1.98 m)	205 lb (93 kg)	So	Dayton, OH
F	42	Curtis Washington	6 ft 9 in (2.06 m)	240 lb (109 kg)	RS Jr	Elizabethtown, KY
F	45	Denny Burguillos	6 ft 7 in (2.01 m)	230 lb (104 kg)	Sr	Valencia, Venezuela
G	55	Ryan Harrow	6 ft 2 in (1.88 m)	170 lb (77 kg)	RS Jr	Marietta, GA

Head coach

- Ron Hunter (Miami (Ohio))

Assistant coach(es)

- Darryl LaBarrie (Georgia Tech)
- Everick Sullivan (Louisville)
- Claude Pardue (Emory)

Legend

- (C) Team captain
- (S) Suspended
- (I) Ineligible
- (W) Walk-on
- Injured
- Current redshirt

== Schedule ==
Date time, TV	Rank^{#}	Opponent^{#}	Result	Record	Site city, state
Exhibition
October 29*; 7:00 pm		Shorter	W 90–60		GSU Sports Arena; Atlanta, GA
November 4*; 7:00 pm		Fort Valley State	W 94–38		GSU Sports Arena; Atlanta, GA
Regular season
November 9*; 1:00 pm		Southern Poly	W 97–78	1–0	GSU Sports Arena (1,591); Atlanta, GA
November 12*; 8:00 pm		at Vanderbilt	L 80–86	1–1	Memorial Gymnasium (8,241); Nashville, TN
November 18*; 5:30 pm		vs. McNeese State; NIT Season Tip-Off	W 96–70	2–1	Coleman Coliseum (9,903); Tuscaloosa, Alabama
November 19*; 8:00 pm, ESPN3		at Alabama; NIT Season Tip-Off	L 58–75	2–2	Coleman Coliseum (9,527); Tuscaloosa, Alabama
November 25*; 5:00 pm		vs. Canisius; NIT Season Tip-Off	L 71–79	2–3	Alumni Gym (844); Elon, NC
November 26*; 7:30 pm		at Elon; NIT Season Tip-Off	L 85–90	2–4	Alumni Gym (577); Elon, NC
November 30*; 5:00 pm		at FIU	L 60–61	2–5	U.S. Century Bank Arena (1,028); Miami, FL
December 4*; 7:00 pm		Young Harris	W 71–54	3–5	GSU Sports Arena (1,747); Atlanta, GA
December 7*; 4:00 pm		at Southern Miss	L 65–75	3–6	Reed Green Coliseum (3,425); Hattiesburg, MS
December 14*; 2:00 pm		Old Dominion	W 79–73	4–6	GSU Sports Arena (1,477); Atlanta, GA
December 20*; 7:00 pm		Georgia Southern	W 73–61	5–6	GSU Sports Arena (1,893); Atlanta, GA
December 22*; 2:00 pm		at UTSA	W 99–68	6–6	Convocation Center (885); San Antonio, TX
December 29*; 1:00 pm		at East Carolina	W 89–82	7–6	Williams Arena at Minges Coliseum (4,309); Greenville, NC
January 2; 7:00 pm		Troy	W 81–72	8–6 (1–0)	GSU Sports Arena (1,436); Atlanta, GA
January 4; 5:00 pm		at South Alabama	W 73–63	9–6 (2–0)	Mitchell Center (2,244); Mobile, AL
January 9; 8:00 pm, ESPN3		at WKU	W 77–54	10–6 (3–0)	E. A. Diddle Arena (3,971); Bowling Green, KY
January 16; 7:00 pm		Arkansas State	W 73–72	11–6 (4–0)	GSU Sports Arena (2,089); Atlanta, GA
January 18; 2:30 pm		Arkansas–Little Rock	W 99–73	12–6 (5–0)	GSU Sports Arena (1,859); Atlanta, GA
January 23; 8:15 pm		at Louisiana–Lafayette	W 77–70	13–6 (6–0)	Cajundome (3,729); Lafayette, LA
January 25; 5:00 pm		at Louisiana–Monroe	W 66–58	14–6 (7–0)	Fant–Ewing Coliseum (1,682); Monroe, LA
February 1; 8:30 pm, Sun Belt Network		Texas–Arlington	W 101–91 ^{OT}	15–6 (8–0)	GSU Sports Arena (2,281); Atlanta, GA
February 3; 7:00 pm		South Alabama	W 85–65	16–6 (9–0)	GSU Sports Arena (2,068); Atlanta, GA
February 6; 8:00 pm		at Arkansas–Little Rock	W 68–57	17–6 (10–0)	Jack Stephens Center (3,338); Little Rock, AR
February 15; 6:00 pm, ESPN2		at Troy	L 81–85	17–7 (10–1)	Trojan Arena (2,774); Troy, AL
February 17; 7:30 pm		Texas State	W 68–41	18–7 (11–1)	GSU Sports Arena (2,157); Atlanta, GA
February 20; 7:00 pm		Louisiana–Monroe	W 75–60	19–7 (12–1)	GSU Sports Arena (2,130); Atlanta, GA
February 22; 8:30 pm, Sun Belt Network		Louisiana–Lafayette	W 80–77	20–7 (13–1)	GSU Sports Arena (2,890); Atlanta, GA
February 27; 8:30 pm		at Texas–Arlington	W 77–49	21–7 (14–1)	College Park Center (1,584); Arlington, TX
March 1; 5:30 pm		at Texas State	W 66–55	22–7 (15–1)	Strahan Coliseum (2,002); San Marcos, TX
March 4; 8:00 pm		at Arkansas State	W 79–76 ^{OT}	23–7 (16–1)	Convocation Center (1,884); Jonesboro, AR
March 8; 2:30 pm, ESPN3		WKU	W 73–55	24–7 (17–1)	GSU Sports Arena (3,870); Atlanta, GA
Sun Belt tournament
March 15; 3:00 pm, Sun Belt Network	(1)	vs. (4) Arkansas State; Semifinals	W 72–45	25–7	Lakefront Arena (2,591); New Orleans, LA
March 16; 12:00 pm, ESPN2	(1)	vs. (3) Louisiana–Lafayette; Championship	L 81–82 ^{OT}	25–8	Lakefront Arena (2,378); New Orleans, LA
NIT
March 18*; 9:00 pm, ESPNU	(6)	at (3) Clemson; First round	L 66–78	25–9	Littlejohn Coliseum (3,859); Clemson, SC
*Non-conference game. ^{#}Rankings from AP Poll. (#) Tournament seedings in parentheses. All times are in Eastern Time.
