= 2013–14 Louisiana–Lafayette Ragin' Cajuns men's basketball team =

American college basketball season

2013–14 Louisiana–Lafayette Ragin' Cajuns men's basketball

Sun Belt tournament champions

NCAA tournament, round of 64
- Conference: Sun Belt Conference
- Record: 23–12 (11–7 Sun Belt)
- Head coach: Bob Marlin (4th season)
- Assistant coaches: Neil Hardin; Kevin Johnson; Gus Hauser; La'Ryan Gary
- Home arena: Cajundome

2013–14 Sun Belt Conference men's basketball standings
	Conf.				Overall
Team	W		L	PCT	W		L	PCT
Georgia State	17	–	1	.944	25	–	9	.735
WKU	12	–	6	.667	21	–	11	.656
Louisiana–Lafayette †	11	–	7	.611	23	–	12	.657
Arkansas State	10	–	8	.556	19	–	13	.594
Arkansas–Little Rock	9	–	9	.500	15	–	17	.469
Texas–Arlington	9	–	9	.500	15	–	17	.469
Louisiana–Monroe	7	–	11	.389	10	–	17	.370
Troy	6	–	12	.333	11	–	20	.355
South Alabama	5	–	13	.278	11	–	20	.355
Texas State	4	–	14	.222	8	–	23	.258
† 2014 Sun Belt Conference tournament winner

The 2013–14 Louisiana–Lafayette Ragin' Cajuns men's basketball team represented the University of Louisiana at Lafayette during the 2013–14 NCAA Division I men's basketball season. The Ragin' Cajuns, led by fourth year head coach Bob Marlin, played their home games at the Cajundome and were members of the Sun Belt Conference. They finished the season 23–12, 11–7 in Sun Belt play to finish in third place. They were champions of the Sun Belt Conference tournament to earn an automatic bid to the NCAA tournament where they lost in the second round to Creighton.

== Roster ==
2013–14 Louisiana–Lafayette Ragin' Cajuns Men's Basketball Roster
Number	Name	Position	Height	Weight	Year	Hometown
0	Bryant Mbamulu	Guard	6–2	194	Senior	Houston, Texas
1	Luka Kamber	Forward	6–7	208	Freshman	Berlin, Germany
2	Elfrid Payton	Guard	6–3	190	Junior	Gretna, Louisiana
3	Xavian Rimmer	Guard	6–2	225	Junior	Piney Woods, Mississippi
4	Steven Wronkoski	Guard	6–5	190	Sophomore	Hammond, Louisiana
5	Kasey Shepherd	Guard	6–3	178	Sophomore	Houston, Texas
11	Donovan Williams	Guard	6–0	189	Junior	Cecilia, Louisiana
21	Shawn Long	Forward	6–9	245	Sophomore	Morgan City, Louisiana
22	Elridge Moore	Forward	6–5	205	Senior	New Orleans, Louisiana
23	Hayward Register	Guard	6–2	170	Freshman	Lafayette, Louisiana
31	Kevin Brown	Guard	6–1	200	Junior	Houston, Texas
32	Aaron LeBlanc	Forward	6–5	195	Junior	Charenton, Louisiana
33	Vieux Kande	Center	6–8	240	Freshman	Dakar, Senegal
35	Braylon Lazare	Forward	6–5	220	Senior	Baton Rouge, Louisiana
44	J.J. Davenport	Center	6–6	325	Junior	Abbeville, Louisiana

== Schedule ==
Date time, TV	Rank^{#}	Opponent^{#}	Result	Record	High points	High rebounds	High assists	Site (attendance) city, state
Exhibition
11/04/2013*; 7:15 pm		William Carey	W 75–60		––– – –––	––– – –––	––– – –––	Cajundome (N/A); Lafayette, Louisiana
Regular season
11/09/2013*; 2:00 pm		Louisiana College	W 101–67	1–0	23 – Long	14 – Long	10 – Payton	Cajundome (2,787); Lafayette, Louisiana
11/12/2013*; 7:05 pm		McNeese State	W 92–66	2–0	29 – Long	15 – Long	4 – Rimmer	Cajundome (3,071); Lafayette, Louisiana
11/15/2013*; 7:05 pm		at Arkansas; Maui Invitational	L 63–76	2–1	27 – Payton	8 – Moore	3 – Wronkoski	Bud Walton Arena (12,780); Fayetteville, Arkansas
11/17/2013*; 4:00 pm		at No. 23 Baylor; Maui Invitational	L 68–87	2–2	20 – Patyon	9 – Payton	7 – Payton	Ferrell Center (5,290); Waco, Texas
11/23/2013*; 5:30 pm		vs. Oakland; Maui Invitational	W 84–75	3–2	32 – Patyon	17 – Long	6 – Brown	HTC Center (1,550); Conway, South Carolina
11/24/2013*; 11:30 am		vs. Coastal Carolina; Maui Invitational	W 73–69	4–2	21 – Rimmer	8 – Payton	9 – Payton	HTC Center (1,413); Conway, South Carolina
11/27/2013*; 7:05 pm		Northwestern State	W 105–74	5–2	22 – Long	15 – Long	6 – Shephard	Cajundome (3,153); Lafayette, Louisiana
12/04/2013*; 6:30 pm		at Louisiana Tech	W 89–80	6–2	22 – Shephard	12 – Long	3 – Rimmer	Thomas Assembly Center (4,085); Ruston, Louisiana
12/07/2013*; 12:00 pm		at No. 6 Louisville	L 74–113	6–3	25 – Long	5 – Payton	10 – Payton	KFC Yum! Center (20,141); Louisville, Kentucky
12/14/2013*; 7:05 pm		Houston	W 79–76 ^{OT}	7–3	31 – Payton	12 – Long	5 – Payton	Cajundome (3,069); Lafayette, Louisiana
12/17/2013*; 7:05 pm		Centenary	W 103–69	8–3	30 – Long	7 – Long	7 – Payton	Cajundome (3,382); Lafayette, Louisiana
12/19/2013*; 7:30 pm		at Jackson State	L 70–73	8–4	22 – Payton	19 – Long	4 – Payton	Williams Assembly Center (891); Jackson, Mississippi
12/30/2013*; 7:05 pm		Central Methodist	W 90–58	9–4	26 – Long	12 – Long	7 – Payton	Cajundome (2,625); Lafayette, Louisiana
01/04/2014; 4:00 pm		at Louisiana–Monroe	L 98–103 ^{2OT}	9–5 (0–1)	34 – Payton	11 – Payton	11 – Payton	Fant–Ewing Coliseum (1,482); Monroe, Louisiana
01/11/2014; 2:00 pm		Texas–Arlington	L 70–90	10–5 (1–1)	22 – Long	9 – Long	7 – Payton	Cajundome (2,731); Lafayette, Louisiana
01/13/2014; 6:00 pm		Texas State	W 81–58	11–5 (2–1)	21 – Payton	9 – Long	7 – Payton	Cajundome (2,039); Lafayette, Louisiana
01/16/2014; 7:05 pm		at South Alabama	L 73–81	11–6 (2–2)	18 – Payton	10 – Long	6 – Payton	Mitchell Center (2,193); Mobile, Alabama
01/18/2014; 7:30 pm		at Troy	W 72–59	12–6 (3–2)	18 – Long	7 – Long	8 – Payton	Trojan Arena (1,738); Troy, Alabama
01/23/2014; 7:15 pm		Georgia State	L 70–77	12–7 (3–3)	21 – Payton	15 – Long	4 – Payton	Cajundome (3,729); Lafayette, Louisiana
01/25/2014; 4:15 pm		WKU	L 70–79	12–8 (3–4)	16 – Payton	11 – Long	6 – Payton	Cajundome (4,998); Lafayette, Louisiana
01/30/2014; 7:00 pm		at Arkansas–Little Rock	L 69–80	12–9 (3–5)	20 – Payton	11 – Davenport	5 – Payton	Jack Stephens Center (3,412); Little Rock, Arkansas
02/01/2014; 7:15 pm		Louisiana–Monroe	W 66–50	13–9 (4–5)	28 – Payton	12 – Long	2 – Mbamalu	Cajundome (4,685); Lafayette, Louisiana
02/06/2014; 7:30 pm		at Texas–Arlington	W 92–89	14–9 (5–5)	31 – Long	10 – Payton	7 – Payton	College Park Center (1,208); Arlington, Texas
02/08/2014; 4:30 pm		at Texas State	W 67–66	15–9 (6–5)	20 – Long	13 – Long	4 – Payton	Strahan Coliseum (2,963); San Marcos, Texas
02/13/2014; 7:05 pm		Arkansas–Little Rock	W 93–87 ^{2OT}	16–9 (7–5)	23 – Payton	10 – Payton	6 – Payton	Cajundome (3,624); Lafayette, Louisiana
02/15/2014; 7:15 pm		Arkansas State	W 85–67	17–9 (8–5)	22 – Payton	11 – Long	7 – Payton	Cajundome (4,223); Lafayette, Louisiana
02/20/2014; 7:05 pm		Troy	W 78–63	18–9 (9–5)	21 – Mbamalu	9 – Long	7 – Payton	Cajundome (3,466); Lafayette, Louisiana
02/22/2014; 7:30 pm		at Georgia State	L 77–80	18–10 (9–6)	22 – Long	8 – Long	8 – Payton	GSU Sports Arena (2,890); Atlanta, Georgia
03/02/2014; 3:00 pm		South Alabama	W 102–74	19–10 (10–6)	31 – Mbamalu	11 – Mbamalu	7 – Payton	Cajundome (3,487); Lafayette, Louisiana
03/06/2014; 7:00 pm		at WKU	L 72–75	19–11 (10–7)	31 – Payton	13 – Payton	3 – Payton	E. A. Diddle Arena (4,810); Bowling Green, Kentucky
03/08/2014; 7:15 pm		Arkansas State	W 77–76	20–11 (11–7)	25 – Long	11 – Long	6 – Payton	Convocation Center (3,275); Jonesboro, Arkansas
Sun Belt tournament
03/14/2014; 8:30 pm, Sun Belt Network	(3)	vs. (6) Texas–Arlington; Quarterfinals	W 91–85	21–11	24 – Rimmer	17 – Long	6 – Payton	Lakefront Arena (N/A); New Orleans, Louisiana
03/15/2014; 4:30 pm, Sun Belt Network	(3)	vs. (2) Western Kentucky; Semifinals	W 73–72	22–11	23 – Mbamalu	7 – Payton	9 – Payton	Lakefront Arena (N/A); New Orleans, Louisiana
03/16/2014; 12:00 pm, ESPN2	(3)	vs. (1) Georgia State; Championship	W 82–81 ^{OT}	23–11	27 – Rimmer	14 – Long	6 – Payton	Lakefront Arena (2,378); New Orleans, Louisiana
NCAA tournament
03/21/2014*; 2:10 pm, truTV	(14 W)	vs. (3 W) No. 16 Creighton; Second round	L 66–76	23–12	24 – Payton	8 – Payton	3 – Payton	AT&T Center (12,663); San Antonio, Texas
*Non-conference game. ^{#}Rankings from AP Poll, (#) denotes seed within region W=West. (#) Tournament seedings in parentheses. All times are in Central Time.
