= Ryan White (disambiguation) =

Ryan White (1971–1990) was an American teenager who became a national poster child for HIV/AIDS in the United States.

Ryan White may refer to:

== Film ==
- The Ryan White Story, 1989 American made-for-television biographical drama film

== Government and legislation ==
- Ryan White CARE Act, 1990 U.S. Act to improve care for individuals and families affected by HIV
- Ryan White HIV/AIDS Program, Agency of the US Department of Health and Human Services

== People ==
- Ryan White (basketball) (born 1988), American basketball player
- Ryan White (filmmaker), American documentary producer and director
- Ryan White (ice hockey) (born 1988), Canadian ice hockey center
- Ryan White (soccer) (born 2005), Australian soccer player

== See also ==
- Rhyan White (born 2000), American swimmer
