= 2013–14 South Alabama Jaguars men's basketball team =

American college basketball season

2013–14 South Alabama Jaguars men's basketball
- Conference: Sun Belt Conference
- Record: 11–20 (5–13 Sun Belt)
- Head coach: Matthew Graves (1st season)
- Assistant coaches: Darnell Archey; Dan Matic; Russ Willemsen
- Home arena: Mitchell Center

2013–14 Sun Belt Conference men's basketball standings
	Conf.				Overall
Team	W		L	PCT	W		L	PCT
Georgia State	17	–	1	.944	25	–	9	.735
WKU	12	–	6	.667	21	–	11	.656
Louisiana–Lafayette †	11	–	7	.611	23	–	12	.657
Arkansas State	10	–	8	.556	19	–	13	.594
Arkansas–Little Rock	9	–	9	.500	15	–	17	.469
Texas–Arlington	9	–	9	.500	15	–	17	.469
Louisiana–Monroe	7	–	11	.389	10	–	17	.370
Troy	6	–	12	.333	11	–	20	.355
South Alabama	5	–	13	.278	11	–	20	.355
Texas State	4	–	14	.222	8	–	23	.258
† 2014 Sun Belt Conference tournament winner

The 2013–14 South Alabama Jaguars basketball team represented the University of South Alabama during the 2013–14 NCAA Division I men's basketball season. The Jaguars, led by first year head coach Matthew Graves, played their home games at the Mitchell Center and were members of the Sun Belt Conference.

They finished the season 11–20, 5–13 in Sun Belt play to finish in ninth place. They failed to qualify for the Sun Belt Conference tournament.

== Roster ==
Number	Name	Position	Height	Weight	Year	Hometown
1	Ken Williams	Guard	6–2	175	Freshman	Manvel, Texas
3	Isaiah Maston	Guard	6–3	185	Freshman	Birmingham, Alabama
4	Barrington Stevens III	Guard	5–10	190	Sophomore	Allen, Texas
10	Georgi Boyanov	Forward	6–8	200	Freshman	Lovech, Bulgaria
11	E.J Conley	Guard	5–9	150	Sophomore	Enterprise, Alabama
12	Antoine Allen	Guard	6–1	175	Senior	Baltimore, Maryland
13	Mychal Ammons	Guard	6–6	225	Junior	Vicksburg, Mississippi
20	Aakim Saintil	Guard	6–0	165	Freshman	Roselle, New Jersey
21	Augustine Rubit	Forward	6–7	220	Senior	Houston, Texas
24	Dionte Ferguson	Forward	6–6	220	Junior	Prattville, Alabama
25	T.J. Johnson	Guard	6–2	175	Freshman	Tamarac, Florida
31	Viktor Juricek	Forward	6–11	210	Sophomore	Prievidza, Slovakia
32	Austin Karazsia	Forward	6–8	220	Freshman	Linton, Indiana

== Schedule ==
Date time, TV	Opponent	Result	Record	Site (attendance) city, state
Exhibition
11/05/2013*; 7:00 pm	Mobile	W 65–55		Mitchell Center (2,115); Mobile, AL
Regular season
11/08/2013*; 7:00 pm	Detroit	W 74–58	1–0	Mitchell Center (2,152); Mobile, AL
11/14/2013*; 7:00 pm, LHN	at Texas; CBE Classic	L 77–84	1–1	Frank Erwin Center (7,193); Austin, TX
11/18/2013*; 7:00 pm	William Carey	W 76–53	2–1	Mitchell Center (1,786); Mobile, AL
11/22/2013*; 7:00 pm	Southern Miss; CBE Classic	L 59–66	2–2	Mitchell Center (3,061); Mobile, AL
11/23/2013*; 1:00 pm	Wright State; CBE Classic	W 74–70	3–2	Mitchell Center (1,614); Mobile, AL
11/24/2013*; 2:00 pm	Houston Baptist; CBE Classic	W 79–59	4–2	Mitchell Center (1,572); Mobile, AL
11/30/2013*; 12:00 pm, CSS	at Middle Tennessee	L 55–65	4–3	Murphy Center (3,892); Murfreesboro, TN
12/02/2013*; 7:00 pm	Spring Hill	W 91–41	5–3	Mitchell Center (1,905); Mobile, AL
12/07/2013*; 2:00 pm	at Rice	L 93–96 ^{3OT}	5–4	Tudor Fieldhouse (1,201); Houston, TX
12/14/2013*; 9:00 pm, Root Sports	vs. No. 20 Gonzaga; Battle in Seattle	L 59–68	5–5	KeyArena (9,140); Seattle, WA
12/17/2013*; 7:00 pm	Dillard	W 82–73	6–5	Mitchell Center (1,736); Mobile, AL
12/21/2013*; 7:00 pm	vs. Arkansas	L 60–72	6–6	Verizon Arena (10,627); North Little Rock, AR
12/28/2013*; 8:00 pm	at New Mexico State	L 64–82	6–7	Pan American Center (4,694); Las Cruces, NM
01/02/2014; 5:00 pm, ESPN3	WKU	L 56–58	6–8 (0–1)	Mitchell Center (1,556); Mobile, AL
01/04/2014; 4:00 pm	Georgia State	L 63–73	6–9 (0–2)	Mitchell Center (2,244); Mobile, AL
11/09/2014*; 7:00 pm	Arkansas–Little Rock	L 60–65	6–10 (0–3)	Jack Stephens Center (2,785); Little Rock, AR
01/11/2014; 7:00 pm, Sun Belt Network	Arkansas State	L 60–72	6–11 (0–4)	Convocation Center (4,344); Jonesboro, AR
01/16/2014; 7:00 pm	Louisiana–Lafayette	W 81–73	7–11 (1–4)	Mitchell Center (2,193); Mobile, AL
01/18/2014; 7:30 pm, Sun Belt Network	Louisiana–Monroe	L 58–64	7–12 (1–5)	Mitchell Center (2,385); Mobile, AL
01/25/2014; 7:30 pm	at Texas–Arlington	L 65–73	7–13 (1–6)	College Park Center (2,896); Arlington, TX
02/01/2014; 4:00 pm	Arkansas–Little Rock	L 58–62	7–14 (1–7)	Mitchell Center (3,542); Mobile, AL
02/03/2014; 7:00 pm	at Georgia State; Postponed from 1/30	L 65–85	7–15 (1–8)	GSU Sports Arena (2,068); Atlanta, GA
02/06/2014; 7:30 pm	at Troy	L 74–79	7–16 (1–9)	Trojan Arena (2,051); Troy, AL
02/13/2014; 7:00 pm	Arkansas State	L 61–85	7–17 (1–10)	Mitchell Center (1,872); Mobile, AL
02/15/2014; 7:00 pm, ESPN3	at WKU	W 69–62	8–17 (2–10)	E. A. Diddle Arena (4,824); Bowling Green, KY
02/20/2014; 7:00 pm	at Texas State	L 66–67 ^{OT}	8–18 (2–11)	Strahan Coliseum (1,709); San Marcos, TX
02/22/2014; 7:00 pm	Troy	W 86–78	9–18 (3–11)	Mitchell Center (3,414); Mobile, AL
02/27/2014; 7:00 pm	at Louisiana–Monroe	L 54–71	9–19 (3–12)	Fant–Ewing Coliseum (963); Monroe, LA
03/02/2014; 3:00 pm, Sun Belt Network	at Louisiana–Lafayette	L 74–102	9–20 (3–13)	Cajundome (3,487); Lafayette, LA
03/06/2014; 7:00 pm	Texas State	W 63–53	10–20 (4–13)	Mitchell Center (1,546); Mobile, AL
03/08/2014; 7:00 pm	Texas–Arlington	W 78–73	11–20 (5–13)	Mitchell Center (2,425); Mobile, AL
*Non-conference game. ^{#}Rankings from AP Poll. (#) Tournament seedings in parentheses. All times are in Central Time.
