= 2013–14 Texas–Arlington Mavericks men's basketball team =

American college basketball season

2013–14 Texas–Arlington Mavericks men's basketball
- Conference: Sun Belt Conference
- Record: 15–17 (9–9 Sun Belt)
- Head coach: Scott Cross (8th season)
- Assistant coaches: Greg Young; Zak Buncik; Andrae Patterson
- Home arena: College Park Center

2013–14 Sun Belt Conference men's basketball standings
	Conf.				Overall
Team	W		L	PCT	W		L	PCT
Georgia State	17	–	1	.944	25	–	9	.735
WKU	12	–	6	.667	21	–	11	.656
Louisiana–Lafayette †	11	–	7	.611	23	–	12	.657
Arkansas State	10	–	8	.556	19	–	13	.594
Arkansas–Little Rock	9	–	9	.500	15	–	17	.469
Texas–Arlington	9	–	9	.500	15	–	17	.469
Louisiana–Monroe	7	–	11	.389	10	–	17	.370
Troy	6	–	12	.333	11	–	20	.355
South Alabama	5	–	13	.278	11	–	20	.355
Texas State	4	–	14	.222	8	–	23	.258
† 2014 Sun Belt Conference tournament winner

The 2013–14 Texas–Arlington Mavericks men's basketball team represented the University of Texas at Arlington during the 2013–14 NCAA Division I men's basketball season. The Mavericks, led by eighth year head coach Scott Cross, played their home games at the College Park Center and were first year members of the Sun Belt Conference. They finished the season 15–17, 9–9 in Sun Belt play to finish in a tie for fifth place. They advanced to the quarterfinals of the Sun Belt Conference tournament where they lost to Louisiana–Lafayette.

== Roster ==
Number	Name	Position	Height	Weight	Year	Hometown
1	Reger Dowell	Guard	6–1	183	Senior	Duncanville, Texas
2	Luke Davis	Guard	6–1	154	Sophomore	Lubbock, Texas
3	Jamel Outler	Guard	6–2	183	Junior	Houston, Texas
4	Drew Charles	Guard	6–2	193	Sophomore	Azle, Texas
5	Stuart Lagerson	Center	7–0	220	Junior	Converse, Texas
10	Johnny Hill	Guard	6–3	180	Junior	Glendale Heights, Illinois
11	Brandon Williams	Forward	6–10	200	Freshman	Houston, Texas
12	Shaquille White-Miller	Guard	5–9	176	Junior	Port Arthur, Texas
13	Vincent Dillard	Forward	6–5	200	Senior	Sanford, Florida
15	Kyle McElvain	Guard	6–2	191	Senior	Arlington, Texas
21	Greg Gainey	Forward	6–5	212	Senior	Dayton, Ohio
22	Lonnie McClanahan	Guard	6–1	175	Junior	Oak Ridge, Tennessee
25	Courtney Austin	Guard	6–0	185	Junior	Dallas, Texas
35	Brandon Edwards	Forward	6–6	224	Senior	Fort Worth, Texas
44	Anthony Walker	Forward	6–9	210	Junior	San Antonio, Texas
45	Jorge Bilbao	Forward	6–8	190	Freshman	Bilbao, Spain

== Schedule ==
Date time, TV	Opponent	Result	Record	Site (attendance) city, state
Regular season
11/08/2013*; 9:00 pm	at Boise State	L 87–116	0–1	Taco Bell Arena (5,662); Boise, ID
11/12/2013*; 7:30 pm	Samford	W 88–75	1–1	College Park Center (1,239); Arlington, TX
11/13/2013*; 7:30 pm	Howard Payne	W 111–64	2–1	College Park Center (1,072); Arlington, TX
11/15/2013*; 7:30 pm	Cleveland State; Keightley Classic	L 73–83	2–2	College Park Center (4,824); Arlington, TX
11/19/2013*; 6:30 pm, CSS	at No. 4 Kentucky; Keightley Classic	L 76–105	2–3	Rupp Arena (20,305); Lexington, KY
11/21/2013*; 6:00 pm	at Robert Morris; Keightley Classic	L 81–88	2–4	Charles L. Sewall Center (1,166); Moon Township, PA
11/23/2013*; 6:00 pm	at Eastern Michigan; Keightley Classic	L 69–74	2–5	Convocation Center (810); Ypsilanti, MI
11/29/2013*; 7:00 pm, LHN	at Texas	L 69–72	2–6	Frank Erwin Center (7,749); Austin, TX
12/03/2013*; 7:30 pm	Dallas Baptist	W 81–53	3–6	College Park Center (1,161); Arlington, TX
12/07/2013*; 7:30 pm	Weber State			College Park Center; Arlington, TX
12/14/2013*; 7:30 pm	at Houston Baptist	W 80–70	4–6	Sharp Gymnasium (614); Houston, TX
12/17/2013*; 7:00 pm	at Oklahoma	L 89–91	4–7	Lloyd Noble Center (9,401); Norman, OK
12/21/2013*; 1:00 pm	Cal State Bakersfield	W 79–75 ^{OT}	5–7	College Park Center (1,137); Arlington, TX
01/02/2014; 7:30 pm	Arkansas State	L 66–82	5–8 (0–1)	College Park Center (1,412); Arlington, TX
01/05/2014; 5:00 pm	Arkansas–Little Rock	L 70–72	5–9 (0–2)	College Park Center (1,875); Arlington, TX
01/09/2014; 12:00 pm	Louisiana–Monroe	W 83–79 ^{OT}	6–9 (1–2)	College Park Center (1,059); Arlington, TX
01/11/2014; 2:00 pm	at Louisiana–Lafayette	L 70–90	6–10 (1–3)	Cajundome (2,731); Lafayette, LA
01/18/2014; 4:30 pm	at Texas State	W 56–48	7–10 (2–3)	Strahan Coliseum (1,871); San Marcos, TX
01/23/2014; 8:00 pm, Sun Belt Network	Troy	W 59–56	8–10 (3–3)	College Park Center (2,247); Arlington, TX
01/25/2014; 7:30 pm	South Alabama	W 73–65	9–10 (4–3)	College Park Center (2,896); Arlington, TX
01/30/2014; 7:00 pm, ESPN3	at WKU	L 72–77	9–11 (4–4)	E. A. Diddle Arena (4,557); Bowling Green, KY
02/01/2014; 7:30 pm, Sun Belt Network	at Georgia State	L 91–101 ^{OT}	9–12 (4–5)	GSU Sports Arena (2,281); Atlanta, GA
02/06/2014; 7:30 pm	Louisiana–Lafayette	L 89–92	9–13 (4–6)	College Park Center (1,208); Arlington, TX
02/13/2014; 7:00 pm	at Louisiana–Monroe	W 85–74	10–13 (5–6)	Fant–Ewing Coliseum (1,161); Monroe, LA
02/15/2014; 7:30 pm	Texas State	W 69–62	11–13 (6–6)	College Park Center (2,663); Arlington, TX
02/20/2014; 7:00 pm	at Arkansas State	L 60–83	11–14 (6–7)	Convocation Center (2,115); Jonesboro, AR
02/22/2014; 7:00 pm	at Arkansas–Little Rock	W 75–71	12–14 (7–7)	Jack Stephens Center (3,861); Little Rock, AR
02/27/2014; 7:30 pm	Georgia State	L 49–77	12–15 (7–8)	College Park Center (1,584); Arlington, TX
03/01/2014; 7:30 pm	WKU	W 80–73	13–15 (8–8)	College Park Center (1,835); Arlington, TX
03/06/2014; 7:00 pm	at Troy	W 87–86	14–15 (9–8)	Trojan Arena (1,157); Troy, AL
03/08/2014; 7:00 pm	at South Alabama	L 73–78	14–16 (9–9)	Mitchell Center (2,425); Mobile, AL
Sun Belt tournament
03/13/2014; 8:30 pm, Sun Belt Network	vs. Louisiana–Monroe; First round	W 68–65	15–16	Lakefront Arena (N/A); New Orleans, LA
03/14/2014; 8:30 pm, Sun Belt Network	vs. Louisiana–Lafayette; Quarterfinals	L 85–91	15–17	Lakefront Arena (N/A); New Orleans, LA
*Non-conference game. ^{#}Rankings from AP Poll. (#) Tournament seedings in parentheses. All times are in Central Time.
