= 2013–14 Texas State Bobcats men's basketball team =

American college basketball season

2013–14 Texas State Bobcats men's basketball
- Conference: Sun Belt Conference
- Record: 8–23 (4–14 Sun Belt)
- Head coach: Danny Kaspar (1st season)
- Assistant coaches: Rob Flaska; Terrence Rencher; Talvin Hester
- Home arena: Strahan Coliseum

2013–14 Sun Belt Conference men's basketball standings
	Conf.				Overall
Team	W		L	PCT	W		L	PCT
Georgia State	17	–	1	.944	25	–	9	.735
WKU	12	–	6	.667	21	–	11	.656
Louisiana–Lafayette †	11	–	7	.611	23	–	12	.657
Arkansas State	10	–	8	.556	19	–	13	.594
Arkansas–Little Rock	9	–	9	.500	15	–	17	.469
Texas–Arlington	9	–	9	.500	15	–	17	.469
Louisiana–Monroe	7	–	11	.389	10	–	17	.370
Troy	6	–	12	.333	11	–	20	.355
South Alabama	5	–	13	.278	11	–	20	.355
Texas State	4	–	14	.222	8	–	23	.258
† 2014 Sun Belt Conference tournament winner

The 2013–14 Texas State Bobcats men's basketball team represented Texas State University during the 2013–14 NCAA Division I men's basketball season. The Bobcats, led by first year head coach Danny Kaspar, played their home games at Strahan Coliseum and were first year members of the Sun Belt Conference. They finished the season 8–23, 4–14 in Sun Belt play to finish in last place. They failed to qualify for the Sun Belt tournament.

== Roster ==
Number	Name	Position	Height	Weight	Year	Hometown
1	Kavin Gilder-Tilbury	Forward	6–7	210	Freshman	Houston, Texas
2	Jeremiah Moore	Guard	6–4	188	Junior	Plano, Texas
3	Reid Koenen	Forward	6–7	200	Senior	Racine, Wisconsin
4	Ray Dorsey	Guard	6–3	170	Sophomore	Lewisville, Texas
5	Corey Stern	Forward	6–7	220	Senior	Seattle
10	Wesley Davis	Guard	6–3	185	Junior	Arlington, Texas
14	Amari Bryant	Guard	6–2	175	Freshman	Pembroke Pines, Florida
15	Tre Daniels	Guard	5-9	170	Freshmen	Round Rock, Texas
21	Emani Gant	Forward	6–8	225	Sophomore	Los Angeles
22	Victor Bermedez	Guard	6–4	170	Junior	North Las Vegas, Nevada
23	Naiel Smith	Guard	6–5	192	Freshman	Brooklyn, New York
25	Joel Wright	Forward	6–7	225	Senior	Brooklyn, New York
31	Gordon Ball	Forward	6–8	240	Senior	Houston, Texas
32	Kendell Ramlal	Forward	6–7	217	Freshman	Houston, Texas

== Schedule ==
Date time, TV	Opponent	Result	Record	Site (attendance) city, state
Exhibition
11/04/2013*; 7:00 pm	Sul Ross State	W 81–53		Strahan Coliseum (2,061); San Marcos, Texas
Regular season
11/09/2013*; 8:00 pm, ESPN3	Houston	L 70–76	0–1	Hofheinz Pavilion (3,123); Houston, Texas
11/12/2013*; 7:00 pm	Stephen F. Austin	L 57–64	0–2	Strahan Coliseum (2,372); San Marcos, Texas
11/16/2013*; 3:00 pm	at Oral Roberts	L 65–82	0–3	Mabee Center (3,905); Tulsa, Oklahoma
11/20/2013*; 7:00 pm, ESPN3	at SMU	L 49–70	0–4	Curtis Culwell Center (3,509); Garland, Texas
11/25/2013*; 7:00 pm	South Dakota	L 56–57	0–5	Strahan Coliseum (2,114); San Marcos, Texas
11/29/2013*; 4:00 pm	vs. Tulane; Cure UCD Classic by Plan BC3	W 70–52	1–5	Puerto Vallarta International Convention Center (100); Puerto Vallarta, MX
11/30/2013*; 4:00 pm	vs. Northern Kentucky; Cure UCD Classic by Plan BC3	W 70–61	2–5	Puerto Vallarta International Convention Center (100); Puerto Vallarta, MX
12/01/2013*; 4:00 pm	vs. Southeast Missouri State; Cure UCD Classic by Plan BC3	L 74–82	2–6	Puerto Vallarta International Convention Center (125); Puerto Vallarta, MX
12/04/2013*; 7:00 pm	Cedarville	W 79–58	3–6	Strahan Coliseum (1,807); San Marcos, Texas
12/14/2013*; 7:00 pm, LONG	at Texas	L 53–85	3–7	Frank Erwin Center (9,534); Austin, Texas
12/19/2013*; 8:00 pm, P12N	at Utah	L 50–69	3–8	Jon M. Huntsman Center (7,857); Salt Lake City, Utah
12/21/2013*; 4:30 pm	Texas–Tyler	W 73–54	4–8	Strahan Coliseum (1,077); San Marcos, Texas
12/30/2013*; 7:00 pm	LIU Brooklyn	L 64–73	4–9	Strahan Coliseum (1,585); San Marcos, Texas
01/02/2014; 7:30 pm	Arkansas–Little Rock	L 59–63	4–10 (0–1)	Strahan Coliseum (1,595); San Marcos, Texas
01/04/2014; 4:30 pm	Arkansas State	L 69–74	4–11 (0–2)	Strahan Coliseum (1,606); San Marcos, Texas
01/11/2014; 4:00 pm	at Louisiana–Monroe	W 61–36	5–11 (1–2)	Fant–Ewing Coliseum (1,106); Monroe, Louisiana
01/13/2014; 7:00 pm	at Louisiana–Lafayette	L 58–81	5–12 (1–3)	Cajundome (2,039); Lafayette, Louisiana
01/18/2014; 4:30 pm	Texas–Arlington	L 48–56	5–13 (1–4)	Strahan Coliseum (1,871); San Marcos, Texas
01/23/2014; 7:00 pm	at Arkansas–Little Rock	L 64–69	5–14 (1–5)	Jack Stephens Center (3,038); Little Rock, Arkansas
01/25/2014; 4:30 pm, KNVA	Troy	W 73–65	6–14 (2–5)	Strahan Coliseum (2,059); San Marcos, Texas
02/01/2014; 7:00 pm, ESPN3	at WKU	L 64–68	6–15 (2–6)	E. A. Diddle Arena (5,514); Bowling Green, Kentucky
02/06/2014; 7:00 pm, KBVO	Louisiana–Monroe	W 65–57	7–15 (3–6)	Strahan Coliseum (N/A); San Marcos, Texas
02/08/2014; 4:30 pm, KNVA	Louisiana–Lafayette	L 66–67	7–16 (3–7)	Strahan Coliseum (2,963); San Marcos, Texas
02/15/2014; 7:30 pm	at Texas–Arlington	L 62–69	7–17 (3–8)	College Park Center (2,663); Arlington, Texas
02/17/2014; 7:30 pm	at Georgia State; Postponed from 2/13	L 41–68	7–18 (3–9)	GSU Sports Arena (1,759); Atlanta, Georgia
02/20/2014; 7:00 pm, KBVO	South Alabama	W 67–66 ^{OT}	8–18 (4–9)	Strahan Coliseum (1,709); San Marcos, Texas
02/22/2014; 7:00 pm	at Arkansas State	L 68–73	8–19 (4–10)	Convocation Center (2,651); Jonesboro, Arkansas
02/27/2014; 7:00 pm, KBVO	WKU	L 50–51	8–20 (4–11)	Strahan Coliseum (1,849); San Marcos, Texas
03/01/2014; 4:30 pm, KNVA	Georgia State	L 55–66	8–21 (4–12)	Strahan Coliseum (2,002); San Marcos, Texas
03/06/2014; 7:00 pm	at South Alabama	L 53–63	8–22 (4–13)	Mitchell Center (1,546); Mobile, Alabama
03/08/2014; 7:30 pm	at Troy	L 50–72	8–23 (4–14)	Trojan Arena (1,849); Troy, Alabama
*Non-conference game. ^{#}Rankings from AP Poll. (#) Tournament seedings in parentheses. All times are in Central Time.
