= 2014 Sun Belt Conference men's basketball tournament =

- Sun Belt Tournament Logo
- Classification: Division I
- Season: 2013–14
- Teams: 8
- Site: Lakefront Arena; New Orleans, LA
- Champions: Louisiana–Lafayette (6th title)
- Winning coach: Bob Marlin (1st title)
- MVP: Bryant Mbamalu (Louisiana–Lafayette)
- Television: Sun Belt Network, ESPN

2013–14 Sun Belt Conference men's basketball standings
	Conf.				Overall
Team	W		L	PCT	W		L	PCT
Georgia State	17	–	1	.944	25	–	9	.735
WKU	12	–	6	.667	21	–	11	.656
Louisiana–Lafayette †	11	–	7	.611	23	–	12	.657
Arkansas State	10	–	8	.556	19	–	13	.594
Arkansas–Little Rock	9	–	9	.500	15	–	17	.469
Texas–Arlington	9	–	9	.500	15	–	17	.469
Louisiana–Monroe	7	–	11	.389	10	–	17	.370
Troy	6	–	12	.333	11	–	20	.355
South Alabama	5	–	13	.278	11	–	20	.355
Texas State	4	–	14	.222	8	–	23	.258
† 2014 Sun Belt Conference tournament winner

The 2014 Sun Belt Conference men's basketball tournament was held in New Orleans, LA from March 13 to March 16 at the Lakefront Arena. The tournament winner received an automatic bid into the 2014 NCAA tournament. The semifinal games were televised on the Sun Belt Network, with the championship game on ESPN, on Sunday March 16.

== Seeds ==
The top eight teams in the Sun Belt Conference qualified for the tournament. Teams were seeded based on conference record and then a tie breaker system was used. The top two seeds received a double bye, and the third and fourth seeds received a single bye.

Seed	School	Conference	Overall	Tiebreaker
1	Georgia State‡*	17–1	24–7	
2	Western Kentucky*	12–6	20–11	
3	Louisiana–Lafayette#	11–7	20–11	
4	Arkansas State#	10–8	18–12	
5	Arkansas–Little Rock	9–9	14–16	1–1 vs. ULL
6	Texas–Arlington	9–9	14–16	0–2 vs. ULL
7	Louisiana–Monroe	7–11	10–16	
8	Troy	6–12	11–19	
‡ – Sun Belt Conference regular season champions. * – Received a first-round and second-round bye in the conference tournament. # – Received a first-round bye in the conference tournament. Overall record are as of the end of the regular season.

== Schedule ==
Session	Game	Time*	Matchup^{#}	Television
First round – Thursday, March 13
1	1	6:00 pm	#5 Arkansas–Little Rock vs. #8 Troy	Sun Belt Network
1	2	8:30 pm	#6 Texas–Arlington vs. #7 Louisiana–Monroe	Sun Belt Network
Quarterfinals – Friday, March 14
2	3	6:00 pm	#4 Arkansas State vs. #5 Arkansas–Little Rock	Sun Belt Network
2	4	8:30 pm	#3 Louisiana–Lafayette vs. #6 Texas–Arlington	Sun Belt Network
Semifinals – Saturday, March 15
3	5	2:00 pm	#1 Georgia State vs. #4 Arkansas State	Sun Belt Network
3	6	4:30 pm	#2 WKU vs. #3 Louisiana–Lafayette	Sun Belt Network
Championship – Sunday, March 16
4	7	12:00 pm	#1 Georgia State vs. #3 Louisiana–Lafayette	ESPN2
*Game times in CST. #-Rankings denote tournament seeding.

== Bracket ==
First round Thursday, March 13
5	Little Rock	74
8	Troy	61
6	Texas–Arlington	68
7	Louisiana–Monroe	65

Quarterfinals; Friday, March 14
4	Arkansas State	116^{4OT}
5	Little Rock	114
3	Louisiana–Lafayette	91
6	Texas–Arlington	85

Semifinals; Saturday, March 15
1	Georgia State	72
4	Arkansas State	45
2	Western Kentucky	72
3	Louisiana–Lafayette	73

Championship; Sunday, March 16
1	Georgia State	81
3	Louisiana–Lafayette	82^{OT}

== See also ==
2014 Sun Belt Conference women's basketball tournament
