= Nijal Pearson =

American basketball player (born 1997)

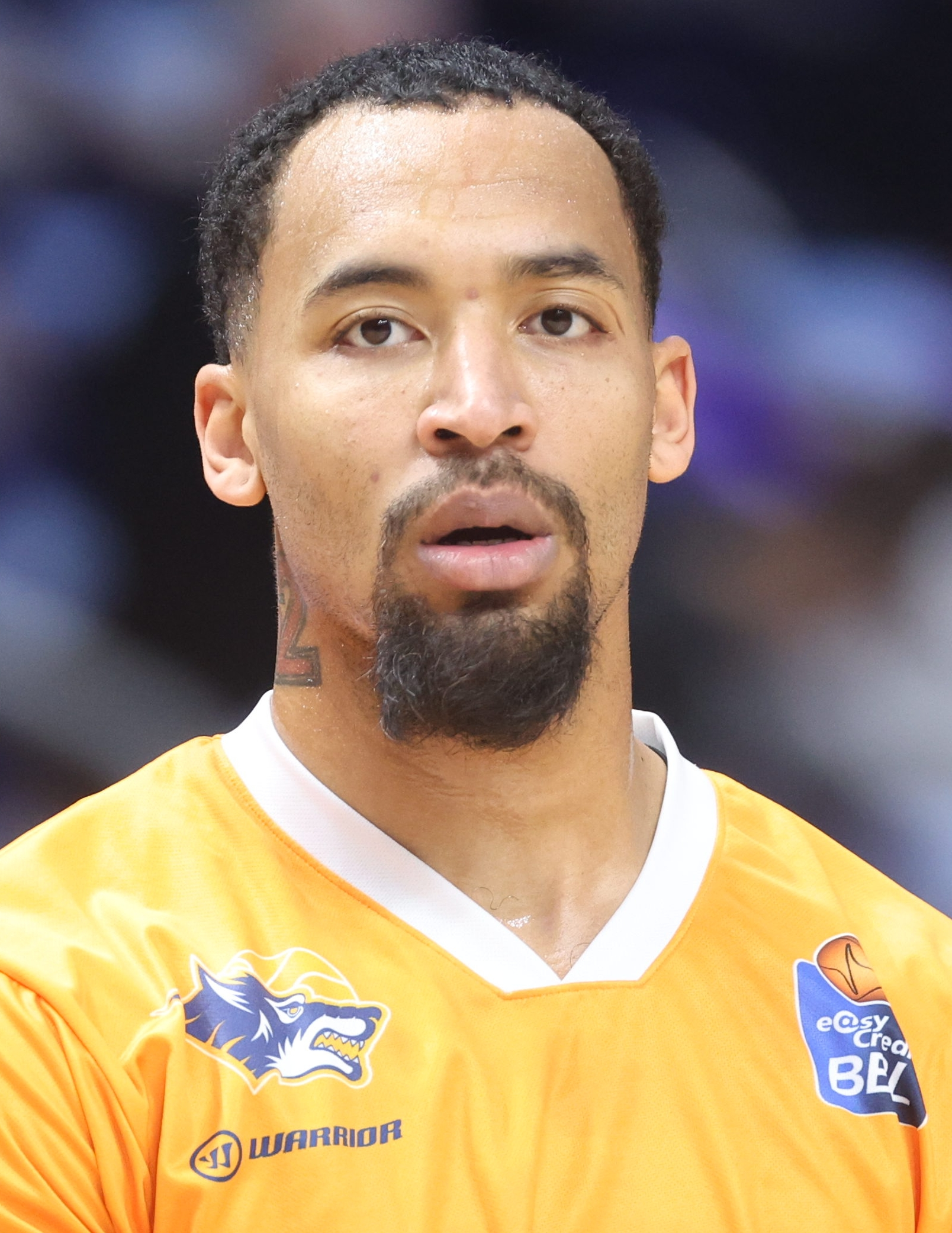
- Pearson with Rostock in 2024

No. 77 – Maccabi Rishon LeZion
- Position: Shooting guard / small forward
- League: Israeli Basketball Premier League

Personal information
- Born: November 21, 1997 (age 28) Beaumont, Texas, U.S.
- Listed height: 6 ft 5 in (1.96 m)
- Listed weight: 200 lb (91 kg)

Career information
- High school: Central (Beaumont, Texas)
- College: Texas State (2016–2020)
- NBA draft: 2020: undrafted
- Playing career: 2020–present

Career history
- 2020–2021: Chorale Roanne Basket
- 2021: Lahti Basketball
- 2021–2023: Rostock Seawolves
- 2023–2024: CSM Oradea
- 2024–2025: Rostock Seawolves
- 2025–2026: Anwil Włocławek
- 2026–present: Maccabi Rishon LeZion

Career highlights
- ProA champion (2022); Sun Belt Player of the Year (2020); 2× First-team All-Sun Belt (2019, 2020); Third-team All-Sun Belt (2018)

Nijal Pearson (born November 21, 1997) is an American basketball player for Maccabi Rishon LeZion of the Israeli Basketball Premier League. He competed in college basketball for the Texas State Bobcats.

== Early life ==
Pearson grew up in Beaumont, Texas and attended Central High School. As a senior, he averaged 18.5 points, seven rebounds and nine assists per game and was named the co-District 22-5A MVP and Class 5A All-State by the Texas Association of Basketball Coaches.

== College career ==
Pearson was a starter at small forward for the Bobcats as a true freshman and averaged 13.3 points (second highest on the team), 3.7 rebounds, and 2.4 assists per game. As a sophomore, he led the team with 15.2 points, 6.0 rebounds and 1.3 steals per game and was named to the third team all-Sun Belt Conference. Pearson was named first team All-Sun Belt as a junior after averaging 16.4 points, 5.1 rebounds and 1.4 steals per game. He was named the MVP of the 2018 Portland Classic after scoring 33 point in the championship game against Portland. He became Texas State's all-time leading scorer on January 18, 2020, in a 23-point performance in a win over ULM, breaking Charles Sharp's 60-year-old record of 1,884 points. Pearson scored his 2,000th career point against Georgia Southern on February 20, 2020. Pearson was named the Sun Belt Conference Men's Basketball Player of the Year as a senior. He averaged 19.4 points, 5.4 rebounds, and 2.5 assists per game.

== Professional career ==
In May 2020, Pearson agreed to terms with Chorale Roanne Basket of the LNB Pro A.

On January 30, 2021, he has signed with Lahti Basketball of the Finnish Korisliiga.

On August 19, 2021, he has signed with Rostock Seawolves of the German ProA.

On July 31, 2023, he has signed with CSM Oradea of the Romanian Liga Națională.

On September 28, 2024, he signed with Rostock Seawolves of the Basketball Bundesliga (BBL) for a second stint.

On July 25, 2025, he signed with Anwil Włocławek of the Polish Basketball League (PLK).

== Career statistics ==
Legend
GP	Games played	GS	Games started	MPG	Minutes per game
FG%	Field goal percentage	3P%	3-point field goal percentage	FT%	Free throw percentage
RPG	Rebounds per game	APG	Assists per game	SPG	Steals per game
BPG	Blocks per game	PPG	Points per game	**Bold**	Career high

=== College ===
Year	Team	GP	GS	MPG	FG%	3P%	FT%	RPG	APG	SPG	BPG	PPG
2016–17	Texas State	**36**	**36**	32.8	**.437**	.346	.721	5.7	2.4	**1.4**	**.4**	13.3
2017–18	Texas State	33	32	32.6	.394	.330	.709	**6.0**	2.4	1.3	**.4**	15.2
2018–19	Texas State	33	33	33.2	.421	**.386**	.690	5.1	1.4	**1.4**	.2	16.4
2019–20	Texas State	31	31	**34.9**	.423	.353	**.772**	5.4	**2.5**	1.3	.3	**19.4**
Career		133	132	33.4	.418	.356	.726	5.6	2.2	1.3	.3	16.0

== Personal life ==
Pearson is the son of Stephanie Lartigue-Pearson and Aubrey Pearson (Aubrey adopted Nijal when he was an infant and carries his last name as a result). Aubrey Pearson coached Nijal as a youth during his participation in AAU Basketball, which served as a launchpad and put Nijal on his path toward success as a Professional Athlete. He has an older brother, Elijah, while his oldest brother Nico died from testicular cancer in 2010. Pearson's girlfriend is Kayla McNutt. She gave birth to the couple's daughter, Nova Lael Pearson, on February 8, 2020. After playing against Appalachian State in Boone, North Carolina, Pearson took an Uber to Charlotte and took the first flight in the morning to see his newborn girl.
