= Ryan White (basketball) =

American basketball player

Personal information
- Born: December 23, 1988 (age 37) Houston, Texas, U.S.
- Listed height: 5 ft 10 in (1.78 m)
- Listed weight: 175 lb (79 kg)

Career information
- High school: Alief Elsik (Houston, Texas)
- College: Texas State (2007–2011)
- NBA draft: 2011: undrafted
- Playing career: 2011–present
- Position: Point guard

Career history
- 2011–2012: Aalborg Vikings
- 2012: RTV21
- 2012–2013: Trepça
- 2013–2014: AS Soleuvre
- 2014–2015: Copenhagen Wolfpack
- 2015–2016: Kožuv
- 2016–2017: Uhud Medina

Ryan White (born December 23, 1988) is an American professional basketball player who last played for Uhud Medina in Saudi Arabia.

In 2016, he played for Kožuv of the Macedonian First League.

== Professional career ==
During his career, White has played in Denmark, Kosovo, Luxembourg and Macedonia.
