= Trojan Arena =

Arena in Troy, Alabama

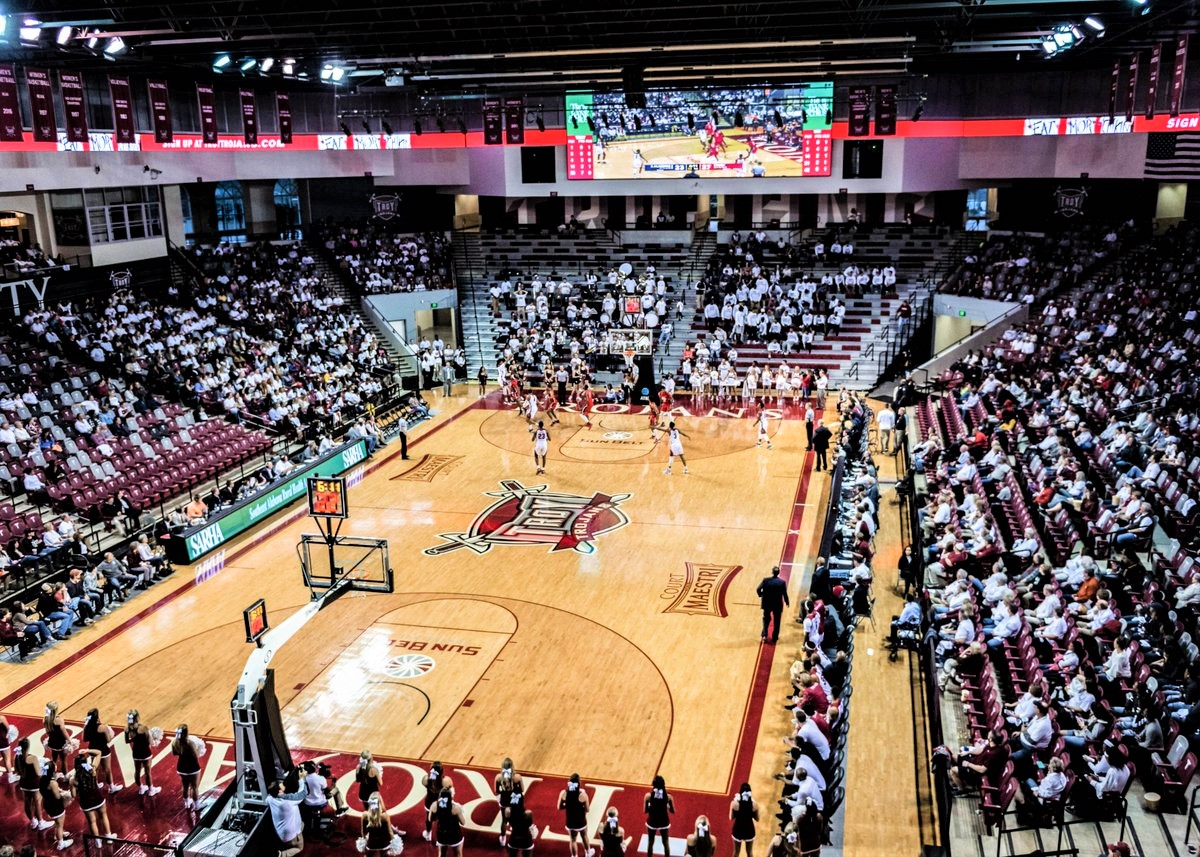
- Interactive map of Trojan Arena
- Location: 5000 Veterans Stadium Drive; Troy, Alabama 36082
- Coordinates: 31°48′8″N 85°57′17″W
- Owner: Troy University
- Operator: Troy University
- Seating type: Chairback, bench
- Capacity: 6,000
- Executive suites: 7
- Type: Arena
- Surface: Hard maple
- Scoreboard: Two Daktronics 15HD LED video boards (767 sq. ft.); Daktronics 360° Slim-LED Ribbon Board
- Record attendance: 5,120 (November 9, 2012 vs. Mississippi State)
- Public transit: Trojan Transportation

Construction
- Groundbreaking: March 3, 2010
- Built: 2012
- Opened: August 10, 2012
- Cost: $40-million ($73.8 million in 2025 dollars)
- Architects: Populous; Goodwyn, Mills, & Cawood
- Builder: Whaley Construction Co.
- General contractor: Hoar Construction

Tenants
- Troy Trojans men's basketball Troy Trojans women's basketball Troy Trojans women's volleyball

Trojan Arena is a 6,000-seat arena that is home to the Troy Trojans men's and women's basketball, volleyball and track programs. It is also used for the University's commencement ceremonies and special events. The arena replaced the University's longtime basketball and events facility, Sartain Hall, which opened in 1962. Trojan Arena has been considered to be one of the most modern and technologically advanced basketball facilities in the southeastern United States since it was completed in 2012. The total cost to build the arena was $40 million.

The arena is designed to be used for other multi-purpose reasons, including concerts, banquets, indoor sports tournaments, and graduation ceremonies.

The facility was constructed by Whaley Construction Company, and the architects were Goodwyn, Mills and Cawood, and Populous.

== Features ==
Trojan Arena seating features 5,200 chair-back seats, a band/student section with 600 bleacher seats, and seven upper-level suites and an exclusive Stadium Club area for donors, while also having floor seating for students and other guests. The arena features an indoor LED ribbon-board that stretches around the entire upper-level of the arena. The ribbon board is just one of only two of its kind in the Sun Belt Conference. Daktronics also designed, manufactured, and installed two 767-square-foot (71.3 m^{2}) 15HD LED video/scoring system boards, which are the largest end-wall installations Daktronics has ever produced for an indoor college facility. The court level of the arena features eight sections of Daktronics LED scorer’s tables as well. They each measure 2 feet (0.61 m) high by more than 9 feet (2.7 m) wide and can be connected in any configuration to showcase student athletes, display additional statistical information in real time, recognize sponsors and promote upcoming events. The arena was featured in LED Magazine for its use of state-of-the-art technology throughout the arena.

The lower-level of the arena features weight rooms, staff offices, player lounge, HD video rooms, recruit lounge, and locker rooms.

Among the other features of the arena are a three-tiered rotunda at the main entrance, an interior concourse with concession stands and a food court-styled dining center with specialty food items.

=== Indoor practice facility ===
Under the main playing court sits two full-size basketball courts that serve as basketball and volleyball practice areas. The 10,000-square-foot (930 m^{2}) space is shared by both the men's and women's basketball teams, as well as the indoor women's volley team.

=== Troy Sports Hall of Fame ===
The arena also is home to the Troy University Sports Hall of Fame. A unique design of this Hall of Fame facility was to include digital displays of its members, as well as touch-screen displays that showcase Troy sports history in all sports. The displays are located adjacent to the main entrance rotunda. These displays are the only ones of their kind in the Sun Belt Conference. The inaugural Hall of Fame Induction Banquet, held August 10, 2012, was the first event held in the new facility.

== Attendance records ==
Below is a list of Troy's top single-game attendance figures.

Trojan Arena's largest attendance of 5,120 took place on November 9, 2012 against the Mississippi State Bulldogs. Troy defeated the Bulldogs 56–53 in a thriller, with Troy guard Emil Jones draining a basket with only 1.6 seconds to win the game.

Attendance	Opponent	Year
5,120	Mississippi State	2012
5,110	South Alabama	2024
5,041	South Alabama	2025
5,010	UAB	2019
4,523	South Alabama	2020
4,546	South Alabama	2022

== Awards and recognition ==
- Listed as a Top 25 college basketball venue in Stadia Magazine for its interactive Hall of Fame, structural and architectural design, and use of high-definition LED video boards and LED lighting.
- Named "Most Outstanding Facility" in 2014 by Learning by Design magazine.
- Named as "Most Outstanding Design" in 2014 by the magazine of the American School and University.
- Featured in LED Magazine for its use of LED lighting technology throughout the arena.
- Recognized by Daktronics for its LED lighting and features, and its ShowControl System, which is noted for its data integration and video processing abilities.

== Gallery ==
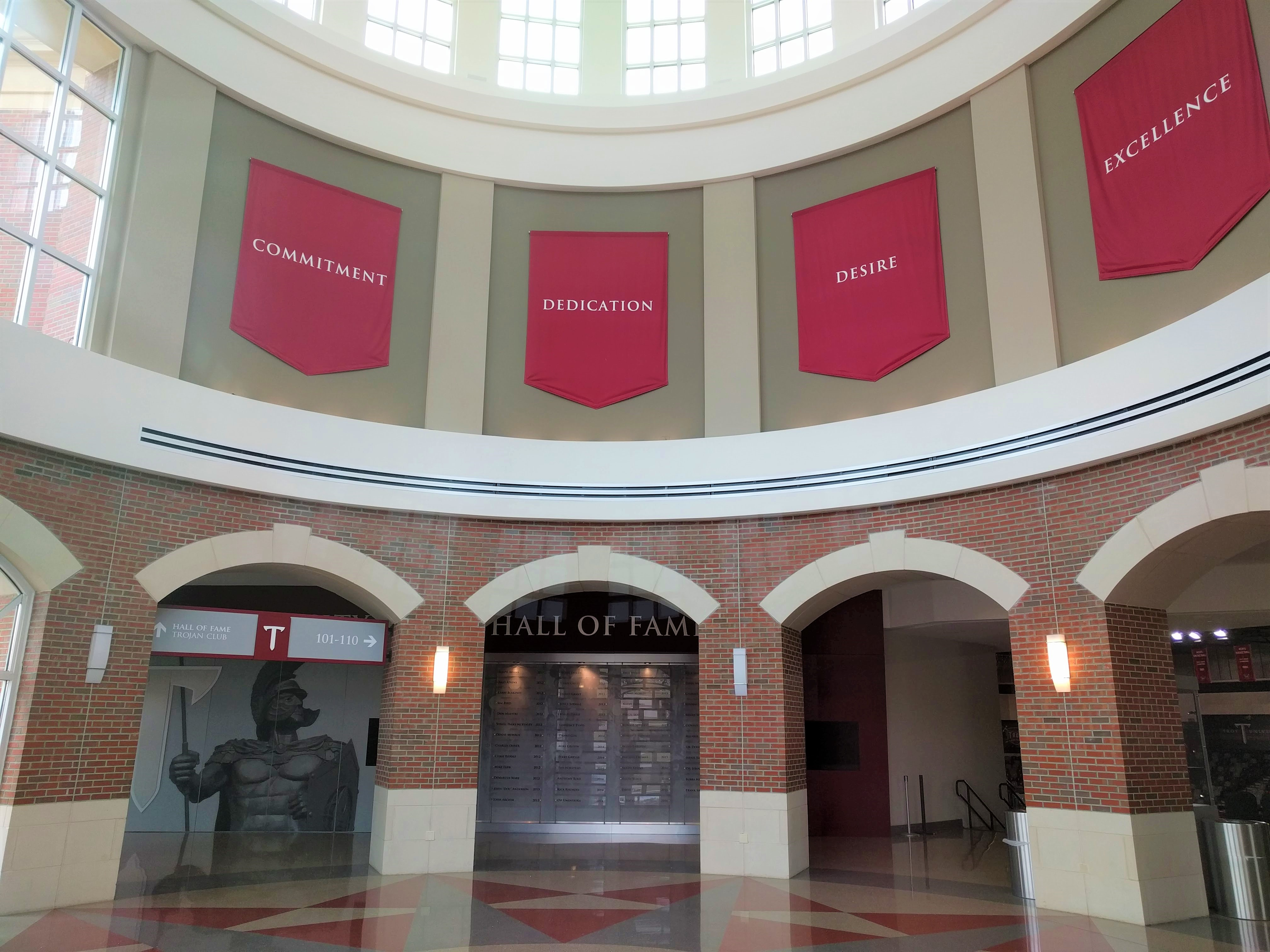
Main entrance rotunda

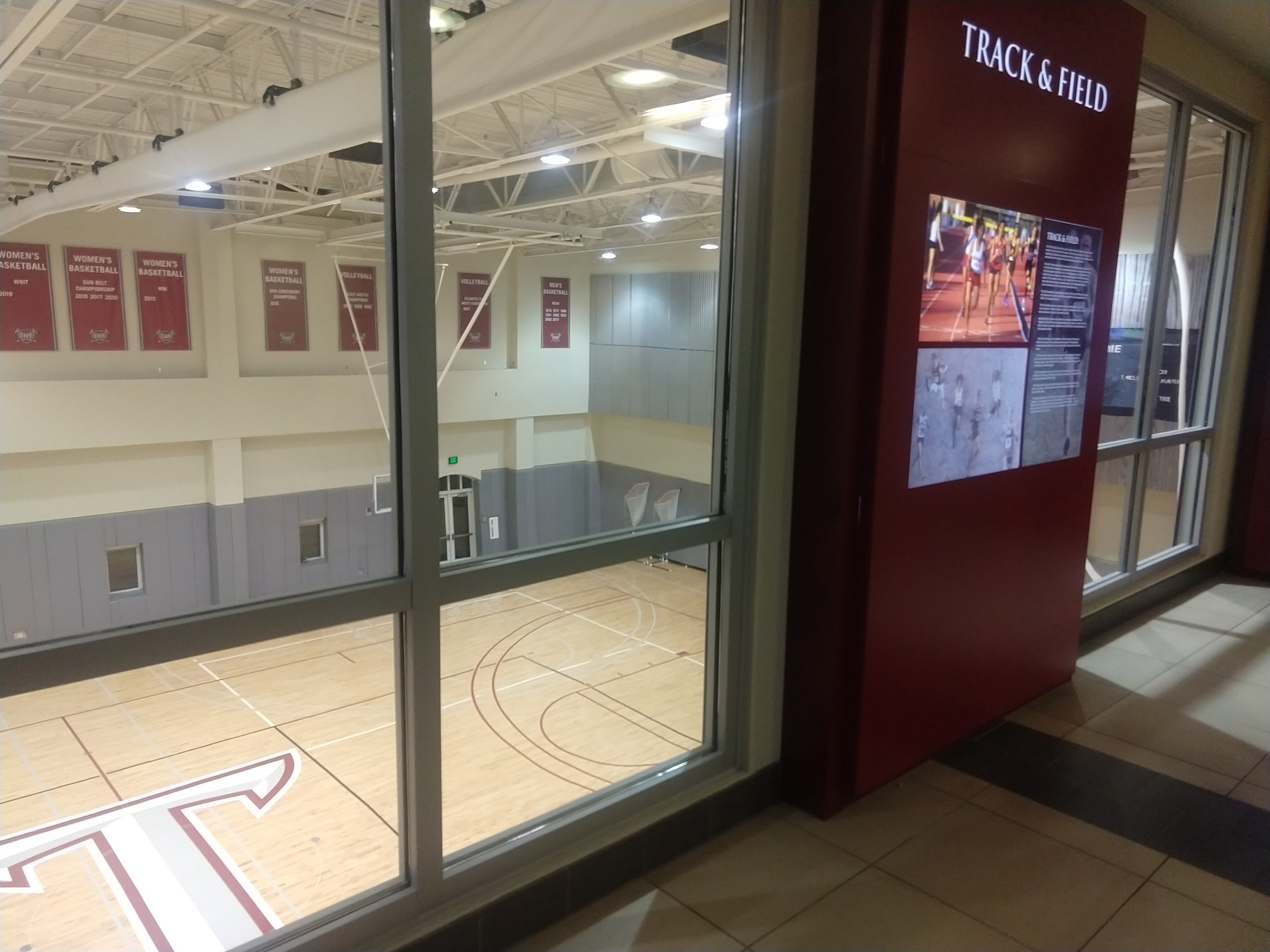
Practice courts

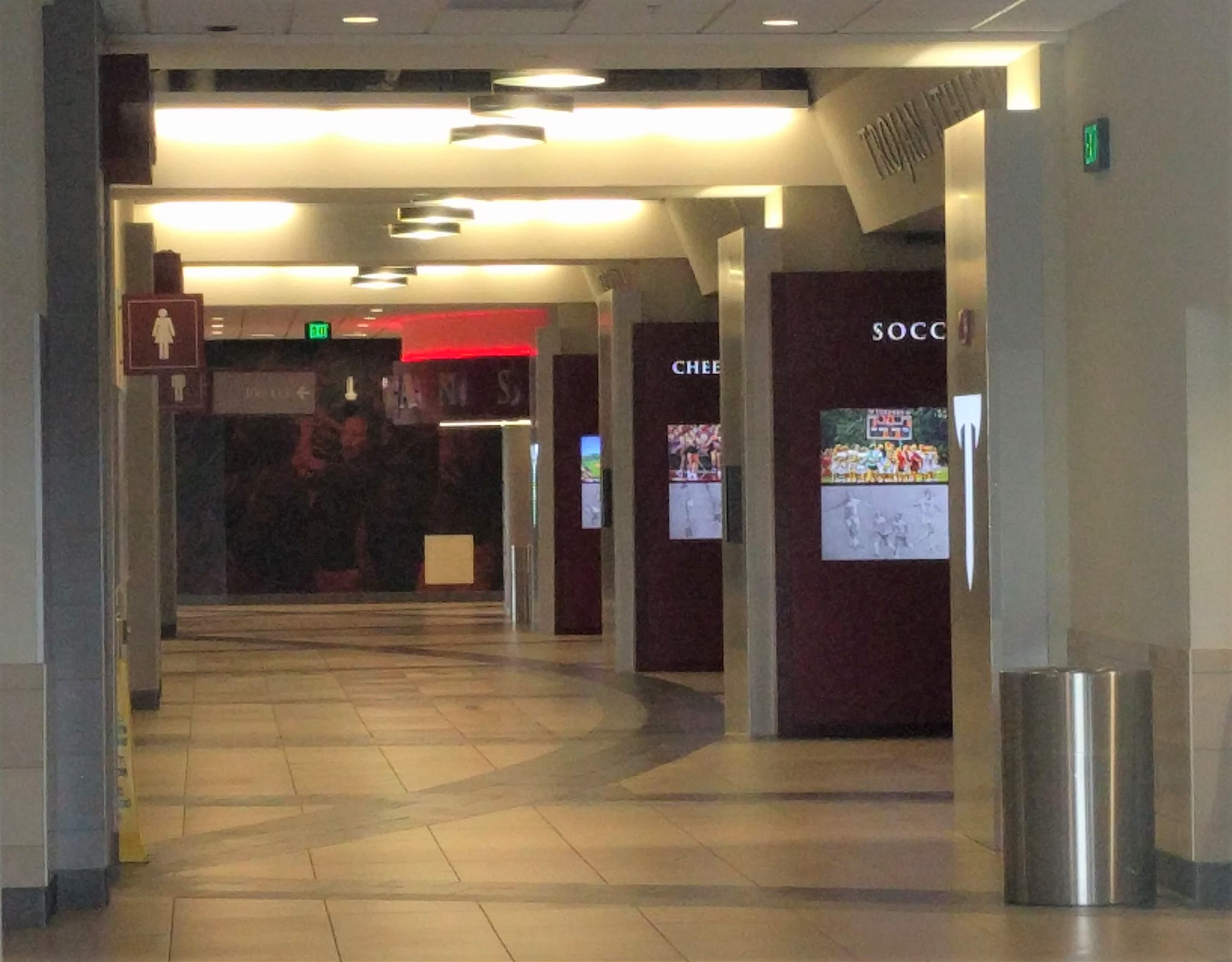
Digitally interactive Hall of Fame

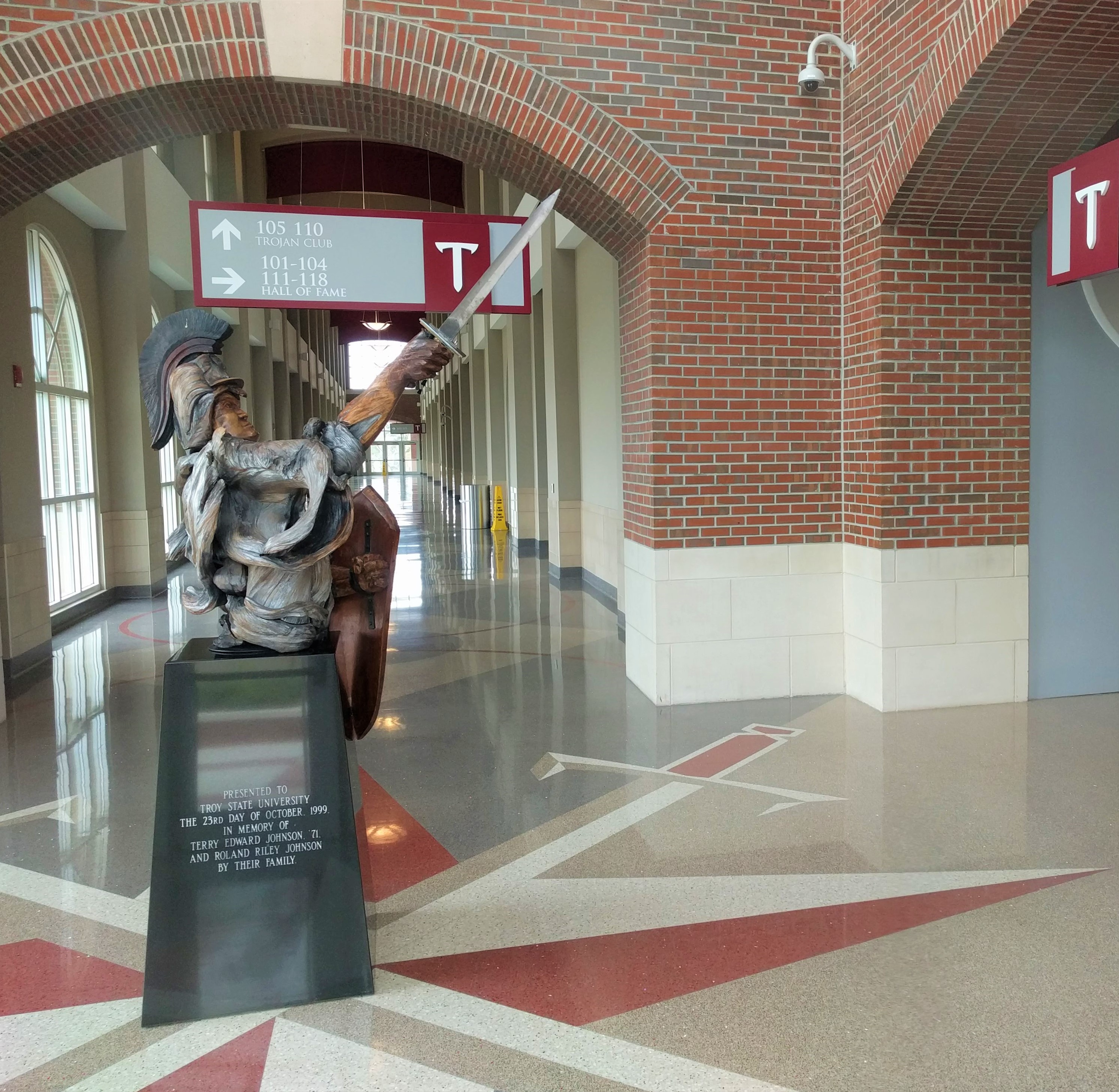
Alternate entrance with Trojan statue

== See also ==
- List of NCAA Division I basketball arenas
