= 2013–14 Kennesaw State Owls men's basketball team =

American college basketball season

2013–14 Kennesaw State Owls men's basketball
- Conference: Atlantic Sun Conference
- Record: 6–25 (3–15 A-Sun)
- Head coach: Lewis Preston (3rd season; first 15 games); Jimmy Lallathin (remainder of season)
- Assistant coaches: Jimmy Lallathin; Brian Lawhon; Mike Scutero
- Home arena: KSU Convocation Center

2013–14 Atlantic Sun men's basketball standings
	Conf.				Overall
Team	W		L	PCT	W		L	PCT
Mercer †	14	–	4	.778	27	–	9	.750
Florida Gulf Coast	14	–	4	.778	22	–	13	.629
USC Upstate	11	–	7	.611	19	–	15	.559
East Tennessee State	10	–	8	.556	19	–	16	.543
Lipscomb	10	–	8	.556	15	–	15	.500
North Florida	10	–	8	.556	16	–	16	.500
Jacksonville	8	–	10	.444	12	–	18	.400
Northern Kentucky*	5	–	13	.278	9	–	21	.300
Stetson	5	–	13	.278	7	–	24	.226
Kennesaw State	3	–	15	.167	6	–	25	.194
† 2014 Atlantic Sun Tournament winner Rankings from AP poll *Ineligible for postseason play due to Div. I transition

The 2013–14 Kennesaw State Owls men's basketball team represented Kennesaw State University during the 2013–14 NCAA Division I men's basketball season. The Owls, led by third year head coach Lewis Preston, played their home games at the KSU Convocation Center and were members of the Atlantic Sun Conference. They finished the season 6–25, 3–15 in A-Sun play to finish in last place. They failed to qualify for the Atlantic Sun tournament.

== Roster ==
Number	Name	Position	Height	Weight	Year	Hometown
1	Nigel Pruitt	Forward	6–7	180	Sophomore	Potomac, Maryland
2	Jordan Jones	Forward	6–8	205	Freshman	Alpharetta, Georgia
3	Delbert Love	Guard	6–0	185	Junior	Cleveland, Ohio
4	Yonel Brown	Guard	5–9	160	Sophomore	Lawrenceville, Georgia
5	Bernard Morena	Forward	6–8	200	Freshman	Ivory Coast
11	Myles Hamilton	Guard	6–1	190	Sophomore	Cleveland, Ohio
12	Nate Rucker	Forward	6–6	240	Junior	Memphis, Tennessee
13	Jordan Montgomery	Guard/Forward	6–5	170	Sophomore	Orlando, Florida
21	Kris Drees	Forward	6–6	210	Senior	Cumming, Georgia
23	Tanner Wozniak	Guard	6–5	185	Junior	St. Petersburg, Florida
24	Orlando Coleman	Forward	6–5	185	Junior	Pleasant Grove, Alabama
32	Charlie Byers	Guard	5–11	185	Junior	Cincinnati, Ohio
40	Drew McGhee	Forward	6–11	235	Senior	North Ridgeville, Ohio
45	Andrew Osemhen	Forward	6–9	270	Senior	Loganville, Georgia
50	Willy Kouassi	Center	6–10	230	Sophomore	Ivory Coast

== Schedule ==
Date time, TV	Opponent	Result	Record	Site (attendance) city, state
Exhibition
11/02/2013*; 7:00 pm	Covenant College	W 95–66		KSU Convocation Center (976); Kennesaw, GA
11/04/2013*; 7:00 pm	Piedmont	W 85–78		KSU Convocation Center (679); Kennesaw, GA
Regular season
11/08/2013*; 7:00 pm	Youngstown State; Kennesaw State Tournament	L 57–73	0–1	KSU Convocation Center (1,412); Kennesaw, GA
11/09/2013*; 5:30 pm	Eastern Kentucky; Kennesaw State Tournament	L 60–68	0–2	KSU Convocation Center (1,404); Kennesaw, GA
11/10/2013*; 3:30 pm	FIU; Kennesaw State Tournament	L 58–66	0–3	KSU Convocation Center (1,101); Kennesaw, GA
11/11/2013*; 11:00 am	Warren Wilson; Kennesaw State Tournament	W 92–48	1–3	KSU Convocation Center (1,201); Kennesaw, GA
11/14/2013*; 8:00 pm	at Mississippi State	L 55–78	1–4	Humphrey Coliseum (6,806); Starkville, MS
11/19/2013*; 7:00 pm	at Chattanooga	W 73–69	2–4	McKenzie Arena (3,028); Chattanooga, TN
11/24/2013*; 2:00 pm	IPFW	L 66–76	2–5	KSU Convocation Center (886); Kennesaw, GA
11/26/2013*; 7:00 pm	Truett-McConnell	W 73–54	3–5	KSU Convocation Center (884); Kennesaw, GA
11/29/2013*; 4:00 pm, ESPN3	at Cincinnati	L 67–95	3–6	Fifth Third Arena (6,627); Cincinnati, OH
12/01/2013*; 2:00 pm	at Kent State	L 51–68	3–7	MAC Center (1,994); Kent, OH
12/16/2013*; 7:00 pm, ESPN3	at Georgia Tech	L 57–74	3–8	McCamish Pavilion (5,972); Atlanta, GA
12/18/2013*; 7:00 pm	at Georgia Southern	L 55–73	3–9	Hanner Fieldhouse (1,159); Statesboro, GA
12/22/2013*; 12:00 pm, BTN	at Indiana	L 66–90	3–10	Assembly Hall (17,472); Bloomington, IN
12/30/2013; 7:00 pm	at North Florida	L 60–85	3–11 (0–1)	UNF Arena (642); Jacksonville, FL
01/01/2014; 7:00 pm	at Jacksonville	L 66–86	3–12 (0–2)	Swisher Gymnasium (207); Jacksonville, FL
01/04/2014; 12:00 pm, ESPN3	East Tennessee State	L 55–71	3–13 (0–3)	KSU Convocation Center (509); Kennesaw, GA
01/06/2014; 7:00 pm, ESPN3	USC Upstate	W 68–58	4–13 (1–3)	KSU Convocation Center (678); Kennesaw, GA
01/10/2014; 7:00 pm, CSS	at Mercer	L 46–83	4–14 (1–4)	Hawkins Arena (3,372); Macon, GA
01/16/2014; 7:00 pm	at Lipscomb	L 83–88	4–15 (1–5)	Allen Arena (641); Nashville, TN
01/18/2014; 7:00 pm	at Northern Kentucky	L 69–82	4–16 (1–6)	The Bank of Kentucky Center (1,783); Highland Heights, KY
01/23/2014; 7:00 pm, ESPN3	Stetson	L 65–68	4–17 (1–7)	KSU Convocation Center (1,823); Kennesaw, GA
01/25/2014; 12:00 pm, ESPN3	Florida Gulf Coast	L 62–83	4–18 (1–8)	KSU Convocation Center (1,671); Kennesaw, GA
01/31/2014; 7:00 pm	at USC Upstate	L 48–65	4–19 (1–9)	Hodge Center (611); Spartanburg, SC
02/02/2014; 2:00 pm	at East Tennessee State	L 73–86	4–20 (1–10)	ETSU/MSHA Athletic Center (2,303); Johnson City, TN
02/07/2014; 7:00 pm, CSS	Mercer	L 68–75	4–21 (1–11)	KSU Convocation Center (3,624); Kennesaw, GA
02/14/2014; 7:00 pm, ESPN3	Northern Kentucky	W 69–67	5–21 (2–11)	KSU Convocation Center (605); Kennesaw, GA
02/16/2014; 2:00 pm, ESPN3	Lipscomb	L 73–76	5–22 (2–12)	KSU Convocation Center (713); Kennesaw, GA
02/21/2014; 7:00 pm	at Stetson	W 67–63	6–22 (3–12)	Edmunds Center (538); DeLand, FL
02/23/2014; 1:30 pm	at Florida Gulf Coast	L 68–78	6–23 (3–13)	Alico Arena (4,458); Fort Myers, FL
02/27/2014; 7:00 pm, ESPN3	Jacksonville	L 69–71	6–24 (3–14)	KSU Convocation Center (1,108); Kennesaw, GA
03/01/2014; 1:00 pm, ESPN3	North Florida	L 77–87	6–25 (3–15)	KSU Convocation Center (1,471); Kennesaw, GA
*Non-conference game. ^{#}Rankings from AP Poll. (#) Tournament seedings in parentheses. All times are in Eastern Time.
