= 2013–14 USC Upstate Spartans men's basketball team =

American college basketball season

2013–14 USC Upstate Spartans men's basketball

CIT, First round
- Conference: Atlantic Sun Conference
- Record: 19–15 (11–7 A-Sun)
- Head coach: Eddie Payne (12th season)
- Assistant coaches: Kyle Perry; Kente Hart; Luke Payne
- Home arena: G. B. Hodge Center

2013–14 Atlantic Sun men's basketball standings
	Conf.				Overall
Team	W		L	PCT	W		L	PCT
Mercer †	14	–	4	.778	27	–	9	.750
Florida Gulf Coast	14	–	4	.778	22	–	13	.629
USC Upstate	11	–	7	.611	19	–	15	.559
East Tennessee State	10	–	8	.556	19	–	16	.543
Lipscomb	10	–	8	.556	15	–	15	.500
North Florida	10	–	8	.556	16	–	16	.500
Jacksonville	8	–	10	.444	12	–	18	.400
Northern Kentucky*	5	–	13	.278	9	–	21	.300
Stetson	5	–	13	.278	7	–	24	.226
Kennesaw State	3	–	15	.167	6	–	25	.194
† 2014 Atlantic Sun Tournament winner Rankings from AP poll *Ineligible for postseason play due to Div. I transition

The 2013–14 USC Upstate Spartans men's basketball team represented the University of South Carolina Upstate during the 2013–14 NCAA Division I men's basketball season. The Spartans, led by 12th year head coach Eddie Payne, played their home games at the G. B. Hodge Center and were members of the Atlantic Sun Conference. They finished the season 19–15, 11–7 in A-Sun play to finish in third place. They advanced to the semifinals of the Atlantic Sun tournament where they lost to Mercer. They were invited to the CollegeInsider.com Tournament where they lost in the first round to Towson.

== Roster ==
Number	Name	Position	Height	Weight	Year	Hometown
2	Daniel Bridges	Forward	6–7	180	Freshman	Inman, South Carolina
3	Karim Mawuenyega	Guard	6–0	170	Freshman	Douglasville, Georgia
5	Ty Greene	Guard	6–3	185	Junior	Knoxville, Tennessee
10	Josh Cuthbertson	Forward	6–5	185	Freshman	New Bern, North Carolina
12	Ricardo Glenn	Forward	6–8	246	Senior	Augusta, Georgia
14	Tristan Thomas	Guard	6–3	190	Sophomore	Bangor, Maine
15	ShunQuez Stephens	Forward	6–5	245	Sophomore	Flowery Branch, Georgia
21	Austin Grimes	Guard	6–3	195	Freshman	Cincinnati, Ohio
23	Torrey Craig	Forward	6–6	215	Senior	Great Falls, South Carolina
24	Jodd Maxey	Forward	6–8	200	Senior	Statham, Georgia
31	Mario Blessing	Guard	6–2	165	Junior	Kusterdingen, Germany
32	Fred Miller	Guard	6–4	200	Junior	Atlanta, Georgia
34	Babatunde Olumuyiwa	Forward/Center	6–8	220	Senior	Athens, Georgia
43	Racine Talla	Forward	6–8	195	Freshman	Dakar, Senegal
44	Michael Buchanan	Center	6–11	250	Freshman	Las Vegas, Nevada

== Schedule ==
Date time, TV	Opponent	Result	Record	Site (attendance) city, state
Regular season
11/09/2013*; 12:00 pm, ESPN3	at Virginia Tech	W 64–63	1–0	Cassell Coliseum (5,321); Blacksburg, VA
11/13/2013*; 7:00 pm	at Winthrop; Coaches Vs. Cancer Classic	L 74–82	1–1	Winthrop Coliseum (1,715); Rock Hill, SC
11/16/2013*; 7:00 pm, SportsSouth	at Tennessee	L 65–74	1–2	Thompson–Boling Arena (15,119); Knoxville, TN
11/21/2013*; 5:00 pm	vs. Niagara; Coaches Vs. Cancer Classic	W 83–74	2–2	MAC Center (382); Kent, OH
11/22/2013*; 7:30 pm	at Kent State; Coaches Vs. Cancer Classic	L 78–79	2–3	MAC Center (2,394); Kent, OH
11/23/2013*; 5:00 pm	vs. Western Carolina; Coaches Vs. Cancer Classic	W 72–58	3–3	MAC Center (316); Kent, OH
11/25/2013*; 7:00 pm, ESPN3	Bob Jones	W 94–67	4–3	Hodge Center (807); Spartanburg, SC
11/30/2013*; 2:00 pm, ESPN3	Tennessee State	W 73–64	5–3	Hodge Center (513); Spartanburg, SC
12/03/2013*; 7:00 pm, ESPN3	at Cincinnati	L 50–86	5–4	Fifth Third Arena (5,113); Cincinnati, Ohio
12/15/2013*; 3:00 pm, ESPN3	UNC Asheville	L 63–73	5–5	Hodge Center (513); Spartanburg, SC
12/19/2013*; 4:00 pm, SportsSouth	at South Carolina	W 74–68	6–5	Colonial Life Arena (7,531); Columbia, SC
12/21/2013*; 7:00 pm	at Charlotte	L 76–81	6–6	Halton Arena (4,042); Charlotte, NC
12/31/2013*; 5:00 pm, ESPN3	North Greenville	W 94–61	7–6	Hodge Center (622); Spartanburg, SC
01/04/2014; 4:30 pm	at Mercer	L 60–62 ^{OT}	7–7 (0–1)	Hawkins Arena (3,031); Macon, GA
01/06/2014; 7:00 pm, ESPN3	at Kennesaw State	L 58–68	7–8 (0–2)	KSU Convocation Center (678); Kennesaw, GA
01/09/2014; 7:00 pm, ESPN3	Northern Kentucky	W 73–64	8–8 (1–2)	Hodge Center (611); Spartanburg, SC
01/11/2014; 4:00 pm, ESPN3	Lipscomb	W 84–70	9–8 (2–2)	Hodge Center (611); Spartanburg, SC
01/16/2014; 7:00 pm, ESPN3	at Florida Gulf Coast	L 60–63	9–9 (2–3)	Alico Arena (4,580); Fort Myers, FL
01/18/2014; 1:00 pm	at Stetson	L 73–77 ^{OT}	9–10 (2–4)	Edmunds Center (679); DeLand, FL
01/23/2014; 7:30 pm, ESPN3	Jacksonville	W 79–69	10–10 (3–4)	Hodge Center (808); Spartanburg, SC
01/25/2014; 2:00 pm, ESPN3	North Florida	W 70–61	11–10 (4–4)	Hodge Center (857); Spartanburg, SC
01/31/2014; 7:00 pm, ESPN3	Kennesaw State	W 65–48	12–10 (5–4)	Hodge Center (611); Spartanburg, SC
02/02/2014; 4:00 pm, ESPN3	Mercer	W 80–61	13–10 (6–4)	Hodge Center (706); Spartanburg, SC
02/06/2014; 7:00 pm, ESPN3	at Lipscomb	L 75–77	13–11 (6–5)	Allen Arena (1,457); Nashville, TN
02/08/2014; 7:00 pm	at Northern Kentucky	W 76–59	14–11 (7–5)	The Bank of Kentucky Center (1,761); Highland Heights, KY
02/10/2014; 7:00 pm	at East Tennessee State; Postponed from 2/3	W 75–63	15–11 (8–5)	ETSU/MSHA Athletic Center (2,442); Johnson City, TN
02/15/2014; 2:00 pm, ESPN3	Florida Gulf Coast	L 80–84	15–12 (8–6)	Hodge Center (807); Spartanburg, SC
02/17/2014; 7:00 pm, ESPN3	Stetson; Postponed from 2/17	W 66–8	16–12 (9–6)	Hodge Center (630); Spartanburg, SC
02/20/2014; 7:30 pm	at North Florida	W 81–70	17–12 (10–6)	UNF Arena (1,466); Jacksonville, FL
02/22/2014; 3:15 pm	at Jacksonville	L 82–88	17–13 (10–7)	Jacksonville Veterans Memorial Arena (1,090); Jacksonville, FL
02/28/2014; 7:00 pm, CSS	East Tennessee State	L 73–79	18–13 (11–7)	Hodge Center (848); Spartanburg, SC
Atlantic Sun tournament
3/04/2014; 7:00 pm, ESPN3	North Florida; Quarterfinals	W 80–74	19–13	Hodge Center (715); Spartanburg, SC
3/06/2014; 8:30 pm, CSS/ESPN3	at Mercer; Semifinals	L 75–78 ^{2OT}	19–14	Hawkins Arena (2,572); Macon, GA
CIT
03/19/2014*; 7:00 pm	Towson; First round	L 60–63	19–15	Hodge Center (N/A); Spartanburg, SC
*Non-conference game. ^{#}Rankings from AP Poll. (#) Tournament seedings in parentheses. All times are in Eastern Time.
