= 2013–14 Mercer Bears men's basketball team =

American college basketball season

2013–14 Mercer Bears men's basketball

Atlantic Sun regular season co–champions and tournament champions

NCAA tournament, Round of 32
- Conference: Atlantic Sun Conference
- Record: 27–9 (14–4 A-Sun)
- Head coach: Bob Hoffman (6th season)
- Assistant coaches: Spencer Wright; Doug Esleeck; Jake Nelp
- Home arena: Hawkins Arena

2013–14 Atlantic Sun men's basketball standings
	Conf.				Overall
Team	W		L	PCT	W		L	PCT
Mercer †	14	–	4	.778	27	–	9	.750
Florida Gulf Coast	14	–	4	.778	22	–	13	.629
USC Upstate	11	–	7	.611	19	–	15	.559
East Tennessee State	10	–	8	.556	19	–	16	.543
Lipscomb	10	–	8	.556	15	–	15	.500
North Florida	10	–	8	.556	16	–	16	.500
Jacksonville	8	–	10	.444	12	–	18	.400
Northern Kentucky*	5	–	13	.278	9	–	21	.300
Stetson	5	–	13	.278	7	–	24	.226
Kennesaw State	3	–	15	.167	6	–	25	.194
† 2014 Atlantic Sun Tournament winner Rankings from AP poll *Ineligible for postseason play due to Div. I transition

The 2013–14 Mercer Bears men's basketball team represented Mercer University during the 2013–14 NCAA Division I men's basketball season. The Bears, led by sixth year head coach Bob Hoffman, played their home games at Hawkins Arena on the university's Macon, Georgia campus and were members of the Atlantic Sun Conference. They finished the season 27–9, 14–4 in A-Sun play to win the regular season A-Sun championship, shared with Florida Gulf Coast. They defeated Florida Gulf Coast in the championship game of the A-Sun tournament to be A-Sun Tournament champions and earn the conferences automatic bid to the NCAA tournament. In the NCAA Tournament, they upset Duke in the second round before losing in the third round to Tennessee.

This was their last season as a member of the Atlantic Sun as they joined the Southern Conference in July 2014.

== Roster ==
2013–14 Mercer Bears men's basketball team
Players
Coaches

Pos.	#	Name	Height	Weight	Year	Hometown
G	1	Phillip Leonard	6 ft 2 in (1.88 m)	200 lb (91 kg)	So	Tulsa, Oklahoma
G	2	Matt Panaggio	6 ft 3 in (1.91 m)	185 lb (84 kg)	Fr	Daytona Beach, Florida
G	3	Kevin Canevari	5 ft 11 in (1.8 m)	165 lb (75 kg)	Sr	Charlotte, North Carolina
F	5	Bud Thomas	6 ft 6 in (1.98 m)	200 lb (91 kg)	Sr	Highlands Ranch, Colorado
G	10	Ike Nwamu	6 ft 5 in (1.96 m)	205 lb (93 kg)	So	Greensboro, North Carolina
G	11	D. J. Brooks	6 ft 1 in (1.85 m)	180 lb (82 kg)	Fr	Simpsonville, South Carolina
G	12	John Mosser	6 ft 4 in (1.93 m)	210 lb (95 kg)	Fr	Cary, North Carolina
F	15	T. J. Hallice	6 ft 9 in (2.06 m)	205 lb (93 kg)	Jr	Weddington, North Carolina
G	15	Anthony White	6 ft 2 in (1.88 m)	170 lb (77 kg)	Sr	Indianapolis, Indiana
F	20	Jakob Gollon	6 ft 6 in (1.98 m)	200 lb (91 kg)	Sr	Stevens Point, Wisconsin
G	21	Langston Hall	6 ft 4 in (1.93 m)	180 lb (82 kg)	Sr	Atlanta, Georgia
F	22	Darious Moten	6 ft 6 in (1.98 m)	195 lb (88 kg)	Jr	Bowdon, Georgia
G	25	Lawrence Brown	6 ft 5 in (1.96 m)	210 lb (95 kg)	So	Kansas City, Missouri
F	32	James Bento	6 ft 6 in (1.98 m)	195 lb (88 kg)	Fr	Houston, Texas
G	34	Jibri Bryan	6 ft 3 in (1.91 m)	180 lb (82 kg)	So	Savannah, Georgia
C	45	Monty Brown	6 ft 11 in (2.11 m)	250 lb (113 kg)	Sr	Liberty Mounds, Oklahoma
F	52	Daniel Coursey	6 ft 10 in (2.08 m)	220 lb (100 kg)	Sr	Savannah, Georgia

Head coach

- Bob Hoffman (Oklahoma Baptist)

Assistant coach(es)

- Spencer Wright (Central Oklahoma)
- Doug Esleeck (North Carolina)
- Jake Nelp (Colorado State)

Legend

- (C) Team captain
- (S) Suspended
- (I) Ineligible
- (W) Walk-on
- Injured
- Current redshirt

== Schedule ==
Date time, TV	Rank^{#}	Opponent^{#}	Result	Record	Site (attendance) city, state
Regular season
11/08/2013*; 8:00 pm, LHN		at Texas	L 73–76	0–1	Frank Erwin Center (8,108); Austin, TX
11/13/2013*; 7:00 pm		Reinhardt	W 95–53	1–1	Hawkins Arena (1,872); Macon, GA
11/16/2013*; 3:00 pm		Seton Hall	W 77–74 ^{2OT}	2–1	Hawkins Arena (2,057); Macon, GA
11/18/2013*; 8:00 pm		at Evansville	L 76–89	2–2	Ford Center (3,607); Evansville, IN
11/20/2013*; 2:30 pm		vs. Johnson & Wales	W 109–56	3–2	Hawkins Arena (1,727); Macon, GA
11/23/2013*; 12:00 pm		Yale	W 81–54	4–2	Hawkins Arena (3,500); Macon, GA
11/26/2013*; 7:00 pm		at Ohio	L 67–76	4–3	Convocation Center (4,416); Athens, OH
11/29/2013*; 8:00 pm		at Valapraiso	W 117–108 ^{3OT}	5–3	Athletics–Recreation Center (2,574); Valparaiso, IN
12/02/2013*; 9:00 pm, ESPNU		at Oklahoma	L 82–96	5–4	Lloyd Noble Center (9,363); Norman, OK
12/07/2013*; 3:00 pm		Denver	W 64–63 ^{OT}	6–4	Hawkins Arena (1,827); Macon, GA
12/16/2013*; 7:00 pm		Alcorn State	W 70–44	7–4	Hawkins Arena (1,723); Macon, GA
12/22/2013*; 4:00 pm, CSS		at Ole Miss	W 79–76	8–4	Tad Smith Coliseum (7,794); Oxford, MS
12/27/2013*; 7:00 pm		St. Andrews (NC)	W 98–56	9–4	Hawkins Arena (2,117); Macon, GA
12/30/2013; 7:30 pm		at Jacksonville	W 86–49	10–4 (1–0)	Swisher Gymnasium (912); Jacksonville, FL
01/01/2014; 7:30 pm		at North Florida	L 83–89	10–5 (1–1)	UNF Arena (634); Jacksonville, FL
01/04/2014; 4:30 pm		USC Upstate	W 62–60 ^{OT}	11–5 (2–1)	Hawkins Arena (3,031); Macon, GA
01/06/2014; 7:00 pm		East Tennessee State	W 73–63	12–5 (3–1)	Hawkins Arena (1,537); Macon, GA
01/10/2014; 7:00 pm, CSS		Kennesaw State	W 83–46	13–5 (4–1)	Hawkins Arena (3,372); Macon, GA
01/16/2014; 7:00 pm		at Northern Kentucky	W 74–58	14–5 (5–1)	The Bank of Kentucky Center (2,782); Highland Heights, KY
01/18/2014; 4:30 pm, ESPN3		at Lipscomb	W 87–66	15–5 (6–1)	Allen Arena (1,235); Nashville, TN
01/23/2014; 7:00 pm		Florida Gulf Coast	W 68–55	16–5 (7–1)	Hawkins Arena (3,500); Macon, GA
01/25/2014; 3:00 pm		Stetson	W 87–49	17–5 (8–1)	Hawkins Arena (3,472); Macon, GA
01/31/2014; 7:00 pm		at East Tennessee State	W 90–77	18–5 (9–1)	ETSU/MSHA Athletic Center (3,350); Johnson City, TN
02/02/2014; 2:00 pm, ESPN3		at USC Upstate	L 61–80	18–6 (9–2)	Hodge Center (706); Spartanburg, SC
02/07/2014; 7:00 pm, CSS		at Kennesaw State	W 75–68	19–6 (10–2)	KSU Convocation Center (3,624); Kennesaw, GA
02/14/2014; 7:00 pm, ESPN3		Lipscomb	W 79–48	20–6 (11–2)	Hawkins Arena (1,872); Macon, GA
02/16/2014; 2:00 pm		Northern Kentucky	W 89–67	21–6 (12–2)	Hawkins Arena (2,172); Macon, GA
02/21/2014; 6:00 pm, ESPNU		at Florida Gulf Coast	L 61–75	21–7 (12–3)	Alico Arena (4,664); Fort Myers, FL
02/23/2014; 1:00 pm		at Stetson	W 73–52	22–7 (13–3)	Edmunds Center (1,015); DeLand, FL
02/27/2014; 7:00 pm		North Florida	L 76–79 ^{OT}	22–8 (13–4)	Hawkins Arena (2,134); Macon, GA
03/01/2014; 1:00 pm		Jacksonville	W 69–55	23–8 (14–4)	Hawkins Arena (N/A); Macon, GA
Atlantic Sun tournament
03/04/2014; 7:00 pm, ESPN3	(2)	(7) Jacksonville; Quarterfinals	W 85–64	24–8	Hawkins Arena (N/A); Macon, GA
03/06/2014; 8:30 pm, CSS/ESPN3	(2)	(3) USC Upstate; Semifinals	W 78–75 ^{2OT}	25–8	Hawkins Arena (2,572); Macon, GA
03/09/2014; 2:00 pm, ESPN2	(2)	at (1) Florida Gulf Coast; Championship	W 68–60	26–8	Alico Arena (4,702); Fort Myers, FL
NCAA tournament
3/21/2014; 12:15 pm, CBS	(14 MW)	vs. (3 MW) No. 8 Duke; Second round	W 78–71	27–8	PNC Arena (16,988); Raleigh, NC
3/23/2014; 6:10 pm, TNT	(14 MW)	vs. (11 MW) Tennessee; Third round	L 63–83	27–9	PNC Arena (18,712); Raleigh, NC
*Non-conference game. ^{#}Rankings from AP Poll, (#) during NCAA Tournament is seed within region MW=Midwest. (#) Tournament seedings in parentheses. All times are in Eastern Time.
