= 2013–14 East Tennessee State Buccaneers men's basketball team =

American college basketball season

2013–14 East Tennessee State Buccaneers men's basketball

CIT, Second round
- Conference: Atlantic Sun Conference
- Record: 19–16 (10–8 A-Sun)
- Head coach: Murry Bartow (11th season)
- Assistant coaches: Bob Bolen; Thomas Carr
- Home arena: ETSU/Mountain States Health Alliance Athletic Center; Freedom Hall Civic Center

2013–14 Atlantic Sun men's basketball standings
	Conf.				Overall
Team	W		L	PCT	W		L	PCT
Mercer †	14	–	4	.778	27	–	9	.750
Florida Gulf Coast	14	–	4	.778	22	–	13	.629
USC Upstate	11	–	7	.611	19	–	15	.559
East Tennessee State	10	–	8	.556	19	–	16	.543
Lipscomb	10	–	8	.556	15	–	15	.500
North Florida	10	–	8	.556	16	–	16	.500
Jacksonville	8	–	10	.444	12	–	18	.400
Northern Kentucky*	5	–	13	.278	9	–	21	.300
Stetson	5	–	13	.278	7	–	24	.226
Kennesaw State	3	–	15	.167	6	–	25	.194
† 2014 Atlantic Sun Tournament winner Rankings from AP poll *Ineligible for postseason play due to Div. I transition

The 2013–14 East Tennessee State Buccaneers basketball team represented East Tennessee State University during the 2013–14 NCAA Division I men's basketball season. The Buccaneers, led by 11th year head coach Murry Bartow, played their home games at the ETSU/Mountain States Health Alliance Athletic Center, with three home games at the Freedom Hall Civic Center, and were members of the Atlantic Sun Conference. They finished the season 19–16, 10–8 in A-Sun play to finish in a three way tie for fourth place. They advanced to the semifinals of the A-Sun tournament where they lost to Florida Gulf Coast. They were invited to the CollegeInsider.com Postseason Tournament where they defeated Chattanooga in the first round before losing in the second round to Towson.

This was their last season as a member of the Atlantic Sun as they will join the Southern Conference in July, 2014.

== Roster ==
Number	Name	Position	Height	Weight	Year	Hometown
0	Ron Giplaye	Forward	6–6	250	Junior	Lowell, Massachusetts
1	Petey McClain	Guard	6–0	185	Sophomore	Mobile, Alabama
2	Devin Harris	Guard	6–4	200	Freshman	Tampa, Florida
4	Rashawn Rembert	Guard	6–3	195	Junior	Tampa, Florida
5	Jalen Riley	Guard	6–0	150	Junior	Racine, Wisconsin
10	Isaac Banks	Forward	6–7	215	Freshman	New Orleans, Louisiana
11	Todd Halvorsen	Guard	6–3	190	Senior	Kingsport, Tennessee
13	A.J. Merriweather	Guard	6–2	185	Freshman	Jackson, Mississippi
15	Lester Wilson	Forward	6–4	215	Sophomore	Knoxville, Tennessee
20	Hunter Harris	Forward	6–7	235	Senior	Nashville, Tennessee
21	Tyler Ailshie	Guard	6–1	195	Junior	Kingsport, Tennessee
23	Darius Forrest	Forward	6–6	190	Junior	Jackson, Mississippi
32	Adam Denison	Forward	6–3	190	Freshman	Kingsport, Tennessee
34	Lukas Poderis	Forward	6–8	250	Senior	Port Richey, Florida
35	Kinard Gadsden-Gilliard	Forward	6–5	250	Senior	Georgetown, South Carolina

== Schedule ==
Date time, TV	Opponent	Result	Record	Site (attendance) city, state
Exhibition
10/29/2013*; 7:00 pm	Milligan	W 118–83		ETSU/MSHA Athletic Center (2,988); Johnson City, TN
11/02/2013*; 4:00 pm	Mars Hill	W 119–83		ETSU/MSHA Athletic Center (3,208); Johnson City, TN
Regular season
11/08/2013*; 7:30 pm	at Charlotte	L 75–80	0–1	Dale F. Halton Arena (4,796); Charlotte, NC
11/12/2013*; 4:00 pm	Morehead State	L 63–71	0–2	ETSU/MSHA Athletic Center (2,402); Johnson City, TN
11/16/2013*; 7:30 pm	at WKU	L 50–57	0–3	E. A. Diddle Arena (5,104); Bowling Green, KY
11/19/2013*; 7:00 pm	Winthrop	L 66–76	0–4	ETSU/MSHA Athletic Center (2,372); Johnson City, TN
11/21/2013*; 7:00 pm	Samford	W 89–75	1–4	Freedom Hall Civic Center (2,640); Johnson City, TN
11/23/2013*; 4:00 pm	Stephen F. Austin	W 66–58	2–4	Freedom Hall Civic Center (2,535); Johnson City, TN
11/27/2013*; 8:00 pm	at Tennessee Tech	L 83–98	2–5	Eblen Center (702); Cookeville, TN
11/30/2013*; 4:00 pm	Marshall	W 88–78	3–5	Freedom Hall Civic Center (3,016); Johnson City, TN
12/04/2013*; 8:00 pm	at Austin Peay	W 80–74	4–5	Dunn Center (2,273); Clarksville, TN
12/07/2013*; 2:00 pm	at Georgia Tech	L 57–87	4–6	Hank McCamish Pavilion (5,889); Atlanta, GA
12/16/2013*; 7:00 pm	Tusculum	W 108–87	5–6	ETSU/MSHA Athletic Center (2,231); Johnson City, TN
12/21/2013*; 4:00 pm	Austin Peay	W 84–79	6–6	ETSU/MSHA Athletic Center (2,257); Johnson City, TN
12/29/2013*; 4:00 pm	Valparaiso	W 73–62	7–6	ETSU/MSHA Athletic Center (2,462); Johnson City, TN
01/04/2014; 12:00 pm, ESPN3	at Kennesaw State	W 71–55	8–6 (1–0)	KSU Convocation Center (509); Kennesaw, GA
01/06/2014; 7:00 pm	at Mercer	L 63–73	8–7 (1–1)	Hawkins Arena (1,537); Macon, GA
01/09/2014; 7:00 pm	Lipscomb	L 80–82	8–8 (1–2)	ETSU/MSHA Athletic Center (2,227); Johnson City, TN
01/11/2014; 4:00 pm	Northern Kentucky	W 74–65	9–8 (2–2)	ETSU/MSHA Athletic Center (2,382); Johnson City, TN
01/16/2014; 7:00 pm	at Stetson	L 58–64	9–9 (2–3)	Edmunds Center (804); DeLand, FL
01/18/2014; 7:30 pm, ESPN3	at Florida Gulf Coast	L 62–90	9–10 (2–4)	Alico Arena (4,605); Fort Myers, FL
01/23/2014; 7:00 pm	North Florida	W 99–93	10–10 (3–4)	ETSU/MSHA Athletic Center (2,215); Johnson City, TN
01/25/2014; 4:00 pm	Jacksonville	W 76–75	11–10 (4–4)	ETSU/MSHA Athletic Center (2,600); Johnson City, TN
01/31/2014; 7:00 pm	Mercer	L 77–90	11–11 (4–5)	ETSU/MSHA Athletic Center (3,350); Johnson City, TN
02/02/2014; 2:00 pm	Kennesaw State	W 86–73	12–11 (5–5)	ETSU/MSHA Athletic Center (2,303); Johnson City, TN
02/06/2014; 7:00 pm	at Northern Kentucky	W 64–50	13–11 (6–5)	The Bank of Kentucky Center (1,368); Highland Heights, KY
02/08/2014; 5:00 pm, ESPN3	at Lipscomb	W 96–88	14–11 (7–5)	Allen Arena (4,078); Nashville, TN
02/10/2014; 7:00 pm	USC Upstate; Postponed from 2/3	L 63–75	14–12 (7–6)	ETSU/MSHA Athletic Center (2,442); Johnson City, TN
02/13/2014; 7:00 pm	Florida Gulf Coast	W 89–81	15–12 (8–6)	ETSU/MSHA Athletic Center (2,773); Johnson City, TN
02/15/2014; 4:00 pm	Stetson	W 93–66	16–12 (9–6)	ETSU/MSHA Athletic Center (3,166); Johnson City, TN
02/20/2014; 7:15 pm	at Jacksonville	L 86–91	16–13 (9–7)	Jacksonville Veterans Memorial Arena (988); Jacksonville, FL
02/22/2014; 7:00 pm	at North Florida	W 88–85	17–13 (10–7)	UNF Arena (1,931); Jacksonville, FL
02/28/2014; 7:00 pm, CSS	at USC Upstate	L 73–79	17–14 (10–8)	Hodge Center (848); Spartanburg, SC
Atlantic Sun tournament
03/04/2014; 7:00 pm	Lipscomb; Quarterfinals	W 89–88 ^{2OT}	18–14	ETSU/MSHA Athletic Center (2,523); Johnson City, TN
03/06/2014; 6:30 pm, CSS/ESPN3	at Florida Gulf Coast; Semifinals	L 64–69	18–15	Alico Arena (4,668); Fort Myers, FL
CIT
3/18/2014*; 7:00 pm	Chattanooga; First round	W 79–66	19–15	ETSU/MSHA Athletic Center (3,045); Johnson City, TN
3/21/2014*; 7:00 pm	Towson; Second round	L 77–83	19–16	ETSU/MSHA Athletic Center (2,033); Johnson City, TN
*Non-conference game. ^{#}Rankings from AP Poll. (#) Tournament seedings in parentheses. All times are in Eastern Time.
