= 2013–14 Florida Gulf Coast Eagles men's basketball team =

American college basketball season

2013–14 Florida Gulf Coast Eagles men's basketball
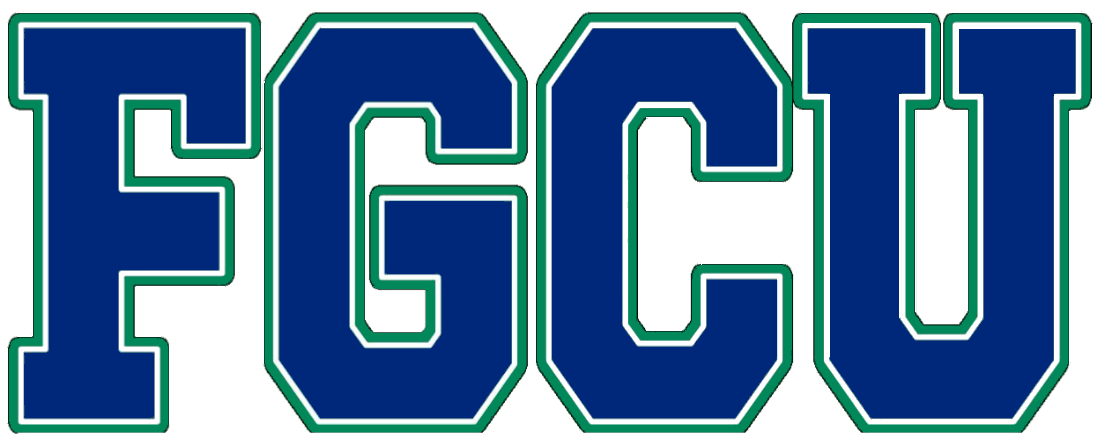

Atlantic Sun Regular Season Co–Champions

NIT, First round
- Conference: Atlantic Sun Conference
- Record: 22–13 (14–4 A-Sun)
- Head coach: Joe Dooley (1st season)
- Assistant coaches: Marty Richter (3rd season); Michael Fly (3rd season); Jamill Jones (1st season)
- Home arena: Alico Arena

2013–14 Atlantic Sun men's basketball standings
	Conf.				Overall
Team	W		L	PCT	W		L	PCT
Mercer †	14	–	4	.778	27	–	9	.750
Florida Gulf Coast	14	–	4	.778	22	–	13	.629
USC Upstate	11	–	7	.611	19	–	15	.559
East Tennessee State	10	–	8	.556	19	–	16	.543
Lipscomb	10	–	8	.556	15	–	15	.500
North Florida	10	–	8	.556	16	–	16	.500
Jacksonville	8	–	10	.444	12	–	18	.400
Northern Kentucky*	5	–	13	.278	9	–	21	.300
Stetson	5	–	13	.278	7	–	24	.226
Kennesaw State	3	–	15	.167	6	–	25	.194
† 2014 Atlantic Sun Tournament winner Rankings from AP poll *Ineligible for postseason play due to Div. I transition

The 2013–14 Florida Gulf Coast Eagles men's basketball team represented Florida Gulf Coast University (FGCU) in the 2013–14 NCAA Division I men's basketball season. FGCU was a member of the Atlantic Sun Conference and were the defending A-Sun Tournament champion. They played their home games at Alico Arena.

The team went through many changes for the 2013–14 season. Head coach Andy Enfield left to take the same job at USC and former Kansas assistant Joe Dooley takes over as head coach. Atlantic Sun Conference Men's Basketball Player of the Year Sherwood Brown graduated and turned professional, signing a contract with Israel's Maccabi Haifa B.C. in July 2013.

They finished the season 22–13, 14–4 in Atlantic Sun play to finish in a tie for the regular season conference championship with Mercer. At the Atlantic Sun Conference tournament they advanced to their third consecutive championship game where they lost to Mercer. Due to failing to win the conference tournament as the #1 seed, they earned an automatic bid to the 2014 National Invitation Tournament where they lost in the first round to Florida State.

== Pre-season ==
=== Coaching changes ===
Coach	Old Position	New Position
Andy Enfield	Head coach	USC Head Coach
Joe Dooley	Kansas Assistant	FGCU Head Coach
Martin Richter	FGCU Assistant	FGCU Assoc. Head Coach
Jamill Jones	Washington D.C.'s Nike Team Takeover Assistant	FGCU Assistant

=== Player changes ===
Player	Previous Institution	New Institution
Sherwood Brown	FGCU	Graduated
Eddie Murray	FGCU	Graduated
Jordan Neff	FGCU	Gordan State
Alexander Blessing	FGCU	Rollins
Christophe Varidel	FGCU	Chaminade
Leonard Livingston Jr.	FGCU	Pensacola State College
Logan Hovey	Paul J. Hagerty High School	FGCU
Brian Greene Jr.	Auburn	FGCU
Julian DeBose	Rice	FGCU
Marc-Eddy Norelia	Tulane	FGCU
Nick Pellar	Auburn	FGCU
Kevin Boyle Jr.	Emerson College	FGCU

== Roster ==
2013–14 Florida Gulf Coast Eagles men's basketball team
Players
Coaches

Pos.	#	Name	Height	Weight	Year	Previous school	Hometown
G	0	Brett Comer	6 ft 3 in (1.91 m)	192 lb (87 kg)	Jr	Winter Park High School	Winter Park, Florida
F/C	1	Nate Hicks	6 ft 10 in (2.08 m)	217 lb (98 kg)	RS Jr	J. R. Arnold High School	Panama City Beach, Florida
G	2	Bernard Thompson	6 ft 3 in (1.91 m)	166 lb (75 kg)	Jr	Rockdale County High School	Conyers, Georgia
G	3	Julian DeBose (redshirt)	6 ft 4 in (1.93 m)	196 lb (89 kg)	Jr	St. John's College High School	Washington, D.C.
G	4	Armand Shoon (W)	6 ft 3 in (1.91 m)	180 lb (82 kg)	Fr	Westwood Christian School	Miami, Florida
G	5	Jamail Jones	6 ft 6 in (1.98 m)	215 lb (98 kg)	RS Jr	Montverde Academy	Atlanta, Georgia
F	10	Logan Horvey (injured) (redshirt)	6 ft 7 in (2.01 m)	210 lb (95 kg)	Fr	Paul J. Hagerty High School	Orlando, Florida
F	11	Nick Pellar (W)	6 ft 6 in (1.98 m)	205 lb (93 kg)	So	IMG Academy	Munster, Indiana
F	12	Eric McKnight	6 ft 9 in (2.06 m)	210 lb (95 kg)	RS Jr	Princeton Day	Raleigh, North Carolina
G	14	Brian Greene Jr. (redshirt)	6 ft 3 in (1.91 m)	205 lb (93 kg)	So	IMG Academy	Chicago, Illinois
F	15	Filip Cvjeticanin	6 ft 9 in (2.06 m)	218 lb (99 kg)	Jr	The American School of Madrid	Zagreb, Croatia
F	20	Chase Fieler (C)	6 ft 8 in (2.03 m)	205 lb (93 kg)	Sr	Parkersburg South High School	Parkersburg, West Virginia
F	21	TeJai Allen (W)	6 ft 4 in (1.93 m)	198 lb (90 kg)	Fr	Fleming Island High School	Jacksonville, FL
G	22	Kevin Boyle Jr. (W)	5 ft 9 in (1.75 m)	175 lb (79 kg)	Jr	St. Patrick High School	Rahway, NJ
F	24	Marcus Blake (W)	6 ft 7 in (2.01 m)	196 lb (89 kg)	RS Jr	American Heritage School	Miami, Florida
F	25	Marc-Eddy Norelia (redshirt)	6 ft 8 in (2.03 m)	225 lb (102 kg)	So	Olympia High School	Orlando, Florida
G	35	Dajuan Graf	6 ft 0 in (1.83 m)	170 lb (77 kg)	So	Phillip O. Berry Academy	Charlotte, North Carolina

Head coach

- Joe Dooley (George Washington)

Assistant coach(es)

- Marty Richter (Simpson)
- Michael Fly (Kentucky)
- Jamill Jones (Arkansas Tech)

Legend

- (C) Team captain
- (S) Suspended
- (I) Ineligible
- (W) Walk-on
- Injured
- Current redshirt

Roster
Last update: February 12, 2014

== Schedule ==
Date time, TV	Rank^{#}	Opponent^{#}	Result	Record	Site (attendance) city, state
Non-conference regular season
November 8*; 9:00 pm, BTN		at Nebraska	L 55–79	0–1	Pinnacle Bank Arena (15,119); Lincoln, NE
November 12*; 7:00 am, ESPN2		Hartford; ESPN College Tip-Off Marathon	W 65–51	1–1	Alico Arena (4,525); Fort Myers, FL
November 15*; 6:00 pm, CSS		at Furman	W 70–69	2–1	Timmons Arena (1,657); Greenville, SC
November 18*; 7:05 pm, ASun.tv		Eckerd	W 72-55	3–1	Alico Arena (4,124); Fort Myers, FL
November 23*; 7:05 pm, ASun.tv		Ave Maria	W 79-56	4–1	Alico Arena (4,633); Fort Myers, FL
November 26*; 7:00 pm, ESPN3		at NC State	L 62–82	4–2	PNC Arena (11,123); Raleigh, NC
December 1*; 2:05 pm, ESPN3		Iona	L 72–90	4–3	Alico Arena (3,779); Fort Myers, FL
December 7*; 4:00 pm, FS1		at FIU	L 61–72	4–4	U.S. Century Bank Arena (2,085); Miami, FL
December 14*; 1:05 pm, ESPN3		Samford	W 83–51	5–4	Alico Arena (2,785); Fort Myers, FL
December 17*; 7:00 pm, ESPNU		South Florida; Las Vegas Classic	L 66–68 ^{2OT}	5–5	USF Sun Dome (4,105); Tampa, FL
December 19*; 9:00 pm, CSS		Mississippi State; Las Vegas Classic	L 53–66	5–6	Humphrey Coliseum (5,902); Starkville, MS
December 22*; 5:30 pm		Florida A&M; Las Vegas Classic	W 77–68	6–6	Orleans Arena (N/A); Paradise, NV
December 23*; 5:00 pm		Radford; Las Vegas Classic	L 63–64	6–7	Las Vegas Classic (N/A); Paradise, NV
Atlantic Sun regular season
December 30; 7:05 pm, ESPN3		Northern Kentucky	W 60-56	7–7 (1–0)	Alico Arena (4,534); Fort Myers, FL
January 1; 5:05 pm, ESPN3		Lipscomb	W 75-62	8–7 (2–0)	Alico Arena (3,368); Fort Myers, FL
January 5; 1:00 pm, CSS		at Stetson	W 68–55	9–7 (3–0)	Edmunds Center (1,248); DeLand, FL
January 9; 7:00 pm, ASun.tv		at North Florida	W 79–75	10–7 (4–0)	UNF Arena (3,181); Jacksonville, FL
January 11; 3:15 pm, ASun.tv		at Jacksonville	L 69–76	10–8 (4–1)	Jacksonville Veterans Memorial Arena (804); Jacksonville, FL
January 16; 7:05 pm, ESPN3		USC Upstate	W 63-60	11–8 (5–1)	Alico Arena (4,580); Fort Myers, FL
January 18; 7:33 pm, ESPN3		East Tennessee State	W 90–62	12–8 (6–1)	Alico Arena (4,605); Fort Myers, FL
January 23; 7:00 pm, Asun.TV		at Mercer	L 55–68	12–9 (6–2)	Hawkins Arena (3,500); Macon, GA
January 25; 12:00 pm, ESPN3		at Kennesaw State	W 83–62	13–9 (7–2)	KSU Convocation Center (1,671); Kennesaw, GA
January 31; 7:05 pm, CSS		Stetson	W 71–68	14–9 (8–2)	Alico Arena (4,633); Fort Myers, FL
February 6; 7:05 pm, ESPN3		Jacksonville	W 100–71	15–9 (9–2)	Alico Arena (4,416); Fort Myers, FL
February 8; 7:05 pm, ESPN3		North Florida	W 73–46	16–9 (10–2)	Alico Arena (4,633); Fort Myers, FL
February 13; 7:00 pm, Asun.TV		at East Tennessee State	L 81–89	16–10 (10–3)	ETSU/MSHA Athletic Center (2,773); Johnson City, TN
February 15; 2:00 pm, ESPN3		at USC Upstate	W 84–80	17–10 (11–3)	G. B. Hodge Center (807); Spartanburg, SC
February 21; 6:05 pm, ESPNU		Mercer	W 75–61	18–10 (12–3)	Alico, Arena (4,664); Fort Myers, FL
February 23; 1:35 pm, ESPN3		Kennesaw State	W 78–68	19–10 (13–3)	Alico, Arena (4,458); Fort Myers, FL
February 27; 7:00 pm, ESPN3		at Lipscomb	L 71–92	19–11 (13–4)	Allen Arena (2,942); Nashville, TN
March 1; 1:00 pm, ESPN3		at Northern Kentucky	W 92–72	20–11 (14–4)	The Bank of Kentucky Center (3,742); Highland Heights, KY
Atlantic Sun tournament
March 4; 7:00 pm, ESPN3	(1)	(8) Stetson; Quarterfinals	W 77–55	21–11	Alico Arena (4,673); Fort Myers, FL
March 6; 6:30 pm, CSS/ESPN3	(1)	(4) East Tennessee State; Semifinals	W 69–64	22–11	Alico Arena (4,668); Fort Myers, FL
March 9; 2:00 pm, ESPN2	(1)	(2) Mercer; Championship	L 60–68	22–12	Alico Arena (4,702); Fort Myers, FL
NIT
March 18*; 7:00 pm, ESPN2	(8)	at (1) Florida State; First round	L 53–58	22–13	Donald L. Tucker Civic Center (2,734); Tallahassee, FL
*Non-conference game. ^{#}Rankings from AP Poll, (#) during NIT is seed within region. (#) Tournament seedings in parentheses. All times are in Eastern Time.
