= 2013–14 Northern Kentucky Norse men's basketball team =

American college basketball season

2013–14 Northern Kentucky Norse men's basketball
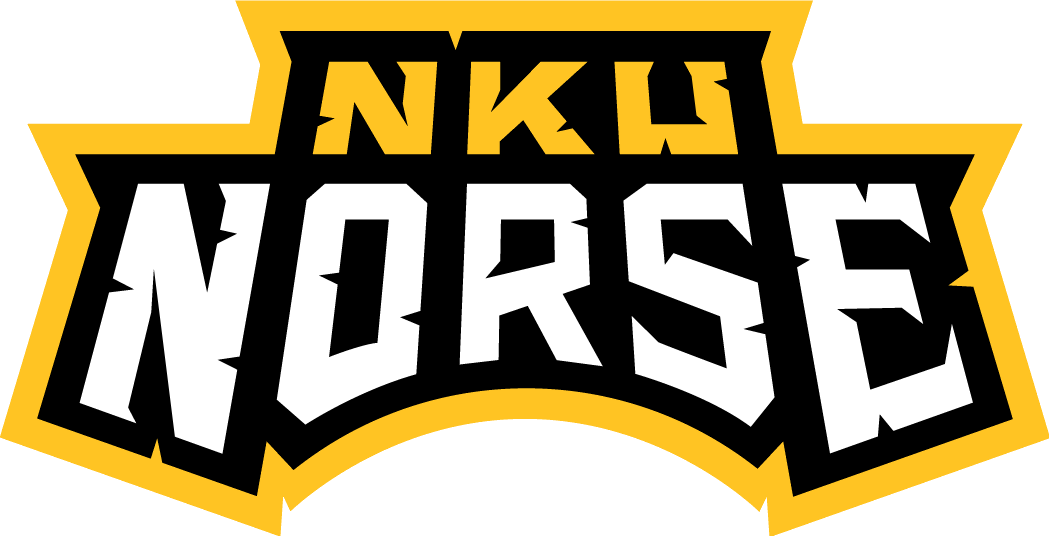
- Conference: Atlantic Sun Conference
- Record: 9–21 (5–13 A-Sun)
- Head coach: Dave Bezold (10th season)
- Assistant coaches: Kurt Young; Kevin Schappell; Donnie McFarland
- Home arena: The Bank of Kentucky Center

2013–14 Atlantic Sun men's basketball standings
	Conf.				Overall
Team	W		L	PCT	W		L	PCT
Mercer †	14	–	4	.778	27	–	9	.750
Florida Gulf Coast	14	–	4	.778	22	–	13	.629
USC Upstate	11	–	7	.611	19	–	15	.559
East Tennessee State	10	–	8	.556	19	–	16	.543
Lipscomb	10	–	8	.556	15	–	15	.500
North Florida	10	–	8	.556	16	–	16	.500
Jacksonville	8	–	10	.444	12	–	18	.400
Northern Kentucky*	5	–	13	.278	9	–	21	.300
Stetson	5	–	13	.278	7	–	24	.226
Kennesaw State	3	–	15	.167	6	–	25	.194
† 2014 Atlantic Sun Tournament winner Rankings from AP poll *Ineligible for postseason play due to Div. I transition

The 2013–14 Northern Kentucky Norse men's basketball team represented Northern Kentucky University during the 2013–14 NCAA Division I men's basketball season. The Norse, led by 10th year head coach Dave Bezold, played their home games at The Bank of Kentucky Center and were members of the Atlantic Sun Conference. They finished the season 9–21, 5–13 in A-Sun play to finish in a tie for eighth place. Due to their transition to Division I, the Norse will not be eligible to participate in post season play until 2017, including the Atlantic Sun Tournament.

== Roster ==
2013–14 Northern Kentucky Norse men's basketball team
Players
Coaches

Pos.	#	Name	Height	Weight	Year	Previous school	Hometown
F	1	Jack Flournoy	6 ft 6 in (1.98 m)	210 lb (95 kg)	So	Woodberry Forest	Mount Hope, West Virginia
G	2	Jordan Jackson	6 ft 2 in (1.88 m)	180 lb (82 kg)	Jr	Henry Sibley	St. Paul, Minnesota
G	5	Matt Rosenwinkel	6 ft 2 in (1.88 m)	200 lb (91 kg)	Fr	Rochelle Township	Rochelle, Illinois
G	10	Tyler White	6 ft 3 in (1.91 m)	180 lb (82 kg)	So	Lima Senior	Lima, Ohio
F	15	Daniel Camps	6 ft 5 in (1.96 m)	220 lb (100 kg)	Fr	Jack Britt	Fayetteville, North Carolina
C	20	Jake Giesler	6 ft 9 in (2.06 m)	230 lb (104 kg)	So	Newport Central Catholic	Fort Thomas, Kentucky
F	21	Jalen Billups	6 ft 6 in (1.98 m)	240 lb (109 kg)	So	Shroder	Cincinnati, Ohio
G	23	Todd Johnson	5 ft 9 in (1.75 m)	170 lb (77 kg)	So	Memorial	Elkhart, Indiana
G	24	Chad Jackson	6 ft 4 in (1.93 m)	195 lb (88 kg)	Sr	Scott County	Georgetown, Kentucky
G	25	Cole Murray	6 ft 7 in (2.01 m)	190 lb (86 kg)	Fr	Delphi	Delphi, Indiana
G	33	Anthony Monaco	6 ft 4 in (1.93 m)	185 lb (84 kg)	So	Dover	Dover, Ohio
F	35	Deontae Cole	6 ft 6 in (1.98 m)	190 lb (86 kg)	Fr	Central Catholic	Toledo, Ohio
F	40	Jared Bryant	6 ft 7 in (2.01 m)	240 lb (109 kg)	Jr	Roger Bacob	Cincinnati, Ohio
G	44	Dean Danos	5 ft 11 in (1.8 m)	160 lb (73 kg)	Fr	Bishop Noll	Oak Lawn, Illinois

Head coach

Dave Bezold (Viterbo)

Assistant coach(es)

- Kurt Young (Morehead State)
- Kevin Schappell (Northern Kentucky)
- Donnie McFarland

Legend

- (C) Team captain
- (S) Suspended
- (I) Ineligible
- (W) Walk-on
- Injured
- Current redshirt

Roster

== Schedule and results ==
Date time, TV	Opponent	Result	Record	Site (attendance) city, state
Non-conference regular season
November 8, 2013*; 7:00 pm	at Purdue	L 76–77	0–1	Mackey Arena (13,033); West Lafayette, IN
November 10, 2013*; 4:00 pm, FSN/UK IMG	at No. 1 Kentucky	L 63–93	0–2	Rupp Arena (22,925); Lexington, KY
November 16, 2013*; 7:00 pm	San Diego	L 44–75	0–4	The Bank of Kentucky Center (1,617); Highland Heights, KY
November 19, 2013*; 7:00 pm	Morehead State	L 61–74	0–4	The Bank of Kentucky Center (2,144); Highland Heights, KY
November 23, 2013*; 10:00 pm	at Tulane; Cure UCD Classic	W 91–86 ^{OT}	1–4	Devlin Fieldhouse (1,437); New Orleans, LA
November 29, 2013*; 7:30 pm	vs. Southeast Missouri State; Cure UCD Classic	L 65–79	1–5	Puerto Vallarta Convention Center (100); Puerto Vallarta, MX
November 30, 2013*; 7:30 pm	vs. Texas State; Cure UCD Classic	L 61–70	1–6	Puerto Vallarta Convention Center (100); Puerto Vallarta, MX
December 7, 2013*; 5:00 pm	at UT Martin	L 66–79	1–7	Skyhawk Arena (527); Martin, TN
December 15, 2013*; 12:00 pm	Chattanooga	W 87–71	2–7	The Bank of Kentucky Center (947); Highland Heights, KY
December 18, 2013*; 7:00 pm	Hampton	W 69–67 ^{OT}	3–7	The Bank of Kentucky Center (1,092); Highland Heights, KY
December 21, 2013*; 12:00 pm	Navy	W 72–65	4–7	The Bank of Kentucky Center (1,572); Highland Heights, KY
December 27, 2013*; 7:00 pm, ESPNU	at No. 19 North Carolina	L 60–75	4–8	Dean E. Smith Center (18,842); Chapel Hill, NC
Atlantic Sun regular season
December 30, 2013; 7:05 pm, ESPN3	at Florida Gulf Coast	L 56–60	4–9 (0–1)	Alico Arena (4,534); Fort Myers, FL
December 30, 2013; 7:00 pm	at Stetson	W 67–65 ^{OT}	5–9 (1–1)	Edmunds Center (211); DeLand, FL
January 4, 2014; 7:00 pm	Jacksonville	W 73–66	6–9 (2–1)	The Bank of Kentucky Center (1,507); Highland Heights, KY
January 6, 2014; 7:00 pm	North Florida	W 70–64	7–9 (3–1)	The Bank of Kentucky Center (927); Highland Heights, KY
January 9, 2014; 7:00 pm, ESPN3	at USC Upstate	L 64–73	7–10 (3–2)	G. B. Hodge Center (611); Spartanburg, SC
January 11, 2014; 4:00 pm	at East Tennessee State	L 65–74	7–11 (3–3)	ETSU/MSHA Athletic Center (2,382); Johnson City, TN
January 16, 2014; 7:00 pm	Mercer	L 58–74	7–12 (3–4)	The Bank of Kentucky Center (2,782); Highland Heights, KY
January 18, 2014; 7:00 pm	Kennesaw State	W 82–69	8–12 (4–4)	The Bank of Kentucky Center (1,783); Highland Heights, KY
January 24, 2014; 7:00 pm	Lipscomb	L 74–75	8–13 (4–5)	The Bank of Kentucky Center (2,006); Highland Heights, KY
January 30, 2014; 7:30 pm	at North Florida	L 66–67	8–14 (4–6)	UNF Arena (1,215); Jacksonville, FL
February 1, 2014; 3:15 pm	at Jacksonville	L 77–95	8–15 (4–7)	Swisher Gymnasium (727); Jacksonville, FL
February 6, 2014; 7:00 pm	East Tennessee State	L 50–64	8–16 (4–8)	The Bank of Kentucky Center (1,368); Highland Heights, KY
February 8, 2014; 7:00 pm	USC Upstate	L 59–76	8–17 (4–9)	The Bank of Kentucky Center (1,761); Highland Heights, KY
February 14, 2014; 7:30 pm, ESPN3	at Kennesaw State	L 67–69	8–18 (4–10)	KSU Convocation Center (605); Kennesaw, GA
February 16, 2014; 2:00 pm	at Mercer	L 67–89	8–19 (4–11)	Hawkins Arena (2,172); Macon, GA
February 21, 2014; 7:00 pm	at Lipscomb	L 66–70	8–20 (4–12)	Allen Arena (1,893); Nashville, TN
February 27, 2014; 7:00 pm	Stetson	W 96–58	9–20 (5–12)	The Bank of Kentucky Center (2,581); Highland Heights, KY
March 1, 2014; 1:00 pm	Florida Gulf Coast	L 72–92	9–21 (5–13)	The Bank of Kentucky Center (3,742); Highland Heights, KY
*Non-conference game. ^{#}Rankings from AP Poll. (#) Tournament seedings in parentheses. All times are in Eastern Time.
