= 2013–14 Jacksonville Dolphins men's basketball team =

American college basketball season

2013–14 Jacksonville Dolphins men's basketball
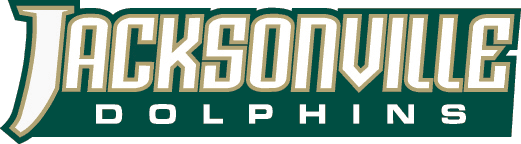
- Conference: Atlantic Sun Conference
- Record: 12–18 (8–10 A-Sun)
- Head coach: Cliff Warren (9th season)
- Assistant coaches: Winston Neal; Trevor Quinn; Willie Jones
- Home arena: Veterans Memorial Arena; Swisher Gymnasium

2013–14 Atlantic Sun men's basketball standings
	Conf.				Overall
Team	W		L	PCT	W		L	PCT
Mercer †	14	–	4	.778	27	–	9	.750
Florida Gulf Coast	14	–	4	.778	22	–	13	.629
USC Upstate	11	–	7	.611	19	–	15	.559
East Tennessee State	10	–	8	.556	19	–	16	.543
Lipscomb	10	–	8	.556	15	–	15	.500
North Florida	10	–	8	.556	16	–	16	.500
Jacksonville	8	–	10	.444	12	–	18	.400
Northern Kentucky*	5	–	13	.278	9	–	21	.300
Stetson	5	–	13	.278	7	–	24	.226
Kennesaw State	3	–	15	.167	6	–	25	.194
† 2014 Atlantic Sun Tournament winner Rankings from AP poll *Ineligible for postseason play due to Div. I transition

The 2013–14 Jacksonville Dolphins men's basketball team represented Jacksonville University during the 2013–14 NCAA Division I men's basketball season. The Dolphins were members of the Atlantic Sun Conference (A-Sun). They were led by ninth-year head coach Cliff Warren and played their home games in both the Veterans Memorial Arena and Swisher Gymnasium. They finished the season 12–18, 8–10 in A-Sun play, to finish in seventh place.

They lost in the quarterfinals of the Atlantic Sun tournament to Mercer.

== Roster ==
Number	Name	Position	Height	Weight	Year	Hometown
0	Javon Dawson	Forward	6–6	260	Senior	Cordele, GA
1	Jeremy Bogus	Guard	6–5	190	Junior	Birmingham, AL
2	Kordario Fleming	Forward	6–6	210	Sophomore	Memphis, TN
5	Vince Martin	Guard	6–2	200	Senior	Marietta, GA
10	Marcellous Bell	Guard	5–11	175	Sophomore	Hyattsville, MD
11	Jarvis Haywood	Guard	6–4	185	Sophomore	Charlotte, NC
13	Marcel White	Guard/Forward	6–6	200	Freshman	Lake Wales, FL
14	Omar El Manasterly	Forward	6–6	220	Freshman	Sugar Land, TX
15	J.R. Holder	Forward	6–7	180	Freshman	Atlanta, GA
21	Keith McDougald	Guard	6–1	205	Senior	Jacksonville, FL
22	Sam Hunt	Guard	6–2	170	Freshman	Greensboro, NC
33	R.J. Slawson	Forward	6–9	220	Senior	Charleston, SC
34	Josh Murray	Center	6–9	220	Freshman	Burlington, NC
44	Tyler Alderman	Center	6–9	235	Sophomore	Fishers, IN

== Schedule ==
Date time, TV	Opponent	Result	Record	Site (attendance) city, state
Regular season
11/08/2013*; 8:00 p.m.	at Florida State	L 67–91	0–1	Donald L. Tucker Center (5,761); Tallahassee, FL
11/12/2013*; 7:00 p.m.	Florida College	W 101–72	1–1	Swisher Gymnasium (1,001); Jacksonville, FL
11/16/2013*; 7:00 p.m.	at Gardner–Webb	L 78–87	1–2	Paul Porter Arena (2,350); Boiling Springs, NC
11/18/2013*; 8:00 p.m.	at Wake Forest	L 83–90	1–3	LJVM Coliseum (5,619); Winston-Salem, NC
11/23/2013*; 3:00 p.m.	Florida A&M	W 76–72	2–3	Jacksonville Veterans Memorial Arena (788); Jacksonville, FL
11/25/2013*; 7:00 p.m., FSFL	No. 15 Florida	L 60–86	2–4	Jacksonville Veterans Memorial Arena (5,625); Jacksonville, FL
12/03/2013*; 7:00 p.m.	Trinity Baptist	W 88–75	3–4	Swisher Gymnasium (744); Jacksonville, FL
12/07/2013*; 3:00 p.m.	at Florida Atlantic	L 63–83	3–5	FAU Arena (1,195); Boca Raton, FL
12/17/2013*; 7:00 p.m., ESPN3	at UCF	L 64–104	3–6	CFE Arena (4,123); Orlando, FL
12/20/2013*; 7:00 p.m.	Samford	L 58–75	3–7	Jacksonville Veterans Memorial Arena (353); Jacksonville, FL
12/23/2013*; 7:00 p.m.	South Carolina State	W 61–47	4–7	Jacksonville Veterans Memorial Arena (321); Jacksonville, FL
12/30/2013; 7:00 p.m.	Mercer	L 49–86	4–8 (0–1)	Swisher Gymnasium (912); Jacksonville, FL
01/01/2014; 7:00 p.m.	Kennesaw State	W 86–66	5–8 (1–1)	Swisher Gymnasium (207); Jacksonville, FL
01/04/2014; 7:00 p.m.	at Northern Kentucky	L 66–73	5–9 (1–2)	The Bank of Kentucky Center (1,507); Highland Heights, KY
01/06/2014; 6:00 p.m., ESPN3	at Lipscomb	W 88–85	6–9 (2–2)	Allen Arena (562); Nashville, TN
01/09/2014; 7:00 p.m.	Stetson	W 88–75	7–9 (3–2)	Jacksonville Veterans Memorial Arena (407); Jacksonville, FL
01/11/2014; 3:15 p.m.	Florida Gulf Coast	W 76–69	8–9 (4–2)	Jacksonville Veterans Memorial Arena (804); Jacksonville, FL
01/17/2014; 7:00 p.m.	at North Florida	L 82–86	8–10 (4–3)	UNF Arena (5,068); Jacksonville, FL
01/23/2014; 7:30 p.m., ESPN3	at USC Upstate	L 69–79	8–11 (4–4)	Hodge Center (808); Spartanburg, SC
01/25/2014; 4:00 p.m.	at East Tennessee State	L 75–76	8–12 (4–5)	ETSU/MSHA Athletic Center (2,600); Johnson City, TN
01/30/2014; 7:15 p.m.	Lipscomb	L 76–88	8–13 (4–6)	Jacksonville Veterans Memorial Arena (398); Jacksonville, FL
02/01/2014; 3:15 p.m.	Northern Kentucky	W 95–77	9–13 (5–6)	Jacksonville Veterans Memorial Arena (727); Jacksonville, FL
02/06/2014; 7:00 p.m., ESPN3	at Florida Gulf Coast	L 71–100	9–14 (5–7)	Alico Arena (4,416); Fort Myers, FL
02/08/2014; 1:00 p.m.	at Stetson	L 68–73	9–15 (5–8)	Edmunds Center (878); DeLand, FL
02/14/2014; 7:00 p.m.	North Florida	L 74–79	9–16 (5–9)	Jacksonville Veterans Memorial Arena (2,517); Jacksonville, FL
02/20/2014; 7:15 p.m.	East Tennessee State	W 91–86	10–16 (6–9)	Jacksonville Veterans Memorial Arena (988); Jacksonville, FL
02/22/2014; 3:15 p.m.	USC Upstate	W 88–82	11–16 (7–9)	Jacksonville Veterans Memorial Arena (1,090); Jacksonville, FL
02/27/2014; 7:00 p.m., ESPN3	at Kennesaw State	W 71–69	12–16 (8–9)	KSU Convocation Center (1,108); Kennesaw, GA
03/01/2014; 1:00 p.m.	at Mercer	L 55–69	12–17 (8–10)	Hawkins Arena (N/A); Macon, GA
Atlantic Sun tournament
03/04/2014; 7:00 p.m.	at Mercer; Quarterfinals	L 64–85	12–18	Hawkins Arena (N/A); Macon, GA
*Non-conference game. ^{#}Rankings from AP poll. (#) Tournament seedings in parentheses. All times are in Eastern.
