= 2013–14 Lipscomb Bisons men's basketball team =

American college basketball season

2013–14 Lipscomb Bisons men's basketball
- Conference: Atlantic Sun Conference
- Record: 15–15 (10–8 A-Sun)
- Head coach: Casey Alexander (1st season)
- Assistant coaches: Roger Idstrom; Dwight Evans; Steve Drabyn
- Home arena: Allen Arena

2013–14 Atlantic Sun men's basketball standings
| | Conf. | | | | Overall |
| Team | W | | L | PCT | W | | L | PCT |
|---|---|---|---|---|---|---|---|---|
| Mercer † | 14 | – | 4 | .778 | 27 | – | 9 | .750 |
| Florida Gulf Coast | 14 | – | 4 | .778 | 22 | – | 13 | .629 |
| USC Upstate | 11 | – | 7 | .611 | 19 | – | 15 | .559 |
| East Tennessee State | 10 | – | 8 | .556 | 19 | – | 16 | .543 |
| Lipscomb | 10 | – | 8 | .556 | 15 | – | 15 | .500 |
| North Florida | 10 | – | 8 | .556 | 16 | – | 16 | .500 |
| Jacksonville | 8 | – | 10 | .444 | 12 | – | 18 | .400 |
| Northern Kentucky* | 5 | – | 13 | .278 | 9 | – | 21 | .300 |
| Stetson | 5 | – | 13 | .278 | 7 | – | 24 | .226 |
| Kennesaw State | 3 | – | 15 | .167 | 6 | – | 25 | .194 |
† 2014 Atlantic Sun Tournament winner Rankings from AP poll *Ineligible for postseason play due to Div. I transition

The 2013–14 Lipscomb Bisons men's basketball team represented Lipscomb University during the 2013–14 NCAA Division I men's basketball season. The Bisons, led by first year head coach Casey Alexander, played their home games at Allen Arena and were members of the Atlantic Sun Conference. They finished the season 15–15, 10–8 in A-Sun play to finish in a three way tie for fourth place. They lost in the quarterfinals of the Atlantic Sun tournament to East Tennessee State.

== Roster ==
| Number | Name | Position | Height | Weight | Year | Hometown |
|---|---|---|---|---|---|---|
| 0 | Khion Sankey | Guard/Forward | 6–5 | 220 | Senior | Stockton, California |
| 1 | Cam Miller | Guard | 6–1 | 180 | Freshman | Franklin, Tennessee |
| 2 | Josh Williams | Guard | 6–4 | 218 | Freshman | Jackson, Mississippi |
| 3 | Carter Sanderson | Guard | 6–1 | 170 | Junior | Nashville, Tennessee |
| 5 | J.J. Butler | Guard | 6–3 | 195 | Sophomore | Abingdon, Maryland |
| 10 | Talbott Denny | Guard | 6–6 | 200 | Sophomore | Tucson, Arizona |
| 14 | Alex Brayboy | Guard | 6–6 | 185 | Junior | Alexandria, Virginia |
| 15 | Dylan Green | Guard | 6–4 | 200 | Sophomore | Anaheim Hills, CA |
| 20 | Chad Johnson | Guard | 6–0 | 185 | Junior | Edmond, Oklahoma |
| 21 | Charles Smith | Center | 6–9 | 210 | Freshman | Memphis, Tennessee |
| 22 | J.C. Hampton | Guard | 6–1 | 180 | Freshman | Gainesville, Georgia |
| 32 | Brett Wishon | Forward | 6–9 | 210 | Freshman | Concord, North Carolina |
| 35 | Martin Smith | Forward | 6–4 | 190 | Junior | Clarksville, Tennessee |
| 52 | Malcolm Smith | Forward | 6–5 | 210 | Junior | Clarksville, Tennessee |

== Schedule ==
| Date time, TV | Opponent | Result | Record | Site (attendance) city, state |
Exhibition
| 10/31/2013*; 7:00 pm | Freed-Hardeman | W 95–83 | | Allen Arena (1,962); Nashville, TN |
Regular season
| 11/03/2013*; 6:00 pm | Belmont | L 83–87 | 0–1 | Allen Arena (4,982); Nashville, TN |
| 11/11/2013*; 7:00 pm, ESPN3 | Oakland City | W 88–78 | 1–1 | Allen Arena (762); Nashville, TN |
| 11/15/2013*; 7:00 pm | at Vanderbilt | L 69–80 | 1–2 | Memorial Gymnasium (8,416); Nashville, TN |
| 11/18/2013*; 7:00 pm | at Tennessee State | W 75–70 | 2–2 | Gentry Complex (2,057); Nashville, TN |
| 11/20/2013*; 7:00 pm | at Belmont | L 64–94 | 2–3 | Curb Event Center (4,054); Nashville, TN |
| 11/25/2013*; 7:00 pm | at UT Martin | W 95–84 | 3–3 | Skyhawk Arena (1,776); Martin, TN |
| 11/30/2013*; 11:00 am, FSN | at Georgetown | L 49–70 | 3–4 | Verizon Center (8,165); Washington, D.C. |
| 12/05/2013*; 3:00 pm, ESPN3 | Tennessee Tech | W 87–79 | 4–4 | Allen Arena (687); Nashville, TN |
| 12/07/2013*; 3:00 pm | at Murray State | L 69–73 | 4–5 | CFSB Center (2,336); Murray, KY |
| 12/14/2013*; 3:00 pm | at Georgia | L 75–84 | 4–6 | Stegeman Coliseum (4,611); Athens, GA |
| 12/19/2013*; 7:00 pm | at Austin Peay | W 88–83 | 5–6 | Dunn Center (2,307); Clarksville, TN |
| 12/30/2013; 6:00 pm | at Stetson | L 63–65 | 5–7 (0–1) | Edmunds Center (511); DeLand, FL |
| 01/01/2014; 4:00 pm, ESPN3 | at Florida Gulf Coast | L 62–75 | 5–8 (0–2) | Alico Arena (3,368); Fort Myers, FL |
| 01/04/2014; 4:00 pm, ESPN3 | North Florida | L 73–78 | 5–9 (0–3) | Allen Arena (762); Nashville, TN |
| 01/06/2014; 5:00 pm, ESPN3 | Jacksonville | L 85–88 | 5–10 (0–4) | Allen Arena (562); Nashville, TN |
| 01/09/2014; 6:00 pm | at East Tennessee State | W 82–80 | 6–10 (1–4) | ETSU/MSHA Athletic Center (2,227); Johnson City, TN |
| 01/11/2014; 3:00 pm, ESPN3 | at USC Upstate | L 70–84 | 6–11 (1–5) | G. B. Hodge Center (611); Spartanburg, SC |
| 01/16/2014; 6:00 pm, ESPN3 | Kennesaw State | W 88–83 | 7–11 (2–5) | Allen Arena (641); Nashville, TN |
| 01/18/2014; 4:00 pm, ESPN3 | Mercer | L 66–87 | 7–12 (2–6) | Allen Arena (1,235); Nashville, TN |
| 01/24/2014; 6:00 pm, CSS | at Northern Kentucky | W 75–74 | 8–12 (3–6) | The Bank of Kentucky Center (2,006); Highland Heights, KY |
| 01/30/2014; 6:15 pm | at Jacksonville | W 88–76 | 9–12 (4–6) | Jacksonville Veterans Memorial Arena (398); Jacksonville, FL |
| 02/01/2014; 6:00 pm | at North Florida | W 60–58 | 10–12 (5–6) | UNF Arena (1,083); Jacksonville, FL |
| 02/06/2014; 6:00 pm, ESPN3 | USC Upstate | W 77–75 | 11–12 (6–6) | Allen Arena (1,457); Nashville, TN |
| 02/08/2014; 4:00 pm, ESPN3 | East Tennessee State | L 88–96 | 11–13 (6–7) | Allen Arena (4,078); Nashville, TN |
| 02/14/2014; 6:00 pm | at Mercer | L 48–79 | 11–14 (6–8) | Hawkins Arena (1,872); Macon, GA |
| 02/16/2014; 1:00 pm, ESPN3 | at Kennesaw State | W 76–73 | 12–14 (7–8) | KSU Convocation Center (713); Kennesaw, GA |
| 02/21/2014; 6:00 pm, CSS | Northern Kentucky | W 70–66 | 13–14 (8–8) | Allen Arena (1,893); Nashville, TN |
| 02/27/2014; 6:00 pm, ESPN3 | Florida Gulf Coast | W 92–71 | 14–14 (9–8) | Allen Arena (2,942); Nashville, TN |
| 03/01/2014; 10:00 am, ESPN3 | Stetson | W 83–76 | 15–14 (10–8) | Allen Arena (876); Nashville, TN |
Atlantic Sun tournament
| 03/04/2014; 7:00 pm, ESPN3 | at East Tennessee State; Quarterfinals | L 88–89 ^{2OT} | 15–15 | ETSU/MSHA Athletic Center (2,523); Johnson City, TN |
*Non-conference game. ^{#}Rankings from AP Poll. (#) Tournament seedings in parentheses. All times are in Central Time.
