= 2013–14 North Florida Ospreys men's basketball team =

American college basketball season

2013–14 North Florida Ospreys men's basketball
- Conference: Atlantic Sun Conference
- Record: 16–16 (10–8 A-Sun)
- Head coach: Matthew Driscoll (5th season)
- Assistant coaches: Bobby Kennen; Stephen Perkins; Byron Taylor
- Home arena: UNF Arena

2013–14 Atlantic Sun men's basketball standings
	Conf.				Overall
Team	W		L	PCT	W		L	PCT
Mercer †	14	–	4	.778	27	–	9	.750
Florida Gulf Coast	14	–	4	.778	22	–	13	.629
USC Upstate	11	–	7	.611	19	–	15	.559
East Tennessee State	10	–	8	.556	19	–	16	.543
Lipscomb	10	–	8	.556	15	–	15	.500
North Florida	10	–	8	.556	16	–	16	.500
Jacksonville	8	–	10	.444	12	–	18	.400
Northern Kentucky*	5	–	13	.278	9	–	21	.300
Stetson	5	–	13	.278	7	–	24	.226
Kennesaw State	3	–	15	.167	6	–	25	.194
† 2014 Atlantic Sun Tournament winner Rankings from AP poll *Ineligible for postseason play due to Div. I transition

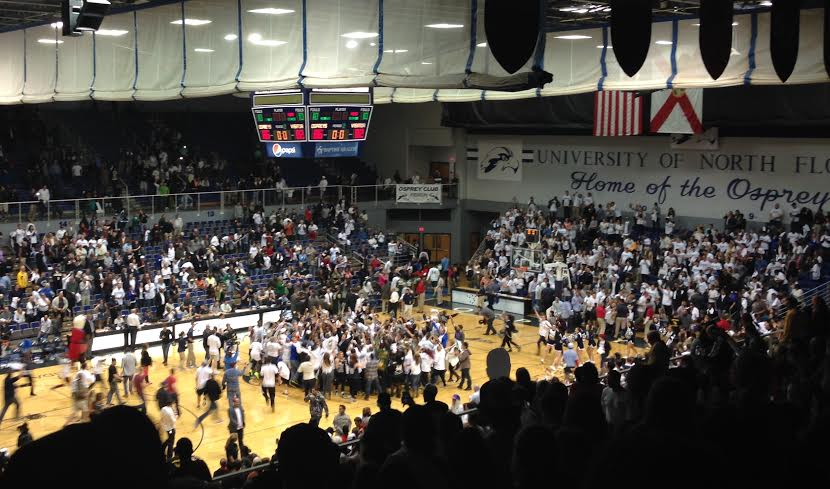
Fans storm the court after UNF defeated rival JU

The 2013–14 North Florida Ospreys men's basketball team represented the University of North Florida during the 2013–14 NCAA Division I men's basketball season. The Ospreys, led by fifth year head coach Matthew Driscoll, played their home games at the UNF Arena and were members of the Atlantic Sun Conference. They finished the season 16–16, 10–8 in A-Sun play to finish in a three way tie for fourth place. They lost in the quarterfinals of the Atlantic Sun tournament to USC Upstate.

== Previous season ==
The Ospreys finished the 2012–13 season with an overall record of 13–19, 8–10 record in conference play. In the Atlantic Sun Conference tournament, they were defeated in the quarterfinals by Florida Gulf Coast, 73–63.

== Roster ==
Number	Name	Position	Height	Weight	Year	Hometown
0	Jalen Nesbitt	Guard	6–6	200	Junior	Inman, South Carolina
1	Travis Wallace	Forward	6–6	230	Senior	Marietta, Georgia
2	Beau Beech	Guard	6–8	210	Sophomore	Ponte Vedra Beach, Florida
3	Sean Brennan	Guard	6–2	175	Freshman	Roswell, Georgia
4	Devin Wilson	Guard	5–11	175	Junior	Gainesville, Florida
5	Charles McRoy	Forward	6–6	210	Senior	Jacksonville, Florida
12	Aaron Bodager	Guard	6–5	195	Freshman	Oviedo, Florida
14	Dallas Moore	Guard	6–1	175	Freshman	St. Petersburg, Florida
15	Trent Mackey	Guard	6–4	180	Junior	Tampa, Florida
32	Demarcus Daniels	Forward	6–7	200	Sophomore	Ashburn, Georgia
33	Romelo Banks	Center	6–11	235	Freshman	Kissimmee, Florida
35	Chris Davenport	Forward	6–8	210	Freshman	Atlanta, Georgia

== Schedule and results ==
Date time, TV	Opponent	Result	Record	Site (attendance) city, state
Regular season
Nov. 8, 2013*; 3:00 p.m., Sun	at No. 10 Florida; Global Sports Challenge	L 69–77	0–1	O'Connell Center (10,550); Gainesville, FL
Nov. 11, 2013*; 8:00 p.m.	at Arkansas–Little Rock; Global Sports Challenge	W 72–70	1–1	Jack Stephens Center (3,012); Little Rock, AR
Nov. 13, 2013*; 8:00 p.m.	at Middle Tennessee; Global Sports Challenge	L 70–77	1–2	Murphy Center (4,212); Murfreesboro, TN
Nov. 16, 2013*; 7:00 p.m.	Southern; Global Sports Challenge	L 78–87	1–3	UNF Arena (1,794); Jacksonville, FL
Nov. 18, 2013*; 7:30 p.m.	Savannah State	W 66–63	2–3	UNF Arena (1,041); Jacksonville, FL
Nov. 21, 2013*; 7:00 p.m.	Webber International	W 109–64	3–3	UNF Arena (1,132); Jacksonville, FL
Nov. 26, 2013*; 7:00 p.m.	at Savannah State	W 65–61	4–3	Tiger Arena (630); Savannah, GA
Nov. 29, 2013*; 5:00 p.m., BTN	at No. 7 Ohio State	L 64–99	4–4	Value City Arena (14,758); Columbus, OH
Dec. 2, 2013*; 7:00 p.m.	Edward Waters	W 90–68	5–4	UNF Arena (1,291); Jacksonville, FL
Dec. 4, 2013*; 8:00 p.m., CSS	at Alabama	L 48–76	5–5	Coleman Coliseum (9,398); Tuscaloosa, AL
Dec. 7, 2013*; 7:30 p.m., BTN	at Indiana	L 68–89	5–6	Assembly Hall (17,472); Bloomington, IN
Dec. 17, 2013*; 7:00 p.m., BTN	at No. 5 Michigan State	L 48–78	5–7	Breslin Center (14,797); East Lansing, MI
Dec. 21, 2013*; 7:00 p.m.	Bethune-Cookman	W 68–64	6–7	UNF Arena (617); Jacksonville, FL
Dec. 30, 2013; 7:00 p.m.	Kennesaw State	W 85–60	7–7 (1–0)	UNF Arena (642); Jacksonville, FL
Jan. 1, 2014; 7:00 p.m.	Mercer	W 89–83	8–7 (2–0)	UNF Arena (634); Jacksonville, FL
Jan. 4, 2014; 5:00 p.m.	at Lipscomb	W 78–73	9–7 (3–0)	Allen Arena (762); Nashville, TN
Jan. 6, 2014; 7:00 p.m.	at Northern Kentucky	L 64–70	9–8 (3–1)	The Bank of Kentucky Center (927); Highland Heights, KY
Jan. 9, 2014; 7:00 p.m.	Florida Gulf Coast	L 75–79	9–9 (3–2)	UNF Arena (3,181); Jacksonville, FL
Jan. 11, 2014; 7:00 p.m.	Stetson	W 74–60	10–9 (4–2)	UNF Arena (1,411); Jacksonville, FL
Jan. 17, 2014; 7:00 p.m., CSS	Jacksonville	W 86–82	11–9 (5–2)	UNF Arena (5,068); Jacksonville, FL
Jan. 23, 2014; 7:00 p.m.	at East Tennessee State	L 93–99	11–10 (5–3)	ETSU/MSHA Athletic Center (2,215); Johnson City, TN
Jan. 25, 2014; 2:00 p.m.	at USC Upstate	L 61–70	11–11 (5–4)	G. B. Hodge Center (857); Spartanburg, SC
Jan. 30, 2014; 7:30 p.m.	Northern Kentucky	W 67–66	12–11 (6–4)	UNF Arena (1,215); Jacksonville, FL
Feb. 1, 2014; 7:00 p.m.	Lipscomb	L 58–60	12–12 (6–5)	UNF Arena (1,083); Jacksonville, FL
Feb. 6, 2014; 7:00 p.m.	at Stetson	W 54–52	13–12 (7–5)	Edmunds Center (638); DeLand, FL
Feb. 8, 2014; 7:05 p.m.	at Florida Gulf Coast	L 46–73	13–13 (7–6)	Alico Arena (4,633); Fort Myers, FL
Feb. 14, 2014; 7:00 p.m.	at Jacksonville	W 79–74	14–13 (8–6)	Veterans Memorial Arena (2,517); Jacksonville, FL
Feb. 20, 2014; 7:30 p.m.	USC Upstate	L 70–81	14–14 (8–7)	UNF Arena (1,466); Jacksonville, FL
Feb. 22, 2014; 7:00 p.m.	East Tennessee State	L 85–88	14–15 (8–8)	UNF Arena (1,931); Jacksonville, FL
Feb. 27, 2014; 7:00 p.m.	at Mercer	W 79–76 ^{OT}	15–15 (9–8)	Hawkins Arena (2,134); Macon, GA
Mar. 1, 2014; 1:00 p.m., ESPN3	at Kennesaw State	W 87–77	16–15 (10–8)	KSU Convocation Center (1,471); Kennesaw, GA
Atlantic Sun tournament
Mar. 4, 2014; 7:00 pm	at USC Upstate; Quarterfinals	L 74–80	16–16	G. B. Hodge Center (715); Spartanburg, SC
*Non-conference game. ^{#}Rankings from AP Poll. (#) Tournament seedings in parentheses. All times are in Eastern Time.
