= 2013–14 Stetson Hatters men's basketball team =

American college basketball season

2013–14 Stetson Hatters men's basketball
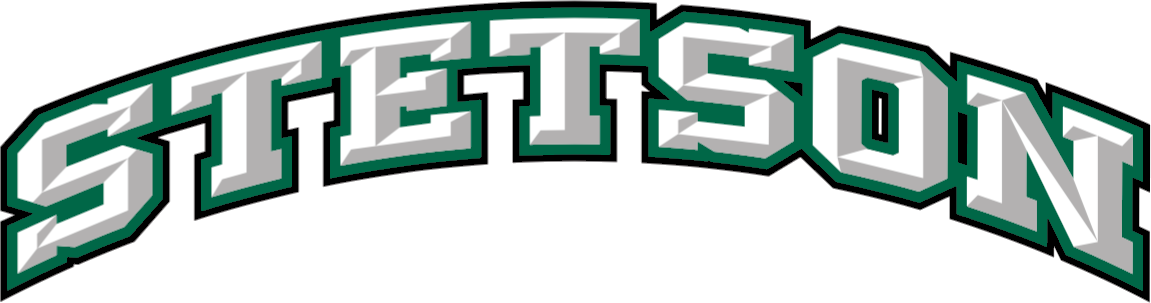
- Conference: Atlantic Sun Conference
- Record: 7–24 (5–13 A-Sun)
- Head coach: Corey Williams (1st season)
- Assistant coaches: Mike Jaskulski; Nikita Johnson; Bert Capel
- Home arena: Edmunds Center

2013–14 Atlantic Sun men's basketball standings
	Conf.				Overall
Team	W		L	PCT	W		L	PCT
Mercer †	14	–	4	.778	27	–	9	.750
Florida Gulf Coast	14	–	4	.778	22	–	13	.629
USC Upstate	11	–	7	.611	19	–	15	.559
East Tennessee State	10	–	8	.556	19	–	16	.543
Lipscomb	10	–	8	.556	15	–	15	.500
North Florida	10	–	8	.556	16	–	16	.500
Jacksonville	8	–	10	.444	12	–	18	.400
Northern Kentucky*	5	–	13	.278	9	–	21	.300
Stetson	5	–	13	.278	7	–	24	.226
Kennesaw State	3	–	15	.167	6	–	25	.194
† 2014 Atlantic Sun Tournament winner Rankings from AP poll *Ineligible for postseason play due to Div. I transition

The 2013–14 Stetson Hatters men's basketball team represented Stetson University during the 2013–14 NCAA Division I men's basketball season. The Hatters, led by first year head coach Corey Williams, played their home games at the Edmunds Center and were members of the Atlantic Sun Conference. They finished the season 7–24, 5–13 in A-Sun play to finish in a tie for eighth place. They lost in the quarterfinals of the Atlantic Sun tournament to Florida Gulf Coast.

== Roster ==
Number	Name	Position	Height	Weight	Year	Hometown
1	Raymone Andrews	Guard	6–2	180	Senior	Hammond, Louisiana
2	Kentwan Smith	Forward	6–8	205	Junior	Freeport, Bahamas
3	Willie Green	Forward	6–6	210	Senior	Orlando, Florida
4	B.J. Glasford	Guard	6–4	180	Freshman	Miami, Florida
10	Hunter Miller	Guard	6–1	180	Senior	Nashville, Tennessee
11	Aaron Graham	Guard	6–4	175	Senior	Miramar, Florida
12	Raekwon Harney	Guard	5–11	165	Freshman	Winston-Salem, North Carolina
15	Aidan Hadley	Forward	6–5	190	Sophomore	Owls Head, Maine
21	Andrew Zelis	Center	6–11	240	Freshman	Wheaton, Illinois
22	Tanner Plemmons	Guard	6–2	190	Sophomore	Franklin, North Carolina
23	Leke Solanke	Forward	6–6	215	Sophomore	Abeokuta, Nigeria
24	Cameron Harvey	Guard	6–3	210	Sophomore	Naperville, Illinois
33	Glenn Baral	Guard	6–3	205	Freshman	Richmond, California
40	Kyle Sikora	Center	7–0	255	Junior	Key Largo, Florida
41	Brian Pegg	Guard	6–7	205	Freshman	Clearwater, Florida

== Schedule ==
Date time, TV	Opponent	Result	Record	Site (attendance) city, state
Exhibition
10/26/2013*; 1:00 pm	Tampa	W 61–59		Edmunds Center (531); DeLand, FL
11/04/2013*; 7:00 pm	Palm Beach Atlantic	W 71–61		Edmunds Center (487); DeLand, FL
Regular season
11/08/2013*; 7:00 pm, ESPN3	at Clemson	L 51–71	0–1	Littlejohn Coliseum (5,200); Clemson, SC
11/10/2013*; 1:00 pm	at No. 21 Notre Dame	L 49–80	0–2	Purcell Pavilion (7,854); South Bend, IN
11/14/2012*; 7:00 pm	at Florida A&M	L 60–63	0–3	Al Lawson Center (1,345); Tallahassee, FL
11/18/2013*; 7:00 pm	at FIU	L 66–75	0–4	U.S. Century Bank Arena (1,524); Miami, FL
11/22/2013*; 7:00 pm	at South Florida	L 63–72	0–5	USF Sun Dome (3,782); Tampa, FL
11/25/2013*; 6:00 pm	vs. Wagner; Gulf Coast Showcase	L 64–81	0–6	Germain Arena (487); Estero, FL
11/26/2013*; 2:30 pm	vs. Southern Illinois; Gulf Coast Showcase	L 48–67	0–7	Germain Arena (N/A); Estero, FL
11/27/2013*; 12:00 pm	vs. UNC Greensboro; Gulf Coast Showcase	L 68–75	0–8	Germain Arena (N/A); Estero, FL
11/30/2013*; 1:00 pm	Davidson	L 80–86	0–9	Edmunds Center (449); DeLand, FL
12/03/2013*; 7:00 pm	Bethune-Cookman	W 56–52	1–9	Edmunds Center (1,056); DeLand, FL
12/07/2013*; 7:00 pm	at UCF	L 58–77	1–10	CFE Arena (4,203); Orlando, FL
12/17/2013*; 7:30 pm	Florida Atlantic	W 64–62	2–10	Edmunds Center (255); DeLand, FL
12/30/2013; 7:00 pm	Lipscomb	W 65–63	3–10 (1–0)	Edmunds Center (511); DeLand, FL
01/01/2014; 7:00 pm	Northern Kentucky	L 65–67 ^{OT}	3–11 (1–1)	Edmunds Center (211); DeLand, FL
01/05/2014; 1:00 pm, CSS	Florida Gulf Coast	L 55–68	3–12 (1–2)	Edmunds Center (1,248); DeLand, FL
01/09/2014; 7:00 pm	at Jacksonville	L 75–88	3–13 (1–3)	Jacksonville Veterans Memorial Arena (407); Jacksonville, FL
01/11/2014; 7:00 pm	at North Florida	L 60–74	3–14 (1–4)	UNF Arena (1,411); Jacksonville, FL
01/16/2014; 7:00 pm	East Tennessee State	W 64–58	4–14 (2–4)	Edmunds Center (804); DeLand, FL
01/18/2014; 1:00 pm	USC Upstate	W 77–73 ^{OT}	5–14 (3–4)	Edmunds Center (679); DeLand, FL
01/23/2014; 7:00 pm, ESPN3	at Kennesaw State	W 68–65	6–14 (4–4)	KSU Convocation Center (1,823); Kennesaw, GA
01/25/2014; 3:00 pm	at Mercer	L 49–87	6–15 (4–5)	Hawkins Arena (3,472); Macon, GA
01/31/2014; 7:00 pm, CSS	at Florida Gulf Coast	L 68–71	6–16 (4–6)	Alico Arena (4,633); Fort Myers, FL
02/06/2014; 7:00 pm	North Florida	L 52–54	6–17 (4–7)	Edmunds Center (638); DeLand, FL
02/08/2014; 1:00 pm	Jacksonville	W 73–68	7–17 (5–7)	Edmunds Center (878); DeLand, FL
02/15/2014; 4:00 pm	at East Tennessee State	L 66–93	7–18 (5–8)	ETSU/MSHA Athletic Center (3,166); Johnson City, TN
02/17/2014; 7:00 pm, ESPN3	at USC Upstate; Postponed from 2/13	L 48–66	7–19 (5–9)	Hodge Center (630); Spartanburg, SC
02/21/2014; 7:00 pm	Kennesaw State	L 63–67	7–20 (5–10)	Edmunds Center (538); DeLand, FL
02/23/2014; 1:00 pm	Mercer	L 52–73	7–21 (5–11)	Edmunds Center (1,015); DeLand, FL
02/27/2014; 7:00 pm	at Northern Kentucky	L 58–96	7–22 (5–12)	The Bank of Kentucky Center (2,581); Highland Heights, KY
03/01/2014; 11:00 am, ESPN3	at Lipscomb	L 76–83	7–23 (5–13)	Allen Arena (876); Nashville, TN
Atlantic Sun tournament
03/04/2014; 7:00 pm	at Florida Gulf Coast; Quarterfinals	L 55–77	7–24	Alico Arena (4,673); Fort Myers, FL
*Non-conference game. ^{#}Rankings from AP Poll. (#) Tournament seedings in parentheses. All times are in Eastern Time.
