= 2014 Atlantic Sun men's basketball tournament =

- Classification: Division I
- Season: 2013–14
- Teams: 8
- Site: Alico Arena; Fort Myers, FL
- Champions: Mercer (3rd title)
- Winning coach: Bob Hoffman (1st title)
- MVP: Langston Hall (Mercer)

2013–14 Atlantic Sun men's basketball standings
	Conf.				Overall
Team	W		L	PCT	W		L	PCT
Mercer †	14	–	4	.778	27	–	9	.750
Florida Gulf Coast	14	–	4	.778	22	–	13	.629
USC Upstate	11	–	7	.611	19	–	15	.559
East Tennessee State	10	–	8	.556	19	–	16	.543
Lipscomb	10	–	8	.556	15	–	15	.500
North Florida	10	–	8	.556	16	–	16	.500
Jacksonville	8	–	10	.444	12	–	18	.400
Northern Kentucky*	5	–	13	.278	9	–	21	.300
Stetson	5	–	13	.278	7	–	24	.226
Kennesaw State	3	–	15	.167	6	–	25	.194
† 2014 Atlantic Sun Tournament winner Rankings from AP poll *Ineligible for postseason play due to Div. I transition

The 2014 Atlantic Sun men's basketball tournament was the 36th edition of the Atlantic Sun Conference Championship. It took place from March 4 through March 9 in several arenas. All games took place at the higher seed of the two teams competing.

== Format ==
The A-Sun Championship was a six-day single-elimination tournament. The top eight teams (with the exception of Northern Kentucky) competed in the championship. As part of their transition to Division I from Division II, Northern Kentucky will not be eligible for post-season play until 2017, including the A-Sun tournament. The winner of the tournament earned the A-Sun's automatic bid into the 2014 NCAA tournament.

The top seed was the defending champion Florida Gulf Coast University.

== Seeds ==
Seed	School	Conference	Overall	Tiebreaker
1	Florida Gulf Coast	14–4	20–11	2–0 vs #3 USC Upstate
2	Mercer	14–4	23–8	1–1 vs #3 USC Upstate
3	USC Upstate	11–7	18–13	
4	East Tennessee State	10–8	17–14	3–1 vs. Lip./NF
5	Lipscomb	10–8	15–14	2–2 vs. ETS/NF
6	North Florida	10–8	16–15	1–3 vs. ETS/Lip.
7	Jacksonville	8–10	12–17	
8	Stetson	5–13	7–23	
Overall records are as of the end of the regular season.

== Bracket ==
Quarterfinals; March 4 ESPN3 / ASun.tv
1	Florida Gulf Coast	77
8	Stetson	55
4	East Tennessee State	89**
5	Lipscomb	88
2	Mercer	85
7	Jacksonville	64
3	USC Upstate	80
6	North Florida	74

Semifinals; March 6 CSS / ESPN3
1	Florida Gulf Coast	69
4	East Tennessee State	64
2	Mercer	78**
3	USC Upstate	75

Championship; March 9 ESPN2
1	Florida Gulf Coast	60
2	Mercer	68

* indicates overtime period

== See also ==
- 2013-14 NCAA Division I men's basketball season
- Atlantic Sun men's basketball tournament
