= 2013–14 Cincinnati Bearcats men's basketball team =

American college basketball season

2013–14 Cincinnati Bearcats men's basketball

AAC regular season co-champions

NCAA tournament, round of 64
- Conference: American Athletic Conference

Ranking
- Coaches: No. 22
- AP: No. 15
- Record: 27–7 (15–3 The American)
- Head coach: Mick Cronin (8th season)
- Assistant coaches: Larry Davis (8th season); Antwon Jackson (2nd season); Darren Savino (4th season)
- Home arena: Fifth Third Arena

2013–14 American Athletic Conference men's basketball standings
	Conf.				Overall
Team	W		L	PCT	W		L	PCT
No. 5 Louisville* †	15	–	3	.833	31	–	6	.838
No. 15 Cincinnati	15	–	3	.833	27	–	7	.794
No. 18 UConn	12	–	6	.667	32	–	8	.800
SMU	12	–	6	.667	27	–	10	.730
Memphis	12	–	6	.667	24	–	10	.706
Houston	8	–	10	.444	17	–	16	.515
Rutgers	5	–	13	.278	12	–	21	.364
UCF	4	–	14	.222	13	–	18	.419
Temple	4	–	14	.222	9	–	22	.290
South Florida	3	–	15	.167	12	–	20	.375
† The American Tournament winner As of March 15th, 2014; *Louisville: 29 reg. season games, 3 postseason games vacated due to sanctions against the program; Disputed Record-(31-6)(15-3); Rankings from AP poll

The 2013–14 Cincinnati Bearcats men's basketball team represented the University of Cincinnati during the 2013–14 NCAA Division I men's basketball season, The Bearcats competed in the American Athletic Conference, one of two offshoots of the original Big East Conference, and were coached by Mick Cronin in his eighth season. The team played its home games on Ed Jucker Court at the Fifth Third Arena. They finished the season 27–7, 15–3 in AAC play to share the regular season conference title with Louisville. They advanced to the semifinals of the AAC tournament where they lost to UConn. They received an at-large bid NCAA tournament where they lost in the second round to Harvard.

== Offseason ==
=== Departing players ===
Name	Number	Pos.	Height	Weight	Year	Hometown	Notes
Cashmere Wright	1	G	6'2'"	178	Senior	Savannah, Georgia	Graduated
Alex Eppensteiner	10	G	6'4'"	190	Senior	Cincinnati, Ohio	Walk on; graduated
Cheikh Mbodj	13	C	6'10'"	236	Senior	Dakar, Senegal	Graduated
Kelvin Gaines	24	F	6'10"	227	RS Sophomore	Ocala, Florida	Transferred to North Texas
JaQuon Parker	44	G	6'3'"	198	Senior	Suffolk, Virginia	Graduated

=== Recruiting class of 2013 ===
College recruiting information
Name	Hometown	School	Height	Weight	Commit date
Troy Caupain; SG	Midlothian, Virginia	Cosby High School	6 ft 3 in (1.91 m)	180 lb (82 kg)	Jun 8, 2012
Troy Caupain; SG	Recruit ratings: Scout: Rivals: 247Sports: (77)				
Kevin Johnson; SG	Cincinnati, Ohio	Summit Country Day School	6 ft 2 in (1.88 m)	175 lb (79 kg)	Jun 11, 2012
Kevin Johnson; SG	Recruit ratings: Scout: Rivals: 247Sports: (78)				
Jamaree Strickland; C	Oakland, California	Queen City Prep (NC)	6 ft 9 in (2.06 m)	230 lb (100 kg)	Nov 16, 2012
Jamaree Strickland; C	Recruit ratings: Scout: Rivals: 247Sports: (67)				
Deshaun Moorman; SG	Brandon, Florida	Faith Baptist School	6 ft 4 in (1.93 m)	190 lb (86 kg)	Nov 16, 2012
Deshaun Moorman; SG	Recruit ratings: Scout: Rivals: 247Sports: (72)				
Jermaine Lawrence; PF	Sparta, New Jersey	Pope John XXIII Regional High School	6 ft 9 in (2.06 m)	200 lb (91 kg)	Feb 3, 2013
Jermaine Lawrence; PF	Recruit ratings: Scout: Rivals: 247Sports: (88)				
Overall recruit ranking: 247Sports: 26 ESPN: 24
Note: In many cases, Scout, Rivals, 247Sports, On3, and ESPN may conflict in their listings of height and weight.; In these cases, the average was taken. ESPN grades are on a 100-point scale.; Sources: "Cincinnati 2013 Player Commits". ESPN.; "2013 Team Ranking". Rivals.

=== Recruiting class of 2014 ===
College recruiting information (2014)
Name	Hometown	School	Height	Weight	Commit date
Quadri Moore; C	Linden, NJ	Linden High School	6 ft 8 in (2.03 m)	230 lb (100 kg)	Sep 17, 2013
Quadri Moore; C	Recruit ratings: Scout: Rivals: 247Sports: (75)				
Gary Clark; PF	Clayton, NC	Clayton High School	6 ft 7 in (2.01 m)	230 lb (100 kg)	Sep 18, 2013
Gary Clark; PF	Recruit ratings: Scout: Rivals: 247Sports: (80)				
Overall recruit ranking: 247Sports: 31
Note: In many cases, Scout, Rivals, 247Sports, On3, and ESPN may conflict in their listings of height and weight.; In these cases, the average was taken. ESPN grades are on a 100-point scale.; Sources: "Cincinnati 2014 Player Commits". ESPN.; "2014 Team Ranking". Rivals.

=== Recruiting class of 2015 ===
College recruiting information (2015)
Name	Hometown	School	Height	Weight	Commit date
Jacob Evans; G	Baton Rouge, LA	St. Michael High School	6 ft 5 in (1.96 m)	190 lb (86 kg)	Oct 14, 2013
Jacob Evans; G	Recruit ratings: Scout: Rivals: 247Sports: (80)				
Overall recruit ranking: Scout: NR Rivals: NR 247Sports: NR ESPN: NR
Note: In many cases, Scout, Rivals, 247Sports, On3, and ESPN may conflict in their listings of height and weight.; In these cases, the average was taken. ESPN grades are on a 100-point scale.; Sources: "Cincinnati 2015 Player Commits". ESPN.; "2015 Team Ranking". Rivals.

== Roster ==
2013–14 Cincinnati Bearcats men's basketball team
Players
Coaches

Pos.	#	Name	Height	Weight	Year	Previous school	Hometown
G	0	Jeremiah Davis III (T)	6 ft 3 in (1.91 m)	204 lb (93 kg)	RS So	Huntington Prep	Muncie, Indiana
F	0	Derek Cox (W)	6 ft 3 in (1.91 m)	186 lb (84 kg)	RS Sr	Mason High School	Mason, Ohio
G	1	Deshaun Morman (injured) (redshirt)	6 ft 3 in (1.91 m)	190 lb (86 kg)	Fr	Faith Baptist Christian School	Richmond, Virginia
F	2	Titus Rubles (C)	6 ft 7 in (2.01 m)	220 lb (100 kg)	Sr	Blinn College	Dallas, Texas
F	3	Shaquille Thomas	6 ft 7 in (2.01 m)	205 lb (93 kg)	RS So	NIA Prep	Paterson, New Jersey
F	5	Justin Jackson (C)	6 ft 8 in (2.03 m)	230 lb (104 kg)	Sr	Arlington Country Day School	Cocoa Beach, Florida
G	10	Troy Caupain	6 ft 3 in (1.91 m)	200 lb (91 kg)	Fr	Cosby High School	Midlothian, Virginia
F	11	Jermaine Lawrence	6 ft 9 in (2.06 m)	205 lb (93 kg)	Fr	Pope John XXIII High School	Paterson, New Jersey
G	14	Ge'Lawn Guyn	6 ft 2 in (1.88 m)	185 lb (84 kg)	Jr	South Kent Prep	Georgetown, Kentucky
F	15	Jermaine Sanders	6 ft 5 in (1.96 m)	210 lb (95 kg)	Jr	Rice High School	Far Rockaway, New York
G/F	23	Sean Kilpatrick (C)	6 ft 4 in (1.93 m)	210 lb (95 kg)	RS Sr	Notre Dame Prep	White Plains, New York
G	25	Kevin Johnson	6 ft 2 in (1.88 m)	175 lb (79 kg)	Fr	Summit Country Day School	Cincinnati, Ohio
C	32	Jamaree Strickland (redshirt)	6 ft 10 in (2.08 m)	270 lb (122 kg)	Fr	Queen City Prep	Oakland, California
C	33	David Nyarsuk	7 ft 1 in (2.16 m)	230 lb (104 kg)	Sr	Mountain State University	Juba, South Sudan
F	45	Zack Tobler (W)	6 ft 5 in (1.96 m)	215 lb (98 kg)	Fr	Covington Catholic High School	Fort Mitchell, Kentucky

Head coach

- Mick Cronin (Cincinnati)

Assistant coach(es)

- Larry Davis (Asbury)
- Darren Savino (NJCU)
- Antwon Jackson (Pikeville)

Legend

- (C) Team captain
- (S) Suspended
- (I) Ineligible
- (W) Walk-on
- (T) Transferred
- Injured
- Current redshirt

Roster
Last update: 15 May 2020

- Dec 13, 2013 - Jeremiah Davis III elected to transfer to Ball State after the fall semester. After Davis's departure, Derek Cox joined the team as a walk-on.

=== Depth chart ===
Pos.	Starting 5	Bench 1	Bench 2
C	Justin Jackson	David Nyarsuk
PF	Titus Rubles	Jermaine Lawrence	Zack Tobler
SF	Shaq Thomas	Jermaine Sanders
SG	Sean Kilpatrick	Kevin Johnson	Derek Cox
PG	Ge'Lawn Guyn	Troy Caupain	Jeremiah Davis III

== Schedule ==
Date time, TV	Rank^{#}	Opponent^{#}	Result	Record	Site (attendance) city, state
Exhibition
October 26, 2013*; 2:00pm		Carleton	W 77–63	–	Fifth Third Arena (5,124); Cincinnati, OH
November 2, 2013*; 2:00pm		Bellarmine	W 84–72	–	Fifth Third Arena (5,578); Cincinnati, OH
Non-conference regular season
November 8, 2013*; 8:00pm, ESPN3		NC Central; Global Sports Shootout	W 74–61	1–0	Fifth Third Arena (6,532); Cincinnati, OH
November 12, 2013*; 5:00pm, ESPN		NC State; ESPN Tip-Off Marathon	W 68–57	2–0	Fifth Third Arena (7,028); Cincinnati, OH
November 16, 2013*; 2:00pm, FSOH		Appalachian State; Global Sports Shootout	W 77–49	3–0	Fifth Third Arena (6,194); Cincinnati, OH
November 20, 2013*; 7:00pm, ESPN3		Campbell; Global Sports Shootout	W 81–62	4–0	Fifth Third Arena (6,011); Cincinnati, OH
November 26, 2013*; 7:00pm, FSOH		UMass Lowell	W 79–49	5–0	Fifth Third Arena (5,477); Cincinnati, OH
November 29, 2013*; 4:00pm, FSOH		Kennesaw State	W 95–67	6–0	Fifth Third Arena (6,627); Cincinnati, OH
December 3, 2013*; 7:00 pm, ESPN3		USC Upstate	W 86–50	7–0	Fifth Third Arena (5,113); Cincinnati, OH
December 7, 2013*; 4:05pm, CBSSN		at New Mexico	L 54–63	7–1	The Pit (15,144); Albuquerque, NM
December 14, 2013*; 8:00pm, FS1		vs. Xavier; Crosstown Classic	L 47–64	7–2	U.S. Bank Arena (10,250); Cincinnati, OH
December 17, 2013*; 7:00pm, ESPN		vs. Pittsburgh; Jimmy V Classic	W 44–43	8–2	Madison Square Garden (8,062); New York, NY
December 21, 2013*; 2:00pm, FSOH		Middle Tennessee	W 69–48	9–2	Fifth Third Arena (5,424); Cincinnati, OH
December 23, 2013*; 7:00pm, ESPN3		Chicago State	W 102–62	10–2	Fifth Third Arena (5,564); Cincinnati, OH
December 28, 2013*; 4:00pm, ESPN2		Nebraska	W 74–59	11–2	Fifth Third Arena (8,254); Cincinnati, OH
American Athletic Conference regular season
January 1, 2014; 6:00pm, ESPNU		SMU	W 65–57	12–2 (1–0)	Fifth Third Arena (7,239); Cincinnati, OH
January 4, 2014; 12:00pm, ESPN2		at No. 18 Memphis; Rivalry	W 69–53	13–2 (2–0)	FedEx Forum (17,191); Memphis, TN
January 7, 2014; 9:00pm, CBSSN		at Houston	W 61–60	14–2 (3–0)	Hofheinz Pavilion (3,804); Houston, TX
January 11, 2014; 6:00pm, CBSSN		Rutgers	W 71–51	15–2 (4–0)	Fifth Third Arena (10,872); Cincinnati, OH
January 14, 2014; 9:00pm, CBSSN	No. 19	Temple	W 69–58	16–2 (5–0)	Fifth Third Arena (9,864); Cincinnati, OH
January 18, 2014; 5:00pm, ESPNU	No. 19	at South Florida	W 61–54	17–2 (6–0)	USF Sun Dome (5,322); Tampa, FL
January 23, 2014; 9:00pm, CBSSN	No. 15	UCF	W 69–51	18–2 (7–0)	Fifth Third Arena (10,242); Cincinnati, OH
January 26, 2014; 4:00pm, CBSSN	No. 15	at Temple	W 80–76	19–2 (8–0)	Liacouras Center (6,753); Philadelphia, PA
January 30, 2014; 7:00pm, ESPN	No. 13	at No. 12 Louisville; Rivalry	W 69–66	20–2 (9–0)	KFC Yum! Center (22,644); Louisville, KY
February 2, 2014; 12:00pm, CBSSN	No. 13	South Florida	W 50–45	21–2 (10–0)	Fifth Third Arena (10,367); Cincinnati, OH
February 6, 2014; 7:00pm, ESPN	No. 7	No. 22 UConn	W 63–58	22–2 (11–0)	Fifth Third Arena (12,432); Cincinnati, OH
February 8, 2014; 7:30pm, ESPNU	No. 7	at SMU	L 55–76	22–3 (11–1)	Moody Coliseum (7,278); University Park, TX
February 15, 2014; 3:00pm, ESPNU	No. 10	Houston	W 73–62	23–3 (12–1)	Fifth Third Arena (13,176); Cincinnati, OH
February 19, 2014; 7:00pm, ESPNU	No. 7	at UCF	W 77–49	24–3 (13–1)	CFE Arena (5,637); Orlando, FL
February 22, 2014; 12:00pm, CBS	No. 7	No. 11 Louisville; Rivalry	L 57–58	24–4 (13–2)	Fifth Third Arena (13,176); Cincinnati, OH
March 1, 2014; 12:00pm, ESPN	No. 11	at UConn	L 45–51	24–5 (13–3)	XL Center (16,294); Hartford, CT
March 6, 2014; 7:00 pm, ESPN	No. 15	No. 20 Memphis; Rivalry	W 97–84	25–5 (14–3)	Fifth Third Arena (13,176); Cincinnati, OH
March 8, 2014; 12:00pm, ESPNews	No. 15	at Rutgers	W 70–66	26–5 (15–3)	The RAC (6,650); Pisacataway, NJ
American Athletic Conference tournament
March 13, 2014; 7:00pm, ESPNU	(1) No. 13	vs. (9) UCF; Quarterfinals	W 61–58	27–5	FedEx Forum (13,081); Memphis, TN
March 14, 2014; 9:00pm, ESPN2	(1) No. 13	vs. (4) No. 21 UConn; Semifinals	L 56–58	27–6	FedEx Forum (11,888); Memphis, TN
NCAA tournament
March 20, 2014; 2:10pm, TNT	(5 S) No. 15	vs. (12 S) Harvard; Second Round	L 57–61	27–7	Spokane Arena (10,862); Spokane, WA
*Non-conference game. ^{#}Rankings from AP Poll. (#) Tournament seedings in parentheses. All times are in Eastern Time. (#) during NCAA Tournament is seed within region S=South.

== Awards and milestones ==
=== All-American ===
- Consensus Second Team: Sean Kilpatrick

=== American Athletic Conference honors ===
==== All-AAC Awards ====
- Defensive Player of the Year: Justin Jackson
- Coach of the Year: Mick Cronin
- Sportsmanship Award: Sean Kilpatrick

==== All-AAC First Team ====
- Sean Kilpatrick

==== All-AAC Second Team ====
- Justin Jackson

==== Player of the Week ====
- Week 7: Justin Jackson
- Week 8: Justin Jackson
- Week 9: Justin Jackson
- Week 13: Sean Kilpatrick
- Week 14: Sean Kilpatrick
- Week 18: Sean Kilpatrick

== Rankings ==
Ranking movement Legend: ██ Improvement in ranking. ██ Decrease in ranking. ██ Not ranked the previous week.
Poll	Pre	Wk 2	Wk 3	Wk 4	Wk 5	Wk 6	Wk 7	Wk 8	Wk 9	Wk 10	Wk 11	Wk 12	Wk 13	Wk 14	Wk 15	Wk 16	WK 17	Wk 18	Wk 19	Wk 20	Final
AP	RV	RV	RV	RV	RV	RV	NR	NR	NR	RV	19	15	13	7	10	7	11	15	13	15	N/A
Coaches	NR	NR	NR	NR	NR	NR	NR	NR	NR	RV	23	16	15	7	11	9	12	15	13	14	22
