= Bob Hoffman (basketball) =

American college basketball coach (born 1957)

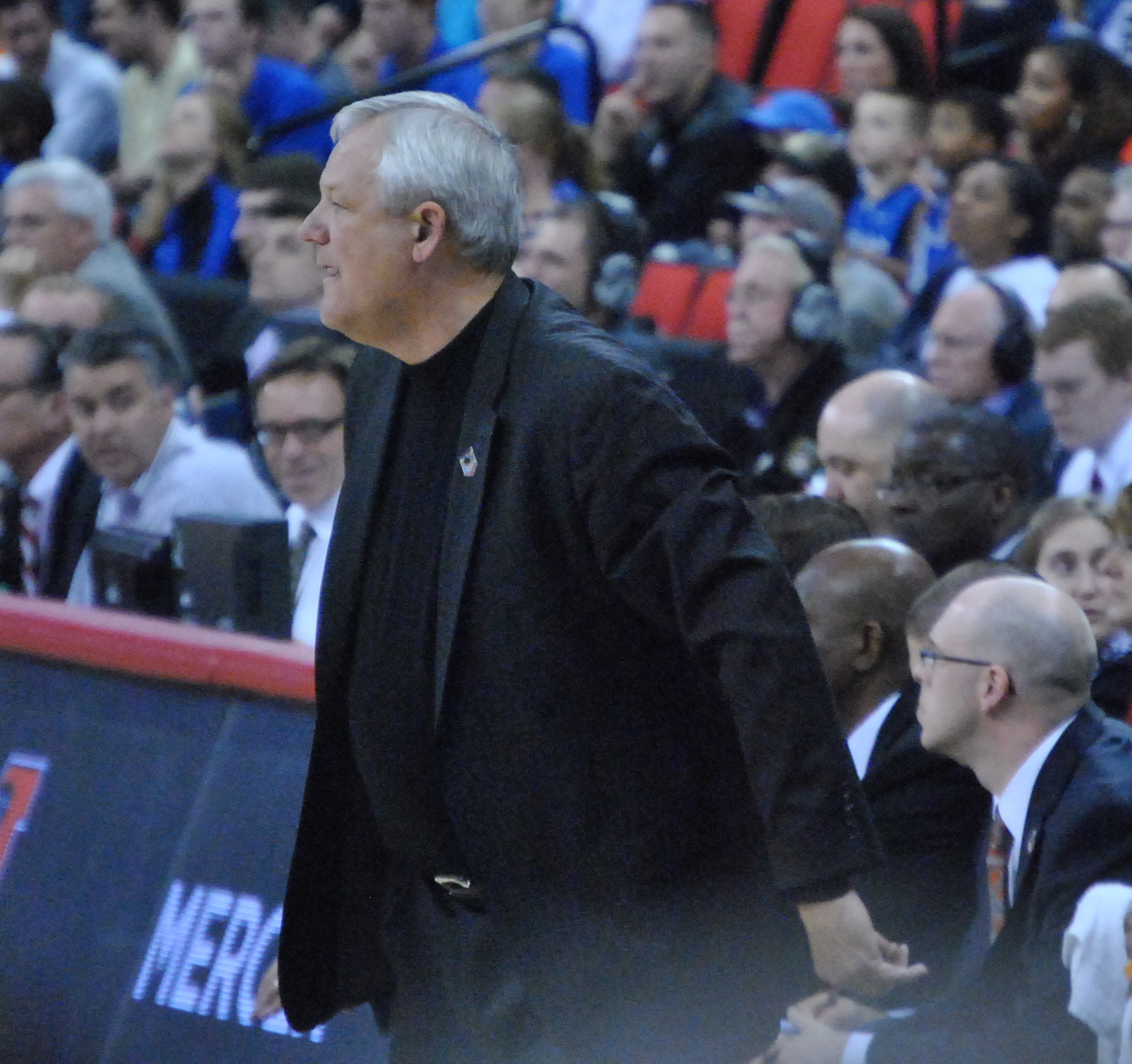

Current position
- Title: Head coach
- Team: Central Oklahoma
- Conference: The MIAA
- Record: 113–69

Biographical details
- Born: July 18, 1957 (age 69); Oklahoma City, Oklahoma, U.S.
- Education: Oklahoma Baptist University

Playing career
- 1975–1979: Oklahoma Baptist
- Position: Guard / forward

Coaching career (HC unless noted)
- 1981–1985: Piedmont High School
- 1987–1990: Southern Nazarene (women)
- 1990–1999: Oklahoma Baptist
- 1999–2004: Texas-Pan American
- 2004–2006: Oklahoma (asst.)
- 2006–2007: Arkansas Aeros
- 2007–2008: Rio Grande Valley Vipers
- 2008–2019: Mercer
- 2019–present: Central Oklahoma

Head coaching record
- Overall: 633–386 (.621) (men's); 88–16 (.846) (women's)

Accomplishments and honors

Championships
- NAIA women's national championship (1989); CIT (2012); 2× Atlantic Sun regular season (2013, 2014); Atlantic Sun tournament (2014); MIAA regular season (2022); MIAA tournament (2022)

Awards
- 2x Atlantic Sun Coach of the Year (2013, 2014); MIAA Coach of the Year (2022)

Bob Hoffman (born July 18, 1957) is an American college basketball coach who is currently the head coach at the University of Central Oklahoma.

== Early life ==
He is a graduate of Putnam City High School in Warr Acres, Oklahoma and went to Oklahoma Baptist University in Shawnee to play basketball. He met his wife there and after graduation he was hired at Piedmont High School in Piedmont, Oklahoma just northwest of Oklahoma City.

== Coaching career ==
He was hired as the head women's basketball coach at Southern Nazarene University, where his team won the NAIA national championship in 1989. From there he returned to his alma mater as men's coach for the following ten years.

From OBU he was the coach at University of Texas-Pan American then back to Oklahoma where he served as an assistant to Kelvin Sampson at the University of Oklahoma until Sampson was found to have committed numerous NCAA violations. After an investigation of the entire coaching staff, Hoffman was cleared by the NCAA of any wrongdoing, and parted ways with the program. Prior to his role at Mercer University, Hoffman went on to coach in the American Basketball League and the NBA Development League. He was hired on March 27, 2008 to replace Mark Slonaker. He led Mercer to the 2012 CollegeInsider.com Tournament championship as well as the university's first NCAA Tournament victory in an upset of No. 6 Duke on March 21, 2014.

Hoffman won his 400th game as a men's college coach when Mercer defeated Lipscomb University on January 26, 2013. With the victory, Hoffman was 488–239 as a men's and women's college coach. In addition, he previously served as head coach of the Arkansas Aeros in the American Basketball Association and of the Rio Grande Valley Vipers in the NBA Development League Hoffman was the first coach in NCAA Division I Men's basketball history to post a victory in each of the collegiate post season basketball tournaments. He later coached at Mercer University in Macon, Georgia from 2008 to 2019.

Hoffman ended his tenure at Mercer with a record of 209–165 (.572).

== Head coaching record ==
=== Women's ===
Record table
Season	Team	Overall	Conference	Standing	Postseason
Southern Nazarene Crimson Storm (Sooner Athletic Conference) (1987–1990)
1987–88	Southern Nazarene	21–11			
1988–89	Southern Nazarene	36–2			NAIA National Champions
1989–90	Southern Nazarene	31–3	1st		
Southern Nazarene:		88–16 (.846)			
Total:		88–16 (.846)			
National champion Postseason invitational champion Conference regular season champion Conference regular season and conference tournament champion Division regular season champion Division regular season and conference tournament champion Conference tournament champion

=== Men's ===
Record table
Season	Team	Overall	Conference	Standing	Postseason
Oklahoma Baptist Bison (Sooner Athletic Conference) (1990–1999)
1990–91	Oklahoma Baptist	15–17			
1991–92	Oklahoma Baptist	16–17			
1992–93	Oklahoma Baptist	34–4			NAIA Division I Runner-up
1993–94	Oklahoma Baptist	30–7			NAIA Division I Semifinals
1994–95	Oklahoma Baptist	28–6			NAIA Division I First Round
1995–96	Oklahoma Baptist	29–7			NAIA Division I Second Round
1996–97	Oklahoma Baptist	36–4			NAIA Division I Runner-up
1997–98	Oklahoma Baptist	24–9			
1998–99	Oklahoma Baptist	31–7			NAIA Division I Elite Eight
Oklahoma Baptist:		243–78 (.757)			
Texas–Pan American Broncs (Independent) (1999–2004)
1999–00	Texas-Pan American	12–16			
2000–01	Texas-Pan American	12–17			
2001–02	Texas-Pan American	20–10			
2002–03	Texas-Pan American	10–20			
2003–04	Texas-Pan American	14–14			
Texas-Pan American:		68–77 (.469)			
Mercer Bears (Atlantic Sun Conference) (2008–2014)
2008–09	Mercer	17–15	11–9	5th	
2009–10	Mercer	16–17	10–10	6th	
2010–11	Mercer	15–18	11–9	5th	
2011–12	Mercer	27–11	13–5	2nd	CIT Champions
2012–13	Mercer	24–12	14–4	1st	NIT Second Round
2013–14	Mercer	27–9	14–4	T–1st	NCAA Division I Round of 32
Mercer Bears (Southern Conference) (2014–2019)
2014–15	Mercer	19–16	12–6	3rd	CBI Quarterfinals
2015–16	Mercer	19–15	8–10	7th	CIT First Round
2016–17	Mercer	15–17	9–9	6th	
2017–18	Mercer	19–15	11–7	T–4th	CBI Quarterfinals
2018–19	Mercer	11–20	6–12	6th	
Mercer:		209–165 (.559)	119–85 (.583)		
Central Oklahoma Bronchos (MIAA) (2019–present)
2019–20	Central Oklahoma	11–18	8–11	8th	
2020–21	Central Oklahoma	13–11	12–10	5th	
2021–22	Central Oklahoma	24–7	18–4	T–1st	NCAA Division II First Round
2022–23	Central Oklahoma	26–6	18–4	2nd	NCAA Division II First Round
2023–24	Central Oklahoma	20–11	12–10	T–5th	
2024–25	Central Oklahoma	19–13	10–9	T–5th	
Central Oklahoma:		113–69 (.621)	78–48 (.619)		
Total:		633–386 (.621)			
National champion Postseason invitational champion Conference regular season champion Conference regular season and conference tournament champion Division regular season champion Division regular season and conference tournament champion Conference tournament champion

== Personal life ==
Hoffman is a Christian. Hoffman and Mercer President William D. Underwood are both graduates of Oklahoma Baptist University.
