= Allen Arena =

Indoor arena in Nashville, Tennessee, US

- The Arena
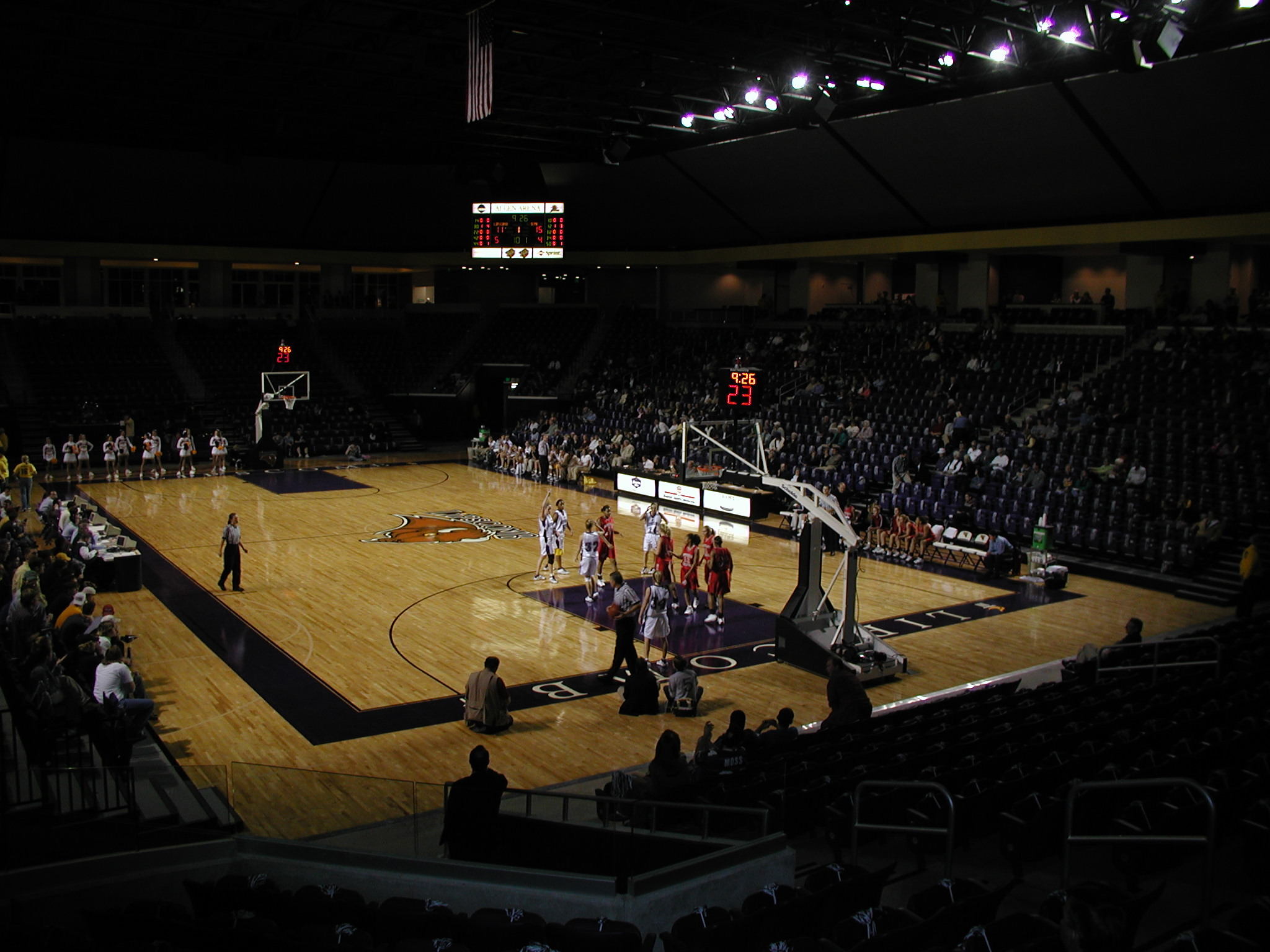
- Interactive map of Allen Arena
- Location: One University Park Drive; Nashville, Tennessee, United States
- Coordinates: 36°6′13.80″N 86°47′55.81″W
- Owner: Lipscomb University
- Operator: Lipscomb University
- Capacity: 5,028 (Basketball); 3,845-5,584 (Concerts)
- Surface: Hardwood court

Construction
- Groundbreaking: September 2000
- Opened: October 28, 2001
- Cost: $16.5 million ($30 million in 2025 dollars)
- Architect: Tuck-Hinton Architects
- Structural engineers: Devine deFlon Yaeger, Inc.
- Services engineer: Lee Company
- General contractor: D.F. Chase Inc.

Tenants
- Lipscomb Bisons (NCAA) (2001–present); Nashville Rhythm (ABA) (2004–2005); Music City Stars (ABA) (2009–2010)

Allen Arena is an indoor arena at Lipscomb University in Nashville, Tennessee. The arena was named in honor of James C. and Linda Allen, the facility's primary benefactors. James Allen is a member of the board of trustees for the university and worked for the university at one time. The arena is primarily used for basketball and volleyball athletic events and is also used for daily chapel services and occasional concerts.

== Facilities ==
Other than hosting athletic events and on campus convocations, the arena hosts many events such as dinners, concerts, area-wide worship services, and graduations (the university and Nashville surrounding high schools). The facility has been host to events such as the annual Minnie Pearl Cancer Foundation Concert, bringing entertainers such as former Vibe host Sinbad, Dana Carvey, and Jay Leno.

Besides being the home of Lipscomb sports teams, it served as the home of the now-defunct Nashville franchise, the Nashville Rhythm, in the revived American Basketball Association. It was also the home of the Music City Stars, an American Basketball Association team during the 2009–10 season.

== History ==
The Allen Arena opened on October 28, 2001, with a local worship service called "In His Hands". The Arena and adjacent parking garage was the site for the school's old McQuiddy Gym name after J.C. McQuiddy Part of the McQuiddy Gym was retained along with the adjacent Student Activities Center (SAC). Yearwood Hall, a women's dormitory, was torn down for construction of the arena.

In the first Lipscomb Bisons home game at Allen Arena, Bison Clayton Osborne made an inbounds shot from three-quarters of the court away. With no time remaining, the ball fell through the net, giving the Bisons a 78–77 victory over the North Texas Mean Green.

The arena hosted the 2008, 2009, 2019 and 2025 Atlantic Sun Conference men's basketball tournaments.

Due to the damage incurred to the Grand Ole Opry House during the May 2010 Tennessee floods and because the Ryman Auditorium was unavailable, Allen Arena hosted the June 5 and June 15, 2010, editions of the Grand Ole Opry. In October 2013, the arena held the nationally televised 44th GMA Dove Awards.

== Capacity ==
Arena seating capacity is between 4,000 and 5,000 depending upon the purpose for which it is being used, and is officially given as 5,028, which is the capacity in the format typically utilized.

== See also ==
- List of NCAA Division I basketball arenas
