= UNF Arena =

Multi-purpose arena in Jacksonville, Florida

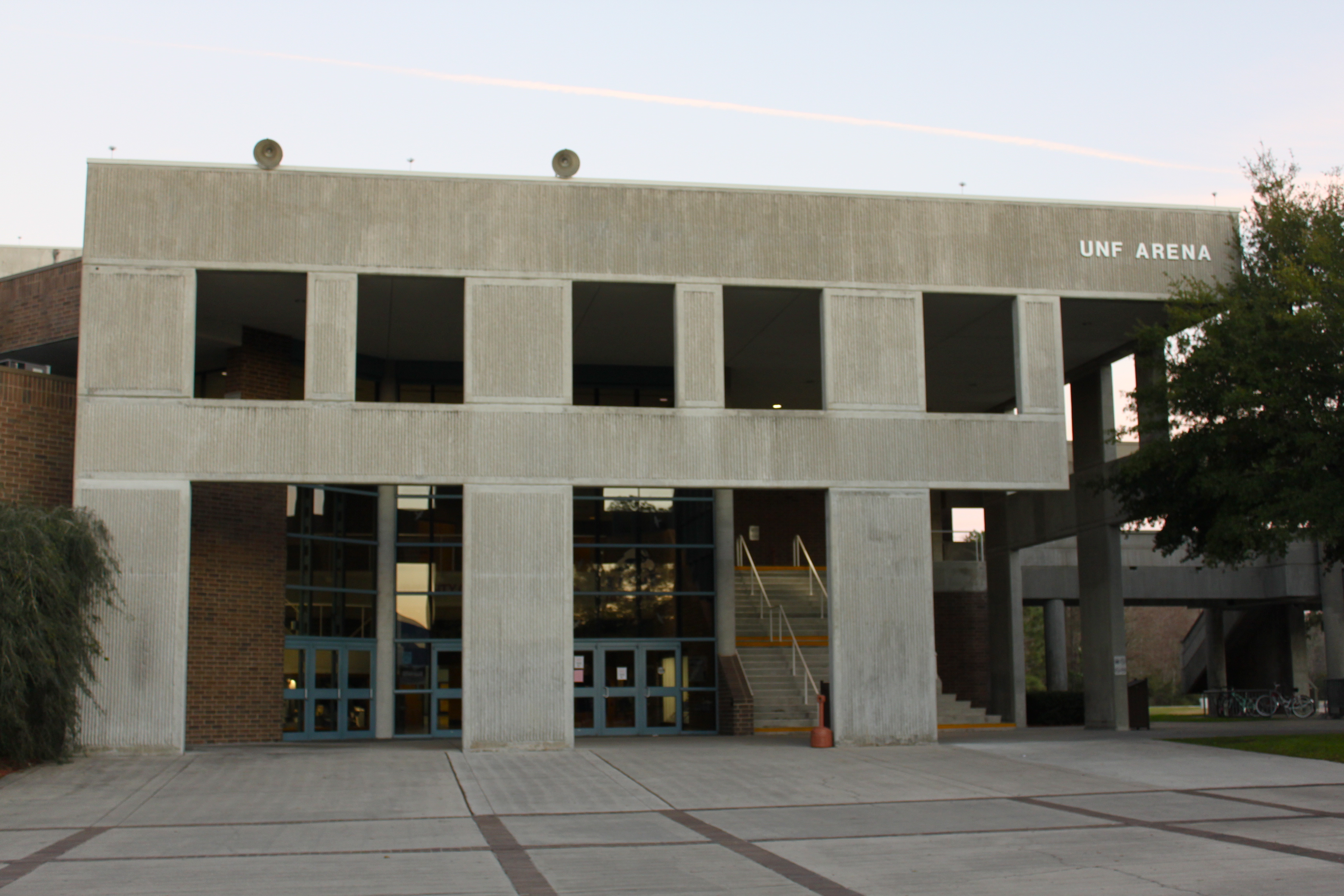
- Interactive map of UNF Arena
- Location: 11852 University of North Florida Drive; Jacksonville, Florida 32224
- Coordinates: 30.2734°N 81.5079°W
- Owner: University of North Florida
- Operator: University of North Florida
- Capacity: 6,300 (Graduation/Concerts); 5,800 (Basketball)
- Surface: Hardwood
- Record attendance: 6,155

Construction
- Groundbreaking: September 23, 1991
- Opened: January 16, 1993
- Cost: $9.2 million ($20.5 million in 2025 dollars)

Tenants
- North Florida Ospreys: Men's and Women's Basketball, Women's Volleyball

UNF Arena is a multi-purpose arena located on the campus of the University of North Florida in Jacksonville, Florida. It is home to the North Florida Ospreys men's and women's basketball and women's volleyball teams. It is also used for other events, such as concerts and graduation ceremonies, and has served as the site of the Orlando Magic franchise's training camp. It opened in 1993 and has a capacity of up to 6,300.

In 2004 the Arena was used by the U.S. Men's and Women's Olympic teams. On September 2, 2008, the university announced plans for UNF Varsity Village. Upgrades will be on the existing locker rooms, athletics offices, scoreboard, and seating. Planned additions will include a video room, academic support area, and a hall of fame/recruiting lounge.

On March 8, 2015, the UNF Arena attendance record was set as 6,155 fans watched North Florida defeat USC Upstate in the 2015 Atlantic Sun men's basketball tournament championship game. In the first round of the 2016 National Invitation Tournament, 6,011 fans saw the Ospreys fall to Florida, 97–68.

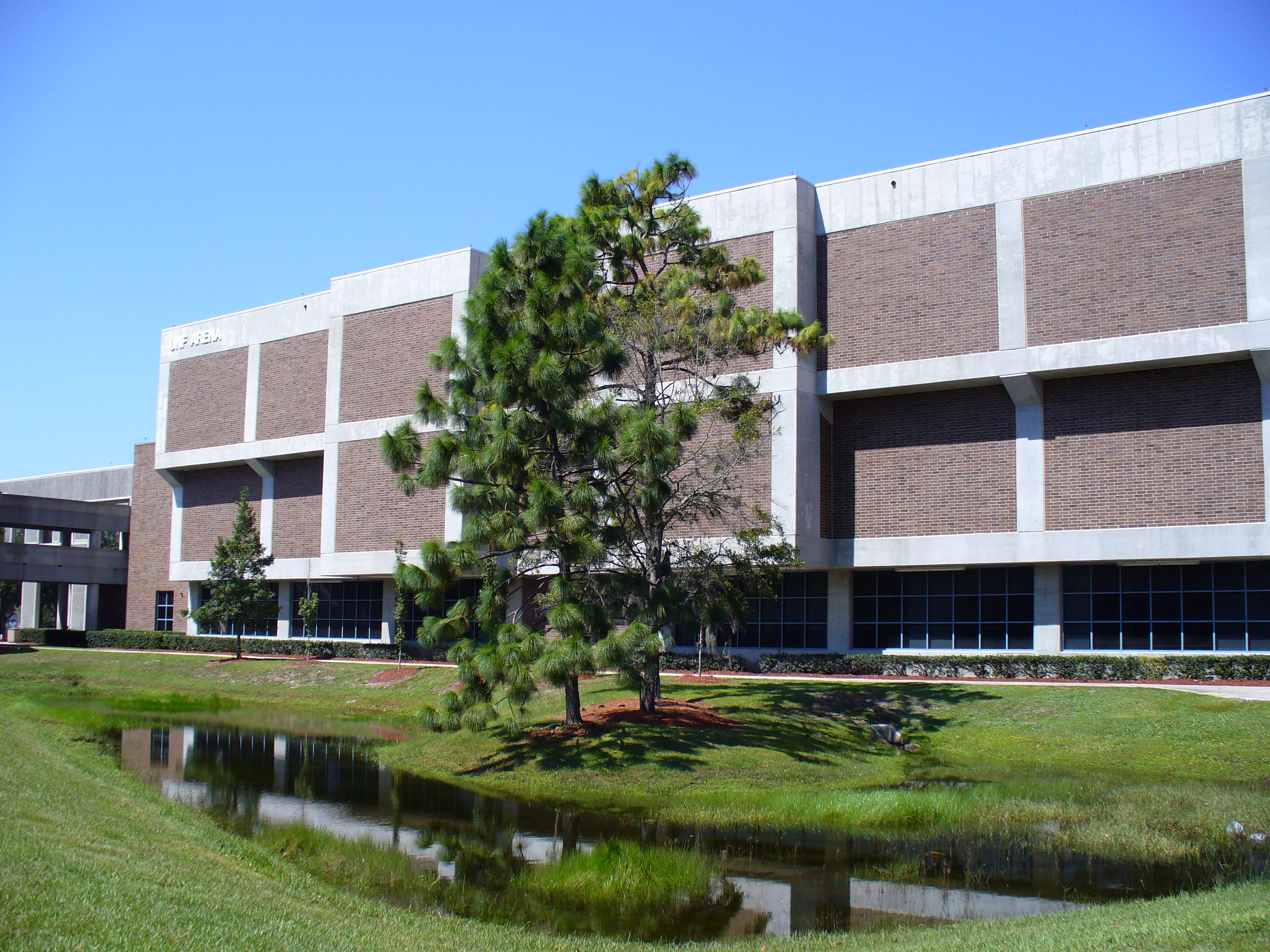
UNF Arena from the outside

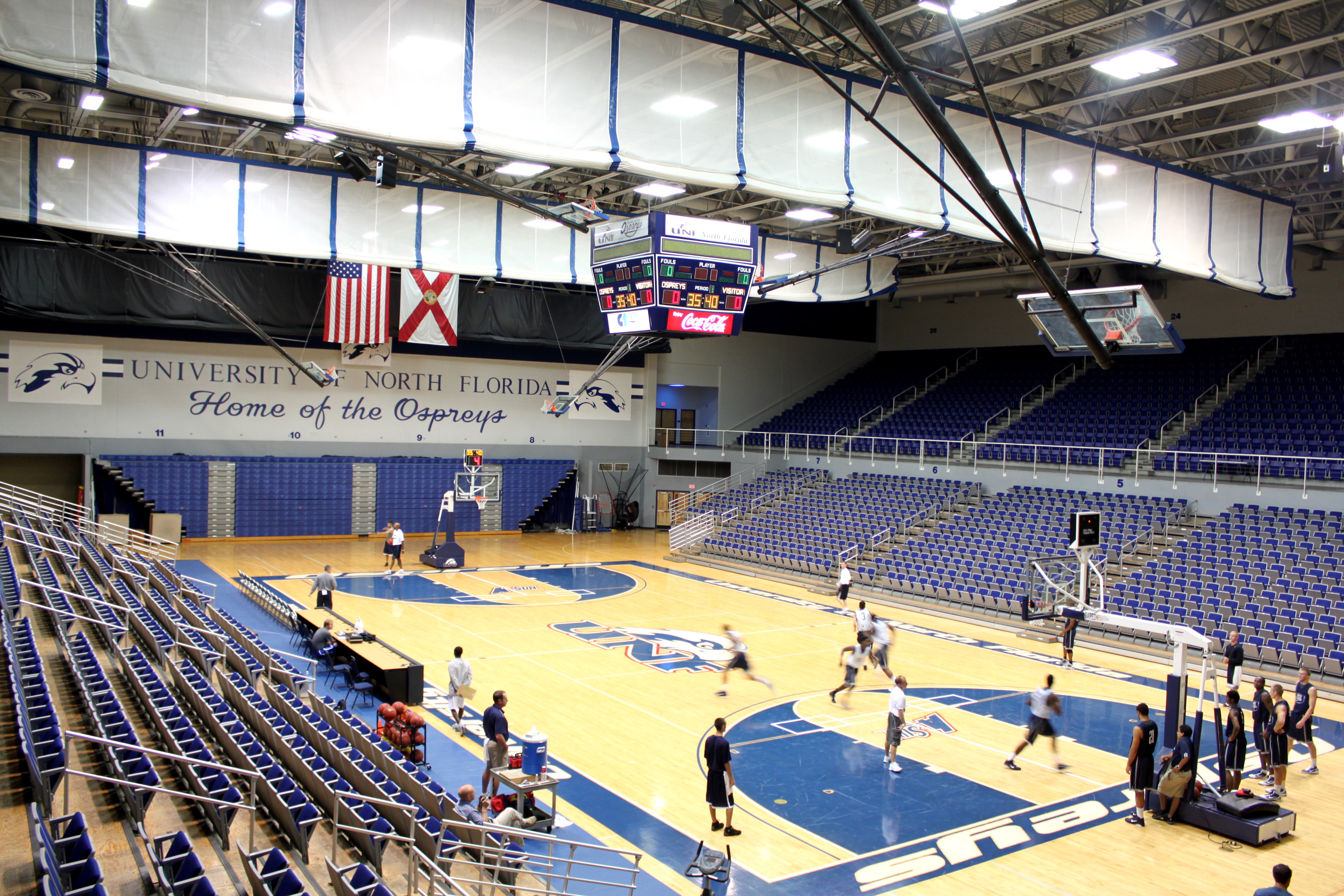
UNF Arena during men's basketball practice

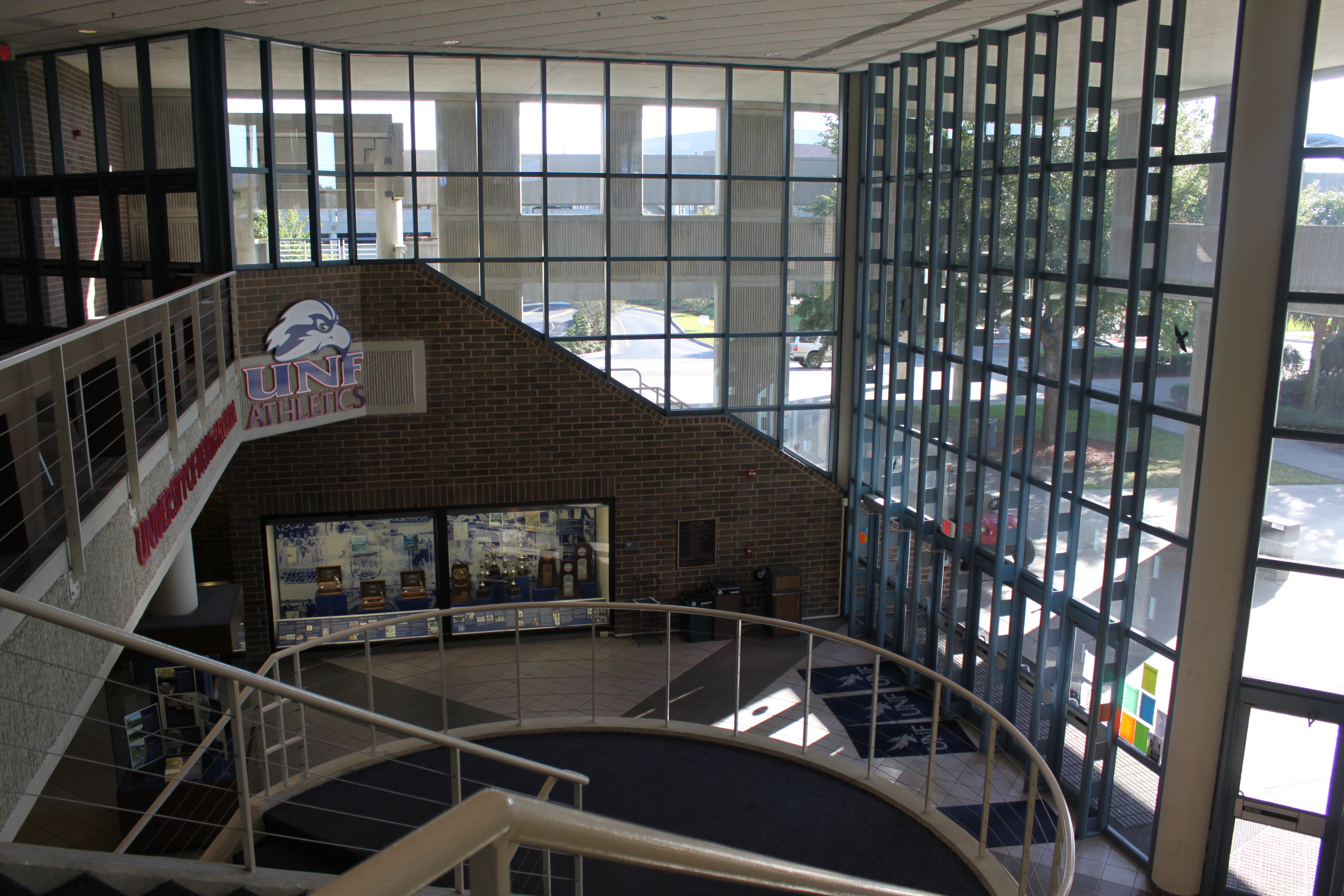
UNF Arena lobby

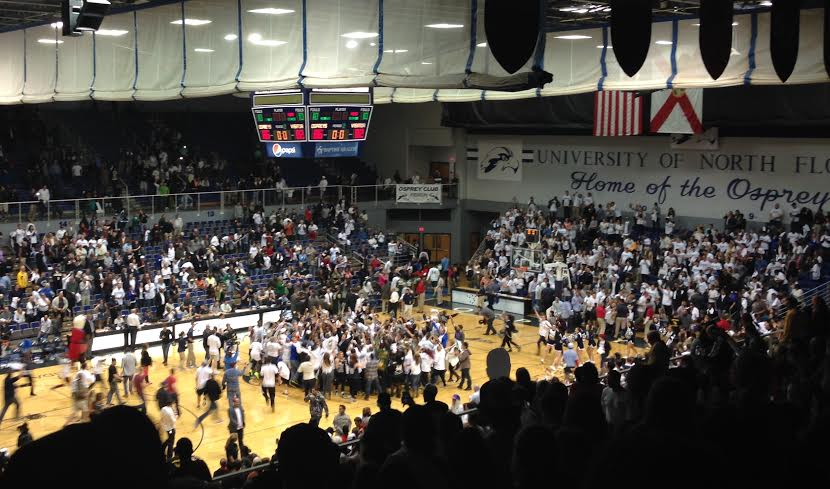
Fans storm the court after UNF defeated rival JU in 2014

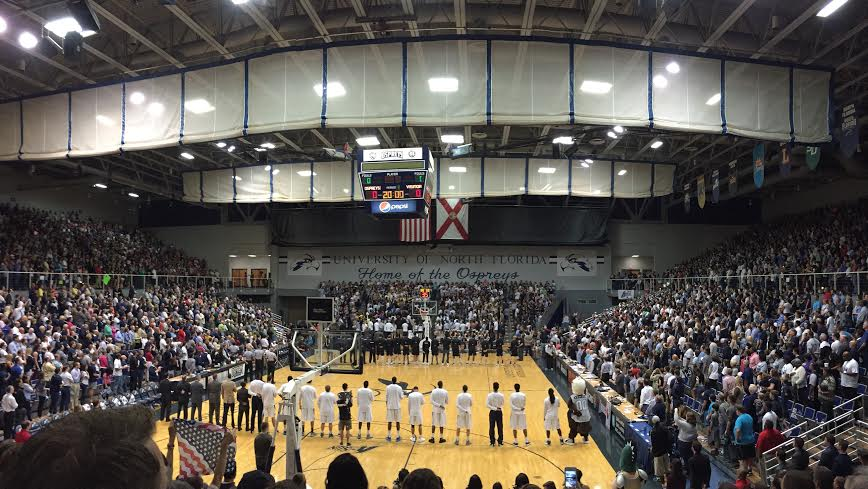
A record crowd watched UNF win the 2015 A-Sun Tournament title

UNF Arena underwent renovations in 2015, including a new center-hung video board

== See also ==
- List of NCAA Division I basketball arenas
