= 2013–14 Rhode Island Rams men's basketball team =

American college basketball season

2013–14 Rhode Island Rams men's basketball
- Conference: Atlantic 10 Conference
- Record: 14–18 (5–11 A-10)
- Head coach: Dan Hurley (2nd season)
- Assistant coaches: Luke Murray; Preston Murphy; Jim Carr
- Home arena: Ryan Center

2013–14 Atlantic 10 men's basketball standings
	Conf.				Overall
Team	W		L	PCT	W		L	PCT
No. 25 Saint Louis	13	–	3	.813	27	–	7	.794
No. 24 VCU	12	–	4	.750	26	–	9	.743
George Washington	11	–	5	.688	24	–	9	.727
Saint Joseph's †	11	–	5	.688	24	–	10	.706
UMass	10	–	6	.625	24	–	9	.727
Dayton	10	–	6	.625	26	–	11	.703
Richmond	8	–	8	.500	19	–	14	.576
La Salle	7	–	9	.438	15	–	16	.484
St. Bonaventure	6	–	10	.375	18	–	15	.545
Rhode Island	5	–	11	.313	14	–	18	.438
Duquesne	5	–	11	.313	13	–	17	.433
George Mason	4	–	12	.250	11	–	20	.355
Fordham	2	–	14	.125	10	–	21	.323
† 2014 A10 Tournament winner Rankings from AP poll

The 2013–14 Rhode Island Rams basketball team represented the University of Rhode Island during the 2013–14 NCAA Division I men's basketball season. The Rams, led by second year head coach Dan Hurley, played their home games at the Ryan Center and are members of the Atlantic 10 Conference. They finished the season 14–18, 5–11 in A-10 play to finish in a tie for tenth place. They lost in the second round of the A-10 tournament to Massachusetts.

== Roster ==
Number	Name	Position	Height	Weight	Year	Hometown
0	E. C. Matthews	Guard	6–5	190	Freshman	Romulus, Michigan
1	Mike Powell	Guard	5–11	175	Junior	Chicago, Illinois
2	Jarelle Reischel	Forward	6–6	215	RS Sophomore	Frankfurt, Germany
4	Jordan Hare	Forward	6–10	205	Sophomore	Saginaw, Michigan
5	Xavier Munford	Guard	6–2	180	Senior	Hillside, New Jersey
10	DeShon Minnis	Guard	6–3	185	RS Sophomore	Philadelphia, Pennsylvania
11	Matthew Butler	Guard	6–2	200	Freshman	Memphis, Tennessee
12	Hassan Martin	Forward	6–7	210	Freshman	Staten Island, New York
13	T. J. Buchanan	Guard	6–3	195	Junior	Kalamazoo, Michigan
14	Ifeyani Onyekaba	Forward	6–8	240	Sophomore	Abuja, Nigeria
20	Eric Youncofski	Guard	5–10	150	Sophomore	Middletown Township, New Jersey
22	Jonathan Nazarko	Guard	6–2	200	Senior	East Lyme, Connecticut
30	Shane Plunkett	Guard	6–3	195	Sophomore	Brookville, New York
34	Mike Aaman	Forward	6–8	210	Sophomore	Hazlet, New Jersey
55	Gilvydas Biruta	Forward	6–8	245	RS Junior	Jonava, Lithuania

== Schedule ==
Date time, TV	Opponent	Result	Record	Site (attendance) city, state
Exhibition
11/01/2013*; 7:00 pm	Southern Connecticut	W 93–77		Ryan Center (N/A); Kingston, RI
Regular season
11/08/2013*; 7:00 pm, OSN	Maine	W 97–77	1–0	Ryan Center (5,410); Kingston, RI
11/11/2013*; 8:00 pm, ESPN3	at SMU	L 58–89	1–1	Garland Special Events Center (3,239); Garland, TX
11/15/2013*; 7:00 pm, OSN	North Carolina A&T	W 72–59	2–1	Ryan Center (4,821); Kingston, RI
11/18/2013*; 8:00 pm	vs. Metro State; NIT Season Tip-Off First Round	W 66–63	3–1	McKale Center (N/A); Tucson, AZ
11/19/2013*; 11:00 pm, ESPNU	at No. 5 Arizona; NIT Season Tip-Off Quarterfinals	L 59–87	3–2	McKale Center (13,354); Tucson, AZ
11/23/2013*; 7:00 pm, OSN	UMass Lowell	W 79–68	4–2	Ryan Center (4,342); Kingston, RI
11/25/2013*; 7:30 pm	UNC Asheville; NIT Season Tip-Off consolation round	W 73–56	5–2	Ryan Center (869); Kingston, RI
11/26/2013*; 7:30 pm	NcNeese State; NIT Season Tip-Off consolation round	W 76–71	6–2	Ryan Center (858); Kingston, RI
11/30/2013*; 4:00 pm, OSN	at George Mason	L 54–61	6–3	Patriot Center (4,014); Fairfax, VA
12/05/2013*; 8:00 pm, CBSSN	Providence; Ocean State Cup	L 49–50	6–4	Ryan Center (7,657); Kingston, RI
12/08/2013*; 2:00 pm	at Detroit	L 68–70	6–5	Calihan Hall (2,413); Detroit, MI
12/22/2013*; 2:00 pm, OSN	New Hampshire	W 62–45	7–5	Ryan Center (3,246); Kingston, RI
12/28/2013*; 2:00 pm, OSN	Southern Miss	L 64–77	7–6	Ryan Center (3,462); Kingston, RI
01/02/2014*; 7:00 pm, MyRITV	at Brown; Ocean State Cup	W 75–66	8–6	Pizzitola Sports Center (1,229); Providence, RI
01/04/2014*; 8:00 pm, OSN	at LSU	W 74–70	9–6	Maravich Center (8,789); Baton Rouge, LA
01/07/2014; 7:00 pm, CBSSN	Saint Louis	L 58–59	9–7 (0–1)	Ryan Center (4,510); Kingston, RI
01/11/2014; 2:30 pm, NBCSN	at George Washington	L 56–69	9–8 (0–2)	Smith Center (2,644); Washington, D.C.
01/15/2014; 7:00 pm, OSN	at La Salle	L 62–72	9–9 (0–3)	Tom Gola Arena (2,655); Philadelphia, PA
01/18/2014; 12:30 pm, NBCSN	George Mason	W 71–69 ^{OT}	10–9 (1–3)	Ryan Center (4,810); Kingston, RI
01/22/2014; 7:00 pm, OSN	at Saint Joseph's	L 57–61	10–10 (1–4)	Hagan Arena (3,861); Philadelphia, PA
01/25/2014; 4:00 pm, CBSSN	Dayton	W 88–76	11–10 (2–4)	Ryan Cener (6,211); Kingston, RI
02/01/2014; 7:00 pm, OSN	at Fordham	L 79–85	11–11 (2–5)	Rose Hill Gymnasium (2,851); Bronx, NY
02/06/2014; 7:00 pm, CBSSN	at VCU	L 52–68	11–12 (2–6)	Stuart C. Siegel Center (7,741); Richmond, VA
02/09/2014; 4:00 pm, CBSSN	Massachusetts	L 68–73	11–13 (2–7)	Ryan Center (6,511); Kingston, RI
02/12/2014; 7:00 pm, OSN	at Dayton	L 69–76	11–14 (2–8)	UD Arena (12,255); Dayton, OH
02/15/2014; 12:00 pm, OSN	Duquesne	L 71–83	11–15 (2–9)	Ryan Center (4,112); Kingston, RI
02/19/2014; 7:00 pm, OSN	Saint Joseph's	L 54–57	11–16 (2–10)	Ryan Center (4,712); Kingston, RI
02/22/2014; 4:00 pm	at St. Bonaventure	W 87–78	12–16 (3–10)	Reilly Center (5,405); Olean, NY
02/26/2014; 7:00 pm, OSN	at Massachusetts	L 67–70	12–17 (3–11)	Mullins Center (6,234); Amherst, MA
03/01/2014; 2:00 pm, OSN	Richmond	W 66–43	13–17 (4–11)	Ryan Center (5,113); Kingston, RI
03/05/2014; 7:00 pm, OSN	Fordham	W 77–65	14–17 (5–11)	Ryan Center (4,414); Kingston, RI
Atlantic 10 tournament
03/13/2014; 9:00 pm, CSN	vs. Massachusetts; Second round	L 61–65	14–18	Barclays Center (8,755); Brooklyn, NY
*Non-conference game. ^{#}Rankings from AP Poll. (#) Tournament seedings in parentheses. All times are in Eastern Time.
