= 2013–14 La Salle Explorers men's basketball team =

American college basketball season

2013–14 La Salle Explorers men's basketball
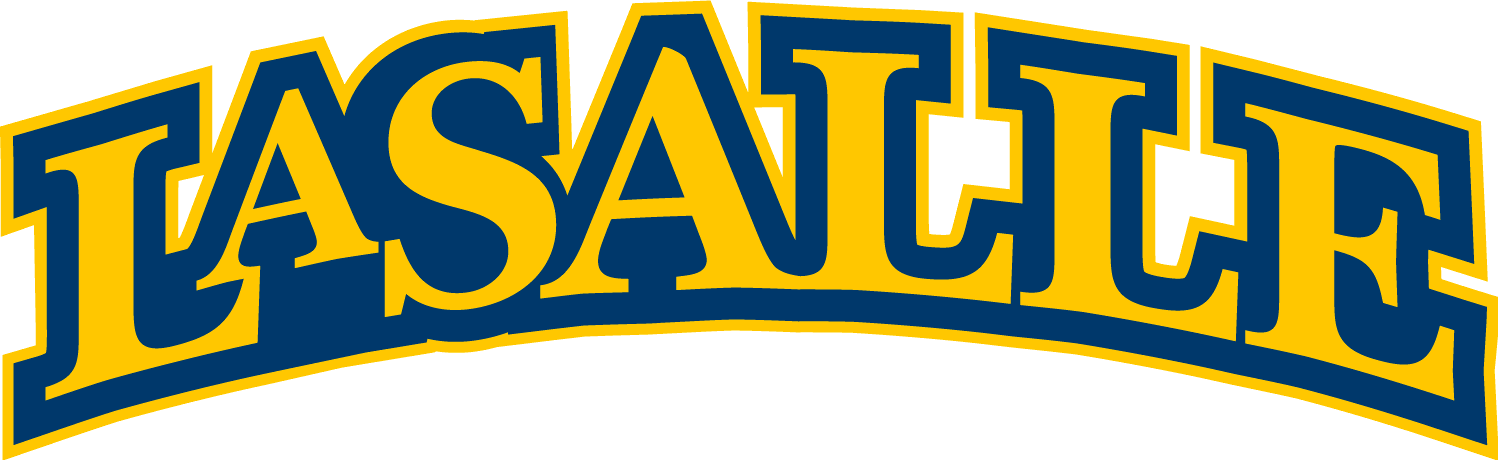
- Conference: Atlantic 10 Conference
- Record: 15–16 (7–9 A-10)
- Head coach: John Giannini (10th season)
- Assistant coaches: Horace Owens; Harris Adler; Will Bailey
- Home arena: Tom Gola Arena

2013–14 Atlantic 10 men's basketball standings
	Conf.				Overall
Team	W		L	PCT	W		L	PCT
No. 25 Saint Louis	13	–	3	.813	27	–	7	.794
No. 24 VCU	12	–	4	.750	26	–	9	.743
George Washington	11	–	5	.688	24	–	9	.727
Saint Joseph's †	11	–	5	.688	24	–	10	.706
UMass	10	–	6	.625	24	–	9	.727
Dayton	10	–	6	.625	26	–	11	.703
Richmond	8	–	8	.500	19	–	14	.576
La Salle	7	–	9	.438	15	–	16	.484
St. Bonaventure	6	–	10	.375	18	–	15	.545
Rhode Island	5	–	11	.313	14	–	18	.438
Duquesne	5	–	11	.313	13	–	17	.433
George Mason	4	–	12	.250	11	–	20	.355
Fordham	2	–	14	.125	10	–	21	.323
† 2014 A10 Tournament winner Rankings from AP poll

The 2013–14 La Salle Explorers basketball team represented La Salle University during the 2013–14 NCAA Division I men's basketball season. The Explorers, led by tenth year head coach John Giannini, played their home games at Tom Gola Arena and were members of the Atlantic 10 Conference. They finished the season 15–16, 7–9 in A-10 play to finish in eighth place. They lost in the second round of the A-10 tournament to St. Bonaventure.

== Roster ==
2013–14 La Salle Explorers men's basketball team
Players
Coaches

Pos.	#	Name	Height	Weight	Year	Hometown
C	0	Stephen Zack	6 ft 11 in (2.11 m)	245 lb (111 kg)	Jr	New Cumberland, PA
G	1	D.J. Peterson	6 ft 5 in (1.96 m)	190 lb (86 kg)	Jr	Burnsville, MN
G	2	Amar Stukes	6 ft 2 in (1.88 m)	180 lb (82 kg)	Fr	Philadelphia, PA
G	3	Tyreek Duren	6 ft 0 in (1.83 m)	190 lb (86 kg)	Sr	Philadelphia, PA
G	4	Hank Davis (W)	5 ft 10 in (1.78 m)	155 lb (70 kg)	Fr	Cherry Hill, NJ
G	5	Taylor Dunn	6 ft 2 in (1.88 m)	205 lb (93 kg)	RS Sr	State College, PA
G	10	Sam Mills	6 ft 2 in (1.88 m)	200 lb (91 kg)	Sr	Sunrise, FL
G	11	O.J. Lewis	6 ft 0 in (1.83 m)	170 lb (77 kg)	So	Mitchellville, MD
G	21	Tyrone Garland	6 ft 1 in (1.85 m)	185 lb (84 kg)	Sr	Philadelphia, PA
G	23	Khalid Lewis	6 ft 3 in (1.91 m)	195 lb (88 kg)	RS So	Trenton, NJ
F	25	Jerrell Wright	6 ft 8 in (2.03 m)	255 lb (116 kg)	Jr	Philadelphia, PA
C	30	Jermaine Davis	6 ft 9 in (2.06 m)	280 lb (127 kg)	RS Fr	Garfield Heights, OH
G/F	35	Rohan Brown	6 ft 6 in (1.98 m)	225 lb (102 kg)	RS So	Hartford, CT
G		Jordan Price	6 ft 5 in (1.96 m)	230 lb (104 kg)	So	Decatur, GA
G		Cleon Roberts	6 ft 5 in (1.96 m)	180 lb (82 kg)	So	Miami, FL

Head coach

- John Giannini (North Central (IL))

Assistant coach(es)

- Horace Owens (Rhode Island)
- Harris Adler (USciences)
- Will Bailey (UAB)

Legend

- (C) Team captain
- (S) Suspended
- (I) Ineligible
- (W) Walk-on
- Injured
- Current redshirt

== Schedule ==
Date time, TV	Opponent	Result	Record	Site (attendance) city, state
Exhibition
11/02/2013*; 2:00 pm	IUP	W 87–57		Tom Gola Arena (N/A); Philadelphia, PA
Regular season
11/09/2013*; 2:00 pm	Manhattan	L 90–99 ^{OT}	0–1	Tom Gola Arena (3,400); Philadelphia, PA
11/12/2013*; 9:00 am, ESPN2	Quinnipiac; ESPN Tip-Off Marathon	W 73–67	1–1	Tom Gola Arena (3,229); Philadelphia, PA
11/16/2013*; 3:00 pm	Siena	W 78–74	2–1	Tom Gola Arena (3,400); Philadelphia, PA
11/19/2013*; 7:00 pm, ESPN3	at Penn State	L 72–79	2–2	Bryce Jordan Center (4,240); University Park, PA
11/22/2013*; 9:00 pm	vs. Morgan State; Paradise Jam tournament 1st Round	W 78–59	3–2	Sports and Fitness Center (2,275); Saint Thomas, VI
11/24/2013*; 9:30 pm, CBSSN	vs. Providence; Paradise Jam Tournament semifinals	L 63–71	3–3	Sports and Fitness Center (1,766); Saint Thomas, VI
11/25/2013*; 7:30 pm, CBSSN	vs. Northern Iowa; Paradise Jam Tournament 3rd place game	L 50–65	3–4	Sports and Fitness Center (N/A); Saint Thomas, VI
12/04/2013*; 7:00 pm	Hartford	W 75–62	4–4	Tom Gola Arena (1,611); Philadelphia, PA
12/07/2013*; 11:00 am, CSNPHI	vs. Stony Brook; Madison Square Garden Holiday Festival	W 65–57	5–4	Madison Square Garden (N/A); New York City, NY
12/15/2013*; 2:30 pm, FS1	at No. 10 Villanova	L 52–73	5–5	The Pavilion (6,500); Villanova, PA
12/19/2013*; 7:00 pm	Wagner	W 80–54	6–5	Tom Gola Arena (1,391); Philadelphia, PA
12/22/2013*; 7:00 pm, ESPN3	at Miami (FL)	L 58–71	6–6	BankUnited Center (4,837); Coral Gables, FL
01/04/2014*; 7:00 pm	at Penn	W 76–57	7–6	Palestra (3,956); Philadelphia, PA
01/09/2014; 8:00 pm, NBCSN	George Washington	W 76–72	8–6 (1–0)	Tom Gola Arena (1,930); Philadelphia, PA
01/12/2014; 2:30 pm, NBCSN	at Duquesne	W 75–56	9–6 (2–0)	A. J. Palumbo Center (3,740); Pittsburgh, PA
01/15/2014; 7:00 pm	Rhode Island	W 72–62	10–6 (3–0)	Tom Gola Arena (2,655); Pittsburgh, PA
01/18/2014*; 12:00 pm, ESPN2	vs. Temple; ESPN College GameDay	W 74–68	11–6	Palestra (8,722); Philadelphia, PA
01/22/2014; 9:00 pm, CBSSN	at St. Bonaventure	L 51–66	11–7 (3–1)	Reilly Center (3,253); Olean, NY
01/25/2014; 12:00 pm, ESPN2	VCU	L 87–97 ^{2OT}	11–8 (3–2)	Tom Gola Arena (3,400); Philadelphia, PA
01/29/2014; 7:00 pm, TCN	at George Washington	L 47–69	11–9 (3–3)	Smith Center (3,611); Washington, D.C.
02/01/2014; 4:00 pm, TCN	Duquesne	W 71–63	12–9 (4–3)	Tom Gola Arena (2,515); Pittsburgh, PA
02/05/2014; 7:00 pm, CBSSN	at Massachusetts	L 67–79	12–10 (4–4)	Mullins Center (4,345); Amherst, MA
02/08/2014; 5:00 pm, ESPN2	No. 13 Saint Louis	L 63–65	12–11 (4–5)	Tom Gola Arena (3,400); Philadelphia, PA
02/15/2014; 11:00 am, ESPNU	Saint Joseph's	L 64–75	12–12 (4–6)	Tom Gola Arena (3,041); Philadelphia, PA
02/19/2014; 9:00 pm, CBSSN	at Dayton	L 53–65	12–13 (4–7)	UD Arena (12,380); Dayton, OH
02/22/2014; 4:00 pm, CBSSN	at Richmond	L 49–62	12–14 (4–8)	Robins Center (7,201); Richmond, VA
02/26/2014; 7:00 pm	St. Bonaventure	W 75–67	13–14 (5–8)	Tom Gola Arena (1,631); Philadelphia, PA
03/01/2014; 5:00 pm, NBCSN	at Fordham	W 64–62	14–14 (6–8)	Rose Hill Gymnasium (3,017); The Bronx, NY
03/06/2014; 8:00 pm, NBCSN	George Mason	L 57–59	14–15 (6–9)	Tom Gola Arena (1,503); Philadelphia, PA
03/09/2014; 4:00 pm, CBSSN	at Saint Joseph's	W 71–63	15–15 (7–9)	Hagan Arena (4,200); Philadelphia, PA
Atlantic 10 tournament
03/13/2014; 12:00 pm, CSN	vs. St. Bonaventure; Second round	L 72–82	15–16	Barclays Center (6,823); Brooklyn, NY
*Non-conference game. ^{#}Rankings from AP Poll. (#) Tournament seedings in parentheses. All times are in Eastern Time.
