= 2013–14 Richmond Spiders men's basketball team =

American college basketball season

2013–14 Richmond Spiders men's basketball
- Conference: Atlantic 10 Conference
- Record: 19–14 (8–8 A-10)
- Head coach: Chris Mooney (9th season)
- Assistant coaches: Jamal Brunt (7th season); Rob Jones (6th season); Kim Lewis (1st season)
- Home arena: Robins Center

2013–14 Atlantic 10 men's basketball standings
	Conf.				Overall
Team	W		L	PCT	W		L	PCT
No. 25 Saint Louis	13	–	3	.813	27	–	7	.794
No. 24 VCU	12	–	4	.750	26	–	9	.743
George Washington	11	–	5	.688	24	–	9	.727
Saint Joseph's †	11	–	5	.688	24	–	10	.706
UMass	10	–	6	.625	24	–	9	.727
Dayton	10	–	6	.625	26	–	11	.703
Richmond	8	–	8	.500	19	–	14	.576
La Salle	7	–	9	.438	15	–	16	.484
St. Bonaventure	6	–	10	.375	18	–	15	.545
Rhode Island	5	–	11	.313	14	–	18	.438
Duquesne	5	–	11	.313	13	–	17	.433
George Mason	4	–	12	.250	11	–	20	.355
Fordham	2	–	14	.125	10	–	21	.323
† 2014 A10 Tournament winner Rankings from AP poll

The 2013–14 Richmond Spiders men's basketball team represented the University of Richmond during the 2013–14 NCAA Division I men's basketball season. Richmond competed as a member of the Atlantic 10 Conference (A-10) under ninth-year head coach Chris Mooney and played its home games at the Robins Center. They finished the season 19–14, 8–8 in A-10 play to finish in seventh place. They advanced to the quarterfinals of the A-10 tournament where they lost to VCU. Despite having 19 wins, they did not participate in a post season tournament.

== Preseason ==
=== Recruiting ===
College recruiting information
Name	Hometown	School	Height	Weight	Commit date
Josh Jones; SG	Memphis, Tennessee	Central HS	6 ft 4 in (1.93 m)	185 lb (84 kg)	Oct 2, 2012
Josh Jones; SG	Recruit ratings: (72)				
ShawnDre' Jones; PG	Houston, Texas	Bush HS	5 ft 10 in (1.78 m)	155 lb (70 kg)	Oct 6, 2012
ShawnDre' Jones; PG	Recruit ratings: Scout: Rivals: (70)				
Tim Singleton; SG	Dallas, Texas	Hillcrest HS	6 ft 2 in (1.88 m)	180 lb (82 kg)	Oct 15, 2012
Tim Singleton; SG	Recruit ratings: Rivals: (70)				
Overall recruit ranking: Scout: NR Rivals: NR ESPN: NR
Note: In many cases, Scout, Rivals, 247Sports, On3, and ESPN may conflict in their listings of height and weight.; In these cases, the average was taken. ESPN grades are on a 100-point scale.; Sources: "Rivals.com 2013 Richmond Commitments". Rivals.; "Scout.com 2013 Richmond Commitments". Scout.; "ESPN 2013 Richmond Commitments". ESPN.; "Scout.com Team Recruiting Rankings". Scout.; "2013 Team Ranking". Rivals.

== Roster ==
2013–14 Richmond Spiders men's basketball team
Players
Coaches

Pos.	#	Name	Height	Weight	Year	Hometown
G	0	Kendall Anthony	5 ft 8 in (1.73 m)	140 lb (64 kg)	Jr	Jackson, Tennessee
G	1	Josh Jones	6 ft 4 in (1.93 m)	185 lb (84 kg)	Fr	Memphis, Tennessee
G	2	Cedrick Lindsay (injured)	6 ft 1 in (1.85 m)	190 lb (86 kg)	Sr	Washington, D.C.
G	3	ShawnDre' Jones	5 ft 10 in (1.78 m)	155 lb (70 kg)	Fr	Houston, Texas
G	4	Wayne Sparrow	6 ft 3 in (1.91 m)	180 lb (82 kg)	RS Jr	Baltimore, Maryland
F	5	Trey Davis	6 ft 5 in (1.96 m)	200 lb (91 kg)	RS So	Richmond, Virginia
G	10	Tim Singleton	6 ft 2 in (1.88 m)	180 lb (82 kg)	Fr	Dallas, Texas
F	11	Deion Taylor	6 ft 7 in (2.01 m)	200 lb (91 kg)	So	New Orleans, Louisiana
F	12	Chase Fletcher	6 ft 6 in (1.98 m)	205 lb (93 kg)	Fr	Dallas, Texas
G	13	John Moran	6 ft 3 in (1.91 m)	175 lb (79 kg)	So	Phoenixville, Pennsylvania
F	15	Terry Allen	6 ft 8 in (2.03 m)	235 lb (107 kg)	So	Houston, Texas
G	30	Zach Chu	5 ft 8 in (1.73 m)	160 lb (73 kg)	Jr	Dallas, Texas
F	32	T. J. Cline (redshirt)	6 ft 8 in (2.03 m)	240 lb (109 kg)	So	Plano, Texas
F	33	Alonzo Nelson-Ododa	6 ft 9 in (2.06 m)	210 lb (95 kg)	RS So	Atlanta, Georgia
F	34	Derrick Williams	6 ft 6 in (1.98 m)	270 lb (122 kg)	Sr	Harlem, NY

Head coach

- Chris Mooney (Princeton)

Assistant coach(es)

- Jamal Brunt (Randolph-Macon)
- Rob Jones (Toccoa Falls)
- Kim Lewis (Tulane)

Legend

- (C) Team captain
- (S) Suspended
- (I) Ineligible
- (W) Walk-on
- Injured
- Current redshirt

Roster
Last update: 2014-02-06

== Schedule ==
Date time, TV	Opponent	Result	Record	Site (attendance) city, state
Regular season
November 8*; 7:00 pm, CBS6 Xtra	Delaware	W 71–69	1–0	Robins Center (6,721); Richmond, Virginia
November 11*; 7:00 pm, CSNMA	Belmont; Hall of Fame Tip Off	W 69–61	2–0	Robins Center (4,125); Richmond, Virginia
November 16*; 7:00 pm, WTVR	Minnesota	L 59–74	2–1	Robins Center (6,422); Richmond, Virginia
November 19*; 7:00 pm	Hofstra; Hall of Fame Tip Off	W 74–63 ^{OT}	3–1	Robins Center (4,109); Richmond, Virginia
November 23*; 12:00 pm, ESPN3	vs. No. 24 North Carolina; Hall of Fame Tip Off Semifinals	L 72–82	3–2	Mohegan Sun Arena (8,113); Uncasville, Connecticut
November 24*; 3:45 pm, ESPN3	vs. Fairfield; Hall of Fame Tip Off Third-Place Game	W 68–47	4–2	Mohegan Sun Arena (8,113); Uncasville, Connecticut
November 27*; 9:00 pm	at Air Force	W 83–60	5–2	Clune Arena (2,091); Colorado Springs, Colorado
November 30*; 6:00 pm, CBS6 Xtra	James Madison	W 68–53	6–2	Robins Center (5,725); Richmond, Virginia
December 4*; 7:00 pm	at William & Mary	W 71–60	7–2	Kaplan Arena (2,621); Williamsburg, Virginia
December 7*; 2:00 pm, ESPN3	at Wake Forest	L 66–76 ^{OT}	7–3	LJVM Coliseum (8,237); Winston-Salem, North Carolina
December 14*; 6:00 pm, CSNMA+/CBS6 Xtra	Coppin State	W 71–49	8–3	Robins Center (5,804); Richmond, Virginia
December 22*; 1:00 pm, CSNMA/CBS6 Xtra	Ohio	L 69–70 ^{OT}	8–4	Robins Center (4,722); Richmond, Virginia
December 28*; 6:30 pm, NBCSN	Old Dominion	W 67–58	9–4	Robins Center (6,512); Richmond, Virginia
December 31*; 2:00 pm	at Northeastern	W 70–66	10–4	Matthews Arena (957); Boston, Massachusetts
January 4*; 3:00 pm, CSS	at No. 12 Florida	L 58–67	10–5	O'Connell Center (12,012); Gainesville, Florida
January 8; 7:00 pm	at St. Bonaventure	L 70–84	10–6 (0–1)	Reilly Center (2,992); Olean, New York
January 11; 7:00 pm, CSNMA+	at Fordham	W 77–74 ^{OT}	11–6 (1–1)	Rose Hill Gymnasium (2,911); Bronx, New York
January 18; 3:00 pm, ESPNU	Dayton	W 73–64	12–6 (2–1)	Robins Center (7,201); Richmond, Virginia
January 22; 7:00 pm, CBS6 Xtra	No. 13 Massachusetts	W 58–55	13–6 (3–1)	Robins Center (6,574); Richmond, Virginia
January 25; 4:00 pm, NBCSN	Saint Joseph's	W 77–62	14–6 (4–1)	Robins Center (7,201); Richmond, Virginia
January 29; 7:00 pm, FSMW	at No. 19 Saint Louis	L 57–77	14–7 (4–2)	Chaifetz Arena (8,823); Saint Louis, Missouri
February 1; 11:00 am, ESPN2	at VCU; Bank Of America Capital City Classic	L 70–81	14–8 (4–3)	Stuart C. Siegel Center (7,741); Richmond, Virginia
February 5; 7:00 pm, CBS6 Xtra	St. Bonaventure	W 64–62	15–8 (5–3)	Robins Center (5,036); Richmond, Virginia
February 12; 7:00 pm	at Duquesne	W 75–58	16–8 (6–3)	A. J. Palumbo Center (2,644); Pittsburgh, Pennsylvania
February 15; 6:00 pm, CSNMA+	Fordham	W 82–70	17–8 (7–3)	Robins Center (7,201); Richmond, Virginia
February 18; 7:00 pm, NBCSN	George Washington	L 65–73	17–9 (7–4)	Robins Center (5,877); Richmond, Virginia
February 22; 4:00 pm, CBSSN	La Salle	W 62–49	18–9 (8–4)	Robins Center (7,201); Richmond, Virginia
February 26; 7:00 pm, MASN	at George Mason	L 60–69	18–10 (8–5)	Patriot Center (4,011); Fairfax, Virginia
March 1; 2:00 pm, CSNMA+	at Rhode Island	L 43–66	18–11 (8–6)	Ryan Center (5,113); Kingston, Rhode Island
March 6; 9:00 pm, CBSSN	VCU	L 50–56	18–12 (8–7)	Robins Center (7,201); Richmond, Virginia
March 8; 7:00 pm, WTVR	at Dayton	L 48–60	18–13 (8–8)	UD Arena (13,455); Dayton, Ohio
Atlantic 10 tournament
March 13; 6:30 pm, NBCSN	vs. Duquesne; Second round	W 76–64	19–13	Barclays Center (6,107); Brooklyn, New York
March 14; 6:30 pm, NBCSN	vs. No. 23 VCU; Quarterfinals	L 53–71	19–14	Barclays Center (8,755); Brooklyn, New York
*Non-conference game. ^{#}Rankings from AP Poll. (#) Tournament seedings in parentheses. All times are in Eastern Time.
