= 2013–14 Dayton Flyers men's basketball team =

American college basketball season

2013–14 Dayton Flyers men's basketball
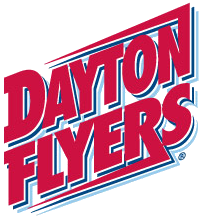

NCAA tournament, Elite Eight
- Conference: Atlantic 10 Conference

Ranking
- Coaches: No. 18
- Record: 26–11 (10–6 A-10)
- Head coach: Archie Miller (3rd season)
- Assistant coaches: Kevin Kuwik; Allen Griffin; Tom Ostrom
- Home arena: University of Dayton Arena

2013–14 Atlantic 10 men's basketball standings
	Conf.				Overall
Team	W		L	PCT	W		L	PCT
No. 25 Saint Louis	13	–	3	.813	27	–	7	.794
No. 24 VCU	12	–	4	.750	26	–	9	.743
George Washington	11	–	5	.688	24	–	9	.727
Saint Joseph's †	11	–	5	.688	24	–	10	.706
UMass	10	–	6	.625	24	–	9	.727
Dayton	10	–	6	.625	26	–	11	.703
Richmond	8	–	8	.500	19	–	14	.576
La Salle	7	–	9	.438	15	–	16	.484
St. Bonaventure	6	–	10	.375	18	–	15	.545
Rhode Island	5	–	11	.313	14	–	18	.438
Duquesne	5	–	11	.313	13	–	17	.433
George Mason	4	–	12	.250	11	–	20	.355
Fordham	2	–	14	.125	10	–	21	.323
† 2014 A10 Tournament winner Rankings from AP poll

The 2013–14 Dayton Flyers men's basketball team represented the University of Dayton during the 2013–14 NCAA Division I men's basketball season. The Flyers, led by third year head coach Archie Miller, played their home games at the University of Dayton Arena and were members of the Atlantic 10 Conference. They finished the season 26–11, 10–6 in A-10 play to finish in a tie for fifth place. They advanced to the quarterfinals of the A-10 tournament where they lost to Saint Joseph's. They received an at-large bid to the NCAA tournament where they defeated Ohio State, Syracuse and Stanford to advance to the Elite Eight where they lost to Florida. Florida would later lose to eventual National Champion Connecticut.

== Roster ==
2013–14 Dayton Flyers men's basketball team
Players
Coaches

Pos.	#	Name	Height	Weight	Year	Previous school	Hometown
G	0	Khari Price	5 ft 11 in (1.8 m)	170 lb (77 kg)	So	Salmen	Slidell, LA
G	3	Kyle Davis	6 ft 0 in (1.83 m)	165 lb (75 kg)	Fr	Morgan Park	Chicago, IL
F	5	Devin Oliver	6 ft 7 in (2.01 m)	225 lb (102 kg)	Sr	Kalamazoo Central	Kalamazoo, MI
G	11	Scoochie Smith	6 ft 2 in (1.88 m)	170 lb (77 kg)	Fr	Putnam Science Academy	New York, NY
F/C	12	Jalen Robinson	6 ft 9 in (2.06 m)	243 lb (110 kg)	So	Northland	Columbus, OH
F	21	Dyshawn Pierre	6 ft 6 in (1.98 m)	210 lb (95 kg)	So	Anderson CVI	Whitby, ON, CAN
F	22	Kendall Pollard	6 ft 6 in (1.98 m)	210 lb (95 kg)	Fr	Simeon Career Academy	Chicago, IL
G	23	Brian Vonderhaar	6 ft 0 in (1.83 m)	170 lb (77 kg)	RS Sr	Moeller	Cincinnati, OH
G	24	Jordan Sibert	6 ft 4 in (1.93 m)	187 lb (85 kg)	RS Jr	Princeton	Cincinnati, OH
F	25	Alex Gavrilovic	6 ft 9 in (2.06 m)	246 lb (112 kg)	Jr	IMG Academy	Strasbourg, FRA
F/C	35	Matt Kavanaugh	6 ft 10 in (2.08 m)	250 lb (113 kg)	RS Sr	Centerville	Centerville, OH
F/C	40	Devon Scott	6 ft 9 in (2.06 m)	215 lb (98 kg)	So	Northland	Columbus, OH
G	43	Vee Sanford	6 ft 4 in (1.93 m)	196 lb (89 kg)	RS Sr	Lexington Catholic	Lexington, KY
F	50	Bobby Wehrli	6 ft 6 in (1.98 m)	198 lb (90 kg)	So	Benet Academy	Naperville, IL
G	51	William Dupuy	5 ft 10 in (1.78 m)	160 lb (73 kg)	Fr	Grapevine High School	Colleyville, TX

Head coach

- Archie Miller (NC State)

Assistant coach(es)

- Kevin Kuwik (Notre Dame)
- Allen Griffin (Syracuse)
- Tom Ostrom (Minnesota)

Legend

- (C) Team captain
- (S) Suspended
- (I) Ineligible
- (W) Walk-on
- Injured
- Current redshirt

Roster
Last update: 29 September 2013

== Schedule ==
Date time, TV	Rank^{#}	Opponent^{#}	Result	Record	Site (attendance) city, state
Exhibition
10/26/2013*; 7:00 pm		Ryerson	W 89–62	–	UD Arena (10,807); Dayton, OH
11/02/2013*; 7:00 pm		Findlay	W 96–87	–	UD Arena (12,097); Dayton, OH
Regular season
11/09/2013*; 2:00 pm, FSOH		IPFW	W 81–80	1–0	UD Arena (12,145); Dayton, OH
11/13/2013*; 7:00 pm		Saint Francis (PA)	W 70–56	2–0	UD Arena (12,002); Dayton, OH
11/16/2013*; 12:00 pm, FSOH		St. Francis Brooklyn; Maui Invitational Opening Round	W 78–58	3–0	UD Arena (12,183); Dayton, OH
11/20/2013*; 7:00 pm, ESPN3		at Georgia Tech	W 82–72	4–0	McCamish Pavilion (6,283); Atlanta, GA
11/25/2013*; 12:00 am, ESPN2		vs. No. 11 Gonzaga; Maui Invitational First Round	W 84–79	5–0	Lahaina Civic Center (2,400); Maui, HI
11/26/2013*; 9:30 pm, ESPN		vs. No. 18 Baylor; Maui Invitational semifinals	L 66–67	5–1	Lahaina Civic Center (2,400); Maui, HI
11/27/2013*; 7:30 pm, ESPN2		vs. California; Maui Invitational 3rd place game	W 82–64	6–1	Lahaina Civic Center (2,400); Maui, HI
12/04/2013*; 7:00 pm, FSOH	No. 25	Delaware State	W 56–46	7–1	UD Arena (11,571); Dayton, OH
12/07/2013*; 8:00 pm	No. 25	at Illinois State	L 75–81	7–2	Redbird Arena (6,697); Normal, IL
12/14/2013*; 7:00 pm		Central Michigan	W 84–58	8–2	UD Arena (12,153); Dayton, OH
12/19/2013*; 7:00 pm, NBCSN		Iona	W 96–84	9–2	UD Arena (11,539); Dayton, OH
12/22/2013*; 2:00 pm, TWCS		USC	L 76–79	9–3	UD Arena (12,240); Dayton, OH
12/29/2013*; 2:00 pm, FSOH		Murray State	W 72–51	10–3	UD Arena (12,067); Dayton, OH
01/01/2014*; 2:00 pm, FSOH		Winthrop	W 81–47	11–3	UD Arena (12,041); Dayton, OH
01/04/2014*; 8:00 pm, CSS		at Ole Miss	W 83–80 ^{OT}	12–3	Tad Smith Coliseum (7,035); Biloxi, MS
Atlantic-10 regular season
01/11/2014; 11:00 am, ESPN2		Saint Louis	L 59–67	12–4 (0–1)	UD Arena (12,597); Dayton, OH
01/15/2014; 9:00 pm, WHIO		at Fordham	W 80–68	13–4 (1–1)	Rose Hill Gymnasium (2,249); Bronx, NY
01/18/2014; 3:00 pm, ESPNU		at Richmond	L 64–73	13–5 (1–2)	Robins Center (7,201); Richmond, VA
01/22/2014; 7:00 pm, CBSSN		VCU	L 66–80	13–6 (1–3)	UD Arena (12,512); Dayton, OH
01/25/2014; 4:00 pm, CBSSN		at Rhode Island	L 76–88	13–7 (1–4)	Ryan Center (6,211); Kingston, RI
01/29/2014; 7:00 pm, WHIO		Saint Joseph's	L 57–60	13–8 (1–5)	UD Arena (12,083); Dayton, OH
02/01/2014; 12:30 pm, NBCSN		George Washington	W 75–65	14–8 (2–5)	UD Arena (13,321); Dayton, OH
02/05/2014; 7:00 pm, WHIO		at George Mason	W 84–67	15–8 (3–5)	Patriot Center (3,863); Fairfax, VA
02/08/2014; 4:00 pm		at St. Bonaventure	W 72–69	16–8 (4–5)	Reilly Center (5,344); Olean, NY
02/12/2014; 7:00 pm, WHIO		Rhode Island	W 76–69	17–8 (5–5)	UD Arena (12,255); Dayton, OH
02/19/2014; 9:00 pm, CBSSN		La Salle	W 65–53	18–8 (6–5)	UD Arena (12,380); Dayton, OH
02/22/2014; 2:00 pm		at Duquesne	W 57–54	19–8 (7–5)	Consol Energy Center (6,271); Pittsburgh, OH
02/25/2014; 7:00 pm, CBSSN		at Saint Joseph's	L 53–79	19–9 (7–6)	Hagan Arena (4,051); Philadelphia, PA
03/01/2014; 11:00 am, ESPNU		Massachusetts	W 86–79	20–9 (8–6)	UD Arena (12,825); Dayton, OH
03/05/2014; 9:00 pm, CBSSN		at No. 17 Saint Louis	W 72–67	21–9 (9–6)	Chaifetz Arena (10,395); St. Louis, MO
03/08/2014; 7:00 pm, WHIO		Richmond	W 60–48	22–9 (10–6)	UD Arena (13,455); Dayton, OH
Atlantic 10 Tournament
03/13/2014; 2:30 pm, NBCSN	(5)	vs. (13) Fordham; Second round	W 87–74	23–9	Barclays Center (6,823); Brooklyn, NY
03/14/2014; 2:30 pm, NBCSN	(5)	vs. (4) St. Joseph's; Quarterfinals	L 67–70	23–10	Barclays Center (7,308); Brooklyn, NY
NCAA tournament
03/20/2014*; 12:15 pm, CBS	(11 S)	vs. (6 S) No. 22 Ohio State; Second round	W 60–59	24–10	First Niagara Center (19,260); Buffalo, NY
03/22/2014*; 7:10 pm, CBS	(11 S)	vs. (3 S) No. 14 Syracuse; Third round	W 55–53	25–10	First Niagara Center (19,420); Buffalo, NY
03/27/2014*; 7:15 pm, CBS	(11 S)	vs. (10 S) Stanford; Sweet Sixteen	W 82–72	26–10	FedExForum (14,991); Memphis TN
03/29/2014*; 6:09 pm, TBS	(11 S)	vs. (1 S) No. 1 Florida; Elite Eight	L 52–62	26–11	FedExForum (15,443); Memphis TN
*Non-conference game. ^{#}Rankings from AP Poll, (#) denotes seed within region S=South. (#) Tournament seedings in parentheses. All times are in Eastern Time.

== Rankings ==
Ranking movement Legend: ██ Improvement in ranking. ██ Decrease in ranking. RV=Others receiving votes.
Poll	Pre	Wk 2	Wk 3	Wk 4	Wk 5	Wk 6	Wk 7	Wk 8	Wk 9	Wk 10	Wk 11	Wk 12	Wk 13	Wk 14	Wk 15	Wk 16	Wk 17	Wk 18	Wk 19	Wk 20	Final
AP	NR	NR	NR	NR	25	RV	NR	NR	NR	NR	NR	NR	NR	NR	NR	NR	NR	NR	NR	NR	N/A
Coaches	NR	NR	NR	NR	RV	NR	NR	NR	NR	NR	NR	NR	NR	NR	NR	NR	NR	NR	NR	NR	18т
