= 2013–14 St. Bonaventure Bonnies men's basketball team =

American college basketball season

2013–14 St. Bonaventure Bonnies men's basketball
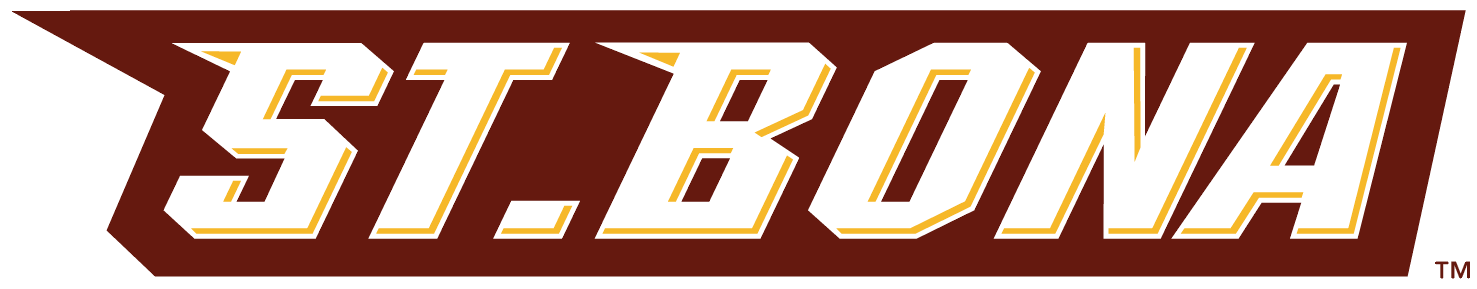
- Conference: Atlantic 10 Conference
- Record: 18–15 (6–10 A-10)
- Head coach: Mark Schmidt (7th season)
- Assistant coaches: Dave Moore; Jeff Massey; Steve Curran
- Home arena: Reilly Center

2013–14 Atlantic 10 men's basketball standings
	Conf.				Overall
Team	W		L	PCT	W		L	PCT
No. 25 Saint Louis	13	–	3	.813	27	–	7	.794
No. 24 VCU	12	–	4	.750	26	–	9	.743
George Washington	11	–	5	.688	24	–	9	.727
Saint Joseph's †	11	–	5	.688	24	–	10	.706
UMass	10	–	6	.625	24	–	9	.727
Dayton	10	–	6	.625	26	–	11	.703
Richmond	8	–	8	.500	19	–	14	.576
La Salle	7	–	9	.438	15	–	16	.484
St. Bonaventure	6	–	10	.375	18	–	15	.545
Rhode Island	5	–	11	.313	14	–	18	.438
Duquesne	5	–	11	.313	13	–	17	.433
George Mason	4	–	12	.250	11	–	20	.355
Fordham	2	–	14	.125	10	–	21	.323
† 2014 A10 Tournament winner Rankings from AP poll

The 2013–14 St. Bonaventure Bonnies men's basketball team represented St. Bonaventure University during the 2013–14 NCAA Division I men's basketball season. The Bonnies, led by seventh year head coach Mark Schmidt, played their home games at the Reilly Center and were members of the Atlantic 10 Conference. They finished the season 18–15, 6–10 in A-10 play to finish in ninth place. They advanced to the semifinals of the A-10 tournament where they lost to Saint Joseph's. Despite an overall winning record that included an upset over top-ranked Saint Louis in the A-10 tournament quarterfinals, the Bonnies were not invited to a postseason bid due to an inability to come to an agreement with the College Basketball Invitational.

== Roster ==
2013–14 St. Bonaventure Bonnies men's basketball team
Players
Coaches

Pos.	#	Name	Height	Weight	Year	Hometown
G	3	Charlon Kloof	6 ft 3 in (1.91 m)	195 lb (88 kg)	Sr	Paramaribo, SUR
G	4	Jalen Adams	6 ft 4 in (1.93 m)	175 lb (79 kg)	Fr	Saginaw, MI
G	5	Jordan Gathers	6 ft 3 in (1.91 m)	200 lb (91 kg)	Jr	Los Angeles, CA
G	10	Danny Farrell	6 ft 0 in (1.83 m)	170 lb (77 kg)	Sr	Binghamton, NY
F	11	Xavier Smith	6 ft 8 in (2.03 m)	205 lb (93 kg)	Fr	Plano, TX
G/F	12	Denzel Gregg	6 ft 7 in (2.01 m)	210 lb (95 kg)	Fr	Syracuse, NY
F/C	15	Chris Dees	6 ft 8 in (2.03 m)	260 lb (118 kg)	Jr	Sylmar, CA
C	20	Matthias Runs	7 ft 0 in (2.13 m)	240 lb (109 kg)	So	Hilversum, NED
F	21	Dion Wright	6 ft 7 in (2.01 m)	215 lb (98 kg)	So	Lakewood, CA
G	23	Andell Cumberbatch	6 ft 4 in (1.93 m)	195 lb (88 kg)	Jr	East Orange, NJ
G	24	Matthew Wright	6 ft 4 in (1.93 m)	200 lb (91 kg)	Sr	Toronto, ON
F/C	33	Marquise Simmons	6 ft 8 in (2.03 m)	235 lb (107 kg)	RS Sr	Capitol Heights, MD
C	35	Youssou Ndoye	7 ft 0 in (2.13 m)	245 lb (111 kg)	Jr	Dakar, SEN
G/F	43	Jean Yves Toupane	6 ft 7 in (2.01 m)	185 lb (84 kg)	So	Dakar, SEN

Head coach

- Mark Schmidt (Boston College)

Assistant coach(es)

- Dave Moore (Bethel (TN))
- Jeff Massey (Xavier)
- Steve Curran (Merrimack)

Legend

- (C) Team captain
- (S) Suspended
- (I) Ineligible
- (W) Walk-on
- Injured
- Current redshirt

Roster
Last update: 29 September 2013

== Schedule ==
Date time, TV	Opponent	Result	Record	Site (attendance) city, state
Exhibition
11/02/2013*; 3:00 pm	Mansfield	W 102–57		Reilly Center (2,726); Olean, NY
Regular season
11/09/2013*; 7:00 pm	South Dakota	W 68–46	1–0	Reilly Center (3,855); Olean, NY
11/11/2013*; 7:00 pm	Abilene Christian	W 75–47	2–0	Reilly Center (3,042); Olean, NY
11/16/2013*; 7:00 pm	Canisius	W 86–64	3–0	Reilly Center (4,568); Olean, NY
11/19/2013*; 7:00 pm, TWCS	at Siena; Franciscan Cup	L 70–72	3–1	Times Union Center (5,654); Albany, NY
11/25/2013*; 8:30 pm	vs. Southern Illinois; Gulf Coast Showcase Quarterfinals	W 83–71	4–1	Germain Arena (487); Estero, FL
11/26/2013*; 8:30 pm	vs. Wagner; Gulf Coast Showcase semifinals	W 70–67	5–1	Germain Arena (N/A); Estero, FL
11/27/2013*; 8:30 pm	vs. Louisiana Tech; Gulf Coast Showcase championship	L 72–76	5–2	Germain Arena (N/A); Estero, FL
12/03/2013*; 7:00 pm	UMass Lowell	W 67–58	6–2	Reilly Center (2,860); Olean, NY
12/07/2013*; 2:00 pm, TWCS	at Buffalo	L 73–78	6–3	Alumni Arena (4,652); Buffalo, NY
12/14/2013*; 2:00 pm	at Iona	W 102–89	7–3	Hynes Athletic Center (2,019); New Rochelle, NY
12/17/2013*; 7:00 pm	at Wake Forest	L 62–77	7–4	LJVM Coliseum (7,291); Winston-Salem, NC
12/21/2013*; 5:00 pm, TWCS	at Niagara	W 74–72	8–4	Gallagher Center (1,856); Lewiston, NY
12/30/2013*; 5:00 pm	Delaware	W 80–73	9–4	Reilly Center (3,689); Olean, NY
01/04/2014*; 2:00 pm, NBCSN	Cornell	W 81–57	10–4	Reilly Center (3,244); Olean, NY
01/08/2014; 7:00 pm	Richmond	W 84–70	11–4 (1–0)	Reilly Center (2,992); Olean, NY
01/11/2014; 12:30 pm, NBCSN	at No. 19 Massachusetts	L 68–73	11–5 (1–1)	Mullins Center (6,634); Amherst, MA
01/15/2014; 8:00 pm	at No. 24 Saint Louis	L 60–66	11–6 (1–2)	Chaifetz Arena (8,388); St. Louis, MO
01/18/2014; 7:00 pm	George Washington	L 71–79	11–7 (1–3)	Reilly Center (5,160); Olean, NY
01/22/2014; 9:00 pm, CBSSN	La Salle	W 66–51	12–7 (2–3)	Reilly Center (3,253); Olean, NY
01/25/2014; 7:00 pm, SNY	at Duquesne	L 81–83	12–8 (2–4)	A. J. Palumbo Center (2,947); Pittsburgh, PA
01/29/2014; 7:00 pm	No. 19 Massachusetts	W 78–65	13–8 (3–4)	Reilly Center (3,881); Olean, NY
02/05/2014; 7:00 pm	at Richmond	L 62–64	13–9 (3–5)	Robins Center (5,036); Richmond, VA
02/08/2014; 4:00 pm	Dayton	L 69–72	13–10 (3–6)	Reilly Center (5,344); Olean, NY
02/12/2014; 7:00 pm, SNY	at Fordham	W 76–65	14–10 (4–6)	Rose Hill Gymnasium (1,623); Bronx, NY
02/15/2014; 6:00 pm	at George Mason	W 85–73	15–10 (5–6)	Patriot Center (7,838); Fairfax, VA
02/19/2014; 7:00 pm, SNY	Duquesne	W 71–67	16–10 (6–6)	Reilly Center (3,722); Olean, NY
02/22/2014; 4:00 pm	Rhode Island	L 78–87	16–11 (6–7)	Reilly Center (5,405); Olean, NY
02/26/2014; 7:00 pm	at La Salle	L 67–75	16–12 (6–8)	Tom Gola Arena (1,631); Philadelphia, PA
03/01/2014; 3:00 pm, NBCSN	Saint Joseph's	L 74–83	16–13 (6–9)	Reilly Center (3,975); Olean, NY
03/08/2014; 7:00 pm, SNY	at VCU	L 67–86	16–14 (6–10)	Stuart C. Siegel Center (7,741); Richmond, VA
Atlantic 10 tournament
03/13/2014; 12:00 pm, CSN	vs. La Salle; Second round	W 82–72	17–14	Barclays Center (6,823); Brooklyn, NY
03/14/2014; 12:00 pm, NBCSN	vs. No. 18 Saint Louis; Quarterfinals	W 71–68	18–14	Barclays Center (7,308); Brooklyn, NY
03/15/2014; 1:30 pm, CBSSN	vs. St. Joseph's; Semifinals	L 48–67	18–15	Barclays Center (10,133); Brooklyn, NY
*Non-conference game. ^{#}Rankings from AP Poll/Coaches' Poll. (#) Tournament seedings in parentheses. All times are in Eastern Time.
