= 2013–14 UMass Minutemen basketball team =

American college basketball season

2013–14 UMass Minutemen basketball

Charleston Classic champions

NCAA tournament, round of 64
- Conference: Atlantic 10 Conference
- Record: 24–9 (10–6 A-10)
- Head coach: Derek Kellogg (6th season)
- Assistant coaches: Shyrone Chatman; Adam Ginsburg; Marlon Williamson
- Home arena: William D. Mullins Memorial Center

2013–14 Atlantic 10 men's basketball standings
	Conf.				Overall
Team	W		L	PCT	W		L	PCT
No. 25 Saint Louis	13	–	3	.813	27	–	7	.794
No. 24 VCU	12	–	4	.750	26	–	9	.743
George Washington	11	–	5	.688	24	–	9	.727
Saint Joseph's †	11	–	5	.688	24	–	10	.706
UMass	10	–	6	.625	24	–	9	.727
Dayton	10	–	6	.625	26	–	11	.703
Richmond	8	–	8	.500	19	–	14	.576
La Salle	7	–	9	.438	15	–	16	.484
St. Bonaventure	6	–	10	.375	18	–	15	.545
Rhode Island	5	–	11	.313	14	–	18	.438
Duquesne	5	–	11	.313	13	–	17	.433
George Mason	4	–	12	.250	11	–	20	.355
Fordham	2	–	14	.125	10	–	21	.323
† 2014 A10 Tournament winner Rankings from AP poll

The 2013–14 Massachusetts Minutemen basketball team represented the University of Massachusetts Amherst during the 2013–14 NCAA Division I men's basketball season. The Minutemen, led by sixth year head coach Derek Kellogg, played their home games at the William D. Mullins Memorial Center and were members of the Atlantic 10 Conference.

Early in the season UMass won the Charleston Classic tournament. Following this tournament victory and beginning the season 6–0, the Minutemen would be ranked #24 in the AP Poll. This marked the first time since 1998 that UMass would be ranked in the AP Top 25. They finished the regular season 23–7, 10–6 in A-10 play to finish in a tie for fifth place. The Minutemen were eliminated in the A-10 tournament quarterfinals. They earned an at-large bid to the NCAA tournament, the school's first NCAA bid in 16 years. They lost in the first round of the NCAA Tournament to Tennessee to finish the season 24–9.

In 2014, shortly after the end of the season, sophomore starting guard Derrick Gordon came out as gay, making him the first Division I men's basketball player to do so while still playing in college.

== Roster ==
Number	Name	Position	Height	Weight	Year	Hometown
0	Demetrius Dyson	Guard	6–5	215	Freshman	Covington, Tennessee
1	Maxie Esho	Forward	6–8	205	RS Junior	Upper Marlboro, Maryland
2	Derrick Gordon	Guard	6–3	190	RS Sophomore	Plainfield, New Jersey
3	Chaz Williams	Guard	5–9	175	RS Senior	Brooklyn, New York
4	Jabarie Hinds	Guard	5–11	185	Junior	Mount Vernon, New York
5	Clyde Santee	Guard	6–7	180	Freshman	Houston, Texas
11	Tyler Bergantino	Forward/Center	6–9	245	Sophomore	Spring Hill, Florida
12	Trey Davis	Guard	6–0	180	Sophomore	DeSoto, Texas
13	Zach Coleman	Forward	6–7	210	Freshman	Dallas, Texas
22	Sampson Carter	Forward	6–8	220	RS Senior	Baton Rouge, Louisiana
24	Seth Berger	Forward	6–7	210	Freshman	Seattle, Washington
25	Cady Lalanne	Center	6–10	250	Junior	Orlando, Florida
34	Raphiael Putney	Forward	6–9	185	RS Senior	Woodbridge, Virginia

== Schedule ==
Date time, TV	Rank^{#}	Opponent^{#}	Result	Record	Site (attendance) city, state
Exhibition
11/05/2013*; 7:00 pm		American International	W 89–76	–	Mullins Center (2,932); Amherst, MA
Regular season
11/10/2013*; 3:00 pm, NESN		vs. Boston College; Coaches vs. Cancer Boston Tip-Off	W 86–73	1–0	TD Garden (6,037); Boston, MA
11/14/2013*; 11:00 am, ESPN2		LSU; ESPN College Hoops Tip-Off Marathon	W 92–90	2–0	Mullins Center (5,182); Amherst, MA
11/17/2013*; 1:00 pm		Youngstown State	W 85–69	3–0	Mullins Center (4,231); Amherst, MA
11/21/2013*; 12:30 pm, ESPN3		vs. Nebraska; Charleston Classic First Round	W 96–90	4–0	TD Arena (N/A); Charleston, SC
11/22/2013*; 2:30 pm, ESPNU		vs. No. 19 New Mexico; Charleston Classic semifinals	W 81–65	5–0	TD Arena (1,730); Charleston, SC
11/24/2013*; 9:00 pm, ESPN2		vs. Clemson; Charleston Classic Championship	W 62–56	6–0	TD Arena (2,117); Charleston, SC
12/03/2013*; 7:00 pm	No. 21	at Eastern Michigan	W 69–57	7–0	Convocation Center (1,314); Ypsilanti, MI
12/07/2013*; 1:30 pm, CBSSN	No. 21	vs. BYU; Hall of Fame Holiday Classic	W 105–96	8–0	MassMutual Center (7,331); Springfield, MA
12/14/2013*; 3:00 pm, NBCSN	No. 22	Northern Illinois	W 80–54	9–0	Mullins Center (4,694); Amherst, MA
12/18/2013*; 7:00 pm	No. 22	at Ohio	W 83–71	10–0	Convocation Center (6,329); Athens, OH
12/21/2013*; 2:00 pm, FSN	No. 22	vs. Florida State; Orange Bowl Basketball Classic	L 55–60	10–1	BB&T Center (11,214); Sunrise, FL
12/28/2013*; 6:00 pm, ESPNU	No. 23	Providence	W 69–67 ^{OT}	11–1	Mullins Center (9,493); Amherst, MA
01/04/2014*; 7:00 pm	No. 23	Miami (OH)	W 73–65	12–1	Mullins Center (5,834); Amherst, MA
01/08/2014; 7:00 pm, CSN	No. 19	Saint Joseph's	W 66–62	13–1 (1–0)	Mullins Center (4,621); Amherst, MA
01/11/2014; 12:30 pm, NBCSN	No. 19	St. Bonaventure	W 73–68	14–1 (2–0)	Mullins Center (6,634); Amherst, MA
01/15/2014; 7:00 pm, NESN+	No. 16	at George Mason	W 88–87	15–1 (3–0)	Patriot Center (4,014); Fairfax, VA
01/18/2014*; 7:00 pm	No. 16	at Elon	W 84–74	16–1	Alumni Gym (1,607); Elon, NC
01/22/2014; 7:00 pm	No. 13	at Richmond	L 55–58	16–2 (3–1)	Robins Center (6,574); Richmond, VA
01/26/2014; 12:00 pm, NBCSN	No. 13	Fordham	W 90–52	17–2 (4–1)	Mullins Center (9,493); Amherst, MA
01/29/2014; 7:00 pm	No. 21	at St. Bonaventure	L 65–78	17–3 (4–2)	Reilly Center (3,881); Olean, NY
02/01/2014; 6:00 pm, CBSSN	No. 21	at Saint Joseph's	L 68–73	17–4 (4–3)	Hagan Arena (4,200); Philadelphia, PA
02/05/2014; 7:00 pm, CBSSN		La Salle	W 79–67	18–4 (5–3)	Mullins Center (4,345); Amherst, MA
02/09/2014; 4:00 pm, CBSSN		at Rhode Island	W 73–68	19–4 (6–3)	Ryan Center (6,511); Kingston, RI
02/12/2014; 7:00 pm		George Mason	L 80–91	19–5 (6–4)	Mullins Center (5,322); Amherst, MA
02/15/2014; 2:00 pm		at George Washington	W 67–61	20–5 (7–4)	Smith Center (4,705); Washington, D.C.
02/21/2014; 7:00 pm, ESPN2		VCU	W 80–75	21–5 (8–4)	Mullins Center (9,493); Amherst, MA
02/26/2014; 7:00 pm		Rhode Island	W 70–67	22–5 (9–4)	Mullins Center (6,234); Amherst, MA
03/01/2014; 11:00 am, ESPNU		at Dayton	L 79–86	22–6 (9–5)	UD Arena (12,825); Dayton, OH
03/05/2014; 7:00 pm		at Duquesne	W 78–74	23–6 (10–5)	Palumbo Center (2,297); Pittsburgh, PA
03/08/2014; 2:00 pm, CBSSN		No. 17 Saint Louis	L 62–64	23–7 (10–6)	Mullins Center (9,493); Amherst, MA
Atlantic 10 tournament
03/13/2014; 9:00 pm, CSN		vs. Rhode Island; Second round	W 65–61	24–7	Barclays Center (6,107); Brooklyn, NY
03/14/2014; 9:00 pm, NBCSN		vs. George Washington; Quarterfinals	L 77–85	24–8	Barclays Center (8,755); Brooklyn, NY
NCAA tournament
03/21/2014; 2:45 pm, CBS	No. (6 MW)	vs. (11 MW) Tennessee; Second round	L 67–86	24–9	PNC Arena (16,988); Raleigh, NC
*Non-conference game. ^{#}Rankings from AP Poll, (#) denotes seed within region MW=Midwest. (#) Tournament seedings in parentheses. All times are in Eastern Time.

== Rankings ==
Ranking movement Legend: ██ Increase in ranking. ██ Decrease in ranking. (RV) Received votes but unranked. (NR) Not ranked.
Poll	Pre	Wk 2	Wk 3	Wk 4	Wk 5	Wk 6	Wk 7	Wk 8	Wk 9	Wk 10	Wk 11	Wk 12	Wk 13	Wk 14	Wk 15	Wk 16	Wk 17	Wk 18	Wk 19	Wk 20	Final
AP	NR	NR	RV	24	21	22	22	23	23	19	16	13	21	NR	NR	NR	RV	RV	NR	RV	N/A
Coaches	NR	RV	RV	RV	22	20	20	22	19	19	15	12т	19	RV	RV	NR	RV	RV	RV	NR	NR
