= 2013–14 George Washington Colonials men's basketball team =

American college basketball season

2013–14 George Washington Colonials men's basketball

NCAA tournament, round of 64
- Conference: Atlantic 10 Conference
- Record: 24–9 (11–5 A-10)
- Head coach: Mike Lonergan (3rd season)
- Assistant coaches: Hajj Turner; Maurice Joseph
- Home arena: Charles E. Smith Center

2013–14 Atlantic 10 men's basketball standings
	Conf.				Overall
Team	W		L	PCT	W		L	PCT
No. 25 Saint Louis	13	–	3	.813	27	–	7	.794
No. 24 VCU	12	–	4	.750	26	–	9	.743
George Washington	11	–	5	.688	24	–	9	.727
Saint Joseph's †	11	–	5	.688	24	–	10	.706
UMass	10	–	6	.625	24	–	9	.727
Dayton	10	–	6	.625	26	–	11	.703
Richmond	8	–	8	.500	19	–	14	.576
La Salle	7	–	9	.438	15	–	16	.484
St. Bonaventure	6	–	10	.375	18	–	15	.545
Rhode Island	5	–	11	.313	14	–	18	.438
Duquesne	5	–	11	.313	13	–	17	.433
George Mason	4	–	12	.250	11	–	20	.355
Fordham	2	–	14	.125	10	–	21	.323
† 2014 A10 Tournament winner Rankings from AP poll

The 2013–14 George Washington Colonials men's basketball team represented George Washington University during the 2013–14 NCAA Division I men's basketball season. The Colonials, led by third year head coach Mike Lonergan, played their home games at the Charles E. Smith Athletic Center and were members of the Atlantic 10 Conference. They finished the season 24–9, 11–5 in A-10 play to finish in a tie for third place. They advanced to the semifinals of the A-10 tournament where they lost to VCU. They received an at-large bid to the NCAA tournament where they lost in the second round to Memphis.

== Roster ==
2013–14 George Washington Colonials men's basketball team
Players
Coaches

Pos.	#	Name	Height	Weight	Year	Hometown
G	1	Maurice Creek	6 ft 5 in (1.96 m)	195 lb (88 kg)	GS	Oxon Hill, MD
G	3	Miguel Cartagena	6 ft 2 in (1.88 m)	170 lb (77 kg)	Fr	Aibonito, Puerto Rico
G	5	Nick Griffin	6 ft 3 in (1.91 m)	173 lb (78 kg)	Fr	Rockville, MD
G	11	Kethan Savage	6 ft 3 in (1.91 m)	200 lb (91 kg)	So	Fairfax, VA
G/F	13	Patricio Garino	6 ft 6 in (1.98 m)	211 lb (96 kg)	So	Mar del Plata, ARG
F	20	Ryan McCoy	6 ft 9 in (2.06 m)	207 lb (94 kg)	Jr	Skillman, NJ
F	21	Kevin Larsen	6 ft 10 in (2.08 m)	247 lb (112 kg)	So	Copenhagen, DEN
G	22	Joe McDonald	6 ft 1 in (1.85 m)	184 lb (83 kg)	So	Lorton, VA
F	30	Nemanja Mikic	6 ft 8 in (2.03 m)	213 lb (97 kg)	Sr	Novi Sad, SRB
F	32	Isaiah Armwood	6 ft 9 in (2.06 m)	208 lb (94 kg)	Sr	Baltimore, MD
F	33	Paris Maragkos	6 ft 9 in (2.06 m)	243 lb (110 kg)	So	Marousi, GRE
F	34	John Kopriva	6 ft 8 in (2.03 m)	214 lb (97 kg)	Jr	Milwaukee, WI
F	43	Skyler White	6 ft 8 in (2.03 m)	238 lb (108 kg)	Fr	Clyde Hill, WA

Head coach

- Mike Lonergan (Catholic)

Assistant coach(es)

- Hajj Turner (Louisville)
- Maurice Joseph (Vermont)

Legend

- (C) Team captain
- (S) Suspended
- (I) Ineligible
- (W) Walk-on
- Injured
- Current redshirt

Roster
Last update: 29 September 2013

== Schedule ==
Date time, TV	Rank^{#}	Opponent^{#}	Result	Record	Site (attendance) city, state
Exhibition
11/02/2013*; 2:00 pm		Bowie	W 85–68	–	Smith Center (1,501); Washington, D.C.
Regular season
11/08/2013*; 7:00 pm		Radford	W 76–54	1–0	Smith Center (2,531); Washington, D.C.
11/12/2013*; 7:00 pm		Maine	W 108–81	2–0	Smith Center (1,448); Washington, D.C.
11/16/2013*; 7:00 pm		at Manhattan	W 80–74	3–0	Draddy Gymnasium (2,302); Bronx, NY
11/19/2013*; 7:00 pm		Delaware State	W 94–50	4–0	Smith Center (2,037); Washington, D.C.
11/28/2013*; 2:00 pm, ESPNU		vs. Miami (FL); The Wooden Legacy First Round	W 71–63 ^{OT}	5–0	Titan Gym (N/A); Fullerton, CA
11/29/2013*; 3:30 pm, ESPN		vs. No. 25 Marquette; The Wooden Legacy semifinals	L 60–76	5–1	Titan Gym (N/A); Fullerton, CA
12/01/2013*; 6:30 pm, ESPNU		vs. No. 20 Creighton; The Wooden Legacy 3rd place game	W 60–53	6–1	Honda Center (N/A); Anaheim, CA
12/04/2013*; 7:00 pm, CSNMA		Rutgers	W 93–87	7–1	Smith Center (3,089); Washington, D.C.
12/08/2013*; 3:30 pm, MASN		vs. Maryland; BB&T Classic Basketball Tournament	W 77–75	8–1	Verizon Center (9,183); Washington, D.C.
12/11/2013*; 7:00 pm, CSNMA		Boston University	W 70–60	9–1	Smith Center (2,630); Washington, D.C.
12/21/2013*; 2:30 pm		UMBC	W 74–61	10–1	Smith Center (2,219); Washington, D.C.
12/28/2013*; 4:00 pm		at Hofstra	W 69–58	11–1	Mack Sports Complex (1,869); Hempstead, NY
12/31/2013*; 3:00 pm, MASN2		at Kansas State	L 55–72	11–2	Bramlage Coliseum (12,528); Manhattan, KS
01/03/2014*; 7:00 pm, CSNMA+		Georgia	W 73–55	12–2	Smith Center (3,063); Washington, D.C.
01/09/2014; 8:00 pm, NBCSN		at La Salle	L 72–76	12–3 (0–1)	Tom Gola Arena (1,930); Philadelphia, PA
01/11/2014; 2:30 pm, NBCSN		Rhode Island	W 69–56	13–3 (1–1)	Smith Center (2,644); Washington, D.C.
01/14/2014; 7:00 pm, CBSSN		VCU	W 76–66	14–3 (2–1)	Smith Center (4,874); Washington, D.C.
01/18/2014; 7:00 pm		at St. Bonaventure	W 79–71	15–3 (3–1)	Reilly Center (5,160); Olean, NY
01/25/2014; 12:00 pm, NBCSN		at George Mason	W 75–69	16–3 (4–1)	Patriot Center (7,714); Fairfax, VA
01/29/2014; 7:00 pm, CSNMA+		La Salle	W 69–47	17–3 (5–1)	Smith Center (3,611); Washington, D.C.
02/01/2014; 12:30 pm, NBCSN		at Dayton	L 65–75	17–4 (5–2)	UD Arena (13,321); Dayton, OH
02/05/2014; 7:00 pm		Duquesne	W 71–57	18–4 (6–2)	Smith Center (3,047); Washington, D.C.
02/08/2014; 4:00 pm, CSNMA		Fordham	W 93–67	19–4 (7–2)	Smith Center (4,617); Washington, D.C.
02/12/2014; 7:00 pm, NBCSN		at VCU	L 75–92	19–5 (7–3)	Stuart C. Siegel Center (7,741); Richmond, VA
02/15/2014; 2:00 pm, CSNMA		Massachusetts	L 61–67	19–6 (7–4)	Smith Center (4,705); Washington, D.C.
02/18/2014; 7:00 pm, NBCSN		at Richmond	W 73–65	20–6 (8–4)	Robins Center (5,877); Richmond, VA
02/22/2014; 8:00 pm, CSNMA+		at No. 10 Saint Louis	L 59–66	20–7 (8–5)	Chaifetz Arena (10,623); St. Louis, MO
03/02/2014; 2:00 pm, NBCSN		George Mason	W 66–58	21–7 (9–5)	Smith Center (4,307); Washington, D.C.
03/05/2014; 9:00 pm, CSNMA+		Saint Joseph's	W 76–71	22–7 (10–5)	Smith Center (4,228); Washington, D.C.
03/08/2014; 2:00 pm, CSNMA		at Fordham	W 70–67	23–7 (11–5)	Rose Hill Gymnasium (3,200); Bronx, NY
Atlantic 10 tournament
03/14/2014; 9:00 pm, NBCSN		vs. Massachusetts; Quarterfinals	W 85–77	24–7	Barclays Center (8,755); Brooklyn, NY
03/15/2014; 4:00 pm, NBCSN		vs. No. 23 VCU; Semifinals	L 55–74	24–8	Barclays Center (10,133); Brooklyn, NY
NCAA tournament
03/21/2014*; 6:55 pm, TBS	No. (9 E)	vs. (8 E) Memphis; Second round	L 66–71	24–9	PNC Arena (17,472); Raleigh, NC
*Non-conference game. ^{#}Rankings from AP Poll, (#) denotes seed within region E=East. (#) Tournament seedings in parentheses. All times are in Eastern Time.
