= 2013–14 Atlantic 10 Conference men's basketball season =

- League: NCAA Division I
- Sport: Basketball
- Teams: 13
- TV partner(s): CBSSN, NBCSN, CBS

Tournament

Atlantic 10 men's basketball seasons
- ← 12–13 14–15 →

2013–14 Atlantic 10 men's basketball standings
	Conf.				Overall
Team	W		L	PCT	W		L	PCT
No. 25 Saint Louis	13	–	3	.813	27	–	7	.794
No. 24 VCU	12	–	4	.750	26	–	9	.743
George Washington	11	–	5	.688	24	–	9	.727
Saint Joseph's †	11	–	5	.688	24	–	10	.706
UMass	10	–	6	.625	24	–	9	.727
Dayton	10	–	6	.625	26	–	11	.703
Richmond	8	–	8	.500	19	–	14	.576
La Salle	7	–	9	.438	15	–	16	.484
St. Bonaventure	6	–	10	.375	18	–	15	.545
Rhode Island	5	–	11	.313	14	–	18	.438
Duquesne	5	–	11	.313	13	–	17	.433
George Mason	4	–	12	.250	11	–	20	.355
Fordham	2	–	14	.125	10	–	21	.323
† 2014 A10 Tournament winner Rankings from AP poll

The 2013–14 Atlantic 10 Conference men's basketball season was the 38th season of Atlantic 10 Conference basketball. The season marked the first for new member, George Mason, following the sudden departure of Butler and Xavier. The 2014 Atlantic 10 men's basketball tournament was held at Barclays Center in Brooklyn, New York.

The defending regular season and tournament champions were Saint Louis.
