= 2013–14 Saint Joseph's Hawks men's basketball team =

American college basketball season

2013–14 Saint Joseph's Hawks men's basketball
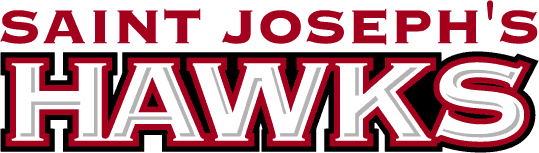

Atlantic 10 tournament champions

NCAA tournament, round of 64
- Conference: Atlantic 10 Conference
- Record: 24–10 (11–5 A-10)
- Head coach: Phil Martelli (19th season)
- Assistant coaches: Mark Bass; David Duda; Geoff Arnold
- Home arena: Hagan Arena

2013–14 Atlantic 10 men's basketball standings
	Conf.				Overall
Team	W		L	PCT	W		L	PCT
No. 25 Saint Louis	13	–	3	.813	27	–	7	.794
No. 24 VCU	12	–	4	.750	26	–	9	.743
George Washington	11	–	5	.688	24	–	9	.727
Saint Joseph's †	11	–	5	.688	24	–	10	.706
UMass	10	–	6	.625	24	–	9	.727
Dayton	10	–	6	.625	26	–	11	.703
Richmond	8	–	8	.500	19	–	14	.576
La Salle	7	–	9	.438	15	–	16	.484
St. Bonaventure	6	–	10	.375	18	–	15	.545
Rhode Island	5	–	11	.313	14	–	18	.438
Duquesne	5	–	11	.313	13	–	17	.433
George Mason	4	–	12	.250	11	–	20	.355
Fordham	2	–	14	.125	10	–	21	.323
† 2014 A10 Tournament winner Rankings from AP poll

The 2013–14 Saint Joseph's Hawks basketball team represented Saint Joseph's University during the 2013–14 NCAA Division I men's basketball season. The Hawks, led by 19th-year head coach Phil Martelli, played their home games at Hagan Arena and were members of the Atlantic 10 Conference. They finished the season 24–10, 11–5 in A-10 play to finish in a tie for third place. They were champions of the A-10 tournament to earn the conference's automatic bid to the NCAA tournament, where they lost in the second round to UConn.

== Previous season ==
The Hawks were the preseason pick to win the Atlantic 10 Conference. However, they did not meet expectations and finished with an 8–8 record in the conference.

== Offseason ==
=== Departures ===
Name	Number	Pos.	Height	Weight	Year	Hometown	Reason for departure
Carl Jones	35	G	5'11"	160	Senior	Garfield Heights, Ohio	Graduated

== Roster ==
Number	Name	Position	Height	Weight	Year	Hometown
0	Evan Maschmeyer	Guard	6–3	200	Junior	Jeffersonville, Indiana
10	Langston Galloway	Guard	6–2	202	Senior	Baton Rouge, Louisiana
11	Daryus Quarles	Forward	6–6	186	Senior	Paulsboro, New Jersey
13	Ronald Roberts Jr.	Forward	6–8	225	Senior	Bayonne, New Jersey
15	Isaiah Miles	Forward	6–7	223	Sophomore	Baltimore, Maryland
20	Brendan Casper	Forward	6–6	215	Freshman	Audubon, Pennsylvania
22	Kyle Molock	Guard	6–2	192	RS freshman	Dublin, Ohio
24	Chris Wilson	Guard	6–3	210	Junior	Fayetteville, North Carolina
25	Eric Kindler	Forward	6–5	223	Junior	Mechanicsburg, Pennsylvania
32	Papa Ndao	Forward	6–8	225	Junior	Dakar, Senegal
34	Javon Baumann	Center	6–8	257	RS freshman	Solms-Oberbiel, Germany
40	Jai Williams	Forward	6–9	275	Freshman	Philadelphia, Pennsylvania
41	Colin Kelly	Forward	6–5	210	Senior	West Deptford Township, New Jersey
43	DeAndre' Bembry	Forward	6–6	200	Freshman	Charlotte, North Carolina
45	Halil Kanačević	Forward	6–8	255	Senior	Staten Island, New York
	Aaron Brown	Guard	6–5	220	Junior	Darby, PA

== Schedule ==
Date time, TV	Rank^{#}	Opponent^{#}	Result	Record	Site (attendance) city, state
Regular season
11/09/2013*; 7:00 pm		at Vermont	W 74–64	1–0	Patrick Gym (2,698); Burlington, VT
11/13/2013*; 7:00 pm		Marist	W 81–62	2–0	Hagan Arena (3,871); Philadelphia, PA
11/16/2013*; 7:00 pm, TCN		Creighton	L 79–83	2–1	Hagan Arena (4,200); Philadelphia, PA
11/28/2013*; 8:30 pm, ESPN2		vs. LSU; Old Spice Classic First Round	L 65–82	2–2	HP Field House (2,351); Orlando, FL
11/29/2013*; 8:00 pm, ESPNU		vs. Siena; Old Spice Classic Consolation 2nd Round	W 78–66	3–2	HP Field House (2,612); Orlando, FL
12/01/2013*; 12:00 pm, ESPNU		vs. Washington State; Old Spice Classic 5th place game	W 72–67	4–2	HP Field House (N/A); Orlando, FL
12/04/2013*; 8:00 pm, ESPNews		at Temple	L 69–77	4–3	Liacouras Center (8,039); Philadelphia, PA
12/07/2013*; 6:00 pm, CBSSN		No. 14 Villanova	L 68–98	4–4	Hagan Arena (4,200); Philadelphia, PA
12/18/2013*; 7:00 pm, TCN		Drexel	W 75–55	5–4	Hagan Arena (3,651); Philadelphia, PA
12/21/2013*; 3:00 pm		at Loyola	W 88–77	6–4	Reitz Arena (1,032); Baltimore, MD
12/29/2013*; 5:00 pm		Boston University	W 73–67	7–4	Hagan Arena (4,051); Philadelphia, PA
12/31/2013*; 2:00 pm		Binghamton	W 71–44	8–4	Hagan Arena (4,076); Philadelphia, PA
01/04/2014*; 2:00 pm		Denver	W 53–52	9–4	Hagan Arena (4,076); Philadelphia, PA
01/08/2014; 7:00 pm, TCN		at No. 19 Massachusetts	L 62–66	9–5 (0–1)	Mullins Center (4,621); Amherst, MA
01/11/2014; 8:00 pm, CBSSN		at George Mason	W 84–80	10–5 (1–1)	Patriot Center (5,027); Fairfax, VA
01/15/2014; 7:00 pm		Duquesne	W 84–75	11–5 (2–1)	Hagan Arena (3,927); Philadelphia, PA
01/18/2014*; 7:00 pm		at Penn	W 85–68	12–5	Palestra (8,722); Philadelphia, PA
01/22/2014; 7:00 pm, TCN		Rhode Island	W 61–57	13–5 (3–1)	Hagan Arena (3,861); Philadelphia, PA
01/25/2014; 4:00 pm, NBCSN		at Richmond	L 62–77	13–6 (3–2)	Robins Center (7,201); Richmond, VA
01/29/2014; 7:00 pm, TCN		at Dayton	W 60–57	14–6 (4–2)	UD Arena (12,083); Dayton, OH
02/01/2014; 6:00 pm, CBSSN		No. 21 Massachusetts	W 73–68	15–6 (5–2)	Hagan Arena (4,200); Philadelphia, PA
02/05/2014; 7:00 pm, TCN		No. 13 Saint Louis	L 49–65	15–7 (5–3)	Hagan Arena (4,076); Philadelphia, PA
02/08/2014; 8:00 pm, CBSSN		VCU	W 69–62	16–7 (6–3)	Hagan Arena (4,200); Philadelphia, PA
02/15/2014; 11:00 am, ESPNU		at La Salle	W 75–64	17–7 (7–3)	Tom Gola Arena (3,041); Philadelphia, PA
02/19/2014; 7:00 pm, CSNPHI		at Rhode Island	W 57–54	18–7 (8–3)	Ryan Center (4,712); Kingston, RI
02/22/2014; 2:00 pm		Fordham	W 87–72	19–7 (9–3)	Hagan Arena (4,200); Philadelphia, PA
02/25/2014; 7:00 pm, CBSSN		Dayton	W 79–53	20–7 (10–3)	Hagan Arena (4,051); Philadelphia, PA
03/01/2014; 3:00 pm, NBCSN		at St. Bonaventure	W 83–74	21–7 (11–3)	Reilly Center (3,975); Olean, NY
03/05/2014; 7:00 pm, CSNPHI		at George Washington	L 71–76	21–8 (11–4)	Smith Center (4,228); Washington, D.C.
03/09/2014; 4:00 pm, CBSSN		La Salle	L 63–71	21–9 (11–5)	Hagan Arena (4,200); Philadelphia, PA
Atlantic 10 tournament
03/14/2014; 2:30 pm, NBCSN		vs. Dayton; Quarterfinals	W 70–67	22–9	Barclays Center (7,308); Brooklyn, NY
03/15/2014; 2:30 pm, CBSSN		vs. St. Bonaventure; Semifinals	W 67–48	23–9	Barclays Center (10,133); Brooklyn, NY
03/16/2014; 1:00 pm, CBS		vs. No. 23 VCU; Championship	W 65–61	24–9	Barclays Center (8,886); Brooklyn, NY
NCAA tournament
03/20/2014*; 6:55 pm, TBS	No. (10 E)	vs. No. 18 (7 E) UConn; Second round	L 81–89 ^{OT}	24–10	First Niagara Center (18,706); Buffalo, NY
*Non-conference game. ^{#}Rankings from AP Poll. (#) Tournament seedings in parentheses. All times are in Eastern Time. (#) during NCAA Tournament denotes seed within region E=East.
