= 2013–14 George Mason Patriots men's basketball team =

American college basketball season

2013–14 George Mason Patriots men's basketball
- Conference: Atlantic 10 Conference
- Record: 11–20 (4–12 A-10)
- Head coach: Paul Hewitt
- Assistant coaches: Roland Houston; Eric Skeeters; Chris Kreider
- Home arena: Patriot Center

2013–14 Atlantic 10 men's basketball standings
	Conf.				Overall
Team	W		L	PCT	W		L	PCT
No. 25 Saint Louis	13	–	3	.813	27	–	7	.794
No. 24 VCU	12	–	4	.750	26	–	9	.743
George Washington	11	–	5	.688	24	–	9	.727
Saint Joseph's †	11	–	5	.688	24	–	10	.706
UMass	10	–	6	.625	24	–	9	.727
Dayton	10	–	6	.625	26	–	11	.703
Richmond	8	–	8	.500	19	–	14	.576
La Salle	7	–	9	.438	15	–	16	.484
St. Bonaventure	6	–	10	.375	18	–	15	.545
Rhode Island	5	–	11	.313	14	–	18	.438
Duquesne	5	–	11	.313	13	–	17	.433
George Mason	4	–	12	.250	11	–	20	.355
Fordham	2	–	14	.125	10	–	21	.323
† 2014 A10 Tournament winner Rankings from AP poll

The 2013–14 George Mason Patriots men's basketball team represented George Mason University during the 2013–14 NCAA Division I men's basketball season. This was the 48th season for the program. The Patriots, led by third year head coach Paul Hewitt, played their inaugural season in the Atlantic 10 Conference (A-10), after spending the past 28 years in the Colonial Athletic Association (CAA). They finished the season 11–20, 4–12 in A-10 play to finish in 12th place. They lost in the first round of the A-10 tournament to Fordham.

== Offseason ==
=== Departures ===
Name	Number	Pos.	Height	Weight	Year	Hometown	Notes
Paris Bennett	1	F	6'6"	226	RS Junior	Elizabeth, NJ	Graduate transfer
Bryce Lewis	25	G	5'9"	175	Senior	Union, NJ	Graduated
Vertrail Vaughns	11	G	6'2"	184	RS Junior	Mesquite, TX	Transferred to North Texas

== Roster ==
2013–14 George Mason Patriots men's basketball team
Players
Coaches

Pos.	#	Name	Height	Weight	Year	Previous school	Hometown
G	0	Bryon Allen	6 ft 3 in (1.91 m)	202 lb (92 kg)	Sr	St. Thomas More	Largo, MD
F	5	Jonathan Arledge	6 ft 9 in (2.06 m)	236 lb (107 kg)	Sr	KIMA	Silver Spring, MD
F/C	4	Erik Copes	6 ft 8 in (2.03 m)	250 lb (113 kg)	Jr	Imhotep Charter	Philadelphia, PA
G	13	Corey Edwards	5 ft 11 in (1.8 m)	174 lb (79 kg)	Jr	Christ the King	Middle Village, NY
F	12	Vaughn Gray	6 ft 5 in (1.96 m)	195 lb (88 kg)	Jr	St. Benedict's	Elmwood Park, NJ
F	40	Marko Gujaničić	6 ft 8 in (2.03 m)	224 lb (102 kg)	So	Stoneridge Prep	Cacak, Serbia
G	3	Patrick Holloway	6 ft 1 in (1.85 m)	163 lb (74 kg)	So	Paul VI	Stafford, VA
F	20	Jalen Jenkins	6 ft 7 in (2.01 m)	238 lb (108 kg)	RS Fr	Cardinal Hayes	Yonkers, NY
G	22	Marquise Moore	6 ft 1 in (1.85 m)	195 lb (88 kg)	Fr	Saint Thomas More	Queens, NY
F	14	Anali Okoloji	6 ft 8 in (2.03 m)	214 lb (97 kg)	Jr	Impact Academy	Brooklyn, NY
F	25	Julian Royal	6 ft 8 in (2.03 m)	237 lb (108 kg)	Jr	Milton	Alpharetta, GA
F	30	Michael Rudy	6 ft 7 in (2.01 m)	220 lb (100 kg)	So	Saint Thomas More	Falls Church, VA
F	2	Johnnie Williams	6 ft 8 in (2.03 m)	260 lb (118 kg)	RS Sr	Briarcrest Christian	Memphis, TN
G	10	Sherrod Wright	6 ft 4 in (1.93 m)	202 lb (92 kg)	RS Sr	Mount Vernon	Mount Vernon, NY

Head coach

- Paul Hewitt (St. John Fisher)

Assistant coach(es)

- Chris Kreider (Lebanon Valley)
- Roland Houston (Rhode Island)
- Eric Skeeters (Coppin State)

Legend

- (C) Team captain
- (S) Suspended
- (I) Ineligible
- (W) Walk-on
- Injured
- Current redshirt

Roster
Last update: 2013-07-06

== Stats ==
Player	GP	GS	MPG	FG%	3FG%	FT%	RPG	APG	SPG	BPG	PPG
Sherrod Wright	31	30	30.9	.448	.318	.704	3.2	0.8	0.2	0.8	15.6
Bryon Allen	29	29	34.0	.451	.391	.836	3.9	3.0	1.0	0.0	15.4
Patrick Holloway	31	3	20.9	.400	.411	.706	1.5	0.7	0.4	0.0	8.7
Jalen Jenkins	31	17	22.8	.490	.000	.693	6.0	1.4	0.8	1.0	7.2
Marko Gujanicic	31	13	18.9	.410	.208	.794	3.2	0.8	0.4	0.1	6.2
Johnny Williams	26	17	19.9	.482	.000	.623	3.6	0.5	0.4	0.5	5.5
Erik Copes	25	14	20.6	.581	.000	.370	5.6	0.3	1.1	0.5	4.4
Marquise Moore	26	19	22.2	.404	.000	.784	2.4	2.7	0.6	0.5	3.9
Corey Edwards	25	12	13.5	.297	.273	.808	1.6	1.4	0.4	0.0	2.7
Vaughn Gray	19	0	9.6	.380	.370	.375	1.1	0.3	0.2	0.1	2.7
Anali Okoloji	17	0	8.0	.333	.667	.536	1.8	0.2	0.4	0.1	2.1
Jonathan Arledge	1	1	25.0	.000	.000	.500	3.0	0.0	1.0	1.0	2.0

== Schedule and results ==
Date time, TV	Rank^{#}	Opponent^{#}	Result	Record	High points	High rebounds	High assists	Site (attendance) city, state
Non-conference regular season
November 8, 2013*; 7:00 pm		American	W 63–60	1–0	20 – Allen	6 – Wright	3 – Allen	Patriot Center (6,602); Fairfax, VA
November 12, 2013*; 8:00 pm		at Lamar	W 68–54	2–0	13 – Holloway, Wright	10 – Gujanicic	5 – Allen, Moore	Montagne Center (3,984); Beaumont, TX
November 16, 2013*; 4:00 pm		Northern Iowa	W 76–70	3–0	23 – Wright	10 – Gujanicic	4 – Gujanicic	Patriot Center (4,367); Fairfax, VA
November 19, 2013*; 7:00 pm		St. Francis (PA)	W 58–46	4–0	14 – Wright	8 – Gujanicic	2 – Edwards, Holloway	Patriot Center (4,013); Fairfax, VA
November 23, 2013*; 2:00 pm		at Iona	L 73–89	4–1	12 – Gujanicic, Wright	6 – Gujanicic	5 – Allen	Hynes Athletic Center (1,738); New Rochelle, NY
November 26, 2013*; 8:00 pm		at Princeton	L 66–71	4–2	27 – Wright	8 – Wright	6 – Allen	Jadwin Gymnasium (1,672); Princeton, NJ
November 30, 2013*; 4:00 pm, MASN		Rhode Island	W 61–54	5–2	16 – Wright	11 – Jenkins	6 – Allen	Patriot Center (4,014); Fairfax, VA
December 4, 2013*; 7:00 pm, MASN		South Florida	L 66–68	5–3	22 – Wright	6 – Copes, Williams	2 – Allen, Wright	Patriot Center (4,587); Fairfax, VA
December 8, 2013*; 1:00 pm		vs. Oklahoma; BB&T Classic Basketball Tournament	L 66–81	5–4	15 – Allen	6 – Copes	3 – Allen, Edwards	Verizon Center (9,183); Washington, D.C.
December 22, 2013*; 5:30 pm, ESPNU		vs. No. 17 Iowa State; Diamond Head Classic Quarterfinals	L 67–79	5–5	19 – Holloway	5 – Allen	4 – Allen	Stan Sheriff Center (8,694); Honolulu, HI
December 23, 2013*; 2:30 pm, ESPNU		vs. Oregon State; Diamond Head Classic Consolation 2nd round	L 54–58	5–6	15 – Allen	6 – Jenkins, Okoloji	4 – Wright	Stan Sheriff Center (7,140); Honolulu, HI
December 25, 2013*; 1:30 pm, ESPN3		vs. Saint Mary's; Diamond Head Classic 7th place game	W 65–63	6–6	15 – Allen, Holloway	5 – Jenkins	2 – Gujanicic	Stan Sheriff Center (1,535); Honolulu, HI
January 2, 2014*; 7:30 pm, NBCSN		Penn	W 80–77	7–6	24 – Allen	6 – Jenkins	2 – Allen, Wright	Patriot Center (3,531); Fairfax, VA
January 4, 2014*; 7:00 pm		at Old Dominion	L 66–71	7–7	25 – Wright	10 – Williams	4 – Allen	Ted Constant Convocation Center (7,511); Norfolk, VA
Atlantic 10 regular season
January 9, 2014; 7:00 pm, CBSSN		at VCU	L 57–71	7–8 (0–1)	13 – Allen	12 – Jenkins	2 – Allen, Moore	Stuart C. Siegel Center (7,741); Richmond, VA
January 11, 2014; 8:00 pm, CBSSN		Saint Joseph's	L 80–84	7–9 (0–2)	20 – Allen, Jenkins	7 – Jenkins	4 – Allen	Patriot Center (5,027); Fairfax, VA
January 15, 2014; 7:00 pm, MASN		No. 16 Massachusetts	L 87–88	7–10 (0–3)	26 – Wright	9 – Jenkins	4 – Allen, Moore	Patriot Center (4,014); Fairfax, VA
January 18, 2014; 12:30 pm, NBCSN		at Rhode Island	L 69–71 ^{OT}	7–11 (0–4)	12 – Wright	9 – Jenkins	3 – Allen, Jenkins	Ryan Center (4,810); Kingston, RI
January 22, 2014; 7:00 pm		at Fordham	L 70–76	7–12 (0–5)	21 – Wright	11 – Jenkins	3 – Edwards	Rose Hill Gymnasium (1,352); Bronx, NY
January 25, 2014; 12:30 pm, NBCSN		George Washington	L 69–75	7–13 (0–6)	18 – Williams	11 – Jenkins	7 – Moore	Patriot Center (7,714); Fairfax, VA
February 1, 2014; 2:30 pm, NBCSN		at No. 19 Saint Louis	L 75–81 ^{OT}	7–14 (0–7)	30 – Allen	9 – Copes	7 – Moore	Chaifetz Arena (9,148); St. Louis, MO
February 5, 2014; 7:00 pm, MASN		Dayton	L 67–84	7–15 (0–8)	18 – Wright	9 – Copes	2 – Allen, Edwards	Patriot Center (3,863); Fairfax, VA
February 8, 2014; 2:00 pm		at Duquesne	W 74–68	8–15 (1–8)	23 – Wright	6 – Copes, Jenkins	4 – Moore	A.J. Palumbo Center (2,923); Pittsburgh, PA
February 12, 2014; 7:00 pm		at Massachusetts	W 91–80	9–15 (2–8)	22 – Wright	15 – Copes	5 – Moore	Mullins Center (5,322); Amherst, MA
February 15, 2014; 6:00 pm, MASN		St. Bonaventure	L 73–85	9–16 (2–9)	26 – Allen	8 – Jenkins	6 – Moore	Patriot Center (7,838); Fairfax, VA
February 19, 2014; 7:00 pm, NBCSN		No. 10 Saint Louis	L 85–89 ^{OT}	9–17 (2–10)	34 – Wright	8 – Jenkins	4 – Allen	Patriot Center (4,057); Fairfax, VA
February 26, 2014; 7:00 pm, MASN		Richmond	W 69–60	10–17 (3–10) (3–10)	19 – Wright	9 – Jenkins	5 – Jenkins	Patriot Center (4,011); Fairfax, VA
March 2, 2014; 2:00 pm, NBCSN		at George Washington	L 58–66	10–18 (3–11)	16 – Wright	12 – Copes	3 – Allen, Jenkins	Smith Center (4,307); Washington, D.C.
March 6, 2014; 8:00 pm, NBCSN		at La Salle	W 59–57	11–18 (4–11)	15 – Gujanicic	10 – Copes	4 – Jenkins	Tom Gola Arena (1,503); Philadelphia, PA
March 8, 2014; 7:00 pm, MASN		Duquesne	L 69–81	11–19 (4–12)	25 – Wright	9 – Copes	4 – Jenkins, Moore	Patriot Center (5,724); Fairfax, VA
Atlantic 10 tournament
March 12, 2014; 7:00 pm	(12)	vs. (13) Fordham; First round	L 67–70	11–20	22 – Allen	11 – Copes	3 – Allen	Barclays Center (3,842); Brooklyn, NY
*Non-conference game. ^{#}Rankings from AP Poll. (#) Tournament seedings in parentheses. All times are in Eastern Time.

== Recruiting ==
The following is a list of players signed for the 2014–15 season:

College recruiting information
Name	Hometown	School	Height	Weight	Commit date
Therence Mayimba; F	Hagerstown, MD	St. James School	6 ft 6 in (1.98 m)	190 lb (86 kg)	Oct 15, 2013
Therence Mayimba; F	Recruit ratings: Scout: Rivals: (70)				
Isaiah Jackson; F	Gainesville, FL	The Villages Charter High School	6 ft 6 in (1.98 m)	200 lb (91 kg)	Jan 21, 2014
Isaiah Jackson; F	Recruit ratings: Scout: Rivals: (69)				
Eric Lockett; F	Atlanta, GA	Whitefield Academy	6 ft 5 in (1.96 m)	180 lb (82 kg)	Oct 6, 2013
Eric Lockett; F	Recruit ratings: Scout: Rivals: (69)				
Trey Porter; C	Dumfries, VA	Potomac Senior	6 ft 10 in (2.08 m)	190 lb (86 kg)	Oct 12, 2013
Trey Porter; C	Recruit ratings: No ratings found				
Overall recruit ranking:
Note: In many cases, Scout, Rivals, 247Sports, On3, and ESPN may conflict in their listings of height and weight.; In these cases, the average was taken. ESPN grades are on a 100-point scale.; Sources: "ESPN". ESPN.; "2014 Team Ranking". Rivals.
