= 2013–14 VCU Rams men's basketball team =

American college basketball season

2013–14 VCU Rams men's basketball
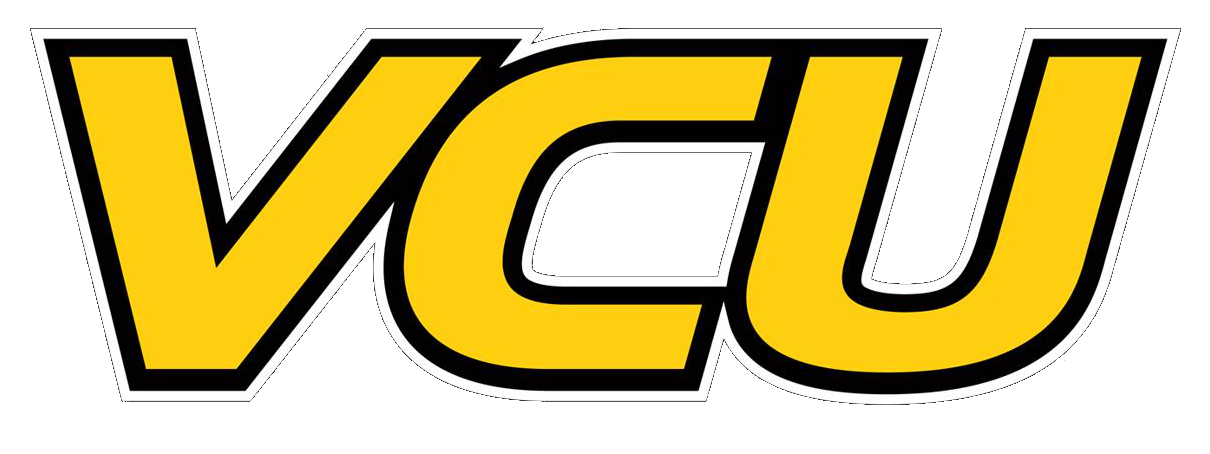

NCAA tournament, round of 64
- Conference: Atlantic 10 Conference

Ranking
- AP: No. 24
- Record: 26–9 (12–4 A10)
- Head coach: Shaka Smart (5th season)
- Assistant coaches: Mike Rhoades; Jeremy Ballard; Mike Morell
- Home arena: Stuart C. Siegel Center

2013–14 Atlantic 10 men's basketball standings
| | Conf. | | | | Overall |
| Team | W | | L | PCT | W | | L | PCT |
|---|---|---|---|---|---|---|---|---|
| No. 25 Saint Louis | 13 | – | 3 | .813 | 27 | – | 7 | .794 |
| No. 24 VCU | 12 | – | 4 | .750 | 26 | – | 9 | .743 |
| George Washington | 11 | – | 5 | .688 | 24 | – | 9 | .727 |
| Saint Joseph's † | 11 | – | 5 | .688 | 24 | – | 10 | .706 |
| UMass | 10 | – | 6 | .625 | 24 | – | 9 | .727 |
| Dayton | 10 | – | 6 | .625 | 26 | – | 11 | .703 |
| Richmond | 8 | – | 8 | .500 | 19 | – | 14 | .576 |
| La Salle | 7 | – | 9 | .438 | 15 | – | 16 | .484 |
| St. Bonaventure | 6 | – | 10 | .375 | 18 | – | 15 | .545 |
| Rhode Island | 5 | – | 11 | .313 | 14 | – | 18 | .438 |
| Duquesne | 5 | – | 11 | .313 | 13 | – | 17 | .433 |
| George Mason | 4 | – | 12 | .250 | 11 | – | 20 | .355 |
| Fordham | 2 | – | 14 | .125 | 10 | – | 21 | .323 |
† 2014 A10 Tournament winner Rankings from AP poll

The 2013–14 VCU Rams men's basketball team represented Virginia Commonwealth University during the 2013–14 NCAA Division I men's basketball season. It was the 46th season of the university fielding a men's basketball program. Led by fifth-year head coach Shaka Smart, they played their home games at the Stuart C. Siegel Center. It was the second season for the Rams playing in the Atlantic 10 Conference. They finished the season 26–9, 12–4 in A-10 play to finish in second place. They advanced to the championship game of the A-10 tournament where they lost to Saint Joseph's. They received an at-large bid to the NCAA tournament where they lost in the second round to Stephen F. Austin.

== 2013–14 incoming team members ==
=== 2013–14 team recruits ===
College recruiting information
| Name | Hometown | School | Height | Weight | Commit date |
|---|---|---|---|---|---|
| JeQuan Lewis; PG | Dickson, TN | Dickson County High School | 6 ft 1 in (1.85 m) | 175 lb (79 kg) | Feb 8, 2012 |
| JeQuan Lewis; PG | Recruit ratings: Scout: Rivals: (80) | | | | |
| Douglas Brooks; SG | Lake Wales, FL | Lake Wales High School | 6 ft 3 in (1.91 m) | 165 lb (75 kg) | Apr 2, 2013 |
| Douglas Brooks; SG | Recruit ratings: Scout: Rivals: (76) | | | | |
| Jairus Lyles; SG | Silver Spring, MD | DeMatha Catholic | 6 ft 1 in (1.85 m) | 165 lb (75 kg) | Jul 1, 2012 |
| Jairus Lyles; SG | Recruit ratings: Scout: Rivals: (74) | | | | |
| Antravious Simmons; C | Miami, FL | South Miami High School | 6 ft 9 in (2.06 m) | 220 lb (100 kg) | Sep 1, 2012 |
| Antravious Simmons; C | Recruit ratings: Scout: Rivals: (66) | | | | |
Overall recruit ranking:
Note: In many cases, Scout, Rivals, 247Sports, On3, and ESPN may conflict in their listings of height and weight.; In these cases, the average was taken. ESPN grades are on a 100-point scale.; Sources: "VCU 2013 Basketball Commitments". Rivals.; "2013 VCU Basketball Commits". Scout.; "VCU 2013 Player Commits". ESPN.; "Scout.com Team Recruiting Rankings". Scout.; "2013 Team Ranking". Rivals.

== Roster ==
2013–14 VCU Rams men's basketball team
Players
Coaches

| Pos. | # | Name | Height | Weight | Year | Hometown |
|---|---|---|---|---|---|---|
| G | 0 | Jairus Lyles | 6 ft 2 in (1.88 m) | 175 lb (79 kg) | Fr | Washington, D.C. |
| G | 1 | JeQuan Lewis | 6 ft 1 in (1.85 m) | 175 lb (79 kg) | Fr | Dickson, TN |
| G | 2 | Brianté Weber | 6 ft 2 in (1.88 m) | 165 lb (75 kg) | Jr | Chesapeake, VA |
| F | 4 | Terrance Shannon | 6 ft 8 in (2.03 m) | 240 lb (109 kg) | RS Sr | Forsyth, GA |
| G | 5 | Doug Brooks | 6 ft 3 in (1.91 m) | 180 lb (82 kg) | Fr | Lake Wales, FL |
| G | 11 | Rob Brandenberg | 6 ft 2 in (1.88 m) | 190 lb (86 kg) | Sr | Gahanna, OH |
| F | 12 | Mo Alie-Cox | 6 ft 6 in (1.98 m) | 250 lb (113 kg) | RS Fr | Middleburg, VA |
| G | 14 | Torey Burston | 5 ft 8 in (1.73 m) | 165 lb (75 kg) | RS Fr | Richmond, VA |
| F | 15 | Juvonte Reddic | 6 ft 9 in (2.06 m) | 250 lb (113 kg) | Sr | Winston-Salem, NC |
| G | 20 | Jordan Burgess | 6 ft 5 in (1.96 m) | 215 lb (98 kg) | RS Fr | Midlothian, VA |
| G | 21 | Treveon Graham | 6 ft 6 in (1.98 m) | 220 lb (100 kg) | Jr | Washington, D.C. |
| F | 23 | Jarred Guest | 6 ft 8 in (2.03 m) | 225 lb (102 kg) | Jr | Columbia, SC |
| F | 25 | Antravious Simmons | 6 ft 9 in (2.06 m) | 250 lb (113 kg) | Fr | Miami, FL |
| G | 32 | Melvin Johnson | 6 ft 3 in (1.91 m) | 195 lb (88 kg) | So | Bronx, NY |
| F | 40 | Emerson Burk (W) | 6 ft 9 in (2.06 m) | 215 lb (98 kg) | Fr | Chesapeake, VA |

Head coach

- Shaka Smart (Kenyon)

Assistant coach(es)

- Mike Rhoades (Lebanon Valley)
- Jeremy Ballard (Colgate)
- Mike Morell (Milligan)

Legend

- (C) Team captain
- (S) Suspended
- (I) Ineligible
- (W) Walk-on
- Injured
- Current redshirt

Roster
Last update: September 25, 2013

== Rankings ==
Legend: ██ Increase in ranking. ██ Decrease in ranking.
| Poll | Pre | Wk 2 | Wk 3 | Wk 4 | Wk 5 | Wk 6 | Wk 7 | Wk 8 | Wk 9 | Wk 10 | Wk 11 | Wk 12 | Wk 13 | Wk 14 | Wk 15 | Wk 16 | Wk 17 | Wk 18 | Wk 19 | Wk 20 | Final |
|---|---|---|---|---|---|---|---|---|---|---|---|---|---|---|---|---|---|---|---|---|---|
| AP | 14 | 14 | 10 | N/A | N/A | N/A | N/A | N/A | N/A | N/A | N/A | N/A | N/A | N/A | N/A | N/A | N/A | N/A | 23 | 24 | N/A |
| Coaches' | 15 | 14 | 10 | 24 | N/A | N/A | N/A | N/A | N/A | N/A | N/A | N/A | N/A | N/A | N/A | N/A | N/A | N/A | 25 | 25 | N/A |

== Schedule ==
| Date time, TV | Rank^{#} | Opponent^{#} | Result | Record | Site (attendance) city, state |
Exhibition
| November 2*; 7:30 pm | No. 14 | California (PA) | W 92–54 | – | Stuart C. Siegel Center (7,741); Richmond, VA |
Non-conference regular season
| November 8*; 7:00 pm, MASN | No. 14 | Illinois State | W 96–58 | 1–0 | Stuart C. Siegel Center (7,741); Richmond, VA |
| November 12*; 7:00 pm, ESPN2 | No. 14 | at No. 25 Virginia | W 59–56 | 2–0 | John Paul Jones Arena (13,881); Charlottesville, VA |
| November 16*; 7:00 pm, CSNMA+ | No. 14 | Winthrop | W 92–71 | 3–0 | Stuart C. Siegel Center (7,741); Richmond, VA |
| November 21*; 7:30 pm, ESPNU | No. 10 | vs. Florida State; Puerto Rico Tip-Off First Round | L 67–85 | 3–1 | Roberto Clemente Coliseum (4,952); San Juan, PR |
| November 22*; 7:30 pm, ESPNU | No. 10 | vs. Long Beach State; Puerto Rico Tip-Off consolation round | W 73–67 | 4–1 | Roberto Clemente Coliseum (5,835); San Juan, PR |
| November 24*; 2:00 pm, ESPNU | No. 10 | vs. Georgetown; Puerto Rico Tip-Off 5th place game | L 80–84 | 4–2 | Roberto Clemente Coliseum (N/A); San Juan, PR |
| November 29*; 7:00 pm, WTVR/CSNMA+ | | Northeastern | W 79–66 | 5–2 | Stuart C. Siegel Center (7,741); Richmond, VA |
| December 1*; 5:00 pm, CSNMA/SNY | | at Belmont | W 81–68 | 6–2 | Curb Event Center (4,811); Nashville, TN |
| December 5*; 7:00 pm, WTVR 6.3/CSNMA | | Eastern Kentucky | W 71–68 ^{OT} | 7–2 | Stuart C. Siegel Center (7,741); Richmond, VA |
| December 8*; 1:30 pm, CSNMA | | Old Dominion; Rivalry | W 69–48 | 8–2 | Stuart C. Siegel Center (7,741); Richmond, VA |
| December 14*; 12:00 pm, ESPNU | | at Northern Iowa | L 68–77 | 8–3 | McLeod Center (5,890); Cedar Falls, IA |
| December 17*; 7:00 pm, WTVR 6.3 | | Wofford | W 72–57 | 9–3 | Stuart C. Siegel Center (7,741); Richmond, VA |
| December 21*; 5:30 pm, NBCSN | | vs. Virginia Tech; Governor's Invitational | W 82–52 | 10–3 | Richmond Coliseum (10,605); Richmond, VA |
| December 28*; 7:30 pm, FS2 | | vs. Boston College; Brooklyn Hoops Winter Festival | W 69–50 | 11–3 | Barclays Center (N/A); Brooklyn, NY |
| January 3*; 9:00 pm, WTVR 6.3/CSNMA+ | | Stony Brook | W 81–63 | 12–3 | Stuart C. Siegel Center (7,741); Richmond, VA |
Conference regular season
| January 9; 7:00 pm, CBSSN | | George Mason; Rivalry | W 71–57 | 13–3 (1–0) | Stuart C. Siegel Center (7,741); Richmond, VA |
| January 14; 7:00 pm, CBSSN | | at George Washington | L 66–76 | 13–4 (1–1) | Smith Center (4,874); Washington, DC |
| January 18; 4:00 pm, CBSSN | | Duquesne | W 80–65 | 14–4 (2–1) | Stuart C. Siegel Center (7,741); Richmond, VA |
| January 22; 7:00 pm, CBSSN | | at Dayton | W 80–66 | 15–4 (3–1) | UD Arena (12,512); Dayton, OH |
| January 25; 12:00 pm, ESPN2 | | at La Salle | W 97–87 ^{2OT} | 16–4 (4–1) | Tom Gola Arena (3,400); Philadelphia, PA |
| January 29; 7:00 pm, WTVR 6.3 | | Fordham | W 76–60 | 17–4 (5–1) | Stuart C. Siegel Center (7,741); Richmond, VA |
| February 1; 12:00 pm, ESPN2 | | Richmond; Capital City Classic | W 80–71 | 18–4 (6–1) | Stuart C. Siegel Center (7,741); Richmond, VA |
| February 6; 7:00 pm, CBSSN | | Rhode Island | W 65–50 | 19–4 (7–1) | Stuart C. Siegel Center (7,741); Richmond, VA |
| February 8; 8:00 pm, CBSSN | | at Saint Joseph's | L 62–69 | 19–5 (7–2) | Hagan Arena (4,200); Philadelphia, PA |
| February 12; 7:00 pm, NBCSN | | George Washington | W 92–75 | 20–5 (8–2) | Stuart C. Siegel Center (7,741); Richmond, VA |
| February 15; 2:00 pm, ESPN | | at No. 12 Saint Louis | L 62–64 | 20–6 (8–3) | Chaifetz Arena (10,639); Saint Louis, MO |
| February 21; 7:00 pm, ESPN2 | | at Massachusetts | L 75–80 | 20–7 (8–4) | Mullins Center (9,493); Amherst, MA |
| February 27; 7:00 pm, CBSSN | | at Fordham | W 85–66 | 21–7 (9–4) | Rose Hill Gymnasium (2,253); Bronx. NY |
| March 1; 6:00 pm, ESPN2 | | No. 10 Saint Louis | W 67–56 | 22–7 (10–4) | Stuart C. Siegel Center (7,741); Richmond, VA |
| March 6; 9:00 pm, CBSSN | | at Richmond; Capital City Classic | W 56–50 | 23–7 (11–4) | Robins Center (7,201); Richmond, VA |
| March 8; 7:00 pm, SNY | | St. Bonaventure | W 86–67 | 24–7 (12–4) | Stuart C. Siegel Center (7,741); Richmond, VA |
Atlantic 10 tournament
| March 14; 6:30 pm, NBCSN | No. 23 | vs. Richmond; Quarterfinals | W 71–53 | 25–7 | Barclays Center (8,755); Brooklyn, NY |
| March 15; 4:00 pm, CBSSN | No. 23 | vs. George Washington; Semifinals | W 74–55 | 26–7 | Barclays Center (10,133); Brooklyn, NY |
| March 16; 1:00 pm, CBS | No. 23 | vs. St. Joseph's; Championship | L 61–65 | 26-8 | Barclays Center (8,886); Brooklyn, NY |
NCAA tournament
| March 21*; 7:27 pm, TruTV | No. 24 (S 5) | vs. (S 12) Stephen F. Austin; Second round | L 75–77 ^{OT} | 26–9 | Viejas Arena (11,488); San Diego, CA |
*Non-conference game. ^{#}Rankings from AP poll. (#) Tournament seedings in parentheses. All times are in Eastern Time. (#) during NCAA Tournament is seed with Region S=South.
