= 2013–14 Saint Louis Billikens men's basketball team =

American college basketball season

2013–14 Saint Louis Billikens men's basketball
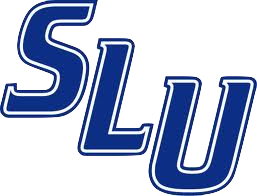

Atlantic 10 regular season champions

NCAA tournament, Round of 32
- Conference: Atlantic 10 Conference

Ranking
- Coaches: No. 25
- AP: No. 25
- Record: 27–7 (13–3 A-10)
- Head coach: Jim Crews (1st season)
- Assistant coaches: Tanner Bronson; Calbert Cheaney; Jim Platt
- Home arena: Chaifetz Arena

2013–14 Atlantic 10 men's basketball standings
	Conf.				Overall
Team	W		L	PCT	W		L	PCT
No. 25 Saint Louis	13	–	3	.813	27	–	7	.794
No. 24 VCU	12	–	4	.750	26	–	9	.743
George Washington	11	–	5	.688	24	–	9	.727
Saint Joseph's †	11	–	5	.688	24	–	10	.706
UMass	10	–	6	.625	24	–	9	.727
Dayton	10	–	6	.625	26	–	11	.703
Richmond	8	–	8	.500	19	–	14	.576
La Salle	7	–	9	.438	15	–	16	.484
St. Bonaventure	6	–	10	.375	18	–	15	.545
Rhode Island	5	–	11	.313	14	–	18	.438
Duquesne	5	–	11	.313	13	–	17	.433
George Mason	4	–	12	.250	11	–	20	.355
Fordham	2	–	14	.125	10	–	21	.323
† 2014 A10 Tournament winner Rankings from AP poll

The 2013–14 Saint Louis Billikens men's basketball team represented Saint Louis University in the 2013–14 NCAA Division I men's basketball season. The Billikens were led by their head coach Jim Crews who was in his first full year season at Saint Louis. The team played their home games at Chaifetz Arena. They were a member of the Atlantic 10 Conference. They finished the season 27–7, 13–3 in A-10 play to win the regular season conference championship. They lost in the quarterfinals of the A-10 tournament to St. Bonaventure. They received an at-large bid to the NCAA tournament where they defeated NC State in the first round before losing in the second round to Louisville.

== Roster ==
2013–14 Saint Louis Billikens men's basketball team
Players
Coaches

Pos.	#	Name	Height	Weight	Year	Previous school	Hometown
F	1	Grandy Glaze	6 ft 6 in (1.98 m)	235 lb (107 kg)	Jr	Notre Dame Prep	Toronto, ON
G	2	Austin McBroom	5 ft 9 in (1.75 m)	165 lb (75 kg)	So	Campbell Hall	North Hollywood, CA
G	3	Achraf Yacoubou	6 ft 4 in (1.93 m)	210 lb (95 kg)	Jr	Long Island Lutheran; Villanova	Bronx, NY
G	5	Jordair Jett	6 ft 1 in (1.85 m)	215 lb (98 kg)	Sr	Notre Dame Prep	St. Paul, MN
G	10	Joey LePak	6 ft 1 in (1.85 m)	170 lb (77 kg)	So	Cedarburg High School	Cedarburg, WI
G	11	Mike McCall Jr.	6 ft 0 in (1.83 m)	180 lb (82 kg)	Sr	Foreman	Chicago, IL
F	15	Tanner Lancona	6 ft 8 in (2.03 m)	230 lb (104 kg)	Fr	Tesoro	Trabuco Canyon, CA
F	21	Dwayne Evans	6 ft 5 in (1.96 m)	230 lb (104 kg)	Sr	Neuqua Valley	Bolingbrook, IL
G	22	Austin Eagleton	6 ft 3 in (1.91 m)	200 lb (91 kg)	Fr	Sacred Heart-Griffin	Springfield, IL
G/F	32	Mike Crawford	6 ft 5 in (1.96 m)	200 lb (91 kg)	Fr	Tipton	Tipton, IN
F	30	Jake Barnett	6 ft 5 in (1.96 m)	195 lb (88 kg)	Sr	Wauwatosa East	Wauwatosa, WI
G	33	Royce Simpson	6 ft 2 in (1.88 m)	180 lb (82 kg)	Fr	Marist	Chicago, IL
F	35	Reggie Agbeko	6 ft 7 in (2.01 m)	240 lb (109 kg)	Fr	South Kent School	Buffalo, NY
F	51	Robert Loe	6 ft 11 in (2.11 m)	245 lb (111 kg)	Sr	Westlake Boys High School	Auckland, NZ
C	54	John Manning	6 ft 11 in (2.11 m)	240 lb (109 kg)	Jr	Chantilly	Chantilly, VA

Head coach

- Jim Crews (Indiana)

Assistant coach(es)

- Calbert Cheaney (Indiana)
- Tanner Bronson (Wisconsin)
- Jim Platt (Concordia–Chicago)

Legend

- (C) Team captain
- (S) Suspended
- (I) Ineligible
- (W) Walk-on
- Injured
- Current redshirt

Roster
Last update: 13 October 2013

== Schedule ==
Date time, TV	Rank^{#}	Opponent^{#}	Result	Record	Site (attendance) city, state
Exhibition
10/31/2013*; 7:00 pm		Fontbonne	W 94–38	–	Chaifetz Arena (N/A); St. Louis, MO
Regular season
11/08/2013*; 7:30 pm, FSMW		SE Missouri State	W 87–64	1–0	Chaifetz Arena (7,714); St. Louis, MO
11/13/2013*; 7:00 pm, FSMW		at SIU Edwardsville	W 82–58	2–0	Vadalabene Center (4,007); Edwardsville, IL
11/16/2013*; 7:00 pm		at Southern Illinois	W 76–67	3–0	SIU Arena (5,640); Carbondale, IL
11/21/2013*; 7:00 pm, FSMW+		Oral Roberts; Cancún Challenge	W 72–55	4–0	Chaifetz Arena (6,143); St. Louis, MO
11/23/2013*; 7:00 pm, FSMW+		Bowling Green; Cancún Challenge	W 74–47	5–0	Chaifetz Arena (6,741); St. Louis, MO
11/26/2013*; 7:30 pm, CBSSN		vs. No. 10 Wisconsin; Cancún Challenge semifinals	L 57–63	5–1	Hard Rock Hotel Rivera Maya (934); Cancún, MX
11/27/2013*; 6:00 pm, CBSSN		vs. Old Dominion; Cancún Challenge Consolation	W 62–52	6–1	Hard Rock Hotel Rivera Maya (934); Cancún, MX
12/01/2013*; 12:00 pm, CBSSN		No. 12 Wichita State	L 65–70	6–2	Chaifetz Arena (9,031); St. Louis, MO
12/03/2013*; 7:30 pm, FSMW		Rockhurst	W 68–43	7–2	Chaifetz Arena (5,810); St. Louis, MO
12/07/2013*; 7:00 pm		at Valparaiso	W 67–65	8–2	Athletics-Recreation Center (853); Valparaiso, IN
12/14/2013*; 7:00 pm, FSMW+		Wofford	W 66–52	9–2	Chaifetz Arena (6,404); St. Louis, MO
12/18/2013*; 7:00 pm, FSMW		Indiana State	W 83–66	10–2	Chaifetz Arena (7,205); St. Louis, MO
12/21/2013*; 3:00 pm, FSMW		North Carolina A&T	W 79–57	11–2	Chaifetz Arena (8,015); St. Louis, MO
12/30/2013*; 8:00 pm, ESPNU		at Vanderbilt	W 57–49	12–2	Memorial Gymnasium (9,305); Nashville, TN
01/04/2014*; 4:30 pm, NBCSN		Yale	W 75–55	13–2	Chaifetz Arena (8,659); St. Louis, MO
01/07/2014; 6:00 pm, CBSSN		at Rhode Island	W 59–58	14–2 (1–0)	Ryan Center (4,510); Kingston, RI
01/11/2014; 10:00 am, ESPN2		at Dayton	W 67–59	15–2 (2–0)	UD Arena (12,597); Dayton, OH
01/15/2014; 7:00 pm, FSMW	No. 24	St. Bonaventure	W 66–60	16–2 (3–0)	Chaifetz Arena (8,388); St. Louis, MO
01/18/2014; 1:30 pm, NBCSN	No. 24	Fordham	W 70–48	17–2 (4–0)	Chaifetz Arena (9,265); St. Louis, MO
01/22/2014; 6:00 pm	No. 19	at Duquesne	W 76–72	18–2 (5–0)	A. J. Palumbo Center (2,274); Pittsburgh, PA
01/29/2014; 7:00 pm, FSMW	No. 19	Richmond	W 77–57	19–2 (6–0)	Chaifetz Arena (8,853); St. Louis, MO
02/01/2014; 1:30 pm, NBCSN	No. 19	George Mason	W 87–81 ^{OT}	20–2 (7–0)	Chaifetz Arena (9,148); St. Louis, MO
02/05/2014; 6:00 pm, FSMW+	No. 13	at Saint Joseph's	W 65–49	21–2 (8–0)	Hagan Arena (4,076); Philadelphia, PA
02/08/2014; 4:00 pm, ESPN2	No. 13	at La Salle	W 65–63	22–2 (9–0)	Tom Gola Arena (3,400); Philadelphia, PA
02/15/2014; 1:00 pm, ESPN	No. 12	VCU	W 64–62	23–2 (10–0)	Chaifetz Arena (10,639); St. Louis, MO
02/19/2014; 6:00 pm, NBCSN	No. 10	at George Mason	W 89–85 ^{OT}	24–2 (11–0)	Patriot Center (4,057); Fairfax, VA
02/22/2014; 7:00 pm, FSMW	No. 10	George Washington	W 66–59	25–2 (12–0)	Chaifetz Arena (10,623); St. Louis, MO
02/27/2014; 7:00 pm, NBCSN	No. 10	Duquesne	L 64–71	25–3 (12–1)	Chaifetz Arena (10,245); St. Louis, MO
03/01/2014; 5:00 pm, ESPN2	No. 10	at VCU	L 56–67	25–4 (12–2)	Stuart C. Siegel Center (7,741); Richmond, VA
03/05/2014; 8:00 pm, CBSSN	No. 17	Dayton	L 67–72	25–5 (12–3)	Chaifetz Arena (10,395); St. Louis, MO
03/08/2014; 1:00 pm, CBSSN	No. 17	at Massachusetts	W 64–62	26–5 (13–3)	Mullins Center (9,493); Amherst, MA
Atlantic 10 tournament
03/14/2014; 11:00 am, NBCSN	(1) No. 18	vs. (9) St. Bonaventure; Quarterfinals	L 68–71	26–6	Barclays Center (7,308); Brooklyn, NY
NCAA tournament
03/20/2014*; 8:20 pm, TNT	(5 MW) No. 25	vs. (12 MW) NC State; First round	W 83–80 ^{OT}	27–6	Amway Center (14,866); Orlando, FL
03/22/2014*; 1:45 pm, CBS	(5 MW) No. 25	vs. (4 MW) No. 5 Louisville; Second round	L 51–66	27–7	Amway Center (18,512); Orlando, FL
*Non-conference game. ^{#}Rankings from AP Poll. (#) Tournament seedings in parentheses. All times are in Central Time. (#) during NCAA Tournament is seed with Region MW=Midwest.

== Rankings ==
Ranking movement Legend: ██ Improvement in ranking. ██ Decrease in ranking. RV=Others receiving votes.
Poll	Pre	Wk 2	Wk 3	Wk 4	Wk 5	Wk 6	Wk 7	Wk 8	Wk 9	Wk 10	Wk 11	Wk 12	Wk 13	Wk 14	Wk 15	Wk 16	Wk 17	Wk 18	Wk 19	Wk 20	Final
AP	RV	RV	RV	NR	NR	NR	NR	NR	NR	RV	24	19	19	13	12	10	10	17	18	25	N/A
Coaches	RV	RV	RV	RV	NR	RV	NR	NR	RV	RV	RV	20	21	15	12	10	8	16	18	21	25

== Preseason ==
=== Departures ===
Name	Number	Pos.	Height	Weight	Year	Hometown	Notes
Kwamain Mitchell	3	G	5'10"	175	Senior	Milwaukee, WI	Graduated
Sean Duff	15	G	6'2"	180	Junior	St. Louis, MO	Graduated
Jared Drew	22	F	6'4"	205	Freshman	Indianapolis, IN	Transferred
Cody Ellis	24	F	6'8"	245	Senior	Perth, AUS	Graduated
Cory Remekun	32	F	6'8"	220	Senior	Dallas, TX	Graduated
