= 2014 Atlantic 10 men's basketball tournament =

- Classification: Division I
- Season: 2013–14
- Teams: 13
- Site: Barclays Center; Brooklyn, New York
- Champions: Saint Joseph's (3rd title)
- Winning coach: Phil Martelli (2nd title)
- MVP: Halil Kanačević (Saint Joseph's)
- Television: NBCSN, CBSSN, CBS

2013–14 Atlantic 10 men's basketball standings
	Conf.				Overall
Team	W		L	PCT	W		L	PCT
No. 25 Saint Louis	13	–	3	.813	27	–	7	.794
No. 24 VCU	12	–	4	.750	26	–	9	.743
George Washington	11	–	5	.688	24	–	9	.727
Saint Joseph's †	11	–	5	.688	24	–	10	.706
UMass	10	–	6	.625	24	–	9	.727
Dayton	10	–	6	.625	26	–	11	.703
Richmond	8	–	8	.500	19	–	14	.576
La Salle	7	–	9	.438	15	–	16	.484
St. Bonaventure	6	–	10	.375	18	–	15	.545
Rhode Island	5	–	11	.313	14	–	18	.438
Duquesne	5	–	11	.313	13	–	17	.433
George Mason	4	–	12	.250	11	–	20	.355
Fordham	2	–	14	.125	10	–	21	.323
† 2014 A10 Tournament winner Rankings from AP poll

The 2014 Atlantic 10 men's basketball tournament was played March 12–16 at the Barclays Center in Brooklyn, New York. This was a 13 team tournament with the addition of George Mason. The top 11 seeds got the first round bye and the top 4 seeds got a double bye. The 2014 tournament champion received an automatic bid to the 2014 NCAA tournament. The 2014 championship game was nationally televised on CBS for the fourth straight year. The Saint Joseph's Hawks defeated the VCU Rams 65-61 in the championship to earn an automatic bid to the 2014 NCAA tournament.

== Seeds ==
Teams are seeded by record within the conference, with a tiebreaker system to seed teams with identical conference records.

Seed	School	Conference	Overall	Tiebreaker
1	Saint Louis	13–3	26–5	
2	VCU	12–4	24–7	
3	George Washington	11–5	23–7	1–0 vs. Saint Joseph's
4	Saint Joseph's	11–5	21–9	0–1 vs. George Washington
5	Dayton	10–6	22–9	1–0 vs. Massachusetts
6	Massachusetts	10–6	23–7	0–1 vs. Dayton
7	Richmond	8–8	18–13	
8	La Salle	7–9	15–15	
9	St. Bonaventure	6–10	16–14	
10	Duquesne	5–11	13–16	1–0 vs. Rhode Island
11	Rhode Island	5–11	14–17	0–1 vs. Duquesne
12	George Mason	4–12	11–19	
13	Fordham	2–14	9–20	

== Schedule ==
Session	Game	Time*	Matchup^{#}	Television	Score
First round - Wednesday, March 12
1	1	7:00 pm	#12 George Mason vs. #13 Fordham		70–67
Second round - Thursday, March 13
2	2	12:00 pm	#8 La Salle vs. #9 St. Bonaventure	CSN	82–72
2	3	2:30 pm	#5 Dayton vs. #13 Fordham	NBCSN	87–74
3	4	6:30 pm	#7 Richmond vs. #10 Duquesne	NBCSN	76–64
3	5	9:00 pm	#6 Massachusetts vs. #11 Rhode Island	CSN	65–61
Quarterfinals - Friday, March 14
4	6	12:00 pm	#1 St. Louis vs. #9 St. Bonaventure	NBCSN	71–68
4	7	2:30 pm	#4 Saint Joseph's vs. #5 Dayton	NBCSN	70–67
5	8	6:30 pm	#2 VCU vs. #7 Richmond	NBCSN	71–53
5	9	9:00 pm	#3 George Washington vs. #6 Massachusetts	NBCSN	85–77
Semifinals - Saturday, March 15
6	10	1:30 pm	#9 St. Bonaventure vs. #4 Saint Joseph's	CBSSN	67–48
6	11	4:00 pm	#2 VCU vs. #3 George Washington	CBSSN	74–55
Championship Game - Sunday, March 16
7	12	1:00 pm	#2 VCU vs. #4 Saint Joseph's	CBS	65-61

*Game times in Eastern Time. #Rankings denote tournament seeding.

== Bracket ==
First round Wednesday, March 12, 2014
12	George Mason	67
13	Fordham	70

Second round Thursday, March 13, 2014; CSN (Regional)/NBCSN
1	#18 Saint Louis
(bye)
8	La Salle	72
9	St. Bonaventure	82
4	Saint Joseph's
(bye)
5	Dayton	87
13	Fordham	74
2	#23 VCU
(bye)
7	Richmond	76
10	Duquesne	64
3	George Washington
(bye)
6	Massachusetts	65
11	Rhode Island	61

Quarterfinals; Friday, March 14, 2014; NBCSN
1	#18 Saint Louis	68
9	St. Bonaventure	71
4	Saint Joseph's	70
5	Dayton	67
2	#23 VCU	71
7	Richmond	53
3	George Washington	85
6	Massachusetts	77

Semifinals; Saturday, March 15, 2014; CBSSN
9	St. Bonaventure	48
4	Saint Joseph's	67
2	#23 VCU	74
3	George Washington	55

Championship; Sunday, March 16, 2014; CBS
4	Saint Joseph's	65
2	#23 VCU	61

== See also ==
- 2014 Atlantic 10 women's basketball tournament
