= 2013–14 Duquesne Dukes men's basketball team =

American college basketball season

2013–14 Duquesne Dukes men's basketball
- Conference: Atlantic 10 Conference
- Record: 13–17 (5–11 A-10)
- Head coach: Jim Ferry (2nd season)
- Assistant coaches: Brian Nash; John Rhodes; Rich Glesmann
- Home arena: A. J. Palumbo Center (Capacity: 4,406)

2013–14 Atlantic 10 men's basketball standings
	Conf.				Overall
Team	W		L	PCT	W		L	PCT
No. 25 Saint Louis	13	–	3	.813	27	–	7	.794
No. 24 VCU	12	–	4	.750	26	–	9	.743
George Washington	11	–	5	.688	24	–	9	.727
Saint Joseph's †	11	–	5	.688	24	–	10	.706
UMass	10	–	6	.625	24	–	9	.727
Dayton	10	–	6	.625	26	–	11	.703
Richmond	8	–	8	.500	19	–	14	.576
La Salle	7	–	9	.438	15	–	16	.484
St. Bonaventure	6	–	10	.375	18	–	15	.545
Rhode Island	5	–	11	.313	14	–	18	.438
Duquesne	5	–	11	.313	13	–	17	.433
George Mason	4	–	12	.250	11	–	20	.355
Fordham	2	–	14	.125	10	–	21	.323
† 2014 A10 Tournament winner Rankings from AP poll

The 2013–14 Duquesne Dukes men's basketball team represented Duquesne University during the 2013–14 NCAA Division I men's basketball season. The Dukes, led by second year head coach Jim Ferry, played their home games at the A. J. Palumbo Center and were members of the Atlantic 10 Conference. They finished the season 13–17, 5–11 in A-10 play to finish in a tie for tenth place.

They lost in the second round of the A-10 tournament to Richmond.

== Roster ==
2013–14 Duquesne Dukes men's basketball team
Players
Coaches

Pos.	#	Name	Height	Weight	Year	Previous school	Hometown
F	0	Ovie Soko	6 ft 8 in (2.03 m)	225 lb (102 kg)	RS Sr	UAB; Bethel	London, ENG
G	1	Derrick Colter	5 ft 11 in (1.8 m)	180 lb (82 kg)	So	Largo	Forestville, MD
G	2	Tra'Vaughn White	5 ft 10 in (1.78 m)	190 lb (86 kg)	Jr	Independence CC; Washington	Kansas City, KS
F	3	Dominique McKoy	6 ft 8 in (2.03 m)	215 lb (98 kg)	Jr	Cowley County CC; South Atlanta	Atlanta, GA
G	4	Christian Johnston	5 ft 10 in (1.78 m)	150 lb (68 kg)	So	Shaler	Pittsburgh, PA
G/F	5	Jerry Jones	6 ft 4 in (1.93 m)	195 lb (88 kg)	Sr	Inkster	Detroit, MI
F	13	Isaiah Watkins	6 ft 7 in (2.01 m)	220 lb (100 kg)	Fr	St. Benedict's Prep	Toronto, ON
G	21	Brandon Cartmill	5 ft 10 in (1.78 m)	170 lb (77 kg)	So	Cumberland Valley	Carlise, PA
G	22	Micah Mason	6 ft 2 in (1.88 m)	180 lb (82 kg)	So	Drake; Highlands	Natrona Heights, PA
G	23	Jeremiah Jones	6 ft 3 in (1.91 m)	190 lb (86 kg)	So	Merrillville	Gary, IN
G	32	Desmond Ridenour	6 ft 2 in (1.88 m)	185 lb (84 kg)	Fr	Benedictine	Cleveland Heights, OH
F	33	L.G. Gill	6 ft 7 in (2.01 m)	210 lb (95 kg)	Fr	Benedictine College Prep	Chesterfield, VA
F	44	Nick Foschia	6 ft 4 in (1.93 m)	215 lb (98 kg)	So	Walsh Jesuit	Northfield Center, OH
C	54	Darius Lewis	6 ft 11 in (2.11 m)	255 lb (116 kg)	Fr	IMG Academy	Lexington, KY
F	55	Jordan Robinson	6 ft 8 in (2.03 m)	255 lb (116 kg)	Fr	Quality Education Academy	Toronto, ON

Head coach

- Jim Ferry (Keene State)

Assistant coach(es)

- Brian Nash (Keene State)
- John Rhodes (Ohio)
- Rich Glesmann (Emerson)

Legend

- (C) Team captain
- (S) Suspended
- (I) Ineligible
- (W) Walk-on
- Injured
- Current redshirt

Roster
Last update: 2013-09-27

== Schedule ==
Date time, TV	Opponent	Result	Record	Site (attendance) city, state
Exhibition
11/02/2013*; 1:00 pm	Clarion	W 103–88		A.J. Palumbo Center (1,373); Pittsburgh, PA
Regular season
11/09/2013*; 4:00 pm	Abilene Christian	W 94–75	1–0	A.J. Palumbo Center (2,482); Pittsburgh, PA
11/13/2013*; 7:00 pm	New Hampshire	L 81–84	1–1	A.J. Palumbo Center (2,092); Pittsburgh, PA
11/17/2013*; 4:00 pm, RTPT	at West Virginia	L 83–96	1–2	WVU Coliseum (6,038); Morgantown, WV
11/20/2013*; 7:00 pm	Albany	W 70–59	2–2	A.J. Palumbo Center (1,991); Pittsburgh, PA
11/30/2013*; 1:00 pm, CBSSN	vs. Pittsburgh; City Game	L 67–84	2–3	Consol Energy Center (11,146); Pittsburgh, PA
12/04/2013*; 7:00 pm	UMBC	W 94–88	3–3	A.J. Palumbo Center (1,861); Pittsburgh, PA
12/11/2013*; 7:00 pm	Penn State	L 59–68	3–4	Consol Energy Center (5,246); Pittsburgh, PA
12/14/2013*; 2:00 pm	Robert Morris	L 63–67	3–5	A.J. Palumbo Center (2,515); Pittsburgh, PA
12/17/2013*; 7:00 pm	at Saint Francis (PA)	W 78–71	4–5	DeGol Arena (725); Loretto, PA
12/21/2013*; 2:00 pm	at UMass Lowell	W 95–77	5–5	Tsongas Center (1,758); Lowell, MA
12/29/2013*; 3:00 pm	at Texas–Pan American	W 88–69	6–5	UTPA Fieldhouse (702); Edinburg, TX
01/02/2014*; 7:00 pm	Appalachian State	W 79–55	7–5	A.J. Palumbo Center (1,892); Pittsburgh, PA
01/08/2014; 7:00 pm	Fordham	W 87–81	8–5 (1–0)	A.J. Palumbo Center (2,328); Pittsburgh, PA
01/12/2014; 2:30 pm, NBCSN	La Salle	L 56–75	8–6 (1–1)	A.J. Palumbo Center (3,740); Pittsburgh, PA
01/15/2014; 7:00 pm	at Saint Joseph's	L 75–84	8–7 (1–2)	Hagan Arena (3,927); Philadelphia, PA
01/18/2014; 4:00 pm, CBSSN	at VCU	L 65–80	8–8 (1–3)	Stuart C. Siegel Center (7,741); Richmond, VA
01/22/2014; 4:00 pm	No. 19 Saint Louis	L 72–76	8–9 (1–4)	A.J. Palumbo Center (2,274); Pittsburgh, PA
01/25/2014; 2:00 pm, RTPT	St. Bonaventure	W 83–81	9–9 (2–4)	A.J. Palumbo Center (2,947); Pittsburgh, PA
01/29/2014*; 7:00 pm	at NJIT	W 71–64	10–9	Fleisher Center (864); Newark, NJ
02/01/2014; 4:00 pm, RTPT	at La Salle	L 63–71	10–10 (2–5)	Tom Gola Arena (2,515); Philadelphia, PA
02/05/2014; 12:30 pm	at George Washington	L 57–71	10–11 (2–6)	Smith Center (3,047); Washington, D.C.
02/08/2014; 2:00 pm	George Mason	L 68–74	10–12 (2–7)	A.J. Palumbo Center (2,923); Pittsburgh, PA
02/12/2014; 7:00 pm	Richmond	L 58–75	10–13 (2–8)	A.J. Palumbo Center (2,644); Pittsburgh, PA
02/15/2014; 12:00 pm, OSN	at Rhode Island	W 83–71	11–13 (3–8)	Ryan Center (4,112); Kingston, RI
02/19/2014; 2:00 pm, RTPT	at St. Bonaventure	L 67–71	11–14 (3–9)	Reilly Center (3,722); Olean, NY
02/22/2014; 2:00 pm	Dayton	L 54–57	11–15 (3–10)	Consol Energy Center (6,271); Pittsburgh, PA
02/27/2014; 8:00 pm, NBCSN	at No. 10 Saint Louis	W 71–64	12–15 (4–10)	Chaifetz Arena (10,245); St. Louis, MO
03/05/2014; 7:00 pm	Massachusetts	L 74–78	12–16 (4–11)	A.J. Palumbo Center (2,297); Pittsburgh, PA
03/08/2014; 7:00 pm, MASN	at George Mason	W 81–69	13–16 (5–11)	Patriot Center (5,724); Fairfax, VA
Atlantic 10 tournament
03/13/2014; 6:30 pm, NBCSN	vs. Richmond; Second round	L 64–76	13–17	Barclays Center (6,107); Brooklyn, NY
*Non-conference game. ^{#}Rankings from AP Poll. (#) Tournament seedings in parentheses. All times are in Eastern Time.
