= 2013–14 Fordham Rams men's basketball team =

American college basketball season

2013–14 Fordham Rams men's basketball
- Conference: Atlantic 10
- Record: 10–21 (2–14 A-10)
- Head coach: Tom Pecora
- Assistant coaches: David Duke; John Morton; Tom Parrotta
- Home arena: Rose Hill Gymnasium

2013–14 Atlantic 10 men's basketball standings
	Conf.				Overall
Team	W		L	PCT	W		L	PCT
No. 25 Saint Louis	13	–	3	.813	27	–	7	.794
No. 24 VCU	12	–	4	.750	26	–	9	.743
George Washington	11	–	5	.688	24	–	9	.727
Saint Joseph's †	11	–	5	.688	24	–	10	.706
UMass	10	–	6	.625	24	–	9	.727
Dayton	10	–	6	.625	26	–	11	.703
Richmond	8	–	8	.500	19	–	14	.576
La Salle	7	–	9	.438	15	–	16	.484
St. Bonaventure	6	–	10	.375	18	–	15	.545
Rhode Island	5	–	11	.313	14	–	18	.438
Duquesne	5	–	11	.313	13	–	17	.433
George Mason	4	–	12	.250	11	–	20	.355
Fordham	2	–	14	.125	10	–	21	.323
† 2014 A10 Tournament winner Rankings from AP poll

The 2013–14 Fordham Rams men's basketball team represented Fordham University during the 2013–14 NCAA Division I men's basketball season. The team was coached by Tom Pecora in his fourth year at the school. Fordham Rams home games were played at Rose Hill Gymnasium and the team are a member of the Atlantic 10 Conference. They finished the season 10–21, 2–14 in A-10 play to finish in last place. They advanced to the second round of the A-10 tournament where they lost to Dayton.

== Roster ==
2013–14 Fordham Rams men's basketball team
Players
Coaches

Pos.	#	Name	Height	Weight	Year	Hometown
G	0	Branden Frazier (C)	6 ft 3 in (1.91 m)	170 lb (77 kg)	Sr	Brooklyn, NY
G	1	Mandell Thomas	6 ft 2 in (1.88 m)	185 lb (84 kg)	So	Rochester, NY
F	2	Travion Leonard	6 ft 8 in (2.03 m)	275 lb (125 kg)	So	Raleigh, NC
G	3	Matt Massimino (W)	5 ft 11 in (1.8 m)	155 lb (70 kg)	Fr	New Hope, PA
G	5	Antwoine Anderson (I)	6 ft 1 in (1.85 m)	170 lb (77 kg)	Fr	Rochester, NY
G	10	Jon Severe	6 ft 3 in (1.91 m)	186 lb (84 kg)	Fr	Brooklyn, NY
G	12	Jake Fay	6 ft 6 in (1.98 m)	195 lb (88 kg)	Fr	Lynn, MA
G	13	Chris Whitehead	5 ft 9 in (1.75 m)	190 lb (86 kg)	Jr	New Albany, IN
G	15	Nihad Musovic (W)	6 ft 0 in (1.83 m)	185 lb (84 kg)	So	Yonkers, NY
G	20	Jared Fay	6 ft 3 in (1.91 m)	170 lb (77 kg)	So	Lynn, MA
G	22	Jermaine Myers	6 ft 0 in (1.83 m)	180 lb (82 kg)	So	Ajax, ONT
G	24	Bryan Smith	6 ft 2 in (1.88 m)	195 lb (88 kg)	Jr	Brooklyn, NY
F	25	Leo Walsh (W)	6 ft 4 in (1.93 m)	198 lb (90 kg)	Sr	Clarks Green, PA
F	30	Ryan Rhoomes	6 ft 8 in (2.03 m)	235 lb (107 kg)	So	Middletown, NY
G	32	DC Gaitley (W)	6 ft 2 in (1.88 m)	190 lb (86 kg)	Jr	Haverford, PA
G/F	33	Victor Ieronymides (W)	6 ft 6 in (1.98 m)	208 lb (94 kg)	Fr	Nicosia, Cyprus
G	35	Khalid Robinson (W)	6 ft 3 in (1.91 m)	200 lb (91 kg)	Sr	Harlem, NY
C	42	Ryan Canty	6 ft 9 in (2.06 m)	230 lb (104 kg)	Jr	Danvers, MA
F	44	Manny Suarez (I)	6 ft 10 in (2.08 m)	225 lb (102 kg)	Fr	Cliffside Park, NJ

Head coach

- Tom Pecora (Adelphi)

Assistant coach(es)

- David Duke (Albany)
- John Morton (Seton Hall)
- Tom Parrotta (Fordham)

Legend

- (C) Team captain
- (S) Suspended
- (I) Ineligible
- (W) Walk-on
- Injured
- Current redshirt

== Schedule and results ==
Date time, TV	Rank^{#}	Opponent^{#}	Result	Record	Site (attendance) city, state
Exhibition
11/01/2013*; 7:00 pm		Northwood	W 98–80	–	Rose Hill Gymnasium (N/A); Bronx, NY
Regular season
11/08/2013*; 8:30 pm, SNY		Saint Francis (PA)	W 87–67	1–0	Rose Hill Gymnasium (2,036); Bronx, NY
11/12/2013*; 7:30 pm, ESPN3		at No. 9 Syracuse	L 74–89	1–1	Carrier Dome (22,267); Syracuse, NY
11/15/2013*; 7:00 pm, SNY		Lehigh	W 80–72	2–1	Rose Hill Gymnasium (2,128); Bronx, NY
11/23/2013*; 4:00 pm		Sacred Heart	L 73–85	2–2	Rose Hill Gymnasium (2,281); Bronx, NY
11/26/2013*; 7:00 pm		at Manhattan; Battle of the Bronx	W 79–75	3–2	Draddy Gymnasium (2,520); Riverdale, NY
12/04/2013*; 7:00 pm		Furman	W 79–48	4–2	Rose Hill Gymnasium (1,462); Bronx, NY
12/07/2013*; 1:30 pm, MSG		at St. John's; Rivalry/Madison Square Garden Holiday Festival	L 58–104	4–3	Madison Square Garden (10,803); New York City, NY
12/10/2013*; 7:00 pm		at Colgate	W 77–73	5–3	Cotterell Court (630); Hamilton, NY
12/14/2013*; 2:00 pm, SNY		Howard	W 79–60	6–3	Rose Hill Gymnasium (1,432); Bronx, NY
12/21/2013*; 2:00 pm		at Monmouth	L 78–87	6–4	Multipurpose Activity Center (1,815); West Long Branch, NJ
12/23/2013*; 4:00 pm		Loyola	W 83–69	7–4	Rose Hill Gymnasium (2,959); Bronx, NY
12/28/2013*; 4:00 pm, SNY		Harvard	L 86–94	7–5	Rose Hill Gymnasium (3,200); Bronx, NY
12/30/2013*; 7:00 pm		at Siena	L 69–79	7–6	Times Union Center (6,131); Albany, NY
01/08/2014; 7:00 pm		at Duquesne	L 81–87	7–7 (0–1)	A.J. Palumbo Center (2,328); Pittsburgh, PA
01/11/2014; 7:00 pm, SNY		Richmond	L 74–77 ^{OT}	7–8 (0–2)	Rose Hill Gymnasium (2,911); Bronx, NY
01/15/2014; 9:00 pm, SNY		Dayton	L 68–80	7–9 (0–3)	Rose Hill Gymnasium (2,249); Bronx, NY
01/18/2014; 2:30 pm, NBCSN		at No. 24 Saint Louis	L 48–70	7–10 (0–4)	Chaifetz Arena (9,265); St. Louis, MO
01/22/2014; 7:00 pm		George Mason	W 76–70	8–10 (1–4)	Rose Hill Gymnasium (1,352); Bronx, NY
01/26/2014; 12:00 pm, NBCSN		at No. 13 Massachusetts	L 52–90	8–11 (1–5)	Mullins Center (9,493); Amherst, MA
01/29/2014; 7:00 pm		at VCU	L 60–76	8–12 (1–6)	Stuart C. Siegel Center (7,741); Richmond, VA
02/01/2014; 7:00 pm, SNY		Rhode Island	W 85–79	9–12 (2–6)	Rose Hill Gymnasium (2,851); Bronx, NY
02/08/2014; 4:00 pm, SNY		at George Washington	L 67–93	9–13 (2–7)	Smith Center (4,617); Washington, D.C.
02/12/2014; 9:00 pm, SNY		St. Bonaventure	L 65–76	9–14 (2–8)	Rose Hill Gymnasium (1,623); Bronx, NY
02/15/2014; 6:00 pm, SNY		at Richmond	L 70–82	9–15 (2–9)	Robins Center (7,201); Richmond, VA
02/22/2014; 2:00 pm		at Saint Joseph's	L 72–87	9–16 (2–10)	Hagan Arena (4,200); Philadelphia, PA
02/27/2014; 7:00 pm, CBSSN		VCU	L 66–85	9–17 (2–11)	Rose Hill Gymnasium (2,253); Bronx, NY
03/01/2014; 5:00 pm, NBCSN		La Salle	L 62–64	9–18 (2–12)	Rose Hill Gymnasium (3,017); Bronx, NY
03/05/2014; 7:00 pm		at Rhode Island	L 65–77	9–19 (2–13)	Ryan Center (4,414); Kingston, RI
03/08/2014; 2:00 pm, SNY		George Washington	L 67–70	9–20 (2–14)	Rose Hill Gymnasium (3,200); Bronx, NY
Atlantic 10 tournament
03/12/2014; 7:00 pm		vs. George Mason; First round	W 70–67	10–20	Barclays Center (3,842); Brooklyn, NY
03/13/2014; 2:30 pm, NBCSN		vs. Dayton; Second round	L 74–87	10–21	Barclays Center (7,308); Brooklyn, NY
*Non-conference game. ^{#}Rankings from AP Poll. (#) Tournament seedings in parentheses. All times are in Eastern Time.
