= 2013–14 Jacksonville State Gamecocks men's basketball team =

American college basketball season

2013–14 Jacksonville State Gamecocks men's basketball
- Conference: Ohio Valley Conference
- East Division
- Record: 10–21 (4–12 OVC)
- Head coach: James Green (6th season)
- Assistant coaches: Tom Schuberth; Reggie Sharp; Eugene Harris
- Home arena: Pete Mathews Coliseum

2013–14 Ohio Valley Conference men's basketball standings
	Conf.				Overall
Team	W		L	PCT	W		L	PCT
East
Belmont	14	–	2	.875	26	–	10	.722
Eastern Kentucky †	11	–	5	.688	24	–	10	.706
Morehead State	10	–	6	.625	20	–	14	.588
Tennessee Tech	9	–	7	.563	17	–	16	.515
Jacksonville State	4	–	12	.250	10	–	21	.323
Tennessee State	4	–	12	.250	5	–	25	.167
West
Murray State	13	–	3	.813	23	–	11	.676
Southeast Missouri State	8	–	8	.500	18	–	14	.563
Eastern Illinois	7	–	9	.438	11	–	19	.367
SIU Edwardsville	7	–	9	.438	11	–	20	.355
Austin Peay	6	–	10	.375	12	–	18	.400
UT Martin	3	–	13	.188	8	–	23	.258
† 2014 OVC tournament winner Rankings from AP poll

The 2013–14 Jacksonville State Gamecocks men's basketball team represented Jacksonville State University during the 2013–14 NCAA Division I men's basketball season. The Gamecocks, led by sixth year head coach James Green, played their home games at the Pete Mathews Coliseum and were members of the East Division of the Ohio Valley Conference. They finished the season 10–21, 4–12 in OVC play to finish in a tie for fifth place in the East Division. They failed to qualify for the Ohio Valley Tournament. in 2017 the Jacksonville Gamecocks also made their first ever NCAA Tournament

== Roster ==
Number	Name	Position	Height	Weight	Year	Hometown
1	Avery Moore	Guard	5–10	155	Junior	Tallahassee, Florida
2	Undra Mitchem	Guard	6–2	200	Freshman	Leesburg, Florida
3	Randall Smith	Guard	6–0	170	Freshman	Lawrenceville, Georgia
4	Joe Kuligoski	Guard/Forward	6–5	210	Freshman	Orland Park, Illinois
5	Rico Sanders	Guard	6–3	190	Senior	College Park, Georgia
10	Nathan Laing	Guard	6–0	165	Freshman	Lillington, North Carolina
11	Darion Rackley	Guard	6–3	170	Junior	St. Louis, Missouri
14	Jeremy Watson	Forward	6–7	200	Junior	Birmingham, Alabama
15	Grant White	Forward	6–2	175	Junior	Monroeville, Alabama
20	Joshua Nicholson	Guard	6–1	195	Senior	Bethlehem, Pennsylvania
21	Brian Williams	Guard	6–1	175	Senior	Lawrenceville, Georgia
22	Mike Louder	Forward	6–9	185	Sophomore	Henderson, Nevada
23	D.J. Felder	Forward	6–7	232	Junior	Topeka, Kansas
24	Darrius Moore	Forward	6–8	252	Sophomore	Memphis, Tennessee
25	Rod McReynolds	Guard	5–8	155	Senior	Douglasville, Georgia
31	Teraes Clemmons	Guard/Forward	6–6	200	Junior	Mt. Juliet, Tennessee
32	Jamal Hunter	Center/Forward	6–8	200	Junior	Macon, Mississippi
33	Nick Cook	Forward	6–6	220	Senior	Hattiesburg, Mississippi

== Schedule ==
Date time, TV	Opponent	Result	Record	Site (attendance) city, state
Exhibition
10/31/2013*; 6:45 pm	West Georgia	W 65–52		Pete Mathews Coliseum (1,208); Jacksonville, Alabama
11/04/2013*; 7:00 pm	Martin Methodist	W 80–78		Pete Mathews Coliseum (1,002); Jacksonville, Alabama
Regular Season
11/08/2013*; 7:00 pm	at Bradley	L 65–72	0–1	Carver Arena (7,209); Peoria, Illinois
11/10/2013*; 5:00 pm, ESPN3	at Illinois	L 62–86	0–2	State Farm Center (13,506); Champaign, Illinois
11/12/2013*; 7:00 pm	at Chicago State	L 75–79	0–3	Jones Convocation Center (897); Chicago
11/16/2013*; 7:00 pm	Alabama State	L 73–84	0–4	Pete Mathews Coliseum (986); Jacksonville, Alabama
11/19/2013*; 7:00 pm	at Auburn	L 54–78	0–5	Auburn Arena (4,016); Auburn, Alabama
11/22/2013*; 1:00 pm	Dalton State	W 85–61	1–5	Pete Mathews Coliseum (982); Jacksonville, Alabama
11/25/2013*; 7:00 pm	at Alabama A&M	W 76–69	2–5	Elmore Gymnasium (1,127); Huntsville, Alabama
11/27/2013*; 2:00 pm	Fort Valley State	W 78–66	3–5	Pete Mathews Coliseum (583); Jacksonville, Alabama
11/30/2013*; 6:00 pm	at Central Michigan	L 61–66	3–6	McGuirk Arena (769); Mount Pleasant, Michigan
12/08/2013*; 5:00 pm	at Florida State	L 53–77	3–7	Donald L. Tucker Center (5,104); Tallahassee, Florida
12/11/2013*; 7:00 pm	Alcorn State	W 63–52	4–7	Pete Mathews Coliseum (N/A); Jacksonville, Alabama
12/14/2013*; 3:00 pm	at Dartmouth	L 46–76	4–8	Leede Arena (503); Hanover, New Hampshire
12/17/2013*; 7:45 pm	Central Michigan	W 82–73	5–8	Pete Mathews Coliseum (2,143); Jacksonville, Alabama
12/20/2013*; 6:00 pm	vs. Arkansas–Little Rock; BVI Tropical Shootout	L 70–75	5–9	Multipurpose Sports Complex (N/A); Tortola, BVI
12/21/2013*; 5:00 pm	vs. Coppin State; BVI Tropical Shootout	W 72–61	6–9	Multipurpose Sports Complex (N/A); Tortola, BVI
12/30/2013; 7:45 pm	UT Martin	W 70–65	7–9 (1–0)	Pete Mathews Coliseum (987); Jacksonville, Alabama
01/02/2014; 7:00 pm	at Belmont	L 67–78	7–10 (1–1)	Curb Event Center (1,790); Nashville, Tennessee
01/04/2014; 7:00 pm	at Tennessee State	L 65–70	7–11 (1–2)	Gentry Complex (625); Nashville, Tennessee
01/09/2014; 7:00 pm	SIU Edwardsville	W 61–52	8–11 (2–2)	Pete Mathews Coliseum (1,282); Jacksonville, Alabama
01/11/2014; 4:30 pm	Eastern Illinois	L 48–56	8–12 (2–3)	Pete Mathews Coliseum (2,112); Jacksonville, Alabama
01/16/2014; 7:00 pm	Tennessee State	W 70–64	9–12 (3–3)	Pete Mathews Coliseum (2,491); Jacksonville, Alabama
01/18/2014; 6:00 pm	at Eastern Kentucky	L 56–60	9–13 (3–4)	McBrayer Arena (2,300); Richmond, Kentucky
01/23/2014; 7:00 pm	at Austin Peay	W 71–59	10–13 (4–4)	Dunn Center (2,208); Clarksville, Tennessee
01/25/2014; 7:30 pm	at Murray State	L 65–73	10–14 (4–5)	CFSB Center (5,028); Murray, Kentucky
02/01/2014; 1:00 pm	at Morehead State	L 54–65	10–15 (4–6)	Ellis Johnson Arena (1,909); Morehead, Kentucky
02/08/2014; 11:00 am	Tennessee Tech	L 60–72	10–16 (4–7)	Pete Mathews Coliseum (1,423); Jacksonville, Alabama
02/13/2014; 7:00 pm	Morehead State	L 67–69	10–17 (4–8)	Pete Mathews Coliseum (1,817); Jacksonville, Alabama
02/15/2014; 4:30 pm	Eastern Kentucky	L 65–86	10–18 (4–9)	Pete Mathews Coliseum (1,608); Jacksonville, Alabama
02/20/2014; 7:00 pm	at Southeast Missouri State	L 70–87	10–19 (4–10)	Show Me Center (1,568); Cape Girardeau, Missouri
02/22/2014; 7:00 pm	at Tennessee Tech	L 57–69	10–20 (4–11)	Eblen Center (1,522); Cookeville, Tennessee
03/01/2014; 4:30 pm	Belmont	L 53–76	10–21 (4–12)	Pete Mathews Coliseum (1,806); Jacksonville, Alabama
*Non-conference game. ^{#}Rankings from AP Poll. (#) Tournament seedings in parentheses. All times are in Central Time.
