= 2013–14 Morehead State Eagles men's basketball team =

American college basketball season

2013–14 Morehead State Eagles men's basketball

CBI first round vs. Illinois State, L 67–77
- Conference: Ohio Valley Conference
- East Division
- Record: 20–14 (10–6 OVC)
- Head coach: Sean Woods (2nd season)
- Assistant coaches: Dylan Howard; Brian "B.J." Ellis; Beau Braden
- Home arena: Ellis Johnson Arena

2013–14 Ohio Valley Conference men's basketball standings
	Conf.				Overall
Team	W		L	PCT	W		L	PCT
East
Belmont	14	–	2	.875	26	–	10	.722
Eastern Kentucky †	11	–	5	.688	24	–	10	.706
Morehead State	10	–	6	.625	20	–	14	.588
Tennessee Tech	9	–	7	.563	17	–	16	.515
Jacksonville State	4	–	12	.250	10	–	21	.323
Tennessee State	4	–	12	.250	5	–	25	.167
West
Murray State	13	–	3	.813	23	–	11	.676
Southeast Missouri State	8	–	8	.500	18	–	14	.563
Eastern Illinois	7	–	9	.438	11	–	19	.367
SIU Edwardsville	7	–	9	.438	11	–	20	.355
Austin Peay	6	–	10	.375	12	–	18	.400
UT Martin	3	–	13	.188	8	–	23	.258
† 2014 OVC tournament winner Rankings from AP poll

The 2013–14 Morehead State Eagles men's basketball team represented Morehead State University during the 2013–14 NCAA Division I men's basketball season. The Eagles, led by second year head coach Sean Woods, played their home games at Ellis Johnson Arena and were members of the East Division of the Ohio Valley Conference. They finished the season 20–14, 10–6 in OVC play to finish in third place in the East Division. They advanced to the semifinals of the OVC tournament where they lost to Belmont. They were invited to the College Basketball Invitational where they lost in the first round to Illinois State.

== Roster ==
Number	Name	Position	Height	Weight	Year	Hometown
00	Drew Kelly	Forward	6–6	245	Senior	Franklin, Tennessee
1	Luka Pajkovic	Guard	6–3	200	Junior	Belgrade, Serbia
2	Jordan Percell	Forward	6–7	220	Junior	Campbellsville, Kentucky
3	Corban Collins	Guard	6–3	185	Freshman	High Point, North Carolina
4	DeAndre Leatherwood	Center	6–10	185	Junior	Germantown, Maryland
12	Bakari Turner	Guard	6–4	185	Senior	Plano, Texas
14	Jared Ravenscraft	Guard	6–2	205	Sophomore	Morehead, Kentucky
15	Kareem Storey	Forward	5–10	190	Junior	Baltimore, Maryland
20	Chad Posthumus	Center	6–11	265	Senior	Winnipeg, Manitoba
21	Jalen Courtney	Forward	6–7	220	Junior	Jackson, Mississippi
22	Angelo Warner	Guard	6–2	195	Junior	Orlando, Florida
24	Aary Bibens	Guard	6–4	200	Freshman	Bennington, Vermont
25	Karam Mashour	Forward	6–6	210	Junior	Nazareth, Israel
30	Greg Dotson	Forward	6–5	190	Freshman	Abington, Pennsylvania
31	Lyonell Gaines	Forward	6–6	220	Sophomore	Louisville, Kentucky
32	Brent Arrington	Guard	6–3	180	Sophomore	Halethorpe, Maryland
50	Billy Reader	Center	6–10	260	Junior	Lake Oswego, Oregon

== Schedule ==
Date time, TV	Opponent	Result	Record	Site (attendance) city, state
Regular season
11/09/2013*; 7:00 pm	Mid-Continent	W 107–60	1–0	Ellis Johnson Arena (2,031); Morehead, Kentucky
11/12/2013*; 7:00 pm	at East Tennessee State	W 71–63	2–0	ETSU/MSHA Athletic Center (2,402); Johnson City, Tennessee
11/15/2013*; 8:00 pm, FS2	at Xavier	L 56–79	2–1	Cintas Center (9,528); Cincinnati
11/17/2013*; 2:00 pm	Marshall	W 102–94 ^{OT}	3–1	Ellis Johnson Arena (3,506); Morehead, Kentucky
11/19/2013*; 7:00 pm	at Northern Kentucky	W 74–61	4–1	The Bank of Kentucky Center (2,144); Highland Heights, Kentucky
11/22/2013*; 11:00 pm, Pac-12 Network	at No. 22 UCLA; Las Vegas Invitational	L 70–81	4–2	Pauley Pavilion (5,508); Los Angeles
11/24/2013*; 6:00 pm	at Nevada; Las Vegas Invitational	W 63–58	5–2	Lawlor Events Center (5,133); Reno, Nevada
11/28/2013*; 5:00 pm	vs. Chattanooga; Las Vegas Invitational	W 88–75	6–2	Orleans Arena (N/A); Paradise, Nevada
11/29/2013*; 6:00 pm	vs. Gardner–Webb; Las Vegas Invitational	L 82–86 ^{OT}	6–3	Orleans Arena (N/A); Paradise, Nevada
12/02/2013*; 7:00 pm	Wright State	W 74–69	7–3	Ellis Johnson Arena (2,052); Morehead, Kentucky
12/04/2013*; 8:00 pm	at Southern Miss	L 60–74	7–4	Reed Green Coliseum (3,563); Hattiesburg, Mississippi
12/15/2013*; 2:00 pm	Bowling Green	L 61–67	7–5	Ellis Johnson Arena (1,507); Morehead, Kentucky
12/19/2013*; 7:00 pm	South Dakota	W 120–83	8–5	Ellis Johnson Arena (1,392); Morehead, Kentucky
12/23/2013*; 7:00 pm, ESPNU	at Tennessee	L 67–82	8–6	Thompson–Boling Arena (15,207); Knoxville, Tennessee
12/30/2013*; 7:00 pm	Asbury	W 102–68	9–6	Ellis Johnson Arena (1,488); Morehead, Kentucky
01/02/2014; 8:00 pm	at SIU Edwardsville	W 70–63	10–6 (1–0)	Vadalabene Center (1,111); Edwardsville, Illinois
01/04/2014; 3:00 pm	at Eastern Illinois	W 85–77	11–6 (2–0)	Lantz Arena (412); Charleston, Illinois
01/11/2014; 7:30 pm	Eastern Kentucky	L 65–76	11–7 (2–1)	Ellis Johnson Arena (5,011); Morehead, Kentucky
01/16/2014; 7:00 pm	Southeast Missouri State	W 80–67	12–7 (3–1)	Ellis Johnson Arena (2,210); Morehead, Kentucky
01/18/2014; 2:00 pm	UT Martin	W 82–75	13–7 (4–1)	Ellis Johnson Arena (1,727); Morehead, Kentucky
01/23/2014; 8:00 pm	at Belmont	L 66–80	13–8 (4–2)	Curb Event Center (2,468); Nashville, Tennessee
01/25/2014; 8:30 pm	at Tennessee State	W 80–74 ^{OT}	14–8 (5–2)	Gentry Complex (4,901); Nashville, Tennessee
01/29/2014; 9:00 pm	Belmont	L 73–76	14–9 (5–3)	Ellis Johnson Arena (3,823); Morehead, Kentucky
02/01/2014; 2:00 pm	Jacksonville State	W 65–54	15–9 (6–3)	Ellis Johnson Arena (1,909); Morehead, Kentucky
02/08/2014; 11:00 am	at Eastern Kentucky	W 86–79	16–9 (7–3)	McBrayer Arena (5,500); Richmond, Kentucky
02/13/2014; 8:00 pm	at Jacksonville State	W 69–67	17–9 (8–3)	Pete Mathews Coliseum (1,817); Jacksonville, Alabama
02/15/2014; 8:30 pm	at Tennessee Tech	W 79–53	18–9 (9–3)	Eblen Center (1,987); Cookeville, Tennessee
02/19/2014; 7:00 pm	Austin Peay	W 90–88 ^{2OT}	19–9 (10–3)	Ellis Johnson Arena (2,217); Morehead, Kentucky
02/22/2014; 8:00 pm	at Murray State	L 58–69	19–10 (10–4)	CFSB Center (5,856); Murray, Kentucky
02/27/2014; 7:30 pm	Tennessee State	L 68–70	19–11 (10–5)	Ellis Johnson Arena (1,479); Morehead, Kentucky
03/01/2014; 7:30 pm	Tennessee Tech	L 84–91	19–12 (10–6)	Ellis Johnson Arena (2,905); Morehead, Kentucky
Ohio Valley Conference tournament
03/06/2014; 7:00 pm, ESPN3	vs. Tennessee Tech; Quarterfinals	W 76–61	20–12	Nashville Municipal Auditorium (1,323); Nashville, Tennessee
03/07/2014; 7:30 pm, ESPNU	vs. Belmont; Semifinals	L 63–86	20–13	Nashville Municipal Auditorium (3,650); Nashville, Tennessee
CBI
03/19/2014*; 8:05 pm	at Illinois State; First round	L 67–77	20–14	Redbird Arena (2,080); Normal, Illinois
*Non-conference game. ^{#}Rankings from AP Poll. (#) Tournament seedings in parentheses. All times are in Eastern Time.
