= 2013–14 Tennessee State Tigers basketball team =

American college basketball season

2013–14 Tennessee State Tigers basketball
- Conference: Ohio Valley Conference
- East Division
- Record: 5–25 (4–12 OVC)
- Head coach: Travis Williams (2nd season)
- Assistant coaches: Ben Betts; Rodney Hamilton; Jason Slay
- Home arena: Gentry Complex

2013–14 Ohio Valley Conference men's basketball standings
	Conf.				Overall
Team	W		L	PCT	W		L	PCT
East
Belmont	14	–	2	.875	26	–	10	.722
Eastern Kentucky †	11	–	5	.688	24	–	10	.706
Morehead State	10	–	6	.625	20	–	14	.588
Tennessee Tech	9	–	7	.563	17	–	16	.515
Jacksonville State	4	–	12	.250	10	–	21	.323
Tennessee State	4	–	12	.250	5	–	25	.167
West
Murray State	13	–	3	.813	23	–	11	.676
Southeast Missouri State	8	–	8	.500	18	–	14	.563
Eastern Illinois	7	–	9	.438	11	–	19	.367
SIU Edwardsville	7	–	9	.438	11	–	20	.355
Austin Peay	6	–	10	.375	12	–	18	.400
UT Martin	3	–	13	.188	8	–	23	.258
† 2014 OVC tournament winner Rankings from AP poll

The 2013–14 Tennessee State Tigers basketball team represented Tennessee State University during the 2013–14 NCAA Division I men's basketball season. The Tigers, led by second year head coach Travis Williams, played their home games at the Gentry Complex and were members of the East Division of the Ohio Valley Conference. They finished the season 5–25, 4–12 in OVC play to finish in a tie for fifth place in the East Division. They failed to qualify for the Ohio Valley Tournament.

At the end of the season, head coach Travis Williams was fired after only two seasons and a record of 23–40.

== Roster ==
Number	Name	Position	Height	Weight	Year	Hometown
0	Jacquan Nobles	Guard	6–3	180	RS–Senior	Farina, Illinois
1	Jamonte Graham	Guard	6–1	200	Freshman	Nashville, Tennessee
2	Patrick Miller	Guard	6–1	195	Senior	Chicago, Illinois
3	Jaleel Queary	Guard	6–2	200	Junior	Nashville, Tennessee
4	M. J. Rhett	Forward	6–9	235	RS–Junior	Columbia, South Carolina
5	Jay Harris	Guard	5–10	170	Junior	Philadelphia
11	Alex Bates	Forward	6–9	235	RS–Junior	Greenbelt, Maryland
12	Ugo Mmonu	Forward	6–7	205	Freshman	Osina, Nigeria
21	Rhyan Townes	Guard	6–5	192	Freshman	Memphis, Tennessee
23	Jordan Gaither	Guard	6–3	170	Sophomore	Atlanta
30	Gerald Williams	Guard	6–2	175	RS–Sophomore	Atlanta
32	Chaed Wellan	Forward	6–8	190	Senior	Amsterdam, Netherlands
40	Kennedy Eubanks	Guard/Forward	6–6	185	Junior	Pendleton, South Carolina
44	Michael Green	Forward	6–9	195	Senior	Columbia, South Carolina

== Schedule ==
Date time, TV	Opponent	Result	Record	Site (attendance) city, state
Exhibition
11/04/2013*; 7:00 pm	LeMoyne–Owen	W 69–68		Gentry Complex (1,132); Nashville, Tennessee
Regular Season
11/08/2013*; 10:30 pm	at Hawaiʻi; Rainbow Classic	W 85–55	0–1	Stan Sheriff Center (N/A); Honolulu, HI
11/09/2013*; 10:30 pm	vs. New Mexico State; Rainbow Classic	L 55–70	0–2	Stan Sheriff Center (N/A); Honolulu, HI
11/11/2013*; 6:00 pm	vs. Western Michigan; Rainbow Classic	L 52–63	0–3	Stan Sheriff Center (156); Honolulu, HI
11/16/2013*; 12:00 pm	at No. 16 Wichita State; CBE Hall of Fame Classic	L 71–85	0–4	Charles Koch Arena (10,506); Wichita, Kansas
11/18/2013*; 7:00 pm	Libscomb	L 70–75	0–5	Gentry Complex (2,057); Nashville, Tennessee
11/22/2013*; 6:00 pm	at Tennessee	L 67–88	0–6	Thompson–Boling Arena (15,134); Knoxville, Tennessee
11/26/2013*; 7:00 pm	at Auburn	L 73–78	0–7	Auburn Arena (4,370); Auburn, Alabama
11/30/2013*; 2:00 pm	at USC Upstate	L 64–73	0–8	G. B. Hodge Center (513); Spartanburg, South Carolina
12/03/2013*; 7:00 pm	Alabama A&M	L 65–66	0–9	Gentry Complex (1,296); Nashville, Tennessee
12/07/2013*; 7:00 pm	at Drexel	L 61–75	0–10	Daskalakis Athletic Center (1,997); Philadelphia
12/15/2013*; 4:30 pm	Fisk	W 108–85	1–10	Gentry Complex (949); Nashville, Tennessee
12/19/2013*; 7:00 pm	at Illinois State	L 58–64	1–11	Redbird Arena (4,061); Normal, Illinois
12/21/2013*; 7:00 pm	Miami (OH)	L 64–79	1–12	Gentry Complex (812); Nashville, Tennessee
12/28/2013; 2:00 pm	at Eastern Illinois	L 69–70	1–13 (0–1)	Lantz Arena (391); Charleston, Illinois
01/02/2014; 7:00 pm	Tennessee Tech	L 53–57	1–14 (0–2)	Gentry Complex (275); Nashville, Tennessee
01/04/2014; 7:30 pm	Jacksonville State	W 70–65	2–14 (1–2)	Gentry Complex (625); Nashville, Tennessee
01/07/2014*; 7:00 pm	Middle Tennessee	L 66–74	2–15	Gentry Complex (413); Nashville, Tennessee
01/11/2014; 5:30 pm	at Southeast Missouri State	L 94–102	2–16 (1–3)	Show Me Center (2,053); Cape Girardeau, Missouri
01/13/2014; 7:30 pm	at UT Martin	L 81–100	2–17 (1–4)	Skyhawk Arena (2,090); Martin, Tennessee
01/16/2014; 7:00 pm	at Jacksonville State	L 64–70	2–18 (1–5)	Pete Mathews Coliseum (2,491); Jacksonville, Alabama
01/18/2014; 7:30 pm	Belmont	L 65–79	2–19 (1–6)	Gentry Complex (2,132); Nashville, Tennessee
01/23/2014; 7:00 pm	Eastern Kentucky	L 72–94	2–20 (1–7)	Gentry Complex (478); Nashville, Tennessee
01/25/2014; 7:30 pm	Morehead State	L 74–80 ^{OT}	2–21 (1–8)	Gentry Complex (4,901); Nashville, Tennessee
01/30/2014; 7:00 pm	at Tennessee Tech	W 81–68	3–21 (2–8)	Eblen Center (2,366); Cookeville, Tennessee
02/06/2014; 7:00 pm	Austin Peay	L 65–75	3–22 (2–9)	Gentry Complex (1,528); Nashville, Tennessee
02/08/2014; 7:30 pm	Murray State	L 65–73	3–23 (2–10)	Gentry Complex (4,381); Nashville, Tennessee
02/13/2014; 8:00 pm	at Belmont	L 71–73	3–24 (2–11)	Curb Event Center (2,007); Nashville, Tennessee
02/20/2014; 7:00 pm	SIU Edwardsville	W 66–61	4–24 (3–11)	Gentry Complex (531); Nashville, Tennessee
02/27/2014; 6:30 pm	at Morehead State	W 70–68	5–24 (4–11)	Ellis Johnson Arena (1,479); Morehead, Kentucky
03/01/2014; 6:00 pm	at Eastern Kentucky	L 66–70	5–25 (4–12)	McBrayer Arena (3,100); Richmond, Kentucky
*Non-conference game. ^{#}Rankings from AP Poll. (#) Tournament seedings in parentheses. All times are in Central Time.
