= 2013–14 Tennessee Tech Golden Eagles men's basketball team =

American college basketball season

2013–14 Tennessee Tech Golden Eagles men's basketball
- Conference: Ohio Valley Conference
- East Division
- Record: 17–16 (9–7 OVC)
- Head coach: Steve Payne (3rd season)
- Assistant coaches: Rick Cabrera; Frank Davis; Brian Kloman
- Home arena: Eblen Center

2013–14 Ohio Valley Conference men's basketball standings
	Conf.				Overall
Team	W		L	PCT	W		L	PCT
East
Belmont	14	–	2	.875	26	–	10	.722
Eastern Kentucky †	11	–	5	.688	24	–	10	.706
Morehead State	10	–	6	.625	20	–	14	.588
Tennessee Tech	9	–	7	.563	17	–	16	.515
Jacksonville State	4	–	12	.250	10	–	21	.323
Tennessee State	4	–	12	.250	5	–	25	.167
West
Murray State	13	–	3	.813	23	–	11	.676
Southeast Missouri State	8	–	8	.500	18	–	14	.563
Eastern Illinois	7	–	9	.438	11	–	19	.367
SIU Edwardsville	7	–	9	.438	11	–	20	.355
Austin Peay	6	–	10	.375	12	–	18	.400
UT Martin	3	–	13	.188	8	–	23	.258
† 2014 OVC tournament winner Rankings from AP poll

The 2013–14 Tennessee Tech Golden Eagles men's basketball team represented Tennessee Technological University during the 2013–14 NCAA Division I men's basketball season. The Golden Eagles, led by third-year head coach Steve Payne, played their home games at the Eblen Center and were members of the East Division of the Ohio Valley Conference. They finished the season 17–16, 9–7 in OVC play to finish in fourth place in the East Division. They advanced to the quarterfinals of the OVC tournament, where they lost to Morehead State.

== Roster ==
Number	Name	Position	Height	Weight	Year	Hometown
0	Josiah Moore	Guard	6–5	215	RS sophomore	Oakville, Ontario
1	Jordan Johnson	Guard	6–1	180	Junior	Hinesville, Georgia
2	Jeremiah Samarrippas	Guard	5–10	170	Senior	Bartow, Florida
3	Matt Marseille	Guard/forward	6–6	205	Senior	Brooklyn, New York
4	DeOndre Haynes	Guard	6–3	180	RS freshman	Calera, Alabama
5	Javon McKay	Guard/forward	6–5	195	Junior	Roswell, Georgia
11	Shirmane Thomas	Guard	6–2	175	Freshman	Homer, Louisiana
12	Mitchell Hill	Guard	6–1	170	Junior	Cookeville, Tennessee
14	Kevin Eaglin	Guard	5–11	186	Junior	New Iberia, Louisiana
15	Ammanuel Diressa	Guard	6–4	190	Sophomore	Toronto, Ontario
23	Ty Allen	Guard	6–2	180	Junior	Chicago, Illinois
24	Ladon Carter	Forward	6–6	224	Junior	Monroe, Louisiana
25	Mason Ramsey	Forward	6–6	220	Freshman	Livingston, Tennessee
33	Dennis Ogbe	Forward	6–7	220	Senior	Munich, Germany
35	Anthony Morse	Forward	6–9	215	Sophomore	Lawrenceville, Georgia
42	Dwan Caldwell	Center	6–8	245	Junior	Lancaster, California

== Schedule ==
Date time, TV	Opponent	Result	Record	Site (attendance) city, state
Regular season
11/09/2013*; 6:00 pm	at South Florida	L 62–72	0–1	USF Sun Dome (4,103); Tampa, Florida
11/12/2013*; 7:30 pm	Loyola–Chicago	W 74–69	1–1	Eblen Center (1,185); Cookeville, Tennessee
11/15/2013*; 5:00 pm	vs. Texas–Pan America; Islanders Classic	L 78–81	1–2	American Bank Center (N/A); Corpus Christi, Texas
11/16/2013*; 5:30 pm	at Texas A&M–Corpus Christi; Islanders Classic	W 62–60	2–2	American Bank Center (N/A); Corpus Christi, Texas
11/17/2013*; 1:00 pm	vs. IPFW; Islanders Classic	L 66–69	2–3	American Bank Center (N/A); Corpus Christi, Texas
11/21/2013*; 7:00 pm	Indiana–Kokomo	W 92–39	3–3	Eblen Center (1,221); Cookeville, Tennessee
11/23/2013*; 7:00 pm	Milwaukee	L 63–70	3–4	Eblen Center (1,114); Cookeville, Tennessee
11/26/2013*; 7:00 pm	East Tennessee State	W 98–83	4–4	Eblen Center (702); Cookeville, Tennessee
11/30/2013*; 7:00 pm	Utah Valley	L 71–74	5–4	Eblen Center (847); Cookeville, Tennessee
12/05/2013*; 6:00 pm, ESPN3	at Lipscomb	L 79–87	5–5	Allen Arena (N/A); Nashville, Tennessee
12/07/2013*; 11:00 am	at Tennessee	L 63–84	5–6	Thompson–Boling Arena (13,606); Knoxville, Tennessee
12/15/2013*; 2:00 pm	at Lamar	W 79–74	6–6	Montagne Center (1,696); Beaumont, Texas
12/17/2013*; 7:00 pm	at Green Bay	L 49–76	6–7	Resch Center (2,013); Green Bay, Wisconsin
12/19/2013*; 7:00 pm	Hillsdale	W 112–56	7–7	Eblen Center (930); Cookeville, Tennessee
12/28/2013*; 8:00 pm	at Utah Valley	L 66–75	7–8	UCCU Center (1,428); Orem, Utah
01/02/2014; 7:00 pm	at Tennessee State	W 57–53	8–8 (1–0)	Gentry Complex (275); Nashville, Tennessee
01/04/2014; 4:00 pm	at Belmont	L 62–64	8–9 (1–1)	Curb Event Center (2,520); Nashville, Tennessee
01/09/2013; 7:00 pm	Eastern Illinois	W 81–69	9–9 (2–1)	Eblen Center (1,418); Cookeville, Tennessee
01/11/2013; 7:30 pm	SIU Edwardsville	W 64–63	10–9 (3–1)	Eblen Center (2,632); Cookeville, Tennessee
01/18/2013; 7:00 pm	Southeast Missouri State	L 74–83	10–10 (3–2)	Eblen Center (2,035); Cookeville, Tennessee
01/23/2014; 7:00 pm	at Murray State	L 53–92	10–11 (3–3)	CFSB Center (2,285); Murray, Kentucky
01/25/2014; 7:30 pm	at Austin Peay	L 69–83	10–12 (3–4)	Dunn Center (3,133); Clarksville, Tennessee
01/30/2013; 7:00 pm	Tennessee State	L 68–81	10–13 (3–5)	Eblen Center (2,366); Cookeville, Tennessee
02/01/2013; 7:30 pm	Belmont	W 81–76	11–13 (4–5)	Eblen Center (3,277); Cookeville, Tennessee
02/08/2014; 4:30 pm	at Jacksonville State	W 72–60	12–13 (5–5)	Pete Mathews Coliseum (1,423); Jacksonville, Alabama
02/13/2013; 7:00 pm	Eastern Kentucky	W 72–66	13–13 (6–5)	Eblen Center (1,235); Cookeville, Tennessee
02/15/2013; 7:30 pm	Morehead State	L 53–79	13–14 (6–6)	Eblen Center (1,987); Cookeville, Tennessee
02/20/2014; 7:00 pm	at UT Martin	W 91–83	14–14 (7–6)	Skyhawk Arena (1,044); Martin, Tennessee
02/22/2013; 7:00 pm	Jacksonville State	W 69–57	15–14 (8–6)	Eblen Center (1,522); Cookeville, Tennessee
02/27/2014; 6:00 pm	at Eastern Kentucky	L 67–74	15–15 (8–7)	McBrayer Arena (2,900); Richmond, Kentucky
03/01/2014; 6:30 pm	at Morehead State	W 91–84	16–15 (9–7)	Ellis Johnson Arena (2,905); Morehead, Kentucky
2014 Ohio Valley Conference tournament
03/05/2014; 6:00 pm, ESPN3	vs. SIU Edwardsville; First round	W 74–67	17–15	Nashville Municipal Auditorium (1,123); Nashville, Tennessee
03/06/2014; 6:00 pm, ESPN3	vs. Morehead State; Quarterfinals	L 61–76	17–16	Nashville Municipal Auditorium (1,323); Nashville, Tennessee
*Non-conference game. ^{#}Rankings from AP Poll. (#) Tournament seedings in parentheses. All times are in Central Time.
