= 2013–14 Eastern Kentucky Colonels basketball team =

American college basketball season

2013–14 Eastern Kentucky Colonels men's basketball
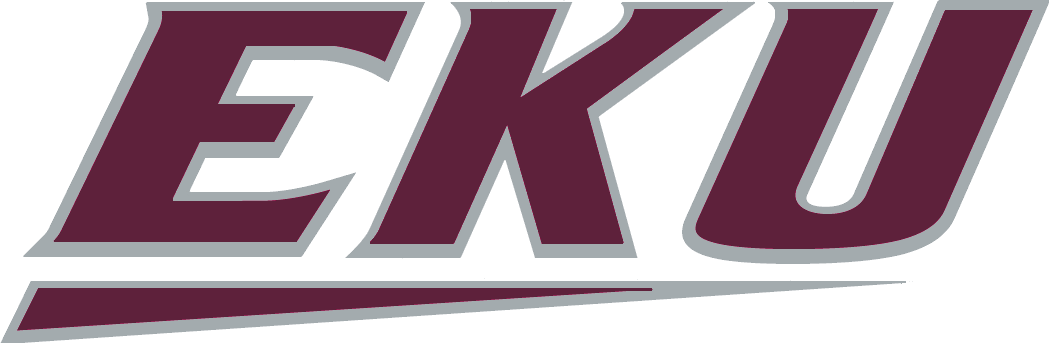

Ohio Valley tournament champions

NCAA tournament, round of 64
- Conference: Ohio Valley Conference
- East Division
- Record: 24–10 (11–5 OVC)
- Head coach: Jeff Neubauer (9th season)
- Assistant coaches: Rodney Crawford; Austin Newton; Luke Strege
- Home arena: McBrayer Arena

2013–14 Ohio Valley Conference men's basketball standings
	Conf.				Overall
Team	W		L	PCT	W		L	PCT
East
Belmont	14	–	2	.875	26	–	10	.722
Eastern Kentucky †	11	–	5	.688	24	–	10	.706
Morehead State	10	–	6	.625	20	–	14	.588
Tennessee Tech	9	–	7	.563	17	–	16	.515
Jacksonville State	4	–	12	.250	10	–	21	.323
Tennessee State	4	–	12	.250	5	–	25	.167
West
Murray State	13	–	3	.813	23	–	11	.676
Southeast Missouri State	8	–	8	.500	18	–	14	.563
Eastern Illinois	7	–	9	.438	11	–	19	.367
SIU Edwardsville	7	–	9	.438	11	–	20	.355
Austin Peay	6	–	10	.375	12	–	18	.400
UT Martin	3	–	13	.188	8	–	23	.258
† 2014 OVC tournament winner Rankings from AP poll

The 2013–14 Eastern Kentucky Colonels basketball team represented Eastern Kentucky University during the 2013–14 NCAA Division I men's basketball season. The Colonels, led by ninth year head coach Jeff Neubauer, played their home games at McBrayer Arena within Alumni Coliseum and were members of the East Division of the Ohio Valley Conference. They finished the season 24–10, 11–5 in OVC play to finish in second place in the East Division. They were champions of the OVC tournament to earn an automatic bid to the NCAA tournament where they lost in the second round to Kansas.

== Roster ==
Number	Name	Position	Height	Weight	Year	Hometown
0	Glenn Cosey	Guard	6–0	182	Senior	Flint, Michigan
1	Robbie Stenzel	Guard	6–5	195	Junior	Winchester, Kentucky
2	Corey Walden	Guard	6–2	206	Junior	Daytona Beach, Florida
3	Monte Burney	Guard	6–1	185	Junior	Clarksville, Tennessee
4	Tommy Matthews	Guard	6–1	180	Sophomore	Clinton, Maryland
5	Isaac McGlone	Guard	6–2	175	Freshman	Lancaster, Ohio
10	Will Gary	Guard	6–1	180	Freshman	Lexington, Kentucky
11	Jaylen Babb-Harrison	Guard	6–2	187	Sophomore	Ajax, Ontario
12	Marcus Lewis	Guard	6–4	185	Senior	Streamwood, Illinois
15	Orlando Williams	Guard	6–4	189	Senior	Cincinnati, Ohio
21	Herb Harrison	Forward	6–7	225	RS–Sophomore	Cleveland, Ohio
22	Timmy Knipp	Guard	6–7	205	Junior	Olive Hill, Kentucky
23	Ryan Parsons	Guard	6–2	197	Senior	Morgantown, West Virginia
24	Jeff Johnson	Forward	6–7	251	Senior	Champaign, Illinois
33	Deverin Muff	Forward	6–8	212	Junior	Strongsville, Ohio
34	Tarius Johnson	Guard	6–5	187	Senior	Jackson, Tennessee
42	Eric Stutz	Forward	6–8	225	Junior	Newburgh, Indiana

== Schedule ==
Date time, TV	Rank^{#}	Opponent^{#}	Result	Record	Site (attendance) city, state
Regular season
11/08/2013*; 5:00 pm		vs. FIU; Kennesaw State Tournament	W 83–61	1–0	KSU Convocation Center (1,412); Kennesaw, Georgia
11/09/2013*; 5:30 pm		at Kennesaw State; Kennesaw State Tournament	W 68–60	2–0	KSU Convocation Center (1,404); Kennesaw, Georgia
11/10/2013*; 1:00 pm		vs. Youngstown State; Kennesaw State Tournament	L 67–75	2–1	KSU Convocation Center (1,101); Kennesaw, Georgia
11/13/2013*; 7:00 pm, OVC Digital Network		Warren Wilson	W 114–45	3–1	McBrayer Arena (4,800); Richmond, Kentucky
11/16/2013*; 8:00 pm, OVC Digital Network		High Point	W 74–67	4–1	McBrayer Arena (5,100); Richmond, Kentucky
11/19/2013*; 7:00 pm, OVC Digital Network		Alabama A&M	W 82–68	5–1	McBrayer Arena (2,300); Richmond, Kentucky
11/22/2013*; 7:00 pm, OVC Digital Network		Brescia	W 95–56	6–1	McBrayer Arena (1,900); Richmond, Kentucky
11/30/2013*; 8:00 pm, ESPN3		at NC State	L 56–75	6–2	PNC Arena (10,221); Raleigh, North Carolina
12/05/2013*; 7:00 pm, Comcast SportsNet		at VCU	L 68–71 ^{OT}	6–3	Stuart C. Siegel Center (7,741); Richmond, Virginia
12/07/2013*; 4:00 pm		at Longwood	W 76–67	7–3	Willett Hall (1,456); Farmville, Virginia
12/14/2013*; 1:00 pm, ESPN3		at No. 4 Wisconsin	L 61–86	7–4	Kohl Center (16,968); Madison, Wisconsin
12/18/2013*; 7:00 pm, OVC Digital Network		North Carolina A&T	W 84–73	8–4	McBrayer Arena (1,850); Richmond, Kentucky
12/29/2013*; 2:00 pm		at IPFW	W 90–68	9–4	Gates Sports Center (1,021); Fort Wayne, Indiana
01/02/2014; 8:00 pm, OVC Digital Network		at Eastern Illinois	W 100–81	10–4 (1–0)	Lantz Arena (415); Charleston, Illinois
01/04/2014; 8:00 pm, Fox Sports Midwest; OVC Digital Network		at SIU Edwardsville	L 79–85	10–5 (1–1)	Vadalabene Center (1,133); Edwardsville, Illinois
01/08/2014; 7:00 pm, OVC Digital Network		Murray State	L 64–77	10–6 (1–2)	McBrayer Arena (1,850); Richmond, Kentucky
01/11/2014; 7:30 pm, OVC Digital Network		at Morehead State	W 76–65	11–6 (2–2)	Ellis Johnson Arena (5,011); Morehead, Kentucky
01/16/2014; 7:00 pm, ESPNU		Belmont	W 74–63	12–6 (3–2)	McBrayer Arena (5,200); Richmond, Kentucky
01/18/2014; 7:00 pm, OVC Digital Network		Jacksonville State	W 60–56	13–6 (4–2)	McBrayer Arena (2,300); Richmond, Kentucky
01/23/2014; 8:00 pm, OVC Digital Network		at Tennessee State	W 94–72	14–6 (5–2)	Gentry Complex (478); Nashville, Tennessee
01/25/2014; 8:00 pm, OVC Digital Network		at Belmont	L 81–84	14–7 (5–3)	Curb Event Center (3,182); Nashville, Tennessee
01/30/2014; 7:00 pm, OVC Digital Network		UT Martin	W 89–66	15–7 (6–3)	McBrayer Arena (1,400); Richmond, Kentucky
02/01/2014; 7:00 pm, OVC Digital Network		Southeast Missouri State	W 79–78	16–7 (7–3)	McBrayer Arena (2,300); Richmond, Kentucky
02/04/2014*; 7:00 pm, OVC Digital Network		Chattanooga	W 74–63	17–7	McBrayer Arena (1,300); Richmond, Kentucky
02/08/2014; 11:00 am, ESPNU; OVC Digital Network		Morehead State	L 79–86	17–8 (7–4)	McBrayer Arena (5,500); Richmond, Kentucky
02/13/2014; 8:00 pm, OVC Digital Network		at Tennessee Tech	L 66–72	17–9 (7–5)	Eblen Center (1,235); Cookeville, Tennessee
02/15/2014; 5:30 pm, OVC Digital Network		at Jacksonville State	W 86–65	18–9 (8–5)	Pete Mathews Coliseum (1,608); Jacksonville, Alabama
02/22/2014; 8:30 pm, OVC Digital Network		at Austin Peay	W 96–75	19–9 (9–5)	Dunn Center (3,491); Clarksville, Tennessee
02/27/2014; 7:30 pm, OVC Digital Network		Tennessee Tech	W 74–67	20–9 (10–5)	McBrayer Arena (2,900); Richmond, Kentucky
03/01/2014; 7:00 pm, OVC Digital Network		Tennessee State	W 70–66	21–9 (11–5)	McBrayer Arena (3,100); Richmond, Kentucky
Ohio Valley Conference tournament
03/06/2014; 9:00 pm, ESPN3		vs. Southeast Missouri State; Quarterfinals	W 84–76	22–9	Nashville Municipal Auditorium (1,323); Nashville, Tennessee
03/07/2014; 7:30 pm, ESPNU		vs. Murray State; Semifinals	W 86–83	23–9	Nashville Municipal Auditorium (3,650); Nashville, Tennessee
03/08/2014; 7:00 pm, ESPN2		vs. Belmont; Championship	W 79–73	24–9	Nashville Municipal Auditorium (2,979); Nashville, Tennessee
NCAA tournament
3/21/2014*; 4:10 pm, TBS	No. (15 S)	vs. No. 10 (2 S) Kansas; Second round	L 69–80	24–10	Scottrade Center (17,955); St. Louis
*Non-conference game. ^{#}Rankings from AP Poll, (#) during NCAA Tournament is seed within region S=South. (#) Tournament seedings in parentheses. All times are in Eastern Time.
