= 2013–14 Eastern Illinois Panthers men's basketball team =

American college basketball season

2013–14 Eastern Illinois Panthers men's basketball
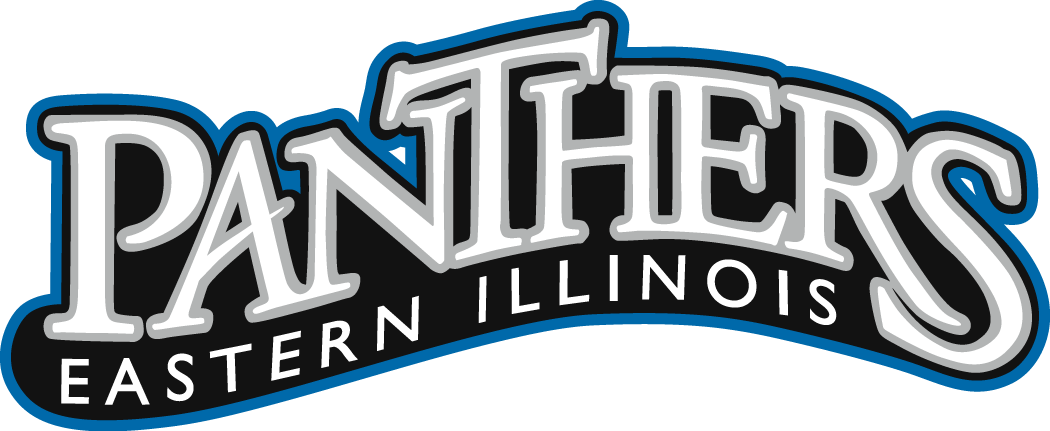
- Conference: Ohio Valley Conference
- West Division
- Record: 11–19 (7–9 OVC)
- Head coach: Jay Spoonhour (2nd season)
- Assistant coaches: Rand Chappell; J.R. Renolds; Marc Stricker
- Home arena: Lantz Arena

2013–14 Ohio Valley Conference men's basketball standings
	Conf.				Overall
Team	W		L	PCT	W		L	PCT
East
Belmont	14	–	2	.875	26	–	10	.722
Eastern Kentucky †	11	–	5	.688	24	–	10	.706
Morehead State	10	–	6	.625	20	–	14	.588
Tennessee Tech	9	–	7	.563	17	–	16	.515
Jacksonville State	4	–	12	.250	10	–	21	.323
Tennessee State	4	–	12	.250	5	–	25	.167
West
Murray State	13	–	3	.813	23	–	11	.676
Southeast Missouri State	8	–	8	.500	18	–	14	.563
Eastern Illinois	7	–	9	.438	11	–	19	.367
SIU Edwardsville	7	–	9	.438	11	–	20	.355
Austin Peay	6	–	10	.375	12	–	18	.400
UT Martin	3	–	13	.188	8	–	23	.258
† 2014 OVC tournament winner Rankings from AP poll

The 2013–14 Eastern Illinois Panthers men's basketball team represented Eastern Illinois University during the 2013–14 NCAA Division I men's basketball season. The Panthers, led by second year head coach Jay Spoonhour, played their home games at Lantz Arena and were members of the West Division of the Ohio Valley Conference. They finished the season 11–19, 7–9 in OVC play to finish in a tie for third place in the West Division. They lost in the first round of the Ohio Valley tournament to Southeast Missouri State.

== Roster ==
Number	Name	Position	Height	Weight	Year	Hometown
2	Donald Moore	Guard	6–1	185	Sophomore	Chicago, Illinois
3	Zach Dickerson	Guard	6–3	190	Freshman	Argyle, Texas
4	Aaron Siler	Guard	5–11	170	Freshman	Robinson, Illinois
5	Reggie Smith	Guard	6–0	185	RS–Junior	Chicago, Illinois
10	Dennis Green	Guard	6–3	185	RS–Freshman	The Bronx, New York
11	Anthony Johnson	Guard	6–4	200	Freshman	Oblong, Illinois
12	Keenan Anderson	Forward	6–7	225	Junior	Marion, Arkansas
15	Sherman Blanford	Forward	6–6	215	Senior	Philadelphia, Pennsylvania
25	Jake Verhagen	Forward	6–6	200	Freshman	Appleton, Wisconsin
30	Dylan Chatman	Guard	6–1	180	Junior	Belleville, Illinois
31	Alex Austin	Guard	6–4	190	Sophomore	Chicago, Illinois
32	Ethan Miller	Guard	6–2	185	Freshman	Charleston, Illinois
33	Luke Piotrowski	Forward	6–11	240	Sophomore	Port Republic, New Jersey
35	Chris Olivier	Forward	6–8	245	Sophomore	Chicago, Illinois
41	Mat Piotrowski	Center	7–2	265	Junior	Port Republic, New Jersey
50	Julian Robertson	Guard	6–3	190	Sophomore	Chicago, Illinois
54	Justin Earls	Forward	6–7	210	Freshman	Chicago, Illinois
55	Josh Piper	Forward	6–8	225	Junior	Champaign, Illinois

== Schedule ==
Date time, TV	Opponent	Result	Record	Site (attendance) city, state
Exhibition
11/02/2013*; 7:30 pm	Oakland City	W 73–64		Lantz Arena (769); Charleston, IL
Regular season
11/09/2013*; 7:30 pm, BTN	at Northwestern	L 55–72	0–1	Welsh-Ryan Arena (5,182); Evanston, IL
11/13/2013*; 7:00 pm	Olivet Nazarene	W 67–60	1–1	Lantz Arena (1,059); Charleston, IL
11/16/2013*; 3:00 pm	at UIC	W 86–66	2–1	UIC Pavilion (3,067); Chicago, IL
11/20/2013*; 6:00 pm, BTN Digital	at Purdue	L 55–83	2–2	Mackey Arena (12,141); West Lafayette, IN
11/23/2013*; 7:00 pm	Roosevelt	W 89–67	3–2	Lantz Arena (675); Charleston, IL
11/27/2013*; 7:00 pm	IPFW	L 65–71	3–3	Lantz Arena (425); Charleston, IL
11/30/2013*; 8:00 pm, ESPN3	at WKU	L 53–68	3–4	E. A. Diddle Arena (4,527); Bowling Green, KY
12/04/2013*; 7:00 pm	at Western Illinois	L 32–60	3–5	Western Hall (1,585); Macomb, IL
12/07/2013*; 2:00 pm	Indiana State	L 48–66	3–6	Lantz Arena (1,255); Charleston, IL
12/19/2013*; 6:00 pm	at Wright State	L 43–70	3–7	Nutter Center (2,911); Fairborn, OH
12/21/2013*; 1:00 pm	at IPFW	L 65–86	3–8	Gates Sports Center (613); Fort Wayne, IN
12/28/2013; 2:00 pm	Tennessee State	W 70–69	4–8 (1–0)	Lantz Arena (391); Charleston, IL
01/02/2014; 7:00 pm	Eastern Kentucky	L 81–100	4–9 (1–1)	Lantz Arena (415); Charleston, IL
01/04/2014; 2:00 pm, WEIU	Morehead State	L 77–85	4–10 (1–2)	Lantz Arena (412); Charleston, IL
01/09/2014; 7:00 pm	at Tennessee Tech	L 69–81	4–11 (1–3)	Eblen Center (1,418); Cookeville, TN
01/11/2014; 4:30 pm	at Jacksonville State	W 56–48	5–11 (2–3)	Pete Mathews Coliseum (2,112); Jacksonville, AL
01/16/2014; 7:00 pm, WEIU	Murray State	L 66–70	5–12 (2–4)	Lantz Arena (1,421); Charleston, IL
01/18/2014; 2:00 pm, WEIU	Austin Peay	W 67–64	6–12 (3–4)	Lantz Arena (864); Charleston, IL
01/23/2014; 7:00 pm	at UT Martin	L 77–84	6–13 (3–5)	Skyhawk Arena (963); Martin, TN
01/25/2014; 5:30 pm	at Southeast Missouri State	W 77–74	7–13 (4–5)	Show Me Center (2,231); Cape Girardeau, MO
01/28/2014*; 7:00 pm	Cleveland State	L 68–82	7–14	Lantz Arena (582); Charleston, IL
02/01/2014; 2:00 pm, WEIU	SIU Edwardsville	W 76–70	8–14 (5–5)	Lantz Arena (1,471); Charleston, IL
02/06/2014; 7:00 pm	UT Martin	W 91–79	9–14 (6–5)	Lantz Arena (1,398); Charleston, IL
02/08/2014; 2:00 pm, WEIU	Southeast Missouri State	L 68–74	9–15 (6–6)	Lantz Arena (1,341); Charleston, IL
02/13/2014; 7:00 pm	at Austin Peay	L 83–88	9–16 (6–7)	Dunn Center (3,104); Clarksville, TN
02/15/2014; 7:30 pm	at Murray State	L 60–72	9–17 (6–8)	CFSB Center (3,846); Murray, KY
02/20/2014; 7:00 pm	at Belmont	L 63–82	9–18 (6–9)	Curb Event Center (2,345); Nashville, TN
02/24/2014*; 7:00 pm, WEIU	at Chicago State	W 84–62	10–18	Lantz Arena (1,252); Charleston, IL
03/01/2014; 1:00 pm	at SIU Edwardsville	W 78–74	11–18 (7–9)	Vadalabene Center (2,096); Edwardsville, IL
2014 Ohio Valley Conference tournament
03/05/2014; 8:00 pm, ESPN3	vs. Southeast Missouri State; First round	L 61–79	11–19	Nashville Municipal Auditorium (1,123); Nashville, TN
*Non-conference game. ^{#}Rankings from AP Poll. (#) Tournament seedings in parentheses. All times are in Central Time.
