= 2013–14 Belmont Bruins men's basketball team =

American college basketball season

2013–14 Belmont Bruins men's basketball

Ohio Valley East Division Champions

NIT Quarterfinals vs. Clemson, L 68–73
- Conference: Ohio Valley Conference
- East Division
- Record: 26–10 (14–2 OVC)
- Head coach: Rick Byrd (28th season)
- Assistant coaches: Brian Ayers; James Strong; Mark Price
- Home arena: Curb Event Center

2013–14 Ohio Valley Conference men's basketball standings
	Conf.				Overall
Team	W		L	PCT	W		L	PCT
East
Belmont	14	–	2	.875	26	–	10	.722
Eastern Kentucky †	11	–	5	.688	24	–	10	.706
Morehead State	10	–	6	.625	20	–	14	.588
Tennessee Tech	9	–	7	.563	17	–	16	.515
Jacksonville State	4	–	12	.250	10	–	21	.323
Tennessee State	4	–	12	.250	5	–	25	.167
West
Murray State	13	–	3	.813	23	–	11	.676
Southeast Missouri State	8	–	8	.500	18	–	14	.563
Eastern Illinois	7	–	9	.438	11	–	19	.367
SIU Edwardsville	7	–	9	.438	11	–	20	.355
Austin Peay	6	–	10	.375	12	–	18	.400
UT Martin	3	–	13	.188	8	–	23	.258
† 2014 OVC tournament winner Rankings from AP poll

The 2013–14 Belmont Bruins men's basketball team represented Belmont University during the 2013–14 NCAA Division I men's basketball season. The Bruins, led by 28th year head coach Rick Byrd, played their home games at the Curb Event Center and were members of the Ohio Valley Conference in the East Division. They finished the season 26–10, 14–2 in OVC play to be champions of the East Division and overall regular season OVC champions. They advanced to the championship game of the OVC tournament where they lost to Eastern Kentucky. As regular season conference champions who failed to win their conference tournament, they received an automatic bid to the National Invitation Tournament where they defeated Green Bay and Robert Morris to advance to the quarterfinals where they lost to Clemson.

== Roster ==
2013–14 Belmont Bruins men's basketball team
Players
Coaches

Pos.	#	Name	Height	Weight	Year	Hometown
F	1	Drew Windler	6 ft 9 in (2.06 m)	215 lb (98 kg)	RS Sr	South Milwaukee, Wisconsin
F	2	Blake Jenkins	6 ft 8 in (2.03 m)	220 lb (100 kg)	RS Sr	Knoxville, Tennessee
G	3	Austin Luke	6 ft 3 in (1.91 m)	185 lb (84 kg)	Fr	Rowlett, Texas
G	4	Holden Mobley	6 ft 3 in (1.91 m)	204 lb (93 kg)	RS Jr	Nashville, Tennessee
G	5	Caleb Chowbay	6 ft 2 in (1.88 m)	175 lb (79 kg)	RS Fr	Mt. Juliet, Tennessee
G	11	Spencer Turner	6 ft 3 in (1.91 m)	190 lb (86 kg)	Jr	Bloomington, Indiana
G	12	Nick Smith	6 ft 8 in (2.03 m)	210 lb (95 kg)	Fr	Bentonville, Arkansas
C	13	Chad Lang	6 ft 11 in (2.11 m)	285 lb (129 kg)	RS Jr	Marietta, Georgia
G	20	Taylor Barnette	6 ft 3 in (1.91 m)	185 lb (84 kg)	So	Lexington, Kentucky
G	21	Burton Sampson	6 ft 4 in (1.93 m)	195 lb (88 kg)	Fr	Knoxville, Tennessee
G	22	Reece Chamberlain	6 ft 1 in (1.85 m)	180 lb (82 kg)	RS Jr	Goodlettsville, Tennessee
G	23	Craig Bradshaw	6 ft 3 in (1.91 m)	210 lb (95 kg)	So	Franklin, Tennessee
G/F	24	J. J. Mann	6 ft 6 in (1.98 m)	214 lb (97 kg)	Sr	Smyrna, Georgia
F	31	Josh Lester	6 ft 5 in (1.96 m)	220 lb (100 kg)	Fr	Antioch, Tennessee
F	35	Evan Bradds	6 ft 6 in (1.98 m)	200 lb (91 kg)	RS Fr	Jamestown, Ohio
F	41	Brandon Baker	6 ft 10 in (2.08 m)	235 lb (107 kg)	Fr	Cincinnati
F	43	Jeff Laidig	6 ft 4 in (1.93 m)	210 lb (95 kg)	So	Mishawaka, Indiana

Head coach

- Rick Byrd (Tennessee)

Assistant coach(es)

- Brian Ayers (Lipscomb)
- James Strong (Vanderbilt)
- Mark Price (Samford)

Legend

- (C) Team captain
- (S) Suspended
- (I) Ineligible
- (W) Walk-on
- Injured
- Current redshirt

Roster
Last update: 2013-9-17

== Schedule ==
Date time, TV	Rank^{#}	Opponent^{#}	Result	Record	Site (attendance) city, state
Regular season
11/08/2013*; 6:00 pm, ESPN3		at Lipscomb; Battle of the Boulevard	W 87–83	1–0	Allen Arena (4,982); Nashville, Tennessee
11/11/2013*; 7:00 pm		at Richmond; Hall of Fame Tip Off	L 61–69	1–1	Robins Center (4,125); Richmond, Virginia
11/14/2013*; 7:00 pm, OVC Digital Network		Indiana State	W 96–95	2–1	Curb Event Center (2,613); Nashville, Tennessee
11/17/2013*; 3:00 pm, ESPNU		at No. 12 North Carolina; Hall of Fame Tip Off	W 83–80	3–1	Dean Smith Center (15,205); Chapel Hill, North Carolina
11/20/2013*; 7:00 pm, OVC Digital Network		Lipscomb; Battle of the Boulevard	W 94–64	4–1	Curb Event Center (4,054); Nashville, Tennessee
11/23/2013*; 6:30 pm		vs. Holy Cross; Hall of Fame Tip Off	W 81–70	5–1	Mohegan Sun Arena (2,073); Uncasville, Connecticut
11/24/2013*; 7:30 pm		vs. Hofstra; Hall of Fame Tip Off	W 85–75	6–1	Mohegan Sun Arena (1,506); Uncasville, Connecticut
11/26/2013*; 7:00 pm, OVC Digital Network		Brescia	W 102–68	7–1	Curb Event Center (1,322); Nashville, Tennessee
12/01/2013*; 4:00 pm		No. 24 VCU; OVC Digital Network	L 68–81	7–2	Curb Event Center (4,811); Nashville, Tennessee
12/03/2013*; 7:00 pm, OVC Digital Network		at Middle Tennessee	W 70–58	8–2	Murphy Center (7,307); Murfreesboro, Tennessee
12/11/2013*; 7:00 pm		Fairfield			Curb Event Center; Nashville, Tennessee
12/14/2013*; 4:00 pm		at South Dakota State	L 72–85	8–3	Frost Arena (2,037); Brookings, South Dakota
12/17/2013*; 9:00 pm		at Denver	L 62–90	8–4	Magness Arena (1,003); Denver, Colorado
12/21/2013*; 11:00 am, ESPNU		at No. 19 Kentucky	L 80–93	8–5	Rupp Arena (24,224); Lexington, Kentucky
12/28/2013*; 12:00 pm		at Indiana State	L 73–85	8–6	Hulman Center (4,837); Terre Haute, Indiana
01/02/2014; 7:00 pm, OVC Digital Network		Jacksonville State	W 78–67	9–6 (1–0)	Curb Event Center (1,790); Nashville, Tennessee
01/04/2014; 4:00 pm, OVC Digital Network		Tennessee Tech	W 64–62	10–6 (2–0)	Curb Event Center (2,520); Nashville, Tennessee
01/09/2014; 7:00 pm, OVC Digital Network		at Southeast Missouri State	W 107–94	11–6 (3–0)	Show Me Center (2,168); Cape Girardeau, Missouri
01/11/2014; 4:00 pm, OVC Digital Network		at UT Martin	W 87–72	12–6 (4–0)	Skyhawk Arena (2,914); Martin, Tennessee
01/16/2014; 6:00 pm, OVC Digital Network		at Eastern Kentucky	L 63–74	12–7 (4–1)	McBrayer Arena (5,200); Richmond, Kentucky
01/18/2014; 7:30 pm, OVC Digital Network		at Tennessee State	W 79–65	13–7 (5–1)	Gentry Complex (2,132); Nashville, Tennessee
01/20/2014*; 2:30 pm, OVC Digital Network		Fairfield *	W 62–53	14–7	Curb Event Center (1,582); Nashville, Tennessee
01/23/2014; 7:00 pm, OVC Digital Network		Morehead State	W 80–66	15–7 (6–1)	Curb Event Center (2,468); Nashville, Tennessee
01/25/2014; 7:00 pm, OVC Digital Network		Eastern Kentucky	W 84–81	16–7 (7–1)	Curb Event Center (3,182); Nashville, Tennessee
01/29/2014; 8:00 pm, OVC Digital Network		at Morehead State	W 76–73	17–7 (8–1)	Ellis Johnson Arena (3,823); Morehead, Kentucky
02/01/2014; 7:30 pm, OVC Digital Network		at Tennessee Tech	L 76–81	17–8 (8–2)	Eblen Center (3,277); Cookeville, Tennessee
02/06/2014; 8:00 pm, OVC Digital Network		Murray State	W 99–96	18–8 (9–2)	Curb Event Center (3,104); Nashville, Tennessee
02/08/2014; 4:00 pm, OVC Digital Network		Austin Peay	W 93–68	19–8 (10–2)	Curb Event Center (3,702); Nashville, Tennessee
02/13/2014; 8:00 pm, OVC Digital Network		Tennessee State	W 73–71	20–8 (11–2)	Curb Event Center (2,007); Nashville, Tennessee
02/20/2014; 7:00 pm, OVC Digital Network		Eastern Illinois	W 82–63	21–8 (12–2)	Curb Event Center (2,345); Nashville, Tennessee
02/26/2014; 7:00 pm, OVC Digital Network		at SIU Edwardsville	W 94–75	22–8 (13–2)	Vadalabene Center (1,644); Edwardsville, Illinois
03/01/2014; 4:30 pm, OVC Digital Network		at Jacksonville State	W 76–53	23–8 (14–2)	Pete Mathews Coliseum (1,806); Jacksonville, Alabama
Ohio Valley tournament
03/07/2014; 6:30 pm, ESPNU		vs. Morehead State; Semifinals	W 86–63	24–8	Nashville Municipal Auditorium (3,650); Nashville, Tennessee
03/08/2014; 6:00 pm, ESPN2		vs. Eastern Kentucky; Championship	L 73–79	24–9	Nashville Municipal Auditorium (2,979); Nashville, Tennessee
NIT
03/18/2014*; 7:15 pm, ESPN3	No. (5)	at (4) Green Bay; First round	W 80–65	25–9	Resch Center (2,770); Green Bay, Wisconsin
03/21/2014*; 8:30 pm, ESPNU	No. (5)	(8) Robert Morris; Second round	W 82–71	26–9	Curb Event Center (2,567); Nashville, Tennessee
03/25/2014*; 6:00 pm, ESPN	No. (5)	at (3) Clemson; Quarterfinals	L 68–73	26–10	Littlejohn Coliseum (10,000); Clemson, South Carolina
*Non-conference game. ^{#}Rankings from AP Poll, (#) during NIT is seed within region. (#) Tournament seedings in parentheses. All times are in Central Time.

* The December 11 game was postponed after Fairfield's flight to Nashville was cancelled to due inclement weather. The game was rescheduled for January 20.
