= 2014 Ohio Valley Conference men's basketball tournament =

- Classification: Division I
- Season: 2013–14
- Teams: 8
- Site: Nashville Municipal Auditorium; Nashville, Tennessee
- Champions: Eastern Kentucky (6th title)
- Winning coach: Jeff Neubauer (2nd title)
- MVP: Corey Walden (Eastern Kentucky)
- Television: ESPNU, ESPN2, ESPN3

2013–14 Ohio Valley Conference men's basketball standings
| | Conf. | | | | Overall |
| Team | W | | L | PCT | W | | L | PCT |
|---|---|---|---|---|---|---|---|---|
East
| Belmont | 14 | – | 2 | .875 | 26 | – | 10 | .722 |
| Eastern Kentucky † | 11 | – | 5 | .688 | 24 | – | 10 | .706 |
| Morehead State | 10 | – | 6 | .625 | 20 | – | 14 | .588 |
| Tennessee Tech | 9 | – | 7 | .563 | 17 | – | 16 | .515 |
| Jacksonville State | 4 | – | 12 | .250 | 10 | – | 21 | .323 |
| Tennessee State | 4 | – | 12 | .250 | 5 | – | 25 | .167 |
West
| Murray State | 13 | – | 3 | .813 | 23 | – | 11 | .676 |
| Southeast Missouri State | 8 | – | 8 | .500 | 18 | – | 14 | .563 |
| Eastern Illinois | 7 | – | 9 | .438 | 11 | – | 19 | .367 |
| SIU Edwardsville | 7 | – | 9 | .438 | 11 | – | 20 | .355 |
| Austin Peay | 6 | – | 10 | .375 | 12 | – | 18 | .400 |
| UT Martin | 3 | – | 13 | .188 | 8 | – | 23 | .258 |
† 2014 OVC tournament winner Rankings from AP poll

The 2014 Ohio Valley Conference men's basketball tournament was held March 5–8 at Nashville Municipal Auditorium in Nashville, Tennessee.

== Format ==
The tournament was an eight-team tournament with the third and fourth seeds receiving a first round bye and the two divisional winners receiving byes through to the semifinals.

The top team in each division, based on conference winning percentage, automatically earned a berth into the tournament. The next six teams with the highest conference winning percentage also earned a bid, regardless of division. The No. 1 seed went to the divisional winner with the higher conference winning percentage, while the No. 2 seed automatically goes to the other divisional winner. The remaining six teams were seeded 3–8 by conference winning percentage, regardless of division.

== Seeds ==
| Seed | School | Conference | Overall | Tiebreaker |
|---|---|---|---|---|
| 1 | Belmont | 14–2 | 23–8 | |
| 2 | Murray State | 13–3 | 18–10 | |
| 3 | Eastern Kentucky | 11–5 | 21–9 | |
| 4 | Morehead State | 10–6 | 19–12 | |
| 5 | Tennessee Tech | 9–7 | 16–15 | |
| 6 | SE Missouri State | 8–8 | 17–13 | |
| 7 | Eastern Illinois | 7–9 | 11–18 | 2–0 vs. SIU Edwardsville |
| 8 | SIU Edwardsville | 7–9 | 11–19 | 0–2 vs. Eastern Illinois |

== Bracket ==
First round Wednesday, March 5
5 | Tennessee Tech | 74
8 | SIU Edwardsville | 67
6 | SE Missouri State | 79
7 | Eastern Illinois | 61

Quarterfinals; Thursday, March 6
4 | Morehead State | 76
5 | Tennessee Tech | 61
3 | Eastern Kentucky | 84
6 | SE Missouri State | 76

Semifinals; Friday, March 7
1 | Belmont | 86
4 | Morehead State | 63
2 | Murray State | 83
3 | Eastern Kentucky | 86

Championship; Saturday, March 8 ESPN2
1 | Belmont | 73
3 | Eastern Kentucky | 79

== See also ==
- 2014 Ohio Valley Conference women's basketball tournament
