= 2013–14 UT Martin Skyhawks men's basketball team =

American college basketball season

2013–14 UT Martin Skyhawks men's basketball
- Conference: Ohio Valley Conference
- West Division
- Record: 8–23 (3–13 OVC)
- Head coach: Jason James (5th season)
- Assistant coaches: Lance Egnatz; Dion Real; Andres Irarrazbal
- Home arena: Skyhawk Arena

2013–14 Ohio Valley Conference men's basketball standings
	Conf.				Overall
Team	W		L	PCT	W		L	PCT
East
Belmont	14	–	2	.875	26	–	10	.722
Eastern Kentucky †	11	–	5	.688	24	–	10	.706
Morehead State	10	–	6	.625	20	–	14	.588
Tennessee Tech	9	–	7	.563	17	–	16	.515
Jacksonville State	4	–	12	.250	10	–	21	.323
Tennessee State	4	–	12	.250	5	–	25	.167
West
Murray State	13	–	3	.813	23	–	11	.676
Southeast Missouri State	8	–	8	.500	18	–	14	.563
Eastern Illinois	7	–	9	.438	11	–	19	.367
SIU Edwardsville	7	–	9	.438	11	–	20	.355
Austin Peay	6	–	10	.375	12	–	18	.400
UT Martin	3	–	13	.188	8	–	23	.258
† 2014 OVC tournament winner Rankings from AP poll

The 2013–14 Tennessee–Martin Skyhawks men's basketball team represented the University of Tennessee at Martin during the 2013–14 NCAA Division I men's basketball season. The Skyhawks, led by fifth year head coach Jason James, played their home games at Skyhawk Arena and were members of the West Division of the Ohio Valley Conference. They finished the season 8–23, 3–13 in OVC play to finish in last place in the West Division. They failed to qualify for the Ohio Valley Tournament.

Head coach Jason James was fired at the end of the season. He had a record of 37–117 in five seasons.

== Previous season ==
The Skyhawks finished the 2012–13 season 9–21, 5–11 in OVC play to finish in a tie for fourth place in the West Division. They lost in the first round of the OVC tournament to Morehead State.

== Roster ==
Number	Name	Position	Height	Weight	Year	Hometown
0	Tobias Dowdell	Forward	6–7	215	Junior	Birmingham, Alabama
1	Dee Oldham	Guard	6–4	180	Sophomore	Lebanon, Tennessee
2	Khristian Taylor	Guard	6–2	175	Junior	Akron, Ohio
3	Terence Smith	Guard	6–4	195	Junior	Russellville, Alabama
4	Bobby Jones	Guard	6–3	185	Senior	Memphis, Tennessee
10	Chandler Rowe	Forward	6–7	205	Freshman	Indianapolis, Indiana
11	Omari Minor	Guard	6–0	175	Senior	Troy, Virginia
12	Mike Liabo	Guard/Forward	6–6	195	Junior	Naples, Florida
15	DeMarc Richardson	Guard	6–2	170	Sophomore	Eads, Tennessee
20	Terrence Durham	Guard	6–3	195	Junior	Memphis, Tennessee
22	Justin Childs	Guard	6–4	190	Senior	New Orleans, Louisiana
25	Marshun Newell	Guard	6–3	195	Junior	Memphis, Tennessee
32	Pierre Mopo	Forward	6–7	245	Senior	Pearl, Mississippi
33	Myles Taylor	Forward	6–7	250	Junior	Little Rock, Arkansas
35	Tim Coleman	Center	6–10	215	Senior	Memphis, Tennessee
40	Jeremy Washington	Forward	6–7	210	Freshman	Saint Croix, U.S. Virgin Islands

== Schedule ==
Date time, TV	Opponent	Result	Record	Site (attendance) city, state
Regular season
11/08/2013*; 8:00 pm	at Wyoming; Global Sports Challenge	L 60–78	0–1	Arena-Auditorium (5,082); Laramie, Wyoming
11/10/2013*; 5:00 pm, P12N	at Colorado; Global Sports Challenge	L 65–91	0–2	Coors Events Center (8,408); Boulder, Colorado
11/13/2013*; 7:00 pm	at Arkansas State; Global Sports Challenge	L 62–72	0–3	Convocation Center (2,237); Jonesboro, Arkansas
11/15/2013*; 11:00 am	Rochester College	W 79–64	1–3	Skyhawk Arena (2,479); Martin, Tennessee
11/17/2013*; 1:00 pm	at Florida State	L 61–89	1–4	Donald L. Tucker Center (6,042); Tallahassee, Florida
11/20/2013*; 7:00 pm	UMKC	L 67–79	1–5	Skyhawk Arena (1,703); Martin, Tennessee
11/22/2013*; 7:00 pm	Jackson State; Global Sports Challenge	L 64–68	1–6	Skyhawk Arena (1,604); Martin, Tennessee
11/25/2013*; 7:30 pm	Lipscomb	L 84–95	1–7	Skyhawk Arena (1,776); Martin, Tennessee
11/27/2013*; 7:00 pm	Bethel (TN)	W 95–82	2–7	Skyhawk Arena (674); Martin, Tennessee
11/30/2013*; 6:00 pm	at UNLV	L 55–85	2–8	Thomas & Mack Center (12,397); Paradise, Nevada
12/04/2013*; 7:00 pm	at Samford	W 89–73	3–8	Pete Hanna Center (1,097); Homewood, Alabama
12/07/2013*; 4:00 pm	Northern Kentucky	W 79–66	4–8	Skyhawk Arena (527); Martin, Tennessee
12/16/2013*; 6:00 pm	at Presbyterian	W 73–70	5–8	Templeton Physical Education Center (211); Clinton, South Carolina
12/19/2013*; 7:00 pm	at Arkansas	L 56–102	5–9	Bud Walton Arena (11,370); Fayetteville, Arkansas
12/21/2013*; 4:00 pm	Southeastern Louisiana	L 76–80	5–10	Skyhawk Arena (817); Martin, Tennessee
12/30/2013; 7:45 pm	at Jacksonville State	L 65–70	5–11 (0–1)	Pete Mathews Coliseum (987); Jacksonville, Alabama
01/02/2014; 7:00 pm	at Austin Peay	L 68–81	5–12 (0–2)	Dunn Center (2,616); Clarksville, Tennessee
01/05/2014; 2:00 pm	at Murray State	L 77–91	5–13 (0–3)	CFSB Center (2,285); Murray, Kentucky
01/11/2014; 4:00 pm	Belmont	L 72–87	5–14 (0–4)	Skyhawk Arena (2,914); Martin, Tennessee
01/13/2014; 7:30 pm	Tennessee State	W 100–81	6–14 (1–4)	Skyhawk Arena (2,090); Martin, Tennessee
01/18/2014; 1:00 pm	at Morehead State	L 75–82	6–15 (1–5)	Ellis Johnson Arena (1,727); Morehead, Kentucky
01/23/2014; 7:00 pm	Eastern Illinois	W 84–77	7–15 (2–5)	Skyhawk Arena (963); Martin, Tennessee
01/25/2014; 4:00 pm	SIU Edwardsville	L 82–87	7–16 (2–6)	Skyhawk Arena (2,686); Martin, Tennessee
01/30/2014; 6:00 pm	at Eastern Kentucky	L 66–89	7–17 (2–7)	McBrayer Arena (1,400); Richmond, Kentucky
02/06/2014; 6:00 pm	at Eastern Illinois	L 79–91	7–18 (2–8)	Lantz Arena (1,398); Charleston, Illinois
02/08/2014; 7:00 pm	at SIU Edwardsville	L 78–84	7–19 (2–9)	Vadalabene Center (1,802); Edwardsville, Illinois
02/12/2014; 6:00 pm, CBSSN	at Southeast Missouri State	W 79–70	8–19 (3–9)	Show Me Center (2,548); Cape Girardeau, Missouri
02/20/2014; 7:00 pm	Tennessee Tech	L 83–91	8–20 (3–10)	Skyhawk Arena (1,044); Martin, Tennessee
02/22/2014; 4:00 pm	Southeast Missouri State	L 74–77	8–21 (3–11)	Skyhawk Arena (2,977); Martin, Tennessee
02/27/2014; 7:00 pm	Murray State	L 72–86	8–22 (3–12)	Skyhawk Arena (2,333); Martin, Tennessee
03/01/2014; 4:00 pm	Austin Peay	L 85–88	8–23 (3–13)	Skyhawk Arena (1,887); Martin, Tennessee
*Non-conference game. ^{#}Rankings from AP Poll. (#) Tournament seedings in parentheses. All times are in Central Time.
