= 2013–14 Murray State Racers men's basketball team =

American college basketball season

2013–14 Murray State Racers men's basketball

OVC West Division champions

CIT champions
- Conference: Ohio Valley Conference
- West Division
- Record: 23–11 (13–3 OVC)
- Head coach: Steve Prohm (3rd season)
- Assistant coaches: William Small; Matt McMahon; James Kane
- Home arena: CFSB Center

2013–14 Ohio Valley Conference men's basketball standings
	Conf.				Overall
Team	W		L	PCT	W		L	PCT
East
Belmont	14	–	2	.875	26	–	10	.722
Eastern Kentucky †	11	–	5	.688	24	–	10	.706
Morehead State	10	–	6	.625	20	–	14	.588
Tennessee Tech	9	–	7	.563	17	–	16	.515
Jacksonville State	4	–	12	.250	10	–	21	.323
Tennessee State	4	–	12	.250	5	–	25	.167
West
Murray State	13	–	3	.813	23	–	11	.676
Southeast Missouri State	8	–	8	.500	18	–	14	.563
Eastern Illinois	7	–	9	.438	11	–	19	.367
SIU Edwardsville	7	–	9	.438	11	–	20	.355
Austin Peay	6	–	10	.375	12	–	18	.400
UT Martin	3	–	13	.188	8	–	23	.258
† 2014 OVC tournament winner Rankings from AP poll

The 2013–14 Murray State Racers men's basketball team represented Murray State University during the 2013–14 NCAA Division I men's basketball season. The Racers, led by third year head coach Steve Prohm, played their home games at the CFSB Center and were members of the West Division of the Ohio Valley Conference.

They finished the season 23–11, 13–3 In OVC play and were OVC West Division champions. They lost in semifinals of the OVC tournament to the eventual champion Eastern Kentucky Colonels.

The Racers were invited to the CollegeInsider.com Tournament where they defeated the Missouri State Bears on the road and the Nebraska–Omaha Mavericks, Towson Tigers, Pacific Tigers, and Yale Bulldogs at home to be crowned the 2014 CIT champions.

== Roster ==
Number	Name	Position	Height	Weight	Year	Hometown
1	Cameron Payne	Guard	6–2	175	Freshman	Memphis, Tennessee
2	Jonathan Fairell	Forward	6–7	265	Junior	Miami, Florida
4	Jarvis Williams	Forward	6–8	210	Junior	Macon, Georgia
11	C.J. Ford	Guard	6–1	185	Sophomore	Fayetteville, North Carolina
12	Tyler Rambo	Forward	6–5	210	Sophomore	Grandview, Missouri
14	Jeff Martin	Guard	5–11	155	Freshman	Katy, Texas
22	T.J. Sapp	Guard	6–3	190	Junior	Ft. Lauderdale, Florida
23	Dexter Fields	Guard	6–2	190	Senior	Orlando, Florida
24	Justin Seymour	Guard	6–3	205	Sophomore	Atlanta
31	Jeffery Moss	Forward	6–4	185	Sophomore	Madison, Alabama
34	Terron Gilmore	Forward	6–7	225	Sophomore	Jackson, Mississippi
35	Zay Henderson	Forward	6–8	245	Sophomore	Monroe, Louisiana

== Honors ==
Cameron Payne was named to the First Team All-OVC and OVC Freshman of the Year; Jarvis Williams was named to the Second Team All-OVC; both were named to the OVC All-Newcomer Team.

As the Racers won the CIT post-season tournament, Cameron Payne and Jarvis Williams were named to the all-tournament first team, and Payne was named tournament MVP.

Cameron Payne was named to the CollegeInsider.com 2013–14 Kyle Macy Freshmen All-America team and a finalist for the Kyle Macy Award as Division I Freshman of the Year.

== Schedule ==
Date time, TV	Opponent	Result	Record	Site (attendance) city, state
Exhibition
11/02/2013*; 7:00 pm, OVCDN	Freed–Hardeman	W 95–68		CFSB Center (2,352); Murray, Kentucky
Regular season
11/08/2013*; 7:30 pm	at Valparaiso	L 74–77	0–1	Athletics-Recreation Center (4,277); Valparaiso, Indiana
11/12/2013*; 7:00 pm, OVCDN	Brescia	W 97–69	1–1	CFSB Center (2,311); Murray, Kentucky
11/15/2013*; 6:00 pm	at Old Dominion	L 60–70	1–2	Ted Constant Convocation Center (5,770); Richmond, Virginia
11/19/2013*; 7:00 pm, OVCDN	Bethel (TN)	W 91–64	2–2	CFSB Center (2,474); Murray, Kentucky
11/23/2013*; 7:00 pm	at Auburn	L 67–75	2–3	Auburn Arena (4,171); Auburn, Alabama
11/26/2013*; 7:30 pm, OVCDN	Middle Tennessee	L 62–80	2–4	CFSB Center (3,347); Murray, Kentucky
11/30/2013*; 9:00 pm, CSS/ESPN3	at Saint Mary's	L 64–89	2–5	McKeon Pavilion (2,506); Moraga, California
12/04/2013*; 7:00 pm, OVCDN	Evansville	W 65–63	3–5	CFSB Center (2,474); Murray, Kentucky
12/07/2013*; 3:00 pm, OVCDN	Lipscomb	W 73–69	4–5	CFSB Center (2,336); Murray, Kentucky
12/17/2013*; 7:00 pm, OVCDN	Southern Illinois	W 73–65	5–5	CFSB Center (3,389); Murray, Kentucky
12/21/2013*; 1:00 pm, Racer TV/ESPN3	at WKU	L 64–71	5–6	E. A. Diddle Arena (4,614); Bowling Green, Kentucky
12/29/2013*; 1:00 pm, FS Ohio	at Dayton	L 51–72	5–7	UD Arena (12,067); Dayton, Ohio
01/02/2014; 7:00 pm, OVCDN	Southeast Missouri State	W 82–75	6–7 (1–0)	CFSB Center (2,319); Murray, Kentucky
01/05/2014; 2:00 pm, CBSSN	UT Martin	W 91–77	7–7 (2–0)	CFSB Center (2,285); Murray, Kentucky
01/08/2014; 6:00 pm, Racer TV/ESPN3	at Eastern Kentucky	W 77–64	8–7 (3–0)	McBrayer Arena (1,850); Richmond, Kentucky
01/11/2014; 7:30 pm, OVCDN	Austin Peay	W 89–67	9–7 (4–0)	CFSB Center (5,272); Murray, Kentucky
01/16/2013; 7:00 pm, Racer TV/ESPN3	at Eastern Illinois	W 70–66	10–7 (5–0)	Lantz Arena (1,421); Charleston, Illinois
01/18/2013; 1:00 pm, FS Midwest	at SIU Edwardsville	L 60–67	10–8 (5–1)	Vadalabene Center (2,787); Edwardsville, Illinois
01/23/2014; 7:00 pm, OVCDN	Tennessee Tech	W 92–53	11–8 (6–1)	CFSB Center (2,285); Murray, Kentucky
01/25/2014; 7:30 pm, OVCDN	Jacksonville State	W 73–65	12–8 (7–1)	CFSB Center (5,028); Murray, Kentucky
01/31/2013; 8:00 pm, CBSSN	at Austin Peay	W 96–88	13–8 (8–1)	Dunn Center (4,283); Clarksville, Tennessee
02/06/2013; 8:00 pm, ESPNU	at Belmont	L 96–99	13–9 (8–2)	Curb Event Center (3,104); Nashville, Tennessee
02/08/2013; 7:00 pm, Racer TV/ESPN3	at Tennessee State	W 73–65	14–9 (9–2)	Gentry Complex (4,381); Nashville, Tennessee
02/13/2014; 7:00 pm, OVCDN	SIU Edwardsville	W 82–72	15–9 (10–2)	CFSB Center (3,814); Murray, Kentucky
02/15/2014; 7:30 pm, OVCDN	Eastern Illinois	W 72–60	16–9 (11–2)	CFSB Center (3,846); Murray, Kentucky
02/22/2014; 7:00 pm, OVCDN	Morehead State	W 69–58	17–9 (12–2)	CFSB Center (5,856); Murray, Kentucky
02/27/2014; 7:00 pm, Racer TV/ESPN3	at UT Martin	W 86–72	18–9 (13–2)	Skyhawk Arena (2,333); Martin, Tennessee
03/01/2014; 5:30 pm, Racer TV/ESPN3	at Southeast Missouri State	L 115–118 ^{2OT}	18–10 (13–3)	Show Me Center (3,607); Cape Girardeau, Missouri
Ohio Valley Conference tournament
03/07/2014; 6:30 pm, ESPNU	vs. Eastern Kentucky; Semifinals	L 83–86	18–11	Nashville Municipal Auditorium (3,650); Nashville, Tennessee
CIT
03/19/2014*; 7:00 pm	at Missouri State; First round	W 66–63	19–11	JQH Arena (2,910); Springfield, Missouri
03/24/2014*; 7:00 pm	Nebraska–Omaha; Second round	W 86–62	20–11	CFSB Center (3,254); Murray, Kentucky
03/27/2014*; 7:00 pm	Towson; Quarterfinals	W 85–73	21–11	CFSB Center (3,063); Murray, Kentucky
04/01/2014*; 8:00 pm, CBSSN	Pacific; Semifinals	W 98–75	22–11	CFSB Center (3,875); Murray, Kentucky
04/03/2014*; 6:00 pm, CBSSN	Yale; Championship	W 65–57	23–11	CFSB Center (4,467); Murray, Kentucky
*Non-conference game. (#) Tournament seedings in parentheses. All times are in Central Time.
