= 2013–14 Austin Peay Governors basketball team =

American college basketball season

2013–14 Austin Peay Governors men's basketball
- Conference: Ohio Valley Conference
- West Division
- Record: 12–18 (6–10 OVC)
- Head coach: Dave Loos (24th season)
- Assistant coaches: Bret Campbell; Corey Gipson; Charles Wells
- Home arena: Dunn Center

2013–14 Ohio Valley Conference men's basketball standings
	Conf.				Overall
Team	W		L	PCT	W		L	PCT
East
Belmont	14	–	2	.875	26	–	10	.722
Eastern Kentucky †	11	–	5	.688	24	–	10	.706
Morehead State	10	–	6	.625	20	–	14	.588
Tennessee Tech	9	–	7	.563	17	–	16	.515
Jacksonville State	4	–	12	.250	10	–	21	.323
Tennessee State	4	–	12	.250	5	–	25	.167
West
Murray State	13	–	3	.813	23	–	11	.676
Southeast Missouri State	8	–	8	.500	18	–	14	.563
Eastern Illinois	7	–	9	.438	11	–	19	.367
SIU Edwardsville	7	–	9	.438	11	–	20	.355
Austin Peay	6	–	10	.375	12	–	18	.400
UT Martin	3	–	13	.188	8	–	23	.258
† 2014 OVC tournament winner Rankings from AP poll

The 2013–14 Austin Peay Governors basketball team represented Austin Peay State University during the 2013–14 NCAA Division I men's basketball season. The Governors, led by 24th year head coach Dave Loos, played their home games at the Dunn Center and were members of the West Division of the Ohio Valley Conference (OVC). They finished the season 12–18, 6–10 in OVC play to finish in fifth place in the West Division. They failed to qualify for the Ohio Valley Tournament.

== Roster ==
Number	Name	Position	Height	Weight	Year	Hometown
1	Fred Garmon	Guard	5–11	175	Junior	Kennett, Missouri
2	Zavion Williams	Guard	5–10	170	RS–Sophomore	Clarksville, Tennessee
4	Travis Betran	Guard	6–3	185	Senior	Harlem, New York
5	Chris Horton	Center/Forward	6–8	195	Sophomore	Decatur, Georgia
10	Will Triggs	Forward	6–6	230	Senior	Edwardsville, Illinois
11	Thomas Greer	Guard	6–5	180	RS–Junior	Atwood, Tennessee
15	Chris Freeman	Forward	6–6	205	Junior	San Antonio, Texas
20	Corey Arentsen	Guard	6–5	185	Sophomore	Breese, Illinois
21	Preston Herring	Forward	6–7	180	Sophomore	Lester, Alabama
22	Damarius Smith	Guard	6–2	190	Junior	Clarksville, Tennessee
23	Serigne Mboup	Forward/Center	6–7	190	Sophomore	Dakar, Senegal
24	Ed Dyson	Forward	6–4	190	Junior	Washington, D.C.
25	Josh Ledbetter	Forward	6–6	200	Freshman	Shepherd, Michigan

== Schedule ==
Date time, TV	Opponent	Result	Record	Site (attendance) city, state
Exhibition
11/04/2013*; 7:00 pm, PNSTVN	Central Missouri	W 78–75		Dunn Center (2,104); Clarksville, TN
Regular Season
11/08/2013*; 7:00 pm, PNSTVN	Oakland City	W 84–69	1–0	Dunn Center (2,105); Clarksville, TN
11/14/2013*; 7:00 pm, CSS	at No. 13 Memphis	L 69–95	1–1	FedExForum (15,785); Memphis, TN
11/19/2013*; 7:00 pm, PNSTVN	Southern Illinois	W 72–70	2–1	Dunn Center (2,505); Clarksville, TN
11/21/2013*; 6:00 pm	at Central Michigan; Central Michigan Tournament	L 75–90	2–2	McGuirk Arena (1,252); Mount Pleasant, MI
11/22/2013*; 3:30 pm	vs. Cal State Northridge; Central Michigan Tournament	L 77–80 ^{OT}	2–3	McGuirk Arena (1,539); Mount Pleasant, MI
11/23/2013*; 4:30 pm	vs. Montana State; Central Michigan Tournament	W 78–72	3–3	McGuirk Arena (1,575); Mount Pleasant, MI
11/30/2013*; 6:00 pm	at Youngstown State	W 88–86	4–3	Beeghly Center (1,460); Youngstown, OH
12/04/2013*; 7:00 pm, PNSTVN	East Tennessee State	L 74–80	4–4	Dunn Center (2,273); Clarksville, TN
12/07/2013*; 12:00 pm	at Samford	L 63–85	5–4	Pete Hanna Center (1,096); Homewood, AL
12/14/2013*; 7:00 pm, PNSTVN	Liberty	W 77–71	5–5	Dunn Center (2,022); Clarksville, TN
12/17/2013*; 8:00 pm, CSS	at Vanderbilt	L 56–58	5–6	Memorial Gymnasium (8,422); Nashville, TN
12/19/2013*; 7:00 pm, PNSTVN	Lipscomb	L 83–88	5–7	Dunn Center (2,307); Clarksville, TN
12/21/2013*; 3:00 pm	at East Tennessee State	L 79–84	5–8	ETSU/MSHA Athletic Center (2,257); Johnson City, TN
12/30/2013*; 7:00 pm, PNSTVN	Dalton State	W 93–57	6–8	Dunn Center (1,886); Clarksville, TN
01/02/2014; 7:00 pm, PNSTVN	UT Martin	W 81–68	7–8 (1–0)	Dunn Center (2,616); Clarksville, TN
01/04/2014; 7:30 pm, PNSTVN	Southeast Missouri State	W 80–74	8–8 (2–0)	Dunn Center (3,186); Clarksville, TN
01/11/2014; 7:30 pm	at Murray State	L 67–89	8–9 (2–1)	CFSB Center (5,272); Murray, KY
01/16/2014; 7:00 pm	at SIU Edwardsville	L 67–71	8–10 (2–2)	Vadalabene Center (1,359); Edwardsville, IL
01/18/2014; 2:00 pm	at Eastern Illinois	L 64–67	8–11 (2–3)	Lantz Arena (864); Charleston, IL
01/23/2014; 7:00 pm, PNSTVN	Jacksonville State	L 59–71	8–12 (2–4)	Dunn Center (2,208); Clarksville, TN
01/25/2014; 7:00 pm, PNSTVN	Tennessee Tech	W 83–69	9–12 (3–4)	Dunn Center (3,133); Clarksville, TN
01/31/2014; 8:00 pm, PNSTVN	Murray State	L 88–96	9–13 (3–5)	Dunn Center (4,283); Clarksville, TN
02/06/2014; 7:00 pm	at Tennessee State	W 75–65	10–13 (4–5)	Gentry Complex (1,528); Nashville, TN
02/08/2014; 4:00 pm	at Belmont	L 68–93	10–14 (4–6)	Curb Event Center (3,702); Nashville, TN
02/13/2014; 7:00 pm, PNSTVN	Eastern Illinois	W 88–83	11–14 (5–6)	Dunn Center (3,104); Clarksville, TN
02/15/2014; 7:30 pm, PNSTVN	SIU Edwardsville	L 68–83	11–15 (5–7)	Dunn Center (2,840); Clarksville, TN
02/19/2014; 6:00 pm	at Morehead State	L 88–90 ^{2OT}	11–16 (5–8)	Ellis Johnson Arena (2,217); Morehead, KY
02/22/2014; 7:30 pm, PNSTVN	Eastern Kentucky	L 75–96	11–17 (5–9)	Dunn Center (3,491); Clarksville, TN
02/27/2014; 7:00 pm	at Southeast Missouri State	L 80–83	11–18 (5–10)	Show Me Center (1,796); Cape Girardeau, MO
03/01/2014; 4:00 pm	at UT Martin	W 88–85	12–18 (6–10)	Skyhawk Arena (1,887); Martin, TN
*Non-conference game. ^{#}Rankings from AP Poll. (#) Tournament seedings in parentheses. All times are in Central Time.

Peay Nation Sports Television Network (PNSTVN) airs across the state on Charter Channel 99, CDE Lightband Channel 9, and U-Verse 99.
