= 2013–14 Southeast Missouri State Redhawks men's basketball team =

American college basketball season

2013–14 Southeast Missouri State Redhawks men's basketball
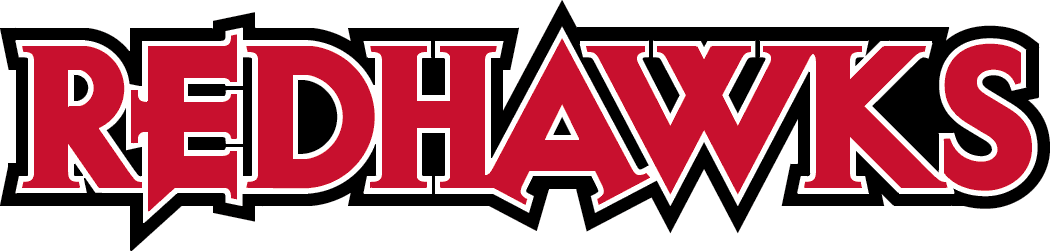
- Conference: Ohio Valley Conference
- West Division
- Record: 18–14 (8–8 OVC)
- Head coach: Dickey Nutt (5th season)
- Assistant coaches: Jessie Evans; Jamie Rosser; Jon Cremins
- Home arena: Show Me Center

2013–14 Ohio Valley Conference men's basketball standings
	Conf.				Overall
Team	W		L	PCT	W		L	PCT
East
Belmont	14	–	2	.875	26	–	10	.722
Eastern Kentucky †	11	–	5	.688	24	–	10	.706
Morehead State	10	–	6	.625	20	–	14	.588
Tennessee Tech	9	–	7	.563	17	–	16	.515
Jacksonville State	4	–	12	.250	10	–	21	.323
Tennessee State	4	–	12	.250	5	–	25	.167
West
Murray State	13	–	3	.813	23	–	11	.676
Southeast Missouri State	8	–	8	.500	18	–	14	.563
Eastern Illinois	7	–	9	.438	11	–	19	.367
SIU Edwardsville	7	–	9	.438	11	–	20	.355
Austin Peay	6	–	10	.375	12	–	18	.400
UT Martin	3	–	13	.188	8	–	23	.258
† 2014 OVC tournament winner Rankings from AP poll

The 2013–14 Southeast Missouri State Redhawks men's basketball team represented Southeast Missouri State University during the 2013–14 NCAA Division I men's basketball season. The Redhawks, led by fifth year head coach Dickey Nutt, played their home games at the Show Me Center and were members of the West Division of the Ohio Valley Conference. They finished the season 18–14, 8–8 in OVC play to finish in second place in the West Division. They advanced to the quarterfinals of the OVC tournament where they lost to Eastern Kentucky.

== Roster ==
Number	Name	Position	Height	Weight	Year	Hometown
0	Josh Langford	Guard	6–7	215	Junior	Huntsville, Alabama
1	Nino Johnson	Forward	6–9	245	Junior	Memphis, Tennessee
3	C. J. Reese	Guard	6–2	195	Freshman	Atlanta
4	Antonius Cleveland	Guard	6–5	175	Freshman	Memphis, Tennessee
10	Kyle Stoder	Guard	6–5	167	Freshman	Leopold, Missouri
11	Michael Porter	Guard/Forward	6–6	235	Senior	Sikeston, Missouri
12	Jamaal Calvin	Guard	6–1	181	Freshman	Chattanooga, Tennessee
13	Lucas Nutt	Guard	6–1	180	Senior	Jonesboro, Arkansas
15	Darrian Gray	Guard	6–5	213	Junior	Memphis, Tennessee
23	Jarekious Bradley	Guard/Forward	6–5	220	Junior	Memphis, Tennessee
24	Will Holifield	Guard	6–0	198	Junior	Sikeston, Missouri
33	Tyler Stone	Forward	6–8	230	Senior	Memphis, Tennessee
41	Caleb Woods	Forward/Center	6–3	180	Junior	Selmer, Tennessee
55	J.J. Thompson	Guard	6–0	185	Junior	Irving, Texas

== Schedule ==
Date time, TV	Opponent	Result	Record	Site (attendance) city, state
Exhibition
10/29/2013*; 7:00 pm	Hannibal–LaGrange	W 115–45		Show Me Center (1,008); Cape Girardeau, Missouri
11/02/2013*; 8:00 pm	Ouachita Baptist	W 88–75		Show Me Center (1,210); Cape Girardeau, Missouri
Regular season
11/08/2013*; 7:30 pm	at Saint Louis	L 64–87	0–1	Chaifetz Arena (7,714); St. Louis, Missouri
11/11/2013*; 8:00 pm	Central Baptist	W 118–56	1–1	Show Me Center (1,292); Cape Girardeau, Missouri
11/16/2013*; 12:00 pm	at IUPUI	W 76–68	2–1	The Jungle (550); Indianapolis
11/18/2013*; 6:00 pm	at Ball State	L 83–87	2–2	Worthen Arena (2,765); Muncie, Indiana
11/22/2013*; 7:00 pm	Mid-Continent	W 109–64	3–2	Show Me Center (1,892); Cape Girardeau, Missouri
11/29/2013*; 6:30 pm	vs. Northern Kentucky; Cure UCD Classic by Plan BC3	W 79–65	4–2	Puerto Vallarta International Convention Center (100); Puerto Vallarta, MX
11/30/2013*; 4:00 pm	vs. Tulane; Cure UCD Classic by Plan BC3	W 102–72	5–2	Puerto Vallarta International Convention Center (100); Puerto Vallarta, MX
12/01/2013*; 4:00 pm	vs. Texas State; Cure UCD Classic by Plan BC3	W 82–74	6–2	Puerto Vallarta International Convention Center (125); Puerto Vallarta, MX
12/07/2013*; 4:30 pm	at Southeastern Louisiana	W 74–73	7–2	University Center (302); Hammond, Louisiana
12/14/2013*; 7:00 pm	UIC	L 69–75	7–3	Show Me Center (1,967); Cape Girardeau, Missouri
12/21/2013*; 7:00 pm, FS South	at No. 15 Memphis	L 65–77	7–4	FedExForum (15,021); Memphis, Tennessee
12/23/2013*; 7:00 pm	IUPUI	W 83–79 ^{OT}	8–4	Show Me Center (1,305); Cape Girardeau, Missouri
12/29/2013*; 2:00 pm	at Missouri State	L 78–81	8–5	JQH Arena (3,889); Springfield, Missouri
01/02/2014; 7:00 pm	at Murray State	L 75–82	8–6 (0–1)	CFSB Center (2,319); Murray, Kentucky
01/04/2014; 7:30 pm	at Austin Peay	L 74–80	8–7 (0–2)	Dunn Center (3,186); Clarksville, Tennessee
01/09/2014; 7:00 pm	Belmont	L 94–107	8–8 (0–3)	Show Me Center (2,168); Cape Girardeau, Missouri
01/11/2014; 5:30 pm	Tennessee State	W 102–94	9–8 (1–3)	Show Me Center (2,053); Cape Girardeau, Missouri
01/16/2014; 6:00 pm	at Morehead State	L 67–80	9–9 (1–4)	Ellis Johnson Arena (2,210); Morehead, Kentucky
01/18/2014; 7:00 pm	at Tennessee Tech	W 83–74	10–9 (2–4)	Eblen Center (2,035); Cookeville, Tennessee
01/23/2014; 7:00 pm	SIU Edwardsville	W 82–78	11–9 (3–4)	Show Me Center (1,769); Cape Girardeau, Missouri
01/25/2014; 5:30 pm	Eastern Illinois	L 74–77	11–10 (3–5)	Show Me Center (2,231); Cape Girardeau, Missouri
01/29/2014*; 7:00 pm	UMKC	W 91–81	12–10	Show Me Center (1,583); Cape Girardeau, Missouri
02/01/2014; 6:00 pm	at Eastern Kentucky	L 78–79	12–11 (3–6)	McBrayer Arena (2,300); Richmond, Kentucky
02/06/2014; 7:00 pm	at SIU Edwardsville	L 88–93 ^{OT}	12–12 (3–7)	Vadalabene Center (1,403); Edwardsville, Illinois
02/08/2014; 2:00 pm	at Eastern Illinois	W 74–68	13–12 (4–7)	Lantz Arena (1,341); Charleston, Illinois
02/12/2014; 6:00 pm, CBSSN	UT Martin	L 70–79	13–13 (4–8)	Show Me Center (2,548); Cape Girardeau, Missouri
02/20/2014; 7:00 pm	Jacksonville State	W 87–70	14–13 (5–8)	Show Me Center (1,568); Cape Girardeau, Missouri
02/22/2014; 4:00 pm	at UT Martin	W 77–74	15–13 (6–8)	Skyhawk Arena (2,977); Martin, Tennessee
02/27/2014; 7:00 pm	Austin Peay	W 83–80	16–13 (7–8)	Show Me Center (1,796); Cape Girardeau, Missouri
03/01/2014; 5:30 pm	Murray State	W 118–115 ^{2OT}	17–13 (8–8)	Show Me Center (3,607); Cape Girardeau, Missouri
Ohio Valley Conference tournament
03/05/2014; 8:00 pm, ESPN3	vs. Eastern Illinois; First round	W 79–61	18–13	Nashville Municipal Auditorium (1,123); Nashville, Tennessee
03/06/2014; 8:00 pm, ESPN3	vs. Eastern Kentucky; Quarterfinals	L 76–84	18–14	Nashville Municipal Auditorium (1,323); Nashville, Tennessee
*Non-conference game. ^{#}Rankings from AP Poll. (#) Tournament seedings in parentheses. All times are in Central Time.
