= 2013–14 SIU Edwardsville Cougars men's basketball team =

American college basketball season

2013–14 SIU Edwardsville Cougars men's basketball
- Conference: Ohio Valley Conference
- West Division
- Record: 11–20 (7–9 OVC)
- Head coach: Lennox Forrester (7th season)
- Assistant coaches: Matt Laur; Deryl Cunningham; Mitch Gilfillan
- Home arena: Vadalabene Center

2013–14 Ohio Valley Conference men's basketball standings
	Conf.				Overall
Team	W		L	PCT	W		L	PCT
East
Belmont	14	–	2	.875	26	–	10	.722
Eastern Kentucky †	11	–	5	.688	24	–	10	.706
Morehead State	10	–	6	.625	20	–	14	.588
Tennessee Tech	9	–	7	.563	17	–	16	.515
Jacksonville State	4	–	12	.250	10	–	21	.323
Tennessee State	4	–	12	.250	5	–	25	.167
West
Murray State	13	–	3	.813	23	–	11	.676
Southeast Missouri State	8	–	8	.500	18	–	14	.563
Eastern Illinois	7	–	9	.438	11	–	19	.367
SIU Edwardsville	7	–	9	.438	11	–	20	.355
Austin Peay	6	–	10	.375	12	–	18	.400
UT Martin	3	–	13	.188	8	–	23	.258
† 2014 OVC tournament winner Rankings from AP poll

The 2013–14 SIU Edwardsville Cougars men's basketball team represented Southern Illinois University Edwardsville during the 2013–14 NCAA Division I men's basketball season. The Cougars, led by seventh year head coach Lennox Forrester, played their home games at the Vadalabene Center and were members of the West Division of the Ohio Valley Conference. They finished the season 11–20, 7–9 in OVC play to finish in a tie for third place in the West Division. They lost in the first round of the Ohio Valley tournament to Tennessee Tech.

== Preseason ==
Five players returned from the 9–18 team of 2012–13; two redshirt transfers, a transfer from a top NCAA Division II program (who had also played in Division I), and four junior college transfers are newly eligible.

During the summer of 2013, Kris Davis and Donivine Stewart, along with assistant coach Deryl Cunningham, were part of a goodwill tour sponsored by Global Sports Academy that spent eight days in Europe, playing games in Belgium, England, and the Netherlands.

After three eligible junior class lettermen did not return for the Fall semester, open tryouts were held on September 13 to fill out the roster with walk-on players. Juniors Akintoye Okunrinboye and Keaton Scheer were added to the team.

== Season ==
During the early season, the Cougars were blown out by some strong teams such as St.Louis and Arkansas, and played close, but mostly lost to more evenly matched opponents. When OVC play began, they came together and became a tough match, gaining upset wins at home over eventual division champion Murray State and OVC tournament champ Eastern Kentucky to go with a couple of road wins. But, as the season wound down, they lost three of the last four while still qualifying for their first OVC tournament, which ended with a first round loss.

At the conclusion of the regular season, Cougars point guard Donivine Stewart was named to the Ohio Valley Conference All-Newcomer Team.

== Roster ==
Source =

Pink background indicates returning players from 2012–13

#	Name	Position	Height	Weight	Year	Hometown	High School	Transfer from
1	Kris Davis	Guard	6–2	190	Junior	Detroit, Michigan	Detroit Cass Technical	
2	Maurice Wiltz	Guard	6–2	190	Junior	Houston, Texas	Stafford HS	Colorado State
3	Keaton Jackson	Forward	6–10	205	Junior	Vancouver, Washington	Prairie High School	Missouri State University– West Plains (JC)
4	Tim Johnson	Guard	6–4	200	Senior	Harvey, Illinois	Lee Academy (ME)	George Washington
5	Grant Fiorentinos	Forward/Center	6–10	225	Sophomore	Cape Town, West Cape, South Africa	Hun School of Princeton (NJ)	Tulane
10	Cameron Craig	Guard	6–0	190	Junior	Coffeyville, Kansas	Field Kindley High School	Coffeyville; Community College (JC)
11	Akintoye Okunrinboye	Guard	5-11	180	Junior	Florissant, Missouri	McCluer North High School	
15	Christian Salecich	Guard	6–3	190	Senior	Gold Coast, Queensland, Australia	Australian Institute of Sport	St. Louis & Missouri Southern (DII)
20	Keaton Scheer	Guard	6-5	188	Junior	Germantown, Illinois	Breese Central High School	Southwestern Illinois College (JC)
23	Rozell Nunn	Guard/Forward	6–4	205	Junior	Kansas City, Kansas	F. L. Schlagle High School	Hutchinson; Community College (JC)
25	Ray Lester	Forward	6–6	235	Senior	Chicago, Illinois	Crete-Monee High School	Vincennes University (JC)
30	Michael Messer	Guard	6–6	215	Junior	Wildwood, Missouri	Lafayette High School	
32	Donivine Stewart	Guard	6–0	195	Sophomore	Peoria, Illinois	Bartonville Limestone; Community High School	Bradley

== Schedule ==
Source =

Date time, TV	Opponent	Result	Record	Site (attendance) city, state
Exhibition
11/04/2013*; 7:00 pm, OVC Digital Network	Greenville	W 97–61		Vadalabene Center (1,307); Edwardsville, IL
Regular season
11/08/2013*; 7:00 pm, RazorVision	at Arkansas	L 65–99	0–1	Bud Walton Arena (12,068); Fayetteville, AR
11/13/2013*; 7:00 pm, FOX Sports Midwest; OVC Digital Network	Saint Louis	L 58–82	0–2	Vadalabene Center (4,007); Edwardsville, IL
11/16/2013*; 7:00 pm, OVC Digital Network	Central Arkansas	W 100–93	1–2	Vadalabene Center (1,535); Edwardsville, IL
11/22/2013*; 5:00 pm, Big Sky Access	vs. UC Davis; Portland State Tournament	L 75–80	1–3	Stott Center (755); Portland, OR
11/23/2013*; 7:30 pm, Big Sky Access	at Portland State; Portland State Tournament	L 74–77	1–4	Stott Center (834); Portland, OR
11/24/2013*; 2:00 pm, Big Sky Access	vs. Loyola–Chicago; Portland State Tournament	L 72–73	1–5	Stott Center (738); Portland, OR
11/26/2013*; 6:00 pm, Pac-12 Network	at Oregon State	L 81–101	1–6	Gill Coliseum (4,823); Corvallis, OR
12/02/2013*; 7:00 pm, FOX Sports Midwest; OVC Digital Network	Texas–Pan American	W 55–49	2–6	Vadalabene Center (1,230); Edwardsville, IL
12/07/2013*; 7:00 pm, OVC Digital Network	Central Michigan	L 64–65	2–7	Vadalabene Center (2,116); Edwardsville, IL
12/14/2013*; 6:00 pm, gomastodons.com	at IPFW	L 75–95	2–8	Gates Sports Center (702); Fort Wayne, IN
12/16/2013*; 7:00 pm, CSU-TV	at Chicago State	L 64–81	2–9	Jones Convocation Center (525); Chicago, IL
12/23/2013*; 7:00 pm, Saluki All Access	at Southern Illinois	L 57–74	2–10	SIU Arena (7,057); Carbondale, IL
12/29/2013*; 2:00 pm, OVC Digital Network	Robert Morris–Springfield	W 102–78	3–10	Vadalabene Center (1,070); Edwardsville, IL
01/02/2014; 7:00 pm, OVC Digital Network	Morehead State	L 63-70	3–11 (0–1)	Vadalabene Center (1,111); Edwardsville, IL
01/04/2014; 7:00 pm, FOX Sports Midwest Plus; OVC Digital Network	Eastern Kentucky	W 85–79	4–11 (1–1)	Vadalabene Center (1,133); Edwardsville, IL
01/09/2014; 7:00 pm, OVC Digital Network	at Jacksonville State	L 52–61	4–12 (1–2)	Pete Mathews Coliseum (1,282); Jacksonville, AL
01/11/2014; 7:30 pm, OVC Digital Network	at Tennessee Tech	L 63–64	4–13 (1–3)	Eblen Center (2,632); Cookeville, TN
01/16/2014; 7:00 pm, FOX Sports Midwest; OVC Digital Network	Austin Peay	W 71–67	5–13 (2–3)	Vadalabene Center (1,359); Edwardsville, IL
01/18/2014; 7:00 pm, FOX Sports Midwest; OVC Digital Network	Murray State	W 67–60	6–13 (3–3)	Vadalabene Center (2,787); Edwardsville, IL
01/23/2014; 7:00 pm, OVC Digital Network	at Southeast Missouri State	L 78–82	6–14 (3–4)	Show Me Center (1,769); Cape Girardeau, MO
01/25/2014; 4:00 pm, OVC Digital Network	at UT Martin	W 87–82	7–14 (4–4)	Skyhawk Arena (2,686); Martin, TN
01/29/2014*; 7:00 pm, OVC Digital Network	Crowley's Ridge	W 77–48	8–14	Vadalabene Center (1,279); Edwardsville, IL
02/01/2014; 2:00 pm, OVC Digital Network	at Eastern Illinois	L 70–76	8–14 (4–5)	Lantz Arena (1,471); Charleston, IL
02/06/2014; 7:00 pm, OVC Digital Network	Southeast Missouri State	W 93–88 ^{OT}	9–15 (5–5)	Vadalabene Center (1,403); Edwardsville, IL
02/08/2014; 7:00 pm, FOX Sports Midwest; OVC Digital Network	UT Martin	W 84–78	10–15 (6–5)	Vadalabene Center (1,802); Edwardsville, IL
02/13/2014; 7:00 pm, OVC Digital Network	at Murray State	L 72–82	10–16 (6–6)	CFSB Center (3,814); Murray, KY
02/15/2014; 7:45 pm, OVC Digital Network	at Austin Peay	W 83–68	11–16 (7–6)	Dunn Center (2,840); Clarksville, TN
02/20/2014; 7:00 pm, OVC Digital Network	at Tennessee State	L 61–66	11–17 (7–7)	Gentry Complex (531); Nashville, TN
02/26/2014; 7:00 pm, FOX Sports Midwest; OVC Digital Network	Belmont	L 75–94	11–18 (7–8)	Vadalabene Center (1,644); Edwardsville, IL
03/01/2014; 5:05 pm, FOX Sports Midwest; OVC Digital Network	Eastern Illinois	L 74–78	11–19 (7–9)	Vadalabene Center (2,096); Edwardsville, IL
2014 Ohio Valley Conference tournament
03/05/2014; 6:00 pm, ESPN3; OVC Digital Network	vs. Tennessee Tech; First round	L 67–74	11–20	Nashville Municipal Auditorium (1,123); Nashville, TN
*Non-conference game. ^{#}Rankings from AP Poll. (#) Tournament seedings in parentheses. All times are in Central Time.
