= 2013–14 NCAA Division I men's basketball rankings =

- Season: 2013–14
- NCAA Tournament: 2014
- Preseason No. 1: Kentucky
- NCAA Tournament Champions: UConn
NCAA Division I men's basketball rankings


Two human polls make up the 2013–14 NCAA Division I men's basketball rankings, the AP Poll and the Coaches Poll, in addition to various publications' preseason polls.

== Legend ==
	Increase in ranking
	Decrease in ranking
	Not ranked previous week
Italics	Number of first place votes
(#–#)	Win–loss record
т	Tied with team above or below also with this symbol

== AP Poll ==
This poll is compiled by sportswriters across the nation. In Division I men's and women's college basketball, the AP Poll is largely just a tool to compare schools throughout the season and spark debate, as it has no bearing on postseason play.

	Preseason Oct 31	Week 2 Nov 11	Week 3 Nov 18	Week 4 Nov 25	Week 5 Dec 2	Week 6 Dec 9	Week 7 Dec 16	Week 8 Dec 23	Week 9 Dec 30	Week 10 Jan 6	Week 11 Jan 13	Week 12 Jan 20	Week 13 Jan 27	Week 14 Feb 3	Week 15 Feb 10	Week 16 Feb 17	Week 17 Feb 24	Week 18 Mar 3	Week 19 Mar 10	Week 20 Mar 17	
1.	Kentucky (27)	Kentucky (2–0) (28)	Michigan State (3–0) (51)	Michigan State (6–0) (56)	Michigan State (7–0) (63)	Arizona (9–0) (63)	Arizona (11–0) (63)	Arizona (12–0) (63)	Arizona (13–0) (60)	Arizona (15–0) (60)	Arizona (17–0) (61)	Arizona (18–0) (61)	Arizona (20–0) (63)	Syracuse (21–0) (65)	Syracuse (23–0) (65)	Syracuse (25–0) (64)	Florida (25–2) (47)	Florida (27–2) (46)	Florida (29–2) (50)	Florida (32–2) (50)	1.
2.	Michigan State (22)	Michigan State (1–0) (22)	Kansas (2–0) (7)	Kansas (4–0) (8)	Arizona (7–0) (2)	Syracuse (9–0) (2)	Syracuse (10–0) (2)	Syracuse (11–0) (2)	Syracuse (12–0) (5)	Syracuse (14–0) (5)	Syracuse (16–0) (4)	Syracuse (18–0) (4)	Syracuse (19–0) (2)	Arizona (21–1)	Arizona (23–1)	Florida (23–2) (1)	Wichita State (29–0) (14)	Wichita State (31–0) (14)	Wichita State (34–0) (15)	Wichita State (34–0) (15)	2.
3.	Louisville (14)	Louisville (1–0) (12)	Louisville (3–0) (7)	Kentucky (4–1)	Kentucky (7–1)	Ohio State (8–0)	Ohio State (10–0)	Ohio State (12–0)	Ohio State (13–0)	Ohio State (15–0)	Wisconsin (16–0)	Michigan State (17–1)	Florida (17–2)	Florida (19–2)	Florida (21–2)	Wichita State (27–0)	Arizona (25–2) (4)	Arizona (27–2) (5)	Villanova (28–3)	Virginia (28–6)	3.
4.	Duke (2)	Duke (1–0) (3)	Kentucky (3–1)	Arizona (5–0)	Syracuse (7–0)	Wisconsin (10–0)	Wisconsin (12–0)	Wisconsin (12–0)	Wisconsin (13–0)	Wisconsin (15–0)	Michigan State (15–1)	Villanova (16–1)	Wichita State (21–0)	Wichita State (23–0)	Wichita State (25–0)	Arizona (23–2)	Syracuse (25–2)	Duke (23–6)	Arizona (28–3)	Arizona (30–4)	4.
5.	Kansas	Kansas (1–0)	Arizona (3–0) (5)	Oklahoma State (4–0) (1)	Ohio State (6–0)	Michigan State (7–1)	Michigan State (8–1)	Michigan State (10–1)	Michigan State (11–1)	Michigan State (13–1)	Wichita State (17–0)	Wichita State (19–0)	San Diego State (18–1)	San Diego State (19–1)	San Diego State (21–1)	Duke (20–5)	Kansas (21–6)	Virginia (25–5)	Louisville (26–5)	Louisville (29–5)	5.
6.	Arizona	Arizona (1–0)	Duke (2–1)	Duke (5–1)	Kansas (6–1)	Louisville (8–1)	Louisville (9–1)	Louisville (11–1)	Oklahoma State (11–1)	Wichita State (15–0)	Villanova (15–1)	Florida (15–2)	Kansas (15–4)	Villanova (19–2)	Villanova (21–2)	San Diego State (22–2)	Duke (22–6)	Villanova (26–3)	Virginia (25–6)	Villanova (28–4)	6.
7.	Michigan	Michigan (1–0)	Oklahoma State (3–0)	Ohio State (4–0)	Louisville (6–1)	Oklahoma State (8–1)	Oklahoma State (9–1)	Oklahoma State (11–1)	Duke (10–2)	Baylor (12–1)	Florida (13–2)	San Diego State (16–1)	Michigan State (18–2)	Cincinnati (21–2)	Kansas (18–5)	Cincinnati (23–3)	Louisville (23–4)	Syracuse (26–3)	Duke (24–7)	Michigan (25–8)	7.
8.	Oklahoma State т	Oklahoma State (1–0)	Ohio State (3–0)	Syracuse (4–0)	Wisconsin (8–0)	Duke (7–2)	Duke (8–2) т	Villanova (11–0)	Wichita State (13–0)	Villanova (13–1)	Iowa State (14–1)	Kansas (13–4)	Oklahoma State (16–3)	Kansas (16–5)	Duke (19–5)	Kansas (19–6)	Villanova (24–3)	Kansas (22–7)	Michigan (23–7)т	Duke (26–8)	8.
9.	Syracuse т	Syracuse (1–0)	Syracuse (3–0)	Louisville (5–1)	Oklahoma State (7–1)	UConn (9–0)	Villanova (10–0) т	Duke (9–2)	Baylor (10–1)	Iowa State (13–0)	Oklahoma State (14–2)	Wisconsin (16–2)	Villanova (17–2)	Michigan State (19–3)	Michigan State (20–4)	Villanova (22–3)	Creighton (23–4)	Wisconsin (24–5)	San Diego State (27–3)т	Iowa State (26–7)	9.
10.	Florida	Ohio State (1–0)	VCU (3–0)	Wisconsin (6–0)	Duke (6–2)	Villanova (9–0)	UConn (9–0)	Wichita State (12–0)	Oregon (12–0)	Florida (11–2)	San Diego State (14–1)	Iowa (15–3)	Michigan (15–4)	Michigan (16–5)	Cincinnati (22–3)	Saint Louis (23–2)	Saint Louis (25–2)	San Diego State (25–3)	Kansas (23–8)	Kansas (24–9)	10.
11.	Ohio State	Florida (1–0)	Memphis (1–0)	Gonzaga (4–0)	Wichita State (8–0)	Kentucky (7–2)	Wichita State (10–0)	Baylor (10–1)	Villanova (11–1)	Oklahoma State (12–2)	Ohio State (15–2)	Oklahoma State (15–3)	Kentucky (15–4)	Duke (17–5)	Iowa State (18–4)	Creighton (21–4) т	Cincinnati (24–4)	Louisville (24–5)	Syracuse (27–4)	Michigan State (26–8)	11.
12.	North Carolina	North Carolina (1–0)	Wisconsin (3–0)	Wichita State (5–0)	UConn (7–0)	Wichita State (9–0)	Baylor (8–1)	Oregon (11–0)	Florida (10–2)	Louisville (13–2)	Baylor (13–2)	Louisville (16–3)	Louisville (17–3)	Creighton (18–3)	Saint Louis (22–2)	Louisville (21–4) т	Virginia (23–5)	Michigan (21–7)	Wisconsin (25–6)	Wisconsin (26–7)	12.
13.	Memphis	Memphis (0–0)	Gonzaga (3–0)	UConn (6–0)	Oregon (7–0)	Kansas (6–2)	Oregon (9–0)	Florida (9–2)	Iowa State (11–0)	San Diego State (12–1)	Kentucky (12–3)	Massachusetts (16–1)	Cincinnati (19–2)	Saint Louis (20–2)	Louisville (19–4)	Michigan State (21–5)	San Diego State (23–3)	Creighton (23–5)	Cincinnati (26–5)	San Diego State (29–4)	13.
14.	VCU	VCU (1–0)	Wichita State (4–0)	Oregon (4–0)	Villanova (7–0)	Baylor (8–1)	North Carolina (7–2)	Iowa State (9–0)	Louisville (11–2)	Kentucky (10–3)	Iowa (14–3)	Kentucky (13–4)	Wisconsin (17–3)	Louisville (18–4)	Kentucky (18–5)	Virginia (21–5)	Wisconsin (22–5)	North Carolina (22–7)	Creighton (24–6)	Syracuse (27–5)	14.
15.	Gonzaga	Gonzaga (1–0)	Michigan (2–1)	Florida (4–1)	Florida (6–1)	Oregon (8–0)	Memphis (7–1)	UConn (10–1)	Kentucky (10–3)	Colorado (13–2)	Kansas (11–4)	Cincinnati (17–2)	Iowa (16–4)	Texas (17–4)	Michigan (17–6)	Iowa (19–6)	Iowa State (21–5)	Cincinnati (24–5)	North Carolina (23–8)	Cincinnati (27–6)	15.
16.	Wichita State	Wichita State (1–0)	Florida (2–1)	North Carolina (4–1)	Memphis (5–1)	Memphis (6–1)	Florida (7–2)	Kansas (8–3)	Kansas (8–3)	Duke (11–3)	Massachusetts (14–1)	Iowa State (14–3)	Iowa State (15–3)	Iowa State (16–4)	Iowa (18–6)	Wisconsin (21–5)	Michigan (19–7)	Iowa State (22–6)	Iowa State (23–7)	Creighton (26–7)	16.
17.	Marquette	Marquette (1–0)	Oregon (2–0)	Iowa State (4–0)	Iowa State (5–0)	Iowa State (7–0)	Iowa State (8–0)	Memphis (8–2)	UConn (11–1)	Oregon (13–1)	Memphis (12–3)	Ohio State (15–3)	Duke (16–4)	Iowa (17–5)	Virginia (19–5)	Iowa State (19–5)	Kentucky (21–6)	Saint Louis (25–4)	Oklahoma (23–8)	New Mexico (27–6)	17.
18.	UConn	Oregon (1–0)	UConn (4–0)	Baylor (4–0)	UCLA (7–0)	North Carolina (6–2)	Kansas (7–3)	Kentucky (9–3)	Memphis (9–2)	Kansas (9–4)	Louisville (14–3)	Duke (14–4)	Pittsburgh (18–2)	Kentucky (16–5)	Creighton (19–4)	Kentucky (19–6)	Michigan State (22–6)	SMU (23–6)	Saint Louis (26–5)	UConn (26–8)	18.
19.	Oregon	UConn (1–0)	New Mexico (2–0)	UCLA (5–0)	Gonzaga (7–1)	Florida (6–2)	Kentucky (8–3)	North Carolina (8–3)	North Carolina (9–3)	Massachusetts (12–1)	Cincinnati (15–2)	Saint Louis (17–2)	Saint Louis (18–2)	Oklahoma State (16–5)	Texas (18–5)	Texas (20–5)	North Carolina (20–7)	UConn (23–6)	Memphis (23–8)	North Carolina (23–9)	19.
20.	Wisconsin	Wisconsin (1–0)	Baylor (3–0)	Creighton (4–0)	Baylor (7–1)	Gonzaga (8–1)	Colorado (10–1)	San Diego State (9–1)	Colorado (11–2)	Iowa (12–3)	Creighton (14–2)	Pittsburgh (16–2)	Creighton (17–3)	Virginia (17–5)	Memphis (18–5)	Michigan (18–7)	Iowa (19–7)	Memphis (22–7)	New Mexico (24–6)	UCLA (26–8)	20.
21.	Notre Dame	Notre Dame (2–0)	Iowa State (3–0)	Memphis (2–1)	Massachusetts (6–0)	Colorado (9–1)	Gonzaga (10–1)	Colorado (10–2)	San Diego State (10–1)	Missouri (12–1)	Colorado (14–3)	Michigan (13–4)	Massachusetts (17–2)	Oklahoma (17–5)	Wisconsin (19–5)	UConn (20–5)	Memphis (21–6)	New Mexico (23–5)	UConn (24–7)	Oklahoma (23–9)	21.
22.	UCLA	New Mexico (1–0)	UCLA (2–0)	Michigan (4–2)	Michigan (5–2)	Massachusetts (8–0)	Massachusetts (9–0)	Iowa (11–2)	Iowa (11–2)	Gonzaga (14–2)	Pittsburgh (15–1)	Kansas State (14–4)	Memphis (15–4)	UConn (17–4)	Ohio State (19–5)	Memphis (19–6)	Ohio State (22–6)	Michigan State (22–7)	Michigan State (23–8)	Ohio State (25–9)	22.
23.	New Mexico	Baylor (1–0)	Creighton (3–0)	Iowa (5–0)	Iowa (5–1)	Iowa (9–1)	Missouri (10–0)	Massachusetts (10–1)	Massachusetts (11–1)	Illinois (13–2)	Duke (12–4)	Memphis (13–4)	Oklahoma (16–4)	Gonzaga (20–3)	SMU (19–5)	UCLA (20–5)	SMU (22–6)	Oklahoma (21–8)	VCU (24–7)	Baylor (24–11)	23.
24.	Virginia	UCLA (1–0)	North Carolina (2–1)	Massachusetts (6–0)	San Diego State (5–1)	Missouri (9–0)	San Diego State (7–1)	Gonzaga (10–2)	Gonzaga (11–2)	Memphis (10–3)	Saint Louis (15–2)	Baylor (13–4)	Ohio State (16–4)	Memphis (16–5)	UConn (18–5)	Ohio State (20–6)	Texas (20–7)	Iowa (20–9)	Ohio State (23–8)	VCU (26–8)	24.
25.	Baylor	Virginia (1–0)	Marquette (2–1)	Marquette (3–1)	Dayton (6–1)	San Diego State (7–1)	Iowa (10–2)	Missouri (10–1)	Missouri (11–1)	Kansas State (11–3)	Oklahoma (13–3)т; UCLA (13–3)т	Oklahoma (14–4)	Texas (16–4)	Pittsburgh (18–4)	Pittsburgh (20–4)	Gonzaga (23–4)	New Mexico (21–5)	Kentucky (21–8)	SMU (23–8)	Saint Louis (26–6)	25.
	Preseason Oct 31	Week 2 Nov 11	Week 3 Nov 18	Week 4 Nov 25	Week 5 Dec 2	Week 6 Dec 9	Week 7 Dec 16	Week 8 Dec 23	Week 9 Dec 30	Week 10 Jan 6	Week 11 Jan 13	Week 12 Jan 20	Week 13 Jan 27	Week 14 Feb 3	Week 15 Feb 10	Week 16 Feb 17	Week 17 Feb 24	Week 18 Mar 3	Week 19 Mar 10	Week 20 Mar 17	
		None	Dropped: Notre Dame (2–1); Virginia (2–1)	Dropped: New Mexico (4–1); VCU (4–2)	Dropped: Creighton (5–2); Marquette (5–3); North Carolina (4–2)	Dropped: Dayton (7–2); Michigan (6–3); UCLA (8–1)	None	None	None	Dropped: UConn (11–3); North Carolina (10–4)	Dropped: Oregon (13–3); Missouri (13–2); Gonzaga (14–3); Illinois (13–4); Kansas State (12–4)	Dropped: Creighton (11–6); Colorado (15–4); UCLA (14–4)	Dropped: Kansas State (14–6); Baylor (13–6)	Dropped: Wisconsin (17–5); Massachusetts (17–4); Ohio State (17–5)	Dropped: Oklahoma State (16–7); Oklahoma (18–6); Gonzaga (21–4)	Dropped: SMU (20–6); Pittsburgh (20–6)	Dropped: UConn (21–6); UCLA (21–6); Gonzaga (23–6)	Dropped: Ohio State (22–8); Texas (21–8)	Dropped: Iowa (20–11); Kentucky (22–9)	Dropped: Memphis (23–9); SMU (23–9)	

== USA Today Coaches Poll ==
The Coaches Poll is the second oldest poll still in use after the AP Poll. It is compiled by a rotating group of 31 college Division I head coaches. The Poll operates by Borda count. Each voting member ranks teams from 1 to 25. Each team then receives points for their ranking in reverse order: Number 1 earns 25 points, number 2 earns 24 points, and so forth. The points are then combined and the team with the highest points is then ranked No. 1; second highest is ranked No. 2 and so forth. Only the top 25 teams with points are ranked, with teams receiving first place votes noted the quantity next to their name. The maximum points a single team can earn is 775.

	Preseason Oct 17	Week 2 Nov 11	Week 3 Nov 18	Week 4 Nov 25	Week 5 Dec 2	Week 6 Dec 9	Week 7 Dec 16	Week 8 Dec 23	Week 9 Dec 30	Week 10 Jan 6	Week 11 Jan 13	Week 12 Jan 20	Week 13 Jan 27	Week 14 Feb 3	Week 15 Feb 10	Week 16 Feb 17	Week 17 Feb 24	Week 18 Mar 3	Week 19 Mar 10	Week 20 Mar 17	Final Apr 7	
1.	Kentucky (16)	Kentucky (2–0) (19)	Michigan State (3–0) (22)	Michigan State (6–0) (30)	Michigan State (7–0) (31)	Arizona (9–0) (30)	Arizona (11–0) (30)	Arizona (12–0) (30)	Arizona (13–0) (30)	Arizona (15–0) (30)	Arizona (17–0) (30)	Arizona (18–0) (30)	Arizona (20–0) (31)	Syracuse (21–0) (32)	Syracuse (23–0) (32)	Syracuse (25–0) (32)	Florida (25–2) (24)	Florida (27–2) (25)	Florida (29–2) (25)	Florida (32–2) (26)	UConn (32–8) (30)	1.
2.	Michigan State (3)	Michigan State (1–0) (2)	Louisville (3–0) (8)	Kansas (4–0) (2)	Arizona (7–0) (1)	Ohio State (8–0) (1)	Ohio State (10–0) (1) т	Syracuse (11–0) (1)	Syracuse (12–0) (1)	Syracuse (14–0) (1)	Syracuse (16–0) (1)	Syracuse (18–0) (2)	Syracuse (19–0) (1)	Wichita State (23–0)	Wichita State (25–0)	Florida (23–2)	Wichita State (29–0) (8)	Wichita State (31–0) (7)	Wichita State (34–0) (7)	Wichita State (34–0) (6)	Kentucky (29–11) (1)	2.
3.	Louisville (10)	Louisville (1–0) (9)	Kansas (2–0) (2)	Arizona (5–0)	Ohio State (6–0)	Syracuse (9–0) (1)	Syracuse (10–0) (1) т	Ohio State (12–0) (1)	Ohio State (13–0) (1)	Ohio State (15–0) (1)	Wisconsin (16–0)	Michigan State (17–1)	Wichita State (21–0)	Arizona (21–1)	Arizona (23–1)	Wichita State (27–0)	Arizona (25–2)	Arizona (27–2)	Villanova (28–3)	Louisville (29–5)	Florida (36–3)	3.
4.	Duke (3)	Duke (1–0) (2)	Arizona (3–0)	Kentucky (4–1)	Kentucky (7–1)	Louisville (8–1)	Louisville (9–1)	Louisville (11–1)	Michigan State (11–1)	Michigan State (13–1) т	Michigan State (15–1) (1)	Wichita State (19–0)	Florida (17–2)	Florida (19–2)	Florida (21–2)	Arizona (23–2)	Louisville (23–4)	Duke (23–6)	Arizona (28–3)	Virginia (28–6)	Wisconsin (30–8)	4.
5.	Arizona	Arizona (1–0)	Kentucky (3–1)	Duke (5–1)	Syracuse (7–0)	Michigan State (7–1)	Michigan State (8–1)	Michigan State (10–1)	Wisconsin (13–0)	Wisconsin (15–0) т	Wichita State (17–0)	Villanova (16–1)	San Diego State (18–1)	San Diego State (19–1)	San Diego State (21–1)	Louisville (21–4)	Syracuse (25–2)	Virginia (25–5)	Louisville (26–5)	Arizona (30–4)	Arizona (33–5)	5.
6.	Kansas	Kansas (1–0)	Duke (2–1)	Ohio State (4–0)	Louisville (6–1)	Wisconsin (10–0)	Wisconsin (12–0)	Wisconsin (12–0)	Oklahoma State (11–1)	Wichita State (15–0)	Villanova (15–1)	Florida (15–2)	Michigan State (18–2)	Villanova (19–2)	Villanova (21–2)	Duke (20–5)	Kansas (21–6)	Villanova (26–3)	Duke (24–7)	Duke (26–8)	Michigan (28–9)	6.
7.	Syracuse	Syracuse (1–0)	Syracuse (3–0)	Syracuse (4–0)	Kansas (6–1)	Duke (7–2)	Oklahoma State (9–1)	Oklahoma State (11–1)	Wichita State (13–0)	Iowa State (13–0)	Florida (13–2)	San Diego State (16–1)	Kansas (15–4) т	Cincinnati (21–2)	Kansas (18–5)	San Diego State (22–2)	Duke (22–6)	Syracuse (26–3)	San Diego State (27–3)	Villanova (28–4)	Wichita State (35–1) (1)	7.
8.	Florida	Michigan (1–0)	Ohio State (3–0)	Oklahoma State (4–0)	Duke (6–2)	Wichita State (9–0)	Duke (7–2)	Wichita State (12–0)	Duke (10–2)	Louisville (13–2)	Oklahoma State (14–2)	Wisconsin (16–2)	Louisville (17–3) т	Michigan State (19–3)	Louisville (19–4)	Kansas (19–6)	Saint Louis (25–2)	Kansas (22–7)	Virginia (25–6)	Michigan (25–8)	Michigan State (29–9)	8.
9.	Michigan	Ohio State (1–0)	Oklahoma State (3–0)	Louisville (5–1)	Wisconsin (8–0)	Oklahoma State (8–1)	Wichita State (10–0)	Duke (9–2)	Oregon (12–0)	Baylor (12–1)	Ohio State (15–2)	Louisville (16–3)	Villanova (17–2)	Kansas (16–5)	Duke (19–5)	Cincinnati (23–3)	Villanova (24–3)	Louisville (24–5)	Michigan (23–7)	Iowa State (26–7)	Louisville (31–6)	9.
10.	Ohio State	Florida (1–0)	VCU (3–0)	Gonzaga (4–0)	Wichita State (8–0)	Kentucky (7–2)	UConn (9–0)	Oregon (11–0)	Louisville (11–2)	Villanova (13–1)	Iowa State (14–1)	Iowa (15–3)	Oklahoma State (16–3)	Louisville (18–4)	Michigan State (20–4)	Saint Louis (23–2)	Creighton (23–4)	San Diego State (25–3)	Kansas (23–8)	Kansas (24–9)	Virginia (30–7)	10.
11.	North Carolina	North Carolina (1–0)	Memphis (1–0)	Wisconsin (6–0)	Oklahoma State (7–1)	Oregon (8–0)	Oregon (9–0)	Villanova (11–0)	Baylor (10–1)	Florida (12–2)	San Diego State (14–1)	Kansas (13–4)	Kentucky (15–4)	Duke (17–5)	Cincinnati (22–3)	Villanova (22–3)	Virginia (23–5)	Wisconsin (24–5)	Syracuse (27–4)	San Diego State (29–4)	Iowa State (28–8)	11.
12.	Oklahoma State	Oklahoma State (1–0)	Gonzaga (3–0)	Wichita State (5–0)	Florida (6–1)	UConn (9–0)	Villanova (10–0)	Baylor (10–1)	Iowa State (11–0)	Oklahoma State (12–2)	Kentucky (12–3)	Massachusetts (16–1) т	Iowa (16–4)	Creighton (18–3)	Saint Louis (22–2)	Creighton (21–4)	Cincinnati (24–4)	Michigan (21–7)	Cincinnati (26–5)	Syracuse (27–5)	San Diego State (31–5)	12.
13.	Memphis	Memphis (0–0)	Michigan (2–1)	Florida (4–1)	Oregon (7–0)	Kansas (6–2)	Iowa State (8–0)	Iowa State (9–0)	Florida (10–2)	Duke (11–3) т	Baylor (13–2)	Oklahoma State (15–3) т	Wisconsin (17–3)	Iowa (17–5)	Kentucky (18–5)	Virginia (21–5)	San Diego State (23–3)	Creighton (23–5)	Wisconsin (25–6)	Michigan State (26–8)	Villanova (29–5)	13.
14.	Gonzaga	VCU (1–0)	Florida (2–1)	UConn (6–0)	UConn (7–0)	Villanova (9–0)	Memphis (7–1)	Florida (9–2)	Villanova (11–1)	Oregon (13–1) т	Louisville (14–3)	Kentucky (13–4)	Michigan (15–4)	Kentucky (16–5)	Iowa State (18–4)	Michigan State (21–5)	Wisconsin (22–5)	North Carolina (22–7)	Creighton (24–6)	Cincinnati (27–6)	Kansas (25–10)	14.
15.	VCU	Gonzaga (1–0)	Wisconsin (3–0)	Oregon (4–0)	Memphis (5–1) т	Memphis (6–1)	Baylor (8–1) т	UConn (10–1)	UConn (11–1)	San Diego State (12–1)	Massachusetts (14–1)	Ohio State (15–3)	Cincinnati (19–2)	Saint Louis (20–2)	Iowa (18–6)	Iowa (19–6)	Kentucky (21–6)	Cincinnati (24–5)	North Carolina (23–8)	Wisconsin (26–7)	UCLA (28–9)	15.
16.	Wichita State	Wichita State (1–0)	Wichita State (4–0)	North Carolina (4–1)	Gonzaga (7–1) т	Gonzaga (8–1) т	Gonzaga (10–1) т	Kansas (8–3)	Kentucky (10–3)	Kentucky (10–3)	Iowa (14–3)	Cincinnati (17–2)	Duke (16–4)	Michigan (16–5)	Virginia (19–5)	Kentucky (19–6)	Michigan (19–7)	Saint Louis (25–4)	Iowa State (23–7)	Creighton (26–7)	Duke (26–9)	16.
17.	Marquette	Marquette (1–0)	Oregon (2–0)	Baylor (4–0)	UCLA (7–0)	Iowa State (7–0) т	Florida (7–2)	Memphis (8–2)	Kansas (8–3)	Colorado (13–2)	Memphis (12–3)	Iowa State (14–3)	Pittsburgh (18–2)	Iowa State (16–4)	Creighton (19–4)	Texas (20–5)	Iowa State (21–5)	Iowa State (22–6)	Saint Louis (26–5)	New Mexico (27–6)	Syracuse (28–6)	17.
18.	Oregon	Oregon (1–0)	UConn (4–0)	Creighton (4–0)	Iowa State (5–0)	Baylor (8–1)	North Carolina (7–2)	Kentucky (9–3)	Memphis (9–2)	Gonzaga (14–2)	Kansas (11–4)	Duke (14–4)	Iowa State (15–3)	Texas (17–4)	Michigan (17–6)	Wisconsin (21–5)	Michigan State (22–6)	SMU (23–6)	Oklahoma (23–8)	North Carolina (23–9)	Baylor (26–12) т	18.
19.	UConn	Wisconsin (1–0)	North Carolina (2–1)	Memphis (2–1)	Villanova (7–0)	Florida (6–2)	Kansas (7–3)	North Carolina (8–3)	North Carolina (9–3) т	Massachusetts (12–1)	Creighton (14–2)	Pittsburgh (16–2)	Massachusetts (17–2)	Oklahoma State (16–5)	Texas (18–5)	Iowa State (19–5)	Iowa (19–7)	UConn (23–6)	Memphis (23–8)	UConn (26–8)	Dayton (26–11) т	19.
20.	New Mexico	UConn (1–0)	New Mexico (2–0)	Michigan (4–2)	Baylor (7–1)	Massachusetts (8–0)	Massachusetts (9–0)	San Diego State (9–1)	San Diego State (10–1) т	Kansas (9–4)	Duke (12–4)	Saint Louis (17–2)	Creighton (17–3)	Gonzaga (20–3)	Ohio State (19–5)	Michigan (18–7)	Ohio State (22–6)	Memphis (22–7)	New Mexico (24–6)	Oklahoma (23–9)	Creighton (27–8)	20.
21.	Wisconsin	New Mexico (1–0)	Baylor (3–0)	UCLA (5–0)	Michigan (5–2)	North Carolina (6–2)	Kentucky (8–3)	Gonzaga (10–2)	Gonzaga (11–2)	Missouri (12–1)	Pittsburgh (15–1)	Gonzaga (16–3)	Saint Louis (18–2)	Virginia (17–5)	Wisconsin (19–5)	UConn (20–5)	North Carolina (20–7)	New Mexico (23–5)	UConn (24–7)	Saint Louis (26–6)	North Carolina (24–10)	21.
22.	Notre Dame	Notre Dame (2–0)	Indiana (4–0)	Iowa State (4–0)	Massachusetts (6–0)	Iowa (9–1)	UCLA (9–1)	Massachusetts (10–1)	Massachusetts (11–1)	Memphis (10–3)	Colorado (14–3)	Memphis (13–4)	Memphis (15–4)	Pittsburgh (18–4)	Memphis (18–5)	Gonzaga (23–4)	Memphis (21–6)	Michigan State (22–7)	Michigan State (23–8)	Kentucky (24–10)	Cincinnati (27–7)	22.
23.	UCLA	Indiana (1–0)	Creighton (3–0)	Iowa (5–0)	Indiana (6–1)	UCLA (8–1)	San Diego State (7–1)	Iowa (11–2)	Iowa (11–2)	Creighton (12–2) т	Cincinnati (15–2)	Baylor (13–4)	Ohio State (16–4)	Oklahoma (17–5)	Pittsburgh (20–4)	Ohio State (20–6)	Texas (20–7)	Oklahoma (21–8)	SMU (23–8)	UCLA (26–8)	Tennessee (24–13)	23.
24.	Indiana	UCLA (1–0)	UCLA (2–0)	VCU (4–2)	Iowa (7–1)	San Diego State (7–1)	Colorado (10–1)	Colorado (10–2)	Colorado (11–2)	Iowa (12–3) т	Gonzaga (14–3)	Creighton (15–3)	Gonzaga (18–3)	Wisconsin (17–5)	Gonzaga (21–4)	Memphis (19–6)	SMU (22–6)	Kentucky (21–8)	Ohio State (23–8)	Ohio State (25–9)	Stanford (23–13)	24.
25.	Virginia	Virginia (1–0) т Baylor (1–0) т	Iowa (4–0)	Indiana (5–1)	North Carolina (4–2)	Michigan (6–3)	Missouri (10–0)	Missouri (10–1)	Missouri (11–1)	UCLA (12–2)	UCLA (13–3)	Michigan (13–4) т Oklahoma (14–4) т	Oklahoma (16–4)	Ohio State (17–5)	Oklahoma (18–6)	UCLA (20–5)	Oklahoma (20–7)	Iowa (20–9)	VCU (24–7)	VCU (26–8)	Saint Louis (27–7)	25.
	Preseason Oct 17	Week 2 Nov 11	Week 3 Nov 18	Week 4 Nov 25	Week 5 Dec 2	Week 6 Dec 9	Week 7 Dec 16	Week 8 Dec 23	Week 9 Dec 30	Week 10 Jan 6	Week 11 Jan 13	Week 12 Jan 20	Week 13 Jan 27	Week 14 Feb 3	Week 15 Feb 10	Week 16 Feb 17	Week 17 Feb 24	Week 18 Mar 3	Week 19 Mar 10	Week 20 Mar 17	Final Apr 7	
		None	Dropped: Marquette (2–1); Notre Dame (2–1); Virginia (2–1)	Dropped: New Mexico (4–1)	Dropped: Creighton (5–2); Virginia Commonwealth (6–2)	Dropped: Indiana (7–2)	Dropped: Iowa (10–2); Michigan (6–4)	Dropped: UCLA (10–2)	None	Dropped: UConn (11–3); North Carolina (10–4)	Dropped: Oregon (13–3); Missouri (13–2)	Dropped: Colorado (15–4); UCLA (14–4)	Dropped: Baylor (13–6)	Dropped: Massachusetts (17–4); Memphis (16–5)	Dropped: Oklahoma State (16–7)	Dropped: Pittsburgh (20–6); Oklahoma (19–7)	Dropped: UConn (21–6); Gonzaga (23–6); UCLA (21–6)	Dropped: Ohio State (22–8); Texas (21–8)	Dropped: Iowa (20–11); Kentucky (22–9)	Dropped: Memphis (23–9); SMU (23–9)	Dropped: New Mexico (27–7); Oklahoma (23–10); Ohio State (25–10); VCU (26–9)	

== See also ==
- 2013–14 NCAA Division I women's basketball rankings
