= 2013–14 South Florida Bulls men's basketball team =

American college basketball season

2013–14 South Florida Bulls men's basketball
- Conference: American Athletic Conference
- Record: 12–20 (3–15 The American)
- Head coach: Stan Heath
- Assistant coaches: Donnie Marsh; Steve Roccaforte; Mike Wells
- Home arena: USF Sun Dome

2013–14 American Athletic Conference men's basketball standings
	Conf.				Overall
Team	W		L	PCT	W		L	PCT
No. 5 Louisville* †	15	–	3	.833	31	–	6	.838
No. 15 Cincinnati	15	–	3	.833	27	–	7	.794
No. 18 UConn	12	–	6	.667	32	–	8	.800
SMU	12	–	6	.667	27	–	10	.730
Memphis	12	–	6	.667	24	–	10	.706
Houston	8	–	10	.444	17	–	16	.515
Rutgers	5	–	13	.278	12	–	21	.364
UCF	4	–	14	.222	13	–	18	.419
Temple	4	–	14	.222	9	–	22	.290
South Florida	3	–	15	.167	12	–	20	.375
† The American Tournament winner As of March 15th, 2014; *Louisville: 29 reg. season games, 3 postseason games vacated due to sanctions against the program; Disputed Record-(31-6)(15-3); Rankings from AP poll

The 2013–14 South Florida Bulls men's basketball team represented the University of South Florida Bulls during the 2013–14 NCAA Division I men's basketball season. This was the 43rd season of Basketball for USF, and the first as a member of the American Athletic Conference. The Bulls were coached by Stan Heath, who was in his seventh season. The Bulls played home games at the USF Sun Dome. They finished the season 12–20, 3–15 in AAC play to finish in last place. They lost in the first round of the AAC tournament to Rutgers.

At the end of the season, head coach Stan Heath was fired after posting a record of 97–128 in six seasons. He was replaced by former Kentucky assistant Orlando Antigua.

== Off season ==
As of July 1, 2013, USF became a member of the American Athletic Conference, the result of a split in the old Big East.

USF was selected to participate in the 2013 Continental Tire Las Vegas Classic, which takes place December 22–23 at Orleans Arena.

At American Athletic Conference Media day, USF was selected by the coaches to finish 8th out of 10. Senior forward, Victor Rudd, and junior point guard, Anthony Collins, were both selected at media day to the American Athletic Conference Preseason All-Conference Second Team.

=== Departures ===
#	Name	Position	Height	Weight	Year	Hometown	Notes
4	Mike Dakkak	Guard	6–0	180	Senior	Sarasota, FL	Graduated
5	Jawanza Poland	Guard	6–4	204	Senior	Wichita, KS	Graduated
10	Mike McCloskey	Guard	6–0	164	Senior	Orlando, FL	Graduated
22	Shaun Noriega	Guard	6–4	207	Senior	Sarasota, FL	Transferred to Texas-Pan American
32	Toarlyn Fitzpatrick	Forward	6–8	245	Senior	Tampa, FL	Graduated
33	Kore White	Forward	6–8	241	RS Senior	Fort Lauderdale, FL	Graduated

=== Incoming recruits ===
#	Name	Position	Height	Weight	Year	Previous School	Hometown	Notes
4	Corey Allen Jr.	Guard	6–1	152	Junior	Mt. San Antonio College/Ritenour HS	St. Louis, MO	Junior College Transfer
5	John Egbunu	Center	6–10	245	Freshman	Ft. Walton Beach HS	Ft. Walton Beach, FL	
10	Josh Heath	Guard	6-2	165	Freshman	Tampa Prep	Tampa, FL	
23	Chris Perry	Forward/Center	6–8	266	Freshman	Bartow Senior HS	Bartow, FL	
24	Dre Clayton	Forward	6–6	245	Freshman	Maynard Evans HS	Orlando, FL	
30	Bo Zeigler	Guard/Forward	6–6	198	Freshman	Community HS	Detroit, MI	

== Season highlights ==
Freshman, Chris Perry received honors early in the season, being named the American Athletic Conference Rookie of the Week in the first week for his effort against Tennessee Tech. Perry scored 14 points, recorded 7 rebounds, 2 blocks, and 2 steals. The following week, Corey Allen Jr. was named to the American Athletic Conference Weekly Honor Roll for his effort against Bethune-Cookman and Bowling Green in which he averaged 20 points, 7 rebounds, and 6 assists.

== Roster ==
2013–14 South Florida Bulls men's basketball team
Players
Coaches

Pos.	#	Name	Height	Weight	Year	Hometown
G	0	Martino Brock	6 ft 5 in (1.96 m)	205 lb (93 kg)	Sr	Memphis, TN
G	1	Musa Abdul-Aleem	6 ft 5 in (1.96 m)	221 lb (100 kg)	Sr	Atlanta, GA
F	2	Victor Rudd	6 ft 9 in (2.06 m)	235 lb (107 kg)	RS Sr	Los Angeles, CA
F	3	Zach LeDay	6 ft 7 in (2.01 m)	245 lb (111 kg)	So	The Colony, TX
G	4	Corey Allen Jr.	6 ft 1 in (1.85 m)	152 lb (69 kg)	Jr	St. Louis, MO
C	5	John Egbunu	6 ft 10 in (2.08 m)	245 lb (111 kg)	Fr	Ft. Walton Beach, FL
G	10	Josh Heath	6 ft 2 in (1.88 m)	165 lb (75 kg)	Fr	Tampa, FL
G	11	Anthony Collins	6 ft 1 in (1.85 m)	175 lb (79 kg)	Jr	Houston, TX
G	15	Shemiye McLendon	6 ft 3 in (1.91 m)	217 lb (98 kg)	RS Jr	Vero Beach, FL
G	21	Javontae Hawkins	6 ft 5 in (1.96 m)	205 lb (93 kg)	So	Flint, MI
F/C	23	Chris Perry	6 ft 8 in (2.03 m)	266 lb (121 kg)	Fr	Bartow, FL
F	24	Dre Clayton	6 ft 6 in (1.98 m)	245 lb (111 kg)	Fr	Orlando, FL
G/F	30	Bo Zeigler	6 ft 6 in (1.98 m)	198 lb (90 kg)	RS Fr	Detroit, MI
C	35	Jordan Omogbehin	7 ft 3 in (2.21 m)	315 lb (143 kg)	RS So	Lagos, Nigeria

Head coach

- Stan Heath

Assistant coach(es)

- Donnie Marsh
- Steve Roccaforte
- Mike Wells

Legend

- (C) Team captain
- (S) Suspended
- (I) Ineligible
- (W) Walk-on
- Injured
- Current redshirt

Roster
Last update: November 2, 2013

== Schedule and results ==
Date time, TV	Opponent	Result	Record	Site (attendance) city, state
Exhibition
11/04/2013*; 7:00 pm	Barry	W 88–53		USF Sun Dome; Tampa, FL
Regular season
11/09/2013*; 7:00 pm, ESPN3	Tennessee Tech	W 72–62	1–0	USF Sun Dome (4,103); Tampa, FL
11/12/2013*; 7:00 pm, ESPN3	Bethune-Cookman	W 91–65	2–0	USF Sun Dome (3,549); Tampa, FL
11/15/2013*; 8:30 pm, ESPN3	at Bowling Green	W 75–61	3–0	Stroh Center (2,419); Bowling Green, OH
11/22/2013*; 7:00 pm, ESPN3	Stetson	W 72–63	4–0	USF Sun Dome (3,782); Tampa, FL
11/25/2013*; 7:00 pm, ESPNews	No. 5 Oklahoma State	L 67–93	4–1	USF Sun Dome (6,240); Tampa, FL
11/30/2013*; 7:00 pm, ESPN3	Detroit	L 60–65	4–2	USF Sun Dome (3,225); Tampa, FL
12/04/2013*; 7:00 pm	at George Mason	W 68–66	5–2	Patriot Center (4,587); Fairfax, VA
12/07/2013*; 9:00 pm, ESPNU	Alabama	W 66–64	6–2	USF Sun Dome (4,255); Tampa, FL
12/17/2013*; 7:00 pm, ESPNU	Florida Gulf Coast; Las Vegas Classic	W 68–66 ^{2OT}	7–2	USF Sun Dome (4,105); Tampa, FL
12/19/2013*; 7:00 pm, ESPN3	Florida A&M; Las Vegas Classic	W 73–70	8–2	USF Sun Dome (3,433); Tampa, FL
12/22/2013*; 7:00 pm, 1,530	vs. Mississippi State; Las Vegas Classic Semifinals	L 66–71	8–3	Orleans Arena (1,530); Paradise, NV
12/23/2013*; 8:00 pm, CBSSN	vs. Santa Clara; Las Vegas Classic Consolation Game	L 65–66	8–4	Orleans Arena (1,347); Paradise, NV
12/28/2013*; 8:00 pm	at Bradley	W 61–57	9–4	Carver Arena (6,221); Peoria, IL
12/31/2013; 7:00 pm, ESPN2	No. 18 Memphis	L 73–88	9–5 (0–1)	USF Sun Dome (4,063); Tampa, FL
01/04/2014; 4:00 pm, CBSSN	Houston	L 58–67	9–6 (0–2)	USF Sun Dome (3,921); Tampa, FL
01/09/2014; 7:00 pm, ESPNU	at Temple	W 82–75	10–6 (1–2)	Liacouras Center (4,422); Philadelphia, PA
01/15/2014; 7:00 pm, ESPNU	at SMU	L 54–71	10–7 (1–3)	Moody Coliseum (6,332); Dallas, TX
01/18/2014; 5:00 pm, ESPNU	Cincinnati; 19	L 54–61	10–8 (1–4)	USF Sun Dome (5,322); Tampa, FL
01/22/2014; 7:00 pm, ESPNU	No. 12 Louisville	L 47–86	10–9 (1–5)	USF Sun Dome (6,417); Tampa, FL
01/26/2014; 2:00 pm, CBSSN	at No. 23 Memphis	L 58–80	10–10 (1–6)	FedEx Forum (15,627); Memphis, TN
01/28/2014; 7:00 pm, ESPNews	SMU	W 78–71	11–10 (2–6)	USF Sun Dome (3,407); Tampa, FL
02/02/2014; 12:00 pm, CBSSN	at No. 13 Cincinnati	L 45–50	11–11 (2–7)	Fifth Third Arena (10,367); Cincinnati, OH
02/05/2014; 7:00 pm, ESPNews	at Central Florida; War on I-4	W 79–78 ^{OT}	12–11 (3–7)	CFE Arena (6,108); Orlando, FL
02/08/2014; 8:00 pm, ESPNews	Rutgers	L 69–79	12–12 (3–8)	USF Sun Dome (4,605); Tampa, FL
02/12/2014; 7:00 pm, ESPN2	at No. 24 UConn	L 40–83	12–13 (3–9)	XL Center (10,553); Hartford, CT
02/15/2014; 1:30 pm, ESPNews	Central Florida; War on I-4	L 74–75	12–14 (3–10)	USF Sun Dome (5,294); Tampa, FL
02/18/2014; 7:00 pm, CBSSN	at No. 11 Louisville	L 54–80	12–15 (3–11)	KFC Yum! Center (21,655); Louisville, KY
02/26/2014; 7:00 pm, CBSSN	UConn	L 56–61	12–16 (3–12)	USF Sun Dome (5,115); Tampa, FL
03/01/2014; 12:00 pm, ESPNews	at Rutgers	L 73–74	12–17 (3–13)	The RAC (5,611); Piscataway, NJ
03/04/2014; 8:30 pm, ESPNews	at Houston	L 69–78	12–18 (3–14)	Hofheinz Pavilion (3,235); Houston, TX
03/08/2014; 2:00 pm, ESPNews	Temple	L 65–66	12–19 (3–15)	USF Sun Dome (4,073); Tampa, FL
American Athletic Conference tournament
03/12/2014; 7:00 pm, ESPNU	vs. Rutgers; First round	L 68–72	12–20	FedEx Forum (12,102); Memphis, TN
*Non-conference game. ^{#}Rankings from AP Poll. (#) Tournament seedings in parentheses. All times are in Eastern Time.

== Notes ==
- March 31, 2014 – Former Kentucky assistant coach Orlando Antigua was hired to replace Stan Heath
