= 2013–14 Memphis Tigers men's basketball team =

American college basketball season

2013–14 Memphis Tigers men's basketball

Old Spice Classic Champions

NCAA tournament, round of 32
- Conference: American Athletic Conference
- Record: 24–10 (12–6 The American)
- Head coach: Josh Pastner (5th year)
- Assistant coaches: Robert Kirby; Aki Collins; Jason Gardner
- Home arena: FedExForum

2013–14 American Athletic Conference men's basketball standings
	Conf.				Overall
Team	W		L	PCT	W		L	PCT
No. 5 Louisville* †	15	–	3	.833	31	–	6	.838
No. 15 Cincinnati	15	–	3	.833	27	–	7	.794
No. 18 UConn	12	–	6	.667	32	–	8	.800
SMU	12	–	6	.667	27	–	10	.730
Memphis	12	–	6	.667	24	–	10	.706
Houston	8	–	10	.444	17	–	16	.515
Rutgers	5	–	13	.278	12	–	21	.364
UCF	4	–	14	.222	13	–	18	.419
Temple	4	–	14	.222	9	–	22	.290
South Florida	3	–	15	.167	12	–	20	.375
† The American Tournament winner As of March 15th, 2014; *Louisville: 29 reg. season games, 3 postseason games vacated due to sanctions against the program; Disputed Record-(31-6)(15-3); Rankings from AP poll

The 2013–14 Memphis Tigers men's basketball team represented the University of Memphis in the 2013–14 NCAA Division I men's basketball season, the 93rd season of Tiger basketball. The Tigers played their home games at the FedExForum in Memphis. The 2013–14 season was the first season the Tigers participated in the American Athletic Conference. They finished the season 24–10, 12–6 in AAC play to finish in a three-way tie for third place. They lost in the quarterfinals of the AAC tournament to UConn. They received an at-large bid to the NCAA tournament where they defeated George Washington in the second round before losing in the third round to Virginia.

== Previous season ==
The 2012–13 Memphis Tigers finished the season with a record of 31–5 (16–0 C-USA) and ranked 19th in the AP poll. The Tigers won the regular season C-USA title as well as the 2013 Conference USA men's basketball tournament to secure a berth in the 2013 NCAA Division I men's basketball tournament as a 6 seed in the Midwest. The Tigers defeated 11 seed St. Mary's, the first tournament win for Josh Pastner, before falling to 3 seed Michigan State in their second game.

== Off-season ==
=== Departures ===
- #2 Antonio Barton, junior guard, graduate transfer to Tennessee
- #10 Tarik Black, junior forward/center, graduate transfer to Kansas
- #0 Ferrakohn Hall, senior forward
- #23 Charles Holt, senior guard
- #32 Stan Simpson, senior center
- #30 D. J. Stephens, senior forward
- #4 Adonis Thomas, sophomore forward, declared for NBA draft

=== Transfers ===
Name	Pos.	Height	Weight	Year	Hometown	Notes
Michael Dixon	G	6' 1"	190	Senior	Kansas City, MO	Transfer from Missouri
David Pellom	F	6' 8"	220	Senior	Wilmington, NC	Graduate transfer from George Washington

=== Recruiting ===
The Tigers' 2013 recruiting class was ranked as the third best class in the country by ESPN and Rivals.

College recruiting information
Name	Hometown	School	Height	Weight	Commit date
Sam Craft; PG (on football scholarship)	Memphis, TN	Olive Branch	5 ft 11 in (1.80 m)	185 lb (84 kg)	Jun 5, 2012
Sam Craft; PG (on football scholarship)	Recruit ratings: Scout: Rivals: ESPN:				
Markel Crawford; SG	Memphis, TN	Melrose	6 ft 4 in (1.93 m)	180 lb (82 kg)	Aug 8, 2012
Markel Crawford; SG	Recruit ratings: Scout: Rivals: ESPN:				
Kuran Iverson; SF	Windsor, CT	Fishburne Military School	6 ft 8 in (2.03 m)	200 lb (91 kg)	Sep 25, 2012
Kuran Iverson; SF	Recruit ratings: Scout: Rivals: ESPN:				
Nick King; SF	Memphis, TN	East	6 ft 7 in (2.01 m)	210 lb (95 kg)	Aug 27, 2012
Nick King; SF	Recruit ratings: Scout: Rivals: ESPN:				
Austin Nichols; PF	Eads, Tennessee	Briarcrest	6 ft 8 in (2.03 m)	200 lb (91 kg)	Nov 5, 2012
Austin Nichols; PF	Recruit ratings: Scout: Rivals: ESPN:				
Rashawn "Pookie" Powell; PG	Orlando, FL	Dr. Phillips High School	6 ft 0 in (1.83 m)	170 lb (77 kg)	Sep 15, 2012
Rashawn "Pookie" Powell; PG	Recruit ratings: Scout: Rivals: ESPN:				
Dominic Woodson; C	Round Rock, TX	Huntington Prep	6 ft 10 in (2.08 m)	290 lb (130 kg)	May 29, 2013
Dominic Woodson; C	Recruit ratings: Scout: Rivals: ESPN:				
Overall recruit ranking: Scout: #2 Rivals: #3 ESPN: #2
Note: In many cases, Scout, Rivals, 247Sports, On3, and ESPN may conflict in their listings of height and weight.; In these cases, the average was taken. ESPN grades are on a 100-point scale.; Sources: "Memphis Basketball Commitments". Rivals.; "2013 Memphis Basketball Commits". Scout.; "ESPN". ESPN.; "Scout.com Team Recruiting Rankings". Scout.; "2013 Team Ranking". Rivals.

== Season summary ==
The Tigers entered the 2013–14 season ranked 13th in both the AP and Coaches polls. On October 30, Memphis announced that freshman Kuran Iverson would be suspended by the NCAA for the team's first regular-season game against Austin Peay due to his participation in an unauthorized summer league game near his home in Connecticut. On November 7, senior forward David Pellom underwent knee surgery which was expected to prevent him from playing for five weeks. However, Pellom was able to return to limited game action by November 28.

In their first game against a ranked opponent, the Tigers were defeated by then #7 Oklahoma State in dominating fashion. Marcus Smart scored 39 points en route to a 21-point victory over the Tigers.

The Tigers participated in the Old Spice Classic, an early season tournament in Orlando. The field for the Old Spice also included LSU, Purdue, Butler, Washington State, St. Joseph's, Siena, and Oklahoma State. The Tigers defeated Siena in the first round and LSU in the semifinal. They again faced Oklahoma State, then the fifth ranked team in the country, in the final on December 1. The Tigers defeated the Cowboys by 5, marking Josh Pasner's first win over an AP top 25 team. Shaq Goodwin was named MVP of the tournament, and Austin Nichols was named to the all-tournament team.

The Tigers' next big out of conference game occurred on December 17 in the Jimmy V Classic against #16 Florida. The Tigers and Gators played a back and forth game with the Gators coming out on top by 2. Both teams were praised by sportswriters for the level of play in the game.

The inaugural AAC conference season began on New Year's Eve, where the Tigers faced South Florida on the road. The Tigers picked up their first victory in their new conference with a strong performance, overwhelming the Bulls. In the Tigers' second AAC game, they faced the 12–2 Cincinnati Bearcats at the Forum in a renewal of an old rivalry between the new conference mates. The first half was closely contested, with the Tigers leading all but the final seconds of the half. However, Cincinnati pulled away in the second half while Memphis shot poorly from the outside, ending the game 2 for 17 from three-point range.

The Tigers next went on the road to 12th ranked Louisville. The Tigers defeated the defending NCAA champions 73–67. After the game, Coach Pastner and the team were heckled by Louisville fans who called the Tigers "thugs" and "classless." Pastner responded by yelling to the fans that his team has a perfect Academic Progress Rate score.

The Tigers final out of conference regular-season game took place on February 8 at the Forum against #23 Gonzaga. The Tigers went down by as many as 12 points in the second half. However, after a comeback sparked by a block by 6 foot Joe Jackson against 7 foot 1 inch Gonzaga center Przemek Karnowski, the Tigers defeated Gonzaga by 6.

The Tigers suffered their only loss to a team with a losing record at the hands of the Houston Cougars on February 27. However, two days later, the Tigers took out #7 Louisville at home to sweep the season series with the Cardinals.

The #19 Tigers entered the AAC tournament with a 12–6 record in conference and in a three-way tie for third with SMU and UConn. Due to tiebreak rules, however, the Tigers ended up as the 5th seed in the AAC tournament and took on 4 seed UConn. The 21st ranked Huskies dominated the Tigers in the AAC quarterfinals at the FedExForum, winning all three games against the Tigers on the year. The Tigers fell out of both polls for the first time of the 13–14 season thereafter.

The Tigers earned an at large bid to the 2014 NCAA tournament, where they were placed in the East region as an 8 seed. The Tigers defeated 9 seed George Washington on March 21 in Raleigh, North Carolina. They fell to 1 seed Virginia in next round, 60 to 78.

The Tigers finished the year with a 5–6 record against top 25 teams. The 11 games against ranked opponents and 5 top 25 wins both were the most recorded by the Tigers in a season since Josh Pastner became coach in 2009. However, the 7 of the Tigers' 10 losses on the season were by double digits, also the most in a single season under Pastner.

== Roster ==
2013–14 Memphis Tigers men's basketball team
Players
Coaches

Pos.	#	Name	Height	Weight	Year	Hometown
G	0	Damien Wilson	6 ft 6 in (1.98 m)	191 lb (87 kg)	So	Atlanta, Georgia
G	1	Joe Jackson (C)	6 ft 1 in (1.85 m)	174 lb (79 kg)	Sr	Memphis, Tennessee
F	2	Shaq Goodwin	6 ft 9 in (2.06 m)	242 lb (110 kg)	So	Atlanta, Georgia
G	3	Chris Crawford (C)	6 ft 4 in (1.93 m)	222 lb (101 kg)	Sr	Memphis, Tennessee
F	4	Austin Nichols	6 ft 8 in (2.03 m)	212 lb (96 kg)	Fr	Eads, Tennessee
G/F	5	Nick King	6 ft 7 in (2.01 m)	220 lb (100 kg)	Fr	Memphis, Tennessee
G	10	Markel Crawford (redshirt)	6 ft 4 in (1.93 m)	187 lb (85 kg)	Fr	Memphis, Tennessee
G	11	Michael Dixon	6 ft 1 in (1.85 m)	200 lb (91 kg)	Sr	Kansas City, Missouri
F	12	David Pellom	6 ft 7 in (2.01 m)	224 lb (102 kg)	Sr	Wilmington, North Carolina
C	15	Dominic Woodson	6 ft 10 in (2.08 m)	310 lb (141 kg)	Fr	Round Rock, Texas
G	20	RaShawn Powell (redshirt)	6 ft 1 in (1.85 m)	170 lb (77 kg)	Fr	Orlando, Florida
G/F	23	Kuran Iverson	6 ft 10 in (2.08 m)	209 lb (95 kg)	Fr	Windsor, Connecticut
G	32	Trey Draper (W)	5 ft 10 in (1.78 m)	170 lb (77 kg)	Sr	Memphis, Tennessee
G	35	Anthony Cole (W)	6 ft 1 in (1.85 m)	193 lb (88 kg)	So	Arlington, Tennessee
G/F	42	Jake McDowell (W)	6 ft 6 in (1.98 m)	196 lb (89 kg)	Fr	Memphis, Tennessee
G	55	Geron Johnson	6 ft 3 in (1.91 m)	197 lb (89 kg)	Sr	Dayton, Ohio

Head coach

- Josh Pastner (Arizona)

Assistant coach(es)

- Robert Kirby (Texas–Pan American)
- David "Aki" Collins (Clark Atlanta)
- Jason Gardner (Arizona)

Legend

- (C) Team captain
- (S) Suspended
- (I) Ineligible
- (W) Walk-on
- Injured
- Current redshirt

Roster
Last update: 11/27/13

== Schedule ==
Date time, TV	Rank^{#}	Opponent^{#}	Result	Record	Site (attendance) city, state
Exhibition
11/08/2013*; 7:00 p.m.	No. 13	Christian Brothers	W 92–63	–	FedEx Forum (N/A); Memphis, TN
Regular season
11/14/2013*; 7:00 p.m., SPSO	No. 13	Austin Peay	W 95–69	1–0	FedEx Forum (15,785); Memphis, TN
11/19/2013*; 7:00 p.m., ESPN	No. 11	at No. 7 Oklahoma State; Old Spice Classic campus game	L 80–101	1–1	Gallagher-Iba Arena (13,611); Stillwater, OK
11/23/2013*; 5:00 p.m., SPSO	No. 11	Nicholls State	W 98–59	2–1	FedEx Forum (15,528); Memphis, TN
11/28/2013*; 5:30 p.m., ESPN2	No. 21	vs. Siena; Old Spice Classic quarterfinal	W 87–60	3–1	HP Field House (N/A); Orlando, FL
11/29/2013*; 4:30 p.m., ESPN2	No. 21	vs. LSU; Old Spice Classic Semi-final	W 76–69	4–1	HP Field House (2,612); Orlando, FL
12/01/2013*; 6:30 p.m., ESPN2	No. 21	vs. No. 5 Oklahoma State; Old Spice Classic Championship	W 73–68	5–1	HP Field House (3,633); Orlando, FL
12/07/2013*; 12:00 p.m., ESPN3	No. 16	Northwestern State	W 96–76	6–1	FedEx Forum (15,605); Memphis, TN
12/13/2013*; 7:00 p.m., ESPN3	No. 16	Arkansas–Little Rock	W 73–59	7–1	FedEx Forum (15,821); Memphis, TN
12/17/2013*; 8:00 p.m., ESPN	No. 14	vs. No. 16 Florida; Jimmy V Classic	L 75–77	7–2	Madison Square Garden (8,062); New York, NY
12/21/2013*; 7:00 p.m., SPSO	No. 14	Southeast Missouri State	W 77–65	8–2	FedEx Forum (15,021); Memphis, TN
12/28/2013*; 11:00 a.m., ESPNU	No. 17	Jackson State	W 75–61	9–2	FedEx Forum (15,797); Memphis, TN
12/31/2013; 6:00 p.m., ESPN2	No. 18	at South Florida	W 88–73	10–2 (1–0)	USF Sun Dome (4,063); Tampa, FL
01/04/2014; 11:00 a.m., ESPN2	No. 18	Cincinnati	L 53–69	10–3 (1–1)	FedEx Forum (17,191); Memphis, TN
01/09/2014; 6:00 p.m., ESPN	No. 24	at No. 12 Louisville	W 73–67	11–3 (2–1)	KFC Yum! Center (21,988); Louisville, KY
01/11/2014; 2:00 p.m., ESPN2	No. 24	at Temple	W 79–69	12–3 (3–1)	Liacouras Center (5,718); Philadelphia, PA
01/16/2014; 6:00 p.m., ESPN	No. 17	UConn	L 73–83	12–4 (3–2)	FedEx Forum (18,039); Memphis, TN
01/18/2014*; 1:00 p.m., SPSO	No. 17	LeMoyne–Owen	W 101–78	13–4	FedEx Forum (14,021); Memphis, TN
01/23/2014; 7:00 p.m., ESPNews	No. 23	Houston	W 82–59	14–4 (4–2)	FedEx Forum (15,702); Memphis, TN
01/26/2014; 1:00 p.m., CBSSN	No. 23	South Florida	W 80–58	15–4 (5–2)	FedEx Forum (15,627); Memphis, TN
01/29/2014; 6:00 p.m., ESPN2	No. 22	at UCF	W 69–59	16–4 (6–2)	CFE Arena (5,161); Orlando, FL
02/01/2014; 1:00 p.m., CBSSN	No. 22	at SMU	L 72–87	16–5 (6–3)	Moody Coliseum (7,058); Dallas, TX
02/04/2014; 6:00 p.m., CBSSN	No. 24	Rutgers	W 101–69	17–5 (7–3)	FedEx Forum (14,967); Memphis, TN
02/08/2014*; 8:00 p.m., ESPN	No. 24	No. 23 Gonzaga; ESPN College Gameday	W 60–54	18–5	FedEx Forum (18,248); Memphis, TN
02/12/2014; 8:00 p.m., ESPNU	No. 20	UCF	W 76–70	19–5 (8–3)	FedEx Forum (15,021); Memphis, TN
02/15/2014; 11:00 a.m., ESPN	No. 20	at No. 24 UConn	L 81–86 ^{OT}	19–6 (8–4)	XL Center (16,294); Hartford, CT
02/20/2014; 6:00 p.m., CBSSN	No. 22	at Rutgers	W 64–59	20–6 (9–4)	Rutgers Athletic Center (5,558); Piscataway, NJ
02/22/2014; 8:30 p.m., ESPNU	No. 22	Temple	W 82–79 ^{OT}	21–6 (10–4)	FedEx Forum (18,172); Memphis, TN
02/27/2014; 8:00 p.m., CBSSN	No. 21	at Houston	L 68–77	21–7 (10–5)	Hofheinz Pavilion (3,628); Houston, TX
03/01/2014; 1:00 p.m., CBS	No. 21	No. 7 Louisville	W 72–66	22–7 (11–5)	FedEx Forum (18,365); Memphis, TN
03/06/2014; 6:00 p.m., ESPN	No. 20	at No. 15 Cincinnati	L 84–97	22–8 (11–6)	Fifth Third Arena (13,176); Cincinnati, OH
03/08/2014; 11:00 a.m., ESPN2	No. 20	No. 18 SMU	W 67–58	23–8 (12–6)	FedEx Forum (18,182); Memphis, TN
American Athletic Conference tournament
03/13/2014; 8:30 p.m., ESPNU	(5) No. 19	(4) No. 21 UConn; Quarterfinals	L 53–72	23–9	FedEx Forum (13,081); Memphis, TN
NCAA Tournament
03/21/2014*; 5:55 p.m., TBS	(8 E)	vs. (9 E) George Washington; Second round	W 71–66	24–9	PNC Arena (17,472); Raleigh, NC
03/23/2014*; 7:40 p.m., TNT	(8 E)	vs. (1 E) No. 3 Virginia; Third round	L 60–78	24–10	PNC Arena (18,712); Raleigh, NC
*Non-conference game. ^{#}Rankings from AP Poll, (#) denotes seed within region E=East. (#) Tournament seedings in parentheses. All times are in Central Time.

== Rankings ==
Ranking movement Legend: ██ Increase in ranking. ██ Decrease in ranking. (rv) Received votes but unranked.
Poll	Pre	Wk 2	Wk 3	Wk 4	Wk 5	Wk 6	Wk 7	Wk 8	Wk 9	Wk 10	Wk 11	Wk 12	Wk 13	Wk 14	Wk 15	Wk 16	Wk 17	Wk 18	Wk 19	Wk 20	Final
AP	13	13	11	21	16	16	15	17	18	24	17	23	22	24	20	22	21	20	19	RV	n/a
Coaches	13	13	11	19	15	15	14	17	18	22	17	22	22	RV	22	24	22	20	19	RV	RV
