= 2013–14 Rutgers Scarlet Knights men's basketball team =

American college basketball season

2013–14 Rutgers Scarlet Knights men's basketball
- Conference: American Athletic Conference
- Record: 12–21 (5–13 AAC)
- Head coach: Eddie Jordan (1st season)
- Assistant coaches: David Cox; Van Macon; Kyle Triggs
- Home arena: Louis Brown Athletic Center

2013–14 American Athletic Conference men's basketball standings
	Conf.				Overall
Team	W		L	PCT	W		L	PCT
No. 5 Louisville* †	15	–	3	.833	31	–	6	.838
No. 15 Cincinnati	15	–	3	.833	27	–	7	.794
No. 18 UConn	12	–	6	.667	32	–	8	.800
SMU	12	–	6	.667	27	–	10	.730
Memphis	12	–	6	.667	24	–	10	.706
Houston	8	–	10	.444	17	–	16	.515
Rutgers	5	–	13	.278	12	–	21	.364
UCF	4	–	14	.222	13	–	18	.419
Temple	4	–	14	.222	9	–	22	.290
South Florida	3	–	15	.167	12	–	20	.375
† The American Tournament winner As of March 15th, 2014; *Louisville: 29 reg. season games, 3 postseason games vacated due to sanctions against the program; Disputed Record-(31-6)(15-3); Rankings from AP poll

The 2013–14 Rutgers Scarlet Knights men's basketball team represented Rutgers University during the 2013–14 NCAA Division I men's basketball season. The Scarlet Knights, led by first-year head coach Eddie Jordan, played their home games at the Louis Brown Athletic Center, better known as The RAC, as members of the American Athletic Conference (AAC), formerly known as the Big East Conference. They finished the season 12–21, 5–13 in AAC play, to finish in seventh place. They advanced to the quarterfinals of the AAC tournament, where they lost to Louisville.

This was their lone year in the American, as they moved to the Big Ten Conference in July 2014.

== Roster ==
Number	Name	Position	Height	Weight	Year	Hometown
0	Malick Kone	Guard/forward	6'5"	200	Junior	Conakry, Guinea
1	Jerome Seagears	Guard	6'1"	175	Junior	Silver Spring, MD
3	Kerwin Okoro	Guard/forward	6'5"	220	Sophomore	The Bronx, NY
4	Myles Mack	Guard	5'9"	175	Junior	Paterson, NJ
10	Junior Etou	Forward	6'7"	225	Freshman	Republic of the Congo
11	Kadeem Jack	Forward	6'9"	230	Junior	Queens, NY
15	Craig Brown	Guard/forward	6'5"	220	Junior	Miami, FL
21	Stephen Zurich	Forward	6'5"	205	Sophomore	Montvale, NJ
23	Jalen Hyde	Guard	5'8"	160	Sophomore	Somerset, NJ
30	Khalil Batie	Guard	5'10"	165	Freshman	Willingboro, NJ
33	Wally Judge	Forward	6'9"	250	Senior	Washington, D.C.
35	Greg Lewis	Forward	6'9"	260	Sophomore	Baltimore, MD
44	J.J. Moore	Forward	6'6"	215	Senior	Brentwood, NY
55	D'Von Campbell	Guard	5'11"	178	Junior	Arlington, TX

== Schedule ==
Date time, TV	Opponent	Result	Record	Site (attendance) city, state
Exhibition
11/01/2013*; 7:30 p.m.	Caldwell	W 90–60		The RAC; Piscataway, NJ
Regular season
11/08/2013*; 7:30 p.m., ESPN3	Florida A&M	W 92–84	1–0	The RAC (5,083); Piscataway, NJ
11/11/2013*; 8:00 p.m., SNY/CSS	at UAB	L 76–79	1–1	Bartow Arena (4,073); Birmingham, AL
11/14/2013*; 7:30 p.m., ESPN3	Yale	W 72–71	2–1	The RAC (4,487); Piscataway, NJ
11/18/2013*; 7:30 p.m., ESPN3	Canisius; NIT Season Tip-Off first round	W 66–51	3–1	The RAC (2,106); Piscataway, NJ
11/19/2013*; 7:30 p.m., ESPN3	Drexel; NIT Season Tip-Off quarterfinals	L 59–70	3–2	The RAC (3,025); Piscataway, NJ
11/23/2013*; 2:00 p.m., ESPN3	William & Mary	L 62–72	3–3	The RAC (4,027); Piscataway, NJ
11/25/2013*; 7:30 p.m.	Stillman College; NIT Season Tip-Off consolation round	W 116–89	4–3	The RAC (392); Piscataway, NJ
11/26/2013*; 7:30 p.m.	Fairleigh Dickinson; NIT Season Tip-Off consolation round	L 72–73	4–4	The RAC (466); Piscataway, NJ
12/04/2013*; 7:00 p.m., SNY/CSNMA	at George Washington	L 87–93	4–5	Smith Center (3,089); Washington, D.C.
12/08/2013*; 8:00 p.m., ESPNU	Seton Hall; Rivalry	L 71–77	4–6	The RAC (5,210); Piscataway, NJ
12/11/2013*; 7:30 p.m., ESPN3	Princeton; Rivalry	L 73–78	4–7	The RAC (4,255); Piscataway, NJ
12/14/2013*; 4:00 p.m., ESPN3	UNC Greensboro	W 89–72	5–7	The RAC (4,122); Piscataway, NJ
12/22/2013*; 2:00 p.m., ESPN3	Army	W 75–72	6–7	The RAC (4,648); Piscataway, NJ
01/01/2014; 8:00 p.m., ESPNU	Temple	W 71–66	7–7 (1–0)	The RAC (3,842); Piscataway, NJ
01/04/2014; 6:00 p.m., CBSSN	No. 14 Louisville	L 76–83	7–8 (1–1)	The RAC (7,263); Piscataway, NJ
01/11/2014; 6:00 p.m., CBSSN	at Cincinnati	L 51–71	7–9 (1–2)	Fifth Third Arena (10,872); Cincinnati, OH
01/15/2014; 7:00 p.m., ESPNews	UCF	W 85–75	8–9 (2–2)	The RAC (4,031); Piscataway, NJ
01/19/2014; 2:00 p.m., CBSSN	at Houston	L 55–77	8–10 (2–3)	Hofheinz Pavilion (3,115); Houston, TX
01/21/2014; 8:00 p.m., ESPNews	at SMU	L 56–70	8–11 (2–4)	Moody Coliseum (6,042); Dallas, TX
01/25/2014; 7:00 p.m., ESPNU	UConn	L 71–82	8–12 (2–5)	The RAC (8,006); Piscataway, NJ
01/29/2014; 7:00 p.m., ESPNews	at Temple	L 82–88	8–13 (2–6)	Liacouras Center (5,039); Philadelphia, PA
02/01/2014; 4:30 p.m., ESPNews	Houston	W 93–70	9–13 (3–6)	The RAC (5,616); Piscataway, NJ
02/04/2014; 7:00 p.m., CBSSN	at No. 24 Memphis	L 69–101	9–14 (3–7)	FedEx Forum (14,967); Memphis, TN
02/08/2014; 8:00 p.m., ESPNew	at South Florida	W 79–69	10–14 (4–7)	USF Sun Dome (4,605); Tampa, FL
02/13/2014; 7:00 p.m., ESPNews	No. 23 SMU	L 65–77	10–15 (4–8)	The RAC (4,094); Piscataway, NJ
02/16/2014; 6:00 p.m., ESPN2	at No. 13 Louisville	L 54–102	10–16 (4–9)	KFC Yum! Center (21,821); Louisville, KY
02/20/2014; 7:00 p.m., CBSSN	No. 22 Memphis	L 59–64	10–17 (4–10)	The RAC (5,558); Piscataway, NJ
02/26/2014; 7:00 p.m., ESPNU	at UCF	L 65–67	10–18 (4–11)	CFE Arena (4,661); Orlando, FL
03/01/2014; 12:00 p.m., ESPNews	South Florida	W 74–73	11–18 (5–11)	The RAC (5,611); Piscataway, NJ
03/05/2014; 7:00 p.m., ESPNU	at No. 19 UConn	L 63–69	11–19 (5–12)	Gampel Pavilion (10,167); Storrs, CT
03/08/2014; 12:00 p.m., ESPNews	No. 15 Cincinnati	L 66–70	11–20 (5–13)	The RAC (6,650); Piscataway, NJ
American Athletic Conference tournament
03/12/2014; 7:00 p.m., ESPNU	vs. South Florida; First round	W 72–68	12–20	FedEx Forum (12,102); Memphis, TN
03/13/2014; 3:00 p.m., ESPNU	vs. No. 5 Louisville; Quarterfinals	L 31–92	12–21	FedEx Forum (13,011); Memphis, TN
*Non-conference game. ^{#}Rankings from AP poll. (#) Tournament seedings in parentheses. All times are in Eastern.
