= 2013–14 Temple Owls men's basketball team =

American college basketball season

2013–14 Temple Owls men's basketball
- Conference: American Athletic Conference
- Record: 9–22 (4–14 The American)
- Head coach: Fran Dunphy (8th season)
- Assistant coaches: Dave Duke; Dwayne Killings; Shawn Trice
- Home arena: Liacouras Center

2013–14 American Athletic Conference men's basketball standings
	Conf.				Overall
Team	W		L	PCT	W		L	PCT
No. 5 Louisville* †	15	–	3	.833	31	–	6	.838
No. 15 Cincinnati	15	–	3	.833	27	–	7	.794
No. 18 UConn	12	–	6	.667	32	–	8	.800
SMU	12	–	6	.667	27	–	10	.730
Memphis	12	–	6	.667	24	–	10	.706
Houston	8	–	10	.444	17	–	16	.515
Rutgers	5	–	13	.278	12	–	21	.364
UCF	4	–	14	.222	13	–	18	.419
Temple	4	–	14	.222	9	–	22	.290
South Florida	3	–	15	.167	12	–	20	.375
† The American Tournament winner As of March 15th, 2014; *Louisville: 29 reg. season games, 3 postseason games vacated due to sanctions against the program; Disputed Record-(31-6)(15-3); Rankings from AP poll

The 2013–14 Temple Owls basketball team represented Temple University during the 2013–14 NCAA Division I men's basketball season. The Owls, led by eighth year head coach Fran Dunphy, played home games at the Liacouras Center. This was their inaugural season in the American Athletic Conference. They finished the season 9–22, 4–14 in AAC play to finish in a tie for eighth place.

They lost in the first round of the AAC tournament to UCF.

== Roster ==
2013–14 Temple Owls men's basketball team
Players
Coaches

Pos.	#	Name	Height	Weight	Year	Previous school	Hometown
G	1	Josh Brown	6 ft 3 in (1.91 m)	185 lb (84 kg)	Fr	St. Anthony (NJ)	Irvington, NJ
G	2	Will Cummings	6 ft 2 in (1.88 m)	175 lb (79 kg)	Jr	Providence School	Jacksonville, FL
F	3	Anthony Lee	6 ft 9 in (2.06 m)	230 lb (104 kg)	Jr	West Oaks Academy (FL)	Columbia, MD
F	10	Mark Williams	6 ft 8 in (2.03 m)	240 lb (109 kg)	Fr	Montrose Christian School	Cleveland, OH
F	13	Nick Pendergrast	6 ft 5 in (1.96 m)	180 lb (82 kg)	Jr	Kent School	Bridgewater, CT
F	15	Jimmy McDonnell	6 ft 10 in (2.08 m)	210 lb (95 kg)	Jr	Jackson Memorial High School	Jackson, NJ
G	25	Quenton DeCosey	6 ft 5 in (1.96 m)	180 lb (82 kg)	So	St. Joseph, Metuchen, NJ	Union, NJ
G	32	Dalton Pepper	6 ft 5 in (1.96 m)	220 lb (100 kg)	Sr	Pennsbury High School	Levittown, PA
F/C	41	Devontae Watson	6 ft 10 in (2.08 m)	210 lb (95 kg)	So	Lincoln Park Performing Arts	Ambridge, PA
G/F	42	Daniel Dingle (injured)	6 ft 7 in (2.01 m)	225 lb (102 kg)	So	St. Raymond	Bronx, NY

Head coach

- Fran Dunphy

Assistant coach(es)

- Dave Duke
- Dwayne Killings
- Shawn Trice

Legend

- (C) Team captain
- (S) Suspended
- (I) Ineligible
- (W) Walk-on
- Injured
- Current redshirt

Roster
Last update: August 25, 2013

== Schedule and results ==
Date time, TV	Opponent	Result	Record	Site (attendance) city, state
Regular season
November 9, 2013*; 5:00 pm	at Penn	W 78–73	1–0	Palestra (8,722); Philadelphia, PA
November 11, 2013*; 7:00 pm, ESPNU	Kent State	L 77–81	1–1	Liacouras Center (6,589); Philadelphia, PA
November 14, 2013*; 7:30 pm, NBCSN	at Towson	L 69–75	1–2	Tiger Arena (3,554); Towson, MD
November 21, 2013*; 8:00 pm, ESPN3	vs. Clemson; Charleston Classic 1st Round	L 58–72	1–3	TD Arena (2,311); Charleston, SC
November 22, 2013*; 7:00 pm, ESPN3	vs. Georgia; Charleston Classic	W 83–81	2–3	TD Arena; Charleston, SC
November 24, 2013*; 6:30 pm, ESPN3	vs. UAB; Charleston Classic	W 87–66	3–3	TD Arena; Charleston, SC
December 4, 2013*; 8:00 pm, ESPNews	Saint Joseph's	W 77–69	4–3	Liacouras Center (8,039); Philadelphia, PA
December 7, 2013*; 12:00 pm, ESPN2	vs. Texas	L 80–81 ^{OT}	4–4	Wells Fargo Center (6,092); Philadelphia, PA
December 18, 2013*; 7:00 pm, ESPN3	Texas Southern	L 89–90	4–5	Liacouras Center (4,682); Philadelphia, PA
December 21, 2013*; 5:30 pm	vs. Long Island	W 101–65	5–5	Barclays Center (11,039); Brooklyn, NY
January 1, 2014; 8:00 pm, ESPNU	at Rutgers	L 66–71	5–6 (0–1)	Rutgers Athletic Center (3,842); Piscataway, NJ
January 4, 2014; 4:00 pm, ESPNews	at UCF	L 76–78	5–7 (0–2)	CFE Arena (4,815); Orlando, FL
January 9, 2014; 7:00 pm, ESPNU	South Florida	L 75–82	5–8 (0–3)	Liacouras Center (4,422); Philadelphia, PA
January 11, 2014; 3:00 pm, ESPN2	No. 24 Memphis	L 69–79	5–9 (0–4)	Liacouras Center (5,718); Philadelphia, PA
January 14, 2014; 9:00 pm, CBSSN	at No. 19 Cincinnati	L 58–69	5–10 (0–5)	Fifth Third Arena (9,864); Cincinnati, OH
January 18, 2014*; 12:00 pm, ESPN2	La Salle; ESPN College GameDay	L 68–74	5–11	Palestra (8,722); Philadelphia, PA
January 21, 2014; 7:00 pm, CBSSN	at UConn	L 66–90	5–12 (0–6)	XL Center (4,741); Hartford, CT
January 26, 2014; 4:00 pm, CBSSN	No. 15 Cincinnati	L 76–80	5–13 (0–7)	Liacouras Center (6,753); Philadelphia, PA
January 29, 2014; 7:00 pm, ESPNews	Rutgers	W 88–82	6–13 (1–7)	Liacouras Center (5,039); Philadelphia, PA
February 1, 2014*; 4:00 pm, CBSSN	No. 9 Villanova	L 74–90	6–14	Liacouras Center (10,206); Philadelphia, PA
February 6, 2014; 8:00 pm, ESPNews	at SMU	L 52–75	6–15 (1–8)	Moody Coliseum (6,852); University Park, TX
February 9, 2014; 2:00 pm, ESPNews	at Houston	L 74–88	6–16 (1–9)	Hofheinz Pavilion (3,535); Houston, TX
February 14, 2014; 6:00 pm, ESPN2	No. 13 Louisville	L 58–82	6–17 (1–10)	Liacouras Center (5,286); Philadelphia, PA
February 16, 2014; 2:00 pm, CBSSN	No. 23 SMU	W 71–64	7–17 (2–10)	Liacouras Center (6,566); Philadelphia, PA
February 20, 2014; 9:00 pm, ESPN2	No. 21 UConn	L 55–68	7–18 (2–11)	Liacouras Center (6,053); Philadelphia, PA
February 22, 2014; 9:30 pm, ESPNU	at No. 22 Memphis	L 79–82 ^{OT}	7–19 (2–12)	FedEx Forum (18,172); Memphis, TN
February 27, 2014; 9:00 pm, ESPN	at No. 7 Louisville	L 66–88	7–20 (2–13)	KFC Yum! Center (21,312); Louisville, KY
March 1, 2014; 9:00 pm, ESPNU	Houston	L 79–89	7–21 (2–14)	Liacouras Center (3,978); Philadelphia, PA
March 4, 2014; 6:30 pm, ESPNews	UCF	W 86–78	8–21 (3–14)	Liacouras Center (4,063); Philadelphia, PA
March 8, 2014; 2:00 pm, ESPNews	at South Florida	L 65–66	9–21 (4–14)	USF Sun Dome (4,073); Tampa, FL
American Athletic Conference tournament
March 12, 2014; 9:30 pm, ESPNU	vs. UCF; First round	L 90–94 ^{2OT}	9–22	FedEx Forum (12,102); Memphis, TN
*Non-conference game. ^{#}Rankings from AP Poll. (#) Tournament seedings in parentheses. All times are in Eastern Time.
