= 2013–14 American Athletic Conference men's basketball season =

- League: NCAA Division I
- Sport: Basketball
- Duration: November 2013 through March 2014
- Teams: 10
- TV partner(s): ESPN, CBS

Regular Season
- Co-Champions: Cincinnati, Louisville (Note: On February 20, 2018, the NCAA announced that Louisville will be forced to vacate wins and records from the 2011-12, 2012-13, 2013-14, and 2014-15 seasons.)
- Season MVP: Shabazz Napier, UConn
- Top scorer: Sean Kilpatrick, Cincinnati

Tournament
- Champions: Louisville
- Runners-up: Connecticut
- Finals MVP: Russ Smith, Louisville

American Conference men's basketball seasons
- ← 2012–13 2014–15 →

2013–14 American Athletic Conference men's basketball standings
	Conf.				Overall
Team	W		L	PCT	W		L	PCT
No. 5 Louisville* †	15	–	3	.833	31	–	6	.838
No. 15 Cincinnati	15	–	3	.833	27	–	7	.794
No. 18 UConn	12	–	6	.667	32	–	8	.800
SMU	12	–	6	.667	27	–	10	.730
Memphis	12	–	6	.667	24	–	10	.706
Houston	8	–	10	.444	17	–	16	.515
Rutgers	5	–	13	.278	12	–	21	.364
UCF	4	–	14	.222	13	–	18	.419
Temple	4	–	14	.222	9	–	22	.290
South Florida	3	–	15	.167	12	–	20	.375
† The American Tournament winner As of March 15th, 2014; *Louisville: 29 reg. season games, 3 postseason games vacated due to sanctions against the program; Disputed Record-(31-6)(15-3); Rankings from AP poll

The 2013–14 American Athletic Conference men's basketball season took place between November 2013 and concluded in March 2014. Practices began in October 2013, with conference play beginning in December, and the season ended with the 2014 American Athletic Conference men's basketball tournament. The season was the first since the split of the original Big East Conference into two separate leagues.

This was the first season that Houston, Memphis, SMU, Temple, and UCF participated in American Athletic competition. It was also the final season for Louisville and Rutgers in Big East/AAC competition, as these schools left for the Atlantic Coast Conference and Big Ten Conference respectively.

== Preseason ==
=== Coaching changes ===
- Mike Rice was fired by Rutgers following a player abuse scandal.

=== Predicted American Athletic results ===
At American Athletic Conference media day on October 16, the conference released their predictions for standings and All-Conference teams.

	American Athletic Coaches	American Athletic Writers
1.	Louisville (9)	
2.	Connecticut (1)	
3.	Memphis	
4.	Cincinnati	
5.	Temple	
6.	SMU	
7.	Houston	
8.	South Florida	
9.	UCF	
10.	Rutgers	

first place votes

=== 2013-14 Preseason All-American Athletic Teams ===
First Team	Second Team
Sean Kilpatrick, G, CIN; Shabazz Napier, G, CONN; Chane Behanan, F, LOU; Russ Smith, G, LOU; Joe Jackson, G, MEM	Isaiah Sykes, G, UCF; Ryan Boatright, G, CONN; TaShawn Thomas, F, HOU; Montrezl Harrell, F, LOU; Anthony Collins, G, USF; Victor Rudd, F, USF

American Athletic Preseason Player of the Year: Russ Smith, Louisville
American Athletic Preseason Rookie of the Year: Keith Frazier, SMU

=== Preseason Watchlists ===
Naismith	John Wooden Award
Montrezl Harrell, LOU; Joe Jackson, MEM; Sean Kilpatrick, CIN; Shabazz Napier, CONN; Russ Smith, LOU	Montrezl Harrell, LOU; Joe Jackson, MEM; Sean Kilpatrick, CIN; Shabazz Napier, CONN; Russ Smith, LOU

== Rankings ==
Legend
	Improvement in ranking
	Drop in ranking
	Not ranked previous week
RV	Received votes but were not ranked in Top 25 of poll

		Pre	Wk 2	Wk 3	Wk 4	Wk 5	Wk 6	Wk 7	Wk 8	Wk 9	Wk 10	Wk 11	Wk 12	Wk 13	Wk 14	Wk 15	Wk 16	Wk 17	Wk 18	Wk 19	Final
Cincinnati	AP	RV	RV	RV	RV	RV	RV				RV	19	15	13	7	10	7	11			
Cincinnati	C										RV	23	16	15	7	11	9	12			
Connecticut	AP	18	19	18	13	12	9	10	15	17	RV	RV	RV	RV	22	24	21	RV			
Connecticut	C	19	20	18	14	14	12	10	15	15	RV	RV	RV	RV	RV	RV	21	RV	19		
Houston	AP																				
Houston	C																				
Louisville	AP	3	3	3	9	7	6	6	6	14	12	18	12	12	14	13	11	7			
Louisville	C	3	3	2	9	6	4	4	4	10	8	14	9	7	10	8	5	4			
Memphis	AP	13	13	11	21	16	16	15	17	18	24	17	23	22	24	20	22	21			
Memphis	C	13	13	11	19	15	15	14	17	18	22	17	22	22	RV	22	24	22			
Rutgers	AP																				
Rutgers	C																				
SMU	AP								RV		RV		RV	RV	RV	23	RV	23			
SMU	C													RV	RV	RV	RV	24	18		
South Florida	AP																				
South Florida	C																				
Temple	AP																				
Temple	C	RV																			
UCF	AP																				
UCF	C																				

== Conference Schedules ==
=== Composite matrix ===
This table summarizes the head-to-head results between teams in conference play. (x) indicates games scheduled this season.

	Cincinnati	Connecticut	Houston	Louisville	Memphis	Rutgers	SMU	South Florida	Temple	UCF
vs. Cincinnati	–	1–1	0–2	1–1	0–2	0–2	1–1	0–2	0–2	0–2
vs. Connecticut	1–1	–	1–1	1–0	0–2	0–1	2–0	0–1	0–2	0–2
vs. Houston	2–0	1–1	–	2–0	1–0	1–1	2–0	0–1	0–1	0–1
vs. Louisville	1–1	0–1	0–2	–	1–0	0–2	0–1	0–2	0–1	0–2
vs. Memphis	2–0	2–0	0–1	0–1	–	0–2	1–0	0–2	0–2	0–2
vs. Rutgers	2–0	1–0	1–1	2–0	2–0	–	2–0	0–2	1–1	0–1
vs. SMU	1–1	0–2	0–2	1–0	0–1	0–2	–	1–1	1–1	0–1
vs. South Florida	2–0	1–0	1–0	2–0	2–0	1–0	1–1	–	0–1	1–1
vs. Temple	2–0	2–0	1–0	1–0	2–0	1–1	1–1	1–0	–	1–0
vs. UCF	2–0	2–0	1–0	2–0	2–0	1–0	1–0	1–1	0–1	–
Total	15–3	9–5	5–9	12–2	10–4	4–10	11–4	3–11	2–12	2–12

=== Cincinnati ===
Date time, TV	Rank^{#}	Opponent^{#}	Result	Record	Site city, state
AAC Regular Season
January 1, 2014; 6:00 pm, ESPNU		SMU	W 65–57	12–2 (1–0)	Fifth Third Arena; Cincinnati
January 4, 2014; 12:00 pm, ESPN2		at No. 18 Memphis	W 69–53	13–2 (2–0)	FedEx Forum; Memphis, Tennessee
January 7, 2014; 9:00 pm, CBSSN		at Houston	W 61–60	14–2 (3–0)	Hofheinz Pavilion; Houston, Texas
January 11, 2014; 6:00 pm, CBSSN		Rutgers	W 71–51	15–2 (4–0)	Fifth Third Arena; Cincinnati
January 14, 2014; 9:00 pm, CBSSN	No. 19	Temple	W 69–58	16–2 (5–0)	Fifth Third Arena; Cincinnati
January 18, 2014; 5:00 pm, ESPNU	No. 19	at South Florida	W 61–54	17–2 (6–0)	USF Sun Dome; Tampa, Florida
January 23, 2014; 9:00 pm, CBSSN	No. 15	UCF	W 69–51	18–2 (7–0)	Fifth Third Arena; Cincinnati
January 26, 2014; 4:00 pm, CBSSN	No. 15	at Temple	W 80–76	19–2 (8–0)	Liacouras Center; Philadelphia
January 30, 2014; 7:00 pm, ESPN	No. 13	at No. 12 Louisville	W 69–66	20–2 (9–0)	KFC Yum! Center; Louisville, Kentucky
February 2, 2014; 12:00 pm, CBSSN	No. 13	South Florida	W 50–45	21–2 (10–0)	Fifth Third Arena; Cincinnati
February 6, 2014; 7:00 pm, ESPN	No. 7	No. 22 Connecticut	W 63–58	22–2 (11–0)	Fifth Third Arena; Cincinnati
February 8, 2014; 7:30 pm, ESPNU	No. 7	at SMU	L 55–76	22–3 (11–1)	Moody Coliseum; Dallas
February 15, 2014; 3:00 pm, ESPNU	No. 10	Houston	W 73–62	23–3 (12–1)	Fifth Third Arena; Cincinnati
February 19, 2014; 7:00 pm, ESPNU	No. 7	at UCF	W 77–49	24–3 (13–1)	CFE Arena; Orlando, Florida
February 22, 2014; 12:00 pm, CBS	No. 7	No. 11 Louisville	L 57–58	24–4 (13–2)	Fifth Third Arena; Cincinnati
March 1, 2014; 12:00 pm, ESPN	No. 11	at Connecticut	L 45–51	24–5 (13–3)	XL Center; Hartford, Connecticut
March 6, 2014; 7:00 pm, ESPN	No. 15	No. 20 Memphis	W 97–84	25–5 (14–3)	Fifth Third Arena; Cincinnati
March 8, 2014; 12:00 pm, ESPNews	No. 15	at Rutgers	W 70–66	26–5 (15–3)	The RAC; Pisacataway, New Jersey
2014 American Athletic Conference tournament
March 13, 2014; 7:00 pm, ESPNU	No. 13	vs. UCF	W 61–58	27–5	FedEx Forum; Memphis, Tennessee
March 14, 2014; 9:30 pm, ESPN2	No. 13	vs. No. 21 Connecticut	L 56–58	27–6	FedEx Forum; Memphis, Tennessee
NCAA tournament
March 20, 2014; 2:10 pm, TNT	No. 15	vs. Harvard	L 57–61	27–7	Spokane Veterans Memorial Arena; Spokane, WA
*Non-conference game. ^{#}Rankings from AP Poll. (#) Tournament seedings in parentheses. All times are in Eastern Time.

=== Connecticut ===
Date time, TV	Rank^{#}	Opponent^{#}	Result	Record	Site (attendance) city, state
Exhibition
10/30/2013*; 7:00 pm		Southern Connecticut State	W 93–65	–	Gampel Pavilion; Storrs, CT
11/04/2013*; 7:00 pm		Concordia	W 98–38	–	XL Center (5,504); Hartford, CT
Regular season
11/08/2013*; 6:30 pm, ESPN2	No. 18	vs. Maryland	W 78–77	1–0	Barclays Center (12,867); Brooklyn, NY
11/11/2013*; 3:00 pm, SNY	No. 19	Yale	W 80–62	2–0	XL Center (8,848); Hartford, CT
11/14/2013*; 7:00 pm, SNY	No. 19	Detroit; 2K Sports Classic	W 101–55	3–0	Gampel Pavilion (8,140); Storrs, CT
11/17/2013*; 12:00 pm, ESPNU	No. 19	Boston University; 2K Sports Classic	W 77–60	4–0	Gampel Pavilion (9,195); Storrs, CT
11/21/2013*; 7:00 pm, ESPN2	No. 18	vs. Boston College; 2K Sports Classic Semifinals	W 72–70	5–0	Madison Square Garden (10,064); New York City, NY
11/22/2013*; 7:30 pm, ESPN2	No. 18	vs. Indiana; 2K Sports Classic Championship	W 59–58	6–0	Madison Square Garden (10,051); New York City, NY
11/26/2013*; 7:00 pm, SNY	No. 13	Loyola (MD)	W 76–66	7–0	XL Center (9,497); Hartford, CT
12/02/2013*; 7:00 pm, ESPN2	No. 12	No. 15 Florida	W 65–64	8–0	Gampel Pavilion (10,167); Storrs, CT
12/06/2013*; 7:00 pm, ESPN3/SNY	No. 12	Maine	W 95–68	9–0	XL Center (9,681); Hartford, CT
12/18/2013*; 9:00 pm, ESPN2	No. 10	Stanford	L 51–53	9–1	XL Center (11,140); Hartford, CT
12/22/2013*; 3:30 pm, ESPNU	No. 10	at Washington	W 82–70	10–1	Alaska Airlines Arena (7,059); Seattle, WA
12/28/2013*; 1:00 pm, SNY	No. 15	Eastern Washington	W 82–65	11–1	Webster Bank Arena (9,274); Bridgeport, CT
12/31/2013; 9:00 pm, ESPN2	No. 17	at Houston	L 71–75	11–2 (0–1)	Hofheinz Pavilion (4,035); Houston, TX
01/04/2014; 2:00 pm, ESPNU		at SMU	L 65–74	11–3 (0–2)	Moody Coliseum (7,166); Dallas, TX
01/08/2014*; 7:00 pm, ESPNU		Harvard	W 61–56	12–3	Gampel Pavilion (9,218); Storrs, CT
01/11/2014; 6:00 pm, ESPNU		Central Florida	W 84–61	13–3 (1–2)	Gampel Pavilion (9,561); Storrs, CT
01/16/2014; 7:00 pm, ESPN		at No. 17 Memphis	W 83–73	14–3 (2–2)	FedEx Forum (18,039); Memphis, TN
01/18/2014; 9:00 pm, ESPN		No. 18 Louisville; ESPN College GameDay	L 64–76	14–4 (2–3)	Gampel Pavilion (10,167); Storrs, CT
01/21/2014; 7:00 pm, CBSSN		Temple	W 90–66	15–4 (3–3)	XL Center (4,741); Hartford, CT
01/25/2014; 7:00 pm, ESPNU		at Rutgers	W 82–71	16–4 (4–3)	The RAC (8,006); Piscataway, NJ
01/30/2014; 9:00 pm, CBSSN		Houston	W 80–43	17–4 (5–3)	Gampel Pavilion (9,312); Storrs, CT
02/06/2014; 7:00 pm, ESPN	No. 22	at No. 7 Cincinnati	L 58–63	17–5 (5–4)	Fifth Third Arena (12,432); Cincinnati, OH
02/09/2014; 6:00 pm, ESPN2	No. 22	at Central Florida	W 75–55	18–5 (6–4)	CFE Arena (6,312); Orlando, FL
02/12/2014; 7:00 pm, ESPN2	No. 24	South Florida	W 83–40	19–5 (7–4)	XL Center (10,553); Hartford, CT
02/15/2014; 12:00 pm, ESPN	No. 24	No. 20 Memphis	W 86–81 ^{OT}	20–5 (8–4)	XL Center (16,294); Hartford, CT
02/20/2014; 9:00 pm, ESPN	No. 21	at Temple	W 68–55	21–5 (9–4)	Liacouras Center (6,053); Philadelphia, PA
02/23/2014; 2:00 pm, CBSSN	No. 21	SMU	L 55–64	21–6 (9–5)	Gampel Pavilion (10,167); Storrs, CT
02/26/2014; 7:00 pm, CBSSN		at South Florida	W 61–56	22–6 (10–5)	USF Sun Dome (5,115); Tampa, FL
03/01/2014; 12:00 pm, ESPN		No. 11 Cincinnati	W 51–45	23–6 (11–5)	XL Center (16,294); Hartford, CT
03/05/2014; 7:00 pm, ESPNU	No. 19	Rutgers	W 69–63	24–6 (12–5)	Gampel Pavilion (10,167); Storrs, CT
03/08/2014; 2:00 pm, CBS	No. 19	at No. 11 Louisville	L 48–81	24–7 (12–6)	KFC Yum! Center (22,782); Louisville, KY
AAC tournament
03/13/2014; 9:00 pm, ESPNU	No. 21	vs. No. 19 Memphis; Quarterfinals	W 72–53	25–7	FedEx Forum (13,081); Memphis, TN
03/14/2014; 9:00 pm, ESPN2	No. 21	vs. No. 13 Cincinnati; Semifinals	W 58–56	26–7	FedEx Forum (11,888); Memphis, TN
03/15/2014; 6:00 pm, ESPN	No. 21	vs. No. 5 Louisville; Championship	L 61–71	26–8	FedEx Forum (13,554); Memphis, TN
NCAA tournament
03/20/2014*; 6:55 pm, TBS	(7 E) No. 18	vs. (10 E) Saint Joseph's; Second Round	W 89–81 ^{OT}	27–8	First Niagara Center (18,706); Buffalo, NY
03/22/2014*; 9:40 pm, TBS	(7 E) No. 18	vs. (2 E) No. 6 Villanova; Third Round	W 77–65	28–8	First Niagara Center (19,290); Buffalo, NY
03/28/2014*; 7:27 pm, TBS	(7 E) No. 18	vs. (3 E) No. 9 Iowa State; Sweet Sixteen	W 81–76	29–8	Madison Square Garden (19,314); New York, NY
03/30/2014*; 2:20 pm, CBS	(7 E) No. 18	vs. (4 E) No. 11 Michigan State; Elite Eight	W 60–54	30–8	Madison Square Garden (19,499); New York, NY
04/05/2014*; 6:09 pm, TBS	(7 E) No. 18	vs. (1 S) No. 1 Florida; Final Four	W 63–53	31–8	AT&T Stadium (79,444); Arlington, TX
04/07/2014*; 9:10 pm, CBS	(7 E) No. 18	vs. (8 MW) Kentucky; National Championship Game	W 60–54	32–8	AT&T Stadium (79,238); Arlington, TX
*Non-conference game. ^{#}Rankings from AP Poll. (#) Tournament seedings in parentheses. E=East Region, S=South Region, MW=Midwest Region. All times are in Eastern Time.

=== Houston ===
Date time, TV	Opponent	Result	Record	Site (attendance) city, state
Exhibition
Nov 5*; 7:00 pm	St. Thomas	W 81–63		Hofheinz Pavilion (2,435); Houston
Non-conference regular season
Nov 8*; 8:00 pm, ESPN3	Texas State	W 76–70	1–0	Hofheinz Pavilion (3,123); Houston
Nov 11*; 7:00 pm	at Texas–Pan American	W 77–65	2–0	UTPA Fieldhouse (1,432); Edinburg, Texas
Nov 14*; 7:00 pm, ESPN3	UTSA	W 80–62	3–0	Hofheinz Pavilion (2,800); Houston
Nov 17*; 1:00 pm, ESPN3	Lehigh; Legends Classic – Houston Regional Game 1	W 80–66	4–0	Hofheinz Pavilion (2,635); Houston
Nov 21*; 7:00 pm, ESPN3	Howard; Legends Classic – Houston Regional Game 2	W 75–62	5–0	Hofheinz Pavilion (2,815); Houston
Nov 25*; 8:30 pm, ESPN2	vs. Stanford; Legends Classic – Semifinals	L 76–86	5–1	Barclays Center (4,142); Brooklyn, New York
Nov 26*; 6:00 pm, ESPN3	vs. Texas Tech; Legends Classic – Consolation Game	L 64–76	5–2	Barclays Center (3,514); Brooklyn, New York
Nov 30*; 7:00 pm, ESPN3	Texas A&M–Corpus Christi	W 78–67	6–2	Hofheinz Pavilion (3,015); Houston
Dec 4*; 7:00 pm, ESPN3/FSN	at Texas A&M	L 57–74	6–3	Reed Arena (4,850); College Station, Texas
Dec 7*; 5:00 pm, ESPN3	San Jose State	L 68–72	6–4	Hofheinz Pavilion (3,105); Houston
Dec 9*; 6:30 pm, ESPN3	Alcorn State	W 89–58	7–4	Hofheinz Pavilion (2,833); Houston
Dec 14*; 7:05 pm	at Louisiana–Lafayette	L 76–79 ^{OT}	7–5	Cajundome (3,069); Lafayette, Louisiana
Dec 21*; 3:30 pm, CSS/CSNH	vs. Rice; Lone Star Showcase	W 54–52	8–5	Toyota Center (5,907); Houston
American Athletic Conference regular season
Dec 31; 8:00 pm, ESPN2	No. 17 UConn	W 75–71	9–5 (1–0)	Hofheinz Pavilion (4,035); Houston
Jan 4; 3:00 pm, CBSSN	at South Florida	W 67–58	10–5 (2–0)	USF Sun Dome (3,921); Tampa, Florida
Jan 7; 8:00 pm, CBSSN	Cincinnati	L 60–61	10–6 (2–1)	Hofheinz Pavilion (3,804); Houston
Jan 16; 6:00 pm, CBSSN	at No. 18 Louisville	L 52–91	10–7 (2–2)	KFC Yum! Center (21,132); Louisville, Kentucky
Jan 19; 12:00 pm, CBSSN	Rutgers	W 77–55	11–7 (3–2)	Hofheinz Pavilion (3,115); Houston
Jan 23; 7:00 pm, ESPNews	at No. 23 Memphis	L 59–82	11–8 (3–3)	FedEx Forum (15,702); Memphis, Tennessee
Jan 26; 2:00 pm, ESPNews	SMU	L 68–75	11–9 (3–4)	Hofheinz Pavilion (4,567); Houston
Jan 30; 8:00 pm, CBSSN	at Connecticut	L 43–80	11–10 (3–5)	Gampel Pavilion (9,312); Storrs, Connecticut
Feb 1; 3:30 pm, ESPNews	at Rutgers	L 70–93	11–11 (3–6)	The RAC (5,616); Piscataway, New Jersey
Feb 5; 8:00 pm, ESPNU	No. 14 Louisville	L 62–77	11–12 (3–7)	Hofheinz Pavilion (7,247); Houston
Feb 9; 1:00 pm, ESPNews	Temple	W 88–74	12–12 (4–7)	Hofheinz Pavilion (3,535); Houston
Feb 15; 2:00 pm, ESPNU	at No. 10 Cincinnati	L 62–73	12–13 (4–8)	Fifth Third Arena (13,176); Cincinnati
Feb 19; 7:00 pm, ESPNews	at SMU	L 64–68	12–14 (4–9)	Moody Coliseum (6,991); Dallas
Feb 22; 1:00 pm, ESPNews	UCF	W 88–84	13–14 (5–9)	Hofheinz Pavilion (7,028); Houston
Feb 27; 8:00 pm, CBSSN	No. 21 Memphis	W 77–68	14–14 (6–9)	Hofheinz Pavilion (3,628); Houston
Mar 1; 8:00 pm, ESPNU	at Temple	W 89–79	15–14 (7–9)	Liacouras Center (3,978); Philadelphia
Mar 4; 7:30 pm, ESPNews	South Florida	W 79–68	16–14 (8–9)	Hofheinz Pavilion (3,235); Houston
Mar 7; 6:00 pm, CBSSN	at UCF	L 83–104	16–15 (8–10)	CFE Arena (5,471); Orlando, Florida
American Athletic Conference tournament
Mar 13; 12:00 pm, ESPNU	vs. No. 25 SMU; Quarterfinals	W 68–64	17–15	FedEx Forum (13,011); Memphis, Tennessee
Mar 14; 6:00 pm, ESPN2	vs. No. 5 Louisville; Semifinals	L 65–94	17–16	FedEx Forum (11,888); Memphis, Tennessee
*Non-conference game. ^{#}Rankings from AP Poll. (#) Tournament seedings in parentheses. All times are in Central Time.

=== Louisville ===
- Louisville: 29 reg. season games, 3 postseason games vacated due to sanctions against the program.

Date time, TV	Rank^{#}	Opponent^{#}	Result	Record	Site (attendance) city, state
Exhibition
Oct 29*; 7:00 pm, WHAS	No. 3	Kentucky Wesleyan	W 115–67	–	KFC Yum! Center (20,288); Louisville, KY
Nov 6*; 7:00 pm, WHAS	No. 3	Pikeville	W 90–61	–	KFC Yum! Center (19,227); Louisville, KY
Regular season
Nov 9*; 1:00 pm, WHAS	No. 3	Charleston	W 70–48	1–0	KFC Yum! Center (20,938); Louisville, KY
Nov 12*; 7:00 pm, WHAS	No. 3	Hofstra; Hall of Fame Classic	W 97–69	2–0	KFC Yum! Center (20,112); Louisville, KY
Nov 15*; 7:00 pm, WHAS	No. 3	Cornell	W 99–54	3–0	KFC Yum! Center (19,834); Louisville, KY
Nov 19*; 7:00 pm, WHAS	No. 3	Hartford; Hall of Fame Classic	W 87–48	4–0	KFC Yum! Center (20,226); Louisville, KY
Nov 23*; 2:00 pm, ESPN3	No. 3	vs. Fairfield; Hall of Fame Classic	W 71–57	5–0	Mohegan Sun Arena (8,113); Uncasville, CT
Nov 24*; 1:00 pm, ESPN	No. 3	vs. No. 24 North Carolina; Hall of Fame Classic	L 84–93	5–1	Mohegan Sun Arena (N/A); Uncasville, CT
Nov 29*; 7:00 pm, WHAS	No. 9	Southern Miss	W 69–38	6–1	KFC Yum! Center (21,416); Louisville, KY
Dec 4*; 7:00 pm, WHAS	No. 7	UMKC	W 90–62	7–1	KFC Yum! Center (20,269); Louisville, KY
Dec 7*; 1:00 pm, WHAS	No. 7	Louisiana–Lafayette	W 113–74	8–1	KFC Yum! Center (20,141); Louisville, KY
Dec 14*; 12 noon, ESPN2	No. 6	WKU; Billy Minardi Classic	W 79–63	9–1	KFC Yum! Center (22,027); Louisville, KY
Dec 17*; 9:00 pm, ESPN2	No. 6	Missouri State	W 90–60	10–1	KFC Yum! Center (21,335); Louisville, KY
Dec 21*; 5:00 pm, FS1	No. 6	at Florida International	W 85–56	11–1	U.S. Century Bank Arena (3,361); Miami, FL
Dec 28*; 4:00 pm, CBS	No. 6	at No. 18 Kentucky; Battle for the Bluegrass	L 66–73	11–2	Rupp Arena (24,396); Lexington, KY
Dec 31; 5:00 pm, ESPN2	No. 14	at UCF	W 90–65	12–2 (1–0)	CFE Arena (7,094); Orlando, FL
Jan 4; 6:00 pm, CBSSN	No. 14	at Rutgers	W 83–76	13–2 (2–0)	Rutgers Athletic Center (7,263); Piscataway, NJ
Jan 9; 7:00 pm, ESPN	No. 12	No. 24 Memphis	W 73–67	13–3 (2–1)	KFC Yum! Center (21,988); Louisville, KY
Jan 12; 2:00 pm, CBSSN	No. 12	SMU	W 71–63	14–3 (3–1)	KFC Yum! Center (21,237); Louisville, KY
Jan 16; 7:00 pm, CBSSN	No. 18	Houston	W 91–52	15–3 (4–1)	KFC Yum! Center (21,132); Louisville, KY
Jan 18; 9:00 pm, ESPN	No. 18	at UConn; ESPN College GameDay	W 76–64	16–3 (5–1)	Gampel Pavilion (10,167); Storrs, CT
Jan 22; 7:00 pm, ESPNU	No. 12	at South Florida	W 86–74	17–3 (6–1)	USF Sun Dome (6,417); Tampa, FL
Jan 30; 7:00 pm, ESPN	No. 12	No. 13 Cincinnati	L 66–69	17–4 (6–2)	KFC Yum! Center (22,644); Louisville, KY
Feb 1; 9:00 pm, ESPNU	No. 12	UCF	W 87–70	18–4 (7–2)	KFC Yum! Center (22,201); Louisville, KY
Feb 5; 9:00 pm, ESPNU	No. 14	at Houston	W 77–62	19–4 (8–2)	Hofheinz Pavilion (7,247); Houston, TX
Feb 13; 7:00 pm, ESPN	No. 13	at Temple	W 82–58	20–4 (9–2)	Liacouras Center (6,566); Philadelphia, PA
Feb 16; 6:00 pm, ESPN2	No. 13	Rutgers	W 102–54	21–4 (10–2)	KFC Yum! Center (21,821); Louisville, KY
Feb 18; 7:00 pm, CBSSN	No. 11	South Florida	W 80–54	22–4 (11–2)	KFC Yum! Center (21,655); Louisville, KY
Feb 22; 12 noon, CBS	No. 11	at No. 7 Cincinnati	W 58–57	23–4 (12–2)	Fifth Third Arena (13,176); Cincinnati, OH
Feb 27; 9:00 pm, ESPN	No. 7	Temple	W 88–66	24–4 (12–2)	KFC Yum! Center (21,312); Louisville, KY
Mar 1; 2:00 pm, CBS	No. 7	at No. 21 Memphis	L 66–72	24–5 (12–3)	FedEx Forum (18,375); Memphis, TN
Mar 5; 7:00 pm, CBSSN	No. 11	at No. 18 SMU	W 84–71	25–5 (13–3)	Moody Coliseum (7,305); Dallas, TX
Mar 8; 2:00 pm, CBS	No. 11	No. 19 UConn; Senior Day	W 81–48	26–5 (15–3)	KFC Yum! Center (22,782); Louisville, KY
American Athletic Conference tournament
Mar 13; 3:00 pm, ESPNU	No. 5	vs. Rutgers; Quarterfinals	W 92–31	27–5	FedEx Forum (13,011); Memphis, TN
Mar 14; 7:00 pm, ESPN2	No. 5	vs. Houston; Semifinals	W 94–65	28–5	FedEx Forum (11,888); Memphis, TN
Mar 15; 6:00 pm, ESPN2	No. 5	vs. No. 21 UConn; Championship	W 71–61	29–5	FedEx Forum (13,554); Memphis, TN
NCAA tournament
Mar 20*; 9:45 pm, TNT	No. 5 (4 MW)	vs. (13 MW) Manhattan; Second round	W 71–64	30–5	Amway Center (14,866); Orlando, FL
Mar 22*; 2:45 pm, CBS	No. 5 (4 MW)	vs. No. 25 (5 MW) Saint Louis; Third round	W 66–51	31–5	Amway Center (18,512); Orlando, FL
Mar 28*; 9:45 pm, CBS	No. 5 (4 MW)	vs. (8 MW) Kentucky; Sweet Sixteen	L 69–74	31–6	Lucas Oil Stadium (41,072); Indianapolis, IN
*Non-conference game. ^{#}Rankings from AP Poll. (#) Tournament seedings in parentheses. All times are in Eastern Time. (#) during NCAA Tournament is seed within region MW=Midwest.

=== Memphis ===
Date time, TV	Rank^{#}	Opponent^{#}	Result	Record	Site (attendance) city, state
Exhibition
11/08/2013*; 7:00 p.m.	No. 13	Christian Brothers	W 92–63	–	FedEx Forum (N/A); Memphis, TN
Regular season
11/14/2013*; 7:00 p.m., SPSO	No. 13	Austin Peay	W 95–69	1–0	FedEx Forum (15,785); Memphis, TN
11/19/2013*; 7:00 p.m., ESPN	No. 11	at No. 7 Oklahoma State	L 80–101	1–1	Gallagher-Iba Arena (13,611); Stillwater, OK
11/23/2013*; 5:00 p.m., SPSO	No. 11	Nicholls State	W 98–59	2–1	FedEx Forum (15,528); Memphis, TN
11/28/2013*; 5:30 p.m., ESPN2	No. 21	vs. Siena; Old Spice Classic	W 87–60	3–1	HP Field House (N/A); Orlando, FL
11/29/2013*; 4:30 p.m., ESPN2	No. 21	vs. LSU; Old Spice Classic Semi-final	W 76–69	4–1	HP Field House (2,612); Orlando, FL
12/01/2013*; 6:30 p.m., ESPN2	No. 21	vs. No. 5 Oklahoma State; Old Spice Classic Championship	W 73–68	5–1	HP Field House (3,633); Orlando, FL
12/07/2013*; 12:00 p.m., ESPN3	No. 16	Northwestern State	W 96–76	6–1	FedEx Forum (15,605); Memphis, TN
12/13/2013*; 7:00 p.m., ESPN3	No. 16	Arkansas–Little Rock	W 73–59	7–1	FedEx Forum (15,821); Memphis, TN
12/17/2013*; 8:00 p.m., ESPN	No. 14	vs. No. 16 Florida; Jimmy V Classic	W 77–75	7–2	Madison Square Garden (8,062); New York, NY
12/21/2013*; 7:00 p.m., SPSO	No. 14	Southeast Missouri State	W 77–65	8–2	FedEx Forum (15,021); Memphis, TN
12/28/2013*; 11:00 a.m., ESPNU	No. 17	Jackson State	W 75–61	9–2	FedEx Forum (15,797); Memphis, TN
12/31/2013; 6:00 p.m., ESPN2	No. 18	at South Florida	W 88–73	10–2 (1–0)	USF Sun Dome (4,063); Tampa, FL
01/04/2014; 11:00 a.m., ESPN2	No. 18	Cincinnati	L 53–69	10–3 (1–1)	FedEx Forum (17,191); Memphis, TN
01/09/2014; 6:00 p.m., ESPN	No. 24	at No. 12 Louisville	W 73–67	11–3 (2–1)	KFC Yum! Center (21,988); Louisville, KY
01/11/2014; 2:00 p.m., ESPN2	No. 24	at Temple	W 79–69	12–3 (3–1)	Liacouras Center (5,718); Philadelphia, PA
01/16/2014; 6:00 p.m., ESPN	No. 17	UConn	L 73–83	12–4 (3–2)	FedEx Forum (18,039); Memphis, TN
01/18/2014*; 1:00 p.m., SPSO	No. 17	LeMoyne–Owen	W 101–78	13–4	FedEx Forum (14,021); Memphis, TN
01/23/2014; 7:00 p.m., ESPNews	No. 23	Houston	W 82–59	14–4 (4–2)	FedEx Forum (15,702); Memphis, TN
01/26/2014; 1:00 p.m., CBSSN	No. 23	South Florida	W 80–58	15–4 (5–2)	FedEx Forum (15,627); Memphis, TN
01/29/2014; 6:00 p.m., ESPN2	No. 22	at UCF	W 69–59	16–4 (6–2)	CFE Arena (5,161); Orlando, FL
02/01/2014; 1:00 p.m., CBSSN	No. 22	at SMU	W 87–72	16–5 (6–3)	Moody Coliseum (7,058); Dallas, TX
02/04/2014; 6:00 p.m., CBSSN	No. 24	Rutgers	W 101–69	17–5 (7–3)	FedEx Forum (14,967); Memphis, TN
02/08/2014*; 8:00 p.m., ESPN	No. 24	No. 23 Gonzaga; ESPN College Gameday	W 60–54	18–5	FedEx Forum (18,248); Memphis, TN
02/12/2014; 8:00 p.m., ESPNU	No. 20	UCF	W 76–70	19–5 (8–3)	FedEx Forum (15,021); Memphis, TN
02/15/2014; 11:00 a.m., ESPN	No. 20	at No. 24 UConn	L 81–86 ^{OT}	19–6 (8–4)	XL Center (16,294); Hartford, CT
02/20/2014; 6:00 p.m., CBSSN	No. 22	at Rutgers	W 64–59	20–6 (9–4)	Rutgers Athletic Center (5,558); Piscataway, NJ
02/22/2014; 8:30 p.m., ESPNU	No. 22	Temple	W 82–79 ^{OT}	21–6 (10–4)	FedEx Forum (18,172); Memphis, TN
02/27/2014; 8:00 p.m., CBSSN	No. 21	at Houston	L 68–77	21–7 (10–5)	Hofheinz Pavilion (3,628); Houston, TX
03/01/2014; 1:00 p.m., CBS	No. 21	No. 7 Louisville	W 72–66	22–7 (11–5)	FedEx Forum (18,365); Memphis, TN
03/06/2014; 6:00 p.m., ESPN	No. 20	at No. 15 Cincinnati	L 84–97	22–8 (11–6)	Fifth Third Arena (13,176); Cincinnati, OH
03/08/2014; 11:00 a.m., ESPN2	No. 20	No. 18 SMU	W 67–58	23–8 (12–6)	FedEx Forum (18,182); Memphis, TN
American Athletic Conference tournament
03/13/2014; 8:30 p.m., ESPNU	No. 19	vs. No. 21 UConn; Quarterfinals	L 53–72	23–9	FedEx Forum (13,081); Memphis, TN
NCAA tournament
03/21/2014*; 5:55 p.m., TBS	No. (8 E)	vs. (9 E) George Washington; Second round	W 71–66	24–9	PNC Arena (17,472); Raleigh, NC
03/23/2014*; 7:40 p.m., TNT	No. (8 E)	vs. No. 3 (1 E) Virginia; Third round	L 60–78	24–10	PNC Arena (18,712); Raleigh, NC
*Non-conference game. ^{#}Rankings from AP Poll, (#) denotes seed within region E=East. (#) Tournament seedings in parentheses. All times are in Central Time.

=== Rutgers ===
Date time, TV	Opponent	Result	Record	Site (attendance) city, state
Exhibition
11/01/2013*; 7:30 pm	Caldwell	W 90–60		The RAC; Piscataway, NJ
Regular season
11/08/2013*; 7:30 pm, ESPN3	Florida A&M	W 92–84	1–0	The RAC (5,083); Piscataway, NJ
11/11/2013*; 8:00 pm, SNY/CSS	at UAB	L 76–79	1–1	Bartow Arena (4,073); Birmingham, AL
11/14/2013*; 7:30 pm, ESPN3	Yale	W 72–71	2–1	The RAC (4,487); Piscataway, NJ
11/18/2013*; 7:30 pm, ESPN3	Canisius; NIT Season Tip-Off First Round	W 66–51	3–1	The RAC (2,106); Piscataway, NJ
11/19/2013*; 7:30 pm, ESPN3	Drexel; NIT Season Tip-Off Quarterfinals	L 59–70	3–2	The RAC (3,025); Piscataway, NJ
11/23/2013*; 2:00 pm, ESPN3	William & Mary	L 62–72	3–3	The RAC (4,027); Piscataway, NJ
11/25/2013*; 7:30 pm	Stillman College; NIT Season Tip-Off consolation round	W 116–89	4–3	The RAC (392); Piscataway, NJ
11/26/2013*; 7:30 pm	Fairleigh Dickinson; NIT Season Tip-Off consolation round	L 72–73	4–4	The RAC (466); Piscataway, NJ
12/04/2013*; 7:00 pm, SNY/CSNMA	at George Washington	L 87–93	4–5	Smith Center (3,089); Washington, D.C.
12/08/2013*; 8:00 pm, ESPNU	Seton Hall	L 71–77	4–6	The RAC (5,210); Piscataway, NJ
12/11/2013*; 7:30 pm, ESPN3	Princeton; Rivalry	L 73–78	4–7	The RAC (4,255); Piscataway, NJ
12/14/2013*; 4:00 pm, ESPN3	UNC Greensboro	W 89–72	5–7	The RAC (4,122); Piscataway, NJ
12/22/2013*; 2:00 pm, ESPN3	Army	W 75–72	6–7	The RAC (4,648); Piscataway, NJ
01/01/2014; 8:00 pm, ESPNU	Temple	W 71–66	7–7 (1–0)	The RAC (3,842); Piscataway, NJ
01/04/2014; 6:00 pm, CBSSN	No. 14 Louisville	L 76–83	7–8 (1–1)	The RAC (7,263); Piscataway, NJ
01/11/2014; 6:00 pm, CBSSN	at Cincinnati	L 51–71	7–9 (1–2)	Fifth Third Arena (10,872); Cincinnati, OH
01/15/2014; 7:00 pm, ESPNNEWS	UCF	W 85–75	8–9 (2–2)	The RAC (4,031); Piscataway, NJ
01/19/2014; 2:00 pm, CBSSN	at Houston	L 55–77	8–10 (2–3)	Hofheinz Pavilion (3,115); Houston, TX
01/21/2014; 8:00 pm, ESPNews	at SMU	L 56–70	8–11 (2–4)	Moody Coliseum (6,042); Dallas, TX
01/25/2014; 7:00 pm, ESPNU	UConn	L 71–82	8–12 (2–5)	The RAC (8,006); Piscataway, NJ
01/29/2014; 7:00 pm, ESPNNEWS	at Temple	L 82–88	8–13 (2–6)	Liacouras Center (5,039); Philadelphia, PA
02/01/2014; 4:30 pm, ESPNNEWS	Houston	W 93–70	9–13 (3–6)	The RAC (5,616); Piscataway, NJ
02/04/2014; 7:00 pm, CBSSN	at No. 24 Memphis	L 69–101	9–14 (3–7)	FedEx Forum (14,967); Memphis, TN
02/08/2014; 8:00 pm, ESPNEWS	at South Florida	W 79–69	10–14 (4–7)	USF Sun Dome (4,605); Tampa, FL
02/13/2014; 7:00 pm, ESPNEWS	No. 23 SMU	L 65–77	10–15 (4–8)	The RAC (4,094); Piscataway, NJ
02/16/2014; 6:00 pm, ESPN2	at No. 13 Louisville	L 54–102	10–16 (4–9)	KFC Yum! Center (21,821); Louisville, KY
02/20/2014; 7:00 pm, CBSSN	No. 22 Memphis	L 59–64	10–17 (4–10)	The RAC (5,558); Piscataway, NJ
02/26/2014; 7:00 pm, ESPNU	at UCF	L 65–67	10–18 (4–11)	CFE Arena (4,661); Orlando, FL
03/01/2014; 12:00 pm, ESPNEWS	South Florida	W 74–73	11–18 (5–11)	The RAC (5,611); Piscataway, NJ
03/05/2014; 7:00 pm, ESPNU	at No. 19 UConn	L 63–69	11–19 (5–12)	Gampel Pavilion (10,167); Storrs, CT
03/08/2014; 12:00 pm, ESPNNEWS	No. 15 Cincinnati	L 66–70	11–20 (5–13)	The RAC (6,650); Piscataway, NJ
American Athletic Conference tournament
03/12/2014; 7:00 pm, ESPNU	vs. South Florida; First round	W 72–68	12–20	FedEx Forum (12,102); Memphis, TN
03/13/2014; 3:00 pm, ESPNU	vs. No. 5 Louisville; Quarterfinals	L 31–92	12–21	FedEx Forum (13,011); Memphis, TN
*Non-conference game. ^{#}Rankings from AP Poll. (#) Tournament seedings in parentheses. All times are in Eastern Time.

=== SMU ===
Date time, TV	Rank^{#}	Opponent^{#}	Result	Record	Site (attendance) city, state
Non-conference regular season
11/08/2013*; 6:30 pm, FSSW+		vs. TCU; Tip-Off Showcase	W 69–61	1–0	American Airlines Center (5,207); Dallas
11/11/2013*; 7:00 pm, ESPN3		Rhode Island	W 89–58	2–0	Curtis Culwell Center (3,239); Garland, Texas
11/18/2013*; 7:00 pm		at Arkansas	L 78–89	2–1	Bud Walton Arena (11,455); Fayetteville, Arkansas
11/20/2013*; 7:30 pm, ESPN3		Texas State	W 70–49	3–1	Curtis Culwell Center (3,509); Garland, Texas
11/24/2013*; 1:30 pm, ESPN3		Arkansas–Pine Bluff; Corpus Christi Challenge	W 87–61	4–1	Curtis Culwell Center (3,308); Garland, Texas
11/26/2013*; 7:00 pm, ESPN3		Sam Houston State; Corpus Christi Challenge	W 72–53	5–1	Curtis Culwell Center (3,549); Garland, Texas
11/29/2013*; 6:30 pm, CBSSN		vs. Virginia; Corpus Christi Challenge	L 73–76	5–2	American Bank Center (N/A); Corpus Christi, Texas
11/30/2013*; 5:30 pm, CBSSN		vs. Texas A&M; Corpus Christi Challenge	W 55–52	6–2	American Bank Center (N/A); Corpus Christi, Texas
12/02/2013*; 7:30 pm, ESPN3		McNeese State	W 88–59	7–2	Curtis Culwell Center (3,252); Garland, Texas
12/04/2013*; 7:00 pm, ESPN3		at UIC	W 73–65	8–2	UIC Pavilion (4,438); Chicago, IL
12/18/2013*; 7:30 pm, ESPN3		Texas–Pan American	W 82–56	9–2	Curtis Culwell Center (3,342); Garland, Texas
12/20/2013*; 8:00 pm, RTRM		at Wyoming	W 62–54	10–2	Arena-Auditorium (4,486); Laramie, Wyoming
Conference regular season
01/01/2014; 6:00 pm, ESPNU		at Cincinnati	L 57–65	10–3 (0–1)	Fifth Third Arena (7,239); Cincinnati
01/04/2014; 1:00 pm, ESPNU		No. 17 UConn	W 74–65	11–3 (1–1)	Moody Coliseum (7,166); Dallas
01/12/2014; 1:00 pm, CBSSN		at No. 12 Louisville	L 63–71	11–4 (1–2)	KFC Yum! Center (21,237); Louisville, Kentucky
01/15/2014; 6:00 pm, ESPNU		South Florida	W 71–54	12–4 (2–2)	Moody Coliseum (6,332); Dallas
01/18/2014; 11:00 am, ESPNews		at UCF	W 58–46	13–4 (3–2)	CFE Arena (4,905); Orlando, Florida
01/19/2014*; 12:00 pm, ESPN3		Hofstra; Postponed from 12/07/2013	W 73–49	14–4	Moody Coliseum (6,013); Dallas, TX
01/21/2014; 7:00 pm, ESPNews		Rutgers	W 70–56	15–4 (4–2)	Moody Coliseum (6,042); Dallas
01/26/2014; 2:00 pm, ESPNews		at Houston	W 75–68	16–4 (5–2)	Hofheinz Pavilion (4,567); Houston
01/28/2014; 6:00 pm, ESPNews		at South Florida	L 71–78	16–5 (5–3)	USF Sun Dome (3,407); Tampa, Florida
02/01/2014; 1:00 pm, CBSSN		No. 22 Memphis	W 87–72	17–5 (6–3)	Moody Coliseum (7,058); Dallas
02/06/2014; 7:00 pm, ESPNews		Temple	W 75–52	18–5 (7–3)	Moody Coliseum (6,852); Dallas
02/08/2014; 6:30 pm, ESPNU		No. 7 Cincinnati	W 76–55	19–5 (8–3)	Moody Coliseum (7,278); Dallas
02/13/2014; 6:00 pm, ESPNU	No. 23	at Rutgers	W 77–65	20–5 (9–3)	The RAC (4,094); Piscataway, New Jersey
02/16/2014; 1:00 pm, CBSSN	No. 23	at Temple	L 64–71	20–6 (9–4)	Liacouras Center (6,566); Philadelphia
02/19/2014; 7:00 pm, ESPNews		Houston	W 68–64	21–6 (10–4)	Moody Coliseum (6,991); Dallas
02/23/2014; 1:00 pm, CBSSN		at No. 21 UConn	W 64–55	22–6 (11–4)	Gampel Pavilion (10,167); Storrs, Connecticut
03/01/2014; 3:00 pm, ESPNews	No. 23	UCF	W 70–55	23–6 (12–4)	Moody Coliseum (7,086); Dallas
03/05/2014; 6:00 pm, CBSSN	No. 18	No. 11 Louisville	L 71–84	23–7 (12–5)	Moody Coliseum (7,305); Dallas
03/08/2014; 11:00 am, ESPN2	No. 18	at No. 20 Memphis	L 58–67	23–8 (12–6)	FedEx Forum (18,182); Memphis, Tennessee
American Athletic Conference tournament
03/13/2014; 12:00 pm, ESPNU	No. 25	vs. Houston; Quarterfinals	L 64–68	23–9	FedEx Forum (13,011); Memphis, Tennessee
NIT
03/19/2014*; 8:00 pm, ESPN2	No. (1)	(8) UC Irvine; First round	W 68–54	24–9	Moody Coliseum (5,031); Dallas
03/24/2014*; 8:00 pm, ESPN	No. (1)	(5) LSU; Second round	W 80–67	25–9	Moody Coliseum (7,021); Dallas
03/26/2014*; 8:00 pm, ESPN2	No. (1)	(2) California; Quarterfinals	W 67–65	26–9	Moody Coliseum (7,038); Dallas
04/01/2014*; 6:00 pm, ESPN2	No. (1)	vs. (3) Clemson; Semifinals	W 65–59	27–9	Madison Square Garden (7,193); New York City
04/03/2014*; 6:00 pm, ESPN2	No. (1)	vs. (1) Minnesota; Championship	L 63–65	27–10	Madison Square Garden (5,268); New York City
*Non-conference game. ^{#}Rankings from AP Poll, (#) during NIT is seed within region. (#) Tournament seedings in parentheses. All times are in Central Time.

=== South Florida ===
Date time, TV	Opponent	Result	Record	Site (attendance) city, state
Exhibition
11/04/2013*; 7:00 pm	Barry	W 88–53		USF Sun Dome; Tampa, FL
Regular season
11/09/2013*; 7:00 pm, ESPN3	Tennessee Tech	W 72–62	1–0	USF Sun Dome (4,103); Tampa, FL
11/12/2013*; 7:00 pm, ESPN3	Bethune-Cookman	W 91–65	2–0	USF Sun Dome (3,549); Tampa, FL
11/15/2013*; 8:30 pm, ESPN3	at Bowling Green	W 75–61	3–0	Stroh Center (2,419); Bowling Green, OH
11/22/2013*; 7:00 pm, ESPN3	Stetson	W 72–63	4–0	USF Sun Dome (3,782); Tampa, FL
11/25/2013*; 7:00 pm, ESPNews	No. 5 Oklahoma State	L 67–93	4–1	USF Sun Dome (6,240); Tampa, FL
11/30/2013*; 7:00 pm, ESPN3	Detroit	L 60–65	4–2	USF Sun Dome (3,225); Tampa, FL
12/04/2013*; 7:00 pm	at George Mason	W 68–66	5–2	Patriot Center (4,587); Fairfax, VA
12/07/2013*; 9:00 pm, ESPNU	Alabama	W 66–64	6–2	USF Sun Dome (4,255); Tampa, FL
12/17/2013*; 7:00 pm, ESPNU	Florida Gulf Coast; Las Vegas Classic	W 68–66 ^{2OT}	7–2	USF Sun Dome (4,105); Tampa, FL
12/19/2013*; 7:00 pm, ESPN3	Florida A&M; Las Vegas Classic	W 73–70	8–2	USF Sun Dome (3,433); Tampa, FL
12/22/2013*; 7:00 pm, 1,530	vs. Mississippi State; Las Vegas Classic Semifinals	L 66–71	8–3	Orleans Arena (1,530); Paradise, NV
12/23/2013*; 8:00 pm, CBSSN	vs. Santa Clara; Las Vegas Classic Consolation Game	L 65–66	8–4	Orleans Arena (1,347); Paradise, NV
12/28/2013*; 8:00 pm	at Bradley	W 61–57	9–4	Carver Arena (6,221); Peoria, IL
12/31/2013; 7:00 pm, ESPN2	No. 18 Memphis	L 73–88	9–5 (0–1)	USF Sun Dome (4,063); Tampa, FL
01/04/2014; 4:00 pm, CBSSN	Houston	L 58–67	9–6 (0–2)	USF Sun Dome (3,921); Tampa, FL
01/09/2014; 7:00 pm, ESPNU	at Temple	W 82–75	10–6 (1–2)	Liacouras Center (4,422); Philadelphia, PA
01/15/2014; 7:00 pm, ESPNU	at SMU	L 54–71	10–7 (1–3)	Moody Coliseum (6,332); Dallas, TX
01/18/2014; 5:00 pm, ESPNU	Cincinnati; 19	L 54–61	10–8 (1–4)	USF Sun Dome (5,322); Tampa, FL
01/22/2014; 7:00 pm, ESPNU	No. 12 Louisville	L 47–86	10–9 (1–5)	USF Sun Dome (6,417); Tampa, FL
01/26/2014; 2:00 pm, CBSSN	at No. 23 Memphis	L 58–80	10–10 (1–6)	FedEx Forum (15,627); Memphis, TN
01/28/2014; 7:00 pm, ESPNews	SMU	W 78–71	11–10 (2–6)	USF Sun Dome (3,407); Tampa, FL
02/02/2014; 12:00 pm, CBSSN	at No. 13 Cincinnati	L 45–50	11–11 (2–7)	Fifth Third Arena (10,367); Cincinnati, OH
02/05/2014; 7:00 pm, ESPNews	at Central Florida; War on I-4	W 79–78 ^{OT}	12–11 (3–7)	CFE Arena (6,108); Orlando, FL
02/08/2014; 8:00 pm, ESPNews	Rutgers	L 69–79	12–12 (3–8)	USF Sun Dome (4,605); Tampa, FL
02/12/2014; 7:00 pm, ESPN2	at No. 24 UConn	L 40–83	12–13 (3–9)	XL Center (10,553); Hartford, CT
02/15/2014; 1:30 pm, ESPNews	Central Florida; War on I-4	L 74–75	12–14 (3–10)	USF Sun Dome (5,294); Tampa, FL
02/18/2014; 7:00 pm, CBSSN	at No. 11 Louisville	L 54–80	12–15 (3–11)	KFC Yum! Center (21,655); Louisville, KY
02/26/2014; 7:00 pm, CBSSN	UConn	L 56–61	12–16 (3–12)	USF Sun Dome (5,115); Tampa, FL
03/01/2014; 12:00 pm, ESPNews	at Rutgers	L 73–74	12–17 (3–13)	The RAC (5,611); Piscataway, NJ
03/04/2014; 8:30 pm, ESPNews	at Houston	L 69–78	12–18 (3–14)	Hofheinz Pavilion (3,235); Houston, TX
03/08/2014; 2:00 pm, ESPNews	Temple	L 65–66	12–19 (3–15)	USF Sun Dome (4,073); Tampa, FL
American Athletic Conference tournament
03/12/2014; 7:00 pm, ESPNU	vs. Rutgers; First round	L 68–72	12–20	FedEx Forum (12,102); Memphis, TN
*Non-conference game. ^{#}Rankings from AP Poll. (#) Tournament seedings in parentheses. All times are in Eastern Time.

=== Temple ===
Date time, TV	Opponent	Result	Record	Site (attendance) city, state
Regular season
11/09/2013*; 5:00 pm	at Penn	W 78–73	1–0	Palestra (8,722); Philadelphia, PA
11/11/2013*; 7:00 pm, ESPNU	Kent State	L 77–81	1–1	Liacouras Center (6,589); Philadelphia, PA
11/14/2013*; 7:30 pm, NBCSN	at Towson	L 69–75	1–2	Tiger Arena (3,554); Towson, MD
11/21/2013*; 8:00 pm, ESPN3	vs. Clemson; Charleston Classic 1st Round	L 58–72	1–3	TD Arena (2,311); Charleston, SC
11/22/2013*; 7:00 pm, ESPN3	vs. Georgia; Charleston Classic	W 83–81	2–3	TD Arena; Charleston, SC
11/24/2013*; 6:30 pm, ESPN3	vs. UAB; Charleston Classic	W 87–66	3–3	TD Arena; Charleston, SC
12/04/2013*; 8:00 pm, ESPNews	Saint Joseph's	W 77–69	4–3	Liacouras Center (8,039); Philadelphia, PA
12/07/2013*; 12:00 pm, ESPN2	vs. Texas	L 80–81 ^{OT}	4–4	Wells Fargo Center (6,092); Philadelphia, PA
12/18/2013*; 7:00 pm, ESPN3	Texas Southern	L 89–90	4–5	Liacouras Center (4,682); Philadelphia, PA
12/21/2013*; 5:30 pm	vs. Long Island	W 101–65	5–5	Barclays Center (11,039); Brooklyn, NY
01/01/2014; 8:00 pm, ESPNU	at Rutgers	L 66–71	5–6 (0–1)	Rutgers Athletic Center (3,842); Piscataway, NJ
01/04/2014; 4:00 pm, ESPNews	at UCF	L 76–78	5–7 (0–2)	CFE Arena (4,815); Orlando, FL
01/09/2014; 7:00 pm, ESPNU	South Florida	L 75–82	5–8 (0–3)	Liacouras Center (4,422); Philadelphia, PA
01/11/2014; 3:00 pm, ESPN2	No. 24 Memphis	L 69–79	5–9 (0–4)	Liacouras Center (5,718); Philadelphia, PA
01/14/2014; 9:00 pm, CBSSN	at No. 19 Cincinnati	L 58–69	5–10 (0–5)	Fifth Third Arena (9,864); Cincinnati, OH
01/18/2014*; 12:00 pm, ESPN2	La Salle; ESPN College GameDay	L 68–74	5–11	Palestra (8,722); Philadelphia, PA
01/21/2014; 7:00 pm, CBSSN	at UConn	L 66–90	5–12 (0–6)	XL Center (4,741); Hartford, CT
01/26/2014; 4:00 pm, CBSSN	No. 15 Cincinnati	L 76–80	5–13 (0–7)	Liacouras Center (6,753); Philadelphia, PA
01/29/2014; 7:00 pm, ESPNews	Rutgers	W 88–82	6–13 (1–7)	Liacouras Center (5,039); Philadelphia, PA
02/01/2014*; 4:00 pm, CBSSN	No. 9 Villanova	L 74–90	6–14	Liacouras Center (10,206); Philadelphia, PA
02/06/2014; 8:00 pm, ESPNews	at SMU	L 52–75	6–15 (1–8)	Moody Coliseum (6,852); University Park, TX
02/09/2014; 2:00 pm, ESPNews	at Houston	L 74–88	6–16 (1–9)	Hofheinz Pavilion (3,535); Houston, TX
02/14/2014; 6:00 pm, ESPN2	No. 13 Louisville	L 58–82	6–17 (1–10)	Liacouras Center (5,286); Philadelphia, PA
02/16/2014; 2:00 pm, CBSSN	No. 23 SMU	W 71–64	7–17 (2–10)	Liacouras Center (6,566); Philadelphia, PA
02/20/2014; 9:00 pm, ESPN2	No. 21 UConn	L 55–68	7–18 (2–11)	Liacouras Center (6,053); Philadelphia, PA
02/22/2014; 9:30 pm, ESPNU	at No. 22 Memphis	L 79–82 ^{OT}	7–19 (2–12)	FedEx Forum (18,172); Memphis, TN
02/27/2014; 9:00 pm, ESPN	at No. 7 Louisville	L 66–88	7–20 (2–13)	KFC Yum! Center (21,312); Louisville, KY
03/01/2014; 9:00 pm, ESPNU	Houston	L 79–89	7–21 (2–14)	Liacouras Center (3,978); Philadelphia, PA
03/04/2014; 6:30 pm, ESPNews	UCF	W 86–78	8–21 (3–14)	Liacouras Center (4,063); Philadelphia, PA
03/08/2014; 2:00 pm, ESPNews	at South Florida	L 65–66	9–21 (4–14)	USF Sun Dome (4,073); Tampa, FL
American Athletic Conference tournament
03/12/2014; 9:30 pm, ESPNU	vs. UCF; First round	L 90–94 ^{2OT}	9–22	FedEx Forum (12,102); Memphis, TN
*Non-conference game. ^{#}Rankings from AP Poll. (#) Tournament seedings in parentheses. All times are in Eastern Time.

=== UCF ===
Date time, TV	Opponent	Result	Record	Site (attendance) city, state
Non-conference regular season
11/08/2013*; 8:30 pm	Tampa	W 97–72	1–0	CFE Arena (5,516); Orlando, FL
11/13/2013*; 7:00 pm, ESPNews	Florida State	L 68–80	1–1	CFE Arena (9,343); Orlando, FL
11/17/2013*; 2:00 pm, ESPN3	Bethune-Cookman	W 83–63	2–1	CFE Arena (4,095); Orlando, FL
11/21/2013*; 7:00 pm, ESPN3	at Miami (FL)	W 63–58	3–1	BankUnited Center (4,895); Coral Gables, FL
11/26/2013*; 8:00 pm	at Valparaiso	L 70–85	3–2	Athletics-Recreation Center (2,381); Valparaiso, IN
12/03/2013*; 7:00 pm	at Florida Atlantic	L 64–75	3–3	FAU Arena (1,655); Boca Raton, FL
12/07/2013*; 7:00 pm, ESPN3	Stetson	W 77–58	4–3	CFE Arena (4,203); Orlando, FL
12/11/2013*; 7:00 pm, ESPN3	Howard	W 79–64	5–3	CFE Arena (3,975); Orlando, FL
12/17/2013*; 7:00 pm, ESPN3	Jacksonville	W 104–64	6–3	CFE Arena (4,123); Orlando, FL
12/21/2013*; 4:00 pm	Rio Grande; Jackson Hewitt UCF Holiday Classic	W 86–58	7–3	CFE Arena (4,303); Orlando, FL
12/22/2013*; 2:30 pm, ESPN3	Valparaiso; Jackson Hewitt UCF Holiday Classic	W 90–62	8–3	CFE Arena (4,305); Orlando, FL
American Regular Season
12/31/2013; 5:00 pm, ESPN2	No. 14 Louisville	L 65–90	8–4 (0–1)	CFE Arena (7,094); Orlando, FL
01/04/2014; 4:00 pm, ESPNews	Temple	W 78–76	9–4 (1–1)	CFE Arena (4,815); Orlando, FL
01/11/2014; 6:00 pm, ESPNU	at UConn	L 61–84	9–5 (1–2)	Gampel Pavilion (9,561); Storrs, CT
01/15/2014; 7:00 pm, ESPNews	at Rutgers	L 75–85	9–6 (1–3)	The RAC (4,031); Piscataway, NJ
01/18/2014; 12:00 pm, ESPNews	SMU	L 46–58	9–7 (1–4)	CFE Arena (4,905); Orlando, FL
01/23/2014; 9:00 pm, CBSSN	at No. 15 Cincinnati	L 51–69	9–8 (1–5)	Fifth Third Arena (10,242); Cincinnati, OH
01/29/2014; 7:00 pm, ESPNU	No. 22 Memphis	L 59–69	9–9 (1–6)	CFE Arena (5,161); Orlando, FL
02/01/2014; 9:00 pm, ESPNU	at No. 12 Louisville	L 70–87	9–10 (1–7)	KFC Yum! Center (22,201); Louisville, KY
02/05/2014; 7:00 pm, ESPNews	South Florida; War on I-4	L 78–79 ^{OT}	9–11 (1–8)	CFE Arena (6,108); Orlando, FL
02/09/2014; 6:00 pm, ESPN2	No. 22 Connecticut	L 55–75	9–12 (1–9)	CFE Arena (6,312); Orlando, FL
02/12/2014; 9:00 pm, ESPNU	at Memphis	L 70–76	9–13 (1–10)	FedEx Forum (15,021); Memphis, TN
02/15/2014; 4:30 pm, ESPNews	at South Florida; War on I-4	L 74–75	10–13 (2–10)	USF Sun Dome (5,294); Tampa, FL
02/19/2014; 7:00 pm, ESPNU	No. 7 Cincinnati	L 49–77	10–14 (2–11)	CFE Arena (5,637); Orlando, FL
02/22/2014; 2:00 pm, ESPNews	at Houston	L 84–88	10–15 (2–12)	Hofheinz Pavilion (7,028); Houston, TX
02/26/2014; 7:00 pm, ESPNU	Rutgers	W 67–65	11–15 (3–12)	CFE Arena (4,661); Orlando, FL
03/01/2014; 4:00 pm, ESPNews	at SMU	L 55–70	11–16 (3–13)	Moody Coliseum (7,086); Dallas, TX
03/04/2014; 6:30 pm, ESPNews	at Temple	L 78–86 ^{OT}	11–17 (3–14)	Liacouras Center (4,063); Philadelphia, PA
03/07/2014; 7:30 pm, CBSSN	Houston	W 104–83	12–17 (4–14)	CFE Arena (5,471); Orlando, FL
American Athletic Conference tournament
03/12/2014; 9:30 pm, ESPN2	vs. Temple; First round	W 94–90 ^{2OT}	13–17	FedEx Forum (12,102); Memphis, TN
03/13/2014; 7:00 pm, ESPNU	vs. Cincinnati; Quarterfinals	L 58–61	13–18	FedEx Forum (13,081); Memphis, TN
*Non-conference game. ^{#}Rankings from AP Poll. (#) Tournament seedings in parentheses. All times are in Eastern Time.

=== Weekly honors ===
Throughout the conference regular season, the American Athletic names a player of the week and rookie of the week each Monday.

== Postseason ==
- March 12–15, 2014 at the FedExForum in Memphis, Tennessee

2015 American Athletic Conference men's basketball tournament seeds and results
Seed	School	Conf.	Over.	Tiebreaker	First round March 12	Quarterfinals March 13	Semifinals March 14	Championship March 15
1.	Cincinnati ‡†	15-3	26-5	Won coin toss	Bye	vs. #9 UCF – W, 61-58	vs. #4 Connecticut – L, 56-58	
2.	Louisville ‡†	15-3	26-5		Bye	vs. #7 Rutgers – W, 92-31	vs. #6 Houston – W, 94–65	vs. #4 Connecticut – W, 71–61
3.	SMU †	12-6	23-8	2–0 vs Connecticut	Bye	vs. #6 Houston – L, 64–68		
4.	Connecticut †	12-6	24-7	2–0 vs Memphis	Bye	vs. #5 Memphis – W, 72-53	vs. #1 Cincinnati – W, 58–56	vs. #2 Louisville – L, 61–71
5.	Memphis †	12-6	23-8	0–2 vs Connecticut	Bye	vs. #4 Connecticut – L, 53–72		
6.	Houston †	8-10	16-15		Bye	vs. #3 SMU – W, 68-64	vs. #2 Louisville – L, 65-94	
7.	Rutgers	5-13	11-20		vs. #10 South Florida – W, 72–68	vs. #2 Louisville – L, 31–92		
8.	Temple	4-14	9-21	1–1 vs. SMU	vs. #9 UCF – L, 90-94 2OT			
9.	UCF	4-14	12-17	0–2 vs. SMU	vs. #8 Temple – W, 94–90 2OT	vs. #1 Cincinnati – L, 58–61		
10.	South Florida	3-15	12-19		vs. #7 Rutgers – L, 68-72			
‡ – American regular season champions. † – Received a single-bye in the conference tournament.

=== NCAA tournament ===
Seed	Region	School	First Four	Round of 64	Round of 32	Sweet 16	Elite Eight	Final Four	Championship
4	Midwest	Louisville	Bye	vs. #13 Manhattan – W, 71-64	vs. #5 Saint Louis – W, 66-51	vs. #8 Kentucky – L, 69-74			
5	East	Cincinnati	Bye	vs. #12 Harvard – L, 57-61					
7	East	Connecticut	Bye	vs. #10 St. Joseph's – W, 89-81 OT	vs. #2 Villanova – W, 77-65	vs. #3 Iowa State – W, 81-76	vs. #4 Michigan State – W, 60-54	vs. #1 Florida – W, 63-53	vs. #8 Kentucky – W, 60-54
8	East	Memphis	Bye	vs. #9 George Washington – W, 71-66	vs. #1 Virginia – L, 60-78				
		W–L (%):	0–0 –	3–1 .750	2–1 .667	1–1 .500	1–0 1.000	1–0 1.000	1–0 1.000 Total: 9–3 .750

=== National Invitation tournament ===
Seed	Bracket	School	First round	Second round	Quarterfinals	Semifinals	Finals
1	SMU	SMU	vs. #8 UC Irvine – W, 68-54	vs. #5 LSU – W, 80-67	vs. #2 California – W, 67-65	vs. #3 Clemson – W, 65-59	vs. #1 Minnesota – L, 63-65
		W–L (%):	1–0 1.000	1–0 1.000	1–0 1.000	1–0 1.000	0–1 .000 Total: 4–1 .800

== NBA draft ==
The following list includes all AAC players who were drafted in the 2014 NBA draft.

Player	Position	School	Round	Pick	Team
Shabazz Napier	PG	Connecticut	1	24	Charlotte Hornets
DeAndre Daniels	SF	Connecticut	2	37	Toronto Raptors
Russ Smith	PG/SG	Louisville	2	47	Philadelphia 76ers
