= 2014 American Athletic Conference men's basketball tournament =

- Tournament Logo
- Classification: Division I
- Season: 2013–14
- Teams: 10
- Site: FedExForum; Memphis
- Champions: Louisville (1st title)
- Attendance: 63,636
- Television: ESPN, ESPN2, ESPNU

2013–14 American Athletic Conference men's basketball standings
	Conf.				Overall
Team	W		L	PCT	W		L	PCT
No. 5 Louisville* †	15	–	3	.833	31	–	6	.838
No. 15 Cincinnati	15	–	3	.833	27	–	7	.794
No. 18 UConn	12	–	6	.667	32	–	8	.800
SMU	12	–	6	.667	27	–	10	.730
Memphis	12	–	6	.667	24	–	10	.706
Houston	8	–	10	.444	17	–	16	.515
Rutgers	5	–	13	.278	12	–	21	.364
UCF	4	–	14	.222	13	–	18	.419
Temple	4	–	14	.222	9	–	22	.290
South Florida	3	–	15	.167	12	–	20	.375
† The American Tournament winner As of March 15th, 2014; *Louisville: 29 reg. season games, 3 postseason games vacated due to sanctions against the program; Disputed Record-(31-6)(15-3); Rankings from AP poll

The 2014 American Athletic Conference men's basketball tournament was the first conference tournament of the American Athletic Conference (The American). It was the first conference tournament held since the split of the original Big East Conference. While The American is the legal successor to the old Big East, the rights to conference tournament in Madison Square Garden were retained by the new Big East, so the 2014 tournament was numbered as the new conference's first edition. The tournament was held March 12–15 in the FedExForum in Memphis, Tennessee and decided a champion of the 2013–14 American Athletic Conference men's basketball season (like most NCAA conferences, The American recognizes both regular-season and tournament champions; Cincinnati and Louisville shared the regular-season title). The teams in the conference competed in a ten-team single-elimination tournament for an automatic bid to the 2014 NCAA tournament.

In the 2013–14 season, The American consisted of 10 members involved in the rearrangement of conferences between the 2013 and 2014 seasons. (Cincinnati, Connecticut, and South Florida) had been full members of the original Big East. One (Temple) had been a football-only Big East member before entering into full membership in The American. The remaining four schools (Houston, Memphis, SMU, and UCF) had previously been members of Conference USA.

== Seeds ==
All teams in the American qualified for the tournament. Teams were seeded based on conference record and then a tie breaker system was used. Teams seeded 7–10 had to play in the opening round and teams seeded 1–6 received a bye to the second round. Louisville and Cincinnati finished with identical 15-3 records and shared the regular season title. Since the Cardinals and Bearcats had split their meetings during the regular season, a coin toss was held to determine the #1 seed in the tournament, which was won by Cincinnati.

Seed	School	Conference	Overall	Tiebreaker
1^{†‡}	Cincinnati	15–3	26–5	Won coin toss
2^{†‡}	Louisville	15–3	26–5	
3^{†}	SMU	12-6	23–8	2–0 vs Connecticut
4^{†}	Connecticut	12–6	24–7	2–0 vs Memphis
5^{†}	Memphis	12–6	23–8	0–2 vs Connecticut
6^{†}	Houston	8–10	16–15	
7	Rutgers	5–13	11–20	
8	Temple	4–14	9–21	1–1 vs. SMU
9	UCF	4–14	12–17	0–2 vs. SMU
10	South Florida	3–15	12–19	
‡ – American Athletic Conference regular season champions. † – Received a first-round bye in the conference tournament. Overall record are as of the end of the regular season.

== Schedule ==
All tournament games are nationally televised on an ESPN network:

Session	Game	Time*	Matchup^{#}	Television	Attendance
First round – Wednesday, March 12
1	1	7:00 pm	#7 Rutgers 72 vs. #10 South Florida 68	ESPNU	12,102
1	2	9:30 pm	#8 Temple 90 vs. #9 UCF 94	ESPN2	12,102
Quarterfinals – Thursday, March 13
2	3	1:00 pm	#3 SMU 64 vs. #6 Houston 68	ESPNU	13,011
2	4	3:00 pm	#2 Louisville 92 vs. #7 Rutgers 31	ESPNU	13,011
3	5	7:00 pm	#1 Cincinnati 61 vs. #9 UCF 58	ESPNU	13,081
3	6	9:00 pm	#4 Connecticut 72 vs. #5 Memphis 53	ESPNU	13,081
Semifinals – Friday, March 14
4	7	7:00 pm	#2 Louisville 94 vs. #6 Houston 65	ESPN2	11,888
4	8	9:00 pm	#1 Cincinnati 56 vs. #4 Connecticut 58	ESPN2	11,888
Championship – Saturday, March 15
5	9	6:00 pm	#4 Connecticut 61 vs. #2 Louisville 71	ESPN	13,554
*Game times in ET. #-Rankings denote tournament seeding.

== Bracket ==
First round Wednesday, March 12
8	Temple	90
9	UCF	94^{2OT}
7	Rutgers	72
10	South Florida	68

Quarterfinals; Thursday, March 13
1	#13 Cincinnati	61
9	UCF	58
4	#21 Connecticut	72
5	#19 Memphis	53
2	#5 Louisville	92
7	Rutgers	31
3	#25 SMU	64
6	Houston	68

Semifinals; Friday, March 14
1	#13 Cincinnati	56
4	#21 Connecticut	58
2	#5 Louisville	94
6	Houston	65

Championship; Saturday, March 15
4	#21 Connecticut	61
2	#5 Louisville	71
