= 2013–14 UCF Knights men's basketball team =

American college basketball season

2013–14 UCF Knights men's basketball
- Conference: American Athletic Conference
- Record: 13–18 (4–14 The American)
- Head coach: Donnie Jones
- Assistant coaches: Shawn Finney; Darren Tillis; Tim Thomas
- Home arena: CFE Arena

2013–14 American Athletic Conference men's basketball standings
	Conf.				Overall
Team	W		L	PCT	W		L	PCT
No. 5 Louisville* †	15	–	3	.833	31	–	6	.838
No. 15 Cincinnati	15	–	3	.833	27	–	7	.794
No. 18 UConn	12	–	6	.667	32	–	8	.800
SMU	12	–	6	.667	27	–	10	.730
Memphis	12	–	6	.667	24	–	10	.706
Houston	8	–	10	.444	17	–	16	.515
Rutgers	5	–	13	.278	12	–	21	.364
UCF	4	–	14	.222	13	–	18	.419
Temple	4	–	14	.222	9	–	22	.290
South Florida	3	–	15	.167	12	–	20	.375
† The American Tournament winner As of March 15, 2014; *Louisville: 29 reg. season games, 3 postseason games vacated due to sanctions against the program; Disputed Record-(31-6)(15-3); Rankings from AP poll

The 2013–14 UCF Knights men's basketball team represented the University of Central Florida during the 2013–14 NCAA Division I men's basketball season. The Knights competed in Division I of the National Collegiate Athletic Association (NCAA) in the American Athletic Conference (The American). The Knights, in the program's 45th season of basketball, were led by fourth-year head coach Donnie Jones, and played their home games at the CFE Arena on the university's main campus in Orlando, Florida.

This was UCF's first season as a member of The American. UCF played in Conference USA from 2005 to 2013.

They finished the season 13–18, 4–14 in AAC play to finish in a tie for eighth place. They advanced to the quarterfinals of the AAC tournament, where they lost to Cincinnati.

== Previous season ==
In the previous year, the Knights finished the season 20–11, 9–7 in C-USA play to finish in a tie for fourth place. Due to NCAA sanctions, UCF was ineligible for the 2013 Conference USA men's basketball tournament or a post-season berth.

== Roster ==
2013–14 UCF Knights men's basketball team
Players
Coaches

Pos.	#	Name	Height	Weight	Year	Hometown
F	52	Staphon Blair	6 ft 9 in (2.06 m)	250 lb (113 kg)	So	Fort Lauderdale, FL
G	10	Tyler Coons	6 ft 2 in (1.88 m)	185 lb (84 kg)	So	Orlando, FL
G	22	Brandon Goodwin	6 ft 0 in (1.83 m)	175 lb (79 kg)	Fr	Norcross, GA
G/F	24	Steven Haney	6 ft 6 in (1.98 m)	190 lb (86 kg)	Fr	Fort Lauderdale, FL
F	15	Dylan Karell	6 ft 11 in (2.11 m)	230 lb (104 kg)	So	North Miami Beach, FL
G	21	Isaac Lang	6 ft 1 in (1.85 m)	195 lb (88 kg)	Sr	Tampa, FL
C	34	Justin McBride	6 ft 10 in (2.08 m)	310 lb (141 kg)	Fr	Starke, FL
F	5	Eugene McCrory	6 ft 8 in (2.03 m)	240 lb (109 kg)	Jr	Riverdale, MD
G	11	Calvin Newell	6 ft 1 in (1.85 m)	210 lb (95 kg)	Sr	Philadelphia, PA
F	1	Tristan Spurlock	6 ft 8 in (2.03 m)	230 lb (104 kg)	RS Sr	Woodbridge, VA
G/F	3	Isaiah Sykes	6 ft 6 in (1.98 m)	220 lb (100 kg)	Sr	Detroit, MI
G	4	Daiquan Walker	6 ft 2 in (1.88 m)	180 lb (82 kg)	So	Philadelphia, PA
G	12	Matt Williams	6 ft 5 in (1.96 m)	220 lb (100 kg)	So	Orlando, FL
F	32	Kasey Wilson	6 ft 7 in (2.01 m)	225 lb (102 kg)	Jr	North Port, FL

Head coach

- Donnie Jones (Pikeville)

Assistant coach(es)

- Shawn Finney (Fairmont)
- Darren Tillis (Paul Quinn)
- Tim Thomas (Wheeling Jesuit)

Legend

- (C) Team captain
- (S) Suspended
- (I) Ineligible
- (W) Walk-on
- Injured
- Current redshirt

Roster
Last update: October 14, 2013

== Schedule and results ==
Date time, TV	Opponent	Result	Record	Site (attendance) city, state
Non-conference regular season
11/08/2013*; 8:30 pm	Tampa	W 97–72	1–0	CFE Arena (5,516); Orlando, FL
11/13/2013*; 7:00 pm, ESPNews	Florida State	L 68–80	1–1	CFE Arena (9,343); Orlando, FL
11/17/2013*; 2:00 pm, ESPN3	Bethune-Cookman	W 83–63	2–1	CFE Arena (4,095); Orlando, FL
11/21/2013*; 7:00 pm, ESPN3	at Miami (FL)	W 63–58	3–1	BankUnited Center (4,895); Coral Gables, FL
11/26/2013*; 8:00 pm	at Valparaiso	L 70–85	3–2	Athletics-Recreation Center (2,381); Valparaiso, IN
12/03/2013*; 7:00 pm	at Florida Atlantic	L 64–75	3–3	FAU Arena (1,655); Boca Raton, FL
12/07/2013*; 7:00 pm, ESPN3	Stetson	W 77–58	4–3	CFE Arena (4,203); Orlando, FL
12/11/2013*; 7:00 pm, ESPN3	Howard	W 79–64	5–3	CFE Arena (3,975); Orlando, FL
12/17/2013*; 7:00 pm, ESPN3	Jacksonville	W 104–64	6–3	CFE Arena (4,123); Orlando, FL
12/21/2013*; 4:00 pm	Rio Grande; Jackson Hewitt UCF Holiday Classic	W 86–58	7–3	CFE Arena (4,303); Orlando, FL
12/22/2013*; 2:30 pm, ESPN3	Valparaiso; Jackson Hewitt UCF Holiday Classic	W 90–62	8–3	CFE Arena (4,305); Orlando, FL
American regular season
12/31/2013; 5:00 pm, ESPN2	No. 14 Louisville	L 65–90	8–4 (0–1)	CFE Arena (7,094); Orlando, FL
01/04/2014; 4:00 pm, ESPNews	Temple	W 78–76	9–4 (1–1)	CFE Arena (4,815); Orlando, FL
01/11/2014; 6:00 pm, ESPNU	at UConn	L 61–84	9–5 (1–2)	Gampel Pavilion (9,561); Storrs, CT
01/15/2014; 7:00 pm, ESPNews	at Rutgers	L 75–85	9–6 (1–3)	The RAC (4,031); Piscataway, NJ
01/18/2014; 12:00 pm, ESPNews	SMU	L 46–58	9–7 (1–4)	CFE Arena (4,905); Orlando, FL
01/23/2014; 9:00 pm, CBSSN	at No. 15 Cincinnati	L 51–69	9–8 (1–5)	Fifth Third Arena (10,242); Cincinnati, OH
01/29/2014; 7:00 pm, ESPNU	No. 22 Memphis	T 59–59	9–9 (1–6)	CFE Arena (5,161); Orlando, FL
02/01/2014; 9:00 pm, ESPNU	at No. 12 Louisville	L 70–87	9–10 (1–7)	KFC Yum! Center (22,201); Louisville, KY
02/05/2014; 7:00 pm, ESPNews	South Florida; War on I-4	L 78–79 ^{OT}	9–11 (1–8)	CFE Arena (6,108); Orlando, FL
02/09/2014; 6:00 pm, ESPN2	No. 22 Connecticut	L 55–75	9–12 (1–9)	CFE Arena (6,312); Orlando, FL
02/12/2014; 9:00 pm, ESPNU	at Memphis	L 70–76	9–13 (1–10)	FedEx Forum (15,021); Memphis, TN
02/15/2014; 4:30 pm, ESPNews	at South Florida; War on I-4	L 74–75	10–13 (2–10)	USF Sun Dome (5,294); Tampa, FL
02/19/2014; 7:00 pm, ESPNU	No. 7 Cincinnati	L 49–77	10–14 (2–11)	CFE Arena (5,637); Orlando, FL
02/22/2014; 2:00 pm, ESPNews	at Houston	L 84–88	10–15 (2–12)	Hofheinz Pavilion (7,028); Houston, TX
02/26/2014; 7:00 pm, ESPNU	Rutgers	W 67–65	11–15 (3–12)	CFE Arena (4,661); Orlando, FL
03/01/2014; 4:00 pm, ESPNews	at SMU	L 55–70	11–16 (3–13)	Moody Coliseum (7,086); Dallas, TX
03/04/2014; 6:30 pm, ESPNews	at Temple	L 78–86 ^{OT}	11–17 (3–14)	Liacouras Center (4,063); Philadelphia, PA
03/07/2014; 7:30 pm, CBSSN	Houston	W 104–83	12–17 (4–14)	CFE Arena (5,471); Orlando, FL
American Athletic Conference tournament
03/12/2014; 9:30 pm, ESPN2	vs. Temple; First round	W 94–90 ^{2OT}	13–17	FedEx Forum (12,102); Memphis, TN
03/13/2014; 7:00 pm, ESPNU	vs. Cincinnati; Quarterfinals	L 58–61	13–18	FedEx Forum (13,081); Memphis, TN
*Non-conference game. ^{#}Rankings from AP Poll. (#) Tournament seedings in parentheses. All times are in Eastern Time.
