= 2013–14 Houston Cougars men's basketball team =

American college basketball season

2013–14 Houston Cougars men's basketball
- Conference: American Athletic Conference
- Record: 17–16 (8–10 The American)
- Head coach: James Dickey (4th season)
- Associate head coach: Alvin Brooks
- Assistant coaches: Johnny Estelle; Ronnie Hamilton
- Home arena: Hofheinz Pavilion

2013–14 American Athletic Conference men's basketball standings
	Conf.				Overall
Team	W		L	PCT	W		L	PCT
No. 5 Louisville* †	15	–	3	.833	31	–	6	.838
No. 15 Cincinnati	15	–	3	.833	27	–	7	.794
No. 18 UConn	12	–	6	.667	32	–	8	.800
SMU	12	–	6	.667	27	–	10	.730
Memphis	12	–	6	.667	24	–	10	.706
Houston	8	–	10	.444	17	–	16	.515
Rutgers	5	–	13	.278	12	–	21	.364
UCF	4	–	14	.222	13	–	18	.419
Temple	4	–	14	.222	9	–	22	.290
South Florida	3	–	15	.167	12	–	20	.375
† The American Tournament winner As of March 15, 2014; *Louisville: 29 reg. season games, 3 postseason games vacated due to sanctions against the program; Disputed Record-(31-6)(15-3); Rankings from AP poll

The 2013–14 Houston Cougars men's basketball team represented the University of Houston during the 2013–14 NCAA Division I men's basketball season. The season marked the first for the Cougars as members of the American Athletic Conference. The team, coached by James Dickey in his fourth year, played their home games at Hofheinz Pavilion. They finished the season 17–16, 8–10 in conference play to finish in sixth place. They advanced to the semifinals of the American Conference tournament where they lost to Louisville.

After the season, Dickey stepped down for personal reasons. He was 64–62 in four seasons, and was replaced by Kelvin Sampson.

== Pre-season ==
The Cougars' off-season had been defined primarily by the number of departures from the program. On May 14, the school announced that it had granted permission to sophomore point guard J. J. Thompson to transfer to another school. No reason was given. Ten days later, the school announced that four-star 2012 class recruit Valentine Izundu was also granted release from the program. Like Thompson, no reason why given for Izundu's departure, but it was noted that he had seen very limited playing time in his previous season as a freshman. However, one month after announcing his leave, Izundu decided to return. In his statement, he apologized to Coach Dickey and teammates and mentioned that he made a mistake in leaving the team. On June 1, the program announced that Michael Young, former Cougar player and Phi Slama Jama member during the 1980–84 seasons, would not be retained as Director of Basketball Operations. Young was offered a reassignment in the program, but refused it and decided to leave the school. As a result, his son Joe Young, the Cougars' leading scorer during the 2012–13 season also decided to leave the program and transfer to Oregon.

Despite the departures, the Cougars were still able to build by signing Ohio Player of the Year and three-star recruit Jaaron Simmons. The point guard out of Archbishop Alter High School signed a national letter of intent on April 18, choosing the Cougars over Butler and Dayton, among others. Simmons mentioned that the opportunity to play with standout players Danuel House, Joe Young, and TaShawn Thomas helped in his decision to sign with Houston. In June, former Baylor guard L. J. Rose announced his transfer to Houston to be closer to his mother who had been diagnosed with lupus. Rose was ranked 63rd in the ESPN100 Class of 2012 and 9th at guard. The Cougars applied for a waiver to the NCAA to allow Rose to play for the team immediately, and the waiver was granted on August 20. The third offseason addition to the Cougars was 6'9" Egyptian-born post player Ahmed Hamdy, who had international experience at the 2010 FIBA Under-17 World Championship with the Egyptian national team.

=== Departures ===
Name	Number	Pos.	Height	Weight	Year	Hometown	Notes
Joe Young	0	G	6'3"	185	Sophomore	Houston, Texas	Left program when father Michael was not retained as Director of Basketball Operations; transferred to Oregon
J. J. Thompson	3	G	6'0"	185	Sophomore	Irving, Texas	Granted release to transfer to another school
Leon Gibson	15	F	6'9"	245	Senior	Los Angeles, California	Graduated

=== Incoming transfers ===
Name	Number	Pos.	Height	Weight	Year	Hometown	Notes
L. J. Rose		G	6'4"	190	Sophomore	Houston, Texas	Transferred from Baylor

=== Class of 2013 signees ===
College recruiting
Name	Hometown	School	Height	Weight	Commit date
Jaaron Simmons; PG	Kettering, Ohio	Archbishop Alter HS	5 ft 11 in (1.80 m)	175 lb (79 kg)	Mar 31, 2013
Jaaron Simmons; PG	Recruit ratings: Scout: Rivals: (78)				
Ahmed Hamdy; C	Alexandria, Egypt	Trent Internationale (Sugar Land, Texas)	6 ft 9 in (2.06 m)	255 lb (116 kg)	Jun 20, 2013
Ahmed Hamdy; C	Recruit ratings: Scout: Rivals: (NR)				
Overall recruit ranking: Scout: NR Rivals: NR ESPN: NR
Note: In many cases, Scout, Rivals, 247Sports, On3, and ESPN may conflict in their listings of height and weight.; In these cases, the average was taken. ESPN grades are on a 100-point scale.; Sources: "Houston Basketball Commitment List". Rivals.; "2013 Houston Basketball Commitment List". Scout.; "ESPN". ESPN.; "Scout.com Team Recruiting Rankings". Scout.; "2013 Team Ranking". Rivals.

== Roster ==
2013–14 Houston Cougars men's basketball team
Players
Coaches

Pos.	#	Name	Height	Weight	Year	Hometown
F	0	Danrad Knowles	6 ft 10 in (2.08 m)	190 lb (86 kg)	RS So	Houston, Texas
F	1	Mikhail McLean	6 ft 8 in (2.03 m)	205 lb (93 kg)	RS Jr	Houston, Texas
G	2	Brandon Morris	6 ft 0 in (1.83 m)	185 lb (84 kg)	Sr	Alexandria, Louisiana
G	3	Jaaron Simmons	6 ft 1 in (1.85 m)	175 lb (79 kg)	Fr	Dayton, Ohio
G	4	LeRon Barnes	6 ft 6 in (1.98 m)	195 lb (88 kg)	RS So	Stonewall, Louisiana
G	5	L.J. Rose	6 ft 4 in (1.93 m)	190 lb (86 kg)	So	Houston, Texas
G	12	Jimmy Jones	5 ft 10 in (1.78 m)	160 lb (73 kg)	RS Sr	Plano, Texas
G	14	Tione Womack	6 ft 1 in (1.85 m)	170 lb (77 kg)	Sr	Baltimore, Maryland
F	20	Adam Drexler	6 ft 5 in (1.96 m)	205 lb (93 kg)	So	Houston, Texas
G	21	Jherrod Stiggers	6 ft 5 in (1.96 m)	210 lb (95 kg)	RS So	Terrell, Texas
G	23	Danuel House	6 ft 7 in (2.01 m)	195 lb (88 kg)	So	Sugar Land, Texas
G	24	Lawrence Paye	6 ft 0 in (1.83 m)	185 lb (84 kg)	Sr	Houston, Texas
C	25	Ahmed Hamdy	6 ft 9 in (2.06 m)	255 lb (116 kg)	Fr	Alexandria, Egypt
F	35	TaShawn Thomas	6 ft 8 in (2.03 m)	215 lb (98 kg)	Jr	Killeen, Texas
C	45	Valentine Izundu	6 ft 10 in (2.08 m)	215 lb (98 kg)	So	Houston, Texas
F	55	J.J. Richardson	6 ft 8 in (2.03 m)	245 lb (111 kg)	RS Sr	Missouri City, Texas

Head coach

- James Dickey (Central Arkansas)

Assistant coach(es)

- Alvin Brooks (Lamar)
- Johnny Estelle (Texas A&M-Kingsville)
- Ronnie Hamilton (Duke)

Legend

- (C) Team captain
- (S) Suspended
- (I) Ineligible
- (W) Walk-on
- Injured
- Current redshirt

Roster
Last update: 2013-11-17

== Schedule and results ==
On May 21, the Cougars participation as one of the four hosts in the 2013 Legends Classic alongside Pittsburgh, Stanford, and Texas Tech was announced. Houston hosted a pair of regional round games between November 17–21 and then traveled to Brooklyn to participate in the championship round with the other four hosts on November 25–26 at the Barclays Center.

The Cougars' 2013–14 schedule was announced on August 21, featuring 17 home games. The schedule's highlights included round-robin play against the other nine American Athletic Conference members, the four previously announced Legends Classic games, a road game against former Southwest Conference rival Texas A&M, and a neutral site matchup against crosstown rival Rice at the Toyota Center. All of Houston's 18 conference games and the two final games of the Legends Classic tournament were televised on the ESPN family of networks or CBS Sports Network.

Date time, TV	Opponent	Result	Record	Site (attendance) city, state
Exhibition
Nov 5*; 7:00 pm	St. Thomas	W 81–63		Hofheinz Pavilion (2,435); Houston
Non-conference regular season
Nov 8*; 8:00 pm, ESPN3	Texas State	W 76–70	1–0	Hofheinz Pavilion (3,123); Houston
Nov 11*; 7:00 pm	at Texas–Pan American	W 77–65	2–0	UTPA Fieldhouse (1,432); Edinburg, Texas
Nov 14*; 7:00 pm, ESPN3	UTSA	W 80–62	3–0	Hofheinz Pavilion (2,800); Houston
Nov 17*; 1:00 pm, ESPN3	Lehigh; Legends Classic – Houston Regional Game 1	W 80–66	4–0	Hofheinz Pavilion (2,635); Houston
Nov 21*; 7:00 pm, ESPN3	Howard; Legends Classic – Houston Regional Game 2	W 75–62	5–0	Hofheinz Pavilion (2,815); Houston
Nov 25*; 8:30 pm, ESPN2	vs. Stanford; Legends Classic – Semifinals	L 76–86	5–1	Barclays Center (4,142); Brooklyn, New York
Nov 26*; 6:00 pm, ESPN3	vs. Texas Tech; Legends Classic – Consolation Game	L 64–76	5–2	Barclays Center (3,514); Brooklyn, New York
Nov 30*; 7:00 pm, ESPN3	Texas A&M–Corpus Christi	W 78–67	6–2	Hofheinz Pavilion (3,015); Houston
Dec 4*; 7:00 pm, ESPN3/FSN	at Texas A&M	L 57–74	6–3	Reed Arena (4,850); College Station, Texas
Dec 7*; 5:00 pm, ESPN3	San Jose State	L 68–72	6–4	Hofheinz Pavilion (3,105); Houston
Dec 9*; 6:30 pm, ESPN3	Alcorn State	W 89–58	7–4	Hofheinz Pavilion (2,833); Houston
Dec 14*; 7:05 pm	at Louisiana–Lafayette	L 76–79 ^{OT}	7–5	Cajundome (3,069); Lafayette, Louisiana
Dec 21*; 3:30 pm, CSS/CSNH	vs. Rice; Lone Star Showcase	W 54–52	8–5	Toyota Center (5,907); Houston
American Athletic Conference regular season
Dec 31; 8:00 pm, ESPN2	No. 17 UConn	W 75–71	9–5 (1–0)	Hofheinz Pavilion (4,035); Houston
Jan 4; 3:00 pm, CBSSN	at South Florida	W 67–58	10–5 (2–0)	USF Sun Dome (3,921); Tampa, Florida
Jan 7; 8:00 pm, CBSSN	Cincinnati	L 60–61	10–6 (2–1)	Hofheinz Pavilion (3,804); Houston
Jan 16; 6:00 pm, CBSSN	at No. 18 Louisville	L 52–91	10–7 (2–2)	KFC Yum! Center (21,132); Louisville, Kentucky
Jan 19; 12:00 pm, CBSSN	Rutgers	W 77–55	11–7 (3–2)	Hofheinz Pavilion (3,115); Houston
Jan 23; 7:00 pm, ESPNews	at No. 23 Memphis	L 59–82	11–8 (3–3)	FedEx Forum (15,702); Memphis, Tennessee
Jan 26; 2:00 pm, ESPNews	SMU	L 68–75	11–9 (3–4)	Hofheinz Pavilion (4,567); Houston
Jan 30; 8:00 pm, CBSSN	at Connecticut	L 43–80	11–10 (3–5)	Gampel Pavilion (9,312); Storrs, Connecticut
Feb 1; 3:30 pm, ESPNews	at Rutgers	L 70–93	11–11 (3–6)	The RAC (5,616); Piscataway, New Jersey
Feb 5; 8:00 pm, ESPNU	No. 14 Louisville	L 62–77	11–12 (3–7)	Hofheinz Pavilion (7,247); Houston
Feb 9; 1:00 pm, ESPNews	Temple	W 88–74	12–12 (4–7)	Hofheinz Pavilion (3,535); Houston
Feb 15; 2:00 pm, ESPNU	at No. 10 Cincinnati	L 62–73	12–13 (4–8)	Fifth Third Arena (13,176); Cincinnati
Feb 19; 7:00 pm, ESPNews	at SMU	L 64–68	12–14 (4–9)	Moody Coliseum (6,991); Dallas
Feb 22; 1:00 pm, ESPNews	UCF	W 88–84	13–14 (5–9)	Hofheinz Pavilion (7,028); Houston
Feb 27; 8:00 pm, CBSSN	No. 21 Memphis	W 77–68	14–14 (6–9)	Hofheinz Pavilion (3,628); Houston
Mar 1; 8:00 pm, ESPNU	at Temple	W 89–79	15–14 (7–9)	Liacouras Center (3,978); Philadelphia
Mar 4; 7:30 pm, ESPNews	South Florida	W 79–68	16–14 (8–9)	Hofheinz Pavilion (3,235); Houston
Mar 7; 6:00 pm, CBSSN	at UCF	L 83–104	16–15 (8–10)	CFE Arena (5,471); Orlando, Florida
American Athletic Conference tournament
Mar 13; 12:00 pm, ESPNU	vs. No. 25 SMU; Quarterfinals	W 68–64	17–15	FedEx Forum (13,011); Memphis, Tennessee
Mar 14; 6:00 pm, ESPN2	vs. No. 5 Louisville; Semifinals	L 65–94	17–16	FedEx Forum (11,888); Memphis, Tennessee
*Non-conference game. ^{#}Rankings from AP Poll. (#) Tournament seedings in parentheses. All times are in Central Time.
