= 2013–14 Big South Conference men's basketball season =

2013–14 Big South Men's Basketball Season
- League: NCAA Division I
- Sport: Basketball
- Teams: 12
- TV partner(s): ESPN, MASN

Regular Season
- Season champions: High Point (North); Coastal Carolina (South)
- Season MVP: John Brown
- Top scorer: Andrew Rowsey

Tournament
- Champions: Coastal Carolina
- Runners-up: Winthrop
- Finals MVP: Warren Gillis

Basketball seasons
- ← 12–13 14–15 →

2013–14 Big South men's basketball standings
	Conf.				Overall
Team	W		L	PCT	W		L	PCT
North
High Point	12	–	4	.750	16	–	15	.516
VMI	11	–	5	.688	22	–	13	.629
Radford	10	–	6	.625	22	–	13	.629
Campbell	6	–	10	.375	12	–	20	.375
Liberty	5	–	11	.313	11	–	21	.344
Longwood	3	–	13	.188	8	–	24	.250
South
Coastal Carolina †	11	–	5	.688	21	–	13	.618
Winthrop	10	–	6	.625	20	–	13	.606
Gardner–Webb	10	–	6	.625	18	–	15	.545
UNC Asheville	10	–	6	.625	17	–	15	.531
Charleston Southern	6	–	10	.375	13	–	18	.419
Presbyterian	2	–	14	.125	6	–	26	.188
† 2014 Big South tournament winner

The 2013–14 Big South Conference men's basketball season began on November 8, 2013, and concluded in March with the 2014 Big South Conference men's basketball tournament played at the HTC Center in Conway, South Carolina.

It was the Big South's 29th season of men's basketball, and the final year for one member, the VMI Keydets, who leave for the Southern Conference beginning in 2014–15. It was also the second year in which the conference utilized a six-team division format.

== Awards and honors ==
- Player of the Year: John Brown, High Point
- Freshman of the Year: Andrew Rowsey, UNC Asheville
- Defense Player of the Year: D. J. Covington, VMI
- Coach of the Year: Scott Cherry, High Point
- Scholar-Athlete of the Year: Mike Byron, Gardner–Webb

=== All–Big South Teams ===
==== First Team ====
Name	School	Pos.	Year
John Brown	High Point	F	R–Soph.
D. J. Covington	VMI	C	Senior
Javonte Green	Radford	F	Junior
Rodney Glasgow	VMI	PG	Senior
Andrew Rowsey	UNC Asheville	G	Freshman

==== Second Team ====
Name	School	Pos.	Year
Warren Gillis	Coastal Carolina	F	Junior
Jerome Hill	Gardner–Webb	F	Sophomore
Q. J. Peterson	VMI	G	Freshman
Jaron Lane	UNC Asheville	F	R–Senior
D. J. Cunningham	UNC Asheville	C	R–Senior

==== Honorable Mention ====
Name	School	Pos.	Year
Elijah Wilson	Coastal Carolina	G	Freshman
Tristan Carey	Longwood	G	Senior
Jordan Downing	Presbyterian	G	R–Junior
Devante Wallace	High Point	G	Junior
Keon Johnson	Winthrop	G	Freshman

==== All-Freshman ====
Name	School	Pos.
Andrew Rowsey	UNC Asheville	G
Q. J. Peterson	VMI	G
Elijah Wilson	Coastal Carolina	G
Keon Johnson	Winthrop	G
Tyrell Nelson	Gardner–Webb	F

==== All-Academic ====
Name	School	Pos.	Year
Paul Gombwer	Charleston Southern	F	Junior
Michael Enanga	Coastal Carolina	F	Sophomore
Mike Byron	Gardner–Webb	C	Senior
Haiishen McIntyre	High Point	G	Sophomore
John Caleb Sanders	Liberty	G	Senior
Jeylani Dublin	Longwood	F	R–Junior
Kyle Noreen	Radford	G/F	Junior
James Bourne	Winthrop	F	Junior

=== NABC All–District Team ===
District 20 First Team

- John Brown, High Point
- D. J. Covington, VMI

District 20 Second Team

- Rodney Glasgow, VMI
- Andrew Rowsey, UNC Asheville

== Conference Schedules ==
=== Conference matrix ===
This table summarizes the head-to-head results between teams in conference play. Teams play each team in their division twice and play teams out of their division once, totaling 16 games.

	CU	CSU	CCU	GWU	HPU	LU	LwU	PC	RU	UNCA	VMI	WU	Total
Campbell	–	0–1	0–1	0–1	1–1	0–2	1–1	1–0	1–1	0–1	1–1	0–1	6–10
Charleston Southern	1–0	–	1–1	1–1	0–1	1–0	0–1	2–0	0–1	0–2	0–1	1–1	6–10
Coastal Carolina	1–0	1–1	–	2–0	0–1	1–0	1–0	2–0	1–0	1–1	1–0	0–2	11–5
Gardner–Webb	1–0	1–1	0–2	–	1–0	1–0	1–0	2–0	1–0	0–2	0–1	2–0	10–6
High Point	1–1	1–0	1–0	0–1	–	2–0	1–0	1–0	1–1	1–0	1–1	1–0	12–4
Liberty	2–0	0–1	0–1	0–1	0–2	–	1–1	1–0	0–2	0–1	1–1	0–1	5–11
Longwood	1–1	1–0	0–1	0–1	0–1	1–1	–	0–1	0–2	0–1	0–2	0–1	3–13
Presbyterian	0–1	0–2	0–2	0–2	0–1	0–1	1–0	–	0–1	1–1	0–1	0–2	2–14
Radford	1–1	1–0	0–1	0–1	1–1	2–0	2–0	1–0	–	1–0	0–2	1–0	10–6
UNC Asheville	1–0	2–0	1–1	2–0	0–1	1–0	1–0	1–1	0–1	–	0–1	1–1	10–6
VMI	1–1	1–0	0–1	1–0	1–1	1–1	2–0	1–0	2–0	1–0	–	0–1	11–5
Winthrop	1–0	1–1	2–0	0–2	0–1	1–0	1–0	2–0	0–1	1–1	1–0	–	10–6

=== Campbell ===
Date time, TV	Opponent	Result	Record	Site (attendance) city, state
Big South Regular season
01/08/2013; 7:00 pm	High Point	W 74–71	7–9 (1–0)	Gore Arena (2,160); Buies Creek, North Carolina
01/11/2014; 5:00 pm	at Longwood	W 75–67	8–9 (2–0)	Willett Hall (632); Farmville, Virginia
01/14/2014; 7:00 pm	at Liberty	L 68–71	8–10 (2–1)	Vines Center (1,942); Lynchburg, Virginia
01/18/2014; 2:00 pm	VMI	W 97–93 ^{OT}	9–10 (3–1)	Gore Arena (N/A); Buies Creek, North Carolina
01/22/2014; 7:00 pm	Radford	W 65–63	10–10 (4–1)	Gore Arena (1,847); Buies Creek, North Carolina
01/25/2014; 7:00 pm	at Gardner–Webb	L 48–66	10–11 (4–2)	Paul Porter Arena (2,230); Boiling Springs, North Carolina
01/29/2014; 7:00 pm	Charleston Southern	W 65–57	11–11 (5–2)	Gore Arena (2,012); Buies Creek, North Carolina
02/01/2014; 4:00 pm, ESPNU	Coastal Carolina	L 58–61	11–12 (5–3)	Gore Arena (3,220); Buies Creek, North Carolina
02/05/2014; 7:00 pm	at UNC Asheville	L 73–86	11–13 (5–4)	Kimmel Arena (1,657); Asheville, North Carolina
02/08/2014; 4:00 pm	at Winthrop	L 62–88	11–14 (5–5)	Winthrop Coliseum (2,569); Rock Hill, South Carolina
02/12/2014; 7:00 pm	Presbyterian	W 77–66	12–14 (6–5)	Gore Arena (1,249); Buies Creek, North Carolina
02/15/2014; 7:00 pm	Longwood	L 53–76	12–15 (6–6)	Gore Arena (1,930); Buies Creek, North Carolina
02/19/2013; 7:00 pm	at VMI	L 81–84	12–16 (6–7)	Cameron Hall (2,371); Lexington, Virginia
02/22/2014; 7:00 pm	Liberty	L 59–79	12–17 (6–8)	Gore Arena (2,440); Buies Creek, North Carolina
02/26/2014; 7:00 pm	at Radford	L 78–82	12–18 (6–9)	Dedmon Center (1,672); Radford, Virginia
02/28/2014; 7:00 pm, ESPNU	at High Point	L 53–56	12–19 (6–10)	Millis Center (1,851); High Point, North Carolina
2014 Big South tournament
03/05/2014; 6:00 pm	vs. Charleston Southern; First round	L 71–81	12–20	HTC Center (1,648); Conway, South Carolina
*Non-conference game. ^{#}Rankings from AP Poll. (#) Tournament seedings in parentheses. All times are in Eastern Time.

=== Charleston Southern ===
Date time, TV	Opponent	Result	Record	Site (attendance) city, state
Big South Regular season
01/08/2014; 7:30 pm	Coastal Carolina	W 70–58	7–7 (1–0)	CSU Field House (912); Charleston, South Carolina
01/11/2014; 2:00 pm	at Winthrop	L 68–85	7–8 (1–1)	Winthrop Coliseum (1,327); Rock Hill, South Carolina
01/15/2014; 7:30 pm	Presbyterian	W 95–58	8–8 (2–1)	CSU Field House (858); Charleston, South Carolina
01/18/2014; 5:30 pm	UNC Asheville	L 76–80	8–9 (2–2)	CSU Field House (922); Charleston, South Carolina
01/22/2014; 7:00 pm	at Gardner–Webb	W 78–76	9–9 (3–2)	Paul Porter Arena (1,450); Boiling Springs, North Carolina
01/25/2014; 5:30 pm	Longwood	L 85–88	9–10 (3–3)	CSU Field House (794); Charleston, South Carolina
01/29/2014; 7:00 pm	at Campbell	L 57–65	9–11 (3–4)	John W. Pope, Jr. Convocation Center (2,012); Buies Creek, North Carolina
02/01/2014; 5:30 pm	Liberty	W 80–66	10–11 (4–4)	CSU Field House (840); Charleston, South Carolina
02/05/2014; 7:30 pm	Radford	L 76–82	10–12 (4–5)	CSU Field House (898); Charleston, South Carolina
02/08/2014; 1:00 pm	at VMI	L 84–92	10–13 (4–6)	Cameron Hall (3,627); Lexington, Virginia
02/15/2014; 5:30 pm	Winthrop	W 84–64	11–13 (5–6)	CSU Field House (789); Charleston, South Carolina
02/17/2014; 7:00 pm	at High Point; Postponed from 2/13	L 70–76	11–14 (5–7)	Millis Center (875); High Point, North Carolina
02/19/2014; 7:00 pm	at UNC Asheville	L 71–82	11–15 (5–8)	Kimmel Arena (1,737); Asheville, North Carolina
02/22/2014; 7:00 pm	at Presbyterian	W 86–47	12–15 (6–8)	Templeton Physical Education Center (1,053); Clinton, South Carolina
02/26/2014; 7:30 pm	Gardner–Webb	L 76–78	12–16 (6–9)	CSU Field House (N/A); Charleston, South Carolina
03/01/2014; 2:00 pm	at Coastal Carolina	L 61–63	12–17 (6–10)	HTC Center (2,939); Conway, South Carolina
2014 Big South tournament
03/05/2014; 6:00 pm	vs. Campbell; First round	W 81–71	13–17	HTC Center (1,648); Conway, South Carolina
03/06/2014; 6:00 pm, ESPN3	at Coastal Carolina; Quarterfinals	L 68–73 ^{2OT}	13–18	HTC Center (3,176); Conway, South Carolina
*Non-conference game. ^{#}Rankings from AP Poll. (#) Tournament seedings in parentheses. All times are in Eastern Time.

=== Coastal Carolina ===
Date time, TV	Rank^{#}	Opponent^{#}	Result	Record	Site (attendance) city, state
Big South Regular season
01/08/2014; 7:30 pm		at Charleston Southern	L 58–70	7–8 (0–1)	CSU Field House (912); Charleston, South Carolina
01/11/2014; 7:00 pm		at Gardner–Webb	W 81–69	8–8 (1–1)	Paul Porter Arena (1,982); Boiling Springs, North Carolina
01/15/2014; 7:00 pm		UNC Asheville	W 81–78	9–8 (2–1)	HTC Center (2,879); Conway, South Carolina
01/18/2014; 7:00 pm		Winthrop	L 72–73 ^{OT}	9–9 (2–2)	HTC Center (3,179); Conway, South Carolina
01/22/2014; 7:00 pm		at Presbyterian	W 84–72	10–9 (3–2)	Templeton Physical Education Center (1,097); Clinton, South Carolina
01/25/2014; 2:00 pm		at Radford	W 69–61	11–9 (4–2)	Dedmon Center (2,349); Radford, Virginia
01/29/2014; 7:00 pm		Liberty	W 66–64	12–9 (5–2)	HTC Center (2,471); Conway, South Carolina
02/01/2014; 4:00 pm, ESPNU		at Campbell	W 61–58	13–9 (6–2)	John W. Pope, Jr. Convocation Center (3,220); Buies Creek, North Carolina
02/05/2014; 7:00 pm, ESPN3		High Point	L 74–77	13–10 (6–3)	HTC Center (2,639); Conway, South Carolina
02/08/2014; 2:00 pm		Longwood	W 67–58	14–10 (7–3)	HTC Center (2,006); Conway, South Carolina
02/12/2014; 7:00 pm		at VMI	W 83–78	15–10 (8–3)	Cameron Hall (970); Lexington, Virginia
02/15/2014; 7:00 pm		Gardner–Webb	W 75–60	16–10 (9–3)	HTC Center (2,123); Conway, South Carolina
02/19/2014; 7:00 pm		at Winthrop	L 65–75	16–11 (9–4)	Winthrop Coliseum (1,762); Rock Hill, South Carolina
02/22/2014; 2:00 pm		at UNC Asheville	L 85–100	16–12 (9–5)	Kimmel Arena (1,789); Asheville, North Carolina
02/26/2014; 7:00 pm		Presbyterian	W 70–51	17–12 (10–5)	HTC Center (2,217); Conway, South Carolina
03/01/2014; 2:00 pm		Charleston Southern	W 63–61	18–12 (11–5)	HTC Center (2,939); Conway, South Carolina
Big South tournament
03/07/2014; 6:00 pm, ESPN3		Charleston Southern; Quarterfinals	W 73–68 ^{2OT}	19–12	HTC Center (3,176); Conway, South Carolina
03/08/2014; 2:30 pm, ESPN3		VMI; Semifinals	W 66–62	20–12	HTC Center (2,892); Conway, South Carolina
03/09/2014; 12:00 pm, ESPN2		Winthrop; Championship	W 76–61	21–12	HTC Center (3,072); Conway, South Carolina
NCAA tournament
03/21/2014*; 9:25 pm, TBS	No. (16 E)	vs. No. 3 (1 E) Virginia; Second round	L 59–70	21–13	PNC Arena (17,472); Raleigh, North Carolina
*Non-conference game. ^{#}Rankings from AP Poll, (#) during NCAA Tournament is seed within region E=East. (#) Tournament seedings in parentheses. All times are in Eastern Time.

=== Gardner–Webb ===
Date time, TV	Opponent	Result	Record	Site (attendance) city, state
Big South Regular season
01/08/2014; 7:00 pm	UNC Asheville	L 77–81	7–9 (0–1)	Paul Porter Arena (1,950); Boiling Springs, North Carolina
01/11/2014; 7:00 pm	Coastal Carolina	L 69–81	7–10 (0–2)	Paul Porter Arena (1,982); Boiling Springs, North Carolina
01/15/2014; 2:00 pm	at Winthrop	W 56–51	8–10 (1–2)	Winthrop Coliseum (1,955); Rock Hill, South Carolina
01/18/2014; 7:00 pm	at Presbyterian	W 67–58	9–10 (2–2)	Templeton Physical Education Center (810); Clinton, South Carolina
01/22/2014; 7:00 pm	Charleston Southern	L 76–78	9–11 (2–3)	Paul Porter Arena (1,450); Boiling Springs, North Carolina
01/25/2014; 7:00 pm	Campbell	W 66–48	10–11 (3–3)	Paul Porter Arena (2,230); Boiling Springs, North Carolina
01/29/2014; 7:00 pm	at Longwood	W 82–62	11–11 (4–3)	Willett Hall (1,207); Farmville, Virginia
02/01/2014; 4:00 pm	at Radford	W 73–72 ^{OT}	12–11 (5–3)	Dedmon Center (1,941); Radford, Virginia
02/05/2014; 7:00 pm	VMI	L 104–108 ^{4OT}	12–12 (5–4)	Paul Porter Arena (1,450); Boiling Springs, North Carolina
02/08/2014; 7:00 pm	High Point	W 80–76	13–12 (6–4)	Paul Porter Arena (2,090); Boiling Springs, North Carolina
02/11/2014; 7:00 pm	at Liberty	W 68–52	14–12 (7–4)	Vines Center (1,645); Lynchburg, Virginia
02/15/2014; 7:00 pm	at Coastal Carolina	L 60–75	14–13 (7–5)	HTC Center (2,123); Conway, South Carolina
02/19/2014; 7:00 pm	Presbyterian	W 79–70	15–13 (8–5)	Paul Porter Arena (1,104); Boiling Springs, North Carolina
02/22/2014; 7:00 pm	Winthrop	W 85–79 ^{OT}	16–13 (9–5)	Paul Porter Arena (1,898); Boiling Springs, North Carolina
02/26/2014; 7:30 pm	at Charleston Southern	W 78–76	17–13 (10–5)	CSU Field House (N/A); Charleston, South Carolina
03/01/2014; 4:30 pm	at UNC Asheville	L 71–83	17–14 (10–6)	Kimmel Arena (2,756); Asheville, North Carolina
2014 Big South tournament
03/05/2014; 8:00 pm	vs. Longwood; First round	W 81–65	18–14	HTC Center (1,648); Conway, South Carolina
03/07/2014; 8:00 pm	vs. VMI; Quarterfinals	L 77–90	18–15	HTC Center (3,176); Conway, South Carolina
*Non-conference game. ^{#}Rankings from AP Poll. (#) Tournament seedings in parentheses. All times are in Eastern Time.

=== High Point ===
Date time, TV	Rank^{#}	Opponent^{#}	Result	Record	Site (attendance) city, state
Big South Regular Season
01/08/2014; 7:00 pm		at Campbell	L 71–74	4–10 (0–1)	John W. Pope, Jr. Convocation Center (2,160); Buies Creek, North Carolina
01/10/2014; 7:00 pm, ESPNU		Radford	L 72–81	4–11 (0–2)	Millis Center (1,573); High Point, North Carolina
01/15/2014; 7:00 pm		Longwood	W 83–75	5–11 (1–2)	Millis Center (1,004); High Point, North Carolina
01/18/2014; 7:00 pm, MASN/ESPN3		at Liberty	W 76–70	6–11 (2–2)	Vines Center (5,271); Lynchburg, Virginia
01/22/2014; 7:00 pm		at VMI	L 80–82 ^{OT}	6–12 (2–3)	Cameron Hall (1,432); Lexington, Virginia
01/25/2014; 7:00 pm		UNC Asheville	W 78–67	7–12 (3–3)	Millis Center (1,412); High Point, North Carolina
01/28/2014; 7:00 pm		at Presbyterian	W 81–74	8–12 (4–3)	Templeton Physical Education Center (603); Clinton, South Carolina
02/01/2014; 7:00 pm		Winthrop	W 65–64	9–12 (5–3)	Millis Center (1,780); High Point, North Carolina
02/05/2014; 7:00 pm, ESPN3		at Coastal Carolina	W 77–74	10–12 (6–3)	HTC Center (2,639); Conway, South Carolina
02/08/2014; 7:00 pm		at Gardner–Webb	L 76–80	10–13 (6–4)	Paul Porter Arena (2,090); Boiling Springs, North Carolina
02/15/2014; 4:00 pm		at Radford	W 72–65	11–13 (7–4)	Dedmon Center (1,669); Radford, Virginia
02/17/2014; 7:00 pm		Charleston Southern; Postponed from 2/13	W 76–70	12–13 (8–4)	Millis Center (875); High Point, North Carolina
02/19/2014; 7:00 pm		Liberty	W 67–60	13–13 (9–4)	Millis Center (942); High Point, North Carolina
02/22/2014; 5:00 pm		at Longwood	W 85–59	14–13 (10–4)	Willett Hall (1,372); Farmville, Virginia
02/26/2014; 7:00 pm		VMI	W 70–67	15–13 (11–4)	Millis Center (1,241); High Point, North Carolina
02/28/2014; 7:00 pm, ESPNU		Campbell	W 56–53	16–13 (12–4)	Millis Center (1,851); High Point, North Carolina
Big South tournament
03/07/2014; 12:00 pm, ESPN3		vs. Winthrop; Quarterfinals	L 60–62	16–14	HTC Center (1,921); Conway, South Carolina
*Non-conference game. ^{#}Rankings from AP Poll, (#) during NIT is seed within region. (#) Tournament seedings in parentheses. All times are in Eastern Time.

=== Liberty ===
Date time, TV	Opponent	Result	Record	Site (attendance) city, state
Big South Regular season
1/8/2014; 7:00 pm	at Radford	L 63–72	6–10 (0–1)	Dedmon Center (N/A); Radford, Virginia
1/11/2014; 1:00 pm	at VMI	W 85–80	7–10 (1–1)	Cameron Hall (1,567); Lexington, Virginia
1/14/2014; 7:00 pm	Campbell	W 71–68	8–10 (2–1)	Vines Center (1,942); Lynchburg, Virginia
1/18/2014; 7:00 pm, MASN/ESPN3	High Point	L 70–76	8–11 (2–2)	Vines Center (5,271); Lynchburg, Virginia
1/22/2014; 7:00 pm	at Longwood	L 66–69	8–12 (2–3)	Willett Hall (1,619); Farmville, Virginia
1/25/2014; 7:00 pm	Presbyterian	W 65–53	9–12 (3–3)	Vines Center (2,624); Lynchburg, Virginia
1/29/2014; 7:00 pm	at Coastal Carolina	L 64–66	9–13 (3–4)	HTC Center (2,471); Conway, South Carolina
2/1/2014; 5:30 pm, ESPN3	at Charleston Southern	L 66–80	9–14 (3–5)	CSU Field House (840); North Charleston, South Carolina
2/4/2014; 7:00 pm	Winthrop	L 62–73	9–15 (3–6)	Vines Center (1,615); Lynchburg, Virginia
2/8/2014; 2:00 pm	at UNC Asheville	L 72–75	9–16 (3–7)	Kimmel Arena (2,456); Asheville, North Carolina
2/11/2014; 7:00 pm	Gardner–Webb	L 52–68	9–17 (3–8)	Vines Center (1,645); Lynchburg, Virginia
2/15/2014; 7:00 pm	VMI	L 70–77	9–18 (3–9)	Vines Center (2,595); Lynchburg, Virginia
2/19/2014; 7:00 pm	at High Point	L 60–67	9–19 (3–10)	Millis Athletic Convocation Center (942); High Point, North Carolina
2/22/2014; 4:00 pm, ESPN3	at Campbell	W 79–59	10–19 (4–10)	John W. Pope, Jr. Convocation Center (2,440); Buies Creek, North Carolina
2/25/2014; 7:00 pm	Longwood	W 90–76	11–19 (5–10)	Vines Center (2,072); Lynchburg, Virginia
3/1/2014; 4:30 pm	Radford	L 83–87	11–20 (5–11)	Vines Center (2,524); Lynchburg, Virginia
2014 Big South tournament
03/5/2014; 12:00 pm	vs. Winthrop; First round	L 65–77	11–21	HTC Center (1,448); Conway, South Carolina
*Non-conference game. ^{#}Rankings from AP Poll. (#) Tournament seedings in parentheses. All times are in Eastern.

=== Longwood ===
Date time, TV	Opponent	Result	Record	Site (attendance) city, state
Big South Regular season
01/08/2014; 7:00 pm	at VMI	L 72–95	5–11 (0–1)	Cameron Hall (653); Lexington, Virginia
01/11/2014; 5:00 pm	Campbell	L 67–75	5–12 (0–2)	Willett Hall (632); Farmville, Virginia
01/15/2014; 7:00 pm	at High Point	L 75–83	5–13 (0–3)	Millis Convocation Center (1,004); High Point, North Carolina
01/18/2014; 4:00 pm	at Radford	L 76–93	5–14 (0–4)	Dedmon Center (1,772); Radford, Virginia
01/22/2014; 7:00 pm	Liberty	W 69–66	6–14 (1–4)	Willett Hall (1,619); Farmville, Virginia
01/25/2014; 5:30 pm	at Charleston Southern	W 88–85	7–14 (2–4)	CSU Field House (794); North Charleston, South Carolina
01/29/2014; 7:00 pm	Gardner–Webb	L 62–82	7–15 (2–5)	Willett Hall (1,207); Farmville, Virginia
02/01/2014; 5:00 pm	UNC Asheville	L 66–67	7–16 (2–6)	Willett Hall (1,757); Farmville, Virginia
02/05/2014; 7:00 pm	at Presbyterian	L 62–77	7–17 (2–7)	Templeton Physical Education Center (498); Clinton, South Carolina
02/08/2014; 2:00 pm	at Coastal Carolina	L 58–67	7–18 (2–8)	HTC Center (2,006); Conway, South Carolina
02/12/2014; 7:00 pm	Winthrop	L 59–76	7–19 (2–9)	Willett Hall (901); Farmville, Virginia
02/15/2014; 7:00 pm	at Campbell	W 76–53	8–19 (3–9)	John W. Pope, Jr. Convocation Center (1,930); Buies Creek, North Carolina
02/19/2014; 7:00 pm	Radford	L 75–86	8–20 (3–10)	Willett Hall (1,419); Farmville, Virginia
02/22/2014; 5:00 pm	High Point	L 59–85	8–21 (3–11)	Willett Hall (1,372); Farmville, Virginia
02/25/2014; 7:00 pm	at Liberty	L 76–90	8–22 (3–12)	Vines Center (2,072); Lynchburg, Virginia
03/01/2014; 4:30 pm	VMI	L 66–86	8–23 (3–13)	Willett Hall (1,221); Farmville, Virginia
2014 Big South tournament
03/05/2014; 8:00 pm	at vs. Gardner–Webb; First round	L 65–81	8–24	HTC Center (1,648); Conway, South Carolina
*Non-conference game. ^{#}Rankings from AP Poll. (#) Tournament seedings in parentheses. All times are in Eastern Time.

=== Presbyterian ===
Date time, TV	Opponent	Result	Record	Site (attendance) city, state
Big South Regular season
01/08/2014; 7:00 pm	Winthrop	L 67–71	4–12 (0–1)	Templeton Center (925); Clinton, South Carolina
01/11/2014; 2:00 pm	at UNC Asheville	L 70–84	4–13 (0–2)	Kimmel Arena (1,615); Asheville, North Carolina
01/15/2014; 7:30 pm	at Charleston Southern	L 58–95	4–14 (0–3)	CSU Field House (858); Charleston, South Carolina
01/22/2014; 2:00 pm	Gardner–Webb	L 58–67	4–15 (0–4)	Templeton Center (810); Clinton, South Carolina
01/25/2014; 7:00 pm	Coastal Carolina	L 72–84	4–16 (0–5)	Templeton Center (1,097); Clinton, South Carolina
01/25/2014; 7:00 pm	at Liberty	L 53–65	4–17 (0–6)	Vines Center (2,624); Lynchburg, Virginia
01/28/2014; 7:00 pm	High Point	L 74–81	4–18 (0–7)	Templeton Center (603); Clinton, South Carolina
01/31/2014; 7:00 pm	at VMI	L 93–107	4–19 (0–8)	Cameron Hall (2,856); Lexington, Virginia
02/05/2014; 7:00 pm	Longwood	W 77–62	5–19 (1–8)	Templeton Center (498); Clinton, South Carolina
02/08/2014; 2:00 pm	Radford	L 66–83	5–20 (1–9)	Templeton Center (653); Clinton, South Carolina
02/12/2014; 7:00 pm	at Campbell	L 66–77	5–21 (1–10)	Gore Arena (1,249); Buies Creek, North Carolina
02/15/2014; 7:45 pm	UNC Asheville	W 72–71	6–21 (2–10)	Templeton Center (956); Clinton, South Carolina
02/19/2014; 7:00 pm	at Gardner–Webb	L 70–79	6–22 (2–11)	Paul Porter Arena; Boiling Springs, North Carolina
02/22/2014; 7:00 pm	Charleston Southern	L 47–86	6–23 (2–12)	Templeton Center (1,053); Clinton, South Carolina
02/26/2014; 7:00 pm	at Coastal Carolina	L 51–70	6–24 (2–13)	HTC Center (2,217); Conway, South Carolina
03/01/2014; 4:00 pm	at Wintrhop	L 60–82	6–25 (2–14)	Winthrop Coliseum (1,696); Rock Hill, South Carolina
2014 Big South tournament
03/05/2014; 2:00 pm	vs. Radford; First round	L 73–78	6–26	HTC Center (1,448); Conway, South Carolina
*Non-conference game. ^{#}Rankings from AP Poll. (#) Tournament seedings in parentheses. All times are in Eastern Time.

=== Radford ===
Date time, TV	Opponent	Result	Record	Site (attendance) city, state
Big South Regular season
01/08/2014; 7:00 pm	Liberty	W 72–63	11–5 (1–0)	Dedmon Center (N/A); Radford, Virginia
01/10/2014; 7:00 pm	at High Point	W 81–72	12–5 (2–0)	Millis Center (1,573); High Point, North Carolina
01/15/2014; 7:00 pm	VMI	L 88–101	12–6 (2–1)	Dedmon Center (2,058); Radford, Virginia
01/18/2014; 4:00 pm	Longwood	W 93–76	13–6 (3–1)	Dedmon Center (1,772); Radford, Virginia
01/22/2014; 7:00 pm	at Campbell	L 63–65	13–7 (3–2)	John W. Pope, Jr. Convocation Center (1,847); Buies Creek, North Carolina
01/25/2014; 2:00 pm	Coastal Carolina	L 61–69	13–8 (3–3)	Dedmon Center (2,349); Radford, Virginia
01/29/2014; 7:00 pm	at Winthrop	W 76–64	14–8 (4–3)	Winthrop Coliseum (1,223); Rock Hill, South Carolina
02/01/2014; 4:00 pm	Gardner–Webb	L 72–73 ^{OT}	14–9 (4–4)	Dedmon Center (1,941); Radford, Virginia
02/05/2014; 7:30 pm	at Charleston Southern	W 82–76	15–9 (5–4)	CSU Field House (898); Charleston, South Carolina
02/08/2014; 2:00 pm	at Presbyterian	W 83–66	16–9 (6–4)	Templeton Physical Education Center (653); Clinton, South Carolina
02/12/2014; 7:00 pm	UNC Asheville	W 102–92	17–9 (7–4)	Dedmon Center (1,573); Radford, Virginia
02/15/2014; 4:00 pm	High Point	L 65–72	17–10 (7–5)	Dedmon Center (1,669); Radford, Virginia
02/19/2014; 7:00 pm	at Longwood	W 86–75	18–10 (8–5)	Willett Hall (1,419); Farmville, Virginia
02/22/2014; 1:00 pm	at VMI	L 76–88	18–11 (8–6)	Cameron Hall (3,314); Lexington, Virginia
02/26/2014; 7:00 pm	Campbell	W 82–78	19–11 (9–6)	Dedmon Center (1,672); Radford, Virginia
03/01/2014; 7:00 pm	at Liberty	W 87–83	20–11 (10–6)	Vines Center (2,524); Lynchburg, Virginia
Big South tournament
03/05/2014; 2:00 pm	vs. Presbyterian; First round	W 78–73	21–11	HTC Center (1,448); Conway, South Carolina
03/07/2014; 2:00 pm, ESPN3	vs. UNC Asheville; Quarterfinals	L 87–96	21–12	HTC Center (1,921); Conway, South Carolina
*Non-conference game. ^{#}Rankings from AP Poll. (#) Tournament seedings in parentheses. All times are in Eastern Time.

=== UNC Asheville ===
Date time, TV	Opponent	Result	Record	Site (attendance) city, state
Big South Regular season
01/08/2014; 7:00 pm	at Gardner–Webb	W 81–77	7–8 (1–0)	Paul Porter Arena (1,950); Boiling Springs, North Carolina
01/11/2014; 2:00 pm	Presbyterian	W 84–70	8–8 (2–0)	Kimmel Arena (1,615); Asheville, North Carolina
01/15/2014; 7:00 pm	at Coastal Carolina	L 78–81	8–9 (2–1)	HTC Center (2,879); Conway, South Carolina
01/18/2014; 2:00 pm	at Charleston Southern	W 80–76	9–9 (3–1)	CSU Field House (922); Charleston, South Carolina
01/22/2014; 7:00 pm	Winthrop	W 81–66	10–9 (4–1)	Kimmel Arena (1,741); Asheville, North Carolina
01/25/2014; 7:00 pm	at High Point	L 67–78	10–10 (4–2)	Millis Center (1,412); High Point, North Carolina
01/28/2014; 7:00 pm	VMI	L 105–109	10–11 (4–3)	Kimmel Arena (959); Asheville, North Carolina
02/01/2014; 5:00 pm	at Longwood	W 67–66	11–11 (5–3)	Willett Hall (1,757); Farmville, Virginia
02/05/2014; 7:00 pm	Campbell	W 86–73	12–11 (6–3)	Kimmel Arena (1,657); Asheville, North Carolina
02/08/2014; 2:00 pm	Liberty	W 75–72	13–11 (7–3)	Kimmel Arena (2,456); Asheville, North Carolina
02/12/2014; 7:00 pm	at Radford	L 92–102	13–12 (7–4)	Dedmon Center (1,573); Radford, Virginia
02/15/2014; 7:45 pm	at Presbyterian	L 71–72	13–13 (7–5)	Templeton Physical Education Center (956); Clinton, South Carolina
02/19/2014; 7:00 pm	Charleston Southern	W 82–71	14–13 (8–5)	Kimmel Arena (1,737); Asheville, North Carolina
02/22/2014; 2:00 pm	Coastal Carolina	W 100–85	15–13 (9–5)	Kimmel Arena (1,789); Asheville, North Carolina
02/26/2014; 7:00 pm	at Winthrop	L 100–107 ^{OT}	15–14 (9–6)	Winthrop Coliseum (1,359); Rock Hill, South Carolina
03/01/2014; 4:30 pm	Gardner–Webb	W 83–71	16–14 (10–6)	Kimmel Arena (2,756); Asheville, North Carolina
Big South tournament
03/07/2014; 2:00 pm, ESPN3	vs. Radford; Quarterfinals	W 96–87	17–14	HTC Center (1,921); Conway, South Carolina
03/08/2014; 12:00 pm, ESPN3	vs. Winthrop; Semifinals	L 79–80	17–15	HTC Center (2,892); Conway, South Carolina
*Non-conference game. ^{#}Rankings from AP Poll. (#) Tournament seedings in parentheses. All times are in Eastern Time.

=== VMI ===
Date time, TV	Opponent	Result	Record	Site (attendance) city, state
Big South Regular season
January 8; 7:00 pm	Longwood	W 95–72	8–6 (1–0)	Cameron Hall (653); Lexington, Virginia
January 11; 1:00 pm	Liberty	L 80–85	8–7 (1–1)	Cameron Hall (1,567); Lexington, Virginia
January 15; 7:00 pm	at Radford	W 101–88	9–7 (2–1)	Dedmon Center (2,058); Radford, Virginia
January 18; 2:00 pm	at Campbell	L 93–97 ^{OT}	9–8 (2–2)	John W. Pope, Jr. Convocation Center (2,498); Buies Creek, North Carolina
January 22; 7:00 pm	High Point	W 82–80 ^{OT}	10–8 (3–2)	Cameron Hall (1,432); Lexington, Virginia
January 25; 4:00 pm, ESPN3	at Winthrop	L 57–58	10–9 (3–3)	Winthrop Coliseum (1,589); Rock Hill, South Carolina
January 28; 7:00 pm	at UNC Asheville	W 109–105	11–9 (4–3)	Kimmel Arena (959); Asheville, North Carolina
January 31; 7:00 pm	Presbyterian	W 107–93	12–9 (5–3)	Cameron Hall (2,856); Lexington, Virginia
February 5; 7:00 pm	at Gardner–Webb	W 108–104 ^{4OT}	13–9 (6–3)	Paul Porter Arena (1,450); Boiling Springs, North Carolina
February 8; 1:00 pm	Charleston Southern	W 92–84	14–9 (7–3)	Cameron Hall (3,627); Lexington, Virginia
February 12; 7:00 pm	Coastal Carolina	L 78–83	14–10 (7–4)	Cameron Hall (970); Lexington, Virginia
February 15; 7:00 pm, MASN	at Liberty	W 77–70	15–10 (8–4)	Vines Center (2,595); Lynchburg, Virginia
February 19; 7:00 pm	Campbell	W 84–81	16–10 (9–4)	Cameron Hall (2,371); Lexington, Virginia
February 22; 1:00 pm	Radford	W 88–76	17–10 (10–4)	Cameron Hall (3,314); Lexington, Virginia
February 26; 7:00 pm	at High Point	L 67–70	17–11 (10–5)	Millis Athletic Convocation Center (1,241); High Point, North Carolina
March 1; 4:30 pm	at Longwood	W 86–66	18–11 (11–5)	Willett Hall (1,221); Farmville, Virginia
Big South tournament
March 7; 8:00 pm, ESPN3	vs. Gardner–Webb; Quarterfinals	W 90–77	19–11	HTC Center (3,176); Conway, South Carolina
March 8; 2:00 pm, ESPN3	at Coastal Carolina; Semifinals	L 62–66	19–12	HTC Center (2,892); Conway, South Carolina
*Non-conference game. (#) Tournament seedings in parentheses. All times are in Eastern Time.

=== Winthrop ===
Date time, TV	Opponent	Result	Record	Site (attendance) city, state
Big South Regular season
01/08/2014; 7:00 pm	at Presbyterian	W 71–67	7–6 (1–0)	Templeton Physical Education Center (925); Clinton, South Carolina
01/11/2014; 2:00 pm	Charleston Southern	W 85–68	8–6 (2–0)	Winthrop Coliseum (1,327); Rock Hill, South Carolina
01/15/2014; 7:00 pm	Gardner–Webb	L 51–56	8–7 (2–1)	Winthrop Coliseum (1,955); Rock Hill, South Carolina
01/18/2014; 7:00 pm	at Coastal Carolina	W 73–72 ^{OT}	9–7 (3–1)	HTC Center (3,179); Conway, South Carolina
01/22/2014; 7:00 pm	at UNC Asheville	L 66–81	9–8 (3–2)	Kimmel Arena (1,741); Asheville, North Carolina
01/25/2014; 4:00 pm	VMI	W 58–57	10–8 (4–2)	Winthrop Coliseum (1,589); Rock Hill, South Carolina
01/29/2014; 7:00 pm	Radford	L 64–76	10–9 (4–3)	Winthrop Coliseum (1,223); Rock Hill, South Carolina
02/01/2014; 7:00 pm	at High Point	L 64–65	10–10 (4–4)	Millis Center (1,780); High Point, North Carolina
02/04/2014; 7:00 pm	at Liberty	W 73–62	11–10 (5–4)	Vines Center (1,615); Lynchburg, Virginia
02/06/2014*; 4:00 pm	Barber–Scotia; Makeup from 1/04	W 92–62	12–10	Winthrop Coliseum (710); Rock Hill, South Carolina
02/08/2014; 4:00 pm	Campbell	W 88–62	13–10 (6–4)	Winthrop Coliseum (2,569); Rock Hill, South Carolina
02/12/2014; 7:00 pm	at Longwood	W 76–59	14–10 (7–4)	Willett Hall (901); Farmville, Virginia
02/15/2014; 5:30 pm	at Charleston Southern	L 64–84	14–11 (7–5)	CSU Field House (789); Charleston, South Carolina
02/19/2014; 7:00 pm	Coastal Carolina	W 75–65	15–11 (8–5)	Winthrop Coliseum (1,762); Rock Hill, South Carolina
02/22/2014; 7:00 pm	at Gardner–Webb	L 79–85 ^{OT}	15–12 (8–6)	Paul Porter Arena (1,898); Boiling Springs, North Carolina
02/26/2014; 7:00 pm	UNC Asheville	W 107–100 ^{OT}	16–12 (9–6)	Winthrop Coliseum (1,359); Rock Hill, South Carolina
03/01/2014; 4:00 pm	Presbyterian	W 82–60	17–12 (10–6)	Winthrop Coliseum (1,696); Rock Hill, South Carolina
2014 Big South tournament
03/05/2014; 12:00 pm	vs. Liberty; First round	W 77–65	18–12	HTC Center (1,448); Conway, South Carolina
03/07/2014; 12:00 pm, ESPN3	vs. High Point; Quarterfinals	W 62–60	19–12	HTC Center (1,921); Conway, South Carolina
03/08/2014; 12:00 pm, ESPN3	vs. UNC Asheville; Semifinals	W 80–79	20–12	HTC Center (2,892); Conway, South Carolina
03/09/2014; 12:00 pm, ESPN2	vs. Coastal Carolina; Championship	L 61–76	20–13	HTC Center (3,072); Conway, South Carolina
*Non-conference game. ^{#}Rankings from AP Poll. (#) Tournament seedings in parentheses. All times are in Eastern Time.

== Postseason ==
=== Big South tournament ===
2014 Big South Men's Basketball Tournament Seeds and Results
North Division
Seed	School	Conference	Overall	Tiebreaker	First round March 5	Quarterfinals March 7	Semifinals March 8	Championship March 9
1	High Point ‡	12–4	16–13		Bye	#4S Winthrop		
2	VMI	11–5	18–11		Bye	#3S Gardner–Webb	#1S Coastal Carolina	
3	Radford	10–6	20–11		#6S Presbyterian	#2S UNC Asheville		
4	Campbell	6–10	12–19		#5S Charl. Southern			
5	Liberty	5–11	11–20		#4S Winthrop			
6	Longwood	3–13	8–23		#3S Gardner–Webb			
South Division
Seed	School	Conference	Overall	Tiebreaker	First round March 5	Quarterfinals March 7	Semifinals March 8	Championship March 9
1	Coastal Carolina ‡	11–5	18–12		Bye	#5S Charl. Southern	#2N VMI	#4S Winthrop
2	UNC Asheville	10–6	16–14	3–1 vs. GWU & Winthrop	Bye	#3N Radford	#4S Winthrop	
3	Gardner–Webb	10–6	17–14	2–0 vs. Winthrop	#6N Longwood	#2N VMI		
4	Winthrop	10–6	17–12		#5N Liberty	#1N High Point	#3S UNC Asheville	#1S Coastal Carolina
5	Charleston Southern	6–10	12–17		#4N Campbell	#1S Coastal Carolina		
6	Presbyterian	2–14	6–25		#3S Radford			
‡ – Big South regular season division champions. Overall records are as of the end of the regular season.

==== Bracket ====
First round March 5, 2014
4S	Winthrop	77
5N	Liberty	65
3N	Radford	78
6S	Presbyterian	73
4N	Campbell	71
5S	Charleston Southern	81
3S	Gardner–Webb	81
6N	Longwood	65

Quarterfinals; March 7, 2014
1N	High Point	60
4S	Winthrop	62
2S	UNC Asheville	96
3N	Radford	87
1S	Coastal Carolina	73**
5S	Charleston Southern	68
2N	VMI	90
3S	Gardner–Webb	77

Semifinals; March 8, 2014; ESPN3
4S	Winthrop	80
2S	UNC Asheville	79
1S	Coastal Carolina	66
2N	VMI	62

Championship; March 9, 2014; ESPN2
4S	Winthrop	61
1S	Coastal Carolina	76

=== NCAA tournament ===
Seed	Region	School	Second round	Third round	Sweet 16	Elite Eight	Final Four	Championship
16	East	Coastal Carolina	#1 Virginia – March 21, Raleigh – L, 59–70					
		1 bid	0–1 .000	0–0 –	0–0 –	0–0 –	0–0 –	TOTAL: 0–1 .000

=== National Invitation tournament ===
Seed	Bracket	School	First round	Second round	Quarterfinals	Semifinals	Championship
8	Minnesota	High Point	#1 Minnesota – March 18, Minneapolis – L, 81–88				
		1 bid	0–1 .000	0–0 –	0–0 –	0–0 –	TOTAL: 0–1 .000

=== College Basketball Invitational ===
Seed	Bracket	School	First round	Quarterfinals	Semifinals	Championship
		Radford	Oregon State – March 19, Corvallis – W, 96–92	Old Dominion – March 24, Norfolk – L, 59–82		
		1 bid	1–0 1.000	0–1 .000	0–0 –	TOTAL: 1–1 .500

=== CollegeInsider.com tournament ===
Seed	Bracket	School	First round	Second round	Quarterfinals	Semifinals	Championship
		VMI	Canisius – March 18, Buffalo – W, 111–100	IPFW – March 22, Lexington – W, 106–95	Ohio – March 26, Athens – W, 92–90	Yale – April 1, Lexington – L, 62–75	
		1 bid	1–0 1.000	1–0 1.000	1–0 1.000	0–1 .000	TOTAL: 3–1 .750

== Head coaches ==
Kevin McGeehan, Campbell
Barclay Radebaugh, Charleston Southern
Cliff Ellis, Coastal Carolina
Tim Craft, Gardner–Webb
Scott Cherry, High Point
Dale Layer, Liberty

Jasyon Gee, Longwood
Gregg Nibert, Presbyterian
Mike Jones, Radford
Nick McDevitt, UNC Asheville
Duggar Baucom, VMI
Pat Kelsey, Winthrop
