= 2013–14 Winthrop Eagles men's basketball team =

American college basketball season

2013–14 Winthrop Eagles men's basketball
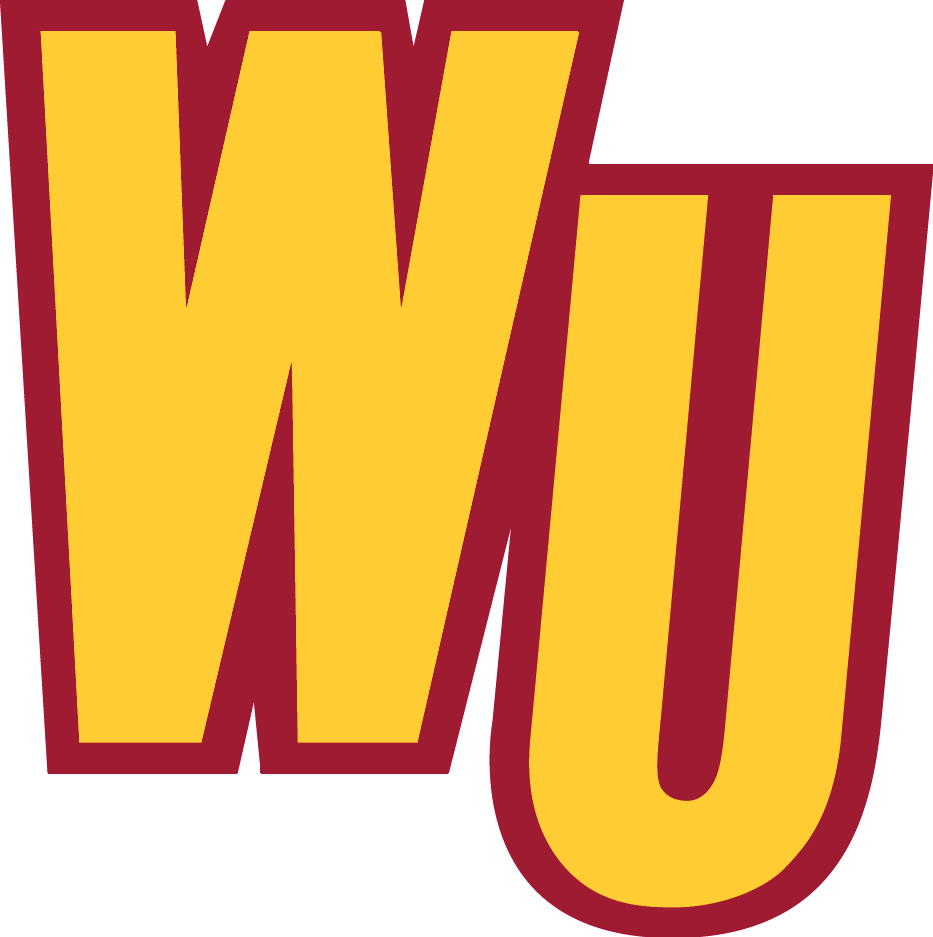
- Conference: Big South Conference
- South Division
- Record: 20–13 (10–6 Big South)
- Head coach: Pat Kelsey (2nd season)
- Assistant coaches: Mark Prosser; Brian Thornton; Marty McGillan
- Home arena: Winthrop Coliseum

2013–14 Big South men's basketball standings
| | Conf. | | | | Overall |
| Team | W | | L | PCT | W | | L | PCT |
|---|---|---|---|---|---|---|---|---|
North
| High Point | 12 | – | 4 | .750 | 16 | – | 15 | .516 |
| VMI | 11 | – | 5 | .688 | 22 | – | 13 | .629 |
| Radford | 10 | – | 6 | .625 | 22 | – | 13 | .629 |
| Campbell | 6 | – | 10 | .375 | 12 | – | 20 | .375 |
| Liberty | 5 | – | 11 | .313 | 11 | – | 21 | .344 |
| Longwood | 3 | – | 13 | .188 | 8 | – | 24 | .250 |
South
| Coastal Carolina † | 11 | – | 5 | .688 | 21 | – | 13 | .618 |
| Winthrop | 10 | – | 6 | .625 | 20 | – | 13 | .606 |
| Gardner–Webb | 10 | – | 6 | .625 | 18 | – | 15 | .545 |
| UNC Asheville | 10 | – | 6 | .625 | 17 | – | 15 | .531 |
| Charleston Southern | 6 | – | 10 | .375 | 13 | – | 18 | .419 |
| Presbyterian | 2 | – | 14 | .125 | 6 | – | 26 | .188 |
† 2014 Big South tournament winner

The 2013–14 Winthrop Eagles men's basketball team represented Winthrop University during the 2013–14 NCAA Division I men's basketball season. The Eagles, led by second year head coach Pat Kelsey, played their home games at the Winthrop Coliseum and were members of the South Division of the Big South Conference. They finished the season 20–13, 10–6 in Big South play to finish in a three way tie for second place in the South Division. They advanced to the championship game of the Big South Conference tournament where they lost to Coastal Carolina. Despite having 20 wins, they did not participate in a postseason tournament.

== Roster ==
| Number | Name | Position | Height | Weight | Year | Hometown |
|---|---|---|---|---|---|---|
| 0 | Duby Okeke | Center | 6–8 | 230 | Freshman | Jonesboro, Georgia |
| 1 | Brandon Vega | Guard | 5–10 | 160 | Junior | Miami, Florida |
| 2 | Carlin Bremner | Guard | 6–0 | 180 | Sophomore | Davidson, North Carolina |
| 3 | Christian Farmer | Guard | 6–5 | 190 | Senior | Charlotte, North Carolina |
| 4 | Joab Jerome | Forward | 6–5 | 197 | Senior | Marietta, Georgia |
| 5 | Keon Johnson | Guard | 5–7 | 160 | Freshman | Mansfield, Ohio |
| 10 | Keon Moore | Guard | 6–5 | 190 | Junior | Windsor, North Carolina |
| 11 | Andre Smith | Guard | 5–10 | 170 | Junior | Tampa, Florida |
| 12 | Ivan Saičić | Forward | 6–7 | 240 | Freshman | Belgrade, Serbia |
| 14 | James Bourne | Forward | 6–8 | 240 | Junior | Alexandria, Virginia |
| 15 | Derrick Henry | Guard | 6–3 | 200 | Junior | Covington, Georgia |
| 20 | Donovan Carter | Forward | 6–5 | 215 | Senior | Ladson, South Carolina |
| 23 | Larry Brown | Forward | 6–6 | 210 | Junior | Red Springs, North Carolina |
| 25 | Josh Davenport | Forward | 6–5 | 200 | Freshman | Cincinnati, Ohio |
| 31 | Tevin Prescott | Forward | 6–5 | 180 | Sophomore | Hartsville, South Carolina |
| 33 | Hunter Sadlon | Guard | 6–0 | 168 | Freshman | Englewood, New Jersey |
| 35 | Jarad Scott | Forward | 6–8 | 215 | Freshman | Lumberton, North Carolina |

== Schedule ==
| Date time, TV | Opponent | Result | Record | Site (attendance) city, state |
Regular season
| 11/09/2013*; 4:00 pm | Roanoke | W 93–74 | 1–0 | Winthrop Coliseum (3,039); Rock Hill, SC |
| 11/13/2013*; 7:00 pm | USC Upstate | W 82–74 | 2–0 | Winthrop Coliseum (1,715); Rock Hill, SC |
| 11/16/2013*; 7:00 pm | at No. 14 VCU | L 71–92 | 2–1 | Verizon Wireless Arena (7,741); Richmond, VA |
| 11/19/2013*; 7:00 pm | at East Tennessee State | W 76–66 | 3–1 | ETSU/MSHA Athletic Center (2,371); Johnson City, TN |
| 11/23/2013*; 4:00 pm | Virginia Intermont | W 96–62 | 4–1 | Winthrop Coliseum (1,343); Rock Hill, SC |
| 11/27/2013*; 7:00 pm | James Madison | W 69–57 | 5–1 | Winthrop Coliseum (1,171); Rock Hill, SC |
| 12/03/2013*; 7:00 pm | at Virginia Tech | L 63–81 | 5–2 | Cassell Coliseum (3,888); Blacksburg, VA |
| 12/15/2013*; 2:00 pm | Appalachian State | W 80–72 | 6–2 | Winthrop Coliseum (1,153); Rock Hill, SC |
| 12/18/2013*; 7:00 pm | at North Carolina Central | L 66–72 | 6–3 | McLendon–McDougald Gymnasium (925); Durham, NC |
| 12/21/2013*; 2:00 pm | Wofford | L 56–62 | 6–4 | Winthrop Coliseum (944); Rock Hill, SC |
| 12/29/2013*; 2:00 pm | at Hampton | L 95–101 ^{2OT} | 6–5 | Hampton Convocation Center (861); Hampton, VA |
| 01/01/2014*; 12:00 pm | at Dayton | L 47–81 | 6–6 | UD Arena (12,041); Dayton, OH |
| 01/04/2014*; 2:00 pm | Barber–Scotia | | | Winthrop Coliseum; Rock Hill, SC |
| 01/08/2014; 7:00 pm | at Presbyterian | W 71–67 | 7–6 (1–0) | Templeton Physical Education Center (925); Clinton, SC |
| 01/11/2014; 2:00 pm | Charleston Southern | W 85–68 | 8–6 (2–0) | Winthrop Coliseum (1,327); Rock Hill, SC |
| 01/15/2014; 7:00 pm | Gardner–Webb | L 51–56 | 8–7 (2–1) | Winthrop Coliseum (1,955); Rock Hill, SC |
| 01/18/2014; 7:00 pm | at Coastal Carolina | W 73–72 ^{OT} | 9–7 (3–1) | HTC Center (3,179); Conway, SC |
| 01/22/2014; 7:00 pm | at UNC Asheville | L 66–81 | 9–8 (3–2) | Kimmel Arena (1,741); Asheville, NC |
| 01/25/2014; 4:00 pm | VMI | W 58–57 | 10–8 (4–2) | Winthrop Coliseum (1,589); Rock Hill, SC |
| 01/29/2014; 7:00 pm | Radford | L 64–76 | 10–9 (4–3) | Winthrop Coliseum (1,223); Rock Hill, SC |
| 02/01/2014; 7:00 pm | at High Point | L 64–65 | 10–10 (4–4) | Millis Center (1,780); High Point, NC |
| 02/04/2014; 7:00 pm | at Liberty | W 73–62 | 11–10 (5–4) | Vines Center (1,615); Lynchburg, VA |
| 02/06/2014*; 4:00 pm | Barber–Scotia; Makeup from 1/04 | W 92–62 | 12–10 | Winthrop Coliseum (710); Rock Hill, SC |
| 02/08/2014; 4:00 pm | Campbell | W 88–62 | 13–10 (6–4) | Winthrop Coliseum (2,569); Rock Hill, SC |
| 02/12/2014; 7:00 pm | at Longwood | W 76–59 | 14–10 (7–4) | Willett Hall (901); Farmville, VA |
| 02/15/2014; 5:30 pm | at Charleston Southern | L 64–84 | 14–11 (7–5) | CSU Field House (789); Charleston, SC |
| 02/19/2014; 7:00 pm | Coastal Carolina | W 75–65 | 15–11 (8–5) | Winthrop Coliseum (1,762); Rock Hill, SC |
| 02/22/2014; 7:00 pm | at Gardner–Webb | L 79–85 ^{OT} | 15–12 (8–6) | Paul Porter Arena (1,898); Boiling Springs, NC |
| 02/26/2014; 7:00 pm | UNC Asheville | W 107–100 ^{OT} | 16–12 (9–6) | Winthrop Coliseum (1,359); Rock Hill, SC |
| 03/01/2014; 4:00 pm | Presbyterian | W 82–60 | 17–12 (10–6) | Winthrop Coliseum (1,696); Rock Hill, SC |
Big South tournament
| 03/05/2014; 12:00 pm | vs. Liberty; First round | W 77–65 | 18–12 | HTC Center (1,448); Conway, SC |
| 03/07/2014; 12:00 pm, ESPN3 | vs. High Point; Quarterfinals | W 62–60 | 19–12 | HTC Center (1,921); Conway, SC |
| 03/08/2014; 12:00 pm, ESPN3 | vs. UNC Asheville; Semifinals | W 80–79 | 20–12 | HTC Center (2,892); Conway, SC |
| 03/09/2014; 12:00 pm, ESPN2 | vs. Coastal Carolina; Championship | L 61–76 | 20–13 | HTC Center (3,072); Conway, SC |
*Non-conference game. ^{#}Rankings from AP Poll. (#) Tournament seedings in parentheses. All times are in Eastern Time.

* The January 4 game vs. Barber-Scotia was postponed after bad weather in the Northeast kept five Barber-Scotia player from returning to school after the Christmas break. With two other player injured, they were not going to have enough players for the game.
