= 2013–14 UNC Asheville Bulldogs men's basketball team =

American college basketball season

2013–14 UNC Asheville Bulldogs men's basketball
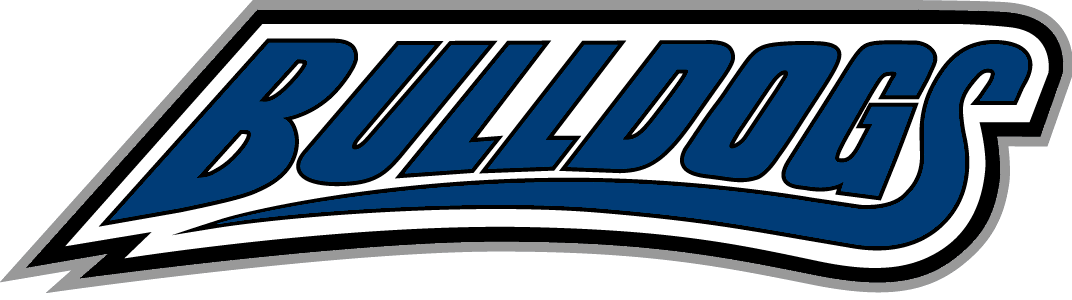
- Conference: Big South Conference
- South Division
- Record: 17–15 (10–6 Big South)
- Head coach: Nick McDevitt (1st season)
- Assistant coaches: Brett Carey; Sean Dixon; Jared Ronai
- Home arena: Kimmel Arena

2013–14 Big South men's basketball standings
	Conf.				Overall
Team	W		L	PCT	W		L	PCT
North
High Point	12	–	4	.750	16	–	15	.516
VMI	11	–	5	.688	22	–	13	.629
Radford	10	–	6	.625	22	–	13	.629
Campbell	6	–	10	.375	12	–	20	.375
Liberty	5	–	11	.313	11	–	21	.344
Longwood	3	–	13	.188	8	–	24	.250
South
Coastal Carolina †	11	–	5	.688	21	–	13	.618
Winthrop	10	–	6	.625	20	–	13	.606
Gardner–Webb	10	–	6	.625	18	–	15	.545
UNC Asheville	10	–	6	.625	17	–	15	.531
Charleston Southern	6	–	10	.375	13	–	18	.419
Presbyterian	2	–	14	.125	6	–	26	.188
† 2014 Big South tournament winner

The 2013–14 UNC Asheville Bulldogs men's basketball team represented the University of North Carolina at Asheville during the 2013–14 NCAA Division I men's basketball season. The Bulldogs, led by first year head coach Nick McDevitt, played their home games at Kimmel Arena and were members of the South Division of the Big South Conference. They finished the season 17–15, 10–6 in Big South play to finish in a three way tie for second place in the South Division. They advanced to the semifinals of the Big South Conference tournament where they lost to Winthrop.

== Roster ==
Number	Name	Position	Height	Weight	Year	Hometown
0	Zack Davis	Guard	6–3	185	Sophomore	Charlotte, North Carolina
3	Ethan Wilmoth	Guard	6–2	195	Freshman	Dobson, North Carolina
5	Jaron Lane	Guard	6–4	185	RS–Senior	Greenville, North Carolina
11	Marcus Neely	Guard	6–4	205	Sophomore	Fort Lauderdale, Florida
13	David Robertson	Guard	6–3	185	Freshman	Cary, North Carolina
14	Mike Bedulskis	Forward	6–9	220	RS–Freshman	Vilnius, Lithuania
15	Andrew Rowsey	Guard	5–10	175	Freshman	Lexington, Virginia
20	Chaudier Pal	Center	6–9	240	Junior	Rockingham, Western Australia
21	Giacomo Zilli	Forward	6–9	225	Freshman	Udine, Italy
22	Corey Littlejohn	Guard	6–3	180	Junior	Columbia, South Carolina
25	Jacob Casper	Guard	6–3	190	Freshman	Asheville, North Carolina
31	Sam Hughes	Forward	6–4	205	Sophomore	Battleboro, North Carolina
32	Will Weeks	Forward	6–6	220	Sophomore	Charlotte, North Carolina
33	D.J. Cunningham	Center	6–10	240	RS–Senior	Waterford, Ohio
42	Alex Biggerstaff	Forward	6–4	185	RS–Freshman	Burnsville, North Carolina
45	Jaleel Roberts	Center	7–0	225	Junior	Evans, Georgia
55	Trent Meyer	Guard	6–3	170	Senior	Fort Lauderdale, Florida

== Schedule ==
Date time, TV	Opponent	Result	Record	Site (attendance) city, state
Exhibition
11/04/2013*; 7:00 pm	Brevard	W 86–45		Kimmel Arena (1,658); Asheville, NC
Regular season
11/08/2013*; 7:00 pm, FS South	at No. 1 Kentucky	L 57–89	0–1	Rupp Arena (22,413); Lexington, KY
11/11/2013*; 7:00 pm	at Western Carolina	L 67–74	0–2	Ramsey Center (1,957); Cullowhee, NC
11/15/2013*; 7:30 pm	at College of Charleston	W 67–58 ^{OT}	1–2	TD Arena (4,120); Charleston, SC
11/18/2013*; 7:00 pm, ESPNU	at No. 4 Duke; NIT Season Tip-Off	L 55–91	1–3	Cameron Indoor Stadium (9,314); Durham, NC
11/19/2013*; 8:30 pm	vs. Norfolk State; NIT Season Tip-Off	L 78–80	1–4	Cameron Indoor Stadium (9,314); Durham, NC
11/25/2013*; 7:30 pm	at Maine; NIT Season Tip-Off	L 56–73	1–5	Ryan Center (869); Kingston, RI
11/26/2013*; 5:00 pm	vs. East Carolina; NIT Season Tip-Off	L 70–81	1–6	Ryan Center (858); Kingston, RI
12/01/2013*; 6:00 pm	at Charlotte	L 56–77	1–7	Dale F. Halton Arena (4,017); Charlotte, NC
12/12/2013*; 7:00 pm	Bluefield	W 92–56	2–7	Kimmel Arena (1,761); Asheville, NC
12/15/2013*; 3:00 pm	at USC Upstate	W 73–63	3–7	Hodge Center (513); Spartanburg, SC
12/20/2013*; 7:00 pm	Virginia Intermont	W 83–58	4–7	Kimmel Arena (1,225); Asheville, NC
12/28/2013*; 4:30 pm	UNC Wilmington	W 75–61	5–7	Kimmel Arena (2,134); Asheville, NC
12/31/2013*; 2:00 pm	Montreat	W 80–41	6–7	Kimmel Arena (1,123); Asheville, NC
01/04/2014*; 2:00 pm	Ohio	W 79–70	6–8	Kimmel Arena (2,389); Asheville, NC
01/08/2014; 7:00 pm	at Gardner–Webb	W 81–77	7–8 (1–0)	Paul Porter Arena (1,950); Boiling Springs, NC
01/11/2014; 2:00 pm	Presbyterian	W 84–70	8–8 (2–0)	Kimmel Arena (1,615); Asheville, NC
01/15/2014; 7:00 pm	at Coastal Carolina	L 78–81	8–9 (2–1)	HTC Center (2,879); Conway, SC
01/18/2014; 2:00 pm	at Charleston Southern	W 80–76	9–9 (3–1)	CSU Field House (922); Charleston, SC
01/22/2014; 7:00 pm	Winthrop	W 81–66	10–9 (4–1)	Kimmel Arena (1,741); Asheville, NC
01/25/2014; 7:00 pm	at High Point	L 67–78	10–10 (4–2)	Millis Center (1,412); High Point, NC
01/28/2014; 7:00 pm	VMI	L 105–109	10–11 (4–3)	Kimmel Arena (959); Asheville, NC
02/01/2014; 5:00 pm	at Longwood	W 67–66	11–11 (5–3)	Willett Hall (1,757); Farmville, VA
02/05/2014; 7:00 pm	Campbell	W 86–73	12–11 (6–3)	Kimmel Arena (1,657); Asheville, NC
02/08/2014; 2:00 pm	Liberty	W 75–72	13–11 (7–3)	Kimmel Arena (2,456); Asheville, NC
02/12/2014; 7:00 pm	at Radford	L 92–102	13–12 (7–4)	Dedmon Center (1,573); Radford, VA
02/15/2014; 7:45 pm	at Presbyterian	L 71–72	13–13 (7–5)	Templeton Physical Education Center (956); Clinton, SC
02/19/2014; 7:00 pm	Charleston Southern	W 82–71	14–13 (8–5)	Kimmel Arena (1,737); Asheville, NC
02/22/2014; 2:00 pm	Coastal Carolina	W 100–85	15–13 (9–5)	Kimmel Arena (1,789); Asheville, NC
02/26/2014; 7:00 pm	at Winthrop	L 100–107 ^{OT}	15–14 (9–6)	Winthrop Coliseum (1,359); Rock Hill, SC
03/01/2014; 4:30 pm	Gardner–Webb	W 83–71	16–14 (10–6)	Kimmel Arena (2,756); Asheville, NC
Big South tournament
03/07/2014; 2:00 pm, ESPN3	vs. Radford; Quarterfinals	W 96–87	17–14	HTC Center (1,921); Conway, SC
03/08/2014; 12:00 pm, ESPN3	vs. Winthrop; Semifinals	L 79–80	17–15	HTC Center (2,892); Conway, SC
*Non-conference game. ^{#}Rankings from AP Poll. (#) Tournament seedings in parentheses. All times are in Eastern Time.
