= 2013–14 Presbyterian Blue Hose men's basketball team =

American college basketball season

2013–14 Presbyterian Blue Hose men's basketball
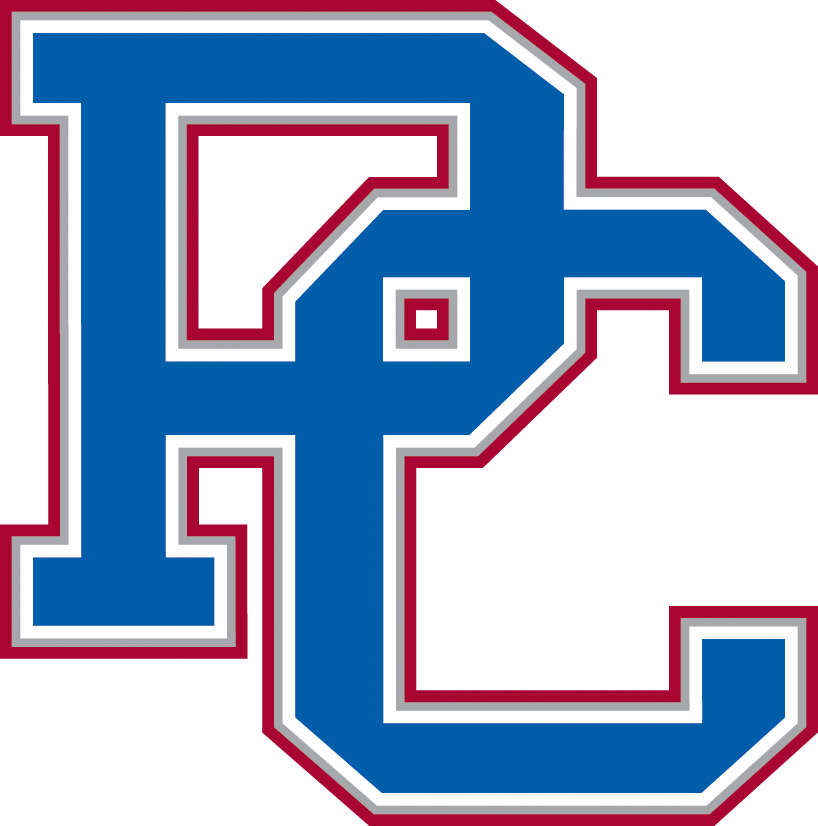
- Conference: Big South Conference
- South Division
- Record: 6–26 (2–14 Big South)
- Head coach: Gregg Nibert (25th season)
- Assistant coaches: Justin Smith; Pierre Miller; John Reynolds
- Home arena: Templeton Physical Education Center

2013–14 Big South men's basketball standings
	Conf.				Overall
Team	W		L	PCT	W		L	PCT
North
High Point	12	–	4	.750	16	–	15	.516
VMI	11	–	5	.688	22	–	13	.629
Radford	10	–	6	.625	22	–	13	.629
Campbell	6	–	10	.375	12	–	20	.375
Liberty	5	–	11	.313	11	–	21	.344
Longwood	3	–	13	.188	8	–	24	.250
South
Coastal Carolina †	11	–	5	.688	21	–	13	.618
Winthrop	10	–	6	.625	20	–	13	.606
Gardner–Webb	10	–	6	.625	18	–	15	.545
UNC Asheville	10	–	6	.625	17	–	15	.531
Charleston Southern	6	–	10	.375	13	–	18	.419
Presbyterian	2	–	14	.125	6	–	26	.188
† 2014 Big South tournament winner

The 2013–14 Presbyterian Blue Hose men's basketball team represented Presbyterian College during the 2013–14 NCAA Division I men's basketball season. The Blue Hose, led by 25th year head coach Gregg Nibert, played their home games at the Templeton Physical Education Center and were members of the South Division of the Big South Conference. They finished the season 6–26, 2–14 in Big South play to finish in last place in the South Division. They lost in the first round of the Big South tournament to Radford.

== Roster ==
Number	Name	Position	Height	Weight	Year	Hometown
0	Danny Herrera	Forward	6–5	215	Junior	Miami, Florida
2	Markus Terry	Guard	6–1	200	Freshman	Johns Creek, Georgia
4	Austin Anderson	Guard	6–5	172	Sophomore	Piedmont, South Carolina
10	Russell McCray	Guard	5–11	191	Junior	Columbia, South Carolina
11	Bradford Allen	Guard	6–0	176	Freshman	Charleston, South Carolina
14	Reggie Dillard	Guard	6–4	220	Freshman	Greensboro, North Carolina
15	William Truss	Center	6–8	265	Junior	Birmingham, Alabama
21	Jordan Downing	Guard	6–5	208	Junior	Huntersville, North Carolina
24	Will Adams	Guard	5–10	170	Freshman	Johnson City, Tennessee
31	Mac Lake	Forward	6–4	201	Junior	Prosperity, South Carolina
33	Charlie Inclan	Guard	5–10	165	Freshman	Spartanburg, South Carolina
34	Ed Drew	Forward	6–5	205	Freshman	Suffolk, Virginia
44	Jake Campbell	Center	7–0	248	Sophomore	Centerville, Ohio

== Schedule ==
Date time, TV	Opponent	Result	Record	Site (attendance) city, state
Regular season
11/08/2013*; 7:30 pm, ESPN3	at Georgia Tech	L 57–88	0–1	McCamish Pavilion (6,798); Atlanta, GA
11/12/2013*; 8:00 pm	at The Citadel	L 68–82	0–2	McAlister Field House (1,211); Charleston, SC
11/15/2013*; 7:00 pm	at Wake Forest	L 48–69	0–3	LJVM Coliseum (7,823); Winston-Salem, NC
11/18/2013*; 7:45 pm	Toccoa Falls	W 86–76	1–3	Templeton Center (506); Clinton, SC
11/21/2013*; 7:00 pm	at Old Dominion; Cancún Challenge	L 51–69	1–4	Ted Constant Convocation Center (5,699); Norfolk, VA
11/23/2013*; 1:30 pm	at West Virginia; Cancún Challenge	L 55–88	1–5	WVU Coliseum (5,067); Morgantown, WV
11/26/2013*; 12:30 pm	vs. Bowling Green; Cancun Challenge	L 45–67	1–6	Moon Palace Resort (220); Cancún, MX
11/27/2013*; 1:30 pm	vs. Georgia Southern; Cancun Challenge	L 66–76	1–7	Moon Palace Resort (934); Cancún, MX
12/03/2013*; 7:00 pm	at UNC Greensboro	W 87–66	2–7	Greensboro Coliseum (1,938); Greensboro, NC
12/05/2013*; 7:00 pm	Montreat	W 91–58	3–7	Templeton Center (275); Clinton, SC
12/07/2013*; 7:45 pm	Furman	L 59–74	3–8	Templeton Center (950); Clinton, SC
12/16/2013*; 7:00 pm	UT Martin	L 70–73	3–9	Templeton Center (211); Clinton, SC
12/18/2013*; 7:00 pm	Appalachian State	W 74–69	4–9	Templeton Center (212); Clinton, SC
12/30/2013*; 8:00 pm	at Samford	L 59–71	4–10	Pete Hanna Center (718); Homewood, AL
01/05/2014*; 2:00 pm	at Marshall	L 49–77	4–11	Cam Henderson Center (4,358); Huntington, WV
01/08/2014; 7:00 pm	Winthrop	L 67–71	4–12 (0–1)	Templeton Center (925); Clinton, SC
01/11/2014; 2:00 pm	at UNC Asheville	L 70–84	4–13 (0–2)	Kimmel Arena (1,615); Asheville, NC
01/15/2014; 7:30 pm	at Charleston Southern	L 58–95	4–14 (0–3)	CSU Field House (858); Charleston, SC
01/22/2014; 2:00 pm	Gardner–Webb	L 58–67	4–15 (0–4)	Templeton Center (810); Clinton, SC
01/25/2014; 7:00 pm	Coastal Carolina	L 72–84	4–16 (0–5)	Templeton Center (1,097); Clinton, SC
01/25/2014; 7:00 pm	at Liberty	L 53–65	4–17 (0–6)	Vines Center (2,624); Lynchburg, VA
01/28/2014; 7:00 pm	High Point	L 74–81	4–18 (0–7)	Templeton Center (603); Clinton, SC
01/31/2014; 7:00 pm	at VMI	L 93–107	4–19 (0–8)	Cameron Hall (2,856); Lexington, VA
02/05/2014; 7:00 pm	Longwood	W 77–62	5–19 (1–8)	Templeton Center (498); Clinton, SC
02/08/2014; 2:00 pm	Radford	L 66–83	5–20 (1–9)	Templeton Center (653); Clinton, SC
02/12/2014; 7:00 pm	at Campbell	L 66–77	5–21 (1–10)	Gore Arena (1,249); Buies Creek, NC
02/15/2014; 7:45 pm	UNC Asheville	W 72–71	6–21 (2–10)	Templeton Center (956); Clinton, SC
02/19/2014; 7:00 pm	at Gardner–Webb	L 70–79	6–22 (2–11)	Paul Porter Arena; Boiling Springs, NC
02/22/2014; 7:00 pm	Charleston Southern	L 47–86	6–23 (2–12)	Templeton Center (1,053); Clinton, SC
02/26/2014; 7:00 pm	at Coastal Carolina	L 51–70	6–24 (2–13)	HTC Center (2,217); Conway, SC
03/01/2014; 4:00 pm	at Wintrhop	L 60–82	6–25 (2–14)	Winthrop Coliseum (1,696); Rock Hill, SC
Big South tournament
03/05/2014; 2:00 pm	vs. Radford; First round	L 73–78	6–26	HTC Center (1,448); Conway, SC
*Non-conference game. ^{#}Rankings from AP Poll. (#) Tournament seedings in parentheses. All times are in Eastern Time.
