= 2013–14 Charleston Southern Buccaneers men's basketball team =

American college basketball season

2013–14 Charleston Southern Buccaneers men's basketball
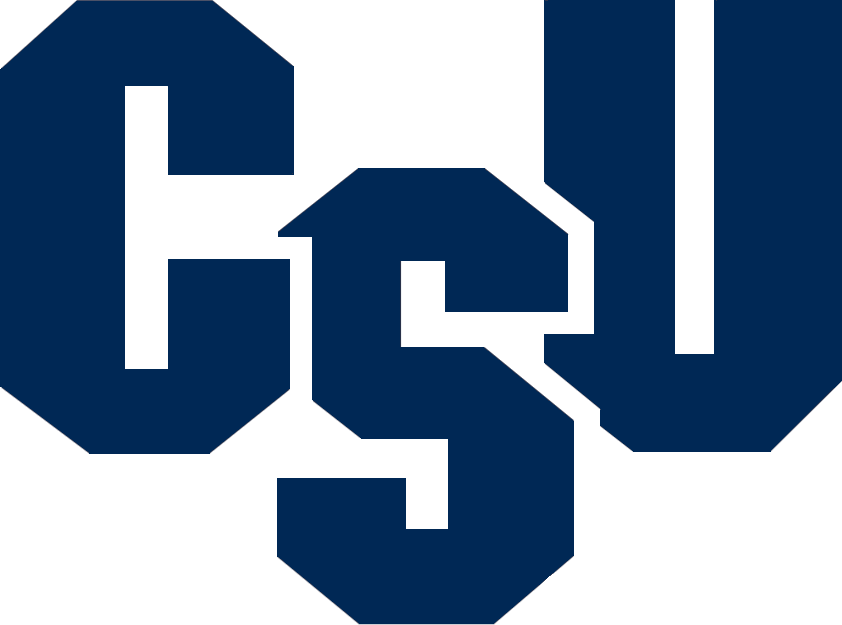
- Conference: Big South Conference
- South Division
- Record: 13–18 (6–10 Big South)
- Head coach: Barclay Radebaugh (9th season)
- Assistant coaches: BJ McKie; Ahmad Smith; Brad Dobbels
- Home arena: CSU Field House

2013–14 Big South men's basketball standings
	Conf.				Overall
Team	W		L	PCT	W		L	PCT
North
High Point	12	–	4	.750	16	–	15	.516
VMI	11	–	5	.688	22	–	13	.629
Radford	10	–	6	.625	22	–	13	.629
Campbell	6	–	10	.375	12	–	20	.375
Liberty	5	–	11	.313	11	–	21	.344
Longwood	3	–	13	.188	8	–	24	.250
South
Coastal Carolina †	11	–	5	.688	21	–	13	.618
Winthrop	10	–	6	.625	20	–	13	.606
Gardner–Webb	10	–	6	.625	18	–	15	.545
UNC Asheville	10	–	6	.625	17	–	15	.531
Charleston Southern	6	–	10	.375	13	–	18	.419
Presbyterian	2	–	14	.125	6	–	26	.188
† 2014 Big South tournament winner

The 2013–14 Charleston Southern Buccaneers men's basketball team represented Charleston Southern University during the 2013–14 NCAA Division I men's basketball season. The Buccaneers, led by ninth year head coach Barclay Radebaugh, played their home games at the CSU Field House and were members of the South Division of the Big South Conference. They finished the season 13–18, 6–10 in Big South play to in fifth place in the South Division. They advanced to the quarterfinals of the Big South Conference tournament where they lost to Coastal Carolina.

== Roster ==
Number	Name	Position	Height	Weight	Year	Hometown
0	Arlon Harper	Guard	6–2	180	Junior	College Park, Georgia
1	Will Saunders	Forward	6–7	190	Junior	London, England
2	Malcolm Bernard	Forward	6–5	191	Sophomore	Middleburg, Florida
4	Sheldon Strickland	Guard	6–0	175	Senior	Lithonia, Georgia
5	Saah Nimley	Guard	5–8	158	Junior	Lawrenceville, Georgia
11	Matt Kennedy	Guard	6–3	180	Senior	Charleston, South Carolina
12	Mitchell Deter	Guard	6–3	205	Senior	Columbia, South Carolina
15	Paul Gombwer	Forward	6–6	217	Junior	Kaduna, Nigeria
21	Bakari Copeland	Forward	6–6	222	Freshman	Lithonia, Georgia
23	Ty'Quan Bitting	Forward/Center	6–8	185	Freshman	Winston-Salem, North Carolina
24	Cedrick Bowen	Forward	6–5	232	Junior	Woodstock, Georgia
30	Thomas Odom	Guard	6–2	188	Senior	Florence, South Carolina
33	Greg Dorleus	Forward	6–9	258	Senior	Oviedo, Florida
35	Allie Fullah	Forward/Center	6–8	235	Senior	London, England

== Schedule ==
Date time, TV	Opponent	Result	Record	Site (attendance) city, state
Regular season
11/08/2013*; 8:00 pm	Johnson (TN)	W 130–51	1–0	CSU Field House (825); Charleston, SC
11/10/2013*; 2:00 pm	at Delaware	W 95–93	2–0	Bob Carpenter Center (2,189); Newark, DE
11/13/2013*; 7:30 pm	UNC Wilmington	L 78–80 ^{OT}	2–1	CSU Field House (954); Charleston, SC
11/17/2013*; 6:00 pm, RTRM	at No. 22 New Mexico	L 93–109	2–2	The Pit (14,146); Albuquerque, NM
11/20/2013*; 7:00 pm, FSSW	at No. 20 Baylor	L 64–69	2–3	Ferrell Center (5,185); Waco, TX
11/26/2013*; 7:30 pm	Trinity (FL)	W 105–58	3–3	CSU Field House (879); Charleston, SC
12/03/2013*; 7:30 pm	Delaware	L 80–85	3–4	CSU Field House (853); Charleston, SC
12/14/2013*; 8:30 pm	at Alabama	L 45–59	3–5	Coleman Coliseum (10,132); Tuscaloosa, AL
12/18/2013*; 7:00 pm	at Western Carolina	L 84–92	3–6	Ramsey Center (682); Cullowhee, NC
12/21/2013*; 1:00 pm	at Central Arkansas	W 97–90 ^{2OT}	4–6	Farris Center (557); Conway, AR
12/28/2013*; 5:30 pm	St. Andrews (NC)	W 122–40	5–6	CSU Field House (606); Charleston, SC
12/30/2013*; 7:00 pm	at Florida State	L 59–67	5–7	Donald L. Tucker Center (5,159); Tallahassee, FL
01/06/2014*; 6:00 pm	Columbia International	W 105–45	6–7	CSU Field House (731); Charleston, SC
01/08/2014; 7:30 pm	Coastal Carolina	W 70–58	7–7 (1–0)	CSU Field House (912); Charleston, SC
01/11/2014; 2:00 pm	at Winthrop	L 68–85	7–8 (1–1)	Winthrop Coliseum (1,327); Rock Hill, SC
01/15/2014; 7:30 pm	Presbyterian	W 95–58	8–8 (2–1)	CSU Field House (858); Charleston, SC
01/18/2014; 5:30 pm	UNC Asheville	L 76–80	8–9 (2–2)	CSU Field House (922); Charleston, SC
01/22/2014; 7:00 pm	at Gardner–Webb	W 78–76	9–9 (3–2)	Paul Porter Arena (1,450); Boiling Springs, NC
01/25/2014; 5:30 pm	Longwood	L 85–88	9–10 (3–3)	CSU Field House (794); Charleston, SC
01/29/2014; 7:00 pm	at Campbell	L 57–65	9–11 (3–4)	John W. Pope, Jr. Convocation Center (2,012); Buies Creek, NC
02/01/2014; 5:30 pm	Liberty	W 80–66	10–11 (4–4)	CSU Field House (840); Charleston, SC
02/05/2014; 7:30 pm	Radford	L 76–82	10–12 (4–5)	CSU Field House (898); Charleston, SC
02/08/2014; 1:00 pm	at VMI	L 84–92	10–13 (4–6)	Cameron Hall (3,627); Lexington, VA
02/15/2014; 5:30 pm	Winthrop	W 84–64	11–13 (5–6)	CSU Field House (789); Charleston, SC
02/17/2014; 7:00 pm	at High Point; Postponed from 2/13	L 70–76	11–14 (5–7)	Millis Center (875); High Point, NC
02/19/2014; 7:00 pm	at UNC Asheville	L 71–82	11–15 (5–8)	Kimmel Arena (1,737); Asheville, NC
02/22/2014; 7:00 pm	at Presbyterian	W 86–47	12–15 (6–8)	Templeton Physical Education Center (1,053); Clinton, SC
02/26/2014; 7:30 pm	Gardner–Webb	L 76–78	12–16 (6–9)	CSU Field House (N/A); Charleston, SC
03/01/2014; 2:00 pm	at Coastal Carolina	L 61–63	12–17 (6–10)	HTC Center (2,939); Conway, SC
Big South tournament
03/05/2014; 6:00 pm	vs. Campbell; First Round	W 81–71	13–17	HTC Center (1,648); Conway, SC
03/06/2014; 6:00 pm, ESPN3	at Coastal Carolina; Quarterfinals	L 68–73 ^{2OT}	13–18	HTC Center (3,176); Conway, SC
*Non-conference game. ^{#}Rankings from AP Poll. (#) Tournament seedings in parentheses. All times are in Eastern Time.
