= 2013–14 Radford Highlanders men's basketball team =

American college basketball season

2013–14 Radford Highlanders men's basketball
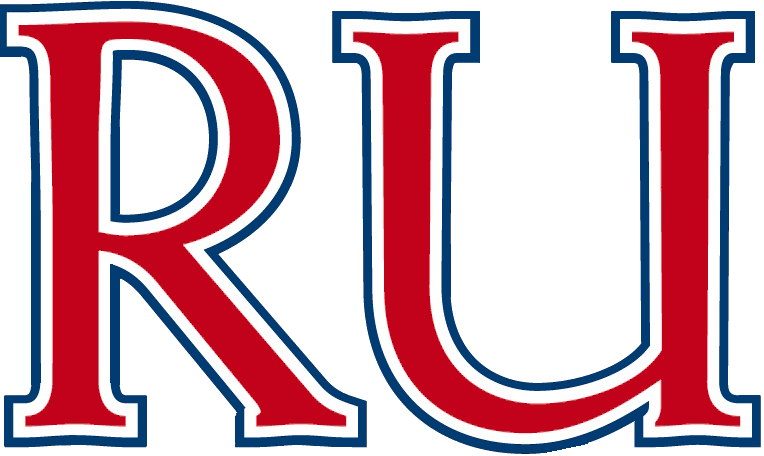

CBI quarterfinals vs. Old Dominion, L 59–82
- Conference: Big South Conference
- North Division
- Record: 22–13 (10–6 Big South)
- Head coach: Mike Jones (3rd season)
- Assistant coaches: Kyle Getter; Chris Hawkins; JD Byers
- Home arena: Dedmon Center

2013–14 Big South men's basketball standings
	Conf.				Overall
Team	W		L	PCT	W		L	PCT
North
High Point	12	–	4	.750	16	–	15	.516
VMI	11	–	5	.688	22	–	13	.629
Radford	10	–	6	.625	22	–	13	.629
Campbell	6	–	10	.375	12	–	20	.375
Liberty	5	–	11	.313	11	–	21	.344
Longwood	3	–	13	.188	8	–	24	.250
South
Coastal Carolina †	11	–	5	.688	21	–	13	.618
Winthrop	10	–	6	.625	20	–	13	.606
Gardner–Webb	10	–	6	.625	18	–	15	.545
UNC Asheville	10	–	6	.625	17	–	15	.531
Charleston Southern	6	–	10	.375	13	–	18	.419
Presbyterian	2	–	14	.125	6	–	26	.188
† 2014 Big South tournament winner

The 2013–14 Radford Highlanders men's basketball team represented Radford University during the 2013–14 NCAA Division I men's basketball season. The Highlanders, led by third-year head coach Mike Jones, played their home games at the Dedmon Center in Radford, Virginia, and were members of the North Division of the Big South Conference. They finished the season 22–13, 10–6 in Big South play, to finish in third place in the North Division. They advanced to the quarterfinals of the Big South Conference tournament where they lost to UNC Asheville. They were invited to the College Basketball Invitational where they defeated Oregon State in the first round before losing in the quarterfinals to Old Dominion.

== Roster ==
Number	Name	Position	Height	Weight	Year	Hometown
00	Kion Brown	Forward	6'7"	210	Sophomore	Richmond, VA
1	Taj Owens	Guard	5'9"	160	Sophomore	Chesapeake, VA
2	Javonte Green	Guard	6'4"	205	Junior	Petersburg, VA
5	Rashaun Davis	Guard	5'11"	185	Sophomore	Charlotte, NC
10	R.J. Price	Guard	5'11"	180	Junior	Richmond, VA
11	Ya Ya Anderson	Guard	6'2"	195	Sophomore	Palmyra, VA
12	Allen Dickerson	Guard	6'2"	210	Senior	Radford, VA
14	Justin Cousin	Guard	6'0"	195	Freshman	Burlington, NC
15	Lucas Dyer	Forward	6'8"	215	Sophomore	Richmond, VA
22	Kyle Gonzalez	Guard	6'4"	185	Sophomore	Springfield, VA
30	Jalen Carethers	Forward	6'8"	205	Junior	Burlington, NC
32	Juwan Wells	Guard/Forward	6'6"	195	Sophomore	La Plata, MD
33	Kyle Noreen	Guard	6'4"	210	Junior	Minneapolis, MN
44	Hulian Terrell	Center	6'6"	240	Freshman	Kennesaw, GA
55	Brandon Holcomb	Center	6'7"	215	Sophomore	Murrieta, CA

== Schedule ==
Date time, TV	Opponent	Result	Record	Site (attendance) city, state
Regular season
November 8, 2013*; 7:00 p.m.	at George Washington	L 54–76	0–1	Charles E. Smith Athletic Center (2,531); Washington, D.C.
November 11, 2013*; 7:00 p.m.	Chattanooga	W 89–78	1–1	Dedmon Center (2,011); Radford, VA
November 16, 2013*; 4:00 p.m.	at Brevard	W 105–57	2–1	Dedmon Center (1,764); Radford, VA
November 25, 2013*; 7:00 p.m.	at Cornell	W 86–71	4–1	Newman Arena (644); Ithaca, NY
November 29, 2013*; 2:00 p.m.	at Virginia Tech; New River Valley rivalry	L 56–81	4–2	Cassell Coliseum (5,217); Blacksburg, VA
December 4, 2013*; 7:00 p.m.	Central Penn	W 111–72	5–2	Dedmon Center (1,368); Radford, VA
December 7, 2013*; 4:00 p.m.	North Carolina A&T	W 72–52	6–2	Dedmon Center (1,741); Radford, VA
December 16, 2013*; 10:00 p.m.	at Santa Clara; Las Vegas Classic	L 62–75	6–3	Leavey Center (919); Santa Clara, CA
December 18, 2013*; 10:00 p.m.	at UNLV; Las Vegas Classic	L 62–81	6–4	Thomas & Mack Center (11,547); Paradise, NV
December 22, 2013*; 3:00 p.m.	vs. Sacred Heart; Las Vegas Classic	W 94–78	7–4	Orleans Arena (N/A); Paradise, NV
December 23, 2013*; 5:00 p.m.	vs. Florida Gulf Coast; Las Vegas Classic	W 64–63	8–4	Orleans Arena (N/A); Paradise, NV
December 30, 2013*; 5:30 p.m.	Houghton	W 80–51	9–4	Dedmon Center (771); Radford, VA
January 2, 2014*; 5:30 p.m.	The Citadel	W 76–59	10–4	Dedmon Center (479); Radford, VA
January 4, 2014*; 4:00 p.m.	at Hampton	L 60–87	10–5	Hampton Convocation Center (651); Hampton, VA
January 8, 2014; 7:00 p.m.	Liberty	W 72–63	11–5 (1–0)	Dedmon Center (N/A); Radford, VA
January 10, 2014; 7:00 p.m.	at High Point	W 81–72	12–5 (2–0)	Millis Center (1,573); High Point, NC
January 15, 2014; 7:00 p.m.	VMI	L 88–101	12–6 (2–1)	Dedmon Center (2,058); Radford, VA
January 18, 2014; 4:00 p.m.	Longwood	W 93–76	13–6 (3–1)	Dedmon Center (1,772); Radford, VA
January 22, 2014; 7:00 p.m.	at Campbell	L 63–65	13–7 (3–2)	John W. Pope Jr. Convocation Center (1,847); Buies Creek, NC
January 25, 2014; 2:00 p.m.	Coastal Carolina	L 61–69	13–8 (3–3)	Dedmon Center (2,349); Radford, VA
January 29, 2014; 7:00 p.m.	at Winthrop	W 76–64	14–8 (4–3)	Winthrop Coliseum (1,223); Rock Hill, SC
February 1, 2014; 4:00 p.m.	Gardner–Webb	L 72–73 ^{OT}	14–9 (4–4)	Dedmon Center (1,941); Radford, VA
February 5, 2014; 7:30 p.m.	at Charleston Southern	W 82–76	15–9 (5–4)	CSU Field House (898); Charleston, SC
February 8, 2014; 2:00 p.m.	at Presbyterian	W 83–66	16–9 (6–4)	Templeton Physical Education Center (653); Clinton, SC
February 12, 2014; 7:00 p.m.	UNC Asheville	W 102–92	17–9 (7–4)	Dedmon Center (1,573); Radford, VA
February 15, 2014; 4:00 p.m.	High Point	L 65–72	17–10 (7–5)	Dedmon Center (1,669); Radford, VA
February 19, 2014; 7:00 p.m.	at Longwood	W 86–75	18–10 (8–5)	Willett Hall (1,419); Farmville, VA
February 22, 2014; 1:00 p.m.	at VMI	L 76–88	18–11 (8–6)	Cameron Hall (3,314); Lexington, VA
February 26, 2014; 7:00 p.m.	Campbell	W 82–78	19–11 (9–6)	Dedmon Center (1,672); Radford, VA
March 1, 2014; 7:00 p.m.	at Liberty	W 87–83	20–11 (10–6)	Vines Center (2,524); Lynchburg, VA
Big South tournament
March 5, 2014; 2:00 p.m.	vs. Presbyterian; First round	W 78–73	21–11	HTC Center (1,448); Conway, SC
March 7, 2014; 2:00 p.m., ESPN3	vs. UNC Asheville; Quarterfinals	L 87–96	21–12	HTC Center (1,921); Conway, SC
CBI
March 19, 2014*; 10:00 p.m.	at Oregon State; First round	W 96–92	22–12	Gill Coliseum (1,351); Corvallis, OR
March 24, 2014*; 7:00 p.m.	at Old Dominion; Quarterfinals	L 59–82	22–13	Ted Constant Convocation Center (3,486); Norfolk, VA
*Non-conference game. ^{#}Rankings from AP poll. (#) Tournament seedings in parentheses. All times are in Eastern.
