= 2013–14 Gardner–Webb Runnin' Bulldogs men's basketball team =

American college basketball season

2013–14 Gardner–Webb Runnin' Bulldogs men's basketball
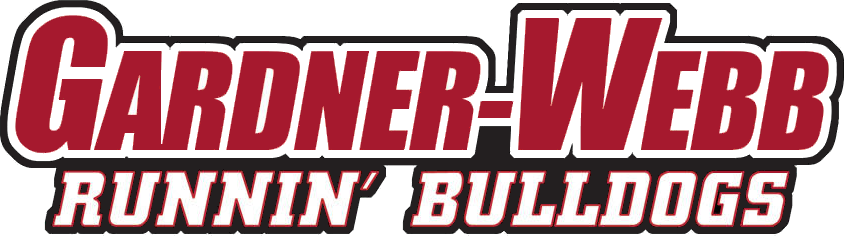
- Conference: Big South Conference
- South Division
- Record: 18–15 (10–6 Big South)
- Head coach: Tim Craft (1st season)
- Assistant coaches: Paul Hemrick; Jeremy Luther; Takayo Siddle
- Home arena: Paul Porter Arena

2013–14 Big South men's basketball standings
	Conf.				Overall
Team	W		L	PCT	W		L	PCT
North
High Point	12	–	4	.750	16	–	15	.516
VMI	11	–	5	.688	22	–	13	.629
Radford	10	–	6	.625	22	–	13	.629
Campbell	6	–	10	.375	12	–	20	.375
Liberty	5	–	11	.313	11	–	21	.344
Longwood	3	–	13	.188	8	–	24	.250
South
Coastal Carolina †	11	–	5	.688	21	–	13	.618
Winthrop	10	–	6	.625	20	–	13	.606
Gardner–Webb	10	–	6	.625	18	–	15	.545
UNC Asheville	10	–	6	.625	17	–	15	.531
Charleston Southern	6	–	10	.375	13	–	18	.419
Presbyterian	2	–	14	.125	6	–	26	.188
† 2014 Big South tournament winner

The 2013–14 Gardner–Webb Runnin' Bulldogs men's basketball team represented Gardner–Webb University during the 2013–14 NCAA Division I men's basketball season. The Runnin' Bulldogs, led by first year head coach Tim Craft, played their home games at the Paul Porter Arena and were members of the South Division of the Big South Conference. They finished the season 18–15, 10–6 in Big South play to finish in a three-way tie for second place in the South Division. They advanced to the quarterfinals of the Big South Conference tournament where they lost to VMI.

== Roster ==
Number	Name	Position	Height	Weight	Year	Hometown
0	Donta Harper	Forward	6–7	205	Junior	Winterville, North Carolina
2	Tyler Strange	Guard	5–10	185	Junior	Leominster, Massachusetts
3	Josh Castellanos	Guard	6–1	180	Senior	Orlando, Florida
4	Logan Stumpf	Guard	6–6	210	RS–Freshman	Harrisburg, Pennsylvania
5	Onzie Branch	Forward	6–6	215	Senior	Topeka, Kansas
11	Naji Hibbert	Guard	6–5	190	RS–Senior	Baltimore, Maryland
15	Jarvis Davis	Guard	6–0	180	RS–Junior	Columbia, South Carolina
20	Tyrell Nelson	Center	6–7	230	Freshman	Charlotte, North Carolina
23	Andonis Burbage	Guard	6–5	200	Junior	Orlando, Florida
24	Isaiah Ivey	Guard	6–2	190	Sophomore	Georgetown, Kentucky
30	Adam Sweeney	Guard	5–10	180	Sophomore	Madison, Ohio
33	Corey Hansley	Center	6–8	220	Junior	Candler, North Carolina
35	Jerome Hill	Forward	6–5	210	Sophomore	Adel, Georgia
54	Mike Byron	Center	6–10	245	Senior	San Antonio, Texas

== Schedule ==
Date time, TV	Opponent	Result	Record	Site (attendance) city, state
Regular season
11/08/2013*; 7:00 pm, FS Ohio	at Xavier	L 59–83	0–1	Cintas Center (10,250); Cincinnati, OH
11/12/2013*; 7:30 pm	at Furman	L 64–75	0–2	Timmons Arena (1,043); Greenville, SC
11/16/2013*; 7:30 pm	Allen	W 92–51	2–2	Paul Porter Arena (745); Boiling Springs, NC
11/19/2013*; 7:40 pm	Jacksonville	W 87–78	1–2	Paul Porter Arena (2,350); Boiling Springs, NC
11/23/2013*; 3:30 pm, ESPN3	at Missouri; Las Vegas Invitational	L 63–72	2–3	Mizzou Arena (6,734); Columbia, MO
11/25/2013*; 8:00 pm, BTN Digital	at Northwestern; Las Vegas Invitational	L 59–72	2–4	Welsh-Ryan Arena (5,443); Evanston, IL
11/28/2013*; 2:30 pm	vs. IUPUI; Las Vegas Invitational	W 61–54	3–4	Orleans Arena (N/A); Paradise, NV
11/29/2013*; 6:00 pm	vs. Morehead State; Las Vegas Invitational	W 86–82 ^{OT}	4–4	Orleans Arena (N/A); Paradise, NV
12/04/2013*; 7:00 pm	Wofford	L 62–65	4–5	Paul Porter Arena (1,410); Boiling Springs, NC
12/07/2013*; 2:00 pm	at The Citadel	W 67–55	5–5	McAlister Field House (755); Charleston, SC
12/14/2013*; 7:00 pm	Clearwater Christian	W 106–54	6–5	Paul Porter Arena (1,150); Boiling Springs, NC
12/16/2013*; 7:00 pm, ESPNU	at No. 8 Duke	L 66–85	6–6	Cameron Indoor Stadium (9,314); Durham, NC
12/19/2013*; 11:30 am	at Georgia	L 49–58	6–7	Stegeman Coliseum (8,719); Athens, GA
12/21/2013*; 1:00 pm	Hiwassee	W 90–54	7–7	Paul Porter Arena (250); Boiling Springs, NC
01/02/2014*; 7:00 pm	at Delaware State	L 65–66 ^{OT}	7–8	Memorial Hall (182); Dover, DE
01/08/2014; 7:00 pm	UNC Asheville	L 77–81	7–9 (0–1)	Paul Porter Arena (1,950); Boiling Springs, NC
01/11/2014; 7:00 pm	Coastal Carolina	L 69–81	7–10 (0–2)	Paul Porter Arena (1,982); Boiling Springs, NC
01/15/2014; 2:00 pm	at Winthrop	W 56–51	8–10 (1–2)	Winthrop Coliseum (1,955); Rock Hill, SC
01/18/2014; 7:00 pm	at Presbyterian	W 67–58	9–10 (2–2)	Templeton Physical Education Center (810); Clinton, SC
01/22/2014; 7:00 pm	Charleston Southern	L 76–78	9–11 (2–3)	Paul Porter Arena (1,450); Boiling Springs, NC
01/25/2014; 7:00 pm	Campbell	W 66–48	10–11 (3–3)	Paul Porter Arena (2,230); Boiling Springs, NC
01/29/2014; 7:00 pm	at Longwood	W 82–62	11–11 (4–3)	Willett Hall (1,207); Farmville, VA
02/01/2014; 4:00 pm	at Radford	W 73–72 ^{OT}	12–11 (5–3)	Dedmon Center (1,941); Radford, VA
02/05/2014; 7:00 pm	VMI	L 104–108 ^{4OT}	12–12 (5–4)	Paul Porter Arena (1,450); Boiling Springs, NC
02/08/2014; 7:00 pm	High Point	W 80–76	13–12 (6–4)	Paul Porter Arena (2,090); Boiling Springs, NC
02/11/2014; 7:00 pm	at Liberty	W 68–52	14–12 (7–4)	Vines Center (1,645); Lynchburg, VA
02/15/2014; 7:00 pm	at Coastal Carolina	L 60–75	14–13 (7–5)	HTC Center (2,123); Conway, SC
02/19/2014; 7:00 pm	Presbyterian	W 79–70	15–13 (8–5)	Paul Porter Arena (1,104); Boiling Springs, NC
02/22/2014; 7:00 pm	Winthrop	W 85–79 ^{OT}	16–13 (9–5)	Paul Porter Arena (1,898); Boiling Springs, NC
02/26/2014; 7:30 pm	at Charleston Southern	W 78–76	17–13 (10–5)	CSU Field House (N/A); Charleston, SC
03/01/2014; 4:30 pm	at UNC Asheville	L 71–83	17–14 (10–6)	Kimmel Arena (2,756); Asheville, NC
Big South tournament
03/05/2014; 8:00 pm	vs. Longwood; First round	W 81–65	18–14	HTC Center (1,648); Conway, SC
03/07/2014; 8:00 pm	vs. VMI; Quarterfinals	L 77–90	18–15	HTC Center (3,176); Conway, SC
*Non-conference game. ^{#}Rankings from AP Poll. (#) Tournament seedings in parentheses. All times are in Eastern Time.
