= 2013–14 High Point Panthers men's basketball team =

American college basketball season

2013–14 High Point Panthers men's basketball

Big South Regular Season Champions Big South North Division Champions

NIT, First round
- Conference: Big South Conference
- North Division
- Record: 16–15 (12–4 Big South)
- Head coach: Scott Cherry (5th season)
- Assistant coaches: Ahmad Dorsett; Neill Berry; Trey Brown
- Home arena: Millis Athletic Convocation Center

2013–14 Big South men's basketball standings
	Conf.				Overall
Team	W		L	PCT	W		L	PCT
North
High Point	12	–	4	.750	16	–	15	.516
VMI	11	–	5	.688	22	–	13	.629
Radford	10	–	6	.625	22	–	13	.629
Campbell	6	–	10	.375	12	–	20	.375
Liberty	5	–	11	.313	11	–	21	.344
Longwood	3	–	13	.188	8	–	24	.250
South
Coastal Carolina †	11	–	5	.688	21	–	13	.618
Winthrop	10	–	6	.625	20	–	13	.606
Gardner–Webb	10	–	6	.625	18	–	15	.545
UNC Asheville	10	–	6	.625	17	–	15	.531
Charleston Southern	6	–	10	.375	13	–	18	.419
Presbyterian	2	–	14	.125	6	–	26	.188
† 2014 Big South tournament winner

The 2013–14 High Point Panthers men's basketball team represented High Point University during the 2013–14 NCAA Division I men's basketball season. The Panthers, led by fifth year head coach Scott Cherry, played their home games at the Millis Athletic Convocation Center and were members of the North Division of the Big South Conference. They finished the season 16–15, 12–4 in Big South play to be champions of the North Division and, with the conferences best overall conference record, they were regular season Big South champions. They lost in the quarterfinals of the Big South tournament to Winthrop. As a regular season conference champions who failed to win their conference tournament, they earned an automatic bid to the National Invitation Tournament where they lost in the first round to Minnesota.

== Roster ==
Number	Name	Position	Height	Weight	Year	Hometown
0	John Brown	Forward	6–8	205	RS-Sophomore	Jacksonville, Florida
1	Dejuan McGaughy	Guard	6–1	210	Senior	Columbus, Ohio
2	Brian Richardson	Guard	6–4	175	Junior	Wilson, North Carolina
3	Derrell Edwards	Guard	6–2	210	Senior	Baltimore, Maryland
4	Cliff Cornish	Forward	6–9	250	RS–Freshman	Glen Burnie, Maryland
10	Tarique Thompson	Forward	6–5	210	Freshman	Raeford, North Carolina
11	Haiishen McIntyre	Guard	6–2	175	Sophomore	Harrisburg, Pennsylvania
12	Jorge Perez-Laham	Guard	6–1	187	Freshman	Canóvanas, Puerto Rico
13	Allan Chaney	Forward	6–9	240	RS–Senior	Baltimore, Maryland
15	Lorenzo Cugini	Forward	6–7	225	Sophomore	Stow, Ohio
21	Quincy Drye	Guard	6–2	190	Junior	Durham, North Carolina
22	Adam Weary	Guard	6–3	205	Sophomore	Memphis, Tennessee
23	Devante Wallace	Guard	6–5	185	Junior	Baltimore, Maryland
24	Anthony Lindauer	Guard	6–3	170	Freshman	Moline, Illinois
25	Matteo Bellusci	Guard	6–3	170	RS–Sophomore	Calgary, Alberta, Canada
35	Tré Duncan	Guard	6–0	210	Junior	Millersville, Maryland

== Schedule ==
Date time, TV	Rank^{#}	Opponent^{#}	Result	Record	Site (attendance) city, state
Exhibition
11/01/2013*; 7:00 pm		Bridgewater	W 96–53		Millis Center (1,102); High Point, North Carolina
Regular season
11/08/2013*; 7:00 pm		at UNC Greensboro	L 74–82	0–1	Greensboro Coliseum (5,734); Greensboro, North Carolina
11/12/2013*; 7:00 pm		Ferrum	W 94–64	1–1	Millis Center (1,513); High Point, North Carolina
11/16/2013*; 8:00 pm		at Eastern Kentucky	L 67–74	1–2	McBrayer Arena (5,100); Richmond, Kentucky
11/20/2013*; 7:00 pm		at William & Mary	W 80–69	2–2	Kaplan Arena (2,275); Williamsburg, Virginia
11/24/2013*; 5:00 pm		Wofford	W 66–56	3–2	Millis Center (1,202); High Point, North Carolina
12/01/2013*; 2:00 pm		Stephen F. Austin	L 68–71	3–3	Millis Center (1,003); High Point, North Carolina
12/05/2013*; 9:00 pm, FS1		at Georgetown	L 45–80	3–4	Verizon Center (4,676); Washington, D.C.
12/14/2013*; 7:00 pm		James Madison	L 69–84	3–5	Millis Center (1,439); High Point, North Carolina
12/18/2013*; 7:00 pm		at Morgan State	L 74–85	3–6	Talmadge L. Hill Field House (757); Baltimore
12/20/2013*; 7:00 pm, ESPN3		at No. 2 Syracuse	L 54–75	3–7	Carrier Dome (19,473); Syracuse, New York
12/28/2013*; 8:00 pm, ESPN3		at Arkansas	L 48–89	3–8	Bud Walton Arena (13,397); Fayetteville, Arkansas
12/30/2013*; 7:00 pm		at Wofford	L 53–81	3–9	Benjamin Johnson Arena (879); Spartanburg, South Carolina
01/03/2014*; 7:00 pm		Lees–McRae	W 85–78	4–9	Millis Center (879); High Point, North Carolina
01/08/2014; 7:00 pm		at Campbell	L 71–74	4–10 (0–1)	John W. Pope, Jr. Convocation Center (2,160); Buies Creek, North Carolina
01/10/2014; 7:00 pm, ESPNU		Radford	L 72–81	4–11 (0–2)	Millis Center (1,573); High Point, North Carolina
01/15/2014; 7:00 pm		Longwood	W 83–75	5–11 (1–2)	Millis Center (1,004); High Point, North Carolina
01/18/2014; 7:00 pm, MASN/ESPN3		at Liberty	W 76–70	6–11 (2–2)	Vines Center (5,271); Lynchburg, Virginia
01/22/2014; 7:00 pm		at VMI	L 80–82 ^{OT}	6–12 (2–3)	Cameron Hall (1,432); Lexington, Virginia
01/25/2014; 7:00 pm		UNC Asheville	W 78–67	7–12 (3–3)	Millis Center (1,412); High Point, North Carolina
01/28/2014; 7:00 pm		at Presbyterian	W 81–74	8–12 (4–3)	Templeton Physical Education Center (603); Clinton, South Carolina
02/01/2014; 7:00 pm		Winthrop	W 65–64	9–12 (5–3)	Millis Center (1,780); High Point, North Carolina
02/05/2014; 7:00 pm, ESPN3		at Coastal Carolina	W 77–74	10–12 (6–3)	HTC Center (2,639); Conway, South Carolina
02/08/2014; 7:00 pm		at Gardner–Webb	L 76–80	10–13 (6–4)	Paul Porter Arena (2,090); Boiling Springs, North Carolina
02/15/2014; 4:00 pm		at Radford	W 72–65	11–13 (7–4)	Dedmon Center (1,669); Radford, Virginia
02/17/2014; 7:00 pm		Charleston Southern; Postponed from 2/13	W 76–70	12–13 (8–4)	Millis Center (875); High Point, North Carolina
02/19/2014; 7:00 pm		Liberty	W 67–60	13–13 (9–4)	Millis Center (942); High Point, North Carolina
02/22/2014; 5:00 pm		at Longwood	W 85–59	14–13 (10–4)	Willett Hall (1,372); Farmville, Virginia
02/26/2014; 7:00 pm		VMI	W 70–67	15–13 (11–4)	Millis Center (1,241); High Point, North Carolina
02/28/2014; 7:00 pm, ESPNU		Campbell	W 56–53	16–13 (12–4)	Millis Center (1,851); High Point, North Carolina
Big South tournament
03/07/2014; 12:00 pm, ESPN3		vs. Winthrop; Quarterfinals	L 60–62	16–14	HTC Center (1,921); Conway, South Carolina
NIT
03/18/2014*; 8:15 pm, ESPN3	No. (8)	at (1) Minnesota; First round	L 81–88	16–15	Williams Arena (3,493); Minneapolis
*Non-conference game. ^{#}Rankings from AP Poll, (#) during NIT is seed within region. (#) Tournament seedings in parentheses. All times are in Eastern Time.
