= 2013–14 Coastal Carolina Chanticleers men's basketball team =

American college basketball season

2013–14 Coastal Carolina Chanticleers men's basketball

Big South South Division Champions Big South tournament champions

NCAA tournament, round of 64
- Conference: Big South Conference
- South Division
- Record: 21–13 (11–5 Big South)
- Head coach: Cliff Ellis (7th season)
- Assistant coaches: Don Hogan; Benny Moss (3rd season); Mamadou N'Diaye (3rd season); Matt Hurt
- Home arena: HTC Center

2013–14 Big South men's basketball standings
	Conf.				Overall
Team	W		L	PCT	W		L	PCT
North
High Point	12	–	4	.750	16	–	15	.516
VMI	11	–	5	.688	22	–	13	.629
Radford	10	–	6	.625	22	–	13	.629
Campbell	6	–	10	.375	12	–	20	.375
Liberty	5	–	11	.313	11	–	21	.344
Longwood	3	–	13	.188	8	–	24	.250
South
Coastal Carolina †	11	–	5	.688	21	–	13	.618
Winthrop	10	–	6	.625	20	–	13	.606
Gardner–Webb	10	–	6	.625	18	–	15	.545
UNC Asheville	10	–	6	.625	17	–	15	.531
Charleston Southern	6	–	10	.375	13	–	18	.419
Presbyterian	2	–	14	.125	6	–	26	.188
† 2014 Big South tournament winner

The 2013–14 Coastal Carolina Chanticleers men's basketball team represented Coastal Carolina University during the 2013–14 NCAA Division I men's basketball season. The Chanticleers, led by seventh year head coach Cliff Ellis, played their home games at the HTC Center and were members of the South Division of the Big South Conference. They finished the season 21–13, 11–5 in Big South play to be champions of the South Division. They were also champions of the Big South Conference tournament to earn an automatic bid to the NCAA tournament where they lost in the second round to Virginia.

== Roster ==
2013–14 Coastal Carolina Chanticleers men's basketball team
Players
Coaches

Pos.	#	Name	Height	Weight	Year	Hometown
G	0	Warren Gillis	6 ft 3 in (1.91 m)	205 lb (93 kg)	Jr	Philadelphia, Pennsylvania
G	2	Aaron Law	6 ft 2 in (1.88 m)	180 lb (82 kg)	So	Chapel Hill, North Carolina
G	3	Josh Cameron	6 ft 1 in (1.85 m)	175 lb (79 kg)	Jr	Racine, Wisconsin
G	5	Eric Smith	6 ft 0 in (1.83 m)	205 lb (93 kg)	Sr	Mullins, South Carolina
G	10	Shivaughn Wiggins	5 ft 11 in (1.8 m)	—	So	Charlotte, North Carolina
C	11	El Hadji Ndieguene	6 ft 10 in (2.08 m)	240 lb (109 kg)	Sr	Thiès, Sénégal
F	12	Michel Enanga	6 ft 5 in (1.96 m)	215 lb (98 kg)	So	Yaoundé, Cameroon
F	13	Uros Ljeskovic	6 ft 8 in (2.03 m)	240 lb (109 kg)	So	Nikšić, Montenegro
F	21	Tristian Curtis	6 ft 7 in (2.01 m)	220 lb (100 kg)	So	Nassau, Bahamas
G	22	Elijah Wilsom	6 ft 4 in (1.93 m)	205 lb (93 kg)	Fr	Wilmington, North Carolina
F	23	Badou Diagne	6 ft 7 in (2.01 m)	220 lb (100 kg)	So	Dakar, Senegal
G	30	Colton Ray-St Cyr	6 ft 5 in (1.96 m)	185 lb (84 kg)	Fr	Williamsburg, Virginia
G	33	Ron Trapps	6 ft 4 in (1.93 m)	195 lb (88 kg)	RS Fr	Lancaster, South Carolina
C	55	Kyle Buffkin	6 ft 10 in (2.08 m)	235 lb (107 kg)	Fr	Stallings, North Carolina

Head coach

- Cliff Ellis (Florida State)

Assistant coach(es)

- Don Hogan (South Alabama)
- Benny Moss (Charlotte)
- Mamadou N'Diaye (Auburn)
- Matt Hurt (Alice Lloyd)

Legend

- (C) Team captain
- (S) Suspended
- (I) Ineligible
- (W) Walk-on
- Injured
- Current redshirt

== Schedule ==
Date time, TV	Rank^{#}	Opponent^{#}	Result	Record	Site (attendance) city, state
Regular season
11/08/2013*; 8:00 pm		at Akron	L 63–72	0–1	James A. Rhodes Arena (4,217); Akron, OH
11/11/2013*; 7:00 pm		Guilford	W 76–49	1–1	HTC Center (2,122); Conway, SC
11/16/2013*; 7:00 pm		Ole Miss	L 70–72	1–2	HTC Center (3,241); Conway, SC
11/19/2013*; 7:00 pm		at Minnesota; Maui Invitational Opening Game	L 72–82	1–3	Williams Arena (10,137); Minneapolis, MN
11/23/2013*; 4:00 pm		St. Francis Brooklyn; Maui Invitational on the Mainland	W 70–59	2–3	HTC Center (1,550); Conway, SC
11/24/2013*; 2:30 pm		Louisiana–Lafayette; Maui Invitational on the Mainland	L 69–73	2–4	HTC Center (1,430); Conway, SC
11/29/2013*; 7:00 pm, ESPN3		at Clemson	L 69–73	2–5	Littlejohn Coliseum (6,735); Clemson, SC
12/04/2013*; 7:00 pm		Western Carolina	W 76–68	3–5	HTC Center (2,122); Conway, SC
12/05/2013*; 7:00 pm		NC Wesleyan	L 54–89	4–5	HTC Center (2,003); Conway, SC
12/14/2013*; 7:30 pm		Reinhardt	W 118–82	5–5	HTC Center (1,486); Conway, SC
12/17/2013*; 7:30 pm		at South Carolina State	L 78–83	5–6	SHM Memorial Center (227); Orangeburg, SC
12/21/2013*; 1:00 pm		at Central Connecticut	W 65–62	6–6	Detrick Gymnasium (1,217); New Britain, CT
12/30/2013*; 7:00 pm		South Carolina State	L 58–68	6–7	HTC Center (1,700); Conway, SC
01/03/2013*; 7:00 pm		Central Connecticut	W 86–67	7–7	HTC Center (1,520); Conway, SC
01/08/2014; 7:30 pm		at Charleston Southern	L 58–70	7–8 (0–1)	CSU Field House (912); Charleston, SC
01/11/2014; 7:00 pm		at Gardner–Webb	W 81–69	8–8 (1–1)	Paul Porter Arena (1,982); Boiling Springs, NC
01/15/2014; 7:00 pm		UNC Asheville	W 81–78	9–8 (2–1)	HTC Center (2,879); Conway, SC
01/18/2014; 7:00 pm		Winthrop	L 72–73 ^{OT}	9–9 (2–2)	HTC Center (3,179); Conway, SC
01/22/2014; 7:00 pm		at Presbyterian	W 84–72	10–9 (3–2)	Templeton Physical Education Center (1,097); Clinton, SC
01/25/2014; 2:00 pm		at Radford	W 69–61	11–9 (4–2)	Dedmon Center (2,349); Radford, VA
01/29/2014; 7:00 pm		Liberty	W 66–64	12–9 (5–2)	HTC Center (2,471); Conway, SC
02/01/2014; 4:00 pm, ESPNU		at Campbell	W 61–58	13–9 (6–2)	John W. Pope, Jr. Convocation Center (3,220); Buies Creek, NC
02/05/2014; 7:00 pm, ESPN3		High Point	L 74–77	13–10 (6–3)	HTC Center (2,639); Conway, SC
02/08/2014; 2:00 pm		Longwood	W 67–58	14–10 (7–3)	HTC Center (2,006); Conway, SC
02/12/2014; 7:00 pm		at VMI	W 83–78	15–10 (8–3)	Cameron Hall (970); Lexington, VA
02/15/2014; 7:00 pm		Gardner–Webb	W 75–60	16–10 (9–3)	HTC Center (2,123); Conway, SC
02/19/2014; 7:00 pm		at Winthrop	L 65–75	16–11 (9–4)	Winthrop Coliseum (1,762); Rock Hill, SC
02/22/2014; 2:00 pm		at UNC Asheville	L 85–100	16–12 (9–5)	Kimmel Arena (1,789); Asheville, NC
02/26/2014; 7:00 pm		Presbyterian	W 70–51	17–12 (10–5)	HTC Center (2,217); Conway, SC
03/01/2014; 2:00 pm		Charleston Southern	W 63–61	18–12 (11–5)	HTC Center (2,939); Conway, SC
Big South tournament
03/07/2014; 6:00 pm, ESPN3		Charleston Southern; Quarterfinals	W 73–68 ^{2OT}	19–12	HTC Center (3,176); Conway, SC
03/08/2014; 2:30 pm, ESPN3		VMI; Semifinals	W 66–62	20–12	HTC Center (2,892); Conway, SC
03/09/2014; 12:00 pm, ESPN2		Winthrop; Championship	W 76–61	21–12	HTC Center (3,072); Conway, SC
NCAA tournament
03/21/2014*; 9:25 pm, TBS	No. (16 E)	vs. No. 3 (1 E) Virginia; Second round	L 59–70	21–13	PNC Arena (17,472); Raleigh, NC
*Non-conference game. ^{#}Rankings from AP Poll, (#) during NCAA Tournament is seed within region E=East. (#) Tournament seedings in parentheses. All times are in Eastern Time.
