= 2014 Big South Conference men's basketball tournament =

- Classification: Division I
- Season: 2013–14
- Teams: 12
- Site: HTC Center; Conway, South Carolina
- Champions: Coastal Carolina (4th title)
- Winning coach: Cliff Ellis (1st title)
- MVP: Warren Gillis (Coastal Carolina)

2013–14 Big South men's basketball standings
	Conf.				Overall
Team	W		L	PCT	W		L	PCT
North
High Point	12	–	4	.750	16	–	15	.516
VMI	11	–	5	.688	22	–	13	.629
Radford	10	–	6	.625	22	–	13	.629
Campbell	6	–	10	.375	12	–	20	.375
Liberty	5	–	11	.313	11	–	21	.344
Longwood	3	–	13	.188	8	–	24	.250
South
Coastal Carolina †	11	–	5	.688	21	–	13	.618
Winthrop	10	–	6	.625	20	–	13	.606
Gardner–Webb	10	–	6	.625	18	–	15	.545
UNC Asheville	10	–	6	.625	17	–	15	.531
Charleston Southern	6	–	10	.375	13	–	18	.419
Presbyterian	2	–	14	.125	6	–	26	.188
† 2014 Big South tournament winner

The 2014 Big South men's basketball tournament was the postseason men's basketball tournament for the Big South Conference that took place from March 5–9, 2014, at the HTC Center in Conway, South Carolina. Both semifinal games were broadcast on ESPN3, and the championship game was televised on ESPN2.

== Format ==
All 12 teams were eligible for the tournament. Seeding was decided by divisions – the top two teams with the best overall conference records in each division received the top four seeds in the championship and first-round byes. The remaining seeds were determined based on division finish. In the event of a tie for a particular seed, the seed was determined within each division.

The #1 seeds of each division faced the winner of the game between the #4 seed from the opposite division and the #5 seed from the team's same division in the quarterfinal round. Similarly, the #2 seeds of each division faced the winner of the #3 seed from the opposite division and the #6 seed from the same division. The semifinal round featured the winner of the #1 seeds' quarterfinal games against the winner of the game featuring the #2 seeds from the opposite division.

== Seeds ==
North Division
Seed	School	Conference	Overall	Tiebreaker
1	High Point ‡	12–4	16–13	
2	VMI	11–5	18–11	
3	Radford	10–6	20–11	
4	Campbell	6–10	12–19	
5	Liberty	5–11	11–20	
6	Longwood	3–13	8–23	
South Division
Seed	School	Conference	Overall	Tiebreaker
1	Coastal Carolina ‡	11–5	18–12	
2	UNC Asheville	10–6	16–14	3–1 vs. GWU & Winthrop
3	Gardner–Webb	10–6	17–14	2–0 vs. Winthrop
4	Winthrop	10–6	17–12	
5	Charleston Southern	6–10	12–17	
6	Presbyterian	2–14	6–25	
‡ – Big South regular season division champions. Overall records are as of the end of the regular season.

== Schedule ==
Session	Game	Time*	Matchup^{#}	Television	Score
First round - Wednesday, March 5
1	1	12:00 pm	#4S Winthrop vs. #5N Liberty	BSN	77–65
1	2	2:00 pm	#3N Radford vs. #6S Presbyterian	BSN	78–73
2	3	6:00 pm	#4N Campbell vs. #5S Charleston Southern	BSN	71–81
2	4	8:00 pm	#3S Gardner–Webb vs. #6N Longwood	BSN	81–65
Quarterfinals - Friday, March 7
3	5	12:00 pm	#1N High Point vs. #4S Winthrop	ESPN3	62–60
3	6	2:00 pm	#2S UNC Asheville vs. #3N Radford	ESPN3	96–87
4	7	6:00 pm	#1S Coastal Carolina vs. #5S Charleston Southern	ESPN3	73–68
4	8	8:00 pm	#2N VMI vs. #3S Gardner–Webb	ESPN3	90–77
Semifinals - Saturday, March 8
5	9	12:00 pm	#4S Winthrop vs. #2S UNC Asheville	ESPN3	80–79
5	10	2:00 pm	#1S Coastal Carolina vs. #2N VMI	ESPN3	66–62
Championship Game - Sunday, March 9
6	11	12:00 pm	#4S Winthrop vs. #1S Coastal Carolina	ESPN2	76–61

*Game times in Eastern Time. #Rankings denote tournament seeding.

== Bracket ==
First round March 5, 2014
4S	Winthrop	77
5N	Liberty	65
3N	Radford	78
6S	Presbyterian	73
4N	Campbell	71
5S	Charleston Southern	81
3S	Gardner–Webb	81
6N	Longwood	65

Quarterfinals; March 7, 2014
1N	High Point	60
4S	Winthrop	62
2S	UNC Asheville	96
3N	Radford	87
1S	Coastal Carolina	73**
5S	Charleston Southern	68
2N	VMI	90
3S	Gardner–Webb	77

Semifinals; March 8, 2014; ESPN3
4S	Winthrop	80
2S	UNC Asheville	79
1S	Coastal Carolina	66
2N	VMI	62

Championship; March 9, 2014; ESPN2
4S	Winthrop	61
1S	Coastal Carolina	76
