= 2013–14 Campbell Fighting Camels basketball team =

American college basketball season

2013–14 Campbell Fighting Camels basketball
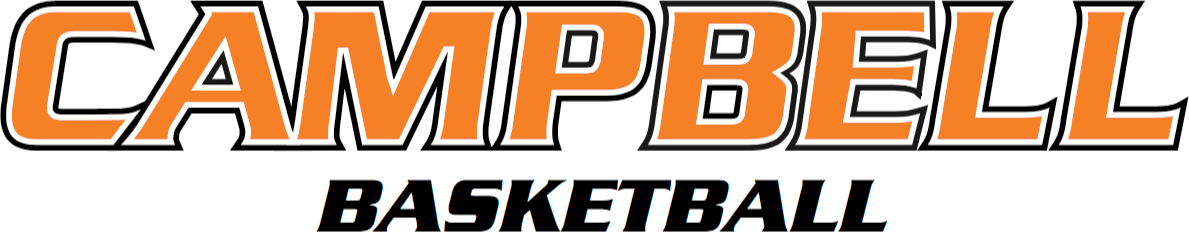
- Conference: Big South Conference
- North Division
- Record: 12–20 (6–10 Big South)
- Head coach: Kevin McGeehan (1st season)
- Assistant coaches: Peter Thomas; Chris Clark; Dan Geriot
- Home arena: Gore Arena

2013–14 Big South men's basketball standings
	Conf.				Overall
Team	W		L	PCT	W		L	PCT
North
High Point	12	–	4	.750	16	–	15	.516
VMI	11	–	5	.688	22	–	13	.629
Radford	10	–	6	.625	22	–	13	.629
Campbell	6	–	10	.375	12	–	20	.375
Liberty	5	–	11	.313	11	–	21	.344
Longwood	3	–	13	.188	8	–	24	.250
South
Coastal Carolina †	11	–	5	.688	21	–	13	.618
Winthrop	10	–	6	.625	20	–	13	.606
Gardner–Webb	10	–	6	.625	18	–	15	.545
UNC Asheville	10	–	6	.625	17	–	15	.531
Charleston Southern	6	–	10	.375	13	–	18	.419
Presbyterian	2	–	14	.125	6	–	26	.188
† 2014 Big South tournament winner

The 2013–14 Campbell Fighting Camels basketball team represented Campbell University during the 2013–14 NCAA Division I men's basketball season. The Fighting Camels were led by new head coach Kevin McGeehan and played their home games at Gore Arena. They were members of the North Division of the Big South Conference. They finished the season 12–20, 6–10 in Big South play to finish in fourth place in the North Division. They lost in the first round of the Big South tournament to Charleston Southern.

== Roster ==
Number	Name	Position	Height	Weight	Year	Hometown
0	Antwon Oliver	Forward	6–6	185	RS Senior	Racine, Wisconsin
1	Luke Moyer	Guard	6–0	170	Sophomore	Souderton, Pennsylvania
2	Rod Days	Forward	6–6	170	Junior	Miami Gardens, Florida
3	Casey Perrin	Guard	5–9	160	Sophomore	Scottsdale, Arizona
5	Quinton Ray	Guard	6–1	180	Freshman	Angier, North Carolina
10	Leek Leek	Forward	6–6	215	Senior	Khartoum, Sudan
11	Jordan Faciane	Guard	6–4	210	Sophomore	Ellenwood, Georgia
15	Marvelle Harris	Forward	6–6	215	Senior	Macon, Georgia
20	Andrew Ryan	Guard	6–5	200	Redshirt Junior	Lynden, Washington
22	Darius Leonard	Forward	6–9	225	Redshirt Junior	Raleigh, North Carolina
24	Kyre' Hamer	Guard	6–3	195	Freshman	Stone Mountain, Georgia
25	Reco McCarter	Guard/Forward	6–6	195	Redshirt Junior	Goldsboro, North Carolina
35	D.J. Mason	Forward	6–6	215	Sophomore	Clarkton, North Carolina
41	Antonio Kalpic	Forward	6–9	220	Redshirt Senior	Šibenik, Croatia

== Schedule ==
Date time, TV	Opponent	Result	Record	Site (attendance) city, state
Regular season
11/08/2013*; 7:00 pm	Shenandoah	W 87–62	1–0	Gore Arena (1,934); Buies Creek, North Carolina
11/12/2013*; 8:00 pm	at Appalachian State; Global Sports Hoops Showcase	W 73–66	2–0	Holmes Center (1,482); Boone, North Carolina
11/16/2013*; 7:00 pm, ESPN3	at NC State; Global Sports Hoops Showcase	L 66–81	2–1	PNC Arena (13,143); Raleigh, North Carolina
11/18/2013*; 7:00 pm	North Carolina Central; Global Sports Hoops Showcase	L 43–62	2–2	Gore Arena (2,110); Buies Creek, North Carolina
11/20/2013*; 7:00 pm, ESPN3	at Cincinnati; Global Sports Hoops Showcase	L 62–81	2–3	Fifth Third Arena (6,011); Cincinnati
11/27/2013*; 12:00 pm	Saint Andrews	W 62–55	3–3	Gore Arena (523); Buies Creek, North Carolina
11/30/2013*; 7:00 pm	at Georgia Southern	W 75–73 ^{OT}	4–3	Hanner Fieldhouse (517); Statesboro, Georgia
12/03/2013*; 7:00 pm	at UNC Wilmington	L 50–69	4–4	Trask Coliseum (3,007); Wilmington, North Carolina
12/10/2013*; 7:00 pm	Chowan	L 65–67 ^{OT}	4–5	Gore Arena (718); Buies Creek, North Carolina
12/13/2013*; 8:05 pm	Loyola–Chicago	L 68–80	4–6	Joseph J. Gentile Arena (1,103); Chicago
12/18/2013*; 7:00 pm	at Robert Morris	L 61–72	4–7	Charles L. Sewall Center (516); Moon Township, Pennsylvania
12/21/2013*; 2:00 pm	Johnson & Wales	W 95–64	5–7	Gore Arena (619); Buies Creek, North Carolina
12/30/2013*; 7:00 pm	Georgia Southern	W 69–63	6–7	Gore Arena (1,270); Buies Creek, North Carolina
01/02/2014*; 7:00 pm	East Carolina	L 71–79	6–8	Gore Arena (2,865); Buies Creek, North Carolina
01/04/2014*; 7:00 pm	Delaware State	L 60–70	6–9	Gore Arena (1,120); Buies Creek, North Carolina
01/08/2013; 7:00 pm	High Point	W 74–71	7–9 (1–0)	Gore Arena (2,160); Buies Creek, North Carolina
01/11/2014; 5:00 pm	at Longwood	W 75–67	8–9 (2–0)	Willett Hall (632); Farmville, Virginia
01/14/2014; 7:00 pm	at Liberty	L 68–71	8–10 (2–1)	Vines Center (1,942); Lynchburg, Virginia
01/18/2014; 2:00 pm	VMI	W 97–93 ^{OT}	9–10 (3–1)	Gore Arena (N/A); Buies Creek, North Carolina
01/22/2014; 7:00 pm	Radford	W 65–63	10–10 (4–1)	Gore Arena (1,847); Buies Creek, North Carolina
01/25/2014; 7:00 pm	at Gardner–Webb	L 48–66	10–11 (4–2)	Paul Porter Arena (2,230); Boiling Springs, North Carolina
01/29/2014; 7:00 pm	Charleston Southern	W 65–57	11–11 (5–2)	Gore Arena (2,012); Buies Creek, North Carolina
02/01/2014; 4:00 pm, ESPNU	Coastal Carolina	L 58–61	11–12 (5–3)	Gore Arena (3,220); Buies Creek, North Carolina
02/05/2014; 7:00 pm	at UNC Asheville	L 73–86	11–13 (5–4)	Kimmel Arena (1,657); Asheville, North Carolina
02/08/2014; 4:00 pm	at Winthrop	L 62–88	11–14 (5–5)	Winthrop Coliseum (2,569); Rock Hill, South Carolina
02/12/2014; 7:00 pm	Presbyterian	W 77–66	12–14 (6–5)	Gore Arena (1,249); Buies Creek, North Carolina
02/15/2014; 7:00 pm	Longwood	L 53–76	12–15 (6–6)	Gore Arena (1,930); Buies Creek, North Carolina
02/19/2013; 7:00 pm	at VMI	L 81–84	12–16 (6–7)	Cameron Hall (2,371); Lexington, Virginia
02/22/2014; 7:00 pm	Liberty	L 59–79	12–17 (6–8)	Gore Arena (2,440); Buies Creek, North Carolina
02/26/2014; 7:00 pm	at Radford	L 78–82	12–18 (6–9)	Dedmon Center (1,672); Radford, Virginia
02/28/2014; 7:00 pm, ESPNU	at High Point	L 53–56	12–19 (6–10)	Millis Center (1,851); High Point, North Carolina
Big South tournament
03/05/2014; 6:00 pm	vs. Charleston Southern; First Round	L 71–81	12–20	HTC Center (1,648); Conway, South Carolina
*Non-conference game. ^{#}Rankings from AP Poll. (#) Tournament seedings in parentheses. All times are in Eastern Time.
