= 2013–14 Liberty Flames basketball team =

American college basketball season

2013–14 Liberty Flames men's basketball
- Conference: Big South Conference
- North Division
- Record: 11–21 (5–11 Big South)
- Head coach: Dale Layer (5th season)
- Assistant coaches: Brian Joyce; Omar Mance; Vince Walden
- Home arena: Vines Center

2013–14 Big South men's basketball standings
	Conf.				Overall
Team	W		L	PCT	W		L	PCT
North
High Point	12	–	4	.750	16	–	15	.516
VMI	11	–	5	.688	22	–	13	.629
Radford	10	–	6	.625	22	–	13	.629
Campbell	6	–	10	.375	12	–	20	.375
Liberty	5	–	11	.313	11	–	21	.344
Longwood	3	–	13	.188	8	–	24	.250
South
Coastal Carolina †	11	–	5	.688	21	–	13	.618
Winthrop	10	–	6	.625	20	–	13	.606
Gardner–Webb	10	–	6	.625	18	–	15	.545
UNC Asheville	10	–	6	.625	17	–	15	.531
Charleston Southern	6	–	10	.375	13	–	18	.419
Presbyterian	2	–	14	.125	6	–	26	.188
† 2014 Big South tournament winner

The 2013–14 Liberty Flames basketball team represented Liberty University during the 2013–14 NCAA Division I men's basketball season. The Flames, led by fifth year head coach Dale Layer, played their home games at the Vines Center as members of the North Division of the Big South Conference. They finished the season 11–21, 5–11 in Big South play to finish in fifth place in the North Division. They lost in the first round of the Big South tournament to Winthrop.

== Roster ==
Number	Name	Position	Height	Weight	Year	Hometown
0	Devon Pakas	Guard	6–4	185	Freshman	Hawley, Minnesota
1	Davon Marshall	Guard	5–11	170	Senior	Niagara Falls, New York
3	Casey Roberts	Guard	6–3	190	Senior	LaVale, Maryland
4	Wesley Alcegaire	Forward	6–5	185	RS Freshman	Miami, Florida
5	Ryan Kemrite	Guard	6–4	200	Freshman	Conroe, Texas
10	Chad Donley	Guard	6–2	175	RS Junior	Baker, Florida
11	Andrew Smith	Forward	6–9	220	Junior	Pompano Beach, Florida
12	Tomasz Gielo	Forward	6–9	220	Junior	Szczecin, Poland
15	Ethan Layer	Guard	6–1	160	RS Sophomore	Forest, Virginia
21	Joel Vander Pol	Center	6–10	230	RS Senior	Fort Myers, Florida
23	Joe Retic	Guard	6–3	190	Sophomore	Indianapolis, Indiana
24	Antwan Burrus	Forward	6–6	235	RS Senior	Winterville, North Carolina
32	JR Coronado	Forward	6–8	245	Senior	Caracas, Venezuela
33	John Caleb Sanders	Guard	6–0	180	Senior	Sugar Land, Texas
42	Sommy Ogukwe	Forward	6–7	230	RS Junior	Abuja, Nigeria

== Schedule and results ==
Date time, TV	Opponent	Result	Record	Site (attendance) city, state
Non-conference games
11/8/2013*; 8:00 pm	Randolph	W 74–53	1–0	Vines Center (7,043); Lynchburg, VA
11/12/2013*; 7:00 pm	at William & Mary	L 72–84	1–1	William & Mary Hall (2,250); Williamsburg, VA
11/16/2013*; 7:30 pm	Western Carolina	L 63–68	1–2	Vines Center (2,596); Lynchburg, VA
11/16/2013*; 7:30 pm	UNC Wilmington	L 76–87	1–3	Vines Center (1,731); Lynchburg, VA
11/23/2013*; 4:00 pm, ESPN3	at Virginia; Corpus Christi Challenge	L 53–75	1–4	John Paul Jones Arena (10,941); Charlottesville, VA
11/26/2013*; 8:05 pm	at Missouri State; Corpus Christi Challenge	L 52–54	1–5	JQH Arena (3,898); Springfield, MO
11/29/2013*; 2:00 pm	vs. Hampton; Corpus Christi Challenge	W 70–53	2–5	American Bank Center (N/A); Corpus Christi, TX
11/30/2013*; 3:30 pm	vs. Sam Houston State; Corpus Christi Challenge	W 62–58	3–5	American Bank Center (N/A); Corpus Christi, TX
12/7/2013*; 7:00 pm	Greensboro	W 84–47	4–5	Vines Center (1,597); Lynchburg, VA
12/14/2013*; 8:00 pm	at Austin Peay	L 71–77	4–6	Dunn Center (2,022); Clarksville, TN
12/17/2013*; 7:00 pm, ESPN3	Howard	W 77–59	5–6	Vines Center (1,100); Lynchburg, VA
12/20/2013*; 7:00 pm, ESPN3	at Furman	L 83–86	5–7	Timmons Arena (865); Greenville, SC
12/28/2013*; 5:30 pm, ESPN3	Southeastern (FL)	W 92–53	6–7	Vines Center (1,319); Lynchburg, VA
1/1/2014*; 3:00 pm	at Delaware	L 64–77	6–8	Bob Carpenter Center (2,058); Newark, DE
1/4/2014*; 2:00 pm	Princeton	L 74–80	6–9	Vines Center (1,484); Lynchburg, VA
Conference games
1/8/2014; 7:00 pm	at Radford	L 63–72	6–10 (0–1)	Dedmon Center (N/A); Radford, VA
1/11/2014; 1:00 pm	at VMI	W 85–80	7–10 (1–1)	Cameron Hall (1,567); Lexington, VA
1/14/2014; 7:00 pm	Campbell	W 71–68	8–10 (2–1)	Vines Center (1,942); Lynchburg, VA
1/18/2014; 7:00 pm, MASN/ESPN3	High Point	L 70–76	8–11 (2–2)	Vines Center (5,271); Lynchburg, VA
1/22/2014; 7:00 pm	at Longwood	L 66–69	8–12 (2–3)	Willett Hall (1,619); Farmville, VA
1/25/2014; 7:00 pm	Presbyterian	W 65–53	9–12 (3–3)	Vines Center (2,624); Lynchburg, VA
1/29/2014; 7:00 pm	at Coastal Carolina	L 64–66	9–13 (3–4)	HTC Center (2,471); Conway, SC
2/1/2014; 5:30 pm, ESPN3	at Charleston Southern	L 66–80	9–14 (3–5)	CSU Field House (840); North Charleston, SC
2/4/2014; 7:00 pm	Winthrop	L 62–73	9–15 (3–6)	Vines Center (1,615); Lynchburg, VA
2/8/2014; 2:00 pm	at UNC Asheville	L 72–75	9–16 (3–7)	Kimmel Arena (2,456); Asheville, NC
2/11/2014; 7:00 pm	Gardner–Webb	L 52–68	9–17 (3–8)	Vines Center (1,645); Lynchburg, VA
2/15/2014; 7:00 pm	VMI	L 70–77	9–18 (3–9)	Vines Center (2,595); Lynchburg, VA
2/19/2014; 7:00 pm	at High Point	L 60–67	9–19 (3–10)	Millis Athletic Convocation Center (942); High Point, NC
2/22/2014; 4:00 pm, ESPN3	at Campbell	W 79–59	10–19 (4–10)	John W. Pope, Jr. Convocation Center (2,440); Buies Creek, NC
2/25/2014; 7:00 pm	Longwood	W 90–76	11–19 (5–10)	Vines Center (2,072); Lynchburg, VA
3/1/2014; 4:30 pm	Radford	L 83–87	11–20 (5–11)	Vines Center (2,524); Lynchburg, VA
Big South tournament
03/5/2014; 12:00 pm	vs. Winthrop; First Round	L 65–77	11–21	HTC Center (1,448); Conway, SC
*Non-conference game. ^{#}Rankings from AP Poll. (#) Tournament seedings in parentheses. All times are in Eastern.

== See also ==
- 2013–14 NCAA Division I men's basketball season
- 2013–14 NCAA Division I men's basketball rankings
