= Scott Cherry =

American basketball coach (born 1971)

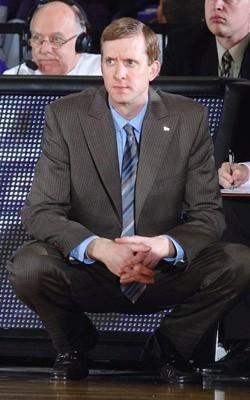
- Cherry in 2013

Current position
- Title: Assistant coach
- Team: Lipscomb
- Conference: Atlantic Sun

Biographical details
- Born: February 18, 1971 (age 55); Saratoga Springs, New York, U.S.

Playing career
- 1989–1993: North Carolina

Coaching career (HC unless noted)
- 1997–1998: Bishop McGuinness HS (asst.)
- 1998–1999: Middle Tennessee State (women's asst.)
- 1999–2002: George Mason (asst.)
- 2002–2003: Tennessee Tech (asst.)
- 2003–2007: George Mason (asst.)
- 2007–2008: Western Kentucky (asst.)
- 2008–2009: South Carolina (asst.)
- 2009–2018: High Point
- 2021–2023: Jacksonville (asst.)
- 2023–2025: Central Michigan (asst.)
- 2025–present: Lipscomb (asst.)

Head coaching record
- Overall: 146–134 (.521)

Accomplishments and honors

Championships
- 4 Big South regular season (2013–2016); 2 Big South North Division (2013, 2014)

Awards
- Big South Coach of the Year (2014)

Scott Douglas Cherry (born February 18, 1971) is an American college basketball coach and the former head men's basketball coach at High Point University. He replaced Bart Lundy in 2009. Cherry is a native of Ballston Spa, New York.

== High school career ==
Cherry played for the Saratoga Central Catholic High School Saints in Saratoga Springs, New York. He played under coach Bob King who is widely considered Spa Catholic's greatest basketball coach of all time. University of North Carolina basketball head coach Dean Smith visited the Spa Catholic gym to sign Cherry in 1988.

== College career ==
Cherry played for the University of North Carolina Tar Heels basketball team under Dean Smith from 1989 to 1993. He was a senior captain on the Tar Heel team that won the 1993 NCAA Tournament.

== Pre-coaching career ==
Following his college career, Cherry played one season for AEL in Limassol, Cyprus. He then returned to the U.S. and subsequently became a forklift salesman for three years.

== Coaching career ==
=== Early Coaching ===
Cherry began his coaching career in 1997 as an assistant coach at Bishop McGuinness (NC) High School. He then spent one season as a women's basketball assistant coach at Middle Tennessee State.

In 1999, he began the first of two stints as an assistant to Jim Larranaga at George Mason. He left the Patriots in 2002 and spent one year as an assistant at Tennessee Tech. He returned to George Mason in 2003 and participated in the Patriots 2006 run to the Final Four.

In 2007, he joined the staff of Darrin Horn as an assistant at Western Kentucky. Cherry followed Horn to South Carolina for the 2008–09 season. He was named the head coach of High Point on March 26, 2009.

=== High Point ===
Cherry was hired as High Point Men's Basketball Coach on March 26, 2009. His first season in High Point, HPU finished 15–15, a 6-game winning improvement for the previous season. The next season in High Point, Cherry lead his team to a 12–19 record, and a semi-final spot in the Big South tournament, something High Point hadn't accomplished in 3 years. Cherry finished the 11–12 season with a 13–18 record, and High Point ranked 6th in the NCAA in three-point percentage. The next season, High Point played non-conference games at Wake Forest (L 60–71) and Eastern Kentucky (L 70–73). The Panthers finished 17–14, and won the Big South north division, earning them a spot in the 2013 CollegeInsider.com Postseason Tournament, this was the schools first postseason appearance since becoming an NCAA division one school. Cherry was given a 3-year contract extension running through the 16–17 season. Cherry again led the Panthers to a Big South north division championship, and the outright regular season championship, another program first. The Panthers were invited to the 2014 National Invitation Tournament, losing in the first round to Richard Pitino's Minnesota's team. Cherry led High Point to the best start in school history in 2014–15 campaign, starting the season 14–3. High Point lost in the quarterfinals of the conference tournament, but received a bid to play in the 2015 CollegeInsider.com Postseason Tournament. The Panthers earned their first postseason D1 victory with a 70–64 win over Maryland Eastern Shore. Cherry become the winningest coach in the D1 era, passing Bart Lundy, in a 93–69 win over NC Wesleyan on Nov 15, 2015. It was Cherry's 97th win at High Point.

On March 7, 2018, Cherry and High Point mutually agreed to part ways.

== Head coaching record ==
Record table
Season	Team	Overall	Conference	Standing	Postseason
High Point Panthers (Big South Conference) (2009–2018)
2009–10	High Point	15–15	10–8	T–5th	
2010–11	High Point	12–19	7–11	T–7th	
2011–12	High Point	13–18	8–10	T–6th	
2012–13	High Point	17–14	12–4	1st (North)	CIT First Round
2013–14	High Point	16–15	12–4	1st (North)	NIT First Round
2014–15	High Point	23–10	13–5	T–1st	CIT Second Round
2015–16	High Point	21–11	13–5	T–1st	NIT First Round
2016–17	High Point	15–16	9–9	5th	
2017–18	High Point	14–16	9–9	T–5th	
High Point:		146–134 (.521)	92–65 (.586)		
Total:		146–134 (.521)			
National champion Postseason invitational champion Conference regular season champion Conference regular season and conference tournament champion Division regular season champion Division regular season and conference tournament champion Conference tournament champion
