= Templeton Physical Education Center =

Arena in Clinton, South Carolina

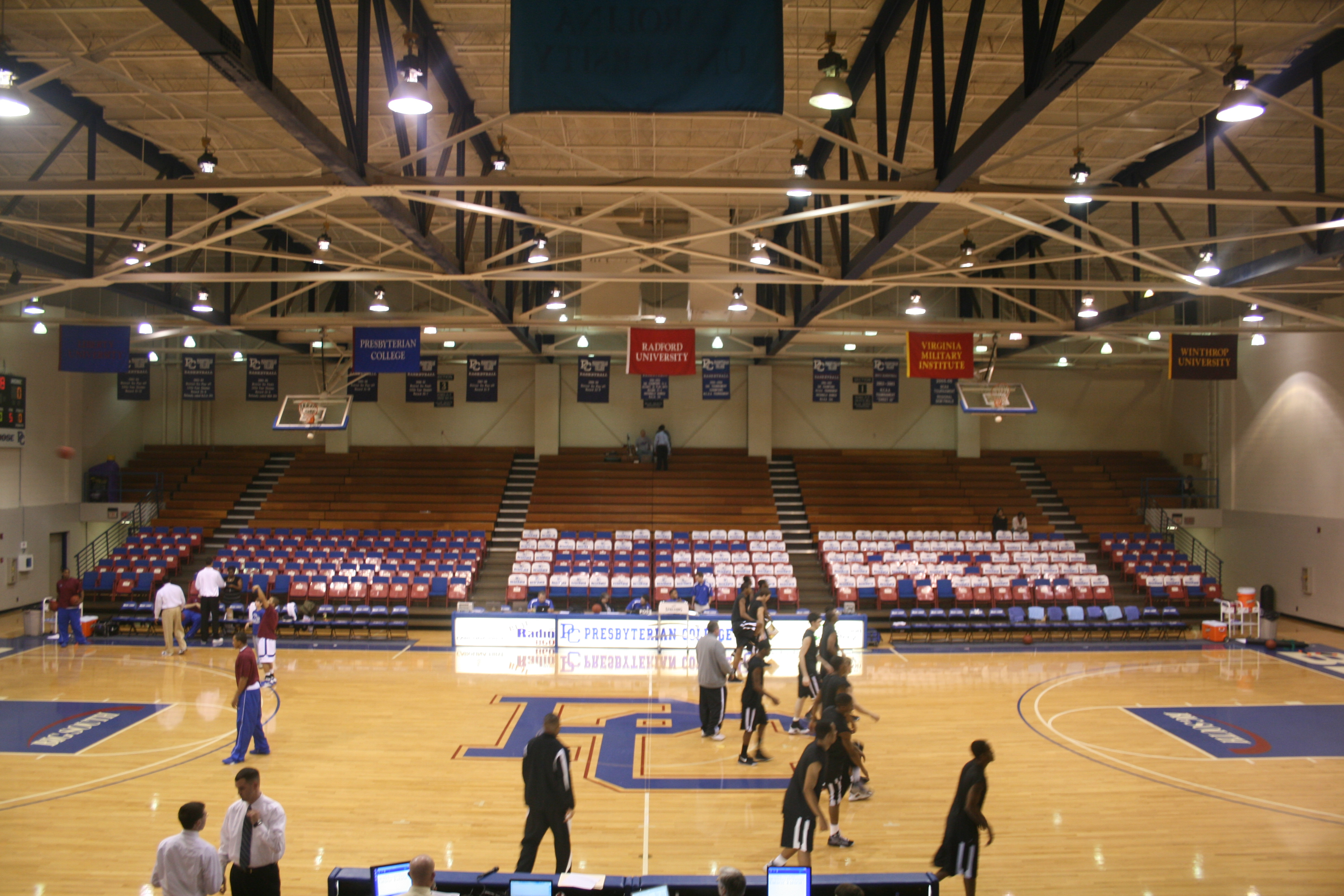
- Interactive map of Templeton Physical Education Center
- Location: 503 South Broad Street; Clinton, South Carolina 29325
- Coordinates: 34.465°N 81.869°W
- Owner: Presbyterian College
- Operator: Presbyterian College
- Capacity: 2,300

Construction
- Opened: 1975

Tenants
- Presbyterian men's and women's basketball Presbyterian women's volleyball Presbyterian men's and women's wrestling

The Ross E. Templeton Physical Education Center is a 2,300-seat multi-purpose arena in Clinton, South Carolina. It was built in 1975 and is home to the Presbyterian College Blue Hose men's and women's basketball, volleyball, and wrestling teams. The center bears the name of the late Ross E. Templeton. The basketball court was named after Furman B. Pinson Jr., a 1933 graduate of Presbyterian College who played football, basketball, and track.

== See also ==
- List of NCAA Division I basketball arenas
