= Nibert =

Nibert is a surname. Notable people with the surname include:

- David Nibert (born 1953), American sociologist, author, and professor
- Greg Nibert (born 1958), American politician
- Gregg Nibert (born 1957), American basketball coach
