= 2014–15 Big South Conference men's basketball season =

2014–15 Big South Men's Basketball Season
- League: NCAA Division I
- Sport: Basketball
- Teams: 11
- TV partner(s): ESPN, MASN, ASN

Regular Season
- Season champions: Charleston Southern
- Season MVP: Saah Nimley
- Top scorer: Saah Nimley

Tournament
- Champions: Coastal Carolina
- Runners-up: Winthrop
- Finals MVP: Elijah Wilson

Basketball seasons
- ← 13–14 15–16 →

2014–15 Big South men's basketball standings
	Conf.				Overall
Team	W		L	PCT	W		L	PCT
Charleston Southern	13	–	5	.722	19	–	12	.613
High Point	13	–	5	.722	23	–	10	.697
Coastal Carolina †	12	–	6	.667	24	–	10	.706
Radford	12	–	6	.667	22	–	12	.647
Winthrop	12	–	6	.667	19	–	13	.594
UNC Asheville	10	–	8	.556	15	–	16	.484
Gardner–Webb	10	–	8	.556	20	–	15	.571
Presbyterian	6	–	12	.333	10	–	22	.313
Longwood	5	–	13	.278	11	–	23	.324
Campbell	4	–	14	.222	10	–	22	.313
Liberty	2	–	16	.111	8	–	24	.250
† 2015 Big South tournament winner

The 2014–15 Big South Conference men's basketball season began on November 14, 2014, and concluded in March with the 2015 Big South Conference men's basketball tournament played at the HTC Center in Conway, South Carolina.

It was the Big South's 30th season of men's basketball. The league was reduced to eleven members for the first time since 2011–12 with the loss of VMI to the Southern Conference. Because of this, the Big South dropped the divisional format it utilized the previous two seasons, and played an eighteen-game conference schedule, as opposed to sixteen the year prior.

== Awards and honors ==
- Player of the Year: Saah Nimley, Charleston Southern
- Freshman of the Year: DeSean Murray, Presbyterian
- Defense Player of the Year: Javonte Green, Radford
- Coach of the Year: Barclay Radebaugh, Charleston Southern
- Scholar-Athlete of the Year: Giacomo Zilli, UNC Asheville

=== All–Big South Teams ===
==== First Team ====
Name	School	Pos.	Year
Saah Nimley	Charleston Southern	G	Senior
John Brown	High Point	F	R–Junior
Jerome Hill	Gardner–Webb	F	Junior
Javonte Green	Radford	F	Senior
Keon Moore	Winthrop	G	R–Senior.

==== Second Team ====
Name	School	Pos.	Year
Warren Gillis	Coastal Carolina	F	Junior
Andrew Rowsey	UNC Asheville	G	Sophomore
Tyler Strange	Gardner–Webb	G	Senior
Will Saunders	Charleston Southern	F	Senior
Quincy Taylor	Longwood	G	R–Senior

==== Honorable Mention ====
Name	School	Pos.	Year
Arlon Harper	Charleston Southern	G	Senior
R. J. Price	Radford	G	Senior
Jordan Downing	Presbyterian	G	R–Senior
DeSean Murray	Presbyterian	F	Freshman
Josh Cameron	Coastal Carolina	G	Senior

==== All-Freshman ====
Name	School	Pos.
DeSean Murray	Presbyterian	F
Xavier Cooks	Winthrop	F
Kevin Vannatta	UNC Asheville	G
Ryan Badowski	Longwood	G
Curtis Phillips	Campbell	F

==== All-Academic ====
Name	School	Pos.	Year
Paul Gombwer	Charleston Southern	F	Junior
Andrew Ryan	Campbell	G	R–Senior
Tristan Curtis	Coastal Carolina	F	Junior
Haiishen McIntyre	High Point	G	Sophomore
Tyrell Nelson	Gardner–Webb	C	Sophomore
Ethan Layer	Liberty	G	R–Junior
Damarion Geter	Longwood	F	Sophomore
Kyle Noreen	Radford	F	Senior
Giacomo Zilli	UNC Asheville	F	Sophomore
Derrick Henry	Winthrop	G	R–Junior

== Postseason ==
=== Big South tournament ===
2015 Big South Men's Basketball Tournament Seeds and Results
Seed	School	Conference	Overall	Tiebreaker	First round March 5	Quarterfinals March 7	Semifinals March 8	Championship March 9
1	Charleston Southern ‡	13–5	19–10	2–2 vs. Coastal, Radford	BYE	#9 Longwood		
2	High Point	13–5	22–8	0–4 vs. Coastal, Radford	BYE	#7 Gardner–Webb		
3	Coastal Carolina	12–6	21–9	2–0 vs. HPU, 1–0 vs. Radford	BYE	#6 UNC Asheville	#7 Gardner–Webb	#5 Winthrop
4	Radford	12–6	21–10	2–0 vs. High Point	BYE	#5 Winthrop		
5	Winthrop	12–6	17–12	0–2 vs. High Point	BYE	#4 Radford	#9 Longwood	#3 Coastal Carolina
6	UNC Asheville	10–8	14–15	2–0 vs. GWU	#11 Liberty	#3 Coastal Carolina		
7	Gardner–Webb	10–8	18–13	0–2 vs. UNCA	#10 Campbell	#2 High Point	#3 Coastal Carolina	
8	Presbyterian	6–12	10–21		#9 Longwood			
9	Longwood	5–13	9–22		#8 Presbyterian	#1 Charleston Southern	#5 Winthrop	
10	Campbell	4–14	10–21		#7 Gardner–Webb			
11	Liberty	2–16	8–23		#6 UNC Asheville			
‡ – Big South regular season champions. Overall records are as of the end of the regular season.

==== Bracket ====
First round Wednesday, March 4
8	Presbyterian	61
9	Longwood	65
7	Gardner–Webb	72
10	Campbell	64
6	UNC–Asheville	80
11	Liberty	70

Quarterfinals; Friday, March 6
1	Charleston Southern	60
9	Longwood	68
4	Radford	66
5	Winthrop	67
2	High Point	71
7	Gardner–Webb	72
3	Coastal Carolina	74
6	UNC-Asheville	57

Semifinals; Saturday, March 7
5	Winthrop	71
9	Longwood	58
3	Coastal Carolina	73
7	Gardner-Webb	70

Championship; Sunday, March 8
3	Coastal Carolina	81
5	Winthrop	70

=== NCAA tournament ===
Seed	Region	School	Second round	Third round	Sweet 16	Elite Eight	Final Four	Championship
16	West	Coastal Carolina	L Wisconsin 86–72					
		1 bid	0–1 .000	0–0 –	0–0 –	0–0 –	0–0 –	TOTAL: 0–1 .000

=== National Invitation tournament ===
Seed	Bracket	School	First round	Second round	Quarterfinals	Semifinals	Championship
8	Old Dominion	Charleston Southern	L Old Dominion 65–56				
		1 bid	0–1 .000	0–0 –	0–0 –	0–0 –	TOTAL: 0–1 .000

=== College Basketball Invitational ===
Seed	Bracket	School	First round	Quarterfinals	Semifinals	Championship
		Gardner–Webb	L Colorado 78–87			
		Radford	W Delaware State 78–57	L Vermont 71–78		
		2 bids	1–1 .500	0–1 .000	0–0 –	TOTAL: 1–2 .333

=== CollegeInsider.com tournament ===
Seed	Bracket	School	First round	Second round	Quarterfinals	Semifinals	Championship
		High Point	W Maryland Eastern Shore 70–67	L Eastern Kentucky 65–66			
		1 bid	1–0 1.000	0–1 .000	0–0 –	0–0 –	TOTAL: 1–1 .500

== Head coaches ==
Kevin McGeehan, Campbell
Barclay Radebaugh, Charleston Southern
Cliff Ellis, Coastal Carolina
Tim Craft, Gardner–Webb
Scott Cherry, High Point
Dale Layer, Liberty

Jayson Gee, Longwood
Gregg Nibert, Presbyterian
Mike Jones, Radford
Nick McDevitt, UNC Asheville
Pat Kelsey, Winthrop
