= 2014–15 Presbyterian Blue Hose men's basketball team =

American college basketball season

2014–15 Presbyterian Blue Hose men's basketball
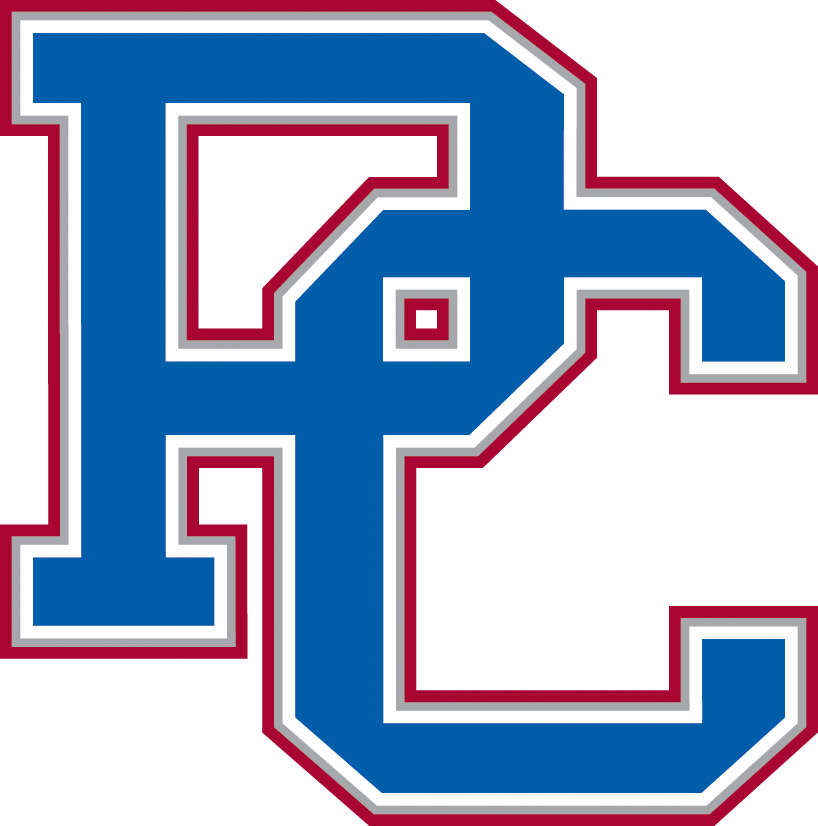
- Conference: Big South Conference
- Record: 10–22 (6–12 Big South)
- Head coach: Gregg Nibert (26th season)
- Assistant coaches: Peirre Miller; John Reynolds; Steve Roberts
- Home arena: Templeton Physical Education Center

2014–15 Big South men's basketball standings
	Conf.				Overall
Team	W		L	PCT	W		L	PCT
Charleston Southern	13	–	5	.722	19	–	12	.613
High Point	13	–	5	.722	23	–	10	.697
Coastal Carolina †	12	–	6	.667	24	–	10	.706
Radford	12	–	6	.667	22	–	12	.647
Winthrop	12	–	6	.667	19	–	13	.594
UNC Asheville	10	–	8	.556	15	–	16	.484
Gardner–Webb	10	–	8	.556	20	–	15	.571
Presbyterian	6	–	12	.333	10	–	22	.313
Longwood	5	–	13	.278	11	–	23	.324
Campbell	4	–	14	.222	10	–	22	.313
Liberty	2	–	16	.111	8	–	24	.250
† 2015 Big South tournament winner

The 2014–15 Presbyterian Blue Hose men's basketball team represented Presbyterian College during the 2014–15 NCAA Division I men's basketball season. The Blue Hose, led by 26th year head coach Gregg Nibert, played their home games at the Templeton Physical Education Center and were members of the Big South Conference. They finished the season 10–22, 6–12 in Big South play to finish in eighth place. They lost in the first round of the Big South tournament to Longwood.

== Roster ==
Number	Name	Position	Height	Weight	Year	Hometown
0	Jaron Withers	Guard	6–4	200	Freshman	Winston-Salem, North Carolina
2	Markus Terry	Guard	6–2	200	Sophomore	Johns Creek, Georgia
3	DeSean Murray	Forward	6–5	210	Freshman	Stanley, North Carolina
4	Austin Anderson	Guard	6–5	172	Junior	Piedmont, South Carolina
10	Janeil Jenkins	Guard	5–10	170	Junior	Jacksonville, Florida
12	Stephen Osu	Center	6–9	260	Freshman	Herndon, Virginia
14	Reggie Dillard	Guard	6–4	220	Sophomore	Greensboro, North Carolina
15	William Truss	Center	6–8	265	Senior	Vestavia Hills, Alabama
21	Jordan Downing	Guard	6–5	205	Senior	Huntersville, North Carolina
23	Ruben Arroyo-Felix	Forward	6–8	200	Freshman	Patillas, Puerto Rico
24	Will Adams	Guard	5–10	180	Sophomore	Johnson City, Tennessee
33	Charlie Inclan	Guard	5–10	165	Sophomore	Spartanburg, South Carolina
34	Ed Drew	Forward	6–5	215	Sophomore	Suffolk, Virginia
44	Jake Campbell	Center	7–0	235	Sophomore	Centerville, Ohio

== Schedule ==
Date time, TV	Opponent	Result	Record	Site (attendance) city, state
Regular season
11/14/2014*; 6:00 pm, ESPNU	at No. 4 Duke; Coaches vs. Cancer Classic	L 44–113	0–1	Cameron Indoor Stadium (9,314); Durmah, NC
11/18/2014*; 7:30 pm	Piedmont	W 82–72	1–1	Templeton Center (482); Clinton, SC
11/21/2014*; 10:00 pm	vs. American; Coaches vs. Cancer Classic	L 38–63	1–2	Thomas Assembly Center (2,937); Ruston, LA
11/22/2014*; 9:30 pm	vs. Morehead State; Coaches vs. Cancer Classic	L 49–69	1–3	Thomas Assembly Center (2,868); Ruston, LA
11/23/2014*; 4:00 pm, ASN	at Louisiana Tech; Coaches vs. Cancer Classic	L 48–76	1–4	Thomas Assembly Center (2,854); Ruston, LA
11/25/2014*; 7:00 pm	Toccoa Falls	W 63–40	2–4	Templeton Center (521); Clinton, SC
11/29/2014*; 4:30 pm	Bob Jones	W 88–39	3–4	Templeton Center (271); Clinton, SC
12/03/2014*; 7:00 pm	at Wofford	L 45–66	3–5	Benjamin Johnson Arena (1,222); Spartanburg, SC
12/06/2014*; 7:00 pm	UNC Greensboro	L 53–55	3–6	Templeton Center (305); Clinton, SC
12/13/2014*; 2:00 pm	Montreat	W 79–68	4–6	Templeton Center (203); Clinton, SC
12/16/2014*; 7:00 pm	Samford	L 71–81	4–7	Templeton Center (218); Clinton, SC
12/20/2014*; 4:00 pm	at UT Martin	L 60–77	4–8	Skyhawk Arena (1,139); Martin, TN
12/27/2014*; 7:00 pm, ESPN3	at Virginia Tech	L 65–87	4–9	Cassell Coliseum (3,420); Blacksburg, VA
12/31/2014; 6:00 pm	Gardner–Webb	L 64–81	4–10 (0–1)	Templeton Center (980); Clinton, SC
01/03/2015; 7:00 pm	at Liberty	W 62–58	5–10 (1–1)	Vines Center (1,512); Lynchburg, VA
01/08/2015; 7:30 pm	Winthrop	L 56–57	5–11 (1–2)	Templeton Center (882); Clinton, SC
01/10/2015; 4:00 pm	at Radford	L 82–95	5–12 (1–3)	Dedmon Center (1,066); Radford, VA
01/14/2015; 7:00 pm	at Longwood	W 71–67	6–12 (2–3)	Willett Hall (1,612); Farmville, VA
01/17/2015; 7:30 pm	Charleston Southern	L 65–73	6–13 (2–4)	Templeton Center (1,050); Clinton, SC
01/22/2015; 7:00 pm	Campbell	W 72–70	7–13 (3–4)	Templeton Center (627); Clinton, SC
01/24/2015; 4:00 pm	at Coastal Carolina	L 52–63	7–14 (3–5)	HTC Center (2,531); Conway, SC
01/26/2015; 7:00 pm	High Point	L 54–63	7–15 (3–6)	Templeton Center (410); Clinton, SC
01/31/2015; 7:00 pm	Longwood	L 67–71	7–16 (3–7)	Templeton Center (1,532); Clinton, SC
02/03/2015; 7:00 pm	at Campbell	L 53–66	7–17 (3–8)	Gore Arena (1,453); Buies Creek, NC
02/06/2015; 7:00 pm	Liberty	W 69–61	8–17 (4–8)	Templeton Center (N/A); Clinton, SC
02/12/2015; 7:00 pm	at UNC Asheville	W 69–65	9–17 (5–8)	Kimmel Arena (1,109); Asheville, NC
02/14/2015; 7:30 pm	Radford	L 56–62	9–18 (5–9)	Templeton Center (610); Clinton, SC
02/18/2015; 7:30 pm	at Charleston Southern	L 49–75	9–19 (5–10)	CSU Field House (915); Charleston, SC
02/21/2015; 7:00 pm	at High Point	L 58–67	9–20 (5–11)	Millis Center (N/A); High Point, NC
02/26/2015; 7:00 pm	Coastal Carolina	W 80–69	10–20 (6–11)	Templeton Center (622); Clinton, SC
02/28/2015; 1:00 pm	at Winthrop	L 53–80	10–21 (6–12)	Winthrop Coliseum (1,496); Rock Hill, SC
Big South tournament
03/04/2015; 12:00 pm	vs. Longwood; First round	L 61–65	10–22	HTC Center (1,337); Conway, SC
*Non-conference game. ^{#}Rankings from AP Poll. (#) Tournament seedings in parentheses. All times are in Eastern Time.
