= 2014–15 Coastal Carolina Chanticleers men's basketball team =

American college basketball season

2014–15 Coastal Carolina Chanticleers men's basketball

Big South tournament champions

NCAA tournament, round of 64
- Conference: Big South Conference
- Record: 24–10 (12–6 Big South)
- Head coach: Cliff Ellis (8th season)
- Assistant coaches: Don Hogan; Benny Moss; Stacey Palmore; Matt Hurt
- Home arena: HTC Center

2014–15 Big South men's basketball standings
	Conf.				Overall
Team	W		L	PCT	W		L	PCT
Charleston Southern	13	–	5	.722	19	–	12	.613
High Point	13	–	5	.722	23	–	10	.697
Coastal Carolina †	12	–	6	.667	24	–	10	.706
Radford	12	–	6	.667	22	–	12	.647
Winthrop	12	–	6	.667	19	–	13	.594
UNC Asheville	10	–	8	.556	15	–	16	.484
Gardner–Webb	10	–	8	.556	20	–	15	.571
Presbyterian	6	–	12	.333	10	–	22	.313
Longwood	5	–	13	.278	11	–	23	.324
Campbell	4	–	14	.222	10	–	22	.313
Liberty	2	–	16	.111	8	–	24	.250
† 2015 Big South tournament winner

The 2014–15 Coastal Carolina Chanticleers men's basketball team represented Coastal Carolina University during the 2014–15 NCAA Division I men's basketball season. The Chanticleers, led by eighth year head coach Cliff Ellis, played their home games at the HTC Center and were members of the Big South Conference. They finished the season 24–10, 12–6 in Big South play to finish in a three-way tie for third place. They defeated UNC Asheville, Gardner–Webb, and Winthrop to become champions of the Big South tournament. They earned an automatic bid to the NCAA tournament where they lost in the first round to Wisconsin.

== Roster ==
2014–15 Coastal Carolina Chanticleers men's basketball team
Players
Coaches

Pos.	#	Name	Height	Weight	Year	Hometown
G	0	Warren Gillis	6 ft 3 in (1.91 m)	205 lb (93 kg)	Sr	Philadelphia
G	2	Aaron Law	6 ft 0 in (1.83 m)	180 lb (82 kg)	Jr	Chapel Hill, North Carolina
G	3	Josh Cameron	6 ft 1 in (1.85 m)	175 lb (79 kg)	Sr	Racine, Wisconsin
G	5	Jaylen Shaw	6 ft 0 in (1.83 m)	182 lb (83 kg)	So	Hartsville, South Carolina
G	10	Shivaughn Wiggins	5 ft 11 in (1.8 m)	180 lb (82 kg)	So	Charlotte, North Carolina
F	12	Michel Enanga	6 ft 5 in (1.96 m)	215 lb (98 kg)	Jr	Yaoundé, Cameroon
F	13	Uros Ljeskovic	6 ft 8 in (2.03 m)	240 lb (109 kg)	Jr	Nikšić, Montenegro
F	21	Tristian Curtis	6 ft 7 in (2.01 m)	220 lb (100 kg)	Jr	Nassau, Bahamas
G	22	Elijah Wilson	6 ft 4 in (1.93 m)	205 lb (93 kg)	So	Wilmington, North Carolina
F	23	Badou Diagne	6 ft 7 in (2.01 m)	220 lb (100 kg)	Jr	Dakar, Senegal
G	30	Colton Ray-St Cyr	6 ft 5 in (1.96 m)	185 lb (84 kg)	So	Williamsburg, Virginia
G	33	Ron Trapps	6 ft 4 in (1.93 m)	195 lb (88 kg)	RS So	Lancaster, South Carolina
C	55	Kyle Buffkin	6 ft 10 in (2.08 m)	235 lb (107 kg)	So	Stallings, North Carolina

Head coach

- Cliff Ellis (Florida State)

Assistant coach(es)

- Don Hogan (South Alabama)
- Benny Moss (Charlotte)
- Stacey Palmore (Livingstone)
- Matt Hurt (Alice Lloyd)

Legend

- (C) Team captain
- (S) Suspended
- (I) Ineligible
- (W) Walk-on
- Injured
- Current redshirt

== Schedule ==
Date time, TV	Rank^{#}	Opponent^{#}	Result	Record	Site (attendance) city, state
Regular season
11/14/2014*; 7:30 pm		Trinity Baptist	W 79–36	1–0	HTC Center (2,764); Conway, South Carolina
11/16/2014*; 10:00 pm, P12N		at UCLA; Battle 4 Atlantis	L 71–84	1–1	Pauley Pavilion (5,389); Los Angeles
11/18/2014*; 7:00 pm		Columbia International	W 82–51	2–1	HTC Center (1,679); Conway, South Carolina
11/22/2014*; 6:00 pm		Piedmont International	W 76–33	3–1	HTC Center (1,502); Conway, South Carolina
11/26/2014*; 2:30 pm		vs. Louisiana–Monroe; Battle 4 Atlantis	W 61–48	4–1	McKenzie Arena (2,426); Chattanooga, Tennessee
11/27/2014*; 2:30 pm		vs. Chattanooga; Battle 4 Atlantis	L 67–78	4–2	McKenzie Arena (2,136); Chattanooga, Tennessee
12/02/2014*; 7:00 pm		South Carolina State	W 66–52	5–2	HTC Center (1,910); Conway, South Carolina
12/05/2014*; 8:00 pm, FSN		at Auburn	W 58–54	6–2	Auburn Arena (7,964); Auburn, Alabama
12/11/2014*; 7:00 pm		Warren Wilson	W 85–40	7–2	HTC Center (1,550); Conway, South Carolina
12/14/2014*; 3:00 pm		at South Carolina State	W 57–43	8–2	SHM Memorial Center (207); Orangeburg, South Carolina
12/18/2014*; 8:00 pm, SECN		at Ole Miss	L 68–71	8–3	Tad Smith Coliseum (6,490); Oxford, Mississippi
12/21/2014*; 1:00 pm		at Central Arkansas	W 72–55	9–3	Farris Center (335); Conway, Arkansas
12/31/2014; 7:00 pm		at High Point	W 83–68	10–3 (1–0)	Millis Center (1,561); High Point, North Carolina
01/03/2015; 2:00 pm		Charleston Southern	W 83–74	11–3 (2–0)	HTC Center (2,431); Conway, South Carolina
01/08/2015; 7:30 pm		Longwood	W 76–70	12–3 (3–0)	HTC Center (1,824); Conway, South Carolina
01/10/2015; 7:00 pm		at Liberty	W 69–54	13–3 (4–0)	Vines Center (2,231); Lynchburg, Virginia
01/12/2015; 7:00 pm		at Campbell	W 70–67	14–3 (5–0)	Gore Arena (1,516); Buies Creek, North Carolina
01/17/2015; 4:30 pm		Gardner–Webb	L 67–82	14–4 (5–1)	HTC Center (2,465); Conway, South Carolina
01/22/2015; 7:00 pm, ESPNU		at UNC Asheville	L 65–75	14–5 (5–2)	Kimmel Arena (2,263); Asheville, North Carolina
01/24/2015; 4:00 pm		Presbyterian	W 63–52	15–5 (6–2)	HTC Center (2,531); Conway, South Carolina
01/28/2015; 7:00 pm		Winthrop	L 68–75	15–6 (6–3)	HTC Center (2,839); Conway, South Carolina
01/31/2015; 4:00 pm		at Gardner–Webb	L 64–66	15–7 (6–4)	Paul Porter Arena (1,635); Boiling Springs, North Carolina
02/03/2015; 7:00 pm		UNC Asheville	W 68–56	16–7 (7–4)	HTC Center (2,451); Conway, South Carolina
02/06/2015; 9:00 pm, ESPNU		High Point	W 65–60	17–7 (8–4)	HTC Center (2,566); Conway, South Carolina
02/11/2015; 7:30 pm		at Charleston Southern	L 72–83	17–8 (8–5)	CSU Field House (919); Charleston, South Carolina
02/14/2015; 3:30 pm		Liberty	W 96–56	18–8 (9–5)	HTC Center (2,184); Conway, South Carolina
02/16/2015; 7:00 pm		at Radford	W 65–59	19–8 (10–5)	Dedmon Center (913); Radford, Virginia
02/19/2015; 7:00 pm		Campbell	W 81–57	20–8 (11–5)	HTC Center (2,361); Conway, South Carolina
02/23/2015; 7:00 pm		at Longwood	W 72–59	21–8 (12–5)	Willett Hall (1,342); Farmville, Virginia
02/26/2015; 7:00 pm		at Presbyterian	L 69–80	21–9 (12–6)	Templeton Center (622); Clinton, South Carolina
Big South tournament
03/06/2015; 8:30 pm, ESPN3		UNC Asheville; Quarterfinals	W 74–57	22–9	HTC Center (3,275); Conway, South Carolina
03/07/2015; 2:35 pm, ESPN3		Gardner–Webb; Semifinals	W 73–70	23–9	HTC Center (3,275); Conway, South Carolina
03/08/2015; 12:30 pm, ESPN2		Winthrop; Championship game	W 81–70	24–9	HTC Center (2,957); Conway, South Carolina
NCAA tournament
03/20/2015*; 9:20 pm, TBS	(16 W)	vs. (1 W) No. 3 Wisconsin; First round	L 72–86	24–10	CenturyLink Center Omaha (17,534); Omaha, Nebraska
*Non-conference game. ^{#}Rankings from AP Poll. (#) Tournament seedings in parentheses. W=West Region. All times are in Eastern Time.
