= 2014–15 Liberty Flames basketball team =

American college basketball season

2014–15 Liberty Flames men's basketball
- Conference: Big South Conference
- Record: 8–24 (2–16 Big South)
- Head coach: Dale Layer (6th season)
- Assistant coaches: Brian Joyce; Omar Mance; Vince Walden
- Home arena: Vines Center

2014–15 Big South men's basketball standings
	Conf.				Overall
Team	W		L	PCT	W		L	PCT
Charleston Southern	13	–	5	.722	19	–	12	.613
High Point	13	–	5	.722	23	–	10	.697
Coastal Carolina †	12	–	6	.667	24	–	10	.706
Radford	12	–	6	.667	22	–	12	.647
Winthrop	12	–	6	.667	19	–	13	.594
UNC Asheville	10	–	8	.556	15	–	16	.484
Gardner–Webb	10	–	8	.556	20	–	15	.571
Presbyterian	6	–	12	.333	10	–	22	.313
Longwood	5	–	13	.278	11	–	23	.324
Campbell	4	–	14	.222	10	–	22	.313
Liberty	2	–	16	.111	8	–	24	.250
† 2015 Big South tournament winner

The 2014–15 Liberty Flames basketball team represented Liberty University during the 2014–15 NCAA Division I men's basketball season. The Flames, led by sixth year head coach Dale Layer, played their home games at the Vines Center as members of the Big South Conference. They finished the season 8–24, 2–16 in Big South play to finish in last place. They lost in the first round of the Big South tournament to UNC Asheville.

At the end of the season, head coach Dale Layer was fired. He had a record of 82–113 and one NCAA tournament appearance in six seasons.

== Roster ==
Number	Name	Position	Height	Weight	Year	Hometown
0	David Andoh	Forward	6–7	220	Junior	Montreal, Quebec, Canada
1	Jordan Dembley	Guard	6–1	175	Freshman	Minneapolis
2	A.C. Reid	Guard/Forward	6–5	190	Freshman	Spring Branch, Texas
3	Calvin Hoffman	Guard	6–0	165	Freshman	Anchorage, Alaska
5	Ryan Kemrite	Guard/Forward	6–4	200	RS–Freshman	Conroe, Texas
11	Andrew Smith	Forward	6–9	220	Senior	Pompano Beach, Florida
12	Tomasz Gielo	Forward	6–9	220	Senior	Szczecin, Poland
13	James Johnson	Forward	6–10	245	RS–Senior	San Diego, California
14	Theo Johnson	Guard/Forward	6–7	205	Junior	Sacramento, California
15	Ethan Layer	Guard	6–1	160	RS–Junior	Forest, Virginia
23	Joe Retic	Guard	6–3	190	Junior	Indianapolis
24	Ezra Talbert	Forward	6–8	190	Freshman	Olathe, Kansas
31	Peter Moller	Guard	6–3	185	Freshman	Værløse, Denmark
32	Evan Maxwell	Center	6–10	245	Freshman	Scranton, Pennsylvania

== Schedule and results ==
Date time, TV	Opponent	Result	Record	Site (attendance) city, state
Regular season
11/14/2014*; 8:30 pm	Randolph	W 69–45	1–0	Vines Center (4,352); Lynchburg, Virginia
11/17/2014*; 7:00 pm	Delaware	W 61–55	2–0	Vines Center (1,897); Lynchburg, Virginia
11/19/2014*; 7:00 pm, ESPN3	at Virginia Tech; Cancún Challenge	W 73–63	2–1	Cassell Coliseum (5,586); Blacksburg, Virginia
11/22/2014*; 3:30 pm	at Miami (OH); Cancún Challenge	L 52–63	2–2	Millett Hall (1,058); Oxford, Ohio
11/25/2014*; 4:00 pm	vs. North Florida; Cancún Challenge Mayan Division semifinals	L 57–77	2–3	Hard Rock Hotel Riviera Maya (560); Cancún, MX
11/26/2014*; 1:30 pm	vs. Morgan State; Cancún Challenge Mayan Division 3rd place game	L 50–51	2–4	Hard Rock Hotel Riviera Maya (540); Cancún, MX
12/01/2014*; 7:00 pm, ESPN3	Furman	W 66–52	3–4	Vines Center (1,630); Lynchburg, Virginia
12/06/2014*; 2:00 pm, ESPN3	St. Francis Brooklyn	L 54–65	3–5	Vines Center (1,025); Lynchburg, Virginia
12/13/2014*; 2:00 pm	Bluefield	W 79–61	4–5	Vines Center (1,207); Lynchburg, Virginia
12/17/2014*; 7:30 pm	UNC Wilmington	L 70–73	4–6	Trask Coliseum (3,028); Wilmington, North Carolina
12/19/2014*; 7:00 pm	Central Penn	W 94–65	5–6	Vines Center (1,268); Lynchburg, Virginia
12/22/2014*; 7:00 pm	at Princeton	L 47–65	5–7	Jadwin Gymnasium (1,819); Princeton, New Jersey
12/28/2014*; 2:00 pm	Cincinnati Christian	W 78–58	6–7	Vines Center (1,137); Lynchburg, Virginia
12/31/2014; 2:00 pm	at Campbell	L 46–53	6–8 (0–1)	Gore Arena (1,175); Buies Creek, North Carolina
01/03/2015; 7:00 pm	Presbyterian	W 62–58	6–9 (0–2)	Vines Center (1,512); Lynchburg, Virginia
01/08/2015; 7:00 pm	at UNC Asheville	L 54–71	6–10 (0–3)	Kimmel Arena (1,255); Asheville, North Carolina
01/10/2015; 7:30 pm	Coastal Carolina	L 54–69	6–11 (0–4)	Vines Center (2,231); Lynchburg, Virginia
01/14/2015; 7:30 pm	at Charleston Southern	L 58–80	6–12 (0–5)	CSU Field House (808); Charleston, South Carolina
01/17/2015; 5:00 pm	at Longwood	L 71–85	6–13 (0–6)	Willett Hall (1,761); Farmville, Virginia
01/22/2015; 7:00 pm, ESPN3	Winthrop	L 56–71	6–14 (0–7)	Vines Center (1,795); Lynchburg, Virginia
01/24/2015; 4:30 pm, ESPN3	at Radford	L 76–84	6–15 (0–8)	Dedmon Center (2,948); Radford, Virginia
01/29/2015; 7:00 pm, ESPN3	High Point	L 53–72	6–16 (0–9)	Vines Center (1,939); Lynchburg, Virginia
01/31/2015; 7:00 pm, ESPN3	Charleston Southern	L 62–74	6–17 (0–10)	Vines Center (2,191); Lynchburg, Virginia
02/04/2015; 7:00 pm, ESPN3	at Winthrop	L 61–74	6–18 (0–11)	Winthrop Coliseum (1,053); Rock Hill, South Carolina
02/06/2015; 7:00 pm	at Presbyterian	L 61–69	6–19 (0–12)	Templeton Center (N/A); Clinton, South Carolina
02/10/2015; 7:00 pm	Campbell	W 73–60	7–19 (1–12)	Vines Center (1,385); Lynchburg, Virginia
02/14/2015; 3:30 pm	at Coastal Carolina	L 56–96	7–20 (1–13)	HTC Center (2,184); Conway, South Carolina
02/17/2015; 7:00 pm	Longwood	L 72–78	7–21 (1–14)	Vines Center (844); Lynchburg, Virginia
02/21/2015; 7:00 pm	at Gardner–Webb	L 67–77	7–22 (1–15)	Paul Porter Arena (1,384); Boiling Springs, North Carolina
02/26/2015; 7:00 pm, ESPN3	Radford	W 80–69	8–22 (2–15)	Vines Center (1,646); Lynchburg, Virginia
02/28/2015; 3:00 pm, ESPN3	UNC Asheville	L 77–95	8–23 (2–16)	Vines Center (2,478); Lynchburg, Virginia
Big South tournament
03/04/2015; 6:00 pm	vs. UNC Asheville; First round	L 70–80	8–24	HTC Center (1,046); Conway, South Carolina
*Non-conference game. ^{#}Rankings from AP Poll. (#) Tournament seedings in parentheses. All times are in Eastern.
