= 2014–15 Winthrop Eagles men's basketball team =

American college basketball season

2014–15 Winthrop Eagles men's basketball
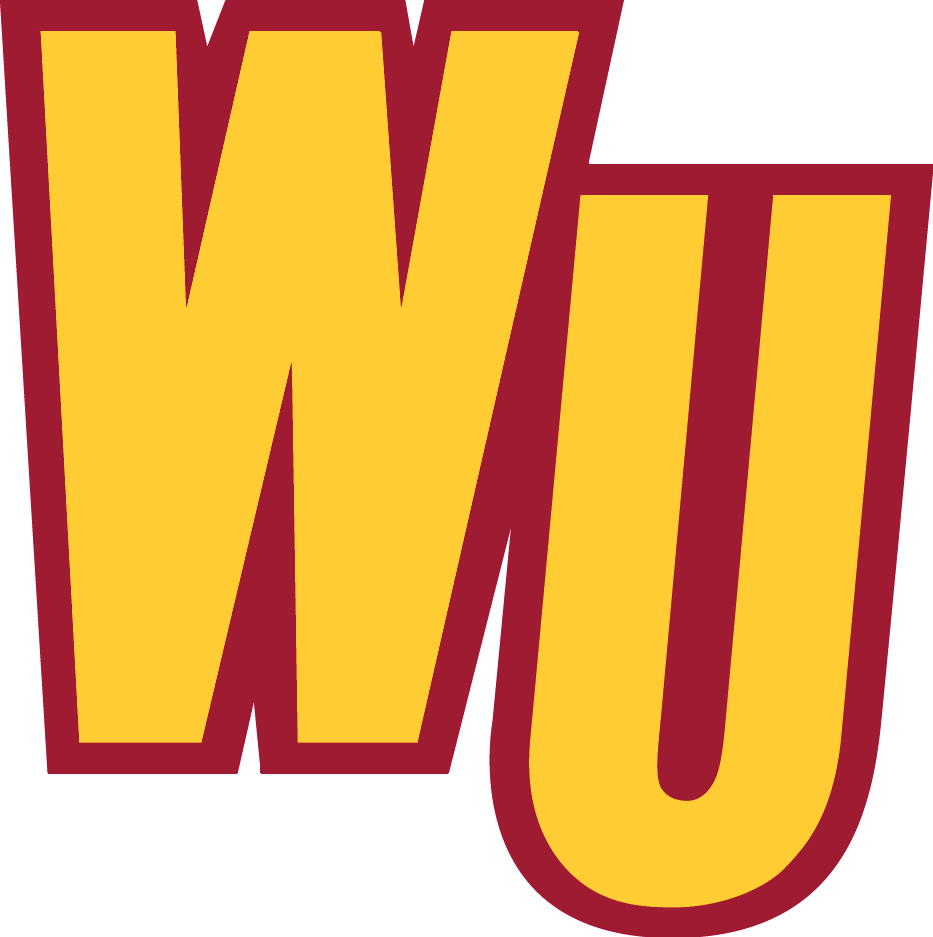
- Conference: Big South Conference
- Record: 19–13 (12–6 Big South)
- Head coach: Pat Kelsey (3rd season)
- Assistant coaches: Mark Prosser; Marty McGillan; Brian Kloman
- Home arena: Winthrop Coliseum

2014–15 Big South men's basketball standings
	Conf.				Overall
Team	W		L	PCT	W		L	PCT
Charleston Southern	13	–	5	.722	19	–	12	.613
High Point	13	–	5	.722	23	–	10	.697
Coastal Carolina †	12	–	6	.667	24	–	10	.706
Radford	12	–	6	.667	22	–	12	.647
Winthrop	12	–	6	.667	19	–	13	.594
UNC Asheville	10	–	8	.556	15	–	16	.484
Gardner–Webb	10	–	8	.556	20	–	15	.571
Presbyterian	6	–	12	.333	10	–	22	.313
Longwood	5	–	13	.278	11	–	23	.324
Campbell	4	–	14	.222	10	–	22	.313
Liberty	2	–	16	.111	8	–	24	.250
† 2015 Big South tournament winner

The 2014–15 Winthrop Eagles men's basketball team represented Winthrop University during the 2014–15 NCAA Division I men's basketball season. The Eagles, led by third year head coach Pat Kelsey, played their home games at the Winthrop Coliseum and were members of the Big South Conference. They finished the season 19–13, 12–6 in Big South play to finish in a three-way tie for third place. They advanced to the conference championship game of the Big South tournament where they lost to Coastal Carolina. Despite going to the championship game of their conference tournament, the Eagles didn't play in a postseason tournament.

== Roster ==
Number	Name	Position	Height	Weight	Year	Hometown
0	Duby Okeke	Center	6–8	230	Freshman	Jonesboro, Georgia
1	Roderick Perkins	Forward	6–5	185	Junior	Smyrna, Georgia
4	Mitch Hill	Forward	6–4	200	Freshman	Cincinnati, Ohio
5	Keon Johnson	Guard	5–7	160	Sophomore	Mansfield, Ohio
10	Keon Moore	Guard	6–5	190	Senior	Windsor, North Carolina
11	Andre Smith	Guard	5–10	170	Senior	Tampa, Florida
12	Xavier Cooks	Guard/Forward	6–8	185	Freshman	Wollongong, New South Wales, Australia
14	James Bourne	Forward	6–8	240	Senior	Alexandria, Virginia
15	Derrick Henry	Guard	6–3	200	Junior	Covington, Georgia
21	Joseph Lopez	Forward	6–6	225	Freshman	Miami, Florida
23	Larry Brown	Forward	6–6	210	Senior	Red Springs, North Carolina
25	Zach Price	Center	6–10	250	Junior	Louisville, Kentucky
31	Tevin Prescott	Forward	6–5	180	Junior	Hartsville, South Carolina
32	Freddy Poole	Forward	6–7	240	Freshman	Columbia, South Carolina
33	Hunter Sadlon	Guard	6–0	168	Sophomore	Cincinnati, Ohio
35	Jarad Scott	Forward	6–8	215	Sophomore	Lumberton, North Carolina
42	Josh Davenport	Forward	6–5	200	Sophomore	Cincinnati, Ohio

== Schedule ==
Date time, TV	Opponent	Result	Record	Site (attendance) city, state
Regular season
11/15/2014*; 4:00 pm	Pfeiffer	W 82–59	1–0	Winthrop Coliseum (2,328); Rock Hill, SC
11/17/2014*; 7:00 pm, ESPN3	at Clemson	W 77–74	2–0	Littlejohn Coliseum (5,960); Clemson, SC
11/20/2014*; 8:15 pm	at Savannah State	L 58–59	2–1	Tiger Arena (3,010); Savannah, GA
11/24/2014*; 7:00 pm	East Tennessee State	L 64–69	2–2	Winthrop Coliseum (1,498); Rock Hill, SC
12/01/2014*; 7:00 pm	Savannah State	W 68–47	3–2	Winthrop Coliseum (804); Rock Hill, SC
12/03/2014*; 8:00 pm	at Jacksonville State	L 76–79 ^{OT}	3–3	Pete Mathews Coliseum (1,433); Jacksonville, AL
12/06/2014*; 2:00 pm	at No. 21 Maryland	L 62–82	3–4	Xfinity Center (9,345); College Park, MD
12/09/2014*; 7:00 pm	Mars Hill	W 96–51	4–4	Winthrop Coliseum (924); Rock Hill, SC
12/17/2014*; 9:00 pm	at Auburn	L 62–80	4–5	Auburn Arena (5,323); Auburn, AL
12/19/2014*; 8:00 pm	at Southeastern Louisiana	L 71–81	4–6	University Center (515); Hammond, LA
12/21/2014*; 2:00 pm	Reinhardt	W 100–72	5–6	Winthrop Coliseum (526); Rock Hill, SC
12/31/2014; 1:00 pm	Longwood	W 82–72 ^{OT}	6–6 (1–0)	Winthrop Coliseum (1,074); Rock Hill, SC
01/03/2015; 1:00 pm	High Point	L 87–90	6–7 (1–1)	Winthrop Coliseum (891); Rock Hill, SC
01/08/2015; 7:30 pm	at Presbyterian	W 57–56	7–7 (2–1)	Templeton Center (882); Clinton, SC
01/10/2015; 7:00 pm, ESPN3	at Gardner–Webb	L 64–65	7–8 (2–2)	Paul Porter Arena (1,354); Boiling Springs, NC
01/14/2015; 7:00 pm	at UNC Asheville	W 84–69	8–8 (3–2)	Kimmel Arena (1,238); Asheville, NC
01/17/2015; 1:00 pm	Radford	L 77–85	8–9 (3–3)	Winthrop Coliseum (973); Rock Hill, SC
01/22/2015; 7:00 pm, ESPN3	at Liberty	W 71–56	9–9 (4–3)	Vines Center (1,795); Lynchburg, VA
01/24/2015; 1:00 pm	Campbell	W 71–63	10–9 (5–3)	Winthrop Coliseum (2,804); Rock Hill, SC
01/28/2015; 7:00 pm	at Coastal Carolina	W 75–68	11–9 (6–3)	HTC Center (2,839); Conway, SC
01/31/2015; 4:00 pm	at Radford	L 66–73	11–10 (6–4)	Dedmon Center (3,046); Radford, VA
02/02/2015; 8:00 pm	Charleston Southern	W 77–55	12–10 (7–4)	Winthrop Coliseum (774); Rock Hill, SC
02/04/2015; 7:00 pm, ESPN3	Liberty	W 74–61	13–10 (8–4)	Winthrop Coliseum (1,053); Rock Hill, SC
02/11/2015; 7:00 pm	at High Point	L 72–73	13–11 (8–5)	Millis Center (1,750); High Point, NC
02/14/2015; 1:00 pm	Gardner–Webb	W 71–68	14–11 (9–5)	Winthrop Coliseum (1,149); Rock Hill, SC
02/18/2015; 7:00 pm	UNC Asheville	W 91–70	15–11 (10–5)	Winthrop Coliseum (1,049); Rock Hill, SC
02/21/2015; 5:00 pm	at Longwood	W 83–59	16–11 (11–5)	Willett Hall (1,421); Farmville, VA
02/26/2015; 7:00 pm	at Campbell	L 50–65	16–12 (11–6)	Gore Arena (1,045); Buies Creek, NC
02/28/2015; 1:00 pm	Presbyterian	W 80–53	17–12 (12–6)	Winthrop Coliseum (1,496); Rock Hill, SC
Big South tournament
03/06/2015; 2:30 pm, ESPN3	vs. Radford; Quarterfinals	W 67–66	18–12	HTC Center (1,773); Conway, SC
03/07/2015; 12:00 pm, ESPN3	vs. Longwood; Semifinals	W 71–58	19–12	HTC Center (2,765); Conway, SC
03/08/2015; 2:30 pm, ESPN2	at Coastal Carolina; Championship game	L 70–81	19–13	HTC Center (2,957); Conway, SC
*Non-conference game. ^{#}Rankings from AP Poll. (#) Tournament seedings in parentheses. All times are in Eastern Time.
