= 2014–15 Clemson Tigers men's basketball team =

American college basketball season

2014–15 Clemson Tigers men's basketball
- Conference: Atlantic Coast Conference
- Record: 16–15 (8–10 ACC)
- Head coach: Brad Brownell (5th season)
- Assistant coaches: Mike Winiecki; Richie Riley; Steve Smith
- Home arena: Littlejohn Coliseum

2014–15 ACC men's basketball standings
	Conf.				Overall
Team	W		L	PCT	W		L	PCT
No. 6 Virginia	16	–	2	.889	30	–	4	.882
No. 4 Duke	15	–	3	.833	35	–	4	.897
No. 8 Notre Dame †	14	–	4	.778	32	–	6	.842
No. 15 North Carolina	11	–	7	.611	26	–	12	.684
Miami (FL)	10	–	8	.556	25	–	13	.658
NC State	10	–	8	.556	22	–	14	.611
Syracuse	9	–	9	.500	18	–	13	.581
Clemson	8	–	10	.444	16	–	15	.516
Florida State	8	–	10	.444	17	–	16	.515
Pittsburgh	8	–	10	.444	19	–	15	.559
Wake Forest	5	–	13	.278	13	–	19	.406
Boston College	4	–	14	.222	13	–	19	.406
Georgia Tech	3	–	15	.167	12	–	19	.387
Virginia Tech	2	–	16	.111	11	–	22	.333
No. 17 Louisville*	0	–	6	.000	0	–	8	.000
† ACC tournament winner Rankings from AP poll *Louisville: 24 reg. season games, 4 postseason games vacated due to sanctions against the program; Disputed Record-(27-9)(12-6)

The 2014–15 Clemson Tigers men's basketball team represented Clemson University during the 2014–15 NCAA Division I men's basketball season. Led by fifth year head coach Brad Brownell, the Tigers played their home games at Littlejohn Coliseum as members of the Atlantic Coast Conference. They finished the season 16–15, 8–10 in ACC play to finish in a three way tie for sixth place. They lost in the second round of the ACC tournament to Florida State.

== Last season ==
The Tigers finished the season 23–13, 10–8 in ACC play to finish in sixth place. They advanced to the quarterfinals of the ACC tournament where they lost to Duke. They received an invitation to the National Invitation Tournament where they defeated Georgia State, Illinois and Belmont to advance to the semifinals where they lost to SMU.

=== Departures ===
Name	Number	Pos.	Height	Weight	Year	Hometown	Notes
Adonis Filer	3	G	6'2"	190	Sophomore	Chicago, IL	Transferred to Florida Atlantic
Devin Coleman	15	G	6'2"	205	RS Sophomore	Philadelphia, PA	Transferred to Temple
K. J. McDaniels	32	F	6'6"	200	Junior	Birmingham, AL	Declared for the 2014 NBA draft
Ibrahim Djambo	42	F	6'10"	215	Junior	Bamako, Mali	Transferred to Hofstra

== Recruiting class ==
College recruiting information
Name	Hometown	School	Height	Weight	Commit date
Donte Grantham; SF	Martinsburg, WV	Hargrave Military Academy	6 ft 7 in (2.01 m)	200 lb (91 kg)	Apr 19, 2014
Donte Grantham; SF	Recruit ratings: Scout: Rivals: 247Sports: ESPN:				
Gabe DeVoe; SG	Shelby, NC	Shelby High School	6 ft 2 in (1.88 m)	185 lb (84 kg)	Aug 6, 2013
Gabe DeVoe; SG	Recruit ratings: Scout: Rivals: 247Sports: ESPN:				
Overall recruit ranking: Scout: NA Rivals: NA ESPN: NA
Note: In many cases, Scout, Rivals, 247Sports, On3, and ESPN may conflict in their listings of height and weight.; In these cases, the average was taken. ESPN grades are on a 100-point scale.; Sources: "ESPN". ESPN.; "2014 Team Ranking". Rivals.

== Roster ==
2014–15 Clemson Tigers men's basketball team
Players
Coaches

Pos.	#	Name	Height	Weight	Year	Hometown
F	1	Austin Ajukwa	6 ft 6 in (1.98 m)	205 lb (93 kg)	So	Columbia, South Carolina
G	2	Carson Fields	6 ft 4 in (1.93 m)	200 lb (91 kg)	Sr	Pewee Valley, Kentucky
G	3	Avry Holmes (W)	6 ft 2 in (1.88 m)	205 lb (93 kg)	Jr	Salem, Oregon
G	4	Patrick Rooks	6 ft 2 in (1.88 m)	190 lb (86 kg)	RS Fr	Charlotte, North Carolina
F	5	Jaron Blossomgame	6 ft 7 in (2.01 m)	215 lb (98 kg)	RS So	Alpharetta, Georgia
G	10	Gabe DeVoe	6 ft 3 in (1.91 m)	200 lb (91 kg)	Fr	Shelby, North Carolina
G	12	Rod Hall	6 ft 1 in (1.85 m)	205 lb (93 kg)	Sr	Augusta, Georgia
C	15	Donte Grantham	6 ft 8 in (2.03 m)	205 lb (93 kg)	Fr	Martinsburg, West Virginia
G	20	Jordan Roper	6 ft 0 in (1.83 m)	165 lb (75 kg)	Jr	Columbia, South Carolina
G	21	Damarcus Harrison	6 ft 4 in (1.93 m)	205 lb (93 kg)	RS Sr	Greenwood, South Carolina
F	33	Josh Smith	6 ft 8 in (2.03 m)	245 lb (111 kg)	Jr	Charlotte, North Carolina
C	35	Landry Nnoko	6 ft 10 in (2.08 m)	255 lb (116 kg)	Jr	Yaoundé, Cameroon
C	50	Sidy Djitte	6 ft 10 in (2.08 m)	240 lb (109 kg)	So	Dakar, Senegal

Head coach

- Brad Brownell

Assistant coach(es)

- Mike Winiecki
- Richie Riley
- Steve Smith

Legend

- (C) Team captain
- (S) Suspended
- (I) Ineligible
- (W) Walk-on
- Injured
- Current redshirt

Roster

== Schedule ==
Date time, TV	Rank^{#}	Opponent^{#}	Result	Record	High points	High rebounds	High assists	Site (attendance) city, state
Exhibition
11/08/2014*; 5:00 pm		Anderson	W 62–36		12 – Hall, Roper	13 – Blossomgame	3 – Blossomgame	Littlejohn Coliseum; Clemson, SC
Non-conference regular season
11/14/2014*; 7:00 pm, ESPN3		Florida A&M	W 86–41	1–0	15 – Nnoko	8 – Djitte	10 – Hall	Littlejohn Coliseum (6,646); Clemson, SC
11/17/2014*; 7:00 pm, RSN		Winthrop	L 74–77	1–1	19 – Nnoko	9 – Nnoko	3 – Roper	Littlejohn Coliseum (5,960); Clemson, SC
11/21/2014*; 1:30 pm, ParadiseJam.com		vs. Gardner–Webb; Paradise Jam tournament quarterfinals	L 70-72	1–2	19 – Harrison	10 – Blossomgame	3 – Blossomgame, Hall	Sports and Fitness Center (1,351); Saint Thomas, VI
11/22/2014*; 2:30 pm, ParadiseJam.com		vs. Nevada; Paradise Jam Tournament consolation semifinals	W 59–50	2–2	13 – Blossomgame	7 – Harrison	2 – Hall, Roper	Sports and Fitness Center (1,968); Saint Thomas, VI
11/24/2014*; 4:00 pm, ParadiseJam.com		vs. LSU; Paradise Jam Tournament fifth place game	W 64–61	3–2	16 – Harrison	10 – Blossomgame	3 – Grantham	Sports and Fitness Center (1,342); Saint Thomas, VI
11/28/2014*; 7:00 pm, ESPN3		High Point	W 62–59	4–2	14 – Blossomgame	13 – Blossomgame, Nnoko	6 – Roper	Littlejohn Coliseum (6,767); Clemson, SC
12/01/2014*; 7:00 pm, ESPNU		Rutgers; ACC–Big Ten Challenge	L 64-69	4–3	15 – Harrison	10 – Blossomgame, Nnoko	7 – Hall	Littlejohn Coliseum (6,285); Clemson, SC
12/07/2014*; 5:00 pm, ESPNU		No. 18 Arkansas	W 68–65 ^{OT}	5–3	19 – Hall	8 – Blossomgame	5 – Harrison	Littlejohn Coliseum (6,764); Clemson, SC
12/14/2014*; 4:00 pm, ESPN3		Auburn	W 72–61	6–3	20 – Hall	10 – Blossomgame	2 – Harrison	Littlejohn Coliseum (7,140); Clemson, SC
12/19/2014*; 7:00 pm, SECN		at South Carolina; Rivalry	L 45–68	6–4	14 – Blossomgame	6 – Djitte	3 – Hall	Colonial Life Arena (11,992); Columbia, SC
12/22/2014*; 7:00 pm, ESPN3		Oakland	W 70–60	7–4	26 – Blossomgame	8 – Grantham	6 – Hall	Littlejohn Coliseum (7,146); Clemson, SC
12/30/2014*; 7:00 pm, ESPN3		Robert Morris	W 64–57	8–4	16 – Blossomgame	12 – Blossomgame	5 – Hall	Littlejohn Coliseum (6,303); Clemson, SC
ACC regular season
01/03/2015; 8:15 pm, ESPN		No. 19 North Carolina	L 50–74	8–5 (0–1)	13 – Blossomgame	7 – Nnoko	2 – DeVoe, Grantham, Harrison	Littlejohn Coliseum (8,404); Clemson, SC
01/07/2015; 9:00 pm, ACCN		at No. 5 Louisville	L 52–58	8–6 (0–2)	15 – Blossomgame	9 – Blossomgame	4 – Hall	KFC Yum! Center (21,676); Louisville, KY
01/10/2015; 12:00 pm, RSN		at Pittsburgh	W 71–62	9–6 (1–2)	18 – Blossomgame	7 – Djitte & Hall	4 – Hall & Roper	Peterson Events Center (12,508); Pittsburgh, PA
01/13/2015; 8:00 pm, ACCN		at No. 2 Virginia	L 42–65	9–7 (1–3)	9 – Blossomgame	10 – Blossomgame	3 – Hall	John Paul Jones Arena (13,604); Charlottesville, VA
01/17/2015; 4:00 pm, ACCN		Syracuse	W 66–53	10–7 (2–3)	16 – Grantham	12 – Blossomgame	6 – Hall	Littlejohn Coliseum (10,000); Clemson, SC
01/19/2015; 9:00 pm, ESPNU		Florida State	L 55–59	10–8 (2–4)	12 – Hall	8 – Blossomgame	3 – Hall	Littlejohn Coliseum (6,993); Clemson, SC
01/24/2015; 12:00 pm, ACCN		Wake Forest	W 59–57	11–8 (3–4)	13 – Grantham	8 – Smith	5 – Hall	Littlejohn Coliseum (8,056); Clemson, SC
01/28/2015; 9:00 pm, ACCN		at NC State	W 68–57	12–8 (4–4)	18 – Roper	12 – Blossomgame	3 – Hall	PNC Arena (15,866); Raleigh, NC
01/31/2015; 12:00 pm, RSN		Boston College	W 64–49	13–8 (5–4)	24 – Roper	9 – Nnoko	6 – Hall	Littlejohn Coliseum (8,345); Clemson, SC
02/04/2015; 9:00 pm, RSN		at Florida State	W 62–56	14–8 (6–4)	14 – Blossomgame	8 – Smith	4 – Roper	Donald L. Tucker Civic Center (6,362); Tallahassee, FL
02/08/2015; 6:30 pm, ESPNU		at Miami (FL)	L 45–56	14–9 (6–5)	10 – Grantham & Roper	7 – Grantham	3 – Hall	BankUnited Center (6,351); Coral Gables, FL
02/10/2015; 7:00 pm, ESPN2		No. 10 Notre Dame	L 58–60	14–10 (6–6)	17 – Blossomgame	14 – Blossomgame	4 – Grantham	Littlejohn Coliseum (8,965); Clemson, SC
02/14/2015; 12:00 pm, RSN		Virginia Tech	W 75–54	15–10 (7–6)	21 – Roper	7 – Blossomgame	5 – Roper	Littlejohn Coliseum (8,645); Clemson, SC
02/16/2015; 7:00 pm, ESPNU		at Georgia Tech	L 52–63	15–11 (7–7)	10 – Ajukwa, Blossomgame	7 – Blossomgame	3 – Hall	Hank McCamish Pavilion (5,653); Atlanta, GA
02/21/2015; 4:00 pm, ESPN		at No. 4 Duke	L 56–78	15–12 (7–8)	10 – Blossomgame	8 – Grantham	4 – Hall	Cameron Indoor Stadium (9,314); Durham, NC
02/28/2015; 12:00 pm, ACCN		Georgia Tech	W 70–63 ^{OT}	16–12 (8–8)	18 – Blossomgame	9 – Blossomgame	4 – Hall	Littlejohn Coliseum (8,553); Clemson, SC
03/03/2015; 9:00 pm, RSN		NC State	L 61–66	16–13 (8–9)	18 – DeVoe	10 – Blossomgame	2 – Ajukwa, Hall	Littlejohn Coliseum (8,828); Clemson, SC
03/07/2015; 4:00 pm, ACCN		at No. 12 Notre Dame	L 67–81	16–14 (8–10)	22 – Blossomgame	10 – Blossomgame	4 – Grantham, DeVoe	Edmund P. Joyce Center (9,149); South Bend, IN
ACC tournament
03/11/2015; 12:00 pm, ESPN		vs. Florida State	L 73–76	16–15	25 – Hall	7 – Blossomgame, Nnoko	7 – Grantham	Greensboro Coliseum; Greensboro, NC
*Non-conference game. ^{#}Rankings from AP Poll. (#) Tournament seedings in parentheses. All times are in Eastern Time.
