= 2015 Big South Conference men's basketball tournament =

- Classification: Division I
- Season: 2014–15
- Teams: 11
- Site: HTC Center; Conway, South Carolina
- Champions: Coastal Carolina (5th title)
- Winning coach: Cliff Ellis (2nd title)
- MVP: Elijah Wilson (Coastal Carolina)

2014–15 Big South men's basketball standings
	Conf.				Overall
Team	W		L	PCT	W		L	PCT
Charleston Southern	13	–	5	.722	19	–	12	.613
High Point	13	–	5	.722	23	–	10	.697
Coastal Carolina †	12	–	6	.667	24	–	10	.706
Radford	12	–	6	.667	22	–	12	.647
Winthrop	12	–	6	.667	19	–	13	.594
UNC Asheville	10	–	8	.556	15	–	16	.484
Gardner–Webb	10	–	8	.556	20	–	15	.571
Presbyterian	6	–	12	.333	10	–	22	.313
Longwood	5	–	13	.278	11	–	23	.324
Campbell	4	–	14	.222	10	–	22	.313
Liberty	2	–	16	.111	8	–	24	.250
† 2015 Big South tournament winner

The 2015 Big South men's basketball tournament was the postseason men's basketball tournament for the Big South Conference that took place March 4 and 8, 2015, at the HTC Center in Conway, South Carolina. Quarterfinals and semifinal games were broadcast on ESPN3, with the championship game was televised on ESPN2. All 11 teams were eligible for the tournament. Teams were seeded 1-11, with the top five teams earning a first round bye. Previously, teams were split into two divisions.

== Seeds ==
Seed	School	Conference	Overall	Tiebreaker
1	Charleston Southern‡†	13–5	19–10	2–2 vs. Coastal, Radford
2	High Point†	13–5	22–8	0–4 vs. Coastal, Radford
3	Coastal Carolina†	12–6	21–9	2–0 vs. High Point, 1–0 vs. Radford
4	Radford†	12–6	21–10	2–0 vs. High Point
5	Winthrop†	12–6	17–12	0–2 vs. High Point
6	UNC Asheville	10–8	14–15	2–0 vs. Gardner–Webb
7	Gardner–Webb	10–8	18–13	0–2 vs. UNC Asheville
8	Presbyterian	6–12	10–21	
9	Longwood	5–13	9–22	
10	Campbell	4–14	10–21	
11	Liberty	2–16	8–23	
‡ – Big South regular season champions. † – Received a bye in the conference tournament. Overall records are as of the end of the regular season.

== Schedule ==
Session	Game	Time*	Matchup^{#}	Television	Score
First round - Wednesday, March 4
1	1	12:00 pm	Presbyterian vs. Longwood	BSN	61–65
1	2	2:30 pm	Gardner–Webb vs. Campbell	BSN	72–64
1	3	6:00 pm	UNC Asheville vs. Liberty	BSN	80–70
Quarterfinals - Friday, March 6
2	4	12:00 pm	Charleston Southern vs. Longwood	ESPN3	60–68
2	5	2:30 pm	Radford vs. Winthrop	ESPN3	66–67
3	6	6:00 pm	High Point vs. Gardner–Webb	ESPN3	71–72
3	7	8:30 pm	Coastal Carolina vs. UNC Asheville	ESPN3	74–57
Semifinals - Saturday, March 7
4	8	12:00 pm	Winthrop vs. Longwood	ESPN3	71–58
4	9	2:00 pm	Coastal Carolina vs. Gardner–Webb	ESPN3	73–70
Championship - Sunday, March 8
5	10	12:30pm	Coastal Carolina vs. Winthrop	ESPN2	81–70
*Game times in ET. #-Rankings denote tournament seeding.

== Bracket ==
First round Wednesday, March 4
8	Presbyterian	61
9	Longwood	65
7	Gardner–Webb	72
10	Campbell	64
6	UNC Asheville	80
11	Liberty	70

Quarterfinals; Friday, March 6
1	Charleston Southern	60
9	Longwood	68
4	Radford	66
5	Winthrop	67
2	High Point	71
7	Gardner–Webb	72
3	Coastal Carolina	74
6	UNC Asheville	57

Semifinals; Saturday, March 7
9	Longwood	58
5	Winthrop	71
7	Gardner–Webb	70
3	Coastal Carolina	73

Championship; Sunday, March 8
5	Winthrop	70
3	Coastal Carolina	81
