= 2014–15 Gardner–Webb Runnin' Bulldogs men's basketball team =

American college basketball season

2014–15 Gardner–Webb Runnin' Bulldogs men's basketball
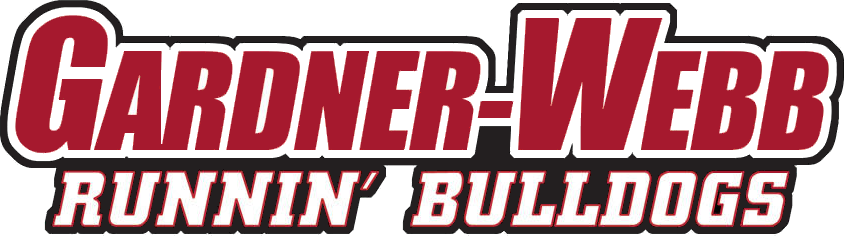

CBI, First round
- Conference: Big South Conference
- Record: 20–15 (10–8 Big South)
- Head coach: Tim Craft (2nd season)
- Assistant coaches: Jeremy Luther; Paul Hemrick; DeAntoine Beasley
- Home arena: Paul Porter Arena

2014–15 Big South men's basketball standings
	Conf.				Overall
Team	W		L	PCT	W		L	PCT
Charleston Southern	13	–	5	.722	19	–	12	.613
High Point	13	–	5	.722	23	–	10	.697
Coastal Carolina †	12	–	6	.667	24	–	10	.706
Radford	12	–	6	.667	22	–	12	.647
Winthrop	12	–	6	.667	19	–	13	.594
UNC Asheville	10	–	8	.556	15	–	16	.484
Gardner–Webb	10	–	8	.556	20	–	15	.571
Presbyterian	6	–	12	.333	10	–	22	.313
Longwood	5	–	13	.278	11	–	23	.324
Campbell	4	–	14	.222	10	–	22	.313
Liberty	2	–	16	.111	8	–	24	.250
† 2015 Big South tournament winner

The 2014–15 Gardner–Webb Runnin' Bulldogs men's basketball team represented Gardner–Webb University during the 2014–15 NCAA Division I men's basketball season. The Runnin' Bulldogs, led by second year head coach Tim Craft, played their home games at the Paul Porter Arena and were members of the Big South Conference. They finished the season 20–15, 10–8 in Big South play to finish in a tie for sixth place. They advanced to the semifinals of the Big South tournament where they lost to Coastal Carolina. They were invited to the College Basketball Invitational where they lost in the first round to Colorado.

== Roster ==
Number	Name	Position	Height	Weight	Year	Hometown
2	Tyler Strange	Guard	5–10	185	Senior	Leominster, Massachusetts
4	Harold McBride	Guard	6–0	175	Junior	Bronx, New York
5	Dylan Poston	Guard	6–4	190	Junior	Myrtle Beach, South Carolina
11	David Efianayi	Guard	6–2	170	Freshman	Orlando, Florida
14	Brandon Miller	Forward/Center	6–6	250	Freshman	Orlando, Florida
15	Jarvis Davis	Guard	6–0	180	Senior	Columbia, South Carolina
20	Tyrell Nelson	Center	6–7	230	Sophomore	Charlotte, North Carolina
21	Herve Aholode	Forward	6–6	235	Junior	Cotonou, Benin
23	Andonis Burbage	Guard	6–5	200	Junior	Orlando, Florida
24	Isaiah Ivey	Guard	6–2	190	Junior	Georgetown, Kentucky
30	Adam Sweeney	Guard	5–10	180	Junior	Madison, Ohio
33	Corey Hansley	Center	6–8	220	Senior	Candler, North Carolina
34	Jerome Hill	Forward	6–5	210	Junior	Adel, Georgia
50	L'Hassane Niangane	Center	6–10	240	Freshman	Chalon, France

== Schedule ==
Date time, TV	Opponent	Result	Record	Site (attendance) city, state
Regular season
11/15/2014*; 2:00 pm	at LSU; Paradise Jam	L 82–93	0–1	Pete Maravich Assembly Center (6,745); Baton Rouge, LA
11/17/2014*; 7:30 pm	at College of Charleston	W 80–67	1–1	TD Arena (3,527); Charleston, SC
11/21/2014*; 2:30 pm	vs. Clemson; Paradise Jam quarterfinals	W 72–70	2–1	Sports and Fitness Center (1,351); St. Thomas, USVI
11/23/2014*; 6:00 pm, CBSSN	vs. Seton Hall; Paradise Jam semifinals	L 67–85	2–2	Sports and Fitness Center (2,005); St. Thomas, USVI
11/24/2014*; 6:30 pm, CBSSN	vs. Old Dominion; Paradise Jam 3rd place game	L 46–58	2–3	Sports and Fitness Center (2,955); St. Thomas, USVI
11/29/2014*; 2:00 pm	Brevard	W 78–63	3–3	Paul Porter Arena (458); Boiling Springs, NC
12/02/2014*; 9:00 pm, P12N	at No. 3 Arizona	L 65–91	3–4	McKale Center (14,150); Tucson, AZ
12/05/2014*; 7:00 pm	Toccoa Falls	W 100–61	4–4	Paul Porter Arena (841); Boiling Springs, NC
12/06/2014*; 7:00 pm	Thomas	W 82–66	5–4	Paul Porter Arena (738); Boiling Springs, NC
12/13/2014*; 7:00 pm	Furman	W 74–68	6–4	Paul Porter Arena (1,281); Boiling Springs, NC
12/17/2014*; 7:00 pm	at Jacksonville	L 65–68	6–5	Jacksonville Veterans Memorial Arena (467); Jacksonville, FL
12/19/2014*; 7:00 pm	Hiwassee	W 91–71	7–5	Paul Porter Arena (854); Boiling Springs, NC
12/22/2014*; 6:00 pm	at Purdue	W 89–84	8–5	Mackey Arena (8,835); West Lafayette, IN
12/31/2014; 6:00 pm	at Presbyterian	W 81–64	9–5 (1–0)	Templeton Center (980); Clinton, SC
01/03/2015; 2:00 pm	at UNC Asheville	L 55–80	9–6 (1–1)	Kimmel Arena (1,321); Asheville, NC
01/08/2015; 7:00 pm	Radford	W 58–55	10–6 (2–1)	Paul Porter Arena (2,910); Boiling Springs, NC
01/10/2015; 7:00 pm, ESPN3	Winthrop	W 65–64	11–6 (3–1)	Paul Porter Arena (1,354); Boiling Springs, NC
01/14/2015; 7:00 pm	High Point	L 72–84	11–7 (3–2)	Paul Porter Arena (894); Boiling Springs, NC
01/17/2015; 4:30 pm	at Coastal Carolina	W 82–67	12–7 (4–2)	HTC Center (2,465); Conway, SC
01/22/2015; 7:00 pm	Longwood	W 79–67	13–7 (5–2)	Paul Porter Arena (874); Boiling Springs, NC
01/24/2015; 5:30 pm	at Charleston Southern	L 80–93	13–8 (5–3)	CSU Field House (950); Charleston, SC
01/26/2015; 8:00 pm, ASN	at Campbell	L 59–78	13–9 (5–4)	Gore Arena (1,476); Buies Creek, NC
01/31/2015; 4:00 pm	Coastal Carolina	W 66–64	14–9 (6–4)	Paul Porter Arena (1,635); Boiling Springs, NC
02/03/2015; 7:00 pm	at Longwood	W 87–78	15–9 (7–4)	Willett Hall (1,371); Farmville, VA
02/06/2015; 7:00 pm	Campbell	W 73–65 ^{OT}	16–9 (8–4)	Paul Porter Arena (1,341); Boiling Springs, NC
02/09/2015; 8:00 pm	UNC Asheville	L 89–92	16–10 (8–5)	Paul Porter Arena (1,235); Boiling Springs, NC
02/14/2015; 1:00 pm	at Winthrop	L 68–71	16–11 (8–6)	Winthrop Coliseum (1,149); Rock Hill, SC
02/18/2015; 7:00 pm	at High Point	L 62–83	16–12 (8–7)	Millis Center (1,613); High Point, NC
02/21/2015; 7:00 pm	Liberty	W 77–67	17–12 (9–7)	Paul Porter Arena (1,384); Boiling Springs, NC
02/26/2015; 7:00 pm	Charleston Southern	W 91–81	18–12 (10–7)	Paul Porter Arena (1,859); Boiling Springs, NC
02/28/2015; 4:00 pm	at Radford	L 62–72	18–13 (10–8)	Dedmon Center (3,522); Radford, VA
Big South tournament
03/04/2015; 2:30 pm	vs. Campbell; First round	W 72–64	19–13	HTC Center (1,337); Conway, SC
03/06/2015; 6:00 pm, ESPN3	vs. High Point; Quarterfinals	W 72–71 ^{OT}	20–13	HTC Center (3,275); Conway, SC
03/07/2015; 6:00 pm, ESPN3	at Coastal Carolina; Semifinals	L 70–73	20–14	HTC Center (2,765); Conway, SC
College Basketball Invitational
03/18/2015*; 9:00 pm	at Colorado; First round	L 78–87	20–15	Coors Events Center (1,280); Boulder, CO
*Non-conference game. ^{#}Rankings from AP Poll. (#) Tournament seedings in parentheses. All times are in Eastern Time.
