= 2014–15 Charleston Southern Buccaneers men's basketball team =

American college basketball season

2014–15 Charleston Southern Buccaneers men's basketball
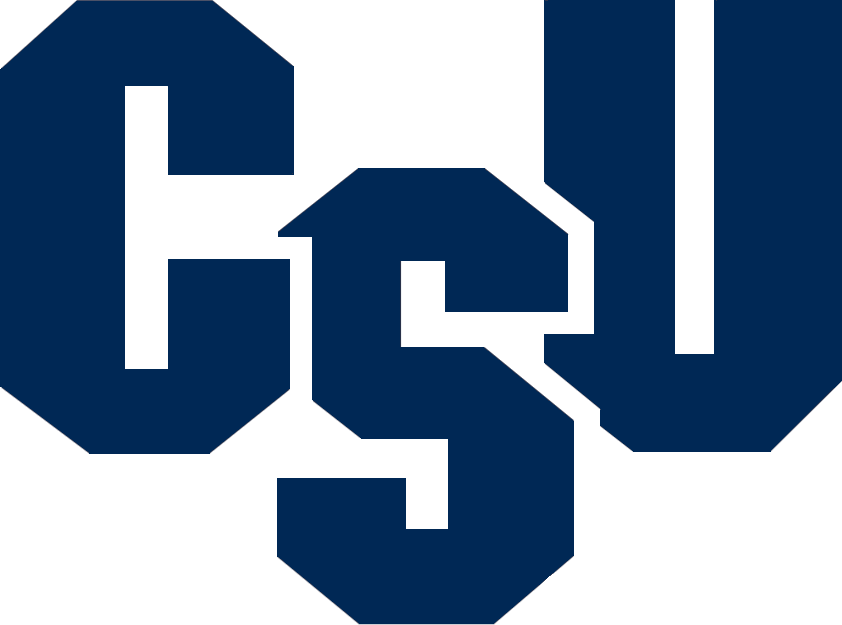

Big South regular season co–champions

NIT, First round
- Conference: Big South Conference
- Record: 19–12 (13–5 Big South)
- Head coach: Barclay Radebaugh (10th season)
- Assistant coaches: BJ McKie; Ahmad Smith; Tyler Murray
- Home arena: CSU Field House

2014–15 Big South men's basketball standings
	Conf.				Overall
Team	W		L	PCT	W		L	PCT
Charleston Southern	13	–	5	.722	19	–	12	.613
High Point	13	–	5	.722	23	–	10	.697
Coastal Carolina †	12	–	6	.667	24	–	10	.706
Radford	12	–	6	.667	22	–	12	.647
Winthrop	12	–	6	.667	19	–	13	.594
UNC Asheville	10	–	8	.556	15	–	16	.484
Gardner–Webb	10	–	8	.556	20	–	15	.571
Presbyterian	6	–	12	.333	10	–	22	.313
Longwood	5	–	13	.278	11	–	23	.324
Campbell	4	–	14	.222	10	–	22	.313
Liberty	2	–	16	.111	8	–	24	.250
† 2015 Big South tournament winner

The 2014–15 Charleston Southern Buccaneers men's basketball team represented Charleston Southern University during the 2014–15 NCAA Division I men's basketball season. The Buccaneers, led by tenth year head coach Barclay Radebaugh, played their home games at the CSU Field House and were members of the Big South Conference. They finished the season 19–12, 13–5 in Big South play to finish in a tie for the regular season Big South championship. They were upset in the quarterfinals of the Big South tournament by Longwood. As a regular season conference champion, and #1 seed in their conference tournament, who failed to win their conference tournament they received an automatic bid to the National Invitation Tournament where they lost in the first round to Old Dominion.

== Roster ==
Number	Name	Position	Height	Weight	Year	Hometown
0	Arlon Harper	Guard	6–2	180	Senior	College Park, Georgia
1	Will Saunders	Forward	6–7	190	Senior	London, England
2	Aaron Wheeler	Guard	6–4	190	Junior	Morristown, Tennessee
4	Jarryd Coleman	Guard	6–3	180	Freshman	Greenwood, South Carolina
5	Saah Nimley	Guard	5–8	158	Senior	Lawrenceville, Georgia
10	Danny Upchurch	Guard	6–0	170	Freshman	Fairfield, Connecticut
11	Wesley Johnson	Forward	6–8	210	Freshman	Greenville, South Carolina
12	Kris Brown	Forward/Center	6–8	245	Junior	Fort Worth, Texas
13	Jantzen Colie Raymond	Guard	6–3	180	Freshman	Columbia, South Carolina
14	Raemond Robinson	Guard	6–3	190	Junior	Goose Creek, South Carolina
15	Paul Gombwer	Forward	6–6	217	Senior	Kaduna, Nigeria
21	Jabbar Washington	Forward	6–3	180	Junior	Michigan City, Indiana
22	Zack Durkee	Forward	6–3	180	Sophomore	Anderson, South Carolina
23	Javis Howard	Forward	6–8	210	Freshman	Irmo, South Carolina
24	Cedrick Bowen	Forward	6–5	232	Senior	Woodstock, Georgia
44	Reuben King	Forward	6–4	215	Junior	Brooklyn, New York

== Schedule ==
Date time, TV	Rank^{#}	Opponent^{#}	Result	Record	Site (attendance) city, state
Regular season
11/14/2014*; 7:00 pm, SECN+		at Ole Miss	W 66–65 ^{OT}	1–0	Tad Smith Coliseum (5,841); Oxford, MS
11/17/2014*; 7:30 pm		Erskine	W 92–50	2–0	CSU Field House (968); Charleston, SC
11/22/2014*; 5:30 pm		Wright State	L 79–86	2–1	CSU Field House (923); Charleston, SC
11/25/2014*; 7:30 pm		Central Arkansas	W 80–67	3–1	CSU Field House (777); Charleston, SC
11/28/2014*; 6:00 pm, ESPN3		at Florida State	L 47–58	3–2	Donald L. Tucker Civic Center (5,660); Tallahassee, FL
12/01/2014*; 7:30 pm		Western Carolina	W 72–66	4–2	CSU Field House (855); Charleston, SC
12/04/2014*; 7:30 pm		Columbia International	W 105–55	5–2	CSU Field House (704); Charleston, SC
12/12/2014*; 7:00 pm, ESPN3		at NC State	L 50–86	5–3	PNC Arena (5,048); Raleigh, NC
12/17/2014*; 7:00 pm		at Wofford	L 58–64	5–4	Benjamin Johnson Arena (1,606); Spartanburg, SC
12/22/2014*; 8:00 pm		at No. 24 Colorado State	L 54–75	5–5	Moby Arena (3,392); Fort Collins, CO
12/29/2014*; 6:00 pm		Johnson (TN)	W 81–47	6–5	CSU Field House (520); Charleston, SC
01/03/2015; 2:00 pm		at Coastal Carolina	L 74–83	6–6 (0–1)	HTC Center (2,431); Conway, SC
01/05/2015; 7:30 pm		Campbell	W 74–71	7–6 (1–1)	CSU Field House (635); Charleston, SC
01/08/2015; 7:00 pm		at High Point	L 61–72	7–7 (1–2)	Millis Center (1,213); High Point, NC
01/10/2015; 5:30 pm		Longwood	W 68–54	8–7 (2–2)	CSU Field House (783); Charleston, SC
01/14/2015; 7:30 pm		Liberty	W 80–58	9–7 (3–2)	CSU Field House (808); Charleston, SC
01/17/2015; 7:30 pm		at Presbyterian	W 73–65	10–7 (4–2)	Templeton Center (1,050); Clinton, SC
01/19/2015; 7:30 pm		UNC Asheville	W 82–75	11–7 (5–2)	CSU Field House (909); Charleston, SC
01/24/2015; 5:30 pm		Gardner–Webb	W 93–80	12–7 (6–2)	CSU Field House (950); Charleston, SC
01/28/2015; 7:30 pm		Radford	L 77–84	12–8 (6–3)	CSU Field House (982); Charleston, SC
01/31/2015; 7:00 pm, ESPN3		at Liberty	W 74–62	13–8 (7–3)	Vines Center (2,191); Lynchburg, VA
02/02/2015; 8:00 pm		at Winthrop	L 55–77	13–9 (7–4)	Winthrop Coliseum (774); Rock Hill, SC
02/06/2015; 7:00 pm		at Radford	W 79–71	14–9 (8–4)	Dedmon Center (2,912); Radford, VA
02/11/2015; 7:30 pm		Coastal Carolina	W 83–72	15–9 (9–4)	CSU Field House (919); Charleston, SC
02/14/2015; 5:00 pm		at Longwood	W 65–64	16–9 (10–4)	Willett Hall (1,024); Farmville, VA
02/18/2015; 7:30 pm		Presbyterian	W 75–49	17–9 (11–4)	CSU Field House (915); Charleston, SC
02/21/2015; 4:00 pm		at Campbell	W 86–57	18–9 (12–4)	Gore Arena (1,521); Buies Creek, NC
02/26/2015; 7:00 pm		at Gardner–Webb	L 81–91	18–10 (12–5)	Paul Porter Arena (1,859); Boiling Springs, NC
02/28/2015; 4:30 pm		High Point	W 97–93 ^{3OT}	19–10 (13–5)	CSU Field House (1,157); Charleston, SC
Big South tournament
03/06/2015; 12:00 pm, ESPN3	(1)	vs. (9) Longwood; Quarterfinals	L 60–68	19–11	HTC Center (1,773); Conway, SC
NIT
03/18/2015*; 7:15 pm, ESPN3	(8)	at (1) Old Dominion; First round	L 56–65	19–12	Ted Constant Convocation Center (4,736); Norfolk, VA
*Non-conference game. ^{#}Rankings from AP Poll. (#) Tournament seedings in parentheses. All times are in Eastern Time. (#) during NIT is seed within region.
