= 2014–15 Campbell Fighting Camels basketball team =

American college basketball season

2014–15 Campbell Fighting Camels basketball
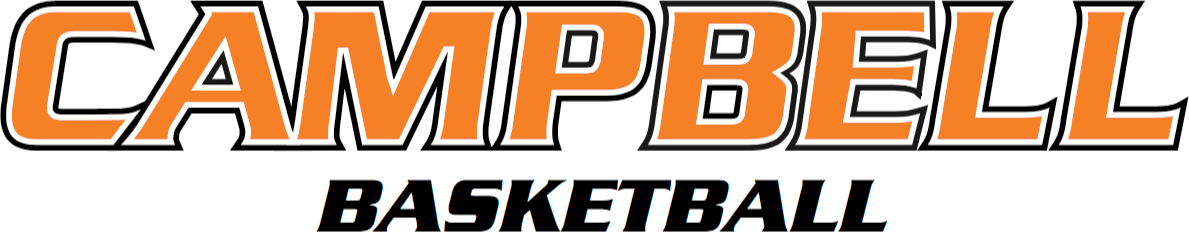
- Conference: Big South Conference
- Record: 10–22 (4–14 Big South)
- Head coach: Kevin McGeehan (2nd season)
- Assistant coaches: Peter Thomas; Chris Clark; Dan Geriot
- Home arena: Gore Arena

2014–15 Big South men's basketball standings
	Conf.				Overall
Team	W		L	PCT	W		L	PCT
Charleston Southern	13	–	5	.722	19	–	12	.613
High Point	13	–	5	.722	23	–	10	.697
Coastal Carolina †	12	–	6	.667	24	–	10	.706
Radford	12	–	6	.667	22	–	12	.647
Winthrop	12	–	6	.667	19	–	13	.594
UNC Asheville	10	–	8	.556	15	–	16	.484
Gardner–Webb	10	–	8	.556	20	–	15	.571
Presbyterian	6	–	12	.333	10	–	22	.313
Longwood	5	–	13	.278	11	–	23	.324
Campbell	4	–	14	.222	10	–	22	.313
Liberty	2	–	16	.111	8	–	24	.250
† 2015 Big South tournament winner

The 2014–15 Campbell Fighting Camels basketball team represented Campbell University during the 2014–15 NCAA Division I men's basketball season. The Fighting Camels were led by second year Kevin McGeehan and played their home games at Gore Arena. They were members of the Big South Conference. They finished the season 10–22, 4–14 in Big South play to finish in tenth place. They lost in the first round of the Big South tournament to Gardner–Webb.

== Roster ==
Number	Name	Position	Height	Weight	Year	Hometown
0	Kyre' Hamer	Guard	6–2	200	Sophomore	Stone Mountain, Georgia
1	Luke Moyer	Guard	6–0	190	Junior	Souderton, Pennsylvania
2	Tony Toplyn	Forward	6–6	190	Freshman	Philadelphia, Pennsylvania
3	Casey Perrin	Guard	5–9	170	Junior	Scottsdale, Arizona
4	Lance Brown	Guard	5–10	160	Junior	Greensboro, North Carolina
5	Rod Days	Forward	6–6	230	Junior	Miami Gardens, Florida
11	Jordan Faciane	Guard	6–2	235	Junior	Ellenwood, Georgia
13	Quinton Ray	Guard	6–0	195	Sophomore	Angier, North Carolina
15	Curtis Phillips	Forward	6–5	185	Freshman	Memphis, Tennessee
20	Andrew Ryan	Guard	6–5	200	Senior	Lynden, Washington
22	D.J. Mason	Forward	6–6	220	Junior	Clarkton, North Carolina
23	Jacob Talbert	Guard	6–0	195	Sophomore	Southern Pines, North Carolina
25	Reco McCarter	Forward	6–6	195	Senior	Goldsboro, North Carolina
30	Nehemiah Mabson	Forward	6–6	250	Freshman	Charlotte, North Carolina
32	Shane Whitfield	Forward	6–7	210	Sophomore	Raleigh, North Carolina
33	Troy Harper	Guard	6–1	165	Freshman	Philadelphia, Pennsylvania

== Schedule ==
Date time, TV	Opponent	Result	Record	Site (attendance) city, state
Exhibition
11/08/2014*; 7:00 pm	Coker	W 73–65		Gore Arena (1,402); Buies Creek, NC
Regular season
11/14/2014*; 7:30 pm	Barber–Scotia	W 97–58	1–0	Gore Arena (1,470); Buies Creek, NC
11/18/2014*; 7:00 pm	at Davidson	L 51–86	1–1	John M. Belk Arena (3,164); Davidson, NC
11/22/2014*; 2:00 pm	Colgate; Buckeye Classic	L 48–54	1–2	Gore Arena (1,253); Buies Creek, NC
11/26/2014*; 7:00 pm, BTN	at No. 16 Ohio State; Buckeye Classic	L 64–91	1–3	Value City Arena (12,508); Columbus, OH
11/30/2014*; 3:30 pm	at Sacred Heart; Buckeye Classic	L 62–71	1–4	William H. Pitt Center (N/A); Fairfield, CT
12/02/2014*; 7:00 pm	at James Madison; Buckeye Classic	L 61–63	1–5	JMU Convocation Center (2,631); Harrisonburg, VA
12/08/2014*; 7:00 pm	Johnson & Wales	W 63–38	2–5	Gore Arena (881); Buies Creek, NC
12/10/2014*; 7:00 pm	at Delaware State	W 70–55	3–5	Memorial Hall (878); Dover, DE
12/14/2014*; 2:00 pm	at College of Charleston	L 47–58	3–6	TD Arena (1,817); Charleston, SC
12/17/2014*; 7:00 pm	SIU Edwardsville	W 70–65	4–6	Gore Arena (983); Buies Creek, NC
12/20/2014*; 2:00 pm	Montreat	W 90–64	5–6	Gore Arena (882); Buies Creek, NC
12/23/2014*; 2:00 pm	UNC Wilmington	W 69–63	6–6	Gore Arena (1,313); Buies Creek, NC
12/28/2014*; 2:00 pm	at Samford	L 56–65	6–7	Pete Hanna Center (589); Homewood, AL
12/31/2014; 2:00 pm	Liberty	W 53–46	7–7 (1–0)	Gore Arena (1,175); Buies Creek, NC
01/05/2015; 7:30 pm	at Charleston Southern	L 71–74	7–8 (1–1)	CSU Field House (635); Charleston, SC
01/10/2015; 7:00 pm	at High Point	L 62–69	7–9 (1–2)	Millis Center (1,403); High Point, NC
01/12/2015; 7:00 pm	Coastal Carolina	L 67–70	7–10 (1–3)	Gore Arena (1,516); Buies Creek, NC
01/15/2015; 7:00 pm	Radford	L 55–72	7–11 (1–4)	Gore Arena (1,206); Buies Creek, NC
01/17/2015; 4:00 pm	UNC Asheville	L 65–69	7–12 (1–5)	Gore Arena (2,258); Buies Creek, NC
01/22/2015; 7:00 pm	at Presbyterian	L 70–72	7–13 (1–6)	Templeton Center (627); Clinton, SC
01/24/2015; 4:00 pm	at Winthrop	L 63–71	7–14 (1–7)	Winthrop Coliseum (2,804); Rock Hill, SC
01/26/2015; 8:00 pm, ASN	Gardner–Webb	W 78–59	8–14 (2–7)	Gore Arena (1,476); Buies Creek, NC
01/31/2015; 4:30 pm	at UNC Asheville	L 63–70	8–15 (2–8)	Kimmel Arena (1,965); Asheville, NC
02/03/2015; 7:00 pm	Presbyterian	W 66–53	9–15 (3–8)	Gore Arena (1,453); Buies Creek, NC
02/06/2015; 7:00 pm	at Gardner–Webb	L 65–73 ^{OT}	9–16 (3–9)	Paul Porter Arena (1,341); Boiling Springs, NC
02/10/2015; 7:00 pm	at Liberty	L 60–73	9–17 (3–10)	Vines Center (1,385); Lynchburg, VA
02/14/2015; 4:00 pm	High Point	L 51–63	9–18 (3–11)	Gore Arena (2,015); Buies Creek, NC
02/19/2015; 7:00 pm	at Coastal Carolina	L 57–81	9–19 (3–12)	HTC Center (2,361); Conway, SC
02/21/2015; 4:00 pm	Charleston Southern	L 57–86	9–20 (3–13)	Gore Arena (1,521); Buies Creek, NC
02/26/2015; 7:00 pm	Winthrop	W 65–50	10–20 (4–13)	Gore Arena (1,045); Buies Creek, NC
02/28/2015; 2:00 pm	at Longwood	L 65–70	10–21 (4–14)	Willett Hall (1,328); Farmville, VA
Big South tournament
03/04/2015; 2:30 pm	vs. Gardner–Webb; First round	L 64–72	10–22	HTC Center (1,337); Conway, SC
*Non-conference game. ^{#}Rankings from AP Poll. (#) Tournament seedings in parentheses. All times are in Eastern Time.
