= 2014–15 Radford Highlanders men's basketball team =

American college basketball season

2014–15 Radford Highlanders men's basketball
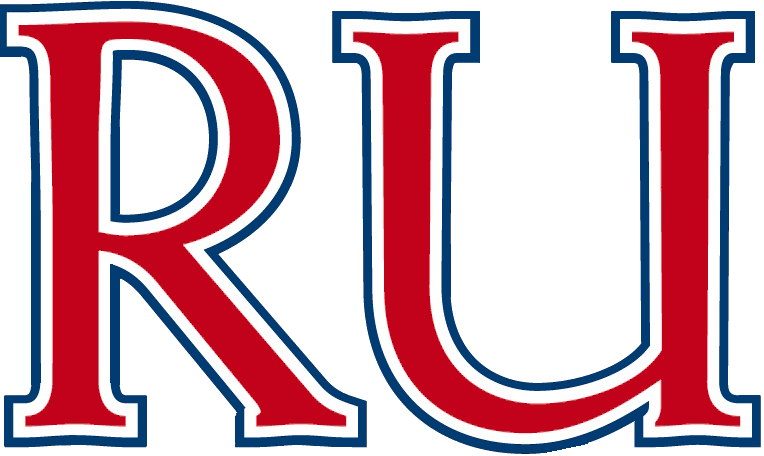

CBI, Quarterfinals
- Conference: Big South Conference
- Record: 22–12 (12–6 Big South)
- Head coach: Mike Jones (4th season)
- Assistant coaches: Kyle Getter; Chris Hawkins; Aaron Marshall
- Home arena: Dedmon Center

2014–15 Big South men's basketball standings
	Conf.				Overall
Team	W		L	PCT	W		L	PCT
Charleston Southern	13	–	5	.722	19	–	12	.613
High Point	13	–	5	.722	23	–	10	.697
Coastal Carolina †	12	–	6	.667	24	–	10	.706
Radford	12	–	6	.667	22	–	12	.647
Winthrop	12	–	6	.667	19	–	13	.594
UNC Asheville	10	–	8	.556	15	–	16	.484
Gardner–Webb	10	–	8	.556	20	–	15	.571
Presbyterian	6	–	12	.333	10	–	22	.313
Longwood	5	–	13	.278	11	–	23	.324
Campbell	4	–	14	.222	10	–	22	.313
Liberty	2	–	16	.111	8	–	24	.250
† 2015 Big South tournament winner

The 2014–15 Radford Highlanders men's basketball team represented Radford University during the 2014–15 NCAA Division I men's basketball season. The Highlanders, led by fourth year head coach Mike Jones, played their home games at the Dedmon Center and were members of the Big South Conference. They finished the season 22–12, 12–6 in Big South play to finish in a three way tie for third place. They lost in the quarterfinals of the Big South tournament to Winthrop. They were invited to the College Basketball Invitational where they Delaware State in the first round before losing in the quarterfinals to Vermont.

== Roster ==
Number	Name	Position	Height	Weight	Year	Hometown
00	Kion Brown	Forward	6–7	210	Junior	Richmond, Virginia
1	Taj Owens	Guard	5–9	160	Junior	Chesapeake, Virginia
2	Javonte Green	Guard	6–4	205	Senior	Petersburg, Virginia
3	Cameron Jones	Guard	6–4	180	Junior	Roanoke, Virginia
5	Rashaun Davis	Guard	5–11	185	Junior	Charlotte, North Carolina
10	R.J. Price	Guard	5–11	180	Senior	Richmond, Virginia
11	Ya Ya Anderson	Guard	6–2	195	Junior	Palmyra, Virginia
14	Justin Cousin	Guard	6–0	195	Sophomore	Burlington, North Carolina
15	Lucas Dyer	Forward	6–8	215	RS–Sophomore	Richmond, Virginia
22	Kyle Gonzalez	Guard	6–4	185	Junior	Springfield, Virginia
30	Jalen Carethers	Forward	6–8	205	Senior	Burlington, North Carolina
32	Sterling Christy	Forward	6–6	205	Freshman	Williamsport, Maryland
33	Kyle Noreen	Guard	6–4	210	Senior	Minneapolis, Minnesota
55	Brandon Holcomb	Center	6–7	215	Junior	Murrieta, California

== Schedule ==
Date time, TV	Opponent	Result	Record	Site (attendance) city, state
Regular season
11/14/2014*; 7:30 pm	at Richmond	L 46–64	0–1	Robins Center (6,920); Richmond, VA
11/17/2014*; 7:00 pm	at James Madison	L 71–74	0–2	JMU Convocation Center (2,729); Harrisonburg, VA
11/20/2014*; 7:30 pm	Howard	W 61–52	1–2	Dedmon Center (2,715); Radford, VA
11/23/2014*; 3:00 pm	Catawba; Corpus Christi Coastal Classic	W 88–52	2–2	Dedmon Center (753); Radford, VA
11/26/2014*; 8:00 pm	at TCU; Corpus Christi Coastal Classic	L 50–74	2–3	Wilkerson-Greines Activity Center (3,436); Fort Worth, TX
11/28/2014*; 1:30 pm	vs. North Carolina A&T; Corpus Christi Coastal Classic	W 65–57	3–3	American Bank Center (6,039); Corpus Christi, TX
11/29/2014*; 2:00 pm	vs. Texas A&M–Corpus Christi; Corpus Christi Coastal Classic	W 57–46	4–3	American Bank Center (N/A); Corpus Christi, TX
12/07/2014*; 3:00 pm, ESPN3	at Virginia Tech; Rivalry	W 68–66	5–3	Cassell Coliseum (5,394); Blacksburg, VA
12/13/2014*; 12:00 pm, FS1	at Georgetown	L 49–76	5–4	Verizon Center (6,843); Washington, D.C.
12/16/2014*; 7:00 pm	Johnson & Wales	W 92–54	6–4	Dedmon Center (1,012); Radford, VA
12/19/2014*; 4:00 pm	Siena	W 76–66	7–4	Dedmon Center (1,113); Radford, VA
12/21/2014*; 2:00 pm	Cornell	W 74–61	8–4	Dedmon Center (754); Radford, VA
12/28/2014*; 3:00 pm	Central Penn	W 119–69	9–4	Dedmon Center (1,023); Radford, VA
12/31/2014; 4:00 pm	UNC Asheville	L 60–62	9–5 (0–1)	Dedmon Center (1,853); Radford, VA
01/03/2015; 5:00 pm	at Longwood	L 79–90 ^{2OT}	9–6 (0–2)	Willett Hall (1,802); Farmville, VA
01/08/2015; 7:00 pm	at Gardner–Webb	L 55–58	9–7 (0–3)	Paul Porter Arena (2,910); Boiling Springs, NC
01/10/2015; 4:00 pm	Presbyterian	W 95–82	10–7 (1–3)	Dedmon Center (1,066); Radford, VA
01/15/2015; 7:00 pm	at Campbell	W 72–55	11–7 (2–3)	Gore Arena (1,206); Buies Creek, NC
01/17/2015; 1:00 pm	at Winthrop	W 85–77	12–7 (3–3)	Winthrop Coliseum (973); Rock Hill, SC
01/22/2015; 7:00 pm	High Point	W 73–66	13–7 (4–3)	Dedmon Center (2,832); Radford, VA
01/24/2015; 4:30 pm, ESPN3	Liberty	W 84–76	14–7 (5–3)	Dedmon Center (2,948); Radford, VA
01/28/2015; 7:30 pm	at Charleston Southern	W 84–77	15–7 (6–3)	CSU Field House (982); Charleston, SC
01/31/2015; 4:00 pm	Winthrop	W 73–66	16–7 (7–3)	Dedmon Center (3,046); Radford, VA
02/03/2015; 7:00 pm, ESPN3	at High Point	W 67–64	17–7 (8–3)	Millis Center (1,527); High Point, NC
02/06/2015; 7:00 pm	Charleston Southern	L 71–79	17–8 (8–4)	Dedmon Center (2,912); Radford, VA
02/11/2015; 7:00 pm	Longwood	W 80–75	18–8 (9–4)	Dedmon Center (2,341); Radford, VA
02/14/2015; 7:30 pm	at Presbyterian	W 62–56	19–8 (10–4)	Templeton Center (610); Clinton, SC
02/16/2015; 8:00 pm	Coastal Carolina	L 59–65	19–9 (10–5)	Dedmon Center (913); Radford, VA
02/21/2015; 4:30 pm	at UNC Asheville	W 75–68	20–9 (11–5)	Kimmel Arena (2,464); Asheville, NC
02/26/2015; 7:00 pm, ESPN3	at Liberty	L 69–80	20–10 (11–6)	Vines Center (1,646); Lynchburg, VA
02/28/2015; 4:00 pm	Gardner–Webb	W 72–62	21–10 (12–6)	Dedmon Center (3,522); Radford, VA
Big South tournament
03/06/2015; 2:30 pm, ESPN3	vs. Winthrop; Quarterfinals	L 66–67	21–11	HTC Center (1,773); Conway, SC
College Basketball Invitational
03/18/2015*; 8:00 pm	at Delaware State; First round	W 78–57	22–11	Memorial Hall (1,038); Dover, DE
03/23/2015*; 7:00 pm	at Vermont; Quarterfinals	L 71–78	22–12	Patrick Gym (2,252); Burlington, VT
*Non-conference game. ^{#}Rankings from AP Poll. (#) Tournament seedings in parentheses. All times are in Eastern Time.
