= 2014–15 High Point Panthers men's basketball team =

American college basketball season

2014–15 High Point Panthers men's basketball

Big South regular season co–champions Rainbow Classic champions

CIT, Second round
- Conference: Big South Conference
- Record: 23–10 (13–5 Big South)
- Head coach: Scott Cherry (6th season)
- Assistant coaches: Ahmad Dorsett; Neill Berry; Trey Brown
- Home arena: Millis Athletic Convocation Center

2014–15 Big South men's basketball standings
	Conf.				Overall
Team	W		L	PCT	W		L	PCT
Charleston Southern	13	–	5	.722	19	–	12	.613
High Point	13	–	5	.722	23	–	10	.697
Coastal Carolina †	12	–	6	.667	24	–	10	.706
Radford	12	–	6	.667	22	–	12	.647
Winthrop	12	–	6	.667	19	–	13	.594
UNC Asheville	10	–	8	.556	15	–	16	.484
Gardner–Webb	10	–	8	.556	20	–	15	.571
Presbyterian	6	–	12	.333	10	–	22	.313
Longwood	5	–	13	.278	11	–	23	.324
Campbell	4	–	14	.222	10	–	22	.313
Liberty	2	–	16	.111	8	–	24	.250
† 2015 Big South tournament winner

The 2014–15 High Point Panthers men's basketball team represented High Point University during the 2014–15 NCAA Division I men's basketball season. The Panthers, led by sixth year head coach Scott Cherry, played their home games at the Millis Athletic Convocation Center and were members of the Big South Conference. They finished the season 23–10, 13–5 in Big South play to finish in a tie for the Big South regular season championship. They lost in the quarterfinals of the Big South tournament to Gardner–Webb. They were invited to the CollegeInsider.com Tournament where they defeated Maryland Eastern Shore in the first round before losing in the second round to Eastern Kentucky.

== Roster ==
Number	Name	Position	Height	Weight	Year	Hometown
0	John Brown	Forward	6–8	205	RS-Junior	Jacksonville, Florida
1	Brian Richardson	Guard	6–4	175	Senior	Wilson, North Carolina
2	Austin White	Guard	6–0	180	Freshman	South Orange, New Jersey
5	DeAndre Barber	Guard	6–2	185	Freshman	Virginia Beach, Virginia
10	Tarique Thompson	Forward	6–5	210	Sophomore	Raeford, North Carolina
11	Haiishen McIntyre	Guard	6–2	175	Junior	Harrisburg, Pennsylvania
12	Jorge Perez-Laham	Guard	6–1	187	Sophomore	Canóvanas, Puerto Rico
15	Lorenzo Cugini	Forward	6–7	225	Junior	Stow, Ohio
20	K.J. James	Forward	6–6	220	Freshman	Charleston, South Carolina
21	Quincy Drye	Guard	6–2	190	Senior	Durham, North Carolina
22	Adam Weary	Guard	6–3	205	Junior	Memphis, Tennessee
23	Devante Wallace	Guard	6–5	185	Senior	Baltimore, Maryland
24	Anthony Lindauer	Guard	6–3	170	Sophomore	Moline, Illinois
33	Miles Bowman	Forward	6–6	215	Junior	Winston-Salem, North Carolina
35	Tré Duncan	Guard	6–0	210	Senior	Millersville, Maryland

== Schedule ==
Date time, TV	Opponent	Result	Record	Site (attendance) city, state
Regular season
11/14/2014*; 9:30 pm	vs. Cal State Bakersfield; Rainbow Classic	W 100–99 ^{4OT}	1–0	Stan Sheriff Center (5,875); Honolulu, HI
11/15/2014*; 9:30 pm	vs. Arkansas–Pine Bluff; Rainbow Classic	W 74–62	2–0	Stan Sheriff Center (6,070); Honolulu, HI
11/18/2014*; 5:00 am, ESPN2	at Hawaii; Rainbow Classic; ESPN College Hoops Tip-Off Marathon	W 62–54	3–0	Stan Sheriff Center (5,805); Honolulu, HI
11/22/2014*; 1:00 pm	at Richmond	L 56–80	3–1	Robins Center (5,877); Richmond, Virginia
11/25/2014*; 7:00 pm	William Peace	W 88–71	4–1	Millis Center (1,133); High Point, North Carolina
11/28/2014*; 7:00 pm, ESPN3	at Clemson	L 59–62	4–2	Littlejohn Coliseum (6,767); Clemson, South Carolina
12/01/2014*; 7:00 pm	at UNC Greensboro	W 76–68	5–2	Greensboro Coliseum (3,032); Greensboro, North Carolina
12/06/2014*; 7:00 pm	William & Mary	W 66–63	6–2	Millis Center (1,750); High Point, North Carolina
12/10/2014*; 7:00 pm, ESPNU	at No. 12 Ohio State	L 43–97	6–3	Value City Arena (13,012); Columbus, Ohio
12/17/2014*; 7:00 pm	Ferrum	W 106–48	7–3	Millis Center (1,237); High Point, North Carolina
12/20/2014*; 5:00 pm	at James Madison	W 80–71	8–3	JMU Convocation Center (3,661); Harrisonburg, Virginia
12/28/2014*; 3:00 pm	Thomas	W 85–48	9–3	Millis Center (1,327); High Point, North Carolina
12/31/2014; 7:00 pm	Coastal Carolina	L 68–83	9–4 (0–1)	Millis Center (1,561); High Point, North Carolina
01/03/2015; 1:00 pm	at Winthrop	W 90–87	10–4 (1–1)	Winthrop Coliseum (891); Rock Hill, South Carolina
01/08/2015; 7:00 pm	Charleston Southern	W 72–61	11–4 (2–1)	Millis Center (1,213); High Point, North Carolina
01/10/2015; 7:00 pm	Campbell	W 69–62	12–4 (3–1)	Millis Center (1,403); High Point, North Carolina
01/14/2015; 7:00 pm	at Gardner–Webb	W 84–72	13–4 (4–1)	Paul Porter Arena (894); Boiling Springs, North Carolina
01/19/2015; 7:00 pm	Longwood	W 72–67	14–4 (5–1)	Millis Center (1,750); High Point, North Carolina
01/22/2015; 7:00 pm	at Radford	L 66–73	14–5 (5–2)	Dedmon Center (2,832); Radford, Virginia
01/24/2015; 7:00 pm	UNC Asheville	W 72–51	15–5 (6–2)	Millis Center (1,750); High Point, North Carolina
01/26/2015; 7:00 pm	at Presbyterian	W 63–54	16–5 (7–2)	Templeton Center (410); Clinton, South Carolina
01/29/2015; 7:00 pm, ESPN3	at Liberty	W 72–53	17–5 (8–2)	Vines Center (1,939); Lynchburg, Virginia
02/03/2015; 7:00 pm, ESPN3	Radford	L 64–67	17–6 (8–3)	Millis Center (1,527); High Point, North Carolina
02/06/2015; 7:00 pm, ESPNU	at Coastal Carolina	L 60–65	17–7 (8–4)	HTC Center (2,566); Conway, South Carolina
02/11/2015; 7:00 pm	Winthrop	W 73–72	18–7 (9–4)	Millis Center (1,750); High Point, North Carolina
02/14/2015; 4:00 pm	at Campbell	W 63–51	19–7 (10–4)	Gore Arena (2,015); Buies Creek, North Carolina
02/18/2015; 7:00 pm	Gardner–Webb	W 83–62	20–7 (11–4)	Millis Center (1,613); High Point, North Carolina
02/21/2015; 7:00 pm	Presbyterian	W 67–58	21–7 (12–4)	Millis Center (1,750); High Point, North Carolina
02/26/2015; 7:00 pm, ESPNU	at UNC Asheville	W 75–71	22–7 (13–4)	Kimmel Arena (1,819); Asheville, North Carolina
02/28/2015; 4:30 pm	at Charleston Southern	L 93–97 ^{3OT}	22–8 (13–5)	CSU Field House (1,157); Charleston, South Carolina
Big South tournament
03/06/2015; 6:00 pm, ESPN3	vs. Gardner–Webb; Quarterfinals	L 71–72 ^{OT}	22–9	HTC Center (3,275); Conway, South Carolina
CIT
03/18/2015*; 7:00 pm	Maryland Eastern Shore; First round	W 70–64	23–9	Millis Center (1,197); High Point, North Carolina
03/20/2015*; 7:00 pm	at Eastern Kentucky; Second round	L 65–66	23–10	McBrayer Arena (2,300); Richmond, Kentucky
*Non-conference game. ^{#}Rankings from AP Poll. (#) Tournament seedings in parentheses. All times are in Eastern Time.
