= 2014–15 UNC Asheville Bulldogs men's basketball team =

American college basketball season

2014–15 UNC Asheville Bulldogs men's basketball
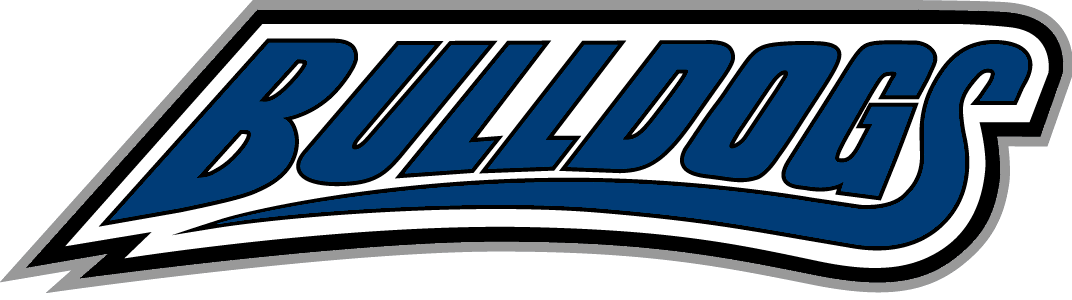
- Conference: Big South Conference
- Record: 15–16 (10–8 Big South)
- Head coach: Nick McDevitt (2nd season)
- Assistant coaches: Brett Carey; Sean Dixon; Logan Johnson
- Home arena: Kimmel Arena

2014–15 Big South men's basketball standings
	Conf.				Overall
Team	W		L	PCT	W		L	PCT
Charleston Southern	13	–	5	.722	19	–	12	.613
High Point	13	–	5	.722	23	–	10	.697
Coastal Carolina †	12	–	6	.667	24	–	10	.706
Radford	12	–	6	.667	22	–	12	.647
Winthrop	12	–	6	.667	19	–	13	.594
UNC Asheville	10	–	8	.556	15	–	16	.484
Gardner–Webb	10	–	8	.556	20	–	15	.571
Presbyterian	6	–	12	.333	10	–	22	.313
Longwood	5	–	13	.278	11	–	23	.324
Campbell	4	–	14	.222	10	–	22	.313
Liberty	2	–	16	.111	8	–	24	.250
† 2015 Big South tournament winner

The 2014–15 UNC Asheville Bulldogs men's basketball team represented the University of North Carolina at Asheville during the 2014–15 NCAA Division I men's basketball season. The Bulldogs, led by second year head coach Nick McDevitt, played their home games at Kimmel Arena and were members of the Big South Conference. They finished the season 15–16, 10–8 in Big South play to finish in a tie for sixth place. They advanced to the quarterfinals of the Big South tournament where they lost to Coastal Carolina.

== Roster ==
Number	Name	Position	Height	Weight	Year	Hometown
2	Alec Wnuk	Forward	6–6	195	Freshman	Cary, North Carolina
10	Kevin Vannatta	Guard	6–3	188	Sophomore	Columbus, Ohio
12	Raekwon Miller	Guard	6–3	160	Freshman	Marion, North Carolina
13	David Robertson	Guard	6–3	195	Sophomore	Cary, North Carolina
14	Ahmad Thomas	Guard	6–5	175	Freshman	Danville, Virginia
15	Andrew Rowsey	Guard	5–10	175	Sophomore	Lexington, Virginia
20	Chaudier Pal	Center	6–9	240	Senior	Rockingham, Western Australia
21	Giacomo Zilli	Forward	6–9	255	Sophomore	Udine, Italy
22	Corey Littlejohn	Guard	6–3	180	Senior	Columbia, South Carolina
25	Jacob Casper	Guard	6–3	190	Sophomore	Asheville, North Carolina
31	Sam Hughes	Forward	6–4	205	Junior	Battleboro, North Carolina
32	Will Weeks	Forward	6–6	220	Sophomore	Charlotte, North Carolina
41	John Cannon	Center	6–10	240	Senior	Burnsville, North Carolina
45	Jaleel Roberts	Center	7–0	225	Senior	Evans, Georgia

== Schedule ==
Date time, TV	Opponent	Result	Record	Site (attendance) city, state
Exhibition
11/08/2014*; 7:30 pm	Brevard	W 81–58		Kimmel Arena (1,507); Asheville, North Carolina
Regular season
11/14/2014*; 7:00 pm, ESPN3	at Wake Forest	L 69–80	0–1	LJVM Coliseum (9,834); Winston-Salem, North Carolina
11/16/2014*; 3:00 pm, ESPN3	at East Carolina	W 83–79	1–1	Williams Arena (4,149); Greenville, North Carolina
11/19/2014*; 7:00 pm	Johnson & Wales	W 87–48	2–1	Kimmel Arena (1,107); Asheville, North Carolina
11/22/2014*; 4:00 pm	at East Tennessee State	L 87–98	2–2	Freedom Hall Civic Center (2,517); Johnson City, Tennessee
11/26/2014*; 8:00 pm, SECN	at South Carolina	L 75–89	2–3	Colonial Life Arena (8,330); Columbia, South Carolina
11/30/2014*; 2:00 pm, ESPN3	Charlotte	L 63–66 ^{OT}	2–4	Kimmel Arena (1,327); Asheville, North Carolina
12/07/2014*; 2:00 pm	Limestone	W 91–66	3–4	Kimmel Arena (1,240); Asheville, North Carolina
12/11/2014*; 7:00 pm	Tusculum	W 78–40	4–4	Kimmel Arena (1,016); Asheville, North Carolina
12/14/2014*; 8:00 pm	at UAB	L 71–79	4–5	Bartow Arena (2,146); Birmingham, Alabama
12/16/2014*; 8:30 pm	at Jacksonville State	L 55–64	4–6	Pete Mathews Coliseum (1,399); Jacksonville, Alabama
12/21/2014*; 2:00 pm	Western Carolina	L 62–66	4–7	Kimmel Arena (2,149); Asheville, North Carolina
12/31/2014; 4:00 pm	at Radford	W 62–60	5–7 (1–0)	Dedmon Center (1,853); Radford, Virginia
01/03/2015; 2:00 pm	Gardner–Webb	W 80–55	6–7 (2–0)	Kimmel Arena (1,321); Asheville, North Carolina
01/08/2015; 7:00 pm	Liberty	W 71–54	7–7 (3–0)	Kimmel Arena (1,255); Asheville, North Carolina
01/14/2015; 7:00 pm	Winthrop	L 69–84	7–8 (3–1)	Kimmel Arena (1,238); Asheville, North Carolina
01/17/2015; 4:00 pm	at Campbell	W 69–65	8–8 (4–1)	Gore Arena (2,258); Buies Creek, North Carolina
01/19/2015; 7:30 pm	at Charleston Southern	L 75–82	8–9 (4–2)	CSU Field House (909); Charleston, South Carolina
01/22/2015; 7:00 pm, ESPNU	Coastal Carolina	W 75–65	9–9 (5–2)	Kimmel Arena (2,263); Asheville, North Carolina
01/24/2015; 7:00 pm	at High Point	L 51–72	9–10 (5–3)	Millis Center (1,750); High Point, North Carolina
01/28/2015; 7:00 pm	at Longwood	W 74–64	10–10 (6–3)	Willett Hall (924); Farmville, Virginia
01/31/2015; 4:30 pm	Campbell	W 70–63	11–10 (7–3)	Kimmel Arena (1,965); Asheville, North Carolina
02/03/2015; 7:00 pm	at Coastal Carolina	L 56–68	11–11 (7–4)	HTC Center (2,451); Conway, South Carolina
02/06/2015; 7:00 pm	Longwood	W 71–56	12–11 (8–4)	Kimmel Arena (1,153); Asheville, North Carolina
02/09/2015; 8:00 pm	at Gardner–Webb	W 92–89	13–12 (9–4)	Paul Porter Arena (1,235); Boiling Springs, North Carolina
02/12/2015; 7:00 pm	Presbyterian	L 65–69	13–12 (9–5)	Kimmel Arena (1,109); Asheville, North Carolina
02/18/2015; 7:00 pm	at Winthrop	L 70–91	13–13 (9–6)	Winthrop Coliseum (1,049); Rock Hill, South Carolina
02/21/2015; 4:30 pm	Radford	L 68–75	13–14 (9–7)	Kimmel Arena (2,464); Asheville, North Carolina
02/26/2015; 7:00 pm	High Point	L 71–75	13–15 (9–8)	Kimmel Arena (1,819); Asheville, North Carolina
02/28/2015; 3:00 pm, ESPN3	at Liberty	W 95–77	14–15 (10–8)	Vines Center (2,478); Lynchburg, Virginia
Big South tournament
03/04/2015; 6:00 pm	vs. Liberty; First round	W 80–70	15–15	HTC Center (1,046); Conway, South Carolina
03/06/2015; 8:30 pm, ESPN3	at Coastal Carolina; Quarterfinals	L 57–74	15–16	HTC Center (3,275); Conway, South Carolina
*Non-conference game. ^{#}Rankings from AP Poll. (#) Tournament seedings in parentheses. All times are in Eastern Time.
