= 2014–15 Auburn Tigers men's basketball team =

American college basketball season

2014–15 Auburn Tigers men's basketball
- Conference: Southeastern Conference
- Record: 15–20 (4–14 SEC)
- Head coach: Bruce Pearl (1st season)
- Assistant coaches: Tony Jones; Chuck Person; Harris Adler
- Captain: KT Harrell
- Home arena: Auburn Arena

2014–15 Southeastern Conference men's basketball standings
	Conf.				Overall
Team	W		L	PCT	W		L	PCT
No. 1 Kentucky †	18	–	0	1.000	38	–	1	.974
No. 21 Arkansas	13	–	5	.722	27	–	9	.750
LSU	11	–	7	.611	22	–	11	.667
Georgia	11	–	7	.611	21	–	12	.636
Texas A&M	11	–	7	.611	21	–	12	.636
Ole Miss	11	–	7	.611	21	–	13	.618
Vanderbilt	9	–	9	.500	21	–	14	.600
Alabama	8	–	10	.444	19	–	15	.559
Florida	8	–	10	.444	16	–	17	.485
Tennessee	7	–	11	.389	16	–	16	.500
South Carolina	6	–	12	.333	17	–	16	.515
Mississippi State	6	–	12	.333	13	–	19	.406
Auburn	4	–	14	.222	15	–	20	.429
Missouri	3	–	15	.167	9	–	23	.281
† 2015 SEC tournament winner Rankings from AP poll

The 2014–15 Auburn Tigers men's basketball team represented Auburn University during the 2014–15 NCAA Division I men's basketball season. The team's head coach was Bruce Pearl, in his first season at Auburn. The team played their home games at the Auburn Arena in Auburn, Alabama as a member of the Southeastern Conference. They finished the season 15–20, 4–14 in SEC play to finish in 13th place. They advanced to the semifinals of the SEC tournament where they lost to Kentucky.

== Departures ==
Name	Number	Pos.	Height	Weight	Year	Hometown	Notes
Ashaun Dixon-Tatum	0	C	7'0"	226	Senior	Anderson, IN	Graduated
Allen Payne	2	F	6'6"	225	Senior	Cincinnati, OH	Graduated/signed to play professionally in Ireland
Chris Denson	3	G	6'2"	181	Senior	Columbia, GA	Graduated/signed to play professionally in Holland
Dion Wade	11	G	6'5"	170	Freshman	Antwerp, Belgium	Transferred to Miami (OH)
Benas Griciunas	31	C	7'0"	225	Freshman	Šilutė, Lithuania	Transferred to Charlotte
Chris Griffin	32	F	6'7"	229	Junior	Tallahassee, FL	Left Team for Personal Reasons
Ron Delph	33	C	7'0"	240	Freshman	Winter Haven, FL	Suspended Indefinitely

=== Incoming transfers ===
Name	Number	Pos.	Height	Weight	Year	Hometown	Previous School
Cinmeon Bowers	5	F	6'7"	278	Junior	Racine, WI	Junior College transfer from Chipola College.
Kareem Canty	10	G	6'1"	185	RS Sophomore	Harlem, NY	Transferred from Marshall. Under NCAA transfer rules, Canty will have to redshirt for the 2014–15 season. Will have three years of remaining eligibility.
K.C. Ross-Miller	12	G	6'1"	175	RS Senior	Grand Prairie, TX	Transferred from New Mexico State. Will be eligible to play immediately since Ross-Miller graduated from New Mexico State.
Antoine Mason	14	G	6'3"	210	RS Senior	Queens, NY	Transferred from Niagara. Will be eligible to play immediately since Mason graduated from Niagara.

== Recruits ==
College recruiting
Name	Hometown	School	Height	Weight	Commit date
Jack Purchase; PF	Melbourne, AUS	Carey Baptist Grammar School	6 ft 10 in (2.08 m)	200 lb (91 kg)	Sep 5, 2013
Jack Purchase; PF	Recruit ratings: Scout: Rivals: 247Sports: ESPN:				
T.J. Lang; SF	Mobile, AL	McGill-Toolen	6 ft 7 in (2.01 m)	195 lb (88 kg)	Sep 5, 2013
T.J. Lang; SF	Recruit ratings: Scout: Rivals: 247Sports: ESPN:				
Trayvon Reed; C	Snellville, GA	LCA	7 ft 1 in (2.16 m)	220 lb (100 kg)	Aug 28, 2014
Trayvon Reed; C	Recruit ratings: Scout: Rivals: 247Sports: ESPN:				
Overall recruit ranking: Scout: Not Ranked Rivals: Not Ranked ESPN: Not Ranked
Note: In many cases, Scout, Rivals, 247Sports, On3, and ESPN may conflict in their listings of height and weight.; In these cases, the average was taken. ESPN grades are on a 100-point scale.; Sources: "Auburn 2014 Basketball Commitments". Rivals.; "2014 Auburn Basketball Commits". Scout.; "ESPN". ESPN.; "Scout.com Team Recruiting Rankings". Scout.; "2014 Team Ranking". Rivals.

== Roster ==
2014–15 Auburn Tigers men's basketball team
Players
Coaches

Pos.	#	Name	Height	Weight	Year	Previous school	Hometown
G	00	Malcolm Canada	6 ft 3 in (1.91 m)	225 lb (102 kg)	Sr	Ellsworth CC	Austin, TX
G	1	KT Harrell (C)	6 ft 4 in (1.93 m)	212 lb (96 kg)	Sr	Virginia	Montgomery, AL
F	5	Cinmeon Bowers	6 ft 7 in (2.01 m)	278 lb (126 kg)	Jr	Chipola College	Racine, WI
G	10	Kareem Canty (redshirt)	6 ft 0 in (1.83 m)	183 lb (83 kg)	So	Marshall	Harlem, NY
G	12	KC Ross-Miller	6 ft 0 in (1.83 m)	178 lb (81 kg)	RS Sr	New Mexico State	Grand Prairie, TX
G	13	Tahj Shamsid-Deen	5 ft 9 in (1.75 m)	170 lb (77 kg)	So	Columbia HS	Decatur, GA
G	14	Antoine Mason	6 ft 1 in (1.85 m)	216 lb (98 kg)	RS Sr	Niagara	Queens, NY
F	20	Alex Thompson	6 ft 9 in (2.06 m)	210 lb (95 kg)	So	Houston Academy	Dothan, AL
G	22	C. J. Holmes	6 ft 1 in (1.85 m)	192 lb (87 kg)	Jr	IMG Academy	Washington, D.C.
G	23	TJ Lang	6 ft 7 in (2.01 m)	193 lb (88 kg)	Fr	McGill Toolen	Mobile, AL
F	24	Jack Purchase	6 ft 8 in (2.03 m)	198 lb (90 kg)	Fr	Carey Grammar	Melbourne, Australia
F	25	Jordon Granger	6 ft 8 in (2.03 m)	210 lb (95 kg)	Jr	McCluer North	St. Louis, MO
F	31	Devin Waddell	6 ft 5 in (1.96 m)	221 lb (100 kg)	Jr	Hargrave Military Academy	Summerfield, NC
C	41	Matthew Atewe	6 ft 8 in (2.03 m)	250 lb (113 kg)	So	Notre Dame Prep	Brampton, ON

Head coach

- Bruce Pearl (Boston College)

Assistant coach(es)

- Tony Jones (Concordia)
- Chuck Person (Auburn)
- Harris Adler (Rowan)

Legend

- (C) Team captain
- (S) Suspended
- (I) Ineligible
- (W) Walk-on
- Injured
- Current redshirt

Roster

== Schedule and results ==
Date time, TV	Opponent	Result	Record	Site (attendance) city, state	
Exhibition
11/07/2014*; 8:30 pm		West Alabama	W 94–58		Auburn Arena (8,523); Auburn, AL
Non-conference games
11/14/2014*; 9:00 pm, ESPNU		Milwaukee; MGM Grand Main Event	W 83–73	1–0	Auburn Arena (8,114); Auburn, AL
11/18/2014*; Midnight, ESPN2		at Colorado; ESPN Tip-Off Marathon	L 59–90	1–1	Coors Events Center (9,834); Boulder, CO
11/21/2014*; 6:00 pm, FSN		Louisiana–Lafayette; MGM Grand Main Event	W 105–80	2–1	Auburn Arena (8,120); Auburn, AL
11/24/2014*; 10:00 pm, ESPNU		vs. Tulsa; MGM Grand Main Event semifinals	L 35–53	2–2	MGM Grand Garden Arena (1,507); Paradise, NV
11/26/2014*; 8:00 pm, ESPN3		vs. Oregon State; MGM Grand Main Event	W 71–69	3–2	MGM Grand Garden Arena (1,712); Paradise, NV
12/03/2014*; 8:00 pm, SECN		at Texas Tech; Big 12/SEC Challenge	L 44–46	3–3	United Supermarkets Arena (7,040); Lubbock, TX
12/05/2014*; 7:00 pm, FSN		Coastal Carolina	L 54–58	3–4	Auburn Arena (7,964); Auburn, AL
12/14/2014*; 3:00 pm, ESPN3		at Clemson	L 61–72	3–5	Littlejohn Coliseum (7,140); Clemson, SC
12/17/2014*; 8:00 pm, SECN		Winthrop	W 80–62	4–5	Auburn Arena (5,323); Auburn, AL
12/20/2014*; 5:00 pm, SECN		Xavier	W 89–88 ^{2OT}	5–5	Auburn Arena (7,975); Auburn, AL
12/23/2014*; 7:00 pm, SECN+		Texas Southern	W 61–60	6–5	Auburn Arena (7,323); Auburn, AL
12/29/2014*; 8:00 pm, SECN		Middle Tennessee	W 64–48	7–5	Auburn Arena (6,752); Auburn, AL
01/03/2015*; Noon, SECN		North Alabama	W 82–61	8–5	Auburn Arena (8,169); Auburn, AL
Conference games
01/06/2015; 8:00 pm, ESPNU		at Vanderbilt	L 52–64	8–6 (0–1)	Memorial Gymnasium (10,502); Nashville, TN
01/10/2015; 6:00 pm, SECN		Missouri	W 85–79	9–6 (1–1)	Auburn Arena (8,365); Auburn, AL
01/15/2015; 6:00 pm, ESPN2		at Florida	L 55–75	9–7 (1–2)	O'Connell Center (10,346); Gainesville, FL
01/17/2015; 7:30 pm, SECN		South Carolina	W 71–68	10–7 (2–2)	Auburn Arena (9,121); Auburn, AL
01/21/2015; 8:00 pm, SECN		Mississippi State	L 71–78	10–8 (2–3)	Auburn Arena (8,083); Auburn, AL
01/24/2015; 7:30 pm, SECN		at Alabama; Iron Bowl of Basketball	L 55−57	10–9 (2–4)	Coleman Coliseum (15,383); Tuscaloosa, AL
01/27/2015; 8:00 pm, SECN		Texas A&M	L 61–71	10–10 (2–5)	Auburn Arena (7,184); Auburn, AL
01/31/2015; 11:00 am, ESPN2		at Tennessee	L 63–71	10–11 (2–6)	Thompson–Boling Arena (18,439); Knoxville, TN
02/05/2015; 6:00 pm, ESPN2		at LSU	W 81–77	11–11 (3–6)	Maravich Center (8,672); Baton Rouge, LA
02/07/2015; 5:30 pm, SECN		Ole Miss	L 79–86	11–12 (3–7)	Auburn Arena (9,121); Auburn, AL
02/10/2015; 8:00 pm, ESPNU		No. 24 Arkansas	L 87–101	11–13 (3–8)	Auburn Arena (6,526); Auburn, AL
02/14/2015; 1:00 pm, FSN		at Georgia	W 69–68	12–13 (4–8)	Stegeman Coliseum (10,523); Athens, GA
02/17/2015; 8:00 pm, ESPNU		Alabama; Iron Bowl of Basketball	L 68–79	12–14 (4–9)	Auburn Arena (9,121); Auburn, AL
02/21/2015; 6:00 pm, ESPN		at No. 1 Kentucky	L 75–110	12–15 (4–10)	Rupp Arena (23,403); Lexington, KY
02/24/2015; 6:00 pm, ESPNU		LSU	L 61–84	12–16 (4–11)	Auburn Arena (6,651); Auburn, AL
02/28/2015; 7:30 pm, SECN		at Texas A&M	L 55–80	12–17 (4–12)	Reed Arena (9,809); College Station, TX
03/03/2015; 8:00 pm, SECN		at Missouri	L 61–63	12–18 (4–13)	Mizzou Arena (9,121); Columbia, MO
03/07/2015; 3:00 pm, SECN		Georgia	L 61–64	12–19 (4–14)	Auburn Arena (9,121); Auburn, AL
SEC Tournament
03/11/2015; 6:00 pm, SECN	(13)	vs. (12) Mississippi State; First Round	W 74–68	13–19	Bridgestone Arena (10,039); Nashville, TN
03/12/2015; 2:30 pm, SECN	(13)	vs. (5) Texas A&M; Second Round	W 66–59	14–19	Bridgestone Arena (10,563); Nashville, TN
03/13/2015; 2:30 pm, SECN	(13)	vs. (4) LSU; Quarterfinals	W 73–70 ^{OT}	15–19	Bridgestone Arena (18,205); Nashville, TN
03/14/2015; Noon, ESPN	(13)	vs. (1) No. 1 Kentucky; Semifinals	L 67–91	15–20	Bridgestone Arena (19,232); Nashville, TN
*Non-conference game. ^{#}Rankings from AP Poll. (#) Tournament seedings in parentheses. All times are in Central Time.
