= 2014–15 LSU Tigers basketball team =

American college basketball season

2014–15 LSU Tigers men's basketball

NCAA tournament, round of 64
- Conference: Southeastern Conference
- Record: 22–11 (11–7 SEC)
- Head coach: Johnny Jones (3rd season)
- Assistant coaches: David Patrick; Eric Musselman; Charlie Leonard
- Home arena: Pete Maravich Assembly Center

2014–15 Southeastern Conference men's basketball standings
	Conf.				Overall
Team	W		L	PCT	W		L	PCT
No. 1 Kentucky †	18	–	0	1.000	38	–	1	.974
No. 21 Arkansas	13	–	5	.722	27	–	9	.750
LSU	11	–	7	.611	22	–	11	.667
Georgia	11	–	7	.611	21	–	12	.636
Texas A&M	11	–	7	.611	21	–	12	.636
Ole Miss	11	–	7	.611	21	–	13	.618
Vanderbilt	9	–	9	.500	21	–	14	.600
Alabama	8	–	10	.444	19	–	15	.559
Florida	8	–	10	.444	16	–	17	.485
Tennessee	7	–	11	.389	16	–	16	.500
South Carolina	6	–	12	.333	17	–	16	.515
Mississippi State	6	–	12	.333	13	–	19	.406
Auburn	4	–	14	.222	15	–	20	.429
Missouri	3	–	15	.167	9	–	23	.281
† 2015 SEC tournament winner Rankings from AP poll

The 2014–15 LSU Tigers basketball team represented Louisiana State University during the 2014–15 NCAA Division I men's basketball season. The team's head coach was Johnny Jones, who was in his third season at LSU. They played their home games at Pete Maravich Assembly Center as members of the Southeastern Conference. They finished the season 22–11, 11–7 in SEC play to finish in a four-way tie for third place. They lost in the quarterfinals of the SEC tournament to Auburn. They received an at-large bid to the NCAA tournament where they lost in the second round to NC State.

== Previous season and offseason ==
LSU completed the 2013–14 season with an overall record of 20–14 and a 9–9 record in Southeastern Conference play. After receiving a bye for the first round of the SEC tournament, the Tigers defeated the Alabama Crimson Tide in the second round. They were eliminated by the Kentucky Wildcats in the quarterfinals. They were invited to the National Invitation Tournament where they defeated San Francisco in the first round. They were eliminated by SMU in the second round.

The Tigers lost several key players following the end of the season. Andre Stringer, the team's leading three-point shooter, completed his senior season. Junior forward Johnny O'Bryant III, the team leader in scoring and rebounding, elected to forgo his senior season and enter the 2014 NBA draft, where he was selected in the second round by the Milwaukee Bucks. In a somewhat surprising move, LSU chose not to renew the scholarship of point guard Anthony Hickey, who led the team in assists and steals, for the 2014–15 season. Hickey transferred to Oklahoma State, where he received a waiver from the NCAA to allow him to play immediately.

Keith Hornsby, who transferred to LSU from UNC Asheville and was required to sit out the prior season, will be eligible to play beginning with the 2014–15 season. The Tigers also signed a strong recruiting class, which included Elbert Robinson, one of the top-rated centers in the country, and Josh Gray, a junior college transfer at guard who led the NJCAA in scoring in 2013–14 with 34.7 points per game.

== Departures ==
Name	Number	Pos.	Height	Weight	Year	Hometown	Notes
Anthony Hickey	1	G	5'11"	182	Junior	Hopkinsville, KY	Transferred to Oklahoma State
Johnny O'Bryant III	2	F	6'9"	256	Junior	Cleveland, MS	2nd round (36th overall) draft pick of the Milwaukee Bucks
Shavon Coleman	5	F	6'5"	195	Senior	Thibodaux, LA	Graduated
Andre Stringer	10	F	5'10"	190	Senior	Jackson, MS	Graduated
Shane Hammink	11	F	6'7"	217	Sophomore	Millingen aan de Rijn, Netherlands	Transferred to Valparaiso
Malik Morgan	24	G	6'4"	199	Sophomore	River Ridge, LA	Transferred to Tulane

== Recruits ==
College recruiting information
Name	Hometown	School	Height	Weight	Commit date
Elbert Robinson; C	Garland, Texas	Lakeview Centennial High School	6 ft 11 in (2.11 m)	270 lb (120 kg)	Oct 8, 2013
Elbert Robinson; C	Recruit ratings: Scout: Rivals: 247Sports: ESPN:				
Aaron Epps; C	Tioga, Louisiana	Tioga High School	6 ft 9 in (2.06 m)	215 lb (98 kg)	Sep 23, 2013
Aaron Epps; C	Recruit ratings: Scout: Rivals: 247Sports: ESPN:				
Jalyn Patterson; PG	Alpharetta, Georgia	Montverde Academy	6 ft 1 in (1.85 m)	170 lb (77 kg)	Oct 13, 2013
Jalyn Patterson; PG	Recruit ratings: Scout: Rivals: 247Sports: ESPN:				
Josh Gray; PG	Lake Charles, Louisiana	Odessa College	6 ft 1 in (1.85 m)	175 lb (79 kg)	Nov 20, 2013
Josh Gray; PG	Recruit ratings: Scout: Rivals: 247Sports: ESPN:				
Overall recruit ranking: Scout: Not Ranked Rivals: Not Ranked ESPN: 35th
Note: In many cases, Scout, Rivals, 247Sports, On3, and ESPN may conflict in their listings of height and weight.; In these cases, the average was taken. ESPN grades are on a 100-point scale.; Sources: "LSU 2014 Basketball Commitments". Rivals.; "2014 LSU Basketball Commits". Scout.; "ESPN". ESPN.; "Scout.com Team Recruiting Rankings". Scout.; "2014 Team Ranking". Rivals.

== Roster ==
2014–15 LSU Tigers men's basketball team
Players
Coaches

Pos.	#	Name	Height	Weight	Year	Hometown
F	1	Jarell Martin	6 ft 10 in (2.08 m)	235 lb (107 kg)	So	Baton Rouge, Louisiana
C	3	Elbert Robinson III	7 ft 1 in (2.16 m)	270 lb (122 kg)	Fr	Garland, Texas
G	4	Keith Hornsby	6 ft 4 in (1.93 m)	210 lb (95 kg)	RS Jr	Williamsburg, Virginia
G	5	Josh Gray	6 ft 1 in (1.85 m)	183 lb (83 kg)	Jr	Lake Charles, Louisiana
G	10	Henry Shortess (W)	5 ft 9 in (1.75 m)	163 lb (74 kg)	So	Baton Rouge, Louisiana
G	13	Antonio Robinson (W)	6 ft 1 in (1.85 m)	170 lb (77 kg)	Sr	Bossier City, Louisiana
G	15	Jalyn Patterson	6 ft 0 in (1.83 m)	175 lb (79 kg)	Fr	Alpharetta, Georgia
F	20	Brian Bridgewater	6 ft 5 in (1.96 m)	265 lb (120 kg)	So	Baton Rouge, Louisiana
F	21	Aaron Epps	6 ft 9 in (2.06 m)	208 lb (94 kg)	Fr	Ball, Louisiana
C	22	Darcy Malone	7 ft 0 in (2.13 m)	245 lb (111 kg)	So	Canberra, Australia
F	25	Jordan Mickey	6 ft 8 in (2.03 m)	235 lb (107 kg)	So	Dallas, Texas
F	31	John Odo	6 ft 10 in (2.08 m)	245 lb (111 kg)	Sr	Lagos, Nigeria
G	32	Carlton Speight (W)	6 ft 4 in (1.93 m)	200 lb (91 kg)	Fr	New Orleans, Louisiana
F	45	Brandon Eddlestone (W)	6 ft 8 in (2.03 m)	245 lb (111 kg)	So	Slidell, Louisiana
G	55	Tim Quarterman	6 ft 6 in (1.98 m)	187 lb (85 kg)	So	Savannah, Georgia

Head coach

- Johnny Jones (LSU)

Assistant coach(es)

- David Patrick (Louisiana-Lafayette)
- Eric Musselman (San Diego)
- Charlie Leonard (Christian Brothers)

Legend

- (C) Team captain
- (S) Suspended
- (I) Ineligible
- (W) Walk-on
- Injured
- Current redshirt

Roster
Last update: 2014-11-13

== Schedule and results ==
Date time, TV	Rank^{#}	Opponent^{#}	Result	Record	High points	High rebounds	High assists	Site (attendance) city, state
Exhibition
11/07/2014*; 7:00 pm		Morehouse	W 71–47		22 – Martin	11 – Mickey	3 – Tied	Maravich Center (3,631); Baton Rouge, LA
Non-conference regular season
11/15/2014*; 12:00 pm		Gardner–Webb	W 93–82	1–0	21 – Tied	11 – Martin	6 – Mickey	Maravich Center (6,745); Baton Rouge, LA
11/18/2014*; 8:30 pm, ESPN2		Texas Tech; ESPN College Hoops Tip-Off Marathon	W 69–64 ^{OT}	2–0	18 – Mickey	14 – Mickey	4 – Tied	Maravich Center (8,010); Baton Rouge, LA
11/21/2014*; 5:30 pm, CBSSN		vs. Old Dominion; Paradise Jam first round	L 61–70	2–1	17 – Martin	11 – Martin	4 – Gray	Sports and Fitness Center (1,910); St. Thomas, VI
11/22/2014*; 4:00 pm		vs. Weber State; Paradise Jam second round	W 72–58	3–1	27 – Mickey	14 – Mickey	4 – Tied	Sports and Fitness Center (1,968); St. Thomas, VI
11/24/2014*; 3:00 pm		vs. Clemson; Paradise Jam fifth place game	L 61–64	3–2	18 – Mickey	10 – Mickey	5 – Gray	Sports and Fitness Center (1,342); St. Thomas, VI
11/29/2014*; 7:00 pm		McNeese State	W 83–72	4–2	26 – Martin	10 – Martin	7 – Gray	Maravich Center (7,034); Baton Rouge, LA
12/02/2014*; 6:00 pm, SECN		Massachusetts	W 82–60	5–2	25 – Gray	10 – Mickey	5 – Gray	Maravich Center (6,962); Baton Rouge, LA
12/04/2014*; 6:00 pm, ESPN2		at No. 16 West Virginia; Big 12/SEC Challenge	W 74–73	6–2	21 – Quarterman	14 – Martin	7 – Gray	WVU Coliseum (10,802); Morgantown, WV
12/13/2014*; 6:00 pm, SECN		Sam Houston State	W 76–67	7–2	21 – Mickey	15 – Mickey	4 – Quarterman	Maravich Center (7,295); Baton Rouge, LA
12/18/2014*; 8:00 pm, CBSSN		at UAB	W 79–70	8–2	25 – Martin	8 – Mickey	8 – Quarterman	Bartow Arena (6,054); Birmingham, AL
12/22/2014*; 8:00 pm, SECN		College of Charleston	W 71–47	9–2	18 – Martin	10 – Mickey	4 – Patterson	Maravich Center (7,808); Baton Rouge, LA
12/29/2014*; 6:00 pm, SECN		Southern Miss	W 87–67	10–2	24 – Martin	14 – Quarterman	6 – Quarterman	Maravich Center (9,089); Baton Rouge, LA
01/03/2015*; 6:00 pm, SECN		Savannah State	W 75–59	11–2	26 – Martin	14 – Mickey	8 – Gray	Maravich Center (7,647); Baton Rouge, LA
SEC regular season
01/08/2015; 6:00 pm, ESPN2		at Missouri	L 67–74 ^{OT}	11–3 (0–1)	19 – Quarterman	17 – Mickey	3 – Tied	Mizzou Arena (7,509); Columbia, MO
01/10/2015; 8:00 pm, ESPNU		Georgia	W 87–84 ^{2OT}	12–3 (1–1)	27 – Quarterman	8 – Mickey	6 – Gray	Maravich Center (9,217); Baton Rouge, LA
01/14/2015; 6:00 pm, SECN		at Ole Miss	W 75–71	13–3 (2–1)	23 – Hornsby	14 – Martin	10 – Gray	Tad Smith Coliseum (7,030); Oxford, MS
01/17/2015; 11:00 am, ESPN2		Texas A&M	L 64–67	13–4 (2–2)	17 – Mickey	8 – Tied	5 – Gray	Maravich Center (10,278); Baton Rouge, LA
01/20/2015; 6:00 pm, ESPN		at Florida	W 79–61	14–4 (3–2)	22 – Martin	14 – Mickey	8 – Quarterman	O'Connell Center (10,160); Gainesville, FL
01/24/2015; 5:00 pm, ESPNU		at Vanderbilt	W 79–75 ^{OT}	15–4 (4–2)	25 – Mickey	12 – Martin	3 – Tied	Memorial Gymnasium (9,392); Nashville, TN
01/28/2015; 6:00 pm, SECN		South Carolina	W 64–58	16–4 (5–2)	16 – Quarterman	11 – Martin	3 – Tied	Maravich Center (9,518); Baton Rouge, LA
01/31/2015; 1:00 pm, SECN		at Mississippi State	L 67–73	16–5 (5–3)	25 – Mickey	20 – Mickey	3 – Tied	Humphrey Coliseum (6,657); Starkville, MS
02/05/2015; 6:00 pm, ESPN2		Auburn	L 77–81	16–6 (5–4)	23 – Mickey	16 – Martin	6 – Gray	Maravich Center (8,672); Baton Rouge, LA
02/07/2015; 5:00 pm, ESPN2		Alabama	W 71–60	17–6 (6–4)	24 – Mickey	12 – Mickey	4 – Patterson	Maravich Center (10,355); Baton Rouge, LA
02/10/2015; 6:00 pm, ESPN		No. 1 Kentucky	L 69–71	17–7 (6–5)	21 – Martin	11 – Martin	7 – Quarterman	Maravich Center (13,111); Baton Rouge, LA
02/14/2015; 3:00 pm, SECN		at Tennessee	W 73–55	18–7 (7–5)	20 – Mickey	11 – Mickey	7 – Hornsby	Thompson–Boling Arena (16,051); Knoxville, TN
02/17/2015; 8:00 pm, SECN		at Texas A&M	L 62–68	18–8 (7–6)	13 – Martin	6 – Tied	8 – Quarterman	Reed Arena (6,701); College Station, TX
02/21/2015; 12:00 pm, CBS		Florida	W 70–63	19–8 (8–6)	28 – Martin	13 – Martin	3 – Tied	Maravich Center (9,203); Baton Rouge, LA
02/24/2015; 6:00 pm, ESPNU		at Auburn	W 84–61	20–8 (9–6)	25 – Martin	12 – Martin	7 – Patterson	Auburn Arena (6,651); Auburn, AL
02/28/2015; 1:00 pm, FSN		Ole Miss	W 73–63	21–8 (10–6)	18 – Tied	12 – Martin	10 – Quarterman	Maravich Center (10,683); Baton Rouge, LA
03/04/2015; 6:00 pm, SECN		Tennessee	L 63–78	21–9 (10–7)	25 – Hornsby	8 – Mickey	7 – Quarterman	Maravich Center (8,736); Baton Rouge, LA
03/07/2015; 1:00 pm, ESPN		at No. 18 Arkansas	W 81–78	22–9 (11–7)	27 – Martin	8 – Martin	6 – Gray	Bud Walton Arena (18,966); Fayetteville, AR
SEC Tournament
03/13/2015; 2:30 pm, SECN	(4)	vs. (13) Auburn; Quarterfinals	L 70–73 ^{OT}	22–10	24 – Hornsby	16 – Martin	3 – Tied	Bridgestone Arena (18,205); Nashville, TN
NCAA tournament
03/19/2015*; 8:20 pm, TBS	(9 E)	vs. (8 E) NC State; Second round	L 65–66	22–11	17 – Quarterman	14 – Mickey	7 – Quarterman	Consol Energy Center (16,170); Pittsburgh, PA
*Non-conference game. ^{#}Rankings from AP Poll. (#) Tournament seedings in parentheses. All times are in Central Time. (#) during NCAA Tournament is seed with Region E=East.

== See also ==
2014–15 LSU Lady Tigers basketball team
