= Gregg Nibert =

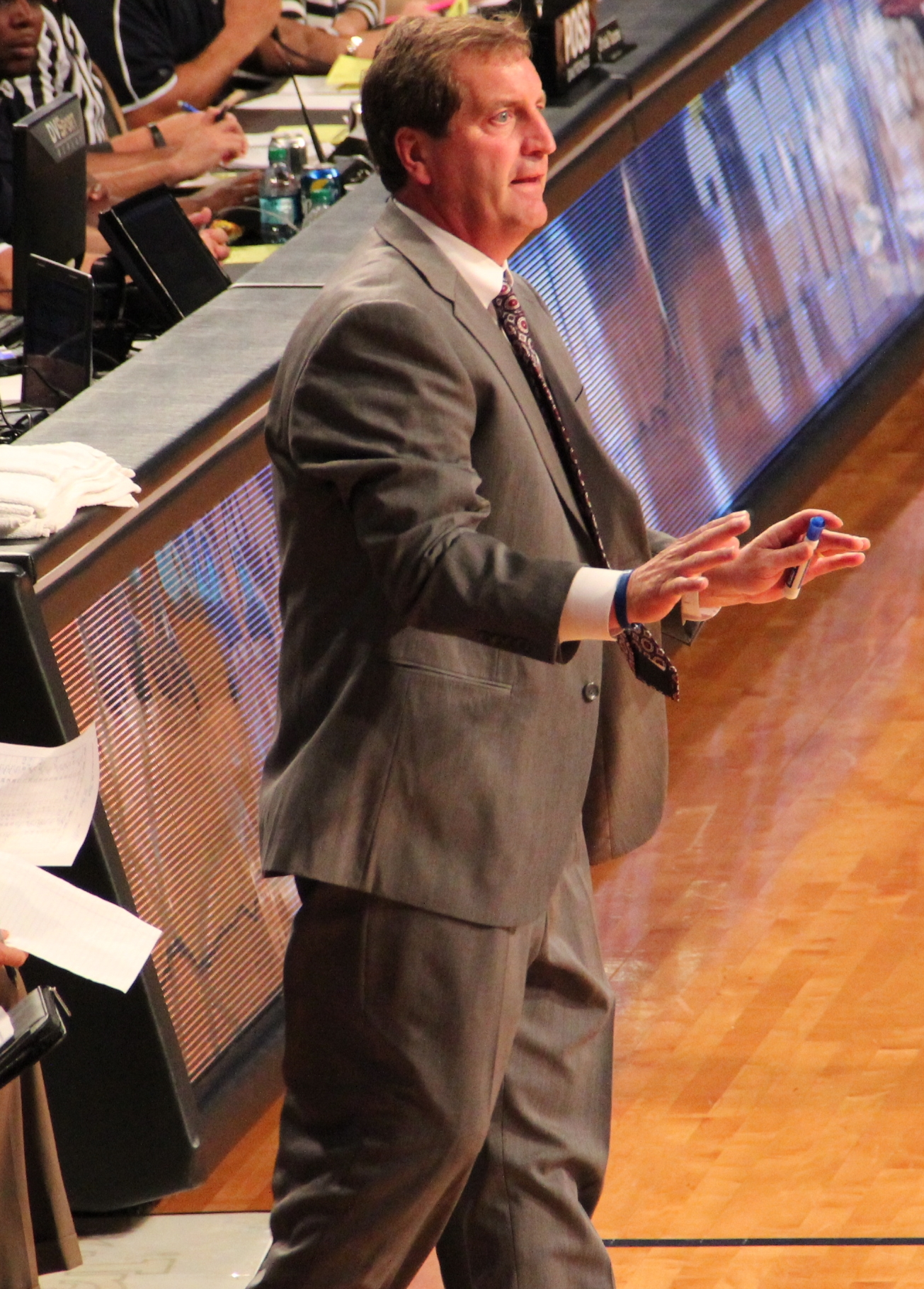
- Nibert in 2013

Biographical details
- Born: July 20, 1957 (age 69)

Playing career
- 1975–1979: Marietta

Coaching career (HC unless noted)
- 1979–1981: Rice (asst.)
- 1981–1984: Presbyterian (asst.)
- 1984–1989: Furman (asst.)
- 1989–2017: Presbyterian

Head coaching record
- Overall: 419–409 (.506)

Gregg Nibert (born July 20, 1957) is the former head men's basketball coach at Presbyterian College. He is the all-time winningest coach in Blue Hose history. He resigned April 12, 2017 after 28 seasons as head coach.

== Head coaching record ==
Record table
Season	Team	Overall	Conference	Standing	Postseason
Presbyterian Blue Hose (South Atlantic Conference) (1989–2007)
1989–90	Presbyterian	17–13	8–6	T–3rd	
1990–91	Presbyterian	12–16	6–8	6th	
1991–92	Presbyterian	18–13	8–6	T–3rd	
1992–93	Presbyterian	27–5	13–1	1st	NAIA Division I First Round
1993–94	Presbyterian	14–13	8–6	T–2nd	
1994–95	Presbyterian	15–14	8–6	5th	
1995–96	Presbyterian	19–11	8–6	2nd	NCAA Div II Tournament
1996–97	Presbyterian	20–7	13–1	1st	NCAA Div II Tournament
1997–98	Presbyterian	16–12	9–5	T–2nd	
1998–99	Presbyterian	20–10	10–4	2nd	
1999–00	Presbyterian	20–15	10–6	3rd	
2000–01	Presbyterian	19–10	10–4	3rd	
2001–02	Presbyterian	12–16	4–10	6th	
2002–03	Presbyterian	27–9	9–5	4th	NCAA Div II Tournament
2003–04	Presbyterian	16–12	7–7	5th	
2004–05	Presbyterian	18–11	8–6	T–3rd	
2005–06	Presbyterian	25–10	10–4	2nd	NCAA Div II Tournament
2006–07	Presbyterian	20–19	12–4	2nd	
Presbyterian:		335–216 (.608)	161–95 (.629)		
Presbyterian (Independent) (2007–2008)
2007–08	Presbyterian	5–25			
Presbyterian (Big South Conference) (2008–2017)
2008–09	Presbyterian	12–17	9–9	T–5th	
2009–10	Presbyterian	5–26	2–16	10th	
2010–11	Presbyterian	13–18	7–11	7th	
2011–12	Presbyterian	14–15	8–10	6th	
2012–13	Presbyterian	8–24	4–12	6th (South)	
2013–14	Presbyterian	6–26	2–14	6th (South)	
2014–15	Presbyterian	10–22	6–12	8th	
2015–16	Presbyterian	11–20	5–13	T–8th	
2016–17	Presbyterian	5–25	1–17	10th	
Presbyterian:		84–183 (.315)	44–114 (.278)		
Total:		419–409 (.506)			
National champion Postseason invitational champion Conference regular season champion Conference regular season and conference tournament champion Division regular season champion Division regular season and conference tournament champion Conference tournament champion
