= 2014–15 Longwood Lancers men's basketball team =

American college basketball season

2014–15 Longwood Lancers men's basketball
- Conference: Big South Conference
- Record: 11–23 (5–13 Big South)
- Head coach: Jayson Gee (2nd season)
- Assistant coaches: Jake Luhn (2nd season); Craig Carter (1st season); Samba Johnson (1st season)
- Home arena: Willett Hall

2014–15 Big South men's basketball standings
	Conf.				Overall
Team	W		L	PCT	W		L	PCT
Charleston Southern	13	–	5	.722	19	–	12	.613
High Point	13	–	5	.722	23	–	10	.697
Coastal Carolina †	12	–	6	.667	24	–	10	.706
Radford	12	–	6	.667	22	–	12	.647
Winthrop	12	–	6	.667	19	–	13	.594
UNC Asheville	10	–	8	.556	15	–	16	.484
Gardner–Webb	10	–	8	.556	20	–	15	.571
Presbyterian	6	–	12	.333	10	–	22	.313
Longwood	5	–	13	.278	11	–	23	.324
Campbell	4	–	14	.222	10	–	22	.313
Liberty	2	–	16	.111	8	–	24	.250
† 2015 Big South tournament winner

The 2014–15 Longwood Lancers men's basketball team represented Longwood University during the 2014–15 NCAA Division I men's basketball season. The team was led by head coach Jayson Gee, in his second season, and played their home games at Willett Hall in Farmville, Virginia as members of the Big South Conference. They finished the season 11–23, 5–13 in Big South play to finish in ninth place. They upset Presbyterian and Charleston Southern in the Big South tournament to advance to the semifinals where they lost to Winthrop.

== Last season ==
The 2013–14 Lancers finished the season 8–24 overall and 3–13 in Big South play, last in the Big South North Division, and second-to-last overall in the conference, only in front of Presbyterian. They lost in the first round of the Big South tournament to Gardner-Webb.

=== Departures ===
Name	Number	Pos.	Height	Weight	Year	Hometown	Notes
Charlie Lockwood	0	C	6'10"	210	Freshman	Inglewood, California	Transferred to North Idaho College
Lucas Woodhouse	2	G	6'1"	155	Sophomore	Greenlawn, New York	Transferred to Stony Brook
Eric Shaw	4	F	6'7"	192	Freshman	Stafford, Virginia	Transferred to Mary Washington
Curtis Rowser III	5	G	6'1"	165	Freshman	Stafford, Virginia	Transferred to Mary Washington
Tristan Carey	12	G	6'4"	185	Senior	Colonial Beach, Virginia	Graduated
David Robinson	13	G	6'4"	190	Senior	Chesterfield, Virginia	Graduated
Karl Ziegler	20	F	6'5"	215	Sophomore	Annandale, Virginia	Transferred to Assumption College
Mark Parker	21	G/F	6'7"	210	Senior	Clayton, North Carolina	Graduated
Jaylani Dublin	22	F	6'6"	225	Junior	Brooklyn, New York	Graduate/Transferred to Iona
Jeff Havenstein	44	F	6'8"	230	Senior	Mount Airy, Maryland	Graduated

=== Incoming transfers ===
Name	Pos.	Height	Weight	Year	Hometown	Previous School	Notes
Khris Lane	F	6'6"	215	Sophomore	Richmond, VA	Drexel	Under NCAA transfer rules, Lane will have to redshirt for the 2014–15 season, and will have three years of remaining eligibility.
Tra'Vaughan White	G	5'10"	190	Senior	Kansas City, KS	Duquesne	White will also have to redshirt for the 2014–15 season, but will have one year of remaining eligibility afterwards.

== Roster ==
On October 29, Victor Dorsey was reported to be suspended for the first three games of the season due to an unspecified violation of team rules. On November 6, it was announced that Jason Pimentel was suspended indefinitely following a violation of team policy, relating to an arrest. On November 13, Quincy Taylor was ruled ineligible and was required by the NCAA to sit out three games, due to participation in an unauthorized basketball program. On February 14, 2015, Pimentel was restored to the team at the direction of athletic director Troy Austin, following his being found guilty and appealing the conviction to the Prince Edward County circuit court.

2014–15 Longwood Lancers men's basketball team
Players
Coaches

Pos.	#	Name	Height	Weight	Year	Previous school	Hometown
G	0	Tra'Vaughn White (redshirt)	5 ft 10 in (1.78 m)	190 lb (86 kg)	Jr	Washington HS/Independence CC/Duquesne	Kansas City, Kansas
G	1	Leron Fisher	5 ft 11 in (1.8 m)	160 lb (73 kg)	Jr	Lake Clifton Eastern HS/Allan Hancock	Baltimore, Maryland
G	2	Bryan Gee (redshirt)	6 ft 0 in (1.83 m)	175 lb (79 kg)	Fr	Cornerstone Christian	Cleveland, Ohio
G	3	Darrion Allen	6 ft 2 in (1.88 m)	165 lb (75 kg)	So	Blanche Ely HS	Pompano Beach, Florida
F	4	Khris Lane (redshirt)	6 ft 6 in (1.98 m)	225 lb (102 kg)	So	Benedictine HS/Drexel	Richmond, Virginia
F	5	Jason Pimentel	6 ft 8 in (2.03 m)	230 lb (104 kg)	Jr	Montverde/Palm Beach	Ocala, Florida
F/C	10	Lotanna Nwogbo (injured) (C)	6 ft 8 in (2.03 m)	255 lb (116 kg)	RS Jr	Mount Vernon Presbyterian/Tulane	Lithonia, Georgia
G	11	Kanayo Obi-Rapu Jr.	6 ft 3 in (1.91 m)	190 lb (86 kg)	Fr	New Garden Friends	Greensboro, North Carolina
F	14	Victor Dorsey	6 ft 9 in (2.06 m)	200 lb (91 kg)	Fr	Springfield HSS	Akron, Ohio
G	15	Isaac Belton	6 ft 4 in (1.93 m)	205 lb (93 kg)	So	Virginia Episcopal/Fork Union MA	Salem, Virginia
G/F	21	Shaquille Johnson	6 ft 5 in (1.96 m)	220 lb (100 kg)	Jr	Milton HS/Northwest Florida	Atlanta, Georgia
G	23	Ryan Badowski	6 ft 3 in (1.91 m)	185 lb (84 kg)	Fr	Brunswick HS	Cleveland, Ohio
F	24	Damarion Geter (C)	6 ft 7 in (2.01 m)	215 lb (98 kg)	So	Dunbar HS	Dayton, Ohio
G	25	Quincy Taylor (C)	6 ft 0 in (1.83 m)	180 lb (82 kg)	RS Sr	Wichita Collegiate/UAB	Wichita, Kansas
G	30	Tyler Akers (C W)	6 ft 4 in (1.93 m)	180 lb (82 kg)	Sr	George Wythe HS	Wytheville, Virginia

Head coach

- Jayson Gee (University of Charleston)

Assistant coach(es)

- Jake Luhn (UMass Boston)
- Samba Johnson (Chaminade)
- Craig Carter (Rutgers)

Legend

- (C) Team captain
- (S) Suspended
- (I) Ineligible
- (W) Walk-on
- Injured
- Current redshirt

Roster
Last update: 22 August 2014

== Schedule ==
Date time, TV	Rank^{#}	Opponent^{#}	Result	Record	High points	High rebounds	High assists	Site (attendance) city, state
Exhibition game
November 8*; 5:00 pm		Hampden–Sydney	W 95–60		22 – Taylor	6 – Nwogbo, Geter	6 – Taylor	Willett Hall (1,784); Farmville, VA
Non-conference regular season
November 14*; 7:00 pm, BSN		Averett; EMU Showcase	W 81–53	1–0	21 – Badowski	4 – Belton, Obi-Rapu	3 – Fisher	Willett Hall (1,034); Farmville, VA
November 19*; 7:00 pm		at James Madison	L 60–82	1–1	20 – Allen	7 – Nwogbo	4 – Fisher	JMU Convocation Center (2,877); Harrisonburg, VA
November 21*; 4:30 pm		vs. UNC Greensboro; EMU Showcase	W 81–79 ^{OT}	2–1	22 – Allen	12 – Nwogbo	6 – Johnson, Geter	EMU Convocation Center (680); Ypsilanti, MI
November 22*; 4:30 pm		vs. Youngstown State; EMU Showcase	L 72–82	2–2	16 – Johnson, Nwogbo	8 – Nwogbo	7 – Taylor	EMU Convocation Center (624); Ypsilanti, MI
November 23*; 2:30 pm		at Eastern Michigan; EMU Showcase	L 48–79	2–3	14 – Nwogbo	8 – Dorsey	4 – Johnson, Taylor	EMU Convocation Center (395); Ypsilanti, MI
November 26*; 7:00 pm		at George Washington	L 66–91	2–4	25 – Nwogbo	13 – Nwogbo	4 – Fisher	Charles E. Smith Center (1,897); Washington, DC
November 29*; 2:00 pm		at Iowa	L 44–77	2–5	16 – Johnson	12 – Nwogbo	6 – Johnson	Carver–Hawkeye Arena (13,819); Iowa City, IA
December 3*; 7:00 pm, BSN		Dartmouth	W 74–73	3–5	34 – Taylor	5 – Johnson	5 – Johnson	Willett Hall (1,524); Farmville, VA
December 6*; 5:00 pm, BSN		UT Martin	L 66–77	3–6	18 – Taylor	6 – Nwogbo	2 – Obi-Rapu	Willett Hall (N/A); Farmville, VA
December 14*; 2:00 pm		at UMBC	L 53–58	3–7	17 – Johnson	7 – Johnson, Nwogbo	3 – Fisher	Retriever Activities Center (631); Baltimore, MD
December 17*; 7:00 pm		at Miami (OH)	L 60–71	3–8	16 – Taylor	9 – Nwogbo	3 – Obi-Rapu	Millett Hall (470); Oxford, OH
December 20*; 2:00 pm, BSN		Penn State Beaver	W 106–74	4–8	22 – Johnson	8 – Geter	3 – Fisher, Geter, Johnson, Taylor	Willett Hall (428); Farmville, VA
December 28*; 2:00 pm		at Ball State	L 64–69	4–9	20 – Taylor	8 – Nwogbo	4 – Fisher, Taylor	John E. Worthen Arena (2,276); Muncie, IN
Conference regular season
December 31; 1:00 pm, BSN		at Winthrop	L 72–82 ^{OT}	4–10 (0–1)	18 – Nwogbo, Johnson	12 – Nwogbo	5 – Nwogbo	Winthrop Coliseum (1,074); Rock Hill, SC
January 3; 5:00 pm, BSN		Radford	W 90–79 ^{2OT}	5–10 (1–1)	26 – Fisher	14 – Nwogbo	7 – Taylor	Willett Hall (1,802); Farmville, VA
January 8; 7:30 pm, BSN		at Coastal Carolina	L 70–76	5–11 (1–2)	23 – Nwogbo	10 – Nwogbo	3 – Johnson, Taylor	HTC Center (1,824); Conway, SC
January 10; 7:00 pm, BSN		at Charleston Southern	L 54–68	5–12 (1–3)	14 – Taylor	6 – Geter, Johnson	3 – Johnson	CSU Field House (783); Charleston, SC
January 14; 7:00 pm, BSN		Presbyterian	L 67–71	5–13 (1–4)	23 – Taylor	9 – Johnson	5 – Fisher	Willett Hall (1,612); Farmville, VA
January 17; 5:00 pm, BSN		Liberty	W 85–71	6–13 (2–4)	31 – Johnson	8 – Johnson	5 – Johnson	Willett Hall (1,761); Farmville, VA
January 19; 7:00 pm, BSN/ESPN3		at High Point	L 67–72	6–14 (2–5)	19 – Taylor	6 – Geter	4 – Geter, Johnson	Millis Center (1,750); High Point, NC
January 22; 7:00 pm, BSN		at Gardner–Webb	L 67–79	6–15 (2–6)	25 – Fisher	8 – Geter	5 – Fisher	Paul Porter Arena (874); Boiling Springs, NC
January 28; 7:00 pm, BSN		UNC Asheville	L 64–74	6–16 (2–7)	25 – Taylor	5 – Badowski, Geter, Johnson	3 – Fisher	Willett Hall (924); Farmville, VA
January 31; 7:00 pm, BSN		at Presbyterian	W 71–67	7–16 (3–7)	26 – Fisher	6 – Johnson	3 – Fisher, Geter	Templeton Center (1,532); Clinton, SC
February 3; 7:00 pm, BSN		Gardner–Webb	L 78–87	7–17 (3–8)	21 – Johnson	5 – Johnson, Badowski	3 – Taylor, Fisher	Willett Hall (1,371); Farmville, VA
February 6; 7:00 pm, BSN		at UNC Asheville	L 56–71	7–18 (3–9)	19 – Johnson, Taylor	5 – Taylor	7 – Fisher	Kimmel Arena (1,153); Asheville, NC
February 11; 7:00 pm, BSN		at Radford	L 75–80	7–19 (3–10)	22 – Johnson	7 – Geter	3 – Johnson, Taylor	Dedmon Center (2,341); Radford, VA
February 14; 5:00 pm, BSN		Charleston Southern	L 64–65	7–20 (3–11)	30 – Taylor	7 – Taylor, Johnson	4 – Taylor	Willett Hall (1,024); Farmville, VA
February 17; 8:00 pm, ASN		at Liberty	W 78–72	8–20 (4–11)	24 – Fisher	10 – Geter	4 – Fisher	Vines Center (844); Lynchburg, VA
February 21; 5:00 pm, BSN		Winthrop	L 59–83	8–21 (4–12)	19 – Taylor	7 – Johnson	3 – Taylor	Willett Hall (1,421); Farmville, VA
February 23; 7:00 pm, BSN		Coastal Carolina	L 59–72	8–22 (4–13)	15 – Fisher, Taylor	8 – Johnson	5 – Fisher	Willett Hall (1,342); Farmville, VA
February 28; 2:00 pm, BSN		Campbell	W 70–65	9–22 (5–13)	25 – Taylor	9 – Pimentel	5 – Johnson	Willett Hall (1,328); Farmville, VA
Big South tournament
March 4 Noon, BSN	(9)	vs. (8) Presbyterian; First round	W 65–61	10–22	25 – Johnson	11 – Johnson	4 – Fisher, Taylor	HTC Center (1,337); Conway, SC
March 6 Noon, ESPN3	(9)	vs. (1) Charleston Southern; Quarterfinals	W 68–60	11–22	22 – Johnson	15 – Johnson	5 – Taylor	HTC Center (1,773); Conway, SC
March 7 Noon, ESPN3	(9)	vs. (5) Winthrop; Semifinals	L 58–71	11–23	23 – Fisher, Taylor	10 – Johnson	4 – Fisher	HTC Center (2,765); Conway, SC
*Non-conference game. ^{#}Rankings from AP Poll. (#) Tournament seedings in parentheses. All times are in Eastern Time.
