= 2013–14 Michigan State Spartans men's basketball team =

American college basketball season

2013–14 Michigan State Spartans men's basketball

Big Ten tournament champions Coaches vs. Cancer Classic Champions

NCAA tournament, Elite Eight
- Conference: Big Ten Conference

Ranking
- Coaches: No. 8
- AP: No. 11
- Record: 29–9 (12–6 Big Ten)
- Head coach: Tom Izzo (19th season)
- Associate head coach: Dwayne Stephens (11th season)
- Assistant coaches: Mike Garland (7th season); Dane Fife (3rd season)
- Home arena: Breslin Center

2013–14 Big Ten Conference men's basketball standings
| | Conf. | | | | Overall |
| Team | W | | L | PCT | W | | L | PCT |
|---|---|---|---|---|---|---|---|---|
| No. 7 Michigan | 15 | – | 3 | .833 | 28 | – | 9 | .757 |
| No. 12 Wisconsin | 12 | – | 6 | .667 | 30 | – | 8 | .789 |
| No. 11 Michigan State† | 12 | – | 6 | .667 | 29 | – | 9 | .763 |
| Nebraska | 11 | – | 7 | .611 | 19 | – | 13 | .594 |
| No. 22 Ohio State | 10 | – | 8 | .556 | 25 | – | 10 | .714 |
| Iowa | 9 | – | 9 | .500 | 20 | – | 13 | .606 |
| Minnesota | 8 | – | 10 | .444 | 25 | – | 13 | .658 |
| Illinois | 7 | – | 11 | .389 | 20 | – | 15 | .571 |
| Indiana | 7 | – | 11 | .389 | 17 | – | 15 | .531 |
| Penn State | 6 | – | 12 | .333 | 16 | – | 18 | .471 |
| Northwestern | 6 | – | 12 | .333 | 14 | – | 19 | .424 |
| Purdue | 5 | – | 13 | .278 | 15 | – | 17 | .469 |
† 2014 Big Ten tournament winner Rankings from AP poll

The 2013–14 Michigan State Spartans men's basketball team represented Michigan State University in the 2013–14 college basketball season. The Spartans, led by 19th-year head coach Tom Izzo, played their home games at the Breslin Center in East Lansing, Michigan as members of the Big Ten Conference. MSU finished the season with a record of 29–9, 12–6 to finish in a tie for second place in Big Ten play. As the No. 3 seed in the Big Ten tournament, the Spartans defeated Northwestern, Wisconsin, and Michigan (avenging to regular season losses to the Wolverines) to win the tournament championship. As a result, they received the conference's automatic bid to the NCAA tournament, MSU's 17th straight trip. As the No. 4 seed in the East region, they defeated Delaware, Harvard, and No. 1-seeded Virginia to reach the Elite Eight where they lost to eventual National Champion, UConn. The loss marked the first time in Tom Izzo's career that a player who played four years for Izzo had failed to reach a Final Four.

== Previous season ==
The Spartans finished the 2012–13 season with an overall record of 27–9, 13–5 to finish in second place in the Big Ten. Michigan State received a No. 3 seed in the NCAA tournament, their 16th straight trip to the Tournament, and advanced to the Sweet Sixteen before losing to Duke.

== Offseason ==
The Spartans lost Derrick Nix (9.9 points and 6.6 rebounds per game) to graduation following the season.

=== 2013 recruiting class ===
Coach Tom Izzo heavily recruited number two overall recruit Jabari Parker for his 2013 class hoping to make it the centerpiece for the recruiting class. Michigan State, however, lost out to Duke on Parker and other top recruits.

College recruiting
| Name | Hometown | School | Height | Weight | Commit date |
|---|---|---|---|---|---|
| Gavin Schilling #37 PF | Henderson, NV | Findlay Prep | 6 ft 9 in (2.06 m) | 205 lb (93 kg) | Mar 28, 2013 |
| Gavin Schilling #37 PF | Recruit ratings: Scout: Rivals: 247Sports: ESPN: | | | | |
| Alvin Ellis III; SF | Chicago, IL | De La Salle Institute | 6 ft 5 in (1.96 m) | 185 lb (84 kg) | Apr 24, 2013 |
| Alvin Ellis III; SF | Recruit ratings: Scout: Rivals: 247Sports: ESPN: | | | | |
Overall recruit ranking:
Note: In many cases, Scout, Rivals, 247Sports, On3, and ESPN may conflict in their listings of height and weight.; In these cases, the average was taken. ESPN grades are on a 100-point scale.; Sources: "Michigan State Commit List for 2013". Rivals.; "Men's Basketball Recruiting". Scout.; "ESPN - Michigan State Spartans Basketball Recruiting 2013". ESPN.; "Scout.com Team Recruiting Rankings". Scout.; "2013 Team Ranking". Rivals.

== Season summary ==
Michigan State began the season looking to continue Tom Izzo's Final Four streak: every player who had played four years for Izzo had made at least one Final Four. For the first time under Izzo, the team selected no captains.

Seniors Adreian Payne (16.4 points and 7.3 rebounds per game) and Keith Appling (11.2 points and 4.5 assists per game), junior Branden Dawson (11.2 points and 8.3 rebounds per game), and sophomore Gary Harris (16.7 points and 4.0 rebounds per game) led the Spartans as they looked to continue Izzo's Final Four streak.

MSU started the preseason ranked No. 2 overall and, after beating No. 1 Kentucky in the Champions Classic, the Spartans moved to the No. 1 spot. The Spartans held the No. 1 spot for three weeks while beating Columbia, Portland, Virginia Tech, and Oklahoma to win the Coaches vs. Cancer Classic. They surrendered the No. 1 ranking with a loss to North Carolina in the ACC-Big Ten Challenge. The Spartans cruised through the remaining non-conference schedule, A win at Texas topped off an 11–1 non-conference record and left the Spartans ready to begin the Big Ten season ranked No. 5 in the country.

The Spartans won their first seven conference games with wins over Penn State, Indiana (twice), Minnesota, Northwestern, Illinois, and No. 3 Ohio State. Without Dawson and Payne due to injuries, MSU lost its first Big Ten game at home to No. 21 Michigan in East Lansing on a College Gameday game. The Spartans also lost to Georgetown in a non-conference game at Madison Square Garden on February 1. Due to injuries to Appling and further injuries to Payne and Dawson, MSU lost five of their last eight conference games to finish in a second-place tie with Wisconsin at 12–6. Michigan State finished the regular season at 23–8 overall and ranked No. 22 in the country.

The Spartans, finally healthy and at full strength, beat Northwestern, No. 12 Wisconsin, and No. 8 Michigan to capture the Big Ten tournament championship. This marked Michigan State's fourth tournament championship, tying them with Ohio State for the conference record. As a result, MSU earned the conference's automatic bid to the NCAA Tournament for the 17th consecutive year.

Michigan State received the No. 4 seed in the East Region. With wins against Delaware and Harvard, they advanced to the Sweet Sixteen for the third straight year and the 12th time 17 years. They defeated No. 1-seeded Virginia in the Sweet Sixteen to advance to the Elite Eight for the first time since 2010. There they fell to No. 7 seed and eventual National Champion, UConn. With the loss, Tom Izzo's Final Four streak ended.

Shortly after the season, Gary Harris declared for the NBA draft.

== Roster ==
2013–14 Michigan State Spartans men's basketball team
Players
Coaches

| Pos. | # | Name | Height | Weight | Year | Previous school | Hometown |
|---|---|---|---|---|---|---|---|
| G | 11 | Keith Appling | 6 ft 2 in (1.88 m) | 190 lb (86 kg) | Sr | Pershing H.S. | Detroit, MI |
| F | 13 | Trevor Bohnhoff (W) | 6 ft 7 in (2.01 m) | 215 lb (98 kg) | So | Nouvel H.S. | Saginaw, MI |
| F | 0 | Russell Byrd | 6 ft 7 in (2.01 m) | 205 lb (93 kg) | RS Jr | Blackhawk Christian | Fort Wayne, IN |
| G | 40 | Dan Chapman (W) | 6 ft 3 in (1.91 m) | 190 lb (86 kg) | Jr | Okemos H.S. | Okemos, MI |
| F | 10 | Matt Costello | 6 ft 9 in (2.06 m) | 245 lb (111 kg) | So | Western H.S. | Bay City, MI |
| G | 22 | Branden Dawson | 6 ft 6 in (1.98 m) | 230 lb (104 kg) | Jr | Lew Wallace H.S. | Gary, IN |
| G | 3 | Alvin Ellis | 6 ft 4 in (1.93 m) | 185 lb (84 kg) | Fr | De La Salle | Chicago, IL |
| F | 2 | Alex Gauna | 6 ft 9 in (2.06 m) | 245 lb (111 kg) | RS Jr | Eaton Rapids H.S. | Eaton Rapids, MI |
| G | 14 | Gary Harris | 6 ft 4 in (1.93 m) | 205 lb (93 kg) | So | Hamilton Southeastern H.S. | Fishers, IN |
| F | 30 | Kenny Kaminski | 6 ft 8 in (2.03 m) | 240 lb (109 kg) | So | Medina H.S. | Medina, OH |
| C | 5 | Adreian Payne | 6 ft 10 in (2.08 m) | 240 lb (109 kg) | Sr | Western H.S. | Dayton, OH |
| C | 34 | Gavin Schilling | 6 ft 9 in (2.06 m) | 245 lb (111 kg) | Fr | Findlay Prep | Chicago, IL |
| G | 20 | Travis Trice | 6 ft 0 in (1.83 m) | 170 lb (77 kg) | Jr | Wayne H.S. | Huber Heights, OH |
| G | 15 | Keenan Wetzel (W) | 6 ft 4 in (1.93 m) | 200 lb (91 kg) | RS Jr | St. Mary Catholic Central H.S. | Monroe, MI |
| G | 41 | Colby Wollenman | 6 ft 7 in (2.01 m) | 225 lb (102 kg) | RS So | Big Horn H.S. | Big Horn, WY |
| G | 45 | Denzel Valentine | 6 ft 5 in (1.96 m) | 220 lb (100 kg) | So | Sexton H.S. | Lansing, MI |

Head coach

- Tom Izzo (Northern Michigan)

Assistant coach(es)

- Dwayne Stephens (Michigan State)
- Dane Fife (Indiana)
- Mike Garland (Northern Michigan)

Legend

- (C) Team captain
- (S) Suspended
- (I) Ineligible
- (W) Walk-on
- Injured
- Current redshirt

Roster
Last update: 2013-08-22

== Schedule and results ==
| Date time, TV | Rank^{#} | Opponent^{#} | Result | Record | High points | High rebounds | High assists | Site (attendance) city, state |
Exhibition
| Oct 29, 2013*; 7:00 pm | No. 2 | Grand Valley State | W 101–52 | | 17 – Appling | 7 – Dawson | 4 – Appling | Breslin Center; East Lansing, MI |
| Nov 4, 2013*; 7:00 pm | No. 2 | Indiana (PA) | W 83–45 | | 21 – Harris | 6 – Costello | 11 – Appling | Breslin Center (14,797); East Lansing, MI |
Regular season
| Nov 8, 2013*; 7:00 pm | No. 2 | McNeese State | W 98–56 | 1–0 | 20 – Harris | 10 – Harris/Payne | 6 – Harris | Breslin Center (14,797); East Lansing, MI |
| Nov 12, 2013*; 6:30 pm, ESPN | No. 2 | vs. No. 1 Kentucky; Champions Classic | W 78–74 | 2–0 | 22 – Appling | 9 – Dawson | 8 – Appling | United Center (22,711); Chicago, IL |
| Nov 15, 2013*; 9:00 pm, BTN | No. 2 | Columbia; Coaches Vs. Cancer Classic | W 62–53 | 3–0 | 26 – Payne | 11 – Payne | 6 – Appling | Breslin Center (14,797); East Lansing, MI |
| Nov 18, 2013*; 8:00 pm, BTN | No. 1 | Portland; Coaches Vs. Cancer Classic | W 82–67 | 4–0 | 25 – Appling | 10 – Dawson | 7 – Appling | Breslin Center (14,797); East Lansing, MI |
| Nov 22, 2013*; 8:30 pm, truTV | No. 1 | vs. Virginia Tech; Coaches Vs. Cancer Classic semifinals | W 96–77 | 5–0 | 29 – Payne | 10 – Dawson/Payne | 7 – Appling | Barclays Center (6,115); Brooklyn, NY |
| Nov 23, 2013*; 9:30 pm, truTV | No. 1 | vs. Oklahoma; Coaches Vs. Cancer Classic championship | W 87–76 | 6–0 | 27 – Appling | 10 – Dawson | 5 – Valentine | Barclays Center (6,098); Brooklyn, NY |
| Nov 29, 2013*; 1:00 pm, BTN | No. 1 | Mount St. Mary's | W 98–65 | 7–0 | 17 – Appling | 10 – Dawson | 7 – Valentine | Breslin Center (14,797); East Lansing, MI |
| Dec 4, 2013*; 9:00 pm, ESPN | No. 1 | North Carolina; ACC–Big Ten Challenge | L 65–79 | 7–1 | 17 – Harris | 8 – Payne | 3 – Appling | Breslin Center (14,797); East Lansing, MI |
| Dec 14, 2013*; 4:00 pm, ESPN2 | No. 5 | vs. Oakland | W 67–63 | 8–1 | 21 – Appling | 13 – Dawson | 4 – Appling/Valentine | The Palace (13,873); Auburn Hills, MI |
| Dec 17, 2013*; 7:00 pm, BTN | No. 5 | North Florida | W 78–48 | 9–1 | 19 – Payne | 8 – Dawson | 4 – Appling/Valentine | Breslin Center (14,797); East Lansing, MI |
| Dec 21, 2013*; 4:00 pm, CBS | No. 5 | at Texas | W 92–78 | 10–1 | 33 – Payne | 11 – Valentine | 5 – Harris | Frank Erwin Center (15,832); Austin, TX |
| Dec 28, 2013*; 4:15 pm, BTN | No. 5 | New Orleans | W 101–48 | 11–1 | 27 – Appling | 13 – Valentine | 8 – Appling | Breslin Center (14,797); East Lansing, MI |
| Dec 31, 2013; 5:00 pm, BTN | No. 5 | at Penn State | W 79–63 | 12–1 (1–0) | 20 – Dawson | 10 – Payne | 6 – Valentine | Bryce Jordan Center (7,397); University Park, PA |
| Jan 4, 2014; 2:00 pm, CBS | No. 5 | at Indiana | W 73–56 | 13–1 (2–0) | 26 – Harris | 6 – Dawson/Valentine | 4 – Trice/Valentine | Assembly Hall (17,472); Bloomington, IN |
| Jan 7, 2014; 9:00 pm, ESPN | No. 5 | No. 3 Ohio State | W 73–68 ^{OT} | 14–1 (3–0) | 20 – Appling | 6 – Appling/Payne/Valentine | 7 – Appling | Breslin Center (14,797); East Lansing, MI |
| Jan 11, 2014; 2:15 pm, BTN | No. 5 | Minnesota | W 87–75 ^{OT} | 15–1 (4–0) | 24 – Appling | 10 – Dawson/Valentine | 4 – Valentine | Breslin Center (14,797); East Lansing, MI |
| Jan 15, 2014; 7:00 pm, BTN | No. 4 | at Northwestern | W 54–40 | 16–1 (5–0) | 14 – Harris | 11 – Dawson | 4 – Appling | Welsh-Ryan Arena (8,117); Evanston, IL |
| Jan 18, 2014; 7:00 pm, BTN | No. 4 | at Illinois | W 78–62 | 17–1 (6–0) | 23 – Harris | 11 – Valentine | 4 – Appling/Harris/Valentine | State Farm Center (16,618); Champaign, IL |
| Jan 21, 2014; 7:00 pm, ESPN | No. 3 | Indiana | W 71–66 | 18–1 (7–0) | 24 – Harris | 9 – Dawson | 6 – Appling | Breslin Center (14,797); East Lansing, MI |
| Jan 25, 2014; 7:00 pm, ESPN | No. 3 | No. 21 Michigan; College GameDay/Rivalry | L 75–80 | 18–2 (7–1) | 27 – Harris | 8 – Costello | 10 – Appling | Breslin Center (14,797); East Lansing, MI |
| Jan 28, 2014; 7:00 pm, ESPN | No. 7 | at No. 15 Iowa | W 71–69 ^{OT} | 19–2 (8–1) | 16 – Appling | 12 – Costello | 4 – Appling/Harris | Carver–Hawkeye Arena (15,400); Iowa City, IA |
| Feb 1, 2014*; 2:00 pm, FS1 | No. 7 | vs. Georgetown | L 60–64 | 19–3 | 20 – Harris | 7 – Valentine | 6 – Appling | Madison Square Garden (12,561); New York City, NY |
| Feb 6, 2014; 9:00 pm, ESPN2 | No. 9 | Penn State | W 82–67 | 20–3 (9–1) | 19 – Kaminski | 11 – Valentine | 7 – Trice | Breslin Center (14,797); East Lansing, MI |
| Feb 9, 2014; 12:00 pm, CBS | No. 9 | at Wisconsin | L 58–60 | 20–4 (9–2) | 24 – Payne | 9 – Payne | 3 – Valentine | Kohl Center (17,249); Madison, WI |
| Feb 13, 2014; 7:00 pm, BTN | No. 9 | Northwestern | W 85–70 | 21–4 (10–2) | 20 – Payne | 14 – Payne | 6 – Trice/Valentine | Breslin Center (14,797); East Lansing, MI |
| Feb 16, 2014; 3:00 pm, BTN | No. 9 | Nebraska | L 51–60 | 21–5 (10–3) | 18 – Harris | 9 – Payne | 4 – Harris | Breslin Center (14,797); East Lansing, MI |
| Feb 20, 2014; 7:00 pm, ESPN | No. 13 | at Purdue | W 94–79 | 22–5 (11–3) | 25 – Harris | 5 – Valentine | 6 – Trice | Mackey Arena (14,088); West Lafayette, IN |
| Feb 23, 2014; 12:00 pm, CBS | No. 13 | at No. 20 Michigan; Rivalry | L 70–79 | 22–6 (11–4) | 21 – Harris | 11 – Payne | 6 – Valentine | Crisler Arena (12,707); Ann Arbor, MI |
| Mar 1, 2014; 2:00 pm, ESPN | No. 18 | Illinois | L 46–53 | 22–7 (11–5) | 19 – Harris | 7 – Dawson/Payne | 4 – Appling/Valentine | Breslin Center (14,797); East Lansing, MI |
| Mar 6, 2014; 9:00 pm, ESPN | No. 22 | No. 24 Iowa | W 86–76 | 23–7 (12–5) | 17 – Trice | 5 – Valentine | 9 – Assists | Breslin Center (14,797); East Lansing, MI |
| Mar 9, 2014; 4:30 pm, CBS | No. 22 | at Ohio State | L 67–69 | 23–8 (12–6) | 23 – Payne | 8 – Payne | 6 – Appling | Value City Arena (18,809); Columbus, OH |
Big Ten tournament
| Mar 14, 2014; 9:00 pm, BTN | (3) No. 22 | vs. (11) Northwestern; Quarterfinals | W 67–51 | 24–8 | 16 – Dawson | 9 – Dawson | 4 – Valentine | Bankers Life Fieldhouse; Indianapolis, IN |
| Mar 15, 2014; 3:00 pm, CBS | (3) No. 22 | vs. (2) No. 12 Wisconsin; Semifinals | W 83–75 | 25–8 | 18 – Payne | 7 – Valentine | 6 – Appling | Bankers Life Fieldhouse; Indianapolis, IN |
| Mar 16, 2014; 3:30 pm, CBS | (3) No. 22 | vs. (1) No. 8 Michigan; Championship; Rivalry | W 69–55 | 26–8 | 18 – Payne | 6 – Payne | 3 – Appling/Valentine | Bankers Life Fieldhouse; Indianapolis, IN |
NCAA tournament
| Mar 20, 2014; 4:40 pm, TNT | (4 E) No. 11 | vs. (13 E) Delaware; Second Round | W 93–78 | 27–8 | 41 – Payne | 8 – Dawson/Payne | 5 – Appling | Spokane Arena (10,862); Spokane, WA |
| Mar 22, 2014; 8:40 pm, TNT | (4 E) No. 11 | vs. (12 E) Harvard; Third Round | W 80–73 | 28–8 | 26 – Dawson | 6 – Dawson | 6 – Valentine | Spokane Arena (11,623); Spokane, WA |
| Mar 28, 2014; 8:57 pm, TBS | (4 E) No. 11 | vs. (1 E) No. 3 Virginia; Sweet Sixteen | W 61–59 | 29–8 | 24 – Dawson | 10 – Dawson | 3 – Harris/Valentine | Madison Square Garden (19,314); New York City, NY |
| Mar 30, 2014; 2:20 pm, CBS | (4 E) No. 11 | vs. (7 E) No. 18 UConn; Elite Eight | L 54–60 | 29–9 | 22 – Harris | 9 – Payne | 3 – Payne | Madison Square Garden (19,499); New York City, NY |
*Non-conference game. ^{#}Rankings from AP Poll, (#) denotes seed within region. (#) Tournament seedings in parentheses. All times are in Eastern Time Source.

== Player statistics ==
Individual player statistics (Final)
| | | | Minutes | | Scoring | | Total FGs | | | 3-point FGs | | | Free-Throws | | | Rebounds | | | | | | | |
| Player | GP | GS | Tot | Avg | Pts | Avg | FG | FGA | Pct | 3FG | 3FA | Pct | FT | FTA | Pct | Off | Def | Tot | Avg | A | Stl | Blk | Tov |
|---|---|---|---|---|---|---|---|---|---|---|---|---|---|---|---|---|---|---|---|---|---|---|---|
| Appling, Keith | 35 | 32 | 1102 | 31.5 | 391 | 11.2 | 132 | 292 | .452 | 34 | 97 | .362 | 93 | 141 | .660 | 13 | 93 | 106 | 3.0 | 156 | 41 | 14 | 74 |
| Bohnhoff, Trevor | 8 | 0 | 13 | 1.6 | 4 | 0.5 | 1 | 3 | .500 | 0 | 0 | | 2 | 4 | .500 | 3 | 1 | 4 | 0.5 | 0 | 0 | 0 | 0 |
| Byrd, Russell | 24 | 0 | 175 | 7.3 | 26 | 1.1 | 9 | 27 | .333 | 6 | 21 | .286 | 2 | 6 | .333 | 6 | 18 | 24 | 1.0 | 3 | 3 | 5 | 6 |
| Chapman, Dan | 14 | 0 | 21 | 1.5 | 5 | 0.4 | 2 | 7 | .286 | 1 | 3 | .333 | 0 | 0 | | 1 | 1 | 2 | 0.1 | 1 | 0 | 0 | 1 |
| Costello, Matt | 34 | 20 | 501 | 14.7 | 137 | 4.0 | 52 | 87 | .598 | 0 | 0 | | 33 | 50 | .660 | 47 | 66 | 113 | 3.3 | 27 | 9 | 43 | 22 |
| Dawson, Branden | 28 | 24 | 792 | 28.3 | 314 | 11.2 | 136 | 222 | .613 | 0 | 1 | .000 | 42 | 64 | .656 | 83 | 150 | 233 | 8.3 | 46 | 35 | 25 | 36 |
| Ellis, Alvin | 36 | | 283 | 7.9 | 67 | 1.9 | 24 | 40 | .480 | 6 | 13 | .462 | 13 | 22 | .591 | 8 | 15 | 23 | 0.6 | 14 | 13 | 3 | 22 |
| Gauana, Alex | 29 | 6 | 206 | 7.1 | 46 | 1.6 | 21 | 38 | .553 | 0 | 1 | .000 | 4 | 13 | .308 | 13 | 24 | 37 | 1.3 | 6 | 2 | 7 | 7 |
| Harris, Gary | 35 | 34 | 1131 | 32.3 | 586 | 16.7 | 195 | 455 | .429 | 81 | 230 | .352 | 115 | 142 | .810 | 37 | 103 | 140 | 4.0 | 94 | 63 | 15 | 60 |
| Kaminski, Kenny | 31 | 3 | 378 | 12.2 | 152 | 1.4 | 53 | 104 | .510 | 38 | 77 | .494 | 8 | 13 | .615 | 20 | 26 | 46 | 1.5 | 11 | 9 | 8 | 7 |
| Payne, Adreian | 31 | 25 | 870 | 28.1 | 509 | 16.4 | 178 | 354 | .503 | 44 | 104 | .423 | 109 | 138 | .790 | 48 | 177 | 225 | 7.3 | 41 | 15 | 28 | 63 |
| Schilling, Gavin | 37 | 1 | 239 | 6.5 | 53 | 1.4 | 21 | 38 | .553 | 0 | 0 | | 11 | 21 | .524 | 28 | 31 | 59 | 1.6 | 9 | 0 | 8 | 20 |
| Trice, Travis | 36 | 8 | 801 | 22.3 | 263 | 7.3 | 87 | 207 | .420 | 53 | 122 | .434 | 36 | 44 | .818 | 8 | 50 | 58 | 1.6 | 84 | 32 | 6 | 37 |
| Valentine, Denzel | 38 | 31 | 1116 | 29.4 | 303 | 8.0 | 108 | 265 | .408 | 43 | 114 | .377 | 44 | 65 | .677 | 47 | 181 | 228 | 6.0 | 144 | 37 | 12 | 69 |
| Wetzel, Keenan | 12 | 0 | 21 | 1.8 | 9 | 0.8 | 4 | 9 | .444 | 1 | 3 | .333 | 0 | 0 | | 3 | 1 | 4 | 0.3 | 1 | 0 | 0 | 0 |
| Wollenman, Colby | 12 | 0 | 25 | 2.1 | 5 | 0.4 | 1 | 2 | .500 | 0 | 0 | | 3 | 5 | .600 | 0 | 2 | 2 | 0.2 | 0 | 0 | 0 | 0 |
| Total | 38 | | 7674 | | 2870 | 75.5 | 1024 | 2159 | .474 | 307 | 783 | .392 | 515 | 728 | .707 | 409 | 991 | 1400 | 36.8 | 637 | 259 | 174 | 440 |
| Opponents | 38 | | 7674 | | 2491 | 65.6 | 817 | 2058 | .397 | 252 | 760 | .332 | 605 | 829 | .730 | 375 | 833 | 1208 | 31.8 | 405 | 214 | 110 | 449 |

Legend
| GP | Games played | GS | Games started | Avg | Average per game |
| FG | Field-goals made | FGA | Field-goal attempts | Off | Offensive rebounds |
| Def | Defensive rebounds | A | Assists | Tov | Turnovers |
| Blk | Blocks | Stl | Steals |

== Rankings ==
Ranking movements Legend: ██ Increase in ranking ██ Decrease in ranking ( ) = First-place votes
| | Week | | | | | | | | | | | | | | | | | | | | |
| Poll | Pre | 1 | 2 | 3 | 4 | 5 | 6 | 7 | 8 | 9 | 10 | 11 | 12 | 13 | 14 | 15 | 16 | 17 | 18 | 19 | Final |
|---|---|---|---|---|---|---|---|---|---|---|---|---|---|---|---|---|---|---|---|---|---|
| AP | 2 (22) | 2 (22) | 1 (51) | 1 (56) | 1 (63) | 5 | 5 | 5 | 5 | 5 | 4 | 3 | 7 | 9 | 9 | 13 | 18 | 22 | 22 | 11 | Not released |
| Coaches | 2 (3) | 2 (2) | 1 (22) | 1 (30) | 1 (31) | 5 | 5 | 5 | 4 | 4 | 4 (1) | 3 | 6 | 8 | 10 | 14 | 18 | 22 | 22 | 13 | 8 |

*AP does not release post-NCAA tournament rankings

== Awards and honors ==
- Keith Appling - All Big Ten Honorable Mention, NABC All-District Second Team
- Branden Dawson - Most Outstanding Player, Big Ten tournament
- Gary Harris - All Big Ten First Team, NABC All-District First Team, USBWA All-District Team, Big Ten All-Tournament Team
- Adreian Payne - All-Big Ten First Team, NABC All-District Second Team, USBWA All-District Team, Big Ten All-Tournament Team
- Denzel Valentine - All Big Ten Honorable Mention
