= 2013–14 Yale Bulldogs men's basketball team =

American college basketball season

2013–14 Yale Bulldogs men's basketball

CIT Championship vs. Murray State, L 57–65
- Conference: Ivy League
- Record: 19–14 (9–5 Ivy)
- Head coach: James Jones (15th season)
- Assistant coaches: Matt Kingsley; Jamie Snyder-Fair; Justin Simon
- Home arena: John J. Lee Amphitheater

2013–14 Ivy League men's basketball standings
	Conf.				Overall
Team	W		L	PCT	W		L	PCT
x-Harvard	13	–	1	.929	27	–	5	.844
Yale	9	–	5	.643	19	–	14	.576
Princeton	8	–	6	.571	21	–	9	.700
Columbia	8	–	6	.571	21	–	13	.618
Brown	7	–	7	.500	15	–	14	.517
Dartmouth	5	–	9	.357	12	–	16	.429
Penn	5	–	9	.357	8	–	20	.286
Cornell	1	–	13	.071	2	–	26	.071
Rankings from AP Poll x-Ivy League champion

The 2013–14 Yale Bulldogs men's basketball team represented Yale University during the 2013–14 NCAA Division I men's basketball season. The Bulldogs, led by 15th year head coach James Jones, played their home games at John J. Lee Amphitheater of the Payne Whitney Gymnasium and were members of the Ivy League.

They finished the season 19–14, 9–5 in Ivy League play to finish in second place. They were invited to the CollegeInsider.com Tournament where they defeated Quinnipiac, Holy Cross, Columbia and VMI to advance to the CIT championship game where they lost to Murray State.

== Roster ==
Number	Name	Position	Height	Weight	Year	Hometown
1	Anthony Dallier	Guard	6–6	190	Freshman	Wexford, Pennsylvania
3	J.T. Flowers	Guard	6–6	190	Freshman	Portland, Oregon
4	Jack Montague	Guard	6–0	170	Sophomore	Brentwood, Tennessee
10	Khaliq Bedart Ghani	Guard	6–5	205	Sophomore	Inglewood, California
11	Jesse Pritchard	Guard	6–5	210	Senior	Ames, Iowa
12	Armani Cotton	Guard	6–7	215	Junior	New York City, New York
20	Javier Duren	Guard	6–4	185	Junior	St. Louis, Missouri
21	Nick Victor	Guard	6–5	205	Sophomore	Dallas, Texas
22	Justin Sears	Forward	6–8	205	Sophomore	Plainfield, New Jersey
23	Isaiah Salafia	Guard	6–3	185	Senior	Cromwell, Connecticut
25	AJ Edwards	Guard	6–5	190	Freshman	Seattle, Washington
32	Greg Kelley	Forward	6–8	215	Junior	Newton, Massachusetts
34	Will Childs-Klein	Center	6–11	225	Junior	St. Louis, Missouri
35	Brandon Sherrod	Forward	6–6	240	Junior	Bridgeport, Connecticut
42	Matt Townsend	Forward	6–7	240	Junior	Chappaqua, New York
44	Sam Downey	Forward	6–9	230	Freshman	Lake Forest, Illinois
50	Jeremiah Kreisberg	Center/Forward	6–10	240	Senior	Berkeley, California

== Schedule ==
Date time, TV	Opponent	Result	Record	Site (attendance) city, state
Regular season
11/09/2013*; 5:30 pm	at Central Connecticut; Connecticut 6 Classic	W 93–77	1–0	Webster Bank Arena (N/A); Bridgeport, Connecticut
11/11/2013*; 3:00 pm, SNY	at No. 19 UConn	L 62–80	1–1	XL Center (8,848); Hartford, Connecticut
11/14/2013*; 7:30 pm, ESPN3	at Rutgers	L 71–72	1–2	The RAC (4,487); Piscataway, New Jersey
11/19/2013*; 7:00 pm	Sacred Heart	W 80–65	2–2	John J. Lee Amphitheater (752); New Haven, Connecticut
11/23/2013*; 12:00 pm	at Mercer	L 54–81	2–3	Hawkins Arena (3,500); Macon, Georgia
11/26/2013*; 7:00 pm	at Lafayette	W 79–76	3–3	Kirby Sports Center (1,154); Easton, Pennsylvania
11/30/2013*; 4:00 pm	at Hartford	W 54–49	4–3	Chase Arena at Reich Family Pavilion (1,318); West Hartford, Connecticut
12/04/2013*; 7:30 pm	Bryant	L 64–72	4–4	John J. Lee Amphitheater (718); New Haven, Connecticut
12/07/2013*; 4:30 pm	New Hampshire	W 71–61	5–4	John J. Lee Amphitheater (721); New Haven, Connecticut
12/17/2013*; 7:00 pm, FS1	at Providence	L 74–76	5–5	Dunkin' Donuts Center (3,281); Providence, Rhode Island
12/20/2013*; 7:00 pm	at Albany	L 62–70	5–6	SEFCU Arena (2,108); Albany, New York
01/04/2014*; 5:30 pm, NBCSN	at Saint Louis	L 55–75	5–7	Chaifetz Arena (8,659); St. Louis, Missouri
01/08/2014*; 7:30 pm	Vermont	L 59–67	5–8	John J. Lee Amphitheater (652); New Haven, Connecticut
01/11/2014*; 2:00 pm	Baruch	W 88–49	6–8	John J. Lee Amphitheater (648); New Haven, Connecticut
01/18/2014; 2:00 pm	Brown	W 74–67	7–8 (1–0)	John J. Lee Amphitheater (N/A); New Haven, Connecticut
01/25/2014; 7:00 pm	at Brown	L 56–73	7–9 (1–1)	Pizzitola Sports Center (1,868); Providence, Rhode Island
01/31/2014; 7:00 pm	Columbia	W 69–59	8–9 (2–1)	John J. Lee Amphitheater (1,061); New Haven, Connecticut
02/01/2014; 7:00 pm	Cornell	W 61–57	9–9 (3–1)	John J. Lee Amphitheater (1,027); New Haven, Connecticut
02/07/2014; 7:00 pm	at Dartmouth	W 67–54	10–9 (4–1)	Leede Arena (722); Hanover, New Hampshire
02/08/2014; 7:00 pm	at Harvard	W 74–67	11–9 (5–1)	Lavietes Pavilion (2,195); Cambridge, Massachusetts
02/14/2014; 7:00 pm	Penn	W 69–54	12–9 (6–1)	John J. Lee Amphitheater (1,128); New Haven, Connecticut
02/15/2014; 7:00 pm	Princeton	W 66–65 ^{OT}	13–9 (7–1)	John J. Lee Amphitheater (1,644); New Haven, Connecticut
02/21/2014; 7:00 pm	at Cornell	W 82–65	14–9 (8–1)	Newman Arena (1,054); Ithaca, New York
02/23/2014; 1:30 pm, NBCSN	at Columbia	L 46–62	14–10 (8–2)	Levien Gymnasium (2,160); New York City
02/28/2014; 7:00 pm	at Princeton	L 46–57	14–11 (8–3)	Jadwin Gymnasium (2,730); Princeton, New Jersey
03/01/2014; 7:00 pm	at Penn	W 70–63	15–11 (9–3)	Palestra (4,526); Philadelphia
03/07/2014; 7:30 pm, NBCSN	Harvard	L 58–70	15–12 (9–4)	John J. Lee Amphitheater (2,532); New Haven, Connecticut
03/08/2014; 7:00 pm	Dartmouth	L 61–69	15–13 (9–5)	John J. Lee Amphitheater (1,134); New Haven, Connecticut
CIT
03/19/2014*; 7:00 pm	Quinnipiac; First round	W 69–68	16–13	John J. Lee Amphitheater (922); New Haven, Connecticut
03/22/2014*; 7:00 pm	at Holy Cross; Second round	W 71–66	17–13	Hart Center (1,236); Worcester, Massachusetts
03/26/2014*; 7:00 pm	at Columbia; Quarterfinals	W 72–69	18–13	Levien Gymnasium (2,394); New York City, New York
04/01/2014*; 7:00 pm, CBSSN	at VMI; Semifinals	W 75–62	19–13	Cameron Hall (4,784); Lexington, Virginia
04/03/2014*; 7:00 pm, CBSSN	at Murray State; Championship	L 57–65	19–14	CFSB Center (4,467); Murray, Kentucky
*Non-conference game. ^{#}Rankings from AP Poll. (#) Tournament seedings in parentheses. All times are in Eastern Time.
