= 2013–14 Brown Bears men's basketball team =

American college basketball season

2013–14 Brown Bears men's basketball

CIT, First round
- Conference: Ivy League
- Record: 15–14 (7–7 Ivy)
- Head coach: Mike Martin (2nd season)
- Assistant coaches: T. J. Sorrentine; Dwayne Pina; Paul Halas
- Home arena: Pizzitola Sports Center

2013–14 Ivy League men's basketball standings
	Conf.				Overall
Team	W		L	PCT	W		L	PCT
x-Harvard	13	–	1	.929	27	–	5	.844
Yale	9	–	5	.643	19	–	14	.576
Princeton	8	–	6	.571	21	–	9	.700
Columbia	8	–	6	.571	21	–	13	.618
Brown	7	–	7	.500	15	–	14	.517
Dartmouth	5	–	9	.357	12	–	16	.429
Penn	5	–	9	.357	8	–	20	.286
Cornell	1	–	13	.071	2	–	26	.071
Rankings from AP Poll x-Ivy League champion

The 2013–14 Brown Bears men's basketball team represented Brown University during the 2013–14 NCAA Division I men's basketball season. The Bears, led by second year head coach Mike Martin, played their home games at the Pizzitola Sports Center and were members of the Ivy League.

They finished the season 15–14, 7–7 in Ivy League play to finish in fifth place. They were invited to the CollegeInsider.com Tournament (CIT) where they lost in the first round to Holy Cross.

== Roster ==
Number	Name	Position	Height	Weight	Year	Hometown
1	Longji Yiljep	Guard	6–5	185	Junior	Sanaru-Zaria, Nigeria
2	Leland King	Forward	6–7	215	Freshman	Inglewood, California
3	Steven Spieth	Guard	6–6	210	Freshman	Dallas, Texas
10	Tavon Blackmon	Guard	6–0	180	Freshman	Upper Marlboro, Maryland
11	Joe Sharkey	Guard	6–2	190	Junior	Norwood, Massachusetts
12	Norman Hobbie	Guard	6–4	185	Freshman	Spring Lake, New Jersey
13	Aram Martin	Forward	6–10	190	Freshman	San Antonio, Texas
14	Matty Madigan	Guard	6–4	190	Freshman	Winston-Salem, North Carolina
21	Cedric Kuakumensah	Forward	6–8	235	Sophomore	Worcester, Massachusetts
22	Sean McGonagill	Guard	6–1	180	Senior	Brookfield, Illinois
42	Dockery Walker	Forward	6–7	215	Junior	Magnolia, Delaware
45	Rafael Maia	Center	6–9	235	Junior	São Paulo, Brazil
50	Jon Schmidt	Forward	6–7	210	Junior	Baltimore, Maryland

== Schedule ==
Date time, TV	Opponent	Result	Record	Site (attendance) city, state
Regular season
11/10/2013*; 3:30 pm	Binghamton	W 74–57	1–0	Pizzitola Sports Center (1,050); Providence, RI
11/13/2013*; 7:00 pm, FSN	at Providence	L 69–73	1–1	Dunkin' Donuts Center (6,891); Providence, RI
11/16/2013*; 2:00 pm	at Sacred Heart	W 85–73	2–1	William H. Pitt Center (577); Fairfield, CT
11/19/2013*; 7:00 pm	at UMass Lowell	W 87–76	3–1	Costello Athletic Center (852); Lowell, MA
11/22/2013*; 7:00 pm	at Longwood	W 81–69	4–1	Willett Hall (1,522); Farmville, VA
11/27/2013*; 4:00 pm	at Bryant	L 67–70	4–2	Chace Athletic Center (939); Smithfield, RI
11/30/2013*; 2:00 pm	Central Connecticut	W 72–61	5–2	Pizzitola Sports Center (554); Providence, RI
12/07/2013*; 1:00 pm, CSNMA+	at American	W 72–67	6–2	Bender Arena (1,728); Washington, D.C.
12/10/2013*; 7:00 pm	Albany	L 68–74	6–3	Pizzitola Sports Center (585); Providence, RI
12/22/2013*; 2:00 pm	at Northwestern	L 52–58	6–4	Welsh-Ryan Arena (6,591); Evanston, IL
12/29/2013*; 2:00 pm, TWCS	Niagara	L 65–68	6–5	Pizzitola Sports Center (1,411); Providence, RI
01/02/2014*; 7:00 pm	Rhode Island	L 66–75	6–6	Pizzitola Sports Center (1,229); Providence, RI
01/07/2014*; 7:00 pm	New Hampshire	W 72–68	7–6	Pizzitola Sports Center (490); Providence, RI
01/11/2014*; 1:00 pm	Daniel Webster	W 91–50	8–6	Pizzitola Sports Center (493); Providence, RI
01/18/2014; 2:00 pm	at Yale	L 67–74	8–7 (0–1)	Payne Whitney Gymnasium (N/A); New Haven, CT
01/25/2014; 7:00 pm	Yale	W 73–56	9–7 (1–1)	Pizzitola Sports Center (1,868); Providence, RI
01/31/2014; 7:00 pm	Cornell	W 78–66	10–7 (2–1)	Pizzitola Sports Center (1,216); Providence, RI
02/01/2014; 6:00 pm	Columbia	W 64–56	11–7 (3–1)	Pizzitola Sports Center (1,339); Providence, RI
02/07/2014; 7:00 pm	at Harvard	L 45–52	11–8 (3–2)	Lavietes Pavilion (2,028); Cambridge, MA
02/08/2014; 7:00 pm	at Dartmouth	W 75–62	12–8 (4–2)	Leede Arena (836); Hanover, NH
02/14/2014; 7:00 pm	Princeton	L 65–69	12–9 (4–3)	Pizzitola Sports Center (906); Providence, RI
02/15/2014; 6:00 pm	Penn	W 62–55	13–9 (5–3)	Pizzitola Sports Center (785); Providence, RI
02/21/2014; 7:00 pm	at Columbia	L 68–70	13–10 (5–4)	Levien Gymnasium (1,807); New York City, NY
02/22/2014; 7:00 pm, NBCSN	at Cornell	W 81–75	14–10 (6–4)	Newman Arena (1,144); Ithaca, NY
02/28/2014; 7:30 pm, NBCSN	at Penn	W 76–67	15–10 (7–4)	Palestra (3,146); Philadelphia, PA
03/01/2014; 7:00 pm	at Princeton	L 64–69	15–11 (7–5)	Jadwin Gymnasium (N/A); Princeton, NJ
03/07/2014; 7:00 pm	Dartmouth	L 68–75	15–12 (7–6)	Pizzitola Sports Center (912); Providence, RI
03/08/2014; 7:00 pm	Harvard	L 93–98 ^{OT}	15–13 (7–7)	Pizzitola Sports Center (2,226); Providence, RI
CIT
03/17/2013*; 7:00 pm	Holy Cross; First round	L 65–68	15–14	Pizzitola Sports Center (924); Providence, RI
*Non-conference game. ^{#}Rankings from AP Poll. (#) Tournament seedings in parentheses. All times are in Eastern Time.
