= 2013–14 Columbia Lions men's basketball team =

American college basketball season

2013–14 Columbia Lions men's basketball

CIT Quarterfinals vs. Yale, L 69–72
- Conference: Ivy League
- Record: 21–13 (8–6 Ivy)
- Head coach: Kyle Smith (4th season)
- Assistant coaches: Carlin Hartman; Todd Golden; Kevin Hovde
- Home arena: Levien Gymnasium

2013–14 Ivy League men's basketball standings
	Conf.				Overall
Team	W		L	PCT	W		L	PCT
x-Harvard	13	–	1	.929	27	–	5	.844
Yale	9	–	5	.643	19	–	14	.576
Princeton	8	–	6	.571	21	–	9	.700
Columbia	8	–	6	.571	21	–	13	.618
Brown	7	–	7	.500	15	–	14	.517
Dartmouth	5	–	9	.357	12	–	16	.429
Penn	5	–	9	.357	8	–	20	.286
Cornell	1	–	13	.071	2	–	26	.071
Rankings from AP Poll x-Ivy League champion

The 2013–14 Columbia Lions men's basketball team represented Columbia University during the 2013–14 NCAA Division I men's basketball season. The Lions, led by fourth year head coach Kyle Smith, played their home games at Levien Gymnasium and were members of the Ivy League.

They finished the season 21–13, 8–6 in Ivy League play to finish in a tie for third place. They were invited to the CollegeInsider.com Tournament where they defeated Valparaiso and Eastern Michigan to advance to the quarterfinals where they lost to fellow Ivy League member Yale.

== Roster ==
Number	Name	Position	Height	Weight	Year	Hometown
1	Jeff Coby	Forward	6–8	220	Freshman	Pembroke Pines, Florida
2	Isaac Cohen	Guard	6–4	210	Sophomore	Orlando, Florida
3	Grant Mullins	Guard	6–3	175	Sophomore	Burlington, Canada
4	Kendall Jackson	Guard	5–8	160	Freshman	Union City, California
5	Steve Frankoski	Guard	6–2	175	Junior	Florham Park, New Jersey
11	Zach En'Wezoh	Forward	6–8	220	Sophomore	Kennewick, Washington
12	Maodo Lo	Guard	6–3	180	Sophomore	Berlin, Germany
13	Alex Rosenberg	Forward	6–7	215	Junior	Short Hills, New Jersey
15	Luke Petrasek	Forward	6–10	205	Freshman	East Northport, New York
20	Paddy Quinn	Guard	6–1	175	Sophomore	Ramsey, New Jersey
21	Noah Springwater	Guard	6–3	175	Junior	San Francisco, California
22	Meiko Lyles	Guard	6–3	190	Junior	Nashville, Tennessee
23	Cory Osetkowski	Center	6–11	258	Junior	Rancho Santa Fe, California
24	Van Green	Guard	6–3	185	Senior	Birmingham, Alabama
32	Chris McComber	Forward	6–8	225	Freshman	Nepean, Canada
52	Conor Voss	Center	7–1	245	Freshman	St. Cloud, Minnesota

== Schedule ==
Date time, TV	Opponent	Result	Record	Site (attendance) city, state
Regular season
11/09/2013*; 7:00 pm	UMES	W 73–54	1–0	Levien Gymnasium (1,274); New York City, NY
11/12/2013*; 7:00 pm	Manhattan	L 70–71	1–1	Levien Gymnasium (1,277); New York City, NY
11/15/2013*; 9:00 pm, BTN	at No. 2 Michigan State; Coaches Vs. Cancer Classic	L 53–62	1–2	Breslin Center (14,797); East Lansing, MI
11/21/2013*; 5:00 pm	vs. North Texas; Coaches Vs. Cancer Classic	W 70–66	2–2	Chiles Center (1,159); Portland, OR
11/22/2013*; 7:30 pm	at Portland; Coaches Vs. Cancer Classic	L 52–69	2–3	Chiles Center (1,444); Portland, OR
11/23/2013*; 7:30 pm	vs. Idaho; Coaches Vs. Cancer Classic	W 65–60	3–3	Chiles Center (1,668); Portland, OR
11/26/2013*; 7:00 pm	American	W 61–47	4–3	Levien Gymnasium (1,022); New York City, NY
12/01/2013*; 2:00 pm	at Elon	L 65–68 ^{OT}	4–4	Alumni Gym (726); Elon, NC
12/04/2013*; 7:00 pm	Army	W 81–64	5–4	Levien Gymnasium (717); New York City, NY
12/07/2013*; 7:00 pm	at Bucknell	L 52–57	5–5	Sojka Pavilion (2,867); Lewisburg, PA
12/09/2013*; 7:00 pm	UMass Lowell	W 78–39	6–5	Levien Gymnasium (542); New York City, NY
12/21/2013*; 4:00 pm	Fairleigh Dickinson	W 82–59	7–5	Levien Gymnasium (626); New York City, NY
12/28/2013*; 2:30 pm, FS1	vs. St. John's; Brooklyn Hoops Winter Festival	L 59–65	7–6	Barclays Center (7,203); Brooklyn, NY
12/30/2013*; 7:00 pm	at Colgate	W 76–70 ^{2OT}	8–6	Cotterell Court (734); Hamilton, NY
01/04/2014*; 7:00 pm	St. Francis Brooklyn	W 81–61	9–6	Levien Gymnasium (931); New York City, NY
01/08/2014*; 7:00 pm	Stony Brook	W 68–63	10–6	Levien Gymnasium (605); New York City, NY
01/11/2014*; 4:00 pm	Central Pennsylvania	W 104–78	11–6	Levien Gymnasium (581); New York City, NY
01/18/2014; 7:00 pm	Cornell	W 71–61	12–6 (1–0)	Levien Gymnasium (2,445); New York City, NY
01/25/2014; 12:00 pm	at Cornell	W 74–58	13–6 (2–0)	Newman Arena (3,470); Ithaca, NY
01/31/2014; 7:00 pm	at Yale	L 59–69	13–7 (2–1)	John J. Lee Amphitheater (1,061); New Haven, CT
02/01/2014; 6:00 pm	at Brown	L 56–64	13–8 (2–2)	Pizzitola Sports Center (1,339); Providence, RI
02/07/2014; 7:00 pm	at Princeton	W 53–52	14–8 (3–2)	Jadwin Gymnasium (1,864); Princeton, NJ
02/08/2014; 7:00 pm	at Penn	L 60–68	14–9 (3–3)	Palestra (3,128); Philadelphia, PA
02/14/2014; 7:00 pm	Harvard	L 84–88 ^{2OT}	14–10 (3–4)	Levien Gymnasium (2,474); New York City, NY
02/15/2014; 7:00 pm	Dartmouth	W 69–59	15–10 (4–4)	Levien Gymnasium (1,916); New York City, NY
02/21/2014; 6:00 pm	Brown	W 70–68	16–10 (5–4)	Levien Gymnasium (1,807); New York City, NY
02/23/2014; 1:30 pm, NBCSN	Yale	W 62–46	17–10 (6–4)	Levien Gymnasium (2,160); New York City, NY
02/28/2014; 7:00 pm	at Dartmouth	W 84–72	18–10 (7–4)	Leede Arena (680); Hanover, NH
03/01/2014; 7:00 pm	at Harvard	L 47–80	18–11 (7–5)	Lavietes Pavilion (2,195); Cambridge, MA
03/07/2014; 7:00 pm	Penn	W 74–55	19–11 (8–5)	Levien Gymnasium (2,378); New York City, NY
03/08/2014; 7:00 pm	Princeton	L 64–74	19–12 (8–6)	Levien Gymnasium (2,452); New York City, NY
CIT
03/18/2014*; 8:05 pm	at Valparaiso; First round	W 58–56	20–12	Athletics–Recreation Center (1,633); Valparaiso, IN
03/22/2014*; 7:00 pm	Eastern Michigan; Second round	W 69–56	21–12	Levien Gymnasium (2,019); New York City, NY
03/26/2014*; 7:00 pm	Yale; Quarterfinals	L 69–72	21–13	Levien Gymnasium (2,394); New York City, NY
*Non-conference game. ^{#}Rankings from AP Poll. (#) Tournament seedings in parentheses. All times are in Eastern Time.
