= 2013–14 Harvard Crimson men's basketball team =

American college basketball season

2013–14 Harvard Crimson men's basketball

Great Alaska Shootout Champions Ivy League regular season champions

NCAA tournament, Round of 32
- Conference: Ivy League
- Record: 27–5 (13–1 Ivy)
- Head coach: Tommy Amaker (7th season)
- Assistant coaches: Brian DeStefano; Adam Cohen; Christian Webster
- Captains: Kyle Casey; Brandyn Curry
- Home arena: Lavietes Pavilion

2013–14 Ivy League men's basketball standings
	Conf.				Overall
Team	W		L	PCT	W		L	PCT
x-Harvard	13	–	1	.929	27	–	5	.844
Yale	9	–	5	.643	19	–	14	.576
Princeton	8	–	6	.571	21	–	9	.700
Columbia	8	–	6	.571	21	–	13	.618
Brown	7	–	7	.500	15	–	14	.517
Dartmouth	5	–	9	.357	12	–	16	.429
Penn	5	–	9	.357	8	–	20	.286
Cornell	1	–	13	.071	2	–	26	.071
Rankings from AP Poll x-Ivy League champion

The 2013–14 Harvard Crimson men's basketball team represented Harvard University during the 2013–14 NCAA Division I men's basketball season. The Crimson, led by seventh year head coach Tommy Amaker, played their home games at Lavietes Pavilion and were members of the Ivy League. They finished the season 27–5, 13–1 in Ivy League play to win the Ivy League championship and earn the conference's automatic bid to the NCAA tournament. In the NCAA Tournament, as a 12-seed, the Crimson upset 5-seed Cincinnati in the first round before losing in the second round to 4-seed Michigan State.

== Preseason ==
On September 27, USA Today's Scott Gleeson named Harvard the 31st best team in the country and projected the team to earn a number 8 seed in the 2014 NCAA Division I men's basketball tournament. When the preseason Coaches' Poll was released on October 17, three-time Ivy League defending champion Harvard received 28 points (the 32nd highest point total). When the preseason Associated Press poll was released, Harvard had 46 points (the 31st highest total). Sports Illustrated listed Harvard 20th in its College Basketball edition. Its support was largely based upon the return of 2013 Ivy Rookie of the Year Siyani Chambers and the 2013 Ivy League scoring champion Wesley Saunders as well as the return of Kyle Casey and Brandyn Curry, who had redshirtted the previous season due to the 2012 Harvard cheating scandal. Casey and Curry had been 2011–12 All-Ivy League first and second team selections, respectively.

Harvard was the unanimous selection of the 17-member Ivy League media poll selection committee when it was released on October 23, 2013. Harvard was also the preseason selection of Athlon Sports, Blue Ribbon College Basketball Yearbook, Lindy's Sports and NBCSports.com, but Sporting News selected them second to Princeton. Saunders was selected as the preseason Ivy League player of the year according to Athlon Sports, Blue Ribbon College Basketball Yearbook, Lindy's Sports, NBCSports.com and Sporting News and was a CollegeInsider.Com Lou Henson Preseason Mid-Major All-America Team selection. Both Curry and Chambers were preseason Bob Cousy Award watchlist selections. The team selected Casey and Curry to be its co-captains.

== Recruits ==
=== Class of 2013 ===
Zena Edosomwan was a 4-star recruit and among the top 100 players in the class of 2012 according to multiple recruiting services. Harvard's recruitment of him has become controversial because he had substandard academic qualifications for Harvard. He had to take the SAT's multiple times and reclassify into the class of 2013 while pursuing a post-graduate year at Northfield Mount Hermon. Edosomwan declined basketball scholarships from UCLA, USC, California, Texas, Wake Forest, Arizona, Arizona State, Colorado, Gonzaga, Notre Dame, San Francisco, Texas, Vanderbilt, and Washington to attend Harvard. He is the first player rated among the top 100 by Scout.com to ever commit to Harvard.

College recruiting
Name	Hometown	School	Height	Weight	Commit date
Zena Edosomwan; C/PF	North Hollywood, CA	Northfield Mount Hermon School	6 ft 8.5 in (2.04 m)	230 lb (100 kg)	Nov 3, 2012
Zena Edosomwan; C/PF	Recruit ratings: Scout: Rivals: (79)				
Hunter Myers; SF/PF	Minden, NV	Douglas High School (NV)	6 ft 7 in (2.01 m)	217.5 lb (98.7 kg)	Oct 10, 2012
Hunter Myers; SF/PF	Recruit ratings: Scout: Rivals: (77)				
Matt Fraschilla; PG	Dallas, TX	Highland Park High School	5 ft 9 in (1.75 m)	N/A	Dec 4, 2012
Matt Fraschilla; PG	Recruit ratings: No ratings found				
Overall recruit ranking:
Note: In many cases, Scout, Rivals, 247Sports, On3, and ESPN may conflict in their listings of height and weight.; In these cases, the average was taken. ESPN grades are on a 100-point scale.; Sources: "Harvard 2013 Basketball Commitments". Rivals.; "2013 Harvard Basketball Commits". Scout.; "ESPN Recruiting Nation Basketball". ESPN.; "Scout.com Team Recruiting Rankings". Scout.; "2013 Team Ranking". Rivals.

=== Class of 2014 ===
On September 29, 2013 4-star recruit Chris Egi and 3-star recruit Andre Chatfield both made verbal commitments to Harvard. Egi is the second top 100 recruit in two years for Harvard.

College recruiting
Name	Hometown	School	Height	Weight	Commit date
Chris Egi; C/PF	Montverde, FL	Montverde Academy (FL)	6 ft 9 in (2.06 m)	215 lb (98 kg)	Sep 29, 2013
Chris Egi; C/PF	Recruit ratings: Scout: Rivals: (80)				
Andre Chatfield; SG	Norcross, GA	Norcross High School (GA)	6 ft 5 in (1.96 m)	175 lb (79 kg)	Sep 29, 2013
Andre Chatfield; SG	Recruit ratings: Scout: Rivals: (76)				
Overall recruit ranking:
Note: In many cases, Scout, Rivals, 247Sports, On3, and ESPN may conflict in their listings of height and weight.; In these cases, the average was taken. ESPN grades are on a 100-point scale.; Sources: "Harvard 2014 Basketball Commitments". Rivals.; "2014 Harvard Basketball Commits". Scout.; "ESPN Recruiting Nation Basketball". ESPN.; "Scout.com Team Recruiting Rankings". Scout.; "2014 Team Ranking". Rivals.

== Roster ==
2013–14 Harvard Crimson men's basketball team
Players
Coaches

Pos.	#	Name	Height	Weight	Year	Hometown
G	0	Laurent Rivard	6 ft 5 in (1.96 m)	215 lb (98 kg)	Sr	Saint-Bruno-de-Montarville, Quebec
G	1	Siyani Chambers	6 ft 0 in (1.83 m)	170 lb (77 kg)	So	Golden Valley, Minnesota
G	2	Alex Nesbitt	6 ft 1 in (1.85 m)	175 lb (79 kg)	Jr	Chicago, Illinois
G	3	Matt Brown	6 ft 3 in (1.91 m)	205 lb (93 kg)	Jr	Barrington, Rhode Island
F	4	Zena Edosomwan	6 ft 9 in (2.06 m)	245 lb (111 kg)	Fr	Los Angeles, California
F	5	Hunter Myers	6 ft 7 in (2.01 m)	225 lb (102 kg)	Fr	Minden, Nevada
G	10	Brandyn Curry	6 ft 1 in (1.85 m)	195 lb (88 kg)	Sr	Huntersville, North Carolina
G	11	Matt Fraschilla	5 ft 11 in (1.8 m)	165 lb (75 kg)	Fr	Dallas, Texas
F	14	Steve Moundou-Missi	6 ft 7 in (2.01 m)	225 lb (102 kg)	Jr	Yaoundé, Cameroon
G/F	20	Patrick Steeves	6 ft 7 in (2.01 m)	220 lb (100 kg)	So	Montreal, Quebec
G	21	Dee Giger	6 ft 6 in (1.98 m)	180 lb (82 kg)	Sr	Arden, North Carolina
G/F	23	Wesley Saunders	6 ft 5 in (1.96 m)	215 lb (98 kg)	Jr	Los Angeles, California
F	24	Jonah Travis	6 ft 6 in (1.98 m)	225 lb (102 kg)	Jr	Minneapolis, Minnesota
C	25	Kenyatta Smith	6 ft 8 in (2.03 m)	250 lb (113 kg)	Jr	Sun Valley, California
F	30	Kyle Casey	6 ft 7 in (2.01 m)	225 lb (102 kg)	Sr	Medway, Massachusetts
F	32	Charlie Anastasi	6 ft 6 in (1.98 m)	225 lb (102 kg)	Jr	Washington Crossing, Pennsylvania
F	33	Evan Cummins	6 ft 9 in (2.06 m)	215 lb (98 kg)	So	Westborough, Massachusetts
F	34	Tom Hamel	6 ft 9 in (2.06 m)	235 lb (107 kg)	Sr	Methuen, Massachusetts
G/F	35	Agunwa Okolie	6 ft 8 in (2.03 m)	205 lb (93 kg)	So	Ajax, Ontario
F/C	44	Michael Hall	6 ft 10 in (2.08 m)	205 lb (93 kg)	So	Atlanta, Georgia

Head coach

- Tommy Amaker (Duke)

Assistant coach(es)

- Brian DeStefano (Duke)
- Adam Cohen (Arizona)
- Christian Webster (Harvard)

Head Manager

- Basil Williams (Class of 2014)

Legend

- (C) Team captain
- (S) Suspended
- (I) Ineligible
- (W) Walk-on
- Injured
- Current redshirt

Roster
Last update: September 28, 2013

== Schedule ==
Harvard opened its season on November 10 with a victory over in-state Greater Boston rival Holy Cross at the TD Garden. They then defeated Cambridge rival MIT on November 12 in the home opener at Lavietes Pavilion. After scoring 14 points and adding 6 assists, 4 rebounds, 3 steals and 2 blocks while playing 37 minutes in the first game of the season, Curry missed the next three games due to a foot injury. After starting the season 4–0, the team lost its first game on the road against Pac-12 Conference Colorado on November 24. Curry re-aggravated his foot against Colorado and was described as out indefinitely by Amaker. In the 2013 Great Alaska Shootout, Harvard defeated Denver, Green Bay and TCU to win the November 27–30 tournament.

Date time, TV	Rank^{#}	Opponent^{#}	Result	Record	Site (attendance) city, state
Regular season
November 10, 2013*; 5:30 pm, NESN		vs. Holy Cross; Coaches vs. Cancer Classic Tip-Off	W 82–72	1–0	TD Garden (6,037); Boston, MA
November 12, 2013*; 7:00 pm		MIT	W 79–37	2–0	Lavietes Pavilion (1,414); Cambridge, Massachusetts
November 15, 2013*; 7:00 pm		Howard	W 76–44	3–0	Lavietes Pavilion (1,815); Cambridge, Massachusetts
November 20, 2013*; 7:00 pm		Bryant	W 86–68	4–0	Lavietes Pavilion (1,760); Cambridge, Massachusetts
November 24, 2013*; 4:30 pm, ESPNU		at Colorado	L 62–70	4–1	Coors Events Center (9,770); Boulder, CO
November 28, 2013*; 12:00 am, CBSSN		vs. Denver; Great Alaska Shootout first round	W 68–60	5–1	Sullivan Arena (3,923); Anchorage, AK
November 29, 2013*; 12:00 am, CBSSN		vs. Green Bay; Great Alaska Shootout semifinals	W 76–64	6–1	Sullivan Arena (4,064); Anchorage, AK
November 30, 2013*; 12:30 am, CBSSN		vs. TCU; Great Alaska Shootout championship	W 71–50	7–1	Sullivan Arena (4,253); Anchorage, AK
December 4, 2013*; 7:00 pm		at Northeastern	W 72–64	8–1	Matthews Arena (1,901); Boston, MA
December 7, 2013*; 1:00 pm		at Boston University	W 79–68	9–1	Case Gym (1,233); Boston, MA
December 21, 2013*; 4:00 pm		Vermont	W 74–68	10–1	Lavietes Pavilion (2,195); Cambridge, Massachusetts
December 28, 2013*; 4:00 pm, SNY		at Fordham	W 94–86	11–1	Rose Hill Gymnasium (3,200); Bronx, NY
January 1, 2014*; 4:00 pm		Boston College	W 73–58	12–1	Lavietes Pavilion (2,195); Cambridge, Massachusetts
January 4, 2014*; 8:00 pm, CBSSN		at Rice	W 69–54	13–1	Tudor Fieldhouse (1,762); Houston, TX
January 8, 2014*; 7:00 pm, ESPNU		at UConn	L 56–61	13–2	Gampel Pavilion (9,218); Storrs, CT
January 11, 2014; 2:00 pm		Dartmouth	W 61–45	14–2 (1–0)	Lavietes Pavilion (1,766); Cambridge, Massachusetts
January 21, 2014*; 7:00 pm		at Florida Atlantic	L 53–68	14–3	FAU Arena (2,315); Boca Raton, FL
January 26, 2014; 4:00 pm, NBCSN		at Dartmouth	W 80–50	15–3 (2–0)	Leede Arena (1,544); Hanover, NH
January 31, 2014; 7:00 pm		Princeton	W 82–76	16–3 (3–0)	Lavietes Pavilion (2,195); Cambridge, Massachusetts
February 1, 2014; 9:00 pm, NBCSN		Penn	W 80–50	17–3 (4–0)	Lavietes Pavilion (2,195); Cambridge, Massachusetts
February 7, 2014; 7:00 pm		Brown	W 52–45	18–3 (5–0)	Lavietes Pavilion (2,028); Cambridge, Massachusetts
February 8, 2014; 7:00 pm		Yale	L 67–74	18–4 (5–1)	Lavietes Pavilion (2,195); Cambridge, Massachusetts
February 14, 2014; 7:00 pm		at Columbia	W 88–84 ^{2OT}	19–4 (6–1)	Levien Gymnasium (2,474); New York City, NY
February 15, 2014; 7:00 pm		at Cornell	W 67–44	20–4 (7–1)	Newman Arena (1,342); Ithaca, NY
February 21, 2014; 7:00 pm		at Penn	W 83–63	21–4 (8–1)	Palestra (4,810); Philadelphia, PA
February 22, 2014; 8:00 pm, ESPN3		at Princeton	W 59–47	22–4 (9–1)	Jadwin Gymnasium (4,306); Princeton, NJ
February 28, 2014; 7:00 pm		Cornell	W 72–47	23–4 (10–1)	Lavietes Pavilion (2,195); Cambridge, Massachusetts
March 1, 2014; 7:00 pm		Columbia	W 80–47	24–4 (11–1)	Lavietes Pavilion (2,195); Cambridge, Massachusetts
March 7, 2014; 7:30 pm, NBCSN		at Yale	W 70–58	25–4 (12–1)	Payne Whitney Gymnasium (2,532); New Haven, CT
March 8, 2014; 7:00 pm		at Brown	W 98–93 ^{OT}	26–4 (13–1)	Pizzitola Sports Center (2,226); Providence, RI
NCAA tournament
March 20, 2014; 2:10 pm, TNT	No. (12 E)	vs. No. 15 (5 E) Cincinnati; Second Round	W 61–57	27–4	Spokane Veterans Memorial Arena (10,862); Spokane, WA
March 22, 2014; 8:40 pm, TNT	No. (12 E)	vs. No. 11 (4 E) Michigan State; Third Round	L 73–80	27–5	Spokane Veterans Memorial Arena (11,623); Spokane, WA
*Non-conference game. ^{#}Rankings from AP Poll, (#) during NCAA Tournament is seed within region E=East. (#) Tournament seedings in parentheses. All times are in Eastern Time.

== Honors ==
On March 11 Saunders was named to the District I (ME, VT, NH, RI, MA, CT) team by the United States Basketball Writers Association (USBWA). Saunders was listed on The National Association of Basketball Coaches Division I All-District 13 first team on March 12.

== Rankings ==
Ranking movements Legend: RV = Received votes
	Week																				
Poll	Pre	1	2	3	4	5	6	7	8	9	10	11	12	13	14	15	16	17	18	19	Final
AP Poll	RV	RV	RV	RV	RV	RV	RV	RV	RV	RV	RV	RV	RV	RV				RV	RV	RV	N/A
Coaches Poll	RV	RV	RV	RV						RV	RV	RV		RV				RV	RV	RV	RV
