= 2013–14 UConn Huskies men's basketball team =

American college basketball season

2013–14 UConn Huskies men's basketball

NCAA tournament National Champions 2K Sports Classic champions

National Championship Game, W 60–54 vs. Kentucky
- Conference: American Athletic Conference

Ranking
- Coaches: No. 1
- AP: No. 18
- Record: 32–8 (12–6 The American)
- Head coach: Kevin Ollie (2nd season)
- Assistant coaches: Glen Miller; Karl Hobbs; Ricky Moore
- Home arena: Harry A. Gampel Pavilion; XL Center

2013–14 American Athletic Conference men's basketball standings
	Conf.				Overall
Team	W		L	PCT	W		L	PCT
No. 5 Louisville* †	15	–	3	.833	31	–	6	.838
No. 15 Cincinnati	15	–	3	.833	27	–	7	.794
No. 18 UConn	12	–	6	.667	32	–	8	.800
SMU	12	–	6	.667	27	–	10	.730
Memphis	12	–	6	.667	24	–	10	.706
Houston	8	–	10	.444	17	–	16	.515
Rutgers	5	–	13	.278	12	–	21	.364
UCF	4	–	14	.222	13	–	18	.419
Temple	4	–	14	.222	9	–	22	.290
South Florida	3	–	15	.167	12	–	20	.375
† The American Tournament winner As of March 15th, 2014; *Louisville: 29 reg. season games, 3 postseason games vacated due to sanctions against the program; Disputed Record-(31-6)(15-3); Rankings from AP poll

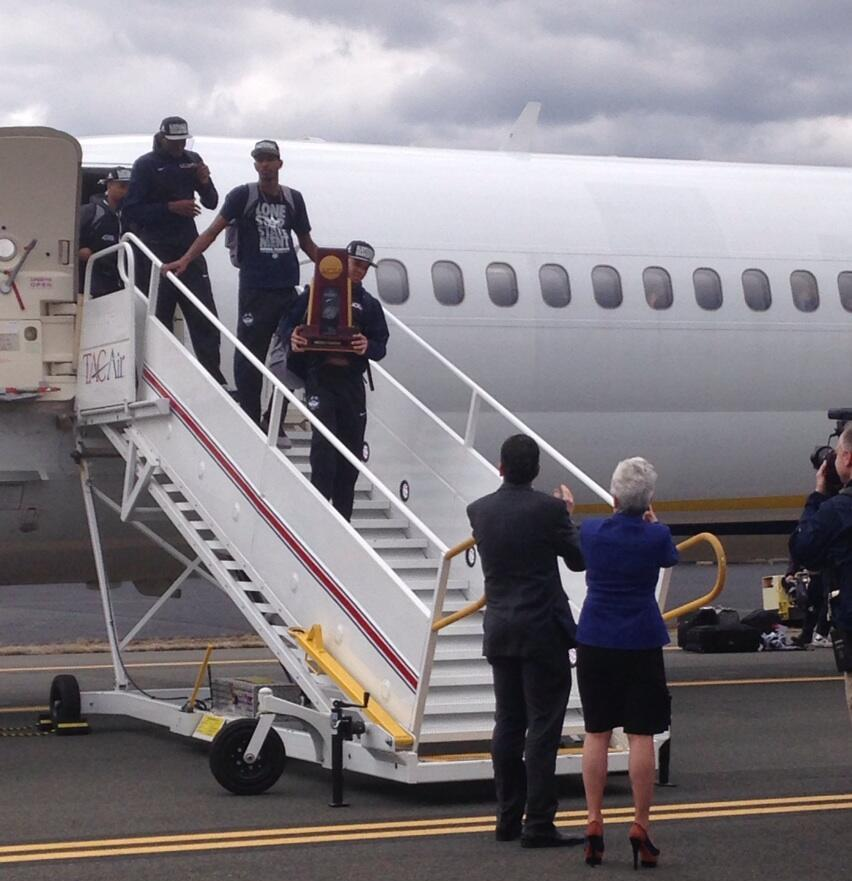
Huskies players return to Connecticut after winning the championship game, being greeted at Bradley International Airport by Connecticut Governor Dannel Malloy and Lieutenant Governor Nancy Wyman.

The 2013–14 UConn Huskies men's basketball team represented the University of Connecticut in the 2013–2014 NCAA Division I basketball season. The Huskies were led by second-year head coach Kevin Ollie. The Huskies split their home games between the XL Center in Hartford, Connecticut, and the Harry A. Gampel Pavilion on the UConn campus in Storrs, Connecticut. The Huskies were members of the American Athletic Conference.

One year after being banned from postseason play for sanctions, the Huskies returned to the Final Four, where they defeated the Florida Gators 63–53 in the national semifinal round and the Kentucky Wildcats in the 2014 National Championship Game 60–54. Shabazz Napier was named the tournament's MOP. The next day, the UConn Huskies women's team won the women's NCAA basketball tournament, only the second time that a school has won both the men's and women's Division I national basketball championships in the same year; UConn first accomplished this in 2004.

== Previous season ==
The Huskies finished the 2012–13 season with a record of 20–10 overall, including 10–8 in Big East play. However, due to sanctions resulting in penalties stemming from years of very poor APR ratings, the Huskies were ineligible for all the postseason tournaments, including the 2013 Big East men's basketball tournament, the NCAA tournament and the NIT.

== Preseason outlook ==
The Huskies were selected to finish 2nd in their new conference, the American Athletic Conference (AAC). Coach Kevin Ollie would serve his second season with key players Shabazz Napier, Ryan Boatright, DeAndre Daniels, and Omar Calhoun returned. The Huskies were ranked 17th in the preseason AP poll.

== Departures ==
Name	Number	Pos.	Height	Weight	Year	Hometown	Notes
Enosch Wolf	1	C	7'1"	260	Junior	Göttingen, GER	Signed to play professionally in Germany
Brendan Allen	4	G	6'3"	187	Sophomore	Windsor, CT	No longer on official team roster
R.J. Evans	12	G	6'3"	200	RS Senior	Salem, CT	Graduated

== Roster ==
2013–14 UConn Huskies men's basketball team
Players
Coaches

Pos.	#	Name	Height	Weight	Year	Previous school	Hometown
PF	0	Phillip Nolan	6 ft 10 in (2.08 m)	212 lb (96 kg)	So	Riverside University	Milwaukee, WI
SF	2	DeAndre Daniels	6 ft 9 in (2.06 m)	195 lb (88 kg)	Jr	Taft; IMG Academy	Los Angeles, CA
PG	3	Terrence Samuel	6 ft 4 in (1.93 m)	190 lb (86 kg)	Fr	Victory Collegiate	Brooklyn, NY
SG	5	Niels Giffey	6 ft 7 in (2.01 m)	205 lb (93 kg)	Sr	Heinrich Schliemann	Berlin, Germany
PF	10	Tyler Olander	6 ft 10 in (2.08 m)	230 lb (104 kg)	Sr	E. O. Smith	Mansfield, CT
PG	11	Ryan Boatright	6 ft 0 in (1.83 m)	168 lb (76 kg)	Jr	East Aurora	Aurora, IL
PF	12	Kentan Facey	6 ft 9 in (2.06 m)	200 lb (91 kg)	Fr	Long Island (NY) Lutheran	Trelawny, Jamaica
PG	13	Shabazz Napier	6 ft 1 in (1.85 m)	180 lb (82 kg)	Sr	Charlestown; Lawrence Academy	Roxbury, MA
SG	14	Pat Lenehan (W)	6 ft 3 in (1.91 m)	181 lb (82 kg)	Jr	Xavier (CT)	Middletown, CT
SF	20	Lasan Kromah	6 ft 6 in (1.98 m)	201 lb (91 kg)	GS	Eleanor Roosevelt; George Washington University	Greenbelt, MD
SG	21	Omar Calhoun	6 ft 6 in (1.98 m)	200 lb (91 kg)	So	Christ the King	Brooklyn, NY
SF	22	Leon Tolksdorf	6 ft 8 in (2.03 m)	218 lb (99 kg)	So	Leibniz-Oberschule	Berlin, Germany
SG	23	Nnamdi Amilo (W)	6 ft 4 in (1.93 m)	225 lb (102 kg)	So	Avon Old Farms	New Fairfield, CT
PG	25	Tor Watts (W)	6 ft 1 in (1.85 m)	202 lb (92 kg)	Sr	York Prep	Brooklyn, NY
C	35	Amida Brimah	7 ft 0 in (2.13 m)	217 lb (98 kg)	Fr	Archbishop Coleman F. Carroll	Accra, Ghana
SG	44	Rodney Purvis (I) (redshirt)	6 ft 4 in (1.93 m)	203 lb (92 kg)	So	Upper Room Christian Academy	Raleigh, NC

Head coach

- Kevin Ollie

Assistant coach(es)

- Karl Hobbs
- Glen Miller
- Ricky Moore

Legend

- (C) Team captain
- (S) Suspended
- (I) Ineligible
- (W) Walk-on
- Injured
- Current redshirt

Roster
Last update: 2013-10-23

== Schedule ==
Date time, TV	Rank^{#}	Opponent^{#}	Result	Record	Site (attendance) city, state
Exhibition
10/30/2013*; 7:00 pm		Southern Connecticut State	W 93–65	–	Gampel Pavilion; Storrs, CT
11/04/2013*; 7:00 pm		Concordia	W 98–38	–	XL Center (5,504); Hartford, CT
Regular Season
11/08/2013*; 6:30 pm, ESPN2	No. 18	vs. Maryland	W 78–77	1–0	Barclays Center (12,867); Brooklyn, NY
11/11/2013*; 3:00 pm, SNY	No. 19	Yale	W 80–62	2–0	XL Center (8,848); Hartford, CT
11/14/2013*; 7:00 pm, SNY	No. 19	Detroit; 2K Sports Classic	W 101–55	3–0	Gampel Pavilion (8,140); Storrs, CT
11/17/2013*; 12:00 pm, ESPNU	No. 19	Boston University; 2K Sports Classic	W 77–60	4–0	Gampel Pavilion (9,195); Storrs, CT
11/21/2013*; 7:00 pm, ESPN2	No. 18	vs. Boston College; 2K Sports Classic Semifinals	W 72–70	5–0	Madison Square Garden (10,064); New York City, NY
11/22/2013*; 7:30 pm, ESPN2	No. 18	vs. Indiana; 2K Sports Classic Championship	W 59–58	6–0	Madison Square Garden (10,051); New York City, NY
11/26/2013*; 7:00 pm, SNY	No. 13	Loyola (MD)	W 76–66	7–0	XL Center (9,497); Hartford, CT
12/02/2013*; 7:00 pm, ESPN2	No. 12	No. 15 Florida	W 65–64	8–0	Gampel Pavilion (10,167); Storrs, CT
12/06/2013*; 7:00 pm, ESPN3/SNY	No. 12	Maine	W 95–68	9–0	XL Center (9,681); Hartford, CT
12/18/2013*; 9:00 pm, ESPN2	No. 10	Stanford	L 51–53	9–1	XL Center (11,140); Hartford, CT
12/22/2013*; 3:30 pm, ESPNU	No. 10	at Washington	W 82–70	10–1	Alaska Airlines Arena (7,059); Seattle, WA
12/28/2013*; 1:00 pm, SNY	No. 15	Eastern Washington	W 82–65	11–1	Webster Bank Arena (9,274); Bridgeport, CT
12/31/2013; 9:00 pm, ESPN2	No. 17	at Houston	L 71–75	11–2 (0–1)	Hofheinz Pavilion (4,035); Houston, TX
01/04/2014; 2:00 pm, ESPNU		at SMU	L 65–74	11–3 (0–2)	Moody Coliseum (7,166); Dallas, TX
01/08/2014*; 7:00 pm, ESPNU		Harvard	W 61–56	12–3	Gampel Pavilion (9,218); Storrs, CT
01/11/2014; 6:00 pm, ESPNU		Central Florida	W 84–61	13–3 (1–2)	Gampel Pavilion (9,561); Storrs, CT
01/16/2014; 7:00 pm, ESPN		at No. 17 Memphis	W 83–73	14–3 (2–2)	FedEx Forum (18,039); Memphis, TN
01/18/2014; 9:00 pm, ESPN		No. 18 Louisville; ESPN College GameDay	L 64–76	14–4 (2–3)	Gampel Pavilion (10,167); Storrs, CT
01/21/2014; 7:00 pm, CBSSN		Temple	W 90–66	15–4 (3–3)	XL Center (4,741); Hartford, CT
01/25/2014; 7:00 pm, ESPNU		at Rutgers	W 82–71	16–4 (4–3)	The RAC (8,006); Piscataway, NJ
01/30/2014; 9:00 pm, CBSSN		Houston	W 80–43	17–4 (5–3)	Gampel Pavilion (9,312); Storrs, CT
02/06/2014; 7:00 pm, ESPN	No. 22	at No. 7 Cincinnati	L 58–63	17–5 (5–4)	Fifth Third Arena (12,432); Cincinnati, OH
02/09/2014; 6:00 pm, ESPN2	No. 22	at Central Florida	W 75–55	18–5 (6–4)	CFE Arena (6,312); Orlando, FL
02/12/2014; 7:00 pm, ESPN2	No. 24	South Florida	W 83–40	19–5 (7–4)	XL Center (10,553); Hartford, CT
02/15/2014; 12:00 pm, ESPN	No. 24	No. 20 Memphis	W 86–81 ^{OT}	20–5 (8–4)	XL Center (16,294); Hartford, CT
02/20/2014; 9:00 pm, ESPN	No. 21	at Temple	W 68–55	21–5 (9–4)	Liacouras Center (6,053); Philadelphia, PA
02/23/2014; 2:00 pm, CBSSN	No. 21	SMU	L 55–64	21–6 (9–5)	Gampel Pavilion (10,167); Storrs, CT
02/26/2014; 7:00 pm, CBSSN		at South Florida	W 61–56	22–6 (10–5)	USF Sun Dome (5,115); Tampa, FL
03/01/2014; 12:00 pm, ESPN		No. 11 Cincinnati	W 51–45	23–6 (11–5)	XL Center (16,294); Hartford, CT
03/05/2014; 7:00 pm, ESPNU	No. 19	Rutgers	W 69–63	24–6 (12–5)	Gampel Pavilion (10,167); Storrs, CT
03/08/2014; 2:00 pm, CBS	No. 19	at No. 11 Louisville	L 48–81	24–7 (12–6)	KFC Yum! Center (22,782); Louisville, KY
AAC Tournament
03/13/2014; 9:00 pm, ESPNU	(4) No. 21	vs. (5) No. 19 Memphis; Quarterfinals	W 72–53	25–7	FedEx Forum (13,081); Memphis, TN
03/14/2014; 9:00 pm, ESPN2	(4) No. 21	vs. (1) No. 13 Cincinnati; Semifinals	W 58–56	26–7	FedEx Forum (11,888); Memphis, TN
03/15/2014; 6:00 pm, ESPN	(4) No. 21	vs. (2) No. 5 Louisville; Championship	L 61–71	26–8	FedEx Forum (13,554); Memphis, TN
NCAA tournament
03/20/2014*; 6:55 pm, TBS	(7 E) No. 18	vs. (10 E) Saint Joseph's; Second Round	W 89–81 ^{OT}	27–8	First Niagara Center (18,706); Buffalo, NY
03/22/2014*; 9:40 pm, TBS	(7 E) No. 18	vs. (2 E) No. 6 Villanova; Third Round	W 77–65	28–8	First Niagara Center (19,290); Buffalo, NY
03/28/2014*; 7:27 pm, TBS	(7 E) No. 18	vs. (3 E) No. 9 Iowa State; Sweet Sixteen	W 81–76	29–8	Madison Square Garden (19,314); New York, NY
03/30/2014*; 2:20 pm, CBS	(7 E) No. 18	vs. (4 E) No. 11 Michigan State; Elite Eight	W 60–54	30–8	Madison Square Garden (19,499); New York, NY
04/05/2014*; 6:09 pm, TBS	(7 E) No. 18	vs. (1 S) No. 1 Florida; Final Four	W 63–53	31–8	AT&T Stadium (79,444); Arlington, TX
04/07/2014*; 9:10 pm, CBS	(7 E) No. 18	vs. (8 MW) Kentucky; National Championship Game	W 60–54	32–8	AT&T Stadium (79,238); Arlington, TX
*Non-conference game. ^{#}Rankings from AP Poll. (#) Tournament seedings in parentheses. E=East Region, S=South Region, MW=Midwest Region. All times are in Eastern Time.

== Rankings ==
Legend: ██ Increase in ranking. ██ Decrease in ranking.
Poll	Pre	Wk 2	Wk 3	Wk 4	Wk 5	Wk 6	Wk 7	Wk 8	Wk 9	Wk 10	Wk 11	Wk 12	Wk 13	Wk 14	Wk 15	Wk 16	Wk 17	Wk 18	Wk 19	Wk 20	Final
AP	18	19	18	13	12	9	10	15	17	RV	RV	RV	RV	22	24	21	RV	19	21	18	N/A
Coaches	19	20	18	14	14	12	10	15	15	RV	RV	RV	RV	RV	RV	21	RV	19	21	19	1
