= 2013–14 Penn Quakers men's basketball team =

American college basketball season

2013–14 Penn Quakers men's basketball
- Conference: Ivy League
- Record: 8–20 (5–9 Ivy)
- Head coach: Jerome Allen (5th season)
- Assistant coaches: Scott Pera; Ira Bowman; Jason Polykoff
- Home arena: The Palestra

2013–14 Ivy League men's basketball standings
	Conf.				Overall
Team	W		L	PCT	W		L	PCT
x-Harvard	13	–	1	.929	27	–	5	.844
Yale	9	–	5	.643	19	–	14	.576
Princeton	8	–	6	.571	21	–	9	.700
Columbia	8	–	6	.571	21	–	13	.618
Brown	7	–	7	.500	15	–	14	.517
Dartmouth	5	–	9	.357	12	–	16	.429
Penn	5	–	9	.357	8	–	20	.286
Cornell	1	–	13	.071	2	–	26	.071
Rankings from AP Poll x-Ivy League champion

The 2013–14 Penn Quakers men's basketball team represented the University of Pennsylvania during the 2013–14 NCAA Division I men's basketball season. The Quakers, led by fifth year head coach Jerome Allen, played their home games at The Palestra and are members of the Ivy League.

They finished the season 8–20, 5–9 in Ivy League play to finish in a tie for sixth place.

== Roster ==
Number	Name	Position	Height	Weight	Year	Hometown
0	Miles Jackson-Cartwright	Guard	6–3	175	Senior	Van Nuys, California
1	Tony Hicks	Guard	6–2	170	Sophomore	South Holland, Illinois
3	Henry Brooks	Forward	6–8	215	Junior	Fairburn, Georgia
4	Jamal Lewis	Guard	6–0	160	Sophomore	Springdale, Maryland
5	Julian Harrell	Guard	6–5	195	Sophomore	Los Angeles
10	Darien Nelson-Henry	Center	6–11	265	Sophomore	Kirkland, Washington
11	Tony Bagtas	Guard	5–11	160	Freshman	Union City, Georgia
12	Fran Dougherty	Forward	6–8	225	Senior	New Britain, Pennsylvania
13	Dylan Jones	Forward	6–8	215	Freshman	Houston, Texas
15	Camryn Crocker	Guard	6–3	170	Junior	Cypress, California
20	Dau Jok	Guard	6–4	180	Senior	Des Moines, Iowa
21	Cameron Gunter	Forward/Center	6–9	205	Senior	Morton, Pennsylvania
22	Steve Rennard	Guard	6–2	175	Senior	Hazlet, New Jersey
23	Greg Louis	Forward	6–7	215	Junior	West Palm Beach, Florida
24	Matt Howard	Guard	6–4	185	Freshman	Columbia, South Carolina
30	Patrick Lucas-Perry	Guard	5–11	165	Junior	Grand Blanc, Michigan
32	Preston Troutt	Guard	5–11	165	Freshman	Dallas

== Schedule ==
Date time, TV	Opponent	Result	Record	Site (attendance) city, state
Regular season
11/09/2013*; 5:00 pm	Temple	L 73–78	0–1	Palestra (8,722); Philadelphia
11/12/2013*; 7:00 pm	at Monmouth	W 79–73	1–1	Multipurpose Activity Center (2,105); West Long Branch, New Jersey
11/16/2013*; 2:00 pm	Penn State	L 71–83	1–2	Palestra (4,130); Philadelphia
11/22/2013*; 7:00 pm, BTN	at Iowa	L 55–86	1–3	Carver–Hawkeye Arena (15,400); Iowa City, Iowa
11/26/2013*; 7:00 pm	Niagara	W 85–66	2–3	Palestra (2,431); Philadelphia
11/30/2013*; 2:00 pm	at Lafayette	L 76–79	2–4	Kirby Sports Center (1,147); Easton, Pennsylvania
12/04/2013*; 8:00 pm, FS1	at No. 14 Villanova	L 54–77	2–5	The Pavilion (6,500); Villanova, Pennsylvania
12/07/2013*; 7:00 pm	Wagner	L 69–75	2–6	Palestra (1,625); Philadelphia
12/22/2013*; 2:00 pm	at Marist	L 62–76	2–7	McCann Field House (1,050); Poughkeepsie, New York
12/29/2013*; 12:00 pm, TCN	at Rider	L 88–89	2–8	Alumni Gymnasium (1,629); Lawrenceville, New Jersey
01/02/2014*; 7:30 pm, NBCSN	at George Mason	L 77–80	2–9	Patriot Center (3,531); Fairfax, Virginia
01/04/2014*; 4:00 pm	La Salle	L 57–76	2–10	Palestra (3,956); Philadelphia
01/11/2014; 6:00 pm, NBCSN	Princeton; Rivalry	W 77–74	3–10 (1–0)	Palestra (6,322); Philadelphia
01/18/2014*; 7:00 pm	Saint Joseph's	L 68–85	3–11	Palestra (8,722); Philadelphia
01/25/2014*; 7:30 pm	NJIT	W 89–74	4–11	Palestra (2,455); Philadelphia
01/31/2014; 7:00 pm	at Dartmouth	L 58–67	4–12 (1–1)	Leede Arena (802); Hanover, New Hampshire
02/01/2014; 7:00 pm, NBCSN	at Harvard	L 50–80	4–13 (1–2)	Lavietes Pavilion (2,195); Cambridge, Massachusetts
02/07/2014; 7:00 pm	Cornell	W 90–83	5–13 (2–2)	Palestra (2,356); Philadelphia
02/08/2014; 7:00 pm	Columbia	W 68–60	6–13 (3–2)	Palestra (3,128); Philadelphia
02/14/2014; 7:00 pm	at Yale	L 54–69	6–14 (3–3)	John J. Lee Amphitheater (1,128); New Haven, Connecticut
02/15/2014; 7:00 pm	at Brown	L 55–62	6–15 (3–4)	Pizzitola Sports Center (785); Providence, Rhode Island
02/21/2014; 7:00 pm	Harvard	L 63–83	6–16 (3–5)	Palestra (4,810); Philadelphia
02/22/2014; 7:00 pm	Dartmouth	W 74–65	7–16 (4–5)	Palestra (3,646); Philadelphia
02/28/2014; 7:00 pm, NBCSN	Brown	L 67–76	7–17 (4–6)	Palestra (3,146); Philadelphia
03/01/2014; 7:00 pm	Yale	L 63–70	7–18 (4–7)	Palestra (4,526); Philadelphia, Pennsylvania
03/07/2014; 7:00 pm	at Columbia	L 55–74	7–19 (4–8)	Levien Gymnasium (2,378); New York City
03/08/2014; 7:00 pm	at Cornell	W 69–65	8–19 (5–8)	Newman Arena (1,042); Ithaca, New York
03/11/2014; 8:00 pm	at Princeton; Rivalry	L 65–70	8–20 (5–9)	Jadwin Gymnasium (2,273); Princeton, New Jersey
*Non-conference game. ^{#}Rankings from AP Poll. (#) Tournament seedings in parentheses. All times are in Eastern Time.
