= 2013–14 Cornell Big Red men's basketball team =

American college basketball season

2013–14 Cornell Big Red men's basketball
- Conference: Ivy League
- Record: 2–26 (1–13 Ivy)
- Head coach: Bill Courtney (4th season)
- Assistant coaches: Marlon Sears; Mike Blaine; Jon Jaques
- Home arena: Newman Arena

2013–14 Ivy League men's basketball standings
	Conf.				Overall
Team	W		L	PCT	W		L	PCT
x-Harvard	13	–	1	.929	27	–	5	.844
Yale	9	–	5	.643	19	–	14	.576
Princeton	8	–	6	.571	21	–	9	.700
Columbia	8	–	6	.571	21	–	13	.618
Brown	7	–	7	.500	15	–	14	.517
Dartmouth	5	–	9	.357	12	–	16	.429
Penn	5	–	9	.357	8	–	20	.286
Cornell	1	–	13	.071	2	–	26	.071
Rankings from AP Poll x-Ivy League champion

The 2013–14 Cornell Big Red men's basketball team represented Cornell University during the 2013–14 NCAA Division I men's basketball season. The Big Red, led by fourth year head coach Bill Courtney, played their home games at Newman Arena and were members of the Ivy League.

They finished the season 2–26, 1–13 in Ivy League play to finish in last place.

== Roster ==
Number	Name	Position	Height	Weight	Year	Hometown
0	David Onourah	Forward	6–9	230	Freshman	Atlanta, Georgia
1	Darryl Smith	Guard	6–2	180	Freshman	Chesapeake, Virginia
3	Nolan Cressler	Guard	6–4	198	Sophomore	Pittsburgh, Pennsylvania
4	Dave LaMore	Forward/Center	6–9	225	Junior	Whitmore Lake, Michigan
5	Robert Hatter	Guard	6–2	165	Freshman	Houston, Texas
11	Desmond Fleming	Guard	5–11	180	Freshman	The Woodlands, Texas
12	Dominick Scelfo	Guard	6–3	185	Senior	Kenner, Louisiana
15	Braxston Bunce	Center	6–11	250	Sophomore	Kelowna, Canada
20	Jake Matthews	Guard	6–2	160	Senior	Greensburg, Pennsylvania
22	Robert Mischler	Guard	6–3	183	Sophomore	Mishawaka, Indiana
23	JoJo Fallas	Guard	5–11	175	Freshman	Los Angeles, California
24	Devin Cherry	Guard	6–3	185	Junior	Meridian, Mississippi
32	Shonn Miller	Forward	6–7	210	Junior	Euclid, Ohio
33	Dwight Tarwater	Forward	6–6	230	Senior	Knoxville, Tennessee
35	Nenad Tomic	Forward	6–7	220	Junior	North Royalton, Ohio
50	Deion Giddens	Forward/Center	6–9	202	Junior	Bitburg, Germany

== Schedule ==
Date time, TV	Opponent	Result	Record	Site (attendance) city, state
Regular season
11/08/2013*; 7:00 pm, ACCN	at No. 8 Syracuse	L 60–82	0–1	Carrier Dome (24,788); Syracuse, NY
11/10/2013*; 4:00 pm	Loyola (MD)	L 89–93	0–2	Newman Arena (1,444); Ithaca, NY
11/13/2013*; 7:00 pm	Binghamton	L 79–89	0–3	Newman Arena (1,113); Ithaca, NY
11/15/2013*; 7:00 pm, ESPN3	at No. 3 Louisville	L 54–99	0–4	KFC Yum! Center (19,834); Louisville, KY
11/20/2013*; 7:00 pm	at Colgate	L 58–81	0–5	Cotterell Court (740); Hamilton, NY
11/22/2013*; 7:00 pm	Siena	L 70–71	0–6	Newman Arena (1,471); Ithaca, NY
11/25/2013*; 7:00 pm	Radford	L 71–86	0–7	Newman Arena (644); Ithaca, NY
11/29/2013*; 7:00 pm	at Western Michigan	L 70–83	0–8	University Arena (2,566); Kalamazoo, MI
12/01/2013*; 1:00 pm, ESPN3	at Notre Dame	L 67–101	0–9	Edmund P. Joyce Center (8,636); South Bend, IN
12/07/2013*; 4:00 pm	Saint Francis (PA)	L 62–72	0–10	Newman Arena (1,241); Ithaca, NY
12/22/2013*; 7:00 pm	at Stony Brook	L 54–76	0–11	Pritchard Gymnasium (1,630); Stony Brook, NY
12/28/2013*; 2:00 pm	at Saint Peter's	L 59–67	0–12	Yanitelli Center (261); Jersey City, NJ
01/04/2014*; 2:00 pm, NBCSN	at St. Bonaventure	L 57–81	0–13	Reilly Center (3,244); Olean, NY
01/11/2014*; 2:00 pm	Oberlin College	W 77–55	1–13	Newman Arena (2,104); Ithaca, NY
01/18/2014; 7:00 pm	at Columbia	L 61–71	1–14 (0–1)	Levien Gymnasium (2,445); New York City, NY
01/25/2014; 12:00 pm	Columbia	L 58–74	1–15 (0–2)	Newman Arena (3,470); Ithaca, NY
01/31/2014; 7:00 pm	at Brown	L 66–78	1–16 (0–3)	Pizzitola Sports Center (1,216); Providence, RI
02/01/2014; 7:00 pm	at Yale	L 57–61	1–17 (0–4)	John J. Lee Amphitheater (1,027); New Haven, CT
02/07/2014; 7:00 pm	at Penn	L 83–90	1–18 (0–5)	Palestra (2,356); Philadelphia, PA
02/08/2014; 6:00 pm	at Princeton	L 48–69	1–19 (0–6)	Jadwin Gymnasium (2,964); Princeton, NJ
02/14/2014; 7:00 pm	Dartmouth	W 70–67	2–19 (1–6)	Newman Arena (1,411); Ithaca, NY
02/15/2014; 7:00 pm	Harvard	L 44–67	2–20 (1–7)	Newman Arena (1,342); Ithaca, NY
02/21/2014; 7:00 pm	Yale	L 65–82	2–21 (1–8)	Newman Arena (1,054); Ithaca, NY
02/22/2014; 8:00 pm, NBCSN	Brown	L 75–81	2–22 (1–9)	Newman Arena (1,144); Ithaca, NY
02/28/2014; 7:00 pm	at Harvard	L 47–72	2–23 (1–10)	Lavietes Pavilion (2,195); Cambridge, MA
03/01/2014; 7:00 pm	at Dartmouth	L 78–87	2–24 (1–11)	Leede Arena (757); Hanover, NH
03/07/2014; 7:00 pm	Princeton	L 51–91	2–25 (1–12)	Newman Arena (1,017); Ithaca, NY
03/08/2014; 7:00 pm	Penn	L 65–69	2–26 (1–13)	Newman Arena (1,042); Ithaca, NY
*Non-conference game. ^{#}Rankings from AP Poll. (#) Tournament seedings in parentheses. All times are in Eastern Time.
