= 2013 Great Alaska Shootout =

American college basketball tournament

- Season: 2013–14
- Teams: 8 (men's), 4 (women's)
- Finals site: Sullivan Arena, Anchorage, Alaska
- Champions: Harvard (men's); Georgetown (women's)
- MVP: Wesley Saunders, Harvard (men's); Andrea White, Georgetown (women's)

The 2013 Carrs/Safeway Great Alaska Shootout was the 35th Great Alaska Shootout, the annual college basketball tournament in Anchorage, Alaska that features colleges from all over the United States. The event is scheduled from November 27 through November 30, 2013, with eight colleges and universities participating in the men's tournament and four universities participating in the women's tournament. Most of the games in the men's tournament were televised on the CBS Sports Network.

== Brackets ==
=== Men's ===
5th Place Game; November 30
Indiana State	73
Pepperdine	70
7th Place Game
Denver	78
Alaska Anchorage	71

Consolation 2nd Round; November 29
Indiana State	97
Alaska Anchorage	87
Pepperdine	68
Denver	56

First Round; November 27, 28
Tulsa	63
Indiana State	62
TCU	73
Alaska Anchorage	70
Pepperdine	89
Green Bay	97
Denver	60
Harvard	68

Semifinals; November 29
Tulsa	65
TCU	72
Green Bay	64
Harvard	76

Championship; November 30
TCU	50
Harvard	71
3rd Place Game
Tulsa	59
Green Bay	67

=== Women's ===
Semi-Finals; November 26
Nicholls State	55
Georgetown	76
UC Riverside	75
Alaska Anchorage	83

Championship; November 27
Georgetown	92
Alaska Anchorage	78
3rd Place game November 27
Nicholls State	74
UC Riverside	64
