= 2013–14 Longwood Lancers men's basketball team =

American college basketball season

2013–14 Longwood Lancers men's basketball
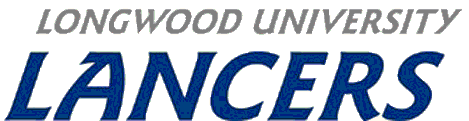
- Conference: Big South Conference
- North Division
- Record: 8–24 (3–13 Big South)
- Head coach: Jayson Gee (1st season)
- Assistant coaches: Jake Luhn (1st season); Cade Lemcke (1st season); Andy Ferrell (1st season)
- Home arena: Willett Hall

2013–14 Big South men's basketball standings
| | Conf. | | | | Overall |
| Team | W | | L | PCT | W | | L | PCT |
|---|---|---|---|---|---|---|---|---|
North
| High Point | 12 | – | 4 | .750 | 16 | – | 15 | .516 |
| VMI | 11 | – | 5 | .688 | 22 | – | 13 | .629 |
| Radford | 10 | – | 6 | .625 | 22 | – | 13 | .629 |
| Campbell | 6 | – | 10 | .375 | 12 | – | 20 | .375 |
| Liberty | 5 | – | 11 | .313 | 11 | – | 21 | .344 |
| Longwood | 3 | – | 13 | .188 | 8 | – | 24 | .250 |
South
| Coastal Carolina † | 11 | – | 5 | .688 | 21 | – | 13 | .618 |
| Winthrop | 10 | – | 6 | .625 | 20 | – | 13 | .606 |
| Gardner–Webb | 10 | – | 6 | .625 | 18 | – | 15 | .545 |
| UNC Asheville | 10 | – | 6 | .625 | 17 | – | 15 | .531 |
| Charleston Southern | 6 | – | 10 | .375 | 13 | – | 18 | .419 |
| Presbyterian | 2 | – | 14 | .125 | 6 | – | 26 | .188 |
† 2014 Big South tournament winner

The 2013–14 Longwood Lancers men's basketball team represented Longwood University during the 2013–14 NCAA Division I men's basketball season. The Lancers, led by first year head coach Jayson Gee, played their home games at Willett Hall and were members of the North Division of the Big South Conference. They finished the season 8–24, 3–13 in Big South play to finish in last place in the North division.

Longwood lost in the first round of the Big South tournament to Gardner–Webb.

== Roster ==
2013–14 Longwood Lancers men's basketball team
Players
Coaches

| Pos. | # | Name | Height | Weight | Year | Previous school | Hometown |
|---|---|---|---|---|---|---|---|
| C | 0 | Charlie Lockwood | 6 ft 10 in (2.08 m) | 210 lb (95 kg) | Fr | Inglewood | Inglewood, CA |
| G | 1 | Leron Fisher | 5 ft 11 in (1.8 m) | 160 lb (73 kg) | So | Lake Clifton/Allan Hancock | Baltimore, MD |
| G | 2 | Lucas Woodhouse | 6 ft 1 in (1.85 m) | 155 lb (70 kg) | So | Harborfields | Greenlawn, NY |
| G | 3 | Darrion Allen | 6 ft 2 in (1.88 m) | 165 lb (75 kg) | Fr | Blanche Ely | Pompano Beach, FL |
| F | 4 | Eric Shaw | 6 ft 7 in (2.01 m) | 192 lb (87 kg) | Fr | Middleburg | Stafford, VA |
| G | 5 | Curtis Rowser III | 6 ft 1 in (1.85 m) | 165 lb (75 kg) | Fr | Middleburg | Stafford, VA |
| G | 12 | Tristan Carey | 6 ft 4 in (1.93 m) | 185 lb (84 kg) | RS Sr | Colonial Beach/La Salle | Colonial Beach, VA |
| G | 13 | David Robinson | 6 ft 4 in (1.93 m) | 190 lb (86 kg) | Sr | Cosby | Chesterfield, VA |
| G | 15 | Isaac Belton | 6 ft 4 in (1.93 m) | 205 lb (93 kg) | Fr | Virginia Episcopal/Fork Union | Salem, VA |
| F | 20 | Karl Ziegler | 6 ft 5 in (1.96 m) | 215 lb (98 kg) | So | Annandale/Fishburne | Annandale, VA |
| G/F | 21 | Mark Parker | 6 ft 7 in (2.01 m) | 210 lb (95 kg) | Sr | West Johnston | Clayton, NC |
| F | 22 | Jaylani Dublin | 6 ft 6 in (1.98 m) | 225 lb (102 kg) | RS Jr | Millbrook | Brooklyn, NY |
| F | 24 | Damarion Geter | 6 ft 7 in (2.01 m) | 215 lb (98 kg) | Fr | Dunbar | Dayton, OH |
| G | 30 | Tyler Akers | 6 ft 4 in (1.93 m) | 180 lb (82 kg) | Jr | George Wythe/Roanoke College | Wytheville, VA |
| F | 44 | Jeff Havenstein | 6 ft 8 in (2.03 m) | 230 lb (104 kg) | Sr | Linganore | Mt. Airy, MD |

Head coach

- Jayson Gee (University of Charleston)

Assistant coach(es)

- Jake Luhn (UMass Boston)
- Cade Lemcke (Virginia)
- Andy Farrell (Dayton)

Legend

- (C) Team captain
- (S) Suspended
- (I) Ineligible
- (W) Walk-on
- Injured
- Current redshirt

Roster
Last update: 10 December 2014

== Schedule ==
| Date time, TV | Opponent | Result | Record | Site (attendance) city, state |
Regular season
| 11/09/2013*; 1:00 pm | at South Carolina | L 44–82 | 0–1 | Colonial Life Arena (8,536); Columbia, SC |
| 11/12/2013*; 8:00 pm, FSSW+ | at TCU | W 82–79 | 1–1 | Daniel-Meyer Coliseum (4,067); Fort Worth, TX |
| 11/16/2013*; 5:00 pm | Mars Hill | W 88–70 | 2–1 | Willett Hall (1,666); Farmville, VA |
| 11/22/2013*; 7:00 pm | Brown | L 69–81 | 2–2 | Willett Hall (1,522); Farmville, VA |
| 11/24/2013*; 1:00 pm | at Penn State; Barclays Center Classic | L 67–93 | 2–3 | Bryce Jordan Center (4,261); University Park, PA |
| 11/26/2013*; 7:00 pm | at St. John's; Barclays Center Classic | L 47–65 | 2–4 | Carnesecca Arena (3,531); Queens, NY |
| 11/29/2013*; 4:30 pm | vs. North Carolina A&T; Barclays Center Classic | L 78–85 | 2–5 | Multipurpose Activity Center (150); West Long Branch, NJ |
| 11/30/2013*; 4:30 pm | vs. Mississippi Valley State; Barclays Center Classic | L 89–90 | 2–6 | Multipurpose Activity Center (250); West Long Branch, NJ |
| 12/04/2013*; 7:00 pm | West Virginia Tech | W 95–80 | 3–6 | Willett Hall (931); Farmville, VA |
| 12/07/2013*; 4:00 pm | Eastern Kentucky | L 67–76 | 3–7 | Willett Hall (1,456); Farmville, VA |
| 12/14/2013*; 5:00 pm | Bluefield State | W 93–73 | 4–7 | Willett Hall (432); Farmville, VA |
| 12/17/2013*; 7:00 pm | Virginia Intermont | W 80–61 | 5–7 | Willett Hall (429); Farmville, VA |
| 12/21/2013*; 4:00 pm | at Dartmouth | L 64–84 | 5–8 | Leede Arena (652); Hanover, NH |
| 12/30/2013*; 7:00 pm | at Ohio | L 43–78 | 5–9 | Convocation Center (5,242); Athens, OH |
| 01/04/2014*; 5:00 pm | at Louisiana Tech | L 52–126 | 5–10 | Thomas Assembly Center (2,502); Ruston, LA |
| 01/08/2014; 7:00 pm | at VMI | L 72–95 | 5–11 (0–1) | Cameron Hall (653); Lexington, VA |
| 01/11/2014; 5:00 pm | Campbell | L 67–75 | 5–12 (0–2) | Willett Hall (632); Farmville, VA |
| 01/15/2014; 7:00 pm | at High Point | L 75–83 | 5–13 (0–3) | Millis Convocation Center (1,004); High Point, NC |
| 01/18/2014; 4:00 pm | at Radford | L 76–93 | 5–14 (0–4) | Dedmon Center (1,772); Radford, VA |
| 01/22/2014; 7:00 pm | Liberty | W 69–66 | 6–14 (1–4) | Willett Hall (1,619); Farmville, VA |
| 01/25/2014; 5:30 pm | at Charleston Southern | W 88–85 | 7–14 (2–4) | CSU Field House (794); North Charleston, SC |
| 01/29/2014; 7:00 pm | Gardner–Webb | L 62–82 | 7–15 (2–5) | Willett Hall (1,207); Farmville, VA |
| 02/01/2014; 5:00 pm | UNC Asheville | L 66–67 | 7–16 (2–6) | Willett Hall (1,757); Farmville, VA |
| 02/05/2014; 7:00 pm | at Presbyterian | L 62–77 | 7–17 (2–7) | Templeton Physical Education Center (498); Clinton, SC |
| 02/08/2014; 2:00 pm | at Coastal Carolina | L 58–67 | 7–18 (2–8) | HTC Center (2,006); Conway, SC |
| 02/12/2014; 7:00 pm | Winthrop | L 59–76 | 7–19 (2–9) | Willett Hall (901); Farmville, VA |
| 02/15/2014; 7:00 pm | at Campbell | W 76–53 | 8–19 (3–9) | John W. Pope, Jr. Convocation Center (1,930); Buies Creek, NC |
| 02/19/2014; 7:00 pm | Radford | L 75–86 | 8–20 (3–10) | Willett Hall (1,419); Farmville, VA |
| 02/22/2014; 5:00 pm | High Point | L 59–85 | 8–21 (3–11) | Willett Hall (1,372); Farmville, VA |
| 02/25/2014; 7:00 pm | at Liberty | L 76–90 | 8–22 (3–12) | Vines Center (2,072); Lynchburg, VA |
| 03/01/2014; 4:30 pm | VMI | L 66–86 | 8–23 (3–13) | Willett Hall (1,221); Farmville, VA |
Big South tournament
| 03/05/2014; 8:00 pm | at vs. Gardner–Webb; First round | L 65–81 | 8–24 | HTC Center (1,648); Conway, SC |
*Non-conference game. ^{#}Rankings from AP Poll. (#) Tournament seedings in parentheses. All times are in Eastern Time.
