= Jayson Gee =

American men's college basketball coach (born 1965)

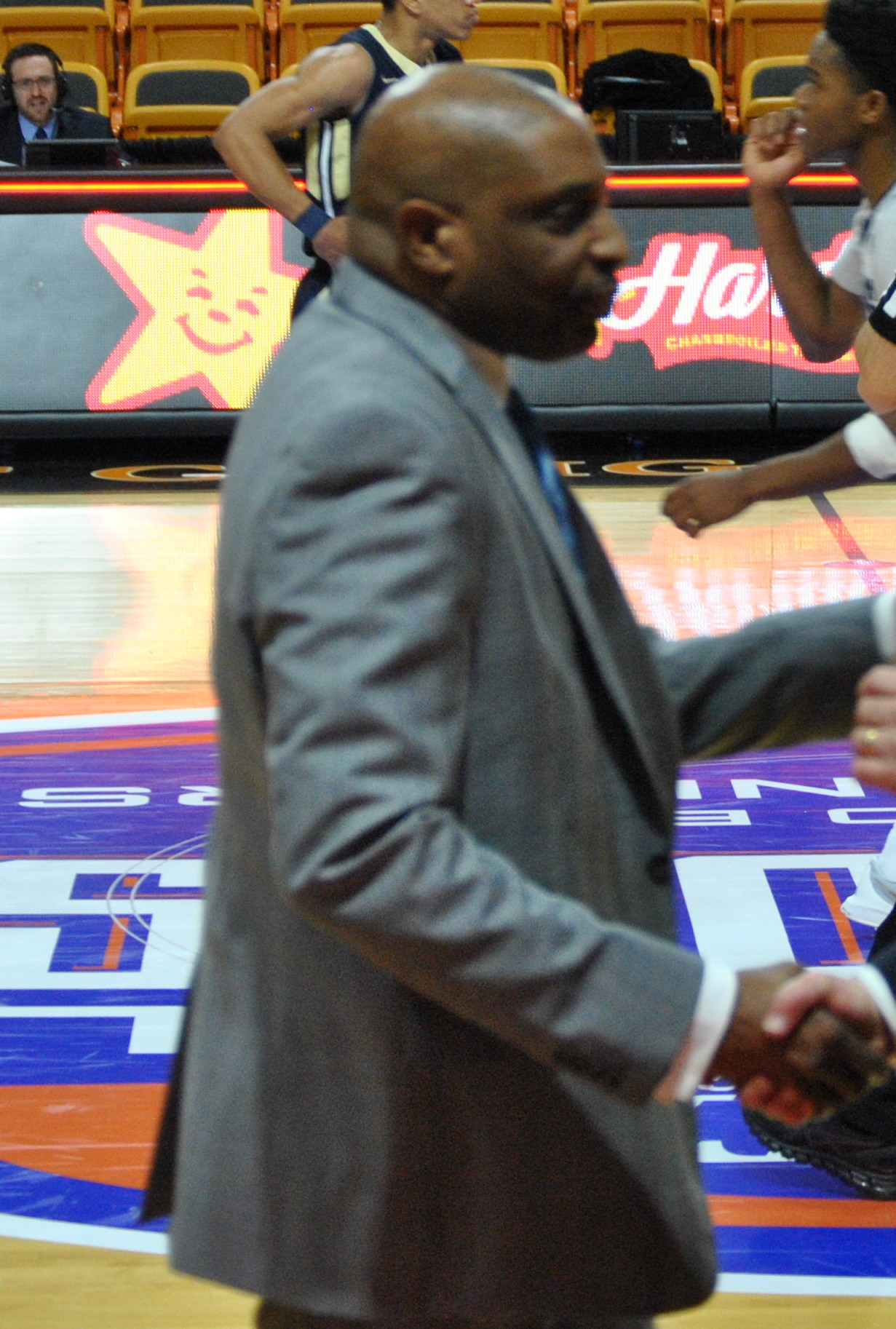

Current position
- Title: Head Coach
- Team: Concord Mountain Lions
- Conference: Mountain East Conference

Biographical details
- Born: December 13, 1965 (age 60); Springfield, Ohio, U.S.
- Education: University of Charleston (1988)

Playing career
- 1984–1988: Charleston

Coaching career (HC unless noted)
- 1989–1993: Youngstown State (assistant)
- 1993–1996: Ohio (assistant/assoc. HC)
- 1996–2003: Charleston
- 2003–2006: St. Bonaventure (assistant/AHC)
- 2006–2013: Cleveland State (AHC)
- 2013–2018: Longwood
- 2018–2019: Winthrop (AHC)
- 2019–2021: Cincinnati (assistant)
- 2021–2024: Western Carolina (AHC)
- 2024-2025: Coastal Carolina (AHC)
- 2025-2026: Kansas State (Staff)
- 2026-present: Concord

Head coaching record
- Overall: 202–173 (.539)

Accomplishments and honors

Championships
- 2× WVIAC Tournament championships (1999, 2001); 2× WVIAC regular season championships (2000, 2001)

Awards
- John Lotz Barnabas Award (2015)

Jayson Gee (born December 13, 1965) is an American men's college basketball coach who is currently the head coach of the Concord Mountain Lions. He was formerly head coach at Longwood University from 2013–2018.

Prior to Longwood, Gee served as head coach of his alma mater, the University of Charleston, and as an assistant coach at several other schools. In 2015, he was awarded the John Lotz Barnabas award by the Fellowship of Christian Athletes.

== Head coaching record ==
Record table
Season	Team	Overall	Conference	Standing	Postseason
Charleston Golden Eagles (WVIAC) (1996–2003)
1996–97	Charleston	15–15	7–12	11th	
1997–98	Charleston	22–6	15–5	3rd	
1998–99	Charleston	26–6	15–4	3rd	NCAA Div II Tournament
1999–00	Charleston	28–2	18–1	1st	NCAA Div II Tournament
2000–01	Charleston	23–7	16–2	1st	NCAA Div II Tournament
2001–02	Charleston	25–7	14–4	4th	NCAA Div II Tournament
2002–03	Charleston	21–10	13–5	4th	
Charleston:		160–53 (.751)	98–33 (.748)		
Longwood Lancers (Big South Conference) (2013–2018)
2013–14	Longwood	8–24	3–13	6th (North)	
2014–15	Longwood	11–23	5–13	9th	
2015–16	Longwood	10–23	5–13	T–8th	
2016–17	Longwood	6–24	3–15	9th	
2017–18	Longwood	7–26	3–15	10th	
Longwood:		42–120 (.259)	19–69 (.216)		
Total:		202–173 (.539)			
National champion Postseason invitational champion Conference regular season champion Conference regular season and conference tournament champion Division regular season champion Division regular season and conference tournament champion Conference tournament champion
