= 2013–14 Ivy League men's basketball season =

- League: NCAA Division I
- Sport: Basketball
- Duration: January 11 – March 11, 2014
- Teams: 8

Regular season
- Champions: Harvard
- Runners-up: Yale
- Season MVP: Wesley Saunders, Harvard

Basketball seasons
- ← 2012–13 2014–15 →

2013–14 Ivy League men's basketball standings
	Conf.				Overall
Team	W		L	PCT	W		L	PCT
x-Harvard	13	–	1	.929	27	–	5	.844
Yale	9	–	5	.643	19	–	14	.576
Princeton	8	–	6	.571	21	–	9	.700
Columbia	8	–	6	.571	21	–	13	.618
Brown	7	–	7	.500	15	–	14	.517
Dartmouth	5	–	9	.357	12	–	16	.429
Penn	5	–	9	.357	8	–	20	.286
Cornell	1	–	13	.071	2	–	26	.071
Rankings from AP Poll x-Ivy League champion

The 2013–14 Ivy League men's basketball season marked the continuation of the annual tradition of competitive basketball among Ivy League members. The tradition began when the league was formed during the 1956–57 season and its history extends to the predecessor Eastern Intercollegiate Basketball League, which was formed in 1902.

Harvard won the regular season title outright and earned the conference's only 2014 NCAA Men's Division I Basketball Tournament bid. Overall, the conference had five postseason participants and won eight postseason games, marking the best postseason in league history.

Wesley Saunders of Harvard was named Ivy League Men's Basketball Player of the Year. James Jones of Yale was named Ivy League Coach of the Year and Spencer Weisz of Princeton was named Ivy League Freshman of the Year. Brown's Cedric Kuakumensah earned his second consecutive Ivy League Defensive Player of the Year recognition.

Saunders was an Associated Press honorable mention NCAA Men's Basketball All-American. On February 20, Matt Townsend of Yale was named a third team Academic All-American selection. Penn's Dau Jok was named to the Allstate Good Works Team by the National Association of Basketball Coaches (NABC) and earned the Most Courageous Award from the United States Basketball Writers Association (USBWA).

The NABC named Saunders, T.J. Bray of Princeton and Justin Sears of Yale to the All-District 13 First Team and Sean McGonagill of Brown and Siyani Chambers of Harvard to its Second Team. The USBWA named Saunders to its All-District I Team.

The All-Ivy teams were as follows:

FIRST TEAM ALL-IVY

- Sean McGonagill, Brown (Sr., G - Brookfield, Ill.)
- Alex Rosenberg, Columbia (Jr., F - Short Hills, N.J.)
- *Wesley Saunders, Harvard (Jr., G/F - Los Angeles)
- *T.J. Bray, Princeton (Sr., G - New Berlin, Wis.)
- Justin Sears, Yale (So., F - Plainfield, N.J.)

*Unanimous

SECOND TEAM ALL-IVY

- Maodo Lo, Columbia (So., G - Berlin)
- Siyani Chambers, Harvard (So., G - Golden Valley, Minn.)
- Steve Moundou-Missi, Harvard (Jr., F - Yaounde, Cameroon)
- Laurent Rivard, Harvard (Sr., G - Saint-Bruno, Quebec, Canada)
- Fran Dougherty, Penn (Sr., F - New Britain, Pa.)

== NCAA tournament ==
Seed	Region	School	First Four	Round of 64	Round of 32	Sweet 16	Elite Eight	Final Four	Championship
12	East	Harvard	n/a	Defeated Cincinnati 61–57	Eliminated by Michigan State 80–73				
		W–L (%):	0–0 –	1–0 1.000	0–1 .000	0–0 –	0–0 –	0–0 –	0–0 –Total: 1–1 .500

== College Basketball Invitational ==
School	First round	Quarterfinals	Semifinals	Finals
Princeton	Defeated Tulane 56–55	Eliminated by Fresno State 56–72		
W–L (%):	1–0 1.000	0–1 .000	0–0 –	0–0 – Total: 1–1 .500

== CollegeInsider.com Postseason Tournament ==
School	First round	Second round	Quarterfinals	Semifinals	Finals
Brown	Eliminated by Holy Cross 65–68				
Columbia	Defeated Valparaiso 58–56	Defeated Eastern Michigan 69–56	Eliminated by Yale 69–72		
Yale	Defeated Quinnipiac 69–68	Defeated Holy Cross 71–56	Defeated Columbia 72–69	Defeated VMI 75–62	Eliminated by Murray State 65–57
W–L (%):	2–1 .667	2–0 1.000	1–1 .500	1–0 1.000	0–1 .000 Total: 6–3 .667
