= 2013–14 Princeton Tigers men's basketball team =

American college basketball season

2013–14 Princeton Tigers men's basketball

CBI Quarterfinals vs. Fresno State, L 56–72
- Conference: Ivy League
- Record: 21–9 (8–6 Ivy)
- Head coach: Mitch Henderson (3rd season)
- Assistant coaches: Brian Earl; Marcus Jenkins; Brett MacConnell
- Home arena: Jadwin Gymnasium

2013–14 Ivy League men's basketball standings
	Conf.				Overall
Team	W		L	PCT	W		L	PCT
x-Harvard	13	–	1	.929	27	–	5	.844
Yale	9	–	5	.643	19	–	14	.576
Princeton	8	–	6	.571	21	–	9	.700
Columbia	8	–	6	.571	21	–	13	.618
Brown	7	–	7	.500	15	–	14	.517
Dartmouth	5	–	9	.357	12	–	16	.429
Penn	5	–	9	.357	8	–	20	.286
Cornell	1	–	13	.071	2	–	26	.071
Rankings from AP Poll x-Ivy League champion

The 2013–14 Princeton Tigers men's basketball team represented Princeton University during the 2013–14 NCAA Division I men's basketball season. The Tigers, led by third-year head coach Mitch Henderson, played their home games at Jadwin Gymnasium and were members of the Ivy League. They finished the season 21–9, 8–6 in Ivy League play to finish in a tie for third place. They were invited to the College Basketball Invitational, where they defeated Tulane in the first round before losing in the quarterfinals to Fresno State.

== Awards and accomplishments ==
Spencer Weisz earned the 2014 Ivy League Men's Basketball Rookie of the Year Award. On December 7, 2013, he posted his first career double-double with 17 points (including 3-for-3 on three-point field goals) and 10 rebounds against Fairleigh Dickinson.

== Roster ==
Number	Name	Position	Height	Weight	Year	Hometown
2	Jimmy Sherburne	Guard	6–3	197	Senior	Whitefish Bay, Wisconsin
3	Clay Wilson	Guard	6–3	170	Junior	Tulsa, Oklahoma
4	Denton Koon	Forward	6–8	210	Junior	Liberty, Missouri
5	T.J. Bray	Guard	6–5	207	Senior	New Berlin, Wisconsin
10	Spencer Weisz	Forward	6–4	180	Freshman	Florham Park, New Jersey
11	Brian Fabrizius	Forward	6–11	203	Junior	Arlington Heights, Illinois
12	Ben Hazel	Guard/forward	6–5	191	Junior	Bowie, Maryland
13	Mike Washington, Jr.	Guard	6–3	190	Sophomore	Oak Harbor, Washington
14	Khyan Rayner	Guard	5–11	165	Freshman	Portland, Oregon
15	Hashim Moore	Forward	6–5	220	Freshman	Fort Lauderdale, Florida
21	Henry Caruso	Forward	6–4	190	Freshman	San Mateo, California
22	Chris Clement	Guard	6–2	190	Senior	Round Rock, Texas
24	Will Barrett	Forward	6–10	197	Senior	Hartsville, Pennsylvania
25	Steven Cook	Forward	6–5	185	Freshman	Winnetka, Illinois
30	Hans Brase	Forward	6–8	231	Sophomore	Clover, South Carolina
31	Pete Miller	Forward	6–10	225	Freshman	Northfield, Massachusetts
32	Daniel Edwards	Forward	6–8	225	Junior	Dallas, Texas
33	Edo Lawrence	Center	7–1	220	Sophomore	London, England
40	Bobby Garbade	Center	6–11	234	Junior	Binghamton, New York

== Schedule ==
Date time, TV	Opponent	Result	Record	Site (attendance) city, state
Regular season
11/10/2013*; 1:00 pm	Florida A&M	W 67–50	1–0	Jadwin Gymnasium (1,511); Princeton, New Jersey
11/16/2013*; 8:00 pm, FS2	at Butler	L 67–70	1–1	Hinkle Fieldhouse (7,471); Indianapolis
11/20/2013*; 7:00 pm	Lafayette	W 81–80 ^{OT}	2–1	Jadwin Gymnasium (1,403); Princeton, New Jersey
11/23/2013*; 3:00 pm	at Rice	W 70–56	3–1	Tudor Fieldhouse (1,628); Houston, Texas
11/26/2013*; 8:00 pm	George Mason	W 71–66	4–1	Jadwin Gymnasium (1,672); Princeton, New Jersey
11/30/2013*; 7:00 pm	at Bucknell	W 66–53	5–1	Sojka Pavilion (3,011); Lewisburg, Pennsylvania
12/07/2013*; 7:00 pm	Fairleigh Dickinson	W 77–55	6–1	Jadwin Gymnasium (1,952); Princeton, New Jersey
12/11/2013*; 7:30 pm, ESPN3	at Rutgers; Rivalry	W 78–73	7–1	The RAC (4,255); Piscataway, New Jersey
12/14/2013*; 2:00 pm, BTN	at Penn State	W 81–79 ^{OT}	8–1	Rec Hall (6,188); University Park, Pennsylvania
12/20/2013*; 10:30 pm	vs. Pacific; South Point Holiday Hoops Classic	W 83–58	9–1	South Point Arena (N/A); Enterprise, Nevada
12/21/2013*; 11:00 pm	vs. Portland; South Point Holiday Hoops Classic	L 79–93	9–2	South Point Arena (316); Enterprise, Nevada
12/31/2013*; 12:00 pm	Kent State	W 73–68	10–2	Jadwin Gymnasium (2,440); Princeton, New Jersey
01/04/2014*; 2:00 pm, ESPN3	at Liberty	W 80–74	11–2	Vines Center (1,484); Lynchburg, Virginia
01/11/2014; 6:00 pm, NBCSN	at Penn	L 74–77	11–3 (0–1)	Palestra (6,322); Philadelphia
01/26/2014*; 2:00 pm	Kean	W 84–54	12–3	Jadwin Gymnasium (2,440); Princeton, New Jersey
01/31/2014; 7:00 pm	at Harvard	L 76–82	12–4 (0–2)	Lavietes Pavilion (2,195); Cambridge, Massachusetts
02/01/2014; 7:00 pm	at Dartmouth	L 69–78	12–5 (0–3)	Leede Arena (787); Hanover, New Hampshire
02/07/2014; 7:00 pm	Columbia	L 52–53	12–6 (0–4)	Jadwin Gymnasium (1,864); Princeton, New Jersey
02/08/2014; 6:00 pm	Cornell	W 69–48	13–6 (1–4)	Jadwin Gymnasium (2,964); Princeton, New Jersey
02/14/2014; 7:00 pm	at Brown	W 69–65	14–6 (2–4)	Pizzitola Sports Center (906); Providence, Rhode Island
02/15/2014; 7:00 pm	at Yale	L 65–66 ^{OT}	14–7 (2–5)	John J. Lee Amphitheater (1,644); New Haven, Connecticut
02/21/2014; 7:00 pm	Dartmouth	W 67–57	15–7 (3–5)	Jadwin Gymnasium (2,024); Princeton, New Jersey
02/22/2014; 8:00 pm, ESPN3	Harvard	L 47–59	15–8 (3–6)	Jadwin Gymnasium (4,306); Princeton, New Jersey
02/28/2014; 7:00 pm	Yale	W 57–46	16–8 (4–6)	Jadwin Gymnasium (2,730); Princeton, New Jersey
03/01/2014; 6:00 pm	Brown	W 69–64	17–8 (5–6)	Jadwin Gymansium (N/A); Princeton, New Jersey
03/07/2014; 6:00 pm	at Cornell	W 91–51	18–8 (6–6)	Newman Arena (1,017); Ithaca, New York
03/08/2014; 7:00 pm	Columbia	W 74–64	19–8 (7–6)	Levien Gymnasium (2,452); New York City
03/11/2014; 8:00 pm	Penn	W 70–65	20–8 (8–6)	Jadwin Gymnasium (2,273); Princeton, New Jersey
College Basketball Invitational
03/19/2014*; 8:00 pm	at Tulane; First round	W 56–55	21–8	Devlin Fieldhouse (670); New Orleans
03/24/2014*; 10:00 pm	at Fresno State; Quarterfinals	L 56–72	21–9	Save Mart Center (3,637); Fresno, California
*Non-conference game. (#) Tournament seedings in parentheses. All times are in Eastern Time.
