= 2013–14 Dartmouth Big Green men's basketball team =

American college basketball season

2013–14 Dartmouth Big Green men's basketball
- Conference: Ivy League
- Record: 12–16 (5–9 Ivy)
- Head coach: Paul Cormier (4th season)
- Assistant coaches: Jean Bain; Jordan Watson; Chris Cormier
- Home arena: Leede Arena

2013–14 Ivy League men's basketball standings
	Conf.				Overall
Team	W		L	PCT	W		L	PCT
x-Harvard	13	–	1	.929	27	–	5	.844
Yale	9	–	5	.643	19	–	14	.576
Princeton	8	–	6	.571	21	–	9	.700
Columbia	8	–	6	.571	21	–	13	.618
Brown	7	–	7	.500	15	–	14	.517
Dartmouth	5	–	9	.357	12	–	16	.429
Penn	5	–	9	.357	8	–	20	.286
Cornell	1	–	13	.071	2	–	26	.071
Rankings from AP Poll x-Ivy League champion

The 2013–14 Dartmouth Big Green men's basketball team represented Dartmouth College during the 2013–14 NCAA Division I men's basketball season. The Big Green, led by fourth year head coach Paul Cormier, played their home games at Leede Arena and were members of the Ivy League.

They finished the season 12–16, 5–9 in Ivy League play to finish in a tie for sixth place.

== Roster ==
Number	Name	Position	Height	Weight	Year	Hometown
0	Tommy Carpenter	Forward	6–7	200	Sophomore	Greensboro, North Carolina
1	Tyler Melville	Guard	6–2	180	Senior	Plano, Texas
2	Ikemefuna Ngwudo	Forward	6–6	200	Freshman	Baldwin, New York
3	Connor Boehm	Forward	6–7	235	Sophomore	Winnetka, Illinois
4	Mike Fleming	Guard	6–0	175	Freshman	Lake Forest, Illinois
5	Matt Rennie	Forward	6–8	220	Sophomore	North Brunswick, New Jersey
10	Malik Gill	Guard	5–9	185	Sophomore	New Rochelle, New York
11	Alex Mitola	Guard	5–11	165	Sophomore	Florham Park, New Jersey
12	Gabas Maldunas	Forward/Center	6–9	225	Junior	Panevėžys, Lithuania
15	Kevin Crescenzi	Guard	6–3	190	Sophomore	North Palm Beach, Florida
21	Wesley Dickinson	Forward	6–7	220	Freshman	Bergenfield, New Jersey
22	Kirill Savolainen	Guard/Forward	6–5	195	Junior	Vantaa, Finland
23	John Golden	Forward	6–6	200	Junior	Freehold Township, New Jersey
25	Brandon McDonnell	Forward	6–8	210	Sophomore	Jackson, New Jersey
33	Eli Harrison	Forward	6–6	185	Freshman	Sisters, Oregon
44	Cole Harrison	Center	6–10	235	Freshman	Brentwood, Tennessee

== Schedule ==
Date time, TV	Opponent	Result	Record	Site (attendance) city, state
Regular season
11/10/2013*; 2:00 pm	Lyndon State	W 106–61	1–0	Leede Arena (718); Hanover, NH
11/13/2013*; 7:00 pm	Bryant	L 77–87	1–1	Leede Arena (648); Hanover, NH
11/16/2013*; 4:00 pm	UMass Lowell	W 77–59	2–1	Leede Arena (713); Hanover, NH
12/01/2013*; 7:00 pm	at Maine	W 81–56	3–1	Cross Insurance Center (1,009); Bangor, ME
12/05/2013*; 8:00 pm	at Northern Illinois	L 57–64	3–2	Convocation Center (625); DeKalb, IL
12/07/2013*; 8:00 pm	at IPFW	L 64–80	3–3	Hilliard Gates Sports Center (2,175); Fort Wayne, IN
12/10/2013*; 8:00 pm	at Illinois	L 65–72	3–4	State Farm Center (14,651); Champaign, IL
12/14/2013*; 4:00 pm	Jacksonville State	W 76–46	4–4	Leede Arena (503); Hanover, NH
12/18/2013*; 7:00 pm	at New Hampshire; Rivalry	W 62–48	5–4	Lundholm Gym (454); Durham, NH
12/21/2013*; 4:00 pm	Longwood	W 84–64	6–4	Leede Arena (652); Hanover, NH
12/31/2013*; 2:00 pm	Lesley	W 85–47	7–4	Leede Arena (823); Hanover, NH
01/04/2014*; 2:00 pm	Vermont	L 53–62	7–5	Leede Arena (1,407); Hanover, NH
01/07/2014*; 7:00 pm	Hartford	L 56–68	7–6	Leede Arena (523); Hanover, NH
01/11/2014; 7:00 pm	at Harvard	L 45–61	7–7 (0–1)	Lavietes Pavilion (1,766); Cambridge, MA
01/18/2014*; 6:00 pm, FS1	at St. John's	L 55–69	7–8	Carnesecca Arena (5,505); Queens, NY
01/26/2014; 4:00 pm, NBCSN	Harvard	L 50–80	7–9 (0–2)	Leede Arena (1,544); Hanover, NH
01/31/2014; 7:00 pm	Penn	W 67–58	8–9 (1–2)	Leede Arena (802); Hanover, NH
02/01/2014; 7:00 pm	Princeton	W 78–69	9–9 (2–2)	Leede Arena (787); Hanover, NH
02/07/2014; 7:00 pm	Yale	L 54–67	9–10 (2–3)	Leede Arena (722); Hanover, NH
02/08/2014; 7:00 pm	Brown	L 62–75	9–11 (2–4)	Leede Arena (836); Hanover, NH
02/14/2014; 7:00 pm	at Cornell	L 67–70	9–12 (2–5)	Newman Arena (1,411); Ithaca, NY
02/15/2014; 7:00 pm	at Columbia	L 59–69	9–13 (2–6)	Levien Gymnasium (1,916); New York City, NY
02/21/2014; 7:00 pm	at Princeton	L 57–67	9–14 (2–7)	Jadwin Gymnasium (2,024); Princeton, NJ
02/22/2014; 7:00 pm	at Penn	L 65–74	9–15 (2–8)	Palestra (3,646); Philadelphia, PA
02/28/2014; 7:00 pm	Columbia	L 72-84	9–16 (2–9)	Leede Arena (680); Hanover, NH
03/01/2014; 7:00 pm	Cornell	W 87-78	10–16 (3–9)	Leede Arena (757); Hanover, NH
03/07/2014; 7:00 pm	at Brown	W 75-68	11–16 (4–9)	Pizzitola Sports Center (912); Providence, RI
03/08/2014; 7:00 pm	at Yale	W 69-61	12–16 (5–9)	Payne Whitney Gymnasium (1,134); New Haven, CT
*Non-conference game. ^{#}Rankings from AP Poll. (#) Tournament seedings in parentheses. All times are in Eastern Time.
