= Middleburg Academy =

Location
- 35321 Notre Dame Lane; Middleburg, (Loudoun County), Virginia 20117; United States; 38°59′20″N 77°47′7″W

Information
- Type: Private Independent Secondary School, Coeducational
- Motto: "Learn, Lead, Serve"
- Status: closed
- Closed: 2020
- Head of School: (Vacant)
- Faculty: 19.6
- Grades: 8-12
- Campus size: 95 acres (38 ha)
- Colors: Blue and Gold
- Nickname: Dragons
- Team name: Dragons
- Accreditation: Virginia Association of Independent Schools, National Association of Independent Schools, Southern Association of Colleges and Schools
- Dean of Students: Zachary Rogers (Acting)
- Athletic Director: Lauren Will
- Website: www.middleburgacademy.org

Middleburg Academy (formerly Notre Dame Academy, a girl's Catholic boarding school, until it became co-educational in the 1990s, it then became a day school with an enrollment of approximately 150, until it was purchased by Middleburg Academy) was a co-educational, nonsectarian, independent secondary school, set on a historic campus of more than 95 acres (38 ha) in Middleburg, Virginia. On June 17, 2020, Middleburg Academy announced its full closure.

== Background ==
Middleburg Academy was founded in 1965. Originally a girls’ boarding school, in 1990 it became a co-educational day school. In 2000, the school was purchased by the Board of Trustees and in 2009 became a fully independent, nonsectarian school. It closed in June 2020.

== Education and extracurriculars ==
The school was open to students of all faiths who were seeking an independent, co-educational, college preparatory high school in the Northern Virginia area. Of the twenty-seven full-time members of faculty, seventeen held one or more advanced degrees, with five holding PhDs. Advanced Placement (AP) courses were offered in all academic disciplines.

Students participated in a variety of clubs and organizations, such as Green Club, Spirit Club, Yearbook, Student Council, and the Varsity Club. All students were required to have been accepted into one four-year accredited college, pass all classes in their senior year, and fulfill an annual mandatory twenty-five hour community service prerequisite in order to graduate.

Each student was assigned to an Advisory group, which was a group of ten to twelve students and one faculty member which met twice a week. The faculty member acted as a liaison to parents for information about upcoming school activities and as a first point of contact when students needed guidance.

== Athletics ==
More than 90% of Middleburg Academy Students participated in athletics. The school offered a variety of athletics, including basketball, field hockey, soccer, lacrosse, cross-country, baseball, golf, volleyball, swimming, and tennis teams. There was a no-cut sports policy, allowing for all of the students to be a member of a sports team.
