= VMI Keydets basketball statistical leaders =

The VMI Keydets men's basketball statistical leaders are individual statistical leaders of the VMI Keydets men's basketball program in various categories, including points, assists, blocks, rebounds, and steals. Within those areas, the lists identify single-game, single-season, and career leaders. The Keydets represent Virginia Military Institute in the NCAA's Southern Conference.

VMI began competing in intercollegiate basketball in 1908. However, the school's record book does not generally list records from before the 1950s, as records from before this period are often incomplete and inconsistent. Since scoring was much lower in this era, and teams played much fewer games during a typical season, it is likely that few or no players from this era would appear on these lists anyway.

The NCAA did not officially record assists as a stat until the 1983–84 season, and blocks and steals until the 1985–86 season, but VMI's record books includes players in these stats before these seasons. These lists are updated through the end of the 2023–24 season.

== Scoring ==
Career
| Rk | Player | Points | Seasons |
|---|---|---|---|
| 1 | Reggie Williams | 2,556 | 2004–05 2005–06 2006–07 2007–08 |
| 2 | Gay Elmore | 2,422 | 1983–84 1984–85 1985–86 1986–87 |
| 3 | Ron Carter | 2,228 | 1974–75 1975–76 1976–77 1977–78 |
| 4 | QJ Peterson | 2,200 | 2013–14 2014–15 2015–16 2016–17 |
| 5 | Stan Okoye | 2,146 | 2009–10 2010–11 2011–12 2012–13 |
| 6 | Chavis Holmes | 2,065 | 2005–06 2006–07 2007–08 2008–09 |
| 7 | Keith Gabriel | 1,925 | 2008–09 2009–10 2010–11 2011–12 |
| 8 | Austin Kenon | 1,767 | 2007–08 2008–09 2009–10 2010–11 |
| 9 | Travis Holmes | 1,733 | 2005–06 2006–07 2007–08 2008–09 |
| 10 | Ramon Williams | 1,630 | 1986–87 1987–88 1988–89 1989–90 |

Season
| Rk | Player | Points | Season |
|---|---|---|---|
| 1 | Reggie Williams | 928 | 2006–07 |
| 2 | Jason Conley | 820 | 2001–02 |
| 3 | Ron Carter | 736 | 1977–78 |
| 4 | Gay Elmore | 713 | 1986–87 |
| 5 | D. J. Covington | 704 | 2013–14 |
| 6 | Bubba Parham | 686 | 2018–19 |
| 7 | Chavis Holmes | 681 | 2008–09 |
| 8 | Stan Okoye | 666 | 2012–13 |
| 9 | QJ Peterson | 664 | 2013–14 |
| 10 | Rodney Glasgow | 660 | 2013–14 |

Single game
| Rk | Player | Points | Season | Opponent |
|---|---|---|---|---|
| 1 | QJ Peterson | 46 | 2015–16 | Mercer |
| 2 | Reggie Williams | 45 | 2006–07 | Virginia Intermont |
| 3 | Reggie Williams | 43 | 2007–08 | Southern Virginia |
| | Reggie Williams | 43 | 2007–08 | Apprentice |
| | Julian Eleby | 43 | 2014–15 | Western Carolina |
| 6 | Jason Conley | 42 | 2001–02 | Western Carolina |
| | Ron Carter | 42 | 1977–78 | Long Beach State |
| 8 | Bubba Parham | 41 | 2018–19 | W. Carolina |
| | D. J. Covington | 41 | 2013–14 | IPFW |
| | Reggie Williams | 41 | 2006–07 | Cornell |
| | Norm Halberstadt | 41 | 1960–61 | Richmond |

== Rebounds ==
Career
| Rk | Player | Rebounds | Seasons |
|---|---|---|---|
| 1 | Dave Montgomery | 1,068 | 1974–75 1975–76 1976–77 1977–78 |
| 2 | Stan Okoye | 962 | 2009–10 2010–11 2011–12 2012–13 |
| 3 | Bill Ralph | 919 | 1951–52 1952–53 1953–54 |
| 4 | Eric Mann | 841 | 1996–97 1997–98 1998–99 1999–00 2000–01 |
| 5 | Reggie Williams | 820 | 2004–05 2005–06 2006–07 2007–08 |
| 6 | Ron Carter | 809 | 1974–75 1975–76 1976–77 1977–78 |
| 7 | Karl Klinar | 760 | 1951–52 1952–53 1953–54 |
| 8 | D. J. Covington | 747 | 2010–11 2011–12 2012–13 2013–14 |
| 9 | Jake Stephens | 726 | 2018–19 2019–20 2020–21 2021–22 |
| 10 | Charlie Schmaus | 715 | 1963–64 1964–65 1965–66 |

Season
| Rk | Player | Rebounds | Season |
|---|---|---|---|
| 1 | Bill Ralph | 330 | 1953–54 |
| 2 | D. J. Covington | 326 | 2013–14 |
| 3 | Taeshaud Jackson | 321 | 2023–24 |
| 4 | Steve Powers | 318 | 1966–67 |
| 5 | Bobby Williamson | 316 | 1954–55 |
| 6 | Eric Mann | 294 | 2000–01 |
| 7 | Stan Okoye | 290 | 2012–13 |
| 8 | Steve Powers | 285 | 1967–68 |
| 9 | Dave Montgomery | 269 | 1974–75 |
| 10 | Dave Montgomery | 267 | 1976–77 |
| | Dave Montgomery | 267 | 1977–78 |

Single game
| Rk | Player | Rebounds | Season | Opponent |
|---|---|---|---|---|
| 1 | Bill Ralph | 31 | 1953–54 | Hampden-Sydney |
| 2 | Steve Powers | 28 | 1966–67 | Davidson |
| | Bobby Williamson | 28 | 1954–55 | Lynchburg |
| 4 | Karl Klinar | 27 | 1952–53 | Hampden-Sydney |
| 5 | Steve Powers | 26 | 1966–67 | George Washington |
| 6 | Charlie Schmaus | 25 | 1965–66 | The Citadel |
| 7 | Steve Powers | 24 | 1967–68 | East Carolina |
| 8 | Chuck Cotton | 23 | 1956–57 | Presbyterian |
| | Chuck Cotton | 23 | 1957–58 | Roanoke |
| 10 | Dave Montgomery | 22 | 1974–75 | The Citadel |
| | Steve Powers | 22 | 1967–68 | George Washington |

== Assists ==
Career
| Rk | Player | Assists | Seasons |
|---|---|---|---|
| 1 | Richard Little | 608 | 2000–01 2001–02 2002–03 2003–04 |
| 2 | Rodney Glasgow | 530 | 2010–11 2011–12 2012–13 2013–14 |
| 3 | Mike Huffman | 480 | 1982–83 1983–84 1984–85 1985–86 |
| 4 | Bobby Prince | 452 | 1992–93 1993–94 1994–95 1995–96 |
| 5 | Percy Covington | 432 | 1988–89 1989–90 1990–91 1991–92 |
| 6 | Kelly Lombard | 383 | 1975–76 1976–77 1977–78 1978–79 |
| 7 | Ron Burks | 382 | 2008–09 2009–10 2010–11 2011–12 |
| 8 | Reggie Williams | 368 | 2004–05 2005–06 2006–07 2007–08 |
| 9 | Travis Holmes | 360 | 2005–06 2006–07 2007–08 2008–09 |
| 10 | Darryl Faulkner | 333 | 1993–94 1996–97 1997–98 |

Season
| Rk | Player | Assists | Season |
|---|---|---|---|
| 1 | Richard Little | 216 | 2002–03 |
| 2 | Rodney Glasgow | 205 | 2013–14 |
| 3 | Bobby Prince | 173 | 1994–95 |
| 4 | Richard Little | 165 | 2003–04 |
| 5 | Mike Huffman | 164 | 1984–85 |
| 6 | Bobby Prince | 156 | 1995–96 |
| 7 | Percy Covington | 152 | 1989–90 |
| 8 | Reggie Williams | 146 | 2006–07 |
| | Tan Yildizoglu | 146 | 2025–26 |
| 10 | Darryl Faulkner | 134 | 1997–98 |

Single game
| Rk | Player | Assists | Season | Opponent |
|---|---|---|---|---|
| 1 | Tan Yildizoglu | 15 | 2024–25 | Washington College (MD) |
| 2 | Bobby Prince | 14 | 1994–95 | Western Carolina |
| 3 | Ron Burks | 13 | 2009–10 | Lynchburg |
| | Richard Little | 13 | 2003–04 | High Point |
| | Richard Little | 13 | 2003–04 | James Madison |
| | Richard Little | 13 | 2002–03 | Chattanooga |
| 7 | Rodney Glasgow | 12 | 2013–14 | Gardner-Webb |
| | Reggie Williams | 12 | 2006–07 | Charleston Southern |
| | Richard Little | 12 | 2002–03 | Liberty |
| | Mike Huffman | 12 | 1984–85 | Hampden-Sydney |

== Steals ==
Career
| Rk | Player | Steals | Seasons |
|---|---|---|---|
| 1 | Travis Holmes | 309 | 2005–06 2006–07 2007–08 2008–09 |
| 2 | Chavis Holmes | 304 | 2005–06 2006–07 2007–08 2008–09 |
| 3 | Jason Bell | 240 | 1994–95 1995–96 1996–97 1997–98 1998–99 |
| 4 | Keith Gabriel | 212 | 2008–09 2009–10 2010–11 2011–12 |
| 5 | Percy Covington | 196 | 1988–89 1989–90 1990–91 1991–92 |
| 6 | Aaron Demory | 180 | 1996–97 1997–98 1998–99 1999–00 |
| 7 | QJ Peterson | 177 | 2013–14 2014–15 2015–16 2016–17 |
| 8 | Reggie Williams | 175 | 2004–05 2005–06 2006–07 2007–08 |
| 9 | Ron Burks | 170 | 2008–09 2009–10 2010–11 2011–12 |
| 10 | Willie Bell | 169 | 2005–06 2006–07 2007–08 2008–09 |

Season
| Rk | Player | Steals | Season |
|---|---|---|---|
| 1 | Travis Holmes | 111 | 2006–07 |
| 2 | Chavis Holmes | 105 | 2008–09 |
| 3 | Chavis Holmes | 90 | 2006–07 |
| 4 | Travis Holmes | 87 | 2008–09 |
| 5 | Jason Conley | 82 | 2001–02 |
| 6 | Jason Bell | 79 | 1997–98 |
| 7 | Willie Bell | 78 | 2008–09 |
| 8 | Jason Bell | 77 | 1998–99 |
| 9 | Chavis Holmes | 70 | 2007–08 |
| 10 | Bobby Prince | 65 | 1994–95 |

Single game
| Rk | Player | Steals | Season | Opponent |
|---|---|---|---|---|
| 1 | Travis Holmes | 11 | 2006–07 | Bridgewater |
| 2 | Jason Bell | 10 | 1997–98 | Furman |
| 3 | Chavis Holmes | 9 | 2006–07 | Bridgewater |
| 4 | Keith Gabriel | 8 | 2008–09 | High Point |
| | Chavis Holmes | 8 | 2008–09 | Maryland Bible |
| | Travis Holmes | 8 | 2007–08 | William & Mary |
| | Travis Holmes | 8 | 2006–07 | Charleston Southern |
| | Jason Conley | 8 | 2001–02 | Charleston Southern |
| | Jason Bell | 8 | 1998–99 | UNCG |
| | Jason Bell | 8 | 1994–95 | William & Mary |

== Blocks ==
Career
| Rk | Player | Blocks | Seasons |
|---|---|---|---|
| 1 | D. J. Covington | 272 | 2010–11 2011–12 2012–13 2013–14 |
| 2 | Lewis Preston | 202 | 1990–91 1991–92 1992–93 |
| 3 | Phillip Anglade | 194 | 2012–13 2013–14 2014–15 2015–16 |
| 4 | Eric Mann | 184 | 1996–97 1997–98 1998–99 1999–00 2000–01 |
| 5 | Jake Stephens | 150 | 2018–19 2019–20 2020–21 2021–22 |
| 6 | Tim Allmond | 110 | 2001–02 2002–03 2003–04 2004–05 |
| 7 | Mike Herndon | 103 | 1981–82 1982–83 1983–84 1984–85 |
| | Stan Okoye | 103 | 2009–10 2010–11 2011–12 2012–13 |
| 9 | Keith Gabriel | 99 | 2008–09 2009–10 2010–11 2011–12 |
| 10 | Matt Murrer | 89 | 2003–04 2004–05 2005–06 2006–07 |

Season
| Rk | Player | Blocks | Season |
|---|---|---|---|
| 1 | D. J. Covington | 106 | 2013–14 |
| 2 | D. J. Covington | 93 | 2012–13 |
| 3 | Phillip Anglade | 87 | 2014–15 |
| 4 | Lewis Preston | 65 | 1991–92 |
| 5 | Lewis Preston | 64 | 1990–91 |
| 6 | Jake Stephens | 59 | 2021–22 |
| 7 | Matt Murrer | 58 | 2006–07 |
| | Eric Mann | 58 | 2000–01 |
| 9 | D. J. Covington | 57 | 2010–11 |
| 10 | Eric Mann | 51 | 1999–00 |

Single game
| Rk | Player | Blocks | Season | Opponent |
|---|---|---|---|---|
| 1 | Eric Mann | 9 | 1999–00 | The Citadel |
| 2 | D. J. Covington | 9 | 2010–11 | Southern Virginia |
| 3 | Phillip Anglade | 8 | 2013–14 | Va.-Lynchburg |
| 4 | Lewis Preston | 7 | 1991–92 | Marshall |
| | D. J. Covington | 7 | 2012–13 | Old Dominion |
| | D. J. Covington | 7 | 2012–13 | Liberty |
| | D. J. Covington | 7 | 2013–14 | Bluefield State |
| | D. J. Covington | 7 | 2013–14 | Bridgewater |
| | Phillip Anglade | 7 | 2014–15 | Wofford |
| | Fred Iruafemi | 7 | 2015–16 | Chattanooga |
