= Duggar Baucom =

American basketball player-coach

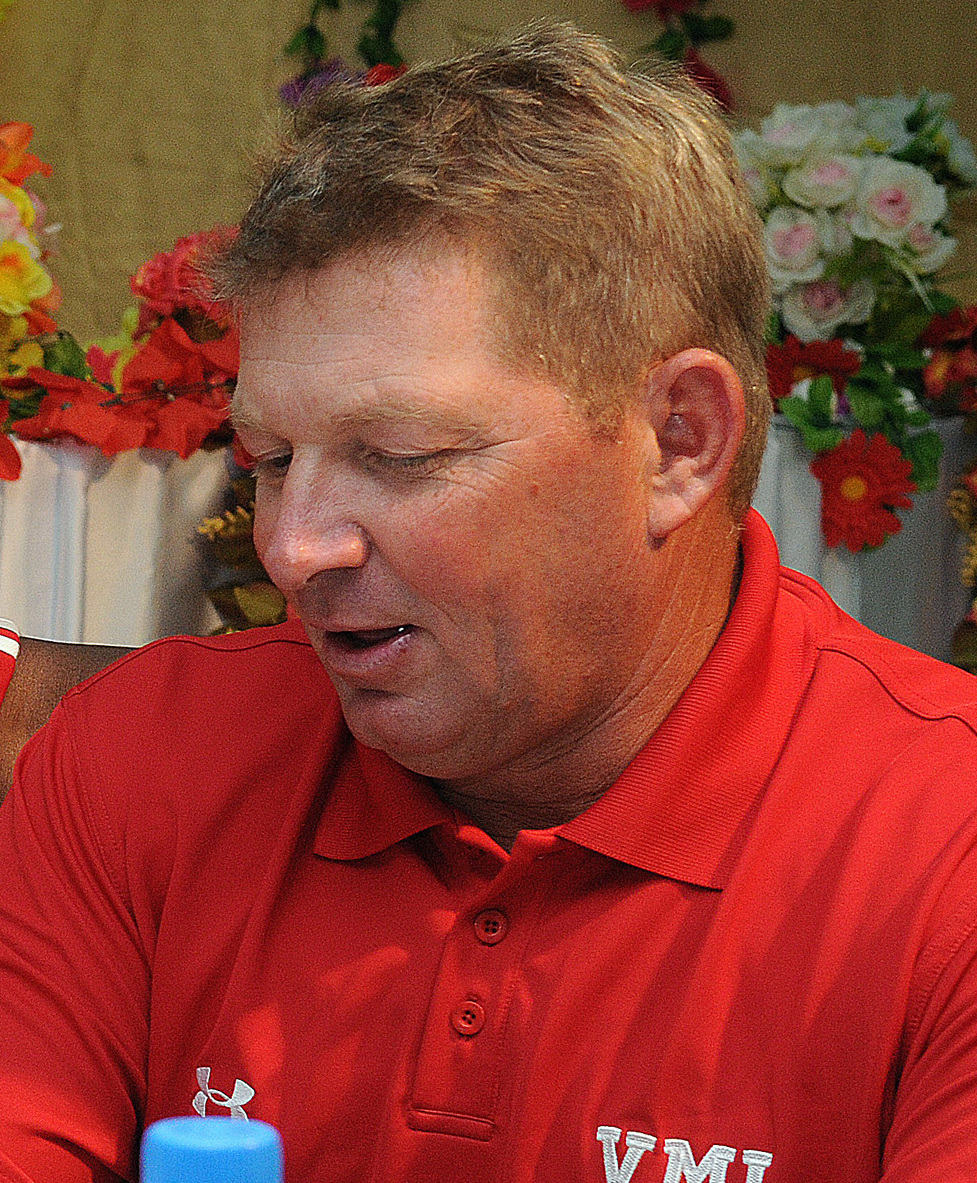
- Baucom in 2009

Biographical details
- Born: September 21, 1960 (age 66)
- Education: UNC Charlotte

Coaching career (HC unless noted)
- 1991–1995: North Mecklenburg HS (NC)
- 1995–1996: Davidson (assistant)
- 1996–1998: Mars Hill (assistant)
- 1998–1999: Northwestern State (assistant)
- 2000–2003: Western Carolina (assistant)
- 2003–2005: Tusculum
- 2005–2015: VMI
- 2015–2022: The Citadel

Head coaching record
- Overall: 262–308 (college)
- Tournaments: 0–1 (NCAA Division II); 3–1 (CIT)

Accomplishments and honors

Championships
- SAC regular season (2004); SAC tournament (2005)

Awards
- SAC Coach of the Year (2004)

Robert Franklin "Duggar" Baucom (born September 21, 1960) is an American college basketball coach, most recently the head men's basketball coach at The Citadel. Baucom was hired as the Citadel's head coach following the 2014–15 season. He was previously the head coach at Virginia Military Institute. He's also served as a coach at Tusculum, Davidson, Western Carolina and Northwestern State.

At the conclusion of the 2017–18 season, Baucom's career record is 184–223 in Division I and 37–19 in Division II.

== Early life ==
Baucom was born on September 21, 1960, and grew up around Charlotte, North Carolina. He attended North Mecklenburg High School in Huntersville where he played basketball. Following graduation, Baucom took a career in law enforcement and worked as a policeman and North Carolina state trooper. He was initially assigned to North Mecklenburg as a school resource officer in 1987, and also coached the school's junior varsity basketball team. After four years, he was promoted to varsity head coach.

Baucom's career in law enforcement was short-lived. On Christmas Day of 1990, Baucom had a heart attack, which was discovered to be a case of hypertrophic cardiomyopathy, a disease in which heart muscle thickens for no apparent reason. Narrowly avoiding death, Baucom was forced to pursue a low-stress occupation. He enrolled at UNC Charlotte where he earned a B.A. in history and graduated in 1995.

== Coaching career ==
Following his time at North Mecklenburg, Baucom first joined the collegiate ranks in 1995 as an assistant to the Davidson Wildcats. In his lone year at Davidson, the Wildcats went 25–5, 14–0 in the Southern Conference, and won the league's regular season championship while participating in the National Invitation Tournament. After spending two seasons as an assistant at Division II Mars Hill, where he was a scout and recruiting coordinator, Baucom served the same role for one year at Northwestern State in Natchitoches, Louisiana.

=== Tusculum ===
Baucom then returned to the Southern Conference where he worked three seasons under head coach Steve Shurina at Western Carolina. His first head coaching job came in 2003 when he was hired by Tusculum College in the Tennessee town of the same name. Baucom immediately made an impression; his first year in 2003–04, he led the Pioneers to a 19–8 season en route to a South Atlantic Conference championship. For this, Baucom was named the SAC Coach of the Year. The next season produced similar results, and Tusculum advanced to the regional quarterfinals of the NCAA tournament. The team led their conference in scoring, field goal percentage, free-throw percentage, three-pointers made per game, and assists per game.

=== VMI ===
Baucom was then hired in the summer of 2005 by the Virginia Military Institute and athletic director Donny White. The first VMI team under Baucom performed poorly. The Keydets went 7–20 and 2–14 in the Big South Conference, failing to qualify for the league tournament. In addition to the struggles on the court, Baucom's heart problems returned, as his previously installed pacemaker had calcified, rendering it difficult to remove and leading to infections and clotting. It was ultimately replaced with a defibrillator, but Baucom would end up missing twelve games on the season during four months of procedures.

Shortly before the start of the 2006–07 season, the team's troubles continued. Two players were found guilty of committing honor violations and promptly expelled from the school, leaving VMI with no players taller than 6 feet 7 inches (2.01 m). To counter this, Baucom installed a fast-pace, high-scoring offense that was a mixture of the 1980s Loyola Marymount teams and Grinnell College, among others. Dubbed the "sprint and strike" and "loot and shoot", by the end of the year, VMI set NCAA records for three-pointers attempted (1,338), three-pointers made (442) and steals (450) that still stand today. The Keydets averaged over 101 points per game and shattered 75 school records. The method proved to increase success as well, as the Keydets went 14–19, the most wins in a season in nine years, and made an upset run through the Big South tournament, defeating Liberty and High Point. They ultimately fell to a 29–5 Winthrop team that went undefeated in conference play by a score of 83–80.

The following year, VMI went 14–15 and lost in the conference quarterfinals, which marked the end of forward Reggie Williams' career. Williams led the NCAA in scoring that year and the year prior, and ended his VMI career as the school's all-time leading scorer with 2,556 points.

Despite the loss of Williams, 2008–09 was the most successful year in Baucom's tenure. In the first game of the season, the Keydets upset the Kentucky Wildcats in Rupp Arena, 111–103. Led by senior twins Chavis and Travis Holmes, the new system was starting to pay dividends, and after a 4–2 start following a 28-point loss at Jacksonville State, VMI reeled off ten straight wins to go 14–2 and 6–0 in league play. The streak was broken at home by Liberty in the first and currently only sellout in Cameron Hall history with 5,029 fans in attendance. After defeating Charleston Southern to move to 20–3 and 11–2 in the conference, VMI skidded towards the end of the year with three straight losses, two of which were against weaker opponents. They managed to regroup, ending the season with two wins and advancing to another Big South tournament appearance. However, they were denied their first bid to the NCAA tournament since 1977 again, falling to Radford, 108–94, ending a 24–8 season. The 24 victories were the most since that 1977 campaign, and it was only the fourth 20-win season in program history.

The Keydets had a down year in 2009–10, going 10–19 and 5–13 in league play. They still managed to lead the nation in scoring, and did so again the following year. On July 18, 2011, Baucom was signed to a contract extension through the 2015 season. In 2011–12, VMI clinched its first back-to-back winning seasons since the teams of the late 1970s by going 17–16. This included yet another surprise run to the Big South tournament final, which was thwarted by UNC Asheville. It was, however, the first year in which VMI did not lead the country in points per game. They failed to do so again in 2012–13, and had another losing season.

Baucom's contract was extended again through the end of the 2017–18 season (at the same salary) by VMI athletic director Donny White on August 21, 2013. Baucom's 2013–14 squad became the fifth in school history to have a twenty-win season, going 22–13 with an 11–5 Big South record. It was the last season for VMI in the Big South, as they had announced their transition back to the Southern Conference the previous spring. After falling in the conference tournament semifinals, VMI received and accepted an invitation to participate in the 2014 CollegeInsider.com Postseason Tournament. It was the program's first national postseason tournament appearance in thirty-seven years, and the Keydets made the most of their second opportunity. Thanks in large part to the play of senior center D. J. Covington, VMI defeated Canisius, IPFW and Ohio to advance to the tournament's semifinals. Covington scored 37 points against Canisius, and 41 points against IPFW, which was a CIT tournament record. VMI would fall to Yale, 75–62, in the semifinals, which was televised nationally on CBS Sports Network.

On July 2, 2014, Baucom and VMI agreed to another contract extension (at the same salary) that would run through the 2018–19 season.

=== The Citadel ===
Baucom was named head coach at The Citadel on March 30, 2015, succeeding Chuck Driesell.

== Head coaching record ==
=== College ===
Record table
Season	Team	Overall	Conference	Standing	Postseason
Tusculum Pioneers (South Atlantic Conference) (2005–2007)
2003–04	Tusculum	19–8		1st	
2004–05	Tusculum	18–11		2nd	NCAA Division II First Round
Tusculum:		37–19 (.661)			
VMI Keydets (Big South Conference) (2005–2014)
2005–06	VMI	7–20	2–14	8th	
2006–07	VMI	14–19	5–9	6th	
2007–08	VMI	14–15	6–8	T–5th	
2008–09	VMI	24–8	13–5	2nd	
2009–10	VMI	10–19	5–13	T–7th	
2010–11	VMI	18–13	10–8	4th	
2011–12	VMI	17–16	8–10	T–6th	
2012–13	VMI	14–17	8–8	2nd (North)	
2013–14	VMI	22–13	11–5	2nd (North)	CIT Semifinal
VMI Keydets (Southern Conference) (2014–2015)
2014–15	VMI	11–19	7–11	6th	
VMI:		151–159 (.487)	75–91 (.452)		
The Citadel Bulldogs (Southern Conference) (2015–2022)
2015–16	The Citadel	10–22	3–15	10th	
2016–17	The Citadel	12–21	4–14	T–8th	
2017–18	The Citadel	11–21	5–13	8th	
2018–19	The Citadel	12–18	4–14	T–8th	
2019–20	The Citadel	6–24	0–18	10th	
2020–21	The Citadel	13–12	5–11	8th	
2021–22	The Citadel	13–18	6–12	9th	
The Citadel:		77–136 (.362)	27–97 (.218)		
Total:		265–314 (.458)			
National champion Postseason invitational champion Conference regular season champion Conference regular season and conference tournament champion Division regular season champion Division regular season and conference tournament champion Conference tournament champion
