= 2007–08 VMI Keydets basketball team =

American college basketball season

2007–08 VMI Keydets men's basketball
- Conference: Big South Conference
- Record: 14–15 (6–8 Big South)
- Head coach: Duggar Baucom (3rd season)
- Assistant coaches: Daniel Willis (3rd season); Jason Allison (3rd season)
- Home arena: Cameron Hall

2007–08 Big South men's basketball standings
	Conf.				Overall
Team	W		L	PCT	W		L	PCT
UNC Asheville	10	–	4	.714	23	–	10	.697
Winthrop †	10	–	4	.714	22	–	12	.647
High Point	8	–	6	.571	17	–	14	.548
Liberty	7	–	7	.500	16	–	16	.500
VMI	6	–	8	.429	14	–	15	.483
Coastal Carolina	6	–	8	.429	13	–	15	.464
Radford	5	–	9	.357	10	–	20	.333
Charleston Southern	4	–	10	.286	10	–	20	.333
† 2008 Big South tournament winner As of March 8, 2008; Rankings from AP Poll

The 2007–08 VMI Keydets basketball team represented the Virginia Military Institute during the 2007-08 NCAA Division I men's basketball season. The Keydets were coached by Duggar Baucom in his 3rd year at VMI, and played their home games at Cameron Hall. It was VMI's 4th season in the Big South Conference and the Keydets' 100th season of basketball. VMI finished the year with a 14–15 record, and a 6–8 mark in league play, good for fifth place in the conference.

== Roster ==
2007–08 VMI Keydets men's basketball team
Players
Coaches

Pos.	#	Name	Height	Weight	Year	Hometown
G	1	Adam Lonon	5 ft 11 in (1.8 m)	175 lb (79 kg)	So	Richmond, VA
F	2	Willie Bell	6 ft 6 in (1.98 m)	205 lb (93 kg)	Jr	Newport News, VA
G	3	Chavis Holmes	6 ft 4 in (1.93 m)	195 lb (88 kg)	Jr	Charlotte, NC
G	4	Joey Cantafio	5 ft 6 in (1.68 m)	150 lb (68 kg)	Fr	Richmond, VA
G	10	Austin Kenon	5 ft 11 in (1.8 m)	180 lb (82 kg)	Fr	Virginia Beach, VA
G	12	Nick Matson	6 ft 4 in (1.93 m)	190 lb (86 kg)	Jr	Sacramento, CA
F	11	Quinn Brownfield	6 ft 7 in (2.01 m)	195 lb (88 kg)	Fr	Kyle, TX
G	20	Carl Josey	6 ft 5 in (1.96 m)	195 lb (88 kg)	So	Surrey, England
G	22	Christian Hunter	6 ft 2 in (1.88 m)	180 lb (82 kg)	Fr	Chagrin Falls, OH
F	34	Hunter Houston	6 ft 6 in (1.98 m)	195 lb (88 kg)	Fr	Birmingham, AL
F	23	Travis Holmes	6 ft 4 in (1.93 m)	195 lb (88 kg)	Jr	Charlotte, NC
C	50	Stephen Sargent	7 ft 0 in (2.13 m)	245 lb (111 kg)	Fr	Fayetteville, GA
G	55	Reggie Williams	6 ft 6 in (1.98 m)	195 lb (88 kg)	Sr	Prince George, VA

Head coach

- Duggar Baucom

Assistant coach(es)

- Daniel Willis
- Jason Allison

Legend

- (C) Team captain
- (S) Suspended
- (I) Ineligible
- (W) Walk-on
- Injured
- Current redshirt

== Schedule ==
Date time, TV	Rank^{#}	Opponent^{#}	Result	Record	Site (attendance) city, state
Regular Season
November 9*; 7:30 pm		vs. Northern Colorado	L 97–104	0–1	Clune Arena (661); Colorado Springs, CO
November 10*; 7:30 pm		vs. Dartmouth	L 87–98	0–2	Clune Arena (941); Colorado Springs, CO
November 14*; 7:00 pm		West Virginia Wesleyan	W 135–81	1–2	Cameron Hall (756); Lexington, VA
November 21*; 7:00 pm		James Madison	W 90–83	2–2	Cameron Hall (2,494); Lexington, VA
November 25*; 7:00 pm, Big Ten Network		at Ohio State	L 57–90	2–3	Value City Arena (6,670); Columbus, OH
November 28*; 7:00 pm		Columbia Union	W 156–91	3–3	Cameron Hall (603); Lexington, VA
December 1*; 1:00 pm		Army	L 69–71	3–4	Cameron Hall (3,254); Lexington, VA
December 4*; 7:30 pm		at South Carolina State	L 88–89	3–5	SHM Memorial Center (679); Orangeburg, SC
December 8*; 1:00 pm		Howard	W 95–59	4–5	Cameron Hall (2,731); Lexington, VA
December 10*; 7:00 pm		Newport News Apprentice	W 112–96	5–5	Cameron Hall (712); Lexington, VA
December 20*; 8:00 pm		at William & Mary	W 83–72	6–5	Kaplan Arena (2,261); Williamsburg, VA
December 30*; 6:00 pm		at Richmond	L 69–71	6–6	Robins Center (4,092); Richmond, VA
January 2*; 7:00 pm		at Mercer	W 102–99	7–6	Hawkins Arena (479); Macon, GA
January 8*; 12:00 pm		Southern Virginia	W 123–85	8–6	Cameron Hall (897); Lexington, VA
January 12; 7:45 pm		at Charleston Southern	W 93–91 ^{OT}	9–6 (1–0)	CSU Field House (812); North Charleston, SC
January 14; 7:00 pm		at Coastal Carolina	W 107–100	10–6 (2–0)	Kimbel Arena (1,027); Conway, SC
January 19; 1:00 pm		UNC Asheville	L 87–90 ^{OT}	10–7 (2–1)	Cameron Hall (4,219); Lexington, VA
January 23; 7:00 pm		at Winthrop	L 41–85	10–8 (2–2)	Winthrop Coliseum (3,027); Rock Hill, SC
January 28; 7:00 pm		Liberty	L 81–87	10–9 (2–3)	Cameron Hall (1,459); Lexington, VA
February 2; 7:00 pm		at High Point	L 71–90	10–10 (2–4)	Millis Center (2,191); High Point, NC
February 5; 7:00 pm		Radford	L 102–108 ^{OT}	10–11 (2–5)	Cameron Hall (967); Lexington, VA
February 9; 1:00 pm		Coastal Carolina	W 88–83	11–11 (3–5)	Cameron Hall (2,807); Lexington, VA
February 11; 7:00 pm		Charleston Southern	W 109–85	12–11 (4–5)	Cameron Hall (1,236); Lexington, VA
February 16; 7:00 pm, MASN		at UNC Asheville	W 97–75	13–11 (5–5)	Justice Center (1,148); Asheville, NC
February 20; 7:00 pm		Winthrop	L 70–80	13–12 (5–6)	Cameron Hall (2,236); Lexington, VA
February; 7:00 pm, MASN		at Radford	L 83–86 ^{OT}	13–13 (5–7)	Dedmon Center (2,186); Radford, VA
February 26; 7:00 pm		at Liberty	W 81–79	14–13 (6–7)	Vines Center (2,046); Lynchburg, VA
March 1; 1:00 pm		High Point	L 88–99	14–14 (6–8)	Cameron Hall (3,364); Lexington, VA
2008 Big South Conference men's basketball tournament
March 4; 7:00 pm		at Liberty; Quarterfinal	L 88–103	14–15	Vines Center (2,077); Lynchburg, VA
*Non-conference game. ^{#}Rankings from AP Poll. (#) Tournament seedings in parentheses. All times are in Eastern Time.
