= All-Military Classic =

All–Military Classic
- Sport: College basketball
- Founded: 2011
- Folded: 2014
- No. of teams: 4
- Country: United States
- Venue: Rotating campus sites
- Most titles: Air Force (2)
- Broadcasters: CBS Sports (2011); ESPNU (2013)

The All-Military Classic was an annual two-day college basketball tournament hosted at rotating campus sites that featured four military academies – Air Force, Army, The Citadel, and VMI. The tournament was inaugurated in 2011, and was originally broadcast by CBS Sports Network for the semifinal games, though was most recently televised by ESPNU and ESPN3 in 2013. The fourth and final edition of the tournament was hosted and won by Army in 2014.

== History ==
The tournament began in 2011 and was hosted by the Air Force Academy at the Clune Arena in Colorado Springs, Colorado. The format was a simple four-team single elimination tournament with a third-place consolation game. Air Force won the inaugural tournament, and won the 2012 tournament which was hosted by The Citadel at the McAlister Field House as well. VMI, who played host in 2013, won the title on their home court by defeating Air Force 71–63 in the championship game, which was also the first time Air Force had ever lost in the tournament, going 5–0 in previous games.

The final installment of the tournament took place from November 14–15, 2014 at Army's Christl Arena in West Point, New York. The Black Knights first defeated Air Force and proceeded to win the title by beating VMI 92–86 in the championship game. It was the school's first AMC victory, and Kyle Wilson was named the tournament's Most Valuable Player with 44 total points in the two games. The host school of the tournament would end up winning the title three out of the four years it was played, with The Citadel's loss in 2012 being the only exception.

=== 2011 ===
- Host: Air Force – Clune Arena, Colorado Springs, CO

Semifinals; November 11
Army	71
Air Force	87
VMI	103
The Citadel	100

Championship Game; November 12
Air Force	75
VMI	65
Consolation Game
The Citadel	83
Army	72

- All-Tournament Team: Rodney Glasgow (VMI), Ella Ellis (Army), Todd Fletcher (Air Force), Mike Groselle (The Citadel), Keith Gabriel (VMI)
- Tournament MVP: Michael Lyons, Air Force

=== 2012 ===
- Host: The Citadel – McAlister Field House, Charleston, SC

Semifinals; November 10
Air Force	76
Army	65
VMI	76
The Citadel	84

Championship Game; November 11
Air Force	77
The Citadel	70
Consolation Game
VMI	74
Army	80

- All-Tournament Team: Stan Okoye (VMI), Ella Ellis (Army), Lawrence Miller (The Citadel), Mike Groselle (The Citadel), Michael Lyons (Air Force)
- Tournament MVP: Michael Lyons, Air Force

=== 2013 ===
- Host: VMI – Cameron Hall, Lexington, VA

Semifinals; November 8
Army	68
Air Force	79
The Citadel	71
VMI	82

Championship Game; November 9
Air Force	63
VMI	71
Consolation Game
The Citadel	69
Army	84

- All-Tournament Team: Rodney Glasgow (VMI), Kyle Wilson (Army), Brian White (The Citadel), QJ Peterson (VMI), Tre Coggins (Air Force)
- Tournament MVP: QJ Peterson, VMI

=== 2014 ===
- Host: Army – Christl Arena, West Point, New York

Semifinals; November 14
The Citadel	65
VMI	66
Air Force	78
Army	84

Championship Game; November 15
VMI	86
Army	92
Consolation Game
The Citadel	55
Air Force	68

- All-Tournament Team: Kyle Wilson (Army), Tanner Plomb (Army), QJ Peterson (VMI), Max Yon (Air Force), Ashton Moore (The Citadel)
- Tournament MVP: Kyle Wilson, Army

=== Final records ===
Rank	Team	Record	Win %
1	Air Force	6–2	.750
2	VMI	4–4	.500
2	Army	4–4	.500
4	The Citadel	2–6	.250

== Standings history ==
Year	First	Second	Third	Fourth
2011	Air Force	VMI	The Citadel	Army
2012	Air Force	The Citadel	Army	VMI
2013	VMI	Air Force	Army	The Citadel
2014	Army	VMI	Air Force	The Citadel
