= 2013–14 VMI Keydets basketball team =

American college basketball season

2013–14 VMI Keydets basketball

CIT Semilfinals vs. Yale, L 62–75
- Conference: Big South Conference
- North Division
- Record: 22–13 (11–5 Big South)
- Head coach: Duggar Baucom (9th season)
- Assistant coaches: Daniel Willis (9th season); Ryan Mattocks (2nd season); Jason Allison (9th season)
- Home arena: Cameron Hall

2013–14 Big South men's basketball standings
	Conf.				Overall
Team	W		L	PCT	W		L	PCT
North
High Point	12	–	4	.750	16	–	15	.516
VMI	11	–	5	.688	22	–	13	.629
Radford	10	–	6	.625	22	–	13	.629
Campbell	6	–	10	.375	12	–	20	.375
Liberty	5	–	11	.313	11	–	21	.344
Longwood	3	–	13	.188	8	–	24	.250
South
Coastal Carolina †	11	–	5	.688	21	–	13	.618
Winthrop	10	–	6	.625	20	–	13	.606
Gardner–Webb	10	–	6	.625	18	–	15	.545
UNC Asheville	10	–	6	.625	17	–	15	.531
Charleston Southern	6	–	10	.375	13	–	18	.419
Presbyterian	2	–	14	.125	6	–	26	.188
† 2014 Big South tournament winner

The 2013–14 VMI Keydets basketball team represented the Virginia Military Institute in the 2013–14 NCAA Division I men's basketball season. The Keydets were coached by Duggar Baucom, in his 9th year. They played their home games at 5,800-seat Cameron Hall as a member of the North Division of the Big South Conference. They finished the season 23–13, 11–5 in Big South play to finish in second place in the North Division. They advanced to the semifinals of the Big South Conference tournament where they lost to Coastal Carolina. They were invited to the CollegeInsider.com Tournament where they defeated Canisius, IPFW, and Ohio to advance to the semifinals where they lost to Yale.

This season was VMI's last in the Big South Conference, where the Keydets had been since 2003, as they returned to the Southern Conference starting in the 2014–15 academic year.

== Recruiting ==
College recruiting
Name	Hometown	School	Height	Weight	Commit date
Trey Chapman; Small forward	High Point, NC	Wesleyan Christian Academy	6 ft 7 in (2.01 m)	195 lb (88 kg)	
Trey Chapman; Small forward	Recruit ratings: (59)				
QJ Peterson guard	Hedgesville, WV	Massanutten Military Academy	6 ft 0 in (1.83 m)	170 lb (77 kg)	
QJ Peterson guard	Recruit ratings: (59)				
Craig Hinton; Power forward	Kernersville, NC	East Forsyth High School	6 ft 7 in (2.01 m)	195 lb (88 kg)	
Craig Hinton; Power forward	Recruit ratings: No ratings found				
Overall recruit ranking:
Note: In many cases, Scout, Rivals, 247Sports, On3, and ESPN may conflict in their listings of height and weight.; In these cases, the average was taken. ESPN grades are on a 100-point scale.; Sources: "College Basketball Recruiting Schools: VMI Keydets 2013". ESPN.; "2013 Team Ranking". Rivals.

== Roster ==
2013–14 VMI Keydets men's basketball team
Players
Coaches

Pos.	#	Name	Height	Weight	Year	Hometown
G	1	Rodney Glasgow Jr.	5 ft 10 in (1.78 m)	170 lb (77 kg)	Sr	Olney, MD
G	3	Brian Brown	5 ft 11 in (1.8 m)	185 lb (84 kg)	Jr	Kings Mountain, NC
G	4	Christian Burton	5 ft 10 in (1.78 m)	170 lb (77 kg)	Jr	Virginia Beach, VA
G	5	Drew Absher	5 ft 10 in (1.78 m)	170 lb (77 kg)	Sr	Mocksville, NC
G	12	Ot Elmore (redshirt)	6 ft 3 in (1.91 m)	190 lb (86 kg)	Fr	Charleston, WV
F	15	Trey Chapman	6 ft 6 in (1.98 m)	205 lb (93 kg)	Fr	Greensboro, NC
G	21	Tyrell Mason	6 ft 3 in (1.91 m)	190 lb (86 kg)	Fr	Stafford, VA
G	22	QJ Peterson	6 ft 0 in (1.83 m)	170 lb (77 kg)	Fr	Hedgesville, WV
G	23	Tim Marshall	6 ft 3 in (1.91 m)	185 lb (84 kg)	So	Virginia Beach, VA
F/C	24	D. J. Covington	6 ft 9 in (2.06 m)	235 lb (107 kg)	Sr	Virginia Beach, VA
F	25	Craig Hinton	6 ft 7 in (2.01 m)	195 lb (88 kg)	Fr	Winston-Salem, NC
F	32	Phillip Anglade	6 ft 5 in (1.96 m)	210 lb (95 kg)	So	Long Island, NY
C	34	Jarid Watson	6 ft 7 in (2.01 m)	210 lb (95 kg)	Jr	Burtonsville, MD
G	35	Julian Eleby	6 ft 3 in (1.91 m)	190 lb (86 kg)	Fr	Fayetteville, NC
F	40	Jordan Weethee	6 ft 6 in (1.98 m)	220 lb (100 kg)	RS So	Greensboro, NC

Head coach

- Duggar Baucom

Assistant coach(es)

- Daniel Willis
- Jason Allison
- Ryan Mattocks

Legend

- (C) Team captain
- (S) Suspended
- (I) Ineligible
- (W) Walk-on
- Injured
- Current redshirt

=== Depth chart ===
Pos.	Starting 5	Bench 1	Bench 2
F/C	D.J. Covington	Trey Chapman	Jarid Watson
F	Phillip Anglade	Jordan Weethee	Craig Hinton
G/F	Brian Brown	Tim Marshall	Christian Burton
G	Q.J. Peterson	Julian Eleby	Tyrell Mason
PG	Rodney Glasgow Jr.	Drew Absher	Ot Elmore

== Schedule ==
Date time, TV	Opponent	Result	Record	Site (attendance) city, state
Regular season
November 8*; 3:30 pm, ESPNU	The Citadel; All-Military Classic Semifinals	W 82–71	1–0	Cameron Hall (3,419); Lexington, VA
November 9*; 8:30 pm, ESPN3	Air Force; All-Military Classic Finals	W 71–63	2–0	Cameron Hall (4,195); Lexington, VA
November 12*; 7:00 pm, ESPN3	at Wake Forest	L 71–98	2–1	Joel Coliseum (5,581); Winston-Salem, North Carolina
November 16*; 1:00 pm	Bluefield State	W 121–80	3–1	Cameron Hall (2,126); Lexington, VA
November 18*; 7:00 pm, ESPN3	at Virginia Tech	L 92–105	3–2	Cassell Coliseum (4,162); Blacksburg, VA
November 20*; 7:00 pm	Bridgewater	W 112–86	4–2	Cameron Hall (1,364); Lexington, VA
November 27*; 7:00 pm	at William & Mary	L 67–97	4–3	William & Mary Hall (3,111); Williamsburg, VA
December 3*; 7:00 pm	at Elon	L 70–87	4–4	Alumni Gym (1,018); Elon, NC
December 7*; 1:00 pm	Wright State	W 94–74	5–4	Cameron Hall (2,430); Lexington, VA
December 9*; 7:00 pm	Virginia–Lynchburg	W 110–78	6–4	Cameron Hall (814); Lexington, VA
December 19*; 7:00 pm	at East Carolina	L 94–103	6–5	Williams Arena at Minges Coliseum (3,870); Greenville, NC
December 30*; 7:00 pm, ESPN3	at Clemson	L 50–80	6–6	Littlejohn Coliseum (7,540); Clemson, SC
January 4*; 1:00 pm	Washington College	W 128–54	7–6	Cameron Hall (507); Lexington, VA
January 8; 7:00 pm	Longwood	W 95–72	8–6 (1–0)	Cameron Hall (653); Lexington, VA
January 11; 1:00 pm	Liberty	L 80–85	8–7 (1–1)	Cameron Hall (1,567); Lexington, VA
January 15; 7:00 pm	at Radford	W 101–88	9–7 (2–1)	Dedmon Center (2,058); Radford, VA
January 18; 2:00 pm	at Campbell	L 93–97 ^{OT}	9–8 (2–2)	John W. Pope, Jr. Convocation Center (2,498); Buies Creek, NC
January 22; 7:00 pm	High Point	W 82–80 ^{OT}	10–8 (3–2)	Cameron Hall (1,432); Lexington, VA
January 25; 4:00 pm, ESPN3	at Winthrop	L 57–58	10–9 (3–3)	Winthrop Coliseum (1,589); Rock Hill, SC
January 28; 7:00 pm	at UNC Asheville	W 109–105	11–9 (4–3)	Kimmel Arena (959); Asheville, NC
January 31; 7:00 pm	Presbyterian	W 107–93	12–9 (5–3)	Cameron Hall (2,856); Lexington, VA
February 5; 7:00 pm	at Gardner-Webb	W 108–104 ^{4OT}	13–9 (6–3)	Paul Porter Arena (1,450); Boiling Springs, NC
February 8; 1:00 pm	Charleston Southern	W 92–84	14–9 (7–3)	Cameron Hall (3,627); Lexington, VA
February 12; 7:00 pm	Coastal Carolina	L 78–83	14–10 (7–4)	Cameron Hall (970); Lexington, VA
February 15; 7:00 pm, MASN	at Liberty	W 77–70	15–10 (8–4)	Vines Center (2,595); Lynchburg, VA
February 19; 7:00 pm	Campbell	W 84–81	16–10 (9–4)	Cameron Hall (2,371); Lexington, VA
February 22; 1:00 pm	Radford	W 88–76	17–10 (10–4)	Cameron Hall (3,314); Lexington, VA
February 26; 7:00 pm	at High Point	L 67–70	17–11 (10–5)	Millis Athletic Convocation Center (1,241); High Point, NC
March 1; 4:30 pm	at Longwood	W 86–66	18–11 (11–5)	Willett Hall (1,221); Farmville, VA
Big South tournament
March 7; 8:00 pm, ESPN3	vs. Gardner–Webb; Quarterfinals	W 90–77	19–11	HTC Center (3,176); Conway, SC
March 8; 2:00 pm, ESPN3	at Coastal Carolina; Semifinals	L 62–66	19–12	HTC Center (2,892); Conway, SC
CIT
March 18*; 7:00 pm	at Canisius; First round	W 111–100	20–12	Koessler Athletic Center (947); Buffalo, NY
March 22*; 1:00 pm	IPFW; Second round	W 106–95	21–12	Cameron Hall (3,642); Lexington, VA
March 26*; 7:00 pm	at Ohio; Quarterfinals	W 92–90	22–12	Convocation Center (3,734); Athens, OH
April 1*; 7:00 pm, CBSSN	Yale; Semifinals	L 62–75	22–13	Cameron Hall (4,784); Lexington, VA
*Non-conference game. (#) Tournament seedings in parentheses. All times are in Eastern Time.
