= Charlie Schmaus =

American basketball coach (1944–2025)

Biographical details
- Born: April 29, 1944; Ford City, Pennsylvania, U.S.
- Died: October 10, 2025 (aged 81); Myrtle Beach, South Carolina, U.S.

Playing career
- 1963–1966: VMI

Coaching career (HC unless noted)
- 1972–1976: VMI (asst.)
- 1976–1982: VMI

Head coaching record
- Overall: 75–90

Accomplishments and honors

Championships
- SoCon regular season championship (1977); SoCon tournament championship (1977); NCAA Sweet Sixteen (1977)

Charles Frank Schmaus (April 29, 1944 – October 10, 2025) was an American college basketball coach and player. After a three-sport career at the Virginia Military Institute, Schmaus was drafted by the Cincinnati Royals (now the Sacramento Kings) in the fourth round of the 1966 NBA draft. Following a brief stint in the Air Force, Schmaus returned to VMI for six years as head basketball coach in which he most famously led the 1976–77 team to a 26–4 season which included a Southern Conference regular season and tournament championship as well as a trip to the NCAA Sweet Sixteen.

== Early life ==
Schmaus was born in Ford City, Pennsylvania on April 29, 1944, to his parents Charles and Hedwig. Schmaus picked up basketball at an early age, and first played for his middle school in the sixth grade. By his junior year in high school he was playing on the school's varsity team, and in his senior year, Schmaus led the team to a WPIAL finals appearance and was named the MVP of the section.

Coming out of high school, Schmaus was recruited by many colleges, including Maryland, William & Mary, Florida State, and most Pennsylvania schools. Ultimately, Schmaus chose VMI, and in his sophomore season he was part of the 1963–64 team that won the Southern Conference tournament, captained by former VMI head coach Bill Blair. He led the team in scoring in 1965 and 1966 and is currently in the top twenty on the school's all-time scoring list. Schmaus graduated in 1966 with a degree in biology after returning for a fifth year to complete two courses, at which time he earned a football scholarship as a wide receiver. He also played on the school's baseball team.

After graduation, Schmaus joined the Air Force in hopes of becoming a pilot. His plans did not work out, though he did stay to play basketball for the Air Force and traveled around the world.

Schmaus was drafted as the 36th pick in the fourth round in the 1966 NBA draft by the Cincinnati Royals, but he never played in an NBA game.

== Coaching career ==
Schmaus' first and only coaching job came with his alma mater at VMI. He was originally hired as an assistant coach to Bill Blair in 1972. The team had two losing seasons in 1973 and 1974 but showed significant progress with a 13–13 record the following year. In 1976, Blair led the Keydets to their second NCAA tournament appearance in school history which culminated in an Elite Eight berth. VMI slipped through the Southern Conference tournament and went on to defeat Tennessee and DePaul in the NCAA's before falling to Rutgers.

Blair left following the season and went on to coach the NBA's New Jersey Nets and Minnesota Timberwolves. Schmaus then took over the head coaching reins, and continued VMI's success with a 26–4 campaign and another SoCon regular-season and tournament title. At the core of the team were forwards Ron Carter and Will Bynum, who led the team in scoring, with Carter averaging over 20 points per game. Dave Montgomery, the starting center, was among the top players in the nation in field goal percentage, having shot 65% the year before. VMI earned its first AP Poll ranking, finishing the year at number 20. The team's 26 wins are still the most in school history.

The next season, VMI went 21–7, and 7–3 in the SoCon, but lost some of the firepower they had from the past two years. They were eliminated in the tournament semifinals. The program then took a downhill turn, as Schmaus failed to have a winning season the final four years of his tenure as coach, culminating in a 1–25 campaign in 1981–82, after which he was dismissed by the school. Schmaus' career record at VMI is 75–90, which at the time was a program record for most wins by any Keydet head coach.

He never coached again and became a realtor.

== Death ==
Schmaus died in Myrtle Beach, South Carolina, on October 10, 2025, at the age of 81.

== Head coaching record ==
Record table
Season	Team	Overall	Conference	Standing	Postseason
VMI Keydets (Southern Conference) (1976–1982)
1976–77	VMI	26–4	8–2	T–1st	NCAA Sweet Sixteen
1977–78	VMI	21–7	7–3	2nd	
1978–79	VMI	12–15	2–8	8th	
1979–80	VMI	11–16	6–10	T–6th	
1980–81	VMI	4–23	3–13	8th	
1981–82	VMI	1–25	1–15	9th	
VMI:		75–90	27–51		
Total:		75–90			
National champion Postseason invitational champion Conference regular season champion Conference regular season and conference tournament champion Division regular season champion Division regular season and conference tournament champion Conference tournament champion
