= Cameron Hall (arena) =

Arena in Lexington, Virginia, US

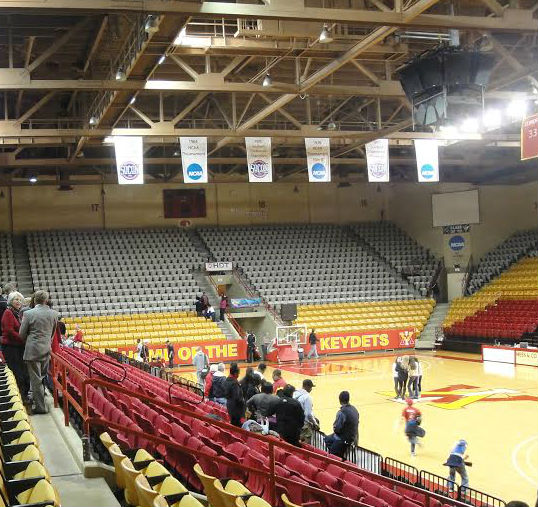
- Interactive map of Cameron Hall
- Location: 401 North Main Street; Lexington, Virginia 24450
- Coordinates: 37°47′18″N 79°26′11″W
- Owner: Virginia Military Institute
- Operator: Virginia Military Institute
- Capacity: 5,029
- Surface: Costen Court (wood)

Construction
- Groundbreaking: July 11, 1979
- Opened: December 5, 1981
- Expanded: 1995
- Cost: $6.8 million
- Architects: Clark, Nexsen, Owen, Barbieri & Gibson, P.C.

Tenant
- VMI Keydets basketball

Cameron Hall is a 5,029–seat multi-purpose arena in Lexington, Virginia. It was built in 1981 and is home to the Virginia Military Institute Keydets basketball team. Although mainly used for basketball, the arena also holds VMI's commencement every May, as well as other large-scale events. It was named after brothers Bruce and Daniel Cameron, VMI Class of 1938 and 1942, respectively.

== History ==
Built in 1981, Cameron Hall was named after brothers Bruce B. Cameron Jr. and Daniel D. Cameron from Wilmington, North Carolina. The Cameron brothers were both graduates of the school, as Bruce graduated in 1938 and Daniel in 1942. They paid for $2.3 million of the building's $6.8 million cost, with a supplementation from the Virginia General Assembly. The other funds were paid for by the VMI Foundation. For their contributions, the Cameron brothers were given life passes to all Cameron Hall events by VMI Board of Visitors president Vincent J. Thomas. The first game was played on December 5, 1981, between VMI and the Virginia Cavaliers. Virginia won the game 76–49 before 4,460 fans, which is currently the fifth-largest crowd in the arena's history.

The venue seats 5,029 spectators for basketball, and 4,300 for plays and concerts. It went largely untouched until 1995, when it received an extensive face lift that included repainted walls and portals, new railings, and a new floor color scheme. Locker rooms were also renovated, with new carpeting, paint, and a lounge. Four years later in 1999, a VMI "Wall of Fame" was added to the mezzanine level, which features photographs and trophies as a tribute to former VMI basketball players and members of the VMI Sports Hall of Fame.

In 2007, VMI installed a new court donated by Ralph Costen, a 1970 graduate of the school. It was the first new floor since the 1995 renovation, and was appropriately named "Costen Court".

== Features ==
Cameron Hall serves as host to the VMI athletic department offices, and contains a library, reception area, and five racquetball courts open to cadets in the basement level. Recently, electronic side screens were added on the sidelines, as well as a "VMI Keydets" moniker that runs along either baseline under the basket. There are concessions on both ends of the arena.

In July 2013, Cameron Hall was ranked among the top venues in mid-major basketball by MidMajorMadness.com.

== Notable games ==
- December 5, 1981 – In the first game in Cameron Hall history, the Virginia Cavaliers, led by three-time national Player of the Year Ralph Sampson, defeated VMI 76–49 before a crowd of 4,460 fans. VMI would go on to have a 1–25 season, including a 1–15 mark in Southern Conference play.
- December 15, 1997 – In one of the very few occasions that VMI hosted an ACC school, the #2-ranked North Carolina Tar Heels defeated the Keydets 105–61 in front of 4,950 fans. The Tar Heels would make the Final Four of that year's NCAA tournament and finish #1 in the AP Poll.
- December 4, 2001 – Featuring the second contest in Lexington between Virginia and VMI, the Cavaliers defeated the Keydets 89–70.
- January 19, 2008 – Off to a surprising 10–6, 2–0 start to the season, VMI battled UNC Asheville in front of 4,219 spectators, which was then the third-largest crowd in Cameron Hall history. Despite a late lead, VMI lost 90–87 in overtime.
- January 17, 2009 – With VMI on a ten-game winning streak and off to their best start in decades at 14–2, their nearby rival Liberty (12–6) came to Lexington in a highly anticipated match-up. The game was the largest crowd in the venue's history, as well as the first and currently only sellout with 5,029 fans in attendance. Liberty won, however, 91–80, thanks to a 35-point performance from Seth Curry.
- March 3, 2009 – On a Tuesday night, VMI hosted their first Big South Conference tournament game as the second seed, defeating the Coastal Carolina Chanticleers 96–76 to improve to 23–7 on the year.
- February 2, 2013 – In the first nationally televised contest at Cameron Hall, the UNC Asheville Bulldogs defeated VMI 90–79. The game was broadcast on ESPNU.
- March 2, 2013 – VMI defeated the Longwood Lancers on Senior Day, 94–80, to give head coach Duggar Baucom his 117th win, the most all-time by a VMI head coach.
- November 8–9, 2013 – The Keydets hosted the annual All-Military Classic, an early-season tournament featuring the military academies of The Citadel, Army, and Air Force. After defeating The Citadel 82–71 in the first game, they went on to win the tournament with a 71–63 victory over Air Force. It was the school's first regular-season tournament championship since the late 1970s.
- March 22, 2014 – VMI hosted a second-round game of the CIT Tournament, the first national postseason tournament game held in Cameron Hall. The Keydets beat the IPFW Mastodons 106–95. Propelled by D. J. Covington's 41 points, which was a tournament record, VMI advanced to the quarterfinals.

== See also ==
- List of NCAA Division I basketball arenas
