= Christ School (North Carolina) =

Private school in Arden, North Carolina, United States

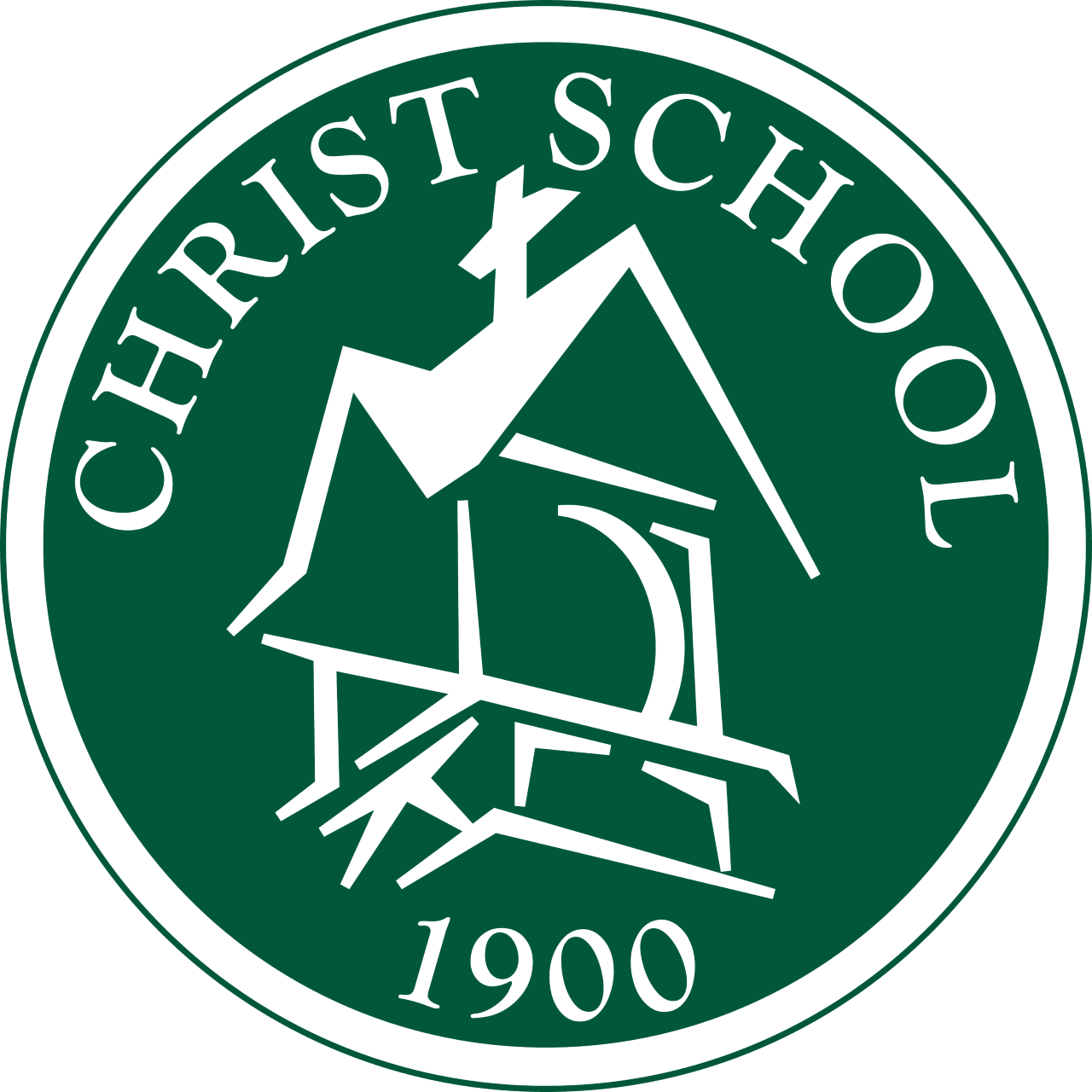

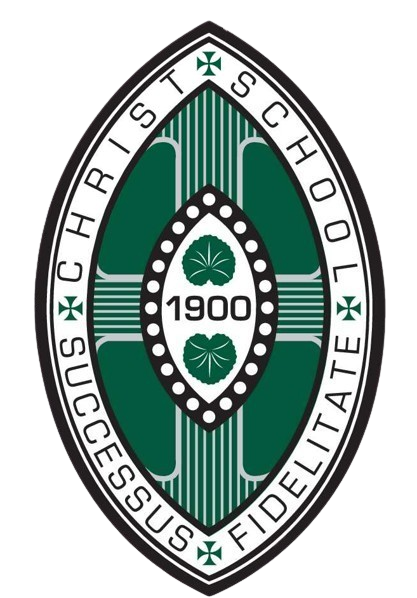

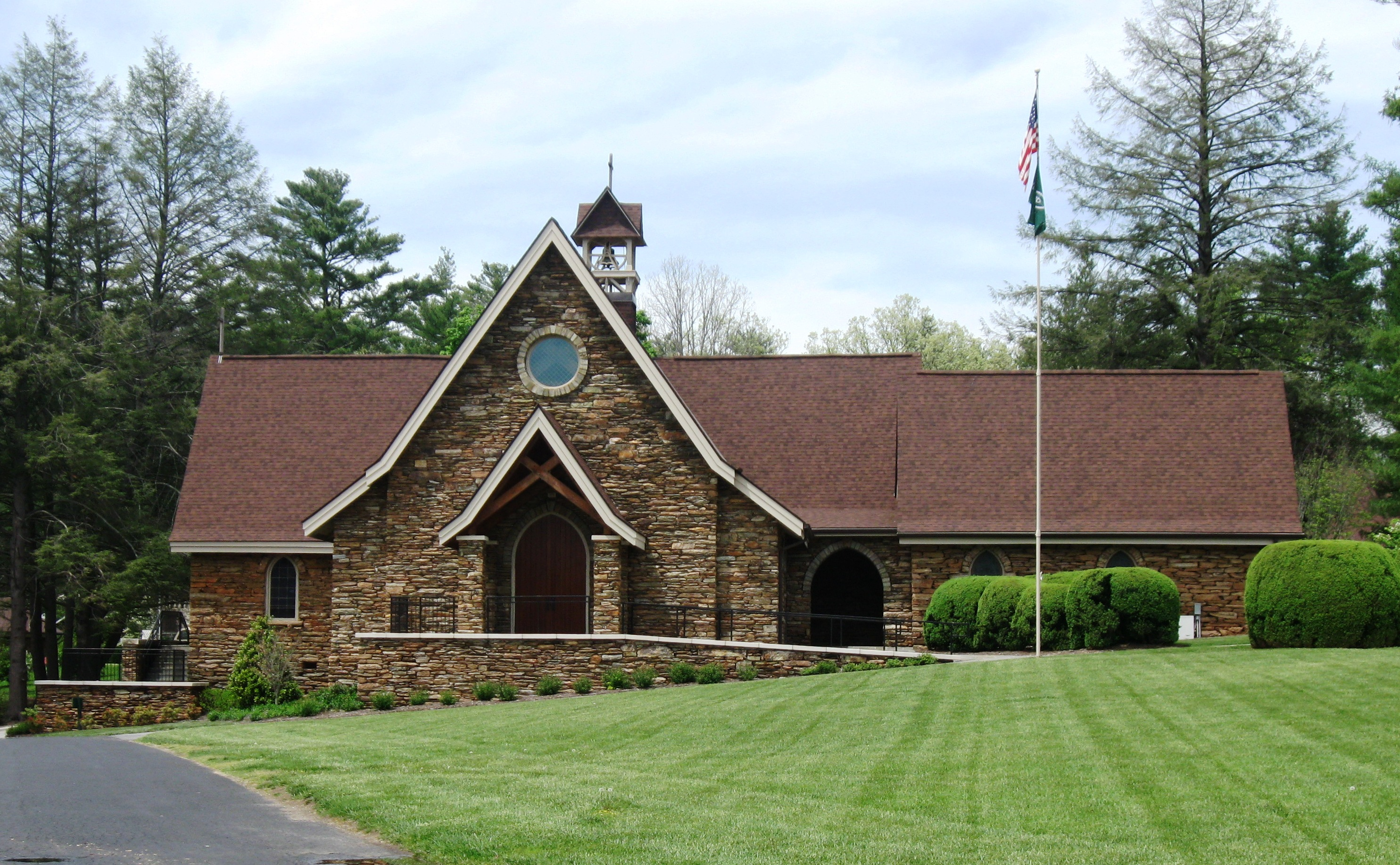
- St. Joseph Chapel

Location
- 500 Christ School Road; Arden, North Carolina 28704; United States; 35°27′53″N 82°29′15″W

Information
- Type: Private, day, boarding, college prep
- Denomination: Episcopal
- Founded: 1900 (126 years ago)
- Founder: Father Thomas Wetmore; Susan Allen Wetmore
- CEEB code: 340095
- Head of School: Dr. Sean K. Jenkins
- Staff: 102
- Grades: 8–12
- Gender: All-boys
- Enrollment: 308
- Campus size: 500 acres (200 ha)
- Campus type: Suburban
- Colors: Green and white
- Athletics: North Carolina Independent Schools Athletic Association (NCISAA)
- Sports: Baseball, Basketball, Cross country, Football, Golf, Lacrosse, Soccer, Swimming, Tennis, Track and field, Wrestling
- Team name: Greenies
- Publication: The Galax
- Tuition: Day students: $37,795; Domestic Boarding students: $73,650; International Boarding students: $78,000 (2026-27)
- Website: www.christschool.org

Christ School is a private college preparatory boarding and day school for boys in Arden, North Carolina, a suburb of Asheville, in the Blue Ridge Mountains. While affiliated with the Episcopal Church, it is open to students of all faiths and backgrounds.

== History ==
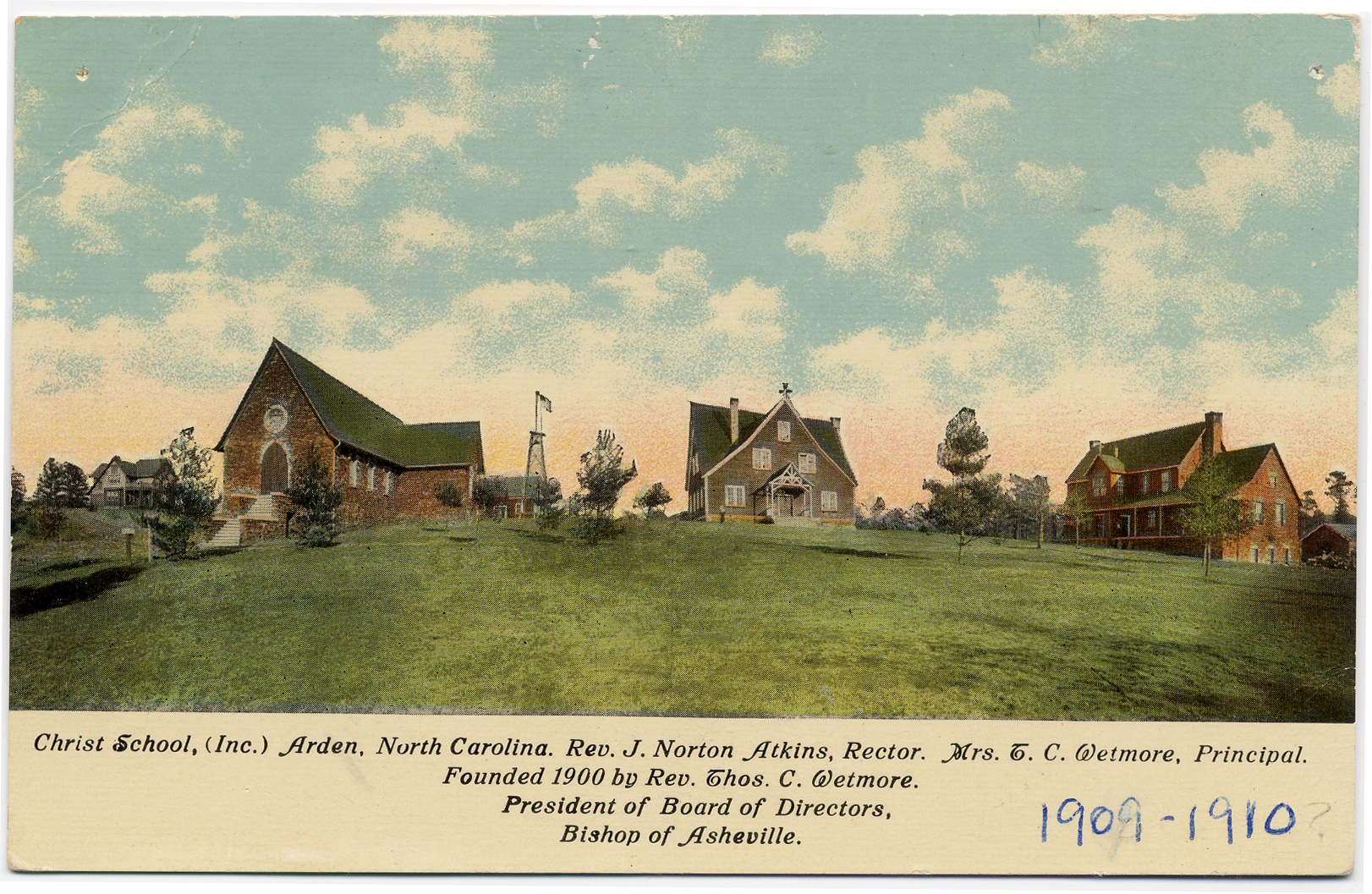
Postcard of Christ School, c. 1909–10

Christ School was founded in 1900 by Thomas and Susan Wetmore.

The 500 acres (200 hectares) campus is home to approximately 300 boys grades 8–12. Students come from 19 different states and 7 different countries.

Christ School is affiliated with the Episcopal Church but receives no funding or direction from it. The community gathers for chapel services three times per week. St Joseph's Chapel is the longest continuously operating Episcopal church in western North Carolina.

== Academics ==
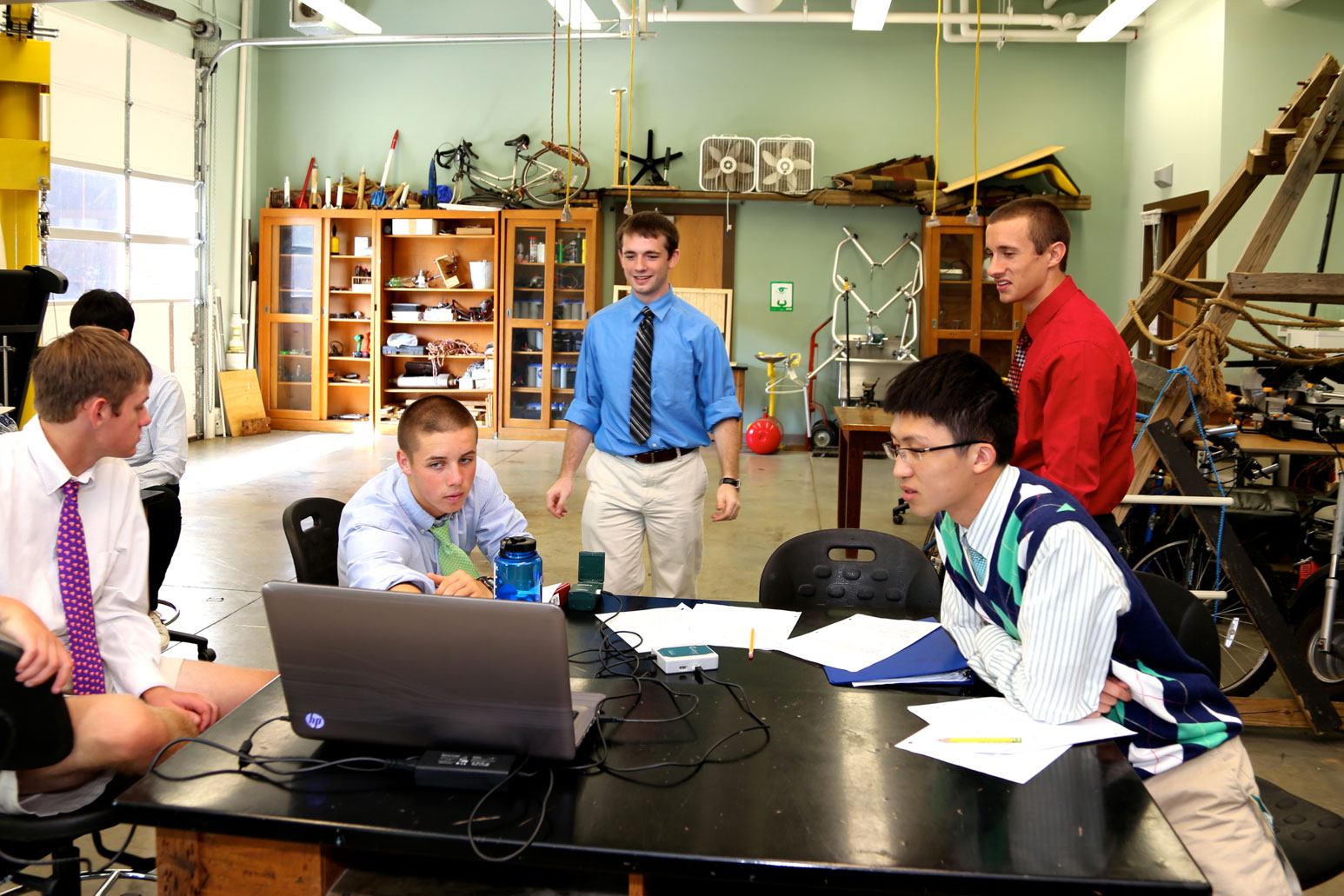
Students at work in the Physics Lab at Christ School

There are 34 Honors classes and 27 Advanced Placement class offered. More than 75% of the faculty live on campus.

In addition to on-campus learning, there are an average of five international trips each school year.

=== Art ===
Christ School students have won Gold Keys at the Scholastic Art & Writing Awards, part of the Alliance for Young Artists & Writers as well as Scholastic Art Awards National American Visions Medal.

== Athletics and extracurricular activities ==
All Christ School students are required to participate in sports during each of the three seasons. There are ten varsity sports that students can participate in at school: three in the fall (football, soccer, and cross country), three in the winter (basketball, wrestling and swimming), and five in the spring (track and field, tennis, golf, lacrosse, and baseball.) The outdoor program, theater, an aviation program (named for Robert K. Morgan '36, the pilot of the Memphis Belle), and a number of other programs are offered year-round as sports as well. The Robert Morgan '36 aviation program is one of only three high school aviation programs in the country.

There are 28 student-led clubs. Students produce a literary magazine called The Struan and a yearbook called The Angelus. The school also produces a biannual magazine called The Galax.

=== Golf ===
The golf program has won NCISAA 3A State Championships in 2010, 2012 and 2014.

=== Lacrosse ===
Christ School began a competitive lacrosse program in 2002. Since that time, the program has won ten conference championships and appeared in fourteen consecutive NCISAA playoffs, including State Championship wins in 2017, 2018, and 2019. There have been more than 23 all state selections and four high school All American selections.

=== Outdoor Program ===
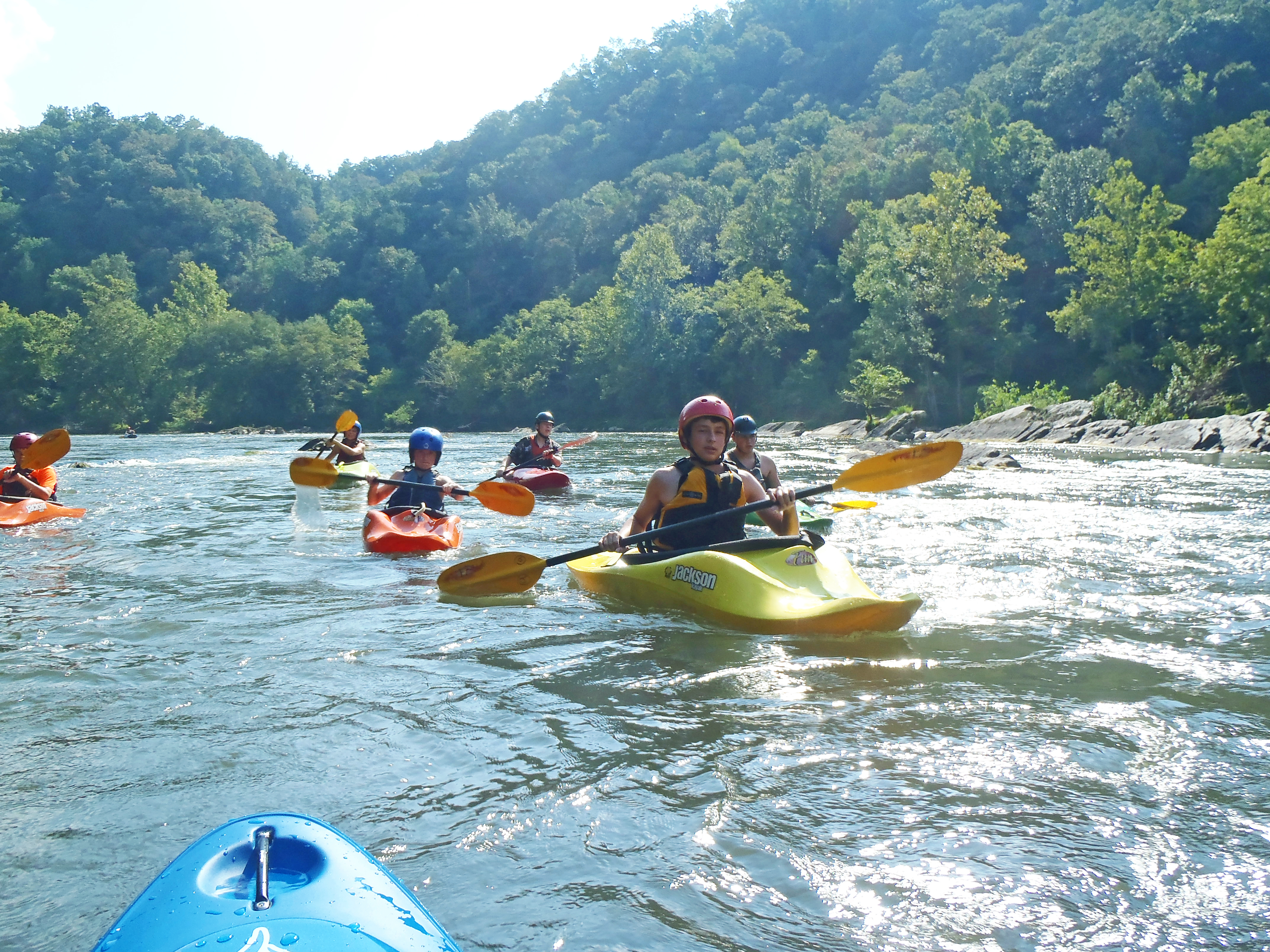
Christ School students kayaking through the Blue Ridge Mountains

The Outdoor Program offers mountain biking, kayaking, rock climbing, hiking, fly fishing, adventure racing, and skiing.

=== Ski and snowboard ===
Beginning in 2009, Christ School formed a Snow Team that practices at Cataloochee and competes regularly in the Cataloochee Interscholastic School Race League. In the 2012 Racing Season, two Snowboard team members, and two Ski team members attended the 2012 Nastar National Championships. The team members placed with two bronze, one silver, and one gold medal finishes.

=== Theater ===
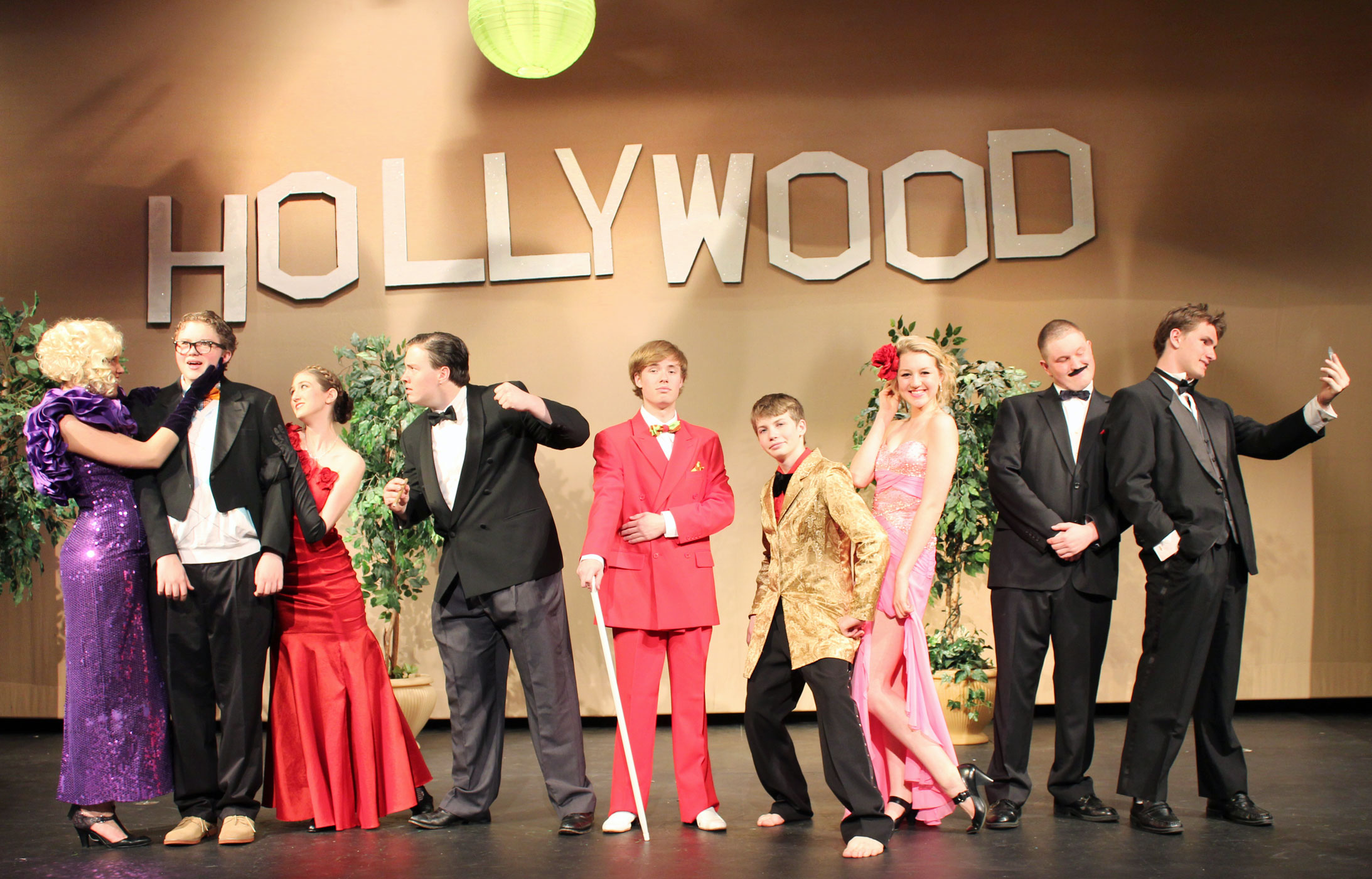
Christ School Theater presents Shakespeare in Hollywood

Theater productions include One Flew Over the Cuckoo's Nest, The Fantasticks, the operetta, The Pirates of Penzance, A Funny Thing Happened on the Way to the Forum, Little Shop of Horrors, and Shakespeare in Hollywood. The plays have done well in regional play competitions, such as the Independent School Theater Festival.

== Notable alumni ==
- John Shorter Stevens, politician and lawyer
- Charles Wright, winner of the Pulitzer Prize, National Book Award, and Poet Laureate of the United States
- Robert K. Morgan, pilot of the Memphis Belle

=== Athletes ===
- John Fulkerson, professional basketball player and former Tennessee Volunteer
- Chavis Holmes, professional basketball player
- Travis Holmes, professional basketball player
- Lakeem Jackson, professional basketball player
- Jalen Lecque, NBA player
- Mason Plumlee, NBA player
- Miles Plumlee, NBA player
- Marshall Plumlee, NBA player
- Aydan White, college football cornerback for the NC State Wolfpack
- Rocky Hansen, NCAA runner up in cross-country, state record holder.
