= Rodney Glasgow Jr. =

American-British basketball player

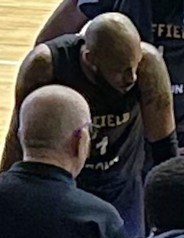

No. 5 – Derby Trailblazers
- Position: Point guard
- League: BCB

Personal information
- Born: October 23, 1992 (age 34) Brooklyn, New York
- Listed height: 180 cm (5 ft 11 in)

Career information
- High school: Our Lady of Good Counsel (Olney, Maryland)
- College: VMI (2010–2014)
- NBA draft: 2014: undrafted
- Playing career: 2014–present

Career history
- 2014–2015: BBC Monthey
- 2015–2016: Leuven Bears
- 2017–2019: BC Prievidza
- 2019–2020: Newcastle Eagles
- 2020–2021: Njarðvík
- 2021–2026: Sheffield Sharks
- 2026-present: Derby Trailblazers

Career highlights
- SLB Cup (2025); BBL Trophy (2020); Big South First-Team (2014); Big South NABC All-District 2nd Team (2014); Big South All-Freshman team (2011)

Rodney Glasgow Jr. (born 23 October 1992) is an American-British basketball player who plays for Derby Trailblazers of the British Championship Basketball. After graduating from the Virginia Military Institute, he went on to play professionally in Europe.

== College career ==
Glasgow Jr. played college basketball with the Virginia Military Institute Keydets. During his senior year, he averaged 18.8 points, 4.1 rebounds and 5.8 assists per game.

== Playing career ==
Glasgow's first professional stop was with the BBC Monthey in the Swiss Basketball League where he averaged 15.2 points and 4.7 assists per game. The following season he appeared in 19 games for Leuven Bears in the Belgian Pro Basketball League, averaging 11.1 points and 2.5 assists.

From 2017 to 2019, Glasgow Jr. played for BC Prievidza in the Slovak Basketball League.

In 2019, Glasgow Jr. signed with Newcastle Eagles of the British Basketball League. On 15 March 2020, he helped the Eagles win the BBL Trophy after beating Solent Kestrels in the cup final.

In August 2020, Glasgow Jr. signed with Úrvalsdeild karla club Njarðvík. For the season he averaged 13.0 points and team leading 5.2 assists per game, helping Njarðvík rallying at the season end, winning their last three games and staving off relegation.

In 27 August 2026, Glasgow Jr left Sheffield Sharks where he played for 5 years, and served 4 years as their captain, he won the SLB Cup with the club in 2025. And two days later, he joined the Derby Trailblazers of the British Championship Basketball, which is the second tier of the British basketball pyramid.

== Personal life ==
Glasgow's father is from the British Virgin Islands.
