= Stan Okoye =

American-Nigerian basketball player

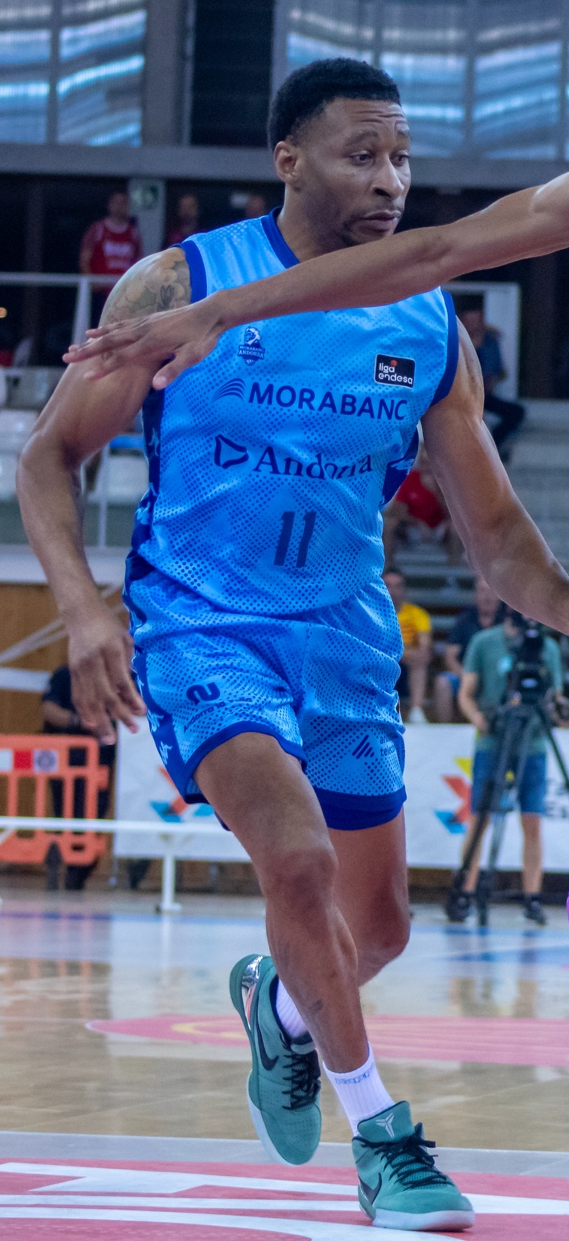
- Okoye with Andorra in 2024

No. 5 – Högsbo Basket
- Position: Small forward / shooting guard
- League: SBL

Personal information
- Born: April 10, 1991 (age 35) Raleigh, North Carolina, U.S.
- Listed height: 6 ft 6 in (1.98 m)
- Listed weight: 215 lb (98 kg)

Career information
- High school: Knightdale (Knightdale, North Carolina)
- College: VMI (2009–2013)
- NBA draft: 2013: undrafted
- Playing career: 2013–present

Career history
- 2013: Barak Netanya
- 2014: Perth Redbacks
- 2014–2015: Varese
- 2015–2016: Matera
- 2016: Trapani
- 2016–2017: Udinese
- 2017–2018: Varese
- 2018–2019: Zaragoza
- 2019–2021: Gran Canaria
- 2021–2022: Zaragoza
- 2022: SIG Strasbourg
- 2022–2023: Scafati Basket
- 2023–2026: Andorra
- 2026–present: Högsbo Basket

Career highlights
- SBL All-Star Five (2014); AP Honorable mention All-American (2013); Big South Player of the Year (2013); First-team All-Big South (2013); Second-team All-Big South (2012); Big South All-Freshman Team (2010)
Medals
Men's basketball
Representing Nigeria
AfroBasket
Gold medal – first place	2015 Tunisia

Stanley Onyekachukwu Okoye (born April 10, 1991) is an American-Nigerian professional basketball player for Högsbo Basket of the Swedish Basketball League (SBL). A 6' 6" (1.98 m) swingman, he was named the 2012–13 Big South Conference Men's Basketball Player of the Year while playing for Virginia Military Institute (VMI).

== High school career ==
Okoye, a native of Raleigh, North Carolina, attended Knightdale High School from 2005 to 2006 through 2008–09. During his four-year varsity career he scored over 1,300 points and grabbed over 550 rebounds, both of which are school records. Okoye also scored a single-game record 42 points during a Class 4A playoff game. Knightdale won 73 games during his tenure. Despite this production on the court, only two NCAA Division I schools offered him basketball scholarships – Campbell University and VMI. Campbell later rescinded their offer, however, leaving Okoye with VMI as his only Division I opportunity, which he then accepted.

== College career ==
Okoye enrolled in fall 2009 at VMI to play for the Keydets. He had initial struggles coping with college life, especially at a military school where upperclassmen put mental and physical pressures on freshmen. At one point he contemplated dropping out before having played in a single college basketball game, but Okoye stuck with it because of support from his teammates. He said, "I stuck it out because of the other guys. I figured if they could take it, I could too."

In 2009–10, Okoye led all Big South Conference freshmen in scoring and field goal percentage in overall games. In conference games, he led all freshmen in scoring, field goal percentage and blocks. For the season he averaged 14.2 points, 6.6 rebounds and 1.5 blocks per game and was named to the Big South All-Freshman Team.

As a sophomore in 2010–11, Okoye improved his averages in points, rebounds, assists and steals per game. His blocks per game dipped slightly from his freshman season, however. Okoye finished his second year with 933 career points. Okoye followed a sophomore year with a junior season that saw him claim a Second Team All-Conference selection. In Big South games he averaged 19.5 points and 8.2 rebounds per game, which were second and fourth, respectively, within the league. He led the Keydets to the Big South tournament championship game, but they lost to UNC Asheville 80 to 64.

Okoye had a breakout senior season in 2012–13 in which he averaged 21.5 points, 9.4 rebounds and 2.6 assists per game. He was named the preseason conference player of the year, an honor he would then garner at the conclusion of the season as well. His scoring and rebounding averages led the Big South and was named its Player of the Week five times throughout the season. VMI lost to Charleston Southern in the conference tournament, thus ending VMI's hopes of a postseason tournament bid. Okoye finished his collegiate career with 2,146 points, 962 rebounds, 212 assists, 152 steals and 103 blocks.

== Professional career ==
On August 13, 2013, Okoye signed with Ikaros for the 2013–14 Greek Basket League season. He left Ikaros before playing in a game for them, and on October 27, 2013, he signed with Barak Netanya of Israel for the rest of the season. In November 2013, he left Netanya after appearing in just four games.

On February 6, 2014, Okoye signed with the Perth Redbacks for the 2014 State Basketball League season. He made his debut for the Redbacks in the team's season opener on March 14, recording 30 points, 13 rebounds, 3 assists and 3 steals in a 96–93 win over the Rockingham Flames. On May 15, he was named the SBL Player of the Week for Round 9. He appeared in all 30 games for the Redbacks in 2014, averaging 28.0 points, 11.2 rebounds, 1.8 assists, 1.8 steals and 1.0 blocks per game.

On August 16, 2014, Okoye signed with Pallacanestro Varese for the 2014–15 Lega Basket Serie A season. In 23 games for Varese, he averaged 5.4 points and 3.9 rebounds per game. On August 17, 2015, Okoye signed with Bawer Matera of the Serie A2 Basket. In February 2016, he left Matera and signed with Pallacanestro Trapani for the rest of the season. On May 27, 2017, Okoye signed with his former club Pallacanestro Varese.

In July 2018, Okoye played for the Denver Nuggets during the 2018 NBA Summer League. On July 28, Okoye signed a one-year deal with Tecnyconta Zaragoza of the Liga ACB. On July 31, 2019, Okoye signed a one-year deal with Herbalife Gran Canaria. He averaged 6.8 points per game. Okoye re-signed with the team on July 18, 2020.

On 13 July 2021, Okoye signed with Zaragoza of the Spanish Liga ACB.

On July 27, 2022, he has signed with SIG Strasbourg of the French LNB Pro A.

On December 6, 2022, he signed with Scafati Basket of the Lega Basket Serie A (LBA).

On July 11, 2023, he signed with MoraBanc Andorra of the Liga ACB.

== National team career ==
Okoye has been a member of the senior men's Nigeria national basketball team, representing them at the AfroBasket tournaments in 2013, 2015 and 2025, as well as at the 2019 World Cup.
