= Lewis Preston (basketball) =

American college basketball coach (born 1970)

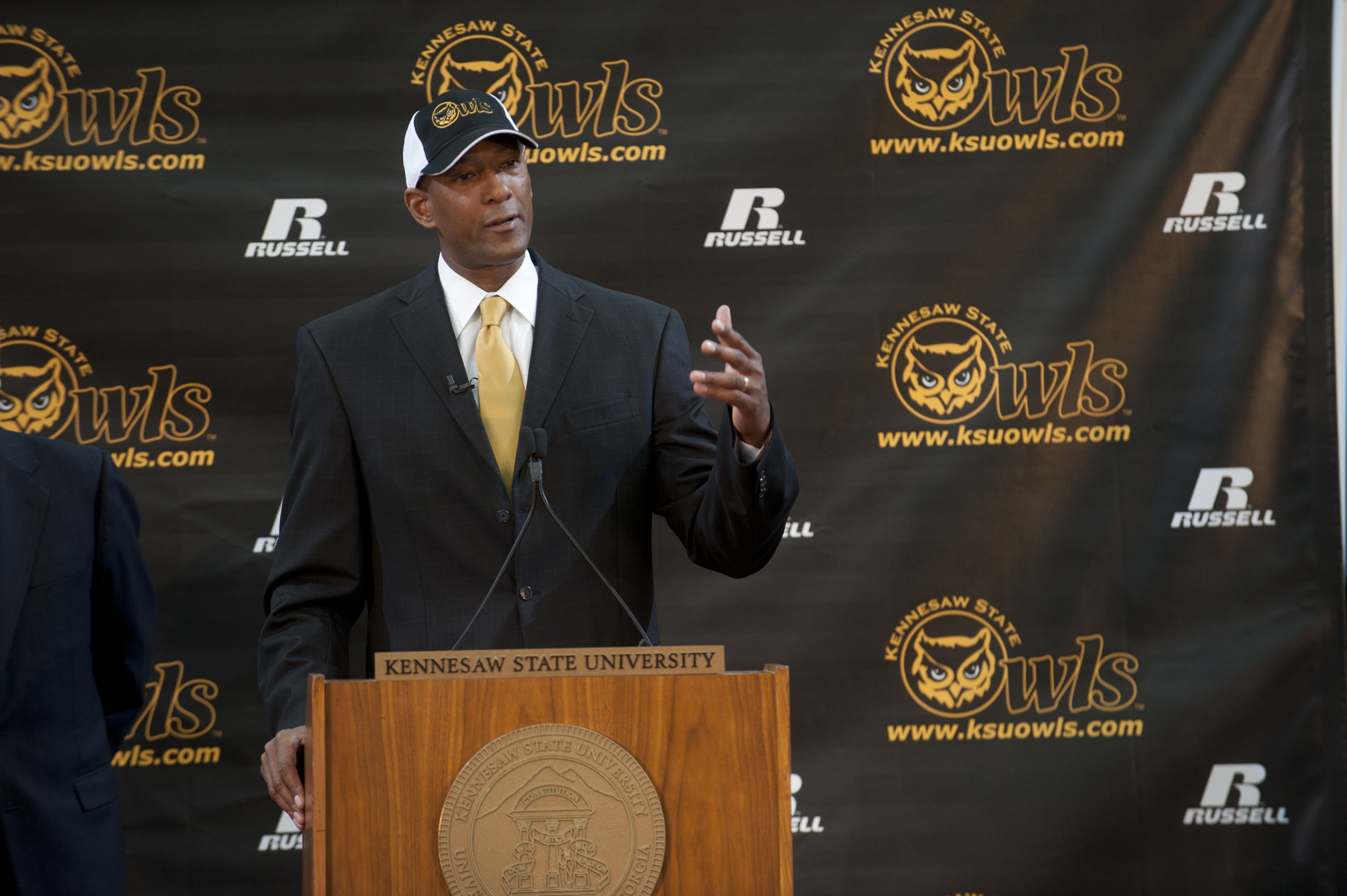

Biographical details
- Born: October 31, 1970 (age 55); Boones Mill, Virginia, U.S.

Playing career
- 1990–1993: VMI

Coaching career (HC unless noted)
- 1998–2000: Coastal Carolina (assistant)
- 2000–2006: Notre Dame (assistant)
- 2006–2008: Florida (assistant)
- 2008–2011: Penn State (assistant)
- 2011–2014: Kennesaw State

Head coaching record
- Overall: 9–67

Lewis Preston (born October 31, 1970) is an American college basketball coach. He served as the head men's basketball coach at Kennesaw State University in Kennesaw, Georgia from 2011 to 2014. Preston served previously as an assistant coach at Pennsylvania State University, Coastal Carolina University, the University of Notre Dame, and under Billy Donovan at the University of Florida.

== Head coaching record ==
Record table
Season	Team	Overall	Conference	Standing	Postseason
Kennesaw State Owls (Atlantic Sun Conference) (2011–2014)
2011–12	Kennesaw State	3–28	0–18	10th	
2012–13	Kennesaw State	3–27	2–16	10th	
2013–14	Kennesaw State	3–12*	0–2		
Kennesaw State:		9–67 (.118)	2–36 (.053)		
Total:		9–67 (.118)			

*Preston took a leave of absence mid-season. Assistant coach Jimmy Lallathin took over the remainder of the year.
