= Gay Elmore =

American lawyer and basketball player

Personal information
- Born: Charleston, West Virginia, U.S.
- Listed height: 6 ft 5 in (1.96 m)
- Listed weight: 180 lb (82 kg)

Career information
- High school: South Charleston (South Charleston, West Virginia)
- College: VMI (1983–1987)
- NBA draft: 1987: 6th round, 133rd overall pick
- Drafted by: Milwaukee Bucks
- Position: Small forward

Career highlights
- 2× SoCon Player of the Year (1986, 1987); SoCon Tournament MVP (1985); Bill Evans Award (1982); No. 33 retired by VMI Keydets
- Stats at Basketball Reference

Gay Elmore is an American former basketball player known for his career at Virginia Military Institute between 1983–84 and 1986–87. During his career, Elmore scored a then-school record 2,423 points in 113 games, which at the time of his graduation was also the fourth-highest total in Southern Conference history. As a sophomore in 1984–85 he scored 17 points in the championship game of the Southern Conference men's basketball tournament, but the Keydets lost to Marshall, 70–65. He was named the tournament MVP. In Elmore's final two seasons he was named the conference player of the year, becoming the 10th player to earn the honor at least twice at that point.

After averaging 25.5 points per game during his senior season, the Milwaukee Bucks selected Elmore in the sixth round (133rd overall) of the 1987 NBA draft, although he never ended up playing in the league. He attended Washington and Lee University School of Law and became a lawyer. Today, he and his wife run Elmore & Elmore, a law firm in Charleston, West Virginia, primarily handling real estate and business law.

His son Jon Elmore played college basketball at Marshall University (2015–19) and became Conference USA's all-time leading scorer. His other son, Ot, also played college basketball at Marshall University and is an assistant coach at Glenville State University.
