= Ron Carter (basketball) =

American basketball player

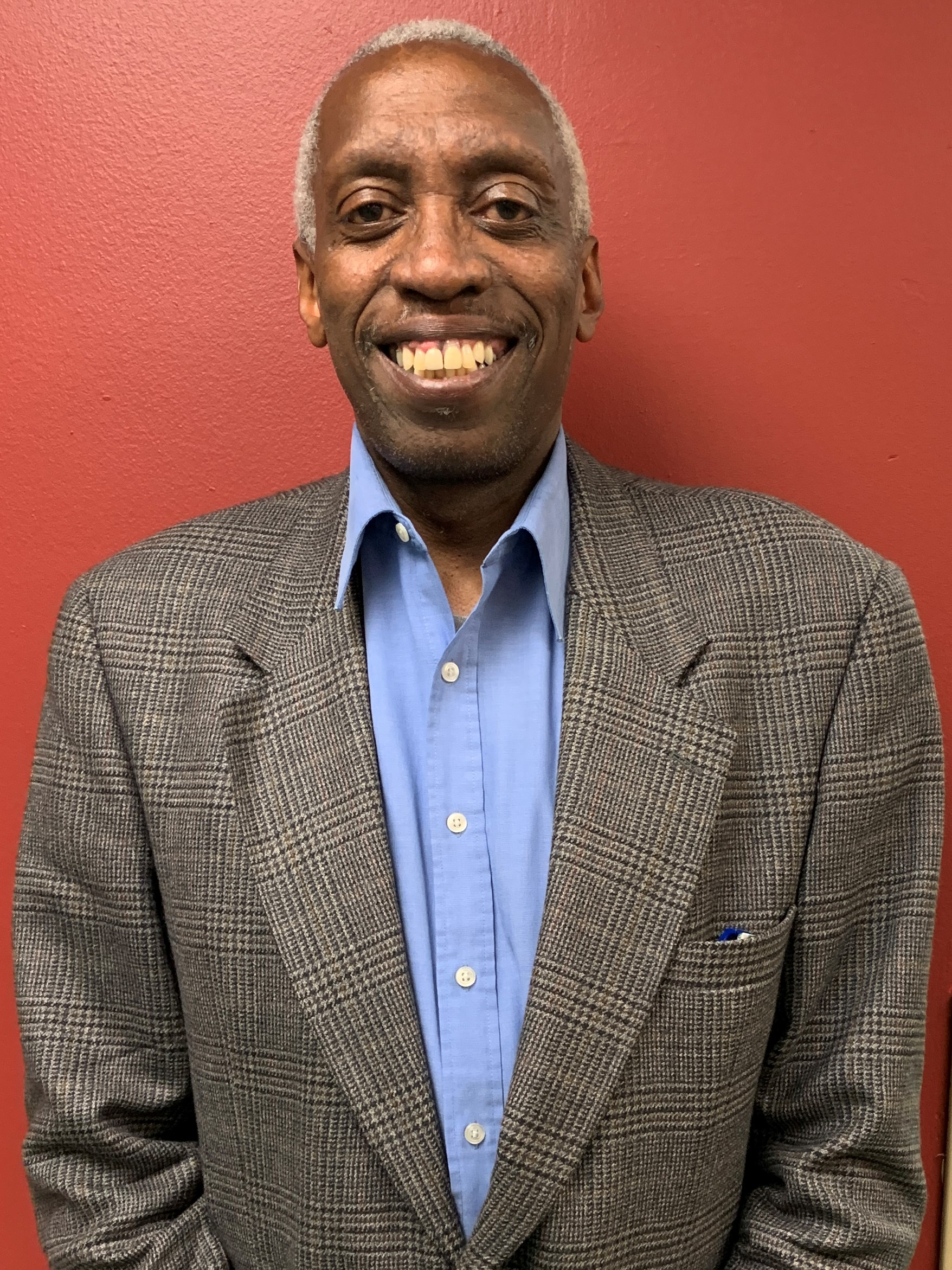
- Carter in 2019

Personal information
- Born: August 31, 1956 (age 70) Pittsburgh, Pennsylvania, U.S.
- Listed height: 6 ft 5 in (1.96 m)
- Listed weight: 190 lb (86 kg)

Career information
- High school: Perry Traditional Academy (Pittsburgh, Pennsylvania)
- College: VMI (1974–1978)
- NBA draft: 1978: 2nd round, 26th overall pick
- Drafted by: Los Angeles Lakers
- Playing career: 1978–1980
- Position: Shooting guard
- Number: 15, 13

Career history
- 1978–1979: Los Angeles Lakers
- 1979–1980: Indiana Pacers

Career highlights
- 2× SoCon Player of the Year (1977, 1978); 3× First-team All-SoCon (1976–1978); No. 13 retired by VMI Keydets
- Stats at NBA.com
- Stats at Basketball Reference

Ronald Carter Jr. (born August 31, 1956) is an American former basketball player who played two seasons in the National Basketball Association (NBA). He played college basketball for the VMI Keydets.

== Early years ==
Carter attended Perry Traditional Academy. He accepted a basketball scholarship from the Virginia Military Institute. He contributed to the school winning two Southern Conference championships (1975–76 and 1976–77). In the NCAA basketball tournament, he led his team to the Elite Eight (1976) and the Sweet 16 (1977).

As a senior, he set school records with 45 points scored in a single-game (against Long Beach State College), 19 free throws made in a single-game (against Siena College), and an average of 26.3 points per contest during the season. He averaged 19.2 points (third in school history), 6.9 rebounds per game and had sixty 20+ scoring games (school record) during his career.

He was a three-time All-SoCon and All-tournament selection. He was a two-time Southern Conference Player of the Year and the SoCon tournament's Most Outstanding Player (1976). He finished his college career as the tenth-highest scorer in conference history (2,228 points).

Carter was the first athlete in school history to have his jersey retired (#13). In 1989, he was inducted into the VMI Sports Hall of Fame. He was named to the Southern Conference's 75th Anniversary third-team Men's Basketball Team. In 2018, he was inducted into the Southern Conference Hall of Fame.

== Professional career ==
Carter was selected by the Los Angeles Lakers in the 2nd round (26th pick overall) of the 1978 NBA draft, becoming the first Virginia Military Institute player to be drafted and to play in the league. He appeared in 46 games under head coach Jerry West. He averaged 3.1 points per game and was waived on October 4, 1979.

On November 15, 1979, he signed as a free agent with the Indiana Pacers. He played in 13 games and averaged 2.5 points. He was cut on December 5. On February 15, 1980, he was re-signed as a free agent by the Indiana Pacers. He was released on February 25.

On September 15, 1983, he attempted a comeback and signed with the Los Angeles Lakers. He was released on October 24.

== Post-playing career ==
After his basketball career, Carter was the director of economic development for the Chicago Housing Authority, a consultant to the Gary, Indiana Housing Authority, and city manager of Benton Harbor, Michigan.

== Personal life ==
Carter has 4 children: sons Ronald and Paul, and daughters Bria and Brooke. Ronald III was a 2-time NCAA All-American triple jumper while attended California State University, Long Beach. Paul played collegiate basketball at the University of Illinois at Chicago and played professionally in Europe.

== Career statistics ==
Legend
GP	Games played	GS	Games started	MPG	Minutes per game
FG%	Field goal percentage	3P%	3-point field goal percentage	FT%	Free throw percentage
RPG	Rebounds per game	APG	Assists per game	SPG	Steals per game
BPG	Blocks per game	PPG	Points per game	**Bold**	Career high

=== NBA ===
==== Regular season ====
Year	Team	GP	GS	MPG	FG%	3P%	FT%	RPG	APG	SPG	BPG	PPG
1978–79	L.A. Lakers	**46**		7.2	**.435**		**.667**	1.0	.5	**.4**	**.2**	**3.1**
1979–80	Indiana	13	0	**9.0**	.405	.000	.286	**1.5**	**.7**	.2	**.2**	2.5
Career		59	0	7.6	.429	.000	.623	1.1	.6	.3	.2	3.0

==== Playoffs ====
Year	Team	GP	MPG	FG%	FT%	RPG	APG	SPG	BPG	PPG
1979	L.A. Lakers	2	1.0	.000	–	.0	.0	.0	.0	.0
