= Reggie Williams (basketball, born 1986) =

American basketball player (born 1986)

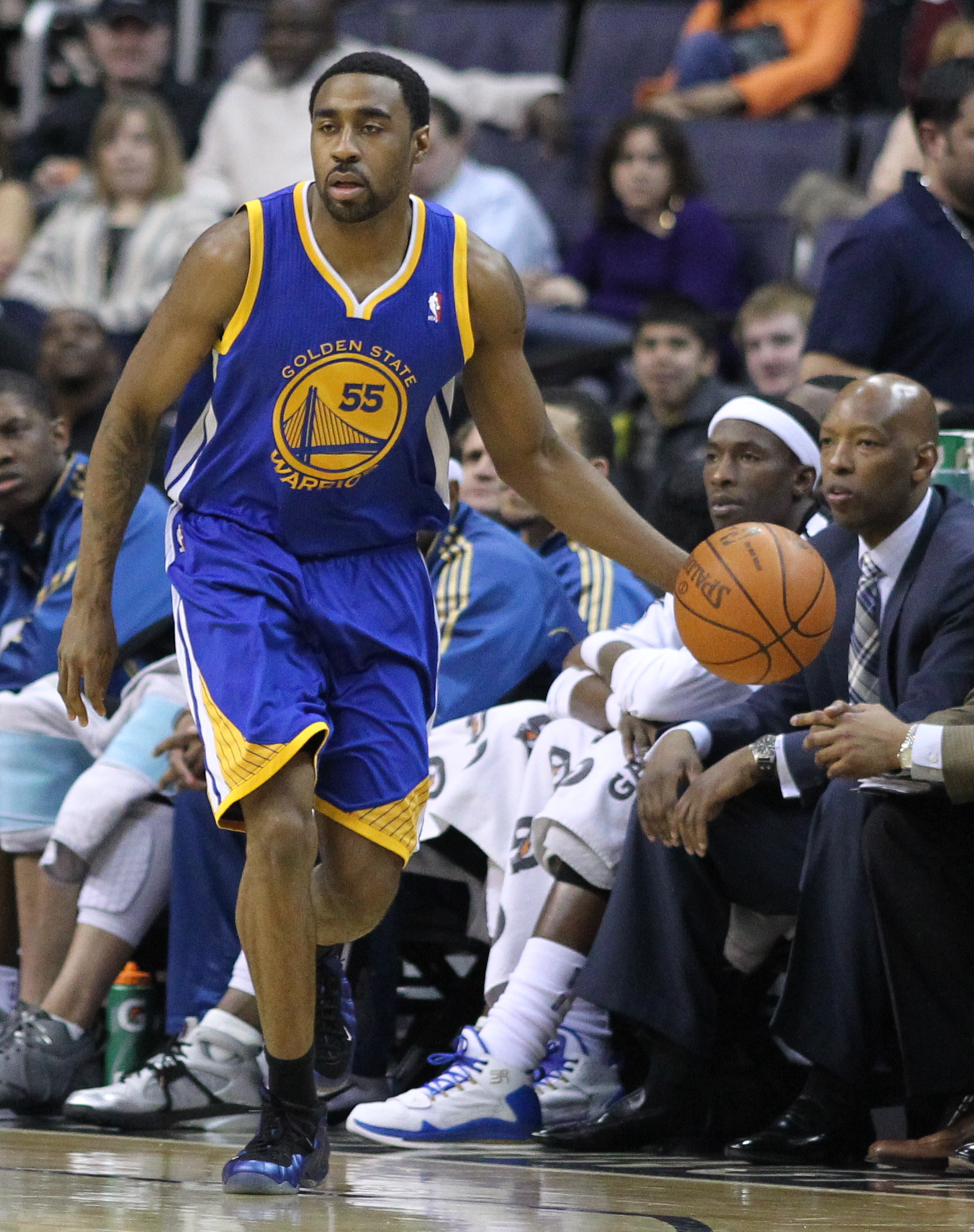
- Williams with the Golden State Warriors in 2011

Personal information
- Born: September 14, 1986 (age 40) Prince George, Virginia, U.S.
- Listed height: 6 ft 6 in (1.98 m)
- Listed weight: 210 lb (95 kg)

Career information
- High school: Prince George (Prince George, Virginia)
- College: VMI (2004–2008)
- NBA draft: 2008: undrafted
- Playing career: 2008–2019
- Position: Shooting guard / small forward
- Number: 55, 14, 5

Career history
- 2008–2009: JDA Dijon
- 2009–2010: Sioux Falls Skyforce
- 2010–2011: Golden State Warriors
- 2011: Caja Laboral
- 2011–2013: Charlotte Bobcats
- 2013–2014: Tulsa 66ers
- 2014: Oklahoma City Thunder
- 2014: →Tulsa 66ers
- 2014: San Miguel Beermen
- 2014–2015: Oklahoma City Blue
- 2015: San Antonio Spurs
- 2016: Avtodor Saratov
- 2016–2017: Oklahoma City Blue
- 2016–2017: New Orleans Pelicans
- 2019: Science City Jena
- 2020: Ulsan Hyundai Mobis Phoebus

Career highlights
- Basque Cup champion (2011); 2× NBA D-League All-Star (2010, 2017); All-NBA D-League First Team (2010); 2× NCAA scoring champion (2007, 2008); 2× First-team All-Big South (2007, 2008); Second-team All-Big South (2006); Big South All-Freshman Team (2005); No. 55 retired by VMI Keydets
- Stats at NBA.com
- Stats at Basketball Reference
Medals
Men's basketball
Representing United States
FIBA AmeriCup
Gold medal – first place	2017 Argentina

Reginald Leon Williams II (born September 14, 1986) is an American former professional basketball player who played seven seasons in the National Basketball Association (NBA) for five teams. He played college basketball for the Virginia Military Institute (VMI) where he is the school's all-time leading scorer and led the country in scoring twice.

== High school career ==
Williams attended Prince George High School at Prince George, Virginia averaging 20.5 points, 13 rebounds, and eight assists per game as a senior, while sinking a total of 41 three-pointers leading his team to a 22–5 record and to the Central region quarterfinals, all of this while playing several positions, ranging from the point to the pivot.

== College career ==
Williams attended the Virginia Military Institute where he led the NCAA in scoring two straight seasons for the fast-paced VMI team. In April 2007, Williams initially decided to skip his senior season and enter the NBA draft, but later elected to return to school for his senior season. On March 1, 2008, Williams became the state of Virginia's all-time Division I career scoring leader with 2,526 points. Williams graduated from VMI with a bachelor's degree in psychology.

=== College statistics ===
Year	Team	GP	GS	MPG	FG%	3P%	FT%	RPG	APG	SPG	BPG	PPG
2004–05	VMI Keydets	27	26	35.1	.431	.280	.796	4.7	2.5	1.4	.2	15.5
2005–06	VMI Keydets	27	25	33.1	.462	.317	.750	7.0	2.5	1.0	.2	19.0
2006–07	VMI Keydets	33	33	32.4	.531	.319	.659	8.0	4.4	1.7	.3	28.1
2007–08	VMI Keydets	25	21	35.1	.528	.279	.671	9.7	3.9	2.2	.7	27.8
Career		112	105	33.8	.498	.302	.703	7.3	3.4	1.6	.3	22.8

== Professional career ==
After going undrafted in the 2008 NBA draft, Williams signed with the French team JDA Dijon. After playing in France he played in the NBA Development League. He was drafted by the Sioux Falls Skyforce. He averaged 26 points and 5.7 rebounds per game with Sioux Falls before signing a ten-day contract with the Golden State Warriors on March 2, 2010. On March 12, 2010, the Golden State Warriors re-signed Williams to another 10 day contract and later, on March 22, 2010, the Warriors signed Williams for the remainder of the season.

On June 21, 2011, Williams signed a qualifying offer by the Warriors, thus becoming a restricted free agent.

Following the announcement of the 2011 NBA Lockout, on August 23, 2011, Williams signed a contract with the Spanish team Caja Laboral.

On December 11, 2011, the Warriors rescinded their qualifying offer to Williams to conserve cap space to sign Los Angeles Clippers center DeAndre Jordan to an offer sheet, making Williams an unrestricted free agent.

On December 15, 2011, Williams signed a two-year deal reportedly worth $5 million with the Charlotte Bobcats.

On July 19, 2013, Williams signed a multi-year deal with the Houston Rockets. However, he was later waived on October 28, 2013.

On December 20, 2013, Williams was acquired by the Tulsa 66ers of the NBA D-League. On March 6, 2014, Williams signed a 10-day contract with the Oklahoma City Thunder. On March 11, 2014, he was assigned back down to the Tulsa 66ers. He was recalled the same day after playing in the 66ers 109–117 loss to the LA D-Fenders. On March 15, 2014, he was reassigned to the 66ers. On March 16, 2014, he was not offered a second 10-day contract, and returned to the 66ers. On March 28, 2014, he signed another 10-day contract with the Thunder. On April 7, 2014, he was again not offered a second 10-day contract by the Thunder. On May 10, 2014, he signed with the San Miguel Beermen of the Philippine Basketball Association.

On August 12, 2014, Williams signed with the Miami Heat. However, he was later waived by the Heat on October 13, 2014. On December 26, 2014, he was acquired by the Oklahoma City Blue.

On January 28, 2015, Williams signed a 10-day contract with the San Antonio Spurs. On February 8, he signed a second 10-day contract with the Spurs. On February 20, he signed with the Spurs for the rest of the season. On October 24, 2015, he was waived by the Spurs.

On January 9, 2016, Williams signed with Avtodor Saratov of the VTB United League.

On October 17, 2016, Williams signed with the Oklahoma City Thunder, but was waived two days later. On November 3, he was re-acquired by the Oklahoma City Blue. After averaging 17.1 points, 5.8 rebounds and 3.2 assists in 33.3 minutes with the Blue over 11 games, Williams signed with the New Orleans Pelicans on December 10. In his second game for the Pelicans the following day, Williams scored 11 points off the bench in the first half, including 3-of-3 shooting on three-pointers, and finished with 17 in the 120–119 overtime win over the Phoenix Suns. On January 1, 2017, Williams was waived by the Pelicans after appearing in five games and two days later, he was reacquired by the Oklahoma City Blue. On February 25, 2017, Williams returned to the Pelicans on a 10-day contract. On March 7, 2017, he was reacquired by the Blue.

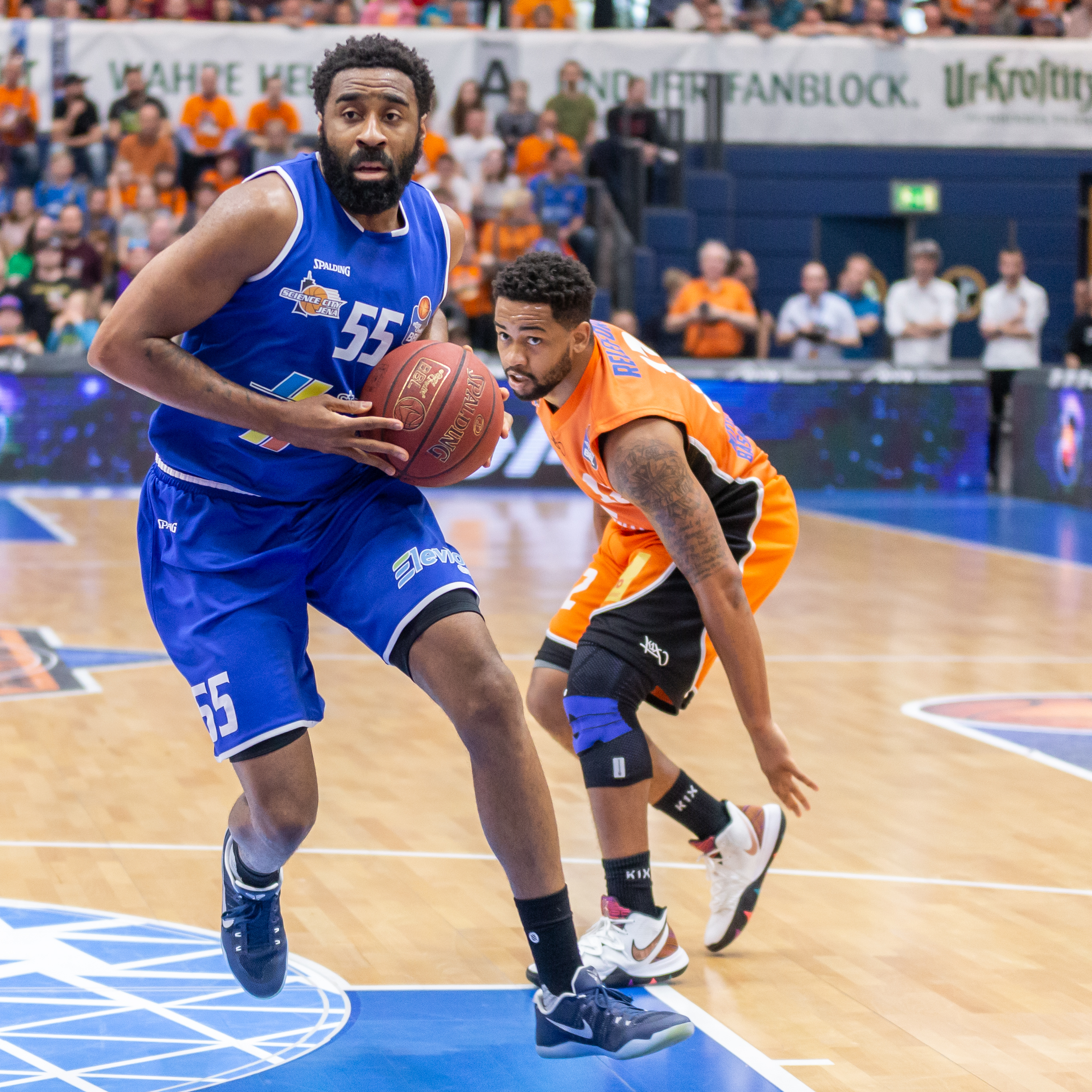
Williams with Science City Jena in 2019

On January 23, 2019, Science City Jena of the Basketball Bundesliga announced that they had added Williams.

In 2020, Williams played for Chinese club Ulsan Hyundai Mobis Phoebus.

=== The Basketball Tournament ===
In 2017, Williams participated in The Basketball Tournament with Ram Nation. Williams had 14.8 PPG and 5.3 RPG during the tournament. Ram Nation advanced to the Elite 8 before being bested by eventual tournament champs Overseas Elite. The Basketball Tournament is an annual $2 million winner-take-all tournament broadcast on ESPN.

== National team ==
Williams played with the senior United States national team at the 2017 FIBA AmeriCup, where he won a gold medal.

== Career statistics ==
Legend
GP	Games played	GS	Games started	MPG	Minutes per game
FG%	Field goal percentage	3P%	3-point field goal percentage	FT%	Free throw percentage
RPG	Rebounds per game	APG	Assists per game	SPG	Steals per game
BPG	Blocks per game	PPG	Points per game	**Bold**	Career high

=== NBA ===
==== Regular season ====
Year	Team	GP	GS	MPG	FG%	3P%	FT%	RPG	APG	SPG	BPG	PPG
2009–10	Golden State	24	10	**32.6**	.495	.359	.839	**4.6**	**2.8**	**1.0**	**.3**	**15.2**
2010–11	Golden State	**80**	9	20.3	.469	**.423**	.746	2.7	1.5	.4	.0	9.2
2011–12	Charlotte	33	**13**	22.6	.416	.308	.725	2.8	1.8	.6	.1	8.3
2012–13	Charlotte	40	0	9.5	.432	.306	.476	1.3	1.0	.3	.0	3.7
2013–14	Oklahoma City	3	0	5.7	**.556**	.333	.000	.0	.3	.3	.0	3.7
2014–15	San Antonio	20	0	5.3	.385	.158	**1.000**	.9	.5	.1	.0	1.9
2016–17	New Orleans	6	0	13.2	.348	.455	.857	1.0	.7	.1	.0	4.5
Career		206	32	18.3	.458	.363	.747	2.4	1.5	.4	.1	7.8

=== NBA D-League ===
==== Regular season ====
Year	Team	GP	GS	MPG	FG%	3P%	FT%	RPG	APG	SPG	BPG	PPG
2009–10	Sioux Falls	**31**	**31**	**40.0**	**.576**	**.410**	**.824**	5.6	3.2	**1.6**	**.2**	**26.4**
2013–14	Tulsa	25	21	38.0	.476	.355	.732	**5.7**	**4.9**	**1.6**	**.2**	20.1
Career		56	52	39.1	.533	.380	.794	5.6	3.9	1.6	.2	23.6

=== International Leagues ===
==== Regular season ====
Year	Team	GP	GS	MPG	FG%	3P%	FT%	RPG	APG	SPG	BPG	PPG
2008–09	Dijon	**29**	**27**	**29.0**	.451	**.223**	.617	**5.3**	**2.5**	**.8**	**.5**	**12.7**
2011–12	Caja Laboral	10	1	11.9	**.479**	.167	**1.000**	1.2	.8	**.8**	.0	5.0
Career		39	28	24.6	.455	.217	.625	4.3	2.1	.8	.4	10.7
