= Chavis Holmes =

American basketball player

Personal information
- Born: May 9, 1986 (age 40) Charlotte, North Carolina, U.S.
- Listed height: 6 ft 4 in (1.93 m)
- Listed weight: 185 lb (84 kg)

Career information
- High school: Zebulon B. Vance (Charlotte, North Carolina); Christ School (Arden, North Carolina)
- College: VMI (2005–2009)
- Position: Shooting guard
- Number: 5

Career history
- 2009–2010: Caja Rioja
- 2011: Rayos de Hermosillo
- 2012: Haukar
- 2012–2013: Surrey United
- 2013–2014: VfL AstroStars Bochum
- 2014–2015: Worcester Wolves

Career highlights
- NCAA steals leader (2009); First-team All-Big South (2009); Second-team All-Big South (2008)

Chavis Holmes (born May 9, 1986) is an American basketball player. He played college basketball player for the Virginia Military Institute Keydets basketball program. Homes was also named one of the top returning performers in the Big South Conference in 2008 with a combined 664 points in the 2008 season. He was named to the 2009 First Team All-Big South Conference.

== Biography ==
=== High school career ===
Chavis and his twin brother, Travis Holmes, began playing high school basketball at Vance High School in Charlotte. The team won the 2002–03 North Carolina state championship. Holmes played the 2003–04 and 2004–05 seasons at Christ School in Arden, North Carolina. In the 2004 season, Holmes averaged 3.7 assists and 3.4 steals a game for Christ School. The team that season was runner up for the North Carolina state championship. In his senior season, Holmes averaged 17.5 points and 4.3 rebounds. His team won the state title and Holmes was awarded All-State and first team All-Western North Carolina honors.

=== College career ===
In 2005, Chavis and his brother became the third set of twins to play basketball at the Virginia Military Institute. In his sophomore season Holmes led the Big South Conference in three-pointers made and ranked 10th in the nation, while shooting 39% from three-point range. Holmes' defensive game was also strong. He recorded 2.8 steals a game, making him 4th in the nation. Holmes improved on his sophomore season in 2007–08 and was rewarded with a spot on the Second Team All-Big South Conference. In the 2008–09 season Holmes led the nation in steals. As a result, Holmes earned First Team All-Big South Conference honors and a spot the Richmond Times-Dispatch All-State Team. In 2009 the Holmes brothers became the NCAA's all-time leading scoring twins.

== Professional career ==
In 2009–10, Holmes played with Caja Rioja of the Spanish LEB, averaging 13.2 points per game and 2.8 rebounds per game in 38 contests.
