= Travis Holmes =

American basketball player (born 1986)

Personal information
- Born: May 9, 1986 (age 40) Charlotte, North Carolina, U.S.
- Listed height: 6 ft 4 in (1.93 m)
- Listed weight: 195 lb (88 kg)

Career information
- High school: Zebulon B. Vance (Charlotte, North Carolina); Christ School (Arden, North Carolina)
- College: VMI (2005–2009)
- NBA draft: 2009: undrafted
- Playing career: 2009–2013
- Position: Guard

Career history
- 2010: Rio Grande Valley Vipers
- 2011–2012: Njarðvík
- 2012: Maccabi Hod HaSharon
- 2012–2013: Surrey Heat

Career highlights
- NCAA steals leader (2007); Second-team All-Big South (2009); Big South Defensive Player of the Year (2007); Big South All-Freshman team (2006)

Travis Holmes (born May 9, 1986) is an American former professional basketball player who last played for Surrey United of the British Basketball League (BBL). He played college basketball for the Virginia Military Institute Keydets basketball program. He was named to the 2009 Second Team All-Big South Conference.

== High school career ==
Travis and his twin brother, Chavis, began playing high school basketball at Vance High School in Charlotte. The team won the 2002–03 North Carolina state championship. Holmes played the 2003–04 and 2004–05 seasons at Christ School in Arden, North Carolina. In his senior season, Holmes averaged 19.7 points, 6.0 rebounds, 3.3 assists and 3.0 steals a game. He was awarded Piedmont Athletic Conference of Independent Schools Most Valuable Player in 2005 and his team won the state championship that same year.

== College career ==
In 2005, Travis and his brother became the third set of twins to play basketball at the Virginia Military Institute. In his sophomore season Holmes led the nation in steals with 111 while averaging 3.4 steals a game. He set a school record with 11 steals in one game against Bridgewater. Holmes' strong defensive play earned him a spot on the 2007 All-Big South Tournament Team. In his senior season Holmes earned Second Team All-Big South Conference honors and a spot on the Richmond Times-Dispatch All-State Team. In 2009 the Holmes brothers became the NCAA's all-time leading scoring twins.

== See also ==
- List of NCAA Division I men's basketball players with 11 or more steals in a game
- List of NCAA Division I men's basketball season steals leaders
