= D. J. Covington =

American basketball player

Personal information
- Born: August 5, 1991 (age 35) Virginia Beach, Virginia, U.S.
- Listed height: 6 ft 9 in (2.06 m)
- Listed weight: 235 lb (107 kg)

Career information
- High school: Norfolk Academy (Norfolk, Virginia)
- College: VMI (2010–2014)
- NBA draft: 2014: undrafted
- Playing career: 2014–2016
- Position: Power forward / center

Career history
- 2014: Basic-Fit Brussels
- 2015: Alaska Aces
- 2015: Nea Kifissia
- 2015–2016: Phoenix Hagen

Career highlights
- First-team All-Big South (2014); 2× Big South Defensive Player of the Year (2013, 2014); Big South Freshman of the Year (2011)

Darius Jamar "D. J." Covington (born August 5, 1991) is an American former professional basketball player. He finished his collegiate career with the VMI Keydets basketball team, also finishing as the NCAA's 24th leading scorer in his senior year and won the Big South's Defensive Player of the Year in 2013 and 2014.

== High school career ==
Covington attended Norfolk Academy from 2006 to 2010. In his junior season, he averaged 15 points, 9 rebounds and 2 blocks per game. He followed that up in his senior year with 18 points, 11 rebounds and 3 blocks per game. Covington was named to the first-team All-Tidewater Conference Independent Schools as well as All-Virginia Prep League three times. He also played on the school's football team at wide receiver.

== College career ==
Covington made an impression in his freshman year for VMI in 2010–11, averaging 9.1 points and 5.3 rebounds per game, as well as 57 shot blocks en route to a Big South Freshman of the Year award. He was also dubbed the top Division I freshman in the state of Virginia.

Covington struggled in his sophomore campaign, playing in only 24 of the Keydets' 33 as he was hampered with a back injury. Covington managed to heat up towards the end of the year, shooting 68% from the field in the conference tournament. He ended up averaging only 5 points and 2.7 rebounds per game, which were both career lows. Covington was much improved his junior season, and his 7.2 rebounds and 3.0 blocks per game helped him earn his first Big South Defensive Player of the Year award. He was also effective on the offensive end, scoring 15 points per game, and his 56% shooting percentage led the conference.

Covington continued his upward trend in his senior year. He averaged 20.1 points per game, good for 24th in the country, and pulled down 9.3 rebounds. He shot 59% from the floor and improved his free throw shooting as well, shooting 70% from the line. His 106 blocks gave him a career 272 rejections, which became a VMI career record. Covington beat out D. J. Cunningham of UNC Asheville by two points to earn his second straight Defensive Player of the Year award.

== Professional career ==
=== 2014–15 season ===
On May 19, 2014, Covington signed with Basic-Fit Brussels for the 2014–15 Scooore League season. In December 2014, he parted ways with Brussels after appearing in eight games. On January 17, 2015, he signed with the Alaska Aces of the Philippine Basketball Association. However, he last just four games with Alaska before being replaced in the line-up by Damion James on February 18. Nine days later, he signed with Nea Kifissia for the rest of the 2014–15 Greek Basket League season.

=== 2015–16 season ===
On July 22, 2015, Covington signed with Phoenix Hagen of Germany for the 2015–16 season.
