= VMI Keydets basketball =

Men's basketball team representing Virginia Military Institute

2025–26 VMI Keydets basketball team
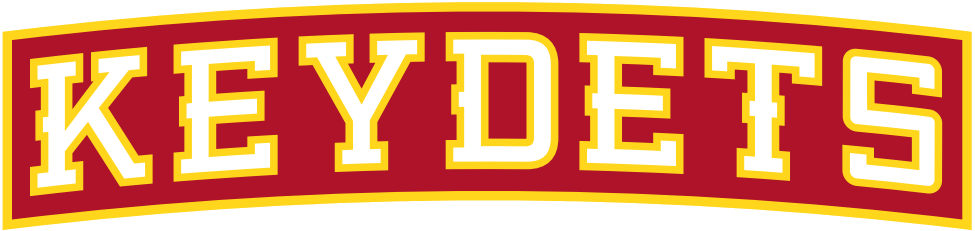
- Institution: Virginia Military Institute
- First season: 1908–09
- All-time record: 960–1,636 (.370)
- Head coach: Andrew Wilson (4th season)
- Conference: SoCon
- Location: Lexington, Virginia
- Arena: Cameron Hall (capacity: 5,800)
- Nickname: Keydets
- Colors: Red, white, and yellow

Uniforms
Home	Away	Alternate

NCAA tournament Elite Eight
- 1976
Other NCAA tournament results
Sweet Sixteen	1976, 1977
Appearances	1964, 1976, 1977

Conference tournament champions
- 1964, 1976, 1977

Conference regular-season champions
- 1976, 1977

The VMI Keydets basketball team represents the Virginia Military Institute in Lexington, Virginia, in the sport of men's college basketball. They compete in the Southern Conference of the NCAA Division I. They have played their home games in Cameron Hall since 1981. VMI has played basketball since 1908, and had played in the Southern Conference (SoCon) until 2003, when they moved to the Big South. VMI rejoined the SoCon on July 1, 2014. They are coached by Andrew Wilson. The Keydets have appeared three times in the NCAA Division I men's basketball tournament, most recently in 1977; their tournament drought is the ninth longest in history.

Notably, VMI is one of only two Division I schools that do not sponsor women's basketball. The other is fellow Southern Conference member and senior military college: The Citadel.

== History ==
=== Early years ===
The VMI basketball program began in 1908 under head coach Pete Krebs, and team went 3–3 in their inaugural season. VMI enjoyed mild success within the first several years of its existence, achieving twelve winning seasons in seventeen years as an independent between 1908 and 1925, including records of 11–1 and 16–1 1920 and 1921, respectively. Pinky Spruhan, who coached the Keydets from 1919 to 1922, had a 38–9 coaching record which still stands as the highest winning percentage of any VMI head basketball coach (.809).

=== Southern Conference ===
VMI joined the Southern Conference in 1925 at which time they were led by 4th-year head coach W. C. Raftery. After a 7–8 overall mark and 3–5 conference record in their opening season in the SoCon, VMI finished in 20th place or lower in the conference four of the next six seasons. Raftery departed in 1934 with a 68–112 record; the 68 wins are the 4th-most in VMI history.

Throughout the next 30 years, VMI never placed better than 5th in the conference. This stretch included one winless season and two winless conference marks. From 1943 to 1953, VMI failed to win more than five games in any season. The Keydets saw 13 different head coaches, five of which were only tenured for one year.

==== Louis Miller era ====
Hired in 1958, Louis "Weenie" Miller became the first coach to lead VMI to an NCAA tournament appearance. After seasons of 5–13, 4–16 and 5–17, the Keydets managed to go 9–11 and 6–8 in SoCon play in the 1961–62 season. The nine wins were the most for the program since 1953–54, and they made their first Southern Conference tournament semifinal appearance since 1941.

Two seasons later, VMI went 12–12 and 7–7 in the conference which was their first non-losing season since 1942–43. Despite being the 4th seed, VMI narrowly ran their way through the SoCon tournament defeating Furman, Davidson, and George Washington in succession. The three wins came by a combined 10 points. In the NCAA tournament, VMI fell to Princeton 86–60. Miller left VMI following the season's end.

==== Bill Blair & Charlie Schmaus era ====
VMI returned to mediocrity and losing seasons following their Southern Conference title. Gary McPherson replaced Miller from 1964 to 1969, followed by Mike Schuler, who was tenured until 1972. The Keydets more than nine games in a season in that stretch, including a 1–25 campaign in 1970–71, which is tied for the most losses in a single season in VMI basketball history.

Bill Blair, who also played for VMI, led the Keydets to their first of what would be two consecutive NCAA tournament appearances. In 1975–76, the Keydets went 22–10 which including a 9–3 Socon record; it was the school's first winning record in conference play since 1968, and only their second since 1943. After winning the SoCon tournament, VMI defeated Tennessee 81–75 and DePaul, 71–66 in overtime, before falling to Rutgers by a score of 91–75. The team was led by Ron Carter, who went on to be the 26th overall pick selected by the Los Angeles Lakers in the 1978 NBA draft. The following year, VMI went 26–4, 8–2 SoCon under first-year head coach Charlie Schmaus. After defeating Duquesne 73–66, they fell in the Sweet Sixteen to Kentucky 93–78.

Despite going 21–7 the following year, VMI lost in the Southern Conference tournament semifinals to Marshall. After a dismal 1–25 season two years later, Schmaus departed VMI. Blair went on to become the coach of the NBA's New Jersey Nets and Minnesota Timberwolves.

=== Big South Conference ===
VMI became a member of the Big South Conference in 2003. The first team in VMI's Big South tenure went 6–22 and 4–12 in the conference under Bart Bellairs, who had been the coach since 1994. After a 3–13 conference campaign the following year, Bellairs was fired on February 28, 2005.

==== Duggar Baucom era ====
Between 1978 and 2005, VMI had just three winning seasons between head coaches Marty Fletcher, Joe Cantafio, and Bart Bellairs. During that time the Keydets made only two tournament final appearances in 1985 and 1988. Following the firing of Bellairs in 2005, VMI hired Duggar Baucom, a former Tusculum College head coach and North Carolina state trooper.

Baucom's first season as coached saw continued failure with a 7–20 record. However, the next season in 2006–07, VMI reached the Big South Championship game for the first time, despite a 12–18 regular season and 6th seed in the conference. They ultimately fell to Winthrop 84–81. That season was the first in which Baucom implemented a high-scoring, run-and-gun offense which garnered a considerable amount of notability. VMI averaged 100.9 points per game as well as 14.9 steals per game and 442 total three-pointers made, all of which led the NCAA that year.

In 2008–09, VMI reached the championship again, but fell to Radford 108–94. The loss ended the Keydets' season at 24–8, which was tied for the second-highest single-season win total in VMI history. It was highlighted by a season-opening upset win over Kentucky in Rupp Arena, 111–103. Senior twins Chavis and Travis Holmes led the team with 22 and 19.1 points per game, respectively, and ultimately became the highest-scoring twins in NCAA history.

The Keydets reached the Big South final once again in 2012, despite being the 7th seed, but fell to UNC Asheville 80–64. It was the first season since the 2006–07 campaign that VMI did not lead the nation in scoring, ending a streak of five consecutive years. VMI returned to their usual high-scoring pace in 2013–14, leading the nation in scoring averaging 88.3 points. Most notably, the Keydets made their first post-season tournament in 37 years as they accepted an invitation to the CollegeInsider.com Postseason Tournament. VMI cruised through the first two rounds, defeating Canisius 111–100 and IPFW 106–95. In the quarterfinals they erased a 17-point deficit to defeat Ohio, but fell at home to Yale in the semifinals, 75–62. The loss ended VMI's year at 22–13, which was only the fifth 20-win season in the program's history. On March 30, 2015, Baucom accepted the head coaching position at The Citadel.

== Postseason results ==
=== NCAA tournament results ===
The Keydets have participated in three NCAA Tournaments. Their combined record is 3–3.

Year	Round	Opponent	Result
1964	First Round	Princeton	L 60–86
1976	First Round; Sweet Sixteen; Elite Eight	Tennessee; DePaul; Rutgers	W 81–75; W 71–66; L 75–91
1977	First Round; Sweet Sixteen	Duquesne; Kentucky	W 73–66; L 78–93

=== CBI results ===
The Keydets have appeared in one College Basketball Invitational (CBI). Their record is 0-1.

Year	Seed	Round	Opponent	Result
2022	#8	First Round	#9 UNC Wilmington	L 78-93

=== CIT results ===
The Keydets have appeared in one CollegeInsider.com Postseason Tournament (CIT). Their record is 3–1.

Year	Round	Opponent	Result
2014	First Round; Second Round; Quarterfinals; Semifinals	Canisius; IPFW; Ohio; Yale	W 111–100; W 106–95; W 92–90; L 62–75

== Facilities ==
- Cormack Field House (1930s–1980)

Cormack Field House, nicknamed "The Pit", served as the home of VMI basketball from the 1930s through 1980. There were many notable performances in its time, including a trio of SoCon championships and Elite 8 and Sweet Sixteen VMI squads.

- Cameron Hall (1981–present)

The 5,030-seat Cameron Hall has housed VMI basketball since 1981, and does so today. It replaced aging Cormack Field House, which is now used for indoor track and field.

== Players ==
=== Retired jerseys ===
VMI has retired three jersey numbers, with the most recent being Reggie Williams.

VMI Keydets basketball retired jerseys
No.	Player	Pos.	Career
13	Ron Carter	SG	1975–78
33	Gay Elmore	SF	1983–87
55	Reggie Williams	SF	2004–08

=== Other notable players ===
Name	Years	Notes
Lewis Preston	1990–93	2nd all-time in shot blocks
Jason Conley	2001–02	Only freshman to lead NCAA in scoring (29.3 PPG)
Chavis Holmes	2005–09	5th all-time points leader, 2nd all-time steals leader, 3rd all-time most three-pointers made
Travis Holmes	2005–09	8th all-time points leader, leading all-time steals leader, 8th all-time assists leader
Stan Okoye	2009–13	4th all-time points leader, 2nd all-time rebounds leader, 4th all-time most FG made, 5th all-time blocks leader
D. J. Covington	2010–14	All-time shot blocks leader, 2nd all-time FG percentage

=== Individual career records ===
==== Points ====
1. Reggie Williams – 2,556
2. Gay Elmore – 2,422
3. Ron Carter – 2,228
4. QJ Peterson - 2200
5. Stan Okoye – 2,146
6. Chavis Holmes – 2,065
7. Keith Gabriel – 1,925
8. Austin Kenon – 1,767
9. Travis Holmes – 1,733
10. Ramon Williams – 1,630

==== Rebounds ====
1. Dave Montgomery – 1,068
2. Stan Okoye – 962
3. Bill Ralph – 919
4. Eric Mann – 841
5. Reggie Williams – 820
6. Ron Carter – 809
7. Karl Klinar – 760
8. Charlie Schmaus – 715
9. Steve Powers – 675
10. Chuck Cotton – 661

==== Assists ====
1. Richard Little – 608
2. Mike Huffman – 480
3. Bobby Prince – 452
4. Percy Covington – 432
5. Kelly Lombard – 383
6. Ron Burks – 382
7. Reggie Williams – 368
8. Travis Holmes – 360
9. Darryl Faulkner – 333
10. Rodney Glasgow – 325

==== Steals ====
1. Travis Holmes – 309
2. Chavis Holmes – 304
3. Jason Bell – 240
4. Keith Gabriel – 212
5. Percy Covington – 196
6. Aaron Demory – 180
7. Reggie Williams – 175
8. Ron Burks – 170
9. Willie Bell – 169
10. Richard Little – 168

==== Blocked shots ====
1. Lewis Preston – 202
2. Eric Mann – 184
3. D. J. Covington – 301
4. Jake Stephens — 150
5. Tim Allmond – 110
6. Mike Herndon – 103
7. Stan Okoye – 103
8. Keith Gabriel – 99
9. Matt Murrer – 89
10. Stephen Sargent – 64

== Coaches ==
Statistics updated as of the 2023–24 season.

Coach	Career	Record	Pct.
Pete Krebs	1908–09	3–3	.500
F.J. Pratt	1909–10	2–5	.286
J. Mitchell	1910–11	3–5	.375
Alpha Brummage	1911–13	14–9	.609
W. C. Raftery	1913–14, 1922–34	68–112	.378
Frank Gorton	1914–17	26–10	.722
Earl Abell	1917–1919	14–12	.538
Pinky Spruhan	1919–22	38–9	.809
Frank Summers	1934–36, 1947–49	12–61	.164
Allison Hubert	1936–37, 1942–43	14–19	.424
J. Elmore	1937–38	4–11	.267
Jimmy Walker	1938–42	27–39	.409
Joe Daher	1943–45	2–24	.077
Jay McWilliams	1945–46	1–10	.091
Lloyd Roberts	1946–47	4–15	.211
Bill O'Hara	1949–52	10–56	.152
Chuck Noe	1952–55	24–46	.343
Jack Null	1955–58	12–58	.171
L.F. Miller	1958–64	41–83	.331
Gary McPherson	1964–69	32–77	.294
Mike Schuler	1969–72	13–63	.171
Bill Blair	1972–76	48–60	.444
Charlie Schmaus	1976–82	75–90	.455
Marty Fletcher	1982–86	37–75	.330
Joe Cantafio	1986–94	79–147	.350
Bart Bellairs	1994–05	116–191	.378
Duggar Baucom	2005–15	151–159	.487
Dan Earl	2015–23	73–139	.344
Andrew Wilson	2023-pr.	11–53	.172
