= Jeff Bower =

Jeff Bower may refer to:

- Jeff Bower (American football) (born 1953), American college football coach
- Jeff Bower (basketball) (born 1961), American basketball executive
