= 2013–14 Iona Gaels men's basketball team =

American college basketball season

2013–14 Iona Gaels men's basketball
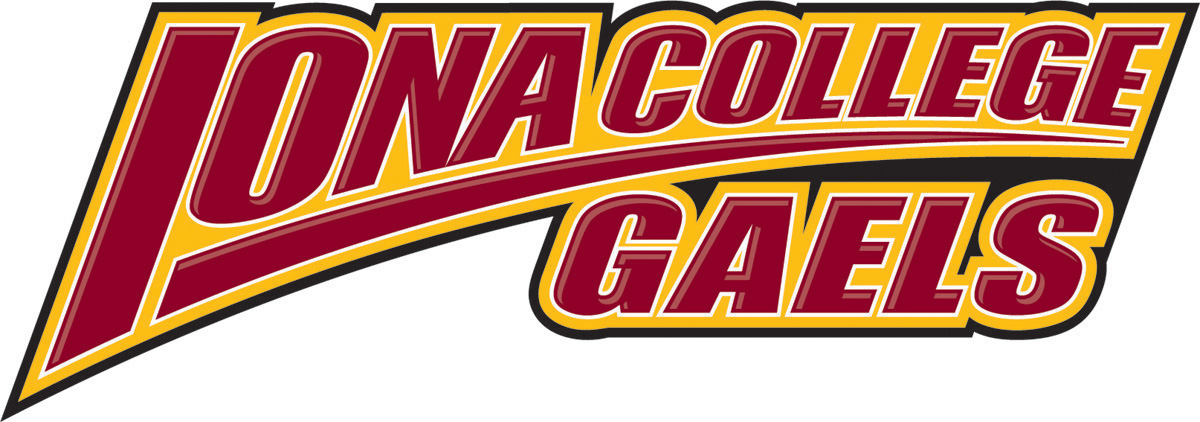

MAAC Regular Season Champions

NIT first round vs. Louisiana Tech, L 88–89
- Conference: Metro Atlantic Athletic Conference
- Record: 22–11 (17–3 MAAC)
- Head coach: Tim Cluess (4th season)
- Assistant coaches: Jared Grasso; Bill O'Keefe; Brock Erickson
- Home arena: Hynes Athletic Center

2013–14 MAAC men's basketball standings
	Conf.				Overall
Team	W		L	PCT	W		L	PCT
Iona	17	–	3	.850	22	–	11	.667
Manhattan †	15	–	5	.750	25	–	8	.758
Quinnipiac	14	–	6	.700	20	–	12	.625
Canisius	14	–	6	.700	21	–	13	.618
Siena	11	–	9	.550	20	–	18	.526
Saint Peter's	9	–	11	.450	14	–	17	.452
Rider	9	–	11	.450	14	–	17	.452
Marist	9	–	11	.450	12	–	19	.387
Monmouth	5	–	15	.250	11	–	21	.344
Fairfield	4	–	16	.200	7	–	25	.219
Niagara	3	–	17	.150	7	–	26	.212
† 2014 MAAC tournament winner

The 2013–14 Iona Gaels men's basketball team represented Iona College during the 2013–14 NCAA Division I men's basketball season. The Gaels, led by fourth year head coach Tim Cluess, played their home games at the Hynes Athletic Center and were members of the Metro Atlantic Athletic Conference. They finished the season 22–11, 17–3 to win the MAAC regular season championship. They advanced to the championship game of the MAAC tournament where they lost to Manhattan. As a regular season conference champion who failed to win their conference tournament, they received an automatic bid to the National Invitation Tournament where they lost in the first round to Louisiana Tech.

== Roster ==
2013–14 Iona Gaels men's basketball team
Players
Coaches

Pos.	#	Name	Height	Weight	Year	Previous school	Hometown
G	0	DaShawn Gomez	6 ft 2 in (1.88 m)	185 lb (84 kg)	Sr	Inglewood (Antelope Valley College)	Inglewood, California
G	1	Isaiah Williams	6 ft 7 in (2.01 m)	200 lb (91 kg)	So	Malcolm X Shabazz (State College Florida Manatee)	Newark, New Jersey
G	2	Kelvin Amayo	6 ft 4 in (1.93 m)	215 lb (98 kg)		NIA Prep (Marshall)	Newark, New Jersey
G	3	Tavon Sledge	5 ft 9 in (1.75 m)	175 lb (79 kg)	RS Jr	Half Hollow Hills West (Iowa State)	Spring Valley, New York
G/F	4	Shackquiel Scott	6 ft 6 in (1.98 m)	215 lb (98 kg)	Fr	Passaic County Tech (Robinson School)	Passaic, New Jersey
G	5	A. J. English	6 ft 4 in (1.93 m)	190 lb (86 kg)	So	Appoquinimink; St. Thomas More (CT)	Wilmington, Delaware
F	11	Grant Ellis	6 ft 5 in (1.96 m)	210 lb (95 kg)	Fr	Hudson Catholic	Newark, New Jersey
G/F	12	Mike Poole	6 ft 6 in (1.98 m)	200 lb (91 kg)	Sr	St. Benedict's Prep (Rutgers)	Rosedale, New York
F	13	David Laury	6 ft 9 in (2.06 m)	255 lb (116 kg)	Jr	NIA Prep (Lamar State–Port Arthur (TX))	East Orange, New Jersey
G	20	Britton Williams	5 ft 11 in (1.8 m)	165 lb (75 kg)	So	Liberty (CSU Bakersfield)	Bakersfield, California
G	21	Tre Bowman	6 ft 5 in (1.96 m)	205 lb (93 kg)	Sr	Central York (Midland College)	York, Pennsylvania
G	22	Sean Armand	6 ft 5 in (1.96 m)	200 lb (91 kg)	Sr	Jacqueline Onassis; CJEOTO Academy (NJ)	Brooklyn, New York
F	32	Ryden Hines	6 ft 10 in (2.08 m)	240 lb (109 kg)	Fr	Dimond (Impact Academy)	Anchorage, Alaska
F	44	Daniel Robinson	7 ft 0 in (2.13 m)	215 lb (98 kg)	Fr	Atlantic Shores Christian (IMG Academy)	Norfolk, Virginia

Head coach

- Tim Cluess (Hofstra)

Assistant coach(es)

- Jared Grasso (Quinnipiac)
- Bill O'Keefe (Queens College)
- Brock Erickson (Assumption (MA))

Legend

- (C) Team captain
- (S) Suspended
- (I) Ineligible
- (W) Walk-on
- Injured
- Current redshirt

Roster
Last update: October 17, 2013

== Schedule ==
Date time, TV	Rank^{#}	Opponent^{#}	Result	Record	Site (attendance) city, state
Regular season
November 9, 2013*; 2:00 pm		at Cleveland State	L 69–73	0–1	Wolstein Center (2,251); Cleveland, OH
November 16, 2013*; 2:00 pm		Wofford	W 76–55	1–1	Hynes Athletic Center (2,046); New Rochelle, NY
November 19, 2013*; 8:00 pm, ESPN3		at No. 2 Kansas	L 66–86	1–2	Allen Fieldhouse (16,300); Lawrence, KS
November 23, 2013*; 2:00 pm		George Mason	W 89–73	2–2	Hynes Athletic Center (1,738); New Rochelle, NY
December 1, 2013*; 2:00 pm		at Florida Gulf Coast	W 90–72	3–2	Alico Arena (3,779); Fort Myers, FL
December 4, 2013; 7:00 pm		Marist	W 83–74	4–2 (1–0)	Hynes Athletic Center (1,753); New Rochelle, NY
December 8, 2013; 1:30 pm		at Fairfield	W 83–72	5–2 (2–0)	Webster Bank Arena (1,407); Bridgeport, CT
December 14, 2013*; 2:00 pm		St. Bonaventure	L 89–102	5–3	Hynes Athletic Center (2,019); New Rochelle, NY
December 19, 2013*; 7:00 pm, NBCSN		at Dayton	L 84–96	5–4	UD Arena (11,539); Dayton, OH
December 22, 2013*; 4:00 pm		at Nevada	L 72–80	5–5	Lawlor Events Center (5,219); Reno, NV
December 28, 2013*; 8:00 pm, ESPN3		at Northern Iowa	L 78–90	5–6	McLeod Center (5,218); Cedar Falls, IA
January 4, 2014; 2:00 pm		Niagara	W 118–92	6–6 (3–0)	Hynes Athletic Center (1,776); New Rochelle, NY
January 6, 2014; 7:00 pm, SNY		at Quinnipiac	L 74–86	6–7 (3–1)	TD Bank Sports Center (1,230); Hamden, CT
January 10, 2014; 7:00 pm		Fairfield	W 84–75	7–7 (4–1)	Hynes Athletic Center (1,507); New Rochelle, NY
January 12, 2014; 2:00 pm		at Siena	W 87–78	8–7 (5–1)	Times Union Center (5,793); Albany, NY
January 17, 2014; 9:00 pm, ESPNU		Canisius	L 83–85	8–8 (5–2)	Hynes Athletic Center (1,278); New Rochelle, NY
January 19, 2014; 5:00 pm		Siena	W 88–74	9–8 (6–2)	Hynes Athletic Center (1,619); New Rochelle, NY
January 24, 2014; 7:00 pm, ESPN3		Quinnipiac	W 95–73	10–8 (7–2)	Hynes Athletic Center (1,823); New Rochelle, NY
January 26, 2014; 2:00 pm		at Saint Peter's	W 71–63	11–8 (8–2)	Yanitelli Center (370); Jersey City, NJ
January 31, 2014; 7:00 pm, ESPNU		Manhattan	W 85–73	12–8 (9–2)	Hynes Athletic Center (2,611); New Rochelle, NY
February 4, 2014; 7:00 pm		at Monmouth	W 89–71	13–8 (10–2)	Multipurpose Activity Center (1,047); West Long Branch, NJ
February 7, 2014; 7:00 pm		at Niagara	W 90–89	14–8 (11–2)	Gallagher Center (1,259); Lewiston, NY
February 9, 2014; 2:00 pm		at Canisius	W 101–91	15–8 (12–2)	Koessler Athletic Center (2,196); Buffalo, NY
February 12, 2014; 7:00 pm		Saint Peter's	W 62–59	16–8 (13–2)	Hynes Athletic Center (1,256); New Rochelle, NY
February 14, 2014; 7:00 pm		Monmouth	W 89–70	17–8 (14–2)	Hynes Athletic Center (1,414); New Rochelle, NY
February 21, 2014; 7:00 pm, ESPNU		at Rider	W 80–77	18–8 (15–2)	Alumni Gymnasium (1,616); Lawrenceville, NJ
February 23, 2014; 2:00 pm		at Marist	W 86–67	19–8 (16–2)	McCann Field House (1,820); Poughkeepsie, NY
February 28, 2014; 7:00 pm, ESPN2		at Manhattan	L 77–80	19–9 (16–3)	Draddy Gymnasium (2,520); Riverdale, NY
March 2, 2014; 2:30 pm, ESPN3		Rider	W 97–81	20–9 (17–3)	Hynes Athletic Center (2,611); New Rochelle, NY
MAAC tournament
March 8, 2014; 12:00 pm, ESPN3		vs. Rider; Quarterfinals	W 94–71	21–9	MassMutual Center (2,716); Springfield, MA
March 9, 2014; 4:30 pm, ESPN3		vs. Canisius; Semifinals	W 75–72	22–9	MassMutual Center (N/A); Springfield, MA
March 10, 2014; 7:00 pm, ESPN2		vs. Manhattan; Championship	L 68–71	22–10	MassMutual Center (1,749); Springfield, MA
NIT
March 19, 2014*; 7:30 pm, ESPN3	No. (6)	at (3) Louisiana Tech; First round	L 88–89	22–11	Thomas Assembly Center (4,643); Ruston, LA
*Non-conference game. ^{#}Rankings from AP Poll, (#) during NIT is seed within region. (#) Tournament seedings in parentheses. All times are in Eastern Time.
