= 2013–14 Monmouth Hawks men's basketball team =

American college basketball season

2013–14 Monmouth Hawks men's basketball
- Conference: Metro Atlantic Athletic Conference
- Record: 11–21 (5–15 MAAC)
- Head coach: King Rice (3rd season)
- Assistant coaches: Rick Callahan; Brian Reese; Derrick Phelps
- Home arena: Multipurpose Activity Center

2013–14 MAAC men's basketball standings
| | Conf. | | | | Overall |
| Team | W | | L | PCT | W | | L | PCT |
|---|---|---|---|---|---|---|---|---|
| Iona | 17 | – | 3 | .850 | 22 | – | 11 | .667 |
| Manhattan † | 15 | – | 5 | .750 | 25 | – | 8 | .758 |
| Quinnipiac | 14 | – | 6 | .700 | 20 | – | 12 | .625 |
| Canisius | 14 | – | 6 | .700 | 21 | – | 13 | .618 |
| Siena | 11 | – | 9 | .550 | 20 | – | 18 | .526 |
| Saint Peter's | 9 | – | 11 | .450 | 14 | – | 17 | .452 |
| Rider | 9 | – | 11 | .450 | 14 | – | 17 | .452 |
| Marist | 9 | – | 11 | .450 | 12 | – | 19 | .387 |
| Monmouth | 5 | – | 15 | .250 | 11 | – | 21 | .344 |
| Fairfield | 4 | – | 16 | .200 | 7 | – | 25 | .219 |
| Niagara | 3 | – | 17 | .150 | 7 | – | 26 | .212 |
† 2014 MAAC tournament winner

The 2013–14 Monmouth Hawks men's basketball team represented Monmouth University during the 2013–14 NCAA Division I men's basketball season. The Hawks, led by third year head coach King Rice, played their home games at the Multipurpose Activity Center. This was their first year as members of the Metro Atlantic Athletic Conference after previously being members of the Northeast Conference from 1985–2012. They finished the season 11–21, 5–15 in MAAC play to finish in ninth place. They lost in the first round of the MAAC tournament to Rider.

== Roster ==
| Number | Name | Position | Height | Weight | Year | Hometown |
|---|---|---|---|---|---|---|
| 0 | Josh James | Guard | 6–2 | 190 | Freshman | White Plains, New York |
| 1 | Ba'shawn Mickens | Guard | 6–0 | 185 | Freshman | Summit, New Jersey |
| 2 | Jalen Palm | Guard | 5–10 | 165 | Sophomore | Louisville, Kentucky |
| 3 | Max DiLeo | Guard | 6–1 | 175 | Junior | Cinnaminson, New Jersey |
| 4 | Greg Novack | Forward | 6–8 | 200 | Freshman | Bethlehem, Pennsylvania |
| 5 | Deon Jones | Guard | 6–6 | 210 | Junior | Wilmington, Delaware |
| 10 | Christian White | Guard | 5–10 | 185 | Sophomore | Rochester, New York |
| 11 | Khalil Brown | Forward | 6–9 | 210 | Junior | Queens, New York |
| 12 | Justin Robinson | Guard | 5–8 | 160 | Freshman | Lake Katrine, New York |
| 13 | Andrew Nicholas | Guard | 6–6 | 205 | Junior | Wrightsville, Pennsylvania |
| 14 | Tyrone O'Garro | Forward | 6–5 | 205 | Sophomore | Newark, New Jersey |
| 30 | Collin Stewart | Guard | 6–7 | 200 | Sophomore | Glenville, New York |
| 33 | Zac Tillman | Center | 6–10 | 275 | Freshman | Yeadon, Pennsylvania |
| 43 | Chris Brady | Center | 6–10 | 250 | Freshman | Greenlawn, New York |
| 44 | Vuk Baletic | Forward | 6–9 | 225 | Freshman | Belgrade, Serbia |
| 45 | Marcelo Ruediger | Center | 6–10 | 245 | Freshman | Natal, Brazil |

== Schedule ==
| Date time, TV | Opponent | Result | Record | Site (attendance) city, state |
Exhibition
| 11/03/2013*; 4:00 pm | Le Moyne | L 66–75 | | Multipurpose Activity Center (505); West Long Branch, NJ |
Regular season
| 11/08/2013*; 7:00 pm | at Hofstra | W 88–84 | 1–0 | Mack Sports Complex (2,063); Hempstead, NY |
| 11/12/2013*; 7:00 pm | Penn | L 73–79 | 1–1 | Multipurpose Activity Center (2,105); West Long Branch, NJ |
| 11/18/2013*; 8:00 pm, FS2 | at Seton Hall | L 66–82 | 1–2 | Prudential Center (5,679); Newark, NJ |
| 11/22/2013*; 9:00 pm, FS1 | at St. John's; Barclays Center Classic | L 54–64 | 1–3 | Carnesecca Arena (4,185); Queens, NY |
| 11/26/2013*; 6:00 pm, BTN | at Penn State; Barclays Center Classic | L 52–84 | 1–4 | Bryce Jordan Center (3,912); University Park, PA |
| 11/29/2013*; 7:00 pm | Mississippi Valley State; Barclays Center Classic | W 81–79 | 2–4 | Multipurpose Activity Center (1,150); West Long Branch, NJ |
| 11/30/2013*; 7:00 pm | North Carolina A&T; Barclays Center Classic | W 76–61 | 3–5 | Multipurpose Activity Center (1,498); West Long Branch, NJ |
| 12/05/2013; 7:00 pm, ESPN3 | Rider | L 83–89 | 3–5 (0–1) | Multipurpose Activity Center (2,705); West Long Branch, NJ |
| 12/08/2013; 2:00 pm | at Manhattan | L 66–75 | 3–6 (0–2) | Draddy Gymnasium (1,428); Riverdale, NY |
| 12/10/2013*; 7:00 pm | at St. Francis Brooklyn | W 73–58 | 4–6 | Generoso Pope Athletic Complex (483); Brooklyn Heights, NY |
| 12/14/2013*; 7:00 pm | Binghamton | W 74–46 | 5–6 | Multipurpose Activity Center (1,010); West Long Branch, NJ |
| 12/21/2013*; 2:00 pm | Fordham | W 87–78 | 6–6 | Multipurpose Activity Center (1,815); West Long Branch, NJ |
| 12/30/2013*; 3:00 pm | Wagner | L 52–59 | 6–7 | Multipurpose Activity Center (1,645); West Long Branch, NJ |
| 01/02/2014; 7:00 pm | Siena | W 63–59 | 7–7 (1–2) | Multipurpose Activity Center (825); West Long Branch, NJ |
| 01/04/2014; 3:00 pm | Quinnipiac | L 77–94 | 7–8 (1–3) | Multipurpose Activity Center (1,421); West Long Branch, NJ |
| 01/10/2014; 7:00 pm | at Niagara | W 85–74 | 8–8 (2–3) | Gallagher Center (1,053); Lewiston, NY |
| 01/12/2014; 2:00 pm | at Canisius | L 67–87 | 8–9 (2–4) | Koessler Athletic Center (1,311); Buffalo, NY |
| 01/16/2014; 7:00 pm | at Quinnipiac | L 61–70 | 8–10 (2–5) | TD Bank Sports Center (1,005); Hamden, CT |
| 01/19/2014; 2:00 pm | Canisius | W 83–82 | 9–10 (3–5) | Multipurpose Activity Center (1,450); West Long Branch, NJ |
| 01/23/2014; 7:00 pm, ESPN3 | Fairfield | W 63–60 | 10–10 (4–5) | Multipurpose Activity Center (1,586); West Long Branch, NJ |
| 01/26/2014; 2:00 pm | at Rider | L 71–77 ^{OT} | 10–11 (4–6) | Alumni Gymnasium (1,626); Lawrenceville, NJ |
| 01/30/2014; 7:00 pm | at Marist | L 73–75 | 10–12 (4–7) | McCann Field House (1,356); Poughkeepsie, NY |
| 02/04/2014; 7:00 pm | Iona | L 71–89 | 10–13 (4–8) | Multipurpose Activity Center (1,047); West Long Branch, NJ |
| 02/07/2014; 7:00 pm, ESPN3 | at Fairfield | L 56–60 | 10–14 (4–9) | Webster Bank Arena (1,035); Bridgeport, CT |
| 02/09/2014; 2:00 pm | at Saint Peter's | L 50–61 | 10–15 (4–10) | Yanitelli Center (429); Jersey City, NJ |
| 02/14/2014; 7:00 pm | at Iona | L 70–89 | 10–16 (4–11) | Hynes Athletic Center (1,414); New Rochelle, NY |
| 02/16/2014; 2:00 pm | Marist | L 92–96 ^{2OT} | 10–17 (4–12) | Multipurpose Activity Center (2,241); West Long Branch, NJ |
| 02/19/2014; 7:00 pm | Manhattan | L 61–75 | 10–18 (4–13) | Multipurpose Activity Center (1,630); West Long Branch, NJ |
| 02/22/2014; 7:00 pm, ESPN3 | Saint Peter's | L 51–61 | 10–19 (4–14) | Multipurpose Activity Center (3,899); West Long Branch, NJ |
| 02/28/2014; 7:00 pm, ESPN3 | Niagara | W 75–50 | 11–19 (5–14) | Multipurpose Activity Center (1,475); West Long Branch, NJ |
| 03/02/2014; 2:00 pm | at Siena | L 54–70 | 11–20 (5–15) | Times Union Center (8,148); Albany, NY |
2014 MAAC tournament
| 03/06/2014; 5:00 pm | vs. Rider; First round | L 60–71 | 11–21 | MassMutual Center (1,174); Springfield, MA |
*Non-conference game. ^{#}Rankings from AP Poll. (#) Tournament seedings in parentheses. All times are in Eastern Time.
