= 2013–14 Louisville Cardinals men's basketball team =

American college basketball season

2013–2014 Louisville Cardinals men's basketball

The American tournament champions (vacated) The American regular season co-champions (vacated)

NCAA tournament, Sweet Sixteen (vacated)
- Conference: American Athletic Conference

Ranking
- Coaches: No. 9
- AP: No. 5
- Record: 0–5 (31 wins 1 loss vacated) (0–3 (15 wins vacated) The American)
- Head coach: Rick Pitino (13th season)
- Assistant coaches: Wyking Jones; Kevin Keatts; Mike Balado
- Home arena: KFC Yum! Center

2013–14 American Athletic Conference men's basketball standings
	Conf.				Overall
Team	W		L	PCT	W		L	PCT
No. 5 Louisville* †	15	–	3	.833	31	–	6	.838
No. 15 Cincinnati	15	–	3	.833	27	–	7	.794
No. 18 UConn	12	–	6	.667	32	–	8	.800
SMU	12	–	6	.667	27	–	10	.730
Memphis	12	–	6	.667	24	–	10	.706
Houston	8	–	10	.444	17	–	16	.515
Rutgers	5	–	13	.278	12	–	21	.364
UCF	4	–	14	.222	13	–	18	.419
Temple	4	–	14	.222	9	–	22	.290
South Florida	3	–	15	.167	12	–	20	.375
† The American Tournament winner As of March 15, 2014; *Louisville: 29 reg. season games, 3 postseason games vacated due to sanctions against the program; Disputed Record-(31-6)(15-3); Rankings from AP poll

The 2013–14 Louisville Cardinals men's basketball team represented the University of Louisville during the 2013–14 NCAA Division I men's basketball season, Louisville's 100th season of intercollegiate competition. The Cardinals competed in the American Athletic Conference and were coached by Rick Pitino in his 13th season. The team played its home games on Denny Crum Court at the KFC Yum! Center.

They finished 31–6, 15–3 in AAC play to win the regular season conference championship, sharing the title with Cincinnati. They were also champions of the AAC tournament to earn the conferences automatic bid to the NCAA tournament. In their 40th NCAA tournament appearance, the defending national champions defeated Manhattan and Saint Louis to advance to the Sweet Sixteen where they lost to rival Kentucky.

This was their only season in the American Athletic Conference as they moved to the Atlantic Coast Conference on July 1, 2014. Most of the games from this season along with other games from December 2010 to April 2014 were vacated as a consequence of the 2015 University of Louisville basketball sex scandal.

== Pre-season ==
The Cardinals were the #3 team in the USA Today Coaches preseason poll and picked to win American conference by the media and the coaches. The Cardinals returned 7 of 9 players from a team that won the 2013 NCAA Championship and both Big East regular season and tournament championships. The team was led by its captains, Consensus First Team All-American Russ Smith, 2013 Final Four MOP Luke Hancock and Montrezl Harrell.

=== Departures ===
Name	Number	Pos.	Height	Weight	Year	Hometown	Notes
Peyton Siva	3	PG	6'0'"	180	Senior	Seattle, Washington	Graduated – Entered the 2013 NBA draft
Mike Marra	33	SG	6'5"	200	Senior	Esmond, Rhode Island	Graduated
Gorgui Dieng	10	C	6'11"	235	Junior	Kebemer, Senegal	Graduated – Entered the 2013 NBA draft
Zach Price	25	C	6'10"	235	Sophomore	Louisville, Kentucky	Transferred to Missouri
Michael Baffour	32	PG	6'2'"	180	Senior	Lexington, Kentucky	Transferred to Benedict College

=== Class of 2013 signees ===
College recruiting
Name	Hometown	School	Height	Weight	Commit date
Terry Rozier; PG	Shaker Heights, OH	Hargrave Military Academy	6 ft 0 in (1.83 m)	165 lb (75 kg)	Nov 9, 2011
Terry Rozier; PG	Recruit ratings: Scout: Rivals: (92)				
Chris Jones; PG	Niceville, FL	INorthwest Florida State College	5 ft 10 in (1.78 m)	195 lb (88 kg)	Sep 17, 2012
Chris Jones; PG	Recruit ratings: Scout: Rivals: (94)				
Anton Gill; SG	Raleigh, NC	Hargrave Military Academy	6 ft 3 in (1.91 m)	185 lb (84 kg)	Dec 21, 2011
Anton Gill; SG	Recruit ratings: Scout: Rivals: (88)				
Akoy Agau; PF	Raleigh, NC	Omaha Central	6 ft 9 in (2.06 m)	240 lb (110 kg)	Sep 19, 2012
Akoy Agau; PF	Recruit ratings: Scout: Rivals: (85)				
Overall recruit ranking: Scout: 8 Rivals: 7 ESPN: 8
Note: In many cases, Scout, Rivals, 247Sports, On3, and ESPN may conflict in their listings of height and weight.; In these cases, the average was taken. ESPN grades are on a 100-point scale.; Sources: "Louisville Basketball Commitment List". Rivals.; "2013 Louisville Basketball Commitment List". Scout.; "ESPN". ESPN.; "Scout.com Team Recruiting Rankings". Scout.; "2013 Team Ranking". Rivals.

== Roster ==
2013–14 Louisville Cardinals men's basketball team
Players
Coaches

Pos.	#	Name	Height	Weight	Year	Previous school	Hometown
G	0	Terry Rozier	6 ft 1 in (1.85 m)	170 lb (77 kg)	Fr	Hargrave Military Academy	Cleveland, Ohio
G	1	Anton Gill	6 ft 4 in (1.93 m)	180 lb (82 kg)	Fr	Hargrave Military Academy	Raleigh, North Carolina
G	2	Russ Smith (C)	6 ft 0 in (1.83 m)	160 lb (73 kg)	Sr	Archbishop Molloy HS (NY)	Brooklyn, New York
G	3	Chris Jones	5 ft 10 in (1.78 m)	175 lb (79 kg)	Jr	Oak Ridge Military Academy; Northwest Florida State College	Memphis, Tennessee
G	4	Dillon Avare (W)	5 ft 11 in (1.8 m)	155 lb (70 kg)	Fr	Lexington Catholic	Lexington, Kentucky
G	5	Kevin Ware (redshirt)	6 ft 2 in (1.88 m)	185 lb (84 kg)	Jr	Rockdale County	Bronx, New York
F	11	Luke Hancock (C)	6 ft 6 in (1.98 m)	200 lb (91 kg)	RS Sr	Hargrave Military Academy; George Mason	Roanoke, Virginia
C	12	Mangok Mathiang	6 ft 10 in (2.08 m)	200 lb (91 kg)	RS Fr	IMG Academy (FL)	Melbourne, Australia
G	15	Tim Henderson	6 ft 2 in (1.88 m)	180 lb (82 kg)	Sr	Christian Academy	Louisville, Kentucky
G	20	Wayne Blackshear	6 ft 5 in (1.96 m)	225 lb (102 kg)	Jr	Morgan Park	Chicago, Illinois
F	22	Akoy Agau	6 ft 9 in (2.06 m)	235 lb (107 kg)	Fr	Omaha Central	Omaha, Nebraska
F	23	David Levtich (W)	6 ft 3 in (1.91 m)	190 lb (86 kg)	Fr	North Oldham (KY)	Goshen, Kentucky
F	24	Montrezl Harrell (C)	6 ft 8 in (2.03 m)	225 lb (102 kg)	So	Hargrave Military Academy (VA)	Tarboro, North Carolina
F	44	Stephan Van Treese	6 ft 9 in (2.06 m)	235 lb (107 kg)	Sr	Lawrence North	Indianapolis, Indiana

Head coach

- Rick Pitino (UMass)

Assistant coach(es)

- Wyking Jones (Loyola Marymount)
- Kevin Keatts (Ferrum)
- Mike Balado (St. Thomas)

Legend

- (C) Team captain
- (S) Suspended
- (I) Ineligible
- (W) Walk-on
- Injured
- Current redshirt

On January 10, 2014, Rick Pitino and Kevin Ware jointly announced that Ware would sit out the remainder of the season and take a medical redshirt. In Louisville's December 17 win over Missouri State, Ware was kicked in the same right leg he had severely fractured during the Cardinals' 2013 NCAA tournament win over Duke. Under NCAA rules, a player qualifies for a medical redshirt if he appears in fewer than 30 percent of his team's games, with no appearances in the second half of the season. Ware played in nine out of a total of 31 scheduled games; the Missouri State game was Louisville's 11th of the season. Shortly after the Cardinals' exit from the NCAA tournament, Ware announced that he would transfer from Louisville. On April 12, Ware confirmed to ESPN.com that his destination would be Georgia State, near his family's current Atlanta-area home.

== Regular season ==
=== Out of conference ===
Louisville opened with two exhibition victories and 2 wins at home. They played in the Hall of Fame Classic, advancing to the finals where they fell to #24 North Carolina 93–84. They finished out their non-conference slate with 5 victories, including a 79–63 win over Western Kentucky in the Billy Minardi Classic, and a loss at Rupp Arena to archrival #18 Kentucky. They entered American Athletic Conference play with an 11–2 record.

=== Departures ===
Name	Number	Pos.	Height	Weight	Year	Hometown	Notes
Chane Behanan	21	PF	6'6"	245	Junior	Cincinnati	Dismissed for violation of university policy

=== American Athletic ===
The Cardinals opened American Athletic play with road victories over UCF and Rutgers before returning home and losing to #24 Memphis. They then went 11–1 in their next 12 games, splitting a home and home with Cincinnati. They lost their second game with Memphis before closing out the season with back to back victories over #18 SMU and #19 UConn on senior day. They finished the regular season with a 26–5 (15–3) record and finished in a tie with Cincinnati as American Athletic Regular Season Champions.

Russ Smith was named to the Sporting News, Sport Illustrated and NBC Sports All-American First Teams. Russ Smith and Montrezl Harrell were named to the American Athletic Conference All-Conference First Team, and Terry Rozier was named to the American Athletic Conference All-Rookie Team.

== Post-season ==
=== American Athletic Tournament ===
By virtue of losing a coin flip the Cardinals were the #2 seed in the tournament and faced Rutgers in the quarterfinal round. They set an AAC record for margin of victory with a 61-point defeat of the Scarlet Knights, 92–31. They defeated Houston in the semi-finals 94–65. Russ Smith set an AAC scoring record and Louisville tournament scoring record with 42 points against the Cougars. The Cardinals won the AAC tournament championship game against #21 UConn by the score of 71–61. This was the Cardinals first AAC tournament championship, in their only year in the conference. Russ Smith won the AAC tournament Most Outstanding player award. Smith, Montrezl Harrell and Luke Hancock were named to the AAC All-tournament First Team.

The Cardinals have won three consecutive conference tournament championships (two in the Big East and one in the AAC).

=== NCAA tournament ===
The Cardinals earned a #4 seed in the Midwest region and defeated Manhattan in the second round by a score of 71–64. They defeated #5 seed St. Louis in the third round, but their reign as defending champs ended when the Cardinals were dethroned by #8 Kentucky 74–69 in the Sweet 16, finishing 31–6.

== Schedule ==
Date time, TV	Rank^{#}	Opponent^{#}	Result	Record	High points	High rebounds	High assists	Site (attendance) city, state
Exhibition
Oct 29*; 7:00 pm, WHAS	No. 3	Kentucky Wesleyan	W 115–67	–	20 – Harrell	9 – Rozier	4 – Jones, Rozier	KFC Yum! Center (20,288); Louisville, KY
Nov 6*; 7:00 pm, WHAS	No. 3	Pikeville	W 90–61	–	19 – Jones	9 – Mathiang	7 – Smith	KFC Yum! Center (19,227); Louisville, KY
Regular season
Nov 9*; 1:00 pm, WHAS	No. 3	Charleston	W 70–48	1–0	21 – Smith	10 – Mathiang	5 – Jones, Smith	KFC Yum! Center (20,938); Louisville, KY
Nov 12*; 7:00 pm, WHAS	No. 3	Hofstra; Hall of Fame Classic	W 97–69	2–0	30 – Smith	5 – Harrell, Rozier	7 – Jones	KFC Yum! Center (20,112); Louisville, KY
Nov 15*; 7:00 pm, WHAS	No. 3	Cornell	W 99–54	3–0	20 – Blackshear	15 – Harrell	5 – Smith	KFC Yum! Center (19,834); Louisville, KY
Nov 19*; 7:00 pm, WHAS	No. 3	Hartford; Hall of Fame Classic	W 87–48	4–0	20 – Harrell	9 – Harrell	4 – Hancock, Jones	KFC Yum! Center (20,226); Louisville, KY
Nov 23*; 2:00 pm, ESPN3	No. 3	vs. Fairfield; Hall of Fame Classic	W 71–57	5–0	15 – Jones	12 – Harrell	3 – Rozier	Mohegan Sun Arena (8,113); Uncasville, CT
Nov 24*; 1:00 pm, ESPN	No. 3	vs. No. 24 North Carolina; Hall of Fame Classic	L 84–93	5–1	36 – Smith	10 – Behanan	2 – Hancock, Smith	Mohegan Sun Arena (N/A); Uncasville, CT
Nov 29*; 7:00 pm, WHAS	No. 9	Southern Miss	W 69–38	6–1	18 – Jones	9 – Harrell	6 – Smith	KFC Yum! Center (21,416); Louisville, KY
Dec 4*; 7:00 pm, WHAS	No. 7	UMKC	W 90–62	7–1	14 – Harrell	11 – Behanan	11 – Smith	KFC Yum! Center (20,269); Louisville, KY
Dec 7*; 1:00 pm, WHAS	No. 7	Louisiana–Lafayette	W 113–74	8–1	20 – Harrell	8 – Harrell	6 – Rozier	KFC Yum! Center (20,141); Louisville, KY
Dec 14*; 12 noon, ESPN2	No. 6	WKU; Billy Minardi Classic	W 79–63	9–1	14 – Smith	10 – Rozier	10 – Smith	KFC Yum! Center (22,027); Louisville, KY
Dec 17*; 9:00 pm, ESPN2	No. 6	Missouri State	W 90–60	10–1	17 – Harrell	9 – Mathiang	8 – Smith	KFC Yum! Center (21,335); Louisville, KY
Dec 21*; 5:00 pm, FS1	No. 6	at Florida International	W 85–56	11–1	18 – Smith	7 – Mathiang	6 – Jones	U.S. Century Bank Arena (3,361); Miami, FL
Dec 28*; 4:00 pm, CBS	No. 6	at No. 18 Kentucky; Battle for the Bluegrass	L 66–73	11–2	19 – Smith	7 – Behanan	4 – Smith	Rupp Arena (24,396); Lexington, KY
Dec 31; 5:00 pm, ESPN2	No. 14	at UCF	W 90–65	12–2 (1–0)	24 – Smith	8 – Harrell	9 – Smith	CFE Arena (7,094); Orlando, FL
Jan 4; 6:00 pm, CBSSN	No. 14	at Rutgers	W 83–76	13–2 (2–0)	22 – Smith	7 – Harrell	2 – Blackshear, Jones	Rutgers Athletic Center (7,263); Piscataway, NJ
Jan 9; 7:00 pm, ESPN	No. 12	No. 24 Memphis	L 67–73	13–3 (2–1)	20 – Hancock	11 – Harrell	5 – Hancock	KFC Yum! Center (21,988); Louisville, KY
Jan 12; 2:00 pm, CBSSN	No. 12	SMU	W 71–63	14–3 (3–1)	23 – Hancock, Smith	13 – Harrell	7 – Smith	KFC Yum! Center (21,237); Louisville, KY
Jan 16; 7:00 pm, CBSSN	No. 18	Houston	W 91–52	15–3 (4–1)	23 – Blackshear	7 – Van Treese	8 – Rozier	KFC Yum! Center (21,132); Louisville, KY
Jan 18; 9:00 pm, ESPN	No. 18	at UConn; ESPN College GameDay	W 76–64	16–3 (5–1)	23 – Smith	13 – Harrell	3 – Hancock;	Gampel Pavilion (10,167); Storrs, CT
Jan 22; 7:00 pm, ESPNU	No. 12	at South Florida	W 86–74	17–3 (6–1)	16 – Blackshear	10 – Harrell	6 – Smith	USF Sun Dome (6,417); Tampa, FL
Jan 30; 7:00 pm, ESPN	No. 12	No. 13 Cincinnati	L 66–69	17–4 (6–2)	18 – Harrell	8 – Van Treese	6 – Hancock	KFC Yum! Center (22,644); Louisville, KY
Feb 1; 9:00 pm, ESPNU	No. 12	UCF	W 87–70	18–4 (7–2)	27 – Smith	7 – Harrell	5 – Hancock	KFC Yum! Center (22,201); Louisville, KY
Feb 5; 9:00 pm, ESPNU	No. 14	at Houston	W 77–62	19–4 (8–2)	17 – Smith	7 – Hancock	6 – Smith	Hofheinz Pavilion (7,247); Houston, TX
Feb 13; 7:00 pm, ESPN	No. 13	at Temple	W 82–58	20–4 (9–2)	22 – Harrell	10 – Harrell	5 – Jones	Liacouras Center (6,566); Philadelphia, PA
Feb 16; 6:00 pm, ESPN2	No. 13	Rutgers	W 102–54	21–4 (10–2)	25 – Hancock	9 – Harrell	5 – Smith	KFC Yum! Center (21,821); Louisville, KY
Feb 18; 7:00 pm, CBSSN	No. 11	South Florida	W 80–54	22–4 (11–2)	19 – Smith	8 – Van Treese	3 – Hancock, Jones	KFC Yum! Center (21,655); Louisville, KY
Feb 22; 12 noon, CBS	No. 11	at No. 7 Cincinnati	W 58–57	23–4 (12–2)	21 – Harrell	10 – Harrell	5 – Smith	Fifth Third Arena (13,176); Cincinnati, OH
Feb 27; 9:00 pm, ESPN	No. 7	Temple	W 88–66	24–4 (12–2)	24 – Smith	6 – Blackshear, Harrell, Van Treese	8 – Jones	KFC Yum! Center (21,312); Louisville, KY
Mar 1; 2:00 pm, CBS	No. 7	at No. 21 Memphis	L 66–72	24–5 (12–3)	25 – Harrell	12 – Harrell	5 – Smith	FedEx Forum (18,375); Memphis, TN
Mar 5; 7:00 pm, CBSSN	No. 11	at No. 18 SMU	W 84–71	25–5 (13–3)	26 – Smith	8 – Harrell	5 – Smith	Moody Coliseum (7,305); Dallas, TX
Mar 8; 2:00 pm, CBS	No. 11	No. 19 UConn; Senior Day	W 81–48	26–5 (15–3)	20 – Harrell	13 – Van Treese	13 – Smith	KFC Yum! Center (22,782); Louisville, KY
American Athletic Conference tournament
Mar 13; 3:00 pm, ESPNU	No. 5	vs. Rutgers; Quarterfinals	W 92–31	27–5	18 – Jones	10 – Van Treese	5 – Smith	FedEx Forum (13,011); Memphis, TN
Mar 14; 7:00 pm, ESPN2	No. 5	vs. Houston; Semifinals	W 94–65	28–5	42 – Smith	10 – Van Treese	8 – Jones	FedEx Forum (11,888); Memphis, TN
Mar 15; 6:00 pm, ESPN2	No. 5	vs. No. 21 UConn; Championship	W 71–61	29–5	22 – Harrell	11 – Harrell	3 – Smith, Van Treese	FedEx Forum (13,554); Memphis, TN
NCAA tournament
Mar 20*; 9:45 pm, TNT	No. 5 (4 MW)	vs. (13 MW) Manhattan; Second round	W 71–64	30–5	18 – Smith	13 – Harrell	4 – Hancock	Amway Center (14,866); Orlando, FL
Mar 22*; 2:45 pm, CBS	No. 5 (4 MW)	vs. No. 25 (5 MW) Saint Louis; Third round	W 66–51	31–5	21 – Hancock	11 – Harrell	11 – Smith	Amway Center (18,512); Orlando, FL
Mar 28*; 9:45 pm, CBS	No. 5 (4 MW)	vs. (8 MW) Kentucky; Sweet Sixteen	L 69–74	31–6	23 – Smith	8 – Harrell	3 – Smith	Lucas Oil Stadium (41,072); Indianapolis, IN
*Non-conference game. ^{#}Rankings from AP Poll. (#) Tournament seedings in parentheses. All times are in Eastern Time. (#) during NCAA tournament is seed within region MW=Midwest.

== Rankings ==
Ranking movement Legend: ██ Increase in ranking. ██ Decrease in ranking. ██ Not ranked the previous week.
Poll	Pre	Wk 2	Wk 3	Wk 4	Wk 5	Wk 6	Wk 7	Wk 8	Wk 9	Wk 10	Wk 11	Wk 12	Wk 13	Wk 14	Wk 15	Wk 16	Wk 17	Wk 18	Wk 19	Wk 20	Final
AP	3	3	3	9	7	6	6	6	14	12	18	12	12	14	13	11т	7	11	5	5	N/A
Coaches	3	3	2	9	6	4	4	4	10	8	14	9	7т	10	8	5	4	9	5	3	9

== Awards ==
AP First Team All-American
Russ Smith
USBWA First Team All-America
Russ Smith
Sporting News First Team All-America
Russ Smith
NABC Second Team All-America
Russ Smith
John R. Wooden Award All-American
Russ Smith
NBC Sports First Team All-America
Russ Smith
Sports Illustrated First Team All-America
Russ Smith
Frances Pomeroy Naismith Award (top Division I senior 6'0"/1.83 m or shorter)
Russ Smith
USBWA District IV Player of the Year
Russ Smith
American Athletic Conference All-Conference First Team
Russ Smith
Montrezl Harrell
American Athletic Conference All-Rookie Team
Terry Rozier
USBWA District IV All-District Team
Russ Smith
Montrezl Harrell

== Notable achievements ==
- Luke Hancock scored the 1000th point of his college career (at George Mason and Louisville) in a 113–74 victory over LA-Lafayette on December 7, 2013.
- The team set the KFC YUM! Center single game scoring record with a 113–74 victory over LA-Lafayette on December 7, 2013.
- Montrezl Harrell broke the single season record for dunks that was previously held by Pervis Ellison.
- Russ Smith set the school record for most points in a half previously held by Larry O'Bannon, Charlie Tyra and Butch Beard (26) with 27 in the first half against Houston on March 14, 2014.
- Russ Smith set the school record for most points in a conference tournament game with 42 against Houston on March 14, 2014. The previous record was 31 by Milt Wagner.
- Russ Smith set the AAC record for most points in a game with 42 against Houston on March 14, 2014.
- Russ Smith broke the school record for most steals in a career with 257, previously held by Peyton Siva (254).
- Russ Smith broke the school record for most career points in the NCAA tournament, breaking a record previously held by Milt Wagner.
