= 2013–14 Fairfield Stags men's basketball team =

American college basketball season

2013–14 Fairfield Stags men's basketball
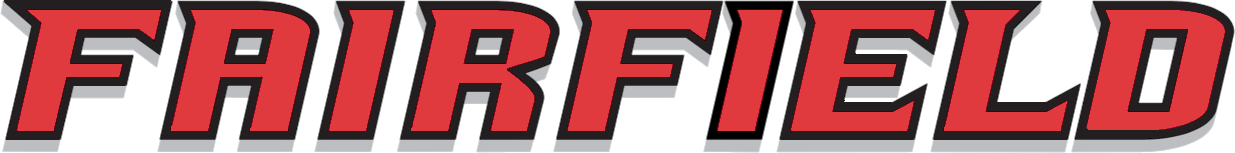
- Conference: Metro Atlantic Athletic Conference
- Record: 7–25 (4–16 MAAC)
- Head coach: Sydney Johnson (3rd season)
- Assistant coaches: Tony Newsom; Tyson Wheeler; Martin Bahar
- Home arena: Webster Bank Arena

2013–14 MAAC men's basketball standings
	Conf.				Overall
Team	W		L	PCT	W		L	PCT
Iona	17	–	3	.850	22	–	11	.667
Manhattan †	15	–	5	.750	25	–	8	.758
Quinnipiac	14	–	6	.700	20	–	12	.625
Canisius	14	–	6	.700	21	–	13	.618
Siena	11	–	9	.550	20	–	18	.526
Saint Peter's	9	–	11	.450	14	–	17	.452
Rider	9	–	11	.450	14	–	17	.452
Marist	9	–	11	.450	12	–	19	.387
Monmouth	5	–	15	.250	11	–	21	.344
Fairfield	4	–	16	.200	7	–	25	.219
Niagara	3	–	17	.150	7	–	26	.212
† 2014 MAAC tournament winner

The 2013–14 Fairfield Stags men's basketball team represented Fairfield University during the 2013–14 NCAA Division I men's basketball season. The Stags, led by third year head coach Sydney Johnson, played their home games at Webster Bank Arena and were members of the Metro Atlantic Athletic Conference. They finished the season 7–25, 4–16 in MAAC play to finish in tenth place. They lost in the first round of the MAAC tournament to Saint Peter's.

== Roster ==
Number	Name	Position	Height	Weight	Year	Hometown
0	Justin Jenkins	Guard	6–2	175	Sophomore	The Bronx, New York
5	Lincoln Davis	Guard	6–3	170	Freshman	Pittsburgh, PA
14	Marcus Gilbert	Forward	6–6	185	Sophomore	Smyrna, Delaware
15	Maurice Barrow	Forward	6–5	210	Senior	Hollis, New York
20	K.J. Rose	Guard	6–1	190	Freshman	Binghamton, New York
21	Amadou Sidibe	Forward	6–8	215	Sophomore	The Bronx, New York
23	Steve Johnston	Guard	6–0	170	Junior	Stamford, Connecticut
24	Doug Chappell	Guard	6–2	175	Freshman	Alexandria, Virginia
25	Steve Smith	Forward	6–8	190	Freshman	Gwynedd Valley, Pennsylvania
35	Coleman Johnson	Forward	6–6	215	Sophomore	Oak Hill, Virginia
44	Malcolm Gilbert	Center	6–11	235	Junior	Smyrna, Delaware
55	Sean Grennan	Guard	6–3	175	Junior	Toms River, New Jersey

== Schedule ==
Date time, TV	Opponent	Result	Record	Site (attendance) city, state
Exhibition
11/01/2013*; 7:00 pm	Bridgeport	L 59–63		Webster Bank Arena (1,984); Bridgeport, CT
Regular season
11/09/2013*; 8:00 pm	Sacred Heart; Connecticut 6 Classic	W 67–54	1–0	Webster Bank Arena (5,060); Bridgeport, CT
11/13/2013*; 7:00 pm	Hartford; Hall of Fame Tip Off	L 53–63	1–1	Webster Bank Arena (1,309); Bridgeport, CT
11/16/2013*; 8:00 pm, MASN	at Loyola (MD)	L 52–59	1–2	Reitz Arena (2,007); Baltimore, MD
11/20/2013*; 7:00 pm	Holy Cross; Hall of Fame Tip Off	L 49–63	1–3	Webster Bank Arena (1,052); Bridgeport, CT
11/23/2013*; 2:00 pm	vs. No. 3 Louisville; Hall of Fame Tip Off	L 57–71	1–4	Mohegan Sun Arena (8,113); Uncasville, CT
11/24/2013*; 3:45 pm	vs. Richmond; Hall of Fame Tip Off	L 47–68	1–5	Mohegan Sun Arena (8,113); Uncasville, CT
11/29/2013*; 12:30 pm, FS1	at Providence	L 69–78	1–6	Dunkin' Donuts Center (7,769); Prividence, RI
12/06/2013; 8:30 pm, ESPN3	at Quinnipiac	L 79–83	1–7 (0–1)	TD Bank Sports Center (2,410); Hamden, CT
12/08/2013; 1:30 pm	Iona	L 72–83	1–8 (0–2)	Webster Bank Arena (1,407); Bridgeport, CT
12/11/2013*; 8:00 pm	at Belmont			Curb Event Center; Nashville, TN
12/15/2013*; 1:00 pm, SNY	Northeastern	W 64–60	2–8	Webster Bank Arena (1,106); Bridgeport, CT
12/21/2013*; 2:00 pm	at Green Bay	L 58–74	2–9	Resch Center (2,830); Green Bay, WI
12/28/2013*; 2:00 pm	at Bucknell	W 73–64	3–9	Sojka Pavilion (3,016); Lewisburg, PA
01/02/2014; 7:00 pm	at Marist	L 56–75	3–10 (0–3)	McCann Field House (830); Poughkeepsie, NY
01/04/2014; 7:00 pm	at Manhattan	L 57–83	3–11 (0–4)	Draddy Gymnasium (1,712); Riverdale, NY
01/08/2014; 7:00 pm	Saint Peter's	L 55–56	3–12 (0–5)	Webster Bank Arena (1,240); Bridgeport, CT
01/10/2014; 7:00 pm	at Iona	L 75–84	3–13 (0–6)	Hynes Athletic Center (1,507); New Rochelle, NY
01/16/2014; 8:30 pm, ESPN3	Niagara	L 63–67	3–14 (0–7)	Webster Bank Arena (1,625); Bridgeport, CT
01/18/2014; 1:30 pm, SNY	Manhattan	W 71–67	4–14 (1–7)	Webster Bank Arena (2,135); Bridgeport, CT
01/20/2014*; 3:30 pm	at Belmont	L 53–62	4–15	Curb Event Center (1,582); Nashville, TN
01/23/2014; 7:00 pm	at Monmouth	L 60–63	4–16 (1–8)	Multipurpose Activity Center (1,586); West Long Branch, NJ
01/26/2014; 12:00 pm	Siena	L 56–64	4–17 (1–9)	Webster Bank Arena (2,051); Bridgeport, CT
02/01/2014; 7:00 pm	Canisius	L 58–84	4–18 (1–10)	Webster Bank Arena (1,503); Bridgeport, CT
02/03/2014; 7:00 pm	at Rider	L 65–73	4–19 (1–11)	Alumni Gymnasium (1,103); Lawrenceville, NJ
02/07/2014; 7:00 pm, ESPN3	Monmouth	W 60–56	5–19 (2–11)	Webster Bank Arena (1,035); Bridgeport, CT
02/10/2014; 7:00 pm	at Siena	L 75–77	5–20 (2–12)	Times Union Center (5,536); Albany, NY
02/13/2014; 8:30 pm, ESPN3	Quinnipiac	L 72–80	5–21 (2–13)	Webster Bank Arena (504); Bridgeport, CT
02/15/2014; 4:00 pm	Rider	L 62–71	5–22 (2–14)	Webster Bank Arena (1,427); Bridgeport, CT
02/20/2014; 7:00 pm	at Niagara	W 72–66	6–22 (3–14)	Gallagher Center (1,170); Lewiston, NY
02/22/2014; 2:00 pm	at Canisius	L 78–90	6–23 (3–15)	Koessler Athletic Center (1,909); Buffalo, NY
02/25/2014; 7:00 pm	at Saint Peter's	L 62–63	6–24 (3–16)	Yanitelli Center (387); Jersey City, NJ
02/28/2014; 7:00 pm	Marist	W 78–74	7–24 (4–16)	Webster Bank Arena (2,393); Bridgeport, CT
2014 MAAC tournament
03/06/2014; 7:22 pm	vs. Saint Peter's; First round	L 62–65 ^{OT}	7–25	MassMutual Center (1,174); Springfield, MA
*Non-conference game. ^{#}Rankings from AP Poll. (#) Tournament seedings in parentheses. All times are in Eastern Time.

* The December 11 game was postponed after Fairfield's flight to Nashville was cancelled to due inclement weather. The game was rescheduled for January 20.
