= Steve Masiello =

American basketball coach (born 1977)

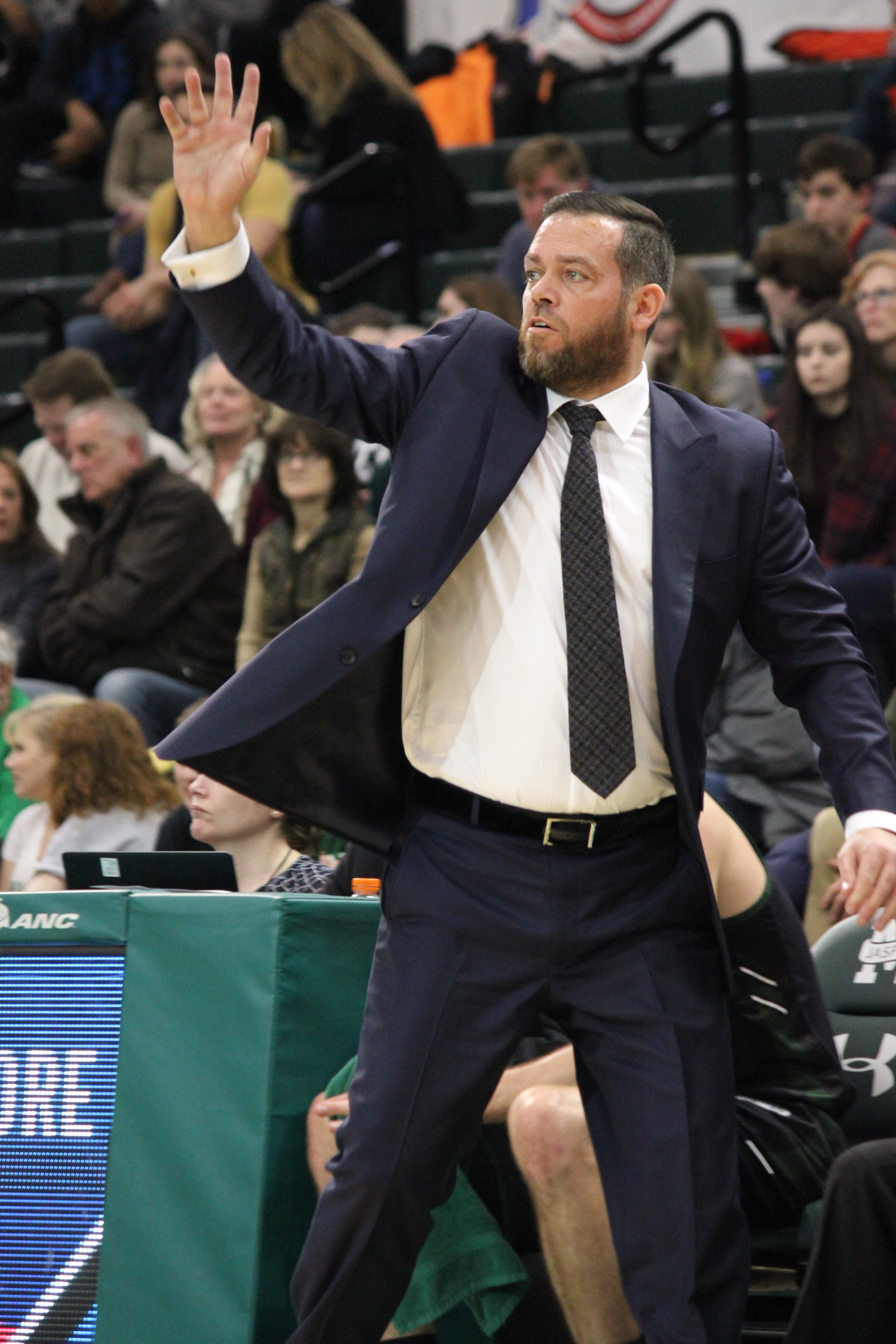

Current position
- Title: Associate head coach
- Team: St. John's
- Conference: Big East

Biographical details
- Born: September 2, 1977 (age 49)

Playing career
- 1996–2000: Kentucky
- Position: Guard

Coaching career (HC unless noted)
- 2001–2005: Manhattan (assistant)
- 2005–2011: Louisville (assistant)
- 2011–2022: Manhattan
- 2023–present: St. John's (associate HC)

Administrative career (AD unless noted)
- 2000–2001: Tulane (admin. asst.)
- 2022–2023: Iona (dir. operations)

Head coaching record
- Overall: 162–177
- Tournaments: 0–2 (NCAA Division I); 1–1 (CIT)

Accomplishments and honors

Championships
- 2 MAAC tournament (2014, 2015)

Stephen John Masiello Jr. (born September 2, 1977) is an American college basketball coach and a former player. He is currently the associate head coach at St. John's.

Masiello is a native of White Plains, New York. He graduated from Iona Grammar School in 1991 and attended Archbishop Stepinac High School for two years before transferring to the Harvey School in Katonah, New York. Masiello played collegiately as a walk-on at Kentucky for coaches Rick Pitino and Tubby Smith from 1996 to 2000. Though he rarely played, he was a member of two Final Four teams, including the 1997–98 Wildcats team that won the national championship. Masiello left Kentucky without completing his college degree in communications, despite information to the contrary on his Manhattan College and Louisville website bios.

Following the close of his college career, Masiello got his first coaching job as an administrative assistant at Tulane during the 2000–01 season. Following a stint as an assistant at Manhattan, he got an opportunity to rejoin his old coach Pitino at Louisville. Masiello served on Pitino's staff for six years, gaining a reputation as a top assistant coach and strong recruiter.

== Manhattan ==
On April 11, 2011, Masiello was named the 24th head basketball coach at Manhattan College.

On March 25, 2014, Masiello agreed to a deal to become the next head coach at South Florida. However, South Florida later rescinded their offer after it was reported that he had not graduated from the University of Kentucky, as his résumé had stated. Masiello was subsequently placed on leave by Manhattan. It was announced on April 7, 2014, that Masiello will be retained as Manhattan head coach, but is on permanent leave until he gets his undergraduate degree. On May 29, 2014, the University of Kentucky announced that Masiello had completed his required coursework and would receive a degree that August.

Masiello was relieved of duty in October 2022 just weeks before the start of the season. Afterward, Masiello was hired as director of operations for Iona under former Louisville and then Iona head basketball coach, Rick Pitino.

== Head coaching record ==
Record table
Season	Team	Overall	Conference	Standing	Postseason
Manhattan Jaspers (Metro Atlantic Athletic Conference) (2011–2022)
2011–12	Manhattan	21–13	12–6	T–3rd	CIT second round
2012–13	Manhattan	14–18	9–9	T–6th	
2013–14	Manhattan	25–8	15–5	2nd	NCAA Division I Round of 64
2014–15	Manhattan	19–14	13–7	T–3rd	NCAA Division I First Four
2015–16	Manhattan	13–18	9–11	6th	
2016–17	Manhattan	10–22	5–15	T–10th	
2017–18	Manhattan	14–17	9–9	T–5th	
2018–19	Manhattan	11–21	8–10	7th	
2019–20	Manhattan	13–18	8–12	T–8th	
2020–21	Manhattan	7–13	6–12	10th	
2021–22	Manhattan	15–15	8–12	T–7th	
Manhattan:		162–177 (.478)	105–111 (.486)		
Total:		162–177 (.478)			
National champion Postseason invitational champion Conference regular season champion Conference regular season and conference tournament champion Division regular season champion Division regular season and conference tournament champion Conference tournament champion
