= 2013–14 Quinnipiac Bobcats men's basketball team =

American college basketball season

2013–14 Quinnipiac Bobcats men's basketball
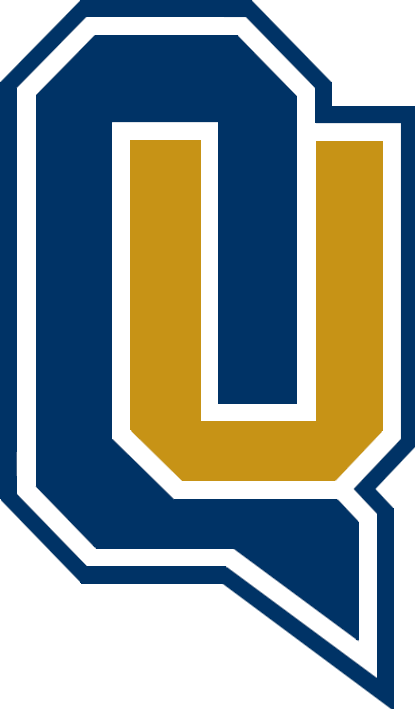

CIT, First round
- Conference: Metro Atlantic Athletic Conference
- Record: 20–12 (14–6 MAAC)
- Head coach: Tom Moore (7th season)
- Assistant coaches: Sean Doherty; Eric Eaton; Scott Burrell
- Home arena: TD Bank Sports Center

2013–14 MAAC men's basketball standings
	Conf.				Overall
Team	W		L	PCT	W		L	PCT
Iona	17	–	3	.850	22	–	11	.667
Manhattan †	15	–	5	.750	25	–	8	.758
Quinnipiac	14	–	6	.700	20	–	12	.625
Canisius	14	–	6	.700	21	–	13	.618
Siena	11	–	9	.550	20	–	18	.526
Saint Peter's	9	–	11	.450	14	–	17	.452
Rider	9	–	11	.450	14	–	17	.452
Marist	9	–	11	.450	12	–	19	.387
Monmouth	5	–	15	.250	11	–	21	.344
Fairfield	4	–	16	.200	7	–	25	.219
Niagara	3	–	17	.150	7	–	26	.212
† 2014 MAAC tournament winner

The 2013–14 Quinnipiac Bobcats men's basketball team represented Quinnipiac University during the 2013–14 NCAA Division I men's basketball season. The Bobcats, led by seventh year head coach Tom Moore, played their home games at the TD Bank Sports Center and were first year members of the Metro Atlantic Athletic Conference. They finished the season 20–12, 14–6 in MAAC play to finish in a tie for third place. They advanced to the semifinals of the MAAC tournament where they lost to Manhattan. They were invited to the collegeInsider.com Tournament where they lost in the first round to Yale.

== Roster ==
2013–14 Quinnipiac Bobcats men's basketball team
Players
Coaches

Pos.	#	Name	Height	Weight	Year	Previous school	Hometown
G	0	Umar Shannon	5 ft 11 in (1.8 m)	185 lb (84 kg)	GS	Atlantic City (St. Francis (PA))	Atlantic City, New Jersey
G	1	Zaid Hearst	6 ft 4 in (1.93 m)	215 lb (98 kg)	Jr	Salisbury (CT) School	Bethesda, Maryland
G	2	Kasim Chandler	5 ft 10 in (1.78 m)	160 lb (73 kg)	Fr	Imani Christian Academy/Eastside	Newark, New Jersey
G	3	Kendrick Ray	6 ft 1 in (1.85 m)	180 lb (82 kg)	So	Middletown	Middletown, New York
F	4	Ike Azotam	6 ft 7 in (2.01 m)	231 lb (105 kg)	Sr	O'Bryant School/Marianapolis Prep	Boston, Massachusetts
G	5	Shaq Shannon	6 ft 1 in (1.85 m)	176 lb (80 kg)	Sr	Communications Tech	Philadelphia, Pennsylvania
F	10	Alain Chigha	6 ft 7 in (2.01 m)	180 lb (82 kg)	Fr	Rock School	Gainesville, Florida
F	11	A.J. Sumbry	6 ft 8 in (2.03 m)	243 lb (110 kg)	Fr	St. Benedict's Prep	East Windsor, New Jersey
F	12	Marquis Barnett	6 ft 8 in (2.03 m)	243 lb (110 kg)	Jr	Benjamin N. Cardozo	Bronx, New York
G	13	Emanuel Binyam	6 ft 1 in (1.85 m)	175 lb (79 kg)	Jr	Mountain Mission	Rockville, Maryland
G	15	Samir Kalil	6 ft 0 in (1.83 m)	170 lb (77 kg)	So	Archbishop Stepinac	Mount Vernon, New York
G	21	Evan Conti	6 ft 3 in (1.91 m)	200 lb (91 kg)	Jr	Holy Cross	Bayside, New York
F	22	Justin Harris	6 ft 8 in (2.03 m)	265 lb (120 kg)	Jr	Paramus Catholic	Paterson, New Jersey
F	23	Ousmane Drame	6 ft 9 in (2.06 m)	240 lb (109 kg)	Jr	New Mission/Marianapolis Prep	Boston, Massachusetts
G	25	T'ziah Wood-Smith	6 ft 4 in (1.93 m)	190 lb (86 kg)	Jr	Baldwin (NY)	Baldwin, New York
G	30	James Ford, Jr.	6 ft 4 in (1.93 m)	185 lb (84 kg)	So	Quality Education Academy	Hopewell, Virginia

Head coach

- Tom Moore (Boston University, 7th yr., 1987)

Assistant coach(es)

- Sean Doherty (Worcester State, 18th yr., 1992)
- Eric Eaton (UMass Dartmouth, 14th yr., 1997)
- Scott Burrell (Connecticut, 7th yr., 2010)

Legend

- (C) Team captain
- (S) Suspended
- (I) Ineligible
- (W) Walk-on
- Injured
- Current redshirt

Roster
Last update: 2013-11-24

== Schedule ==
Date time, TV	Opponent	Result	Record	Site (attendance) city, state
Regular season
11/09/2013*; 3:00 pm	vs. Hartford; Connecticut 6 Classic	W 82–77	1–0	Webster Bank Arena (5,060); Bridgeport, CT
11/12/2013*; 9:00 am, ESPN2	at La Salle; ESPN College Tip-Off Marathon	L 67–73	1–1	Tom Gola Arena (3,229); Philadelphia, PA
11/16/2013*; 2:00 pm	Albany	W 79–69	2–1	TD Bank Sports Center (1,885); Hamden, CT
11/20/2013*; 7:00 pm	Hampton	W 71–68	3–1	TD Bank Sports Center (1,009); Hamden, CT
11/25/2013*; 7:00 pm	at Maine	W 102–61	4–1	Cross Insurance Center (1,045); Bangor, ME
12/02/2013*; 7:00 pm, NESN	Boston University	L 66–69	4–2	TD Bank Sports Center (1,003); Hamden, CT
12/06/2013; 8:30 pm, ESPN3	Fairfield	W 83–79	5–2 (1–0)	TD Bank Sports Center (2,410); Hamden, CT
12/08/2013; 2:00 pm	at Rider	L 78–90	5–3 (1–1)	Alumni Gymnasium (1,414); Lawrenceville, NJ
12/15/2013*; 2:00 pm	at Vermont	W 80–67	6–3	Patrick Gym (2,018); Burlington, VT
12/21/2013*; 7:00 pm	at Lehigh	L 58–69	6–4	Stabler Arena (1,126); Bethlehem, PA
12/29/2013*; 11:00 pm, P12N	at Oregon State	L 68–76	6–5	Gill Coliseum (3,297); Corvallis, OR
01/04/2014; 3:00 pm	at Monmouth	W 94–77	7–5 (2–1)	Multipurpose Activity Center (1,421); West Long Branch, NJ
01/06/2014; 7:00 pm, SNY	Iona	W 86–74	8–5 (3–1)	TD Bank Sports Center (1,230); Hamden, CT
01/09/2014; 7:00 pm, SNY	Manhattan	W 81–76	9–5 (4–1)	TD Bank Sports Center (2,038); Hamden, CT
01/12/2014; 2:30 pm	at Saint Peter's	L 67–74	9–6 (4–2)	Yanitelli Center (408); Jersey City, NJ
01/16/2014; 7:00 pm	Monmouth	W 70–61	10–6 (5–2)	TD Bank Sports Center (1,005); Hamden, CT
01/18/2014; 4:00 pm	Niagara	W 85–71	11–6 (6–2)	TD Bank Sports Center (2,589); Hamden, CT
01/24/2014; 7:00 pm, ESPN3	at Iona	L 73–95	11–7 (6–3)	Hynes Athletic Center (1,823); New Rochelle, NY
01/26/2014; 2:00 pm	at Manhattan	W 90–86 ^{OT}	12–7 (7–3)	Draddy Gymnasium (2,254); Riverdale, NY
01/30/2014; 7:30 pm, SNY	Canisius	L 74–86	12–8 (7–4)	TD Bank Sports Center (N/A); Hamden, CT
02/01/2014; 7:00 pm	at Siena	W 103–95 ^{OT}	13–8 (8–4)	Times Union Center (6,415); Albany, NY
02/08/2014; 2:00 pm	Rider	W 82–61	14–8 (9–4)	TD Bank Sports Center (2,868); Hamden, CT
02/10/2014; 7:00 pm	Marist	W 83–78	15–8 (10–4)	TD Bank Sports Center (1,204); Hamden, CT
02/13/2014; 8:30 pm, ESPN3	at Fairfield	W 80–72	16–8 (11–4)	Webster Bank Arena (504); Bridgeport, CT
02/16/2014; 4:00 pm	Saint Peter's	W 74–64	17–8 (12–4)	TD Bank Sports Center (2,524); Hamden, CT
02/20/2014; 7:00 pm	at Canisius	W 88–81	18–8 (13–4)	Koessler Athletic Center (2,196); Buffalo, NY
02/22/2014; 3:00 pm	at Niagara	W 90–88	19–8 (14–4)	Gallagher Center (1,766); Lewiston, NY
02/27/2014; 8:30 pm, ESPN3	Siena	L 70–72	19–9 (14–5)	TD Bank Sports Center (2,306); Hamden, CT
03/02/2014; 2:00 pm	at Marist	L 72–103	19–10 (14–6)	McCann Field House (1,621); Poughkeepsie, NY
MAAC tournament
03/08/2013; 9:00 pm, ESPN3	vs. Niagara; Quarterfinals	W 89–80	20–10	MassMutual Center (1,645); Springfield, MA
03/09/2013; 7:00 pm, ESPN3	vs. Manhattan; Semifinals	L 68–87	20–11	MassMutual Center (N/A); Springfield, MA
CIT
03/19/2014*; 7:00 pm	at Yale; First round	L 68–69	20–12	John J. Lee Amphitheater (922); New Haven, CT
*Non-conference game. ^{#}Rankings from AP Poll. (#) Tournament seedings in parentheses. All times are in Eastern Time.
