= 2013–14 Siena Saints men's basketball team =

American college basketball season

2013–14 Siena Saints men's basketball

College Basketball Invitational champions

CBI Finals vs. Fresno State, W 2–1
- Conference: Metro Atlantic Athletic Conference
- Record: 20–18 (11–9 MAAC)
- Head coach: Jimmy Patsos (1st season)
- Assistant coaches: Greg Manning; Luke D'Alessio; Lucious Jordan
- Home arena: Times Union Center; Alumni Recreation Center

2013–14 MAAC men's basketball standings
	Conf.				Overall
Team	W		L	PCT	W		L	PCT
Iona	17	–	3	.850	22	–	11	.667
Manhattan †	15	–	5	.750	25	–	8	.758
Quinnipiac	14	–	6	.700	20	–	12	.625
Canisius	14	–	6	.700	21	–	13	.618
Siena	11	–	9	.550	20	–	18	.526
Saint Peter's	9	–	11	.450	14	–	17	.452
Rider	9	–	11	.450	14	–	17	.452
Marist	9	–	11	.450	12	–	19	.387
Monmouth	5	–	15	.250	11	–	21	.344
Fairfield	4	–	16	.200	7	–	25	.219
Niagara	3	–	17	.150	7	–	26	.212
† 2014 MAAC tournament winner

The 2013–14 Siena Saints men's basketball team represented Siena College during the 2013–14 NCAA Division I men's basketball season. The Saints, led by first year head coach Jimmy Patsos, played their home games at the Times Union Center, with some exhibition and postseason games at Alumni Recreation Center, and were members of the Metro Atlantic Athletic Conference. They finished the season 20–18, 11–9 in MAAC play to finish in fifth place. They lost in the quarterfinals of the MAAC tournament to Canisius. They were invited to the College Basketball Invitational where they defeated Stony Brook, Penn State and Illinois State to advance to the best-of-3 finals vs Fresno State. In the finals, they defeated Fresno State 2 games to 1 to be crowned 2014 CBI champions.

== Roster ==
2013–14 Siena Saints men's basketball team
Players
Coaches

Pos.	#	Name	Height	Weight	Year	Previous school	Hometown
G	0	Rich Audu	6 ft 3 in (1.91 m)	191 lb (87 kg)	So	Regional Elite Dev. Academy	Mississauga, Ontario
G	1	Marquis Wright	6 ft 0 in (1.83 m)	159 lb (72 kg)	Fr	North Point	Waldorf, Maryland
F	2	Javion Ogunyemi	6 ft 8 in (2.03 m)	230 lb (104 kg)	Fr	Troy	Troy, New York
G	3	Ryan Oliver	6 ft 3 in (1.91 m)	195 lb (88 kg)	So	Northfield Mount Hermon (MA)	Inglewood, California
G	5	Evan Hymes	5 ft 8 in (1.73 m)	155 lb (70 kg)	Jr	Kestrel Hts. Charter Academy	Durham, North Carolina
G	11	Steven Cruz	5 ft 8 in (1.73 m)	175 lb (79 kg)	Sr	LaSalle Academy	New York, New York
G	12	Mike Wilson	6 ft 0 in (1.83 m)	146 lb (66 kg)	Fr	Eastern	Voorhees, New Jersey
F	15	Marcus Hopper	6 ft 7 in (2.01 m)	248 lb (112 kg)	Jr	Holy Cross	Queens, New York
F	20	Jimmy Merrill	6 ft 9 in (2.06 m)	207 lb (94 kg)	Fr	Columbia	Rensselaer, New York
G	23	Maurice White	6 ft 3 in (1.91 m)	197 lb (89 kg)	Fr	St. Frances Academy	Baltimore, Maryland
G/F	24	Lavon Long	6 ft 6 in (1.98 m)	234 lb (106 kg)	Fr	Oakland Mills	Columbia, Maryland
F	25	Michael Wolfe	6 ft 9 in (2.06 m)	200 lb (91 kg)	Fr	Georgetown Prep	Germantown, Maryland
F	31	Brett Bisping	6 ft 8 in (2.03 m)	233 lb (106 kg)	So	Morton	Peoria, Illinois
G	32	Patrick Cole	6 ft 5 in (1.96 m)	218 lb (99 kg)	So	Newark Central	Newark, New Jersey
G	33	Rob Poole	6 ft 5 in (1.96 m)	191 lb (87 kg)	Jr	Paul VI	Cherry Hill, New Jersey
C	34	Imoh Silas	6 ft 8 in (2.03 m)	223 lb (101 kg)	Jr	Holderness School	Lagos, Nigeria

Head coach

- Jimmy Patsos, 1st yr. (Catholic, 1989)

Assistant coach(es)

- Greg Manning, 1st yr. (Loyola (MD), 2008)
- Luke D'Alessio, 1st yr. (Catholic, 1983)
- Lucious Jordan, 1st yr. (Albany, 2006)

Legend

- (C) Team captain
- (S) Suspended
- (I) Ineligible
- (W) Walk-on
- Injured
- Current redshirt

Roster
Last update: November 7, 2013

== Schedule ==
Date time, TV	Opponent	Result	Record	High points	High rebounds	High assists	Site (attendance) city, state
Exhibition
11/02/2013*; 7:00 pm	NJCU	W 88–56		16 – Hymes, Poole	8 – Poole	8 – Wright	Alumni Recreation Center (1,069); Loudonville, NY
Regular season
11/08/2013*; 7:00 pm	Albany; Albany Cup	L 62–74	0–1	17 – White	11 – Silas	6 – Wright	Times Union Center (11,311); Albany, NY
11/12/2013*; 7:00 pm	at Vermont	L 66–77	0–2	22 – Poole	6 – Long, Poole	6 – Wright	Patrick Gym (2,212); Burlington, Vermont
11/16/2013*; 3:00 pm	at La Salle	L 74–78	0–3	21 – Poole	9 – Long	5 – Hymes	Tom Gola Arena (3,400); Philadelphia, PA
11/19/2013*; 7:00 pm, TWCS NY	St. Bonaventure; Franciscan Cup	W 72–70	1–3	15 – Long	7 – Bisping	7 – Wright	Times Union Center (5,654); Albany, NY
11/22/2013*; 7:00 pm	at Cornell	W 71–70	2–3	19 – Poole	14 – Silas	4 – Wright	Newman Arena (1,471); Ithaca, NY
11/24/2013*; 12:00 pm, BTN	at Purdue	L 73–81	2–4	16 – Bisping	11 – Poole	5 – Hymes, Wright	Mackey Arena (12,898); West Lafayette, IN
11/28/2013*; 6:30 pm, ESPN2	vs. No. 21 Memphis; Old Spice Classic First Round	L 60–87	2–5	11 – Bisping	12 – Bisping	5 – Hymes	HP Field House (2,351); Orlando, FL
11/29/2013*; 8:00 pm, ESPNU	vs. Saint Joseph's; Old Spice Classic	L 66–78	2–6	13 – Long	7 – Poole	6 – Wright	HP Field House (2,612); Orlando, FL
12/01/2013*; 5:00 pm, ESPN3	vs. Purdue; Old Spice Classic	L 63–68	2–7	17 – Hymes, Poole	8 – Bisping	5 – Wright	HP Field House (3,633); Orlando, FL
12/06/2013; 7:00 pm, TWCS NY	at Niagara	W 84–71	3–7 (1–0)	21 – Poole	8 – Poole	10 – Wright	Gallagher Center (1,442); Lewiston, NY
12/08/2013; 2:00 pm	at Canisius	L 78–93	3–8 (1–1)	17 – Bisping	9 – Bisping	12 – Wright	Koessler Athletic Center (1,555); Buffalo, NY
12/23/2013*; 7:00 pm, TWCS NY	Hofstra	W 67–59	4–8	14 – Long, White, Wright	8 – White	4 – Hymes	Times Union Center (5,941); Albany, NY
12/30/2013*; 7:00 pm, TWCS NY	Fordham	W 79–69	5–8	28 – Poole	9 – Long	5 – Wright	Times Union Center (6,131); Albany, NY
01/02/2014; 7:00 pm	at Monmouth	L 59–63	5–9 (1–2)	21 – Poole	9 – Poole	5 – Wright	Multipurpose Activity Center (825); West Long Branch, NJ
01/04/2014; 7:00 pm, TWCS NY	Rider	W 62–47	6–9 (2–2)	20 – Bisping	7 – Bisping, Silas	5 – Wright	Times Union Center (6,180); Albany, NY
01/10/2014; 7:00 pm, TWCS NY	Marist	W 67–58	7–9 (3–2)	17 – Hymes	14 – Bisping	7 – Wright	Times Union Center (5,864); Albany, NY
01/12/2014; 2:00 pm	Iona	L 78–87	7–10 (3–3)	19 – Hymes	6 – Oliver	7 – Wright	Times Union Center (5,793); Albany, NY
01/16/2014; 7:00 pm	at Manhattan	L 68–90	7–11 (3–4)	13 – Poole	11 – Poole	5 – Wright	Draddy Gymnasium (1,587); Riverdale, NY
01/19/2014; 5:00 pm	at Iona	L 74–88	7–12 (3–5)	23 – Hymes	11 – Long	8 – Wright	Hynes Athletic Center (1,619); New Rochelle, NY
01/23/2014; 7:00 pm, TWCS NY	Saint Peter's	W 64–47	8–12 (4–5)	14 – Bisping, Poole	9 – Wright	7 – Hymes	Times Union Center (5,205); Albany, NY
01/26/2014; 12:00 pm	at Fairfield	W 64–56	9–12 (5–5)	19 – Bisping, Poole	6 – Oliver	3 – Long	Webster Bank Arena (2,051); Bridgeport, CT
01/30/2014; 8:30 pm, ESPN3	Niagara	W 66–62	10–12 (6–5)	15 – Poole	7 – Bisping	4 – Long, Wright	Times Union Center (5,772); Albany, NY
02/01/2014; 7:00 pm, TWCS NY	Quinnipiac	L 95–103 ^{OT}	10–13 (6–6)	26 – Poole	6 – White	10 – Wright	Times Union Center (6,415); Albany, NY
02/07/2014; 7:00 pm	at Saint Peter's	L 53–66	10–14 (6–7)	15 – Oliver	8 – Bisping, Silas	3 – Bisping, Wright, Hymes	Yanitelli Center (353); Jersey City, NJ
02/10/2014; 7:00 pm, TWCS NY	Fairfield	W 77–75	11–14 (7–7)	17 – Bisping	8 – Bisping	4 – Hymes, Wright	Times Union Center (5,536); Albany, NY
02/14/2014; 8:00 pm, ESPN3	at Marist	L 64–65	11–15 (7–8)	20 – Wright	11 – Long	3 – Wright	McCann Field House (1,249); Poughkeepsie, NY
02/16/2014; 2:00 pm, TWCS NY	Canisius	L 88–92 ^{3 OT}	11–16 (7–9)	33 – Poole	9 – Bisping	11 – Wright	Times Union Center (6,428); Albany, NY
02/21/2014; 7:00 pm, ESPN3	Manhattan	W 67–63	12–16 (8–9)	17 – Hymes, Poole	7 – Silas	6 – Wright	Times Union Center (7,928); Albany, NY
02/23/2014; 2:00 pm	at Rider	W 69–60	13–16 (9–9)	16 – Long	11 – Bisping	3 – Hymes, Long, Wright	Alumni Gymnasium (1,650); Lawrenceville, NJ
02/27/2014; 8:30 pm, ESPN3	at Quinnipiac	W 72–70	14–16 (10–9)	15 – Poole	10 – Bisping	7 – Wright	TD Bank Sports Center (2,306); Hamden, CT
03/02/2014; 2:00 pm, TWCS NY	Monmouth	W 70–54	15–16 (11–9)	17 – Bisping	11 – Silas	5 – Wright	Times Union Center (8,148); Albany, NY
MAAC tournament
03/08/2014; 2:30 pm, ESPN3	vs. Canisius; Quarterfinals	L 65–71	15–17	22 – Bisping	9 – Bisping	6 – Wright	MassMutual Center (2,716); Springfield, MA
CBI
03/18/2014*; 7:00 pm	Stony Brook; First round	W 66–55	16–17	20 – Poole	6 – Bisping, Silas, Wright	5 – Wright	Times Union Center (2,575); Albany, NY
03/24/2014*; 7:00 pm, CBSSN	Penn State; Quarterfinals	W 54–52	17–17	17 – Long	12 – Bisping	3 – Oliver, Wright	Times Union Center (3,598); Albany, NY
03/26/2014*; 7:00 pm	Illinois State; Semifinals	W 61–49	18–17	20 – Bisping	13 – Bisping	5 – Wright	Times Union Center (3,980); Albany, NY
03/31/2014*; 10:00 pm, CBSSN	at Fresno State; Finals Game 1	W 61–57	19–17	13 – Long	7 – Wright	3 – Wright	Save Mart Center (5,284); Fresno, CA
04/02/2014*; 7:00 pm, CBSSN	Fresno State; Finals Game 2	L 75–89	19–18	20 – Bisping	6 – Wright	3 – Long, Oliver	Alumni Recreation Center (3,177); Loudonville, NY
04/05/2014*; 11:30 am, CBSSN	Fresno State; Finals Game 3	W 81–68	20–18	23 – Poole	9 – Bisping	4 – Long, Wright	Alumni Recreation Center (2,788); Loudonville, NY
*Non-conference game. ^{#}Rankings from AP Poll. (#) Tournament seedings in parentheses. All times are in Eastern Time.
