= 2013–14 Marist Red Foxes men's basketball team =

American college basketball season

2013–14 Marist Red Foxes men's basketball
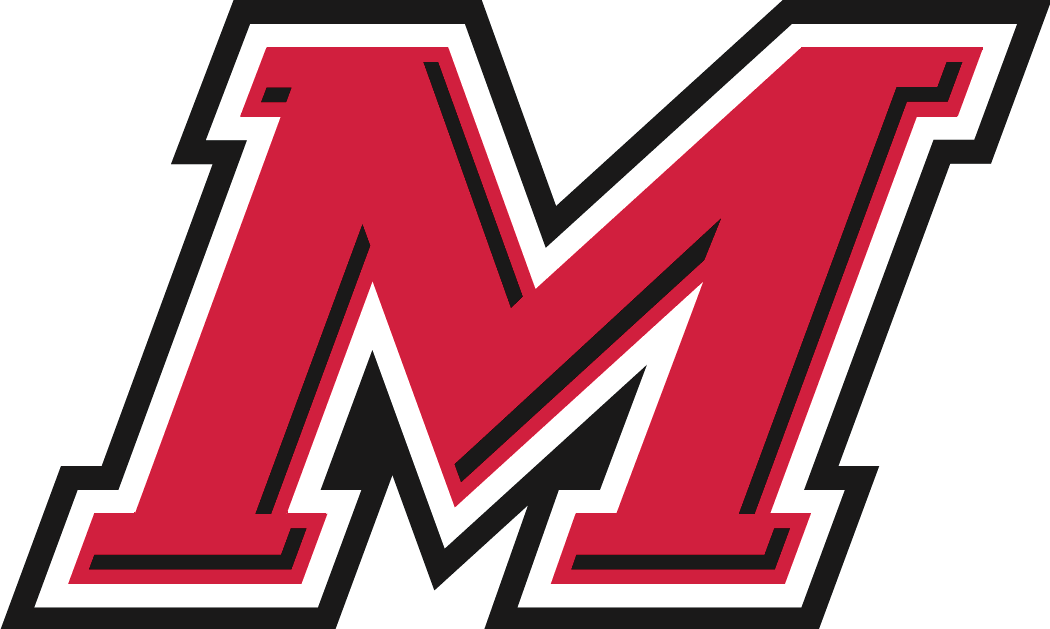
- Conference: Metro Atlantic Athletic Conference
- Record: 12–19 (9–11 MAAC)
- Head coach: Jeff Bower (1st season)
- Assistant coaches: Brian Adams; Eugene Burroughs; Paul Lee
- Home arena: McCann Arena

2013–14 MAAC men's basketball standings
	Conf.				Overall
Team	W		L	PCT	W		L	PCT
Iona	17	–	3	.850	22	–	11	.667
Manhattan †	15	–	5	.750	25	–	8	.758
Quinnipiac	14	–	6	.700	20	–	12	.625
Canisius	14	–	6	.700	21	–	13	.618
Siena	11	–	9	.550	20	–	18	.526
Saint Peter's	9	–	11	.450	14	–	17	.452
Rider	9	–	11	.450	14	–	17	.452
Marist	9	–	11	.450	12	–	19	.387
Monmouth	5	–	15	.250	11	–	21	.344
Fairfield	4	–	16	.200	7	–	25	.219
Niagara	3	–	17	.150	7	–	26	.212
† 2014 MAAC tournament winner

The 2013–14 Marist Red Foxes men's basketball team represented Marist College during the 2013–14 NCAA Division I men's basketball season. The Red Foxes, led by first year head coach Jeff Bower, played their home games at the McCann Arena and were members of the Metro Atlantic Athletic Conference. They finished the season 12–19, 9–11 in MAAC play to finish in a three-way tie for sixth place. They lost in the first round of the MAAC tournament to Niagara. On June 2, 2014, head coach Jeff Bower resigned after one season to take the General manager position with the Detroit Pistons. On June 17, 2014, Marist hired Mike Maker as their new head coach.

== Previous season ==
The Red Foxes finished the 2012–13 season 10–21, 6–12 in MAAC play to finish in eighth place. They lost in the first round of the MAAC tournament to Siena. On March 14, 2013, head coach Chuck Martin was fired. On April 10, 2013, Marist hired Jeff Bower as their new head coach.

== Roster ==
2013–14 Marist Red Foxes men's basketball team
Players
Coaches

Pos.	#	Name	Height	Weight	Year	Previous school	Hometown
F	1	Kentrall Brooks	6 ft 8 in (2.03 m)	200 lb (91 kg)	Fr	St. Anthony (NJ)	Bronx, New York
G	4	Nick Colletta	6 ft 5 in (1.96 m)	190 lb (86 kg)	Fr	Glendora	Glendora, California
G	5	Khalid Hart	6 ft 2 in (1.88 m)	180 lb (82 kg)	RS Fr	Sanford School	Newark, Delaware
G	11	Isaiah Morton	5 ft 8 in (1.73 m)	170 lb (77 kg)	Jr	St. Augustine Prep	Vineland, New Jersey
G/F	20	Jay Bowie	6 ft 5 in (1.96 m)	210 lb (95 kg)	Sr	Tampa Prep	Tampa, Florida
G	21	Tourron Whitfield	6 ft 2 in (1.88 m)	170 lb (77 kg)	Jr	Archbishop Molloy	Valley Stream, New York
G/F	24	Manny Thomas	6 ft 5 in (1.96 m)	190 lb (86 kg)	Jr	Xaverian	Brooklyn, New York
G/F	30	Patrick Ramsey	6 ft 4 in (1.93 m)	185 lb (84 kg)	Sr	Easthampton	Easthampton, Massachusetts
G	32	T.J. Curry	6 ft 1 in (1.85 m)	190 lb (86 kg)	Jr	Christ the King	Brooklyn, New York
F	34	Pieter Prinsloo	6 ft 10 in (2.08 m)	225 lb (102 kg)	Sr	Dover (DE)	Johannesburg, South Africa
F	35	Phillip Lawrence-Ricks	6 ft 7 in (2.01 m)	190 lb (86 kg)	So	Mount St. Joseph	Baltimore, Maryland
G/F	40	Chavaughn Lewis	6 ft 5 in (1.96 m)	185 lb (84 kg)	Jr	St. Mary's (Manhasset, NY)	Queens, New York
C	44	Eric Truog	6 ft 10 in (2.08 m)	240 lb (109 kg)	So	Kenston	Chagrin Falls, Ohio
F	50	Adam Kemp	6 ft 10 in (2.08 m)	235 lb (107 kg)	Sr	Winchendon School (MA)	Sherrill, New York

Head coach

- Jeff Bower (Saint Francis (PA), 1st yr., 1983)

Assistant coach(es)

- Brian Adams (Connecticut College, 1st yr., 2006)
- Eugene Burroughs (Richmond, 1st yr., 1994)
- Paul Lee (Columbia, 6th yr., 1986)

Legend

- (C) Team captain
- (S) Suspended
- (I) Ineligible
- (W) Walk-on
- Injured
- Current redshirt

Roster
Last update: 2013-11-20

== Schedule ==
Date time, TV	Rank^{#}	Opponent^{#}	Result	Record	Site (attendance) city, state
Regular season
11/08/2013*; 8:00 pm		at Stony Brook	L 55–71	0–1	Pritchard Gymnasium (1,630); Stony Brook, NY
11/10/2013*; 5:00 pm		Elon	L 48–75	0–2	McCann Arena (1,577); Poughkeepsie, NY
11/13/2013*; 7:00 pm		at Saint Joseph's	L 62–81	0–3	Hagan Arena (3,871); Philadelphia, PA
11/16/2013*; 4:00 pm		at Providence	L 48–93	0–4	Dunkin' Donuts Center (6,799); Providence, RI
11/22/2013*; 4:00 pm, CBSSN		vs. Maryland; Paradise Jam tournament	L 43–68	0–5	Sports and Fitness Center (1,527); Saint Thomas, USVI
11/23/2013*; 2:30 pm, CBSSN		vs. Loyola Marymount; Paradise Jam Tournament	L 70–76	0–6	Sports and Fitness Center (N/A); Saint Thomas, USVI
11/25/2013*; 2:30 pm, CBSSN		vs. Morgan State; Paradise Jam Tournament	L 67–74 ^{OT}	0–7	Sports and Fitness Center (1,222); Saint Thomas, USVI
12/04/2013; 7:00 pm		at Iona	L 74–83	0–8 (0–1)	Hynes Athletic Center (1,753); New Rochelle, NY
12/06/2013; 7:00 pm		Manhattan	L 59–70	0–9 (0–2)	McCann Arena (1,588); Poughkeepsie, NY
12/15/2013*; 2:00 pm		at College of Charleston	W 69–62	1–9	TD Arena (1,770); Charleston, SC
12/20/2013*; 7:00 pm		Bucknell	W 69–51	2–9	McCann Arena (1,119); Poughkeepsie, NY
12/22/2013*; 2:00 pm		Penn	W 76–62	3–9	McCann Arena (1,050); Poughkeepsie, NY
01/02/2014; 7:00 pm		Fairfield	W 75–56	4–9 (1–2)	McCann Arena (830); Poughkeepsie, NY
01/06/2014; 7:00 pm		Canisius	W 65–62	5–9 (2–2)	McCann Arena (953); Poughkeepsie, NY
01/10/2014; 7:00 pm		at Siena	L 58–67	5–10 (2–3)	Times Union Center (5,864); Albany, NY
01/12/2014; 2:00 pm		at Manhattan	L 79–86 ^{OT}	5–11 (2–4)	Draddy Gymnasium (2,212); Riverdale, NY
01/18/2014; 7:00 pm		Rider	L 56–66	5–12 (2–5)	McCann Arena (1,492); Poughkeepsie, NY
01/20/2014; 7:00 pm		Saint Peter's	W 70–63	6–12 (3–5)	McCann Arena (1,165); Poughkeepsie, NY
01/24/2014; 7:00 pm		at Niagara	L 74–80	6–13 (3–6)	Gallagher Center (1,250); Lewiston, NY
01/26/2014; 2:00 pm		at Canisius	L 65–78	6–14 (3–7)	Koessler Athletic Center (1,742); Buffalo, NY
01/30/2014; 7:00 pm		Monmouth	W 75–73	7–14 (4–7)	McCann Arena (1,356); Poughkeepsie, NY
02/01/2014; 7:00 pm, ESPN3		Niagara	W 78–64	8–14 (5–7)	McCann Arena (1,657); Poughkeepsie, NY
02/06/2014; 8:30 pm, ESPN3		at Rider	W 68–61	9–14 (6–7)	Alumni Gymnasium (1,620); Lawrenceville, NJ
02/10/2014; 7:00 pm		at Quinnipiac	L 78–83	9–15 (6–8)	TD Bank Sports Center (1,204); Hamden, CT
02/14/2014; 8:00 pm, ESPN3		Siena	W 65–64	10–15 (7–8)	McCann Arena (1,249); Poughkeepsie, NY
02/16/2014; 2:00 pm		at Monmouth	W 96–92 ^{2OT}	11–15 (8–8)	Multipurpose Activity Center (2,241); West Long Branch, NJ
02/20/2014; 8:30 pm, ESPN3		at Saint Peter's	L 57–58	11–16 (8–9)	Yanitelli Center (552); Jersey City, NJ
02/23/2014; 2:00 pm		Iona	L 67–86	11–17 (8–10)	McCann Arena (1,820); Poughkeepsie, NY
02/28/2014; 7:00 pm		at Fairfield	L 74–78	11–18 (8–11)	Webster Bank Arena (2,393); Bridgeport, CT
03/02/2014; 2:00 pm		Quinnipiac	W 103–72	12–18 (9–11)	McCann Arena (1,621); Poughkeepsie, NY
2014 MAAC tournament
03/06/2014; 10:00 pm	(6)	vs. (11) Niagara; First round	L 76–78	12–19	MassMutual Center (1,174); Springfield, MA
*Non-conference game. ^{#}Rankings from AP Poll. (#) Tournament seedings in parentheses. All times are in Eastern Time.
