= 2013–14 Rider Broncs men's basketball team =

American college basketball season

2013–14 Rider Broncs men's basketball
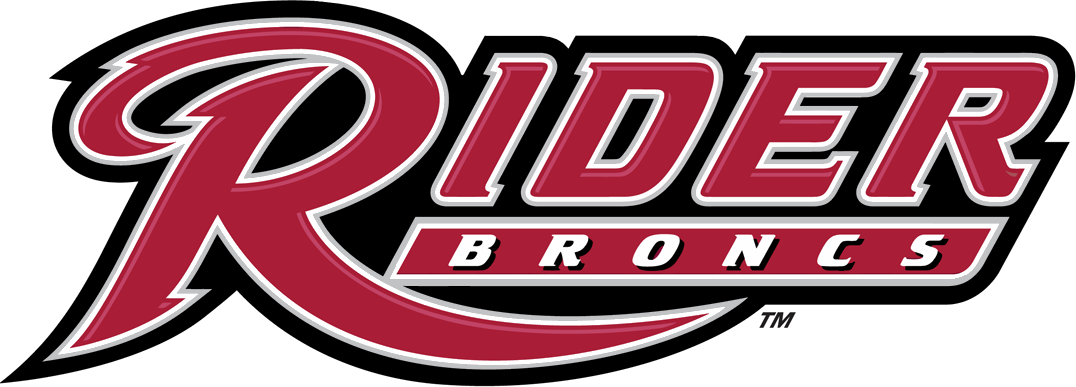
- Conference: Metro Atlantic Athletic Conference
- Record: 14–17 (9–11 MAAC)
- Head coach: Kevin Baggett (2nd season)
- Assistant coaches: Mike Witcoskie; John Griffin; Donyell Marshall
- Home arena: Alumni Gymnasium

2013–14 MAAC men's basketball standings
	Conf.				Overall
Team	W		L	PCT	W		L	PCT
Iona	17	–	3	.850	22	–	11	.667
Manhattan †	15	–	5	.750	25	–	8	.758
Quinnipiac	14	–	6	.700	20	–	12	.625
Canisius	14	–	6	.700	21	–	13	.618
Siena	11	–	9	.550	20	–	18	.526
Saint Peter's	9	–	11	.450	14	–	17	.452
Rider	9	–	11	.450	14	–	17	.452
Marist	9	–	11	.450	12	–	19	.387
Monmouth	5	–	15	.250	11	–	21	.344
Fairfield	4	–	16	.200	7	–	25	.219
Niagara	3	–	17	.150	7	–	26	.212
† 2014 MAAC tournament winner

The 2013–14 Rider Broncs men's basketball team represented Rider University during the 2013–14 NCAA Division I men's basketball season. The Broncs, led by second year head coach Kevin Baggett, played their home games at Alumni Gymnasium and were members of the Metro Atlantic Athletic Conference. They finished the season 14–17, 9–11 in MAAC play to finish in a three way tie for sixth place. They advanced to the quarterfinals of the MAAC tournament where they lost to Iona.

== Roster ==
Number	Name	Position	Height	Weight	Year	Hometown
0	Kahilil Thomas	Forward	6–7	204	Freshman	Parkway, Florida
2	Zedric Sadler	Guard	6–2	195	Sophomore	Detroit, Michigan
3	Jimmie Taylor	Guard	6–3	180	Freshman	Suwannee, Florida
5	Teddy Okereafor	Guard	6–4	191	Junior	London, England
10	Anthony Myles	Guard	6–5	205	Senior	Dover, Delaware
11	Xavier Lundy	Forward	6–7	220	Freshman	Paulsboro, New Jersey
12	Brandon Channer	Guard	6–3	215	Freshman	Manchester, Jamaica
13	Daniel Stewart	Forward	6–7	215	Senior	Philadelphia, Pennsylvania
14	Shawn Valentine	Forward	6–7	190	Sophomore	Sicklerville, New Jersey
15	Khalil Alford	Guard	6–4	200	Sophomore	Raleigh, North Carolina
20	Emerson Bursis	Forward	6–5	200	Junior	Scotrun, Pennsylvania
24	Davis Graham	Guard	6–1	170	Freshman	Cinnaminson, New Jersey
25	Junior Fortunat	Forward/Center	6–9	235	Junior	Montreal, Quebec
32	Tommy Pereira	Guard	6–2	190	Senior	Nottingham, England
33	Skylar Scrivano	Center	6–10	230	Junior	Doylestown, Pennsylvania
35	Matt Lopez	Center	7–0	245	Junior	Erial, New Jersey

== Schedule ==
Date time, TV	Opponent	Result	Record	Site (attendance) city, state
Exhibition
11/02/2013*; 4:00 pm	East Stroudsburg	W 79–76		Alumni Gymnasium (1,650); Lawrenceville, NJ
Regular season
11/12/2013*; 7:00 pm	at Lehigh	L 78–92	0–1	Stabler Arena (1,042); Bethlehem, PA
11/17/2013*; 7:00 pm, BTN	at Purdue	L 77–81	0–2	Mackey Arena (12,086); West Lafayette, IN
11/23/2013*; 8:00 pm	at Central Connecticut	W 89–73	1–2	William H. Detrick Gymnasium (1,615); New Britain, CT
11/26/2013*; 7:00 pm	Albany	L 59–70	1–3	Alumni Gymnasium (1,030); Lawrenceville, NJ
11/29/2013*; 9:00 pm	vs. Rice; Cable Car Classic	W 97–93 ^{OT}	2–3	Leavey Center (850); Santa Clara, CA
11/30/2013*; 11:45 pm	vs. North Dakota State; Cable Car Classic	W 87–70	2–4	Leavey Center (1,024); Santa Clara, CA
12/05/2013; 7:00 pm, ESPN3	at Monmouth	W 89–83	3–4 (1–0)	Multipurpose Activity Center (2,705); West Long Branch, NJ
12/08/2013; 2:00 pm	Quinnipiac	W 90–78	4–4 (2–0)	Alumni Gymnasium (1,414); Lawrenceville, NJ
12/14/2013*; 3:00 pm	Wagner	W 79–58	5–4	Alumni Gymnasium (1,412); Lawrenceville, NJ
12/21/2013*; 4:00 pm, FS1	at No. 8 Villanova	L 67–88	5–5	The Pavilion (6,500); Villanova, PA
12/29/2013*; 12:00 pm, CSN	Penn	W 89–88	6–5	Alumni Gymnasium (1,629); Lawrenceville, NJ
01/02/2014; 7:00 pm	Niagara	W 85–83	7–5 (3–0)	Alumni Gymnasium (1,002); Lawrenceville, NJ
01/04/2014; 7:00 pm	at Siena	L 47–62	7–6 (3–1)	Times Union Center (6,180); Albany, NY
01/10/2014; 7:00 pm	at Canisius	L 91–94 ^{2OT}	7–7 (3–2)	Koessler Athletic Center (1,226); Buffalo, NY
01/12/2014; 2:00 pm	at Niagara	W 90–78	8–7 (4–2)	Gallagher Center (1,207); Lewiston, NY
01/16/2014; 7:00 pm	Saint Peter's	L 69–77	8–8 (4–3)	Alumni Gymnasium (1,416); Lawrenceville, NJ
01/18/2014; 7:00 pm	at Marist	W 66–56	9–8 (5–3)	McCann Field House (1,492); Poughkeepsie, NY
01/24/2014; 7:00 pm, ESPNU	at Manhattan	L 51–67	9–9 (5–4)	Draddy Gymnasium (1,632); Riverdale, NY
01/26/2014; 2:00 pm	Monmouth	W 77–71 ^{OT}	10–9 (6–4)	Alumni Gymnasium (1,626); Lawrenceville, NJ
01/31/2014; 7:00 pm, ESPN3	at Saint Peter's	W 71–53	11–9 (7–4)	Yanitelli Center (503); Jersey City, NJ
02/03/2014; 7:00 pm	Fairfield	W 73–65	12–9 (8–4)	Alumni Gymnasium (1,103); Lawrenceville, NJ
02/06/2014; 8:30 pm, ESPN3	Marist	L 61–68	12–10 (8–5)	Alumni Gymnasium (1,620); Lawrenceville, NJ
02/08/2014; 2:00 pm	at Quinnipiac	L 61–82	12–11 (8–6)	TD Bank Sports Center (2,868); Hamden, CT
02/13/2014; 7:00 pm	Manhattan	L 69–86	12–12 (8–7)	Alumni Gymnasium (1,213); Lawrenceville, NJ
02/15/2014; 4:00 pm	at Fairfield	W 71–62	13–12 (9–7)	Webster Bank Arena (1,427); Bridgeport, CT
02/21/2014; 7:00 pm, ESPNU	Iona	L 77–80	13–13 (9–8)	Alumni Gymnasium (1,616); Lawrenceville, NJ
02/23/2014; 2:00 pm	Siena	L 60–69	13–14 (9–9)	Alumni Gymnasium (1,650); Lawrenceville, NJ
02/28/2014; 7:00 pm	Canisius	L 66–79	13–15 (9–10)	Alumni Gymnasium (1,650); Lawrenceville, NJ
03/02/2014; 2:30 pm, ESPN3	at Iona	L 81–97	13–16 (9–11)	Hynes Athletic Center (2,611); New Rochelle, NY
2014 MAAC tournament
03/06/2014; 5:00 pm	vs. Monmouth; First round	W 71–60	14–16	MassMutual Center (1,174); Springfield, MA
03/08/2013; 12:00 pm, ESPN3	vs. Iona; Quarterfinals	L 71–94	14–17	MassMutual Center (2,716); Springfield, MA
*Non-conference game. ^{#}Rankings from AP Poll. (#) Tournament seedings in parentheses. All times are in Eastern Time.
