= 2013–14 Saint Peter's Peacocks men's basketball team =

American college basketball season

2013–14 Saint Peter's Peacocks men's basketball
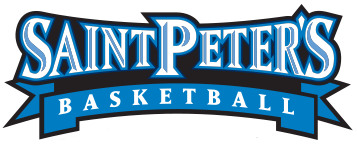
- Conference: Metro Atlantic Athletic Conference
- Record: 14–17 (9–11 MAAC)
- Head coach: John Dunne (8th season)
- Assistant coaches: Marlon Guild; Matt Henry; Serge Clement
- Home arena: Yanitelli Center

2013–14 MAAC men's basketball standings
	Conf.				Overall
Team	W		L	PCT	W		L	PCT
Iona	17	–	3	.850	22	–	11	.667
Manhattan †	15	–	5	.750	25	–	8	.758
Quinnipiac	14	–	6	.700	20	–	12	.625
Canisius	14	–	6	.700	21	–	13	.618
Siena	11	–	9	.550	20	–	18	.526
Saint Peter's	9	–	11	.450	14	–	17	.452
Rider	9	–	11	.450	14	–	17	.452
Marist	9	–	11	.450	12	–	19	.387
Monmouth	5	–	15	.250	11	–	21	.344
Fairfield	4	–	16	.200	7	–	25	.219
Niagara	3	–	17	.150	7	–	26	.212
† 2014 MAAC tournament winner

The 2013–14 Saint Peter's Peacocks men's basketball team represented Saint Peter's University during the 2013–14 NCAA Division I men's basketball season. The Peacocks, led by eighth-year head coach John Dunne, played their home games at the Yanitelli Center in Jersey City, New Jersey and were members of the Metro Atlantic Athletic Conference (MAAC). They finished the season 14–17, 9–11 in MAAC play, to finish in a three-way tie for sixth place. They advanced to the quarterfinals of the MAAC tournament before falling to Manhattan.

== Roster ==
Number	Name	Position	Height	Weight	Year	Hometown
0	Howard Sellars	Guard	6' 1"	165	Freshman	Coatesville, PA
1	Mohamed Farih	Forward	6' 4"	190	Junior	Kearny, NJ
3	Trevis Wyche	Guard	6' 0"	165	Freshman	Neptune, NJ
4	Jamel Fields	Guard	6' 2"	175	RS–Junior	Albany, New York
5	Vic Adams	Guard	6' 3"	165	Junior	West Palm Beach, FL
10	Elias Desport	Forward	6' 7"	213	Sophomore	Stockholm, Sweden
11	Desi Washington	Guard	6' 2"	175	RS–Junior	Harrisburg, PA
13	Tyler Gaskins	Forward	6' 5"	200	Junior	Roswell, GA
20	Chazz Patterson	Guard	6' 3"	170	Sophomore	Browns Mills, NJ
21	Marvin Dominique	Forward	6' 7"	215	RS–Junior	Miramar, FL
22	Chris Burke	Guard	6' 4"	185	Senior	Willingboro, NJ
24	Markese Tucker	Forward	6' 5"	240	Junior	Trenton, NJ
25	Kris Rolle	Forward	6' 5"	215	Junior	Miami, FL
35	Quadir Welton	Forward/Center	6' 7"	220	Freshman	Philadelphia, PA

== Schedule ==
Date time, TV	Opponent	Result	Record	Site (attendance) city, state
Regular season
November 9, 2013*; 12:00 p.m.	vs. LIU Brooklyn	L 80–87	0–1	Barclays Center (2,145); Brooklyn, NY
November 12, 2013*; 7:00 p.m.	Hampton	L 59–64	0–2	Yanitelli Center (516); Jersey City, NJ
November 17, 2013*; 2:00 p.m.	at Kent State	L 58–75	0–3	MAC Center (2,282); Kent, OH
November 23, 2013*; 7:00 p.m.	at Fairleigh Dickinson	W 67–63	1–3	Rothman Center (720); Hackensack, NJ
November 26, 2013*; 7:00 p.m.	Binghamton	W 70–57	2–3	Yanitelli Center (364); Jersey City, NJ
November 30, 2013*; 1:00 p.m.	at Boston University	L 65–66	2–4	Case Gym (371); Boston, MA
December 6, 2013; 7:00 p.m.	at Canisius	L 67–82	2–5 (0–1)	Koessler Athletic Center (1,506); Buffalo, NY
December 8, 2013; 2:00 p.m.	at Niagara	L 56–61	2–6 (0–2)	Gallagher Center (1,257); Lewiston, NY
December 14, 2013*; 12:00 p.m., FSN	at Seton Hall	W 83–80 ^{OT}	3–6	Prudential Center (6,725); Newark, NJ
December 22, 2013*; 2:00 p.m.	at Hartford	L 56–66	3–7	Chase Arena (1,278); Hartford, CT
December 28, 2013*; 2:00 p.m.	Cornell	W 67–59	4–7	Yanitelli Center (261); Jersey City, NJ
January 2, 2014; 7:00 p.m.	Manhattan	L 62–74	4–8 (0–3)	Yanitelli Center (163); Jersey City, NJ
January 4, 2014; 2:00 p.m.	Canisius	L 63–67	4–9 (0–4)	Yanitelli Center (143); Jersey City, NJ
January 8, 2014; 7:00 p.m.	at Fairfield	W 56–55	5–9 (1–4)	Webster Bank Arena (1,240); Bridgeport, CT
January 12, 2014; 2:30 p.m.	Quinnipiac	W 74–67	6–9 (2–4)	Yanitelli Center (408); Jersey City, NJ
January 16, 2014; 7:00 p.m.	at Rider	W 77–69	7–9 (3–4)	Alumni Gymnasium (1,416); Lawrenceville, NJ
January 20, 2014; 7:00 p.m., ESPN3	at Marist	L 63–70	7–10 (3–5)	McCann Field House (1,165); Poughkeepsie, NY
January 23, 2014; 7:00 p.m.	at Siena	L 47–64	7–11 (3–6)	Times Union Center (5,205); Albany, NY
January 26, 2014; 2:00 p.m.	Iona	L 63–71	7–12 (3–7)	Yanitelli Center (370); Jersey City, NJ
January 31, 2014; 7:00 p.m., ESPN3	Rider	L 53–71	7–13 (3–8)	Yanitelli Center (503); Jersey City, NJ
February 4, 2014; 7:00 p.m.	at Manhattan	L 49–64	7–14 (3–9)	Draddy Gymnasium (1,273); Riverdale, NY
February 7, 2014; 7:00 p.m.	Siena	W 66–53	8–14 (4–9)	Yanitelli Center (353); Jersey City, NJ
February 9, 2014; 2:00 p.m.	Monmouth	W 61–50	9–14 (5–9)	Yanitelli Center (429); Jersey City, NJ
February 12, 2014; 7:00 p.m.	at Iona	L 59–62	9–15 (5–10)	Hynes Athletic Center (1,256); New Rochelle, NY
February 16, 2014; 4:00 p.m.	at Quinnipiac	L 64–74	9–16 (5–11)	TD Bank Sports Center (2,524); Hamden, CT
February 20, 2014; 8:30 p.m., ESPN3	Marist	W 58–57	10–16 (6–11)	Yanitelli Center (552); Jersey City, NJ
February 22, 2014; 7:00 p.m., ESPN3	at Monmouth	W 61–51	11–16 (7–11)	Multipurpose Activity Center (3,899); West Long Branch, NJ
February 25, 2014; 7:00 p.m.	Fairfield	W 63–62	12–16 (8–11)	Yanitelli Center (387); Jersey City, NJ
March 2, 2014; 2:00 p.m.	Niagara	W 71–67	13–16 (9–11)	Yanitelli Center (N/A); Jersey City, NJ
2014 MAAC tournament
March 6, 2014; 7:22 p.m.	vs. Fairfield; First round	W 65–62 ^{OT}	14–16	MassMutual Center (1,174); Springfield, MA
March 8, 2013; 6:30 p.m., ESPN3	vs. Manhattan; Quarterfinals	L 58–72	14–17	MassMutual Center (1,645); Springfield, MA
*Non-conference game. ^{#}Rankings from AP poll. (#) Tournament seedings in parentheses. All times are in Eastern.
