= 2014 MAAC men's basketball tournament =

- Classification: Division I
- Season: 2013–14
- Teams: 11
- Site: MassMutual Center; Springfield, Massachusetts
- Champions: Manhattan (4th title)
- Winning coach: Steve Masiello (1st title)
- MVP: George Beamon (Manhattan)
- Television: ESPN3, ESPN2

2013–14 MAAC men's basketball standings
	Conf.				Overall
Team	W		L	PCT	W		L	PCT
Iona	17	–	3	.850	22	–	11	.667
Manhattan †	15	–	5	.750	25	–	8	.758
Quinnipiac	14	–	6	.700	20	–	12	.625
Canisius	14	–	6	.700	21	–	13	.618
Siena	11	–	9	.550	20	–	18	.526
Saint Peter's	9	–	11	.450	14	–	17	.452
Rider	9	–	11	.450	14	–	17	.452
Marist	9	–	11	.450	12	–	19	.387
Monmouth	5	–	15	.250	11	–	21	.344
Fairfield	4	–	16	.200	7	–	25	.219
Niagara	3	–	17	.150	7	–	26	.212
† 2014 MAAC tournament winner

The 2014 Metro Atlantic Athletic Conference men's basketball tournament was held March 6–10 at the MassMutual Center in Springfield, Massachusetts. The winner of the tournament, Manhattan, received the conference's automatic bid into the 2014 NCAA tournament. The regular season champion, Iona, received an automatic bid into the 2014 NIT Tournament.

== Seeds ==
All 11 teams in the conference participate in the Tournament. The top five teams will receive byes to the quarterfinals. Teams are seeded by record within the conference, with a tiebreaker system to seed teams with identical conference records.

Seed	School	Conference	Tiebreaker	Tiebreaker 2	Tiebreaker 3
1	Iona	17–3			
2	Manhattan	15–5			
3	Quinnipiac	14–6	1–1 vs Canisius	2–0 vs Manhattan	
4	Canisius	14–6	1–1 vs Quinnipiac	0–2 vs Manhattan	
5	Siena	11–9			
6	Marist	9–11	Mini Conference 2–2	2–2 vs Quinnipiac/Canisius	
7	Saint Peter's	9–11	Mini Conference 2–2	1–3 vs Quinnipiac/Canisius	1–1 vs Siena
8	Rider	9–11	Mini Conference 2–2	1–3 vs Quinnipiac/Canisius	0–2 vs Siena
9	Monmouth	5–15			
10	Fairfield	4–16			
11	Niagara	3–17			

== Bracket ==
First round Thursday, March 6
8	Rider	71
9	Monmouth	60
7	Saint Peter's	65
10	Fairfield	62^{OT}
6	Marist	76
11	Niagara	78

Quarterfinals; Saturday, March 8 ESPN3
1	Iona	94
8	Rider	71
4	Canisius	71
5	Siena	65
2	Manhattan	72
7	Saint Peter's	58
3	Quinnipiac	89
11	Niagara	80

Semifinals; Sunday, March 9 ESPN3
1	Iona	75
4	Canisius	72
2	Manhattan	87
3	Quinnipiac	68

Championship; Monday, March 10; ESPN2
1	Iona	68
2	Manhattan	71
