= 2013–14 Niagara Purple Eagles men's basketball team =

American college basketball season

2013–14 Niagara Purple Eagles men's basketball
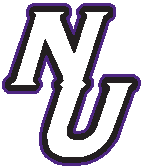
- Conference: Metro Atlantic Athletic Conference
- Record: 7–26 (3–17 MAAC)
- Head coach: Chris Casey (1st season)
- Assistant coaches: Marc Rybczyk; Will Lanier; Kareem Brown
- Home arena: Gallagher Center

2013–14 MAAC men's basketball standings
	Conf.				Overall
Team	W		L	PCT	W		L	PCT
Iona	17	–	3	.850	22	–	11	.667
Manhattan †	15	–	5	.750	25	–	8	.758
Quinnipiac	14	–	6	.700	20	–	12	.625
Canisius	14	–	6	.700	21	–	13	.618
Siena	11	–	9	.550	20	–	18	.526
Saint Peter's	9	–	11	.450	14	–	17	.452
Rider	9	–	11	.450	14	–	17	.452
Marist	9	–	11	.450	12	–	19	.387
Monmouth	5	–	15	.250	11	–	21	.344
Fairfield	4	–	16	.200	7	–	25	.219
Niagara	3	–	17	.150	7	–	26	.212
† 2014 MAAC tournament winner

The 2013–14 Niagara Purple Eagles men's basketball team represented Niagara University during the 2013–14 NCAA Division I men's basketball season. The Purple Eagles, led by first-year head coach Chris Casey, played their home games at the Gallagher Center and were members of the Metro Atlantic Athletic Conference. They finished the season 7–26, 3–17 in MAAC play to finish in last place. They advanced to the quarterfinals of the MAAC tournament, where they lost to Quinnipiac.

== Roster ==
Number	Name	Position	Height	Weight	Year	Hometown
1	Camerson Fowler	Guard	6–0	165	RS freshman	Detroit, Michigan
2	Emile Blackman	Guard	6–4	195	RS sophomore	Dix Hills, New York
4	Rayvon Harris	Guard/forward	6–5	214	RS sophomore	Raleigh, North Carolina
5	Tahjere McCall	Guard	6–4	160	Sophomore	Philadelphia, Pennsylvania
10	Wesley Myers	Guard	6–2	180	Freshman	Brooklyn, New York
11	Ramone Snowden	Forward	6–4	210	Freshman	Virginia Beach, Virginia
12	Karonn Davis	Guard	6–2	185	Freshman	Philadelphia, Pennsylvania
13	Aaron Bodie	Forward	6–7	195	Freshman	Newark, New Jersey
14	Antoine Mason	Guard	6–3	210	RS junior	Queens, New York
21	Marcus Ware	Forward	6–8	215	RS senior	Vineland, New Jersey
22	Dominique Reid	Forward	6–8	200	Freshman	Erial, New Jersey
24	David Varoli	Guard	6–0	175	Freshman	Katonah, New York
30	Joe Thomas	Forward	6–7	220	RS junior	Miami, Florida
31	Thomas Fleming	Guard	6–4	195	RS sophomore	Dobbs Ferry, New York
32	Marvin Jordan	Guard	5–11	175	Junior	Peoria, Illinois
35	Alex Dubovitskiy	Guard/forward	6–5	195	Freshman	Moscow, Russia

== Schedule ==
Date time, TV	Opponent	Result	Record	Site (attendance) city, state
Exhibition
10/25/2013*; 7:00 pm	Roberts Wesleyan	W 82–44		Gallagher Center (1,249); Lewiston, NY
11/01/2013*; 7:00 pm, LCTV	Buffalo State	W 96–71		Gallagher Center (1,277); Lewiston, NY
Regular season
11/09/2013*; 6:00 pm, FS2	at Seton Hall; Coaches Vs. Cancer Classic	L 72–83	0–1	Prudential Center (N/A); Newark, NJ
11/13/2013*; 7:00 pm, LCTV	Buffalo	W 92–81	1–1	Gallagher Center (1,937); Lewiston, NY
11/21/2013*; 5:00 pm	vs. USC Upstate; Coaches Vs. Cancer Classic	L 74–83	1–2	MAC Center (382); Kent, OH
11/22/2013*; 5:00 pm	vs. Western Carolina; Coaches Vs. Cancer Classic	L 90–98	1–3	MAC Center (579); Kent, OH
11/23/2013*; 7:30 pm	at Kent State; Coaches Vs. Cancer Classic	L 97–102	1–4	MAC Center (2,173); Kent, OH
11/26/2013*; 7:00 pm	at Penn	L 66–85	1–5	The Palestra (2,431); Philadelphia, PA
11/30/2013*; 4:00 pm	at Northwestern State	L 100–107	1–6	Prather Coliseum (612); Natchitoches, LA
12/02/2013*; 8:00 pm	at Arkansas State	L 61–86	1–7	Convocation Center (1,645); Jonesboro, AR
12/06/2013; 7:00 pm, TWCS NY	Siena	L 71–84	1–8 (0–1)	Gallagher Center (1,442); Lewiston, NY
12/08/2013; 2:00 pm, LCTV	Saint Peter's	W 61–56	2–8 (1–1)	Gallagher Center (1,257); Lewiston, NY
12/11/2013*; 7:00 pm, TWCS NY	vs. Davidson	W 83–72	3–8	First Niagara Center (4,703); Buffalo, NY
12/21/2013*; 5:00 pm, TWCS NY	St. Bonaventure	L 72–74	3–9	Gallagher Center (1,856); Lewiston, NY
12/29/2013*; 2:00 pm, TWCS NY	Brown	W 68–65	4–9	Gallagher Center (1,411); Lewiston, NY
01/02/2014; 7:00 pm	at Rider	L 83–85	4–10 (1–2)	Alumni Gymnasium (1,002); Lawrenceville, NJ
01/04/2014; 2:00 pm	at Iona	L 92–118	4–11 (1–3)	Hynes Athletic Center (1,776); New Rochelle, NY
01/10/2014; 7:00 pm, LCTV	Monmouth	L 74–85	4–12 (1–4)	Gallagher Center (1,053); Lewiston, NY
01/12/2014; 2:00 pm	Rider	L 78–90	4–13 (1–5)	Gallagher Center (1,207); Lewiston, NY
01/16/2014; 8:30 pm, ESPN3	at Fairfield	W 67–63	5–13 (2–5)	Webster Bank Arena (1,625); Bridgeport, CT
01/18/2014; 4:00 pm	at Quinnipiac	L 71–85	5–14 (2–6)	TD Bank Sports Center (2,589); Hamden, CT
01/22/2014; 7:00 pm	at Canisius; Battle of the Bridge	L 74–87	5–15 (2–7)	Koessler Athletic Center (2,196); Buffalo, NY
01/24/2014; 7:00 pm, TWCS NY	Marist	W 80–74	6–15 (3–7)	Gallagher Center (1,250); Lewiston, NY
01/30/2014; 7:00 pm, ESPN3	at Siena	L 62–66	6–16 (3–8)	Times Union Center (5,772); Albany, NY
02/01/2014; 7:00 pm, ESPN3	at Marist	L 64–78	6–17 (3–9)	McCann Field House (1,657); Poughkeepsie, NY
02/07/2014; 7:00 pm, LCTV	Iona	L 89–90	6–18 (3–10)	Gallagher Center (1,259); Lewiston, NY
02/09/2014; 2:00 pm, LCTV	Manhattan	L 77–78	6–19 (3–11)	Gallagher Center (1,305); Lewiston, NY
02/14/2014; 9:00 pm, ESPNU	Canisius; Battle of the Bridge	L 65–71	6–20 (3–12)	Gallagher Center (2,002); Lewiston, NY
02/16/2014; 2:00 pm	at Manhattan	L 72–90	6–21 (3–13)	Draddy Gymnasium (1,312); Riverdale, NY
02/20/2014; 7:00 pm	Fairfield	L 66–72	6–22 (3–14)	Gallagher Center (1,170); Lewiston, NY
02/22/2014; 3:00 pm	Quinnipiac	L 88–90	6–23 (3–15)	Gallagher Center (1,766); Lewiston, NY
02/28/2014; 7:00 pm	at Monmouth	L 50–75	6–24 (3–16)	Multipurpose Activity Center (1,475); West Long Branch, NJ
03/02/2014; 2:00 pm	at Saint Peter's	L 67–71	6–25 (3–17)	Yanitelli Center (N/A); Jersey City, NJ
2014 MAAC tournament
03/06/2013; 9:00 pm	vs. Marist; First round	W 78–76	7–25	MassMutual Center (1,174); Springfield, MA
03/08/2013; 9:00 pm, ESPN3	vs. Quinnipiac; Quarterfinals	L 80–89	7–26	MassMutual Center (1,645); Springfield, MA
*Non-conference game. ^{#}Rankings from AP Poll. (#) Tournament seedings in parentheses. All times are in Eastern Time.
