= 2013–14 Canisius Golden Griffins men's basketball team =

American college basketball season

2013–14 Canisius Golden Griffins men's basketball
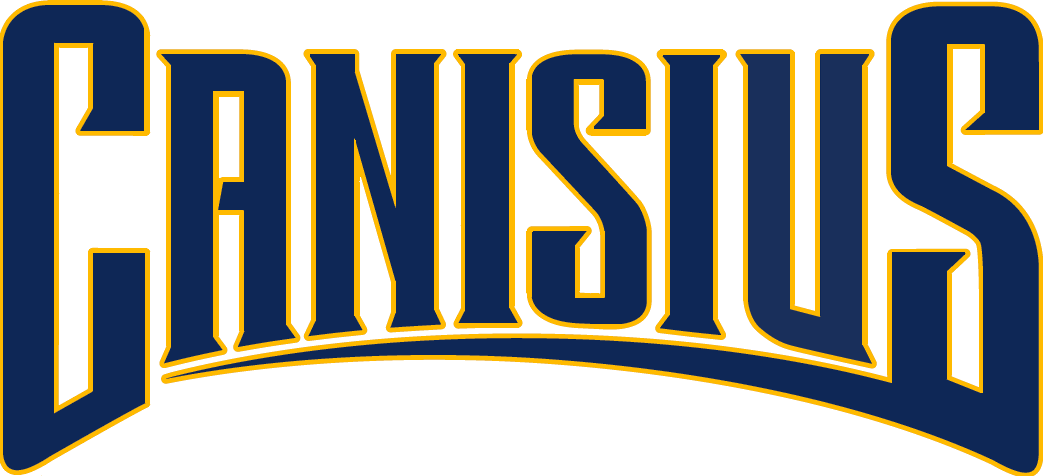

CIT, First round
- Conference: Metro Atlantic Athletic Conference
- Record: 21–13 (14–6 MAAC)
- Head coach: Jim Baron (2nd season)
- Assistant coaches: Pat Clarke; Fred Dupree; Mike Mennenga
- Home arena: Koessler Athletic Center

2013–14 MAAC men's basketball standings
	Conf.				Overall
Team	W		L	PCT	W		L	PCT
Iona	17	–	3	.850	22	–	11	.667
Manhattan †	15	–	5	.750	25	–	8	.758
Quinnipiac	14	–	6	.700	20	–	12	.625
Canisius	14	–	6	.700	21	–	13	.618
Siena	11	–	9	.550	20	–	18	.526
Saint Peter's	9	–	11	.450	14	–	17	.452
Rider	9	–	11	.450	14	–	17	.452
Marist	9	–	11	.450	12	–	19	.387
Monmouth	5	–	15	.250	11	–	21	.344
Fairfield	4	–	16	.200	7	–	25	.219
Niagara	3	–	17	.150	7	–	26	.212
† 2014 MAAC tournament winner

The 2013–14 Canisius Golden Griffins men's basketball team represented Canisius College during the 2013–14 NCAA Division I men's basketball season. The Golden Griffins, led by second year head coach Jim Baron, played their home games at the Koessler Athletic Center and were members of the Metro Atlantic Athletic Conference. They finished the season 21–13, 14–6 in MAAC play to finish in a tie for third place. They advanced to the semifinals of the MAAC tournament where they lost to Iona. They were invited to the CollegeInsider.com Tournament where they lost in the first round to VMI.

== Roster ==
Number	Name	Position	Height	Weight	Year	Hometown
1	Zach Lewis	Guard	6–3	175	Freshman	Windsor, Connecticut
2	Jermaine Crumpton	Forward	6–6	220	Freshman	Niagara Falls, New York
4	Jeremiah Williams	Guard	5–11	165	Junior	Grand Rapids, Michigan
5	Kassius Robertson	Guard	6–3	169	Freshman	Toronto, Ontario, Canada
11	Lou Dunbar	Guard	6–3	170	Freshman	Seabrook, Texas
12	Billy Baron	Guard	6–2	195	Senior	East Greenwich, Rhode Island
13	Chris Manhertz	Forward	6–6	235	Senior	The Bronx, New York
14	Kevin Bleeker	Center	6–10	225	RS–Sophomore	Alkmaar, Netherlands
22	Phil Valenti	Forward	6–7	195	RS–Freshman	Victor, New York
23	Chris Perez	Guard	6–3	210	Senior	Santiago, Dominican Republic
25	Adam Weir	Guard	6–4	185	Freshman	Tonawanda, New York
32	Dominique Raney	Guard	6–4	180	RS–Sophomore	Oklahoma City, Oklahoma
35	Jordan Heath	Forward	6–10	240	Senior	Rochester, New York
50	Josiah Heath	Forward	6–9	230	Junior	Rochester, New York

== Schedule ==
Date time, TV	Opponent	Result	Record	Site (attendance) city, state
Exhibition
10/28/2013*; 7:00 pm	Daemen	W 102–84		Koessler Athletic Center (1,581); Buffalo, NY
11/06/2013*; 7:00 pm	Mercyhurst	W 64–49		Koessler Athletic Center (1,130); Buffalo, NY
Regular season
11/11/2013*; 7:00 pm	South Dakota	W 71–66	1–0	Koessler Athletic Center (1,579); Buffalo, NY
11/16/2013*; 7:00 pm	at St. Bonaventure	L 64–86	1–1	Reilly Center (4,568); St. Bonaventure, NY
11/18/2013*; 7:30 pm, ESPN3	at Rutgers; NIT Season Tip-Off	L 51–66	1–2	The RAC (2,106); Piscataway, NJ
11/19/2013*; 5:00 pm	vs. Elon; NIT Season Tip-Off	W 86–85	2–2	The RAC (3,025); Piscataway, NJ
11/25/2014*; 5:00 pm	vs. Georgia State; NIT Season Tip-Off	W 79–71	3–2	Alumni Gym (844); Elon, NC
11/26/2014*; 5:00 pm	vs. No. 1 (DII) Metro State; NIT Season Tip-Off	L 69–83	3–3	Alumni Gym (577); Elon, NC
12/06/2013; 7:00 pm	Saint Peter's	W 82–67	4–3 (1–0)	Koessler Athletic Center (1,506); Buffalo, NY
12/08/2013; 2:00 pm	Siena	W 93–78	5–3 (2–0)	Koessler Athletic Center (1,555); Buffalo, NY
12/11/2013*; 8:00 pm	vs. Buffalo	W 69–55	6–3	First Niagara Center (4,703); Buffalo, NY
12/14/2013*; 4:00 pm	at St. Francis Brooklyn	L 51–67	6–4	Generoso Pope Athletic Complex (278); Brooklyn, NY
12/16/2013*; 7:00 pm	at Holy Cross	W 83–73	7–4	Hart Center (1,066); Worcester, MA
12/21/2013*; 4:15 pm	Lamar	W 87–74	8–4	Koessler Athletic Center (1,439); Buffalo, NY
12/29/2013*; 5:00 pm, ESPN3	at Notre Dame	W 87–81 ^{OT}	8–5	Purcell Pavilion (8,400); Notre Dame, IN
01/04/2014; 2:00 pm	at Saint Peter's	W 67–63	9–5 (3–0)	Yanitelli Center (143); Jersey City, NJ
01/06/2014; 7:00 pm	at Marist	L 62–65	9–6 (3–1)	McCann Field House (953); Poughkeepsie, NY
01/10/2014; 7:00 pm	Rider	W 94–91 ^{OT}	10–6 (4–1)	Koessler Athletic Center (1,226); Buffalo, NY
01/12/2014; 2:00 pm	Monmouth	W 87–67	11–6 (5–1)	Koessler Athletic Center (1,311); Buffalo, NY
01/17/2014; 9:00 pm, ESPNU	at Iona	W 85–83	12–6 (6–1)	Hynes Athletic Center (1,278); New Rochelle, NY
01/19/2014; 2:00 pm	at Monmouth	L 82–83	12–7 (6–2)	Multipurpose Activity Center (1,450); West Long Branch, NJ
01/22/2014; 7:00 pm	Niagara; Battle of the Bridge	W 87–74	13–7 (7–2)	Koessler Athletic Center (2,196); Buffalo, NY
01/26/2014; 2:00 pm	Marist	W 78–65	14–7 (8–2)	Koessler Athletic Center (1,742); Buffalo, NY
01/30/2014; 7:30 pm	at Quinnipiac	W 86–74	15–7 (9–2)	TD Bank Sports Center (N/A); Hamden, CT
02/01/2014; 1:00 pm	at Fairfield	W 84–58	16–7 (10–2)	Webster Bank Arena (1,503); Bridgeport, CT
02/07/2014; 7:00 pm, ESPNU	Manhattan	L 73–84	16–8 (10–3)	Koessler Athletic Center (2,196); Buffalo, NY
02/09/2014; 2:00 pm	Iona	L 91–101	16–9 (10–4)	Koessler Athletic Center (2,196); Buffalo, NY
02/14/2014; 9:00 pm, ESPNU	at Niagara; Battle of the Bridge	W 71–65	17–9 (11–4)	Gallagher Center (2,002); Lewiston, NY
02/16/2014; 2:00 pm	at Siena	W 92–88 ^{3OT}	18–9 (12–4)	Times Union Center (6,428); Albany, NY
02/20/2014; 7:00 pm	Quinnipiac	L 81–88	18–10 (12–5)	Koessler Athletic Center (2,196); Buffalo, NY
02/22/2014; 2:00 pm	Fairfield	W 90–78	19–10 (13–5)	Koessler Athletic Center (1,909); Buffalo, NY
02/28/2014; 7:00 pm, ESPNU	at Rider	W 79–66	20–10 (14–5)	Alumni Gymnasium (1,650); Lawrenceville, NJ
03/02/2014; 4:30 pm, ESPN3	at Manhattan	L 63–68	20–11 (14–6)	Draddy Gymnasium (2,117); Riverdale, NY
MAAC tournament
03/08/2013; 2:30 pm, ESPN3	vs. Siena; Quarterfinals	W 71–65	21–11	MassMutual Center (2,716); Springfield, MA
03/09/2013; 4:30 pm, ESPN3	vs. Iona; Semifinals	L 72–75	21–12	MassMutual Center (N/A); Springfield, MA
CIT
03/18/2014*; 7:00 pm	VMI; First round	L 100–111	21–13	Koessler Athletic Center (947); Buffalo, NY
*Non-conference game. ^{#}Rankings from AP Poll. (#) Tournament seedings in parentheses. All times are in Eastern Time.
