= 2013–14 Manhattan Jaspers basketball team =

American college basketball season

2013–14 Manhattan Jaspers basketball

MAAC Tournament champions

NCAA tournament, round of 64
- Conference: Metro Atlantic Athletic Conference
- Record: 25–8 (15–5 MAAC)
- Head coach: Steve Masiello (3rd season)
- Assistant coaches: Matt Grady; Rasheen Davis; Mathiew Wilson
- Home arena: Draddy Gymnasium

2013–14 MAAC men's basketball standings
	Conf.				Overall
Team	W		L	PCT	W		L	PCT
Iona	17	–	3	.850	22	–	11	.667
Manhattan †	15	–	5	.750	25	–	8	.758
Quinnipiac	14	–	6	.700	20	–	12	.625
Canisius	14	–	6	.700	21	–	13	.618
Siena	11	–	9	.550	20	–	18	.526
Saint Peter's	9	–	11	.450	14	–	17	.452
Rider	9	–	11	.450	14	–	17	.452
Marist	9	–	11	.450	12	–	19	.387
Monmouth	5	–	15	.250	11	–	21	.344
Fairfield	4	–	16	.200	7	–	25	.219
Niagara	3	–	17	.150	7	–	26	.212
† 2014 MAAC tournament winner

The 2013–14 Manhattan Jaspers basketball team represented Manhattan College during the 2013–14 NCAA Division I men's basketball season. Led by third-year head coach Steve Masiello, the Jaspers played their home games at Draddy Gymnasium, and wer members of the Metro Atlantic Athletic Conference (MAAC). They finished the season with a record of 25–8 overall, and 15–5 in MAAC play, securing second place in the conference. The Jaspers won the MAAC tournament earning an automatic bid to the NCAA tournament where they lost in the second round to Louisville.

== Roster ==
2013–14 Manhattan Jaspers men's basketball team
#	Name	Position	Height	Weight	Year	Hometown
0	Shane Richards	Forward	6–5	185	Sophomore	New York City, New York
1	C. J. Jones	Guard	6–0	175	Sophomore	Chicago, Illinois
2	Tyler Wilson	Guard	6–0	175	Freshman	The Bronx, New York
5	Rhamel Brown	Forward/Center	6–7	230	Senior	Brooklyn, New York
12	RaShawn Stores	Guard	5–11	190	Junior	The Bronx, New York
13	Emmy Andújar	Forward	6–6	205	Junior	The Bronx, New York
15	Adam Lacey	Center	6–10	230	Sophomore	Chula Vista, California
23	Rich Williams	Guard	6–5	190	Freshman	Brooklyn, New York
24	George Beamon	Guard/Forward	6–4	175	Senior	Roslyn, New York
30	Ashton Pankey	Forward	6–10	225	Sophomore	The Bronx, New York
31	Michael Alvarado	Guard	6–2	180	Senior	The Bronx, New York
32	Carlton Allen	Center	6–10	240	Freshman	Ewing, New Jersey
33	Donovan Kates	Guard	6–6	200	Junior	Hopkinsville, Kentucky

== Schedule ==
Date time, TV	Rank^{#}	Opponent^{#}	Result	Record	Site (attendance) city, state
Exhibition
11/01/2013*; 7:00 pm		Nyack	W 87–61		Draddy Gymnasium (1,346); Riverdale, NY
Regular season
11/09/2013*; 2:00 pm		at La Salle	W 99–90 ^{OT}	1–0	Tom Gola Arena (3,400); Philadelphia, PA
11/12/2013*; 7:00 pm		at Columbia	W 71–70	2–0	Levien Gymnasium (1,277); New York City, NY
11/16/2013*; 7:00 pm		George Washington	L 74–80	2–1	Draddy Gymnasium (2,302); Riverdale, NY
11/20/2013*; 8:00 pm		at Illinois State	W 79–70	3–1	Redbird Arena (4,690); Normal, IL
11/26/2013*; 7:00 pm		Fordham; Battle of the Bronx	L 75–79	3–2	Draddy Gymnasium (2,520); Riverdale, NY
11/30/2013*; 4:00 pm		at Hofstra	W 66–59	4–2	Mack Sports Complex (1,658); Hempstead, NY
12/06/2013; 7:00 pm		at Marist	W 70–59	5–2 (1–0)	McCann Field House (1,588); Poughkeepsie, NY
12/08/2013; 2:00 pm		Monmouth	W 75–66	6–2 (2–0)	Draddy Gymnasium (1,428); Riverdale, NY
12/15/2013*; 2:00 pm		at UNC Wilmington	W 77–72	7–2	Trask Coliseum (3,411); Wilmington, NC
12/17/2013*; 7:00 pm		at South Carolina	W 86–68	8–2	Colonial Life Arena (7,573); Columbia, SC
12/21/2013*; 3:00 pm		vs. Buffalo; Brooklyn Hoops Holiday Invitational	W 84–81 ^{OT}	9–2	Barclays Center (11,039); Brooklyn, NY
01/02/2014; 7:00 pm		at Saint Peter's	W 74–62	10–2 (3–0)	Yanitelli Center (163); Jersey City, NJ
01/04/2014; 7:00 pm		Fairfield	W 83–57	11–2 (4–0)	Draddy Gymnasium (1,712); Riverdale, NY
01/09/2014; 7:00 pm, SNY		at Quinnipiac	L 76–81	11–3 (4–1)	TD Bank Sports Center (2,038); Hamden, CT
01/12/2014; 2:00 pm		Marist	W 86–79 ^{OT}	12–3 (5–1)	Draddy Gymnasium (2,212); Riverdale, NY
01/16/2014; 7:00 pm		Siena	W 90–68	13–3 (6–1)	Draddy Gymnasium (1,587); Riverdale, NY
01/18/2014; 1:30 pm, SNY		at Fairfield	L 67–71	13–4 (6–2)	Webster Bank Arena (2,135); Bridgeport, CT
01/24/2014; 7:00 pm, ESPNU		Rider	W 67–51	14–4 (7–2)	Draddy Gymnasium (1,632); Riverdale, NY
01/26/2014; 2:00 pm		Quinnipiac	L 86–90 ^{OT}	14–5 (7–3)	Draddy Gymnasium (2,254); Riverdale, NY
01/31/2014; 7:00 pm, ESPNU		at Iona	L 73–85	14–6 (7–4)	Hynes Athletic Center (2,611); New Rochelle, NY
02/04/2014; 7:00 pm		Saint Peter's	W 64–49	15–6 (8–4)	Draddy Gymnasium (1,273); Riverdale, NY
02/07/2014; 7:00 pm, ESPNU		at Canisius	W 84–73	16–6 (9–4)	Koessler Athletic Center (2,196); Buffalo, NY
02/09/2014; 2:00 pm		at Niagara	W 78–77	17–6 (10–4)	Gallagher Center (1,305); Lewiston, NY
02/13/2014; 7:00 pm		at Rider	W 86–69	18–6 (11–4)	Alumni Gymnasium (1,213); Lawrenceville, NJ
02/16/2014; 2:00 pm		Niagara	W 90–72	19–6 (12–4)	Draddy Gymnasium (1,312); Riverdale, NY
02/16/2014; 2:00 pm		at Monmouth	W 75–61	20–6 (13–4)	Multipurpose Activity Center (1,630); West Long Branch, NJ
02/21/2014; 7:00 pm		at Siena	L 63–67	20–7 (13–5)	Times Union Center (7,928); Albany, NY
02/28/2014; 7:00 pm, ESPN2		Iona	W 80–77	21–7 (14–5)	Draddy Gymnasium (2,520); Riverdale, NY
03/02/2014; 4:30 pm, ESPN3		Canisius	W 68–63	22–7 (15–5)	Draddy Gymnasium (2,117); Riverdale, NY
MAAC tournament
03/08/2014; 6:30 pm, ESPN3		vs. Saint Peter's; Quarterfinals	W 72–58	23–7	MassMutual Center (1,645); Springfield, MA
03/09/2014; 7:00 pm, ESPN3		vs. Quinnipiac; Semifinals	W 87–68	24–7	MassMutual Center (N/A); Springfield, MA
03/10/2014; 7:00 pm, ESPN2		vs. Iona; Championship	W 71–68	25–7	MassMutual Center (1,749); Springfield, MA
NCAA tournament
03/20/2014*; 9:45 pm, TNT	No. (13 MW)	vs. No. 5 (4 MW) Louisville; Second round	L 64–71	25–8	Amway Center (14,866); Orlando, FL
*Non-conference game. ^{#}Rankings from AP Poll, (#) during NCAA Tournament is seed within region MW=Midwest. (#) Tournament seedings in parentheses. All times are in Eastern Time.
