= Jeff Bower (basketball) =

American basketball coach

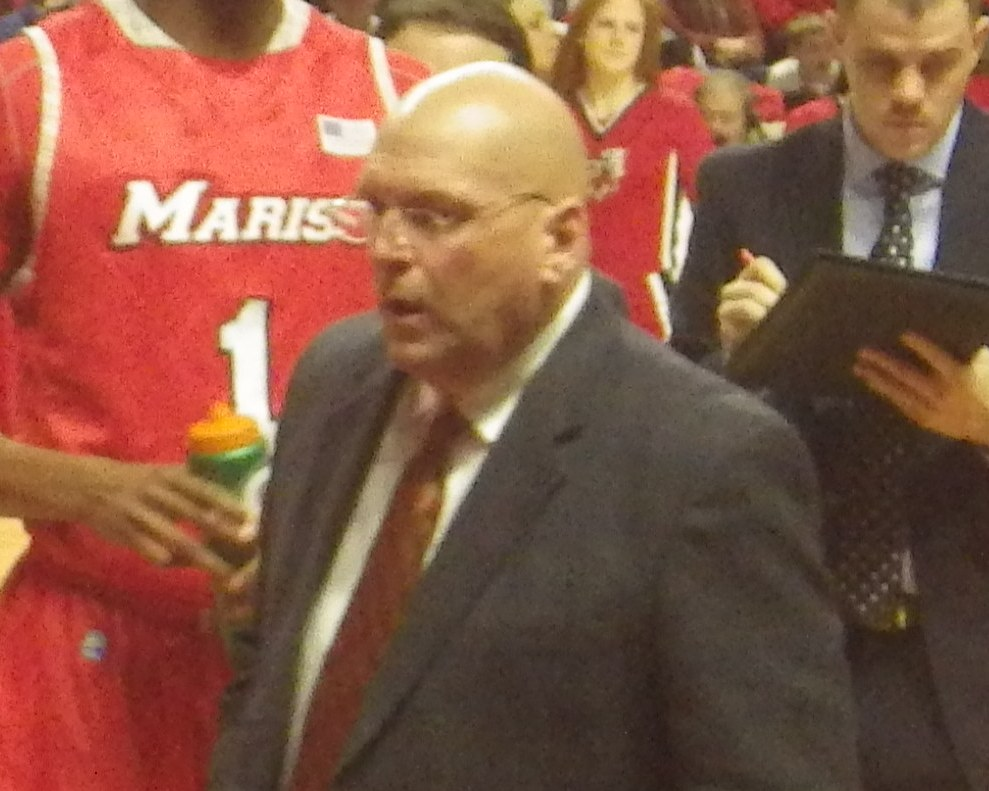

Personal information
- Born: April 26, 1961 (age 65) Hollidaysburg, Pennsylvania, U.S.

Career information
- College: Saint Francis
- Coaching career: 1983–present

Career history

Coaching
- 1983–1986: Penn State (assistant)
- 1986–1995: Marist (assistant)
- 2009–2010: New Orleans Hornets
- 2013–2014: Marist

Jeffrey Bower (born April 26, 1961) is an American professional basketball coach and executive who last served as the vice president of basketball operations for the Phoenix Suns. Bower was also the former general manager for the Detroit Pistons from 2014 to 2018. He also served as the general manager and head coach of the New Orleans Hornets. Bower held the Hornets head coaching position during most of the 2009–10 season, and the general manager position twice, in 2002–03 and from 2005 to 2010.

== New Orleans Hornets ==
=== General manager ===
Bower helped rebuild the Hornets, despite the troubles Hurricane Katrina placed on the club and the city of New Orleans in general. He took a giant step in re-writing Hornets history by trading franchise piece Baron Davis to the Warriors, then selecting guard Chris Paul fourth overall in the 2005 NBA draft. The disaster Katrina caused forced the Hornets to move to Oklahoma City until the 2007–08 NBA season, but Bower continued to build his club. Through trade, draft, and signings, the Hornets actually competed in their two seasons in Oklahoma with a 38–44 record in 2005–06 and 39–43 in 2006–07. Yet again, another series of trials and tribulations, the Hornets improved and contended. Injuries to Paul (for 18 games), Peja Stojaković (for sixty-nine), and scoring big man David West (for thirty) dampened the opportunity to make the playoffs.

For 2007–08, the Hornets came back home to open arms. They broke out, with the dangerous roster of Tyson Chandler (whom Bower traded for in 2006 for J. R. Smith), Paul, Stojakovic, West, and new acquisition Morris Peterson (from Toronto), with pieces like 3-point specialists Rasual Butler and Jannero Pargo (the former acquired in a 2005 trade, the latter left prior to the 2008–09 NBA season) and rebounders Melvin Ely and Ryan Bowen; and developing youth such as Julian Wright and Hilton Armstrong (both draft picks of the Hornets). The general of it all was Coach of the Year Byron Scott prior to the 2004–05 NBA season, and the Hornets won 56 games, their first divisional title, and were labeled "contender" by many analysts.

Bower's performance in spearheading the Hornets from lottery team to contender gave him 12 votes from the sportswriters for the Sporting News NBA Executive of the Year, behind Lakers' GM Mitch Kupchak and winner, Boston Celtics' Danny Ainge.

Bower helped draft David West, J. R. Smith, Chris Paul, Darren Collison and Marcus Thornton. Bower had been with the organization for 14 years, beginning in 1995–96, director of scouting, director of player personnel, as a scout, GM (in 2002–03), and assistant to former coaches Paul Silas and Tim Floyd. Bowers served as an advance scout for the Charlotte Hornets in 1995–97 and the Hornets Director of Scouting in 1997–2009. He also was an associate head coach at Marist College from 1990 to 1995, prior to that, being an assistant coach at both Marist and Penn State University.

=== Head coach ===
On November 12, 2009, Bower was made the head coach of the team after the firing of Byron Scott. He led the team to a 34–39 record despite injury problems in the team. At the end of the season, he stepped down from the coaching duty and returned to his position as a general manager. He was replaced by Monty Williams. Bower and the Hornets parted ways on July 13, 2010.

== Marist ==
On April 10, 2013, it was announced that he will take over as coach of the Marist College men's basketball team. Bower served as an assistant coach for the Red Foxes from 1986 to 1990 and served as the associate head coach from 1990 to 1995. He was involved in the team's 1987 NCAA Tournament appearance and ECAC Metro Conference regular-season championships in 1987 and 1988. Bower also aided in the development of Rik Smits, the second overall pick in the 1988 NBA Draft by the Indiana Pacers.

== Detroit Pistons ==
On June 3, 2014, Bower was named the general manager of the Detroit Pistons. On June 13, 2016, the Pistons signed Bower to a contract extension. Under Bower, the Pistons reached the playoffs in his second season as the general manager. However, on June 1, 2018, Bower was fired from his position as general manager of the team.

== Phoenix Suns ==
On April 11, 2019, Bower was named a senior vice president of basketball operations for the Phoenix Suns Under this new title, Bower helped relay certain information towards general manager James Jones whenever necessary. In his second and final season with the Suns, they not only reached the NBA playoffs for the first time since 2010, but also the NBA Finals for the first time since 1993. Bower mutually agreed to resign from his position on July 24, 2021.

== Personal life ==
Bower and his wife, Lisa and have a daughter, Lindsey, born in January 2003. Lindsey now attends Physical Therapy school through the Feinberg School of Medicine and Northwestern University in Chicago. He holds a Bachelor of Arts degree in history and education from Saint Francis University in Pennsylvania.

== Head coaching record ==
=== NBA ===
Legend
Regular season	G	Games coached	W	Games won	L	Games lost	W–L %	Win–loss %
Playoffs	PG	Playoff games	PW	Playoff wins	PL	Playoff losses	PW–L %	Playoff win–loss %

Team	Year	G	W	L	W–L%	Finish	PG	PW	PL	PW–L%	Result
New Orleans	2009–10	73	34	39	.466	5th in Southwest	—	—	—	—	Missed Playoffs
Career		73	34	39	.466		—	—	—	—	

=== College ===
Record table
Season	Team	Overall	Conference	Standing	Postseason
Marist Red Foxes (Metro Atlantic Athletic Conference) (2013–2014)
2013–14	Marist	12–19	9–11	8th	
Marist:		12–19	9–11		
Total:		12–19			
