= List of American Eagles men's basketball head coaches =

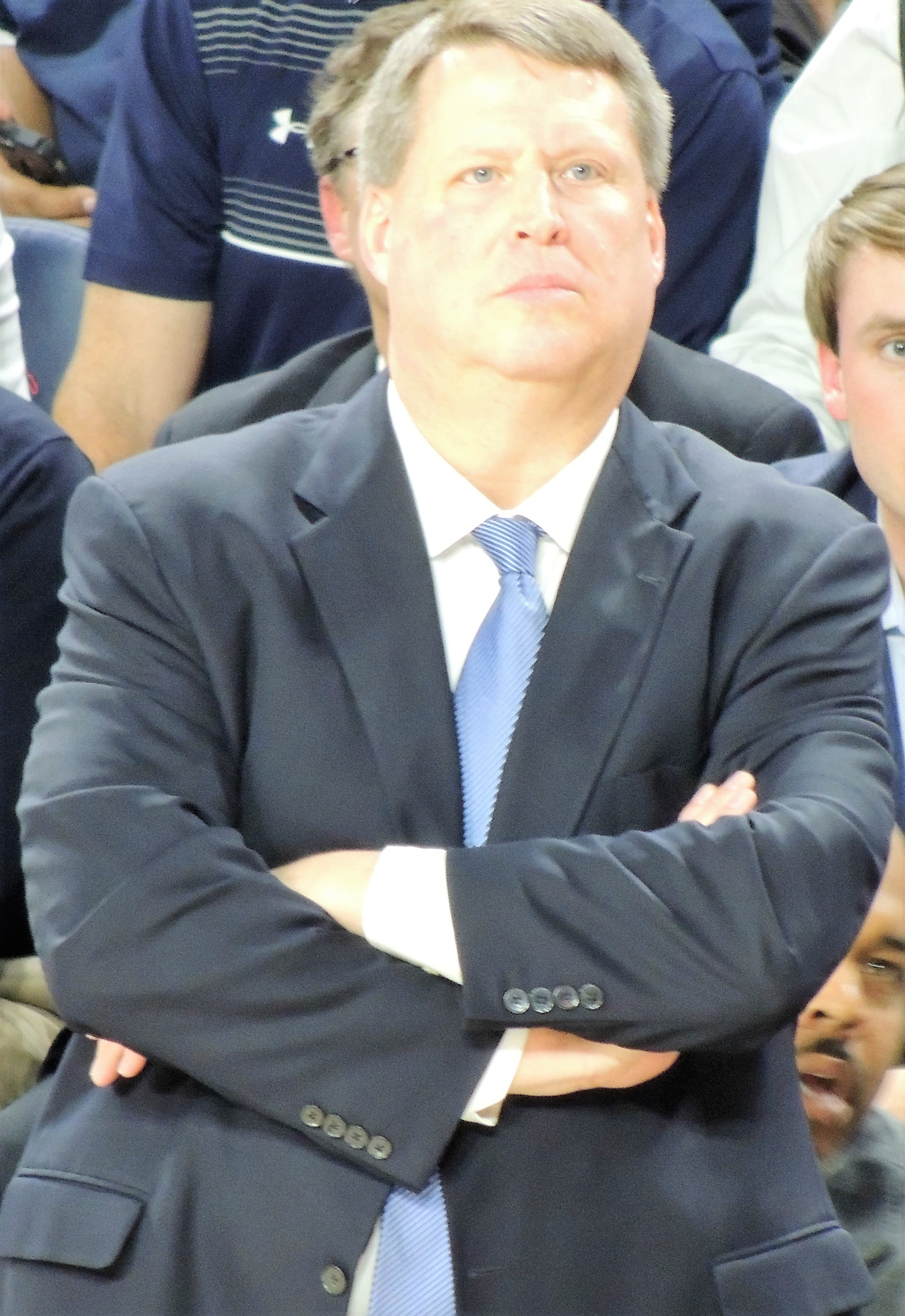
Jeff Jones, the winningest head coach in American Eagles basketball history.

The American Eagles men's basketball program has had 19 coaches in its 97-season history.

American's current head coach is Duane Simpkins. He was hired in April 2023 to replace Mike Brennan, who was fired at the end of the 2022–23 season.

No.	Tenure	Coach	Years	Record	Pct.
1	1926–1929	George Springston	3	30–20	.600
2	1929–1936	Walter H. Young	7	46–56	.451
3	1936–1937	Paul Smith	1	8–9	.471
4	1937–1942; 1946–1952	Stafford Cassell	11	150–78	.658
5	1942–1944	Cal Kalijarvi	2	9–18	.333
6	1944–1946	Arthur Boyd	2	32–5	.865
7	1952–1956	Dutch Schulze	4	60–53	.531
8	1956–1962	David Carrasco	6	101–51	.664
9	1962–1965	Jimmy Williams	3	20–51	.282
10	1965–1969	Alan Kyber	4	42–53	.442
11	1969–1973	Tom Young	4	61–37	.622
12	1973–1978	Jim Lynam	5	70–61	.534
13	1978–1982	Gary Williams	4	72–42	.632
14	1982–1990	Ed Tapscott	8	109–117	.482
15	1990–1997	Chris Knoche	7	77–118	.395
16	1997–2000	Art Perry	3	27–48	.360
17	2000–2013	Jeff Jones	13	212–182	.538
18	2013–2023	Mike Brennan	10	125–166	.430
19	2023–present	Duane Simpkins	3	54–45	.545
Totals		19 coaches	100 seasons	1,305–1,220	.517
Records updated through end of 2025–26 season Source
