= Wil Jones (basketball coach) =

American basketball player and coach

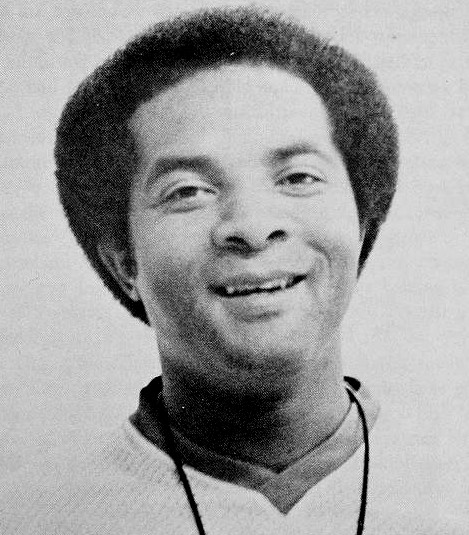

Biographical details
- Born: October 26, 1938; Washington, D.C., U.S.
- Died: March 12, 2014 (aged 75); Virginia Beach, Virginia, U.S.

Playing career
- 1957–1960: American
- Position: Point guard

Coaching career (HC unless noted)
- 1971–1976: Robinson Secondary School
- 1976–1979: Maryland (assistant)
- 1979–1988, 1993–1999: District of Columbia
- 1999–2002: Norfolk State

Accomplishments and honors

Championships
- NCAA Division II championship (1982)

Awards
- First-team College Division All-American (1960)

William Stigler Jones (October 26, 1938 – March 12, 2014) was an American basketball player and coach from Washington D.C. known for his flamboyance as a championship college basketball coach. He was known for his coaching tenures at the University of the District of Columbia (UDC) and Norfolk State University.

== Biography ==
=== Playing career ===
==== Dunbar High School ====
As a star at Dunbar High School (DC), he was known as Willie Jones and developed into Washington D.C.’s finest jump shooter and led the city in scoring in 1956.

==== American University Eagles ====
In 1957, Jones joined former Spingarn H.S star Dick Wells on DC’s first racially integrated college basketball team under Mexican American coach David Carrasco at American University.

Wells and Jones led the American University Eagles (AU) to three consecutive Mason-Dixon and Eastern Regional championships. During the summers, Willie held his own on the District’s competitive playgrounds against such future NBA Hall of Famers as Wilt Chamberlain and Elgin Baylor. One observer remembers “Willie Jones, whose skills and verbosity made him a D.C. playground legend in the 1950s — he’s known as the city’s original trash talker — is remembered as the most colorful performer in the Baylor and Chamberlain games.” He had tremendous self confidence and once told the Washington Post, “When I went to a tournament the first thing I asked was, ‘Where’s the MVP trophy? Because that’s gonna be in my case tomorrow.’ ”

Jones repeatedly broke AU and conference scoring records and in 1959 his court wizardry gave AU its greatest athletic hour when he pumped in 30 points to lead Carrasco’s team to their first victory over Georgetown, 94–67.

In the elite eight 1960 NCAA tournament Willie set a record in scoring an astonishing 54 points (before the 3 point line was installed) against National Champion (Division II) Evansville on their home court.

Jones was named to the first-team, All-American College Division squad that year and invited to the Olympic Trials in Denver, Colorado. The Eagles retired his number after his career was over, joining Kermit Washington N.B.A star as the only other AU player with that honor.

Following his college career, he played for the Baltimore Bullets of the Eastern Professional Basketball league along with Bill Spivey and Sherman White. Georgetown coach John Thompson said of his ability “The tiny scoring guard Wil Jones could have been great in the N.B.A. Little Wil was a shooter’s shooter, talked a whole lot of trash, and always backed it up.”

=== Coaching career ===
==== Robinson Secondary School ====
Following his playing career, he became winning a high school coach for Robinson Secondary School., as the first African American coach in Northern Virginia. According to one journalist he became “the most entertaining coach in the history of Northern Virginia, or of the whole area for that matter.”,

==== Maryland Terrapins and University of the District of Columbia ====
After a stint as an assistant for Lefty Driesell at Maryland, where he recruited excellent African American players, Jones was named head coach at the University of the District of Columbia in 1979 and won the 1982 Division II national title. Sports Illustrated noted Wil Jones’ recruiting talent, "In the most amazing recruiting coup the college game has seen in recent years, the coach persuaded 6'11", 215-pound Earl Jones (no relation), the most highly publicized high school player in the nation last season, to forsake the glamorous heavyweights of Division I for Division II UDC." Earl Jones had been recruited by the top programs in the country, but had an uncertain academic future.

Wil Jones is appreciated for hiring NCAA’s first Female Assistant Basketball Coach Cheryl Roberts at UDC in 1981.

Coach Jones also recruited leaper Michael Britt who teamed with Earl Jones to lead the UDC Firebirds back to back NCAA Division II Final Fours, where they were runners-up in 1983.

In 1988, eligibility irregularities were found in Jones' UDC program. The school had to forfeit 11 games for playing an ineligible transfer and he was reassigned and then fired. However, after five years Jones was reinstated as head coach by legal order.

==== Norfolk State Spartans ====
In 1999, Jones moved to Norfolk State, citing a desire to coach at the Division I level. He was head coach for the Spartans for three seasons, compiling a record of 34–52.

=== Death ===
Wil Jones died of Pancreatic cancer in Virginia Beach, Virginia on March 12, 2014. John Thompson sums up Wil Jones’ personality and basketball status in the Washington D.C. area when he told Sports Illustrated in 1980, “He was the Muhammad Ali of basketball. He was an extremely confident person on the court, and he could be very aggravating, but I like him.”

=== Family ===
Jones' brother Frank Jones, Sr. resides in Maryland. His wife Gail Tate-Jones resides in Virginia Beach. He has one son William S. Jones Jr. and three grandsons (Los Angeles California) and nephews Frank Jones Jr, Frank Jones III, nieces Tia Jones and Kristy Jones of Maryland.
