= Walter H. Young =

American football and basketball coach

Biographical details
- Born: Zanesville, Ohio, U.S.

Playing career

Football
- 1921–1923: Ohio Wesleyan
- Position(s): End

Coaching career (HC unless noted)

Football
- 1924–1928: Chillicothe HS (OH)
- 1929–1936: American

Basketball
- 1924–1929: Chillicothe HS (OH)
- 1929–1936: American

Track and field
- 1924–1929: Chillicothe HS (OH)

Administrative career (AD unless noted)
- 1929–1937: American

Walter H. Young was an American football and basketball coach, athletics administrator, and educator. He served as the head football and basketball coach at American University in Washington, D.C. from 1929 to 1936.

Young was born in Zanesville, Ohio. He attended Ohio Wesleyan University, where played football as an end and in the backfield from 1921 to 1923. After graduating from Ohio Wesleyan in 1924, he was hired as an athletic coach and history teacher at Chillicothe High School in Chillicothe, Ohio. Young coached football, basketball, and track and field at Chillicothe. In 1929, he was appointed by American University as assistant professor of physical education and the school's first full-time athletic director. He succeeded George Springston as American's athletic coach. Young resigned from his post at American in early 1937.
