= 2013–14 American Eagles men's basketball team =

American college basketball season

2013–14 American Eagles men's basketball

Patriot League Tournament champions

NCAA tournament, round of 64
- Conference: Patriot League
- Record: 20–13 (13–5 Patriot)
- Head coach: Mike Brennan (1st season)
- Assistant coaches: Scott Greenman; Nate Philippe; Matt Wolff
- Home arena: Bender Arena

2013–14 Patriot League men's basketball standings
	Conf.				Overall
Team	W		L	PCT	W		L	PCT
Boston University	15	–	3	.833	24	–	11	.686
American †	13	–	5	.722	20	–	13	.606
Holy Cross	12	–	6	.667	20	–	14	.588
Bucknell	11	–	7	.611	16	–	14	.533
Army	10	–	8	.556	15	–	16	.484
Lehigh	7	–	11	.389	14	–	18	.438
Colgate	6	–	12	.333	13	–	18	.419
Loyola (MD)	6	–	12	.333	11	–	19	.367
Lafayette	6	–	12	.333	11	–	20	.355
Navy	4	–	14	.222	9	–	21	.300
† 2014 Patriot League tournament winner

The 2013–14 American Eagles men's basketball team represented American University during the 2013–14 NCAA Division I men's basketball season. The Eagles, led by first year head coach Mike Brennan, played their home games at Bender Arena and were members of the Patriot League. They finished the season 20–13, 13–5 in Patriot League play to finish in second place. They were champions of the Patriot League tournament to earn an automatic bid to the NCAA tournament where they lost in the first round to Wisconsin.

== Roster ==
Number	Name	Position	Height	Weight	Year	Hometown
0	Darius Gardner	Guard	5–9	165	RS–Junior	Houston, Texas
1	Kyle Kager	Forward	6–8	195	Junior	Flower Mound, Texas
2	Kade Kager	Guard	6–3	200	Freshman	Flower Mound, Texas
3	Justice Montgomery	Guard	5–11	160	Junior	Orlando, Florida
4	Austin Carroll	Guard	6–3	210	RS–Junior	Bedford, Massachusetts
5	Marko Vasic	Guard/Forward	6–5	200	Sophomore	Belgrade, Serbia
12	Yilret Yiljep	Forward	6–7	235	Freshman	Kaduna, Nigeria
13	Kevin Panzer	Forward	6–9	225	RS–Senior	Mission Viejo, California
14	Jesse Reed	Guard/Forward	6–5	185	Sophomore	Saltsburg, Pennsylvania
20	Charlie Jones	Guard/Forward	6–5	185	Freshman	Manchester, Maryland
21	Jalen Rhea	Guard	6–2	205	Freshman	New Albany, Ohio
22	John Schoof	Guard/Forward	6–5	205	Junior	Fairfax, Virginia
25	Langdon Neal	Guard	6–0	165	Freshman	Chicago, Illinois
33	Jordan Borucki	Guard	6–4	195	RS–Senior	Los Angeles, California
34	Tony Wroblicky	Center	6–10	230	Senior	Harbor City, California
35	Jonathan Davis	Forward	6–7	220	RS–Junior	Simi Valley, California
44	Zach Elcano	Center	6–11	230	Sophomore	Centreville, Virginia

== Schedule ==
Date time, TV	Rank^{#}	Opponent^{#}	Result	Record	Site (attendance) city, state
Regular season
Nov 8*; 7:00 pm		at George Mason	L 60–63	0–1	Patriot Center (6,602); Fairfax, VA
Nov 14*; 7:30 pm, CSNMA		UMBC	W 63–61 ^{OT}	1–1	Bender Arena (1,178); Washington, D.C.
Nov 20*; 7:30 pm, BTN		at No. 8 Ohio State	L 52–63	1–2	Value City Arena (14,639); Columbus, OH
Nov 23*; 4:00 pm		at Mount St. Mary's	L 64–68	1–3	Knott Arena (1,656); Emmitsburg, MD
Nov 26*; 7:00 pm		at Columbia	L 47–61	1–4	Levien Gymnasium (1,022); New York City, NY
Nov 30*; 2:00 pm		at Saint Francis (PA)	W 75–43	2–4	DeGol Arena (942); Loretto, PA
Dec 4*; 7:30 pm		Howard	W 76–53	3–4	Bender Arena (802); Washington, D.C.
Dec 7*; 2:00 pm, CSNMA+		Brown	L 67–72	3–5	Bender Arena (1,728); Washington, D.C.
Dec 19*; 10:00 pm		at Saint Mary's	L 44–58	3–6	McKeon Pavilion (2,148); Moraga, CA
Dec 22*; 5:00 pm		at San Francisco	L 69–77	3–7	War Memorial Gymnasium (1,357); San Francisco, CA
Dec 29*; 2:00 pm		at Maryland Eastern Shore	W 71–58	4–7	Hytche Athletic Center (229); Princess Anne, MD
Jan 2; 7:00 pm		at Bucknell	W 67–57	5–7 (1–0)	Sojka Pavilion (2,367); Lewisburg, PA
Jan 5; 1:00 pm		at Holy Cross	W 69–54	6–7 (2–0)	Hart Center (1,138); Worcester, MA
Jan 8; 7:30 pm		Loyola (MD)	W 65–51	7–7 (3–0)	Bender Arena (703); Washington, D.C.
Jan 11; 2:00 pm		at Colgate	W 69–62	8–7 (4–0)	Cotterell Court (509); Hamilton, NY
Jan 15; 7:00 pm		at Lehigh	W 65–63	9–7 (5–0)	Stabler Arena (979); Bethlehem, PA
Jan 18; 2:00 pm, CSNMA+		Lafayette	W 66–61	10–7 (6–0)	Bender Arena (2,676); Washington, D.C.
Jan 22; 7:30 pm		Boston University	W 86–56	11–7 (7–0)	Bender Arena (2,268); Washington, D.C.
Jan 25; 4:00 pm		at Army	W 84–74	12–7 (8–0)	Christl Arena (2,237); West Point, NY
Jan 29; 7:30 pm		Navy	W 74–52	13–7 (9–0)	Bender Arena (1,528); Washington, D.C.
Feb 1; 1:00 pm		Holy Cross	W 63–57	14–7 (10–0)	Bender Arena (2,538); Washington, D.C.
Feb 5; 7:30 pm		at Loyola (MD)	L 58–62	14–8 (10–1)	Reitz Arena (652); Baltimore, MD
Feb 8; 2:00 pm		Colgate	L 60–63	14–9 (10–2)	Bender Arena (2,321); Washington, D.C.
Feb 12; 7:30 pm		Lehigh	W 64–44	15–9 (11–2)	Bender Arena (703); Washington, D.C.
Feb 15; 2:00 pm		at Lafayette	L 62–74	15–10 (11–3)	Kirby Sports Center (2,134); Easton, PA
Feb 19; 7:00 pm		at Boston University	L 62–71	15–11 (11–4)	Agganis Arena (1,262); Boston, MA
Feb 22; 2:00 pm, CSNMA+		Army	W 58–54	16–11 (12–4)	Bender Arena (1,788); Washington, D.C.
Feb 26; 7:00 pm		at Navy	W 64–55	17–11 (13–4)	Alumni Hall (1,321); Annapolis, MD
Mar 1; 2:00 pm, CBSSN		Bucknell	L 51–56	17–12 (13–5)	Bender Arena (2,879); Washington, D.C.
Patriot League tournament
Mar 5; 7:30 pm		Colgate; Quarterfinals	W 59–50	18–12	Bender Arena (913); Washington, D.C.
Mar 8; 5:30 pm, CBSSN		Holy Cross; Semifinals	W 57–46	19–12	Bender Arena (1,403); Washington, D.C.
Mar 12; 7:30 pm, CBSSN		at Boston University; Championship	W 55–36	20–12	Agganis Arena (2,633); Boston, MA
NCAA tournament
Mar 20*; 12:40 pm, truTV	(15 W)	vs. (2 W) No. 12 Wisconsin; Second round	L 35–75	20–13	BMO Harris Bradley Center (17,749); Milwaukee, WI
*Non-conference game. ^{#}Rankings from AP Poll. (#) Tournament seedings in parentheses. All times are in Eastern Time. (#) during NCAA Tournament is seed within region W=West.
