= 2013–14 Navy Midshipmen men's basketball team =

American college basketball season

2013–14 Navy Midshipmen men's basketball
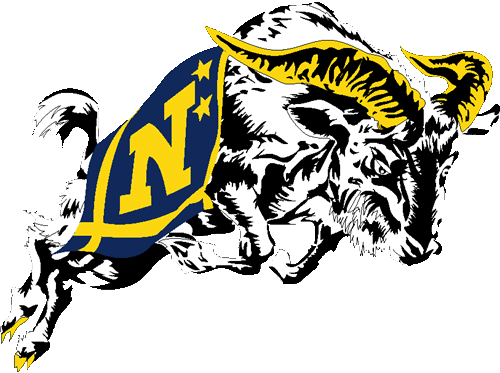
- Conference: Patriot League
- Record: 9–21 (4–14 Patriot)
- Head coach: Ed DeChellis (3rd season)
- Assistant coaches: Dan Earl; Ernie Nestor; Aaron Goodman; Kendrick Saunders; Jon Perry
- Home arena: Alumni Hall

2013–14 Patriot League men's basketball standings
| | Conf. | | | | Overall |
| Team | W | | L | PCT | W | | L | PCT |
|---|---|---|---|---|---|---|---|---|
| Boston University | 15 | – | 3 | .833 | 24 | – | 11 | .686 |
| American † | 13 | – | 5 | .722 | 20 | – | 13 | .606 |
| Holy Cross | 12 | – | 6 | .667 | 20 | – | 14 | .588 |
| Bucknell | 11 | – | 7 | .611 | 16 | – | 14 | .533 |
| Army | 10 | – | 8 | .556 | 15 | – | 16 | .484 |
| Lehigh | 7 | – | 11 | .389 | 14 | – | 18 | .438 |
| Colgate | 6 | – | 12 | .333 | 13 | – | 18 | .419 |
| Loyola (MD) | 6 | – | 12 | .333 | 11 | – | 19 | .367 |
| Lafayette | 6 | – | 12 | .333 | 11 | – | 20 | .355 |
| Navy | 4 | – | 14 | .222 | 9 | – | 21 | .300 |
† 2014 Patriot League tournament winner

The 2013–14 Navy Midshipmen men's basketball team represented the United States Naval Academy during the 2013–14 NCAA Division I men's basketball season. The Midshipmen, led by third-year head coach Ed DeChellis, played their home games at Alumni Hall and were members of the Patriot League. They finished the season 9–21, 4–14 in Patriot League play to finish in last place. They lost in the first round of the Patriot League tournament to Colgate.

== Roster ==
| Number | Name | Position | Height | Weight | Year | Hometown |
|---|---|---|---|---|---|---|
| 0 | Will Kelly | Forward | 6–9 | 226 | Sophomore | Mount Laurel Township, New Jersey |
| 1 | Kendall Knorr | Guard | 6–3 | 197 | Sophomore | Concord, North Carolina |
| 3 | James Loupos | Forward | 6–6 | 206 | Senior | Skillman, New Jersey |
| 5 | Kevin Alter | Guard | 5–6 | 147 | Junior | Rumson, New Jersey |
| 10 | Tilman Dunbar | Guard | 5–10 | 155 | Sophomore | Woodbridge, Virginia |
| 11 | Thurgood Wynn | Guard | 6–3 | 182 | Senior | Bethesda, Maryland |
| 12 | Zach Fong | Guard | 5–11 | 152 | Freshman | Woodbridge, Virginia |
| 14 | Earl McLaurin | Guard | 5–10 | 173 | Junior | Charlotte, North Carolina |
| 15 | Payne Andrus | Guard | 5–11 | 165 | Freshman | Willis, Texas |
| 21 | Worth Smith | Forward | 6–6 | 202 | Junior | Mooresville, North Carolina |
| 22 | Grant Vermeer | Guard | 6–2 | 192 | Freshman | Mountain View, California |
| 24 | Phil Guglielmo | Guard | 6–5 | 181 | Sophomore | Springfield, Virginia |
| 25 | Michael Brown | Guard | 6–4 | 206 | Freshman | Horsham, Pennsylvania |
| 31 | Enuoma Ebinum | Forward | 6–9 | 210 | Freshman | Lanham, Maryland |
| 32 | James Hemphill | Forward | 6–6 | 200 | Freshman | Raleigh, North Carolina |
| 33 | Brandon Venturini | Guard | 6–0 | 184 | Junior | Allendale, Michigan |
| 34 | Kyle Quintana | Guard | 5–11 | 187 | Freshman | Allendale, Michigan |
| 35 | Tim Abruzzo | Guard | 6–3 | 175 | Freshman | Perkasie, Pennsylvania |
| 44 | Jerome Alexander | Forward | 6–6 | 204 | Sophomore | Radford, Virginia |
| 55 | Edward Alade | Forward/Center | 6–9 | 216 | Freshman | Houston, Texas |

== Schedule ==
| Date time, TV | Opponent | Result | Record | Site (attendance) city, state |
Regular season
| Nov 8*; 7:30 pm | at Towson | L 45–72 | 0–1 | Tiger Arena (4,262); Towson, MD |
| Nov 11*; 7:00 pm | vs. Saint Francis (PA) | L 57–60 | 0–2 | Cambria County War Memorial Arena (2,838); Johnstown, PA |
| Nov 13*; 7:00 pm | Goucher | W 98–47 | 1–2 | Alumni Hall (1,106); Annapolis, MD |
| Nov 16*; 2:00 pm | at Binghamton | W 68–50 | 2–2 | Binghamton University Events Center (2,625); Vestal, NY |
| Nov 19*; 7:00 pm, ESFC | at Virginia | L 42–67 | 2–3 | John Paul Jones Arena (9,764); Charlottesville, VA |
| Nov 23*; 7:00 pm | UMBC | W 73–58 | 3–3 | Alumni Hall (1,908); Annapolis, MD |
| Nov 26*; 7:00 pm | UMES | W 67–59 | 4–3 | Alumni Hall (1,220); Annapolis, MD |
| Dec 4*; 7:00 pm | The Citadel | W 79–74 | 5–3 | Alumni Hall (755); Annapolis, MD |
| Dec 14*; 12:30 pm | at Bryant | L 80–90 ^{OT} | 5–4 | Chace Athletic Center (998); Smithfield, RI |
| Dec 21*; 12:00 pm | at Northern Kentucky | L 65–72 | 5–5 | The Bank of Kentucky Center (1,572); Highland Heights, KY |
| Dec 30*; 7:00 pm | at UMBC | L 48–63 | 5–6 | Retriever Activities Center (1,672); Catonsville, MD |
| Jan 2; 7:30 pm | at Loyola (MD) | L 57–63 ^{OT} | 5–7 (0–1) | Reitz Arena (536); Baltimore, MD |
| Jan 5; 2:00 pm | Lafayette | W 79–71 | 6–7 (1–1) | Alumni Hall (2,405); Annapolis, MD |
| Jan 7; 7:00 pm | at Boston University | L 32–55 | 6–8 (1–2) | Agganis Arena (359); Boston, MA |
| Jan 11; 4:00 pm, CBSSN | Army | L 55–60 | 6–9 (1–3) | Alumni Hall (5,528); Annapolis, MD |
| Jan 15; 7:00 pm | Bucknell | W 62–61 | 7–9 (2–3) | Alumni Hall (1,079); Annapolis, MD |
| Jan 18; 2:00 pm | at Colgate | L 41–63 | 7–10 (2–4) | Cotterell Court (598); Hamilton, NY |
| Jan 22; 7:00 pm | Lehigh | L 66–68 ^{OT} | 7–11 (2–5) | Alumni Hall (605); Annapolis, MD |
| Jan 25; 7:00 pm | Holy Cross | L 52–67 | 7–12 (2–6) | Alumni Hall (2,540); Annapolis, MD |
| Jan 29; 7:30 pm | at American | L 52–74 | 7–13 (2–7) | Bender Arena (1,528); Washington, D.C. |
| Feb 1; 2:00 pm | at Lafayette | L 54–72 | 7–14 (2–8) | Kirby Sports Center (2,142); Easton, PA |
| Feb 5; 7:00 pm | Boston University | L 48–61 | 7–15 (2–9) | Alumni Hall (1,763); Annapolis, MD |
| Feb 8; 4:00 pm, CBSSN | at Army | W 79–57 | 8–15 (3–9) | Christl Arena (5,195); West Point, NY |
| Feb 12; 7:00 pm | at Bucknell | L 57–78 | 8–16 (3–10) | Sojka Pavilion (2,417); Lewisburg, PA |
| Feb 15; 7:00 pm | Colgate | W 71–61 | 9–16 (4–10) | Alumni Hall (2,553); Annapolis, MD |
| Feb 19; 7:00 pm | at Lehigh | L 65–72 | 9–17 (4–11) | Stabler Arena (956); Bethlehem, PA |
| Feb 23; 12:00 pm | at Holy Cross | L 57–74 | 9–18 (4–12) | Hart Center (1,784); Worcester, MA |
| Feb 26; 7:00 pm | American | L 55–64 | 9–19 (4–13) | Alumni Hall (1,321); Annapolis, MD |
| Mar 1; 2:00 pm | Loyola (MD) | L 65–67 | 9–20 (4–14) | Alumni Hall (4,029); Annapolis, MD |
2014 Patriot League tournament
| Mar 3; 7:00 pm | at Colgate; First Round | L 51–57 | 9–21 | Cotterell Court (1,345); Hamilton, NY |
*Non-conference game. ^{#}Rankings from AP Poll. (#) Tournament seedings in parentheses. All times are in Eastern Time.
