= 2013–14 Loyola Greyhounds men's basketball team =

American college basketball season

2013–14 Loyola Greyhounds men's basketball
- Conference: Patriot League
- Record: 11–19 (6–12 Patriot)
- Head coach: G.G. Smith (1st season)
- Assistant coaches: Keith Booth; Josh Loeffler; Dan Ficke
- Home arena: Reitz Arena

2013–14 Patriot League men's basketball standings
	Conf.				Overall
Team	W		L	PCT	W		L	PCT
Boston University	15	–	3	.833	24	–	11	.686
American †	13	–	5	.722	20	–	13	.606
Holy Cross	12	–	6	.667	20	–	14	.588
Bucknell	11	–	7	.611	16	–	14	.533
Army	10	–	8	.556	15	–	16	.484
Lehigh	7	–	11	.389	14	–	18	.438
Colgate	6	–	12	.333	13	–	18	.419
Loyola (MD)	6	–	12	.333	11	–	19	.367
Lafayette	6	–	12	.333	11	–	20	.355
Navy	4	–	14	.222	9	–	21	.300
† 2014 Patriot League tournament winner

The 2013–14 Loyola Greyhounds men's basketball team represented Loyola University Maryland during the 2013–14 NCAA Division I men's basketball season. The Greyhounds, led by first year head coach G.G. Smith, played their home games at Reitz Arena and were first year members of the Patriot League. They finished the season 11–19, 6–12 in Patriot League play to finish in a three way tie for seventh place. They lost in the first round of the Patriot League tournament to Lafayette.

== Roster ==
Number	Name	Position	Height	Weight	Year	Hometown
0	Jevon Patton	Forward	5–8	161	Freshman	Charlotte, North Carolina
1	Nick Gorski	Forward	6–9	224	Freshman	Richmond, Virginia
2	Damion Rashford	Guard	6–5	221	RS–Freshman	Pickering, Ontario
3	Dylon Cormier	Guard	6–3	184	Senior	Baltimore, Maryland
4	Stefano Mancini	Guard	6–2	175	Junior	Falmouth, Maine
5	Eric Laster	Guard	6–6	195	Sophomore	Smyrna, Delaware
10	Denzel Brito	Guard	6–2	202	RS–Junior	Wareham, Massachusetts
11	Sean Tuohy Jr.	Guard	6–0	179	RS–Freshman	Memphis, Tennessee
12	R.J. Williams	Guard	5–9	155	Junior	Baltimore, Maryland
13	Franz Rassman	Forward	6–9	224	Sophomore	Takoma Park, Maryland
15	Jordan Letham	Forward	6–9	243	Senior	Baltimore, Maryland
21	Jarred Jones	Guard	6–7	192	Sophomore	Havre de Grace, Maryland
23	Tyler Hubbard	Guard	6–2	180	Sophomore	Washington, D.C.
34	Chido Onyiuke	Forward	6–7	204	Senior	Mount Arlington, New Jersey
42	Josh Forney	Forward	6–9	261	RS–Freshman	Baltimore, Maryland

== Schedule ==
Date time, TV	Opponent	Result	Record	Site (attendance) city, state
Exhibition
Oct 31*; 7:30 pm	Shippensburg	W 92–59		Reitz Arena (N/A); Baltimore, MD
Regular season
Nov 8*; 8:00 pm	at Binghamton	W 79–74	1–0	Binghamton University Events Center (4,318); Vestal, NY
Nov 10*; 4:00 pm	at Cornell	W 93–89	2–0	Newman Arena (1,444); Ithaca, NY
Nov 16*; 8:00 pm, MASN	Fairfield	W 59–52	3–0	Reitz Arena (2,007); Baltimore, MD
Nov 20*; 7:30 pm, MASN	at UMBC	W 89–83 ^{OT}	4–0	Retriever Activities Center (1,741); Baltimore, MD
Nov 26*; 7:00 pm, SNY	at No. 13 UConn	L 66–76	4–1	XL Center (9,497); Hartford, CT
Dec 2*; 7:00 pm, RTPT	at West Virginia	L 47–96	4–2	WVU Coliseum (4,692); Morgantown, WV
Dec 4*; 7:30 pm	Catholic	W 87–75	5–2	Reitz Arena (601); Baltimore, MD
Dec 7*; 2:00 pm, MASN	at Mount St. Mary's	L 58–70	5–3	Knott Arena (1,587); Emmitsburg, MD
Dec 19*; 7:30 pm	Stony Brook	L 69–76	5–4	Reitz Arena (573); Baltimore, MD
Dec 21*; 3:00 pm	Saint Joseph's	L 77–88	5–5	Reitz Arena (1,032); Baltimore, MD
Dec 30*; 7:00 pm, ESPN3	at Miami (FL)	L 48–71	5–6	BankUnited Center (5,166); Coral Gables, FL
Jan 2; 7:30 pm	Navy	W 63–57 ^{OT}	6–6 (1–0)	Reitz Arena (536); Baltimore, MD
Jan 5; 2:00 pm	at Army	L 82–91	6–7 (1–1)	Christl Arena (1,076); West Point, NY
Jan 8; 7:30 pm	at American	L 51–65	6–8 (1–2)	Bender Arena (703); Washington, D.C.
Jan 11; 4:00 pm	Lehigh	W 72–68	7–8 (2–2)	Reitz Arena (984); Baltimore, MD
Jan 13; 7:30 pm, CBSSN	Lafayette	W 77–63	8–8 (3–2)	Reitz Arena (1,378); Baltimore, MD
Jan 20; 7:30 pm, CBSSN	at Boston University	L 58–72	8–9 (3–3)	Agganis Arena (1,411); Boston, MA
Jan 22; 7:00 pm	at Bucknell	L 60–70	8–10 (3–4)	Stabler Arena (2,528); Bethlehem, PA
Jan 25; 7:00 pm	Colgate	W 67–60	9–10 (4–4)	Reitz Arena (2,540); Baltimore, MD
Jan 29; 7:00 pm	at Holy Cross	L 51–60	9–11 (4–5)	Hart Center (874); Worcester, MA
Feb 1; 1:00 pm	Army	L 71–77	9–12 (4–6)	Reitz Arena (914); Baltimore, MD
Feb 5; 7:30 pm	American	W 62–58	10–12 (5–6)	Reitz Arena (652); Baltimore, MD
Feb 8; 2:00 pm	at Lehigh	L 52–66	10–13 (5–7)	Stabler Arena (1,211); Bethlehem, PA
Feb 12; 7:00 pm	at Lafayette	L 44–61	10–14 (5–8)	Kirby Sports Center (1,244); Easton, PA
Feb 15; 8:00 pm, MASN	Boston University	L 72–87	10–15 (5–9)	Reitz Arena (1,026); Baltimore, MD
Feb 19; 7:30 pm	Bucknell	L 53–55	10–16 (5–10)	Reitz Arena (646); Baltimore, MD
Feb 22; 2:00 pm	at Colgate	L 60–84	10–17 (5–11)	Cotterell Court (947); Hamilton, NY
Feb 26; 7:30 pm	Holy Cross	L 52–65	10–18 (5–12)	Reitz Arena (886); Baltimore, MD
Mar 1; 2:00 pm	at Navy	W 67–65	11–18 (6–12)	Alumni Hall (4,029); Annapolis, MD
2014 Patriot League tournament
Mar 3; 7:30 pm	Lafayette; First round	L 71–84	11–19	Reitz Arena (318); Baltimore, MD
*Non-conference game. ^{#}Rankings from AP Poll. (#) Tournament seedings in parentheses. All times are in Eastern Time.
