= 2013–14 Holy Cross Crusaders men's basketball team =

American college basketball season

2013–14 Holy Cross Crusaders men's basketball

CIT Second round vs. Yale, L 66–71
- Conference: Patriot League
- Record: 20–14 (12–6 Patriot)
- Head coach: Milan Brown (4th season)
- Assistant coaches: Brion Dunlap; Kevin Robinson; Kevin Driscoll
- Home arena: Hart Center

2013–14 Patriot League men's basketball standings
| | Conf. | | | | Overall |
| Team | W | | L | PCT | W | | L | PCT |
|---|---|---|---|---|---|---|---|---|
| Boston University | 15 | – | 3 | .833 | 24 | – | 11 | .686 |
| American † | 13 | – | 5 | .722 | 20 | – | 13 | .606 |
| Holy Cross | 12 | – | 6 | .667 | 20 | – | 14 | .588 |
| Bucknell | 11 | – | 7 | .611 | 16 | – | 14 | .533 |
| Army | 10 | – | 8 | .556 | 15 | – | 16 | .484 |
| Lehigh | 7 | – | 11 | .389 | 14 | – | 18 | .438 |
| Colgate | 6 | – | 12 | .333 | 13 | – | 18 | .419 |
| Loyola (MD) | 6 | – | 12 | .333 | 11 | – | 19 | .367 |
| Lafayette | 6 | – | 12 | .333 | 11 | – | 20 | .355 |
| Navy | 4 | – | 14 | .222 | 9 | – | 21 | .300 |
† 2014 Patriot League tournament winner

The 2013–14 Holy Cross Crusaders men's basketball team represented the College of the Holy Cross during the 2013–14 NCAA Division I men's basketball season. The Crusaders, led by fourth year head coach Milan Brown, played their home games at the Hart Center and were members of the Patriot League. They finished the season 20–14, 12–6 in Patriot League play to finish in third place. They advanced to the semifinals of the Patriot League tournament where they lost to American. They were invited to the CollegeInsiders.com Tournament where they defeated Brown in the first round before losing to Yale in the second round.

== Roster ==
2013–14 Holy Cross Crusaders men's basketball team
Players
Coaches

| Pos. | # | Name | Height | Weight | Year | Previous school | Hometown |
|---|---|---|---|---|---|---|---|
| G | 2 | Anthony Thompson | 5 ft 10 in (1.78 m) | 150 lb (68 kg) | Fr | Bullis | Glenn Dale, Maryland |
| G | 3 | Justin Burrell | 5 ft 9 in (1.75 m) | 165 lb (75 kg) | Jr | Potomac | Dumfries, Virginia |
| G | 4 | Chris Jayne | 5 ft 11 in (1.8 m) | 160 lb (73 kg) | Jr | Newburyport | Newburyport, Massachusetts |
| G | 5 | Cullen Hamilton | 6 ft 2 in (1.88 m) | 185 lb (84 kg) | So | Potomac (VA) | Washington, D.C. |
| F | 12 | Christopher Morgan | 6 ft 7 in (2.01 m) | 215 lb (98 kg) | So | Gloucester | Gloucester, Virginia |
| F | 13 | Malcolm Miller | 6 ft 7 in (2.01 m) | 210 lb (95 kg) | Jr | Gaithersburg | Laytonsville, Maryland |
| G | 15 | De'Vaughn Reid | 6 ft 0 in (1.83 m) | 165 lb (75 kg) | Jr | Rice (NY) | West Orange, New Jersey |
| F | 21 | Malachi Alexander | 6 ft 7 in (2.01 m) | 217 lb (98 kg) | Fr | Eleanor Roosevelt | Bowie, Maryland |
| F | 22 | Robert Champion | 6 ft 6 in (1.98 m) | 204 lb (93 kg) | Fr | Charlotte Christian | Charlotte, North Carolina |
| G/F | 24 | Eric Green | 6 ft 4 in (1.93 m) | 191 lb (87 kg) | So | St. Mark's (MA) | Mountain House, California |
| F | 25 | Isaiah Baker | 6 ft 8 in (2.03 m) | 240 lb (109 kg) | So | Shipley | Wyncote, Pennsylvania |
| F | 30 | Riley Criswell | 6 ft 8 in (2.03 m) | 205 lb (93 kg) | Fr | Carrollton | Carrollton, Georgia |
| F | 40 | Patrick Kerrigan | 6 ft 8 in (2.03 m) | 215 lb (98 kg) | Jr | Warde | Fairfield, Connecticut |
| C | 42 | Matt Husek | 6 ft 11 in (2.11 m) | 240 lb (109 kg) | Fr | Bethlehem Catholic (PA) | Stewartsville, New Jersey |
| F | 43 | Taylor Abt | 6 ft 8 in (2.03 m) | 225 lb (102 kg) | Jr | Georgetown Prep | Darnestown, Maryland |
| F/C | 50 | Dave Dudzinski | 6 ft 9 in (2.06 m) | 227 lb (103 kg) | Sr | Kaneland | Elburn, Illinois |

Head coach

- Milan Brown, 4th yr. (Howard, 1993)

Assistant coach(es)

- Brion Dunlap, 4th yr. (Old Dominion, 1998)
- Kevin Robinson, 4th yr. (Mount St. Mary's, 2000)
- Kevin Driscoll, 1st yr. (Misericordia, 2004)

Legend

- (C) Team captain
- (S) Suspended
- (I) Ineligible
- (W) Walk-on
- Injured
- Current redshirt

Roster
Last update: November 26, 2013

== Schedule ==
| Date time, TV | Opponent | Result | Record | Site (attendance) city, state |
Exhibition
| Nov 2*; 4:00 pm | Assumption | W 88–68 | | Hart Center (752); Worcester, MA |
Regular season
| Nov 10*; 5:30 pm, NESN | vs. Harvard; Coaches vs. Cancer Tripleheader | L 78–82 | 0–1 | TD Garden (6,037); Boston, MA |
| Nov 13*; 7:00 pm | Sacred Heart | W 122–118 ^{2OT} | 1–1 | Hart Center (991); Worcester, MA |
| Nov 15*; 8:00 pm, ESPNU | at No. 12 North Carolina; Hall of Fame Tip Off | L 54–62 | 1–2 | Dean Smith Center (15,833); Chapel Hill, NC |
| Nov 20*; 7:00 pm | at Fairfield; Hall of Fame Tip Off | W 63–49 | 2–2 | Webster Bank Arena (1,052); Bridgeport, CT |
| Nov 23*; 7:30 pm | vs. Belmont; Hall of Fame Tip Off | L 70–81 | 2–3 | Mohegan Sun Arena (2,073); Uncasville, CT |
| Nov 24*; 6:00 pm | vs. Hartford; Hall of Fame Tip Off | W 80–55 | 3–3 | Mohegan Sun Arena (1,506); Uncasville, CT |
| Nov 30*; 1:00 pm, WBIN | at New Hampshire | W 63–52 | 4–3 | Lundholm Gym (308); Durham, NH |
| Dec 4*; 7:00 pm | Albany | W 62–57 | 5–3 | Hart Center (1,374); Worcester, MA |
| Dec 7*; 7:00 pm | at Hartford | L 78–90 | 5–4 | Chase Arena (1,590); Hartford, CT |
| Dec 16*; 7:00 pm | Canisius | L 73–83 | 5–5 | Hart Center (1,066); Worcester, MA |
| Dec 21*; 2:00 pm | at NJIT | W 74–55 | 6–5 | Fleisher Center (850); Newark, NJ |
| Dec 28*; 6:30 pm, BTN | at Michigan | L 66–88 | 6–6 | Crisler Center (12,707); Ann Arbor, MI |
| Jan 2; 7:00 pm | at Boston University | L 60–70 | 6–7 (0–1) | Agganis Arena (153); Boston, MA |
| Jan 5; 1:00 pm | American | L 54–69 | 6–8 (0–2) | Hart Center (1,138); Worcester, MA |
| Jan 5; 7:00 pm, Charter TV3 | Colgate | W 73–64 | 7–8 (1–2) | Hart Center (812); Worcester, MA |
| Jan 11; 2:00 pm, CBSSN | at Bucknell | L 57–61 | 7–9 (1–3) | Sojka Pavilion (3,006); Lewisburg, PA |
| Jan 15; 7:00 pm | at Army | W 78–75 | 8–9 (2–3) | Christl Arena (783); West Point, NY |
| Jan 18; 4:00 pm | Lehigh | W 61–42 | 9–9 (3–3) | Hart Center (1,487); Worcester, MA |
| Jan 22; 7:00 pm | at Lafayette | W 59–58 | 10–9 (4–3) | Kirby Sports Center (1,789); Easton, PA |
| Jan 25; 7:00 pm | at Navy | W 67–52 | 11–9 (5–3) | Alumni Hall (2,540); Annapolis, MD |
| Jan 29; 7:00 pm, Charter TV3 | Loyola (MD) | W 60–51 | 12–9 (6–3) | Hart Center (874); Worcester, MA |
| Feb 1; 1:00 pm | at American | L 57–63 | 12–10 (6–4) | Bender Arena (2,538); Washington, D.C. |
| Feb 4; 2:00 pm, CBSSN | at Colgate | W 69–68 | 13–10 (7–4) | Cotterell Court (702); Hamilton, NY |
| Feb 9; 12:00 pm, CBSSN | Bucknell | W 66–50 | 14–10 (8–4) | Hart Center (2,593); Worcester, MA |
| Feb 12; 7:00 pm | Army | W 66–63 | 15–10 (9–4) | Hart Center (1,547); Worcester, MA |
| Feb 15; 2:00 pm, Service Electric | at Lehigh | W 72–67 | 16–10 (10–4) | Stabler Arena (1,150); Bethlehem, PA |
| Feb 19; 7:00 pm | Lafayette | L 64–76 | 16–11 (10–5) | Hart Center (1,043); Worcester, MA |
| Feb 23; 12:00 pm | Navy | W 74–57 | 17–11 (11–5) | Hart Center (1,784); Worcester, MA |
| Feb 26; 7:30 pm | at Loyola (MD) | W 65–52 | 18–11 (12–5) | Reitz Arena (886); Baltimore, MD |
| Mar 1; 2:00 pm | Boston University | L 64–68 | 18–12 (12–6) | Hart Center (2,711); Worcester, MA |
Patriot League tournament
| Mar 5; 7:00 pm | Lehigh; Quarterfinals | W 54–48 | 19–12 | Hart Center (1,027); Worcester, MA |
| Mar 8; 5:30 pm, CBSSN | at American; Semifinals | L 46–57 | 19–13 | Bender Arena (1,403); Washington, D.C. |
CIT
| Mar 17*; 7:00 pm | at Brown; First round | W 68–65 | 20–13 | Pizzitola Sports Center (924); Providence, RI |
| Mar 22*; 7:00 pm | Yale; Second round | L 66–71 | 20–14 | Hart Center (1,236); Worcester, MA |
*Non-conference game. ^{#}Rankings from AP Poll. (#) Tournament seedings in parentheses. All times are in Eastern Time.
