= 2013–14 Bucknell Bison men's basketball team =

American college basketball season

2013–14 Bucknell Bison men's basketball
- Conference: Patriot League
- Record: 16–14 (11–7 Patriot)
- Head coach: Dave Paulsen (6th season)
- Assistant coaches: Dane Fischer; Aaron Kelly; Charles Lee
- Home arena: Sojka Pavilion

2013–14 Patriot League men's basketball standings
	Conf.				Overall
Team	W		L	PCT	W		L	PCT
Boston University	15	–	3	.833	24	–	11	.686
American †	13	–	5	.722	20	–	13	.606
Holy Cross	12	–	6	.667	20	–	14	.588
Bucknell	11	–	7	.611	16	–	14	.533
Army	10	–	8	.556	15	–	16	.484
Lehigh	7	–	11	.389	14	–	18	.438
Colgate	6	–	12	.333	13	–	18	.419
Loyola (MD)	6	–	12	.333	11	–	19	.367
Lafayette	6	–	12	.333	11	–	20	.355
Navy	4	–	14	.222	9	–	21	.300
† 2014 Patriot League tournament winner

The 2013–14 Bucknell Bison men's basketball team represented Bucknell University during the 2013–14 NCAA Division I men's basketball season. The Bison, led by sixth year head coach Dave Paulsen, played their home games at Sojka Pavilion and were members of the Patriot League. They finished the season 16–14, 11–7 in Patriot League play to finish in fourth place. They lost in the quarterfinals of the Patriot League tournament to Army.

== Roster ==
Number	Name	Position	Height	Weight	Year	Hometown
0	D.J. MacLeay	Forward	6–7	207	Freshman	San Antonio, Texas
1	Joshea Singleton	Guard	6–3	205	Junior	Kinston, North Carolina
3	Steven Kasper	Guard	6–2	192	Junior	Lakeland, Tennessee
5	John Azzinaro	Guard	5–11	169	Freshman	San Antonio, Texas
10	Brian Fitzpatrick	Forward	6–8	235	Senior	Cheshire, Connecticut
11	Ryan Hill	Guard	6–3	199	Senior	Steelton, Pennsylvania
14	Chris Hass	Guard	6–5	182	Sophomore	Pellston, Michigan
22	Cory Starkey	Forward	6–8	216	Junior	Petoskey, Michigan
25	Matt Banas	Forward	6–9	205	Sophomore	Hershey, Pennsylvania
32	Ryan Frazier	Guard	6–0	186	Sophomore	Silver Spring, Maryland
33	Ben Brackney	Guard	6–6	206	Senior	Lincoln, Illinois
42	Cameron Ayers	Guard	6–5	203	Senior	Blue Bell, Pennsylvania
44	Ben Oberfeld	Center	6–9	240	Freshman	Eagan, Minnesota
50	Don Hoffman	Forward	6–7	214	Sophomore	Hawthorne, New Jersey

== Schedule ==
Date time, TV	Opponent	Result	Record	Site (attendance) city, state
Regular season
Nov 8*; 10:00 pm, P12N	at Stanford	L 68–72	0–1	Maples Pavilion (7,233); Stanford, CA
Nov 13*; 7:00 pm	at Penn State	W 90–80	1–1	Bryce Jordan Center (4,670); University Park, PA
Nov 16*; 7:00 pm	Saint Francis (PA)	W 72–50	2–1	Sojka Pavilion (3,262); Lewisburg, PA
Nov 19*; 8:30 pm, FS1	at St. John's	L 63–67	2–2	Carnesecca Arena (3,963); Queens, NY
Nov 23*; 7:00 pm	at Albany	W 77–64	3–2	SEFCU Arena (3,756); Albany, NY
Nov 26*; 7:00 pm	at Mount St. Mary's	L 64–69	3–3	Knott Arena (1,010); Emmitsburg, MD
Nov 30*; 7:00 pm	Princeton	L 53–66	3–4	Sojka Pavilion (3,011); Lewisburg, PA
Dec 4*; 7:00 pm	at Kent State	W 66–59	4–4	The MAC (2,657); Kent, OH
Dec 7*; 7:00 pm	Columbia	W 57–52	5–4	Sojka Pavilion (2,867); Lewisburg, PA
Dec 20*; 7:00 pm	at Marist	L 51–69	5–5	McCann Field House (1,119); Poughkeepsie, NY
Dec 28*; 2:00 pm	Fairfield	L 63–74	5–6	Sojka Pavilion (3,016); Lewisburg, PA
Jan 2; 7:00 pm	American	L 57–67	5–7 (0–1)	Sojka Pavilion (2,367); Lewisburg, PA
Jan 5; 2:00 pm	Colgate	W 68–57	6–7 (1–1)	Sojka Pavilion (3,045); Lewisburg, PA
Jan 8; 7:00 pm	at Lafayette	W 96–86	7–7 (2–1)	Kirby Sports Center (2,314); Easton, PA
Jan 11; 2:00 pm	Holy Cross	W 61–57	8–7 (3–1)	Sojka Pavilion (3,006); Lewisburg, PA
Jan 15; 7:00 pm	at Navy	L 61–62	8–8 (3–2)	Alumni Hall (1,079); Annapolis, MD
Jan 19; 3:00 pm, CBSSN	at Army	L 67–74	8–9 (3–3)	Christl Arena (1,350); West Point, NY
Jan 22; 7:00 pm	Loyola (MD)	W 70–60	9–9 (4–3)	Sojka Pavilion (2,528); Lewisburg, PA
Jan 25; 2:00 pm, CBSSN	Boston University	L 61–64	9–10 (4–4)	Sojka Pavilion (3,790); Lewisburg, PA
Jan 29; 7:00 pm	at Lehigh	L 63–66	9–11 (4–5)	Stabler Arena (1,367); Bethlehem, PA
Feb 1; 2:00 pm	at Colgate	W 79–68	10–11 (5–5)	Cotterell Court (713); Hamilton, NY
Feb 5; 7:00 pm	Lafayette	L 58–66	10–12 (5–6)	Sojka Pavilion (2,419); Lewisburg, PA
Feb 9; 12:00 pm, CBSSN	at Holy Cross	L 50–66	10–13 (5–7)	Hart Center (2,593); Worcester, MA
Feb 12; 7:00 pm	Navy	W 78–57	11–13 (6–7)	Sojka Pavilion (2,417); Lewisburg, PA
Feb 15; 7:00 pm	Army	W 73–61	12–13 (7–7)	Sojka Pavilion (3,363); Lewisburg, PA
Feb 19; 7:30 pm	at Loyola (MD)	W 55–53	13–13 (8–7)	Reitz Arena (646); Baltimore, MD
Feb 23; 12:00 pm	at Boston University	W 63–53	14–13 (9–7)	Agganis Arena (1,343); Boston, MA
Feb 26; 7:00 pm	Lehigh	W 65–61	15–13 (10–7)	Sojka Pavilion (2,775); Lewisburg, PA
Mar 1; 2:00 pm, CBSSN	at American	W 56–51	16–13 (11–7)	Bender Arena (2,879); Washington, D.C.
Patriot League tournament
Mar 5; 7:00 pm	Army; Quarterfinals	L 71–72	16–14	Sojka Pavilion (1,704); Lewisburg, PA
*Non-conference game. ^{#}Rankings from AP Poll. (#) Tournament seedings in parentheses. All times are in Eastern Time.
