= 2013–14 Lehigh Mountain Hawks men's basketball team =

American college basketball season

2013–14 Lehigh Mountain Hawks men's basketball
- Conference: Patriot League
- Record: 14–18 (7–11 Patriot)
- Head coach: Brett Reed (7th season)
- Assistant coaches: Antoni Wyche; Ryan Krueger; Kyle Griffin
- Home arena: Stabler Arena

2013–14 Patriot League men's basketball standings
	Conf.				Overall
Team	W		L	PCT	W		L	PCT
Boston University	15	–	3	.833	24	–	11	.686
American †	13	–	5	.722	20	–	13	.606
Holy Cross	12	–	6	.667	20	–	14	.588
Bucknell	11	–	7	.611	16	–	14	.533
Army	10	–	8	.556	15	–	16	.484
Lehigh	7	–	11	.389	14	–	18	.438
Colgate	6	–	12	.333	13	–	18	.419
Loyola (MD)	6	–	12	.333	11	–	19	.367
Lafayette	6	–	12	.333	11	–	20	.355
Navy	4	–	14	.222	9	–	21	.300
† 2014 Patriot League tournament winner

The 2013–14 Lehigh Mountain Hawks men's basketball team represented Lehigh University during the 2013–14 NCAA Division I men's basketball season. The Mountain Hawks, led by seventh year head coach Brett Reed, played their home games at Stabler Arena and were members of the Patriot League. They finished the season 14–18, 7–11 in Patriot League play to finish in sixth place. They lost in the quarterfinals of the Patriot League tournament to Holy Cross.

== Roster ==
Number	Name	Position	Height	Year	Hometown
1	Anthony D'Orazio	Guard	6–2	Senior	Camden, New Jersey
4	Devon Carter	Guard	6–4	Sophomore	Cleveland, Ohio
5	Austin Price	Guard	6–3	Freshman	Farmington Hills, Michigan
10	Miles Simelton	Guard	6–0	Freshman	Oswego, Illinois
11	Mackey McKnight	Guard	6–0	Senior	New Orleans, Louisiana
13	Cole Renninger	Guard	6–3	Freshman	Lock Haven, Pennsylvania
15	Corey Schaefer	Guard	6–1	Junior	Johnston, Iowa
20	John Ross Glover	Guard/Forward	6–4	Sophomore	Jackson, Tennessee
21	Stefan Cvrkalj	Guard	6–4	Junior	Kitchener, Ontario
23	Shane Whitfield	Forward	6–7	Freshman	Raleigh, North Carolina
31	Jesse Chuku	Forward	6–8	Sophomore	London, England
32	Tim Kempton Jr.	Center/Forward	6–10	Freshman	Scottsdale, Arizona
40	Justin Goldsborough	Forward	6–8	Sophomore	Fort Washington, Maryland
42	Georgios Pilitsis	Guard	6–2	Freshman	Thessaloniki, Greece
44	Conroy Baltimore	Forward	6–6	Junior	The Bronx, New York

== Schedule ==
Date time, TV	Opponent	Result	Record	Site (attendance) city, state
Non-conference regular season
Nov 8*; 8:00 pm	at Minnesota	L 62–81	0–1	Williams Arena (12,957); Minneapolis, MN
Nov 12*; 7:00 pm	Rider	W 92–78	1–1	Stabler Arena (1,042); Bethlehem, PA
Nov 15*; 7:00 pm	at Fordham	L 72–80	1–2	Rose Hill Gymnasium (2,128); Bronx, NY
Nov 17*; 2:00 pm	at Houston; Legends Classic	L 66–80	1–3	Hofheinz Pavilion (2,635); Houston, TX
Nov 20*; 7:30 pm	at Pittsburgh; Legends Classic	L 58–77	1–4	Petersen Events Center (9,544); Pittsburgh, PA
Nov 25*; 6:30 pm	vs. Texas Southern; Legends Classic	W 67–63	2–4	Frost Arena (254); Brookings, SD
Nov 26*; 9:00 pm	at South Dakota State; Legends Classic	L 61–74	2–5	Frost Arena (1,696); Brookings, SD
Dec 1*; 2:00 pm	Sacred Heart	W 76–64	3–5	Stabler Arena (941); Bethlehem, PA
Dec 4*; 7:00 pm	at Saint Francis (PA)	W 57–50	4–5	DeGol Arena (904); Loretto, PA
Dec 7*; 2:00 pm	UMBC	W 70–68	5–5	Stabler Arena (817); Bethlehem, PA
Dec 9*; 7:30 pm	LIU Brooklyn	W 76–69	6–5	Stabler Arena (737); Bethlehem, PA
Dec 21*; 7:00 pm	Quinnipiac	W 69–58	7–5	Stabler Arena (1,126); Bethlehem, PA
Dec 30*; 7:00 pm	at Bryant	L 68–70	7–6	Chace Athletic Center (1,143); Smithfield, RI
Patriot League regular season
Jan 2; 7:00 pm	at Colgate	W 88–81 ^{2OT}	8–6 (1–0)	Cotterell Court (486); Hamilton, New York
Jan 5; 1:00 pm, CBSSN	Boston University	L 66–67	8–7 (1–1)	Stabler Arena (1,015); Bethlehem, PA
Jan 8; 7:00 pm	Army	L 76–79	8–8 (1–2)	Stabler Arena (915); Bethlehem, PA
Jan 11; 4:00 pm	at Loyola (MD)	L 68–73	8–9 (1–3)	Reitz Arena (984); Baltimore, MD
Jan 15; 7:00 pm	American	L 63–65	8–10 (1–4)	Stabler Arena (979); Bethlehem, PA
Jan 18; 2:00 pm	at Holy Cross	L 42–61	8–11 (1–5)	Hart Center (1,487); Worcester, MA
Jan 22; 7:00 pm	at Navy	W 68–66 ^{OT}	9–11 (2–5)	Alumni Hall (605); Annapolis, MD
Jan 25; 7:00 pm	Lafayette	W 71–68	10–11 (3–5)	Stabler Arena (1,983); Bethlehem, PA
Jan 29; 7:00 pm	Bucknell	W 66–63	11–11 (4–5)	Stabler Arena (1,367); Bethlehem, PA
Feb 1; 1:00 pm	at Boston University	W 82–80 ^{OT}	12–11 (5–5)	Case Gym (968); Boston, MA
Feb 5; 7:00 pm	at Army	L 51–70	12–12 (5–6)	Christl Arena (931); West Point, NY
Feb 8; 2:00 pm	Loyola (MD)	W 66–52	13–12 (6–6)	Stabler Arena (1,211); Bethlehem, PA
Feb 12; 7:00 pm	at American	L 44–64	13–13 (6–7)	Bender Arena (703); Washington, D.C.
Feb 15; 2:00 pm	Holy Cross	L 67–72	13–14 (6–8)	Stabler Arena (1,150); Bethlehem, PA
Feb 19; 7:00 pm	Navy	W 72–65	14–14 (7–8)	Stabler Arena (956); Bethlehem, PA
Feb 23; 12:00 pm	at Lafayette	L 71–77	14–15 (7–9)	Kirby Sports Center (2,648); Easton, PA
Feb 26; 7:00 pm	at Bucknell	L 61–65	14–16 (7–10)	Sojka Pavilion (2,775); Lewisburg, PA
Mar 1; 2:00 pm	Colgate	L 57–74	14–17 (7–11)	Stabler Arena (1,435); Bethlehem, PA
2014 Patriot League tournament
Mar 5; 7:00 pm	at Holy Cross; Quarterfinals	L 48–54	14–18	Hart Center (1,027); Worcester, MA
*Non-conference game. ^{#}Rankings from AP Poll. (#) Tournament seedings in parentheses. All times are in Eastern Time.
