= 2013–14 Colgate Raiders men's basketball team =

American college basketball season

2013–14 Colgate Raiders men's basketball
- Conference: Patriot League
- Record: 13–18 (6–12 Patriot)
- Head coach: Matt Langel (3rd season)
- Assistant coaches: Dave Klatsky; Michael McGarvey; Michael-Hakim Jordan
- Home arena: Cotterell Court

2013–14 Patriot League men's basketball standings
	Conf.				Overall
Team	W		L	PCT	W		L	PCT
Boston University	15	–	3	.833	24	–	11	.686
American †	13	–	5	.722	20	–	13	.606
Holy Cross	12	–	6	.667	20	–	14	.588
Bucknell	11	–	7	.611	16	–	14	.533
Army	10	–	8	.556	15	–	16	.484
Lehigh	7	–	11	.389	14	–	18	.438
Colgate	6	–	12	.333	13	–	18	.419
Loyola (MD)	6	–	12	.333	11	–	19	.367
Lafayette	6	–	12	.333	11	–	20	.355
Navy	4	–	14	.222	9	–	21	.300
† 2014 Patriot League tournament winner

The 2013–14 Colgate Raiders men's basketball team represented Colgate University during the 2013–14 NCAA Division I men's basketball season. The Raiders, led by third year head coach Matt Langel, played their home games at Cotterell Court and were members of the Patriot League. They finished the season 13–18, 6–12 in Patriot League play to finish in a three way tie for seventh place. They advanced to the quarterfinals of the Patriot League tournament where they lost to American.

== Roster ==
Number	Name	Position	Height	Weight	Year	Hometown
0	Anthony DeRiggs	Guard	5–8	160	Junior	Brooklyn, New York
1	Austin Tillotson	Guard	6–0	175	RS–Sophomore	York, Pennsylvania
2	Nathan Harries	Guard	6–2	180	Freshman	Alpharetta, Georgia
3	Wyatt Hagerty	Center	6–11	256	Freshman	Bethel Park, Pennsylvania
4	Luke Roh	Guard	6–4	195	Junior	Scottsdale, Arizona
5	Pat Moore	Guard	6–5	200	Senior	Whitesboro, New York
12	Alex Ramon	Guard	6–1	196	Sophomore	Vitoria-Gasteiz, Spain
13	Murphy Burnatowski	Forward	6–7	230	Senior	Waterloo, Ontario, Canada
14	Chad Johnson	Guard	6–3	209	Senior	Atlanta, Georgia
21	Jack Fleming	Forward	6–6	205	Freshman	Tampa, Florida
22	Matt McMullen	Forward	6–6	220	Junior	Brick, New Jersey
23	Clayton Graham	Forward	6–8	230	Senior	Old Greenwich, Connecticut
25	Damon Sherman-Newsome	Guard	6–5	205	Junior	Anchorage, Alaska
32	Andrew Bargmann	Guard	6–3	180	Freshman	Downingtown, Pennsylvania
33	Nic Lane	Guard	6–0	175	Junior	Seattle, Washington
34	John Fenton	Center	6–9	240	Freshman	Modesto, California
35	Ethan Jacobs	Center	6–11	235	RS–Junior	Tipton, Indiana

== Schedule ==
Date time, TV	Opponent	Result	Record	Site (attendance) city, state
Regular season
Nov 8*; 7:00 pm, ESPN3	at Wake Forest	L 78–89	0–1	LJVM Coliseum (7,402); Winston-Salem, NC
Nov 16*; 4:30 pm	at No. 9 Syracuse	L 50–69	0–2	Carrier Dome (25,519); Syracuse, NY
Nov 20*; 7:00 pm	Cornell	W 81–58	1–2	Cotterell Court (740); Hamilton, NY
Nov 23*; 2:00 pm	Saint Francis (PA)	W 81–64	2–2	Cotterell Court (523); Hamilton, NY
Nov 26*; 7:00 pm	at Tulane	W 98–86	3–2	Devlin Fieldhouse (1,502); New Orleans, LA
Dec 1*; 2:00 pm	at Binghamton	W 93–64	4–2	Binghamton University Events Center (1,789); Vestal, NY
Dec 7*; 12:00 pm, FS1	at Georgetown	L 55–61	4–3	Verizon Center (7,966); Washington, D.C.
Dec 10*; 7:00 pm	Fordham	L 73–77	4–4	Cotterell Court (630); Hamilton, NY
Dec 14*; 7:00 pm	at Albany	W 69–60	5–4	SEFCU Arena (1,821); Albany, NY
Dec 22*; 1:00 pm	Ursinus	W 79–51	6–4	Cotterell Court (613); Hamilton, NY
Dec 30*; 7:00 pm	Columbia	L 70–76 ^{2OT}	6–5	Cotterell Court (734); Hamilton, NY
Jan 2; 7:00 pm	Lehigh	L 81–88 ^{2OT}	6–6 (0–1)	Cotterell Court (486); Hamilton, NY
Jan 5; 2:00 pm	at Bucknell	L 57–68	6–7 (0–2)	Sojka Pavilion (3,045); Lewisburg, PA
Jan 8; 7:00 pm	at Holy Cross	L 64–73	6–8 (0–3)	Hart Center (812); Worcester, MA
Jan 11; 2:00 pm	American	L 62–69	6–9 (0–4)	Cotterell Court (509); Hamilton, NY
Jan 15; 7:00 pm	at Boston University	L 58–66	6–10 (0–5)	Agganis Arena (705); Boston, MA
Jan 18; 2:00 pm	Navy	W 63–41	7–10 (1–5)	Cotterell Court (598); Hamilton, NY
Jan 22; 7:00 pm	Army	L 63–66	7–11 (1–6)	Cotterell Court (623); Hamilton, NY
Jan 25; 1:00 pm	at Loyola (MD)	L 60–67	7–12 (1–7)	Reitz Arena (2,540); Baltimore, MD
Jan 27; 9:00 pm, CBSSN	at Lafayette	W 75–68	8–12 (2–7)	Kirby Sports Center (1,825); Easton, PA
Feb 1; 2:00 pm	Bucknell	L 68–79	8–13 (2–8)	Cotterell Court (713); Hamilton, NY
Feb 4; 9:00 pm, CBSSN	Holy Cross	L 68–69	8–14 (2–9)	Cotterell Court (702); Hamilton, NY
Feb 8; 2:00 pm	at American	W 63–60	9–14 (3–9)	Bender Arena (2,321); Washington, D.C.
Feb 12; 7:00 pm	Boston University	L 74–76	9–15 (3–10)	Cotterell Court (594); Hamilton, NY
Feb 15; 7:00 pm	at Navy	L 61–71	9–16 (3–11)	Alumni Hall (2,553); Annapolis, MD
Feb 19; 7:00 pm	at Army	L 66–74	9–17 (3–12)	Christl Arena (1,282); West Point, NY
Feb 22; 2:00 pm	Loyola (MD)	W 84–60	10–17 (4–12)	Cotterell Court (947); Hamilton, NY
Feb 26; 7:00 pm	Lafayette	W 83–66	11–17 (5–12)	Cotterell Court (692); Hamilton, NY
Mar 1; 2:00 pm	at Lehigh	W 74–57	12–17 (6–12)	Stabler Arena (1,435); Bethlehem, PA
2014 Patriot League tournament
Mar 3; 7:00 pm	Navy; First round	W 57–51	13–17	Cotterell Court (1,345); Hamilton, NY
Mar 5; 7:30 pm	at American; Quarterfinals	L 50–59	13–18	Bender Arena (913); Washington, D.C.
*Non-conference game. ^{#}Rankings from AP Poll. (#) Tournament seedings in parentheses. All times are in Eastern Time.
