= 2013–14 Boston University Terriers men's basketball team =

American college basketball season

2013–14 Boston University Terriers men's basketball

Patriot League Regular Season Champions

NIT First round vs. Illinois, L 62–66
- Conference: Patriot League
- Record: 24–11 (15–3 Patriot)
- Head coach: Joe Jones (3rd season)
- Assistant coaches: Curtis Wilson; Carmen Maciariello; Shaun Morris
- Home arena: Agganis Arena; Case Gym

2013–14 Patriot League men's basketball standings
	Conf.				Overall
Team	W		L	PCT	W		L	PCT
Boston University	15	–	3	.833	24	–	11	.686
American †	13	–	5	.722	20	–	13	.606
Holy Cross	12	–	6	.667	20	–	14	.588
Bucknell	11	–	7	.611	16	–	14	.533
Army	10	–	8	.556	15	–	16	.484
Lehigh	7	–	11	.389	14	–	18	.438
Colgate	6	–	12	.333	13	–	18	.419
Loyola (MD)	6	–	12	.333	11	–	19	.367
Lafayette	6	–	12	.333	11	–	20	.355
Navy	4	–	14	.222	9	–	21	.300
† 2014 Patriot League tournament winner

The 2013–14 Boston University Terriers men's basketball team represented Boston University during the 2013–14 NCAA Division I men's basketball season. The Terriers, led by third year head coach Joe Jones, played their home games at Agganis Arena, with early season games at Case Gym, and were first year members of the Patriot League. They finished the season 24–11, 15–3 in Patriot League play to win the Patriot League regular season championship. They advanced to the championship game of the Patriot League tournament where they lost to American. As a regular season league champion who failed to win their league tournament, they received an automatic bid to the National Invitation Tournament where they lost in the first round to Illinois.

== Roster ==
2013–14 Boston University Terriers men's basketball team
Players
Coaches

Pos.	#	Name	Height	Weight	Year	Hometown
G	1	Maurice Watson	5 ft 10 in (1.78 m)	165 lb (75 kg)	So	Philadelphia, Pennsylvania
G	2	John Papale	6 ft 3 in (1.91 m)	190 lb (86 kg)	So	Wallingford, Connecticut
G	3	Eric Fanning (I)	6 ft 5 in (1.96 m)	190 lb (86 kg)	So	Trenton, New Jersey
G	5	Blaise Mbargorba (I)	6 ft 11 in (2.11 m)	210 lb (95 kg)	So	Hightstown, New Jersey
G	13	D.J. Irving (C)	6 ft 0 in (1.83 m)	175 lb (79 kg)	Sr	Chester, Pennsylvania
F	14	Braiten Madrigal (W)	6 ft 4 in (1.93 m)	180 lb (82 kg)	Fr	Downey, California
F	15	Dom Morris (C)	6 ft 7 in (2.01 m)	240 lb (109 kg)	Sr	Newark, Delaware
G	20	Cameron Curry (W)	5 ft 9 in (1.75 m)	170 lb (77 kg)	Fr	West Covina, California
G	21	Cedric Hankerson	6 ft 5 in (1.96 m)	190 lb (86 kg)	Fr	Miami, Florida
F	22	Nathan Dieudonne	6 ft 7 in (2.01 m)	210 lb (95 kg)	So	Louisville, Kentucky
F	23	James Kennedy	6 ft 6 in (1.98 m)	225 lb (102 kg)	Jr	Boston, Massachusetts
F	24	Travis Robinson (C)	6 ft 5 in (1.96 m)	190 lb (86 kg)	Sr	Philadelphia, Pennsylvania
G	25	Dylan Brossman (W)	5 ft 9 in (1.75 m)	160 lb (73 kg)	Jr	Reamstown, Pennsylvania
G/F	31	Malik Thomas	6 ft 7 in (2.01 m)	190 lb (86 kg)	Jr	Harlem, New York
F	32	Justin Alston	6 ft 8 in (2.03 m)	220 lb (100 kg)	So	Washington, D.C.
F	41	Dylan Haines	7 ft 0 in (2.13 m)	230 lb (104 kg)	Fr	Liverpool, New York

Head coach

- Joe Jones (SUNY–Oswego)

Assistant coach(es)

- Curtis Wilson (Adelphi)
- Carmen Maciariello (Siena)
- Shaun Morris (Lycoming)

Legend

- (C) Team captain
- (S) Suspended
- (I) Ineligible
- (W) Walk-on
- Injured
- Current redshirt

Roster

== Schedule ==
Date time, TV	Rank^{#}	Opponent^{#}	Result	Record	Site (attendance) city, state
Regular season
Nov 10*; 12:30 pm, NESN		vs. Northeastern; Coaches vs. Cancer Tripleheader	W 72–69	1–0	TD Garden (6,037); Boston, MA
Nov 13*; 7:00 pm		UMass Lowell	W 91–65	2–0	Case Gym (638); Boston, MA
Nov 17*; 12:00 pm, ESPNU		at No. 19 UConn; 2K Sports Classic	L 60–77	2–1	Gampel Pavilion (9,195); Storrs, CT
Nov 22*; 7:30 pm		vs. Eastern Washington; 2K Sports Classic	L 68-80	2–2	Bren Events Center (2,379); Irvine, CA
Nov 23*; 8:30 pm		at UC Irvine; 2K Sports Classic	W 74–68	3–2	Bren Events Center (2,108); Irvine, CA
Nov 24*; 4:30 pm		vs. Long Island; 2K Sports Classic	W 72–57	4–2	Bren Events Center (1,576); Irvine, CA
Nov 30*; 1:00 pm		Saint Peter's	W 66–65	5–2	Case Gym (371); Boston, MA
Dec 2*; 7:00 pm, NESN		at Quinnipiac	W 69–66	6–2	TD Bank Sports Center (1,003); Hamden, CT
Dec 7*; 1:00 pm		Harvard	L 68–79 ^{OT}	6–3	Case Gym (1,233); Boston, MA
Dec 11*; 7:00 pm, NESN		at George Washington	L 60–70	6–4	Charles E. Smith Athletic Center (2,630); Washington, D.C.
Dec 15*; 1:00 pm		Norfolk State	L 82–86 ^{OT}	6–5	Case Gym (302); Boston, MA
Dec 21*; 1:00 pm, ESPN3		at Maryland	W 83–77	7–5	Comcast Center (10,882); College Park, MD
Dec 29*; 4:00 pm		at Saint Joseph's	L 67–73	7–6	Hagan Arena (4,051); Philadelphia, PA
Jan 2; 7:00 pm		Holy Cross	W 70–60	8–6 (1–0)	Agganis Arena (153); Boston, MA
Jan 5; 1:00 pm, CBSSN		at Lehigh	W 67–66	9–6 (2–0)	Stabler Arena (1,015); Bethlehem, PA
Jan 7; 7:00 pm		Navy	W 55–32	10–6 (3–0)	Agganis Arena (359); Boston, MA
Jan 11; 2:00 pm		at Lafayette	W 89–78	11–6 (4–0)	Kirby Sports Center (2,144); Easton, PA
Jan 15; 7:00 pm		Colgate	L 58–66	12–6 (5–0)	Agganis Arena (705); Boston, MA
Jan 20; 7:30 pm, CBSSN		Loyola (MD)	W 72–58	13–6 (6–0)	Agganis Arena (1,411); Boston, MA
Jan 22; 7:30 pm		at American	L 56–86	13–7 (6–1)	Bender Arena (2,268); Washington, D.C.
Jan 25; 2:00 pm, CBSSN		at Bucknell	W 64–61	14–7 (7–1)	Sojka Pavilion (3,790); Lewisburg, PA
Jan 29; 7:00 pm		Army	W 86–81 ^{OT}	15–7 (8–1)	Agganis Arena (913); Boston, MA
Feb 1; 1:00 pm		Lehigh	L 80–82 ^{OT}	15–8 (8–2)	Agganis Arena (968); Boston, MA
Feb 5; 7:00 pm		at Navy	W 61–48	16–8 (9–2)	Alumni Hall (1,763); Annapolis, MD
Feb 8; 1:00 pm		Lafayette	W 88–54	17–8 (10–2)	Agganis Arena (966); Boston, MA
Feb 12; 7:00 pm		at Colgate	W 76–74	18–8 (11–2)	Cotterell Court (594); Hamilton, NY
Feb 15; 8:00 pm, MASN		at Loyola (MD)	W 87–72	19–8 (12–2)	Reitz Arena (1,026); Baltimore, MD
Feb 19; 7:00 pm		American	W 71–62	20–8 (13–2)	Agganis Arena (1,262); Boston, MA
Feb 23; 12:00 pm		Bucknell	L 53–63	20–9 (13–3)	Agganis Arena (1,343); Boston, MA
Feb 26; 7:00 pm		at Army	W 71–70	21–9 (14–3)	Christl Arena (736); West Point, NY
Mar 1; 2:00 pm		at Holy Cross	W 68–64	22–9 (15–3)	Hart Center (2,711); Worcester, MA
Patriot League tournament
Mar 5; 7:00 pm	(1)	(9) Lafayette; Quarterfinals	W 91–54	23–9	Agganis Arena (915); Boston, MA
Mar 8; 3:30 pm, CBSSN	(1)	(5) Army; Semifinals	W 91–70	24–9	Agganis Arena (1,214); Boston, MA
Mar 12; 7:30 pm, CBSSN	(1)	(2) American; Championship	L 36–55	24–10	Agganis Arena (2,633); Boston, MA
NIT
Mar 19*; 7:00 pm, ESPN2	(7)	(2) Illinois; First round	L 62–66	24–11	Agganis Arena (1,327); Boston, MA
*Non-conference game. ^{#}Rankings from AP Poll, (#) during NIT is seed within region. (#) Tournament seedings in parentheses. All times are in Eastern Time.
