= 2013–14 Army Black Knights men's basketball team =

American college basketball season

2013–14 Army Black Knights men's basketball
- Conference: Patriot League
- Record: 15–16 (10–8 Patriot)
- Head coach: Zach Spiker (5th season)
- Assistant coaches: Jimmy Allen; Kevin App; Sean Rutigliano; Quinton Ferrell
- Home arena: Christl Arena

2013–14 Patriot League men's basketball standings
| | Conf. | | | | Overall |
| Team | W | | L | PCT | W | | L | PCT |
|---|---|---|---|---|---|---|---|---|
| Boston University | 15 | – | 3 | .833 | 24 | – | 11 | .686 |
| American † | 13 | – | 5 | .722 | 20 | – | 13 | .606 |
| Holy Cross | 12 | – | 6 | .667 | 20 | – | 14 | .588 |
| Bucknell | 11 | – | 7 | .611 | 16 | – | 14 | .533 |
| Army | 10 | – | 8 | .556 | 15 | – | 16 | .484 |
| Lehigh | 7 | – | 11 | .389 | 14 | – | 18 | .438 |
| Colgate | 6 | – | 12 | .333 | 13 | – | 18 | .419 |
| Loyola (MD) | 6 | – | 12 | .333 | 11 | – | 19 | .367 |
| Lafayette | 6 | – | 12 | .333 | 11 | – | 20 | .355 |
| Navy | 4 | – | 14 | .222 | 9 | – | 21 | .300 |
† 2014 Patriot League tournament winner

The 2013–14 Army Black Knights men's basketball team represented the United States Military Academy during the 2013–14 NCAA Division I men's basketball season. The Black Knights, led by fifth year head coach Zach Spiker, played their home games at Christl Arena and were members of the Patriot League. They finished the season 15–16, 10–8 in Patriot League play to finish in fifth place. They advanced to the semifinals of the Patriot League tournament where they lost to Boston University.

== Roster ==
| Number | Name | Position | Height | Weight | Year | Hometown |
|---|---|---|---|---|---|---|
| 0 | Maxwell Lenox | Guard | 6–0 | 190 | Junior | Fairfax, Virginia |
| 2 | Mo Williams | Guard | 6–1 | 185 | Junior | Fairfax, Virginia |
| 3 | Scott Mammel | Guard | 5–11 | 180 | Freshman | San Antonio, Texas |
| 4 | Shane Smith | Guard | 6–4 | 190 | Freshman | Norcross, Georgia |
| 5 | Milton Washington | Guard | 6–0 | 180 | Junior | Houston, Texas |
| 10 | Kennedy Edwards | Forward | 6–6 | 200 | Freshman | Northridge, California |
| 11 | Dylan Cox | Guard | 6–4 | 185 | Sophomore | Cedar Park, Texas |
| 12 | David Hellstrom | Guard | 6–4 | 185 | Sophomore | Rockford, Illinois |
| 14 | Matt Gramling | Guard | 6–3 | 190 | Sophomore | San Antonio, Texas |
| 20 | Mac Hoffman | Forward | 6–8 | 200 | Freshman | Pleasanton, California |
| 21 | Kyle Wilson | Guard/Forward | 6–4 | 190 | Sophomore | Mission Viejo, California |
| 22 | Jalen Harris | Guard | 5–10 | 150 | Junior | Pflugerville, Texas |
| 23 | Josh Herbeck | Guard | 6–3 | 190 | Senior | Ann Arbor, Michigan |
| 25 | Richard Brown | Forward | 6–6 | 210 | Freshman | Charlotte, North Carolina |
| 30 | Sean Billerman | Guard/Forward | 6–4 | 195 | Junior | Raleigh, North Carolina |
| 31 | Kevin Ferguson | Center | 6–10 | 200 | Sophomore | Berkeley Heights, New Jersey |
| 32 | Tanner Plomb | Forward | 6–7 | 200 | Sohpomore | Mukwonago, Wisconsin |
| 33 | Larry Toomey | Forward | 6–6 | 205 | Sophomore | St. Louis, Missouri |
| 34 | Kyle Weldon | Center | 6–9 | 195 | Sophomore | Clarksville, Tennessee |
| 40 | Austin Williamson | Forward | 6–8 | 240 | Freshman | Naples, Florida |
| 41 | Kieffer Jordan | Forward | 6–10 | 240 | Freshman | Tampa, Florida |
| 43 | Travis Rollo | Forward/Center | 6–7 | 205 | Sophomore | Mayer, Minnesota |
| 55 | Tanner Omlid | Forward | 6–3 | 215 | Freshman | Monmouth, Oregon |

== Schedule ==
| Date time, TV | Opponent | Result | Record | Site (attendance) city, state |
Regular season
| Nov 8*; 1:00 pm, ESPNU | vs. Air Force; All–Military Classic | L 68–79 | 0–1 | Cameron Hall (1,652); Lexington, VA |
| Nov 9*; 6:00 pm, ESPN3 | vs. The Citadel; All–Military Classic | W 84–69 | 1–1 | Cameron Hall (1,705); Lexington, VA |
| Nov 15*; 7:00 pm | NJIT | L 85–89 | 1–2 | Christl Arena (1,066); West Point, NY |
| Nov 19*; 7:00 pm | Delaware | L 74–89 | 1–3 | Christl Arena (569); West Point, NY |
| Nov 24*; 2:00 pm | at Notre Dame | L 60–93 | 1–4 | Purcell Pavilion (8,941); South Bend, IN |
| Nov 30*; 1:00 pm | Houston Baptist | L 72–74 ^{OT} | 1–5 | Christl Arena (706); West Point, NY |
| Dec 4*; 7:00 pm | at Columbia | L 64–81 | 1–6 | Levien Gymnasium (717); New York City, NY |
| Dec 7*; 3:00 pm | St. Francis Brooklyn | W 67–54 | 2–6 | Christl Arena (663); West Point, NY |
| Dec 13*; 6:00 pm | at Maine | W 90–80 | 3–6 | Cross Insurance Center (1,038); Bangor, ME |
| Dec 22*; 2:00 pm | at Rutgers | L 72–75 | 3–7 | The RAC (4,648); Piscataway, NJ |
| Dec 30*; 1:00 pm | Coast Guard | W 68–48 | 4–7 | Christl Arena (1,476); West Point, NY |
| Jan 2; 7:00 pm | at Lafayette | W 85–66 | 5–7 (1–0) | Kirby Sports Center (534); Easton, PA |
| Jan 5; 2:00 pm | Loyola (MD) | W 91–82 | 6–7 (2–0) | Christl Arena (1,076); West Point, NY |
| Jan 8; 7:00 pm | at Lehigh | W 79–76 | 7–7 (3–0) | Stabler Arena (915); Bethlehem, PA |
| Jan 11; 4:00 pm, CBSSN | at Navy | W 60–55 | 8–7 (4–0) | Alumni Hall (5,528); Annapolis, MD |
| Jan 15; 7:00 pm | Holy Cross | L 75–78 | 8–8 (4–1) | Christl Arena (783); West Point, NY |
| Jan 19; 3:00 pm, CBSSN | Bucknell | W 74–67 | 9–8 (5–1) | Christl Arena (1,350); West Point, NY |
| Jan 22; 7:00 pm | at Colgate | W 66–63 | 10–8 (6–1) | Cotterell Court (623); Hamilton, NY |
| Jan 24; 4:00 pm | American | L 74–84 | 10–9 (6–2) | Christl Arena (2,237); West Point, NY |
| Jan 29; 7:00 pm | at Boston University | L 81–86 ^{OT} | 10–10 (6–3) | Agganis Arena (913); Boston, MA |
| Feb 1; 1:00 pm | at Loyola (MD) | W 77–71 | 11–10 (7–3) | Reitz Arena (914); Baltimore, MD |
| Feb 5; 7:00 pm | Lehigh | W 70–51 | 12–10 (8–3) | Christl Arena (931); West Point, NY |
| Feb 8; 4:00 pm, CBSSN | Navy | L 57–79 | 12–11 (8–4) | Christl Arena (5,195); West Point, NY |
| Feb 12; 7:00 pm | at Holy Cross | L 63–66 | 12–12 (8–5) | Hart Center (1,547); Worcester, MA |
| Feb 15; 7:00 pm | at Bucknell | L 61–73 | 12–13 (8–6) | Sojka Pavilion (3,363); Lewisburg, PA |
| Feb 19; 7:00 pm | Colgate | W 74–66 | 13–13 (9–6) | Christl Arena (1,282); West Point, NY |
| Feb 22; 3:00 pm | at American | L 54–58 | 13–14 (9–7) | Bender Arena (1,788); Washington, D.C. |
| Feb 26; 7:00 pm | Boston University | L 70–71 | 13–15 (9–8) | Christl Arena (736); West Point, NY |
| Mar 1; 3:00 pm | Lafayette | W 87–84 | 14–15 (10–8) | Christl Arena (1,513); West Point, NY |
2014 Patriot League tournament
| Mar 5; 7:00 pm | at Bucknell; Quarterfinals | W 72–71 | 15–15 | Sojka Pavilion (1,704); Lewisburg, PA |
| Mar 8; 3:30 pm, CBSSN | at Boston University; Semifinals | L 70–91 | 15–16 | Agganis Arena (1,214); Boston, MA |
*Non-conference game. ^{#}Rankings from AP Poll. (#) Tournament seedings in parentheses. All times are in Eastern Time.
