= 2013–14 Lafayette Leopards men's basketball team =

American college basketball season

2013–14 Lafayette Leopards men's basketball
- Conference: Patriot League
- Record: 11–20 (6–12 Patriot)
- Head coach: Fran O'Hanlon (19th season)
- Assistant coaches: Pat Doherty; Donovan Williams; John O'Connor
- Home arena: Kirby Sports Center

2013–14 Patriot League men's basketball standings
	Conf.				Overall
Team	W		L	PCT	W		L	PCT
Boston University	15	–	3	.833	24	–	11	.686
American †	13	–	5	.722	20	–	13	.606
Holy Cross	12	–	6	.667	20	–	14	.588
Bucknell	11	–	7	.611	16	–	14	.533
Army	10	–	8	.556	15	–	16	.484
Lehigh	7	–	11	.389	14	–	18	.438
Colgate	6	–	12	.333	13	–	18	.419
Loyola (MD)	6	–	12	.333	11	–	19	.367
Lafayette	6	–	12	.333	11	–	20	.355
Navy	4	–	14	.222	9	–	21	.300
† 2014 Patriot League tournament winner

The 2013–14 Lafayette Leopards men's basketball team represented Lafayette College during the 2013–14 NCAA Division I men's basketball season. The Leopards, led by 19th year head coach Fran O'Hanlon, played their home games at the Kirby Sports Center and were members of the Patriot League. they finished the season 11–20, 6–12 in Patriot League play to finish in a three-way tie for seventh place. They advanced to the quarterfinals of the Patriot League tournament where they lost to Boston University.

== Roster ==
Number	Name	Position	Height	Weight	Year	Hometown
4	Jack Detmer	Guard	6–2	194	Senior	Scarsdale, New York
5	Joey Ptasinsky	Guard	6–2	174	Junior	Highlands Ranch, Colorado
11	Nick Lindner	Guard	5–10	161	Freshman	Doylestown, Pennsylvania
12	Seth Hinrichs	Guard	6–7	218	Junior	Clara City, Minnesota
14	Bryce Scott	Guard	6–3	188	Sophomore	El Dorado Hills, California
20	Dan Trist	Forward	6–9	246	Junior	Sydney, Australia
21	Zach Rufer	Guard	6–2	185	Sophomore	Bloomingburg, New York
22	Alan Flannigan	Forward	6–6	221	Junior	Dexter, Missouri
23	Les Smith	Guard	6–0	197	Senior	Cotati, California
24	Michael Hoffman	Forward	6–7	182	Freshman	Burleson, Texas
32	Monty Boykins	Guard	6–4	192	Freshman	West Chester, Ohio
33	Jake Newman	Guard	6–6	195	Freshman	Surrey, British Columbia
34	Ben Freeland	Forward	6–9	196	Sophomore	Santa Rosa, California
44	Billy Murphy	Forward	6–9	210	Sophomore	Greenwich, Connecticut
54	Nathaniel Musters	Center	6–10	255	Sophomore	Padstow, Australia

== Schedule ==
Date time, TV	Opponent	Result	Record	Site (attendance) city, state
Regular season
Nov 8*; 8:00 pm, FS2	at Villanova	L 59–75	0–1	The Pavilion (6,500); Villanova, PA
Nov 12*; 7:00 pm	Robert Morris	L 81–90	0–2	Kirby Sports Center (1,605); Easton, PA
Nov 20*; 7:00 pm	at Princeton	L 80–81 ^{OT}	0–3	Jadwin Gymnasium (1,403); Princeton, NJ
Nov 23*; 2:00 pm	at NJIT	L 88–91 ^{OT}	0–4	Fleisher Center (1,403); Newark, NJ
Nov 26*; 7:00 pm	Yale	L 76–79	0–5	Kirby Sports Center (1,154); Easton, PA
Nov 30*; 2:00 pm	Penn	W 79–76	1–5	Kirby Sports Center (1,154); Easton, PA
Dec 3*; 7:00 pm	at Wagner	W 77–65	2–5	Spiro Sports Center (1,375); Staten Island, NY
Dec 7*; 7:00 pm	at Sacred Heart	W 86–79	3–5	William H. Pitt Center (451); Fairfield, CT
Dec 17*; 7:00 pm	Immaculata	W 79–54	4–5	Kirby Sports Center (743); Easton, PA
Dec 19*; 7:00 pm	at St. Francis Brooklyn	L 62–65	4–6	Generoso Pope Athletic Complex (413); Brooklyn, NY
Dec 27*; 8:00 pm, FS1	at Seton Hall	L 58–90	4–7	Prudential Center (1,779); Newark, NJ
Jan 2; 7:00 pm	Army	L 66–85	4–8 (0–1)	Kirby Sports Center (534); Easton, PA
Jan 5; 2:00 pm	at Navy	L 71–79	4–9 (0–2)	Alumni Hall (2,405); Annapolis, MD
Jan 8; 7:00 pm	Bucknell	L 86–96	4–10 (0–3)	Kirby Sports Center (2,314); Easton, PA
Jan 11; 2:00 pm	Boston University	L 78–89	4–11 (0–4)	Kirby Sports Center (2,144); Easton, PA
Jan 13; 7:30 pm, CBSSN	at Loyola (MD)	L 63–77	4–12 (0–5)	Reitz Arena (1,378); Baltimore, MD
Jan 18; 2:00 pm	at American	L 61–66	4–13 (0–6)	Bender Arena (2,676); Washington, D.C.
Jan 22; 7:00 pm	Holy Cross	L 58–59	4–14 (0–7)	Kirby Sports Center (1,789); Easton, PA
Jan 25; 7:00 pm	at Lehigh	L 68–71	4–15 (0–8)	Stabler Arena (1,983); Bethlehem, PA
Jan 27; 9:00 pm, CBSSN	Colgate	L 68–75	4–16 (0–9)	Kirby Sports Center (1,825); Easton, PA
Feb 1; 2:00 pm	Navy	W 72–54	5–16 (1–9)	Kirby Sports Center (2,142); Easton, PA
Feb 5; 7:00 pm	at Bucknell	W 66–58	6–16 (2–9)	Sojka Pavilion (2,419); Lewisburg, PA
Feb 8; 1:00 pm	at Boston University	L 54–88	6–17 (2–10)	Agganis Arena (966); Boston, MA
Feb 12; 7:00 pm	Loyola (MD)	W 61–44	7–17 (3–10)	Kirby Sports Center (1,244); Easton, PA
Feb 15; 2:00 pm	American	W 74–62	8–17 (4–10)	Kirby Sports Center (2,134); Easton, PA
Feb 19; 7:00 pm	at Holy Cross	W 76–64	9–17 (5–10)	Hart Center (1,043); Worcester, MA
Feb 23; 12:00 pm	Lehigh	W 77–71	10–17 (6–10)	Kirby Sports Center (2,648); Easton, PA
Feb 26; 7:00 pm	at Colgate	L 66–83	10–18 (6–11)	Cotterell Court (692); Hamilton, NY
Mar 1; 3:00 pm	at Army	L 84–87	10–19 (6–12)	Christl Arena (1,513); West Point, NY
2014 Patriot League tournament
Mar 3; 7:30 pm	at Loyola (MD); First Round	W 84–71	11–19	Reitz Arena (318); Baltimore, MD
Mar 5; 7:00 pm	at Boston University; Quarterfinals	L 54–91	11–20	Agganis Arena (915); Boston, MA
*Non-conference game. ^{#}Rankings from AP Poll. (#) Tournament seedings in parentheses. All times are in Eastern Time.
