= Stafford Cassell =

American football and basketball coach (1909–1966)

- Cassell pictured in Aucola 1941, American University yearbook

Biographical details
- Born: February 8, 1909; Asberry, Virginia, U.S.
- Died: April 16, 1966 (aged 57); Washington, D.C., U.S.

Playing career

Football
- c. 1935: American

Basketball
- c. 1935: American
- Position: Quarterback (football)

Coaching career (HC unless noted)

Football
- 1940–1941: American
- 1942: Morningside

Basketball
- 1937–1942: American
- 1946–1952: American

Administrative career (AD unless noted)
- 1937–1939: American (assistant AD)
- 1939–1941: American
- 1942–?: Morningside

Head coaching record
- Overall: 4–13–1 (football); 152–89 (basketball)

Stafford Hendricks "Pop" Cassell (February 8, 1909 – April 16, 1966) was an American college football and college basketball coach.

== Coaching career ==
Cassell was the head football coach at American University in Washington, D.C. from 1940 to 1941 and at the Morningside College in Sioux City, Iowa in 1942. His coaching record at Morningside was 2–6. His coaching record at American was 2–7–1.

== Legacy ==
He was buried in Arlington National Cemetery. In 1969, American University established the Stafford H. Cassell Hall of Fame in his honor.

== Head coaching record ==
=== Football ===
Year	Team	Overall	Conference	Standing	Bowl/playoffs
American Eagles (Independent) (1940–1941)
1940	American	1–2–1			
1941	American	1–5			
American:		2–7–1			
Morningside Maroons (North Central Conference) (1942)
1942	Morningside	2–6	1–6	7th	
Morningside:		2–6	1–6		
Total:		4–13–1			
