= 2014 Patriot League men's basketball tournament =

- Classification: Division I
- Season: 2013–14
- Teams: 10
- Site: Campus sites
- Champions: American (3rd title)
- Winning coach: Mike Brennan (1st title)
- MVP: Darius Gardner (American)
- Attendance: 11,472
- Television: CBS Sports Network

2013–14 Patriot League men's basketball standings
	Conf.				Overall
Team	W		L	PCT	W		L	PCT
Boston University	15	–	3	.833	24	–	11	.686
American †	13	–	5	.722	20	–	13	.606
Holy Cross	12	–	6	.667	20	–	14	.588
Bucknell	11	–	7	.611	16	–	14	.533
Army	10	–	8	.556	15	–	16	.484
Lehigh	7	–	11	.389	14	–	18	.438
Colgate	6	–	12	.333	13	–	18	.419
Loyola (MD)	6	–	12	.333	11	–	19	.367
Lafayette	6	–	12	.333	11	–	20	.355
Navy	4	–	14	.222	9	–	21	.300
† 2014 Patriot League tournament winner

The 2014 Patriot League men's basketball tournament was held March 3, 5, 8 and 12 at campus sites of the higher seed. The winner of the tournament received an automatic bid to the NCAA tournament.

== Seeds ==
Teams were seeded by conference record, with a ties broken by record between the tied teams followed by record against the regular-season champion, if necessary.

Seed	School	Conference	Overall	Tiebreaker
1	Boston	15–3	22–9	
2	American	13–5	17–12	
3	Holy Cross	12–6	18–12	
4	Bucknell	11–7	16–13	
5	Army	10–8	14–15	
6	Lehigh	7–11	14–17	
7	Colgate	6–12	12–17	3–1 vs. Laf/Loy
8	Loyola (MD)	6–12	11–18	2–2 vs. Col/Laf
9	Lafayette	6–12	10–19	1–3 vs. Col/Loy
10	Navy	4–14	9–20	

== Schedule ==
Game	Time*	Matchup^{#}	Television	Attendance
First round – Monday, March 3
1	7:30 pm	#9 Lafayette at #8 Loyola (MD)		318
2	7:00 pm	#10 Navy at #7 Colgate		1,345
Quarterfinals – Wednesday, March 5
3	7:00 pm	#9 Lafayette at #1 Boston		915
4	7:00 pm	#5 Army at #4 Bucknell		1,704
5	7:00 pm	#6 Lehigh at #3 Holy Cross		1,027
6	7:30 pm	#7 Colgate at #2 American		913
Semifinals – Saturday, March 8
7	3:30 pm	#5 Army at #1 Boston	CBSSN	1,214
8	5:30 pm	#3 Holy Cross at #2 American	CBSSN	1,403
Championship – Wednesday, March 12
9	7:30 pm	#2 American at #1 Boston	CBSSN	2,633
*Game times in ET. #-Rankings denote tournament seeding.

== Bracket ==
First round March 3
8	Loyola (MD)	71
9	Lafayette	84
7	Colgate	57
10	Navy	51

Quarterfinals; March 5
1	Boston University	91
9	Lafayette	54
4	Bucknell	71
5	Army	72
2	American	59
7	Colgate	50
3	Holy Cross	54
6	Lehigh	48

Semifinals; March 8 CBS Sports Network
1	Boston University	91
5	Army	70
2	American	57
3	Holy Cross	46

Championship; March 12; CBS Sports Network
1	Boston University	36
2	American	55
