= David Livingston Carrasco =

American government official and college basketball coach

- Born: 1919/1920
- Died: October 17, 1990 (age 70); El Paso, Texas, U.S.
- Known for: Job Corps in El Paso; head basketball coach at American University

Davíd Livingston Carrasco was an American government official and college basketball coach.

Carrasco was a native of El Segundo Barrio in El Paso, Texas, and graduated from the Texas College of Mines. He played professional basketball in Chihuahua, Mexico, and was on the Mexico national basketball team in the 1938 Central American and Caribbean Games.

Carrasco then worked as a teacher before serving in the United States Navy during World War II. After the war, he earned a master's degree at the University of Maryland, College Park, and then coached boys' basketball at Montgomery Blair High School in Silver Spring, Maryland, where he won three state championships as head coach from 1951 to 1955.

In 1956, Carrasco was hired as the athletic director for American University, where he was also the head basketball coach. He integrated the American Eagles basketball team by recruiting black players for the first time, and the team won three Eastern Regional Division II NCAA basketball championships in the late 1950s. Carrasco was the first Mexican American to serve as the head coach of a men's basketball team at a major university in the United States.

In 1965, Carrasco left American to become regional Peace Corps director in Ecuador. He was Olympic attaché to the U.S. Embassy in Mexico City for the 1968 Summer Olympics. He returned to El Paso in 1969 to start a Job Corps program there.

The El Paso Job Corps opened under Carrasco's leadership in September 1970, and it developed into one of the most successful programs in the country. After his death, the facility was dedicated as the David L. Carrasco Job Corps Center.

Carrasco died in El Paso on October 17, 1990, by suicide.
