= George Springston =

American football and basketball player and coach (1898–1963)

Biographical details
- Born: November 11, 1898; Peoria, Illinois, U.S.
- Died: December 30, 1963 (aged 65)

Playing career

Football
- 1920: Illinois
- 1921: George Washington

Basketball
- 1921–1922: George Washington

Coaching career (HC unless noted)

Football
- 1925–1928: American

Basketball
- 1926–1929: American

Administrative career (AD unless noted)
- 1925–1929: American

George Ballie Springston (November 11, 1898 – December 30, 1963) was an American college football and basketball player and coach. He served as the head football coach at American University in Washington, D.C. from 1925 to 1928. He was buried in Arlington National Cemetery.
