= Mike Brennan (basketball) =

American basketball coach

Princeton Tigers
- Position: Assistant coach
- League: Ivy League

Personal information
- Born: May 18, 1972 (age 54) Elizabeth, New Jersey, U.S.

Career information
- College: Princeton
- Playing career: 1996–2000
- Coaching career: 1995–present

Career history

Playing
- 1996-1997: Bayer Leverkusen
- 1997-1998: SG Braunschweig
- 1998-1999: RBC Pepinster

Coaching
- 1995–1996: Columbia (vol. asst.)
- 2000–2007: Princeton (assistant)
- 2007–2009: American (assistant)
- 2009–2013: Georgetown (assistant)
- 2013–2023: American
- 2023–2024: Loyola (MD) (assistant)
- 2024–2025: Cornell (assistant)
- 2025–present: Princeton (AHC)

Career highlights
- As head coach: Patriot League tournament (2014); Patriot League Coach of the Year (2014)

Michael Richard Brennan (born May 18, 1972) is an American college basketball coach and former player who is currently the associate head coach at Princeton University, his alma mater. He was previously the head coach of American University, and an assistant coach at several other schools.

== Playing career ==
Brennan won two Ivy League titles with the Princeton Tigers. He played for the Tigers between 1990 and 1994, averaging 5.0 points, 2.4 rebounds and 1.7 assists per game. Professionally, he spent time in the German Basketball Bundesliga (at Bayer Leverkusen in 1996–97 and Braunschweig in 1997–98), Belgium (at Pepinster in 1998–99) and Portugal.

== Coaching career ==
=== Early career ===
Brennan was a volunteer assistant coach at Columbia University for one year, before returning to Princeton as an assistant coach from 2000 to 2007. After being an assistant coach at Princeton, he became an assistant coach at American University from 2007 to 2009. He then spent the next four years as an assistant coach for Georgetown University.

=== American (2013-2023) ===
Brennan was named the head coach at American in April 2013. In his first season the Eagles were picked picked to finish ninth in the Patriot League in the preseason poll. Brennan subsequently led them to a second place regular-season finish in the conference, a Patriot League tournament championship, and a bid to the 2014 NCAA Tournament. He was named 2014 Patriot League Coach of the Year based on this turnaround.

On March 9, 2023, Brennan was fired following a March 5 double overtime loss in the Patriot League tournament semifinals.

=== Return to assistant coaching ===
Following his dismissal from American, Brennan served as an assistant coach at Loyola University (MD) and Cornell University before returning to Princeton in 2025 as the team's associate head coach.

== Personal life ==
Brennan, an American citizen, also holds an Irish passport.

== Head coaching record ==
Record table
Season	Team	Overall	Conference	Standing	Postseason
American Eagles (Patriot League) (2013–2023)
2013–14	American	20–13	13–5	2nd	NCAA Round of 64
2014–15	American	17–16	8–10	T–6th	
2015–16	American	12–19	9–9	T–4th	
2016–17	American	8–22	5–13	T–9th	
2017–18	American	6–24	3–15	10th	
2018–19	American	15–15	9–9	4th	
2019–20	American	16–14	12–6	T–2nd	
2020–21	American	4–6	4–5	2nd (South)	
2021–22	American	10–22	5–13	10th	
2022–23	American	17–15	7–11	T–6th	
American:		125–166 (.430)	74–96 (.435)		
Total:		125–166 (.430)			
National champion Postseason invitational champion Conference regular season champion Conference regular season and conference tournament champion Division regular season champion Division regular season and conference tournament champion Conference tournament champion
