= American Eagles =

Sports club of American University

- University: American University
- Nickname: Eagles
- NCAA: Division I
- Conference: Patriot League (primary); EIWA (wrestling)
- Athletic director: JM Caparro
- Location: Washington, D.C.
- Varsity teams: 14 (6 men's & 8 women's)
- Basketball arena: Bender Arena
- Soccer stadium: Reeves Field and Greenberg Track
- Volleyball arena: Bender Arena
- Other venues: William I. Jacobs Recreational Complex
- Colors: Blue, white, and red
- Mascot: Clawed, Z. Eagle
- Fight song: All hail the mighty AU Eagles!
- Website: aueagles.com
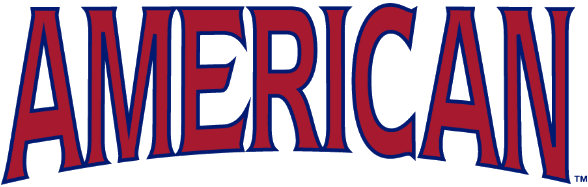

The American Eagles are the athletics teams that represent the American University in National Collegiate Athletic Association (NCAA) Division I competition. American is a member of the Patriot League in all sports except wrestling, where it is a member of the Eastern Intercollegiate Wrestling Association. Many of the teams have gone on to win championships over the years, particularly their field hockey, volleyball, and wrestling teams. The team colors are red and blue.

== Sponsored sports ==
Men's sports	Women's sports
Basketball	Basketball
Cross country	Cross country
Soccer	Field hockey
Swimming	Lacrosse
Track and field	Soccer
Wrestling	Swimming
	Track and field^{1}
	Volleyball
^{1} – includes both indoor and outdoor

== Athletic directors ==
=== Early athletic directors ===
American University was founded in 1893, and the first building opened for classes in 1907. But it wasn't until the fall of 1925 that the university organized intercollegiate athletics. The university fielded both a men's and women's basketball team, and a football team. George Springston was appointed athletic director (AD) and head coach of the men's basketball team and football team, fielding his first teams in October 1925.

In February 1929, Springston resigned and Walter Young was named his replacement the same day. On October 16, 1931, a new football stadium called "American University Field" was opened. Young resigned as AD on January 30, 1937. He had signaled his intention to resign as AD and head coach of the football and basketball teams in the fall of 1937, but a serious automobile accident in late January prompted him to resign suddenly.

On February 4, 1937, AU announced the hiring of Gus Welch as its athletic director. Welch had been a football teammate of legendary player Jim Thorpe at Carlisle Indian Industrial School in Carlisle, Pennsylvania, where he was coached by the equally legendary Glenn "Pop" Warner. He had played two years of professional football with the Canton Bulldogs (from 1915 to 1917) prior to his service in World War I. After the war, he was head football coach at Washington State University from 1919 to 1922, head football coach at Randolph Macon College from 1923 to 1929, head football coach at the University of Virginia from 1930 to 1933, and AD and head football coach at Haskell Indian Nations University from 1933 to 1936. Welch provide to be highly popular, even though AU had so few students he could barely field an 11-man football team. He told witty stories to the press, and pulled stunt after stunt to try to get his football team to win. He once tried to play a female student as a place kicker, but referees wouldn't allow it. At least once, he dressed cheerleaders and other students in football uniforms and had them sit on the bench to fool opposing teams into thinking he had a bigger team and more depth that reported. Frustrated with the lack of football recruits, Welch resigned suddenly as coach and AD on December 6, 1938.

=== The Cassell era ===
Welch's assistant, Stafford H. Cassell, was named Welch's successor as AD on February 27, 1939. Cassell was an AU graduate who had played football, basketball, and baseball at the university in the early 1930s, and he was considered a star basketball player. He was named men's basketball coach in 1937. Because of the outbreak of World War II, AU dropped football after the 1941 season. Subsequently, Cassell resigned in March 1942 to become athletic director and head football coach at Morningside College in Iowa. He departed AU in June. Don Cooper was named Cassell's replacement as athletic director on May 23, 1942. He had previously been the assistant men's basketball and football coach and the head track coach at Beloit College in Wisconsin. But after less than a month on the job, Cooper stepped down to join the U.S. Army.

Gustaf Bernhard "Gus" Kalijarvi was named AU's athletic director on August 30, 1942. He had previously served as AD at St. Johnsbury Academy in Vermont.

Kalijvari left the university in 1944 to become the athletic director at Cheshire Academy in Connecticut. Due to the emergency caused by World War II and the limited sports schedule, he was not replaced until Stafford Cassell returned to AU as athletic director on January 3, 1946. During the interim, and during the years of Cassell's second tenure, the AU men's basketball team won the Mason–Dixon Conference championship in 1945, 1946, 1950, and 1951. Cassell resigned on March 10, 1952, to become an aide to new AU President Hurst Robins Anderson.

=== The Frailey era ===
Cassell was replaced in March 1952 by Hugo "Dutch" Schulze, a former captain of the AU men's basketball team and an outstanding football and baseball player at the school in the 1930s. Schulze replaced Artie Boyd as men's head basketball coach, but he was only able to lead the team to a dismal 50–51 record. Schulze resigned on November 8, 1958.

David Carrasco was named AU's new AD upon Schulze's retirement on November 8. He resigned in 1964.

In 1965, AU hired Robert Frailey as its new athletic director. Frailey became the university's longest-serving AD, retiring in 1987 after 22 years on the job. Frailey head previously served for 16 years as coach of the men's swim team, and later coached the men's tennis, golf, and soccer teams. While AD, Frailey moved AU from NCAA Division II to NCAA Division I, and hired some of the best basketball coaches in the nation: Gary Williams, later head coach at the University of Maryland; Jim Lynam, later head coach of the Washington Bullets professional basketball team; Tom Davis, later head coach at the University of Iowa; Tom Young, later head coach at Rutgers University; Ed Tapscott, later an NBA executive for several teams; and Fran Dunphy, later coach at the University of Pennsylvania and Temple University. In 1979, Frailey named and co-founded the Colonial Athletic Association, the NCAA Division I league in which AU teams now began to participate. As his career neared its end, Fraily pushed hard for construction of a new sports arena at American University to replace the Leonard Center (later named the Cassell Center), which the university had purchased in 1946. The new facility, Bender Arena opened in 1988. The swimming pool was named Frailey Pool in his honor.

=== O'Donnell-McElroy era ===
Joseph F. O'Donnell was appointed Frailey's successor on February 4, 1987. He was formerly an assistant athletic director at Wichita State University. O'Donnell served as AD until June 2, 1995. Ed Tapscott, AU's men's basketball coach since 1982, left the school in April 1990.

In December 1991, Pete Mehlert, men's head soccer coach who led the AU soccer team to a national championship, was fired by O'Donnell after clashing with him repeatedly.

In November 1994, Benjamin Ladner became the new president of American University. O'Donnell resigned on June 2, 1995, after Ladner threatened to fire him. Barbara Reimann, associate athletic director, was appointed acting athletic director.

On March 3, 1996, AU announced that Lee McElroy would become the university's first African American athletic director, and the first athletic director to have a doctorate. Dr. McElroy had served a single year as AD at the University of the District of Columbia before moving to Sacramento State University in 1989. During his tenure, McElroy hired Art Perry to be men's head basketball coach. But Perry was fired in March 2000, and President Ladner led the search for Perry's successor (usurping McElroy's role). Ladner also forced McElroy to switch AU's affiliation from the Colonial Athletic Association to the Patriot League. Allegedly frustrated by Ladner's interference, on July 5, 2000, McElroy announced he was resigning to become athletic director at the State University of New York at Albany.

=== Transitional ADs ===
From January 1, 2000, to March 31, 2007, American University had five athletic directors. Three of them lasted less than three years, leading to instability and a loss of institutional memory in the Athletic Department.

Dan Radakovich was named McElroy's successor on September 11, 2000. Radakovich had previously served as the chief financial officer of the athletic department at the University of South Carolina. Radakovich resigned after just eight months on the job to become senior associate athletic director at Louisiana State University.

In November 2001, Ladner hired Tom George, a 20-year veteran of sports industry marketing with Octagon, to be the university's new AD. George resigned effective July 31, 2003, to return to the sports marketing field. Although his tenure was short, George was able to win national television appearances for AU's women's volleyball and men's basketball teams, and major press coverage of the AU men's soccer and track and field teams.

Dr. Joni Comstock became AU's first permanent female athletic director when she was hired on November 12, 2003. She had previously served as the athletic director at the University of North Carolina at Asheville since 2000 and had been an assistant athletic director and senior associate athletic director at Purdue University for 11 years before that. Comstock resigned on August 24, 2006, to take a position with the NCAA.

=== Kerwin-era ADs ===
In November 2005, Dr. Neil Kerwin became president of American University. Changes in the university's approach to athletics, made under his predecessor, Dr. Benjamin Ladner, began to bear fruit in championship teams and national press attention. Stability in the athletic director position also contributed to an enhanced athletic program at the university.

After a nearly seven-month search, President Kerwin hired Keith Gill as AU's new athletic director on March 21, 2007. Gill had previously been assistant athletic director at Vanderbilt University for two years, Director of Membership Services at the NCAA for five years, and senior associate athletic director at the University of Oklahoma for four years. AU's athletic teams won 25 team championships and 16 individual championships during his tenure. The men's basketball team won the Patriot League title back-to-back in the 2007-2008 and 2008–2009 seasons. The men's cross country, women's field hockey, and women's volleyball teams also won Patriot League championships. Gill resigned in December 2012 to become AD at the University of Richmond.

On February 28, 2013, President Kerwin announced that AU had hired Dr. William "Billy" Walker to be the new athletic director. He joined the AU staff on April 3, 2013. A graduate of the United States Air Force Academy (USAFA), Walker was deputy director of athletics and professor and head of the Physical Education Department at the Air Force Academy. Dr. Walker retired from the Air Force in July 2013 at the rank of brigadier general, and awarded the Legion of Merit. During his first year as AD, the women's field hockey, women's volleyball, and men's basketball teams won Patriot League championships. The women's volleyball repeated as Patriot League champions in 2013–2014, and were joined by the women's basketball team.

== Conference history ==
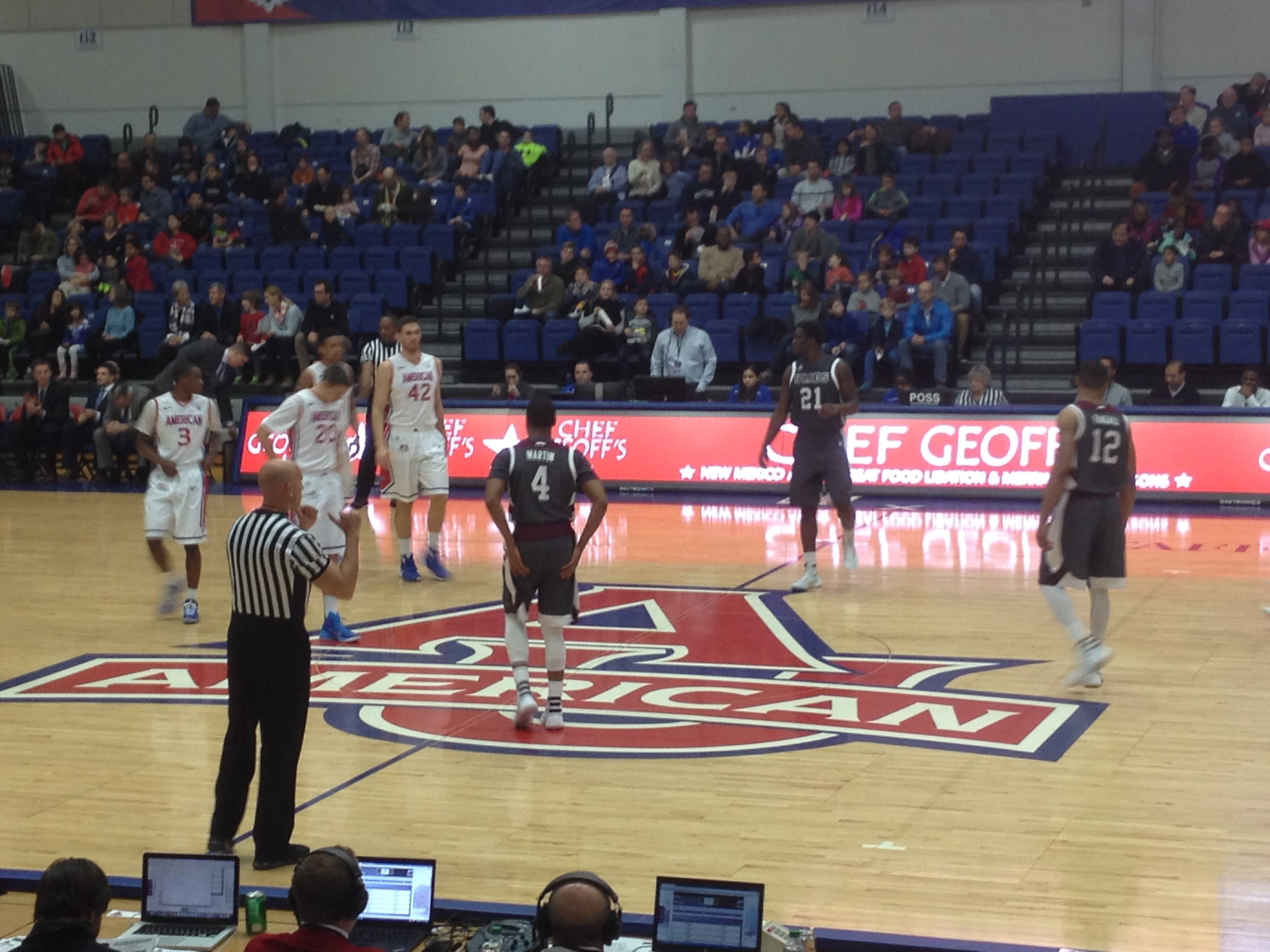
Bender Arena, home of American's men's and women's basketball, wrestling, and volleyball teams

American University's intercollegiate athletic program did not begin until 1925, and for the first 11 years of the program's existence AU was not a member of a formally organized athletic conference. AU became a founding member in 1936 of the Mason–Dixon Conference, in which it participated until 1966.

In 1966, AU moved from NCAA Division II to NCAA Division I, and joined the Middle Atlantic Conference (MAC) effective September 1, 1966.

In February 1974, AU became a founding member of the East Coast Conference. The conference formed after several years of discussion by AU and 11 other schools which played in the University Division of the MAC.

In 1984, the Eastern College Athletic Conference (ECAC) South voted to begin hosting championships in sports other than basketball. AU agreed to join the ECAC-South in March 1984. The ECAC-South changed its name to the Colonial Athletic Association in June 1985.

By 2000, the CAA was down to just eight member schools. American University officials worried about the level of competition in the league, and the level of concern rose dramatically when the NCAA announced it was considering no longer extending automatic bids to the NCAA Men's Division I Basketball Championship for leagues with fewer than eight members. Athletic Director Dr. Lee McElroy and President Benjamin Ladner began talks with the Patriot League, discussions which became more serious after the United States Naval Academy said it would join the Patriot League if AU did. The Patriot League formally invited AU to join the conference in mid-March 2000. But according to an anonymous source, nearly all of the coaches at AU resisted the conference switch. The CAA allowed AU to offer athletic scholarships in all sports, while the Patriot League only permitted this in basketball. They were also concerned that the level of play in the Patriot League was of much lower quality than in the CAA, and that attendance at AU sporting events would drop significantly. More local colleges played in the CAA than in the Patriot League, which critics felt meant higher attendance. In response, the Patriot League allowed AU to continue to offer athletic scholarships in all sports. About 50 student-athletes at AU led a public protest against the move on March 28. Many of AU's top athletic stars vowed to transfer to another school if AU changes conferences.

On April 24, 2000, American University announced it would join the Patriot League beginning with the 2001–2002 season. AU President Ladner decided to make the switch after judging the commitment to academics of the other Patriot League schools, most of which were private schools like AU. In the CAA, only one other school was private. Another factor was the make-up of AU's student body, 30 percent of which came from the geographic area covered by the Patriot League. (Only five percent of AU's student body came from geographic areas covered by the CAA.) This would enhance AU's non-athletic fundraising and recruitment, Ladner felt. AU officials also felt the Patriot League was more stable than the CAA, which had seen high turnover in membership over the past few years.

The Eagles continue to play in the Patriot League, with the exception of the AU wrestling team. Although AU's wrestling program had a long history, by 2001 the program was in deep trouble. The team had a long losing streak in NCAA competition, and President Ladner considered closing the program. Instead, Ladner agreed to infuse the program with a significant amount of new funding and make AU into a national wrestling powerhouse. Since the Patriot League did not offer wrestling as a sport, AU's wrestling team affiliated with the Eastern Intercollegiate Wrestling Association, the nation's oldest wrestling conference, beginning with the 2002–2003 season. The wrestling program was helped after AU closed its men's and women's tennis and golf programs at the end of the 2004–2005 academic year, and in 2007 redshirt junior Josh Glenn won the 197-pound title at the NCAA Division I wrestling championships. Glenn became AU's first national champion in any sport since 1966, and the school's first since it moved to NCAA Division I. Glenn also became AU's first two-time All-American.

== Sports facilities ==
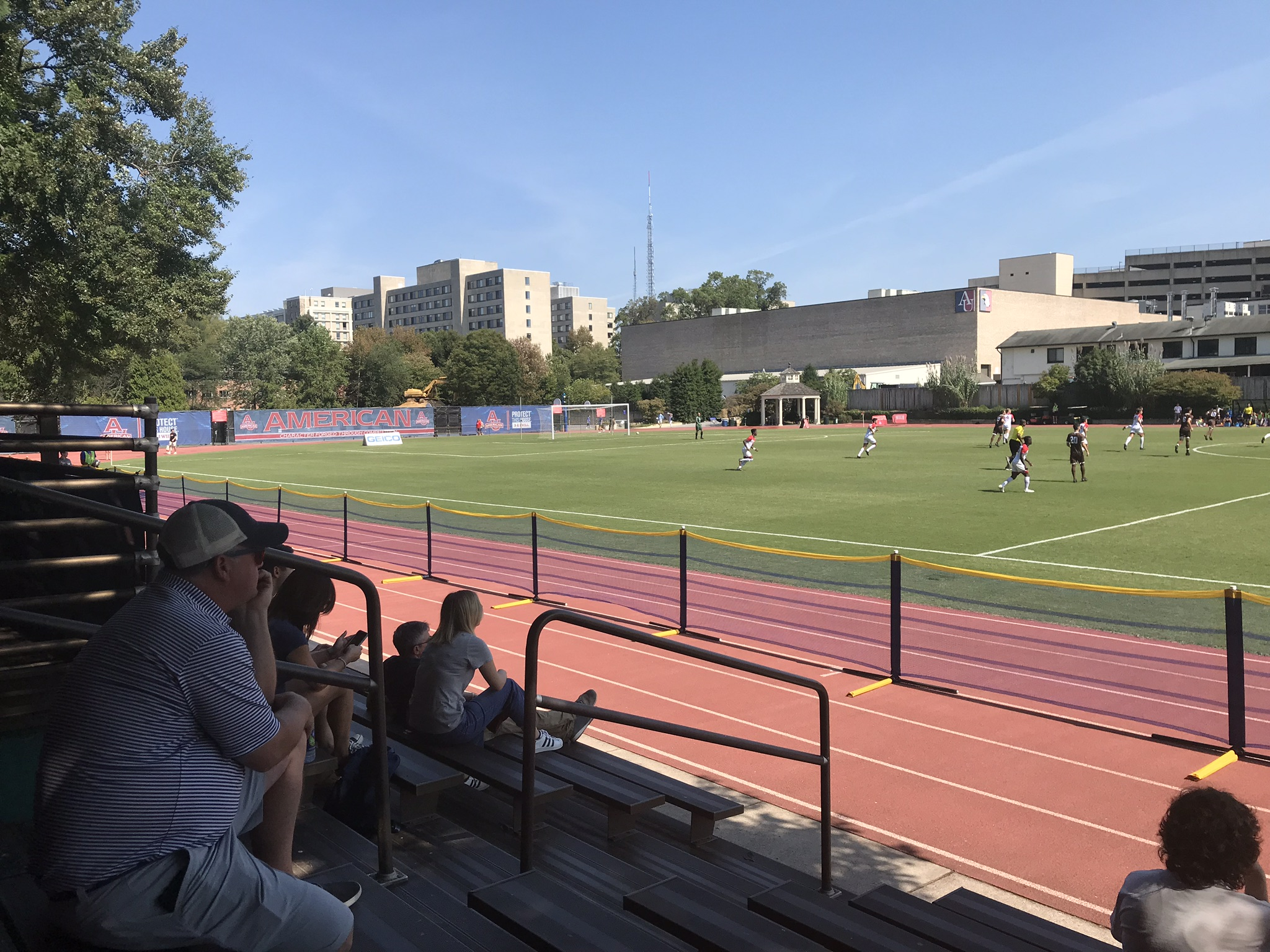
Reeves Field, home of American's men's and women's soccer teams

American University has several sports facilities, including Bender Arena, which houses the William I Jacobs Fitness Center; 25-yard, eight-lane pool; the Reeves Aquatic Center, a six-store mini-mall, the campus bookstore, and a 470-car, seven-level parking structure. Bender Arena is also the home of AU's basketball team and AU's nationally ranked wrestling team.

Reeves Field home to AU's soccer team, is one of the premier soccer fields in Washington, D.C. Reeves Field earned the 2002 College Soccer Field of the Year by the Sports Turf Managers Association, hosted its fifth NCAA Tournament game, and served as the training site for the Uruguayan National Soccer team. FC Barcelona and Blackburn used Reeves Field as a training facility. In the summer of 2000, AU served as the practice site for Newcastle United, one of England's premier professional soccer clubs. Major League Soccer's D.C. United, Miami Fusion and San Jose Earthquakes have also practiced at AU. National teams from the United States, Bolivia and Portugal trained at Reeves in 1996 in preparation for Summer Olympic games held at RFK Stadium.

Reeves Field also features Greenberg Track. It is a six-lane track used to accommodate the track and field programs at AU. During his term as vice-president, George H. W. Bush regularly traveled in the morning from his home at the U.S. Naval Observatory, located about two miles from American University, to run the track at Reeves Field.

AU's field hockey and women's lacrosse teams play on the field at the William I. Jacobs Recreational Complex, which also features a softball diamond and two outdoor sand volleyball courts. AU's field hockey team earned the right to host the 2005 Patriot League Tournament, where American defeated Lehigh University 7–0 in the semifinals before capturing the league crown for the third straight year by downing Holy Cross 4–2 in the Championship Game.

American University formerly featured seven outdoor tennis courts for the use of the intercollegiate tennis teams as well as the university community. They demolished the tennis courts in the spring of 2024 in order to build an expanded athletics facility, the Meltzer Center. Two outdoor basketball courts completed the outdoor recreational facility located next to Reeves Field and behind Bender Arena. AU hosted three Patriot League tennis team championships after joining the Patriot League, with the men's team winning back-to-back titles on the AU hardcourts and setting Patriot League Championship attendance records each year. The women's team last captured the Patriot League title in 2002. Both the women's and men's tennis teams were discontinued in 2006.

Bender Arena is also the home to the AU Volleyball team which was coached by AU Hall of Famer Barry Goldberg for 34 years until he passed in March 2023.

== Hall of fame ==
In 1969, American University established an athletics Hall of Fame and named it the Stafford H. Cassell Hall of Fame, in honor of the school's late football coach, athletic director, and vice president.

== Notable athletes ==
- Keira D'Amato, distance runner
- Brian Gilgeous, men's basketball
- Andre Ingram, men's basketball; played 6 games for the Los Angeles Lakers after several years in the NBA G League
- Howard Lassoff, American-Israeli basketball player
- Kermit Washington, All-American men's basketball player

== See also ==
- American Eagles wrestling
