= American Eagles men's basketball =

Men's college basketball team

2026–27 American Eagles men's basketball team
- University: American University
- Head coach: Duane Simpkins (4th season)
- Location: Washington, D.C.
- Arena: Bender Arena (capacity: 3,044)
- Conference: Patriot
- Nickname: Eagles
- Colors: Blue, white, and red
- Student section: Blue Crew

NCAA Division I tournament Elite Eight
- NCAA Division II; 1958, 1959, 1960

NCAA Division I tournament Sweet Sixteen
- NCAA Division II; 1958, 1959, 1960

NCAA Division I tournament appearances
- NCAA Division II; 1951, 1958, 1959, 1960; NCAA Division I 2008, 2009, 2014, 2025

Conference tournament champions
- 2008, 2009, 2014, 2025

Conference regular-season champions
- Mason–Dixon Conference: 1945, 1946, 1950, 1951, 1958, 1959, 1960; ECC: 1975, 1981, 1983; Patriot League: 2002, 2004, 2008, 2009, 2025

Uniforms
Home	Away

The American Eagles men's basketball team represents American University in Washington, D.C. in NCAA Division I competition. The school's team competes in the Patriot League and play their home games in Bender Arena. Their rivals include the Boston University Terriers, Bucknell Bison, and Navy Midshipmen. Duane Simpkins was appointed the program's 18th head coach on April 1, 2023. The Eagles have appeared four times in the NCAA Division I men's basketball tournament, most recently in 2025.

== Postseason history ==
=== NCAA Division I Tournament results ===
The Eagles have appeared in the NCAA Division I tournament four times. Their combined record is 0–4.

Year	Seed	Round	Opponent	Result
2008	#15	First Round	#2 Tennessee	L 57–72
2009	#14	First Round	#3 Villanova	L 67–80
2014	#15	First Round	#2 Wisconsin	L 35–75
2025	#16	First Four	#16 Mount St. Mary's	L 72–83

==== 2007–08 season ====
In 2008, the Eagles earned their first ever bid to the NCAA Division I tournament by defeating Colgate in the final round of the Patriot League tournament. The Eagles were seeded 15th against #2 Tennessee. American held tight against the Volunteers most of the game, but Tennessee pulled away to win 72–57.

==== 2008–09 season ====
In 2009, the Eagles would again earn entry to the NCAA Division I tournament by defeating Holy Cross 73–57 to win the Patriot League tournament for a second consecutive year. They were seeded 14th and faced off against #3 Villanova. The Eagles held a lead for most of the game and led by 10 points at halftime, but eventually lost 80–67 after a significant Wildcats comeback.

==== 2013–14 season ====
American earned the Patriot League's automatic berth to the NCAA men's basketball tournament with a 55–36 win over Boston University on Wed., March 12 at Agganis Arena in Boston, Mass in the Patriot League tournament final.

In their first season under coach Mike Brennan, the second-seeded Eagles led from start to finish in the decisive victory while holding the top-seeded Terriers to the lowest point total in Patriot League Championship game history. American point guard Darius Gardner scored 18 points on 7-of-9 shooting and was named Tournament MVP.

The Eagles advanced to the NCAA tournament for the first time since winning their second of back-to-back titles in 2009. They played Wisconsin and lost 75–35

=== NCAA Division II Tournament results ===
The Eagles have appeared in the NCAA Division II tournament three times. Their combined record is 6–3.

Year	Round	Opponent	Result
1958	Regional semifinals Regional Finals; Elite Eight	Buffalo; Wagner; Evansville	W 77–60; W 72–65; L 72–82
1959	Regional semifinals Regional Finals; Elite Eight	Adelphi; Hofstra; North Carolina A&T	W 80–73; W 66–65; L 70–87
1960	Regional semifinals Regional Finals; Elite Eight	Upsala; Fairfield; Evansville	W 83–74; W 75–74; L 91–101

=== NAIA Tournament results ===
The Eagles have appeared in the NAIA tournament two times. Their combined record is 0–2.

Year	Round	Opponent	Result
1950	First round	Pepperdine	L 53–54
1951	First round	Baldwin–Wallace	L 66–67

=== NIT results ===
The Eagles have appeared in the National Invitation Tournament (NIT) three times. Their combined record is 0–3.

Year	Round	Opponent	Result
1973	First round	Louisville	L 84–97
1981	First round	Toledo	L 83–91
1982	First round	Bradley	L 65–76

=== CIT results ===
The Eagles have appeared in the CollegeInsider.com Postseason Tournament (CIT) one time. Their record is 0–1.

Year	Round	Opponent	Result
2012	First round	Buffalo	L 61–78

== See also ==
- American Eagles women's basketball
