= Bender Arena =

Multi-purpose arena in Washington, D.C.

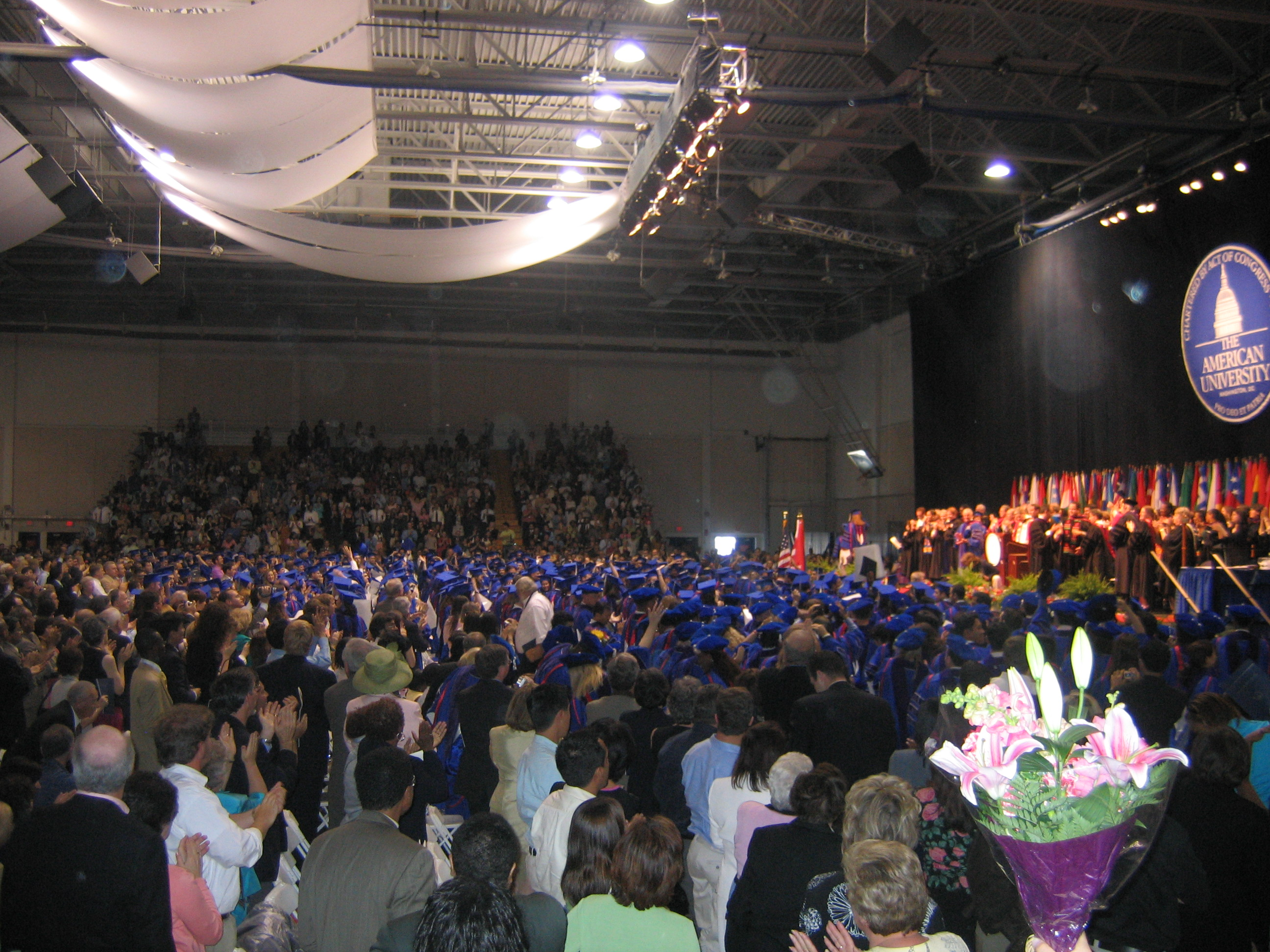
- Washington College of Law's graduation ceremony in the arena in May 2005
- Interactive map of Bender Arena
- Location: 4400 Massachusetts Ave. NW; Washington, D.C., U.S.
- Coordinates: 38°56′16″N 77°5′24″W
- Owner: American University
- Operator: American University
- Capacity: Basketball and volleyball: 4,500; Concerts: 6,000
- Surface: Hardwood

Construction
- Groundbreaking: 1985
- Opened: January 23, 1988
- Renovated: 1998
- Cost: $20 million ($54.4 million in 2025 dollars)
- Architects: Daniel F. Tulley and Associates

Tenant
- American Eagles basketball

Bender Arena is a 4,500-seat multi-purpose arena in Washington, D.C. The arena opened in 1988. It is home to the men's and women's basketball teams at American University. It is the former home to the volleyball, and wrestling teams before both moved to the Meltzer Center in 2026.

The arena, named for Washington, D.C.–based philanthropists, Howard and Sondra Bender, is also the primary campus venue for concerts, commencement, and speakers, seating up to 6,000.

The arena's main court is named for the late former American University athletic director and coach Stafford H. "Pop" Cassell, another AU alum. Bender Arena's current main scoreboard, installed prior to the 2001–02 season, includes a 7-by-9-foot (2.1 by 2.7 m) animation and video display and advertising signage for corporate sponsors. At the same time new chairback seating for the west bleachers was installed and new back-lit scorers tables surrounding the playing surface were added.

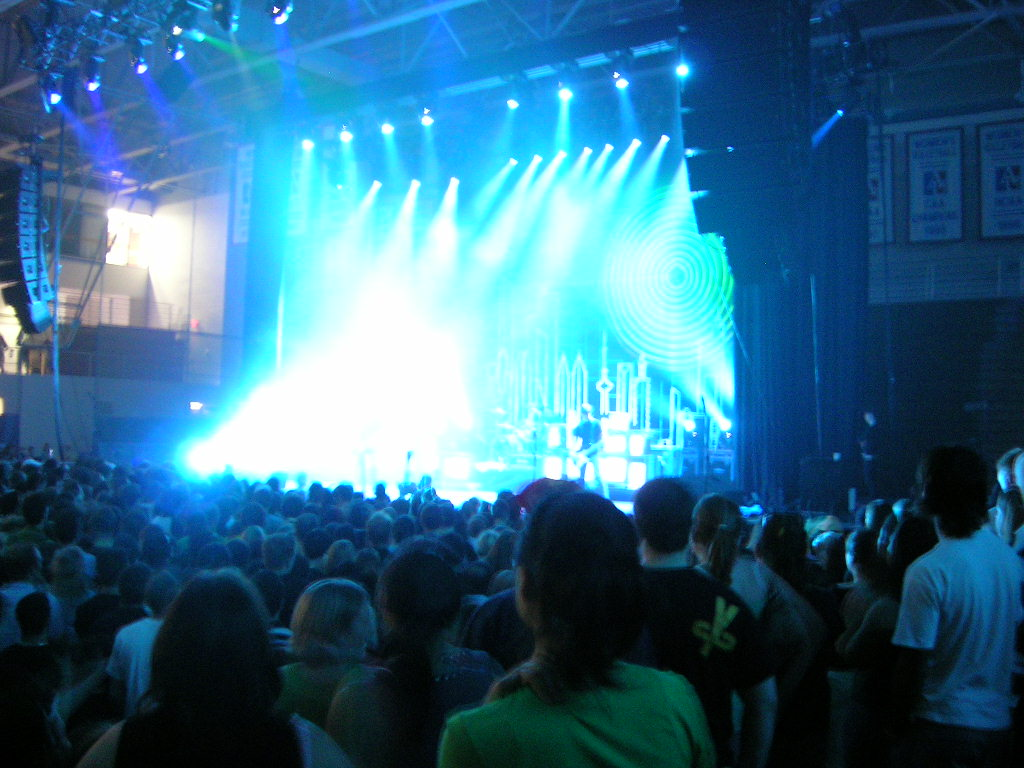
Bender Arena has a 6,000 person capacity for concerts.

Bender Arena is the flagship facility of the American University Sports Center, which also includes a fitness center, the Reeves Aquatic Center, the campus store, and a 470-car, seven-level parking garage.

The 300,000-square-foot (28,000 m^{2}) building is adjacent to the Mary Graydon Center, a design intended to increase campus interaction. AU students are able to go to class, have dinner, attend a game or concert and stop by the Tavern or The Eagles Nest convenience store for refreshments without ever leaving the confines of the building. In addition, the facility houses the athletics department and health and fitness offices. Both buildings virtually mark the geographic center of the American University campus.

Bender hosted the 2002, 2008, 2009, and 2025 Patriot League men's basketball tournament final and 2012 National Wrestling Coaches Association All-Star Classic as well as the 2026 Eastern Intercollegiate Wrestling Association Championship. The American University gymnastics club team uses the wrestling room in the fitness center. The arena has also played host to many concerts, including Pearl Jam in November 1991 opening for the Red Hot Chili Peppers and Phish, who played Bender Arena during their New Year's run in 1993.

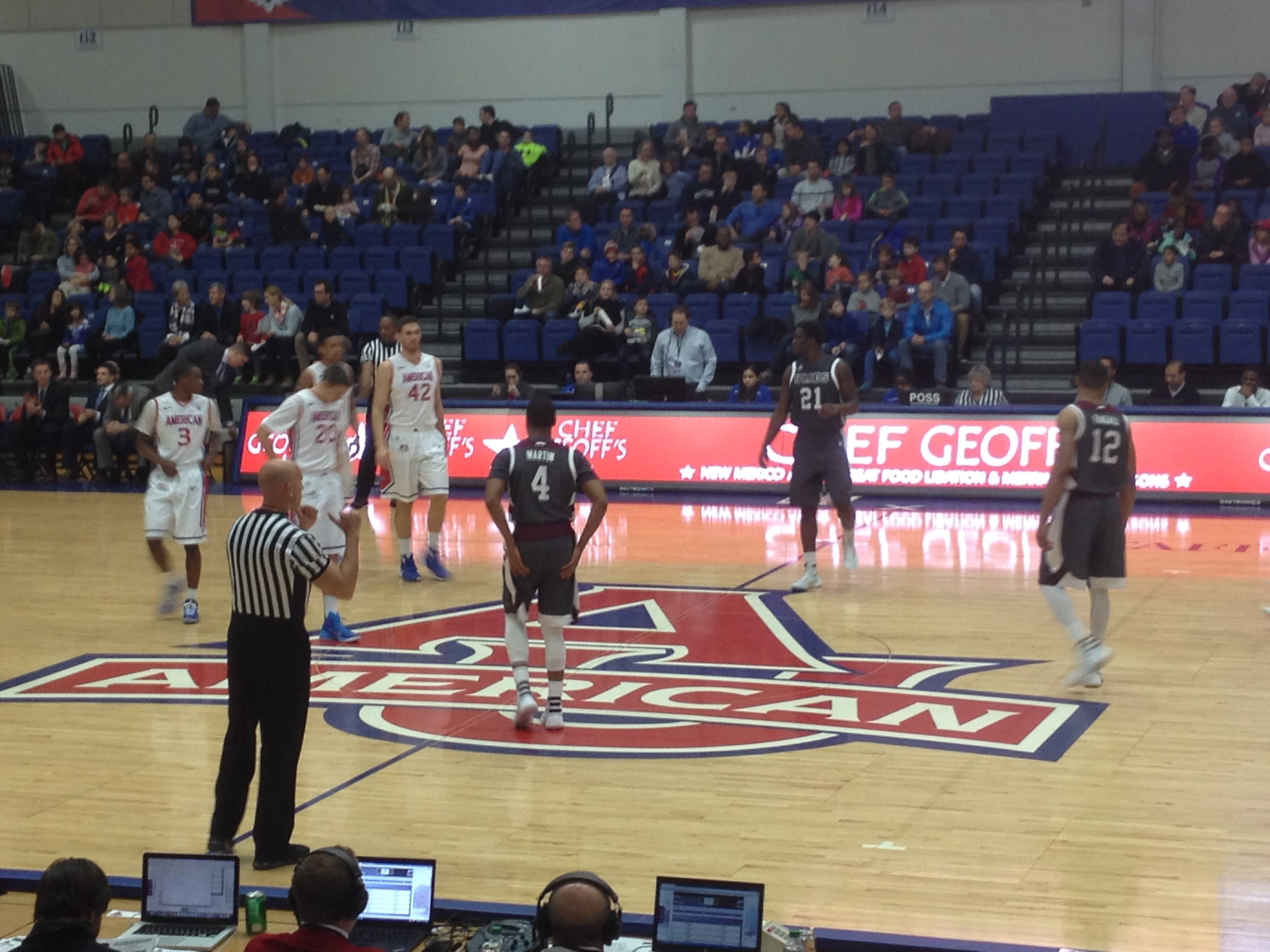
Bender Arena, configured for basketball.

== See also ==
- List of NCAA Division I basketball arenas
