= 2013–14 Vermont Catamounts men's basketball team =

American college basketball season

2013–14 Vermont Catamounts men's basketball

America East regular season champions

NIT First round vs. Georgia, L 56–63
- Conference: America East Conference
- Record: 22–11 (15–1 America East)
- Head coach: John Becker (3rd season)
- Assistant coaches: Chris Markwood; Matt O'Brien; Kyle Cieplicki
- Home arena: Patrick Gym

2013–14 America East Conference men's basketball standings
	Conf.				Overall
Team	W		L	PCT	W		L	PCT
Vermont	15	–	1	.938	22	–	11	.667
Stony Brook	13	–	3	.813	23	–	11	.676
Hartford	10	–	6	.625	17	–	16	.515
Albany †	9	–	7	.563	19	–	15	.559
UMass Lowell*	8	–	8	.500	10	–	18	.357
UMBC	5	–	11	.313	9	–	21	.300
Binghamton	4	–	12	.250	7	–	23	.233
Maine	4	–	12	.250	6	–	23	.207
New Hampshire	4	–	12	.250	6	–	24	.200
† 2014 America East tournament winner Rankings from AP poll *ineligible for postseason play due to Div. I transition

The 2013–14 Vermont Catamounts men's basketball team represented the University of Vermont during the 2013–14 NCAA Division I men's basketball season. The Catamounts, led by third year head coach John Becker, played their home games at Patrick Gym and were members of the America East Conference. They finished the season 22–11, 15–1 in America East play to win the America East regular season championship. They advanced to the semifinals of the America East Conference tournament where they lost to Albany. As a regular season conference champion who failed to win their conference tournament, the received an automatic bid to the National Invitation Tournament where they lost in the first round to Georgia.

== Roster ==
2013–14 Vermont Catamounts men's basketball team
Players
Coaches

Pos.	#	Name	Height	Weight	Year	Previous school	Hometown
F	1	Brian Voelkel	6 ft 6 in (1.98 m)	210 lb (95 kg)	Sr	Iona Prep	Pleasantville, New York
F	2	Luke Apfeld	6 ft 7 in (2.01 m)	215 lb (98 kg)	Sr	Brewster Academy	Chattanooga, Tennessee
F/C	3	Ryan Pierson	6 ft 10 in (2.08 m)	240 lb (109 kg)	RS Jr	Christian Brothers (Northeastern)	St. Louis, Missouri
G	4	Naasir Williams (W)	5 ft 9 in (1.75 m)	165 lb (75 kg)	Fr	Millbrook School	Harlem, New York
F	5	Hector Harold	6 ft 7 in (2.01 m)	205 lb (93 kg)	RS Jr	Northfield Mount Hermon (Pepperdine)	Pasadena, California
G	12	Sandro Carissimo	6 ft 2 in (1.88 m)	170 lb (77 kg)	Sr	Iona Prep	Sleepy Hollow, New York
G	14	Josh Elbaum	6 ft 3 in (1.91 m)	195 lb (88 kg)	Sr	St. John the Baptist/ Northfield Mount Hermon	Melville, New York
G/F	15	Brendan Kilpatrick (redshirt)	6 ft 5 in (1.96 m)	205 lb (93 kg)	So	Malvern Prep	Norristown, Pennsylvania
G	20	Dre Wills	6 ft 1 in (1.85 m)	175 lb (79 kg)	Fr	Mercersburg (PA) Academy	Indianapolis, Indiana
G	21	Candon Rusin	6 ft 4 in (1.93 m)	190 lb (86 kg)	Sr	Twin Valley/Topsail (Marist)	Wilmington, Vermont
G/F	24	Harrison Taggart	6 ft 5 in (1.96 m)	190 lb (86 kg)	RS Fr	Mill River/St. Paul's	Wallingford, Vermont
F	31	Clancy Rugg	6 ft 8 in (2.03 m)	195 lb (88 kg)	Sr	Burlington/Northfield Mount Hermon	Burlington, Vermont
F	32	Ethan O'Day	6 ft 9 in (2.06 m)	205 lb (93 kg)	So	E. O. Smith/Northfield Mount Hermon	Mansfield, Connecticut
F	34	Kurt Steidl	6 ft 6 in (1.98 m)	185 lb (84 kg)	Fr	Ridgefield	Ridgefield, Connecticut

Head coach

- John Becker

Assistant coach(es)

- Chris Markwood
- Matt O'Brien
- Kyle Cieplicki

Legend

- (C) Team captain
- (S) Suspended
- (I) Ineligible
- (W) Walk-on
- Injured
- Current redshirt

Roster
Last update: November 4, 2013

== Schedule ==
Date time, TV	Rank^{#}	Opponent^{#}	Result	Record	Site (attendance) city, state
Exhibition
10/26/2013*; 7:00 pm		Saint Michael's	W 79–72		Patrick Gym (2,057); Burlington, VT
11/03/2013*; 2:00 pm		Concordia (Quebec)	W 86–49		Patrick Gym (1,810); Burlington, VT
Regular season
11/09/2013*; 7:00 pm		Saint Joseph's	L 64–74	0–1	Patrick Gym (2,698); Burlington, VT
11/12/2013*; 7:00 pm		Siena	W 77–66	1–1	Patrick Gym (2,212); Burlington, VT
11/16/2013*; 7:00 pm		at Bryant	L 64–87	1–2	Chace Athletic Center (N/A); Smithfield, RI
11/18/2013*; 7:00 pm, FS1		at Providence	L 49–70	1–3	Dunkin' Donuts Center (5,021); Providence, RI
11/21/2013*; 7:00 pm		at Wagner	L 61–68	1–4	Spiro Sports Center (1,810); Staten Island, NY
11/24/2013*; 6:30 pm, ESPNU		at No. 6 Duke	L 90–91	1–5	Cameron Indoor Stadium (9,314); Durham, NC
11/27/2013*; 11:15 pm		vs. Illinois State; Golden Gate Challenge	W 87–76	2–5	War Memorial Gymnasium (697); San Francisco, CA
11/29/2013*; 9:00 pm		at San Francisco; Golden Gate Challenge	L 61–72	2–6	War Memorial Gymnasium (1,178); San Francisco, CA
11/30/2013*; 9:00 pm		vs. Sonoma State; Golden Gate Challenge	W 73–61	3–6	War Memorial Gymnasium (325); San Francisco, CA
12/15/2013*; 2:00 pm		Quinnipiac	L 67–80	3–7	Patrick Gym (2,018); Burlington, VT
12/18/2013; 7:00 pm		at UMass Lowell	W 62–48	3–8 (1–0)	Costello Athletic Center (429); Lowell, MA
12/21/2013*; 4:00 pm		at Harvard	L 68–74	4–8	Lavietes Pavilion (2,195); Cambridge, MA
12/30/2013*; 7:00 pm		Lyndon State	W 88–48	5–8	Patrick Gym (2,078); Burlington, VT
01/04/2014*; 7:00 pm		at Dartmouth	W 62–53	6–8	Leede Arena (1,407); Hanover, NH
01/08/2014*; 7:00 pm		at Yale	W 67–59	7–8	Payne Whitney Gymnasium (652); New Haven, CT
01/11/2014; 7:00 pm		Albany	W 68–38	8–8 (2–0)	Patrick Gym (2,583); Burlington, VT
01/16/2014; 7:00 pm		at Maine	W 83–46	9–8 (3–0)	Cross Insurance Center (1,116); Bangor, ME
01/18/2014; 2:00 pm		at UMBC	W 73–47	10–8 (4–0)	Retriever Activities Center (1,145); Catonsville, MD
01/20/2014; 7:00 pm		New Hampshire	W 57–40	11–8 (5–0)	Patrick Gym (2,234); Burlington, VT
01/24/2014; 9:00 pm, ESPNU		at Stony Brook	L 64–67	11–9 (5–1)	Pritchard Gymnasium (1,630); Stony Brook, NY
01/26/2014; 7:00 pm		Binghamton	W 72–39	12–9 (6–1)	Patrick Gym (2,150); Burlington, VT
01/29/2014; 7:00 pm, ESPN3		at Hartford	W 67–60	13–9 (7–1)	Chase Arena at Reich Family Pavilion (2,010); Hartford, CT
02/01/2014; 7:30 pm, ESPN3		at Albany	W 55–45	14–9 (8–1)	SEFCU Arena (4,538); Albany, NY
02/04/2014; 7:00 pm		Maine	W 93–65	15–9 (9–1)	Patrick Gym (2,106); Burlington, VT
02/12/2014; 7:00 pm		UMass Lowell	W 83–58	16–9 (10–1)	Patrick Gym (2,068); Burlington, VT
02/15/2014; 2:00 pm		UMBC	W 76–52	17–9 (11–1)	Patrick Gym (2,531); Burlington, VT
02/19/2014; 7:00 pm		at New Hampshire	W 79–44	18–9 (12–1)	Lundholm Gym (589); Durham, NH
02/23/2014; 2:00 pm, ESPN3		Hartford	W 72–47	19–9 (13–1)	Patrick Gym (2,602); Burlington, VT
02/27/2014; 7:00 pm, ESPN3		Stony Brook	W 69–53	20–9 (14–1)	Patrick Gym (3,266); Burlington, VT
03/02/2014; 2:00 pm		at Binghamton	W 92–83 ^{OT}	21–9 (15–1)	Binghamton University Events Center (2,907); Vestal, NY
America East tournament
03/08/2014; 12:00 pm, ESPN3	(1)	vs. (8) New Hampshire; Quarterfinals	W 77–60	22–9	SEFCU Arena (N/A); Albany, NY
03/09/2014; 5:00 pm, ESPN3	(1)	vs. (4) Albany; Semifinals	L 58–67	22–10	SEFCU Arena (2,724); Albany, NY
NIT
03/19/2014*; 8:00 pm, ESPNU	(7)	at (2) Georgia; First round	L 56–63	22–11	Stegeman Coliseum (3,951); Athens, GA
*Non-conference game. ^{#}Rankings from AP Poll. (#) Tournament seedings in parentheses. All times are in Eastern Time. (#) during NIT is Seed within Region.
