= 2013–14 UMass Lowell River Hawks men's basketball team =

American college basketball season

2013–14 UMass Lowell River Hawks men's basketball
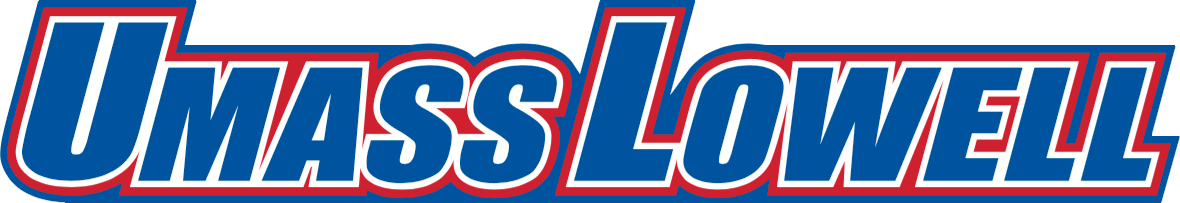
- Conference: America East Conference
- Record: 10–18 (8–8 America East)
- Head coach: Pat Duquette (1st season)
- Assistant coaches: Michael Harding; Biko Paris; Nick Leonardelli
- Home arena: Costello Athletic Center; Tsongas Center at UMass Lowell

2013–14 America East Conference men's basketball standings
	Conf.				Overall
Team	W		L	PCT	W		L	PCT
Vermont	15	–	1	.938	22	–	11	.667
Stony Brook	13	–	3	.813	23	–	11	.676
Hartford	10	–	6	.625	17	–	16	.515
Albany †	9	–	7	.563	19	–	15	.559
UMass Lowell*	8	–	8	.500	10	–	18	.357
UMBC	5	–	11	.313	9	–	21	.300
Binghamton	4	–	12	.250	7	–	23	.233
Maine	4	–	12	.250	6	–	23	.207
New Hampshire	4	–	12	.250	6	–	24	.200
† 2014 America East tournament winner Rankings from AP poll *ineligible for postseason play due to Div. I transition

The 2013–14 UMass Lowell River Hawks men's basketball team represented the University of Massachusetts Lowell during the 2013–14 NCAA Division I men's basketball season. This was the River Hawks first year in Division I. They were coached by first year head coach Pat Duquette and played most of their home games at Costello Athletic Center. Three games were played at the Tsongas Center at UMass Lowell for the 2013-2014 season. They are members of the America East Conference. They finished the season 10–18, 8–8 in American East play to finish in fifth place. As part of their transition to Division I, they are ineligible for post season play until the 2017–18 season.

== Roster ==
2013–14 UMass Lowell River Hawks men's basketball team
Players
Coaches

Pos.	#	Name	Height	Weight	Year	Hometown
G	1	Michael Gelineau	6 ft 2 in (1.88 m)	175 lb (79 kg)	Fr	Waltham, Massachusetts
G	4	Chad Holley	5 ft 10 in (1.78 m)	170 lb (77 kg)	Jr	New York, New York
G	5	Carlos Taylor	6 ft 2 in (1.88 m)	185 lb (84 kg)	So	Philadelphia, Pennsylvania
G	10	Jahad Thomas	6 ft 2 in (1.88 m)	220 lb (100 kg)	Fr	Williamsport, Pennsylvania
G	11	Akeem Williams	5 ft 10 in (1.78 m)	190 lb (86 kg)	Sr	Brockton, Massachusetts
G	13	Andrew Nene	5 ft 11 in (1.8 m)	164 lb (74 kg)	Fr	Webster, Massachusetts
G	21	DJ Mlachnik	6 ft 2 in (1.88 m)	175 lb (79 kg)	So	Muskego, Wisconsin
G	22	Antonio Bivins	6 ft 5 in (1.96 m)	175 lb (79 kg)	Sr	Miami, Florida
G	23	Kerry Weldon	6 ft 5 in (1.96 m)	190 lb (86 kg)	Sr	New York, New York
F	24	Tyler Livingston	6 ft 5 in (1.96 m)	200 lb (91 kg)	Fr	Hudson, New Hampshire
G	30	Mark Cornelius	6 ft 2 in (1.88 m)	180 lb (82 kg)	So	Westford, Massachusetts
F	34	Kennedy Chukwuocha	6 ft 6 in (1.98 m)	205 lb (93 kg)	So	Willingboro, New Jersey
F	42	Parris Massey	6 ft 7 in (2.01 m)	220 lb (100 kg)	Sr	Boston, Massachusetts
C	50	James McDonnell	6 ft 10 in (2.08 m)	217 lb (98 kg)	So	Swansea, Massachusetts

Head coach

- Pat Duquette

Assistant coach(es)

- Michael Harding
- Biko Paris
- Nick Leonardelli

Legend

- (C) Team captain
- (S) Suspended
- (I) Ineligible
- (W) Walk-on
- Injured
- Current redshirt

Roster
Last update: October 16, 2013

== Schedule ==
Date time, TV	Opponent	Result	Record	Site (attendance) city, state
Regular Season
11/08/2013*; 7:00 pm	at No. 7 Michigan	L 42–69	0–1	Crisler Center (12,707); Ann Arbor, MI
11/13/2013*; 7:00 pm	at Boston	L 65–91	0–2	Case Gym (638); Boston, MA
11/16/2013*; 4:00 pm	at Dartmouth	L 59–77	0–3	Leede Arena (713); Hanover, NH
11/19/2013*; 7:00 pm	Brown	L 76–87	0–4	Costello Athletic Center (852); Lowell, MA
11/23/2013*; 2:00 pm	at Rhode Island	L 68–79	0–5	Ryan Center (N/A); Kingston, RI
11/26/2013*; 2:00 pm	at Cincinnati	L 49–79	0–6	Fifth Third Arena (5,477); Cincinnati, OH
12/01/2013*; 2:00 pm	Mount Ida	W 73–45	1–6	Costello Athletic Center (N/A); Lowell, MA
12/03/2013*; 7:00 pm	at St. Bonaventure	L 58–67	1–7	Reilly Center (2,860); Olean, NY
12/07/2013*; 2:00 pm	at NJIT	L 44–55	1–8	Fleisher Center (517); Newark, NJ
12/09/2013*; 7:00 pm	at Columbia	L 39–78	1–9	Levien Gymnasium (542); New York, NY
12/18/2013; 7:00 pm	Vermont	L 48–62	1–10 (0–1)	Costello Athletic Center (429); Lowell, MA
12/21/2013*; 2:00 pm	Duquesne	L 77–95	1–11	Tsongas Center (1,758); Lowell, MA
01/05/2013; 1:00 pm	UMBC	W 59–54	2–11 (1–1)	Costello Athletic Center (307); Lowell, MA
01/11/2014; 4:30 pm	at Binghamton	W 71–59	3–11 (2–1)	Binghamton University Events Center (2,835); Vestal, NY
01/15/2014; 7:00 pm	Albany	W 70–66 ^{OT}	4–11 (3–1)	Costello Athletic Center (243); Lowell, MA
01/18/2014; 3:30 pm	at Stony Brook	L 65–70	4–12 (3–2)	Pritchard Gymnasium (1,630); Stony Brook, NY
01/20/2014; 1:00 pm	at Hartford	L 51–69	4–13 (3–3)	Chase Arena at Reich Family Pavilion (2,772); West Hartford, CT
01/23/2014; 7:00 pm	Maine	W 74–62	5–13 (4–3)	Cross Insurance Center (1,157); Bangor, ME
01/26/2014; 2:00 pm, ESPN3	New Hampshire	L 32–61	5–14 (4–4)	Tsongas Center (3,717); Lowell, MA
02/01/2014; 2:00 pm	Binghamton	W 62–55	6–14 (5–4)	Costello Athletic Center (349); Lowell, MA
02/03/2014*; 7:00 pm	NJIT	W 73–64	7–14	Costello Athletic Center (241); Lowell, MA
02/05/2014; 7:00 pm	at Albany	L 56–73	7–15 (5–5)	SEFCU Arena (1,435); Albany, NY
02/08/2014; 7:00 pm	UMBC	W 71–61	8–15 (6–5)	Retriever Activities Center (1,016); Catonsville, MD
02/12/2014; 7:00 pm	at Vermont	L 58–83	8–16 (6–6)	Patrick Gym (2,068); Burlington, VT
02/15/2014; 2:00 pm	Stony Brook	L 68–78	8–17 (6–7)	Tsongas Center (1,676); Lowell, MA
02/19/2014; 7:00 pm	Hartford	L 68–75	8–18 (6–8)	Costello Athletic Center (271); Lowell, MA
02/22/2014; 3:30 pm	New Hampshire	W 58–52	9–18 (7–8)	Lundholm Gym (896); Durham, NH
02/27/2014; 7:00 pm	Maine	W 84–72	10–18 (8–8)	Costello Athletic Center (646); Lowell, MA
*Non-conference game. ^{#}Rankings from AP Poll. (#) Tournament seedings in parentheses. All times are in Eastern Time..
