= 2013–14 Hartford Hawks men's basketball team =

American college basketball season

2013–14 Hartford Hawks men's basketball
- Conference: America East Conference
- Record: 17–16 (10–6 America East)
- Head coach: John Gallagher (4th season)
- Assistant coaches: Chris Gerlufsen; Matt Blue; Bill Dooley
- Home arena: Chase Arena at Reich Family Pavilion

2013–14 America East Conference men's basketball standings
| | Conf. | | | | Overall |
| Team | W | | L | PCT | W | | L | PCT |
|---|---|---|---|---|---|---|---|---|
| Vermont | 15 | – | 1 | .938 | 22 | – | 11 | .667 |
| Stony Brook | 13 | – | 3 | .813 | 23 | – | 11 | .676 |
| Hartford | 10 | – | 6 | .625 | 17 | – | 16 | .515 |
| Albany † | 9 | – | 7 | .563 | 19 | – | 15 | .559 |
| UMass Lowell* | 8 | – | 8 | .500 | 10 | – | 18 | .357 |
| UMBC | 5 | – | 11 | .313 | 9 | – | 21 | .300 |
| Binghamton | 4 | – | 12 | .250 | 7 | – | 23 | .233 |
| Maine | 4 | – | 12 | .250 | 6 | – | 23 | .207 |
| New Hampshire | 4 | – | 12 | .250 | 6 | – | 24 | .200 |
† 2014 America East tournament winner Rankings from AP poll *ineligible for postseason play due to Div. I transition

The 2013–14 Hartford Hawks men's basketball team represented the University of Hartford during the 2013–14 NCAA Division I men's basketball season. The Hawks, led by fourth year head coach John Gallagher, played their home games at the Chase Arena at Reich Family Pavilion and were members of the America East Conference. They finished the season 17–16, 10–6 in America East play to finish in third place. They advanced to the semifinals of the America East Conference tournament where they lost to Stony Brook.

== Roster ==
2013–14 Hartford Hawks men's basketball team
Players
Coaches

| Pos. | # | Name | Height | Weight | Year | Previous school | Hometown |
|---|---|---|---|---|---|---|---|
| G | 00 | Wes Cole | 6 ft 0 in (1.83 m) | 165 lb (75 kg) | Jr | The Woodlands | The Woodlands, Texas |
| F | 1 | Mark Nwakamma | 6 ft 6 in (1.98 m) | 235 lb (107 kg) | Jr | Leander | Leander, Texas |
| G | 2 | Justin Graham | 6 ft 1 in (1.85 m) | 175 lb (79 kg) | Fr | Brandeis | San Antonio, Texas |
| G | 3 | Jeremiah Aska | 5 ft 8 in (1.73 m) | 165 lb (75 kg) | Sr | St. Raymond's | The Bronx, New York |
| G | 4 | Corban Wroe | 6 ft 2 in (1.88 m) | 195 lb (88 kg) | Jr | Australian Institute of Sport | Townsville, Queensland, Australia |
| G | 11 | Taylor Dyson | 6 ft 4 in (1.93 m) | 185 lb (84 kg) | So | Box Hill Senior Secondary | Sassafras, Victoria, Australia |
| C | 14 | Dougal Weir | 6 ft 9 in (2.06 m) | 240 lb (109 kg) | Fr | Sydney Church of England | Sydney, New South Wales, Australia |
| G | 15 | Yolonzo Moore II | 6 ft 2 in (1.88 m) | 175 lb (79 kg) | Jr | Akins | Austin, Texas |
| G | 22 | Evan Cooper | 6 ft 0 in (1.83 m) | 185 lb (84 kg) | So | The Woodlands College Park | Houston, Texas |
| F | 33 | Adam Oresky | 6 ft 8 in (2.03 m) | 205 lb (93 kg) | Sr | Princeton Day School | Lawrenceville, New Jersey |
| F | 43 | Nate Sikma | 6 ft 7 in (2.01 m) | 235 lb (107 kg) | Jr | Bellevue | Bellevue, Washington |
| F | 44 | Oren Faulk | 6 ft 7 in (2.01 m) | 250 lb (113 kg) | Sr | Muskogee | Muskogee, Oklahoma |
| F/C | 50 | Jamie Schneck | 6 ft 8 in (2.03 m) | 240 lb (109 kg) | Jr | Whitefish Bay | Whitefish Bay, Wisconsin |

Head coach

- John Gallagher (Saint Joseph's)

Assistant coach(es)

- Chris Gerlufsen (Randolph–Macon)
- Matt Blue
- Bill Dooley (Richmond)

Legend

- (C) Team captain
- (S) Suspended
- (I) Ineligible
- (W) Walk-on
- Injured
- Current redshirt

Roster
Last update: April 28, 2020

== Schedule ==
| Date time, TV | Rank^{#} | Opponent^{#} | Result | Record | Site (attendance) city, state |
Non-conference regular season
| 11/09/2013*; 3:00 pm | | vs. Quinnipiac; Connecticut 6 Classic | L 77–82 | 0–1 | Webster Bank Arena (5,060); Bridgeport, CT |
| 11/12/2013*; 7:00 am, ESPN2 | | at Florida Gulf Coast; ESPN College Tip-Off Marathon | L 51–65 | 0–2 | Alico Arena (4,525); Fort Myers, FL |
| 11/13/2013*; 7:00 pm | | at Fairfield; Hall of Fame Tip Off | W 63–53 | 1–2 | Webster Bank Arena (1,309); Fairfield, CT |
| 11/15/2013*; 7:00 pm | | Fairleigh Dickinson | W 74–60 | 2–2 | Chase Arena at Reich Family Pavilion (1,747); West Hartford, CT |
| 11/19/2013*; 7:00 pm, ESPN3 | | at No. 3 Louisville; Hall of Fame Tip Off | L 48–87 | 2–3 | KFC Yum! Center (20,226); Louisville, KY |
| 11/23/2013*; 5:30 pm | | vs. Hofstra; Hall of Fame Tip Off | L 78–81 | 2–4 | Mohegan Sun Arena (2,073); Uncasville, CT |
| 11/24/2013*; 6:00 pm | | vs. Holy Cross; Hall of Fame Tip Off | L 55–80 | 2–5 | Mohegan Sun Arena (1,506); Uncasville, CT |
| 11/30/2013*; 4:00 pm | | Yale | L 49–54 | 2–6 | Chase Arena at Reich Family Pavilion (1,318); West Hartford, CT |
| 12/04/2013*; 7:00 pm | | at La Salle | L 62–75 | 2–7 | Tom Gola Arena (1,611); Philadelphia, PA |
| 12/07/2013*; 7:00 pm | | Holy Cross | W 90–78 | 3–7 | Chase Arena at Reich Family Pavilion (1,590); West Hartford, CT |
| 12/10/2013*; 7:00 pm | | at Central Connecticut; Rivalry | L 59–73 | 3–8 | William H. Detrick Gymnasium (1,654); New Britain, CT |
| 12/15/2013*; 2:00 pm | | at Sacred Heart | W 84–72 | 4–8 | William H. Pitt Center (249); Fairfield, CT |
| 12/22/2013*; 2:00 pm | | Saint Peter's | W 66–56 | 5–8 | Chase Arena at Reich Family Pavilion (1,278); West Hartford, CT |
| 12/29/2013*; 9:00 pm, P12N | | at Washington | L 67–73 | 5–9 | Alaska Airlines Arena at Hec Edmundson Pavilion (6,617); Seattle, WA |
| 01/04/2014; 7:00 pm | | at Albany | L 56–81 | 5–10 (0–1) | SEFCU Arena (2,556); Albany, NY |
| 01/07/2014*; 7:00 pm | | at Dartmouth | W 68–56 | 6–10 | Leede Arena (523); Hanover, NH |
| 01/09/2014; 7:00 pm | | Maine | W 80–65 | 7–10 (1–1) | Chase Arena at Reich Family Pavilion (892); West Hartford, CT |
| 01/12/2014; 2:30 pm, ESPN3 | | Stony Brook | L 50–73 | 7–11 (1–2) | Chase Arena at Reich Family Pavilion (2,992); West Hartford, CT |
| 01/18/2014; 1:00 pm, FCS | | at New Hampshire | W 60–43 | 8–11 (2–2) | Lundholm Gym (377); Durham, NH |
| 01/20/2014; 1:00 pm | | UMass Lowell | W 69–51 | 9–11 (3–2) | Chase Arena at Reich Family Pavilion (2,772); West Hartford, CT |
| 01/23/2014; 7:00 pm | | at Binghamton | W 56–54 | 10–11 (4–2) | Binghamton University Events Center (1,858); Vestal, NY |
| 01/25/2014; 3:30 pm | | at UMBC | L 58–60 | 10–12 (4–3) | Retriever Activities Center (1,387); Catonsville, MD |
| 01/29/2014; 7:00 pm, ESPN3 | | Vermont | L 60–67 | 10–13 (4–4) | Chase Arena at Reich Family Pavilion (2,010); West Hartford, CT |
| 02/01/2014; 2:00 pm | | at Stony Brook | W 56–52 | 10–14 (4–5) | Pritchard Gymnasium (1,630); Stony Brook, NY |
| 02/08/2014; 7:00 pm | | Albany | W 67–54 | 11–14 (5–5) | Chase Arena at Reich Family Pavilion (2,230); West Hartford, CT |
| 02/12/2014; 7:00 pm | | at Maine | W 92–79 | 12–14 (6–5) | Alfond Arena (1,082); Orono, ME |
| 02/15/2014; 7:00 pm | | New Hampshire | W 61–59 | 13–14 (7–5) | Chase Arena at Reich Family Pavilion (1,600); West Hartford, CT |
| 02/19/2014; 7:00 pm | | at UMass Lowell | W 75–68 | 14–14 (8–5) | Costello Athletic Center (271); Lowell, MA |
| 02/23/2014; 2:00 pm, ESPN3 | | at Vermont | L 47–72 | 14–15 (8–6) | Patrick Gym (2,602); Burlington, VT |
| 02/27/2014; 7:00 pm | | Binghamton | W 89–83 ^{OT} | 15–15 (9–6) | Chase Arena at Reich Family Pavilion (1,847); West Hartford, CT |
| 03/02/2014; 2:00 pm | | UMBC | W 67–56 | 16–15 (10–6) | Chase Arena at Reich Family Pavilion (1,679); West Hartford, CT |
America East Men's tournament
| 03/08/2014; 8:30 pm, ESPN3 | | vs. Binghamton; Quarterfinals | W 69–42 | 17–15 | SEFCU Arena (N/A); Albany, NY |
| 03/09/2014; 7:45 pm, ESPN3 | | vs. Stony Brook; Semifinals | L 64–69 | 17–16 | SEFCU Arena (2,724); Albany, NY |
*Non-conference game. ^{#}Rankings from AP Poll. (#) Tournament seedings in parentheses. All times are in Eastern Time.
