= 2013–14 New Hampshire Wildcats men's basketball team =

American college basketball season

2013–14 New Hampshire Wildcats men's basketball
- Conference: America East Conference
- Record: 6–24 (4–12 America East)
- Head coach: Bill Herrion (9th season)
- Assistant coaches: Kenneth Dempsey; Chris Mohr; Marc Kuntz
- Home arena: Lundholm Gym

2013–14 America East Conference men's basketball standings
| | Conf. | | | | Overall |
| Team | W | | L | PCT | W | | L | PCT |
|---|---|---|---|---|---|---|---|---|
| Vermont | 15 | – | 1 | .938 | 22 | – | 11 | .667 |
| Stony Brook | 13 | – | 3 | .813 | 23 | – | 11 | .676 |
| Hartford | 10 | – | 6 | .625 | 17 | – | 16 | .515 |
| Albany † | 9 | – | 7 | .563 | 19 | – | 15 | .559 |
| UMass Lowell* | 8 | – | 8 | .500 | 10 | – | 18 | .357 |
| UMBC | 5 | – | 11 | .313 | 9 | – | 21 | .300 |
| Binghamton | 4 | – | 12 | .250 | 7 | – | 23 | .233 |
| Maine | 4 | – | 12 | .250 | 6 | – | 23 | .207 |
| New Hampshire | 4 | – | 12 | .250 | 6 | – | 24 | .200 |
† 2014 America East tournament winner Rankings from AP poll *ineligible for postseason play due to Div. I transition

The 2013–14 New Hampshire Wildcats men's basketball team represented the University of New Hampshire during the 2013–14 NCAA Division I men's basketball season. The Wildcats, led by ninth year head coach Bill Herrion, played their home games at Lundholm Gym and were members of the America East Conference. They finished the season 6–24, 4–12 in American East play to finish in a three way tie for seventh place.

They lost in the quarterfinals of the American East tournament to Vermont.

== Roster ==
| Number | Name | Position | Height | Weight | Year | Hometown |
|---|---|---|---|---|---|---|
| 0 | Jaleen Smith | Guard | 6–4 | 195 | Freshman | Freeport, Texas |
| 1 | Patrick Konan | Forward | 6–6 | 220 | Senior | Gainesville, Florida |
| 3 | Jacoby Armstrong | Forward | 6–7 | 230 | Freshman | Sachse, Texas |
| 5 | Jordon Bronner | Guard | 6–0 | 170 | Senior | Sleepy Hollow, New York |
| 10 | Logan Mortenson | Forward | 6–7 | 210 | Sophomore | South Jordan, Utah |
| 11 | Tommy McDonnell | Guard | 6–3 | 175 | Junior | Durham, North Carolina |
| 12 | Frank Okeke | Forward | 6–6 | 220 | Sophomore | DeSoto, Texas |
| 14 | John Edwards | Forward | 6–6 | 205 | Freshman | Charlotte, North Carolina |
| 22 | Scott Morris | Guard | 6–2 | 200 | Senior | Walkersville, Maryland |
| 23 | Matt Miller | Guard | 6–4 | 185 | Senior | Arnold, Maryland |
| 24 | Williams Gabriel | Forward | 6–8 | 215 | Freshman | Lagos, Nigeria |
| 30 | Daniel Dion | Guard | 6–0 | 175 | Freshman | Cedar Park, Texas |
| 32 | Joe Bramanti | Guard | 6–2 | 195 | Sophomore | Andover, Massachusetts |
| 44 | Chris Pelcher | Center | 6–10 | 240 | Senior | Albany, New York |

== Schedule ==
| Date time, TV | Opponent | Result | Record | Site (attendance) city, state |
Regular season
| 11/09/2013*; 7:30 pm | Suffolk | W 94–70 | 1–0 | Lundholm Gym (658); Durham, NH |
| 11/13/2013*; 7:00 pm | at Duquesne | W 84–81 | 2–0 | A. J. Palumbo Center (2,092); Pittsburgh, PA |
| 11/17/2013*; 5:00 pm | NJIT | L 63–71 | 2–1 | Lundholm Gym (634); Durham, NH |
| 11/21/2013*; 8:00 pm, CBSSN | at No. 25 Marquette | L 53–58 | 2–2 | BMO Harris Bradley Center (13,522); Milwaukee, WI |
| 11/24/2013*; 1:00 pm | Bryant | L 55–60 | 2–3 | Lundholm Gym (615); Durham, NH |
| 11/30/2013*; 1:00 pm, WBIN-TV | Holy Cross | L 52–63 | 2–4 | Lundholm Gym (308); Durham, NH |
| 12/04/2013*; 7:00 pm | at Central Connecticut | L 56–65 | 2–5 | William H. Detrick Gymnasium (1,536); New Britain, CT |
| 12/07/2013*; 4:30 pm | at Yale | L 61–71 | 2–6 | Payne Whitney Gymnasium (721); New Haven, CT |
| 12/15/2013; 1:00 pm, LWN | Stony Brook | L 48–67 | 2–7 (0–1) | Lundholm Gym (573); Durham, NH |
| 12/18/2013*; 7:00 pm | Dartmouth | L 48–62 | 2–8 | Lundholm Gym (454); Durham, NH |
| 12/22/2013*; 2:00 pm | at Rhode Island | L 45–62 | 2–9 | Ryan Center (3,246); Kingston, RI |
| 12/30/2013*; 7:30 pm | at Towson | L 64–72 | 2–10 | Tiger Arena (1,945); Towson, MD |
| 01/04/2013*; 1:00 pm | Sacred Heart | L 53–66 | 2–11 | Lundholm Gym (472); Durham, NH |
| 01/07/2014*; 7:00 pm | at Brown | L 68–72 | 2–12 | Pizzitola Sports Center (490); Providence, RI |
| 01/09/2014; 7:00 pm | at Binghamton | L 38–67 | 2–13 (0–2) | Binghamton University Events Center (1,879); Vestal, NY |
| 01/15/2014; 7:00 pm | UMBC | W 56–42 | 3–13 (1–2) | Lundholm Gym (426); Durham, NH |
| 01/18/2014; 1:00 pm | Hartford | L 43–60 | 3–14 (1–3) | Lundholm Gym (377); Durham, NH |
| 01/20/2014; 7:00 pm | at Vermont | L 40–57 | 3–15 (1–4) | Patrick Gym (2,234); Burlington, VT |
| 01/23/2014; 7:00 pm | Albany | W 60–56 | 4–15 (2–4) | Lundholm Gym (765); Durham, NH |
| 01/26/2014; 2:00 pm | at UMass Lowell | W 61–32 | 5–15 (3–4) | Tsongas Center (3,717); Lowell, MA |
| 01/29/2014; 7:00 pm | Maine | L 60–68 | 5–16 (3–5) | Lundholm Gym (N/A); Durham, NH |
| 02/05/2014; 7:00 pm | at UMBC | L 57–68 | 5–17 (3–6) | Retriever Activities Center (1,134); Catonsville, MD |
| 02/08/2014; 2:00 pm | at Stony Brook | W 73–69 | 6–17 (4–6) | Pritchard Gymnasium (1,630); Stony Brook, NY |
| 02/12/2014; 7:00 pm | Binghamton | L 71–72 ^{OT} | 6–18 (4–7) | Lundholm Gym (529); Durham, NH |
| 02/15/2014; 7:00 pm | at Hartford | L 59–61 | 6–19 (4–8) | Chase Arena at Reich Family Pavilion (1,600); Hartford, CT |
| 02/19/2014; 7:00 pm | Vermont | L 44–79 | 6–20 (4–9) | Lundholm Gym (589); Durham, NH |
| 02/22/2014; 3:30 pm | UMass Lowell | L 52–58 | 6–21 (4–10) | Lundholm Gym (896); Durham, NH |
| 02/27/2014; 7:00 pm | at Albany | L 48–66 | 6–22 (4–11) | SEFCU Arena (1,980); Albany, NY |
| 03/02/2014; 2:00 pm | at Maine | L 69–73 | 6–23 (4–12) | Cross Insurance Center (1,296); Bangor, ME |
2014 America East tournament
| 03/08/2014; 12:00 pm, ESPN3 | vs. Vermont; Quarterfinals | L 60–77 | 6–24 | SEFCU Arena (N/A); Albany, NY |
*Non-conference game. ^{#}Rankings from AP Poll. (#) Tournament seedings in parentheses. All times are in Eastern Time.
