= 2013–14 UMBC Retrievers men's basketball team =

American college basketball season

2013–14 UMBC Retrievers men's basketball
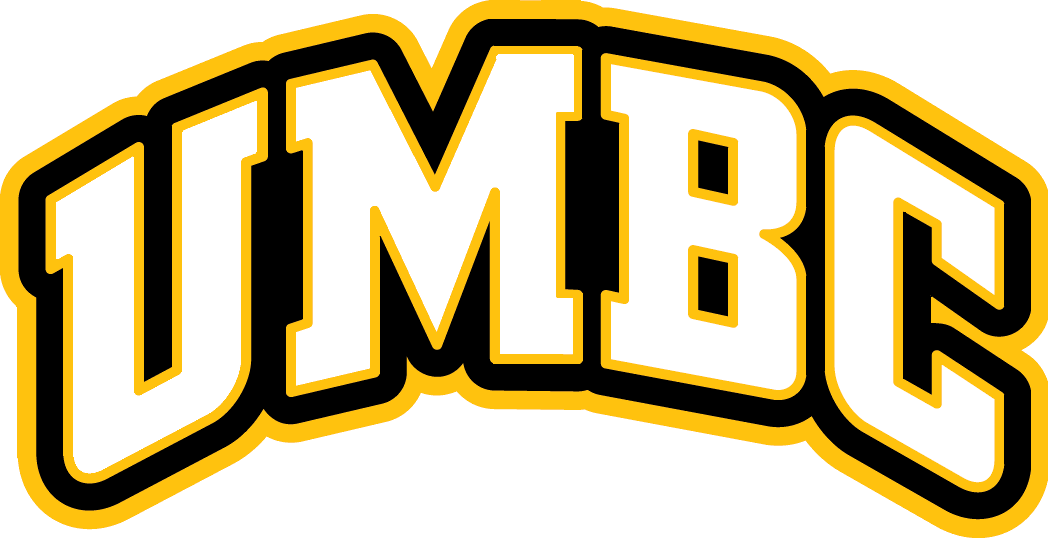
- Conference: America East Conference
- Record: 9–21 (5–11 America East)
- Head coach: Aki Thomas (2nd season)
- Assistant coaches: John Zito; Jay Greene; Brian Johnson
- Home arena: Retriever Activities Center

2013–14 America East Conference men's basketball standings
	Conf.				Overall
Team	W		L	PCT	W		L	PCT
Vermont	15	–	1	.938	22	–	11	.667
Stony Brook	13	–	3	.813	23	–	11	.676
Hartford	10	–	6	.625	17	–	16	.515
Albany †	9	–	7	.563	19	–	15	.559
UMass Lowell*	8	–	8	.500	10	–	18	.357
UMBC	5	–	11	.313	9	–	21	.300
Binghamton	4	–	12	.250	7	–	23	.233
Maine	4	–	12	.250	6	–	23	.207
New Hampshire	4	–	12	.250	6	–	24	.200
† 2014 America East tournament winner Rankings from AP poll *ineligible for postseason play due to Div. I transition

The 2013–14 UMBC Retrievers men's basketball team represented the University of Maryland, Baltimore County during the 2013–14 NCAA Division I men's basketball season. The Retrievers, led by second-year head coach Aki Thomas, played their home games at the Retriever Activities Center and were members of the America East Conference. They finished the season 9–21, 5–11 in American East play to finish in sixth place. They lost in the quarterfinals of the American East tournament to Albany.

== Roster ==
Number	Name	Position	Height	Weight	Year	Hometown
0	Aaron Morgan	Guard	5–11	175	Sophomore	Washington, Pennsylvania
1	Chase Plummer	Forward	6–6	235	Senior	Plainfield, New Jersey
2	Rodney Elliott	Guard	6–0	180	Freshman	Baltimore, Maryland
3	Quentin Jones	Guard	6–0	185	Senior	Baltimore, Maryland
4	Ben Grace	Guard	5–10	175	Freshman	Baltimore, Maryland
5	Joey Getz	Guard	6–0	180	Junior	Philadelphia, Pennsylvania
11	Charles Taylor, Jr.	Guard	6–4	185	Freshman	Silver Spring, Maryland
12	Will Darley	Guard	6–8	190	Freshman	Timonium, Maryland
13	Bryan Harris	Guard	6–2	180	Freshman	Oxon Hill, Maryland
21	Jamar Wertz	Guard	6–4	195	Senior	Suffolk, Virginia
23	Devarick Houston	Forward	6–7	190	Junior	Jonesboro, Georgia
24	David Kadiri	Forward/Center	6–8	190	Freshman	Beltsville, Maryland
33	Malik Garner	Forward	6–6	225	Sophomore	Philadelphia, Pennsylvania
35	Brett Roseboro	Forward/Center	6–10	240	Senior	Quakertown, Pennsylvania

== Schedule ==
Date time, TV	Opponent	Result	Record	Site (attendance) city, state
Regular season
11/08/2013*; 8:00 pm	at Arizona State	L 61–96	0–1	Wells Fargo Arena (5,086); Tempe, AZ
11/11/2013*; 7:30 pm	Eastern (PA)	W 84–79 ^{OT}	1–1	Retriever Activities Center (N/A); Catonsville, MD
11/14/2013*; 7:30 pm, CSNMA	at American	L 61–63 ^{OT}	1–2	Bender Arena (1,178); Washington, D.C.
11/17/2013*; 2:00 pm	Mount St. Mary's	W 90–84 ^{OT}	2–2	Retriever Activities Center (1,056); Catonsville, MD
11/20/2013*; 7:30 pm, MASN	Loyola (MD)	L 83–89 ^{OT}	2–3	Retriever Activities Center (1,741); Catonsville, MD
11/23/2013*; 7:00 pm	at Navy	L 58–73	2–4	Alumni Hall (1,908); Annapolis, MD
11/26/2013*; 7:30 pm	at Towson	L 60–75	2–5	Tiger Arena (1,879); Towson, MD
12/02/2013*; 7:00 pm	Maryland Eastern Shore	W 64–59	3–5	Retriever Activities Center (1,246); Catonsville, MD
12/04/2013*; 7:00 pm	at Duquesne	L 88–94	3–6	A. J. Palumbo Center (1,861); Pittsburgh, PA
12/07/2013*; 2:00 pm	at Lehigh	L 68–70	3–7	Stabler Arena (817); Bethlehem, PA
12/11/2013*; 7:30 pm	at Coppin State	L 71–91	3–8	Physical Education Complex (455); Baltimore, MD
12/21/2013*; 2:30 pm	at George Washington	L 61–74	3–9	Charles E. Smith Athletic Center (2,219); Washington, D.C.
12/30/2013*; 1:00 pm	Navy	W 63–48	4–9	Retriever Activities Center (1,672); Catonsville, MD
01/05/2014; 1:00 pm	at UMass Lowell	L 54–59	4–10 (0–1)	Costello Athletic Center (307); Lowell, MA
01/08/2014; 7:00 pm	at Albany	L 72–73 ^{OT}	4–11 (0–2)	SEFCU Arena (2,145); Albany, NY
01/11/2014; 3:30 pm	Maine	W 79–76	5–11 (1–2)	Retriever Activities Center (1,048); Catonsville, MD
01/15/2014; 7:00 pm	at New Hampshire	L 42–56	5–12 (1–3)	Lundholm Gym (426); Durham, NH
01/18/2014; 7:00 pm	Vermont	L 47–73	5–13 (1–4)	Retriever Activities Center (1,145); Catonsville, MD
01/20/2014; 2:00 pm, ESPN3	Stony Brook	L 62–81	5–14 (1–5)	Retriever Activities Center (1,073); Catonsville, MD
01/25/2014; 3:30 pm	Hartford	W 60–58	6–14 (2–5)	Retriever Activities Center (1,387); Catonsville, MD
01/29/2014; 7:00 pm	at Binghamton	W 73–61	7–14 (3–5)	Binghamton University Events Center (2,356); Vestal, NY
02/01/2014; 2:00 pm	at Maine	L 80–83	7–15 (3–6)	Cross Insurance Center (1,533); Bangor, ME
02/05/2014; 7:00 pm	New Hampshire	W 68–57	8–15 (4–6)	Retriever Activities Center (1,134); Catonsville, MD
02/08/2014; 2:00 pm	UMass Lowell	L 61–71	8–16 (4–7)	Retriever Activities Center (1,016); Catonsville, MD
02/12/2014; 7:00 pm, ESPN3	Albany	W 71–69	9–16 (5–7)	Retriever Activities Center (1,161); Catonsville, MD
02/15/2014; 2:00 pm	at Vermont	L 52–76	9–17 (5–8)	Patrick Gym (2,531); Burlington, VT
02/19/2014; 7:00 pm	at Stony Brook	L 53–72	9–18 (5–9)	Pritchard Gymnasium (1,630); Stony Brook, NY
02/22/2014; 7:00 pm	Binghamton	L 70–72	9–19 (5–10)	Retriever Activities Center (1,681); Catonsville, MD
03/02/2014; 2:00 pm	at Hartford	L 56–67	9–20 (5–11)	Chase Arena at Reich Family Pavilion (1,679); Hartford, CT
2014 America East tournament
03/08/2014; 2:30 pm, ESPN3	at Albany; Quarterfinals	L 56–86	9–21	SEFCU Arena (2,631); Albany, NY
*Non-conference game. ^{#}Rankings from AP Poll. (#) Tournament seedings in parentheses. All times are in Eastern Time.
