= 2013–14 Binghamton Bearcats men's basketball team =

American college basketball season

2013–14 Binghamton Bearcats men's basketball
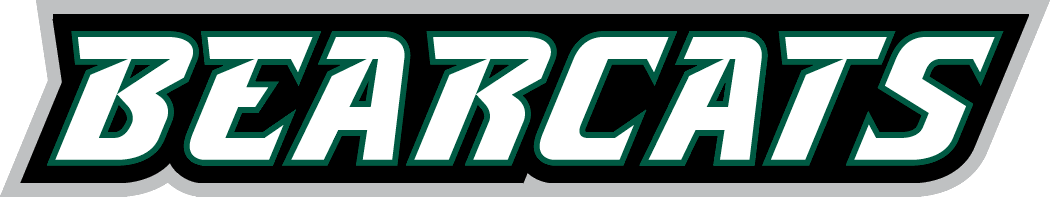
- Conference: America East Conference
- Record: 7–23 (4–12 America East)
- Head coach: Tommy Dempsey (2nd season)
- Assistant coaches: Ben Luber; Lazarus Sims; Bryan Goodman
- Home arena: Binghamton University Events Center

2013–14 America East Conference men's basketball standings
	Conf.				Overall
Team	W		L	PCT	W		L	PCT
Vermont	15	–	1	.938	22	–	11	.667
Stony Brook	13	–	3	.813	23	–	11	.676
Hartford	10	–	6	.625	17	–	16	.515
Albany †	9	–	7	.563	19	–	15	.559
UMass Lowell*	8	–	8	.500	10	–	18	.357
UMBC	5	–	11	.313	9	–	21	.300
Binghamton	4	–	12	.250	7	–	23	.233
Maine	4	–	12	.250	6	–	23	.207
New Hampshire	4	–	12	.250	6	–	24	.200
† 2014 America East tournament winner Rankings from AP poll *ineligible for postseason play due to Div. I transition

The 2013–14 Binghamton Bearcats men's basketball team represented Binghamton University during the 2013–14 NCAA Division I men's basketball season. The Bearcats, led by second year head coach Tommy Dempsey, played their home games at the Binghamton University Events Center and were members of the America East Conference. They finished the season 7–23, 4–12 in American East play to finish in a three way tie for seventh place. They lost in the quarterfinals of the American East tournament to Hartford.

== Roster ==
Number	Name	Position	Height	Weight	Year	Hometown
0	Karon Waller	Guard	6–4	200	Sophomore	Camden, New Jersey
1	Marlon Beck II	Guard	5–11	175	Freshman	Bowie, Maryland
2	Robert Mansell	Guard	6–4	200	Junior	Philadelphia, Pennsylvania
3	Jordan Reed	Guard	6–4	205	Sophomore	Philadelphia, Pennsylvania
5	Magnus Richards	Forward	6–7	210	Freshman	Silver Spring, Maryland
10	Yosef Yacob	Guard	6–0	170	Freshman	Chester, Pennsylvania
11	Rayner Moquete	Guard	6–1	195	Senior	Santo Domingo, Dominican Republic
12	John Rinaldi	Guard	6–1	190	Freshman	Dunmore, Pennsylvania
15	Alex Ogundadegbe	Forward	6–8	235	Senior	Bowie, Maryland
20	Matt Smith	Guard	5–10	180	Freshman	East Northport, New York
21	Nick Madray	Forward	6–9	215	Freshman	Mississauga, Ontario
23	Chris Rice	Guard	6–3	195	Junior	Sicklerville, New Jersey
25	Roland Brown	Forward	6–8	240	Senior	Queens, New York
32	Jabrille Williams	Forward	6–6	190	Junior	Stamford, Connecticut

== Schedule ==
Date time, TV	Opponent	Result	Record	Site (attendance) city, state
Exhibition
11/02/2013*; 2:00 pm	Bloomsburg	W 48–47		Binghamton University Events Center (1,655); Vestal, NY
Regular season
11/08/2013*; 8:00 pm	Loyola (MD)	L 74–79	0–1	Binghamton University Events Center (4,318); Vestal, NY
11/10/2013*; 3:30 pm	at Brown	L 57–74	0–2	Pizzitola Sports Center (1,050); Providence, RI
11/13/2013*; 7:00 pm	at Cornell	W 89–79	1–2	Newman Arena (1,113); Ithaca, NY
11/16/2013*; 7:00 pm	Navy	L 50–68	1–3	Binghamton University Events Center (2,625); Vestal, NY
11/23/2013*; 7:00 pm	Radford	L 63–69	1–4	Binghamton University Events Center (1,874); Vestal, NY
11/26/2013*; 7:00 pm	at St. Peter's	L 57–70	1–5	Yanitelli Center (364); Jersey City, NJ
12/01/2013*; 2:00 pm	Colgate	L 64–93	1–6	Binghamton University Events Center (1,789); Vestal, NY
12/04/2013*; 7:00 pm	at Mount St. Mary's	W 74–70	2–6	Knott Arena (813); Emmitsburg, MD
12/07/2013*; 7:00 pm	at No. 4 Syracuse	L 65–93	2–7	Carrier Dome (25,844); Syracuse, NY
12/14/2013*; 7:00 pm	at Monmouth	L 46–74	2–8	Multipurpose Activity Center (1,010); West Long Branch, NJ
12/23/2013*; 12:00 pm	at Buffalo	L 57–87	2–9	Alumni Arena (N/A); Buffalo, NY
12/28/2013*; 12:00 pm	Bryant	W 67–62	3–9	Binghamton University Events Center (3,463); Vestal, NY
12/31/2013*; 2:00 pm	at St. Joseph's	L 44–71	3–10	Hagan Arena (4,076); Philadelphia, PA
01/04/2014; 7:00 pm	at Maine	L 66–82	3–11 (0–1)	Cross Insurance Center (2,474); Bangor, ME
01/09/2014; 7:00 pm	New Hampshire	W 67–38	4–11 (1–1)	Binghamton University Events Center (1,879); Vestal, NY
01/11/2014; 4:30 pm	UMass Lowell	L 59–71	4–12 (1–2)	Binghamton University Events Center (2,835); Vestal, NY
01/15/2014; 7:00 pm	at Stony Brook	L 47–67	4–13 (1–3)	Pritchard Gymnasium (1,630); Stony Brook, NY
01/20/2014; 7:00 pm	at Albany	L 60–66	4–14 (1–4)	SEFCU Arena (2,956); Albany, NY
01/23/2014; 7:00 pm	Hartford	L 54–56	4–15 (1–5)	Binghamton University Events Center (1,858); Vestal, NY
01/26/2014; 7:00 pm	at Vermont	L 39–72	4–16 (1–6)	Patrick Gym (2,150); Burlington, VT
01/29/2014; 7:00 pm	UMBC	L 61–73	4–17 (1–7)	Binghamton University Events Center (2,356); Vestal, NY
02/01/2014; 2:00 pm	at UMass Lowell	L 55–62	4–18 (1–8)	Costello Athletic Center (349); Lowell, MA
02/04/2014; 7:00 pm, ESPN3	Stony Brook	L 53–58	4–19 (1–9)	Binghamton University Events Center (4,635); Vestal, NY
02/08/2014; 2:00 pm	Maine	W 73–58	5–19 (2–9)	Binghamton University Events Center (2,485); Vestal, NY
02/12/2014; 7:00 pm	at New Hampshire	W 72–71 ^{OT}	6–19 (3–9)	Lundholm Gym (529); Durham, NH
02/19/2014; 7:00 pm, ESPN3	Albany	L 48–57	6–20 (3–10)	Binghamton University Events Center (3,067); Vestal, NY
02/22/2014; 7:00 pm	at UMBC	W 72–70	7–20 (4–10)	Retriever Activities Center (1,681); Catonsville, MD
02/27/2014; 7:00 pm	at Hartford	L 83–89 ^{OT}	7–21 (4–11)	Chase Arena at Reich Family Pavilion (1,847); Hartford, CT
03/02/2014; 2:00 pm	Vermont	L 82–92 ^{OT}	7–22 (4–12)	Binghamton University Events Center (2,907); Vestal, NY
2014 America East tournament
03/08/2014; 8:30 pm, ESPN3	vs. Hartford; Quarterfinals	L 42–69	7–23	SEFCU Arena (N/A); Albany, NY
*Non-conference game. ^{#}Rankings from AP Poll. (#) Tournament seedings in parentheses. All times are in Eastern Time.
