= 2013–14 Maine Black Bears men's basketball team =

American college basketball season

2013–14 Maine Black Bears men's basketball
- Conference: America East Conference
- Record: 6–23 (4–12 America East)
- Head coach: Ted Woodward (10th season)
- Assistant coaches: Douglas Leichner; Jon Sheets; Deshon Gaither
- Home arena: Memorial Gym; Cross Insurance Center

2013–14 America East Conference men's basketball standings
| | Conf. | | | | Overall |
| Team | W | | L | PCT | W | | L | PCT |
|---|---|---|---|---|---|---|---|---|
| Vermont | 15 | – | 1 | .938 | 22 | – | 11 | .667 |
| Stony Brook | 13 | – | 3 | .813 | 23 | – | 11 | .676 |
| Hartford | 10 | – | 6 | .625 | 17 | – | 16 | .515 |
| Albany † | 9 | – | 7 | .563 | 19 | – | 15 | .559 |
| UMass Lowell* | 8 | – | 8 | .500 | 10 | – | 18 | .357 |
| UMBC | 5 | – | 11 | .313 | 9 | – | 21 | .300 |
| Binghamton | 4 | – | 12 | .250 | 7 | – | 23 | .233 |
| Maine | 4 | – | 12 | .250 | 6 | – | 23 | .207 |
| New Hampshire | 4 | – | 12 | .250 | 6 | – | 24 | .200 |
† 2014 America East tournament winner Rankings from AP poll *ineligible for postseason play due to Div. I transition

The 2013–14 Maine Black Bears men's basketball team represented the University of Maine during the 2013–14 NCAA Division I men's basketball season. The Black Bears, led by tenth year head coach Ted Woodward, played their home games at Memorial Gym and Cross Insurance Center and were members of the America East Conference. They finished the season 6–23, 4–12 in American East play to finish in a three way tie for seventh place. They lost in the quarterfinals of the American East tournament to Stony Brook.

== Roster ==
| Number | Name | Position | Height | Weight | Year | Hometown |
|---|---|---|---|---|---|---|
| 1 | Dimitry Akanda-Coronel | Guard/Forward | 6–4 | 190 | Junior | Boston, Massachusetts |
| 3 | Christian Ejiga | Forward | 6–8 | 225 | Freshman | Lagos, Nigeria |
| 4 | Marko Pirovic | Forward | 6–7 | 205 | Freshman | Bolton, Ontario |
| 5 | Zarko Valjarevic | Forward | 6–4 | 210 | Junior | Belgrade, Serbia |
| 10 | Shaun Lawton | Guard | 6–5 | 190 | Sophomore | Harlem, New York |
| 11 | Erik Nissen | Forward | 6–9 | 215 | Freshman | Quispamsis, New Brunswick |
| 13 | Stefan Micovic | Forward | 6–9 | 210 | Sophomore | Pondov, Serbia |
| 25 | Till Gloger | Forward | 6–8 | 220 | Sophomore | Bochum, Germany |
| 31 | Troy Reid-Knight | Guard | 6–0 | 190 | Freshman | Vaughan, Ontario |
| 33 | Ethan Mackey | Forward | 6–7 | 220 | RS–Sophomore | Voorheesville, New York |
| 42 | Luke Hetterman | Guard | 5–9 | 160 | Junior | Bangor, Maine |
| 54 | Arturas Besevicius | Guard | 6–4 | 209 | Freshman | Vilnius, Lithuania |
| 55 | Garet Beal | Guard/Forward | 6–6 | 215 | Freshman | Beals, Maine |

== Schedule ==
| Date time, TV | Opponent | Result | Record | Site (attendance) city, state |
Exhibition
| 10/26/2013*; 2:00 pm | McGill | W 83–57 | | Memorial Gym; Orono, ME |
| 11/01/2013*; 7:00 pm | Laval | W 88–79 | | Memorial Gym; Orono, ME |
Regular season
| 11/08/2013*; 7:30 pm | at Rhode Island | L 77–97 | 0–1 | Ryan Center (5,410); Kingston, RI |
| 11/10/2013*; 3:00 pm | Fisher | W 111–64 | 1–1 | Memorial Gym (102); Orono, ME |
| 11/12/2013*; 7:00 pm | at George Washington | L 81–108 | 1–2 | Charles E. Smith Athletic Center (1,448); Washington, DC |
| 11/19/2013*; 7:00 pm | NJIT | L 82–88 | 1–3 | Cross Insurance Center (1,772); Bangor, ME |
| 11/25/2013*; 7:00 pm | Quinnipiac | L 61–102 | 1–4 | Cross Insurance Center (N/A); Bangor, ME |
| 12/01/2013*; 2:00 pm | Dartmouth | L 56–81 | 1–5 | Cross Insurance Center (1,009); Bangor, ME |
| 12/04/2013*; 7:00 pm | at NJIT | L 72–81 | 1–6 | Fleisher Center (688); Newark, NJ |
| 12/06/2013*; 7:00 pm, ESPN3 | at No. 12 UConn | L 68–95 | 1–7 | XL Center (9,681); Hartford, CT |
| 12/13/2013*; 6:00 pm | Army | L 80–90 | 1–8 | Cross Insurance Center (1,038); Bangor, ME |
| 12/15/2013*; 2:00 pm | Maine at Presque Isle | | | Memorial Gym; Orono, ME |
| 12/21/2013*; 7:00 pm | at Providence | L 70–94 | 1–9 | Dunkin' Donuts Center (5,328); Providence, RI |
| 12/29/2013*; 4:30 pm | vs. Middle Tennessee; Dr. Pepper Classic | W 89–85 ^{OT} | 2–9 | McKenzie Arena (N/A); Chattanooga, TN |
| 12/30/2013*; 9:00 pm | vs. Chattanooga; Dr. Pepper Classic | L 80–86 | 2–10 | McKenzie Arena (N/A); Chattanooga, TN |
| 01/05/2014; 4:30 pm | Binghamton | W 82–66 | 3–10 (1–0) | Cross Insurance Center (2,474); Bangor, ME |
| 01/07/2014; 7:00 pm | at Hartford | L 65–80 | 3–11 (1–1) | Chase Arena at Reich Family Pavilion (892); Hartford, CT |
| 01/11/2014; 3:30 pm | at UMBC | L 76–79 | 3–12 (1–2) | Retriever Activities Center (1,048); Catonsville, MD |
| 01/16/2014; 7:00 pm | Vermont | L 46–83 | 3–13 (1–3) | Cross Insurance Center (1,116); Bangor, ME |
| 01/18/2014; 2:00 pm | Albany | L 78–85 | 3–14 (1–4) | Memorial Gym (1,181); Orono, ME |
| 01/23/2014; 7:00 pm | UMass Lowell | L 62–74 | 3–15 (1–5) | Cross Insurance Center (1,157); Bangor, ME |
| 01/26/2014; 2:00 pm | at Stony Brook | L 61–79 | 3–16 (1–6) | Pritchard Gymnasium (1,630); Stony Brook, NY |
| 01/29/2014; 7:00 pm | at New Hampshire | W 68–60 | 4–16 (2–6) | Lundholm Gym (N/A); Durham, NH |
| 02/01/2014; 2:00 pm | UMBC | W 83–80 | 5–16 (3–6) | Cross Insurance Center (1,533); Bangor, ME |
| 02/04/2014; 7:00 pm | at Vermont | L 65–93 | 5–17 (3–7) | Patrick Gym (2,106); Burlington, VT |
| 02/08/2014; 2:00 pm | at Binghamton | L 58–73 | 5–18 (3–8) | Binghamton University Events Center (2,485); Vestal, NY |
| 02/12/2014; 7:00 pm | Hartford | L 79–91 | 5–19 (3–9) | Cross Insurance Center (1,082); Bangor, ME |
| 02/15/2014; 2:00 pm | at Albany | L 63–74 | 5–20 (3–10) | SEFCU Arena (2,912); Albany, NY |
| 02/23/2014; 2:00 pm | Stony Brook | L 79–83 | 5–21 (3–11) | Cross Insurance Center (1,424); Bangor, ME |
| 02/27/2014; 2:00 pm | at UMass Lowell | L 72–84 | 5–22 (3–12) | Costello Athletic Center (646); Lowell, MA |
| 03/02/2014; 2:00 pm | New Hampshire | W 73–69 | 6–22 (4–12) | Cross Insurance Center (1,296); Bangor, ME |
2014 America East tournament
| 03/08/2014; 6:00 pm, ESPN3 | vs. Stony Brook; Quarterfinals | L 54–80 | 6–23 | SEFCU Arena (N/A); Albany, NY |
*Non-conference game. ^{#}Rankings from AP Poll. (#) Tournament seedings in parentheses. All times are in Eastern Time.

* The December 15 game against Maine–Presque Isle was canceled due to inclement weather.
