= 2013–14 Stony Brook Seawolves men's basketball team =

American college basketball season

2013–14 Stony Brook Seawolves men's basketball

CBI First round vs. Siena, L 55–66
- Conference: America East Conference
- Record: 23–11 (13–3 America East)
- Head coach: Steve Pikiell (9th season)
- Assistant coaches: Jay Young (9th season); Lamar Chapman; Dan Rickard
- Home arena: Pritchard Gymnasium

2013–14 America East Conference men's basketball standings
	Conf.				Overall
Team	W		L	PCT	W		L	PCT
Vermont	15	–	1	.938	22	–	11	.667
Stony Brook	13	–	3	.813	23	–	11	.676
Hartford	10	–	6	.625	17	–	16	.515
Albany †	9	–	7	.563	19	–	15	.559
UMass Lowell*	8	–	8	.500	10	–	18	.357
UMBC	5	–	11	.313	9	–	21	.300
Binghamton	4	–	12	.250	7	–	23	.233
Maine	4	–	12	.250	6	–	23	.207
New Hampshire	4	–	12	.250	6	–	24	.200
† 2014 America East tournament winner Rankings from AP poll *ineligible for postseason play due to Div. I transition

The 2013–14 Stony Brook Seawolves men's basketball team represented Stony Brook University in the 2013–14 NCAA Division I men's basketball season. They were coached by ninth year head coach Steve Pikiell and played their home games at Pritchard Gymnasium. They were members of the America East Conference. They finished the season 23–11, 13–3 in American East play to finish in second place. They advanced to the championship game of the American East Conference tournament where they lost to Albany. They were invited to the College Basketball Invitational where they lost in the first round to Siena.

== Roster ==
2013–14 Stony Brook Seawolves men's basketball team
Players
Coaches

Pos.	#	Name	Height	Weight	Year	Hometown
G	2	Kameron Mitchell	6 ft 4 in (1.93 m)	175 lb (79 kg)	Fr	Jacksonville, FL
G	3	Ahmad Walker	6 ft 4 in (1.93 m)	185 lb (84 kg)	Fr	Port Washington, NY
G	4	Anthony Jackson	6 ft 0 in (1.83 m)	185 lb (84 kg)	Sr	Columbus, OH
G	5	Dave Coley	6 ft 2 in (1.88 m)	190 lb (86 kg)	Sr	Brooklyn, NY
G	10	Carson Puriefoy	6 ft 0 in (1.83 m)	175 lb (79 kg)	So	Wenonah, NJ
G	11	Ben Resner	6 ft 2 in (1.88 m)	185 lb (84 kg)	Sr	Centerport, NY
F	20	Jameel Warney	6 ft 8 in (2.03 m)	220 lb (100 kg)	So	Plainfield, NJ
F	21	Rayshaun McGrew	6 ft 7 in (2.01 m)	230 lb (104 kg)	So	Chicago, IL
F	22	Eric McAlister	6 ft 8 in (2.03 m)	220 lb (100 kg)	Sr	Hightstown, NJ
G/F	23	Chris Braley	6 ft 5 in (1.96 m)	205 lb (93 kg)	Fr	Newport, ME
G/F	24	Roland Nyama	6 ft 6 in (1.98 m)	200 lb (91 kg)	Fr	Frankfurt, Germany
F	32	Anthony Mayo	6 ft 10 in (2.08 m)	235 lb (107 kg)	Jr	Philadelphia, PA
G	33	Ryan Burnett	6 ft 4 in (1.93 m)	190 lb (86 kg)	So	Richmond, VA
F	35	Scott King	6 ft 10 in (2.08 m)	220 lb (100 kg)	So	Plymouth, NH

Head coach

- Steve Pikiell

Assistant coach(es)

- Jay Young (Marist)
- Lamar Chapman
- Dan Rickard

Legend

- (C) Team captain
- (S) Suspended
- (I) Ineligible
- (W) Walk-on
- Injured
- Current redshirt

Roster
Last update: July 11, 2012

== Schedule ==
Date time, TV	Rank^{#}	Opponent^{#}	Result	Record	Site (attendance) city, state
Non-conference regular season
11/08/2013*; 8:00 pm, AETV		Marist	W 71–55	1–0	Pritchard Gymnasium (1,630); Stony Brook, NY
11/10/2013*; 2:00 pm		Haverford	W 81–65	2–0	Pritchard Gymnasium (1,213); Stony Brook, NY
11/13/2013*; 7:00 pm, AETV		Northeastern	W 73–66	3–0	Pritchard Gymnasium (1,266); Stony Brook, NY
11/17/2013*; 5:00 pm, BTN		at Indiana; 2K Sports Classic	L 74–90	3–1	Assembly Hall (17,472); Bloomington, IN
11/22/2013*; 4:30 pm		vs. Toledo; 2K Sports Classic	L 99–103	3–2	Calihan Hall (N/A); Detroit, MI
11/23/2013*; 3:00 pm		vs. Florida Atlantic; 2K Sports Classic	W 67–61	4–2	Calihan Hall (N/A); Detroit, MI
11/24/2013*; 4:00 pm		at Detroit; 2K Sports Classic	W 104–102 ^{3OT}	5–2	Calihan Hall (N/A); Detroit, MI
12/01/2013*; 2:00 pm		St. Francis Brooklyn	W 70–68	5–3	Pritchard Gymnasium (1,456); Stony Brook, NY
12/04/2013*; 7:00 pm		Fairleigh Dickinson	W 77–62	6–3	Pritchard Gymnasium (1,224); Stony Brook, NY
12/07/2013*; 11:00 am		vs. La Salle; MSG Holiday Festival	L 57–65	6–4	Madison Square Garden (N/A); New York, NY
12/15/2013; 1:00 pm		at New Hampshire	W 67–48	7–4 (1–0)	Lundholm Gym (573); Durham, NH
12/19/2013*; 7:30 pm		at Loyola (MD)	W 76–69	8–4	Reitz Arena (573); Baltimore, MD
12/22/2013*; 6:00 pm		Cornell	W 76–54	9–4	Pritchard Gymnasium (1,630); Stony Brook, NY
01/03/2014*; 9:00 pm		vs. VCU	L 63–81	9–5	Stuart C. Siegel Center (7,741); Richmond, VA
01/08/2014*; 7:00		at Columbia	L 63–68	9–6	Levien Gymnasium (605); New York, NY
America East regular season
01/12/2014; 2:30 pm, ESPN3		at Hartford	W 73–50	10–6 (2–0)	Chase Arena at Reich Family Pavilion (2,992); West Hartford, CT
01/15/2014; 7:00 pm		Binghamton	W 67–47	11–6 (3–0)	Pritchard Gymnasium (1,630); Stony Brook, NY
01/18/2014; 7:00 pm		UMass Lowell	W 70–65	12–6 (4–0)	Pritchard Gymnasium (1,630); Stony Brook, NY
01/20/2014; 2:00 pm, ESPN3		at UMBC	W 81–62	13–6 (5–0)	Retriever Activities Center (1,073); Baltimore, MD
01/24/2014; 9:00 pm, ESPNU		Vermont	W 67–64	14–6 (6–0)	Pritchard Gymnasium (1,630); Stony Brook, NY
01/26/2014; 2:00 pm		Maine	W 79–61	15–6 (7–0)	Pritchard Gymnasium (1,630); Stony Brook, NY
01/29/2014; 7:00 pm		at Albany	L 67–77	15–7 (7–1)	SEFCU Arena (2,482); Albany, NY
02/01/2014; 2:00 pm, ESPN3		Hartford	W 56–52	16–7 (8–1)	Pritchard Gymnasium (1,630); Stony Brook, NY
02/04/2014; 7:00 pm, ESPN3		at Binghamton	W 58–53	17–7 (9–1)	Binghamton University Events Center (4,635); Vestal, NY
02/08/2014; 2:00 pm		New Hampshire	L 69–73	17–8 (9–2)	Pritchard Gymnasium (1,630); Stony Brook, NY
02/15/2014; 4:00 pm		at UMass Lowell	W 78–68	18–8 (10–2)	Tsongas Center (1,676); Lowell, MA
02/19/2014; 7:00 pm		UMBC	W 72–53	19–8 (11–2)	Pritchard Gymnasium (1,630); Stony Brook, NY
02/23/2014; 2:00 pm		at Maine	W 83–79	20–8 (12–2)	Cross Insurance Center (1,424); Bangor, ME
02/27/2014; 7:00 pm, ESPN3		at Vermont	L 53–69	20–9 (12–3)	Patrick Gym (3,266); Burlington, VT
03/02/2014; 2:00 pm		Albany	W 73–68	21–9 (13–3)	Pritchard Gymnasium (1,630); Stony Brook, NY
America East tournament
03/08/2014; 6:00 pm, ESPN3	(2)	vs. (7) Maine; Quarterfinals	W 80–54	22–9	SEFCU Arena (N/A); Albany, NY
03/09/2014; 7:45 pm, ESPN3	(2)	vs. (3) Hartford; Semifinals	W 69–64	23–9	SEFCU Arena (2,724); Albany, NY
03/15/2014; 11:30 am, ESPN2	(2)	(4) Albany; Championship	L 60–69	23–10	Pritchard Gymnasium (1,630); Stony Brook, NY
CBI
03/18/2014*; 7:00 pm		at Siena; First round	L 55–66	23–11	Times Union Center (2,575); Albany, NY
*Non-conference game. ^{#}Rankings from AP Poll. (#) Tournament seedings in parentheses. All times are in Eastern Time.
