= 2013–14 Albany Great Danes men's basketball team =

American college basketball season

2013–14 Albany Great Danes men's basketball

America East tournament champions

NCAA tournament, round of 64
- Conference: America East Conference
- Record: 19–15 (9–7 America East)
- Head coach: Will Brown (13th season)
- Assistant coaches: Chad O'Donnell; Jeremy Friel; Jon Iati
- Home arena: SEFCU Arena

2013–14 America East Conference men's basketball standings
	Conf.				Overall
Team	W		L	PCT	W		L	PCT
Vermont	15	–	1	.938	22	–	11	.667
Stony Brook	13	–	3	.813	23	–	11	.676
Hartford	10	–	6	.625	17	–	16	.515
Albany †	9	–	7	.563	19	–	15	.559
UMass Lowell*	8	–	8	.500	10	–	18	.357
UMBC	5	–	11	.313	9	–	21	.300
Binghamton	4	–	12	.250	7	–	23	.233
Maine	4	–	12	.250	6	–	23	.207
New Hampshire	4	–	12	.250	6	–	24	.200
† 2014 America East tournament winner Rankings from AP poll *ineligible for postseason play due to Div. I transition

The 2013–14 Albany Great Danes men's basketball team represented the University at Albany, SUNY during the 2013–14 NCAA Division I men's basketball season. The Great Danes, led by 13th year head coach Will Brown, played their home games at SEFCU Arena and were members of the America East Conference. They finished the season 19–15, 9–7 in American East play to finish in fourth place. They were champions of the America East Conference tournament to earn an automatic bid to the NCAA tournament. In the NCAA Tournament, they defeated Mount St. Mary's in the First Four before losing in the second round to Florida.

== Roster ==
2013–14 Albany Great Danes men's basketball team
Players
Coaches

Pos.	#	Name	Height	Weight	Year	Previous school	Hometown
G	0	Anthony Odunsi	6 ft 4 in (1.93 m)	210 lb (95 kg)	Jr	Tyler	Sugar Land, Texas
G	3	D. J. Evans	5 ft 9 in (1.75 m)	175 lb (79 kg)	Sr	East Mississippi	Brandon, Mississippi
F	4	Levan Shengelia	6 ft 9 in (2.06 m)	250 lb (113 kg)	Jr	Odessa	Tbilisi, Republic of Georgia
G	5	Anders Haas	6 ft 1 in (1.85 m)	175 lb (79 kg)	So	State College of Florida; Bishop O'Dowd	Copenhagen, Denmark
F	10	Mike Rowley	6 ft 8 in (2.03 m)	230 lb (104 kg)	Fr	Knox Grammar School	Sydney, Australia
F	11	Luke Devlin	6 ft 8 in (2.03 m)	235 lb (107 kg)	Sr	Newington College	Sydney, Australia
G	12	Peter Hooley	6 ft 4 in (1.93 m)	200 lb (91 kg)	So	Concordia College	Hahndorf, South Australia
G	13	Reece Williams	6 ft 1 in (1.85 m)	200 lb (91 kg)	So	Woodlands	White Plains, New York
F	14	Sam Rowley	6 ft 6 in (1.98 m)	200 lb (91 kg)	Jr	Knox Grammar School	Sydney, Australia
F	15	Ede Egharevba	6 ft 6 in (1.98 m)	210 lb (95 kg)	So	Midland	Queens, New York
F	20	Gary Johnson	6 ft 6 in (1.98 m)	205 lb (93 kg)	Sr	Oxnard (CA)	Moreno Valley, California
F	22	Dave Wiegmann	6 ft 8 in (2.03 m)	215 lb (98 kg)	Sr	Southwestern Illinois	Breese, Illinois
F	24	Dallas Ennema	6 ft 6 in (1.98 m)	210 lb (95 kg)	Fr	Sheldon	Sheldon, Iowa
C	44	John Puk	6 ft 10 in (2.08 m)	235 lb (107 kg)	Sr	Waterloo West	Waterloo, Iowa

Head coach

- Will Brown, 13th yr. (Dowling, 1995)

Assistant coach(es)

- Chad O'Donnell, 10th yr. (Springfield, 1994)
- Jeremy Friel, 7th yr. (New Hampshire, 2005)
- Jon Iati, 2nd yr. (Albany, 2007)

Legend

- (C) Team captain
- (S) Suspended
- (I) Ineligible
- (W) Walk-on
- Injured
- Current redshirt

Roster
Last update: October 27, 2013

== Schedule ==
Date time, TV	Rank^{#}	Opponent^{#}	Result	Record	High points	High rebounds	High assists	Site (attendance) city, state
Regular season
11/08/2013*; 7:00 pm		at Siena; Mayor's Cup	W 74–62	1–0	17 – Tied	9 – Rowley	2 – Evans	Times Union Center (11,311); Albany, NY
11/12/2013*; 7:00 pm		NJIT	W 71–65	2–0	20 – Evans	5 – Johnson	4 – Johnson	SEFCU Arena (3,141); Albany, NY
11/16/2013*; 2:00 pm		at Quinnipiac	L 69–79	2–1	20 – Rowley	6 – Tied	5 – Evans	TD Bank Sports Center (1,885); Hamden, CT
11/20/2013*; 7:00 pm		at Duquesne	L 59–70	2–2	21 – Hooley	10 – Rowley	3 – Tied	A. J. Palumbo Center (1,991); Pittsburgh, PA
11/23/2013*; 7:00 pm		Bucknell	L 64–77	2–3	21 – Hooley	10 – Rowley	3 – Evans	SEFCU Arena (3,756); Albany, NY
11/26/2013*; 7:00 pm		at Rider	W 70–59	3–3	24 – Hooley	14 – Wiegmann	4 – Wiegmann	Alumni Gymnasium (1,030); Lawrenceville, NJ
12/01/2013*; 2:00 pm		at NJIT	W 66–55	4–3	17 – Evans	9 – Rowley	3 – Wiegmann	Fleisher Center (600); Newark, NJ
12/04/2013*; 7:00 pm		at Holy Cross	L 57–62	4–4	19 – Hooley	7 – Rowley	4 – Evans	Hart Center (1,374); Worcester, MA
12/10/2013*; 7:00 pm		at Brown	W 74–68	5–4	20 – Rowley	7 – Shengelia	3 – Hooley	Pizzitola Sports Center (N/A); Providence, RI
12/14/2013*; 7:00 pm		Colgate	L 60–69	5–5	21 – Rowley	11 – Rowley	4 – Johnson	SEFCU Arena (1,821); Albany, NY
12/20/2013*; 7:00 pm		Yale	W 70–62	6–5	14 – Evans	9 – Evans	4 – Devlin	SEFCU Arena (2,108); Albany, NY
12/23/2013*; 7:00 pm		at Drake	L 63–71	6–6	16 – Puk	7 – Puk	5 – Hooley	Knapp Center (3,389); Des Moines, IA
12/31/2013*; 1:00 pm, ESPN3		at Pittsburgh	W 58–46	6–7	18 – Evans	8 – Rowley	5 – Rowley	Petersen Events Center (10,049); Pittsburgh, PA
01/04/2014; 7:00 pm		Hartford	W 81–58	7–7 (1–0)	25 – Hooley	9 – Puk	6 – Hooley	SEFCU Arena (2,556); Albany, NY
01/08/2014; 7:00 pm		UMBC	W 73–72 ^{2OT}	8–7 (2–0)	27 – Hooley	12 – Rowley	4 – Evans	SEFCU Arena (2,145); Albany, NY
01/11/2014; 7:00 pm		at Vermont	L 38–68	8–8 (2–1)	9 – Johnson	5 – Tied	2 – Johnson	Patrick Gym (2,583); Burlington, VT
01/15/2014; 7:00 pm		at UMass Lowell	L 66–70 ^{OT}	8–9 (2–2)	13 – Tied	9 – Egharevba	6 – Evans	Costello Athletic Center (243); Lowell, MA
01/18/2014; 2:00 pm		at Maine	W 85–78	9–9 (3–2)	28 – Johnson	5 – Rowley	6 – Hooley	Memorial Gym (1,181); Orono, ME
01/20/2014; 7:00 pm		Binghamton	W 66–60	10–9 (4–2)	17 – Hooley	7 – Tied	4 – Hooley	SEFCU Arena (2,956); Albany, NY
01/23/2014; 7:00 pm		at New Hampshire	L 56–60	10–10 (4–3)	22 – Evans	8 – Rowley	2 – Hooley	Lundholm Gym (N/A); Durham, NH
01/29/2014; 7:00 pm		Stony Brook	W 77–67	11–10 (5–3)	19 – Johnson	11 – Rowley	4 – Evans	SEFCU Arena (2,482); Albany, NY
02/01/2014; 7:30 pm, ESPN3		Vermont; Big Purple Growl, Homecoming	L 45–55	11–11 (5–4)	11 – Hooley	7 – Rowley	4 – Hooley	SEFCU Arena (4,583); Albany, NY
02/05/2014; 7:00 pm		UMass Lowell	W 73–56	12–11 (6–4)	21 – Hooley	9 – Puk	5 – Evans	SEFCU Arena (1,435); Albany, NY
02/08/2014; 7:00 pm		at Hartford	L 54–67	12–12 (6–5)	14 – Rowley	11 – Rowley	1 – 5 Tied	Chase Arena at Reich Family Pavilion (2,230); Hartford, CT
02/12/2014; 7:00 pm, ESPN3		at UMBC	L 69–71	12–13 (6–6)	21 – Hooley	7 – Johnson	4 – Evans	Retriever Activities Center (1,161); Baltimore, MD
02/15/2014; 2:00 pm, ESPN3		Maine	W 74–63	13–13 (7–6)	21 – Hooley	7 – Puk	5 – Tied	SEFCU Arena (2,912); Albany, NY
02/19/2014; 7:00 pm, ESPN3		at Binghamton	W 57–48	14–13 (8–6)	13 – Hooley	10 – Rowley	4 – Evans	Binghamton University Events Center (3,067); Vestal, NY
02/27/2014; 7:00 pm		New Hampshire	W 66–48	15–13 (9–6)	19 – Rowley	6 – Rowley	3 – Hooley	SEFCU Arena (1,980); Albany, NY
03/02/2014; 2:00 pm		at Stony Brook	L 68–73	15–14 (9–7)	15 – Tied	8 – Tied	5 – Evans	Pritchard Gymnasium (1,630); Stony Brook, NY
America East tournament
03/08/2014; 2:30 pm, ESPN3		UMBC; Quarterfinals	W 86–56	16–14	30 – Hooley	7 – Devlin	4 – Evans	SEFCU Arena (2,631); Albany, NY
03/09/2014; 5:00 pm, ESPN3		Vermont; Semifinals	W 67–58	17–14	26 – Hooley	13 – Johnson	1 – Tied	SEFCU Arena (2,724); Albany, NY
03/15/2014; 11:30 am, ESPN2		at Stony Brook; Championship	W 69–60	18–14	18 – Rowley	10 – Johnson	3 – Tied	Pritchard Gymnasium (1,630); Stony Brook, NY
NCAA tournament
03/18/2014*; 6:40 pm, truTV	(16 S)	vs. (16 S) Mount St. Mary's; First Four	W 71–64	19–14	22 – Evans	13 – Rowley	3 – Tied	University of Dayton Arena (12,077); Dayton, OH
03/20/2014*; 4:10 pm, TBS	(16 S)	vs. (1 S) No. 1 Florida; Second round	L 55–67	19–15	21 – Evans	7 – Evans	4 – Rowley	Amway Center (16,074); Orlando, FL
*Non-conference game. ^{#}Rankings from AP Poll. (#) Tournament seedings in parentheses. S=South Region. All times are in Eastern Time.
