= 2014 America East men's basketball tournament =

- Classification: Division I
- Season: 2013–14
- Teams: 8
- Quarterfinals site: SEFCU Arena; Albany, New York
- Semifinals site: SEFCU Arena; Albany, New York
- Finals site: Pritchard Gymnasium; Stony Brook, New York
- Champions: Albany (4th title)
- Winning coach: Will Brown (4th title)
- MVP: Peter Hooley (Albany)
- Television: ESPN2

2013–14 America East Conference men's basketball standings
	Conf.				Overall
Team	W		L	PCT	W		L	PCT
Vermont	15	–	1	.938	22	–	11	.667
Stony Brook	13	–	3	.813	23	–	11	.676
Hartford	10	–	6	.625	17	–	16	.515
Albany †	9	–	7	.563	19	–	15	.559
UMass Lowell*	8	–	8	.500	10	–	18	.357
UMBC	5	–	11	.313	9	–	21	.300
Binghamton	4	–	12	.250	7	–	23	.233
Maine	4	–	12	.250	6	–	23	.207
New Hampshire	4	–	12	.250	6	–	24	.200
† 2014 America East tournament winner Rankings from AP poll *ineligible for postseason play due to Div. I transition

The 2014 America East men's basketball tournament began on March 8 and concluded with the championship game on March 15. The quarterfinals and semifinals were played on March 8 and 9 at SEFCU Arena in Albany, New York, while the 2014 championship game was held on March 15 at the home of the highest remaining seed. The winner earned an automatic bid to the 2014 NCAA tournament.

== Bracket and results ==
Quarterfinals; Saturday, March 8, 2014; ESPN3
1	Vermont	77
8	New Hampshire	60
4	Albany	86
5	UMBC	56
2	Stony Brook	80
7	Maine	54
3	Hartford	69
6	Binghamton	42

Semifinals; Sunday, March 9, 2014; ESPN3
1	Vermont	58
4	Albany	67
2	Stony Brook	69
3	Hartford	64

Championship; Saturday, March 15, 2014; ESPN2
4	Albany	69
2	Stony Brook	60

== See also ==
- America East Conference
- 2014 America East women's basketball tournament
