= Aki Thomas =

American college basketball coach (born 1979)

Biographical details
- Born: May 14, 1979 (age 47); New York City, New York, U.S.

Playing career
- 1997–2000: Colorado
- 2001–2002: Howard

Coaching career (HC unless noted)
- 2004–2007: Howard (assistant)
- 2007–2012: UMBC (assistant)
- 2012–2016: UMBC

Head coaching record
- Overall: 28–95

Aki Thomas (born May 14, 1979) is an American college basketball coach. He served as the head men's basketball coach at the University of Maryland, Baltimore County (UMBC) from 2012 to 2016. He replaced Randy Monroe, who resigned just two days before the start of the 2012–13 season.

== Biography ==
=== Playing career ===
Thomas played three seasons at the University of Colorado, where he was a part of two NIT squads for the Buffaloes. For his final season of eligibility, Thomas transferred to Howard University, where he was named to the MEAC Second Team All-Conference after averaging 12 points per game along with 8 rebounds a contest, helping the Bison to an 18–13 record.

After graduation, Thomas spent two years playing professionally in Venezuela.

=== Coaching career ===
After playing pro ball, Thomas joined the coaching staff at Howard in 2004 under Frankie Allen. In 2007, he joined the staff at UMBC, where he was a part of the Retrievers' 2008 America East Championship season and appearance in the 2008 NCAA tournament.

Just two days before the 2012–13 season, Thomas was named the acting head coach of UMBC after Randy Monroe was relieved of his duties. Thomas led the Retrievers to a 7–22 record and 8th-place finish in the America East Conference. The seven wins were the most for the program since the 2008–09 season. On March 4, 2013, the interim title was removed and Thomas was named the permanent head coach.

After four seasons and a 29–95 record, Thomas was fired by UMBC.

== Head coaching record ==
Record table
Season	Team	Overall	Conference	Standing	Postseason
UMBC Retrievers (America East Conference) (2012–2016)
2012–13	UMBC	8–23	5–11	8th	
2013–14	UMBC	9–21	5–11	6th	
2014–15	UMBC	4–26	2–14	T–8th	
2015–16	UMBC	7–25	3–13	9th	
UMBC:		28–95 (.228)	15–51 (.227)		
Total:		28–95 (.228)			
