= Ted Woodward =

Ted Woodward may refer to:

- Ted Woodward (basketball) (born 1963), American former college basketball coach
- Ted Woodward (rugby union) (1931–2017), English former international rugby player
