= Ted Woodward (basketball) =

American former college basketball coach (born 1963)

Current position
- Title: Associate Athletic Director, Development
- Team: UConn Huskies

Biographical details
- Born: November 28, 1963 (age 62); Suffern, New York, U.S.

Coaching career (HC unless noted)
- 1986–1989: Connecticut (assistant)
- 1989–1991: Harvard (assistant)
- 1991–1996: Central Connecticut (assistant)
- 1996–2004: Maine (assistant)
- 2004–2014: Maine

Administrative career (AD unless noted)
- 2014–2017: UConn (associate director of development)
- 2017–2018: UConn (director of major gifts)
- 2018–2020: UConn (assistant associate AD for development)
- 2020–present: UConn (assoc. AD for development)

Head coaching record
- Overall: 117–178

Ted Woodward (born November 28, 1963) is an American former college basketball coach. He served as the head men's basketball coach at the University of Maine. He took over the position vacated by John Giannini in 2004, and compiled a 117–178 in 10 seasons at the helm. He has two children with his wife, Linda. He currently serves as the Associate Director of Development for Athletics at the University of Connecticut.

== Head coaching record ==
Record table
Season	Team	Overall	Conference	Standing	Postseason
Maine Black Bears (America East Conference) (2004–2014)
2004–05	Maine	14–15	8–10	T–5th	
2005–06	Maine	12–16	7–9	T–5th	
2006–07	Maine	12–18	7–9	T–4th	
2007–08	Maine	7–23	3–13	T–8th	
2008–09	Maine	9–21	4–12	8th	
2009–10	Maine	19–10	12–4	3rd	
2010–11	Maine	15–15	9–7	3rd	
2011–12	Maine	12–17	6–10	7th	
2012–13	Maine	11–19	6–10	6th	
2013–14	Maine	6–23	4–12	T–7th	
Maine:		117–178 (.397)	64–84 (.432)		
Total:		117–178 (.397)			
