= America East Conference =

US collegiate athletic conference

America East
- Formerly: Eastern College Athletic Conference-North (1979–1988); North Atlantic Conference (1988–1996)
- Association: NCAA
- Founded: 1979
- Commissioner: Brad Walker (since 2021)
- Sports fielded: 18; men's: 8 sports; women's: 10 sports
- Division: Division I
- Subdivision: non-football
- No. of teams: 9
- Headquarters: Boston, Massachusetts, U.S.
- Region: Northeastern United States; Mid-Atlantic (United States)
- Broadcaster: ESPN
- Website: www.americaeast.com

Locations
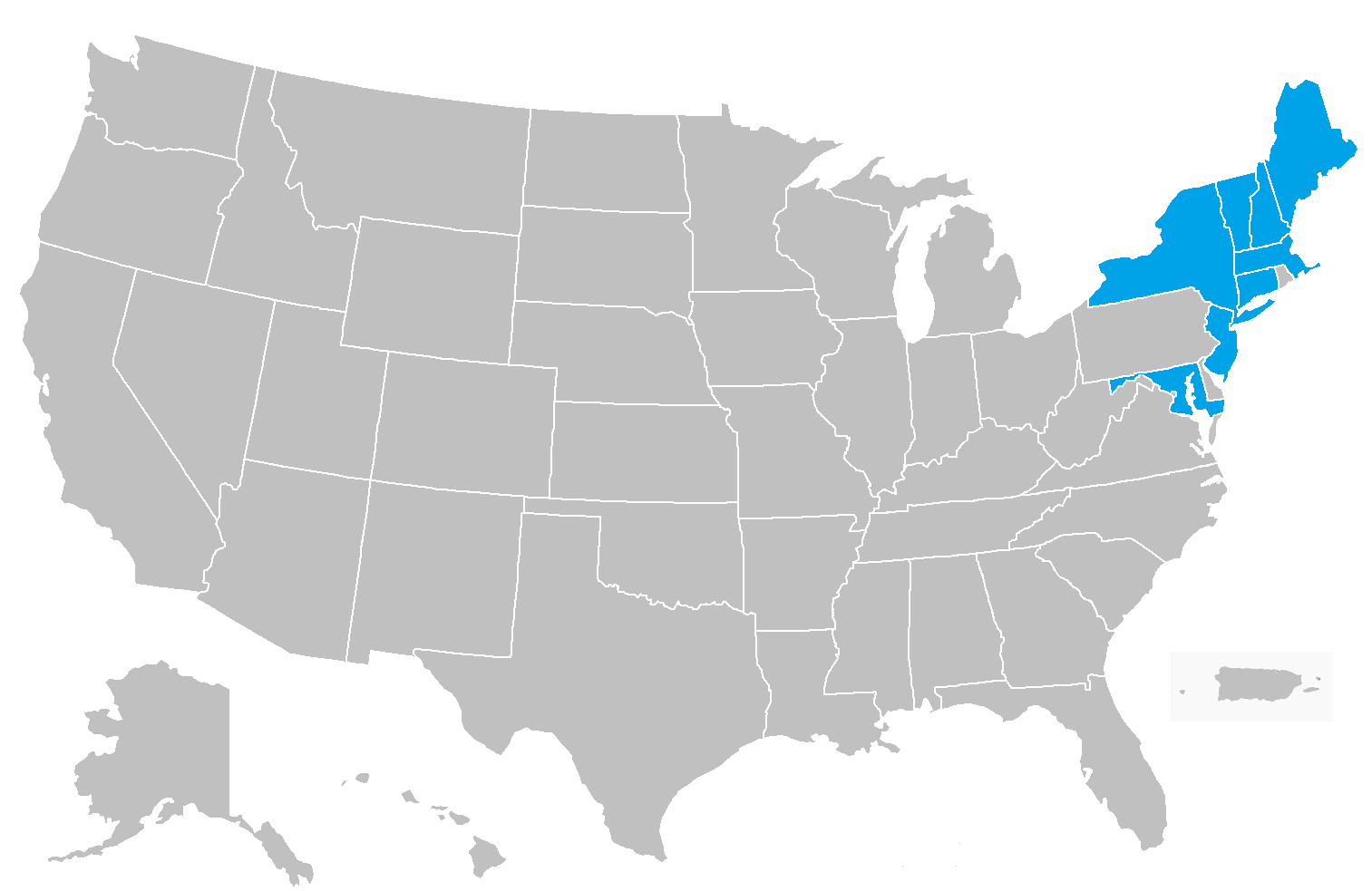

America East Conference
Location of America East members: full member

The America East Conference (AmEast) is a collegiate athletic conference affiliated with NCAA Division I whose members are located in the Northeastern United States. The conference is headquartered in Boston, Massachusetts.

Founded in 1979, the conference has nine core members including eight public research universities, three of which – the University of Maine, the University of New Hampshire, and the University of Vermont – are the flagship universities of their states. Two non-flagship university centers of the State University of New York – the University at Albany and Binghamton University – are in the conference along with UMass Lowell, New Jersey Institute of Technology (NJIT) and Bryant University. Bryant is the latest institution to join the conference in 2022, when Stony Brook University and the University of Hartford departed the conference. It is the only private university among the core members.

The America East Conference sponsors 18 sports (8 men's and 10 women's).

== History ==
The America East Conference was founded as the Eastern College Athletic Conference-North, a men's basketball-only athletic conference, in 1979. The conference was known as the Eastern College Athletic Conference-North from 1979 to 1988 and the North Atlantic Conference from 1988 to 1996. The charter members were the University of Rhode Island, the College of the Holy Cross, Canisius College, Niagara University, Colgate University, Northeastern University, Boston University, the University of Maine, the University of New Hampshire and the University of Vermont. The America East Conference made history during the 2018 NCAA Division I men's basketball tournament on March 16, 2018, when No. 16 seed UMBC defeated No. 1 seed Virginia, marking the first time in men's tournament history that a No. 1 seed had lost to a No. 16 seed.

Many other events have occurred since its formation:

- Rhode Island left in 1980.
- Holy Cross left in 1983.
- Siena College joined in 1984.
- The University of Hartford joined in 1985.
- The conference became an all-sports conference, named the North Atlantic Conference, in the 1988–89 season, only for Canisius, Niagara and Siena to leave after the spring of 1989 to join the Metro Atlantic Athletic Conference (MAAC).
- Colgate left in 1990 to join the Patriot League.
- The University of Delaware and Drexel University joined in 1991.
- Hofstra University joined in 1994.
- Towson University joined in 1995.
- On July 1, 1996, the conference's name changed to its present name, the America East Conference.
- During 2001, Delaware, Drexel, Hofstra and Towson left to join the Colonial Athletic Association (CAA; now the Coastal Athletic Association) while the University at Albany, Binghamton University and Stony Brook University replaced them.
- The University of Maryland, Baltimore County (UMBC) soon joined in 2003.
- Northeastern left in 2005 to join the CAA.
- Boston University left to join the Patriot League on July 1, 2013, while the University of Massachusetts Lowell joined from Division II.
- In 2020, New Jersey Institute of Technology (NJIT) joined from the ASUN Conference.
- In March 2022, Bryant University accepted an invitation to join the America East Conference, leaving the Northeast Conference. This move took effect on July 1.
- On July 1, 2022, Stony Brook University left to join the all-sports Colonial Athletic Association (now the Coastal Athletic Association); it had been a member of the CAA's technically separate football arm, CAA Football, since 2013. Then-current field hockey associate Monmouth left to join the CAA, which sponsors that sport.
- In 2022, the University of Hartford left the conference during its transition down to Division III. At the time this move was announced, the school's departure from the conference had been planned for 2023, but this was eventually changed to 2022.

On May 6, 2021, Hartford's governing board voted to begin the process of transitioning the school from Division I to NCAA Division III. Under the plan, Hartford would formally apply to the NCAA for reclassification in January 2022, stop awarding athletic scholarships to incoming students from 2022–23 forward, and join an as-yet-undetermined D-III conference in 2023 before becoming a full D-III member in 2025–26.

Several media reports indicated that Hartford's last year in the American East Conference would be the 2021–22 season. This was confirmed on June 21, 2022, when the Commonwealth Coast Conference (CCC; now known as the Conference of New England) announced that it would be Hartford's partner in the school's reclassification process, with the Hawks joining that league effective in 2023–24. Hartford played most of its sports in the 2022–23 season as a D-I independent.

At the time, Hartford was the only private university in the conference; this status transferred to Bryant when it joined in July 2022.

On July 20, 2022, the conference announced that Merrimack College would join as a men's lacrosse member for the 2022–23 season.

== Member schools ==
=== Current full members ===
Institution	Location	Founded	Type	Carnegie Classification	Endowment (millions)	Enrollment	Nickname	Joined (Note: Represents the calendar year when fall sports competition begins.)	Colors
University at Albany, SUNY (Note: Also known as the State University of New York at Albany.) (UAlbany)	Albany, New York	1844	Public	R1	$197.3	17,426	Great Danes	2001	
Binghamton University (Note: Also known as the State University of New York at Binghamton.)	Vestal, New York	1946	Public	R1	$250.7	18,652	Bearcats	2001	
Bryant University	Smithfield, Rhode Island	1863	Private	Spec/Bus	$249.3	4,053	Bulldogs	2022	
University of Maine	Orono, Maine	1865	Public	R1	$442.2	11,601	Black Bears	1979	
University of Maryland, Baltimore County (UMBC)	Catonsville, Maryland	1966	Public	R1	$179.1	13,530	Retrievers	2003	
University of Massachusetts Lowell (UMass Lowell)	Lowell, Massachusetts	1894	Public	R1	$200.0	16,826	River Hawks	2013	
University of New Hampshire (UNH)	Durham, New Hampshire	1866	Public	R1	$1,060	13,041	Wildcats	1979	
New Jersey Institute of Technology (NJIT)	Newark, New Jersey	1881	Public	R1	$211.0	12,309	Highlanders	2020	
University of Vermont	Burlington, Vermont	1791	Public	R1	$896.0	14,425	Catamounts	1979	

=== Former full members ===
Institution	Location	Founded	Type	Nickname	Joined (Note: Represents the calendar year when fall sports competition begins.)	Left (Note: Represents the calendar year when spring sports competition ends.)	Colors	Current conference
Boston University	Boston, Massachusetts	1839	Nonsectarian (Note: Historically affiliated with the United Methodist Church.)	Terriers	1979	2013		Patriot
Canisius College (Note: Currently known as Canisius University since 2023.)	Buffalo, New York	1870	Catholic (Jesuit)	Golden Griffins	1979	1989		Metro
Colgate University	Hamilton, New York	1819	Nonsectarian	Raiders	1979	1990		Patriot
University of Delaware	Newark, Delaware	1743	Private & Public	Fightin'; Blue Hens	1991	2001		Conf. USA (CUSA)
Drexel University	Philadelphia, Pennsylvania	1891	Nonsectarian	Dragons	1991	2001		Coastal (CAA)
University of Hartford	West Hartford, Connecticut	1877	Nonsectarian	Hawks	1984 (Note: The Hartford men's basketball team joined the America East a year after it became a full member for other sports (1985–86).)	2022		C. New England (CNE) (Note: Currently an NCAA Division III athletic conference.)
Hofstra University	Hempstead, New York	1935	Nonsectarian	Pride	1994	2001		Coastal (CAA)
College of the Holy Cross	Worcester, Massachusetts	1843	Catholic (Jesuit)	Crusaders	1979	1983		Patriot
Niagara University	Niagara University, New York (Note: The Niagara campus is a census-designated place and postal entity within the town of Lewiston.)	1856	Catholic (Vincentians)	Purple Eagles	1979	1989		Metro
Northeastern University	Boston, Massachusetts	1898	Nonsectarian	Huskies	1979	2005		Coastal (CAA)
University of Rhode Island	Kingston, Rhode Island	1888	Public	Rams	1979	1980		Atlantic 10 (A-10)
Siena College (Note: Currently known as Siena University since 2025.)	Loudonville, New York	1937	Catholic (Franciscan)	Saints	1984	1989		Metro
Stony Brook University (Note: Also known as the State University of New York at Stony Brook.)	Stony Brook, New York	1957	Public	Seawolves	2001	2022		Coastal (CAA)
Towson University	Towson, Maryland	1866	Public	Tigers	1995	2001		Coastal (CAA)

=== Former associate members ===
Ten schools have had single-sport membership in the past. Three of these, Fairfield, Monmouth, and Providence, moved their America East sports into their all-sports conferences. Another such school, NJIT, left when it joined a conference that sponsored its America East sport, but returned as a full member in July 2020 (by which time the AmEast had dropped that sport). Pacific dropped its America East sport following the 2018–19 academic year due to budget cuts. Merrimack College dropped its America East sport following the 2023–24 academic year when the school joined the MAAC. Both Stanford and Cal moved their America East sports into the ACC following the 2023–24 academic year when both of the schools joined the conference.

Institution	Location	Founded	Nickname	Joined (Note: Represents the calendar year when fall sports competition begins.)	Left (Note: Represents the calendar year when spring sports competition ends.)	Colors	AmEast sport(s)	Primary conference	Conference in former AmEast sport(s)
Fairfield University	Fairfield, Connecticut	1942	Stags	2007	2015		Field hockey	Metro	Coastal (CAA)
Merrimack College	North Andover, Massachusetts	1947	Warriors	2022	2024		Men's lacrosse	Metro	
Monmouth University	West Long Branch, New Jersey	1933	Hawks	2019	2022		Field hockey	Coastal (CAA)	
New Jersey Institute of Technology (NJIT)	Newark, New Jersey	1881	Highlanders	2013	2015		Women's tennis	America East (AmEast)	Southland (SLC)
Providence College	Providence, Rhode Island	1917	Friars	2010	2014		Women's volleyball	Big East	
Quinnipiac University	Hamden, Connecticut	1929	Bobcats	2001	2005		Men's lacrosse	Metro	
Stanford University	Stanford, California	1891	Cardinal	2015	2024		Field hockey	Atlantic Coast (ACC)	
University of California, Davis (UC Davis)	Davis, California	1905	Aggies	2015	2025		Field hockey	Mountain West (MW)	Mountain Pacific (MPSF)
University of California, Berkeley	Berkeley, California	1868	Golden Bears	2015	2024		Field hockey	Atlantic Coast (ACC)	
University of the Pacific	Stockton, California	1851	Tigers	2015	2019		Field hockey	West Coast (WCC)	N/A (Note: Pacific discontinued its field hockey team at the end of the 2019 spring season (2018−19 school year).)
Virginia Military Institute (VMI)	Lexington, Virginia	1839	Keydets	2017	2026		Men's swimming & diving	Southern (SoCon)	NEC
Virginia Military Institute (VMI)	Lexington, Virginia	1839	Keydets	2017	2026		Women's swimming & diving	Southern (SoCon)	NEC

=== Membership timeline ===
Full member (all sports) Full member (non-football) Associate member (basketball only) Associate member (list sports) Other Conference Other Conference

== Facilities ==
School	Soccer stadium	Capacity	Basketball arena	Capacity	Baseball field	Capacity	Lacrosse facility	Capacity
Albany	Bob Ford Field at Tom & Mary Casey Stadium	8,500	SEFCU Arena	4,538	Varsity Field	—N/a	John Fallon Field; Bob Ford Field at Tom & Mary Casey Stadium	2,500; 8,500
Binghamton	Bearcats Sports Complex	2,534	Binghamton University Events Center	5,142	Baseball Complex	1,000	Bearcats Sports Complex	2,534
Bryant	Beirne Stadium	5,500	Chace Athletic Center	2,700	Conaty Park	500	Beirne Stadium	5,500
Maine	Mahaney Diamond	4,400	Cross Insurance Center	8,000	Mahaney Diamond	4,400	Non-lacrosse school	
New Hampshire	Wildcat Stadium	11,015	Lundholm Gym	3,500	Non-baseball school		Non-lacrosse school	
NJIT	Lubetkin Field at Mal Simon Stadium	1,000	Wellness and Events Center	3,500	Yogi Berra Stadium	5,000	Lubetkin Field at Mal Simon Stadium	1,000
UMass Lowell	Cushing Field Complex	N/A	Tsongas Center; Costello Athletic Center	6,495; 2,100	Edward A. LeLacheur Park	4,767	Cushing Field Complex	N/A
UMBC	Retriever Soccer Park	1,500	Chesapeake Employers Insurance Arena	5,000	The Baseball Factory Field at UMBC	1,000	UMBC Stadium	4,500
Vermont	Virtue Field	2,600	Patrick Gym	3,228	Non-baseball school		Virtue Field	2,600

== Commissioner Cup ==
The Commissioner Cup is awarded annually to the best athletic program in the conference.

Commissioner Cup Championships by School
Boston	12
Delaware	10
Albany	9
Binghamton	2
Stony Brook	2
Bryant	1
Vermont	1

Year	Winner	Runner-up
2026	Vermont	Bryant
2025	Bryant	Albany
2024	Binghamton	Albany
2024	Binghamton	Albany
2022	Albany	Vermont
2021	Stony Brook	Albany
2020	Not awarded	
2019	Stony Brook	Albany
2018	Albany	Stony Brook
2017	Albany	Stony Brook
2016	Albany	Stony Brook
2015	Albany	Stony Brook
2014	Albany	Stony Brook
2013	Albany	Stony Brook
2012	Boston	Albany

Year	Winner	Runner-up
2011	Boston	Albany
2010	Boston	Stony Brook
2009	Boston	Albany
2008	Boston	Albany
2007	Boston	Albany
2006	Boston	Binghamton
2005	Albany	Boston
2004	Boston	Maine
2003	Boston	New Hampshire
2002	Boston	New Hampshire
2001	Delaware	Hofstra
2000	Delaware	Boston
1999	Delaware	New Hampshire
1998	Delaware	Boston
1997	Delaware	Boston

Year	Winner	Runner-up
1996	Delaware	
1995	Delaware	
1994	Delaware	
1993	Delaware	
1992	Delaware	
1991	Boston	
1990	Boston	

== Sports sponsored ==
The America East Conference sponsors championship competition in eight men's and ten women's NCAA sanctioned sports. The most recent changes to the roster of America East sports were announced in 2016, with the dropping of women's tennis after the 2015–16 season due to a lack of sponsoring teams and the revival of men's swimming and diving effective in the 2017–18 school year.

Teams in America East Conference competition
Sport	Men's	Women's
Baseball	7	–
Basketball	9	9
Cross country	9	9
Field hockey	–	8
Lacrosse	7	7
Soccer	8	9
Softball	–	6
Swimming & Diving	6	7
Track and Field (Indoor)	9	9
Track and Field (outdoor)	9	9
Volleyball	–	6

=== Men's sports ===
Men's sponsored sports by school
School	Baseball	Basketball	Cross Country	Lacrosse	Soccer	Swimming & Diving	Track & Field (indoor)	Track & Field (outdoor)	Total Sports
Albany	Yes	Yes	Yes	Yes	Yes	No	Yes	Yes	7
Binghamton	Yes	Yes	Yes	Yes	Yes	Yes	Yes	Yes	8
Bryant	Yes	Yes	Yes	Yes	Yes	Yes	Yes	Yes	8
Maine	Yes	Yes	Yes	No	No	Yes	Yes	Yes	6
New Hampshire	No	Yes	Yes	No	Yes	No	Yes	Yes	5
NJIT	Yes	Yes	Yes	Yes	Yes	Yes	Yes	Yes	8
UMass Lowell	Yes	Yes	Yes	Yes	Yes	No	Yes	Yes	7
UMBC	Yes	Yes	Yes	Yes	Yes	Yes	Yes	Yes	8
Vermont	No	Yes	Yes	Yes	Yes	No	Yes	Yes	6
Totals	7	9	9	7	8	5	9	9	63

Notes

Men's varsity sports not sponsored by the America East Conference which are played by AmEast schools
School	Fencing	Football	Golf	Ice Hockey	Skiing	Tennis	Volleyball	Wrestling
Albany	No	CAA Football	No	No	No	No	No	No
Binghamton	No	No	NEC	No	No	NEC	No	EIWA
Bryant	No	CAA Football	OVC	No	No	Big South	No	No
Maine	No	CAA Football	No	Hockey East	No	No	No	No
New Hampshire	No	CAA Football	No	Hockey East	EISA	No	No	No
NJIT	MACFA	No	No	No	No	Big South	EIVA	No
UMass Lowell	No	No	No	Hockey East	No	No	No	No
Vermont	No	No	No	Hockey East	EISA	No	No	No

=== Women's sports ===
Women's sponsored sports by school
School	Basketball	Cross Country	Field Hockey	Lacrosse	Soccer	Softball	Swimming & Diving	Track & Field (indoor)	Track & Field (outdoor)	Volleyball	Total Sports
Albany	Yes	Yes	Yes	Yes	Yes	Yes	No	Yes	Yes	Yes	9
Binghamton	Yes	Yes	No	Yes	Yes	Yes	Yes	Yes	Yes	Yes	9
Bryant	Yes	Yes	Yes	Yes	Yes	Yes	Yes	Yes	Yes	Yes	10
Maine	Yes	Yes	Yes	No	Yes	Yes	Yes	Yes	Yes	No	8
New Hampshire	Yes	Yes	Yes	Yes	Yes	No	Yes	Yes	Yes	Yes	9
NJIT	Yes	Yes	No	No	Yes	No	No	Yes	Yes	Yes	6
UMass Lowell	Yes	Yes	Yes	Yes	Yes	Yes	No	Yes	Yes	No	8
UMBC	Yes	Yes	No	Yes	Yes	Yes	Yes	Yes	Yes	Yes	9
Vermont	Yes	Yes	Yes	Yes	Yes	No	Yes	Yes	Yes	No	8
Totals	9	9	6	7	9	6	6	9	9	6	76

Notes

Women's varsity sports not sponsored by the America East Conference which are played by AmEast schools
School	Bowling	Fencing	Golf	Gymnastics	Ice Hockey	Rowing	Skiing	Tennis
Albany	No	No	Metro	No	No	CAA	No	No
Binghamton	No	No	No	No	No	No	No	NEC
Bryant	Independent	No	OVC	No	No	CAA	No	OVC
Maine	No	No	No	No	Hockey East	No	No	No
New Hampshire	No	No	No	EAGL	Hockey East	No	EISA	No
NJIT	No	MACFA	No	No	No	No	No	Big South
Vermont	No	No	No	No	Hockey East	No	EISA	No

== NCAA team championships ==
School	Total	Men	Women	Co-ed	Nickname	Most successful sport (Titles)
Vermont	1	1	0	0	Catamounts	Men’s Soccer

On December 16, 2024, the Vermont men’s soccer team won the Men’s D1 National Soccer Championship, becoming the first America East school to win a national title in a sport sponsored by the conference.

== Men's basketball ==
=== All-time school record by winning percentage ===
This list goes through the 2024–25 season.

No.	Team	Records	Win Pct.	America East Tournament Championships	America East Regular Season Championships	Final Fours	National Championships
1	Albany	1,379–1,082	.560	5	2	0	0
2	Vermont	1,404–1,175	.544	11	14	0	0
3	UMass Lowell	756–688	.524	0	0	0	0
4	Bryant	849–925	.479	1	1	0	0
5	Maine	1,073–1,363	.440	0	0	0	0
6	UMBC	665–951	.412	2	3	0	0
7	Binghamton	760–1,156	.397	1	1	0	0
8	New Hampshire	1,002–1,570	.390	0	1	0	0
9	NJIT	413–715	.366	0	0	0	0

*	Denotes a tie for regular season conference title
†	Denotes game went into overtime

=== List of regular season champions ===
Year	Regular Season Champion	Record
1979–80*	Boston; Northeastern	19–7
1980–81	Northeastern	21–5
1981–82	Northeastern	8–1
1982–83*	Boston; New Hampshire	8–2
1983–84	Northeastern	14–0
1984–85*	Canisius; Northeastern	13–3
1985–86	Northeastern	16–2
1986–87	Northeastern	17–1
1987–88	Siena	16–2
1988–89	Siena	16–1
1989–90*	Northeastern; Boston	9–3
1990–91	Northeastern	8–2
1991–92	Delaware	14–0
1992–93*	Drexel; Northeastern	12–2
1993–94	Drexel	12–2
1994–95	Drexel	12–4
1995–96	Drexel	17–1
1996–97	Boston	17–1
1997–98*	Delaware; Boston	12–6
1998–99*	Delaware; Drexel	15–3
1999–00	Hofstra	16–2
2000–01	Hofstra	16–2
2001–02*	Vermont; Boston	13–3
2002–03	Boston	13–3
2003–04	Boston	17–1
2004–05	Vermont	16–2
2005–06	Albany	13–3
2006–07	Vermont	15–1
2007–08	UMBC	13–3
2008–09*	Binghamton; Vermont	13–3
2009–10	Stony Brook	13–3
2010–11	Vermont	13–3
2011–12	Stony Brook	14–2
2012–13	Stony Brook	14–2
2013–14	Vermont	15–1
2014–15	Albany	15–1
2015–16	Stony Brook	14–2
2016–17	Vermont	16–0
2017–18	Vermont	15–1
2018–19	Vermont	14–2
2019–20	Vermont	14–2
2020–21*	UMBC; Vermont	10–4
2021–22	Vermont	17–1
2022–23	Vermont	14–2
2023–24	Vermont	15–1
2024–25	Bryant	14–2
2025–26	UMBC	14–2

=== List of tournament champions ===
Year	Winner	Score	Opponent	Reggie Lewis Most Outstanding Player	Venue
1980	Holy Cross	81–75	Boston	Ron Perry, Holy Cross	Hart Center (Worcester, MA)
1981	Northeastern	81–79^{†}	Holy Cross	Perry Moss, Northeastern	Cabot Center (Boston, MA)
1982	Northeastern	82–59	Niagara	Perry Moss, Northeastern	Matthews Arena (Boston, MA)
1983	Boston	63–62	Holy Cross	Mike Alexander, Boston University	Case Gym (Boston, MA)
1984	Northeastern	85–75	Canisius	Mark Halsel, Northeastern	Matthews Arena (Boston, MA)
1985	Northeastern	68–67	Boston	Reggie Lewis, Northeastern	Matthews Arena (Boston, MA)
1986	Northeastern	63–54	Boston	Wess Fuller, Northeastern	Matthews Arena (Boston, MA)
1987	Northeastern	71–68	Boston	Reggie Lewis, Northeastern	Matthews Arena (Boston, MA)
1988	Boston	79–68	Niagara	Jeff Timberlake, Boston University	Hartford Civic Center (Hartford, CT)
1989	Siena	68–67	Boston	Marc Brown, Siena	Hartford Civic Center (Hartford, CT)
1990	Boston	75–57	Vermont	Bill Brigham, Boston University	Hartford Civic Center (Hartford, CT)
1991	Northeastern	57–46	Maine	Ron Lacey, Northeastern	Matthews Arena (Boston, MA)
1992	Delaware	92–68	Drexel	Alex Coles, Delaware	Bob Carpenter Center (Newark, DE)
1993	Delaware	67–64	Drexel	Kevin Blackhurst, Delaware	Daskalakis Athletic Center (Philadelphia, PA)
1994	Drexel	86–78	Maine	Malik Rose, Drexel	Daskalakis Athletic Center (Philadelphia, PA)
1995	Drexel	72–52	Northeastern	Malik Rose, Drexel	Daskalakis Athletic Center (Philadelphia, PA)
1996	Drexel	76–67	Boston	Malik Rose, Drexel	Daskalakis Athletic Center (Philadelphia, PA)
1997	Boston	68–61	Drexel	Tunji Awojobi, Boston University	Case Gym (Boston, MA)
1998	Delaware	66–58	Boston	Darryl Presley, Delaware	Bob Carpenter Center (Newark, DE)
1999	Delaware	86–67	Drexel	John Gordon, Delaware	Bob Carpenter Center (Newark, DE)
2000	Hofstra	76–69	Delaware	Speedy Claxton, Hofstra	Hofstra Arena (Hempstead, NY)
2001	Hofstra	68–54	Delaware	Roberto Gittens, Hofstra	Hofstra Arena (Hempstead, NY)
2002	Boston	66–40	Maine	Billy Collins, Boston University	Case Gym (Boston, MA)
2003	Vermont	56–55	Boston	Matt Sheftic, Vermont	Case Gym (Boston, MA)
2004	Vermont	72–53	Maine	Taylor Coppenrath, Vermont	Patrick Gym (Burlington, VT)
2005	Vermont	80–57	Northeastern	Taylor Coppenrath, Vermont	Patrick Gym (Burlington, VT)
2006	Albany	80–67	Vermont	Jamar Wilson, Albany	Recreation and Convocation Center (Albany, NY)
2007	Albany	60–59	Vermont	Jamar Wilson, Albany	Patrick Gym (Burlington, VT)
2008	UMBC	82–65	Hartford	Jay Greene, UMBC	Retriever Activities Center (Catonsville, MD)
2009	Binghamton	61–51	UMBC	D.J. Rivera, Binghamton	Events Center (Vestal, NY)
2010	Vermont	83–70	Boston	Marqus Blakely, Vermont	Patrick Gym (Burlington, VT)
2011	Boston	56–54	Stony Brook	John Holland, Boston University	Agganis Arena (Boston, MA)
2012	Vermont	51–43	Stony Brook	Brian Voelkel, Vermont	Stony Brook Arena (Stony Brook, NY)
2013	Albany	53–49	Vermont	Mike Black, Albany	Patrick Gym (Burlington, VT)
2014	Albany	69–60	Stony Brook	Peter Hooley, Albany	Pritchard Gymnasium (Stony Brook, NY)
2015	Albany	51–50	Stony Brook	Peter Hooley, Albany	SEFCU Arena (Albany, NY)
2016	Stony Brook	80–74	Vermont	Jameel Warney, Stony Brook	Island Federal Credit Union Arena (Stony Brook, NY)
2017	Vermont	56–53	Albany	Anthony Lamb, Vermont	Patrick Gym (Burlington, VT)
2018	UMBC	68–65	Vermont	Jairus Lyles, UMBC	Patrick Gym (Burlington, VT)
2019	Vermont	66–49	UMBC	Anthony Lamb, Vermont	Patrick Gym (Burlington, VT)
2020	Cancelled due to COVID-19 pandemic				
2021	Hartford	64–50	UMass Lowell	Austin Williams, Hartford	Chase Arena (West Hartford, CT)
2022	Vermont	82–43	UMBC	Ben Shungu, Vermont	Patrick Gym (Burlington, VT)
2023	Vermont	72–59	UMass Lowell	Dylan Penn, Vermont	Patrick Gym (Burlington, VT)
2024	Vermont	66–61	UMass Lowell	Shamir Bogues, Vermont	Patrick Gym (Burlington, VT)
2025	Bryant	77–59	Maine	Earl Timberlake, Bryant	Chace Athletic Center (Smithfield, RI)
2026	UMBC	74–59	Vermont	DJ Armstrong Jr., UMBC	Chesapeake Employers Insurance Arena (Catonsville, MD)

=== No. 16 UMBC upset of No. 1 Virginia ===
During the 2018 NCAA tournament, UMBC became the first No. 16 seed to defeat a No. 1 seed in the NCAA men's tournament, beating the Virginia Cavaliers 74–54.

== Women's basketball ==
=== All-time school record by winning percentage ===
No.	Team	Records	Win Pct.	America East Tournament Championships	America East Regular Season Championships	Final Fours	National Championships
1	Maine	705–522	.575	8	15	0	0
2	Albany	624–578	.519	6	4	0	0
3	New Hampshire	583–545	.517	2	1	0	0
4	Vermont	521–493	.514	6	5	0	0
5	Stony Brook	594–602	.497	0	0	0	0
6	Binghamton	504–512	.496	0	0	0	0
7	Hartford	550–596	.480	5	4	0	0
8	UMass Lowell	537–600	.472	0	0	0	0
9	UMBC	520–711	.422	1	1	0	0

*	Denotes a tie for regular season conference title
†	Denotes game went into overtime

=== List of regular season champions ===
Year	Regular Season Champion	Record
1984–85*	New Hampshire; Northeastern	
1985–86	Northeastern	10–2
1986–87	Northeastern	12–2
1987–88*	Boston; Maine	12–2
1988–89	Maine	13–1
1989–90	Maine	11–1
1990–91	Maine	9–1
1991–92	Vermont	14–0
1992–93	Vermont	14–0
1993–94	Maine	12–2
1994–95	Maine	14–2
1995–96	Maine	18–0
1996–97	Maine	17–1
1997–98	Vermont	15–3
1998–99	Maine	17–1
1999–00	Vermont	15–3
2000–01	Delaware	17–1
2001–02	Vermont	14–2
2002–03	Maine	16–0
2003–04	Maine	17–1
2004–05	Maine	16–2
2005–06	Hartford	15–1
2006–07	Hartford	15–1
2007–08	Hartford	14–2
2008–09	Boston	16–0
2009–10	Hartford	16–0
2010–11	UMBC	13–3
2011–12	Boston	15–1
2012–13	Albany	16–0
2013–14	Albany	15–1
2014–15*	Albany; Maine	14–2
2015–16*	Albany; Maine	15–1
2016–17	New Hampshire	15–1
2017–18	Maine	13–3
2018–19	Maine	15–1

=== List of tournament champions ===
Year	Winner	Score	Opponent	Most Outstanding Player	Venue
1985	Northeastern	73–59	Maine	N/A	
1986	Northeastern	62–55	Boston	N/A	
1987	Northeastern	55–48	Maine	N/A	
1988	Boston	66–62	Maine	N/A	
1989	Boston	60–54	Northeastern	N/A	
1990	Maine	64–54	Boston	Rachel Bouchard, Maine	
1991	Maine	79–64	Vermont	Rachel Bouchard, Maine	
1992	Vermont	70–50	Maine	Sharon Bay, Vermont	
1993	Vermont	62–45	Maine	Sharon Bay, Vermont	
1994	Vermont	53–51	Northeastern	Sheri Turnbull, Vermont	
1995	Maine	70–59	Northeastern	Cindy Blodgett, Maine	
1996	Maine	88–55	Vermont	Cindy Blodgett, Maine	
1997	Maine	92–70	Vermont	Cindy Blodgett, Maine	
1998	Maine	81–80	Vermont	Cindy Blodgett, Maine	Alfond Arena (Orono, ME)
1999	Northeastern	57–55	Maine	Tesha Tinsley, Northeastern	Patrick Gym (Burlington, VT)
2000	Vermont	77–50	Maine	Karalyn Church, Vermont	Patrick Gym (Burlington, VT)
2001	Delaware	69–64	Vermont	Cindy Johnson, Delaware	Patrick Gym (Burlington, VT)
2002	Hartford	60–57	Stony Brook	Kenitra Johnson, Hartford	Chase Arena (Hartford, CT)
2003	Boston	69–65	Maine	Katie Terhune, Boston University	Chase Arena (Hartford, CT)
2004	Maine	68–43	Boston	Cindy Blodgett, Maine	Chase Arena (Hartford, CT)
2005	Hartford	52–50	Boston	Erika Messam, Hartford	Chase Arena (Hartford, CT)
2006	Hartford	75–56	Boston	Erika Messam, Hartford	Chase Arena (Hartford, CT)
2007	UMBC	48–46	Hartford	Amanda Robinson, UMBC	Binghamton University Events Center (Binghamton, NY)
2008	Hartford	61–45	Boston	Lisa Etienne, Hartford	Chase Arena (Hartford, CT)
2009	Vermont	74–66	Boston	Courtnay Pilypaitis, Vermont	Chase Arena (Hartford, CT)
2010	Vermont	55–50	Hartford	Courtnay Pilypaitis, Vermont	Chase Arena (Hartford, CT)
2011	Hartford	65–53	Boston	Alex Hall, Hartford	Agganis Arena (Boston, MA)
2012	Albany	69–61	UMBC	Ebone Henry, Albany	SEFCU Arena (Albany, NY)
2013	Albany	61–52	Hartford	Megan Craig, Albany	SEFCU Arena (Albany, NY)
2014	Albany	70–46	Stony Brook	Shereesha Richards, Albany	SEFCU Arena (Albany, NY)
2015	Albany	84–75	Hartford	Shereesha Richards, Albany	SEFCU Arena (Albany, NY)
2016	Albany	59–58	Maine	Shereesha Richards, Albany	SEFCU Arena (Albany, NY)
2017	Albany	66–50	Maine	Imani Tate, Albany	SEFCU Arena (Albany, NY)
2018	Maine	74–65	Hartford	Blanca Millán, Maine	Cross Insurance Center (Bangor, ME)

== Soccer ==
=== 2024 NCAA Championship win by the Vermont Catamounts ===
On December 16th 2024, the University of Vermont Catamounts Men's Soccer team defeated the Marshall University Thundering Herd in the 2024 NCAA Division I men's soccer tournament championship game to claim the 2024 College Cup. This marks the first national championship by any America East Conference team in league history.

== See also ==
- List of America East Conference champions
- America East Conference baseball tournament
