= Chase Arena at Reich Family Pavilion =

Arena in West Hartford, Connecticut, US

Chase Family Arena at Reich Family Pavilion
- Interactive map of Chase Family Arena at Reich Family Pavilion
- Former names: Sports Center (1990–1998); Chase Family Arena (1998–2004)
- Location: Hawk Drive, Hartford, Connecticut, USA
- Owner: University of Hartford
- Capacity: Basketball: 4,017

Construction
- Opened: January 25, 1990

Tenants
- Hartford Hawks (NCAA) (1990–present); Connecticut Pride (CBA) (1996–1997)

Chase Family Arena at Reich Family Pavilion, commonly called the Sports Center or the Reich Family Pavilion, is a 4,017-seat multi-purpose arena in Hartford, Connecticut. Home to the University of Hartford Hawks men's and women's basketball teams, the arena opened on January 25, 1990, and was dedicated to the Chase family and the Reich family, both of West Hartford, in 1998 and 2004, respectively. It hosted the 2010 and 2011 America East Conference men's and women's basketball tournaments. In 2015 the men's basketball locker room was expanded and refurbished.

== Notable games ==
On January 25, 1990, the Hartford men's basketball team officially opened what was originally known as the Sports Center with the largest crowd in the arena's history as 4,161 attendees watched the Hawks christen their new arena with a 63–61 win over Siena.

March 9, 2002, the Hartford women's basketball team knocked off Stony Brook 50–47 in the America East Tournament Championship, to claim their first conference championship and first NCAA tournament appearance.

December 22, 2012, the Hartford women's basketball team hosted the #2-ranked UConn Huskies in front of a sellout crowd of 3,508. UConn was playing its first in-state road game in 20 years and its first at Chase Arena since a 57–43 win on Dec. 23, 1990. UConn won the contest, 102–45.

On March 13, 2021, the Hartford men's basketball team defeated UMass-Lowell, 64-50, to win the 2021 America East Tournament. It was the men's team's first conference tournament championship and secured its first NCAA Division I tournament appearance. The game was closed to the public due to ongoing COVID-19 restrictions.

== Events ==
President Obama at Chase Arena

- President Barack Obama gave a speech on April 8, 2013, at Chase Family Arena.

=== America East Conference tournament ===
- Chase Arena hosted the America East Conference women's basketball tournament from 2002 to 2006, and then returning in 2008 and continuing in 2010. In 2012 the preliminary rounds of the tournament were hosted at the arena.

=== Connecticut high school basketball ===
- The Connecticut Class LL boys basketball state semifinal between East Catholic High School and Hillhouse High School was held on March 15, 2017
- The Connecticut Division II boys basketball state semifinal between Immaculate High School and Glastonbury High School was held on March 14, 2018

== See also ==
- List of NCAA Division I basketball arenas
