= Binghamton University Events Center =

Multipurpose arena in Binghamton, New York

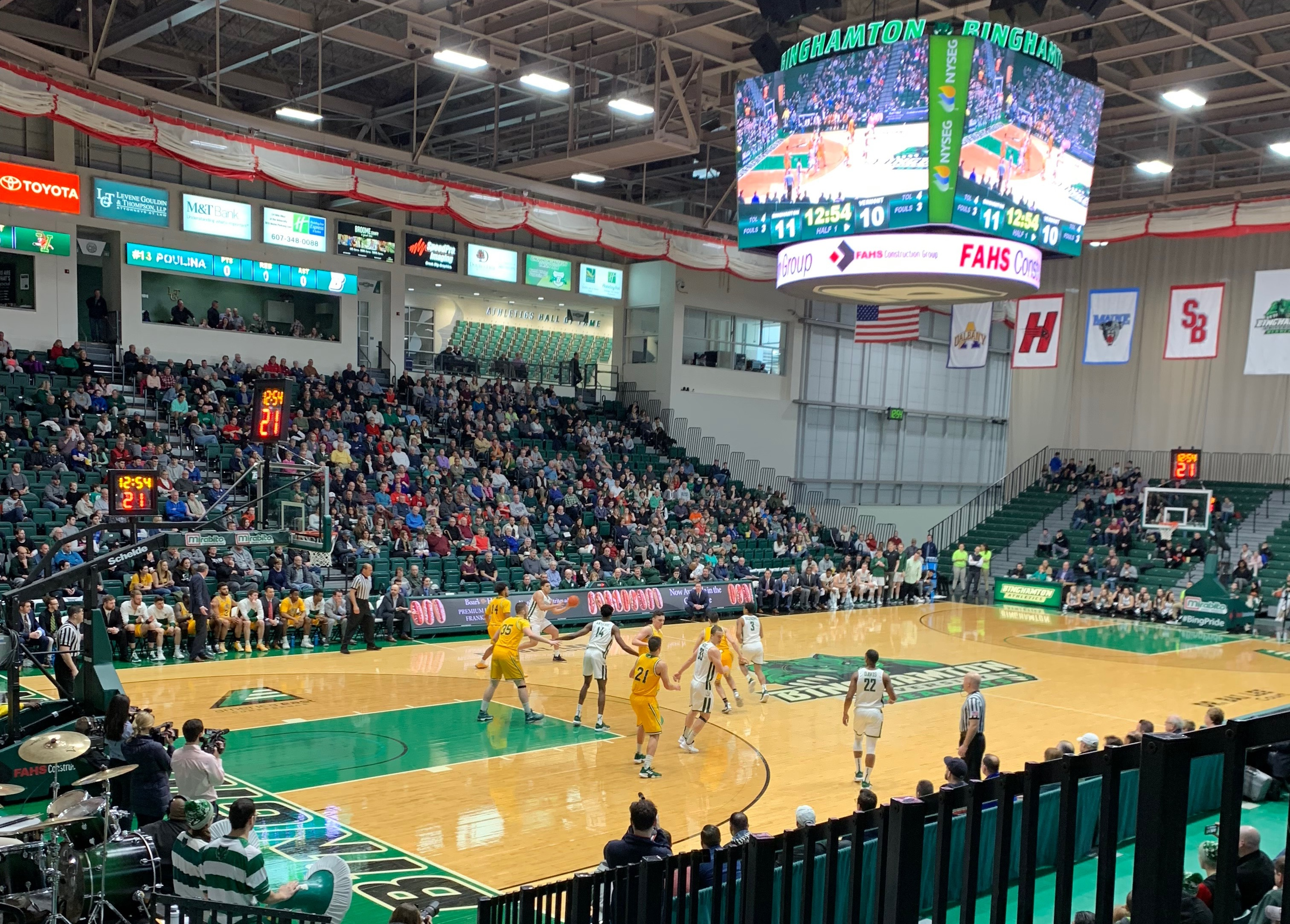
- Interactive map of Binghamton University Events Center
- Former names: Soccer Field; TD
- Location: 4400 Vestal Parkway East, Vestal, NY Official Address: Events Center, PO Box 6000, Binghamton, NY 13902-6000
- Coordinates: 42°5′36″N 75°58′19″W
- Owner: Binghamton University
- Operator: Department of Athletics (Contact: Ze Zeon, Associate Director of Athletics)
- Capacity: 5,142 (basketball); 5,469 (half-house); 7,753 (end stage/maximum)
- Surface: Mondo Rubber Athletic Flooring (Track); Robbins All-Star Plus (Basketball Court)

Construction
- Groundbreaking: June 7, 2000
- Opened: January 31, 2004
- Cost: $33.1 million ($56.4 million in 2025 dollars)
- Architects: Einhorn, Yaffee, and Prescott
- General contractor: Welliver McGuire Inc.

Tenant
- Binghamton Bearcats (America East Conference)

Binghamton University Events Center is the premier Division I Athletics and multipurpose facility at Binghamton University. The arena opened in 2004 and is adjacent to the Bearcat Sports Complex. It is home to the Binghamton Bearcats Division I Intercollegiate Athletic Program and can seat 5,142 patrons for home games, and over 8,000 for other large-scale events. It has hosted the 2005, 2006, and 2008 America East Conference men's basketball tournaments; the 2007 America East women's tournament as well as the first round and quarterfinal of the 2018 WBI tournament. The Events Center was host to the 2009 America East Conference Championship game when the Bearcats defeated UMBC to make March Madness. The facility has also hosted commencements and concerts such as Bob Dylan, Green Day, Incubus, Ludacris, Foo Fighters, Drake and Harry Connick Jr. The arena contains 53,000 square feet (160 feet by 320 feet) of space.

== History ==
The Events Center was built to create a Division I athletic and multipurpose facility in an addition to the West Gym. The majority of sports and athletic administration are located at the Events Center with the exception of certain sports, such as Swimming & Diving, Volleyball and Wrestling. The Events Center is surrounded by ample parking facilities, athletic fields, the new Bearcat Sports Complex for soccer and lacrosse competitions and tennis courts. In December 2015, it was announced that the events center would host the NYSPHAA State Boys Basketball Championships from 2017–2019.

== See also ==
- List of NCAA Division I basketball arenas
