= Broadview Center =

Multi-purpose arena in Guilderland, New York, U.S.

- "Home of The Great Danes"
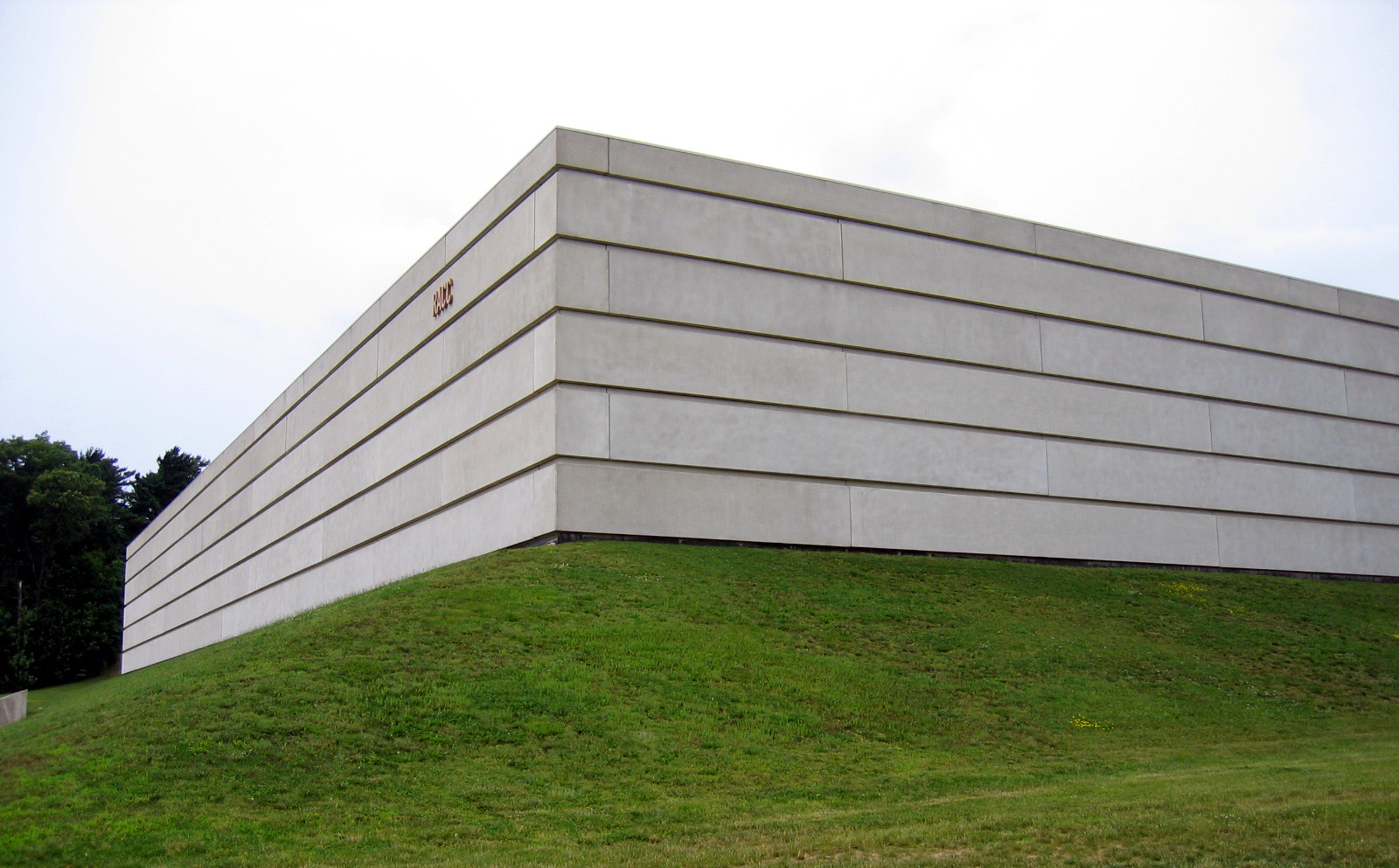
- Interactive map of Broadview Center
- Former names: Recreation and Convocation Center (RACC) (1992–2006); SEFCU Arena (2006-2023)
- Address: 1400 Washington Avenue; Albany, New York 12222 (Note: The building's physical location is in Guilderland. Mail to the building for delivery by the United States Postal Service (USPS) is addressed to 1400 Washington Avenue, Albany, New York 12222 from which it is delivered to the arena by University at Albany mail services. The building is physically located in ZIP code 12203, which is identified by the USPS as Albany but includes parts of both Albany and Guilderland.)
- Location: East University Drive, Guilderland, New York, U.S.
- Coordinates: 42°40′54″N 73°49′42″W
- Owner: University at Albany
- Operator: University at Albany
- Capacity: 3,800
- Surface: Hardwood

Construction
- Groundbreaking: 1990
- Opened: April 1992
- Cost: $11 million ($25.2 million in 2025 dollars)
- Architect: Mesick Cohen Waite Architects
- General contractor: U.W. Marx Construction

Tenants
- UAlbany Great Danes basketball team New York Buzz (2009–2010); New York Sportimes (2011, 2013)

The Broadview Center, formerly known as the SEFCU Arena, is a 3,800-seat multi-purpose arena in Guilderland, New York, United States. It is home to the University at Albany men's and women's Great Danes basketball teams. It is most notable for hosting the 2006 America East Conference men's basketball tournament championship, in which the Great Danes defeated Vermont, to earn their first bid into the NCAA Men's Division I Basketball Championship. The arena additionally hosted the 2009 America East men's basketball tournament, and is also a venue for the university's graduate commencement ceremonies. It can also be formatted as a concert venue or to accommodate trade shows and conventions.

The arena opened in 1992, as the Recreation and Convocation Center (RACC), as part of UAlbany's transition from Division III to Division I. The name of SEFCU Arena was adopted on November 1, 2006, when UAlbany entered a 10-year naming rights deal with the State Employees Federal Credit Union. The arena is located behind the Physical Education building, which separates it from University Field, and sits adjacent to Bob Ford Field.

Broadview Federal Credit Union was formed in 2022, when SEFCU and CAP COM merged. In 2022 it was announced the arena would be receiving $12 million in renovations and upgrades that was scheduled to be completed by November 2023. As part of Broadview Federal Credit Union's rebranding effort and the University at Albany's renovation, the credit union and university announced that SEFCU Arena would be known as the Broadview Center.

== See also ==
- List of NCAA Division I basketball arenas
