= Pritchard Gymnasium =

Multi-purpose gymnasium in Stony Brook, New York

- Pritchard Gymnasium during the 2018 America East Volleyball Tournament
- Interactive map of Pritchard Gymnasium
- Former names: Stony Brook Gym (1964–1991)
- Location: John S. Toll Drive, Stony Brook, New York, 11790
- Coordinates: 40.917238°N 73.124638°W
- Owner: State University of New York
- Operator: Stony Brook University
- Capacity: 1,970
- Field size: 20,000 sq ft (1,900 m^{2})

Construction
- Opened: 1964
- Renovated: 2008

Tenant
- Stony Brook Seawolves (1969–present)

Website
- www.stonybrookathletics.com

Pritchard Gymnasium is a 1,970-seat, 20,000 square-foot multi-purpose gymnasium located within the Stony Brook Sports Complex in Stony Brook, New York. The gym opened in 1964 and is the current home for the Stony Brook Seawolves volleyball team. It was formerly the home of Stony Brook's men's and women's basketball teams.

== History ==
Pritchard Gymnasium opened in 1964. At the time, it was known simply as the Stony Brook Gym.

The gym served as the original home for Stony Brook men's basketball from 1969 to 1990, until the Stony Brook Arena was opened in 1990. The Gymnasium underwent a $1.2 million renovation in the summer of 2008 and reopened in time for the 2009 Stony Brook women's volleyball season. The Gymnasium has been the home for several concerts, including Phish, The Notorious B.I.G., Primus, Red Hot Chili Peppers, Siouxsie and the Banshees, The Clash, and U2.

In October 1991, the gym was formally designated the Pritchard Gymnasium.

Stony Brook men's basketball returned to the Pritchard Gymnasium beginning in 2008 as the Stony Brook Arena underwent renovations. The America East Tournament Finals were held at Pritchard Gym in 2014. During the time when Stony Brook played home games at Pritchard, it played two postseason games at the otherwise dormant Stony Brook Arena: a 2010 NIT game against Illinois, and the 2012 America East Tournament Finals against Vermont, in order to meet minimum capacity requirements. From 2011 to 2014, the Stony Brook's men's basketball team had a 37–3 record at home. The team moved back into the Stony Brook Arena, which reopened as the Island Federal Credit Union Arena, in the fall of 2014.

The Gymnasium hosted the 2018 America East Tournament in volleyball, where No. 1 seed Stony Brook won the finals on their home court to advance to their second straight NCAA Tournament.
