= 2013–14 Robert Morris Colonials men's basketball team =

American college basketball season

2013–14 Robert Morris Colonials men's basketball

NEC Regular Season Champions

NIT Second round vs. Belmont, L 71–82
- Conference: Northeast Conference
- Record: 22–14 (14–2 NEC)
- Head coach: Andrew Toole (4th season)
- Assistant coaches: Joe Gallo; Robby Pridgen; Michael Byrnes
- Home arena: Charles L. Sewall Center

2013–14 Northeast Conference men's basketball standings
| | Conf. | | | | Overall |
| Team | W | | L | PCT | W | | L | PCT |
|---|---|---|---|---|---|---|---|---|
| Robert Morris | 14 | – | 2 | .875 | 22 | – | 14 | .611 |
| Wagner | 12 | – | 4 | .750 | 19 | – | 12 | .613 |
| Bryant | 10 | – | 6 | .625 | 18 | – | 14 | .563 |
| St. Francis Brooklyn | 9 | – | 7 | .563 | 18 | – | 14 | .563 |
| Mount St. Mary's † | 9 | – | 7 | .563 | 16 | – | 17 | .485 |
| Central Connecticut | 7 | – | 9 | .438 | 11 | – | 19 | .367 |
| Saint Francis | 7 | – | 9 | .438 | 10 | – | 21 | .323 |
| Fairleigh Dickinson | 6 | – | 10 | .375 | 10 | – | 21 | .323 |
| LIU Brooklyn | 4 | – | 12 | .250 | 9 | – | 20 | .310 |
| Sacred Heart | 2 | – | 14 | .125 | 5 | – | 26 | .161 |
† 2014 NEC tournament winner

The 2013–14 Robert Morris Colonials men's basketball team represented Robert Morris University during the 2013–14 NCAA Division I men's basketball season. The Colonials, led by fourth year head coach Andrew Toole, played their home games at the Charles L. Sewall Center and were members of the Northeast Conference. They finished the season 22–14, 14–2 in NEC play to win the regular season NEC championship. They advanced to the championship game of the NEC tournament where they lost to Mount St. Mary's. As a regular season conference champion who failed to win their conference tournament, they earned an automatic bid to the National Invitation Tournament. In the NIT, they defeated St. John's in the first round before losing in the second round to Belmont.

== Roster ==
| Number | Name | Position | Height | Weight | Year | Hometown |
|---|---|---|---|---|---|---|
| 1 | Mike McFadden | Forward | 6–8 | 220 | Senior | Newark, New Jersey |
| 2 | Britton Lee | Guard | 5–11 | 180 | Freshman | Philadelphia, Pennsylvania |
| 3 | Kavon Stewart | Guard | 6–0 | 180 | Freshman | Paterson, New Jersey |
| 4 | David Appolon | Guard | 6–4 | 190 | Junior | Philadelphia, Pennsylvania |
| 5 | Anthony Myers-Pate | Guard | 5–11 | 170 | Senior | Washington, D.C. |
| 10 | Desjuan Newton | Guard | 6–2 | 185 | Junior | Seattle, Washington |
| 11 | Jeremiah Worthem | Forward | 6–6 | 215 | Freshman | Philadelphia, Pennsylvania |
| 12 | Charles Oliver | Guard | 6–3 | 190 | Junior | Scotch Plains, New Jersey |
| 15 | Karvel Anderson | Guard | 6–2 | 190 | Senior | Elkhart, Indiana |
| 45 | Stephan Hawkins | Forward | 6–9 | 205 | Sophomore | Gary, Indiana |
| 22 | Lucky Jones | Guard/Forward | 6–5 | 210 | Junior | Newark, New Jersey |
| 24 | Aaron Tate | Forward | 6–5 | 220 | Sophomore | New Bern, North Carolina |
| 33 | Evan Grey | Guard | 6–3 | 180 | Sophomore | Columbia, Maryland |

== Schedule ==
| Date time, TV | Rank^{#} | Opponent^{#} | Result | Record | Site (attendance) city, state |
Exhibition
| 10/28/2013*; 7:00 pm | | California (PA) | W 64–58 | | Charles L. Sewall Center; Moon Township, PA |
Regular season
| 11/09/2013*; 7:00 pm | | Savannah State | W 86–66 | 1–0 | Charles L. Sewall Center (1,124); Moon Township, PA |
| 11/12/2013*; 7:00 pm | | at Lafayette | W 90–81 | 2–0 | Kirby Sports Center (1,605); Easton, PA |
| 11/14/2013*; 7:00 pm | | at Eastern Michigan; Keightley Classic | L 64–69 | 2–1 | Bowen Field House (793); Ypsilanti, MI |
| 11/17/2013*; 7:00 pm | | at No. 1 Kentucky; Keightley Classic | L 49–87 | 2–2 | Rupp Arena (21,600); Lexington, KY |
| 11/21/2013*; 7:00 pm | | Texas–Arlington; Keightley Classic | W 88–81 | 3–2 | Charles L. Sewall Center (1,166); Moon Township, PA |
| 11/23/2013*; 7:00 pm | | at Cleveland State; Keightley Classic | L 74–87 | 3–3 | Wolstein Center (2,755); Cleveland, OH |
| 11/26/2013*; 7:00 pm | | at Buffalo | L 66–81 | 3–4 | Turner Battle (2,539); Buffalo, NY |
| 11/30/2013*; 12:00 pm | | at Delaware | L 67–86 | 3–5 | Bob Carpenter Center (1,823); Newark, DE |
| 12/04/2013*; 7:45 pm | | at Youngstown State | L 76–84 | 3–6 | Beeghly Center (N/A); Youngstown, OH |
| 12/07/2013*; 7:00 pm | | Toledo | L 77–80 | 3–7 | Charles L. Sewall Center (804); Moon Township, PA |
| 12/14/2013*; 2:00 pm | | at Duquesne | W 67–63 | 4–7 | A. J. Palumbo Center (2,515); Pittsburgh, PA |
| 12/18/2013*; 7:00 pm | | Campbell | W 72–61 | 5–7 | Charles L. Sewall Center (516); Moon Township, PA |
| 12/22/2013*; 1:00 pm | | at Oakland | L 94–100 | 5–8 | Athletics Center O'rena (1,238); Rochester, MI |
| 12/30/2013*; 7:00 pm, ESPNU | | at No. 6 Oklahoma State | L 66–92 | 5–9 | Gallagher-Iba Arena (9,514); Stillwater, OK |
| 01/04/2014*; 5:30 pm | | at Alabama | L 56–64 | 5–10 | Coleman Coliseum (10,125); Tuscaloosa, AL |
| 01/09/2014; 7:00 pm | | at Sacred Heart | W 79–70 | 6–10 (1–0) | William H. Pitt Center (N/A); Fairfield, CT |
| 01/11/2014; 1:00 pm | | at Bryant | W 71–67 | 7–10 (2–0) | Chace Athletic Center (679); Smithfield, RI |
| 01/16/2014; 7:00 pm | | Saint Francis (PA) | W 73–68 | 8–10 (3–0) | Charles L. Sewall Center (1,221); Moon Township, PA |
| 01/18/2014; 2:00 pm | | Mount St. Mary's | W 77–69 | 9–10 (4–0) | Knott Arena (1,499); Emmitsburg, MD |
| 01/23/2014; 7:00 pm | | Sacred Heart | W 91–65 | 10–10 (5–0) | Charles L. Sewall Center (824); Moon Township, PA |
| 01/25/2014; 4:00 pm | | Wagner | W 74–70 | 11–10 (6–0) | Charles L. Sewall Center (1,093); Moon Township, PA |
| 01/30/2014; 7:00 pm | | Bryant | W 79–76 | 12–10 (7–0) | Charles L. Sewall Center (2,454); Moon Township, PA |
| 02/01/2014; 4:00 pm | | Central Connecticut | L 73–74 | 12–11 (7–1) | Charles L. Sewall Center (1,473); Moon Township, PA |
| 02/06/2014; 7:00 pm | | at LIU Brooklyn | W 65–56 | 13–11 (8–1) | Wellness, Recreation & Athletics Center (1,145); Brooklyn, NY |
| 02/08/2014; 2:00 pm | | at St. Francis Brooklyn | W 72–50 | 14–11 (9–1) | Generoso Pope Athletic Complex (574); Brooklyn, NY |
| 02/13/2014; 7:00 pm | | at Saint Francis (PA) | W 66–60 | 15–11 (10–1) | DeGol Arena (1,119); Loretto, PA |
| 02/15/2014; 7:00 pm | | Mount St. Mary's | W 69–61 | 16–11 (11–1) | Charles L. Sewall Center (2,062); Moon Township, PA |
| 02/20/2014; 7:00 pm | | LIU Brooklyn | W 73–64 | 17–11 (12–1) | Charles L. Sewall Center (1,299); Moon Township, PA |
| 02/22/2014; 4:00 pm | | St. Francis Brooklyn | W 71–70 ^{OT} | 18–11 (13–1) | Charles L. Sewall Center (2,381); Moon Township, PA |
| 02/27/2014; 7:00 pm | | at Fairleigh Dickinson | W 69–64 | 19–11 (14–1) | Rothman Center (827); Teaneck, NJ |
| 03/01/2014; 4:00 pm | | at Wagner | L 48–59 | 19–12 (14–2) | Spiro Sports Center (2,113); Staten Island, NY |
Northeast Conference tournament
| 03/05/2014; 7:00 pm | | Fairleigh Dickinson; Quarterfinals | W 60–53 | 20–12 | Charles L. Sewall Center (1,117); Moon Township, PA |
| 03/08/2014; 2:00 pm, MSG+/FCS | | Saint Francis (PA); Semifinals | W 60–57 | 21–12 | Charles L. Sewall Center (1,739); Moon Township, PA |
| 03/11/2014; 7:00 pm, ESPN2 | | Mount St. Mary's; Championship | L 71–88 | 21–13 | Charles L. Sewall Center (3,024); Moon Township, PA |
NIT
| 03/18/2014*; 7:00 pm, ESPNU | No. (8) | at (1) St. John's; First round | W 89–78 | 22–13 | Carnesecca Arena (1,027); Queens, NY |
| 03/21/2014*; 9:30 pm, ESPNU | No. (8) | at (5) Belmont; Second round | L 71–82 | 22–14 | Curb Event Center (2,567); Nashville, TN |
*Non-conference game. ^{#}Rankings from AP Poll, (#) during NIT is seed within region. (#) Tournament seedings in parentheses. All times are in Eastern Time.
