= 2013–14 Mount St. Mary's Mountaineers men's basketball team =

American college basketball season

2013–14 Mount St. Mary's Mountaineers men's basketball
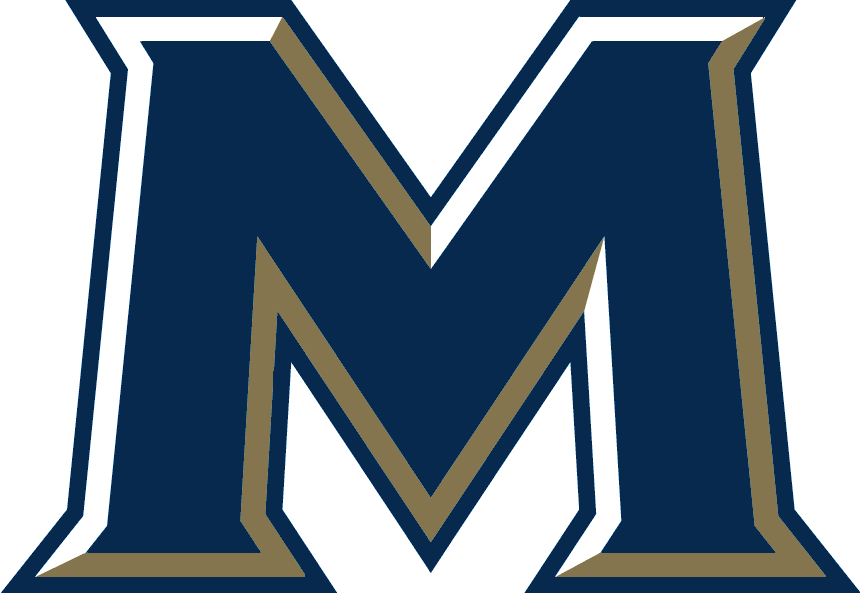

NEC tournament champions

NCAA tournament, first round
- Conference: Northeast Conference
- Record: 16–17 (9–7 NEC)
- Head coach: Jamion Christian (2nd season)
- Assistant coaches: Ben Wilkins; Darryl Bruce; Donny Lind
- Home arena: Knott Arena

2013–14 Northeast Conference men's basketball standings
	Conf.				Overall
Team	W		L	PCT	W		L	PCT
Robert Morris	14	–	2	.875	22	–	14	.611
Wagner	12	–	4	.750	19	–	12	.613
Bryant	10	–	6	.625	18	–	14	.563
St. Francis Brooklyn	9	–	7	.563	18	–	14	.563
Mount St. Mary's †	9	–	7	.563	16	–	17	.485
Central Connecticut	7	–	9	.438	11	–	19	.367
Saint Francis	7	–	9	.438	10	–	21	.323
Fairleigh Dickinson	6	–	10	.375	10	–	21	.323
LIU Brooklyn	4	–	12	.250	9	–	20	.310
Sacred Heart	2	–	14	.125	5	–	26	.161
† 2014 NEC tournament winner

The 2013–14 Mount St. Mary's Mountaineers men's basketball team represented Mount St. Mary's University during the 2013–14 NCAA Division I men's basketball season. The Mountaineers, led by second year head coach Jamion Christian, played their home games at Knott Arena and were members of the Northeast Conference. They finished the season 16–17, 9–7 in NEC play to finish in a tie for fourth place. They were champions of the NEC tournament to earn an automatic bid to the NCAA tournament where they lost in the First Four to Albany.

== Roster ==
Number	Name	Position	Height	Weight	Year	Hometown
0	Chris Martin	Guard	6–0	190	Junior	Upper Marlboro, Maryland
2	Byron Ashe	Guard	6–0	155	Freshman	Washington, D.C.
3	Sam Prescott	Guard	6–3	185	Senior	Philadelphia, Pennsylvania
4	Khalid Nwandu	Guard	6–3	165	Freshman	York, Pennsylvania
5	Liam McManimon	Guard	5–10	160	Sophomore	Galloway, New Jersey
11	Will Miller	Forward	6–6	185	Freshman	Dallas, Texas
12	Charles Glover	Guard	6–1	180	Freshman	Bowie, Maryland
13	Kristijan Krajina	Forward	6–9	230	Senior	Osijek, Croatia
14	Will Lyle	Forward	6–6	195	Sophomore	Washington, D.C.
15	Gregory Graves	Forward	6–7	205	Sophomore	Sterling, Virginia
21	Maalik Howard	Guard	6–0	160	Freshman	Woodbridge, Virginia
22	Rashad Whack	Guard	6–2	179	Senior	Hyattsville, Maryland
23	Julian Norfleet	Guard	6–2	165	Senior	Virginia Beach, Virginia
34	Aaron Brown	Forward	6–6	205	Junior	Fort Worth, Texas
50	Taylor Danaher	Center	7–0	215	Sophomore	Fredericksburg, Virginia

== Schedule ==
Date time, TV	Rank^{#}	Opponent^{#}	Result	Record	Site (attendance) city, state
Regular season
11/08/2013*; 8:00 pm		at West Virginia	L 62–77	0–1	WVU Coliseum (8,336); Morgantown, WV
11/13/2013*; 7:00 pm		at Villanova	L 59–90	0–2	The Pavilion (6,500); Villanova, PA
11/15/2013*; 9:30 pm		at BYU; CBE Hall of Fame Classic	L 76–108	0–3	Marriott Center (16,481); Provo, UT
11/17/2013*; 2:00 pm		at UMBC	L 84–90 ^{OT}	0–4	Retriever Activities Center (1,056); Catonsville, MD
11/20/2013*; 7:00 pm		vs. UMES	L 71–78	0–5	Hytche Athletic Center (2,915); Princess Anne, MD
11/23/2013*; 4:00 pm		American	W 68–64	1–5	Knott Arena (1,656); Emmitsburg, MD
11/26/2013*; 7:00 pm		Bucknell	W 69–64	2–5	Knott Arena (1,010); Emmitsburg, MD
11/29/2013*; 1:00 pm		at No. 1 Michigan State	L 65–98	2–6	Breslin Center (14,797); East Lansing, MI
12/04/2013*; 7:00 pm		Binghamton	L 70–74	2–7	Knott Arena (813); Emmitsburg, MD
12/07/2013*; 2:00 pm		Loyola (MD)	W 70–58	3–7	Knott Arena (1,587); Emmitsburg, MD
12/22/2013*; 2:00 pm		at Penn State	L 82–92	3–8	Bryce Jordan Center (8,284); University Park, PA
12/30/2013*; 8:00 pm		at Texas Tech	L 69–100	3–9	United Spirit Arena (4,821); Lubbock, TX
01/03/2014*; 7:00 pm		at Norfolk State	W 104–84	4–9	Joseph G. Echols Memorial Hall (700); Norfolk, VA
01/09/2013; 7:00 pm		at Fairleigh Dickinson	L 79–85	4–10 (0–1)	Rothman Center (709); Hackensack, NJ
01/11/2014; 2:00 pm		St. Francis Brooklyn	W 88–82	5–10 (1–1)	Knott Arena (1,102); Emmitsburg, MD
01/16/2014; 7:00 pm		Wagner	W 89–80	6–10 (2–1)	Knott Arena (1,398); Emmitsburg, MD
01/18/2014; 2:00 pm		Robert Morris	L 69–77	6–11 (2–2)	Knott Arena (1,499); Emmitsburg, MD
01/23/2014; 7:00 pm		at Saint Francis (PA)	W 83–77	7–11 (3–2)	DeGol Arena (714); Loretto, PA
01/25/2014; 4:30 pm		at LIU Brooklyn	L 71–75	7–12 (3–3)	Wellness, Recreation & Athletics Center (1,421); Brooklyn, NY
01/30/2014; 7:00 pm		Fairleigh Dickinson	W 87–82 ^{OT}	8–12 (4–3)	Knott Arena (1,142); Emmitsburg, MD
02/01/2014; 2:30 pm		LIU Brooklyn	W 95–92	9–12 (5–3)	Knott Arena (2,276); Emmitsburg, MD
02/06/2014; 7:00 pm, ESPN3		at Sacred Heart	W 73–60	10–12 (6–3)	William H. Pitt Center (N/A); Fairfield, CT
02/08/2014; 4:00 pm		at Bryant	L 75–78	10–13 (6–4)	Chace Athletic Center (1,267); Smithfield, RI
02/15/2014; 4:00 pm		at Robert Morris	L 61–69	10–14 (6–5)	Charles L. Sewall Center (2,062); Moon Township, PA
02/20/2014; 7:00 pm		at Central Connecticut	W 87–76	11–14 (7–5)	William H. Detrick Gymnasium (1,849); New Britain, CT
02/22/2014; 4:00 pm		at Wagner	L 66–71	11–15 (7–6)	Spiro Sports Center (1,823); Staten Island, NY
02/24/2014; 8:30 pm		Bryant	W 88–73	12–15 (8–6)	Knott Arena (1,040); Emmitsburg, MD
02/27/2014; 7:00 pm		Sacred Heart	L 65–72	12–16 (8–7)	Knott Arena (1,507); Emmitsburg, MD
03/01/2014; 2:00 pm		Saint Francis (PA)	W 78–55	13–16 (9–7)	Knott Arena (1,727); Emmitsburg, MD
Northeast Conference tournament
03/05/2014; 7:00 pm, MSG+/FCS/RTPT		St. Francis Brooklyn; Quarterfinals	W 72–71	14–16	Knott Arena (1,309); Emmitsburg, MD
03/08/2014; 12:00 pm, MSG+/FCS		at Wagner; Semifinals	W 77–72	15–16	Spiro Sports Center (1,287); Staten Island, NY
03/11/2014; 7:00 pm, ESPN2		at Robert Morris; Championship	W 88–71	16–16	Charles L. Sewall Center (3,024); Moon Township, PA
NCAA tournament
03/18/2014; 6:40 pm, truTV	No. (16 S)	vs. (16 S) Albany; First Four	L 64–71	16–17	University of Dayton Arena (12,077); Dayton, OH
*Non-conference game. ^{#}Rankings from AP Poll, (#) during NCAA Tournament is seed within region S=South. (#) Tournament seedings in parentheses. All times are in Eastern Time.
