= 2014 Northeast Conference men's basketball tournament =

2014 basketball tournament

- Classification: Division I
- Season: 2013–14
- Teams: 8
- Site: campus sites
- Finals site: Charles L. Sewall Center; Moon Township, Pennsylvania
- Champions: Mount St. Mary's (4th title)
- Winning coach: Jamion Christian (1st title)
- MVP: Rashad Whack (MSM)
- Attendance: 10,999 (total); 3,024 (championship)

2013–14 Northeast Conference men's basketball standings
	Conf.				Overall
Team	W		L	PCT	W		L	PCT
Robert Morris	14	–	2	.875	22	–	14	.611
Wagner	12	–	4	.750	19	–	12	.613
Bryant	10	–	6	.625	18	–	14	.563
St. Francis Brooklyn	9	–	7	.563	18	–	14	.563
Mount St. Mary's †	9	–	7	.563	16	–	17	.485
Central Connecticut	7	–	9	.438	11	–	19	.367
Saint Francis	7	–	9	.438	10	–	21	.323
Fairleigh Dickinson	6	–	10	.375	10	–	21	.323
LIU Brooklyn	4	–	12	.250	9	–	20	.310
Sacred Heart	2	–	14	.125	5	–	26	.161
† 2014 NEC tournament winner

The 2014 Northeast Conference men's basketball tournament was held on March 5, 8, and 11. The tournament featured the league's top eight seeds. The tourney opened on Wednesday, March 5 with the quarterfinals, followed by the semifinals on Saturday, March 8 and the finals on Tuesday, March 11. Mount St. Mary's won the championship, its fourth, and received the conferences automatic bid to the 2014 NCAA tournament.

== Format ==
For the tenth straight year, the NEC Men’s Basketball Tournament will consist of an eight-team playoff format with all games played at the home of the higher seed. After the quarterfinals, the teams will be reseeded so the highest remaining seed plays the lowest remaining seed in the semifinals.

== Seeds ==
Teams are seeded based on the final regular season standings, with ties broken under an NEC policy.

2014 NEC Men's Basketball Tournament seeds
Seed	School	Conference	Overall	Tiebreaker
1‡	Robert Morris	14–2	19–12	
2	Wagner	12–4	18–11	
3	Bryant	10–6	18–13	
4	Mount St. Mary's	9–7	13–16	1–0 vs. St. Francis Brooklyn
5	St. Francis Brooklyn	9–7	18–13	
6	Saint Francis (PA)	7–9	9–20	2–0 vs. Central Connecticut
7	Central Connecticut	7–9	11–18	
8	Fairleigh Dickinson	6–10	10–20	
‡ – NEC regular season champions. Overall records are as of the end of the regular season.

== Bracket ==
Quarterfinals; Wednesday, March 5 NEC Front Row, MSG+2, FCS and Root Pittsburgh
1	Robert Morris	60
8	Fairleigh Dickinson	53
4	Mount St. Mary's	72
5	St. Francis Brooklyn	71
(Pairings are reseeded after the first round)
2	Wagner	83
7	Central Connecticut	59
3	Bryant	54
6	Saint Francis (PA)	55

Semifinals; Saturday, March 8 (reseeded); MSG+, FCS
1	Robert Morris	60
6	Saint Francis (PA)	57
2	Wagner	72
4	Mount St. Mary's	77

Championship; Tuesday, March 11; ESPN2
1	Robert Morris	71
4	Mount St. Mary's	88

All games were played at the venue of the higher seed

== Game summaries ==
=== Quarterfinals: Robert Morris vs. Fairleigh Dickinson ===
Series History: RMU leads 39-30

Mar 5
7:00 pm EST

Recap

Robert Morris Colonials 60, Fairleigh Dickinson Knights 53
Scoring by half: 26-24, 34-29
Pts: Lucky Jones 19; Rebs: Lucky Jones 7 Asts: Lucky Jones & David Appolon 4	Pts: Sidney Sanders, Jr 16; Rebs: Mathias Seilund 10; Asts: Sidney Sanders, Jr 3

Charles L. Sewall Center
Moon Township, PA
Attendance: 1,117
Referees: Donnie Eppley, Tom Courtney, Andrew Maira

=== Quarterfinals: Mount St. Mary's vs. St. Francis Brooklyn ===
Series History: MSM leads 31-29
Announcers: Dave Popkin, Terry O'Connor, Paul Dottino

FCS

Mar 5
7:00 pm EST

Recap

Mount St. Mary's Mountaineers 72, St. Francis Brooklyn Terriers 71
Scoring by half: 21-33, 51-38
Pts: Rashad Whack 28; Rebs: Gregory Graves 8 Asts: Julian Norfleet 6	Pts: Lowell Ulmer 18; Rebs: Amdy Fall 7 Asts: Brent Jones 7

Knott Arena
Emmitsburg, MD
Attendance: 1,309
Referees: Rob Riley, Bill McCarthy, Bob Testa

=== Quarterfinals: Wagner vs. Central Connecticut ===
Series History: WC leads 20-19

Mar 5
7:00 pm EST

Recap

Wagner Seahawks 83, Central Connecticut Blue Devils 59
Scoring by half: 29-37, 37-46
Pts: Kenneth Ortiz 21; Rebs: Orlando Parker 12; Asts: Latif Rivers 4	Pts: Kyle Vinales 20; Rebs: Brandon Peel 12; Asts: Khalen Cumberlander 4

Spiro Sports Center
Staten Island, NY
Attendance: 1,003
Referees: Earl Walton, Jeff Clark, Dennis Allocco

=== Quarterfinals: Saint Francis (PA) at Bryant ===
Series History: BU leads 6-3

Mar 5
2:00 pm EST

Recap

Saint Francis Red Flash 55, Bryant Bulldogs 54
Scoring by half: 28-25, 27-29
Pts: Ronnie Drinnon 28; Rebs: Ronnie Drinnon 18; Asts: Earl Brown 7	Pts: Dyami Starks 19; Rebs: Alex Francis 6 Asts: Shane McLaughlin 5

Chace Athletic Center
Smithfield, RI
Attendance: 1,520
Referees: John Hughes, Gary Pucino, Brandon Cruz

=== Semifinal: Mount St. Mary's at Wagner ===
Series History: WC leads 32-19
Announcers: Paul Dottino, Tim Capstraw, Matt Martucci

FCS

Mar 8
12:00 pm EST

Recap

Mount St. Mary's Mountaineers 77, Wagner Seahawks 72
Scoring by half: 35-31, 42-41
Pts: Rashad Whack 21; Rebs: Gregory Graves 7 Asts: Julian Norfleet 7	Pts: Kenneth Ortiz 26; Rebs: Orlando Parker 10; Asts: Latif Rivers 3

Spiro Sports Center
Staten Island, NY
Attendance: 1,287
Referees: Brian Dorsey, Frank Scagliotta, Tom Courtney

=== Semifinal: Robert Morris vs. Saint Francis (PA) ===
Series History: RMU leads 48-28
Announcers: John Schmeelk, Joe DeSantis, Pat O'Keefe

FCS

Mar 8
7:00 pm EST

Recap

Robert Morris Colonials 60, Saint Francis Red Flash 57
Scoring by half: 15-20, 45-37
Pts: Karvel Anderson 21; Rebs: Lucky Jones 7 Asts: Lucky Jones 3	Pts: Earl Brown 18; Rebs: Ronnie Drinnon 9 Asts: Earl Brown & Dominique Major 2

Charles L. Sewall Center
Moon Township, PA
Attendance: 1,739
Referees: Guy Pagano; Tom Regan; Jim Bruno

=== Championship: Mount St. Mary's at Robert Morris ===
Series History: RMU leads 30-27
Announcers: Mike Crispino, Miles Simon

ESPN2

Mar 11
7:00 pm EST

Recap

Mount St. Mary's Mountaineers 88, Robert Morris Colonials 71
Scoring by half: 48-32, 40-39
Pts: Rashad Whack 20; Rebs: Sam Prescott 6 Asts: Rashad Whack & Sam Prescott 4	Pts: Karvel Anderson 21; Rebs: Lucky Jones & Charles Oliver 5 Asts: Kavon Stewart 5

Charles L. Sewall Center
Moon Township, PA
Attendance: 3,024
Referees: Earl Walton, Donnie Eppley, Guy Pagano

== All-tournament team ==
Tournament MVP in bold.

Name	School	Pos.	Year	Ht.	Hometown
**Rashad Whack**	Mount St. Mary's	Guard	Senior	6-2	Hyattsville, Maryland
Julian Norfleet	Mount St. Mary's	Guard	Senior	6-2	Virginia Beach, Virginia
Sam Prescott	Mount St. Mary's	Guard	Senior	6-3	Philadelphia, Pennsylvania
Lucky Jones	Robert Morris	Forward	Junior	6-5	Newark, New Jersey
Kenneth Ortiz	Wagner	Guard	Senior	6-0	Newark, New Jersey
