= 2013–14 Wagner Seahawks men's basketball team =

American college basketball season

2013–14 Wagner Seahawks men's basketball
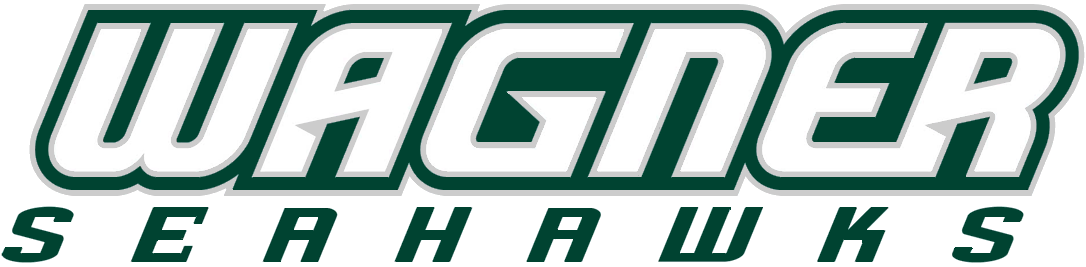
- Conference: Northeast Conference
- Record: 19–12 (12–4 NEC)
- Head coach: Bashir Mason (2nd season)
- Assistant coaches: Mike Babul; Marquis Webb; Scott Smith
- Home arena: Spiro Sports Center

2013–14 Northeast Conference men's basketball standings
	Conf.				Overall
Team	W		L	PCT	W		L	PCT
Robert Morris	14	–	2	.875	22	–	14	.611
Wagner	12	–	4	.750	19	–	12	.613
Bryant	10	–	6	.625	18	–	14	.563
St. Francis Brooklyn	9	–	7	.563	18	–	14	.563
Mount St. Mary's †	9	–	7	.563	16	–	17	.485
Central Connecticut	7	–	9	.438	11	–	19	.367
Saint Francis	7	–	9	.438	10	–	21	.323
Fairleigh Dickinson	6	–	10	.375	10	–	21	.323
LIU Brooklyn	4	–	12	.250	9	–	20	.310
Sacred Heart	2	–	14	.125	5	–	26	.161
† 2014 NEC tournament winner

The 2013–14 Wagner Seahawks men's basketball team represented Wagner College during the 2013–14 NCAA Division I men's basketball season. The Seahawks were led by second year head coach Bashir Mason. They played their home games at Spiro Sports Center and were members of the Northeast Conference. They finished the season at 19–12 overall and 12–4 in conference play, for a second-place finish. Wagner defeated Central Connecticut in the NEC tournament quarterfinals before losing to Mount St. Mary's in the semifinals.

== Roster ==
Number	Name	Position	Height	Weight	Year	Hometown
1	Jay Harris	Guard	6–1	160	Junior	Aurora, Illinois
2	Dwaun Anderson	Guard	6–4	200	Sophomore	Suttons Bay, Michigan
3	Mario Moody	Forward	6–7	210	Junior	East Orange, New Jersey
4	Marcus Burton	Guard	6–0	170	Junior	Charlotte, North Carolina
5	Naofall Folahan	Center	6–11	215	Senior	Cotonou, Benin
12	Hugo Naurais	Forward	6–8	210	Junior	Nîmes, France
13	Langston Burnett	Guard	6–5	210	Sophomore	Beltsville, Maryland
15	Kenneth Ortiz	Guard	6–0	200	Senior	Newark, New Jersey
21	Orlando Parker	Forward	6–8	205	Senior	Orlando, Florida
24	Latif Rivers	Guard	6–1	175	Senior	Elizabeth, New Jersey
32	Nolan Long	Guard	6–10	240	Freshman	Waterford, Connecticut
35	Greg Senat	Guard	6–8	240	Freshman	Elmont, New York

== Schedule ==
Date time, TV	Opponent	Result	Record	Site (attendance) city, state
Regular season
11/09/2013*; 4:00 pm	at Penn State	L 62–74	0–1	Bryce Jordan Center (4,752); University Park, PA
11/12/2013*; 7:00 pm	Chestnut Hill	W 75–67	1–1	Spiro Sports Center (1,622); Staten Island, NY
11/15/2013*; 6:00 pm, FS2	at St. John's	L 57–73	1–2	Carnesecca Arena (4,337); Jamaica, NY
11/18/2013*; 7:30 pm	at Coppin State	W 102–87	2–2	Physical Education Complex (500); Baltimore, MD
11/21/2013*; 7:00 pm	Vermont	W 68–61	3–2	Spiro Sports Center (1,810); Staten Island, NY
11/25/2013*; 6:00 pm	vs. Stetson; Gulf Coast Showcase	W 81–64	4–2	Germain Arena (N/A); Estero, FL
11/26/2013*; 8:30 pm	vs. St. Bonaventure; Gulf Coast Showcase	L 67–70	4–3	Germain Arena (N/A); Estero, FL
11/27/2013*; 6:00 pm	vs. UIC; Gulf Coast Showcase	L 76–94	4–4	Germain Arena (N/A); Estero, FL
12/03/2013*; 7:00 pm	Lafayette	L 65–77	4–5	Spiro Sports Center (1,375); Staten Island, NY
12/07/2013*; 7:00 pm	at Penn	W 75–69	5–5	The Palestra (1,625); Philadelphia, PA
12/14/2013*; 4:00 pm	at Rider	L 58–79	5–6	Alumni Gymnasium (1,412); Lawrenceville, NJ
12/19/2013*; 7:00 pm	at La Salle	L 54–80	5–7	Tom Gola Arena (1,391); Philadelphia, PA
12/30/2013*; 3:00 pm	at Monmouth	W 59–52	6–7	Multipurpose Activity Center (1,645); West Long Branch, NJ
01/04/2014*; 1:00 pm	North Carolina Central			Spiro Sports Center; Staten Island, NY
01/09/2014; 7:00 pm	at Central Connecticut	W 88–59	7–7 (1–0)	William H. Detrick Gymnasium (1,411); New Britain, CT
01/11/2014; 4:00 pm	LIU Brooklyn	W 84–70	8–7 (2–0)	Spiro Sports Center (1,845); Staten Island, NY
01/16/2014; 7:00 pm	at Mount St. Mary's	L 80–89	8–8 (2–1)	Knott Arena (1,398); Emmitsburg, MD
01/18/2014; 2:00 pm	at Saint Francis (PA)	W 56–50	9–8 (3–1)	DeGol Arena (1,012); Loretto, PA
01/23/2014; 7:00 pm	Central Connecticut	L 83–87	9–9 (3–2)	Spiro Sports Center (1,614); Staten Island, NY
01/25/2014; 4:00 pm	at Robert Morris	L 70–74	9–10 (3–3)	Charles L. Sewall Center (1,093); Moon Township, PA
01/30/2014; 7:00 pm	at LIU Brooklyn	W 75–68	10–10 (4–3)	Wellness, Recreation & Athletics Center (1,271); Brooklyn, NY
02/01/2014; 5:00 pm	at St. Francis Brooklyn	L 72–73 ^{OT}	10–11 (4–4)	Generoso Pope Athletic Complex (400); Brooklyn, NY
02/06/2014; 7:00 pm	Fairleigh Dickinson	W 75–68	11–11 (5–4)	Spiro Sports Center (1,206); Staten Island, NY
02/08/2014; 2:00 pm	at Sacred Heart	W 62–55	12–11 (6–4)	William H. Pitt Center (N/A); Fairfield, CT
02/15/2014; 4:00 pm	Bryant	W 73–61	13–11 (7–4)	Spiro Sports Center (2,027); Staten Island, NY
02/20/2014; 7:00 pm	Sacred Heart	W 74–62	14–11 (8–4)	Spiro Sports Center (1,301); Staten Island, NY
02/22/2014; 4:00 pm	Mount St. Mary's	W 71–66	15–11 (9–4)	Spiro Sports Center (1,823); Staten Island, NY
02/24/2014; 7:00 pm	at Fairleigh Dickinson; Postponed from 2/13	W 67–64	16–11 (10–4)	Rothman Center (724); Hackensack, NJ
02/27/2014; 4:00 pm	Saint Francis (PA)	W 74–45	17–11 (11–4)	Spiro Sports Center (1,410); Staten Island, NY
03/01/2014; 4:00 pm	Robert Morris	W 59–48	18–11 (12–4)	Spiro Sports Center (2,113); Staten Island, NY
2014 Northeast Conference tournament
03/05/2014; 7:00 pm	Central Connecticut; Quarterfinals	W 83–59	19–11	Spiro Sports Center (1,003); Staten Island, NY
03/08/2014; 12:00 pm, MSG+/FCS	Mount St. Mary's; Semifinals	L 72–77	19–12	Spiro Sports Center (1,287); Staten Island, NY
*Non-conference game. ^{#}Rankings from AP Poll. (#) Tournament seedings in parentheses. All times are in Eastern Time..

* Due to inclement weather in the Northeast, January 4's game vs. Wagner was canceled.
