= 2013–14 St. Francis Brooklyn Terriers men's basketball team =

American college basketball season

2013–14 St. Francis Brooklyn Terriers men's basketball
- Conference: Northeast Conference
- Record: 18–14 (9–7 NEC)
- Head coach: Glenn Braica (4th season)
- Assistant coaches: Clive Bentick (7th season); Ron Ganulin (1st season); Jamaal Womack (1st season)
- Home arena: Generoso Pope Athletic Complex

2013–14 Northeast Conference men's basketball standings
| | Conf. | | | | Overall |
| Team | W | | L | PCT | W | | L | PCT |
|---|---|---|---|---|---|---|---|---|
| Robert Morris | 14 | – | 2 | .875 | 22 | – | 14 | .611 |
| Wagner | 12 | – | 4 | .750 | 19 | – | 12 | .613 |
| Bryant | 10 | – | 6 | .625 | 18 | – | 14 | .563 |
| St. Francis Brooklyn | 9 | – | 7 | .563 | 18 | – | 14 | .563 |
| Mount St. Mary's † | 9 | – | 7 | .563 | 16 | – | 17 | .485 |
| Central Connecticut | 7 | – | 9 | .438 | 11 | – | 19 | .367 |
| Saint Francis | 7 | – | 9 | .438 | 10 | – | 21 | .323 |
| Fairleigh Dickinson | 6 | – | 10 | .375 | 10 | – | 21 | .323 |
| LIU Brooklyn | 4 | – | 12 | .250 | 9 | – | 20 | .310 |
| Sacred Heart | 2 | – | 14 | .125 | 5 | – | 26 | .161 |
† 2014 NEC tournament winner

The 2013–2014 St. Francis Brooklyn Terriers men's basketball team represented St. Francis College during the 2013–14 NCAA Division I men's basketball season. The team was coached by Glenn Braica, who was in his fourth year at the helm of the St. Francis Terriers. The Terrier's home games were played at the Generoso Pope Athletic Complex. The team has been a member of the Northeast Conference since 1981. The Terriers were selected to participate in the 2013 Maui Invitational Tournament where they won the Consolation Game of the Regional Rounds.

St. Francis Brooklyn finished the season at 18–14 overall and 9–7 in conference play for a fourth place tie with Mount St. Mary's. The Terriers qualified for their fourth consecutive NEC tournament under head coach Glenn Braica. The Terriers were given the 5th seed because of a regular season loss to Mount St. Mary's, which served as a tiebreaker. The 5th seed Terriers went on the road to take on 4th seed Mount St. Mary's, losing 72–71. The Terriers led by 19 points with 9:15 left in the game yet lost in the final possession of the game.

== Season outlook ==
In Glenn Braica's first three seasons, the Terriers have made the NEC tournament each year. Going into this season Braica has a combined 42–48 overall record and 30–24 conference record. Last year the Terriers earned the eighth seed in the conference, yet for the third season in a row the Terriers were eliminated in the quarterfinals. For the 2013–14 campaign, the Terriers were picked to finish seventh in the NEC by the NEC Preseason Coaches Poll.

There were changes to the coaching staff prior to the start of the season. Andy Johnston and Danny Nigro, both assistant coaches in Braica's staff resigned, with Johnston taking a professional head coaching position in Iceland. Coach Braica filled out his staff with former Terrier head coach Ron Ganulin and former Terrier player Jamaal Womack. Clive Bentick who is entering his seventh season as an assistant coach was elevated to the top spot. Ganulin was head coach for 14 years during which he accumulated over 200 wins and was twice named the Northeast Conference's Coach of the Year.

The Terriers will have four of their five starters returning for the season. The only loss in the starting 5 is Forward-center Akeem Johnson, who graduated and signed a professional contract to play in the Korisliiga of Finland. The Terriers may fill the vacancy with returning Senior Matt Milk or returning Junior Lowell Ulmer, with Milk more of a traditional Center and the more athletic Ulmer a forward-center. The four returning starters are Junior Power forward Jalen Cannon, Junior Swingman Kevin Douglas, Senior Shooting guard Ben Mockford and Junior Point guard Brent Jones. Of the four, Jones will be heavily challenged for playing time at the one position by returning Sophomore Anthony White. The Terriers top returning player is Jalen Cannon, who earned Second Team All Northeast Conference honors last season and led the team in scoring (14.7 ppg), rebounding (8.8 rpg) and field goal percentage (.556). Cannon also earned All-Rookie Team honors as a freshman in 2011–2012 and was selected for the 2013–14 Preseason All-NEC Team. In addition to the returning players the Terriers added several players that figure to compete for the Center and Point guard positions.

== Preseason signings ==
The Terriers have nine returning players and have added 4 new players. They include sophomore forward Amdy Fall, freshman guard Sheldon Hagigal, freshman guard Yunus Hopkinson and freshman forward Wayne Martin. Fall helped the College of Central Florida to the NJCAA Men's Division I Basketball Championship and prior to Junior College, Fall helped lead Wings Academy (Bronx, NY) to the PSAL semifinals in 2010–2011. Hagigal is a strong combo guard who prepped for two years at West Oaks Academy (Orlando, Florida) and averaged 13 points, 2 assists, and 5 rebounds. Prior to West Oaks Hagigal led Westbury High School (Long Island) to the 2010 county championship title and then to the Class A Long Island title. Hopkinson is a point guard who prepped at Lee Academy in Maine in 2011–2012. Prior to enrolling at Lee Academy, Hopkinson was the eighth leading scorer in the city and finished second-best in the PSAL's 'AA' divisions in 2009–2010, averaging 28.3 points per outing for West 50th Street Campus (Food & Finance). Martin helped lead South Shore to a 17–9 record and a berth in the PSAL quarterfinals in 2011–2012. Martin averaged 12.1 points and 8.3 rebounds per game.

== Regular season ==
=== Non-conference games ===
St. Francis Brooklyn upset Miami (FL) in their first match of the season 66–62 in overtime. The Hurricanes were the defending ACC regular season and ACC tournament champions, and the Terriers win on the road is a program highlight. The Terriers were led by freshman Wayne Martin, who came off the bench to score 17 points and Jalen Cannon, who had his first double-double of the season with 14 points and 10 rebounds. For their second match the Terriers beat Florida Atlantic 59–57, completing a two-game sweep while in Florida. The Terriers were led by Jalen Cannon and Ben Mockford, with each contributing 15 points and for the second straight game, rookie Wayne Martin added critical baskets down the stretch by scoring the winning layup with 32 seconds remaining.

Maui Invitational Tournament
The Terriers were selected to participate in the 2013 Maui Invitational Tournament. In the opening games, the Terriers lost to Dayton on the road, 58–78. They then traveled to Syracuse to take on the number 9 ranked Orange where they almost pulled off an upset. The Terriers led most of the second half and were leading with less than 2 minutes in the game, yet they lost 50–56. St. Francis Brooklyn then traveled to Conway, South Carolina to participate in the Mainland Semifinals of the Maui Invitational, where they lost to the hosts Coastal Carolina Chanticleers, 59–70. The Terriers then participated in the Consolation Game against the Oakland Golden Grizzlies where they won 68–62. The Terriers were led by Jalen Cannon who put up 22 points and grabbed 9 rebounds and Brent Jones who had his first career double-double.

After the Maui Invitational Tournament the Terriers headed back to Brooklyn for their Home Opener against the Mount Saint Vincent Dolphins. They were able to beat the Dolphins 83–54 behind Martin's 18 points and Cannon's 17 points. St. Francis Brooklyn hit the road again to face the then 5–2 Stony Brook Seawolves, where they pulled out a 70–68 win with 1.5 seconds left on a Wayne Martin tip-in. The Terriers were led by Jalen Cannon's 23 points and the win gave them a 3-game win streak. The heavily favored Seawolves also had their 13-game home unbeaten streak broken. St. Francis then lost its next 2 games to teams with losing records, first at Army (1–6) and then hosting former NEC member Monmouth (3–6). The Terriers fell to the Black Knights 54–67 and never led in the game after the first minute of play. The only highlight of the game was Sheldon Hagigal's career high 13 points. Against Monmouth the Terriers also trailed for most of the game and the closest they ever game to tying was in the second half when they came within 6 points with 9:43 left in the second half. They were led again by Hagigal, who scored a new career high 23 points. The Terriers then snapped their two-game skid against Canisius at home. The Golden Griffins (6–3) came in averaging almost 74 points, yet the Terriers held them to 51 as they beat them 67–51. The freshman Hagigal led the Terriers in scoring with a 15-point effort. Next, St. Francis hosted the Lafayette Leopards at The Pope and won 65–62 on 19 points and 10 rebounds from Cannon. The game-winner came on a three-pointer from Isailovic which hit the backboard to end the game; the win put the Terriers at 7–5 on the season. The Terriers won their next two games and extended their win streak to four by beating NJIT at home 77–65 and Delaware State on the road 60–57. St. Francis was then poised to be the first men's basketball program in NEC history to win 10 non-conference games as they faced Columbia, but the Terriers were not able to attain the record as they lost 61–81. With the loss, the Terriers finished the non-conference portion of their schedule at 9–6, their best start to a season in 12 years.

=== NEC games ===
To open their conference schedule, the Terriers beat Long Island 78–64. The Terriers had a six-game losing streak against the Blackbirds dating back four years, yet they got their first win in seven attempts as Ben Mockford scored a career high 30 points. They next traveled to Maryland to take on Mount St. Mary's, which came in with a 4–10 record yet the Terriers fell 82–88. St. Francis never led in the game and the only highlights were the performances of Cannon (25 pts) and White (15 pts), both of which put up career highs for points scored. The Terriers proceeded to go 5–2 in their next 7 contests. Then prior to a pivotal NEC match-up against Robert Morris at The Pope on February 8, 2014, it was announced that 4 men's basketball players would be suspended. The players were Brent Jones, Anthony White, P. J. Santavenere, and Wayne Martin. The reason for their suspension was not announced. The Terriers ended up losing 50–72. Later on, all players except Anthony White were reinstated. Yet the distraction of the suspensions wound up costing the Terriers 3 consecutive loses, leading to a 6–6 conference record. The Terriers then won 3 of their last 4 games to finish conference play at 9–7 and the season at 18–13. The Terriers qualified for the NEC Tournament with the 5th seed. St. Francis Brooklyn won 18 games for the first time since the 2001–2002 season and also led the NEC in scoring defense (66.7) and rebounding margin (+3.3).

== NEC tournament ==
The Terriers qualified for their fourth consecutive NEC Tournament under fourth-year head coach Glenn Braica. The Terriers will have the 5th seed and face 4th seed Mount St. Mary's, the Terriers last met the Mount in the NEC playoffs in the 1999 semifinals where MSM won 68–66. The Terriers again lost in the quarterfinals of the NEC Tournament, this time losing 71–72. The Terriers led by 19 points with 9:15 left in the game yet lost in the final possession of the game. It was later revealed that for 2.5 seconds in the final minute of play Mount St. Mary's had 6 players on the court, during a crucial in-bounds pass by St. Francis. With 6 players Mount St. Mary's forced a turnover and scored a lay-up making it a 1-point game with 26 seconds left on the clock. The NEC commissioner reviewed the situation and assessed a two-game suspension for the 2014–15 regular season to the officiating crew that worked the game in question.

== Roster ==
2013–14 St. Francis Brooklyn Terriers men's basketball team
Players
Coaches

| Pos. | # | Name | Height | Weight | Year | Hometown |
|---|---|---|---|---|---|---|
| C | 33 | Matt Milk | 6 ft 8 in (2.03 m) | 220 lb (100 kg) | Sr | Wantagh, New York |
| G | 3 | Ben Mockford | 6 ft 2 in (1.88 m) | 175 lb (79 kg) | Sr | Shoreham-by-Sea, England |
| G | 25 | Aleksandar Isailovic | 6 ft 4 in (1.93 m) | 185 lb (84 kg) | Sr | Belgrade, Serbia |
| G | 1 | Brent Jones | 5 ft 10 in (1.78 m) | 170 lb (77 kg) | Jr | Bronx, New York |
| F | 5 | Jalen Cannon | 6 ft 6 in (1.98 m) | 230 lb (104 kg) | Jr | Allentown, Pennsylvania |
| G | 11 | Phillip Santavenere (S) | 6 ft 2 in (1.88 m) | 175 lb (79 kg) | Jr | Middletown, Connecticut |
| F | 23 | Lowell Ulmer | 6 ft 5 in (1.96 m) | 210 lb (95 kg) | Jr | Staten Island, New York |
| G/F | 34 | Kevin Douglas | 6 ft 5 in (1.96 m) | 210 lb (95 kg) | Jr | Bronx, New York |
| G | 44 | Anthony White (S) | 6 ft 2 in (1.88 m) | 190 lb (86 kg) | So | Mastic, New York |
| G | 13 | Edon Molic (W) | 6 ft 4 in (1.93 m) | 180 lb (82 kg) | So | Brooklyn, New York |
| F/C | 32 | Amdy Fall | 6 ft 6 in (1.98 m) | 220 lb (100 kg) | So | Manhattan, New York |
| G | 2 | Yunus Hopkinson | 5 ft 10 in (1.78 m) | 175 lb (79 kg) | Fr | Manhattan, New York |
| G | 43 | Sheldon Hagigal | 6 ft 1 in (1.85 m) | 175 lb (79 kg) | Fr | Westbury, New York |
| F | 45 | Wayne Martin | 6 ft 6 in (1.98 m) | 215 lb (98 kg) | Fr | Brooklyn, New York |

Head coach

- Glenn Braica (Queens College '89)

Assistant coach(es)

- Clive Bentick (Canisius '01)
- Ron Ganulin (LIU '68)
- Jamaal Womack (St. Francis '09)

Legend

- (C) Team captain
- (S) Suspended
- (I) Ineligible
- (W) Walk-on
- Injured
- Current redshirt

Roster
Last update: November 3, 2013

=== Depth chart ===
| Pos. | Starting 5 | Bench 1 | Bench 2 | Bench 3 |
|---|---|---|---|---|
| C | Matt Milk | Amdy Fall (PF/C) |
| PF | Jalen Cannon | Lowell Ulmer |
| SF | Kevin Douglas (SG/SF) | Wayne Martin | Aleksander Isailovic |
| SG | Ben Mockford | Sheldon Hagigal (PG) | Edon Molic |
| PG | Brent Jones | Anthony White | Yunus Hopkinson | P. J. Santavenere |

== Schedule and results ==
| Date time, TV | Opponent | Result | Record | High points | High rebounds | High assists | Site (attendance) city, state |
Non-conference regular season
| November 8, 2013*; 10:00 pm, ESPN3 | at Miami (FL) | W 66–62 ^{OT} | 1–0 | 17 – Martin | 10 – Cannon | 4 – Jones | BankUnited Center (6,060); Coral Gables, FL |
| November 11, 2013*; 7:00 pm | at Florida Atlantic | W 59–57 | 2–0 | 15 – Mockford, Cannon | 9 – Cannon | 3 – Jones, Hagigal | FAU Arena (1,332); Boca Raton, FL |
| November 16, 2013*; 7:00 pm, FSOH | at Dayton; Maui Invitational tournament Opening Games | L 58–78 | 2–1 | 14 – Cannon | 8 – Cannon | 3 – Jones | UD Arena (12,183); Dayton, OH |
| November 18, 2013*; 7:00 pm, ESPN3 | at No. 9 Syracuse; Maui Invitational Tournament; Opening Games | L 50–56 | 2–2 | 16 – Cannon | 8 – Cannon | 4 – Jones | Carrier Dome (23,117); Syracuse, NY |
| November 23, 2013*; 4:00 pm | at Coastal Carolina; Maui Invitational Tournament; Regional semifinals | L 59–70 | 2–3 | 11 – Cannon | 6 – Martin | 1 – 6 Tied | HTC Center (1,550); Conway, SC |
| November 24, 2013*; 12:30 pm | vs. Oakland; Maui Invitational Tournament; Regional consolation | W 68–62 | 3–3 | 22 – Cannon | 9 – Cannon | 10 – Jones | HTC Center (1,430); Conway, SC |
| November 27, 2013*; 2:00 pm | Mount Saint Vincent | W 83–54 | 4–3 | 17 – Martin | 9 – Martin | 6 – White | Generoso Pope Athletic Complex (335); Brooklyn, NY |
| December 1, 2013*; 2:00 pm | at Stony Brook | W 70–68 | 5–3 | 23 – Cannon | 8 – Cannon | 5 – White | Pritchard Gymnasium (1,456); Stony Brook, NY |
| December 7, 2013*; 2:00 pm | at Army | L 54–67 | 5–4 | 13 – Hagigal | 10 – Cannon | 1 – Milk | Christl Arena (663); West Point, NY |
| December 10, 2013*; 7:00 pm | Monmouth | L 58–73 | 5–5 | 23 – Hagigal | 8 – Martin | 3 – Hagigal | Generoso Pope Athletic Complex (483); Brooklyn, NY |
| December 14, 2013*; 4:00 pm | Canisius | W 67–51 | 6–5 | 15 – Hagigal | 10 – Cannon | 8 – Jones | Generoso Pope Athletic Complex (278); Brooklyn, NY |
| December 19, 2013*; 7:00 pm | Lafayette | W 65–62 | 7–5 | 19 – Cannon | 9 – Cannon | 3 – Hagigal | Generoso Pope Athletic Complex (413); Brooklyn, NY |
| December 23, 2013*; 7:00 pm | NJIT | W 77–65 | 8–5 | 18 – Cannon | 8 – Isailovic | 6 – Jones | Generoso Pope Athletic Complex (305); Brooklyn, NY |
| December 30, 2013*; 4:00 pm | at Delaware State | W 60–57 | 9–5 | 17 – Cannon, Mockford | 12 – Cannon | 7 – Jones | Memorial Hall (268); Dover, DE |
| January 4, 2014*; 4:00 pm | at Columbia | L 61–81 | 9–6 | 15 – Cannon, Mockford | 6 – Cannon | 2 – Jones | Levien Gymnasium (931); New York, NY |
NEC Regular season
| January 9, 2014; 7:00 pm | LIU-Brooklyn | W 78–64 | 10–6 (1–0) | 30 – Mockford | 14 – Cannon | 12 – Jones | Generoso Pope Athletic Complex (1,117); Brooklyn, NY |
| January 11, 2014; 2:00 pm | at Mount St. Mary's | L 82–88 | 10–7 (1–1) | 25 – Cannon | 11 – Cannon | 7 – Jones | Knott Arena (1,102); Emmitsburg, MD |
| January 16, 2014; 7:00 pm | at Central Connecticut | W 76–66 | 11–7 (2–1) | 20 – Cannon | 10 – Cannon | 11 – Jones | William H. Detrick Gymnasium (1,115); New Britain, CT |
| January 18, 2014; 5:00 pm | Sacred Heart | W 74–71 | 12–7 (3–1) | 23 – Mockford | 4 – 3 Tied | 11 – Jones | Generoso Pope Athletic Complex (602); Brooklyn, NY |
| January 23, 2014; 7:00 pm | at Fairleigh Dickinson | L 85–86 | 12–8 (3–2) | 23 – Cannon | 11 – Cannon | 10 – Jones | Rothman Center (523); Teaneck, NJ |
| January 25, 2014; 7:00 pm | at Bryant | L 79–83 | 12–9 (3–3) | 20 – Jones | 9 – Cannon | 5 – Jones | Chace Athletic Center (925); Smithfield, RI |
| January 29, 2014; 6:00 pm, MSG/FCS | at Sacred Heart | W 83–78 | 13–9 (4–3) | 28 – Jones | 7 – White | 8 – Jones | William H. Pitt Center (407); Fairfield, CT |
| February 1, 2014; 5:00 pm | Wagner | W 73–72 ^{OT} | 14–9 (5–3) | 19 – Cannon | 11 – Cannon | 3 – Jones, White | Generoso Pope Athletic Complex (400); Brooklyn, NY |
| February 6, 2014; 7:00 pm | Saint Francis (PA) | W 78–52 | 15–9 (6–3) | 23 – Hagigal | 6 – Martin | 4 – Jones | Generoso Pope Athletic Complex (373); Brooklyn, NY |
| February 8, 2014; 2:00 pm | Robert Morris | L 50–72 | 15–10 (6–4) | 10 – Cannon, Isailovic | 9 – Cannon | 5 – Cannon | Generoso Pope Athletic Complex (574); Brooklyn, NY |
| February 16, 2014; 4:00PM, MSG/FCS | vs. LIU Brooklyn; Battle of Brooklyn | L 68–69 | 15–11 (6–5) | 17 – Mockford | 6 – Cannon | 4 – Jones | Barclay's Center (2,767); Brooklyn, NY |
| February 18, 2014; 7:00 pm | Central Connecticut; Postponed from 2/13 | L 71–73 | 15–12 (6–6) | 18 – Mockford | 12 – Cannon | 6 – Jones | Generoso Pope Athletic Complex (378); Brooklyn, NY |
| February 20, 2014; 7:00 pm | at Saint Francis (PA) | W 73–44 | 16–12 (7–6) | 16 – Mockford | 7 – Martin | 11 – Jones | DeGol Arena (1,024); Loretto, PA |
| February 22, 2014; 4:00 pm | at Robert Morris | L 70–71 ^{OT} | 16–13 (7–7) | 18 – Cannon, Ulmer | 7 – Cannon, Jones | 8 – Jones | Charles L. Sewall Center (2,381); Moon Township, PA |
| February 27, 2014; 7:00 pm, ESPN3 | Bryant | W 62–59 | 17–13 (8–7) | 21 – Fall | 10 – Cannon | 9 – Jones | Generoso Pope Athletic Complex (675); Brooklyn, NY |
| March 1, 2014; 5:00 pm | Fairleigh Dickinson | W 79–56 | 18–13 (9–7) | 20 – Mockford | 12 – Cannon | 11 – Jones | Generoso Pope Athletic Complex (634); Brooklyn, NY |
2014 NEC Tournament
| March 5, 2014; 7:00 pm, MSG+/FCS/RTPT | at (4) Mount St. Mary's; Quarterfinals | L 71–72 | 18–14 | 18 – Ulmer | 7 – Fall | 2 – Ulmer | Knott Arena (1,309); Emmitsburg, MD |
*Non-conference game. ^{#}Rankings from AP Poll. (#) Tournament seedings in parentheses. All times are in Eastern Time.

== Season statistics ==
Individual Player Statistics (As of March 9, 2014)
| | | | Minutes | | Scoring | | Total FGs | | | 3-point FGs | | | Free-Throws | | | Rebounds | | | | | | | |
| Player | GP | GS | Tot | Avg | Pts | Avg | FG | FGA | Pct | 3FG | 3FA | Pct | FT | FTA | Pct | Off | Def | Tot | Avg | A | TO | Blk | Stl |
|---|---|---|---|---|---|---|---|---|---|---|---|---|---|---|---|---|---|---|---|---|---|---|---|
| Cannon, Jalen | 32 | 32 | 959 | 30.0 | 476 | 14.9 | 164 | 335 | .490 | 13 | 48 | .271 | 135 | 189 | .714 | 94 | 169 | 263 | 8.2 | 39 | 37 | 17 | 20 |
| Martin, Wayne | 31 | 0 | 525 | 16.9 | 218 | 7.0 | 87 | 180 | .483 | 1 | 6 | .167 | 43 | 80 | .538 | 52 | 101 | 153 | 4.9 | 12 | 59 | 43 | 17 |
| Mockford, Ben | 30 | 27 | 884 | 29.5 | 359 | 12.0 | 121 | 286 | .423 | 87 | 214 | .407 | 30 | 38 | .789 | 6 | 42 | 48 | 1.6 | 27 | 24 | 1 | 7 |
| Douglas, Kevin | 30 | 16 | 453 | 15.1 | 124 | 4.1 | 45 | 109 | .413 | 14 | 28 | .292 | 20 | 30 | .667 | 27 | 53 | 80 | 2.7 | 11 | 34 | 5 | 12 |
| Jones, Brent | 31 | 16 | 825 | 26.6 | 233 | 7.5 | 76 | 178 | .427 | 20 | 59 | .339 | 61 | 84 | .726 | 15 | 77 | 92 | 3.0 | 187 | 70 | 3 | 33 |
| Fall, Amdy | 32 | 2 | 539 | 16.8 | 166 | 5.2 | 57 | 125 | .456 | 0 | 0 | .000 | 52 | 79 | .658 | 46 | 79 | 125 | 3.9 | 6 | 35 | 55 | 10 |
| Hagigal, Sheldon | 23 | 10 | 465 | 20.2 | 199 | 8.7 | 67 | 171 | .392 | 22 | 73 | .301 | 43 | 57 | .754 | 16 | 37 | 53 | 2.3 | 25 | 44 | 3 | 20 |
| Santavenere, P.J. | 15 | 0 | 104 | 6.9 | 28 | 1.9 | 10 | 32 | .313 | 5 | 24 | .208 | 3 | 6 | .500 | 4 | 11 | 15 | 1.0 | 1 | 2 | 1 | 4 |
| Isailovic, Aleksandar | 25 | 2 | 357 | 14.3 | 80 | 3.2 | 28 | 90 | .311 | 17 | 66 | .258 | 7 | 10 | .700 | 11 | 32 | 43 | 1.7 | 7 | 15 | 6 | 17 |
| Hopkinson, Yunus | 19 | 2 | 184 | 9.7 | 48 | 2.5 | 17 | 52 | .327 | 5 | 22 | .277 | 9 | 14 | .643 | 3 | 13 | 16 | 0.8 | 19 | 18 | 0 | 7 |
| White, Anthony | 23 | 22 | 530 | 23.0 | 134 | 5.8 | 51 | 129 | .395 | 8 | 38 | .211 | 24 | 28 | .857 | 16 | 70 | 86 | 3.7 | 41 | 31 | 12 | 14 |
| Milk, Matt | 29 | 28 | 283 | 9.8 | 49 | 1.7 | 23 | 42 | .548 | 0 | 0 | .000 | 3 | 5 | .600 | 21 | 23 | 44 | 1.5 | 10 | 13 | 15 | 5 |
| Ulmer, Lowell | 26 | 3 | 364 | 14.0 | 91 | 3.5 | 34 | 81 | .420 | 3 | 19 | .158 | 20 | 39 | .513 | 22 | 42 | 64 | 2.5 | 14 | 21 | 9 | 15 |
| Molic, Edon | 2 | 0 | 2 | 1.0 | 2 | 1.0 | 1 | 3 | .333 | 0 | 2 | .000 | 0 | 0 | .000 | 0 | 0 | 0 | 0.0 | 0 | 0 | 0 | 0 |
| Team | | | | | | | | | | | | | | | | 50 | 57 | 107 | | | 18 | | |
| Total | 32 | | 6474 | | 2207 | 69.0 | 781 | 1813 | 0.431 | 195 | 619 | 0.315 | 450 | 659 | 0.683 | 383 | 806 | 1189 | 37.2 | 399 | 421 | 170 | 181 |
| Opponents | 32 | | 6474 | | 2139 | 66.8 | 717 | 1748 | 0.410 | 154 | 463 | 0.333 | 551 | 755 | 0.730 | 331 | 756 | 1087 | 34.0 | 339 | 396 | 105 | 199 |

Legend
| GP | Games played | GS | Games started | Avg | Average per game |
| FG | Field-goals made | FGA | Field-goal attempts | Off | Offensive rebounds |
| Def | Defensive rebounds | A | Assists | TO | Turnovers |
| Blk | Blocks | Stl | Steals | High | Team high |

== Awards and honors ==
Jalen Cannon

- Selected to the 2013–14 Preseason All-NEC Team by NEC Coaches Poll.
- Selected to the College Sports Madness 2013–2014 Northeast Preseason All-Conference Second Team.
- Madness Mid-Major Northeast Conference Players of the Week award (November 4–10, 2013).
- 2013–14 NEC men's basketball first team All-Conference.
- Led the NEC in total rebounds (263) and 8th in points per game (14.9).
- Surpassed 1,000 points scored for career.

Wayne Martin

- Choice Hotels NEC Men's Basketball Rookie of the Week award (November 4–10, 2013). Martin led the Terriers with 17 points against Miami (FL) in his first ever collegiate game. Martin also recorded 8 rebounds, 1 steal and 1 block.
- Choice Hotels NEC Men's Basketball Rookie of the Week award (November 25–December 1, 2013). Martin contributed 12 points against Stony Brook and tipped in the game winning basket with 1.5 seconds left to secure a 70–68 triumph. For the week, he averaged 14.5 points, 6.0 rebounds and shot 72.2 percent from the floor.
- Selected to the 2013–14 NEC men's basketball All-Rookie team.
- 6th in the NEC in blocked shots (43).

Sheldon Hagigal

- Choice Hotels NEC Men's Basketball Co-Rookie of the Week (December 9–15, 2013). For the week, Hagigal averaged 19.0 points, 2.5 rebounds, 3.0 assists and 2.0 steals in a split for St. Francis Brooklyn.
- Choice Hotels NEC Men's Basketball Rookie of the Week (February 3–9, 2014). Hagigal came off the bench to match a career-high with 23 points in just 25 minutes against St. Francis University.

Brent Jones

- Choice Hotels NEC Men's Basketball Player of the Week (February 24–March 2, 2014). Jones averaged a double-double in a pair of Terrier victories to close out the regular season.
- 3rd in the NEC in assists (187) and 2nd in Assist-to-Turnover ratio (2.7).

Amdy Fall

- 3rd in the NEC in blocked shots (55).

Ben Mockford

- 9th in the NEC in three point percent (40.7) and 3rd in 3 pointers made (87).
- Surpassed 1,000 points scored for career.

== See also ==
- 2013–14 St. Francis Brooklyn Terriers women's basketball team
