= 2013–14 Saint Francis Red Flash men's basketball team =

American college basketball season

2013–14 Saint Francis Red Flash men's basketball
- Conference: Northeast Conference
- Record: 10–21 (7–9 NEC)
- Head coach: Rob Krimmel (2nd season)
- Assistant coaches: Mike Summey; Joey Goodson; Eric Taylor
- Home arena: DeGol Arena

2013–14 Northeast Conference men's basketball standings
	Conf.				Overall
Team	W		L	PCT	W		L	PCT
Robert Morris	14	–	2	.875	22	–	14	.611
Wagner	12	–	4	.750	19	–	12	.613
Bryant	10	–	6	.625	18	–	14	.563
St. Francis Brooklyn	9	–	7	.563	18	–	14	.563
Mount St. Mary's †	9	–	7	.563	16	–	17	.485
Central Connecticut	7	–	9	.438	11	–	19	.367
Saint Francis	7	–	9	.438	10	–	21	.323
Fairleigh Dickinson	6	–	10	.375	10	–	21	.323
LIU Brooklyn	4	–	12	.250	9	–	20	.310
Sacred Heart	2	–	14	.125	5	–	26	.161
† 2014 NEC tournament winner

The 2013–14 Saint Francis Red Flash men's basketball team represented Saint Francis University during the 2013–14 NCAA Division I men's basketball season. The Red Flash, led by second year head coach Rob Krimmel, played their home games at the DeGol Arena and were members of the Northeast Conference. They finished the season 10–21, 7–9 in NEC play to finish in a tie for sixth place. They advanced to the semifinals of the NEC tournament where they lost to Robert Morris.

== Roster ==
Number	Name	Position	Height	Weight	Year	Hometown
2	Malik Harmon	Guard	5–11	194	Freshman	Queens, New York
5	Stephon Whyatt	Guard	6–1	155	Junior	Jersey City, New Jersey
10	Dalton Cesarz	Guard	6–1	165	Freshman	Nanty Glo, Pennsylvania
11	Ben Millaud-Meunier	Guard	6–1	185	Sophomore	Montreal, Quebec, Canada
12	Greg Brown	Guard	6–2	183	Sophomore	Odenton, Maryland
14	Dominique Major	Guard	5–9	167	Junior	Woodbridge, Virginia
15	Earl Brown	Forward	6–6	206	Junior	Philadelphia, Pennsylvania
20	Aric Gresko	Guard	5–10	165	Sophomore	Clymer, Pennsylvania
21	Stephon Mosley	Forward	6–6	212	Sophomore	West Orange, New Jersey
22	Ollie Jackson	Guard	6–3	163	Junior	Dallas, Texas
24	Matthew Mazzara	Guard	5–11	192	Junior	State College, Pennsylvania
30	Patrick Wrencher	Forward	6–6	250	Freshman	West Chester, Ohio
32	Georgios Angelou	Guard	6–1	185	Freshman	Halkida, Greece
40	Ronnie Drinnon	Forward	6–7	225	Sophomore	Jamestown, Ohio

== Schedule ==
Date time, TV	Opponent	Result	Record	Site (attendance) city, state
Regular season
11/08/2013*; 8:30 pm	at Fordham	L 67–87	1–0	Rose Hill Gymnasium (2,036); Bronx, NY
11/11/2013*; 7:00 pm	vs. Navy	W 60–57	1–1	Cambria County War Memorial Arena (2,838); Johnstown, PA
11/13/2013*; 7:00 pm	at Dayton	L 56–70	1–2	University of Dayton Arena (12,002); Dayton, OH
11/16/2013*; 7:00 pm	at Bucknell	L 50–72	1–3	Sojka Pavilion (3,262); Lewisburg, PA
11/19/2013*; 7:00 pm	at George Mason	L 46–58	1–4	Patriot Center (4,013); Fairfax, VA
11/23/2013*; 2:00 pm	at Colgate	L 64–81	1–5	Cotterell Court (523); Hamilton, NY
11/30/2013*; 2:00 pm	American	L 43–75	1–6	DeGol Arena (942); Loretto, PA
12/04/2013*; 7:00 pm	Lehigh	L 50–57	1–7	DeGol Arena (904); Loretto, PA
12/07/2013*; 4:00 pm	at Cornell	W 72–62	2–7	Newman Arena (1,241); Ithaca, NY
12/17/2013*; 7:00 pm	Duquesne	L 71–78	2–8	DeGol Arena (725); Loretto, PA
12/22/2013*; 2:00 pm	at Drexel	L 49–59	2–9	Daskalakis Athletic Center (1,523); Philadelphia, PA
12/31/2013*; 6:00 pm	at Denver	L 61–83	2–10	Magness Arena (2,076); Denver, CO
01/04/2014*; 2:00 pm	NJIT	L 56–64	2–11	DeGol Arena (726); Loretto, PA
01/09/2014; 7:00 pm	at Bryant	L 67–77	2–12 (0–1)	Chace Athletic Center (877); Smithfield, RI
01/11/2014; 1:00 pm	at Central Connecticut	W 75–67	3–12 (1–1)	William H. Detrick Gymnasium (N/A); New Britain, CT
01/16/2014; 7:00 pm	at Robert Morris	L 68–73	3–13 (1–2)	Charles L. Sewall Center (1,221); Moon Township, PA
01/18/2014; 2:00 pm	Wagner	L 50–56	3–14 (1–3)	DeGol Arena (1,012); Loretto, PA
01/23/2014; 7:00 pm	Mount St. Mary's	L 77–83	3–15 (1–4)	DeGol Arena (714); Loretto, PA
01/25/2014; 2:00 pm	Sacred Heart	W 68–66	4–15 (2–4)	DeGol Arena (831); Loretto, PA
01/30/2014; 7:00 pm	Central Connecticut	W 69–63	5–15 (3–4)	DeGol Arena (832); Loretto, PA
02/01/2014; 2:00 pm	Fairleigh Dickinson	W 83–75	6–15 (4–4)	DeGol Arena (1,019); Loretto, PA
02/06/2014; 7:00 pm	at St. Francis Brooklyn	L 52–78	6–16 (4–5)	Generoso Pope Athletic Complex (373); Brooklyn, NY
02/08/2014; 4:30 pm	at LIU Brooklyn	W 74–58	7–16 (5–5)	Wellness, Recreation & Athletics Center (1,067); Brooklyn, NY
02/13/2014; 7:00 pm	Robert Morris	L 60–66	7–17 (5–6)	DeGol Arena (1,119); Loretto, PA
02/15/2014; 7:00 pm	at Fairleigh Dickinson	W 89–82	8–17 (6–6)	Rothman Center (1,214); Hackensack, NJ
02/20/2014; 7:00 pm	St. Francis Brooklyn	L 44–73	8–18 (6–7)	DeGol Arena (1,024); Loretto, PA
02/22/2014; 2:00 pm	LIU Brooklyn	W 83–64	9–18 (7–7)	DeGol Arena (1,627); Loretto, PA
02/27/2014; 7:00 pm	at Wagner	L 45–74	9–19 (7–8)	Spiro Sports Center (1,410); Staten Island, NY
03/01/2014; 4:00 pm	at Mount St. Mary's	L 55–78	9–20 (7–9)	Knott Arena (1,727); Emmitsburg, MD
2014 Northeast Conference tournament
03/05/2014; 7:00 pm	at Bryant; Quarterfinals	W 55–54	10–20	Chace Athletic Center (1,520); Smithfield, RI
03/08/2014; 2:00 pm, MSG+/FCS	at Robert Morris; Semifinals	L 57–60	10–21	Charles L. Sewall Center (1,739); Moon Township, PA
*Non-conference game. ^{#}Rankings from AP Poll. (#) Tournament seedings in parentheses. All times are in Eastern Time..
