= 2013–14 Fairleigh Dickinson Knights men's basketball team =

American college basketball season

2013–14 Fairleigh Dickinson Knights men's basketball
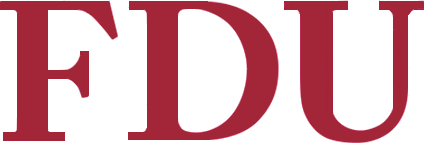
- Conference: Northeast Conference
- Record: 10–21 (6–10 NEC)
- Head coach: Greg Herenda (1st season)
- Associate head coach: Bruce Hamburger
- Assistant coaches: Zak Boisvert; Dwayne Lee
- Home arena: Rothman Center

2013–14 Northeast Conference men's basketball standings
	Conf.				Overall
Team	W		L	PCT	W		L	PCT
Robert Morris	14	–	2	.875	22	–	14	.611
Wagner	12	–	4	.750	19	–	12	.613
Bryant	10	–	6	.625	18	–	14	.563
St. Francis Brooklyn	9	–	7	.563	18	–	14	.563
Mount St. Mary's †	9	–	7	.563	16	–	17	.485
Central Connecticut	7	–	9	.438	11	–	19	.367
Saint Francis	7	–	9	.438	10	–	21	.323
Fairleigh Dickinson	6	–	10	.375	10	–	21	.323
LIU Brooklyn	4	–	12	.250	9	–	20	.310
Sacred Heart	2	–	14	.125	5	–	26	.161
† 2014 NEC tournament winner

The 2013–14 Fairleigh Dickinson Knights men's basketball team represented Fairleigh Dickinson University during the 2013–14 NCAA Division I men's basketball season. The team was led by first year head coach Greg Herenda. He is the seventh head coach in the programs history. The Knights played their home games at the Rothman Center and were members of the Northeast Conference. they finished the season 10–21, 6–10 in Northeast Conference play to finish in eighth place. They lost in the quarterfinals of the Northeast Conference tournament to Robert Morris.

== Roster ==
Number	Name	Position	Height	Weight	Year	Hometown
2	Malachi Nix	Guard	5–8	165	Freshman	Evanston, Illinois
3	Matt MacDonald	Guard	6–5	185	Freshman	Buffalo, New York
5	Jayde Dawson	Guard	6–2	185	Freshman	Montreal, Quebec
12	Sidney Sanders Jr.	Guard	5–11	175	Senior	Charleston, South Carolina
13	Scott Kingsley	Guard	6–5	190	Freshman	Chicago, Illinois
20	Xavier Harris	Forward	6–6	230	Sophomore	Philadelphia, Pennsylvania
21	Myles Mann	Forward	6–6	225	Freshman	Atlanta, Georgia
22	Mathias Seilund	Forward	6–7	205	Senior	Dragør, Denmark
24	Mustafaa Jones	Guard	6–3	180	Junior	Philadelphia, Pennsylvania
25	Scooter Gillette	Forward	6–9	225	Graduated	Philadelphia, Pennsylvania
34	Kyle Pearson	Forward	6–5	190	Sophomore	Woodbridge, New Jersey
35	Mike Owona	Forward	6–9	245	Freshman	Baltimore, Maryland

== Schedule ==
Date time, TV	Opponent	Result	Record	Site (attendance) city, state
Regular season
11/08/2013*; 7:00 pm	Caldwell	W 89–71	1–0	Rothman Center (1,200); Hackensack, New Jersey
11/10/2013*; 4:00 pm	at Hofstra	L 58–80	1–1	Mack Sports Complex (1,384); Hempstead, New York
11/15/2013*; 7:00 pm	at Hartford	L 60–74	1–2	Chase Arena at Reich Family Pavilion (1,747); West Hartford, Connecticut
11/18/2013*; 11:00 pm, ESPNU	No. 5 Arizona; NIT Season Tip-Off	L 50–100	1–3	McKale Center (13,529); Tucson, Arizona
11/19/2013*; 8:00 pm	vs. Metro State; NIT Season Tip-Off	L 76–87	1–4	McKale Center (13,354); Tucson, Arizona
11/23/2013*; 7:00 pm	Saint Peter's	L 63–67	1–5	Rothman Center (720); Hackensack, New Jersey
11/25/2013*; 5:00 pm	vs. Norfolk State; NIT Season Tip-Off	L 62–70	1–6	The RAC (392); New Brunswick, New Jersey
11/26/2013*; 7:30	at Rutgers; NIT Season Tip-Off	W 73–72	2–6	The RAC (466); New Brunswick, New Jersey
12/01/2013*; 2:00 pm, FS1	at Seton Hall	W 58–54	3–6	Prudential Center (6,286); Newark, New Jersey
12/04/2013*; 7:00 pm	at Stony Brook	L 62–77	3–7	Stony Brook Arena (1,224); Stony Brook, New York
12/07/2013*; 7:00 pm	at Princeton	L 55–77	3–8	Jadwin Gymnasium (1,952); Princeton, New Jersey
12/09/2013*; 7:00 pm, BTN	at No. 23 Iowa	L 59–92	3–9	Carver–Hawkeye Arena (13,501); Iowa City, Iowa
12/21/2013*; 4:00 pm	at Columbia	L 59–82	3–10	Levien Gymnasium (626); New York City, New York
01/05/2014*; 4:00 pm	Hofstra	W 86–67	4–10	Rothman Center (623); Hackensack, New Jersey
01/09/2014; 7:00 pm	Mount St. Mary's	W 85–79	5–10 (1–0)	Rothman Center (709); Hackensack, New Jersey
01/11/2014; 2:00 pm	at Sacred Heart	L 67–71	5–11 (1–1)	William H. Pitt Center (233); Fairfield, Connecticut
01/16/2014; 7:00 pm	LIU Brooklyn	W 89–67	6–11 (2–1)	Wellness, Recreation & Athletics Center (1,007); Brooklyn, New York
01/18/2014; 3:00 pm	Bryant	L 68–95	6–12 (2–2)	Rothman Center (718); Hackensack, New Jersey
01/23/2014; 7:00 pm	St. Francis Brooklyn	W 86–85	7–12 (3–2)	Rothman Center (523); Hackensack, New Jersey
01/25/2014; 4:30 pm	Central Connecticut	W 86–73	8–12 (4–2)	Rothman Center (625); Hackensack, New Jersey
01/30/2014; 7:00 pm	at Mount St. Mary's	L 82–87 ^{OT}	8–13 (4–3)	Knott Arena (1,142); Emmitsburg, Maryland
02/01/2014; 2:00 pm	at Saint Francis (PA)	L 75–83	8–14 (4–4)	DeGol Arena (1,019); Loretto, Pennsylvania
02/06/2014; 7:00 pm	at Wagner	L 68–75	8–15 (4–5)	Spiro Sports Center (1,206); Staten Island, New York
02/08/2014; 1:00 pm, MSG/CSNNE/FCS	at Central Connecticut	L 86–91 ^{OT}	8–16 (4–6)	William H. Detrick Gymnasium (N/A); New Britain, Connecticut
02/15/2014; 4:30 pm, MSG/FCS/Root	St. Francis (PA)	L 82–89	8–17 (4–7)	Rothman Center (1,214); Hackensack, New Jersey
02/20/2014; 7:00 pm	at Bryant	W 63–52	9–17 (5–7)	Chace Athletic Center (1,096); Smithfield, Rhode Island
02/22/2014; 4:00 pm	Sacred Heart	W 73–66	10–17 (6–7)	Rothman Center (722); Hackensack, New Jersey
02/24/2014; 7:00 pm	Wagner; Postponed from 2/13	L 64–67	10–18 (6–8)	Rothman Center (724); Hackensack, New Jersey
02/27/2014; 7:00 pm	Robert Morris	L 64–69	10–19 (6–9)	Rothman Center (827); Hackensack, New Jersey
03/01/2014; 5:00 pm	at St. Francis Brooklyn	L 56–79	10–20 (6–10)	Generoso Pope Athletic Complex (634); Brooklyn, New York
2014 Northeast Conference tournament
03/05/2014; 7:00 pm	at Robert Morris; Quarterfinals	L 53–60	10–21	Charles L. Sewall Center (1,117); Moon Township, Pennsylvania
*Non-conference game. ^{#}Rankings from AP Poll. (#) Tournament seedings in parentheses. All times are in Eastern Time..
