= 2013–14 Bryant Bulldogs men's basketball team =

American college basketball season

2013–14 Bryant Bulldogs men's basketball
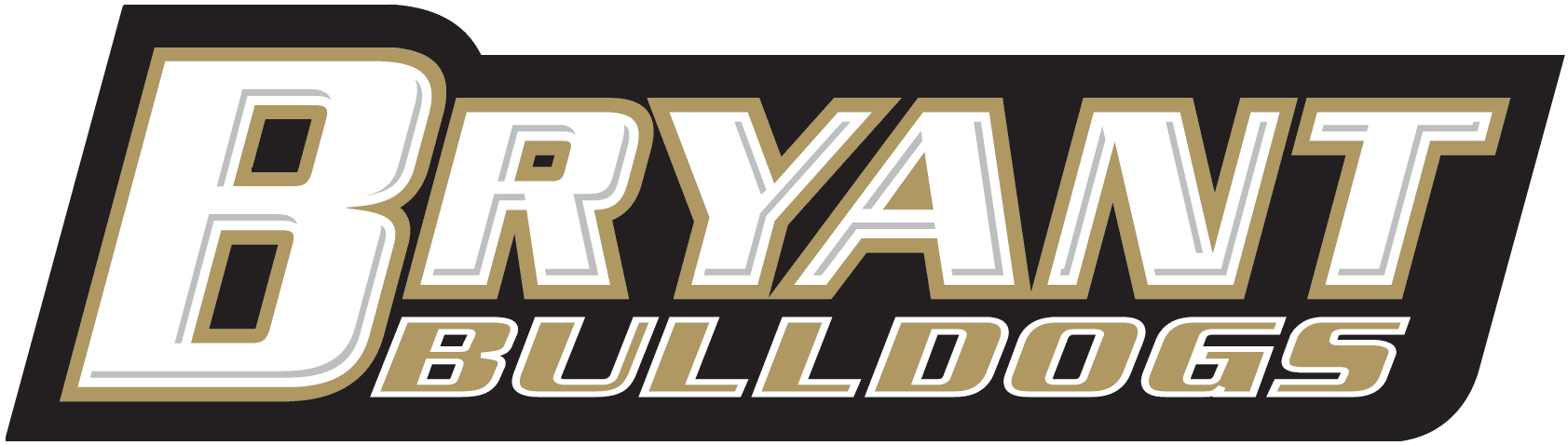
- Conference: Northeast Conference
- Record: 18–14 (10–6 NEC)
- Head coach: Tim O'Shea (6th season)
- Assistant coaches: Happy Dobbs; Al Skinner; Chris Burns
- Home arena: Chace Athletic Center

2013–14 Northeast Conference men's basketball standings
	Conf.				Overall
Team	W		L	PCT	W		L	PCT
Robert Morris	14	–	2	.875	22	–	14	.611
Wagner	12	–	4	.750	19	–	12	.613
Bryant	10	–	6	.625	18	–	14	.563
St. Francis Brooklyn	9	–	7	.563	18	–	14	.563
Mount St. Mary's †	9	–	7	.563	16	–	17	.485
Central Connecticut	7	–	9	.438	11	–	19	.367
Saint Francis	7	–	9	.438	10	–	21	.323
Fairleigh Dickinson	6	–	10	.375	10	–	21	.323
LIU Brooklyn	4	–	12	.250	9	–	20	.310
Sacred Heart	2	–	14	.125	5	–	26	.161
† 2014 NEC tournament winner

The 2013–2014 Bryant Bulldogs men's basketball team represented Bryant University during the 2013–14 NCAA Division I men's basketball season. The team was led by sixth year head coach Tim O'Shea and played their home games at the Chace Athletic Center. They were members of the Northeast Conference. They finished the season at 18–14 overall and 10–6 in conference play, for a third-place finish. Bryant, the third seed, was upset by Saint Francis (PA), the sixth seed, in the NEC tournament quarterfinals.

== Roster ==
Number	Name	Position	Height	Weight	Year	Hometown
0	Zach Chionuma	Guard	6–5	185	Junior	Jamesville, New York
1	Corey Maynard	Guard	6–3	185	Senior	Adelaide, Australia
2	Declan Soukup	Guard	6–3	180	Freshman	Melbourne, Australia
3	Bosko Kostur	Guard/Forward	6–7	200	Freshman	Melbourne, Australia
4	Shane McLaughlin	Guard	6–1	185	Sophomore	Old Tappan, New Jersey
5	Terrill Toe	Guard	6–0	165	Freshman	Providence, Rhode Island
10	Joe O'Shea	Guard	6–4	190	Junior	Burlington, Vermont
11	Justin Brickman	Guard	5–9	155	Freshman	San Antonio, Texas
12	Dyami Starks	Guard	6–2	195	Junior	Duluth, Minnesota
14	Andrew Scocca	Forward	6–8	235	Freshman	Melrose, Massachusetts
15	Ellis Williams	Forward	6–8	250	Freshman	Columbus, Ohio
20	Tim McKinney	Guard	6–5	210	Senior	Duxbury, Massachusetts
22	Dan Garvin	Forward	6–6	205	Freshman	Bethel, Connecticut
23	Alex Francis	Forward	6–6	205	Senior	Harlem, New York
34	Curtis Oakley	Forward	6–4	215	Sophomore	South Euclid, Ohio
44	Claybrin McMath	Forward	6–8	210	Senior	Adelaide, Australia

== Schedule ==
Date time, TV	Opponent	Result	Record	Site (attendance) city, state
Regular season
11/09/2013*; 7:00 pm, RTNW/RTRM	at No. 15 Gonzaga	L 76–100	0–1	McCarthey Athletic Center (6,000); Spokane, WA
11/13/2013*; 7:00 pm	at Dartmouth	W 87–77	1–1	Leede Arena (648); Hanover, NH
11/16/2013*; 7:00 pm	Vermont	W 87–64	2–1	Chace Athletic Center (N/A); Smithfield, RI
11/20/2013*; 7:00 pm	at Harvard	L 68–86	2–2	Lavietes Pavilion (1,760); Cambridge, MA
11/24/2013*; 1:00 pm	at New Hampshire	W 60–55	3–2	Lundholm Gym (615); Durham, NH
11/27/2013*; 4:00 pm	Brown	W 70–67	4–2	Chace Athletic Center (939); Smithfield, RI
11/30/2013*; 1:00 pm	Salve Regina	W 82–55	5–2	Chace Athletic Center (469); Smithfield, RI
12/04/2013*; 7:30 pm	at Yale	W 72–64	6–2	Payne Whitney Gymnasium (718); New Haven, CT
12/07/2013*; 1:00 pm	North Dakota State; Gotham Classic	L 62–66	6–3	Chace Athletic Center (2,200); Smithfield, RI
12/09/2013*; 7:00 pm, ESPNU	at Notre Dame; Gotham Classic	L 59–70	6–4	Edmund P. Joyce Center (7,323); South Bend, IN
12/11/2013*; 7:30 pm, BTN	at No. 3 Ohio State; Gotham Classic	L 48–86	6–5	Value City Arena (12,723); Columbus, OH
12/14/2013*; 12:30 pm, OSN	Navy	W 90–80 ^{OT}	7–5	Chace Athletic Center (998); Smithfield, RI
12/21/2013*; 9:30 pm	vs. Delaware; Gotham Classic	L 107–108 ^{OT}	7–6	Madison Square Garden (10,138); New York, NY
12/28/2013*; 2:00 pm	at Binghamton	L 62–67	7–7	Binghamton University Events Center (3,463); Binghamton, NY
12/30/2013*; 7:00 pm, OSN	Lehigh	W 70–68	8–7	Chace Athletic Center (1,143); Smithfield, RI
01/09/2014; 7:00 pm	Saint Francis (PA)	W 77–67	9–7 (1–0)	Chace Athletic Center (877); Smithfield, RI
01/11/2014; 1:00 pm	Robert Morris	L 67–71	9–8 (1–1)	Chace Athletic Center (679); Smithfield, RI
01/16/2014; 7:00 pm, OSN	Sacred Heart	W 85–70	10–8 (2–1)	Chace Athletic Center (858); Smithfield, RI
01/18/2014; 3:00 pm	at Fairleigh Dickinson	W 95–68	11–8 (3–1)	Rothman Center (718); Teaneck, NJ
01/23/2014; 7:00 pm, MSG+/FCS/OSN	LIU Brooklyn	W 87–79	12–8 (4–1)	Chace Athletic Center (1,473); Smithfield, RI
01/25/2014; 1:00 pm, OSN	St. Francis Brooklyn	W 83–79	13–8 (5–1)	Chace Athletic Center (925); Smithfield, RI
01/30/2014; 7:00 pm, ESPNU	at Robert Morris	L 76–79	13–9 (5–2)	Charles L. Sewall Center (2,454); Moon Township, PA
02/02/2014; 2:00 pm	at Sacred Heart	W 76–67	14–9 (6–2)	William H. Pitt Center (480); Fairfield, CT
02/06/2014; 7:00 pm	at Central Connecticut	W 79–68	15–9 (7–2)	William H. Detrick Gymnasium (2,089); New Britain, CT
02/08/2014; 4:00 pm	Mount St. Mary's	W 78–75	16–9 (8–2)	Chace Athletic Center (1,267); Smithfield, RI
02/16/2014; 12:00 pm, CBSSN	at Wagner	L 61–73	16–10 (8–3)	Spiro Sports Center (2,027); Staten Island, NY
02/20/2014; 7:00 pm	Fairleigh Dickinson	L 52–63	16–11 (8–4)	Chace Athletic Center (1,096); Smithfield, RI
02/22/2014; 4:00 pm, OSN	Central Connecticut	W 68–65	17–11 (9–4)	Chace Athletic Center (1,250); Smithfield, RI
02/24/2014; 8:30 pm	at Mount St. Mary's; Postponed from 2/13	L 73–88	17–12 (9–5)	Knott Arena (1,040); Emmitsburg, MD
02/27/2014; 7:00 pm	at St. Francis Brooklyn	L 59–62	17–13 (9–6)	Generoso Pope Athletic Complex (675); Brooklyn, NY
03/01/2014; 2:00 pm	at LIU Brooklyn	W 81–62	18–13 (10–6)	Steinberg Wellness Center (1,357); Brooklyn, NY
2014 Northeast Conference tournament
03/05/2014; 7:00 pm	Saint Francis (PA); Quarterfinals	L 54–55	18–14	Chace Athletic Center (1,520); Smithfield, RI
*Non-conference game. ^{#}Rankings from AP Poll. (#) Tournament seedings in parentheses. All times are in Eastern Time..
