= 2013–14 Sacred Heart Pioneers men's basketball team =

American college basketball season

2013–14 Sacred Heart Pioneers men's basketball
- Conference: Northeast Conference
- Record: 5–26 (2–14 NEC)
- Head coach: Anthony Latina (1st season)
- Assistant coaches: Johnny Kidd; Kevin Papacs
- Home arena: William H. Pitt Center

2013–14 Northeast Conference men's basketball standings
	Conf.				Overall
Team	W		L	PCT	W		L	PCT
Robert Morris	14	–	2	.875	22	–	14	.611
Wagner	12	–	4	.750	19	–	12	.613
Bryant	10	–	6	.625	18	–	14	.563
St. Francis Brooklyn	9	–	7	.563	18	–	14	.563
Mount St. Mary's †	9	–	7	.563	16	–	17	.485
Central Connecticut	7	–	9	.438	11	–	19	.367
Saint Francis	7	–	9	.438	10	–	21	.323
Fairleigh Dickinson	6	–	10	.375	10	–	21	.323
LIU Brooklyn	4	–	12	.250	9	–	20	.310
Sacred Heart	2	–	14	.125	5	–	26	.161
† 2014 NEC tournament winner

The 2013–14 Sacred Heart Pioneers men's basketball team represented Sacred Heart University during the 2013–14 NCAA Division I men's basketball season. This was the Pioneers' 15th season of NCAA Division I basketball, all played in the Northeast Conference. The Pioneers were led by first-year head coach Anthony Latina and played their home games at the William H. Pitt Center. They finished the season 5–26, 2–14 in NEC play to finish in last place. They failed to qualify for the Northeast Basketball Tournament.

== Roster ==
Number	Name	Position	Height	Weight	Year	Hometown
2	Evan Kelley	Guard	6–4	185	Junior	Norwalk, Connecticut
3	Cole Walton	Center	6–11	215	Freshman	Bellevue, Washington
4	Phil Gaetano	Guard	5–10	170	Junior	Wallingford, Connecticut
5	De'von Barnett	Forward	6–5	190	Freshman	Waldorf, Maryland
10	Leo Vincent	Guard	6–0	180	Freshman	Bensalem, Pennsylvania
11	Chris Evans	Guard/forward	6–3	210	Senior	Stamford, Connecticut
12	Louis Montes	Guard/forward	6–5	220	Senior	Brockton, Massachusetts
20	Lewis Cramer	Forward	6–6	205	Sophomore	Seattle, Washington
21	Tavon Bookman	Guard	6–3	175	Freshman	
24	Mostafa Abdel Latif	Forward	6–8	230	Junior	Alexandria, Egypt
30	Eyimofe Edukugho	Forward	6–6	220	Sophomore	Warri, Nigeria
31	Steve Glowiak	Guard	6–3	185	Junior	New Britain, Connecticut
34	Tevin Falzon	Forward	6–7	215	Sophomore	Newton, Massachusetts

Roster:

== Schedule ==
Date time, TV	Opponent	Result	Record	Site (attendance) city, state
Regular season
11/09/2013*; 8:00 pm	vs. Fairfield; Connecticut 6 Classic	L 54–67	0–1	Webster Bank Arena (5,060); Bridgeport, CT
11/13/2013*; 7:00 pm	at Holy Cross	L 118–122 ^{2OT}	0–2	Hart Center (991); Worcester, MA
11/16/2013*; 2:00 pm	Brown	L 73–85	0–3	William H. Pitt Center (577); Fairfield, CT
11/19/2013*; 7:00 pm	at Yale	L 65–80	0–4	Payne Whitney Gymnasium (752); New Haven, CT
11/23/2013*; 4:00 pm	at Fordham	W 85–73	1–4	Rose Hill Gymnasium (2,281); Bronx, NY
11/26/2013*; 7:00 pm	at Boston College	L 67–75	1–5	Conte Forum (2,149); Chestnut Hill, MA
12/01/2013*; 2:00 pm	at Lehigh	L 64–76	1–6	Stabler Arena (941); Bethlehem, PA
12/04/2013*; 7:00 pm	at Hofstra	W 73–59	2–6	Mack Sports Complex (1,128); Hempstead, NY
12/07/2013*; 2:00 pm	Lafayette	L 79–86	2–7	William H. Pitt Center (451); Fairfield, CT
12/15/2013*; 2:00 pm	Hartford	L 72–84	2–8	William H. Pitt Center (249); Fairfield, CT
12/18/2013*; 11:00 pm	at Santa Clara; Las Vegas Classic	L 61–70	2–9	Leavey Center (992); Santa Clara, CA
12/20/2013*; 10:00 pm	at UNLV; Las Vegas Classic	L 50–82	2–10	Thomas & Mack Center (12,235); Paradise, NV
12/22/2013*; 3:00 pm	vs. Radford; Las Vegas Classic	L 78–94	2–11	Orleans Arena (N/A); Paradise, NV
12/23/2013*; 2:30 pm	vs. Florida A&M; Las Vegas Classic	L 70–75	2–12	Orleans Arena (N/A); Paradise, NV
01/04/2014*; 1:00 pm	at New Hampshire	W 66–53	3–12	Lundholm Gym (472); Durham, NH
01/09/2014; 7:00 pm	Robert Morris	L 70–79	3–13 (0–1)	William H. Pitt Center (N/A); Fairfield, CT
01/11/2014; 2:00 pm	Fairleigh Dickinson	W 71–67	4–13 (1–1)	William H. Pitt Center (233); Fairfield, CT
01/16/2014; 7:00 pm	at Bryant	L 70–85	4–14 (1–2)	Chace Athletic Center (858); Smithfield, RI
01/18/2014; 5:00 pm	at St. Francis Brooklyn	L 71–74	4–15 (1–3)	Generoso Pope Athletic Complex (602); Brooklyn, NY
01/23/2014; 7:00 pm	at Robert Morris	L 65–91	4–16 (1–4)	Charles L. Sewall Center (824); Moon Township, PA
01/25/2014; 2:00 pm	at Saint Francis (PA)	L 66–68	4–17 (1–5)	DeGol Arena (831); Loretto, PA
01/30/2014; 7:00 pm	St. Francis Brooklyn	L 78–83	4–18 (1–6)	William H. Pitt Center (407); Fairfield, CT
02/02/2014; 2:00 pm	Bryant	L 67–76	4–19 (1–7)	William H. Pitt Center (480); Fairfield, CT
02/06/2014; 7:00 pm	Mount St. Mary's	L 60–73	4–20 (1–8)	William H. Pitt Center (N/A); Fairfield, CT
02/08/2014; 2:00 pm	Wagner	L 55–62	4–21 (1–9)	William H. Pitt Center (N/A); Fairfield, CT
02/15/2014; 1:00 pm	at Central Connecticut	L 69–74	4–22 (1–10)	William H. Detrick Gymnasium (1,924); New Britain, CT
02/20/2014; 7:00 pm	at Wagner	L 62–74	4–23 (1–11)	Spiro Sports Center (1,301); Staten Island, NY
02/22/2014; 3:00 pm	at Fairleigh Dickinson	L 66–73	4–24 (1–12)	Rothman Center (722); Hackensack, NJ
02/25/2014; 7:00 pm	LIU Brooklyn; Postponed from 2/13	L 75–80	4–25 (1–13)	William H. Pitt Center (173); Fairfield, CT
02/27/2014; 7:00 pm	at Mount St. Mary's	W 72–65	5–25 (2–13)	Knott Arena (1,507); Emmitsburg, MD
03/01/2014; 3:30 pm	at Central Connecticut	L 70–73	5–26 (2–14)	William H. Pitt Center (595); Fairfield, CT
*Non-conference game. ^{#}Rankings from AP Poll. (#) Tournament seedings in parentheses. All times are in Eastern Time..
