= 2013–14 LIU Brooklyn Blackbirds men's basketball team =

American college basketball season

2013–14 LIU Brooklyn Blackbirds men's basketball
- Conference: Northeast Conference
- Record: 9–20 (4–12 NEC)
- Head coach: Jack Perri (2nd season)
- Assistant coaches: Mark Calzonetti; Jason Harris; Chuck Bridge
- Home arena: Athletic, Recreation & Wellness Center; Barclays Center

2013–14 Northeast Conference men's basketball standings
	Conf.				Overall
Team	W		L	PCT	W		L	PCT
Robert Morris	14	–	2	.875	22	–	14	.611
Wagner	12	–	4	.750	19	–	12	.613
Bryant	10	–	6	.625	18	–	14	.563
St. Francis Brooklyn	9	–	7	.563	18	–	14	.563
Mount St. Mary's †	9	–	7	.563	16	–	17	.485
Central Connecticut	7	–	9	.438	11	–	19	.367
Saint Francis	7	–	9	.438	10	–	21	.323
Fairleigh Dickinson	6	–	10	.375	10	–	21	.323
LIU Brooklyn	4	–	12	.250	9	–	20	.310
Sacred Heart	2	–	14	.125	5	–	26	.161
† 2014 NEC tournament winner

The 2013–14 LIU Brooklyn Blackbirds men's basketball team represented The Brooklyn Campus of Long Island University during the 2013–14 NCAA Division I men's basketball season. The Blackbirds, led by second year head coach Jack Perri, played their home games at the Athletic, Recreation & Wellness Center, with three home games at the Barclays Center, and were members of the Northeast Conference. They finished the season 9–20, 4–12 in NEC play to finish in ninth place and failed to qualify for the Northeast Conference Tournament.

== Roster ==
2013–14 Long Island Blackbirds men's basketball team
Players
Coaches

Pos.	#	Name	Height	Weight	Year	Hometown
G	00	D.J. Griggs	6 ft 0 in (1.83 m)	170 lb (77 kg)	So	Lake Jackson, Texas
G/F	01	Gilbert Parga	6 ft 4 in (1.93 m)	205 lb (93 kg)	Jr	Los Angeles, California
G	03	Iverson Fleming	6 ft 1 in (1.85 m)	160 lb (73 kg)	Fr	North Brunswick, New Jersey
G	4	Garrell Martin	6 ft 2 in (1.88 m)	175 lb (79 kg)	Jr	Bronx, New York
G/F	5	Troy Joseph	6 ft 6 in (1.98 m)	200 lb (91 kg)	Jr	Toronto, Ontario
G	11	Brandon Thompson	6 ft 1 in (1.85 m)	185 lb (84 kg)	Sr	San Antonio, Texas
G	15	Jason Brickman	6 ft 0 in (1.83 m)	165 lb (75 kg)	Sr	San Antonio, Texas
F	20	Chris Carter	6 ft 7 in (2.01 m)	185 lb (84 kg)	Jr	Raleigh, North Carolina
G/F	23	Gilbert Parga	6 ft 4 in (1.93 m)	205 lb (93 kg)	Sr	Pico Rivera, California
G	24	Kedar Edwards	6 ft 4 in (1.93 m)	190 lb (86 kg)	So	Brooklyn, New York
F	32	Nura Zanna	6 ft 7 in (2.01 m)	215 lb (98 kg)	Fr	Coral Springs, Florida
F	33	E.J. Reed	6 ft 6 in (1.98 m)	200 lb (91 kg)	So	Mesquite, Texas
F	42	Julian Boyd	6 ft 7 in (2.01 m)	230 lb (104 kg)		San Antonio, Texas

Head coach

- Jack Perri (Bentley)

Assistant coach(es)

- Mark Calzonetti (Bentley)
- Jason Harris (Rhode Island College)
- Chuck Bridge (Springfield)

Legend

- (C) Team captain
- (S) Suspended
- (I) Ineligible
- (W) Walk-on
- Injured
- Current redshirt

Roster
Last update: 2013-10-08

== Schedule ==
Date time, TV	Opponent	Result	Record	Site (attendance) city, state
Regular Season
11/09/2013*; 12:00 pm	Saint Peter's	W 87–80	1–0	Barclays Center (2,145); Brooklyn, NY
11/12/2013*; 6:00 pm	at No. 23 Indiana; 2K Sports Classic	L 72–73	1–1	Assembly Hall (17,096); Bloomington, IN
11/22/2013*; 10:00 pm	at UC Irvine; 2K Sports Classic	L 64–84	1–2	Bren Events Center (2,379); Irvine, CA
11/23/2013*; 6:00 pm	vs. Eastern Washington; 2K Sports Classic	L 70–102	1–3	Bren Events Center (N/A); Irvine, CA
11/24/2013*; 4:30 pm	vs. Boston University; 2K Sports Classic	L 57–72	1–4	Bren Events Center (N/A); Irvine, CA
12/01/2013*; 2:00 pm	Norfolk State	W 74–72	2–4	Wellness, Recreation & Athletics Center (1,314); Brooklyn, NY
12/05/2013*; 7:00 pm, FS1	at Seton Hall	L 81–92	2–5	Prudential Center (6,112); Newark, NJ
12/09/2013*; 7:30 pm	at Lehigh	L 69–76	2–6	Stabler Arena (N/A); Bethlehem, PA
12/12/2013*; 7:00 pm	at NJIT	W 96–93	3–6	Fleisher Center (777); Newark, NJ
12/18/2013*; 7:00 pm	Lamar	W 82–79	4–6	Wellness, Recreation & Athletics Center (1,237); Brooklyn, NY
12/21/2013*; 5:30 pm	vs. Temple; Brooklyn Hoops Holiday Invitational	L 65–101	4–7	Barclays Center (N/A); Brooklyn, NY
12/28/2013*; 5:00 pm	at Sam Houston State	L 78–82	4–8	Bernard Johnson Coliseum (682); Huntsville, TX
12/30/2013*; 8:00 pm	at Texas State	W 73–64	5–8	Strahan Coliseum (1,585); San Marcos, TX
01/09/2014; 7:00 pm	at St. Francis Brooklyn	L 64–78	5–9 (0–1)	Generoso Pope Athletic Complex (1,117); Brooklyn Heights, NY
01/11/2014; 4:00 pm	at Wagner	L 70–84	5–10 (0–2)	Spiro Sports Center (1,845); Staten Island, NY
01/16/2014; 7:00 pm	Fairleigh Dickinson	L 67–89	5–11 (0–3)	Athletic, Recreation & Wellness Center (1,007); Brooklyn, NY
01/18/2014; 3:30 pm	at Central Connecticut	W 62–61	6–11 (1–3)	William H. Detrick Gymnasium (1,911); New Britain, CT
01/23/2014; 7:00 pm	at Bryant	L 79–87	6–12 (1–4)	Chace Athletic Center (1,473); Smithfield, RI
01/25/2014; 4:30 pm	Mount St. Mary's	W 75–71	7–12 (2–4)	Athletic, Recreation & Wellness Center (1,421); Brooklyn, NY
01/30/2014; 7:00 pm	Wagner	L 68–75	7–13 (2–5)	Athletic, Recreation & Wellness Center (1,271); Brooklyn, NY
02/01/2014; 2:30 pm	at Mount St. Mary's	L 92–95	7–14 (2–6)	Knott Arena (2,276); Emmitsburg, MD
02/06/2014; 7:00 pm	Robert Morris	L 56–65	7–15 (2–7)	Athletic, Recreation & Wellness Center (1,145); Brooklyn, NY
02/08/2014; 4:30 pm	Saint Francis (PA)	L 58–74	7–16 (2–8)	Athletic, Recreation & Wellness Center (1,067); Brooklyn, NY
02/16/2014; 2:00 pm	vs. St. Francis Brooklyn; Battle of Brooklyn	W 69–68	8–16 (3–8)	Barclay's Center (2,767); Brooklyn, NY
02/20/2014; 7:00 pm	at Robert Morris	L 64–73	8–17 (3–9)	Charles L. Sewall Center (1,299); Moon Township, PA
02/22/2014; 2:00 pm	at Saint Francis (PA)	L 64–83	8–18 (3–10)	DeGol Arena (1,627); Loretto, PA
02/25/2014; 7:00 pm	at Sacred Heart	W 80–75	9–18 (4–10)	William H. Pitt Center (173); Fairfield, CT
02/27/2014; 7:00 pm	Central Connecticut	L 82–86 ^{OT}	9–19 (4–11)	Athletic, Recreation & Wellness Center (1,073); Brooklyn, NY
03/01/2014; 2:00 pm	Bryant	L 62–81	9–20 (4–12)	Athletic, Recreation & Wellness Center (1,357); Brooklyn, NY
*Non-conference game. ^{#}Rankings from AP Poll. (#) Tournament seedings in parentheses. All times are in Eastern Time.
