= 2013–14 Central Connecticut Blue Devils men's basketball team =

American college basketball season

2013–14 Central Connecticut Blue Devils men's basketball
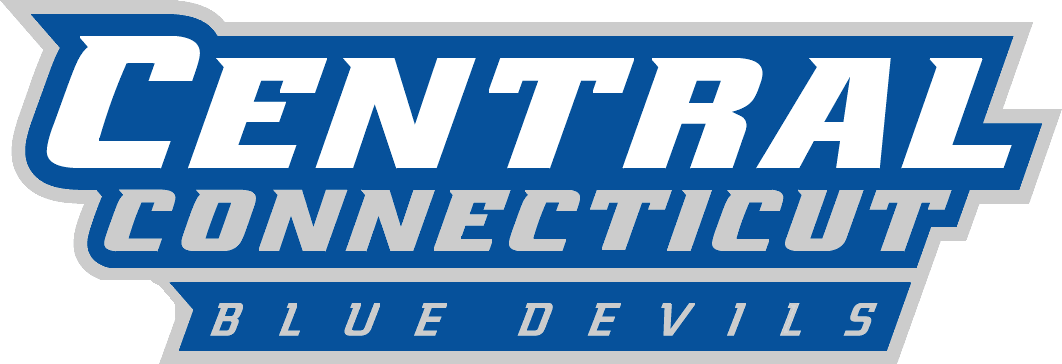
- Conference: Northeast Conference
- Record: 11–19 (7–9 NEC)
- Head coach: Howie Dickenman (18th season)
- Assistant coaches: Sean Ryan; Steve Treffiletti; Jamaal Wagner; Sean McCurdy
- Home arena: William H. Detrick Gymnasium

2013–14 Northeast Conference men's basketball standings
	Conf.				Overall
Team	W		L	PCT	W		L	PCT
Robert Morris	14	–	2	.875	22	–	14	.611
Wagner	12	–	4	.750	19	–	12	.613
Bryant	10	–	6	.625	18	–	14	.563
St. Francis Brooklyn	9	–	7	.563	18	–	14	.563
Mount St. Mary's †	9	–	7	.563	16	–	17	.485
Central Connecticut	7	–	9	.438	11	–	19	.367
Saint Francis	7	–	9	.438	10	–	21	.323
Fairleigh Dickinson	6	–	10	.375	10	–	21	.323
LIU Brooklyn	4	–	12	.250	9	–	20	.310
Sacred Heart	2	–	14	.125	5	–	26	.161
† 2014 NEC tournament winner

The 2013–14 Central Connecticut Blue Devils men's basketball team represented Central Connecticut State University during the 2013–14 NCAA Division I men's basketball season. The Blue Devils, led by 18th year head coach Howie Dickenman, played their home games at the William H. Detrick Gymnasium and were members of the Northeast Conference. They finished the season 11–19, 7–9 in NEC play to finish in a tie for sixth place and lost in the quarterfinals of the Northeast Conference tournament to Wagner.

== Roster ==
Number	Name	Position	Height	Weight	Year	Hometown
1	Kyle Vinales	Guard	6–1	180	Junior	Detroit, Michigan
2	Juwan Newmen	Forward	6–8	215	Junior	Baltimore, Maryland
3	Andrew Hurd	Guard	5–10	160	Sophomore	Windsor, Connecticut
4	Ahmaad Wilson	Guard	5–11	175	Freshman	Randallstown, Maryland
5	De'Angelo Speech	Guard	6–5	185	Senior	Oak Park, Illinois
11	Malcolm McMillan	Guard	6–0	180	Junior	Baltimore, Maryland
12	Khalen Kumberlander	Guard	6–3	185	Freshman	Washington, D.C.
13	Greg Andrade	Guard	6–0	180	Junior	Windsor, Connecticut
21	Matt Mobley	Guard	6–1	175	Freshman	Worcester, Massachusetts
22	Faronte Drakeford	Forward	6–7	215	Junior	Wilmington, North Carolina
24	Kevin Mickle	Forward	6–7	220	Freshman	Brooklyn, New York
25	Matt Hunter	Guard	6–5	190	Senior	Detroit, Michigan
33	Terrell Allen	Forward	6–6	225	Senior	Virginia Beach, Virginia
34	Brandon Peel	Forward	6–7	200	Sophomore	Forestville, Maryland

== Schedule ==
Date time, TV	Opponent	Result	Record	Site (attendance) city, state
Regular season
11/09/2013*; 5:30 pm	vs. Yale; Connecticut 6 Classic	L 77–93	0–1	Webster Bank Arena (N/A); Bridgeport, CT
11/13/2013*; 7:00 pm	at Purdue	L 73–109	0–2	Mackey Arena (11,966); West Lafayette, IN
11/16/2013*; 4:00 pm	at Northeastern	L 69–83	0–3	Matthews Arena (1,434); Boston, MA
11/23/2013*; 8:00 pm	Rider	L 73–89	0–4	William H. Detrick Gymnasium (1,615); New Britain, CT
11/26/2013*; 7:00 pm	at NJIT	W 74–71	1–4	Fleisher Center (N/A); Newark, NJ
11/30/2013*; 2:00 pm	at Brown	L 61–72	1–5	Pizzitola Sports Center (554); Providence, RI
12/04/2013*; 7:00 pm	New Hampshire	W 65–56	2–5	William H. Detrick Gymnasium (1,536); New Britain, CT
12/07/2013*; 4:30 pm	at No. 5 Ohio State	L 56–74	2–6	Value City Arena (13,640); Columbus, OH
12/10/2013*; 7:00 pm	Hartford; Rivalry	W 73–59	3–6	William H. Detrick Gymnasium (1,654); New Britain, CT
12/15/2013*; 1:00 pm	at Hofstra	L 67–72	3–7	Mack Sports Complex (1,458); Hempstead, NY
12/21/2013*; 1:00 pm	Coastal Carolina	L 62–65	3–8	William H. Detrick Gymnasium (N/A); New Britain, CT
12/29/2013*; 1:00 pm	Alburtus Magnus	W 85–82	4–8	William H. Detrick Gymnasium (N/A); New Britain, CT
01/03/2014*; 7:00 pm	at Coastal Carolina	L 67–86	4–9	HTC Center (1,520); Conway, SC
01/09/2014; 7:00 pm	Wagner	L 59–88	4–10 (0–1)	William H. Detrick Gymnasium (1,411); New Britain, CT
01/11/2014; 1:00 pm	Saint Francis (PA)	L 67–75	4–11 (0–2)	William H. Detrick Gymnasium (N/A); New Britain, CT
01/16/2014; 7:00 pm	St. Francis Brooklyn	L 66–76	4–12 (0–3)	William H. Detrick Gymnasium (1,115); New Britain, CT
01/18/2014; 3:30 pm	LIU Brooklyn	L 61–62	4–13 (0–4)	William H. Detrick Gymnasium (1,911); New Britain, CT
01/23/2014; 7:00 pm	at Wagner	W 87–83	5–13 (1–4)	Spiro Sports Center (1,614); Staten Island, NY
01/25/2014; 4:30 pm	at Fairleigh Dickinson	L 73–86	5–14 (1–5)	Rothman Center (625); Hackensack, NJ
01/30/2014; 7:00 pm	at St. Francis (PA)	L 63–69	5–15 (1–6)	DeGol Arena (832); Loretto, PA
02/01/2014; 4:00 pm	at Robert Morris	W 74–73	6–15 (2–6)	Charles L. Sewall Center (1,473); Moon Township, PA
02/06/2014; 7:00 pm	Bryant	L 68–79	6–16 (2–7)	William H. Detrick Gymnasium (2,089); New Britain, CT
02/08/2014; 1:00 pm, MSG/CSNNE/FCS	Fairleigh Dickinson	W 91–86 ^{OT}	7–16 (3–7)	William H. Detrick Gymnasium (N/A); New Britain, CT
02/15/2014; 1:00 pm	Sacred Heart	W 74–69	8–16 (4–7)	William H. Detrick Gymnasium (1,924); New Britain, CT
02/18/2014; 7:00 pm, MSG/FCS/Cox	at St. Francis Brooklyn; Postponed from 2/13	W 73–71	9–16 (5–7)	Generoso Pope Athletic Complex (378); Brooklyn, NY
02/20/2014; 7:00 pm, MSG/FCS/Cox/MASN	Mount St. Mary's	L 76–87	9–17 (5–8)	William H. Detrick Gymnasium (1,849); New Britain, CT
02/22/2014; 4:00 pm	at Bryant	L 65–68	9–18 (5–9)	Chace Athletic Center (1,250); Smithfield, RI
02/27/2014; 7:00 pm	at LIU Brooklyn	W 86–82 ^{OT}	10–18 (6–9)	Wellness, Recreation & Athletics Center (1,073); Brooklyn, NY
03/01/2014; 2:00 pm	at Sacred Heart	W 73–70	11–18 (7–9)	William H. Pitt Center (595); Fairfield, CT
2014 Northeast Conference tournament
03/05/2014; 7:00 pm	at Wagner; Quarterfinals	L 59–83	11–19	Spiro Sports Center (1,003); Staten Island, NY
*Non-conference game. ^{#}Rankings from AP Poll. (#) Tournament seedings in parentheses. All times are in Eastern Time.
