= 2013–14 NJIT Highlanders men's basketball team =

American college basketball season

2013–14 NJIT Highlanders men's basketball
- Conference: Independent
- Record: 13–16
- Head coach: Jim Engles (6th season)
- Assistant coaches: Brian Kennedy; Jesse Agel; Michael Brown
- Home arena: Fleisher Center

2013–14 NCAA Division I men's basketball independents standings
| | Conf. | | | | Overall |
| Team | W | | L | PCT | W | | L | PCT |
|---|---|---|---|---|---|---|---|---|
| NJIT | | – | | – | 13 | – | 16 | .448 |

The 2013–14 NJIT Highlanders men's basketball team represented New Jersey Institute of Technology during the 2013–14 NCAA Division I men's basketball season. The Highlanders, led by sixth year head coach Jim Engles, played their home games at the Fleisher Center and were in their first year as an Independent. They finished the season 13–16.

== Roster ==
| Number | Name | Position | Height | Weight | Year | Hometown |
|---|---|---|---|---|---|---|
| 0 | Ky Howard | Guard | 6–3 | 185 | Sophomore | Philadelphia, Pennsylvania |
| 1 | Jake Duncan | Guard | 6–4 | 190 | Freshman | Williamsburg, Virginia |
| 2 | Tim Coleman | Guard | 6–5 | 210 | Freshman | Union, New Jersey |
| 3 | Nigel Sydnor | Guard | 6–2 | 220 | Sophomore | Baltimore, Maryland |
| 5 | Damon Lynn | Guard | 5–11 | 165 | Freshman | Hillside, New Jersey |
| 10 | Daquan Holiday | Forward | 6–8 | 205 | Junior | Allentown, Pennsylvania |
| 11 | Winfield Willis | Guard | 6–0 | 180 | Junior | Baltimore, Maryland |
| 14 | Montana Mayfield | Guard | 6–0 | 170 | Freshman | Wyncote, Pennsylvania |
| 15 | Terrence Smith | Forward | 6–6 | 195 | Sophomore | Fort Lauderdale, Florida |
| 21 | Quentin Bastian | Forward | 6–6 | 240 | Senior | Port Richey, Florida |
| 22 | Odera Nweke | Forward/Guard | 6–5 | 210 | Junior | Richmond, Texas |
| 24 | Emmanuel Tselentakis | Guard | 6–5 | 205 | Sophomore | Thessaloniki, Greece |
| 25 | Rob Ukawuba | Guard | 6–3 | 210 | Freshman | East Brunswick, New Jersey |
| 33 | Vlad Shustov | Forward | 6–10 | 225 | Freshman | Tomsk, Russia |

== Schedule ==
| Date time, TV | Opponent | Result | Record | Site (attendance) city, state |
Regular Season
| 11/08/2013*; 8:00 pm | at Tulane | L 64-75 | 0–1 | Devlin Fieldhouse (1,480); New Orleans, LA |
| 11/12/2013*; 7:00 pm | at Albany | L 65–71 | 0–2 | SEFCU Arena (3,141); Albany, NY |
| 11/15/2013*; 7:00 pm | at Army | W 89–85 | 1–2 | Christl Arena (1,066); West Point, NY |
| 11/17/2013*; 5:00 pm | at New Hampshire | W 71–63 | 2–2 | Lundholm Gym (634); Durham, NH |
| 11/19/2013*; 7:00 pm | at Maine | W 88–82 | 3–2 | Cross Insurance Center (1,772); Bangor, ME |
| 11/23/2013*; 2:00 pm | Lafayette | W 91–88 ^{OT} | 4–2 | Fleisher Center (712); Newark, NJ |
| 11/26/2013*; 7:00 pm | Central Connecticut | L 71–74 | 4–3 | Fleisher Center (N/A); Newark, NJ |
| 12/01/2013*; 2:00 pm | Albany | L 55–66 | 4–4 | Fleisher Center (600); Newark, NJ |
| 12/04/2013*; 7:00 pm | Maine | W 81–72 | 5–4 | Fleisher Center (688); Newark, NJ |
| 12/07/2013*; 2:00 pm | UMass Lowell | W 55–44 | 6–4 | Fleisher Center (517); Newark, NJ |
| 12/10/2013*; 9:00 pm | at Seton Hall | L 55–71 | 6–5 | Prudential Center (6,443); Newark, NJ |
| 12/12/2013*; 7:00 pm | LIU Brooklyn | L 93–96 | 6–6 | Fleisher Center (777); Newark, NJ |
| 12/21/2013*; 2:00 pm | Holy Cross | L 55–74 | 6–7 | Fleisher Center (850); Newark, NJ |
| 12/23/2013*; 2:00 pm | at St. Francis Brooklyn | L 65–77 | 6–8 | Generoso Pope Athletic Complex (305); Brooklyn, NY |
| 12/28/2013*; 1:00 pm | at Butler | L 48–66 | 6–9 | Hinkle Fieldhouse (6,504); Indianapolis, IN |
| 12/30/2013*; 7:00 pm | at Hofstra | L 64–75 | 6–10 | Mack Sports Complex (856); Hempstead, NY |
| 01/04/2014*; 2:00 pm | at Saint Francis (PA) | W 64–56 | 7–10 | DeGol Arena (726); Loretto, PA |
| 01/13/2014*; 7:00 pm | CCNY | W 99–60 | 8–10 | Fleisher Center (522); Newark, NJ |
| 01/16/2014*; 7:00 pm | at North Carolina Central | L 55–71 | 8–11 | McLendon–McDougald Gymnasium (2,114); Durham, NC |
| 01/18/2014*; 6:00 pm | at North Carolina A&T | L 82–88 | 8–12 | Corbett Sports Center (2,855); Greensboro, NC |
| 01/25/2014*; 7:30 pm | at Penn | L 74–89 | 8–13 | The Palestra (2,455); Philadelphia, PA |
| 01/27/2014*; 7:00 pm | at Delaware State | W 65–59 ^{OT} | 9–13 | Memorial Hall (1,007); Dover, DE |
| 01/29/2014*; 7:00 pm | Duquesne | L 64–71 | 9–14 | Fleisher Center (864); Newark, NJ |
| 02/03/2014*; 2:00 pm | at UMass Lowell | L 64–73 | 9–15 | Costello Athletic Center (241); Lowell, MA |
| 02/06/2014*; 7:00 pm | Wheelock | W 110–46 | 10–15 | Fleisher Center (600); Newark, NJ |
| 02/12/2014*; 7:00 pm | UMaine Fort Kent | W 84–45 | 11–15 | Fleisher Center (500); Newark, NJ |
| 02/19/2014*; 7:00 pm | at Maryland Eastern Shore | W 77–76 | 12–15 | Hytche Athletic Center (1,991); Princess Anne, MD |
| 02/22/2014*; 2:00 pm | Fisher (MA) | W 99–67 | 13–15 | Fleisher Center (1,012); Newark, NJ |
| 02/25/2014*; 7:00 pm | North Carolina Central | L 62–81 | 13–16 | Fleisher Center (1,115); Newark, NJ |
*Non-conference game. ^{#}Rankings from AP Poll. (#) Tournament seedings in parentheses. All times are in Eastern Time.
