= Rashad Whack =

American basketball player (born 1991)

Ferroviário de Maputo
- Position: Guard
- League: Basketball Africa League

Personal information
- Born: January 22, 1991 (age 35)
- Listed height: 6 ft 3 in (1.91 m)
- Listed weight: 200 lb (91 kg)

Career information
- High school: Bishop McNamara (Forestville, Maryland)
- College: George Mason (2009–2011); Mount St. Mary's (2012–2014)
- NBA draft: 2014: undrafted
- Playing career: 2014–present

Career history
- 2014–2016: Island Storm
- 2016–2017: Winterthur
- 2017: Island Storm
- 2017: Grindavík
- 2017–2019: Cape Breton Highlanders
- 2018–2019: USK Praha
- 2020–present: Ferroviário de Maputo

Career highlights
- LNBA scoring champion (2017); NBL Canada Rookie of the Year (2015); Second-team All-NEC (2014); NEC tournament MVP (2014)

Rashad Whack (born January 22, 1991) is an American professional basketball player for Ferroviário de Maputo.

== College career ==
Whack competed at the college level for George Mason and Mount Saint Mary's, and earned All-Northeast Conference honors as a senior with the latter team.

== Professional career ==
Whack was most notably named the league's Rookie of the Year for the 2014–15 season, while playing for the Island Storm. Following his good rookie season he signed to play for a second season for the Storm. In the summer of 2016, Whack signed for BC Winterthur of the LNBA. He led the league in scoring during the 2016–2017 season with an average of 21.4 points per game. He returned to the Storm in April and finished the season with them.

In September 2017, Whack signed for Grindavík of the Úrvalsdeild karla. Whack was released by Grindavík on December 12, after averaging a team leading 22.8 points in 10 games. He later signed with the Cape Breton Highlanders and averaged 8.0 points per game in the 2017–18 season.

In March 2020, Whack signed with Ferroviário de Maputo of the Basketball Africa League (BAL).

== Personal ==
Whack was born on January 22, 1991, to Theresa Lewis and Larry Whack and has a brother. His godfather is actor Martin Lawrence. Whack appeared in the film Rebound, in which Lawrence starred. Outside of basketball, he likes music and drawing. He majored in accounting while attending Mount St. Mary's University.
