= Karvel Anderson =

American basketball player

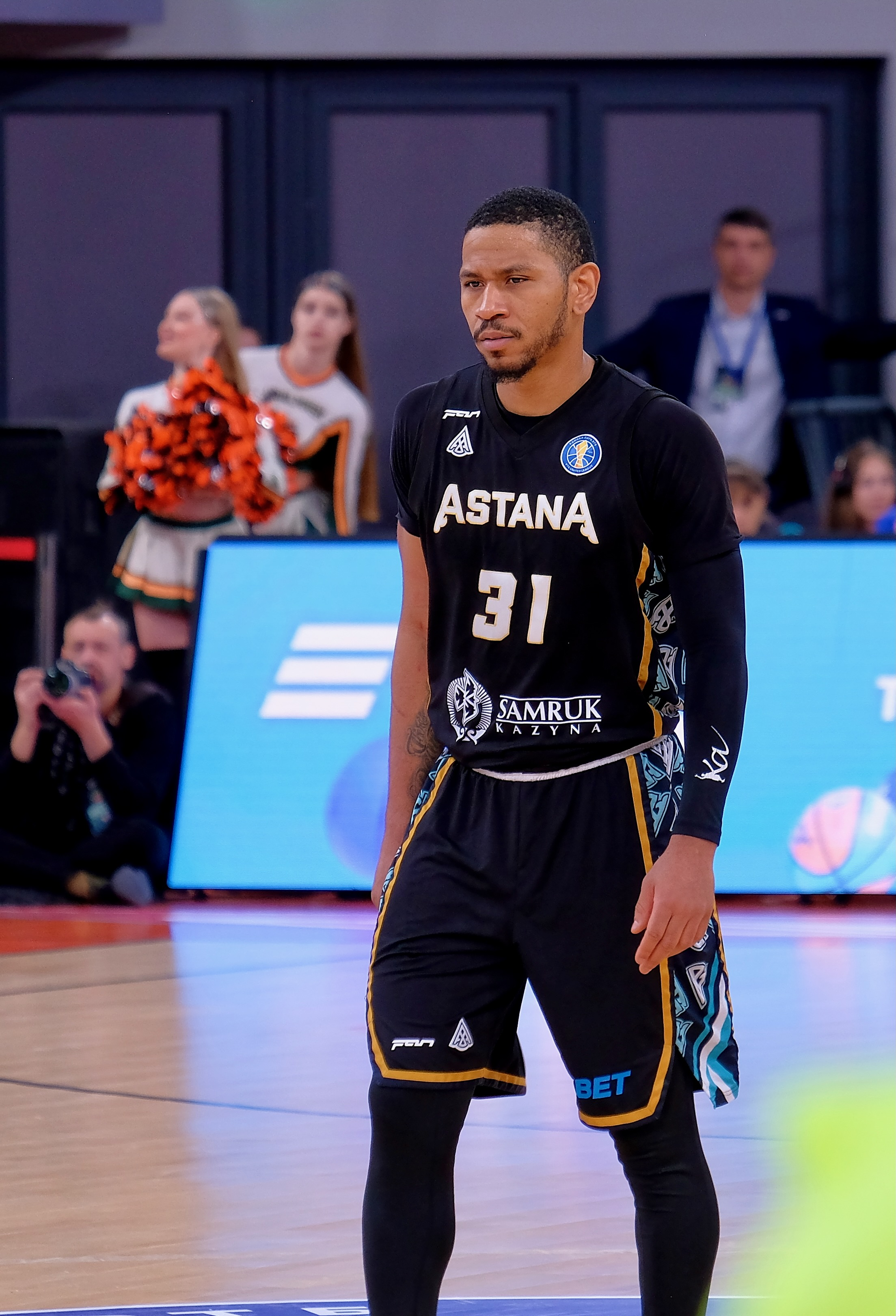
- Anderson with Astana in 2024

No. 3 – Saint-Quentin Basket-Ball
- Position: Shooting guard
- League: LNB Élite

Personal information
- Born: June 3, 1991 (age 35) Berrien Springs, Michigan, U.S.
- Listed height: 6 ft 2 in (1.88 m)
- Listed weight: 190 lb (86 kg)

Career information
- High school: Elkhart Memorial (Elkhart, Indiana)
- College: Butler CC (2009); Lake Michigan (2010); Glen Oaks CC (2010–2012); Robert Morris (2012–2014)
- NBA draft: 2014: undrafted
- Playing career: 2014–present

Career history
- 2014–2016: Andrea Costa Imola
- 2016–2017: Eisbären Bremerhaven
- 2017–2018: Boulazac Basket Dordogne
- 2018–2019: Gravelines-Dunkerque
- 2019–2020: Fuenlabrada
- 2020–2021: Büyükçekmece
- 2021–2023: Scaligera Verona
- 2023–2024: Astana
- 2024–2025: Lokomotiv Kuban
- 2025–2026: Pistoia Basket 2000
- 2026–present: Saint-Quentin

Career highlights
- NEC Player of the Year (2014); First-team All-NEC (2014)

Karvel Markeese Anderson (born June 3, 1991) is an American professional basketball player for Saint-Quentin of the French LNB Élite. He is from Elkhart, Indiana. After graduating from Elkhart Memorial High School, Anderson spent time at Butler Community College, Lake Michigan College, and Glen Oaks Community College. At Glen Oaks, he was recruited by Robert Morris coach Andy Toole, after Toole visited Anderson during a workout. Stepping up to the Division I level for the Robert Morris Colonials of the Northeast Conference, Anderson went on to average 20 points per game while shooting 48% from the field, and was named Northeast Conference Player of the Year in 2014.

== Professional career ==
Following the close of his college career in 2014, Anderson signed with Entersport, a top tier professional basketball agency. In August of that same year, Anderson signed with Andrea Costa Imola in Italy's second division.

On August 3, 2020, he has signed with Büyükçekmece Basketbol of the Turkish Basketbol Süper Ligi (BSL).

On July 27, 2021, he has signed with Scaligera Verona in the LBA. On July 13, 2022, he has re-signed with the team for one more season.

On August 1, 2026, he signed with Saint-Quentin Basket-Ball of the French LNB Élite.
