= Charles L. Sewall Center =

Sports arena in Pittsburgh, Pennsylvania

Coordinates: 40.520212°N 80.21476°W

Charles L. Sewall Center, commonly referred to as the Sewall Center, and nicknamed "The Chuck" was a 3,056-seat multi-purpose arena in the Pittsburgh suburb of Moon Township, Pennsylvania. It was home to the Robert Morris Colonials men's and women's basketball teams as well as the women's volleyball team from 1985 until 2017. The Northeast Conference men's basketball tournament was held there four times. The inaugural game was held on November 30, 1985, when Robert Morris lost to Duquesne 80-65. The building, named for the university's president from 1967 to 1989, replaced the John Jay Center in 1985.

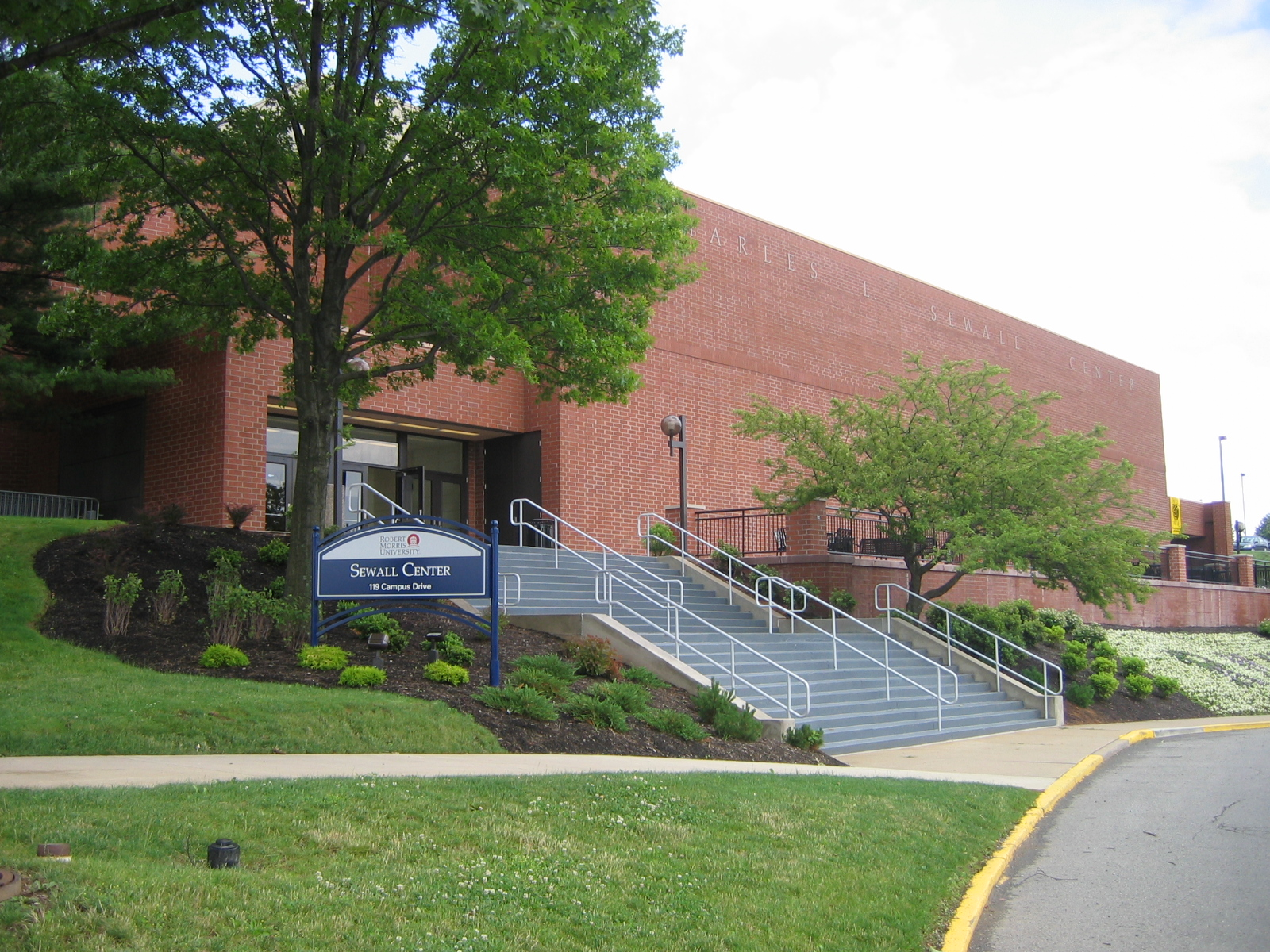
Exterior, Summer 2008

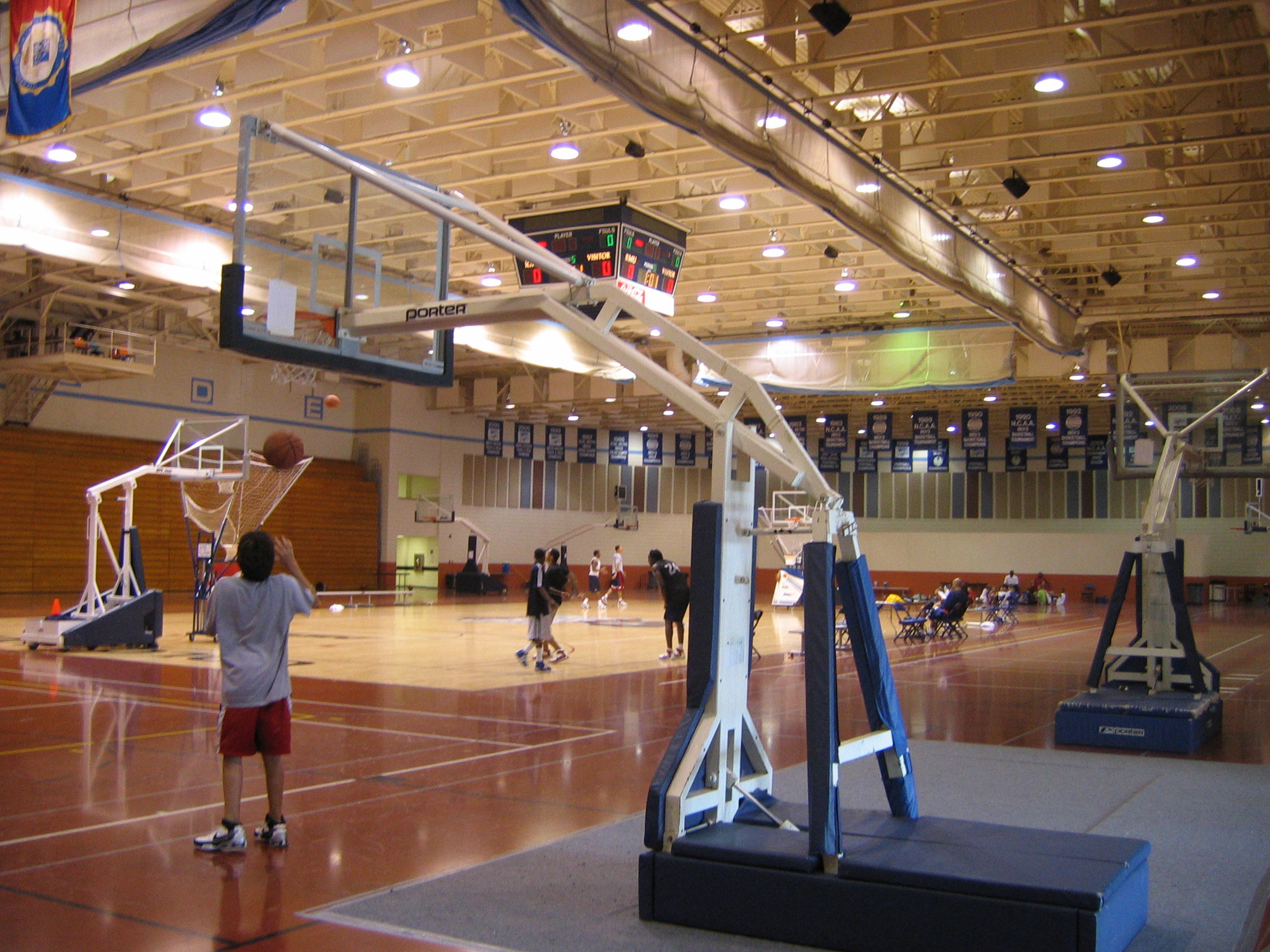
Interior, Summer 2008

Robert Morris University announced plans to either renovate and expand or build a brand new arena for Colonials basketball in 2010. On January 19, 2017, the University announced that the Sewall Center would be torn down to make way for its replacement, the UPMC Events Center, a 140,000 square foot building with a 4,000 seat arena. The Sewall Center held its last event, a volleyball tournament, on September 15–16, 2017, after which demolition started.

== See also ==
- List of NCAA Division I basketball arenas
