= James Johnson (basketball, born 1971) =

American basketball player and coach

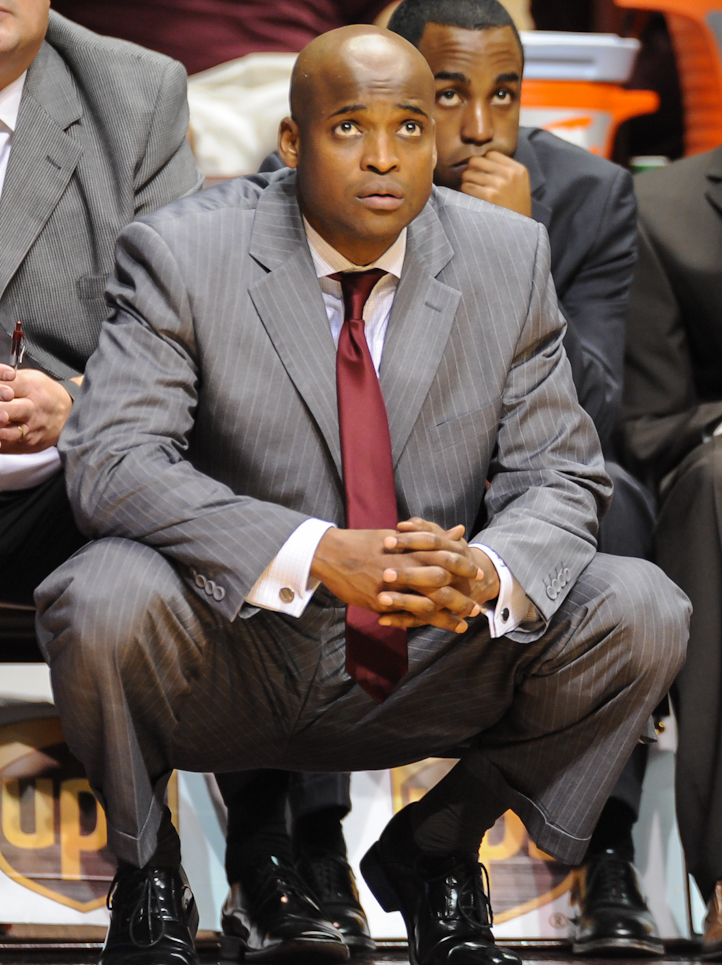
- Johnson in 2012

Current position
- Title: Director of High School Relations
- Team: Virginia Tech
- Conference: ACC

Biographical details
- Born: July 20, 1971 (age 55)

Playing career
- 1989–1993: Ferrum

Coaching career (HC unless noted)
- 1995–1996: Longwood (assistant)
- 1996–1997: Hargrave Mil. Acad. (assistant)
- 1997–2000: Old Dominion (assistant)
- 2000–2002: Elon (assistant)
- 2002–2003: College of Charleston (assistant)
- 2003–2005: Penn State (assistant)
- 2005–2007: George Mason (assistant)
- 2007–2012: Virginia Tech (assistant)
- 2012–2014: Virginia Tech
- 2015–2017: Miami (FL) (basketball ops)
- 2017–2022: NC State (assistant)
- 2023–present: Virginia Tech (Director of High School Relations)

Head coaching record
- Overall: 22–41

James Johnson (born July 20, 1971) is an American college basketball coach and former head coach of the Virginia Tech Hokies men's basketball team. He currently serves as a member of the Virginia Tech Hokies football staff as their Director of High School relations.

He was hired in 2012 to succeed Seth Greenberg, on whose staff Johnson had worked until leaving for Clemson, only to be hired back 12 days later. Johnson was fired by Virginia Tech on March 17, 2014, after two seasons with an overall record of 22–41.

James Johnson joined the University of Miami basketball program as the team’s Director of Basketball Operations in June 2015. Johnson, who was on Jim Larrañaga’s staff for two seasons at George Mason University, including the historic NCAA Final Four run in 2006, came to Miami after seven seasons on staff at fellow Atlantic Coast Conference school Virginia Tech, where he was the head coach for two seasons after five years as an assistant coach.

On Monday, March 27, Kevin Keatts announced that James Johnson had been hired as an assistant coach for the NC State Wolfpack men's basketball program. Johnson and Keatts were teammates for two seasons at Ferrum College in Ferrum, Virginia, from 1991–93. Johnson came to the Wolfpack after two years as the Director of Basketball Operations for Jim Larrañaga's program at Miami. He was relieved of his duties with the Wolfpack on May 9, 2022.

Johnson was hired by Virginia Tech on May 9, 2023 to serve as the Director of High School School Relations for the Hokies football team.

Johnson played collegiate basketball at Ferrum College, where he was a three-year starter and is a member of the Ferrum hall of fame.

== Head coaching record ==
Record table
Season	Team	Overall	Conference	Standing	Postseason
Virginia Tech Hokies (Atlantic Coast Conference) (2012–2014)
2012–13	Virginia Tech	13–19	4–14	12th	
2013–14	Virginia Tech	9–22	2–16	15th	
Virginia Tech:		22–41 (.349)	6–30 (.167)		
Total:		22–41 (.349)			
