= 2013–14 Clemson Tigers men's basketball team =

American college basketball season

2013–2014 Clemson Tigers men's basketball

NIT, Semifinals
- Conference: Atlantic Coast Conference
- Record: 23–13 (10–8 ACC)
- Head coach: Brad Brownell
- Assistant coaches: Mike Winiecki; Earl Grant; Steve Smith
- Home arena: Littlejohn Coliseum

2013–14 ACC men's basketball standings
	Conf.				Overall
Team	W		L	PCT	W		L	PCT
No. 3 Virginia †	16	–	2	.889	30	–	7	.811
No. 14 Syracuse	14	–	4	.778	28	–	6	.824
No. 8 Duke	13	–	5	.722	26	–	9	.743
No. 19 North Carolina	13	–	5	.722	24	–	10	.706
Pittsburgh	11	–	7	.611	26	–	10	.722
Clemson	10	–	8	.556	23	–	13	.639
NC State	9	–	9	.500	22	–	14	.611
Maryland	9	–	9	.500	17	–	15	.531
Florida State	9	–	9	.500	22	–	14	.611
Miami (FL)	7	–	11	.389	17	–	16	.515
Wake Forest	6	–	12	.333	17	–	16	.515
Georgia Tech	6	–	12	.333	16	–	17	.485
Notre Dame	6	–	12	.333	15	–	17	.469
Boston College	4	–	14	.222	8	–	24	.250
Virginia Tech	2	–	16	.111	9	–	22	.290
† 2014 ACC tournament winner Rankings from AP poll

The 2013–14 Clemson Tigers men's basketball team represented Clemson University during the 2013–14 NCAA Division I men's basketball season. Led by fourth year head coach Brad Brownell, the Tigers played their home games at Littlejohn Coliseum as members of the Atlantic Coast Conference. They finished the season 23–13, 10–8 in ACC play to finish in sixth place.

Clemson advanced to the quarterfinals of the ACC tournament where they lost to Duke. They received an invitation to the National Invitation Tournament where they defeated Georgia State, Illinois and Belmont to advance to the semifinals where they lost to SMU.

== Roster ==
2013–14 Clemson Tigers men's basketball team
Players
Coaches

Pos.	#	Name	Height	Weight	Year	Hometown
F	1	Austin Ajukwa	6 ft 5 in (1.96 m)	190 lb (86 kg)	Fr	Columbia, South Carolina
G	2	Carson Fields	6 ft 4 in (1.93 m)	200 lb (91 kg)	Jr	Pewee Valley, Kentucky
G	3	Adonis Filer	6 ft 2 in (1.88 m)	190 lb (86 kg)	So	Chicago, Illinois
G	4	Patrick Rooks	6 ft 2 in (1.88 m)	185 lb (84 kg)	Fr	Charlotte, North Carolina
F	5	Jaron Blossomgame	6 ft 7 in (2.01 m)	215 lb (98 kg)	RS Fr	Alpharetta, Georgia
G	12	Rod Hall	6 ft 1 in (1.85 m)	210 lb (95 kg)	Jr	Augusta, Georgia
G	15	Devin Coleman	6 ft 2 in (1.88 m)	205 lb (93 kg)	RS So	Philadelphia, Pennsylvania
G	20	Jordan Roper	5 ft 11 in (1.8 m)	165 lb (75 kg)	So	Columbia, South Carolina
G	21	Damarcus Harrison	6 ft 4 in (1.93 m)	205 lb (93 kg)	RS Jr	Greenwood, South Carolina
F	32	K. J. McDaniels	6 ft 6 in (1.98 m)	200 lb (91 kg)	Jr	Birmingham, Alabama
F	33	Josh Smith	6 ft 8 in (2.03 m)	260 lb (118 kg)	So	Charlotte, North Carolina
C	35	Landry Nnoko	6 ft 10 in (2.08 m)	250 lb (113 kg)	So	Yaoundé, Cameroon
F	42	Ibrahim Djambo	6 ft 10 in (2.08 m)	215 lb (98 kg)	Jr	Bamako, Mali
C	50	Sidy Djitte	6 ft 10 in (2.08 m)	240 lb (109 kg)	Fr	Dakar, Senegal

Head coach

- Brad Brownell

Assistant coach(es)

- Mike Winiecki
- Earl Grant
- Steve Smith

Legend

- (C) Team captain
- (S) Suspended
- (I) Ineligible
- (W) Walk-on
- Injured
- Current redshirt

Roster
Last update: September 28, 2013

=== Depth chart ===
Pos.	Starting 5	Bench 1	Bench 2
C	Landy Nnoko	Ibrahim Djambo
PF	Jaron Blossomgame	Josh Smith
SF	K.J. McDaniels	Austin Ajukwa
SG	Jordan Roper	Damarcus Harrison	Carson Fields
PG	Rod Hall	Adonis Filer	Patrick Rooks

== Schedule ==
Date time, TV	Rank^{#}	Opponent^{#}	Result	Record	High points	High rebounds	High assists	Site (attendance) city, state
Non-conference regular season
Nov 8*; 7:00 pm, ESPN3		Stetson	W 71–51	1–0	20 – McDaniels	7 – Tied	4 – Roper	Littlejohn Coliseum (5,200); Clemson, SC
Nov 13*; 7:00 pm, ESPN3		Delaware State	W 58–37	2–0	15 – Harrison	8 – Blossomgame	4 – Hall	Littlejohn Coliseum (5,000); Clemson, SC
Nov 17*; 7:00 pm, ESPN3		South Carolina	W 71–57	3–0	21 – McDaniels	10 – McDaniel	4 – Tied	Littlejohn Coliseum (7,283); Clemson, SC
Nov 21*; 8:00 pm, ESPN3		vs. Temple; Charleston Classic	W 72–58	4–0	20 – McDaniels	15 – Nnoko	5 – Hall	TD Arena (2,311); Charleston, SC
Nov 22*; 9:30 pm, ESPNU		vs. Davidson; Charleston Classic	W 85–54	5–0	22 – McDaniels	9 – Blossomgame	3 – Tied	TD Arena (2,520); Charleston, SC
Nov 24*; 9:00 pm, ESPN2		vs. UMass; Charleston Classic Championship	L 56–62	5–1	16 – Hall	6 – McDaniels	4 – Hall	TD Arena (2,117); Charleston, SC
Nov 29*; 7:00 pm, ESPN3		Coastal Carolina	W 69–40	6–1	22 – McDaniels	9 – Nnoko	5 – Hall	Littlejohn Coliseum (6,735); Clemson, SC
Dec 3*; 7:00 pm, ESPN3		South Carolina State	W 65–49	7–1	16 – Coleman	13 – Nnoko	4 – Tied	Littlejohn Coliseum (4,256); Clemson, SC
Dec 7*; 2:00 pm, CSS		at Arkansas	L 68–74	7–2	27 – McDaniels	11 – McDaniels	4 – Hall	Bud Walton Arena (13,967); Fayetteville, AR
Dec 14*; 7:00 pm, ESPN3		Furman	W 71–35	8–2	16 – Roper	11 – Nnoko	4 – Hall	Littlejohn Coliseum (6,485); Clemson, SC
Dec 19*; 8:00 pm, FSN		at Auburn	L 64–66	8–3	18 – McDaniels	8 – Nnoko	4 – Hall	Auburn Arena (4,938); Auburn, AL
Dec 30*; 7:00 pm, ESPN3		VMI	W 80–50	9–3	19 – Roper	8 – Roper	6 – Filer	Littlejohn Coliseum (7,540); Clemson, SC
ACC regular season
Jan 4; 4:00 pm, RSN		at Boston College	W 62–60	10–3 (1–0)	16 – McDaniels	9 – McDaniels	7 – Hall	Conte Forum (5,268); Chestnut Hill, MA
Jan 9; 7:00 pm, RSN		Florida State	L 41–56	10–4 (1–1)	14 – McDaniels	7 – McDaniels	3 – Filer	Littlejohn Coliseum (8,319); Clemson, SC
Jan 11; 2:00 pm, RSN		No. 16 Duke	W 72–59	11–4 (2–1)	24 – McDaniels	14 – Blossomgame	4 – Hall	Littlejohn Coliseum (9,842); Clemson, SC
Jan 15; 7:00 pm, RSN		at Virginia Tech	W 56–49	12–4 (3–1)	14 – McDaniels	7 – Blossongame	1 – Tied	Cassell Coliseum (4,022); Blacksburg, VA
Jan 18; 4:00 pm, ACCN		Wake Forest	W 61–53	13–4 (4–1)	15 – McDaniels	12 – McDaniels	3 – Hall	Littlejohn Coliseum (9,842); Clemson, SC
Jan 21; 8:00 pm, ACCN		at No. 20 Pittsburgh	L 43–76	13–5 (4–2)	11 – McDaniels	7 – Djitte	3 – Tied	Petersen Events Center (12,508); Pittsburgh, PA
Jan 26; 6:00 pm, ESPNU		at North Carolina	L 61–80	13–6 (4–3)	13 – McDaniels	9 – McDaniels	2 – Tied	Dean E. Smith Center (18,616); Chapel Hill, NC
Feb 1; 4:00 pm, ESPN2		at Florida State	W 53–49	14–6 (5–3)	26 – McDaniels	7 – McDaniels	6 – Hall	Donald L. Tucker Center (9,752); Tallahassee, FL
Feb 4; 8:00 pm, ACCN		Georgia Tech	W 45–41	15–6 (6–3)	12 – Roper	9 – Blossomgame	6 – Hall	Littlejohn Coliseum (7,248); Clemson, SC
Feb 9; 6:00 pm, ESPNU		at No. 1 Syracuse	L 44–57	15–7 (6–4)	19 – McDaniels	10 – McDaniels	4 – Hall	Carrier Dome (25,931); Syracuse, NY
Feb 11; 7:00 pm, RSN		at Notre Dame	L 64–68 ^{2OT}	15–8 (6–5)	30 – McDaniels	14 – McDaniels	3 – McDaniels	Purcell Pavilion (8,119); South Bend, IN
Feb 15; 12:00 pm, ESPN2		No. 17 Virginia	L 58–63	15–9 (6–6)	23 – McDaniels	4 – McDaniels	5 – Hall	Littlejohn Coliseum (8,573); Clemson, SC
Feb 18; 7:00 pm, ESPNU		NC State	W 73–56	16–9 (7–6)	20 – Hall	6 – Blossomgame	2 – 4 Tied	Littlejohn Coliseum (6,987); Clemson, SC
Feb 22; 12:00 pm, RSN		at Georgia Tech	W 63–55	17–9 (8–6)	16 – McDaniels	6 – Nnoko	6 – Hall	McCamish Pavilion (8,003); Atlanta, GA
Feb 25; 7:00 pm, RSN		at Wake Forest	L 57–62	17–10 (8–7)	15 – Harrison	6 – Nnoko	4 – Hall	LJVM Coliseum (8,527); Winston-Salem, NC
Mar 2; 7:00 pm, ACCN		Maryland	W 77–73 ^{2OT}	18–10 (9–7)	26 – McDaniels	14 – McDaniels	2 – Hall	Littlejohn Coliseum (7,991); Clemson, SC
Mar 4; 8:00 pm, ACCN		Miami	W 58–54	19–10 (10–7)	14 – Hall	9 – McDaniels	6 – Hall	Littlejohn Coliseum (7,071); Clemson, SC
Mar 8; 4:00 pm, ACCN		Pittsburgh	L 78–83 ^{OT}	19–11 (10–8)	24 – McDaniels	6 – Blossomgame	6 – Hall	Littlejohn Coliseum (10,000); Clemson, SC
ACC tournament
Mar 13; 9:00 pm, ESPNU/ACC Network		vs. Georgia Tech; Second round	W 69–65 ^{OT}	20–11	18 – McDaniels	9 – Blossomgame	2 – Hall	Greensboro Coliseum (21,533); Greensboro, NC
Mar 14; 9:00 pm, ESPN/ACC Network		vs. No. 7 Duke; Quarterfinals	L 62–63	20–12	13 – Hall	8 – Nnoko,	3 – Tied	Greensboro Coliseum (21,533); Greensboro, NC
NIT
Mar 18*; 9:00 pm, ESPNU	No. (3)	(6) Georgia State; First round	W 78–66	21–12	30 – McDaniels	14 – McDaniels	6 – Hall	Littlejohn Coliseum (3,859); Clemson, SC
Mar 23*; 11:00 am, ESPN	No. (3)	(2) Illinois; Second round	W 50–49	22–12	11 – Nnoko	8 – Nnoko	5 – Harrison	Littlejohn Coliseum (10,000); Clemson, SC
Mar 25*; 7:00 pm, ESPN	No. (3)	(5) Belmont; Quarterfinals	W 73–68	23–12	16 – Harrison, McDaniels	9 – Nnoko	4 – Hall	Littlejohn Coliseum (10,000); Clemson, SC
Apr 1*; 7:00 pm, ESPN2	No. (3)	vs. (1) SMU; Semifinals	L 59–65	23–13	18 – Hall	7 – McDaniels	5 – Hall	Madison Square Garden (7,193); New York, NY
*Non-conference game. ^{#}Rankings from AP Poll, (#) during NIT is seed within region. (#) Tournament seedings in parentheses. All times are in Eastern Time.
