= 2013–14 Boston College Eagles men's basketball team =

American college basketball season

2013–14 Boston College Eagles men's basketball
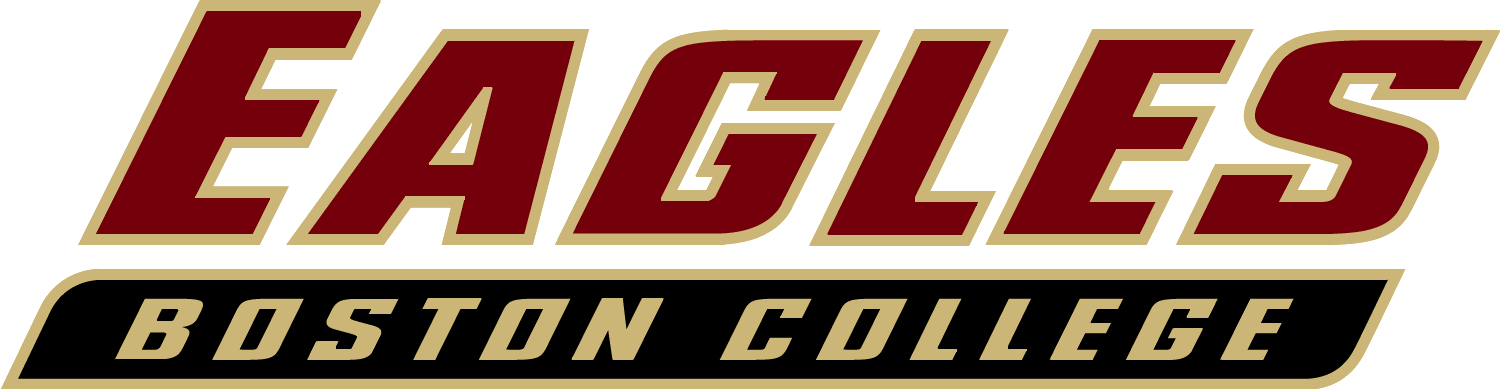
- Conference: Atlantic Coast Conference
- Record: 8–24 (4–14 ACC)
- Head coach: Steve Donahue
- Assistant coaches: Nat Graham; Woody Kampmann; Akbar Waheed
- Home arena: Conte Forum

2013–14 ACC men's basketball standings
| | Conf. | | | | Overall |
| Team | W | | L | PCT | W | | L | PCT |
|---|---|---|---|---|---|---|---|---|
| No. 3 Virginia † | 16 | – | 2 | .889 | 30 | – | 7 | .811 |
| No. 14 Syracuse | 14 | – | 4 | .778 | 28 | – | 6 | .824 |
| No. 8 Duke | 13 | – | 5 | .722 | 26 | – | 9 | .743 |
| No. 19 North Carolina | 13 | – | 5 | .722 | 24 | – | 10 | .706 |
| Pittsburgh | 11 | – | 7 | .611 | 26 | – | 10 | .722 |
| Clemson | 10 | – | 8 | .556 | 23 | – | 13 | .639 |
| NC State | 9 | – | 9 | .500 | 22 | – | 14 | .611 |
| Maryland | 9 | – | 9 | .500 | 17 | – | 15 | .531 |
| Florida State | 9 | – | 9 | .500 | 22 | – | 14 | .611 |
| Miami (FL) | 7 | – | 11 | .389 | 17 | – | 16 | .515 |
| Wake Forest | 6 | – | 12 | .333 | 17 | – | 16 | .515 |
| Georgia Tech | 6 | – | 12 | .333 | 16 | – | 17 | .485 |
| Notre Dame | 6 | – | 12 | .333 | 15 | – | 17 | .469 |
| Boston College | 4 | – | 14 | .222 | 8 | – | 24 | .250 |
| Virginia Tech | 2 | – | 16 | .111 | 9 | – | 22 | .290 |
† 2014 ACC tournament winner Rankings from AP poll

The 2013–14 Boston College Eagles men's basketball team represented Boston College during the 2013–14 NCAA Division I men's basketball season. The Eagles, led by fourth year head coach Steve Donahue, played their games at Conte Forum and were members of the Atlantic Coast Conference. On February 19, the Eagles achieved what is considered the biggest win of Donahue's tenure at BC by beating #1-ranked and previously undefeated Syracuse on the road in the Carrier Dome, 62-59 in overtime. Although this was a conference game, the result could easily be considered the most-shocking upset of the 2013-2014 college basketball season. Unfortunately, it proved to be the lone bright spot for the Eagles as they finished the season 8–24, 4–14 in ACC play to finish in 14th place. They lost in the first round of the ACC tournament to Georgia Tech. On March 18, 2014, Donahue was fired from his position as head coach. On April 3, Donahue was replaced by Jim Christian, most recently the head coach at Ohio.

== Departures ==
| Name | Number | Pos. | Height | Weight | Year | Hometown | Notes |
|---|---|---|---|---|---|---|---|
| Salah Abdo | 0 | G | 6'2" | 188 | Senior | Chelsea, MA | Graduated |
| Gabe Moton | 1 | G | 6'1" | 177 | Sophomore | Saint Petersburg, FL | Transferred |
| Deirunas Visockas | 2 | G | 6'4" | 192 | Senior | Kaunas, Lithuania | Graduated |
| Jordan Daniels | 10 | G | 5'8" | 153 | Freshman | California | Transferred |
| Ryan Kilcullen | 11 | F | 6'7" | 214 | Freshman | Hingham, MA | Transferred |
| Matt Humphrey | 15 | G | 6'5" | 185 | RS Junior | Chicago, IL | Transferred |
| Peter Rehnquist | 25 | G/F | 6'4" | 210 | Senior | Sharon, MA | Graduated |
| Dallas Elmore | 30 | G | 6'5" | 210 | Junior | Fort Collins, CO | Left school |

== Recruiting ==
College recruiting information
| Name | Hometown | School | Height | Weight | Commit date |
|---|---|---|---|---|---|
| Darryl Hicks; SG | Shelbyville, Kentucky | Trinity High School | 6 ft 2 in (1.88 m) | 190 lb (86 kg) | Mar 26, 2013 |
| Darryl Hicks; SG | Recruit ratings: Scout: Rivals: (73) | | | | |
| Garland Owens; SF | Gaithersburg, Maryland | Massanutten Military Academy (POST) | 6 ft 5 in (1.96 m) | 206 lb (93 kg) | Oct 21, 2012 |
| Garland Owens; SF | Recruit ratings: Scout: Rivals: (69) | | | | |
Overall recruit ranking:
Note: In many cases, Scout, Rivals, 247Sports, On3, and ESPN may conflict in their listings of height and weight.; In these cases, the average was taken. ESPN grades are on a 100-point scale.; Sources: "2013 Team Ranking". Rivals.

== Roster ==
2013–14 Boston College Eagles men's basketball team
Players
Coaches

| Pos. | # | Name | Height | Weight | Year | Hometown |
|---|---|---|---|---|---|---|
| F | 0 | Garland Owens | 6 ft 5 in (1.96 m) | 203 lb (92 kg) | Fr | Gaithersburg, MD |
| G | 1 | Steve Perpiglia | 5 ft 10 in (1.78 m) | 168 lb (76 kg) | So | Broomall, PA |
| F | 4 | Eddie Odio | 6 ft 8 in (2.03 m) | 209 lb (95 kg) | Jr | Miami, FL |
| C | 5 | K. C. Caudill | 6 ft 11 in (2.11 m) | 269 lb (122 kg) | Jr | Brea, CA |
| G | 10 | Darryl Hicks (injured) | 6 ft 2 in (1.88 m) | 186 lb (84 kg) | Fr | Louisville, KY |
| F | 11 | Will Magarity | 6 ft 11 in (2.11 m) | 225 lb (102 kg) | Fr | Stockholm, Sweden |
| F | 12 | Ryan Anderson | 6 ft 9 in (2.06 m) | 216 lb (98 kg) | Jr | Lakewood, CA |
| F | 13 | John Cain Carney | 6 ft 9 in (2.06 m) | 223 lb (101 kg) | Jr | Philadelphia, PA |
| G | 14 | Drew Jacobs | 6 ft 2 in (1.88 m) | 191 lb (87 kg) | So | Mendham, NJ |
| G | 15 | Sam Donahue | 6 ft 1 in (1.85 m) | 178 lb (81 kg) | Fr | Pawcatuck, CT |
| G | 20 | Lonnie Jackson | 6 ft 4 in (1.93 m) | 182 lb (83 kg) | Jr | Valencia, CA |
| G | 21 | Olivier Hanlan | 6 ft 4 in (1.93 m) | 184 lb (83 kg) | So | Aylmer, QE |
| G | 23 | Alex Dragicevich | 6 ft 8 in (2.03 m) | 211 lb (96 kg) | Jr | Northbrook, IL |
| C | 24 | Dennis Clifford (injured) | 7 ft 1 in (2.16 m) | 250 lb (113 kg) | Jr | Bridgewater, MA |
| G | 25 | Joe Rahon | 6 ft 2 in (1.88 m) | 195 lb (88 kg) | So | San Diego, CA |
| G | 31 | Danny Rubin | 6 ft 6 in (1.98 m) | 198 lb (90 kg) | Sr | Chevy Chase, MD |
| G | 33 | Patrick Heckmann | 6 ft 6 in (1.98 m) | 208 lb (94 kg) | Jr | Mainz, Germany |

Head coach

- Steve Donahue (Ursinus)

Assistant coach(es)

- Nat Graham (Penn)
- Izzi Metz (Hobart)
- Akbar Waheed (Niagara)

Legend

- (C) Team captain
- (S) Suspended
- (I) Ineligible
- (W) Walk-on
- Injured
- Current redshirt

Roster
Last update: 2014–01–21

== Schedule and results ==
| Date time, TV | Opponent | Result | Record | Site (attendance) city, state |
Regular season
| 11/08/2013*; 6:00 pm, FS1 | at Providence | L 78–82 ^{OT} | 0–1 | Dunkin Donuts Center (11,102); Providence, RI |
| 11/10/2013*; 3:00 pm, NESN | vs. Massachusetts; Coaches vs. Cancer Boston Tip-Off | L 73–86 | 0–2 | TD Garden (6,037); Boston, MA |
| 11/14/2013*; 7:00 pm, ESPN3 | Toledo; 2K Sports Classic Regional | L 92–95 | 0–3 | Conte Forum (3,538); Chestnut Hill, MA |
| 11/17/2013*; 8:00 pm, ESPNU | Florida Atlantic; 2K Sports Classic Regional | W 82–79 | 1–3 | Conte Forum (1,653); Chestnut Hill, MA |
| 11/21/2013*; 7:00 pm, ESPN2 | vs. No. 18 UConn; 2K Sports Classic Semifinals | L 70–72 | 1–4 | Madison Square Garden (N/A); New York City, NY |
| 11/22/2013*; 5:00 pm, ESPNU | vs. Washington; 2K Sports Classic Consolation game | W 89–78 | 2–4 | Madison Square Garden (N/A); New York City, NY |
| 11/26/2013*; 7:00 pm, ESPN3 | Sacred Heart | W 75–67 ^{OT} | 3–4 | Conte Forum (2,149); Chestnut Hill, MA |
| 12/04/2013*; 9:00 pm, ESPN2 | at Purdue; ACC-Big Ten Challenge | L 67–88 | 3–5 | Mackey Arena (12,926); West Lafayette, IN |
| 12/08/2013*; 7:00 pm, P12N | at USC | L 62–78 | 3–6 | Galen Center (3,853); Los Angeles, CA |
| 12/12/2013; 7:00 pm, ESPNU | Maryland | L 80–88 | 3–7 (0–1) | Conte Forum (3,516); Chestnut Hill, MA |
| 12/15/2013*; 12:00 pm, ESPN3 | Philadelphia | W 67–50 | 4–7 | Conte Forum (1,265); Chestnut Hill, MA |
| 12/22/2013*; 2:00 pm, CSS | at Auburn | L 67–77 | 4–8 | Auburn Arena (4,622); Auburn, AL |
| 12/28/2013*; 7:30 pm, FS2 | vs. VCU; Brooklyn Winter Hoops Festival | L 50–69 | 4–9 | Barclays Center (N/A); Brooklyn, NY |
| 01/01/2014*; 4:00 pm | at Harvard; Rivalry | L 58–73 | 4–10 | Lavietes Pavilion (2,195); Cambridge, MA |
| 01/04/2014; 4:00 pm, RSN/ESPN3 | Clemson | L 60–62 | 4–11 (0–2) | Conte Forum (5,268); Chestnut Hill, MA |
| 01/11/2014; 12:00 pm, RSN/ESPN3 | at Virginia Tech | W 62–59 | 5–11 (1–2) | Cassell Coliseum (3,972); Blacksburg, VA |
| 01/13/2014; 9:00 pm, ESPNU | No. 2 Syracuse | L 59–69 | 5–12 (1–3) | Conte Forum (8,606); Chestnut Hill, MA |
| 01/18/2014; 12:00 pm, ESPN | at North Carolina | L 71–82 | 5–13 (1–4) | Dean Smith Center (18,115); Chapel, Hill, NC |
| 01/21/2014; 9:00 pm, ESPNU | Georgia Tech | L 60–68 | 5–14 (1–5) | Conte Forum (1,789); Chestnut Hill, MA |
| 01/29/2014; 7:00 pm, RSN/ESPN3 | Virginia Tech | W 76–52 | 6–14 (2–5) | Conte Forum (2,964); Chestnut Hill, MA |
| 02/01/2014; 12:00 pm, ACCN/ESPN3 | at Notre Dame | L 73–76 ^{OT} | 6–15 (2–6) | Edmund P. Joyce Center (8,955); South Bend, IN |
| 02/05/2014; 7:00 pm, ESPN2 | at No. 20 Virginia | L 67–77 | 6–16 (2–7) | John Paul Jones Arena (10,853); Charlottesville, VA |
| 02/08/2014; 6:00 pm, ESPN | No. 11 Duke | L 68–89 | 6–17 (2–8) | Conte Forum (8,606); Chestnut Hill, MA |
| 02/13/2014; 5:00 pm, RSN/ESPN3 | at Georgia Tech | L 71–74 | 6–18 (2–9) | McCamish Pavilion (3,104); Atlanta, GA |
| 02/16/2014; 6:00 pm, ESPNU | Notre Dame | L 69–73 | 6–19 (2–10) | Conte Forum (7,138); Chestnut Hill, MA |
| 02/19/2014; 7:00 pm, ESPN2 | at No. 1 Syracuse | W 62–59 ^{OT} | 7–19 (3–10) | Carrier Dome (26,716); Syracuse, NY |
| 02/22/2014; 12:00 pm, ACCN/ESPN3 | at Miami (FL) | L 42–69 | 7–20 (3–11) | BankUnited Center (5,517); Coral Gables, FL |
| 02/26/2014; 8:00 pm, ACCN/ESPN3 | Pittsburgh | L 59-66 | 7–21 (3–12) | Conte Forum (3,329); Chestnut Hill, MA |
| 03/01/2014; 4:00 pm, RSN/ESPN3 | at Wake Forest | W 80-72 | 8–21 (4–12) | LJVM Coliseum (10,705); Winston-Salem, NC |
| 03/04/2014; 9:00 pm, ESPNU | Florida State | L 70-74 | 8–22 (4–13) | Conte Forum (2,273); Chestnut Hill, MA |
| 03/09/2014; 6:00 pm, ESPNU | at North Carolina State | L 68-78 | 8–23 (4–14) | PNC Arena (14,316); Raleigh, NC |
ACC tournament
| 03/12/2014*; 7:00 pm, ESPNU/ACC Network | vs. Georgia Tech; First round | L 70–73 ^{OT} | 8–24 (4–14) | Greensboro Coliseum (10,945); Greensboro, NC |
*Non-conference game. ^{#}Rankings from AP Poll. (#) Tournament seedings in parentheses. All times are in Eastern Time.

== See also ==
2013–14 Boston College Eagles women's basketball team
