= 2013–14 Atlantic Coast Conference men's basketball season =

- League: NCAA Division I
- Sport: Basketball
- Teams: 15
- TV partner(s): ACCN, ESPN, Raycom Sports, Learfield Sports, CBS

Regular season
- First place: Virginia
- Season MVP: T. J. Warren, NC State

ACC tournament
- Champions: Virginia
- Runners-up: Duke
- Finals MVP: Joe Harris, Virginia

Atlantic Coast Conference men's basketball seasons
- ← 2012–13 2014–15 →

2013–14 ACC men's basketball standings
	Conf.				Overall
Team	W		L	PCT	W		L	PCT
No. 3 Virginia †	16	–	2	.889	30	–	7	.811
No. 14 Syracuse	14	–	4	.778	28	–	6	.824
No. 8 Duke	13	–	5	.722	26	–	9	.743
No. 19 North Carolina	13	–	5	.722	24	–	10	.706
Pittsburgh	11	–	7	.611	26	–	10	.722
Clemson	10	–	8	.556	23	–	13	.639
NC State	9	–	9	.500	22	–	14	.611
Maryland	9	–	9	.500	17	–	15	.531
Florida State	9	–	9	.500	22	–	14	.611
Miami (FL)	7	–	11	.389	17	–	16	.515
Wake Forest	6	–	12	.333	17	–	16	.515
Georgia Tech	6	–	12	.333	16	–	17	.485
Notre Dame	6	–	12	.333	15	–	17	.469
Boston College	4	–	14	.222	8	–	24	.250
Virginia Tech	2	–	16	.111	9	–	22	.290
† 2014 ACC tournament winner Rankings from AP poll

The 2013–14 ACC men's basketball season began with practices in October 2013, followed by the start of the 2013–14 NCAA Division I men's basketball season in November. Conference play started in early January 2014 and concluded in March with the 2014 ACC men's basketball tournament at the Greensboro Coliseum in Greensboro. The 2013–14 season marked the first season for three new additions to the conference from the Big East: Notre Dame, Pittsburgh, and Syracuse. It was also the final ACC season for conference charter member Maryland, which left after the season for the Big Ten Conference.

== Pre-season ==
	Media
1.	Duke (50)
2.	Syracuse (3)
3.	North Carolina (1)
4.	Virginia
5.	Notre Dame
6.	Pittsburgh
7.	Maryland
8.	Boston College
9.	Florida State
10.	NC State
11.	Georgia Tech
12.	Miami
13.	Wake Forest
14.	Clemson
15.	Virginia Tech

() first place votes

=== Pre-season All-ACC teams ===
Media
**C. J. Fair, SYRACUSE**
Joe Harris, VIRGINIA
Rodney Hood, DUKE
Jerian Grant, NOTRE DAME
Jabari Parker, DUKE

- Coaches select 8 players
- Players in bold are choices for ACC Player of the Year

== Rankings ==
Legend
Increase in ranking
Decrease in ranking
Not ranked previous week

		Pre	Wk 2	Wk 3	Wk 4	Wk 5	Wk 6	Wk 7	Wk 8	Wk 9	Wk 10	Wk 11	Wk 12	Wk 13	Wk 14	Wk 15	Wk 16	Wk 17	Wk 18	Wk 19	Post
Boston College	AP	RV																			
Boston College	C																				
Clemson	AP																				
Clemson	C																				
Duke	AP	4	4	6	6	10	8	8	9	7	16	23	18	17	11	8	5	6	4	7	8
Duke	C	4	4	6	5	8	7	8	9	8	13	20	18	16	11	9	6	7	4	6	6
Florida State	AP			RV	RV	RV			RV	RV											
Florida State	C				RV	RV			RV	RV											
Georgia Tech	AP																				
Georgia Tech	C																				
Maryland	AP																				
Maryland	C																				
Miami	AP																				
Miami	C																				
North Carolina	AP	12	12	24	16	RV	18	14	19	RV	RV					RV	RV	19	14	15	19
North Carolina	C	11	11	19	16	RV	21	18	19	RV	RV						RV	21	14	15	18
NC State	AP																				
NC State	C																				
Notre Dame	AP	21	21	RV							RV										
Notre Dame	C	22	22	RV	RV	RV															
Pittsburgh	AP	RV	RV	RV	RV	RV	RV	RV	RV	RV	RV	22	20	18	25	25	RV		RV		
Pittsburgh	C	RV	RV	RV	RV	RV	RV	RV	RV	RV	RV	21	19	17	22	23	RV	RV	RV	RV	RV
Syracuse	AP	8	9	9	8	4	2	2	2	2	2	2	2	2	1	1	1	4	7	11	14
Syracuse	C	7	7	7	7	5	3	2	2	2	2	2	2	2	1	1	1	5	7	11	12
Virginia	AP	24	25	RV	RV	RV	RV					RV	RV	RV	20	17	14	12	5	6	3
Virginia	C	25	25	RV	RV	RV	RV	RV					RV	RV	21	16	13	11	5	8	4
Virginia Tech	AP																				
Virginia Tech	C																				
Wake Forest	AP																				
Wake Forest	C																				

== Conference schedules ==
=== Conference matrix ===
This table summarizes the head-to-head results between teams in conference play during the regular season. Records in parentheses are head-to-head results between teams in conference play during the regular season and in the post-season conference tournament.

	Boston College	Clemson	Duke	Florida State	Georgia Tech	Maryland	Miami	North Carolina	NC State	Notre Dame	Pittsburgh	Syracuse	Virginia	Virginia Tech	Wake Forest
vs. Boston College	–	1–0	1–0	1–0	2–0 (3-0)	1–0	1–0	1–0	1–0	2–0	1–0	1–1	1–0	0–2	0–1
vs. Clemson	0–1	–	0–1 (1-1)	1–1	0–2 (0-3)	0–1	0–1	1–0	0–1	1–0	2–0	1–0	1–0	0–1	1–1
vs. Duke	0–1	1–0 (1-1)	–	0–1	0–2	0–1	0–1	1–1	0–1 (0-2)	1–0	0–1	1–1	0–1 (1-1)	0–1	1–1
vs. Florida State	0–1	1–1	1–0	–	0–1	1–1 (1-2)	1–1	1–0	1–0	0–1	0–1	1–0	2–0 (3-0)	0–1	0–1
vs. Georgia Tech	0–2 (0-3)	2–0 (3-0)	2–0	1–0	–	1–0	1–0	1–0	1–0	1–1	1–0	0–1	1–0	0–1	0–1
vs. Maryland	0–1	1–0	1–0	1–1 (2-1)	0–1	–	0–1	1–0	1–0	0–1	2–0	1–0	1–1	0–2	0–1
vs. Miami	0–1	1–0	1–0	1–1	0–1	1–0	–	0–1	1–1 (2-1)	0–1	1–0	2–0	1–0	2–0 (2-1)	0–1
vs. North Carolina	0–1	0–1	1–1	0–1	0–1	0–1	1–0	–	0–2	0–2	0–1 (1-1)	1–0	1–0	0–1	1–1
vs. N.C. State	0–1	1–0	1–0 (2-0)	0–1	0–1	0–1	1–1 (1-2)	2–0	–	0–1	1–1	1–0 (1-1)	1–0	0–1	1–1
vs. Notre Dame	0–2	0–1	0–1	1–0	1–1	1–0	1–0	2–0	1–0	–	1–0	1–0	2–0	0–1	1–0 (2-0)
vs. Pittsburgh	0–1	0–2	1–0	1–0	0–1	0–2	0–1	1–0 (1-1)	1–1	0–1	–	2–0	1–0 (2-0)	0–1	0–1 (0-2)
vs. Syracuse	1–1	0–1	1–1	0–1	1–0	0–1	0–2	0–1	0–1 (1-1)	0–1	0–2	–	1–0	0–1	0–1
vs. Virginia	0–1	0–1	1–0 (1-1)	0–2 (0-3)	0–1	1–1	0–1	0–1	0–1	0–2	0–1 (0-2)	0–1	–	0–2	0–1
vs. Virginia Tech	2–0	1–0	1–0	1–0	1–0	2–0	0–2 (1-2)	1–0	1–0	1–0	1–0	1–0	2–0	–	1–0
vs. Wake Forest	1–0	1–1	1–1	1–0	1–0	1–0	1–0	1–1	1–1	0–1 (0-2)	1–0 (2-0)	1–0	1–0	0–1	–
Total	4–14 (4-15)	10–8 (11-9)	13–5 (15-6)	9–9 (10-10)	6–12 (7-13)	9–9 (9-10)	7–11 (8-12)	13–5 (13-6)	9–9 (11-10)	6–12 (6-13)	11–7 (13-8)	14–4 (14-5)	16–2 (19-2)	2–16 (2-17)	6–12 (7-13)

=== Boston College ===
Date time, TV	Rank^{#}	Opponent^{#}	Result	Record	Site city, state
ACC regular season
December 12, 2013; 7:00 pm, ESPNU		Maryland	**L** 80–88	0–1 (3–7)	Conte Forum; Chestnut Hill, MA
January 4, 2014; 4:00 pm, RSN/ESPN3		Clemson	**L** 60–62	0–2 (4–11)	Conte Forum; Chestnut Hill, MA
January 11, 2014; 12:00 noon, RSN/ESPN3		at Virginia Tech	**W** 62–59	1–2 (5–11)	Cassell Coliseum; Blacksburg, VA
January 13, 2014; 9:00 pm, ESPNU		No. 2 Syracuse	**L** 59–69	1–3 (5–12)	Conte Forum; Chestnut Hill, MA
January 18, 2014; 12:00 noon, ESPN/2		at North Carolina	**L** 71–82	1–4 (5–13)	Dean Smith Center; Chapel, Hill, NC
January 21, 2014; 9:00 pm, ESPNU		Georgia Tech	**L** 60–68	1–5 (5–14)	Conte Forum; Chestnut Hill, MA
January 29, 2014; 7:00 pm, RSN/ESPN3		Virginia Tech	**W** 76–52	2–5 (6–14)	Conte Forum; Chestnut Hill, MA
February 1, 2014; 12:00 noon, ACCN		at Notre Dame	**L** 73–76 ^{OT}	2–6 (6–15)	Edmund P. Joyce Center; South Bend, IN
February 5, 2014; 7:00 pm, ESPN2		at No. 20 Virginia	**L** 67–77	2–7 (6–16)	John Paul Jones Arena; Charlottesville, VA
February 8, 2014; 6:00 pm, ESPN		No. 11 Duke	**L** 68–89	2–8 (6–17)	Conte Forum; Chestnut Hill, MA
February 13, 2014; 5:00 pm, RSN/ESPN3		at Georgia Tech	**L** 71–74	2–9 (6–18)	McCamish Pavilion; Atlanta, GA
February 16, 2014; 6:00 pm, ESPNU		Notre Dame	**L** 69–73	2–10 (6–19)	Conte Forum; Chestnut Hill, MA
February 19, 2014; 7:00 pm, ESPN2		at No. 1 Syracuse	**W** 62–59 ^{OT}	3–10 (7–19)	Carrier Dome; Syracuse, NY
February 22, 2014; 12:00 noon, ACCN/ESPN3		at Miami (FL)	**L** 42–69	3–11 (7–20)	Bank United Center; Coral Gables, FL
February 26, 2014; 8:00 pm, ACCN/ESPN3		Pittsburgh	**L** 59–66	3–12 (7–21)	Conte Forum; Chestnut Hill, MA
March 1, 2014; 4:00 pm, RSN/ESPN3		at Wake Forest	**W** 80–72	4–12 (8–21)	LJVM Coliseum; Winston-Salem, NC
March 4, 2014; 9:00 pm, ESPNU		Florida State	**L** 70–74	4–13 (8–22)	Conte Forum; Chestnut Hill, MA
March 9, 2014; 6:00 pm, ESPNU		at North Carolina State	**L** 68–78	4–14 (8–23)	PNC Arena; Raleigh, NC
2014 ACC tournament
March 12, 2014; 7:00 pm, ESPN2		vs. Georgia Tech; ACC tournament first round	**L** 70–73 ^{OT}	8–24	Greensboro Coliseum; Greensboro, NC
*Non-conference game. ^{#}Rankings from AP Poll. (#) Tournament seedings in parentheses. All times are in Eastern Time.

=== Clemson ===
Date time, TV	Rank^{#}	Opponent^{#}	Result	Record	Site city, state
ACC regular season
January 4, 2014; 4:00 pm, RSN		at Boston College	**W** 62–60	1–0 (10–3)	Conte Forum; Chestnut Hill, MA
January 9, 2014; 7:00 pm, RSN		Florida State	**L** 41–56	1–1 (10–4)	Littlejohn Coliseum; Clemson, SC
January 11, 2014; 2:00 pm, RSN		No. 16 Duke	**W** 72–59	2–1 (11–4)	Littlejohn Coliseum; Clemson, SC
January 15, 2014; 7:00 pm, RSN		at Virginia Tech	**W** 56–49	3–1 (12–4)	Cassell Coliseum; Blacksburg, VA
January 18, 2014; 4:00 pm, ACCN		Wake Forest	**W** 61–53	4–1 (13–4)	Littlejohn Coliseum; Clemson, SC
January 21, 2014; 8:00 pm, ACCN		at Pittsburgh	**L** 43–76	4–2 (13–5)	Petersen Events Center; Pittsburgh, PA
January 26, 2014; 6:00 pm, ESPNU		at North Carolina	**L** 61–80	4–3 (13–6)	Dean E. Smith Center; Chapel Hill, NC
February 1, 2014; 4:00 pm, ESPN2		at Florida State	**W** 53–49	5–3 (14–6)	Donald L. Tucker Center; Tallahassee, FL
February 4, 2014; 8:00 pm, ACCN		Georgia Tech	**W** 45–41	6–3 (15–6)	Littlejohn Coliseum; Clemson, SC
February 9, 2014; 6:00 pm, ESPNU		at No. 1 Syracuse	**L** 44–57	6–4 (15–7)	Carrier Dome; Syracuse, NY
February 11, 2014; 7:00 pm, RSN		at Notre Dame	**L** 64–68 ^{2OT}	6–5 (15–8)	Purcell Pavilion; South Bend, IN
February 15, 2014; 12:00 noon, ESPN2		No. 17 Virginia	**L** 58–63	6–6 (15–9)	Littlejohn Coliseum; Clemson, SC
February 18, 2014; 7:00 pm, ESPNU		NC State	**W** 73–56	7–6 (16–9)	Littlejohn Coliseum; Clemson, SC
February 22, 2014; 12:00 noon, RSN		at Georgia Tech	**W** 63–55	8–6 (17–9)	McCamish Pavilion; Atlanta, GA
February 25, 2014; 7:00 pm, RSN		at Wake Forest	**L** 57–62	8–7 (17–10)	LJVM Coliseum; Winston-Salem, NC
March 2, 2014; 7:00 pm, ACCN		Maryland	**W** 77–73 ^{2OT}	9–7 (18–10)	Littlejohn Coliseum; Clemson, SC
March 4, 2014; 8:00 pm, ACCN		Miami	**W** 58–54	10–7 (19–10)	Littlejohn Coliseum; Clemson, SC
March 8, 2014; 4:00 pm, ACCN		Pittsburgh	**L** 78–83 ^{OT}	10–8 (19–11)	Littlejohn Coliseum; Clemson, SC
2014 ACC tournament
March 13, 2014; 9:00 pm, ESPN		vs. Georgia Tech; ACC tournament second round	**W** 69–65 ^{OT}	20–11	Greensboro Coliseum; Greensboro, NC
March 14, 2014; 9:00 pm, ESPN		vs. No. 7 Duke; ACC tournament quarterfinals	**L** 62–63	20–12	Greensboro Coliseum; Greensboro, NC
*Non-conference game. ^{#}Rankings from AP Poll. (#) Tournament seedings in parentheses. All times are in Eastern Time..

=== Duke ===
Date time, TV	Rank^{#}	Opponent^{#}	Result	Record	Site city, state
ACC regular season
January 4, 2014; 4:00 pm, CBS	No. 7	at Notre Dame	**L** 77–79	0–1 (11–3)	Edmund P. Joyce Center; South Bend, IN
January 7, 2014; 7:00 pm, ESPNU	No. 16	Georgia Tech	**W** 79–57	1–1 (12–3)	Cameron Indoor Stadium; Durham, NC
January 11, 2014; 2:00 pm, RSN	No. 16	at Clemson	**L** 59–72	1–2 (12–4)	Littlejohn Coliseum; Clemson, SC
January 13, 2014; 7:00 pm, ESPN	No. 23	Virginia	**W** 69–65	2–2 (13–4)	Cameron Indoor Stadium; Durham, NC
January 18, 2014; 2:00 pm, CBS		NC State	**W** 95–60	3–2 (14–4)	Cameron Indoor Stadium; Durham, NC
January 22, 2014; 7:30 pm, ESPN2	No. 18	at Miami (FL)	**W** 67–46	4–2 (15–4)	BankUnited Center; Coral Gables, FL
January 25, 2014; 12:00 noon, ESPN	No. 18	Florida State	**W** 78–56	5–2 (16–4)	Cameron Indoor Stadium; Durham, NC
January 27, 2014; 7:00 pm, ESPN	No. 17	at No. 18 Pittsburgh	**W** 80–65	6–2 (17–4)	Petersen Events Center; Pittsburgh, PA
February 1, 2014; 6:30 pm, ESPN	No. 17	at No. 2 Syracuse; College GameDay	**L** 89–91 ^{OT}	6–3 (17–5)	Carrier Dome; Syracuse, NY
February 4, 2014; 9:00 pm, ESPNU	No. 11	Wake Forest	**W** 83–63	7–3 (18–5)	Cameron Indoor Stadium; Durham, NC
February 8, 2014; 6:00 pm, ESPN	No. 11	at Boston College	**W** 89–68	8–3 (19–5)	Conte Forum; Chestnut Hill, MA
February 15, 2014; 6:00 pm, ESPN	No. 8	Maryland; Duke–Maryland basketball rivalry	**W** 69–67	9–3 (20–5)	Cameron Indoor Stadium; Durham, NC
February 18, 2014; 9:00 pm, ACCN	No. 5	at Georgia Tech	**W** 68–51	10–3 (21–5)	Hank McCamish Pavilion; Atlanta, GA
February 20, 2014; 9:00 pm, ESPN/ACCN	No. 5	at North Carolina; Carolina–Duke rivalry	**L** 66–74	10–4 (21–6)	Dean Smith Center; Chapel Hill, NC
February 22, 2014; 6:00 pm, ESPN	No. 5	No. 1 Syracuse	**W** 66–60	11–4 (22–6)	Cameron Indoor Stadium; Durham, NC
February 25, 2014; 7:00 pm, ESPNU	No. 6	Virginia Tech	**W** 66–48	12–4 (21–6)	Cameron Indoor Stadium; Durham, NC
March 5, 2014; 7:00 pm, ESPN2	No. 4	at Wake Forest	**L** 72–82	12–5 (23–7)	LJVM Coliseum; Winston-Salem, NC
March 8, 2014; 9:00 pm, ESPN	No. 4	No. 14 North Carolina; College GameDay/Rivalry	**W** 93–81	13–5 (24–7)	Cameron Indoor Stadium; Durham, NC
2014 ACC tournament
March 14, 2014; 9:00 pm, ESPN	No. 7	vs. Clemson; ACC tournament quarterfinal	**W** 63–62	25–7	Greensboro Coliseum; Greensboro, NC
March 15, 2014; 3:00 pm, ESPN	No. 7	vs. NC State; ACC tournament semifinal	**W** 75–67	26–7	Greensboro Coliseum; Greensboro, NC
March 16, 2014; 1:00 pm, ESPN	No. 7	vs. No. 6 Virginia; ACC tournament finals	**L** 63–72	26–8	Greensboro Coliseum; Greensboro, NC
2014 NCAA tournament
March 21, 2014; 12:15 pm, CBS	No. (3)	vs. No. (14) Mercer; NCAA Midwest Region Second Round	**L** 71–78	26–9	PNC Arena; Raleigh, NC
*Non-conference game. ^{#}Rankings from AP Poll. (#) Tournament seedings in parentheses. All times are in Eastern Time.

=== Florida State ===
Date time, TV	Rank^{#}	Opponent^{#}	Result	Record	Site city, state
ACC regular season
January 4, 2014; 5:00 pm, ESPN2		Virginia	**L** 50–62	0–1 (9–4)	Donald L. Tucker Center; Tallahassee, FL
January 9, 2014; 7:00 pm, RSN		at Clemson	**W** 56–41	1–1 (10–4)	Littlejohn Coliseum; Clemson, SC
January 12, 2014; 8:00 pm, ESPNU		Maryland	**W** 81–65	2–1 (11–4)	Donald L. Tucker Center; Tallahassee, FL
January 15, 2014; 9:00 pm, ACCN		at Miami (FL)	**W** 63–53	3–1 (12–4)	BankUnited Center; Coral Gables, FL
January 18, 2014; 12:00 noon, ACCN		at Virginia	**L** 66–78	3–2 (12–5)	John Paul Jones Arena; Charlottesville, VA
January 21, 2014; 8:00 pm, ACCN		Notre Dame	**W** 76–74	4–2 (13–5)	Donald L. Tucker Center; Tallahassee, FL
January 25, 2014; 12:00 noon, ESPN/ESPN2		at No. 18 Duke	**L** 56–78	4–3 (13–6)	Cameron Indoor Stadium; Durham, NC
January 29, 2014; 9:00 pm, ACCN		at NC State	**L** 70–74	4–4 (13–7)	PNC Arena; Raleigh, NC
February 1, 2014; 4:00 pm, ESPN2		Clemson	**L** 49–53	4–5 (13–8)	Donald L. Tucker Center; Tallahassee, FL
February 5, 2014; 9:00 pm, RSN		Virginia Tech	**W** 70–50	5–5 (14–8)	Donald L. Tucker Center; Tallahassee, FL
February 8, 2014; 3:00 pm, ESPN2		at Maryland	**L** 71–83	5–6 (14–9)	Comcast Center; College Park, MD
February 10, 2014; 9:00 pm, ESPNU		Miami (FL)	**L** 73–77	5–7 (14–10)	Donald L. Tucker Center; Tallahassee, FL
February 15, 2014; 8:00 pm, RSN		at Wake Forest	**W** 67–60	6–7 (15–10)	LJVM Coliseum; Winston-Salem, NC
February 17, 2014; 7:00 pm, ESPN		North Carolina	**L** 75–81	6–8 (15–11)	Donald L. Tucker Center; Tallahassee, FL
February 23, 2014; 6:00 pm, ESPNU		at Pittsburgh	**W** 71–66	7–8 (16–11)	Peterson Events Center; Pittsburgh, PA
March 2, 2014; 6:00 pm, ESPNU		Georgia Tech	**W** 81–71	8–8 (17–11)	Donald L. Tucker Center; Tallahassee, FL
March 4, 2014; 9:00 pm, ESPNU		at Boston College	**W** 74–70	9–8 (18–11)	Conte Forum; Chestnut Hill, MA
March 9, 2014; 2:00 pm, ACCN		No. 7 Syracuse	**L** 58–74	9–9 (18–12)	Donald L. Tucker Center; Tallahassee, FL
2014 ACC tournament
March 13, 2014; 12:00 pm, ESPN		vs. Maryland; ACC tournament second round	**W** 67–65	19–12	Greensboro Coliseum; Greensboro, NC
March 14, 2014; 12:00 pm, ESPN2		vs. No. 6 Virginia; ACC tournament quarterfinals	**L** 51–64	19–13	Greensboro Coliseum; Greensboro, NC
*Non-conference game. ^{#}Rankings from AP Poll. (#) Tournament seedings in parentheses. All times are in Eastern Time.

=== Georgia Tech ===
Date time, TV	Rank^{#}	Opponent^{#}	Result	Record	Site city, state
ACC regular season
January 4, 2014; 2:00 pm, ACCN		Maryland	**L** 61–77	0–1 (9–5)	Comcast Center; College Park, MD
January 7, 2014; 7:00 pm, ESPNU		No. 16 Duke	**L** 57–79	0–2 (9–6)	Cameron Indoor Stadium; Durham, NC
January 11, 2014; 12:00 noon, ACCN		Notre Dame	**W** 74–69	1–2 (10–6)	McCamish Pavilion; Atlanta, GA
January 14, 2014; 9:00 pm, ESPNU		No. 22 Pittsburgh	**L** 74–81	1–3 (10–7)	McCamish Pavilion; Atlanta, GA
January 18, 2014; 2:00 pm, RSN		Miami	**L** 42–56	1–4 (10–8)	McCamish Pavilion; Atlanta, GA
January 21, 2014; 9:00 pm, ESPNU		Boston College	**W** 68–60	2–4 (11–8)	Conte Forum; Chestnut Hill, MA
January 26, 2014; 1:00 pm, ACCN		NC State	**L** 78–80 ^{OT}	2–5 (11–9)	PNC Arena; Raleigh, NC
January 29, 2014; 7:00 pm, ESPN2		No. 19 North Carolina	**L** 65–78	2–6 (11–10)	McCamish Pavilion; Atlanta, GA
February 1, 2014; 12:00 noon, RSN		Wake Forest	**W** 79–70	3–6 (12–10)	LJVM Coliseum; Winston-Salem, NC
February 4, 2014; 8:00 pm, ACCN		Clemson	**L** 41–45	3–7 (12–11)	Littlejohn Coliseum; Clemson, SC
February 8, 2014; 12:00 noon, ACCN		No. 20 Virginia	**L** 45–64	3–8 (12–12)	McCamish Pavilion; Atlanta, GA
February 13, 2014; 5:00 pm, RSN		Boston College	**W** 74–71	4–8 (13–12)	McCamish Pavilion; Atlanta, GA
February 18, 2014; 9:00 pm, ACCN		No. 5 Duke	**L** 51–68	4–9 (13–13)	McCamish Pavilion; Atlanta, GA
February 22, 2014; 12:00 noon, RSN		Clemson	**L** 55–63	4–10 (13–14)	McCamish Pavilion; Atlanta, GA
February 26, 2014; 7:00 pm, ESPN2		at Notre Dame	**L** 62–65	4–11 (13–15)	Joyce Center; South Bend, IN
March 2, 2014; 6:00 pm, ESPNU		at Florida State	**L** 71–81	4–12 (13–16)	Donald L. Tucker Center; Tallahassee, FL
March 4, 2014; 7:00 pm, RSN		at No. 7 Syracuse	**W** 67–62	5–12 (14–16)	Carrier Dome; Syracuse, NY
March 8, 2014; 2:00 pm, ESPN/ESPN2		Virginia Tech	**W** 62–51	6–12 (15–16)	McCamish Pavilion; Atlanta, GA
ACC men's basketball tournament
March 12, 2014; 7:00 pm, ESPN2		vs. Boston College; ACC tournament first round	**W** 73–70 ^{OT}	16–16	Greensboro Coliseum; Greensboro, NC
March 13, 2014; 7:00 pm, ESPN		vs. Clemson; ACC tournament second round	**L** 65–69 ^{OT}	16–17	Greensboro Coliseum; Greensboro, NC
*Non-conference game. ^{#}Rankings from AP Poll. (#) Tournament seedings in parentheses. All times are in Eastern Time.

=== Maryland ===
Date time, TV	Rank^{#}	Opponent^{#}	Result	Record	Site city, state
ACC regular season
December 12, 2013; 7:00 pm, ESPNU		at Boston College	**W** 88–80	1–0 (6–4)	Conte Forum; Chestnut Hill, MA
January 4, 2014; 2:00 pm, ACCN		Georgia Tech	**W** 77–61	2–0 (10–5)	Comcast Center; College Park, MD
January 6, 2014; 7:00 pm, ESPN2		at Pittsburgh	**L** 59–79	2–1 (10–6)	Petersen Events Center; Pittsburgh, PA
January 12, 2014; 8:00 pm, ESPNU		at Florida State	**L** 61–85	2–2 (10–7)	Donald L. Tucker Center; Tallahassee, FL
January 15, 2014; 7:00 pm, ESPN2		Notre Dame	**W** 74–66	3–2 (11–7)	Comcast Center; College Park, MD
January 20, 2014; 9:00 pm, ESPNU		at NC State	**L** 56–65	3–3 (11–8)	PNC Arena; Raleigh, NC
January 25, 2014; 6:00 pm, ESPN		Pittsburgh	**L** 79–83	3–4 (11–9)	Comcast Center; College Park, MD
January 29, 2014; 9:00 pm, ACCN		Miami	**W** 74–71	4–4 (12–9)	Comcast Center; College Park, MD
February 1, 2014; 12:00 noon, ACCN		at Virginia Tech	**W** 80–60	5–4 (13–9)	Cassell Coliseum; Blacksburg, VA
February 4, 2014; 12:00 noon, ACCN		at North Carolina	**L** 63–75	5–5 (13–10)	Dean E. Smith Center; Chapel Hill, NC
February 8, 2014; 3:00 pm, ESPN2		Florida State	**W** 83–71	6–5 (14–10)	Comcast Center; College Park, MD
February 10, 2014; 7:00 pm, ESPN		at No. 17 Virginia	**L** 53–61	6–6 (14–11)	John Paul Jones Arena; Charlottesville, VA
February 15, 2014; 6:00 pm, ESPN		at No. 8 Duke	**L** 67–69	6–7 (14–12)	Cameron Indoor Stadium; Durham, NC
February 18, 2014; 7:00 pm, RSN		Wake Forest	**W** 71–60	7–7 (15–12)	Comcast Center; College Park, MD
February 24, 2014; 7:00 pm, ESPN		No. 4 Syracuse	**L** 55–57	7–8 (15–13)	Comcast Center; College Park, MD
March 2, 2014; 1:00 pm, ACCN		at Clemson	**L** 73–77 ^{2OT}	7–9 (15–14)	Littlejohn Coliseum; Clemson, SC
March 4, 2014; 8:00 pm, ACCN		Virginia Tech	**W** 64–47	8–9 (16–14)	Comcast Center; College Park, MD
March 9, 2014; 12:00 noon, CBS		No. 5 Virginia	**W** 75–69 ^{OT}	9–9 (17–14)	Comcast Center; College Park, MD
2014 ACC tournament
March 13, 2014; 12:00 pm, ESPN		vs. Florida State; ACC tournament second round	**L** 65–67	17–15	Greensboro Coliseum; Greensboro, NC
*Non-conference game. ^{#}Rankings from AP Poll. (#) Tournament seedings in parentheses. All times are in Eastern Time.

=== Miami ===
Date time, TV	Rank^{#}	Opponent^{#}	Result	Record	Site city, state
ACC regular season
December 8, 2013; 12:30 pm, ESPNU		Virginia Tech	**L** 60–61 ^{OT}	0–1 (5–5)	BankUnited Center; Coral Gables, FL
January 4, 2014; 2:00 pm, ACCN		at No. 2 Syracuse	**L** 44–49	0–2 (8–6)	Carrier Dome; Syracuse, NY
January 8, 2014; 9:00 pm, ESPN2		at North Carolina	**W** 63–57	1–2 (9–6)	Dean E. Smith Center; Chapel Hill, NC
January 15, 2014; 9:00 pm, ACCN		Florida State	**L** 53–63	1–3 (9–7)	BankUnited Center; Coral Gables, FL
January 18, 2014; 2:00 pm, RSN		at Georgia Tech	**W** 56–42	2–3 (10–7)	McCamish Pavilion; Atlanta, GA
January 22, 2014; 7:30 pm, ESPN2		No. 18 Duke	**L** 46–67	2–4 (10–8)	BankUnited Center; Coral Gables, FL
January 25, 2014; 1:00 pm, CBS		No. 2 Syracuse	**L** 52–64	2–5 (10–9)	BankUnited Center; Coral Gables, FL
January 29, 2014; 9:00 pm, RSN		at Maryland	**L** 71–74	2–6 (10–10)	Comcast Center; College Park, MD
February 5, 2014; 7:00 pm, RSN		No. 25 Pittsburgh	**L** 55–59 ^{OT}	2–7 (10–11)	BankUnited Center; Coral Gables, FL
February 8, 2014; 2:00 pm, RSN		NC State	**L** 55–56	2–8 (10–12)	BankUnited Center; Coral Gables, FL
February 10, 2014; 9:00 pm, ESPNU		at Florida State	**W** 77–73	3–8 (11–12)	Donald L. Tucker Center; Tallahassee, FL
February 15, 2014; 6:00 pm, ACCN		at Virginia Tech	**L** 45–52	3–9 (12–13)	Cassell Coliseum; Blacksburg, VA
February 19, 2014; 9:00 pm, RSN		Notre Dame	**W** 71–64	4–9 (13–13)	BankUnited Center; Coral Gables, FL
February 22, 2014; 12:00 noon, ACCN		Boston College	**W** 69–42	5–9 (14–13)	BankUnited Center; Coral Gables, FL
February 26, 2014; 7:00 pm, RSN		at No. 12 Virginia	**L** 40–65	5–10 (14–14)	John Paul Jones Arena; Charlottesville, VA
March 1, 2014; 12:00 noon, ACCN		at NC State	**W** 85–70	6–10 (15–14)	PNC Arena; Raleigh, NC
March 4, 2014; 8:00 pm, ACCN		at Clemson	**L** 54–58	6–11 (15–15)	Littlejohn Coliseum; Clemson, SC
March 8, 2014; 2:00 pm, RSN		Wake Forest	**W** 69–56	7–11 (16–15)	BankUnited Center; Coral Gables, FL
2014 ACC tournament
March 12, 2014; 3:00 pm, ESPN2		vs. Virginia Tech; ACC tournament first round	**W** 57–53	17–15	Greensboro Coliseum; Greensboro, NC
March 13, 2014; 7:00 pm, ESPN		vs. NC State; ACC tournament second round	**L** 57–68	17–16	Greensboro Coliseum; Greensboro, NC
*Non-conference game. ^{#}Rankings from AP Poll. (#) Tournament seedings in parentheses. All times are in Eastern Time..

=== North Carolina ===
Date time, TV	Rank^{#}	Opponent^{#}	Result	Record	Site city, state
ACC regular season
January 5, 2014; 8:00 pm, ESPNU	No. 19	at Wake Forest	**L** 67–73	0–1 (10–4)	LJVM Coliseum; Winston-Salem, NC
January 8, 2014; 9:00 pm, ESPN2		Miami	**L** 57–63	0–2 (10–5)	Dean E. Smith Center; Chapel Hill, NC
January 11, 2014; 12:00 noon, ESPN		at No. 2 Syracuse	**L** 45–57	0–3 (10–6)	Carrier Dome; Syracuse, NY
January 18, 2014; 12:00 noon, ESPN2		Boston College	**W** 82–71	1–3 (11–6)	Dean E. Smith Center; Chapel Hill, NC
January 20, 2014; 7:00 pm, ESPN		at Virginia	**L** 61–76	1–4 (11–7)	John Paul Jones Arena; Charlottesville, VA
January 26, 2014; 6:00 pm, ESPNU		Clemson	**W** 80–61	2–4 (12–7)	Dean E. Smith Center; Chapel Hill, NC
January 29, 2014; 7:00 pm, ESPN2		at Georgia Tech	**W** 78–65	3–4 (13–7)	McCamish Pavilion; Atlanta, GA
February 1, 2014; 2:00 pm, ESPN		NC State	**W** 84–70	4–4 (14–7)	Dean E. Smith Center; Chapel Hill, NC
February 4, 2014; 7:00 pm, ACCN		Maryland	**W** 75–63	5–4 (15–7)	Dean E. Smith Center; Chapel Hill, NC
February 8, 2014; 12:00 noon, ACCN		at Notre Dame	**W** 73–62	6–4 (16–7)	Purcell Pavilion; South Bend, IN
February 15, 2014; 1:00 pm, CBS		No. 25 Pittsburgh	**W** 75–71	7–4 (17–7)	Dean E. Smith Center; Chapel Hill, NC
February 17, 2014; 7:00 pm, ESPN		at Florida State	**W** 81–75	8–4 (18–7)	Donald L. Tucker Center; Tallahassee, FL
February 20, 2014; 9:00 pm, ESPN		No. 5 Duke; Carolina–Duke rivalry	**W** 74–66	9–4 (19–7)	Dean E. Smith Center; Chapel Hill, NC
February 22, 2014; 12:00 noon, ACCN		Wake Forest	**W** 105–72	10–4 (20–7)	Dean E. Smith Center; Chapel Hill, NC
February 26, 2014; 8:00 pm, ACCN	No. 19	at NC State	**W** 85–84 ^{OT}	11–4 (21–7)	PNC Arena; Raleigh, NC
March 1, 2014; 2:30 pm, ACCN	No. 19	at Virginia Tech	**W** 60–56	12–4 (22–7)	Cassell Coliseum; Blacksburg, VA
March 3, 2014; 7:00 pm, ESPN	No. 14	Notre Dame	**W** 63–61	13–4 (23–7)	Dean E. Smith Center; Chapel Hill, NC
March 8, 2014; 9:00 pm, ESPN		at Duke; College GameDay/Rivalry	**L** 81–93	13–5 (23–8)	Cameron Indoor Stadium; Durham, NC
2014 ACC tournament
March 14, 2014; 2:00 pm, ESPN2	No. 15	vs. Pittsburgh; ACC tournament quarterfinal	**L** 75–80	23–9	Greensboro Coliseum; Greensboro, NC
2014 NCAA tournament
March 21, 2014; 7:20 pm, TNT	No. (6)	vs. No. (11) Providence; NCAA East Region Second Round	**W** 79–77	24–9	AT&T Center; San Antonio, TX
March 23, 2014; 5:15 pm, CBS	No. (6)	vs. No. (3) Iowa State; NCAA East Region Third Round	**L** 83–85	24–10	AT&T Center; San Antonio, TX
*Non-conference game. ^{#}Rankings from AP Poll. (#) Tournament seedings in parentheses. All times are in Eastern Time..

=== N.C. State ===
Date time, TV	Rank^{#}	Opponent^{#}	Result	Record	Site city, state
ACC regular season
January 4, 2014; 12:00 noon, ACCN		Pittsburgh	**L** 62–74	0–1 (10–4)	PNC Arena; Raleigh, NC
January 7, 2014; 9:00 pm, ACCN		at Notre Dame	**W** 77–70	1–1 (11–4)	Edmund P. Joyce Center; South Bend, IN
January 11, 2014; 5:00 pm, ESPN2		Virginia	**L** 45–76	1–2 (11–5)	PNC Arena; Raleigh, NC
January 15, 2014; 9:00 pm, ACCN		at Wake Forest	**L** 69–70	1–3 (11–6)	LJVM Coliseum; Winston-Salem, NC
January 18, 2014; 2:00 pm, CBS		at Duke	**L** 60–95	1–4 (11–7)	Cameron Indoor Stadium; Durham, NC
January 20, 2014; 9:00 pm, ESPNU		Maryland	**W** 65–56	2–4 (12–7)	PNC Arena; Raleigh, NC
January 26, 2014; 1:00 pm, ESPNU		Georgia Tech	**W** 80–78 ^{OT}	3–4 (13–7)	PNC Arena; Raleigh, NC
January 29, 2014; 9:00 pm, ACCN		Florida State	**W** 74–70	4–4 (14–7)	PNC Arena; Raleigh, NC
February 1, 2014; 2:00 pm, ESPN/2		at North Carolina	**L** 70–84	4–5 (14–8)	Dean Smith Center; Chapel Hill, NC
February 8, 2014; 2:00 pm, RSN		at Miami	**W** 56–55	5–5 (15–8)	BankUnited Center; Coral Gables, FL
February 11, 2014; 7:00 pm, ESPNU		Wake Forest	**W** 82–67	6–5 (16–8)	PNC Arena; Raleigh, NC
February 15, 2014; 3:00 pm, ACCN		at No. 1 Syracuse	**L** 55–56	6–6 (16–9)	Carrier Dome; Syracuse, NY
February 18, 2014; 7:00 pm, ESPNU		at Clemson	**L** 56–73	6–7 (16–10)	Littlejohn Coliseum; Clemson, SC
February 22, 2014; 2:00 pm, RSN		at Virginia Tech	**L** 64–71	7–7 (17–10)	Cassell Coliseum; Blacksburg, VA
February 26, 2014; 8:00 pm, ACCN		No. 19 North Carolina	**L** 84–85 ^{OT}	7–8 (17–11)	PNC Arena; Raleigh, NC
March 1, 2014; 12:00 noon, ACCN		Miami	**L** 70–85	7–9 (17–12)	PNC Arena; Raleigh, NC
March 3, 2014; 9:00 pm, ESPNU		at Pittsburgh	**W** 74–67	8–9 (18–12)	Petersen Events Center; Pittsburgh, PA
March 9, 2014; 6:00 pm, ESPNU		Boston College	**W** 78–68	9–9 (19–12)	PNC Arena; Raleigh, NC
2014 ACC tournament
March 13, 2014; 7:00 pm, ESPN		vs. Miami; ACC tournament second round	**W** 67–58	20–12	Greensboro Coliseum; Greensboro, NC
March 14, 2014; 7:00 pm, ESPN		vs. No. 11 Syracuse; ACC tournament quarterfinals	**W** 66–63	21–12	Greensboro Coliseum; Greensboro, NC
March 15, 2014; 3:00 pm, ESPN		vs. No. 7 Duke; ACC tournament semifinals	**L** 67–75	21–13	Greensboro Coliseum; Greensboro, NC
2014 NCAA tournament
March 18, 2014; 9:10 pm, truTV	No. (12)	vs. No. (12) Xavier; NCAA Midwest Region First Round	**W** 74–69	22–13	Dayton Arena; Dayton, OH
March 20, 2014; 7:20 pm, TNT	No. (12)	vs. No. (5) St. Louis; NCAA Midwest Region Second Round	**L** 80–83 ^{OT}	22–14	Amway Arena; Orlando, FL
*Non-conference game. ^{#}Rankings from AP Poll. (#) Tournament seedings in parentheses. All times are in Eastern Time..

=== Notre Dame ===
Date time, TV	Rank^{#}	Opponent^{#}	Result	Record	Site city, state
ACC regular season
January 4, 2014; 4:00 pm, CBS		No. 7 Duke	**W** 79–77	1–0 (10–4)	Purcell Pavilion; South Bend, IN
January 7, 2014; 9:00 pm, ACCN		NC State	**L** 70–77	1–1 (10–5)	Purcell Pavilion; South Bend, IN
January 11, 2014; 12:00 noon, ACCN		at Georgia Tech	**L** 69–74	1–2 (10–6)	McCamish Pavilion; Atlanta, GA
January 15, 2014; 7:00 pm, ESPN2		at Maryland	**L** 66–74	1–3 (10–7)	Comcast Center; College Park, MD
January 19, 2014; 6:00 pm, ESPNU		Virginia Tech	**W** 70–63	2–3 (11–7)	Purcell Pavilion; South Bend, IN
January 21, 2014; 8:00 pm, ACCN		at Florida State	**L** 74–76	2–4 (11–8)	Donald L. Tucker Center; Tallahassee, FL
January 25, 2014; 3:00 pm, ACCN		at Wake Forest	**L** 58–65	2–5 (11–9)	LJVM Coliseum; Winston-Salem, NC
January 28, 2014; 9:00 pm, ESPNU		Virginia	**L** 53–68	2–6 (11–10)	Purcell Pavilion; South Bend, IN
February 1, 2014; 12:00 noon, ACCN		Boston College	**W** 76–73 ^{OT}	3–6 (12–10)	Purcell Pavilion; South Bend, IN
February 3, 2014; 7:00 pm, ESPN		at No. 1 Syracuse	**L** 55–61	3–7 (12–11)	Carrier Dome; Syracuse, NY
February 8, 2014; 12:00 noon, ACCN		North Carolina	**L** 62–73	3–8 (12–12)	Purcell Pavilion; South Bend, IN
February 11, 2014; 7:00 pm		Clemson	**L** 64–68 ^{2OT}	4–8 (13–12)	Purcell Pavilion; South Bend, IN
February 16, 2014; 6:00 pm, ESPNU		at Boston College	**W** 73–69	5–8 (14–12)	Conte Forum; Chestnut Hill, MA
February 19, 2014; 9:00 pm, RSN		at Miami	**L** 64–71	5–9 (14–13)	BankUnited Center; Coral Gables, FL
February 22, 2014; 6:00 pm, ESPN2		at No. 14 Virginia	**L** 49–70	5–10 (14–14)	John Paul Jones Arena; Charlottesville, VA
February 26, 2014; 7:00 pm, ESPN2		Georgia Tech	**W** 65–62	6–10 (15–14)	Purcell Pavilion; South Bend, IN
March 1, 2014; 2:00 pm, ESPN2		Pittsburgh	**L** 81–85 ^{OT}	6–11 (15–15)	Purcell Pavilion; South Bend, IN
March 3, 2014; 7:00 pm, ESPN		at No. 14 North Carolina	**L** 61–63	6–12 (15–16)	Dean Smith Center; Chapel Hill, NC
2014 ACC tournament
March 12, 2014; 1:00 pm, ESPN2		vs. Wake Forest; ACC tournament first round	**L** 69–81	15–17	Greensboro Coliseum; Greensboro, NC
*Non-conference game. ^{#}Rankings from AP Poll. (#) Tournament seedings in parentheses. All times are in Central Time..

=== Pittsburgh ===
Date time, TV	Rank^{#}	Opponent^{#}	Result	Record	Site city, state
ACC regular season
January 4, 2014; 12:00 noon, ACCN		at NC State	**W** 74–62	1–0 (13–1)	PNC Arena; Raleigh, NC
January 6, 2014; 7:00 pm, ESPN2		Maryland	**W** 79–59	2–0 (14–1)	Petersen Events Center; Pittsburgh, PA
January 11, 2014; 12:00 noon, ACCN		Wake Forest	**W** 80–65	3–0 (15–1)	Petersen Events Center; Pittsburgh, PA
January 14, 2014; 9:00 pm, ESPNU	No. 22	at Georgia Tech	**W** 81–74	4–0 (16–1)	McCamish Pavilion; Atlanta, GA
January 18, 2014; 4:00 pm, ESPN/2	No. 22	at No. 2 Syracuse	**L** 54–59	4–1 (16–2)	Carrier Dome; Syracuse, NY
January 21, 2014; 8:00 pm, ACCN	No. 20	Clemson	**W** 76–43	5–1 (17–2)	Petersen Events Center; Pittsburgh, PA
January 25, 2014; 6:00 pm, ESPN2	No. 20	at Maryland	**W** 83–79	6–1 (18–2)	Comcast Center; College Park, MD
January 27, 2014; 7:00 pm, ESPN	No. 18	No. 17 Duke	**L** 65–80	6–2 (18–3)	Petersen Events Center; Pittsburgh, PA
February 2, 2014; 12:30 pm, ESPNU	No. 18	Virginia	**L** 45–48	6–3 (18–4)	Petersen Events Center; Pittsburgh, PA
February 5, 2014; 7:00 pm, RSN	No. 25	at Miami	**W** 59–55 ^{OT}	7–3 (19–4)	BankUnited Center; Coral Gables, FL
February 8, 2014; 12:00 noon, RSN	No. 25	Virginia Tech	**W** 62–57 ^{2OT}	8–3 (20–4)	Petersen Events Center; Pittsburgh, PA
February 12, 2014; 7:00 pm, ESPN	No. 25	No. 1 Syracuse	**L** 56–58	8–4 (20–5)	Petersen Events Center; Pittsburgh, PA
February 15, 2014; 1:00 pm, CBS	No. 25	at North Carolina	**L** 71–75	8–5 (20–6)	Dean Smith Center; Chapel Hill, NC
February 23, 2014; 6:00 pm, ESPNU		Florida State	**L** 66–71	8–6 (20–7)	Petersen Events Center; Pittsburgh, PA
February 26, 2014; 8:00 pm, ACCN		at Boston College	**W** 66–59	9–6 (21–7)	Conte Forum; Chestnut Hill, MA
March 1, 2014; 2:00 pm, ESPN2		at Notre Dame	**W** 85–81 ^{OT}	10–6 (22–7)	Joyce Center; South Bend, IN
March 3, 2014; 9:00 pm, ESPNU		NC State	**L** 67–74	10–7 (22–8)	Petersen Events Center; Pittsburgh, PA
March 8, 2014; 4:00 pm, ACCN		at Clemson	**W** 83–78 ^{OT}	11–7 (23–8)	Littlejohn Coliseum; Clemson, SC
2014 ACC tournament
March 13, 2014; 2:00 pm, ESPN		vs. Wake Forest; ACC tournament second round	**W** 84–55	24–8	Greensboro Coliseum; Greensboro, NC
March 14, 2014; 2:00 pm, ESPN2		vs. No. 15 North Carolina; ACC tournament quarterfinals	**W** 80–75	25–8	Greensboro Coliseum; Greensboro, NC
March 15, 2014; 1:00 pm, ESPN		vs. No. 6 Virginia; ACC tournament semifinals	**L** 48–51	25–9	Greensboro Coliseum; Greensboro, NC
2014 NCAA tournament
March 20, 2014; 1:40 pm, TBS	No. (9)	vs. No. (8) Colorado; NCAA South Region Second Round	**W** 77–48	26–9	Amway Arena; Orlando, FL
March 22, 2014; 12:15 pm, CBS	No. (9)	vs. No. (1) Florida; NCAA South Region Third Round	**L** 45–61	26–10	Amway Arena; Orlando, FL
*Non-conference game. ^{#}Rankings from AP Poll. (#) Tournament seedings in parentheses. All times are in Eastern Time..

=== Syracuse ===
Date time, TV	Rank^{#}	Opponent^{#}	Result	Record	Site city, state
ACC regular season
January 4, 2014; 2:00 pm, ACCN	No. 2	Miami (FL)	**W** 49–44	1–0 (14–0)	Carrier Dome; Syracuse, NY
January 7, 2014; 9:00 pm, ACCN	No. 2	at Virginia Tech	**W** 72–52	2–0 (15–0)	Cassell Coliseum; Blacksburg, VA
January 11, 2014; 12:00 noon, ESPN	No. 2	North Carolina	**W** 57–45	3–0 (16–0)	Carrier Dome; Syracuse, NY
January 13, 2014; 9:00 pm, ESPNU	No. 2	at Boston College	**W** 69–59	4–0 (17–0)	Conte Forum; Chestnut Hill, MA
January 18, 2014; 4:00 pm, ESPN	No. 2	No. 22 Pittsburgh	**W** 59–54	5–0 (18–0)	Carrier Dome; Syracuse, NY
January 25, 2014; 1:00 pm, CBS	No. 2	at Miami (FL)	**W** 64–52	6–0 (19–0)	BankUnited Center; Coral Gables, FL
January 29, 2014; 9:00 pm, ACCN	No. 2	at Wake Forest	**W** 67–57	7–0 (20–0)	LJVM Coliseum; Winston-Salem, NC
February 1, 2014; 6:30 pm, ESPN	No. 2	No. 17 Duke; College GameDay	**W** 91–89 ^{OT}	8–0 (21–0)	Carrier Dome; Syracuse, NY
February 3, 2014; 7:00 pm, ESPN	No. 1	Notre Dame	**W** 61–55	9–0 (22–0)	Carrier Dome; Syracuse, NY
February 9, 2014; 6:00 pm, ESPNU	No. 1	Clemson	**W** 57–44	10–0 (23–0)	Carrier Dome; Syracuse, NY
February 12, 2014; 7:00 pm, ACCN	No. 1	at No. 25 Pittsburgh	**W** 58–56	11–0 (24–0)	Peterson Events Center; Pittsburgh, PA
February 15, 2014; 7:00 pm, ACCN	No. 1	at NC State	**W** 56–55	12–0 (25–0)	Carrier Dome; Syracuse, NY
February 19, 2014; 7:00 pm, ESPN2	No. 1	Boston College	**L** 59–62 ^{OT}	12–1 (25–1)	Carrier Dome; Syracuse, NY
February 22, 2014; 6:00 pm, ESPN2	No. 1	at No. 5 Duke	**L** 60–66	12–2 (25–2)	Cameron Indoor Stadium; Durham, NC
February 24, 2014; 7:00 pm, ESPN	No. 4	at Maryland	**W** 57–55	13–2 (26–2)	Comcast Center; College Park, MD
March 1, 2014; 4:00 pm, ACCN	No. 4	at No. 12 Virginia	**L** 56–75	13–3 (26–3)	John Paul Jones Arena; Charlottesville, VA
March 4, 2014; 7:00 pm, ACCN	No. 7	Georgia Tech	**L** 62–67	13–4 (26–4)	Carrier Dome; Syracuse, NY
March 9, 2014; 2:00 pm, ACCN	No. 7	at Florida State	**W** 74–58	14–4 (27–4)	Donald L. Tucker Center; Tallahassee, FL
2014 ACC tournament
March 14, 2014; 7:00 pm, ESPN2		vs. No. 11 NC State; ACC tournament quarterfinal	**L** 63–66	27–5	Greensboro Coliseum; Greensboro, NC
2014 NCAA tournament
March 20, 2014; 2:45 pm, CBS	No. (3)	vs. No. (14) Western Michigan; NCAA South Region Second Round	**W** 77–53	28–5	First Niagara Center; Buffalo, NY
March 22, 2014; 7:10 pm, TBS	No. (3)	vs. No. (11) Dayton; NCAA South Region Third Round	**L** 53–55	28–6	First Niagara Center; Buffalo, NY
*Non-conference game. ^{#}Rankings from AP Poll. (#) Tournament seedings in parentheses. All times are in Eastern Time..

=== Virginia ===
Date time, TV	Rank^{#}	Opponent^{#}	Result	Record	Site city, state
ACC regular season
January 4, 2014; 12:00 noon, ESPN2		at Florida State	**W** 62–50	1–0 (10–4)	Donald L. Tucker Center; Tallahassee, FL
January 8, 2014; 7:00 pm		Wake Forest	**W** 74–51	2–0 (11–4)	John Paul Jones Arena; Charlottesville, VA
January 11, 2014; 5:00 pm, ESPN2		at NC State	**W** 76–45	3–0 (12–4)	PNC Arena; Raleigh, NC
January 13, 2014; 7:00 pm, ESPN		at No. 23 Duke	**W** 69–65	3–1 (12–5)	Cameron Indoor Stadium; Durham, NC
January 18, 2014; 12:00 noon, ACCN		Florida State	**W** 78–66	4–1 (13–5)	John Paul Jones Arena; Charlottesville, VA
January 20, 2014; 7:00 pm, ESPN		North Carolina	**W** 76–61	5–1 (14–5)	John Paul Jones Arena; Charlottesville, VA
January 25, 2014; 3:00 pm, ACCN		Virginia Tech	**W** 65–45	6–1 (15–5)	John Paul Jones Arena; Charlottesville, VA
January 28, 2014; 9:00 pm, ESPNU		at Notre Dame	**W** 68–53	7–1 (16–5)	Joyce Center; South Bend, IN
February 2, 2014; 12:30 pm, ESPNU		at No. 18 Pittsburgh	**W** 48–45	8–1 (17–5)	Petersen Events Center; Pittsburgh, PA
February 5, 2014; 7:00 pm, ESPN2	No. 20	Boston College	**W** 77–67	9–1 (18–5)	John Paul Jones Arena; Charlottesville, VA
February 8, 2014; 12:00 noon, ACCN	No. 20	at Georgia Tech	**W** 64–45	10–1 (19–5)	Hank McCamish Pavilion; Atlanta, GA
February 10, 2014; 9:00 pm, ESPNU	No. 17	Maryland	**W** 61–53	11–1 (20–5)	John Paul Jones Arena; Charlottesville, VA
February 15, 2014; 12:00 noon, ESPN2	No. 17	at Clemson	**W** 63–58	12–1 (21–5)	Littlejohn Coliseum; Clemson, SC
February 18, 2014; 9:00 pm, ACCN	No. 14	at Virginia Tech	**W** 57–53	13–1 (22–5)	Cassell Coliseum; Blacksburg, VA
February 22, 2014; 2:00 pm, ESPN2	No. 14	Notre Dame	**W** 70–49	14–1 (23–5)	John Paul Jones Arena; Charlottesville, VA
February 26, 2014; 7:00 pm	No. 12	Miami (FL)	**W** 65–40	15–1 (24–5)	John Paul Jones Arena; Charlottesville, VA
March 1, 2014; 4:00 pm, ESPN	No. 12	No. 4 Syracuse	**W** 75–56	16–1 (25–5)	John Paul Jones Arena; Charlottesville, VA
March 9, 2014; 12:00 noon, CBS	No. 5	at Maryland	**L** 69–75 ^{OT}	16–2 (25–6)	Comcast Center; College Park, MD
2014 ACC tournament
March 14, 2014; 12:00 pm, ESPN2	No. 6	vs. Florida State; ACC tournament quarterfinals	**W** 64–51	26–6	Greensboro Coliseum; Greensboro, NC
March 15, 2014; 1:00 pm, ESPN	No. 6	vs. Pittsburgh; ACC tournament semifinals	**W** 51–48	27–6	Greensboro Coliseum; Greensboro, NC
March 16, 2014; 1:00 pm, ESPN	No. 6	vs. No. 7 Duke; ACC tournament finals	**W** 72–63	28–6	Greensboro Coliseum; Greensboro, NC
2014 NCAA tournament
March 21, 2014; 9:50 pm, TBS	No. (1)	vs. No. (16) Coastal Carolina; NCAA East Region Second Round	**W** 70–59	29–6	PNC Arena; Raleigh, NC
March 23, 2014; 8:57 pm, TNT	No. (1)	vs. No. (8) Memphis; NCAA East Region Third Round	**W** 78–60	30–6	PNC Arena; Raleigh, NC
March 28, 2014; 10:15 pm, TBS	No. (1)	vs. No. (4) Michigan State; NCAA East Region Semifinal	**L** 59–61	30–7	Madison Square Garden; New York, NY
*Non-conference game. ^{#}Rankings from AP Poll. (#) Tournament seedings in parentheses. All times are in Eastern Time..

=== Virginia Tech ===
Date time, TV	Rank^{#}	Opponent^{#}	Result	Record	Site city, state
ACC regular season
December 8, 2013; 12:30 pm, ESPNU		at Miami (FL)	**W** 61–60 ^{OT}	1–0 (7–3)	BankUnited Center; Coral Gables, FL
January 7, 2014; 9:00 pm, ACCN		No. 2 Syracuse	**L** 52–72	1–1 (8–6)	Cassell Coliseum; Blacksburg, VA
January 11, 2014; 12:00 noon, RSN		Boston College	**L** 59–62	1–2 (8–7)	Cassell Coliseum; Blacksburg, VA
January 15, 2014; 7:00 pm, RSN		Clemson	**L** 49–56	1–3 (8–8)	Cassell Coliseum; Blacksburg, VA
January 19, 2014; 6:00 pm, ESPNU		at Notre Dame	**L** 63–70	1–4 (8–9)	Edmund P. Joyce Center; South Bend, IN
January 22, 2014; 7:00 pm, RSN		Wake Forest	**L** 77–83	1–5 (8–10)	Cassell Coliseum; Blacksburg, VA
January 25, 2014; 3:00 pm, ACCN		at Virginia	**L** 45–65	1–6 (8–11)	John Paul Jones Arena; Charlottesville, VA
January 29, 2014; 7:00 pm, RSN		at Boston College	**L** 52–76	1–7 (8–12)	Conte Forum; Chestnut Hill, MA
February 1, 2014; 12:00 noon, ACCN		Maryland	**L** 60–80	1–8 (8–13)	Cassell Coliseum; Blacksburg, VA
February 5, 2014; 9:00 pm, RSN		at Florida State	**L** 50–70	1–9 (8–14)	Donald L. Tucker Center; Tallahassee, FL
February 8, 2014; 12:00 noon, RSN		at Pittsburgh	**L** 57–62 ^{2OT}	1–10 (8–15)	Petersen Events Center; Pittsburgh, PA
February 15, 2014; 6:00 pm, RSN		Miami (FL)	**W** 52–45	2–10 (9–15)	Cassell Coliseum; Blacksburg, VA
February 18, 2014; 9:00 pm, ACCN		No. 14 Virginia	**L** 53–57	2–11 (9–16)	Cassell Coliseum; Blacksburgh, VA
February 22, 2014; 2:00 pm, RSN		NC State	**L** 64–71	2–12 (9–17)	Cassell Coliseum; Blacksburg, VA
February 25, 2014; 7:00 pm, ESPNU		at No. 6 Duke	**L** 48–66	2–13 (9–18)	Cameron Indoor Stadium; Durham, NC
March 1, 2014; 2:30 pm, ACCN		No. 19 North Carolina	**L** 56–60	2–14 (9–19)	Cassell Coliseum; Blacksburg, VA
March 4, 2014; 8:00 pm, ACCN		at Maryland	**L** 47–64	2–15 (9–20)	Comcast Center; College Park, MD
March 8, 2014; 2:00 pm, ESPN2		at Georgia Tech	**L** 51–62	2–14 (9–21)	Hank McCamish Pavilion; Atlanta, GA
2014 ACC tournament
March 12, 2014; 3:00 pm, ESPN2		vs. Miami; ACC tournament first round	**L** 53–57	9–22	Greensboro Coliseum; Greensboro, NC
*Non-conference game. ^{#}Rankings from AP Poll. (#) Tournament seedings in parentheses. All times are in Eastern Time..

=== Wake Forest ===
Date time, TV	Rank^{#}	Opponent^{#}	Result	Record	Site city, state
ACC regular season
January 5, 2014; 8:00 pm, ESPNU		No. 19 North Carolina	**W** 73–67	1–0 (11–3)	LJVM Coliseum; Winston-Salem, NC
January 8, 2014; 7:00 pm, RSN		at Virginia	**L** 51–74	1–1 (11–4)	John Paul Jones Arena; Charlottesville, VA
January 11, 2014; 12:00 noon, ACCN		at Pittsburgh	**L** 65–80	1–2 (11–5)	Petersen Events Center; Pittsburgh, PA
January 15, 2014; 9:00 pm, ACCN		NC State	**W** 70–69	2–2 (12–5)	LJVM Coliseum; Winston-Salem, NC
January 18, 2014; 4:00 pm, ACCN		at Clemson	**L** 53–61	2–3 (12–6)	Littlejohn Coliseum; Clemson, SC
January 22, 2014; 4:00 pm, RSN		at Virginia Tech	**W** 83–77	3–3 (13–6)	Cassell Coliseum; Blacksburg, VA
January 25, 2014; 3:00 pm, ACCN		Notre Dame	**W** 65–58	4–3 (14–6)	LJVM Coliseum; Winston-Salem, NC
January 29, 2014; 9:00 pm, RSN		No. 2 Syracuse	**L** 57–67	4–4 (14–7)	LJVM Coliseum; Winston-Salem, NC
February 1, 2014; 12:00 noon, RSN		Georgia Tech	**L** 70–79	4–5 (14–8)	LJVM Coliseum; Winston-Salem, NC
February 4, 2014; 9:00 pm, ESPNU		at Duke	**L** 63–83	4–6 (14–9)	Cameron Indoor Stadium; Durham, NC
February 11, 2014; 7:00 pm, ESPNU		at NC State	**L** 67–82	4–7 (14–10)	PNC Arena; Raleigh, NC
February 15, 2014; 8:00 pm, RSN		Florida State	**L** 60–67	4–8 (14–11)	LJVM Coliseum; Winston-Salem, NC
February 18, 2014; 7:00 pm, RSN		at Maryland	**L** 60–71	4–9 (14–12)	Comcast Center; College Park, MD
February 22, 2014; 12:00 noon, ACCN		at North Carolina	**L** 72–105	4–10 (14–13)	Dean Smith Center; Chapel Hill, NC
February 25, 2014; 7:00 pm, RSN		Clemson	**W** 62–57	5–10 (15–13)	LJVM Coliseum; Winston-Salem, NC
March 1, 2014; 4:00 pm, RSN		Boston College	**L** 72–80	5–11 (15–14)	LJVM Coliseum; Winston-Salem, NC
March 5, 2014; 7:00 pm, ESPN2		No. 4 Duke	**W** 82–72	6–11 (16–14)	LJVM Coliseum; Winston-Salem, NC
March 8, 2014; 2:00 pm, RSN		at Miami	**L** 56–69	6–12 (16–15)	BankUnited Center; Coral Gables, FL
2014 ACC tournament
March 12, 2014; 1:00 pm, ESPN2		vs. Notre Dame; ACC tournament first round	**W** 81–69	17–15	Greensboro Coliseum; Greensboro, NC
March 13, 2014; 2:00 pm, ESPN		vs. Pittsburgh; ACC tournament second round	**L** 55–84	17–16	Greensboro Coliseum; Greensboro, NC
*Non-conference game. ^{#}Rankings from AP Poll. (#) Tournament seedings in parentheses. All times are in Eastern Time..

== Player of the week ==
Players of the week

Throughout the conference regular season, the Atlantic Coast Conference offices named one or two players of the week and one or two freshmen of the week each Monday.

Week	Player of the week	Freshman of the week
November 11, 2013	Trevor Cooney, Syracuse	Jabari Parker, Duke
November 18, 2013	Olivier Hanlan, Boston College	Jabari Parker (2), Duke
November 18, 2013	Jabari Parker, Duke	Jabari Parker (2), Duke
November 25, 2013	Marcus Paige, UNC	Jabari Parker (3), Duke
December 2, 2013	Lamar Patterson, Pitt	Tyler Ennis, Syracuse
December 9, 2013	Jarell Eddie, Va. Tech	Kennedy Meeks, UNC
December 16, 2013	Marcus Paige (2), UNC	Roddy Peters, Maryland
December 23, 2013	Aaron Thomas, Florida St	Jabari Parker (4), Duke
December 30, 2013	Eric Atkins, ND	Tyler Ennis (2), Syracuse
January 6, 2014	Eric Atkins (2), ND	Steve Vasturia, ND
January 13, 2014	Lamar Patterson (2), Pitt	Jaron Blossomgame, Clemson
January 20, 2014	Rasheed Sulaimon, Duke	Tyler Ennis (3), Syracuse
January 27, 2014	Lamar Patterson (3), Pitt	Jabari Parker (5), Duke
January 27, 2014	Travis McKie, Wake	Jabari Parker (5), Duke
February 3, 2014	C. J. Fair, Syracuse	Jabari Parker (6), Duke
February 3, 2014	C. J. Fair, Syracuse	Tyler Ennis (4), Syracuse
February 10, 2014	Jabari Parker (2), Duke	Jabari Parker (7), Duke
February 17, 2014	James Michael McAdoo, UNC	Jabari Parker (8), Duke
February 24, 2014	Marcus Paige (3), UNC	Jabari Parker (9), Duke
March 3, 2014	Malcolm Brogdon, UVA	Tyler Ennis (5), Syracuse
March 3, 2014	Marcus Paige (4), UNC	Tyler Ennis (5), Syracuse
March 10, 2014	T. J. Warren, NC State	Jabari Parker (10), Duke

== Honors and awards ==
=== All-ACC awards and teams ===
==== Coaches ====
**2014 ACC Men's Basketball Individual Awards**
Award	Recipient(s)
Player of the Year	**T. J. Warren**, F., NC STATE
Coach of the Year	**Tony Bennett**, VIRGINIA
Defensive Player of the Year	**K. J. McDaniels**, F., CLEMSON
Rookie of the Year	**Jabari Parker**, F., DUKE

**2014 ACC Men's Basketball All-Conference Teams**
First Team	Second Team	Third Team	Honorable Mention
C. J. Fair, Sr., F., SYRACUSE; K. J. McDaniels, Jr., F., CLEMSON; Marcus Paige, So., G., NORTH CAROLINA; Jabari Parker, Fr., F., DUKE; T. J. Warren, So., F., NC STATE	Malcolm Brogdon, So., G., VIRGINIA; Tyler Ennis, Fr., G., SYRACUSE; Rodney Hood, So., F., DUKE; James Michael McAdoo, Jr., F., NORTH CAROLINA; Lamar Patterson, Sr., F., PITTSBURGH	Rion Brown, Sr., G., MIAMI; Olivier Hanlan, So., F., BOSTON COLLEGE; Joe Harris, Sr., G., VIRGINIA; Daniel Miller, Sr., C., GEORGIA TECH; Dez Wells, Jr., G., MARYLAND	Ryan Anderson, Jr., F., BOSTON COLLEGE; Eric Atkins, Sr., G., NOTRE DAME; Jerami Grant, So., F., SYRACUSE; Akil Mitchell, Sr., F., VIRGINIA; Aaron Thomas, So., F., FLORIDA STATE; Talib Zanna, Sr., F., PITTSBURGH
† - denotes unanimous selection

== Postseason ==
=== ACC tournament ===
- March 12–16, 2014 Atlantic Coast Conference Basketball Tournament, Greensboro Coliseum, Greensboro.

**2014 ACC men's basketball tournament seeds and results**
Seed	School	Conf.	Over.	Tiebreaker	Tiebreaker 2	First Round March 12	Second Round March 13	Quarterfinals March 14	Semifinals March 15	Championship March 16
1.	Virginia^{†‡}	16-2	25-6			BYE	BYE	vs. #9 Florida State – **W, 64–51**	vs. #5 Pittsburgh – **W, 51–48**	vs. #3 Duke - **W, 72–63**
2.	Syracuse^{†}	14-4	27-4			BYE	BYE	vs. #7 NC State – **L, 63–66**		
3.	Duke^{†}	13-5	24-7	1-1 vs. UNC	1-0 vs. UVA	BYE	BYE	vs. #6 Clemson – **W, 63–62**	vs. #7 NC State – **W, 75–67**	vs. #1 Virginia - **L, 63–72**
4.	North Carolina^{†}	13-5	23-8	1-1 vs. DUKE	0-1 vs. UVA	BYE	BYE	vs. #5 Pittsburgh – **L, 75–80**		
5.	Pittsburgh^{#}	11-7	23-8			BYE	vs. #12 Wake Forest – **W, 84–55**	vs. #4 North Carolina – **W, 80–75**	vs. #1 Virginia – **L, 48–51**	
6.	Clemson^{#}	10-8	19-11			BYE	vs. #11 Georgia Tech – **W, 69–65^{OT}**	vs. #3 Duke – **L, 62–63**		
7.	N.C. State^{#}	9-9	19-12	2-0 vs. MD, FSU		BYE	vs. #10 Miami - **W, 67–58**	vs. #2 Syracuse - **W, 66–63**	vs. #3 Duke - **l, 67–75**	
8.	Maryland^{#}	9-9	17-14	1-1 vs. FSU (0-1 vs. NCST)	1-1 vs. UVA	BYE	vs. #9 Florida State - **L, 65–67**			
9.	Florida State^{#}	9-9	18-12	1-1 vs. MD (0-1 vs. NCST)	0-2 vs. UVA	BYE	vs. #8 Maryland - **W, 67–65**	vs. #1 Virginia – **L, 51–64**		
10.	Miami (FL)	7-11	16-15			vs. #15 Virginia Tech - **W, 57–53**	vs. #7 NC State - **L, 57–68**			
11.	Georgia Tech	6-12	15-16	2-1 vs. WF, ND		vs. #14 Boston College - **W, 73-70^{OT}**	vs. #6 Clemson – **L, 65–69^{OT}**			
12.	Wake Forest	6-12	16-15	1-1 vs. GT, ND		vs. #13 Notre Dame - **W, 81–69**	vs. #5 Pittsburgh - **L, 55–84**			
13.	Notre Dame	6-12	15-16	1-2 vs. GT, WF		vs. #12 Wake Forest - **L, 69–81**				
14.	Boston College	4-14	8-23			vs. #11 Georgia Tech - **L, 70-73^{OT}**				
15.	Virginia Tech	2-16	9-21			vs. #10 Miami - **L, 53–57**				
‡ – ACC regular season champions, and tournament No. 1 seed. † – Received a double-bye in the conference tournament. # – Received a single-bye in the conference tournament. Overall records include all games played in the ACC tournament.

=== NCAA tournament ===
Seed	Region	School	First Four	Second Round	Third Round	Sweet 16	Elite Eight	Final Four	Championship
1	East	Virginia		#16 Coastal Carolina **W, 70–59**	#8 Memphis **W, 78–60**	#4 Michigan State **L, 59-61**			
3	Midwest	Duke		#14 Mercer **L, 71–78**					
3	South	Syracuse		#14 Western Michigan **W, 77–53**	#11 Dayton **L, 53–55**				
6	East	North Carolina		#11 Providence **W, 79–77**	#3 Iowa State **L, 83-85**				
9	South	Pittsburgh		#8 Colorado **W, 77–48**	#1 Florida **L, 45-61**				
12	Midwest	NC State	#12 Xavier **W, 74–59**	#5 St. Louis **L, 83-85^{OT}**					
