= 2013–14 Virginia Tech Hokies men's basketball team =

American college basketball season

2013–14 Virginia Tech Hokies men's basketball
- Conference: Atlantic Coast Conference
- Record: 9–22 (2–16 ACC)
- Head coach: James Johnson (2nd season)
- Assistant coaches: Kurt Kanaskie; Andrew Moore; Ramon Williams
- Home arena: Cassell Coliseum

2013–14 ACC men's basketball standings
	Conf.				Overall
Team	W		L	PCT	W		L	PCT
No. 3 Virginia †	16	–	2	.889	30	–	7	.811
No. 14 Syracuse	14	–	4	.778	28	–	6	.824
No. 8 Duke	13	–	5	.722	26	–	9	.743
No. 19 North Carolina	13	–	5	.722	24	–	10	.706
Pittsburgh	11	–	7	.611	26	–	10	.722
Clemson	10	–	8	.556	23	–	13	.639
NC State	9	–	9	.500	22	–	14	.611
Maryland	9	–	9	.500	17	–	15	.531
Florida State	9	–	9	.500	22	–	14	.611
Miami (FL)	7	–	11	.389	17	–	16	.515
Wake Forest	6	–	12	.333	17	–	16	.515
Georgia Tech	6	–	12	.333	16	–	17	.485
Notre Dame	6	–	12	.333	15	–	17	.469
Boston College	4	–	14	.222	8	–	24	.250
Virginia Tech	2	–	16	.111	9	–	22	.290
† 2014 ACC tournament winner Rankings from AP poll

The 2013–14 Virginia Tech Hokies men's basketball team represented Virginia Polytechnic Institute and State University during the 2013–14 NCAA Division I men's basketball season. They were led by second year head coach James Johnson and played their home games at Cassell Coliseum. They were a member of the Atlantic Coast Conference. They finished the season 9–22, 2–16 in ACC play to finish in last place. They lost in the first round of the ACC tournament to Miami (FL).

On March 17, head coach James Johnson was fired. He compiled a record of 22–41 in two seasons. On March 21, he was replaced by Buzz Williams, most recently the head coach at Marquette.

== Recruiting class ==
College recruiting information
Name	Hometown	School	Height	Weight	Commit date
Ben Emelogu; SG	Grand Prairie, TX	South Grand Prairie	6 ft 5 in (1.96 m)	190 lb (86 kg)	Oct 13, 2012
Ben Emelogu; SG	Recruit ratings: Scout: Rivals: (70)				
Maurice Kirby; C	Chandler, AZ	Basha	6 ft 9 in (2.06 m)	230 lb (100 kg)	Oct 11, 2012
Maurice Kirby; C	Recruit ratings: Scout: Rivals: (67)				
Malik Müller; PG	Germany	Urspring	6 ft 3 in (1.91 m)	228 lb (103 kg)	Feb 14, 2013
Malik Müller; PG	Recruit ratings: Scout: Rivals: (NA)				
Trevor Thompson; C	Indianapolis, IN	St. Johns NW Military Academy	6 ft 9 in (2.06 m)	205 lb (93 kg)	Sep 4, 2012
Trevor Thompson; C	Recruit ratings: Scout: Rivals: (NA)				
Devin Wilson; SG	McKees Rocks, PA	Montour	6 ft 4 in (1.93 m)	185 lb (84 kg)	Apr 15, 2013
Devin Wilson; SG	Recruit ratings: Scout: Rivals: (64)				
Overall recruit ranking: Scout: NA Rivals: NA ESPN: NA
Note: In many cases, Scout, Rivals, 247Sports, On3, and ESPN may conflict in their listings of height and weight.; In these cases, the average was taken. ESPN grades are on a 100-point scale.; Sources: "Virginia Tech Commit List for 2013". Rivals.; "ESPN". ESPN.; "2013 Team Ranking". Rivals.

== Roster ==
2013–14 Virginia Tech Hokies men's basketball team
Players
Coaches

Pos.	#	Name	Height	Weight	Year	Previous school	Hometown
G	1	Malik Müller	6 ft 3 in (1.91 m)	210 lb (95 kg)	Fr	Urspring	Ehingen, Germany
F	2	Joey van Zegeren	6 ft 10 in (2.08 m)	225 lb (102 kg)	RS So	Canarias Basketball Academy	Hoogeveen, Netherlands
G	3	Adam Smith	6 ft 1 in (1.85 m)	170 lb (77 kg)	RS So	Fayette County / UNC Wilmington	Jonesboro, Georgia
F	4	Cadarian Raines	6 ft 9 in (2.06 m)	238 lb (108 kg)	RS Sr	Petersburg	Petersburg, Virginia
G	10	Marquis Rankin	6 ft 1 in (1.85 m)	185 lb (84 kg)	Jr	Hargrave Military Academy	Charlotte, North Carolina
G	11	Devin Wilson	6 ft 4 in (1.93 m)	185 lb (84 kg)	RS Fr	Montour	McKees Rocks, Pennsylvania
F	14	Greg Donlon (W)	6 ft 8 in (2.03 m)	230 lb (104 kg)	So	Cosby	Midlothian, Virginia
G	15	Ben Emelogu	6 ft 5 in (1.96 m)	205 lb (93 kg)	Fr	South Grand Prairie	Grand Prairie, Texas
F	21	Maurice Kirby	6 ft 9 in (2.06 m)	235 lb (107 kg)	Fr	Basha	Chandler, Arizona
F	22	Christian Beyer	6 ft 7 in (2.01 m)	200 lb (91 kg)	Jr	New Bern	New Bern, North Carolina
G	25	Will Johnston	6 ft 4 in (1.93 m)	205 lb (93 kg)	Jr	Midlothian	Midlothian, Virginia
F	31	Jarell Eddie	6 ft 7 in (2.01 m)	220 lb (100 kg)	Sr	Cannon School	Charlotte, North Carolina
F	32	Trevor Thompson	6 ft 11 in (2.11 m)	210 lb (95 kg)	Fr	St. John's Northwestern Military Academy	Indianapolis, Indiana
F	33	Marshall Wood	6 ft 8 in (2.03 m)	230 lb (104 kg)	So	Rustburg	Rustburg, Virginia
F	42	C. J. Barksdale	6 ft 8 in (2.03 m)	235 lb (107 kg)	Jr	Hargrave Military Academy	Danville, Virginia

Head coach

- James Johnson

Assistant coach(es)

- Kurt Kanaskie
- Ramon Williams
- Andrew Moore

Legend

- (C) Team captain
- (S) Suspended
- (I) Ineligible
- (W) Walk-on
- Injured
- Current redshirt

Roster
Last update: November 18, 2013

== Schedule ==
Date time, TV	Opponent	Result	Record	Site (attendance) city, state
Regular season
11/09/2013*; 12:00 pm, ESPN3	USC Upstate; Coaches vs. Cancer Classic	L 63–64	0–1	Cassell Coliseum (5,321); Blacksburg, VA
11/12/2013*; 1:00 pm, ESPN	West Virginia	W 87–82	1–1	Cassell Coliseum (5,049); Blacksburg, VA
11/17/2013*; 7:00 pm, ESPN3	Western Carolina; Coaches vs. Cancer Classic	W 79–61	2–1	Cassell Coliseum (5,617); Blacksburg, VA
11/18/2013*; 7:00 pm, ESPN3	VMI	W 105–92	3–1	Cassel Coliseum (4,162); Blacksburg, VA
11/22/2013*; 9:30 pm, truTV	vs. No. 1 Michigan State; Coaches vs. Cancer semifinals	L 77–96	3–2	Barclays Center (6,115); Brooklyn, NY
11/23/2013*; 7:10 pm, truTV	vs. Seton Hall; Coaches vs. Cancer, 3rd place game	L 67–68	3–3	Barclays Center (6,098); Brooklyn, NY
11/26/2013*; 7:00 pm, ESPN3	Furman	W 75–54	4–3	Cassell Coliseum (3,470); Blacksburg, VA
11/29/2013*; 2:00 pm, ESPN3	Radford; New River Valley rivalry	W 81–56	5–3	Cassell Coliseum (5,217); Blacksburg, VA
12/03/2013*; 7:00 pm, ESPN3	Winthrop	W 81–63	6–3	Cassell Coliseum (3,888); Blacksburg, VA
12/08/2013; 12:30 pm, ESPNU	at Miami (FL)	W 61–60 ^{OT}	7–3 (1–0)	BankUnited Center (6,270); Coral Gables, FL
12/21/2013*; 5:30 pm, NBCSN	vs. VCU; Governor’s Holiday Hoops Classic	L 52–82	7–4	Richmond Coliseum (10,605); Richmond, VA
12/28/2013*; 12:00 pm, ESPN3	UNC Greensboro	L 52–55	7–5	Cassell Coliseum (4,847); Blacksburg, VA
12/31/2013*; 4:00 pm, ESPN3	UMES	W 82–66	8–5	Cassell Coliseum (4,179); Blacksburg, VA
01/07/2014; 9:00 pm, ACCN	No. 2 Syracuse	L 52–72	8–6 (1–1)	Cassell Coliseum (4,367); Blacksburg, VA
01/11/2014; 12:00 pm, RSN	Boston College	L 59–62	8–7 (1–2)	Cassell Coliseum (3,972); Blacksburg, VA
01/15/2014; 7:00 pm, RSN	Clemson	L 49–56	8–8 (1–3)	Cassell Coliseum (4,022); Blacksburg, VA
01/19/2014; 6:00 pm, ESPNU	at Notre Dame	L 63–70	8–9 (1–4)	Edmund P. Joyce Center (8,849); South Bend, IN
01/22/2014; 7:00 pm, RSN	Wake Forest	L 77–83	8–10 (1–5)	Cassell Coliseum (51,56); Blacksburg, VA
01/25/2014; 3:00 pm, ACCN	at Virginia	L 45–65	8–11 (1–6)	John Paul Jones Arena (14,215); Charlottesville, VA
01/29/2014; 7:00 pm, RSN	at Boston College	L 52–76	8–12 (1–7)	Conte Forum (2,964); Chestnut Hill, MA
02/01/2014; 12:00 pm, ACCN	Maryland	L 60–80	8–13 (1–8)	Cassell Coliseum (5,110); Blacksburg, VA
02/05/2014; 9:00 pm, RSN	at Florida State	L 50–70	8–14 (1–9)	Donald L. Tucker Center (5,759); Tallahassee, FL
02/08/2014; 12:00 pm, RSN	at No. 25 Pittsburgh	L 57–62 ^{2OT}	8–15 (1–10)	Petersen Events Center (12,508); Pittsburgh, PA
02/15/2014; 6:00 pm, RSN	Miami (FL)	W 53–45	9–15 (2–10)	Cassell Coliseum (5,105); Blacksburg, VA
02/18/2014; 9:00 pm, ACCN	No. #14 Virginia	L 53–57	9–16 (2–11)	Cassell Coliseum (5,316); Blacksburgh, VA
02/22/2014; 2:00 pm, RSN	NC State	L 64–71	9–17 (2–12)	Cassell Coliseum (5,268); Blacksburg, VA
02/25/2014; 7:00 pm, ESPNU	at No. 6 Duke	L 48–66	9–18 (2–13)	Cameron Indoor Stadium (9,314); Durham, NC
03/01/2014; 2:30 pm, ACCN	No. 19 North Carolina	L 56–60	9–19 (2–14)	Cassell Coliseum (6,546); Blacksburg, VA
03/04/2014; 8:00 pm, ACCN	at Maryland	L 47–64	9–20 (2–15)	Comcast Center (10,517); College Park, MD
03/08/2014; 2:00 pm, ESPN2	at Georgia Tech	L 51–62	9–21 (2–16)	Hank McCamish Pavilion (8,155); Atlanta, GA
ACC tournament
03/12/2014; 3:30 pm, ESPNU/ACC Network	vs. Miami (FL); First round	L 53–57	9–22	Greensboro Coliseum (10,945); Greensboro, NC
*Non-conference game. ^{#}Rankings from AP Poll. (#) Tournament seedings in parentheses. All times are in Eastern Time.
