= 2013–14 Wake Forest Demon Deacons men's basketball team =

American college basketball season

2013–14 Wake Forest Demon Deacons men's basketball
- Conference: Atlantic Coast Conference
- Record: 17–16 (6–12 ACC)
- Head coach: Jeff Bzdelik (4th season)
- Assistant coaches: Jeff Battle; Randolph Childress; Rusty LaRue
- Home arena: LJVM Coliseum

2013–14 ACC men's basketball standings
	Conf.				Overall
Team	W		L	PCT	W		L	PCT
No. 3 Virginia †	16	–	2	.889	30	–	7	.811
No. 14 Syracuse	14	–	4	.778	28	–	6	.824
No. 8 Duke	13	–	5	.722	26	–	9	.743
No. 19 North Carolina	13	–	5	.722	24	–	10	.706
Pittsburgh	11	–	7	.611	26	–	10	.722
Clemson	10	–	8	.556	23	–	13	.639
NC State	9	–	9	.500	22	–	14	.611
Maryland	9	–	9	.500	17	–	15	.531
Florida State	9	–	9	.500	22	–	14	.611
Miami (FL)	7	–	11	.389	17	–	16	.515
Wake Forest	6	–	12	.333	17	–	16	.515
Georgia Tech	6	–	12	.333	16	–	17	.485
Notre Dame	6	–	12	.333	15	–	17	.469
Boston College	4	–	14	.222	8	–	24	.250
Virginia Tech	2	–	16	.111	9	–	22	.290
† 2014 ACC tournament winner Rankings from AP poll

The 2013–14 Wake Forest Demon Deacons men's basketball team represented Wake Forest University during the 2013–14 NCAA Division I men's basketball season. Their head coach was Jeff Bzdelik, who was in his fourth season at Wake Forest. The team played its home games at the Lawrence Joel Veterans Memorial Coliseum in Winston-Salem, North Carolina, and was a member of the Atlantic Coast Conference. They finished the season 17–16, 6–12 in ACC play to finish in three-way tie for 11th place. They advanced to the second round of the ACC tournament where they lost to Pittsburgh.

== Previous season ==
Wake finished the 2012–13 season 13–18, 6–12 in ACC play tied for 9th place and lost in the first round of the ACC tournament.

== Recruiting ==
Wake Forest has a 2-man recruiting class for 2013.

College recruiting
Name	Hometown	School	Height	Weight	Commit date
Greg McClinton; Forward	Chatham, Virginia	Hargrave Military Academy	6 ft 6 in (1.98 m)	165 lb (75 kg)	Jun 18, 2012
Greg McClinton; Forward	Recruit ratings: Scout: Rivals: (79)				
Miles Overton; Guard	Philadelphia, Pennsylvania	St. Joseph's Prep School	6 ft 2 in (1.88 m)	175 lb (79 kg)	Sep 23, 2012
Miles Overton; Guard	Recruit ratings: Scout: Rivals: (74)				
Overall recruit ranking:
Note: In many cases, Scout, Rivals, 247Sports, On3, and ESPN may conflict in their listings of height and weight.; In these cases, the average was taken. ESPN grades are on a 100-point scale.; Sources: "2013 Team Ranking". Rivals.

== Roster ==
2013–14 Wake Forest Demon Deacons men's basketball team
Players
Coaches

Pos.	#	Name	Height	Weight	Year	Previous school	Hometown
G	0	Codi Miller-McIntyre	6 ft 3 in (1.91 m)	195 lb (88 kg)	So	Hargrave Military Acad.	Concord, NC
G	1	Madison Jones	6 ft 1 in (1.85 m)	160 lb (73 kg)	So	Ravencroft School	Raleigh, NC
F	2	Devin Thomas	6 ft 9 in (2.06 m)	240 lb (109 kg)	So	Central Dauphin HS	Harrisburg, PA
F	4	Daniel Green	6 ft 10 in (2.08 m)	220 lb (100 kg)	RS So	Grapevine HS	Colleyville, TX
G	11	Greg McClinton	6 ft 7 in (2.01 m)	185 lb (84 kg)	Fr	Hargrave Military Acad.	Winston-Salem, NC
G	13	Coron Williams	6 ft 1 in (1.85 m)	175 lb (79 kg)	GS	Christchurch School	Midlothian, VA
G	20	Miles Overton	6 ft 4 in (1.93 m)	210 lb (95 kg)	Fr	St. Joseph's Prep School	Philadelphia, PA
F	30	Travis McKie	6 ft 7 in (2.01 m)	220 lb (100 kg)	Sr	John Marshall HS	Richmond, VA
C	31	Andre Washington	7 ft 0 in (2.13 m)	220 lb (100 kg)	So	Hargrave Military Acad.	Roanoke, VA
F	33	Aaron Rountree III	6 ft 8 in (2.03 m)	190 lb (86 kg)	So	Greenfield School	Wilson, NC
F	34	Tyler Cavanaugh	6 ft 9 in (2.06 m)	230 lb (104 kg)	So	Jamesville-Dewitt HS	Dewitt, NY
G	35	Stephen Prendergast	6 ft 1 in (1.85 m)	175 lb (79 kg)	So	Don Bosco Prep	Mahwah, NJ
G	41	Duke Antonelli	6 ft 3 in (1.91 m)	200 lb (91 kg)	So	Red Land HS	Mechanicsburg, PA
G	43	Trent VanHorn	6 ft 3 in (1.91 m)	200 lb (91 kg)	Fr	Canterbury School	Fort Wayne, IN
F	45	Arnaud William Adala Moto	6 ft 6 in (1.98 m)	225 lb (102 kg)	So	Episcopal HS	Yaoundé, Cameroon
F	51	Grant O'Brien	6 ft 7 in (2.01 m)	195 lb (88 kg)	So	The Governor's Academy	North Andover, MA
F	52	Doug Niedrich	6 ft 6 in (1.98 m)	200 lb (91 kg)	Jr	Adlai E. Stevenson HS	Kildeer, IL

Head coach

- Jeff Bzdelik (Illinois-Chicago)

Assistant coach(es)

- Jeff Battle (Marshall)
- Randolph Childress (Wake Forest)
- Rusty LaRue (Wake Forest)

Legend

- (C) Team captain
- (S) Suspended
- (I) Ineligible
- (W) Walk-on
- Injured
- Current redshirt

Roster
Last update: 2013-11-15

== Schedule ==
Date time, TV	Opponent	Result	Record	Site city, state
Exhibition
November 1*; 7:00 p.m., WFsports.com	Brevard	W 93–66		LJVM Coliseum; Winston-Salem, North Carolina
Regular season
November 8*; 7:00 p.m., ESPN3	Colgate	W 89–78	1–0	LJVM Coliseum; Winston-Salem, North Carolina
November 12*; 7:00 p.m., ESPN3	VMI	W 98–71	2–0	LJVM Coliseum; Winston-Salem, North Carolina
November 15*; 7:00 p.m., ESPN3	Presbyterian	W 69–48	3–0	LJVM Coliseum; Winston-Salem, North Carolina
November 18*; 7:00 p.m., ESPN3	Jacksonville	W 90–83	4–0	LJVM Coliseum; Winston-Salem, North Carolina
November 21*; 7:00 p.m., ESPN3	The Citadel; Battle 4 Atlantis	W 82–54	5–0	LJVM Coliseum; Winston-Salem, North Carolina
November 28*; 3:30 p.m., AXS TV	vs. No. 2 Kansas; Battle 4 Atlantis first round	L 78–87	5–1	Imperial Arena; Paradise Island, Bahamas
November 29*; 3:30 p.m., AXS TV	vs. USC; Battle 4 Atlantis consolation	W 77–63	6–1	Imperial Arena; Paradise Island, Bahamas
November 30*; 3:30 p.m., AXS TV	vs. Tennessee; Battle 4 Atlantis 5th place game	L 63–82	6–2	Imperial Arena; Paradise Island, Bahamas
December 4*; 7:00 p.m., ESPN3	Tulane	W 72–57	7–2	LJVM Coliseum; Winston-Salem, North Carolina
December 7*; 2:00 p.m., ESPN3	Richmond	W 76–66 ^{OT}	8–2	LJVM Coliseum; Winston-Salem, North Carolina
December 17*; 7:00 p.m., ESPN3	St. Bonaventure	W 77–62	9–2	LJVM Coliseum; Winston-Salem, North Carolina
December 21*; 2:00 p.m., ESPN3	UNC Greensboro	W 59–51	10–2	LJVM Coliseum; Winston-Salem, North Carolina
December 28*; 5:30 p.m., Fox Sports 1	at Xavier	L 53–68	10–3	Cintas Center; Cincinnati, Ohio
January 5; 8:00 p.m., ESPNU	No. 19 North Carolina	W 73–67	11–3 (1–0)	LJVM Coliseum; Winston-Salem, North Carolina
January 8; 7:00 p.m., RSN	at Virginia	L 54–71	11–4 (1–1)	John Paul Jones Arena; Charlottesville, Virginia
January 11; 12:00 p.m., ACC Network	at Pittsburgh	L 65–80	11–5 (1–2)	Petersen Events Center; Pittsburgh, Pennsylvania
January 15; 9:00 p.m., ACC Network	NC State	W 70–69	12–5 (2–2)	LJVM Coliseum; Winston-Salem, North Carolina
January 18; 4:00 p.m., ACC Network	at Clemson	L 53–61	12–6 (2–3)	Littlejohn Coliseum; Clemson, South Carolina
January 22; 4:00 p.m., RSN	at Virginia Tech	W 83–77	13–6 (3–3)	Cassell Coliseum; Blacksburg, Virginia
January 25; 3:00 p.m., ACC Network	Notre Dame	W 65–58	14–6 (4–3)	LJVM Coliseum; Winston-Salem, North Carolina
January 29; 9:00 p.m., RSN	No. 2 Syracuse	L 57–67	14–7 (4–4)	LJVM Coliseum; Winston-Salem, North Carolina
February 1; 12:00 p.m., RSN	Georgia Tech	L 70–79	14–8 (4–5)	LJVM Coliseum; Winston-Salem, North Carolina
February 4; 9:00 p.m., ESPNU	at No. 11 Duke	L 63–83	14–9 (4–6)	Cameron Indoor Stadium; Durham, North Carolina
February 11; 7:00 p.m., ESPNU	at NC State	L 67–82	14–10 (4–7)	PNC Arena; Raleigh, North Carolina
February 15; 8:00 p.m., RSN	Florida State	L 60–67	14–11 (4–8)	LJVM Coliseum; Winston-Salem, North Carolina
February 18; 7:00 p.m., RSN	at Maryland	L 60–70	14–12 (4–9)	Comcast Center; College Park, Maryland
February 22; 12:00 p.m., ACC Network	at North Carolina	L 72–105	14–13 (4–10)	Dean Smith Center; Chapel Hill, North Carolina
February 25; 7:00 p.m., RSN	Clemson	W 62–57	15–13 (5–10)	LJVM Coliseum; Winston-Salem, North Carolina
March 1; 4:00 p.m., RSN	Boston College	L 72–80	15–14 (5–11)	LJVM Coliseum; Winston-Salem, North Carolina
March 5; 7:00 p.m., ESPN2	No. 4 Duke	W 82–72	16–14 (6–11)	LJVM Coliseum; Winston-Salem, North Carolina
March 8; 2:00 p.m., RSN	at Miami (FL)	L 56–69	16–15 (6–12)	BankUnited Center; Coral Gables, Florida
ACC tournament
March 12; 1:00 p.m., ESPNU/ACC Network	vs. Notre Dame; First round	W 81–69	17–15	Greensboro Coliseum; Greensboro, North Carolina
March 13; 2:00 p.m., ESPNU/ACC Network	vs. Pittsburgh; Second round	L 55–84	17–16	Greensboro Coliseum; Greensboro, North Carolina
*Non-conference game. ^{#}Rankings from Coaches' Poll. (#) Tournament seedings in parentheses. All times are in Eastern Time..

== Leaders by game ==
- Team Season Highs in **Bold**.

Game	Points	Rebounds	Assists	Steals	Blocks
Colgate	Thomas (23)	McKie/Miller-McIntyre (7)	Miller-McIntyre (4)	Jones (2)	Rountree III/Thomas (1)
VMI	Miller-McIntyre (23)	Thomas (17)	Jones (9)	Jones (1)	Thomas (2)
Presbyterian	Miller-McIntyre (20)	Thomas (11)	Overton (5)	Williams (2)	Washington (3)
Jacksonville	McKie (22)	Thomas (16)	Thomas (5)	McKie/Miller-McIntyre (2)	McKie (2)
The Citadel	Williams (12)	Thomas (8)	Miller-McIntyre (8)	**McKie (4)**	**McKie (5)**
Kansas	**Miller-McIntyre (26)**	Cavanaugh (8)	Jones/Miller-McIntyre (4)	5 tied (1)	Washington (2)
USC	Williams (15)	Thomas (8)	Miller-McIntyre/Thomas (4)	Jones (3)	3 tied (1)
Tennessee	Miller-McIntyre (17)	Adala Moto (5)	Jones/Miller-McIntyre (4)	3 tied (1)	3 tied (1)
Tulane	Williams (18)	Miller-McIntyre/Thomas (6)	Miller-McIntyre/Williams (4)	Rountree/Washington (1)	Washington (4)
Richmond	**Miller-McIntyre (26)**	**Thomas (19)**	Miller-McIntyre (4)	Thomas (2)	Washington (2)
St. Bonaventure	Miller-McIntyre (20)	Cavanaugh (8)	Jones (6)	McKie (2)	Thomas/Washington (3)
UNC Greensboro	Cavanaugh/Thomas (12)	Thomas (13)	Jones (2)	3 tied (2)	Washington (4)
Xavier	Miller-McIntyre (11)	Adala Moto (6)	Miller-McIntyre (4)	**Williams (4)**	**Washington (5)**
North Carolina	McKie (16)	Adala Moto/Thomas (9)	Miller-McIntyre/Thomas (4)	Rountree III (3)	Rountree III (4)
Virginia	Williams (11)	McKie (4)	Jones/Miller-McIntyre (3)	Cavanaugh/Miller-McIntyre (2)	Washington (2)
Pittsburgh	Thomas (17)	Thomas (9)	Miller-McIntyre (4)	Adala Moto (2)	Jones (2)
NC State	Miller-McIntyre (20)	Adala Moto (11)	Jones (7)	6 tied (1)	Cavanaugh (2)
Clemson	Williams (13)	Adala Moto/Thomas (6)	Miller-McIntyre (3)	3 tied (1)	Rountree III/Thomas (1)
Virginia Tech	McKie (24)	Thomas (9)	**Miller-McIntyre (10)**	Thomas (2)	Washington (3)
Notre Dame	Thomas (21)	Cavanaugh (7)	Jones (3)	McKie (1)	Thomas (2)
Syracuse	McKie/Thomas (12)	McKie/Williams (6)	Jones/Thomas (3)	Jones (2)	Adala Moto/Thomas (1)
Georgia Tech	**McKie (26)**	Thomas (9)	Thomas (4)	**Jones/McKie (4)**	McKie (2)
Duke	Thomas (14)	Adala Moto (10)	Jones/Thomas (3)	Jones (3)	
NC State	Miller-McIntyre (15)	Thomas (6)	Miller-McIntyre (7)	Adala Moto/Rountree III (2)	Washington (1)
Florida State	Williams (18)	Cavanaugh/McKie (7)	McKie (3)	3 tied (2)	4 tied (1)
Maryland	McKie (16)	Thomas (15)	Miller-McIntyre (6)	McKie/Miller-McIntyre (2)	Thomas (3)
North Carolina	Williams (19)	Thomas (5)	Miller-McIntyre/Rountree III (4)	4 tied (1)	Thomas (1)
Clemson	Cavanaugh/Thomas (12)	3 tied (5)	Miller-McIntyre (6)	Overton (2)	Cavanaugh/Rountree III (1)
Boston College	McKie/Thomas (18)	Cavanaugh (5)	Jones/Williams (3)	**McKie (4)**	Thomas (1)
Duke	Cavanaugh (20)	Thomas (8)	Miller-McIntyre (8)	Williams (3)	Thomas (2)
Miami	Williams (17)	Adala Moto/Williams (4)	Miller-McIntyre (6)	3 tied (2)	3 tied (1)
Notre Dame	Williams (25)	Thomas (10)	Miller-McIntyre (6)	3 tied (1)	Thomas (1)
Pittsburgh	Williams (16)	Thomas (6)	Miller-McIntyre (4)	3 tied (1)	Thomas/Washington (1)
