= 2013–14 Georgia Tech Yellow Jackets men's basketball team =

American college basketball season

2013–14 Georgia Tech Yellow Jackets men's basketball
- Conference: Atlantic Coast Conference
- Record: 16–17 (6–12 ACC)
- Head coach: Brian Gregory (3rd season)
- Assistant coaches: Billy Schmidt; Chad Dollar
- Home arena: McCamish Pavilion

2013–14 ACC men's basketball standings
| | Conf. | | | | Overall |
| Team | W | | L | PCT | W | | L | PCT |
|---|---|---|---|---|---|---|---|---|
| No. 3 Virginia † | 16 | – | 2 | .889 | 30 | – | 7 | .811 |
| No. 14 Syracuse | 14 | – | 4 | .778 | 28 | – | 6 | .824 |
| No. 8 Duke | 13 | – | 5 | .722 | 26 | – | 9 | .743 |
| No. 19 North Carolina | 13 | – | 5 | .722 | 24 | – | 10 | .706 |
| Pittsburgh | 11 | – | 7 | .611 | 26 | – | 10 | .722 |
| Clemson | 10 | – | 8 | .556 | 23 | – | 13 | .639 |
| NC State | 9 | – | 9 | .500 | 22 | – | 14 | .611 |
| Maryland | 9 | – | 9 | .500 | 17 | – | 15 | .531 |
| Florida State | 9 | – | 9 | .500 | 22 | – | 14 | .611 |
| Miami (FL) | 7 | – | 11 | .389 | 17 | – | 16 | .515 |
| Wake Forest | 6 | – | 12 | .333 | 17 | – | 16 | .515 |
| Georgia Tech | 6 | – | 12 | .333 | 16 | – | 17 | .485 |
| Notre Dame | 6 | – | 12 | .333 | 15 | – | 17 | .469 |
| Boston College | 4 | – | 14 | .222 | 8 | – | 24 | .250 |
| Virginia Tech | 2 | – | 16 | .111 | 9 | – | 22 | .290 |
† 2014 ACC tournament winner Rankings from AP poll

The 2013–14 Georgia Tech Yellow Jackets men's basketball team represented the Georgia Institute of Technology during the 2013–14 NCAA Division I men's basketball season. They are led by third year head coach Brian Gregory and played their home games at McCamish Pavilion. They were members of the Atlantic Coast Conference. They finished the season 16–17, 6–12 in ACC play to finish in a three-way tie for 11th place. They advanced to the second round of the ACC tournament where they lost to Clemson.

== Roster ==
2013–14 Georgia Tech Yellow Jackets men's basketball team
Players
Coaches

| Pos. | # | Name | Height | Weight | Year | Hometown |
|---|---|---|---|---|---|---|
| G | 1 | Stacey Poole, Jr. | 6 ft 4 in (1.93 m) | 199 lb (90 kg) | Jr | Jacksonville, Florida |
| G | 2 | Solomon Poole | 6 ft 0 in (1.83 m) | 190 lb (86 kg) | So | Jacksonville, Florida |
| G/F | 3 | Marcus Georges-Hunt | 6 ft 5 in (1.96 m) | 219 lb (99 kg) | So | College Park, Georgia |
| F | 4 | Robert Carter | 6 ft 8 in (2.03 m) | 247 lb (112 kg) | So | Thomasville, Georgia |
| C | 5 | Daniel Miller | 6 ft 11 in (2.11 m) | 275 lb (125 kg) | Sr | Loganville, Georgia |
| G | 10 | Travis Jorgenson (injured) | 6 ft 0 in (1.83 m) | 177 lb (80 kg) | Fr | Columbia, Missouri |
| G | 11 | Chris Bolden | 6 ft 3 in (1.91 m) | 216 lb (98 kg) | So | Tifton, Georgia |
| F | 12 | Quinton Stephens | 6 ft 8 in (2.03 m) | 184 lb (83 kg) | Fr | Atlanta, Georgia |
| G/F | 14 | Jason Morris | 6 ft 5 in (1.96 m) | 231 lb (105 kg) | Sr | Augusta, Georgia |
| G | 23 | Trae Golden | 6 ft 2 in (1.88 m) | 205 lb (93 kg) | Sr | Powder Springs, Georgia |
| F | 24 | Kammeon Holsey | 6 ft 8 in (2.03 m) | 234 lb (106 kg) | Sr | Sparta, Georgia |
| G | 30 | Corey Heyward | 6 ft 1 in (1.85 m) | 221 lb (100 kg) | So | Duluth, Georgia |
| G/F | 31 | Aaron Peak | 6 ft 4 in (1.93 m) | 188 lb (85 kg) | Jr | Atlanta, Georgia |
| G | 32 | Brooks Doyle | 6 ft 4 in (1.93 m) | 199 lb (90 kg) | So | Atlanta, Georgia |
| G | 41 | Collin Gurry | 6 ft 1 in (1.85 m) | 183 lb (83 kg) | So | Canton, Connecticut |
| F | 42 | Rand Rowland | 6 ft 6 in (1.98 m) | 208 lb (94 kg) | Fr | Cleveland, Georgia |
| G | 43 | Ron Wamer | 6 ft 2 in (1.88 m) | 190 lb (86 kg) | So | Dacula, Georgia |

Head coach

- Brian Gregory (Oakland)

Assistant coach(es)

- Billy Schmidt (Wake Forest)
- Chad Dollar (South Florida)

Legend

- (C) Team captain
- (S) Suspended
- (I) Ineligible
- (W) Walk-on
- Injured
- Current redshirt

Roster
Last update: 2013-11-27

== Schedule ==
| Date time, TV | Opponent | Result | Record | Site (attendance) city, state |
Exhibition
| 11/01/2013*; 8:00 pm | Young Harris | W 90–53 | – | McCamish Pavilion (1,734); Atlanta, GA |
Non-conference regular season
| 11/08/2013*; 7:30 pm, ESPN3 | Presbyterian | W 88–57 | 1–0 | McCamish Pavilion (6,798); Atlanta, GA |
| 11/11/2013*; 7:00 pm, ESPN3 | Delaware State | W 68–50 | 2–0 | McCamish Pavilion (5,390); Atlanta, GA |
| 11/15/2013*; 7:30 pm, FSN | at Georgia; Clean, Old-Fashioned Hate | W 80–71 | 3–0 | Stegeman Coliseum (10,523); Athens, GA |
| 11/20/2013*; 7:00 pm, ESPN3 | Dayton | L 72–82 | 3–1 | McCamish Pavilion (6,283); Atlanta, GA |
| 11/24/2013*; 2:00 pm, ESPN3 | North Carolina A&T; Barclays Center Classic | W 78–71 | 4–1 | McCamish Pavilion (5,639); Atlanta, GA |
| 11/26/2013*; 7:00 pm, ESPN3 | Mississippi Valley State; Barclays Center Classic | W 76–59 | 5–1 | McCamish Pavilion (5,336); Atlanta, GA |
| 11/29/2013*; 4:30 pm, NBCSN | vs. Ole Miss; Barclays Center Classic Semi-Finals | L 67–77 | 5–2 | Barclays Center (4,231); Brooklyn, NY |
| 11/30/2013*; 2:00 pm, NBCSN | vs. St. Johns; Barclays Center Classic 3rd Place | L 58–69 | 5–3 | Barclays Center (3,088); Brooklyn, NY |
| 12/03/2013*; 7:15 pm, ESPN2 | Illinois; ACC–Big Ten Challenge | W 67–64 | 6–3 | McCamish Pavilion (6,516); Atlanta, GA |
| 12/07/2013*; 2:00 pm, ESPN3 | East Tennessee State | W 87–57 | 7–3 | McCamish Pavilion (5,889); Atlanta, GA |
| 12/16/2013*; 7:00 pm, ESPN3 | Kennesaw State | W 74–57 | 8–3 | McCamish Pavilion (5,972); Atlanta, GA |
| 12/21/2013*; 4:00 pm, FSN | at Vanderbilt | L 63–76 | 8–4 | Memorial Gymnasium (9,022); Nashville, TN |
| 12/29/2013*; 7:00 pm, FS1 | at Charlotte | W 58–55 | 9–4 | Halton Arena (6,150); Charlotte, NC |
ACC regular season
| 01/04/2014; 2:00 pm, ACCN | at Maryland | L 61–77 | 9–5 (0–1) | Comcast Center (12,545); College Park, MD |
| 01/07/2014; 7:00 pm, ESPNU | at No. 16 Duke | L 57–79 | 9–6 (0–2) | Cameron Indoor Stadium (9,314); Durham, NC |
| 01/11/2014; 12:00 pm, ACCN | Notre Dame | W 74–69 | 10–6 (1–2) | McCamish Pavilion (7,727); Atlanta, GA |
| 01/14/2014; 9:00 pm, ESPNU | No. 22 Pittsburgh | L 74–81 | 10–7 (1–3) | McCamish Pavilion (7,131); Atlanta, GA |
| 01/18/2014; 2:00 pm, RSN | Miami (FL) | L 42–56 | 10–8 (1–4) | McCamish Pavilion (8,072); Atlanta, GA |
| 01/21/2014; 9:00 pm, ESPNU | at Boston College | W 68–60 | 11–8 (2–4) | Conte Forum (1,789); Chestnut Hill, MA |
| 01/26/2014; 1:00 pm, ACCN | at NC State | L 78–80 ^{OT} | 11–9 (2–5) | PNC Arena (14,120); Raleigh, NC |
| 01/29/2014; 7:00 pm, ESPN3 | North Carolina | L 65–78 | 11–10 (2–6) | McCamish Pavilion (5,124); Atlanta, GA |
| 02/01/2014; 12:00 pm, RSN | at Wake Forest | W 79–70 | 12–10 (3–6) | LJVM Coliseum (10,288); Winston-Salem, NC |
| 02/04/2014; 8:00 pm, ACCN | at Clemson | L 41–45 | 12–11 (3–7) | Littlejohn Coliseum (7,248); Clemson, SC |
| 02/08/2014; 12:00 pm, ACCN | No. 20 Virginia | L 45–64 | 12–12 (3–8) | McCamish Pavilion (8,187); Atlanta, GA |
| 02/13/2014; 5:00 pm, RSN | Boston College | W 74–71 | 13–12 (4–8) | McCamish Pavilion (4,765); Atlanta, GA |
| 02/18/2014; 9:00 pm, ACCN | No. 8 Duke | L 51–68 | 13–13 (4–9) | McCamish Pavilion (8,600); Atlanta, GA |
| 02/22/2014; 12:00 pm, RSN | Clemson | L 55–63 | 13–14 (4–10) | McCamish Pavilion (8,003); Atlanta, GA |
| 02/26/2014; 7:00 pm, ESPN2 | at Notre Dame | L 62–65 | 13–15 (4–11) | Joyce Center (8,127); South Bend, IN |
| 03/02/2014; 6:00 pm, ESPNU | at Florida State | L 71–81 | 13–16 (4–12) | Donald L. Tucker Center (6,212); Tallahassee, FL |
| 03/04/2014; 7:00 pm, RSN | at No. 7 Syracuse | W 67–62 | 14–16 (5–12) | Carrier Dome (26,766); Syracuse, NY |
| 03/08/2014; 2:00 pm, ESPN2 | Virginia Tech | W 62–51 | 15–16 (6–12) | McCamish Pavilion (8,155); Atlanta, GA |
ACC tournament
| 03/12/2014; 7:00 pm, ESPN2 | vs. Boston College; First round | W 73-70 ^{OT} | 16–16 | Greensboro Coliseum (10,945); Greensboro, NC |
| 03/13/2014; 9:00 pm, ESPN | vs. Clemson; Second round | L 65–69 ^{OT} | 16–17 | Greensboro Coliseum (21,533); Greensboro, NC |
*Non-conference game. ^{#}Rankings from AP Poll. (#) Tournament seedings in parentheses. All times are in Eastern Time.
