= 2014 ACC men's basketball tournament =

- 2014 ACC Tournament logo
- Classification: Division I
- Season: 2013–14
- Teams: 15
- Site: Greensboro Coliseum; Greensboro, North Carolina
- Champions: Virginia (2nd title)
- Winning coach: Tony Bennett (1st title)
- MVP: Joe Harris (Virginia)
- Television: ESPN, ACCN

2013–14 ACC men's basketball standings
	Conf.				Overall
Team	W		L	PCT	W		L	PCT
No. 3 Virginia †	16	–	2	.889	30	–	7	.811
No. 14 Syracuse	14	–	4	.778	28	–	6	.824
No. 8 Duke	13	–	5	.722	26	–	9	.743
No. 19 North Carolina	13	–	5	.722	24	–	10	.706
Pittsburgh	11	–	7	.611	26	–	10	.722
Clemson	10	–	8	.556	23	–	13	.639
NC State	9	–	9	.500	22	–	14	.611
Maryland	9	–	9	.500	17	–	15	.531
Florida State	9	–	9	.500	22	–	14	.611
Miami (FL)	7	–	11	.389	17	–	16	.515
Wake Forest	6	–	12	.333	17	–	16	.515
Georgia Tech	6	–	12	.333	16	–	17	.485
Notre Dame	6	–	12	.333	15	–	17	.469
Boston College	4	–	14	.222	8	–	24	.250
Virginia Tech	2	–	16	.111	9	–	22	.290
† 2014 ACC tournament winner Rankings from AP poll

The 2014 Atlantic Coast Conference men's basketball tournament was the postseason men's basketball tournament for the Atlantic Coast Conference held from March 12 to 16 in Greensboro, North Carolina, at the Greensboro Coliseum. This was the first ACC Tournament to include 15 teams, a result of the conference adding Syracuse, Pitt, and Notre Dame, and also the last to feature Maryland, which left after the season for the Big Ten Conference. Seeds #5 through #9 received a first-round bye, and the top four seeds received a first- and second-round "double bye".

Top-seeded Virginia won the tournament under the guidance of Tony Bennett, defeating Florida State, Pittsburgh, and then Duke in the championship game. It was their second ACC tournament championship and first since 1976. Virginia had lost its most recent five appearances in the tournament championship game, losing to North Carolina in 1977, 1982, and 1994, to NC State in 1983, and to Georgia Tech in 1990. The Cavaliers placed four players on the all-tournament teams, and their leading scorer, Joe Harris, was named tournament MVP.

== Seeds ==
Seed	School	Conference	Tiebreakers
1	Virginia^{†‡}	16–2	
2	Syracuse^{†}	14–4	
3	Duke^{†}	13–5	1–1 vs North Carolina; 1–0 vs Virginia
4	North Carolina^{†}	13–5	1–1 vs Duke; 0–1 vs Virginia
5	Pittsburgh^{#}	11–7	
6	Clemson^{#}	10–8	
7	NC State^{#}	9–9	2–0 vs Maryland & Florida St
8	Maryland^{#}	9–9	1–2 vs NC State & Florida St; 1–1 vs Virginia
9	Florida State^{#}	9–9	1–2 vs NC State & Maryland; 0–2 vs Virginia
10	Miami	7–11	
11	Georgia Tech	6–12	2–1 vs Wake Forest & Notre Dame
12	Wake Forest	6–12	1–1 vs Georgia Tech & Notre Dame
13	Notre Dame	6–12	1–2 vs Georgia Tech & Wake Forest
14	Boston College	4–14	
15	Virginia Tech	2–16	
‡ – ACC regular season champions, and tournament No. 1 seed. † – Received a first and second-round bye in the conference tournament. # – Received a first-round bye in the conference tournament. Overall records include all games played in the ACC Tournament.

== Schedule ==
Session	Game	Time*	Matchup^{#}	Television	Attendance
First round – Wednesday, March 12
Opening day	1	1 pm	#12 Wake Forest vs #13 Notre Dame	ESPN2; ACC Network	10,945
Opening day	2	3 pm	#10 Miami vs #15 Virginia Tech	ESPN2; ACC Network	10,945
Opening day	3	7 pm	#11 Georgia Tech vs #14 Boston College	ESPN2; ACC Network	10,945
Second round – Thursday, March 13
1	4	noon	#8 Maryland vs #9 Florida State	ESPN; ACC Network	21,533
1	5	2 pm	#5 Pittsburgh vs #12 Wake Forest	ESPN; ACC Network	21,533
2	6	7 pm	#7 NC State vs #10 Miami	ESPN; ACC Network	21,533
2	7	9 pm	#6 Clemson vs #11 Georgia Tech	ESPN; ACC Network	21,533
Quarterfinals – Friday, March 14
3	8	noon	#1 Virginia vs #9 Florida State	ESPN2; ACC Network	21,533
3	9	2 pm	#4 North Carolina vs #5 Pittsburgh	ESPN2; ACC Network	21,533
4	10	7 pm	#2 Syracuse vs #7 NC State	ESPN; ACC Network	21,533
4	11	9 pm	#3 Duke vs #6 Clemson	ESPN; ACC Network	21,533
Semifinals – Saturday, March 15
5	12	1 pm	#1 Virginia vs #5 Pittsburgh	ESPN; ACC Network	21,533
5	13	3 pm	#7 NC State vs #3 Duke	ESPN; ACC Network	21,533
Championship – Sunday, March 16
6	14	1 pm	#1 Virginia vs #3 Duke	ESPN/ACCN	21,533
*Game times in ET. #-Rankings denote tournament seed

== Bracket ==
First round Wednesday, March 12; ESPN2/ACCN
12	Wake Forest	81
13	Notre Dame	69
10	Miami	57
15	Virginia Tech	53
11	Georgia Tech	73^{OT}
14	Boston College	70

Second round Thursday, March 13; ESPN/ACCN
8	Maryland	65
9	Florida State	67
5	Pittsburgh	84
12	Wake Forest	55
7	NC State	67
10	Miami	58
6	Clemson	69^{OT}
11	Georgia Tech	65

Quarterfinals; Friday, March 14; ESPN/ACCN
1	#6 Virginia	64
9	Florida State	51
4	#15 North Carolina	75
5	Pittsburgh	80
2	#11 Syracuse	63
7	NC State	66
3	#7 Duke	63
6	Clemson	62

Semifinals; Saturday, March 15; ESPN/ACCN
1	#6 Virginia	51
5	Pittsburgh	48
7	NC State	67
3	#7 Duke	75

Championship; Sunday, March 16; ESPN/ACCN
1	#6 Virginia	72
3	#7 Duke	63

AP Rankings at time of tournament

== Awards and honors ==
Tournament MVP: Joe Harris, Virginia

All-Tournament Teams:

First Team
- Joe Harris, Virginia
- Malcolm Brogdon, Virginia
- Jabari Parker, Duke
- T. J. Warren, NC State
- Talib Zanna, Pitt

Second Team

- Anthony Gill, Virginia
- Akil Mitchell, Virginia
- Rodney Hood, Duke
- Amile Jefferson, Duke
- Lamar Patterson, Pitt

== See also ==
- 2014 ACC women's basketball tournament
