= 2013–14 North Carolina A&T Aggies men's basketball team =

American college basketball season

2013–14 North Carolina A&T Aggies men's basketball
- Conference: Mid-Eastern Athletic Conference
- Record: 9–23 (5–11 MEAC)
- Head coach: Cy Alexander (2nd season)
- Assistant coaches: Jay Joyner; Darren Corbett; Odell Witherspoon III
- Home arena: Corbett Sports Center

2013–14 MEAC men's basketball standings
	Conf.				Overall
Team	W		L	PCT	W		L	PCT
North Carolina Central †	15	–	1	.938	28	–	6	.824
Hampton	13	–	3	.813	18	–	13	.581
Norfolk State	11	–	5	.688	19	–	15	.559
Morgan State	11	–	5	.688	15	–	16	.484
Savannah State	10	–	6	.625	13	–	19	.406
Florida A&M	8	–	8	.500	14	–	18	.438
Coppin State	7	–	9	.438	12	–	20	.375
Delaware State	5	–	11	.313	9	–	21	.300
South Carolina State	5	–	11	.313	9	–	21	.300
North Carolina A&T	5	–	11	.313	9	–	23	.281
Howard	5	–	11	.313	8	–	25	.242
Bethune–Cookman	5	–	11	.313	7	–	25	.219
Maryland Eastern Shore	4	–	12	.250	6	–	24	.200
† 2014 MEAC tournament winner

The 2013–14 North Carolina A&T Aggies men's basketball team represented North Carolina Agricultural and Technical State University during the 2013–14 NCAA Division I men's basketball season. The Aggies, led by second year head coach Cy Alexander, played their home games at the Corbett Sports Center and were members of the Mid-Eastern Athletic Conference. They finished the season 9–23, 5–11 in MEAC play to finish in a five way tie for eighth place. They lost in the first round of the MEAC tournament to Howard.

== Roster ==
Number	Name	Position	Height	Weight	Year	Hometown
0	Jerome Simmons	Center/Forward	6–8	225	Freshman	Jacksonville, North Carolina
1	Julien Johnson	Forward	6–4	185	Freshman	Nags Head, North Carolina
3	Jeremy Underwood	Guard	6–0	185	Senior	Washington, D.C.
5	Bryan Akinkugbe	Center	6–9	225	Junior	Bowie, Maryland
10	James Whitaker	Guard	6–5	180	Freshman	Portsmouth, Virginia
11	Michael Briscoe	Guard	6–2	178	Freshman	Waldorf, Maryland
12	Ahmad Abdullah	Guard	6–0	175	Sophomore	Raleigh, North Carolina
15	Myles Jenkins	Guard	6–4	205	Freshman	Charlotte, North Carolina
20	Richaud Pack	Guard	6–3	183	Senior	Detroit, Michigan
21	Nick Reese	Forward	6–7	210	Freshman	Los Angeles
23	Denzel Keyes	Guard	6–4	210	Freshman	Kinston, North Carolina
30	Lamont Middleton	Guard	6–3	205	Senior	Bronx, New York
32	Bruce Beckford	Forward	6–7	215	Sophomore	Silver Spring, Maryland
33	Waylan Siverand	Forward	6–7	190	Junior	Houston, Texas
34	Khary Doby	Forward	6–6	206	Freshman	Marlboro, Maryland
42	Mourice Taylor	Forward	6–7	202	Freshman	Cambridge, Massachusetts
44	Steven Burrough	Center	6–9	245	Freshman	Charlotte, North Carolina

== Schedule ==
Date time, TV	Opponent	Result	Record	Site (attendance) city, state
Exhibition
11/04/2013*; 7:00 pm	Fayetteville State	W 71–65		Corbett Sports Center; Greensboro, North Carolina
11/06/2013*; 7:00 pm	Allen	W 76–39		Corbett Sports Center; Greensboro, North Carolina
Regular season
11/08/2013*; 7:00 pm	Greensboro College	W 91–64	1–0	Corbett Sports Center (1,389); Greensboro, North Carolina
11/11/2013*; 9:00 pm	at Utah Valley	L 71–78	1–1	UCCU Center (1,821); Orem, Utah
11/15/2013*; 7:00 pm	at Rhode Island	L 59–72	1–2	Ryan Center (4,821); Kingston, Rhode Island
11/24/2013*; 2:00 pm	at Georgia Tech; Barclays Center Classic	L 71–78	1–3	McCamish Pavilion (5,639); Atlanta
11/26/2013*; 4:00 pm	at Ole Miss; Barclays Center Classic	L 50–84	1–4	Tad Smith Coliseum (N/A); Oxford, Mississippi
11/29/2013*; 4:30 pm	vs. Longwood; Barclays Center Classic	W 85–78	2–4	Multipurpose Activity Center (1,150); West Long Branch, New Jersey
11/30/2013*; 7:00 pm	at Monmouth; Barclays Center Classic	L 61–76	2–5	Multipurpose Activity Center (1,498); West Long Branch, New Jersey
12/05/2013*; 7:00 pm	Wright State	W 62–59	3–5	Corbett Sports Center (1,859); Greensboro, North Carolina
12/07/2013*; 4:00 pm	at Radford	L 52–72	3–6	Dedmon Center (1,741); Radford, Virginia
12/14/2013*; 5:00 pm	at East Carolina	L 71–84	3–7	Minges Coliseum (4,438); Greenville, North Carolina
12/18/2013*; 7:00 pm	at Eastern Kentucky	L 73–84	3–8	McBrayer Arena (1,850); Richmond, Kentucky
12/21/2013*; 3:00 pm	at Saint Louis	L 57–79	3–9	Chaifetz Arena (8,015); St. Louis, Missouri
12/28/2013*; 2:00 pm	Georgia Southern	L 63–66	3–10	Corbett Sports Center (1,401); Greensboro, North Carolina
01/04/2014*; 7:00 pm	at Charlotte	L 72–88	3–11	Halton Arena (5,516); Charlotte, North Carolina
01/11/2014; 4:00 pm	at Bethune-Cookman	W 70–67	4–11 (1–0)	Moore Gymnasium (1,091); Daytona Beach, Florida
01/13/2014; 7:30 pm	at Florida A&M	L 66–76	4–12 (1–1)	Teaching Gym (899); Tallahassee, Florida
01/18/2014*; 7:00 pm	NJIT	W 88–82	5–12	Corbett Sports Center (2,855); Greensboro, North Carolina
01/20/2014; 7:00 pm, ESPNU	Delaware State	W 66–55	6–12 (2–1)	Corbett Sports Center (4,156); Greensboro, North Carolina
01/22/2014; 7:30 pm	at North Carolina Central	L 44–84	6–13 (2–2)	McLendon–McDougald Gymnasium (3,116); Durham, North Carolina
01/25/2014; 6:00 pm	Morgan State	W 68–67 ^{OT}	7–13 (3–2)	Corbett Sports Center (1,978); Greensboro, North Carolina
01/27/2014; 8:00 pm	Coppin State	L 54–70	7–14 (3–3)	Corbett Sports Center (2,493); Greensboro, North Carolina
02/01/2014; 4:00 pm	at Maryland Eastern Shore	L 60–67	7–15 (3–4)	Hytche Athletic Center (2,245); Princess Anne, Maryland
02/03/2014; 8:00 pm	at Howard	L 60–68	7–16 (3–5)	Burr Gymnasium (1,023); Washington, D.C.
02/08/2014; 6:00 pm	Florida A&M	W 84–78	8–16 (4–5)	Corbett Sports Center (1,854); Greensboro, North Carolina
02/10/2014; 8:00 pm	Bethune-Cookman	L 71–72	8–17 (4–6)	Corbett Sports Center (1,019); Greensboro, North Carolina
02/15/2014; 4:00 pm	at Savannah State	L 48–73	8–18 (4–7)	Tiger Arena (2,612); Savannah, Georgia
02/17/2014; 8:00 pm	at South Carolina State	L 70–75 ^{OT}	8–19 (4–8)	SHM Memorial Center (1,124); Orangeburg, South Carolina
02/22/2014; 6:00 pm	North Carolina Central	L 55–73	8–20 (4–9)	Corbett Sports Center (5,700); Greensboro, North Carolina
03/01/2014; 6:00 pm	Savannah State	L 67–71 ^{OT}	8–21 (4–10)	Corbett Sports Center (1,009); Greensboro, North Carolina
03/03/2014; 8:00 pm	South Carolina State	W 62–60	9–21 (5–10)	Corbett Sports Center (854); Greensboro, North Carolina
03/06/2014; 8:00 pm	at Hampton	L 71–89	9–22 (5–11)	Hampton Convocation Center (4,843); Hampton, Virginia
2014 MEAC tournament
03/11/2014; 4:00 pm	vs. Howard; First round	L 47–53	9–23	Norfolk Scope (4,658); Norfolk, Virginia
*Non-conference game. ^{#}Rankings from AP Poll. (#) Tournament seedings in parentheses. All times are in Eastern Time.
