= 2013–14 Florida A&M Rattlers basketball team =

American college basketball season

2013–14 Florida A&M Rattlers men's basketball
- Conference: Mid-Eastern Athletic Conference
- Record: 14–18 (8–8 MEAC)
- Head coach: Clemon Johnson (3rd season)
- Assistant coaches: Chadrick Johnson; Condric Sanders
- Home arena: Teaching Gym

2013–14 MEAC men's basketball standings
	Conf.				Overall
Team	W		L	PCT	W		L	PCT
North Carolina Central †	15	–	1	.938	28	–	6	.824
Hampton	13	–	3	.813	18	–	13	.581
Norfolk State	11	–	5	.688	19	–	15	.559
Morgan State	11	–	5	.688	15	–	16	.484
Savannah State	10	–	6	.625	13	–	19	.406
Florida A&M	8	–	8	.500	14	–	18	.438
Coppin State	7	–	9	.438	12	–	20	.375
Delaware State	5	–	11	.313	9	–	21	.300
South Carolina State	5	–	11	.313	9	–	21	.300
North Carolina A&T	5	–	11	.313	9	–	23	.281
Howard	5	–	11	.313	8	–	25	.242
Bethune–Cookman	5	–	11	.313	7	–	25	.219
Maryland Eastern Shore	4	–	12	.250	6	–	24	.200
† 2014 MEAC tournament winner

The 2013–14 Florida A&M Rattlers basketball team represented Florida A&M University during the 2013–14 NCAA Division I men's basketball season. The Rattlers, led by third-year head coach Clemon Johnson, played their home games at the Teaching Gym in Tallahassee, Florida as members of the Mid-Eastern Athletic Conference (MEAC). They finished the season 14–18, 8–8 in MEAC play, to finish in sixth place. They advanced to the quarterfinals of the MEAC tournament where they lost to Morgan State.

At the end of the season, head coach Clemon Johnson was fired. He posted a three-year record of 32–64.

== Roster ==
Number	Name	Position	Height	Weight	Year	Hometown
1	Willie Connor III	Guard	6' 5"	185	Sophomore	Chicago, IL
2	Christopher Rozier	Forward	6' 7"	245	Senior	Jacksonville, FL
3	Jamie Adams	Guard	5' 10"	166	Senior	Chicago, IL
4	Richie Spiller	Guard	6' 0"	185	Freshman	Miami, FL
12	Reggie Lewis	Guard	6' 2"	200	Senior	Cleveland, OH
15	D'Andre Bullard	Guard	6' 4"	185	Junior	Orlando, FL
20	Greg Nelson	Guard	6' 4"	230	Junior	Stuart, FL
21	Pierre Crawford	Center	6' 9"	256	Junior	Eutaw, AL
22	Mohammad Abdul-Aleem	Guard	6' 4"	210	Senior	Atlanta, GA
23	Jamari Bradford	Forward	6' 6"	210	Senior	Louisville, KY
24	Bobby King	Forward	6' 7"	220	Junior	Birmingham, AL
25	Trey Kellum	Forward	6' 6"	205	Sophomore	Peoria, IL
33	Walter Davis II	Guard	6' 5"	190	Senior	Memphis, TN
42	Onyekachukwu Odi	Forward	6' 8"	230	Senior	Nigeria

== Schedule ==
Date time, TV	Opponent	Result	Record	Site (attendance) city, state	
Regular season
November 8, 2013*; 7:00 p.m.		at Rutgers	L 84–92	0–1	The RAC (5,083); Piscataway, NJ
November 10, 2013*; 1:00 p.m.		at Princeton	L 50–67	0–2	Jadwin Gymnasium (1,511); Princeton, NJ
November 14, 2013*; 7:00 p.m.		Stetson	W 63–60	1–2	Teaching Gym (1,345); Tallahassee, FL
November 18, 2013*; 7:00 p.m.		at Toledo	L 69–79	1–3	Savage Arena (3,916); Toledo, OH
November 23, 2013*; 4:00 p.m.		at Jacksonville	L 72–76	1–4	Jacksonville Veterans Memorial Arena (788); Jacksonville, FL
November 27, 2013*; 1:00 p.m.		at UAB	W 85–73	1–5	Bartow Arena (3,319); Birmingham, AL
November 30, 2013*; 4:00 p.m.		Florida Memorial	W 100–82	2–5	Teaching Gym (375); Tallahassee, FL
December 5, 2013; 7:30 p.m.		at Norfolk State	L 87–91	2–6 (0–1)	Joseph G. Echols Memorial Hall (1,494); Norfolk, VA
December 7, 2013; 4:00 p.m.		at Hampton	L 62–72	2–7 (0–2)	Hampton Convocation Center (1,572); Hampton, VA
December 17, 2013*; 8:00 p.m.		at Mississippi State; Las Vegas Classic	L 65–78	2–8	Humphrey Coliseum (5,803); Starkville, MS
December 19, 2013*; 7:00 p.m.		at South Florida; Las Vegas Classic	L 70–73	2–9	USF Sun Dome (3,433); Tampa, FL
December 22, 2013*; 5:30 p.m.		vs. Florida Gulf Coast; Las Vegas Classic	L 68–77	2–10	Orleans Arena (N/A); Paradise, NV
December 23, 2013*; 2:30 p.m.		vs. Sacred Heart; Las Vegas Classic	W 75–70	3–10	Orleans Arena (N/A); Paradise, NV
January 2, 2014*; 7:00 p.m.		FIU	W 93–88 ^{OT}	4–10	Teaching Gym (459); Tallahassee, FL
January 4, 2014*; 8:00 p.m.		at Auburn	L 50–81	4–11	Auburn Arena (4,677); Auburn, AL
January 11, 2014; 6:00 p.m.		North Carolina Central	W 63–60	5–11 (1–2)	Teaching Gym (779); Tallahassee, FL
January 13, 2014; 7:30 p.m.		North Carolina A&T	W 76–66	6–11 (2–2)	Teaching Gym (899); Tallahassee, FL
January 18, 2014; 7:30 p.m.		at South Carolina State	W 78–72	7–11 (3–2)	SHM Memorial Center (1,024); Orangeburg, SC
January 20, 2014; 7:30 p.m.		at Savannah State	L 68–79	7–12 (3–3)	Tiger Arena (3,650); Savannah, GA
January 25, 2014; 6:00 p.m.		Howard	L 62–69	7–13 (3–4)	Teaching Gym (2,577); Tallahassee, FL
February 1, 2014; 4:00 p.m.		South Carolina State	L 59–63 ^{OT}	7–14 (3–5)	Teaching Gym (2,359); Tallahassee, FL
February 3, 2014; 7:30 p.m.		Savannah State	W 54–51	8–14 (4–5)	Teaching Gym (1,804); Tallahassee, FL
February 8, 2014; 4:00 p.m.		at North Carolina A&T	L 78–84	8–15 (4–6)	Corbett Sports Center (1,854); Greensboro, NC
February 10, 2014; 7:30 p.m.		at North Carolina Central	L 49–92	8–16 (4–7)	McLendon–McDougald Gymnasium (2,397); Durham, NC
February 15, 2014; 6:00 p.m.		Coppin State	W 82–71	9–16 (5–7)	Teaching Gym (1,802); Tallahassee, FL
February 17, 2014; 7:30 p.m.		Delaware State	W 68–63	10–16 (6–7)	Teaching Gym (1,345); Tallahassee, FL
February 22, 2014; 4:00 p.m.		at Bethune–Cookman	W 80–75	11–16 (7–7)	Moore Gymnasium (3,231); Daytona Beach, FL
February 26, 2014*; 7:00 p.m.		Edward Waters	W 104–69	12–16 (7–7)	Teaching Gym (N/A); Tallahassee, FL
March 3, 2014; 8:00 p.m.		at Morgan State	W 78–73	13–16 (8–7)	Talmadge L. Hill Field House (1,009); Baltimore, MD
March 6, 2014; 7:30 p.m.		Bethune–Cookman	L 68–70	13–17 (8–8)	Teaching Gym (2,376); Tallahassee, FL
MEAC tournament
March 11, 2014; 9:00 p.m.		vs. Delaware State; First round	W 65–61	14–17	Norfolk Scope (4,658); Norfolk, VA
March 13, 2014; 6:00 p.m.		vs. Morgan State; Quarterfinals	L 68–81	14–18	Norfolk Scope (N/A); Norfolk, VA
*Non-conference game. ^{#}Rankings from AP poll. (#) Tournament seedings in parentheses. All times are in Eastern.
