= 2013–14 Norfolk State Spartans men's basketball team =

American college basketball season

2013–14 Norfolk State Spartans men's basketball
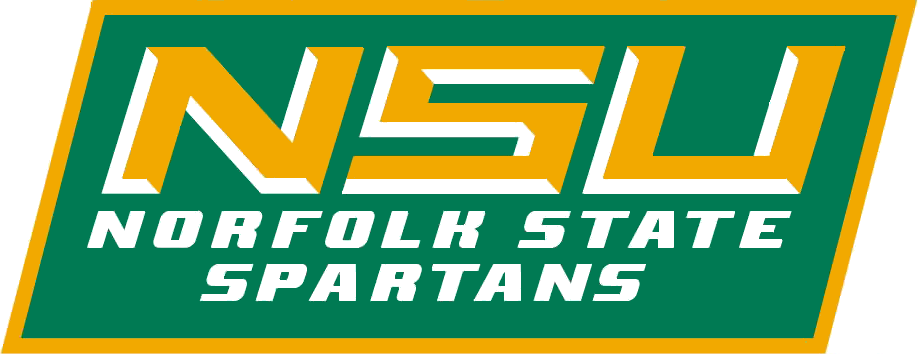

CIT, First round
- Conference: Mid-Eastern Athletic Conference
- Record: 19–15 (11–5 MEAC)
- Head coach: Robert Jones (1st season)
- Associate head coach: Larry Vickers
- Assistant coaches: Kevin DeVantier; Raru Archer
- Home arena: Joseph G. Echols Memorial Hall

2013–14 MEAC men's basketball standings
	Conf.				Overall
Team	W		L	PCT	W		L	PCT
North Carolina Central †	15	–	1	.938	28	–	6	.824
Hampton	13	–	3	.813	18	–	13	.581
Norfolk State	11	–	5	.688	19	–	15	.559
Morgan State	11	–	5	.688	15	–	16	.484
Savannah State	10	–	6	.625	13	–	19	.406
Florida A&M	8	–	8	.500	14	–	18	.438
Coppin State	7	–	9	.438	12	–	20	.375
Delaware State	5	–	11	.313	9	–	21	.300
South Carolina State	5	–	11	.313	9	–	21	.300
North Carolina A&T	5	–	11	.313	9	–	23	.281
Howard	5	–	11	.313	8	–	25	.242
Bethune–Cookman	5	–	11	.313	7	–	25	.219
Maryland Eastern Shore	4	–	12	.250	6	–	24	.200
† 2014 MEAC tournament winner

The 2013–14 Norfolk State Spartans men's basketball team represented Norfolk State University during the 2013–14 NCAA Division I men's basketball season. The Spartans, led by first year coach Robert Jones, played their home games at the Joseph G. Echols Memorial Hall and were members of the Mid-Eastern Athletic Conference. They finished the season 19–15, 11–5 in MEAC play to finish in a tie for third place. They advanced to the semifinals of the MEAC tournament where they lost to North Carolina Central. They were invited to the CollegeInsider.com Tournament where they lost in the first round to Eastern Michigan.

== Roster ==
Number	Name	Position	Height	Weight	Year	Hometown
0	Kievyn Lila-St.Rose	Guard/Forward	6–6	180	Junior	Corona, New York
3	Jamel Fuentes	Guard	6–4	190	Junior	Brooklyn, New York
4	Marese Phelps	Guard	6–1	190	Senior	Norfolk, Virginia
5	Anell Alexis	Guard/Forward	6–6	200	Senior	Hillsborough, New Jersey
11	Pendarvis Williams	Guard	6–6	195	Senior	Philadelphia, Pennsylvania
21	Jordan Weathers	Guard	6–5	200	Senior	Los Angeles, California
23	Brandon Goode	Forward/Center	7–0	225	Senior	Bronx, New York
24	Zieyik Estime	Guard	6–6	185	Senior	Harlem, New York
25	Malcolm Hawkins	Guard	6–5	210	Senior	Norfolk, Virginia
31	Riley Maye	Forward	6–8	220	Senior	East Stroudsburg, Pennsylvania
32	Paulius Vinogradovas	Center	7–1	215	Junior	Švenčionėliai, Lithuania
33	Hefeng Sun	Forward	6–8	245	Sophomore	Shenzhen, China
35	Rashid Gaston	Forward	6–8	230	Sophomore	Warren, Ohio
50	LaTre'e Russell	Forward	6–6	215	Junior	Chicago, Illinois

== Schedule ==
Date time, TV	Opponent	Result	Record	Site (attendance) city, state
Regular season
11/09/2013*; 6:00 pm	at Texas Southern	L 83–95	0–1	H&PE Arena (1,983); Houston, TX
11/13/2013*; 7:00 pm	Newberry	W 115–95	1–1	Joseph G. Echols Memorial Hall (1,700); Norfolk, VA
11/15/2013*; 8:00 pm	Virginia Union	W 92–84	2–1	Joseph G. Echols Memorial Hall (1,781); Norfolk, VA
11/18/2013*; 9:30 pm	vs. East Carolina; NIT Season Tip-Off	L 74–76	2–2	Cameron Indoor Stadium (9,314); Durham, NC
11/19/2013*; 8:30 pm	vs. UNC Asheville; NIT Season Tip-Off	W 80–78	3–2	Cameron Indoor Stadium (9,314); Durham, NC
11/25/2013*; 5:00 pm	vs. Fairleigh Dickinson; NIT Season Tip-Off	W 70–62	4–2	The RAC (392); Piscataway, NJ
11/26/2013*; 5:00 pm	vs. Stillman; NIT Season Tip-Off	W 105–83	5–2	The RAC (466); Piscataway, NJ
12/01/2013*; 2:00 pm	at LIU Brooklyn	L 72–74	5–3	Wellness, Recreation & Athletics Center (1,314); Brooklyn, NY
12/05/2013; 8:00 pm	Florida A&M	W 91–87	6–3 (1–0)	Joseph G. Echols Memorial Hall (1,494); Norfolk, VA
12/07/2013; 6:00 pm	Bethune-Cookman	W 59–45	7–3 (2–0)	Joseph G. Echols Memorial Hall (1,425); Norfolk, VA
12/15/2013*; 1:00 pm	at Boston University	W 86–82 ^{OT}	8–3	Case Gym (3,02); Boston, MA
12/19/2013*; 10:00 pm	vs. Seattle	L 67–70	8–4	ShoWare Center (1,151); Kent, WA
12/23/2013*; 7:00 pm, ESPN3	at Virginia	L 56–66	8–5	John Paul Jones Arena (9,206); Charlottesville, VA
12/31/2013*; 1:00 am	at Hawaiʻi	L 66–77	8–6	Stan Sheriff Center (5,635); Honolulu, HI
01/03/2014*; 7:00 pm	Mount St. Mary's	L 84–104	8–7	Joseph G. Echols Memorial Hall (700); Norfolk, VA
01/11/2014; 4:00 pm	at Maryland Eastern Shore	W 66–62	9–7 (3–0)	Hytche Athletic Center (1,411); Princess Anne, MD
01/13/2014; 7:30 pm	at Delaware State	W 58–56	10–7 (4–0)	Memorial Hall (1,365); Dover, DE
01/18/2014; 6:00 pm	Morgan State	L 70–87	10–8 (4–1)	Joseph G. Echols Memorial Hall (3,382); Norfolk, VA
01/20/2014; 8:00 pm	Coppin State	W 83–71	11–8 (5–1)	Joseph G. Echols Memorial Hall (1,425); Norfolk, VA
01/25/2014; 6:00 pm	at South Carolina State	L 61–73	11–9 (5–2)	SHM Memorial Center (444); Orangeburg, SC
01/27/2014; 7:00 pm, ESPNU	at Savannah State	W 56–49	12–9 (6–2)	Tiger Arena (1,860); Savannah, GA
02/01/2014*; 4:00 pm	at Miami (FL)	L 49–64	12–10	BankUnited Center (5,127); Coral Gables, FL
02/08/2014; 4:00 pm	at Morgan State	W 64–53	13–10 (7–2)	Talmadge L. Hill Field House (3,284); Baltimore, MD
02/10/2014; 8:00 pm	Howard	W 75–49	14–10 (8–2)	Joseph G. Echols Memorial Hall (1,226); Norfolk, VA
02/15/2014; 6:00 pm	Hampton	L 73–79 ^{OT}	14–11 (8–3)	Joseph G. Echols Memorial Hall (5,653); Norfolk, VA
02/22/2014; 4:00 pm	at Coppin State	W 73–68	15–11 (9–3)	Physical Education Complex (385); Baltimore, MD
02/24/2014; 7:30 pm	at Howard	W 66–60	16–11 (10–3)	Burr Gymnasium (1,113); Washington, D.C.
03/01/2014; 6:00 pm	at Hampton	L 53–61	16–12 (10–4)	Hampton Convocation Center (7,128); Hampton, VA
03/03/2014; 8:00 pm	Maryland Eastern Shore	W 77–65	17–12 (11–4)	Joseph G. Echols Memorial Hall (847); Norfolk, VA
03/06/2014; 8:00 pm	North Carolina Central	L 70–76	17–13 (11–5)	Joseph G. Echols Memorial Hall (1,309); Norfolk, VA
MEAC tournament
03/10/2014; 6:30 pm	vs. Maryland Eastern Shore; First round	W 78–74	18–13	Norfolk Scope (N/A); Norfolk, VA
03/13/2014; 8:00 pm	vs. Savannah State; Quarterfinals	W 57–47	19–13	Norfolk Scope (N/A); Norfolk, VA
03/14/2014; 6:00 pm	vs. North Carolina Central; Semifinals	L 45–68	19–14	Norfolk Scope (8,608); Norfolk, VA
CIT
03/18/2014*; 7:00 pm	at Eastern Michigan; First round	L 54–58	19–15	Convocation Center (373); Ypsilanti, MI
*Non-conference game. ^{#}Rankings from AP Poll. (#) Tournament seedings in parentheses. All times are in Eastern Time.
