= 2013–14 Maryland Eastern Shore Hawks men's basketball team =

American college basketball season

2013–14 Maryland Eastern Shore Hawks men's basketball
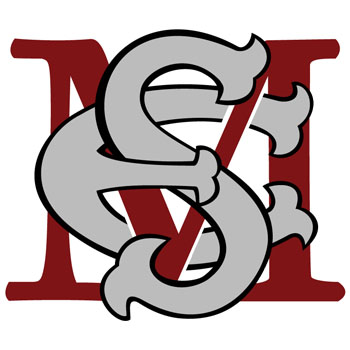
- Conference: Mid-Eastern Athletic Conference
- Record: 6–24 (4–12 MEAC)
- Head coach: Frankie Allen (6th season)
- Assistant coaches: Kevin Jones; Curtis Peery; Marlon Terry; Charles Fasnacht
- Home arena: Hytche Athletic Center

2013–14 MEAC men's basketball standings
	Conf.				Overall
Team	W		L	PCT	W		L	PCT
North Carolina Central †	15	–	1	.938	28	–	6	.824
Hampton	13	–	3	.813	18	–	13	.581
Norfolk State	11	–	5	.688	19	–	15	.559
Morgan State	11	–	5	.688	15	–	16	.484
Savannah State	10	–	6	.625	13	–	19	.406
Florida A&M	8	–	8	.500	14	–	18	.438
Coppin State	7	–	9	.438	12	–	20	.375
Delaware State	5	–	11	.313	9	–	21	.300
South Carolina State	5	–	11	.313	9	–	21	.300
North Carolina A&T	5	–	11	.313	9	–	23	.281
Howard	5	–	11	.313	8	–	25	.242
Bethune–Cookman	5	–	11	.313	7	–	25	.219
Maryland Eastern Shore	4	–	12	.250	6	–	24	.200
† 2014 MEAC tournament winner

The 2013–14 Maryland Eastern Shore Hawks men's basketball team represented the University of Maryland Eastern Shore during the 2013–14 NCAA Division I men's basketball season. The Hawks, led by sixth year head coach Frankie Allen, played their home games at the Hytche Athletic Center and were members of the Mid-Eastern Athletic Conference. They finished the season 6–24, 4–12 in MEAC play to finish in first place. They lost in the first round of the MEAC tournament to Norfolk State.

At the end of the season, head coach Frankie Allen was fired after a six-year record of 42–139.

== Roster ==
Number	Name	Position	Height	Weight	Year	Hometown
0	Hakeem Baxter	Guard	6–2	170	Freshman	Philadelphia, Pennsylvania
1	Iman Johnson	Forward	6–5	215	Junior	Milwaukee, Wisconsin
2	Ishaq Pitt	Guard	6–3	210	Junior	Toronto, Canada
3	Mark Blackmon	Guard	5–9	170	Junior	Brooklyn, New York
5	Lewis Bell	Guard	6–4	180	Senior	Washington, D.C.
10	Travis Trim	Guard	6–1	180	Sophomore	Port of Spain, Trinidad and Tobago
11	Devon Walker	Guard	6–4	215	Junior	Philadelphia, Pennsylvania
12	Shane Randall	Guard	6–5	210	Freshman	Philadelphia, Pennsylvania
13	Issac Smith III	Guard	6–1	170	Junior	Chicago, Illinois
23	Troy Snyder	Forward	6–6	215	Senior	Chicago, Illinois
24	Mike Myers	Forward	6–8	235	Junior	Camden, New Jersey
44	Pina Guillaume	Forward	6–9	230	Senior	N'Djamena, Chad
45	Kyree Jones	Guard	6–2	200	Junior	Indianapolis, Indiana
54	Francis Ezeiru	Center	6–10	260	Senior	Enugu, Nigeria

== Schedule ==
Date time, TV	Opponent	Result	Record	Site (attendance) city, state
Regular season
11/09/2013*; 7:00 pm	at Columbia	L 54–73	0–1	Levien Gymnasium (1,274); New York City, NY
11/12/2013*; 7:00 pm	Salisbury	W 95–55	1–1	Hytche Athletic Center (3,093); Princess Anne, MD
11/14/2013*; 7:00 pm, BTN	at Iowa	L 63–109	1–2	Carver–Hawkeye Arena (13,374); Iowa City, IA
11/20/2013*; 7:00 pm	Mount St. Mary's	W 78–71	2–2	Hytche Athletic Center (2,915); Princess Anne, MD
11/26/2013*; 7:00 pm	at Navy	L 59–67	2–3	Alumni Hall (1,220); Annopolis, MD
12/02/2013*; 7:00 pm	at UMBC	L 59–64	2–4	Retriever Activities Center (1,246); Catonsville, MD
12/15/2013*; 6:00 pm, Pac-12 Network	at Oregon State	L 66–98	2–5	Gill Coliseum (2,404); Corvallis, OR
12/17/2013*; 8:00 pm, ESPN3	at Purdue	L 50–79	2–6	Mackey Arena (8,081); West Lafayette, IN
12/21/2013*; 2:00 pm	Wilmington	L 62–65	2–7	Hytche Athletic Center (227); Princess Anne, MD
12/29/2013*; 2:00 pm	American	L 58–71	2–8	Hytche Athletic Center (229); Princess Anne, MD
12/31/2013*; 4:00 pm	at Virginia Tech	L 66–82	2–9	Cassell Coliseum (4,179); Blacksburg, VA
01/02/2014*; 7:00 pm	at Mississippi State	L 63–77	2–10	Humphrey Coliseum (5,708); Starkville, MS
01/06/2014; 8:00 pm	at Savannah State	L 42–66	2–11 (0–1)	Tiger Arena (410); Savannah, GA
01/08/2014; 7:30 pm	at South Carolina State	L 71–78	2–12 (0–2)	SHM Memorial Center (192); Orangeburg, SC
01/11/2014; 4:00 pm	Norfolk State	L 62–66	2–13 (0–3)	Hytche Athletic Center (1,411); Princess Anne, MD
01/18/2014; 4:00 pm	at Howard	L 55–88	2–14 (0–4)	Burr Gymnasium (787); Washington, D.C.
01/25/2014; 4:00 pm	at Bethune-Cookman	L 63–69	2–15 (0–5)	Moore Gymnasium (1,030); Daytona Beach, FL
02/01/2014; 4:00 pm	North Carolina A&T	W 67–60	3–15 (1–5)	Hytche Athletic Center (2,245); Princess Anne, MD
02/03/2014; 7:30 pm	North Carolina Central	L 62–66	3–16 (1–6)	Hytche Athletic Center (1,971); Princess Anne, MD
02/08/2014; 4:00 pm	Coppin State	L 50–58	3–17 (1–7)	Hytche Athletic Center (1,579); Princess Anne, MD
02/10/2014; 8:00 pm	at Hampton	L 65–71	3–18 (1–8)	Hampton Convocation Center (2,521); Hampton, VA
02/15/2014; 4:00 pm	Howard	W 87–73	4–18 (2–8)	Hytche Athletic Center (3,818); Princess Anne, MD
02/17/2014; 7:30 pm	Morgan State	L 72–88	4–19 (2–9)	Hytche Athletic Center (1,454); Princess Anne, MD
02/19/2014*; 7:00 pm	NJIT	L 76–77	4–20	Hytche Athletic Center (1,991); Princess Anne, MD
02/22/2014; 4:00 pm	at Delaware State	L 71–84	4–21 (2–10)	Memorial Hall (1,307); Dover, DE
02/24/2014; 7:30 pm	Hampton	L 89–104	4–22 (2–11)	Hytche Athletic Center (1,038); Princess Anne, MD
03/01/2014; 4:00 pm	at Coppin State	W 68–67	5–22 (3–11)	Physical Education Complex (2,899); Baltimore, MD
03/03/2014; 8:00 pm	at Norfolk State	L 65–77	5–23 (3–12)	Joseph G. Echols Memorial Hall (847); Norfolk, VA
03/06/2014; 7:30 pm	Delaware State	W 84–70	6–23 (4–12)	Hytche Athletic Center (4,405); Princess Anne, MD
2014 MEAC tournament
03/10/2014; 6:30 pm	vs. Norfolk State; First round	L 74–78	6–24	Norfolk Scope (N/A); Norfolk, VA
*Non-conference game. ^{#}Rankings from AP Poll. (#) Tournament seedings in parentheses. All times are in Eastern Time.
