= 2013–14 Savannah State Tigers basketball team =

American college basketball season

2013–14 Savannah State Tigers men's basketball
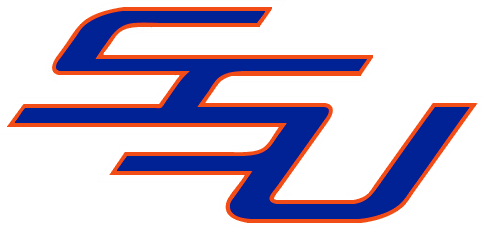
- Conference: Mid-Eastern Athletic Conference
- Record: 0–19, 13 wins vacated (0–6 MEAC, 10 wins vacated)
- Head coach: Horace Broadnax (9th season)
- Assistant coaches: Jay Gibbons; Clyde Wormley; Clifford Reed
- Home arena: Tiger Arena

2013–14 MEAC men's basketball standings
	Conf.				Overall
Team	W		L	PCT	W		L	PCT
North Carolina Central †	15	–	1	.938	28	–	6	.824
Hampton	13	–	3	.813	18	–	13	.581
Norfolk State	11	–	5	.688	19	–	15	.559
Morgan State	11	–	5	.688	15	–	16	.484
Savannah State	10	–	6	.625	13	–	19	.406
Florida A&M	8	–	8	.500	14	–	18	.438
Coppin State	7	–	9	.438	12	–	20	.375
Delaware State	5	–	11	.313	9	–	21	.300
South Carolina State	5	–	11	.313	9	–	21	.300
North Carolina A&T	5	–	11	.313	9	–	23	.281
Howard	5	–	11	.313	8	–	25	.242
Bethune–Cookman	5	–	11	.313	7	–	25	.219
Maryland Eastern Shore	4	–	12	.250	6	–	24	.200
† 2014 MEAC tournament winner

The 2013–14 Savannah State Tigers basketball team represented Savannah State University during the 2013–14 NCAA Division I men's basketball season. The Tigers, led by ninth-year head coach Horace Broadnax, played their home games at Tiger Arena in Savannah, Georgia and were members of the Mid-Eastern Athletic Conference (MEAC). They finished the season 13–19, 10–6 in MEAC play, to finish in fifth place. They advanced to the quarterfinals of the MEAC tournament where they lost to Norfolk State.

In 2019, all 13 wins were vacated due to academic certification errors.

== Roster ==
Number	Name	Position	Height	Weight	Year	Hometown
1	Alante Fenner	Guard	6' 5"	180	Freshman	Lake Wales, FL
2	Khiry White	Guard	6' 3"	180	Senior	Columbus, GA
4	Saadig Muhammad	Forward	6' 7"	210	Freshman	Savannah, GA
5	Jarvaris Jenkins	Guard/Forward	6' 5"	200	Freshman	Deerfield Beach, FL
10	Patrick Hendley	Guard	6' 4"	190	Senior	Orange Park, FL
11	Stephen Wilson	Guard	6' 1"	160	Senior	Jonesboro, GA
12	Joshua Montgomery	Forward	6' 4"	195	Senior	Smyrna, GA
14	Whitley Carter	Guard	5' 9"	145	Freshman	Lithia Springs, GA
15	Keierre Richards	Guard	6' 1"	180	Junior	Powder Springs, GA
20	Deven Williams	Guard	6' 0"	205	Senior	Indianapolis, IN
22	Terel Hall	Guard	6' 1"	185	Junior	Dawson, GA
30	Jeremiah Hill	Guard	6' 1"	175	Freshman	Richmond Hill, GA
33	Angelo Davis	Guard	6' 2"	175	Senior	Savannah, GA
42	Hikeem Champaigne	Forward/Center	6' 9"	216	Junior	Charleston, SC
44	Jyles Smith	Forward	6' 9"	215	Senior	Fairburn, GA

== Schedule ==
Date time, TV	Opponent	Result	Record	Site (attendance) city, state
Exhibition
October 31, 2013*; 8:00 p.m.	Armstrong Atlantic State	W 73–61		Tiger Arena (3,945); Savannah, GA
Regular season
November 8, 2013*; 7:00 p.m.	at Pittsburgh	L 55–88	0–1	Petersen Events Center (9,235); Pittsburgh, PA
November 9, 2013*; 7:00 p.m.	at Robert Morris	L 66–86	0–2	Charles L. Sewall Center (1,124); Moon Township, PA
November 12, 2013*; 7:00 p.m.	Tennessee Temple	W 73–63	1–2	Tiger Arena (1,330); Savannah, GA
November 14, 2013*; 7:00 p.m.	Florida National	W 87–60	2–2	Tiger Arena (1,110); Savannah, GA
November 18, 2013*; 7:30 p.m.	at North Florida	L 63–66	2–3	UNF Arena (1,041); Jacksonville, FL
November 21, 2013*; 7:00 p.m.	vs. Lamar; Global Sports Hoops Showcase	L 66–75	2–4	Jon M. Huntsman Center (293); Salt Lake City, UT
November 22, 2013*; 6:00 p.m.	vs. Grand Canyon; Global Sports Hoops Showcase	L 71–72	2–5	Jon M. Huntsman Center (275); Salt Lake City, UT
November 23, 2013*; 7:00 p.m., P12N	at Utah; Global Sports Hoops Showcase	L 57–71	2–6	Jon M. Huntsman Center (7,568); Salt Lake City, UT
November 26, 2013*; 7:00 p.m.	North Florida	L 61–65	2–7	Tiger Arena (630); Savannah, GA
December 10, 2013*; 8:00 p.m.	at Northern Iowa	L 50–55	2–8	McLeod Center (3,145); Cedar Falls, IA
December 12, 2013*; 8:00 p.m., RSN	at Arkansas	L 43–72	2–9	Bud Walton Arena (11,449); Fayetteville, AR
December 19, 2013*; 7:00 p.m.	Miami (FL)	L 51–68	2–10	Tiger Arena (3,370); Savannah, GA
December 29, 2013*; 3:00 p.m., Sun	at No. 13 Florida	L 34–76	2–11	O'Connell Center (10,508); Gainesville, FL
January 3, 2014*; 8:00 p.m., FSSW+	at No. 9 Baylor	L 50–80	2–12	Ferrell Center (5,685); Waco, TX
January 6, 2014; 8:00 p.m.	Maryland Eastern Shore	W 66–42	3–12 (1–0)	Tiger Arena (410); Savannah, GA
January 11, 2014; 4:00 p.m.	at Coppin State	W 75–53	4–12 (2–0)	Physical Education Complex (671); Baltimore, MD
January 13, 2014; 7:30 p.m.	at Howard	W 56–54	5–12 (3–0)	Burr Gymnasium (2,750); Washington, D.C.
January 18, 2014; 6:00 p.m.	Bethune-Cookman	W 70–60 ^{OT}	6–12 (4–0)	Tiger Arena (3,220); Savannah, GA
January 20, 2014; 8:00 p.m.	Florida A&M	W 79–68	7–12 (5–0)	Tiger Arena (3,650); Savannah, GA
January 25, 2014; 6:00 p.m.	Hampton	L 71–80	7–13 (5–1)	Tiger Arena (2,010); Savannah, GA
January 27, 2014; 8:00 p.m.	Norfolk State	L 49–56	7–14 (5–2)	Tiger Arena (1,860); Savannah, GA
February 1, 2014; 4:00 p.m.	at Bethune-Cookman	W 50–40	8–14 (6–2)	Moore Gymnasium (1,075); Daytona Beach, FL
February 3, 2014; 4:00 p.m.	at Florida A&M	L 51–54	8–15 (6–3)	Teaching Gym (1,804); Tallahassee, FL
February 10, 2014; 7:30 p.m.	at Delaware State	L 59–79	8–16 (6–4)	Memorial Hall (479); Dover, DE
February 15, 2014; 6:00 p.m.	North Carolina A&T	W 73–48	9–16 (7–4)	Tiger Arena (2,612); Savannah, GA
February 17, 2014; 8:00 p.m.	North Carolina Central	L 62–76	9–17 (7–5)	Tiger Arena (1,230); Savannah, GA
February 22, 2014; 6:00 p.m.	at South Carolina State	W 75–65	10–17 (8–5)	SHM Memorial Center (927); Orangeburg, SC
March 1, 2014; 6:00 p.m.	at North Carolina A&T	W 71–67 ^{OT}	11–17 (9–5)	Corbett Sports Center (1,009); Greensboro, NC
March 3, 2014; 7:30 p.m.	at North Carolina Central	L 57–64 ^{OT}	11–18 (9–6)	McLendon–McDougald Gymnasium (2,732); Durham, NC
March 6, 2014; 8:00 p.m.	South Carolina State	W 69–50	12–18 (10–6)	Tiger Arena (2,300); Savannah, GA
MEAC tournament
March 10, 2014; 9:00 p.m.	vs. South Carolina State; First round	W 61–47	13–18	Norfolk Scope (N/A); Norfolk, VA
March 13, 2014; 8:00 p.m.	vs. Norfolk State; Quarterfinals	L 47–57	13–19	Norfolk Scope (N/A); Norfolk, VA
*Non-conference game. ^{#}Rankings from AP poll. (#) Tournament seedings in parentheses. All times are in Eastern.
