= 2013–14 Oregon State Beavers men's basketball team =

American college basketball season

2013–14 Oregon State Beavers men's basketball

CBI, First round
- Conference: Pac-12 Conference
- Record: 16–16 (8–10 Pac-12)
- Head coach: Craig Robinson
- Assistant coaches: Doug Stewart; Nate Pomeday; Freddie Owens
- Home arena: Gill Coliseum

2013–14 Pac-12 Conference men's basketball standings
	Conf.				Overall
Team	W		L	PCT	W		L	PCT
No. 4 Arizona	15	–	3	.833	33	–	5	.868
No. 20 UCLA †	12	–	6	.667	28	–	9	.757
Oregon	10	–	8	.556	24	–	10	.706
Colorado	10	–	8	.556	23	–	12	.657
Arizona State	10	–	8	.556	21	–	12	.636
Stanford	10	–	8	.556	23	–	13	.639
California	10	–	8	.556	21	–	14	.600
Utah	9	–	9	.500	21	–	12	.636
Washington	9	–	9	.500	17	–	15	.531
Oregon State	8	–	10	.444	16	–	16	.500
Washington State	3	–	15	.167	10	–	21	.323
USC	2	–	16	.111	11	–	21	.344
† Conference tournament winner Rankings from AP poll

The 2013–14 Oregon State Beavers men's basketball team represented Oregon State University in the 2013–14 NCAA Division I men's basketball season. Led by sixth year head coach Craig Robinson. The Beavers played their home games at Gill Coliseum in Corvallis, Oregon and were a member of the Pac-12 Conference.

== 2013 recruiting class ==
College recruiting information
Name	Hometown	School	Height	Weight	Commit date
Cheikh N'diaye; C	San Diego, CA	Army & Navy Academy	6 ft 10 in (2.08 m)	210 lb (95 kg)	Jun 13, 2012
Cheikh N'diaye; C	Recruit ratings: Scout: Rivals: (69)				
Hallice Cooke; SG	Union City, NJ	St. Anthony High School - Jersey City, NJ	6 ft 3 in (1.91 m)	185 lb (84 kg)	Sep 8, 2012
Hallice Cooke; SG	Recruit ratings: Scout: Rivals: (66)				
Malcolm Duvivier; SG	Toronto, ON	St. Thomas Aquinas High School	6 ft 2 in (1.88 m)	175 lb (79 kg)	May 16, 2013
Malcolm Duvivier; SG	Recruit ratings: Scout: Rivals: (N/A)				
Overall recruit ranking: Scout: – Rivals: –
Note: In many cases, Scout, Rivals, 247Sports, On3, and ESPN may conflict in their listings of height and weight.; In these cases, the average was taken. ESPN grades are on a 100-point scale.; Sources: "ESPN – Oregon State Beavers Basketball Recruiting 2012". ESPN.; "2013 Team Ranking". Rivals.

== Roster ==
2013–14 Oregon State Beavers men's basketball team
Players
Coaches

Pos.	#	Name	Height	Weight	Year	Hometown
G/F	1	Victor Robbins	6 ft 7 in (2.01 m)	197 lb (89 kg)	So	Compton, California
G	2	Michael Moyer	6 ft 3 in (1.91 m)	207 lb (94 kg)	RS Sr	Turner, Oregon
G	3	Hallice Cooke	6 ft 3 in (1.91 m)	185 lb (84 kg)	Fr	Union City, New Jersey
G	4	Challe Barton	6 ft 3 in (1.91 m)	197 lb (89 kg)	Jr	Gothenburg, Sweden
C	5	Cheikh N'diaye	7 ft 0 in (2.13 m)	230 lb (104 kg)	Fr	Dakar, Senegal
C	10	Daniel Jones	6 ft 11 in (2.11 m)	219 lb (99 kg)	Sr	Orland, California
G	11	Malcolm Duvivier	6 ft 2 in (1.88 m)	205 lb (93 kg)	Fr	Toronto, ON
C	12	Angus Brandt	6 ft 10 in (2.08 m)	246 lb (112 kg)	RS Sr	Sydney, Australia
G	13	Langston Morris-Walker	6 ft 5 in (1.96 m)	216 lb (98 kg)	So	Berkeley, California
F	14	Daniel Gomis	6 ft 10 in (2.08 m)	223 lb (101 kg)	RS So	Thiès, Senegal
F	15	Eric Moreland	6 ft 10 in (2.08 m)	218 lb (99 kg)	RS Jr	Missouri City, Texas
G	24	C.J. Mitchell	6 ft 1 in (1.85 m)	182 lb (83 kg)	Sr	Portland, Oregon
F	30	Olaf Schaftenaar	6 ft 10 in (2.08 m)	224 lb (102 kg)	So	Utrecht, Netherlands
F	32	Jarmal Reid	6 ft 7 in (2.01 m)	231 lb (105 kg)	So	Decatur, Georgia
F	44	Devon Collier	6 ft 8 in (2.03 m)	216 lb (98 kg)	Sr	Bronx, New York
G	55	Roberto Nelson	6 ft 4 in (1.93 m)	198 lb (90 kg)	Sr	Santa Barbara, California

Head coach

- Craig Robinson (Princeton)

Assistant coach(es)

- Doug Stewart (Brown)
- Nate Pomeday (Northwestern)
- Freddie Owens (Wisconsin)

Legend

- (C) Team captain
- (S) Suspended
- (I) Ineligible
- (W) Walk-on
- Injured
- Current redshirt

Roster
Last update: 2012-10-13

== Schedule ==
Date time, TV	Rank^{#}	Opponent^{#}	Result	Record	Site (attendance) city, state
Exhibition
10/29/2013*; 7:00 pm		Corban	W 69–42	–	Gill Coliseum (3,190); Corvallis, OR
11/05/2013*; 7:00 pm		Concordia	W 104–94	–	Gill Coliseum (2,862); Corvallis, OR
Non-conference regular season
11/10/2013*; 5:00 pm, P12N		Coppin State	L 73–78	0–1	Gill Coliseum (4,062); Corvallis, OR
11/13/2013*; 6:00 pm, P12N		Portland	W 79–73	1–1	Gill Coliseum (3,179); Corvallis, OR
11/17/2013*; 3:00 pm, ESPNU		at Maryland	W 90–83	2–1	Comcast Center (14,776); College Park, MD
11/26/2013*; 8:00 pm, P12N		SIU Edwardsville	W 101–81	3–1	Gill Coliseum (4,823); Corvallis, OR
12/01/2013*; 2:00 pm, FS1		at DePaul	L 81–93	3–2	Allstate Arena (6,765); Rosemont, IL
12/13/2013*; 5:00 pm, P12N		Arkansas–Pine Bluff	W 77–63	4–2	Gill Coliseum (2,369); Corvallis, OR
12/15/2013*; 3:00 pm, P12N		Maryland Eastern Shore	W 98–66	5–2	Gill Coliseum (2,404); Corvallis, OR
12/18/2013*; 7:00 pm, P12N		Towson	W 76–67	6–2	Gill Coliseum (3,042); Corvallis, OR
12/22/2013*; 4:30 pm, ESPNU		vs. Akron; Diamond Head Classic First Round	L 71–83	6–3	Stan Sheriff Center (8,694); Honolulu, HI
12/23/2013*; 1:30 pm, ESPNU		vs. George Mason; Diamond Head Classic Consolation 2nd round	W 58–54	7–3	Stan Sheriff Center (N/A); Honolulu, HI
12/25/2013*; 1:00 pm, ESPNU		at Hawaiʻi; Diamond Head Classic 5th place game	L 73–79	7–4	Stan Sheriff Center (6,572); Honolulu, HI
12/29/2013*; 8:00 pm, P12N		Quinnipiac	W 76–68	8–4	Gill Coliseum (3,297); Corvallis, OR
Pac-12 regular season
01/02/2014; 7:00 pm, ESPNU		at No. 20 Colorado	L 58–64	8–5 (0–1)	Coors Events Center (9,851); Boulder, CO
01/04/2014; 1:00 pm, P12N		at Utah	L 69–80	8–6 (0–2)	Jon M. Huntsman Center (14,044); Salt Lake City, UT
01/09/2014; 7:00 pm, P12N		Stanford	W 81–72	9–6 (1–2)	Gill Coliseum (4,308); Corvallis, OR
01/11/2014; 5:00 pm, ESPNU		California	L 83–88	9–7 (1–3)	Gill Coliseum (5,125); Corvallis, OR
01/19/2014; 5:00 pm, ESPNU		Oregon; Civil War	W 80–72	10–7 (2–3)	Gill Coliseum (6,358); Corvallis, OR
01/22/2014; 7:00 pm, P12N		at Washington State	W 66–55	11–7 (3–3)	Beasley Coliseum (2,632); Pullman, WA
01/25/2014; 2:00 pm, P12N		at Washington	L 81–87	11–8 (3–4)	Alaska Airlines Arena (7,112); Seattle, WA
01/30/2014; 6:00 pm, P12N		USC	W 76–75 ^{OT}	12–8 (4–4)	Gill Coliseum (3,774); Corvallis, OR
02/02/2014; 11:00 am, ESPNU		UCLA	W 71–67	13–8 (5–4)	Gill Coliseum (4,509); Corvallis, OR
02/06/2014; 8:00 pm, FS1		at Arizona State	L 82–86 ^{OT}	13–9 (5–5)	Wells Fargo Arena (5,815); Corvallis, OR
02/09/2014; 4:00 pm, P12N		at No. 2 Arizona	L 54–76	13–10 (5–6)	McKale Center (14,545); Tucson, AZ
02/16/2014; 12:00 pm, FS1		at Oregon; Civil War	L 83–93	13–11 (5–7)	Matthew Knight Arena (10,013); Eugene, OR
02/20/2014; 7:00 pm, P12N		Washington State	W 68-57	14–11 (6–7)	Gill Coliseum (3,618); Corvallis, OR
02/22/2014; 1:00 pm, P12N		Washington	L 62–86	14–12 (6–8)	Gill Coliseum (5,280); Corvallis, OR
02/27/2014; 8:00 pm, FS1		at USC	W 76–66	15–12 (7–8)	Galen Center (3,352); Los Angeles, CA
03/02/2014; 6:00 pm, FS1		at UCLA	L 69–74	15–13 (7–9)	Pauley Pavilion (9,873); Los Angeles, CA
03/06/2014; 8:00 pm, FS1		No. 3 Arizona	L 69–74	15–14 (7–10)	Gill Coliseum (5,651); Corvallis, OR
03/08/2014; 1:30 pm, P12N		Arizona State	W 78–76 ^{OT}	16–14 (8–10)	Gill Coliseum; Corvallis, OR
Pac-12 tournament
03/12/2014; 6:00 pm, P12N		vs. Oregon; First round	L 74–88	16–15	MGM Grand Garden Arena (9,047); Paradise, NV
CBI
03/19/2014; 7:00 pm		Radford; First round	L 92–96	16–16	Gill Coliseum (1,351); Corvallis, OR
*Non-conference game. ^{#}Rankings from AP Poll. (#) Tournament seedings in parentheses. All times are in Pacific Time.
