= 2013–14 Maryland Terrapins men's basketball team =

American college basketball season

2013–14 Maryland Terrapins men's basketball
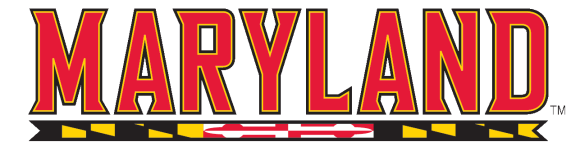

Paradise Jam tournament champions
- Conference: Atlantic Coast Conference
- Record: 17–15 (9–9 ACC)
- Head coach: Mark Turgeon (3rd season)
- Assistant coaches: Dustin Clark; Bino Ranson; Scott Spinelli
- Home arena: Comcast Center

2013–14 ACC men's basketball standings
	Conf.				Overall
Team	W		L	PCT	W		L	PCT
No. 3 Virginia †	16	–	2	.889	30	–	7	.811
No. 14 Syracuse	14	–	4	.778	28	–	6	.824
No. 8 Duke	13	–	5	.722	26	–	9	.743
No. 19 North Carolina	13	–	5	.722	24	–	10	.706
Pittsburgh	11	–	7	.611	26	–	10	.722
Clemson	10	–	8	.556	23	–	13	.639
NC State	9	–	9	.500	22	–	14	.611
Maryland	9	–	9	.500	17	–	15	.531
Florida State	9	–	9	.500	22	–	14	.611
Miami (FL)	7	–	11	.389	17	–	16	.515
Wake Forest	6	–	12	.333	17	–	16	.515
Georgia Tech	6	–	12	.333	16	–	17	.485
Notre Dame	6	–	12	.333	15	–	17	.469
Boston College	4	–	14	.222	8	–	24	.250
Virginia Tech	2	–	16	.111	9	–	22	.290
† 2014 ACC tournament winner Rankings from AP poll

The 2013–14 Maryland Terrapins men's basketball team represented the University of Maryland, College Park in 2013–14 NCAA Division I men's basketball season as a member of the Atlantic Coast Conference (ACC). They were led by third year head coach Mark Turgeon and played their home games at the Comcast Center. They finished the season 17–15, 9–9 in ACC play to finish in a three way tie for seventh place. They lost in the second round of the ACC tournament to Florida State.

This was the final season that Maryland competed in the ACC, as they joined the Big Ten Conference on July 1, 2014.

== Pre-season ==
=== Departures ===
Name	Number	Pos.	Height	Weight	Year	Hometown	Notes
Logan Aronhalt	2	G	6'3	205	Senior	Zanesville, Ohio	Graduated
Pe'Shon Howard	21	G	6'3"	190	Junior	Los Angeles, California	Transferred
Alex Len	25	C	7'1"	250	Sophomore	Antratsyt, Ukraine	Declared for NBA Draft
James Padgett	35	F	6'8"	235	Senior	Brooklyn, New York	Graduated

=== Class of 2013 signees ===
College recruiting
Name	Hometown	School	Height	Weight	Commit date
Damonte Dodd; C	Centreville, Maryland	Massanutten Military Academy	6 ft 9 in (2.06 m)	240 lb (110 kg)	Feb 21, 2012
Damonte Dodd; C	Recruit ratings: Scout: Rivals: ESPN: (79)				
Roddy Peters; PG	District Heights, Maryland	Suitland High School	6 ft 4 in (1.93 m)	180 lb (82 kg)	Oct 16, 2012
Roddy Peters; PG	Recruit ratings: Scout: Rivals: ESPN: (87)				
Overall recruit ranking:
Note: In many cases, Scout, Rivals, 247Sports, On3, and ESPN may conflict in their listings of height and weight.; In these cases, the average was taken. ESPN grades are on a 100-point scale.; Sources: "2013 Team Ranking". Rivals.

== Roster ==
Hometowns of team roster

2013–14 Maryland Terrapins men's basketball team
Players
Coaches

Pos.	#	Name	Height	Weight	Year	Hometown
PF	0	Charles Mitchell	6 ft 7 in (2.01 m)	260 lb (118 kg)	So	Atlanta, Georgia
PF	1	Evan Smotrycz	6 ft 9 in (2.06 m)	235 lb (107 kg)	RS Jr	Reading, Massachusetts
G	4	Jacob Susskind (W)	6 ft 5 in (1.96 m)	205 lb (93 kg)	Jr	West Orange, New Jersey
SG	5	Nick Faust	6 ft 6 in (1.98 m)	175 lb (79 kg)	Jr	Baltimore, Maryland
SF	10	Jake Layman	6 ft 9 in (2.06 m)	190 lb (86 kg)	So	Wrentham, Massachusetts
F	15	Spencer Barks (W)	6 ft 9 in (2.06 m)	225 lb (102 kg)	Jr	Poolesville, Maryland
F	23	John Auslander (W)	6 ft 7 in (2.01 m)	225 lb (102 kg)	Sr	Herndon, Virginia
G	4	Seth Allen (injured)	6 ft 1 in (1.85 m)	190 lb (86 kg)	So	Woodbridge, Virginia
C	44	Shaquille Cleare	6 ft 9 in (2.06 m)	270 lb (122 kg)	So	Andros, Bahamas
G	12	Conner Lipinski (W)	5 ft 10 in (1.78 m)	155 lb (70 kg)	So	Gambrills, Maryland
G/F	32	Dez Wells	6 ft 4 in (1.93 m)	215 lb (98 kg)	Jr	Raleigh, North Carolina
G	11	Varun Ram (W)	5 ft 9 in (1.75 m)	150 lb (68 kg)	Jr	Clarksville, Maryland
G	2	Roddy Peters	6 ft 4 in (1.93 m)	195 lb (88 kg)	Fr	District Heights, Maryland
C	35	Damonte Dodd	6 ft 10 in (2.08 m)	240 lb (109 kg)	Fr	Centreville, Maryland
F	33	A. J. Metz (W)	6 ft 7 in (2.01 m)	215 lb (98 kg)	Fr	Leesburg, Virginia
F	25	Jonathan Graham	6 ft 7 in (2.01 m)	220 lb (100 kg)	Jr	Baltimore, Maryland

Head coach

- Mark Turgeon (Kansas)

Assistant coach(es)

- Dalonte Hill (Bowie State)
- Bino Ranson (SNHU)
- Scott Spinelli (Boston University)

Legend

- (C) Team captain
- (S) Suspended
- (I) Ineligible
- (W) Walk-on
- Injured
- Current redshirt

Roster
Last update: 10/11/2012

== Schedule and results ==
Date time, TV	Opponent	Result	Record	High points	High rebounds	High assists	Site (attendance) city, state
Bahamas exhibition tour
Aug 6*; 7:00 pm, –	vs. Bahamas All-Stars	W 92–84	–	25 – Layman	– – –	– – –	Kendal G. L. Isaacs National Gymnasium (–); Nassau, Bahamas
Aug 7*; 7:00 pm, –	vs. Commonwealth Giants	W 97–90	–	26 – Allen	11 – Mitchell	11 – Allen	Kendal G. L. Isaacs National Gymnasium (–); Nassau, Bahamas
Aug 9*; 11:00 am, –	vs. Grand Bahamas All-Stars	W 88–77	–	25 – Layman	– – –	– – –	Kendal G. L. Isaacs National Gymnasium (–); Nassau, Bahamas
Exhibition
Nov 3*; 1:00 pm, TerpsTV	Catholic	W 84–39	–	23 – Layman	11 – Mitchell	4 – Smotrycz	Comcast Center (7,019); College Park, MD
Non-conference regular season
Nov 8*; 6:30 pm, ESPN2	vs. No. 18 UConn	L 77–78	0–1	17 – Faust	9 – Smotrycz	6 – Wells	Barclays Center (12,687); Brooklyn, NY
Nov 13*; 7:00 pm, CSN	Abilene Christian	W 67–44	1–1	19 – Layman	11 – Mitchell	3 – Layman, Wells	Comcast Center (9,117); College Park, MD
Nov 17*; 6:00 pm, ESPNU	Oregon State	L 83–90	1–2	23 – Wells	8 – Mitchell	6 – Peters	Comcast Center (14,776); College Park, MD
Nov 22*; 5:00 pm, CBSSN	vs. Marist; Paradise Jam tournament first round	W 68–43	2–2	16 – Layman	8 – Layman, Mitchell	3 – Ram	Sports and Fitness Center (1,527); Saint Thomas, U.S. Virgin Islands
Nov 24*; 7:00 pm, CBSSN	vs. Northern Iowa; Paradise Jam Tournament semifinals	W 80–66	3–2	20 – Smotrycz	9 – Smotrycz	6 – Wells	Sports and Fitness Center (1,766); Saint Thomas, U.S. Virgin Islands
Nov 25*; 11:00 pm, CBSSN	vs. Providence; Paradise Jam Tournament championship	W 56–52	4–2	13 – Smotrycz, Wells	11 – Smotrycz	3 – Peters, Smotrycz	Sports and Fitness Center (2,655); Saint Thomas, U.S. Virgin Islands
Nov 29*; 6:00 pm, ESPNU	Morgan State	W 89–62	5–2	27 – Layman	12 – Smotrycz	6 – Peters	Comcast Center (9,517); College Park, MD
Dec 4*; 7:00 pm, ESPN2	at No. 5 Ohio State; ACC–Big Ten Challenge	L 60–76	5–3	19 – Wells	11 – Mitchell	4 – Peters	Value City Arena (16,206); Columbus, OH
Dec 8*; 3:30 pm, MASN	vs. George Washington; BB&T Classic	L 75–77	5–4	16 – Wells	6 – Smotrycz, Layman, Mitchell	3 – Peters, Faust	Verizon Center (9,183); Washington, DC
Dec 12; 7:00 pm, ESPNU	at Boston College	W 88–80	6–4 (1–0)	33 – Wells	5 – Wells	3 – Peters	Conte Forum (3,516); Chestnut Hill, MA
Dec 14*; 2:00 pm, CSN	Florida Atlantic	W 66–62	7–4	22 – Layman	7 – Smotrycz	5 – Peters	Comcast Center (9,265); College Park, MD
Dec 21*; 1:00 pm, ESPN3	Boston University	L 77–83	7–5	18 – Wells	13 – Smotrycz	7 – Peters	Comcast Center (10,882); College Park, MD
Dec 29*; 7:00 pm, ESPNU	Tulsa	W 85–74	8–5	18 – Wells	10 – Wells	3 – Allen, Layman	Comcast Center (10,251); College Park, MD
Dec 31*; 2:30 pm, ESPN3	North Carolina Central	W 70–56	9–5	19 – Faust	9 – Faust	4 – Allen	Comcast Center (9,554); College Park, MD
Jan 4; 2:00 pm, ACCN	Georgia Tech	W 77–61	10–5 (2–0)	16 – Faust	11 – Mitchell	5 – Peters	Comcast Center (12,545); College Park, MD
Jan 6; 7:00 pm, ESPN2	at Pittsburgh	L 59–79	10–6 (2–1)	18 – Allen	5 – Graham	2 – Allen, Peters, Wells	Petersen Events Center (12,508); Pittsburgh, PA
Jan 12; 8:00 pm, ESPNU	at Florida State	L 61–85	10–7 (2–2)	15 – Wells	8 – Smotrycz	3 – Allen	Donald L. Tucker Center (7,516); Tallahassee, FL
Jan 15; 7:00 pm, ESPN2	Notre Dame	W 74–66	11–7 (3–2)	17 – Wells	10 – Layman	4 – Allen	Comcast Center (13,878); College Park, MD
Jan 20; 9:00 pm, ESPNU	at NC State	L 56–65	11–8 (3–3)	10 – Smotrycz, Wells	18 – Mitchell	5 – Allen	PNC Arena (11,447); Raleigh, NC
Jan 25; 6:00 pm, ESPN	No. 20 Pittsburgh	L 79–83	11–9 (3–4)	19 – Wells	7 – Smotrycz	6 – Allen	Comcast Center (17,202); College Park, MD
Jan 29; 9:00 pm, ACCN	Miami	W 74–71	12–9 (4–4)	21 – Wells	4 – Layman, Wells	4 – Smotrycz	Comcast Center (12,061); College Park, MD
Feb 1; 12:00 pm, ACCN	at Virginia Tech	W 80–60	13–9 (5–4)	19 – Wells	6 – Mitchell	7 – Allen	Cassell Coliseum (5,110); Blacksburg, VA
Feb 4; 12:00 pm, ACCN	at North Carolina	L 63–75	13–10 (5–5)	18 – Wells	13 – Mitchell	4 – Faust	Dean E. Smith Center (17,225); Chapel Hill, NC
Feb 8; 3:00 pm, ESPN2	Florida State	W 83–71	14–10 (6–5)	32 – Allen	6 – Cleare	6 – Wells	Comcast Center (14,783); College Park, MD
Feb 10; 7:00 pm, ESPN	at No. 17 Virginia	L 53–61	14–11 (6–6)	15 – Allen	5 – Mitchell, Smotrycz	4 – Wells	John Paul Jones Arena (11,568); Charlottesville, VA
Feb 15; 6:00 pm, ESPN	at No. 8 Duke	L 67–69	14–12 (6–7)	18 – Layman	8 – Smotrycz	3 – Wells	Cameron Indoor Stadium (9,314); Durham, NC
Feb 18; 7:00 pm, RSN	Wake Forest	W 71–60	15–12 (7–7)	20 – Faust	7 – Mitchell	4 – Faust	Comcast Center (10,665); College Park, MD
Feb 24; 7:00 pm, ESPN	No. 4 Syracuse	L 55–57	15–13 (7–8)	22 – Allen	7 – Wells	3 – Faust	Comcast Center (17,950); College Park, MD
Mar 2; 1:00 pm, ACCN	at Clemson	L 73–77 ^{2OT}	15–14 (7–9)	20 – Allen	15 – Mitchell	3 – Wells	Littlejohn Coliseum (7,991); Clemson, SC
Mar 4; 8:00 pm, ACCN	Virginia Tech	W 64–47	16–14 (8–9)	13 – Layman	5 – Faust, Layman	6 – Allen	Comcast Center (10,517); College Park, MD
Mar 9; 12:00 pm, CBS	No. 5 Virginia	W 75–69 ^{OT}	17–14 (9–9)	20 – Allen	8 – Layman	3 – Smotrycz	Comcast Center (17,950); College Park, MD
ACC tournament
Mar 13; 12:00 pm, ESPNU/ACC Network	vs. Florida State; Second round	L 65–67	17–15	18 – Allen, Wells	6 – Layman	5 – Faust	Greensboro Coliseum (21,533); Greensboro, NC
*Non-conference game. ^{#}Rankings from AP Poll. (#) Tournament seedings in parentheses. All times are in Eastern Time.
