= 2013–14 Delaware State Hornets men's basketball team =

American college basketball season

2013–14 Delaware State Hornets men's basketball
- Conference: Mid-Eastern Athletic Conference
- Record: 9–21 (5–11 MEAC)
- Head coach: Greg Jackson/Keith Walker
- Assistant coaches: Mike Bernard; Keith Walker; Jarrell Wilkerson
- Home arena: Memorial Hall

2013–14 MEAC men's basketball standings
	Conf.				Overall
Team	W		L	PCT	W		L	PCT
North Carolina Central †	15	–	1	.938	28	–	6	.824
Hampton	13	–	3	.813	18	–	13	.581
Norfolk State	11	–	5	.688	19	–	15	.559
Morgan State	11	–	5	.688	15	–	16	.484
Savannah State	10	–	6	.625	13	–	19	.406
Florida A&M	8	–	8	.500	14	–	18	.438
Coppin State	7	–	9	.438	12	–	20	.375
Delaware State	5	–	11	.313	9	–	21	.300
South Carolina State	5	–	11	.313	9	–	21	.300
North Carolina A&T	5	–	11	.313	9	–	23	.281
Howard	5	–	11	.313	8	–	25	.242
Bethune–Cookman	5	–	11	.313	7	–	25	.219
Maryland Eastern Shore	4	–	12	.250	6	–	24	.200
† 2014 MEAC tournament winner

The 2013–14 Delaware State Hornets men's basketball team represented Delaware State University during the 2013–14 NCAA Division I men's basketball season. The Hornets, led by 14th year head coach Greg Jackson, played their home games at Memorial Hall and were members of the Mid-Eastern Athletic Conference. They finished the season 9–21, 5–11 in MEAC play to finish in a five way tie for eighth place. They lost in the first round of the MEAC tournament to Florida A&M.

On January 30, after starting the season 4–15, head coach Greg Jackson was fired. In 14 years he led the Hornets to 200 wins, one shy of the school record. The Hornets were led by interim head coach Keith Walker for the remainder of the season.

== Roster ==
Number	Name	Position	Height	Weight	Year	Hometown
0	Rakeen Brown	Guard	5–10	160	Freshman	Hampton, Virginia
1	Kendall Gray	Center	6–10	240	Junior	Dover, Delaware
2	Kendal Williams	Guard	6–0	160	Junior	Dover, Delaware
3	Scott Sill	Forward	6–9	215	Sophomore	Windsor, Connecticut
4	Cahli Thomas	Guard	6–1	180	Sophomore	Washington, D.C.
5	Tyshawn Bell	Forward	6–7	215	Junior	Dover, Delaware
10	Nike Doyle	Guard/Forward	6–4	195	Sophomore	Franklin, Virginia
11	DeAndre Haywood	Guard	6–2	200	Freshman	Paterson, New Jersey
13	Albert "A.J." Thomas	Guard	5–10	160	Senior	Fort Washington, Maryland
20	Mrdjan Gasevic	Forward/Center	6–7	235	Freshman	Mladenovac, Serbia
21	Larry Haley	Guard	6–3	190	Sophomore	Largo, Maryland
22	Casey Walker	Guard	6–5	175	Senior	Brodnax, Virginia
23	Jason Owens	Forward	6–6	232	Sophomore	Seaford, Delaware
30	Jordan Lawson	Guard	6–5	210	Senior	Durham, North Carolina
34	Chris Lewis	Guard	5–11	165	Sophomore	Willingboro Township, New Jersey
35	J Walter Lawson	Guard	6–0	165	Freshman	Newark, Delaware
45	Ashwell Boyd	Guard	6–4	180	Freshman	Arlington, Texas
55	Charles Burley	Guard	5–10	185	Junior	Wilmington, Delaware

== Schedule ==
Date time, TV	Opponent	Result	Record	Site (attendance) city, state
Regular season
11/09/2013*; 4:00 pm	Cairn	W 107–48	1–0	Memorial Hall (1,100); Dover, DE
11/11/2013*; 7:00 pm	at Georgia Tech	L 50–68	1–1	McCamish Pavilion (5,390); Atlanta, GA
11/13/2013*; 7:00 pm	at Clemson	L 37–58	1–2	Littlejohn Coliseum (5,000); Clemson, SC
11/19/2013*; 7:00 pm	at George Washington	L 50–94	1–3	Charles E. Smith Athletic Center (2,037); Washington, D.C.
11/25/2013*; 7:00 pm	Delaware	L 70–80	1–4	Memorial Hall (1,328); Dover, DE
11/30/2013*; 2:00 pm	at Buffalo	L 55–65	1–5	Alumni Arena (2,112); Amherst, NY
12/02/2013*; 7:00 pm	Baptist Bible	W 72–47	2–5	Memorial Hall (1,328); Dover, DE
12/04/2013*; 7:00 pm	at No. 25 Dayton	L 46–56	2–6	UD Arena (11,571); Dayton, OH
12/07/2013; 4:00 pm	Coppin State	L 54–73	2–7 (0–1)	Memorial Hall (1,206); Dover, DE
12/15/2013; 6:00 pm	vs. Howard	L 62–64 ^{OT}	2–8 (0–2)	Barclays Center (5,000); Brooklyn, NY
12/17/2013*; 8:00 pm	at No. 7 Oklahoma State	L 43–75	2–9	Gallagher-Iba Arena (8,579); Stillwater, OK
12/30/2013*; 4:00 pm	St. Francis Brooklyn	L 57–60	2–10	Memorial Hall (268); Dover, DE
01/02/2014*; 7:00 pm	Gardner–Webb	W 66–65 ^{OT}	3–10	Memorial Hall (182); Dover, DE
01/04/2014*; 7:00 pm	at Campbell	W 70–60	4–10	John W. Pope, Jr. Convocation Center (1,120); Buies Creek, NC
01/11/2014; 4:00 pm	Hampton	L 60–73	4–11 (0–3)	Memorial Hall (680); Dover, DE
01/13/2014; 7:30 pm	Norfolk State	L 56–58	4–12 (0–4)	Memorial Hall (1,365); Dover, DE
01/18/2014; 4:00 pm	at North Carolina Central	L 52–62	4–13 (0–5)	McLendon–McDougald Gymnasium (2,989); Durham, NC
01/20/2014; 8:00 pm, ESPNU	at North Carolina A&T	L 55–66	4–14 (0–6)	Corbett Sports Center (4,156); Greensboro, NC
01/27/2014*; 7:00 pm	NJIT	L 59–65 ^{OT}	4–15	Memorial Hall (1,007); Dover, DE
02/01/2014; 4:00 pm	at Morgan State	L 64–77	4–16 (0–7)	Talmadge L. Hill Field House (3,970); Baltimore, MD
02/03/2014; 7:30 pm	at Coppin State	L 53–54	4–17 (0–8)	Physical Education Complex (874); Baltimore, MD
02/08/2014; 4:00 pm	South Carolina State	W 61–53	5–17 (1–8)	Memorial Hall (483); Dover, DE
02/10/2014; 7:30 pm	Savannah State	W 79–59	6–17 (2–8)	Memorial Hall (479); Dover, DE
02/15/2014; 4:00 pm	at Bethune-Cookman	W 79–67	7–17 (3–8)	Moore Gymnasium (843); Daytona Beach, FL
02/17/2014; 7:30 pm	at Florida A&M	L 63–68	7–18 (3–9)	Teaching Gym (1,345); Tallahassee, FL
02/22/2014; 4:00 pm	Maryland Eastern Shore	W 84–71	8–18 (4–9)	Memorial Hall (1,307); Dover, DE
02/24/2014; 7:30 pm	Morgan State	W 59–56	9–18 (5–9)	Memorial Hall (1,036); Dover, DE
03/01/2014; 4:00 pm	Howard	L 53–55	9–19 (5–10)	Memorial Hall (1,056); Dover, DE
03/06/2014; 7:30 pm	at Maryland Eastern Shore	L 70–84	9–20 (5–11)	Hytche Athletic Center (4,405); Princess Anne, MD
MEAC tournament
03/11/2014; 9:00 pm	vs. Florida A&M; First round	L 61–65	9–21	Norfolk Scope (4,658); Norfolk, VA
*Non-conference game. ^{#}Rankings from AP Poll. (#) Tournament seedings in parentheses. All times are in Eastern Time.
