= 2013–14 Morgan State Bears basketball team =

American college basketball season

2013–14 Morgan State Bears men's basketball
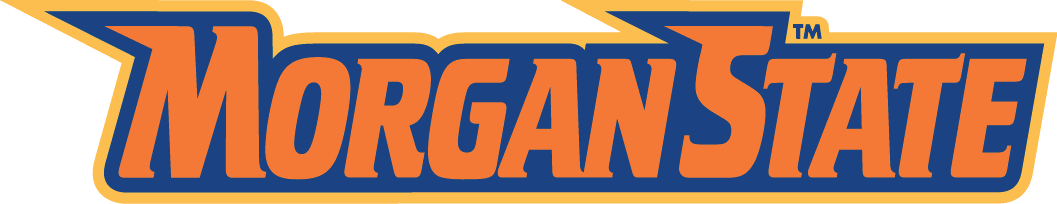
- Conference: Mid-Eastern Athletic Conference
- Record: 15–16 (11–5 MEAC)
- Head coach: Todd Bozeman (8th season)
- Assistant coaches: Kevin McClain; Keith Goodie; Glenroy Palmer
- Home arena: Talmadge L. Hill Field House

2013–14 MEAC men's basketball standings
| | Conf. | | | | Overall |
| Team | W | | L | PCT | W | | L | PCT |
|---|---|---|---|---|---|---|---|---|
| North Carolina Central † | 15 | – | 1 | .938 | 28 | – | 6 | .824 |
| Hampton | 13 | – | 3 | .813 | 18 | – | 13 | .581 |
| Norfolk State | 11 | – | 5 | .688 | 19 | – | 15 | .559 |
| Morgan State | 11 | – | 5 | .688 | 15 | – | 16 | .484 |
| Savannah State | 10 | – | 6 | .625 | 13 | – | 19 | .406 |
| Florida A&M | 8 | – | 8 | .500 | 14 | – | 18 | .438 |
| Coppin State | 7 | – | 9 | .438 | 12 | – | 20 | .375 |
| Delaware State | 5 | – | 11 | .313 | 9 | – | 21 | .300 |
| South Carolina State | 5 | – | 11 | .313 | 9 | – | 21 | .300 |
| North Carolina A&T | 5 | – | 11 | .313 | 9 | – | 23 | .281 |
| Howard | 5 | – | 11 | .313 | 8 | – | 25 | .242 |
| Bethune–Cookman | 5 | – | 11 | .313 | 7 | – | 25 | .219 |
| Maryland Eastern Shore | 4 | – | 12 | .250 | 6 | – | 24 | .200 |
† 2014 MEAC tournament winner

The 2013–14 Morgan State Bears men's basketball team represented Morgan State University during the 2013–14 NCAA Division I men's basketball season. The Bears, led by eighth year head coach Todd Bozeman, played their home games at the Talmadge L. Hill Field House and were members of the Mid-Eastern Athletic Conference. They finished the season 15–16, 11–5 in MEAC play to finish in a tie for third place. They advanced to the championship game of the MEAC tournament where they lost to North Carolina Central.

== Roster ==
| Number | Name | Position | Height | Weight | Year | Hometown |
|---|---|---|---|---|---|---|
| 1 | Donte Pretlow | Guard | 6–0 | 185 | Sophomore | Baltimore, Maryland |
| 2 | Torin Childs-Harris | Guard | 6–4 | 185 | Freshman | New London, Connecticut |
| 3 | Rasean Simpson | Guard | 6–5 | 190 | Sophomore | San Diego, California |
| 5 | Justin Black | Guard | 6–2 | 220 | Senior | St. Louis, Missouri |
| 10 | Emmanuel Matey | Guard | 5–11 | 190 | Freshman | Greenbelt, Maryland |
| 11 | Anthony Hubbard | Guard | 6–5 | 230 | Senior | Woodbridge, Virginia |
| 12 | Thair Heath | Forward | 6–9 | 230 | Senior | Los Angeles, California |
| 21 | Kyle Thomas | Forward | 6–6 | 200 | Freshman | Owings Mills, Maryland |
| 22 | Blake Bozeman | Guard | 6–2 | 170 | Junior | Bowie, Maryland |
| 33 | Hassante Manning | Forward | 6–8 | 240 | Junior | Los Angeles, California |
| 34 | Cedric Blossom | Forward | 6–6 | 225 | Sophomore | Columbia, Maryland |
| 42 | Willis Turnipseed | Forward | 6–9 | 190 | Sophomore | Baltimore, Maryland |
| 44 | Shaquille Duncan | Forward | 6–9 | 208 | Junior | Philadelphia, Pennsylvania |
| 50 | Ian Chiles | Center | 7–2 | 260 | Senior | Cliffside Park, New Jersey |

== Schedule ==
| Date time, TV | Opponent | Result | Record | Site (attendance) city, state |
Regular season
| 11/09/2013*; 12:00 pm | at No. 11 Ohio State | L 50–89 | 0–1 | Nationwide Arena (16,777); Columbus, OH |
| 11/12/2013*; 7:30 pm | at Towson | L 75–95 | 0–2 | SECU Arena (2,874); Towson, MD |
| 11/14/2013*; 7:00 pm | San Diego | L 73–74 | 0–3 | Talmadge L. Hill Field House (1,145); Baltimore, MD |
| 11/20/2013*; 7:30 pm | Ohio | L 62–65 | 0–4 | Talmadge L. Hill Field House (2,108); Baltimore, MD |
| 11/22/2013*; 10:00 pm, CBSSN | vs. La Salle; Paradise Jam Tournament | L 59–78 | 0–5 | Sports and Fitness Center (2,275); Saint Thomas, USVI |
| 11/23/2013*; 2:30 pm, CBSSN | vs. Vanderbilt; Paradise Jam Tournament | L 66–75 | 0–6 | Sports and Fitness Center (1,323); Saint Thomas, USVI |
| 11/25/2013*; 2:30 pm, CBSSN | vs. Marist; Paradise Jam Tournament | W 74–67 ^{OT} | 1–6 | Sports and Fitness Center (1,222); Saint Thomas, USVI |
| 11/29/2013*; 6:00 pm | at Maryland | L 62–89 ^{OT} | 1–7 | Comcast Center (9,517); College Park, MD |
| 12/07/2013; 4:00 pm | Howard | W 87–58 | 2–7 (1–0) | Talmadge L. Hill Field House (1,008); Baltimore, MD |
| 12/18/2013*; 7:30 pm | High Point | W 85–74 | 3–7 | Talmadge L. Hill Field House (757); Baltimore, MD |
| 12/27/2013*; 10:00 pm | at Cal State Northridge | L 80–86 | 3–8 | Matadome (430); Northridge, CA |
| 12/29/2013*; 3:00 pm, P12N | at No. 12 Oregon | L 76–97 | 3–9 | Matthew Knight Arena (6,586); Eugene, OR |
| 01/02/2014*; 10:30 pm | at UC Irvine | L 63–75 | 3–10 | Bren Events Center (1,657); Irvine, CA |
| 01/11/2014; 4:00 pm | South Carolina State | W 73–56 | 4–10 (2–0) | Talmadge L. Hill Field House (N/A); Baltimore, MD |
| 01/18/2014; 6:00 pm | at Norfolk State | W 87–70 | 5–10 (3–0) | Joseph G. Echols Memorial Hall (3,382); Norfolk, VA |
| 01/20/2014; 8:00 pm | at Hampton | W 80–71 | 6–10 (4–0) | Hampton Convocation Center (5,291); Hampton, VA |
| 01/25/2014; 6:00 pm | at North Carolina A&T | L 67–68 ^{OT} | 6–11 (4–1) | Corbett Sports Center (1,978); Greensboro, NC |
| 01/27/2014; 7:30 pm | at North Carolina Central | L 52–53 | 6–12 (4–2) | McLendon–McDougald Gymnasium (1,610); Durham, NC |
| 02/01/2014; 4:00 pm | Delaware State | W 77–64 | 7–12 (5–2) | Talmadge L. Hill Field House (3,970); Baltimore, MD |
| 02/03/2014; 7:30 pm | Hampton | W 94–92 ^{2OT} | 8–12 (6–2) | Talmadge L. Hill Field House (3,579); Baltimore, MD |
| 02/08/2014; 4:00 pm | Norfolk State | L 53–64 | 8–13 (6–3) | Talmadge L. Hill Field House (3,284); Baltimore, MD |
| 02/10/2014; 7:30 pm | at Coppin State | W 82–77 | 9–13 (7–3) | Physical Education Complex (3,103); Baltimore, MD |
| 02/17/2014; 7:30 pm | at Maryland Eastern Shore | W 88–72 | 10–13 (8–3) | Hytche Athletic Center (1,454); Princess Anne, MD |
| 02/19/2014; 7:30 pm | Coppin State | W 78–69 | 11–13 (9–3) | Talmadge L. Hill Field House (4,500); Baltimore, MD |
| 02/24/2014; 7:00 pm | at Delaware State | L 56–59 | 11–14 (9–4) | Memorial Hall (1,036); Dover, DE |
| 03/01/2014; 4:00 pm | Bethune-Cookman | W 65–61 | 12–14 (10–4) | Talmadge L. Hill Field House (2,056); Baltimore, MD |
| 03/03/2014; 7:30 pm | Florida A&M | L 73–78 | 12–15 (10–5) | Talmadge L. Hill Field House (1,009); Baltimore, MD |
| 03/06/2014; 8:00 pm | at Howard | W 68–66 ^{OT} | 13–15 (11–5) | Burr Gymnasium (N/A); Washington, D.C. |
MEAC tournament
| 03/13/2014; 6:00 pm | vs. Florida A&M; Quarterfinals | W 81–68 | 14–15 | Norfolk Scope (N/A); Norfolk, VA |
| 03/14/2014; 8:00 pm | vs. Coppin State; Semifinals | W 79–64 | 15–15 | Norfolk Scope (8,608); Norfolk, VA |
| 03/15/2014; 6:00 pm, ESPNU | vs. North Carolina Central; Championship | L 62–71 | 15–16 | Norfolk Scope (N/A); Norfolk, VA |
*Non-conference game. ^{#}Rankings from AP Poll. (#) Tournament seedings in parentheses. All times are in Eastern Time.
