= 2013–14 Howard Bison men's basketball team =

American college basketball season

2013–14 Howard Bison men's basketball
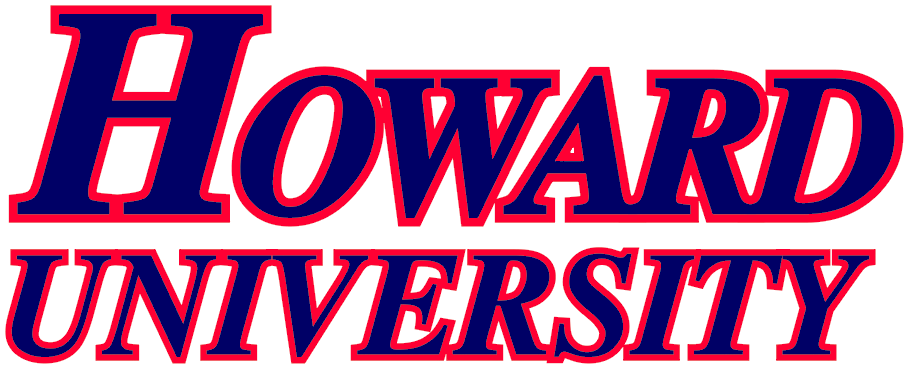
- Conference: Mid-Eastern Athletic Conference
- Record: 8–25 (5–11 MEAC)
- Head coach: Kevin Nickelberry (4th season)
- Assistant coaches: Keith Coutreyer; Travis Lyons; Victor Montgomery
- Home arena: Burr Gymnasium

2013–14 MEAC men's basketball standings
	Conf.				Overall
Team	W		L	PCT	W		L	PCT
North Carolina Central †	15	–	1	.938	28	–	6	.824
Hampton	13	–	3	.813	18	–	13	.581
Norfolk State	11	–	5	.688	19	–	15	.559
Morgan State	11	–	5	.688	15	–	16	.484
Savannah State	10	–	6	.625	13	–	19	.406
Florida A&M	8	–	8	.500	14	–	18	.438
Coppin State	7	–	9	.438	12	–	20	.375
Delaware State	5	–	11	.313	9	–	21	.300
South Carolina State	5	–	11	.313	9	–	21	.300
North Carolina A&T	5	–	11	.313	9	–	23	.281
Howard	5	–	11	.313	8	–	25	.242
Bethune–Cookman	5	–	11	.313	7	–	25	.219
Maryland Eastern Shore	4	–	12	.250	6	–	24	.200
† 2014 MEAC tournament winner

The 2013–14 Howard Bison men's basketball team represented Howard University during the 2013–14 NCAA Division I men's basketball season. The Bison, led by fourth-year head coach Kevin Nickelberry, played their home games at the Burr Gymnasium and were members of the Mid-Eastern Athletic Conference. They finished the season 8–25, 5–11 in MEAC play to finish in a five-way tie for eighth place. They advanced to the quarterfinals of the MEAC tournament, where they lost to North Carolina Central.

== Roster ==
Number	Name	Position	Height	Weight	Year	Hometown
0	Emmanuel Okoro II	Center/forward	6–6	220	Junior	Houston, Texas
1	James Carlton	Guard	6–8	220	Senior	Durham, North Carolina
2	Kofi Andoh	Guard	6–4	185	Freshman	Largo, Maryland
3	Prince Okoroh	Guard/forward	6–5	220	Junior	Greenbelt, Maryland
4	Ausar Madison	Guard	5–9	150	Freshman	Carson, California
5	Marcel Boyd	Center	6–10	230	Freshman	Accokeek, Maryland
10	Keon Hill	Guard	5–9	170	Freshman	Largo, Maryland
11	James Daniel III	Guard	5–11	165	Freshman	Hampton, Virginia
15	Damon Collins	Guard/forward	6–5	180	Freshman	Dallas, Texas
20	Solomon Mangham	Forward/center	6–7	210	Freshman	Atlanta, Georgia
21	Jared Norsworthy	Guard	6–2	170	Junior	La Cañada, California
22	Brandon Ford	Guard	6–2	195	Junior	Largo, Maryland
25	Theodore Boyomo	Center	6–8	230	Senior	Cameroon
32	Tyler Stone	Forward	6–7	205	Freshman	Toronto, Ontario
33	James Miller	Guard/forward	6–4	185	Freshman	Clinton, North Carolina
44	Oliver Ellison	Center	6–9	216	Sophomore	Washington, D.C.

== Schedule ==
Date time, TV	Opponent	Result	Record	Site (attendance) city, state
Regular season
11/08/2013*; 7:00 pm, no	Washington College	W 69–52	1–0	Burr Gymnasium (1,875); Washington, D.C.
11/10/2013*; 5:00 pm, no	Gwynedd Mercy	W 83–66	2–0	Burr Gymnasium (N/A); Washington, D.C.
11/13/2013*; 7:00 pm, no	at Old Dominion	L 57–77	2–1	Constant Center (6,102); Norfolk, VA
11/15/2013*; 7:00 pm, no	at Harvard	L 44–76	2–2	Lavietes Pavilion (1,815); Cambridge, MA
11/17/2013*; 5:00 pm, no	at Pittsburgh; Legends Classic	L 52–84	2–3	Petersen Events Center (8,349); Pittsburgh, PA
11/21/2013*; 7:30 pm, no	at Houston; Legends Classic	L 62–75	2–4	Hofheinz Pavilion (2,815); Houston, TX
11/25/2013*; 9:00 pm, no	at South Dakota State; Legends Classic	L 65–77	2–5	Frost Arena (1,910); Brookings, SD
11/26/2013*; 6:30 pm, no	vs. Texas Southern; Legends Classic	L 54–63	2–6	Frost Arena (1,696); Brookings, SD
11/30/2013*; 5:00 pm, no	William & Mary	L 79–84 ^{OT}	2–7	Burr Gymnasium (752); Washington, D.C.
12/04/2013*; 7:30 pm, no	at American	L 53–76	2–8	Bender Arena (802); Washington, D.C.
12/07/2013; 4:00 pm, no	at Morgan State	L 58–87	2–9 (0–1)	Talmadge L. Hill Field House (1,008); Baltimore, MD
12/11/2013*; 7:00 pm, no	at UCF	L 64–79	2–10	CFE Arena (3,975); Orlando, FL
12/14/2013*; 2:00 pm, no	at Fordham	L 60–79	2–11	Rose Hill Gymnasium (1,432); The Bronx, NY
12/15/2013; 6:00 pm, no	vs. Delaware State	W 64–62 ^{OT}	3–11 (1–1)	Barclays Center (5,000); Brooklyn, NY
12/17/2013*; 7:00 pm, no	at Liberty	L 59–77	3–12	Vines Center (1,100); Lynchburg, VA
12/29/2013*; 4:00 pm, no	at USC	L 60–82	3–13	Galen Center (5,563); Los Angeles, CA
01/04/2014*; 4:00 pm, no	at College of Charleston	L 50–60	3–14	TD Arena (3,783); Charleston, SC
01/13/2014; 7:30 pm, no	Savannah State	L 54–56	3–15 (1–2)	Burr Gymnasium (2,750); Washington, D.C.
01/18/2014; 4:00 pm, no	Maryland Eastern Shore	W 88–55	4–15 (2–2)	Burr Gymnasium (787); Washington, D.C.
01/25/2014; 6:00 pm, no	at Florida A&M	W 69–62	5–15 (3–2)	Teaching Gym (2,577); Tallahassee, FL
01/27/2014; 7:30 pm, no	at Bethune-Cookman	L 47–58	5–16 (3–3)	Moore Gymnasium (1,216); Daytona Beach, FL
02/01/2014; 4:00 pm, no	North Carolina Central	L 65–79	5–17 (3–4)	Burr Gymnasium (2,500); Washington, D.C.
02/03/2014; 7:30 pm, no	North Carolina A&T	W 68–60	6–17 (4–4)	Burr Gymnasium (1,023); Washington, D.C.
02/08/2014; 7:30 pm, no	at Hampton	L 47–63	6–18 (4–5)	Hampton Convocation Center (6,000); Hampton, VA
02/10/2014; 7:30 pm, no	at Norfolk State	L 49–75	6–19 (4–6)	Joseph G. Echols Memorial Hall (1,226); Norfolk, VA
02/15/2014; 4:00 pm, no	at Maryland Eastern Shore	L 73–87	6–20 (4–7)	Hytche Athletic Center (3,818); Princess Anne, MD
02/22/2014; 7:00 pm, no	Hampton	L 78–81	6–21 (4–8)	Burr Gymnasium (1,706); Washington, D.C.
02/24/2014; 7:30 pm, no	Norfolk State	L 60–66	6–22 (4–9)	Burr Gymnasium (1,113); Washington, D.C.
03/01/2014; 6:00 pm, no	at Delaware State	W 55–53	7–22 (5–9)	Memorial Hall (1,056); Dover, DE
03/03/2014; 7:30 pm, no	at Coppin State	L 69–86	7–23 (5–10)	Physical Education Complex (543); Baltimore, MD
03/06/2014; 8:00 pm, no	Morgan State	L 66–68 ^{OT}	7–24 (5–11)	Burr Gymnasium (N/A); Washington, D.C.
2014 MEAC tournament
03/11/2014; 4:00 pm, no	vs. North Carolina A&T; First round	W 53–47	8–24	Norfolk Scope (4,658); Norfolk, VA
03/12/2014; 6:00 pm, no	vs. North Carolina Central; Quarterfinals	L 46–92	8–25	Norfolk Scope (6,663); Norfolk, VA
*Non-conference game. ^{#}Rankings from AP Poll. (#) Tournament seedings in parentheses. All times are in Eastern Time.
