= 2013–14 Hampton Pirates basketball team =

American college basketball season

2013–14 Hampton Pirates men's basketball
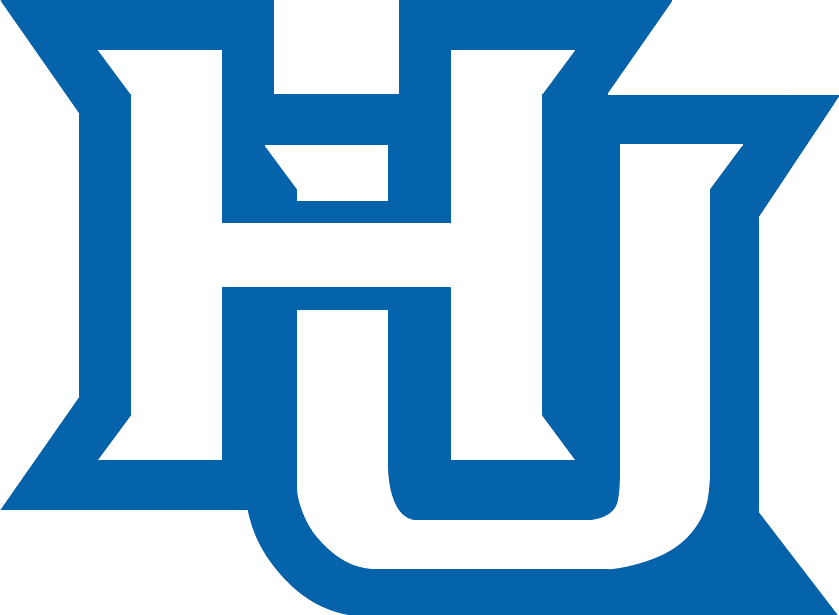

CBI First round vs. Penn State, L 65–69
- Conference: Mid-Eastern Athletic Conference
- Record: 18–13 (13–3 MEAC)
- Head coach: Edward Joyner (5th season)
- Assistant coaches: Darryl Sharp; Akeem Miskdeen; DeMarco Johnson
- Home arena: Hampton Convocation Center

2013–14 MEAC men's basketball standings
	Conf.				Overall
Team	W		L	PCT	W		L	PCT
North Carolina Central †	15	–	1	.938	28	–	6	.824
Hampton	13	–	3	.813	18	–	13	.581
Norfolk State	11	–	5	.688	19	–	15	.559
Morgan State	11	–	5	.688	15	–	16	.484
Savannah State	10	–	6	.625	13	–	19	.406
Florida A&M	8	–	8	.500	14	–	18	.438
Coppin State	7	–	9	.438	12	–	20	.375
Delaware State	5	–	11	.313	9	–	21	.300
South Carolina State	5	–	11	.313	9	–	21	.300
North Carolina A&T	5	–	11	.313	9	–	23	.281
Howard	5	–	11	.313	8	–	25	.242
Bethune–Cookman	5	–	11	.313	7	–	25	.219
Maryland Eastern Shore	4	–	12	.250	6	–	24	.200
† 2014 MEAC tournament winner

The 2013–14 Hampton Pirates men's basketball team represented Hampton University during the 2013–14 NCAA Division I men's basketball season. The Pirates, led by fifth year head coach Edward Joyner, played their home games at the Hampton Convocation Center and were members of the Mid-Eastern Athletic Conference. They finished the season 18–13, 13–3 in MEAC play to finish in second place. They lost in the quarterfinals of the MEAC tournament to Coppin State. They were invited to the College Basketball Invitational where they lost in the first round to Penn State.

== Roster ==
Number	Name	Position	Height	Weight	Year	Hometown
4	Lawrence Cooks	Guard	6–1	175	Freshman	Charlotte, North Carolina
5	Emmanuel Okoroba	Center	6–8	225	Junior	Garland, Texas
11	Deron Powers	Guard	5–11	165	Sophomore	Williamsburg, Virginia
13	Gregory Hayden	Guard	5–7	160	Freshman	Dallas, Texas
14	Brian Darden	Guard	6–2	183	Sophomore	Hampton, Virginia
20	Du'Vaughn Maxwell	Forward	6–7	215	Senior	Manhattan, New York
21	Ke'Ron Brown	Guard	6–3	215	Sophomore	Savannah, Georgia
22	Miles Jackson	Guard/Forward	6–5	200	Sophomore	Silver Spring, Maryland
23	Dwight Meikle	Guard	6–7	210	Sophomore	Jonesboro, Georgia
24	Ramon Mercado	Guard	6–4	205	Senior	Hollywood, Florida
25	Reggie Price	Guard	6–3	195	Sophomore	Charlotte, North Carolina
32	Dionte Adams	Forward	6–7	215	Sophomore	Charlotte, North Carolina
33	Phillip Reed	Center	6–10	210	Freshman	Oxnard, California

== Schedule ==
Date time, TV	Opponent	Result	Record	Site (attendance) city, state
Regular season
11/08/2013*; 7:00 pm	William & Mary	W 77–69	1–0	Hampton Convocation Center (4,824); Hampton, VA
11/12/2013*; 7:00 pm	at Saint Peter's	W 64–59	2–0	Yanitelli Center (516); Jersey City, NJ
11/17/2013*; 2:00 pm	Delaware	L 79–90	2–1	Hampton Convocation Center (1,287); Hampton, VA
11/20/2013*; 7:00 pm	at Quinnipiac	L 68–71	2–2	TD Bank Sports Center (1,009); Hamden, CT
11/24/2013*; 3:00 pm	at Missouri State; Corpus Christi Challenge	L 67–81	2–3	JQH Arena (3,988); Springfield, MO
11/26/2013*; 7:00 pm	at Virginia; Corpus Christi Challenge	L 40–69	2–4	John Paul Jones Arena (8,970); Charlottesville, VA
11/29/2013*; 2:00 pm	vs. Liberty; Corpus Christi Challenge	L 53–70	2–5	American Bank Center (N/A); Corpus Christi, TX
11/30/2013*; 1:00 pm	vs. Arkansas–Pine Bluff; Corpus Christi Challenge	W 72–65	3–5	American Bank Center (N/A); Corpus Christi, TX
12/07/2013; 6:00 pm	Florida A&M	W 72–62	4–5 (1–0)	Hampton Convocation Center (1,572); Hampton, VA
12/09/2013; 8:00 pm	Bethune-Cookman	W 85–52	5–5 (2–0)	Hampton Convocation Center (1,428); Hampton, VA
12/18/2013*; 7:00 pm	at Northern Kentucky	L 67–69 ^{OT}	5–6	The Bank of Kentucky Center (1,092); Highland Heights, KY
12/21/2013*; 3:00 pm, NBCSN	vs. James Madison; Governor's Holiday Hoops Classic	L 49–55	5–7	Richmond Coliseum (10,605); Richmond, VA
12/29/2013*; 2:00 pm	Winthrop	W 101–95 ^{2OT}	6–7	Hampton Convocation Center (861); Hampton, VA
01/04/2014*; 4:00 pm	Radford	W 87–60	7–7	Hampton Convocation Center (651); Hampton, VA
01/07/2014; 7:00 pm	at North Carolina Central	L 61–74	7–8	McLendon–McDougald Gymnasium (1,114); Durham, NC
01/11/2014; 4:00 pm	at Delaware State	W 73–60	8–8 (3–0)	Memorial Hall (680); Dover, DE
01/18/2014; 6:00 pm	Coppin State	L 68–71	8–9 (3–1)	Hampton Convocation Center (4,981); Hampton, VA
01/20/2014; 8:00 pm	Morgan State	L 71–80	8–10 (3–2)	Hampton Convocation Center (5,291); Hampton, VA
01/25/2014; 6:00 pm	at Savannah State	W 80–71	9–10 (4–2)	Tiger Arena (2,010); Savannah, GA
01/27/2014; 7:30 pm	at South Carolina State	W 67–56	10–10 (5–2)	SHM Memorial Center (806); Orangeburg, SC
02/01/2014; 4:00 pm	at Coppin State	W 79–76 ^{OT}	11–10 (6–2)	Physical Education Complex (728); Baltimore, MD
02/03/2014; 7:30 pm	at Morgan State	L 92–94 ^{2OT}	11–11 (6–3)	Talmadge L. Hill Field House (3,579); Baltimore, MD
02/08/2014; 6:00 pm	Howard	W 63–47	12–11 (7–3)	Hampton Convocation Center (6,000); Hampton, VA
02/10/2014; 8:00 pm	Maryland Eastern Shore	W 71–65	13–11 (8–3)	Hampton Convocation Center (2,521); Hampton, VA
02/15/2014; 6:00 pm	at Norfolk State	W 79–73 ^{OT}	14–11 (9–3)	Joseph G. Echols Memorial Hall (5,653); Norfolk, VA
02/22/2014; 4:00 pm	at Howard	W 81–78	15–11 (10–3)	Burr Gymnasium (1,706); Washington, D.C.
02/24/2014; 7:30 pm	at Maryland Eastern Shore	W 104–89	16–11 (11–3)	Hytche Athletic Center (1,038); Princess Anne, MD
03/01/2014; 6:00 pm	Norfolk State	W 61–53	17–11 (12–3)	Hampton Convocation Center (7,128); Hampton, VA
03/06/2014; 8:00 pm	North Carolina A&T	W 89–71	18–11 (13–3)	Hampton Convocation Center (4,843); Hampton, VA
MEAC tournament
03/12/2014; 8:00 pm	vs. Coppin State; Quarterfinals	L 77–83	18–12	Norfolk Scope (6,663); Norfolk, VA
CBI
03/19/2014*; 7:00 pm	at Penn State; First round	L 65–69	18–13	Bryce Jordan Center (2,118); University Park, PA
*Non-conference game. ^{#}Rankings from AP Poll. (#) Tournament seedings in parentheses. All times are in Eastern Time.
