= 2013–14 North Carolina Central Eagles men's basketball team =

American college basketball season

2013–14 North Carolina Central Eagles men's basketball

MEAC Regular Season and tournament champions

NCAA tournament, round of 64
- Conference: Mid-Eastern Athletic Conference
- Record: 28–6 (15–1 MEAC)
- Head coach: LeVelle Moton (5th season)
- Assistant coaches: John Moseley; Brian Burg; Michael Cotton
- Home arena: McLendon–McDougald Gymnasium

2013–14 MEAC men's basketball standings
	Conf.				Overall
Team	W		L	PCT	W		L	PCT
North Carolina Central †	15	–	1	.938	28	–	6	.824
Hampton	13	–	3	.813	18	–	13	.581
Norfolk State	11	–	5	.688	19	–	15	.559
Morgan State	11	–	5	.688	15	–	16	.484
Savannah State	10	–	6	.625	13	–	19	.406
Florida A&M	8	–	8	.500	14	–	18	.438
Coppin State	7	–	9	.438	12	–	20	.375
Delaware State	5	–	11	.313	9	–	21	.300
South Carolina State	5	–	11	.313	9	–	21	.300
North Carolina A&T	5	–	11	.313	9	–	23	.281
Howard	5	–	11	.313	8	–	25	.242
Bethune–Cookman	5	–	11	.313	7	–	25	.219
Maryland Eastern Shore	4	–	12	.250	6	–	24	.200
† 2014 MEAC tournament winner

The 2013–14 North Carolina Central Eagles men's basketball team represented North Carolina Central University during the 2013–14 NCAA Division I men's basketball season. The Eagles, led by fifth year head coach LeVelle Moton, played their home games at the McLendon–McDougald Gymnasium and were members of the Mid-Eastern Athletic Conference. They finished the season 28–6, 15–1 in MEAC play to win the MEAC regular season championship. They were also champions of the MEAC tournament to earn an automatic bid to the NCAA tournament, their first NCAA bid in school history, where they lost in the second round to Iowa State.

== Roster ==
Number	Name	Position	Height	Weight	Year	Hometown
0	Dante Holmes	Guard	6–3	190	Sophomore	Baltimore, Maryland
1	Jay Copeland Jr.	Forward	6–7	255	Junior	Suffolk, Virginia
2	Jordan Parks	Guard	6–7	200	Junior	Queens, New York
3	Juwan Moody	Guard	6–1	175	Freshman	Pontiac, Michigan
4	Kevin Crawford II	Guard	6–1	150	Freshman	Blythewood, South Carolina
5	Ebuka Anyaorah	Guard	6–4	194	Senior	Suwanee, Georgia
10	Karamo Jawara	Forward	6–8	220	Junior	Bergen, Norway
11	Enoch Hood	Forward	6–9	215	Junior	Norfolk, Virginia
12	Antonin Galaya	Guard	6–5	200	Senior	Saint Martin, France
13	Reggie Groves	Guard	6–2	190	Senior	Raleigh, North Carolina
14	Jeremy Ingram	Guard	6–3	175	Senior	Charlotte, North Carolina
20	Jamal Ferguson	Guard	6–5	180	Sophomore	Norfolk, Virginia
23	Nate Mxey	Center	6–11	225	Junior	San Jose, California
24	Ramon Eaton	Forward	6–8	225	Junior	Sacramento, California
32	Emanuel Chapman	Guard	6–1	160	Senior	Raleigh, North Carolina
40	Alfonzo Houston	Guard	6–3	190	Senior	Cleveland Heights, Ohio

== Schedule ==
Date time, TV	Rank^{#}	Opponent^{#}	Result	Record	Site (attendance) city, state
Regular season
11/08/2013*; 8:00 pm		at Cincinnati; Global Sports Hoops Shootout	L 61–74	0–1	Fifth Third Arena (6,534); Cincinnati, OH
11/11/2013*; 7:00 pm		Johnson & Wales	W 98–47	1–1	McLendon–McDougald Gymnasium (1,332); Durham, NC
11/18/2013*; 7:00 pm		at Campbell; Global Sports Hoops Shootout	W 62–43	2–1	John W. Pope, Jr. Convocation Center (2,110); Buies Creek, NC
11/20/2013*; 7:00 pm		at NC State; Global Sports Hoops Shootout	W 82–72 ^{OT}	3–1	PNC Arena (9,754); Raleigh, NC
11/22/2013*; 7:00 pm		Appalachian State; Global Sports Hoops Shootout	W 76–70 ^{OT}	4–1	McLendon–McDougald Gymnasium (2,482); Durham, NC
11/26/2013*; 7:00 pm		Barber–Scotia	W 101–46	5–1	McLendon–McDougald Gymnasium (613); Durham, NC
12/03/2013*; 7:00 pm		at Old Dominion	W 76–69 ^{OT}	6–1	Ted Constant Convocation Center (5,189); Norfolk, VA
12/07/2013*; 3:00 pm		at IUPUI	L 65–71	6–2	The Jungle (675); Indianapolis, IN
12/18/2013*; 7:00 pm		Winthrop	W 72–66	7–2	McLendon–McDougald Gymnasium (925); Durham, NC
12/22/2013*; 8:00 pm		at No. 11 Wichita State	L 66–77	7–3	Charles Koch Arena (10,506); Wichita, KS
12/31/2013*; 2:00 pm, ESPN3		at Maryland	L 56–70	7–4	Comcast Center (9,554); College Park, MD
01/04/2014*; 1:00 pm		at Wagner			Spiro Sports Center; Staten Island, NY
01/07/2014*; 7:00 pm		Hampton	W 74–61	8–4	McLendon–McDougald Gymnasium (1,114); Durham, NC
01/11/2014; 6:00 pm		at Florida A&M	L 60–63	8–5 (0–1)	Teaching Gym (779); Tallahassee, FL
01/13/2014; 7:30 pm		at Bethune-Cookman	W 64–49	9–5 (1–1)	Moore Gymnasium (1,210); Daytona Beach, FL
01/16/2014*; 7:00 pm		NJIT	W 71–55	10–5	McLendon–McDougald Gymnasium (2,114); Durham, NC
01/18/2014; 4:00 pm		Delaware State	W 62–52	11–5 (2–1)	McLendon–McDougald Gymnasium (2,989); Durham, NC
01/22/2014; 7:30 pm		North Carolina A&T	W 84–44	12–5 (3–1)	McLendon–McDougald Gymnasium (3,116); Durham, NC
01/25/2014; 4:00 pm		Coppin State	W 87–63	13–5 (4–1)	McLendon–McDougald Gymnasium (1,618); Durham, NC
01/27/2014; 7:30 pm		Morgan State	W 53–52	14–5 (5–1)	McLendon–McDougald Gymnasium (1,610); Durham, NC
02/01/2014; 4:00 pm		at Howard	W 79–65	15–5 (6–1)	Burr Gymnasium (2,500); Washington, D.C.
02/03/2014; 7:30 pm		at Maryland Eastern Shore	W 66–62	16–5 (7–1)	Hytche Athletic Center (1,971); Princess Anne, MD
02/08/2014; 4:00 pm		Bethune-Cookman	W 77–54	17–5 (8–1)	McLendon–McDougald Gymnasium (2,420); Durham, NC
02/10/2014; 7:30 pm		Florida A&M	W 92–49	18–5 (9–1)	McLendon–McDougald Gymnasium (2,397); Durham, NC
02/15/2014; 6:00 pm		at South Carolina State	W 67–53	19–5 (10–1)	SHM Memorial Center (566); Orangeburg, SC
02/17/2014; 6:00 pm		at Savannah State	W 76–62	20–5 (11–1)	Tiger Arena (1,230); Savannah, GA
02/22/2014; 6:00 pm		at North Carolina A&T	W 73–55	21–5 (12–1)	Corbett Sports Center (5,700); Greensboro, NC
02/25/2014*; 7:00 pm		at NJIT	W 81–62	22–5	Fleisher Center (1,115); Newark, NJ
03/01/2014; 4:00 pm		South Carolina State	W 86–44	23–5 (13–1)	McLendon–McDougald Gymnasium (2,414); Durham, NC
03/03/2014; 7:30 pm		Savannah State	W 64–57 ^{OT}	24–5 (14–1)	McLendon–McDougald Gymnasium (2,732); Durham, NC
03/06/2014; 8:00 pm		at Norfolk State	W 76–70	25–5 (15–1)	Joseph G. Echols Memorial Hall (1,309); Norfolk, VA
MEAC tournament
03/12/2014; 6:00 pm		vs. Howard; Quarterfinals	W 92–46	26–5	Norfolk Scope (6,663); Norfolk, VA
03/14/2014; 6:00 pm		vs. Norfolk State; Semifinals	W 68–45	27–5	Norfolk Scope (8,608); Norfolk, VA
03/15/2014; 6:00 pm, ESPNU		vs. Morgan State; Championship	W 71–62	28–5	Norfolk Scope (N/A); Norfolk, VA
NCAA tournament
03/21/2014*; 9:50 pm, TNT	No. (14 E)	vs. No. 9 (3 E) Iowa State; Second round	L 75–93	28–6	AT&T Center (11,690); San Antonio, TX
*Non-conference game. ^{#}Rankings from AP Poll. (#) Tournament seedings in parentheses. All times are in Eastern Time. (#) during NCAA Tournament is seed within region E=East.

* Due to inclement weather in the Northeast, the January 4 game vs. Wagner was canceled.
