= 2014 MEAC men's basketball tournament =

- Classification: Division I
- Season: 2013–14
- Teams: 13
- Site: Norfolk Scope; Norfolk, Virginia
- Champions: North Carolina Central (1st title)
- Winning coach: LeVelle Moton (1st title)
- MVP: Jeremy Ingram (North Carolina Central)
- Television: ESPNU

2013–14 MEAC men's basketball standings
	Conf.				Overall
Team	W		L	PCT	W		L	PCT
North Carolina Central †	15	–	1	.938	28	–	6	.824
Hampton	13	–	3	.813	18	–	13	.581
Norfolk State	11	–	5	.688	19	–	15	.559
Morgan State	11	–	5	.688	15	–	16	.484
Savannah State	10	–	6	.625	13	–	19	.406
Florida A&M	8	–	8	.500	14	–	18	.438
Coppin State	7	–	9	.438	12	–	20	.375
Delaware State	5	–	11	.313	9	–	21	.300
South Carolina State	5	–	11	.313	9	–	21	.300
North Carolina A&T	5	–	11	.313	9	–	23	.281
Howard	5	–	11	.313	8	–	25	.242
Bethune–Cookman	5	–	11	.313	7	–	25	.219
Maryland Eastern Shore	4	–	12	.250	6	–	24	.200
† 2014 MEAC tournament winner

The 2014 Mid-Eastern Athletic Conference men's basketball tournament took place March 10–15, 2014 at the Norfolk Scope in Norfolk, Virginia. 2014 was the second year in Norfolk after the last eight years in Winston-Salem, North Carolina. First round games were played March 10 and March 11, with the quarterfinal games played on March 12 and 13. The semifinals was held March 14, with the championship game on March 15.

== Seeds ==
Seed	School	Conference	Overall
1	North Carolina Central‡†	15–1	25–5
2	Hampton†	13–3	18–11
3	Morgan State†	11–5	13–15
4	Norfolk State	11–5	17–13
5	Savannah State	10–6	11–18
6	Florida A&M	8–8	13–17
7	Coppin State	7–9	10–19
8	Howard	5–11	7–24
9	North Carolina A&T	5–11	9–22
10	Bethune-Cookman	5–11	7–24
11	Delaware State	5–11	9–20
12	South Carolina State	5–11	9–20
13	Maryland Eastern Shore	4–12	6–23
‡ – MEAC regular season champions. † – Received a bye in the conference tournament. Overall records are as of the end of the regular season.

== Bracket ==
First round March 10 and 11
8	Howard	53
9	North Carolina A&T	47
4	Norfolk State	78
13	Maryland Eastern Shore	74
5	Savannah State	61
12	South Carolina State	47
7	Coppin State	75
10	Bethune-Cookman	68
6	Florida A&M	65
11	Delaware State	61

Quarterfinals; March 12 and 13
1	North Carolina Central	92
8	Howard	46
4	Norfolk State	57
5	Savannah State	47
2	Hampton	77
7	Coppin State	83
3	Morgan State	81
6	Florida A&M	68

Semifinals; March 14
1	North Carolina Central	68
4	Norfolk State	45
7	Coppin State	64
3	Morgan State	79

Championship; March 15; ESPNU
1	North Carolina Central	71
3	Morgan State	62
