= 2013–14 South Carolina State Bulldogs basketball team =

American college basketball season

2013–14 South Carolina State Bulldogs men's basketball
- Conference: Mid-Eastern Athletic Conference
- Record: 9–21 (5–11 MEAC)
- Head coach: Murray Garvin (Interim 1st season)
- Assistant coaches: Kevin Spencer; Rio Pitt
- Home arena: SHM Memorial Center

2013–14 MEAC men's basketball standings
	Conf.				Overall
Team	W		L	PCT	W		L	PCT
North Carolina Central †	15	–	1	.938	28	–	6	.824
Hampton	13	–	3	.813	18	–	13	.581
Norfolk State	11	–	5	.688	19	–	15	.559
Morgan State	11	–	5	.688	15	–	16	.484
Savannah State	10	–	6	.625	13	–	19	.406
Florida A&M	8	–	8	.500	14	–	18	.438
Coppin State	7	–	9	.438	12	–	20	.375
Delaware State	5	–	11	.313	9	–	21	.300
South Carolina State	5	–	11	.313	9	–	21	.300
North Carolina A&T	5	–	11	.313	9	–	23	.281
Howard	5	–	11	.313	8	–	25	.242
Bethune–Cookman	5	–	11	.313	7	–	25	.219
Maryland Eastern Shore	4	–	12	.250	6	–	24	.200
† 2014 MEAC tournament winner

The 2013–14 South Carolina State Bulldogs basketball team represented South Carolina State University during the 2013–14 NCAA Division I men's basketball season. The Bulldogs, led by interim year head coach Murray Garvin, played their home games at the SHM Memorial Center and were members of the Mid-Eastern Athletic Conference. They finished the season 9–21, 5–11 in MEAC play to finish in a five way tie for eighth place. They lost in the first round of the MEAC tournament to Savannah State.

== Roster ==
Number	Name	Position	Height	Weight	Year	Hometown
0	Jalen White	Guard	6–1	185	Freshman	Charlotte, North Carolina
2	Theron Stephens	Guard	5–9	165	Senior	Reading, Pennsylvania
3	Jordan Smith	Guard	6–3	170	Sophomore	Palmetto, Florida
4	Patrick Kirksey	Forward	6–5	200	Freshman	Simpsonville, South Carolina
5	Louis Adams	Guard	6–1	180	Senior	Dakar, Senegal
10	Patrick Myers	Guard	6–2	185	Sophomore	Orangeburg, South Carolina
11	Shaquille Mitchell	Guard	6–4	190	Sophomore	Hollywood, South Carolina
12	Greg Mortimer	Guard	6–3	175	Freshman	Savannah, Georgia
15	Devin Joint	Guard	6–4	190	Sophomore	Darlington, South Carolina
20	Chasen Campbell	Forward	6–8	250	Senior	Charlotte, North Carolina
22	Matthew Hezekiah	Forward	6–11	225	Senior	Jacksonville, Florida
23	Darrion Eastmon	Guard	6–2	180	Sophomore	Fayetteville, North Carolina
30	Darryl Palmer	Forward	6–7	210	Sophomore	Summerville, South Carolina
32	Karon Wright	Guard	6–0	185	Freshman	Jackson, South Carolina
33	Luka Radovic	Forward	6–9	220	Junior	Podgorica, Montenegro

== Schedule ==
Date time, TV	Opponent	Result	Record	Site (attendance) city, state
Exhibition
11/04/2013*; 7:30 pm, no	Claflin; Garden City Basketball Classic	W 67–57		SHM Memorial Center; Orangeburg, SC
Regular season
11/08/2013*; 7:00 pm, no	at Marshall	L 69–85	0–1	Cam Henderson Center (5,067); Huntington, WV
11/10/2013*; 6:00 pm, no	St. Andrews	W 59–55	1–1	SHM Memorial Center (387); Orangeburg, SC
11/12/2013*; 7:00 pm, no	at No. 7 Michigan	L 59–93	1–2	Crisler Center (12,707); Ann Arbor, MI
11/17/2013*; 3:00 pm, no	at Nebraska	L 57–83	1–3	Pinnacle Bank Arena (10,974); Lincoln, NE
11/19/2013*; 7:00 pm, no	at Nebraska–Omaha	L 59–91	1–4	Ralston Arena (873); Ralston, NE
11/23/2013*; 6:00 pm, no	Voorhees	W 88–74	2–4	SHM Memorial Center (250); Orangeburg, SC
11/25/2013*; 7:30 pm, no	Nebraska–Omaha	L 67–83	2–5	SHM Memorial Center (197); Orangeburg, SC
12/03/2013*; 7:00 pm, no	at Clemson	L 49–65	2–6	Littlejohn Coliseum (5,000); Clemson, SC
12/07/2013*; 6:00 pm, no	Georgia Southern	L 61–79	2–7	SHM Memorial Center (302); Orangeburg, SC
12/17/2013*; 7:30 pm, no	Coastal Carolina	W 83–78	3–7	SHM Memorial Center (227); Orangeburg, SC
12/23/2013*; 7:30 pm, no	at Jacksonville	L 47–61	3–8	Jacksonville Veterans Memorial Arena (321); Jacksonville, FL
12/30/2013*; 7:00 pm, no	at Coastal Carolina	W 68–58	4–8	HTC Center (1,700); Conway, SC
01/03/2014*; 7:00 pm, no	at South Carolina	L 75–82	4–9	Colonial Life Arena (7,357); Columbia, SC
01/08/2014; 7:30 pm, no	Maryland Eastern Shore	W 78–71	5–9 (1–0)	SHM Memorial Center (192); Orangeburg, SC
01/11/2014; 4:00 pm, no	at Morgan State	L 56–73	5–10 (1–1)	Talmadge L. Hill Field House (N/A); Baltimore, MD
01/13/2014; 7:30 pm, no	at Coppin State	L 69–75	5–11 (1–2)	Physical Education Complex (589); Baltimore, MD
01/18/2014; 6:00 pm, no	Florida A&M	L 72–78	5–12 (1–3)	SHM Memorial Center (1,024); Orangeburg, SC
01/20/2014; 7:30 pm, no	Bethune-Cookman	W 69–67	6–12 (2–3)	SHM Memorial Center (751); Orangeburg, SC
01/25/2014; 6:00 pm, no	Norfolk State	W 73–61	7–12 (3–3)	SHM Memorial Center (444); Orangeburg, SC
01/27/2014; 7:30 pm, no	Hampton	L 56–67	7–13 (3–4)	SHM Memorial Center (806); Orangeburg, SC
02/01/2014; 4:00 pm, no	at Florida A&M	W 63–59 ^{OT}	8–13 (4–4)	Teaching Gym (2,359); Tallahassee, FL
02/03/2014; 7:30 pm, no	at Bethune-Cookman	L 59–91	8–14 (4–5)	Moore Gymnasium (1,063); Daytona Beach, FL
02/08/2014; 4:00 pm, no	at Delaware State	L 53–61	8–15 (4–6)	Memorial Hall (483); Dover, DE
02/15/2014; 6:00 pm, no	North Carolina Central	L 53–67	8–16 (4–7)	SHM Memorial Center (566); Orangeburg, SC
02/17/2014; 7:30 pm, no	North Carolina A&T	W 75–70 ^{OT}	9–16 (5–7)	SHM Memorial Center (1,124); Orangeburg, SC
02/22/2014; 6:00 pm, no	Savannah State	L 65–75	9–17 (5–8)	SHM Memorial Center (927); Orangeburg, SC
03/01/2014; 4:00 pm, no	at North Carolina Central	L 44–86	9–18 (5–9)	McLendon–McDougald Gymnasium (2,414); Durham, NC
03/03/2014; 7:30 pm, no	at North Carolina A&T	L 60–62	9–19 (5–10)	Corbett Sports Center (854); Greensboro, NC
03/06/2014; 7:30 pm, no	at Savannah State	L 50–69	9–20 (5–11)	Tiger Arena (2,300); Savannah, GA
2014 MEAC tournament
03/10/2014; 9:00 pm, no	vs. Savannah State; First round	L 47–61	9–21	Norfolk Scope (N/A); Norfolk, VA
*Non-conference game. ^{#}Rankings from AP Poll. (#) Tournament seedings in parentheses. All times are in Eastern Time.
