= 2013–14 Coppin State Eagles men's basketball team =

American college basketball season

2013–14 Coppin State Eagles men's basketball
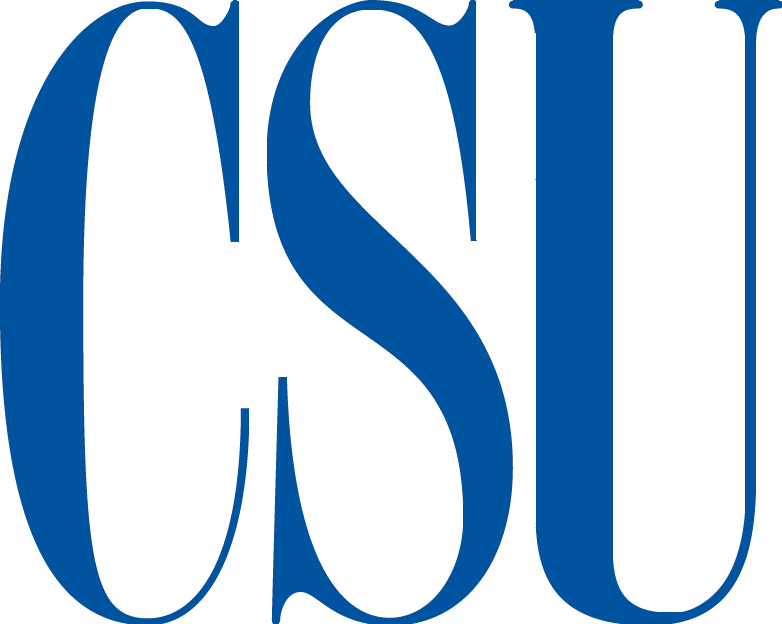
- Conference: Mid-Eastern Athletic Conference
- Record: 12–20 (7–9 MEAC)
- Head coach: Fang Mitchell (28th season)
- Assistant coaches: Keith Johnson; Larry Tucker; Jay Dull
- Home arena: Physical Education Complex

2013–14 MEAC men's basketball standings
	Conf.				Overall
Team	W		L	PCT	W		L	PCT
North Carolina Central †	15	–	1	.938	28	–	6	.824
Hampton	13	–	3	.813	18	–	13	.581
Norfolk State	11	–	5	.688	19	–	15	.559
Morgan State	11	–	5	.688	15	–	16	.484
Savannah State	10	–	6	.625	13	–	19	.406
Florida A&M	8	–	8	.500	14	–	18	.438
Coppin State	7	–	9	.438	12	–	20	.375
Delaware State	5	–	11	.313	9	–	21	.300
South Carolina State	5	–	11	.313	9	–	21	.300
North Carolina A&T	5	–	11	.313	9	–	23	.281
Howard	5	–	11	.313	8	–	25	.242
Bethune–Cookman	5	–	11	.313	7	–	25	.219
Maryland Eastern Shore	4	–	12	.250	6	–	24	.200
† 2014 MEAC tournament winner

The 2013–14 Coppin State Eagles men's basketball team represented Coppin State University during the 2013–14 NCAA Division I men's basketball season. The Eagles, led by 28th year head coach Fang Mitchell, played their home games at the Physical Education Complex and were members of the Mid-Eastern Athletic Conference. They finished the season 12–20, 7–9 in MEAC play to finish in seventh place. They advanced to the semifinals of the MEAC tournament, where they lost to Morgan State.

At the end of the season, head coach Fang Mitchell's contract was not renewed. He posted a record of 429–417 in 28 seasons.

== Roster ==
Number	Name	Position	Height	Year	Hometown
0	Arnold Fripp	Forward	6–7	Junior	Brooklyn, New York
1	Daguan Brickhouse	Guard	5–8	Junior	Peekskill, New York
2	Sterling Smith	Guard	6–4	Sophomore	Chico, California
3	Dallas Gary	Forward	6–5	Junior	Buffalo, New York
4	Zach Burnham	Forward	6–7	Sophomore	Davenport, Iowa
5	Andre Armstrong	Guard	6–3	Senior	Jamaica Queens
10	Christian Kessee	Guard	6–2	Freshman	Las Vegas, Nevada
11	Taariq Cephas	Guard	5–10	Junior	Bear, Delaware
15	Van Rolle	Guard	6–1	Freshman	Edgewood, Maryland
21	Michael Murray	Forward	6–5	Senior	Brooklyn, New York
23	Johyari Josiah	Guard	6–4	Junior	Brooklyn, New York
24	Michael Oyefusi	Guard	6–3	Sophomore	Randallstown, Maryland
34	Charles Iaens	Forward	6–9	Senior	Pflugerville, Texas
40	Brandon St. Louis	Forward	6–8	Junior	Valley Stream, New York
54	Jerimyiah Batts	Forward	6–8	Freshman	Jenkintown, Pennsylvania

== Schedule ==
Date time, TV	Opponent	Result	Record	Site (attendance) city, state
Regular season
11/08/2013*; 11:59 pm, Pac-12 Network	at California	L 64–83	0–1	Haas Pavilion (8,249); Berkeley, CA
11/10/2013*; 8:00 pm, Pac-12 Network	at Oregon State	W 78–73	1–1	Gill Coliseum (4,062); Corvallis, OR
11/18/2013*; 7:30 pm	Wagner	L 87–102	1–2	Physical Education Complex (500); Baltimore, MD
11/25/2013*; 7:30 pm	Ohio Valley	W 96–79	2–2	Physical Education Complex (900); Baltimore, MD
11/29/2013*; 3:00 pm, BTN	at No. 22 Michigan	L 45–87	2–3	Crisler Center (12,707); Ann Arbor, MI
12/01/2013*; 8:00 pm, ROOT	at No. 11 Gonzaga	L 51–86	2–4	McCarthey Athletic Center (6,000); Spokane, WA
12/07/2013; 4:00 pm	at Delaware State	W 73–54	3–4 (1–0)	Memorial Hall (1,206); Dover, DE
12/11/2013*; 7:30 pm	UMBC	W 91–71	4–4	Physical Education Complex (455); Baltimore, MD
12/14/2013*; 6:00 pm	at Richmond	L 49–71	4–5	Robins Center (5,804); Richmond, VA
12/20/2013*; 10:00 pm	vs. Southern Miss; BVI Tropical Shootout	L 74–88	4–6	Multipurpose Sports Complex (N/A); Tortola, BVI
12/21/2013*; 6:00 pm	vs. Jacksonville State; BVI Tropical Shootout	L 61–72	4–7	Multipurpose Sports Complex (N/A); Tortola, BVI
12/28/2013*; 2:00 pm	at Toledo	L 66–85	4–8	Savage Arena (4,632); Toledo, OH
12/31/2013*; 6:00 pm	at Akron	L 66–77	4–9	James A. Rhodes Arena (2,701); Akron, OH
01/04/2014*; 4:00 pm	Towson	L 79–81	4–10	Physical Education Complex (1,123); Baltimore, MD
01/11/2014; 4:00 pm	Savannah State	L 53–75	4–11 (1–1)	Physical Education Complex (671); Baltimore, MD
01/13/2014; 7:30 pm	South Carolina State	W 75–69	5–11 (2–1)	Physical Education Complex (589); Baltimore, MD
01/18/2014; 6:00 pm	at Hampton	W 71–68	6–11 (3–1)	Hampton Convocation Center (4,981); Hampton, VA
01/20/2014; 8:00 pm	at Norfolk State	L 71–83	6–12 (3–2)	Joseph G. Echols Memorial Hall (1,425); Norfolk, VA
01/25/2014; 4:00 pm	North Carolina Central	L 63–87	6–13 (3–3)	Physical Education Complex (1,618); Baltimore, MD
01/27/2014; 8:00 pm	at North Carolina A&T	W 70–54	7–13 (4–3)	Corbett Sports Center (2,493); Greensboro, NC
02/01/2014; 4:00 pm	Hampton	L 76–79 ^{OT}	7–14 (4–4)	Physical Education Complex (728); Baltimore, MD
02/03/2014; 4:00 pm	Delaware State	W 54–53	8–14 (5–4)	Physical Education Complex (874); Baltimore, MD
02/08/2014; 4:00 pm	at Maryland Eastern Shore	W 58–50	9–14 (6–4)	Hytche Athletic Center (1,579); Princess Anne, MD
02/10/2014; 7:30 pm	Morgan State	L 77–82	9–15 (6–5)	Physical Education Complex (3,103); Baltimore, MD
02/15/2014; 6:00 pm	at Florida A&M	L 71–82	9–16 (6–6)	Teaching Gym (1,802); Tallahassee, FL
02/19/2014; 7:30 pm	at Morgan State	L 69–78	9–17 (6–7)	Talmadge L. Hill Field House (4,500); Baltimore, MD
02/22/2014; 4:00 pm	Norfolk State	L 68–73	9–18 (6–8)	Physical Education Complex (385); Baltimore, MD
03/01/2014; 4:00 pm	Maryland Eastern Shore	L 67–68	9–19 (6–9)	Physical Education Complex (2,899); Baltimore, MD
03/03/2014; 7:30 pm	Howard	W 86–69	10–19 (7–9)	Physical Education Complex (543); Baltimore, MD
2014 MEAC tournament
03/11/2014; 6:30 pm	vs. Bethune-Cookman; First round	W 75–68	11–19	Norfolk Scope (4,658); Norfolk, VA
03/12/2014; 8:00 pm	vs. Hampton; Quarterfinals	W 83–77	12–19	Norfolk Scope (6,663); Norfolk, VA
03/14/2014; 8:00 pm	vs. Morgan State; Semifinals	L 64–79	12–20	Norfolk Scope (8,608); Norfolk, VA
*Non-conference game. ^{#}Rankings from AP Poll. (#) Tournament seedings in parentheses. All times are in Eastern Time.
