= 2013–14 Bethune–Cookman Wildcats men's basketball team =

American college basketball season

2013–14 Bethune–Cookman Wildcats men's basketball
- Conference: Mid-Eastern Athletic Conference
- Record: 7–25 (5–11 MEAC)
- Head coach: Gravelle Craig (3rd season)
- Assistant coaches: Rodney Martin; Stacy Beckton; Montez Robinson
- Home arena: Moore Gymnasium

2013–14 MEAC men's basketball standings
	Conf.				Overall
Team	W		L	PCT	W		L	PCT
North Carolina Central †	15	–	1	.938	28	–	6	.824
Hampton	13	–	3	.813	18	–	13	.581
Norfolk State	11	–	5	.688	19	–	15	.559
Morgan State	11	–	5	.688	15	–	16	.484
Savannah State	10	–	6	.625	13	–	19	.406
Florida A&M	8	–	8	.500	14	–	18	.438
Coppin State	7	–	9	.438	12	–	20	.375
Delaware State	5	–	11	.313	9	–	21	.300
South Carolina State	5	–	11	.313	9	–	21	.300
North Carolina A&T	5	–	11	.313	9	–	23	.281
Howard	5	–	11	.313	8	–	25	.242
Bethune–Cookman	5	–	11	.313	7	–	25	.219
Maryland Eastern Shore	4	–	12	.250	6	–	24	.200
† 2014 MEAC tournament winner

The 2013–14 Bethune–Cookman Wildcats men's basketball team represented Bethune–Cookman University during the 2013–14 NCAA Division I men's basketball season. The Wildcats, led by third year head coach Gravelle Craig, played their home games at the Moore Gymnasium and were members of the Mid-Eastern Athletic Conference. They finished the season 7–25, 5–11 in MEAC play to finish in five way tie for eighth place. They lost in the first round of the MEAC tournament to Coppin State.

== Roster ==
Number	Name	Position	Height	Weight	Year	Hometown
3	Tony Kynard	Guard	6–1	160	Freshman	Toledo, Ohio
4	Barry Smith	Forward	6–6	200	Junior	Pittsburgh, Pennsylvania
5	Troy Simmons	Guard	6–1	170	Junior	Lehigh Acres, Florida
10	Malik Jackson	Guard	6–6	188	Senior	Central Islip, New York
11	Maurice Taylor	Guard	6–3	180	Junior	Toledo, Ohio
12	Mikel Trapp	Guard	6–2	195	Junior	Blair, South Carolina
21	Clemmye Owens	Guard	6–1	185	Freshman	Toledo, Ohio
22	Ricky Johnson	Guard	5–9	160	Junior	Akron, Ohio
23	Daquan Brown	Forward	6–10	215	Senior	Brooklyn, New York
32	Travis Elliott	Center	6–8	230	Junior	Fort Lauderdale, Florida
33	Allan Dempster	Forward	6–7	210	Sophomore	Philadelphia, Pennsylvania

== Schedule ==
Date time, TV	Opponent	Result	Record	Site (attendance) city, state
Regular season
11/09/2013*; 1:00 pm	Trinity Baptist	W 91–74	1–0	Moore Gymnasium (409); Daytona Beach, FL
11/12/2013*; 7:00 pm, ESPN3	at South Florida	L 65–91	1–1	USF Sun Dome (3,549); Tampa, FL
11/17/2013*; 2:00 pm, ESPN3	at UCF	L 63–83	1–2	CFE Arena (4,095); Orlando, FL
11/19/2013*; 7:00 pm	Trinity (FL)	W 98–55	2–2	Moore Gymnasium (1,180); Daytona Beach, FL
11/21/2013*; 7:00 pm	FIU	L 67–82	2–3	Moore Gymnasium (N/A); Daytona Beach, FL
11/25/2013*; 9:00 pm	at New Mexico State; Colorado State Challenge	L 56–79	2–4	Pan American Center (4,985); Las Cruces, NM
11/27/2013*; 4:00 pm	at New Mexico State; Colorado State Challenge	L 52–66	2–5	Moby Arena (2,945); Fort Collins, CO
11/29/2013*; 9:00 pm	vs. Prairie View A&M; Colorado State Challenge	L 80–89	2–6	Butler–Hancock Sports Pavilion (102); Greeley, CO
11/30/2013*; 9:00 pm	at Northern Colorado; Colorado State Challenge	L 60–65	2–7	Butler–Hancock Sports Pavilion (N/A); Greeley, CO
12/03/2013*; 7:00 pm	at Stetson	L 52–56	2–8	Edmunds Center (1,056); DeLand, FL
12/07/2013; 6:00 pm	at Norfolk State	L 45–59	2–9 (0–1)	Joseph G. Echols Memorial Hall (1,425); Norfolk, VA
12/09/2013; 7:00 pm	at Hampton	L 52–85	2–10 (0–2)	Hampton Convocation Center (1,428); Hampton, VA
12/14/2013*; 4:00 pm	at Akron	L 56–84	2–11	James A. Rhodes Arena (2,763); Akron, OH
12/17/2013*; 7:00 pm	at Youngstown State	L 59–71	2–12	Beeghly Center (1,399); Youngstown, OH
12/21/2013*; 7:00 pm	at North Florida	L 64–68	2–13	UNF Arena (617); Jacksonville, FL
12/30/2013*; 8:00 pm	at Detroit	L 53–73	2–14	Calihan Hall (3,107); Detroit, MI
01/03/2014*; 8:00 pm	at Northern Illinois	L 51–65	2–15	Convocation Center (657); DeKalb, IL
01/11/2014; 4:00 pm	North Carolina A&T	L 67–70	2–16 (0–3)	Moore Gymnasium (1,091); Daytona Beach, FL
01/13/2014; 7:30 pm	North Carolina Central	L 49–64	2–17 (0–4)	Moore Gymnasium (1,210); Daytona Beach, FL
01/18/2014; 6:00 pm	at Savannah State	L 60–70 ^{OT}	2–18 (0–5)	Tiger Arena (3,220); Savannah, GA
01/20/2014; 7:30 pm	at South Carolina State	L 67–69	2–19 (0–6)	SHM Memorial Center (751); Orangeburg, SC
01/25/2014; 4:00 pm	Maryland Eastern Shore	W 69–63	3–19 (1–6)	Moore Gymnasium (1,030); Daytona Beach, FL
01/27/2014; 7:30 pm	Howard	W 58–47	4–19 (2–6)	Moore Gymnasium (1,216); Daytona Beach, FL
02/01/2014; 4:00 pm	Savannah State	L 40–50	4–20 (2–7)	Moore Gymnasium (1,075); Daytona Beach, FL
02/03/2014; 7:30 pm	South Carolina State	W 91–59	5–20 (3–7)	Moore Gymnasium (1,063); Daytona Beach, FL
02/08/2014; 4:00 pm	at North Carolina Central	L 54–77	5–21 (3–8)	McLendon–McDougald Gymnasium (2,420); Durham, NC
02/10/2014; 8:00 pm	at North Carolina A&T	W 72–71	6–21 (4–8)	Corbett Sports Center (1,019); Greensboro, NC
02/15/2014; 4:00 pm	Delaware State	L 67–79	6–22 (4–9)	Moore Gymnasium (843); Daytona Beach, FL
02/22/2014; 4:00 pm	Florida A&M	L 75–80	6–23 (4–10)	Moore Gymnasium (3,231); Daytona Beach, FL
03/01/2014; 4:00 pm	at Morgan State	L 61–65	6–24 (4–11)	Talmadge L. Hill Field House (2,056); Baltimore, MD
03/06/2014; 7:30 pm	at Florida A&M	W 70–68	7–24 (5–11)	Teaching Gym (2,376); Tallahassee, FL
2014 MEAC tournament
03/11/2014; 6:30 pm	vs. Coppin State; First round	L 68–75	7–25	Norfolk Scope (4,658); Norfolk, VA
*Non-conference game. ^{#}Rankings from AP Poll. (#) Tournament seedings in parentheses. All times are in Eastern Time.
