= 2015–16 Notre Dame Fighting Irish men's basketball team =

American college basketball season

2015–16 Notre Dame Fighting Irish men's basketball

NCAA tournament, Elite Eight
- Conference: Atlantic Coast Conference

Ranking
- Coaches: No. 17
- Record: 24–12 (11–7 ACC)
- Head coach: Mike Brey (16th season)
- Assistant coaches: Anthony Solomon; Rod Balanis; Martin Ingelsby
- Home arena: Edmund P. Joyce Center

2015–16 ACC men's basketball standings
	Conf.				Overall
Team	W		L	PCT	W		L	PCT
No. 3 North Carolina †	14	–	4	.778	33	–	7	.825
No. 4 Virginia	13	–	5	.722	29	–	8	.784
No. 10 Miami (FL)	13	–	5	.722	27	–	8	.771
No. 16 Louisville*	12	–	6	.667	23	–	8	.742
Notre Dame	11	–	7	.611	24	–	12	.667
No. 19 Duke	11	–	7	.611	25	–	11	.694
Virginia Tech	10	–	8	.556	20	–	15	.571
Clemson	10	–	8	.556	17	–	14	.548
Pittsburgh	9	–	9	.500	21	–	12	.636
Syracuse	9	–	9	.500	23	–	14	.622
Georgia Tech	8	–	10	.444	21	–	15	.583
Florida State	8	–	10	.444	20	–	14	.588
NC State	5	–	13	.278	16	–	17	.485
Wake Forest	2	–	16	.111	11	–	20	.355
Boston College	0	–	18	.000	7	–	25	.219
† 2016 ACC tournament winner * Ineligible for both the 2016 ACC tournament and the 2016 NCAA tournament due to self-imposed postseason ban. Rankings from AP poll

The 2015–16 Notre Dame Fighting Irish men's basketball team represented the University of Notre Dame during the 2015–16 NCAA Division I men's basketball season. The Fighting Irish, led by sixteenth year head coach Mike Brey, played its home games at Edmund P. Joyce Center in South Bend, Indiana and were third year members of the Atlantic Coast Conference. They finished the season 24–12, 11–7 in ACC play to finish in a tie for fifth place. They defeated Duke in the quarterfinals of the ACC tournament to advance to the semifinals where they lost to North Carolina. They received an at-large bid to the NCAA tournament where they defeated Michigan, Stephen F. Austin, and Wisconsin to advance to the Elite Eight where they lost to fellow ACC member North Carolina.

== Previous season ==
The Fighting Irish finished the season 32–6, 14–4 in ACC play to finish in third place. They defeated Miami (FL), Duke, and North Carolina to become champions of the ACC tournament. They received an automatic bid to the NCAA tournament where they defeated Northeastern in the second round, Butler in the third round, and Wichita State in the Sweet Sixteen before losing in the Elite Eight to unbeaten Kentucky in a close game, 68–66.

== Offseason ==
=== Departures ===
Name	Number	Pos.	Height	Weight	Year	Hometown	Notes
Eric Katenda	15	F	6'9"	230	Junior	Paris, France	Graduate transferred to North Texas
Jerian Grant	22	G	6'5"	202	Senior	Bowie, MD	Graduated/2015 NBA draft
Pat Connaughton	24	G/F	6'5"	206	Senior	Arlington, MA	Graduated/2015 NBA draft

=== 2015 recruiting class ===
College recruiting
Name	Hometown	School	Height	Weight	Commit date
Rex Pflueger; SG	Dana Point, CA	Mater Dei High School	6 ft 5 in (1.96 m)	180 lb (82 kg)	Sep 11, 2014
Rex Pflueger; SG	Recruit ratings: Scout: Rivals: 247Sports: ESPN:				
Elijah Burns; PF	Troy, NY	Blair Academy	6 ft 8 in (2.03 m)	230 lb (100 kg)	Jul 19, 2014
Elijah Burns; PF	Recruit ratings: Scout: Rivals: 247Sports: ESPN:				
Matt Ryan; SF	Cortlandt Manor, NY	Iona College Prep	6 ft 5 in (1.96 m)	185 lb (84 kg)	Jul 11, 2014
Matt Ryan; SF	Recruit ratings: Scout: Rivals: 247Sports: ESPN:				
Overall recruit ranking: Scout: 15 Rivals: 20 ESPN: 17
Note: In many cases, Scout, Rivals, 247Sports, On3, and ESPN may conflict in their listings of height and weight.; In these cases, the average was taken. ESPN grades are on a 100-point scale.; Sources: "Notre Dame 2015 Basketball Commitments". Rivals.; "2015 Notre Dame Commits". Scout.; "2015 Player Commitments – Notre Dame". ESPN.; "Scout.com Team Recruiting Rankings". Scout.; "2015 Team Ranking". Rivals.

=== 2016 Recruiting class ===
College recruiting (2016)
Name	Hometown	School	Height	Weight	Commit date
T. J. Gibbs; SG	Scotch Plains, NJ	Seton Hall Prep	6 ft 2 in (1.88 m)	180 lb (82 kg)	May 4, 2015
T. J. Gibbs; SG	Recruit ratings: Scout: Rivals: 247Sports: ESPN:				
Overall recruit ranking: Scout: 15 Rivals: 20 ESPN: 17
Note: In many cases, Scout, Rivals, 247Sports, On3, and ESPN may conflict in their listings of height and weight.; In these cases, the average was taken. ESPN grades are on a 100-point scale.; Sources: "Notre Dame 2016 Basketball Commitments". Rivals.; "2016 Notre Dame Commits". Scout.; "2016 Player Commitments – Notre Dame". ESPN.; "Scout.com Team Recruiting Rankings". Scout.; "2016 Team Ranking". Rivals.

== Roster ==
2015–16 Notre Dame Fighting Irish men's basketball team
Players
Coaches

Pos.	#	Name	Height	Weight	Year	Previous school	Hometown
G	0	Rex Pflueger	6 ft 6 in (1.98 m)	198 lb (90 kg)	Fr	Mater Dei	Dana Point, California
F	1	Austin Torres	6 ft 7 in (2.01 m)	234 lb (106 kg)	RS So	Penn	Granger, Indiana
F	3	V. J. Beachem	6 ft 8 in (2.03 m)	200 lb (91 kg)	Jr	New Haven	Fort Wayne, Indiana
F	4	Matt Ryan	6 ft 8 in (2.03 m)	217 lb (98 kg)	Fr	Iona Preparatory	Cortlandt Manor, New York
G	5	Matt Farrell	6 ft 1 in (1.85 m)	175 lb (79 kg)	So	Point Pleasant Beach	Point Pleasant, New Jersey
G	11	Demetrius Jackson	6 ft 1 in (1.85 m)	201 lb (91 kg)	Jr	Marian	Mishawaka, Indiana
F	12	Elijah Burns (redshirt)	6 ft 9 in (2.06 m)	234 lb (106 kg)	Fr	Blair Academy	Troy, New York
F	20	Austin Burgett	6 ft 9 in (2.06 m)	232 lb (105 kg)	Sr	Avon	Avon, Indiana
F	21	Matt Gregory (W)	6 ft 6 in (1.98 m)	200 lb (91 kg)	So	Cathedral	Avon, Indiana
F	23	Martinas Geben	6 ft 10 in (2.08 m)	253 lb (115 kg)	So	St. Maria Goretti	Vilnius, Lithuania
F	30	Zach Auguste	6 ft 10 in (2.08 m)	245 lb (111 kg)	Sr	New Hampton	Marlborough, Massachusetts
G	32	Steve Vasturia	6 ft 5 in (1.96 m)	212 lb (96 kg)	Jr	St. Joseph's Prep	Medford, New Jersey
F	35	Bonzie Colson	6 ft 5 in (1.96 m)	225 lb (102 kg)	So	St. Andrew's School	New Bedford, Massachusetts

Head coach

- Mike Brey

Assistant coach(es)

- Anthony Solomon
- Rod Balanis
- Martin Ingelsby

Legend

- (C) Team captain
- (S) Suspended
- (I) Ineligible
- (W) Walk-on
- Injured
- Current redshirt

Roster

== Schedule and results ==
Date time, TV	Rank^{#}	Opponent^{#}	Result	Record	Site (attendance) city, state
Exhibition
Oct 30, 2015*; 7:00 pm	No. 19	St. Francis (IL)	W 87–56		Edmund P. Joyce Center (5,873); South Bend, IN
Nov 5, 2015*; 7:00 pm	No. 19	Caldwell	W 81–56		Edmund P. Joyce Center (5,585); South Bend, IN
Non-conference regular season
Nov 13, 2015*; 7:30 pm, ESPN3	No. 19	Saint Francis (PA)	W 87–56	1–0	Edmund P. Joyce Center (9,149); South Bend, IN
Nov 17, 2015*; 7:00 pm, ESPN3	No. 18	Milwaukee	W 86–78	2–0	Edmund P. Joyce Center (7,464); South Bend, IN
Nov 21, 2015*; 2:00 pm, ESPN3	No. 18	UMass Lowell	W 83–57	3–0	Edmund P. Joyce Center (8,888); South Bend, IN
Nov 26, 2015*; 6:30 pm, ESPNU	No. 17	vs. Monmouth; AdvoCare Invitational First Round	L 68–70	3–1	HP Field House (4,871); Lake Buena Vista, FL
Nov 27, 2015*; 7:00 pm, ESPN3	No. 17	vs. Iowa; Advocare Invitational Consolation 2nd Round	W 68–62	4–1	HP Field House (4,508); Lake Buena Vista, FL
Nov 29, 2015*; 7:00 pm, ESPNU	No. 17	vs. Alabama; Advocare Invitational 5th Place Game	L 73–74	4–2	HP Field House (4,633); Lake Buena Vista, FL
Dec 2, 2015*; 9:15 pm, ESPN2		at Illinois; ACC–Big Ten Challenge	W 84–79	5–2	State Farm Center (14,953); Champaign, IL
Dec 8, 2015*; 9:00 pm, ESPNU		Stony Brook	W 86–61	6–2	Edmund P. Joyce Center (7,537); South Bend, IN
Dec 13, 2015*; 2:00 pm, ESPN3		Loyola–Chicago	W 81–61	7–2	Edmund P. Joyce Center (8,653); South Bend, IN
Dec 19, 2015*; 2:00 pm, ESPN2		vs. Indiana; Crossroads Classic	L 73-80	7–3	Bankers Life Fieldhouse (19,156); Indianapolis, IN
Dec 21, 2015*; 7:00 pm, ESPN3		Youngstown State	W 87–78	8–3	Edmund P. Joyce Center (7,313); South Bend, IN
Dec 29, 2015*; 5:00 pm, ESPNU		Liberty	W 73–56	9–3	Edmund P. Joyce Center (8,837); South Bend, IN
ACC Regular season
Jan 2, 2016; 5:00 pm, ESPN2		at No. 5 Virginia	L 66–77	9–4 (0–1)	John Paul Jones Arena (14,389); Charlottesville, VA
Jan 7, 2016; 7:00 pm, RSN		at Boston College	W 82–54	10–4 (1–1)	Conte Forum (4,165); Chestnut Hill, MA
Jan 9, 2016; 4:00 pm, RSN		No. 24 Pittsburgh	L 82–86	10–5 (1–2)	Edmund P. Joyce Center (8,298); South Bend, IN
Jan 13, 2016; 9:00 pm, ACCN		Georgia Tech	W 72–64	11–5 (2–2)	Edmund P. Joyce Center (7,795); South Bend, IN
Jan 16, 2016; 2:00 pm, ESPN2		at No. 9 Duke	W 95–91	12–5 (3–2)	Cameron Indoor Stadium (9,314); Durham, NC
Jan 20, 2016; 7:00 pm, RSN		Virginia Tech	W 83–81	13–5 (4–2)	Edmund P. Joyce Center (7,888); South Bend, IN
Jan 23, 2016; 12:00 pm, ACCN		Boston College	W 76–49	14–5 (5–2)	Edmund P. Joyce Center (9,149); South Bend, IN
Jan 28, 2016; 7:00 pm, ESPN2	No. 25	at Syracuse	L 66–81	14–6 (5–3)	Carrier Dome (22,861); Syracuse, NY
Jan 31, 2016; 1:00 pm, ACCN	No. 25	Wake Forest	W 85–62	15–6 (6–3)	Edmund P. Joyce Center (9,149); South Bend, IN
Feb 3, 2016; 7:00 pm, ESPN2		at No. 17 Miami (FL)	L 70–79	15–7 (6–4)	Bank United Center (6,819); Coral Gables, FL
Feb 6, 2016; 7:00 pm, ESPN		No. 2 North Carolina; ESPN College GameDay	W 80–76	16–7 (7–4)	Edmund P. Joyce Center (9,149); South Bend, IN
Feb 8, 2016; 9:00 pm, ESPNU		at Clemson	W 89–83	17–7 (8–4)	Bon Secours Wellness Arena (8,195); Greenville, SC
Feb 13, 2016; 4:00 pm, ESPN2		No. 13 Louisville	W 71–66	18–7 (9–4)	Edmund P. Joyce Center (9,149); South Bend, IN
Feb 20, 2016; 8:00 pm, ESPN2	No. 19	at Georgia Tech	L 62–63	18–8 (9–5)	Hank McCamish Pavilion (8,600); Atlanta, GA
Feb 24, 2016; 9:00 pm, RSN	No. 23	at Wake Forest	W 69–58	19–8 (10–5)	LJVM Coliseum (8,498); Winston-Salem, NC
Feb 27, 2016; 4:00 pm, ESPN2	No. 23	at Florida State	L 56–77	19–9 (10–6)	Donald L. Tucker Civic Center (7,819); Tallahassee, FL
Mar 2, 2016; 7:00 pm, ESPN2		No. 7 Miami (FL)	L 50–68	19–10 (10–7)	Edmund P. Joyce Center (9,149); South Bend, IN
Mar 5, 2016; 12:00 pm, CBS		NC State	W 89–75	20–10 (11–7)	Edmund P. Joyce Center (8,715); South Bend, IN
ACC Tournament
Mar 10, 2016; 2:00 pm, ESPN	(4)	vs. (5) No. 19 Duke; Quarterfinals	W 84–79 ^{OT}	21–10	Verizon Center (18,561); Washington, D.C.
Mar 11, 2016; 7:00 pm, ESPN	(4)	vs. (1) No. 7 North Carolina; Semifinals	L 47–78	21–11	Verizon Center (20,719); Washington, D.C.
NCAA tournament
Mar 18, 2016*; 9:40 pm, CBS	(6 E)	vs. (11 E) Michigan; First Round	W 70–63	22–11	Barclays Center (17,502); Brooklyn, NY
Mar 20, 2016*; 2:40 pm, CBS	(6 E)	vs. (14 E) Stephen F. Austin; Second Round	W 76–75	23–11	Barclays Center (17,401); Brooklyn, NY
Mar 25, 2016*; 7:27 pm, TBS	(6 E)	vs. (7 E) Wisconsin; Sweet Sixteen	W 61–56	24–11	Wells Fargo Center (20,686); Philadelphia, PA
Mar 27, 2016; 8:49 pm, TBS	(6 E)	vs. (1 E) No. 3 North Carolina; Elite Eight	L 74–88	24–12	Wells Fargo Center (20,743); Philadelphia, PA
*Non-conference game. ^{#}Rankings from AP Poll. (#) Tournament seedings in parentheses. E=East Region. All times are in Eastern Time. Source:

== Rankings ==
Ranking movement Legend: ██ Increase in ranking. ██ Decrease in ranking. ██ Not ranked the previous week. RV=Others receiving votes.
Poll	Pre	Wk 2	Wk 3	Wk 4	Wk 5	Wk 6	Wk 7	Wk 8	Wk 9	Wk 10	Wk 11	Wk 12	Wk 13	Wk 14	Wk 15	Wk 16	Wk 17	Wk 18	Post	Final
AP	19	18	17	RV	RV	RV	NR	NR	NR	NR	RV	25	RV	RV	19	23	RV	RV	RV	N/A
Coaches	18	18	18	RV	NR	RV	RV	RV	NR	NR	NR	RV	RV	RV	18	20	RV	RV	RV	17
