= 2013–14 Notre Dame Fighting Irish men's basketball team =

American college basketball season

2013–14 Notre Dame Fighting Irish men's basketball
- Conference: Atlantic Coast Conference
- Record: 15–17 (6–12 ACC)
- Head coach: Mike Brey
- Assistant coaches: Anthony Solomon; Rod Balanis; Martin Ingelsby
- Home arena: Purcell Pavilion at the Joyce Center

2013–14 ACC men's basketball standings
	Conf.				Overall
Team	W		L	PCT	W		L	PCT
No. 3 Virginia †	16	–	2	.889	30	–	7	.811
No. 14 Syracuse	14	–	4	.778	28	–	6	.824
No. 8 Duke	13	–	5	.722	26	–	9	.743
No. 19 North Carolina	13	–	5	.722	24	–	10	.706
Pittsburgh	11	–	7	.611	26	–	10	.722
Clemson	10	–	8	.556	23	–	13	.639
NC State	9	–	9	.500	22	–	14	.611
Maryland	9	–	9	.500	17	–	15	.531
Florida State	9	–	9	.500	22	–	14	.611
Miami (FL)	7	–	11	.389	17	–	16	.515
Wake Forest	6	–	12	.333	17	–	16	.515
Georgia Tech	6	–	12	.333	16	–	17	.485
Notre Dame	6	–	12	.333	15	–	17	.469
Boston College	4	–	14	.222	8	–	24	.250
Virginia Tech	2	–	16	.111	9	–	22	.290
† 2014 ACC tournament winner Rankings from AP poll

The 2013–14 Notre Dame Fighting Irish men's basketball team represented the University of Notre Dame during the 2013–14 NCAA Division I men's basketball season. The team played its home games at the Purcell Pavilion at the Joyce Center in South Bend, Indiana. This marked Notre Dame's inaugural season in the Atlantic Coast Conference, having moved from the Big East Conference. They finished the season 15–17, 6–12 in ACC play to finish in a three-way tie for 11th place. They lost in the first round of the ACC tournament Wake Forest.

== Previous season ==
The Fighting Irish finished the 2012–13 season 25–10, with an 11–7 record in Big East play. They reached the semifinals of the Big East tournament, which was their fourth consecutive trip to that round in their final appearance before departing to the ACC. However, for a third year in a row they were eliminated by Louisville. The Irish earned a #7 seed for the NCAA tournament, where they were eliminated in the second round by Iowa State.

Senior forward Jack Cooley was named First Team All-Big East, while junior guard Jerian Grant was named Second Team All-Big East. Additionally, sophomore guard Pat Connaughton was named to the Big East Championship All-Tournament Team, the first Irish player to be so honored since Scott Martin in 2011.

== Pre-season ==
On September 12, 2012, Notre Dame announced that they had accepted an invitation to join the ACC in all sports except for football. Discussions with both the Big East and the ACC eventually led to an agreement for the Irish to join the ACC starting with 2013-14 calendar year. Notre Dame basketball announced its first slate of conference games on April 23, 2013. As "partner schools" with Georgia Tech and Boston College, Notre Dame will always play home-and-away series with those two schools each year, and then play the remaining 11 ACC teams on a rotating basis as part of an 18-game conference schedule. The Irish were also scheduled for their first-ever game in the ACC-Big Ten Challenge. On May 8 it was confirmed their opponent in the 2013 Challenge would be Iowa. The full 2013–14 schedule was unveiled August 22. In the poll taken at ACC Media Days in October, the Irish were picked to finish fifth in their first season in the new conference.

Notre Dame recruited four players from the high school senior class of 2012–13, each of whom signed letters-of-intent in November 2012. The recruiting class, which featured three players from the state of Indiana, was ranked among the top 20 in the nation by Rivals.com, Scout.com, and ESPN.

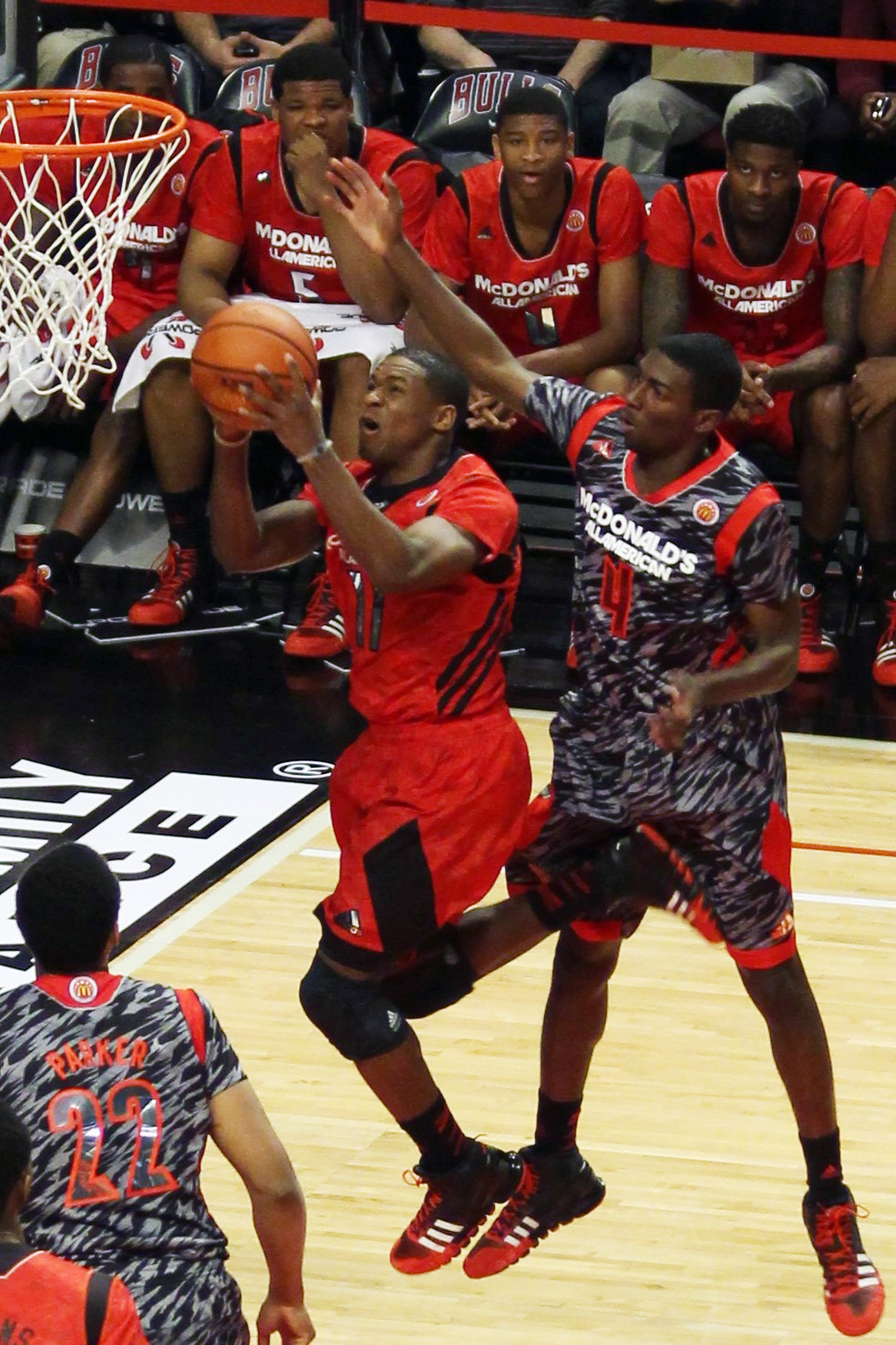
Demetrius Jackson in front of Isaac Hamilton in the 2013 McDonald's All-American Boys Game

College recruiting
Name	Hometown	School	Height	Weight	Commit date
V. J. Beachem; SF	Fort Wayne, IN	New Haven High School	6 ft 6 in (1.98 m)	180 lb (82 kg)	Oct 9, 2011
V. J. Beachem; SF	Recruit ratings: Scout: Rivals: (85)				
Demetrius Jackson; PG	Mishawaka, IN	Marian High School	6 ft 1 in (1.85 m)	185 lb (84 kg)	Sep 27, 2012
Demetrius Jackson; PG	Recruit ratings: Scout: Rivals: (89)				
Austin Torres; PF	Mishawaka, IN	Penn High School	6 ft 6 in (1.98 m)	200 lb (91 kg)	Oct 1, 2012
Austin Torres; PF	Recruit ratings: Scout: Rivals: (70)				
Steve Vasturia; SG	Philadelphia, PA	St. Joseph's Prep School	6 ft 5 in (1.96 m)	190 lb (86 kg)	Oct 31, 2011
Steve Vasturia; SG	Recruit ratings: Scout: Rivals: (79)				
Overall recruit ranking: Scout: 15 Rivals: 20 ESPN: 17
Note: In many cases, Scout, Rivals, 247Sports, On3, and ESPN may conflict in their listings of height and weight.; In these cases, the average was taken. ESPN grades are on a 100-point scale.; Sources: "Notre Dame 2013 Basketball Commitments". Rivals.; "2013 Notre Dame Commits". Scout.; "2013 Player Commitments – Notre Dame". ESPN.; "Scout.com Team Recruiting Rankings". Scout.; "2013 Team Ranking". Rivals.

During preseason practices, the Irish suffered two notable injuries in their sophomore class. First, forward Zach Auguste suffered a broken wrist on October 10. Initially expected to be out for up to six weeks, he was ready by the time of the season opener on November 8. On October 26, the school confirmed sophomore Eric Katenda underwent knee surgery that will keep him out for up to six weeks.

When the preseason rankings were released by two major college basketball polls, Notre Dame was #21 in the AP poll and #22 by the USA Today/Coaches Poll.

== Roster ==
2013–14 Notre Dame Fighting Irish men's basketball team
Players
Coaches

Pos.	#	Name	Height	Weight	Year	Previous school	Hometown
G	0	Eric Atkins (C)	6 ft 2 in (1.88 m)	182 lb (83 kg)	Sr	Mount Saint Joseph	Columbia, Maryland
F	1	Cameron Biedscheid (redshirt)	6 ft 7 in (2.01 m)	186 lb (84 kg)	So	Cardinal Ritter	St. Louis, Missouri
F	3	V. J. Beachem	6 ft 8 in (2.03 m)	187 lb (85 kg)	Fr	New Haven	Fort Wayne, Indiana
G	4	Patrick Crowley	6 ft 3 in (1.91 m)	195 lb (88 kg)	Sr	St. Francis	Los Gatos, California
C	11	Garrick Sherman (C)	6 ft 10 in (2.08 m)	246 lb (112 kg)	Sr	Kenton / Michigan State	Kenton, Ohio
F	15	Eric Katenda	6 ft 9 in (2.06 m)	222 lb (101 kg)	So	Sunrise Academy (KS)	Paris, France
F	20	Austin Burgett	6 ft 9 in (2.06 m)	214 lb (97 kg)	So	Avon	Avon, Indiana
G	22	Jerian Grant (I)	6 ft 5 in (1.96 m)	195 lb (88 kg)	Sr	DeMatha	Bowie, Maryland
G	23	Demetrius Jackson	6 ft 1 in (1.85 m)	195 lb (88 kg)	Fr	Marian	Mishawaka, Indiana
G/F	24	Pat Connaughton (C)	6 ft 5 in (1.96 m)	206 lb (93 kg)	Jr	St. John's Prep	Arlington, Massachusetts
F	25	Tom Knight (C)	6 ft 9 in (2.06 m)	250 lb (113 kg)	Sr	Dirigo	Dixfield, Maine
F	30	Zach Auguste	6 ft 10 in (2.08 m)	230 lb (104 kg)	So	New Hampton	Marlborough, Massachusetts
G	32	Steve Vasturia	6 ft 1 in (1.85 m)	195 lb (88 kg)	Fr	St. Joseph's Prep	Medford, New Jersey
F	35	Austin Torres (redshirt)	6 ft 7 in (2.01 m)	218 lb (99 kg)	Fr	Penn	Granger, Indiana

Head coach

- Mike Brey

Assistant coach(es)

- Anthony Solomon
- Rod Balanis
- Martin Ingelsby

Legend

- (C) Team captain
- (S) Suspended
- (I) Ineligible
- (W) Walk-on
- Injured
- Current redshirt

Roster
Last update: 2013-11-01

The school announced on November 8 that sophomore Cameron Biedschied will sit out the 2013–14 season. Biedschied had no injury issues necessitating the redshirt, but arrived at the decision with Coach Brey that he would benefit academically and athletically by sitting out a year, citing specifically his struggles in conference play during his freshman year. On December 26, however, after the fall semester concluded, Biedscheid requested and received permission to contact other schools in order to transfer.

On December 22, the school announced that Jerian Grant would be suspended for the remainder of the 2013–14 season due to an "academic matter". Grant wrote in a note posted on the school's athletic website that, "It is my full intention to return to Notre Dame as soon as possible following the 2014 spring semester. I intend to do whatever it takes to earn my degree and finish out my college basketball career here."

== Schedule and results ==
Date time, TV	Rank^{#}	Opponent^{#}	Result	Record	Site (attendance) city, state
Exhibition
October 28, 2013; 7:00 pm		Indianapolis	W 95–69		Purcell Pavilion (7,212); South Bend, IN
November 1, 2013; 9:00 pm		Tusculum	W 93–44		Purcell Pavilion (8,134); South Bend, IN
Regular season
November 8, 2013*; 7:00 pm, ESPN3	No. 21	Miami (OH)	W 74–62	1–0	Purcell Pavilion (7,783); South Bend, IN
November 10, 2013*; 1:00 pm, ESPN3	No. 21	Stetson	W 80–49	2–0	Purcell Pavilion (7,854); South Bend, IN
November 17, 2013*; 12:00 pm, ESPN3	No. 21	Indiana State	L 70–83	2–1	Purcell Pavilion (8,257); South Bend, IN
November 22, 2013*; 9:00 pm, ESPN3		Santa Clara	W 84–69	3–1	Purcell Pavilion (9,149); South Bend, IN
November 24, 2013*; 2:00 pm, ESPN3		Army	W 93–60	4–1	Purcell Pavilion (8,941); South Bend, IN
December 1, 2013*; 1:00 pm, ESPN3		Cornell	W 101–67	5–1	Purcell Pavilion (8,636); South Bend, IN
December 3, 2013*; 9:15 pm, ESPN2		at No. 23 Iowa; ACC-Big Ten Challenge	L 93–98	5–2	Carver-Hawkeye Arena (15,400); Iowa City, IA
December 7, 2013*; 4:00 pm, ACCRSN		Delaware; Gotham Classic	W 80–75	6–2	Purcell Pavilion (8,157); South Bend, IN
December 9, 2013*; 7:00 pm, ESPNU		Bryant; Gotham Classic	W 70–59	7–2	Purcell Pavilion (7,323); South Bend, IN
December 11, 2013*; 7:00 pm, ESPNU		North Dakota State; Gotham Classic	L 69–73	7–3	Purcell Pavilion (7,662); South Bend, IN
December 14, 2013*; 3:15 pm, ESPN		vs. Indiana; Crossroads Classic	W 79–72	8–3	Bankers Life Fieldhouse (18,165); Indianapolis, IN
December 21, 2013*; 7:30 pm, ESPN2		vs. No. 3 Ohio State; Gotham Classic	L 61–64	8–4	Madison Square Garden (10,138); New York, NY
December 29, 2013*; 5:00 pm, ESPNU		Canisius	W 87–81 ^{OT}	9–4	Purcell Pavilion (8,400); South Bend, IN
ACC Regular Season
January 4, 2014; 4:00 pm, CBS		No. 7 Duke	W 79–77	10–4 (1–0)	Purcell Pavilion (9,149); South Bend, IN
January 7, 2014; 9:00 pm, ACC Network		NC State	L 70–77	10–5 (1–1)	Purcell Pavilion (7,721); South Bend, IN
January 11, 2014; 12:00 pm, ACC Network		at Georgia Tech	L 69–74	10–6 (1–2)	McCamish Pavilion (7,727); Atlanta, GA
January 15, 2014; 7:00 pm, ESPN2		at Maryland	L 66–74	10–7 (1–3)	Comcast Center (13,878); College Park, MD
January 19, 2014; 6:00 pm, ESPNU		Virginia Tech	W 70–63	11–7 (2–3)	Purcell Pavilion (8,849); South Bend, IN
January 21, 2014; 8:00 pm, ACC Network		at Florida State	L 74–76	11–8 (2–4)	Donald L. Tucker Center (7,799); Tallahassee, FL
January 25, 2014; 3:00 pm, ACC Network		at Wake Forest	L 58–65	11–9 (2–5)	LJVM Coliseum (11,710); Winston-Salem, NC
January 28, 2014; 9:00 pm, ESPNU		Virginia	L 53–68	11–10 (2–6)	Purcell Pavilion (7,565); South Bend, IN
February 1, 2014; 12:00 pm, ACC Network		Boston College	W 76–73 ^{OT}	12–10 (3–6)	Purcell Pavilion (8,955); South Bend, IN
February 3, 2014; 7:00 pm, ESPN		at No. 1 Syracuse	L 55–61	12–11 (3–7)	Carrier Dome (25,850); Syracuse, NY
February 8, 2014; 12:00 pm, ACC Network		North Carolina	L 62–73	12–12 (3–8)	Purcell Pavilion (9,149); South Bend, IN
February 11, 2014; 7:00 pm, ACCRSN		Clemson	W 68–64 ^{2OT}	13–12 (4–8)	Purcell Pavilion (8,119); South Bend, IN
February 16, 2014; 6:00 pm, ESPNU		at Boston College	W 73–69	14–12 (5–8)	Conte Forum (7,138); Chestnut Hill, MA
February 19, 2014; 9:00 pm, ACCRSN		at Miami (FL)	L 64–71	14–13 (5–9)	BankUnited Center (5,133); Coral Gables, FL
February 22, 2014; 6:00 pm, ESPN2		at No. 14 Virginia	L 49–70	14–14 (5–10)	John Paul Jones Arena (14,114); Charlottesville, VA
February 26, 2014; 7:00 pm, ESPN2		Georgia Tech	W 65–62	15–14 (6–10)	Purcell Pavilion (8,127); South Bend, IN
March 1, 2014; 2:00 pm, ESPN2		Pittsburgh	L 81-85 ^{OT}	15–15 (6–11)	Purcell Pavilion (9,149); South Bend, IN
March 3, 2014; 7:00 pm, ESPN		at North Carolina	L 61-63	15–16 (6–12)	Dean Smith Center (15,175); Chapel Hill, NC
ACC Tournament
March 12, 2014; 1:00 pm, ESPNU/ACC Network		vs. Wake Forest; First round	L 69–81	15–17	Greensboro Coliseum (10,945); Greensboro, NC
*Non-conference game. ^{#}Rankings from AP Poll. (#) Tournament seedings in parentheses. All times are in Eastern Time.

== See also ==
2013–14 Notre Dame Fighting Irish women's basketball team
