= 2013–14 NC State Wolfpack men's basketball team =

American college basketball season

2013–14 NC State Wolfpack men's basketball

NCAA tournament, round of 64
- Conference: Atlantic Coast Conference
- Record: 22–14 (9–9 ACC)
- Head coach: Mark Gottfried (3rd season)
- Assistant coaches: Orlando Early; Bobby Lutz; Rob Moxley
- Home arena: PNC Arena

2013–14 ACC men's basketball standings
	Conf.				Overall
Team	W		L	PCT	W		L	PCT
No. 3 Virginia †	16	–	2	.889	30	–	7	.811
No. 14 Syracuse	14	–	4	.778	28	–	6	.824
No. 8 Duke	13	–	5	.722	26	–	9	.743
No. 19 North Carolina	13	–	5	.722	24	–	10	.706
Pittsburgh	11	–	7	.611	26	–	10	.722
Clemson	10	–	8	.556	23	–	13	.639
NC State	9	–	9	.500	22	–	14	.611
Maryland	9	–	9	.500	17	–	15	.531
Florida State	9	–	9	.500	22	–	14	.611
Miami (FL)	7	–	11	.389	17	–	16	.515
Wake Forest	6	–	12	.333	17	–	16	.515
Georgia Tech	6	–	12	.333	16	–	17	.485
Notre Dame	6	–	12	.333	15	–	17	.469
Boston College	4	–	14	.222	8	–	24	.250
Virginia Tech	2	–	16	.111	9	–	22	.290
† 2014 ACC tournament winner Rankings from AP poll

The 2013–14 NC State Wolfpack men's basketball team represented North Carolina State University during the 2013–14 NCAA Division I men's basketball season. The Wolfpack, led by third year head coach Mark Gottfried, played their home games at PNC Arena and were members of the Atlantic Coast Conference. They finished the season 22–14, 9–9 in ACC play to finish in a three way tie for seventh place. They advanced to the semifinals of the ACC tournament where they lost to Duke. They received an at-large bid to the NCAA tournament where they defeated Xavier in the First Four before losing in the second round to Saint Louis. T. J. Warren, who led the ACC in scoring, was voted ACC player of the year for 2013–14.

== Off season ==
=== Departures ===
Name	Number	Pos.	Height	Weight	Year	Hometown	Notes
Richard Howell	1	F	6'8"	257	Senior	Marietta, Georgia	Graduated
Scott Wood	15	F	6'6"	169	Senior	Marion, Indiana	Graduated
Jay Lewis	20	G	6'1"	198	Senior	Greensboro, North Carolina	Graduated
Lorenzo Brown	2	G	6'5"	186	Junior	Roswell, Georgia	Entered 2013 NBA draft
C. J. Leslie	5	F	6'9"	200	Junior	Holly Springs, North Carolina	Entered 2013 NBA draft
Rodney Purvis	0	G	6'3"	195	Freshman	Raleigh, North Carolina	Transferred to Connecticut

=== Class of 2013 signees ===
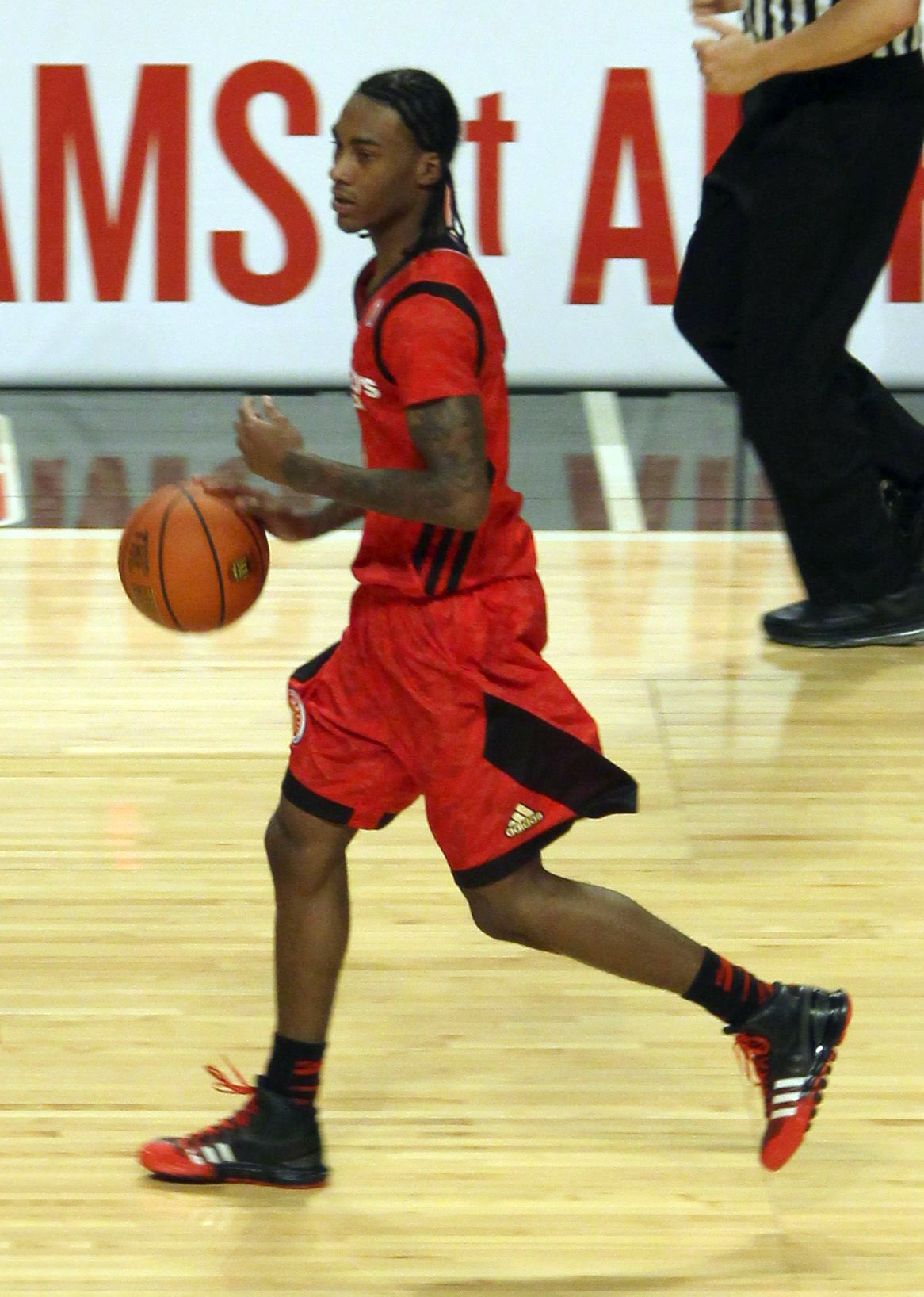
Cat Barber in the 2013 McDonald's All-American Boys Game

College recruiting information
Name	Hometown	School	Height	Weight	Commit date
Cat Barber; PG	Hampton, VA	Hampton	6 ft 2 in (1.88 m)	165 lb (75 kg)	Sep 15, 2012
Cat Barber; PG	Recruit ratings: Scout: Rivals: (89)				
BeeJay Anya; C	Germantown, MD	DeMatha Catholic	6 ft 9 in (2.06 m)	275 lb (125 kg)	Nov 16, 2012
BeeJay Anya; C	Recruit ratings: Scout: Rivals: (86)				
Kyle Washington; PF	Champlin, MN	Brewster Academy (NH)	6 ft 9 in (2.06 m)	215 lb (98 kg)	Sep 23, 2012
Kyle Washington; PF	Recruit ratings: Scout: Rivals: (82)				
Lennard Freeman; PF	Washington, DC	Oak Hill Academy (VA)	6 ft 8 in (2.03 m)	225 lb (102 kg)	Apr 29, 2013
Lennard Freeman; PF	Recruit ratings: Scout: Rivals: (72)				
Overall recruit ranking:
Note: In many cases, Scout, Rivals, 247Sports, On3, and ESPN may conflict in their listings of height and weight.; In these cases, the average was taken. ESPN grades are on a 100-point scale.; Sources: "2013 NC State Basketball Commits". Scout.; "ESPN". ESPN.; "Scout.com Team Recruiting Rankings". Scout.; "2013 Team Ranking". Rivals.

== Roster ==
2013–14 NC State Wolfpack men's basketball team
Players
Coaches

Pos.	#	Name	Height	Weight	Year	Hometown
G	1	Trevor Lacey (redshirt)	6 ft 3 in (1.91 m)	220 lb (100 kg)	Jr	Huntsville, Alabama
G	2	Cat Barber	6 ft 2 in (1.88 m)	170 lb (77 kg)	Fr	Newport News, Virginia
G	5	Desmond Lee	6 ft 4 in (1.93 m)	200 lb (91 kg)	Jr	Norfolk, Virginia
F	10	Lennard Freeman	6 ft 8 in (2.03 m)	245 lb (111 kg)	Fr	Washington, D.C.
G	12	Tyler Lewis	5 ft 11 in (1.8 m)	170 lb (77 kg)	So	Statesville, North Carolina
C	14	Jordan Vandenberg	7 ft 1 in (2.16 m)	245 lb (111 kg)	RS Sr	Melbourne, Australia
F	15	Chris Brickhouse (W)	6 ft 5 in (1.96 m)	205 lb (93 kg)	Fr	Raleigh, North Carolina
F	20	Patrick Wallace (W)	6 ft 1 in (1.85 m)	195 lb (88 kg)	Fr	Charlotte, North Carolina
F	21	BeeJay Anya	6 ft 9 in (2.06 m)	325 lb (147 kg)	Fr	Gaithersburg, Maryland
G	22	Ralston Turner	6 ft 5 in (1.96 m)	205 lb (93 kg)	RS Jr	Muscle Shoals, Alabama
F	24	T. J. Warren	6 ft 8 in (2.03 m)	215 lb (98 kg)	So	Durham, North Carolina
G	25	Chase Cannon	6 ft 4 in (1.93 m)	200 lb (91 kg)	So	Morehead City, North Carolina
G	30	Staats Battle	6 ft 6 in (1.98 m)	200 lb (91 kg)	Jr	Raleigh, North Carolina
F	32	Kyle Washington	6 ft 9 in (2.06 m)	225 lb (102 kg)	Fr	Champlin, Minnesota
F	34	Jevoni Robinson	6 ft 8 in (2.03 m)	225 lb (102 kg)	Jr	Charlotte, North Carolina

Head coach

- Mark Gottfried (Alabama)

Assistant coach(es)

- Orlando Early (Gardner–Webb)
- Bobby Lutz (Charlotte)
- Rob Moxley (Pfeiffer)

Legend

- (C) Team captain
- (S) Suspended
- (I) Ineligible
- (W) Walk-on
- Injured
- Current redshirt

Roster

== Schedule and results ==
Date time, TV	Rank^{#}	Opponent^{#}	Result	Record	High points	High rebounds	High assists	Site (attendance) city, state
Exhibition
Oct 30*; 7:00 pm		UNC Pembroke	W 96–85	–	26 – Warren	10 – Warren	15 – Lewis	Reynolds Coliseum (2,530); Raleigh, NC
Nov 3*; 5:00 pm		Morehouse	W 87–62	–	26 – Warren	10 – Warren	6 – Barber	PNC Arena (5,297); Raleigh, NC
Non-conference regular season
Nov 8*; 7:00 pm, ESPN3		Appalachian State	W 98–77	1–0	27 – Warren	8 – Warren	6 – Tied	PNC Arena (13,164); Raleigh, NC
Nov 12*; 5:00 pm, ESPN		at Cincinnati	L 57–68	1–1	13 – Tied	10 – Warren	3 – Lewis	Fifth Third Arena (7,028); Cincinnati, OH
Nov 16*; 7:00 pm, ESPN3		Campbell	W 81–66	2–1	23 – Warren	8 – Lewis	9 – Lewis	PNC Arena (13,143); Raleigh, NC
Nov 20*; 7:00 pm, ESFC		North Carolina Central	L 72–82 ^{OT}	2–2	22 – Barber	8 – Lee	3 – Barber	PNC Arena (9,754); Raleigh, NC
Nov 26*; 7:00 pm, ESPN3		Florida Gulf Coast	W 75–56	3–2	30 – Warren	10 – Vandenberg	6 – Barber	PNC Arena (11,123); Raleigh, NC
Nov 30*; 8:00 pm, ESPN3		Eastern Kentucky	W 75–56	4–2	30 – Warren	11 – Warren	5 – Tied	PNC Arena (10,221); Raleigh, NC
Dec 4*; 7:30 pm, ESPNU		Northwestern; ACC–Big Ten Challenge	W 69–48	5–2	22 – Warren	10 – Freeman	7 – Lewis	PNC Arena (11,459); Raleigh, NC
Dec 7*; 2:00 pm, ESPN3		Long Beach State	W 76–66	6–2	23 – Warren	13 – Freeman	4 – Tied	PNC Arena (10,616); Raleigh, NC
Dec 14*; 6:00 pm, ESPN3		Detroit	W 82–79	7–2	29 – Warren	9 – Freeman	7 – Lewis	Reynolds Coliseum (5,758); Raleigh, NC
Dec 18*; 7:00 pm, ESPNU		at Tennessee	W 65–58	8–2	21 – Warren	11 – Warren	4 – Barber	Thompson–Boling Arena (14,831); Knoxville, TN
Dec 21*; 12:00 pm, ESPN3		East Carolina	W 90–79	9–2	32 – Warren	8 – Warren	8 – Barber	PNC Arena (15,217); Raleigh, NC
Dec 28*; 8:00 pm, ESPN2		No. 25 Missouri	L 64–68	9–3	24 – Warren	13 – Warren	6 – Barber	PNC Arena (16,419); Raleigh, NC
Dec 30*; 7:00 pm, ESPN3		at UNC Greensboro	W 68–64	10–3	24 – Warren	9 – Warren	6 – Barber	Greensboro Coliseum (5,989); Greensboro, NC
ACC regular season
Jan 4; 12:00 pm, ESPN3		Pittsburgh	L 62–74	10–4 (0–1)	23 – Warren	8 – Warren	7 – Barber	PNC Arena (14,049); Raleigh, NC
Jan 7; 9:00 pm, ESPN3		at Notre Dame	W 77–70	11–4 (1–1)	17 – Warren	11 – Vandenberg	4 – Lewis	Edmund P. Joyce Center (7,721); South Bend, IN
Jan 11; 5:00 pm, ESPN2		Virginia	L 45–76	11–5 (1–2)	10 – Tied	5 – Tied	2 – Lewis	PNC Arena (15,623); Raleigh, NC
Jan 15; 9:00 pm, ESPN3		at Wake Forest; Tobacco Road	L 69–70	11–6 (1–3)	22 – Warren	5 – Tied	4 – Barber	LJVM Coliseum (10,881); Winston-Salem, NC
Jan 18; 2:00 pm, CBS		at No. 23 Duke; Tobacco Road	L 60–95	11–7 (1–4)	23 – Warren	8 – Warren	3 – Tied	Cameron Indoor Stadium (9,314); Durham, NC
Jan 20; 9:00 pm, ESPNU		Maryland	W 65–56	12–7 (2–4)	23 – Turner	10 – Washington	4 – Barber	PNC Arena (11,447); Raleigh, NC
Jan 26; 1:00 pm, ESPN3		Georgia Tech	W 80–78 ^{OT}	13–7 (3–4)	20 – Warren	6 – Warren	5 – Barber	PNC Arena (14,120); Raleigh, NC
Jan 29; 9:00 pm, ESPN3		Florida State	W 74–70	14–7 (4–4)	30 – Warren	7 – Warren	4 – Barber	PNC Arena (7,005); Raleigh, NC
Feb 1; 2:00 pm, ESPN2		at North Carolina; Carolina–State Game, Tobacco Road	L 70–84	14–8 (4–5)	21 – Warren	8 – Warren	3 – Lee	Dean Smith Center (21,750); Chapel Hill, NC
Feb 8; 2:00 pm, ESPN3		at Miami (FL)	W 56–55	15–8 (5–5)	27 – Warren	7 – Warren	3 – Tied	BankUnited Center (6,666); Coral Gables, FL
Feb 11; 7:00 pm, ESPNU		Wake Forest; Tobacco Road	W 82–67	16–8 (6–5)	34 – Warren	10 – Warren	7 – Lewis	PNC Arena (13,316); Raleigh, NC
Feb 15; 3:00 pm, ESPN3		at No. 1 Syracuse	L 55–56	16–9 (6–6)	23 – Warren	10 – Washington	6 – Lewis	Carrier Dome (31,572); Syracuse, NY
Feb 18; 7:00 pm, ESPNU		at Clemson	W 73–56	16–10 (6–7)	20 – Warren	5 – Warren	5 – Barber	Littlejohn Coliseum (6,987); Clemson, SC
Feb 22; 2:00 pm, ESPN3		at Virginia Tech	W 71–64	17–10 (7–7)	31 – Warren	6 – Warren	11 – Lewis	Cassell Coliseum (5,268); Blacksburg, VA
Feb 26; 8:00 pm, ESPN3		No. 19 North Carolina; Carolina–State Game, Tobacco Road	L 84–85 ^{OT}	17–11 (7–8)	36 – Warren	10 – Washington	6 – Lewis	PNC Arena (19,500); Raleigh, NC
Mar 1; 12:00 pm, ESPN3		Miami (FL)	L 70–85	17–12 (7–9)	20 – Warren	7 – Warren	3 – Vandenberg	PNC Arena (13,932); Raleigh, NC
Mar 3; 9:00 pm, ESPNU		at Pittsburgh	W 74–67	18–12 (8–9)	41 – Warren	8 – Freeman	5 – Barber	Petersen Events Center (12,508); Pittsburgh, PA
Mar 9; 6:00 pm, ESPNU		Boston College	W 78–68	19–12 (9–9)	42 – Warren	13 – Warren	5 – Lewis	PNC Arena (14,316); Raleigh, NC
ACC Tournament
Mar 13; 7:00 pm, ESPNU/ACC Network		vs. Miami (FL); Second round	W 67–58	20–12	24 – Warren	8 – Tied	7 – Barber	Greensboro Coliseum (21,533); Greensboro, NC
Mar 14; 7:00 pm, ESPNU/ACC Network		vs. No. 11 Syracuse; Quarterfinals	W 66–63	21–12	28 – Warren	8 – Warren	6 – Barber	Greensboro Coliseum (21,533); Greensboro, NC
Mar 15; 3:00 pm, ESPNU/ACC Network		vs. No. 7 Duke; Semifinals	L 67–75	21–13	21 – Warren	9 – Freeman	5 – Lewis	Greensboro Coliseum (21,533); Greensboro, NC
NCAA tournament
Mar 18*; 9:10 pm, truTV	(12 MW)	vs. (12 MW) Xavier; First Four	W 74–59	22–13	25 – Warren	6 – Freeman	8 – Lewis	UD Arena (12,077); Dayton, OH
Mar 20*; 7:20 pm, TNT	(12 MW)	vs. (5 MW) No. 25 Saint Louis; Second round	L 80–83 ^{OT}	22–14	28 – Warren	9 – Freeman	6 – Lewis	Amway Center (14,866); Orlando, FL
*Non-conference game. ^{#}Rankings from AP Poll. (#) Tournament seedings in parentheses. All times are in Eastern Time. During NCAA Tournament (#) is seed within region MW=Midwest.
