= Demetrius Jackson =

American basketball player (born 1994)

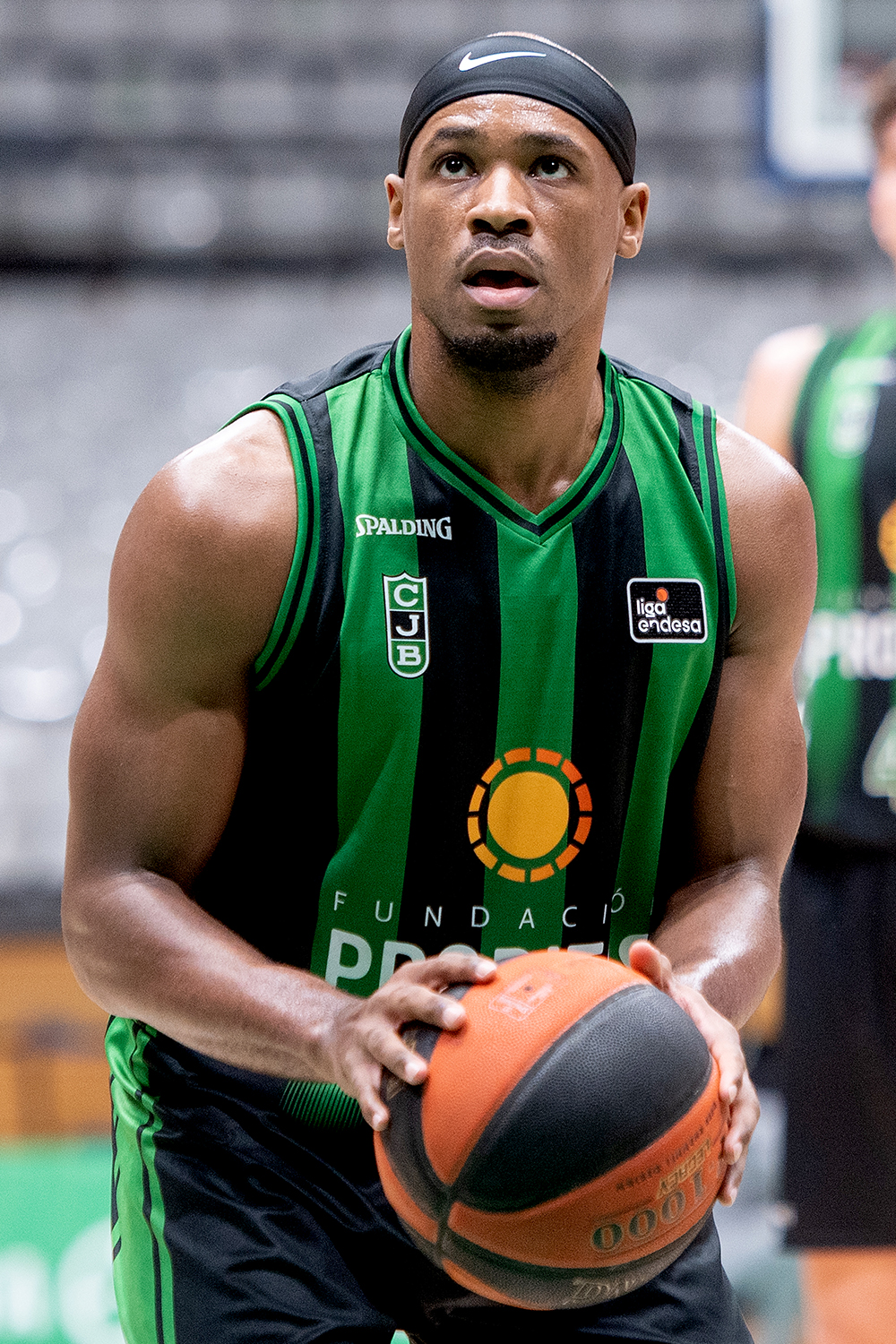
- Jackson with Club Joventut Badalona in 2021

Personal information
- Born: September 7, 1994 (age 32) South Bend, Indiana, U.S.
- Listed height: 6 ft 1 in (1.85 m)
- Listed weight: 205 lb (93 kg)

Career information
- High school: Marian (Mishawaka, Indiana)
- College: Notre Dame (2013–2016)
- NBA draft: 2016: 2nd round, 45th overall pick
- Drafted by: Boston Celtics
- Playing career: 2016–2021
- Position: Point guard

Career history
- 2016–2017: Boston Celtics
- 2016–2017: →Maine Red Claws
- 2017–2018: Houston Rockets
- 2017–2018: →Rio Grande Valley Vipers
- 2018–2019: Philadelphia 76ers
- 2018–2019: →Delaware 87ers/Blue Coats
- 2019–2020: South Bay Lakers
- 2020: Rytas Vilnius
- 2021: Club Joventut Badalona

Career highlights
- Second-team All-ACC (2016); McDonald's All-American (2013)
- Stats at NBA.com
- Stats at Basketball Reference

Demetrius Montell Jackson Jr. (born September 7, 1994) is an American former professional basketball player. He played three seasons of college basketball for the University of Notre Dame before being drafted 45th overall by the Celtics in the 2016 NBA draft.

== High school career ==
Jackson played high school basketball for Marian High School. As a junior, he averaged 22.3 points per game, 6.6 rebounds per game, 4.4 assists per game, and 2.0 steals per game; led his school to sectional championship; and was named to the All-State Underclass First Team. As a senior, Jackson averaged 25.9 points, 5.7 rebounds, 2.9 assists, and 2.6 steals per game, finishing as runner-up for the Indiana Mr. Basketball to Zak Irvin. He concluded his career at Marian as the all-time leading scorer in St. Joseph County with 1,934 career points. His performances with Marian earned him a selection for the 2013 McDonald's All-American Boys Game, and he was the first Northern Indiana native to receive this honor since Shawn Kemp in 1988. Jackson finished the game with 5 points, 4 assists, and 2 steals and won the Jack Daly Sportmanship Award and the Skills Competition.

College recruiting
Name	Hometown	School	Height	Weight	Commit date
Demetrius Jackson; PG	Mishawaka, IN	Marian	6 ft 1 in (1.85 m)	195 lb (88 kg)	Sep 23, 2011
Demetrius Jackson; PG	Recruit ratings: Scout: Rivals: 247Sports: (89)				
Overall recruit ranking: Scout: 29, 6 (PG) Rivals: 38, 9 (PG) 247Sports: 34, 8 (PG) ESPN: 24, 6 (PG)
Note: In many cases, Scout, Rivals, 247Sports, On3, and ESPN may conflict in their listings of height and weight.; In these cases, the average was taken. ESPN grades are on a 100-point scale.; Sources: "Notre Dame 2013 Basketball Commitments". Rivals.; "2013 Notre Dame Commits". Scout.; "2013 Player Commitments – Notre Dame". ESPN.; "Scout.com Team Recruiting Rankings". Scout.; "2013 Team Ranking". Rivals.

== College career ==
=== Freshman season ===
Jackson committed to play for Notre Dame, under coach Mike Brey. In his freshman season he was expected to back up guards Eric Atkins and Jerian Grant. Jackson commented on the situation, saying that although he had been apprehensive to play along a senior point guard, he realized that it would benefit his game. He scored in double digits for the first time versus Santa Clara, tallying 13 points. In February, he missed two games in order to deal with academic issues. Upon returning to the team, he scored a season-high 17 points against Miami. He concluded the season having started half of his 30 games and averaging 6.0 points, 2.1 rebounds, and 1.8 assists per game.

=== Sophomore season ===
In his sophomore season, Jackson scored a career-high 22 points against Michigan State; this was the first meeting between the schools in 35 years. A couple of weeks later, he tied this mark against Purdue. Jackson produced solid performances for the Irish in the 2015 ACC tournament against Miami, Duke, and North Carolina and he was eventually named to the All-ACC Tournament second team. He helped his team proceed to the Elite 8 of the 2015 NCAA tournament by scoring 20 points against Wichita State. Throughout the season, he averaged 12.4 points, 3.6 rebounds, 3.1 assists, and 1.6 steals per game, appearing in all 38 games of his team. On April 14, 2015, it was reported by ESPN that Jackson would return to the Fighting Irish squad for his junior season.

=== Junior season ===
On February 1, 2016, he was named one of 10 finalists for the Bob Cousy Point Guard of the Year Award. He was named to the 35-man midseason watchlist for the Naismith Trophy on February 11.

On March 29, 2016, Jackson declared for the NBA draft, forgoing his final year of college eligibility.

== Professional career ==
=== Boston Celtics (2016–2017) ===
On June 23, 2016, Jackson was selected by the Boston Celtics with the 45th overall pick in the 2016 NBA draft. On July 27, 2016, he signed with the Celtics. On November 6, he made his professional debut in a 123–107 loss to the Denver Nuggets, recording eight points, three rebound and two assists in 11 minutes off the bench. During his rookie season, he has received multiple assignments to the Maine Red Claws, the Celtics' D-League affiliate. On July 15, 2017, Jackson was waived by the Celtics.

=== Houston Rockets (2017–2018) ===
On August 21, 2017, Jackson signed a two-way contract by the Houston Rockets. Under the terms of the deal, he split time between the Rockets and their G League affiliate, the Rio Grande Valley Vipers, becoming the first player in franchise history to sign such a deal. While he got playing time in Houston early in the season due to an injury to Chris Paul, his playing time declined in the weeks following Paul's return. As a result, his two-way contract with Houston was terminated on January 6, 2018, although he would sign a 10-day contract with the Rockets the same day. He was assigned to Rio Grande Valley immediately and took part in the 2018 G League Showcase.

=== Philadelphia 76ers (2018–2019) ===
On January 14, 2018, Jackson was signed to a two-way contract with the Philadelphia 76ers and NBA G League affiliate the Delaware 87ers. He was re-signed to a second two-way deal for the 2018–19 season.

=== South Bay Lakers (2019–2020) ===
On August 13, 2019, the Los Angeles Lakers announced that they had signed Jackson. On October 21, 2019, Jackson was waived by the Lakers. He was then added to the roster of the South Bay Lakers.

=== Rytas Vilnius (2020) ===
On August 8, 2020, Jackson signed with Rytas Vilnius of the Lithuanian Basketball League (LKL). On October 1, 2020, after averaging 13 points, 4.5 rebounds, and 8.5 assists per game, Jackson was named the Lithuanian League MVP of September. On October 30, 2020, Jackson terminated his contract with Rytas Vilnius due to undisclosed family circumstances, possibly related with health concerns as the club sincerely wished good health to his relatives.

=== Joventut Badalona (2021) ===
On January 29, 2021, Jackson signed with Joventut Badalona of the Spanish Liga ACB.

== Career statistics ==
Legend
GP	Games played	GS	Games started	MPG	Minutes per game
FG%	Field goal percentage	3P%	3-point field goal percentage	FT%	Free throw percentage
RPG	Rebounds per game	APG	Assists per game	SPG	Steals per game
BPG	Blocks per game	PPG	Points per game	**Bold**	Career high

=== NBA ===
==== Regular season ====
Year	Team	GP	GS	MPG	FG%	3P%	FT%	RPG	APG	SPG	BPG	PPG
2016–17	Boston	5	0	3.4	**.750**	**1.000**	.500	.8	.6	.0	.0	2.0
2017–18	Houston	**12**	0	5.3	.286	.000	–	**.9**	.4	**.3**	**.1**	.7
2017–18	Philadelphia	3	0	5.7	**.750**	**1.000**	.500	.3	**1.3**	**.3**	.0	2.7
2018–19	Philadelphia	6	0	**6.5**	.533	.333	**1.000**	.5	.8	**.3**	.0	**3.7**
Career		26	0	5.2	.486	.286	.667	.7	.7	.3	.0	1.8

=== College ===
Year	Team	GP	GS	MPG	FG%	3P%	FT%	RPG	APG	SPG	BPG	PPG
2013–14	Notre Dame	30	15	22.2	.420	.417	.780	2.1	1.8	.4	.0	6.0
2014–15	Notre Dame	**38**	**38**	34.7	**.508**	**.429**	.745	**3.6**	3.1	**1.6**	**.3**	12.4
2015–16	Notre Dame	35	35	**36.0**	.451	.331	**.813**	3.5	**4.7**	1.2	**.3**	**15.8**
Career		103	88	31.5	.467	.381	.782	3.1	3.3	1.1	.2	11.7

== Personal life ==
Jackson, a South Bend native, is the son of Juanita Jones. Jackson lived in two different foster homes after the age of twelve, before finally settling with the Whitfields, the family of then basketball teammate Michael Whitfield. As a student in the University of Notre Dame, he enrolled in the College of Arts and Letters. Under Amour Basketball signed him as a brand representative along with AdvoCare.
