= 2013–14 Florida State Seminoles men's basketball team =

American college basketball season

2013–14 Florida State Seminoles men's basketball

NIT Semifinals vs. Minnesota, L, 64–67 (OT)
- Conference: Atlantic Coast Conference
- Record: 22–14 (9–9 ACC)
- Head coach: Leonard Hamilton (12th year)
- Assistant coaches: Stan Jones; Dennis Gates; Charlton Young
- Home arena: Donald L. Tucker Center (Capacity: 12,100)

2013–14 ACC men's basketball standings
	Conf.				Overall
Team	W		L	PCT	W		L	PCT
No. 3 Virginia †	16	–	2	.889	30	–	7	.811
No. 14 Syracuse	14	–	4	.778	28	–	6	.824
No. 8 Duke	13	–	5	.722	26	–	9	.743
No. 19 North Carolina	13	–	5	.722	24	–	10	.706
Pittsburgh	11	–	7	.611	26	–	10	.722
Clemson	10	–	8	.556	23	–	13	.639
NC State	9	–	9	.500	22	–	14	.611
Maryland	9	–	9	.500	17	–	15	.531
Florida State	9	–	9	.500	22	–	14	.611
Miami (FL)	7	–	11	.389	17	–	16	.515
Wake Forest	6	–	12	.333	17	–	16	.515
Georgia Tech	6	–	12	.333	16	–	17	.485
Notre Dame	6	–	12	.333	15	–	17	.469
Boston College	4	–	14	.222	8	–	24	.250
Virginia Tech	2	–	16	.111	9	–	22	.290
† 2014 ACC tournament winner Rankings from AP poll

The 2013–14 Florida State Seminoles men's basketball team, variously Florida State or FSU, represented Florida State University during the 2013–14 NCAA Division I men's basketball season. Florida State competes in Division I of the National Collegiate Athletic Association (NCAA). The Seminoles were led by twelfth year head coach Leonard Hamilton and played their home games at the Donald L. Tucker Center on the university's Tallahassee, Florida campus. They are members of the Atlantic Coast Conference.

Florida State finished the season 22–14, 9–9 in ACC play, to finish in a tie for seventh place. They lost in the quarterfinals of the ACC tournament to Virginia. They were invited to the National Invitation Tournament where they lost in the semifinals to Minnesota. The Seminoles achieved their eighteenth twenty-win season, the seventh under Hamilton, and advanced to the semifinals of the National Invitation Tournament for only the second time in school history.

== Previous season ==
The Seminoles finished the 2012–13 season 18–16, 9–9 in ACC play, and lost in the 1st round of the NIT to Louisiana Tech.

== Pre-season ==
Assistant coach Corey Williams left his position at Florida State to become the new head coach at Stetson. Former Georgia Southern head coach Charlton Young took over as an assistant.

=== Departures ===
Name	Number	Pos.	Height	Weight	Year	Hometown	Notes
Terrence Shannon	2	F	6'8"	240	Junior (Redshirt)	Forsyth, Georgia	Transferred
Rafael Portuondo	20	G	5'11"	165	Senior	Miami, Florida	Graduated
Michael Snaer	21	G	6'5"	202	Senior	Moreno Valley, California	Graduated

=== 2013 recruiting class ===
College recruiting information
Name	Hometown	School	Height	Weight	Commit date
Xavier Rathan-Mayes; SG	Toronto, Canada	Huntington Prep	6 ft 4 in (1.93 m)	190 lb (86 kg)	Oct 13, 2012
Xavier Rathan-Mayes; SG	Recruit ratings: Scout: Rivals: ESPN: (N/A)				
Jarquez Smith; PF	Gray, Georgia	Jones County High School	6 ft 9 in (2.06 m)	220 lb (100 kg)	Oct 14, 2012
Jarquez Smith; PF	Recruit ratings: Scout: Rivals: ESPN: (N/A)				
Overall recruit ranking: Scout: N/A Rivals: N/A ESPN: 36
Note: In many cases, Scout, Rivals, 247Sports, On3, and ESPN may conflict in their listings of height and weight.; In these cases, the average was taken. ESPN grades are on a 100-point scale.; Sources: "2013 Team Ranking". Rivals.

Prior to the start of the season, Xavier Rathan-Mayes was ruled out for the season due to being declared academically ineligible.

== Roster ==
2013–14 Florida State Seminoles men's basketball team
Players
Coaches

Pos.	#	Name	Height	Weight	Year	Previous school	Hometown
G	1	Devon Bookert	6 ft 3 in (1.91 m)	185 lb (84 kg)	So	West Anchorage HS	Anchorage, AK
F	5	Jarquez Smith	6 ft 9 in (2.06 m)	225 lb (102 kg)	Fr	Jones County High School	Haddock, Georgia
F	10	Okaro White	6 ft 9 in (2.06 m)	204 lb (93 kg)	Sr	Clearwater	Clearwater, Florida
C	11	Kiel Turpin	7 ft 0 in (2.13 m)	240 lb (109 kg)	RS Sr	Lincoln College	Normal, Illinois
C	14	Robert Gilchrist	6 ft 9 in (2.06 m)	220 lb (100 kg)	Sr	Polk State College	London, England
C	15	Boris Bojanovsky	7 ft 3 in (2.21 m)	235 lb (107 kg)	So	Oakley College	Bratislava, Slovakia
G	22	Xavier Rathan-Mayes	6 ft 4 in (1.93 m)	180 lb (82 kg)	Fr	Huntington (WV) Prep	Scarborough, Ontario
G	25	Aaron Thomas	6 ft 5 in (1.96 m)	195 lb (88 kg)	Fr	Brewster Academy	Cincinnati
G	30	Ian Miller	6 ft 3 in (1.91 m)	186 lb (84 kg)	Sr	United Faith Christian Academy	Charlotte, North Carolina
G	32	Montay Brandon	6 ft 7 in (2.01 m)	216 lb (98 kg)	So	Wesleyan Christian Acad.	Greensboro, North Carolina
F	35	Joell Hopkins	6 ft 6 in (1.98 m)	205 lb (93 kg)	Sr	Tallahassee CC	Durham, North Carolina
F	40	Brandon Allen	6 ft 6 in (1.98 m)	190 lb (86 kg)	Fr	Milton HS	Milton, Florida
C	50	Michael Ojo	7 ft 1 in (2.16 m)	292 lb (132 kg)	Fr	Tennessee Temple Acad.	Lagos, Nigeria

Head coach

- Leonard Hamilton (UT Martin)

Assistant coach(es)

- Stan Jones (Memphis)
- Dennis Gates (California)
- Charlton Young (Georgia Southern)

Legend

- (C) Team captain
- (S) Suspended
- (I) Ineligible
- (W) Walk-on
- Injured
- Current redshirt

Roster
Last update: 2013-08-25

=== Depth chart ===
Pos.	Starting 5	Bench
C	Boris Bojanovsky	Michael Ojo
PF	Okaro White	Brandon Allen
SF	Robert Gilchrist	Jarquez Smith
SG	Devon Bookert	Aaron Thomas
PG	Montay Brandon	Ian Miller

== Coaching staff ==
Florida State Seminoles coaches

Head coach

- Leonard Hamilton

Assistant coaches

- Stan jones – Associate head coach
- Dennis gates – Assistant Coach
- Charlton Young – Assistant Coach
- Michael bradley – Strength and Conditioning Coach
- Erik casto – Basketball Equipment Manager
- Kyle cregan – Video coordinator
- Jacob ridenhour – Director of Operations

== Rankings ==
Ranking movement Legend: ██ Increase in ranking. ██ Decrease in ranking. NR = Not ranked. RV = Received votes.
Poll	Pre	Wk 1	Wk 2	Wk 3	Wk 4	Wk 5	Wk 6	Wk 7	Wk 8	Wk 9	Wk 10	Wk 11	Wk 12	Wk 13	Wk 14	Wk 15	Wk 16	Wk 17	Wk 18	Wk 19	Wk 20	Final
AP	NR	NR	RV	RV	RV	NR	NR	RV	RV	NR	NR	NR	NR	NR	NR	NR	NR	NR	NR	NR	NR	N/A
Coaches	NR	NR	NR	RV	RV	NR	NR	RV	RV	NR	NR	NR	NR	NR	NR	NR	NR	NR	NR	NR	NR	RV

== Schedule ==
Seminole Madness was held on October 11 at the Leon County Civic Center.

Date time, TV	Rank^{#}	Opponent^{#}	Result	Record	High points	High rebounds	High assists	Site (attendance) city, state
Exhibition
October 30*; 7:00 p.m., WFSU		Southeastern	W 112–74	0–0	– – –	– – –	– – –	Donald L. Tucker Center; Tallahassee, FL
November 4*; 7:00 p.m., WFSU		Flagler	W 76–47	0–0	– – –	– – –	– – –	Donald L. Tucker Center; Tallahassee, FL
Non-conference regular season
November 8*; 8:00 p.m., ESPN3		Jacksonville	W 91–67	1–0	18 – White	11 – White	3 – Brandon	Donald L. Tucker Center (5,761); Tallahassee, FL
November 13*; 7:00 p.m., ESPNews		at UCF	W 80–68	2–0	17 – Bookert	19 – Brandon	5 – Bookert	CFE Arena (9,343); Orlando, FL
November 17*; 2:00 p.m., ESPN3		UT-Martin	W 89–61	3–0	17 – White	6 – Tied	5 – Bookert	Donald L. Tucker Center (6,042); Tallahassee, FL
November 21*; 7:35 p.m., ESPNU		vs. No. 10 VCU; Puerto Rico Tip-Off quarterfinals	W 85–67	4–0	22 – Miller	9 – Tied	4 – Miller	Roberto Clemente Coliseum (4,952); San Juan, Puerto Rico
November 22*; 5:00 p.m., ESPN2/ESPNU		vs. No. 14 Michigan; Puerto Rico Tip-Off semifinals	L 80–82 ^{OT}	4–1	19 – Miller	12 – White	4 – Brandon	Roberto Clemente Coliseum (5,835); San Juan, Puerto Rico
November 24*; 4:30 p.m., ESPN2		vs. Northeastern; Puerto Rico Tip-Off third-place game	W 62–60	5–1	16 – Thomas	5 – Tied	2 – Tied	Roberto Clemente Coliseum (5,835); San Juan, Puerto Rico
November 29*; 7:30 p.m., ESPN2		at No. 15 Florida; Rivalry	L 66–67	5–2	14 – Bojanovsky	7 – Brandon	5 – Miller	O'Connell Center (12,306); Gainesville, FL
December 3*; 9:30 p.m., ESPNU		at Minnesota; ACC–Big Ten Challenge	L 61–71	5–3	16 – Tied	8 – White	7 – Miller	Williams Arena (11,386); Minneapolis, MN
December 8*; 6:00 p.m., ESPN3		Jacksonville State	W 77–53	6–3	17 – White	7 – Ojo	4 – Bookert	Donald L. Tucker Center (5,104); Tallahassee, FL
December 17*; 7:00 p.m., RSN		Charlotte	W 106–62	7–3	26 – Thomas	11 – White	8 – Bokert	Donald L. Tucker Center (5,522); Tallahassee, FL
December 21*; 2:00 p.m., FSN		vs. No. 22 Massachusetts; Orange Bowl Basketball Classic	W 60–55	8–3	18 – Thomas	9 – Brandon	4 – Miller	BB&T Center (11,214); Sunrise, FL
December 30*; 7:00 p.m., RSN		Charleston Southern	W 67–59	9–3	19 – Thomas	7 – Bookert	9 – Bookert	Donald L. Tucker Center (5,159); Tallahassee, FL
ACC regular season
January 4; 5:00 p.m., ESPN2		Virginia	L 50–62	9–4 (0–1)	15 – White	7 – White	4 – Miller	Donald L. Tucker Center (5,588); Tallahassee, FL
January 9; 7:00 p.m., RSN		at Clemson	W 56–41	10–4 (1–1)	15 – Miller	7 – Gilchrist	5 – Miller	Littlejohn Coliseum (8,319); Clemson, SC
January 12; 8:00 p.m., ESPNU		Maryland	W 85–61	11–4 (2–1)	20 – Miller	8 – White	6 – Booker	Donald L. Tucker Center (7,516); Tallahassee, FL
January 15; 9:00 p.m., ACCN		at Miami (FL)	W 63–53	12–4 (3–1)	12 – Thomas	6 – Tied	4 – Miller	BankUnited Center (7,413); Coral Gables, FL
January 18; 12:00 p.m., ACCN		at Virginia	L 66–78	12–5 (3–2)	15 – Tied	7 – White	4 – Thomas	John Paul Jones Arena (12,765); Charlottesville, VA
January 21; 8:00 p.m., ACCN		Notre Dame	W 76–74	13–5 (4–2)	20 – Thomas	11 – White	4 – Thomas	Donald L. Tucker Center (7,799); Tallahassee, FL
January 25; 12:00 p.m., ESPN		at No. 18 Duke	L 56–78	13–6 (4–3)	14 – White	8 – White	3 – Thomas	Cameron Indoor Stadium (9,314); Durham, NC
January 29; 9:00 p.m., ACCN		at NC State	L 70–74	13–7 (4–4)	20 – White	7 – Tied	5 – Bookert	PNC Arena (7,005); Raleigh, NC
February 1; 3:00 p.m., ESPN2		Clemson	L 49–53	13–8 (4–5)	13 – Thomas	3 – Tied	2 – Tied	Donald L. Tucker Center (9,752); Tallahassee, FL
February 5; 9:00 p.m., RSN		Virginia Tech	W 70–50	14–8 (5–5)	24 – Thomas	8 – Tied	3 – Tied	Donald L. Tucker Center (5,759); Tallahassee, FL
February 8; 3:00 p.m., ESPN2		at Maryland	L 71–83	14–9 (5–6)	17 – Thomas	8 – Tied	3 – Tied	Comcast Center (14,783); College Park, MD
February 10; 7:00 p.m., ESPN		Miami (FL)	L 73–77	14–10 (5–7)	17 – Bookert	7 – White	5 – Bookert	Donald L. Tucker Center (7,641); Tallahassee, FL
February 15; 8:00 p.m., RSN		at Wake Forest	W 67–60	15–10 (6–7)	25 – Miller	14 – Thomas	3 – Thomas	Lawrence Joel Veterans Memorial Coliseum (10,043); Winston-Salem, NC
February 17; 7:00 p.m., ESPN		North Carolina	L 75–81	15–11 (6–8)	22 – Miller	5 – Tied	2 – Miller	Donald L. Tucker Center (7,814); Tallahassee, FL
February 23; 6:00 p.m., ESPNU		at Pittsburgh	W 71–66	16–11 (7–8)	22 – White	12 – Brandon	5 – Miller	Peterson Events Center (12,508); Pittsburgh, PA
March 2; 6:00 p.m., ESPNU		Georgia Tech	W 81–71	17–11 (8–8)	18 – White	12 – Brandon	3 – Tied	Donald L. Tucker Center (6,212); Tallahassee, FL
March 4; 9:00 p.m., ESPNU		at Boston College	W 74–70	18–11 (9–8)	26 – Thomas	6 – Thomas	3 – Miller	Conte Forum (2,273); Chestnut Hill, MA
March 9; 2:30 p.m., ACCN		No. 7 Syracuse	L 58–74	18–12 (9–9)	20 – White	11 – White	3 – Bojanovsky	Donald L. Tucker Center (10,435); Tallahassee, FL
ACC tournament
March 13; 12:00 p.m., ESPN/ACCN	(9)	vs. (8) Maryland; Second round	W 67–65	19–12	17 – Miller	7 – White	3 – Bookert	Greensboro Coliseum (21,533); Greensboro, NC
March 14; 12:00 p.m., ESPN2/ACCN	(9)	vs. (1) No. 6 Virginia; Quarterfinal	L 51–64	19–13	17 – White	3 – White	4 – Brandon	Greensboro Coliseum (21,533); Greensboro, NC
National Invitation tournament
March 18*; 7:00 p.m., ESPN2	(1)	(8) Florida Gulf Coast; Florida State Quadrant; First round	W 58–53	20–13	22 – Thomas	8 – Bookert	2 – Bookert	Donald L. Tucker Center (2,734); Tallahassee, FL
March 24*; 7:00 p.m., ESPN	(1)	(4) Georgetown; Florida State Quadrant; Second round	W 101–90	21–13	26 – Thomas	6 – Thomas	9 – Bookert	Donald L. Tucker Center (3,541); Tallahassee, FL
March 26*; 7:00 p.m., ESPN2	(1)	(3) Louisiana Tech; Florida State Quadrant; Quarterfinal	W 78–75	22–13	21 – Thomas	9 – Thomas	3 – Miller	Donald L. Tucker Center (4,470); Tallahassee, FL
April 1*; 9:00 p.m., ESPN2	(1)	vs. (1) Minnesota; Semifinal	L 64–67 ^{OT}	22–14	16 – Tied	12 – White	4 – Bookert	Madison Square Garden (7,193); New York, NY
*Non-conference game. ^{#}Rankings from AP poll. (#) Tournament seedings in parentheses. All times are in Eastern Time.

Source: 2013–14 Florida State Seminoles basketball schedule

== Media ==
Florida State basketball is broadcast on the Florida State University Seminoles Radio Network.
