= 2013–14 Duke Blue Devils men's basketball team =

American college basketball season

2013–14 Duke Blue Devils men's basketball

NCAA tournament, round of 64
- Conference: Atlantic Coast Conference

Ranking
- Coaches: No. 16
- AP: No. 8
- Record: 26–9 (13–5 ACC)
- Head coach: Mike Krzyzewski (34th season)
- Assistant coaches: Nate James; Steve Wojciechowski; Jeff Capel
- Captains: Tyler Thornton; Rodney Hood; Josh Hairston
- Home arena: Cameron Indoor Stadium

2013–14 ACC men's basketball standings
	Conf.				Overall
Team	W		L	PCT	W		L	PCT
No. 3 Virginia †	16	–	2	.889	30	–	7	.811
No. 14 Syracuse	14	–	4	.778	28	–	6	.824
No. 8 Duke	13	–	5	.722	26	–	9	.743
No. 19 North Carolina	13	–	5	.722	24	–	10	.706
Pittsburgh	11	–	7	.611	26	–	10	.722
Clemson	10	–	8	.556	23	–	13	.639
NC State	9	–	9	.500	22	–	14	.611
Maryland	9	–	9	.500	17	–	15	.531
Florida State	9	–	9	.500	22	–	14	.611
Miami (FL)	7	–	11	.389	17	–	16	.515
Wake Forest	6	–	12	.333	17	–	16	.515
Georgia Tech	6	–	12	.333	16	–	17	.485
Notre Dame	6	–	12	.333	15	–	17	.469
Boston College	4	–	14	.222	8	–	24	.250
Virginia Tech	2	–	16	.111	9	–	22	.290
† 2014 ACC tournament winner Rankings from AP poll

The 2013–14 Duke Blue Devils men's basketball team represented Duke University during the 2013–14 NCAA Division I men's basketball season. They were led by thirty-fourth year and Hall of Fame head coach Mike Krzyzewski. They played their home games at Cameron Indoor Stadium in Durham, North Carolina as members of the Atlantic Coast Conference. They finished the season 26–9, 13–5 in ACC play to finish in a tie for third place. They advanced to the championship game of the ACC tournament, where they lost to Virginia. They received an at-large bid to the NCAA tournament, where they lost in the first round to Mercer.

== Previous season ==
In November, the Blue Devils won the Battle 4 Atlantis tournament in the Bahamas, defeating Louisville in the championship game. They posted four victories against top 5 opponents (at the time of the game) and were undefeated (16-0) at home. Completing the season with 30 wins (and 6 losses; 14–4 in ACC play), Duke finished in second place in the ACC regular season standings. Duke was ranked in the top 10 of the AP poll all season long, including five weeks at #1. They lost in the quarterfinals of the ACC tournament to Maryland, and subsequently received a two seed in the 2013 NCAA tournament. They defeated Albany in the Round of 64, #22 Creighton in the Round of 32, and #9 Michigan State in the Sweet Sixteen to reach the Elite Eight. Duke lost to #1 overall seed and eventual NCAA champion Louisville in the Elite Eight in Indianapolis, who reversed the game result from the meeting earlier in the season.

== Off season ==
=== Departures ===
Name	Number	Pos.	Height	Weight	Year	Hometown	Reason for departure
Ryan Kelly	34	F	6'11"	230	Senior	Raleigh, North Carolina	Graduation; 2013 NBA draft
Mason Plumlee	5	F	6'10"	235	Senior	Warsaw, Indiana	Graduation; 2013 NBA draft
Seth Curry	30	G	6'2"	180	Senior	Charlotte, North Carolina	Graduation; 2013 NBA draft
Alex Murphy	12	F	6'8"	215	Sophomore (redshirt)	South Kingstown, Rhode Island	Transferred to University of Florida
Chris Collins	-	Associate head coach				Northbrook, Illinois	Hired as head coach of Northwestern basketball team

=== Class of 2013 signees ===
Duke recruits at the 2013 McDonald's All-American Boys Game

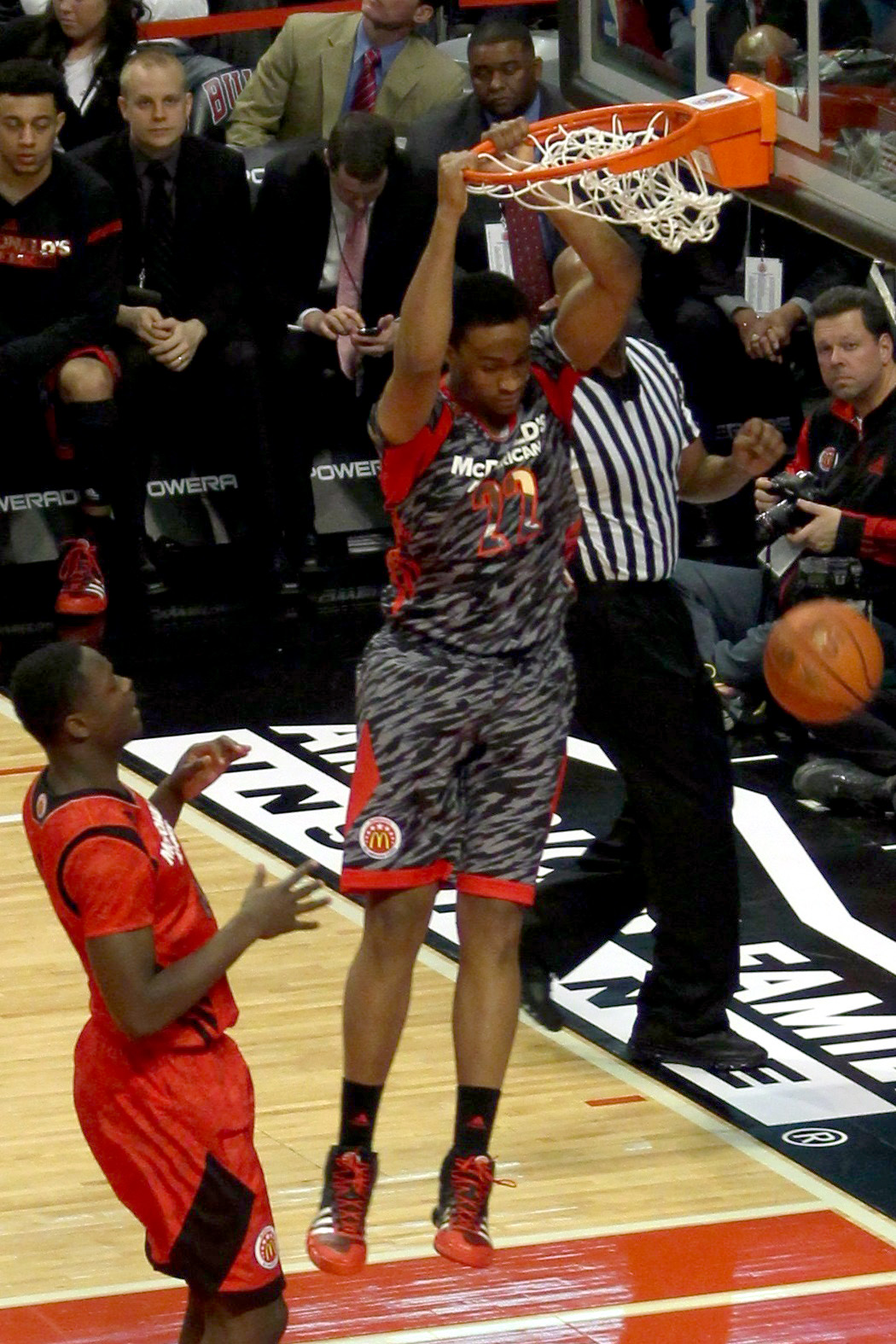
Jabari Parker

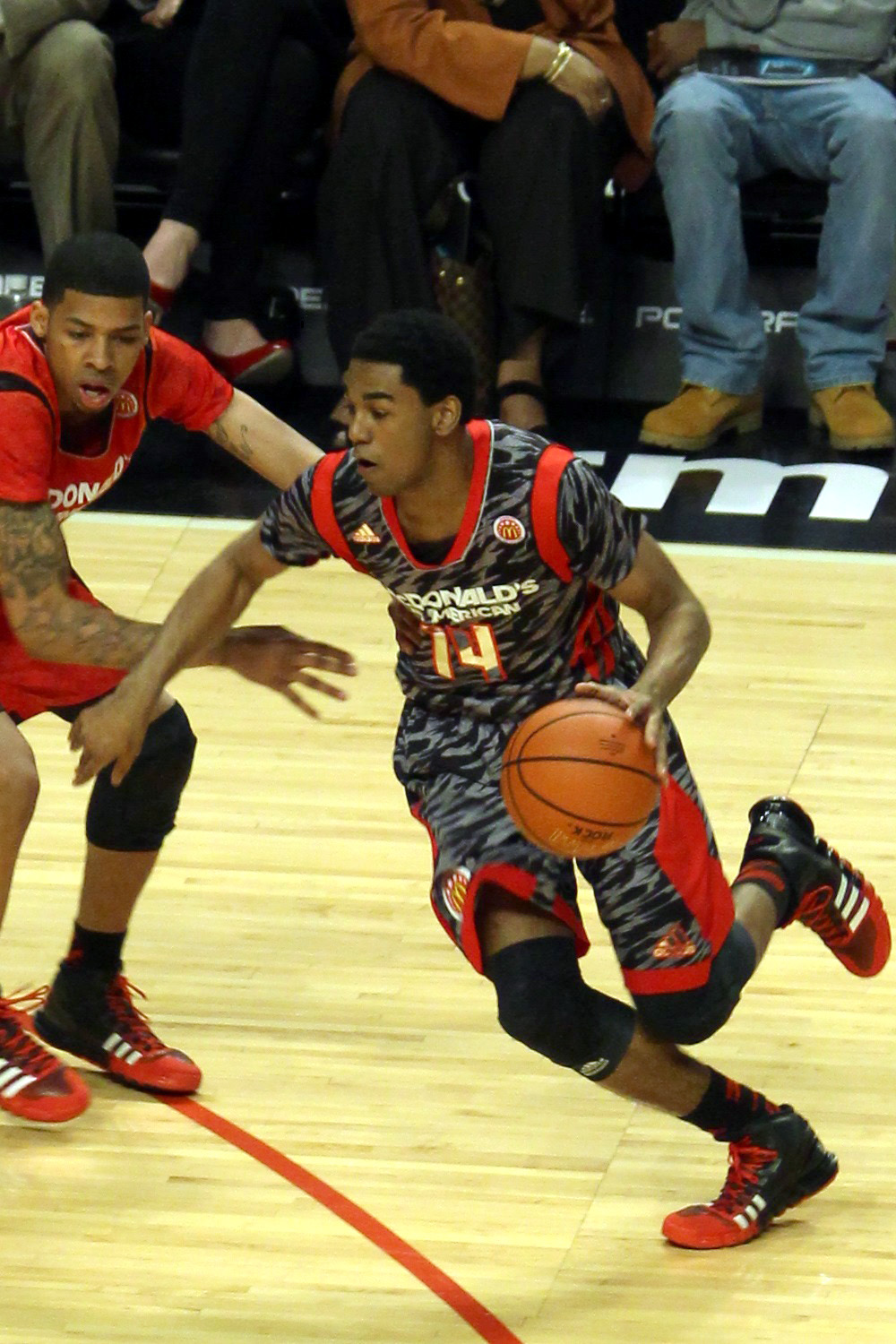
Matt Jones

College recruiting
Name	Hometown	School	Height	Weight	Commit date
Jabari Parker; SF	Chicago, IL	Simeon Career Academy	6 ft 8 in (2.03 m)	220 lb (100 kg)	Dec 20, 2012
Jabari Parker; SF	Recruit ratings: Scout: Rivals: 247Sports: ESPN:				
Matt Jones; SG	DeSoto, TX	DeSoto	6 ft 4 in (1.93 m)	180 lb (82 kg)	Nov 28, 2011
Matt Jones; SG	Recruit ratings: Scout: Rivals: 247Sports: ESPN:				
Semi Ojeleye; SF	Ottawa, KS	Ottawa	6 ft 6 in (1.98 m)	220 lb (100 kg)	Sep 9, 2012
Semi Ojeleye; SF	Recruit ratings: Scout: Rivals: 247Sports: ESPN:				
Overall recruit ranking:
Note: In many cases, Scout, Rivals, 247Sports, On3, and ESPN may conflict in their listings of height and weight.; In these cases, the average was taken. ESPN grades are on a 100-point scale.; Sources: "Duke Basketball Commitment List". Rivals.; "2013 Duke Basketball Commits". Scout.; "ESPN". ESPN.; "Scout.com Team Recruiting Rankings". Scout.; "2013 Team Ranking". Rivals.

== Roster ==
2013–14 Duke Blue Devils men's basketball team
Players
Coaches

Pos.	#	Name	Height	Weight	Year	Previous school	Hometown
F	1	Jabari Parker	6 ft 8 in (2.03 m)	235 lb (107 kg)	Fr	Simeon Career Academy	Chicago, Illinois
PG	2	Quinn Cook	6 ft 2 in (1.88 m)	180 lb (82 kg)	Jr	Oak Hill Academy	Bowie, Maryland
PG	3	Tyler Thornton (C)	6 ft 2 in (1.88 m)	190 lb (86 kg)	Sr	Gonzaga College HS	Washington, D.C.
SF	5	Rodney Hood (C)	6 ft 8 in (2.03 m)	215 lb (98 kg)	RS So	Meridian	Meridian, Mississippi
SG	13	Matt Jones	6 ft 4 in (1.93 m)	200 lb (91 kg)	Fr	DeSoto HS	DeSoto, Texas
SG	14	Rasheed Sulaimon	6 ft 4 in (1.93 m)	190 lb (86 kg)	So	Strake Jesuit College Prep	Houston, Texas
PF	15	Josh Hairston (C)	6 ft 8 in (2.03 m)	235 lb (107 kg)	Sr	Montrose Christian	Fredericksburg, Virginia
SF	20	Semi Ojeleye	6 ft 7 in (2.01 m)	230 lb (104 kg)	Fr	Ottawa Senior HS	Ottawa, Kansas
PF	21	Amile Jefferson	6 ft 9 in (2.06 m)	210 lb (95 kg)	So	Friends Central School	Philadelphia, Pennsylvania
SG	34	Andre Dawkins	6 ft 5 in (1.96 m)	215 lb (98 kg)	RS Sr	Atlantic Shores Christian	Chesapeake, Virginia
C	40	Marshall Plumlee	7 ft 0 in (2.13 m)	260 lb (118 kg)	RS So	Christ School	Warsaw, Indiana
G	45	Nick Pagliuca (W)	6 ft 3 in (1.91 m)	175 lb (79 kg)	Fr	Milton Academy	Weston, Massachusetts
C	52	Todd Zafirovski	6 ft 9 in (2.06 m)	245 lb (111 kg)	RS Sr	Lake Forest Academy	Lake Forest, Illinois

Head coach

- Mike Krzyzewski

Assistant coach(es)

- Nate James
- Steve Wojciechowski
- Jeff Capel

Legend

- (C) Team captain
- (S) Suspended
- (I) Ineligible
- (W) Walk-on
- Injured
- Current redshirt

Roster
Last update: 08/25/13

=== Depth chart ===
Pos.	Starting 5	Bench 1	Bench 2
C	Amile Jefferson	Marshall Plumlee	Todd Zalfirovski
PF	Jabari Parker	Josh Hairston	Alex Murphy
SF	Rodney Hood	Matt Jones	Semi Ojeleye
SG	Tyler Thornton	Rasheed Sulaimon	Andre Dawkins
PG	Quinn Cook		Nick Pagliuca

== Schedule ==
In Duke's 2013–14 ACC season opening 79–77 loss against Notre Dame, Krzyzewski endured his first loss to one of his former assistant coaches after 18 wins. With the loss, Duke fell from the top 10 in the AP Poll for the first time in 122 weeks of the poll (since November 26, 2007). On January 25, Duke defeated Florida State to achieve Krzyzewski's 900th win at Duke. The Blue Devils were upset by Mercer, 78–71 in the NCAA tournament's first round, to conclude their season.

Date time, TV	Rank^{#}	Opponent^{#}	Result	Record	High points	High rebounds	High assists	Site (attendance) city, state
Exhibition
October 26, 2013*; 1:00 pm	No. 4	Bowie State	W 103–67		19 – Hood	8 – Hood	5 – Parker	Cameron Indoor Stadium (9,314); Durham, NC
November 2, 2013*; 1:00 pm	No. 4	Drury	W 81–65		21 – Hood	16 – Jefferson	4 – 2 tied	Cameron Indoor Stadium (9,314); Durham, NC
Non-conference regular season
November 8, 2013*; 7:00 pm, ESPNU	No. 4	Davidson	W 111–77	1–0	22 – 2 tied	9 – Hood	8 – Cook	Cameron Indoor Stadium (9,314); Durham, NC
November 12, 2013*; 10:00 pm, ESPN	No. 4	vs. No. 5 Kansas; Champions Classic	L 83–94	1–1	27 – Parker	9 – Parker	5 – Hood	United Center (22,711); Chicago, IL
November 15, 2013*; 7:00 pm, ESPN3	No. 4	Florida Atlantic	W 97–64	2–1	28 – Hood	10 – Parker	8 – Cook	Cameron Indoor Stadium (9,314); Durham, NC
November 18, 2013*; 7:00 pm, ESPNU	No. 6 (2)	UNC Asheville; NIT Season Tip-Off First Round	W 91–55	3–1	21 – Parker	10 – Parker	5 – Cook	Cameron Indoor Stadium (9,314); Durham, NC
November 19, 2013*; 6:00 pm, ESPNU	No. 6 (2)	(7) East Carolina; NIT Season Tip-Off Quarterfinals	W 83–74	4–1	30 – Hood	9 – Parker	10 – Cook	Cameron Indoor Stadium (9,314); Durham, NC
November 24, 2013*; 6:30 pm, ESPNU	No. 6	Vermont	W 91–90	5–1	26 – Parker	9 – Parker	8 – Cook	Cameron Indoor Stadium (9,314); Durham, NC
November 27, 2013*; 9:30 pm, ESPN	No. 6 (2)	vs. (3) Alabama; NIT Season Tip-Off Semifinals	W 74–64	6–1	27 – Parker	8 – Parker	5 – Sulaimon	Madison Square Garden (8,741); New York, NY
November 29, 2013*; 6:00 pm, ESPN	No. 6 (2)	vs. No. 4 (1) Arizona; NIT Season Tip-Off Championship	L 66–72	6–2	21 – Hood	8 – Hood	3 – 2 tied	Madison Square Garden (13,266); New York, NY
December 3, 2013*; 9:15 pm, ESPN	No. 10	No. 22 Michigan; ACC–Big Ten Challenge/Rivalry	W 79–69	7–2	24 – Cook	6 – 2 tied	9 – Cook	Cameron Indoor Stadium (9,314); Durham, NC
December 16, 2013*; 7:00 pm, ESPNU	No. 8	Gardner–Webb	W 85–66	8–2	21 – Parker	10 – Jefferson	9 – Cook	Cameron Indoor Stadium (9,314); Durham, NC
December 19, 2013*; 7:30 pm, ESPN	No. 8	vs. UCLA; CARQUEST Auto Parts Classic	W 80–63	9–2	23 – Parker	10 – Parker	5 – 2 tied	Madison Square Garden (15,410); New York, NY
December 28, 2013*; 2:00 pm, ESPN2	No. 9	Eastern Michigan	W 82–59	10–2	23 – Parker	14 – Jefferson	7 – Cook	Cameron Indoor Stadium (9,314); Durham, NC
December 31, 2013*; 1:00 pm, ESPNU	No. 7	vs. Elon	W 86–48	11–2	15 – Dawkins	10 – Parker	4 – Cook	Greensboro Coliseum (9,717); Greensboro, NC
ACC regular season
January 4, 2014; 4:00 pm, CBS	No. 7	at Notre Dame	L 77–79	11–3 (0–1)	27 – Hood	9 – Jefferson	4 – Cook	Edmund P. Joyce Center (9,149); South Bend, IN
January 7, 2014; 7:00 pm, ESPNU	No. 16	Georgia Tech	W 79–57	12–3 (1–1)	27 – Hood	10 – Jefferson	5 – Cook	Cameron Indoor Stadium (9,314); Durham, NC
January 11, 2014; 2:00 pm, RSN	No. 16	at Clemson	L 59–72	12–4 (1–2)	20 – Hood	7 – Parker	7 – Cook	Littlejohn Coliseum (9,842); Clemson, SC
January 13, 2014; 7:00 pm, ESPN	No. 23	Virginia; Big Monday	W 69–65	13–4 (2–2)	21 – Sulaimon	15 – Jefferson	2 – 4 tied	Cameron Indoor Stadium (9,314); Durham, NC
January 18, 2014; 2:00 pm, CBS	No. 23	NC State	W 95–60	14–4 (3–2)	23 – Parker	8 – Jefferson	6 – Sulaimon	Cameron Indoor Stadium (9,314); Durham, NC
January 22, 2014; 7:30 pm, ESPN2	No. 18	at Miami (FL)	W 67–46	15–4 (4–2)	17 – Parker	15 – Parker	4 – 2 tied	BankUnited Center (7,972); Coral Gables, FL
January 25, 2014; 12:00 pm, ESPN	No. 18	Florida State	W 78–56	16–4 (5–2)	18 – Hood	14 – Parker	2 – 4 tied	Cameron Indoor Stadium (9,314); Durham, NC
January 27, 2014; 7:00 pm, ESPN	No. 17	at No. 18 Pittsburgh; Big Monday	W 80–65	17–4 (6–2)	21 – Parker	11 – Parker	6 – Cook	Petersen Events Center (12,944); Pittsburgh, PA
February 1, 2014; 6:30 pm, ESPN	No. 17	at No. 2 Syracuse; College GameDay	L 89–91 ^{OT}	17–5 (6–3)	16 – Sulaimon	9 – Parker	6 – Sulaimon	Carrier Dome (35,446); Syracuse, NY
February 4, 2014; 9:00 pm, ESPNU	No. 11	Wake Forest	W 83–63	18–5 (7–3)	21 – Parker	8 – Parker	5 – 2 tied	Cameron Indoor Stadium (9,314); Durham, NC
February 8, 2014; 6:00 pm, ESPN	No. 11	at Boston College	W 89–68	19–5 (8–3)	29 – Parker	16 – Parker	6 – 2 tied	Conte Forum (8,606); Chestnut Hill, MA
February 15, 2014; 6:00 pm, ESPN2	No. 8	Maryland; Duke–Maryland basketball rivalry	W 69–67	20–5 (9–3)	23 – Parker	12 – Jefferson	3 – Thornton	Cameron Indoor Stadium (9,314); Durham, NC
February 18, 2014; 9:00 pm, ACCN	No. 5	at Georgia Tech	W 68–51	21–5 (10–3)	16 – Parker	14 – Parker	5 – Thornton	Hank McCamish Pavilion (8,600); Atlanta, GA
February 20, 2014; 9:00 pm, ESPN/ACCN	No. 5	at North Carolina; Carolina–Duke rivalry	L 66–74	21–6 (10–4)	17 – 2 tied	11 – Parker	3 – Cook	Dean Smith Center (21,750); Chapel Hill, NC
February 22, 2014; 7:00 pm, ESPN	No. 5	No. 1 Syracuse	W 66–60	22–6 (11–4)	19 – Parker	10 – Parker	7 – Sulaimon	Cameron Indoor Stadium (9,314); Durham, NC
February 25, 2014; 7:00 pm, ESPNU	No. 6	Virginia Tech	W 66–48	23–6 (12–4)	21 – Hood	12 – Parker	7 – Thornton	Cameron Indoor Stadium (9,314); Durham, NC
March 5, 2014; 7:00 pm, ESPN2	No. 4	at Wake Forest	L 72–82	23–7 (12–5)	19 – Parker	10 – Parker	4 – 2 tied	LJVM Coliseum (12,036); Winston-Salem, NC
March 8, 2014; 9:00 pm, ESPN	No. 4	No. 14 North Carolina; College GameDay/Rivalry	W 93–81	24–7 (13–5)	30 – Parker	11 – Parker	6 – Cook	Cameron Indoor Stadium (9,314); Durham, NC
ACC Tournament
March 14, 2014; 9:40 pm, ESPN/ACCN	No. 7 (3)	vs. (6) Clemson; Quarterfinals	W 63–62	25–7	18 – Parker	13 – Jefferson	3 – Thornton	Greensboro Coliseum (21,533); Greensboro, NC
March 15, 2014; 3:33 pm, ESPN/ACCN	No. 7 (3)	vs. (7) NC State; Semifinals	W 75–67	26–7	20 – Parker	8 – Parker	3 – 2 tied	Greensboro Coliseum (21,533); Greensboro, NC
March 16, 2014; 1:00 pm, ESPN/ACCN	No. 7 (3)	vs. No. 6 (1) Virginia; Championship	L 63–72	26–8	23 – Parker	8 – Parker	6 – Cook	Greensboro Coliseum (21,533); Greensboro, NC
NCAA tournament
March 21, 2014; 12:15 pm, CBS	No. 8 (3 MW)	vs. (14 MW) Mercer; Second round	L 71–78	26–9	23 – Cook	11 – Jefferson	5 – Hood	PNC Arena (16,988); Raleigh, NC
*Non-conference game. ^{#}Rankings from AP Poll, (#) is seed within tournament MW=Midwest. (#) Tournament seedings in parentheses. All times are in Eastern Time.

== Rankings ==
Ranking movements Legend: ██ Increase in ranking ██ Decrease in ranking т = Tied with team above or below
	Week																				
Poll	Pre	2	3	4	5	6	7	8	9	10	11	12	13	14	15	16	17	18	19	20	Final
AP	4	4	6	6	10	8	8	9	7	16	23	18	17	11	8	5	6	4	7	8	N/A*
Coaches	4	4	6	5	8	7	8	9	8	13т	20	18	16	11	9	6	7	4	6	6	16

*AP does not release post-NCAA tournament rankings.
