= 2013–14 Pittsburgh Panthers men's basketball team =

American college basketball season

2013–14 Pittsburgh Panthers men's basketball

Legends Classic Champions

NCAA tournament, round of 32
- Conference: Atlantic Coast Conference
- Record: 26–10 (11–7 ACC)
- Head coach: Jamie Dixon (11th season)
- Assistant coaches: Barry Rohrssen (6th season); Brandin Knight (6th season); Bill Barton (3rd season)
- Home arena: Petersen Events Center (Capacity: 12,508)

2013–14 ACC men's basketball standings
	Conf.				Overall
Team	W		L	PCT	W		L	PCT
No. 3 Virginia †	16	–	2	.889	30	–	7	.811
No. 14 Syracuse	14	–	4	.778	28	–	6	.824
No. 8 Duke	13	–	5	.722	26	–	9	.743
No. 19 North Carolina	13	–	5	.722	24	–	10	.706
Pittsburgh	11	–	7	.611	26	–	10	.722
Clemson	10	–	8	.556	23	–	13	.639
NC State	9	–	9	.500	22	–	14	.611
Maryland	9	–	9	.500	17	–	15	.531
Florida State	9	–	9	.500	22	–	14	.611
Miami (FL)	7	–	11	.389	17	–	16	.515
Wake Forest	6	–	12	.333	17	–	16	.515
Georgia Tech	6	–	12	.333	16	–	17	.485
Notre Dame	6	–	12	.333	15	–	17	.469
Boston College	4	–	14	.222	8	–	24	.250
Virginia Tech	2	–	16	.111	9	–	22	.290
† 2014 ACC tournament winner Rankings from AP poll

The 2013–14 Pittsburgh Panthers men's basketball team represented the University of Pittsburgh during the 2013–14 NCAA Division I men's basketball season. The team played its home games at the Petersen Events Center in Pittsburgh, Pennsylvania. This was Pittsburgh's inaugural season in the Atlantic Coast Conference, having moved from the Big East Conference. Pitt had been in the Big East since 1982. They finished the season 26–10, 11–7 in ACC play to finish in fifth place. They advanced to the semifinals of the ACC tournament where they lost to Virginia. They received an at-large bid to the NCAA tournament where they defeated Colorado in the second round before losing in the third round to Florida.

== Roster ==
2013–14 Pittsburgh Panthers men's basketball team
Players
Coaches

Pos.	#	Name	Height	Weight	Year	Previous school	Hometown
G	0	James Robinson	6 ft 3 in (1.91 m)	200 lb (91 kg)	So	DeMatha Catholic	Mitchellville, Maryland
F	1	Jamel Artis	6 ft 7 in (2.01 m)	230 lb (104 kg)	Fr	Notre Dame Prep (Fitchburg, Massachusetts)	Baltimore
F	2	Michael Young	6 ft 8 in (2.03 m)	245 lb (111 kg)	Fr	St. Benedict's (Newark, New Jersey)	Duquesne, Pennsylvania
G	3	Cameron Wright (redshirt)	6 ft 4 in (1.93 m)	205 lb (93 kg)	Jr	Benedictine	Cleveland
F	5	Durand Johnson (redshirt)	6 ft 6 in (1.98 m)	195 lb (88 kg)	So	Brewster Academy (Wolfeboro, New Hampshire)	Baltimore
F	11	Derrick Randall	6 ft 8 in (2.03 m)	240 lb (109 kg)	Jr	South Kent (South Kent, Connecticut)	Brooklyn
G/F	12	Chris Jones (redshirt)	6 ft 6 in (1.98 m)	210 lb (95 kg)	Fr	Teaneck	Teaneck, New Jersey
G	13	Josh Newkirk	6 ft 1 in (1.85 m)	175 lb (79 kg)	Fr	Word of God	Raleigh, North Carolina
F	15	Aron Nwankwo (redshirt)	6 ft 7.5 in (2.02 m)	215 lb (98 kg)	Jr	Baltimore City College	Baltimore
G/F	21	Lamar Patterson (redshirt)	6 ft 5 in (1.96 m)	225 lb (102 kg)	Sr	St. Benedict's (Newark, New Jersey)	Lancaster, Pennsylvania
G	22	Joshua Ko	6 ft 1 in (1.85 m)	150 lb (68 kg)	Fr	Kalaheo	Kailua, HI
G	24	Mike Lecak (redshirt)	6 ft 2 in (1.88 m)	175 lb (79 kg)	So	North Canyon (Phoenix, Arizona); Wheeling Jesuit	Pittsburgh
F	42	Talib Zanna (redshirt)	6 ft 9 in (2.06 m)	230 lb (104 kg)	Sr	Bishop McNamara (Forestville, Maryland)	Kaduna, Nigeria
C	50	Joseph Uchebo	6 ft 10 in (2.08 m)	260 lb (118 kg)	So	Word of God (Raleigh, North Carolina); Chipola College	Enugu, Nigeria

Head coach

- Jamie Dixon (TCU)

Assistant coach(es)

- Barry Rohrssen (St. Francis College)
- Brandin Knight (Pittsburgh)
- Bill Barton (Salem State)

Legend

- (C) Team captain
- (S) Suspended
- (I) Ineligible
- (W) Walk-on
- Injured
- Current redshirt

Roster

== Schedule ==
Pitt released its 2013–14 conference opponents on April 23, 2013. They will have home games against Clemson, Duke, Florida State, Maryland, North Carolina State, Virginia, Virginia Tech, Wake Forest and Syracuse. Away games will consist of Clemson, Boston College, Maryland, Miami, Georgia Tech, North Carolina, North Carolina State, Notre Dame and Syracuse.

On May 21 it was announced that the Panthers will participate as one of the four hosts in the 2013 Legends Classic alongside Houston, Stanford, and Texas Tech. Pittsburgh will host a pair of regional round games, and will then travel to Brooklyn to participate in the championship round with the other three hosts on November 25–26 at the Barclays Center.

Date time, TV	Rank^{#}	Opponent^{#}	Result	Record	Site (attendance) city, state
Scrimmage
Sun. Oct. 6*; 3:00 p.m.		Blue-Gold Scrimmage; Maggie Dixon Heart Health Fair/Fan Fest			Petersen Events Center (6,000); Pittsburgh
Fri. Oct. 18*; 7:00 p.m., Pitt Panthers TV		Blue-Gold Scrimmage; Oakland Zoo Blue-Gold Scrimmage			Petersen Events Center (2,312); Pittsburgh
Exhibition
Fri. Oct. 25*; 7:00 p.m., ESPN3		UC San Diego	W 72–59		Petersen Events Center (5,813); Pittsburgh
Fri. Nov. 1*; 7:00 p.m., ESPN3		Slippery Rock	W 96–60		Petersen Events Center (8,530); Pittsburgh
Regular season
Fri. Nov. 8*; 7:00 p.m., ESPN3		Savannah State	W 88–55	1–0	Petersen Events Center (9,235); Pittsburgh
Tue. Nov. 12*; 7:00 p.m., ACCRSN		Fresno State	W 75–54	2–0	Petersen Events Center (8,543); Pittsburgh
Sun. Nov. 17*; 5:00 p.m., ESPN3		Howard; Legends Classic – Pittsburgh Regional Game 1	W 84–52	3–0	Petersen Events Center (8,349); Pittsburgh
Wed. Nov. 20*; 7:30 p.m., ESPNU		Lehigh; Legends Classic – Pittsburgh Regional Game 2	W 77–58	4–0	Petersen Events Center (9,544); Pittsburgh
Mon. Nov. 25*; 7:30 p.m., ESPN2		vs. Texas Tech; Legends Classic – Semifinals	W 76–53	5–0	Barclays Center (6,231); Brooklyn, New York
Tue. Nov. 26*; 9:30 p.m., ESPNU		vs. Stanford; Legends Classic – Championship Game	W 88–67	6–0	Barclays Center (4,029); Brooklyn, New York
Sat. Nov. 30*; 1:00 p.m., CBSSN		vs. Duquesne; The City Game	W 84–67	7–0	Consol Energy Center (11,146); Pittsburgh
Tue. Dec. 3*; 7:30 p.m., ESPNU		Penn State; ACC–Big Ten Challenge	W 78–69	8–0	Petersen Events Center (12,510); Pittsburgh
Fri. Dec. 6*; 7:00 p.m., ESPN3		Loyola Marymount	W 85–68	9–0	Petersen Events Center (8,049); Pittsburgh
Sat. Dec. 14*; 12:00 p.m., ACCRSN		Youngstown State	W 91–73	10–0	Petersen Events Center (8,621); Pittsburgh
Tue. Dec. 17*; 7:00 p.m., ESPN		vs. Cincinnati; Jimmy V Classic	L 43–44	10–1	Madison Square Garden (8,062); New York City
Sat. Dec. 21*; 4:00 p.m., ESPN3		Cal Poly	W 73–56	11–1	Petersen Events Center (9,736); Pittsburgh
Tue. Dec. 31*; 1:00 p.m., ESPN3		Albany	W 58–46	12–1	Petersen Events Center (10,049); Pittsburgh
Sat. Jan. 4; 12:00 p.m., ACCN		at NC State	W 74–62	13–1 (1–0)	PNC Arena (14,049); Raleigh, North Carolina
Mon. Jan. 6; 7:00 p.m., ESPNU		Maryland	W 79–59	14–1 (2–0)	Petersen Events Center (12,508); Pittsburgh
Sat. Jan. 11; 12:00 p.m., ACCN		Wake Forest	W 80–65	15–1 (3–0)	Petersen Events Center (12,515); Pittsburgh
Tue. Jan. 14; 9:00 p.m., ESPNU	No. 22	at Georgia Tech	W 81–74	16–1 (4–0)	McCamish Pavilion (7,131); Atlanta
Sat. Jan. 18; 4:00 p.m., ESPN	No. 22	at No. 2 Syracuse	L 54–59	16–2 (4–1)	Carrier Dome (30,046); Syracuse, New York
Tue. Jan. 21; 8:00 p.m., ACCN	No. 20	Clemson	W 76–43	17–2 (5–1)	Petersen Events Center (12,508); Pittsburgh
Sat. Jan. 25; 6:00 p.m., ESPN2	No. 20	at Maryland	W 83–79	18–2 (6–1)	Comcast Center (17,202); College Park, Maryland
Mon. Jan. 27; 7:00 p.m., ESPN	No. 18	No. 17 Duke	L 65–80	18–3 (6–2)	Petersen Events Center (12,944); Pittsburgh
Sun. Feb. 2; 12:30 p.m., ESPNU	No. 18	Virginia	L 45–48	18–4 (6–3)	Petersen Events Center (12,508); Pittsburgh
Wed. Feb. 5; 7:00 p.m., ACCRSN	No. 25	at Miami (FL)	W 59–55 ^{OT}	19–4 (7–3)	BankUnited Center (N/A); Coral Gables, Florida
Sat. Feb. 8; 12:00 p.m., ACCRSN	No. 25	Virginia Tech	W 62–57 ^{2OT}	20–4 (8–3)	Petersen Events Center (12,508); Pittsburgh
Wed. Feb. 12; 7:00 p.m., ESPN	No. 25	No. 1 Syracuse	L 56–58	20–5 (8–4)	Petersen Events Center (12,935); Pittsburgh
Sat. Feb. 15; 1:00 p.m., CBS	No. 25	at North Carolina	L 71–75	20–6 (8–5)	Dean E. Smith Center (20,341); Chapel Hill, North Carolina
Sun. Feb. 23; 6:00 p.m., ESPNU		Florida State	L 66–71	20–7 (8–6)	Petersen Events Center (12,508); Pittsburgh
Wed. Feb. 26; 8:00 p.m., ACCN		at Boston College	W 66–59	21–7 (9–6)	Conte Forum (3,329); Chestnut Hill, Massachusetts
Sat. Mar. 1; 2:00 p.m., ESPN2		at Notre Dame	W 85–81 ^{OT}	22–7 (10–6)	Edmund P. Joyce Center (9,149); Notre Dame, Indiana
Mon. Mar. 3; 9:00 p.m., ESPNU		NC State	L 67–74	22–8 (10–7)	Petersen Events Center (12,508); Pittsburgh
Sat. Mar. 8; 4:00 p.m., ACCN		at Clemson	W 83–78 ^{OT}	23–8 (11–7)	Littlejohn Coliseum (10,000); Clemson, South Carolina
ACC Tournament
Thu. Mar. 13; 2:00 p.m., ESPN/ACCN	No. (5)	vs. No. (12) Wake Forest; Second round	W 84–55	24–8	Greensboro Coliseum (21,533); Greensboro, North Carolina
Fri. Mar. 14; 2:00 p.m., ESPN2/ACCN	No. (5)	vs. No. 15 (4) North Carolina; Quarterfinals	W 80–75	25–8	Greensboro Coliseum (21,533); Greensboro, North Carolina
Sat. Mar. 15; 1:00 p.m., ESPN/ACCN	No. (5)	vs. No. 6 (1) Virginia; Semifinals	L 48–51	25–9	Greensboro Coliseum (21,533); Greensboro, North Carolina
NCAA tournament
Thu. Mar. 20*; 1:40 p.m., TBS	No. (9 S)	vs. No. (8 S) Colorado; Second round	W 77–48	26–9	Amway Center (16,074); Orlando, Florida
Sat. Mar. 22*; 12:15 p.m., CBS	No. (9 S)	vs. No. 1 (1 S) Florida; Third round	L 45–61	26–10	Amway Center (18,512); Orlando, Florida
*Non-conference game. ^{#}Rankings from AP Poll. (#) Tournament seedings in parentheses. All times are in Eastern Time. (#) denotes seed within region S=South.

== Rankings ==
Ranking movement Legend: ██ Improvement in ranking. ██ Decrease in ranking. ██ Not ranked the previous week. RV=Others receiving votes.
Poll	Pre	Wk 1	Wk 2	Wk 3	Wk 4	Wk 5	Wk 6	Wk 7	Wk 8	Wk 9	Wk 10	Wk 11	Wk 12	Wk 13	Wk 14	Wk 15	Wk 16	Wk 17	Wk 18	Wk 19	Wk 20	Final
AP	RV	RV	RV	RV	RV	RV	RV	RV	RV	RV	RV	22	20	18	25	25	RV	NR	RV	NR	NR	N/A
Coaches	RV	RV	RV	RV	RV	RV	RV	RV	RV	RV	RV	21	19	17	22	23	RV	RV	RV	RV	RV	RV
