= V. J. Beachem =

American basketball player (born 1995)

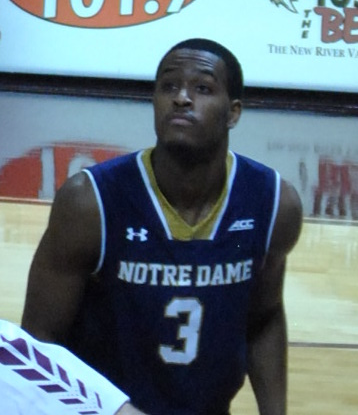

Personal information
- Born: January 15, 1995 (age 31) Fort Wayne, Indiana, U.S.
- Listed height: 6 ft 8 in (2.03 m)
- Listed weight: 186 lb (84 kg)

Career information
- High school: New Haven (New Haven, Indiana)
- College: Notre Dame (2013–2017)
- NBA draft: 2017: undrafted
- Playing career: 2017–2020
- Position: Forward

Career history
- 2017–2018: South Bay Lakers
- 2018: Wisconsin Herd
- 2018–2020: Windy City Bulls
- Stats at Basketball Reference

Victor Eric "V. J." Beachem Jr. (born January 15, 1995) is an American former professional basketball. He played college basketball for the Notre Dame Fighting Irish.

== College career ==
Beachem was a standout basketball player at New Haven, being selected as an Indiana All-Star and helped the Bulldogs to a 2013 sectional title. He signed with Notre Dame, where he posted averages of 5.9 points and 1.4 rebounds per game as a sophomore. Beachem averaged 12 points and 3.9 rebounds per game as a junior and shot 44.4 percent from three-point range. He led the team to the Sweet 16 for the second consecutive season and was named to the All-East Regional team. Following the conclusion of his junior season Beachem declared for the NBA Draft along with teammate Demetrius Jackson, however he pulled his name out before the deadline. Beachem's best season was as a senior, as he averaged 14.5 points and 4.1 rebounds per game and played solid wing defense. However Beachem had a poor showing in Notre Dame's two NCAA Tournament games, going 3-for-23 from the field and 1-for-12 from 3-point range.

== Professional career ==
After going undrafted in the 2017 NBA draft, Beachem was picked up by the Minnesota Timberwolves in the Summer League. On August 11, 2017, Beachem signed with the Los Angeles Lakers, but was waived by the Lakers on October 9, 2017. He subsequently signed with the South Bay Lakers and averaged 8.9 points per game.

Beachem was added to the opening night roster of the Wisconsin Herd on November 1, 2018. He was added to the opening night roster of the Windy City Bulls on November 7, 2019.
