= 2013–14 Miami Hurricanes men's basketball team =

American college basketball season

2013–14 Miami Hurricanes men's basketball
- Conference: Atlantic Coast Conference
- Record: 17–16 (7–11 ACC)
- Head coach: Jim Larrañaga (3rd season)
- Assistant coaches: Eric Konkol; Michael Huger; Chris Caputo
- Home arena: BankUnited Center

2013–14 ACC men's basketball standings
| | Conf. | | | | Overall |
| Team | W | | L | PCT | W | | L | PCT |
|---|---|---|---|---|---|---|---|---|
| No. 3 Virginia † | 16 | – | 2 | .889 | 30 | – | 7 | .811 |
| No. 14 Syracuse | 14 | – | 4 | .778 | 28 | – | 6 | .824 |
| No. 8 Duke | 13 | – | 5 | .722 | 26 | – | 9 | .743 |
| No. 19 North Carolina | 13 | – | 5 | .722 | 24 | – | 10 | .706 |
| Pittsburgh | 11 | – | 7 | .611 | 26 | – | 10 | .722 |
| Clemson | 10 | – | 8 | .556 | 23 | – | 13 | .639 |
| NC State | 9 | – | 9 | .500 | 22 | – | 14 | .611 |
| Maryland | 9 | – | 9 | .500 | 17 | – | 15 | .531 |
| Florida State | 9 | – | 9 | .500 | 22 | – | 14 | .611 |
| Miami (FL) | 7 | – | 11 | .389 | 17 | – | 16 | .515 |
| Wake Forest | 6 | – | 12 | .333 | 17 | – | 16 | .515 |
| Georgia Tech | 6 | – | 12 | .333 | 16 | – | 17 | .485 |
| Notre Dame | 6 | – | 12 | .333 | 15 | – | 17 | .469 |
| Boston College | 4 | – | 14 | .222 | 8 | – | 24 | .250 |
| Virginia Tech | 2 | – | 16 | .111 | 9 | – | 22 | .290 |
† 2014 ACC tournament winner Rankings from AP poll

The 2013–14 Miami Hurricanes men's basketball team represented the University of Miami during the 2013–14 NCAA Division I men's basketball season. The Hurricanes, led by third-year head coach Jim Larrañaga, played their home games at the BankUnited Center and were members of the Atlantic Coast Conference. They finished the season 17–16, 7–11 in ACC play to finish in tenth place. They advanced to the second round of the ACC tournament, where they lost to NC State.

== Previous season ==
The Hurricanes had an overall record of 29–7 and were 15–3 in ACC games. They also had an outright ACC regular-season championship, a conference tournament title (wherein the Hurricanes recorded three double-digit wins), an NCAA tournament No. 2 seed, and a trip to the Sweet 16.

== Offseason ==
=== Departures ===
Departures
| Name | Number | Pos. | Height | Weight | Year | Hometown | Reason for departure |
|---|---|---|---|---|---|---|---|
| Shane Larkin | 0 | G | 5'11" | 176 | Sophomore | Orlando, FL | Declared for 2013 NBA draft |
| Durand Scott | 1 | G | 6'5" | 203 | Senior | Bronx, NY | Graduated |
| Bishop Daniels | 2 | G | 6'3" | 175 | RS freshman | Raleigh, NC | Transferred to ASA College |
| Trey McKinney-Jones | 4 | G | 6'5" | 220 | RS senior | Milwaukee, WI | Graduated |
| Kenny Kadji | 35 | F | 6'11" | 242 | RS senior | Douala, Cameroon | Graduated |
| Reggie Johnson | 42 | C | 6'10" | 292 | Senior | Hialeah, FL | Graduated |
| Julian Gamble | 45 | C | 6'10" | 250 | Senior | Durham, NC | Graduated |

=== Incoming transfers ===
Incoming transfers
| Name | Number | Pos. | Height | Weight | Year | Hometown | Previous school |
|---|---|---|---|---|---|---|---|
| Sheldon McClellan | 10 | G | 6'5" | 206 | Junior | Houston, TX | Texas |
| Angel Rodriguez | 13 | G | 5'11" | 181 | Junior | Cupey, Puerto Rico | Kansas State |
| Donnavan Kirk | 22 | F | 6'9" | 228 | Graduate | Detroit, MI | DePaul |
| James Kelly | 35 | F | 6'7" | 246 | Junior | Ann Arbor, Michigan | Owens CC |

=== 2013 recruiting class ===
College recruiting
| Name | Hometown | School | Height | Weight | Commit date |
|---|---|---|---|---|---|
| DeAndre Burnett; G | Miami, FL | Carol City | 6 ft 1 in (1.85 m) | 180 lb (82 kg) | Mar 17, 2012 |
| DeAndre Burnett; G | Recruit ratings: Rivals: 247Sports: | | | | |
| Davon Reed; F | Ewing, NJ | Princeton Day School | 6 ft 6 in (1.98 m) | 190 lb (86 kg) | Sep 22, 2012 |
| Davon Reed; F | Recruit ratings: Rivals: 247Sports: | | | | |
| Manu Lecomte; G | Brussels, Belgium | Athene des Pagodes | 5 ft 9 in (1.75 m) | 159 lb (72 kg) | Apr 30, 2013 |
| Manu Lecomte; G | Recruit ratings: 247Sports: | | | | |
Overall recruit ranking:
Note: In many cases, Scout, Rivals, 247Sports, On3, and ESPN may conflict in their listings of height and weight.; In these cases, the average was taken. ESPN grades are on a 100-point scale.; Sources: "Miami Hurricanes 2012 Basketball Commitments". Rivals.; "ESPN". ESPN.; "2012 Team Ranking". Rivals.

== Roster ==
2013–14 Miami Hurricanes men's basketball team
Players
Coaches

| Pos. | # | Name | Height | Weight | Year | Hometown |
|---|---|---|---|---|---|---|
| G | 1 | Deandre Burnett (redshirt) | 6 ft 2 in (1.88 m) | 191 lb (87 kg) | Fr | Miami, FL |
| G | 2 | Cornelius Elder (W) | 5 ft 10 in (1.78 m) | 173 lb (78 kg) | Fr | Nashville, TN |
| G | 3 | Steve Sorenson (W) | 6 ft 0 in (1.83 m) | 161 lb (73 kg) | So | Dallas, TX |
| F | 4 | Raphael Akpejiori | 6 ft 9 in (2.06 m) | 241 lb (109 kg) | RS Sr | Lagos, Nigeria |
| G | 5 | Davon Reed | 6 ft 6 in (1.98 m) | 208 lb (94 kg) | Fr | Ewing, NJ |
| G | 10 | Sheldon McClellan (I) (redshirt) | 6 ft 5 in (1.96 m) | 206 lb (93 kg) | Jr | Houston, TX |
| G | 11 | Mike Fernandez | 6 ft 1 in (1.85 m) | 189 lb (86 kg) | Fr | Coral Gables, FL |
| G | 12 | Justin Heller (W) | 6 ft 2 in (1.88 m) | 177 lb (80 kg) | Sr | Boca Raton, FL |
| G | 13 | Angel Rodríguez (I) (redshirt) | 5 ft 11 in (1.8 m) | 181 lb (82 kg) | Jr | Cupey, Puerto Rico |
| G | 15 | Rion Brown | 6 ft 6 in (1.98 m) | 211 lb (96 kg) | Sr | Hinesville, GA |
| G | 20 | Manu Lecomte | 5 ft 9 in (1.75 m) | 159 lb (72 kg) | Fr | Brussels, Belgium |
| F | 21 | Erik Swoope | 6 ft 5 in (1.96 m) | 220 lb (100 kg) | Sr | Lake Elsinore, CA |
| F | 22 | Donnavan Kirk | 6 ft 9 in (2.06 m) | 228 lb (103 kg) | GS | Pontiac, MI |
| C | 23 | Tonye Jekiri | 7 ft 0 in (2.13 m) | 235 lb (107 kg) | So | Hialeah, FL |
| G | 25 | Garrius Adams | 6 ft 6 in (1.98 m) | 200 lb (91 kg) | Sr | Apex, NC |
| F | 35 | James Kelly | 6 ft 7 in (2.01 m) | 246 lb (112 kg) | Jr | Ann Arbor, MI |

Head coach

- Jim Larrañaga (Providence)

Assistant coach(es)

- Eric Konkol (Wisconsin Eau-Claire)
- Michael Huger (Bowling Green)
- Chris Caputo (Westfield State)
- Bryan Beamish (Wisconsin–Stevens Point)

Legend

- (C) Team captain
- (S) Suspended
- (I) Ineligible
- (W) Walk-on
- Injured
- Current redshirt

== Schedule and results ==
| Date time, TV | Rank^{#} | Opponent^{#} | Result | Record | High points | High rebounds | High assists | Site (attendance) city, state |
Exhibition
| Oct 30, 2013*; 7:00 pm | | Florida Tech | W 84–55 | | 20 – Brown | 10 – Tied | 5 – Adams | BankUnited Center (4,848); Coral Gables, FL |
Regular season
| Nov 8, 2013*; 10:00 pm, ESPN3 | | St. Francis Brooklyn | L 62–66 ^{OT} | 0–1 | 16 – Kirk | 10 – Kirk | 3 – Adams | BankUnited Center (6,060); Coral Gables, FL |
| Nov 11, 2013*; 7:00 pm, ESPN3 | | Georgia Southern | W 81–80 | 1–1 | 18 – Kirk | 10 – Kirk | 4 – Brown | BankUnited Center (4,654); Coral Gables, FL |
| Nov 14, 2013*; 7:00 pm, ESPN3 | | Texas Southern | W 84–69 | 2–1 | 17 – Kelly | 11 – Brown | 9 – Brown | BankUnited Center (4,728); Coral Gables, FL |
| Nov 18, 2013*; 7:30 pm, CSS | | at College of Charleston | W 70–54 | 3–1 | 18 – Kelly | 9 – Kirk | 5 – Lecomte | TD Arena (4,018); Charleston, SC |
| Nov 21, 2013*; 7:00 pm, ESPN3 | | UCF | L 58–63 | 3–2 | 20 – Adams | 8 – Adams | 2 – Tied | BankUnited Center (4,895); Coral Gables, FL |
| Nov 28, 2013*; 2:00 pm, ESPNU | | vs. George Washington; Wooden Legacy First Round | L 63–71 ^{OT} | 3–3 | 17 – Adams | 11 – Kirk | 5 – Adams | Titan Gym (1,966); Fullerton, CA |
| Nov 29, 2013*; 6:00 pm, ESPN3 | | at Cal State Fullerton; Wooden Legacy Consolation 2nd round | W 48–46 | 4–3 | 10 – Kelly | 8 – Brown | 2 – Tied | Titan Gym (1,857); Fullerton, CA |
| Dec 1, 2013*; 2:00 pm, ESPN3 | | vs. Arizona State; Wooden Legacy 5th place | W 60–57 | 5–3 | 19 – Reed | 9 – Adams | 4 – Tied | Honda Center (6,007); Anaheim, CA |
| Dec 4, 2013*; 9:30 pm, ESPNU | | at Nebraska; Big Ten-ACC Challenge | L 49–60 | 5–4 | 25 – Brown | 7 – Tied | 4 – Lecomte | Pinnacle Bank Arena (15,088); Lincoln, NE |
| Dec 8, 2013; 12:30 pm, ESPNU | | Virginia Tech | L 60–61 ^{OT} | 5–5 (0–1) | 14 – Adams | 11 – Kirk | 2 – Tied | BankUnited Center (6,270); Coral Gables, FL |
| Dec 19, 2013*; 7:00 pm, CSS | | at Savannah State | W 68–51 | 6–5 | 15 – Kirk | 9 – Kirk | 5 – Brown | Tiger Arena (3,370); Savannah, GA |
| Dec 22, 2013*; 3:00 pm, ESPN3 | | La Salle | W 71–58 | 7–5 | 17 – Brown | 9 – Tied | 4 – Tied | BankUnited Center (4,837); Coral Gables, FL |
| Dec 30, 2013*; 7:00 pm, ESPN3 | | Loyola (MD) | W 71–48 | 8–5 | 17 – Brown | 9 – Kirk | 7 – Reed | BankUnited Center (5,166); Coral Gables, FL |
| Jan 4, 2014; 2:00 pm, ACCN | | at No. 2 Syracuse | L 44–49 | 8–6 (0–2) | 9 – Adams | 5 – Adams | 2 – Tied | Carrier Dome (21,839); Syracuse, NY |
| Jan 8, 2014; 9:00 pm, ESPN2 | | at North Carolina | W 63–57 | 9–6 (1–2) | 19 – Brown | 10 – Tied | 7 – Lecomte | Dean E. Smith Center (17,569); Chapel Hill, NC |
| Jan 15, 2014; 9:00 pm, ACCN | | Florida State | L 53–63 | 9–7 (1–3) | 21 – Tied | 7 – Jekiri | 6 – Lecomte | BankUnited Center (7,413); Coral Gables, FL |
| Jan 18, 2014; 2:00 pm, RSN | | at Georgia Tech | W 56–42 | 10–7 (2–3) | 16 – Lecomte | 7 – Kirk | 3 – Lecomte | McCamish Pavilion (8,072); Atlanta, GA |
| Jan 22, 2014; 7:30 pm, ESPN2 | | No. 18 Duke | L 46–67 | 10–8 (2–4) | 11 – Kirk | 9 – Jekiri | 3 – Adams | BankUnited Center (7,972); Coral Gables, FL |
| Jan 25, 2014; 1:00 pm, CBS | | No. 2 Syracuse | L 52–64 | 10–9 (2–5) | 16 – Reed | 6 – Jekiri | 4 – Tied | BankUnited Center (7,122); Coral Gables, FL |
| Jan 29, 2014; 9:00 pm, RSN | | at Maryland | L 71–74 | 10–10 (2–6) | 25 – Brown | 9 – Kirk | 2 – Tied | Comcast Center (12,061); College Park, MD |
| Feb 1, 2014*; 4:00 pm, ESPN3 | | Norfolk State | W 64–49 | 11–10 | 15 – Brown | 10 – Adams | 4 – Adams | BankUnited Center (5,127); Coral Gables, FL |
| Feb 5, 2014; 7:00 pm, RSN | | No. 25 Pittsburgh | L 55–59 ^{OT} | 11–11 (2–7) | 21 – Brown | 6 – Adams | 3 – Brown | BankUnited Center (5,053); Coral Gables, FL |
| Feb 8, 2014; 2:00 pm, RSN | | NC State | L 55–56 | 11–12 (2–8) | 20 – Brown | 8 – Akpejiori | 3 – Adams | BankUnited Center (6,666); Coral Gables, FL |
| Feb 10, 2014; 9:00 pm, ESPNU | | at Florida State | W 77–73 | 12–12 (3–8) | 16 – Kirk | 6 – Jekiri | 3 – Tied | Donald L. Tucker Civic Center (7,641); Tallahassee, FL |
| Feb 15, 2014; 6:00 pm, ACCN | | at Virginia Tech | L 45–52 | 12–13 (3–9) | 13 – Adams | 10 – Brown | 4 – Adams | Cassell Coliseum (5,105); Blacksburg, VA |
| Feb 19, 2014; 9:00 pm, RSN | | Notre Dame | W 71–64 | 13–13 (4–9) | 21 – Brown | 11 – Brown | 5 – Tied | BankUnited Center (5,133); Coral Gables, FL |
| Feb 22, 2014; 12:00 pm, ACCN | | Boston College | W 69–42 | 14–13 (5–9) | 22 – Brown | 9 – Swoope | 4 – Swoope | BankUnited Center (5,517); Coral Gables, FL |
| Feb 26, 2014; 7:00 pm, RSN | | at No. 12 Virginia | L 40–65 | 14–14 (5–10) | 13 – Swoope | 6 – Jekiri | 2 – Adams | John Paul Jones Arena (11,812); Charlottesville, VA |
| Mar 1, 2014; 12:00 pm, ACCN | | at NC State | W 85–70 | 15–14 (6–10) | 20 – Brown | 13 – Jekiri | 4 – Adams | PNC Arena (13,932); Raleigh, NC |
| Mar 4, 2014; 8:00 pm, ACCN | | at Clemson | L 54–58 | 15–15 (6–11) | 21 – Brown | 5 – Tied | 3 – Brown | Littlejohn Coliseum (7,071); Clemson, SC |
| Mar 8, 2014; 2:00 pm, RSN | | Wake Forest | W 69–56 | 16–15 (7–11) | 22 – Adams | 9 – Jekiri | 6 – Lecomte | BankUnited Center (5,811); Coral Gables, FL |
ACC tournament
| Mar 12, 2014; 3:30 pm, ESPNU | (10) | vs. (15) Virginia Tech; First Round | W 57–53 | 17–15 | 15 – Brown | 12 – Jekiri | 4 – Brown | Greensboro Coliseum (21,533); Greensboro, NC |
| Mar 13, 2014; 7:00 pm, ESPN | (10) | vs. (7) NC State; Second Round | L 58–67 | 17–16 | 22 – Brown | 9 – Jekiri | 3 – Adams | Greensboro Coliseum (21,533); Greensboro, NC |
*Non-conference game. ^{#}Rankings from AP Poll. (#) Tournament seedings in parentheses. All times are in Eastern Time.
