= 2013–14 Davidson Wildcats men's basketball team =

American college basketball season

2013–14 Davidson Wildcats men's basketball

SoCon regular season champions

NIT First round vs. Missouri, L 77–85
- Conference: Southern Conference
- Record: 20–13 (15–1 SoCon)
- Head coach: Bob McKillop (25th season)
- Assistant coaches: Jim Fox; Matt McKillop; Ryan Mee
- Home arena: John M. Belk Arena

2013–14 Southern Conference men's basketball standings
	Conf.				Overall
Team	W		L	PCT	W		L	PCT
Davidson	15	–	1	.938	20	–	13	.606
Chattanooga	12	–	4	.750	18	–	15	.545
Wofford †	11	–	5	.688	20	–	13	.606
Elon	11	–	5	.688	18	–	14	.563
Western Carolina	10	–	6	.625	19	–	15	.559
UNC Greensboro	7	–	9	.438	14	–	18	.438
Georgia Southern	6	–	10	.375	15	–	19	.441
Samford	6	–	10	.375	13	–	20	.394
Appalachian State	5	–	11	.313	9	–	21	.300
Furman	3	–	13	.188	9	–	21	.300
The Citadel	2	–	14	.125	7	–	26	.212
† 2014 SoCon Tournament winner

The 2013–14 Davidson Wildcats men's basketball team represented Davidson College during the 2013–14 NCAA Division I men's basketball season. The Wildcats, led by 25th year head coach Bob McKillop, played their home games at the John M. Belk Arena and were members of the Southern Conference. They finished the season 20–13, 15–1 in SoCon play to win the SoCon regular season championship. They advanced to the semifinals of the SoCon tournament where they lost to Western Carolina. As a regular season conference champion who failed to win their conference tournament, they received an automatic bid to the National Invitation Tournament where they lost in the first round to Missouri.

This was their last season as a member of the SoCon as they announced that they would join the Atlantic 10 Conference, effective July 2014.

== Roster ==
Number	Name	Position	Height	Weight	Year	Hometown
2	Ryan Ansel	Guard	6–2	180	Senior	Fort Washington, Pennsylvania
3	Brian Sullivan	Guard	5–11	175	Sophomore	Arlington, Ohio
4	Tyler Kalinoski	Guard	6–4	175	Junior	Overland Park, Kansas
5	Jordan Barham	Guard	6–4	190	Sophomore	Cleveland, Ohio
12	Jack Gibbs	Guard	5–11	195	Freshman	Westerville, Ohio
13	Joe Aase	Forward	6–18	220	Freshman	Austin, Minnesota
14	Clay Tormey	Guard	5–11	165	Senior	Chicago, Illinois
22	Ali Mackay	Forward	6–11	215	Junior	North Berwick, Scotland
23	Tom Droney	Guard	6–6	200	Senior	Pittsburgh, Pennsylvania
24	De'Mon Brooks	Forward	6–7	227	Senior	Charlotte, North Carolina
25	Jake Belford	Forward	6–9	210	Sophomore	Battle Ground, Washington
31	Manu Gioamoukis	Guard	6–1	180	Freshman	Thessaloniki, Greece
34	Connor Perkey	Forward	6–8	195	Sophomore	Atlanta
35	Chris Czerapowicz	Guard	6–7	200	Senior	Gothenburg, Sweden
40	Andrew McAuliffe	Forward	6–8	235	Freshman	Northbrook, Illinois
41	Will Thoni	Forward	6–3	215	Senior	Sewanee, Tennessee

== Schedule ==
Date time, TV	Rank^{#}	Opponent^{#}	Result	Record	Site (attendance) city, state
Exhibition
11/03/2013*; 7:00 pm		Lenoir-Rhyne	W 108–57		John M. Belk Arena (N/A); Davidson, North Carolina
Regular season
11/08/2013*; 7:00 pm, ESPNU		at No. 4 Duke	L 77–111	0–1	Cameron Indoor Stadium (9,314); Durham, North Carolina
11/11/2013*; 7:00 pm, ESPN3		Milwaukee	L 77–81	0–2	John M. Belk Arena (3,453); Davidson, North Carolina
11/16/2013*; 12:00 pm		vs. No. 25 Virginia	L 57–70	0–3	Time Warner Cable Arena (5,216); Charlotte, North Carolina
11/21/2013*; 5:00 pm, ESPNU		vs. Georgia; Charleston Classic	W 94–82	1–3	TD Arena (2,311); Charleston, South Carolina
11/22/2013*; 9:30 pm, ESPNU		vs. Clemson; Charleston Classic	L 54–85	1–4	TD Arena (2,520); Charleston, South Carolina
11/24/2013*; 12:00 pm, ESPNU		vs. No. 19 New Mexico; Charleston Classic	L 58–79	1–5	TD Arena (1,137); Charleston, South Carolina
11/30/2013*; 1:00 pm		at Stetson	W 86–80	2–5	Edmunds Center (449); DeLand, Florida
12/04/2013*; 7:30 pm		at Charlotte	W 87–78 ^{OT}	3–5	Dale F. Halton Arena (6,595); Charlotte, North Carolina
12/07/2013*; 5:30 pm, MI-Ch 4		Johnson & Wales	W 105–63	4–5	John M. Belk Arena (3,397); Davidson, North Carolina
12/11/2013*; 7:00 pm		vs. Niagara	L 72–83	4–6	First Niagara Center (4,703); Buffalo, New York
12/15/2013*; 2:00 pm, MI-Ch 4		Drexel	L 58–72	4–7	John M. Belk Arena (3,430); Davidson, North Carolina
12/21/2013*; 5:00 pm, ESPNU		at No. 14 North Carolina	L 85–97 ^{OT}	4–8	Dean Smith Center (18,195); Chapel Hill, North Carolina
12/29/2013*; 3:00 pm, KS22		at No. 10 Wichita State	L 70–81	4–9	Charles Koch Arena (10,506); Wichita, Kansas
01/01/2014*; 2:00 pm, CSS		Charleston	L 64–76	4–10	John M. Belk Arena (3,816); Davidson, North Carolina
01/04/2014; 7:00 pm		at Wofford	W 78–63	5–10 (1–0)	Benjamin Johnson Arena (1,590); Spartanburg, South Carolina
01/09/2014; 7:00 pm		at Furman	W 73–56	6–10 (2–0)	Timmons Arena (1,465); Greenville, South Carolina
01/11/2014; 7:00 pm, MI-Ch 4		Appalachian State	W 78–66	7–10 (3–0)	John M. Belk Arena (3,989); Davidson, North Carolina
01/16/2014; 7:00 pm, MI-Ch 4		Elon	L 85–87 ^{OT}	7–11 (3–1)	John M. Belk Arena (3,970); Davidson, North Carolina
01/18/2014; 5:00 pm		at UNC Greensboro	W 93–82	8–11 (4–1)	Greensboro Coliseum (2,740); Greensboro, North Carolina
01/23/2014; 3:00 pm		at Western Carolina	W 82–77	9–11 (5–1)	Ramsey Center (3,002); Cullowhee, North Carolina
01/25/2014; 7:00 pm, MI-Ch 4		Georgia Southern	W 82–52	10–11 (6–1)	John M. Belk Arena (3,753); Davidson, North Carolina
01/30/2014; 7:00 pm, MI-Ch 4		Chattanooga	W 94–51	11–11 (7–1)	John M. Belk Arena (3,343); Davidson, North Carolina
02/01/2014; 4:00 pm, MI-Ch 4		The Citadel	W 62–43	12–11 (8–1)	John M. Belk Arena (4,193); Davidson, North Carolina
02/06/2014; 7:00 pm		at Samford	W 109–88	13–11 (9–1)	Pete Hanna Center (1,056); Homewood, Alabama
02/08/2014; 7:00 pm, MI-Ch 4		Furman	W 65–50	14–11 (10–1)	John M. Belk Arena (3,797); Davidson, North Carolina
02/15/2014; 2:00 pm		at Georgia Southern	W 88–73	15–11 (11–1)	Hanner Fieldhouse (1,093); Statesboro, Georgia
02/17/2014; 7:05 pm		at The Citadel; Postponed from 2/12	W 83–76	16–11 (12–1)	McAlister Field House (1,582); Charleston, South Carolina
02/22/2014; 7:00 pm, ESPN3		Wofford	W 59–49	17–11 (13–1)	John M. Belk Arena (4,095); Davidson, North Carolina
02/27/2014; 7:00 pm, MI-Ch 4		UNC Greensboro	W 79–46	18–11 (14–1)	John M. Belk Arena (3,309); Davidson, North Carolina
03/01/2014; 7:00 pm		at Elon	W 86–69	19–11 (15–1)	Alumni Gym (1,871); Elon, North Carolina
SoCon tournament
03/08/2014; 12:00 pm, ESPN3		vs. Samford; Quarterfinals	W 77–54	20–11	U.S. Cellular Center (5,898); Asheville, North Carolina
03/09/2014; 6:00 pm, CSS		vs. Western Carolina; Semifinals	L 97–99 ^{OT}	20–12	U.S. Cellular Center (5,434); Asheville, North Carolina
NIT
03/18/2014*; 9:00 pm, ESPN2	No. (7)	at (2) Missouri; First round	L 77–85	20–13	Mizzou Arena (N/A); Columbia, Missouri
*Non-conference game. ^{#}Rankings from AP Poll, (#) during NIT is seed within region. (#) Tournament seedings in parentheses. All times are in Eastern Time.
