= 2014 Southern Conference men's basketball tournament =

US college basketball tournament

- Classification: Division I
- Season: 2013–14
- Teams: 11
- Site: U.S. Cellular Center; Asheville, North Carolina
- Champions: Wofford (3rd title)
- Winning coach: Mike Young (3rd title)
- MVP: Karl Cochran (Wofford)
- Attendance: 5,799 (Championship game)
- Television: ESPN3, ESPN2

2013–14 Southern Conference men's basketball standings
	Conf.				Overall
Team	W		L	PCT	W		L	PCT
Davidson	15	–	1	.938	20	–	13	.606
Chattanooga	12	–	4	.750	18	–	15	.545
Wofford †	11	–	5	.688	20	–	13	.606
Elon	11	–	5	.688	18	–	14	.563
Western Carolina	10	–	6	.625	19	–	15	.559
UNC Greensboro	7	–	9	.438	14	–	18	.438
Georgia Southern	6	–	10	.375	15	–	19	.441
Samford	6	–	10	.375	13	–	20	.394
Appalachian State	5	–	11	.313	9	–	21	.300
Furman	3	–	13	.188	9	–	21	.300
The Citadel	2	–	14	.125	7	–	26	.212
† 2014 SoCon Tournament winner

The 2014 Southern Conference men's basketball tournament took place between Friday, March 7 and Monday, March 10 in Asheville, North Carolina, at the U.S. Cellular Center. The entire tournament was streamed on ESPN3, with the Southern Conference Championship Game televised by ESPN2. The champion received an automatic bid into the 2014 NCAA tournament.

It was the last Southern Conference tournament for four teams that officially left the conference on July 1, 2014. Appalachian State and Georgia Southern, which upgraded their football programs to the top-level Division I FBS, joined the FBS Sun Belt Conference. Davidson became a member of the Atlantic 10 Conference. Elon joined the Colonial Athletic Association.

Despite all of these departures, the championship game was contested between two teams who remained in the Southern Conference. Western Carolina reached the championship by coming back from double-digit deficits, including a 15-point second-half deficit to regular season champion Davidson in the semifinals. In the championship game, it looked like history might repeat itself, as the Catamounts came back from an 11-point deficit to as close as 1. However, Trey Sumler missed a last-second three-point shot to tie the game, and Wofford won their 3rd conference championship.

== Seeds ==
Seed	School	Conference	Overall	Tiebreaker
1	Davidson†#	15–1	20–12	
2	Chattanooga#	12–4	18–14	
3	Wofford#	11–5	20–12	1–0 vs Elon
4	Elon#	11–5	18–14	0–1 vs Wofford
5	Western Carolina#	10–6	19–15	
6	UNC Greensboro	7–9	14–18	
7	Georgia Southern	6–10	15–19	1–0 vs Samford
8	Samford	6–10	13–20	0–1 vs Georgia Southern
9	Appalachian State	5–11	9–21	
10	Furman	3–13	9–21	
11	The Citadel	2–14	7–26	
† – Southern Conference regular season champions, and tournament No. 1 seed. # – Received a first round bye in the conference tournament.

== Bracket ==
First round Friday, March 7
8	Samford	70
9	Appalachian State	56
7	Georgia Southern	65
10	Furman	50
6	UNC Greensboro	76
11	The Citadel	86

Quarterfinals; Saturday, March 8 ESPN3
1	Davidson	77
8	Samford	54
4	Elon	64
5	Western Carolina	66
2	Chattanooga	55
7	Georgia Southern	62
3	Wofford	68
11	The Citadel	51

Semifinals; Sunday, March 9 ESPN3
1	Davidson	97
5	Western Carolina	99^{OT}
7	Georgia Southern	57
3	Wofford	71

Championship; Monday, March 10; ESPN2
5	Western Carolina	53
3	Wofford	56

== All-tournament team ==
First Team

- De'Mon Brooks, Davidson
- Brandon Boggs, Western Carolina
- James Sinclair, Western Carolina
- Karl Cochran, Wofford
- Lee Skinner, Wofford

Second Team

- Ashton Moore, The Citadel
- Z. Mason, Chattanooga
- Tawaski King, Western Carolina
- Trey Sumler, Western Carolina
- Eric Garcia, Wofford
