= 2013–14 Georgia Southern Eagles men's basketball team =

American college basketball season

2013–14 Georgia Southern Eagles men's basketball
- Conference: Southern Conference
- Record: 15–19 (6–10 SoCon)
- Head coach: Mark Byington (1st season)
- Assistant coaches: Randy Peele; Larry Dixon; Andrew Wilson
- Home arena: Hanner Fieldhouse

2013–14 Southern Conference men's basketball standings
	Conf.				Overall
Team	W		L	PCT	W		L	PCT
Davidson	15	–	1	.938	20	–	13	.606
Chattanooga	12	–	4	.750	18	–	15	.545
Wofford †	11	–	5	.688	20	–	13	.606
Elon	11	–	5	.688	18	–	14	.563
Western Carolina	10	–	6	.625	19	–	15	.559
UNC Greensboro	7	–	9	.438	14	–	18	.438
Georgia Southern	6	–	10	.375	15	–	19	.441
Samford	6	–	10	.375	13	–	20	.394
Appalachian State	5	–	11	.313	9	–	21	.300
Furman	3	–	13	.188	9	–	21	.300
The Citadel	2	–	14	.125	7	–	26	.212
† 2014 SoCon Tournament winner

The 2013–14 Georgia Southern Eagles men's basketball team represented Georgia Southern University during the 2013–14 NCAA Division I men's basketball season. The Eagles, led by first year head coach Mark Byington, played their home games at Hanner Fieldhouse and were members of the Southern Conference. They finished the season 15–19, 6–10 in SoCon play to finish in a tie for seventh place. They advanced to the semifinals of the SoCon tournament where they lost to Wofford.

This was their last season as a member of the SoCon as they will join the Sun Belt Conference in July, 2014.

== Roster ==
Number	Name	Position	Height	Weight	Year	Hometown
0	Torlorf Thomas	Guard	6–4	190	Freshman	Meridian, Mississippi
1	Kameron Dunnican	Forward	6–8	210	Junior	Sumter, South Carolina
2	Sam Mike	Forward	6–7	230	Senior	Decatur, Georgia
3	Eric Ferguson	Forward	6–8	200	Senior	Statesboro, Georgia
4	Curtis Diamond	Guard	6–3	170	Junior	Lithonia, Georgia
5	Jelani Hewitt	Guard	6–2	185	Junior	Miramar, Florida
10	Bryan Marseille	Guard	6–5	210	Sophomore	Brooklyn, New York
11	Tre Bussey	Guard	6–3	170	Senior	Lithia Springs, Georgia
12	Brian Holmes	Guard	6–1	190	Senior	Sanford, Florida
13	Angel Matias	Forward	6–4	225	Junior	San Juan, Puerto Rico
14	Zach Altany	Guard	6–4	190	Junior	Statesboro, Georgia
21	Cole Rives	Guard	6–0	190	Sophomore	Suwanee, Georgia
23	Chris Daniels	Guard	6–5	210	Sophomore	Decatur, Georgia
24	Bryce Woodliff	Guard	6–0	175	Freshman	Roanoke, Virginia
30	Scott Kelly	Forward	6–5	210	Freshman	Milton, Georgia
35	Kyle Doyle	Forward	6–6	210	Freshman	Hephzibah, Georgia
40	Grayson Clark	Guard	6–2	185	Freshman	Milton, Georgia
44	Trent Wiedeman	Forward	6–8	255	Senior	Suwanee, Georgia
	Kertiss Bisden	Forward	6–7	220	Freshman	Atlanta

== Schedule ==
Date time, TV	Opponent	Result	Record	Site (attendance) city, state
Exhibition
11/01/2013*; 7:00 pm	Thomas	W 88–49		Hanner Fieldhouse (735); Statesboro, Georgia
Regular season
11/08/2013*; 7:30 pm	Columbia International	W 110–74	1–0	Hanner Fieldhouse (1,211); Statesboro, Georgia
11/11/2013*; 7:30 pm	at Miami (FL)	L 80–81 ^{OT}	1–1	BankUnited Center (4,654); Coral Gables, Florida
11/16/2013*; 8:00 pm	Toccoa Falls	W 104–50	2–1	Hanner Fieldhouse (1,526); Statesboro, Georgia
11/21/2013*; 7:00 pm	at West Virginia; Cancún Challenge	L 68–101	2–2	WVU Coliseum (4,814); Morgantown, West Virginia
11/23/2013*; 3:00 pm	at Old Dominion; Cancún Challenge	L 69–86	2–3	Ted Constant Convocation Center (4,814); Norfolk, Virginia
11/26/2013*; 3:00 pm	vs. Oral Roberts; Cancún Challenge	L 65–67	2–4	Moon Palace Resort (203); Cancún, MX
11/27/2013*; 1:30 pm	vs. Presbyterian; Cancún Challenge	W 76–66	3–4	Moon Palace Resort (934); Cancún, MX
11/30/2013*; 7:00 pm	Campbell	L 73–75 ^{OT}	3–5	Hanner Fieldhouse (517); Statesboro, Georgia
12/04/2013*; 7:00 pm	Brewton–Parker	W 75–66	4–5	Hanner Fieldhouse (1,220); Statesboro, Georgia
12/07/2013*; 6:00 pm	at South Carolina State	W 79–61	5–5	SHM Memorial Center (302); Orangeburg, South Carolina
12/15/2013*; 7:00 pm, CSS	at UAB	L 62–84	5–6	Bartow Arena (3,167); Birmingham, Alabama
12/18/2013*; 7:00 pm	Kennesaw State	W 73–55	6–6	Hanner Fieldhouse (1,159); Statesboro, Georgia
12/20/2013*; 7:00 pm	at Georgia State	L 61–73	6–7	GSU Sports Arena (1,893); Atlanta, Georgia
12/28/2013*; 6:00 pm	at North Carolina A&T	W 66–63	7–7	Corbett Sports Center (1,401); Greensboro, North Carolina
12/30/2013*; 7:00 pm	at Campbell	L 63–69	7–8	Pope Convocation Center (1,270); Buies Creek, North Carolina
01/04/2014; 2:00 pm	Samford	W 80–78	8–8 (1–0)	Hanner Fieldhouse (1,018); Statesboro, Georgia
01/11/2014; 2:00 pm	Western Carolina	L 67–68	8–9 (1–1)	Hanner Fieldhouse (1,372); Statesboro, Georgia
01/16/2014; 7:00 pm	Furman	W 88–81 ^{OT}	9–9 (2–1)	Hanner Fieldhouse (1,746); Statesboro, Georgia
01/18/2014; 2:00 pm	at Appalachian State	L 68–81	9–10 (2–2)	George M. Holmes Convocation Center (1,249); Boone, North Carolina
01/23/2014; 7:00 pm	Wofford	L 64–74	9–11 (2–3)	Hanner Fieldhouse (2,030); Statesboro, Georgia
01/25/2014; 7:00 pm	at Davidson	L 52–82	9–12 (2–4)	John M. Belk Arena (3,753); Davidson, North Carolina
01/30/2014; 7:00 pm	The Citadel	W 83–52	10–12 (3–4)	Hanner Fieldhouse (1,613); Statesboro, Georgia
02/01/2014; 5:00 pm	at UNC Greensboro	W 64–62	11–12 (4–4)	Greensboro Coliseum (4,485); Greensboro, North Carolina
02/06/2014; 7:00 pm	at Wofford	L 61–74	11–13 (4–5)	Benjamin Johnson Arena (1,446); Spartanburg, North Carolina
02/08/2014; 7:00 pm, ESPN3	at Elon	L 59–60	11–14 (4–6)	Alumni Gym (1,427); Elon, North Carolina
02/13/2014; 2:00 pm	UNC Greensboro	L 56–68	11–15 (4–7)	Hanner Fieldhouse (1,543); Statesboro, Georgia
02/15/2014; 2:00 pm	Davidson	L 73–88	11–16 (4–8)	Hanner Fieldhouse (1,093); Statesboro, Georgia
02/20/2014; 7:00 pm	at Chattanooga	W 77–61	12–16 (5–8)	McKenzie Arena (3,743); Chattanooga, Tennessee
02/22/2014; 2:00 pm	Elon	L 61–66	12–17 (5–9)	Hanner Fieldhouse (1,312); Statesboro, Georgia
02/27/2014; 7:00 pm	at Furman	W 82–73	13–17 (6–9)	Timmons Arena (1,018); Greenville, South Carolina
03/01/2014; 7:00 pm	at The Citadel	L 63–80	13–18 (6–10)	McAlister Field House (1,168); Charleston, South Carolina
2014 SoCon tournament
03/07/2014; 1:30 pm, ESPN3	vs. Furman; First round	W 65–50	14–18	U.S. Cellular Center (3,123); Asheville, North Carolina
03/08/2014; 6:00 pm, ESPN3	vs. Chattanooga; Quarterfinals	W 62–55	15–18	U.S. Cellular Center (3,811); Asheville, North Carolina
03/09/2014; 8:30 pm, CSS	vs. Wofford; Semifinals	W 71–57	15–19	U.S. Cellular Center (5,434); Asheville, North Carolina
*Non-conference game. ^{#}Rankings from AP Poll. (#) Tournament seedings in parentheses. All times are in Eastern Time.
