= 2013–14 The Citadel Bulldogs basketball team =

American college basketball season

2013–14 The Citadel Bulldogs basketball
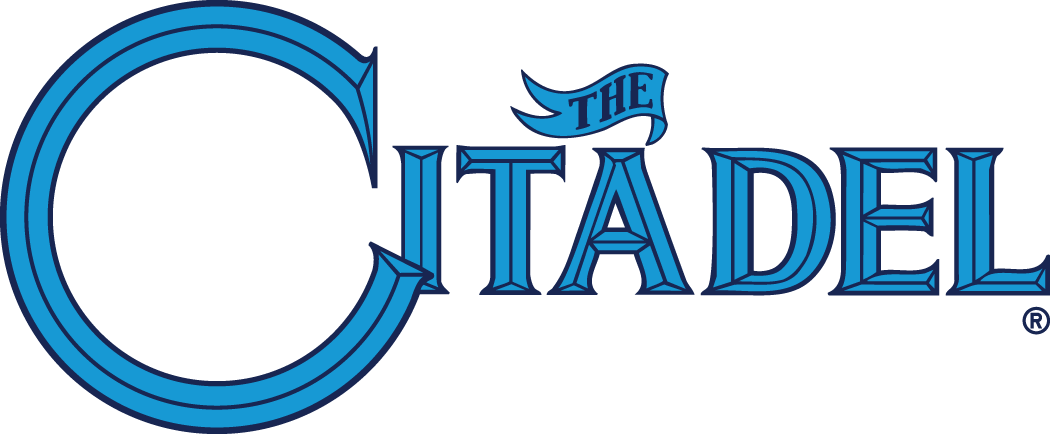
- Conference: Southern Conference
- Record: 7–26 (2–14 SoCon)
- Head coach: Chuck Driesell
- Assistant coaches: Rob Burke; J. D. Powell; Justin Argenal
- Home arena: McAlister Field House

2013–14 Southern Conference men's basketball standings
	Conf.				Overall
Team	W		L	PCT	W		L	PCT
Davidson	15	–	1	.938	20	–	13	.606
Chattanooga	12	–	4	.750	18	–	15	.545
Wofford †	11	–	5	.688	20	–	13	.606
Elon	11	–	5	.688	18	–	14	.563
Western Carolina	10	–	6	.625	19	–	15	.559
UNC Greensboro	7	–	9	.438	14	–	18	.438
Georgia Southern	6	–	10	.375	15	–	19	.441
Samford	6	–	10	.375	13	–	20	.394
Appalachian State	5	–	11	.313	9	–	21	.300
Furman	3	–	13	.188	9	–	21	.300
The Citadel	2	–	14	.125	7	–	26	.212
† 2014 SoCon Tournament winner

The 2013–14 The Citadel Bulldogs basketball team represented The Citadel, The Military College of South Carolina in the 2013–14 NCAA Division I men's basketball season. The Bulldogs were led by fourth year head coach Chuck Driesell and played their home games at McAlister Field House. They played a member of the Southern Conference. They finished the season 7–26, 2–14 in SoCon play to finish in last place. They advanced to the quarterfinals of the SoCon tournament where they lost to Wofford.

== Preseason ==
The Citadel was picked to finish last in the 11 team SoCon by both the media and coaches. No Bulldogs were named to the Coaches' preseason All-Conference team.

=== Recruiting ===
College recruiting information
Name	Hometown	School	Height	Weight	Commit date
Brian White; PF	Richmond, VA	John Marshall High School	6 ft 7 in (2.01 m)	180 lb (82 kg)	Nov 8, 2011
Brian White; PF	Recruit ratings: ESPN: (66)				
Nate Bowser; C	Fort Worth, TX	Fort Worth Country Day School	6 ft 8 in (2.03 m)	N/A	Sep 13, 2012
Nate Bowser; C	Recruit ratings: (NR)				
Tom Koopman; PF	Weert	Basketball Academy of Limburg	6 ft 8 in (2.03 m)	210 lb (95 kg)	
Tom Koopman; PF	Recruit ratings: (NR)				
Warren Sledge; SG	Keller, TX	Central High School	6 ft 3 in (1.91 m)	180 lb (82 kg)	
Warren Sledge; SG	Recruit ratings: (NR)				
Overall recruit ranking:
Note: In many cases, Scout, Rivals, 247Sports, On3, and ESPN may conflict in their listings of height and weight.; In these cases, the average was taken. ESPN grades are on a 100-point scale.; Sources: "ESPN – Citadel Basketball Recruiting 2013". ESPN.; "2013 Team Ranking". Rivals.

== Roster ==
Despite a pre-season decision to give up basketball due to back injuries, P. J. Horgan returned to the Bulldogs on January 6, 2014.

Number	Name	Position	Height	Weight	Year	Hometown
0	Dylen Setzekorn	Guard/Forward	6–7	194	RS–Sophomore	Gainesville, Georgia
1	Raemond Robinson	Guard/Forward	6–3	189	Sophomore	Goose Creek, South Carolina
5	Warren Sledge	Guard	6–3	180	Freshman	Keller, Texas
10	Marshall Harris III	Guard	6–1	180	Junior	San Antonio, Texas
11	Tom Koopman	Center	6–8	210	Freshman	Weert, Netherlands
12	Ashton Moore	Guard	6–0	172	Junior	Suffolk, Virginia
25	C. J. Bray	Forward	6–7	238	RS–Sophomore	Charleston, South Carolina
30	Matt van Scyoc	Guard/Forward	6–6	218	Sophomore	Green Lake, Wisconsin
32	Brian White	Forward	6–6	180	Freshman	Richmond, Virginia
33	Quinton Marshall	Guard	6–5	205	Sophomore	Raleigh, North Carolina
34	Nate Bowser	Forward/Center	6–9	210	Freshman	Fort Worth, Texas
44	P. J. Horgan	Center	6–9	220	Junior	Rio Rancho, New Mexico

== Schedule ==
The Bulldogs played games against Tennessee, Wake Forest, Navy, and Nebraska, in addition to the All-Military Classic featuring VMI, Army, and Air Force. The home slate included fourteen games, including cross-town rival College of Charleston and in-state rival Presbyterian. The SoCon schedule included home and home series with Appalachian State, Davidson, Furman, Georgia Southern, Western Carolina, and Wofford. Chattanooga and Samford visited McAlister Field House while The Citadel traveled to Elon and UNC Greensboro.

The Bulldogs endured a 17-game losing streak, longest within one season in school history, before winning their final two regular season games. The Citadel then claimed just their twelfth ever SoCon Tournament win over UNC Greensboro before recording their sixty first tournament loss against Wofford in the quarterfinals.

Date time, TV	Opponent	Result	Record	Site (attendance) city, state
Regular season
November 8*; 3:30 pm, ESPNU	at VMI; All-Military Classic	L 71–82	0–1	Cameron Hall (3,419); Lexington, VA
November 9*; 6:00 pm, ESPN3	vs. Army; All-Military Classic	L 69–84	0–2	Cameron Hall (1,705); Lexington, VA
November 12*; 8:05 pm	Presbyterian	W 82–68	1–2	McAlister Field House (1,211); Charleston, SC
November 16*; 7:05 pm	North Greenville	W 83–53	2–2	McAlister Field House (828); Charleston, SC
November 18*; 7:00 pm, FSN	at Tennessee; Battle 4 Atlantis Opening Round	L 60–86	2–3	Thompson–Boling Arena (13,394); Knoxville, TN
November 21*; 7:00 pm, ESPN3	at Wake Forest; Battle 4 Atlantis Opening Round	L 54–82	2–4	LJVM Coliseum (6,234); Winston–Salem, NC
November 25*; 7:05 pm	Montreat	W 109–64	3–4	McAlister Field House (693); Charleston, SC
November 29*; 5:00 pm	at Towson; Battle 4 Atlantis Mainland	L 59–84	3–5	SECU Arena (1,293); Towson, MD
November 30*; 3:00 pm	vs. West Alabama; Battle 4 Atlantis Mainland	L 77–90	3–6	Towson Center (1,087); Towson, MD
December 4*; 7:00 pm	at Navy	L 74–79	3–7	Alumni Hall (755); Annapolis, MD
December 7*; 2:05 pm	Gardner–Webb	L 55–67	3–8	McAlister Field House (755); Charleston, SC
December 18*; 7:05 pm	Brevard	W 79–68	4–8	McAlister Field House (901); Charleston, SC
December 21*; 8:30 pm	at Nebraska	L 62–77	4–9	Pinnacle Bank Arena (14,987); Lincoln, NE
December 29*; 2:05 pm	College of Charleston	L 48–72	4–10	McAlister Field House (2,803); Charleston, SC
January 2*; 5:30 pm	at Radford	L 59–76	4–11	Dedmon Center (479); Radford, VA
January 6; 7:05 pm, CSS	Chattanooga	L 78–82	4–12 (0–1)	McAlister Field House (723); Charleston, SC
January 9; 7:00 pm	at Wofford	L 75–79 ^{OT}	4–13 (0–2)	Benjamin Johnson Arena (1,217); Spartanburg, SC
January 11; 7:00 pm	at Elon	L 65–74	4–14 (0–3)	Alumni Gym (1,309); Elon, NC
January 16; 7:00 pm	at UNC Greensboro	L 65–69 ^{OT}	4–15 (0–4)	Greensboro Coliseum (2,139); Greensboro, NC
January 18; 7:05 pm	Furman	L 71–76	4–16 (0–5)	McAlister Field House (1,433); Charleston, SC
January 23; 7:05 pm	Appalachian State	L 67–80	4–17 (0–6)	McAlister Field House (1,322); Charleston, SC
January 25; 7:05 pm	Western Carolina	L 60–78	4–18 (0–7)	McAlister Field House (1,372); Charleston, SC
January 30; 7:00 pm	at Georgia Southern	L 52–83	4–19 (0–8)	Hanner Fieldhouse (1,613); Statesboro, GA
February 1; 4:00 pm	at Davidson	L 43–62	4–20 (0–9)	John M. Belk Arena (4,193); Davidson, NC
February 6; 7:00 pm	at Appalachian State	L 45–54	4–21 (0–10)	Holmes Center (820); Boone, NC
February 8; 7:05 pm	Wofford	L 56–77	4–22 (0–11)	McAlister Field House (1,333); Charleston, SC
February 15; 4:00 pm	at Furman	L 67–76	4–23 (0–12)	Timmons Arena (1,277); Greenville, SC
February 17; 7:05 pm	Davidson; Postponed from 2/12	L 76–83	4–24 (0–13)	McAlister Field House (1,582); Charleston, SC
February 22; 2:00 pm	at Western Carolina	L 52–70	4–25 (0–14)	Ramsey Center (1,241); Cullowhee, NC
February 24; 7:05 pm, CSS	Samford	W 81–71	5–25 (1–14)	McAlister Field House (1,299); Charleston, SC
March 1; 7:05 pm	Georgia Southern	W 80–63	6–25 (2–14)	McAlister Field House (1,168); Charleston, SC
2014 SoCon Tournament
March 7; 4:00 pm, ESPN3	vs. (6) UNC Greensboro; First round	W 86–76	7–25	U.S. Cellular Center (3,123); Asheville, NC
March 8; 8:30 pm, ESPN3	vs. (3) Wofford; Quarterfinals	L 51–68	7–26	U.S. Cellular Center (3,811); Asheville, NC
*Non-conference game. (#) Tournament seedings in parentheses. All times are in Eastern Time.
