= Jason Capel =

American college basketball coach (born 1980)

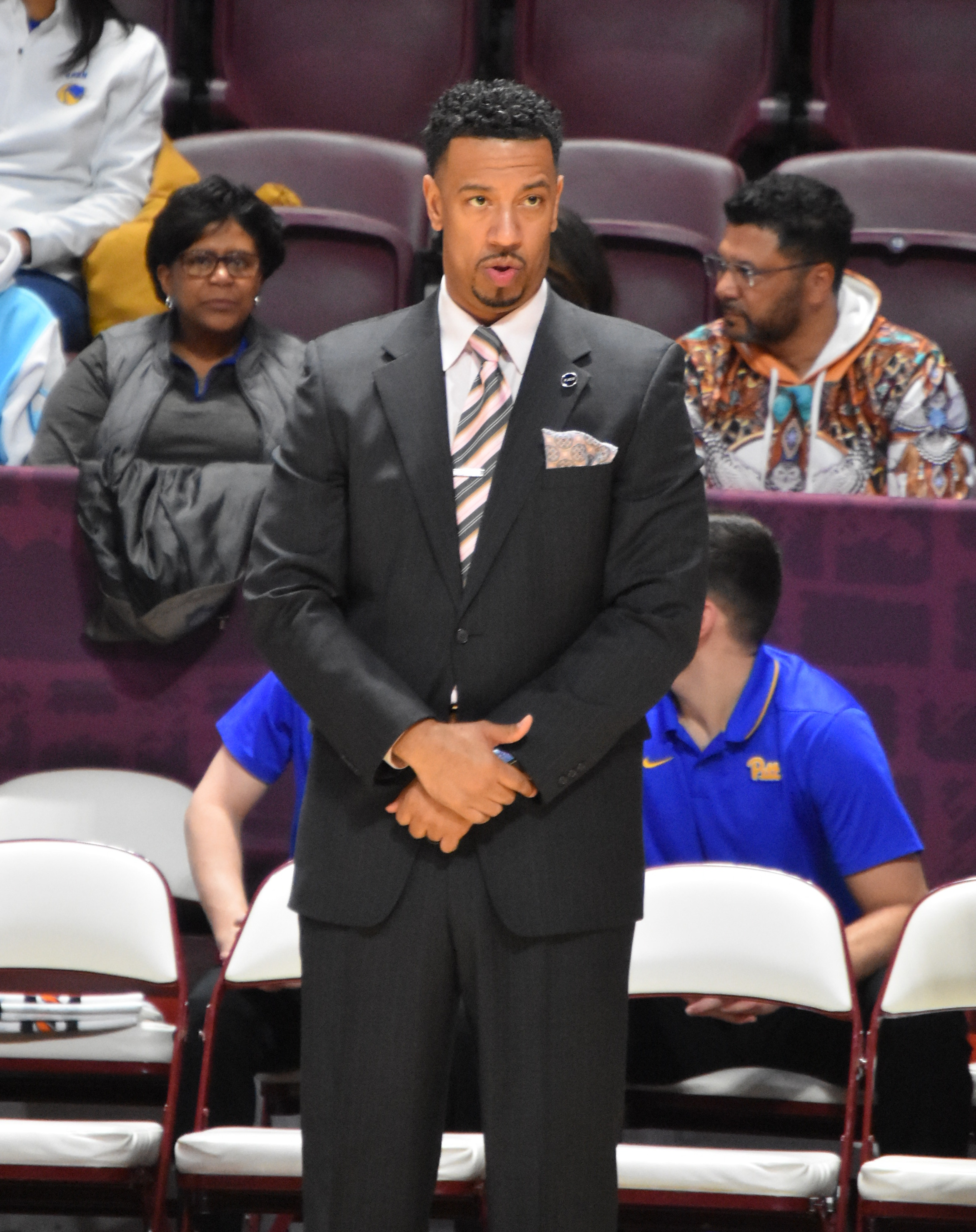

Biographical details
- Born: January 15, 1980 (age 46); Fayetteville, North Carolina, U.S.

Playing career
- 1998–2002: North Carolina
- Position: Small forward

Coaching career (HC unless noted)
- 2009–2010: Appalachian State (assistant)
- 2010–2014: Appalachian State
- 2018–2026: Pittsburgh (assistant)

Head coaching record
- Overall: 53–70

Accomplishments and honors

Awards
- As player: 2× Third-team All-ACC (2001, 2002); McDonald's All-American (1998); Second-team Parade All-American (1998); Virginia Mr. Basketball (1996)

Jason Maurice Capel (born January 15, 1980) is an American college basketball coach, most recently an assistant at Pittsburgh. He was previously the 15th head coach of the Appalachian State Mountaineers men's basketball team.

He is a former basketball player for the North Carolina Tar Heels, and is the brother of Jeff Capel, former Duke University basketball player and current University of Pittsburgh head coach. Capel provided color commentary for ACC basketball games on Raycom Sports during the 2007–2008 college basketball season. As of January 2018, he was a commentator for Bein Sports. He is a member of the Kappa Alpha Psi fraternity. He is married to his college sweetheart Ashley Heath, also a graduate of UNC.

== Playing career ==
At a height of 6 feet and 8 inches and a weight of 220 pounds, Capel played the small forward position. Born in Fayetteville, North Carolina, Capel was the 1996 Virginia Mr. Basketball and is only one of nine players to ever start for UNC's basketball team in all four years of his eligibility. He led the Tar Heels in scoring in his senior year with 15.6 points per game. He also played in the NCAA Final Four in 2000.

Capel went undrafted in the National Basketball Association's NBA draft in 2002. Though he briefly made the Charlotte Bobcats' roster, he never played in an NBA game. He then turned down more lucrative offers in Europe to play basketball in the NBA D-League for the Fayetteville Patriots, a team coached by his father Jeff Capel II. After two years in the D-League (2002–04) he played professionally in Japan for the Aisin Seahorses (2004–05).

He played for BT Roseto of the Italian Serie A league in 2005–2006, and from July to December 2006 he played with Air Avellino in the same league. Capel wrapped up his professional career in Serbia playing for KK Crvena zvezda of the Naša Sinalko Liga in 2007.

== Coaching career ==
Capel joined the staff of Buzz Peterson at Appalachian in 2009 as an assistant coach. Following the departure of Buzz Peterson for the head coach job at UNCW, on April 19, 2010, rumors surfaced that Capel had been offered the top spot on the Appalachian basketball coaching staff. On April 21, it was confirmed in a press conference that Capel was the new head coach of the Mountaineers, the 15th in program history. Capel's contract was not renewed after the 2013–14 season when the Mountaineers finished with a 9–21 record, the third straight year the Mountaineers had a losing record under Capel's leadership.

Capel joined the staff at Pittsburgh in 2018. He was fired in March 2026.

Record table
| Season | Team | Overall | Conference | Standing | Postseason |
|---|---|---|---|---|---|
Appalachian State Mountaineers (Southern Conference) (2010–2014)
| 2010–11 | Appalachian State | 16–15 | 10–8 | 3rd (North) | |
| 2011–12 | Appalachian State | 13–18 | 7–11 | 5th (North) | |
| 2012–13 | Appalachian State | 15–16 | 10–8 | T–2nd (North) | |
| 2013–14 | Appalachian State | 9–21 | 5–11 | 9th | |
| Appalachian State: | | 53–70 (.431) | 32–35 (.478) | | |
| Total: | | 53–70 (.431) | | | |
National champion Postseason invitational champion Conference regular season champion Conference regular season and conference tournament champion Division regular season champion Division regular season and conference tournament champion Conference tournament champion
