= 2013–14 North Carolina Tar Heels men's basketball team =

American college basketball season

2013–14 North Carolina Tar Heels men's basketball

Hall of Fame Tip Off champions

NCAA tournament, Round of 32
- Conference: Atlantic Coast Conference

Ranking
- Coaches: No. 21
- AP: No. 19
- Record: 24–10 (13–5 ACC)
- Head coach: Roy Williams (11th season)
- Assistant coaches: Steve Robinson (11th season); C. B. McGrath (11th season); Hubert Davis (2nd season)
- Home arena: Dean E. Smith Center

2013–14 ACC men's basketball standings
| | Conf. | | | | Overall |
| Team | W | | L | PCT | W | | L | PCT |
|---|---|---|---|---|---|---|---|---|
| No. 3 Virginia † | 16 | – | 2 | .889 | 30 | – | 7 | .811 |
| No. 14 Syracuse | 14 | – | 4 | .778 | 28 | – | 6 | .824 |
| No. 8 Duke | 13 | – | 5 | .722 | 26 | – | 9 | .743 |
| No. 19 North Carolina | 13 | – | 5 | .722 | 24 | – | 10 | .706 |
| Pittsburgh | 11 | – | 7 | .611 | 26 | – | 10 | .722 |
| Clemson | 10 | – | 8 | .556 | 23 | – | 13 | .639 |
| NC State | 9 | – | 9 | .500 | 22 | – | 14 | .611 |
| Maryland | 9 | – | 9 | .500 | 17 | – | 15 | .531 |
| Florida State | 9 | – | 9 | .500 | 22 | – | 14 | .611 |
| Miami (FL) | 7 | – | 11 | .389 | 17 | – | 16 | .515 |
| Wake Forest | 6 | – | 12 | .333 | 17 | – | 16 | .515 |
| Georgia Tech | 6 | – | 12 | .333 | 16 | – | 17 | .485 |
| Notre Dame | 6 | – | 12 | .333 | 15 | – | 17 | .469 |
| Boston College | 4 | – | 14 | .222 | 8 | – | 24 | .250 |
| Virginia Tech | 2 | – | 16 | .111 | 9 | – | 22 | .290 |
† 2014 ACC tournament winner Rankings from AP poll

The 2013–14 North Carolina Tar Heels men's basketball team represented the University of North Carolina at Chapel Hill during the 2013–14 NCAA Division I men's basketball season. The team's head coach was Roy Williams, who is in his 11th season as UNC's head men's basketball coach. They played their home games at the Dean E. Smith Center as members of the Atlantic Coast Conference. They finished the season 24–10, 13–5 in ACC play to finish in a tie for third place. They lost in the quarterfinals of the ACC tournament to Pittsburgh. They received an at-large bid to the NCAA tournament where they defeated Providence in the second round before losing in the third round to Iowa State.

== Pre-season ==
The Tar Heels entered the 2013–14 season lost two starters from the previous season as Dexter Strickland graduated and second team All-ACC shooting guard Reggie Bullock declared for the 2013 NBA draft. However, rising juniors and potential draft picks James Michael McAdoo and P. J. Hairston decided to return to Chapel Hill and UNC brought in a strong recruiting class including McDonald's All-Americans Kennedy Meeks and Isaiah Hicks.

Another offseason change involved the coaching staff as long-time Roy Williams assistant Joe Holladay retired. UNC alum Brad Frederick joined the staff as Director of Basketball Operations in June. Frederick came from the coaching staff at Vanderbilt, where he had been for 14 seasons. He is the son of former Kansas Athletic Director Bob Frederick.

However, the optimism of the Spring turned to uncertainty in the Summer as both Hairston and fifth year senior Leslie McDonald were both suspended from the team due to eligibility concerns, leaving only two scholarship guards (sophomore Marcus Paige and freshman Nate Britt) on the roster entering the season. McDonald would be reinstated in the non-conference season, but Hairston's suspension would hold for the entire season.

Even with this uncertainty, North Carolina was voted #13 in the AP preseason poll and #11 in the USA Today Coaches' Poll. The ACC media tabbed the Tar Heels third in the conference preseason poll.

=== Departures ===
| Name | Number | Pos. | Height | Weight | Year | Hometown | Notes |
|---|---|---|---|---|---|---|---|
| Reggie Bullock | 35 | F/G | 6'7" | 205 | Junior | Kinston, NC | Declared for the NBA draft |
| Dexter Strickland | 1 | G | 6'3" | 180 | Senior | Rahway, NJ | Graduated |

=== Recruits ===
North Carolina recruits at the 2013 McDonald's All-American Boys Game

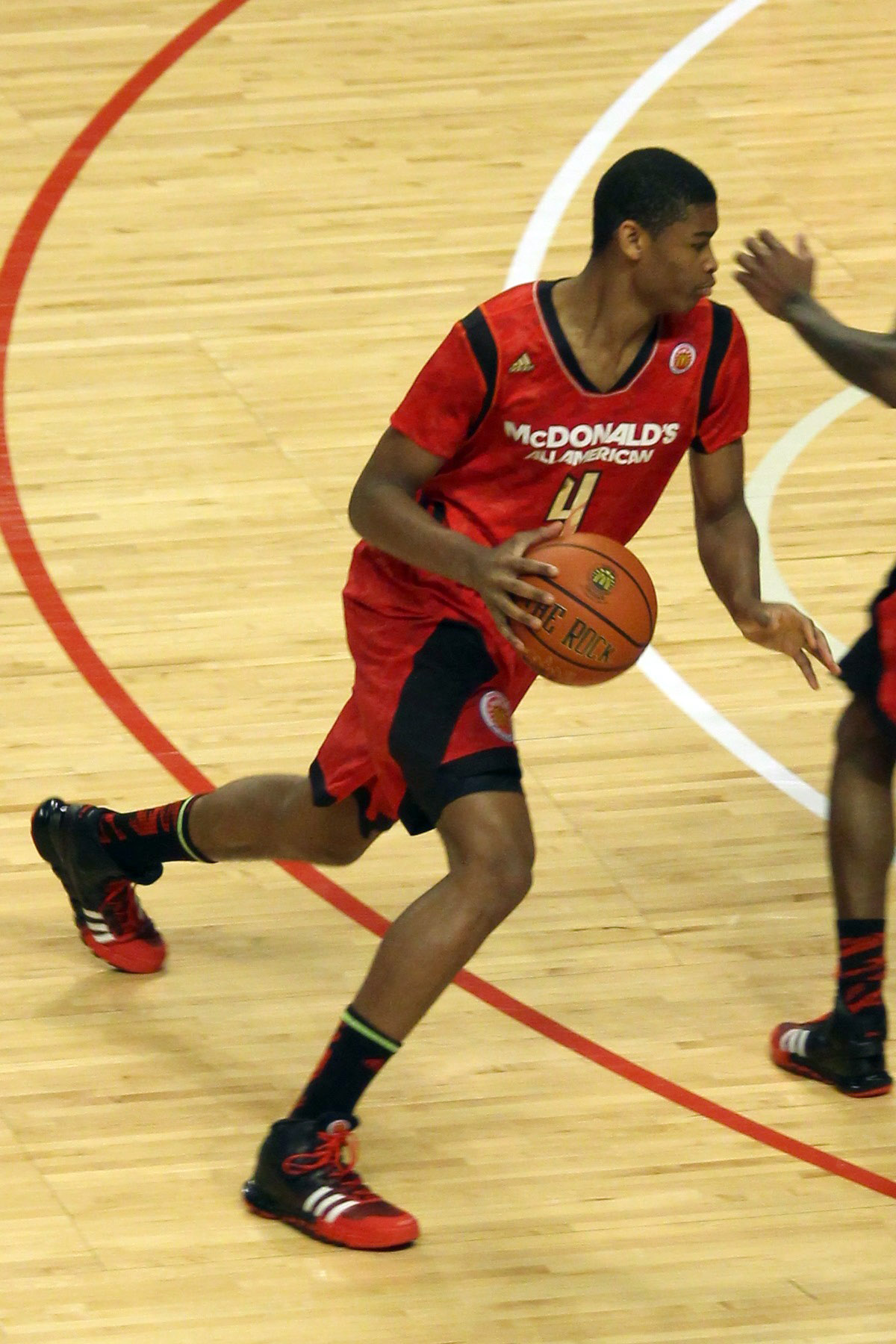
Isaiah Hicks

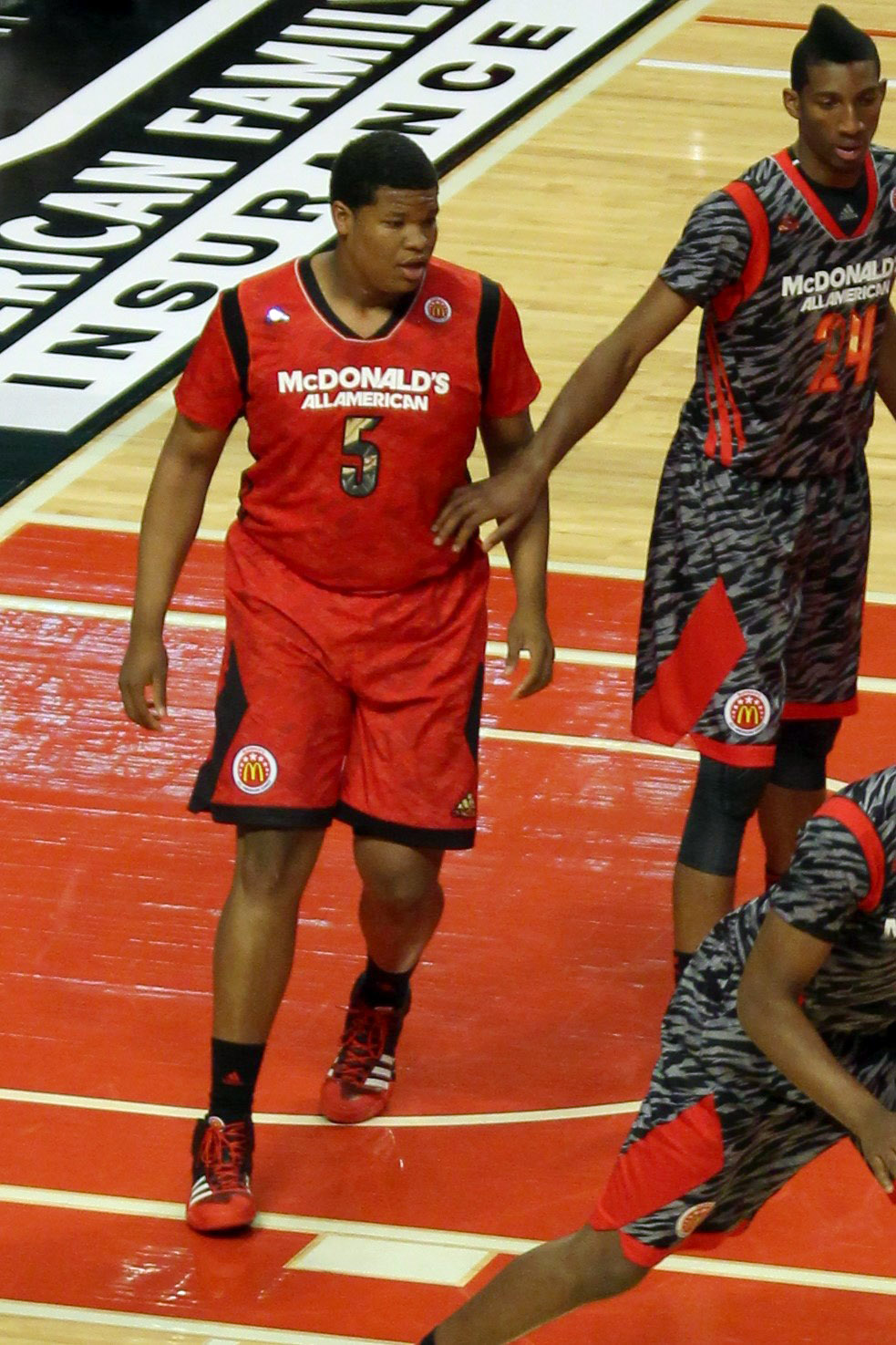
Kennedy Meeks

College recruiting information
| Name | Hometown | School | Height | Weight | Commit date |
|---|---|---|---|---|---|
| Nate Britt; PG | Washington, DC | Oak Hill Academy | 6 ft 1 in (1.85 m) | 165 lb (75 kg) | Nov 29, 2011 |
| Nate Britt; PG | Recruit ratings: Scout: Rivals: (86) | | | | |
| Isaiah Hicks; F | Oxford, NC | J.F. Webb High School | 6 ft 8 in (2.03 m) | 210 lb (95 kg) | Aug 8, 2011 |
| Isaiah Hicks; F | Recruit ratings: Scout: Rivals: (91) | | | | |
| Kennedy Meeks; C | Charlotte, NC | West Charlotte | 6 ft 9 in (2.06 m) | 275 lb (125 kg) | Nov 16, 2012 |
| Kennedy Meeks; C | Recruit ratings: Scout: Rivals: (86) | | | | |
Overall recruit ranking:
Note: In many cases, Scout, Rivals, 247Sports, On3, and ESPN may conflict in their listings of height and weight.; In these cases, the average was taken. ESPN grades are on a 100-point scale.; Sources:

The top-rated recruit in the class scheduled to start college in Fall 2013 is Isaiah Hicks, the eighth ranked power forward and the 18th ranked player in the ESPN 100. Shortly behind him in that ranking is Kennedy Meeks at #59. He is the #6 ranked center in the 2013 high school class. Britt is the 52nd ranked player in the current high school class and 11th point guard. He tore his meniscus in December 2012.

- Isaiah Hicks: 18th ranked player in ESPN 100, eight-ranked power forward, named to the 2013 McDonald's All-America game In his last high school basketball game he had 34 points, 30 rebounds and seven blocks in a win in his division's state championship game.
- Kennedy Meeks: 59th ranked player in ESPN 100, #6 ranked center, and named to the 2013 McDonald's All-America game
- Nate Britt: 52nd ranked player, 11th-ranked point guard

== Roster ==
2013–14 North Carolina Tar Heels men's basketball team
Players
Coaches

| Pos. | # | Name | Height | Weight | Year | Previous school | Hometown |
|---|---|---|---|---|---|---|---|
| G | 0 | Nate Britt | 5 ft 11 in (1.8 m) | 165 lb (75 kg) | Fr | Oak Hill (VA) | Upper Marlboro, Maryland |
| G | 2 | Leslie McDonald | 6 ft 5 in (1.96 m) | 215 lb (98 kg) | RS Sr | Briarcrest Christian School | Memphis, Tennessee |
| C | 3 | Kennedy Meeks | 6 ft 9 in (2.06 m) | 290 lb (132 kg) | Fr | West Charlotte | Charlotte, North Carolina |
| G | 4 | Luke Davis | 6 ft 0 in (1.83 m) | 175 lb (79 kg) | RS Jr | Ravenscroft School | Raleigh, North Carolina |
| G | 5 | Marcus Paige | 6 ft 1 in (1.85 m) | 175 lb (79 kg) | So | Linn-Mar | Marion, Iowa |
| F | 11 | Brice Johnson | 6 ft 9 in (2.06 m) | 210 lb (95 kg) | So | Edisto | Orangeburg, South Carolina |
| F | 13 | J. P. Tokoto | 6 ft 5 in (1.96 m) | 200 lb (91 kg) | So | Menomonee Falls | Menomonee Falls, Wisconsin |
| F | 14 | Desmond Hubert | 6 ft 10 in (2.08 m) | 225 lb (102 kg) | Jr | New Egypt | Cream Ridge, New Jersey |
| G | 15 | P. J. Hairston (I) | 6 ft 6 in (1.98 m) | 220 lb (100 kg) | Jr | Hargrave Military Academy | Greensboro, North Carolina |
| F | 21 | Jackson Simmons | 6 ft 7 in (2.01 m) | 225 lb (102 kg) | Jr | Smoky Mountain | Webster, North Carolina |
| F | 22 | Isaiah Hicks | 6 ft 8 in (2.03 m) | 220 lb (100 kg) | Fr | J.F. Webb | Oxford, North Carolina |
| F | 30 | James Manor (W) | 6 ft 6 in (1.98 m) | 220 lb (100 kg) | Sr | Chapel Hill | Carrboro, North Carolina |
| F | 34 | Denzel Robinson (W) | 6 ft 4 in (1.93 m) | 220 lb (100 kg) | Sr | Chapel Hill | Chapel Hill, North Carolina |
| F | 42 | Joel James | 6 ft 10 in (2.08 m) | 280 lb (127 kg) | So | Dwyer | West Palm Beach, Florida |
| F | 43 | James Michael McAdoo | 6 ft 9 in (2.06 m) | 230 lb (104 kg) | Jr | Norfolk Christian | Norfolk, Virginia |
| G | 55 | Wade Moody (W) | 6 ft 0 in (1.83 m) | 175 lb (79 kg) | Sr | Mount Airy | Mount Airy, North Carolina |

Head coach

- Roy Williams (North Carolina)

Assistant coach(es)

- Steve Robinson (Radford)
- C. B. McGrath (Kansas)
- Hubert Davis (North Carolina)

Legend

- (C) Team captain
- (S) Suspended
- (I) Ineligible
- (W) Walk-on
- Injured
- Current redshirt

Roster
Last update: 12/08/13

- Note that the roster is subject to change.

== Season ==
=== Non-conference play ===
The Tar Heels started the season with uncertainty as Hairston's and McDonald's eligibility cases remained in limbo for the first nine games of the season. After uneventful victories over Oakland and Holy Cross, the Heels were stunned 83–80 at home by Belmont, in part because of a 22–48 performance at the free throw line. However, the team would redeem themselves by beating #3 Louisville in the Hall of Fame Tip Off championship. Marcus Paige led the team with 32 points while post players Brice Johnson and Kennedy Meeks controlled the paint and the Heels won 93–84. Paige was named ACC Player of the Week for his performance against the Cardinals and the Richmond Spiders in the previous game (26 points).

North Carolina's inconsistency would show itself again as the Heels lost their next game - an 83–86 contest at UAB, coached by former Roy Williams assistant Jerod Haase. But true to form, the Heels bounced back and beat #1 Michigan State on the road in a game they never trailed. Kennedy Meeks led the team in scoring with 15 and was named ACC Rookie of the Week. After an easy home win over UNC Greensboro (coached by Wes Miller, another Williams disciple), the Tar Heels completed a sweep of the top three teams in the preseason polls by upending #11 Kentucky at the Dean Smith Center. Paige and James Michael McAdoo were the stars, scoring 23 and 20 points respectively.

On December 18, the team received the news that Leslie McDonald would be reinstated in time for the Texas game at the Smith Center. However, the Tar Heels lost to the young Longhorns. North Carolina finished their non-conference season with wins over Davidson, Northern Kentucky and UNC Wilmington.

=== Conference play ===
The Tar Heels started 1–4 in conference play, but then, they won twelve straight, including a win over #5 Duke on February 20. With the Duke win, North Carolina became the first team to defeat each of the AP Poll preseason top 4 in the same season in the 53 years that the poll has released preseason rankings. The streak was broken with a loss at Duke in Cameron Indoor Stadium.

== Schedule and results ==
| Date time, TV | Rank^{#} | Opponent^{#} | Result | Record | High points | High rebounds | High assists | Site (attendance) city, state |
Exhibition
| Nov 1*; 7:30 pm, GoHeels TV | No. 12 | UNC Pembroke | W 82–63 | – | 19 – McAdoo | 10 – Tied | 3 – Tied | Dean E. Smith Center (N/A); Chapel Hill, NC |
Non-conference regular season
| Nov 8*; 9:00 pm, RSN | No. 12 | Oakland | W 84–61 | 1–0 | 21 – McAdoo | 9 – McAdoo | 5 – Tied | Dean E. Smith Center (15,102); Chapel Hill, NC |
| Nov 15*; 8:00 pm, ESPNU | No. 12 | Holy Cross; 2013 Hall of Fame Tip Off | W 62–54 | 2–0 | 23 – Paige | 8 – Meeks | 5 – Tokoto | Dean E. Smith Center (15,833); Chapel Hill, NC |
| Nov 17*; 4:00 pm, ESPNU | No. 12 | Belmont; 2013 Hall of Fame Tip Off | L 80–83 | 2–1 | 27 – McAdoo | 13 – McAdoo | 5 – Paige | Dean E. Smith Center (15,205); Chapel Hill, NC |
| Nov 23*; 12:00 pm, ESPN3 | No. 24 | vs. Richmond; 2013 Hall of Fame Tip Off semifinals | W 82–72 | 3–1 | 26 – Paige | 12 – Johnson | 3 – Paige | Mohegan Sun Arena (8,113); Uncasville, CT |
| Nov 24*; 1:00 pm, ESPN | No. 24 | vs. No. 3 Louisville; 2013 Hall of Fame Tip Off championship | W 93–84 | 4–1 | 32 – Paige | 12 – Meeks | 7 – Meeks | Mohegan Sun Arena (N/A); Uncasville, CT |
| Dec 1*; 6:00 pm, FS1 | No. 16 | at UAB | L 59–63 | 4–2 | 16 – Tokoto | 7 – Johnson | 5 – Paige | Bartow Arena (8,313); Birmingham, AL |
| Dec 4*; 9:00 pm, ESPN | | at No. 1 Michigan State; ACC–Big Ten Challenge | W 79–65 | 5–2 | 15 – Meeks | 10 – Tokoto | 5 – Paige | Breslin Center (14,797); East Lansing, MI |
| Dec 7*; 7:00 pm, ESPNU | | UNC Greensboro | W 81–50 | 6–2 | 14 – Johnson | 8 – Meeks | 8 – Paige | Dean E. Smith Center (15,676); Chapel Hill, NC |
| Dec 14*; 5:15 pm, ESPN | No. 18 | No. 11 Kentucky; Rivalry | W 82–77 | 7–2 | 23 – Paige | 7 – Johnson | 4 – McAdoo | Dean E. Smith Center (21,750); Chapel Hill, NC |
| Dec 18*; 7:00 pm, ESPN2 | No. 14 | Texas | L 83–86 | 7–3 | 23 – Paige | 9 – Johnson | 7 – Britt | Dean E. Smith Center (17,143); Chapel Hill, NC |
| Dec 21*; 5:00 pm, ESPNU | No. 14 | Davidson | W 97–85 ^{OT} | 8–3 | 22 – Tokoto | 11 – Tokoto | 5 – Tied | Dean E. Smith Center (18,195); Chapel Hill, NC |
| Dec 27*; 7:00 pm, ESPNU | No. 19 | Northern Kentucky | W 75–60 | 9–3 | 14 – McAdoo | 9 – Paige | 4 – Tokoto | Dean E. Smith Center (18,842); Chapel Hill, NC |
| Dec 31*; 5:00 pm, ESPNU | No. 19 | UNC Wilmington | W 84–51 | 10–3 | 23 – McAdoo | 10 – McAdoo | 6 – Britt | Dean E. Smith Center (16,923); Chapel Hill, NC |
ACC regular season
| Jan 5; 8:00 pm, ESPNU | No. 19 | at Wake Forest | L 67–73 | 10–4 (0–1) | 13 – McAdoo | 9 – 3 tied | 6 – Paige | LJVM Coliseum (12,462); Winston-Salem, NC |
| Jan 8; 9:00 pm, ESPN2 | | Miami (FL) | L 57–63 | 10–5 (0–2) | 12 – McAdoo | 12 – McAdoo | 8 – Paige | Dean E. Smith Center (17,569); Chapel Hill, NC |
| Jan 11; 12:00 pm, ESPN | | at No. 2 Syracuse | L 45–57 | 10–6 (0–3) | 15 – McAdoo | 9 – McAdoo | 3 – Tokoto | Carrier Dome (32,121); Syracuse, NY |
| Jan 18; 12:00 pm, ESPN | | Boston College | W 82–71 | 11–6 (1–3) | 21 – Paige | 6 – Tied | 6 – Tokoto | Dean E. Smith Center (18,115); Chapel Hill, NC |
| Jan 20; 7:00 pm, ESPN | | at Virginia; Big Monday | L 61–76 | 11–7 (1–4) | 15 – Meeks | 9 – Meeks | 3 – Tied | John Paul Jones Arena (13,045); Charlottesville, VA |
| Jan 26; 6:00 pm, ESPNU | | Clemson | W 80–61 | 12–7 (2–4) | 22 – McAdoo | 8 – Meeks | 5 – Paige | Dean E. Smith Center (18,616); Chapel Hill, NC |
| Jan 29; 7:00 pm, ESPN2 | | at Georgia Tech | W 78–65 | 13–7 (3–4) | 19 – Paige | 10 – Meeks | 7 – Paige | McCamish Pavilion (5,124); Atlanta, GA |
| Feb 1; 1:00 pm, ESPN | | NC State | W 80–74 | 14–7 (4–4) | 20 – McDonald | 13 – McAdoo | 5 – Paige | Dean E. Smith Center (21,750); Chapel Hill, NC |
| Feb 4; 8:00 pm, ACCN | | Maryland | W 75–63 | 15–7 (5–4) | 25 – Paige | 9 – Tokoto | 7 – Paige | Dean E. Smith Center (17,225); Chapel Hill, NC |
| Feb 8; 12:00 pm, ACCN | | at Notre Dame | W 73–62 | 16–7 (6–4) | 18 – McAdoo | 8 – McAdoo | 9 – Paige | Purcell Pavilion (9,149); South Bend, IN |
| Feb 15; 1:00 pm, CBS | | No. 25 Pittsburgh | W 75–71 | 17–7 (7–4) | 24 – McAdoo | 12 – McAdoo | 4 – Tied | Dean E. Smith Center (20,341); Chapel Hill, NC |
| Feb 17; 7:00 pm, ESPN | | at Florida State; Big Monday | W 81–75 | 18–7 (8–4) | 23 – Meeks | 11 – Johnson | 7 – Paige | Donald L. Tucker Center (7,814); Tallahassee, FL |
| Feb 20; 9:00 pm, ESPN/ACCN | | No. 5 Duke; Rivalry/Postponed from 2/12 | W 74–66 | 19–7 (9–4) | 21 – McDonald | 10 – McAdoo | 4 – Paige | Dean E. Smith Center (21,750); Chapel Hill, NC |
| Feb 22; 12:00 pm, ACCN | | Wake Forest | W 105–72 | 20–7 (10–4) | 19 – McDonald | 5 – Johnson | 5 – Tokoto | Dean E. Smith Center (19,248); Chapel Hill, NC |
| Feb 26; 8:00 pm, ACCN | No. 19 | at NC State | W 85–84 ^{OT} | 21–7 (11–4) | 35 – Paige | 10 – Tied | 5 – Tied | PNC Arena (19,500); Raleigh, NC |
| Mar 1; 2:30 pm, ACCN | No. 19 | at Virginia Tech | W 60–56 | 22–7 (12–4) | 15 – McAdoo | 7 – Tied | 3 – Tied | Cassell Coliseum (6,546); Blacksburg, VA |
| Mar 3; 7:00 pm, ESPN | No. 14 | Notre Dame; Big Monday | W 63–61 | 23–7 (13–4) | 14 – McAdoo | 9 – McAdoo | 6 – Paige | Dean E. Smith Center (15,175); Chapel Hill, NC |
| Mar 8; 9:00 pm, ESPN | No. 14 | at No. 4 Duke; ESPN College GameDay | L 81–93 | 23–8 (13–5) | 24 – Paige | 5 – Tokoto | 4 – Britt | Cameron Indoor Stadium (9,314); Durham, NC |
ACC Tournament
| Mar 14; 2:00 pm, ESPN2/ACCN | No. 15 | vs. Pittsburgh; Quarterfinals | L 75–80 | 23–9 | 27 – Paige | 7 – Tied | 5 – Britt | Greensboro Coliseum (21,533); Greensboro, NC |
NCAA tournament
| Mar 21*; 7:20 pm, TNT | No. 19 (6 E) | vs. (11 E) Providence; Second round | W 79–77 | 24–9 | 19 – Paige | 10 – McAdoo | 6 – Tokoto | AT&T Center (11,690); San Antonio, TX |
| Mar 23*; 5:15 pm, CBS | No. 19 (6 E) | vs. No. 9 (3 E) Iowa State; Third round | L 83–85 | 24–10 | 19 – Paige | 13 – Meeks | 3 – Britt | AT&T Center (13,431); San Antonio, TX |
*Non-conference game. ^{#}Rankings from AP Poll, (#) denotes seed within region E=East. (#) Tournament seedings in parentheses. All times are in Eastern Time.

== Team players drafted into the NBA ==
| Year | Round | Pick | Player | NBA club |
| 2015 | 2 | 58 | J. P. Tokoto | Philadelphia 76ers |
| 2016 | 1 | 25 | Brice Johnson | Los Angeles Clippers |
| 2016 | 2 | 55 | Marcus Paige | Brooklyn Nets |
