= 2013–14 Furman Paladins men's basketball team =

American college basketball season

2013–14 Furman Paladins men's basketball
- Conference: Southern Conference
- Record: 9–21 (3–13 SoCon)
- Head coach: Niko Medved (1st season)
- Assistant coaches: Bob Richey; Jay McAuley; Dorian Green
- Home arena: Timmons Arena

2013–14 Southern Conference men's basketball standings
	Conf.				Overall
Team	W		L	PCT	W		L	PCT
Davidson	15	–	1	.938	20	–	13	.606
Chattanooga	12	–	4	.750	18	–	15	.545
Wofford †	11	–	5	.688	20	–	13	.606
Elon	11	–	5	.688	18	–	14	.563
Western Carolina	10	–	6	.625	19	–	15	.559
UNC Greensboro	7	–	9	.438	14	–	18	.438
Georgia Southern	6	–	10	.375	15	–	19	.441
Samford	6	–	10	.375	13	–	20	.394
Appalachian State	5	–	11	.313	9	–	21	.300
Furman	3	–	13	.188	9	–	21	.300
The Citadel	2	–	14	.125	7	–	26	.212
† 2014 SoCon Tournament winner

The 2013–14 Furman Paladins men's basketball team represented Furman University during the 2013–14 NCAA Division I men's basketball season. The Paladins, led by first-year head coach Niko Medved, played their home games at Timmons Arena in Greenville, South Carolina and were members of the Southern Conference (SoCon). They finished the season 9–21, 3–13 in SoCon play, to finish in tenth place. They lost in the first round of the SoCon tournament to Georgia Southern.

== Roster ==
Number	Name	Position	Height	Weight	Year	Hometown
4	T. K. Hayes	Guard	6'1"	175	Freshman	Chester, NJ
5	Aaron O'Neill	Guard	6'0"	180	Junior	Cincinnati, OH
10	Jordan Loyd	Guard	6'3"	200	Sophomore	Atlanta, GA
12	Charlie Reddick	Guard/Forward	6'5"	200	Senior	Powder Springs, GA
14	Stephen Croone	Guard	6'0"	170	Sophomore	Covington, GA
21	Kris Acox	Forward	6'6"	215	Freshman	Reykjavík, Iceland
22	William Gates Jr.	Guard	6'1"	180	Freshman	Schertz, TX
23	Adonis Rwabigwi	Forward	6'8"	220	Freshman	Kigali, Rwanda
24	Larry Wideman	Guard	6'4"	190	Sophomore	Loris, SC
30	Kendrec Ferrara	Forward	6'9"	235	Sophomore	Cape Coral, FL
31	Damien Leonard	Guard	6'4"	190	Junior	Greenville, SC
32	Keith Belfield	Guard/Forward	6'6"	205	Sophomore	Charlotte, NC
35	Dominic Early	Guard/Forward	6'5"	185	Sophomore	Atlanta, GA
42	Kevin Chuisseu	Forward	6'8"	230	Sophomore	Douala, Cameroon

== Schedule ==
Date time, TV	Opponent	Result	Record	Site (attendance) city, state
Exhibition
November 1, 2013*; 7:30 p.m.	North Greenville	W 85–61		Timmons Arena (1,210); Greenville, SC
Regular season
November 8, 2013*; 7:30 p.m.	Sawanee	W 66–49	1–0	Timmons Arena (1,272); Greenville, SC
November 12, 2013*; 7:30 p.m.	Gardner–Webb	W 75–64	2–0	Timmons Arena (1,043); Greenville, SC
November 15, 2013*; 6:00 p.m., CSS/ESPN3	Florida Gulf Coast	L 69–70	2–1	Timmons Arena (1,657); Greenville, SC
November 23, 2013*; 6:00 p.m.	at College of Charleston	L 55–89	2–2	TD Arena (3,223); Charleston, SC
November 26, 2013*; 7:00 p.m., ESPN3	at Virginia Tech	L 54–75	2–3	Cassell Coliseum (3,470); Blacksburg, VA
November 30, 2013*; 12:00 p.m.	Brevard	W 89–72	3–3	Timmons Arena (567); Greenville, SC
December 4, 2013*; 7:00 p.m.	at Fordham	L 48–79	3–4	Rose Hill Gymnasium (1,462); The Bronx, NY
December 7, 2013*; 7:00 p.m.	at Presbyterian	W 74–59	4–4	Templeton Physical Education Center (950); Clinton, SC
December 10, 2013*; 7:00 p.m.	Mars Hill	L 93–97	4–5	Timmons Arena (959); Greenville, SC
December 14, 2013*; 7:00 p.m., ESPN3	at Clemson	L 35–71	4–6	Littlejohn Coliseum (6,485); Clemson, SC
December 20, 2013*; 7:00 p.m.	Liberty	W 86–83	5–6	Timmons Arena (865); Greenville, SC
December 28, 2013*; 6:00 p.m., P12N	at California	L 60–90	5–7	Haas Pavilion (9,143); Berkeley, CA
December 30, 2013*; 10:00 p.m.	at UC Davis	W 75–65	6–7	The Pavilion (631); Davis, CA
January 4, 2014; 4:00 p.m., ESPN3	Chattanooga	L 63–72	6–8 (0–1)	Timmons Arena (1,020); Greenville, SC
January 6, 2014; 7:00 p.m.	at UNC Greensboro	L 82–90	6–9 (0–2)	Greensboro Coliseum (1,720); Greensboro, NC
January 9, 2014; 7:00 p.m.	Davidson	L 56–73	6–10 (0–3)	Timmons Arena (1,465); Greenville, SC
January 11, 2014; 7:00 p.m.	at Samford	L 55–57	6–11 (0–4)	Pete Hanna Center (1,236); Homewood, AL
January 16, 2014; 7:00 p.m.	at Georgia Southern	L 81–88 ^{OT}	6–12 (0–5)	Hanner Fieldhouse (1,746); Statesboro, GA
January 18, 2014; 7:00 p.m.	at The Citadel	W 76–71	7–12 (1–5)	McAlister Field House (1,433); Charleston, SC
January 25, 2014; 2:00 p.m.	Wofford	L 52–76	7–13 (1–6)	Timmons Arena (1,812); Greenville, SC
February 1, 2014; 7:00 p.m.	at Chattanooga	L 52–67	7–14 (1–7)	McKenzie Arena (5,023); Chattanooga, TN
February 3, 2014; 6:00 p.m.	Samford; Postponed from January 30	L 68–76	7–15 (1–8)	Timmons Arena (1,004); Greenville, SC
February 8, 2014; 7:00 p.m.	at Davidson	L 50–65	7–16 (1–9)	John M. Belk Arena (3,797); Davidson, NC
February 10, 2014; 7:00 p.m., CSS/ESPN3	at Western Carolina	L 75–83	7–17 (1–10)	Ramsey Center (1,065); Cullowhee, NC
February 15, 2014; 4:00 p.m.	The Citadel	W 76–67	8–17 (2–10)	Timmons Arena (1,277); Greenville, SC
February 20, 2014; 7:00 p.m.	at Wofford	L 50–70	8–18 (2–11)	Benjamin Johnson Arena (1,712); Spartanburg, SC
February 22, 2014; 2:00 p.m.	Appalachian State	W 68–53	9–18 (3–11)	Timmons Arena (1,362); Greenville, SC
February 24, 2014; 7:00 p.m.	Elon; Postponed from February 12	L 49–78	9–19 (3–12)	Timmons Arena (926); Greenville, SC
February 27, 2014; 7:00 p.m.	Georgia Southern	L 73–82	9–20 (3–13)	Timmons Arena (1,018); Greenville, SC
SoCon tournament
March 7, 2014; 1:30 p.m., ESPN3	vs. Georgia Southern; First round	L 50–65	9–21	U.S. Cellular Center (3,123); Asheville, NC
*Non-conference game. ^{#}Rankings from AP poll. (#) Tournament seedings in parentheses. All times are in Eastern.
