= 2013–14 Samford Bulldogs basketball team =

American college basketball season

2013–14 Samford Bulldogs men's basketball
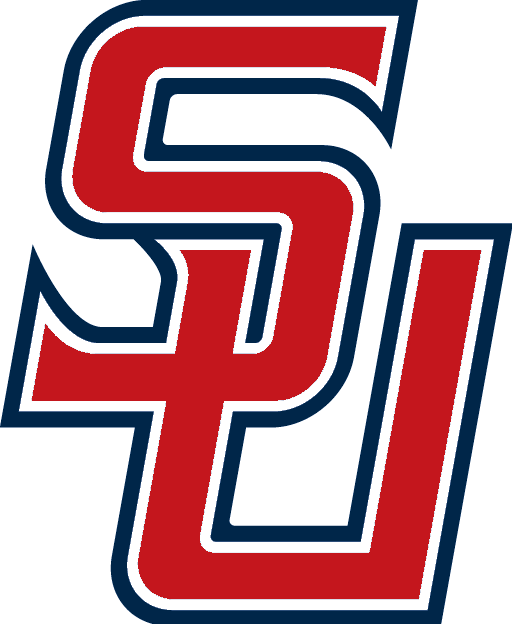
- Conference: Southern Conference
- Record: 13–20 (6–10 SoCon)
- Head coach: Bennie Seltzer (2nd season)
- Assistant coaches: Scott Padgett; Yasir Rosemond; Jake Headrick
- Home arena: Pete Hanna Center

2013–14 Southern Conference men's basketball standings
	Conf.				Overall
Team	W		L	PCT	W		L	PCT
Davidson	15	–	1	.938	20	–	13	.606
Chattanooga	12	–	4	.750	18	–	15	.545
Wofford †	11	–	5	.688	20	–	13	.606
Elon	11	–	5	.688	18	–	14	.563
Western Carolina	10	–	6	.625	19	–	15	.559
UNC Greensboro	7	–	9	.438	14	–	18	.438
Georgia Southern	6	–	10	.375	15	–	19	.441
Samford	6	–	10	.375	13	–	20	.394
Appalachian State	5	–	11	.313	9	–	21	.300
Furman	3	–	13	.188	9	–	21	.300
The Citadel	2	–	14	.125	7	–	26	.212
† 2014 SoCon Tournament winner

The 2013–14 Samford Bulldogs basketball team represented Samford University during the 2013–14 NCAA Division I men's basketball season. The Bulldogs, led by second year head coach Bennie Seltzer, played their home games at the Pete Hanna Center and were members of the Southern Conference. They finished the season 13–20, 6–10 in SoCon play to finish in a tie for seventh place. They advanced to the quarterfinals of the SoCon tournament where they lost to Davidson.

After only two seasons and a record of 24–41, head coach Bennie Seltzer was fired. The main reason given for his dismissal was the transfer of 14 players in his two seasons as head coach.

== Roster ==
Number	Name	Position	Height	Weight	Year	Hometown
0	Nnamdi Enechionyia	Guard/Forward	6–6	175	Freshman	Hagerstown, Maryland
1	Brandon Roberts	Guard	6–1	165	Freshman	Decatur, Alabama
2	Brandon Hayman	Guard	6–3	190	Junior	Braselton, Georgia
4	Isaiah Williams	Guard	6–1	160	Freshman	Buford, Georgia
5	Russell Wilson	Guard	5–11	170	Sophomore	Lake Wales, Florida
10	Connor Miller	Guard	6–4	170	Junior	Stanley, Wisconsin
11	Raijon Kelly	Guard	6–4	175	Junior	St. Paul, Minnesota
12	Tony Thompson	Guard	5–11	160	Senior	Florissant, Missouri
15	Hamilton Bailey	Guard	6–4	190	Senior	Atlanta
21	Chris Longoria	Guard	6–4	180	Sophomore	Peachtree City, Georgia
23	Jordan Capps	Guard/Forward	6–6	195	Freshman	Suwanee, Georgia
24	Eric Adams	Forward	6–4	185	Freshman	Hoover, Alabama
25	Michael Bradley	Center	6–10	250	Junior	Chattanooga, Tennessee
32	Tim Williams	Forward	6–8	210	Sophomore	Chicago, Illinois
33	Emeka Ikezu	Forward/Center	6–9	230	Freshman	Greensboro, North Carolina
35	Tyler Hood	Forward	6–6	210	Junior	Lenoir City, Tennessee

== Schedule ==
Date time, TV	Opponent	Result	Record	Site (attendance) city, state
Regular season
11/09/2013*; 7:00 pm	Martin Methodist	W 79–62	1–0	Pete Hanna Center (1,059); Homewood, Alabama
11/12/2013*; 7:30 pm	at Texas–Arlington	L 75–88	1–1	College Park Center (1,239); Arlington, Texas
11/15/2013*; 6:00 pm, BTN	at No. 23 Indiana	L 59–105	1–2	Assembly Hall (17,472); Bloomington, Indiana
11/18/2013*; 7:00 pm	at Louisiana–Monroe	L 52–86	1–3	Fant–Ewing Coliseum (1,503); Monroe, Louisiana
11/21/2013*; 6:00 pm	at East Tennessee State	L 75–89	1–4	Freedom Hall Civic Center (2,640); Johnson City, Tennessee
11/23/2013*; 7:00 pm, ESPN3	at WKU	L 64–67	1–5	E. A. Diddle Arena (4,224); Bowling Green, Kentucky
11/26/2013*; 7:00 pm	at Stephen F. Austin	L 78–98	1–6	William R. Johnson Coliseum (857); Nacogdoches, Texas
11/29/2013*; 7:00 pm	Campbellsville	W 79–68	2–6	Pete Hanna Center (525); Homewood, Alabama
12/01/2013*; 2:00 pm	Kentucky State	W 76–73	3–6	Pete Hanna Center (582); Homewood, Alabama
12/04/2013*; 7:00 pm	Tennessee–Martin	L 73–89	3–7	Pete Hanna Center (1,097); Homewood, Alabama
12/07/2013*; 7:00 pm	Austin Peay	W 85–63	4–7	Pete Hanna Center (1,096); Homewood, Alabama
12/14/2013*; 1:00 pm	at Florida Gulf Coast	L 51–83	4–8	Alico Arena (2,785); Fort Myers, Florida
12/20/2013*; 6:00 pm	at Jacksonville	W 75–58	5–8	Jacksonville Veterans Memorial Arena (353); Jacksonville, Florida
12/28/2013*; 1:00 pm	at Maruqette	L 48–71	5–9	Bradley Center (14,668); Milwaukee, Wisconsin
12/30/2013*; 7:00 pm	Presbyterian	W 71–59	6–9	Pete Hanna Center (718); Homewood, Alabama
01/02/2014; 7:00 pm	Wofford	L 61–71	6–10 (0–1)	Pete Hanna Center (995); Homewood, Alabama
01/04/2014; 1:00 pm	at Georgia Southern	L 78–80	6–11 (0–2)	Hanner Fieldhouse (1,018); Statesboro, Georgia
01/09/2014; 6:00 pm	at Chattanooga	L 81–90	6–12 (0–3)	McKenzie Arena (3,097); Chattanooga, Tennessee
01/11/2014; 6:00 pm	Furman	W 57–55	7–12 (1–3)	Pete Hanna Center (1,236); Homewood, Alabama
01/18/2014; 1:00 pm	at Western Carolina	L 64–67	7–13 (1–4)	Ramsey Center (2,146); Cullowhee, North Carolina
01/23/2014; 7:00 pm	UNC Greensboro	W 88–78	8–13 (2–4)	Pete Hanna Center (1,525); Homewood, Alabama
01/25/2014; 6:00 pm	Elon	W 62–59	9–13 (3–4)	Pete Hanna Center (1,418); Homewood, Alabama
02/01/2014; 6:00 pm	at Wofford	L ^{58–77}	9–14 (3–5)	Benjamin Johnson Arena (1,329); Spartanburg, North Carolina
02/03/2014; 6:00 pm	at Furman; Postponed from 1/30	W 76–68	10–14 (4–5)	Timmons Arena (1,004); Greenville, South Carolina
02/06/2014; 7:00 pm	Davidson	L 88–109	10–15 (4–6)	Pete Hanna Center (1,056); Homewood, Alabama
02/08/2014; 6:00 pm	Chattanooga	W 92–85 ^{OT}	11–15 (5–6)	Pete Hanna Center (2,952); Homewood, Alabama
02/13/2014; 6:00 pm	at Appalachian State	L 68–74	11–16 (5–7)	George M. Holmes Convocation Center (474); Boone, North Carolina
02/15/2014; 6:00 pm	at Elon	L 69–86	11–17 (5–8)	Alumni Gym (1,607); Elon, North Carolina
02/24/2014; 6:00 pm, CSS	at The Citadel	L 71–81	11–18 (5–9)	McAlister Field House (1,299); Charleston, South Carolina
02/27/2014; 7:00 pm	Appalachian State	L 57–63	11–19 (5–10)	Pete Hanna Center (2,711); Homewood, Alabama
03/01/2014; 6:00 pm	Western Carolina	W 93–86	12–19 (6–10)	Pete Hanna Center (2,741); Homewood, Alabama
2014 SoCon tournament
03/07/2014; 11:00 am, ESPN3	vs. Appalachian State; First round	W 70–56	13–19	U.S. Cellular Center (3,123); Asheville, North Carolina
03/08/2014; 11:00 am, ESPN3	vs. Davidson; Quarterfinals	L 54–77	13–20	U.S. Cellular Center (5,898); Asheville, North Carolina
*Non-conference game. ^{#}Rankings from AP Poll. (#) Tournament seedings in parentheses. All times are in Central Time.
