= 2013–14 UNC Greensboro Spartans men's basketball team =

American college basketball season

2013–14 UNC Greensboro Spartans men's basketball
- Conference: Southern Conference
- Record: 14–18 (7–9 SoCon)
- Head coach: Wes Miller (3rd season)
- Assistant coaches: Mike Roberts; Jackie Manuel; Duane Simpkins
- Home arena: Greensboro Coliseum

2013–14 Southern Conference men's basketball standings
	Conf.				Overall
Team	W		L	PCT	W		L	PCT
Davidson	15	–	1	.938	20	–	13	.606
Chattanooga	12	–	4	.750	18	–	15	.545
Wofford †	11	–	5	.688	20	–	13	.606
Elon	11	–	5	.688	18	–	14	.563
Western Carolina	10	–	6	.625	19	–	15	.559
UNC Greensboro	7	–	9	.438	14	–	18	.438
Georgia Southern	6	–	10	.375	15	–	19	.441
Samford	6	–	10	.375	13	–	20	.394
Appalachian State	5	–	11	.313	9	–	21	.300
Furman	3	–	13	.188	9	–	21	.300
The Citadel	2	–	14	.125	7	–	26	.212
† 2014 SoCon Tournament winner

The 2013–14 UNC Greensboro Spartans men's basketball team represented the University of North Carolina at Greensboro during the 2013–14 NCAA Division I men's basketball season. The Spartans, led by third-year head coach Wes Miller, played their home games at the Greensboro Coliseum and were members of the Southern Conference. They finished the season 14–18, 7–9 in SoCon play to finish in sixth place. They lost in the first round of the SoCon tournament to The Citadel.

== Roster ==
Number	Name	Position	Height	Weight	Year	Hometown
0	Tevon Saddler	Guard	6–4	207	Freshman	Aberdeen, Maryland
1	Drew Parker	Guard	6–1	178	Senior	Houston, Texas
2	Asad Lamot	Guard	6–1	185	Junior	Mebane, North Carolina
3	Diante Baldwin	Guard	6–0	181	Freshman	Greensboro, North Carolina
11	Clay Byrd	Guard	6–0	176	Freshman	Connelly Springs, North Carolina
12	Allen Baez	Guard	6–2	167	Freshman	Miami, Florida
13	Kayel Locke	Forward	6–5	240	Sophomore	Baltimore, Maryland
14	Kyle Cain	Forward	6–7	210	Junior	Chicago, Illinois
15	Modestas Masilionis	Guard/forward	6–4	191	Junior	Orland Park, Illinois
20	Jordan Potts	Guard	5–11	170	Sophomore	Columbus, Ohio
21	Jordan Robertson	Forward	6–7	232	Junior	Greensboro, North Carolina
31	Nicholas Paulos	Guard/forward	6–7	185	Junior	Salt Lake City
32	Jordy Kuiper	Forward	6–9	238	Freshman	Groningen, Netherlands
33	Tyler McNeely	Forward	6–4	220	Senior	Princeton, New Jersey
34	RJ White	Center	6–8	280	Freshman	Frisco, Texas
35	Jamal Mitchell	Guard/forward	6–4	190	Junior	Charlotte, North Carolina
44	Ty Outlaw	Guard/forward	6–6	205	Freshman	Roxboro, North Carolina

== Schedule ==
Date time, TV	Opponent	Result	Record	Site (attendance) city, state
Exhibition
11/02/2013*; 2:00 pm	Lees–McRae	W 104–76		Fleming Gymnasium (1,013); Greensboro, North Carolina
Regular season
11/08/2013*; 7:00 pm	High Point	W 82–74	1–0	Greensboro Coliseum (5,734); Greensboro, North Carolina
11/12/2013*; 7:00 pm	East Carolina	L 84–85	1–1	Greensboro Coliseum (3,217); Greensboro, North Carolina
11/17/2013*; 2:00 pm	Chowan	W 97–58	2–1	Greensboro Coliseum (1,862); Greensboro, North Carolina
11/20/2013*; 7:00 pm	Greensboro College; Gulf Coast Showcase	W 92–62	3–1	Greensboro Coliseum (2,154); Greensboro, North Carolina
11/25/2013*; 12:00 pm	vs. Louisiana Tech; Gulf Coast Showcase	L 62–99	3–2	Germain Arena (233); Estero, Florida
11/26/2013*; 12:00 pm	vs. San Diego; Gulf Coast Showcase	L 71–83	3–3	Germain Arena (N/A); Estero, Florida
11/27/2013*; 12:00 pm	vs. Stetson; Gulf Coast Showcase	W 75–68	4–3	Germain Arena (N/A); Estero, Florida
12/03/2013*; 7:00 pm	Presbyterian	L 66–87	4–4	Greensboro Coliseum (1,938); Greensboro, North Carolina
12/07/2013*; 7:00 pm, ESPNU	at North Carolina	L 50–81	4–5	Dean Smith Center (15,676); Chapel Hill, North Carolina
12/11/2013*; 12:00 pm	Claflin	W 75–70	5–5	Greensboro Coliseum (5,424); Greensboro, North Carolina
12/14/2013*; 4:00 pm	at Rutgers	L 72–89	5–6	The RAC (4,122); Piscataway, New Jersey
12/18/2013*; 7:00 pm	James Madison	W 78–65	6–6	Greensboro Coliseum (1,626); Greensboro, North Carolina
12/21/2013*; 2:00 pm	at Wake Forest	L 51–59	6–7	LJVM Coliseum (8,467); Winston-Salem, North Carolina
12/28/2013*; 12:00 pm	at Virginia Tech	W 55–52	7–7	Cassell Coliseum (4,847); Blacksburg, Virginia
12/30/2013*; 7:00 pm, ESPN3	NC State	L 64–68	7–8	Greensboro Coliseum (5,989); Greensboro, North Carolina
01/02/2014; 7:00 pm	at Western Carolina	L 51–72	7–9 (0–1)	Ramsey Center (894); Cullowhee, North Carolina
01/06/2014; 7:00 pm	Furman	W 90–82	8–9 (1–1)	Greensboro Coliseum (1,720); Greensboro, North Carolina
01/09/2014; 7:00 pm, ESPN3	at Appalachian State	W 66–60	9–9 (2–1)	George M. Holmes Convocation Center (702); Boone, North Carolina
01/16/2014; 7:00 pm	The Citadel	W 69–65 ^{OT}	10–9 (3–1)	Greensboro Coliseum (2,139); Greensboro, North Carolina
01/18/2014; 5:00 pm	Davidson	L 82–93	10–10 (3–2)	Greensboro Coliseum (2,740); Greensboro, North Carolina
01/23/2014; 7:00 pm, ESPN3	at Samford	L 78–88	10–11 (3–3)	Pete Hanna Center (1,525); Homewood, Alabama
01/25/2014; 7:00 pm, ESPN3	at Chattanooga	L 67–77	10–12 (3–4)	McKenzie Arena (6,648); Chattanooga, Tennessee
01/30/2014; 7:00 pm	Appalachian State	W 66–61	11–12 (4–4)	Greensboro Coliseum (3,230); Greensboro, North Carolina
02/01/2014; 5:00 pm	Georgia Southern	L 62–64	11–13 (4–5)	Greensboro Coliseum (4,485); Greensboro, North Carolina
02/06/2014; 7:00 pm	at Elon	L 66–72	11–14 (4–6)	Alumni Gym (1,361); Elon, North Carolina
02/13/2014; 2:00 pm	at Georgia Southern	W 68–56	12–14 (5–6)	Hanner Fieldhouse (1,543); Statesboro, Georgia
02/16/2014; 2:00 pm	Western Carolina	L 77–82 ^{OT}	12–15 (5–7)	Greensboro Coliseum (2,466); Greensboro, North Carolina
02/19/2014; 7:00 pm	Elon	L 68–81	12–16 (5–8)	Greensboro Coliseum (2,385); Greensboro, North Carolina
02/23/2014; 2:00 pm	Chattanooga	W 88–84	13–16 (6–8)	Greensboro Coliseum (2,237); Greensboro, North Carolina
02/27/2014; 7:00 pm	at Davidson	L 46–79	13–17 (6–9)	John M. Belk Arena (3,309); Davidson, North Carolina
03/01/2014; 7:00 pm	at Wofford	W 73–71	14–17 (7–9)	Benjamin Johnson Arena (1,797); Spartanburg, South Carolina
2014 SoCon tournament
03/07/2014; 4:00 pm, ESPN3	vs. The Citadel; First round	L 76–86	14–18	U.S. Cellular Center (3,123); Asheville, North Carolina
*Non-conference game. ^{#}Rankings from AP Poll. (#) Tournament seedings in parentheses. All times are in Eastern Time.
