= 2013–14 Chattanooga Mocs basketball team =

American college basketball season

2013–14 Chattanooga Mocs men's basketball

CIT, First round
- Conference: Southern Conference
- Record: 18–15 (12–4 SoCon)
- Head coach: Will Wade (1st season)
- Assistant coaches: Turner Battle; Casey Long; Wes Long
- Home arena: McKenzie Arena

2013–14 Southern Conference men's basketball standings
	Conf.				Overall
Team	W		L	PCT	W		L	PCT
Davidson	15	–	1	.938	20	–	13	.606
Chattanooga	12	–	4	.750	18	–	15	.545
Wofford †	11	–	5	.688	20	–	13	.606
Elon	11	–	5	.688	18	–	14	.563
Western Carolina	10	–	6	.625	19	–	15	.559
UNC Greensboro	7	–	9	.438	14	–	18	.438
Georgia Southern	6	–	10	.375	15	–	19	.441
Samford	6	–	10	.375	13	–	20	.394
Appalachian State	5	–	11	.313	9	–	21	.300
Furman	3	–	13	.188	9	–	21	.300
The Citadel	2	–	14	.125	7	–	26	.212
† 2014 SoCon Tournament winner

The 2013–14 Chattanooga Mocs basketball team represented the University of Tennessee at Chattanooga during the 2013–14 NCAA Division I men's basketball season. The Mocs, led by first year head coach Will Wade, played their home games at the McKenzie Arena and were members of the Southern Conference. They finished the season 18–15, 12–4 in SoCon play to finish in second place. They lost in the quarterfinals of the Southern Conference tournament to Georgia Southern. They were invited to the CollegeInsider.com Tournament where they lost in the first round to East Tennessee State.

== Roster ==
Number	Name	Position	Height	Weight	Year	Hometown
1	Greg Pryor	Guard	6–1	195	Freshman	Memphis, Tennessee
2	Anthanee Doyle	Guard	6–1	180	Freshman	Holly Springs, North Carolina
3	Lance Stokes	Forward	6–7	225	Junior	Orlando, Florida
10	Martynas Bareika	Guard	6–5	215	Junior	Kėdainiai, Lithuania
11	Ronrico White	Guard	6–3	170	Junior	Knoxville, Tennessee
12	Gee McGhee	Guard	6–4	205	Sophomore	Baton Rouge, Louisiana
14	Alex Bran	Guard	6–1	180	Sophomore	Memphis, Tennessee
15	Eric Robertson	Guard	6–4	200	Sophomore	Huntsville, Alabama
22	Tre McLean	Forward	6–0	195	Sophomore	Charleston, South Carolina
23	Andrew Houts	Guard	5–11	180	Junior	Trenton, Georgia
24	Casey Jones	Guard	6–5	200	Sophomore	New Orleans, Louisiana
25	Jay Wimbley	Guard	6–2	190	Freshman	Winter Park, Florida
30	Z. Mason	Forward	6–5	235	Senior	Nashville, Tennessee
31	Justin Tuoyo	Forward	6–10	220	Sophomore	Fayetteville, Georgia
44	T.J. Williams	Forward	6–8	240	Freshman	Wilmington, North Carolina

== Schedule ==
Date time, TV	Opponent	Result	Record	Site (attendance) city, state
Regular season
11/08/2013*; 5:30 pm	Covenant	W 119–56	1–0	McKenzie Arena (4,637); Chattanooga, TN
11/11/2013*; 7:00 pm	at Radford	L 78–89	1–1	Dedmon Center (2,011); Radford, VA
11/16/2013*; 7:00 pm	Montreat	W 108–51	2–1	McKenzie Arena (2,989); Chattanooga, TN
11/19/2013*; 7:00 pm	Kennesaw State	L 69–73	2–2	McKenzie Arena (3,028); Chattanooga, TN
11/22/2013*; 10:00 pm	at Nevada; Las Vegas Invitational	L 81–83	2–3	Lawlor Events Center (5,883); Reno, NV
11/24/2013*; 10:00 pm, P12N	at No. 22 UCLA; Las Vegas Invitational	L 65–106	2–4	Pauley Pavilion (5,739); Los Angeles, CA
11/28/2013*; 5:00 pm	vs. Morehead State; Las Vegas Invitational	L 75–88	2–5	Orleans Arena (N/A); Paradise, NV
11/29/2013*; 3:30 pm	vs. IUPUI; Las Vegas Invitational	W 87–76	3–5	Orleans Arena (N/A); Paradise, NV
12/02/2013*; 7:30 pm, ESPN3/CSS	at Georgia	L 56–87	3–6	Stegeman Coliseum (4,226); Athens, GA
12/10/2013*; 7:00 pm	Hiwassee	W 86–68	4–6	McKenzie Arena (2,503); Chattanooga, TN
12/15/2013*; 12:00 pm	at Northern Kentucky	L 71–87	4–7	The Bank of Kentucky Center (947); Highland Heights, KY
12/18/2013*; 8:00 pm	at UAB	L 52–67	4–8	Bartow Arena (3,009); Birmingham, AL
12/29/2013*; 7:00 pm	Grand Canyon; Dr. Pepper Classic	W 69–64	5–8	McKenzie Arena (3,248); Chattanooga, TN
12/30/2013*; 7:00 pm	Maine; Dr. Pepper Classic	W 86–80	6–8	McKenzie Arena (2,921); Chattanooga, TN
01/04/2014; 4:00 pm, ESPN3	at Furman	W 72–63	7–8 (1–0)	Timmons Arena (1,020); Greenville, SC
01/06/2014; 7:00 pm, CSS/ESPN3	at The Citadel	W 82–78	8–8 (2–0)	McAlister Field House (723); Charleston, SC
01/09/2014; 7:00 pm	Samford	W 90–81	9–8 (3–0)	McKenzie Arena (3,097); Chattanooga, TN
01/11/2014; 7:00 pm	Wofford	W 70–69	10–8 (4–0)	McKenzie Arena (3,866); Chattanooga, TN
01/16/2014; 7:00 pm	at Appalachian State	W 80–70	11–8 (5–0)	George M. Holmes Convocation Center (1,093); Boone, NC
01/18/2014; 7:00 pm	at Wofford	W 71–57	12–8 (6–0)	Benjamin Johnson Arena (1,387); Spartanburg, NC
01/23/2014; 7:00 pm	Elon	W 84–63	13–8 (7–0)	McKenzie Arena (4,662); Chattanooga, TN
01/25/2014; 7:00 pm, ESPN3	UNC Greensboro	W 77–67	14–8 (8–0)	McKenzie Arena (6,648); Chattanooga, TN
01/30/2014; 7:00 pm	at Davidson	L 51–94	14–9 (8–1)	Benjamin Johnson Arena (3,343); Spartanburg, NC
02/01/2014; 7:00 pm	Furman	W 67–52	15–9 (9–1)	McKenzie Arena (5,023); Chattanooga, TN
02/04/2014*; 7:00 pm	at Eastern Kentucky	L 63–74	15–10	McBrayer Arena (1,300); Richmond, KY
02/08/2014; 7:00 pm	at Samford	L 85–92 ^{OT}	15–11 (9–2)	Pete Hanna Center (2,952); Homewood, AL
02/14/2014; 7:00 pm	Western Carolina	W 83–73	16–11 (10–2)	McKenzie Arena (3,209); Chattanooga, TN
02/20/2014; 7:00 pm	Georgia Southern	L 61–77	16–12 (10–3)	McKenzie Arena (3,743); Chattanooga, TN
02/23/2014; 2:00 pm	at UNC Greensboro	L 84–88	16–13 (10–4)	Greensboro Coliseum (2,237); Greensboro, NC
02/27/2014; 7:00 pm	at Western Carolina	W 83–81 ^{OT}	17–13 (11–4)	Ramsey Center (1,638); Cullowhee, NC
03/01/2014; 7:00 pm	Appalachian State	W 63–44	18–13 (12–4)	McKenzie Arena (4,953); Chattanooga, TN
SoCon tournament
03/08/2014; 6:00 pm, ESPN3	vs. Georgia Southern; Quarterfinals	L 55–62	18–14	U.S. Cellular Center (3,811); Asheville, NC
CIT
3/18/2014*; 7:00 pm	at East Tennessee State; First round	L 66–79	18–15	ETSU/MSHA Athletic Center (3,045); Johnson City, TN
*Non-conference game. ^{#}Rankings from AP Poll. (#) Tournament seedings in parentheses. All times are in Eastern Time.
