= 2013–14 Appalachian State Mountaineers men's basketball team =

American college basketball season

2013–14 Appalachian State Mountaineers men's basketball
- Conference: Southern Conference
- Record: 9–21 (5–11 SoCon)
- Head coach: Jason Capel (4th season)
- Assistant coaches: Bobby Kummer; Justin Gainey; Kellen Sampson
- Home arena: George M. Holmes Convocation Center

2013–14 Southern Conference men's basketball standings
	Conf.				Overall
Team	W		L	PCT	W		L	PCT
Davidson	15	–	1	.938	20	–	13	.606
Chattanooga	12	–	4	.750	18	–	15	.545
Wofford †	11	–	5	.688	20	–	13	.606
Elon	11	–	5	.688	18	–	14	.563
Western Carolina	10	–	6	.625	19	–	15	.559
UNC Greensboro	7	–	9	.438	14	–	18	.438
Georgia Southern	6	–	10	.375	15	–	19	.441
Samford	6	–	10	.375	13	–	20	.394
Appalachian State	5	–	11	.313	9	–	21	.300
Furman	3	–	13	.188	9	–	21	.300
The Citadel	2	–	14	.125	7	–	26	.212
† 2014 SoCon Tournament winner

The 2013–14 Appalachian State Mountaineers men's basketball team represented Appalachian State University during the 2013–14 NCAA Division I men's basketball season. The Mountaineers, led by fourth year head coach Jason Capel, played their home games at the George M. Holmes Convocation Center and were members of the Southern Conference. They finished the season 9–21, 5–11 in SoCon play to finish in ninth place.

They lost in the first round of the SoCon tournament to Samford.

At the end of the season, head coach Jason Capel was fired after a four-year record of 53–70.

This was the Mountaineers' last season as a member of the SoCon, as they joined the Sun Belt Conference in July 2014.

== Roster ==
Number	Name	Position	Height	Weight	Year	Hometown
0	Mike Kobani	Forward	6–8	250	Freshman	Bida, Nigeria
1	Tevin Baskin	Forward	6–6	210	Senior	Stamford, Connecticut
2	Tab Hamilton	Guard	6–3	180	Junior	Winston-Salem, North Carolina
3	Dustin Clarke	Guard	6–3	165	Sophomore	Greensboro, North Carolina
4	Michael Obacha	Forward	6–8	215	Sophomore	Edo State, Nigeria
10	Chris Burgess	Guard	5–8	175	Sophomore	Lakeland, Florida
12	Rantavious Gilbert	Forward	6–8	235	Sophomore	Albany, Georgia
15	Tommy Spagnolo	Forward	6–7	210	Senior	West Jefferson, North Carolina
21	Frank Eaves	Guard	6–2	175	Sophomore	Greensboro, North Carolina
23	Mike Neal	Guard	6–2	185	Junior	Greensboro, North Carolina
25	Aaron Scott	Guard	6–4	180	Freshman	Columbia, South Carolina
32	Ty Toney	Guard	6–2	185	Freshman	Alpharetta, Georgia
34	Jacob Lawson	Guard	6–8	217	Junior	Reidsville, North Carolina
35	Jay Canty	Forward	6–6	200	Sophomore	Jamestown, North Carolina

== Schedule ==
Date time, TV	Opponent	Result	Record	Site (attendance) city, state
Regular season
11/08/2013*; 7:00 pm, ESPN3	at NC State; Global Sports Hoops Showcase	L 77–98	0–1	PNC Arena (13,164); Raleigh, North Carolina
11/12/2013*; 7:00 pm	Campbell; Global Sports Hoops Showcase	L 66–73	0–2	Holmes Center (1,482); Boone, North Carolina
11/16/2013*; 2:00 pm, ESPN3	at Cincinnati; Global Sports Hoops Showcase	L 49–77	0–3	Fifth Third Arena (6,194); Cincinnati
11/19/2013*; 7:00 pm	Lees-McRae	W 91–63	1–3	Holmes Center (1,016); Boone, North Carolina
11/22/2013*; 7:00 pm	at NC Central; Global Sports Hoops Showcase	L 70–76	1–4	McLendon–McDougald Gymnasium (2,482); Durham, North Carolina
11/29/2013*; 5:00 pm	at Georgia	L 53–71	1–5	Stegeman Coliseum (4,857); Athens, Georgia
12/4/2013*; 7:00 pm	North Greenville	W 78–70	2–5	Holmes Center (672); Boone, North Carolina
12/8/2013*; 7:00 pm, WCCB	Charlotte	L 59–77	2–6	Holmes Center (1,354); Boone, North Carolina
12/15/2013*; 2:00 pm	at Winthrop	L 72–80	2–7	Winthrop Coliseum (1,153); Rock Hill, South Carolina
12/18/2013*; 7:00 pm	at Presbyterian	L 69–74	2–8	Templeton Center (212); Clinton, South Carolina
12/21/2013*; 2:00 pm	Milligan	W 100–68	3–8	Holmes Center (517); Boone, North Carolina
12/30/2013*; 7:00 pm	Bluefield	W 97–70	4–8	Holmes Center (688); Boone, North Carolina
1/2/2014*; 7:00 pm	at Duquesne	L 55–79	4–9	Palumbo Center (1,892); Pittsburgh
1/6/2014; 7:00 pm	at Elon	L 66–75	4–10 (0–1)	Alumni Gym (1,215); Elon, North Carolina
1/9/2014; 7:00 pm	UNC Greensboro	L 60–66	4–11 (0–2)	Holmes Center (702); Boone, North Carolina
1/11/2014; 7:00 pm	at Davidson	L 66–78	4–12 (0–3)	John M. Belk Arena (3,989); Davidson, North Carolina
1/16/2014; 7:00 pm	Chattanooga	L 70–80	4–13 (0–4)	Holmes Center (1,093); Boone, North Carolina
1/18/2014; 2:00 pm	Georgia Southern	W 81–68	5–13 (1–4)	Holmes Center (1,249); Boone, North Carolina
1/23/2014; 7:00 pm	at The Citadel	W 80–67	6–13 (2–4)	McAlister Field House (1,322); Charleston, South Carolina
1/30/2014; 7:00 pm	at UNC Greensboro	L 61–66	6–14 (2–5)	Greensboro Coliseum (3,230); Greensboro, North Carolina
2/1/2014; 2:00 pm	Elon	L 76–83	6–15 (2–6)	Holmes Center (2,004); Boone, North Carolina
2/6/2014; 7:00 pm	The Citadel	W 54–45	7–15 (3–6)	Holmes Center (820); Boone, North Carolina
2/8/2014; 2:00 pm	at Western Carolina	L 75–84 ^{OT}	7–16 (3–7)	Ramsey Center (3,712); Collowhee, North Carolina
2/13/2014; 7:00 pm	Samford	W 74–68	8–16 (4–7)	Holmes Center (474); Boone, North Carolina
2/15/2014; 4:30 pm	Wofford	L 58–64	8–17 (4–8)	Holmes Center (1,703); Boone, North Carolina
2/20/2014; 7:00 pm	Western Carolina	L 61–74	8–18 (4–9)	Holmes Center (2,041); Boone, North Carolina
2/22/2014; 2:00 pm	at Furman	L 53–68	8–19 (4–10)	Timmons Arena (1,362); Greenville, South Carolina
2/27/2014; 8:00 pm	at Samford	W 63–57	9–19 (5–10)	Pete Hanna Center (2,711); Homewood, Alabama
3/1/2014; 7:00 pm	at Chattanooga	L 44–63	9–20 (5–11)	McKenzie Arena (4,953); Chattanooga, Tennessee
2014 SoCon tournament
03/07/2014; 11:00 am, ESPN3	vs. Samford; First round	L 56–70	9–21	U.S. Cellular Center (3,123); Asheville, North Carolina
*Non-conference game. ^{#}Rankings from AP Poll. (#) Tournament seedings in parentheses. All times are in Eastern Time.
