= 2013–14 Wofford Terriers men's basketball team =

American college basketball season

2013–14 Wofford Terriers men's basketball

SoCon tournament champions

NCAA tournament, round of 64
- Conference: Southern Conference
- Record: 20–13 (11–5 SoCon)
- Head coach: Mike Young (12th season)
- Associate head coach: Dustin Kerns (1st season)
- Assistant coaches: Tim Johnson; Darris Nichols
- Home arena: Benjamin Johnson Arena

2013–14 Southern Conference men's basketball standings
	Conf.				Overall
Team	W		L	PCT	W		L	PCT
Davidson	15	–	1	.938	20	–	13	.606
Chattanooga	12	–	4	.750	18	–	15	.545
Wofford †	11	–	5	.688	20	–	13	.606
Elon	11	–	5	.688	18	–	14	.563
Western Carolina	10	–	6	.625	19	–	15	.559
UNC Greensboro	7	–	9	.438	14	–	18	.438
Georgia Southern	6	–	10	.375	15	–	19	.441
Samford	6	–	10	.375	13	–	20	.394
Appalachian State	5	–	11	.313	9	–	21	.300
Furman	3	–	13	.188	9	–	21	.300
The Citadel	2	–	14	.125	7	–	26	.212
† 2014 SoCon Tournament winner

The 2013–14 Wofford Terriers men's basketball team represented Wofford College during the 2013–14 NCAA Division I men's basketball season. The Terriers, led by 12th year head coach Mike Young, played their home games at the Benjamin Johnson Arena and were members of the Southern Conference. They finished the season 20–13, 11–5 in SoCon ply to finish in a tie for third place. They were champions of the SoCon tournament to earn an automatic bid to the NCAA tournament where they lost in the second round to Michigan.

== Roster ==
Number	Name	Position	Height	Weight	Year	Hometown
2	Karl Cochran	Guard	6–1	175	Junior	Marietta, Georgia
3	John Swinton	Guard	6–2	185	Junior	Mt. Pleasant, South Carolina
4	Zach Korkowski	Forward	6–6	205	Sophomore	Williamsburg, Virginia
5	Eric Garcia	Guard	5–11	170	Freshman	Aurora, Colorado
11	Indiana Faithfull	Guard	6–4	200	Junior	Sydney, Australia
12	Jeremiah Tate	Guard	6–1	180	Freshman	Columbia, South Carolina
14	Aerris Smith	Forward	6–8	240	Senior	Charlotte, North Carolina
20	Jaylen Allen	Guard	6–3	180	Freshman	Johnson City, Tennessee
22	Zac Grossenbacher	Forward	6–8	220	Sophomore	Parkersburg, West Virginia
24	Justin Gordon	Forward	6–6	205	Sophomore	Charlotte, North Carolina
31	C.J. Neumann	Forward	6–7	230	Sophomore	St. Paul, Minnesota
32	Spencer Collins	Guard	6–4	195	Sophomore	Easley, South Carolina
34	Lee Skinner	Forward	6–6	220	Junior	Lombard, Illinois
40	Eric Wagenlander	Guard	6–2	180	Freshman	Mount Pleasant, North Carolina

== Schedule ==
Date time, TV	Rank^{#}	Opponent^{#}	Result	Record	Site (attendance) city, state
Regular season
11/08/2013*; 7:30 pm		at Georgia	L 52–72	0–1	Stegeman Coliseum (5,592); Athens, Georgia
11/11/2013*; 7:00 pm		Emory & Henry	W 83–58	1–1	Benjamin Johnson Arena (N/A); Spartanburg, South Carolina
11/16/2013*; 2:00 pm		at Iona	L 55–76	1–2	Hynes Athletic Center (2,046); New Rochelle, New York
11/21/2013*; 7:00 pm, BTN		at Minnesota	L 57–79	1–3	Williams Arena (10,342); Minneapolis
11/24/2013*; 5:00 pm		at High Point	L 56–66	1–4	Millis Center (1,202); High Point, North Carolina
11/30/2013*; 2:00 pm		Johnson & Wales	W 90–48	2–4	Benjamin Johnson Arena (607); Spartanburg, South Carolina
12/04/2013*; 7:00 pm		at Gardner–Webb	W 65–62	3–4	Paul Porter Arena (1,410); Boiling Springs, North Carolina
12/07/2013*; 2:00 pm		William & Mary	L 60–63	3–5	Benjamin Johnson Arena (1,012); Spartanburg, South Carolina
12/14/2013*; 8:00 pm		at Saint Louis	L 52–66	3–6	Chaifetz Arena (6,404); St. Louis, Missouri
12/17/2013*; 7:00 pm		at VCU	L 57–72	3–7	Stuart C. Siegel Center (7,741); Richmond, Virginia
12/21/2013*; 2:00 pm		at Winthrop	W 62–56	4–7	Winthrop Coliseum (944); Rock Hill, South Carolina
12/30/2013*; 7:00 pm		High Point	W 81–53	5–7	Benjamin Johnson Arena (879); Spartanburg, South Carolina
01/02/2014; 8:00 pm		at Samford	W 71–61	6–7 (1–0)	Pete Hanna Center (995); Homewood, Alabama
01/04/2014; 7:00 pm		Davidson	L 63–78	6–8 (1–1)	Benjamin Johnson Arena (1,590); Spartanburg, South Carolina
01/09/2014; 9:00 pm		The Citadel	W 79–75 ^{OT}	7–8 (2–1)	Benjamin Johnson Arena (1,217); Spartanburg, South Carolina
01/11/2014; 7:00 pm		at Chattanooga	L 69–70	7–9 (2–2)	McKenzie Arena (3,866); Chattanooga, Tennessee
01/18/2014; 7:00 pm		Chattanooga	L 57–71	7–10 (2–3)	Benjamin Johnson Arena (1,387); Spartanburg, South Carolina
01/20/2014; 2:00 pm		Western Carolina	W 71–60	8–10 (3–3)	Benjamin Johnson Arena (1,397); Spartanburg, South Carolina
01/23/2014; 7:00 pm		at Georgia Southern	W 74–64	9–10 (4–3)	Hanner Fieldhouse (2,030); Statesboro, Georgia
01/25/2013; 2:00 pm		at Furman	W 76–52	10–10 (5–3)	Timmons Arena (1,812); Greenville, South Carolina
02/01/2014; 7:00 pm		Samford	W 77–58	11–10 (6–3)	Benjamin Johnson Arena (1,329); Spartanburg, South Carolina
02/06/2014; 7:00 pm		Georgia Southern	W 74–61	12–10 (7–3)	Benjamin Johnson Arena (1,446); Spartanburg, South Carolina
02/08/2013; 7:05 pm		at The Citadel	W 77–56	13–10 (8–3)	McAlister Field House (1,333); Charleston, South Carolina
02/11/2014*; 7:00 pm		Hiwassee	W 95–60	14–10	Benjamin Johnson Arena (679); Spartanburg, South Carolina
02/15/2014; 4:30 pm		at Appalachian State	W 64–58	15–10 (9–3)	George M. Holmes Convocation Center (1,703); Boone, North Carolina
02/20/2014; 7:00 pm		Furman	W 70–50	16–10 (10–3)	Benjamin Johnson Arena (1,712); Spartanburg, South Carolina
02/22/2014; 7:00 pm		at Davidson	L 49–59	16–11 (10–4)	Belk Arena (4,095); Davidson, North Carolina
02/27/2014; 2:00 pm		at Elon	W 63–59	17–11 (11–4)	Alumni Gym (1,451); Elon, North Carolina
03/01/2014; 7:00 pm		UNC Greensboro	L 71–73	17–12 (11–5)	Benjamin Johnson Arena (1,797); Spartanburg, South Carolina
SoCon tournament
03/08/2014; 8:30 pm, ESPN3		vs. The Citadel; Quarterfinals	W 68–51	18–12	U.S. Cellular Center (3,811); Asheville, North Carolina
03/09/2014; 9:00 pm, ESPN3		vs. Georgia Southern; Semifinals	W 71–57	19–12	U.S. Cellular Center (5,434); Asheville, North Carolina
03/10/2014; 9:00 pm, ESPN2		vs. Western Carolina; Finals	W 56–53	20–12	U.S. Cellular Center (5,799); Asheville, North Carolina
NCAA tournament
03/20/2014; 7:10 pm, CBS	No. (15 MW)	vs. No. 7 (2 MW) Michigan; Second round	L 40–57	20–13	BMO Harris Bradley Center (17,331); Milwaukee
*Non-conference game. ^{#}Rankings from AP Poll, (#) during NCAA Tournament is seed within region MW=Midwest. (#) Tournament seedings in parentheses. All times are in Eastern Time.
