= Bennie Seltzer =

American college basketball coach (born 1971)

Current position
- Title: Assistant coach
- Team: Texas State
- Conference: Sun Belt

Biographical details
- Born: January 20, 1971 (age 55); Birmingham, Alabama, U.S.

Playing career
- 1989–1993: Washington State
- Position: Guard

Coaching career (HC unless noted)
- 1997–2006: Oklahoma (asst.)
- 2006–2008: Marquette (asst.)
- 2008–2012: Indiana (asst.)
- 2012–2014: Samford
- 2015–2017: Loyola (Chicago) (asst.)
- 2017–2019: Washington State (asst.)
- 2019–2020: Evansville (asst.)
- 2019–2020: Evansville (interim HC)
- 2020–present: Texas State (asst.)

Administrative career (AD unless noted)
- 2014–2015: Indiana (dir. player performance)

Head coaching record
- Overall: 24–47 (.338)

Accomplishments and honors

Awards
- First-team All-Pac-10 (1993)

Bennie Seltzer (born January 20, 1971) is an American college basketball coach who most recently served as the interim head coach of the Evansville Purple Aces team following the firing of Walter McCarty. Seltzer is the former head coach of the Samford Bulldogs, a position to which he was hired on April 5, 2012. Previously, he was hired in April 2008 by new Indiana Hoosiers head coach Tom Crean, who brought him and fellow assistant Tim Buckley over from his staff at Marquette. Following his dismissal from Samford, Seltzer was hired by Crean to be Indiana's Director of Player Performance.

== Career ==
Seltzer was the former assistant coach at the University of Oklahoma from 1997 to 2006 under head coach Kelvin Sampson. Sampson also coached Seltzer during his playing days at Washington State. The Sooners went to the NCAA tournament eight times in Seltzer's nine seasons on the staff. Seltzer then moved on to Marquette as an assistant under Tom Crean. Seltzer joined Crean and Buckley on the Indiana staff in April 2008, after Crean was hired to replace the fired Kelvin Sampson.

While his first 3 seasons in Bloomington were a major rebuilding project, the 2011-12 Hoosiers finished 5th in the Big Ten Conference and made a run to the Sweet Sixteen. On April 4, 2012, Seltzer was hired to replace Jimmy Tillette as the head men's basketball coach at Samford University. The move marked a return home for Seltzer, who is native to Birmingham.

In addition to his college coaching jobs, Seltzer was selected as one of four coaches for the USA Basketball national team trials in July 2004. He worked with players that were trying out for the final roster, a team that would go on to win the gold medal.

Seltzer had an outstanding playing career at Washington State. He earned Pac-10 All-Freshman honors in 1990, first-team All-Pac-10 as a senior in 1993 and still holds the All-Time record for career assists in the conference (473). He then went on to spend four seasons playing professionally in Turkey, Venezuela, Poland and the Netherlands.

== Head coaching record ==
Record table
Season	Team	Overall	Conference	Standing	Postseason
Samford Bulldogs (Southern Conference) (2012–2014)
2012–13	Samford	11–21	9–9	T–3rd (North)	
2013–14	Samford	13–20	6–10	T–7th	
Samford:		24–41 (.369)	15–19 (.441)		
Evansville Purple Aces (Missouri Valley Conference) (2019–2020)
2019–20	Evansville	0–6	0–6	10th	
Evansville:		0–6 (.000)	0–6 (.000)		
Total:		24–47 (.338)			

== Personal life ==
Seltzer graduated from A.H. Parker High School (Birmingham, Alabama) in 1989 and went on to earn his B.A. in sociology from Washington State University. He is married to DicQues and has two sons, Diamond and Bennie III.
