= 2013–14 Western Carolina Catamounts men's basketball team =

American college basketball season

2013–14 Western Carolina Catamounts men's basketball
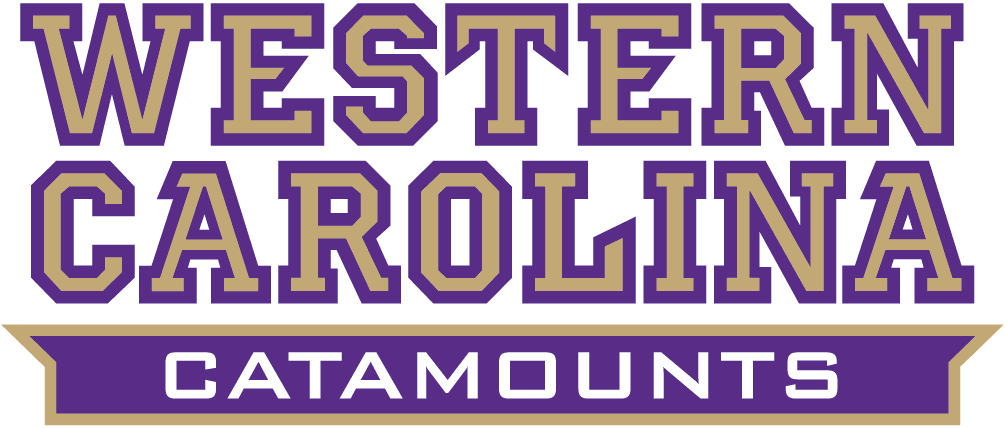
- Conference: Southern Conference
- Record: 19–15 (10–6 SoCon)
- Head coach: Larry Hunter (9th season)
- Assistant coaches: Anquell McCollum; Eric Wilson; Brigham Waginger
- Home arena: Ramsey Center

2013–14 Southern Conference men's basketball standings
	Conf.				Overall
Team	W		L	PCT	W		L	PCT
Davidson	15	–	1	.938	20	–	13	.606
Chattanooga	12	–	4	.750	18	–	15	.545
Wofford †	11	–	5	.688	20	–	13	.606
Elon	11	–	5	.688	18	–	14	.563
Western Carolina	10	–	6	.625	19	–	15	.559
UNC Greensboro	7	–	9	.438	14	–	18	.438
Georgia Southern	6	–	10	.375	15	–	19	.441
Samford	6	–	10	.375	13	–	20	.394
Appalachian State	5	–	11	.313	9	–	21	.300
Furman	3	–	13	.188	9	–	21	.300
The Citadel	2	–	14	.125	7	–	26	.212
† 2014 SoCon Tournament winner

The 2013–14 Western Carolina Catamounts men's basketball team represented Western Carolina University during the 2013–14 NCAA Division I men's basketball season. The Catamounts, led by ninth year head coach Larry Hunter, played their home games at the Ramsey Center and were members of the Southern Conference. They finished the season 19–15, 10–6 in SoCon play to finish in fifth place. They advanced to the championship game of the SoCon tournament where they lost to Wofford.

== Roster ==
Number	Name	Position	Height	Weight	Year	Hometown
0	Tom Tankelewicz	Forward	6–4	180	Senior	Apex, North Carolina
1	Kenneth Hall	Forward	6–7	210	Junior	Dallas
2	Mike Brown	Guard	6–3	175	Sophomore	Charlotte, North Carolina
3	Rhett Harrelson	Guard	5–10	170	Sophomore	Enterprise, Alabama
4	Torrion Brummitt	Forward	6–7	240	Sophomore	Columbus, Georgia
5	Trey Sumler	Guard	6–2	175	Senior	Rocky Mount, North Carolina
14	Josh Mendenhall	Forward	6–8	180	Senior	Greenville, South Carolina
21	Ethan Freeman	Guard	6–1	175	Sophomore	Marion, North Carolina
23	Justin Browning	Forward	6–4	175	Sophomore	Sylacauga, Alabama
24	Brandon Boggs	Guard	6–5	190	Senior	Greenville, South Carolina
25	James Sinclair	Guard	6–3	180	Junior	Savannah, Georgia
32	Tawaski King	Forward	6–8	245	Senior	Dublin, Georgia
41	Charlendez Brooks	Forward	6–9	270	Freshman	Duncan, South Carolina

== Schedule ==
Date time, TV	Opponent	Result	Record	Site (attendance) city, state
Regular season
11/08/2013*; 7:00 pm	Wittenberg	W 77–55	1–0	Ramsey Center (1,582); Cullowhee, North Carolina
11/11/2013*; 7:00 pm	UNC Asheville	W 74–67	2–0	Ramsey Center (1,957); Cullowhee, North Carolina
11/13/2013*; 11:00 pm, Pac-12 Network	at No. 18 Oregon	L 83–107	2–1	Matthew Knight Arena (6,262); Eugene, Oregon
11/15/2013*; 7:00 pm, ESPN3	at Virginia Tech; Coaches vs. Cancer Classic	L 61–79	2–2	Cassell Coliseum (5,617); Blacksburg, Virginia
11/16/2013*; 7:30 pm	at Liberty	W 68–63	3–2	Vines Center (2,596); Lynchburg, Virginia
11/21/2013*; 7:30 pm	at Kent State; Coaches vs. Cancer Classic	L 59–73	3–3	MAC Center (2,473); Kent, Ohio
11/22/2013*; 5:00 pm	vs. Niagara; Coaches vs. Cancer Classic	W 98–90	4–3	MAC Center (579); Kent, Ohio
11/23/2013*; 5:00 pm	vs. USC Upstate; Coaches vs. Cancer Classic	L 58–72	4–4	MAC Center (316); Kent, Ohio
11/26/2013*; 7:00 pm	Limestone College	W 78–69	5–4	Ramsey Center (823); Cullowhee, North Carolina
11/30/2013*; 3:00 pm	at Wright State	L 77–85	5–5	Nutter Center (3,008); Fairborn, Ohio
12/04/2013*; 7:00 pm	at Coastal Carolina	L 68–76	5–6	HTC Center (2,122); Conway, South Carolina
12/16/2013*; 7:00 pm	at Cleveland State	L 55–66	5–7	Wolstein Center (1,163); Cleveland, Ohio
12/18/2013*; 7:00 pm	Charleston Southern	W 92–84	6–7	Ramsey Center (682); Cullowhee, North Carolina
12/21/2013*; 2:00 pm, CSS	at Georgia	L 63–65	6–8	Stegeman Coliseum (6,069); Athens, Georgia
12/30/2013*; 7:00 pm	Milligan	W 106–72	7–8	Ramsey Center (953); Cullowhee, North Carolina
01/02/2014; 7:00 pm	UNC Greensboro	W 72–51	8–8 (1–0)	Ramsey Center (894); Cullowhee, North Carolina
01/04/2014; 2:00 pm	Elon	W 74–62	9–8 (2–0)	Ramsey Center (1,174); Cullowhee, North Carolina
01/11/2014; 2:00 pm	at Georgia Southern	W 68–67	10–8 (3–0)	Hanner Fieldhouse (1,372); Statesboro, Georgia
01/18/2014; 2:00 pm	Samford	W 67–64	11–8 (4–0)	Ramsey Center (2,146); Cullowhee, North Carolina
01/20/2014; 7:00 pm, ESPN3	at Wofford	L 60–71	11–9 (4–1)	Benjamin Johnson Arena (1,397); Spartanburg, North Carolina
01/23/2014; 7:00 pm	Davidson	L 77–82	11–10 (4–2)	Ramsey Center (3,002); Cullowhee, North Carolina
01/25/2014; 7:00 pm	at The Citadel	W 78–60	12–10 (5–2)	McAlister Field House (1,372); Charleston, South Carolina
01/30/2014; 7:00 pm	at Elon	L 60–74	12–11 (5–3)	Alumni Gym (1,312); Elon, North Carolina
02/08/2014; 7:00 pm	Appalachian State	W 84–75 ^{OT}	13–11 (6–3)	Ramsey Center (3,712); Cullowhee, North Carolina
02/10/2014; 7:00 pm, ESPN3	Furman	W 83–75	14–11 (7–3)	Ramsey Center (1,065); Cullowhee, North Carolina
02/14/2014; 7:00 pm	at Chattanooga	L 73–83	14–12 (7–4)	McKenzie Arena (3,209); Chattanooga, Tennessee
02/16/2014; 2:00 pm	at UNC Greensboro	W 82–77 ^{OT}	15–12 (8–4)	Greensboro Coliseum (2,466); Greensboro, North Carolina
02/20/2014; 7:00 pm	at Appalachian State	W 74–61	16–12 (9–4)	George M. Holmes Convocation Center (2,041); Boone, North Carolina
02/22/2014; 2:00 pm	The Citadel	W 70–52	17–12 (10–4)	Ramsey Center (1,241); Cullowhee, North Carolina
02/27/2014; 7:00 pm	Chattanooga	L 81–83 ^{OT}	17–13 (10–5)	Ramsey Center (1,638); Cullowhee, North Carolina
03/01/2014; 6:00 pm	at Samford	L 86–93	17–14 (10–6)	Pete Hanna Center (2,741); Homewood, Alabama
2014 SoCon tournament
03/08/2014; 2:30 pm, ESPN3	vs. Elon; Quarterfinals	W 66–64	18–14	U.S. Cellular Center (5,898); Asheville, North Carolina
03/09/2014; 6:00 pm, CSS	vs. Davidson; Semifinals	W 99–97 ^{OT}	19–14	U.S. Cellular Center (5,434); Asheville, North Carolina
03/10/2014; 9:00 pm, ESPN2	vs. Wofford; Championship	L 53–56	19–15	U.S. Cellular Center (5,799); Asheville, North Carolina
*Non-conference game. ^{#}Rankings from AP Poll. (#) Tournament seedings in parentheses. All times are in Eastern Time.
