= 2013–14 Elon Phoenix men's basketball team =

American college basketball season

2013–14 Elon Phoenix men's basketball
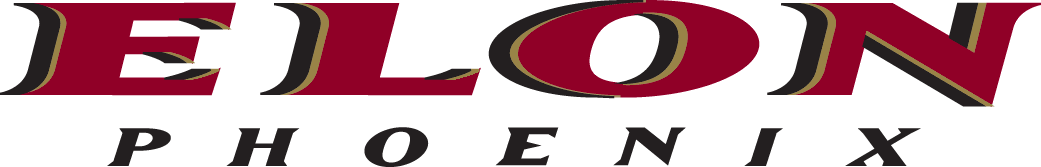
- Conference: Southern Conference
- Record: 18–14 (11–5 SoCon)
- Head coach: Matt Matheny (5th season)
- Assistant coaches: Tim Sweeney; Jack Wooten; Monty Sanders
- Home arena: Alumni Gym

2013–14 Southern Conference men's basketball standings
	Conf.				Overall
Team	W		L	PCT	W		L	PCT
Davidson	15	–	1	.938	20	–	13	.606
Chattanooga	12	–	4	.750	18	–	15	.545
Wofford †	11	–	5	.688	20	–	13	.606
Elon	11	–	5	.688	18	–	14	.563
Western Carolina	10	–	6	.625	19	–	15	.559
UNC Greensboro	7	–	9	.438	14	–	18	.438
Georgia Southern	6	–	10	.375	15	–	19	.441
Samford	6	–	10	.375	13	–	20	.394
Appalachian State	5	–	11	.313	9	–	21	.300
Furman	3	–	13	.188	9	–	21	.300
The Citadel	2	–	14	.125	7	–	26	.212
† 2014 SoCon Tournament winner

The 2013–14 Elon Phoenix men's basketball team represented Elon University during the 2013–14 NCAA Division I men's basketball season. The Phoenix, led by fifth year head coach Matt Matheny, played their home games at Alumni Gym and were members of the Southern Conference. They finished the season 18–14, 11–5 in SoCon play to finish in a tie for third place. They lost in the quarterfinals of the SoCon tournament to Western Carolina.

This was their last season as a member of the SoCon as they will join the Colonial Athletic Association in July, 2014.

== Roster ==
Number	Name	Position	Height	Weight	Year	Hometown
00	Brian Dawkins	Forward	6–8	240	Freshman	Jacksonville, Florida
1	Luke Eddy	Guard	6–0	190	Freshman	Charleston, West Virginia
3	Tanner Samson	Guard	6–4	195	Sophomore	Littleton, Colorado
5	Sam Hershberger	Guard	6–0	180	Sophomore	Vandalia, Ohio
10	Austin Hamilton	Guard	5–10	190	Junior	Herndon, Virginia
11	Kevin Blake	Guard	6–3	195	Junior	Toronto, Canada
12	Christian Hairston	Guard/Forward	6–7	205	Freshman	Greensboro, North Carolina
15	Tony Sabato	Center	6–7	220	Sophomore	Cincinnati, Ohio
20	Jack Isenbarger	Guard	6–2	190	Senior	Zionsville, Indiana
21	Ryley Beaumont	Forward	6–7	220	Senior	Millersville, Maryland
23	Egheosa Edomwonyi	Forward	6–7	235	Senior	Newark, New Jersey
24	Sebastian Koch	Guard	6–8	205	Senior	Munich, Germany
25	Ryder Bowline	Guard	6–4	225	Freshman	Cumming, Georgia
30	Wes Brewer	Forward	6–7	230	Freshman	Burlington, North Carolina
31	Lucas Troutman	Forward	6–10	228	Senior	Belton, South Carolina
32	Ryan Winters	Forward	6–7	218	Junior	Denver, Colorado
42	Patrick Ryan	Guard	6–6	190	Freshman	Darien, Connecticut

== Schedule ==
Date time, TV	Opponent	Result	Record	Site (attendance) city, state
Exhibition
11/04/2013*; 7:00 pm	Lynchburg	W 100–57		Alumni Gym (924); Elon, North Carolina
Regular season
11/08/2013*; 7:30 pm	Washington and Lee	W 114–64	1–0	Alumni Gym (1,607); Elon, North Carolina
11/10/2013*; 5:00 pm	at Marist	W 75–48	2–0	McCann Field House (1,607); Poughkeepsie, New York
11/15/2013*; 4:00 pm	at Charlotte	L 69–83	2–1	Dale F. Halton Arena (4,030); Charlotte, North Carolina
11/18/2013*; 5:00 pm	vs. Drexel; NIT Season Tip-Off	L 64–71	2–2	The RAC (2,106); Piscataway, New Jersey
11/19/2013*; 5:00 pm	vs. Canisius; NIT Season Tip-Off	L 85–86	2–3	The RAC (3,025); Piscataway, New Jersey
11/25/2013*; 7:30 pm	No. 1 (DII) Metro State; NIT Season Tip-Off	L 74–75	2–4	Alumni Gym (844); Elon, North Carolina
11/26/2013*; 7:30 pm	Georgia State; NIT Season Tip-Off	W 90–85	3–4	Alumni Gym (577); Elon, North Carolina
12/01/2013*; 2:00 pm	Columbia	W 68–65 ^{OT}	4–4	Alumni Gym (726); Elon, North Carolina
12/03/2013*; 7:00 pm	VMI	W 87–70	5–4	Alumni Gym (1,018); Elon, North Carolina
12/13/2013*; 8:30 pm, P12N	at Colorado	L 63–80	5–5	Coors Events Center (8,831); Boulder, Colorado
12/17/2013*; 7:00 pm, CBSSN	at Georgetown	L 76–85	5–6	Verizon Center (7,586); Washington, D.C.
12/19/2013*; 7:00 pm	Central Penn	W 126–78	6–6	Alumni Gym (987); Elon, North Carolina
12/22/2013*; 1:00 pm	at Florida Atlantic	W 67–62	7–6	FAU Arena (908); Boca Raton, Florida
12/31/2013*; 1:00 pm, ESPNU	vs. No. 7 Duke	L 48–86	7–7	Greensboro Coliseum (9,717); Greensboro, North Carolina
01/04/2014; 2:00 pm	at Western Carolina	L 62–74	7–8 (0–1)	Ramsey Center (1,174); Cullowhee, North Carolina
01/06/2014; 7:00 pm	Appalachian State	W 75–66	8–8 (1–1)	Alumni Gym (1,215); Elon, North Carolina
01/14/2014; 7:00 pm	The Citadel	W 74–65	9–8 (2–1)	Alumni Gym (1,309); Elon, North Carolina
01/16/2014; 7:00 pm	at Davidson	W 87–85 ^{OT}	10–8 (3–1)	John M. Belk Arena (3,970); Davidson, North Carolina
01/18/2014*; 7:00 pm	No. 16 Massachusetts	L 74–84	10–9	Alumni Gym (1,857); Elon, North Carolina
01/23/2014; 7:00 pm	at Chattanooga	L 63–84	10–10 (3–2)	McKenzie Arena (4,662); Chattanooga, Tennessee
01/25/2014; 7:00 pm	at Samford	L 59–62	10–11 (3–3)	Pete Hanna Center (1,418); Homewood, Alabama
01/30/2014; 7:00 pm	Western Carolina	W 74–60	11–11 (4–3)	Alumni Gym (1,312); Elon, North Carolina
02/01/2014; 2:00 pm	at Appalachian State	W 83–76	12–11 (5–3)	George M. Holmes Convocation Center (2,004); Boone, North Carolina
02/06/2014; 7:00 pm	UNC Greensboro	W 72–66	13–11 (6–3)	Alumni Gym (1,361); Elon, North Carolina
02/08/2014; 7:00 pm, ESPN3	Georgia Southern	W 60–59	14–11 (7–3)	Alumni Gym (1,427); Elon, North Carolina
02/15/2014; 7:00 pm	Samford	W 86–69	15–11 (8–3)	Alumni Gym (1,607); Elon, North Carolina
02/19/2014; 7:00 pm	at UNC Greensboro	W 81–68	16–11 (9–3)	Greensboro Coliseum (2,385); Greensboro, North Carolina
02/22/2014; 2:00 pm	at Georgia Southern	W 66–61	17–11 (10–3)	Hanner Fieldhouse (1,312); Statesboro, Georgia
02/24/2014; 7:00 pm	at Furman; Postponed from 2/12	W 78–49	18–11 (11–3)	Timmons Arena (926); Greenville, South Carolina
02/27/2014; 7:00 pm	Wofford	L 59–63	18–12 (11–4)	Alumni Gym (1,451); Elon, North Carolina
03/01/2014; 7:00 pm	Davidson	L 69–86	18–13 (11–5)	Alumni Gym (1,871); Elon, North Carolina
2014 SoCon tournament
03/08/2014; 2:30 pm, ESPN3	vs. Western Carolina; Quarterfinals	L 64–66	18–14	U.S. Cellular Center (5,898); Asheville, North Carolina
*Non-conference game. ^{#}Rankings from AP Poll. (#) Tournament seedings in parentheses. All times are in Eastern Time.
