= MI-Connection =

MI-Connection now Continuum (pronounced My Connection, Continue um) is the locally owned and operated cable and Internet system serving the towns of Mooresville, Davidson and Cornelius and Huntersville in the counties of Mecklenburg and Iredell in North Carolina (M for Mecklenburg, I for Iredell)

== History ==
MI-Connection was created after the towns of Mooresville, Davidson, and Cornelius agreed to buy-out the local cable system from Time Warner Cable after the Adelphia cable acquisition in 2007.
