= Zak Irvin =

American basketball player (born 1994)

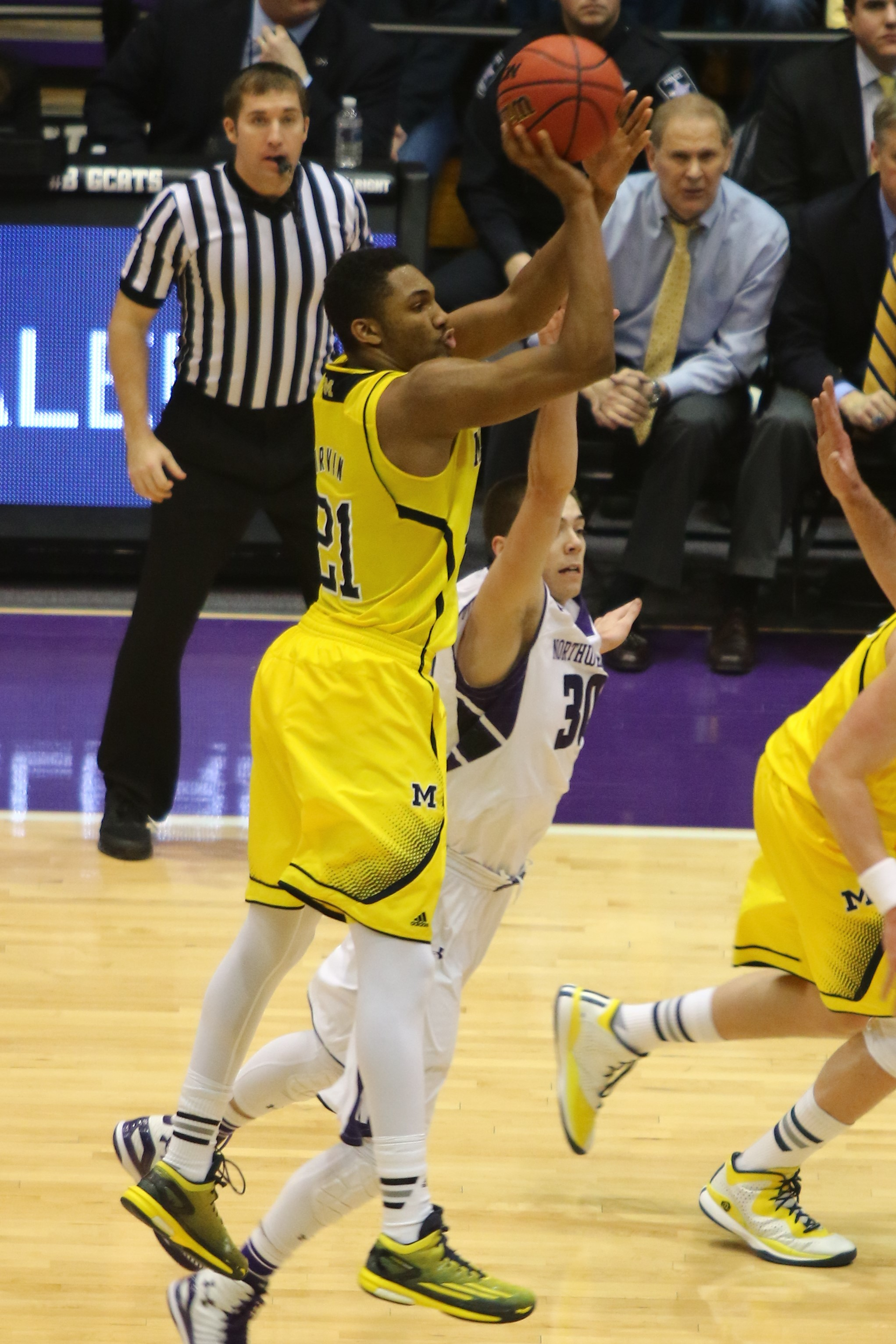
- Irvin in 2015

Free agent
- Position: Shooting guard

Personal information
- Born: September 5, 1994 (age 32) Fishers, Indiana, U.S.
- Listed height: 6 ft 6 in (1.98 m)
- Listed weight: 215 lb (98 kg)

Career information
- High school: Hamilton Southeastern (Fishers, Indiana)
- College: Michigan (2013–2017)
- NBA draft: 2017: undrafted
- Playing career: 2017–present

Career history
- 2018: Westchester Knicks
- 2018: Metropolitanos de Mauricio Báez
- 2018: Abejas de León
- 2018–2020: Westchester Knicks
- 2020–2022: Bank of Taiwan
- 2023–2024: Grand Rapids Gold
- 2024: Cañeros del Este
- 2025–2026: Manchester Basketball

Career highlights
- Regular Season MVP (2022); First-team Parade All-American (2013); Indiana Mr. Basketball (2013); Indiana Gatorade Player of the Year (2013)
- Stats at Basketball Reference

Zakarie Tyler Irvin (born September 5, 1994) is an American professional basketball player who last played for the Manchester Basketball of the Super League Basketball (SLB). He played college basketball for the Michigan Wolverines. He was named the 2013 Indiana Mr. Basketball and Indiana Boys Basketball Gatorade Player of the Year while playing for Hamilton Southeastern High School. At Michigan, he was twice recognized as Big Ten Conference Freshman of the Week for the 2013–14 team, which won the 2013–14 Big Ten Conference regular-season championship outright. He was a 2015–16 Big Ten Conference men's basketball season All-Big Ten honorable mention honoree by the coaches and the media as well as a 2016 Big Ten Conference men's basketball tournament All-Tournament Team selection as a junior. He was a 2016–17 Big Ten Conference men's basketball season All-Big Ten honorable mention honoree by the media as a senior as well as a 2017 Big Ten Conference men's basketball tournament All-Tournament Team selection for the champion 2016–17 Wolverines. He led the Big Ten in minutes played as a senior and tied the Michigan record for career games played (142).

== Early life ==
Irvin was born in Fishers, Indiana to Marcia and James Irvin on September 5, 1994.

As a freshman at Hamilton Southeastern, Irvin played junior varsity basketball. June 13, 2011, was the first day that Michigan offered scholarships to the class of 2013. On July 31, 2011, Irvin announced his non-binding verbal commitment to Michigan. At the time, he was ranked 97th in the class of 2013 according to Rivals.com and 74th according to ESPN. Scout.com ranked him as the 22nd-best shooting guard. By the time of his commitment, he had scholarship offers from Purdue, Indiana, Baylor, Miami, Xavier, Tennessee, Illinois and Butler. This commitment came one day before Derrick Walton joined Michigan's 2013 recruiting class. During the summer of 2012, Irvin jumped in the Rivals.com ranking from 68th to 31st in the national class of 2013. On November 16, 2012, Michigan men's basketball received a signed National Letter of Intent from the 6-foot-6-inch (1.98 m) Irvin. At Hamilton Southeastern High School, he earned 2013 Indiana Mr. Basketball and Parade All-American recognition. As Indiana Mr. Basketball, he succeeded former teammate Gary Harris, and the duo became the state's first back-to-back winners from the same high school. He was also named 2013 Indiana Boys Basketball Gatorade Player of the Year. By the end of his high school career, he was ranked 24th by Rivals.

College recruiting
| Name | Hometown | School | Height | Weight | Commit date |
|---|---|---|---|---|---|
| Zak Irvin; SF | Fishers, IN | Hamilton Southeastern High School (IN) | 6 ft 6.25 in (1.99 m) | 185 lb (84 kg) | Jul 31, 2011 |
| Zak Irvin; SF | Recruit ratings: Scout: Rivals: (91) | | | | |
Overall recruit ranking: Scout: 51, 12 (SF) Rivals: 24, 6 (SG) ESPN: 22, 6 (SF), 1 (IN)
Note: In many cases, Scout, Rivals, 247Sports, On3, and ESPN may conflict in their listings of height and weight.; In these cases, the average was taken. ESPN grades are on a 100-point scale.; Sources: "Michigan 2013 Basketball Commitments". Rivals.; "2013 Michigan Basketball Commits". Scout.; "ESPN". ESPN.; "Scout.com Team Recruiting Rankings". Scout.; "2013 Team Ranking". Rivals.

== College ==
=== Freshman year ===
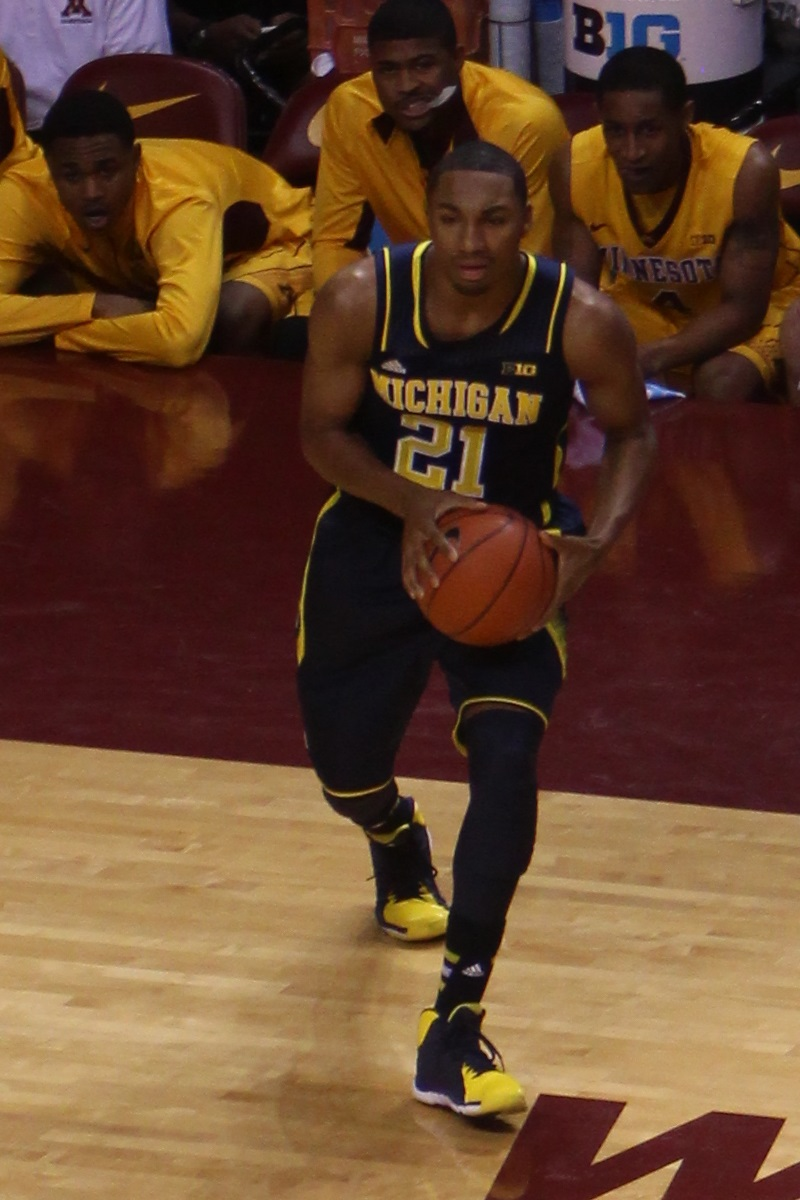
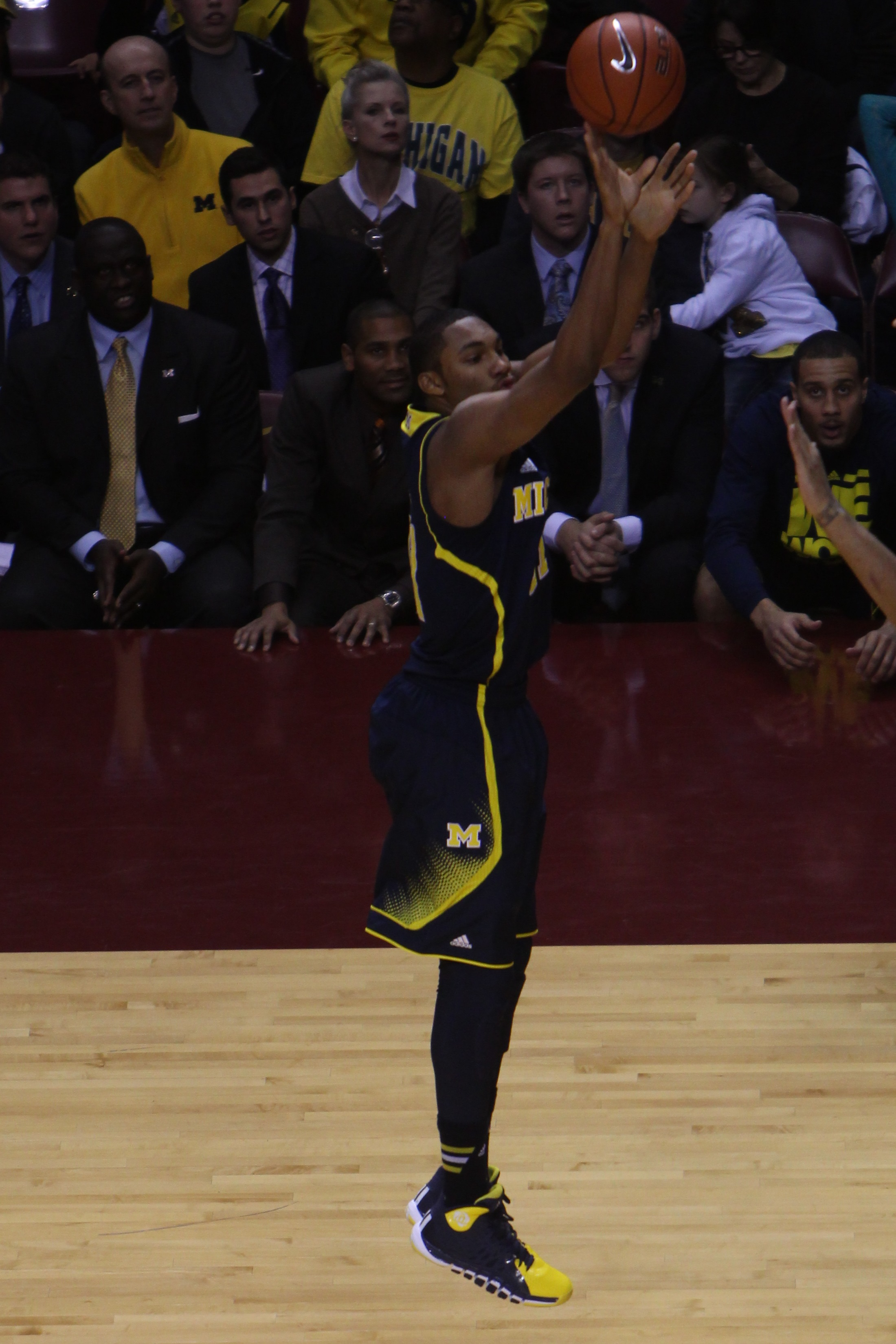
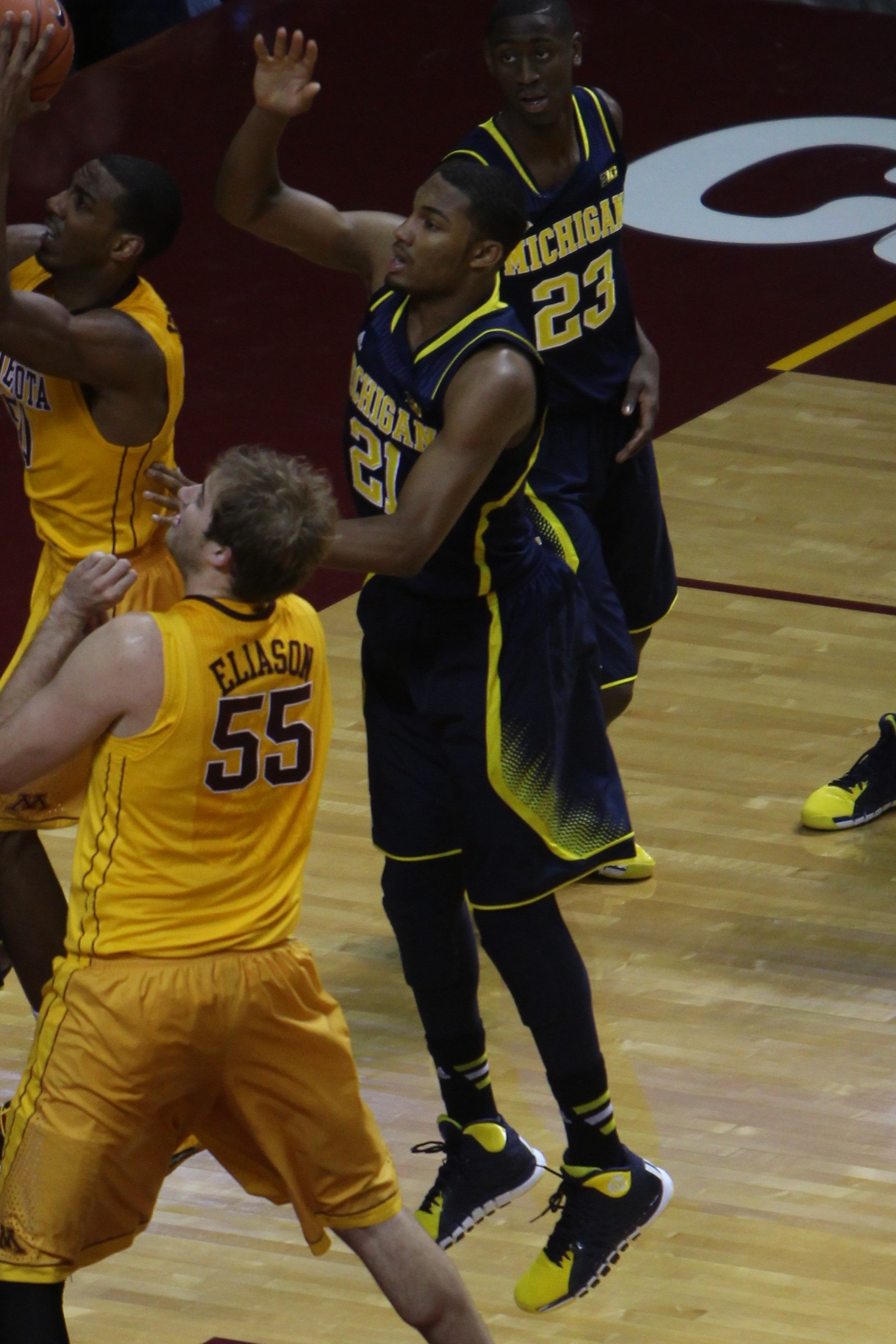
Irvin in the Michigan–Minnesota 2013–14 Big Ten season opener

Irvin joined a team that had just lost Trey Burke and Tim Hardaway Jr. to the 2013 NBA draft. The 2012–13 Wolverines had reached the championship game of the 2013 NCAA Men's Division I Basketball Tournament, losing to Louisville. Prior to his freshman season, Sporting News named him the second best Big Ten Conference newcomer. On November 8, the Wolverines opened the season against UMass Lowell. Michigan played six freshmen, and Irvin was one of five who came off the bench in his debut that night; he scored 10 points. When 2013–14 Wolverine team leading scorer Stauskas sat out the November 29 game against Coppin State, Irvin posted 24 points on 9-for-13 field goal shooting, including 6-for-10 three point shooting as Michigan won in an 87–45 rout. He was recognized on December 2, with a Big Ten Conference Freshman of the Week honor. On December 21, he posted 12 points (on 4-for-8 three-point shooting) and 6 rebounds against Stanford. On December 23, he earned co-Freshman of the Week honors with Noah Vonleh from the Big Ten Conference. Michigan clinched its first outright (unshared) Big Ten Conference championship since 1985–86. The 2013–14 team advanced to the elite eight round of the 2014 NCAA Division I men's basketball tournament before being eliminated by Kentucky.

=== Sophomore year ===
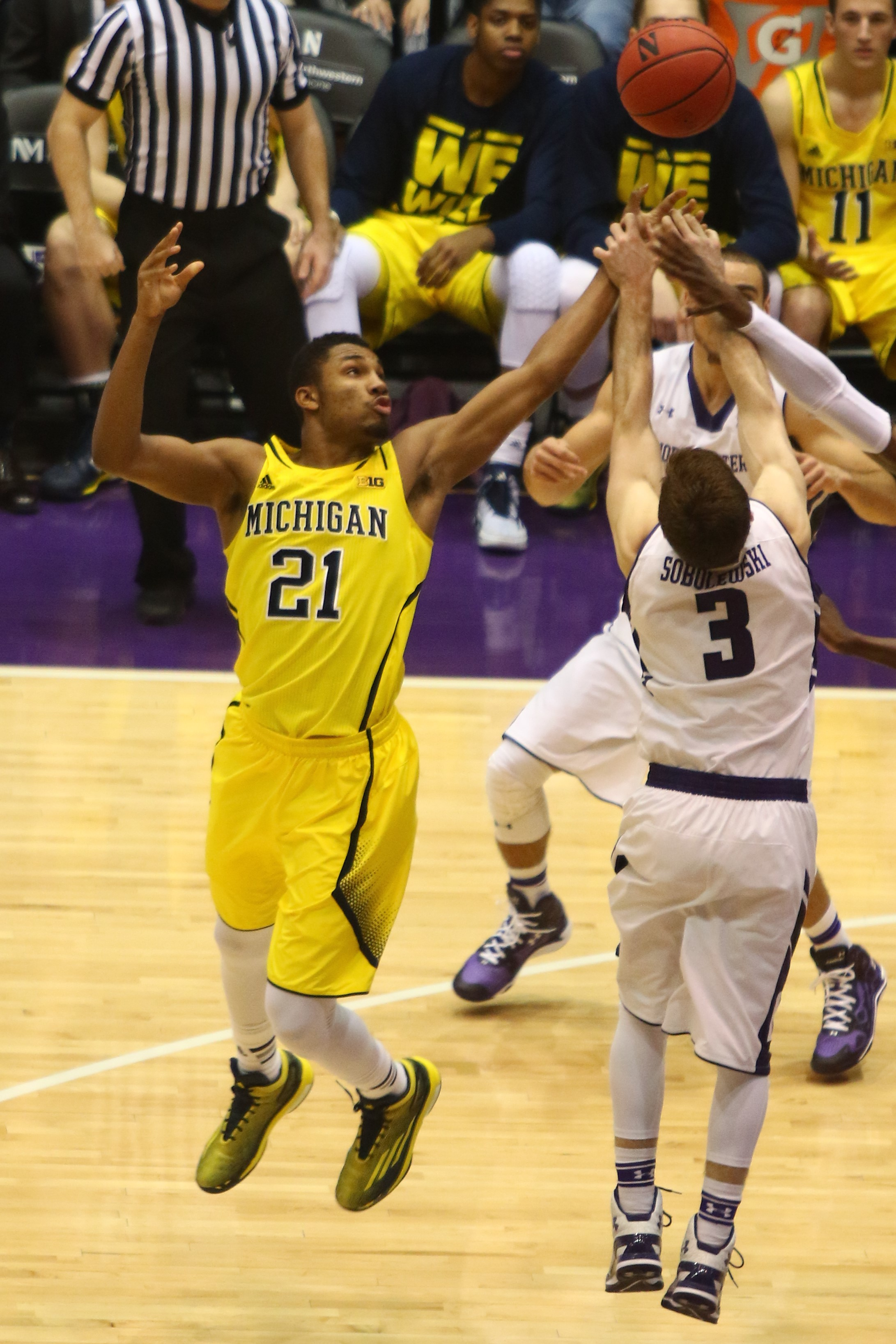
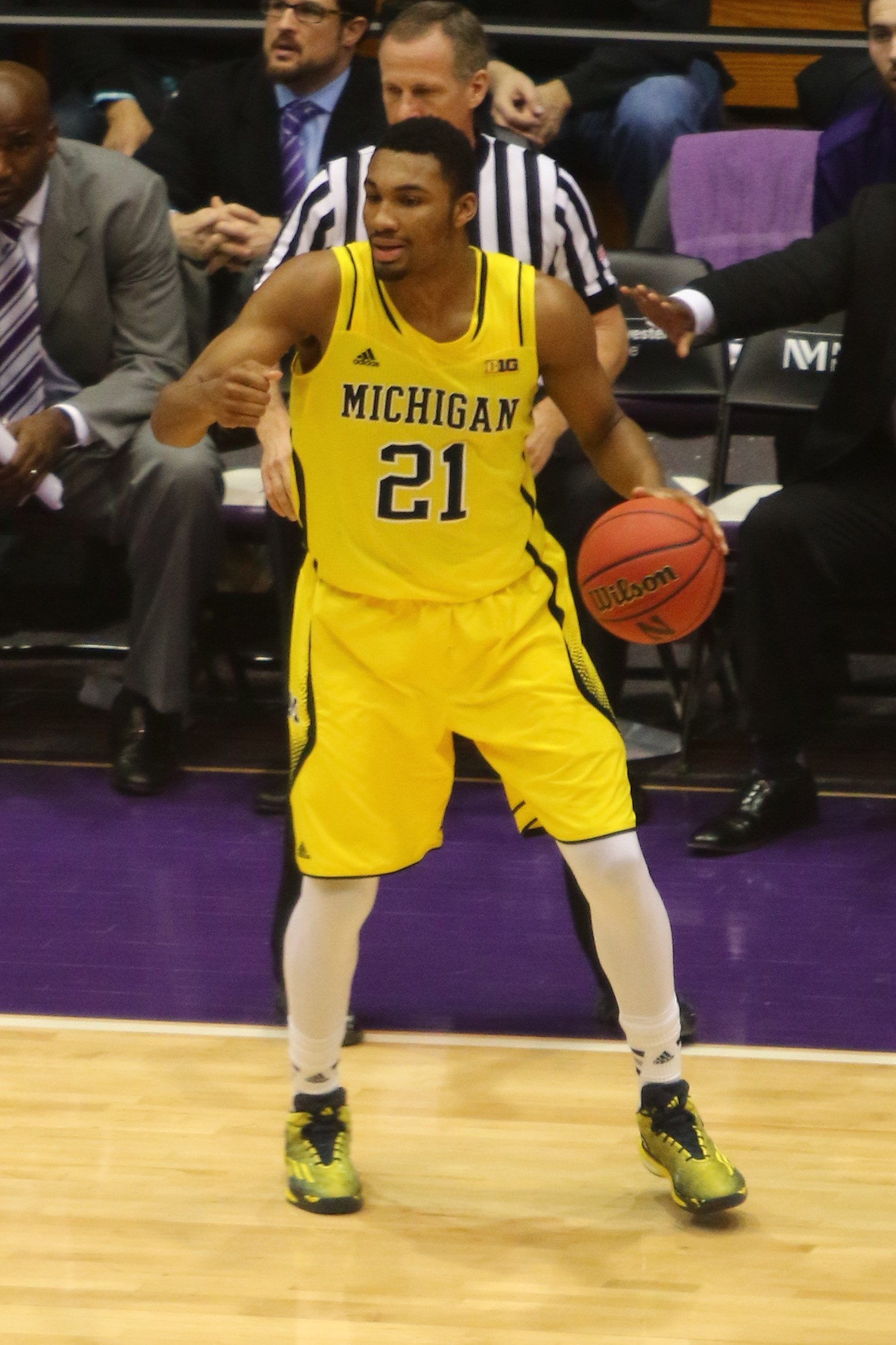
Irvin in action for the 2014–15 Wolverines

After coming off the bench in all 37 appearances as a freshman, Irvin started in the opening game of the season as a sophomore on November 15 for the 2014–15 team against Hillsdale and was one of three 20-point scorers for the team (along with Walton and Caris LeVert). On December 22, 2014, Irvin posted a career high of seven rebounds and tied his career high with 3 assists against Coppin State. On January 9, Irvin tallied a career high of nine rebounds against Penn State. On January 27, Irvin recorded his first career double-double and the team's first of the year with 14 points and a career-high 12 rebounds as Michigan defeated Nebraska. He also tied a career high with 3 assists On February 8, Irvin had a career-high 3 steals and season-high 23 points against Indiana. On March 3 against Northwestern, Irvin posted his and the team's second double-double of the season in a double-overtime loss with a career-high 28 points and 11 rebounds. Irvin played a career-high 49 minutes in the game. On March 12, Irvin tallied 14 points and a career-high six assists against Illinois in the second round of the 2015 Big Ten Conference men's basketball tournament to help Michigan extend its streak of opening round wins in the tournament to 9. In the third round against Wisconsin, Irvin posted his third double-double of his career and of the season with 21 points and 11 rebounds.

=== Junior year ===
On September 9, 2015, head coach John Beilein announced that Irvin would be sidelined for 6 to 8 weeks, but that he was expected to be available near the beginning of the season for the 2015–16 team. In preseason top 100 player rankings Irvin was unranked by ESPN and ranked 77 by NBC Sports. He did not appear in the November 13 season opener against Northern Michigan. On November 16 against Elon, Irvin made his season debut with three assists and one rebound but went scoreless. On November 20 against Xavier, Irvin made his first start of the season, posting seven points and one rebound. On December 8, Michigan lost 82–58 to (#19 AP Poll/unranked Coaches Poll) SMU despite 9 assists from Irvin. On January 12 with leading scorer LeVert sidelined, Michigan defeated (#3/#3) Maryland 70–67 behind a season-high and game-high 22 points from Irvin. On January 20, Michigan defeated Minnesota 74–69 with Irvin's fourth career double-double (a 19-point, 11-rebound effort). On January 27, Irvin tied his career high with 12 rebounds as Michigan defeated Rutgers for the eighth time in eight all-time meetings against the Rutgers Scarlet Knights. On February 13, Michigan defeated (#18/16) Purdue, 61–56. Irvin scored 16 of his game-high 22 points in the second half, including a three-point shot and the go-ahead basket in the final three minutes as the Wolverines finished the game on an 11–0 scoring run after falling behind 56–50. On February 16, Irvin posted 15 points, nine rebounds, three assists, and two steals, becoming the 50th Wolverine to eclipse 1,000 career points. Following the 2015–16 Big Ten season, he was listed as an honorable mention All-Big Ten selection by the coaches and the media.

On March 10, in Michigan's first game of the 2016 Big Ten Conference men's basketball tournament at Bankers Life Fieldhouse against Northwestern, Irvin scored the game-winning overtime basket in front of his hometown crowd with 3.3 seconds left. Irvin, who grew up in nearby Fishers, Indiana, had 19 points and eight rebounds. The game marked his 100th career game with Michigan, becoming just the 64th Wolverine to reach the milestone. The following day in the March 11, 2016, Big Ten Conference men's basketball tournament quarterfinals Michigan upset of No. 1-seeded (#10/#10) Indiana. In the game, 2013 Indiana Mr. Basketball Irvin scored a team-high 17 points, marking the third time in only three wins against a nationally ranked conference foe that he led the team in scoring. Irvin was selected to the All-Tournament Team. On March 16 in the First Four round of the 2016 NCAA Division I men's basketball tournament, Michigan defeated Tulsa, 67–62, behind a team-high 16 points from Irvin, including a go-ahead three-point shot with 53 seconds left and late free throws.

=== Senior year ===
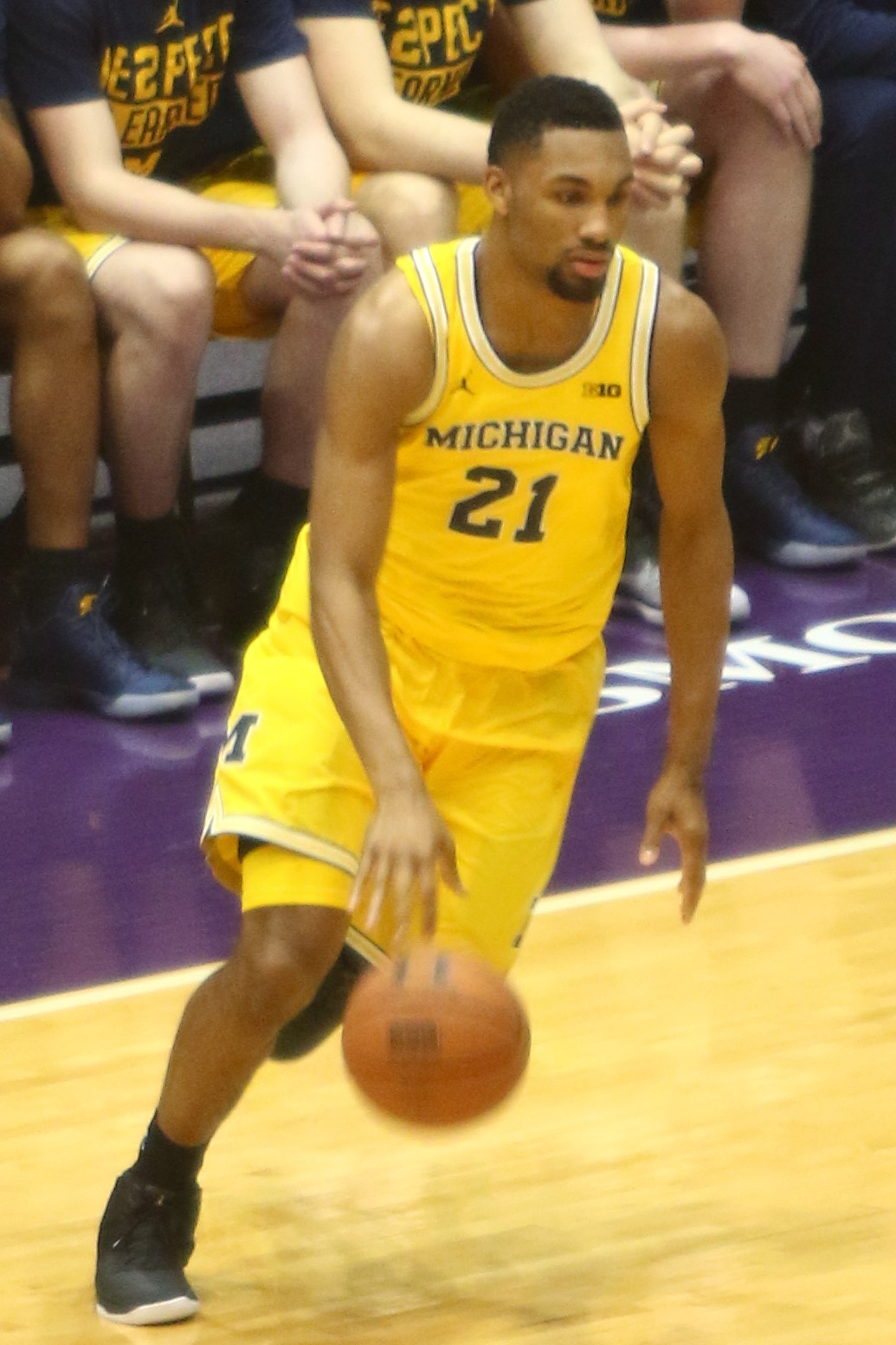
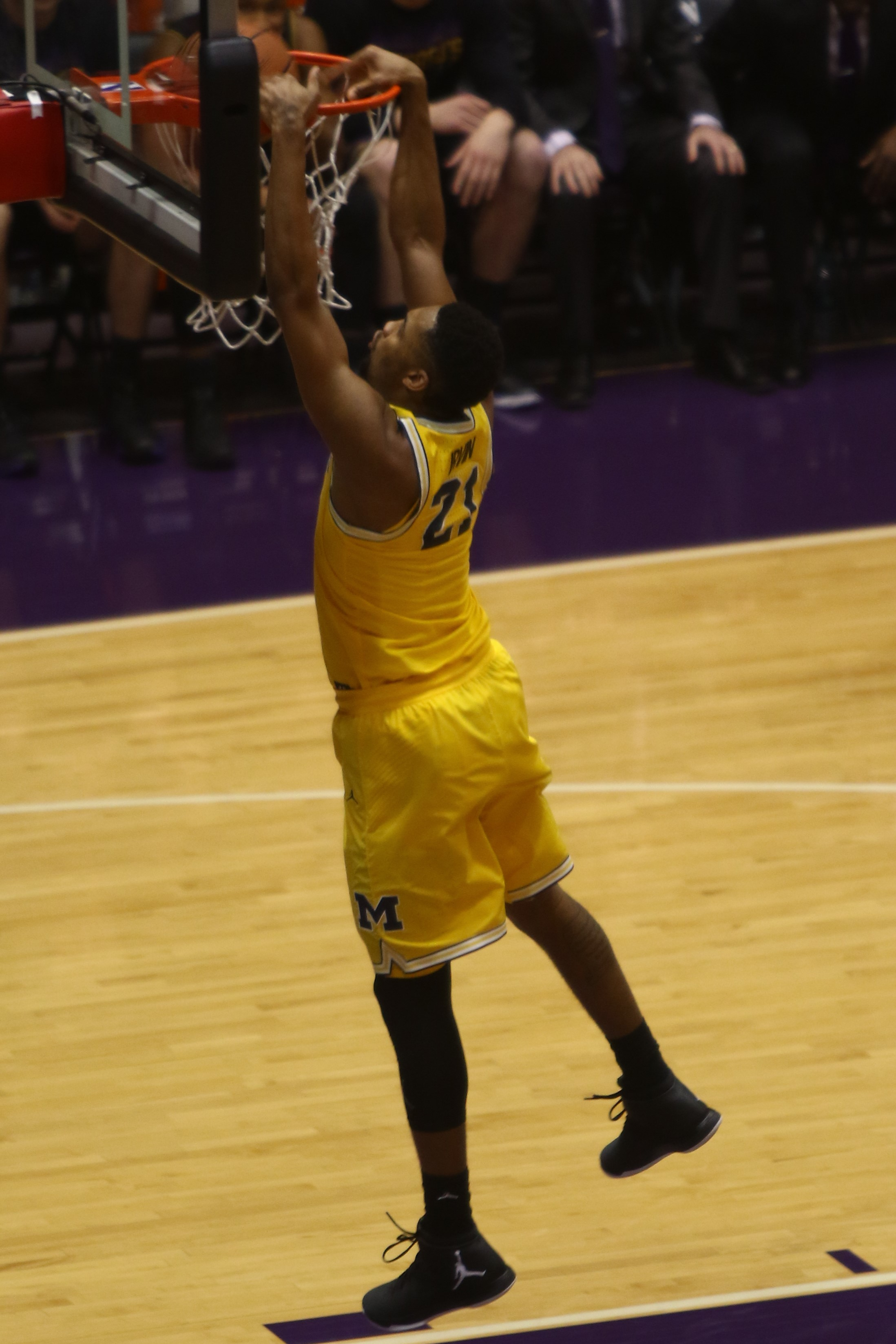
Irvin in action for the 2016–17 Wolverines

He served as a co-captain with Derrick Walton. In the final four of the 2016 2K Sports Classic held at the Madison Square Garden on November 17 and 18, Irvin posted 16 points against Marquette in the semifinal and 16 against SMU to earn tournament MVP as Michigan won the tournament. Following the season, he was an honorable mention All-Big Ten selection by the media. In the 2017 Big Ten Conference men's basketball tournament championship game 71–56 victory over (#23/#24) Wisconsin, Irvin contributed 15 points for eighth-seeded Michigan. During the Tournament, Irvin averaged 14.8 points, 6.5 rebounds and 3.3 assist. After the tournament, he was named to the Big Ten tournament Team. The team reached the round of sixteen of the 2017 NCAA Division I men's basketball tournament. Irvin finished first in minutes played (35.4) in the Big Ten for the season. He finished his career tied for first in career games played in school history (142), third in career three-point shots made (241) and fourth in career minutes played (4,225). Irvin was one of five Big Ten players invited to participate in the annual Portsmouth Invitational Tournament for the top NCAA seniors (along with Bronson Koenig, Malcolm Hill, Marc Loving and Tai Webster).

== Professional career ==
Following the season, Irvin went undrafted in the 2017 NBA draft and signed to play with the Miami Heat for the 2017 NBA Summer League. Ultimately, Irvin signed with Victoria Libertas Pesaro of the Lega Basket Serie A (the Italian league) in July 2017. Irvin left the team in mid-September.

On December 26, 2017, Irvin joined the Israeli team Hapoel Eilat on a trial contract. He parted ways with Eilat before appearing in any game for them.

=== Westchester Knicks (2018) ===
On January 25, 2018, Irvin was acquired by the Westchester Knicks of the NBA G League. On February 2, he debuted with a 10-point, 10-rebound double-double in a 107–93 victory against the Greensboro Swarm.

=== Dominican Republic (2018) ===
On May 2, 2018, Irvin signed with Metropolitanos de Mauricio Báez of the Dominican Torneo de Baloncesto Superior (TBS).

=== Mexico (2018) ===
For the 2018–19 season, Irvin signed with the Abejas de León of the Mexican Liga Nacional de Baloncesto Profesional. He had 16 points and 9 rebounds in a loss to Aguacateros on November 3, 2018.

=== Return to Westchester (2018–2020) ===
On December 6, 2018, Irvin re-signed with the Westchester Knicks. He was on the Knicks 2019 NBA Summer League roster. On October 17, 2019, Irvin signed with the New York Knicks, but was waived on October 18.

=== Bank of Taiwan (2020–2022) ===
Irvin played for the Bank of Taiwan of the Super Basketball League in Taiwan for the 2020–21 and 2021–22 seasons.

On October 24, 2022, Irvin joined the Maine Celtics' training camp roster. However, he did not make the opening-night roster.

=== Grand Rapids Gold (2023–2024) ===
On March 7, 2023, Irvin was acquired by the NBA G League's Grand Rapids Gold.

=== Cañeros del Este (2024) ===
On June 13, 2024, Irvin signed with the Cañeros del Este of the Dominican Liga Nacional de Baloncesto.

=== Manchester Basketball (2025–2026) ===
On January 20, 2025, Irvin signed with the Manchester Basketball of the Super League Basketball (SLB) for the remainder of the 2024–25 season. On July 2, he returned to the Manchester Basketball for the 2025–26 season.

== See also ==
- Michigan Wolverines men's basketball statistical leaders
