= Jon Horford =

American basketball player (born 1991)

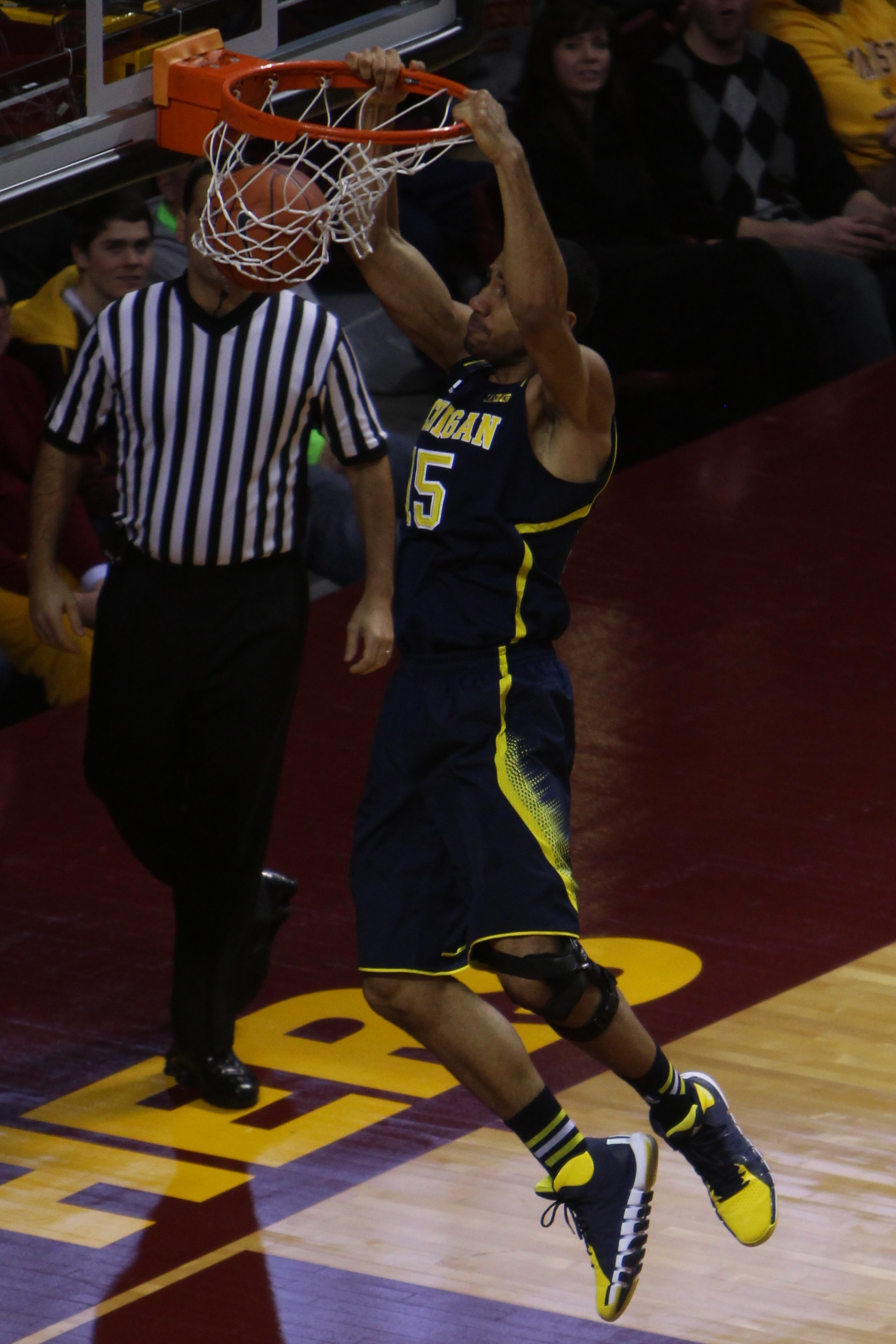
- Horford with Michigan in 2013

Free agent
- Position: Power forward

Personal information
- Born: October 16, 1991 (age 35) Lansing, Michigan, US
- Listed height: 6 ft 10 in (2.08 m)
- Listed weight: 245 lb (111 kg)

Career information
- High school: Grand Ledge (Grand Ledge, Michigan)
- College: Michigan (2010–2014); Florida (2014–2015)
- NBA draft: 2015: undrafted
- Playing career: 2015–present

Career history
- 2015: Indios de San Francisco de Macorís
- 2015–2017: Canton Charge
- 2017–2019: Grand Rapids Drive
- Stats at Basketball Reference

Jonathon Kelly Horford (born October 16, 1991) is an American professional basketball player. He played four years with the Michigan Wolverines ending with the 2013–14 team and then transferring to the Florida Gators for the 2014–15 season. He was an All-State high school basketball player for Grand Ledge High School in Michigan. His father Tito Horford, and brother Al Horford, have both played in the National Basketball Association.

== Early years ==
Horford is the son of Elizabeth and Tito Horford. His father was the first player born in the Dominican Republic to play in the NBA. His older brother, Al, led the Florida Gators to NCAA basketball championships in 2006 and 2007, and was the third overall pick in the 2007 NBA draft. Horford attended the 2007 NCAA Tournament at the Georgia Dome to watch his brother. Horford played high school basketball at Grand Ledge High School in Grand Ledge, Michigan where he was selected as a first-team Class A All-State player in 2010 by the Associated Press, The Detroit News, and the Detroit Free Press. His younger brother Josh Horford played for the Grand Ledge High School basketball team.

College recruiting
Name	Hometown	School	Height	Weight	Commit date
Jon Horford; PF	Grand Ledge, Michigan	Grand Ledge High School, (MI)	6 ft 8.5 in (2.04 m)	192.5 lb (87.3 kg)	Mar 26, 2010
Jon Horford; PF	Recruit ratings: Scout: Rivals: (88)				
Overall recruit ranking: Scout: 42 (PF) ESPN: 76 (PF)
Note: In many cases, Scout, Rivals, 247Sports, On3, and ESPN may conflict in their listings of height and weight.; In these cases, the average was taken. ESPN grades are on a 100-point scale.; Sources: "Michigan 2010 Basketball Commitments". Rivals.; "2010 Michigan Basketball Commits". Scout.; "ESPN". ESPN.; "Scout.com Team Recruiting Rankings". Scout.; "2010 Team Ranking". Rivals.

== College career ==
=== Michigan ===
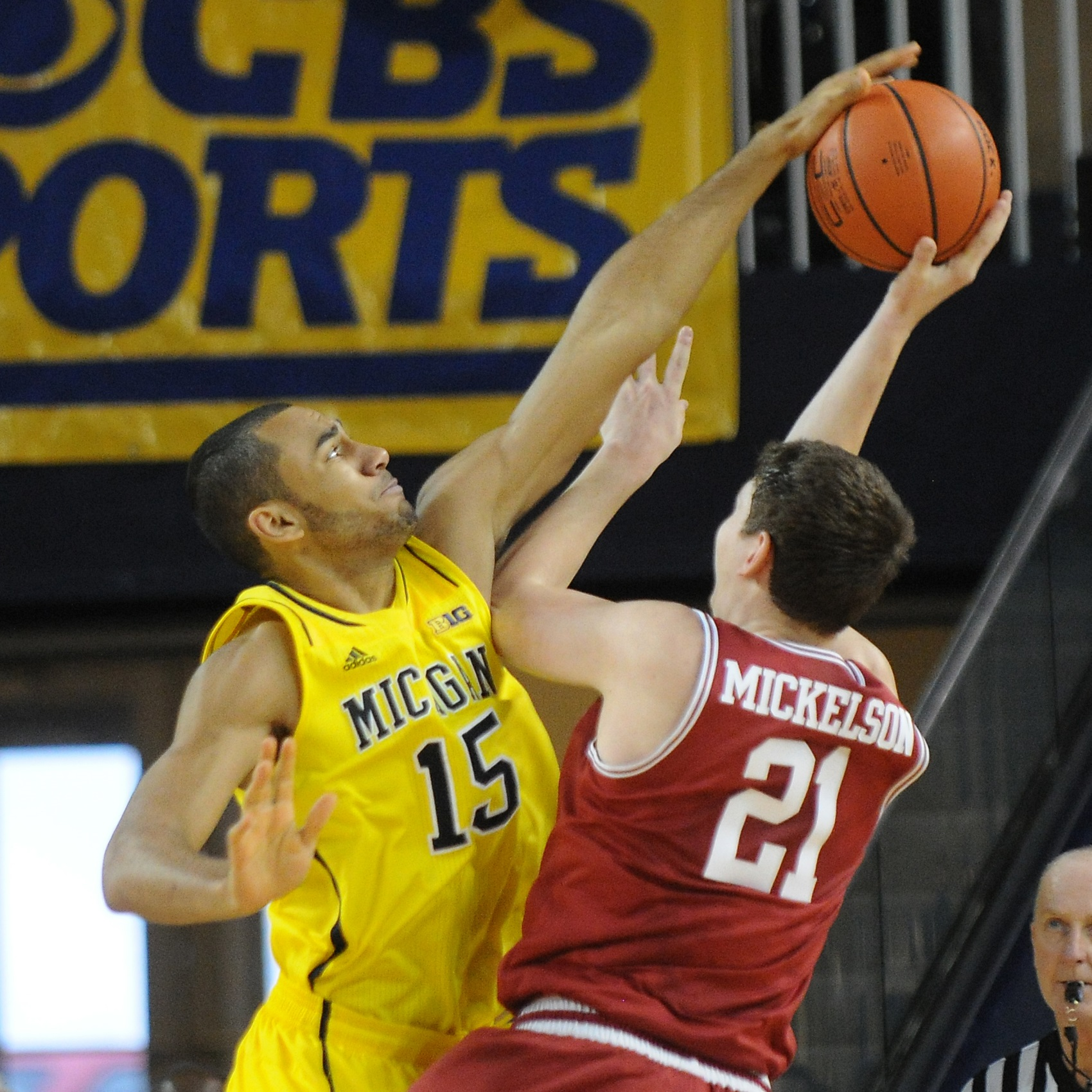
Horford blocks a shot in 2012

In March 2010, Horford verbally committed to play college basketball at the University of Michigan, choosing Michigan over California and Providence. He signed a letter of intent two weeks later at the opening of the spring signing period on April 14.

As a freshman, Horford appeared in 29 games for the 2010–11 Michigan Wolverines men's basketball team. He totaled 11 blocked shots, good for second place on the Michigan team behind Jordan Morgan. He also totaled 58 rebounds as he helped the team to a 21–14 record.

As a sophomore, Horford gained 30 pounds (from 220 to 250 pounds), raising expectations that he would become a more dominant player. Early in the season, he appeared in nine games for the 2011–12 Michigan Wolverines men's basketball team. He scored a career-high 12 points, all in the first half, against UCLA at the Maui Invitational Tournament on November 23, 2011. In early December, he sustained a stress fracture to his right foot that resulted in his missing the final 25 games of the season. Horford was granted a medical redshirt due to the injury.

As a redshirt sophomore, Horford appeared in 28 games and averaged 9.2 minutes per game for the 2012–13 Michigan Wolverines men's basketball team. He missed five games after sustaining a knee injury in a December 15 game against West Virginia. Horford blocked three shots on two separate occasions, against Arkansas on December 8, 2012, and against Northwestern on January 30, 2013. In mid-March, he scored a season-high 11 points in Michigan's 83–66 victory over Penn State in the Big Ten tournament. He totaled 16 blocks for the season, ranking fourth on the team behind Mitch McGary (24), Trey Burke (18), and Tim Hardaway Jr. (17).

As Michigan advanced to the 2013 Final Four at the Georgia Dome, Horford drew attention for his interest in reading ancient Chinese texts. In the locker room after Michigan's overtime victory over Kansas, Horford was in a corner of the locker room reading "Tao Te Ching", a Chinese text written around the 6th century BC. Horford's older brother, Al, who had played for Florida's back-to-back national championship teams, expressed pride: "It's just exciting. He was here watching me a few years ago going through the Final Four in Atlanta and now here's here, so we're super excited." The 2013 final four was at the same Georgia Dome that Al had won the championship at in 2007. Michigan reached the championship game.

On November 8, 2013, Horford posted a career high 12 rebounds against the UMass Lowell in the season opener. In the subsequent game against South Carolina State on November 12, Horford again established a career high of 15 rebounds and added 9 points leaving him a point shy of a double-double. Prior to the game, the last time a Michigan Wolverine had posted 15 or more rebounds was when Manny Harris posted 16 on December 29, 2008, against North Carolina Central. In the January 2 Big Ten Conference opener against Minnesota at the Williams Arena, Horford established a new career high with 14 points and added 9 rebounds. On March 4, Horford had 10 rebounds against Illinois to help Michigan clinch its 14th and 8th outright Big Ten Conference championship. The 2013–14 team advanced to the elite eight round of the 2014 NCAA Men's Division I Basketball Tournament before being eliminated by Kentucky. Horford announced on April 10 that he would use his 5th year of redshirt eligibility by transferring to a graduate program at another school. Because he graduated in April, he was eligible to immediately join another team for the 2014–15 NCAA Division I men's basketball season. On April 26, Horford announced he was transferring to play for the Florida Gators men's basketball team.

=== Florida ===
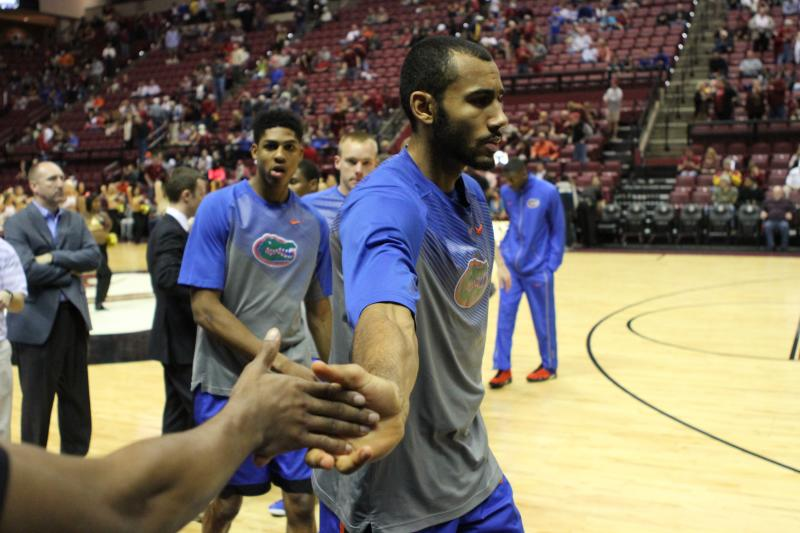
Horford playing for Florida

Horford opened the season in the starting lineup for the 2014–15 Florida Gators on November 14 against William & Mary. Horford posted 17 points against Miami (FL) on November 17. He posted a double-double with 11 rebounds and 10 points against Georgetown on November 26. Horford averaged 6.5 points and 4.8 rebounds per game for Florida.

== Professional career ==
=== Basketball ===
After graduating from Florida, Horford joined Indios de San Francisco de Macorís of the Liga Nacional de Baloncesto in May 2015. He appeared in seven games for the club, averaging 2.7 points and 4.6 rebounds per game. He left the team in June and returned to the United States where he joined the Atlanta Hawks for the 2015 NBA Summer League. He managed just one appearance for the Hawks.

On September 18, 2015, Horford signed with the Milwaukee Bucks, but was waived on October 7. On December 23, he was acquired by the Canton Charge of the NBA Development League. He made his debut for the Charge later that night against the Grand Rapids Drive, recording 10 points and 9 rebounds in a 113–111 loss.

On August 25, 2016, Horford signed with Stella Artois Leuven Bears of the Belgian League. However, he left the squad without playing a game for them. He ultimately returned to Canton for the 2016–17 season. He joined Big X, a team composed of former Big 10 players, in The Basketball Tournament 2018.

=== Politics ===
In 2022, Horford ran for the Michigan House of Representatives as a Democrat in the 77th district. He was defeated in the Democratic primary by Emily Dievendorf by just 25 votes.
