= 2013–14 Michigan Wolverines men's basketball team =

American college basketball season

2013–14 Michigan Wolverines men's basketball

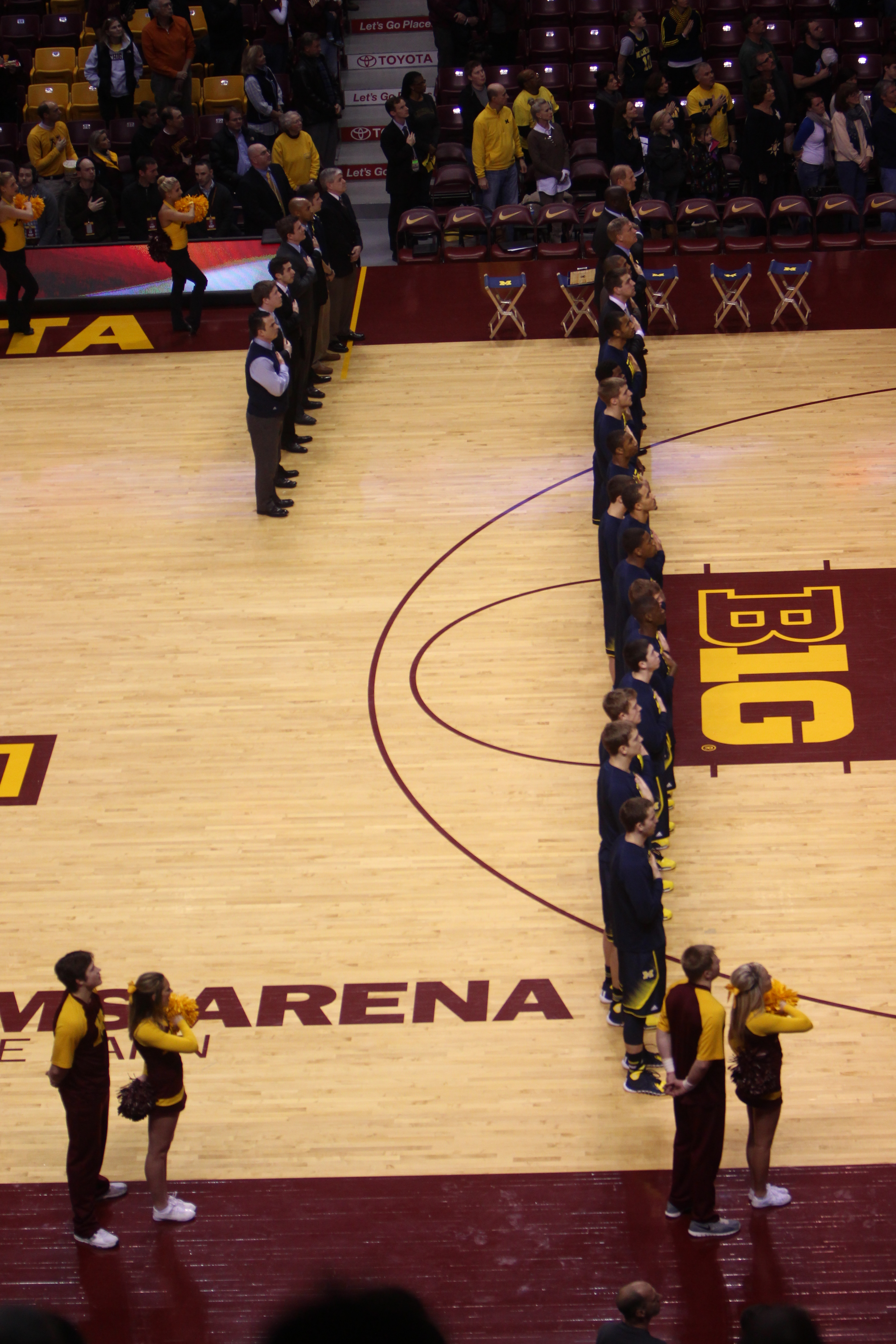

Big Ten regular season champions

NCAA tournament, Elite Eight
- Conference: Big Ten Conference

Ranking
- Coaches: No. 6
- AP: No. 7
- Record: 28–9 (15–3 Big Ten)
- Head coach: John Beilein (7th season)
- Assistant coaches: Jeff Meyer; LaVall Jordan; Bacari Alexander
- MVP: Nik Stauskas
- Captains: Glenn Robinson III; Jon Horford; Jordan Morgan
- Home arena: Crisler Center

2013–14 Big Ten Conference men's basketball standings
| | Conf. | | | | Overall |
| Team | W | | L | PCT | W | | L | PCT |
|---|---|---|---|---|---|---|---|---|
| No. 7 Michigan | 15 | – | 3 | .833 | 28 | – | 9 | .757 |
| No. 12 Wisconsin | 12 | – | 6 | .667 | 30 | – | 8 | .789 |
| No. 11 Michigan State† | 12 | – | 6 | .667 | 29 | – | 9 | .763 |
| Nebraska | 11 | – | 7 | .611 | 19 | – | 13 | .594 |
| No. 22 Ohio State | 10 | – | 8 | .556 | 25 | – | 10 | .714 |
| Iowa | 9 | – | 9 | .500 | 20 | – | 13 | .606 |
| Minnesota | 8 | – | 10 | .444 | 25 | – | 13 | .658 |
| Illinois | 7 | – | 11 | .389 | 20 | – | 15 | .571 |
| Indiana | 7 | – | 11 | .389 | 17 | – | 15 | .531 |
| Penn State | 6 | – | 12 | .333 | 16 | – | 18 | .471 |
| Northwestern | 6 | – | 12 | .333 | 14 | – | 19 | .424 |
| Purdue | 5 | – | 13 | .278 | 15 | – | 17 | .469 |
† 2014 Big Ten tournament winner Rankings from AP poll

The 2013–14 Michigan Wolverines men's basketball team represented the University of Michigan during the 2013–14 NCAA Division I men's basketball season. The team played its home games in Ann Arbor, Michigan, for the 47th consecutive year at the Crisler Center, with a capacity of 12,707. It was nicknamed "Team 98" in reference to that it was the program's 98th season overall and its 97th consecutive year as a member of the Big Ten Conference. The team was led by seventh-year head coach John Beilein. The team won the 2013–14 Big Ten Conference regular-season championship, for the 14th time in program history and the eighth time outright. It was Beilein's fourth conference championship and his second at Michigan.

Although the 2012–13 team graduated five seniors and had two underclassmen (Trey Burke and Tim Hardaway Jr.) who were first-round draft choices in the 2013 NBA draft from the 2013 NCAA Division I men's basketball tournament national runner-up team, three of the five national runner-up team starters (Mitch McGary, Glenn Robinson III and Nik Stauskas) were returning. The entering class included a pair of state Boys Basketball Gatorade Players of the Year in Indiana Mr. Basketball Zak Irvin and Derrick Walton, runner-up Mr. Basketball of Michigan, three scholarship players and four walk-ons. The team was a top-10 preseason selection, according to the vast majority of preseason rankings, and many media outlets selected McGary as a preseason All-American. Plagued with back problems during the season, McGary played in eight of the team's first eleven games before opting for season-ending surgery.

During the conference portion of the schedule Michigan won its first eight games, including a stretch of three games in which it defeated top-ten opponents in consecutive games (which no Division I team accomplished since the 2006–07 NCAA Division I men's basketball season). Michigan won at Wisconsin for the first time since 1999 and at Ohio State for the first time since 2003. The team defeated the same ranked opponent (Michigan State) twice in the same season for the first time in thirteen years.

The Wolverines were led by 2014 Consensus All-American and Big Ten Conference Men's Basketball Player of the Year Stauskas, a unanimous first-team All-B1G selection. Caris LeVert (B1G 2nd team), Robinson (B1G honorable mention) and Walton (B1G All-Freshman) also earned conference honors, and Beilein was named Coach of the Year by the B1G media.

== Preseason roster changes ==
=== Departures ===
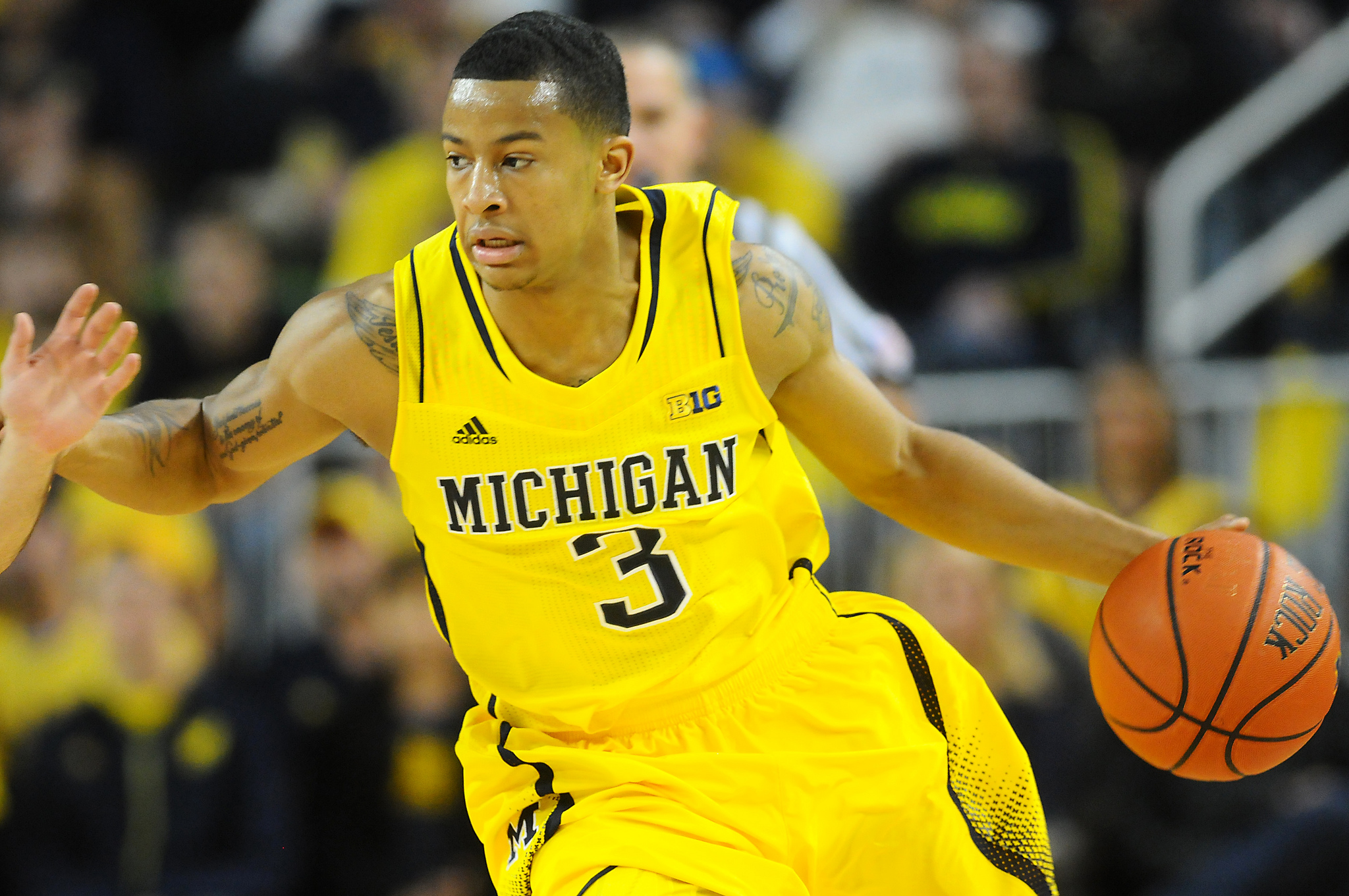
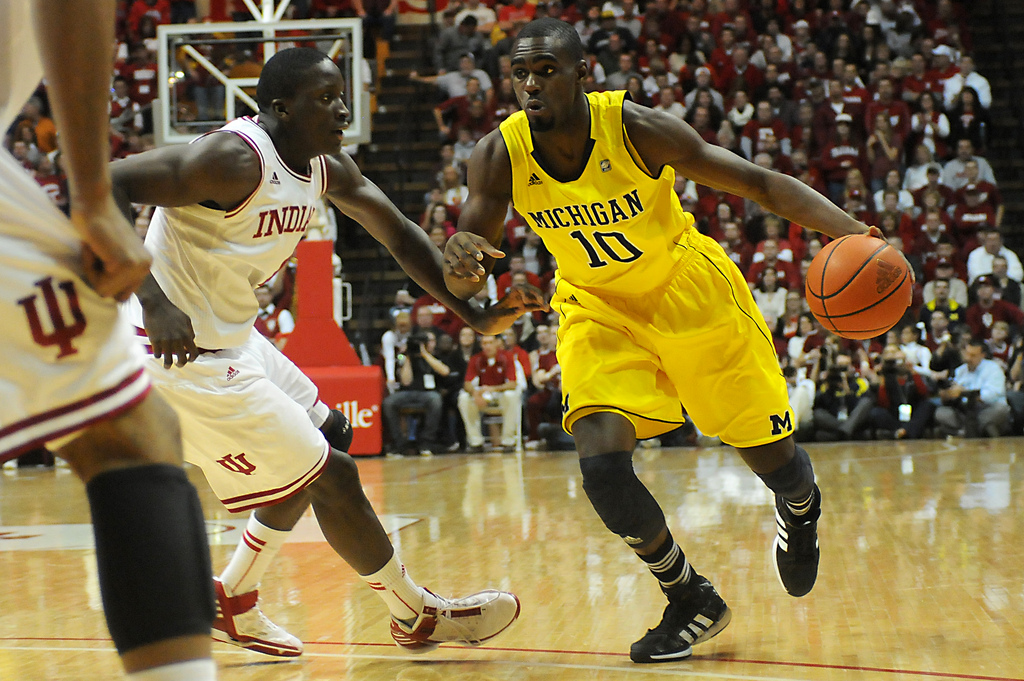
The Wolverines lost Trey Burke (left) and Tim Hardaway Jr. (right, guarded by Victor Oladipo) to the 2013 NBA draft.

The team lost several players from the 2012–13 team. On April 14, 2013, Burke entered the 2013 NBA Draft, and on April 17 Hardaway entered the draft. On April 18, McGary and Robinson decided not to enter. On June 27, 2013, Burke was selected ninth in the 2013 NBA Draft by the Minnesota Timberwolves and traded to the Utah Jazz for the 14th and 21st picks, which were used to select Shabazz Muhammad and Gorgui Dieng. Hardaway was drafted 24th by the New York Knicks. In addition to the NBA draft class, the team had a 5-member senior class of Eso Akunne, Josh Bartelstein, Blake McLimans, Corey Person and Matt Vogrich.

| Name | Number | Pos. | Height | Weight | Year | Hometown | Notes |
|---|---|---|---|---|---|---|---|
| Trey Burke | 3 | PG | 6'0" | 190 pounds (86.2 kg) | Sophomore | Columbus, Ohio | 2013 NBA draft |
| Tim Hardaway Jr. | 10 | SG | 6'6" | 205 pounds (93.0 kg) | Junior | Miami, Florida | 2013 NBA draft |
| Eso Akunne | 5 | PG | 6'2" | 225 pounds (102.1 kg) | Senior | Ann Arbor, Michigan | Graduated |
| Matt Vogrich | 13 | SG | 6'4" | 200 pounds (90.7 kg) | Senior | Lake Forest, Illinois | Graduated |
| Josh Bartelstein | 20 | G | 6'3" | 210 pounds (95.3 kg) | Senior | Highland Park, Illinois | Graduated |
| Blake McLimans | 22 | PF | 6'10" | 240 pounds (108.9 kg) | Senior | Hamburg, New York | Graduated |
| Corey Person | 32 | SF | 6'3" | 210 pounds (95.3 kg) | Redshirt senior | Kalamazoo, Michigan | Graduated |

=== 2013–14 team recruits ===
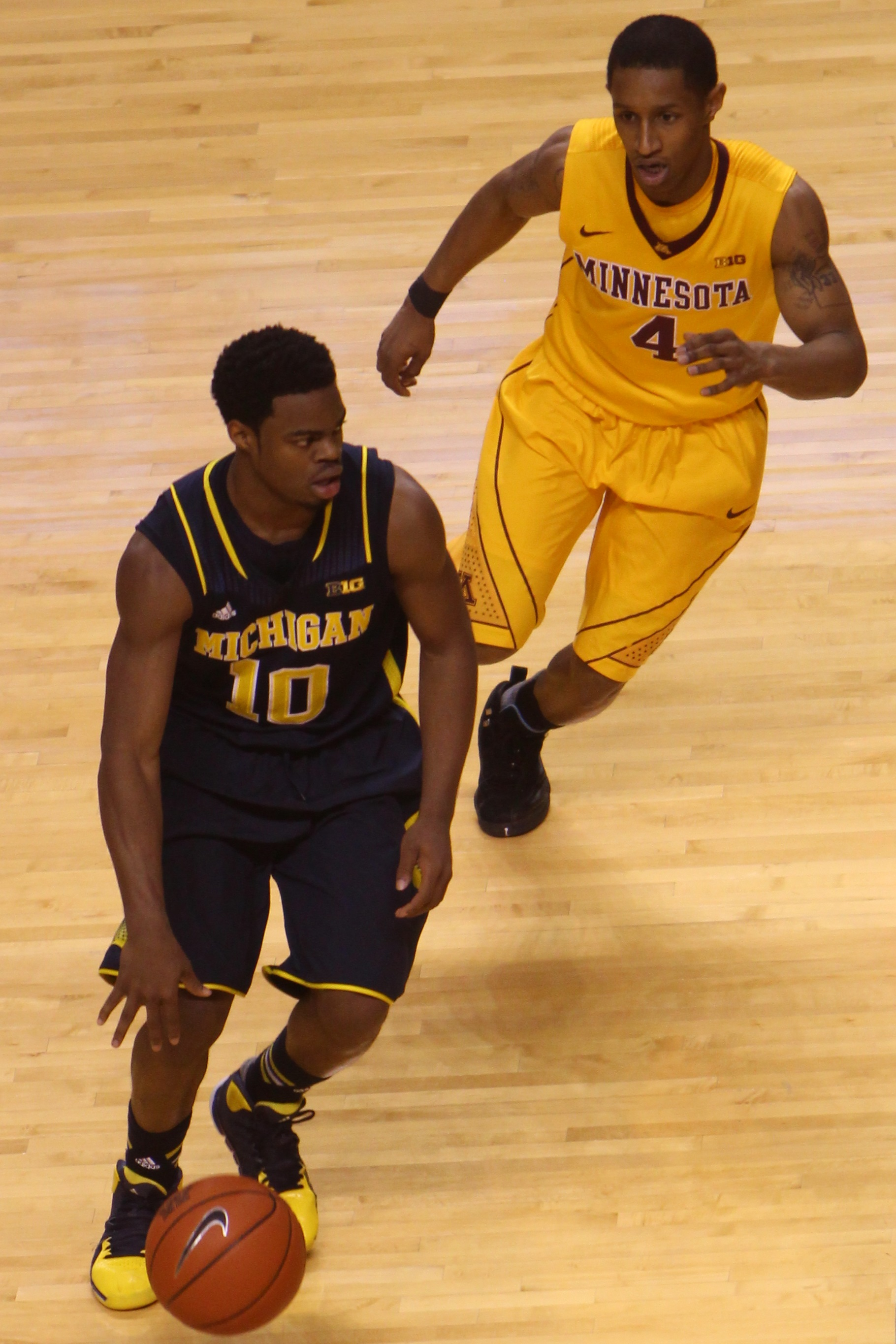
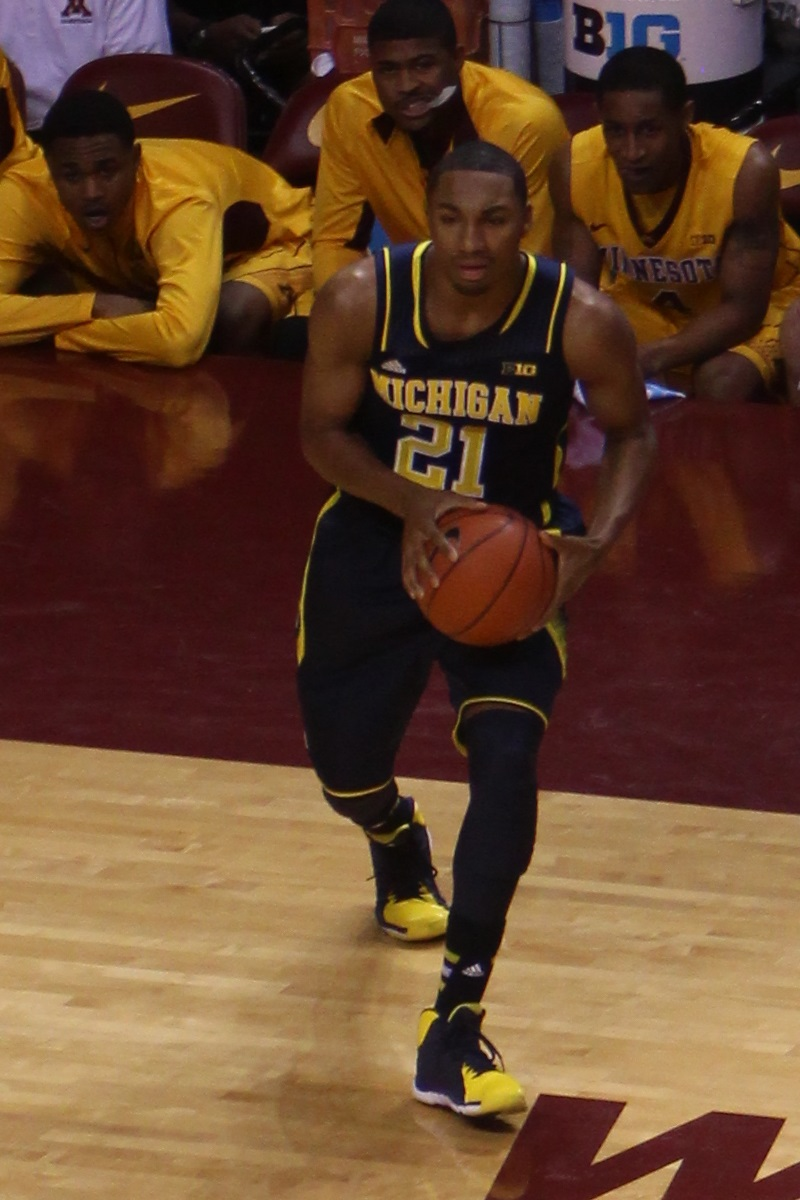
The incoming class included state Boys Basketball Gatorade Players of the Year Derrick Walton (left) and Zak Irvin (right).

On November 16, 2012, Michigan men's basketball received signed National Letters of Intent (NLIs) from 6-foot-9-inch (2.06 m) forward Mark Donnal, 6-foot-6-inch (1.98 m) guard Irvin and 6-foot (1.83 m) guard Derrick Walton Jr. for the 2013–14 academic year. The previous season's roster had five seniors: forward Blake McLimans and guards Eso Akunne, Josh Bartelstein (captain), Corey Person and Matt Vogrichguard. After graduating, McLimans transferred to play a redshirt year with the 2013–14 Miami RedHawks men's basketball team. Donnal is the younger brother of then Iowa Hawkeye and later National Football League offensive lineman Andrew Donnal.

The entering class made great strides during the summer of 2012. Irvin jumped from number 68 to number 31 in the Rivals.com ranking, and Walton jumped from 57 to 44. At the end of August Irvin was rated 21st, 31st and 62nd in the national class of 2013 by ESPN, Rivals.com and Scout.com, respectively; Walton was ranked 32nd, 44th and 43rd, respectively and Donnal was ranked 96th, 104th and 80th. At the end of November 2012, the Michigan entering class of 2013 was ranked 11th, 11th and 15th as a class. When the final Rivals.com class of 2013 rankings were published on April 15, 2013, Irvin, Walton and Donnal were ranked 24th, 37th and 111th, respectively.

Walton was runner-up in the 2013 Mr. Basketball of Michigan by a 2130–2086 margin to Iowa State signee Monte Morris, despite one more first-place vote. Irvin was named 2013 Indiana Mr. Basketball, giving Hamilton Southeastern High School the state's first back-to-back winners from the same high school (the other was Gary Harris). Walton and Irvin were 2013 Parade All-American honorees, and were named state Boys Basketball Gatorade Player of the Year. Walton was expected to assume the starting point-guard role from Burke, ahead of Spike Albrecht. The class originally included Austin Hatch (who made a verbal commitment on June 13, 2011), but he was critically injured in a June 24 plane crash which killed his parents.

On April 29, Andrew Dakich (son of Dan Dakich) committed to Michigan as a walk-on. Dakich and Cole McConnell, another walk-on, joined the incoming class which reported for summer practice on June 22, 2013. On September 13, Sean Lonergan joined the team as a third walk-on. Sophomore Brad Anlauf, who redshirted on the 2012 Michigan Wolverines football team, joined the team after walk-on tryouts.

College recruiting
| Name | Hometown | School | Height | Weight | Commit date |
|---|---|---|---|---|---|
| Derrick Walton; PG | Detroit, MI | Chandler Park Academy | 6 ft 0 in (1.83 m) | 172.5 lb (78.2 kg) | Jan 8, 2011 |
| Derrick Walton; PG | Recruit ratings: Scout: Rivals: (89) | | | | |
| Zak Irvin; SF | Fishers, IN | Hamilton Southeastern High School | 6 ft 5.5 in (1.97 m) | 177.5 lb (80.5 kg) | Jul 31, 2011 |
| Zak Irvin; SF | Recruit ratings: Scout: Rivals: (91) | | | | |
| Mark Donnal; PF | Monclova, OH | Anthony Wayne High School | 6 ft 9 in (2.06 m) | 207.5 lb (94.1 kg) | Jun 23, 2011 |
| Mark Donnal; PF | Recruit ratings: Scout: Rivals: (82) | | | | |
| Andrew Dakich; PG | Zionsville, IN | Zionsville Community High School | 6 ft 2 in (1.88 m) | 160 lb (73 kg) | Apr 29, 2013 |
| Andrew Dakich; PG | Recruit ratings: (59) | | | | |
| Cole McConnell; SG | Atherton, CA | Sacred Heart Prep; New Hampton School | 6 ft 4 in (1.93 m) | 200 lb (91 kg) | Mar 14, 2013 |
| Cole McConnell; SG | Recruit ratings: No ratings found | | | | |
| Sean Lonergan; SF | Fishers, IN | Fishers High School | 6 ft 5 in (1.96 m) | 195 lb (88 kg) | Sep 13, 2011 |
| Sean Lonergan; SF | Recruit ratings: No ratings found | | | | |
| Brad Anlauf; F | Hinsdale, IL | Hinsdale Central High School | 6 ft 4 in (1.93 m) | 195 lb (88 kg) | |
| Brad Anlauf; F | Recruit ratings: No ratings found | | | | |
Overall recruit ranking: Scout: 16 Rivals: 12 ESPN: 12
Note: In many cases, Scout, Rivals, 247Sports, On3, and ESPN may conflict in their listings of height and weight.; In these cases, the average was taken. ESPN grades are on a 100-point scale.; Sources: "Michigan 2013 Basketball Commitments". Rivals.; "2013 Michigan Basketball Commits". Scout.; "ESPN Recruiting Nation Basketball". ESPN.; "Scout.com Team Recruiting Rankings". Scout.; "2013 Team Ranking". Rivals.

== Roster ==
Beilein said that barring injuries, Mark Donnal would spend the season as a redshirt. He did in fact redshirt.

2013–14 Michigan Wolverines men's basketball team
Players
Coaches

| Pos. | # | Name | Height | Weight | Year | Hometown |
|---|---|---|---|---|---|---|
| F | 1 | Glenn Robinson III (C) | 6 ft 7 in (2.01 m) | 220 lb (100 kg) | So | St. John, IN |
| G | 2 | Spike Albrecht | 5 ft 11 in (1.8 m) | 175 lb (79 kg) | So | Crown Point, IN |
| F | 4 | Mitch McGary (injured) | 6 ft 10 in (2.08 m) | 255 lb (116 kg) | So | Chesterton, IN |
| G | 5 | Andrew Dakich (W) | 6 ft 2 in (1.88 m) | 160 lb (73 kg) | Fr | Zionsville, IN |
| G | 10 | Derrick Walton | 6 ft 1 in (1.85 m) | 185 lb (84 kg) | Fr | Harper Woods, MI |
| G | 11 | Nik Stauskas | 6 ft 6 in (1.98 m) | 205 lb (93 kg) | So | Mississauga, ON |
| G | 12 | Cole McConnell (W) | 6 ft 5 in (1.96 m) | 200 lb (91 kg) | Fr | Atherton, CA |
| F | 14 | Brad Anlauf (W) | 6 ft 4 in (1.93 m) | 195 lb (88 kg) | So | Hinsdale, IL |
| F | 15 | Jon Horford (C) | 6 ft 10 in (2.08 m) | 250 lb (113 kg) | RS Jr | Grand Ledge, MI |
| F | 20 | Sean Lonergan (W) | 6 ft 5 in (1.96 m) | 195 lb (88 kg) | Fr | Fishers, IN |
| F | 21 | Zak Irvin | 6 ft 6 in (1.98 m) | 200 lb (91 kg) | Fr | Fishers, IN |
| G | 23 | Caris LeVert | 6 ft 6 in (1.98 m) | 185 lb (84 kg) | So | Pickerington, OH |
| F | 34 | Mark Donnal (redshirt) | 6 ft 9 in (2.06 m) | 230 lb (104 kg) | Fr | Monclova, OH |
| F | 44 | Max Bielfeldt | 6 ft 7 in (2.01 m) | 245 lb (111 kg) | RS So | Peoria, IL |
| C | 52 | Jordan Morgan (C) | 6 ft 8 in (2.03 m) | 250 lb (113 kg) | RS Sr | Detroit, MI |

Head coach

- John Beilein (Wheeling)

Assistant coach(es)

- Jeff Meyer (Taylor)
- LaVall Jordan (Butler)
- Bacari Alexander (Detroit Mercy)

Legend

- (C) Team captain
- (S) Suspended
- (I) Ineligible
- (W) Walk-on
- Injured
- Current redshirt

Roster

== 2014–15 team recruits ==
Ricky Doyle, D. J. Willson and Kameron Chatman signed their National Letters of Intent on November 13, 2013. Hatch signed a NLI on November 14, 2013. He had survived a plane crash that killed his mother and two siblings in 2003 and another days after signing his NLI with Michigan in 2011 which killed his father and stepmother and sat out the 2011–12 and 2012–13 high-school basketball seasons for Canturbury. He moved to Los Angeles, playing as a fifth-year high-school senior at Loyola High School of Los Angeles. On January 8, 2014, he appeared in his first high-school basketball game since the 2011 crash and sank his first three-point shot.

Chatman led Columbia Christian to the Oregon School Activities Association (OSAA) Class 1A championship over Horizon Christian Schools on March 8, 2014. On March 10, he was one of 26 players selected for the April 18, 2014 Jordan Brand Classic.

College recruiting
| Name | Hometown | School | Height | Weight | Commit date |
|---|---|---|---|---|---|
| Austin Hatch; SG | Fort Wayne, IN | Canterbury School (IN) | 6 ft 6 in (1.98 m) | 214 lb (97 kg) | Jun 23, 2011 |
| Austin Hatch; SG | Recruit ratings: Rivals: (57) | | | | |
| Ricky Doyle; PF | Fort Myers, FL | Bishop Verot (FL) | 6 ft 8 in (2.03 m) | 231 lb (105 kg) | Nov 3, 2013 |
| Ricky Doyle; PF | Recruit ratings: Scout: Rivals: (80) | | | | |
| D. J. Wilson; SF/PF | Sacramento, CA | Capital Christian (CA) | 6 ft 8 in (2.03 m) | 210 lb (95 kg) | Jun 10, 2013 |
| D. J. Wilson; SF/PF | Recruit ratings: Scout: Rivals: (73) | | | | |
| Kameron Chatman; SF | Portland, OR | Columbia Christian (OR) | 6 ft 7 in (2.01 m) | 196 lb (89 kg) | Feb 10, 2013 |
| Kameron Chatman; SF | Recruit ratings: Scout: Rivals: (86) | | | | |
Overall recruit ranking:
Note: In many cases, Scout, Rivals, 247Sports, On3, and ESPN may conflict in their listings of height and weight.; In these cases, the average was taken. ESPN grades are on a 100-point scale.; Sources: "Michigan 2014 Basketball Commitments". Rivals.; "2014 Michigan Basketball Commits". Scout.; "ESPN Recruiting Nation Basketball". ESPN.; "Scout.com Team Recruiting Rankings". Scout.; "2014 Team Ranking". Rivals.

== Preseason ==
=== Pre-offseason rankings ===
The earliest preseason predictions were made the day after the 2013 NCAA Division I men's basketball tournament, before final decisions by college players about declaring for the 2013 NBA draft and before many high-school players signed a National Letter of Intent about their 2013 matriculation. With the expectation that most of the talented players from the previous season (Burke, Robinson, Hardaway and McGary) would enter the draft, Michigan was not projected as a ranked team by ESPN. USA Today projected that if one of the four possible 2013 NBA draft entrants returned, Michigan would be ranked 24th; if all returned, Michigan would be the preseason #1.

On April 29, the day after the 2013 NBA draft entry deadline (with McGary and Robinson returning), the team was ranked ninth by ESPN's Jason King and ESPN's Andy Katz. CBSSports.com's staff ranked Michigan as #4. ESPN's Dick Vitale predicted that the team would be a preseason seventh on May 2. The following day, Nicole Auerbach and Scott Gleeson of USA Today projected the Woverines as the seventh-ranked team. On May 30, Sporting News' Mike DeCourcy selected Michigan as number seven.

On April 30, ESPN's Eamonn Brennan named McGary a first-team 2013–14 pre-offseason All-American selection. In June 2013, Sporting News' Mike DeCourcy named McGary and Robinson as the best and fourth-best players at their respective positions (center and small forward) for the upcoming season.

=== Fall press ===
A Big Ten Conference preseason media poll, announced at its October 31 media-day conference, predicted that Michigan would finish second to rival Michigan State (ahead of Ohio State) and selected McGary and Robinson for its preseason All-Big Ten team. A Big Ten Network media poll, announced the day before and providing additional detail, also selected McGary and Robinson for its All-Big Ten Conference team. McGary and Robinson were on the 50-man Naismith Award and Wooden Award preseason watchlists. A poll of Big Ten beat writers also selected Michigan to edge out Ohio State for second place. Michigan began the season ninth in the preseason Coaches' Poll and seventh in the AP Poll.

On September 6 Sporting News named McGary to its preseason first All-American team as the best overall player in the Big Ten Conference, ranking Robinson fifth overall and Irvin and Walton the second- and third-best conference newcomers respectively. It chose Beilein as the conference's third-best coach. The Associated Press made McGary a first-team preseason selection. Sports Illustrated ranked Walton the ninth-best freshman overall and second-best in the Big Ten, behind Noah Vonleh. The Blue Ribbon College Basketball Yearbook named McGary a preseason second-team All-American. Lindy's Sports selected Robinson as the best NBA prospect in the Big Ten, the second-best small forward in the country and named him to the preseason All-Big Ten team with Aaron Craft, Keith Appling, Gary Harris and Adreian Payne. The magazine chose Stauskas and McGary for its second team, naming McGary as the nation's second-best power forward and Stauskas as the nation's tenth-best shooting guard and the Big Ten's best shooter. Athlon Sports selected McGary for its preseason All-American second team, McGary for the preseason All-Big Ten first team and Robinson for the preseason All-Big Ten second team. CBS and NBC Sports selected McGary as a second-team All-American. Although McGary joined McDermott, Smart, Wiggins and Julius Randle on USA Today's preseason All-American first team in its Sports 2013–14 College Basketball Preview Magazine, the paper's sports staff later named him to their second team. Dick Vitale selected McGary and Aaron Craft for his All-Solid Gold preseason first team.

The September 6 Sporting News announcements included a number-seven ranking for Michigan, with concern about Walton's ability to replace national Player of the Year Burke. Later that month the team was ranked eighth by USA Today, and the Blue Ribbon College Basketball Yearbook made Michigan ninth in its preseason poll. Lindy's Sports ranked Michigan its preseason 10th team, and Athlon Sports listed the Wolverines 12th in its preseason ranking. SLAM Magazine made Michigan its preseason ninth selection, and CBS Sports ranked the team 12th in its preseason poll. Sports Illustrated gave Michigan a power ranking of sixth; its college basketball preview edition placed Robinson on one of its four regional covers, ranking the team seventh overall.

=== Practice and exhibition ===
On October 4 Cole McConnell became the Wolverines' official blogger, succeeding Josh Bartelstein. The team held an open practice on October 21, and the University of Michigan hosted its on-campus media-day press conference three days later. On October 31, the Big Ten Conference hosted its media day in Rosemont, Illinois. For the second exhibition game on November 4, against Wayne State at Crisler Center, the Big Ten Network scheduled its first live Student U closed-circuit telecast. During the first week of the season, the team elected Robinson, Jordan Morgan and Jon Horford its captains.

== Schedule ==
=== November ===
Michigan began the regular season on November 8 with a 69–42 victory against UMass Lowell. Several returning players set (or tied) career highs, and six freshmen saw their first action. The game followed a ceremony in which the team raised a banner to the rafters to celebrate its 2013 NCAA tournament regional championship and national runner-up finish. On November 12, against South Carolina State, Michigan opened a 59–23 lead at halftime by making 12 of 19 three-point attempts and won 93–59. Stauskas and LeVert set career highs in points, combining to make 11 of 13 from the three-point line, and Horford added a career-high 15 rebounds. After missing the preseason and first two regular season games, Mitch McGary returned to play against Iowa State on November 17 (posting nine points, six rebounds and four steals) as Michigan lost its first game of the season 77–70. The Wolverines defeated Long Beach State in the first round of the 2013 Puerto Rico Tip-Off on November 21, as Michigan set a tournament record by making 14 three-point shots. The next day (against Florida State in the semifinals), Michigan was behind by 10 points at halftime, 16 points with 17:16 remaining and 63–54 with a few minutes left before winning 82–80 in overtime. In the final four minutes, Michigan used a 1-3-1 zone to force five turnovers during a 13–5 spurt to make up a 64–56 deficit. On November 24, the team lost the championship game to Charlotte on a last second tip-in; although Stauskas was the tournament's MVP, the team fell to 0–2 all-time against Charlotte. During the game, "Caris LeVert missed most of the first half in foul trouble. Glenn Robinson III missed the final 30 minutes with a back injury after taking a tough first-half fall, and Nik Stauskas ...played the final 9½ minutes with a twisted ankle." Leading scorer Stauskas sat out the November 29 game against Coppin State, but with 24 points from freshman Zak Irvin Michigan won 87–45; McGary and Morgan made their first starts of the season. Irvin's performance was recognized on December 2, when he was the Big Ten Conference Freshman of the Week.

=== December ===
On December 3, Michigan played Duke (#10 in the AP Poll and #8 in the Coaches' Poll) at Cameron Indoor Stadium in the ACC–Big Ten Challenge in a rivalry game. Michigan lost, 79–69. The Wolverines defeated Houston Baptist by 54 points on December 7, the widest victory margin of the John Beilein era, tying the 2008–09 and the 2010–11 team records of 16 three-point shots in a game. With the loss to Duke, Michigan, fell out of the AP Poll with the sixth-longest active streak (44 weeks). On December 14, the Wolverines lost to (#1, #1) Arizona 72–70. Arizona gained the lead in the final 24.6 seconds, after Michigan led for most of the game. After the loss, the team fell off the Coaches' Poll. On December 21, Michigan defeated Stanford at the Barclays Center without McGary, who had back trouble. Stauskas had 19 points and four assists, and Robinson had 17 and six rebounds. Irvin posted 12 points (on four of eight three-point shots) and six rebounds, sharing Freshman of the Week honors with Noah Vonleh on December 23. The game was part of a triple-header. McGary announced on December 27 that he would have back surgery. The following day Michigan defeated Holy Cross 88–66, with Robinson posting a career-high 23 points.

=== January ===
In the January 2 Big Ten Conference opener against Minnesota, Michigan won its fifth consecutive game against Minnesota and its fifth consecutive game at the Williams Arena. After winning two games by a combined 50 points last year, Michigan beat Northwestern 74–51 to mark its sixth straight victory over the Wildcats. The team gave Nebraska its first loss in the new Pinnacle Bank Arena on January 9, its first five-game win streak since the 2013 NCAA tournament. By beating Penn State on January 14, Michigan won its first four conference games for the first time since the 2002–03 team won its first six games. In the game Stauskas had a game-high 21 points, a team-high five assists and six rebounds. On January 18 Michigan defeated (#3 AP, #3 Coaches) Wisconsin at the Kohl Center for the first time since the 1998–99 team won on February 27, 1999, against the 1998–99 Badgers, ending an 11-game losing streak at Wisconsin. It was the highest-ranked team to lose to Michigan on the road, surpassing a victory over #5 Duke on December 5, 1964, by the Cazzie Russell-led 1964–65 team. After the win, Michigan returned to the national polls (#21, #T25). On January 21 Stauskas was the Big Ten Conference Player of the Week for the first time, leading the conference in scoring and 20-point games. On January 22 Michigan defeated (#10, #10) Iowa, matching the 6–0 start of the 2002–03 team and the Wolverines' first defeat of consecutive top-10 opponents since the 1996–97 team defeated #10 Duke and #6 Arizona. It was the first time Michigan defeated consecutive top-10 opponents in consecutive games since the 1992–93 team defeated #5 North Carolina and #2 Kansas in December 1992. Stauskas tied his career high of 26 points, with five rebounds and five assists. On January 25, ESPN's College GameDay covered the Michigan-Michigan State rivalry game. With Michigan State on an 11-game winning streak (including seven in conference) and Michigan on an eight-game winning streak (including six in conference), the game was the first time in Big Ten history that two teams met who were 6–0 or better in conference play. Michigan defeated the (#3, #3) Spartans 80–75, with Stauskas and Walton contributing 19 points apiece. It was the first time in school history that the team defeated three consecutive AP Poll top-10 opponents, and the first time since the 2006–07 Florida Gators that any team—and the first time since the 1986–87 Iowa Hawkeyes that a Big Ten team—won three consecutive games against top-10 opponents. It gave the team consecutive road wins against top-five opponents after a 36-game losing streak against them. Michigan's 7–0 Big Ten start was its best since the 1976–77 Wolverines won their first eight games. Stauskas was the Big Ten and CBS Sports National Player of the Week, and Walton was the Big Ten Freshman of the Week on January 27. Stauskas was also named the Oscar Robertson National Player of the Week by the United States Basketball Writers Association (USBWA) on January 28. Michigan extended its winning streak to 10 games, tying its 1976–77 8–0 Big Ten start by beating Purdue. Caris LeVert had his first double-double, with a career-high 11 rebounds.

=== February ===
Michigan began the month with a loss to Indiana on February 2. The team rebounded against Nebraska on February 5 with its largest conference-game victory margin (79–50) under John Beilein and its largest conference-game victory margin since defeating Indiana 112–64 on February 22, 1998. On February 8 the Wolverines played poorly against (#17, #13) Iowa, losing 85–67 and surrendering the most points in a non-overtime game since December 12, 2007 (against Oakland). It was the team's biggest point deficit since its loss to Wisconsin by 18 on February 6, 2010. Michigan then defeated the (#22, 20) Ohio State Buckeyes at Value City Arena, the first Michigan victory at Ohio State since the 2002–03 team defeated the Buckeyes on January 15, 2003, and ending a nine-game losing streak at Ohio State. It was the first road sweep of Michigan State, Ohio State and Wisconsin since 1992–93. On February 16 Michigan lost to (#21, 21) Wisconsin. The Wolverines set a season low on February 23 with three turnovers and no turnover points against (#13, 14) Michigan State, rebounding from an early 22–11 deficit to win 79–70. Stauskas led the way with 25 points on 9-for-13 shooting, with 21 in the second half (including 10 which brought the score from a 48–43 deficit to a 53–51 lead). He had five assists, three rebounds and no fouls, and was Big Ten Player of the Week for the third time on February 24. It was the first time Michigan defeated the same ranked opponent twice in a season since the 2000–01 team defeated the 2000–01 Iowa Hawkeyes twice. The Wolverines (19–7, 11–3 Big Ten) regained first place in the Big Ten race, ahead of Michigan State (22–6, 11–4), gaining control of its destiny for the conference title with four games remaining against teams in the bottom half of the standings averaging five conference wins. On February 26, Michigan defeated Purdue 77–76 with a buzzer beater by Robinson (against his father's alma mater) in overtime. Michigan trailed by 19 (27–8) in the first half and 13 (37–24) at halftime. The 19-point deficit was the largest overcome by the Wolverines that season, raising their overtime record to 13–3 under Beilein (including eight of their last nine and three straight). It was the team's first buzzer beater since DeShawn Sims' on November 29, 2008 against Savannah State.

=== March ===
On March 1, Michigan clinched a share of the Big Ten regular-season championship by defeating Minnesota 66–56. The Wolverines faced an Illinois team on March 4 which had held its previous four opponents under 50 points. Michigan scored 52 points in the first half and went on to win 84–53, tying the school record of 16 three-point shots. Stauskas had 24 points, including a career-high seven three-point shots, as part of a seven-for-nine three-point effort. With the win, Michigan clinched its first outright (unshared) Big Ten Conference championship since 1985–86. It was the team's 14th Big Ten championship, and its eighth outright. Beilein had his fourth career conference championship and his second with Michigan. The Wolverines closed out the season with an 84–80 victory over Indiana which included a season-high 26 free throws. With a team-high 21 points, Stauskas shared his fourth Player of the Week honor with Shavon Shields. The team's 15 conference wins were the most since 1992–93. During conference play, Michigan led the conference in field goal percentage (48.8 percent), free-throw percentage (78.0 percent), rebounds (29.8), scoring margin (6.7), assist-turnover ratio (1.44) and road attendance (15,711).

=== Postseason ===
Michigan entered the 2014 Big Ten Conference men's basketball tournament as the number-one seed for the first time. The Wolverines defeated Illinois 64–63, after losing a 13-point second-half lead and getting a game-winning basket with 7.9 seconds remaining from center Jordan Morgan. Although Michigan led for most of the game, the team only scored six points in the last 7 1/2 minutes. On March 15 the Wolverines defeated (#24, 24) Ohio State 72–69, Michigan's 12th consecutive win in games decided by single digits. The team had a 16-point first-half lead and a 12-point second-half lead before Ohio State took its first lead (61–60) of the game with 7:59 remaining. Michigan finished the game with a 7–1 run in the last 4:12 to win. Morgan set a school record for most games played (137), passing Stu Douglass. Michigan State (#22, 22) won the first postseason game between the state rivals, 69–55, to claim the Big Ten tournament championship.

The Wolverines were seeded number two in the Midwest region of the 2014 NCAA Division I men's basketball tournament. Michigan opened the tournament by defeating Wofford 57–40, the fewest points scored by a Michigan opponent that season, and the victory ensured that the Wolverines would not have consecutive NCAA Tournament losses for the first time since 1993. Michigan then defeated Texas 79–65, advancing to the Sweet 16 for the second straight season. The team's back-to-back trips marked the first time Michigan played in consecutive Sweet 16s since its three straight appearances in 1992–94. Michigan recorded 14 three-pointers in the game, setting a school record in NCAA tournament play and giving Beilein his 700th win. The Wolverines defeated Tennessee 73–71 in the March 28 regional semifinal. Although they led by 15 points in the second half, four turnovers in the last 97 seconds reduced the lead to 72–71 in the final seconds. Michigan set a school record for the most three-point shots in a season (312), breaking the previous record of 305 set in 2008–09. In the March 30 Elite Eight regional final against (RV, #22) Kentucky, Michigan led by ten points in the first half before Kentucky ended the half with a 15–5 run to tie the score at 37. Kentucky took the lead several times in the second half, with Michigan battling back to tie the score at 39, 47 and 51. With Michigan leading 55–51 with 11:31 remaining, Kentucky answered with 11 straight points for its largest lead of the game (forcing Michigan to use a timeout with 6:24 left). With less than 30 seconds left in the game, Michigan tied the game at 72 with a wild scramble (including three offensive Wolverine rebounds) before Kentucky buried a deep three-pointer with 2.3 seconds remaining to win 75–72. Michigan recorded seven three-pointers in the game, bringing the school season record to 319. The Wolverines' 59 wins this season and the previous one set a school record for a two-year period.

=== Results ===
| Date time, TV | Rank^{#} | Opponent^{#} | Result | Record | High points | High rebounds | High assists | Site (attendance) city, state |
Exhibition
| Oct 29*; 7:00 pm | No. 7 | Concordia | W 117–44 | – | 33 – Robinson | 12 – Horford | 10 – LeVert | Crisler Center (12,707); Ann Arbor, MI |
| Nov 4*; 7:00 pm | No. 7 | Wayne State | W 79–60 | – | 17 – Stauskas | 9 – Horford | 4 – Walton, Stauskas | Crisler Center (11,898); Ann Arbor, MI |
Non-conference regular season
| Nov 8*; 7:00 pm | No. 7 | Massachusetts Lowell | W 69–42 | 1–0 | 17 – LeVert (1) | 12 – Horford (1) | 4 – Robinson (1)/Walton (1) | Crisler Center (12,707); Ann Arbor, MI |
| Nov 12*; 7:00 pm | No. 7 | South Carolina State | W 93–59 | 2–0 | 24 – LeVert (2) | 15 – Horford (2) | 5 – Stauskas (1) | Crisler Center (12,707); Ann Arbor, MI |
| Nov 17*; 5:00 pm, ESPN2 | No. 7 | at Iowa State | L 70–77 | 2–1 | 20 – Stauskas (1) | 7 – Robinson (1) | 6 – Stauskas (2) | Hilton Coliseum (14,384); Ames, IA |
| Nov 21*; 5:00 pm, ESPN2 | No. 15 | vs. Long Beach State; Puerto Rico Tip-Off | W 85–61 | 3–1 | 24 – Stauskas (2) | 7 – Walton (1) | 4 – LeVert (1)/Robinson (2) | Coliseo Rubén Rodríguez (4,952); Bayamón, PR |
| Nov 22*; 5:00 pm, ESPN2 | No. 15 | vs. Florida State; Puerto Rico Tip-Off Semifinals | W 82–80 ^{OT} | 4–1 | 26 – Stauskas (3) | 12 – McGary (1) | 6 – Walton (2) | Coliseo Rubén Rodríguez (5,835); Bayamón, PR |
| Nov 24*; 7:15 pm, ESPN2 | No. 15 | vs. Charlotte; Puerto Rico Tip-Off Championship | L 61–63 | 4–2 | 20 – Stauskas (4) | 9 – McGary (2)/Morgan (1) | 4 – Albrecht (1) | Coliseo Rubén Rodríguez (7,642); Bayamón, PR |
| Nov 29*; 3:00 pm, BTN | No. 22 | Coppin State | W 87–45 | 5–2 | 24 – Irvin (1) | 8 – McGary (3) | 7 – Walton (3) | Crisler Center (12,707); Ann Arbor, MI |
| Dec 3*; 9:15 pm, ESPN | No. 22 | at No. 10 Duke; ACC–Big Ten Challenge/Rivalry | L 69–79 | 5–3 | 24 – LeVert (3) | 14 – McGary (4) | 4 – Stauskas (3) | Cameron Indoor Stadium (9,314); Durham, NC |
| Dec 7*; 12:00 pm, BTN | No. 22 | Houston Baptist | W 107–53 | 6–3 | 25 – Stauskas (5) | 9 – McGary (5) | 6 – Albrecht (2)/McGary (1) | Crisler Center (12,579); Ann Arbor, MI |
| Dec 14*; 12:00 pm, CBS | | No. 1 Arizona | L 70–72 | 6–4 | 20 – Robinson (1) | 6 – Stauskas (1) | 4 – Albrecht (3) | Crisler Center (12,707); Ann Arbor, MI |
| Dec 21*; 8:30 pm, FS1 | | vs. Stanford; Brooklyn Hoops Holiday Invitational | W 68–65 | 7–4 | 19 – Stauskas (6) | 6 – Irvin (1)/Robinson (2) | 5 – LeVert (2) | Barclays Center (11,039); Brooklyn, NY |
| December 28*; 6:30 pm, BTN | | Holy Cross | W 88–66 | 8–4 | 23 – Robinson (2) | 7 – LeVert (1) | 4 – Stauskas (4)/Walton (4) | Crisler Center (12,707); Ann Arbor, MI |
Big Ten regular season
| Jan 2; 7:00 pm, BTN | | at Minnesota | W 63–60 | 9–4 (1–0) | 15 – Irvin (2) | 9 – Horford (3) | 7 – Stauskas (5) | Williams Arena (12,225); Minneapolis, MN |
| Jan 5; 12:00 pm, BTN | | Northwestern | W 74–51 | 10–4 (2–0) | 18 – Stauskas (7) | 8 – Horford (4)/Morgan (2) | 4 – Albrecht (4)/Stauskas (6) | Crisler Center (12,707); Ann Arbor, MI |
| Jan 9; 9:00 pm, ESPN2 | | at Nebraska | W 71–70 | 11–4 (3–0) | 19 – Robinson (3) | 4 – Morgan (3)/Robinson (3) | 5 – LeVert (3) | Pinnacle Bank Arena (15,012); Lincoln, NE |
| Jan 14; 8:00 pm, BTN | | Penn State | W 80–67 | 12–4 (4–0) | 21 – Stauskas (8) | 7 – Horford (5) | 5 – LeVert (4)/Stauskas (7) | Crisler Center (12,707); Ann Arbor, MI |
| Jan 18; 6:00 pm, ESPN | | at No. 3 Wisconsin | W 77–70 | 13–4 (5–0) | 23 – Stauskas (9) | 8 – Morgan (4) | 4 – LeVert (5)/Stauskas (8) | Kohl Center (17,249); Madison, WI |
| Jan 22; 7:00 pm, BTN | No. 21 | No. 10 Iowa | W 75–67 | 14–4 (6–0) | 26 – Stauskas (10) | 9 – Robinson (4) | 7 – Albrecht (5) | Crisler Center (12,707); Ann Arbor, MI |
| Jan 25; 7:00 pm, ESPN | No. 21 | at No. 3 Michigan State; College GameDay/Rivalry | W 80–75 | 15–4 (7–0) | 19 – Stauskas (11)/Walton (1) | 8 – LeVert (2) | 4 – Stauskas (9)/Walton (5) | Breslin Center (14,797); East Lansing, MI |
| Jan 30; 9:00 pm, ESPN | No. 10 | Purdue | W 75–66 | 16–4 (8–0) | 16 – Stauskas (12) | 11 – LeVert (3) | 3 – Stauskas (6)/Walton (10) | Crisler Center (12,707); Ann Arbor, MI |
| Feb 2; 1:00 pm, CBS | No. 10 | at Indiana | L 52–63 | 16–5 (8–1) | 13 – Walton (2) | 10 – Morgan (5) | 3 – LeVert (6) | Assembly Hall (17,472); Bloomington, IN |
| Feb 5; 6:30 pm, BTN | No. 10 | Nebraska | W 79–50 | 17–5 (9–1) | 23 – Robinson (4) | 7 – LeVert (4) | 8 – Stauskas (7) | Crisler Center (12,707); Ann Arbor, MI |
| Feb 8; 2:00 pm, ESPN | No. 10 | at No. 17 Iowa | L 67–85 | 17–6 (9–2) | 22 – LeVert (4) | 7 – Horford (6) | 6 – Walton (11) | Carver Hawkeye Arena (15,400); Iowa City, IA |
| Feb 11; 9:00 pm, ESPN | No. 15 | at No. 22 Ohio State; Rivalry | W 70–60 | 18–6 (10–2) | 15 – Stauskas (13) | 10 – Walton (2) | 6 – Walton (12) | Value City Arena (18,809); Columbus, OH |
| Feb 16; 1:00 pm, CBS | No. 15 | No. 21 Wisconsin | L 62–75 | 18–7 (10–3) | 25 – LeVert (5) | 6 – Horford (7)/LeVert (5) | 2 – Stauskas (8)/Morgan (1) | Crisler Center (12,707); Ann Arbor, MI |
| Feb 23; 12:00 pm, CBS | No. 20 | No. 13 Michigan State; Rivalry | W 79–70 | 19–7 (11–3) | 25 – Stauskas (14) | 5 – Robinson (5) | 5 – Stauskas (9) | Crisler Center (12,707); Ann Arbor, MI |
| Feb 26; 7:00 pm, BTN | No. 16 | at Purdue | W 77–76 ^{OT} | 20–7 (12–3) | 17 – Robinson (5) | 9 – Morgan (6) | 4 – Albrecht (6)/LeVert (7) | Mackey Arena (13,821); West Lafayette, IN |
| Mar 1; 6:00 pm, BTN | No. 16 | Minnesota | W 66–56 | 21–7 (13–3) | 21 – Stauskas (15) | 10 – Morgan (7) | 5 – LeVert (8) | Crisler Center (12,707); Ann Arbor, MI |
| Mar 4; 6:00 pm, ESPN | No. 12 | at Illinois | W 84–53 | 22–7 (14–3) | 24 – Stauskas (16) | 10 – Horford (8) | 5 – Walton (13) | State Farm Center (16,618); Champaign, IL |
| Mar 8; 6:00 pm, ESPN | No. 12 | Indiana | W 84–80 | 23–7 (15–3) | 21 – Stauskas (17) | 10 – Morgan (8) | 4 – Walton (14) | Crisler Center (12,707); Ann Arbor, MI |
Big Ten tournament
| Mar 14; 12:00 pm, ESPN | No. 8T (1) | vs. Illinois (9); Quarterfinals | W 64–63 | 24–7 | 19 – Stauskas (18) | 7 – Robinson (6) | 4 – LeVert (9) | Bankers Life Fieldhouse (18,596); Indianapolis, IN |
| Mar 15; 1:40 pm, CBS | No. 8T (1) | vs. No. 24 Ohio State (5); Semifinals/Rivalry | W 72–69 | 25–7 | 18 – Stauskas (19) | 8 – LeVert (6) | 4 – Walton (15) | Bankers Life Fieldhouse (18,626); Indianapolis, IN |
| Mar 16; 3:30 pm, CBS | No. 8T (1) | vs. No. 22 Michigan State (3); Championship/Rivalry | L 55–69 | 25–8 | 17 – Stauskas (20) | 6 – Morgan (9) | 4 – LeVert (10) | Bankers Life Fieldhouse (18,582); Indianapolis, IN |
NCAA tournament
| Mar 20*; 7:10 pm, CBS | No. 7 (MW 2) | vs. (MW 15) Wofford; Second round | W 57–40 | 26–8 | 15 – Stauskas (21) | 10 – Morgan (10) | 5 – Walton (16) | BMO Harris Bradley Center (17,331); Milwaukee, WI |
| Mar 22*; 5:15 pm, CBS | No. 7 (MW 2) | vs. (MW 7) Texas; Third round | W 79–65 | 27–8 | 17 – Stauskas (22) | 10 – Morgan (11) | 8 – Stauskas (10) | BMO Harris Bradley Center (18,206); Milwaukee, WI |
| Mar 28*; 7:15 pm, CBS | No. 7 (MW 2) | vs. (MW 11) Tennessee; Sweet Sixteen | W 73–71 | 28–8 | 15 – Morgan (1) | 7 – Morgan (12) | 5 – LeVert (11) | Lucas Oil Stadium (41,072); Indianapolis, IN |
| Mar 30*; 5:05 pm, CBS | No. 7 (MW 2) | vs. (MW 8) Kentucky; Elite Eight | L 72–75 | 28–9 | 24 – Stauskas (23) | 4 – Morgan (13)/Robinson (7) | 5 – LeVert (12) | Lucas Oil Stadium (35,551); Indianapolis, IN |
*Non-conference game. ^{#}Rankings from AP Poll, (#) during NCAA Tournament is seed within region, MW=Midwest. (#) Tournament seedings in parentheses. All times are in Eastern Time.

== Statistics ==
The team posted the following statistics:

Legend
| GP | Games played | GS | Games started | MPG | Minutes per game |
| FG% | Field goal percentage | 3P% | 3-point field goal percentage | FT% | Free throw percentage |
| RPG | Rebounds per game | APG | Assists per game | SPG | Steals per game |
| BPG | Blocks per game | PPG | Points per game | **Bold** | Career high |

| **Name** | **GP** | **GS** | **Min.** | **MPG** | **FG** | **FGA** | **FG%** | **3FG** | **3FGA** | **3P%** | **FT** | **FTA** | **FT%** | **OR** | **DR** | **RB** | **RPG** | **Ast.** | **APG** | **PF** | **DQ** | **TO** | **Stl.** | **Blk.** | **Pts.** | **PPG** |
| Nik Stauskas | 36 | 36 | 1,281 | 35.6 | 185 | 394 | 0.470 | 92 | 208 | 0.442 | 168 | 204 | 0.824 | 15 | 90 | 105 | 2.9 | 118 | 3.3 | 47 | 0 | 67 | 20 | 11 | 630 | 17.5 |
| Glenn Robinson III | 37 | 37 | 1,194 | 32.3 | 182 | 373 | 0.488 | 33 | 108 | 0.306 | 87 | 115 | 0.757 | 54 | 110 | 164 | 4.4 | 44 | 1.2 | 55 | 1 | 46 | 35 | 11 | 484 | 13.1 |
| Caris LeVert | 37 | 37 | 1,258 | 34.0 | 163 | 371 | 0.439 | 60 | 147 | 0.408 | 92 | 120 | 0.767 | 19 | 141 | 160 | 4.3 | 109 | 2.9 | 63 | 0 | 62 | 44 | 10 | 478 | 12.9 |
| Derrick Walton | 37 | 36 | 989 | 26.7 | 91 | 212 | 0.429 | 43 | 105 | 0.410 | 69 | 87 | 0.793 | 14 | 98 | 112 | 3.0 | 106 | 2.9 | 63 | 0 | 56 | 21 | 1 | 294 | 7.9 |
| Zak Irvin | 37 | 0 | 569 | 15.4 | 85 | 196 | 0.434 | 62 | 146 | 0.425 | 15 | 21 | 0.714 | 14 | 35 | 49 | 1.3 | 13 | 0.4 | 35 | 0 | 16 | 9 | 3 | 247 | 6.7 |
| Jordan Morgan | 37 | 27 | 743 | 20.1 | 98 | 140 | 0.700 | 0 | 0 | — | 39 | 62 | 0.629 | 72 | 113 | 185 | 5.0 | 22 | 0.6 | 95 | 3 | 32 | 16 | 16 | 235 | 6.4 |
| Jon Horford | 37 | 7 | 512 | 13.8 | 62 | 110 | 0.564 | 0 | 2 | 0.00 | 17 | 26 | 0.654 | 49 | 105 | 154 | 4.2 | 19 | 0.5 | 75 | 2 | 19 | 10 | 26 | 141 | 3.8 |
| Spike Albrecht | 37 | 1 | 545 | 14.7 | 38 | 94 | 0.404 | 24 | 62 | 0.387 | 21 | 27 | 0.778 | 6 | 35 | 41 | 1.1 | 75 | 2.0 | 47 | 0 | 16 | 18 | 1 | 121 | 3.3 |
| Mitch McGary | 8 | 4 | 197 | 24.6 | 30 | 55 | 0.545 | 0 | 2 | 0.00 | 16 | 24 | 0.667 | 23 | 43 | 66 | 8.2 | 12 | 1.5 | 25 | 0 | 13 | 15 | 6 | 76 | 9.5 |
| Max Bielfeldt | 19 | 0 | 89 | 4.7 | 6 | 21 | 0.286 | 3 | 9 | 0.333 | 0 | 1 | 0.000 | 8 | 12 | 20 | 1.1 | 0 | 0.0 | 14 | 0 | 2 | 2 | 2 | 15 | 0.8 |
| Sean Lonergan | 11 | 0 | 23 | 2.1 | 2 | 5 | 0.400 | 0 | 1 | 0.000 | 2 | 2 | 1.000 | 2 | 2 | 4 | 0.4 | 1 | 0.1 | 0 | 0 | 2 | 1 | 1 | 6 | 0.5 |
| Cole McConnell | 4 | 0 | 10 | 2.5 | 1 | 3 | 0.333 | 1 | 3 | 0.333 | 1 | 2 | 0.500 | 0 | 1 | 1 | 0.2 | 0 | 0.0 | 1 | 0 | 0 | 0 | 0 | 4 | 1.0 |
| Andrew Dakich | 12 | 0 | 24 | 2.0 | 1 | 4 | 0.250 | 1 | 1 | 1.000 | 0 | 0 | — | 1 | 3 | 4 | 0.3 | 5 | 0.4 | 3 | 0 | 2 | 0 | 0 | 3 | 0.2 |
| Brad Anlauf | 8 | 0 | 16 | 2.0 | 1 | 4 | 0.250 | 0 | 0 | — | 0 | 0 | — | 0 | 2 | 2 | 0.2 | 1 | 0.1 | 2 | 0 | 1 | 0 | 0 | 2 | 0.2 |
| TEAM | 37 | | | | | | | | | | | | | 52 | 41 | 93 | 2.6 | | | 1 | | 11 | | | | |
| Season Total | 37 | — | — | — | 945 | 1,982 | 0.477 | 319 | 794 | 0.402 | 527 | 691 | 0.763 | 329 | 831 | 1,160 | 31.4 | 525 | 14.2 | 526 | 6 | 345 | 191 | 88 | 2,736 | 73.9 |
| Opponents | 37 | — | — | — | 905 | 2,035 | 0.445 | 201 | 632 | 0.318 | 397 | 543 | 0.731 | 364 | 790 | 1,154 | 31.2 | 437 | 11.8 | 626 | — | 398 | 181 | 100 | 2,408 | 65.1 |

== Honors ==
During the season, the team earned recognition from the Big Ten conference for player and freshman of the week as well as watchlist recognition by various committees. Following the season, both the conference and various media outlets continued to confer accolades on the team.

=== Players of the Week ===
During the regular conference season, the Big Ten named one or two Players of the Week and one or two Freshmen of the Week each Monday (except Martin Luther King Day, when the awards were delayed until Tuesday).

| Week | Player of the Week | Freshman of the Week |
|---|---|---|
| December 2, 2013 | | Zak Irvin |
| December 23, 2013 | | Zak Irvin (2) |
| January 21, 2014 | Nik Stauskas | |
| January 27, 2014 | Nik Stauskas (2) | Derrick Walton |
| February 24, 2014 | Nik Stauskas (3) | |
| March 10, 2014 | Nik Stauskas (4) | |

Stauskas also received National Player of the Week recognition from CBS Sports on January 27 and Oscar Robertson National Player of the Week recognition from the USBWA on January 28.

=== Inseason honors ===
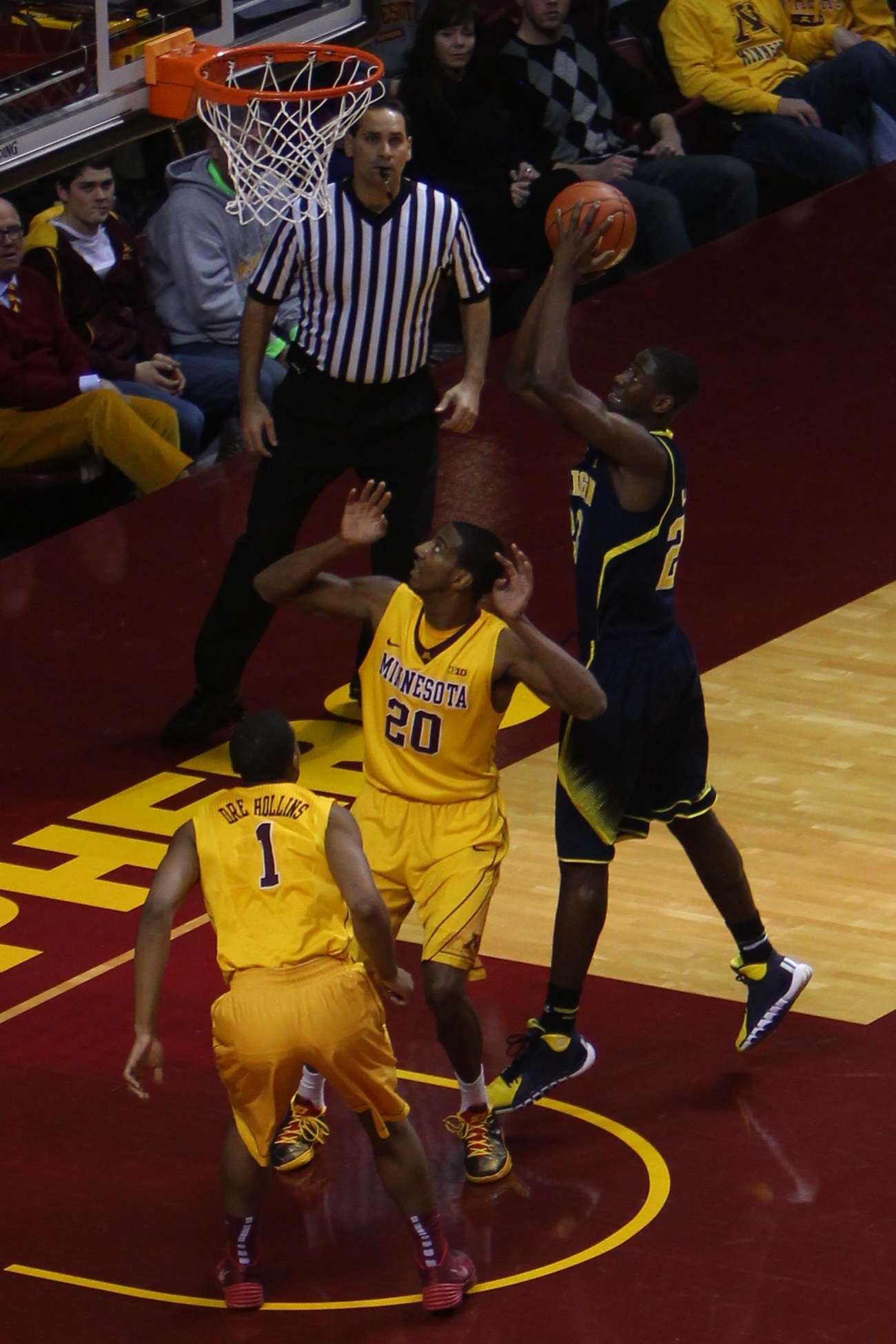
Caris LeVert was an All-Big Ten honoree.

Stauskas was one of four Big Ten players (with Keith Appling, Gary Harris and Roy Devyn Marble) named to the 30-man Naismith College Player of the Year midseason watchlist, and John Beilein was one of ten finalists for the United States Basketball Writers Association's Henry Iba National Coach of the Year Award. Stauskas and Harris were two of 15 finalists for the John R. Wooden Award.

=== Postseason honors ===
Following the season, Stauskas was the Big Ten Conference Men's Basketball Player of the Year and a unanimous first-team All-Big Ten selection by coaches and the media, becoming Michigan's fifth (and its second consecutive) B1G Player of the Year. Caris LeVert was a second-team All-B1G selection, and Glenn Robinson III received an honorable mention from coaches and the media. Derrick Walton was an All-Freshman selection by the coaches, and Beilein was named Big Ten Coach of the Year by the media. On March 11 Stauskas was named District V (Ohio, Indiana, Illinois, Michigan, Minnesota and Wisconsin) Player of the Year, Beilein was named District V Coach of the Year and LeVert was named to the All-District V team by the USBWA. Stauskas was listed on the National Association of Basketball Coaches Division I All-District 7 first team on March 12 and USA Today's All-American third team, was named to the 2014 Big Ten All-Tournament Team and was a first-team All-American selection by the National Association of Basketball Coaches (NABC). Brad Anlauf and Jordan Morgan received Academic All-Big Ten recognition. Stauskas was a second-team 2014 NCAA Men's Basketball All-American selection by Sports Illustrated Sporting News, and Bleacher Report, and a third-team selection by NBC Sports. When he was named a second-team All-American by the Associated Press he became a consensus All-American, and was named to the Wooden All-American team. Beilein was also a finalist for the Naismith College Coach of the Year and Jim Phelan Awards.

=== Records ===
The team and its players set several school records during the season:

Team

- Single-season three-pointers (319)
- Consecutive-season combined wins (59)
- Turnovers per game

Nik Stauskas

- Sophomore season career total three-pointers (172)

Jordan Morgan

- Career games played (142)
- Career field-goal percentage (419 of 664, 63.1 percent)
- Single-season field-goal percentage (98 of 140, 70 percent)

== Rankings ==
Michigan began the season ninth in the Coaches' Poll and seventh in the AP Poll.

Ranking movements Legend: ██ Increase in ranking ██ Decrease in ranking RV = Received votes т = Tied with team above or below
| | Week | | | | | | | | | | | | | | | | | | | | |
| Poll | Pre | 1 | 2 | 3 | 4 | 5 | 6 | 7 | 8 | 9 | 10 | 11 | 12 | 13 | 14 | 15 | 16 | 17 | 18 | 19 | Final |
|---|---|---|---|---|---|---|---|---|---|---|---|---|---|---|---|---|---|---|---|---|---|
| AP | 7 | 7 | 14T | 22 | 22 | RV | RV | RV | RV | RV | RV | 21 | 10 | 10 | 15 | 20 | 16 | 12 | 8T | 7 | Not released |
| Coaches' | 9 | 8 | 13 | 20 | 21 | 25 | RV | RV | RV | RV | RV | 25T | 14 | 16 | 18 | 20 | 16 | 12 | 9 | 8 | 6 |

== Postseason departures ==
=== NBA draft considerations ===
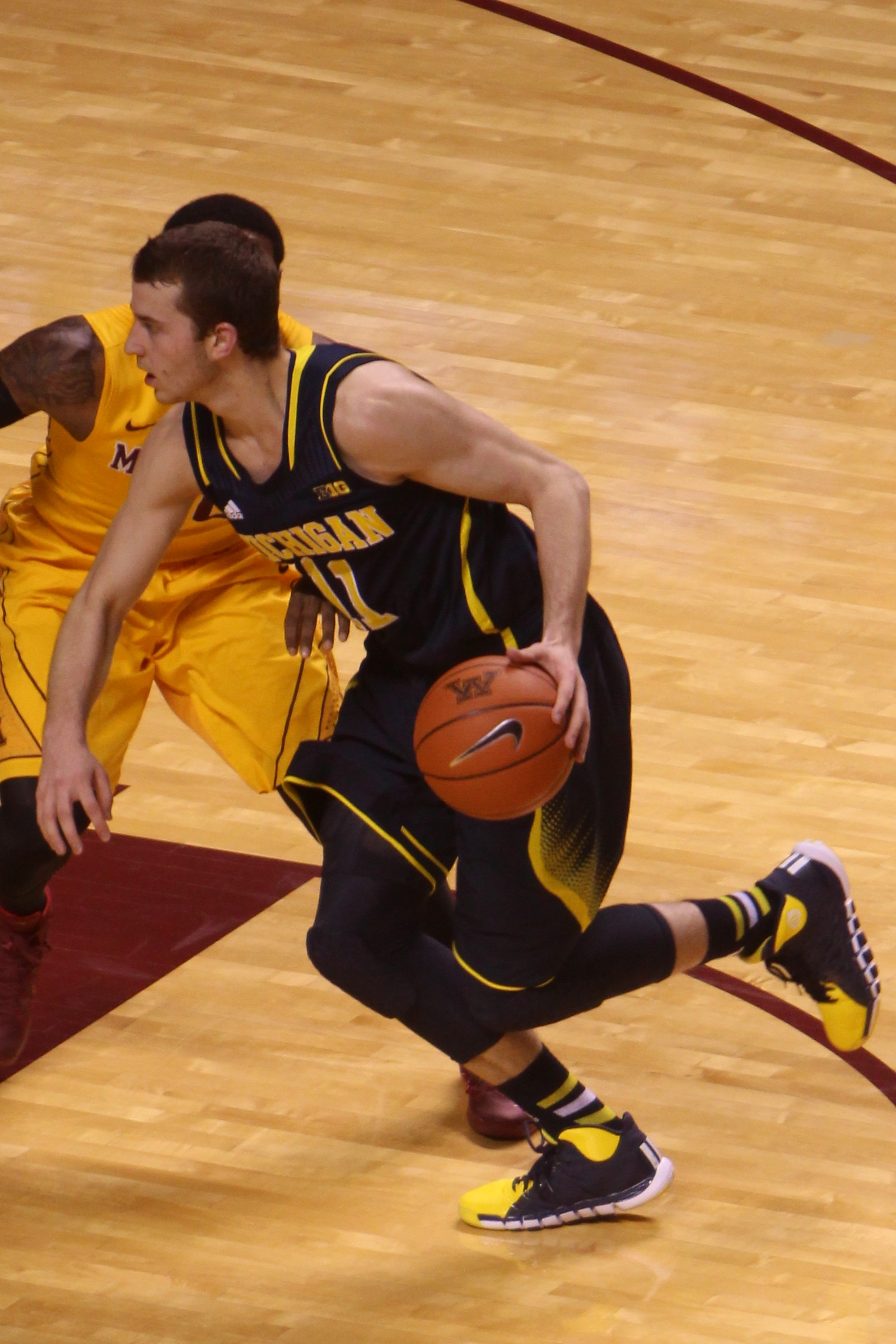
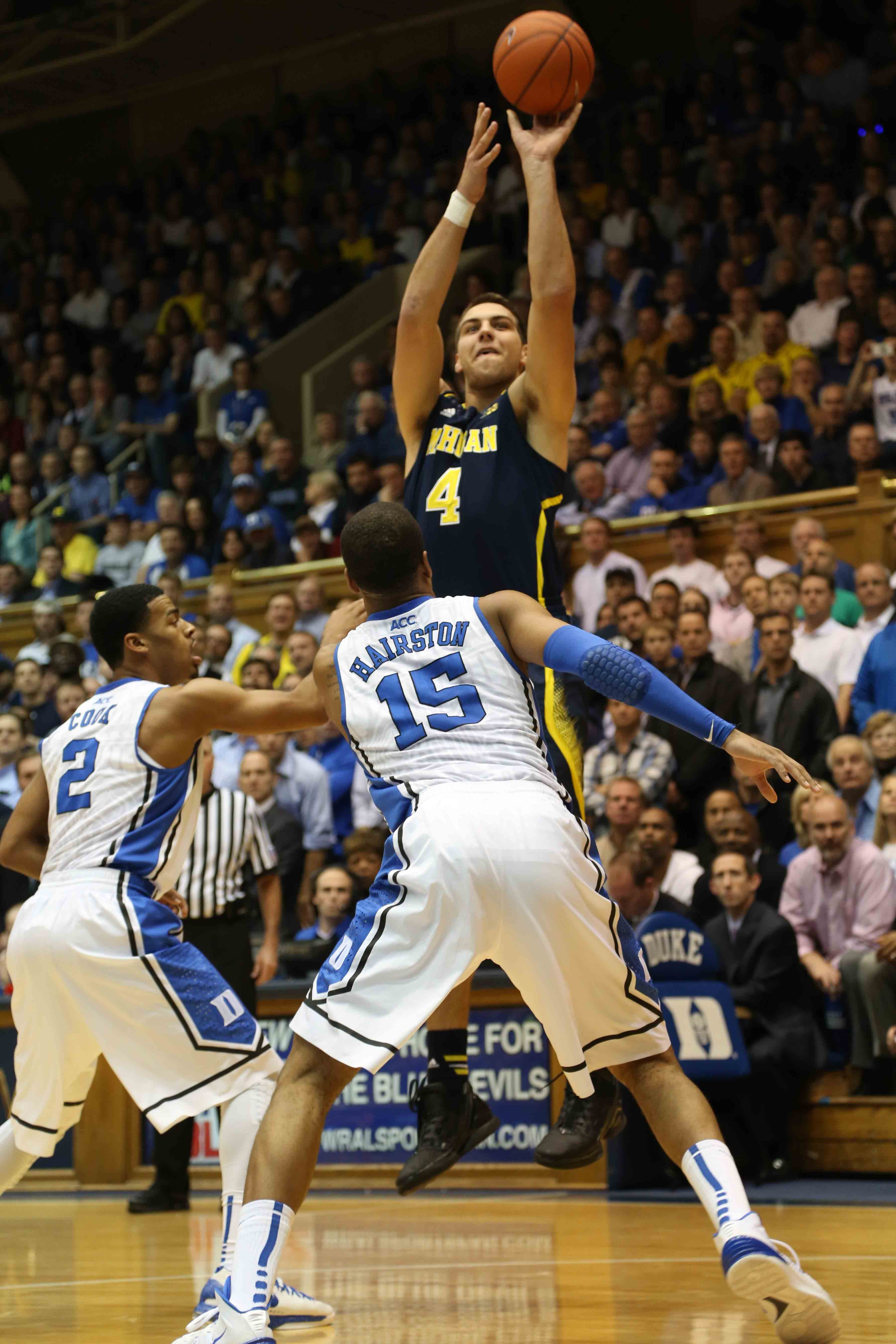
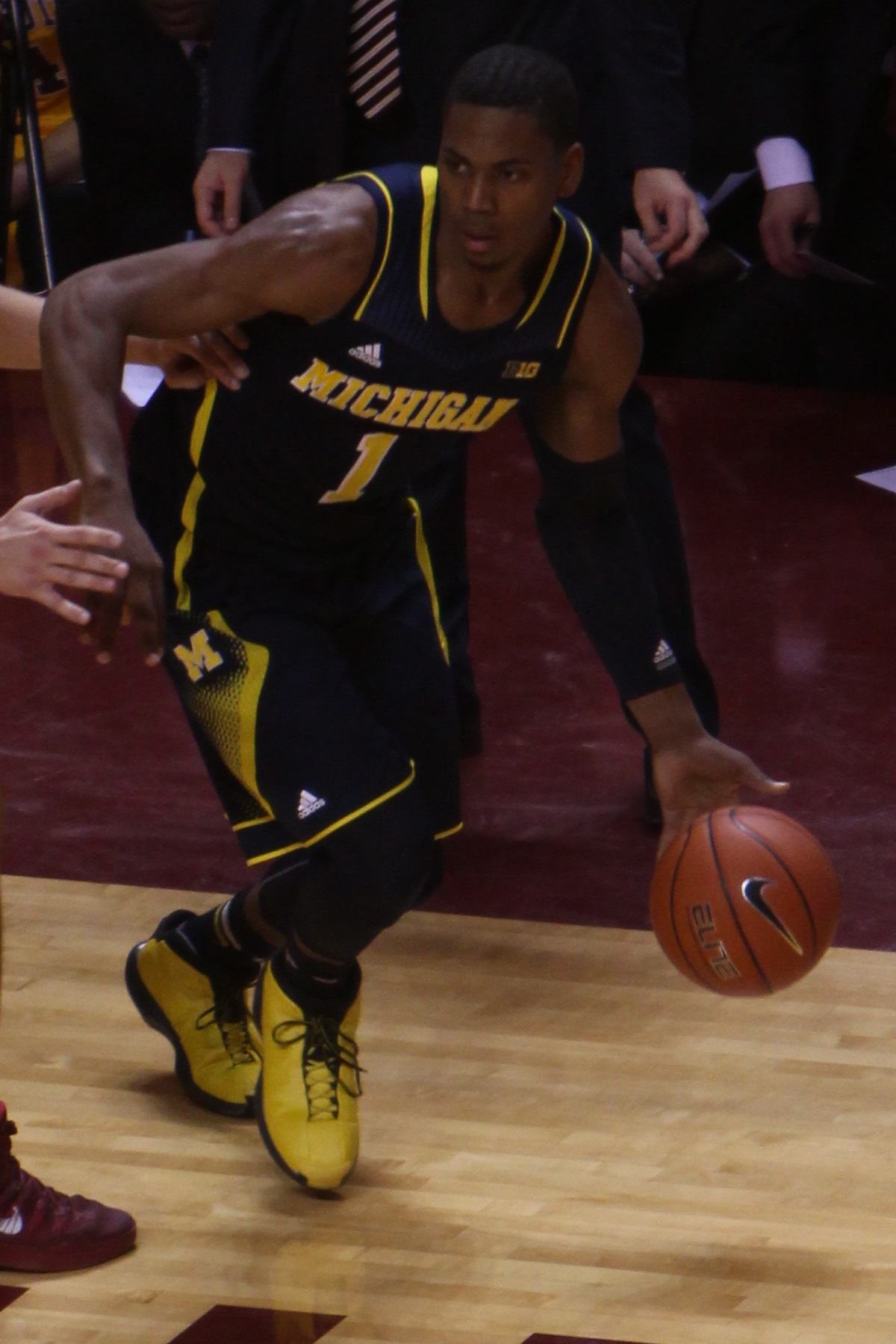
Nik Stauskas, Mitch McGary and Glenn Robinson III (left to right) were selected 8th, 21st and 40th, respectively, in the 2014 NBA draft.

Talks about the 2014 NBA draft began awkwardly when Paul Stauskas told Sports Illustrated about his son, Nik: "He knows all he has to do is keep his nose to the grindstone for another couple of months, and there's a really good possibility he might be able to go pro." Several days later Stauskas tried to distance himself from his father's statement, apologizing to his fans. After the season Stauskas, Robinson and McGary said that they were considering entering the draft, but had not made a decision. Each submitted evaluation requests to the NBA Undergraduate Advisory Committee, which was required to respond by April 14 (giving the players until April 27 to declare their eligibility). On April 10 it was reported that Stauskas had decided to turn pro, but he denied he had made a decision. The reports were based on rumors that Stauskas had decided to hire Mark Bartelstein (father of former Michigan teammate Josh Bartelstein and agent for former teammate Tim Hardaway Jr.) as his agent. In an April 15 joint press conference on the Big Ten Network, Robinson and Stauskas announced that they were declaring their eligibility for the NBA draft. When he learned that he had tested positive for marijuana after the Sweet Sixteen victory over Tennessee and was facing a one-year suspension, McGary also entered the draft.

=== NBA draft selections ===
With Burke and Hardaway's 2013 selection, by the end of the 2014 NBA draft every player who started in the 2013 NCAA Men's Division I Basketball Championship Game was drafted by the NBA in 2013 or 2014. The three 2014 selections (Stauskas, McGary and Robinson) contributed to one of the best Big Ten draft classes in some time; of the seven athletes selected, five were first-round picks. That was the most first-rounders since 1990 and the most overall since 2000, when eight players were selected.

=== Postseason departures ===
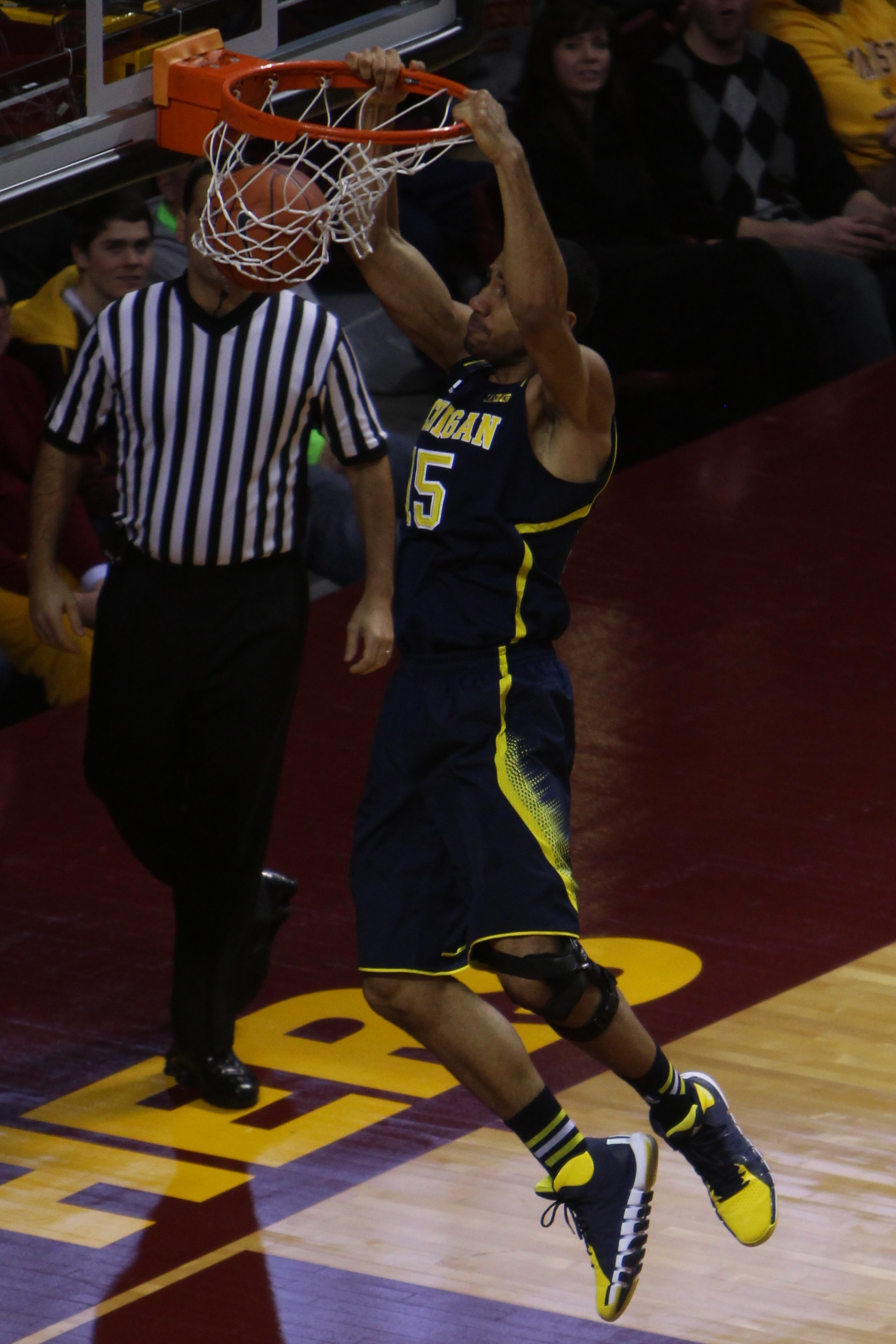
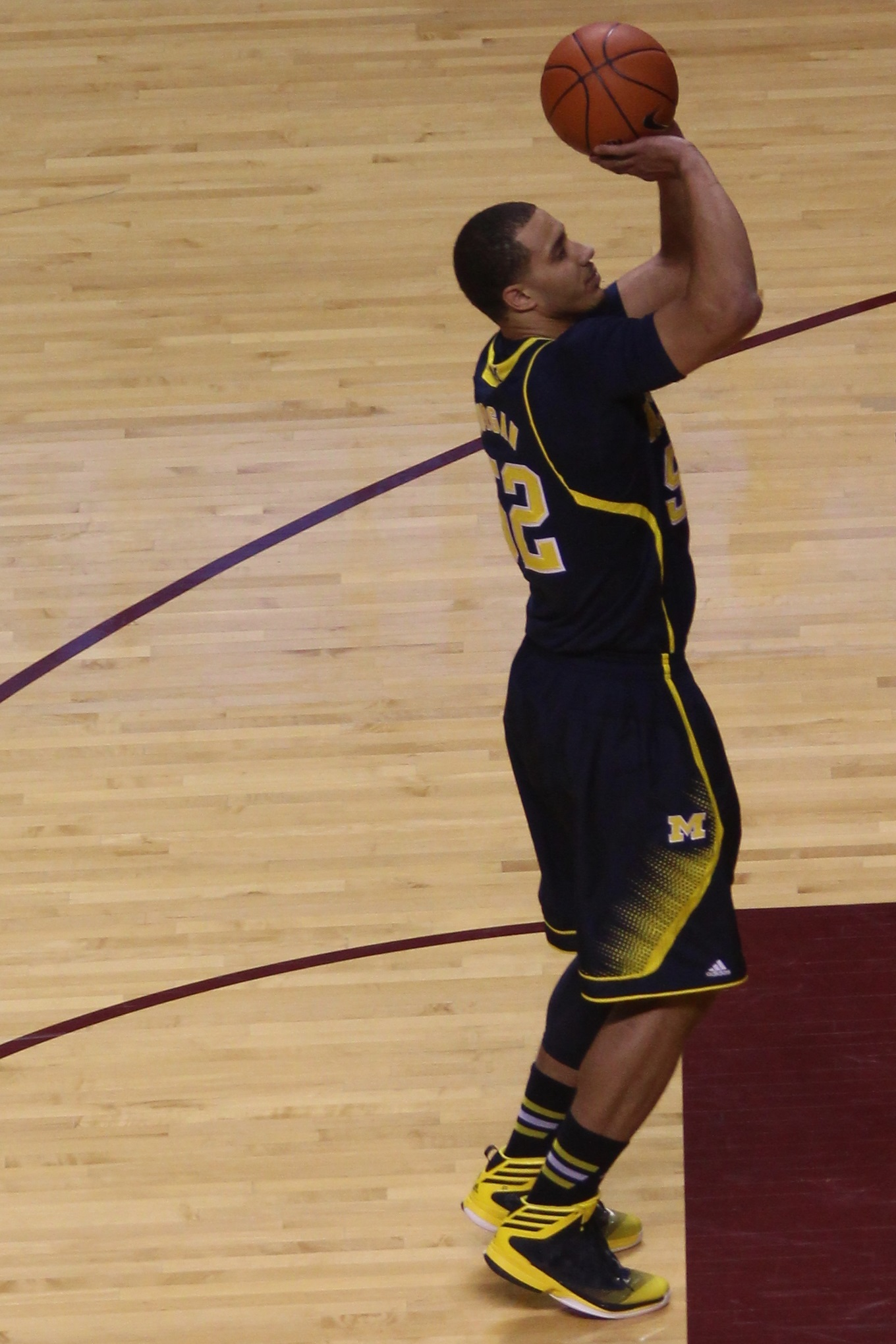
Jon Horford (left) and Jordan Morgan (right) graduated from the program.

Jon Horford announced on April 10 that he would use his year of redshirt eligibility by transferring to a graduate program at another school. By graduating, he became immediately eligible to join another team for the 2014–15 NCAA Division I men's basketball season. On April 26, Horford announced that he would play for the Florida Gators men's basketball team. Jordan Morgan graduated after using all his eligibility, signing as an undrafted free agent to play with the Minnesota Timberwolves in the July 2014 NBA Summer League.

=== Team players drafted into the NBA ===
| Year | Round | Pick | Overall | Player | NBA club |
| 2014 | 1 | 8 | 8 | Nik Stauskas | Sacramento Kings |
| 2014 | 1 | 21 | 21 | Mitch McGary | Oklahoma City Thunder |
| 2014 | 2 | 10 | 40 | Glenn Robinson III | Minnesota Timberwolves |
| 2016 | 1 | 20 | 20 | Caris LeVert | Indiana Pacers |

== See also ==
- 2013–14 Michigan Wolverines women's basketball team
