= 2014 Big Ten men's basketball tournament =

- Classification: Division I
- Season: 2013–14
- Teams: 12
- Site: Bankers Life Fieldhouse; Indianapolis, Indiana
- Champions: Michigan State (4th title)
- Winning coach: Tom Izzo (4th title)
- MVP: Branden Dawson (Michigan State)
- Attendance: 111,592
- Television: BTN, ESPN/2, CBS

2013–14 Big Ten Conference men's basketball standings
	Conf.				Overall
Team	W		L	PCT	W		L	PCT
No. 7 Michigan	15	–	3	.833	28	–	9	.757
No. 12 Wisconsin	12	–	6	.667	30	–	8	.789
No. 11 Michigan State†	12	–	6	.667	29	–	9	.763
Nebraska	11	–	7	.611	19	–	13	.594
No. 22 Ohio State	10	–	8	.556	25	–	10	.714
Iowa	9	–	9	.500	20	–	13	.606
Minnesota	8	–	10	.444	25	–	13	.658
Illinois	7	–	11	.389	20	–	15	.571
Indiana	7	–	11	.389	17	–	15	.531
Penn State	6	–	12	.333	16	–	18	.471
Northwestern	6	–	12	.333	14	–	19	.424
Purdue	5	–	13	.278	15	–	17	.469
† 2014 Big Ten tournament winner Rankings from AP poll

The 2014 Big Ten men's basketball tournament was the postseason men's basketball tournament for the Big Ten Conference held from March 13 through March 16, 2014 at Bankers Life Fieldhouse in Indianapolis, Indiana. The tournament was the seventeenth annual Big Ten men's basketball tournament and third and final year to feature 12 teams. The championship was won by Michigan State who defeated Michigan in the championship game. As a result, Michigan State received the conference's automatic bid to the NCAA tournament. The win marked Michigan State's fourth tournament championship (tying them with Ohio State for the most championships) and second championship in three years. Branden Dawson was named the Tournament's Most Outstanding Player.

== Seeds ==
All 12 Big Ten schools participated in the tournament. Teams were seeded by conference record, with a tiebreaker system used to seed teams with identical conference records. Seeding for the tournament was determined at the close of the regular conference season. The top four teams received a first-round bye. Tiebreaking procedures were unchanged from the 2013 tournament.

Seed	School	Conference	Tiebreaker 1	Tiebreaker 2
1	Michigan	15–3		
2	Wisconsin	12–6	1–0 vs MSU	
3	Michigan State	12–6	0–1 vs Wisc	
4	Nebraska	11–7		
5	Ohio State	10–8		
6	Iowa	9–9		
7	Minnesota	8–10		
8	Indiana	7–11	1–1 vs Ill	1–1 vs Mich
9	Illinois	7–11	1–1 vs Ind	0–1 vs Mich
10	Penn State	6–12	1–0 vs NW	
11	Northwestern	6–12	0–1 vs PSU	
12	Purdue	5–13		

== Game summaries ==
=== First round ===
BTN

Mar 13
12:00 pm

Recap

No. 9 Illinois 64, No. 8 Indiana 54
Scoring by half: 30–28, 34–26
Pts: Tracy Abrams 25; Rebs: Tracy Abrams 7 Asts: four tied with 2	Pts: Yogi Ferrell 14; Rebs: Jeremy Hollowell 6 Asts: Will Sheehey 5

Bankers Life Fieldhouse
Indianapolis, IN
Attendance: 18,596
Referees: Lamont Simpson; Larry Scirotto; Ray Perone

BTN

Mar 13
2:34 pm

Recap

No. 5 Ohio State 63, No. 12 Purdue 61
Scoring by half: 30–27, 33–34
Pts: LaQuinton Ross 19; Rebs: LaQuinton Ross 15; Asts: Aaron Craft 5	Pts: A. J. Hammons 15; Rebs: A. J. Hammons 9 Asts: Terone Johnson 4

Bankers Life Fieldhouse
Indianapolis, IN
Attendance: 18,596
Referees: Gene Steratore; Mike Sanzere; Buddy Mayborg

ESPN2

Mar 13
6:33 pm

Recap

No. 7 Minnesota 63, No. 10 Penn State 56
Scoring by half: 30–25, 33–31
Pts: Austin Hollins 18; Rebs: two tied with 6 Asts: DeAndre Mathieu 5	Pts: D. J. Newbill 16; Rebs: D. J. Newbill 7 Asts: Tim Frazier 5

Bankers Life Fieldhouse
Indianapolis, IN
Attendance: 16,028
Referees: Mike Kitts; Bo Boroski; Steve McJunkins

ESPN2

Mar 13
1:30 pm

Recap

No. 11 Northwestern 67, No. 6 Iowa 62
Scoring by half: 31–31, 36–31
Pts: Tre Demps 20; Rebs: two tied with 6 Asts: Drew Crawford 6	Pts: Roy Devyn Marble 25; Rebs: Jarrod Uthoff 9 Asts: Roy Devyn Marble 4

Bankers Life Fieldhouse
Indianapolis, IN
Attendance: 18,596
Referees: Terry Wymer; D.J. Carstensen; Bill Ek

=== Quarterfinals ===
ESPN

Mar 14
12:03 pm

Recap

No. 1 Michigan 64, No. 9 Illinois 63
Scoring by half: 38–33, 30–26
Pts: Nik Stauskas 19; Rebs: Jordan Morgan 4 Asts: Caris LeVert 13	Pts: Tracy Abrams; Rayvonte Rice 11; Rebs: Tracy Abrams 4 Asts: Tracy Abrams 5

Bankers Life Fieldhouse
Indianapolis, IN
Attendance: 18,596
Referees: Mike Kitts; Ray Perone; D.J. Carstensen

ESPN

Mar 14
2:27 pm

Recap

No. 5 Ohio State 71, No. 4 Nebraska 67
Scoring by half: 28–31, 43–36
Pts: LaQuinton Ross 26; Rebs: LaQuinton Ross 13; Asts: Aaron Craft 6	Pts: Terran Petteway 20; Rebs: David Rivers 9 Asts: Shavon Shields 4

Bankers Life Fieldhouse
Indianapolis, IN
Attendance: 18,596
Referees: Mike Sanzere; Jim Burr; Bill Ek

BTN

Mar 14
11:00 am

Recap

No. 2 Wisconsin 80, No. 7 Minnesota 67
Scoring by half: 34–22, 49–35
Pts: Ben Brust 29; Rebs: Frank Kaminsky 12; Asts: Traevon Jackson 4	Pts: DeAndre Mathieu 18; Rebs: two tied with 7 Asts: DeAndre Mathieu 5

Bankers Life Fieldhouse
Indianapolis, IN
Attendance: 18,596
Referees: Lamont Simpson; Chris Beaver; Lewis Garrison

BTN

Mar 14
9:00 pm

Recap

No. 3 Michigan State 64, No. 11 Northwestern 51
Scoring by half: 40–22, 27–29
Pts: Branden Dawson 16; Rebs: Branden Dawson 9 Asts: Denzel Valentine 4	Pts: Drew Crawford 21; Rebs: Tre Demps 7 Asts: Tre Demps 5

Bankers Life Fieldhouse
Indianapolis, IN
Attendance: 18,596
Referees: Bo Boroski; Gene Steratore; Larry Scirotto

=== Semifinals ===
CBS

Mar 15
1:43 pm

Recap

No. 1 Michigan 72, No. 5 Ohio State 69
Scoring by half: 42–40, 42–33
Pts: Nik Stauskas 18; Rebs: Caris LeVert 8 Asts: Derrick Walton Jr. 4	Pts: LaQuinton Ross 19; Rebs: Aaron Craft 7 Asts: two tied with 6

Bankers Life Fieldhouse
Indianapolis, IN
Attendance: 18,626
Referees: Lamont Simpson; Mike Kitts; Larry Scirotto

CBS

Mar 15
4:23 pm

Recap

No. 3 Michigan State 83, No. 2 Wisconsin 75
Scoring by half: 43–26, 40–49
Pts: Adreian Payne 18; Rebs: two tied with 7 Asts: Keith Appling 7	Pts: Frank Kaminsky 28; Rebs: Sam Dekker 7 Asts: Traevon Jackson 5

Bankers Life Fieldhouse
Indianapolis, IN
Attendance: 18,626
Referees: Terry Wymer; Gene Steratore; Bo Boroski

=== Championship ===
CBS

Mar 16
3:36 pm

Recap

No. 3 Michigan State 69, No. 1 Michigan 55
Scoring by half: 38–29, 31–26
Pts: Adreian Payne 18; Rebs: Adreian Payne 9 Asts: Travis Trice 4	Pts: Nik Stauskas 17; Rebs: Jordan Morgan 6 Asts: Caris LeVert 4

Bankers Life Fieldhouse
Indianapolis, IN
Attendance: 18,582
Referees: Mike Kitts; Terry Wymer; Gene Steratore

- Attendance for the six sessions was 111,592.

== Bracket ==
First round Thursday, March 13; ESPN2/BTN
8	Indiana	54
9	Illinois	64
5	#24 Ohio State	63
12	Purdue	61
7	Minnesota	63
10	Penn State	56
6	Iowa	62
11	Northwestern	67

Quarterfinals; Friday, March 14; ESPN/BTN
1	#8 Michigan	64
9	Illinois	63
4	Nebraska	67
5	#24 Ohio State	71
2	#12 Wisconsin	83
7	Minnesota	57
3	#22 Michigan State	67
11	Northwestern	51

Semifinals; Saturday, March 15; CBS
1	#8 Michigan	72
5	#24 Ohio State	69
2	#12 Wisconsin	75
3	#22 Michigan State	83

Championship; Sunday, March 16; CBS
1	#8 Michigan	55
3	#22 Michigan State	69

== All-Tournament Team ==
- Branden Dawson, Michigan State – Big Ten tournament Most Outstanding Player
- Gary Harris, Michigan State
- Adreian Payne, Michigan State
- Nik Stauskas, Michigan
- LaQuinton Ross, Ohio State

== See also ==
- 2014 Big Ten Conference women's basketball tournament
