= 2013–14 Big Ten Conference men's basketball season =

- League: NCAA Division I
- Sport: Basketball
- Teams: 12
- TV partner(s): Big Ten Network, ESPN, CBS

2013–14 NCAA Division I men's basketball season
- Regular season champions: Michigan
- Runners-up: Michigan State; Wisconsin
- Season MVP: Nik Stauskas, Michigan
- Top scorer: Terran Petteway, Nebraska

Tournament
- Venue: Bankers Life Fieldhouse, Indianapolis, Indiana
- Champions: Michigan State
- Runners-up: Michigan
- Finals MVP: Branden Dawson, Michigan State

Basketball seasons
- 2012–13 2014–15

2013–14 Big Ten Conference men's basketball standings
	Conf.				Overall
Team	W		L	PCT	W		L	PCT
No. 7 Michigan	15	–	3	.833	28	–	9	.757
No. 12 Wisconsin	12	–	6	.667	30	–	8	.789
No. 11 Michigan State†	12	–	6	.667	29	–	9	.763
Nebraska	11	–	7	.611	19	–	13	.594
No. 22 Ohio State	10	–	8	.556	25	–	10	.714
Iowa	9	–	9	.500	20	–	13	.606
Minnesota	8	–	10	.444	25	–	13	.658
Illinois	7	–	11	.389	20	–	15	.571
Indiana	7	–	11	.389	17	–	15	.531
Penn State	6	–	12	.333	16	–	18	.471
Northwestern	6	–	12	.333	14	–	19	.424
Purdue	5	–	13	.278	15	–	17	.469
† 2014 Big Ten tournament winner Rankings from AP poll

The 2013–14 Big Ten men's basketball season began with practices in October 2013, followed by the start of the 2013–14 NCAA Division I men's basketball season in November. Michigan won the regular season title, but lost to Michigan State in the championship game of the 2014 Big Ten Conference men's basketball tournament.

Following the season 9 teams participated in post season tournaments. Six teams were invited to participate in the 2014 NCAA Men's Division I Basketball Tournament; two teams were selected for the 2014 National Invitation Tournament and one team competed in the 2014 College Basketball Invitational. The conference posted a 17–7 record in postseason tournaments. Wisconsin reached the final four of the NCAA Tournament and Minnesota won the NIT Tournament.

Nik Stauskas was the Big Ten Conference Men's Basketball Player of the Year and a 2014 Consensus All-American. Big Ten Defensive Player of the Year Aaron Craft was named the NABC Defensive Player of the Year and Men's Basketball Academic All-American of the Year.

The conference had 7 selections in the 2014 NBA draft, including 5 in the first round: Nik Stauskas (8th), Noah Vonleh (9th), Adreian Payne (15th), Gary Harris (19th), Mitch McGary (21st), Glenn Robinson III (40th), and Roy Devyn Marble (56th).

== Preseason ==
=== Preseason watchlists ===
Below is a table of notable preseason watch lists. The Senior CLASS award is only for seniors and the Cousy Award is only for point guards.

	Wooden	Naismith	Senior CLASS	Robertson	Cousy
Noah Vonleh IND	✓	✓			
Yogi Ferrell IND		✓			✓
Mitch McGary MICH	✓	✓		✓	
Glenn Robinson III MICH	✓	✓			
Keith Appling MSU	✓				✓
Gary Harris MSU	✓	✓		✓	
Adreian Payne MSU	✓	✓		✓	
Andre Hollins MINN	✓				
Aaron Craft OSU	✓	✓	✓	✓	✓
LaQuinton Ross OSU	✓	✓			
Tim Frazier PSU			✓		✓
Sam Dekker WIS	✓	✓			

=== Preseason honors ===
The following players were selected to the CBS Sports, Associated Press, Sporting News, USA Today, USA Today Sports 2013–14 College Basketball Preview Magazine, Blue Ribbon College Basketball Yearbook, Athlon Sports and ESPN preseason All-American teams and the preseason media All-Big Ten team. Preseason All-Big Ten Conference selections are also shown below.

	CBS	AP	TSN	USA Today	USA Today (mag)	Blue Ribbon	Athlon Sports	ESPN	NBC	BigTen.org	BTN
Mitch McGary	2nd	1st	1st	2nd	1st	2nd	2nd		2nd	✓	✓
Adreian Payne	3rd					1st			3rd	✓	✓
Aaron Craft	2nd			2nd		3rd			3rd	✓	✓
Gary Harris	2nd			2nd		4th	3rd		2nd	POY	POY
Glenn Robinson III										✓	✓
Tim Frazier										✓	

=== Preseason polls ===
The official preseason media poll announced by the Big Ten Conference at its October 31 media day conference predicted the order of finish at the top of the conference standings would be Michigan State followed by Michigan and Ohio State.

Several Preseason polls included Big Ten Teams. Sports Illustrated both posted a preseason power ranking and a college basketball preview edition. One of the four regional cover versions featured Harris and Robinson.

	AP	Coaches	CBS	SI PR	SI CBP	Sporting News	Blue Ribbon
Illinois							
Indiana		24				25	
Iowa					17	23	24
Michigan	7	9	12	6	7	7	9
Michigan State	2	2	3	3	3	2	1
Minnesota							
Nebraska							
Northwestern							
Ohio State	11	10	8	8	11	11	11
Penn State							
Purdue							
Wisconsin	20	21	19	16		14	

=== Exhibitions ===
The first conference exhibition game occurred on October 24, when Illinois hosted McKendree University. In Michigan's second exhibition game on November 4 against Wayne State at Crisler Center, the Big Ten Network scheduled it first-ever live Student U telecast on the linear TV network.

== Conference schedules ==
Before the season, it was announced that for the seventh consecutive season, all regular season conference games and conference tournament games would be broadcast nationally by CBS Sports, ESPN Inc. family of networks including ESPN, ESPN2 and ESPNU, and the Big Ten Network. The Big Ten led the nation in attendance for the 38th consecutive season with an average attendance of 13,534, including regular season home games and all six sessions of the Big Ten Men’s Basketball Tournament or 13,389 including only regular season and postseason home games. Nine schools ranked among the nations top 25: Indiana (6th, 17,359), Wisconsin (7th, 17,104), Ohio State (8th, 16,474), Nebraska (13th, 15,419), Illinois (15th, 15,246), Iowa (17th, 14,976), Michigan State (18th, 14,797), Purdue (23rd, 12,738) and Michigan (24th, 12,698). The Big Ten established an NCAA record with its 13,534 average attendance and distanced itself from other leading conferences: ACC (10,661), Big 12 (10,489), SEC (10,353) and Big East (9,711).

=== 2013 ACC–Big Ten Challenge (Tied 6–6) ===
ACC–Big Ten Challenge results:

Date	Time	ACC team	B1G team	Score	Location	Television	Attendance	Challenge leader
Dec 3	7:15 pm	No. 4 **Syracuse**	Indiana	69–52	Carrier Dome • Syracuse, New York	ESPN	26,414	ACC (1–0)
Dec 3	7:15 pm	**Georgia Tech**	Illinois	67–64	Hank McCamish Pavilion • Atlanta, Georgia	ESPN2	6,516	ACC (2–0)
Dec 3	7:30 pm	**Pittsburgh**	Penn State	78–69	Petersen Events Center • Pittsburgh	ESPNU	12,510	ACC (3–0)
Dec 3	9:15 pm	No. 10 **Duke**	No. 22 Michigan	79–69	Cameron Indoor Stadium • Durham, North Carolina	ESPN	9,314	ACC (4–0)
Dec 3	9:15 pm	Notre Dame	No. 23 **Iowa**	98–93	Carver–Hawkeye Arena • Iowa City, Iowa	ESPN2	15,400	ACC (4–1)
Dec 3	9:30 pm	Florida State	**Minnesota**	71–61	Williams Arena • Minneapolis, Minnesota	ESPNU	11,386	ACC (4–2)
Dec 4	7:00 pm	Maryland	No. 5 **Ohio State**	76–60	Value City Arena • Columbus, Ohio	ESPN	16,206	ACC (4–3)
Dec 4	7:00 pm	Virginia	No. 8 **Wisconsin**	48–38	John Paul Jones Arena • Charlottesville, Virginia	ESPN2	11,142	Tied (4–4)
Dec 4	7:30 pm	**NC State**	Northwestern	69–48	PNC Arena • Raleigh, North Carolina	ESPNU	11,459	ACC (5–4)
Dec 4	9:00 pm	**North Carolina**	No. 1 Michigan State	79–65	Breslin Student Events Center • East Lansing, Michigan	ESPN	14,797	ACC (6–4)
Dec 4	9:30 pm	Boston College	**Purdue**	88–67	Mackey Arena • West Lafayette, Indiana	ESPN2	12,926	ACC (6–5)
Dec 4	9:30 pm	Miami	**Nebraska**	60–49	Pinnacle Bank Arena • Lincoln, Nebraska	ESPNU	15,088	Tied (6–6)
**Winners are in bold** Game times in EST. Rankings from AP Poll (Dec 2). Notre Dame, Pittsburgh, and Syracuse made their inaugural appearances in the event. Clemson, Virginia Tech, and Wake Forest did not play due to the ACC having three more teams than the B1G. Last Challenge in which Maryland represented the ACC, as they joined the B1G following the season.

== Rankings ==
The Big Ten began the season with five teams ranked and two others receiving votes in the Coaches' Poll. It began the season with 4 teams ranked and two receiving votes in the AP Poll. In the third poll of the season, Michigan State achieved its first number one ranking since the 2000–01 Spartans reached were number 1 on January 2, 2001.

Legend
	Improvement in ranking
	Drop in ranking
	Not ranked previous week
RV	Received votes but were not ranked in Top 25 of poll

		Pre/ Wk 1	Wk 2	Wk 3	Wk 4	Wk 5	Wk 6	Wk 7	Wk 8	Wk 9	Wk 10	Wk 11	Wk 12	Wk 13	Wk 14	Wk 15	Wk 16	Wk 17	Wk 18	Wk 19	Wk 20	Final
Illinois	AP				RV	RV			RV	RV	23	RV										
Illinois	C	RV	RV						RV	RV	RV											
Indiana	AP	RV	RV	RV	RV	RV	RV															
Indiana	C	24	23	22	25	23	RV															
Iowa	AP	RV	RV	RV	23	23	23	25	22	22	20	14	10	15	17	16	15	20	24	RV		
Iowa	C	RV	RV	25	23	24	22	RV	23	23	T23	16	10	12	13	15	15	19	25	RV	RV	
Michigan	AP	7	7	14	22	22	RV	RV	RV	RV	RV	RV	21	10	10	15	20	16	12	8T	7	
Michigan	C	9	8	13	20	21	25	RV	RV	RV	RV	RV	25T	14	16	18	20	16	12	9	8	6
Michigan State	AP	2 (22)	2 (22)	1 (51)	1 (56)	1 (63)	5	5	5	5	5	4	3	7	9	9	13	18	22	22	11	
Michigan State	C	2 (3)	2 (2)	1 (22)	1 (30)	1 (31)	5	5	5	4	T4	4 (1)	3	6	8	10	14	18	22	22	13	8
Minnesota	AP			RV	RV																	
Minnesota	C																					RV
Nebraska	AP																			RV		
Nebraska	C																RV	RV		RV	RV	
Northwestern	AP																					
Northwestern	C																					
Ohio State	AP	11	10	8	7	5	3	3	3	3	3	11	17	24	RV	22	24	22	RV	24	22	
Ohio State	C	10	9	8	6	3	2 (1)	2 (1)	3 (1)	3 (1)	3 (1)	9	15	23	25	20	23	20	RV	24	24	RV
Penn State	AP																					
Penn State	C																					
Purdue	AP																					
Purdue	C																					
Wisconsin	AP	20	20	12	10	8	4	4	4	4	4	3	9	14	RV	21	16	14	9	12	12	
Wisconsin	C	21	19	15	11	9	6	6	6	5	T4	3	8	13	24	21	18	14	11	13	15	4

== Player of the week ==
Players of the week

Throughout the conference regular season, the Big Ten offices named one or two players of the week and one or two freshmen of the week each Monday.

Week	Player of the week	Freshman of the week
November 11, 2013	Shavon Shields, NEB	Noah Vonleh, IND
November 18, 2013	Adreian Payne, MSU	Noah Vonleh (2), IND
November 25, 2013	Frank Kaminsky, WIS	Bryson Scott, PUR
December 2, 2013	Rayvonte Rice, ILL	Zak Irvin, MICH
December 9, 2013	LaQuinton Ross, OSU	Noah Vonleh (3), IND
December 16, 2013	Austin Hollins, MINN	Bryson Scott (2), PUR
December 23, 2013	Adreian Payne (2), MSU	Noah Vonleh (4), IND
December 23, 2013	Adreian Payne (2), MSU	Zak Irvin (2), MICH
December 30, 2013	Rayvonte Rice (2), ILL	Nigel Hayes, WIS
December 30, 2013	Keith Appling, MSU	Nigel Hayes, WIS
January 6, 2014	Aaron Craft, OSU	Nigel Hayes (2), WIS
January 13, 2014	Roy Devyn Marble, IOWA	Noah Vonleh (5), IND
January 21, 2014	Nik Stauskas, MICH	Noah Vonleh (6), IND
January 27, 2014	Nik Stauskas (2), MICH	Derrick Walton, MICH
February 4, 2014	Drew Crawford, NU	Noah Vonleh (7), IND
February 4, 2014	D. J. Newbill, PSU	Noah Vonleh (7), IND
February 10, 2014	Aaron Craft (2), OSU	Nigel Hayes (3), WIS
February 17, 2014	Frank Kaminsky (2), WIS	Nigel Hayes (4), WIS
February 17, 2014	Terran Petteway, NEB	Nigel Hayes (4), WIS
February 24, 2014	Nik Stauskas (3), MICH	Kendrick Nunn, ILL
March 3, 2014	Will Sheehey, IND	Kendrick Nunn (2), ILL
March 10, 2014	Nik Stauskas (4), MICH	Troy Williams, IND
March 10, 2014	Shavon Shields (2), NEB	Troy Williams, IND

- Nik Stauskas also earned national player of the week recognition from CBS Sports on January 27.
- Stauskas also earned Oscar Robertson National Player of the Week recognition from United States Basketball Writers Association (USBWA) on January 28.
- Drew Crawford earned Oscar Robertson National Player of the Week on February 4.

== Honors and awards ==
Aaron Craft and Jordan Morgan were named to the 5-man NCAA Division I Allstate Good Works Team for their commitment to improving their communities and the lives of others. Craft and Drew Crawford were first team Academic All-America selections. Craft was named the Men's Basketball Academic All-America Team Member of the Year. Craft also earned the NABC Defensive Player of the Year award.

Stauskas was a 2014 NCAA Men's Basketball All-American second-team selection by the Sporting News. Stauskas earned third team All-American recognition from USA Today, while Gary Harris and Sam Dekker were honorable mention honorees. Stauskas was a first team All-American selection by the National Association of Basketball Coaches (NABC). He was also a second team selection by Sports Illustrated and Bleacher Report, as well as a third team selection by NBC Sports. When Stauskas was named second team All-American by the Associated Press, he became a consensus All-American. Harris and Payne where honorable mention AP selections. Stauskas also earned John R. Wooden Award All-American Team recognition.

=== Watchlists ===
Keith Appling, Adreian Payne, Aaron Craft, and Sam Dekker were included in the Wooden Award midseason Top 25 watchlist. Appling and Gary Harris were selected to the 23-man Oscar Robertson Award midseason watchlist by the United States Basketball Writers Association (USBWA). Appling, Harris, Nik Stauskas and Roy Devyn Marble were named to the 30-man Naismith College Player of the Year midseason watchlist. Noah Vonleh was selected for the 9-player Integris Wayman Tisdale Award Midseason Watch List by the USBWA. On January 31, Aaron Craft, Drew Crawford, Shavon Shields and Dave Sobolewski were named an Academic All-District by CoSIDA, placing them among the 40 finalists for fifteen 2013–14 Academic All-American basketball selections. On February 12, Craft and Tim Frazier were named two of ten finalists for the Men's basketball Senior CLASS Award. On February 17, Yogi Ferrell, Appling and Craft were among the 23 finalists for the Bob Cousy Award. Although the Big Ten had no finalists for the USBWA's Robertson or Tisdale Awards, John Beilein was one of ten finalists for the USBWA's Henry Iba National Coach of the Year Award. He was also a finalist for the Naismith College Coach of the Year, and Jim Phelan Awards. Tim Miles was also a finalist for the Phelan award. On March 8, Stauskas and Harris were listed among the 15 finalists for the John R. Wooden Award. Craft was one of six Cousy Award finalist.

=== All-Big Ten Awards and Teams ===
On March 10, The Big Ten announced most of its conference awards.

Honor	Coaches	Media
Player of the Year	Nik Stauskas, Michigan	Nik Stauskas, Michigan
Coach of the Year	Tim Miles, Nebraska	John Beilein, Michigan
Freshman of the Year	Noah Vonleh, Indiana	Noah Vonleh, Indiana
Defensive Player of the Year	Aaron Craft, Ohio State	Not Selected
Sixth Man of the Year	Nigel Hayes, Wisconsin	Not Selected
All-Big Ten First Team	Nik Stauskas, Michigan	Nik Stauskas, Michigan
All-Big Ten First Team	Gary Harris, Michigan State	Gary Harris, Michigan State
All-Big Ten First Team	Roy Devyn Marble, Iowa	Roy Devyn Marble, Iowa
All-Big Ten First Team	Terran Petteway, Nebraska	Terran Petteway, Nebraska
All-Big Ten First Team	Frank Kaminsky, Wisconsin	Frank Kaminsky, Wisconsin
All-Big Ten Second Team	Yogi Ferrell, Indiana	Yogi Ferrell, Indiana
All-Big Ten Second Team	Adreian Payne, Michigan State	Adreian Payne, Michigan State
All-Big Ten Second Team	Caris LeVert, Michigan	Caris LeVert, Michigan
All-Big Ten Second Team	D. J. Newbill, Penn State	D. J. Newbill, Penn State
All-Big Ten Second Team	Sam Dekker, Wisconsin	Aaron Craft, Ohio State
All-Big Ten Third Team	Aaron Craft, Ohio State	Sam Dekker, Wisconsin
All-Big Ten Third Team	Tim Frazier, Penn State	Tim Frazier, Penn State
All-Big Ten Third Team	Aaron White, Iowa	Aaron White, Iowa
All-Big Ten Third Team	Noah Vonleh, Indiana	Noah Vonleh, Indiana
All-Big Ten Third Team	LaQuinton Ross, Ohio State	Drew Crawford, Northwestern
All-Big Ten Honorable Mention	Drew Crawford, Northwestern	LaQuinton Ross, Ohio State
All-Big Ten Honorable Mention	Keith Appling, Michigan State	Keith Appling, Michigan State
All-Big Ten Honorable Mention	Glenn Robinson III, Michigan	Glenn Robinson III, Michigan
All-Big Ten Honorable Mention	Andre Hollins, Minnesota	Andre Hollins, Minnesota
All-Big Ten Honorable Mention	A. J. Hammons, Purdue	A. J. Hammons, Purdue
All-Big Ten Honorable Mention	Ben Brust, Wisconsin	Ben Brust, Wisconsin
All-Big Ten Honorable Mention	Shavon Shields, Nebraska	Shavon Shields, Nebraska
All-Big Ten Honorable Mention	Rayvonte Rice, Illinois	Rayvonte Rice, Illinois
All-Big Ten Honorable Mention	Denzel Valentine, Michigan State	Denzel Valentine, Michigan State
All-Big Ten Honorable Mention	Not Selected	Will Sheehey, Indiana
All-Big Ten Honorable Mention	Not Selected	DeAndre Mathieu, Minnesota
All-Big Ten Honorable Mention	Not Selected	Josh Gasser, Wisconsin
All-Big Ten Honorable Mention	Not Selected	Traevon Jackson, Wisconsin
All-Freshman Team	Kendrick Nunn, Illinois	Not Selected
All-Freshman Team	Derrick Walton Jr., Michigan	Not Selected
All-Freshman Team	Nigel Hayes, Wisconsin	Not Selected
All-Freshman Team	Noah Vonleh, Indiana	Not Selected
All-Freshman Team	Kendall Stephens, Purdue	Not Selected
All-Defensive Team	Gary Harris, Michigan State	Not Selected
All-Defensive Team	A. J. Hammons, Purdue	Not Selected
All-Defensive Team	Aaron Craft, Ohio State	Not Selected
All-Defensive Team	Shannon Scott, Ohio State	Not Selected
All-Defensive Team	Josh Gasser, Wisconsin	Not Selected

34 athletes earned Academic All-Big Ten recognition. Drew Crawford and Tim Frazier earned their fourth Academic All-B1G recognitions, while Aaron Craft earned his third.

=== NABC ===
The National Association of Basketball Coaches announced their Division I All-District teams on March 12, recognizing the nation's best men's collegiate basketball student-athletes. Selected and voted on by member coaches of the NABC, 252 student-athletes, from 25 districts were chosen. The selections on this list were then eligible for NABC Coaches' All-America Honors. The following list represented the District 7 players chosen to the list.

First Team

- Nik Stauskas, Michigan
- Terran Petteway, Nebraska
- Gary Harris, Michigan State
- Roy Devyn Marble, Iowa
- Yogi Ferrell, Indiana

Second Team

- Adreian Payne, Michigan State
- Drew Crawford, Northwestern
- D. J. Newbill, Penn State
- Aaron Craft, Ohio State
- Keith Appling, Michigan State

=== USBWA ===
On March 11, the U.S. Basketball Writers Association released its 2013–14 Men's All-District Teams, based upon voting from its national membership. There were nine regions from coast to coast, and a player and coach of the year were selected in each. The following lists all the Big Ten representatives selected within their respective regions.

District II (NY, NJ, DE, DC, PA, WV)

None Selected

District V (OH, IN, IL, MI, MN, WI)

Player of the Year

- Nik Stauskas, Michigan

Coach of the Year

- John Beilein, Michigan

All-District Team

- Aaron Craft, Ohio State
- Sam Dekker, Wisconsin
- Yogi Ferrell, Indiana
- Gary Harris, Michigan State
- Frank Kaminsky, Wisconsin
- Caris LeVert, Michigan
- Adreian Payne, Michigan State
- Nik Stauskas, Michigan
District VI (IA, MO, KS, OK, NE, ND, SD)
- Roy Devyn Marble, Iowa
- Terran Petteway, Nebraska

== Postseason ==
=== Big Ten tournament ===
- March 13–16, 2014 Big Ten Conference men's basketball tournament, Bankers Life Fieldhouse, Indianapolis.

2014 Big Ten Conference men's basketball tournament seeds and results
Seed	School	Conf.	Over.	Tiebreaker	First round March 13	Quarterfinals March 14	Semifinals March 15	Championship March 16
1	Michigan ‡ #	15–3	24–7		Bye	Defeated Illinois 64–63	Defeated Ohio State 72–69	Eliminated by Michigan State 55–69
2	Wisconsin #	12–6	26–6	1–0 vs Michigan St.	Bye	Defeated Minnesota 83–57	Eliminated by Michigan State 75–83	
3	Michigan State #	12–6	24–8	0–1 vs Wisconsin	Bye	Defeated Northwestern 67–51	Defeated Wisconsin 83–75	Defeated Michigan 69–55
4	Nebraska #	11–7	19–12		Bye	Eliminated by Ohio State 67–71		
5	Ohio State	10–8	25–8		Defeated Purdue 63–61	Defeated Nebraska 71–67	Eliminated by Michigan 69–72	
6	Iowa	9–9	20–12		Eliminated by Northwestern 62–67			
7	Minnesota	8–10	20–13		Defeated Penn State 63–56	Eliminated by Wisconsin 67–83		
8	Indiana	7–11	17–15	1–1 vs Illinois	Eliminated by Illinois 54–64			
9	Illinois	7–11	19–14	1–1 vs Indiana	Defeated Indiana 64–54	Eliminated by Michigan 63–64		
10	Penn State	6–12	15–17	1–0 vs. Northwestern	Eliminated by Minnesota 56–63			
11	Northwestern	6–12	14–19	0–1 vs. Penn State	Defeated Iowa 67–62	Eliminated by Michigan State 51–67		
12	Purdue	5–13	15–17		Eliminated by Ohio State 61–63			
‡ – Big Ten regular season champions, and tournament No. 1 seed. # – Received a bye in the conference tournament. Overall records include all games played in the Big Ten tournament.

=== NCAA tournament ===
The Big Ten Conference had six bids to the 2014 NCAA Men's Division I Basketball Tournament. However, the conference endured its 14th consecutive season without winning the tournament.

Seed	Region	School	First Four	Round of 64	Round of 32	Sweet 16	Elite Eight	Final Four	Championship
2	Midwest	Michigan	n/a	Defeated Wofford 57–40	Defeated Texas 79–65	Defeated Tennessee 73–71	Eliminated by Kentucky 72–75		
2	West	Wisconsin	n/a	Defeated American 75–35	Defeated Oregon 85–77	Defeated Baylor 69–52	Defeated Arizona 64–63 (OT)	Eliminated by Kentucky 74-73	
4	East	Michigan State	n/a	Defeated Delaware 93–78	Defeated Harvard 80–73	Defeated Virginia 61–59	Eliminated by Connecticut 54–60		
6	South	Ohio State	n/a	Eliminated by Dayton 60–59					
11	West	Nebraska	n/a	Eliminated by Baylor 74–60					
11	Midwest	Iowa	Eliminated by Tennessee 78–65						
		W–L (%):	0–1 (.000)	3–2 (.600)	3–0 (1.000)	3–0 (1.000)	1–2 (.333)	0–1 (.000)	0–0 (–) Total: 10–6 (.625)

=== National Invitation tournament ===
Minnesota won the National Invitation Tournament for the third time in school history.

Seed	Bracket	School	First round	Second round	Quarterfinals	Semifinals	Finals
1	Minnesota	Minnesota	Defeated High Point 88–81	Defeated Saint Mary's 63–55	Defeated Southern Miss 81–73	Defeated Florida State 67–64^{OT}	Defeated SMU 65–63
2	St. John's	Illinois	Defeated Boston University 66–62	Eliminated by Clemson 50–49			
		W–L (%):	2–0 (1.000)	1–1 (.500)	1–0 (1.000)	1–0 (1.000)	1–0 (1.000) Total: 6–1 (.857)

=== College Basketball Invitational ===
School	First round	Quarterfinals	Semifinals	Finals
Penn State	Defeated Hampton 69–65	Eliminated by Siena 52–54		
W–L (%):	1–0 (1.000)	0–1 (.000)	0–0 (–)	0–0 (–) Total: 1–1 (.500)

=== 2014 NBA draft ===
The following all-conference selections were listed as seniors: Roy Devyn Marble, Adreian Payne, Aaron Craft, Tim Frazier, and Drew Crawford.

Players who have declared for the 2014 draft lose their NCAA eligibility on April 15, 2014, although players with eligibility remain eligible to declare for the draft until April 27. At the close of business on April 15, the Big Ten Network sent a tweet of tweets that listed the following individuals as having declared for the draft: Noah Vonleh, LaQuinton Ross, Gary Harris, Nik Stauskas and Glenn Robinson III. Mitch McGary eventually joined the list of early entrants.

Marble, Payne, Craft and all six early entrants were selected to receive invitations to the NBA Draft Combine. Seven Big Ten athletes were selected and five were selected in the first round. That was the most first rounders since the 1990 NBA draft and the most overall since the 2000 NBA draft when 8 players were drafted.

PG	Point guard	SG	Shooting guard	SF	Small forward	PF	Power forward	C	Center

Rnd.	Pick	Player	Pos.	Nationality	Team	School / club team
1	8	Nik Stauskas	SG	Canada	Sacramento Kings	Michigan (So.)
1	9	Noah Vonleh	PF	United States	Charlotte Hornets(from Detroit) (Note: June 26, 2012: Detroit Pistons to Charlotte Bobcats (now Charlotte Hornets): Charlotte acquired Ben Gordon and a conditional 2013 first-round pick (protected top 14 in 2013, top 8 in 2014); Detroit acquired Corey Maggette)	Indiana (Fr.)
1	15	Adreian Payne	PF	United States	Atlanta Hawks	Michigan State (Sr.)
1	19	Gary Harris	SG	United States	Chicago Bulls	Michigan State (So.)
1	21	Mitch McGary	C	United States	Oklahoma City Thunder (from Dallas via L.A. Lakers and Houston) (Note: December 11, 2011: Dallas Mavericks to Los Angeles Lakers: L.A. Lakers acquired a conditional 2012 first-round pick (protected top 20 in 2012–14); Dallas acquired Lamar Odom and a 2012 second-round pick; March 15, 2012: Los Angeles Lakers to Houston Rockets: Houston acquired Derek Fisher and Dallas' conditional 2012 first-round pick (protected top 20 in 2012–14); L.A. Lakers acquired Jordan Hill; October 27, 2012: Houston Rockets to Oklahoma City Thunder: Oklahoma City acquired Kevin Martin, Jeremy Lamb, a 2013 first-round pick, Dallas' conditional 2013 first-round pick (protected top 20 in 2013–14) and a 2013 second-round pick; Houston acquired James Harden, Cole Aldrich, Daequan Cook and Lazar Hayward)	Michigan (So.)
2	40	Glenn Robinson III	SF	United States	Minnesota Timberwolves (from New Orleans) (Note: September 9, 2009: New Orleans Hornets (now New Orleans Pelicans) to Minnesota Timberwolves: Minnesota acquired Antonio Daniels and a 2014 second-round pick; New Orleans acquired Bobby Brown and Darius Songaila)	Michigan (So.)
2	56	Roy Devyn Marble	SG	United States	Orlando Magic (from Portland, (Note: June 23, 2011: Portland Trail Blazers to Denver Nuggets (three-team trade): Denver acquired Andre Miller and a 2014 second-round pick from Portland; Denver acquired draft rights to Jordan Hamilton from Dallas; Portland acquired Raymond Felton from Denver; Portland acquired draft rights to Tanguy Ngombo from Dallas; Dallas acquired Rudy Fernández and draft rights to Petteri Koponen from Portland) traded to Orlando) (Note: Orlando Magic and Denver Nuggets trade: Orlando acquired Evan Fournier and draft rights to 56th pick Roy Devyn Marble; Denver acquired Arron Afflalo)	Iowa (Sr.)

==== Pre-draft trades ====
Prior to the day of the draft, the following trades were made and resulted in exchanges of draft picks between the teams.

==== Draft-day trades ====
The following trades involving drafted players were made on the day of the draft.
