= 2013–14 Ohio State Buckeyes men's basketball team =

American college basketball season

2013–14 Ohio State Buckeyes men's basketball

NCAA tournament, round of 32
- Conference: Big Ten Conference

Ranking
- AP: No. 22
- Record: 25–10 (10–8 Big Ten)
- Head coach: Thad Matta
- Assistant coaches: Dave Dickerson; Jeff Boals; Greg Paulus
- Home arena: Value City Arena

2013–14 Big Ten Conference men's basketball standings
	Conf.				Overall
Team	W		L	PCT	W		L	PCT
No. 7 Michigan	15	–	3	.833	28	–	9	.757
No. 12 Wisconsin	12	–	6	.667	30	–	8	.789
No. 11 Michigan State†	12	–	6	.667	29	–	9	.763
Nebraska	11	–	7	.611	19	–	13	.594
No. 22 Ohio State	10	–	8	.556	25	–	10	.714
Iowa	9	–	9	.500	20	–	13	.606
Minnesota	8	–	10	.444	25	–	13	.658
Illinois	7	–	11	.389	20	–	15	.571
Indiana	7	–	11	.389	17	–	15	.531
Penn State	6	–	12	.333	16	–	18	.471
Northwestern	6	–	12	.333	14	–	19	.424
Purdue	5	–	13	.278	15	–	17	.469
† 2014 Big Ten tournament winner Rankings from AP poll

The 2013–14 Ohio State Buckeyes men's basketball team represented Ohio State University in the 2013–14 NCAA Division I men's basketball season. Their head coach was Thad Matta, in his tenth season with the Buckeyes. The team played its home games at Value City Arena in Columbus, Ohio and was a member of the Big Ten Conference. They finished the season 25–10, 10–8 in Big Ten play to finish in fifth place. They advanced to the semifinals of the Big Ten tournament where they lost to rival Michigan. They received an at-large bid to the NCAA tournament where they lost in the second round to Dayton.

== Before the season ==
=== Previous season ===
The Buckeye finished the season with 29–8 overall, 13–5 in Big Ten play and won the Big Ten tournament to earn a trip to the 2013 NCAA Division I men's basketball tournament. They were in the 2nd seed in the west and defeated Iona in the second round, Iowa State in the third round, and Arizona in the sweet sixteen before falling in the elite eight against Wichita State.

=== Departures ===
Name	Number	Pos.	Height	Weight	Year	Hometown	Notes
Deshaun Thomas	1	F	6'7"	215	Junior	Fort Wayne, IN	NBA draft
Alex Rogers	14	G	6'2"	200	Senior	Cincinnati, OH	Graduated
Evan Ravenel	30	F	6'8"	250	Senior	Tampa, FL	Graduated

=== Recruiting ===
College recruiting information
Name	Hometown	School	Height	Weight	Commit date
Kameron Williams; SG	Baltimore, Maryland	Mount St. Joseph	6 ft 3 in (1.91 m)	170 lb (77 kg)	Sep 18, 2012
Kameron Williams; SG	Recruit ratings: Scout: Rivals: (87)				
Marc Loving; SF	Toledo, Ohio	Saint John's	6 ft 8 in (2.03 m)	200 lb (91 kg)	Aug 5, 2010
Marc Loving; SF	Recruit ratings: Scout: Rivals: (86)				
Overall recruit ranking: Scout: NR Rivals: NR ESPN: NR
Note: In many cases, Scout, Rivals, 247Sports, On3, and ESPN may conflict in their listings of height and weight.; In these cases, the average was taken. ESPN grades are on a 100-point scale.; Sources: "2013 Team Ranking". Rivals.

== Roster ==
2013–14 Ohio State Buckeyes men's basketball team
Players
Coaches

Pos.	#	Name	Height	Weight	Year	Hometown
G	0	Oleh Onopriienko	6 ft 1 in (1.85 m)	206 lb (93 kg)	So	Dniepropetrvosk, Ukraine
G	3	Shannon Scott	6 ft 1 in (1.85 m)	185 lb (84 kg)	Jr	Alpharetta, Georgia
G	4	Aaron Craft	6 ft 2 in (1.88 m)	195 lb (88 kg)	Sr	Findlay, Ohio
F	10	LaQuinton Ross	6 ft 8 in (2.03 m)	220 lb (100 kg)	Jr	Jackson, Mississippi
F	12	Sam Thompson	6 ft 7 in (2.01 m)	200 lb (91 kg)	Jr	Chicago, Illinois
G	15	Kam Williams	6 ft 2 in (1.88 m)	175 lb (79 kg)	Fr	Baltimore, Maryland
C	23	Amir Williams	6 ft 11 in (2.11 m)	250 lb (113 kg)	Jr	Birmingham, Michigan
G	24	Andrew Goldstein	6 ft 3 in (1.91 m)	200 lb (91 kg)	Jr	Marlboro, New Jersey
G	32	Lenzelle Smith Jr.	6 ft 4 in (1.93 m)	210 lb (95 kg)	Sr	Zion, Illinois
G	33	Amedeo Della Valle	6 ft 5 in (1.96 m)	190 lb (86 kg)	So	Alba, Italy
F	34	Jake Lorbach	6 ft 7 in (2.01 m)	210 lb (95 kg)	So	Elyria, Ohio
C	55	Trey McDonald	6 ft 8 in (2.03 m)	240 lb (109 kg)	Jr	Battle Creek, Michigan

Head coach

- Thad Matta (Butler)

Assistant coach(es)

- Dave Dickerson (Maryland)
- Jeff Boals (Ohio)
- Greg Paulus (Duke)

Legend

- (C) Team captain
- (S) Suspended
- (I) Ineligible
- (W) Walk-on
- Injured
- Current redshirt

Roster
Last update: 2012-09-05

== Schedule ==
Date time, TV	Rank^{#}	Opponent^{#}	Result	Record	Site (attendance) city, state
Exhibition
Nov 3*; 4:00 pm	No. 11	Walsh	W 93–63	–	Value City Arena (14,092); Columbus, OH
Regular season
Nov 9*; 12:00 pm	No. 11	Morgan State	W 89–50	1–0	Value City Arena (16,777); Columbus, OH
Nov 12*; 8:00 pm, BTN	No. 10	Ohio	W 79–69	2–0	Value City Arena (17,388); Columbus, OH
Nov 16*; 1:00 pm, FOX	No. 10	at No. 17 Marquette	W 52–35	3–0	BMO Harris Bradley Center (18,756); Milwaukee, WI
Nov 20*; 7:30 pm, BTN	No. 8	American	W 63–52	4–0	Value City Arena (14,639); Columbus, OH
Nov 25*; 7:00 pm, BTN	No. 7	Wyoming	W 65–50	5–0	Value City Arena (15,438); Columbus, OH
Nov 29*; 5:00 pm, BTN	No. 7	North Florida	W 99–64	6–0	Value City Arena (14,758); Columbus, OH
Dec 4*; 7:00 pm, ESPN	No. 5	Maryland; ACC–Big Ten Challenge	W 76–60	7–0	Value City Arena (16,206); Columbus, OH
Dec 7*; 4:30 pm, BTN	No. 5	Central Connecticut	W 74–56	8–0	Value City Arena (13,640); Columbus, OH
Dec 11*; 7:30 pm, BTN	No. 3	Bryant; Gotham Classic	W 86–48	9–0	Value City Arena (12,723); Columbus, OH
Dec 14*; 8:15 pm, BTN	No. 3	North Dakota State; Gotham Classic	W 79–62	10–0	Value City Arena (15,272); Columbus, OH
Dec 18*; 7:00 pm, BTN	No. 3	Delaware; Gotham Classic	W 76–64	11–0	Value City Arena (14,420); Columbus, OH
Dec 21*; 7:30 pm, ESPN2	No. 3	vs. Notre Dame; Gotham Classic	W 64–61	12–0	Madison Square Garden (10,138); New York City, NY
Dec 27*; 7:00 pm, BTN	No. 3	Louisiana–Monroe	W 71–31	13–0	Value City Arena (18,534); Columbus, OH
Dec 31; 1:00 pm, ESPN2	No. 3	at Purdue	W 78–69	14–0 (1–0)	Mackey Arena (13,287); West Lafayette, IN
Jan 4; 12:00 pm, BTN	No. 3	Nebraska	W 84–53	15–0 (2–0)	Value City Arena (17,536); Columbus, OH
Jan 7; 9:00 pm, ESPN	No. 3	at No. 5 Michigan State	L 68–72 ^{OT}	15–1 (2–1)	Breslin Center (14,797); East Lansing, MI
Jan 12; 1:30 pm, CBS	No. 3	No. 20 Iowa	L 74–84	15–2 (2–2)	Value City Arena (18,809); Columbus, OH
Jan 16; 9:00 pm, ESPN2	No. 11	at Minnesota	L 53–63	15–3 (2–3)	Williams Arena (14,625); Minneapolis, MN
Jan 20; 7:00 pm, BTN	No. 17	at Nebraska	L 62–68	15–4 (2–4)	Pinnacle Bank Arena (15,342); Lincoln, NE
Jan 23; 7:00 pm, ESPN	No. 17	Illinois	W 62–55	16–4 (3–4)	Value City Arena (16,774); Columbus, OH
Jan 29; 7:00 pm, BTN	No. 24	Penn State	L 70–71	16–5 (3–5)	Value City Arena (15,453); Columbus, OH
Feb 1; 12:00 pm, ESPN	No. 24	at No. 14 Wisconsin	W 59–58	17–5 (4–5)	Kohl Center (17,249); Madison, WI
Feb 4; 7:00 pm, ESPN		at No. 17 Iowa	W 76–69	18–5 (5–5)	Carver-Hawkeye Arena (15,400); Iowa City, IA
Feb 8; 6:00 pm, BTN		Purdue	W 67–49	19–5 (6–5)	Value City Arena (18,809); Columbus, OH
Feb 11; 9:00 pm, ESPN	No. 22	No. 15 Michigan	L 60–70	19–6 (6–6)	Value City Arena (18,809); Columbus, OH
Feb 15; 8:00 pm, BTN	No. 22	at Illinois	W 48–39	20–6 (7–6)	State Farm Center (16,618); Champaign, IL
Feb 19; 7:00 pm, BTN	No. 24	Northwestern	W 76–60	21–6 (8–6)	Value City Arena (15,878); Columbus, OH
Feb 22; 6:00 pm, BTN	No. 24	Minnesota	W 64–46	22–6 (9–6)	Value City Arena (18,809); Columbus, OH
Feb 27; 7:00 pm, ESPN2	No. 22	at Penn State	L 63–65	22–7 (9–7)	Bryce Jordan Center (8,736); University Park, PA
Mar 2; 4:00 pm, CBS	No. 22	at Indiana	L 64–72	22–8 (9–8)	Assembly Hall (17,472); Bloomington, IN
Mar 9; 4:30 pm, CBS		No. 22 Michigan State	W 69–67	23–8 (10–8)	Value City Arena (18,809); Columbus, OH
Big Ten tournament
Mar 13; 2:30 pm, BTN	No. 24	vs. Purdue; First round	W 63–61	24–8	Bankers Life Fieldhouse (N/A); Indianapolis, IN
Mar 14; 2:30 pm, ESPN	No. 24	vs. Nebraska; Quarterfinals	W 71–67	25–8	Bankers Life Fieldhouse (N/A); Indianapolis, IN
Mar 15; 1:40 pm, CBS	No. 24	vs. No. 8 Michigan; Semifinals	L 69–72	25–9	Bankers Life Fieldhouse (N/A); Indianapolis, IN
NCAA tournament
Mar 20*; 12:15 pm, CBS	No. 22 (6 S)	vs. No. (11 S) Dayton; Second round	L 59–60	25–10	First Niagara Center (19,260); Buffalo, NY
*Non-conference game. ^{#}Rankings from AP Poll. (#) Tournament seedings in parentheses. All times are in Eastern Time. (#) denotes seed within region S=South.

== Rankings ==
Legend: ██ Increase in ranking. ██ Decrease in ranking.
Poll	Pre	Wk 2	Wk 3	Wk 4	Wk 5	Wk 6	Wk 7	Wk 8	Wk 9	Wk 10	Wk 11	Wk 12	Wk 13	Wk 14	Wk 15	Wk 16	Wk 17	Wk 18	Wk 19	Wk 20	Final
AP	11	10	8	7	5	3	3	3	3	3	11	17	24	RV	22	24	22	RV	24	22	N/A
Coaches	10	9	8	6	3	2	2т	3	3	3	9	15	23	25	20	23	20	RV	24	24	RV

== See also ==
- 2013–14 Ohio State Buckeyes women's basketball team
