= 2013–14 Purdue Boilermakers men's basketball team =

American college basketball season

2013–14 Purdue Boilermakers men's basketball
- Conference: Big Ten Conference
- Record: 15–17 (5–13 Big Ten)
- Head coach: Matt Painter (9th Season)
- Assistant coaches: Jack Owens; Brandon Brantley; Greg Gary
- Home arena: Mackey Arena

2013–14 Big Ten Conference men's basketball standings
	Conf.				Overall
Team	W		L	PCT	W		L	PCT
No. 7 Michigan	15	–	3	.833	28	–	9	.757
No. 12 Wisconsin	12	–	6	.667	30	–	8	.789
No. 11 Michigan State†	12	–	6	.667	29	–	9	.763
Nebraska	11	–	7	.611	19	–	13	.594
No. 22 Ohio State	10	–	8	.556	25	–	10	.714
Iowa	9	–	9	.500	20	–	13	.606
Minnesota	8	–	10	.444	25	–	13	.658
Illinois	7	–	11	.389	20	–	15	.571
Indiana	7	–	11	.389	17	–	15	.531
Penn State	6	–	12	.333	16	–	18	.471
Northwestern	6	–	12	.333	14	–	19	.424
Purdue	5	–	13	.278	15	–	17	.469
† 2014 Big Ten tournament winner Rankings from AP poll

The 2013–14 Purdue Boilermakers men's basketball team represented Purdue University. The head coach is Matt Painter, in his ninth season with the Boilers. The team played its home games in Mackey Arena in West Lafayette, Indiana, U.S., and was a member of the Big Ten Conference. They finished the season 15–17, 5–13 in Big Ten play to finish in last place. They lost in the first round of the Big Ten tournament to Ohio State.

As of 2025, this remains the last non-cancelled NCAA Tournament that Purdue missed.

== Roster ==
2013–14 Purdue Boilermakers men's basketball team
Players
Coaches

Pos.	#	Name	Height	Weight	Year	Hometown
G	0	Terone Johnson	6 ft 2 in (1.88 m)	199 lb (90 kg)	Sr	Indianapolis, IN
G	1	Sterling Carter	6 ft 0 in (1.83 m)	200 lb (91 kg)	RS Sr	Seattle, WA
G	2	Jon McKeeman	6 ft 1 in (1.85 m)	175 lb (79 kg)	So	Fort Wayne, IN
G	3	Ronnie Johnson	6 ft 0 in (1.83 m)	175 lb (79 kg)	So	Indianapolis, IN
F	5	Basil Smotherman	6 ft 5 in (1.96 m)	220 lb (100 kg)	Fr	Indianapolis, IN
G	11	Stephen Toyra	6 ft 3 in (1.91 m)	175 lb (79 kg)	So	Lafayette, IN
G	12	Bryson Scott	6 ft 1 in (1.85 m)	200 lb (91 kg)	Fr	Fort Wayne, IN
C	20	A. J. Hammons	7 ft 0 in (2.13 m)	256 lb (116 kg)	So	Carmel, IN
G	21	Kendall Stephens	6 ft 5 in (1.96 m)	185 lb (84 kg)	Fr	St. Charles, IL
F	23	Jay Simpson	6 ft 9 in (2.06 m)	250 lb (113 kg)	RS Fr	Champaign, IL
F	30	Neal Beshears	6 ft 6 in (1.98 m)	195 lb (88 kg)	Jr	Winchester, IN
F	32	Errick Peck	6 ft 6 in (1.98 m)	223 lb (101 kg)	RS Sr	Indianapolis, IN
G	35	Raphael Davis	6 ft 5 in (1.96 m)	211 lb (96 kg)	So	Fort Wayne, IN
F	50	Travis Carroll	6 ft 9 in (2.06 m)	245 lb (111 kg)	Sr	Danville, IN

Head coach

Matt Painter (Purdue)

Assistant coach(es)

Jack Owens (Eastern Illinois)
Greg Gary (Tulane)
Brandon Brantley (Purdue)

Legend

- (C) Team captain
- (S) Suspended
- (I) Ineligible
- (W) Walk-on
- Injured
- Current redshirt

Roster
Last update: 2013-08-18

=== Incoming recruits ===
College recruiting information
Name	Hometown	School	Height	Weight	Commit date
Bryson Scott; PG	Fort Wayne, IN	Northrop High School	6 ft 1 in (1.85 m)	170 lb (77 kg)	Nov 28, 2010
Bryson Scott; PG	Recruit ratings: Scout: Rivals: (77)				
Basil Smotherman; SF	Indianapolis, IN	Lawrence North High School	6 ft 6 in (1.98 m)	190 lb (86 kg)	Feb 16, 2011
Basil Smotherman; SF	Recruit ratings: Scout: Rivals: (78)				
Kendall Stephens; SG	St. Charles, IL	St. Charles East High School	6 ft 5 in (1.96 m)	180 lb (82 kg)	Feb 14, 2011
Kendall Stephens; SG	Recruit ratings: Scout: Rivals: (86)				
Overall recruit ranking: Rivals: 27
Note: In many cases, Scout, Rivals, 247Sports, On3, and ESPN may conflict in their listings of height and weight.; In these cases, the average was taken. ESPN grades are on a 100-point scale.; Sources: "2013 Purdue Signees". Rivals.; "2013 Purdue Signees". Scout.; "2013 Purdue Signees". ESPN.; "Scout.com Team Recruiting Rankings". Scout.; "2013 Team Ranking". Rivals.

== Schedule ==
Date time, TV	Rank^{#}	Opponent^{#}	Result	Record	Site (attendance) city, state
Exhibition
Oct 30*; 7:00 pm		Indianapolis	W 80–73	–	Mackey Arena (12,178); West Lafayette, IN
Nov 4*; 7:00 pm		Wayne State	W 91–58	–	Mackey Arena (11,911); West Lafayette, IN
Non-conference regular season
Nov 8*; 7:00 pm, ESPN3		Northern Kentucky	W 76–75	1-0	Mackey Arena (13,033); West Lafayette, IN
Nov 13*; 7:00 pm		Central Connecticut	W 109–73	2–0	Mackey Arena (11,966); West Lafayette, IN
Nov 17*; 7:00 pm, BTN		Rider	W 81–77	3–0	Mackey Arena (12,086); West Lafayette, IN
Nov 20*; 7:00 pm		Eastern Illinois	W 83–55	4–0	Mackey Arena (12,141); West Lafayette, IN
Nov 24*; 12:00 pm, BTN		Siena; Old Spice Classic Opening Round	W 81–73	5–0	Mackey Arena (12,898); West Lafayette, IN
Nov 28*; 12:00 pm, ESPN2		vs. No. 5 Oklahoma State; Old Spice Classic First Round	L 87–97	5–1	HP Field House (4,255); Orlando, FL
Nov 29*; 11:00 am, ESPNU		vs. Washington State; Old Spice Classic Consolation 2nd Round	L 54–69	5–2	HP Field House (N/A); Orlando, FL
Dec 1*; 5:00 pm, ESPN3		vs. Siena; Old Spice Classic 7th place game	W 68–63	6–2	HP Field House (N/A); Orlando, FL
Dec 4*; 9:00 pm, ESPN2		Boston College; ACC – Big Ten Challenge	W 88–67	7–2	Mackey Arena (12,926); West Lafayette, IN
Dec 7*; 2:00 pm, ESPN3		Eastern Michigan	W 69–64	8–2	Mackey Arena (13,079); West Lafayette, IN
Dec 14*; 6:00 pm, BTN		vs. Butler; Crossroads Classic	L 70–76	8–3	Bankers Life Fieldhouse (18,165); Indianapolis, IN
Dec 17*; 7:00 pm, ESPN3		Maryland Eastern Shore	W 79–50	9–3	Mackey Arena (8,081); West Lafayette, IN
Dec 22*; 1:00 pm, ESPNU		at West Virginia	W 73–70	10–3	WVU Coliseum (10,019); Morgantown, WV
Big Ten regular season
Dec 31; 1:00 pm, ESPN2		No. 3 Ohio State	L 69–78	10–4 (0–1)	Mackey Arena (13,287); West Lafayette, IN
Jan 5; 2:30 pm, BTN		at Minnesota	L 79–82	10–5 (0–2)	Williams Arena (11,851); Minneapolis, MN
Jan 12; 12:00 pm, BTN		Nebraska	W 70–64	11–5 (1–2)	Mackey Arena (9,182); West Lafayette, IN
Jan 15; 9:00 pm, BTN		at Illinois	W 66–58	12–5 (2–2)	State Farm Center (15,007); Champaign, IL
Jan 18; 7:00 pm, ESPNU		Penn State	W 65–64	13–5 (3–2)	Mackey Arena (14,124); West Lafayette, IN
Jan 21; 9:00 pm, BTN		at Northwestern	L 60–63 ^{2OT}	13–6 (3–3)	Welsh-Ryan Arena (6,063); Evanston, IL
Jan 25; 5:00 pm, BTN		No. 9 Wisconsin	L 58–72	13–7 (3–4)	Mackey Arena (14,845); West Lafayette, IN
Jan 30; 9:00 pm, ESPN		at No. 10 Michigan	L 66–75	13–8 (3–5)	Crisler Center (12,707); Ann Arbor, MI
Feb 2; 11:30 am, BTN		at Penn State	L 68–79	13–9 (3–6)	Bryce Jordan Center (7,832); University Park, PA
Feb 5; 8:30 pm, BTN		Minnesota	W 77–74 ^{3OT}	14–9 (4–6)	Mackey Arena (12,818); West Lafayette, IN
Feb 8; 6:00 pm, BTN		at Ohio State	L 49–67	14–10 (4–7)	Value City Arena (18,809); Columbus, OH
Feb 15; 4:00 pm, ESPN		Indiana; Crimson and Gold Cup	W 82–64	15–10 (5–7)	Mackey Arena (14,846); West Lafayette, IN
Feb 20; 7:00 pm, ESPN		No. 13 Michigan State	L 79–94	15–11 (5–8)	Mackey Arena (14,088); West Lafayette, IN
Feb 23; 4:15 pm, BTN		at Nebraska	L 57–76	15–12 (5–9)	Pinnacle Bank Arena (15,891); Lincoln, NE
Feb 26; 7:00 pm, BTN		No. 16 Michigan	L 76–77 ^{OT}	15–13 (5–10)	Mackey Arena (13,821); West Lafayette, IN
Mar 1; 8:15 pm, BTN		at No. 20 Iowa	L 76–83	15–14 (5–11)	Carver-Hawkeye Arena (15,400); Iowa City, IA
Mar 5; 9:00 pm, BTN		at No. 9 Wisconsin	L 70–76	15–15 (5–12)	Kohl Center (17,249); Madison, WI
Mar 8; 12:00 pm, BTN		Northwestern	L 65–74	15–16 (5–13)	Mackey Arena (13,332); West Lafayette, IN
Big Ten tournament
Mar 13; 2:30 pm, BTN	(12)	vs. (5) No. 24 Ohio State; First round	L 61–63	15–17	Bankers Life Fieldhouse; Indianapolis, IN
*Non-conference game. ^{#}Rankings from Coaches' Poll. (#) Tournament seedings in parentheses. All times are in Eastern Time.

== See also ==
- 2013–14 Purdue Boilermakers women's basketball team
