= 2013–14 Nebraska Cornhuskers men's basketball team =

American college basketball season

2013–14 Nebraska Cornhuskers men's basketball

NCAA tournament, round of 64
- Conference: Big Ten Conference
- Record: 19–13 (11–7 Big Ten)
- Head coach: Tim Miles (2nd Season)
- Assistant coaches: Chris Harriman (2nd Season); Craig Smith (2nd Season); Kenya Hunter (1st Season)
- Home arena: Pinnacle Bank Arena

2013–14 Big Ten Conference men's basketball standings
	Conf.				Overall
Team	W		L	PCT	W		L	PCT
No. 7 Michigan	15	–	3	.833	28	–	9	.757
No. 12 Wisconsin	12	–	6	.667	30	–	8	.789
No. 11 Michigan State†	12	–	6	.667	29	–	9	.763
Nebraska	11	–	7	.611	19	–	13	.594
No. 22 Ohio State	10	–	8	.556	25	–	10	.714
Iowa	9	–	9	.500	20	–	13	.606
Minnesota	8	–	10	.444	25	–	13	.658
Illinois	7	–	11	.389	20	–	15	.571
Indiana	7	–	11	.389	17	–	15	.531
Penn State	6	–	12	.333	16	–	18	.471
Northwestern	6	–	12	.333	14	–	19	.424
Purdue	5	–	13	.278	15	–	17	.469
† 2014 Big Ten tournament winner Rankings from AP poll

The 2013–14 Nebraska Cornhuskers men's basketball team represented the University of Nebraska–Lincoln in the 2013–14 NCAA Division I men's basketball season. Led by head coach Tim Miles, in his second season, the Cornhuskers team played its home games in the brand new Pinnacle Bank Arena in downtown Lincoln, Nebraska, and were a member of the Big Ten Conference. They finished the season with a record 19–13 overall, 11–7 in Big Ten play for a 4th-place finish, despite being predicted by many to finish last in the conference. They lost in the quarterfinals in the 2014 Big Ten Conference men's basketball tournament to Ohio State. They received at-large bid to the 2014 NCAA Division I men's basketball tournament for the first time since 1998. They lost in the first round to Baylor.

== Departures from previous season ==
Name	Number	Pos.	Height	Weight	Year	Hometown	Notes
Brandon Ubel	13	F	6'10"	235	Senior	Overland Park, KS	Graduated
Dylan Talley	24	G	6'5"	214	Senior	Camden, NJ	Graduated
Andre Almeida	32	C	6'11"	310	RS Senior	São Paulo, BRA	Graduated

== Incoming recruits ==
College recruiting
Name	Hometown	School	Height	Weight	Commit date
Nick Fuller; SG	Sun Prairie, WI	Sun Prairie	6 ft 7 in (2.01 m)	185 lb (84 kg)	Aug 10, 2012
Nick Fuller; SG	Recruit ratings: Scout: Rivals: (79)				
Tai Webster; PG	Auckland, NZ	Westlake Boys	6 ft 3 in (1.91 m)	185 lb (84 kg)	Aug 21, 2012
Tai Webster; PG	Recruit ratings: Scout: Rivals: (79)				
Nathan Hawkins; SG	Rowlett, TX	Rowlett	6 ft 5 in (1.96 m)	190 lb (86 kg)	Aug 10, 2012
Nathan Hawkins; SG	Recruit ratings: Scout: Rivals: (72)				
Leslee Smith; PF	Liberal, KS	Seward County CC	6 ft 8 in (2.03 m)	250 lb (110 kg)	Apr 1, 2013
Leslee Smith; PF	Recruit ratings: Scout: Rivals: (N/A)				
Overall recruit ranking:
Note: In many cases, Scout, Rivals, 247Sports, On3, and ESPN may conflict in their listings of height and weight.; In these cases, the average was taken. ESPN grades are on a 100-point scale.; Sources: "2013 Team Ranking". Rivals.

Tim Wagner, a 6-3 guard from Galesville, Wisconsin joined the team as a walk-on.

== Roster ==
2013–14 Nebraska Cornhuskers men's basketball team
Players
Coaches
}

Pos.	#	Name	Height	Weight	Year	Hometown
G	0	Tai Webster	6 ft 3 in (1.91 m)	196 lb (89 kg)	Fr	Auckland, NZ
G	2	David Rivers	6 ft 7 in (2.01 m)	191 lb (87 kg)	Jr	Little Rock, AR
G	3	Benny Parker	5 ft 9 in (1.75 m)	164 lb (74 kg)	So	Kansas City, KS
G	4	Nathan Hawkins	6 ft 5 in (1.96 m)	186 lb (84 kg)	Fr	Garland, TX
F	5	Terran Petteway	6 ft 6 in (1.98 m)	200 lb (91 kg)	RS So	Galveston, TX
G	10	Trevor Menke (W)	5 ft 11 in (1.8 m)	176 lb (80 kg)	RS Jr	Beatrice, NE
F	11	Jordan Tyrance (W)	6 ft 3 in (1.91 m)	195 lb (88 kg)	RS Jr	Lincoln, NE
G	12	Mike Peltz (W)	6 ft 2 in (1.88 m)	199 lb (90 kg)	Sr	Alliance, NE
C	14	Sergej Vucetic	7 ft 1 in (2.16 m)	236 lb (107 kg)	So	Vrbas, SRB
G	15	Ray Gallegos	6 ft 2 in (1.88 m)	181 lb (82 kg)	RS Sr	Salt Lake City, UT
F	21	Leslee Smith	6 ft 8 in (2.03 m)	255 lb (116 kg)	Jr	Long Look, BVI
G	23	Nick Fuller	6 ft 6 in (1.98 m)	203 lb (92 kg)	Fr	Sun Prairie, WI
G	31	Shavon Shields	6 ft 6 in (1.98 m)	214 lb (97 kg)	So	Olathe, KS
G	33	Tim Wagner (W)	6 ft 3 in (1.91 m)	190 lb (86 kg)	Fr	Galesville, WI
F	35	Walter Pitchford	6 ft 10 in (2.08 m)	229 lb (104 kg)	RS So	Grand Rapids, MI
C	44	Kye Kurkowski (W)	6 ft 10 in (2.08 m)	214 lb (97 kg)	RS Jr	Grant, NE

Head coach

- Tim Miles (Mary)

Assistant coach(es)

- Chris Harriman (Augusta State)
- Craig Smith (North Dakota)
- Kenya Hunter (Duquesne)

Legend

- (C) Team captain
- (S) Suspended
- (I) Ineligible
- (W) Walk-on
- Injured
- Current redshirt

Roster
Last update: 2013-06-15

== Early departures ==
=== Jordan Tyrance ===
On November 5, 2013, just one day after the Cornhuskers defeated in-state opponent Nebraska-Kearney in an exhibition game, walk-on Jordan Tyrance informed head coach Tim Miles that he was leaving the team for personal reasons, stating, '"I just had some personal things that I needed to take care of. I love the sport, I mean collegiate sports get tough, and it's a big time commitment.'" Besides having balanced homework and practice, Tyrance was also caring for his two-year-old daughter Kyalinn. '"I had some family I need to spend time with, a daughter, and just needed to handle my home stuff. She's my life [and] she deserves to have a father that's around, and watching her grow up.'"

=== Deverell Biggs ===
Deverell Biggs did not play and was absent from the team during their win over Minnesota on January 26, 2013. Biggs tweeted that his absence was due to "personal reasons." On January 27, 2014 Head Coach Miles dismissed Biggs from the team. According to sources Biggs missed a film session on the day of the Minnesota game, but according to Miles, no single incident led to Biggs' dismissal.

Biggs was the first in-state recruit to sign with Nebraska in 10 seasons, but faced a number of disciplinary woes prior to his dismissal. In December 2012, during Biggs' redshirt season, he was cited for DUI and leaving the scene of an accident. That led to a two-game suspension to start the 2013-2014 season. Biggs didn't make the trip to Cincinnati on December 28, 2013 for disciplinary reasons after missing a film session. Biggs was also cited Jan. 5 by University of Nebraska-Lincoln police for running a stop sign and driving on a suspended license.

== Schedule ==
Date time, TV	Rank^{#}	Opponent^{#}	Result	Record	Site (attendance) city, state
Exhibition
Nov 4*; 7:00 pm		Nebraska-Kearney	W 91–60	–	Pinnacle Bank Arena (14,957); Lincoln, NE
Non-conference regular season
Nov 8*; 8:00 pm, BTN		Florida Gulf Coast	W 79–55	1–0	Pinnacle Bank Arena (15,119); Lincoln, NE
Nov 12*; 7:00 pm		Western Illinois	W 62–47	2–0	Pinnacle Bank Arena (14,771); Lincoln, NE
Nov 17*; 2:00 pm		South Carolina State	W 83–57	3–0	Pinnacle Bank Arena (14,765); Lincoln, NE
Nov 21*; 11:30 am, ESPN3		vs. Massachusetts; Charleston Classic First Round	L 90–96	3–1	TD Arena (1,873); Charleston, SC
Nov 22*; 12:00 pm, ESPN3		vs. UAB; Charleston Classic Consolation round	L 74–87	3–2	TD Arena (1,730); Charleston, SC
Nov 24*; 2:30 pm, ESPN3		vs. Georgia; Charleston Classic 7th place game	W 73–65	4–2	TD Arena (1,137); Charleston, SC
Nov 30*; 12:00 pm		Northern Illinois	W 63–58	5–2	Pinnacle Bank Arena (15,332); Lincoln, NE
Dec 4*; 8:30 pm, ESPNU		Miami (FL); ACC–Big Ten Challenge	W 60–49	6–2	Pinnacle Bank Arena (15,088); Lincoln, NE
Dec 8*; 5:00 pm, FS1		at Creighton; Rivalry	L 67–82	6–3	CenturyLink Center Omaha (17,530); Omaha, NE
Dec 14*; 3:00 pm, BTN		Arkansas State	W 79–67	7–3	Pinnacle Bank Arena (15,949); Lincoln, NE
Dec 21*; 7:30 pm		The Citadel	W 77–62	8–3	Pinnacle Bank Arena (14,978); Lincoln, NE
Dec 28*; 3:00 pm, ESPN2		at Cincinnati	L 59–74	8–4	Fifth Third Arena (8,254); Cincinnati, OH
Big Ten regular season
Dec 31; 6:00 pm, BTN		at No. 22 Iowa	L 57–67	8–5 (0–1)	Carver-Hawkeye Arena (15,400); Iowa City, IA
Jan 4; 11:00 am, BTN		at No. 3 Ohio State	L 53–84	8–6 (0–2)	Value City Arena (17,536); Columbus, OH
Jan 9; 8:00 pm, ESPN2		Michigan	L 70–71	8–7 (0–3)	Pinnacle Bank Arena (15,012); Lincoln, NE
Jan 12; 11:00 am, BTN		at Purdue	L 64–70	8–8 (0–4)	Mackey Arena (9,182); West Lafayette, IN
Jan 20; 6:00 pm, BTN		No. 17 Ohio State	W 68–62	9–8 (1–4)	Pinnacle Bank Arena (15,342); Lincoln, NE
Jan 23; 7:00 pm, ESPNU		at Penn State	L 54–58	9–9 (1–5)	Bryce Jordan Center (5,705); State College, PA
Jan 26; 5:00 pm, BTN		Minnesota	W 82–78	10–9 (2–5)	Pinnacle Bank Arena (15,945); Lincoln, NE
Jan 30; 7:15 pm, BTN		Indiana	W 60–55	11–9 (3–5)	Pinnacle Bank Arena (15,333); Lincoln, NE
Feb 5; 5:30 pm, BTN		at No. 10 Michigan	L 50–79	11–10 (3–6)	Crisler Center (12,707); Ann Arbor, MI
Feb 8; 12:00 pm, ESPNU		at Northwestern	W 53–49	12–10 (4–6)	Welsh-Ryan Arena (7,109); Evanston, IL
Feb 12; 8:00 pm, BTN		Illinois	W 67–58	13–10 (5–6)	Pinnacle Bank Arena (15,404); Lincoln, NE
Feb 16; 2:00 pm, BTN		at No. 9 Michigan State	W 60–51	14–10 (6–6)	Breslin Center (14,797); East Lansing, MI
Feb 20; 6:00 pm, ESPNU		Penn State	W 80–67	15–10 (7–6)	Pinnacle Bank Arena (15,797); Lincoln, NE
Feb 23; 3:15 pm, BTN		Purdue	W 76–57	16–10 (8–6)	Pinnacle Bank Arena (15,891); Lincoln, NE
Feb 26; 8:00 pm, BTN		at Illinois	L 49–60	16–11 (8–7)	State Farm Center (13,206); Champaign, IL
Mar 1; 4:00 pm, ESPNU		Northwestern	W 54–47	17–11 (9–7)	Pinnacle Bank Arena (15,978); Lincoln, NE
Mar 5; 6:00 pm, BTN		at Indiana	W 70–60	18–11 (10–7)	Assembly Hall (17,472); Bloomington, IN
Mar 9; 6:30 pm, BTN		No. 9 Wisconsin	W 77–68	19–11 (11–7)	Pinnacle Bank Arena (15,998); Lincoln, NE
Big Ten tournament
Mar 14; 1:30 pm, ESPN	(4)	vs. (5) No. 24 Ohio State; Quarterfinals	L 67–71	19–12	Bankers Life Fieldhouse (18,596); Indianapolis, IN
NCAA tournament
Mar 21*; 11:40 am, truTV	(11 W)	vs. (6 W) No. 23 Baylor; Second round	L 60–74	19–13	AT&T Center (12,895); San Antonio, TX
*Non-conference game. ^{#}Rankings from AP Poll, (#) is seed within region W=West. (#) Tournament seedings in parentheses. All times are in Central Time.

== See also ==
- 2013–14 Nebraska Cornhuskers women's basketball team
