= 2013–14 Iowa Hawkeyes men's basketball team =

American college basketball season

2013–14 Iowa Hawkeyes men's basketball

NCAA tournament, first round
- Conference: Big Ten Conference
- Record: 20–13 (9–9 Big Ten)
- Head coach: Fran McCaffery (4th season)
- Assistant coaches: Sherman Dillard; Andrew Francis; Kirk Speraw
- Home arena: Carver-Hawkeye Arena (Capacity: 15,400)

2013–14 Big Ten Conference men's basketball standings
	Conf.				Overall
Team	W		L	PCT	W		L	PCT
No. 7 Michigan	15	–	3	.833	28	–	9	.757
No. 12 Wisconsin	12	–	6	.667	30	–	8	.789
No. 11 Michigan State†	12	–	6	.667	29	–	9	.763
Nebraska	11	–	7	.611	19	–	13	.594
No. 22 Ohio State	10	–	8	.556	25	–	10	.714
Iowa	9	–	9	.500	20	–	13	.606
Minnesota	8	–	10	.444	25	–	13	.658
Illinois	7	–	11	.389	20	–	15	.571
Indiana	7	–	11	.389	17	–	15	.531
Penn State	6	–	12	.333	16	–	18	.471
Northwestern	6	–	12	.333	14	–	19	.424
Purdue	5	–	13	.278	15	–	17	.469
† 2014 Big Ten tournament winner Rankings from AP poll

The 2013–14 Iowa Hawkeyes men's basketball team represented the University of Iowa in the 2013–14 college basketball season. The team was led by fourth year head coach Fran McCaffery and played their home games at Carver-Hawkeye Arena. They were members of the Big Ten Conference. They finished the season 20–13, 9–9 in Big Ten play to finish in sixth place. They lost in the first round of the Big Ten tournament to Northwestern. They received an invitation to the NCAA Tournament where they lost Tennessee in the first four.

== Last season ==
The team finished the previous season with a record of 25–13, 9–9 in Big Ten play and finished 6th in the Big Ten. The 25 wins was the most wins in one season for the Hawkeyes since the 2005–2006 season, in which Iowa also had 25 wins. The team was invited to the 2013 National Invitation Tournament as a 3rd seed in the Virginia Bracket. The team advanced to the NIT Championship game but lost to Baylor. The Hawkeyes received 7 votes in the final USA Today Coaches Poll, making it the first time that Iowa had received votes in the coaches poll since 2006.

== Roster ==
The 2013-14 Iowa Hawkeyes squad contained 15 players which included 1 freshman, 1 redshirt freshman, 4 sophomores, 6 juniors, and 3 seniors.

2012–13 Iowa Hawkeyes men's basketball team
Players
Coaches

Pos.	#	Name	Height	Weight	Year	Hometown
C	0	Gabriel Olaseni	6 ft 10 in (2.08 m)	225 lb (102 kg)	Jr	London, England
F	1	Melsahn Basabe	6 ft 7 in (2.01 m)	220 lb (100 kg)	Sr	Glen Cove, NY
G	2	Josh Oglesby	6 ft 5 in (1.96 m)	208 lb (94 kg)	Jr	Cedar Rapids, IA
G	3	Peter Jok	6 ft 6 in (1.98 m)	200 lb (91 kg)	Fr	Des Moines, IA
G	4	Roy Devyn Marble (C)	6 ft 6 in (1.98 m)	200 lb (91 kg)	Sr	Southfield, MI
G	5	Anthony Clemmons	6 ft 1 in (1.85 m)	190 lb (86 kg)	So	Lansing, MI
G	10	Mike Gesell	6 ft 1 in (1.85 m)	190 lb (86 kg)	So	South Sioux City, NE
G	13	Kyle Denning (W)	6 ft 1 in (1.85 m)	160 lb (73 kg)	Jr	Cedar Falls, IA
F	15	Zach McCabe (C)	6 ft 7 in (2.01 m)	235 lb (107 kg)	Sr	Sioux City, IA
F	20	Jarrod Uthoff	6 ft 9 in (2.06 m)	208 lb (94 kg)	So	Cedar Rapids, IA
F	23	Okey Ukah (W)	6 ft 6 in (1.98 m)	210 lb (95 kg)	So	Iowa City, IA
F	30	Aaron White	6 ft 9 in (2.06 m)	220 lb (100 kg)	Jr	Strongsville, OH
C	34	Adam Woodbury	7 ft 1 in (2.16 m)	245 lb (111 kg)	So	Sioux City, IA
F	35	Darius Stokes	6 ft 7 in (2.01 m)	203 lb (92 kg)	Jr	Cedar Rapids, IA
F	42	Kyle Meyer	6 ft 10 in (2.08 m)	225 lb (102 kg)	RS Fr	Alpharetta, GA

Head coach

- Fran McCaffery

Assistant coach(es)

- Sherman Dillard
- Andrew Francis
- Kirk Speraw

Athletic trainer(s)

- Brad Floy

Legend

- (C) Team captain
- (S) Suspended
- (I) Ineligible
- (W) Walk-on
- Injured
- Current redshirt

Roster
Last update: 2013-11-3

== 2013 Commitments ==
College recruiting information
Name	Hometown	School	Height	Weight	Commit date
Peter Jok; SG	Des Moines, IA	Valley High School	6 ft 5 in (1.96 m)	188 lb (85 kg)	Sep 23, 2012
Peter Jok; SG	Recruit ratings: Scout: Rivals: ESPN: (76)				
Overall recruit ranking:
Note: In many cases, Scout, Rivals, 247Sports, On3, and ESPN may conflict in their listings of height and weight.; In these cases, the average was taken. ESPN grades are on a 100-point scale.; Sources: "ESPN- Iowa Hawkeyes Men's Basketball Recruiting". ESPN.; "2013 Team Ranking". Rivals.

== Schedule and results ==
Date time, TV	Rank^{#}	Opponent^{#}	Result	Record	Site (attendance) city, state
Exhibition
Nov 3*; 3:30 pm		Augustana	W 87–65		Carver-Hawkeye Arena (15,400); Iowa City, IA
Non-conference regular season
Nov 8*; 8:30 pm, ESPN3		UNC Wilmington	W 82–39	1–0	Carver-Hawkeye Arena (15,293); Iowa City, IA
Nov 10*; 3:30 pm, ESPN3		Nebraska–Omaha	W 83–75	2–0	Carver-Hawkeye Arena (14,271); Iowa City, IA
Nov 14*; 6:00 pm, BTN		UMES	W 109–63	3–0	Carver-Hawkeye Arena (13,374); Iowa City, IA
Nov 17*; 3:30 pm		Abilene Christian; Battle 4 Atlantis Opening Round	W 103–41	4–0	Carver-Hawkeye Arena (14,733); Iowa City, IA
Nov 22*; 6:00 pm, BTN		Penn	W 86–55	5–0	Carver-Hawkeye Arena (15,400); Iowa City, IA
Nov 28*; 6:00 pm, NBCSN	No. 23	vs. Xavier; Battle 4 Atlantis First Round	W 77–74 ^{OT}	6–0	Imperial Arena (2,258); Nassau, BAH
Nov 29*; 6:00 pm, NBCSN	No. 23	vs. UTEP; Battle 4 Atlantis Semifinals	W 89–53	7–0	Imperial Arena (2,664); Nassau, BAH
Nov 30*; 8:30 pm, NBCSN	No. 23	vs. Villanova; Battle 4 Atlantis Championship	L 83–88 ^{OT}	7–1	Imperial Arena (2,593); Nassau, BAH
Dec 3*; 8:15 pm, ESPN2	No. 23	Notre Dame; ACC–Big Ten Challenge	W 98–93	8–1	Carver-Hawkeye Arena (15,400); Iowa City, IA
Dec 7*; 7:30 pm	No. 23	vs. Drake; Big Four Classic	W 83–66	9–1	Wells Fargo Arena (14,512); Des Moines, IA
Dec 9*; 6:00 pm, BTN	No. 23	Fairleigh Dickinson	W 92–59	10–1	Carver-Hawkeye Arena (13,501); Iowa City, IA
Dec 13*; 8:30 pm, ESPNU	No. 23	at No. 17 Iowa State; Iowa Corn Cy-Hawk Series	L 82–85	10–2	Hilton Coliseum (14,384); Ames, IA
Dec 22*; 1:00 pm, ESPN3	No. 25	Arkansas–Pine Bluff	W 86–61	11–2	Carver-Hawkeye Arena (15,400); Iowa City, IA
Big Ten regular season
Dec 31; 6:00 pm, BTN	No. 22	Nebraska	W 67–57	12–2 (1–0)	Carver-Hawkeye Arena (15,400); Iowa City, IA
Jan 5; 7:00 pm, BTN	No. 22	at No. 4 Wisconsin	L 71–75	12–3 (1–1)	Kohl Center (17,249); Madison, WI
Jan 9; 8:00 pm, ESPNU	No. 20	Northwestern	W 93–67	13–3 (2–1)	Carver-Hawkeye Arena (14,016); Iowa City, IA
Jan 12; 12:30 pm, CBS	No. 20	at No. 3 Ohio State	W 84–74	14–3 (3–1)	Value City Arena (18,809); Columbus, OH
Jan 19; 12:00 pm, BTN	No. 14	Minnesota	W 94–73	15–3 (4–1)	Carver-Hawkeye Arena (15,400); Iowa City, IA
Jan 22; 6:00 pm, BTN	No. 10	at No. 21 Michigan	L 67–75	15–4 (4–2)	Crisler Center (12,707); Ann Arbor, MI
Jan 25; 11:00 am, BTN	No. 10	at Northwestern	W 76–50	16–4 (5–2)	Welsh-Ryan Arena (8,117); Evanston, IL
Jan 28; 6:00 pm, ESPN	No. 15	No. 7 Michigan State	L 69–71 ^{OT}	16–5 (5–3)	Carver-Hawkeye Arena (15,400); Iowa City, IA
Feb 1; 6:30 pm, BTN	No. 15	at Illinois	W 81–74	17–5 (6–3)	State Farm Center (16,618); Champaign, IL
Feb 4; 6:00 pm, ESPN	No. 17	Ohio State	L 69–76	17–6 (6–4)	Carver-Hawkeye Arena (15,400); Iowa City, IA
Feb 8; 1:00 pm, ESPN	No. 17	No. 10 Michigan	W 85–67	18–6 (7–4)	Carver-Hawkeye Arena (15,400); Iowa City, IA
Feb 15; 12:00 pm, ESPNU	No. 16	at Penn State	W 82–70	19–6 (8–4)	Bryce Jordan Center (10,428); University Park, PA
Feb 22; 11:00 am, ESPN2	No. 15	No. 16 Wisconsin	L 74–79	19–7 (8–5)	Carver-Hawkeye Arena (15,400); Iowa City, IA
Feb 25; 6:00 pm, BTN	No. 20	at Minnesota	L 89–95	19–8 (8–6)	Williams Arena (14,625); Minneapolis, MN
Feb 27; 8:00 pm, ESPN	No. 20	at Indiana^	L 86–93	19–9 (8–7)	Assembly Hall (17,472); Bloomington, IN
Mar 2; 1:00 pm, BTN	No. 20	Purdue	W 83–76	20–9 (9–7)	Carver-Hawkeye Arena (15,400); Iowa City, IA
Mar 6; 8:00 pm, ESPN	No. 24	at No. 22 Michigan State	L 76–86	20–10 (9–8)	Breslin Center (14,797); East Lansing, MI
Mar 8; 7:30 pm, BTN	No. 24	Illinois	L 63–66	20–11 (9–9)	Carver-Hawkeye Arena (15,400); Iowa City, IA
Big Ten tournament
Mar 13; 8:00 pm, ESPN2		vs. Northwestern; First round	L 62–67	20–12	Bankers Life Fieldhouse (N/A); Indianapolis, IN
NCAA tournament
Mar 19*; 8:10 pm, truTV	(11 MW)	vs. (11 MW) Tennessee; First Four	L 65–78 ^{OT}	20–13	University of Dayton Arena (11,534); Dayton, OH
*Non-conference game. ^{#}Rankings from AP Poll. (#) Tournament seedings in parentheses. MW=Midwest region. All times are in Central Time.

^ This game was originally scheduled for February 18, but was postponed due to safety concerns following a piece of metal falling from the roof at Assembly Hall.

- Source: Schedule

== Rankings ==
Ranking movement Legend: ██ Increase in ranking. ██ Decrease in ranking.
Poll	Pre	Wk 2	Wk 3	Wk 4	Wk 5	Wk 6	Wk 7	Wk 8	Wk 9	Wk 10	Wk 11	Wk 12	Wk 13	Wk 14	Wk 15	Wk 16	Wk 17	Wk 18	Wk 19	Wk 20	Final
AP	RV	RV	RV	23	23	23	25	22	22	20	14	10	15	17	16	15	20	24	RV	NR	N/A
Coaches	RV	RV	25	23	24	22	RV	23	23	23т	16	10	12	13	15	15	19	25	RV	RV	NR
