= 2013–14 Penn State Nittany Lions basketball team =

American college basketball season

2013–14 Penn State Nittany Lions basketball

CBI Quarterfinals vs. Siena, L 52–54
- Conference: Big Ten Conference
- Record: 16–18 (6–12 Big Ten)
- Head coach: Pat Chambers
- Assistant coaches: Eugene Burroughs; Brian Daly; Dwayne Anderson
- Home arena: Bryce Jordan Center

2013–14 Big Ten Conference men's basketball standings
	Conf.				Overall
Team	W		L	PCT	W		L	PCT
No. 7 Michigan	15	–	3	.833	28	–	9	.757
No. 12 Wisconsin	12	–	6	.667	30	–	8	.789
No. 11 Michigan State†	12	–	6	.667	29	–	9	.763
Nebraska	11	–	7	.611	19	–	13	.594
No. 22 Ohio State	10	–	8	.556	25	–	10	.714
Iowa	9	–	9	.500	20	–	13	.606
Minnesota	8	–	10	.444	25	–	13	.658
Illinois	7	–	11	.389	20	–	15	.571
Indiana	7	–	11	.389	17	–	15	.531
Penn State	6	–	12	.333	16	–	18	.471
Northwestern	6	–	12	.333	14	–	19	.424
Purdue	5	–	13	.278	15	–	17	.469
† 2014 Big Ten tournament winner Rankings from AP poll

The 2013–14 Penn State Nittany Lions basketball team represented Pennsylvania State University. Head coach Pat Chambers was in his third season with the team. The team played its home games in University Park, Pennsylvania at the Bryce Jordan Center as a member of the Big Ten Conference. They finished the season 16–18, 6–12 in Big Ten play to finish in a tie for tenth place. They lost in the first round of the Big Ten tournament to Minnesota. They were invited to the College Basketball Invitational where they defeated Hampton in the first round before losing in the quarterfinals to Siena.

== Departures ==
Name	Number	Pos.	Height	Weight	Year	Hometown	Notes
Sasa Borovnjak	21	F	6'9"	225	RS Junior	Belgrade, Serbia	Graduated, decided to forgo fifth year of eligibility
Nick Colella	20	SG	6'3"	195	Senior	New Castle, Pennsylvania	Graduated
Jermaine Marshall	11	SG	6'4"	200	RS Junior	Etters, Pennsylvania	Graduate Transfer to Arizona State
Jon Graham	25	F	6'8"	240	RS Sophomore	Baltimore, Maryland	Transfer
Patrick Ackerman	32	C	6'11"	230	Freshman	Rutland, Massachusetts	Transfer
Akosa Maduegbunam	1	SG	6'3"	200	Freshman	Boston, Massachusetts	Transfer

== Personnel ==
=== Roster ===
2013–14 Penn State Nittany Lions men's basketball team
Players
Coaches

Pos.	#	Name	Height	Weight	Year	Previous school	Hometown
F	0	Payton Banks	6 ft 6 in (1.98 m)	220 lb (100 kg)	Fr	Lutheran High School of Orange County	Orange, California
G	1	John Johnson	6 ft 1 in (1.85 m)	175 lb (79 kg)	Jr	Life Center Academy / Pittsburgh	Philadelphia, Pennsylvania
G	2	D. J. Newbill	6 ft 4 in (1.93 m)	205 lb (93 kg)	RS Jr	Strawberry Mansion High School	Philadelphia, Pennsylvania
G	3	Graham Woodward	6 ft 0 in (1.83 m)	170 lb (77 kg)	Fr	Edina High School	Edina, Minnesota
F	5	Donovan Jack	6 ft 9 in (2.06 m)	210 lb (95 kg)	So	Berks Catholic High School	Reading, Pennsylvania
F	10	Brandon Taylor	6 ft 7 in (2.01 m)	235 lb (107 kg)	So	Trenton Catholic Academy	Tabernacle, New Jersey
G	11	Allen Roberts	6 ft 3 in (1.91 m)	214 lb (97 kg)	Sr	Middletown High School (Ohio) / Miami (OH)	Middletown, Ohio
G	13	Geno Thorpe	6 ft 3 in (1.91 m)	180 lb (82 kg)	Fr	Shaler Area High School	Pittsburgh, Pennsylvania
G	14	Kevin Montminy	6 ft 3 in (1.91 m)	185 lb (84 kg)	Jr	Penns Valley Area	Centre Hall, Pennsylvania
G	23	Tim Frazier	6 ft 1 in (1.85 m)	170 lb (77 kg)	RS Sr	Strake Jesuit College Preparatory	Houston, Texas
G	24	Zach Cooper	6 ft 1 in (1.85 m)	175 lb (79 kg)	Sr	Urbana High School (Maryland)	Ijamsville, Maryland
C	25	Jordan Dickerson	7 ft 0 in (2.13 m)	240 lb (109 kg)	So	IMG Academy / Abraham Lincoln / SMU	Brooklyn, New York
F	34	Alan Wisniewski	6 ft 9 in (2.06 m)	230 lb (104 kg)	Sr	Bishop Foley Catholic High School	Sterling Heights, Michigan
F	35	Kevin Onyeaka	6 ft 5 in (1.96 m)	205 lb (93 kg)	Sr	Central Dauphin East High School	Harrisburg, Pennsylvania
F	43	Ross Travis	6 ft 6 in (1.98 m)	225 lb (102 kg)	Jr	Chaska High School	Chaska, Minnesota
F	44	Julian Moore	6 ft 10 in (2.08 m)	215 lb (98 kg)	Fr	Germantown Academy	Fort Washington, Pennsylvania

Head coach

- Pat Chambers (Philadelphia)

Assistant coach(es)

- Keith Urgo (Fairfield)
- Brian Daly (Saint Joseph's)
- Dwayne Anderson (Villanova)

Legend

- (C) Team captain
- (S) Suspended
- (I) Ineligible
- (W) Walk-on
- Injured
- Current redshirt

Roster

=== Coaching staff ===
Position	Name	Year	Alma mater
Head coach	Patrick Chambers	2011	Philadelphia University (1994)
Associate head coach	Keith Urgo	2011	Fairfield University (2002)
Associate head coach	Brian Daly	2011	St. Joseph's University (1992)
Assistant coach	Dwayne Anderson	2013	Villanova University (2009)
Director of Basketball Operations	Ross Condon	2011	Villanova University (2007)
On campus recruiting coordinator	David Caporaletti	2011	Philadelphia University (1993)
Athletic trainer	Jon Salazer	2001	Penn State (1993)
Director of player development	Ryan Devlin	2013	Philadelphia University (2005)
Strength and conditioning coach	Brandon Spayd	2013	Juniata College (2010)
Graduate Manager	Nicholas Colella	2013	Penn State (2013)
Graduate Manager	Andrew Jones III	2013	Penn State (2011)

== Schedule and results ==
Date time, TV	Opponent	Result	Record	Site (attendance) city, state
Exhibition
Nov 3*; 2:00 p.m.	Northwood	W 98–61	—	Bryce Jordan Center (4,049); University Park, PA
Non-conference regular season
Nov 9*; 4:00 p.m.	Wagner	W 74–62	1–0	Bryce Jordan Center (4,752); University Park, PA
Nov 13*; 7:00 p.m.	Bucknell	L 80–90	1–1	Bryce Jordan Center (4,670); University Park, PA
Nov 16*; 2:00 p.m.	at Penn	W 83–71	2–1	Palestra (4,130); Philadelphia, PA
Nov 19*; 7:00 p.m., ESPN3	La Salle	W 79–72	3–1	Bryce Jordan Center (4,240); University Park, PA
Nov 24*; 1:00 p.m.	Longwood; Barclays Center Classic	W 93–67	4–1	Bryce Jordan Center (4,261); University Park, PA
Nov 26*; 6:00 p.m., BTN	Monmouth; Barclays Center Classic	W 84–52	5–1	Bryce Jordan Center (3,912); University Park, PA
Nov 29*; 7:00 p.m.	vs. St. John's; Barclays Center Classic semifinals	W 89–82 ^{OT}	6–1	Barclays Center (4,231); Brooklyn, NY
Nov 30*; 4:30 p.m., NBCSN	vs. Ole Miss; Barclays Center Classic championship	L 76–79	6–2	Barclays Center (3,088); Brooklyn, NY
Dec 3*; 7:30 p.m., ESPNU	at Pittsburgh; ACC–Big Ten Challenge	L 69–78	6–3	Petersen Events Center (12,510); Pittsburgh, PA
Dec 7*; 4:00 p.m., ESPN3	Marshall	W 90–77	7–3	Bryce Jordan Center (5,633); University Park, PA
Dec 11*; 7:00 p.m.	at Duquesne	W 68–59	8–3	Consol Energy Center (5,246); Pittsburgh, PA
Dec 14*; 2:00 p.m., BTN	Princeton	L 79–81 ^{OT}	8–4	Rec Hall (6,188); University Park, PA
Dec 22*; 2:00 p.m., BTN	Mount St. Mary's	W 92–82	9–4	Bryce Jordan Center (8,284); University Park, PA
Big Ten regular season
Dec 31; 5:00 p.m., BTN	No. 5 Michigan State	L 63–79	9–5 (0–1)	Bryce Jordan Center (7,397); University Park, PA
Jan 4; 2:15 p.m., BTN	at Illinois	L 55–75	9–6 (0–2)	State Farm Center (15,390); Champaign, IL
Jan 8; 7:00 p.m., BTN	Minnesota	L 65–68	9–7 (0–3)	Bryce Jordan Center (5,010); University Park, PA
Jan 11; 12:00 p.m., BTN	Indiana	L 76–79	9–8 (0–4)	Bryce Jordan Center (8,079); University Park, PA
Jan 14; 8:00 p.m., BTN	at Michigan	L 67–80	9–9 (0–5)	Crisler Arena (12,707); Ann Arbor, MI
Jan 18; 7:00 p.m., ESPNU	at Purdue	L 64–65	9–10 (0–6)	Mackey Arena (14,124); West Lafayette, IN
Jan 23; 8:00 p.m., ESPNU	Nebraska	W 58–54	10–10 (1–6)	Bryce Jordan Center (5,705); University Park, PA
Jan 29; 7:00 p.m., BTN	at No. 24 Ohio State	W 71–70 ^{OT}	11–10 (2–6)	Value City Arena (15,453); Columbus, OH
Feb 2; 11:30 a.m., BTN	Purdue	W 79–68	12–10 (3–6)	Bryce Jordan Center (7,832); University Park, PA
Feb 6; 9:00 p.m., ESPN2	at No. 9 Michigan State	L 67–82	12–11 (3–7)	Breslin Center (14,797); East Lansing, MI
Feb 9; 4:15 p.m., BTN	Illinois	L 55–60	12–12 (3–8)	Bryce Jordan Center (7,573); University Park, PA
Feb 12; 7:00 p.m., BTN	at Indiana	W 66–65	13–12 (4–8)	Assembly Hall (17,472); Bloomington, IN
Feb 15; 7:00 p.m., ESPNU	No. 16 Iowa	L 70–82	13–13 (4–9)	Bryce Jordan Center (10,428); University Park, PA
Feb 20; 7:00 p.m., ESPNU	at Nebraska	L 67–80	13–14 (4–10)	Pinnacle Bank Arena (15,797); Lincoln, NE
Feb 27; 7:00 p.m., ESPN2	No. 22 Ohio State	W 65–63	14–14 (5–10)	Bryce Jordan Center (8,736); University Park, PA
Mar 2; 12:00 p.m., BTN	No. 14 Wisconsin	L 66–71	14–15 (5–11)	Bryce Jordan Center (7,807); University Park, PA
Mar 6; 7:00 p.m., ESPNU	at Northwestern	W 59–32	15–15 (6–11)	Welsh-Ryan Arena (6,253); Evanston, IL
Mar 9; 5:15 p.m., BTN	at Minnesota	L 63–81	15–16 (6–12)	Williams Arena (12,775); Minneapolis, MN
Big Ten tournament
Mar 13; 6:30 p.m., ESPN2	vs. Minnesota; First round	L 56–63	15–17	Bankers Life Fieldhouse (N/A); Indianapolis, IN
College Basketball Invitational
Mar 19*; 7:00 p.m.	Hampton; First round	W 69–65	16–17	Bryce Jordan Center (2,118); University Park, PA
Mar 24*; 7:00 p.m., CBSSN	at Siena; Quarterfinals	L 52–54	16–18	Times Union Center (3,598); Albany, NY
*Non-conference game. ^{#}Rankings from AP poll. (#) Tournament seedings in parentheses. All times are in Eastern Time.

Source -

== See also ==
- 2013–14 Penn State Lady Lions basketball team
