= 2013–14 Minnesota Golden Gophers men's basketball team =

American college basketball season

2013–14 Minnesota Golden Gophers men's basketball

NIT Champions

NIT Championship vs. SMU, W 65–63
- Conference: Big Ten Conference
- Record: 25–13 (8–10 Big Ten)
- Head coach: Richard Pitino
- Assistant coaches: Dan McHale; Kimani Young; Ben Johnson
- Home arena: Williams Arena

2013–14 Big Ten Conference men's basketball standings
	Conf.				Overall
Team	W		L	PCT	W		L	PCT
No. 7 Michigan	15	–	3	.833	28	–	9	.757
No. 12 Wisconsin	12	–	6	.667	30	–	8	.789
No. 11 Michigan State†	12	–	6	.667	29	–	9	.763
Nebraska	11	–	7	.611	19	–	13	.594
No. 22 Ohio State	10	–	8	.556	25	–	10	.714
Iowa	9	–	9	.500	20	–	13	.606
Minnesota	8	–	10	.444	25	–	13	.658
Illinois	7	–	11	.389	20	–	15	.571
Indiana	7	–	11	.389	17	–	15	.531
Penn State	6	–	12	.333	16	–	18	.471
Northwestern	6	–	12	.333	14	–	19	.424
Purdue	5	–	13	.278	15	–	17	.469
† 2014 Big Ten tournament winner Rankings from AP poll

The 2013–14 Minnesota Golden Gophers men's basketball team represented the University of Minnesota in the 2013-14 college basketball season. Led by first year head coach Richard Pitino for the Golden Gophers, members of the Big Ten Conference, played their home games at Williams Arena in Minneapolis, Minnesota. They finished the season 25–13, 8–10 in Big Ten play to finish in seventh place. They advanced to the quarterfinals of the Big Ten tournament where they lost to Wisconsin. They were invited to the National Invitation Tournament where they defeated High Point, Saint Mary's, Southern Miss, Florida State and SMU to be the 2014 NIT Champions.

== Departures ==
Name	Number	Pos.	Height	Weight	Year	Hometown	Notes
Julian Welch	00	G	6'3"	195	Senior	Elk Grove, CA	Graduated
Joe Coleman	11	G	6'4"	200	Sophomore	Minneapolis, MN	Transferred
Chris Halvorsen	22	F	6'8"	214	RS Junior	St. Paul, MN	Transferred
Andre Ingram	30	F	6'7"	210	Senior	Minneapolis, MN	Graduated
Trevor Mbakwe	32	F	6'8"	245	GS Senior	Saint Paul, MN	Graduated
Rodney Williams	33	F	6'7"	200	Senior	Minneapolis, MN	Graduated

== Incoming recruits ==
College recruiting information
Name	Hometown	School	Height	Weight	Commit date
Daquein McNeil; PG	Baltimore, MD	Vermont Academy	6 ft 3 in (1.91 m)	170 lb (77 kg)	Apr 17, 2013
Daquein McNeil; PG	Recruit ratings: Scout: Rivals: 247Sports: (69)				
Dre Mathieu; PG	Knoxville, TN	Central Arizona College	5 ft 9 in (1.75 m)	160 lb (73 kg)	May 7, 2013
Dre Mathieu; PG	Recruit ratings: Scout: Rivals: 247Sports: (JC)				
Overall recruit ranking: 247Sports: 86th
Note: In many cases, Scout, Rivals, 247Sports, On3, and ESPN may conflict in their listings of height and weight.; In these cases, the average was taken. ESPN grades are on a 100-point scale.; Sources: "2013 Minnesota Signees". ESPN.; "2013 Team Ranking". Rivals.

== Roster ==
2013–14 Minnesota Golden Gophers men's basketball team
Players
Coaches

Pos.	#	Name	Height	Weight	Year	Previous school	Hometown
G	1	Andre Hollins	6 ft 1 in (1.85 m)	200 lb (91 kg)	Jr	White Station HS	Memphis, TN
G	2	Kendal Shell	6 ft 0 in (1.83 m)	190 lb (86 kg)	Jr	Webster Groves HS	St. Louis, MO
G	3	Wally Ellenson	6 ft 4 in (1.93 m)	200 lb (91 kg)	So	Rice Lake HS	Rice Lake, WI
G	4	Deandre Mathieu	5 ft 9 in (1.75 m)	160 lb (73 kg)	Jr	Central Arizona College	Knoxville, TN
G	5	Daquein McNeil	6 ft 3 in (1.91 m)	170 lb (77 kg)	Fr	Vermont Acad.	Baltimore, MD
F	10	Oto Osenieks	6 ft 8 in (2.03 m)	205 lb (93 kg)	RS Jr	Brehm Prep	Riga, LAT
G	13	Maverick Ahanmisi	6 ft 2 in (1.88 m)	192 lb (87 kg)	Sr	Stoneridge Prep	Santa Clarita, CA
F	15	Maurice Walker	6 ft 10 in (2.08 m)	289 lb (131 kg)	RS Jr	Brewster Acad.	Scarborough, ON
G	20	Austin Hollins	6 ft 4 in (1.93 m)	185 lb (84 kg)	Sr	Germantown HS	Germantown, TN
G	21	Jasen Baranowski (W)	6 ft 2 in (1.88 m)	185 lb (84 kg)	Fr	Southwest HS	Green Bay, WI
F	23	Charles Buggs	6 ft 8 in (2.03 m)	198 lb (90 kg)	RS Fr	Hargrave Military Acad.	Arlington, TX
F	24	Joey King	6 ft 9 in (2.06 m)	219 lb (99 kg)	So	Drake	Eagan, MN
G	30	Malik Smith	6 ft 2 in (1.88 m)	200 lb (91 kg)	Sr	FIU	Boston, MA
C	55	Elliott Eliason	6 ft 11 in (2.11 m)	260 lb (118 kg)	RS Jr	Chadron HS	Chadron, NE

Head coach

- Richard Pitino (Providence)

Assistant coach(es)

- Ben Johnson (Minnesota)
- Dan McHale (Kentucky)
- Kimani Young (UTEP)

Legend

- (C) Team captain
- (S) Suspended
- (I) Ineligible
- (W) Walk-on
- Injured
- Current redshirt

Roster

== Schedule and results ==
Date time, TV	Rank^{#}	Opponent^{#}	Result	Record	Site (attendance) city, state
Exhibition
Nov 1*; 7:00 pm		Cardinal Stritch	W 79–57	–	Williams Arena (N/A); Minneapolis, MN
Nov 4*; 7:00 pm		Concordia	W 101–67	–	Williams Arena (N/A); Minneapolis, MN
Regular season
Nov 8*; 7:00 pm, ESPN3		Lehigh	W 81–62	1–0	Williams Arena (12,957); Minneapolis, MN
Nov 12*; 7:00 pm		Montana	W 84–58	2–0	Williams Arena (10,459); Minneapolis, MN
Nov 16*; 6:00 pm		at Richmond	W 74–59	3–0	Robins Center (6,422); Richmond, VA
Nov 19*; 7:00 pm		Coastal Carolina; Maui Invitational Opening Round	W 82–72	4–0	Williams Arena (10,137); Minneapolis, MN
Nov 22*; 6:00 pm, BTN		Wofford	W 79–57	5–0	Williams Arena (10,342); Minneapolis, MN
Nov 25*; 4:30 pm, ESPN2		vs. No. 8 Syracuse; Maui Invitational First Round	L 67–75	5–1	Lahaina Civic Center (2,400); Maui, HI
Nov 26*; 1:00 pm, ESPN2		vs. Arkansas; Maui Invitational Consolation 2nd Round	L 73–87	5–2	Lahaina Civic Center (2,400); Maui, HI
Nov 27*; 1:30 pm, ESPNU		at Chaminade; Maui Invitational 7th place game	W 83–68	6–2	Lahaina Civic Center (2,400); Maui, HI
Dec 3*; 8:30 pm, ESPNU		Florida State; ACC–Big Ten Challenge	W 71–61	7–2	Williams Arena (11,386); Minneapolis, MN
Dec 7*; 2:00 pm, ESPN3		New Orleans	W 80–65	8–2	Williams Arena (11,228); Minneapolis, MN
Dec 10*; 7:00 pm, BTN		South Dakota State	W 75–59	9–2	Williams Arena (11,349); Minneapolis, MN
Dec 20*; 8:00 pm, BTN		Nebraska–Omaha	W 92–79	10–2	Williams Arena (11,890); Minneapolis, MN
Dec 28*; 7:30 pm, BTN		Texas A&M–Corpus Christi	W 65–44	11–2	Williams Arena (11,855); Minneapolis, MN
Big Ten regular season
Jan 2; 6:00 pm, BTN		Michigan	L 60–63	11–3 (0–1)	Williams Arena (12,225); Minneapolis, MN
Jan 5; 1:30 pm, BTN		Purdue	W 82–79	12–3 (1–1)	Williams Arena (11,851); Minneapolis, MN
Jan 8; 6:00 pm, BTN		at Penn State	W 68–65	13–3 (2–1)	Bryce Jordan Center (5,010); University Park, PA
Jan 11; 1:15 pm, BTN		at No. 5 Michigan State	L 75–87 ^{OT}	13–4 (2–2)	Breslin Center (14,797); East Lansing, MI
Jan 16; 8:00 pm, ESPN2		No. 11 Ohio State	W 63–53	14–4 (3–2)	Williams Arena (14,625); Minneapolis, MN
Jan 19; 12:00 pm, BTN		at No. 14 Iowa	L 73–94	14–5 (3–3)	Carver–Hawkeye Arena (15,400); Iowa City, IA
Jan 22; 8:00 pm, BTN		No. 9 Wisconsin	W 81–68	15–5 (4–3)	Williams Arena (14,625); Minneapolis, MN
Jan 26; 5:00 pm, BTN		at Nebraska	L 78–82	15–6 (4–4)	Pinnacle Bank Arena (15,945); Lincoln, NE
Feb 1; 1:00 pm, BTN		Northwestern	L 54–55	15–7 (4–5)	Williams Arena (12,744); Minneapolis, MN
Feb 5; 7:30 pm, BTN		at Purdue	L 74–77 ^{3OT}	15–8 (4–6)	Mackey Arena (12,818); West Lafayette, IN
Feb 8; 7:15 pm, BTN		Indiana	W 66–60	16–8 (5–6)	Williams Arena (14,625); Minneapolis, MN
Feb 13; 8:00 pm, ESPN		at No. 21 Wisconsin	L 70–78	16–9 (5–7)	Kohl Center (17,249); Madison, WI
Feb 16; 5:00 pm, BTN		at Northwestern	W 54–48	17–9 (6–7)	Welsh-Ryan Arena (6,719); Evanston, IL
Feb 19; 8:00 pm, BTN		Illinois	L 49–62	17–10 (6–8)	Williams Arena (12,221); Minneapolis, MN
Feb 22; 5:00 pm, BTN		at No. 24 Ohio State	L 46–64	17–11 (6–9)	Value City Arena (18,809); Columbus, OH
Feb 25; 6:00 pm, BTN		No. 20 Iowa	W 95–89	18–11 (7–9)	Williams Arena (14,625); Minneapolis, MN
Mar 1; 5:00 pm, BTN		at No. 16 Michigan	L 56–66	18–12 (7–10)	Crisler Arena (12,707); Ann Arbor, MI
Mar 9; 4:15 pm, BTN		Penn State	W 81–63	19–12 (8–10)	Williams Arena (12,775); Minneapolis, MN
Big Ten tournament
Mar 13; 5:30 pm, ESPN2	(7)	vs. (10) Penn State; First round	W 63–56	20–12	Bankers Life Fieldhouse (N/A); Indianapolis, IN
Mar 14; 5:30 pm, BTN	(7)	vs. (2) No. 12 Wisconsin; Quarterfinals	L 57–83	20–13	Bankers Life Fieldhouse (N/A); Indianapolis, IN
National Invitation Tournament
Mar 18*; 7:15 pm, ESPN3	(1)	(8) High Point; First round	W 88–81	21–13	Williams Arena (3,493); Minneapolis, MN
Mar 23*; 2:00 pm, ESPN2	(1)	(4) Saint Mary's; Second round	W 63–55	22–13	Williams Arena (5,489); Minneapolis, MN
Mar 25*; 8:00 pm, ESPN	(1)	(3) Southern Miss; Quarterfinals	W 81–73	23–13	Williams Arena (5,444); Minneapolis, MN
Apr 1*; 8:00 pm, ESPN2	(1)	vs. (1) Florida State; Semifinals	W 67–64 ^{OT}	24–13	Madison Square Garden (7,193); New York City, NY
Apr 3*; 6:00 pm, ESPN	(1)	vs. (1) SMU; Championship	W 65–63	25–13	Madison Square Garden (5,268); New York City, NY
*Non-conference game. ^{#}Rankings from AP Poll, (#) during NIT is seed within region. (#) Tournament seedings in parentheses. All times are in Central Time.
