= 2013–14 Northwestern Wildcats men's basketball team =

American college basketball season

2013–14 Northwestern Wildcats men's basketball
- Conference: Big Ten Conference
- Record: 14–19 (6–12 Big Ten)
- Head coach: Chris Collins
- Assistant coaches: Brian James; Patrick Baldwin; Armon Gates
- Home arena: Welsh-Ryan Arena

2013–14 Big Ten Conference men's basketball standings
	Conf.				Overall
Team	W		L	PCT	W		L	PCT
No. 7 Michigan	15	–	3	.833	28	–	9	.757
No. 12 Wisconsin	12	–	6	.667	30	–	8	.789
No. 11 Michigan State†	12	–	6	.667	29	–	9	.763
Nebraska	11	–	7	.611	19	–	13	.594
No. 22 Ohio State	10	–	8	.556	25	–	10	.714
Iowa	9	–	9	.500	20	–	13	.606
Minnesota	8	–	10	.444	25	–	13	.658
Illinois	7	–	11	.389	20	–	15	.571
Indiana	7	–	11	.389	17	–	15	.531
Penn State	6	–	12	.333	16	–	18	.471
Northwestern	6	–	12	.333	14	–	19	.424
Purdue	5	–	13	.278	15	–	17	.469
† 2014 Big Ten tournament winner Rankings from AP poll

The 2013–14 Northwestern Wildcats men's basketball team represented Northwestern University in the 2013–14 college basketball season. Led by first year head coach Chris Collins. The Wildcats were members of the Big Ten Conference and played their home games at Welsh-Ryan Arena. They finished the season 14–19, 6–12 in Big Ten play to finish in a tie for tenth place. They advanced to the quarterfinals of the Big Ten tournament where they lost to Michigan State.

== Departures ==
Name	Number	Pos.	Height	Weight	Year	Hometown	Notes
Omar Jimenez	0	G	6'1"	185	Freshman	Kennesaw, GA	Injured
Alex Marcotullio	4	G	6'3"	195	Senior	Warren, MI	Graduated
Reggie Hearn	11	G	6'4"	210	Senior	Fort Wayne, IN	Graduated
Jared Swopshire	12	F	6'8"	210	GS Senior	St. Louis, MO	Graduated

== Incoming recruits ==
College recruiting information
Name	Hometown	School	Height	Weight	Commit date
Nate Taphorn; SF	Pekin, IL	Pekin Community	6 ft 7 in (2.01 m)	180 lb (82 kg)	Jul 15, 2012
Nate Taphorn; SF	Recruit ratings: Scout: Rivals: (75)				
Overall recruit ranking:
Note: In many cases, Scout, Rivals, 247Sports, On3, and ESPN may conflict in their listings of height and weight.; In these cases, the average was taken. ESPN grades are on a 100-point scale.; Sources: "2013 Team Ranking". Rivals.

== Roster ==
2013–14 Northwestern Wildcats men's basketball team
Players
Coaches
}

Pos.	#	Name	Height	Weight	Year	Previous school	Hometown
G/F	1	Drew Crawford	6 ft 5 in (1.96 m)	215 lb (98 kg)	RS Sr	Naperville Central	Naperville, IL
G	3	Dave Sobolewski	6 ft 1 in (1.85 m)	180 lb (82 kg)	Jr	Benet Academy	Naperville, IL
F	10	Mike Turner	6 ft 8 in (2.03 m)	222 lb (101 kg)	RS So	Univ. of Chicago Lab.	Chicago, IL
G	13	Kale Abrahamson	6 ft 7 in (2.01 m)	210 lb (95 kg)	So	Valley HS	West Des Moines, IA
G	14	Tre Demps	6 ft 2 in (1.88 m)	193 lb (88 kg)	RS So	Ronald Reagan HS	San Antonio, TX
G	15	James Montgomery III	6 ft 4 in (1.93 m)	202 lb (92 kg)	Sr	Santa Monica	Los Angeles, CA
C	22	Alex Olah	7 ft 0 in (2.13 m)	265 lb (120 kg)	So	Traders Point Christian Acad.	Timișoara, ROU
G	23	JerShon Cobb	6 ft 5 in (1.96 m)	205 lb (93 kg)	RS Jr	Columbia HS	Decatur, GA
F/C	31	Aaron Liberman	6 ft 10 in (2.08 m)	215 lb (98 kg)	RS Fr	Valley Torah HS	Los Angeles, CA
F	32	Nate Taphorn	6 ft 7 in (2.01 m)	190 lb (86 kg)	Fr	Pekin Community HS	Pekin, IL
G/F	34	Sanjay Lumpkin	6 ft 6 in (1.98 m)	210 lb (95 kg)	So	Benilde-St. Margaret's	Wayzata, MN
C	42	Chier Ajou	7 ft 2 in (2.18 m)	245 lb (111 kg)	So	St. Thomas More	Aweil, SSD
F	45	Nikola Cerina	6 ft 9 in (2.06 m)	235 lb (107 kg)	RS Sr	TCU	Topola, SRB

Head coach

- Chris Collins (Duke)

Assistant coach(es)

- Brian James (Illinois State)
- Patrick Baldwin (Northwestern)
- Armon Gates (Kent State)

Legend

- (C) Team captain
- (S) Suspended
- (I) Ineligible
- (W) Walk-on
- Injured
- Current redshirt

Roster
Last update: 2013-07-09

== Schedule and results ==
Date time, TV	Opponent	Result	Record	Site (attendance) city, state
Exhibition
Nov 6*; 7:15 pm	Lewis	W 57–46		Welsh-Ryan Arena (N/A); Evanston, IL
Non-conference regular season
Nov 9*; 7:30 pm, BTN	Eastern Illinois	W 72–55	1–0	Welsh-Ryan Arena (5,182); Evanston, IL
Nov 14*; 10:00 pm, ESPNU	at Stanford	L 58–71	1–1	Maples Pavilion (4,692); Stanford, CA
Nov 17*; 7:30 pm	Illinois State	L 64–68	1–2	Welsh-Ryan Arena (6,025); Evanston, IL
Nov 20*; 7:00 pm, CSNC	at UIC	W 93–58	2–2	UIC Pavilion (5,630); Chicago, IL
Nov 22*; 7:00 pm	IUPUI; Las Vegas Invitational	W 63–61	3–2	Welsh-Ryan Arena (5,915); Evanston, IL
Nov 25*; 7:00 pm	Gardner-Webb; Las Vegas Invitational	W 72–59	4–2	Welsh-Ryan Arena (5,443); Evanston, IL
Nov 28*; 9:30 pm, ESPNU	vs. Missouri; Las Vegas Invitational semifinals	L 67–78	4–3	Orleans Arena (N/A); Paradise, NV
Nov 29*; 10:30 pm, ESPN2	vs. No. 19 UCLA; Las Vegas Invitational	L 79–95	4–4	Orleans Arena (2,520); Paradise, NV
Dec 4*; 6:30 pm, ESPNU	at NC State; ACC-Big Ten Challenge	L 48–69	4–5	PNC Arena (11,459); Raleigh, NC
Dec 7*; 4:00 pm	Western Michigan	W 51–35	5–5	Welsh-Ryan Arena (6,167); Evanston, IL
Dec 16*; 6:00 pm, BTN	Mississippi Valley State	W 86–64	6–5	Welsh-Ryan Arena (5,344); Evanston, IL
Dec 22*; 1:00 pm	Brown	W 58–52	7–5	Welsh-Ryan Arena (6,591); Evanston, IL
Dec 27*; 8:00 pm, BTN	DePaul	L 56–57	7–6	Welsh-Ryan Arena (6,819); Evanston, IL
Big Ten regular season
Jan 2; 6:00 pm, ESPN2	No. 4 Wisconsin	L 49–76	7–7 (0–1)	Welsh-Ryan Arena (8,117); Evanston, IL
Jan 5; 11:00 am, BTN	at Michigan	L 51–74	7–8 (0–2)	Crisler Arena (12,707); Ann Arbor, MI
Jan 9; 8:00 pm, ESPNU	at No. 20 Iowa	L 67–93	7–9 (0–3)	Carver–Hawkeye Arena (14,016); Iowa City, IA
Jan 12; 6:30 pm, BTN	No. 23 Illinois	W 49–43	8–9 (1–3)	Welsh-Ryan Arena (8,117); Evanston, IL
Jan 15; 6:00 pm, BTN	No. 4 Michigan State	L 40–54	8–10 (1–4)	Welsh-Ryan Arena (8,117); Evanston, IL
Jan 18; 1:30 pm, BTN	at Indiana	W 54–47	9–10 (2–4)	Assembly Hall (17,472); Bloomington, IN
Jan 21; 8:00 pm, BTN	Purdue	W 63–60 ^{2OT}	10–10 (3–4)	Welsh-Ryan Arena (6,063); Evanston, IL
Jan 25; 11:00 am, BTN	No. 10 Iowa	L 50–76	10–11 (3–5)	Welsh-Ryan Arena (8,117); Evanston, IL
Jan 29; 8:00 pm, BTN	at No. 14 Wisconsin	W 65–56	11–11 (4–5)	Kohl Center (17,155); Madison, WI
Feb 1; 1:00 pm, BTN	at Minnesota	W 55–54	12–11 (5–5)	Williams Arena (12,744); Minneapolis, MN
Feb 8; 12:00 pm, ESPNU	Nebraska	L 49–53	12–12 (5–6)	Welsh-Ryan Arena (7,109); Evanston, IL
Feb 13; 6:00 pm, BTN	at Michigan State	L 70–85	12–13 (5–7)	Breslin Center (14,797); East Lansing, MI
Feb 16; 5:00 pm, BTN	Minnesota	L 48–54	12–14 (5–8)	Welsh-Ryan Arena (6,719); Evanston, IL
Feb 19; 6:00 pm, BTN	at No. 24 Ohio State	L 60–76	12–15 (5–9)	Value City Arena (15,878); Columbus, OH
Feb 23; 7:15 pm, BTN	Indiana	L 56–61	12–16 (5–10)	Welsh-Ryan Arena (8,117); Evanston, IL
Mar 1; 4:00 pm, ESPNU	at Nebraska	L 47–54	12–17 (5–11)	Pinnacle Bank Arena (15,978); Lincoln, NE
Mar 6; 6:00 pm, ESPNU	Penn State	L 32–59	12–18 (5–12)	Welsh-Ryan Arena (6,253); Evanston, IL
Mar 9; 11:00 am, BTN	at Purdue	W 74–65	13–18 (6–12)	Mackey Arena (13,332); West Lafayette, IN
Big Ten tournament
Mar 13; 8:00 pm, ESPN2	vs. Iowa; First round	W 67–62	14–18	Bankers Life Fieldhouse (N/A); Indianapolis, IN
Mar 14; 8:00 pm, BTN	vs. No. 22 Michigan State; Quarterfinals	L 51–67	14–19	Bankers Life Fieldhouse (N/A); Indianapolis, IN
*Non-conference game. ^{#}Rankings from AP Poll. (#) Tournament seedings in parentheses.
