= Terran Petteway =

American basketball player (born 1992)

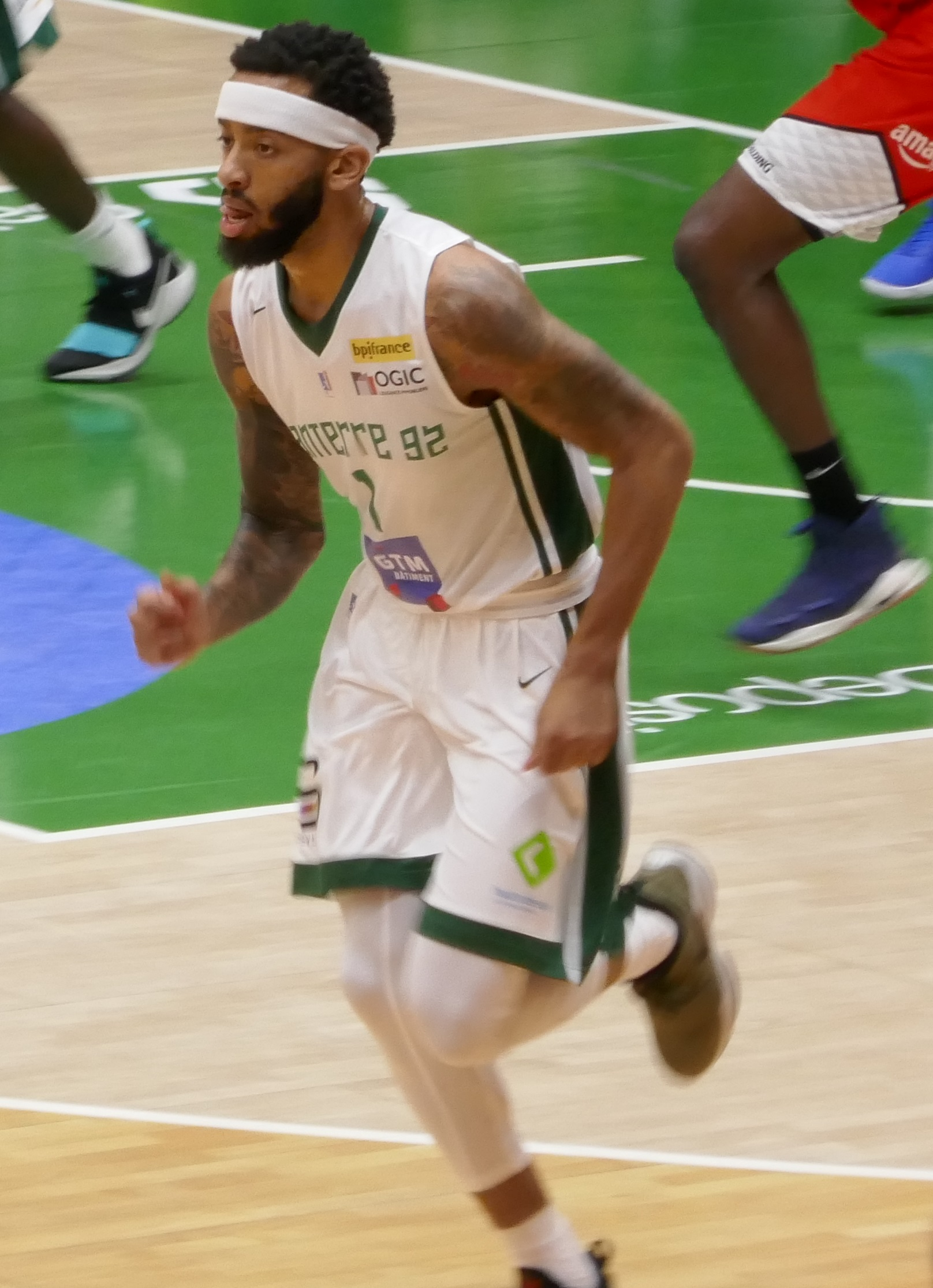
- Terran Petteway in 2017

No. 2 – Darkhan United
- Position: Small forward / shooting guard

Personal information
- Born: October 8, 1992 (age 34) Galveston, Texas, U.S.
- Listed height: 6 ft 6 in (1.98 m)
- Listed weight: 209 lb (95 kg)

Career information
- High school: Ball (Galveston, Texas)
- College: Texas Tech (2011–2012); Nebraska (2013–2015)
- NBA draft: 2015: undrafted
- Playing career: 2015–present

Career history
- 2015–2016: Fort Wayne Mad Ants
- 2016–2017: Pistoia Basket 2000
- 2017–2018: Nanterre 92
- 2018: PAOK Thessaloniki
- 2018–2019: Dinamo Sassari
- 2019–2020: Pistoia Basket 2000
- 2020–2022: Peristeri
- 2022–2023: Hapoel Eilat
- 2024–present: Darkhan United

Career highlights
- Match des Champions winner (2017); Match des Champions MVP (2017); First-team All-Big Ten (2014); Third-team All-Big Ten (2015)
- Stats at Basketball Reference

Terran Petteway (born October 8, 1992) is an American professional basketball player for Darkhan United of The League. He played college basketball for the Texas Tech Red Raiders and Nebraska Cornhuskers. Petteway led the Big Ten Conference in scoring during the 2013–14 season.

== High school career ==
As a high school senior at Ball High School, Petteway was signed by Pat Knight, however Knight was fired on March 7, 2011, from his role as head coach of the Texas Tech Red Raiders basketball team before Petteway even suited up for the Red Raiders. Petteway elected to maintain his commitment to Texas Tech after Billy Gillispie was hired as the Red Raiders new head coach on March 20, 2011.

College recruiting
Name	Hometown	School	Height	Weight	Commit date
Terran Petteway; SF	Galveston, TX	Ball High School	6 ft 5 in (1.96 m)	200 lb (91 kg)	Nov 15, 2010
Terran Petteway; SF	Recruit ratings: Scout: Rivals: 247Sports: ESPN:				
Overall recruit ranking:
Note: In many cases, Scout, Rivals, 247Sports, On3, and ESPN may conflict in their listings of height and weight.; In these cases, the average was taken. ESPN grades are on a 100-point scale.; Sources: "2011 Texas Tech Basketball Commitment List". Rivals.; "Men's Basketball Recruiting". Scout.; "ESPN - Texas Tech Red Raiders Basketball Recruiting 2011". ESPN.; "Scout.com Team Recruiting Rankings". Scout.; "2011 Team Ranking". Rivals.

== College career ==
=== Freshman year ===
As a true freshman at Texas Tech, Petteway saw action in 28 games and 10 of his 11 starts during the season came during Big 12 Conference play. Texas Tech finished their 2011–12 season with just eight total wins and a single conference win, which was the deciding factor in Petteway electing to transfer to a different institution.

=== Transfer to Nebraska ===
Petteway opted to sign with Tim Miles and the Nebraska Cornhuskers men's basketball program citing the previous relationship he had developed with Coach Miles during high school when Miles recruited him at Colorado State.

=== Sophomore year ===
After sitting out during the 2012–13 season, Petteway was named co-captain for the Cornhuskers. Petteway led the league in scoring, averaging 18.1 points per game, becoming the first Nebraska basketball player to lead the league in scoring since Andre Smith led the Big Eight Conference during the 1980–81 season. He also helped guide the Nebraska Cornhuskers men's basketball team to its first NCAA Men's Division I Basketball tournament appearance since 1998.

=== Junior year ===
Prior to the 2014–15 NCAA Division I men's basketball season, Petteway was named Preseason All-American first team selection by Bleacher Report. He was a second team selection by CBSSports.com and a third team selection by SB Nation, and USA Today. He was also listed as a John R. Wooden Award Preseason Top 50 candidate.

In April 2015, Petteway declared for the NBA draft, forgoing his final year of college eligibility.

=== College statistics ===
Year	Team	GP	GS	MPG	FG%	3P%	FT%	RPG	APG	SPG	BPG	PPG
2011–12	Texas Tech	28	11	13.1	.368	.300	.462	2.0	.7	.2	.2	3.1
2013–14	Nebraska	32	32	31.7	.426	.327	.819	4.8	1.6	.9	.8	18.1
2014–15	Nebraska	31	31	35.0	.396	.313	.711	4.9	2.8	1.1	.9	18.2

== Professional career ==
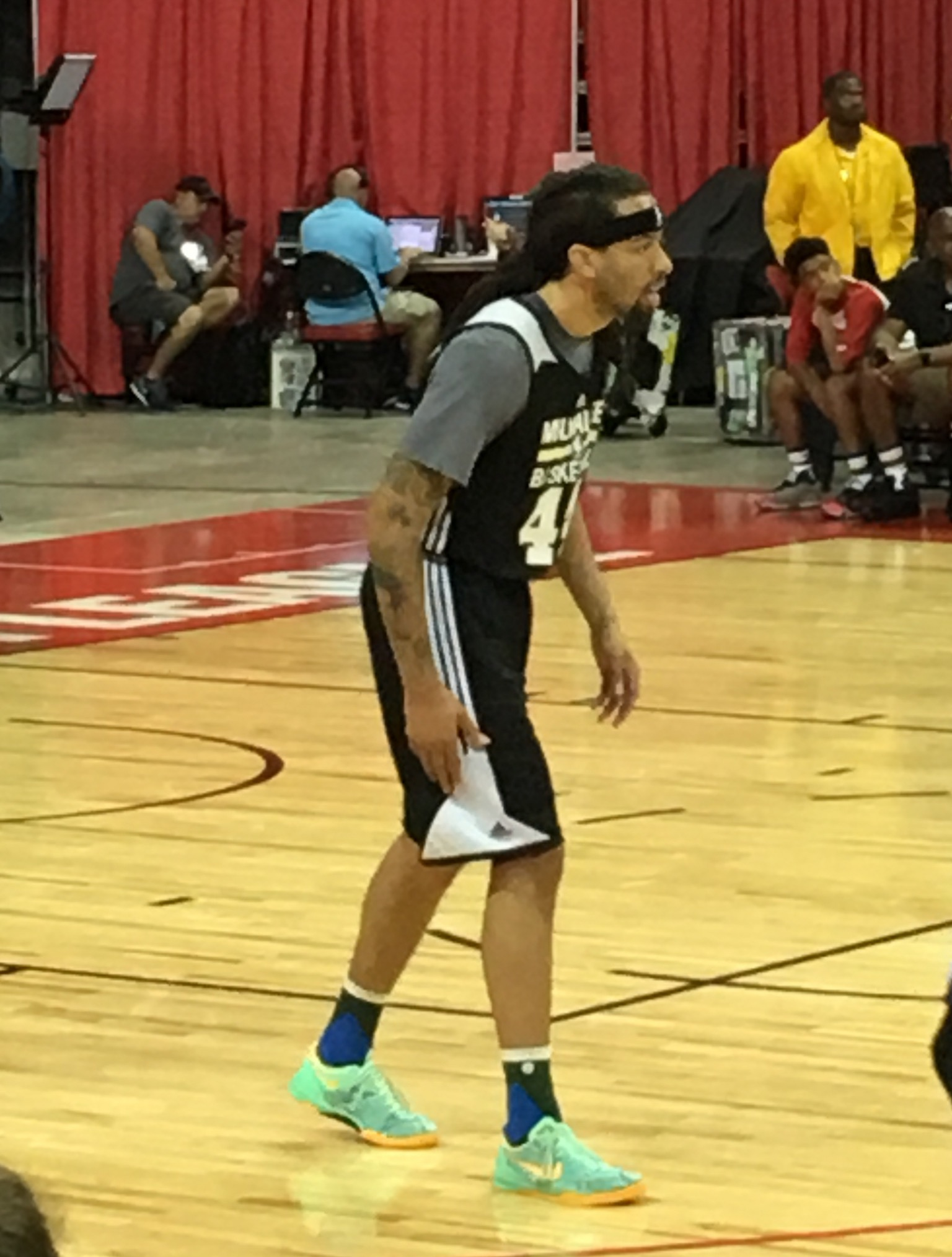
Petteway in 2016 NBA summer league

After going undrafted in the 2015 NBA draft, Petteway joined the Atlanta Hawks for the 2015 NBA Summer League. On July 24, 2015, he signed with the Hawks. However, he was later waived by the Hawks on October 22 after appearing in three preseason games. On October 25, he signed with the Indiana Pacers, only to be waived by the team the following day. On October 29, he was acquired by the Fort Wayne Mad Ants of the NBA Development League as an affiliate player of the Pacers. On July 5, 2016, Petteway joined the Milwaukee Bucks for the 2016 NBA Summer League.

On August 7, 2016, he signed with Pistoia of the Italian Lega Basket Serie A, beginning his European career. Petteway spent the 2017–18 season with the French club Nanterre 92 and also had a brief stint in Greece with PAOK Thessaloniki, before returning to Italy for Dinamo Sassari in 2018.

On July 28, 2019, Petteway re-joined Pistoia for a second stint. There, he averaged 16.3 points, 4.3 rebounds and 3.1 assists per game.

On June 20, 2020, Petteway signed with Peristeri of the Greek Basket League. In 24 games during the 2020–21 campaign, he averaged 11.5 points, 2.7 rebounds, and 2.1 assists per contest. On July 26, 2021, he renewed his contract with the Greek club. In 26 games during the 2021–22 campaign, he averaged 11.6 points, 2.8 rebounds, 1.5 assists and 0.8 steals, playing around 26 minutes per contest.

On September 11, 2022, he signed with Hapoel Eilat of the Israeli Basketball Premier League.

== Personal life ==
Petteway has two older brothers, Terrell and Tavoir, both whom played college basketball. His oldest brother, Terrell played college basketball for Lamar University and also played professionally in England for the Sheffield Sharks. His mother, Joetta, died on April 7, 2015, after a two and half year battle with follicular dendritic cell sarcoma at age 53, the same age her mother also died of cancer.
