= LaQuinton Ross =

American basketball player

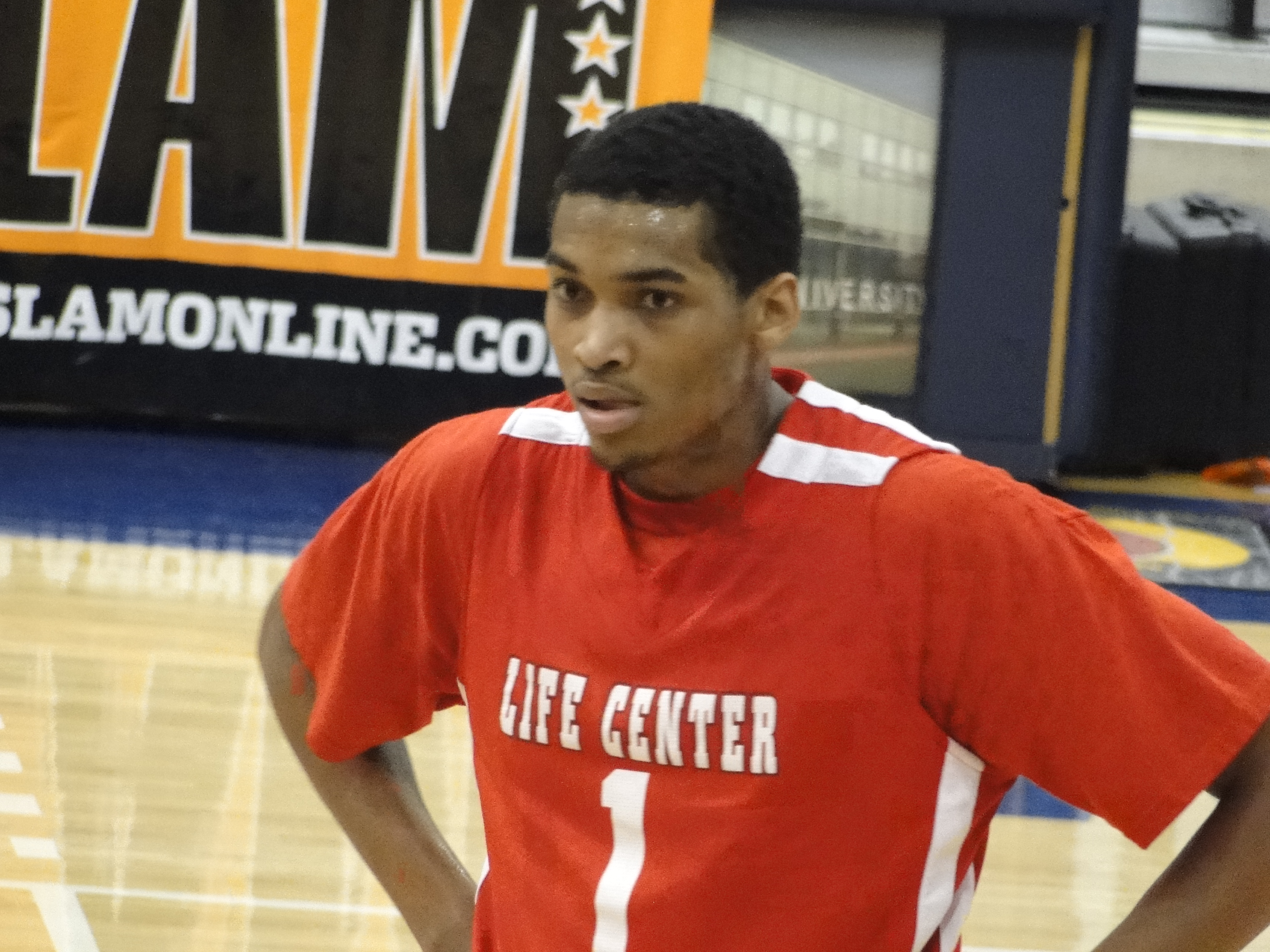
- Ross in 2010

Free agent
- Position: Small forward / shooting guard

Personal information
- Born: November 18, 1991 (age 34) Jackson, Mississippi
- Listed height: 6 ft 8 in (2.03 m)
- Listed weight: 220 lb (100 kg)

Career information
- High school: Murrah (Jackson, Mississippi); Life Center Academy (Burlington, New Jersey)
- College: Ohio State (2011–2014)
- NBA draft: 2014: undrafted
- Playing career: 2014–present

Career history
- 2014–2015: VL Pesaro
- 2015–2016: Pallacanestro Cantù
- 2016: Hapoel Eilat
- 2017: Club Malvín
- 2017: Fujian Lightning
- 2017: Texas Legends
- 2018: Quimsa
- 2018: Al Hilal
- 2018: Northern Arizona Suns
- 2019: Memphis Hustle
- 2021–2022: Zlatibor
- 2022–2023: Pallacanestro Mantovana
- 2023: CS Antonine
- 2024: Pioneros Del Avila
- 2025: Club Trouville
- 2025–2026: Rockingham Flames

Career highlights
- NBL1 West champion (2026); ABA League 2 champion (2022); Third-team All-Big Ten (2014)

LaQuinton Ross (born November 18, 1991) is an American professional basketball player who last played for the Rockingham Flames of the NBL1 West. He played college basketball for the Ohio State Buckeyes.

== High school career ==
Ross attended Murrah High School in Jackson, Mississippi for two years then transferred to Life Center Academy in Burlington, New Jersey where he averaged a total of 25.3 points and 11.3 rebounds per game as a senior.

== College career ==
Ross' commitment to the Ohio State University was delayed due an investigation by the NCAA regarding his academic eligibility, joining the team on December 11, 2011. Later on December 22, Ross made his first appearance of his inaugural year by adding 5 points vs Miami University. After the freshman season, Ross played in all 37 games of the 2012–13 season. Included in Ross' 2012–13 campaign was a 22-point game versus Northern Kentucky University on December 1, a 15-point breakout versus Chicago State, and another 16-point performance versus Michigan on February 5. Overall, during Ross' 2012–13 season, he acquired a total of 8.3 points per game and a field goal percentage of 46.8%, an improvement from his 2.0 points per game and 33.3% field goal percentage during his freshmen year. During the 2013 NCAA Tournament, Ross scored the game-winning 3-point shoot off a pass from Ohio State teammate Aaron Craft which subsequently led to Ohio State's advancement to the Elite Eight. In the next tournament game, Ross scored 19 points in 22 minutes during a 70–66 loss to the Wichita State Shockers. Later, during his 2013–14 season, Ross totaled 15.2 points, 5.9 rebounds, and a 44.7 field goal percentage.

In March 2014, Ross declared for the NBA draft, forgoing his final year of college eligibility.

== Professional career ==
After going undrafted in the 2014 NBA draft, Ross joined the Los Angeles Lakers for the 2014 NBA Summer League. On August 9, 2014, he signed with VL Pesaro of the Italian Serie A for the 2014–15 season.

Ross played for the Charlotte Hornets in the 2015 Orlando Summer League and the Washington Wizards in the 2015 Las Vegas Summer League. On July 27, 2015, he signed with Pallacanestro Cantù, again of the Serie A, for the 2015–16 season. On January 5, 2016, he left Cantù and signed with Hapoel Eilat of the Israeli Premier League. In November 2016, he parted ways with Eilat. On January 4, 2017, he signed with French club JDA Dijon Basket for the rest of 2016–17 Pro A season. He parted ways with Dijon on January 25 before appearing in a game for them. Six days later, he signed with Club Malvín of the Liga Uruguaya de Basketball. He then played for the Fujian Lightning during the 2017 Chinese NBL season.

Ross started the 2017–18 season playing two games for the Texas Legends of the NBA G League. On February 1, 2018, he signed in Argentina with Quimsa of the Liga Nacional de Básquet. He later played five games for Al Hilal of the Saudi Basketball League.

Ross joined the Northern Arizona Suns for the 2018–19 NBA G League season. He was waived by the Suns on December 17 and later joined the Memphis Hustle on February 11, 2019.

On August 16, 2021, Ross signed with Zlatibor of the Basketball League of Serbia. In April 2022, Zlatibor won the ABA League Second Division for the 2021–22 season following a 78–73 overtime win over MZT Skopje Aerodrom.

On August 4, 2022, Ross signed with Pallacanestro Mantovana of the Italian Serie A2.

Ross joined CS Antonine of the Lebanese Basketball League for the 2023–24 season, playing seven games between October 26 and December 8. He later played for Pioneros Del Avila during the 2024 SPB season.

In January 2025, Ross joined Club Trouville of the Liga Uruguaya de Básquetbol, playing seven games. In April 2025, he joined the Rockingham Flames of the NBL1 West for the 2025 season.

In May 2026, Ross re-joined the Rockingham Flames for the rest of the 2026 NBL1 West season. He helped the Flames win the NBL1 West championship with 14 points and nine rebounds in a 66–62 grand final victory over the Geraldton Buccaneers.
