= 2014–15 Indiana Hoosiers men's basketball team =

American college basketball season

2014–15 Indiana Hoosiers men's basketball

NCAA tournament, round of 64
- Conference: Big Ten Conference
- Record: 20–14 (9–9 Big Ten)
- Head coach: Tom Crean (7th season)
- Assistant coaches: Tim Buckley (7th season); Steve McClain (5th season); Chuck Martin (1st season)
- Home arena: Assembly Hall

2014–15 Big Ten Conference men's basketball standings
	Conf.				Overall
Team	W		L	PCT	W		L	PCT
No. 3 Wisconsin †	16	–	2	.889	36	–	4	.900
No. 12 Maryland	14	–	4	.778	28	–	7	.800
No. 23 Michigan State	12	–	6	.667	27	–	12	.692
Iowa	12	–	6	.667	22	–	12	.647
Purdue	12	–	6	.667	21	–	13	.618
Ohio State	11	–	7	.611	24	–	11	.686
Indiana	9	–	9	.500	20	–	14	.588
Illinois	9	–	9	.500	19	–	14	.576
Michigan	8	–	10	.444	16	–	16	.500
Minnesota	6	–	12	.333	18	–	15	.545
Northwestern	6	–	12	.333	15	–	17	.469
Nebraska	5	–	13	.278	13	–	18	.419
Penn State	4	–	14	.222	18	–	16	.529
Rutgers	2	–	16	.111	10	–	22	.313
† 2015 Big Ten tournament winner Rankings from AP poll

The 2014–15 Indiana Hoosiers men's basketball team represented Indiana University in the 2014–15 NCAA Division I men's basketball season. Their head coach was Tom Crean, in his seventh season with the Hoosiers. The team played its home games at Assembly Hall in Bloomington, Indiana, and was a member of the Big Ten Conference. This season marked the 115th season of basketball at Indiana University.

The Hoosiers went 20–14 overall and 9–9 in the Big Ten Conference to finish in a tie for seventh place. Much of the Hoosiers' difficulties were caused by a lack of defense and post presence. The Hoosiers improved over last season, where they did not appear in any postseason tournament, by being selected to play in the NCAA tournament as a #10 seed in the Midwest region. They made an early exit, as #7 Wichita State knocked them off in the second round.

== Previous season ==
The Hoosiers finished the season with an overall record of 17–15, with a record of 7–11 in the Big Ten regular season, tying for eighth place. After not being selected to play in the NIT, Indiana chose not to accept an invitation to the CBI, claiming, "We're Indiana. We don't play in the CBI".

== Preseason ==
The Hoosiers began the preseason with a five-game trip to Canada in August. They finished 4–1, shooting 42% from three-point range. James Blackmon, Jr. and Troy Williams were the leading scorers, with 18.8 and 18.4 ppg.

=== Departures ===
Indiana departures
Name	Number	Pos.	Height	Weight	Year	Hometown	Reason for departure
Noah Vonleh	1	F	6'10"	240	Freshman	Haverhill, Massachusetts	2014 NBA draft
Will Sheehey	0	F	6'7"	200	Senior	Stuart, Florida	Graduated
Evan Gordon	10	SG	6'0"	192	Grad	Indianapolis, Indiana	Graduated
Luke Fischer	40	C	6'11"	230	Freshman	Germantown, Wisconsin	Transfer (Marquette)
Austin Etherington	13	SF	6'6"	213	RS sophomore	Cicero, Indiana	Graduate transfer (Butler)
Jeremy Hollowell	33	F	6'8"	219	Sophomore	Indianapolis, Indiana	Transfer (Georgia State)
Peter Jurkin	42	C	7'0"	230	Sophomore	Juba, South Sudan	Transfer (East Tennessee State)

=== Recruiting class ===
In addition to the six incoming freshmen recruits, Indiana also added Nick Zeisloft, a graduate transfer from Illinois State. He was eligible to play immediately, and had two years of eligibility.

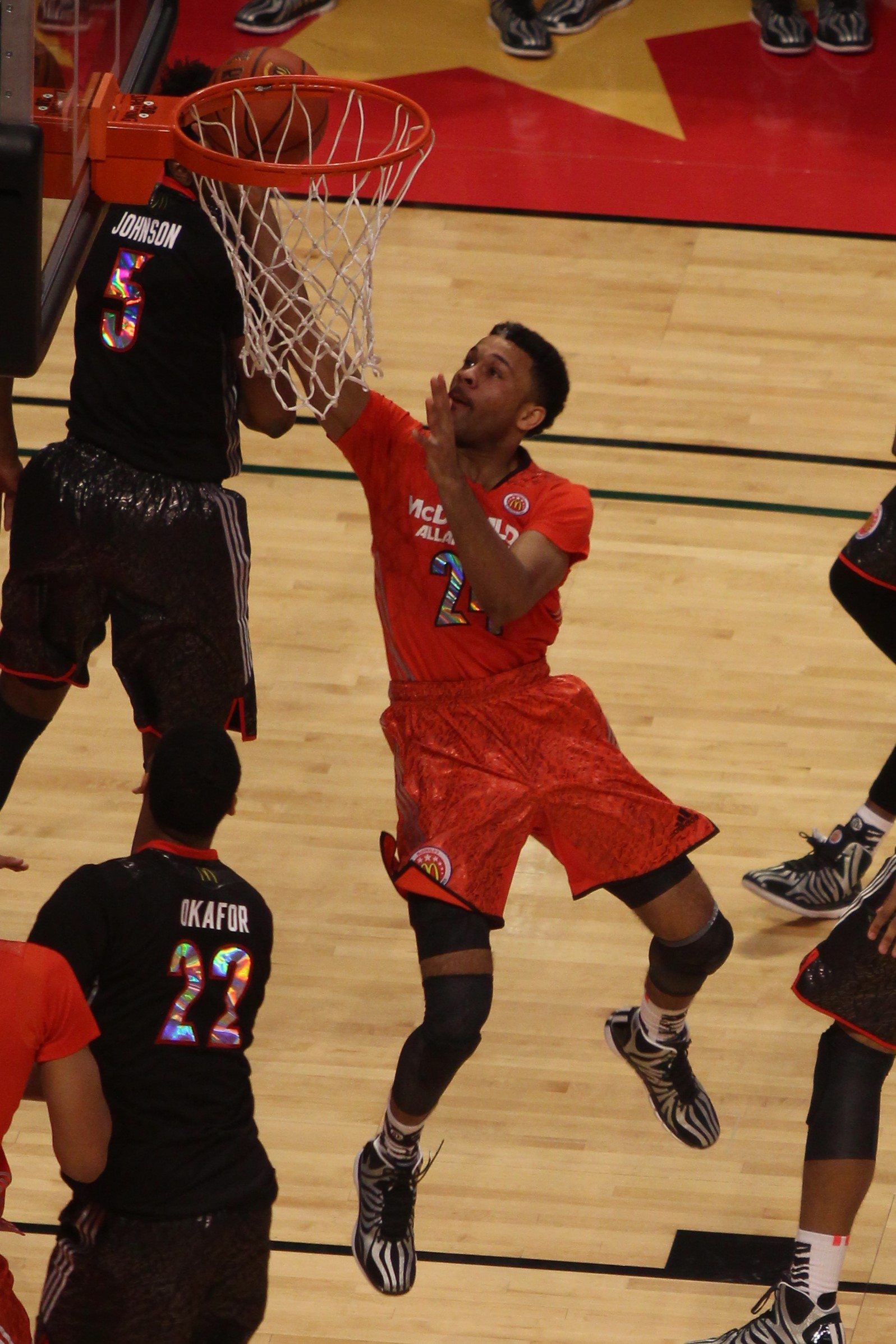
James Blackmon, Jr. in the 2014 McDonald's All-American Boys Game

College recruiting
Name	Hometown	School	Height	Weight	Commit date
Robert Johnson; G	Chesterfield, VA	Benedictine School	6 ft 3 in (1.91 m)	180 lb (82 kg)	Sep 20, 2013
Robert Johnson; G	Recruit ratings: Scout: Rivals: 247Sports: ESPN:				
Max Hoetzel; SF	Calabasas, CA	Wilbraham and Monson Academy	6 ft 7 in (2.01 m)	210 lb (95 kg)	Oct 27, 2013
Max Hoetzel; SF	Recruit ratings: Scout: Rivals: 247Sports: ESPN:				
James Blackmon Jr. G	Marion, IN	Marion HS	6 ft 4 in (1.93 m)	180 lb (82 kg)	Oct 31, 2013
James Blackmon Jr. G	Recruit ratings: Scout: Rivals: 247Sports: ESPN:				
Jeremiah April; C	Tolleson, AZ	Westwind Preparatory Academy	7 ft 1 in (2.16 m)	235 lb (107 kg)	Apr 18, 2014
Jeremiah April; C	Recruit ratings: Scout: Rivals: 247Sports: ESPN:				
Tim Priller; PF	Richland Hills, TX	Richland HS	6 ft 9 in (2.06 m)	210 lb (95 kg)	Apr 26, 2014
Tim Priller; PF	Recruit ratings: Scout: Rivals: 247Sports: ESPN:				
Emmitt Holt; PF	Webster, NY	Webster Schroeder HS	6 ft 7 in (2.01 m)	230 lb (100 kg)	Aug 20, 2014
Emmitt Holt; PF	Recruit ratings: Scout: Rivals: 247Sports: ESPN:				
Overall recruit ranking: Scout: 23 Rivals: 19 247Sports: 17 ESPN: 21
Note: In many cases, Scout, Rivals, 247Sports, On3, and ESPN may conflict in their listings of height and weight.; In these cases, the average was taken. ESPN grades are on a 100-point scale.; Sources: "Indiana Commit List for 2014". Rivals.; "Indiana Hoosiers". ESPN.; "2014 Team Ranking". Rivals.

== Roster ==
2014–15 Indiana Hoosiers men's basketball team
Players
Coaches

Pos.	#	Name	Height	Weight	Year	Previous school	Hometown
G	1	James Blackmon Jr.	6 ft 4 in (1.93 m)	195 lb (88 kg)	Fr	Marion High School	Fort Wayne, Indiana
G	2	Nick Zeisloft	6 ft 4 in (1.93 m)	190 lb (86 kg)	Sr	Lyons Township HS / Illinois St	La Grange, Illinois
F	3	Max Hoetzel	6 ft 9 in (2.06 m)	220 lb (100 kg)	Fr	Wilbraham & Monson Academy	Calabasas, California
G	4	Robert Johnson	6 ft 3 in (1.91 m)	195 lb (88 kg)	Fr	Benedictine School	Richmond, Virginia
F	5	Troy Williams	6 ft 7 in (2.01 m)	215 lb (98 kg)	So	Oak Hill Academy	Hampton, Virginia
F	10	Ryan Burton (W)	6 ft 7 in (2.01 m)	210 lb (95 kg)	RS Jr	Bedford North Lawrence HS / Bellarmine	Bedford, Indiana
G	11	Yogi Ferrell (C)	6 ft 0 in (1.83 m)	180 lb (82 kg)	Jr	Park Tudor School	Indianapolis, Indiana
F	12	Hanner Mosquera-Perea	6 ft 9 in (2.06 m)	230 lb (104 kg)	Jr	La Lumiere School	Istmina, Colombia
F	15	Devin Davis	6 ft 7 in (2.01 m)	230 lb (104 kg)	So	Warren Central	Indianapolis, Indiana
G	22	Stanford Robinson	6 ft 4 in (1.93 m)	205 lb (93 kg)	So	Findlay Prep	Landover, Maryland
F	23	Nate Ritchie (W)	6 ft 7 in (2.01 m)	215 lb (98 kg)	Fr	Northridge High School	Middlebury, Indiana
F	25	Emmitt Holt	6 ft 7 in (2.01 m)	225 lb (102 kg)	Fr	Vermont Academy	Webster, New York
F	30	Collin Hartman	6 ft 6 in (1.98 m)	215 lb (98 kg)	So	Cathedral	Indianapolis, Indiana
F	35	Tim Priller	6 ft 9 in (2.06 m)	220 lb (100 kg)	Fr	Richland High School	North Richland Hills, Texas
C	44	Jeremiah April	7 ft 0 in (2.13 m)	240 lb (109 kg)	Fr	Westwind Preparatory Academy	Phoenix, Arizona

Head coach

- Tom Crean

Assistant coach(es)

- Steve McClain
- Tim Buckley
- Chuck Martin

Legend

- (C) Team captain
- (S) Suspended
- (I) Ineligible
- (W) Walk-on
- Injured
- Current redshirt

Roster
Last update: 2014-08-20

== Schedule ==
Date time, TV	Rank^{#}	Opponent^{#}	Result	Record	High points	High rebounds	High assists	Site (attendance) city, state
Foreign trip
Aug 8*; 7:00 pm		vs. Laval	W 110–70	–	22 – Ferrell	16 – Davis	6 – Ferrell	Brebeuf College (–); Montreal, Quebec
Aug 10*; 3:00 pm		vs. No. 2 Ottawa	L 101–109	–	27 – Williams	5 – Blackmon Jr.	6 – Johnson	Champlain College Saint-Lambert (–); Montreal, Quebec
Aug 11*; 6:00 pm		vs. No. 1 Carleton	W 95–85	–	21 – Ferrell	6 – Tied	4 – Tied	Ravens' Nest (–); Ottawa, Ontario
Aug 12*; 7:00 pm		vs. No. 6 McGill	W 96–69	–	21 – Blackmon Jr.	9 – Williams	4 – Tied	G. Donald Love Competition Hall (266); Montreal, Quebec
Aug 13*; 1:00 pm		vs. Quebec-Montréal	W 109–77	–	21 – Williams	10 – Davis	4 – Tied	(–); Montreal, Quebec
Exhibition
Nov 6*; 7:00 pm		Northwood	W 94–70	–	26 – Blackmon, Jr.	12 – Mosquera-Perea	6 – Ferrell	Assembly Hall (17,293); Bloomington, IN
Nov 10*; 7:00 pm, BTN		Indianapolis	W 76–63	–	19 – Ferrell	10 – Johnson	5 – Ferrell	Assembly Hall (17,296); Bloomington, IN
Non-conference regular season
Nov 14*; 7:00 pm, BTN		Mississippi Valley State	W 116–65	1–0	25 – Blackmon, Jr.	12 – Mosquera-Perea	5 – Tied	Assembly Hall (17,349); Bloomington, IN
Nov 17*; 6:00 pm, BTN		Texas Southern; Hoosiers Showcase	W 83–64	2–0	21 – Johnson	6 – Zeisloft	7 – Ferrell	Assembly Hall (17,243); Bloomington, IN
Nov 20*; 8:00 pm, BTN		No. 22 SMU; Hoosiers Showcase	W 74–68	3–0	26 – Blackmon, Jr.	7 – Blackmon, Jr.	7 – Ferrell	Assembly Hall (17,472); Bloomington, IN
Nov 22*; 8:00 pm, BTN		Lamar; Hoosiers Showcase	W 85–72	4–0	21 – Blackmon, Jr.	6 – Blackmon, Jr.	3 – Tied	Assembly Hall (12,203); Bloomington, IN
Nov 24*; 7:30 pm, ESPNews		Eastern Washington; Hoosiers Showcase	L 86–88	4–1	27 – Ferrell	9 – Williams	7 – Ferrell	Assembly Hall (11,636); Bloomington, IN
Nov 28*; 9:00 pm, BTN		UNC Greensboro	W 87–79	5–1	24 – Blackmon, Jr.	9 – Blackmon, Jr.	6 – Ferrell	Assembly Hall (12,285); Bloomington, IN
Dec 2*; 7:00 pm, ESPN2		Pittsburgh; ACC–Big Ten Challenge	W 81–69	6–1	15 – Holt	6 – Hartman	9 – Johnson	Assembly Hall (17,472); Bloomington, IN
Dec 6*; 7:30 pm, BTN		Savannah State	W 95–49	7–1	18 – Tied	7 – Johnson	7 – Ferrell	Assembly Hall (17,472); Bloomington, IN
Dec 9*; 9:00 pm, ESPN		vs. No. 4 Louisville; Jimmy V Classic	L 74–94	7–2	18 – Blackmon, Jr.	7 – Ferrell	5 – Ferrell	Madison Square Garden (11,617); New York City, NY
Dec 13*; 5:00 pm, BTN		Grand Canyon	W 94–66	8–2	18 – Blackmon, Jr.	8 – Williams	3 – Tied	Assembly Hall (17,472); Bloomington, IN
Dec 20*; 2:30 pm, FS1		vs. No. 23 Butler; Crossroads Classic	W 82–73	9–2	22 – Williams	11 – Williams	3 – Tied	Bankers Life Fieldhouse (14,753); Indianapolis, IN
Dec 22*; 7:00 pm		New Orleans	W 79–59	10–2	17 – Ferrell	7 – Hartman	4 – Ferrell	Assembly Hall (13,182); Bloomington, IN
Dec 27*; 12:00 pm, ESPN2		vs. Georgetown; Indeed Invitational	L 87–91 ^{OT}	10–3	27 – Ferrell	8 – Williams	4 – Williams	Madison Square Garden (8,651); New York City, NY
Big Ten regular season
Dec 31; 5:30 pm, BTN		at Nebraska	W 70–65	11–3 (1–0)	14 – Johnson	10 – Mosquera-Perea	8 – Ferrell	Pinnacle Bank Arena (14,987); Lincoln, NE
Jan 5; 7:00 pm, BTN		at Michigan State	L 50–70	11–4 (1–1)	17 – Ferrell	6 – Tied	3 – Tied	Breslin Center (14,797); East Lansing, MI
Jan 10; 12:00 pm, ESPN		No. 22 Ohio State	W 69–66	12–4 (2–1)	18 – Blackmon, Jr.	12 – Williams	3 – Williams	Assembly Hall (15,563); Bloomington, IN
Jan 13; 7:00 pm, BTN		Penn State	W 76–73	13–4 (3–1)	20 – Johnson	6 – Blackmon, Jr.	6 – Ferrell	Assembly Hall (17,472); Bloomington, IN
Jan 18; 1:00 pm, BTN		at Illinois; Rivalry	W 80–74	14–4 (4–1)	21 – Tied	9 – Williams	9 – Ferrell	State Farm Center (17,085); Champaign, IL
Jan 22; 9:00 pm, ESPNU	No. 23	No. 13 Maryland	W 89–70	15–4 (5–1)	24 – Ferrell	7 – Williams	5 – Ferrell	Assembly Hall (17,472); Bloomington, IN
Jan 25; 1:30 pm, CBS	No. 23	at Ohio State	L 70–82	15–5 (5–2)	26 – Ferrell	5 – Holt	3 – Tied	Value City Arena (17,322); Columbus, OH
Jan 28; 9:00 pm, BTN	No. 22	at Purdue; Rivalry/Indiana National Guard Governor's Cup	L 67–83	15–6 (5–3)	21 – Ferrell	6 – Williams	3 – Ferrell	Mackey Arena (14,846); West Lafayette, IN
Jan 31; 3:15 pm, BTN	No. 22	Rutgers	W 72–64	16–6 (6–3)	20 – Blackmon, Jr.	12 – Williams	3 – Ferrell	Assembly Hall (17,472); Bloomington, IN
Feb 3; 7:00 pm, ESPN	No. 25	at No. 5 Wisconsin	L 78–92	16–7 (6–4)	17 – Zeisloft	7 – Williams	4 – Ferrell	Kohl Center (17,279); Madison, WI
Feb 8; 1:00 pm, CBS	No. 25	Michigan	W 70–67	17–7 (7–4)	20 – Williams	8 – Tied	6 – Ferrell	Assembly Hall (17,472); Bloomington, IN
Feb 11; 9:00 pm, BTN		at No. 19 Maryland	L 66–68	17–8 (7–5)	23 – Ferrell	7 – Williams	6 – Ferrell	Xfinity Center (15,304); College Park, MD
Feb 15; 7:30 pm, BTN		Minnesota	W 90–71	18–8 (8–5)	24 – Blackmon, Jr.	9 – Williams	11 – Ferrell	Assembly Hall (17,472); Bloomington, IN
Feb 19; 7:00 pm, ESPN		Purdue; Rivalry/Indiana National Guard Governor's Cup	L 63–67	18–9 (8–6)	21 – Ferrell	7 – Williams	4 – Tied	Assembly Hall (17,472); Bloomington, IN
Feb 22; 5:15 pm, BTN		at Rutgers	W 84–54	19–9 (9–6)	17 – Tied	9 – Williams	6 – Ferrell	The RAC (7,402); Piscataway, NJ
Feb 25; 7:00 pm, BTN		at Northwestern	L 65–72	19–10 (9–7)	21 – Williams	14 – Williams	5 – Ferrell	Welsh-Ryan Arena (7,014); Evanston, IL
Mar 3; 7:00 pm, ESPN		Iowa	L 63–77	19–11 (9–8)	15 – Zeisloft	13 – Williams	4 – Williams	Assembly Hall (17,472); Bloomington, IN
Mar 7; 12:00 pm, ESPN		Michigan State	L 72–74	19–12 (9–9)	21 – Ferrell	7 – Tied	6 – Ferrell	Assembly Hall (17,472); Bloomington, IN
Big Ten tournament
Mar 12; 6:30 pm, ESPN2		vs. Northwestern; Second Round	W 71–56	20–12	25 – Blackmon, Jr.	12 – Williams	7 – Blackmon, Jr.	United Center (16,549); Chicago, IL
Mar 13; 6:30 pm, BTN		vs. No. 8 Maryland; Quarterfinals	L 69–75	20–13	18 – Ferrell	12 – Holt	3 – Ferrell	United Center (17,230); Chicago, IL
NCAA tournament
Mar 20*; 2:45 pm, CBS	(10 MW)	vs. (7 MW) No. 14 Wichita State; Second Round	L 76–81	20–14	24 – Ferrell	12 – Williams	4 – Williams	CenturyLink Center (17,557); Omaha, NE
*Non-conference game. ^{#}Rankings from AP Poll. (#) Tournament seedings in parentheses. MW=Midwest Region. All times are in Eastern Time.

== Rankings ==
Ranking movements Legend: ██ Increase in ranking ██ Decrease in ranking — = Not ranked RV = Received votes
	Week																			
Poll	Pre	2	3	4	5	6	7	8	9	10	11	12	13	14	15	16	17	18	19	Final
AP	—	—	RV	—	RV	—	RV	RV	RV	RV	23	22	RV	RV	RV	—	—	—	—	N/A
Coaches	—	—	RV	—	—	—	RV	RV	RV	RV	23	21	25	RV	RV	—	—	—	—	—

== See also ==
- 2014–15 Indiana Hoosiers women's basketball team
