= John Moss =

John Moss may refer to:

- Jack Moss (John Francis Moss, 1928–2004), American foreign service officer
- John Moss (barrister) (1890–1976), British social services worker
- John Moss (Philadelphia) (1771–1847), Philadelphia merchant, Parnas (President) of Congregation Mikveh Israel involved in the Damascus Affair
- John Moss (umpire) (1864–1950), English cricket umpire
- John C. Moss (1838–1892), American inventor
- John E. Moss (1915–1997), U.S. Representative from California
- John Francis Moss (educational administrator) (1844-1907), Sheffield education pioneer
- John Errington Moss (born 1940), Canadian author
- John Henry Moss (1918–2009), American baseball executive and politician
- John Thomas Moss (1839–1880), American frontiersman, prospector, and miner
- Johnny Moss (1907–1995), American poker player
- Jon Moss (born 1957), British rock drummer
- J. McKenzie Moss (1868–1929), American politician and judge

== See also ==
- Jonathan Moss (disambiguation)
- Johnny Most (1923–1993), Boston Celtics announcer
