= Vonleh =

Vonleh is a surname. Notable people with the surname include:

- Blahsue Vonleh (1865–1947), Liberian politician
- Noah Vonleh (born 1995), American basketball player
