= Dan art =

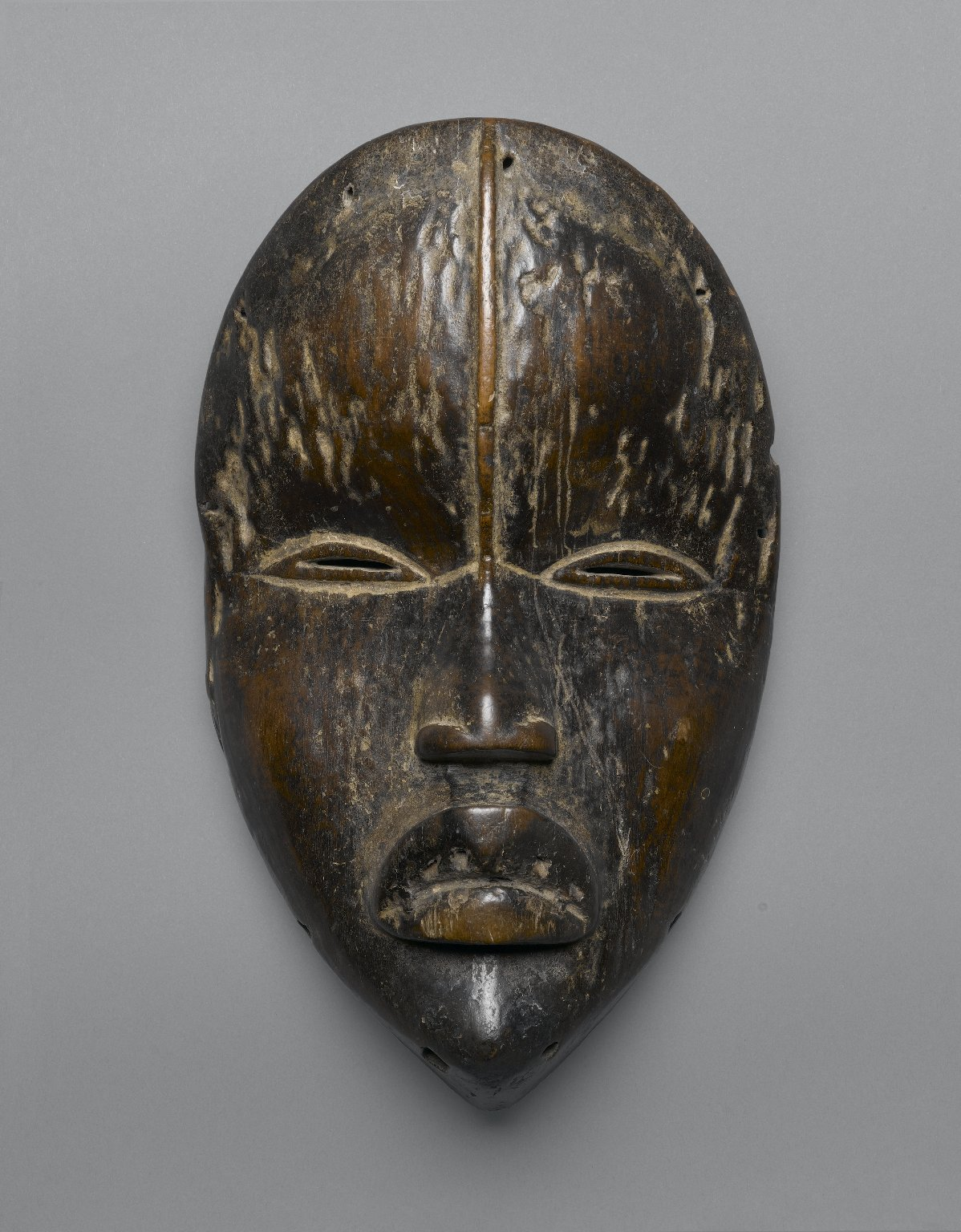
Dan deangle mask, from the collection of the Brooklyn Museum

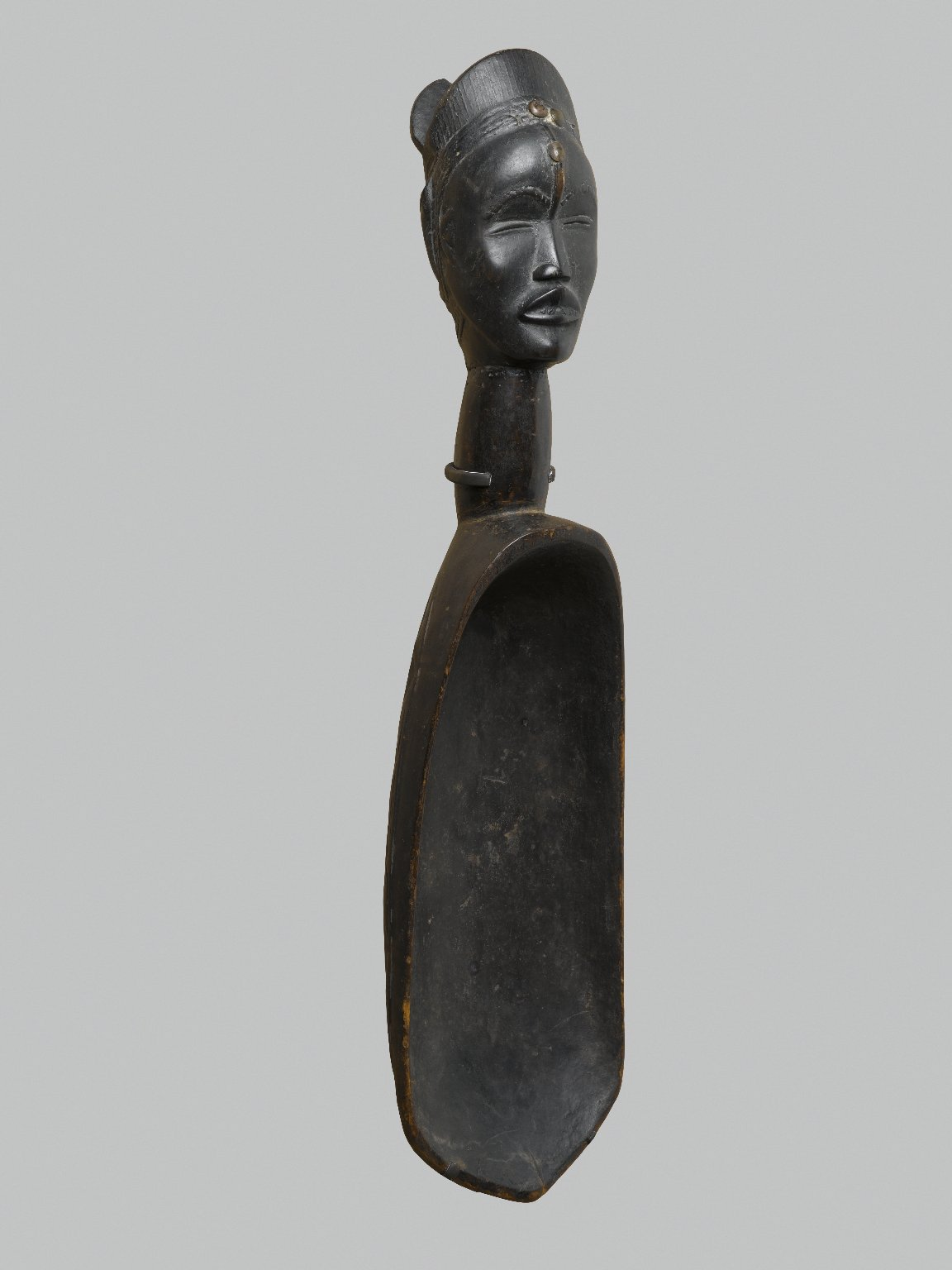
Dan feast ladle (wunkermian), from the collection of the Brooklyn Museum

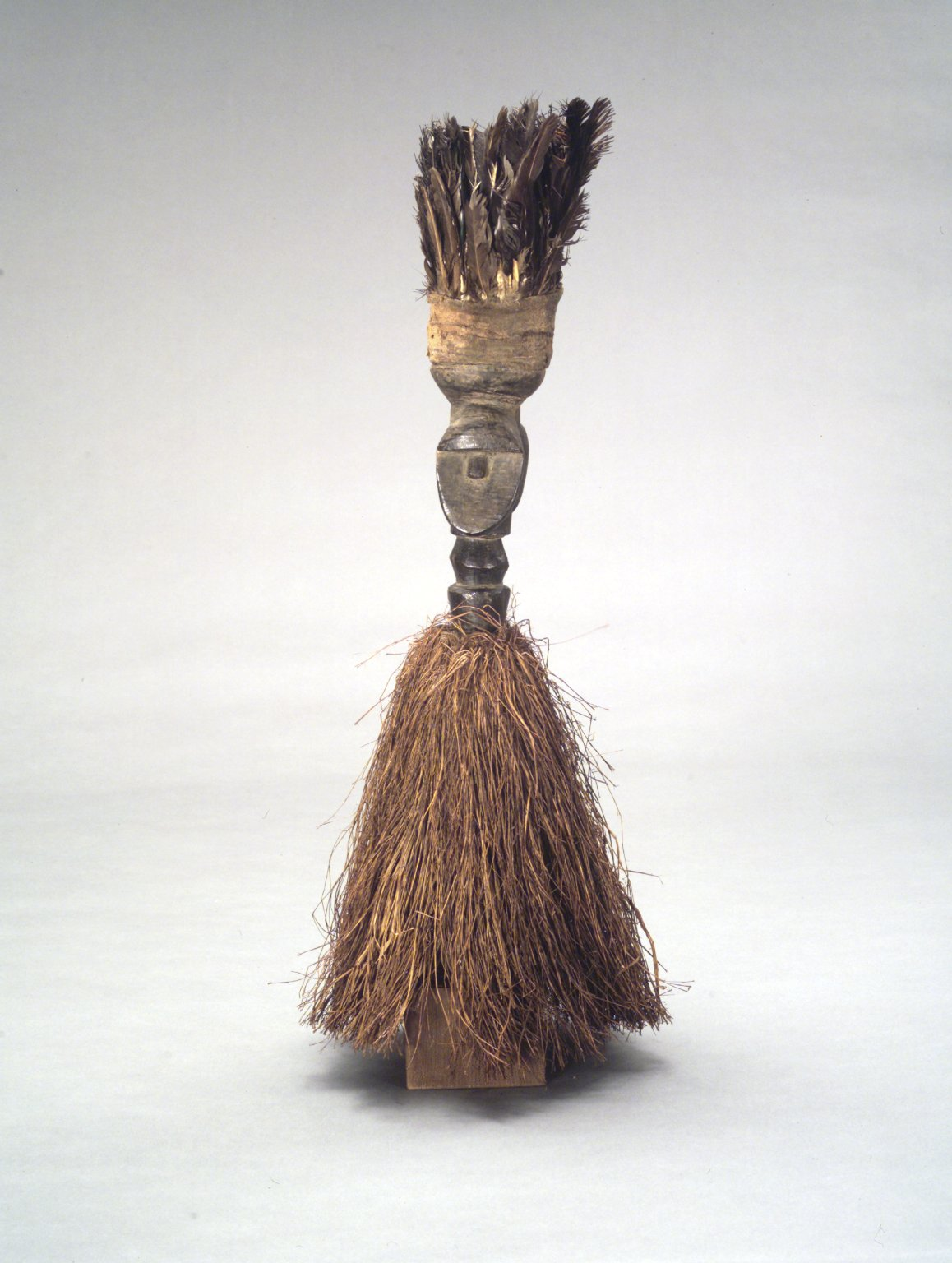
Janus-faced staff, from the collection of the Brooklyn Museum

Dan art is created by the Dan people of Liberia and the Ivory Coast.

== Masks ==
Masks are the most important art form of the Dan people of Liberia. They are perceived to embody the most powerful of spirit forces, called ge or gle.

== Feast Ladles ==
The wunkirmian is a large ceremonial ladle that is carved to honor a particular woman who has distinguished herself through generosity or hospitality. The wunkirmian is owned by the wunkirle, who is considered the "most hospitable woman" of her village quarter. Traditionally, she chooses her own successor.

Curator Barbara C. Johnson describes the role of the feast ladle in a Dan feast: "At feast times [the wunkirle] marches with her spoon at the head of the line of women from her quarter. Each woman carries a pot of cooked rice or soup. The wunkirle either distributes to the food to the guests, or more frequently uses her ladle to indicate the distribution. At some feasts the wurkirlone of a village compete with each other in generosity by distributing small gifts of peanuts, candy, coins and other foods. The women dance at these times. The wunkirle's prestige may be indicated by her being carried in a hammock through the village by the women of her quarter. They also contribute gifts of their own, but always in the name of the wurkirle."

Besides acting as "emblems of honor," feast ladles have spiritual power. According to the Dan, the ladles embody du and contain the power of the wunkirle. The wunkirmiam is for the woman what the masks are for the men; wunkirmiam are the woman's chief liaison with the power of the spirit world and the symbol of that connection. Like masks, each wunkirmian is given its own name.

The most common form of the wunkirmian has a handle carved as a human head that displays the characteristic of the buangle mask: narrow eyes and an oval face. The face on the ladle depicts a specific woman.

== Carved wooden heads on pedestals or staffs ==
Janus-faced heads on a staff are reported to be carried by certain masked performers. The two faces looking in opposite directions symbolize the supernatural ability of the gle to see in all directions.

Like feast ladles, these heads are considered powerful spiritual objects that act as receptacles for du. Some are created as portraits of deceased family members that embody that person's spirit.

== Brass Casting ==
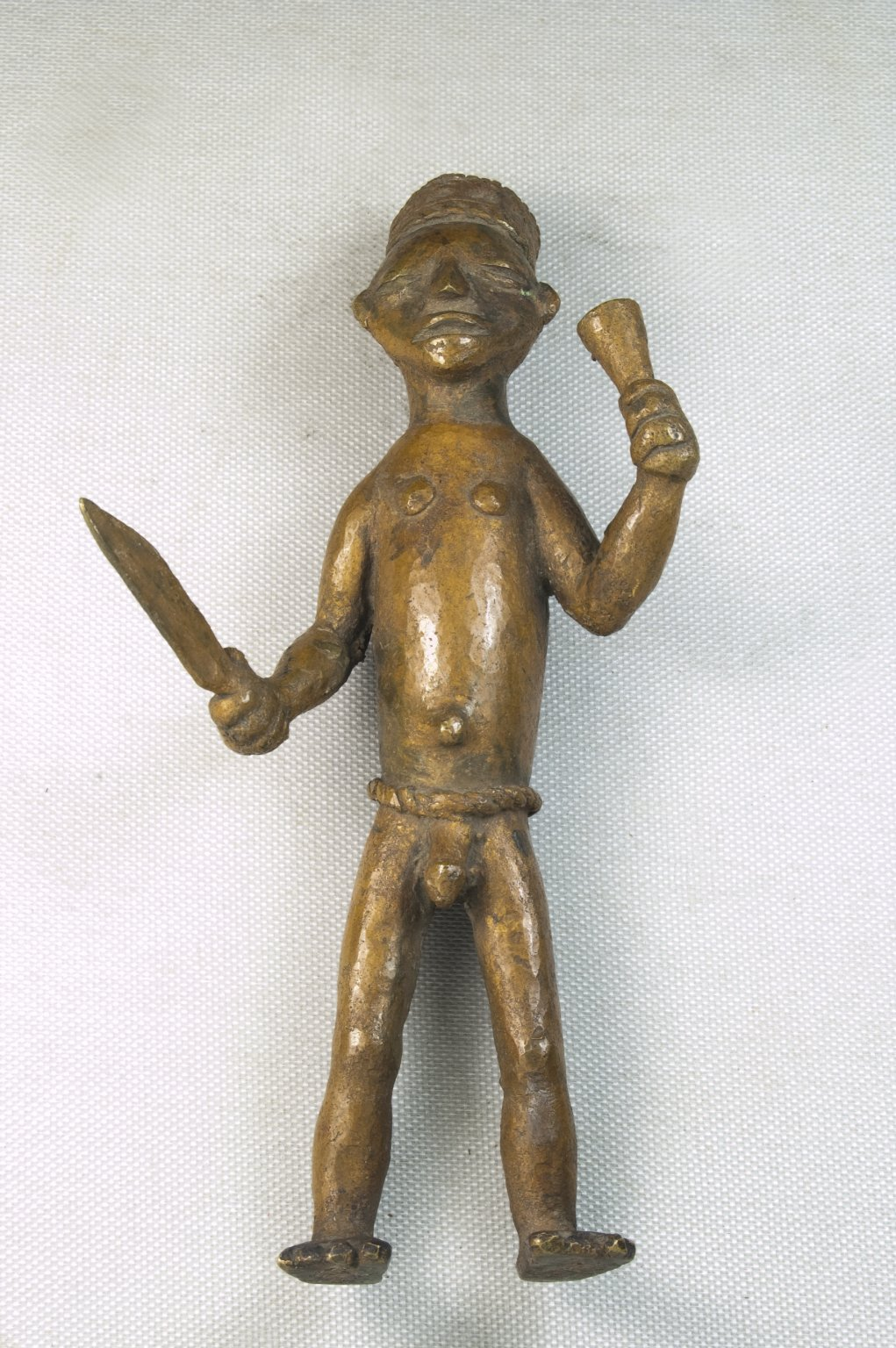
Male Nude Holding Knife and Horn, Brooklyn Museum

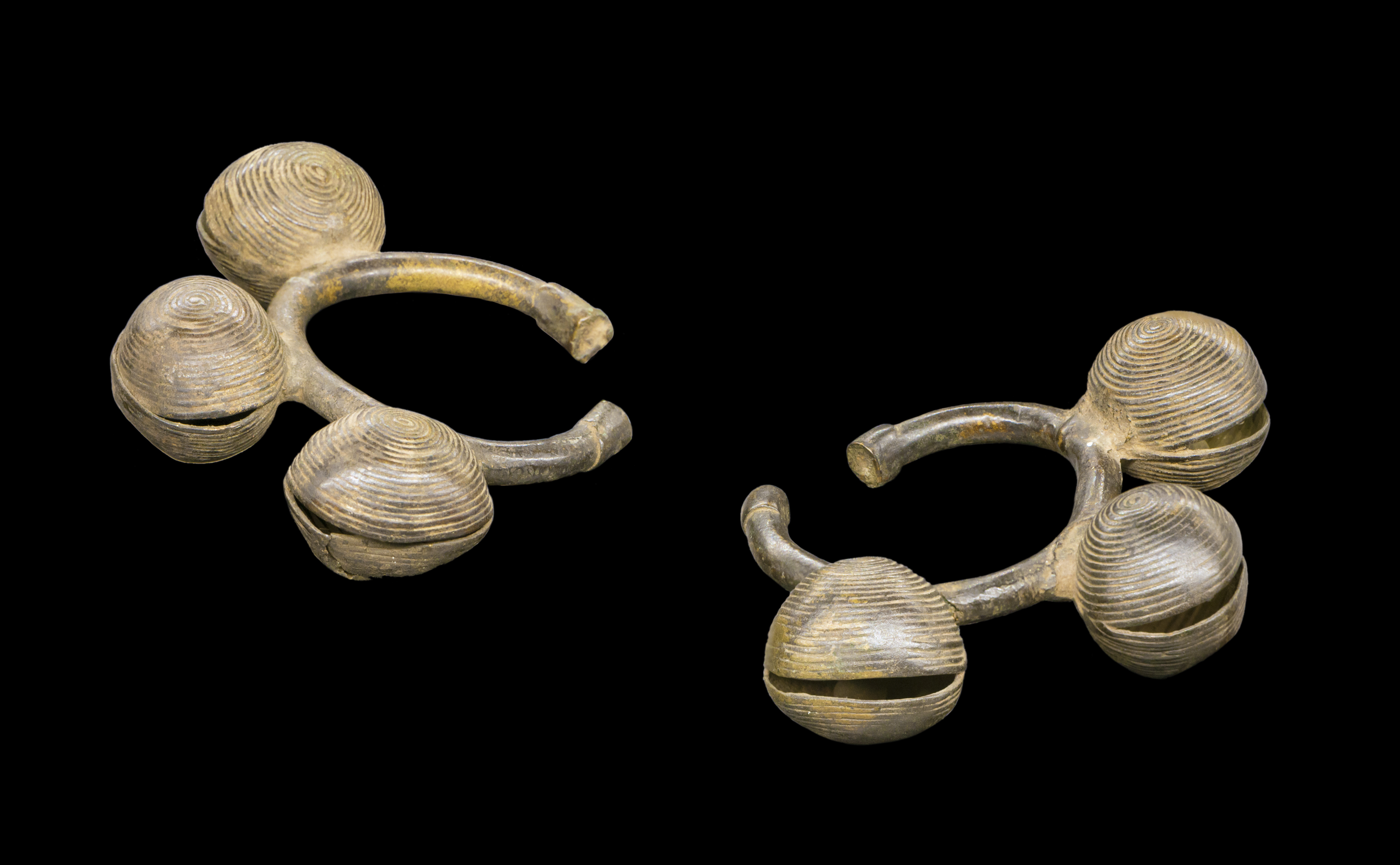
Ankle bracelets MHNT

It is difficult to determine the antiquity of brass casting among the Dan, but it is clear that the practice began at least in the early 19th century if not much earlier. Some scholars believe that the We people to the East may have introduced the practice to the Dan. Brass casting was a practice of Dan blacksmiths. In Dan communities, the blacksmith was always awarded a high status because he was responsible for agricultural tools and weapons. Brass-casting took place at night to protect the object from onlookers. Brass-casters created brass objects using the cire-perdue, or lost wax method.

By the late 1930s, a Liberian government decree outlawing all brass jewelry resulted in an abundance of brass, which brass-casters used to create figurative sculptures. Typically, figures stand at about 8 inches tall and carry objects of cultural importance in their hands. The figures were made principally as prestige items.
