= Blahsue Vonleh =

Liberian politician

Chief Blahsue Vonleh (c. 1865 – September 28, 1947) was Paramount Chief of the Doe clan in Nimba County, Liberia from 1920 until his death in 1947.

Vonleh was born to the Dan tribe, who are mainly situated in the northern part of Liberia, in Zuaplay, Nimba County. He fought many tribal battles in defense of his clan and was made Paramount Chief based on his valor and skill on the battlefield.

Vonleh attended the inauguration of Liberia's 19th President, William V.S. Tubman, as member of the tribal delegation in 1944 in the capital of Monrovia.

Vonleh Village in Liberia was named in his honor and is headed by his son, Chief Tarkpour Vonleh. One of his descendants is his great-grandson American basketball player Noah Vonleh. Moses Blah, who succeeded Charles Taylor as President of Liberia, also hails from Nimba county.
