= Jonathan Moss =

Jonathan Moss may refer to:

- Jonathan Moss (cricketer) (born 1975), Australian first-class cricketer
- Jonathan Moss, a character in the Southern Victory series by Harry Turtledove
- Jonathan Moss (referee) (born 1970), English football referee
- Jonathan Moss (rower), American lightweight rower
- Jon Moss (born 1957), drummer

== See also ==
- John Moss (disambiguation)
