= Dan masks =

Masks made and worn by the Dan people

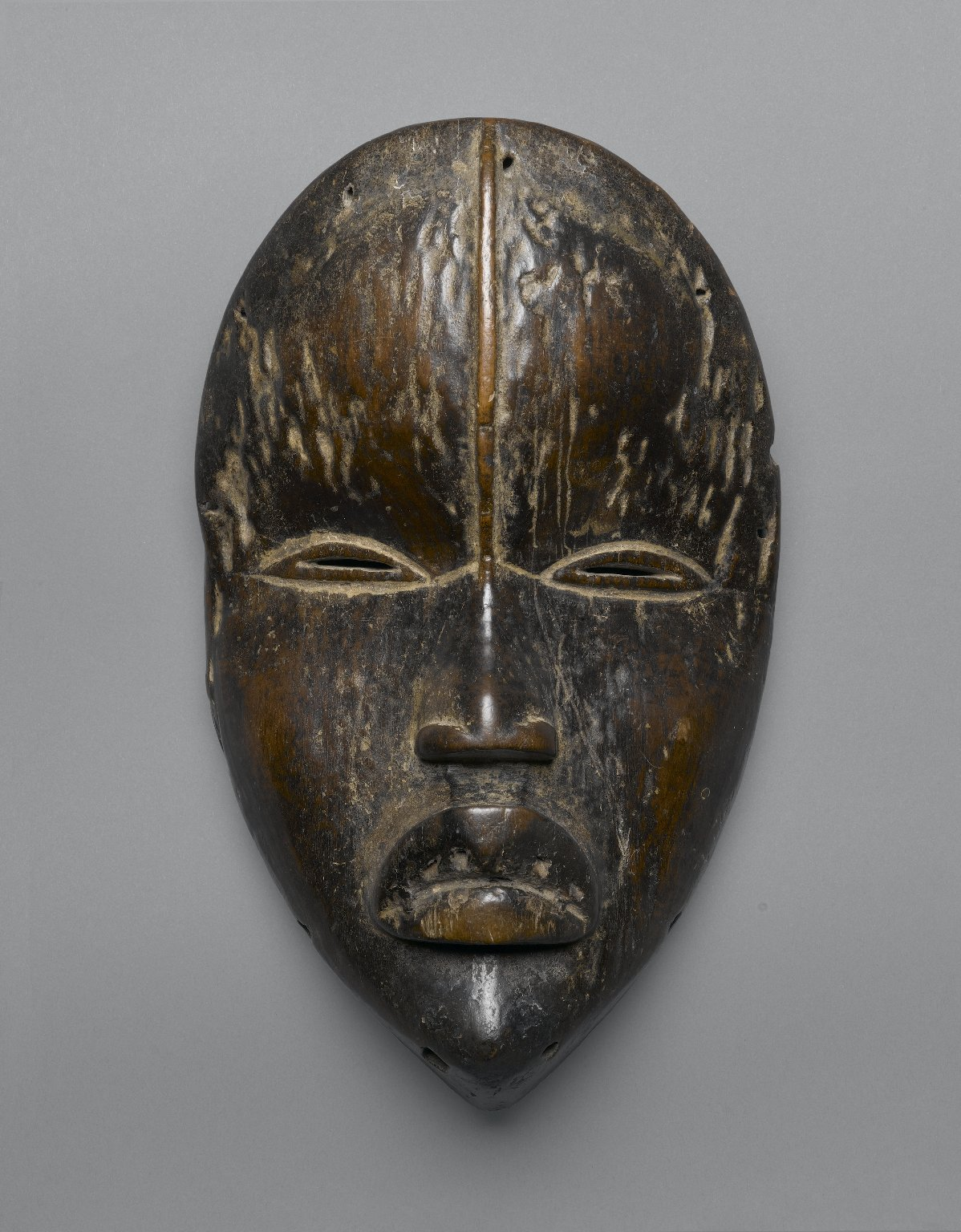
Dan dean gle mask, from the collection of the Brooklyn Museum

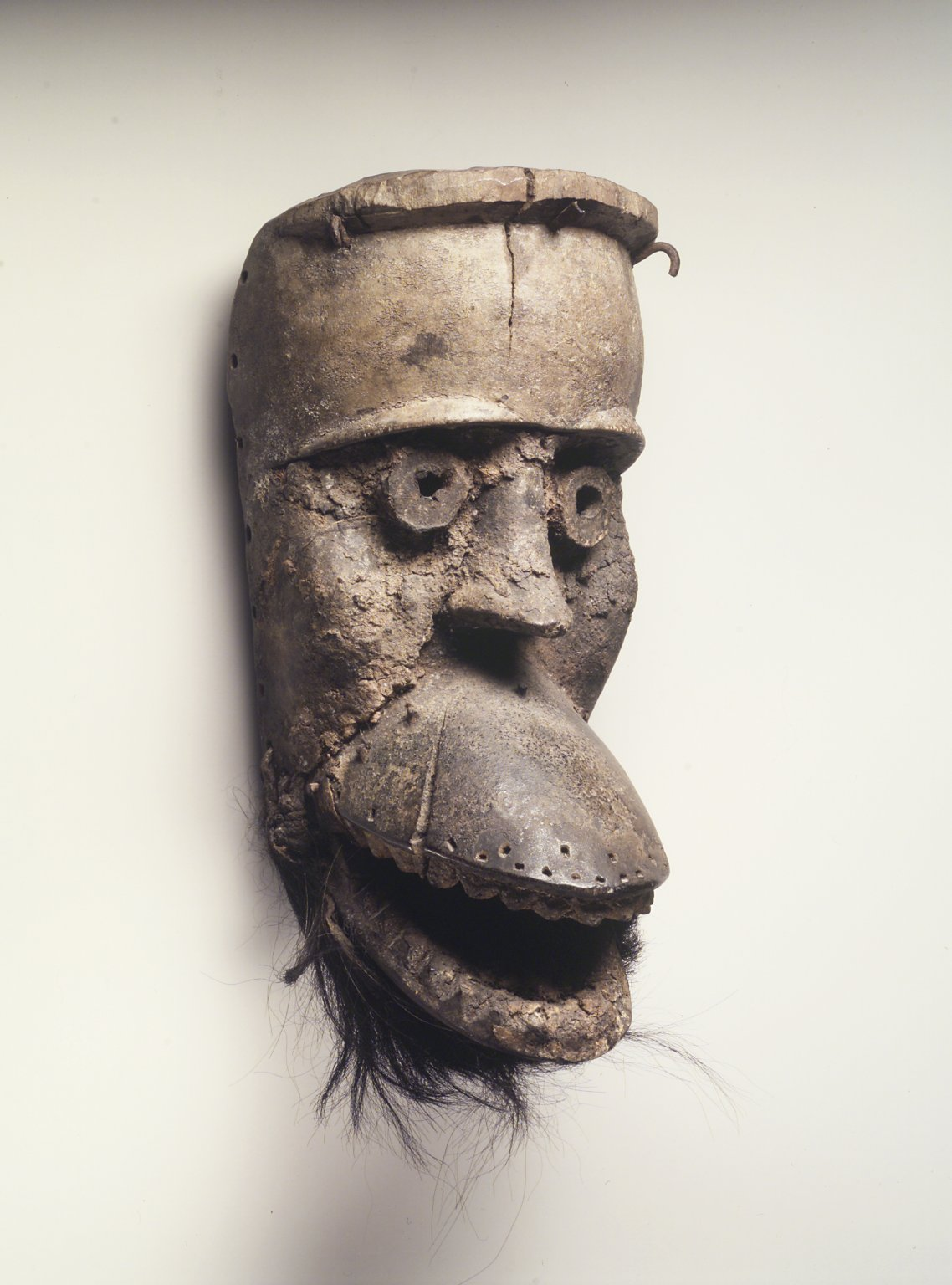
Dan bu gle mask, from the collection of the Brooklyn Museum

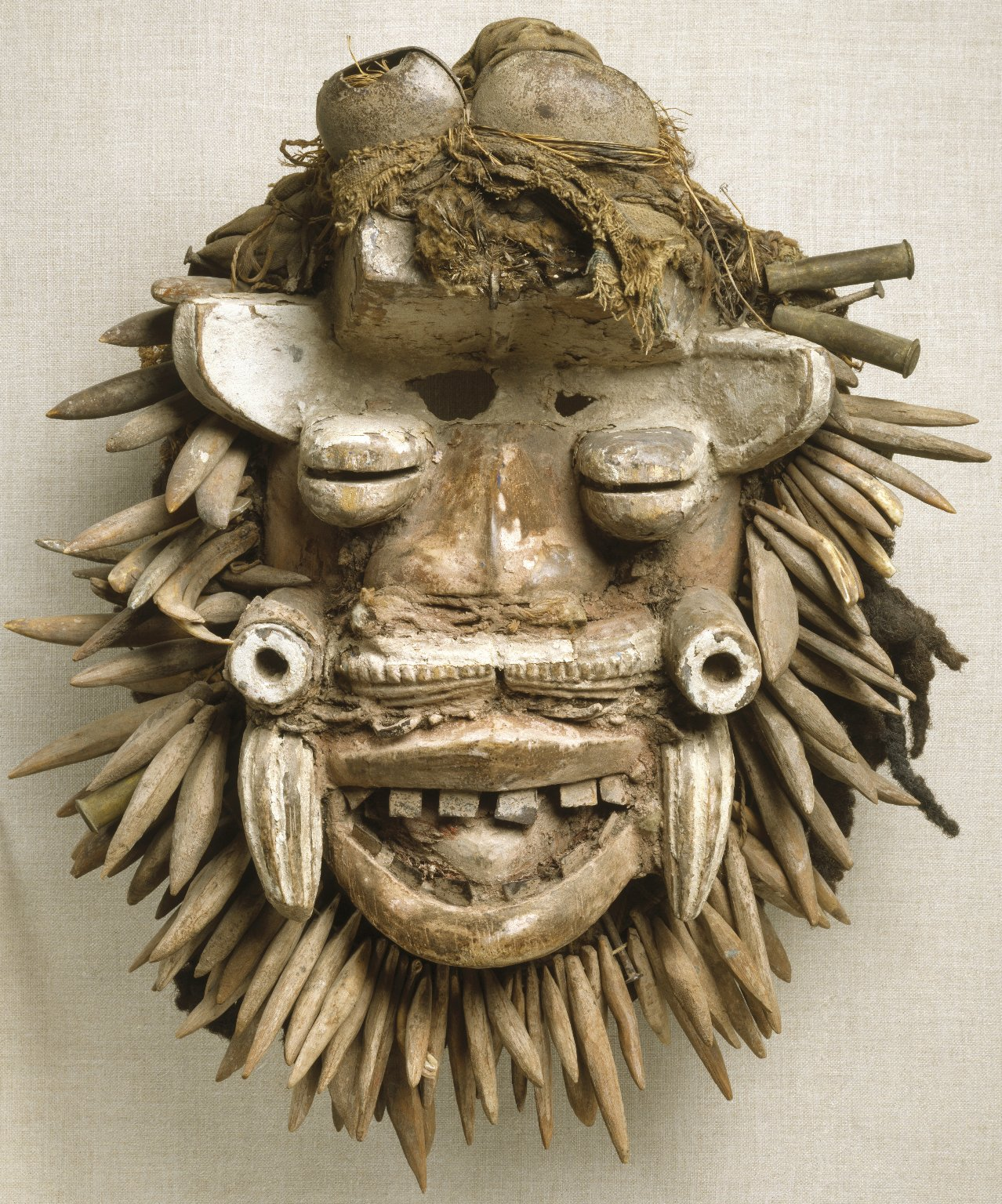
Von Gla mask, from the collection of the Brooklyn Museum

Masks are the most important art form of the Dan people of Liberia. The Dan people refer to these masks as gle or ge, terms that refers both to the physical mask and the individual spirits the mask is believed to embody during masquerade performances.

== Gle ==
Scholars use the terms ge and gle interchangeably to refer both to Dan masks and to invisible, supernatural spirit forces that live in the forest but esteem to enter the civilized world of the village. The only way they can do this, the Dan believe, is through masquerade.

In order for a gle to be embodied during a masquerade, an initiated member of a Dan men's society must have a dream that reveals the exact nature of the gle, its intended function, and the masquerade through which the gle would manifest. The council of elders, once they are told of the dream, decides whether the masquerade ensemble should be created for that man to wear and perform.

The wooden gle is accompanied by a full-body costume constructed of raffia, feathers and fur. It is believed that each gle has its own personality, preferences, dance and speech patterns and is given a personal name. The wearer of the mask takes on all of these qualities during the masquerade. Having come from the dark, mysterious realm of the forest, a gle is believed to be unpredictable. Therefore, an attendant always accompanies the gle masquerader to control it and interpret its speech.

== Dean gle and Bu gle masks ==
Gle can be divided into two categories: that of dean gle, which is a gentle, peaceful gle without a gender, but whose qualities are thought of as feminine and that of bu gle, which is the war gle named after the sound of a gunshot, whose qualities are thought of as masculine.

The dean gle mask represents an idealized version of Dan beauty. It is characterized by narrow eyes, an oval shape, a smooth forehead, and a mouth slightly open to expose teeth. Dean gle's functions are to teach, entertain and nurture.

Bu gle masks are designed to frighten. Their eyes are depicted as protruding tubes and the surface of the face has boldly projecting angles. The most powerful bu gle masks are decorated with animal and human deposits such as bone and fur.

== Ma go, personal miniature masks ==
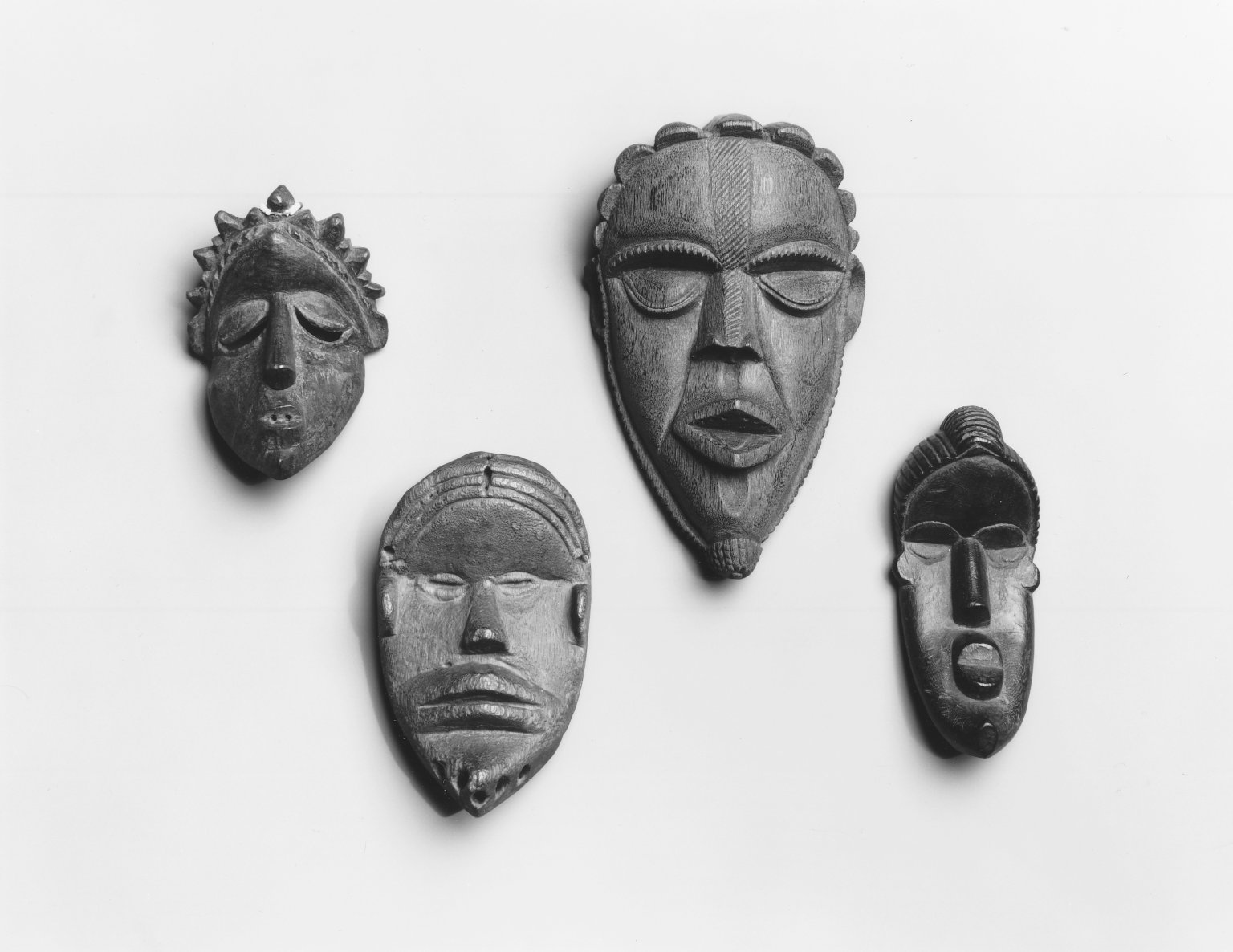
Dan personal miniature masks, from the collection of the Brooklyn Museum

Similar to gle masks, miniature masks are carved to embody du tutelary spirits, but their main function is the protection of their owner from harm. These masks may also be used in divination and as sacred objects upon which to swear an oath - thus ma go are treated like other sacred objects and are fed with ritual offerings and kept hidden from public display.

In some cases, an owner of a full-sized mask may carry a miniature version of the large mask to serve as a ma go.

== Mask classifications ==
Vandenhoute distinguished two large groups of masks: the gebande and the genome. Gebande is the most sacred examples of Dan masks while Genome is a lower rank of masks. The classifications relate to the content which the Dan attribute to the mask, rather than the appearance of the mask.

Gebande masks can be divided into a series of subgroups and categories:

Subgroups:

- Singers’ masks
- Dancers’ masks
- Storytellers’ masks
- Beggars’ masks (their primary job is the collecting of offerings for ancestors)

Categories:

- Gore or ancestor masks (the most sacred of masks)
- Gesuya or avenger masks (stands up to the Go master and the ancestors)
- Miniature masks (substitutes for Goge or Gesuya masks)
- Sagbwe masks (runners’ mask or fire watchers’ mask)

== Gle performance ==
Daniel B. Reed calls music the "fuel" that drives gle performance. Reed writes, "Performers use music to attract the spiritual power that enables them to solve sorcery conflicts and heal, manifesting Dan spiritual powers in collaboration with the Ivorian judiciary to combat socially destructive spiritual behaviors."

Contemporary gle performances incorporate elements of popular culture. For example, gle may reference technology, mention Jesus or Allah, incorporate mass-mediated popular music and sing or speak in many languages.

Before a gle can perform, his performance must first be approved be the proper authorities - those affiliated with the "sacred house" of a particular gle. A person or group of people may hire a gle, but in order to do so they must also present their reasons why, as well as where, when and how the gle will perform, to these same authorities. The process that the authorities undergo to determine whether the gle can perform is shrouded in secrecy, but essentially the authorities consult a powerful spirit, called the yinan, by "throwing" kola nuts, a process used in divination. If the answer is "yes" to the question of whether the gle can perform, then the cost of the performance is assessed and the performance planning begins.

There are a series of rules that must be followed in order for the gle to manifest. Many of these concern women, who are forbidden from seeing certain genu (pl. gle).
