= Dan people =

Ethnic group in West Africa

Dan / Yacouba / Danwopeumin people
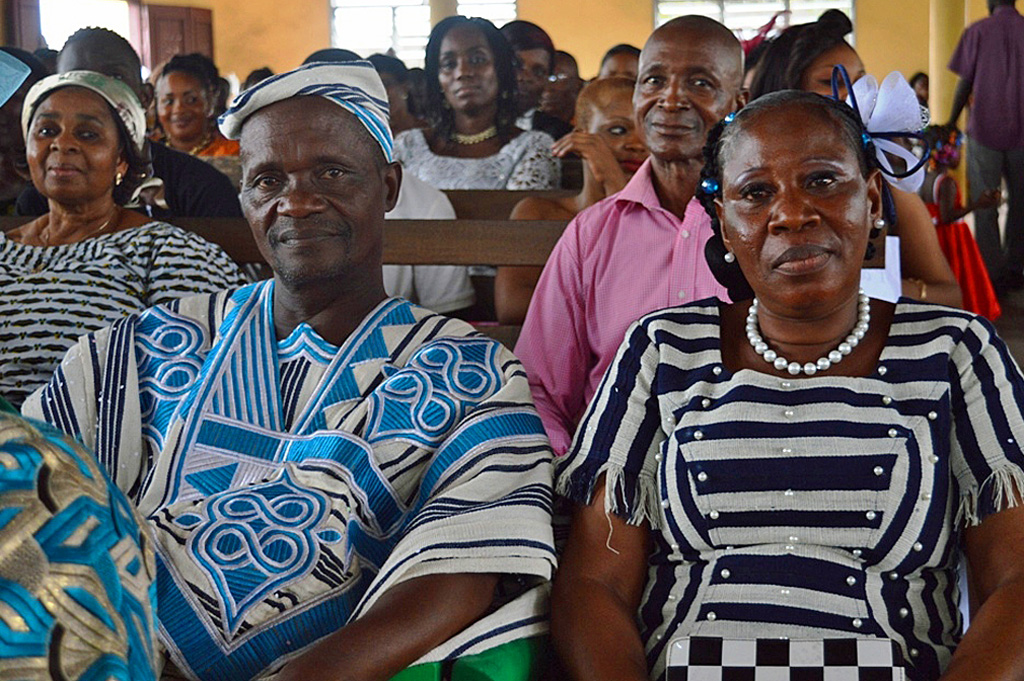
- Dan in traditional clothes

Total population
- c. 3 000 000

Regions with significant populations
- Ivory Coast: 1 932 000
- Liberia: 297 000

Languages
- Dan

Religion
- Animism; Christianity

Related ethnic groups
- Mano, Kpelle

The Dan or Mano-Dan are a Mande ethnic group from northwestern Ivory Coast and neighbouring Liberia. There are approximately 700000 members of the group and their largest settlement is Man, Ivory Coast. Neighboring peoples include the Krahn, Kpelle and Mano. They are officially known as Yacouba (or Yakouba). In Liberia, they are also known as Gio (Bassa for "slave"), which is considered a derogatory exonym.

They speak the Dan language, a Southern Mande language and are closely related to the Maghan people of the Ghana Empire and of the Gbara of the Mali Empire. The Dan are known for their art, especially their mask rituals (Ge or Gle), as well as their secret society, Gor. Gor (Dan for "leopard") is a peacemaking society, not to be confused with the brutal Ekpe (leopard) society of Nigeria.

== History ==
The Dan originally came from the western Sudan region to the north, part of present-day Mali and Guinea. The location and movements of the Dan, Mano and We can be reconstructed from as early as the 8th century, at which time the Dan and Mano were located in the savanna region of the northern Ivory Coast. In the tenth century, political turmoil, population growth and land depletion caused the Dan to migrate south of the Nimba range and into the high forests.

The Dan had a reputation as a fierce warrior society. One notable warrior chief was Grougbay Zobaneeay, who fought and pushed the tribes that once live in the present day Nimba County to as far as Loguatuo in Ivory Coast. Kipko Toh'ah-Gbeu drove the Kru men from what is now called Tapitah, Nimba County (prior to the arrival of Chief Tapeh); his last major war with the settlers was in Sanniquellie. He retired when he was wounded in the Sanniquellie war. Kipho gave his daughter Lhe'kpahseu in marriage to Grougbay Zobaneeay.

Bho'Yaah, who lived in today's Garplay, Nimba County- in an alliance with Kipho Toh'Gbeu, made a truce to quit fighting the settlers. He was one of the last chief warriors of the Dan to have resisted the Americo-Liberian military push into Nimba. Gonsahn Ghe'Gbeu was from Miampleu Yeezleu, Nimba County. He also drove the Kphelehs from Eastern Liberia.

After Liberia became a nation in 1847, the new government in Monrovia began pacifying the Dan people. By the early 1900s, peace had been achieved, and administrative controls had been established.

== Economy ==
The Dan are primarily a farming people who annually clear forest land to grow their staple foods and cash crops, such as rice, cassava, sweet potatoes, and a variety of maize. Today, they also grow cocoa, coffee, and rubber. Women are given a small plot of ground on which to grow their own vegetables to use in the households or to sell in the market. Greens are gathered from domestic and wild plants in the forest. Palm oil is extracted from the many wild palm oil trees and then used for such things as fuel and cooking.

Dan men do most of the agricultural work, but women help with the harvesting and weeding. Men also do all of the hunting and most of the fishing, while women tend to such domestic duties as caring for the children and preparing the meals. Children help by chasing cattle, or wild animals and birds away from the crops. The Dan also raise livestock such as cattle, cow, sheep, and goats, fowls, and chicken. Some of these animals (white ones) are eaten only on special ritual occasions involving much feasting, or to perform sacrifices for the forgiveness of sin.

== Culture ==
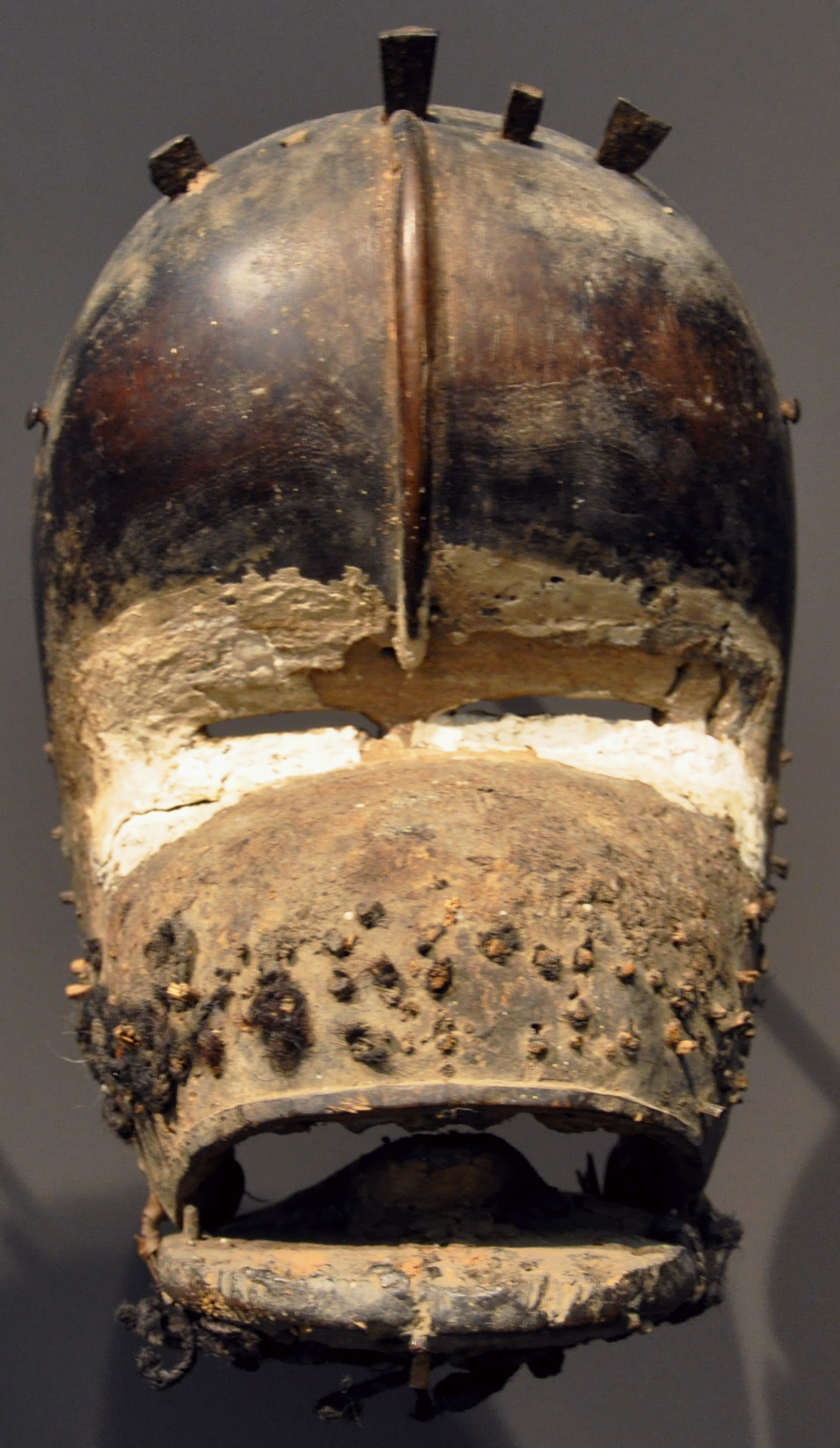
Chimpanzee mask

The basic unit of Dan culture is the family. Dan culture is patrilineal and polygamous, so this unit comprises a husband, one or more wives and their children. Lineages, or groups of people descended from a common ancestor in the paternal line, live in distinct sections of the town, which are called quarters in Liberian English. Towns group together under a central government are called clans.

=== Art ===
Dan arts are notable for wood sculpture, including a huge variety of masks, each with unique forms and purposes. Dan masks are the most important art form of the Dan people. Artisan also produce traditional wooden spoons.

=== Men's societies ===
Dan men have their own fraternal societies, which marks their initiation into manhood and guides them throughout their lives. Men's societies, curator Barbara Johnson writes, "form the real socio-political unit of power in the Dan community today, as they did in the past." These societies controlled by the elders and acts as a source of power for the community. Boys initiated into the society are prepared to encounter the mysteries of the spirit world and to learn the rules of adult Dan men. Women, too, have a similar society.

These societies demonstrate their power and effectiveness through masquerades, wherein they call upon and control tutelary spirits from the bush, who appear as masked figures in this context. Using these mask-spirits, the societies are able to settle disputes, enforce rules, and correct behavior. All males attend bon, or bush school, during their initiation into these societies when they are adolescents.

==== Gor society ====
Like many Mande cultures, societal organisation centers around "societies": either age group, caste, occupational, or geographic. In the recent historic period, Dan communities were for the first (known) time allied into a political organization, created through the Leopard society (Gor). The Gor spirit of the society focuses on peacemaking between communities which have often been in conflict around the powerful spirit Gor, who is responsible for peacemaking.

Individual villages, even those unified under the Leopard society, still maintain a high degree of political independence.

Dan villages are divided into quarters, each housing an extended family or lineage. Each quarter is headed by a "quarter chief", who is chosen either for being the oldest male in the family or for having the most aggressive personality. Although the village or town chief administers authority over the whole village, the real power comes from the council of elders who assist the chief in all decisions. Honorary chief titles can be given to non-tribe members who have assisted the tribe in charitable means. For example, U.S. Diplomat, John F. Moss (working for VOA), was bestowed by a Dan tribe in Liberia as an honorary chief after he commissioned a bulldozer to help them build a road through the jungle.

=== Religion ===
The Dan have a complex traditional religion. The Dan believe in Zlan, a Supreme God who created the universe and everything in it. They believe that no one can reach him or see him physically. Instead, they worship Zu, an independent power which they also consider the Holy Spirit of the Supreme God (Zlan). The majority of the people believe in reincarnation, through which Zu can enable a person to pass into another person or even an animal after death. The Dan believe that Zu is present in all aspects of the universe and is appealed to for many kinds of help. Zu is harnessed through masquerade or divination practices; the Dan harness zu by creating an object for zu to embody. Dreaming is the means through which people communicate with Zu.

=== Architecture ===
Traditional Dan huts were small, single-room dwellings made of mud and thatch. Each wife of a man had her own hut where her children lived until they were old enough to move out. Today, houses are large and rectangular with several rooms. A lot of changes have been made to the old traditions, but while some of the old traditions are still being practiced, it's only in indigent regions.
