= 2013–14 Indiana Hoosiers men's basketball team =

American college basketball season

2013–14 Indiana Hoosiers men's basketball
- Conference: Big Ten Conference
- Record: 17–15 (7–11 Big Ten)
- Head coach: Tom Crean (6th season)
- Assistant coaches: Tim Buckley (6th season); Steve McClain (4th season); Kenny Johnson (2nd season)
- Home arena: Assembly Hall

2013–14 Big Ten Conference men's basketball standings
| | Conf. | | | | Overall |
| Team | W | | L | PCT | W | | L | PCT |
|---|---|---|---|---|---|---|---|---|
| No. 7 Michigan | 15 | – | 3 | .833 | 28 | – | 9 | .757 |
| No. 12 Wisconsin | 12 | – | 6 | .667 | 30 | – | 8 | .789 |
| No. 11 Michigan State† | 12 | – | 6 | .667 | 29 | – | 9 | .763 |
| Nebraska | 11 | – | 7 | .611 | 19 | – | 13 | .594 |
| No. 22 Ohio State | 10 | – | 8 | .556 | 25 | – | 10 | .714 |
| Iowa | 9 | – | 9 | .500 | 20 | – | 13 | .606 |
| Minnesota | 8 | – | 10 | .444 | 25 | – | 13 | .658 |
| Illinois | 7 | – | 11 | .389 | 20 | – | 15 | .571 |
| Indiana | 7 | – | 11 | .389 | 17 | – | 15 | .531 |
| Penn State | 6 | – | 12 | .333 | 16 | – | 18 | .471 |
| Northwestern | 6 | – | 12 | .333 | 14 | – | 19 | .424 |
| Purdue | 5 | – | 13 | .278 | 15 | – | 17 | .469 |
† 2014 Big Ten tournament winner Rankings from AP poll

The 2013–14 Indiana Hoosiers men's basketball team represented Indiana University in the 2013–14 NCAA Division I men's basketball season. Their head coach was Tom Crean, in his sixth season with the Hoosiers. The team played its home games at Assembly Hall in Bloomington, Indiana, and was a member of the Big Ten Conference. They finished the season 17–15, 7–11 in Big Ten play to finish in a tie for eighth place. They lost in the first round of the Big Ten tournament to Illinois. After not being selected to play in the NIT, Indiana chose not to accept an invitation to the CBI claiming, "We're Indiana. We don't play in the CBI".

== Previous season ==
The Hoosiers finished the season with an overall record of 29–7, with a record of 14–4 in the Big Ten regular season for a first-place finish. Indiana started the preseason ranked #1 overall and spent a total of 10 weeks at #1. Indiana earned a 1 seed in the NCAA Tournament's East Region, where they lost in the Sweet Sixteen to Syracuse.

== Preseason ==
=== Departures ===
Indiana departures
| Name | Number | Pos. | Height | Weight | Year | Hometown | Reason for departure |
|---|---|---|---|---|---|---|---|
| Cody Zeller | 40 | C | 7'0" | 240 | Sophomore | Washington, Indiana | 2013 NBA draft |
| Victor Oladipo | 4 | SG | 6'5" | 214 | Junior | Upper Marlboro, Maryland | 2013 NBA draft |
| Jordan Hulls | 1 | PG/SG | 6'0" | 182 | Senior | Bloomington, Indiana | Graduated |
| Christian Watford | 2 | F | 6'9" | 232 | Senior | Birmingham, Alabama | Graduated |
| Derek Elston | 32 | F | 6'9" | 216 | Senior | Tipton, Indiana | Graduated |
| Maurice Creek | 3 | SG | 6'5" | 194 | Senior | Oxon Hill, Maryland | Graduate transfer (George Washington) |
| Remy Abell | 23 | PG/SG | 6'4" | 201 | Sophomore | Louisville, Kentucky | Transfer (Xavier) |

=== Recruiting class ===
In addition to the six incoming freshmen recruits, Indiana also added Evan Gordon, a graduate transfer from Arizona State.

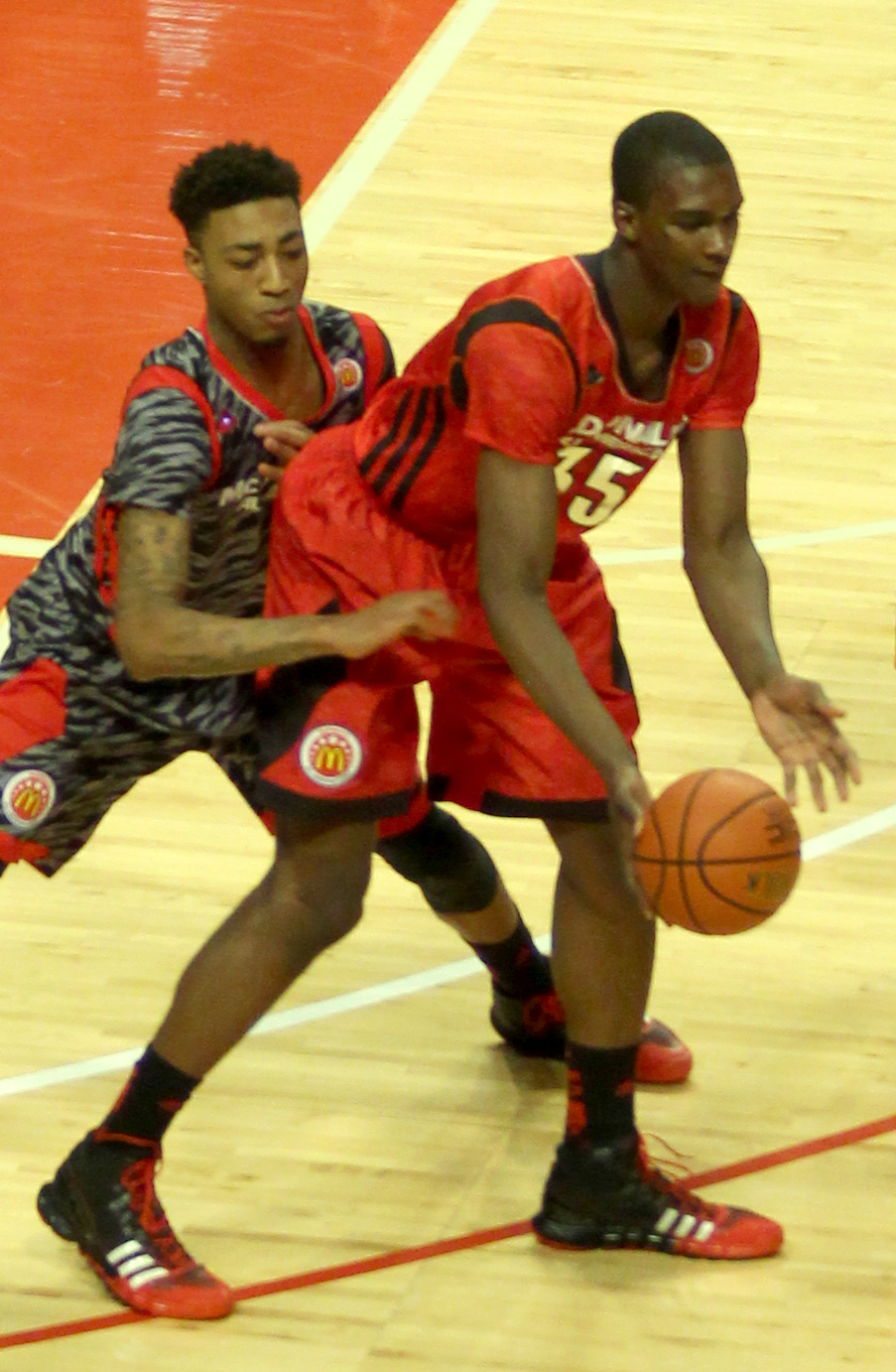
Noah Vonleh guarded by James Young in the 2013 McDonald's All-American Boys Game

College recruiting
| Name | Hometown | School | Height | Weight | Commit date |
|---|---|---|---|---|---|
| Noah Vonleh; F | Haverhill, MA | New Hampton Prep | 6 ft 9 in (2.06 m) | 222 lb (101 kg) | Nov 10, 2012 |
| Noah Vonleh; F | Recruit ratings: Scout: Rivals: 247Sports: (93) | | | | |
| Troy Williams; F | Hampton, VA | Oak Hill Academy | 6 ft 7 in (2.01 m) | 190 lb (86 kg) | Oct 28, 2012 |
| Troy Williams; F | Recruit ratings: Scout: Rivals: 247Sports: (87) | | | | |
| Luke Fischer; C | Germantown, WI | Germantown | 6 ft 10 in (2.08 m) | 215 lb (98 kg) | Jan 1, 2012 |
| Luke Fischer; C | Recruit ratings: Scout: Rivals: 247Sports: (89) | | | | |
| Stanford Robinson; G | Fairfax, VA | Findlay Prep | 6 ft 4 in (1.93 m) | 185 lb (84 kg) | May 16, 2012 |
| Stanford Robinson; G | Recruit ratings: Scout: Rivals: 247Sports: (82) | | | | |
| Devin Davis; F | Indianapolis, IN | Warren Central | 6 ft 6 in (1.98 m) | 195 lb (88 kg) | Nov 21, 2010 |
| Devin Davis; F | Recruit ratings: Scout: Rivals: 247Sports: (75) | | | | |
| Collin Hartman; G/F | Indianapolis, IN | Cathedral | 6 ft 6 in (1.98 m) | 185 lb (84 kg) | Nov 21, 2010 |
| Collin Hartman; G/F | Recruit ratings: Scout: Rivals: 247Sports: (74) | | | | |
Overall recruit ranking: Scout: 6 Rivals: 6 247Sports: 6 ESPN: 4
Note: In many cases, Scout, Rivals, 247Sports, On3, and ESPN may conflict in their listings of height and weight.; In these cases, the average was taken. ESPN grades are on a 100-point scale.; Sources: "Indiana Commit List for 2013". Rivals.; "ESPN". ESPN.; "2013 Team Ranking". Rivals.

== Roster ==
2013–14 Indiana Hoosiers men's basketball team
Players
Coaches

| Pos. | # | Name | Height | Weight | Year | Previous school | Hometown |
|---|---|---|---|---|---|---|---|
| F | 0 | Will Sheehey (C) | 6 ft 7 in (2.01 m) | 200 lb (91 kg) | Sr | Sagemont School | Stuart, Florida |
| F | 1 | Noah Vonleh | 6 ft 10 in (2.08 m) | 240 lb (109 kg) | Fr | New Hampton School | Haverhill, Massachusetts |
| G | 2 | Andrew Calomeris (W) | 6 ft 4 in (1.93 m) | 186 lb (84 kg) | Fr | Good Counsel High School | Potomac, Maryland |
| G | 3 | Jonny Marlin (W) | 5 ft 10 in (1.78 m) | 162 lb (73 kg) | RS So | Center Grove HS / IPFW | Greenwood, Indiana |
| F | 5 | Troy Williams | 6 ft 7 in (2.01 m) | 206 lb (93 kg) | Fr | Oak Hill Academy | Hampton, Virginia |
| G | 10 | Evan Gordon | 6 ft 0 in (1.83 m) | 192 lb (87 kg) | RS Sr | Hargrave Military Academy / Arizona State | Indianapolis, Indiana |
| G | 11 | Yogi Ferrell | 6 ft 0 in (1.83 m) | 178 lb (81 kg) | So | Park Tudor School | Indianapolis, Indiana |
| F | 12 | Hanner Mosquera-Perea | 6 ft 9 in (2.06 m) | 225 lb (102 kg) | So | La Lumiere School | Istmina, Colombia |
| F | 13 | Austin Etherington | 6 ft 6 in (1.98 m) | 213 lb (97 kg) | RS So | Hamilton Heights High School | Cicero, Indiana |
| F | 15 | Devin Davis | 6 ft 7 in (2.01 m) | 221 lb (100 kg) | Fr | Warren Central High School | Indianapolis, Indiana |
| G | 20 | Taylor Wayer (W) | 5 ft 10 in (1.78 m) | 187 lb (85 kg) | Sr | Bishop Chatard High School | Indianapolis, Indiana |
| G | 21 | Joe Fagan (W) | 6 ft 4 in (1.93 m) | 195 lb (88 kg) | Fr | Bishop Chatard High School | Indianapolis, Indiana |
| G | 22 | Stanford Robinson | 6 ft 4 in (1.93 m) | 193 lb (88 kg) | Fr | Findlay Prep | Fairfax, Virginia |
| F | 24 | Jeff Howard (W) | 6 ft 8 in (2.03 m) | 225 lb (102 kg) | Sr | Westfield High School | Westfield, Indiana |
| G | 30 | Collin Hartman | 6 ft 6 in (1.98 m) | 210 lb (95 kg) | Fr | Cathedral High School | Indianapolis, Indiana |
| F | 33 | Jeremy Hollowell | 6 ft 8 in (2.03 m) | 219 lb (99 kg) | So | Lawrence Central High School | Indianapolis, Indiana |
| C | 42 | Peter Jurkin | 7 ft 0 in (2.13 m) | 230 lb (104 kg) | So | United Faith Christian Academy | Juba, South Sudan |

Head coach

- Tom Crean

Assistant coach(es)

- Tim Buckley
- Steve McClain
- Kenny Johnson

Legend

- (C) Team captain
- (S) Suspended
- (I) Ineligible
- (W) Walk-on
- Injured
- Current redshirt

Roster
Last update: 2014-01-12

== Schedule ==
| Date time, TV | Opponent | Result | Record | High points | High rebounds | High assists | Site (attendance) city, state |
Exhibition
| Oct 26*; 7:00 pm | Southern Indiana | W 83–68 | – | 20 – Ferrell | 12 – Vonleh | 3 – Gordon | Assembly Hall (17,472); Bloomington, IN |
| Nov 4*; 7:00 pm | Hillsdale | W 79–39 | – | 14 – Ferrell | 9 – Vonleh | 3 – Tied | Assembly Hall (17,095); Bloomington, IN |
Non-conference regular season
| Nov 8*; 7:00 pm | Chicago State | W 100–72 | 1–0 | 16 – Hollowell | 14 – Vonleh | 3 – Ferrell | Assembly Hall (17,472); Bloomington, IN |
| Nov 12*; 6:00 pm, BTN | LIU-Brooklyn; 2K Sports Classic | W 73–72 | 2–0 | 19 – Sheehey | 11 – Vonleh | 6 – Sheehey | Assembly Hall (17,096); Bloomington, IN |
| Nov 15*; 7:00 pm, BTN | Samford | W 105–59 | 3–0 | 26 – Ferrell | 10 – Vonleh | 6 – Ferrell | Assembly Hall (17,472); Bloomington, IN |
| Nov 17*; 5:00 pm, BTN | Stony Brook; 2K Sports Classic | W 90–74 | 4–0 | 24 – Ferrell | 15 – Vonleh | 6 – Ferrell | Assembly Hall (17,472); Bloomington, IN |
| Nov 21*; 9:00 pm, ESPN2 | vs. Washington; 2K Sports Classic Semifinals | W 102–84 | 5–0 | 22 – Williams | 9 – Vonleh | 7 – Ferrell | Madison Square Garden (10,064); New York City, NY |
| Nov 22*; 7:00 pm, ESPN2 | vs. No. 18 UConn; 2K Sports Classic Championship | L 58–59 | 5–1 | 19 – Ferrell | 7 – Davis | 3 – Sheehey | Madison Square Garden (10,051); New York City, NY |
| Nov 26*; 8:00 pm, BTN | Evansville | W 77–46 | 6–1 | 18 – Hollowell | 12 – Vonleh | 3 – Sheehey | Assembly Hall (16,255); Bloomington, IN |
| Dec 3*; 7:15 pm, ESPN | at No. 4 Syracuse; ACC-Big Ten Challenge | L 52–69 | 6–2 | 17 – Vonleh | 6 – Vonleh | 2 – Tied | Carrier Dome (26,414); Syracuse, NY |
| Dec 7*; 7:30 pm, BTN | North Florida | W 89–68 | 7–2 | 15 – Gordon | 11 – Vonleh | 7 – Ferrell | Assembly Hall (17,472); Bloomington, IN |
| Dec 10*; 7:00 pm, ESPN2 | Oakland | W 81–54 | 8–2 | 26 – Gordon | 10 – Vonleh | 4 – Hollowell | Assembly Hall (17,472); Bloomington, IN |
| Dec 14*; 3:15 pm, ESPN | vs. Notre Dame; Crossroads Classic | L 72–79 | 8–3 | 22 – Sheehey | 5 – Vonleh | 4 – Tied | Bankers Life Fieldhouse (18,165); Indianapolis, IN |
| Dec 20*; 7:00 pm, BTN | Nicholls State | W 79–66 | 9–3 | 16 – Ferrell | 9 – Vonleh | 8 – Ferrell | Assembly Hall (16,646); Bloomington, IN |
| Dec 22*; 12:00 pm, BTN | Kennesaw State | W 90–66 | 10–3 | 25 – Ferrell | 9 – Vonleh | 5 – Ferrell | Assembly Hall (17,472); Bloomington, IN |
Big Ten regular season
| Dec 31; 3:00 pm, ESPN2 | at Illinois; Rivalry | L 80–83 ^{OT} | 10–4 (0–1) | 30 – Ferrell | 9 – Vonleh | 4 – Ferrell | State Farm Center (16,618); Champaign, IL |
| Jan 4; 2:00 pm, CBS | No. 5 Michigan State | L 56–73 | 10–5 (0–2) | 17 – Ferrell | 9 – Vonleh | 2 – 3 tied | Assembly Hall (17,472); Bloomington, IN |
| Jan 11; 12:00 pm, BTN | at Penn State | W 79–76 | 11–5 (1–2) | 19 – Vonleh | 6 – Vonleh | 7 – Ferrell | Bryce Jordan Center (8,079); University Park, PA |
| Jan 14; 7:00 pm, ESPN | No. 3 Wisconsin | W 75–72 | 12–5 (2–2) | 25 – Ferrell | 6 – Sheehey | 6 – Gordon | Assembly Hall (17,472); Bloomington, IN |
| Jan 18; 2:30 pm, BTN | Northwestern | L 47–54 | 12–6 (2–3) | 17 – Vonleh | 12 – Vonleh | 1 – 6 tied | Assembly Hall (17,472); Bloomington, IN |
| Jan 21; 7:00 pm, ESPN | at No. 3 Michigan State | L 66–71 | 12–7 (2–4) | 19 – Ferrell | 13 – Vonleh | 3 – Ferrell | Breslin Center (14,797); East Lansing, MI |
| Jan 26; 3:00 pm, BTN | Illinois; Rivalry | W 56–46 | 13–7 (3–4) | 17 – Ferrell | 14 – Vonleh | 5 – Ferrell | Assembly Hall (17,472); Bloomington, IN |
| Jan 30; 8:15 pm, BTN | at Nebraska | L 55–60 | 13–8 (3–5) | 14 – Ferrell | 9 – Williams | 5 – Ferrell | Pinnacle Bank Arena (15,333); Lincoln, NE |
| Feb 2; 1:00 pm, CBS | No. 10 Michigan | W 63–52 | 14–8 (4–5) | 27 – Ferrell | 12 – Vonleh | 3 – Sheehey | Assembly Hall (17,472); Bloomington, IN |
| Feb 8; 8:15 pm, BTN | at Minnesota | L 60–66 | 14–9 (4–6) | 14 – Ferrell | 12 – Vonleh | 4 – Ferrell | Williams Arena (14,625); Minneapolis, IN |
| Feb 12; 7:00 pm, BTN | Penn State | L 65–66 | 14–10 (4–7) | 16 – Ferrell | 12 – Vonleh | 6 – Ferrell | Assembly Hall (17,472); Bloomington, IN |
| Feb 15; 4:00 pm, ESPN | at Purdue; Rivalry/Indiana National Guard Governor's Cup | L 64–82 | 14–11 (4–8) | 27 – Ferrell | 6 – Vonleh | 2 – Tied | Mackey Arena (14,846); West Lafayette, IN |
| Feb 22; 8:15 pm, BTN | at Northwestern | W 61–56 | 15–11 (5–8) | 12 – 4 tied | 8 – Vonleh | 2 – 4 tied | Welsh-Ryan Arena (8,117); Evanston, IL |
| Feb 25; 9:00 pm, ESPN | at No. 14 Wisconsin | L 58–69 | 15–12 (5–9) | 24 – Ferrell | 6 – Vonleh | 2 – Williams | Kohl Center (17,249); Madison, WI |
| Feb 27; 9:00 pm, ESPN | No. 20 Iowa^ | W 93–86 | 16–12 (6–9) | 30 – Sheehey | 5 – Vonleh | 4 – Ferrell | Assembly Hall (17,472); Bloomington, IN |
| Mar 2; 4:00 pm, CBS | No. 22 Ohio State | W 72–64 | 17–12 (7–9) | 20 – Ferrell | 6 – Tied | 4 – Ferrell | Assembly Hall (17,472); Bloomington, IN |
| Mar 5; 7:00 pm, BTN | Nebraska | L 60–70 | 17–13 (7–10) | 18 – Williams | 8 – Ferrell | 5 – Ferrell | Assembly Hall (17,472); Bloomington, IN |
| Mar 8; 6:00 pm, ESPN | at No. 12 Michigan | L 80–84 | 17–14 (7–11) | 17 – Sheehey | 8 – Vonleh | 8 – Ferrell | Crisler Arena (12,707); Ann Arbor, MI |
Big Ten tournament
| Mar 13; 12:00 pm, BTN | vs. Illinois; First Round | L 54–64 | 17–15 | 14 – Ferrell | 6 – Hollowell | 5 – Sheehey | Bankers Life Fieldhouse (18,596); Indianapolis, IN |
*Non-conference game. ^{#}Rankings from AP Poll. (#) Tournament seedings in parentheses. All times are in Eastern Time.

^ This game was originally scheduled for Feb 18, but was postponed due to safety concerns following a piece of metal falling from the roof at Assembly Hall.

- Source: Schedule

== Rankings ==
Ranking movements Legend: ██ Increase in ranking ██ Decrease in ranking — = Not ranked RV = Received votes
| | Week | | | | | | | | | | | | | | | | | | | | |
| Poll | Pre | 2 | 3 | 4 | 5 | 6 | 7 | 8 | 9 | 10 | 11 | 12 | 13 | 14 | 15 | 16 | 17 | 18 | 19 | 20 | Final |
|---|---|---|---|---|---|---|---|---|---|---|---|---|---|---|---|---|---|---|---|---|---|
| AP | RV | RV | RV | RV | RV | RV | — | — | — | — | — | — | — | — | — | — | — | — | — | — | N/A |
| Coaches | 24 | 23 | 22 | 25 | 23 | RV | — | — | — | — | — | — | — | — | — | — | — | — | — | — | — |

== See also ==
- 2013–14 Indiana Hoosiers women's basketball team
