= Devin Davis (basketball, born 1995) =

American basketball player

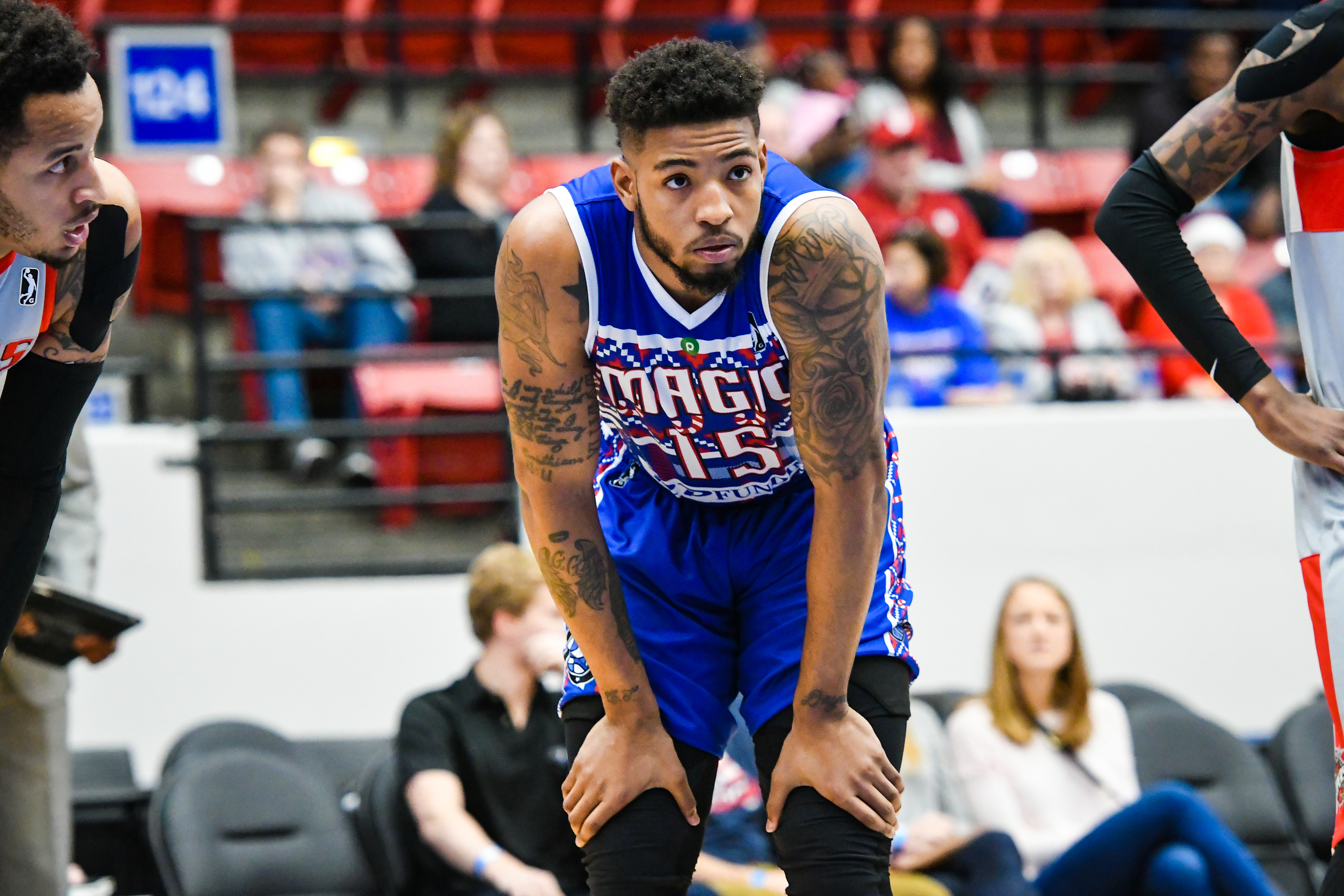
- Davis in action with Lakeland Magic in 2018

Koroivos Amaliadas
- Position: Power forward / center
- League: Greek A2 Elite League

Personal information
- Born: March 29, 1995 (age 31) Indianapolis, Indiana, U.S.
- Listed height: 6 ft 7 in (2.01 m)
- Listed weight: 221 lb (100 kg)

Career information
- High school: Warren Central (Indianapolis, Indiana)
- College: Indiana (2013–2015); Odessa College (2015–2016); Houston (2016–2018)
- NBA draft: 2018: undrafted
- Playing career: 2018–present

Career history
- 2018–2019: Lakeland Magic
- 2019–2021: Lavrio
- 2021–2022: ESSM Le Portel
- 2022: Peristeri
- 2022–2023: Napoli
- 2023: Scaligera Verona
- 2023–2024: Astana
- 2024–2025: Panionios
- 2025: Hangtuah Jakarta
- 2025: Astros de Jalisco
- 2026–present: Koroivos Amaliadas

Career highlights
- First-team NJCAA All-American (2016)
- Stats at Basketball Reference

Devin Davis (born March 29, 1995) is an American professional basketball player for Koroivos Amaliadas of the Greek A2 Elite League. He played college basketball for Indiana, Odessa College and Houston.

== High school career ==
Davis attended Warren Central High School in Indianapolis, Indiana.

== College career ==
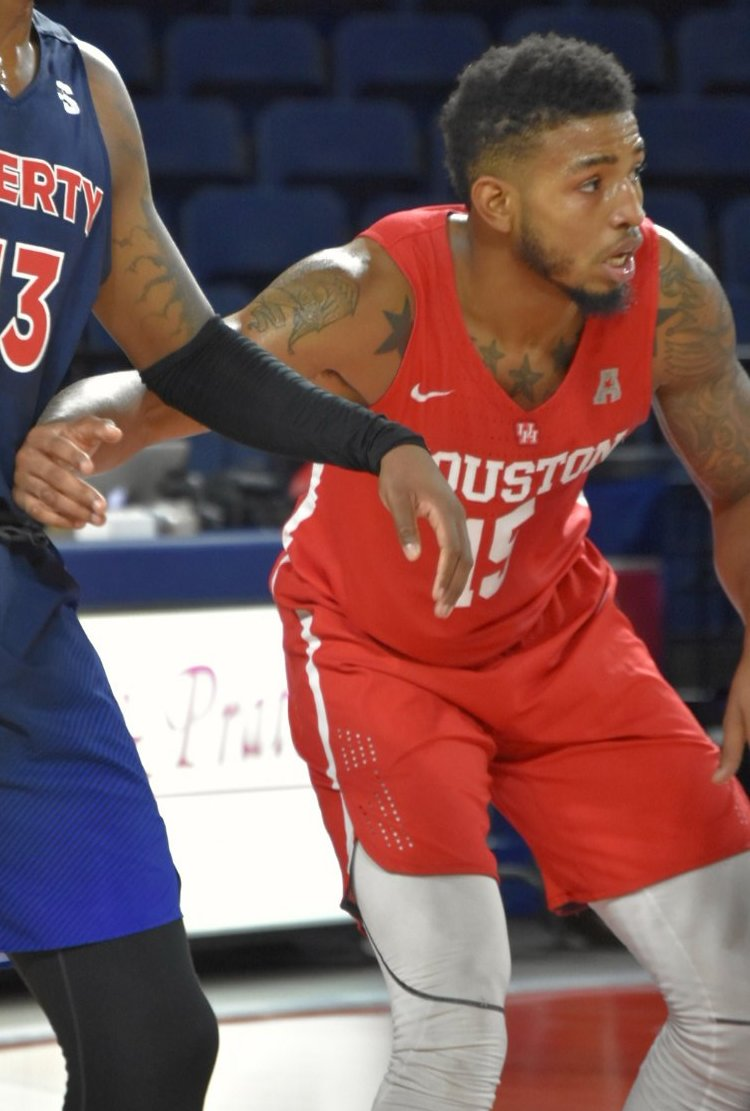
Davis in action with Houston

Davis began his collegiate career at Indiana. He was involved in a serious car accident that left him hospitalized in November 2014. In May 2015, he was dismissed from Indiana after being cited for possession of marijuana. Davis transferred to Odessa College in Texas. He earned junior college All-American honors while averaging 16.8 points and 8.2 rebounds per game. Davis transferred to Houston, choosing the Cougars over offers from Iowa State, Temple, Cincinnati, Purdue and Ole Miss. He averaged 8.3 points and 5.3 rebounds per game as a junior but struggled with injuries. As a senior, Davis averaged 10.9 points and 6.3 rebounds per game.

== Professional career ==
=== Lakeland Magic (2018–2019) ===
After going undrafted in the 2018 NBA draft, Davis joined the Lakeland Magic of the NBA G League.

=== Lavrio (2019–2021) ===
In August 2019, Davis joined Lavrio of the Greek Basket League. On August 3, 2020, he renewed his contract with the Greek club. During the very successful for the club 2020–21 season, where they reached the Greek Basket League finals for the first time, Davis averaged 10.6 points, 5 rebounds, 0.8 assists, 1.1 steals, and 0.6 blocks, shooting with 49% from beyond the arc, in 33 domestic Greek league games, while playing 23.5 minutes per contest.

=== ESSM Le Portel (2021–2022) ===
On July 13, 2021, Davis officially signed with French LNB Pro A club ESSM Le Portel. In 33 domestic French league games, he averaged 12.3 points and 5.6 rebounds, while playing around 27 minutes per contest.

=== Peristeri Athens (2022) ===
On June 27, 2022, Davis returned to Greece, signing with FIBA Champions League club Peristeri Athens. On November 10 of the same year, he mutually parted ways with the team. In 5 domestic Greek league games, he averaged 7.4 points and 4.4 rebounds, while in 3 FIBA BCL matches, he posted an average of 9 points and 3 rebounds per contest.

=== Napoli (2022–2023) ===
On November 15, 2022, Davis signed with Napoli of the Italian Lega Basket Serie A, in order to replace Greek player Dimitris Agravanis at the forward-center position. He made his debut on November 20, 2022, when he scored 13 points and grabbed 8 rebounds, in 22 minutes played, in a win against Universo Treviso.

=== Scagliera Verona (2023) ===
On February 10, 2023, Davis signed with Scagliera Verona of the Italian LBA.

=== Astana (2023–2024) ===
On August 4, 2023, he joined Astana.

=== Panionios (2024–present) ===
On July 20, 2024, Davis returned to Greece and joined Panionios.

== Career statistics ==
Legend
GP	Games played	GS	Games started	MPG	Minutes per game
FG%	Field goal percentage	3P%	3-point field goal percentage	FT%	Free throw percentage
RPG	Rebounds per game	APG	Assists per game	SPG	Steals per game
BPG	Blocks per game	PPG	Points per game	**Bold**	Career high

=== College ===
Year	Team	GP	GS	MPG	FG%	3P%	FT%	RPG	APG	SPG	BPG	PPG
2013–14	Indiana	29	1	8.8	**.529**	.000	.667	2.6	0.0	.2	.4	2.4
2016–17	Houston	20	13	20.9	.458	**.250**	.571	3.5	1.0	**.7**	.5	8.3
2017–18	Houston	**35**	**35**	**26.0**	.488	.143	**.680**	**4.7**	**1.3**	**.7**	**.7**	**10.9**
Career		84	49	18.8	.484	.182	.644	4.7	0.8	0.5	.6	7.3
