= John Francis Moss (educational administrator) =

British clerk

John Francis Moss (1844–1907) was the first Clerk to the Sheffield School Board in the 30 years following the Elementary Education Act 1870 to create compulsory education in England and Wales for children aged between five and 13, and subsequently known as "The Father of Education in Sheffield".

== Early life ==
John Francis Moss was one of four brothers born to Richard and Elizabeth Moss in Rotherham in 1844. (England & Wales Births 1837–2006, 1851 Census).

His family lived first at Carr House, Greasbrough, on the north side of Rotherham (1851 Census). He and his brothers George, Charles Herbert and Benjamin Moss were educated at one of the earliest schools in Rotherham, the British School near Rawmarsh Road at a time when school education was not a universal right. By 1861 he had moved with his family to 28, Phoenix Place, Kimberworth (1861 Census).

== Career ==
John F. Moss first served an apprenticeship as a printer in Rotherham before later becoming chief reporter at the Sheffield Daily Telegraph which had been founded in 1855.

John F Moss left his career in journalism behind following the passing of the Elementary Education Act 1870 to become Clerk to the newly formed Sheffield Board of Schools.

In his submission to the Statistical Enquiry Committee he stated: In 1872 he registered the Sheffield School Desk Design.

After touring around Europe, observing educational practices in other countries he published "Notes on National Education in Continental Europe", 1873. Later on, in 1880, he published The Handbook of the New Code of Regulations, 1880, John P. Moss [sic].

He was Clerk to the School Board on the occasion of the opening of the new Firth College by Prince Leopold in 1880 a college to subsequently become part of the University of Sheffield.

On 28 November 1900, to mark the completion of thirty years work as Clerk to the School Board, he was presented with a portrait of himself, painted by Ernest Moore.

== Death ==
Mr. John F. Moss died in June 1907, when he was 62 years old, at his home on Edgebrook Road.
