= Max Montana =

American-German basketball player

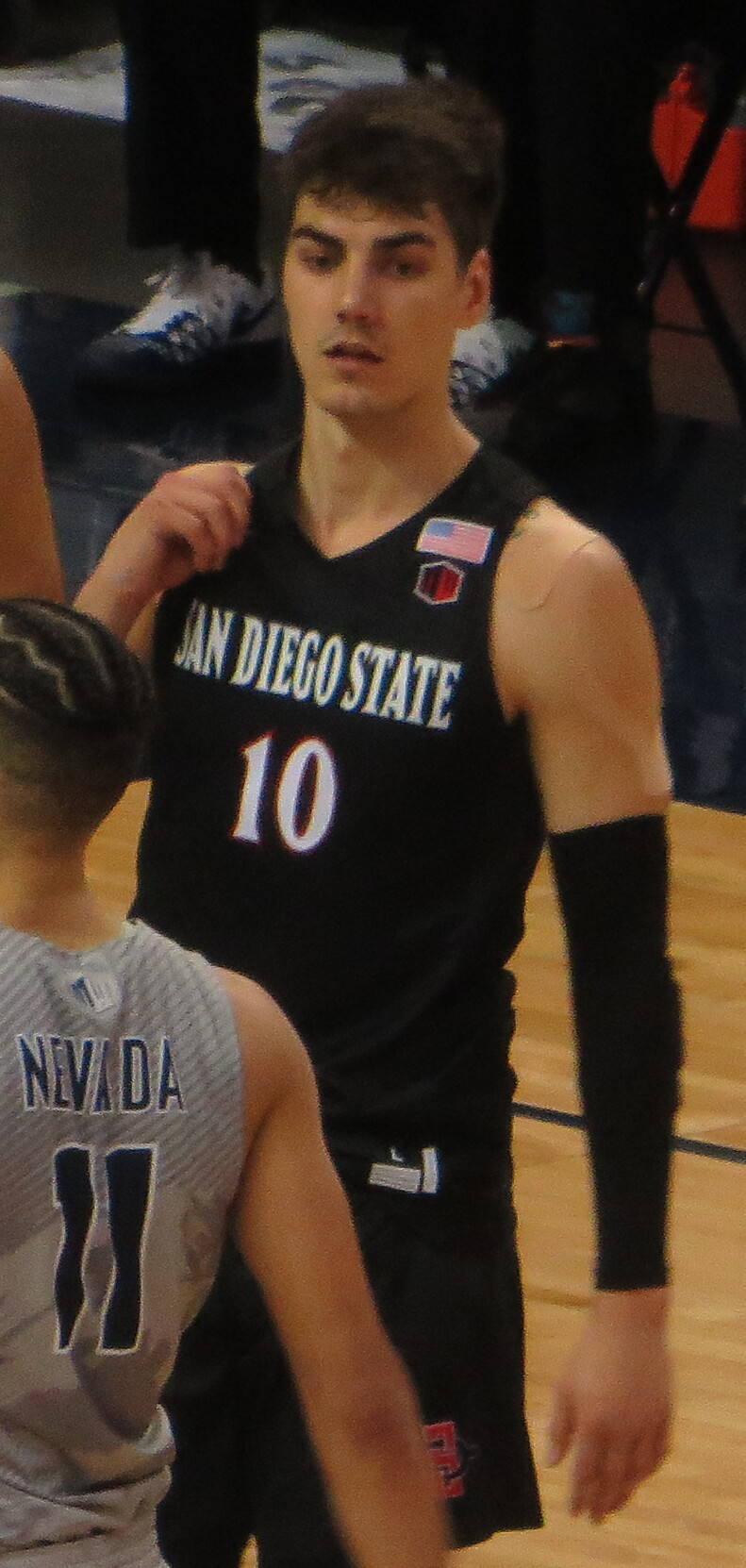

Personal information
- Born: January 11, 1996 (age 30)
- Listed height: 6 ft 9 in (2.06 m)
- Listed weight: 210 lb (95 kg)

Career information
- High school: Wilbraham & Monson (Wilbraham, Massachusetts)
- College: Indiana (2014–2015); San Diego State (2015–2018)
- Playing career: 2018–2021
- Position: Small forward

Career history
- 2018–2019: Giessen 46ers
- 2019: Hamburg Towers
- 2019–2020: Greensboro Swarm
- 2021: Keflavík

Career highlights
- ProA winner (2019)

Max Montana Hoetzel (born January 11, 1996) is an American and German former basketball player. He played college basketball for Indiana and San Diego State before playing professionally in Europe.

== High school career ==
Montana attended Wilbraham & Monson Academy where he averaged 16 points, 8 rebounds and 4 assists as a senior.

== College career ==
Montana started his college career with Indiana in 2014 where he averaged 2.4 points and 1.3 rebounds in 7.7 minutes per game during his freshman season. He transferred to San Diego State in 2015 and redshirted the 2015–2016 season. During the 2016–2017 season, he averaged 7.7 points and 3.8 rebounds per game. During his junior season he averaged 6.9 points in 26 games. He missed six games after hyperextending his knee in the second game of the season. In 2018, he decided to forgo his final year of eligibility and turn pro.

== Professional career ==
In 2018, Montana signed with Giessen 46ers in the Basketball Bundesliga. In February 2019, Montana switched to the Hamburg Towers where he went on to win the German second-tier Pro A.

In February 2021, Montana signed with Úrvalsdeild karla club Keflavík. On 16 March, the team terminated its contract with Montana for violations of the club's disciplinary rules. In 9 games, he averaged 9.0 points and connected on 35.5% of his three-point shots.

== National team career ==
Montana played for the German U-18 team in 2013.

== Personal life ==
Montana is born to a German father and a Danish mother.
