= Jack Moss =

Senior American diplomat (1928–2004)

- Moss at his retirement ceremony
- Born: John Francis Moss; March 7, 1928; Pacific Junction, Iowa, U.S.
- Died: January 16, 2004 (aged 75); Charlotte, North Carolina, U.S.
- Spouse: Becky Moss
- Children: 3
- Military career
- Allegiance: United States
- Branch: United States Army
- Known for: Voice of America station manager
- Other work: Senior Foreign Service Officer; broadcasting executive

John Francis Moss (March 7, 1928 – January 16, 2004) was an American foreign service officer and broadcasting executive. He was a career member of the United States Senior Foreign Service with the United States Information Agency (USIA). He served overseas and was later identified as the station manager of the Voice of America's transmitting facilities near Greenville, North Carolina.

== Early life and military service ==
Moss was born on March 7, 1928, in Pacific Junction, Iowa, to Francis V. Moss and Artie Mae Strauser Moss. He served in the United States Army and later became a Senior Foreign Service Officer for the U.S. government.

== Career ==
Jack Moss working for Philco at Naval Station Argentia, 1952.

=== Voice of America ===
In 1961, IRE Transactions on Broadcasting reported that the Greenville facility, then under construction at a cost of nearly $24 million, was expected to become the world's most powerful shortwave broadcasting station, with six 500-kilowatt, six 250-kilowatt, and six 50-kilowatt transmitters.

During the Cold War, Electronics described Greenville as the world's largest transmitting facility in 1963 and reported a combined transmitting power of 4.82 million watts. The installation comprised two transmitting sites and a receiving site across approximately 6,000 acres.

In 1989, Radio World described the station's high-power transmitting equipment and identified Moss as its station manager. The article included a photograph of Moss with an AEG Telefunken S4005 500-kilowatt transmitter.

=== United States Information Agency ===
The U.S. Department of State's Foreign Service List identifies John F. Moss as a USIA employee assigned to the U.S. mission in Monrovia, Liberia, as deputy relay station manager in July 1972.

In 1985, the Congressional Record listed Moss under the United States Information Agency (USIA).

== Personal life ==
Moss married Rebecca "Becky" Youden in March 1953 and they had three children, Sheila Nichols, John Moss, and David Moss. His daughter Sheila and grandson Josh Nichols had died before him. He died at his home in Charlotte, North Carolina, on January 16, 2004, at the age of 75.
