= Noah Vonleh =

American basketball player (born 1995)

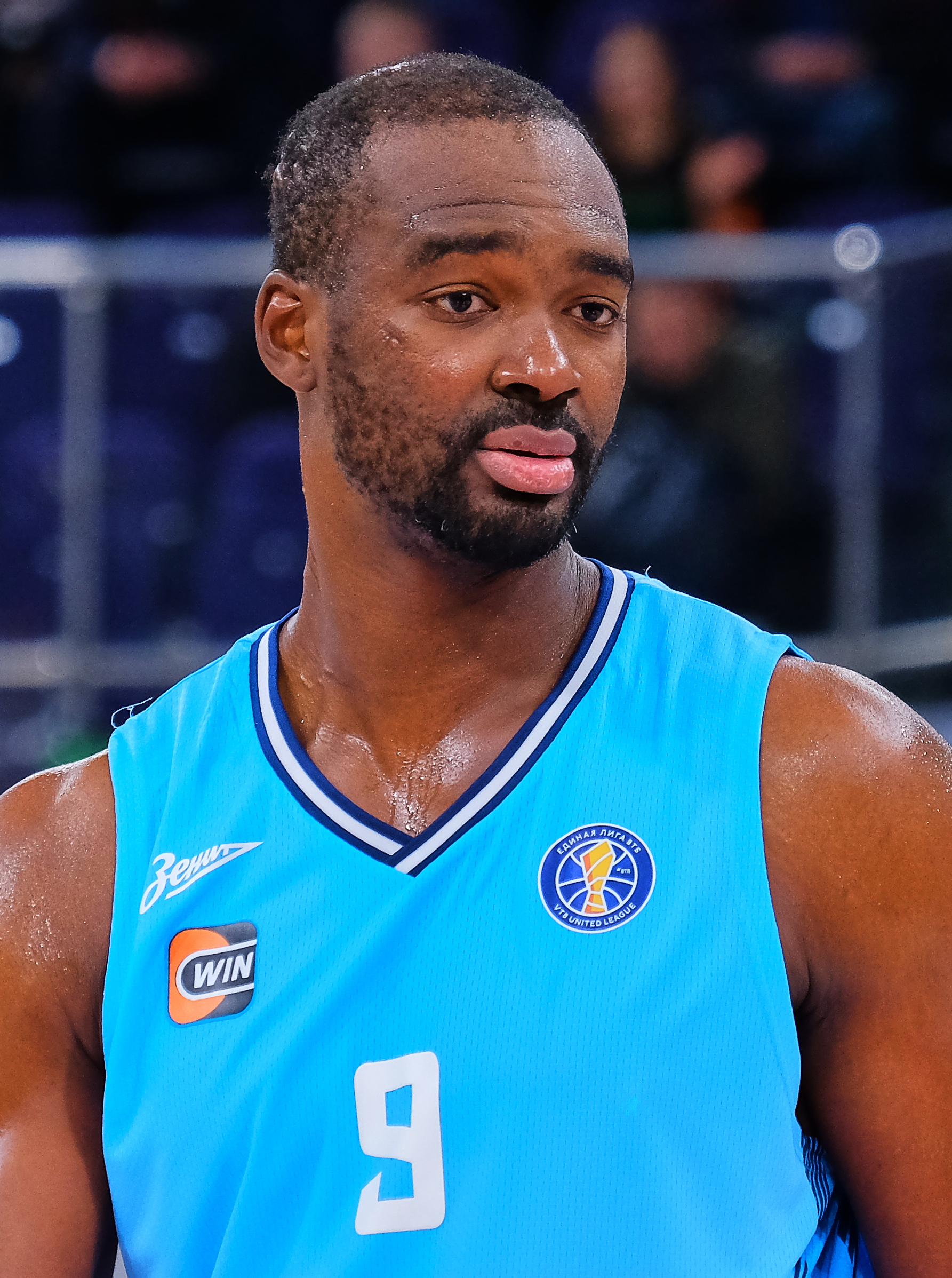
- Vonleh with Zenit Saint Petersburg in 2025

Free agent
- Position: Power forward / center

Personal information
- Born: August 24, 1995 (age 31) Salem, Massachusetts, U.S.
- Listed height: 6 ft 10 in (2.08 m)
- Listed weight: 257 lb (117 kg)

Career information
- High school: Haverhill (Haverhill, Massachusetts); New Hampton School (New Hampton, New Hampshire)
- College: Indiana (2013–2014)
- NBA draft: 2014: 1st round, 9th overall pick
- Drafted by: Charlotte Hornets
- Playing career: 2014–present

Career history
- 2014–2015: Charlotte Hornets
- 2014: →Fort Wayne Mad Ants
- 2015–2018: Portland Trail Blazers
- 2018: Chicago Bulls
- 2018–2019: New York Knicks
- 2019–2020: Minnesota Timberwolves
- 2020: Denver Nuggets
- 2021: Brooklyn Nets
- 2021–2022: Shanghai Sharks
- 2022–2023: Boston Celtics
- 2023–2024: Shanghai Sharks
- 2025: Zenit Saint Petersburg

Career highlights
- Third-team All-Big Ten (2014); Big Ten Freshman of the Year (2014); Big Ten All-Freshman Team (2014); McDonald's All-American (2013)
- Stats at NBA.com
- Stats at Basketball Reference

Noah Vonleh (/ˈvɒnleɪ/ VON-lay; born August 24, 1995) is an American professional basketball player who last played for Zenit Saint Petersburg of the VTB United League. He played college basketball for the Indiana Hoosiers.

== High school career ==
Vonleh attended Haverhill High School in Haverhill, Massachusetts, before transferring to New Hampton School in New Hampton, New Hampshire, in 2011. He reclassified and repeated his sophomore year at New Hampton. In 2011–12, Vonleh averaged 16 points and nine rebounds per game. Prior to the 2012–13 season, he reclassified back to the class of 2013. As a senior, he averaged 17 points, 12 rebounds and four assists per game, going on to earn McDonald's All-American honors.

On November 10, 2012, Vonleh signed a letter of intent to play for Indiana University, turning down offers from Kansas, North Carolina, UCLA, and Ohio State, among others. Upon committing to Indiana he said, "Their academics are good, they're the No. 1 team in the country and they've got another great class coming in next year."

College recruiting
Name	Hometown	School	Height	Weight	Commit date
Noah Vonleh; PF	Haverhill, Massachusetts	New Hampton School	6 ft 9 in (2.06 m)	235 lb (107 kg)	Nov 10, 2012
Noah Vonleh; PF	Recruit ratings: Scout: Rivals: 247Sports: ESPN:				
Overall recruit ranking:
Note: In many cases, Scout, Rivals, 247Sports, On3, and ESPN may conflict in their listings of height and weight.; In these cases, the average was taken. ESPN grades are on a 100-point scale.; Sources:

== College career ==
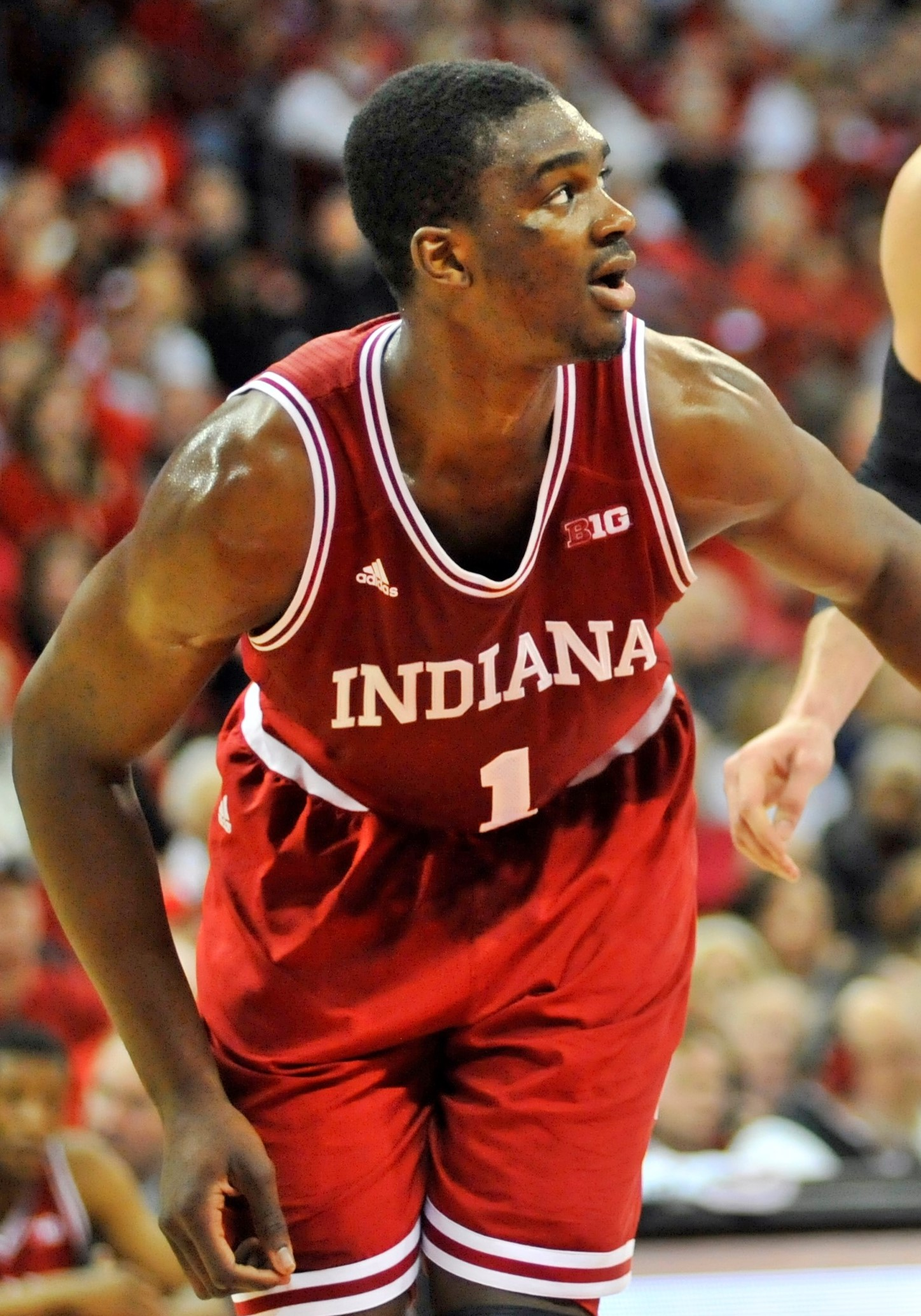
Vonleh with the Indiana Hoosiers in 2014

In his lone season at Indiana, Vonleh was named Big Ten Freshman of the Year and third-team All-Big Ten by the coaches and media. In 30 games (29 starts), he averaged 11.3 points, 9.0 rebounds and 1.4 blocks in 26.5 minutes per game.

On April 3, 2014, Vonleh declared for the NBA draft, forgoing his final three years of college eligibility.

== Professional career ==
=== Charlotte Hornets (2014–2015) ===
On June 26, 2014, Vonleh was selected with the ninth overall pick in the 2014 NBA draft by the Charlotte Hornets. On July 25, 2014, he signed with the Hornets. On September 2, 2014, he underwent successful surgery to repair a sports hernia and was ruled out for six to eight weeks. After making just four appearances for the Hornets to start the 2014–15 season, he was assigned to the Fort Wayne Mad Ants of the NBA Development League on December 28, 2014. He was recalled three days later. On April 12, 2015, he had a season-best game with 16 points and 12 rebounds against the Detroit Pistons. Three days later in Charlotte's season finale, Vonleh had another 12-rebound game against the Toronto Raptors.

=== Portland Trail Blazers (2015–2018) ===
On June 24, 2015, Vonleh was traded, along with Gerald Henderson, to the Portland Trail Blazers in exchange for Nicolas Batum. On November 15, 2015, he registered his first career start in a game against his former team, the Charlotte Hornets. In just under 24 minutes of action, he recorded nine points and six rebounds. On January 23, 2016, he scored a season-high 11 points against the Los Angeles Lakers. In late March, Vonleh was replaced in the starting lineup by Maurice Harkless.

In his 47 games prior to center Jusuf Nurkić joining the Trail Blazers in a trade in February 2017, Vonleh averaged just 3.3 points and 4.1 rebounds in 13 minutes per game. With Nurkić in the lineup, Vonleh began to thrive after the All-Star Break, averaging 6.7 points on 57.5% shooting and 7.2 rebounds in the final 26 games of the season. Vonleh recorded four double-doubles in that span, and netted his first game-winner as Portland topped the San Antonio Spurs at the buzzer on April 10. He had 11 double-digit rebounding performances during the season, with six coming in March and April, culminating in a career-high 19-rebound game against the New Orleans Pelicans in the regular season finale.

On November 20, 2017, Vonleh had a season-best game with 11 points and 18 rebounds in a 100–92 win over the Memphis Grizzlies.

=== Chicago Bulls (2018) ===
On February 8, 2018, Vonleh was traded, along with cash considerations, to the Chicago Bulls in exchange for the draft rights to Milovan Raković.

=== New York Knicks (2018–2019) ===
On July 24, 2018, Vonleh signed with the New York Knicks. On January 25, 2019, he had a career-high 22 points and 13 rebounds in a 109–99 loss to the Brooklyn Nets.

=== Minnesota Timberwolves (2019–2020) ===
On July 8, 2019, Vonleh signed with the Minnesota Timberwolves.

=== Denver Nuggets (2020) ===
On February 5, 2020, the Timberwolves traded Vonleh to the Denver Nuggets in a four-team trade.

On November 27, 2020, Vonleh signed with the Chicago Bulls. He was waived by the Bulls on December 14.

=== Brooklyn Nets (2021) ===
On February 8, 2021, Vonleh signed with the Brooklyn Nets. He played four games for the Nets before being waived.

=== Shanghai Sharks (2021–2022) ===
On September 18, 2021, Vonleh signed with the Shanghai Sharks of the Chinese Basketball Association.

=== Boston Celtics (2022–2023) ===
On August 2, 2022, Vonleh signed with his hometown team the Boston Celtics on a 1-year deal. On October 15, 2022, reports confirmed Vonleh secured a Celtics roster spot for the 2022 regular season. On January 5, 2023, Vonleh was traded to the San Antonio Spurs in exchange for draft consideration. The Spurs then waived Vonleh later that day.

=== Second stint with the Shanghai Sharks (2023–2024) ===
On August 17, 2023, Vonleh signed with the Shanghai Sharks.

=== Zenit Saint Petersburg (2025) ===
On November 20, 2025, Vonleh signed with the Zenit of the VTB United League.

== Career statistics ==
Legend
GP	Games played	GS	Games started	MPG	Minutes per game
FG%	Field goal percentage	3P%	3-point field goal percentage	FT%	Free throw percentage
RPG	Rebounds per game	APG	Assists per game	SPG	Steals per game
BPG	Blocks per game	PPG	Points per game	**Bold**	Career high

=== NBA ===
==== Regular season ====
Year	Team	GP	GS	MPG	FG%	3P%	FT%	RPG	APG	SPG	BPG	PPG
2014–15	Charlotte	25	0	10.4	.395	.385	.692	3.4	.2	.2	.4	3.3
2015–16	Portland	**78**	56	15.1	.421	.239	.745	3.9	.4	.3	.3	3.6
2016–17	Portland	74	41	17.1	.481	.350	.638	5.2	.4	.4	.4	4.4
2017–18	Portland	33	12	14.4	.490	.333	.742	5.1	.4	.2	.3	3.6
2017–18	Chicago	21	4	19.0	.413	.300	.481	6.9	1.0	.6	.3	6.9
2018–19	New York	68	**57**	**25.3**	.470	.336	.712	**7.8**	**1.9**	**.7**	**.8**	**8.4**
2019–20	Minnesota	29	1	12.0	.547	.143	.821	4.0	.9	.4	.2	4.1
2019–20	Denver	7	0	4.3	**.833**	**1.000**	.500	1.1	.3	.0	.0	1.9
2020–21	Brooklyn	4	0	2.8	.000	.000	—	.3	.3	.0	.0	.0
2022–23	Boston	23	1	7.4	.458	.250	**1.000**	2.1	.3	.1	.3	1.1
Career		362	172	16.2	.459	.307	.692	4.9	.7	.4	.4	4.7

==== Playoffs ====
Year	Team	GP	GS	MPG	FG%	3P%	FT%	RPG	APG	SPG	BPG	PPG
2016	Portland	**6**	0	2.0	.000	.000	.000	.7	.3	**.3**	.0	.0
2017	Portland	4	**2**	**25.0**	**.444**	.000	.000	**7.3**	**2.0**	**.3**	**1.0**	**4.5**
2020	Denver	1	0	3.0	.000	.000	.000	.0	.0	.0	.0	.0
Career		11	2	10.5	.364	.000	.400	3.0	.9	.3	.3	1.6

=== College ===
Year	Team	GP	GS	MPG	FG%	3P%	FT%	RPG	APG	SPG	BPG	PPG
2013–14	Indiana	30	29	26.5	.523	.485	.716	9.0	.6	.9	1.4	11.3

== Personal life ==
Vonleh is the son of Samuel Vonleh and Renell Kumeh, and has two siblings: Samnell Vonleh, and Aaronette Vonleh, a college basketball player currently at Baylor University. She previously played at the University of Arizona (2021-2022) and the University of Colorado Boulder (2022-2024). His paternal great-grandfather, Chief Blahsue Vonleh, was Paramount Chief of the Doe Clan, Nimba County, Liberia from 1920 until his death in 1947.
