= 2014–15 Wisconsin Badgers men's basketball team =

American college basketball season

2014–15 Wisconsin Badgers men's basketball

NCAA tournament, Runner-up Big Ten Regular Season Champions Big Ten tournament champions Battle 4 Atlantis Champions

National Championship Game, L 63–68 vs. Duke
- Conference: Big Ten Conference

Ranking
- Coaches: No. 2
- AP: No. 3
- Record: 36–4 (16–2 Big Ten)
- Head coach: Bo Ryan (14th season)
- Associate head coach: Greg Gard
- Assistant coaches: Gary Close; Lamont Paris
- Home arena: Kohl Center

2014–15 Big Ten Conference men's basketball standings
	Conf.				Overall
Team	W		L	PCT	W		L	PCT
No. 3 Wisconsin †	16	–	2	.889	36	–	4	.900
No. 12 Maryland	14	–	4	.778	28	–	7	.800
No. 23 Michigan State	12	–	6	.667	27	–	12	.692
Iowa	12	–	6	.667	22	–	12	.647
Purdue	12	–	6	.667	21	–	13	.618
Ohio State	11	–	7	.611	24	–	11	.686
Indiana	9	–	9	.500	20	–	14	.588
Illinois	9	–	9	.500	19	–	14	.576
Michigan	8	–	10	.444	16	–	16	.500
Minnesota	6	–	12	.333	18	–	15	.545
Northwestern	6	–	12	.333	15	–	17	.469
Nebraska	5	–	13	.278	13	–	18	.419
Penn State	4	–	14	.222	18	–	16	.529
Rutgers	2	–	16	.111	10	–	22	.313
† 2015 Big Ten tournament winner Rankings from AP poll

The 2014–15 Wisconsin Badgers men's basketball team represented the University of Wisconsin–Madison in the 2014–15 NCAA Division I men's basketball season. This was Bo Ryan's 14th and final full season as head coach at Wisconsin. The team played their home games at the Kohl Center in Madison, Wisconsin and were members of the Big Ten Conference.They finished the season 36–4, 16–2 in Big Ten play to win the Big Ten regular season championship. They defeated Michigan, Purdue, and Michigan State to win the Big Ten tournament and earn an automatic bid to the NCAA tournament. This marked the Badgers' 17th straight trip to the Tournament. In the Tournament, they defeated Coastal Carolina and Oregon to advance to their second straight Sweet Sixteen. They defeated North Carolina and Arizona to reach the school's fourth overall and second consecutive Final Four. By upsetting unbeaten Kentucky 71–64 in the Final Four in Indianapolis, the Badgers moved on to play Duke in the National Championship Game, going for their first title in 74 years. However, Wisconsin lost the game 68–63.

== Previous season ==
The Badgers finished the 2013–14 season 30–8, 12–6 in Big Ten play to finish in a tie for a second place. They lost in the semifinals in the Big Ten tournament to Michigan State. They received at-large bid to the NCAA tournament as a No. 2 seed in the West region. They defeated American and Oregon to advance to the Sweet Sixteen. They defeated Baylor and Arizona to advance to the Final Four. However, they were eliminated by Kentucky in the Final Four.

== Departures ==
Name	Number	Pos.	Height	Weight	Year	Hometown	Notes
Ben Brust	1	G	6'1"	195	Senior	Hawthorn Woods, IL	Graduated
Zach Bohannon	34	F	6'6"	210	RS Senior	Marion, IA	Graduated
Evan Anderson	32	C	6'10"	255	RS Junior	Stanley, WI	Graduated

== 2014 Commitments ==
College recruiting information
Name	Hometown	School	Height	Weight	Commit date
Ethan Happ; PF	Taylor Ridge, IL	Rockridge	6 ft 8 in (2.03 m)	200 lb (91 kg)	Jun 26, 2013
Ethan Happ; PF	Recruit ratings: Scout: Rivals: 247Sports: ESPN:				
T.J. Schlundt; SG	Oconomowoc, WI	SJNMA	6 ft 4 in (1.93 m)	180 lb (82 kg)	May 13, 2014
T.J. Schlundt; SG	Recruit ratings: Scout: Rivals: 247Sports: ESPN:				
Overall recruit ranking:
Note: In many cases, Scout, Rivals, 247Sports, On3, and ESPN may conflict in their listings of height and weight.; In these cases, the average was taken. ESPN grades are on a 100-point scale.; Sources: "2014 Wisconsin Commitments". Rivals.; "Men's Basketball Recruiting". Scout.; "ESPN- Wisconsin Badgers Men's Basketball Recruiting". ESPN.; "Scout.com Team Recruiting Rankings". Scout.; "2014 Team Ranking". Rivals.

== Awards ==
All-Big Ten by Media

- Frank Kaminsky - Player of the Year & 1st team (both unanimous)
- Sam Dekker - 2nd team
- Nigel Hayes - 3rd team

All-Big Ten by Coaches

- Bo Ryan - Coach of the Year
- Frank Kaminsky - Player of the Year & 1st team (unanimous)
- Sam Dekker - 2nd team
- Nigel Hayes - 3rd team
- Josh Gasser - All-Defensive team

== Roster ==
2014–15 Wisconsin Badgers men's basketball team
Players
Coaches

Pos.	#	Name	Height	Weight	Year	Hometown
G	2	Jordan Smith	6 ft 3 in (1.91 m)	180 lb (82 kg)	RS Jr	Orono, MN
G	3	Zak Showalter	6 ft 2 in (1.88 m)	185 lb (84 kg)	RS So	Germantown, WI
G	4	Matt Ferris (W)	6 ft 6 in (1.98 m)	195 lb (88 kg)	Fr	Appleton, WI
F	5	Aaron Moesch (W)	6 ft 8 in (2.03 m)	215 lb (98 kg)	RS Fr	Green Bay, WI
F	10	Nigel Hayes	6 ft 8 in (2.03 m)	235 lb (107 kg)	So	Toledo, OH
G	11	Jordan Hill (redshirt)	6 ft 3 in (1.91 m)	175 lb (79 kg)	So	Pasadena, CA
G	12	Traevon Jackson (injured)	6 ft 3 in (1.91 m)	207 lb (94 kg)	Sr	Westerville, OH
F	13	Duje Dukan	6 ft 10 in (2.08 m)	218 lb (99 kg)	RS Sr	Deerfield, IL
F	15	Sam Dekker	6 ft 9 in (2.06 m)	230 lb (104 kg)	Jr	Sheboygan, WI
G	20	T. J. Schlundt (W) (redshirt)	6 ft 5 in (1.96 m)	185 lb (84 kg)	Fr	Oconomowoc, WI
G	21	Josh Gasser	6 ft 4 in (1.93 m)	192 lb (87 kg)	RS Sr	Port Washington, WI
F	22	Ethan Happ (redshirt)	6 ft 9 in (2.06 m)	230 lb (104 kg)	Fr	Taylor Ridge, IL
G	24	Bronson Koenig	6 ft 4 in (1.93 m)	190 lb (86 kg)	So	La Crosse, WI
F	30	Vitto Brown	6 ft 8 in (2.03 m)	237 lb (108 kg)	So	Bowling Green, OH
G	35	Riley Dearring	6 ft 5 in (1.96 m)	182 lb (83 kg)	RS Fr	Minnetonka, MN
F	44	Frank Kaminsky	7 ft 0 in (2.13 m)	242 lb (110 kg)	Sr	Lisle, IL

Head coach

- Bo Ryan (Wilkes)

Assistant coach(es)

- Greg Gard (UW-Platteville)
- Gary Close (Arizona State)
- Lamont Paris (Wooster)

Legend

- (C) Team captain
- (S) Suspended
- (I) Ineligible
- (W) Walk-on
- Injured
- Current redshirt

Roster

== Schedule and results ==
Date time, TV	Rank^{#}	Opponent^{#}	Result	Record	High points	High rebounds	High assists	Site (attendance) city, state
Exhibition
Nov 5*; 7:00 pm	No. 3	UW–Parkside	W 77–40	–	19 – Kaminsky	11 – Tied	3 – Tied	Kohl Center (17,279); Madison, WI
Non-conference regular season
Nov 14*; 8:00 pm, BTN	No. 3	Northern Kentucky	W 62–31	1–0	16 – Kaminsky	11 – Kaminsky	4 – Kaminsky	Kohl Center (17,279); Madison, WI
Nov 16*; 12:00 pm, ESPNews	No. 3	Chattanooga; Battle 4 Atlantis	W 89–45	2–0	18 – Dekker	13 – Hayes	4 – Tied	Kohl Center (17,279); Madison, WI
Nov 19*; 8:00 pm, BTN	No. 3	Green Bay	W 84–60	3–0	25 – Hayes	15 – Kaminsky	4 – Jackson	Kohl Center (17,279); Madison, WI
Nov 22*; 9:00 pm, BTN	No. 3	Boise State	W 78–54	4–0	26 – Kaminsky	5 – Tied	5 – Jackson	Kohl Center (17,279); Madison, WI
Nov 26*; 6:00 pm, AXS TV	No. 2	vs. UAB; Battle 4 Atlantis Quarterfinals	W 72–43	5–0	16 – Kaminsky	8 – Kaminsky	4 – Hayes	Imperial Arena (2,633); Nassau, BAH
Nov 27*; 2:30 pm, ESPN	No. 2	vs. Georgetown; Battle 4 Atlantis Semifinals	W 68–65	6–0	17 – Dekker	7 – Hayes	4 – Koenig	Imperial Arena (3,204); Nassau, BAH
Nov 28*; 3:00 pm, ESPN	No. 2	vs. Oklahoma; Battle 4 Atlantis Championship	W 69–56	7–0	17 – Kaminsky	7 – Tied	8 – Jackson	Imperial Arena (2,667); Nassau, BAH
Dec 3*; 8:30 pm, ESPN	No. 2	No. 4 Duke; ACC–Big Ten Challenge	L 70–80	7–1	25 – Jackson	9 – Kaminsky	3 – Gasser	Kohl Center (17,279); Madison, WI
Dec 6*; 11:30 am, CBS	No. 2	at Marquette; Rivalry	W 49–38	8–1	15 – Kaminsky	10 – Kaminsky	3 – Tied	BMO Harris Bradley Center (18,573); Milwaukee, WI
Dec 10*; 8:00 pm, ESPN2	No. 5	at Milwaukee	W 93–54	9–1	18 – Kaminsky	7 – Hayes	3 – Jackson	UW–Milwaukee Panther Arena (10,120); Milwaukee, WI
Dec 13*; 2:00 pm, BTN	No. 5	Nicholls State	W 86–43	10–1	17 – Dekker	8 – Hayes	4 – Kaminsky	Kohl Center (17,279); Madison, WI
Dec 22*; 8:00 pm, ESPN2	No. 6	at California	W 68–56	11–1	17 – Hayes	13 – Hayes	4 – Jackson	Haas Pavilion (11,877); Berkeley, CA
Dec 28*; 7:00 pm, BTN	No. 6	Buffalo	W 68–56	12–1	25 – Kaminsky	11 – Kaminsky	5 – Jackson	Kohl Center (17,279); Madison, WI
Big Ten regular season
Dec 31; 12:00 pm, BTN	No. 4	Penn State	W 89–72	13–1 (1–0)	21 – Hayes	14 – Kaminsky	3 – Hayes	Kohl Center (17,279); Madison, WI
Jan 4; 7:30 pm, BTN	No. 4	at Northwestern	W 81–58	14–1 (2–0)	16 – Tied	10 – Kaminsky	6 – Tied	Welsh-Ryan Arena (8,117); Evanston, IL
Jan 7; 6:00 pm, BTN	No. 4	Purdue	W 62–55	15–1 (3–0)	21 – Kaminsky	5 – Tied	2 – Tied	Kohl Center (17,279); Madison, WI
Jan 11; 5:00 pm, BTN	No. 4	at Rutgers	L 62–67	15–2 (3–1)	15 – Tied	10 – Hayes	5 – Hayes	The RAC (6,987); Piscataway, NJ
Jan 15; 8:00 pm, ESPN2	No. 7	Nebraska	W 70–55	16–2 (4–1)	22 – Kaminsky	7 – Hayes	4 – Hayes	Kohl Center (17,279); Madison, WI
Jan 20; 8:00 pm, ESPN	No. 6	No. 25 Iowa	W 82–50	17–2 (5–1)	17 – Dekker	11 – Kaminsky	6 – Kaminsky	Kohl Center (17,279); Madison, WI
Jan 24; 6:00 pm, ESPN	No. 6	at Michigan; College GameDay	W 69–64 ^{OT}	18–2 (6–1)	22 – Kaminsky	9 – Kaminsky	4 – Koenig	Crisler Center (12,579); Ann Arbor, MI
Jan 31; 11:00 am, ESPN	No. 5	at Iowa	W 74–63	19–2 (7–1)	24 – Kaminsky	9 – Kaminsky	3 – Hayes	Carver–Hawkeye Arena (15,400); Iowa City, IA
Feb 3; 6:00 pm, ESPN	No. 5	No. 25 Indiana	W 92–78	20–2 (8–1)	23 – Kaminsky	6 – Tied	3 – Tied	Kohl Center (17,279); Madison, WI
Feb 7; 4:30 pm, BTN	No. 5	Northwestern	W 65–50	21–2 (9–1)	16 – Tied	9 – Gasser	5 – Kaminsky	Kohl Center (17,279); Madison, WI
Feb 10; 8:00 pm, ESPN	No. 5	at Nebraska	W 65–55	22–2 (10–1)	21 – Dekker	12 – Kamisnky	4 – Kaminsky	Pinnacle Bank Arena (15,701); Lincoln, NE
Feb 15; 12:00 pm, CBS	No. 5	Illinois	W 68–49	23–2 (11–1)	23 – Kaminsky	11 – Kaminsky	4 – Koenig	Kohl Center (17,279); Madison, WI
Feb 18; 6:00 pm, BTN	No. 5	at Penn State	W 55–47	24–2 (12–1)	22 – Dekker	13 – Hayes	4 – Koenig	Bryce Jordan Center (7,132); University Park, PA
Feb 21; 11:00 am, ESPN	No. 5	Minnesota	W 63–53	25–2 (13–1)	21 – Kaminsky	7 – Hayes	3 – Tied	Kohl Center (17,279); Madison, WI
Feb 24; 6:00 pm, ESPN	No. 5	at No. 14 Maryland	L 53–59	25–3 (13–2)	18 – Kaminsky	9 – Dekker	2 – Tied	Xfinity Center (17,950); College Park, MD
Mar 1; 3:00 pm, CBS	No. 5	Michigan State	W 68–61	26–3 (14–2)	31 – Kaminsky	9 – Dekker	3 – Tied	Kohl Center (17,279); Madison, WI
Mar 5; 6:00 pm, ESPN	No. 6	at Minnesota	W 76–63	27–3 (15–2)	25 – Kaminsky	9 – Hayes	7 – Kaminsky	Williams Arena (14,625); Minneapolis, MN
Mar 8; 3:30 pm, CBS	No. 6	at No. 23 Ohio State	W 72–48	28–3 (16–2)	20 – Kaminsky	8 – Tied	3 – Kaminsky	Value City Arena (18,077); Columbus, OH
Big Ten tournament
Mar 13; 11:00 am, ESPN	No. 6	vs. Michigan; Quarterfinals	W 71–60	29–3	17 – Dekker	12 – Kaminsky	6 – Dekker	United Center (17,290); Chicago, IL
Mar 14; 12:00 pm, CBS	No. 6	vs. Purdue; Semifinals	W 71–51	30–3	19 – Koenig	8 – Dekker	5 – Tied	United Center (18,088); Chicago, IL
Mar 15; 2:30 pm, CBS	No. 6	vs. Michigan State; Championship game	W 80–69 ^{OT}	31–3	25 – Hayes	5 – Tied	9 – Koenig	United Center (17,213); Chicago, IL
NCAA tournament
Mar 20*; 8:20 pm, TBS	(1 W) No. 3	vs. (16 W) Coastal Carolina; Second round	W 86–72	32–3	27 – Kaminsky	12 – Kaminsky	4 – Tied	CenturyLink Center Omaha (17,534); Omaha, NE
Mar 22*; 6:40 pm, truTV	(1 W) No. 3	vs. (8 W) Oregon; Third round	W 72–65	33–3	17 – Dekker	7 – Kaminsky	4 – Gasser	CenturyLink Center Omaha (17,563); Omaha, NE
Mar 26*; 6:47 pm, TBS	(1 W) No. 3	vs. (4 W) No. 15 North Carolina; Sweet Sixteen	W 79–72	34–3	23 – Dekker	10 – Dekker	4 – Tied	Staples Center (18,809); Los Angeles, CA
Mar 28*; 5:09 pm, TBS	(1 W) No. 3	vs. (2 W) No. 5 Arizona; Elite Eight	W 85–78	35–3	29 – Kaminsky	6 – Kaminsky	4 – Hayes	Staples Center (19,125); Los Angeles, CA
Apr 4*; 7:45 pm, TBS	(1 W) No. 3	vs. (1 MW) No. 1 Kentucky; Final Four	W 71–64	36–3	20 – Kaminsky	11 – Kaminsky	2 – Tied	Lucas Oil Stadium (72,238); Indianapolis, IN
Apr 6*; 8:10 pm, CBS	(1 W) No. 3	vs. (1 S) No. 4 Duke; National Championship	L 63–68	36–4	21 – Kaminsky	12 – Kaminsky	4 – Koenig	Lucas Oil Stadium (71,149); Indianapolis, IN
*Non-conference game. ^{#}Rankings from AP Poll. (#) Tournament seedings in parentheses. W=West region, MW=Midwest region, S=South region. All times are in Central Time.

== Rankings ==
Ranking movements Legend: ██ Increase in ranking ██ Decrease in ranking
	Week																			
Poll	Pre	2	3	4	5	6	7	8	9	10	11	12	13	14	15	16	17	18	19	Final
AP	3	3	2	2	5	5	6	4	4	7	6	5	5	5	5	5	6	6	3	
Coaches	4	4	3	4	6	6	6	4	4	6	5	5	4	4	4	4	5	5	3	2

== Player statistics ==
- As of April 7, 2015

		        MINUTES    |--TOTAL--|   |--3-PTS--| |-F-THROWS-| |---REBOUNDS---|                 |-SCORING-| 
## Player           GP GS Tot  Avg  FG  FGA  Pct  3FG 3FA Pct FT FTA  Pct  Off Def Tot Avg PF FO  A  TO Blk Stl Pts Avg
44 Kaminsky, Frank  39 39 1311 33.6 267 488 .547  42 101 .416 156 200 .780  58 262 320 8.2 65  0 103  63 57 33 732 18.8
15 Dekker, Sam      40 40 1239 31.0 213 406 .525  50 151 .331  80 113 .708  77 143 220 5.5 42  0  49  36 18 21 556 13.9
10 Hayes, Nigel     40 40 1318 33.0 166 334 .497  40 101 .396 125 168 .744  85 162 247 6.2 76  1  79  51 16 34 497 12.4
24 Koenig, Bronson  40 24 1152 28.8 115 278 .414  62 153 .405  56  69 .812  19  51  70 1.8 64  2  98  33  8  9 348  8.7
12 Jackson, Traevon 21 17  506 24.1  60 139 .432  11  39 .282  40  47 .851   4  31  35 1.7 27  0  54  32  3 19 171  8.1
21 Gasser, Josh     40 40 1320 33.0  77 174 .443  49 126 .389  62  75 .827  29 110 139 3.5 90  1  70  21  8 30 265  6.6
13 Dukan, Duje      38  0  605 15.9  60 155 .387  29  91 .319  31  46 .674  28  70  98 2.6 48  0  24  25  3  8 180  4.7
03 Showalter, Zak   35  0  266  7.6  23  53 .334   2  14 .143  24  27 .889  18  27  45 1.3 38  0  16   5  4 10  72  2.1
30 Brown, Vitto     34  0  214  6.3  26  59 .441   0   0 .000  10  17 .588  12  31  43 1.3 38  0   7  15  8  8  62  1.8
35 Dearring, Riley  15  0   39  2.6   4  10 .400   3   7 .429   0   1 .000   0   4   4 0.3  5  0   1   6  0  1  11  0.7
05 Moesch, Aaron    14  0   28  2.0   2   7 .286   0   1 .000   0   2 .000   2   4   6 0.4  4  0   3   2  1  0   4  0.3
04 Ferris, Matt      9  0   17  1.9   1   3 .333   0   1 .000   0   0 .000   3   2   5 0.6  1  0   0   1  1  1   2  0.2
02 Smith, Jordan    14  0   35  2.5   0   9 .000   0   5 .000   0   0 .000   1   1   2 0.1  3  0   0   0  0  0   0  0.0
   Team                                                                      47  57 104       0       6
   Total..........  40  8050 1014 2115 .479 288 790 .365 584 765 .763 383 955 1338 33.5 501  4 504 296 127 174 2900 72.5
   Opponents......  40  8050  896 2092 .428 202 538 .375 333 469 .710 297 809 1106 27.7 723 10 359 378  84 163 2327 58.2

== Season highs ==
		Player	Game	Date
Points	31	Frank Kaminsky	vs. Michigan State	March 1, 2015
Rebounds	15	Frank Kaminsky	vs. Green Bay	November 19, 2014
Assists	9	Bronson Koenig	vs. Michigan State	March 15, 2015
Steals	4	Frank Kaminsky	at Marquette	December 6, 2014
Steals	4	Josh Gasser	at Milwaukee	December 10, 2014
Blocks	7	Frank Kaminsky	vs. Green Bay	November 19, 2014

== Departures ==
Following the 2014–15 season seniors Frank Kaminsky, Josh Gasser, Traevon Jackson and Duje Dukan had all exhausted their NCAA eligibility. Following their NCAA championship defeat when Nigel Hayes was asked if he would declare for the NBA draft he said, "I'm nowhere near good enough to do anything but come back." On April 10 Sam Dekker chose to forgo his senior year and declare for the 2015 NBA Draft.

=== NBA draft selections ===
Year	Round	Pick	Overall	Player	NBA Club
2015	1	9	9	Frank Kaminsky	Charlotte Hornets
2015	1	18	18	Sam Dekker	Houston Rockets
