= Bronson Koenig =

Native American basketball player

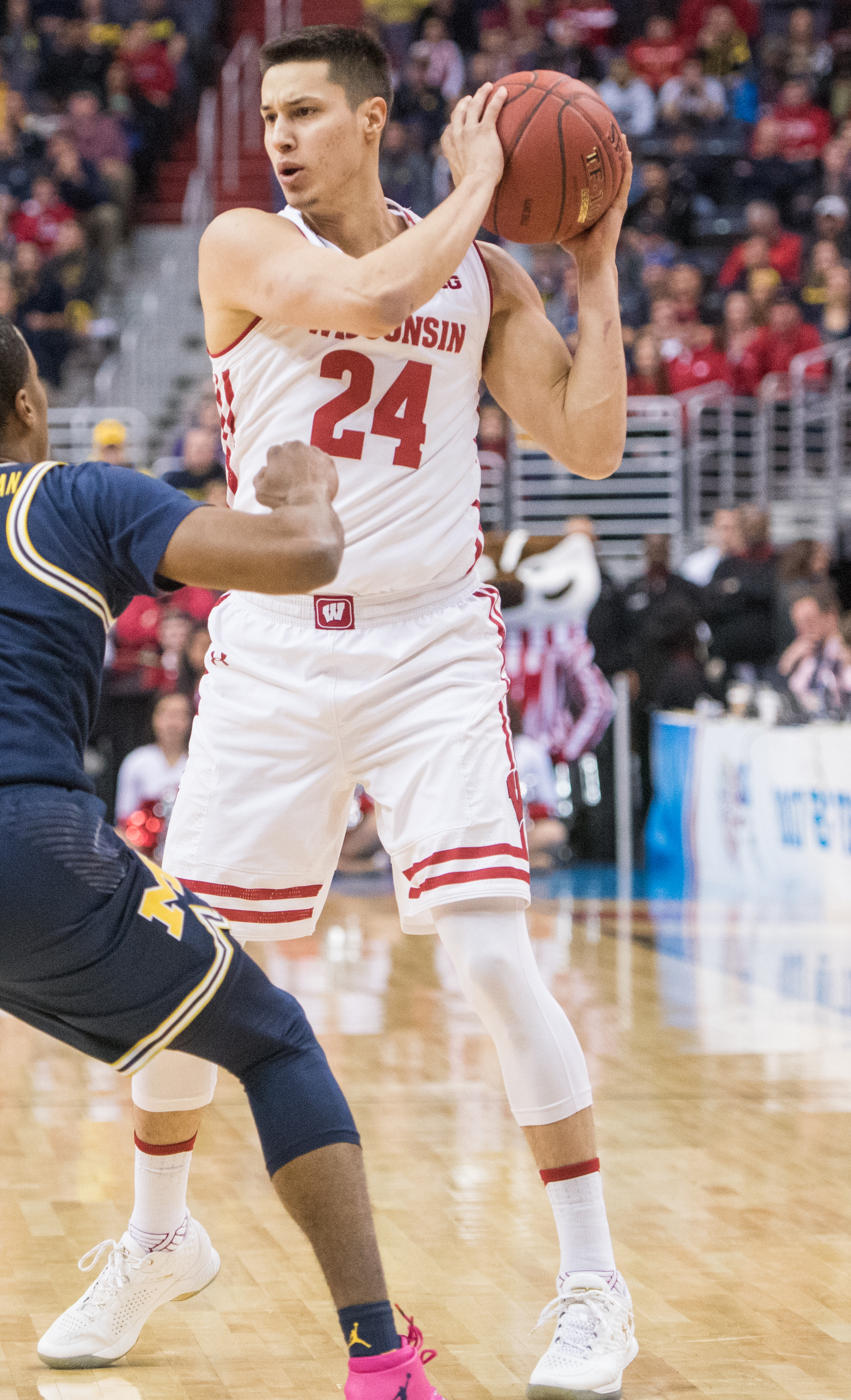
- Koenig playing for Wisconsin in 2017

Personal information
- Born: November 13, 1994 (age 32) La Crosse, Wisconsin, U.S.
- Listed height: 6 ft 4 in (1.93 m)
- Listed weight: 195 lb (88 kg)

Career information
- High school: Aquinas (La Crosse, Wisconsin)
- College: Wisconsin (2013–2017)
- NBA draft: 2017: undrafted
- Playing career: 2017–2020
- Position: Guard

Career history
- 2017–2018: Grand Rapids Drive
- 2018: Mornar
- 2019: Mineros de Zacatecas
- 2019–2020: Erie BayHawks

Career highlights
- Second-team All-Big Ten – Coaches (2017); Third-team All-Big Ten – Coaches (2016); USBWA Most Courageous Award (2017)
- Stats at Basketball Reference

Bronson Koenig (born November 13, 1994) is an American former professional basketball player. He played college basketball for the Wisconsin Badgers. Koenig attended Aquinas High School in La Crosse, Wisconsin.

== High school career ==
Koenig attended Aquinas High School in La Crosse, Wisconsin. As a sophomore, Koenig averaged 17 points and 3 assists per game. He was named First Team All-State after leading Aquinas to the 2011 Division III State Championship. He missed much of his junior season due to an injury. In his senior campaign, he again led his team to a state title and was named 2013 Wisconsin Player of the Year by the Associated Press. Koenig scored 16 points in the title game. He averaged 17.0 points and 4.4 assists per game as a senior, shooting 45.5 percent from beyond the arc. Koenig was a McDonald's All American nominee.

College recruiting
Name	Hometown	School	Height	Weight	Commit date
Bronson Koenig; PG	La Crosse, WI	Aquinas	6 ft 2 in (1.88 m)	175 lb (79 kg)	Sep 24, 2011
Bronson Koenig; PG	Recruit ratings: Scout: Rivals: ESPN: (78)				
Overall recruit ranking:
Note: In many cases, Scout, Rivals, 247Sports, On3, and ESPN may conflict in their listings of height and weight.; In these cases, the average was taken. ESPN grades are on a 100-point scale.; Sources: "2013 Wisconsin Commitments". Rivals.; "Men's Basketball Recruiting". Scout.; "ESPN- Wisconsin Badgers Men's Basketball Recruiting". ESPN.; "Scout.com Team Recruiting Rankings". Scout.; "2013 Team Ranking". Rivals.

== College career ==
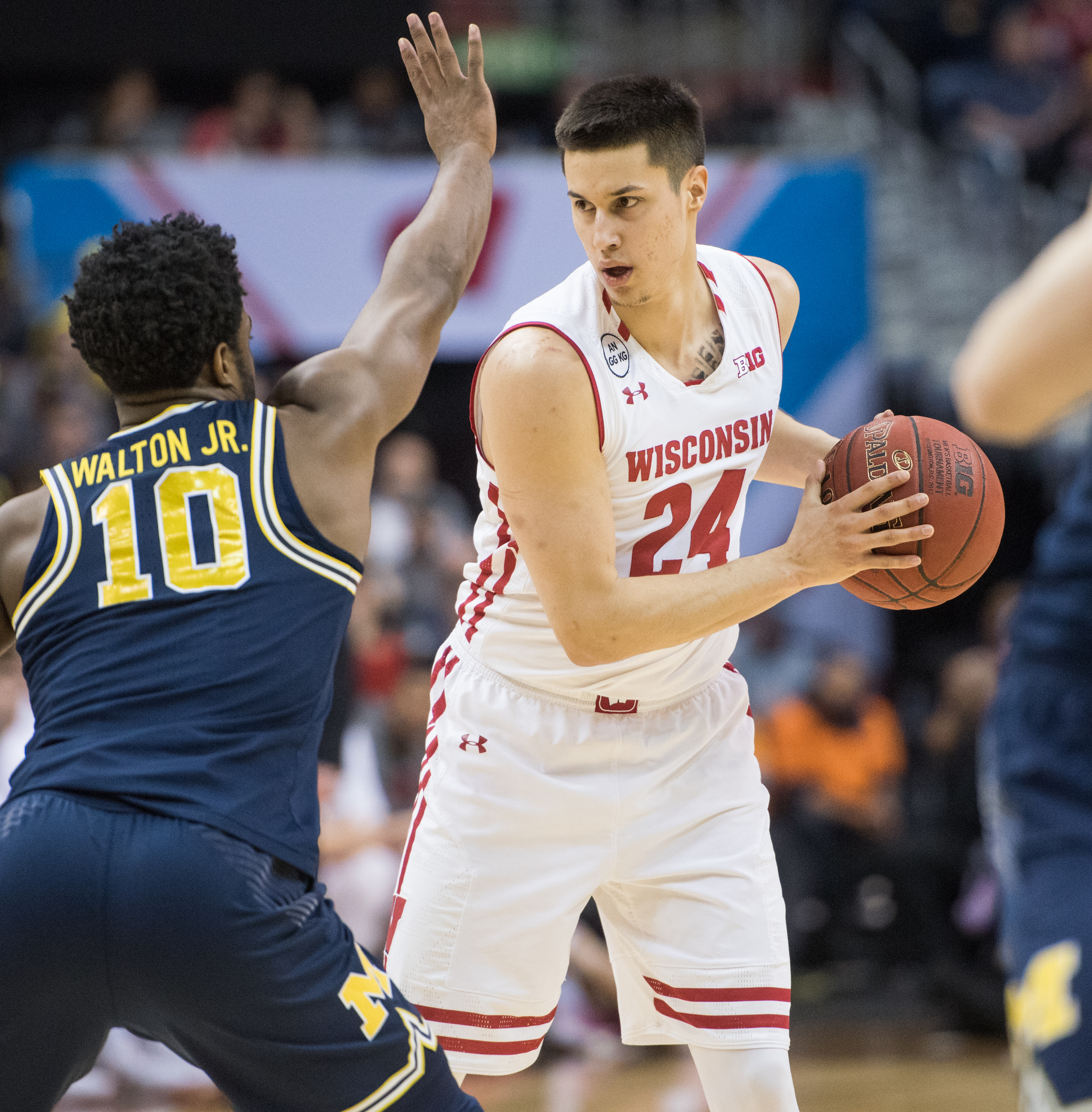
Koenig in 2017

Koenig was moved into the Badgers starting lineup during the 2014–15 season after an injury to point guard Traevon Jackson on January 11, 2015. He averaged 11.6 points per game as a starting guard.

In the second round of the 2016 NCAA basketball tournament against the Xavier Musketeers, Koenig made a game-tying three-pointer with 11.7 seconds left. Then, after a Xavier offensive foul, he made another three-pointer at the buzzer to give Wisconsin a 66–63 victory. Koenig finished the game with 20 points. After the win, he said, "I like to have the ball in my hands in those kinds of situations because I believe in myself."

Koenig set the school record for career three point shots made on February 23, 2017, in a loss at Ohio State, passing former record-holder Ben Brust. Koenig averaged 14.5 points, 2.1 rebounds and 2.0 assists per game as a senior, shooting 39.3 percent from the 3-point arc. He finished his career with 1,459 points and 270 career 3-pointers.

=== College statistics ===
Legend
GP	Games played	GS	Games started	MPG	Minutes per game
FG%	Field goal percentage	3P%	3-point field goal percentage	FT%	Free throw percentage
RPG	Rebounds per game	APG	Assists per game	SPG	Steals per game
BPG	Blocks per game	PPG	Points per game	**Bold**	Career high

Year	Team	GP	GS	MPG	FG%	3P%	FT%	RPG	APG	SPG	BPG	PPG
2013–14	Wisconsin	37	0	15.5	**.443**	.328	.750	1.2	1.1	0.3	0.1	3.5
2014–15	Wisconsin	**40**	24	28.8	.414	**.405**	.812	1.8	**2.5**	0.2	0.2	8.7
2015–16	Wisconsin	35	**35**	**34.9**	.392	.390	.763	**2.8**	2.4	0.4	0.2	13.1
2016–17	Wisconsin	36	**35**	31.4	.419	.393	**.905**	2.1	2.0	**0.6**	**0.3**	**14.5**
Career		148	94	27.5	.412	.388	.814	2.0	2.0	0.4	0.2	9.9

== Professional career ==
=== Grand Rapids Drive (2017–2018) ===
After going undrafted in the 2017 NBA draft, Koenig signed a two-way contract with the Milwaukee Bucks on July 6, 2017. On September 21, 2017, the Bucks requested waivers on Koenig. A week later, he signed a training camp deal with the Chicago Bulls. He was waived on October 14 as one of the team's final preseason roster cuts. He would later participate with the Grand Rapids Drive for the 2017-18 NBA G League season. Koenig averaged 9.8 points per game and shot 40% from the three point arc in 47 games with Grand Rapids.

=== Mornar Bar (2018) ===
On August 10, 2018, Koenig signed with Mornar Bar. He left Mornar on November 29, 2018.

=== Basket Brescia Leonessa (2019) ===
On July 19, 2019, Koenig was reported to have signed with Basket Brescia Leonessa of the Italian Lega Basket Serie A (LBA). On September 24, 2019, due to long time injury, Basket Brescia Leonessa decided to release him.

=== Erie BayHawks (2019–2020) ===
On November 29, 2019, the Erie BayHawks announced that they had traded the returning right of Taylor Braun to the Grand Rapids Drive for the returning right of Koenig. Koenig missed a game in January 2020 with an undisclosed injury. On February 11, he recorded 15 points, three rebounds and one assist in a loss to the Capital City Go-Go. He averaged 5.3 points per game.

== Personal life ==
Koenig is the son of Paul Koenig and Ethel Funmaker. He is a member of the Ho-Chunk Nation. He is opposed to using Native names as mascots, and was particularly against the Washington Redskins team name. In September 2016, Koenig and his brother drove a trailer packed with supplies 14 hours from Madison to the Standing Rock Indian Reservation, to join the protesters against the Dakota Access Pipeline. In December 2016, Koenig wrote a first-person article about the experience for The Players' Tribune entitled, "What I Found in Standing Rock."
