= 2013–14 Wisconsin Badgers men's basketball team =

American college basketball season

2013–14 Wisconsin Badgers men's basketball

Cancún Challenge Champions

NCAA tournament, Final Four
- Conference: Big Ten Conference

Ranking
- Coaches: No. 4
- AP: No. 12
- Record: 30–8 (12–6 Big Ten)
- Head coach: Bo Ryan
- Associate head coach: Greg Gard
- Assistant coaches: Gary Close; Lamont Paris
- Home arena: Kohl Center

2013–14 Big Ten Conference men's basketball standings
	Conf.				Overall
Team	W		L	PCT	W		L	PCT
No. 7 Michigan	15	–	3	.833	28	–	9	.757
No. 12 Wisconsin	12	–	6	.667	30	–	8	.789
No. 11 Michigan State†	12	–	6	.667	29	–	9	.763
Nebraska	11	–	7	.611	19	–	13	.594
No. 22 Ohio State	10	–	8	.556	25	–	10	.714
Iowa	9	–	9	.500	20	–	13	.606
Minnesota	8	–	10	.444	25	–	13	.658
Illinois	7	–	11	.389	20	–	15	.571
Indiana	7	–	11	.389	17	–	15	.531
Penn State	6	–	12	.333	16	–	18	.471
Northwestern	6	–	12	.333	14	–	19	.424
Purdue	5	–	13	.278	15	–	17	.469
† 2014 Big Ten tournament winner Rankings from AP poll

The 2013–14 Wisconsin Badgers men's basketball team represented the University of Wisconsin–Madison in the 2013–14 NCAA Division I men's basketball season. This was Bo Ryan's 13th season as head coach at Wisconsin. The team played their home games at the Kohl Center in Madison, Wisconsin and were members of the Big Ten Conference. They finished the season 30–8, 12–6 in Big Ten play to finish in a tie for second place. They lost in the semifinals in the Big Ten tournament to Michigan State. They received at-large bid to the NCAA tournament as a No. 2 seed in the West region, their 16th straight trip to the Tournament. They defeated American and Oregon to advance to the Sweet Sixteen. They defeated Baylor and Arizona to advance to the Final Four. There, they were eliminated by Kentucky.

== Previous season ==
The Badgers finished the 2012–13 season 23–12, 12–6 in Big Ten play to finish in a tie for fourth place. They defeated Michigan and Indiana before losing to Ohio State in the Big Ten tournament championship. They received an at-large bid to the NCAA tournament for the 15th consecutive year as a No. 5 seed. They were upset by No. 12-seeded Ole Miss in the Second Round.

== Departures ==
Name	Number	Pos.	Height	Weight	Year	Hometown	Notes
Ryan Evans	5	G/F	6'6"	208	RS Senior	Phoenix, AZ	Graduated
Dan Fahey	10	G	6'3"	195	Senior	Chicago, IL	Graduated
J. D. Wise	22	G	6'0"	190	Senior	Milwaukee, WI	Graduated
Mike Bruesewitz	31	F	6'6"	223	Senior	St. Paul, MN	Graduated
Jared Berggren	40	F/C	6'10"	235	RS Senior	Princeton, MN	Graduated
George Marshall	3	G	5'11"	185	Sophomore	Chicago, IL	Transferred (midseason)

== 2013 Commitments ==
College recruiting information
Name	Hometown	School	Height	Weight	Commit date
Nigel Hayes; PF	Toledo, OH	Whitmer	6 ft 7 in (2.01 m)	215 lb (98 kg)	Nov 11, 2012
Nigel Hayes; PF	Recruit ratings: Scout: Rivals: ESPN: (84)				
Bronson Koenig; PG	La Crosse, WI	Aquinas	6 ft 2 in (1.88 m)	175 lb (79 kg)	Sep 24, 2011
Bronson Koenig; PG	Recruit ratings: Scout: Rivals: ESPN: (78)				
Riley Dearring; SG	Minneapolis, MN	Hopkins	6 ft 5 in (1.96 m)	175 lb (79 kg)	Jul 19, 2012
Riley Dearring; SG	Recruit ratings: Scout: Rivals: ESPN: (75)				
Jordan Hill; SG	Pasadena, CA	Phillips Exeter Academy	6 ft 2 in (1.88 m)	165 lb (75 kg)	Aug 7, 2012
Jordan Hill; SG	Recruit ratings: Scout: Rivals: ESPN: (68)				
Vitto Brown; PF	Bowling Green, OH	Bowling Green	6 ft 7 in (2.01 m)	205 lb (93 kg)	Sep 14, 2012
Vitto Brown; PF	Recruit ratings: Scout: Rivals: ESPN: (67)				
Overall recruit ranking:
Note: In many cases, Scout, Rivals, 247Sports, On3, and ESPN may conflict in their listings of height and weight.; In these cases, the average was taken. ESPN grades are on a 100-point scale.; Sources: "2013 Wisconsin Commitments". Rivals.; "Men's Basketball Recruiting". Scout.; "ESPN- Wisconsin Badgers Men's Basketball Recruiting". ESPN.; "Scout.com Team Recruiting Rankings". Scout.; "2013 Team Ranking". Rivals.

== Awards ==
All-Big Ten by Media

- Frank Kaminsky - 1st team
- Sam Dekker - 3rd team
- Josh Gasser - Honorable mention
- Traevon Jackson - Honorable mention

All-Big Ten by Coaches

- Frank Kaminsky - 1st team
- Sam Dekker - 2nd team
- Ben Brust - Honorable mention
- Josh Gasser - All-Defensive team
- Nigel Hayes - Freshman of the Year & All-Freshman team

== Roster ==
2013–14 Wisconsin Badgers men's basketball team
Players
Coaches

Pos.	#	Name	Height	Weight	Year	Hometown
G	1	Ben Brust	6 ft 1 in (1.85 m)	195 lb (88 kg)	Sr	Hawthorn Woods, IL
G	2	Jordan Smith (W) (redshirt)	6 ft 1 in (1.85 m)	175 lb (79 kg)	Jr	Orono, MN
G	3	George Marshall	5 ft 11 in (1.8 m)	182 lb (83 kg)	RS So	Chicago, IL
F	5	Aaron Moesch (W) (redshirt)	6 ft 8 in (2.03 m)	200 lb (91 kg)	Fr	Green Bay, WI
F	10	Nigel Hayes	6 ft 7 in (2.01 m)	230 lb (104 kg)	Fr	Toledo, OH
G	11	Jordan Hill	6 ft 3 in (1.91 m)	175 lb (79 kg)	Fr	Pasadena, CA
G	12	Traevon Jackson	6 ft 2 in (1.88 m)	213 lb (97 kg)	Jr	Westerville, OH
F	13	Duje Dukan	6 ft 8 in (2.03 m)	210 lb (95 kg)	RS Jr	Deerfield, IL
F	15	Sam Dekker	6 ft 7 in (2.01 m)	220 lb (100 kg)	So	Sheboygan, WI
G	21	Josh Gasser	6 ft 3 in (1.91 m)	190 lb (86 kg)	RS Jr	Port Washington, WI
G	24	Bronson Koenig	6 ft 3 in (1.91 m)	180 lb (82 kg)	Fr	La Crosse, WI
F	30	Vitto Brown	6 ft 8 in (2.03 m)	220 lb (100 kg)	Fr	Bowling Green, OH
C	32	Evan Anderson	6 ft 10 in (2.08 m)	255 lb (116 kg)	RS Jr	Stanley, WI
G	33	Zak Showalter (W) (redshirt)	6 ft 2 in (1.88 m)	195 lb (88 kg)	So	Germantown, WI
F	34	Zach Bohannon (W)	6 ft 6 in (1.98 m)	210 lb (95 kg)	RS Sr	Marion, IA
G	35	Riley Dearring (redshirt)	6 ft 5 in (1.96 m)	180 lb (82 kg)	Fr	Minnetonka, MN
F	44	Frank Kaminsky	6 ft 11 in (2.11 m)	230 lb (104 kg)	Jr	Lisle, IL

Head coach

- Bo Ryan (Wilkes)

Assistant coach(es)

- Greg Gard (UW-Platteville)
- Gary Close (Arizona State)
- Lamont Paris (Wooster)

Legend

- (C) Team captain
- (S) Suspended
- (I) Ineligible
- (W) Walk-on
- Injured
- Current redshirt

Roster

== Schedule and results ==
Date time, TV	Rank^{#}	Opponent^{#}	Result	Record	High points	High rebounds	High assists	Site (attendance) city, state
Canadian trip
Aug 21*; 7:00 pm		at Carleton; Canadian Tour	L 82–95	–	28 – Dekker	7 – Dekker	4 – Jackson	Keith Harris Gym (N/A); Ottawa, ON
Aug 22*; 7:00 pm		at Ottawa; Canadian Tour	W 101–92	–	20 – Dekker	8 – Dekker	8 – Jackson	Montpetit Gym (N/A); Ottawa, ON
Aug 24*; 7:00 pm		vs. A-Game Hoops; Canadian Tour	W 88–76	–	17 – Brust, Kaminsky	N/A – N/A	N/A – N/A	Mattamy Athletic Centre (N/A); Toronto, ON
Aug 25*; 8:00 pm		at Ryerson; Canadian Tour	W 84–61	–	18 – Dekker	5 – Dukan, Jackson	5 – Koenig	Mattamy Athletic Centre (N/A); Toronto, ON
Aug 26*; 8:00 pm		vs. A-Game Hoops; Canadian Tour	W 113–105 ^{OT}	–	26 – Kaminsky	11 – Kaminsky	4 – Jackson, Dekker	St. Michael's College (N/A); Toronto, ON
Exhibition
Oct 30*; 7:00 pm	No. 20	UW–Platteville	W 81–50	–	20 – Brust	6 – Hayes	7 – Jackson	Kohl Center (16,439); Madison, WI
Non-conference regular season
Nov 8*; 6:00 pm, BTN	No. 20	vs. St. John's	W 86–75	1–0	19 – Gasser (1)	8 – Gasser (1)	4 – Jackson (1)	Sanford Pentagon (3,523); Sioux Falls, SD
Nov 12*; 8:00 pm, ESPN2	No. 20	No. 11 Florida	W 59–53	2–0	16 – Dekker (1)	9 – Brust (1)	4 – Jackson (2)	Kohl Center (17,249); Madison, WI
Nov 16*; 7:00 pm, ESPN3	No. 20	at Green Bay	W 69–66	3–0	16 – Kaminsky (1)	8 – Kaminsky (1)	3 – Jackson (3)	Resch Center (9,906); Green Bay, WI
Nov 19*; 7:00 pm, BTN	No. 12	North Dakota	W 103–85	4–0	43 – Kaminsky (2)	8 – Brust (2)	8 – Jackson (4)	Kohl Center (16,653); Madison, WI
Nov 21*; 7:00 pm, ESPN3	No. 12	Bowling Green; Cancún Challenge	W 88–64	5–0	19 – Brust (1)	6 – Brust (3), Gasser (2), Jackson (1)	3 – Gasser (1)	Kohl Center (16,807); Madison, WI
Nov 23*; 7:30 pm, BTN	No. 12	Oral Roberts; Cancún Challenge	W 76–67	6–0	21 – Kaminsky (3)	8 – Brust (4)	7 – Jackson (5)	Kohl Center (16,710); Madison, WI
Nov 26*; 7:30 pm, CBSSN	No. 10	vs. Saint Louis; Cancún Challenge Semifinals	W 63–57	7–0	16 – Jackson (1)	8 – Kaminsky (2)	2 – Jackson (6), Gasser (2)	Hard Rock Hotel Riviera Maya (934); Cancún, MX
Nov 27*; 8:30 pm, CBSSN	No. 10	vs. West Virginia; Cancún Challenge Championship	W 70–63	8–0	21 – Dekker (2)	12 – Dekker (1)	7 – Jackson (7)	Hard Rock Hotel Riviera Maya (934); Cancún, MX
Dec 4*; 6:00 pm, ESPN2	No. 8	at Virginia; ACC–Big Ten Challenge	W 48–38	9–0	11 – Gasser (2)	12 – Kaminsky (3)	4 – Jackson (8)	John Paul Jones Arena (11,142); Charlottesville, VA
Dec 7*; 1:15 pm, BTN	No. 8	Marquette; Rivalry	W 70–64	10–0	20 – Dekker (3)	10 – Dekker (2)	7 – Jackson (9)	Kohl Center (17,249); Madison, WI
Dec 11*; 7:00 pm	No. 4	Milwaukee	W 78–52	11–0	18 – Brust (2)	8 – Dekker (3)	6 – Dekker (1)	Kohl Center (16,987); Madison, WI
Dec 14*; 12:00 pm, ESPN3	No. 4	Eastern Kentucky	W 86–61	12–0	20 – Brust (3)	6 – Brust (5), Kaminsky (4)	4 – Gasser (3), Kaminsky (1)	Kohl Center (16,968); Madison, WI
Dec 28*; 1:00 pm, ESPNU	No. 4	Prairie View A&M	W 80–43	13–0	16 – Dekker (4)	11 – Dekker (4)	4 – Jackson (10)	Kohl Center (17,249); Madison, WI
Big Ten regular season
Jan 2; 6:00 pm, ESPN2	No. 4	at Northwestern	W 76–49	14–0 (1–0)	19 – Hayes (1)	8 – Dekker (5), Kaminsky (5)	4 – Dekker (2)	Welsh-Ryan Arena (8,117); Evanston, IL
Jan 5; 7:00 pm, BTN	No. 4	No. 22 Iowa	W 75–71	15–0 (2–0)	19 – Brust (4)	7 – Dukan (1)	3 – Jackson (11)	Kohl Center (17,249); Madison, WI
Jan 8; 8:00 pm, BTN	No. 4	No. 23 Illinois	W 95–70	16–0 (3–0)	18 – Brust (5)	6 – Brust (6), Dekker (6), Kaminsky (6)	4 – Jackson (12)	Kohl Center (17,003); Madison, WI
Jan 14; 6:00 pm, ESPN	No. 3	at Indiana	L 72–75	16–1 (3–1)	21 – Jackson (2)	9 – Kaminsky (7)	4 – Gasser (4)	Assembly Hall (17,472); Bloomington, IN
Jan 18; 5:00 pm, ESPN	No. 3	Michigan	L 70–77	16–2 (3–2)	16 – Gasser (3)	10 – Dekker (7)	5 – Jackson (13)	Kohl Center (17,249); Madison, WI
Jan 22; 8:00 pm, BTN	No. 9	at Minnesota	L 68–81	16–3 (3–3)	20 – Dekker (5)	6 – Dekker (8)	3 – Jackson (14)	Williams Arena (14,625); Minneapolis, MN
Jan 25; 4:00 pm, BTN	No. 9	at Purdue	W 72–58	17–3 (4–3)	16 – Kaminsky (4)	7 – Dekker (9), Gasser (3)	3 – Gasser (5)	Mackey Arena (14,845); West Lafayette, IN
Jan 29; 8:00 pm, BTN	No. 14	Northwestern	L 56–65	17–4 (4–4)	21 – Brust (6)	10 – Kaminsky (8)	4 – Jackson (15)	Kohl Center (17,155); Madison, WI
Feb 1; 11:00 am, ESPN	No. 14	No. 24 Ohio State	L 58–59	17–5 (4–5)	17 – Hayes (2)	7 – Brust (7)	3 – Kaminsky (2)	Kohl Center (17,249); Madison, WI
Feb 4; 8:00 pm, BTN		at Illinois	W 75–63	18–5 (5–5)	16 – Brust (7), Dekker (6)	8 – Gasser (4)	4 – Dekker (3)	State Farm Center (16,618); Champaign, IL
Feb 9; 12:00 pm, CBS		No. 9 Michigan State	W 60–58	19–5 (6–5)	14 – Hayes (3)	6 – Kaminsky (9), Gasser (5)	8 – Jackson (16)	Kohl Center (17,249); Madison, WI
Feb 13; 8:00 pm, ESPN	No. 21	Minnesota	W 78–70	20–5 (7–5)	20 – Brust (8)	7 – Dekker (10)	3 – Gasser (6)	Kohl Center (17,249); Madison, WI
Feb 16; 12:00 pm, CBS	No. 21	at No. 15 Michigan	W 75–62	21–5 (8–5)	25 – Kaminsky (5)	11 – Kaminsky (10)	6 – Jackson (17)	Crisler Arena (12,707); Ann Arbor, MI
Feb 22; 11:00 am, ESPN2	No. 16	at No. 15 Iowa	W 79–74	22–5 (9–5)	21 – Kaminsky (6)	11 – Dekker (11)	3 – Jackson (18), Hayes (1)	Carver-Hawkeye Arena (15,400); Iowa City, IA
Feb 25; 8:00 pm, ESPN	No. 14	Indiana	W 69–58	23–5 (10–5)	16 – Dekker (7)	9 – Kaminsky (11)	2 – Gasser (7), Dekker (4)	Kohl Center (17,249); Madison, WI
Mar 2; 11:00 am, BTN	No. 14	at Penn State	W 71–66	24–5 (11–5)	15 – Gasser (4)	8 – Dekker (12)	5 – Jackson (19)	Bryce Jordan Center (7,807); University Park, PA
Mar 5; 8:00 pm, BTN	No. 9	Purdue	W 76–70	25–5 (12–5)	22 – Kaminsky (7)	6 – Hayes (1)	4 – Jackson (20)	Kohl Center (17,249); Madison, WI
Mar 9; 6:30 pm, BTN	No. 9	at Nebraska	L 68–77	25–6 (12–6)	14 – Kaminsky (8)	9 – Gasser (6)	5 – Gasser (8)	Pinnacle Bank Arena (15,998); Lincoln, NE
Big Ten tournament
Mar 14; 5:30 pm, BTN	No. 12	vs. Minnesota; Quarterfinals	W 83–57	26–6	29 – Brust (9)	12 – Kaminsky (12)	4 – Jackson (21)	Bankers Life Fieldhouse (N/A); Indianapolis, IN
Mar 15; 3:15 pm, CBS	No. 12	vs. No. 22 Michigan State; Semifinals	L 75–83	26–7	28 – Kaminsky (9)	7 – Dekker (13)	5 – Jackson (22)	Bankers Life Fieldhouse (18,626); Indianapolis, IN
NCAA tournament
Mar 20*; 11:40 am, TruTV	No. 12 (2 W)	vs. (15 W) American; Second round	W 75–35	27–7	18 – Jackson (3)	6 – Dekker (14)	4 – Gasser (9)	BMO Harris Bradley Center (17,749); Milwaukee, WI
Mar 22*; 6:45 pm, CBS	No. 12 (2 W)	vs. (7 W) Oregon; Third round	W 85–77	28–7	19 – Kaminsky (10)	8 – Dekker (15), Jackson (2)	5 – Jackson (23)	BMO Harris Bradley Center (18,206); Milwaukee, WI
Mar 27*; 6:47 pm, TBS	No. 12 (2 W)	vs. No. 23 (6 W) Baylor; Sweet Sixteen	W 69–52	29–7	19 – Kaminsky (11)	8 – Gasser (7)	5 – Jackson (24)	Honda Center (17,773); Anaheim, CA
Mar 29*; 7:49 pm, TBS	No. 12 (2 W)	vs. No. 4 (1 W) Arizona; Elite Eight	W 64–63 ^{OT}	30–7	28 – Kaminsky (12)	11 – Kaminsky (13)	5 – Jackson (25)	Honda Center (17,814); Anaheim, CA
Apr 5*; 7:49 pm, TBS	No. 12 (2 W)	vs. (8 MW) Kentucky; Final Four	L 73–74	30–8	15 – Brust (10), Dekker (8)	5 – Kaminsky (14), Gasser (8), Dukan (2)	3 – Jackson (26), Gasser (10)	AT&T Stadium (79,444); Arlington, TX
*Non-conference game. ^{#}Rankings from AP Poll. (#) Tournament seedings in parentheses. All times are in Central Time.

== Rankings ==
Legend: ██ Increase in ranking. ██ Decrease in ranking.
Poll	Pre	Wk 2	Wk 3	Wk 4	Wk 5	Wk 6	Wk 7	Wk 8	Wk 9	Wk 10	Wk 11	Wk 12	Wk 13	Wk 14	Wk 15	Wk 16	Wk 17	Wk 18	Wk 19	Wk 20	Final
AP	20	20	12	10	8	4	4	4	4	4	3	9	14	RV	21	16	14	9	12	12	N/A
Coaches	21	19	15	11	9	6	6	6	5	4т	3	8	13	24	21	18	14	11	13	15	4

== Player statistics ==
- As of April 6, 2014

		        MINUTES    |--TOTAL--|   |--3-PTS--| |-F-THROWS-| |---REBOUNDS---|                 |-SCORING-| 
## Player           GP GS Tot  Avg  FG  FGA  Pct  3FG 3FA Pct FT FTA  Pct  Off Def Tot Avg PF FO  A TO Blk Stl Pts Avg 
44 Kaminsky, Frank  38 38 1032 27.2 196 371 .528  37  98 .378 101 132 .765  81 159 240 6.3 96  1  49  39 66 26 530 13.9
01 Brust, Ben       38 38 1318 34.8 156 372 .419  96 244 .393  80  89 .899  31 140 171 4.5 36  0  50  27  2 29 488 12.8
15 Dekker, Sam      38 38 1134 29.8 168 358 .469  42 129 .326  94 137 .686  65 166 231 6.1 52  0  52  41 22 29 472 12.4
12 Jackson, Traevon 38 38 1170 30.8 122 299 .408  34  89 .382 129 167 .772  20 124 144 3.8 88  0  151 82  4 26 407 10.7
21 Gasser, Josh     38 38 1270 33.4  84 194 .433  47 109 .431 118 136 .868  21 131 152 4.0 97  2  72  32  6 25 333  8.8
10 Hayes, Nigel     38  0  663 17.4  98 192 .510   0   0 .000  96 164 .585  34  72 106 2.8 99  1  36  45 20 32 292  7.7
24 Koenig, Bronson  37  0  572 15.5  51 115 .443  22  67 .328   6   8 .750  18  28  46 1.2 50  0  41  18  3 11 130  3.5
13 Dukan, Duje      38  0  309  8.1  41  82 .500  15  41 .366  10  14 .714  19  38  57 1.5 32  0  11   8  1  3 107  2.8
03 Marshall, George  2  0   25 12.5   1   4 .250   0   2 .000   2   2 1.000  0   0   0 0.0  2  0   1   1  0  0   4  2.0
34 Bohannon, Zach   14  0   27  1.9   4   7 .571   2   3 .667   2   2 1.000  2   3   5 0.4  1  0   0   0  0  2  12  0.9
11 Hill, Jordan     11  0   25  2.3   1   7 .143   1   4 .250   4   7 .571   1   2   3 0.3  5  0   1   2  0  0   7  0.6
30 Brown, Vitto     14  0   44  3.1   3  11 .273   0   0 .000   0   3 .000   0  12  12 0.9  5  0   3   2  0  0   6  0.4
32 Anderson, Evan   14  0   36  2.6   2   6 .333   1   4 .250   0   0 .000   0   3   3 0.2  9  0   1   2  3  0   5  0.4
   Team                                                                    45  51  96       2      8 
   Total..........  38  7625  927 2018 .459 297 790 .376 642 861 .746 337 929 1266 33.3 574  4 468  307 127 183 2793 73.5
   Opponents......  38  7625  915 2134 .429 184 540 .341 418 579 .722 350 862 1212 31.9 763  6 364  370 105 161 2432 64.0

== Records and milestones ==
- On November 19, 2013, Frank Kaminsky broke the Wisconsin's single-game record for most points, with 43 against North Dakota.
- On December 4, 2013, Bo Ryan won his 300th game at Wisconsin during a 48–38 victory over Virginia. Ryan became only the 9th Big Ten head coach to win 300 games.
- On January 8, 2014, Wisconsin defeated Illinois 95–70 giving the Badgers a 16–0 record, the best start in the school's history.
- On March 14, 2014, Wisconsin defeated Minnesota 83–57 giving coach Bo Ryan his 700th career victory as a head coach.
- On March 22, 2014, Ben Brust broke the record for most career three-pointers with his 228th vs. the Oregon during an 85–77 victory in the third round of the 2014 NCAA tournament. The previous record was held by Tim Locom (1988–91).
- On March 29, 2014, Wisconsin defeated Arizona 64–63 to qualify for the NCAA Final Four for the third time in school history, its first since the 2000 NCAA Division I men's basketball tournament
