= 2014 NCAA Division I men's basketball tournament =

Edition of USA college basketball tournament

- Teams: 68
- Finals site: AT&T Stadium, Arlington, Texas
- Champions: UConn Huskies (4th title, 4th title game, 5th Final Four)
- Runner-up: Kentucky Wildcats (12th title game, 16th Final Four)
- Semifinalists: Florida Gators (5th Final Four); Wisconsin Badgers (3rd Final Four)
- Winning coach: Kevin Ollie (1st title)
- MOP: Shabazz Napier (UConn)

The 2014 NCAA Division I men's basketball tournament involved 68 teams playing in a single-elimination tournament that determined the National Collegiate Athletic Association (NCAA) Division I men's basketball national champion for the 2013-14 season. The 76th annual edition of the tournament began on March 18, 2014, and concluded with the championship game on April 7, at AT&T Stadium in Arlington, Texas.

The East Regional semifinals and final were held in Madison Square Garden, the first time that arena has been used as an NCAA Tournament venue and the first time in 63 years that tournament games have been held in New York City.

The Final Four consisted of Florida (the #1 overall seed of the tournament), making their first appearance since winning their second consecutive championship in 2007, UConn, returning after winning their 2011 national championship, Wisconsin, making their first appearance since 2000, and Kentucky, back in the Final Four after winning their 2012 national championship.

With No. 7 seed UConn and No. 8 seed Kentucky reaching the championship game, this tournament's final was the first ever not to include at least one team seeded 1–3. It was also only the third final not to feature a 1 or 2 seed (1989 – #3 Michigan vs. #3 Seton Hall and 2011 – #3 UConn vs. #8 Butler) and is the fourth ever (2023 – #4 UConn vs #5 San Diego State). UConn defeated Kentucky in the championship game 60–54, to claim their 4th national championship as in many attempts. UConn was also the first 7 seed ever to reach and win the championship game. The two teams combined for the highest seed total in championship game history with 15. The previous record (11) was held by UConn and Butler in 2011.

The next day, the UConn Huskies women's team won the women's NCAA basketball tournament, only the second time that a school has won both the men's and women's Division I national basketball championships in the same year; UConn first accomplished this in 2004.

This was the first men's final four with a region as host instead of a city.

== Tournament procedure ==
For 2014 the selection committee picked a total of 68 teams that would enter the 2014 tournament, of which 32 were "automatic bids" (teams winning their conference tournaments, with the exception of the Ivy League, which does not host a post-season conference tournament; thus, its regular-season conference champion is awarded the automatic bid) while the remaining 36 were "at large" bids which were extended by the NCAA Selection Committee on the Sunday preceding the First Four play-in tournament and dubbed Selection Sunday by the media and fans. The Selection Committee also seeded the entire field from 1 to 68.

Eight teams – the four lowest-seeded automatic qualifiers and the four lowest-seeded at-large teams – played in the First Four (the successor to what had been popularly known as "play-in games" through the 2010 tournament). The winners of those games advanced to the main draw of the tournament.

== Schedule and venues ==
2014 First Four (orange) and first and second rounds (green)
2014 Regionals (blue) and Final Four (red)

The following are the sites selected to host each round of the 2014 tournament:

First Four

- March 18 and 19
  - University of Dayton Arena, Dayton, Ohio (Host: University of Dayton)

First and Second rounds

- March 20 and 22
  - First Niagara Center, Buffalo, New York (Hosts: Canisius College, Niagara University, Metro Atlantic Athletic Conference)
  - Bradley Center, Milwaukee, Wisconsin (Host: Marquette University)
  - Amway Center, Orlando, Florida (Host: Stetson University)
  - Spokane Veterans Memorial Arena, Spokane, Washington (Host: Washington State University)
- March 21 and 23
  - PNC Arena, Raleigh, North Carolina (Host: North Carolina State University)
  - AT&T Center, San Antonio, Texas (Host: University of Texas at San Antonio)
  - Viejas Arena, San Diego, California (Host: San Diego State University)
  - Scottrade Center, St. Louis, Missouri (Host: Missouri Valley Conference)

Regional semifinals and finals (Sweet Sixteen and Elite Eight)

- March 27 and 29
  - South Regional, FedExForum, Memphis, Tennessee (Host: University of Memphis)
  - West Regional, Honda Center, Anaheim, California (Host: Big West Conference)
- March 28 and 30
  - East Regional, Madison Square Garden, New York, New York (Hosts: St. John's University, Big East Conference)
  - Midwest Regional, Lucas Oil Stadium, Indianapolis, Indiana (Hosts: IUPUI, Horizon League)

National semifinals and championship (Final Four and championship)

- April 5 and 7
  - AT&T Stadium, Arlington, Texas (Host: Big 12 Conference)

== Qualified teams ==
=== Automatic qualifiers ===
The following teams are automatic qualifiers for the 2014 NCAA field by virtue of winning their conference's tournament (except for the Ivy League, whose regular-season champion receives the automatic bid).

Conference	Team	Appearance	Last bid
ACC	Virginia	18th	2012
America East	Albany	4th	2013
American	Louisville	40th	2013
Atlantic 10	Saint Joseph's	20th	2008
Atlantic Sun	Mercer	3rd	1985
Big 12	Iowa State	16th	2013
Big East	Providence	16th	2004
Big Sky	Weber State	15th	2007
Big South	Coastal Carolina	3rd	1993
Big Ten	Michigan State	28th	2013
Big West	Cal Poly	1st	Never
Colonial	Delaware	5th	1999
C-USA	Tulsa	15th	2003
Horizon	Milwaukee	4th	2006
Ivy League	Harvard	4th	2013
MAAC	Manhattan	7th	2004
MAC	Western Michigan	4th	2004
MEAC	North Carolina Central	1st	Never
Missouri Valley	Wichita State	11th	2013
Mountain West	New Mexico	15th	2013
Northeast	Mount St. Mary's	4th	2008
Ohio Valley	Eastern Kentucky	8th	2007
Pac-12	UCLA	46th	2013
Patriot	American	3rd	2009
SEC	Florida	19th	2013
Southern	Wofford	3rd	2011
Southland	Stephen F. Austin	2nd	2009
SWAC	Texas Southern	5th	2003
Summit	North Dakota State	2nd	2009
Sun Belt	Louisiana–Lafayette	6th	2000 (Note: Louisiana–Lafayette had more recent NCAA tournament appearances in 2004 and 2005, but those appearances were later vacated.)
West Coast	Gonzaga	17th	2013
WAC	New Mexico State	21st	2013

=== Tournament seeds ===
South Region – FedEx Forum, Memphis, Tennessee
Seed	School	Conference	Record	Overall Seed	Berth type	Last bid
1	Florida	SEC	32–2	1	Automatic	2013
2	Kansas	Big 12	24–9	7	At–large	2013
3	Syracuse	ACC	27–5	10	At–large	2013
4	UCLA	Pac-12	26–8	15	Automatic	2013
5	VCU	Atlantic 10	26–8	19	At–large	2013
6	Ohio State	Big Ten	25–9	22	At–large	2013
7	New Mexico	Mountain West	27–6	28	Automatic	2013
8	Colorado	Pac-12	23–11	32	At–large	2013
9	Pittsburgh	ACC	25–9	36	At–large	2013
10	Stanford	Pac-12	21–12	37	At–large	2008
11	Dayton	Atlantic 10	23–10	41	At–large	2009
12	Stephen F. Austin	Southland	31–2	50	Automatic	2009
13	Tulsa	C-USA	21–12	52	Automatic	2003
14	Western Michigan	MAC	23–9	55	Automatic	2004
15	Eastern Kentucky	Ohio Valley	24–9	59	Automatic	2007
16*	Albany	America East	18–14	66	Automatic	2013
16*	Mount St. Mary's	Northeast	16–16	65	Automatic	2008

West Region – Honda Center, Anaheim, California
Seed	School	Conference	Record	Overall Seed	Berth type	Last bid
1	Arizona	Pac-12	30–4	2	At–large	2013
2	Wisconsin	Big Ten	26–7	8	At–large	2013
3	Creighton	Big East	26–7	11	At–large	2013
4	San Diego State	Mountain West	29–4	16	At–large	2013
5	Oklahoma	Big 12	23–9	20	At–large	2013
6	Baylor	Big 12	24–11	24	At–large	2012
7	Oregon	Pac-12	23–9	27	At–large	2013
8	Gonzaga	West Coast	28–6	30	Automatic	2013
9	Oklahoma State	Big 12	21–12	35	At–large	2013
10	BYU	West Coast	23–11	39	At–large	2012
11	Nebraska	Big Ten	19–12	42	At–large	1998
12	North Dakota State	Summit	25–6	48	Automatic	2009
13	New Mexico State	WAC	26–9	53	Automatic	2013
14	Louisiana-Lafayette	Sun Belt	23–11	57	Automatic	2000
15	American	Patriot	20–12	62	Automatic	2009
16	Weber State	Big Sky	19–11	64	Automatic	2007

East Region – Madison Square Garden, New York City, New York
Seed	School	Conference	Record	Overall Seed	Berth type	Last bid
1	Virginia	ACC	28–6	4	Automatic	2012
2	Villanova	Big East	28–4	5	At-Large	2013
3	Iowa State	Big 12	26–7	12	Automatic	2013
4	Michigan State	Big Ten	26–8	14	Automatic	2013
5	Cincinnati	American	27–6	17	At-Large	2013
6	North Carolina	ACC	23–9	21	At-Large	2013
7	UConn	American	26–8	26	At-Large	2012
8	Memphis	American	23–9	31	At-Large	2013
9	George Washington	Atlantic 10	24–8	34	At-Large	2007
10	Saint Joseph's	Atlantic 10	24–9	38	Automatic	2008
11	Providence	Big East	23–11	43	Automatic	2004
12	Harvard	Ivy	26–4	49	Automatic	2013
13	Delaware	Colonial	25–9	54	Automatic	1999
14	North Carolina Central	MEAC	28–5	58	Automatic	Never
15	Milwaukee	Horizon	21–13	60	Automatic	2006
16	Coastal Carolina	Big South	21–12	63	Automatic	1993

Midwest Region – Lucas Oil Stadium, Indianapolis, Indiana
Seed	School	Conference	Record	Overall Seed	Berth type	Last bid
1	Wichita State	MVC	34–0	3	Automatic	2013
2	Michigan	Big Ten	25–8	6	At–large	2013
3	Duke	ACC	26–8	9	At–large	2013
4	Louisville	American	29–5	13	Automatic	2013
5	Saint Louis	Atlantic 10	26–6	18	At–large	2013
6	Massachusetts	Atlantic 10	24–8	23	At–large	1998
7	Texas	Big 12	23–10	25	At–large	2012
8	Kentucky	SEC	24–10	29	At–large	2012
9	Kansas State	Big 12	20–12	33	At–large	2013
10	Arizona State	Pac-12	21–11	40	At–large	2009
11*	Iowa	Big Ten	20–12	45	At–large	2006
11*	Tennessee	SEC	21–12	44	At–large	2011
12*	NC State	ACC	21–13	47	At–large	2013
12*	Xavier	Big East	21–12	46	At–large	2012
13	Manhattan	MAAC	25–7	51	Automatic	2004
14	Mercer	Atlantic Sun	26–8	56	Automatic	1985
15	Wofford	Southern	20–12	61	Automatic	2011
16*	Cal Poly	Big West	13–19	68	Automatic	Never
16*	Texas Southern	SWAC	19–14	67	Automatic	2003

*See First Four

Florida was the overall 1 seed for the second time, the other being 2007 when they repeated as national champions. Arizona was a 1 seed for the 6th time in school history. They lost in the West regional final for the 3rd straight time as a 1 seed, all games being played in Anaheim (also in 1998 and 2003). Virginia was a 1 seed for the 4th time in school history, their first since three straight 1 seeds in 1981, 1982, and 1983.

== Bracket ==
Unless otherwise noted, all times listed are Eastern Daylight Time (UTC-04)

=== First Four – Dayton, Ohio ===
The First Four games involved eight teams: the four overall lowest-ranked teams, and the four lowest-ranked at-large teams.

March 18 – Midwest Region
12	NC State	74
12	Xavier	59

March 18 – South Region
16	Albany	71
16	Mount St. Mary's	64

March 19 – Midwest Region
11	Iowa	65
11	Tennessee	78^{OT}

March 19 – Midwest Region
16	Cal Poly	81
16	Texas Southern	69

=== South Regional – Memphis, Tennessee ===
First round Round of 64; March 20–21
1	Florida	67
16	Albany	55
Orlando – Thu/Sat
8	Colorado	48
9	Pittsburgh	77
5	VCU	75
12	Stephen F. Austin	77^{OT}
San Diego – Fri/Sun
4	UCLA	76
13	Tulsa	59
6	Ohio State	59
11	Dayton	60
Buffalo – Thu/Sat
3	Syracuse	77
14	Western Michigan	53
7	New Mexico	53
10	Stanford	58
St. Louis – Fri/Sun
2	Kansas	80
15	Eastern Kentucky	69

Second round Round of 32; March 22–23
1	Florida	61
9	Pittsburgh	45
12	Stephen F. Austin	60
4	UCLA	77
11	Dayton	55
3	Syracuse	53
10	Stanford	60
2	Kansas	57

Regional semifinals Sweet 16; March 27
1	Florida	79
4	UCLA	68
11	Dayton	82
10	Stanford	72

Regional finals Elite 8 March 29
1	Florida	62
11	Dayton	52

==== Regional Final summary ====
TBS

Saturday, March 29
5:09 pm CT

box score

#11 Dayton Flyers 52, #1 Florida Gators 62
Scoring by half: 24–38, 28–24
Pts: D. Pierre – 18; Rebs: M. Kavanaugh – 8 Asts: D. Pierre – 5	Pts: S. Wilbekin – 23; Rebs: D. Finney-Smith – 9 Asts: K. Hill, S. Wilbekin – 3

FedEx Forum – Memphis, TN
Attendance: 15,443
Referees: Mike Stuart, Pat Driscoll, Doug Shows

==== South Regional all-tournament team ====
Regional all-tournament team: Michael Frazier II, Florida; Devin Oliver, Dayton; Dyshawn Pierre, Dayton; Dwight Powell, Stanford

Regional most outstanding player: Scottie Wilbekin, Florida

=== East Regional – New York City, New York ===
First round Round of 64; March 20–21
1	Virginia	70
16	Coastal Carolina	59
Raleigh – Fri/Sun
8	Memphis	71
9	George Washington	66
5	Cincinnati	57
12	Harvard	61
Spokane – Thu/Sat
4	Michigan State	93
13	Delaware	78
6	North Carolina	79
11	Providence	77
San Antonio – Fri/Sun
3	Iowa State	93
14	NC Central	75
7	UConn	89^{OT}
10	Saint Joseph's	81
Buffalo – Thu/Sat
2	Villanova	73
15	Milwaukee	53

Second round Round of 32; March 22–23
1	Virginia	78
8	Memphis	60
12	Harvard	73
4	Michigan State	80
6	North Carolina	83
3	Iowa State	85
7	UConn	77
2	Villanova	65

Regional semifinals Sweet 16; March 28
1	Virginia	59
4	Michigan State	61
3	Iowa State	76
7	UConn	81

Regional finals Elite 8 March 30
4	Michigan State	54
7	UConn	60

==== Regional Final summary ====
CBS

Sunday, March 30
2:20 pm ET

box score

#7 UConn Huskies 60, #4 Michigan State Spartans 54
Scoring by half: 21–25, 39–29
Pts: S. Napier – 25; Rebs: D. Daniels – 8 Asts: S. Napier – 4	Pts: G. Harris – 22; Rebs: A. Payne – 9 Asts: A. Payne – 3

Madison Square Garden – New York City, NY
Attendance: 19,499
Referees: Tom Eades, John Higgins, Michael Roberts

==== East Regional all-tournament team ====
Regional all-tournament team: DeAndre Daniels, UConn; Gary Harris, Michigan State; Dustin Hogue, Iowa State; Adreian Payne, Michigan State

Regional most outstanding player: Shabazz Napier, UConn

=== West Regional – Anaheim, California ===
First round Round of 64; March 20–21
1	Arizona	68
16	Weber State	59
San Diego – Fri/Sun
8	Gonzaga	85
9	Oklahoma State	77
5	Oklahoma	75
12	North Dakota State	80^{OT}
Spokane – Thu/Sat
4	San Diego State	73^{OT}
13	New Mexico State	69
6	Baylor	74
11	Nebraska	60
San Antonio – Fri/Sun
3	Creighton	76
14	Louisiana–Lafayette	66
7	Oregon	87
10	BYU	68
Milwaukee – Thu/Sat
2	Wisconsin	75
15	American	35

Second round Round of 32; March 22–23
1	Arizona	84
8	Gonzaga	61
12	North Dakota State	44
4	San Diego State	63
6	Baylor	85
3	Creighton	55
7	Oregon	77
2	Wisconsin	85

Regional semifinals Sweet 16; March 27
1	Arizona	70
4	San Diego State	64
6	Baylor	52
2	Wisconsin	69

Regional finals Elite 8 March 29
1	Arizona	63
2	Wisconsin	64^{OT}

==== Regional Final summary ====
TBS

Saturday, March 29
5:49 pm PT

box score

#2 Wisconsin Badgers 64, #1 Arizona Wildcats 63 (OT)
Scoring by half: 25–28, 29–26 Overtime: 10–9
Pts: F. Kaminsky III – 28; Rebs: F. Kaminsky III – 11; Asts: T. Jackson – 5	Pts: N. Johnson – 16; Rebs: A. Gordon – 18; Asts: N. Johnson – 3

Honda Center – Anaheim, CA
Attendance: 17,814
Referees: Bryan Kersey, Tony Greene, Mike Eades

==== West Regional all-tournament team ====
Regional all-tournament team: Aaron Gordon, Arizona; Traevon Jackson, Wisconsin; Nick Johnson, Arizona; Xavier Thames, San Diego State

Regional most outstanding player: Frank Kaminsky, Wisconsin

=== Midwest Regional – Indianapolis, Indiana ===
First round Round of 64; March 20–21
1	Wichita State	64
16	Cal Poly	37
St. Louis – Fri/Sun
8	Kentucky	56
9	Kansas State	49
5	Saint Louis	83^{OT}
12	NC State	80
Orlando – Thu/Sat
4	~~Louisville~~	71
13	Manhattan	64
6	Massachusetts	67
11	Tennessee	86
Raleigh – Fri/Sun
3	Duke	71
14	Mercer	78
7	Texas	87
10	Arizona State	85
Milwaukee – Thu/Sat
2	Michigan	57
15	Wofford	40

Second round Round of 32; March 22–23
1	Wichita State	76
8	Kentucky	78
5	Saint Louis	51
4	~~Louisville~~	66
11	Tennessee	83
14	Mercer	63
7	Texas	65
2	Michigan	79

Regional semifinals Sweet 16; March 28
8	Kentucky	74
4	~~Louisville~~	69
11	Tennessee	71
2	Michigan	73

Regional finals Elite 8 March 30
8	Kentucky	75
2	Michigan	72

On February 20, 2018, the NCAA announced that the wins and records for Louisville's 2011–12, 2012–13, 2013–14, and 2014–15 seasons were vacated due to the sex scandal at Louisville. Unlike forfeiture, a vacated game does not result in the other school being credited with a win, only with Louisville removing the wins from its own record.

==== Regional Final summary ====
CBS

Sunday, March 30
5:05 pm ET

box score

#8 Kentucky Wildcats 75, #2 Michigan Wolverines 72
Scoring by half: 37–37, 38–35
Pts: J. Randle – 16; Rebs: J. Randle – 11; Asts: A. Harrison – 6	Pts: N. Stauskas – 24; Rebs: J. Morgan, G. Robinson III – 4 Asts: C. LeVert – 5

Lucas Oil Stadium – Indianapolis, IN
Attendance: 35,551
Referees: Ed Corbett, Don Daily, Randall McCall

==== Midwest Regional all-tournament team ====
Regional all-tournament team: Aaron Harrison, Kentucky; Marcus Lee, Kentucky; Caris LeVert, Michigan; Nik Stauskas, Michigan

Regional most outstanding player: Julius Randle, Kentucky

== Final Four ==
During the Final Four round, regardless of the seeds of the participating teams, the champion of the top overall top seed's region plays against the champion of the fourth-ranked top seed's region, and the champion of the second overall top seed's region plays against the champion of the third-ranked top seed's region. Florida (placed in the South Regional) was selected as the top overall seed, and Virginia (in the East Regional) was named as the No. 4 overall seed. Thus, the South champion (Florida) played the East Champion (UConn) in one semifinal game, and the West Champion (Wisconsin) faced the Midwest Champion (Kentucky) in the other semifinal game. The overall No. 1 seed Florida lost only two games during the regular season: to West Champion Wisconsin and to East Champion (and eventual National Champion) UConn; Florida also played and beat Midwest Champion Kentucky twice during the regular season and again in the conference championship game.

=== Final Four – AT&T Stadium, Arlington, Texas ===
National Semifinals; Final Four; Saturday, April 5
MW8	Kentucky	74
W2	Wisconsin	73
E7	UConn	63
S1	Florida	53

National Championship Game; Monday, April 7
MW8	Kentucky	54
E7	UConn	60

=== Game summaries ===
==== Final four ====
TBS
TNT
truTV

Saturday, April 5
5:15 pm CT

Recap

E7 UConn Huskies 63, S1 Florida Gators 53
Scoring by half: 25–22, 38–31
Pts: D. Daniels – 20; Rebs: D. Daniels – 10; Asts: S. Napier – 6	Pts: P. Young – 19; Rebs: C. Prather – 6 Asts: S. Wilbekin, C. Prather, D. Finney-Smith – 1

AT&T Stadium – Arlington, TX
Attendance: 79,444
Referees: John Higgins, Michael Stephens, Doug Simmons

TBS
TNT
truTV

Saturday, April 5
8:12 pm CT

Recap

MW8 Kentucky Wildcats 74, W2 Wisconsin Badgers 73
Scoring by half: 36–40, 38–33
Pts: J. Young – 17; Rebs: D. Johnson, A. Poythress – 7 Asts: A. Harrison – 4	Pts: B. Brust, S. Dekker – 15; Rebs: J. Gasser, F. Kaminsky III – 5 Asts: T. Jackson, J. Gasser – 3

AT&T Stadium – Arlington, TX
Attendance: 79,444
Referees: Mike Stuart, Pat Adams, Terry Wymer

==== National Championship ====
CBS

Monday, April 7
8:10 pm CT

Recap

#8 Kentucky Wildcats 54, #7 UConn Huskies 60
Scoring by half: 31–35, 23–25
Pts: J. Young – 22; Rebs: J. Young – 7 Asts: A. Harrison – 5	Pts: S. Napier – 22; Rebs: L. Kromah, D. Daniels, S. Napier – 6 Asts: R. Boatright, S. Napier – 3

AT&T Stadium – Arlington, TX
Attendance: 79,238
Referees: Verne Harris, Doug Shows, Joe DeRosa

==== Final Four all-tournament team ====
- Julius Randle, Kentucky
- James Young, Kentucky
- Ryan Boatright, UConn
- DeAndre Daniels, UConn
- Shabazz Napier, UConn, Most Outstanding Player

== Tournament notes ==
Wichita State became the first team since UNLV in 1991 to go into the tournament undefeated. The Shockers entered the tournament 34–0. Their perfect record of 35–0 (a then NCAA men's record) was spoiled by Kentucky in the second round. Kentucky in turn set an NCAA-men's-record 38 straight wins to start a season the next year.

Kentucky became the first team to field all-freshman starters at the Final Four and championship games since the 1991–92 Michigan Wolverines under the Fab Five. The 1992 Final Four and championship appearances by Michigan were subsequently vacated.

MEAC champion North Carolina Central University and Big West champion Cal Poly made their first NCAA Division I tournament appearances.

For only the second time since 1973 no teams from the state of Indiana (a state noted for its basketball powerhouse programs) were in the tournament.

There were five overtime games in the second round of the tournament, the most overtime games ever in tournament history. In contrast, the previous two tournaments had two overtime games combined.

North Dakota State's victory against Oklahoma secured the first tournament win for the state of North Dakota. Mercer, Stephen F. Austin, Albany, and Cal Poly had their first NCAA tournament wins. Cal Poly's victory over Texas Southern marked only the third time a team with a losing record won a game in the tournament.

=== Upsets ===
Per the NCAA, "Upsets are defined as when the winner of the game was seeded five or more places lower than the team it defeated."

The 2014 tournament saw a total of 13 upsets, with six in the first round, four in the second round, one in the Elite Eight, and two in the Final Four.

Upsets in the 2014 NCAA Division I men's basketball tournament
Round	South	East	West	Midwest
Round of 64	No. 12 Stephen F. Austin defeated No. 5 VCU, 77–75 ^{OT}; No. 11 Dayton defeated No. 6 Ohio State, 60–59	No. 12 Harvard defeated No. 5 Cincinnati, 61–57	No. 12 North Dakota State defeated No. 5 Oklahoma, 80–75 ^{OT}	No. 14 Mercer defeated No. 3 Duke, 78–71; No. 11 Tennessee defeated No. 6 Massachusetts, 86–67
Round of 32	No. 11 Dayton defeated No. 3 Syracuse, 55–53; No. 10 Stanford defeated No. 2 Kansas, 60–57	No. 7 UConn defeated No. 2 Villanova, 77–65	None	No. 8 Kentucky defeated No. 1 Wichita State, 78–76
Sweet 16	None			
Elite 8	None			No. 8 Kentucky defeated No. 2 Michigan, 75–72
Final 4	No. 7 UConn defeated No. 1 Florida, 63–53; No. 8 Kentucky defeated No. 2 Wisconsin, 74–73			
National Championship	None			

== Record by conference ==
Conference	Bids	Record	Win %	R64	R32	S16	E8	F4	CG	NC
American	4	9–3	.750	4	3	2	1	1	1	1
SEC	3	12–3	.800	3	3	3	2	2	1	–
Big Ten	6	10–6	.625	5	3	3	3	1	–	–
Pac-12	6	8–6	.571	6	4	3	1	–	–	–
Atlantic 10	6	4–6	.400	6	2	1	1	–	–	–
Big 12	7	6–7	.462	7	4	2	–	–	–	–
ACC	6	6–6	.500	6	4	1	–	–	–	–
Mountain West	2	2–2	.500	2	1	1	–	–	–	–
Big East	4	2–4	.333	3	2	–	–	–	–	–
WCC	2	1–2	.333	2	1	–	–	–	–	–
Atlantic Sun	1	1–1	.500	1	1	–	–	–	–	–
Ivy	1	1–1	.500	1	1	–	–	–	–	–
MVC	1	1–1	.500	1	1	–	–	–	–	–
Southland	1	1–1	.500	1	1	–	–	–	–	–
Summit	1	1–1	.500	1	1	–	–	–	–	–
America East	1	1–1	.500	1	–	–	–	–	–	–
Big West	1	1–1	.500	1	–	–	–	–	–	–

- The R64, R32, S16, E8, F4, CG, and NC columns indicate how many teams from each conference were in the round of 64 (second round), round of 32 (third round), Sweet 16, Elite Eight, Final Four, championship game, and national champion, respectively.
- The "Record" column includes wins in the first round (First Four) for ACC, America East, Big West, and SEC.
- The "Record" column also includes losses in the first round (First Four) for Big East and Big 10.
- The SWAC and NEC each had one representative, eliminated in the first round with a record of 0–1.
- The MAAC, OVC, WAC, Patriot League, Colonial, Sun Belt, Big Sky, Horizon League, Big South, Southern Conference, MAC, C-USA, and MEAC each had one representative, eliminated in the second round with a record of 0–1.

== Media coverage ==
=== Television ===
The year 2014 marked the fourth year of a 14-year partnership between CBS and Turner cable networks TBS, TNT and truTV to cover the entire tournament under the NCAA March Madness banner. TBS aired the Final Four for the first year since CBS' 32 consecutive years of airing. The tournament was considered a ratings success. Tournament games averaged 10.5 million viewers, and the championship game garnered an average of 21.2 million viewers and a peak viewership of 24.3 million.

- First Four – truTV
- Second and third rounds – CBS, TBS, TNT, and truTV
- Regional semifinals and Finals (Sweet Sixteen and Elite Eight) – CBS and TBS
- National semifinals (Final Four) – TBS, TNT, truTV
  - TBS provided traditional coverage; TNT and truTV each gave team-specific broadcasts.
- National Championship – CBS

==== Studio hosts ====
- Greg Gumbel (New York City and Arlington) – second round, third round, regionals, Final Four and national championship game
- Ernie Johnson Jr. (New York City, Atlanta and Arlington) – second round, third round, regional semi-finals, Final Four and national championship game
- Matt Winer (Atlanta) – First Four, second round and third round

==== Studio analysts ====
- Charles Barkley (New York City and Arlington) – second round, third round, regionals, Final Four and national championship game
- Mateen Cleaves (New York City) – third round
- Seth Davis (Atlanta and Arlington) – First Four, second round, third round, regional semi-finals, Final Four and national championship game
- Doug Gottlieb (Atlanta) – regional semi-finals
- Grant Hill (Atlanta and Arlington) – First Four, second round, third round, regional semi-finals, Final Four and national championship game
- Clark Kellogg (New York City and Arlington) – second round, third round, regionals, Final Four and national championship game
- Reggie Miller (Arlington) – Final Four
- Kenny Smith (New York City and Arlington) – second round, third round, regionals, Final Four and national championship game
- Steve Smith (Atlanta) – First Four, second round, third round and regional semi-finals
- Buzz Williams (New York City) – third round

==== Commentary teams ====
- Jim Nantz/Greg Anthony/Steve Kerr/Tracy Wolfson – Second and third round at St. Louis, Missouri; Midwest Regional at Indianapolis, Indiana; Final Four at Arlington, Texas
  Kerr joined Nantz and Anthony during the Final Four and national championship games
- Marv Albert/Steve Kerr/Craig Sager – Second and third round at San Antonio, Texas; West Regional at Anaheim, California
- Verne Lundquist/Bill Raftery/Allie LaForce – Second and third round at Buffalo, New York; East Regional at New York City, New York
- Kevin Harlan/Len Elmore/Reggie Miller/Rachel Nichols – First Four at Dayton, Ohio; Second and third round at Raleigh, North Carolina; South Regional at Memphis, Tennessee
- Ian Eagle/Jim Spanarkel/Lewis Johnson – Second and third round at Milwaukee, Wisconsin
- Brian Anderson/Dan Bonner/Kristine Leahy – First Four at Dayton, Ohio; Second and third round at Orlando, Florida
- Spero Dedes/Doug Gottlieb/Jaime Maggio – Second and third round at Spokane, Washington
- Andrew Catalon/Mike Gminski/Otis Livingston – Second and third round at San Diego, California

===== Team casts =====
For the first time in the history of the tournament, Turner broadcast the semifinals. TBS aired the traditional neutral broadcast (with Nantz/Anthony/Kerr/Wolfson commentator set that is also being used for CBS's national championship coverage). However, Turner also distributed team-centered broadcasts for the Final Four broadcasts on TNT and truTV. The announcers for these broadcasts are as follows:

- David Steele/Mark Wise/James Bates – Florida Teamcast on TNT
- Eric Frede/Donny Marshall/Swin Cash – UConn Teamcast on truTV
- Rob Bromley/Rex Chapman/Dave Baker – Kentucky Teamcast on TNT
- Wayne Larrivee/Mike Kelley/Phil Dawson – Wisconsin Teamcast on truTV

=== International ===
ESPN International distributes broadcast rights to the tournament outside the United States, and will produce separate international broadcasts of the semi-final and championship games with announcers Dan Shulman (play-by-play), Dick Vitale (analyst for the final and one semi-final), and Jay Bilas (analyst for the other semi-final). For the initial rounds, they use CBS/Turner coverage with an additional host to transition between games, with whiparound coverage similar to the CBS-only era. ESPN also has exclusive digital rights to the NCAA tournament outside of North America.

In Canada, the broadcasting rights are with TSN. In The Philippines it's aired on TV5.

=== Radio ===
Westwood One has exclusive national radio rights to the entire tournament. Team radio networks also hold the rights to broadcast their teams through their entire progression within the tournament and no flagship restrictions. However men's team radio networks cannot stream the games online during the NCAA tournament. WestwoodOne is the only group authorized to stream the tournament online.

==== First Four ====
- John Tautges and Kyle Macy – at Dayton, Ohio

==== Second and Third rounds ====
- Gary Cohen and Kevin Grevey – Buffalo, New York
- Wayne Larrivee and Kelly Tripucka – Milwaukee, Wisconsin
- Tom McCarthy and Donny Marshall – Orlando, Florida
- Ted Robinson and P. J. Carlesimo – Spokane, Washington
- Scott Graham and John Thompson – Raleigh, North Carolina
- Brad Sham and Will Perdue – San Antonio, Texas
- Dave Sims and Bill Frieder – San Diego, California
- Kevin Kugler and Jim Jackson – St. Louis, Missouri

==== Regionals ====
- Ian Eagle and John Thompson – East Regional at New York City, New York
- Kevin Kugler and P. J. Carlesimo – Midwest Regional at Indianapolis, Indiana
- Gary Cohen and Will Perdue – South Regional at Memphis, Tennessee
- Ted Robinson and Bill Frieder – West Regional at Anaheim, California

==== Final four ====
- Kevin Kugler, John Thompson, Bill Raftery, and Jim Gray – Arlington, Texas

== See also ==
- 2014 NCAA Division II men's basketball tournament
- 2014 NCAA Division III men's basketball tournament
- 2014 NCAA Division I women's basketball tournament
- 2014 NCAA Division II women's basketball tournament
- 2014 NCAA Division III women's basketball tournament
- 2014 National Invitation Tournament
- 2014 Women's National Invitation Tournament
- 2014 NAIA Division I men's basketball tournament
- 2014 NAIA Division II men's basketball tournament
- 2014 College Basketball Invitational
- 2014 CollegeInsider.com Postseason Tournament
