= Josh Gasser =

American basketball player (born 1992)

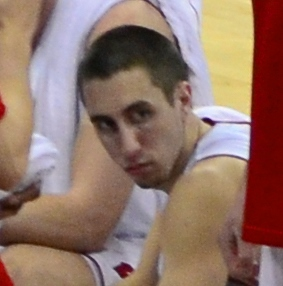
- Gasser in 2012

Personal information
- Born: February 13, 1992 (age 34) Port Washington, Wisconsin, U.S.
- Listed height: 6 ft 4 in (1.93 m)
- Listed weight: 192 lb (87 kg)

Career information
- High school: Port Washington (Port Washington, Wisconsin)
- College: Wisconsin (2010–2015)
- NBA draft: 2015: undrafted
- Playing career: 2015–2016
- Position: Guard

Career history
- 2015–2016: Löwen Braunschweig

Career highlights
- 3× Big Ten All–Defensive team (2012, 2014, 2015); Wisconsin Gatorade Player of the Year (2010)

Joshua Patrick Gasser (born February 13, 1992) is an American former basketball player. He played college basketball for the Wisconsin Badgers. Gasser is one of only two players in UW history to record a triple-double in a game. He played professionally for Löwen Braunschweig of Germany's Basketball Bundesliga.

== Early life ==
Gasser attended Port Washington High School in Port Washington, Wisconsin. As a junior, he averaged 22 points, 11 rebounds and 3 assists per game, earning conference MVP honors.

As a senior, Gasser averaged 23.9 points, 9.6 rebounds and 4.8 assists, earning AP first-team all-state and was named Wisconsin Gatorade Player of the Year. He is Port Washington's all-time leading scorer, rebounder and holds the free-throw percentage record.

College recruiting
Name	Hometown	School	Height	Weight	Commit date
Josh Gasser; G	Port Washington, WI	Port Washington HS	6 ft 4 in (1.93 m)	195 lb (88 kg)	Sep 24, 2009
Josh Gasser; G	Recruit ratings: Scout: Rivals: 247Sports: ESPN:				
Overall recruit ranking: Scout: 44 (PG) Rivals: N/A ESPN: 49 (PG)
Note: In many cases, Scout, Rivals, 247Sports, On3, and ESPN may conflict in their listings of height and weight.; In these cases, the average was taken. ESPN grades are on a 100-point scale.; Sources: "2010 Team Ranking". Rivals.

== College career ==
On November 11, 2010, Josh Gasser made his collegiate debut coming off the bench scoring 21 points, and grabbing 9 rebounds against Prairie View A&M. Following his impressive performance, Bo Ryan would insert Gasser into the starting line-up, a spot that he would keep for his entire career. On January 23, 2011, Wisconsin defeated Northwestern by a score of 78–46. He recorded 10 points, 12 rebounds, and 10 assists for the first triple-double in Wisconsin history. Gasser would help the Badgers reach the sweet 16 in 2011.

In Gasser's sophomore campaign he averaged 7.7 points per game while shooting 46% from the field, and 45% from the three. He also averaged 4.2 rebounds per game. Gasser lead the 2011–12 Wisconsin Badgers to the sweet 16.

Going into his junior season, Gasser tore his ACL in practice and missed the entire 2012–13 season.

Following Josh Gasser's redshirt season, he was an honorable mention all-Big Ten selection by the media as a (RS) Junior. Gasser would go on to lead the Badgers to back-to-back final four's in 2014 and 2015. Gasser was considered one of the top defensive players in the Big Ten while he played for the Badgers and was named to the Big Ten's All-Defensive team in his sophomore, junior and senior seasons.

Gasser finished as the Badgers all-time wins leader and achieved a 13–4 career record in the NCAA Tournament.

=== Statistics ===
Year	Team	GP	GS	MPG	FG%	3P%	FT%	RPG	APG	SPG	BPG	PPG
2010–11	Wisconsin	34	30	28.1	.472	.302	.855	3.9	2.2	0.5	0.1	5.9
2011–12	Wisconsin	36	36	34.1	.464	.452	.783	4.2	1.9	0.7	0.1	7.6
2012–13	Wisconsin	Redshirt – Injured										
2013–14	Wisconsin	38	38	33.4	.433	.431	.868	4.0	1.9	0.7	0.2	8.8
2014–15	Wisconsin	40	40	33.0	.443	.389	.827	3.5	1.8	0.8	0.2	6.6
Career		148	144	32.3	.452	.402	.837	3.9	1.9	0.7	0.1	7.3

== Professional career ==
On June 27, 2015, Gasser signed a Summer league contract with the Brooklyn Nets. About a month later, he signed an annual contract with Löwen Braunschweig of the Basketball Bundesliga. Gasser averaged 6.6 points per game, 1.6 assists per game and 2.8 rebounds per game.

== Personal life ==
Gasser is the son of Pat and Joan Gasser. He earned a degree in Business Marketing.
