= Gary Close =

American basketball coach

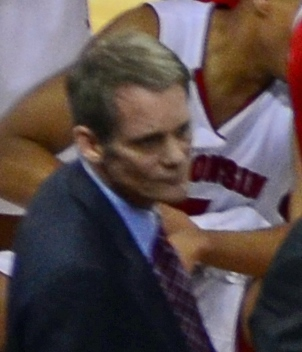
- Gary Close in 2012.

Biographical details
- Born: 1957 (age 68–69); Moorestown Township, New Jersey
- Education: Arizona State University

Coaching career (HC unless noted)
- 1983–1986: Stanford (asst.)
- 1986–1999: Iowa (asst.)
- 2000–2003: Regina HS
- 2003–2016: Wisconsin (asst.)

Gary E. Close (born 1957) is an American former basketball coach.

== Biography ==
A native of Moorestown Township, New Jersey, Close is married with two children (Sam Close & Ellen Close) . Close is a graduate of Arizona State University. He resides in Middleton, Wisconsin.

== Career ==
Close was an assistant coach with the Stanford Cardinal and the Iowa Hawkeyes before taking a head coaching position at Regina High School in Iowa City, Iowa. He joined the Wisconsin Badgers as an assistant coach in 2003. He resigned his position on March 30, 2016, after 13 years with the team. He has been a part of 2 Big Ten Regular Season Championships, 3 Big Ten tournament championships, 22 NCAA Tournaments, and 2 Final Fours.
