= Marquette–Wisconsin men's basketball rivalry =

American college basketball rivalry

- Marquette Golden Eagles Wisconsin Badgers
- First meeting: December 19, 1917; Wisconsin 15, Marquette 14
- Latest meeting: December 6, 2025; Wisconsin 96, Marquette 76

Statistics
- Total meetings: 132
- All-time series: Wisconsin leads, 72–60
- Largest victory: Marquette, 94–64 (1982)
- Longest win streak: Marquette, 15 (1969–1978)
- Current win streak: Wisconsin, 1 (2025–present)

Locations of Marquette and Wisconsin

The Marquette–Wisconsin men's basketball rivalry is an intercollegiate basketball rivalry between the Marquette Golden Eagles and Wisconsin Badgers. The rivalry series is between the two major college athletics programs in the state of Wisconsin and is known as the I-94 Rivalry, given the 78 miles along the highway separating the two schools. The game was ranked the 16th-best among college basketball programs in 2013 and 13th in 2020. The series is the second most-played for the Golden Eagles, only trailing its series with DePaul. In turn, Marquette is Wisconsin's most-played non-conference opponent. Marquette and Wisconsin have met 131 times and has been played annually since 1958. As of 2025, the series is led by Wisconsin, which holds a 72–60 advantage. Since the 1949–50 season, the total point differential has only been 34, signifying the relative competitiveness of the series. Both programs are in the top-50 for all-time Division I basketball victories.

== Series history ==
Under head coach Al McGuire, Marquette dominated the 1970s as the program became a national powerhouse, including a series-record 15 straight victories from 1969 to 1978 that inflamed tensions to their then-high. During the stretch, Marquette was ranked in the Top 12 for all but one year, while the Badgers entered unranked each season. One of the most memorable games occurred in 1974, as the Golden Eagles' Maurice Lucas hit a 20-foot jumpshot as time expired to lift Marquette to a 59–58 victory. In celebration, McGuire jumped onto the scorer's table and raised his fists as Badgers coach John Powless walked away dejectedly. The moment was captured in a famous photograph by Robert "Buck" Miller.

Wisconsin finally snapped the streak in 1978 after McGuire retired, flipping the narrative on the series after a 65 to 52 victory. Coming into the game, Marquette had won 25 of the last 40 matchups; since, the Badgers have compiled a 25–19 record. In the most recent meeting on December 6th, 2025, the Badgers defeated the Golden Eagles in Madison 96–76 behind 30 points from John Blackwell, marking the Badgers' fourth victory in the previous five meetings.

== Rival accomplishments ==
The following summarizes the accomplishments of the two programs.

| Team | Marquette Golden Eagles | Wisconsin Badgers |
|---|---|---|
| NCAA National Titles | 1 | 1 |
| NCAA Final Four Appearances | 3 | 4 |
| NCAA Tournament Appearances | 33 | 26 |
| NCAA Tournament Record | 41–34 | 41–26 |
| Conference Tournament Titles | 1 | 3 |
| Conference Championships | 3 | 20 |
| Consensus First Team All-Americans | 4 | 21 |
| Naismith Players of the Year | 1 | 1 |
| All-time Program Record | 1651–1018 | 1638–1220 |
| All-time Winning Percentage | .619 | .573 |

== Game results ==
| Marquette victories | Wisconsin victories | Tie games |

| No. | Date | Location | Winner | Score |
|---|---|---|---|---|
| 1 | December 19, 1917 | Madison, WI | Wisconsin | 15–14 |
| 2 | December 18, 1920 | Milwaukee, WI | Wisconsin | 23–18 |
| 3 | January 3, 1923 | Madison, WI | Marquette | 9–8 |
| 4 | December 19, 1923 | Milwaukee, WI | Wisconsin | 27–7 |
| 5 | December 18, 1925 | Milwaukee, WI | Wisconsin | 42–26 |
| 6 | December 22, 1926 | Milwaukee, WI | Wisconsin | 29–26 |
| 7 | February 11, 1930 | Madison, WI | Wisconsin | 29–15 |
| 8 | February 13, 1930 | Milwaukee, WI | Wisconsin | 29–22 |
| 9 | December 30, 1930 | Milwaukee, WI | Marquette | 16–14 |
| 10 | December 21, 1931 | Milwaukee, WI | Marquette | 26–23 |
| 11 | January 20, 1932 | Madison, WI | Wisconsin | 18–16 |
| 12 | December 17, 1932 | Madison, WI | Marquette | 18–16 |
| 13 | January 3, 1933 | Milwaukee, WI | Marquette | 22–16 |
| 14 | December 16, 1933 | Madison, WI | Wisconsin | 32–30 |
| 15 | January 2, 1934 | Milwaukee, WI | Marquette | 28–26 |
| 16 | December 15, 1934 | Madison, WI | Wisconsin | 29–20 |
| 17 | December 22, 1934 | Milwaukee, WI | Marquette | 33–25 |
| 18 | December 14, 1935 | Madison, WI | Wisconsin | 35–22 |
| 19 | December 21, 1935 | Milwaukee, WI | Wisconsin | 46–21 |
| 20 | December 12, 1936 | Madison, WI | Wisconsin | 29–21 |
| 21 | December 19, 1936 | Milwaukee, WI | Wisconsin | 35–29 |
| 22 | December 4, 1937 | Madison, WI | Marquette | 32–21 |
| 23 | December 18, 1937 | Milwaukee, WI | Marquette | 38–32 |
| 24 | December 5, 1938 | Madison, WI | Wisconsin | 27–26 |
| 25 | December 17, 1938 | Milwaukee, WI | Marquette | 46–27 |
| 26 | December 9, 1939 | Madison, WI | Wisconsin | 46–39 |
| 27 | December 16, 1939 | Milwaukee, WI | Marquette | 41–28 |
| 28 | December 7, 1940 | Madison, WI | Wisconsin | 38–32 |
| 29 | December 21, 1940 | Milwaukee, WI | Marquette | 40–30 |
| 30 | December 6, 1941 | Madison, WI | Wisconsin | 35–34 |
| 31 | December 20, 1941 | Milwaukee, WI | Wisconsin | 36–25 |
| 32 | December 5, 1942 | Madison, WI | Wisconsin | 45–36 |
| 33 | December 19, 1942 | Milwaukee, WI | Wisconsin | 50–38 |
| 34 | December 4, 1943 | Madison, WI | Marquette | 51–43 |
| 35 | December 18, 1943 | Milwaukee, WI | Wisconsin | 40–37 |
| 36 | December 9, 1944 | Madison, WI | Wisconsin | 45–40 |
| 37 | December 23, 1944 | Milwaukee, WI | Wisconsin | 46–39 |
| 38 | December 8, 1945 | Madison, WI | Wisconsin | 42–32 |
| 39 | December 22, 1945 | Milwaukee, WI | Marquette | 62–41 |
| 40 | December 7, 1946 | Madison, WI | Wisconsin | 65–51 |
| 41 | December 22, 1946 | Milwaukee, WI | Marquette | 55–47 |
| 42 | December 6, 1947 | Madison, WI | Wisconsin | 57–50 |
| 43 | December 31, 1947 | Milwaukee, WI | Wisconsin | 67–60 |
| 44 | December 4, 1948 | Madison, WI | Wisconsin | 67–63^{OT} |
| 45 | December 31, 1948 | Milwaukee, WI | Wisconsin | 60–34 |

| No. | Date | Location | Winner | Score |
|---|---|---|---|---|
| 46 | December 3, 1949 | Madison, WI | Wisconsin | 63–48 |
| 47 | December 17, 1949 | Milwaukee, WI | Wisconsin | 62–45 |
| 48 | December 2, 1950 | Madison, WI | Wisconsin | 49–42 |
| 49 | December 16, 1950 | Milwaukee, WI | Marquette | 61–58 |
| 50 | December 1, 1951 | Madison, WI | Wisconsin | 48–46 |
| 51 | December 22, 1951 | Milwaukee, WI | Marquette | 51–47 |
| 52 | December 5, 1952 | Madison, WI | Wisconsin | 76–55 |
| 53 | December 4, 1953 | Milwaukee, WI | Wisconsin | 64–56 |
| 54 | December 2, 1958 | Madison, WI | Marquette | 76–47 |
| 55 | December 19, 1959 | Milwaukee, WI | Marquette | 84–66 |
| 56 | December 10, 1960 | Madison, WI | Wisconsin | 55–51 |
| 57 | December 20, 1961 | Milwaukee, WI | Marquette | 92–75 |
| 58 | December 19, 1962 | Madison, WI | Wisconsin | 76–58 |
| 59 | December 29, 1962 | Milwaukee, WI | Wisconsin | 70–56 |
| 60 | January 28, 1964 | Milwaukee, WI | Wisconsin | 72–68 |
| 61 | December 19, 1964 | Milwaukee, WI | Marquette | 62–61 |
| 62 | January 13, 1965 | Madison, WI | Marquette | 59–58 |
| 63 | January 3, 1966 | Milwaukee, WI | Wisconsin | 73–72 |
| 64 | January 4, 1967 | Madison, WI | Marquette | 66–60 |
| 65 | December 16, 1967 | Milwaukee, WI | Wisconsin | 77–65 |
| 66 | January 11, 1968 | Milwaukee, WI | Marquette | 71–56 |
| 67 | December 28, 1968 | Milwaukee, WI | Marquette | 59–56^{OT} |
| 68 | January 28, 1969 | Madison, WI | Wisconsin | 56–50 |
| 69 | December 27, 1969 | Milwaukee, WI | Marquette | 64–43 |
| 70 | January 27, 1970 | Milwaukee, WI | #7 Marquette | 60–51 |
| 71 | December 30, 1970 | Milwaukee, WI | #3 Marquette | 72–69 |
| 72 | February 2, 1971 | Madison, WI | #1 Marquette | 89–75 |
| 73 | January 3, 1972 | Milwaukee, WI | #2 Marquette | 72–60 |
| 74 | December 30, 1972 | Milwaukee, WI | #3 Marquette | 75–73^{2OT} |
| 75 | February 6, 1973 | Madison, WI | #7 Marquette | 64–58 |
| 76 | December 29, 1973 | Milwaukee, WI | #6 Marquette | 49–48^{OT} |
| 77 | February 5, 1974 | Milwaukee, WI | #6 Marquette | 59–58 |
| 78 | February 4, 1975 | Madison, WI | #11 Marquette | 69–63 |
| 79 | December 16, 1975 | Milwaukee, WI | #3 Marquette | 78–54 |
| 80 | December 30, 1975 | Milwaukee, WI | #6 Marquette | 82–66 |
| 81 | December 28, 1976 | Milwaukee, WI | #12 Marquette | 64–57 |
| 82 | February 21, 1977 | Madison, WI | #9 Marquette | 73–58 |
| 83 | February 14, 1978 | Milwaukee, WI | #2 Marquette | 75–64 |
| 84 | December 23, 1978 | Madison, WI | Wisconsin | 65–52 |
| 85 | December 15, 1979 | Milwaukee, WI | Wisconsin | 57–56 |
| 86 | March 10, 1981 | Madison, WI | Marquette | 64–53 |
| 87 | March 9, 1982 | Milwaukee, WI | Marquette | 94–64 |
| 88 | February 17, 1983 | Madison, WI | Marquette | 68–62 |
| 89 | February 16, 1984 | Milwaukee, WI | Marquette | 74–59 |
| 90 | November 30, 1985 | Madison, WI | Wisconsin | 75–74 |

| No. | Date | Location | Winner | Score |
|---|---|---|---|---|
| 91 | December 1, 1986 | Milwaukee, WI | Marquette | 84–71 |
| 92 | December 10, 1987 | Madison, WI | Wisconsin | 66–55 |
| 93 | December 3, 1988 | Milwaukee, WI | Wisconsin | 70–55 |
| 94 | February 22, 1989 | Madison, WI | Wisconsin | 61–50 |
| 95 | December 2, 1989 | Milwaukee, WI | Wisconsin | 63–58^{OT} |
| 96 | February 19, 1990 | Madison, WI | Wisconsin | 82–65 |
| 97 | December 4, 1990 | Milwaukee, WI | Marquette | 69–58 |
| 98 | January 4, 1992 | Madison, WI | Wisconsin | 81–63 |
| 99 | January 2, 1993 | Milwaukee, WI | Wisconsin | 77–67 |
| 100 | January 2, 1994 | Madison, WI | #17 Wisconsin | 71–52 |
| 101 | December 31, 1994 | Milwaukee, WI | Marquette | 80–65 |
| 102 | December 31, 1995 | Madison, WI | Wisconsin | 55–46 |
| 103 | December 31, 1996 | Milwaukee, WI | Marquette | 59–52 |
| 104 | November 14, 1997 | Madison, WI | Marquette | 65–60 |
| 105 | December 23, 1998 | Milwaukee, WI | #20 Wisconsin | 61–45 |
| 106 | December 23, 1999 | Madison, WI | Wisconsin | 86–74 |
| 107 | December 23, 2000 | Madison, WI | #16 Wisconsin | 52–47 |
| 108 | December 22, 2001 | Madison, WI | Wisconsin | 86–73 |
| 109 | December 14, 2002 | Milwaukee, WI | #16 Marquette | 63–54 |
| 110 | December 20, 2003 | Madison, WI | #22 Wisconsin | 63–59 |
| 111 | December 11, 2004 | Milwaukee, WI | Marquette | 63–54 |
| 112 | December 10, 2005 | Madison, WI | Wisconsin | 77–63 |
| 113 | December 9, 2006 | Milwaukee, WI | #11 Wisconsin | 70–66 |
| 114 | December 8, 2007 | Madison, WI | #11 Marquette | 81–76 |
| 115 | December 6, 2008 | Milwaukee, WI | #25 Marquette | 61–58 |
| 116 | December 12, 2009 | Madison, WI | #20 Wisconsin | 72–63 |
| 117 | December 11, 2010 | Milwaukee, WI | Wisconsin | 69–64 |
| 118 | December 3, 2011 | Madison, WI | #16 Marquette | 61–54 |
| 119 | December 8, 2012 | Milwaukee, WI | Marquette | 60–50 |
| 120 | December 7, 2013 | Madison, WI | #8 Wisconsin | 70–64 |
| 121 | December 6, 2014 | Milwaukee, WI | #2 Wisconsin | 49–38 |
| 122 | December 12, 2015 | Madison, WI | Marquette | 57–55 |
| 123 | December 10, 2016 | Milwaukee, WI | #17 Wisconsin | 93–84 |
| 124 | December 9, 2017 | Madison, WI | Marquette | 82–63 |
| 125 | December 8, 2018 | Milwaukee, WI | Marquette | 74–69^{OT} |
| 126 | November 17, 2019 | Madison, WI | Wisconsin | 77–61 |
| 127 | December 4, 2020 | Milwaukee, WI | Marquette | 67–65 |
| 128 | December 4, 2021 | Madison, WI | #23 Wisconsin | 89–76 |
| 129 | December 3, 2022 | Milwaukee, WI | Wisconsin | 80–77^{OT} |
| 130 | December 2, 2023 | Madison, WI | Wisconsin | 75–64 |
| 131 | December 7, 2024 | Milwaukee, WI | #5 Marquette | 88–74 |
| 132 | December 6, 2025 | Madison, WI | Wisconsin | 96–76 |
Series: Wisconsin leads 72–60
