= Ben Brust =

American basketball player

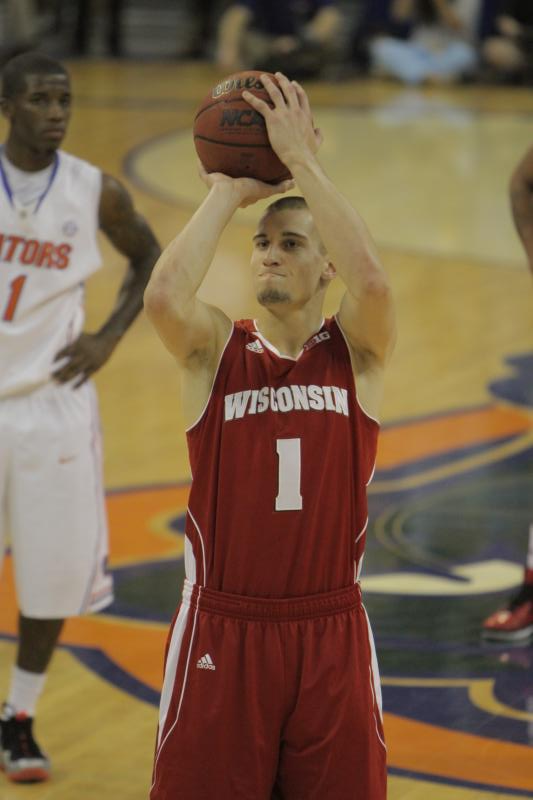
- Brust in 2012

Personal information
- Born: October 3, 1991 (age 35) Arlington Heights, Illinois, U.S.
- Listed height: 6 ft 0 in (1.83 m)
- Listed weight: 196 lb (89 kg)

Career information
- High school: Hersey (Arlington Heights, Illinois); Mundelein (Mundelein, Illinois)
- College: Wisconsin (2010–2014)
- NBA draft: 2014: undrafted
- Playing career: 2014–2015
- Position: Shooting guard / point guard

Career history
- 2014–2015: Pieno žvaigždės

Benjamin John Brust (born October 3, 1991) is an American former professional basketball player who played for the Pieno žvaigždės of the Lithuanian Basketball League (LKL). He played college basketball for the University of Wisconsin–Madison. He was part of the 2013–14 Wisconsin Badgers Final Four team.

== Early life ==
Brust attended John Hersey High School his freshman year in 2006–07, before transferring to Mundelein High School for his sophomore, junior and senior years. As a senior, he averaged 24.6 points, 5.9 rebounds, 5.0 assists and 3.1 steals per game during senior season, topping the 40-point mark on four occasions.

Brust originally committed to University of Iowa, but after a coaching change he reopened his options on where to play, and he ultimately chose the University of Wisconsin–Madison.

College recruiting
Name	Hometown	School	Height	Weight	Commit date
Ben Brust; G	Mundelein, IL	Mundelein HS	6 ft 0 in (1.83 m)	170 lb (77 kg)	May 7, 2010
Ben Brust; G	Recruit ratings: Scout: Rivals: ESPN: (90)				
Overall recruit ranking: Scout: 41 (SG) Rivals: N/A ESPN: 53 (SG)
Note: In many cases, Scout, Rivals, 247Sports, On3, and ESPN may conflict in their listings of height and weight.; In these cases, the average was taken. ESPN grades are on a 100-point scale.; Sources: "2010 Team Ranking". Rivals.

== College career ==
Brust began his collegiate career playing under Bo Ryan's Wisconsin Badgers in 2010. During the 2010–11 and 2011–12 seasons, Brust came off the bench. In his sophomore year in 2011–12, he averaged the 6th most minutes and the 5th most points per game on the team. He also averaged 1.6 three-pointers game per game, which ranked 13th in the Big Ten.

During the 2012–13 and 2013–14 seasons, Brust started all of the Badgers' games. In his junior year in 2012–13, he led the team in minutes and assist-to-turnover ratio with a 2.0, and led the team in scoring for the Big Ten conference games. In his senior year in 2013–14, he averaged 13 points per game, 4.5 rebounds, 1.3 assists, and 89 total three-pointers through the team's first 35 games. He also has the second-most three-pointers in a career at Wisconsin.

=== College statistics ===
Year	Team	GP	GS	MPG	FG%	3P%	FT%	RPG	APG	SPG	BPG	PPG
2010–11	Wisconsin	15	0	3.0	.250	.200	.000	.5	.1	.1	.0	.7
2011–12	Wisconsin	36	0	21.4	.397	.389	.833	2.2	.7	.7	.0	7.3
2012–13	Wisconsin	35	35	34.3	.423	.387	.674	5.1	2.3	1.0	.1	11.1
2013–14	Wisconsin	38	38	34.7	.419	.393	.899	4.5	1.3	.8	.1	12.8
Career		124	73	26.9	.412	.387	.827	3.5	1.3	.7	.0	9.3

== Professional career ==
After going undrafted in the 2014 NBA draft, Brust joined the Milwaukee Bucks for the 2014 NBA Summer League. On October 11, 2014, he signed a one-year deal with Pieno žvaigždės of the Lithuanian Basketball League. The culture shock he experienced during his lone season in Lithuania left him more homesick than he expected. Only the premier teams in Europe can afford the charter flights and high-end hotels – Brust's team bused or ferried to games in Latvia, Estonia and Finland and saved money by staying in bargain hotels. Brust and American teammates Michael Dixon Jr. and Alex Oriakhi struggled with the food, short days with limited sunlight, and "would literally count down the days until we got back to America". In 39 Lithuanian League games, Brust averaged 6.0 points and 2.5 rebounds per game. He also averaged 8.1 points, 3.0 rebounds, 1.2 assists and 1.2 steals in 14 Baltic League games.

Brust became a sportscaster for the Big Ten Network in 2018. Brust has a daily radio show on ESPN Beaver Dam, ESPN Madison, ESPN Milwaukee, Kyle, Brust & Nortman, alongside co-hosts Kyle Wallace and former NFL punter Brad Nortman. He previously co-hosted Scalzo and Brust with Greg Scalzo. In October 2021, Brust was named the color commentator on the Milwaukee Bucks Radio Network.
