= Traevon Jackson =

American basketball player (born 1992)

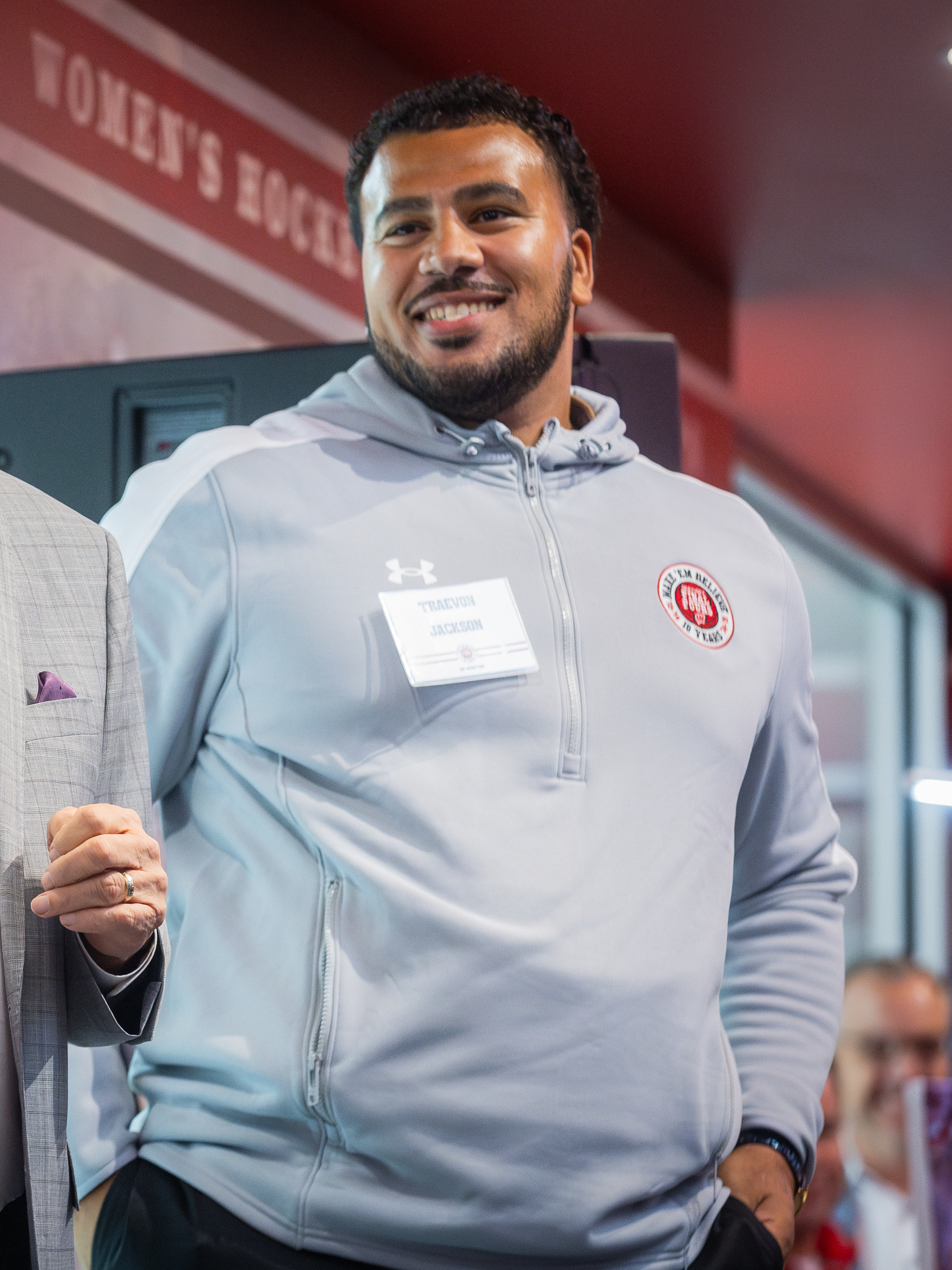
- Jackson in 2024

Personal information
- Born: December 11, 1992 (age 33) Westerville, Ohio, U.S.
- Listed height: 6 ft 3 in (1.91 m)
- Listed weight: 208 lb (94 kg)

Career information
- High school: Westerville South (Westerville, Ohio)
- College: Wisconsin (2011–2015)
- NBA draft: 2015: undrafted
- Playing career: 2015–2020
- Position: Point guard

Career history
- 2016: Iowa Energy
- 2018: Rochester Razorsharks
- 2018–2019: PP & TV Raj Žilina
- 2019–2020: Norrköping Dolphins

Career highlights
- NCAA Tournament All-Region Team (2014); Honorable mention All-Big Ten – Media (2014)

Traevon Jackson (born December 11, 1992) is an American former professional basketball player who last played for the Norrköping Dolphins of the Swedish Basketball League. He played college basketball for the Wisconsin Badgers. Jackson's father, Jim, played in the National Basketball Association for 14 seasons.

== High school career ==
Jackson attended Westerville South High School where he finished as the school's all-time leading scorer. As a junior, he averaged 19 points, 8 rebounds, 6 assists and 4 steals while leading his team to a 20–0 regular-season record. For his efforts, he was named the Ohio Capital Conference Player of the Year as well as second-team all-state. In his senior season, he averaged 18.3 points, 7.0 rebounds, 4.4 assists and 3.3 steals per game while being named conference player of the year.

College recruiting
Name	Hometown	School	Height	Weight	Commit date
Traevon Jackson; SG	Westerville, OH	Westerville South HS	6 ft 2 in (1.88 m)	190 lb (86 kg)	Jun 13, 2010
Traevon Jackson; SG	Recruit ratings: Rivals: 247Sports: ESPN:				
Overall recruit ranking: Rivals: N/A ESPN: 68 (SG)
Note: In many cases, Scout, Rivals, 247Sports, On3, and ESPN may conflict in their listings of height and weight.; In these cases, the average was taken. ESPN grades are on a 100-point scale.; Sources: "2011 Team Ranking". Rivals.

== College career ==
Jackson played college basketball for Wisconsin, averaging 7.7 points, 2.6 rebounds and 2.8 assists in 109 games (84 starts). Jackson would take the starting job at point guard as a sophomore, leading the Badgers to a five seed in the NCAA tournament. In his junior season, Jackson averaged 10.7 points, 4.0 assists, and 3.8 rebounds per game on a Wisconsin team that would capture a two seed and make an appearance at the final four, where Wisconsin would lose to 8th seeded Kentucky 74–73 after Aaron Harrison drained a 3 to seal the game. Jackson then attempted a last second jump shot, which would have won the game if it went in, rolled off the rim. As a senior, Jackson was the starting point guard for the Badgers until a foot injury against Rutgers sidelined him in January. He later returned during the NCAA tournament in a reserve role and ended up with averages of 8.1 points and 2.6 assists per game.

== Professional career ==
=== Iowa Energy ===
After going undrafted in the 2015 NBA draft, Jackson joined the Washington Wizards for the 2015 NBA Summer League. In six games for the Wizards, he averaged 4.3 points, 2.0 rebounds and 2.2 assists in 16.0 minutes per game. On January 26, 2016, he was acquired by the Iowa Energy of the NBA Development League. Two days later, he made his professional debut in a 90–87 loss to the Grand Rapids Drive. In October 2017, he returned to Iowa, who had been renamed to the Wolves and the league now known as the NBA G League. On October 28, the Iowa Energy placed Jackson's contract on waivers when Jackson informed the team he was not returning that season.

=== PP & TV Raj Žilina ===
Jackson played the 2018–19 season for PP & TV Raj Žilina of the Slovak Basketball League. Jackson averaged 11.0 points per game, 3.0 assists per game and 3.8 rebounds per game.

=== Norrköping Dolphins ===
In 2019, Jackson signed with the Wisconsin Herd of the NBA G League for training camp. Jackson was waived a few days before the season started.

Jackson then signed with the Norrköping Dolphins of the Swedish Basketball League. Jackson averaged 12.3 points per game, 3.1 assists per game and 5.3 rebounds per game during the 2019–20 season.

== Personal life ==
The son of Jim Jackson and majored in life science communications. His father played college basketball at Ohio State where he was a two-time All-American and two-time Big Ten Player of the Year, before getting his jersey retired in 2001. He was also the fourth overall pick in the 1992 NBA draft and played in the NBA for 14 seasons with 12 different teams.
